= 2011–12 Sepahan F.C. season =

Sepahan F.C.
2011–12 season
- Chairman: Alireza Rahimi
- Manager: (Croatia) Zlatko Kranjčar
- Stadium: Foolad Shahr Stadium, Isfahan
- IPL: 1st
- Hazfi Cup: Round of 32
- AFC Champions league: Quarter-finals
- Top goalscorer: League: Emad (9); All: Correa (12)
- Highest home attendance: 31,439 v Zob Ahan (9 December 2011), 31,439 v Mes Sarcheshmeh (11 May 2012)
- Lowest home attendance: 1,309 v Fajr Sepasi (29 January 2012)
- Average home league attendance: 10,457
Home colours	Away colours	Third colours

The 2011–12 season are the Sepahan Football Club's 11th season in the Iran Pro League, and their 19th consecutive season in the top division of Iranian football which they won their 4th title in this season. They also competed in the Hazfi Cup but were eliminated by Foolad in Round of 32 and are also competing in AFC Champions League, and 59th year in existence as a football club.

== Player ==
=== First-team squad ===
As of 23 July 2011.

Out for Injuries	Released – Retired

No.	Name	Nationality	Position(s)	Since	Date of birth (age)	Signed from	Appearance(s)	Goal(s)
Goalkeepers
1	Rahman Ahmadi	(Iran)	GK	2011	July 30, 1980 (age 46)	Persepolis	31	0
22	Reza Mohamadi	(Iran)	GK	2011	June 14, 1985 (age 41)	Iranjavan	2	0
27	Hadi Rishesfahani	(Iran)	GK	2009	February 19, 1992 (age 34)	(Youth system)	0	0
30	Mohammad Nasseri	(Iran)	GK	2011	May 16, 1993 (age 33)	(Youth system)	0	0
Defenders
2	Hassan Ashjari	(Iran)	CB	2011	August 1, 1979 (age 47)	Steel Azin	23	1
6	Jalal Hosseini	(Iran)	CB	2009	February 3, 1982 (age 44)	Saipa	94	4
8	Mohsen Bengar	(Iran)	CB	2004	July 6, 1979 (age 47)	Shemushack Noshahr	205	12
16	Hashem Beikzadeh	(Iran)	LB, LM	2010	January 22, 1984 (age 42)	Esteghlal	50	1
17	Abolhassan Jafari	(Iran)	DF	2007	July 21, 1990 (age 36)	(Youth system)	27	0
21	Mehdi Nasiri	(Iran)	DF	2010	November 11, 1987 (age 39)	(Youth system)	14	0
33	Hadi Tamini	(Iran)	DF	2011	August 23, 1981 (age 45)	Malavan	17	0
Midfielders
3	Mohammad Hassan Rajabzadeh	(Iran)	MF	2010	May 23, 1984 (age 42)	Aboumoslem	5	0
4	Moharram Navidkia (captain)	(Iran)	CM, AM	2006	November 1, 1982 (age 44)	(Youth system) (Germany) VfL Bochum	213	32
9	Mehdi Jafarpour	(Iran)	MF	2005	August 20, 1984 (age 42)	PAS Hamedan	105	8
10	Hossein Papi	(Iran)	MF	2004	February 27, 1985 (age 41)	(Youth system)	87	1
11	Mehdi Karimian	(Iran)	MF	2009	August 28, 1980 (age 46)	Bargh Shiraz	75	6
15	Omid Ebrahimi	(Iran)	MF	2010	September 16, 1987 (age 39)	Sh. Bandar Abbas	50	5
18	Reza Nasehi	(Iran)	MF	2010	September 16, 1987 (age 39)	Aboumoslem	17	0
20	Ahmad Jamshidian	(Iran)	MF, AM	2008	May 16, 1984 (age 42)	Rah Ahan	94	17
24	Akbar Imani	(Iran)	MF	2010	March 21, 1992 (age 34)	(Youth system)	6	0
25	Iman Kiani	(Iran)	MF	2011	January 1, 1990 (age 36)	(Youth system)	1	0
26	Saeed Lotfi	(Iran)	MF	2011	July 16, 1992 (age 34)	(Youth system)	0	0
32	Hamid Reza Kazemi	(Iran)	MF	2011	May 6, 1992 (age 34)	(Youth system)	1	0
37	Januário	(Brazil)	CM, AM	2010	September 3, 1979 (age 47)	Esteghlal	51	6
Forwards
7	Emad Mohammed Ridha	(Iraq)	ST	2011	July 24, 1982 (age 44)	(Egypt) Zamalek SC	22	9
14	Farzad Hatami	(Iran)	ST	2009	January 3, 1986 (age 40)	Saba Qom	23	3
14	Xhevahir Sukaj	(Albania)	ST	2012	October 5, 1987 (age 39)	(Turkey) Gençlerbirliği	10	2
19	Bruno Correa	(Brazil)	ST	2012	March 22, 1986 (age 40)	(Armenia) FC Banants	14	7
23	Mehdi Seyed-Salehi	(Iran)	ST	2011	July 27, 1981 (age 45)	Esteghlal	30	8
29	Milorad Janjuš	(Serbia)	ST	2010	July 12, 1982 (age 44)	(Serbia) Spartak Zlatibor Voda	36	11
31	Sardar Azmoun	(Iran)	ST	2011	January 1, 1995 (age 31)	(Youth system)	0	0

=== Iran Pro League squad ===
Note: Flags indicate national team as defined under FIFA eligibility rules; some limited exceptions apply. Players may hold more than one non-FIFA nationality.

No.	Pos.	Nation	Player
1	GK	IRI	Rahman Ahmadi
2	DF	IRI	Hassan Ashjari
4	MF	IRI	Moharram Navidkia (captain)
6	DF	IRI	Jalal Hosseini
7	FW	IRQ	Emad Mohammed Ridha
8	DF	IRI	Mohsen Bengar (1st vice-captain)
9	MF	IRI	Mehdi Jafarpour
10	MF	IRI	Hossein Papi
11	MF	IRI	Mehdi Karimian
14	FW	ALB	Xhevahir Sukaj
15	MF	IRI	Omid Ebrahimi
16	DF	IRI	Hashem Beikzadeh
17	DF	IRI	Abolhassan Jafari
18	MF	IRI	Reza Nasehi

No.	Pos.	Nation	Player
19	FW	BRA	Bruno Correa
20	MF	IRI	Ahmad Jamshidian (2nd vice-captain)
21	DF	IRI	Mehdi Nasiri
22	GK	IRI	Reza Mohamadi
23	FW	IRI	Mehdi Seyed Salehi (3rd vice-captain)
24	MF	IRI	Akbar Imani
25	MF	IRI	Iman Kiani
26	DF	IRI	Saeed Lotfi
27	GK	IRI	Hadi Rishesfahani
30	GK	IRI	Mohammad Nasseri
31	MF	IRI	Sardar Azmoun
32	MF	IRI	Hamid Reza Kazemi
33	DF	IRI	Hadi Tamini
37	MF	BRA	Fábio Januário

==== On loan ====
Note: Flags indicate national team as defined under FIFA eligibility rules; some limited exceptions apply. Players may hold more than one non-FIFA nationality.

No. / Pos. / Nation / Player; 28 / MF / IRI / Ehsan Hajsafi (at Tractor Sazi)	No. / Pos. / Nation / Player; 99 / MF / IRI / Javad Maheri (at Foolad Natanz)

For recent transfers, see List of Iranian football transfers winter 2011–12.

== Transfers ==
Confirmed transfers 2011–12

- Updated on 31 August 2012

=== Summer 2011 ===
In: Note: Flags indicate national team as defined under FIFA eligibility rules; some limited exceptions apply. Players may hold more than one non-FIFA nationality.

No.	Pos.	Nation	Player
7	FW	IRQ	Emad Mohammed (from Shahin)
33	DF	IRI	Hadi Tamini (from Malavan)
23	FW	IRI	Mehdi Seyed-Salehi (from Esteghlal)
17	DF	IRI	Abolhassan Jafari (from Malavan)
14	FW	IRI	Farzad Hatami (from Saba Qom, Loan Return)
2	DF	IRI	Hassan Ashjari (from Steel Azin)
1	GK	IRI	Rahman Ahmadi (from Persepolis)
22	GK	IRI	Reza Mohamadi (from Iranjavan)

Out: Note: Flags indicate national team as defined under FIFA eligibility rules; some limited exceptions apply. Players may hold more than one non-FIFA nationality.

No.	Pos.	Nation	Player
21	FW	IRI	Reza Enayati (to Saba Qom)
10	FW	SEN	Ibrahima Touré (to (United Arab Emirates) Ajman Club)
28	MF	IRI	Ehsan Hajysafi (to Tractor Sazi)
5	DF	IRI	Hadi Aghili (to (Qatar) Al-Arabi)
1	GK	IRI	Mehdi Rahmati (to Esteghlal)
12	GK	IRI	Mohammad Savari (Released)
2	MF	IRI	Khosro Heydari (to Esteghlal)
23	FW	IRI	Javad Kazemian (to Persepolis)

=== Winter 2011–12 ===
In: Note: Flags indicate national team as defined under FIFA eligibility rules; some limited exceptions apply. Players may hold more than one non-FIFA nationality.

No.	Pos.	Nation	Player
19	FW	BRA	Bruno Correa (from (Armenia) Banants)
14	FW	ALB	Xhevahir Sukaj (from (Turkey) Gençlerbirliği)

Out: Note: Flags indicate national team as defined under FIFA eligibility rules; some limited exceptions apply. Players may hold more than one non-FIFA nationality.

No.	Pos.	Nation	Player
14	FW	IRI	Farzad Hatami (to Tractor Sazi)
3	MF	IRI	Mohammad Hassan Rajabzadeh (to Malavan)
29	FW	SRB	Milorad Janjuš (to Shahrdari Tabriz)

== Competitions ==
Competition	Started round	Current position / round	Final position / round	First match	Last match
2011–12 Persian Gulf Cup	—	—	Winner	3 August 2011	11 May 2012
2011 AFC Champions League	Quarter-finals	—	Quarter-finals	14 September 2011	28 September 2011
AFC Champions League	Group stage	—		7 March 2012	
2011–12 Hazfi Cup	Round of 32	—	Round of 32	25 October 2011	25 October 2011

Updated to match played 31 August 2012
Source: Competitions

=== Iran Pro League ===
==== Standings ====
Pos	Team	Pld	W	D	L	GF	GA	GD	Pts	Qualification or relegation
1	Sepahan (C)	34	19	10	5	54	27	+27	67	Qualification for the 2013 AFC Champions League group stage
2	Tractor Sazi	34	19	9	6	57	32	+25	66	Qualification for the 2013 AFC Champions League group stage
3	Esteghlal	34	19	9	6	58	34	+24	66	Qualification for the 2013 AFC Champions League group stage
4	Saba Qom	34	12	14	8	40	38	+2	50	Qualification for the 2013 AFC Champions League qualifying play-off
5	Naft Tehran	34	13	10	11	36	38	−2	49	

Updated to match(es) played on 11 May 2012. Source: varzesh3.com
Rules for classification: 1) points; 2) goal difference; 3) number of goals scored.
(C) Champions

==== Results summary ====
Overall								Home						Away					
Pld	W	D	L	GF	GA	GD	Pts	W	D	L	GF	GA	GD	W	D	L	GF	GA	GD
34	19	10	5	54	27	+27	67	11	4	2	29	13	+16	8	6	3	25	14	+11

Last updated: 31 August 2012.
Source: Ipl Stats

==== Results by round ====
Round	1	2	3	4	5	6	7	8	9	10	11	12	13	14	15	16	17	18	19	20	21	22	23	24	25	26	27	28	29	30	31	32	33	34
Ground	H	A	H	A	H	A	H	A	A	H	A	H	A	H	A	H	A	A	H	A	H	A	H	A	H	H	A	H	A	H	A	H	H	H
Result	D	D	W	W	L	L	W	W	L	W	D	W	D	W	D	D	W	D	L	W	W	W	W	W	W	W	L	W	W	D	W	W	D	D
Position	9	11	7	4	5	7	5	5	5	5	5	5	5	4	5	5	2	3	5	5	3	3	2	1	1	1	1	1	1	1	1	1	1	1

Updated to match(es) played on 31 August 2012. Source: "Ipl".
A = Away; H = Home; W = Win; D = Draw; L = Loss

==== Matches ====
Win Draw Loss

August 3, 2011 1	Sepahan	1–1	Esteghlal	Fooladshahr
22:30 UTC+04:30	Januário 63'; Jamshidian (yellow card)	: Report	Borhani 84'; Borhani (yellow card); Sharifat (red card)	Stadium: Fooladshahr Stadium; Attendance: 20,000; Referee: Mohsen Torki

August 8, 2011 2	Saba Qom	0–0	Sepahan	Qom
22:00 UTC+04:30	Sadeghi (yellow card); Badrlou (yellow card)	: Report	Ahmadi (yellow card); Januário (yellow card)	Stadium: Yadegar-e Emam Stadium; Attendance: 40,000; Referee: Mehdi Seyed Ali

August 12, 2011 3	Sepahan	2–1	Sanat Naft	Fooladshahr
22:00 UTC+04:30	Mohammed 37'; Januário 45'	Report	Sy 55'; Aleksanyan (yellow card)	Stadium: Foolad Shahr Stadium; Attendance: 27,480; Referee: Yadollah Jahan Bazi

August 17, 2011 4	Sh. Tabriz	0–2	Sepahan	Tabriz
22:00 UTC+04:30	Goudarzi (yellow card)	Report	Ebrahimi 56', 65'; Hosseini (yellow card); Bengar (yellow card); Rajabzadeh (yellow card)	Stadium: Yadegar Emam Stadium; Attendance: 18,310; Referee: Gholamreza Jabari

August 17, 2011 5	Sepahan	0–1	Naft Tehran	Fooladshahr
22:00 UTC+04:30	Bengar (yellow card); Rajabzadeh (yellow card)	Report	Mousavi 65'; Kouroshi (yellow card); Ahmadi (yellow card); Magholi (yellow card); Hakhamanesh (yellow card)	Stadium: Foolad Shahr Stadium; Attendance: 40,230; Referee: Mohsen Torki

September 8, 2011 6	Fajr Sepasi	3–2	Sepahan	Shiraz
20:00 UTC+04:30	Rajabzadeh 45'; Nazari 81'; Karimian 91'; Nazari (yellow card)	Report	Ebrahimi 19'; Jamshidian 53'; Seyed Salehi (yellow card); Bengar (yellow card); Ashjari (yellow card); Beikzadeh (yellow card)	Stadium: Hafezieh Stadium; Attendance: 10,561; Referee: Shahin Haj Babaee

September 18, 2011 7	Sepahan	3–0	Damash Gilan	Isfahan
18:30 UTC+04:30	Rahimi (yellow card)	Report	Emad 56'; Emad 69'; Jamshidian 87'; Ebrahimi (yellow card); Ashjari (yellow card)	Stadium: Fooladshahr Stadium; Attendance: 1,000; Referee: Mohsen Ghahremani

October 2, 2011 8	Saipa	0–4	Sepahan	Karaj
19:00 UTC+04:30		Report	Emad 27'; Ashjari 49'; Karimian 58'; Janjus 86'; Hosseini (yellow card)	Stadium: Enghelab Stadium; Attendance: 4,000; Referee: Bakhshi Zadeh

October 9, 2011 9	Mes Kerman	3–0	Sepahan	Kerman
20:00 UTC+04:30		Report		Stadium: Shahid Bahonar Stadium; Attendance: 2,000; Referee: Mohsen Torki

October 14, 2011 10	Sepahan	2–1	Tractor Sazi	Isfahan
16:00 UTC+04:30	Emad 6'; Alenemeh (o.g.) 15'	Report	Paixão 90'	Stadium: Fooladshahr Stadium; Attendance: 5,000; Referee: Hedayatollah Mombeini

October 22, 2011 11	Rah Ahan	1–1	Sepahan	Rey
20:00 UTC+04:30	Hashemi 17'; Tahmoorsi (yellow card)	Report	Januario 15'; Jamshidian (yellow card); Jafarpour (yellow card); Beikzadeh (yellow card); Hosseini (yellow card)	Stadium: Rah Ahan Stadium; Attendance: 2,000; Referee: Mohsen Ghahremani

October 30, 2011 12	Sepahan	3–2	Malavan	Fooladshahr
16:00 UTC+04:30	Seyed Salehi 19'; Mehdi Karimian 77'; Emad 91'		Jarahkar 8'; Heidari 15'	Stadium: Fooladshahr Stadium; Attendance: 1,000; Referee: Saeed Mozafarizadeh

November 19, 2011 13	Persepolis	0–0	Sepahan	Tehrān
12:50 UTC+04:30	Rezaei (yellow card); Zare (yellow card); Noroozi (red card) 78'		Bengar (yellow card); Ebrahimi (yellow card)	Stadium: Azadi Stadium; Attendance: 5,000; Referee: Alireza Faghani

November 23, 2011 14	Sepahan	2–0	Foolad Khuzestan	Fooladshahr
16:15 UTC+04:30	Jafari (yellow card); Emad Mohammed 68'; Janjuš 79'			Stadium: Fooladshahr Stadium; Attendance: 1,500; Referee: Yadollah Jahanbazi

December 3, 2011 15	Shahin Bushehr	1–1	Sepahan	Bushehr
16:15 UTC+04:30	Bayat (yellow card); Azizmohammadi 66'		Jamshidian (yellow card); Janjuš 40'	Stadium: Shahid Beheshti Stadium; Attendance: 5,000; Referee: Mohsen Torki

December 9, 2011 16	Sepahan	1–1	Zob Ahan	Fooladshahr
16:00 UTC+04:30	Januário 53'	Summary	Ghazi Najafabadi 39'	Stadium: Fooladshahr Stadium; Attendance: 3,000; Referee: Alreza Faghani

December 16, 2011 17	Mes Sarcheshmeh	0–2	Sepahan	Kerman
16:00 UTC+04:30		Summary	Salehi 35'; Ebrahimi 86' (pen.)	Stadium: Shahid Bahonar Stadium; Attendance: 400; Referee: Saeid Bakhshizadeh

January 6, 2012 18	Esteghlal	1–1	Sepahan	Teheran
18:30	Shirzadeh 32'	Summary	Salehi 53'	Stadium: Azadi Stadium; Attendance: 30,000; Referee: Saeid Mozaffarizadeh

January 11, 2012 19	Sepahan	1–2	Saba Qom	Fooladshahr
18:00 UTC+04:30		: Report		Stadium: Fooladshahr Stadium

January 15, 2012 20	Sanat Naft	0–4	Sepahan	Abadan
18:00 UTC+04:30		: Report		Stadium: Takhti Stadium

January 20, 2012 21	Sepahan	1–0	Shahrdari Tabriz	Fooladshahr
18:30 UTC+04:30		: Report		Stadium: Fooladshahr Stadium

January 25, 2012 22	Naft Tehran	0–1	Sepahan	Tehran
16:00 UTC+04:30		: Report		Stadium: Shahid Dastgerdi Stadium

January 29, 2012 23	Sepahan	1–0	Fajr Sepasi	Fooladshahr
18:00 UTC+04:30		: Report		Stadium: Fooladshahr Stadium

February 3, 2012 24	Damash Gilan	0–1	Sepahan	Rasht
17:00 UTC+04:30		: Report		Stadium: Dr. Azoodi Stadium

February 8, 2012 25	Sepahan	4–0	Mes Kerman	Fooladshahr
19:00 UTC+04:30		: Report		Stadium: Fooladshahr Stadium

February 2012 26	Sepahan	2–1	Saipa	Fooladshahr
18:00 UTC+04:30		: Report		Stadium: Fooladshahr Stadium

January 29, 2012 27	Tractor Sazi	1–0	Sepahan	Tabriz
18:00 UTC+04:30		: Report		Stadium: Yadegar-e Emam Stadium

March 17, 2012 28	Sepahan	3–2	Rah Ahan	Fooladshahr
16:00 UTC+03:30	Bruno César Correa 54', 69', 88'; Seyed Salehi (yellow card); Bengar (red card)	report	Kazemi 56'; Razaghirad 90+4'; Abdi (yellow card); Mojtaba Shiri (yellow card)	Stadium: Fooladshahr Stadium; Attendance: 5,000; Referee: Mohsen Torki

April 7, 2012 29	Malavan	3–4	Sepahan	Bandar Anzali
17:00 UTC+04:30		: Report		Stadium: Takhti Stadium

April 12, 2012 30	Sepahan	1–1	Persepolis	Fooladshahr
19:00 UTC+04:30		: Report		Stadium: Fooladshahr Stadium

April 22, 2012 31	Foolad	1–2	Sepahan	Ahvaz
17:00 UTC+04:30		: Report		Stadium: Takhti Stadium

April 26, 2012 32	Sepahan	2–0	Shahin Bushehr	Fooladshahr
14:00 UTC+04:30		: Report		Stadium: Fooladshahr Stadium

May 6, 2012 33	Zob Ahan	0–0	Sepahan	Fooladshahr
20:30 UTC+04:30		: Report		Stadium: Fooladshahr Stadium

May 11, 2012 34	Sepahan	0–0	Mes Sarcheshmeh	Fooladshahr
20:00 UTC+04:30		: Report		Stadium: Fooladshahr Stadium

=== AFC Champions League ===
==== AFC Champions League 2011 ====
===== Quarter-finals =====
September 14, 2011 1st Leg	Sepahan	1 – 0; 0 – 3 (Awarded)	(Qatar) Al-Sadd	Fooladshahr
19:30 UTC+03:30	Ebrahimi 12'; Imani (yellow card) (yellow-red card)	Report	Koni (yellow card); Belhadj (yellow card); Ibrahim (yellow card)	Stadium: Fooladshahr Stadium; Attendance: 15,578; Referee: Benjamin Wiliams

September 28, 2011 2nd Leg	Al-Sadd (Qatar)	1–2	Sepahan	Doha
18:20 UTC+03:00	Mamadou Niang 85'	Report	Emad 6'; Ashjari 25'	Stadium: Jassim Bin Hamad Stadium; Attendance: 6,026; Referee: Abdul Rahman Abdulkhalegh

==== AFC Champions League 2012 ====
===== Group stage =====
Pos	Team	Pld	W	D	L	GF	GA	GD	Pts	Qualification	SEP	AHL	NAS	LEK
1	(Iran) Sepahan	6	4	1	1	9	4	+5	13	Advance to knockout stage	—	2–1	1–0	2–1
2	(Saudi Arabia) Al-Ahli	6	3	1	2	10	6	+4	10	Advance to knockout stage	1–1	—	3–1	3–0
3	(United Arab Emirates) Al-Nasr	6	2	0	4	6	11	−5	6 (Note: Al-Nasr and Lekhwiya are ranked by their head-to-head record (Al-Nasr: 6 pts; Lekhwiya: 0 pts).)		0–3	1–2	—	2–1
4	(Qatar) Lekhwiya	6	2	0	4	5	9	−4	6		1–0	1–0	1–2	—

Source: WorldFootball.net
Notes:

Win Draw Loss

March 7, 2012 G1	Sepahan	1–0	(United Arab Emirates) Al-Nasr	Foolad Shahr Stadium, Isfahan
18:30 UTC+04:30	Correa 84'	Report		Attendance: 6,550; Referee: Tan Hai (China PR)

March 21, 2012 G2	Al-Ahli (Saudi Arabia)	1–1	Sepahan	Prince Abdullah al-Faisal Stadium, Jeddah
20:30 UTC+03:00	Simões (penalty scored)	Report	Correa 35'	Attendance: 14,247; Referee: Valentin Kovalenko (Uzbekistan)

April 3, 2012 G3	Sepahan	2–1	(Qatar) Lekhwiya	Prince Abdullah al-Faisal Stadium, Jeddah
20:00 UTC+04:30	Hosseini 10'; Correa 89'	Report	Afif 55'	Attendance: 6,723; Referee: Ryuji Sato (Japan)

April 18, 2012 G4	Lekhwiya (Qatar)	1–0	Sepahan	Al-Maktoum Stadium, Dubai
19:00 UTC+03:00	Koné 90+1'	Report		Attendance: 3,423; Referee: Malik Abdul Bashir (Singapore)

May 1, 2012 G5	Al-Nasr SC (United Arab Emirates)	0–3	Sepahan	Al-Maktoum Stadium, Dubai
20:00 UTC+04:00		Report	Correa 44'; Sukaj 69'; Salehi 77'; Ebrahimi (penalty missed)	Attendance: 2,264; Referee: Nawaf Shukralla (Bahrain)

May 15, 2012 G6	Sepahan	2–1	(Saudi Arabia) Al-Ahli	Fooladshahr Stadium, Isfahan
20:30 UTC+04:30

==== Knockout stage ====
May 22, 2012 Round of 16	Sepahan	2–0	Esteghlal	Isfahan
20:30 UTC+04:30	Correa 8'; Bengar 34'	Report		Stadium: Foolad Shahr Stadium; Attendance: 12,351; Referee: Kim Dong-Jin

=== Hazfi Cup ===
==== Matches ====
Win Draw Loss

===== Round of 32 =====
October 25, 2011 Second round	Foolad	1–0	Sepahan	Ahvaz
18:00 UTC+04:30	Afshin 61'; Rafee (yellow card)	Report		Stadium: Takhti Stadium; Attendance: 3,000; Referee: Alireza Faghani

=== Friendly Matches ===
Win Draw Loss

July 12, 2011 1	Sepahan	9–0	Sepahan Novin	Fooladshahr
17:00 UTC+03:00		Report		Stadium: Fooladshahr Stadium; Attendance: 7,000

September 1, 2011 2	Sepahan	6–1	Sepahan Novin	Fooladshahr
19:00 UTC+03:00		Report		Stadium: Fooladshahr Stadium; Attendance: 9,000

January 15, 2012 3	Sepahan	2–0	(Turkey) Kayserispor	Fooladshahr
22:00 UTC+03:00				Stadium: Fooladshahr Stadium

== Statistics ==
=== Appearances ===
No.	Pos	Nat	Player	Total		Iran Pro League		Hazfi Cup		2011 ACL		2012 ACL	
No.	Pos	Nat	Player	Apps	Goals	Apps	Goals	Apps	Goals	Apps	Goals	Apps	Goals
1	GK	(Iran) IRI	Rahman Ahmadi	41	0	32+0	0	1+0	0	1+0	0	7+0	0
2	DF	(Iran) IRI	Hassan Ashjari	29	2	13+10	1	1+0	0	1+0	1	4+0	0
3	MF	(Iran) IRI	Mohammad Hassan Rajabzadeh	2	0	1+1	0	0+0	0	0+0	0	0+0	0
4	MF	(Iran) IRI	Moharram Navidkia	39	2	13+16	2	0+1	0	0+2	0	5+2	0
6	DF	(Iran) IRI	Jalal Hosseini	40	2	27+3	1	1+0	0	2+0	0	7+0	1
7	FW	(Iraq) IRQ	Emad Mohammed Ridha	28	10	9+15	9	1+0	0	1+1	1	0+1	0
8	DF	(Iran) IRI	Mohsen Bengar	38	3	28+0	1	1+0	0	2+0	0	7+0	2
9	MF	(Iran) IRI	Mehdi Jafarpour	27	1	2+19	1	1+0	0	0+0	0	1+4	0
10	MF	(Iran) IRI	Hossein Papi	12	0	0+9	0	0+1	0	0+0	0	0+2	0
11	MF	(Iran) IRI	Mehdi Karimian	37	4	13+14	4	1+0	0	0+2	0	3+4	0
14	FW	(Iran) IRI	Farzad Hatami	2	0	0+1	0	0+1	0	0+0	0	0+0	0
14	FW	(Albania) ALB	Xhevahir Sukaj	16	4	2+8	2	0+0	0	0+0	0	1+5	2
15	MF	(Iran) IRI	Omid Ebrahimi	42	7	32+0	6	1+0	0	2+0	1	7+0	0
16	DF	(Iran) IRI	Hashem Beikzadeh	32	0	19+7	0	0+1	0	1+1	0	3+0	0
17	DF	(Iran) IRI	Abolhassan Jafari	32	0	21+4	0	0+0	0	1+0	0	5+1	0
18	MF	(Iran) IRI	Reza Nasehi	14	0	0+13	0	0+1	0	0+0	0	0+0	0
19	FW	(Brazil) BRA	Bruno Correa	21	12	10+4	7	0+0	0	0+0	0	3+4	5
20	MF	(Iran) IRI	Ahmad Jamshidian	28	2	8+14	2	0+0	0	0+1	0	0+5	0
21	DF	(Iran) IRI	Mehdi Nasiri	8	0	6+0	0	0+0	0	2+0	0	0+0	0
22	GK	(Iran) IRI	Reza Mohamadi	3	0	2+0	0	0+0	0	1+0	0	0+0	0
23	FW	(Iran) IRI	Mehdi Seyed Salehi	40	9	15+15	8	0+1	0	2+0	0	1+6	1
24	MF	(Iran) IRI	Akbar Imani	7	0	1+5	0	0+0	0	1+0	0	0+0	0
25	MF	(Iran) IRI	Iman Kiani	1	0	0+1	0	0+0	0	0+0	0	0+0	0
26	DF	(Iran) IRI	Saeed Lotfi	0	0	0+0	0	0+0	0	0+0	0	0+0	0
27	GK	(Iran) IRI	Hadi Rishesfahani	0	0	0+0	0	0+0	0	0+0	0	0+0	0
29	FW	(Serbia) SRB	Milorad Janjuš	15	3	1+12	3	0+0	0	0+2	0	0+0	0
30	GK	(Iran) IRI	Mohammad Nasseri	0	0	0+0	0	0+0	0	0+0	0	0+0	0
31	MF	(Iran) IRI	Sardar Azmoun	0	0	0+0	0	0+0	0	0+0	0	0+0	0
32	MF	(Iran) IRI	Hamid Reza Kazemi	1	0	0+1	0	0+0	0	0+0	0	0+0	0
33	DF	(Iran) IRI	Hadi Tamini	20	0	12+5	0	0+0	0	0+0	0	0+3	0
37	MF	(Brazil) BRA	Fábio Januário	37	5	8+21	5	0+0	0	0+1	0	2+5	0

Apps: x+y, where x means full match (90-minute) appearance and y means appearance as an exchange (In or Out) player.

=== Goal scorers ===
Includes all competitive matches. The list is sorted by shirt number when total goals are equal.

Last updated on 31 August 2012

No.	Pos.	Nat.	Name	Iran Pro League	Hazfi Cup	2011 ACL	2012 ACL	Total
19	FW	(Brazil)	Bruno César	7	0	0	5	12
7	FW	(Iraq)	Emad Mohammed Ridha	9	0	1	0	10
23	FW	(Iran)	Mehdi Seyed Salehi	8	0	0	1	9
15	MF	(Iran)	Omid Ebrahimi	6	0	1	0	7
37	MF	(Brazil)	Januário	5	0	0	0	5
11	MF	(Iran)	Mehdi Karimian	4	0	0	0	4
14	FW	(Albania)	Xhevahir Sukaj	2	0	0	2	4
8	DF	(Iran)	Mohsen Bengar	1	0	0	2	3
29	FW	(Serbia)	Milorad Janjuš	3	0	0	0	3
2	DF	(Iran)	Hassan Ashjari	1	0	1	0	2
4	MF	(Iran)	Moharram Navidkia	2	0	0	0	2
6	DF	(Iran)	Jalal Hosseini	1	0	0	1	2
20	MF	(Iran)	Ahmad Jamshidian	2	0	0	0	2
9	MF	(Iran)	Mehdi Jafarpour	1	0	0	0	1
Own goal				2	0	0	0	2
TOTALS				54	0	3	11	68

Friendlies and Pre-season goals are not recognized as competitive match goals.

=== Disciplinary record ===
Includes all competitive matches. Players with 1 card or more included only.

Last updated on 31 August 2012

				Iran Pro League			Hazfi Cup			2011 ACL			2012 ACL			Total		
No.	Pos.	Nat.	Name	Yellow card	(yellow card) (yellow-red card)	Red card	Yellow card	(yellow card) (yellow-red card)	Red card	Yellow card	(yellow card) (yellow-red card)	Red card	Yellow card	(yellow card) (yellow-red card)	Red card	Yellow card	(yellow card) (yellow-red card)	Red card
1	GK	(Iran)	Rahman Ahmadi	2	0	0	0	0	0	0	0	0	1	0	0	3	0	0
2	DF	(Iran)	Hassan Ashjari	6	2	0	0	0	0	1	0	0	0	0	0	7	2	0
3	MF	(Iran)	Mohammad H. Rajabzadeh	2	0	0	0	0	0	0	0	0	0	0	0	2	0	0
4	MF	(Iran)	Moharram Navidkia	0	0	0	0	0	0	0	0	0	1	0	0	1	0	0
6	DF	(Iran)	Jalal Hosseini	5	0	0	0	0	0	0	0	0	0	0	0	5	0	0
8	DF	(Iran)	Mohsen Bengar	7	0	1	0	0	0	0	0	0	0	0	0	7	0	1
9	MF	(Iran)	Mehdi Jafarpour	3	0	0	0	0	0	0	0	0	1	0	0	4	0	0
11	MF	(Iran)	Mehdi Karimian	2	0	0	0	0	0	0	0	0	0	0	0	2	0	0
14	FW	(Albania)	Xhevahir Sukaj	0	0	0	0	0	0	0	0	0	1	0	0	1	0	0
15	MF	(Iran)	Omid Ebrahimi	7	0	0	0	0	0	0	0	0	1	0	0	8	0	0
16	DF	(Iran)	Hashem Beikzadeh	3	0	0	0	0	0	0	0	0	1	0	0	4	0	0
17	DF	(Iran)	Abolhassan Jafari	5	0	0	0	0	0	1	0	0	1	0	0	7	0	0
18	MF	(Iran)	Reza Nasehi	0	0	1	0	0	0	0	0	0	0	0	0	0	0	1
19	FW	(Brazil)	Bruno Correa	2	0	0	0	0	0	0	0	0	0	0	0	2	0	0
20	MF	(Iran)	Ahmad Jamshidian	5	0	0	0	0	0	0	0	0	0	0	0	5	0	0
21	DF	(Iran)	Mehdi Nasiri	0	0	0	0	0	0	1	0	0	0	0	0	1	0	0
23	FW	(Iran)	Mehdi Seyed Salehi	5	0	0	0	0	0	1	0	0	1	0	0	7	0	0
24	MF	(Iran)	Akbar Imani	0	0	0	0	0	0	0	1	0	0	0	0	0	1	0
29	FW	(Serbia)	Milorad Janjuš	1	0	0	0	0	0	1	0	0	0	0	0	2	0	0
37	MF	(Brazil)	Januário	4	0	0	0	0	0	0	0	0	1	0	0	5	0	0
TOTALS				59	2	2	0	0	0	5	1	0	9	0	0	73	3	2

=== Goals conceded ===
- Updated on 31 August 2012

				Iran Pro League		Hazfi Cup		2011 ACL		2012 ACL		Total		
No.	Pos.	Nat.	Name	Apps.	G. cond.	Apps.	G. cond.	Apps.	G. cond.	Apps.	G. cond.	Apps.	G. cond.	Clean Sheets
1	GK	(Iran)	Rahman Ahmadi	32	24	1	1	1	0	7	4	41	29	18
22	GK	(Iran)	Reza Mohamadi	2	3	0	0	1	1	0	0	3	4	1
TOTALS				34	27	1	1	2	1	7	4	44	33	19

=== Own goals ===
- Updated on 31 August 2012

No.	Pos.	Nat.	Name	Iran Pro League	Hazfi Cup	2011 ACL	2012 ACL	Total
2	DF	(Iran)	Hassan Ashjari	1	0	0	0	1
24	MF	(Iran)	Akbar Imani	1	0	0	0	1
TOTALS				2	0	0	0	2

== Club ==
=== Coaching staff ===
Position	Staff
Head coach	(Croatia) Zlatko Kranjčar
Assistant coach	(Iran) Mahmoud Karimi
Assistant coach	(Iran) Alireza Marzban
Goalkeeper coach	(Croatia) Tonči Merdolias
Match analyst	(Iran) Masoud Palizdar
Fitness coach	(Germany) Benjamin Kugel
Football Academy Manager	(Iran) Reza Fatahi
Doctor	(Iran) Mohammad Rashadi
Assistant doctor	(Iran) Asghar Shirkosh
Team manager	(Iran) Rasoul Khorvash

=== Other information ===
Chairman	(Iran) Alireza Rahimi
Ground (capacity and dimensions)	Naghsh-e-Jahan Stadium (75,000 / )

Updated to match played 31 August 2012

== See also ==
- 2011–12 Persian Gulf Cup
- 2011–12 Hazfi Cup
- 2011 AFC Champions League
- 2012 AFC Champions League
