= 2010–11 Sepahan F.C. season =

Sepahan F.C.
2010–11 season
- Chairman: Mohammad Reza Saket
- Manager: Amir Ghalenoei
- Stadium: Foolad Shahr Stadium, Isfahan
- IPL: 1st
- Hazfi Cup: Quarter-final
- AFC Champions league: Quarter-final
- Top goalscorer: League: Touré (18); All: Touré (24)
Home colours	Away colours	Third colours

The 2010–11 season are the Sepahan Football Club's 10th season in the Iran Pro League, and their 18th consecutive season in the top division of Iranian football which they won their 3rd title in this season. They also competed in the Hazfi Cup but were eliminated by Persepolis in the quarter-final and are also competing in AFC Champions League.

== Players ==
=== Iran Pro League squad ===
Note: Flags indicate national team as defined under FIFA eligibility rules; some limited exceptions apply. Players may hold more than one non-FIFA nationality.

No.	Pos.	Nation	Player
1	GK	IRI	Mehdi Rahmati
2	DF	IRI	Khosro Heydari
4	MF	IRI	Moharram Navidkia (captain)
5	DF	IRI	Hadi Aghili
6	DF	IRI	Jalal Hosseini
7	MF	IRI	Hossein Papi
8	DF	IRI	Mohsen Bengar (1st vice-captain)
9	MF	IRI	Mehdi Jafarpour
10	FW	SEN	Ibrahima Touré
11	MF	IRI	Mehdi Karimian
15	MF	IRI	Omid Ebrahimi
16	DF	IRI	Hashem Beikzadeh
17	DF	IRI	Abolhassan Jafari

No.	Pos.	Nation	Player
20	MF	IRI	Ahmad Jamshidian
21	FW	IRI	Reza Enayati
22	GK	IRI	Reza Mohamadi
23	MF	IRI	Javad Kazemian
24	MF	IRI	Akbar Imani
25	MF	IRI	Iman Kiani
26	DF	IRI	Saeed Lotfi
27	GK	IRI	Hadi Rishesfahani
28	MF	IRI	Ehsan Hajsafi
29	FW	SRB	Milorad Janjuš
32	MF	IRI	Hamid Reza Kazemi
37	MF	BRA	Fábio Januário
–	DF	IRI	Mehdi Nasiri

==== On loan ====
Note: Flags indicate national team as defined under FIFA eligibility rules; some limited exceptions apply. Players may hold more than one non-FIFA nationality.

No. / Pos. / Nation / Player	No. / Pos. / Nation / Player

For recent transfers, see List of Iranian football transfers winter 2010–11.

== Competitions ==
=== Iran Pro League ===
==== Standings ====
Pos	Team	Pld	W	D	L	GF	GA	GD	Pts	Qualification or relegation
1	Sepahan (C)	34	18	12	4	56	29	+27	66	Qualification for the 2012 AFC Champions League group stage
2	Esteghlal	34	18	11	5	55	34	+21	65	Qualification for the 2012 AFC Champions League Qualifying play-off
3	Zob Ahan	34	18	9	7	49	31	+18	63	Qualification for the 2012 AFC Champions League Qualifying play-off
4	Persepolis	34	17	7	10	50	36	+14	58	Qualification for 2012 AFC Champions League group stage (Note: Persepolis qualified to AFC Champions League group stage directly by winning the Hazfi Cup)
5	Tractor Sazi	34	15	12	7	42	29	+13	57	

Updated to match(es) played on 1 SEP 2018. Source: IPL Stats, Soccerway
Rules for classification: 1) Points; 2) Goal difference; 3) Goals scored.
(C) Champions

=== AFC Champions League ===
==== Group stage ====
Pos	Team	Pld	W	D	L	GF	GA	GD	Pts	Qualification	SEP	HIL	GHA	JAZ
1	(Iran) Sepahan	6	4	1	1	14	5	+9	13 (Note: Tiebreakers: Sepahan and Al-Hilal are ranked by their head-to-head records: Sepahan (4 pts), Al-Hilal (1 pt).)	Advance to knockout stage	—	1–1	2–0	5–1
2	(Saudi Arabia) Al-Hilal	6	4	1	1	11	6	+5	13	Advance to knockout stage	1–2	—	2–0	3–1
3	(Qatar) Al-Gharafa	6	2	1	3	6	7	−1	7		1–0	0–1	—	5–2
4	(United Arab Emirates) Al-Jazira	6	0	1	5	7	20	−13	1		1–4	2–3	0–0	—

Notes:

1 March 2011	Al-Hilal (Saudi Arabia)	1–2	Sepahan	King Fahd International Stadium, Riyadh
20:30 UTC+03:00	Wilhelmsson 90+3'	Report	Touré 51'; Januário 60'	Attendance: 15,000; Referee: Ravshan Irmatov (Uzbekistan)

15 March 2011	Sepahan	5–1	(United Arab Emirates) Al-Jazira	Foolad Shahr Stadium, Isfahan
19:00 UTC+03:30	Jamshidian 2', 24'; Touré 56'; Janjuš 65'; Kazemian 90'	Report	Baré 54'	Attendance: 2,520; Referee: Malik Abdul Bashir (Singapore)

5 April 2011	Sepahan	2–0	(Qatar) Al-Gharafa	Foolad Shahr Stadium, Isfahan
20:00 UTC+04:30	Aghili 54' (pen.); Jamshidian 66'	Report		Attendance: 5,668; Referee: Yuichi Nishimura (Japan)

20 April 2011	Al-Gharafa (Qatar)	1–0	Sepahan	Al-Gharafa Stadium, Al Rayyan
18:50 UTC+03:00	Diané 19'	Report		Attendance: 3,426; Referee: Muhsen Basma (Syria)

4 May 2011	Sepahan	1–1	(Saudi Arabia) Al-Hilal	Foolad Shahr Stadium, Isfahan
20:00 UTC+04:30	Navidkia 55'	Report	Al-Zori 46'	Attendance: 8,833; Referee: Tan Hai (China PR)

11 May 2011	Al-Jazira (United Arab Emirates)	1–4	Sepahan	Mohammed bin Zayed Stadium, Abu Dhabi
20:00 UTC+04:00	Baré 14'	Report	Kazemian 32'; Touré 60', 71'; Enayati 90+1'	Attendance: 2,265; Referee: Choi Myung-Yong (Korea Republic)

==== Knockout stage ====
24 May 2011 Round of 16	Sepahan	3–1	(Uzbekistan) Bunyodkor	Foolad Shahr Stadium, Isfahan
19:30 UTC+04:30	Januário 28'; Touré 33'; Aghili 69' (pen.)	Report	Slavoljub Đorđević 57'	Attendance: 6,318; Referee: Masaaki Toma (Japan)

14 September 2011 Quarter-final, first leg	Sepahan	0–3; Awarded (Note: The AFC Disciplinary Committee decided to award the quarter-final first leg to Al-Sadd against Sepahan as a 3–0 forfeit win after Sepahan were found guilty of fielding an ineligible player. The match originally ended 1–0 to Sepahan.)	(Qatar) Al-Sadd	Foolad Shahr Stadium, Isfahan
19:30 UTC+04:30	Ebrahimi 12'	Report		Attendance: 5,621; Referee: Ben Williams (Australia)

28 September 2011 Quarter-final, second leg	Al-Sadd (Qatar)	1–2 (4–2 agg.)	Sepahan	Jassim bin Hamad Stadium, Al Rayyan
18:20 UTC+03:00	Niang 86'	Report	Emad 7'; Ashjari 27'	Attendance: 6,026; Referee: Yuichi Nishimura (Japan)

== See also ==
- 2010–11 Persian Gulf Cup
- 2010–11 Hazfi Cup
- 2011 AFC Champions League
