= 2009–10 Sepahan F.C. season =

Sepahan
2009–10 season
- Chairman: Mohammad Reza Saket
- Manager: Amir Ghalenoei
- Iran Pro League: Champions
- AFC Champions League: Group stage
- Hazfi Cup: 1/8 Final
- Top goalscorer: League: Emad Mohammed (19); All: Ibrahima Touré (20)

This is a list of Sepahan F.C.'s results at the Persian Gulf Cup 2009–10, Hazfi Cup 2009-10 and 2010 ACL. The club is competing in the Iran Pro League, Hazfi Cup and Asian Champions League.

== Persian Gulf Cup ==
=== Statistics ===
No.	Position	Player	IPL	Goals	Hazfi Cup	Goals	ACL	Total	Goals
1	GK	(Iran) Mehdi Rahmati	30	0	1	0	6	37	0
2	DF	(Iran) Amir Saadati	-	-	-	-	-	-	
3	DF	(Iran) Hamid Azizadeh	-	-	-	-	-	-	
4	MF	(Iran) Moharram Navidkia	20	0	1	0	3	0	
5	DF	(Iran) Hadi Aghily	23	5	1	0	4	0	
6	DF	(Iran) Jalal Hosseini	32	1	-	-	4	1	
7	FW	(Iraq) Emad Mohammed	28	19	1	0	2	0	-
8	DF	(Iran) Mohsen Bengar	32	1	-	-	4	1	-
9	MF	(Iran) Mehdi Jafarpour	28	2	1	0	4	0	-
10	FW	(Senegal) Ibrahima Touré	24	18	1	1	4	1	
11	MF	(Iran) Mehdi Karimian	32	1	-	-	4	0	
12	MF	(Iran) Shahin Kheiri	12	0	-	-	4	0	
14	MF	(Iran) Ahmad Alenemeh	25	2	1	0	1	0	
15	MF	(Iran) Hossein Papi	26	0	1	1	4	0	
16	MF	(Iran) Bahman Tahmasebi	15	0	-	-	-	-	
17	MF	(Iran) Hadi Jafari	3	0	-	-	-	-	
18	FW	(Iran) Farzad Hatami	21	3	1	1	2	0	
19	MF	(Iran) Javad Maheri	14	1	-	-	-	-	
20	FW	(Iran) Ahmad Jamshidian	32	9	-	-	4	1	
21	DF	(Mozambique) Armando Sá	12	0	1	0	2	0	-
22	GK	(Iran) Rahman Ahmadi	4	0	-	-	-	-	
23	DF	(Iran) Reza Talabeh	-	-	-	-	-	-	
24	DF	(Iran) Mohammad Reza Zare	-	-	-	-	-	-	
25	MF	(Iran) Ebrahim Loveinian	-	-	-	-	-	-	
26	FW	(Iran) Jalaledin Alimohammadi	-	-	-	-	-	-	-
27	MF	(Iran) Hadi Reesh Esfahani	-	-	-	-	-	-	-
28	MF	(Iran) Ehsan Hajysafi	32	5	1	0	4	0	
29	MF	(Iran) Behzad Soltani	-	-	-	-	-	-	-
32	GK	(Iran) Miad Abazari	-	-	-	-	-	-	-
40	MF	(Iran) Ali Molaei	4	0	1	0	2	0	-
42	DF	(Iran) Mohammad Ali Rouzati	-	-	-	-	-	-	
	DF	(Iran) Akbar Imani	1	0	1	0	-	-	-

=== Matches ===
Win	Draw	Lose

Last updated 18 December 2009

#	Date	Home	Score	Away	Venue	Goal	Yellow card	Red card	Fans	Ref	Rank
1	2009-Aug-07	Esteghlal	1-0	Sepahan	Azadi /Tehran	-	-	-	N/F	Hedayat Mombeini	15
2	2009-Aug-15	Sepahan	3-0	Mes Kerman	Foolad Shahr/Esfahan	Ahmad Jamshidian 27', Emad Mohamad Redha 55', Farzad Hatami 65'	Ahmad Alnemae	-	10,000	Masoud Moradi	6
3	2009-Aug-21	Moghavemat	3-1	Sepahan	Hafezieh/Shiraz	Farzad Hatami 35'	Farzad Hatami	-	3,000	Khodadad Afsharian	12
4	2009-Aug-28	Sepahan	4-1	Est. Ahvaz	Foolad Shahr/Esfahan	Farzad Hatami 12', Mehdi Jafarpour 14', Hadi Aghili 56', Ehsan Hajsafi 76'	Ehsan Hajsafi, Hadi Aghili	Hadi Aghili	10,000	Alireza Faghani	8
5	2009-Sep-07	Foolad	0-0	Sepahan	Foolad /Ahvaz	-	Ehsan Hajsafi	-	2و000	Saeed Mozafari Zadeh	7
6	2009-Sep-13	Sepahan	3-1	Pas Hamedan	Foolad Shahr/Esfahan	Ahmad Jamshidian 30', 75', Ebrahim Tore 54'	Hadi Aghili, Mehdi Jafarpour, Ehsan Hajsafi	-	8,000	Ghasem Vahedi	5
7	2009-Sep-20	Malavan	0-0	Sepahan	Takhti/Anzali	-	-	-	14,000	Shahin Hajbabaei	6
8	2009-Sep-28	Sepahan	3-1	Saba QOM	Foolad Shahr/Esfahan	Ehsan Hajsafi 16', Ahmad Jamshidian 29', Emad Mohamad Redha 37'	Seyed Jalal Hossaini, Seyed Mehdi Rahmati, Ebrahim Tore	-	8,000	Rahim Mehrpishe	5
9	2009-Oct-01	Saipa	2-2	Sepahan	Enghelab/Karaj	Mehdi Jafarpour 41', Ebrahim Tore 58'	-	-	5,000	Alireza Faghani	5
10	2009-Oct-06	Zob Ahan	0-0	Sepahan	Foolad Shahr/Esfahan	-	Ebrahim Tore, Shahin Kheyri	-	13,000	Masoud Moradi	4
11	2009-Oct-11	Sepahan	3-1	Tractor Sazi	Foolad Shahr/Esfahan	Ahmad Alnemae 58', Emad Mohamad Redha 65', 73'	Mehdi Jafarpour	-	4,000	Saeed Bakhshi Zadeh	4
12	2009-Oct-16	Shahin Bushehr	1-2	Sepahan	Shahid Beheshti /Bushehr	Emad Mohamad Redha 70', 89'	-	-	25,000	Mohsen Torki	2
13	2009-Oct-22	Sepahan	0-1	Steel Azin	Foolad Shahr/Esfahan	-	Ahmad Alenemeh, Ibrahima Touré, Seyed Mehdi Rahmati	Ibrahima Touré(87)	10,000	Mohsen Ghahremani	3
14	2009-Oct-26	Rah Ahan	0-1	Sepahan	Ekbatan/Tehran	Javad Maheri 12'	-	-	2,000	Yadolah Jahanbazi	1
15	2009-Oct-31	Sepahan	2-0	Aboomoslem	Foolad Shahr/Esfahan	Ahmad Jamshidian 3', Emad Mohamad Redha 62'(P)	Ehsan Hajsafi	-	3,000	Alborz Hajipour	1
16	2009-Nov-06	Paykan	1-4	Sepahan	Shahid Rajaei /Qazvin	Emad Mohamad Redha 7', Ebrahim Tore 11', Ehsan Hajsafi 48', Ahmad Jamshidian 56'	Mehdi Jafarpour	-	4,000	Toraj Haghverdi	1
17	2009-Nov-28	Sepahan	2-1	Persepolis	Foolad Shahr/Esfahan	Ebrahim Tore 27', Hadi Aghili 90'(P)	Mohsen Bengar, Shahin Khayri	-	15,000	Hedayat Mombeini	1
18	2009-Dec-05	Sepahan	2-0	Esteghlal	Foolad Shahr/Esfahan	Emad Mohamad Redha 45', Hadi Aghili 62'(P)	-	-	15,000	Masoud Moradi	1
19	2009-Dec-12	Mes Kerman	2-3	Sepahan	Shahid Bahonar /Kerman	Mohsen Bengar 7', Emad Mohamad Redha 42', Ebrahim Tore 45+2'	Shahin Khayri	-	5,000	Saeed Mozafari Zadeh	1
20	2009-Dec-18	Sepahan	1-1 45'	Moghavemat	Foolad Shahr/Esfahan	Hadi Aghili 16'	Ebrahim Tore, Ehsan Hajsafi, Hadi Aghili	?	?	Alireza Faghani	1
21	2010-Jan-08	Est. Ahvaz	0-5	Sepahan	Takhti/Ahvaz	-	-	-	-	-	-
22	2010-Jan-15	Sepahan	1–1	Foolad	Foolad Shahr/Esfahan	-	-	-	-	-	-
23	2010-Jan-22	Pas Hamedan	1–1	Sepahan	?	-	-	-	-	-	-
24	2010-Jan-29	Sepahan	2-0	Malavan	Foolad Shahr/Esfahan	-	-	-	-	-	-
25	2010-Feb-05	Saba Qom	2–2	Sepahan	Yadegar Emam/ Qom	-	-	-	-	-	-
26	2010-Feb-11	Sepahan	5-1	Saipa	Foolad Shahr/Esfahan	-	-	-	-	-	-
27	2010-Feb-19	Sepahan	0–1	Zob Ahan	Foolad Shahr/Esfahan	-	-	-	-	-	-
28	2010-Feb-26	Tractor Sazi	0–0	Sepahan	Yadegar Emam/Tabriz	-	-	-	-	-	-
29	2010-Mar-05	Sepahan	2-0	Shahin Bushehr	Foolad Shahr/Esfahan	-	-	-	-	-	-
30	2010-Mar-12	Steel Azin	2-1	Sepahan	Takhti/ Tehran	-	-	-	-	-	-
31	2010-Mar-16	Sepahan	2-0	Rah Ahan	Foolad Shahr/Esfahan	-	-	-	-	-	-
32	2010-Apr-09	Aboomoslem	2–2	Sepahan	Samen/Mashhad	Mohamad Hassan Rajabzadeh 6', Vahid Asgari 79'	Emad Mohamad Redha 17', Ehsan Hajsafi 76'	-	-	-	-
33	2010-Apr-16	Sepahan	2-1	Paykan	Foolad Shahr/Esfahan	Ebrahim Tore 3', 85'	Alireza Abbasfard 30'	-	-	-	-
34	2010-Apr-23	Persepolis	-	Sepahan	Azadi /Tehran	-	-	-	-	-	-

=== Results by round ===
Round	1	2	3	4	5	6	7	8	9	10	11	12	13	14	15	16	17	18	19	20	21	22	23	24	25	26	27	28	29	30	31	32	33	34
Ground	A	H	A	H	A	H	A	H	A	A	H	A	H	A	H	A	H	H	A	H	A	H	A	H	A	H	H	A	H	A	H	A	H	A
Result	L	W	L	W	D	W	D	W	D	D	W	W	L	W	W	W	W	W	W															
Position	15	6	12	8	7	5	6	5	5	4	4	2	3	1	1	1	1	1	1	1														

Updated to match(es) played on 18 December 2009. Source: "Ipl".
A = Away; H = Home; W = Win; D = Draw; L = Loss

=== Results summary ===
Overall								Home						Away					
Pld	W	D	L	GF	GA	GD	Pts	W	D	L	GF	GA	GD	W	D	L	GF	GA	GD
19	12	4	3	35	16	+19	40	8	0	1	22	6	+16	4	4	2	13	10	+3

=== League standings ===
Pos	Team	Pld	W	D	L	GF	GA	GD	Pts	Qualification or relegation
1	Sepahan (C)	34	19	10	5	67	30	+37	67	Qualification for the 2011 AFC Champions League
2	Zob Ahan	34	16	13	5	48	29	+19	61	Qualification for the 2011 AFC Champions League
3	Esteghlal	34	16	11	7	49	32	+17	59	Qualification for the 2011 AFC Champions League
4	Persepolis	34	13	14	7	46	40	+6	53	Qualification for the 2011 AFC Champions League
5	Steel Azin	34	13	13	8	55	49	+6	52	

Updated to match(es) played on 01 SEP 2018. Source: IPL Stats, Soccerway
Rules for classification: 1) Points; 2) Goal difference; 3) Goals scored.
(C) Champions

=== Top scorers and assists ===
==== Goal scorers ====
10 Goals

- (Iraq) Emad Mohammed

6 Goals

- (Iran) Ahmad Jamshidian

5 Goals

- (Senegal) Ibrahima Touré

3 Goals

- (Iran) Farzad Hatami
- (Iran) Ehsan Hajsafi
- (Iran) Hadi Aghily

2 Goals

- (Iran) Mehdi Jafarpour

1 Goal

- (Iran) Ahmad Alenemeh
- (Iran) Javad Maheri
- (Iran) Mohsen Bengar

==== Assists ====
7 Assists

- (Iran) Ehsan Hajsafi

4 Assists

- (Iran) Ahmad Jamshidian

2 Assists

- (Iran) Jalal Hosseini
- (Senegal) Ibrahima Touré

1 Assist

- (Iran) Hossein Papi
- (Iran) Mehdi Karimian
- (Iran) Mehdi Jafarpour
- (Iran) Mohsen Bengar
- (Iran) Moharram Navidkia

==== Cards ====
Player	Yellow card	Yellow card Red card	Red card
(Senegal) Ibrahima Touré	4	1	0
(Iran) Ehsan Hajsafi	4	0	0
(Iran) Hadi Aghily	2	1	0
(Iran) Mehdi Jafarpour	3	0	0
(Iran) Shahin Kheiri	3	0	0
(Iran) Ahmad Alenemeh	2	0	0
(Iran) Mehdi Rahmati	2	0	0
(Iran) Mohsen Bengar	1	0	0
(Iran) Farzad Hatami	1	0	0
(Iran) Jalal Hosseini	1	0	0
Total cards	23	2	0

==== Matches played ====
18 Matches

- (Iran) Mohsen Bengar
- (Iran) Jalal Hosseini

17 Matches

- (Iran) Shahin Kheiri
- (Iran) Mehdi Rahmati

== Asian Champions League ==
=== Group C ===
Pos	Team	Pld	W	D	L	GF	GA	GD	Pts	Qualification	SHB	PAK	SEP	AIN
1	(Saudi Arabia) Al-Shabab	6	3	1	2	10	8	+2	10	Advance to knockout stage	—	2–1	1–1	3–2
2	(Uzbekistan) Pakhtakor	6	3	0	3	8	10	−2	9	Advance to knockout stage	1–3	—	2–1	3–2
3	(Iran) Sepahan	6	2	2	2	5	5	0	8		1–0	2–0	—	0–0
4	(United Arab Emirates) Al-Ain	6	2	1	3	8	8	0	7		2–1	0–1	2–0	—

Source: AFC Champions League Official Page

== Squad changes during 2009/10 season ==
=== In ===
No.	Position	Player	Age	Moving from	League	Transfer Window	Ref
1	GK	(Iran) Mehdi Rahmati	26	(Iran) Mes Kerman	Iran Pro League	Summer	
6	DF	(Iran) Jalal Hosseini	27	(Iran) Saipa	Iran Pro League	Summer	
14	DF	(Iran) Ahmad Alenemeh	27	(Iran) Foolad	Iran Pro League	Summer	
11	MF	(Iran) Mehdi Karimian	29	(Iran) Bargh Shiraz	(Iran) Azadegan League	Summer	
12	MF	(Iran) Shahin Kheiri	29	(Iran) Zob Ahan	Iran Pro League	Summer	
19	MF	(Senegal) Ibrahima Touré	23	(Iran) Persepolis	Iran Pro League	Summer	

=== Out ===
No.	Position	Player	Age	Moving to	League	Transfer Window	Ref
6	DF	(Iran) Jalal Akbari	26	(Iran) Persepolis F.C.	Iran Pro League	Summer	
10	MF	(Iran) Farshad Bahadorani	27	(Iran) Aboomoslem	Iran Pro League	Summer	
25	MF	(Iran) Ebrahim Lovinian	31	(Iran) Aboomoslem	Iran Pro League	Summer	
27	MF	(Iran) Abolhassan Jafari	19	(Iran) Malavan	Iran Pro League	Summer	
33	MF	(Iran) Rasoul Khatibi	31	(Iran) Foolad Gostar	(Iran) Azadegan League	Summer	
40	MF	(Cameroon) Jacques Elong Elong	28	(Slovakia) Dunajská Streda	(Slovakia) Slovak Superliga	Summer	
11	FW	(Iran) Hadi Asghari	28	(Iran) Pas Hamedan	Iran Pro League	Summer	
