= Mohsen Bengar =

Iranian footballer (born 1979)

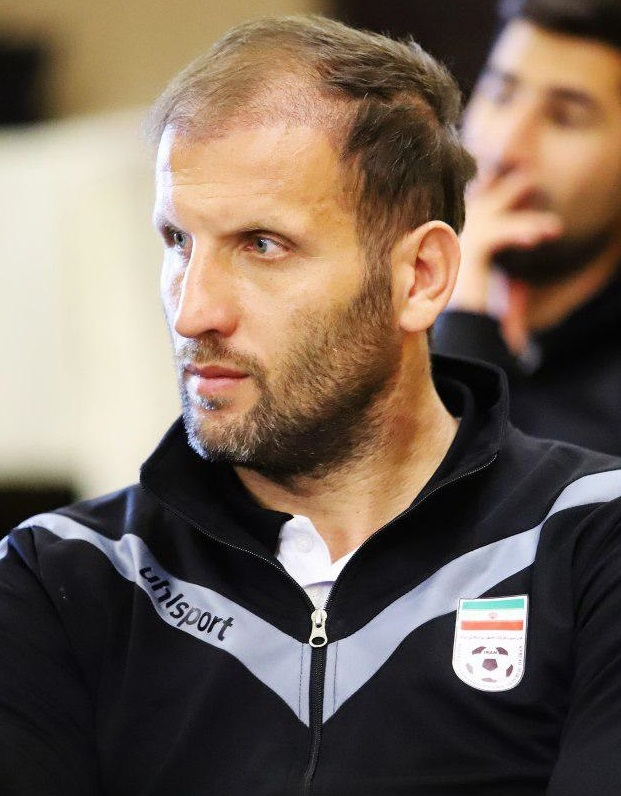
- Bengar in 2019

Personal information
- Full name: Mohsen Bengar
- Date of birth: July 6, 1979 (age 47)
- Place of birth: Nur, Iran
- Height: 1.91 m (6 ft 3 in)
- Position: Centre back

Team information
- Current team: Omid Vahdat (head coach)

Senior career*
Years	Team	Apps	(Gls)
2001–2004	Shamoushak	88	(6)
2004–2012	Sepahan	205	(12)
2012–2016	Persepolis	99	(2)
2016–2017	Tractor	12	(0)
2017–2018	Naft Tehran	38	(4)
2018–2019	Pars Jonoubi	12	(1)
2019–2020	Karoon Arvand	13	(0)

International career^{‡}
2003–2014	Iran	14	(0)

Managerial career
- 2020–2021: Pars Jonoubi (assistant)
- 2021–2022: Shahrdari Noshahr
- 2022–: Omid Vahdat
- * Club domestic league appearances and goals as of 10 March 2016 ‡ National team caps and goals as of 3 March 2014

Mohsen Bengar (Persian: محسن بنگر, born 6 July 1979 in Nur) is a retired Iranian football defender and current coach.

== Club career ==
=== Early career ===
He began his career in Shamoushak Noshahr, then moved to Sepahan in 2004 and won two Hazfi Cup titles, also playing in the AFC Champions League and FIFA Club World Cup for Sepahan. He could not play as many matches as before in the 2008–09 season due to injuries, but in the next season he was a regular player in the defence despite the signing of Jalal Hosseini. He won the league with Sepahan three times in a row in 2010, 2011 and 2012. He announced that he would leave the team after eight years at the end of the 2011–12 season.

=== Persepolis ===
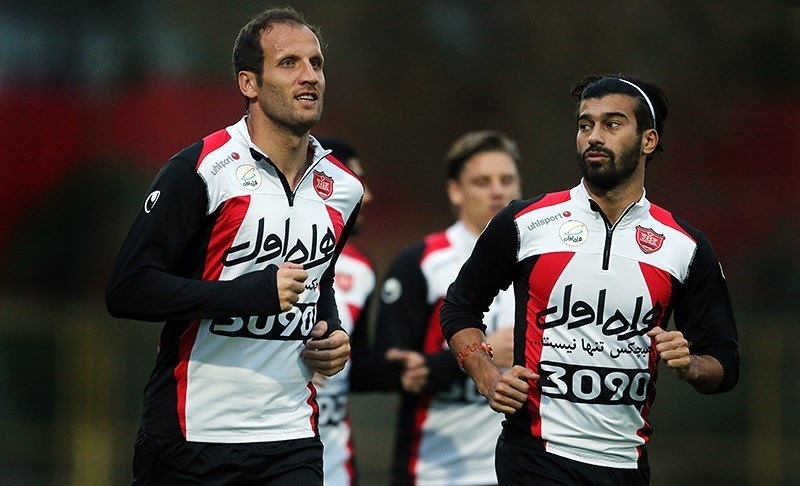
Mohsen Bengar and Ramin Rezaeian in Persepolis training

He signed a two-year contract with Tehran's reds until the end of the 2013–14 Season. On 24 May 2014, he extended his contract with Persepolis for two years, keeping him in the team till 2016. Bengar scored his first goal for Persepolis on 5 September 2014 in a 3–1 loss to Tractor. He also scored Persepolis' first goal in the 2015 AFC Champions League on 24 February 2015 in a 3–0 win against Lekhwiya.

=== Club career statistics ===
As of 8 May 2018.

Club	Division	Season	League		Hazfi Cup		Asia		Total	
Club	Division	Season	Apps	Goals	Apps	Goals	Apps	Goals	Apps	Goals
Shamoushak	Pro League	2003–04	22	2			–	–		
Sepahan	Pro League	2004–05	22	0			5	1		
Sepahan	Pro League	2005–06	26	0	0	0	–	–	26	0
Sepahan	Pro League	2006–07	22	4	2	0	10	0	34	4
Sepahan	Pro League	2007–08	29	2	2	0	4	0	35	2
Sepahan	Pro League	2008–09	18	0	1	0	4	0	23	0
Sepahan	Pro League	2009–10	32	1	2	0	5	1	39	2
Sepahan	Pro League	2010–11	28	4	4	0	8	0	40	4
Sepahan	Pro League	2011–12	28	1	1	0	7	2	36	3
Persepolis	Pro League	2012–13	24	0	5	0	–	–	29	0
Persepolis	Pro League	2013–14	29	0	2	0	–	–	31	0
Persepolis	Pro League	2014–15	23	2	3	1	4	1	30	4
Persepolis	Pro League	2015–16	23	0	3	0	–	–	28	0
Tractor	Pro League	2016–17	15	0	0	0	–	–	15	0
Naft Tehran	Pro League	2017–18	23	4	1	0	–	–	24	4
Pars Jonoubi	Pro League	2018–19	8	1	0	0	–	–	8	1
Career totals			372	21			47	5		

- Assist Goals

Season	Team	Assists
05–06	Sepahan	2
07–08	Sepahan	1
09–10	Sepahan	3
10–11	Sepahan	1
11–12	Sepahan	2
12–13	Persepolis	1
13–14	Persepolis	0
14–15	Persepolis	0

== International career ==
He was invited to Team Melli for some matches but he did not play that much; finally after good games for Sepahan in different competitions he found some place for himself and started the game against Kuwait in 2010 FIFA World Cup Qualifying. He won the West Asian Football Federation Championship 2008 with Team Melli. He played a match against UAE in 2011 Asian Cup.

== Honours ==
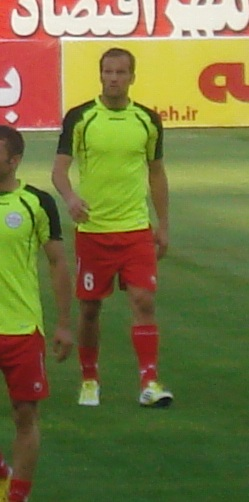
Bengar in a match against Naft Tehran, 23 August 2013

=== Club ===
Sepahan

- Iran Pro League (3): 2009–10, 2010–11, 2011–12, runner-up 2007–08
- Hazfi Cup (2): 2005–06, 2006–07
- AFC Champions League runner-up: 2007

Persepolis

- Iran Pro League runner-up: 2013–14, 2015–16
- Hazfi Cup runner-up: 2012–13

=== Country ===
Iran

- WAFF Championship (1): 2008
