= Karimian =

Karimian (Persian: کریمیان) is an Iranian surname. Notable people with the surname include:

- Mehdi Karimian (born 1980), Iranian footballer
- Mehrdad Karimian (born 1982), Iranian footballer and coach
- Saeed Karimian (1972–2017), Iranian television executive
- Sina Karimian (born 1988), Iranian kickboxer
