= Omid Dorreh =

Iranian footballer

Personal information
- Date of birth: 8 August 1999 (age 27)
- Place of birth: Tehran, Iran
- Height: 1.86 m (6 ft 1 in)
- Position: Defender

Team information
- Current team: Shahrdari Ardabil

Youth career
- 2015–2018: Saipa
- 2015–2016: → Ravan (loan)

Senior career*
Years	Team	Apps	(Gls)
2018–2022	Saipa	10	(0)
2022	Qashqai Shiraz	2	(1)
2022	Omid Vahdat		
2022–2023	Navad Urmia		
2023	Panik		
2023–2024	Chala Sangesar		
2024–2025	Malavan Tehran		
2025–	Shahrdari Ardabil		

International career^{‡}
2017	Iran U20	4	(0)
2018–2019	Iran U23	3	(0)
- * Club domestic league appearances and goals as of 7 June 2022 ‡ National team caps and goals as of 21 January 2019

Omid Dorreh (Persian: امید دُره; born 8 August 1999) is an Iranian footballer who plays as a defender for Shahrdari Ardabil.

== Club career ==
=== Saipa ===
He made his debut for Saipa in 13th fixtures of 2018–19 Iran Pro League against Padideh while he substituted in for Abdollah Nasseri.
