= Rahman Ahmadi =

Iranian goalkeeper

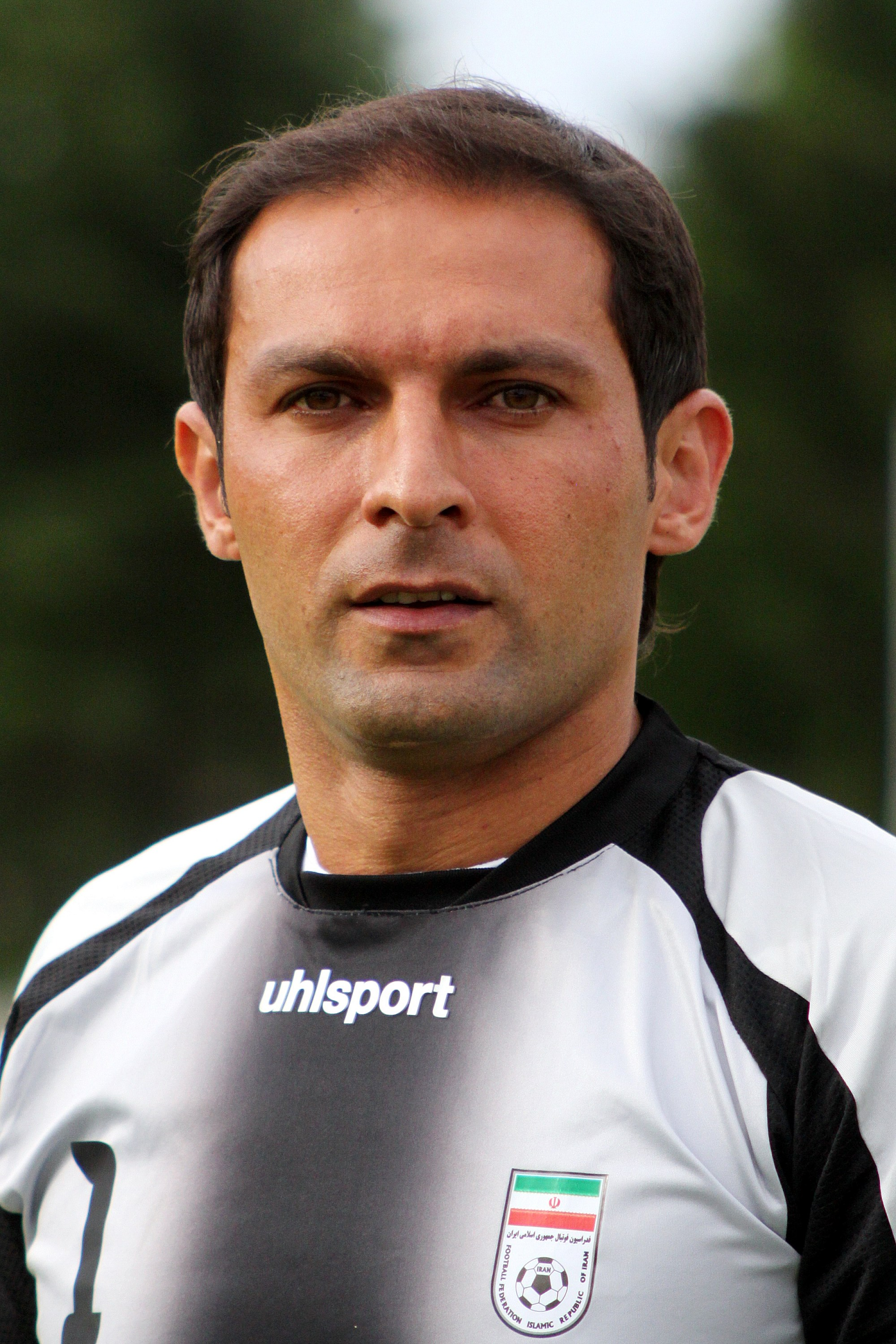
- Ahmadi playing with Iran in 2014

Personal information
- Full name: Rahman Ahmadi
- Date of birth: 30 July 1980 (age 46)
- Place of birth: Noshahr, Iran
- Height: 1.84 m (6 ft 0 in)
- Position: Goalkeeper

Youth career
- 1998–2000: Shamoushak

Senior career*
Years	Team	Apps	(Gls)
2000–2004	Shamoushak	35	(0)
2004–2008	Saipa	66	(0)
2008–2010	Sepahan	26	(0)
2010–2011	Persepolis	14	(0)
2011–2012	Sepahan	32	(0)
2012–2013	Saipa	33	(0)
2013–2016	Sepahan	60	(0)
2016–2018	Paykan	36	(0)
2018–2019	Pars Jonoubi	16	(0)
Total		328	(0)

International career^{‡}
2008–2014	Iran	11	(0)

Managerial career
- 2020–2022: Sepahan (goalkeeping coach)
Medal record
Representing Iran
West Asian Football Federation Championship
Gold medal – first place	2008 Iran	Team competition
- * Club domestic league appearances and goals as of 28 May 2017 ‡ National team caps and goals as of 26 May 2014

Rahman Ahmadi (Persian: رحمان احمدی, born 30 July 1980 in Noshahr, Iran) is an Iranian retired goalkeeper and coach.

== Club career ==
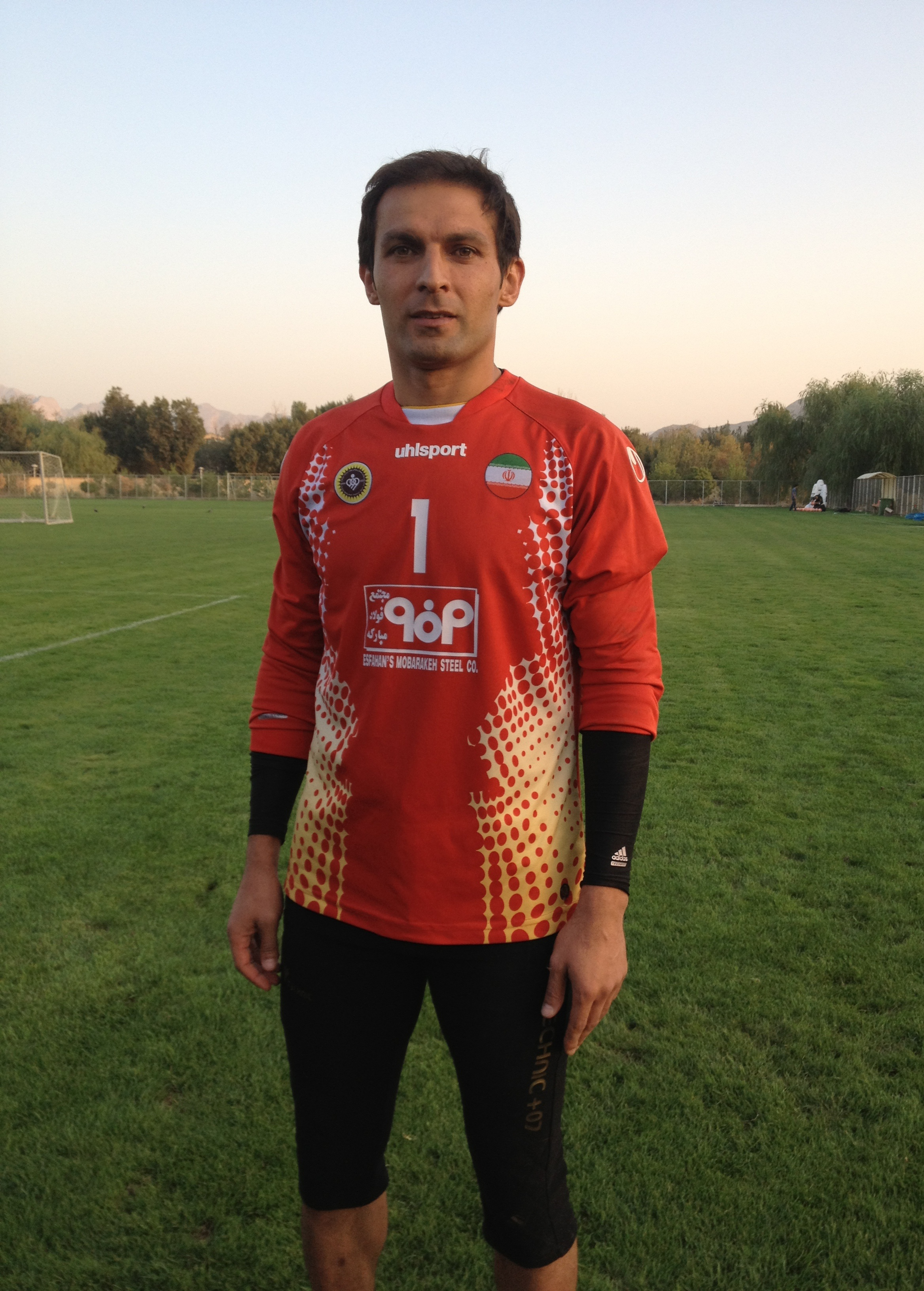
Ahmadi in training with Sepahan in 2013

=== Early career ===
Ahmadi started his career as a youth player at Shamoushak Noshahr in 1998. In 2000, he was promoted to the first team, he played four years for Shamoushak before being transferred to Saipa, where he won the league in 2007.

=== Sepahan ===
He moved to Sepahan in summer 2008 and was a regular player in his first season. In his second season with Sepahan, Ahmadi won the Iran Pro League although he only made four appearances throughout the season.

=== Saipa & Persepolis ===
In 2010 Ahmadi signed a contract with Tehran club Persepolis. He made 16 total appearances throughout the season. Disappointed with his playing time, Ahmadi returned to Sepahan in 2011. He made 38 appearances throughout the season as he led Sepahan to a Iran Pro League. He returned to Saipa in summer 2012 and made 33 appearances.

=== Return to Sepahan ===
He joined Sepahan for a third time in July 2013. He helped Sepahan attain a 4th-place finish in the 2013–14 Iran Pro League season, and was widely considered one of the best goalkeepers in the league with 15 clean sheets, only Nilson Corrêa Júnior was better.

=== Club career statistics ===
Last Update 1 July 2017

Club performance			League		Cup		Continental		Total	
Season	Club	League	Apps	Goals	Apps	Goals	Apps	Goals	Apps	Goals
Iran			League		Hazfi Cup		Asia		Total	
2003–04	Shamoushak	Pro League	22	0		0	–	–		0
2004–05	Saipa	Pro League	22	0		0	–	–		0
2005–06	Saipa	Pro League	15	0		0	–	–		0
2006–07	Saipa	Pro League	19	0		0	–	–		0
2007–08	Saipa	Pro League	10	0		0	4	0		0
2008–09	Sepahan	Pro League	22	0	1	0	6	0	29	0
2009–10	Sepahan	Pro League	4	0	1	0	0	0	5	0
2010–11	Persepolis	Pro League	13	0	0	0	3	0	16	0
2011–12	Sepahan	Pro League	32	0	1	0	6	0	38	0
2012–13	Saipa	Pro League	33	0	1	0	–	–	32	0
2013–14	Sepahan	Pro League	27	0	1	0	3	0	31	0
2014–15	Sepahan	Pro League	17	0	0	0	–	–	17	0
2015–16	Sepahan	Pro League	16	0	4	0	3	0	22	0
2016–17	Paykan	Pro League	29	0	2	0	–	–	31	0
2017–18	Paykan	Pro League	7	0	0	0	–	–	7	0
Career total			287	0	11	0	25	0	323	0

== International career ==
In 2008, Ahmadi made his debut for Iran the final of West Asian Football Federation Championship against Jordan, with Team Melli going on to win the competition. After Mehdi Rahmati announced his temporary retirement in 2013, Ahmadi was made the number one goalkeeper of the Iranian team by Carlos Queiroz. Ahmadi was instrumental in helping Iran secure a place in the 2014 FIFA World Cup, as his double-save ensured a 1–0 Iran win over South Korea.

On 1 June 2014, he was called into Iran's 2014 FIFA World Cup squad by Carlos Queiroz. However, he did not made any appearance for the team, where Alireza Haghighi started all the games for Iran.

== Honours ==
Shamoushak

- Azadegan League (1): 2002–03

Saipa

- Iran Pro League (1): 2006–07

Sepahan

- Iran Pro League (3): 2009–10, 2011–12, 2014–15

Persepolis

- Hazfi Cup (1): 2010–11

Iran

- West Asian Championship (1): 2008
