= Sirous Sangchouli =

Iranian footballer

Personal information
- Date of birth: 8 December 1982 (age 43)
- Place of birth: Mashhad, Iran
- Height: 1.86 m (6 ft 1 in)
- Position: Goalkeeper

Youth career
- 1996–2001: Payam Paykan

Senior career*
| Years | Team | Apps | (Gls) |
| 2001–2009 | Payam Khorasan | 58 | (0) |
| 2009–2012 | Fajr Sepasi | 40 | (0) |
| 2012–2013 | Foolad Yazd | 14 | (0) |
| 2013–2014 | Siahjamegan Mashhad | 23 | (0) |
| 2014–2015 | Mes Kerman | 8 | (0) |
| 2015 | Khoneh Be Khoneh | 18 | (0) |

Managerial career
- 2017–2018: Sanat Khorasan
- 2018–2020: Padideh U23
- 2020–2021: Mohajer Novin Mashhad
- 2021: Shahr Khodro (goalkeeping coach)
- 2022: Naft M.I.S (goalkeeping coach)
- 2022: Omid Vahdat
- 2022–2023: Fajr Sepasi (goalkeeping coach)
- 2023–2024: Mehr Razavi
- 2024: Shadkam
- * Club domestic league appearances and goals

Sirous Sangchouli (Persian: سیروس سنگچولی; born 8 December 1982) is an Iranian association football coach and a former goalkeeper.

== Club career ==
=== Club career statistics ===
As of 11 December 2014

| Club | Division | Season | League | | Hazfi Cup | | Total | |
| Club | Division | Season | Apps | Goals | Apps | Goals | Apps | Goals |
|---|---|---|---|---|---|---|---|---|
| Payam | Pro League | 2008–09 | 21 | 0 | | | | |
| Moghavemat/Fajr | Pro League | 2009–10 | 14 | 0 | | | | |
| Moghavemat/Fajr | Division 1 | 2010–11 | 17 | 0 | | | | |
| Moghavemat/Fajr | Pro League | 2011–12 | 9 | 0 | | | | |
| Foolad Yazd | Division 1 | 2012–13 | 14 | 0 | | | | |
| Siahjamegan | Division 1 | 2013–14 | 23 | 0 | | | | |
| Mes Kerman | Division 1 | 2014–15 | 8 | 0 | | | | |
| Career Total | | | 106 | 0 | | | | |

== Honours ==
Payam Khorasan

- Azadegan League : Champion 2007–08
