= Jalal Hosseini =

Iranian footballer (born 1982)

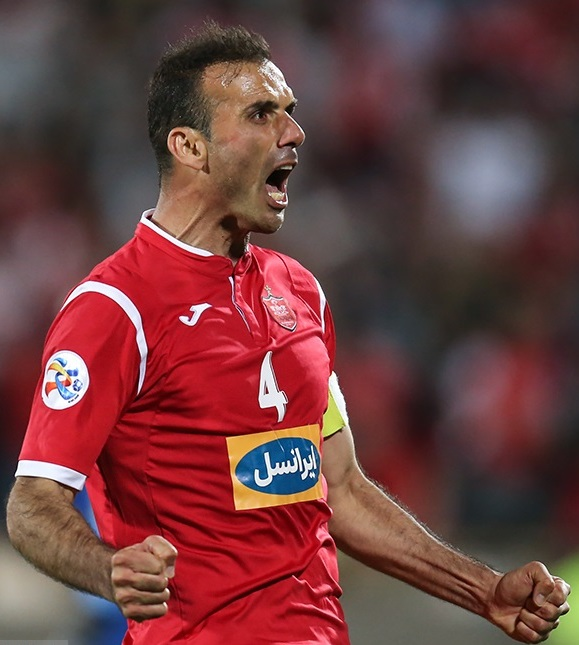
- Hosseini with Persepolis in 2018

Personal information
- Full name: Seyed Jalal Hosseini Khoshkebijari
- Date of birth: 3 February 1982 (age 44)
- Place of birth: Bandar Anzali, Iran
- Height: 1.82 m (6 ft 0 in)
- Position: Centre back

Team information
- Current team: Persepolis B (manager)

Senior career*
Years	Team	Apps	(Gls)
2002–2005	Malavan	84	(2)
2005–2009	Saipa	117	(8)
2009–2012	Sepahan	94	(4)
2012–2014	Persepolis	57	(2)
2014–2015	Al Ahli	26	(0)
2015–2016	Naft Tehran	24	(2)
2016–2022	Persepolis	138	(6)
Total		576	(24)

International career
2006–2010	Iran Olympic	13	(5)
2007–2018	Iran	115	(8)

Managerial career
- 2022–2025: Persepolis (assistant)
- 2026–: Persepolis B
- 2026–: Iran U23 (assistant)
Medal record
Representing Iran
Men's Football
Asian Games
Bronze medal – third place	2006 Qatar	Team competition
- * Club domestic league appearances and goals

Seyyed Jalal Hosseini (Persian: سید جلال حسینی; born 3 February 1982), commonly known as Seyyed Jalal or Jalal Hosseini, is a former Iranian professional footballer who played as a centre-back and was the captain of Iranian club Persepolis.

He has been a member of Iran's under-23 side as a wild card player on two occasions, in the 2006 and 2010 Asian Games, winning a bronze medal in 2006. Hosseini has represented Iran at the 2007 AFC Asian Cup, 2011 AFC Asian Cup, 2015 AFC Asian Cup and the 2014 FIFA World Cup.

== Early life and education ==
Hosseini was born on 3 February 1982 in Bandar-e Anzali, Gilan Province. He majored in German Studies.

== Club career ==
=== Saipa ===
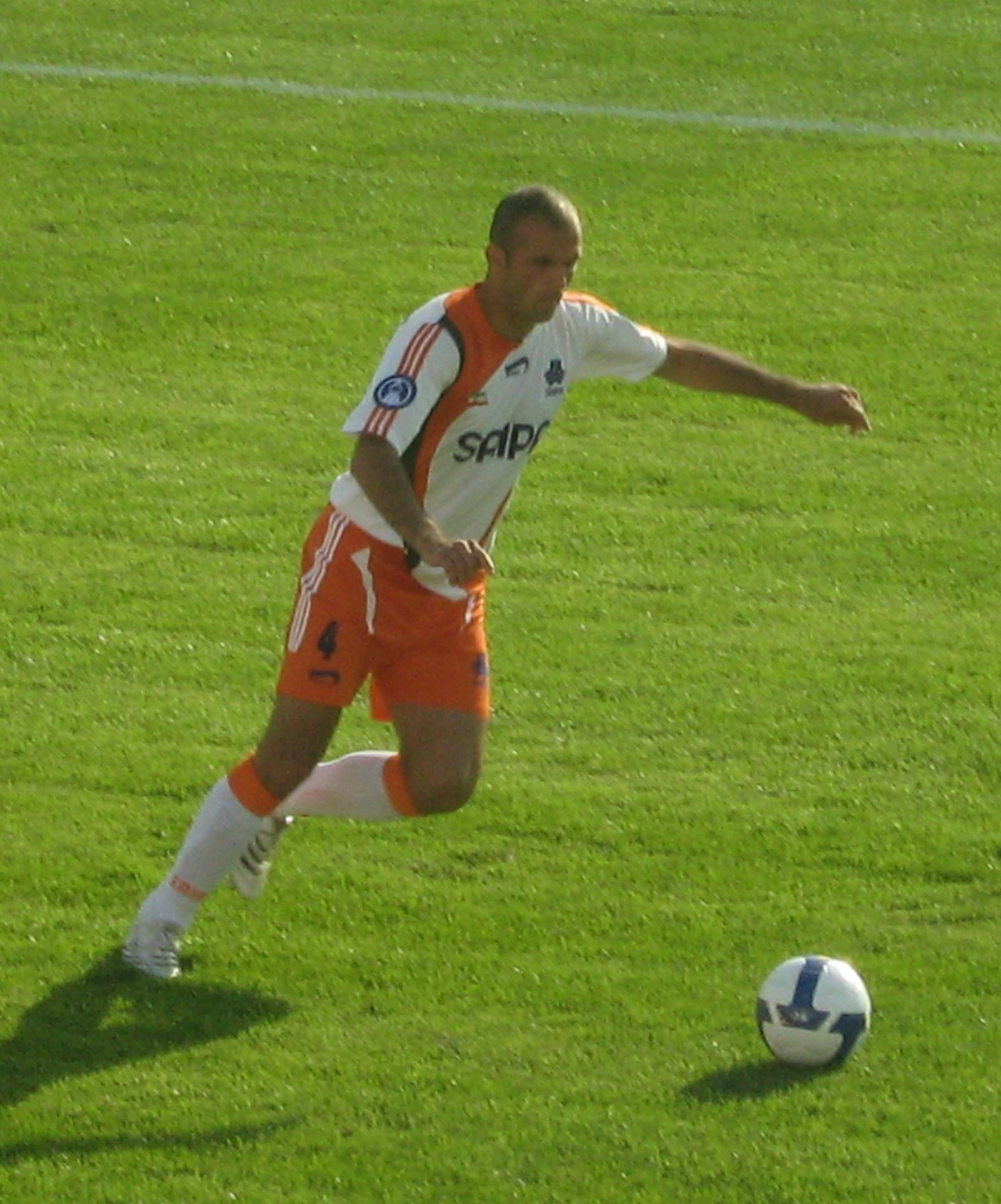
Hosseini playing for Saipa in a 2008 AFC Champions League match

Hosseini moved from Malavan to Saipa in summer 2005. Before that he was link with a move to Persepolis but the move was cancelled. During the 2005–06 season, he was the most consistent player for his club, making 28 full appearances and scoring one goal. He continued his solid performance for Saipa during the 2006–07 season with 26 full appearances and one goal and also won the league. He also played in the AFC Champions League matches for Saipa.

=== Sepahan ===
Hosseini signed for Sepahan in summer 2009 and became their regular player for the season. He won the Persian Gulf Cup for three times in a row with Sepahan. After three years and 94 league appearances, Hosseini left the club in 2012 as one of the league's most established centre-backs.

=== Persepolis ===
Hosseini signed a one-year contract with Tehran's reds until the end of 2012–13 Season. He extended his contract with Persepolis for one year in February 2013, keeping him in the team till 2014. He was regarded as the Iran Pro League's best defender. He was one of the main players in persepolis' second place league finish in 2014. Hosseini was named the best defender in the 2013–14 season.

=== Al-Ahli ===
On 17 July 2014, Hosseini joined Qatar Stars League's Al-Ahli with signing a one-year contract. He left the club in May 2015.

=== Naft Tehran ===
Hosseini left Qatar and joined Persian Gulf Pro League runners–up Naft Tehran in the summer of 2015. With Hosseini Naft reached the quarter–finals of the 2015 AFC Champions League. Midway through the season, he and many Naft players and management had disputes with the board as they had not been paid. As a result of this he left the club before the 2016–17 season.

=== Persepolis ===
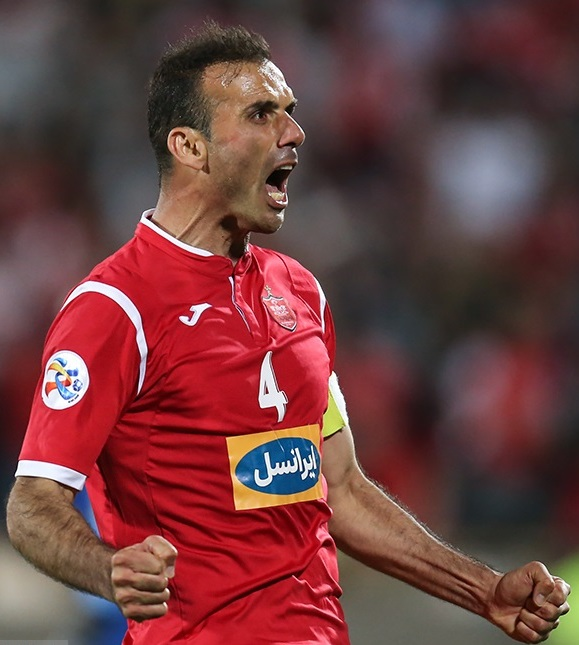
Hosseini celebrates scoring for Persepolis in the 2018 AFC Champions League

In spring of 2016, after days of negotiation, Hosseini announced he had signed with his former club Persepolis. Shortly after he was announced as the club captain for the 2016–17 season. He led Persepolis to a consecutive Persian Pro League in which he was an indisputable player and played a big role in team.

Asian Football Confederation website wrote Hosseini was a solid defender for Persepolis.

On 25 June 2022, Hosseini confirmed his retirement from football as a player. He called the decision "difficult" but "right". At this time, with 9 league titles, he is considered the most honorable and unattainable Iranian player in this regard. Varzesh 3, described his retirement as "start of the Superman in a coaching suit", hoping he will start coaching immediately.

== International career ==
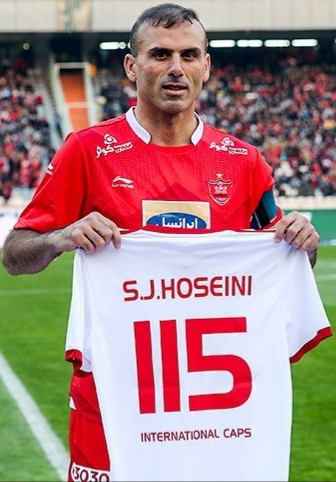
Iranian Football Federation appreciates Hosseini after his retirement from international football in 2018

Hosseini was a member of Iran U23 national team, participating in the 2006 Asian Games. He debuted for the senior national team in a friendly match against Belarus in February 2007.

Having joined Team Melli again in July 2007, he played in all four of Iran's matches and scored its first goal in its opening match at the 2007 Asian Cup against Uzbekistan. He was called again for the 2010 FIFA World Cup qualification and 2014 FIFA World Cup qualification matches. He also played in 2011 AFC Asian Cup qualification for Iran and 2015 AFC Asian Cup qualification. He featured in West Asian Football Federation Championship 2010 and 2011 Asian Cup. On 1 June 2014, he was called into Iran's 2014 FIFA World Cup squad by Carlos Queiroz. He was called into Iran's 2015 AFC Asian Cup squad on 30 December 2014 by Carlos Queiroz. In 2016, Hosseini was selected as one of the top 3 defenders in the world by France Football magazine in the 2018 FIFA World Cup qualification. In May 2018 he was named in Iran's preliminary squad for the 2018 World Cup in Russia but did not make the final 23. On 1 December 2018, Hosseini announced his retirement from international football.

== Player profile ==
=== Style of play ===
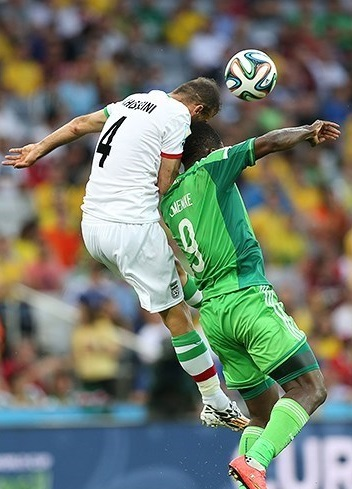
Hosseini (in white) playing for Iran at the 2014 FIFA World Cup

Hosseini is widely regarded as one of the greatest defenders in history of Iranian football. Also he is the most decorated player in Iranian football league. He was recognized for his tactical awareness, athleticism, and positional discipline, and contributed to the team's defensive organization through an aggressive playing style.

High running rate, fighting and cutting power and excellent leadership are the features of Hosseini's style of play. He is also mentioned as a player who respected the legacy of the Persepolis club, that is, ethics in sports.

== Personal life ==
During the Mahsa Amini protests, Hosseini supported fellow footballer Amir Reza Nasr Azadani, who was jailed as a result of the protests, by posting a picture of the latter with calls for the authorities to not execute Azadani.

== Career statistics ==
=== Club ===
Appearances and goals by club, season and competition
Club	Season	League			Cup (Note: Includes Hazfi Cup and Emir of Qatar Cup)		Continental (Note: Includes AFC Champions League)		Other		Total	
Club	Season	Division	Apps	Goals	Apps	Goals	Apps	Goals	Apps	Goals	Apps	Goals
Malavan	2002–03	Pro League	24	0	0	0	—		_		24	0
Malavan	2003–04	Azadegan League	30	0	0	0	—		_		30	0
Malavan	2004–05	Pro League	30	2	2	0	—		_		32	2
Malavan	Total		84	2	2	0	—		_		86	2
Saipa	2005–06	Pro League	28	1	0	0	—		_		28	1
Saipa	2006–07	Pro League	26	3	2	0	—		_		28	3
Saipa	2007–08	Pro League	34	1	1	0	4	0	_		39	1
Saipa	2008–09	Pro League	29	3	1	0	—		_		30	3
Saipa	Total		117	8	4	0	4	0	_		125	8
Sepahan	2009–10	Pro League	31	1	1	0	6	1	_		38	2
Sepahan	2010–11	Pro League	33	2	4	0	9	0	_		46	2
Sepahan	2011–12	Pro League	30	1	1	0	7	1	_		38	2
Sepahan	Total		94	4	6	0	22	2	_		122	6
Persepolis	2012–13	Pro League	30	1	5	0	—		_		35	1
Persepolis	2013–14	Pro League	27	1	2	0	—		_		29	1
Persepolis	Total		57	2	7	0	—		_		64	2
Al-Ahli	2014–15	QSL	25	0	1	0	—		_		26	0
Naft Tehran	2015–16	Pro League	24	2	1	0	3	0	_		28	2
Persepolis	2016–17	Pro League	27	1	0	0	8	0	_		35	1
Persepolis	2017–18	Pro League	20	0	2	0	13	1	_		35	1
Persepolis	2018–19	Pro League	29	1	5	0	5	1	_		39	2
Persepolis	2019–20	Pro League	18	0	3	0	1	0	_		22	0
Persepolis	2020–21	Pro League	25	4	2	0	10	2	1	0	38	6
Persepolis	2021–22	Pro League	19	0	1	0	2	0	1	0	23	0
Persepolis	Total		138	6	13	0	39	4	2	0	192	10
Career total			539	24	34	0	68	6	2	0	643	30

=== International ===
Appearances and goals by national team and year
National team	Year	Apps	Goals
Iran	2007	11	1
Iran	2008	16	1
Iran	2009	14	0
Iran	2010	12	1
Iran	2011	13	2
Iran	2012	8	0
Iran	2013	8	1
Iran	2014	7	0
Iran	2015	10	1
Iran	2016	9	1
Iran	2017	6 (Note: In some sources, Hosseini's national cap against Iraq on 18 March 2017 is not mentioned.)	0
Iran	2018	1	0
Total		115	8

Scores and results list Iran's goal tally first, score column indicates score after each Hosseini goal.

List of international goals scored by Jalal Hosseini
No.	Date	Venue	Opponent	Score	Result	Competition
1	11 July 2007	Bukit Jalil Stadium, Kuala Lumpur, Malaysia	Uzbekistan	1–1	2–1	2007 AFC Asian Cup
2	26 March 2008	Al Kuwait Sports Club Stadium, Kuwait City, Kuwait	Kuwait	2–0	2–2	2010 FIFA World Cup qualification
3	1 October 2010	Amman International Stadium, Amman, Jordan	Iraq	1–0	2–1	WAFF 2010
4	17 July 2011	Azadi Stadium, Tehran, Iran	Madagascar	1–0	1–0	Friendly
5	11 October 2011	Azadi Stadium, Tehran, Iran	Bahrain	1–0	6–0	2014 FIFA World Cup qualification
6	15 October 2013	Azadi Stadium, Tehran, Iran	Thailand	1–0	2–1	2015 AFC Asian Cup qualification
7	8 October 2015	Sultan Qaboos Sports Complex, Muscat, Oman	Oman	1–1	1–1	2018 WCQ and 2019 ACQ
8	6 October 2016	Bunyodkor Stadium, Tashkent, Uzbekistan	Uzbekistan	1–0	1–0	2018 FIFA World Cup qualification

== Honours ==
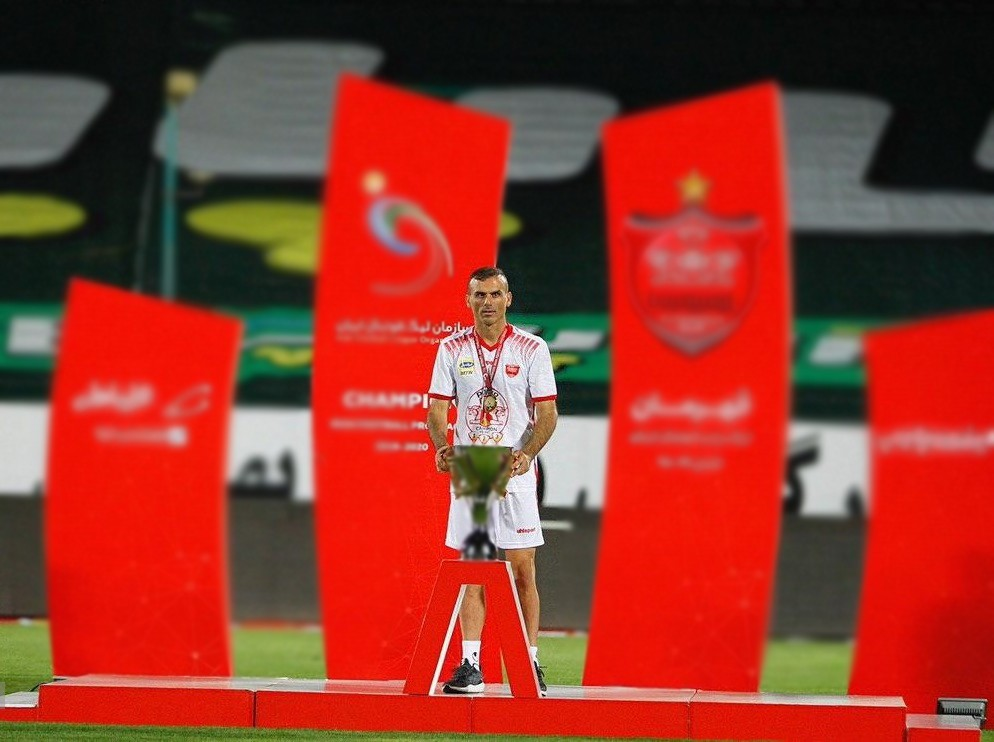
Hosseini celebrating after winning his 8th Persian Gulf Pro League trophy.

Saipa

- Persian Gulf Pro League: 2006–07

Sepahan

- Persian Gulf Pro League: 2009–10, 2010–11, 2011–12 (3)

Persepolis

- Persian Gulf Pro League: 2016–17, 2017–18, 2018–19, 2019–20, 2020–21 (5)
- Hazfi Cup: 2018–19
- Iranian Super Cup: 2017, 2018, 2019, 2020 (4)
- AFC Champions League runner-up: 2018, 2020

Iran U23 (Wild card)

- Asian Games Bronze Medal: 2006

Individual

- Persian Gulf Pro League Defender of the Year (6) : 2006–07, 2007–08, 2013–14, 2015–16, 2016–17, 2017–18, 2018–19
- Persian Gulf Pro League Team of the Year : 2013–14, 2015–16, 2016–17, 2017–18, 2018–19
- Navad Player of the Month: November 2017, December 2017
- AFC Champions League OPTA Best XI: 2018
- Iran's AFC Champions League Legend

== See also ==
- List of men's footballers with 100 or more international caps
