= Bruno Correa =

Brazilian footballer (born 1986)

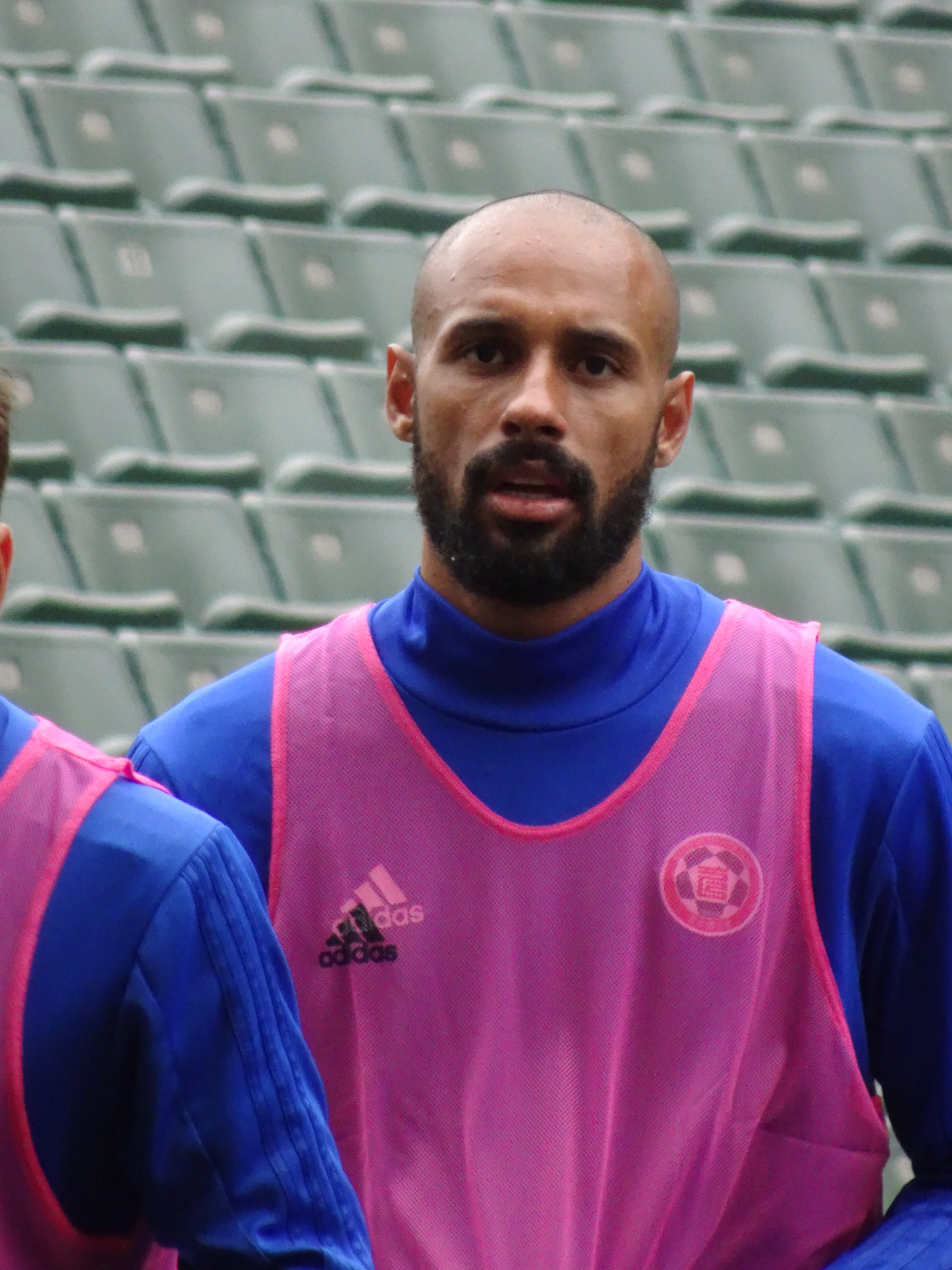
- Correa in 2018

Personal information
- Full name: Bruno César Correa
- Date of birth: 22 March 1986 (age 40)
- Place of birth: Brazil
- Height: 1.90 m (6 ft 3 in)
- Position: Forward

Team information
- Current team: Chainat Hornbill

Senior career*
Years	Team	Apps	(Gls)
2009–2010	Santos de Guápiles	21	(18)
2010	Incheon United	15	(1)
2011–2012	Banants	26	(16)
2012	Sepahan	14	(10)
2012–2013	Al Nasr	23	(16)
2013–2014	Dubai Club	12	(2)
2014	Guaratinguetá	5	(0)
2014	Botafogo	7	(0)
2015	Shonan Bellmare	7	(0)
2015	Bragantino	6	(1)
2016	Campinense	1	(0)
2017	Rio Branco	15	(2)
2017	Air Force Central	19	(4)
2018	Eastern	8	(4)
2019	Udon Thani	34	(18)
2020–	Chainat Hornbill	0	(0)
- * Club domestic league appearances and goals as of 13 May 2018

Bruno César Correa (Chinese: 般盧; born 22 March 1986), sometimes known as just Bruno is a Brazilian professional footballer who plays as a forward for Chainat Hornbill in Thai League 2.

== Career ==
Correa joined the Iranian champions Sepahan in 2012.

== Career statistics ==
Last Update 7 July 2012

Club performance			League		Cup		Continental		Total	
Season	Club	League	Apps	Goals	Apps	Goals	Apps	Goals	Apps	Goals
Iran			League		Hazfi Cup		Asia		Total	
2011-12	Sepahan	Pro League	14	7	0	0	7	5	21	12
Total	Iran		14	7	0	0	7	5	21	12
Total	Country		14	7	0	0	7	5	21	12

== Honours ==
Sepahan

- Iran Pro League: 2011–12

Individual

- Armenian Premier League best forward: 2010–11
