= Mohammad Hassan Rajabzadeh =

Iranian footballer (born 1983)

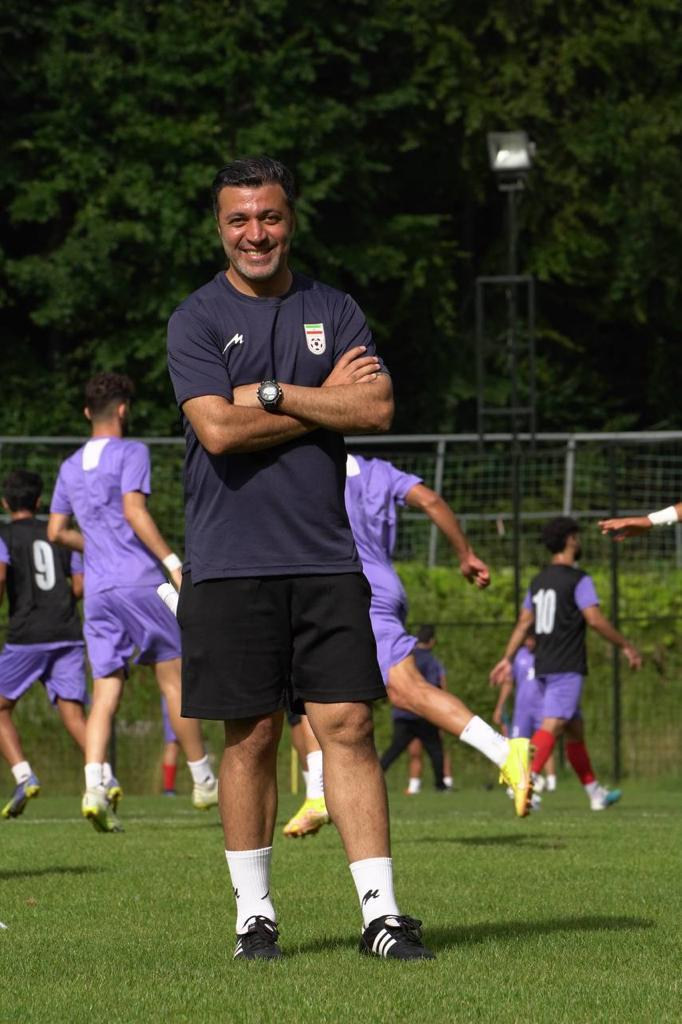

Personal information
- Full name: Mohammad Hassan Rajabzadeh Heravi
- Date of birth: 10 June 1983 (age 43)
- Place of birth: Mashhad, Iran
- Position: Midfielder

Team information
- Current team: Saipa (manager)

Youth career
- 2002–2004: Aboomoslem

Senior career*
Years	Team	Apps	(Gls)
2004–2007	Aboomoslem	17	(2)
2007–2009	Payam	49	(4)
2009–2010	Aboomoslem	29	(5)
2010–2012	Sepahan	21	(0)
2012	Malavan	16	(2)
2012–2013	Rah Ahan	27	(1)
2013–2015	Padideh	37	(3)
2015–2016	Paykan	27	(1)

Managerial career
- 2019: Qashqai (assistant)
- 2019–2022: Sorkhpooshan (assistant)
- 2023: Naft Masjed Soleyman (assistant)
- 2023: Iran U23 (assistant)
- 2023–2024: Paykan (assistant)
- 2025–2026: Saipa (assistant)
- 2026–: Saipa
- * Club domestic league appearances and goals

Mohammad Hassan Rajabzadeh (Persian: محمد حسن رجب زاده; born 10 June 1983) is an Iranian football coach and a former player.

== Club career ==
=== Club career statistics ===
Club performance			League		Cup		Continental		Total	
Season	Club	League	Apps	Goals	Apps	Goals	Apps	Goals	Apps	Goals
Iran			League		Hazfi Cup		Asia		Total	
2004–05	Aboomoslem	Pro League	2	0	0	0	-	-	2	0
2005–06	Aboomoslem	Pro League	5	1	0	0	-	-	5	1
2006–07	Aboomoslem	Pro League	10	1	0	0	-	-	10	1
2007–08	Payam	Azadegan League	19	2	0	0	-	-	19	2
2008–09	Payam	Pro League	30	2	0	0	-	-	30	2
2009–10	Aboomoslem	Pro League	29	5	0	0	-	-	29	5
2010–11	Sepahan	Pro League	11	0	0	0	3	0	14	0
2011–12	Sepahan	Pro League	10	0	0	0	2	0	12	0
2012	Malavan	Pro League	16	2	0	0	-	-	16	2
2012–13	Rah Ahan	Pro League	27	1	0	0	-	-	27	1
2013–14	Padideh	Azadegan League	20	2	0	0	-	-	20	2
2014–15	Padideh	Pro League	17	1	0	0	-	-	17	1
2015–16	Paykan	Azadegan League	27	1	0	0	–	–	27	1
Career total			223	18	0	0	5	0	228	0

== Honours ==
- 2nd Hazfi Cup 2004–05 with Aboomoslem
- Promoted to Persian Gulf League Azadegan League 2007–08 with Payam
- Persian Gulf Cup 2010–11 with Sepahan
- Persian Gulf Cup 2011–12 with Sepahan
- Azadegan League 2013–14 with Padideh
- Promoted to Persian Gulf League Azadegan League 2013–14 with Padideh
- Azadegan League 2015–16 with Paykan
- Promoted to Persian Gulf League Azadegan League 2015–16 with Paykan

== Coaching Honours ==
- 2nd Azadegan League 2020–21 with Havadar
- Promoted to Persian Gulf League Azadegan League 2020–21 with Havadar
- 2nd 2023 WAFF U-23 Championship with Iran U23
