= Sadeghi =

Sadeghi or Sadeqi (Persian: صادقی) is a surname. It is an attributive to Sadegh or Sadeq (صادق), which is a given name and means honest.

== People with the surname Sadeghi ==
- Afshin Sadeghi (b. 1993), Iranian theater director
- Ali Akbar Sadeghi (b. 1937), Iranian painter
- Ali Ashraf Sadeghi (b. 1941), Iranian linguist
- Amir Hossein Sadeghi (b. 1981), Iranian footballer
- Ebrahim Sadeghi (b. 1979), Iranian football player
- Ghotbeddin Sadeghi (b. 1952), Iranian theater director
- Jamileh Sadeghi (born 1958), Iranian businesswoman
- Manoochehr Sadeghi (b. 1938), Iranian-American musician
- Maryam Sadeghi, Iranian-born Canadian computer scientist and businesswoman
- Mohammad Sadeghi (actor) (born 1957), Iranian actor
- Mohammad Sadeghi (footballer, born 1952), Iranian footballer
- Mohammad Bagher Sadeghi (born 1989), Iranian footballer
- Reza Sadeghi (b. 1979), Iranian singer
- Sajjad Sadeghi (born 1983), Iranian political scientist and political prisoner
