= Amir Tahmouresi =

Iranian footballer

Personal information
- Full name: Amir Tahmouresi
- Date of birth: 8 April 1991 (age 35)
- Place of birth: Iran
- Height: 1.91 m (6 ft 3 in)
- Position: Center back

Team information
- Current team: Rah Ahan
- Number: 15

Youth career
- Mowj-e Genaveh
- 2001–2011: Bargh Shiraz

Senior career*
Years	Team	Apps	(Gls)
2008–2011	Bargh Shiraz	15	(0)
2011–	Rah Ahan	9	(0)

International career
2009–2010	Iran U-20	0	(0)
- * Club domestic league appearances and goals as of 11 May 2012 (UTC)

Amir Tahmouresi (Persian: امیر طهمورثی; born April 8, 1991) is an Iranian footballer who plays for Rah Ahan in the Iran's Premier Football League.

== Club career ==
Tahmouresi started his career with Bargh Shiraz. In summer 2011 he joined Rah Ahan by the coach, Ali Daei.

=== Club Career Statistics ===
Last Update 11 May 2012

Club performance			League		Cup		Continental		Total	
Season	Club	League	Apps	Goals	Apps	Goals	Apps	Goals	Apps	Goals
Iran			League		Hazfi Cup		Asia		Total	
2008–09	Bargh Shiraz	Pro League	6	0			–			
2009–10	Bargh Shiraz	Division 1	0	0			–			
2010–11	Bargh Shiraz	Division 1	9	0			–			
2011–12	Rah Ahan	Pro League	9	0			–			
2012–13	Rah Ahan	Pro League	0	0	0	0	–		0	0
Career total			24	0			0	0		
