= Hamid Reza Kazemi =

Iranian footballer

Personal information
- Date of birth: 6 May 1992 (age 34)
- Place of birth: Isfahan, Iran
- Height: 1.77 m (5 ft 10 in)
- Position: Midfielder

Youth career
- 2008–2012: Sepahan

Senior career*
Years	Team	Apps	(Gls)
2011–2014	Sepahan	1	(0)
2014–2015	Saba Qom	5	(0)
2015–2016	Giti Pasand	28	(2)
2016–2017	Nirooye Zamini		
2018–2019	Majees		
2020–2021	Foolad Koohestan		
2021	Sanat Abrisham		
2021–2022	Sepahan B		
2022–2023	Yazd Louleh		
2023–2024	Sepahan B		
- * Club domestic league appearances and goals as of 16 May 2016

Hamid Reza Kazemi (Persian: حمید رضا کاظمی; born 6 May 1992) is an Iranian footballer who plays as a midfielder.

== Club career ==
He joined Sepahan in the summer of 2011 and won the league in his first season.

=== Club career statistics ===
As of 15 May 2015

Club performance			League		Cup		Continental		Total	
Season	Club	League	Apps	Goals	Apps	Goals	Apps	Goals	Apps	Goals
Iran			League		Hazfi Cup		Asia		Total	
2011–12	Sepahan	Persian Gulf Cup	1	0	0	0	0	0	1	0
2012–13	Sepahan	Persian Gulf Cup	0	0	0	0	0	0	0	0
2013–14	Sepahan	Persian Gulf Cup	0	0	0	0	0	0	0	0
2014–15	Saba Qom	Persian Gulf Cup	0	0	0	0	0	0	0	0
2015–16	Giti Pasand	Division 1	11	1	0	0	0	0	11	1
Career total			12	1					12	1

== Honours ==
=== Club ===
Sepahan

- Iran Pro League (1):
  - 2011–12
- Hazfi Cup (1):
  - 2012–13
