= Mehdi Nasiri =

Iranian footballer

Personal information
- Full name: Mehdi Nasiri Dehaghani
- Date of birth: 11 November 1987 (age 39)
- Place of birth: Isfahan, Iran
- Height: 1.88 m (6 ft 2 in)
- Position: Defender

Youth career
- –2008: Sepahan

Senior career*
Years	Team	Apps	(Gls)
2008–2010	Sepahan Novin		
2010–2012	Sepahan	11	(0)
2012–2013	Shahin Bushehr	17	(0)
2013–2014	Sanat Naft		
2014–2016	Giti Pasand	23	(0)
2016–2018	Naghsheh Jahan		
2018–2020	PAS Hamedan		
- * Club domestic league appearances and goals

Mehdi Nasiri Dehaghani (Persian: مهدی نصیری; born 11 November 1987) is an Iranian former association footballer.

== Club career ==
=== Club career statistics ===
Last Update 24 November 2012

Club performance			League		Cup		Continental		Total	
Season	Club	League	Apps	Goals	Apps	Goals	Apps	Goals	Apps	Goals
Iran			League		Hazfi Cup		Asia		Total	
2010–11	Sepahan	Persian Gulf Cup	5	0			3	0	8	0
2011–12	Sepahan	Persian Gulf Cup	6	0	0	0	0	0	6	0
2012–13	Shahin Bushehr	Azadegan League	4	0					4	0
2013–14	Giti Pasand	Azadegan League	4	0					4	0
2014–15	Giti Pasand	Azadegan League	4	0					4	0
2015–16	Giti Pasand	Azadegan League	4	0					4	0
Career total			15	0			3	0	18	0

- Assist Goals

Season	Team	Assists
10–11	Sepahan	0
11–12	Sepahan	3

== Honours ==
=== Club ===
Sepahan

- Iran Pro League (2): 2010–11, 2011–12
