= Hassan Ashjari =

Iranian footballer (born 1979)

Personal information
- Full name: Hassan Ashjari
- Date of birth: 18 February 1979 (age 47)
- Place of birth: Fuman, Iran
- Height: 1.70 m (5 ft 7 in)
- Position: Defender

Team information
- Current team: Chooka Talesh F.C. (head coach)

Youth career
- 1999–2002: Malavan

Senior career*
Years	Team	Apps	(Gls)
2001–2005	Malavan	?	(?)
2005–2010	Zob Ahan	139	(2)
2010–2011	Steel Azin	28	(0)
2011–2012	Sepahan	38	(1)
2012–2013	Esteghlal	11	(1)
2013–2014	Malavan	1	(0)
2014	Pas Hamedan	11	(0)
2015–2017	Gilanmehr Fouman F.C.	?	(?)

International career^{‡}
2008–2010	Iran	13	(0)
- * Club domestic league appearances and goals as of 5 January 2014 ‡ National team caps and goals as of 11 August 2010

Hassan Ashjari (Persian: حسن اشجاری), born 18 February 1979 in Fuman, is an Iranian football player.

== Club career ==
He starts his professional career with his hometown team Malavan at 2001 in Iran Pro League and played 4 seasons in the team. Malavan was relegated to Azadegan League in 2003 and Ashjari had a great performance for Malavan and scored many goals and help the club to promote to Pro League once again. In 2005, he was transferred to Zob Ahan FC. His excellent performances made him to win the Team Melli shirt and was one of the key players for Zob Ahan in 2008–09 and 2009–10 seasons. He joined Still Azin in 2010 and stayed there for a season before joining Sepahan in 2011. He won the league in his first season with Sepahan. However, in the middle of the following season, due to what he described as personal problems, Ashjari decided to leave Sepahan. Despite rumours which stated Malavan as his next club, Ashjari joined Esteghlal on 5 December 2012. At the end of the season, he was transferred to Malavan, the club which he started his professional career there.

=== Club career statistics ===
- Last Update: 10 May 2013

Club performance			League		Cup		Continental		Total	
Season	Club	League	Apps	Goals	Apps	Goals	Apps	Goals	Apps	Goals
Iran			League		Hazfi Cup		Asia		Total	
2004–05	Malavan	Pro League	28	3	1	0	–		29	3
2005–06	Zob Ahan	Pro League	25	1	0	0	–		25	1
2006–07	Zob Ahan	Pro League	26	1	0	0	–		26	1
2007–08	Zob Ahan	Pro League	26	0	2	0	–		28	0
2008–09	Zob Ahan	Pro League	31	0	5	2	–		36	2
2009–10	Zob Ahan	Pro League	31	0	3	0	7	0	41	0
2010–11	Steel Azin	Pro League	28	0	2	0	–		30	0
2011–12	Sepahan	Pro League	23	1	1	0	5	1	29	2
2012–13	Sepahan	Pro League	15	0	0	0	2	0	17	0
2012–13	Esteghlal	Pro League	11	1	3	0	1	0	15	1
Career total			244	7	17	2	16	1	277	10

- Assists

Season	Team	Assists
05/06	Zob Ahan	2
06/07	Zob Ahan	1
07/08	Zob Ahan	3
08/09	Zob Ahan	8
09/10	Zob Ahan	8
10/11	Steel Azin	1
11/12	Sepahan	5
12/13	Esteghlal	2

== International career ==
He was a member of national team for a short period of time between 2008 and 2010. He played in 2010 FIFA World Cup qualification and 2011 AFC Asian Cup qualification for Team Melli and had been a regular Player. but after leaving Zob Ahan in 2010 he could not make it to national team anymore.

== Honours ==
=== Club ===
Zob Ahan

- Iran Pro League: 2008–09 (Runner-up), 2009–10 (Runner-up)
- Hazfi Cup: 2008–09

Sepahan

- Iran Pro League: 2011–12

Esteghlal

- Iran Pro League: 2012–13
