= Mehrdad Karimian =

Iranian footballer (born 1982)

Personal information
- Full name: Mehrdad Karimian
- Date of birth: September 20, 1983 (age 43)
- Place of birth: Bushehr
- Position: Midfielder

Team information
- Current team: Shahin Bushehr (assistant manager)

Youth career
- 2004–2006: Bargh Shiraz

Senior career*
Years	Team	Apps	(Gls)
2005–2008	Bargh Shiraz	80	(2)
2008–2009	Pas Hamedan	42	(3)
2009–2012	Moghavemat	68	(6)
2012–2013	Mes Kerman	14	(0)
2013–2016	Fajr Sepasi	19	(0)

Managerial career
- 2019–: Shahin Bushehr (assistant)
- 2019: Shahin Bushehr (caretaker)
- * Club domestic league appearances and goals as of 10 May 2013

Mehrdad Karimian (Persian: مهرداد كريميان, born September 20, 1982) is a retired Iranian footballer and current coach. Mehrdad is the younger brother of Mehdi Karimian, a former player.

== Club career ==
=== Club Career Statistics ===
Last Update 10 May 2013

Club performance			League		Cup		Continental		Total	
Season	Club	League	Apps	Goals	Apps	Goals	Apps	Goals	Apps	Goals
Iran			League		Hazfi Cup		Asia		Total	
2005–06	Bargh	Pro League	27	1			-	-		
2006–07	Bargh	Pro League	24	0			-	-		
2007–08	Bargh	Pro League	29	1	3	0	-	-	32	1
2008–09	Pas Hamedan	Pro League	30	2	3	0	-	-	33	2
2009–10	Pas Hamedan	Pro League	12	1	0	0	-	-	12	1
2009–10	Moghavemat	Pro League	17	2		0	-	-		2
2010–11	Moghavemat	Division 1	25	1			-	-		
2011–12	Moghavemat	Pro League	26	3	0	0	-	-	26	3
2012–13	Mes Kerman	Pro League	14	0	0	0	-	-	14	0
Career total			204	11			0	0		

- Assist Goals

Season	Team	Assists
05–06	Bargh	3
06–07	Bargh	6
07–08	Bargh	2
08–09	Pas	6
09–10	Pas	2
09–10	Moghavemat	5
