= Iman Kiani =

Iranian footballer

Personal information
- Date of birth: 19 October 1988 (age 38)
- Place of birth: Isfahan, Iran
- Height: 1.85 m (6 ft 1 in)
- Position: Defender

Team information
- Current team: Tara Foolad Chermahin

Youth career
- 2006–2007: Sepahan

Senior career*
Years	Team	Apps	(Gls)
2007–2011	Sepahan Novin		
2011–2012	Sepahan	1	(0)
2012–2016	Giti Pasand	49	(0)
2016–2017	Foolad Yazd	23	(0)
2017–2018	Bargh Jadid	12	(0)
2018–2019	Shahrdari Mahshahr	23	(1)
2019–2020	Khooshe Talaee	12	(0)
2020–2023	Van Pars		
2023–2024	Foolad Hormozgan		
2024–	Tara Foolad Chermahin		
- * Club domestic league appearances and goals as of 16 August 2020

Iman Kiani (Persian: ایمان کیانی; born 19 October 1988) is an Iranian footballer who plays for Tara Foolad Chermahin as a defender.

== Club career ==
He joined Sepahan in the summer of 2011 and won the league in his first season.

=== Club career statistics ===
Last Update 15 July 2012

Club performance			League		Cup		Continental		Total	
Season	Club	League	Apps	Goals	Apps	Goals	Apps	Goals	Apps	Goals
Iran			League		Hazfi Cup		Asia		Total	
2011–12	Sepahan	Persian Gulf Cup	1	0	0	0	0	0	1	0
Career total			1	0					1	0

== Honours ==
=== Club ===
Sepahan

- Iran Pro League (1):
  - 2011–12
