= Omid Vahdat Khorasan F.C. =

Iranian football club

- Full name: Omid Vahdat Khorasan Football Club
- Founded: 2022
- Chairman: Hamidreza Coupani
- Head Coach: Sirous Sangchouli
- League: Azadegan League

Omid Vahdat Football Club (Persian: باشگاه فوتبال امید وحدت) is an Iranian association football club based in Mashhad.This club announced its existence in the Azadegan League by buying the franchise of Shahr Khodro.
