= Farzad Hatami =

Iranian footballer (born 1986)

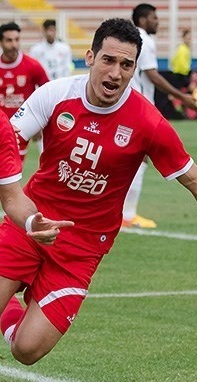

Personal information
- Full name: Farzad Jalal Hatami
- Date of birth: 3 January 1986 (age 40)
- Place of birth: Tehran, Iran
- Height: 1.92 m (6 ft 3 1/2 in)
- Position: Striker

Senior career*
Years	Team	Apps	(Gls)
2006–2007	Fajr Sepasi	12	(5)
2007–2008	Rah Ahan	29	(0)
2008–2009	Qäbälä	22	(8)
2009–2011	Sepahan	22	(3)
2010–2011	→ Saba (loan)	22	(6)
2011–2012	Tractor	30	(8)
2012–2013	Esteghlal	15	(6)
2013	Foolad	8	(2)
2013–2014	Persepolis	9	(1)
2014	Mes Kerman	6	(1)
2015–2016	Malavan	24	(7)
2016–2018	Tractor	53	(15)
2018–2019	Oxin Alborz	10	(2)
2019	Pars Jonoubi	13	(1)
2019–2020	Naft Masjed Soleyman	13	(1)
2020	Baadraan	8	(2)
2020–2021	Paykan	16	(3)
2021–2022	Saipa	8	(1)

International career^{‡}
2013	Iran	1	(0)
- * Club domestic league appearances and goals as of 01:23, 26 August 2018 (UTC) ‡ National team caps and goals as of 17:37, 18 June 2013 (UTC)

Farzad Hatami (Persian: فرزاد حاتمی; born 3 January 1986) is an Iranian professional footballer who plays for Paykan in the Persian Gulf Pro League.

Hatami has played for clubs including Esteghlal and Persepolis. He joined Oxin Alborz in August 2018. He joined Pars Jonoubi in January 2019, signing a contract until the end of the 2018–19 season.

== Club career ==
=== Club career statistics ===
As of 23 May 2018

Club performance			League		Cup		Continental		Total	
Season	Club	League	Apps	Goals	Apps	Goals	Apps	Goals	Apps	Goals
Iran			League		Hazfi Cup		Asia		Total	
2006–07	Fajr Sepasi	Iran Pro League	0	0	0	0	–	–	0	0
2007–08	Rah Ahan	Iran Pro League	29	0	0	0	–	–	29	0
Azerbaijan			League		Azerbaijan Cup		Europe		Total	
2008–09	Qäbälä	Azerbaijan Premier League	22	8	0	0	–	–	22	8
Iran			League		Hazfi Cup		Asia		Total	
2009–10	Sepahan	Iran Pro League	21	3	0	0	3	0	24	3
2010–11	Saba	Iran Pro League	22	6	0	0	–	–	22	6
2011–12	Sepahan	Iran Pro League	1	0	0	0	0	0	1	0
2011–12	Tractor	Iran Pro League	15	5	0	0	–	–	15	5
2012–13	Tractor	Iran Pro League	15	3	0	0	0	0	15	3
2012–13	Esteghlal	Iran Pro League	15	6	4	4	7	0	26	10
2013–14	Foolad	Iran Pro League	8	2	0	0	0	0	8	2
2013–14	Persepolis	Iran Pro League	9	1	0	0	–	–	9	1
2014–15	Mes Kerman	Azadegan League	6	1	0	0	–	–	6	1
2014–15	Malavan	Iran Pro League	12	6	0	0	0	0	12	6
2015–16	Malavan	Iran Pro League	12	1	1	0	0	0	13	1
2015–16	Tractor	Iran Pro League	13	4	0	0	8	3	21	7
2016–17	Tractor	Iran Pro League	26	7	6	3	0	0	32	10
2017-18	Tractor	Iran Pro League	23	4	3	1	4	1	30	6
Total	Iran		227	49	14	8	22	4	263	61
Total	Azerbaijan		22	8	0	0	–	–	22	8
Career total			249	57	14	8	22	4	285	69

- Assist Goals

Season	Team	Assists
10–11	Saba	3
11–12	Sepahan	0
11–12	Tractor	1
12–13	Tractor	2
12–13	Esteghlal	0
13–14	Foolad	0

== International career ==
He made his debut against Korea Republic on 18 June 2013 as a substitute where Iran qualified for the 2014 World Cup.

== Honours ==
=== Club ===
Sepahan

- Iran Pro League (1): 2009–10

Tractor

- Iran Pro League:
  - Runner-up (1): 2011–12

Esteghlal

- Iran Pro League (1): 2012–13

Persepolis

- Iran Pro League:
  - Runner-up (1): 2013–14
