= Milorad Janjuš =

Serbian footballer

Personal information
- Date of birth: 15 July 1982 (age 44)
- Place of birth: Novi Sad, SFR Yugoslavia
- Height: 1.91 m (6 ft 3 in)
- Position: Forward

Senior career*
Years	Team	Apps	(Gls)
2007–2009	FK Novi Sad	41	(12)
2008	→ Zlatibor Voda (loan)	15	(7)
2009–2010	Spartak Zlatibor Voda	17	(10)
2010	→ Pakhtakor Tashkent (loan)	14	(9)
2010–2012	Sepahan	36	(11)
2012	Shahrdari Tabriz	20	(9)
2013	Da Nang	23	(14)
2014	Sarawak FA	11	(7)
2015–2016	Proleter Novi Sad	10	(8)
2016–2017	Club Zefrol		
2018	Xagħra United		
2019-2020	Bečej 1918		
2021	AFK Ada		

Managerial career
- 2024: Bečej
- * Club domestic league appearances and goals

Milorad Janjuš (Serbian Cyrillic: Милорад Јањуш; born 15 July 1982) is a Serbian retired footballer who played as a striker. In 2024 he was manager of third League of Serbia club OFK Becej 1918.

== Playing career ==
=== Early career ===
Janjuš started his professional career at Novi Sad from 2007. In 2008, he left on loan to FK Spartak Zlatibor Voda. As part of the agreement, Zlatibor Voda have an option to sign him permanently at the end of the season 2010.

=== Spartak Zlatibor Voda ===
After an impressive season with Novi Sad, Janjuš transferred to Zlatibor Voda for the 2009–10 season. He scored first goal for the club on 5 December 2009, against FK Smederevo. After the 2009–10 season finished, he joined Pakhtakor on loan.

=== Pakhtakor Tashkent ===
In February 2010, Janjuš joined Uzbek League club Pakhtakor Tashkent on loan for an initial short period of month, which also under a contract of Zlatibor Voda. He made three appearances for the club, and returned to Zlatibor Voda on May when his contract expired.

=== Sepahan ===
From the 2010–12 season, Janjuš joined Iranian Sepahan. Janjuš won the Iran Professional League (IPL) title with Sepahan last season but fell out of favor with coach Zlatko Kranjčar in the current season. He made 36 appearances with scoring 11 goals in Iranian Pro League championship and getting more chance playing in AFC Champions League. After the 2012 season finished, he left the club moved to Shahrdari Tabriz.

=== Shahrdari Tabriz ===
On 5 January 2012, it was announced by Shahrdari Tabriz that the club had reached an agreement with Sepahan and Janjuš for his transfer, a deal was made him reunited with his former coach Amir Ghalenoei to join the club.

=== Đà Nẵng ===
In January 2013, Janjuš joined Vietnamese side SHB Đà Nẵng F.C on a one-year deal. He made his debut for SHB Đà Nẵng F.C against Kienlongbank Kiên Giang F.C. in the V League. Janjuš made nine further appearances with three goals for SHB Đà Nẵng F.C, both in V League, as the club won the Vietnamese Super Cup.

=== Sarawak FA ===
In December 2013, Janjuš have been trialed with Sarawak FA to fill foreign player quota after Sarawak already signed Iranian Alireza Abbasfard and Hungarian Gábor Gyepes who has previously played for Cardiff City. He made his debut for Sarawak on 18 January 2014 against ATM FA, however Sarawak FA defeated 2–0 to ATM in the first game of Malaysia Super League. On his FA Cup debut, he scored first goals against Penang FA that helped Sarawak F into Malaysia FA Cup second round.

== Honours ==
Sepahan

- Iran Pro League: 2010–2011

Đà Nẵng

- Vietnam Super League : Runner-up 2013 V.League 1
- Vietnamese Super Cup : 2013
- Vietnamese National Cup : Runner-up 2013 Vietnamese National Cup
