= Ibrahima Touré =

Senegalese footballer

Personal information
- Date of birth: 17 December 1985 (age 40)
- Place of birth: Dakar, Senegal
- Height: 1.88 m (6 ft 2 in)
- Position: Forward

Youth career
- 2005: Metz B

Senior career*
Years	Team	Apps	(Gls)
2005	Chengdu Wuniu	18	(2)
2005–2008	Wydad Casablanca		
2007–2008	→ Paykan (loan)	21	(13)
2008–2009	Persepolis	24	(11)
2009–2011	Sepahan	53	(36)
2011–2012	Ajman	10	(7)
2012–2013	Monaco	52	(28)
2013–2015	Al Nasr	43	(34)
2016–2017	Liaoning Whowin	10	(2)
2017–2018	Gazélec Ajaccio	16	(5)

International career
2012	Senegal	4	(0)
- * Club domestic league appearances and goals

Ibrahima Touré (born 17 December 1985) is a Senegalese former professional footballer who played as a forward for Chengdu Wuniu, Wydad Casablanca, Paykan, Persepolis, Sepahan, Ajman, Monaco, Al Nasr, Liaoning Whowin, and Gazélec Ajaccio. He made four appearances for the Senegal national team.

== Career ==
Born in Dakar, Touré played for the Academy Gentina Aldo during his youth. He spent one month with Metz during the 2004–05 season, an experience that he described as leaving "a bitter taste". In February 2005, as a part of a co-operation project between Metz and the Chengdu Football Association, Touré moved to China League One side Chengdu Wuniu on a free transfer. Wearing the number 10 shirt, he scored two goals in 18 league games during the 2005 season. Touré was also sent off twice.

After spending time in China, Touré joined Wydad Casablanca. Two years later, he joined Paykan on loan and scored 13 goals in 21 matches during the 2007–08 Iran Pro League campaign. Touré was transferred to Persepolis in 2008 and scored 11 league goals in his only season with the club. He moved to Sepahan in 2009 and helped the club win the Iran Pro League in successive seasons, scoring 18 goals in both campaigns. Touré was signed by United Arab Emirates club Ajman in 2011 and continued to score regularly. He had scored 14 goals in 16 league and cup matches by January 2012, which led to interest from other clubs. Touré joined Ligue 2 side Monaco later that month for an undisclosed fee, and scored ten goals in 17 league appearances during the second half of the 2011–12 season.

The following season, Touré played in 35 league games and scored 18 goals, which helped Monaco win the Ligue 2 championship and promotion back to Ligue 1.

On 14 August 2013, Touré signed for Al Nasr of the UAE Pro-League.

== Honours ==
Sepahan

- Iran Pro League: 2009–10, 2010–11

Monaco

- Ligue 2: 2012–13
