= Ahmad Jamshidian =

Iranian footballer

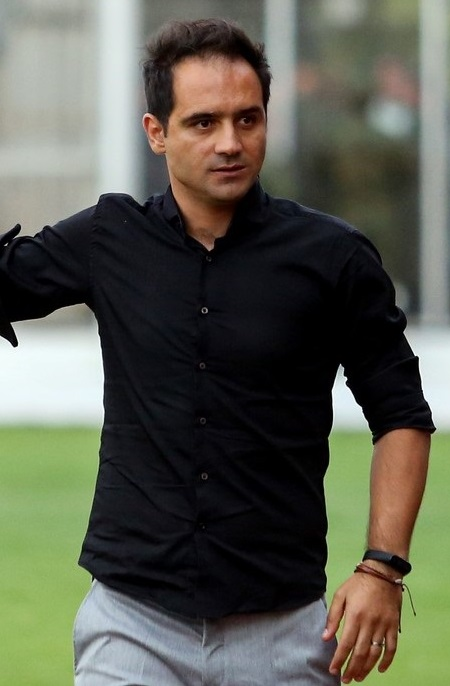

Personal information
- Date of birth: 16 May 1984 (age 42)
- Place of birth: Hamedan, Iran
- Height: 1.71 m (5 ft 7 in)
- Position: Midfielder

Youth career
- 2001–2002: Malavan

Senior career*
Years	Team	Apps	(Gls)
2002–2005	Malavan	21	(3)
2005–2008	Rah Ahan	82	(11)
2008–2013	Sepahan	115	(23)
2013–2014	Esteghlal	9	(0)
2014–2015	Paykan	11	(1)
2015–2016	Pas Hamedan	22	(0)
Total		260	(38)

International career
2004–2009	Iran	4	(0)

Managerial career
- 2018–2020: Pas Hamedan
- 2021: Shahrdari Astara
- 2022–2023: Shahrdari Hamedan
- 2024: Havadar (assistant)
- * Club domestic league appearances and goals

Ahmad Jamshidian (Persian: احمد جمشیدیان; born 16 May 1984) is an Iranian football coach and a former striker.

== Club career ==
He started to shine Rah Ahan and moved to Sepahan in summer 2008 and had a very good season in his first season. In June 2013, Jamshidian signed for Esteghlal and played his first match as a substitute for Pejman Nouri in 2–1 win over Gostaresh.

=== Club career statistics ===
As of 11 March 2014

Club performance			League		Cup		Continental		Total	
Season	Club	League	Apps	Goals	Apps	Goals	Apps	Goals	Apps	Goals
Iran			League		Hazfi Cup		Asia		Total	
2004–05	Malavan	Persian Gulf Cup	21	3			-	-	21	3
2005–06	Rah Ahan	Persian Gulf Cup	29	3			-	-	29	3
2006–07	Rah Ahan	Persian Gulf Cup	26	5			-	-	26	5
2007–08	Rah Ahan	Persian Gulf Cup	27	3			-	-	27	3
2008–09	Sepahan	Persian Gulf Cup	27	4	4	3	5	0	36	7
2009–10	Sepahan	Persian Gulf Cup	31	9			5	2	36	11
2010–11	Sepahan	Persian Gulf Cup	14	5	1	1	5	3	20	6
2011–12	Sepahan	Persian Gulf Cup	22	2	0	0	5	0	28	2
2012–13	Sepahan	Persian Gulf Cup	21	3	3	0	5	0	29	3
2013–14	Esteghlal	Persian Gulf Cup	9	0	0	0	5	0	14	0
Total	Career total		225	37	8	4	28	5	261	43

- Assist Goals

Season	Team	Assists
05–06	Rah Ahan	1
06–07	Rah Ahan	2
07–08	Rah Ahan	5
08–09	Sepahan	3
09–10	Sepahan	7
10–11	Sepahan	1
13–14	Esteghlal	1

== International career ==
He started his career in December 2008 against Ecuador.

== Honours ==
=== Club ===
Sepahan

- Iran Pro League (3): 2009–10, 2010–11, 2011–12
- Hazfi Cup (1): 2012–13
