= Mehdi Jafarpour =

Iranian footballer

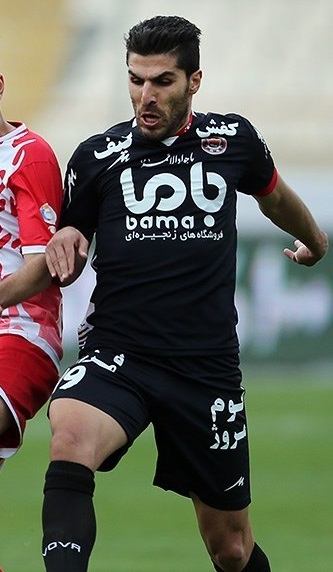

Personal information
- Full name: Mehdi Jafarpour Sorkhi
- Date of birth: 20 August 1984 (age 42)
- Place of birth: Ghaemshahr, Iran
- Height: 1.84 m (6 ft 0 in)
- Positions: Midfielder; right-back

Senior career*
Years	Team	Apps	(Gls)
2005–2013	Sepahan	119	(8)
2006–2008	→ PAS (loan)	25	(0)
2013–2014	Saipa	19	(1)
2014	Shahrdari Tabriz	1	(0)
2015	Persepolis	4	(0)
2015–2016	Rah Ahan	4	(0)
2016–2017	Siah Jamegan	9	(0)
2017–2018	Saba Qom	17	(1)
2018–2019	Sepahan Novin	18	(1)
- * Club domestic league appearances and goals

Mehdi Jafarpour Sorkhi (Persian: مهدی جعفرپور سرخی; born 20 August 1984) is an Iranian former footballer.

== Club career ==
Mehdi Jafarpour has scored important goals for Sepahan in the 2009–10 Iran Pro League season.

In Week 4, he scored in the 14th minute, which ended up being the winner against Esteghlal Ahvaz. The match ended 4-1 for Sepahan. In Week 9, He scored the equalizer against Saipa in the 41st minute, to counter Karim Ansarifard's first goal. The match ended Sepahan 2–2 Saipa.

=== Club career statistics ===
As of 26 May 2015.

Club performance			League		Cup		Continental		Total	
Season	Club	League	Apps	Goals	Apps	Goals	Apps	Goals	Apps	Goals
Iran			League		Hazfi Cup		Asia		Total	
2005–06	Sepahan	Pro League	16	1			-	-		
2006–07	PAS Tehran	Pro League	2	0			-	-		
2007–08	Pas Hamedan	Pro League	23	0	3	5	-	-	26	5
2008–09	Sepahan	Pro League	24	4		0	6	1		5
2009–10	Sepahan	Pro League	28	2			6	0		
2010–11	Sepahan	Pro League	17	0	1	0	3	0	8	0
2011–12	Sepahan	Pro League	20	1	0	0	5	0	26	1
2012–13	Sepahan	Pro League	14	0	1	0	3	0	18	0
2012–13	Saipa	Pro League	19	1	1	0	-	-	20	1
2014–15	Persepolis	Pro League	4	0	1	0	0	0	5	0
Career total			167	9			23	1		

- Assist Goals

Season	Team	Assists
08–09	Sepahan	1
09–10	Sepahan	1
10–11	Sepahan	0

== Honours ==
=== Club ===
- Iran's Premier Football League
  - Winner: 3
    - 2009/10 with Sepahan
    - 2010/11 with Sepahan
    - 2011/12 with Sepahan
- Hazfi Cup
  - Winner: 1
    - 2012/13 with Sepahan
