= Hassan Jafari =

Iranian footballer

Personal information
- Date of birth: 21 July 1990 (age 36)
- Place of birth: Nurabad, Iran
- Height: 1.69 m (5 ft 7 in)
- Position: Right back

Team information
- Current team: Mes Rafsanjan
- Number: 17

Youth career
- 2002–2007: Sepahan

Senior career*
Years	Team	Apps	(Gls)
2007–2013	Sepahan	51	(0)
2009–2011	→ Malavan (loan)	35	(0)
2013–2014	Foolad	13	(0)
2014–2015	Malavan	24	(0)
2015–2017	Padideh	36	(0)
2017–2019	Sepahan	38	(0)
2019	Nassaji	14	(1)
2020–2021	Shahr Khodro	25	(1)
2021–	Mes Rafsanjan	117	(2)

International career^{‡}
2008	Iran U19	1	(0)
- * Club domestic league appearances and goals as of 16 April 2025 ‡ National team caps and goals as of 4 November 2008

Hassan Jafari (Persian: حسن جعفری; born 21 July 1990) is an Iranian football midfielder who plays for Mes Rafsanjan in the Persian Gulf Pro League.

== Club career ==
Jafari Played his entire career for Sepahan except for two seasons at Malavan due to military services.

== Club career statistics ==
As of 16 May 2013

Club performance			League		Cup		Continental		Total	
Season	Club	League	Apps	Goals	Apps	Goals	Apps	Goals	Apps	Goals
Iran			League		Hazfi Cup		Asia		Total	
2007–08	Sepahan	Pro League	2	0	0	0	1	0	3	0
2008–09	Sepahan	Pro League	0	0	1	0	0	0	1	0
2009–10	Malavan	Pro League	10	0	2	0	-	-	12	0
2010–11	Malavan	Pro League	25	0	3	0	-	-	28	0
2011–12	Sepahan	Pro League	25	0	0	0	3	0	28	0
2012–13	Sepahan	Pro League	24	0	2	0	5	0	31	0
2013–14	Foolad	Pro League	13	0	0	0	0	0	13	0
2014–15	Malavan	Pro League	24	0	0	0	0	0	24	0
2015–16	Padideh	Pro League	0	0	0	0	0	0	0	0
2016–17	Padideh	Pro League	26	0	0	0	0	0	26	0
2017–18	Sepahan	Pro League	12	0	1	0	0	0	13	0
2018–19	Sepahan	Pro League	14	0	1	0	0	0	15	0
Career total			112	0	10	0	9	0	131	0

== Honours ==
Malavan

- Hazfi Cup: 2010–11 (Runner-up)

Sepahan

- Iran Pro League: 2011–12
- Hazfi Cup: 2012–13

Foolad

- Iran Pro League: 2013–14
