= Mehdi Karimian =

Iranian footballer (born 1980)

Personal information
- Full name: Mehdi Karimian
- Date of birth: 28 August 1980 (age 46)
- Place of birth: Bushehr, Iran
- Height: 1.70 m (5 ft 7 in)
- Position: Midfielder

Youth career
- 2001–2004: Shahin Bushehr

Senior career*
Years	Team	Apps	(Gls)
2004–2006	Zob Ahan	30	(2)
2006–2009	Bargh Shiraz	85	(14)
2009–2012	Sepahan	75	(6)
2012–2014	Tractor	40	(3)
2014	Esteghlal	9	(1)
2015–2017	Fajr Sepasi	11	(0)
Total		250	(26)
- * Club domestic league appearances and goals as of 8 August 2014 ‡ National team caps and goals as of 27 April 2010

Mehdi Karimian (born August 28, 1980) is a retired Iranian footballer who last played for Fajr Sepasi in the Iran Pro League.

== Club career ==
Karimian joined Sepahan in 2009 after spending the previous three seasons at Bargh Shiraz.

=== Club career statistics ===
As of 8 August 2014

Club performance			League		Cup		Continental		Total	
Season	Club	League	Apps	Goals	Apps	Goals	Apps	Goals	Apps	Goals
Iran			League		Hazfi Cup		Asia		Total	
2004–05	Zob Ahan	Iran Pro League	15	2			-	-		
2005–06	Zob Ahan	Iran Pro League	15	0			-	-		
2006–07	Bargh	Iran Pro League	27	1			-	-		
2007–08	Bargh	Iran Pro League	32	8	3	0	-	-	35	8
2008–09	Bargh	Iran Pro League	26	5			-	-		
2009–10	Sepahan	Iran Pro League	32	1			6	0		
2010–11	Sepahan	Iran Pro League	16	1	2	1	6	0	24	2
2011–12	Sepahan	Iran Pro League	27	4	1	0	6	0	34	4
2012–13	Tractor	Iran Pro League	23	1	2	0	4	0	29	1
2013–14	Tractor	Iran Pro League	17	2						
2014–15	Esteghlal	Iran Pro League	9	1	2	0	-	-	11	1
Total	Iran		228	26			22	0		

- Assist Goals

Season	Team	Assists
09–10	Sepahan	8
10–11	Sepahan	1
11–12	Sepahan	4
12–13	Tractor	2
13–14	Tractor	
14–15	Esteghlal	

== Personal ==
Karimian is the brother of Moghavemat Sepasi midfielder Mehrdad Karimian.

== Honours ==
=== Club ===
Sepahan

- Iran Pro League (3): 2009–10, 2010–11, 2011–12

Tractor

- Hazfi Cup (1): 2013–14
