= 2012–13 Sepahan F.C. season =

Sepahan
2012–13 season
- Chairman: Alireza Rahimi
- Manager: (Croatia) Zlatko Kranjčar
- Stadium: Foolad Shahr Stadium
- Iran Pro League: 3rd
- Hazfi Cup: Champions
- AFC Champions League: Group Stage
- Top goalscorer: League: Mohammad Reza Khalatbari (13); All: Mohammad Reza Khalatbari (16); Xhevahir Sukaj (16)
- Highest home attendance: 9,280 vs Al Ahli (AFC Champions League, 19 September 2012)
- Lowest home attendance: 1,000 vs Gahar (Iran Pro League, 22 November 2012)
- Average home league attendance: 3,643
Home colours	Away colours	Third colours

The 2012–13 season was Sepahan's 12th season in the Pro League, and their 19th consecutive season in the top division of Iranian Football and 60th year in existence as a football club. They also competed in the Hazfi Cup and AFC Champions League. Sepahan was captained by Moharram Navidkia.

== Player ==
=== First team squad ===
Last updated on 11 May 2013

Under-23 players	Under-21 players	Under-19 players

Out during the season (transferred, injured, or released)

No.	Name	Nationality	Position(s)	Since	Date of Birth (Age)	Signed from	Appearance(s)	Goal(s)
Goalkeepers
1	Mohammad Bagher Sadeghi	(Iran)	GK	2012	1 April 1989 (age 37)	Zob Ahan	11	0
27	Mehdi Amini	(Iran)	GK	2012	27 March 1996 (age 30)	(Youth system)	0	0
30	Mohammad Nasseri	(Iran)	GK	2011	16 May 1993 (age 33)	(Youth system)	0	0
35	Shahab Gordan	(Iran)	GK	2013	22 May 1984 (age 42)	Persepolis	17	0
36	Mohammad Mahmoudvand	(Iran)	GK	2013	2 March 1985 (age 41)	Aboumoslem	0	0
Defenders
3	Farshid Talebi	(Iran)	CB	2012	24 August 1981 (age 45)	Zob Ahan	29	3
5	Mohammad Ali Ahmadi	(Iran)	CB	2012	24 June 1983 (age 43)	Zob Ahan	28	0
6	Milan Susak	(Australia)	CB, RB	2012	29 January 1984 (age 42)	(China) Tianjin Teda	11	0
11	Mohsen Irannejad	(Iran)	LB, LWB	2012	15 July 1985 (age 41)	Shahin Bushehr	15	0
17	Abolhassan Jafari	(Iran)	RB, RWB	2007	21 July 1990 (age 36)	(Youth system), Malavan	51	0
18	Mohammad Hossein Moradmand	(Iran)	CB	2012	22 June 1993 (age 33)	(Youth system)	2	0
28	Ehsan Hajsafi	(Iran)	LB, LWB	2006	25 February 1990 (age 36)	(Youth system), Tractor Sazi	143	22
38	Ervin Bulku	(Albania)	RB, DM, RM	2012	3 March 1981 (age 45)	(Azerbaijan) AZAL Baku	21	1
Midfielders
4	Moharram Navidkia (captain)	(Iran)	AM	1998	1 November 1982 (age 43)	(Youth system), (Germany) VfL Bochum	253	40
9	Mehdi Jafarpour	(Iran)	RM, RB	2005	20 August 1984 (age 42)	(Youth system), PAS Hamedan	119	8
10	Hossein Papi	(Iran)	LM, RM	2004	27 February 1985 (age 41)	(Youth system), Sepahan Novin	116	1
12	Ali Karimi	(Iran)	CM	2012	11 February 1994 (age 32)	(Youth system)	0	0
15	Omid Ebrahimi	(Iran)	DM	2010	16 September 1987 (age 39)	Sh. Bandar Abbas	82	14
20	Ahmad Jamshidian	(Iran)	AM, RM	2008	16 May 1984 (age 42)	Rah Ahan	115	20
23	Amin Jahan Alian	(Iran)	RM, AM	2012	16 June 1991 (age 35)	(Youth system)	18	3
24	Akbar Imani	(Iran)	CM	2010	21 March 1992 (age 34)	(Youth system)	6	0
32	Hamid Reza Kazemi	(Iran)	CM, AM	2011	25 May 1992 (age 34)	(Youth system)	1	0
Forwards
8	Mohammad Gholami	(Iran)	CF	2012	13 February 1983 (age 43)	Damash	25	0
14	Xhevahir Sukaj	(Albania)	CF	2012	5 October 1987 (age 39)	(Turkey) Gençlerbirliği	42	13
21	Radomir Đalović	(Montenegro)	CF	2012	29 October 1982 (age 43)	(Russia) FC Amkar Perm	26	4
25	Mehdi Sharifi	(Iran)	CF	2012	16 August 1992 (age 34)	(Youth system)	0	0
26	Ali Choupani	(Iran)	CF	2012	26 April 1993 (age 33)	(Youth system)	0	0
33	Mohammad Reza Khalatbari	(Iran)	CF, SS	2012	14 September 1983 (age 43)	(United Arab Emirates) Al Wasl FC	32	13

No.	Name	Nationality	Position(s)	Since	Date of birth (age)	Signed from	Appearance(s)	Goal(s)
22	Reza Mohamadi	(Iran)	GK	2011	14 June 1985 (age 41)	Iranjavan	8	0
2	Hassan Ashjari	(Iran)	LB, LWB	2011	1 August 1979 (age 47)	Steel Azin	38	1
6	Hadi Tamini	(Iran)	CB, SW	2011	23 August 1981 (age 45)	Malavan	27	2
7	Milad Zeneyedpour	(Iran)	LM, RM	2012	21 March 1986 (age 40)	Damash	6	0
40	Adel Kolahkaj	(Iran)	CM, LM	2012	21 February 1985 (age 41)	Mes Kerman	8	1

For more on the reserve and academy squads, see Sepahan Novin.

=== Iran Pro League squad ===
Updated 19 January 2013.

Note: Flags indicate national team as defined under FIFA eligibility rules; some limited exceptions apply. Players may hold more than one non-FIFA nationality.

No.	Pos.	Nation	Player
1	GK	IRI	Mohammad-Bagher Sadeghi
3	DF	IRI	Farshid Talebi
4	MF	IRI	Moharram Navidkia (captain)
5	DF	IRI	Mohammad-Ali Ahmadi
6	DF	AUS	Milan Susak
8	FW	IRI	Mohammad Gholami
9	MF	IRI	Mehdi Jafarpour
10	MF	IRI	Hossein Papi (3rd vice-captain)
11	DF	IRI	Mohsen Irannejad
12	MF	IRI	Ali Karimi
14	FW	ALB	Xhevahir Sukaj
15	MF	IRI	Omid Ebrahimi (2nd vice-captain)
17	DF	IRI	Abolhassan Jafari
18	DF	IRI	Mohammad Hossein Moradmand

No.	Pos.	Nation	Player
20	MF	IRI	Ahmad Jamshidian (1st vice-captain)
21	FW	MNE	Radomir Đalović
23	MF	IRI	Amin Jahan Alian
24	MF	IRI	Akbar Imani
25	FW	IRI	Mehdi Sharifi
26	FW	IRI	Ali Choopani
27	GK	IRI	Mehdi Amini
28	DF	IRI	Ehsan Hajsafi
30	GK	IRI	Mohammad Nasseri
32	MF	IRI	Hamid Reza Kazemi
33	FW	IRI	Mohammad Reza Khalatbari
35	GK	IRI	Shahab Gordan
36	GK	IRI	Mohammad Mahmoudvand
38	DF	ALB	Ervin Bulku

For recent transfers, see List of Iranian football transfers winter 2012–13.

== Transfers ==
Confirmed transfers 2012–13

=== Summer ===
In: Note: Flags indicate national team as defined under FIFA eligibility rules; some limited exceptions apply. Players may hold more than one non-FIFA nationality.

No.	Pos.	Nation	Player
1	GK	IRI	Mohammad Bagher Sadeghi (from Zob Ahan)
3	DF	IRI	Farshid Talebi (from Zob Ahan)
5	DF	IRI	Mohammad Ali Ahmadi (from Zob Ahan)
7	MF	IRI	Milad Zeneyedpour (from Damash Gilan)
8	FW	IRI	Mohammad Gholami (from Damash Gilan)
11	DF	IRI	Mohsen Irannejad (from Shahin Bushehr)
12	MF	IRI	Ali Karimi (from Sepahan Youth)
18	DF	IRI	Mohammad Hossein Moradmand (from Sepahan Youth)
21	FW	MNE	Radomir Đalović (from (Russia) Amkar Perm)
23	MF	IRI	Amin Jahan Alian (from Sepahan Youth)
25	FW	IRI	Mehdi Sharifi (from Sepahan Youth)
26	FW	IRI	Ali Choupani (from Sepahan Youth)
27	GK	IRI	Mehdi Amini (from Sepahan Youth)
33	FW	IRI	Mohammad Reza Khalatbari (from (United Arab Emirates) Al Wasl FC)
38	DF	ALB	Ervin Bulku (from (Azerbaijan) AZAL Baku)
40	MF	IRI	Adel Kolahkaj (from Mes Kerman)

Out: Note: Flags indicate national team as defined under FIFA eligibility rules; some limited exceptions apply. Players may hold more than one non-FIFA nationality.

No.	Pos.	Nation	Player
1	GK	IRI	Rahman Ahmadi (to Saipa)
6	DF	IRI	Jalal Hosseini (to Persepolis)
7	FW	IRQ	Emad Mohammed Ridha (to)
8	DF	IRI	Mohsen Bengar (to Persepolis)
11	MF	IRI	Mehdi Karimian (to Tractor Sazi)
16	DF	IRI	Hashem Beikzadeh (to Esteghlal)
18	MF	IRI	Reza Nasehi (to Aluminium Hormozgan)
19	FW	BRA	Bruno Correa (to (United Arab Emirates) Al Nasr)
21	DF	IRI	Mehdi Nasiri (to Shahin Bushehr)
23	FW	IRI	Mehdi Seyed-Salehi (to Tractor Sazi)
25	DF	IRI	Iman Kiani (Released)
26	DF	IRI	Saeed Lotfi (Released)
27	GK	IRI	Hadi Rishesfahani (to Esteghlal)
31	FW	IRI	Sardar Azmoun (to (Russia) Rubin Kazan)
37	MF	BRA	Fabio Januario (to Esteghlal)

=== Winter ===
In: Note: Flags indicate national team as defined under FIFA eligibility rules; some limited exceptions apply. Players may hold more than one non-FIFA nationality.

No.	Pos.	Nation	Player
6	DF	AUS	Milan Susak (from (China) Tianjin Teda)
28	DF	IRI	Ehsan Hajsafi (loan return from Tractor Sazi)
35	GK	IRI	Shahab Gordan (from Persepolis)
36	GK	IRI	Mohammad Mahmoudvand (from Free Agent)

Out: Note: Flags indicate national team as defined under FIFA eligibility rules; some limited exceptions apply. Players may hold more than one non-FIFA nationality.

No.	Pos.	Nation	Player
2	DF	IRI	Hassan Ashjari (to Esteghlal)
6	DF	IRI	Hadi Tamini (to Malavan)
7	MF	IRI	Milad Zeneyedpour (to Paykan)
22	GK	IRI	Reza Mohammadi (to Persepolis)
40	MF	IRI	Adel Kolahkaj (to Persepolis)

== Competitions ==
=== Overview ===
Competition	Started round	Current position / round	Final position / round	First match	Last match
2012–13 Iran Pro League	—	—	3rd	20 July 2012	10 May 2013
2012–13 Hazfi Cup	Round of 32	—	Winner	13 December 2012	5 May 2013
AFC Champions League	Quarter-finals	—	Quarter-finals	19 September 2012	2 October 2012
AFC Champions League	Group stage	—	Group stage	27 February 2013	30 April 2013

Updated to match played 24 April 2013
Source: Competitions

=== Iran Pro League ===
==== Standings ====
Pos	Team	Pld	W	D	L	GF	GA	GD	Pts	Qualification or relegation
1	Esteghlal (C)	34	19	10	5	42	18	+24	67	Qualification for the 2014 AFC Champions League group stage
2	Tractor Sazi	34	18	11	5	55	32	+23	65	Qualification for the 2014 AFC Champions League group stage
3	Sepahan	34	19	7	8	64	33	+31	64	Qualification for the 2014 AFC Champions League group stage
4	Foolad	34	14	14	6	52	35	+17	56	Qualification for the 2014 AFC Champions League group stage
5	Naft Tehran	34	14	13	7	42	29	+13	55	

Updated to match(es) played on 10 May 2013. Source: IPL stats.com
Rules for classification: 1) points; 2) goal difference; 3) number of goals scored.
(C) Champions

==== Results summary ====
Overall								Home						Away					
Pld	W	D	L	GF	GA	GD	Pts	W	D	L	GF	GA	GD	W	D	L	GF	GA	GD
34	19	7	8	60	33	+27	64	11	2	4	31	18	+13	8	5	4	29	15	+14

Last updated: 11 May 2013.
Source: Ipl Stats

==== Results by round ====
Round	1	2	3	4	5	6	7	8	9	10	11	12	13	14	15	16	17	18	19	20	21	22	23	24	25	26	27	28	29	30	31	32	33	34
Ground	H	A	H	A	H	A	H	A	H	A	H	A	H	A	H	H	A	A	H	A	H	A	H	A	H	A	H	A	H	A	H	A	A	H
Result	W	W	D	W	L	L	W	D	W	W	W	D	L	W	L	W	D	L	L	W	W	W	W	D	W	L	W	W	W	W	W	D	L	D
Position	6	3	2	1	3	7	2	3	2	1	1	1	5	4	2	2	1	2	4	4	4	4	4	4	2	3	3	3	2	2	2	2	2	3

Updated to match(es) played on 11 May 2013. Source: "Ipl".
A = Away; H = Home; W = Win; D = Draw; L = Loss

==== Matches ====
Win Draw Loss Postponed

Date Round	Home	Score	Away	Location

20 July 2012 1	Sepahan	1–0	Mes Kerman	Fooladshahr
20:45 UTC+04:30	Tamini 47'	Report	Bates (yellow card); Enayati (yellow card)	Stadium: Fooladshahr Stadium; Attendance: 4,000; Referee: Shahin Haji Babaei

25 July 2012 2	Foolad	1–3	Sepahan	Ahvaz
22:00 UTC+04:30	Sharifat 42'; Nouri (yellow card); Amirabadi (yellow card)	Report	Đalović 19'; Ebrahimi 38'; Sukaj 74'; Zeneyedpour (yellow card); Talebi (yellow card); Kolahkaj (yellow card); Jafari (yellow card)	Stadium: Takhti Stadium; Attendance: 7,000; Referee: Mohsen Torki

31 July 2012 3	Sepahan	2–2	Rah Ahan	Fooladshahr
22:00 UTC+04:30	Đalović 33'; Karimi 81' (o.g.); Tamini (yellow card); Talebi (yellow card); Ahmadi (yellow card); Jafari (yellow card)	Report	Shiri 11' 67'; Abbasfard (yellow card)	Stadium: Fooladshahr Stadium; Attendance: 3,000; Referee: Hassan Zargar

6 August 2012 4	Zob Ahan	0–4	Sepahan	Fooladshahr
22:00 UTC+04:30	Sadeghian (yellow card); Salsali (yellow card); Mosalman (yellow card); Ashouri (yellow card)	Report	Tamini 17'; Đalović 48'; Navidkia 51'; Jamshidian 89'; Khalatbari (yellow card); Ashjari (yellow card); Tamini (yellow card); Kolahkaj (yellow card); Ahmadi (yellow card) (yellow-red card)	Stadium: Fooladshahr Stadium; Attendance: 4,000; Referee: Saeed Bakhshizadeh

18 August 2012 5	Sepahan	0–2	Saipa	Fooladshahr
22:00 UTC+04:30	Talebi (red card)	Report	Shahbazzadeh 28'; Gharibi 93'; Márcio (yellow card)	Stadium: Fooladshahr Stadium; Attendance: 5,500; Referee: Mohsen Torki

23 August 2012 6	Paykan	1–0	Sepahan	Tehran
19:00 UTC+04:30	Mobali 94'	Report	Ahmadi (yellow card); Kolahkaj (yellow card)	Stadium: Shahid Dastgerdi Stadium; Attendance: 600; Referee: Mohammad Reza Akbarian

29 August 2012 7	Sepahan	1–0	Fajr Sepasi	Fooladshahr
19:00 UTC+04:30	Khalatbari (yellow card); Sukaj 85'	Report	Joukar (yellow card); Shafiei (yellow card); Nazari (yellow card)	Stadium: Fooladshahr Stadium; Attendance: 5,000; Referee: Touraj Haghverdi

14 September 2012 8	Sanat Naft	1–1	Sepahan	Abadan
19:45 UTC+04:30	Khaleghifar 21'	Report	Sukaj 58'; Sukaj (yellow card)	Stadium: Takhti Stadium; Attendance: 7,000; Referee: Yadollah Jahanbazi

23 September 2012 9	Sepahan	2–0	Persepolis	Fooladshahr
18:30 UTC+03:30	Kolahkaj 51'; Sukaj 72'; Đalović (yellow card); Khalatbari (yellow card)	Report	Kazemian (yellow card); Norouzi (yellow card); Madanchi (yellow card)	Stadium: Fooladshahr Stadium; Attendance: 7,000; Referee: Saeed Mozafarizadeh

27 September 2012 10	Malavan	0–2	Sepahan	Bandar-e Anzali
17:25 UTC+03:30		Report	Sukaj 45'; Đalović 67'; Sukaj (yellow card); Jafarpour (yellow card); Ebrahimi (yellow card); Navidkia (yellow card); Đalović (yellow card)	Stadium: Takhti Stadium; Attendance: 7,000; Referee: Touraj Haghverdi

1 October 2012 11	Sepahan	v	Gahar	Fooladshahr
				Stadium: Fooladshahr Stadium

19 October 2012 12	Saba	1–1	Sepahan	Qom
16:50 UTC+03:30	Soleiman Fallah 93'; Momeni (yellow card); Badrlou (yellow card)	Report	Ebrahimi 91'; Jahan Alian (yellow card); Talebi (yellow card); Jafarpour (yellow card)	Stadium: Yadegar-e Emam Stadium; Attendance: 4,000; Referee: Mohsen Ghahremani

25 October 2012 13	Sepahan	1–4	Tractor Sazi	Fooladshahr
16:00 UTC+03:30	Ebrahimi 55'; Jafari (yellow card); Ebrahimi (yellow card)	Report	Seyed-Salehi 15'; Seyed-Salehi 52'; Lopez 58' (pen.); Ashjari 91' (o.g.); Dehnavi (yellow card)	Stadium: Fooladshahr Stadium; Attendance: 4,000; Referee: Mohsen Torki

30 October 2012 14	Naft Tehran	3–4	Sepahan	Tehran
15:30 UTC+03:30	Shakouri 7' (pen.); Ljubojević 15'; Ljubojević 58'; Shakouri (yellow card); Batista (yellow card) (yellow-red card)	Report	Sukaj 37'; Ebrahimi 77' (pen.); Khalatbari 80'; Ebrahimi 90'; Khalatbari (yellow card); Bulku (yellow card)	Stadium: Shahid Dastgerdi Stadium; Attendance: 600; Referee: Alireza Faghani

18 November 2012 15	Sepahan	0–1	Esteghlal	Fooladshahr
15:15 UTC+03:30	Khalatbari (yellow card); Ahmadi (yellow card)	Report	Heidari 15'; Sadeghi (yellow card); Borhani (yellow card); Nekounam (red card)	Stadium: Fooladshahr Stadium; Attendance: 6,000; Referee: Saeed Mozafarizadeh

22 November 2012 11	Sepahan	2–1	Gahar	Fooladshahr
15:15 UTC+03:30	Talebi 37'; Khalatbari 89'; Talebi (yellow card); Bulku (yellow card); Jafari (yellow card); Moradmand (yellow card) (yellow-red card)	Report	Torkashvand 34'; Shafiei (yellow card); Kardoost (yellow card); Ghasemi (red card)	Stadium: Fooladshahr Stadium; Attendance: 1,000; Referee: Rahim Mehrpisheh

28 November 2012 16	Sepahan	3–0	Damash	Fooladshahr
15:15 UTC+03:30	Khalatbari 50', 83'; Navidkia 65'	Report	Roudbarian (yellow card); Mokhtari (red card)	Stadium: Fooladshahr Stadium; Attendance: 1,000; Referee: Mohammad Seyedali

3 December 2012 17	Aluminium	1–1	Sepahan	Bandar Abbas
15:15 UTC+03:30	Pirzadeh 52'; Mohammadzadeh (yellow card); Abarghouei (yellow card); Dadashvand (yellow card); Khavarpoor (yellow card)	Report	Khalatbari 24'; Talebi (yellow card); Ahmadi (yellow card)	Stadium: Khalij Fars Stadium; Attendance: 8,000; Referee: Mohammad Reza Akbarian

25 December 2012 18	Mes Kerman	1–0	Sepahan	Kerman
15:00 UTC+03:30	Enayati 18'; Nazarzadeh (yellow card)	Report	Jafari (yellow card)	Stadium: Shahid Bahonar Stadium; Attendance: 5,000; Referee: Yadollah Jahanbazi

30 December 2013 19	Sepahan	0–1	Foolad	Fooladshahr
15:00 UTC+03:30	Dalovic (yellow card)	Report	Pereira 71'; Sharifat (yellow card); Pereira (yellow card); Jamaati (yellow card)	Stadium: Fooladshahr Stadium; Attendance: 2,000; Referee: Mohsen Torki

4 January 2013 20	Rah Ahan	v	Sepahan	Tehran
				Stadium: Rah Ahan Stadium

13 January 2013 21	Sepahan	4–3	Zob Ahan	Fooladshahr
15:30 UTC+03:30	Sukaj 6'; Sukaj 14'; Ebrahimi 32' (pen.); Navidkia 89' (pen.); Jafari (red card)	Report	Rajabzadeh 29'; Rajabzadeh 55' (pen.); Pahlevan 77'; Kasparov (red card)	Stadium: Fooladshahr Stadium; Attendance: 3,000; Referee: Mohsen Ghahremani

18 January 2013 22	Saipa	0–3	Sepahan	Tehran
15:30 UTC+03:30	Narciso (yellow card)	Report	Khalatbari 45'; Jahan Alian 59'; Hajsafi 76'; Hajsafi (yellow card)	Stadium: Enghelab Stadium; Attendance: 1,000; Referee: Alborz Hajipour

24 January 2013 23	Sepahan	2–0	Paykan	Fooladshahr
15:30 UTC+03:30	Navidkia 63'; Khalatbari 89'; Bulku (yellow card)	Report		Stadium: Fooladshahr Stadium; Attendance: 1,500; Referee: Mohammad Reza Akbarian

29 January 2013 24	Fajr Sepasi	0–0	Sepahan	Shiraz
15:00 UTC+03:30	Afand (yellow card); Ghezalchi (yellow card); Ansari (yellow card); Hossaini (yellow card); Alimohamadi (yellow card)	Report	Khalatbari (yellow card)	Stadium: Hafezieh Stadium; Attendance: 5,000; Referee: Alireza Faghani

8 February 2013 25	Sepahan	3–0	Sanat Naft	Fooladshahr
15:30 UTC+03:30	Jahan Alian 21'; Navidkia 43'; Navidkia 53'; Ebrahimi (yellow card)	Report	Moshkelpour (yellow card); Barzaei (yellow card)	Stadium: Fooladshahr Stadium; Attendance: 5,000; Referee: Hassan Zargar

12 February 2013 20	Rah Ahan	0–1	Sepahan	Tehran
15:30 UTC+03:30	Kafshgari (yellow card); Shiri (yellow card); Karimi (yellow card)	Report	Sukaj 81'; Susak (yellow card); Ahmadi (yellow card); Bulku (yellow card); Irannejad (yellow card)	Stadium: Rah Ahan Stadium; Attendance: 1,500; Referee: Saeed Mozafarizadeh

17 February 2013 26	Persepolis	1–0	Sepahan	Tehran
17:15 UTC+03:30	Norouzi 92'; Naghizadeh (yellow card); Pouladi (yellow card)	Report	Talebi (yellow card); Sukaj (yellow card); Ebrahimi (yellow card); Gordan (yellow card); Susak (yellow card) (yellow-red card)	Stadium: Azadi Stadium; Attendance: 20,000; Referee: Touraj Haghverdi

21 February 2013 27	Sepahan	3–1	Malavan	Fooladshahr
16:00 UTC+03:30	Hajsafi 26'; Jamshidian 76'; Ebrahimi 83'	Report	Heidari 89'	Stadium: Fooladshahr Stadium; Attendance: 3,000; Referee: Mohsen Ghahremani

4 March 2013 28	Gahar	1–4	Sepahan	Dorood
15:30 UTC+03:30	Nikkar 92'; Torkashvand (yellow card); Khorsandnia (yellow card)	Report	Sukaj 9'; Khalatbari 45'; Talebi 49'; Jamshidian 71'; Ebrahimi (yellow card)	Stadium: Dorood Stadium; Attendance: 3,000; Referee: Mohammad Hossein Assadi

8 March 2013 29	Sepahan	2–0	Saba	Fooladshahr
16:00 UTC+03:30	Jahan Alian 24'; Sukaj 73'; Ahmadi (yellow card)	Report	Kashi (yellow card); Eslami (yellow card); Rezaïan (yellow card)	Stadium: Fooladshahr Stadium; Attendance: 3,000; Referee: Hossein Zargar

18 March 2013 30	Tractor Sazi	1–3	Sepahan	Tabriz
15:30 UTC+03:30	Soares 86'; Nosrati (yellow card); Karimian (yellow card)	Report	Khalatbari 15'; Talebi 28'; Navidkia 53'; Susak (yellow card)	Stadium: Yadegar-e Emam Stadium; Attendance: 30,000; Referee: Alireza Faghani

6 April 2013 31	Sepahan	3–1	Naft Tehran	Fooladshahr
17:30 UTC+03:30	Bulku 12'; Khalatbari 45'; Ebrahimi 89' (pen.); Bulku (yellow card) (yellow-red card)	Report	Manouchehri 53'; Hamdinejad (yellow card); Kamel (red card)	Stadium: Fooladshahr Stadium; Attendance: 3,000; Referee: Mohsen Ghahremani

15 April 2013 32	Esteghlal	1–1	Sepahan	Tehran
19:00 UTC+03:30	Irannejad 93' (o.g.); Sadeghi (yellow card); Mousavi (yellow card) (yellow-red card)	Report	Navidkia 66'; Khalatbari (yellow card); Talebi (yellow card) (yellow-red card)	Stadium: Azadi Stadium; Attendance: 70,000; Referee: Saeed Mozafarizadeh

19 April 2013 33	Damash	2–1	Sepahan	Rasht
17:30 UTC+03:30	Hajati 21'; Motevaselzadeh 40'; Kébé (yellow card); Mokhtari (yellow card) (yellow-red card)	Report	Khalatbari 93'; Ebrahimi (yellow card); Hajsafi (yellow card); Bulku (yellow card)	Stadium: Shahid Dr. Azodi Stadium; Attendance: 15,000; Referee: Touraj Haghverdi

10 May 2013 34	Sepahan	2–2	Aluminium	Fooladshahr
18:00 UTC+03:30	Khalatbari 28', 55' (pen.); Hajsafi (red card)	Report	Meydavoudi 18'; Shokouh Magham 41'; Roshangar (yellow card); Abarghouei (yellow card)	Stadium: Fooladshahr Stadium; Attendance: 6000; Referee: Mohsen Ghahremani

=== Hazfi Cup ===
==== Matches ====
Win Draw Loss Postponed

Date Round	Home	Score	Away	Location

13 December 2012 1/16	Sepahan	2–1	Foolad	Fooladshahr
16:15 UTC+03:30	Gholami 9'; Khalatbari 85'	Report	Pereira 60'; Khaledi (yellow card)	Stadium: Fooladshahr Stadium; Attendance: 2,000; Referee: Mohsen Ghahremani

20 December 2012 1/8	Mes Rafsanjan	0–1 (a.e.t.)	Sepahan	Rafsanjan
14:00 UTC+03:30	Kavianifar (yellow card); Abedi (yellow card); Mahmoudi (yellow card); Jafari (yellow card)	Report	Sukaj 109'; Ahmadi (yellow card); Sadeghi (yellow card)	Stadium: Takhti Rafsanjan Stadium; Attendance: 3,000; Referee: Seyed Mehdi Seyed-Ali

9 January 2013 1/4	Sepahan	2–0	Sanat Naft	Fooladshahr
14:30 UTC+03:30	Bulku 27'; Talebi 61'	Report	Ramezani (yellow card); Navidkia (yellow card)	Stadium: Fooladshahr Stadium; Attendance: 1,500; Referee: Alireza Faghani

30 March 2013 1/2	Esteghlal	1–1 (a.e.t.) (4–5 p)	Sepahan	Tehran
17:00 UTC+03:30	Hatami 64'; Borhani (yellow card); Majidi (yellow card); Nekounam (yellow card); Heidari (yellow card) (yellow-red card)	Report	Khalatbari 42' (yellow card); Bulku (yellow card); Talebi (red card)	Stadium: Azadi Stadium; Attendance: 65,000; Referee: Alireza Faghani
	Penalties
	(penalty scored) Jabbari; (penalty scored) Samuel; (penalty scored) Mohammadrezaei; (penalty missed) Sadeghi; (penalty scored) Nekounam; (penalty missed) Rahmati; (penalty missed) Hatami		(penalty scored) Bulku; (penalty scored) Ebrahimi; (penalty scored) Khalatbari; (penalty scored) Hajsafi; (penalty missed) Jamshidian; (penalty missed) Irannejad; (penalty scored) Susak

5 May 2013 Final	Persepolis	2–2 (a.e.t.) (2–4 p)	Sepahan	Tehran
18:00 UTC+03:30	Ansarifard 24'; Nouri 99'; Haghighi (yellow card); Nouri (yellow card); Mahini (yellow card)	Report	Sukaj 59'; Gholami 106'; Khalatbari (yellow card); Ebrahimi (yellow card)	Stadium: Azadi Stadium; Attendance: 97,452; Referee: Alireza Faghani
	Penalties
	(penalty missed) Norouzi; (penalty scored) Mahini; (penalty missed) Haghighi; (penalty scored) Naghizadeh		(penalty scored) Bulku; (penalty scored) Khalatbari; (penalty scored) Ebrahimi; (penalty scored) Hajsafi

==== AFC Champions League 2012 ====
===== Quarter-finals =====
Win Draw Loss Postponed

Date Round	Home	Score	Away	Location

19 September 2012 1st Leg	Sepahan	0–0	(Saudi Arabia) Al-Ahli	Fooladshahr, Iran
20:30 UTC+04:30	Navidkia (yellow card)	Report	Al-Musa (yellow card); Bakshwin (yellow card)	Stadium: Fooladshahr Stadium; Attendance: 9,280; Referee: Liu Kwok Man

2 October 2012 2nd Leg	Al-Ahli (Saudi Arabia)	4–1	Sepahan	Jeddah, Saudi Arabia
20:15 UTC+03:00	Simões 30' (pen.); Al Hosni 35'; Al Hosni 45'; Jaizawi 70'; Jaizawi (yellow card); Al-Khames (yellow card)	Report	Talebi 37'; Ebrahimi (yellow card); Mohammadi (red card)	Stadium: Prince Abdullah al-Faisal Stadium; Attendance: 16,838; Referee: Peter Green

==== AFC Champions League 2013 ====
===== Group stage =====
Win Draw Loss Postponed

Date Round	Home	Score	Away	Location

27 February 2013 Match day 1	Sepahan	3–0	(United Arab Emirates) Al-Nasr	Fooladshahr, Iran
19:30 UTC+03:30	Sukaj 22'; Sukaj 81'; Ebrahimi 87'	Report		Stadium: Fooladshahr Stadium; Attendance: 5,700; Referee: Yuichi Nishimura

13 March 2013 Match day 2	Al-Gharafa (Qatar)	3–1	Sepahan	Doha, Qatar
18:15 UTC+03:00	Cisse 16'; Cisse 58'; Siddiq 92'; Burhan (yellow card); Quaye (yellow card); Nenê (yellow card); Al-Shammari (yellow card)	Report	Ahmadi 13'; Ahmadi (yellow card); Hajsafi (yellow card)	Stadium: Thani bin Jassim Stadium; Attendance: 5,685; Referee: Lee Min Hu

2 April 2013 Match day 3	Sepahan	2–4	(Saudi Arabia) Al-Ahli	Fooladshahr, Iran
20:30 UTC+03:30	Sukaj 3'; Talebi 86'; Talebi (yellow card); Khalatbari (yellow card); Papi (yellow card)	Report	Simões 23'; César 39'; Al Hosni 46'; Simões 65'; Simões (yellow card)	Stadium: Fooladshahr Stadium; Attendance: 9,124; Referee: Vladisilav Tseytlin

10 April 2013 Match day 4	Al-Ahli (Saudi Arabia)	4–1	Sepahan	Buraidah, Saudi Arabia
20:45 UTC+3	Al-Bassas 44'; Al-Bassas 62'; César 68' (pen.); Al-Khames 90+1'; Palomino (yellow card); César (yellow card)	Report	Đalović 82'; Gholami (yellow card); Susak (yellow card); Irannejad (yellow card); Jafari (yellow card)	Stadium: King Abdullah Sport City Stadium; Attendance: 11,158; Referee: Strebre Delovski

23 April 2013 Match day 5	Al-Nasr (United Arab Emirates)	1–2	Sepahan	Dubai, UAE
20:00 UTC+3	Muhammed 71'; Mascara (yellow card)	Report	Đalović 29'; Gholami 79'	Stadium: Al-Maktoum Stadium; Attendance: 400; Referee: Abdullah M. Al-hilali

30 April 2013 Match day 6	Sepahan	3–1	(Qatar) Al-Gharafa	Fooladshahr, Iran
20:30 UTC+3:30	Jahan Alian 11'; Gholami 48'; Khalatbari 55'	Report	Siddiq 44'	Stadium: Fooladshahr Stadium; Attendance: 1,200; Referee: Jumpei Iida

=== Friendly Matches ===
Win Draw Loss Postponed

Date Round	Home	Score	Away	Location

26 June 2012 1	Sepahan	0–1	(Azerbaijan) Neftchi Baku	Bolu, Turkey
18:00 UTC+02:00		Report	Flavinho 33'

28 June 2012 2	Sepahan	1–1	(Russia) Volga	Bolu, Turkey
18:30 UTC+02:00	Sukaj 36'	Report	Sapogov (87 p.)

1 July 2012 3	Sepahan	0–3	(Bulgaria) CSKA Sofia	Kızılcahamam, Turkey
16:00 UTC+02:00		Report	Coda 46'; Yanev 51'; Mendes 84'

4 July 2012 4	Sepahan	0–0	(Romania) Viitorul Constanța	Kızılcahamam, Turkey
19:00 UTC+02:00		Report

12 July 2012 5	Sepahan	0–1	Naft Tehran	Isfahan, Iran
19:00 UTC+03:30		Report	Mahdavi 27'	Stadium: Jaroukan Stadium; Attendance: 2000

16 July 2012 6	Sepahan	2–4	Iran U-20	Isfahan, Iran
19:00 UTC+03:30	Irannejad 50'; Sharifi 56'	Report	Azmoun 22', 44'; Fazeli 39'; Pahlevan 42'	Stadium: Jaroukan Stadium; Attendance: 1500

26 August 2012 7	Sepahan	2–0	Sang Ahan Bafq	Isfahan, Iran
17:00 UTC+03:30	Sukaj 26'; Sharifi 80'	Report		Stadium: Jaroukan Stadium; Attendance: 500

5 September 2012 8	Sepahan	2–1	(Kuwait) Al Jahra	Dubai, United Arab Emirates
18:00 UTC+03:00	Sukaj 34'; Ebrahimi 65'	Report	Ghemlas 80'	Stadium: Za'abeel Stadium

10 September 2012 9	Sepahan	3–2	Sepahan U-23	Isfahan, Iran
17:00 UTC+03:30	Papi 23'; Sukaj 55'; Đalović 76'	Report	Maftoolkar 40', 82'	Stadium: Jaroukan Stadium; Attendance: 200

9 October 2012 10	Rah Ahan	1–1	Sepahan	Tehran, Iran
17:00 UTC+03:30	Razaghirad 12'	Report	Jahan Alian 38'	Stadium: Ekbatan Stadium; Attendance: 500

9 November 2012 11	Sepahan	3–0	Sepahan U-23	Isfahan, Iran
16:00 UTC+03:30	Papi 25'; Jahan Alian 37'; Navidkia 71'	Report		Stadium: Jaroukan Stadium; Attendance: 300

12 November 2012 12	Sepahan	2–4	Zob Ahan	Isfahan, Iran
15:00 UTC+03:30	Talebi 36'; Sharifi 71'	Report	Farhadi 27', 76'; Barani 65'; Sadeghian 87'	Stadium: Bagh-e Ferdows Stadium; Attendance: 600

== Statistics ==
=== Appearances ===
Last updated on 11 May 2013

No.	Pos	Nat	Player	Total		Iran Pro League		Hazfi Cup		2012 ACL		2013 ACL	
No.	Pos	Nat	Player	Apps	Goals	Apps	Goals	Apps	Goals	Apps	Goals	Apps	Goals
1	GK	(Iran) IRI	Mohammad Bagher Sadeghi	15	0	11+0+0	0	2+0+0	0	0+0+1	0	1+0+0	0
2	DF	(Iran) IRI	Hassan Ashjari	17	0	12+3+0	0	0+0+0	0	2+0+0	0	0+0+0	0
3	DF	(Iran) IRI	Farshid Talebi	40	6	27+2+0	3	4+0+0	1	2+0+0	1	4+1+0	1
4	MF	(Iran) IRI	Moharram Navidkia	39	8	16+12+1	8	0+5+0	0	1+1+0	0	1+0+2	0
5	DF	(Iran) IRI	Mohammad Ali Ahmadi	40	1	23+2+3	0	4+0+1	0	2+0+0	0	5+0+0	1
6	DF	(Iran) IRI	Hadi Tamini	10	2	9+0+1	2	0+0+0	0	0+0+0	0	0+0+0	0
6	DF	(Australia) AUS	Milan Susak	18	0	8+2+1	0	3+0+0	0	0+0+0	0	4+0+0	0
7	MF	(Iran) IRI	Milad Zeneyedpour	6	0	0+4+2	0	0+0+0	0	0+0+0	0	0+0+0	0
8	FW	(Iran) IRI	Mohammad Gholami	35	4	3+5+17	0	1+2+1	2	0+0+1	0	2+0+3	2
9	MF	(Iran) IRI	Mehdi Jafarpour	18	0	5+4+5	0	1+0+0	0	1+1+0	0	0+1+0	0
10	MF	(Iran) IRI	Hossein Papi	33	0	11+6+5	0	3+1+1	0	0+0+0	0	3+0+3	0
11	DF	(Iran) IRI	Mohsen Irannejad	24	0	2+1+12	0	2+1+1	0	0+0+0	0	2+0+3	0
12	MF	(Iran) IRI	Ali Karimi	1	0	0+0+0	0	0+0+0	0	0+0+0	0	0+0+1	0
14	FW	(Albania) ALB	Xhevahir Sukaj	44	16	3+11+18	11	0+2+3	2	0+0+2	0	3+1+1	3
15	MF	(Iran) IRI	Omid Ebrahimi	44	9	30+2+0	8	4+0+0	0	1+1+0	0	5+1+0	1
17	DF	(Iran) IRI	Abolhassan Jafari	31	0	16+5+3	0	2+0+0	0	0+0+0	0	3+1+1	0
18	DF	(Iran) IRI	Mohammad Hossein Moradmand	2	0	1+0+1	0	0+0+0	0	0+0+0	0	0+0+0	0
20	MF	(Iran) IRI	Ahmad Jamshidian	29	3	2+5+14	3	0+1+2	0	0+0+2	0	0+3+0	0
21	FW	(Montenegro) MNE	Radomir Đalović	33	6	7+10+9	4	0+0+2	0	0+2+0	0	3+0+0	2
22	GK	(Iran) IRI	Reza Mohamadi	8	0	6+0+0	0	0+0+0	0	2+0+0	0	0+0+0	0
23	MF	(Iran) IRI	Amin Jahan Alian	27	4	3+12+3	3	0+2+2	0	0+0+0	0	2+2+1	1
24	MF	(Iran) IRI	Akbar Imani	2	0	0+0+0	0	0+0+1	0	0+0+0	0	0+1+0	0
25	FW	(Iran) IRI	Mehdi Sharifi	0	0	0+0+0	0	0+0+0	0	0+0+0	0	0+0+0	0
26	FW	(Iran) IRI	Ali Choupani	0	0	0+0+0	0	0+0+0	0	0+0+0	0	0+0+0	0
27	GK	(Iran) IRI	Mehdi Amini	0	0	0+0+0	0	0+0+0	0	0+0+0	0	0+0+0	0
28	DF	(Iran) IRI	Ehsan Hajsafi	24	2	15+1+0	2	1+1+1	0	0+0+0	0	2+2+1	0
30	GK	(Iran) IRI	Mohammad Nasseri	0	0	0+0+0	0	0+0+0	0	0+0+0	0	0+0+0	0
32	MF	(Iran) IRI	Hamid Reza Kazemi	0	0	0+0+0	0	0+0+0	0	0+0+0	0	0+0+0	0
33	FW	(Iran) IRI	Mohammad Reza Khalatbari	45	16	22+10+0	13	5+0+0	2	1+1+0	0	3+2+1	1
35	GK	(Iran) IRI	Shahab Gordan	25	0	17+0+0	0	3+0+0	0	0+0+0	0	5+0+0	0
36	GK	(Iran) IRI	Mohammad Mahmoudvand	0	0	0+0+0	0	0+0+0	0	0+0+0	0	0+0+0	0
38	DF	(Albania) ALB	Ervin Bulku	31	2	19+1+1	1	5+0+0	1	2+0+0	0	1+2+0	0
40	MF	(Iran) IRI	Adel Kolahkaj	10	1	7+1+0	1	0+0+0	0	2+0+0	0	0+0+0	0

Apps: x+y+z, where x means full match (90-minute) appearance, y means match starting appearance and then exchanged, z means appearance as the exchange player in the middle of the match.

=== Goal scorers ===
Includes all competitive matches. The list is sorted by shirt number when total goals are equal.

Last updated on 11 May 2013

No.	Pos.	Name	Iran Pro League	Hazfi Cup	2012 ACL	2013 ACL	Total
33	FW	(Iran) Mohammad Reza Khalatbari	13	2	0	1	16
14	FW	(Albania) Xhevahir Sukaj	11	2	0	3	16
15	MF	(Iran) Omid Ebrahimi	8	0	0	1	9
4	MF	(Iran) Moharram Navidkia	8	0	0	0	8
21	FW	(Montenegro) Radomir Đalović	4	0	0	2	6
3	DF	(Iran) Farshid Talebi	3	1	1	1	6
23	MF	(Iran) Amin Jahan Alian	3	0	0	1	4
8	FW	(Iran) Mohammad Gholami	0	2	0	2	4
20	MF	(Iran) Ahmad Jamshidian	3	0	0	0	3
6	DF	(Iran) Hadi Tamini	2	0	0	0	2
28	DF	(Iran) Ehsan Hajsafi	2	0	0	0	2
38	DF	(Albania) Ervin Bulku	1	1	0	0	2
40	MF	(Iran) Adel Kolahkaj	1	0	0	0	1
5	DF	(Iran) Mohammad Ali Ahmadi	0	0	0	1	1
Own goal			1	0	0	0	1
TOTALS			60	8	1	12	81

Friendlies and Pre-season goals are not recognized as competitive match goals.

=== Disciplinary record ===
Includes all competitive matches. Players with 1 card or more included only.

Last updated on 11 May 2013

			Iran Pro League			Hazfi Cup			2012 ACL			2013 ACL			Total		
No.	Pos.	Name	Yellow card	(yellow card) (yellow-red card)	Red card	Yellow card	(yellow card) (yellow-red card)	Red card	Yellow card	(yellow card) (yellow-red card)	Red card	Yellow card	(yellow card) (yellow-red card)	Red card	Yellow card	(yellow card) (yellow-red card)	Red card
33	FW	(Iran) Mohammad Reza Khalatbari	7	0	0	2	0	0	0	0	0	1	0	0	10	0	0
5	DF	(Iran) Mohammad Ali Ahmadi	6	1	0	1	0	0	0	0	0	1	0	0	8	1	0
15	MF	(Iran) Omid Ebrahimi	6	0	0	1	0	0	1	0	0	0	0	0	8	0	0
3	DF	(Iran) Farshid Talebi	6	1	1	0	0	1	0	0	0	1	0	0	7	1	2
38	DF	(Albania) Ervin Bulku	5	1	0	1	0	0	0	0	0	0	0	0	6	1	0
17	DF	(Iran) Abolhassan Jafari	5	0	1	0	0	0	0	0	0	1	0	0	6	0	1
21	FW	(Montenegro) Radomir Đalović	3	0	0	0	0	0	0	0	0	0	0	0	3	0	0
40	MF	(Iran) Adel Kolahkaj	3	0	0	0	0	0	0	0	0	0	0	0	3	0	0
14	FW	(Albania) Xhevahir Sukaj	3	0	0	0	0	0	0	0	0	0	0	0	3	0	0
6	DF	(Australia) Milan Susak	2	1	0	0	0	0	0	0	0	1	0	0	3	1	0
28	DF	(Iran) Ehsan Hajsafi	2	0	1	0	0	0	0	0	0	1	0	0	3	0	1
6	DF	(Iran) Hadi Tamini	2	0	0	0	0	0	0	0	0	0	0	0	2	0	0
9	MF	(Iran) Mehdi Jafarpour	2	0	0	0	0	0	0	0	0	0	0	0	2	0	0
4	MF	(Iran) Moharram Navidkia	1	0	0	0	0	0	1	0	0	0	0	0	2	0	0
11	DF	(Iran) Mohsen Irannejad	1	0	0	0	0	0	0	0	0	1	0	0	2	0	0
2	DF	(Iran) Hassan Ashjari	1	0	0	0	0	0	0	0	0	0	0	0	1	0	0
7	MF	(Iran) Milad Zeneyedpour	1	0	0	0	0	0	0	0	0	0	0	0	1	0	0
23	MF	(Iran) Amin Jahan Alian	1	0	0	0	0	0	0	0	0	0	0	0	1	0	0
35	GK	(Iran) Shahab Gordan	1	0	0	0	0	0	0	0	0	0	0	0	1	0	0
1	GK	(Iran) Mohammad Bagher Sadeghi	0	0	0	1	0	0	0	0	0	0	0	0	1	0	0
8	FW	(Iran) Mohammad Gholami	0	0	0	0	0	0	0	0	0	1	0	0	1	0	0
10	MF	(Iran) Hossein Papi	0	0	0	0	0	0	0	0	0	1	0	0	1	0	0
18	DF	(Iran) Hossein Moradmand	0	1	0	0	0	0	0	0	0	0	0	0	0	1	0
22	GK	(Iran) Reza Mohamadi	0	0	0	0	0	0	0	0	1	0	0	0	0	0	1
TOTALS			58	5	3	6	0	1	2	0	1	9	0	0	75	5	5

=== Goals conceded ===
Last updated on 11 May 2013

			Iran Pro League		Hazfi Cup		2012 ACL		2013 ACL		Total		
No.	Pos.	Name	Apps.	G. cond.	Apps.	G. cond.	Apps.	G. cond.	Apps.	G. cond.	Apps.	G. cond.	Clean Sheets
1	GK	(Iran) Mohammad Bagher Sadeghi	11	10	2	1	1	4	1	1	15	16	4
22	GK	(Iran) Reza Mohamadi	6	8	0	0	1	0	0	0	7	8	4
35	GK	(Iran) Shahab Gordan	17	15	3	3	0	0	5	12	25	30	8
TOTALS			34	33	5	4	2	4	6	13	47	54	16

=== Own goals ===
Last updated on 11 May 2013

No.	Pos.	Name	Iran Pro League	Hazfi Cup	2012 ACL	2013 ACL	Total
2	DF	(Iran) Hassan Ashjari	1	0	0	0	1
11	DF	(Iran) Mohsen Irannejad	1	0	0	0	1
TOTALS			2	0	0	0	2

=== Total minutes played ===
Last updated on 11 May 2013

No.	Pos.	Name	Iran Pro League	Hazfi Cup	2012 ACL	2013 ACL	Total
15	MF	(Iran) Omid Ebrahimi	2840	450	152	526	3968
33	FW	(Iran) Mohammad Reza Khalatbari	2691	540	119	479	3829
5	DF	(Iran) Mohammad Ali Ahmadi	2284	512	180	450	3426
3	DF	(Iran) Farshid Talebi	2470	326	180	401	3377
4	MF	(Iran) Moharram Navidkia	2344	453	176	159	3132
38	DF	(Albania) Ervin Bulku	1764	540	180	236	2720
17	DF	(Iran) Abolhassan Jafari	1850	210	0	401	2461
10	MF	(Iran) Hossein Papi	1533	460	0	354	2347
14	FW	(Albania) Xhevahir Sukaj	1654	252	63	353	2322
35	GK	(Iran) Shahab Gordan	1530	330	0	450	2310
21	FW	(Montenegro) Radomir Đalović	1383	107	135	270	1905
28	DF	(Iran) Ehsan Hajsafi	1351	223	0	297	1871
23	MF	(Iran) Amin Jahan Alian	1060	142	0	312	1514
8	FW	(Iran) Mohammad Gholami	1003	256	7	236	1502
2	DF	(Iran) Hassan Ashjari	1305	0	180	0	1485
6	DF	(Australia) Milan Susak	786	330	0	360	1476
1	GK	(Iran) Mohammad Bagher Sadeghi	990	210	64	90	1354
20	MF	(Iran) Ahmad Jamshidian	944	104	67	183	1298
11	DF	(Iran) Mohsen Irannejad	557	353	0	299	1209
9	MF	(Iran) Mehdi Jafarpour	904	90	203	0	1197
40	MF	(Iran) Adel Kolahkaj	700	0	180	0	880
6	DF	(Iran) Hadi Tamini	829	0	0	0	829
22	GK	(Iran) Reza Mohamadi	540	0	117	0	657
7	MF	(Iran) Milad Zeneyedpour	247	0	0	0	247
18	DF	(Iran) Hossein Moradmand	145	0	0	0	145
24	MF	(Iran) Akbar Imani	0	1	0	45	46
12	MF	(Iran) Ali Karimi	0	0	0	17	17
TOTALS			32763	5883	1935	5986	46573

=== Overall statistics ===
Last updated on 11 May 2013

	Total	Home	Away	Neutral
Games played	47	23	24	0
Games won	27	15	12	0
Games drawn	8	3	5	0
Games lost	12	5	7	0
Biggest win	4–0	3–0	4–0	0
Biggest loss	4-1	4-1	4-1	0
Biggest win (League)	4–0	3–0	4-0	0
Biggest win (Cup)	2-0	2-0	1-0	0
Biggest win (Asia)	3-0	3-0	2-1	0
Biggest loss (League)	4-1	4-1	1-0	0
Biggest loss (Cup)	-	-	-	-
Biggest loss (Asia)	4-1	4-2	4-1	0
Clean sheets	16	10	6	0
Goals scored	81	43	38	0
Goals conceded	54	24	30	0
Goal difference	+27	+19	+8	0
Average GF per game	1.72	1.87	1.58	0
Average GA per game	1.15	1.04	1.25	0
Points	89	48	41	0
Winning rate	57%	65%	50%	0
Most appearances	45	Mohammad Reza Khalatbari		
Most minutes played	3968	Omid Ebrahimi		
Top scorer	16	Khalatbari / Sukaj		
Top assister	21	Mohammad Reza Khalatbari		

== Club ==
=== Coaching staff ===
Position	Staff
Head coach	(Croatia) Zlatko Kranjčar
Assistant coach	(Iran) Mahmoud Karimi
Fitness trainer	(Germany) Benjamin Kugel
Goalkeepers coach	(Croatia) Tonči Merdolias
Analyzer	(Iran) Masoud Palizdar
Doctor	(Iran) Mohammad Rashadi
Assistant doctor	(Iran) Asghar Shirkosh
Football Academy Manager	(Iran) Reza Fatahi
Reserves team head coach	(Iran) Mohammad Yavari
Team manager	(Iran) Rasoul Khorvash

=== Other personnel ===
President	(Iran) Alireza Rahimi
Vice President	(Iran) Mohammad Reza Saket

Updated to match played 30 August 2012

=== Grounds ===
Ground (capacity and dimensions)	Fooladshahr Stadium (31,439 / 110x75m)
Training ground	Jaroukan Stadium

== See also ==
- 2012 AFC Champions League
- 2013 AFC Champions League
- 2012–13 Persian Gulf Cup
- 2012–13 Hazfi Cup
