= 2013–14 Sepahan F.C. season =

Sepahan
2013–14 season
- Chairman: Mohammad Torabian
- Manager: (Croatia) Zlatko Kranjčar
- Stadium: Foolad Shahr Stadium
- Iran Pro League: 4th
- Hazfi Cup: 1/16
- AFC Champions League: Group Stage
- Top goalscorer: League: Mehdi Sharifi (8); All: Mehdi Sharifi (12)
- Highest home attendance: 12,000 vs Persepolis (Iran Pro League, 20 September 2013)
- Lowest home attendance: 1,000 vs Damash Gilan (Iran Pro League, 11 January 2014)
- Average home league attendance: 4,455
Home colours	Away colours	Third colours

The 2013–14 season was Sepahan's 13th season in the Pro League, and their 20th consecutive season in the top division of Iranian Football and 60th year in existence as a football club. They also competed in the Hazfi Cup and the AFC Champions League. Sepahan was captained by Moharram Navidkia.

== Players ==
Last updated on 14 July 2014

Under-23 players	Under-21 players	Under-19 players

Out during the season (injured, transferred, or released)

No.	Name	Nationality	Position(s)	Since	Date of birth (age)	Signed from	Appearance (s)	Goal (s)
Goalkeepers
1	Rahman Ahmadi	(Iran)	GK	2008	30 July 1980 (age 46)	Persepolis, Saipa	85	0
27	Mehdi Amini	(Iran)	GK	2012	27 March 1996 (age 30)	(Youth system)	0	0
35	Shahab Gordan	(Iran)	GK	2013	22 May 1984 (age 42)	Persepolis	20	0
36	Mohammad Mahmoudvand	(Iran)	GK	2013	2 March 1985 (age 41)	Aboumoslem	0	0
Defenders
3	Shoja' Khalilzadeh	(Iran)	CB	2013	14 May 1989 (age 37)	Mes Kerman	26	0
5	Hadi Aghili	(Iran)	CB	2004	15 January 1981 (age 45)	Saipa, Qatar SC	205	19
6	Mohammad Ali Ahmadi	(Iran)	CB	2012	24 June 1983 (age 43)	Zob Ahan	48	0
18	Mohammad Hossein Moradmand	(Iran)	CB	2012	22 June 1993 (age 33)	(Youth system)	9	0
19	Ali Gholami	(Iran)	CB	2013	3 May 1994 (age 32)	(Youth system)	0	0
24	Armin Sohrabian	(Iran)	LB, LM	2013	26 July 1995 (age 31)	(Youth system)	0	0
28	Ehsan Hajsafi	(Iran)	LB, LM	2006	25 February 1990 (age 36)	(Youth system), Tractor Sazi	184	24
30	Ahmad Eskandari	(Iran)	RB	2013	30 November 1993 (age 32)	(Youth system)	0	0
33	Saeed Ghaedifar	(Iran)	LB	2013	13 April 1992 (age 34)	(Youth system)	0	0
39	Mohammad Roshandel	(Iran)	RB, CB	2013	2 July 1995 (age 31)	(Youth system)	0	0
40	Ali Hamoudi	(Iran)	RB, RWB	2013	21 March 1986 (age 40)	Esteghlal	28	1
Midfielders
4	Moharram Navidkia (captain)	(Iran)	AM	1998	1 November 1982 (age 43)	(Youth system), (Germany) VfL Bochum	258	41
7	Hossein Papi	(Iran)	RM, LM	2004	27 February 1985 (age 41)	(Youth system), Sepahan Novin	146	1
12	Ali Karimi	(Iran)	AM, CM	2012	11 February 1994 (age 32)	(Youth system)	16	2
15	Omid Ebrahimi	(Iran)	DM	2010	16 September 1987 (age 38)	Sh. Bandar Abbas	117	18
17	Milad Sarlak	(Iran)	CM, AM	2013	26 March 1995 (age 31)	(Youth system)	0	0
23	Amin Jahan Alian	(Iran)	RM, AM	2012	16 June 1991 (age 35)	(Youth system)	33	4
32	Hamid Reza Kazemi	(Iran)	CM	2011	25 May 1992 (age 34)	(Youth system)	1	0
38	Ervin Bulku	(Albania)	DM, RM	2012	3 March 1981 (age 45)	(Azerbaijan) AZAL Baku	47	1
45	Ehsan Pahlevan	(Iran)	LM, RM	2013	25 July 1993 (age 33)	Zob Ahan	1	0
88	Yaghoub Karimi	(Iran)	LM, RM	2013	31 August 1991 (age 35)	Naft Tehran	17	1
99	Amir Hossein Karimi	(Iran)	AM	2013	9 February 1996 (age 30)	(Youth system)	6	0
Forwards
9	Mohammad Gholami	(Iran)	CF	2012	13 February 1983 (age 43)	Damash	51	6
10	Sergio van Dijk	(Indonesia)	CF	2014	6 August 1982 (age 44)	(Indonesia) Persib Bandung	7	1
14	Xhevahir Sukaj	(Albania)	CF	2012	5 October 1987 (age 38)	(Turkey) Gençlerbirliği	49	13
20	Mehdi Sharifi	(Iran)	CF	2012	16 August 1992 (age 34)	(Youth system)	19	8
26	Ali Choupani	(Iran)	CF	2012	26 April 1993 (age 33)	(Youth system)	0	0

No.	Name	Nationality	Position(s)	Since	Date of birth (age)	Signed from	Appearance (s)	Goal (s)
8	Mojtaba Jabbari	(Iran)	AM	2013	16 June 1983 (age 43)	Esteghlal Tehran	5	0
10	Arash Afshin	(Iran)	CF	2013	21 January 1989 (age 37)	Foolad	14	1
11	Mohsen Irannejad	(Iran)	LB, LWB	2012	15 July 1985 (age 41)	Shahin Bushehr	19	0
21	Radomir Đalović	(Montenegro)	CF	2012	29 October 1982 (age 43)	(Russia) FC Amkar Perm	39	6

== Transfers ==
Last updated on 31 December 2013

=== Summer ===
In: Note: Flags indicate national team as defined under FIFA eligibility rules; some limited exceptions apply. Players may hold more than one non-FIFA nationality.

No.	Pos.	Nation	Player
17	MF	IRN	Yaghoub Karimi ^{PL} (from Naft Tehran)
1	GK	IRN	Rahman Ahmadi ^{PL} (from Saipa)
40	DF	IRN	Ali Hamoudi ^{PL} (from Esteghlal)
5	DF	IRN	Hadi Aghili (from Qatar SC)
19	DF	IRN	Ali Gholami (from Sepahan youth)
3	DF	IRN	Shoja' Khalilzadeh ^{PL} (from Mes Kerman)
10	FW	IRN	Arash Afshin ^{PL} (from Foolad)
8	MF	IRN	Mojtaba Jabbari ^{PL} (from Esteghlal)
33	DF	IRN	Saeed Ghaedifar (from Sepahan youth)
29	DF	IRN	Ahmad Eskandari (from Sepahan youth)

Out: Note: Flags indicate national team as defined under FIFA eligibility rules; some limited exceptions apply. Players may hold more than one non-FIFA nationality.

No.	Pos.	Nation	Player
20	MF	IRN	Ahmad Jamshidian (to Esteghlal)
9	MF	IRN	Mehdi Jafarpour (to Saipa)
17	DF	IRN	Abolhassan Jafari (to Foolad)
24	MF	IRN	Akbar Imani (to Zob Ahan)
30	GK	IRN	Mohammad Nasseri (On Loan at Gostaresh Foolad)
1	GK	IRN	Mohammad-Bagher Sadeghi (to Saipa)
3	DF	IRN	Farshid Talebi (to Tractor Sazi)
6	DF	AUS	Milan Susak (to (United Arab Emirates) Al Wasl)
33	FW	IRN	Mohammad Reza Khalatbari (to (United Arab Emirates) Ajman)

=== Winter ===
In: Note: Flags indicate national team as defined under FIFA eligibility rules; some limited exceptions apply. Players may hold more than one non-FIFA nationality.

No.	Pos.	Nation	Player
99	MF	IRN	Amir Hossein Karimi (from Sepahan U21)
45	MF	IRN	Ehsan Pahlevan (On loan from Zob Ahan)
17	MF	IRN	Milad Sarlak (from Sepahan U21)
24	DF	IRN	Armin Sohrabian (from Sepahan U21)
39	DF	IRN	Mohammad Roshandel (from Sepahan U21)
10	FW	IDN	Sergio van Dijk (from (Indonesia) Persib Bandung)

Out: Note: Flags indicate national team as defined under FIFA eligibility rules; some limited exceptions apply. Players may hold more than one non-FIFA nationality.

No.	Pos.	Nation	Player
8	MF	IRN	Mojtaba Jabbari (to (Qatar) Al Ahli)
11	DF	IRN	Mohsen Irannejad (On loan at Zob Ahan)
10	FW	IRN	Arash Afshin (to Foolad)
21	FW	MNE	Radomir Đalović (to (China) Shenxin)

== Technical staff ==
Position	Staff
Head coach	(Croatia) Zlatko Kranjčar
Assistant coach	(Iran) Mahmoud Karimi (Iran) Ghasem Zaghinejad
Goalkeepers coach	(Croatia) Tonči Merdolias
Fitness trainer	(Croatia) Luka Radman
Translator	(Iran) Reza Chalangar
Analyzer	(Iran) Manouchehr Rezaei
Physiotherapist	(Iran) Abbas Yousefzadeh
Doctor	(Iran) Mohammad Rashadi
Executive manager	(Iran) Mohammad Faramarzi

== Statistics ==
Last updated on 21 May 2014

=== Players performance ===
			Iran Pro League					Hazfi Cup				2014 ACL					Total				
N	P	Name	P	S		A	M	P	S	A	M	P	S		A	M	P	S		A	M
1	GK	(Iran) Rahman Ahmadi	27	27		1	2430	1	1		90	3	3			270	31	31		1	2790
3	DF	(Iran) Shoja' Khalilzadeh	26	26		1	2340	1	1		90	6	6			540	33	33		1	2970
4	MF	(Iran) Moharram Navidkia	5	3	1	2	307					4	3		2	303	9	6	1	4	710
5	DF	(Iran) Hadi Aghili	27	27	5		2365	1	1		64	6	6			540	34	34	5		2969
6	DF	(Iran) Ali Ahmadi	20	15			1413	1			26	3	3			225	24	18			1664
7	MF	(Iran) Hossein Papi	30	30		7	2593	1			45	6	6		3	524	37	36		10	3162
8	MF	(Iran) Mojtaba Jabari	5	5			445										5	5			445
9	FW	(Iran) Mohammad Gholami	26	17	6	2	1557	1			15						27	17	6	2	1572
10	FW	(Iran) Arash Afshin	14	5	1		530	1	1		90						15	6	1		620
11	DF	(Iran) Mohsen Irannejad	4	2			206										4	2			206
12	MF	(Iran) Ali Karimi	16	12	2		981					4	2			194	20	14	2		1175
14	FW	(Albania) Xhevahir Sukaj	7	1		1	200					6	1	2	1	207	13	2	2	2	407
15	MF	(Iran) Omid Ebrahimi	28	28	4	2	2509	1	1		90	6	6			540	35	35	4	2	3139
16	FW	(Indonesia) Sergio van Dijk	7	6	1		404					4	2	1		154	11	8	2		558
18	DF	(Iran) Hossein Moradmand	7	2			267										7	2			267
20	FW	(Iran) Mehdi Sharifi	19	10	8	1	1009					6	6	4	1	540	25	16	12	2	1549
21	FW	(Montenegro) Radomir Đalović	13	11	2		890	1	1		75						14	12	2		965
23	MF	(Iran) Amin Jahan Alian	15	6	1	3	571	1	1		45						16	7	1	3	616
28	DF	(Iran) Ehsan Hajsafi	29	29	2	6	2588	1	1		90	6	6			520	36	36	2	6	3198
35	GK	(Iran) Shahab Gordan	3	3			270					3	3			270	6	6			540
38	MF	(Albania) Ervin Bulku	26	25		2	2136	1	1		90	5	5	1		442	32	31	1	2	2668
40	DF	(Iran) Ali Hamoudi	28	28	1	2	2468	1	1		90	6	6			511	35	35	1	2	3069
45	MF	(Iran) Ehsan Pahlevan	1				28										1				28
88	MF	(Iran) Yaghoub Karimi	18	10	1	1	883	1	1		90	6	2			154	25	13	1	1	1127
99	MF	(Iran) Amir Hossein Karimi	6	2			181					1	0			6	7	2			187
TOTALS			407	330	35	31		14	11			81	66	8	7		502	407	43	38	

- Friendlies and Pre season matches are not considered in table data.

=== Disciplinary record ===
			Iran Pro League			Hazfi Cup			2014 ACL			Total		
N	P	Name	Booked	(yellow card) (yellow-red card)	Sent off (straight red)	Booked	(yellow card) (yellow-red card)	Sent off (straight red)	Booked	(yellow card) (yellow-red card)	Sent off (straight red)	Booked	(yellow card) (yellow-red card)	Sent off (straight red)
1	GK	(Iran) Rahman Ahmadi	1									1		
3	DF	(Iran) Shoja' Khalilzadeh	9		1	1			1			11		1
5	DF	(Iran) Hadi Aghili	5						1			6		
6	DF	(Iran) Ali Ahmadi	5	1								5	1	
7	MF	(Iran) Hossein Papi	1									1		
9	FW	(Iran) Mohammad Gholami	4									4		
11	DF	(Iran) Mohsen Irannejad	1									1		
15	MF	(Iran) Omid Ebrahimi	8						1			9		
18	DF	(Iran) Hossein Moradmand		1									1	
20	FW	(Iran) Mehdi Sharifi	3		1				1			4		1
21	FW	(Montenegro) Radomir Đalović	1									1		
23	MF	(Iran) Amin Jahan Alian	4									4		
28	DF	(Iran) Ehsan Hajsafi	1						1			2		
35	GK	(Iran) Shahab Gordan							1			1		
38	MF	(Albania) Ervin Bulku	6	1					2			8	1	
40	DF	(Iran) Ali Hamoudi	4	1					1			5	1	
88	MF	(Iran) Yaghoub Karimi	2						1			3		
TOTALS			55	4	2	1			10			66	4	2

=== Clean sheets ===
			Iran Pro League			Hazfi Cup			2014 ACL			Total		
N	P	Name	P	Gc	Cs	P	Gc	Cs	P	Gc	Cs	P	Gc	Cs
1	GK	(Iran) Rahman Ahmadi	27	16	15	1	1		3	7		31	24	15
35	GK	(Iran) Shahab Gordan	3	4	1				3	1	2	6	5	3
TOTALS			30	20	16	1	1		6	8	2	37	29	18

=== Own goals ===
N	P	Name	Iran Pro League	Hazfi Cup	2014 ACL	Total
5	DF	(Iran) Hadi Aghili	1			1
TOTALS			1			1

=== Overall statistics ===
Team performance	Iran Pro League			Hazfi Cup			2014 ACL			Total		
Team performance	H	A	Tot	H	A	Tot	H	A	Tot	H	A	Tot
Games played	15	15	30	—	1	1	3	3	6	18	19	37
Games won	8	6	14	—	0	0	2	0	2	10	6	16
Games drawn	5	7	12	—	0	0	0	1	1	5	8	13
Games lost	2	2	4	—	1	1	1	2	3	3	5	8
Biggest win	3-0	2-0	3-0	—	—	—	4-0	—	4-0	4-0	2-0	4-0
Biggest loss	1-2	0-2	0-2	—	0-1	0-1	1-2	1-3	1-3	1-2	1-3	1-3
Goals scored	20	16	36	—	0	0	8	1	9	28	17	45
Goals conceded	7	13	20	—	1	1	4	4	8	11	18	29
Average Goals scored per game	1.33	1.07	1.2	—	0	0	2.67	0.33	1.5	1.56	0.89	1.22
Average Goals conceded per game	0.47	0.87	0.67	—	1	1	1.33	1.33	1.33	0.61	0.95	0.78
Points	29	25	54	—	0	0	6	1	7	35	26	61
Winning rate	53%	40%	47%	—	0%	0%	67%	0%	33%	56%	32%	43%

== Competitions ==
Last updated on 13 July 2014

=== Overview ===
Competition	Started round	Current position / round	Final position / round	First match	Last match
2013–14 Iran Pro League	—	—	4th	24 July 2013	11 April 2014
2013–14 Hazfi Cup	Round of 32	—	1/16 Final	29 October 2013	29 October 2013
AFC Champions League	Group stage	—	Group stage	25 February 2014	22 April 2014

Source: Competitions

=== Iran Pro League ===
==== Standings ====
Pos	Team	Pld	W	D	L	GF	GA	GD	Pts	Qualification or relegation
2	Persepolis	30	16	8	6	34	15	+19	55 (Note: Esteghlal, Malavan, Damash, Persepolis and Tractor Sazi were deducted 1 point due to poor fan behavior in their home matches.)	Qualification for the 2015 AFC Champions League group stage
3	Naft Tehran	30	15	9	6	39	23	+16	54	Qualification for the 2015 AFC Champions League qualifying play-off
4	Sepahan	30	14	12	4	36	20	+16	54	
5	Esteghlal	30	15	9	6	34	25	+9	53	
6	Tractor Sazi	30	11	13	6	39	33	+6	45	Qualification for the 2015 AFC Champions League group stage (Note: Tractor Sazi secured qualification for the 2015 AFC Champions League through winning the 2013–14 Hazfi Cup.)

Updated to match(es) played on 11 April 2014. Source: FIFA.com
Rules for classification: 1) points; 2) goal difference; 3) number of goals scored.

==== Results summary ====
Overall								Home						Away					
Pld	W	D	L	GF	GA	GD	Pts	W	D	L	GF	GA	GD	W	D	L	GF	GA	GD
30	14	12	4	36	20	+16	54	8	5	2	20	7	+13	6	7	2	16	13	+3

Source: Ipl Stats

==== Results by round ====
Round	1	2	3	4	5	6	7	8	9	10	11	12	13	14	15	16	17	18	19	20	21	22	23	24	25	26	27	28	29	30
Ground	H	A	A	H	A	H	A	H	A	H	A	H	A	H	A	A	H	H	A	H	A	H	A	H	A	H	A	H	A	H
Result	W	W	D	L	L	W	D	D	W	W	W	D	D	L	D	D	D	D	W	W	W	W	D	W	L	W	D	D	W	W
Position	1	1	1	4	6	4	6	6	5	2	2	2	3	5	6	6	6	6	6	6	5	4	4	4	5	4	5	5	5	4

Source: "Ipl".
A = Away; H = Home; W = Win; D = Draw; L = Loss

==== Matches ====
Win Draw Loss Postponed

Date Round	Home	Score	Away	Location

25 July 2013 1	Sepahan	2–0	Foolad	Fooladshahr
22:00 UTC+03:30	Gholami 45+1'; Hamoudi 90+2'; Khalilzadeh (yellow card); Irannejad (yellow card); Jahan Alian (yellow card); Hamoudi (yellow card); Bulku (yellow card)	Report	Rahmani (yellow card); Sharifat (yellow card); Noori (yellow card); Karami (yellow card)	Stadium: Fooladshahr Stadium; Attendance: - Referee: Touraj Haghverdi

1 August 2013 2	Esteghlal	1–2	Sepahan	Tehran
22:15 UTC+03:30	Sadeghi 77'; Majidi (yellow card); Sadeghi (yellow card); Akbarpour (yellow card)		Afshin 1'; Aghili 55' (pen.); Gholami (yellow card); Ebrahimi (yellow card); Bulku (yellow card)	Stadium: Azadi Stadium; Attendance: 65,000; Referee: Alireza Faghani

6 August 2013 3	Gostaresh Foolad	1–1	Sepahan	Tabriz
22:00 UTC+03:30	Ghoreishi 7'; Ghoreishi (yellow card); Kamdar (yellow card); Bayrami (yellow card)		Gholami 90+1'	Stadium: Yadegar-e Emam Stadium; Attendance: 2,000; Referee: Ashkan Khorshidi

11 August 2013 4	Sepahan	0–1	Tractor Sazi	Fooladshahr
19:45 UTC+03:30	Aghili (yellow card)		Karimi 70' (pen.); Assadi (yellow card); Ansarifard (yellow card)	Stadium: Fooladshahr Stadium; Attendance: 10,000; Referee: Saeed Mozafarizadeh

17 August 2013 5	Fajr Sepasi	2–1	Sepahan	Shiraz
19:45 UTC+03:30	Ansari 64'; Heidari 83'; Jalili (yellow card); Koohnavard (yellow card)		Đalović 41'; Ebrahimi (yellow card)	Stadium: Dastgheib Stadium; Attendance: 5,000; Referee: Shahin Hajibabaei

23 August 2013 6	Sepahan	2–1	Saba	Fooladshahr
19:45 UTC+03:30	Gholami 10'; Gholami 38'; Ahmadi (yellow card); Ebrahimi (yellow card); Jahan Alian (yellow card); Bulku (yellow card)		Pakizeh 84'; Pouromrani (yellow card)	Stadium: Fooladshahr Stadium; Attendance: 6,000; Referee: Reza Kermanshahi

30 August 2013 7	Damash	1–1	Sepahan	Rasht
19:30 UTC+03:30				Stadium: Shahid Dr. Azodi Stadium; Attendance: 8,000; Referee: Daneshmehr

5 September 2013 8	Sepahan	0–0	Rah Ahan	Fooladshahr
18:45 UTC+03:30				Stadium: Fooladshahr Stadium; Attendance: 2,000; Referee: Ashkan Khorshidi

13 September 2013 9	Esteghlal Khuzestan	0–2	Sepahan	Ahvaz
18:45 UTC+03:30				Stadium: Takhti Stadium; Attendance: 4,000; Referee: Mo'oud Bonyadifar

20 September 2013 10	Sepahan	2–0	Persepolis	Fooladshahr
20:00 UTC+03:30				Stadium: Fooladshahr Stadium; Attendance: 12,000; Referee: Mohsen Ghahremani

27 September 2013 11	Zob Ahan	0–1	Sepahan	Fooladshahr
17:15 UTC+03:30				Stadium: Fooladshahr Stadium; Attendance: 7,500; Referee: Alborz Hajipoor

4 October 2013 12	Sepahan	0–0	Mes Kerman	Fooladshahr
16:00 UTC+03:30				Stadium: Fooladshahr Stadium; Attendance: 3,000

18 October 2013 13	Saipa	0–0	Sepahan	Karaj
15:00 UTC+03:30				Stadium: Enghelab Stadium; Attendance: 2,000

24 October 2013 14	Sepahan	1–2	Malavan	Fooladshahr
15:00 UTC+03:30				Stadium: Fooladshahr Stadium; Attendance: 2,000

3 November 2013 15	Naft Tehran	2–2	Sepahan	Tehran
15:00 UTC+03:30				Stadium: Shahid Dastgerdi Stadium; Attendance: 1,000

29 November 2013 16	Foolad	0–0	Sepahan	Ahwaz
15:00 UTC+03:30				Stadium: Ghadir Stadium; Attendance: 7,000

5 December 2013 17	Sepahan	0–0	Esteghlal	Fooladshahr
15:00 UTC+03:30				Stadium: Fooladshahr Stadium; Attendance: 10,000

12 December 2013 18	Sepahan	0–0	Gostaresh Foolad	Fooladshahr
15:00 UTC+03:30				Stadium: Fooladshahr Stadium; Attendance: 2,000

20 December 2013 19	Tractor Sazi	1–2	Sepahan	Tabriz
15:00 UTC+03:30				Stadium: Yadegar-e Emam Stadium; Attendance: 5,000

24 December 2013 20	Sepahan	3–0	Fajr Sepasi	Fooladshahr
15:00 UTC+03:30				Stadium: Fooladshahr Stadium; Attendance: 1,500

4 January 2014 21	Saba Qom	0–1	Sepahan	Qom
				Stadium: Yadegar-e-Imam Stadium; Attendance: 1,000

11 January 2014 22	Sepahan	2–0	Damash Gilan	Fooladshahr
				Stadium: Fooladshahr Stadium; Attendance: 1,000

16 January 2014 23	Rah Ahan	1–1	Sepahan	Tehran
				Stadium: Takhti Stadium; Attendance: 1,000

26 January 2014 24	Sepahan	3–1	Esteghlal Khuzestan	Fooladshahr
				Stadium: Fooladshahr Stadium; Attendance: 1,100

31 January 2014 25	Persepolis	2–0	Sepahan	Tehran
				Stadium: Azadi Stadium; Attendance: 20,000

7 February 2014 26	Sepahan	1–0	Zob Ahan	Fooladshahr
				Stadium: Fooladshahr Stadium; Attendance: 5,000

20 February 2014 27	Mes Kerman	0–0	Sepahan	Kerman
				Stadium: Shahid Bahonar Stadium; Referee: 6,000

27 March 2014 28	Sepahan	2–2	Saipa	Fooladshahr
				Stadium: Fooladshahr Stadium; Attendance: 3,000

6 April 2014 29	Malavan	2–3	Sepahan	Bandar-e Anzali
				Stadium: Takhti Stadium; Referee: 2,000

11 April 2014 30	Sepahan	1–0	Naft Tehran	Fooladshahr
				Stadium: Fooladshahr Stadium; Referee: 8,000

=== Hazfi Cup ===
Win Draw Loss Postponed

Date Round	Home	Score	Away	Location

29 October 2013 1/16	Sanat Naft Abadan	1–0	Sepahan	Abadan
UTC+03:30				Stadium: Takhti Stadium

=== AFC Champions League ===
==== Group stage ====
Pos	Team	Pld	W	D	L	GF	GA	GD	Pts	Qualification
1	(Saudi Arabia) Al-Hilal	6	2	3	1	12	7	+5	9	Advance to knockout stage
2	(Qatar) Al-Sadd	6	2	2	2	8	14	−6	8	Advance to knockout stage
3	(United Arab Emirates) Al-Ahli	6	1	4	1	6	6	0	7	
4	(Iran) Sepahan	6	2	1	3	9	8	+1	7	

Date Round	Home	Score	Away	Location

26 February 2014 1	Al-Sadd (Qatar)	3–1	(Iran) Sepahan	Jassim Bin Hamad Stadium, Doha
18:30 UTC+3	Ibrahim 18'; Belhadj 87'; Tabata 90+2'	Report	Sharifi 78'	Attendance: 5,000; Referee: Minoru Tōjō (Japan)

12 March 2014 2	Sepahan (Iran)	3–2	(Saudi Arabia) Al-Hilal	Foolad Shahr Stadium, Fuladshahr
19:00 UTC+3:30	Bulku 18'; Sharifi 72'; Sukaj 90+1'	Report	Castillo 28'; Thiago Neves 33'	Attendance: 3,250; Referee: Ben Williams (Australia)

19 March 2014 3	Sepahan (Iran)	1–2	(United Arab Emirates) Al-Ahli	Foolad Shahr Stadium, Fuladshahr
19:00 UTC+3:30	Van Dijk 74'	Report	Khalil 39'; Al Hammadi 90+5'	Attendance: 6,800; Referee: Ko Hyung-jin (South Korea)

1 April 2014 4	Al-Ahli (United Arab Emirates)	0–0	(Iran) Sepahan	Al-Rashid Stadium, Dubai
20:20 UTC+4		Report		Attendance: 7,500; Referee: Ravshan Irmatov (Uzbekistan)

15 April 2014 5	Sepahan (Iran)	4–0	(Qatar) Al-Sadd	Foolad Shahr Stadium, Fuladshahr
20:30 UTC+4:30	Sharifi 48', 56'; Sukaj 63'; Majid 90+3' (o.g.)	Report		Attendance: 6,350; Referee: Kim Dong-jin (South Korea)

22 April 2014 6	Al-Hilal (Saudi Arabia)	1–0	(Iran) Sepahan	King Fahd International Stadium, Riyadh
20:50 UTC+3	Al-Shamrani 45+2'	Report		Attendance: 49,650; Referee: Yuichi Nishimura (Japan)

=== Friendly Matches ===
Win Draw Loss Postponed

Date Round	Home	Score	Away	Location

26 June 2013 1	Sarajevo (Bosnia and Herzegovina)	0–2	Sepahan	Murska Sobota, Slovenia
18:00 UTC+01:00		Report	Sharifi 38'; Jahan Alian 61'	Stadium: Murska Sobota Stadium

27 June 2013 2	Volyn Lutsk (Ukraine)	1–0	Sepahan	Murska Sobota, Slovenia
18:00 UTC+01:00	Bicfalvi 24'	Report		Stadium: Murska Sobota Stadium

29 June 2013 3	Dinamo Zagreb (Croatia)	2–0	Sepahan	Murska Sobota, Slovenia
18:00 UTC+01:00	Vrsaljko 36'; Halilović 85'	Report		Stadium: Murska Sobota Stadium

1 July 2013 4	RNK Split (Croatia)	1–0	Sepahan	Murska Sobota, Slovenia
18:00 UTC+01:00	Kvesić 30'	Report		Stadium: Murska Sobota Stadium

16 July 2013 5	Sepahan	1–1	Rah Ahan	Isfahan, Iran
20:00 UTC+03:30	Đalović	Report	Shiri	Stadium: Jaroukan Stadium; Attendance: 3,500

21 July 2013 6	Sepahan	4–1	Iranjavan Bushehr	Isfahan, Iran
20:00 UTC+03:30	Đalović; Gholami; Afshin; Karimi	Report	Gholamreza	Stadium: Jaroukan Stadium; Attendance: 3,000

26 August 2013 7	Giti Pasand	1–1	Sepahan	Isfahan, Iran
18:00 UTC+03:30	Amiri	Report	Sharifi	Stadium: Ararat Stadium; Attendance: 2,000

29 December 2013 8	Giti Pasand	2–2	Sepahan	Isfahan, Iran
15:00 UTC+03:30		Report	Ebrahimi; Pahlevan	Stadium: Ararat Stadium; Attendance: 1,000

== See also ==
- 2014 AFC Champions League
- 2013–14 Persian Gulf Cup
- 2013–14 Hazfi Cup
