= 2013 Hazfi Cup final =

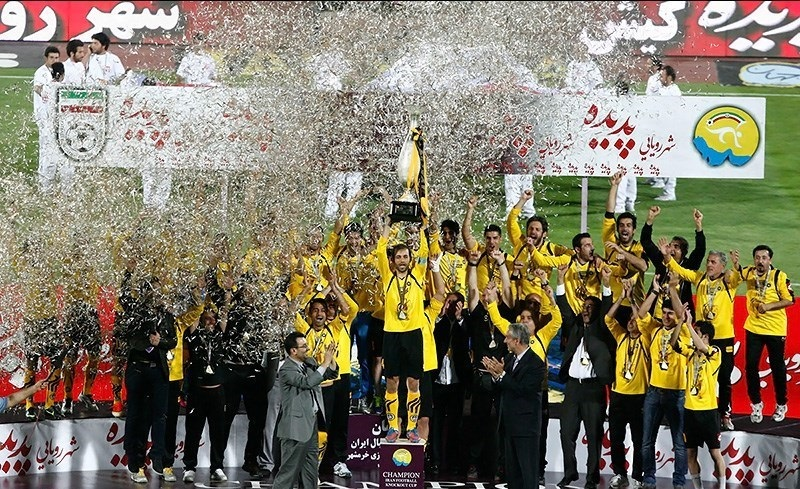
- Event: 2012–13 Hazfi Cup
Persepolis	Sepahan
2	2
- Sepahan won 4–2 on penalties
- Date: 5 May 2013
- Venue: Azadi Stadium, Tehran
- Man of the Match: Mohammad Reza Khalatbari
- Fans' Man of the Match: Omid Ebrahimi
- Referee: Alireza Faghani
- Attendance: 97,452
- Weather: Partly Cloudy; 22 °C (72 °F); 16% humidity

The 2013 Hazfi Cup final was the 26th final since 1975. The match was the Iran's El-classico between Persepolis and Sepahan. This was the clubs' second meeting in the final where Sepahan won 4–2 over Persepolis in the penalties in 2006. The match was also the last match of Persepolis captain Mehdi Mahdavikia, a former Iran national football team and Hamburg SV midfielder. Sepahan won Persepolis for another time in penalties and crowned their 4th domestic cup title. Sepahan was qualified for the group stage of the 2014 AFC Champions League.

== Format ==
The tie was contested over one legs, simply to last edition. If the teams could still not be separated, then extra time would have been played with a penalty shootout (taking place if the teams were still level after that).

== Road to the finals ==
Persepolis F.C.				Round	Sepahan S.C.
Opponent	Result	H/A	goalscorers	Second stage	Opponent	Result	H/A	goalscorers
Malavan	6–0	H	Hadi Norouzi 2', 50', Karim Ansarifard 19', 75', 80', Gholamreza Rezaei 83'	1/16 Final	Foolad	2–1	H	Mohammad Gholami 9', Mohammad Reza Khalatbari 85'
Naft Tehran	4–1	A	Mohammad Nouri 26', 58', Hossein Mahini 75', Hadi Norouzi 84'	1/8 Final	Mes Rafsanjan	1–0	A	Xhevahir Sukaj 109'
Zob Ahan	1–0	A	Mohammad Nouri 102'	Quarter-Final	Sanat Naft	2–0	H	Ervin Bulku 27', Farshid Talebi 61'
Damash	1–1 (5–3 p)	A	Mohammad Nouri 83'	Semi-Final	Esteghlal	1–1 (5–4 p)	A	Mohammad Reza Khalatbari 42'

=== Persepolis ===
Persepolis's head coach Manuel José de Jesus was sacked ten days before Persepolis' first match in domestic cup campaign and his assistant and former captain Yahya Golmohammadi was appointed as the caretaker head coach. Golmohammadi's first match in charge occurred on the Round of 32, which they faced Malavan, match ends 6–0, same with Persepolis' best win over Esteghlal in Tehran derby in 1973. Persepolis also defeated another Iran Pro League side, Naft Tehran with their technicians coach Mansour Ebrahimzadeh 4–1. Persepolis faced Zob Ahan in quarter-finals and won the match 1–0 with a late goal from Mohammad Nouri in extra time. Their match with Damash Gilan was also ends 1–1 after extra time and Persepolis won that match in the penalties.

=== Sepahan ===
Sepahan began their campaign with hosting Foolad in Isfahan. Foolad was eliminated Sepahan on the last edition at the same stadium but Sepahan won the match 2–1 with goals comes from Mohammad Gholami and Mohammad Reza Khalatbari and Luciano Pereira was foolad's scorer. On the Round of 16, Sepahan faced with second tier side, Mes Rafsanjan, match ends 1–0 for Sepahan after extra time. Sepahan also defeated Sanat Naft 2–0 and was qualified to semi-final to face with powerhouse Esteghlal. Esteghlal was defending champion and match was ends 1–1 after extra time and goes to penalties. Sepahan won 5–4 on penalties and qualified to their 4th final in last 10 years.

== Pre-match ==
=== Match history ===
Persepolis appeared in six Hazfi Cup Finals before this match. They won the cup in 1988, 1992, 1999, 2010 and 2011 and were runners-up in 2006. This was Sepahan's fourth appearance in a Hazfi Cup Final, having won in 2004, 2006 and 2007. The teams had met 50 times in the Iranian Football League. Persepolis won 17 times, Sepahan 12 times and the other 21 games were drawn.

=== Ticketing ===
Ticket prices for the final started at 2,000 toman and were also available at 5,000 and 10,000 with all of the incomes was awarded to a charitable foundation to spend for the people involved in Bushehr and Sistan earthquakes. The Cup winners received 50,000,000 from the IRIFF while the runners-up was earned 25,000,000 tomans.

=== Venue ===
Team officials met with each other on 1 April 2013 to decide on the final venue. After they failed to agree on a venue between Ghadir Stadium in Ahvaz, Samen Stadium in Mashhad and Sahand Stadium in Tabriz, the final venue was decided with a draw which 100,000 capacity Azadi Stadium (the Persepolis F.C. home Stadium) was announced as the venue for the 2013 final.

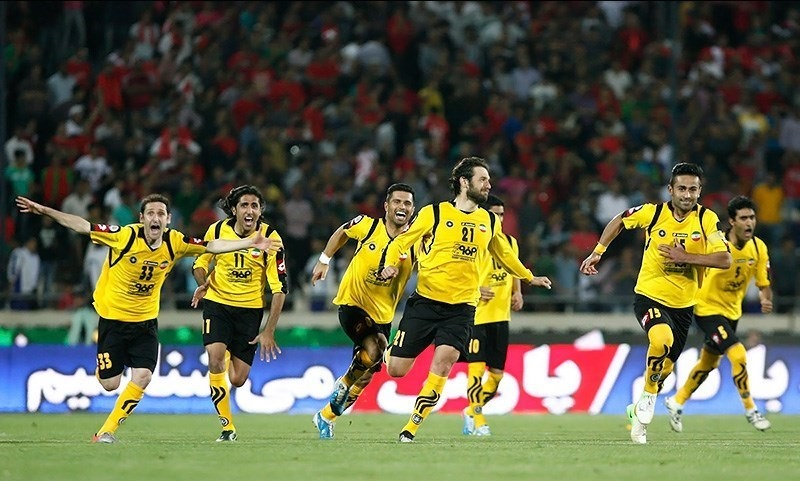
Sepahan players celebrating winning after penalties

=== Officials ===
FIFA listed referee, Alireza Faghani who also refereed the 2012 edition final was announced as the final match referee by IRIFF's referees committee. Hassan Kamranifar, the assistant referee of 2010 FIFA World Cup and Reza Sokhandan helped Faghani. Yadollah Soleimani was the fourth official.

=== Kit colors ===
Sepahan wore their yellow home kit for the Final. They also used the away dressing room.

== Details ==
5 May 2013
18:00 (UTC+4:30)

Persepolis	2 – 2 (a.e.t.)	Sepahan
Ansarifard 24'; Nouri 99'	Report	Sukaj 59'; Gholami 106'
Penalties
(penalty missed) Norouzi; (penalty scored) Mahini; (penalty missed) Haghighi; (penalty scored) Naghizadeh	2 – 4	(penalty scored) Bulku; (penalty scored) Khalatbari; (penalty scored) Ebrahimi; (penalty scored) Hajsafi

Azadi Stadium, Tehran
Attendance: 97,452
Referee: Alireza Faghani

Persepolis	Sepahan

Persepolis:
GK	40	(Brazil) Nilson Corrêa
RB	13	(Iran) Hossein Mahini	(yellow card) 120'
CB	4	(Iran) Jalal Hosseini
CB	6	(Iran) Mohsen Bengar
LB	23	(Iran) Amir Hossein Feshangchi
DM	33	(Iran) Reza Haghighi	(yellow card) 30'
RM	8	(Iran) Ali Karimi (c)		(substituted off) 84'
LM	39	(Iran) Adel Kolahkaj
AM	14	(Iran) Mohammad Nouri	(yellow card) 39'
SS	10	(Iran) Gholamreza Rezaei		(substituted off) 115'
CF	9	(Iran) Karim Ansarifard		(substituted off) 56'
Substitutes:
GK	22	(Iran) Reza Mohammadi
DF	20	(Iran) Alireza Noormohammadi
DF	30	(Iran) Mohammad Reza Khanzadeh
MF	2	(Iran) Mehdi Mahdavikia		(substituted in) 115'
MF	18	(Iran) Meysam Naghizadeh		(substituted in) 84'
MF	17	(North Macedonia) Vlatko Grozdanoski
FW	24	(Iran) Hadi Norouzi		(substituted in) 56'
Manager:
(Iran) Yahya Golmohammadi

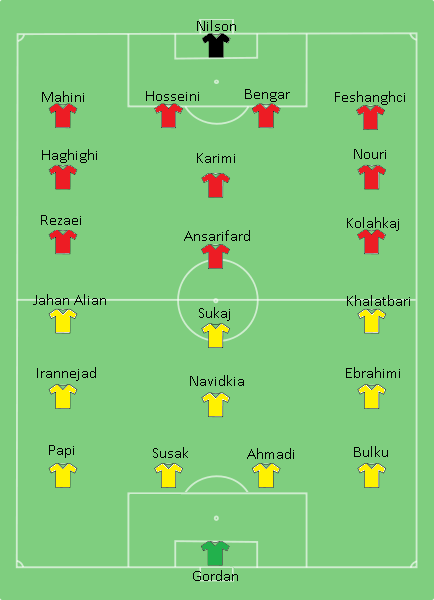

Sepahan:
GK	35	(Iran) Shahab Gordan
RB	38	(Albania) Ervin Bulku
CB	5	(Iran) Mohammad-Ali Ahmadi
CB	6	(Australia) Milan Susak
LB	11	(Iran) Mohsen Irannejad
DM	15	(Iran) Omid Ebrahimi	(yellow card) 101'
RM	23	(Iran) Amin Jahan Alian		(substituted off) 63'
LM	10	(Iran) Hossein Papi
AM	4	(Iran) Moharram Navidkia (c)		(substituted off) 81'
SS	33	(Iran) Mohammad Reza Khalatbari	(yellow card) 45'
CF	14	(Albania) Xhevahir Sukaj		(substituted off) 70'
Substitutes:
GK	1	(Iran) Mohammad-Bagher Sadeghi
DF	17	(Iran) Abolhassan Jafari
DF	18	(Iran) Mohammad Hossein Moradmand
MF	9	(Iran) Mehdi Jafarpour
MF	28	(Iran) Ehsan Hajsafi		(substituted in) 81'
FW	8	(Iran) Mohammad Gholami		(substituted in) 70'
FW	21	(Montenegro) Radomir Đalović		(substituted in) 63'
Manager:
(Croatia) Zlatko Kranjčar

Man of the match

- (Iran) Mohammad Reza Khalatbari (Sepahan)

Assistant referees:
Hassan Kamranifar
Reza Sokhandan
Fourth official:
Yadollah Soleimani

Match rules:

- 90 minutes
- 30 minutes of extra-time if necessary
- Penalty shoot-out if scores still level
- Seven named substitutes
- Maximum of three substitutions

=== Statistics ===
	Persepolis	Sepahan
Total shots	15	18
Shots on target	8	6
Ball possession	55%	45%
Corner kicks	5	5
Fouls committed	10	11
Offsides	3	0
Yellow cards	3	2
Red cards	0	0

Source: Varzesh3

== See also ==
- 2012–13 Persian Gulf Cup
- 2012–13 Azadegan League
- 2012–13 Iran Football's 2nd Division
- 2012–13 Iran Football's 3rd Division
- 2012–13 Hazfi Cup
- Iranian Super Cup
- 2012–13 Iranian Futsal Super League
