= Reza Mohammadi =

Iranian footballer

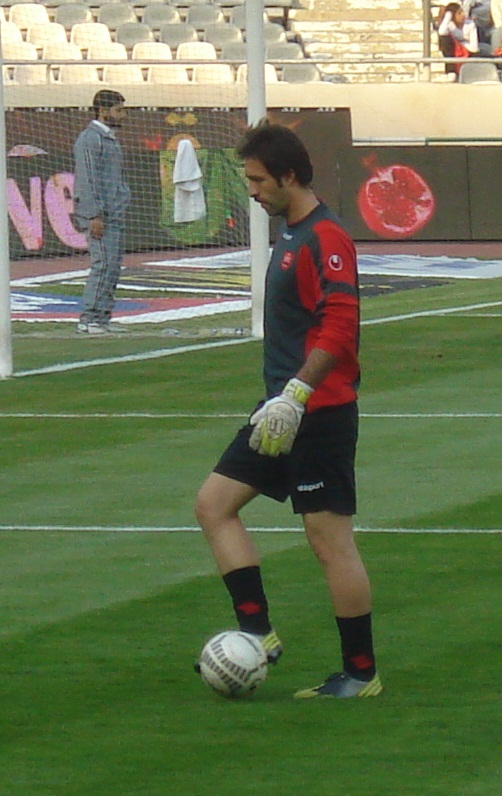

Personal information
- Date of birth: February 11, 1986 (age 40)
- Place of birth: Karaj, Iran
- Height: 1.90 m (6 ft 3 in)
- Position: Goalkeeper

Team information
- Current team: Damash Gilan
- Number: 1

Youth career
- 2003–2004: Shahab Zanjan

Senior career*
Years	Team	Apps	(Gls)
2004–2006	Shahab Zanjan	19	(0)
2006–2007	Moghavemat Sepasi	15	(0)
2007–2010	Paykan	18	(0)
2010–2011	Iranjavan	14	(0)
2011–2012	Sepahan	8	(0)
2012–2014	Persepolis	1	(0)
2014–2015	Naft Masjed Soleyman	10	(0)
2015–2016	Damash	26	(0)
- * Club domestic league appearances and goals as of 25 September 2015

Reza Mohammadi (Persian: رضا محمدی; born February 11, 1986) is an Iranian football goalkeeper who plays for Damash Gilan in the Azadegan League.

== Career ==
=== Early years ===
Mohammadi started his career at Shahab Zanjan. He would later join Moghavemat Sepasi and then Paykan. However, he didn't get much first team action and in the 2010–11 season he played for Iranjavan in the Azadegan League.

=== Sepahan ===
In July 2011, he joined Sepahan with a two-year contract. In the 2011–12 season, he played two times for Sepahan in 2011–12 Iran Pro League and once in the 2011 AFC Champions League. His best appearance for Sepahan was in the return-leg match against Al-Sadd in the Quarter-Finals of 2011 AFC Champions League.

=== Persepolis ===
He was transferred to Persepolis with a three-year contract as part of Shahab Gordan's contract with Sepahan. He played his first, and only match for Persepolis in the 2012–13 season final fixture against Tractor Sazi, which they lost 3–1.

=== Naft Masjed Soleyman ===
Mohammadi left Persepolis on 20 June 2014, after the club released him from his contract. He joined newly promoted Naft Masjed Soleyman on 23 June 2014 and played his first match against Saipa which he kept a clean sheet.

=== Club career statistics ===
As of 15 April 2016

Club	Division	Season	League		Hazfi Cup		Asia		Total	
Club	Division	Season	Apps	Goals	Apps	Goals	Apps	Goals	Apps	Goals
Iranjavan	Azadegan League	2010–11	14	0	0	0	–	–	14	0
Sepahan	Pro League	2011–12	2	0	0	0	1	0	3	0
Sepahan	Pro League	2012–13	6	0	0	0	2	0	8	0
Persepolis	Pro League	2012–13	1	0	0	0	–	–	1	0
Persepolis	Pro League	2013–14	0	0	0	0	–	–	0	0
Naft Masjed Soleyman	Pro League	2014–15	10	0	0	0	–	–	10	0
Damash Gilan	Azadegan League	2015–16	26	0	0	0	–	–	26	0
Career Total			59	0	0	0	3	0	62	0

== Honours ==
Sepahan

- Iran Pro League (1): 2011–12

Persepolis

- Iran Pro League: 2013–14 (Runner-up)
- Hazfi Cup: 2012–13 (Runner-up)
