= Ebrahim Abarghouei =

Iranian footballer

Personal information
- Full name: Ebrahim Abarghouei Nezhad
- Date of birth: 6 March 1985 (age 41)
- Place of birth: Shiraz, Iran
- Position: Defender

Youth career
- 2000–2002: Fajr Sepasi

Senior career*
Years	Team	Apps	(Gls)
2002–2007	Fajr Sepasi		
2007–2012	Shahrdari Tabriz		
2012–2013	Aluminium Hormozgan	22	(0)
2013–2014	Mes Kerman	5	(0)
2014	Aluminium Hormozgan	6	(0)
2014–2015	Naft Gachsaran	10	(0)
2015–2016	Bandar Abbas		
- * Club domestic league appearances and goals

Ebrahim Abarghouei Nezhad (born 6 March 1985) is an Iranian former footballer.

== Club career ==
Club performance			League		Cup		Continental		Total	
Season	Club	League	Apps	Goals	Apps	Goals	Apps	Goals	Apps	Goals
Iran			League		Hazfi Cup		Asia		Total	
2007–08	Shahrdari Tabriz	Azadegan	?	1			-	-		
2009–09	Shahrdari Tabriz	Azadegan	?	1			-	-		
2009–10	Shahrdari Tabriz	Azadegan	23	2	0	0	-	-	23	2
2010–11	Shahrdari Tabriz	Persian Gulf Cup	17	0	1	0	-	-	18	0
Total	Iran			4			0	0		
Career total				4			0	0		

- Assist Goals

Season	Team	Assists
2010–11	Shahrdari Tabriz	2
