= Mohammad Ghoreishi =

Iranian association football player

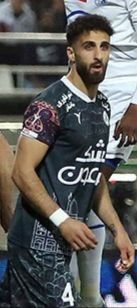

Personal information
- Full name: Seyyed Mohammad Ghoreishi
- Date of birth: February 13, 1995 (age 31)
- Place of birth: Babol, Iran
- Height: 1.83 m (6 ft 0 in)
- Position: Defender

Team information
- Current team: Foolad
- Number: 24

Youth career
- –2016: Khoneh Be Khoneh

Senior career*
Years	Team	Apps	(Gls)
2016–2018	Khoneh Be Khoneh	36	(1)
2018–2020	Sanat Naft	50	(2)
2020–2025	Zob Ahan	116	(3)
2025–	Foolad	25	(1)
- * Club domestic league appearances and goals

Mohammad Ghoreishi (Persian: محمد قریشی; born February 13, 1995) is an Iranian footballer who plays as a defender for Iranian club Foolad in the Persian Gulf Pro League.

== Club career ==
=== Sanat Naft ===
On 21 September 2018, he made his debut for Sanat Naft Abadan in a controversial match against Paykan that awarded 0 - 3 for Paykan by IFF decision.

=== Club career statistics ===
As of 26 October 2019.

Club	Division	Season	League		Hazfi Cup		Asia		Total	
Club	Division	Season	Apps	Goals	Apps	Goals	Apps	Goals	Apps	Goals
Khoneh Be Khoneh	Azadegan League	2015–16	2	0	0	0	–	–	2	0
Khoneh Be Khoneh	Azadegan League	2016–17	7	0	0	0	–	–	7	0
Khoneh Be Khoneh	Azadegan League	2017–18	29	1	4	0	–	–	33	1
Khoneh Be Khoneh	Total		38	1	4	0	0	0	42	1
Sanat Naft Abadan	Pro League	2018–19	20	0	0	0	0	0	20	0
Sanat Naft Abadan	Pro League	2019–20	30	2	2	0	0	0	32	2
Sanat Naft Abadan	Total		50	2	2	0	0	0	52	2
Zob Ahan	Persian Gulf Pro League	2020–21	9	0	1	0	–	–	10	0
Zob Ahan	Persian Gulf Pro League	2021–22	25	1	2	0	–	–	27	1
Zob Ahan	Persian Gulf Pro League	2022-23	27	0	1	0	0	0	28	0
Zob Ahan	Persian Gulf Pro League	2023-24	29	2	2	1	0	0	31	3
Zob Ahan	Total		90	3	6	1	0	0	96	4
Career totals			178	6	12	1	0	0	190	7
