= Adel Kolahkaj =

Iranian footballer

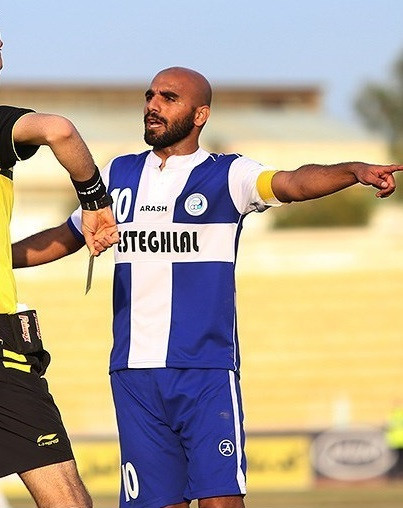
- Kolahkaj playing for Esteghlal Khuzestan

Personal information
- Full name: Adel Kolahkaj
- Date of birth: February 21, 1985 (age 41)
- Place of birth: Roudzard, Iran
- Height: 1.78 m (5 ft 10 in)
- Position: Midfielder

Youth career
- 2000–2003: Foolad

Senior career*
Years	Team	Apps	(Gls)
2003–2007	Foolad	85	(8)
2007–2009	Saba Battery	59	(4)
2009–2010	Persepolis	24	(1)
2010–2012	Mes Kerman	33	(0)
2012–2013	Sepahan	8	(1)
2013	Persepolis	9	(0)
2013–2014	Esteghlal Khuzestan	20	(2)
2014–2015	Rah Ahan	7	(1)
2015–2017	Esteghlal Ahvaz	26	(2)
2017-2018	Esteghlal Khuzestan	6	(1)
Total		277	(20)

International career
2001–2003	Iran U17	8	(2)
2003–2005	Iran U20	10	(1)
2006–2007	Iran U23	12	(3)
Medal record
Representing Iran
Asian Games
Bronze medal – third place	2006 Qatar	Team competition
- * Club domestic league appearances and goals as of 8 May 2016

Adel Kolahkaj (Persian: عادل کلاه‌کج, born February 21, 1985) is a retired Iranian footballer who last played for Esteghlal Khozestan and Perspolis among other clubs in Persian Gulf Pro League.

== Club career ==
He started his career in Foolad and won the league with the team and played in the 2006 AFC Champions League group stage. He moved to Saba after Foolad got relegated. He joined Sepahan in summer 2012. On 20 September 2012, Adel narrowly avoided injury when he picked up a small explosive device which had been thrown on the pitch during a match against Al-Ahli. He moved to Persepolis in June 2009. He joined Persepolis in December 2012. He signed a 2.5 year contract until end of 2015–16 season. On 28 May 2013, Persepolis coach Ali Daei did not let him train with the team and wanted him to join to another team. He joined Esteghlal Khuzestan on 1 July 2013, signed a one-year contract.

=== Club career statistics ===
As of 10 April 2014

Club performance			League		Cup		Continental		Total	
Season	Club	League	Apps	Goals	Apps	Goals	Apps	Goals	Apps	Goals
Iran			League		Hazfi Cup		Asia		Total	
2003–04	Foolad	Pro League	25	2	0	0	–		25	2
2004–05	Foolad	Pro League	16	2	0	0	–		16	2
2005–06	Foolad	Pro League	21	1	0	0	–		21	1
2006–07	Foolad	Pro League	23	3	1	0	6	0	30	3
2007–08	Saba	Pro League	31	3	2	0	–		33	3
2008–09	Saba	Pro League	28	1	4	1	5	0	37	2
2009–10	Persepolis	Pro League	24	1	4	0	–		28	1
2010–11	Mes	Pro League	8	0	0	0	–		8	0
2011–12	Mes	Pro League	25	0	0	0	–		25	0
2012–13	Sepahan	Pro League	8	1	0	0	2	0	10	1
2012–13	Persepolis	Pro League	9	0	2	0	–		8	0
2013–14	Esteghlal Khuzestan	Pro League	20	2	0	0	–		20	2
Career total			222	15	12	2	13	0	248	17

- Assist goals

Season	Team	Assists
06–07	Foolad	4
07–08	Saba	4
08–09	Saba	3
10–11	Mes Kerman	0
11–12	Mes Kerman	2
12–13	Sepahan	0
12–13	Persepolis	0
13–14	Esteghlal Khuzestan	3

== International career ==
He is a member of Iran national under-23 football team. participating in the 2006 Asian Games. In October 2006, He is known for taking free kicks, such as the one he scored against Saudi Arabia in Iran's 2–3 away match defeat.

== Honours ==
- Iran Pro League
  - Winner: 1
    - 2004–05 with Foolad
- Hazfi Cup
  - Winner: 1
    - 2009–10 with Persepolis
  - Runner-up: 1
    - 2012–13 with Persepolis

=== National ===
Iran U23

- Asian Games Bronze Medal: 2006
