= Mohammad Heidari =

Iranian footballer

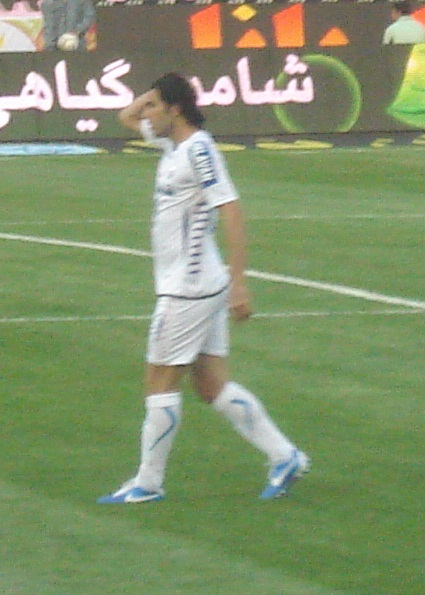

Personal information
- Date of birth: May 26, 1986 (age 40)
- Place of birth: Bandar Anzali, Iran
- Position: Striker

Team information
- Current team: Saba Qom
- Number: 44

Youth career
- 2000–2006: Malavan

Senior career*
| Years | Team | Apps | (Gls) |
| 2005–2013 | Malavan | 150 | (15) |
| 2013–2014 | Fajr Sepasi | 23 | (3) |
| 2015– | Saba Qom | 4 | (0) |
- * Club domestic league appearances and goals as of 15 May 2015

Mohammad Heidari (born May 26, 1986) is an Iranian footballer who plays for Saba Qom in the IPL.

== Club career ==
Heidari had played his entire career with Malavan, until he moved to Fajr Sepasi in the summer of 2013.

=== Club career statistics ===
| Club performance | | | League | | Cup | | Continental | | Total | |
| Season | Club | League | Apps | Goals | Apps | Goals | Apps | Goals | Apps | Goals |
| Iran | | | League | | Hazfi Cup | | Asia | | Total | |
|---|---|---|---|---|---|---|---|---|---|---|
| 2005–06 | Malavan | Pro League | 4 | 1 | | | - | - | | |
| 2006–07 | Malavan | Pro League | 23 | 1 | | | - | - | | |
| 2007–08 | Malavan | Pro League | 16 | 0 | 0 | 0 | - | - | 16 | 0 |
| 2008–09 | Malavan | Pro League | 16 | 6 | 1 | 1 | - | - | 17 | 7 |
| 2009–10 | Malavan | Pro League | 29 | 4 | 1 | 0 | - | - | 30 | 4 |
| 2010–11 | Malavan | Pro League | 19 | 1 | 5 | 0 | - | - | 24 | 1 |
| 2011–12 | Malavan | Pro League | 23 | 2 | 0 | 0 | - | - | 23 | 2 |
| 2012–13 | Malavan | Pro League | 20 | 0 | 0 | 0 | - | - | 20 | 0 |
| 2013–14 | Fajr Sepasi | Pro League | 23 | 3 | 0 | 0 | - | - | 23 | 3 |
| 2014–15 | Saba Qom | Pro League | 4 | 0 | 0 | 0 | - | - | 4 | 0 |
| Career total | | | 177 | 18 | | | 0 | 0 | | |

- Assist Goals

| Season | Team | Assists |
|---|---|---|
| 06/07 | Malavan | 1 |
| 07/08 | Malavan | 2 |
| 10/11 | Malavan | 1 |
| 11/12 | Malavan | 0 |
| 12/13 | Malavan | 3 |
| 13/14 | Fajr Sepasi | 1 |
