= Amin Jahan Alian =

Iranian footballer

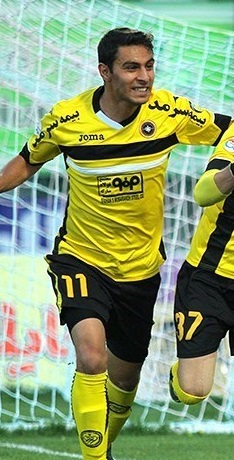
- Jahan Alian with Sepahan in 2016

Personal information
- Full name: Amin Jahan Alian
- Date of birth: 16 June 1991 (age 35)
- Place of birth: Isfahan, Iran
- Height: 1.74 m (5 ft 9 in)
- Positions: Winger; attacking midfielder

Youth career
- 2009–2012: Sepahan

Senior career*
Years	Team	Apps	(Gls)
2012–2018	Sepahan	43	(4)
2017	→ Aluminium Arak (loan)	10	(2)
2018–2019	Malavan		
2020-	Sepahan Novin		

International career
2013	Iran U22	3	(0)
- * Club domestic league appearances and goals as of 1 July 2019

Amin Jahan Alian (Persian: امین جهان عالیان, born 16 June 1991) is an Iranian footballer who plays as a winger or attacking midfielder.

== Club career ==
He joined Sepahan in the summer of 2012. From 2009 to 2012 he was a member of Sepahan under-21 football team.

=== Club career statistics ===
As of 12 July 2014

Club performance			League		Cup		Continental		Total	
Season	Club	League	Apps	Goals	Apps	Goals	Apps	Goals	Apps	Goals
2012–13	Sepahan	Iran Pro League	18	3	4	0	5	1	27	4
2013–14	Sepahan	Iran Pro League	15	1	1	0	0	0	16	1
2014–15	Sepahan	Iran Pro League	0	0	0	0	0	0	0	0
2017–18	Sepahan	Iran Pro League	0	0	0	0	0	0	0	0
Career total			23	4	4	0	5	1	32	5

== Honours ==
Sepahan

- Hazfi Cup: 2012–13
- Iran Pro League: 2014–15
