= Mohammad Gholami =

Iranian footballer

Mohammad Gholami Khalil-Mahalleh
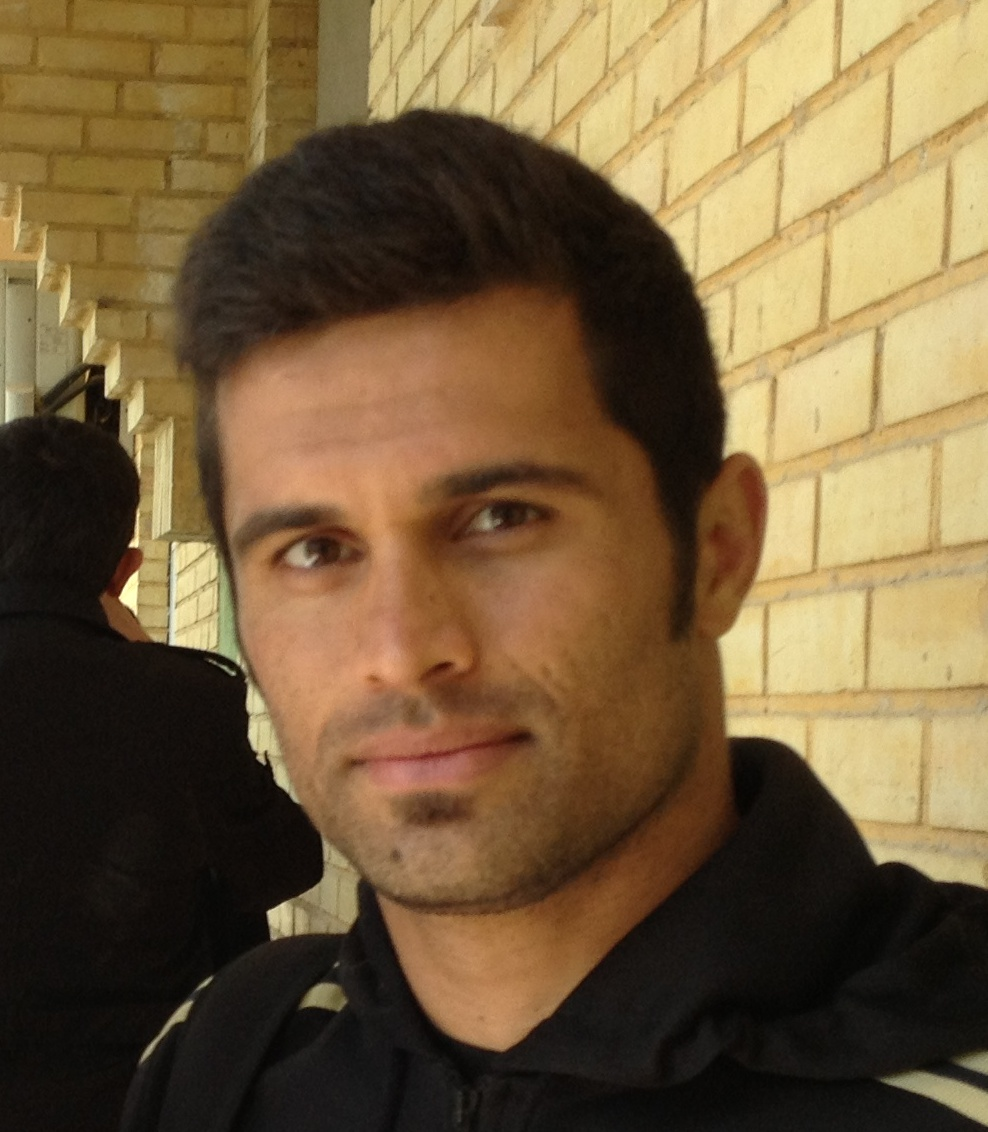
- Gholami in 2013 with Sepahan

Personal information
- Full name: Mohammad Gholami Khalil-Mahalleh
- Date of birth: 13 February 1983 (age 43)
- Place of birth: Talesh, Gilan, Iran
- Height: 1.79 m (5 ft 10 in)
- Position: Striker

Youth career
- Chooka Talesh

Senior career*
Years	Team	Apps	(Gls)
1999–2001	Chooka Talesh		
2001–2006	Malavan		
2006–2009	Pas	77	(19)
2009–2011	Steel Azin	59	(19)
2011–2012	Damash Gilan	29	(8)
2012–2014	Sepahan	51	(6)
2014–2015	Rah Ahan	13	(3)
2015	Padideh	11	(2)
2015–2016	Esteghlal Ahvaz	11	(2)
2016–2017	Khoneh Be Khoneh	20	(4)
2017–2018	Gol Gohar Sirjan	14	(4)
2018	Sepidrood	13	(2)
2018	Aluminium Arak	4	(0)
2018–2019	Sepidrood	22	(4)
2019	Qashqai	8	(1)
2019–2020	Damash	14	(6)
2020–2021	Sepidrood	20	(5)
2021–2022	Damash		

International career
2010–2013	Iran	13	(3)

Managerial career
- 2022: Chooka Talesh
- * Club domestic league appearances and goals

Mohammad Gholami (Persian: محمد غلامی; born 13 February 1983) is an Iranian football coach and a former player who usually played in the striker position.

== Club career ==
He began his professional career in Malavan football club. He showed consistent displays for Malavan throughout the 2005–06 Iran Pro League season, scoring 7 goals. Several times he saved the club from losing by scoring in the last seconds of the match. The most famous example of this is in the season where he shocked Esteghlal by scoring in the 94th minute in Azadi Stadium in a game that ended 3–3. He was signed to a one-year contract with Damash Gilan on 19 June 2011 and was one of Damash's key players in the 2011–12 season. He scored eight goals in 29 matches. After spending one season at Damash, he joined Iran Pro League champions, Sepahan on 1 June 2012 with a two-year contract.

In August 2022 he retired from his professional career after helping Damash to promote to Iranian football's 2nd division.

=== Club career statistics ===
As of 18 September 2014

Club performance			League		Cup		Continental		Total	
Season	Club	League	Apps	Goals	Apps	Goals	Apps	Goals	Apps	Goals
Iran			League		Hazfi Cup		Asia		Total	
2004–05	Malavan	Iran Pro League	9	0	0	0	–		9	0
2005–06	Malavan	Iran Pro League	21	7	0	0	–		21	7
2006–07	Pas Tehran	Iran Pro League	15	2	0	0	–		15	2
2007–08	Pas Hamedan	Iran Pro League	31	8	3	0	–		34	8
2008–09	Pas Hamedan	Iran Pro League	31	9	3	3	–		34	12
2009–10	Steel Azin	Iran Pro League	30	10	3	1	–		33	11
2010–11	Steel Azin	Iran Pro League	29	9	3	1	–		32	10
2011–12	Damash	Iran Pro League	29	8	2	0	–		31	8
2012–13	Sepahan	Iran Pro League	25	0	4	2	6	2	35	4
2013–14	Sepahan	Iran Pro League	26	6	1	0	0	0	27	6
2014–15	Rah Ahan	Iran Pro League	9	3	0	0	–		9	3
2014–15	Padideh	Iran Pro League	11	2	0	0	–		11	2
2015–16	Esteghlal Ahvaz	Iran Pro League	11	2	1	1	–		12	3
2016–17	Khooneh Be Khooneh	Azadegan League	20	4	0	0	–		20	4
2017–18	Sepidrood	Iran Pro League	13	2	0	0	–		14	4
2018–19	Sepidrood	Iran Pro League	22	4	1	1	–		17	5
Career total					21	9	6	2		

== International career ==
He made his international debut against China in September 2010 under Afshin Ghotbi, where he scored his first international goal.

=== International goals ===
Scores and results list Iran's goal tally first.

#	Date	Venue	Opponent	Score	Result	Competition
1	3 September 2010	Zhengzhou Hanghai Stadium	China	2–0	2–0	Friendly
2	1 October 2010	Amman International Stadium	Iraq	2–1	2–1	WAFF 2010
3	2 May 2012	Enghelab Stadium	Mozambique	1–0	3–0	Friendly

== Honours ==
Sepahan

- Hazfi Cup (1): 2012–13
