= Mohammad Ali Ahmadi =

Iranian professional football player

Personal information
- Full name: Mohammad Ali Ahmadi
- Date of birth: June 24, 1983 (age 43)
- Place of birth: Kerman, Iran
- Height: 1.88 m (6 ft 2 in)
- Positions: Centre back; right back

Youth career
- 2002–2006: Zob Ahan

Senior career*
Years	Team	Apps	(Gls)
2006–2012	Zob Ahan	124	(6)
2012–2016	Sepahan	64	(0)
2017	Padideh	4	(0)
2018	Sepahan	1	(0)
- * Club domestic league appearances and goals as of 16 February 2018 ‡ National team caps and goals as of 25 September 2010

Mohammad Ali Ahmadi (Persian: محمدعلی احمدی; born June 24, 1983) is an Iranian professional football player, who played for Sepahan in the Iran Pro League.

== Career ==
Ahmadi has played his entire career for Zob Ahan

- Last Update: 19 August 2014

Club performance			League		Cup		Continental		Total	
Season	Club	League	Apps	Goals	Apps	Goals	Apps	Goals	Apps	Goals
Iran			League		Hazfi Cup		Asia		Total	
2006–07	Zob Ahan	Iran Pro League	13	?		0	-	-		0
2007–08	Zob Ahan	Iran Pro League	29	?		0	-	-		0
2008–09	Zob Ahan	Iran Pro League	6	?		0	-	-		0
2009–10	Zob Ahan	Iran Pro League	22	?		0	0	0		0
2010–11	Zob Ahan	Iran Pro League	29	1	1	0	8	0	36	1
2011–12	Zob Ahan	Iran Pro League	25	1	0	0	1	0	26	1
2012–13	Sepahan	Iran Pro League	28	0	5	0	7	1	40	1
2013–14	Sepahan	Iran Pro League	20	0	1	0	3	0	24	0
2014–15	Sepahan	Iran Pro League	16	0	0	0	-	-	16	0
Total	Career total		158	?	6	0	16	1	180	?

== Honours ==
=== Club ===
Zob Ahan

- Hazfi Cup: 2008–09
- Iran Pro League Runner-up: 2008–09, 2009–10
- Asian Champions League Runner-up: 2010

Sepahan

- Iran Pro League (1): 2014–15
- Hazfi Cup: 2012–13

== External sources ==
- Profile at Persianleague
