= Xhevahir Sukaj =

Albanian footballer

Personal information
- Date of birth: 5 October 1987 (age 39)
- Place of birth: Shkodër, Albania
- Height: 1.84 m (6 ft 1/2 in)
- Position: Striker

Youth career
- 2002–2004: Vllaznia Shkodër

Senior career*
Years	Team	Apps	(Gls)
2004–2008	Vllaznia Shkodër	75	(19)
2005–2006	→ Elbasani (loan)	10	(0)
2008–2010	Gençlerbirliği	0	(0)
2008–2009	→ Hacettepe (loan)	11	(0)
2009	→ Vllaznia Shkodër (loan)	14	(11)
2009–2010	→ Orduspor (loan)	10	(2)
2010	→ Ismaily (loan)	3	(0)
2010–2011	NK Zagreb	5	(1)
2011–2012	Vllaznia Shkodër	20	(15)
2012–2015	Sepahan	70	(15)
2015–2016	Partizani Tirana	31	(21)
2016	Perak FA	4	(2)
2017	Partizani Tirana	16	(4)
2018	Vllaznia Shkodër	18	(8)
2018	Laçi	2	(0)
2019–2020	Flamurtari Vlorë	21	(4)
Total		310	(102)

International career
2005–2009	Albania U21	15	(5)
2008	Albania	1	(0)
- * Club domestic league appearances and goals

Xhevahir Sukaj (born 5 October 1987) is an Albanian former professional footballer who played as a striker.

He has played for Vllaznia Shkodër and Elbasani in Albania, Hacettepe and Orduspor in Turkey, Ismaily in Egypt, NK Zagreb in Croatia and most recently Sepahan in Iran.

== Club career ==
=== Early career ===
Sukaj is a product of the Vllaznia academy and in 2004 he was promoted to the first team at the age of just 16. The 2004–05 season was his first in professional football and he made 15 league appearances scoring 1 goal along the way helping Vllaznia finish 4th in the table. In the Albanian Cup, Sukaj managed to grab 2 goals in the 8–0 thrashing of Tërbuni Pukë in the 2nd round of the cup. Vllaznia reached the semi-finals that season but were eventually knocked out by Tirana after a 3–2 aggregate loss.

He was then loaned out to Elbasani for the 2005–06 season in order to gain some more first team experience, but Sukaj found it difficult to compete with the more experienced strikers at the club and only managed to feature in 4 league games without scoring, but he did win the Albanian Superliga that season with Elbasani. He reached the Albanian Cup semi-finals again but did not score in any game during his loan.

Sukaj returned to Vllaznia in 2006 and immediately established himself in the first team and was instrumental in helping Vllaznia finish 3rd in the league with 8 goals in 31 games. He also scored 3 goals in the cup where Vllaznia were narrowly knocked out in the quarter-finals through the away goal rule against Partizani Tirana. Overall, he scored 11 goals in the 2006–07 season.

During the 2007–08 season Vllaznia played in the Intertoto Cup where Sukaj made his first European appearance in the return leg of the 1st round against NK Zagreb, but after wasting chances he was substituted by the coach Mirel Josa for Vioresin Sinani in the 69th minute. Vllaznia were then drawn against Turkish club Trabzonspor in the next round where Vllaznia were beaten 10–0 on aggregate, with Sukaj only playing the first leg, as he was dropped to the bench by Josa for the return leg. In the league Vllaznia had a difficult season finishing only 7th, despite Sukaj scoring 10 goals in 28 games. His side did however manage to win the Albanian Cup with the help of 3 goals by Sukaj, including the winning goal in the final against KF Tirana. His goal tally reached 13 for the 2007–08 season and he won his first trophy with Vllaznia.

In the 2008–09 UEFA Cup qualification Sukaj scored 2 away goals against Slovenian side NK Koper in the first half of the 2–1 win. His goals put Vllaznia through to the second round as the 2nd leg finished goal less and his side were drawn against Italian giants Napoli. Sukaj's double in Slovenia earned his team their first win the competition in their 7 games played and Sukaj gained the record of becoming the first ever Vllaznia player to score more than one goal in a European game. He played his last game for the club before moving abroad in the first leg of the next round against Napoli, where Vllaznia were outclassed and beaten 3–0 at home.

=== Gençlerbirliği ===
His departure from Vllaznia Shkodër was announced on 4 August 2008. The club who actually secured his signature was Gençlerbirliği, who are the parent club of Hacettepe. He was loaned to Hacettepe, until the end of the season. After being unable to break into the first team he was loaned back to his homeland of Albania. He only started 2 games, but made other appearances off the bench.

Vllaznia Shkodër

On his first match back he was able to get a hat-trick in the match against Besa Kavajë, helping the team to win the match 4–1. In the other 14 matches that season he scored another 7 goals.

Orduspor

After an uneventful spell in Turkish top flight, Sukaj joined fellow Turkish side Orduspor by signing a two-year contract. He made his club debut on 30 August by appearing as a second-half substitute in the 2–0 home defeat to Altay. Two goals in nine appearances were not enough to impress the club directors, who terminated his contract in January 2010.

Ismaily

In January 2010, Sukaj signed a contract with Ismaily for the second part of 2009–10 season.

=== NK Zagreb ===
Sukaj signed a three-year contract with Croatian side NK Zagreb on 15 July 2010, after it was widely believed that he would join Vllaznia once again. He only made five league appearances and scored one goal before terminating his contract in January.

=== Vllaznia Shkodër ===
Sukaj returned to his first club Vllaznia Shkodër by signing a two-year contract in June 2013. On the opening day of the 2011–12 Albanian Superliga, he scored a hat-trick against Laçi to secure a win for his side, despite Vllaznia trailing the game after 43 minutes. Sukaj's goals came in the 73rd, 80th and 92nd minute of the game.

=== Sepahan ===
In January 2012, Sukaj completed his transfer to Iran Pro League side Sepahan by signing an 18-month deal. During the second part of 2011–12 season, he managed to score only two goals in ten appearances.

Sukaj won his third trophy with Sepahan in May 2015 after his club secured the league title in the very last week after beating 2–0 Saipa, where Sukaj featured in the last 14 minutes. After the end of the season, the club's directors decided not to renew his contract, leaving him as a free agent.

=== Partizani Tirana ===
He returned to Albania in the summer of 2015 and after being linked with a host of Albanian Superliga sides including his former club Vllaznia Shkodër he signed a one-year contract with Partizani Tirana on 21 July. In the opening match of 2015–16 Albanian Superliga against Laçi at Qemal Stafa Stadium, Sukaj scored a goal with free-kick in the 64th minute to secure his side one point.

Sukaj was one of the top form players in the league as he scored a goal in each of his first seven matches for the team. For his performances, he was awarded Albanian Superliga Player of the Month for October 2015. After that, he suffered a goal drought as only netted once after 17 October 2015, which was against Tërbuni Pukë on 2 December 2015.

On 19 December 2015, he immediately got sent off against Skënderbeu Korçë for an altercation with Renato Arapi only seconds after coming into the pitch. It was his first ever red card career. He was banned for 5 matches by the Disciplinary Committee of AFA.

He played his first match in 2016, coming off the bench to score in the 89th minute against Flamurtari Vlorë on 6 February 2016. With 21 league goals, Sukaj was the second highest scorer in the Albanian Superliga for the 2015–16 season, only six goals behind Golden Boot winner Hamdi Salihi.

On 21 June 2016, Sukaj signed a new contract with Partizani Tirana, keeping him at the club until 2017. However, he announced his departure from the club eight days later after being told that he was not on the new coach's plans for the new season.

=== Perak FA ===
On 28 June 2016, Sukaj joined Malaysia Super League club Perak FA on an 18-month contract, worth $500,000 per season. He made his competitive debut with the team in the matchday 14 against FELDA United on 16 July, playing 83 minutes in a 1–1 away draw. Three days later, Sukaj opened his scoring account in a Malaysian Cup Group C match against PDRM, which ended in a 2–1 home defeat. Then he scored his first goals in the league in his third appearance, netting a brace in a 2–1 win at Pahang. Four days later, during the next cup match against Johor Darul Ta'zim in which Sukaj opened the score in the 12th minute, he suffered a major injury which forced him to leave the match.

=== Partizani Tirana return ===
Following his departure from Perak, Sukaj returned to Partizani Tirana in January 2017 to train with the squad in order to maintain his form. On 5 January, sporting director Genc Tomorri stated that Sukaj will be part of the team. The transfer was made official on 30 January with the player signing until the end of the season. Due to injury, Sukaj missed February and half of March. He made his return debut later on 18 March by entering as a second-half substitute for Realdo Fili in a 2–0 win over Korabi Peshkopi. His first score-sheet contributions came on 23 April in the matchday 30 against Teuta Durrës where he scored in the last moments to seal the win 5–1. Sukaj was again decisive for the team five days later where he entered as a substitute against the city rivals Tirana, netting a late header for a 2–1 win which kept Partizani's title hopes alive. It was his fourth Tirana derby goal. Sukaj finished the second part of 2016–17 season by making 8 appearances, all of them as substitute, collecting 131 minutes as Partizani failed to win the championship once again, finishing runner-up to Kukësi. On 17 June 2017, Sukaj signed a new one-year contract.

Sukaj continued his cooperation with Partizani for another season, and despite suffering an injury in June, he was still included in the team for the 2017–18 UEFA Europa League first qualifying round against Botev Plovdiv. He started in the first leg at Selman Stërmasi Stadium on 29 June, netting inside 4 minutes with a shoot outside the zone in an eventual 1–3 loss. Then he played in the final 9 minutes in the second leg as Partizani lost 0–1 and was eliminated from the competition.

Sukaj chances to play were reduced under new manager Mark Iuliano, as the Italian preferred the 4–3–3 lineup with one center-forward, meaning that Sukaj would make space to newly acquired Edgar Çani. Even with the injury of Çani, Sukaj was forced to make space for the youngster Bardhi. He scored his first domestic goal of the season on 12 October at Teuta Durrës, netting a penalty kick to give his side the first league win of 2017–18 season. Sukaj found the net again four days later where he scored the opener in a 2–0 home win versus Luftëtari Gjirokastër; he was however replaced in the 60th minute due to an injury. Following the examinations, it was confirmed that Sukaj would be sidelined for 1 month.

He returned on action a month later as a late substitute in a 0–1 loss at Laçi. Sukaj returned to the score-sheet after more than a month on 30 November where he netted the lone goal in the match versus Pogradeci valid for the first leg of 2017–18 Albanian Cup second round. Sukaj left the club in late December due to limited playing time.

=== Vllaznia Shkodër return ===
On 5 January 2018, Vllaznia Shkodër announced to have acquired Sukaj's services on a contract until May 2018. Upon signing the contract, he flew out to Ulqin to link up with the rest of the squad on their winter training camp. His first goals came on 10 February in form of a brace in the 0–2 win at Abdurrahman Roza Haxhiu Stadium versus the fellow relegation strugglers Lushnja. Sukaj ended the second part of the season by scoring 8 goals in 18 appearances, a respectable amount which was not enough for Vllaznia who was relegated for the first time in 60 years.

=== Flamurtari Vlorë ===
On 29 January 2019, Sukaj joined Flamurtari Vlorë.

== International career ==
Sukaj was well established in the Albania under-21 team during the 2009 UEFA European Under-21 Championship qualification campaign. On 17 November 2007, he scored a hat-trick in Albania 5–0 defeat of Faroe Islands which marked the Eagles largest win in a UEFA European Championship qualifying match. He eventually finished the campaign by bagging 5 goals in 10 matches as Albania finished Group 1 in 4th place.

After enjoying a successful under-21 career, Sukaj was called up by then coach Arie Haan for the friendly against Azerbaijan in Baku on 19 November 2008. He made his senior debut in this match by appearing as a substitute in the last minutes of the match, which finished in a 1–1 draw.

== Career statistics ==
=== Club ===
As of 23 May 2018

Club statistics
Club	Season	League			Cup		Continental		Total	
Club	Season	Division	Apps	Goals	Apps	Goals	Apps	Goals	Apps	Goals
Vllaznia Shkodër	2004–05	Albanian Superliga	15	1	2	2	—		17	3
Vllaznia Shkodër	2006–07	Albanian Superliga	31	8	0	0	—		31	8
Vllaznia Shkodër	2007–08	Albanian Superliga	28	10	0	0	2 (Note: All appearance(s) in UEFA Intertoto Cup)	0	30	10
Vllaznia Shkodër	2008–09	Albanian Superliga	0	0	0	0	3 (Note: All appearance(s) in UEFA Europa League)	2	3	2
Vllaznia Shkodër	Total		75	19	2	2	5	2	82	23
Elbasani (loan)	2005–06	Albanian Superliga	4	0	0	0	—		4	0
Gençlerbirliği	2008–09	Süper Lig	0	0	0	0	—		0	0
Hacettepe (loan)	2008–09	Süper Lig	11	0	1	0	—		12	0
Vllaznia Shkodër (loan)	2008–09	Albanian Superliga	14	11	0	0	—		14	11
Orduspor (loan)	2009–10	TFF First League	10	2	1	1	—		11	3
Ismaily (loan)	2009–10	Egyptian Premier League	3	0	2	0	—		5	0
NK Zagreb	2010–11	Prva HNL	5	1	0	0	—		5	1
Vllaznia Shkodër	2010–11	Albanian Superliga	11	6	4	0	—		15	6
Vllaznia Shkodër	2011–12	Albanian Superliga	9	9	2	2	4	2	15	13
Vllaznia Shkodër	Total		20	15	6	2	4	2	30	19
Sepahan	2011–12	Iran Pro League	10	2	0	0	8 (Note: All appearance(s) in AFC Champions League)	2	18	4
Sepahan	2012–13	Iran Pro League	32	11	0	0	5	3	37	14
Sepahan	2013–14	Iran Pro League	7	0	0	0	6	2	13	2
Sepahan	2014–15	Iran Pro League	21	2	0	0	0	0	21	2
Sepahan	Total		70	15	0	0	19	7	89	22
Partizani Tirana	2015–16	Albanian Superliga	31	21	1	1	—		32	22
Perak	2016	Malaysia Super League	4	2	2	2	—		6	4
Partizani Tirana	2016–17	Albanian Superliga	8	2	0	0	—		8	2
Partizani Tirana	2017–18	Albanian Superliga	10	2	1	1	2	1	13	4
Partizani Tirana	Total		18	4	1	1	2	1	21	6
Vllaznia Shkodër	2017–18	Albanian Superliga	18	8	—		—		18	8
Career total			280	97	16	9	30	12	326	118

=== International ===
As of 19 November 2008

Appearances and goals by national team and year
National team	Year	Apps	Goals
Albania	2008	1	0
Total		1	0

== Honours ==
=== Club ===
Elbasani

- Albanian Superliga: 2005–06

Vllaznia Shkodër

- Albanian Cup: 2007–08

Sepahan

- Iran Pro League: 2011–12, 2014–15
- Hazfi Cup: 2012–13

=== Individual ===
- Albanian Superliga Player of the Month: October 2015
