= Farshid Talebi =

Iranian footballer

Personal information
- Date of birth: 24 August 1981 (age 45)
- Place of birth: Shiraz, Iran
- Height: 1.89 m (6 ft 2 1/2 in)
- Position: Defender

Youth career
- 2002–2003: Fajr Sepasi

Senior career*
Years	Team	Apps	(Gls)
2002–2006	Fajr Sepasi	81	(11)
2006–2012	Zob Ahan	138	(12)
2012–2013	Sepahan	29	(3)
2013–2014	Tractor Sazi	15	(0)

International career^{‡}
2009–2011	Iran	2	(0)
- * Club domestic league appearances and goals as of 17:08, 24 December 2013 (UTC) ‡ National team caps and goals as of 15:51, 19 January 2011 (UTC)

Farshid Talebi with the name of Sports Farshid Talebi (Persian: فرشید طالبی; born 24 August 1981) is an Iranian singer and retired professional football player.

== Club career ==
He served most his career in Zob Ahan and played six seasons at the club. He was in the List of the candidates for 2010 Asian Player of the Year nominees, and then made it to the final five nominees for the coveted award but award was given to Saša Ognenovski. In 2012, he joined Sepahan with a three years contract but his contract was terminated on 1 July 2013. He moved to Tractor Sazi with a one-year contract.

=== Club career statistics ===
- Last update: 14 July 2014

Club performance			League		Cup		Continental		Total	
Season	Club	League	Apps	Goals	Apps	Goals	Apps	Goals	Apps	Goals
Iran			League		Hazfi Cup		Asia		Total	
2002–03	Fajr	Iran Pro League	21	3	0	0	–		21	3
2003–04	Fajr	Iran Pro League	19	0	2	0	–		19	0
2004–05	Fajr	Iran Pro League	23	7	1	0	–		23	7
2005–06	Fajr	Iran Pro League	18	1	0	0	–		18	1
2006–07	Zob Ahan	Iran Pro League	11	2	0	0	–		11	2
2007–08	Zob Ahan	Iran Pro League	18	0	2	0	–		20	0
2008–09	Zob Ahan	Iran Pro League	25	2	4	0	–		29	2
2009–10	Zob Ahan	Iran Pro League	26	4	1	0	11	0	38	4
2010–11	Zob Ahan	Iran Pro League	32	2	0	0	9	0	28	0
2011–12	Zob Ahan	Iran Pro League	26	2	1	0	1	0	28	1
2012–13	Sepahan	Iran Pro League	29	3	4	1	7	2	40	6
2013–14	Tractor Sazi	Iran Pro League	15	0	2	1	0	0	17	1
Career total			263	26	17	2	28	2	308	30

- Assist Goals

Season	Team	Assists
09–10	Zob Ahan	1
10–11	Zob Ahan	1
11–12	Zob Ahan	1
12–13	Sepahan	0
13–14	Tractor Sazi	2

== International career ==
In June 2009, Talebi was invited under Afshin Ghotbi for three matches in 2010 World Cup qualifying, but did not play in any of them.

== Honours ==
=== Club ===
Zob Ahan

- Asian Champions League
  - Runner-up (1): 2010
- Iran Pro League
  - Runner up (2): 2008–09, 2009–10
- Hazfi Cup (1): 2008–09

Sepahan

- Hazfi Cup (1): 2012–13

Tractor Sazi

- Hazfi Cup (1): 2013–14
