= Mohsen Irannejad =

Iranian footballer

Mohsen Irannezhad
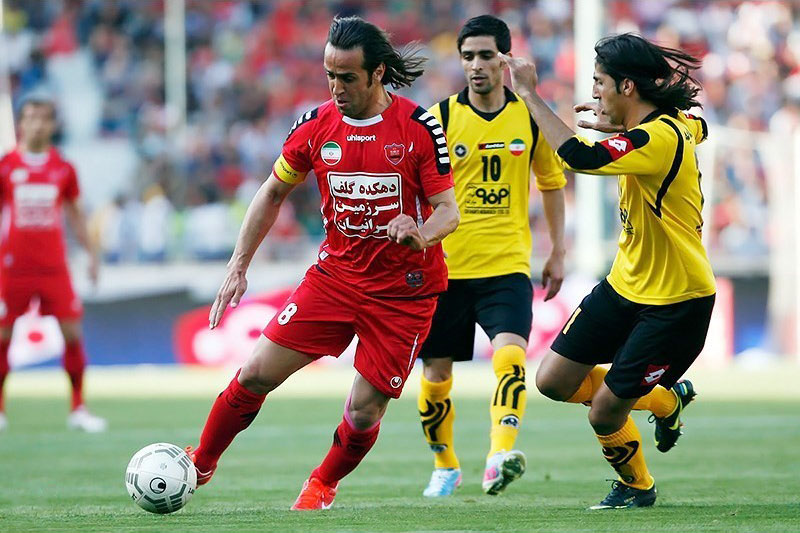
- Ali Karimi (left) vs Mohsen Irannejad

Personal information
- Full name: Mohsen Irannejad
- Date of birth: 15 July 1985 (age 41)
- Place of birth: Iran
- Height: 1.88 m (6 ft 2 in)
- Position: Left back

Youth career
- Gol Gohar U21

Senior career*
Years	Team	Apps	(Gls)
2007–2009	Gol Gohar	56	(3)
2009–2012	Shahin Bushehr	79	(2)
2012–2014	Sepahan	19	(0)
2014	→ Zob Ahan (loan)	15	(0)
2014–2017	Rah Ahan	35	(0)
2017–2018	Oxin Alborz	18	(0)
2018	Sepidrood Rasht	2	(0)
2019–2021	Arman Gohar Sirjan F.C.	44	(1)

Managerial career
- 2021-2023: Gol Gohar U21
- 2023-2024: Bahman Javan
- 2024-2025: Foolad Hormozgan
- * Club domestic league appearances and goals as of 27 August 2025

Mohsen Irannezhad (Persian: محسن ایرانژاد; born 15 July 1985) is an Iranian former footballer.

== Youth career ==
Irannezhad started his career with Gol Gohar U21 before making his debut with the senior team in 2007.

== Club career ==
Irannezhad joined Shahin Bushehr in 2009 after spending the previous two seasons at Gol Gohar. He signed a three-year contract with Sepahan on 2 June 2012. He was loaned to another Isfahani based side, Zob Ahan, in December 2013. After the end of the season, he was released by Sepahan and joined Rah Ahan on 1 July 2014, and signed a two-year contract. Following the expiration of his contract, he returned to his first club, Gol Gohar, and would remain for one season before transferring to Oxin Alborz. After one season with Alborz, Irannezhad transferred to Sepidrood, where he would once again stay for just one season, afterwards leaving for Arman Gohar where he would play the last two seasons of his career before retiring.

== Managerial career ==
After retiring, Irannezhad returned to Gol Gohar as their Academy Manager. He held this position from April 2021 until June 2023, followed his appointment as manager of Bahman Javan. He was removed from this post in June 2024 and was quickly hired by Foolad Hormozgan. He was sacked on 7 April 2025.

=== Club career statistics ===
As of 27 August 2025

Club performance			League		Cup		Continental		Total	
Season	Club	League	Apps	Goals	Apps	Goals	Apps	Goals	Apps	Goals
Iran			League		Hazfi Cup		Asia		Total	
2007–08	Gol Gohar	Azadegan League	15	1			-	-		
2008–09	Gol Gohar	Azadegan League	?	2			-	-		
2009–10	Shahin	Persian Gulf Pro League	33	0			-	-		
2010–11	Shahin	Persian Gulf Pro League	16	0	2	0	-	-	18	0
2011–12	Shahin	Persian Gulf Pro League	30	0	4	0	-	-	34	0
2012–13	Sepahan	Persian Gulf Pro League	15	0	4	0	5	0	24	0
2013–14	Sepahan	Persian Gulf Pro League	3	0	1	0	0	0	4	0
2013–14	Zob Ahan	Persian Gulf Pro League	12	0	0	0	-	-	12	0
2014–15	Rah Ahan	Persian Gulf Pro League	2	0	0	0	-	-	2	0
2015-2016	Rah Ahan	Persian Gulf Pro League	7	0	2	1	-	-	9	1
2016-2017	Gol Gohar	Azadegan League	13	0	-		-		12	0
2017-2018	Oxin Alborz	Azadegan League	18	0	2	0			20	0
2018-2019	Sepidrood Rasht	Persian Gulf Pro League	2	0	-		-		12	0
2018-2019	Arman Gohar	League 2	10	1	-		-		12	0
2019-2020	Arman Gohar	Azadegan League	26	0	-		-		26	0
2020-2021	Arman Gohar	Azadegan League	8	0	-		-		8	0
Total	Career total		109	3	11	0	5	0	125	3

== Honours ==
=== Club ===
- Hazfi Cup
  - Winner: 1
    - 2012–13 with Sepahan
  - Runner up: 1
    - 2011–12 with Shahin Bushehr
