= Shahab Gordan =

Iranian footballer (born 1984)

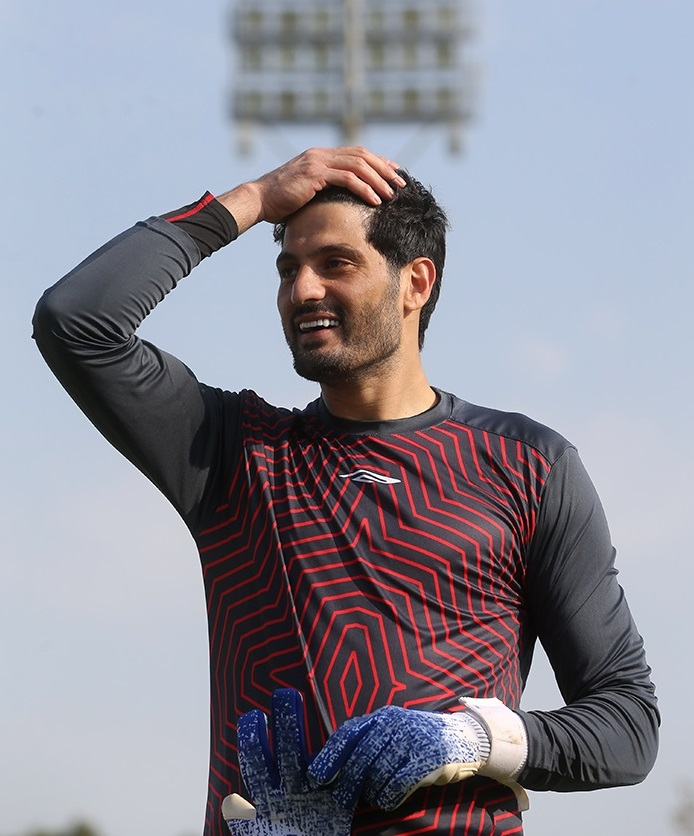
- Gordan with Zob Ahan in 2020

Personal information
- Full name: Shahabeddin Gordan
- Date of birth: 22 May 1984 (age 42)
- Place of birth: Juybar, Mazandaran, Iran
- Height: 1.93 m (6 ft 4 in)
- Position: Goalkeeper

Youth career
- 2003–2004: Nassaji

Senior career*
Years	Team	Apps	(Gls)
2004–2005	Nassaji		
2005–2009	Aboomoslem	58	(0)
2009–2012	Zob Ahan	85	(0)
2012–2013	Persepolis	5	(0)
2013–2016	Sepahan	48	(0)
2016–2018	Padideh	33	(0)
2018–2019	Sanat Naft	27	(0)
2019–2020	Foolad	26	(0)
2020–2022	Zob Ahan	16	(0)
2022–2024	Foolad	22	(0)

International career
2010–2013	Iran	4	(0)
- * Club domestic league appearances and goals

Shahabeddin Gordan (Persian: شهاب گردان, born 22 May 1984) is an Iranian former football goalkeeper.

== Club career ==
Shahab Gordan joined Zob Ahan in 2009 after spending his entire career with F.C. Aboomoslem. Since he joined Zob Ahan, he has been first-choice goalkeeper, he played almost every match in the IPL, and his performance helped to secure 2nd place on the 2009–10 IPL. Shahab Gordan also played every match in the 2010 Asian Champions League and made very important saves to lead Zob Ahan to the ACL final, including saving a penalty from Christian Wilhelmsson, against Saudi power-house Al-Hilal in the semi-finals. He signed a one-year contract with Persepolis in 2012. In the end of the 2012 season, Shahab signed with Iranian champions Sepahan, as he only played 5 games while representing Persepolis.

=== Club career statistics ===
As of 22 October 2016

Club performance			League		Cup		Continental		Total	
Season	Club	League	Apps	Goals	Apps	Goals	Apps	Goals	Apps	Goals
Iran			League		Hazfi Cup		Asia		Total	
2005–06	Aboomoslem	Pro League	1	0	0	0	–	–	1	0
2006–07	Aboomoslem	Pro League	15	0	0	0	–	–	15	0
2007–08	Aboomoslem	Pro League	22	0	2	0	–	–	24	0
2008–09	Aboomoslem	Pro League	20	0	1	0	–	–	21	0
Total			58	0	3	0	0	0	61	0
2009–10	Zob Ahan	Persian Gulf Pro League	27	0	1	0	12	0	40	0
2010–11	Zob Ahan	Persian Gulf Pro League	33	0	6	0	8	0	47	0
2011–12	Zob Ahan	Persian Gulf Pro League	25	0	0	0	0	0	25	0
Total			85	0	7	0	20	0	112	0
2012–13	Persepolis	Persian Gulf Pro League	5	0	0	0	–	–	5	0
2012-13	Sepahan	Persian Gulf Pro League	17	0	3	0	5	0	25	0
2013–14	Sepahan	Persian Gulf Pro League	3	0	0	0	3	0	6	0
2014–15	Sepahan	Persian Gulf Pro League	17	0	1	0	-	-	18	0
2015–16	Sepahan	Persian Gulf Pro League	11	0	0	0	3	0	14	0
Total			48	0	4	0	11	0	63	0
2016–17	Padideh	Persian Gulf Pro League	18	0	1	0	–	–	19	0
2017–18	Padideh	Persian Gulf Pro League	15	0	1	0	–	–	16	0
Total			33	0	2	0	0	0	35	0
2018–19	Sanat Naft	Persian Gulf Pro League	27	0	2	0	–	–	29	0
2019–20	Foulad	Persian Gulf Pro League	26	0	0	0	–	–	26	0
2020–21	Zob Ahan	Persian Gulf Pro League	23	0	1	0	–	–	24	0
2021-22	Foolad	Persian Gulf Pro League	14	0	0	0	6	0	20	0
2022-23	Foolad	Persian Gulf Pro League	2	0	1	0	0	0	3	0
2023-24	Foolad	Persian Gulf Pro League	6	0	0	0	0	0	6	0
Total			22	0	1	0	6	0	29	0
Career total			327	0	20	0	37	0	384	0

== International career ==
Shahab Gordan's recent performances while in Zob Ahan goal, impressed many Team Melli fans, which made Iran national team coach Afshin Ghotbi calling him to the national team. Shahab is a member of the Iran national team. He made his debut on 19 January 2011, in a 2011 AFC Asian Cup match against United Arab Emirates. He was one of the 23 players in the Iran national team in the 2011 AFC Asian Cup. He is usually second choice goalkeeper behind Mehdi Rahmati.

== Honours ==
Zob Ahan

- Iran Pro League Runner-up: 2009–10
- AFC Champions League Runner-up: 2010

Sepahan

- Iran Pro League (1): 2014–15
- Hazfi Cup (1): 2012–13
