= 2007–08 Sepahan F.C. season =

Sepahan
2007–08 season
- Chairman: Mohammad Reza Saket
- Manager: Luka Bonačić (appointed 9 Jun 2006); Jorvan Vieira (appointed 5 Feb 2008)
- Stadium: Naghsh-e Jahan Stadium
- 7th Pro League: 2nd
- 21st Hazfi Cup: Quarter-final
- 26th AFC Champions: Runners-up
- 4th FIFA Club World: Quarter-final
- Top goalscorer: League: Mahmoud Karimi (9); All: Emad Ridha (15)
- Lowest home attendance: 1,000; Aboomoslem(24 Aug 2007); Paykan(29 Aug 2007)
Home colours	Away colours	Third colours

This is a list of Sepahan F.C.'s results at the IPL 2007/08, the 2007 ACL, the 2007 Club World Cup, and the 2008 ACL. The club is competing in the Iran Pro League, Hazfi Cup, as well as the Asian Champions League, and FIFA Club World Cup.

== Players ==
Updated 20 December 2017.

=== First-team squad ===
Note: Flags indicate national team as defined under FIFA eligibility rules; some limited exceptions apply. Players may hold more than one non-FIFA nationality.

No.	Pos.	Nation	Player
1	GK	IRN	Abbas Mohammadi
2	DF	IRN	Hamid Azizzadeh
3	DF	IRN	Reza Talabeh
4	MF	IRN	Moharram Navidkia
5	DF	IRN	Hadi Aghily
6	DF	IRN	Jalal Akbari
7	MF	IRN	Farshad Bahadorani
8	DF	IRN	Mohsen Bengar
9	FW	GEO	Jaba Mujiri
10	FW	IRQ	Emad Mohammed
11	MF	IRN	Hossein Kazemi
12	MF	IRQ	Abdul-Wahab Abu Al-Hail
13	FW	IRN	Mahmoud Karimi
14	FW	NGA	Kabir Bello
15	GK	IRN	Amirhossein Sadeghzadeh

No.	Pos.	Nation	Player
17	MF	IRN	Hadi Jafari
18	FW	IRN	Mohsen Hamidi
19	DF	IRN	Amir Radi
20	MF	IRN	Hojat Zadmahmoud
21	DF	IRN	Saeid Bayat
22	GK	IRN	Mohammad Savari
23	FW	IRN	Seyed Mehdi Seyed Salehi
24	GK	IRN	Masoud Homami
25	MF	IRN	Ebrahim Lovinian
26	MF	IRN	Jalaladin Ali Mohammadi
27	MF	IRN	Abolhassan Jafari
28	MF	IRN	Ehsan Hajsafi
29	MF	IRN	Behzad Soltani
30	MF	IRN	Hossein Papi
35	MF	IRQ	Haitham Kadhim

- [U21 = Under 21 year player | U23 = Under 23 year player| U25 = Under 25 year player]

For recent transfers, see List of Iranian football transfers summer 2018.

Last updated: 26 August 2018.

== Matches ==
=== Pro league ===
==== League table ====
Pos	Team	Pld	W	D	L	GF	GA	GD	Pts	Qualification or relegation
1	Persepolis (C)	34	18	11	5	55	34	+21	59 (Note: Persepolis was deducted 6 points in issued by FIFA.)	Qualification for the 2009 AFC Champions League
2	Sepahan	34	17	10	7	53	38	+15	58 (Note: Sepahan was deducted 3 points in issued by Iranian Football Federation.)	Qualification for the 2009 AFC Champions League
3	Saba	34	13	13	8	41	37	+4	52	Qualification for the 2009 AFC Champions League
4	Aboumoslem	34	14	8	12	37	37	0	50	
5	Pas Hamedan	34	11	16	7	36	28	+8	49	

Updated to match(es) played on 01 SEP 2018. Source: IPL Stats, Soccerway
Rules for classification: 1) Points; 2) Goal difference; 3) Goals scored.
(C) Champions

==== Results summary ====
Overall								Home						Away					
Pld	W	D	L	GF	GA	GD	Pts	W	D	L	GF	GA	GD	W	D	L	GF	GA	GD
34	17	10	7	53	38	+15	61	9	7	1	28	16	+12	8	3	6	25	22	+3

Last updated: 25 August 2018.

==== Results by round ====
Round	1	2	3	4	5	6	7	8	9	10	11	12	13	14	15	16	17	18	19	20	21	22	23	24	25	26	27	28	29	30	31	32	33	34
Ground	A	H	A	H	A	H	A	H	H	H	H	A	A	A	A	A	H	H	A	H	A	H	A	H	A	H	A	H	A	H	A	H	H	A
Result	W	W	W	D	W	W	L	W	W	W	D	W	D	L	D	L	W	W	L	D	W	D	L	D	W	W	W	D	W	L	D	D	W	L

Source: flashscores.co.uk
A = Away; H = Home; W = Win; D = Draw; L = Loss

==== Matches ====
Win Draw Loss Postponed

Date Round	Home	Score	Away	Location

8/16/2007 1	Pegah	0–2	Sepahan	Rasht
		Report	Zadmahmoud 68'; Mahmoud 73'; Kazemi (yellow card); Bengar (yellow card); Mohammadi (yellow card); Hajsafi (yellow card); Players: Mohammadi, Aghily, Hajsafi, Bengar, Bayat, Abu Al-Hail, Lovinian, Kazemi, Mohammadi, Mahmoud, Akbari (Azizzadeh 46), Emad Redha (Zadmahmoud 60)	Stadium: Azodi; Attendance: 15,000

8/24/2007 2	Sepahan	2–1	Aboumoslem	Esfahan
	Moharram 42'; Mahmoud 66'; Bayat (yellow card); Aghily (yellow card); Players: Mohammadi, Aghily, Hajsafi, Bengar, Abu Al-Hail, Bayat, Mahmoud, Moharram, Emad Redha (Bahadorani 69), Akbari (Azizzadeh 62), Kazemi (Papi 60)		Nasehi 88'; Razzaghi (yellow card); Khani (yellow card); Daneshdoost (yellow card)	Stadium: Foolad Shahr; Attendance: 1,000; Referee: Alireza Faghani

8/29/2007 3	Paykan	1–2	Sepahan	Tahran
	Memar , 11' (o.g.); Rezapour 90+2'; Aziz-Mohammadi (yellow card)	Report	Mahmoud 43'; Players: Mohammadi, Aghily, Bayat, Bengar, Akbari, Moharram, Abu Al-Hail, Mahmoud, Hajsafi (Lovinian 76), Kazemi(Bahadorani 71), Emad Redha(Azizzadeh 46)	Stadium: Qods; Attendance: 1,000; Referee: Shahin Haj Babaei

9/6/2007 4	Sepahan	2–2	Rah Ahan	Esfahan
	Mahmoud 17' 23'; Bengar (yellow card); Mohammadi (yellow card); Players: Mohammadi, Aghily, Bengar, Akbari, Bahadorani, Moharram, Abu Al-Hail, Mahmoud, Lovinian (Azizzadeh 59), Emad Redha ( Papi61), Bayat ( Kazemi 75)	Report	Mohammad 38'; Mkhitaryan 51'; Nourmohamadi (yellow card); Mkhitaryan (yellow card); Sabeti (yellow card) (yellow-red card); Mohammad (yellow card)	Stadium: Foolad Shahr; Attendance: 2,000; Referee: Hedayat Mombini

9/11/2007 5	Fajr	0–2	Sepahan	Shiraz
	Amiri , 29' (o.g.); Abbasi (yellow card); Zare (yellow card)	Report	Abu Al-Hail 61'; Moharram (yellow card)	Stadium: Hafezieh; Attendance: 5,000; Referee: Mahmoud Rafiei

10/7/2007 6	Sepahan	2–1	Esteghlal	Esfahan
	Abu Al-Hail 7' 90+4'; Bengar (yellow card)	Report	Ghorbani 75'; Ghorbani (yellow card); Pooladi (yellow card); Amirabadi (yellow card); Majidi (yellow card)	Stadium: Foolad Shahr; Attendance: 15,000; Referee: Saeid Mozaffarizadeh

10/13/2007 7	Esteghlal AHV	3–2	Sepahan	Ahvaz
	Maydavoodi 7'; Haghi 47'; Ramezani 73'; Salari (yellow card)	Report	Mahmoud 37'; Bello 65'; Mohammadi (yellow card); Bayat (yellow card)	Stadium: Takhti; Attendance: 12,000; Referee: Ghasem Vahedi

10/18/2007 8	Sepahan	3–2	Malavan	Esfahan
	Mahmoud 4'; Zadmahmoud 10'; Savari (yellow card); Abu Al-Hail (yellow card)	Report	Niknazar (penalty missed); Rafkhaei 6'; Zare (pen.), 16'; Pourgholami , 90+5' (o.g.); Sadeghi (yellow card)	Stadium: Foolad Shahr; Attendance: 3,000; Referee: Khodadad Afsharian

11/1/2007 9	Sepahan	1–0	Shirin Faraz	Esfahan
	Aghily (pen.), 12'; Bayat (yellow card)		Siah (yellow card); Panahi (yellow card); Ataei (yellow card) (yellow-red card)	Stadium: Foolad Shahr; Attendance: 1,000; Referee: Saeid Mozaffarizadeh

11/19/2007 10	Sepahan	4–0	Bargh	Esfahan
	Seyed Mehdi Seyed Salehi 38' 41'; Abu Al-Hail 90'; Bahadorani (yellow card); Bengar (yellow card) Hajsafi (yellow card)		Hashemi , 18' (o.g.)	Stadium: Foolad Shahr; Attendance: 7,000; Referee: Mohammad Hossein Asadi

11/23/2007 11	Sepahan	0–0	PAS	Esfahan
	Lovinian (yellow card); Mujiri (yellow card) Aghily (yellow card)		Tomich (yellow card); Daghighi (yellow card)	Stadium: Foolad Shahr; Attendance: 5,000; Referee: Saeid Mozaffarizadeh

11/27/2007 12	Saba	0–1	Sepahan	Tehran
	Golmohamadi (yellow card); Kashi (yellow card)	Report	Hamidi 52'; Bengar (yellow card); Mohammadi (yellow card); Kazemi (yellow card)	Stadium: Derakhshan; Attendance: 2,000; Referee: Mohsen Torki

12/1/2007 13	Sanat Naft	2–2	Sepahan	Abadan
	Pimenta 45+1' 90' (pen.); Mirghorbani (yellow card)	Report	Hamidi 34'; Aghily 60'; Seyed Salehi (yellow card); Abu Al-Hail (yellow card); Bayat (yellow card); Mohammadi (red card)	Stadium: Takhti; Attendance: 6,000; Referee: Masoud Moradi

12/16/2007 14	Zob Ahan	1–0	Sepahan	Esfahan
	da Silva (yellow card); Mansouri (yellow card); Salehinejad (yellow card) (yellow-red card)	Report	Bengar 16' (o.g.)	Stadium: Foolad Shahr; Attendance: 3,000; Referee: Masoud Moradi

12/21/2007 15	Mes	1–1	Sepahan	Kerman
	Khodabandelou 75'; Rajabi (yellow card); Khalili (yellow card); Mirtoroghi (yellow card)	Report	Abu Al-Hail 65'; Bengar (yellow card); Hajsafi (yellow card)	Stadium: Bahonar; Attendance: 10,000; Referee: Ghasem Vahedi

12/26/2007 16	Saipa	1–0	Sepahan	Kerman
	Ansarifard 53'; Ayoubi (yellow card)	Report	Abu Al-Hail (yellow card); Lovinian (yellow card)	Stadium: Bahonar; Attendance: 5,000; Referee: Yadollah Jahanbazi

12/31/2007 17	Sepahan	2–1	Persepolis	Esfahan
	Emad Redha 41'; Bayat (yellow card)	Report	Nosrati 35' (o.g.); Aghaei 80'; Badamaki (yellow card)	Stadium: Foolad Shahr; Attendance: 25,000; Referee: Khodadad Afsharian

1/22/2008 18	Sepahan	3–1	Pegah	Esfahan
	Zadmahmoud 35' 40'; Emad Redha 64'; Bengar (yellow card); Abu Al-Hail (yellow card); Ali Mohammadi (yellow card)	Report	Maleki 22'; Nuori (yellow card)	Stadium: Foolad Shahr; Referee: Hossein Nouri

1/27/2008 19	Aboumoslem	2–1	Sepahan	Mashhad
	Hosseini 15'; Mansouri 86'; Petrovich (yellow card); Haghdoost (yellow card) (yellow-red card)	Report	Papi 78'	Stadium: Takhti; Attendance: 3,000; Referee: Saadat Baghban

2/10/2008 20	Sepahan	1–1	Paykan	Esfahan
	Bengar 82'; Hajsafi (yellow card); Kazemi (yellow card); Bengar (yellow card)	Report	Aziz-Mohammadi 39'; Kendo (yellow card); Ronny (yellow card); Khosravi (yellow card); Ghorbani (red card)	Stadium: Foolad Shahr; Referee: Ghasem Vahedi

2/15/2008 21	Rah Ahan	0–1	Sepahan	Tehran
	Baou (yellow card); Rahimi (yellow card)	Report	Hajsafi 36'; Jafari (yellow card); Abu Al-Hail (yellow card)	Stadium: Ekbatan; Attendance: 1,000; Referee: Mohammad Hossein Asadi

2/22/2008 22	Sepahan	0–0	Fajr	Esfahan
	Kazemi (yellow card); Aghily (yellow card)	Report	Sabri (yellow card); Karami (yellow card); Mousavi (yellow card)	Stadium: Foolad Shahr; Referee: Jamshid Daneshmehr

3/2/2008 23	PAS	3–1	Sepahan	Hamedan
	Alavi 4'; Obuća 12' 19'; Omranzadeh (yellow card); Chatrabgoon (yellow card)	Report	Bengar 41'; Lovinian (yellow card)	Stadium: Qods; Attendance: 7,000; Referee: Saadat Baghban

3/5/2008 24	Sepahan	2–2	Zob Ahan	Esfahan
	Emad Redha 77'; Hajsafi 86'; Bengar (yellow card)	Report	Khalatbari 32'; Mosalman 61'; Ahmadi (yellow card); Khalatbari (yellow card)	Stadium: Foolad Shahr; Referee: Navid Mozafari

3/29/2008 25	Esteghlal	0–1	Sepahan	Tehran
		Report	Hajsafi 66'; Bayat (yellow card); Mohammadi (yellow card); Azizzadeh (yellow card)	Stadium: Azadi; Attendance: 55,000; Referee: Saadat Baghban

4/3/2008 26	Sepahan	2–1	Esteghlal AHV	Esfahan
	Mahmoud 16'; Seyed Mehdi Seyed Salehi 27'; Mohammadi (yellow card); Bahadorani (yellow card); Akbari (yellow card); Seyed Mehdi Seyed Salehi (yellow card)	Report	Haghi 70'; Haghi (yellow card); Torshizi (yellow card)	Stadium: Foolad Shahr; Referee: Yadollah Jahanbazi

4/13/2008 27	Malavan	1–2	Sepahan	Bandar-e Anzali
	Rafkhaei 12'; Niknazar 59' (o.g.); Ta'mini (yellow card); Rafkhaei (yellow card); Zare (red card)	Report	Mahmoud 27'; Bahadorani (yellow card); Hajsafi (yellow card); Kazemi (red card)	Stadium: Takhti; Attendance: 12,000; Referee: Masoud Moradi

4/18/2008 28	Sepahan	1–1	Mes	Esfahan
	Seyed Mehdi Seyed Salehi 75'; Bayat (yellow card); Seyed Mehdi Seyed Salehi (yellow card); Lovinian (yellow card)	Report	Khodabandelou 78'; Khodabandelou (yellow card)	Stadium: Foolad Shahr; Referee: Tooraj Haghverdi

4/27/2008 29	Shirin Faraz	2–3	Sepahan	Kermanshah
	Mohamadian 52'; Zaferani 85' (pen.); Badra (yellow card); Zaferani (yellow card)	Report	Zadmahmoud 7'Emad Redha 67' 68'; Aghily (yellow card); Homami (yellow card)	Stadium: Azadi; Attendance: 5,000; Referee: Alireza Faghani

4/30/2008 30	Sepahan	0–1	Saipa	Esfahan
		Report	Traoré 20'; Memarzadeh (yellow card); Rahmati (yellow card)	Stadium: Foolad Shahr; Attendance: 4,000; Referee: Mohsen Ghahremani

5/3/2008 31	Bargh	3–3	Sepahan	Shiraz
	Abedi 22'; Zare 51' 72'; Shiri (yellow card); Gholamzadeh (yellow card); Imani (yellow card); Abedinejad (yellow card)	Report	Hajsafi 20'; Emad Redha 23' 38'; Bayat (yellow card); Akbari (yellow card); Emad Redha (yellow card)	Stadium: Hafezieh; Attendance: 5,000; Referee: Saeid Mozaffarizadeh

5/11/2008 32	Sepahan	2–2	Saba	Esfahan
	Emad Redha 58'; Kazemi 73'; Bengar (yellow card)	Report	Avdić 40'; Fazli 78'; Abbasfard (yellow card); Nouri (yellow card)	Stadium: Foolad Shahr; Attendance: 6,000; Referee: Yadollah Jahanbazi

5/14/2008 33	Sepahan	1–0	Sanat Naft	Esfahan
	Hajsafi 45+1'; Bengar (yellow card)	Report	Samieinia (yellow card); Shirmardi (yellow card); Mirghorbani (yellow card)	Stadium: Foolad Shahr; Attendance: 1,000; Referee: Rahim Rahimi Moghadam

5/17/2008 34	Persepolis	2–1	Sepahan	Tehran
	Khalili 17'; Heidari 90+6'; Kaebi (yellow card); Nikbakht (yellow card); Zarei (red card)	Report	Hajsafi 30'; Homami (yellow card); Hajsafi (yellow card); Lovinian (yellow card); Jafari (yellow card); Emad Redha (yellow card); Hamidi (yellow card); Kazemi (yellow card); Abu Al-Hail (yellow card); Papi (yellow card)	Stadium: Azadi; Attendance: 100,000; Referee: Saeid Mozaffarizadeh

=== 2007 AFC Champions League ===
==== Group stage ====
Team	Pld	W	D	L	GF	GA	GD	Pts
(Iran) Sepahan	6	4	1	1	12	5	+7	13
(Saudi Arabia) Al-Shabab	6	3	1	2	9	3	+6	10
(United Arab Emirates) Al Ain	6	1	3	2	5	8	−3	6
(Syria) Al-Ittihad	6	0	3	3	3	13	−10	3

Win Draw Loss Postponed

Date Round	Home	Score	Away	Location

7 March 2007 1	Sepahan (Iran)	2–1	(Syria) Al-Ittihad	Foolad Shahr Stadium, Isfahan, Iran
	Mehdi Seyed Salehi 19', 29'	(Report)	Anas Sari 12'	Attendance: 25,000; Referee: Saad Kameel Al Fadhli (Kuwait)

21 March 2007 2	Al-Shabab (Saudi Arabia)	0–1	(Iran) Sepahan	King Fahd II Stadium, Riyadh, Saudi Arabia
		(Report)	Mehdi Seyed Salehi 83'	Attendance: 8,000; Referee: Ravshan Irmatov (Uzbekistan)

11 April 2007 3	Al Ain (United Arab Emirates)	3–2	(Iran) Sepahan	Sheikh Khalifa International Stadium, Al Ain, UAE
	Ali Al-Wehaibi 6'; Msalam Faiez 44'; Frank Ongfiang 84'	(Report)	Mehdi Seyed Salehi 8'; Emad Mohammed 65'	Attendance: 7,000; Referee: Chaiwat Kunsuta (Thailand)

25 April 2007 4	Sepahan (Iran)	1–1	(United Arab Emirates) Al Ain	Foolad Shahr Stadium, Isfahan, Iran
	Hossein Papi 49'	(Report)	Hawar Mulla Mohammed 86'	Attendance: 25,000; Referee: Mark Shield (Australia)

9 May 2007 5	Al-Ittihad (Syria)	0–5	(Iran) Sepahan	Al-Hamadaniah Stadium, Aleppo, Syria
		(Report)	Abdul-Wahab Abu Al-Hail 10'; Mohammad Nori 40', 55'; Emad Mohammed 70', 90'	Attendance: 2,000; Referee: Lee Gi-Young (South Korea)

23 May 2007 6	Sepahan (Iran)	1–0	(Saudi Arabia) Al-Shabab	Foolad Shahr Stadium, Isfahan, Iran
	Mehdi Seyed Salehi 33'	(Report)		Attendance: 30,000; Referee: Yuichi Nishimura (Japan)

==== Knock-out stage ====
===== Bracket =====
Quarter finals
(Iran) Sepahan (p)	0	0	0 (5)
(Japan) Kawasaki Frontale	0	0	0 (4)
(United Arab Emirates) Al-Wahda (a)	0	1	1
(Saudi Arabia) Al-Hilal	0	1	1
(South Korea) Seognam Ilhwa Chunma	2	2	4
(Syria) Al-Karamah	1	0	1
(Japan) Urawa Red Diamonds	2	2	4
(South Korea) Jeonbuk Hyundai Motors (2006 Champion)	1	0	1

Semi-finals
(Iran) Sepahan	3	0	3
(United Arab Emirates) Al-Wahda	1	0	1
(South Korea) Seongnam Ilhwa Chunma	2	2	4 (3)
(Japan) Urawa Red Diamonds (p)	2	2	4 (5)

Final
(Iran) Sepahan	1	0	1
(Japan) Urawa Red Diamonds	1	2	3

Win Draw Loss Postponed

Date Round	Home	Score	Away	Location

19 September 2007 Quarter-finals; First leg	Sepahan (Iran)	0–0	(Japan) Kawasaki Frontale	Foolad Shahr Stadium, Isfahan, Iran
		Report		Attendance: 25,000; Referee: Jasim Karim (Bahrain)

26 September 2007 Quarter-finals; Second leg	Kawasaki Frontale (Japan)	0–0 (4–5 p)	(Iran) Sepahan	Todoroki Athletics Stadium, Kawasaki, Japan
		Report		Attendance: 13,507; Referee: Saad Kameel Al Fadhli (Kuwait)
	Penalties
	Juninho (penalty scored); Kazuki Ganaha (penalty scored); Masahiro Ohashi (penalty scored); Hiroyuki Taniguchi (penalty missed); Shuhei Terada (penalty scored)		(penalty scored) Hadi Aghili; (penalty scored) Moharram Navidkia; (penalty scored) Abdul-Wahab Abu Al-Hail; (penalty scored) Farshad Bahadorani; (penalty scored) Jalal Akbari

- Sepahan progress 5–4 on penalties after 0–0 aggregate score

3 October 2007 Semi-finals; First leg	Sepahan (Iran)	3–1	(United Arab Emirates) Al-Wahda	Foolad Shahr Stadium, Isfahan, Iran
	Mahmoud Karimi 11', 58'; Moharram Navidkia 85' (pen.)	Report	Mohamed Al Shehhi 48'	Referee: Abdul Bashir (Singapore)

24 October 2007 Semi-finals; Second leg	Al-Wahda (United Arab Emirates)	0–0	(Iran) Sepahan	Al-Nahyan Stadium, Abu Dhabi, UAE
		Report		Attendance: 13,000; Referee: Ben Williams (Australia)

- Sepahan progress 3–1 on aggregate

7 November 2007 Final; First leg	Sepahan (Iran)	1–1	(Japan) Urawa Red Diamonds	Foolad Shahr Stadium, Isfahan, Iran
	Mahmoud Karimi 47'	Report	Robson Ponte 45'	Attendance: 30,000; Referee: Subkhiddin Mohd Salleh (Malaysia)

14 November 2007 Final; Second leg	Urawa Red Diamonds (Japan)	2–0	(Iran) Sepahan	Saitama Stadium, Saitama, Japan
	Yuichiro Nagai 22'; Yuki Abe 71'	Report		Attendance: 59,034; Referee: Ravshan Irmatov (Uzbekistan)

- Urawa Red Diamonds win 3–1 on aggregate

=== FIFA Club World Cup ===
==== Bracket ====
Wild card
7 December – Tokyo
(Iran) Sepahan	3
(New Zealand) Waitakere United	1

Quarterfinals
10 December – Toyota City
(Iran) Sepahan	1
(Japan) Urawa Red Diamonds	3
9 December – Tokyo
(Tunisia) Étoile du Sahel	1
(Mexico) Pachuca	0

Semifinals
13 December – Yokohama
(Japan) Urawa Red Diamonds	0
(Italy) Milan	1
12 December – Tokyo
(Tunisia) Étoile du Sahel	0
(Argentina) Boca Juniors	1

Final
16 December – Yokohama
(Italy) Milan	4
(Argentina) Boca Juniors	2
Third place
16 December – Yokohama
(Japan) Urawa Red Diamonds	2 (4)
(Tunisia) Étoile du Sahel	2 (2)

Win Draw Loss Postponed

Date Round	Home	Score	Away	Location

7 December 2007 Play-off	Sepahan (Iran)	3–1	(New Zealand) Waitakere United	National Stadium, Tokyo
19:45	Emad Mohammed 3', 4'; Abdul-Wahab 47'	Report	Aghili 74' (o.g.)	Attendance: 24,788; Referee: Marco Rodríguez (Mexico)

10 December 2007 Quarter-finals	Sepahan (Iran)	1–3	(Japan) Urawa Red Diamonds	Toyota Stadium, Toyota City
19:30	Karimi 80'	Report	Nagai 32'; Washington 54'; Aghili 70' (o.g.)	Attendance: 33,263; Referee: Coffi Codjia (Benin)

=== Hazfi Cup ===
Win Draw Loss Postponed

Date Round	Home	Score	Away	Location

February 18, 2008 1/16 Final	Sepahan	1–0	Mehrkam Pars Tehran

February 26, 2008 1/8 Final	Fajr Sepasi Shiraz F.C.	1–2	Sepahan

May 2008 1/8 Final	Pegah	4–2	Sepahan

=== 2008 AFC Champions League ===
==== Group stage ====
Team	Pld	W	D	L	GF	GA	GD	Pts
(Uzbekistan) PFC Kuruvchi	6	4	1	1	8	2	6	13
(Saudi Arabia) Al-Ittihad Jeddah	6	3	0	3	6	5	1	9
(Iran) Sepahan F.C.	6	2	1	3	5	8	−3	7
(Syria) Al-Ittihad Aleppo	6	2	0	4	4	8	−4	6

Win Draw Loss Postponed

Date Round	Home	Score	Away	Location

March 12, 2008 1	Sepahan F.C. (Iran)	0–2	(Syria) Al-Ittihad Aleppo	Foolad Shahr, Isfahan, Iran
		Report	Jésus Gomez 21'; Abdul Fattah Alaga 87'	Attendance: 15,000; Referee: Ben Williams (Australia))

March 19, 2008 2	PFC Kuruvchi (Uzbekistan)	2–0	(Iran) Sepahan F.C.	MHSK, Tashkent, Uzbekistan
	Ulugbek Bakayev 61'; Timur Kapadze 80'	Report		Attendance: 13,000; Referee: Fareed Al Marzouqi (United Arab Emirates)

April 9, 2008 3	Sepahan F.C. (Iran)	2–1	(Saudi Arabia) Al-Ittihad Jeddah	Azadi, Tehran, Iran
	Seyed Mohammad Salehi 59'; Hadi Aghily 71'	Report	Talal Al-Meshal 89'	Attendance: 6,000; Referee: Sun Baojie (China)

April 23, 2008 4	Al-Ittihad Jeddah (Saudi Arabia)	0–1	(Iran) Sepahan F.C.	Prince Abdullah, Jeddah, Saudi Arabia
		Report	Emad Mohammed 70'	Attendance: 4,000; Referee: Saad Kameel Al Fadhli (Kuwait)

May 7, 2008 5	Al-Ittihad Aleppo (Syria)	2–1	(Iran) Sepahan F.C.	Aleppo International, Aleppo, Syria
	Jonathan Laurens 61'; Jésus Gomez 64'		Hadi Aghily 48'4,000	Attendance: 4,000; Referee: Naser Al Ghafary (Jordan)

May 21, 2008 6	Sepahan F.C. (Iran)	1–1	(Uzbekistan) PFC Kuruvchi	Azadi, Tehran, Iran
	Jalaladin Ali Mohammadi 2'	Report	Gochguli Gochguliev 72'	Attendance: 150; Referee: Abdullah Mohamed Al Hilali (Oman)

== Goals ==
As of 2 Sep 2018

Rank	Player	Position	Pro League	Hazfi Cup	AFC 2007	AFC 2008	FIFA Club World	Total
1	(Iraq) Emad Reza	FW	8	1	3	1	2	15
2	(Iran) Mahmoud Karimi	FW	9	-	3	-	1	13
3	(Iran) Seyed Mehdi Seyed Salehi	FW	4	1	5	1	-	11
4	(Iran) Abdul-Wahab Abu Al-Hail	MF	5	-	1	-	1	7
5	(Iran) Ehsan Hajsafi	MF	6	-	-	-	-	6
6	(Iran) Hojat Zadmahmoud	MF	5	-	-	-	-	5
7	(Iran) Hadi Aghily	DF	2	1	-	2	-	5
8	(Iran) Hossein Papi	MF	2	-	1	-	-	3
9	(Iran) Mohsen Hamidi	FW	2	-	-	-	-	2
10	(Iran) Mohsen Bengar	DF	2	-	-	-	-	2
11	(Iran) Moharram Navidkia	MF	1	-	1	-	-	2
12	(Iran) Mohammad Nouri	MF	-	-	2	-	-	2
13	(Nigeria) Kabir Bello	FW	1	-	-	-	-	1
14	(Iran) Ebrahim Loveinian	MF	-	1	-	-	-	1
14	(Iran) Hossein Kazemi	MF	1	-	-	-	-	1
15	(Iran) Jalaleddin Alimohammadi	MF	-	-	-	1	-	1
Own goals			5	-	-	-	-	5
Total			53	5	16	5	4	83

=== Sepahan squad IPL statistics ===
No.	Position	Player	Apps	Apps Start	Goals	Assists	YCs	RCs
1	GK	(Iran) Abbas Mohammadi	18	18	−16	2	6	1
2	DF	(Iran) Hamid Azizzadeh	19	13	-	-	1	–
3	DF	(Iran) Reza Talabeh	7	3	-	-	-	–
4	MF	(Iran) Moharram Navidkia	8	8	1	2	1	–
5	DF	(Iran) Hadi Aghily	26	26	2	1	4	–
6	DF	(Iran) Jalal Akbari	25	21	-	1	2	–
7	MF	(Iran) Farshad Bahadorani	21	10	-	2	3	–
8	DF	(Iran) Mohsen Bengar	28	28	2	1	10	-
9	DF	(Georgia (country)) Jaba Mujiri	13	11	-	-	1	–
10	FW	(Iraq) Emad Mohammed	25	22	8	1	1	-
11	MF	(Iran) Hossein Kazemi	28	23	1	4	5	1
12	MF	(Iraq) Abdul-Wahab Abu Al-Hail	30	30	5	2	6	-
13	FW	(Iran) Mahmoud Karimi	19	17	9	2	-	-
14	FW	(Nigeria) Kabir Bello	5	-	1	1	-	–
15	GK	(Iran) Amirhossein Sadeghzadeh	-	-	-	-	-	–
17	MF	(Iran) Hadi Jafari	20	17	0	2	2	-
18	FW	(Iran) Mohsen Hamidi	14	4	2	-	1	-
19	DF	(Iran) Amir Radi	1	-	-	-	-	-
20	MF	(Iran) Hojat Zadmahmoud	19	11	5	-	1	–
21	DF	(Iran) Saeid Bayat	22	19	-	2	8	–
22	GK	(Iran) Mohammad Savari	6	6	−6	-	1	–
23	FW	(Iran) Seyed Mehdi Seyed Salehi	19	15	4	-	-	–
24	GK	(Iran) Masoud Homami	10	9	−14	-	2	-
25	MF	(Iran) Ebrahim Lovinian	19	14	-	1	5	-
26	MF	(Iran) Jalaladin Ali Mohammadi	5	1	-	-	1	-
27	MF	(Iran) Abolhassan Jafari	2	1	-	-	-	-
28	MF	(Iran) Ehsan Hajsafi	31	28	5	5	6	-
29	MF	(Iran) Behzad Soltani	-	-	-	-	-	-
30	MF	(Iran) Hossein Papi	18	9	1	2	1	-
35	MF	(Iraq) Haitham Kadhim	3	3	-	-	-	–
