= 2008–09 Sepahan F.C. season =

Sepahan
2008–09 season
- Chairman: Mohammad Reza Saket
- Manager: Farhad Kazemi (From week 20); Hossein Charkhabi (from week 14 to week 19); Engin Firat (first 13 weeks)
- Iran Pro League: 4th
- AFC Champions League: First Round
- Hazfi Cup: 1/8 Final
- Top goalscorer: League: Emad Ridha (14); All: Emad Ridha (16)

This is a list of Sepahan F.C.'s results at the Persian Gulf Cup 2008-09, Hazfi Cup 2008-09 and 2009 ACL. The club is competing in the Iran Pro League, Hazfi Cup and Asian Champions League.

== Persian Gulf Cup ==
=== Statistics ===
Last updated sep 14 2008

No.	Position	Player	Apps	Apps Start	Goals	Assists	YCs	RCs
1	GK	(Iran) Abbas Mohammadi	2	2				
2	DF	(Iran) Amir Saadati			-			–
3	DF	(Iran) Hamid Azizzadeh	1	0	-	-		–
4	MF	(Iran) Moharram Navidkia (c)						–
5	DF	(Iran) Hadi Aghily	4	4				–
6	DF	(Iran) Jalal Akbari	4	4	-		1	–
7	MF	(Iraq) Emad Mohammed	4	4	2		2	–
8	DF	(Iran) Mohsen Bengar	4	3			1	
9	MF	(Iran) Mehdi Jafarpour	3	2	1			–
10	MF	(Iran) Farshad Bahadorani	2	1				1
11	FW	(Iran) Hadi Asghari	1	0			-	–
12	MF	(Iraq) Abdul-Wahab Abu Al-Hail	4	3			1	-
13	FW	(Iran) Mahmoud Karimi					-	-
14	DF	(Iran) Hamed Kiani			-			–
15	MF	(Iran) Hossein Papi	4	0				-
16	FW	(Iran) Bahman Tahmasebi	2	0	-			–
17	MF	(Iran) Hadi Jafari						-
18	DF	(Iran) Mehdi Karimian	1	0	-			–
20	FW	(Iran) Ahmad Jamshidian	4	3	-	2		–
21	DF	(Mozambique) Armando Sá	4	4	-		1	–
22	GK	(Iran) Rahman Ahmadi				-		–
23	DF	(Iran) Reza Talabeh			-	-	-	–
24	DF	(Iran) Mohammad Reza Zare	2	0	-			–
25	MF	(Iran) Ebrahim Lovinian			-			-
26	MF	(Iran) Jalaladin Ali Mohammadi			-	-		-
27	MF	(Iran) Abolhassan Jafari			-	-	-	-
28	MF	(Iran) Ehsan Hajsafi	4	2			3	-
29	MF	(Iran) Behzad Soltani	-	-	-	-	-	-
TBA	MF	(Iran) Ali Molaei			-			–
32	FW	(Iran) Miad Abazari			-			–
33	MF	(Iran) Rasoul Khatibi			-			–
40	MF	(Cameroon) Jacques Elong Elong			-			–

=== Matches ===
Last updated Apr 26 2009

#	Date	Home	Score	Away	Goal	Yellow card	Red card	Fans	Ref	Rank
1	2008-Aug-5	PAS	0–0	Sepahan	–	Ehsan Hajsafi	Farshad Bahadorani	4000	Mohsen Ghahremani	11
2	2008-Nov-3	Sepahan	3–2	Payam	Emad Mohamad Redha (12), Hadi Asghari (30), Bahman Tahmasebi (82)	Ahmad Jamshidian	–	6000	Alborz Hajipour	5
3	2008-Aug-17	Esteghlal	1–1	Sepahan	Mehdi Jafarpour (24)	Mohsen Bengar, Ehsan Hajsafi, Emad Mohamad Redha	–	30000	Mohsen Torky	5
4	2008-Aug-24	Sepahan	2–0	Saba QOM	Emad Mohamad Redha (44) (60)	Jalal Akbari, Emad Mohamad Redha, Armando Miguel Sá	–	4000	Yadolah Jahanbazi	6
5	2008-Oct-18	Saipa	1–1	Sepahan	Hadi Asghari (40)	–	–	1000	Mohsen Ghahremani	7
6	2008-Sep-12	Sepahan	0–0	Malavan	–	Abdolvahab Aoleihl, Ehsan Hajsafi	–	4000	Mahmoud Rafei	8
7	2008-Sep-18	Zob Ahan	2–1	Sepahan	Ehsan Hajsafi (33)	Mohsen Bengar, Farshad Bahadorani, Armando Miguel Sá, Ahmad Jamshidian	–	12000	Hedayat Mombeini	12
8	2008-Sep-25	Sepahan	2–0	Foolad	Ehsan Hajsafi (9), Hadi Asghari (51)	Abdolvahab Abolhail	–	5000	Mohsen Torky	8
9	2008-Oct-2	Rah Ahan	0–1	Sepahan	Hadi Asghari (20)	Ahmad Jamshidian, Mehdi Jafarpour, Armando Miguel Sá	–	1000	Hossein Asadi	6
10	2008-Oct-7	Bargh	1–1	Sepahan	Ehsan Hajsafi (23)	Rahman Ahmadi, Abdolvahab Abolhail, Farshad Bahadorani, Bahman Tahmasebi, Hamid Aziz Zade	–	15000	Saeed Mozafari Zadeh	4
11	2008-Oct-22	Sepahan	2–4	Paykan	Ahmad Jamshidian (22) (70)	Rahman Ahmadi	Farshad Bahadorani	2000	Khodadad Afsharian	10
12	2008-Oct-26	Persepolis	3–2	Sepahan	Emad Ridha (28) (34)	Hadi Aghili, Mehdi Jafarpour	Hadi Aghili	60000	Mohsen Torky	10
13	2008-Sep-31	Sepahan	1–0	Mes	Emad Mohamad Redha (65)	–	–	2000	Saeed Bakhshizadeh	8
14	2008-Nov-7	Sepahan	1–1	Damash	Emad Mohamad Redha (85)pen	–	–	7000	Ghasem Vahedi	7
15	2008-Nov-21	Esteghlal Ahvaz	1–3	Sepahan	Ali Ansarian (11) o.g, Emad Mohamad Redha (24), Ehsan Hajsafi (90+4)	Armando Miguel Sá, Jalal Akbari, Ahmad Jamshidian	–	3000	Alireza Faghani	4
16	2008-Nov-29	Sepahan	2–1	Aboomoslem	Ahmad Jamshdian (37), Emad Mohamad Redha (67)	Jalal Akbari, Ahmad Jamshidian	–	5000	Toraj Haghverdi	4
17	2008-Dec-4	Moghavemat	1–0	Sepahan	–	Amir Hoshang Saadati	–	3000	Yadolah Jahanbazi	6
18	2008-Dec-8	Sepahan	2–2	PAS	Bahman Tahmasebi(27), Hamed Kiani (90+3)	Armando Miguel Sá, Mohsen Bengar	Mohsen Bengar	5000	Hedayat Mombini	6
19	2008-Dec-12	Sepahan	2–2	Payam	Emad Mohamad Redha (78) (80)	Mehdi Karimian, Abdolvahab Abolhail	–	2000	Rahim Mehrpishe	6
20	2008-Dec-30	Sepahan	2–1	Esteghlal	Moharram Navidkia(10), Ali Alizade (25) o.g.	Armando Miguel Sá, Mehdi Jafarpour, Emad Mohamad Redha, Ehsan Hajsafi	Mehdi Jafarpour	18000	Rahim Rahimi Moghadam	5
21	2009-Jan-03	Saba QOM	1–1	Sepahan	Bahman Tahmasebi (20)	–	–	5000	Mohsen Ghahremani	6
22	2009-Jan-16	Sepahan	2–0	Saipa	Moharam Navidkia (24), Moharam Navidkia (65) pen	Hadi Aghili, Jalal Akbari	–	5000	Alborz Hajipour	3
23	2009-Jan-22	Malavan	1–1	Sepahan	Mehdi Jafarpour (72)	Mohsen Bengar, Mehdi Jafarpour, Hossain Papi, Hamed Kiani	–	4000	Shahin Hajbabaei	3
24	2009-Jan-31	Sepahan	1–2	Zob Ahan	Armando Miguel Sá (36)	Hadi Aghili, Ehsan Hajsafi	–	10000	Yadolah Jahanbazi	5
25	2009-Feb-04	Foolad	2–2	Sepahan	Mehdi Jafarpour (5), Jalal Akbari(35)	Mohsen Bengar, Hadi Asghari, Jacques Elong Elong	–	2000	Ghasem Vahedi	5
26	2009-Feb-13	Sepahan	2–1	Rah Ahan	Moharam Navidkia (17), Emad Mohamad Redha (61) pen	Rasoul Khatibi, Jalal Akbari	–	3000	Saeed Bakhshizadeh	4
27	2009-Feb-17	Sepahan	1–0	Bargh	Emad Mohamad Redha (73)	Mohsen Bengar, Mehdi Jafarpour	–	4000	Mahmoud Rafei	4
28	2009-Feb-22	Paykan	0–1	Sepahan	Ehsan Hajsafi (68)	Abbas Mohammadi, Jacques Elong Elong, Emad Mohamad Redha	–	2000	Masoud Moradi	4
29	2009-Feb-27	Sepahan	0–0	Persepolis	–	Mohsen Bengar, Emad Mohamad Redha, Abdolvahab Abolhail	–	20000	Khodadad Afsharian	4
30	2009-Mar-04	Mes	2–1	Sepahan	Farshad Bahadorani (28)	Armando Miguel Sá	–	10000	Hedayat Mombeini	5
31	2009-Apr-03	Damash	1–1	Sepahan	Mehdi Jafarpour (1)	Ehsan Hajsafi, Mehdi Jafarpour, Rasoul Khatibi, Armando Miguel Sá	–	3000	Yadolah Jahanbazi	5
32	2009-Apr-12	Sepahan	2–1	Esteghlal Ahvaz	Ehsan Hajsafi (16), Ahmad Jamshidian (34)	–	Rasoul Khatibi	4,000	Mahmoud Rafei	4
33	2009-Apr-16	Aboomoslem	1–2	Sepahan	Hadi Aghili (65), Emad Mohamad Redha (85) pen	Jacques Elong Elong	–	4,000	Khodadad Afsharian	4
34	2009-Apr-26	Sepahan	0–0	Moghavemat	–	Farshad Bahadorani	–	2,000	Saeed Bakhshizadeh	4

=== Results by round ===
Round	1	2	3	4	5	6	7	8	9	10	11	12	13	14	15	16	17	18	19	20	21	22	23	24	25	26	27	28	29	30	31	32	33	34
Ground	A	H	A	H	A	H	A	H	A	A	H	A	H	H	A	H	A	H	H	H	A	H	A	H	A	H	H	A	H	A	A	H	A	H
Result	D	W	D	W	D	D	L	W	W	D	L	L	W	D	W	W	L	D	D	W	D	W	D	L	D	W	W	W	D	L	D	W	W	D
Position	11	5	5	6	7	8	12	8	6	4	10	10	8	7	4	4	6	6	6	5	6	3	3	5	5	4	4	4	4	5	5	4	4	4

Updated to match(es) played on 26 Apr 2009. Source: "Ipl".
A = Away; H = Home; W = Win; D = Draw; L = Loss

=== Results summary ===
Overall								Home						Away					
Pld	W	D	L	GF	GA	GD	Pts	W	D	L	GF	GA	GD	W	D	L	GF	GA	GD
34	14	14	6	46	34	+12	56	10	6	2	25	14	+11	4	8	4	21	20	+1

=== League standings ===
Pos	Team	Pld	W	D	L	GF	GA	GD	Pts	Qualification or relegation
2	Zob Ahan	34	19	9	6	58	42	+16	66	Qualification for the 2010 AFC Champions League
3	Mes	34	17	10	7	54	36	+18	61	Qualification for the 2010 AFC Champions League
4	Sepahan	34	14	14	6	46	34	+12	56	Qualification for the 2010 AFC Champions League
5	Persepolis	34	15	10	9	50	41	+9	55	
6	Saba	34	12	17	5	49	36	+13	53	

Updated to match(es) played on 1 September 2018. Source: IPL Stats, Soccerway
Rules for classification: 1) Points; 2) Goal difference; 3) Goals scored.

=== Top scorers ===
==== Goal scorers ====
14

- (Iraq) Emad Mohammed

6

- (Iran) Ehsan Hajsafi

4

- (Iran) Hadi Asghari
- (Iran) Moharram Navidkia
- (Iran) Mehdi Jafarpour
- (Iran) Ahmad Jamshidian

3

- (Iran) Bahman Tahmasebi

1

- (Iran) Jalal Akbari
- (Iran) Hamed Kiani
- (Iran) Farshad Bahadorani
- (Iran) Hadi Aghily
- (Mozambique) Armando Sá

==== Cards ====
Player	Yellow card	Yellow card Red card	Red card
(Iran) Mohsen Bengar	7	1	0
(Iran) Mehdi Jafarpour	5	1	0
(Mozambique) Armando Sá	6	0	0
(Iran) Jalal Akbari	5	0	0
(Iran) Ehsan Hajsafi	5	0	0
(Iran) Ahmad Jamshidian	5	0	0
(Iraq) Abdul-Wahab Abu Al-Hail	5	0	0
(Iraq) Emad Mohammed	5	0	0
(Iran) Hadi Aghily	3	1	0
(Iran) Farshad Bahadorani	2	0	2
(Iran) Rasoul Khatibi	1	0	1
(Iran) Rahman Ahmadi	2	0	0
(Cameroon) Jacques Elong Elong	2	0	0
(Iran) Hamid Azizzadeh	1	0	0
(Iran) Mehdi Karimian	1	0	0
(Iran) Hamed Kiani	1	0	0
(Iran) Hossein Papi	1	0	0
(Iran) Amir Saadati	1	0	0
(Iran) Bahman Tahmasebi	1	0	0
(Iran) Hadi Asghari	1	0	0
(Iran) Abbas Mohammadi	1	0	0

==== Matches played ====
25

- (Iran) Jalal Akbari

== Hazfi Cup 2008–09 ==
Round	Date	Home	Score	Away	Venue	Goal	Yellow card	Red card	Fans	Ref
1/16	2008-Nov-24	Sepahan	7–1	Mogavemat Mazandaran	Foolad Shahr /Esfahan	Jalal Ali Mohamammadi 14' 64'; Ahmad Jamshidian 65' 67' 90+1'; Ehsan Hajsafi 84' 90+3'	Farshad Bahadorani	-	1,000	Esmaeel Ameri
1/8	2009-Apr-30	Persepolis	1–0	Sepahan	Azadi /Tehran	-	Mohsen Bengar	-	70,000	Mohsen Torky

=== Bracket ===
Quarterfinals		Semifinals		Finals
Sepahan	7
Mogavemat Mazandaran	1	Sepahan	0
Sanaye talaee	1	Persepolis	1
Persepolis	3			Persepolis
Payam Mashhad	3			Pas Hamedan
Shodaye Kelar Aabad	0	Payam Mashhad	0
Shahrdari Yasuj	0	Pas Hamedan	4
Pas Hamedan	3

=== Scorers in Hazfi Cup 2008/09 ===
Last updated Nov 24 2008

==== Goalscorers ====
3

- (Iran) Ahmad Jamshidian

2

- (Iran) Jalal Ali Mohamammadi
- (Iran) Ehsan Hajsafi

==== Cards ====
Player	Yellow card	Yellow card Red card	Red card
(Iran) Farshad Bahadorani	1	0	0
(Iran) Mohsen Bengar	1	0	0

== Scorers in 2008–09 season ==
Last updated Apr 16 2009

=== Goalscorers ===
14

- (Iraq) Emad Mohammed

== Asian Champions League 2009 ==
=== Group D ===
Pos	Team	Pld	W	D	L	GF	GA	GD	Pts	Qualification	ETT	BUN	SEP	SHB
1	(Saudi Arabia) Al-Ettifaq	6	4	0	2	15	8	+7	12	Advance to knockout stage	—	4–0	2–1	4–1
2	(Uzbekistan) Bunyodkor	6	2	2	2	5	9	−4	8	Advance to knockout stage	2–1	—	2–2	0–0
3	(Iran) Sepahan	6	2	1	3	9	7	+2	7		3–0	0–1	—	2–0
4	(United Arab Emirates) Al-Shabab	6	2	1	3	6	11	−5	7		1–4	2–0	2–1	—

Source: WorldFootball.net

=== Sepahan schedule ACL 2009 ===
2009-03-11
15:30

Sepahan (Iran)	2–0	(United Arab Emirates) Al-Shabab Al-Arabi
Jafarpour 2'; Sá 90+3'	Report

Foolad Shahr Stadium, Esfahan
Attendance: 15,000
Referee: (Singapore) Abdul Malik Bashir

2009-03-18
20:00

Al-Ettifaq (Saudi Arabia)	2–1	(Iran) Sepahan
Abdulrahman Al-Qahtani 64'; Hamad Muhanna 86'	Report	Khatibi 45+2'

Prince Mohamed bin Fahd Stadium, Dammam
Attendance: 7,000
Referee: (South Korea) Kim Dong-Jin

2009-04-08
18:00

Bunyodkor (Uzbekistan)	2–2	(Iran) Sepahan
Salomov 25'; Ashurmatov 74'	Report	Aghili 45+2'; Emad Mohammed 61'

JAR Stadium, Tashkent
Attendance: 9,000
Referee: (Japan) Minoru Tojo

2009-04-21
16:00

Sepahan (Iran)	0–1	(Uzbekistan) Bunyodkor
	Report	Kapadze 19'

Foolad Shahr Stadium, Esfahan
Attendance: 10,000
Referee: (China) Sun Baojie

2009-05-05
20:30

Al-Shabab Al-Arabi (United Arab Emirates)	2–1	(Iran) Sepahan
Mguni 1'; Saad Mubarak 51'	Report	Emad Mohammed 70'

Al-Maktoum Stadium, Dubai
Attendance: 720
Referee: (Australia) Matthew Breeze

19 May 2009
17:00 (UTC+4:30)

Sepahan (Iran)	3–0	(Saudi Arabia) Al-Ettifaq
Papi 2'; Asghari 52'; Azizzadeh 81'	Report

Foolad Shahr Stadium, Esfahan
Attendance: 400
Referee: (Japan) Yuichi Nishimura

=== Scorers in ACLeague 2009 ===
==== Goalscorers ====
2

- (Iraq) Emad Mohammed

1

- (Iran) Hadi Aghily
- (Iran) Mehdi Jafarpour
- (Iran) Rasoul Khatibi
- (Iran) Hossein Papi
- (Iran) Hadi Asghari
- (Iran) Hamid Azizzadeh
- (Mozambique) Armando Sá

==== Cards ====
Player	Yellow card	Yellow card Red card	Red card
(Iran) Mohsen Bengar	1	0	1
(Iran) Ahmad Jamshidian	2	0	0
(Iran) Hadi Aghili	2	0	0
(Iran) Mehdi Jafarpour	2	0	0
(Iraq) Emad Mohammed	2	0	0
(Iran) Jalal Akbari	1	0	0
(Iran) Rahman Ahmadi	1	0	0
(Iran) Rasoul Khatibi	1	0	0
(Iran) Ebrahim Lovinian	0	1	0
(Iran) Ehsan Hajsafi	1	0	0
(Cameroon) Jacques Elong Elong	1	0	0
(Mozambique) Armando Sá	1	0	0

== Squad changes during 2008/09 season ==
=== In ===
No.	Position	Player	Age	Moving from	League	Transfer Window
20	FW	(Iran) Ahmad Jamshidian	24	Rah Ahan	Iran Pro League	Summer
32	FW	(Iran) Miad Abazeri		Sepahan Novin	Azadegan League	Summer
24	DF	(Iran) Mohammad Reza Zare		Sepahan Novin	Azadegan League	Summer
18	DF	(Iran) Mehdi Karimian		Sepahan Novin	Azadegan League	Summer
14	DF	(Iran) Hamed Kiani		Niroye Zamini	Azadegan League	Summer
11	FW	(Iran) Hadi Asghari	27	Rah Ahan	Iran Pro League	Summer
2	DF	(Iran) Amir Saadati	26	Damash Iranian	Azadegan League	Summer
16	FW	(Iran) Bahman Tahmasbi	28	Moghavemat	Iran Pro League	Summer
22	GK	(Iran) Rahman Ahmadi	28	Saipa	Iran Pro League	Summer
TBA	MF	(Iran) Ali Molaei	24	Mes	Iran Pro League	Summer
21	DF	(Mozambique) Armando Sá	32	Foolad	Azadegan League	Summer
9	MF	(Iran) Mehdi Jafarpour		Pas	Iran Pro League	Summer
40	MF	(Cameroon) Jacques Elong Elong	23	Persepolis	Iran Pro League	Summer
33	FW	(Iran) Rasoul Khatibi	30	Emirates	UAE League	Winter

=== Out ===
No.	Position	Player	Age	Moving to	League	Transfer Window
18	MF	(Iran) Mohsen Hamidi	22	Pas	Iran Pro League	Summer
9	MF	(Georgia (country)) Jaba Mujiri	28	FC Sioni Bolnisi	Umaglesi Liga	Summer
35	MF	(Iraq) Haitham Kadhim	25	Esteghlal Ahvaz	Iran Pro League	Summer
24	GK	(Iran) Masoud Homami	25	Moghavemat	Iran Pro League	Summer
10	MF	(Iran) Hojatolah Zadmahmoud	25	Foolad	Iran Pro League	Summer
11	MF	(Iran) Hossein Kazemi	28	Esteghlal	Iran Pro League	Summer
22	GK	(Iran) Mohammad Savari	23	Esteghlal Ahnvaz	Iran Pro League	Summer
21	MF	(Iran) Saeid Bayat	32	Aboomoslem	Iran Pro League	Summer
16	DF	(Iran) Mohammad Ealivand	23	-	-	Summer
15	GK	(Iran) Amirhossein Sadeghzadeh	18	-	-	Summer
23	FW	(Iran) Seyed Mehdi Seyed Salehi	28	Paykan	Iran Pro League	Summer
19	MF	(Iran) Amir Radi	25	-	-	Summer
