= List of Sepahan players =

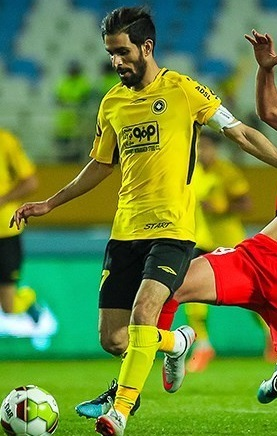
Hossein Papi lies first in the all-time appearance list with 257.

This is a list of players who have played for Sepahan Football Club.

== List of players ==
- (France) Steven Nzonzi
- (Iran) Ahmad Reza Abedzadeh
- (Iraq) Abdul-Wahab Abu Al-Hail
- (Iran) Abbas Aghaei
- (Iran) Hamid Azizadeh
- (Iran) Farshad Bahadorani
- (Iran) Saeid Bayat
- (Nigeria) Kabir Bello
- (Iran) Mohsen Bengar
- (Iran) Edmond Bezik
- (Iran) Ehsan Hajysafi
- (Iran) Mohsen Hamidi
- (Uzbekistan) Fozil Musaev
- (Iran) Masoud Homami
- (Iran) Abolhassan Jafari
- (Iran) Hadi Jafari
- (Iran) Mahmoud Karimi
- (Iran) Hossein Kazemi
- (Iran) Rasoul Khatibi
- (Iran) Ebrahim Loveinian
- (Iran) Mehrdad Minavand
- (Iran) Abbas Mohammadi
- (Iran) Jalaladin Ali Mohammadi
- (Iraq) Emad Mohammed
- (Iran) Ahmad Momenzadeh
- (Georgia (country)) Jaba Mujiri
- (Iran) Moharram Navidkia
- (Iran) Mohammad Noori
- (Iran) Hossein Papi
- (Armenia) Armenak Petrosyan
- (Iran) Amir Radi
- (Iran) Mehdi Rahmati
- (Iran) Mohammad Savari
- (Iran) Seyed Mohammad Salehi
- (Iran) Hamid Shafiei
- (Iran) Ali Shojaei
- (Armenia) Levon Stepanyan
- (Slovakia) Kamil Susko
- (Iran) Reza Talabeh
- (Iran) Hojatolah Zadmahmoud
