= 2007 AFC Champions League final =

- Event: 2007 AFC Champions League
Sepahan	Urawa Red Diamonds
(Iran)	(Japan)
1	3

First leg
Sepahan	Urawa Red Diamonds
1	1
- Date: 7 November 2007
- Venue: Foolad Shahr Stadium, Fooladshahr
- Referee: Subkhiddin Mohd Salleh
- Attendance: 30,000

Second leg
Urawa Red Diamonds	Sepahan
2	0
- Date: 14 November 2007
- Venue: Saitama Stadium, Saitama
- Referee: Ravshan Irmatov
- Attendance: 59,034

The 2007 AFC Champions League final was a two-legged association football tie to determine the 2007 champions of Asian club football. Urawa Red Diamonds from Japan defeated Iran's Sepahan 3-1 on aggregate to take the title. The first leg took place on 7 November 2007 at 16:00 local time (UTC+3:30) at Foolad Shahr Stadium in Fooladshahr, Isfahan in Iran and the second leg took place on 14 November 2007 at 19:20 local time (UTC+9) at Saitama Stadium, Saitama, Japan.

This was the first final to feature clubs from Iran and Japan. This was the first AFC Champions League final involving an Iranian club, and the first in an Asian top club football competition since PAS Tehran in the 1992–93 Asian Club Championship. The winners, Urawa Red Diamonds, received US$600,000 prize money and qualified to represent Asia in the 2007 FIFA Club World Cup. Although they were defeated, Sepahan still competed in the FIFA Club World Cup by replacing the normal host country berth, which is reserved for the J. League champions.

== Format ==
The rules for the final were exactly the same as for the previous knockout rounds. The tie was contested over two legs with away goals deciding the winner if the two teams were level on goals after the second leg. If the teams could still not be separated at that stage then extra time would have been played with a penalty shootout taking place if the teams were still level after that.

== Route to the final ==
=== Sepahan ===
Opponents	Round	H/A	Score^{1}	Sepahan goalscorers
(Syria) Al Ittihad	Group Stage	H	2–1	Mehdi Seyed-Salehi(2)
(Saudi Arabia) Al Shabab	Group Stage	A	1–0	Mehdi Seyed-Salehi
(United Arab Emirates) Al Ain	Group Stage	A	2–3	Mehdi Seyed-Salehi, Emad Mohammed
(United Arab Emirates) Al Ain	Group Stage	H	1–1	Hossein Papi
(Syria) Al Ittihad	Group Stage	A	5–0	Abdul-Wahab Abu Al-Hail, Mohammad Nouri(2), Emad Mohammed(2)
(Saudi Arabia) Al Shabab	Group Stage	H	1–0	Mehdi Seyed-Salehi
(Japan) Kawasaki Frontale	Quarter Final, Leg 1	H	0–0	
(Japan) Kawasaki Frontale	Quarter Final, Leg 2	A	0–0(p5–4)	
(United Arab Emirates) Al Wahda	Semi Final, Leg 1	H	3–1	Mahmoud Karimi(2), Moharram Navidkia
(United Arab Emirates) Al Wahda	Semi Final, Leg 2	A	0–0	

^{1}Sepahan's goals always recorded first.

=== Urawa Red Diamonds ===
Opponents	Round	H/A	Score^{1}	Urawa Reds goalscorers
(Indonesia) Persik Kediri	Group Stage	H	3–0	Yamada, Nagai, Ono
(Australia) Sydney FC	Group Stage	A	2–2	Ponte, Nagai
(China) Shanghai Shenhua	Group Stage	H	1–0	Abe
(China) Shanghai Shenhua	Group Stage	A	0–0	
(Indonesia) Persik Kediri	Group Stage	A	3–3	Ono, Ponte, Abe
(Australia) Sydney FC	Group Stage	H	0–0	
(South Korea) Jeonbuk Motors	Quarter Final, Leg 1	H	2–1	Hasebe, Tatsuya Tanaka
(South Korea) Jeonbuk Motors	Quarter Final, Leg 2	A	2–0	Tatsuya Tanaka, Own Goal
(South Korea) Seongnam Ilhwa	Semi Final, Leg 1	A	2–2	Tatsuya Tanaka, Ponte
(South Korea) Seongnam Ilhwa	Semi Final, Leg 2	H	2–2(p5–3)	Washington, Hasebe

^{1}Urawa Red Diamonds' goals always recorded first.

== Final summary ==
Team 1	Agg.	Team 2	1st leg	2nd leg
Sepahan (Iran)	1–3	(Japan) Urawa Red Diamonds	1–1	0–2

=== First leg ===
7 November 2007
16:00 (UTC+3:30)

Sepahan (Iran)	1 – 1	(Japan) Urawa Red Diamonds
Mahmoud Karimi 47'		Robson Ponte 45'

Foolad Shahr Stadium, Fooladshahr
Attendance: 30,000
Referee: (Malaysia) Subkhiddin Mohd Salleh

Sepahan	Urawa Reds

SEPAHAN:
GK	1	(Iran) Abbas Mohammadi
DF	5	(Iran) Hadi Aghili
DF	8	(Iran) Mohsen Bengar
DF	17	(Georgia (country)) Jaba Mujiri
MF	4	(Iran) Moharram Navidkia (c)
MF	6	(Iran) Jalal Akbari		(substituted off) 46'
MF	12	(Iraq) Abdul-Wahab Abu Al-Hail
MF	21	(Iran) Saeid Bayat
MF	28	(Iran) Ehsan Hajsafi	(yellow card) 60'
FW	13	(Iran) Mahmoud Karimi		(substituted off) 67'
FW	20	(Iraq) Emad Mohammed		(substituted off) 46'
Substitutes:
GK	22	(Iran) Mohammad Savari
GK	24	(Iran) Masoud Homami
DF	2	(Iran) Hamid Azizzadeh
DF	7	(Iran) Farshad Bahadorani
MF	11	(Iran) Hossein Kazemi		(substituted on) 67'
FW	18	(Iran) Mohsen Hamidi		(substituted on) 46'
MF	19	(Iran) Jalaleddin Alimohammadi
FW	23	(Iran) Mehdi Seyed-Salehi
MF	25	(Iran) Ebrahim Loveinian		(substituted on) 46'
MF	29	(Iran) Behzad Soltani
MF	30	(Iran) Hossein Papi
Manager:
(Croatia) Luka Bonačić

URAWA REDS:
GK	23	(Japan) Ryota Tsuzuki
RB	2	(Japan) Keisuke Tsuboi
CB	5	(Brazil) Nenê
CB	17	(Japan) Makoto Hasebe
LB	20	(Japan) Satoshi Horinouchi
CM	13	(Japan) Keita Suzuki (c)
CM	22	(Japan) Yuki Abe
RW	14	(Japan) Tadaaki Hirakawa
AM	10	(Brazil) Robson Ponte
LW	9	(Japan) Yuichiro Nagai	(substituted off) 73'
CF	21	(Brazil) Washington
Substitutes:
GK	1	(Japan) Norihiro Yamagishi
GK	28	(Japan) Nobuhiro Kato
DF	12	(Japan) Shunsuke Tsutsumi
DF	19	(Japan) Hideki Uchidate
MF	3	(Japan) Hajime Hosogai
MF	16	(Japan) Takahito Soma
MF	27	(Japan) Yoshiya Nishizawa
MF	30	(Japan) Masayuki Okano
FW	11	(Japan) Tatsuya Tanaka	(substituted on) 73'
FW	18	(Japan) Junki Koike
Manager:
(Germany) Holger Osieck

=== Second leg ===
14 November 2007
19:20 (UTC+9)

Urawa Red Diamonds (Japan)	2 – 0	(Iran) Sepahan
Yuichiro Nagai 22'; Yuki Abe 71'

Saitama Stadium, Saitama
Attendance: 59,034
Referee: (Uzbekistan) Ravshan Irmatov

Urawa Reds	Sepahan

URAWA REDS:
GK	23	(Japan) Ryota Tsuzuki
RB	2	(Japan) Keisuke Tsuboi
CB	17	(Japan) Makoto Hasebe	(yellow card) 55'
CB	4	(Japan) Marcus Túlio Tanaka
LB	20	(Japan) Satoshi Horinouchi
CM	13	(Japan) Keita Suzuki (c)
CM	22	(Japan) Yuki Abe
RW	14	(Japan) Tadaaki Hirakawa
AM	10	(Brazil) Robson Ponte		(substituted off) 80'
LW	9	(Japan) Yuichiro Nagai		(substituted off) 85'
CF	21	(Brazil) Washington		(substituted off) 89'
Substitutes:
GK	1	(Japan) Norihiro Yamagishi
DF	5	(Brazil) Nenê
DF	12	(Japan) Shunsuke Tsutsumi
DF	19	(Japan) Hideki Uchidate		(substituted on) 80'
MF	16	(Japan) Takahito Soma
MF	30	(Japan) Masayuki Okano		(substituted on) 89'
FW	11	(Japan) Tatsuya Tanaka		(substituted on) 85'
FW	18	(Japan) Junki Koike
Manager:
(Germany) Holger Osieck

SEPAHAN:
GK	1	(Iran) Abbas Mohammadi
DF	5	(Iran) Hadi Aghili
DF	8	(Iran) Mohsen Bengar
DF	17	(Georgia (country)) Jaba Mujiri
MF	4	(Iran) Moharram Navidkia (c)
MF	12	(Iraq) Abdul-Wahab Abu Al-Hail
MF	21	(Iran) Saeid Bayat	(substituted off) 59'
MF	25	(Iran) Ebrahim Loveinian
MF	28	(Iran) Ehsan Hajsafi
FW	18	(Iran) Mohsen Hamidi	(substituted off) 46'
FW	20	(Iraq) Emad Mohammed	(substituted off) 29'
Substitutes:
GK	22	(Iran) Mohammad Savari
GK	24	(Iran) Masoud Homami
DF	2	(Iran) Hamid Azizzadeh
DF	6	(Iran) Jalal Akbari
DF	7	(Iran) Farshad Bahadorani
MF	9	(Iran) Hadi Jafari
MF	11	(Iran) Hossein Kazemi	(substituted on) 59'
MF	19	(Iran) Amir Radi
MF	29	(Iran) Behzad Soltani
MF	30	(Iran) Hossein Papi	(substituted on) 46'
FW	13	(Iran) Mahmoud Karimi	(substituted on) 29'
FW	23	(Iran) Mehdi Seyed-Salehi
Manager:
(Croatia) Luka Bonačić

== See also ==
- 2007 AFC Champions League
- 2007 FIFA Club World Cup
