= 2007 Hazfi Cup final =

- Event: 2006–07 Hazfi Cup
Saba Battery	Sepahan
0	4

First leg
Saba Battery	Sepahan
0	1
- Date: Jun 10, 2007
- Venue: Derakhshan Stadium, Robat Karim
- Referee: Rahim Rahimi Moghadam
- Attendance: 10,000

Second leg
Sepahan	Saba Battery
3	0
- Date: Jun 16, 2007
- Venue: Naghsh Jahan Stadium, Esfahan
- Referee: Mohsen Torky
- Attendance: 30,000

The 2007 Hazfi Cup final was a two-legged football tie in order to determine the 2006–07 Hazfi Cup champion of Iranian football clubs. Saba Battery faced Sepahan in this final game. The first leg took place on June 9, 2007, at 17:00 local time (UTC+3:30) at Derakhshan Stadium in Robat Karim and the second leg took place on June 16, 2007, at 16:30 local time (UTC+3:30) at Naghsh Jahan Stadium, Esfahan.

== Format ==
The rules for the final were exactly the same as the one in the previous knockout rounds. The tie was contested over two legs with away goals deciding the winner if the two teams were level on goals after the second leg. If the teams could still not be separated at that stage, then extra time would have been played with a penalty shootout (taking place if the teams were still level after extra time).

== Route to the final ==
Saba Battery				Round	Sepahan
Opponent	Result	H/A	Saba Battery goalscorers	Second stage	Opponent	Result	H/A	Sepahan goalscorers
Kowsar Tehran	2–1	A	Morteza Asadi, Alen Avdić	1/16 Final	Nozhan Sari	2–0	H	Mehdi Soroshniya (o.g), Hadi Jafari
Bargh Shiraz	2–1	H	Yahya Golmohammadi, Yadollah Akbari	1/8 Final	Saipa	2–0	H	Jalal Akbari, Hadi Aghili
Naft	0–1	A	Amir Hossein Yousefi	Quarter-Final	Tarbiat Yazd	3–2	H	Jaba Mujiri, Saeed Bayat, Hadi Aghili
Paykan Tehran	2–1	H	Alireza Abbasfard, Yadollah Akbari	Semi-Final	Persepolis	4–1	A	Hadi Aghili, Mahmoud Karimi (3)

== Final Summary ==
Team 1	Agg.	Team 2	1st leg	2nd leg
Saba Battery	0-4	Sepahan	0-1	0-3

=== First leg ===
2007-06-10
17:00

Saba Battery	0 – 1	Sepahan
	Report	Hadi Aghili 60' (pen.)

Derakhshan Stadium, Robat Karim
Attendance: 10,000
Referee: Rahim Rahimi Moghadam

Saba Battery:
GK	1	(Bosnia and Herzegovina) Almir Tolja
DF	(Iran) Sohrab Bakhtiarizadeh
DF	(Iran) Yahya Golmohammadi
DF	(Iran) Morteza Kashi	Temporarily suspended
DF	(Iran) Morteza Asadi
DF	(Iran) Saeed Beigi
MF	(Iran) Yadollah Akbari	(substituted off) 86'
MF	(Iran) Amjad Shokohmagham
MF	(Iran) Hamed Hajati	Temporarily suspended	(substituted off) 80'
FW	(Iran) Hamidreza Zohani	Temporarily suspended	(substituted off) 69'
FW	(Iran) Alireza Abbasfard
Substitutes:
MF	(Iran) Mostafa Mehdizadeh	(substituted on) 69'
MF	(Iran) Mohsen Bayat	(substituted on) 80'
FW	(Iran) Saeed Daghighi	(substituted on) 86'
Manager:
(Iran) Mohammad Hossein Ziaei

Sepahan:
GK	(Iran) Mohammad Savari
DF	(Iran) Hadi Aghily	60' (pen.)
DF	(Iran) Mohsen Bengar
DF	(Iran) Jalal Akbari	Temporarily suspended
MF	(Iran) Hadi Jafari
MF	(Iran) Moharram Navidkia	(substituted off) 90+3'
MF	(Iran) Mahmoud Karimi	(substituted off) 81'
MF	(Iran) Javad Maheri	(substituted off) 46'
MF	(Iran) Saeed Bayat	Temporarily suspended
MF	(Iran) Ehsan Hajsafi	Temporarily suspended
FW	(Iran) Mehdi Seyed Salehi	Temporarily suspended
Substitutes:
MF	(Iran) Farshad Bahadorani	(substituted on) 46'
MF	(Iran) Hossein Papi	(substituted on) 81'
DF	(Iran) Hamid Azizzadeh	(substituted on) 90+3'
Manager:
(Croatia) Luka Bonačić

=== Second leg ===
2007-06-16
16:30

Sepahan	3 – 0	Saba Battery
Mahmoud Karimi 44'; Ebrahim Loveinian 55'; Hossein Papi 88'	Report

Naghsh Jahan Stadium, Esfahan
Attendance: 30,000
Referee: Mohsen Torky

Sepahan:
GK	(Iran) Mohammad Savari
DF	(Iran) Hadi Aghily
DF	(Georgia (country)) Jaba Mujiri		(substituted off) 81'
DF	(Iran) Mohsen Bengar
MF	(Iraq) Abdul Wahab Abu Al Hail
MF	(Iran) Ebrahim Loveinian	55'	(substituted off) 60'
MF	(Iran) Hossein Papi	88'
MF	(Iran) Hadi Jafari
MF	(Iran) Farshad Bahadorani
MF	(Iran) Mahmoud Karimi	44'	(substituted off) 77'
FW	(Iran) Mehdi Seyed Salehi
Substitutes:
FW	(Iran) Hamed Rasouli		(substituted on) 60'
MF	(Iran) Mohammad Nouri		(substituted on) 77'
DF	(Iran) Hamid Azizzadeh		(substituted on) 81'
Manager:
(Iran) Mansour Ebrahimzadeh

Saba Battery:
GK	1	(Bosnia and Herzegovina) Almir Tolja
DF	(Iran) Sohrab Bakhtiarizadeh
DF	(Iran) Saeed Beigi
DF	(Iran) Yahya Golmohammadi	Temporarily suspended
MF	(Iran) Mohsen Bayat	Temporarily suspended
MF	(Iran) Mostafa Mehdizadeh	(substituted off) 59'
MF	(Iran) Yadollah Akbari
MF	(Iran) Amjad Shokohmagham	(substituted off) 62'
MF	(Iran) Hamed Hajati
FW	(Iran) Saeed Daghighi
FW	(Iran) Hamidreza Zohani	(substituted off) 46'
Substitutes:
DF	(Bosnia and Herzegovina) Marinko Mačkić	(substituted on) 46'
FW	(Bosnia and Herzegovina) Alen Avdić	(substituted on) 59'
FW	(Iran) Alireza Abbasfard	(substituted on) 69'
Manager:
(Iran) Mohammad Hossein Ziaei

== Champions ==
Champions 2006–07 Hazfi Cup

Third title

== See also ==
- 2006–07 Persian Gulf Cup
- 2006–07 Azadegan League
- 2006–07 Iran Football's 2nd Division
- 2006–07 Iran Football's 3rd Division
- 2006–07 Hazfi Cup
- Iranian Super Cup
