= 2006–07 Hazfi Cup =

Tournament details
- Country: Iran
- Teams: 100

Final positions
- Champions: Sepahan
- Runners-up: Battery

The Hazfi Cup 2006–07 is the 20th staging of Iran's football knockout competition. This tournament has been organised annually by the Football Federation Islamic Republic of Iran.

The champion was Sepanan S.C, after defeat Saba Battery F.C. in both final legs.

== Round of 32 ==
Matches were played between 22 December 2006 and 19 January 2007.

Home team	Score	Away team
Kowsar Tehran	1–2	Saba Battery
Mes Kerman	5–0	Petroshimi
Rah Ahan	1–1	Bargh Tehran
Bargh progress 4–3 on penalties.
Foolad	2–2	Sepahan Novin
Foolad progress 5–3 on penalties.
Paykan	1–1	Nirou Moharekeh
Paykan progress 4–2 on penalties.
Saipa	2–0	Zob Ahan Ardebil
Esteghlal Ahvaz	3–0	Sanaye Arak
Damash Iranian	1–1	Zob Ahan
Damash progress 5–3 on penalties.
Sepahan	2–0	Nozhan Sari
Aboomoslem	0–2	Sanat Naft
Sanati Kaveh	2–4	Persepolis
Fajr Sepasi	1–2	Tarbiat Yazd
Malavan	1–1	Kimia Roshd
Malavan progress on penalties.
Bargh Shiraz	2–1	Sorkhpooshan
Shamoushak	1–1	Pas
Pas progress on penalties.
Moghavemat Basij	2–1	Esteghlal

== Round of 16 ==
Matches were played between 19 January and 8 April 2007.

Home team	Score	Away team
Sepahan	2–0	Saipa
Tarbiat Yazd	2–0	Malavan
Sanat	1–0	Foolad
Mes Kerman	1–2	Paykan
Bargh Tehran	0–0	Damash Iranian
Bargh progress 5–4 on penalties.
Battery F.C.	2–1	Bargh Shiraz
Persepolis	2–0	Moghavemat Basij
PAS	1–4	Esteghlal Ahvaz

== Quarter-finals ==
Matches were played between 13 February and 8 April 2007.

Home team	Score	Away team
Naft	0–1	Battery
Sepahan	3–2	Tarbiat Yazd
Bargh Tehran	2–2	Persepolis
Persepolis progress 5–3 on penalties.
Paykan	2–1	Esteghlal Ahvaz

== Semifinals ==
Matches were played on 1 June 2007.

Home team	Score	Away team
Persepolis	1–4 (a.e.t.)	Sepahan
Battery	2–1 (a.e.t.)	Paykan Tehran

== Final ==
Team 1	Agg.	Team 2	1st leg	2nd leg
Battery	0–4	Sepahan	0–1	0–3

=== First leg ===
10 June 2007
17:00

Saba Battery	0–1	Sepahan
		Aghili 59' (pen.)

Derakhshan Stadium, Robat Karim
Attendance: 10,000
Referee: Rahim Rahimi Moghadam

=== Second leg ===
16 June 2007
16:30

Sepahan	3–0	Saba Battery
Karimi 44'; Loveinian 55'; Papi 88'

Naghsh Jahan Stadium, Esfahan
Attendance: 30,000
Referee: Mohsen Torky

== See also ==
- 2006–07 Persian Gulf Cup
- 2006–07 Azadegan League
- 2006–07 Iran Football's 2nd Division
- 2006–07 Iran Football's 3rd Division
- 2007 Hazfi Cup Final
- Iranian Super Cup
