= Side midfielder =

Side midfielder in football (soccer) is a player who plays on the side of the midfield. The more common term for this is wide midfielder or winger.

- For the main article on the midfield position, see midfielder
- For the article on wingers, see winger (sport)
