= Hemat Abedinejad =

Iranian footballer

Personal information
- Full name: Hemat Abedinejad
- Date of birth: 23 June 1980 (age 46)
- Place of birth: Iran
- Position: Defender

Team information
- Current team: Pas Hamedan
- Number: 2

Senior career*
Years	Team	Apps	(Gls)
2005–2009	Bargh Shiraz	85	(1)
2009–	Pas Hamedan	16	(1)
- * Club domestic league appearances and goals as of 22:04, 3 September 2010(UTC) ‡ National team caps and goals as of 16 April 2010

Hemat Abedinejad (born June 23, 1980) is an Iranian footballer. He currently plays for Pas Hamedan F.C. in the IPL.

== Club career ==
In 2009, Abedinejad joined Pas Hamedan F.C.

Club performance			League		Cup		Continental		Total	
Season	Club	League	Apps	Goals	Apps	Goals	Apps	Goals	Apps	Goals
Iran			League		Hazfi Cup		Asia		Total	
2005–06	Bargh Shiraz	Persian Gulf Cup	24	1			-	-		
2006–07	Bargh Shiraz	Persian Gulf Cup	14	0			-	-		
2007–08	Bargh Shiraz	Persian Gulf Cup	21	0	2	0	-	-	23	0
2008–09	Bargh Shiraz	Persian Gulf Cup	26	0			-	-		
2009–10	Pas	Persian Gulf Cup	12	1		0	-	-		0
2010–11	Pas	Persian Gulf Cup	4	0	0	0	-	-	4	0
Total	Iran		101	2			0	0		
Career total			101	2			0	0		

- Assists

Season	Team	Assists
2010–11	Pas	1
