= Morteza Aziz-Mohammadi =

Iranian footballer (born 1985)

Personal information
- Date of birth: 6 August 1985 (age 41)
- Place of birth: Tehran, Iran
- Height: 1.84 m (6 ft 0 in)
- Position: Midfielder

Youth career
- 2000–2006: Paykan

Senior career*
Years	Team	Apps	(Gls)
2006–2009	Paykan	74	(6)
2009–2011	Pas Hamedan	38	(3)
2011–2012	Shahin Bushehr	29	(2)
2012–2013	Tarbiat Yazd		
2013–2014	Alvand Hamedan	14	(3)
2014–2016	Giti Pasand	45	(8)
2016	Mes Rafsanjan	2	(0)
2017–2018	Esteghlal Jonoub		

International career
2007	Iran U23	2	(0)
- * Club domestic league appearances and goals

Morteza Aziz-Mohammadi (Persian: مرتض عزیزمحمدی; born 8 August 1985) is an Iranian former football player.

== Club career ==
In 2009, Aziz-Mohammadi joined PAS Hamedan after spending the previous 3 seasons at Paykan F.C. On 14 July 2011, he was joined to the Shahin Bushehr.

Club performance			League		Cup		Continental		Total	
Season	Club	League	Apps	Goals	Apps	Goals	Apps	Goals	Apps	Goals
Iran			League		Hazfi Cup		Asia		Total	
2006–07	Paykan	Pro League	18	4	1	0	-	-	19	4
2007–08	Paykan	Pro League	30	2			-	-		
2008–09	Paykan	Pro League	27	1	1	0	-	-	28	1
2009–10	Pas	Pro League	14	0			-	-		
2010–11	Pas	Pro League	2	0	1	0	-	-	3	0
2011–12	Shahin Bushehr	Pro League	27	5	2	0	-	-	29	5
2014–15	Giti Pasand	Division 1	20	3	2	0	-	-	20	-
2015–16	Giti Pasand	Division 1	15	4	0	0	-	-	15	4
Career total			117	22			0	0		

- Assist Goals

Season	Team	Assists
09–10	Pas Hamedan	1
10–11	Pas Hamedan	1
11-12	Shahin Bushehr	1

== Honours ==
=== Club ===
- Hazfi Cup
  - Runner up:1
    - 2011–12 with Shahin Bushehr
