= Majid Khodabandelou =

Iranian footballer

Personal information
- Full name: Majid Khodabandelou
- Date of birth: January 25, 1986 (age 40)
- Place of birth: Tehran, Iran
- Position: Midfielder

Youth career
- 1999–2006: Paykan

Senior career*
Years	Team	Apps	(Gls)
2006–2007	Paykan	3	(0)
2007–2009	Mes Kerman	54	(5)
2009–2011	Peykan	61	(7)
2011–2012	Mes Kerman	5	(0)
2012–2013	Gahar Zagros	22	(1)
2013–2015	Paykan	15	(0)
2015-2017	Shahrdari Ardabil	25	(2)
2017-2018	Shahin Bushehr	6	(1)
2018-2020	Damash Gilan	0	(0)
- * Club domestic league appearances and goals as of 14 April 2022

Majid Khodabandelou (born January 26, 1986) is a former professional association football player who played almost 200 matches in the top three tiers of the Iranian football league system. He played for seven different clubs in a career that spanned 14 years.

== Club career ==
He began his career in the youth academy at Paykan, starting there in 1999.

=== Paykan (2006-2007) ===
In 2006, he was promoted to the senior team for Paykan, but only made three appearances for the club before being transferred to Mes Kerman.

=== Mes Kerman (2007-2009) ===
He transferred to Mes Kerman on 1 July 2007, and scored his first professional goal in a match against Sepahan that December. He would go on to score four more goals with Mes Kerman, before being transferred back to Paykan.

=== Paykan (2009-2011) ===
Exactly two years after being transferred to Mes Kerman, Khodabandelou transferred back to Paykan. In his second stint with the club, he would score seven goals in 61 appearances.

=== Mes Kerman (2011) ===
In his return to Mes Kerman, he made just 5 appearances, before being transferred on 1 January 2012.

=== Gahar (2012) ===
Khodabandelou scored just a single goal in his time with Gahar, before transferring back to Paykan in July.

=== Paykan (2013-2015) ===
He returned to a Paykan that had been relegated to the 2nd division of the Iranian football pyramid, the Azadegan League. At the end of his first season, the team was promoted to the Pro League.

=== End of career and retirement ===
After his final spell with Paykan, Khodabandelou transferred to Shahrdari Ardabil, where he made 25 appearances and scored two goals in his first season. In his second season, he made no appearances, and transferred to Shahin Bushehr. He played his final professional game and scored his last professional goal in 2018. He did transfer to Damash Gilan but made no appearances with the side and retired after two seasons with them.

=== Club career statistics ===
As of 14 April 2022

Club performance			League		Cup		Continental		Total	
Season	Club	League	Apps	Goals	Apps	Goals	Apps	Goals	Apps	Goals
Iran			League		Hazfi Cup		Asia		Total	
2006-07	Paykan	Pro League	3	0	–	–	–	–	3	0
2007-08	Mes Kerman	Pro League	31	3	1	0	–	–	32	3
2008-09	Mes Kerman	Pro League	23	2	–	–	–	–	23	2
2009–10	Paykan	Pro League	29	4	–	–	–	–	29	4
2010–11	Paykan	Pro League	32	3	1	0	–	–	35	3
2011–12	Mes Kerman	Pro League	5	0	0	0	–	–	5	0
2012–13	Gahar	Pro League	22	1	–	–	–	–	22	1
2013–14	Paykan	Azadegan	13	0	1	0	–	–	13	0
2014–15	Paykan	Pro League	2	0	0	0	–	–	2	0
2014–15	Sanat Naft	Azadegan	3	0	–	–	–	–	3	0
2015-16	Shahrdari Ardabil	Azadegan	25	2	–	–	–	–	25	2
2016-17	Shahrdari Ardabil	Azadegan	–	–	–	–	–	–	–	–
2016-17	Shahin Bushehr	Azadegan	–	–	–	–	–	–	–	–
2017-18	Shahin Bushehr	Azadegan	6	1	–	–	–	–	6	1
2018-19	Damash Gilan	Division 2	–	–	–	–	–	–	–	–
2019-20	Damash Gilan	Azadegan	–	–	–	–	–	–	–	–
Career total			194	16	3	0	0	0	197	16

- Assist Goals

Season	Team	Assists
10–11	Paykan	1
11–12	Mes Kerman	0
