= Saba Battery Club =

Iranian sports club

Saba Battery Club (also Saba Battery Physical and Cultural Gym) is an Iranian sports club based in Tehran, Iran. The club was founded in 2002.

== Teams ==
- Saba Battery Football Club, competing in the Iran Pro League
