= Rouhollah Ataei =

Iranian footballer

Personal information
- Date of birth: 11 September 1983 (age 43)
- Place of birth: Iran – Qazvin
- Position: Forward

Team information
- Current team: Bragh Shiraz

Senior career*
Years	Team	Apps	(Gls)
2007–2008	Shirin Faraz	24	(5)
2008–2009	Mes Kerman	9	(1)
2008	→Tractor Sazi (loan)	?	(2)
2009–2011	Paykan	21	(0)
2011–2012	Shahrdari Bandar Abbas	4	(0)
2012–	Bragh Shiraz		(3)
- * Club domestic league appearances and goals as of June 1, 2010 (UTC) ‡ National team caps and goals as of June 1, 2010

Rouhollah Ataei (born September 11, 1983 Iran – Qazvin) is an Iranian footballer. He plays for Paykan in the IPL.

== Club career ==
Ataei has been with Paykan since 2009.

=== Club Career Statistics ===
Last Update 29 August 2010

Club performance			League	
Season	Club	League	Apps	Goals
Iran			League	
2007–08	Shirin Faraz	Persian Gulf Cup	24	5
2008–09	Mes	Persian Gulf Cup	9	1
2009–10	Paykan	Persian Gulf Cup	18	0
2010–11	Paykan	Persian Gulf Cup	3	0
Total	Iran		54	6
Career total			54	6

- Assist Goals

Season	Team	Assists
10-11	Paykan	0
