= Kabir Bello =

Nigerian footballer

Personal information
- Full name: Kabir Prince Bello
- Date of birth: 21 July 1983 (age 43)
- Place of birth: Lagos, Nigeria
- Height: 1.83 m (6 ft 0 in)
- Position: Forward

Youth career
- 1998–1999: Ikeja United
- 1999–2000: Sunlarg

Senior career*
Years	Team	Apps	(Gls)
2000–2001	Gombe United		
2001–2002	Jasper United		
2002–2003	Gabros International		
2003–2004	Sanat Mes Kerman		
2004–2008	Sepahan	25	(5)
2008–2011	Persitara North Jakarta	60	(20)
2011–2012	Sheikh Russel		
2012–2015	PSPS Pekanbaru	12	(3)

International career
2004–2005	Nigeria U-23		
- * Club domestic league appearances and goals

Kabir Prince Bello (born 21 July 1983) is a Nigerian former footballer who plays as a striker. He also had stints with Sepahan previously, and played 2 games in FIFA Club World Cup 2007 with them.

== Personal life ==
He is a convert to Shi'a Islam.
