= Midfield =

Part of a sports field about halfway between the end lines

In many sports, midfield is the part of a sports field that is near the line that is equally far from the end lines. In American football it is the part of the field near the 50-yard line; in association football (soccer) and field hockey it is the part of the field that is between but roughly equally far from the two goalies. In association football, a player who is a midfielder plays much of the game in the midfield, in contrast to a forward who plays closer to the opponent's goalkeeper or a defender who plays closer to their team's goalkeeper.

In these sports, center field is the part of the sports field that is near the line that connects the midpoints of the end lines. That is, in association football or field hockey, it is the part of the field near the line that could be drawn to connect the two goalies; in American football it would connect the two uprights. In association football, a player who is a "center forward", "center midfielder" or "center back" plays much of the game along this line, whereas, from the perspective of the player's goalkeeper's view, other players will be "left" or "right".

In contrast, the term midfield in baseball and cricket is used to describe the area between the infield (within the bases or near the wickets) and the outfield. In baseball, center field is the part of the outfield between left field and right field, and can be reached by going in a line from home plate past second base into the outfield.

In motorsport, particularly in Formula One racing, the midfield refers to the teams who are typically in the middle of the racing order, in front of the backmarkers but not usually competitive enough to challenge for a win.

== See also ==
- Midfielder
