= Shahid Derakhshan Stadium =

Multi-purpose stadium in Robat Karim, Iran

Derakhshan Stadium
- Interactive map of Derakhshan Stadium
- Full name: Shahid Derakhshan Stadium
- Location: Robat Karim, Tehran, Iran
- Owner: Saba Battery F.C.
- Operator: Saba Battery F.C.
- Capacity: 12,000 (Football)
- Surface: Grass

Construction
- Built: 2002
- Opened: 2002

Tenant
- Saba Battery F.C.

The Derakhshan Stadium is a multi-purpose stadium in Robat Karim, Iran. It is currently used mostly for football matches and is owned by, and the home of, Saba Battery F.C. The stadium holds 12,000 people.
