= Hojat Zadmahmoud =

Iranian footballer

Hojatolah Zadmahmoud
Personal information
- Full name: Hojatolah Zadmahmoud
- Date of birth: September 13, 1983 (age 43)
- Place of birth: Iran
- Height: 1.83 m (6 ft 0 in)
- Position: Midfielder

Team information
- Current team: Shahin Bushehr

Senior career*
Years	Team	Apps	(Gls)
2004–2007	Esteghlal Ahvaz	72	(10)
2007–2008	Sepahan	19	(5)
2008–2010	Foolad	33	(5)
2010–2011	Gostaresh Foolad	18	(1)
2011–	Shahin Bushehr	0	(0)
- * Club domestic league appearances and goals as of 04 May 2011

Hojatolah Zadmahmoud (Persian: حجت‌الله زادمحمود, born September 13, 1983) is an Iranian football midfielder who currently plays for Gostaresh Foolad F.C. in the Azadegan League.

== Club career ==
=== Club career statistics ===
Last update 4 May 2011

Club performance			League		Cup		Continental		Total	
Season	Club	League	Apps	Goals	Apps	Goals	Apps	Goals	Apps	Goals
Iran			League		Hazfi Cup		Asia		Total	
2004–05	Esteghlal Ahvaz	Persian Gulf Cup	28	8			-	-		
2005–06	Esteghlal Ahvaz	Persian Gulf Cup	23	1			-	-		
2006–07	Esteghlal Ahvaz	Persian Gulf Cup	21	1			-	-		
2007–08	Sepahan	Persian Gulf Cup	19	5		0	5	0		5
2008–09	Foolad	Persian Gulf Cup	29	5			-	-		
2009–10	Foolad	Persian Gulf Cup	4	0	0	0	-	-	4	0
2010–11	Gostaresh	Azadegan	18	1			-	-		
2011–12	Shahin Bushehr	Persian Gulf Cup	0	0	0	0	-	-	0	0
Total	Iran		142	21			5	0		
Career total			142	21			5	0		

- Assist Goals

Season	Team	Assists
05–06	Esteghlal Ahvaz	2
08–09	Foolad	1
09–10	Foolad	0
