= Hadi Aghily =

Iranian footballer

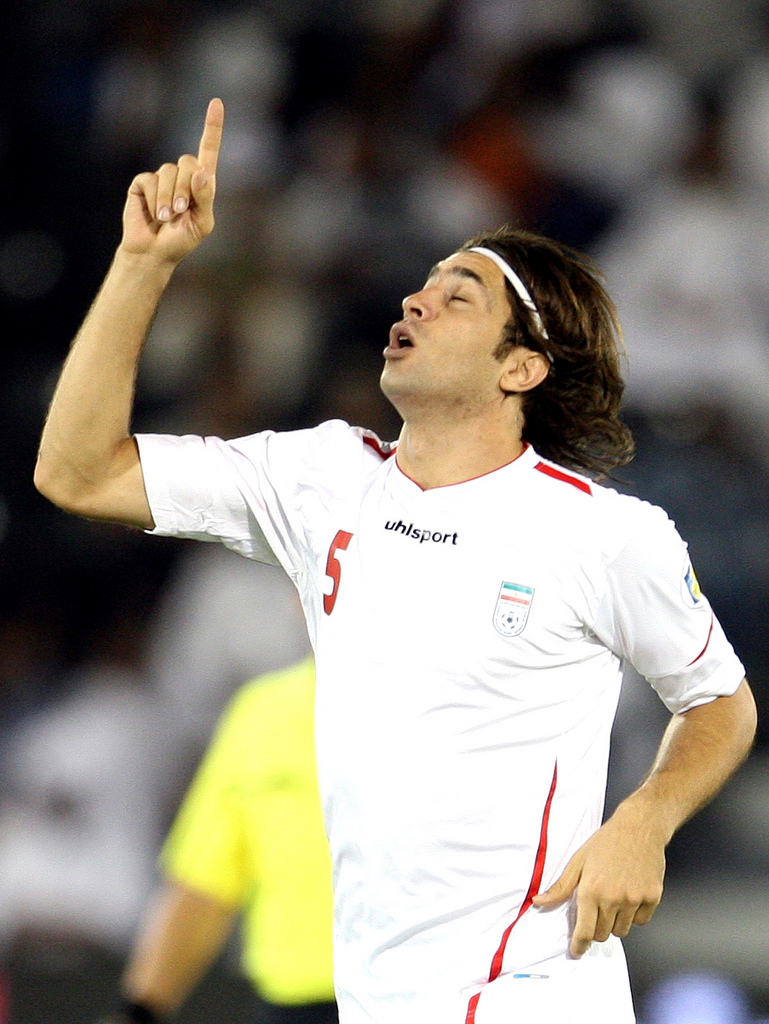
- Aghily after scoring for Iran in 2011

Personal information
- Full name: Hadi Anvar Aghily
- Date of birth: 15 January 1981 (age 45)
- Place of birth: Tehran, Iran
- Height: 1.85 m (6 ft 1 in)
- Position: Centre-back

Senior career*
Years	Team	Apps	(Gls)
2001–2004	Saipa	63	(2)
2004–2011	Sepahan	178	(15)
2011–2012	Al-Arabi	20	(0)
2012–2013	Qatar SC	16	(4)
2013–2016	Sepahan	76	(8)
Total		353	(29)

International career
2006–2012	Iran	69	(10)
- * Club domestic league appearances and goals

Hadi Anvar Aghily (Persian: هادی عقیلی; born 15 January 1981) is a former Iranian professional footballer who played as a centre-back. Known for his toughness, positioning and intelligent movement, he was nominated for the Asian Player of The Year award twice in 2009 and 2011.

Aghily began his career at Saipa, then moved to Sepahan and reached the 2007 AFC Champions League Final. He spent two successful seasons in Qatar with Al-Arabi and Qatar SC, before returning to Sepahan and concluding his football career in 2016.

He captained the Iranian national team on multiple occasions.

== Club career ==
=== Early years ===
Aghily was born in Tehran. He was part of the Persepolis youth academy, but left for Saipa in 2001.

=== Sepahan ===
After three years at Saipa, he moved to Sepahan where he won the Hazfi Cup and also played in the AFC Champions League final in 2007. He also played in the 2007 FIFA Club World Cup. After his good games, he was linked with a move to Japanese teams and also with a return to Persepolis, but he decided to extend his contract with Sepahan. He had so many injuries during the 2008–09 season that he did not play many matches for Sepahan and missed some of the matches of the 2010 FIFA World Cup qualification for Team Melli.

On 28 July 2009, Aghili traveled to Freiburg in order to negotiate a future move to the Bundesliga side. However, negotiations were cut short after a few days and the club released a statement saying that "Hadi was not the player that they were looking for." He won the league with Sepahan twice in a row. He left Sepahan in the summer of 2011 after seven seasons.

=== Qatar Stars League ===
In July 2011, Aghili signed a new contract with Al-Arabi. He wears the number 55 and was the club's captain. He won the Sheikh Jassem Cup while with the club. There were rumors that he would join Persepolis after the Iran Pro League season had finished, but he signed with Qatar SC on 22 June 2012, remaining in Qatar Stars League for another season. He played many matches for the team.

=== Return to Sepahan ===
On 19 June 2013, after spending two seasons in Qatar, he returned to his former club, Sepahan. He officially rejoined the club on 1 July 2013, signing a two-year contract. He made his debut in a 2–0 win over Foolad and scored his first goal in the next match from penalty kicks in a 2–1 away win against Esteghlal. He was also the captain of Sepahan for their match with Esteghlal, as Moharram Navidkia did not play because of injury. On 9 June 2014, Aghily extended his contract with Sepahan until 30 June 2017.

== International career ==
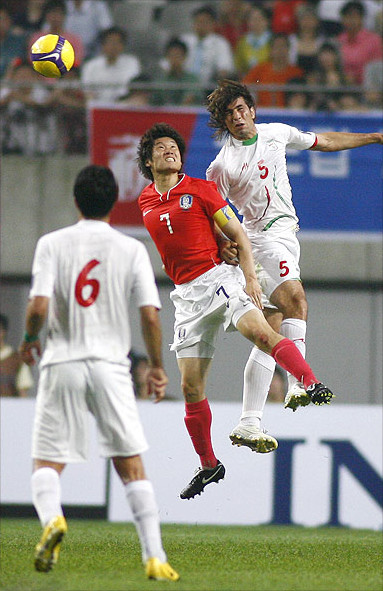
Aghily in a match against South Korea in the 2010 FIFA World Cup qualification phase

In October 2006, he was called up to the Iranian national team for the 2006 LG Cup held in Jordan. He made his debut for Iran on 4 October 2006 in a match against Iraq.

He was an important member of the Iranian squad at various major tournaments, such as the 2007 and 2011 AFC Asian Cups, the 2008 and 2010 WAFF Championships, as well as the 2010 and 2014 FIFA World Cup qualification phases.

=== Retirement ===
Prior to a 2014 World Cup qualifying match against Lebanon, Aghily left the team camp because he knew he would not be in the starting lineup. He was banned for one year and Carlos Queiroz left him out of the team. Before the last three World Cup qualifying matches in June 2013, he publicly apologised to Queiroz and Iranian fans but was still not called up. In July 2013, he revealed that the Iranian FA and Queiroz wanted him to sign an apology letter, but Mehdi Rahmati advised him not to as he believed that Iran would lose the first match and would then beg him to return.

== Career statistics ==
=== Club ===
Last updated on 10 December 2016.

Club performance			League		Cup		Continental		Total	
Season	Club	League	Apps	Goals	Apps	Goals	Apps	Goals	Apps	Goals
Iran			League		Hazfi Cup		Asia		Total	
2001–02	Saipa	Iran Pro League	21	1	0	0	—		21	1
2002–03	Saipa	Iran Pro League	22	1	0	0	—		22	1
2003–04	Saipa	Iran Pro League	20	0	0	0	—		20	0
2004–05	Sepahan	Iran Pro League	26	0	0	0	3	1	26	0
2005–06	Sepahan	Iran Pro League	27	0	0	0	—		27	0
2006–07	Sepahan	Iran Pro League	27	3	5	4	12	0	44	7
2007–08	Sepahan	Iran Pro League	28	2	2	1	5	2	35	5
2008–09	Sepahan	Iran Pro League	23	1	1	0	5	1	29	1
2009–10	Sepahan	Iran Pro League	22	5	2	0	6	0	30	5
2010–11	Sepahan	Iran Pro League	25	4	3	1	8	3	36	8
Qatar			League		Emir of Qatar Cup		Asia		Total	
2011–12	Al-Arabi	Qatar Stars League	20	0	0	0	5	0	25	0
2012–13	Qatar SC	Qatar Stars League	16	4	0	0	—		16	4
Iran			League		Hazfi Cup		Asia		Total	
2013–14	Sepahan	Iran Pro League	27	5	1	0	6	0	33	5
2014–15	Sepahan	Iran Pro League	15	0	0	0	0	0	15	0
2015–16	Sepahan	Iran Pro League	28	3	3	0	0	0	31	3
Total	Iran		311	29	18	6	43	7	372	42
Total	Qatar		36	4	0	0	5	0	41	4
Career total			319	25	18	6	49	7	386	38

Season	Team	Assists
05–06	Sepahan	1
07–08	Sepahan	1
0–09	Sepahan	1
10–11	Sepahan	1
11–12	Al-Arabi	7
12–13	Qatar SC	1
13–14	Sepahan	1
14–15	Sepahan	0

=== International goals ===
Scores and results list Iran's goal tally first.

#	Date	Venue	Opponent	Score	Result	Competition
1	26 May 2008	Azadi Stadium, Tehran	Zambia	3–2	3–2	Friendly
2	11 August 2008	Takhti Stadium, Tehran	Qatar	3–0	6–1	2008 WAFF
3	15 August 2008	Takhti Stadium, Tehran	Jordan	1–0	2–1	2008 WAFF
4	6 January 2010	Singapore National Stadium, Kallang	Singapore	1–0	3–1	2011 ACQ
5	11 August 2010	Hrazdan Stadium, Yerevan	Armenia	1–1	3–1	Friendly
6	11 August 2010	Hrazdan Stadium, Yerevan	Armenia	3–1	3–1	Friendly
7	24 September 2010	Amman International Stadium, Amman	Bahrain	1–0	3–0	2010 WAFF
8	24 September 2010	Amman International Stadium, Amman	Bahrain	2–0	3–0	2010 WAFF
9	6 September 2011	Jassim Bin Hamad Stadium, Doha	Qatar	1–0	1–1	2014 WCQ
10	11 October 2011	Azadi Stadium, Tehran	Bahrain	3–0	6–0	2014 WCQ

== Honours ==
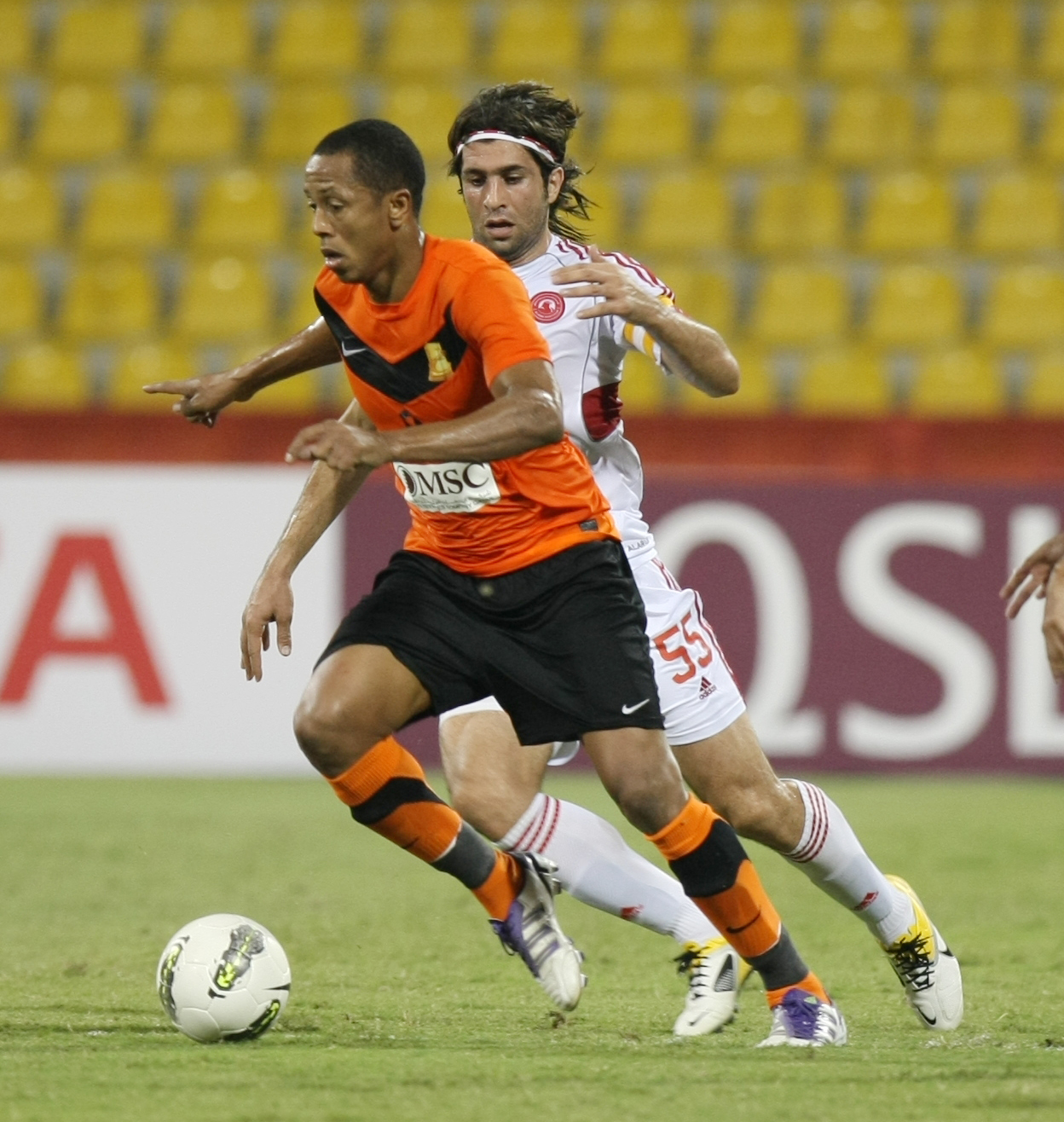
Hadi Aghily as Al-Arabi captain with Cabore

Sepahan

- Iran Pro League: 2009–10, 2010–11, 2014–15
- Hazfi Cup: 2005–06, 2006–07
- AFC Champions League Runner-up: 2007

Al-Arabi

- Sheikh Jassem Cup: 2011

Iran

- WAFF Championship: 2008

Individual

- Asian Footballer of the Year Fourth place: 2009
- Asian Footballer of the Year Runner-up: 2011
