= Reza Talabeh =

Iranian footballer

Personal information
- Full name: Seyyed Reza Talabeh Yazdi
- Date of birth: February 26, 1989 (age 37)
- Place of birth: Yazd, Iran
- Position: Defender

Team information
- Current team: Foolad Natanz

Youth career
- –2009: Sepahan

Senior career*
Years	Team	Apps	(Gls)
2007–2009	Sepahan	0	(0)
2009–2010	Sepahan Novin		
2010–2011	Foolad Natanz		
2011–	Malavan	0	(0)

International career^{‡}
2007–2008	Iran U20		
2010–	Iran U23	7	(0)
- * Club domestic league appearances and goals as of 1 August 2011 ‡ National team caps and goals as of 23 February 2011

Seyed Reza Talabeh Yazdi (Persian: رضا طلبه یزدی, born March 8, 1989, in Yazd) is an Iranian football defender who currently plays for Malavan F.C. in the Iran Pro League.

== Club Career Statistic ==
- Last Update: 1 August 2011

Club performance			League		Cup		Continental		Total	
Season	Club	League	Apps	Goals	Apps	Goals	Apps	Goals	Apps	Goals
Iran			League		Hazfi Cup		Asia		Total	
2011–12	Malavan	Pro League	0	0	0	0	-	-	0	0
Career total			3	0	0	0	0	0	3	0

- Assist Goals

Season	Team	Assists
11/12	Malavan	0
