= Hossein Kazemi =

Iranian footballer (born 1979)

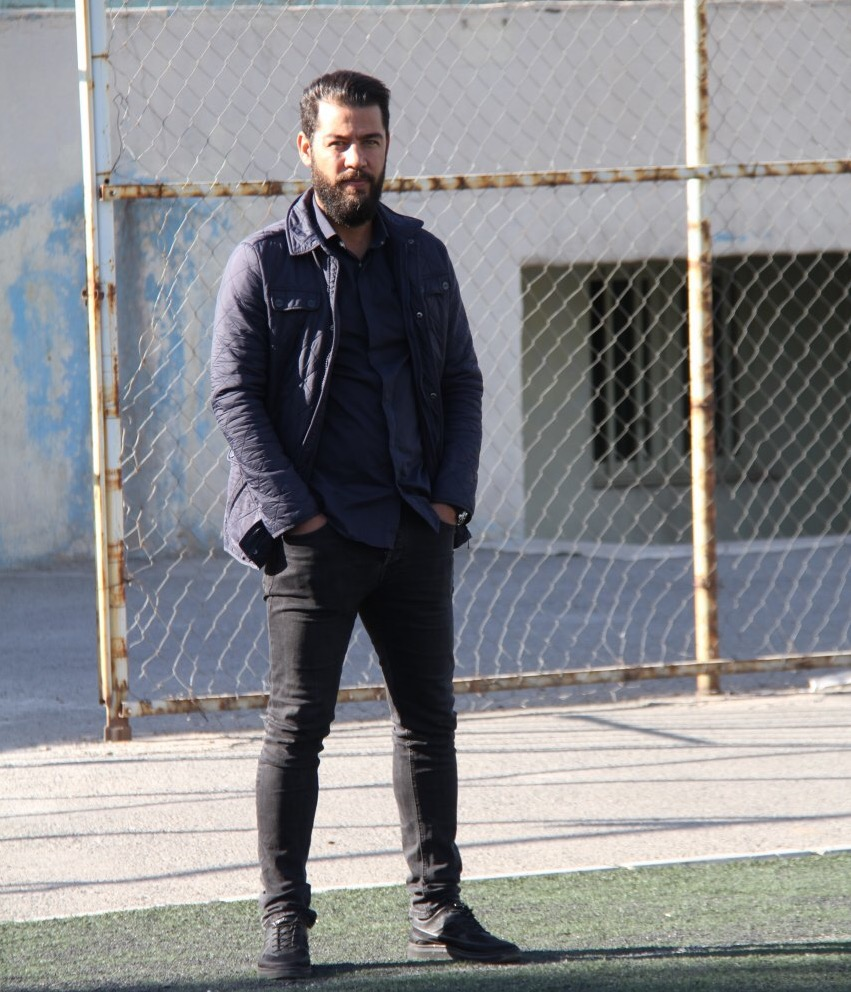

Personal information
- Full name: Hossein Kazemi
- Date of birth: October 3, 1979 (age 47)
- Place of birth: Tehran, Iran
- Height: 1.80 m (5 ft 11 in)
- Position: Defensive midfielder

Senior career*
Years	Team	Apps	(Gls)
2000–2004	Saipa	88	(6)
2004–2007	Esteghlal	74	(7)
2007–2008	Sepahan	29	(1)
2008–2010	Esteghlal	57	(10)
2010–2011	Steel Azin	33	(2)
2011–2012	Rah Ahan	31	(8)
2012	Mes Kerman	6	(0)
2012–2013	Fajr Sepasi	19	(1)
2013–2014	Aluminium	16	(1)
Total		353	(36)

International career^{‡}
2006–2009	Iran	12	(1)
- * Club domestic league appearances and goals as of 10 May 2013 ‡ National team caps and goals as of 31 August 2009

Hossein Kazemi (Persian: حسین كاظمی, born October 3, 1979, in Tehran, Iran) is retired Iranian football player who last played for Aluminium in Azadegan League. He has also featured in an episode of a TV series in Iran, with former Esteghlal team-mate, Ali Ansarian.

== Club career ==
After starting his career at his hometown club Saipa, he later moved to Pro League rivals Esteghlal He was an on-and-off player during the 2004–05 season, but became a pivotal part in the season and won a fixed spot in stacked midfield. He has scored a number of important goals for Esteghlal. After the 2006–07 season, he moved from Esteghlal to rivals Sepahan. He remained at Sepahan for the 2007–08 season before return to Esteghlal. With Sepahan, he reached the 2007 AFC Champions League final in which Sepahan was defeated.

His good performances have earned him a number of caps in Team Melli. During the management of Ali Daei as Team Melli head coach, he had become an important member of the national team. Though, under new Esteghlal coach, Samad Marfavi, he became a substitute player during the first weeks of the season. This led to him not being nominated for the crucial 2011 AFC Asian Cup Qualifiers against Jordan. After spending two seasons with Esteghlal, he joined Steel Azin, where he stayed for a season before joining Rah Ahan in 2011 where he joined Daei and stayed for a season. He joined Mes Kerman for 2012–13 season and moved to Fajr Sepasi halfway through the season as he did not get any playing time in Mes. He signed with Aluminium in summer 2013 for one season.

=== Club career statistics ===
As of 24 June 2015

Club performance			League		Cup		Continental		Total	
Season	Club	League	Apps	Goals	Apps	Goals	Apps	Goals	Apps	Goals
Iran			League		Hazfi Cup		Asia		Total	
2000–01	Saipa	Azadegan League	22	1			–	–		
2001–02	Saipa	Pro League	26	4			–	–		
2002–03	Saipa	Pro League	18	0			–	–		
2003–04	Saipa	Pro League	22	1			–	–		
2004–05	Esteghlal	Pro League	21	2			–	–		
2005–06	Esteghlal	Pro League	26	2	0	0	–	–	26	2
2006–07	Esteghlal	Pro League	27	3	0	0	–	–	27	3
2007–08	Sepahan	Pro League	29	1	2	0	11	0	42	1
2008–09	Esteghlal	Pro League	29	6	1	0	6	1	36	7
2009–10	Esteghlal	Pro League	28	4	1	0	6	1	35	5
2010–11	Steel Azin	Pro League	33	2	3	0	–	–	36	2
2011–12	Rah Ahan	Pro League	31	8	1	0	–	–	32	8
2012–13	Mes Kerman	Pro League	6	0	0	0	–	–	6	0
2012–13	Fajr Sepasi	Pro League	19	1	0	0	–	–	19	1
2013–14	Aluminium	Division 1	16	0	–	–	–	–	16	0
Career total			323	35			23	2		

- Assists

Season	Team	Assists
05–06	Esteghlal	2
06–07	Esteghlal	2
07–08	Sepahan	4
08–09	Esteghlal	1
10–11	Steel Azin	2
11–12	Rah Ahan	4
12–13	Mes Kerman	0
12–13	Fajr Sepasi	0

== International career ==
He was called up to join the Iranian national team for the first time in August 2006, and made his debut for Iran in a friendly match against the UAE national team. He has later been called up regularly for national team games. Under the spell of Ali Daei he played in 2008 West Asian Football Federation Championship, 2011 AFC Asian Cup qualification and 2010 FIFA World Cup qualification.

=== International goals ===
Scores and results list Iran's goal tally first.

#	Date	Venue	Opponent	Score	Result	Competition
1	14 March 2009	Azadi Stadium, Tehran	Kenya	1–0	1–0	Friendly

== Honours ==
=== Club ===
Esteghlal

- Iran Pro League (2): 2005–06, 2008–09

Sepahan

- AFC Champions League:
  - Runner-up (1): 2007
- Iran Pro League:
  - Runner-up (1): 2007–08

=== Country ===
- WAFF Championship (1): 2008
