= Amir Radi =

Iranian footballer

Personal information
- Full name: Amir Radi
- Date of birth: January 7, 1983 (age 43)
- Place of birth: Iran
- Height: 1.79 m (5 ft 10 in)
- Position: Midfielder

Senior career*
| Years | Team | Apps | (Gls) |
| 2007–2008 | Sepahan | 1 | (0) |
- * Club domestic league appearances and goals

Amir Radi (Persian: امیر رادی, born January 7, 1983) is an Iranian football midfielder.
