= Mehdi Seyed-Salehi =

Iranian former footballer and coach

Mehdi Seyedsalehi
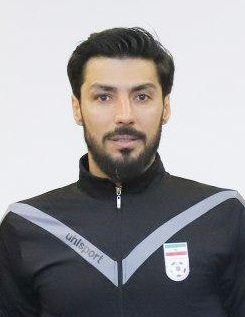
- Seyed-Salehi in December 2019

Personal information
- Full name: Seyedmohammadmahdi Seyedsalehi
- Date of birth: 27 July 1981 (age 45)
- Place of birth: Tehran, Iran
- Height: 1.90 m (6 ft 3 in)
- Position: Striker

Youth career
- 1993–1996: Bank Melli
- 1996–1997: Moghavemat Tehran

Senior career*
Years	Team	Apps	(Gls)
1997–1999	Bank Tejarat		
1999–2001	Rah Ahan		
2001–2008	Sepahan		
2008–2009	Paykan	29	(8)
2009–2011	Esteghlal	35	(12)
2011–2012	Sepahan	30	(8)
2012–2013	Tractor	32	(16)
2013–2014	Persepolis	22	(6)
2014	Saipa	10	(0)
2014–2015	Esteghlal Khuzestan	15	(7)
2015–2016	Gostaresh Foolad	8	(1)

International career^{‡}
2003	Iran U23		
2008–2010	Iran	12	(1)
- * Club domestic league appearances and goals as of 15 June 2016 ‡ National team caps and goals as of December 12, 2008

Seyedmohammadmahdi Seyedsalehi, (more commonly known as Mehdi Seyed Salehi, Persian: سیدمحمدمهدی سیدصالحی, born July 27, 1981, in Iran) is a former Iranian football player. He usually played as a striker.

== Club career ==
=== Persepolis ===
He signed a two-year contract with Tehran's reds until end of 2013–14 Season. He scored his first goal in his debut match against Tractor.

== International career ==
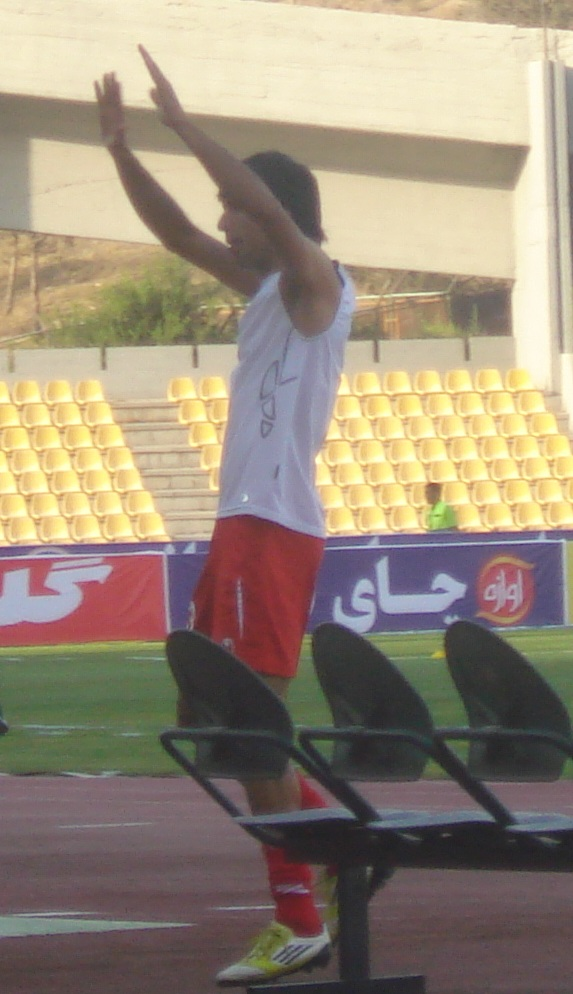
Seyed-Salehi in Persepolis' training, Takhti Stadium, 23 August 2013

He was a member of Iran national under-23 football team in its unsuccessful qualification campaign for Athens 2004.

He made his debut for Iran national football team in October 2008, coming in as a substitute against North Korea national football team. He scored his first goal in a friendly match against China in Oman from the penalty kick.

== Career statistics ==
=== Club ===
As of 16 October 2014.

Club	Division	Season	League		Hazfi Cup		Asia		Total	
Club	Division	Season	Apps	Goals	Apps	Goals	Apps	Goals	Apps	Goals
Sepahan	Pro League	2002–03	14	0			–	–		
Sepahan	Pro League	2003–04	15	2			6	3		
Sepahan	Pro League	2004–05	17	0			3	0		
Sepahan	Pro League	2005–06	19	3			–	–		
Sepahan	Pro League	2006–07	22	1	5	0	7	5	34	6
Sepahan	Pro League	2007–08	20	4	2	1	5	1	27	7
Paykan	Pro League	2008–09	29	8	1	0	–	–	30	8
Esteghlal	Pro League	2009–10	23	4	2	4	6	2	31	10
Esteghlal	Pro League	2010–11	12	8	1	0	6	1	19	9
Sepahan	Pro League	2011–12	30	8	0	0	6	1	36	9
Tractor	Pro League	2012–13	32	16	1	1	5	2	38	19
Persepolis	Pro League	2013–14	22	6	0	0	–	–	22	6
Saipa	Pro League	2014–15	10	0	1	3	–	–	11	3
Esteghlal Kh.	Pro League	2014–15	15	7	0	0	–	–	15	7
Gostaresh	Pro League	2015–16	8	1	0	0	–	–	8	1
Career total			280	68			44	15		

- Assist Goals

Season	Team	Assists
06–07	Sepahan	2
08–09	Paykan	3
09–10	Esteghlal	5
10–11	Esteghlal	1
11–12	Sepahan	2
12–13	Tractor	3
13–14	Persepolis	1
14–15	Saipa	1

Scores and results list Iran's goal tally first, score column indicates score after each Seyed-Salehi goal.

List of international goals scored by Mehdi Seyed-Salehi
No.	Date	Venue	Opponent	Score	Result	Competition
1	19 December 2008	Sultan Qaboos Sports Complex, Muscat, Oman	China	1–0	2–0	2008 Oman International Tournament

== Honours ==
=== Club ===
Sepahan

- AFC Champions League: 2007 (Runner-up)
- Iran Pro League: 2002–03, 2007–08 (Runner-up), 2011–12
- Hazfi Cup: 2003–04, 2005–06, 2006–07

Esteghlal

- Iran Pro League: 2010–11 (Runner-up)

Tractor

- Iran Pro League: 2012–13 (Runner-up)

Persepolis

- Iran Pro League: 2013–14 (Runner-up)
