= Abbas Mohammadi =

Iranian footballer

Personal information
- Full name: Abbas Shah Abadi Mohammadi
- Date of birth: 23 August 1975 (age 51)
- Place of birth: Kerman, Iran
- Height: 1.90 m (6 ft 3 in)
- Position: Goalkeeper

Senior career*
Years	Team	Apps	(Gls)
2000–2002	Mes Kerman		(0)
2002–2004	Bargh		(0)
2004–2007	Mes Kerman		(0)
2007–2009	Sepahan	31	(0)
2009–2010	Mes Kerman	22	(0)
2010–2012	Tractor Sazi	13	(0)
2012	Sanat Naft	8	(0)

International career^{‡}
2008	Iran	1	(0)
- * Club domestic league appearances and goals as of 1 January 2012 ‡ National team caps and goals as of 30 January 2008

Abbas Mohammadi (Persian: عباس محمدی, born August 23, 1975) is a retired Iranian football goalkeeper who mostly played at Iran's Premier Football League.

== Club career ==
Abbas Mohammadi played for Mes Kerman F.C. before moving to Sepahan F.C. in 2007. With Sepahan he was able to play in the AFC Champions League and his ability and effort was the reason Sepahan made it to Final match before losing to Urawa Red Diamonds. Mohammadi was also able to play in the 2007 FIFA Club World Cup with Sepahan and was again one of their top players.

=== Club career statistics ===
As of 13 June 2012

Club performance			League		Cup		Continental		Total	
Season	Club	League	Apps	Goals	Apps	Goals	Apps	Goals	Apps	Goals
Iran			League		Hazfi Cup		Asia		Total	
2006–07	Mes	Division 1	26	0		0	-	-		0
2007–08	Sepahan	Pro League	18	0		0	9	0		0
2008–09	Sepahan	Pro League	13	0		0	0	0		0
2009–10	Mes	Pro League	22	0		0	2	0		0
2010–11	Tractor Sazi	Pro League	3	0	2	0	-	-	5	0
2011–12	Tractor Sazi	Pro League	10	0	1	0	-	-	11	0
2011–12	Sanat Naft	Pro League	8	0	0	0	-	-	8	0
Total	Iran		95	0		0	11	0		0
Career total			95	0		0	11	0		0

== International career ==
He made his debut for Iran in a friendly match against Costa Rica on January 30, 2008.
