= Jalal Akbari =

Iranian footballer (born 1983)

Personal information
- Full name: Jalal Akbari Kelishadi
- Date of birth: 5 July 1983 (age 43)
- Place of birth: Falavarjan, Iran
- Height: 1.77 m (5 ft 9 1/2 in)
- Position: Left back

Youth career
- Polyacryl
- Sepahan

Senior career*
Years	Team	Apps	(Gls)
2004–2009	Sepahan	125	(11)
2009–2011	Persepolis	20	(0)
2012	PAS Hamedan	0	(0)

International career^{‡}
2006	Iran U23	6	(1)
2007	Iran	1	(0)
Medal record
Representing Iran
Asian Games
Bronze medal – third place	2006 Qatar	Team competition
- * Club domestic league appearances and goals as of 24 April 2011 ‡ National team caps and goals as of 6 August 2009

Jalal Akbari Kelishadi (Persian: جلال اكبری کلیشادی, born 5 July 1983) is an Iranian footballer who plays as a left back.

== Club career ==
Though he usually plays as a defender, in the IPL 2005/06 season, Akbari was one of the best goalscorers for Sepahan, scoring 6 goals in 26 appearances for the club. He always was a regular player during his time in Sepahan. He moved to Persepolis in summer 2009.

=== Club Career Statistics ===
Last Update 24 April 2011

Club performance			League		Cup		Continental		Total	
Season	Club	League	Apps	Goals	Apps	Goals	Apps	Goals	Apps	Goals
Iran			League		Hazfi Cup		Asia		Total	
2004–05	Sepahan	Persian Gulf Cup	28	0	1	0	5	0	34	0
2005–06	Sepahan	Persian Gulf Cup	26	6	4	0	-	-	30	6
2006–07	Sepahan	Persian Gulf Cup	23	3	4	1	10	0	37	4
2007–08	Sepahan	Persian Gulf Cup	25	1	2	0	5	0	32	1
2008–09	Sepahan	Persian Gulf Cup	23	1	2	0	1	0	25	1
2009–10	Persepolis	Persian Gulf Cup	15	0	4	0	-	-	19	0
2010–11	Persepolis	Persian Gulf Cup	5	0	0	0	0	0	5	0
Total	Iran		145	11	16	1	26	0	187	12
Career total			145	11	16	1	26	0	187	12

- Assist Goals

Season	Team	Assists
05-06	Sepahan	1
06-07	Sepahan	4
07-08	Sepahan	1
08-09	Sepahan	2
09-10	Persepolis	0
10-11	Persepolis	1

== International career ==
Jalal Akbari was a member of Iran national under-23 football team, participating in the 2006 Asian Games. In June 2007 he had his debut for the senior national team in a friendly against Mexico.

== Honours ==
=== Club ===
- Iran's Premier Football League:
  - Runner up: 1
    - 2007/08 with Sepahan
- Hazfi Cup
  - Winner: 4
    - 2005/06 with Sepahan
    - 2006/07 with Sepahan
    - 2009/10 with Persepolis
    - 2010/11 with Persepolis
- AFC Champions League
  - Runner up: 1
    - 2007 with Sepahan
