= Mohsen Hamidi =

Iranian footballer

Personal information
- Full name: Mohsen Hamidi
- Date of birth: September 30, 1985 (age 41)
- Place of birth: Ahvaz, Iran
- Height: 1.75 m (5 ft 9 in)
- Position: Winger

Senior career*
Years	Team	Apps	(Gls)
2003–2007	Foolad	51	(2)
2007–2008	Sepahan	14	(2)
2008–2009	Pas Hamedan	12	(0)
2009–2012	Shahin Bushehr	64	(1)
2012–2013	Aluminium Hormozgan	28	(0)
2013–2014	Sanat Naft	17	(2)
2014–2015	PAS Hamedan	20	(0)
2015–2016	Esteghlal Ahvaz	10	(0)
2016–2017	Gostaresh Foolad	13	(1)
2017	Aluminium Arak	?	(?)
2017	Sanat Naft	4	(0)

International career
2007	Iran U23	3	(0)
- * Club domestic league appearances and goals as of 12 March 2018

Mohsen Hamidi (Persian: محسن حمیدی, born September 30, 1985) is an Iranian football midfielder who most recently played for Sanat Naft in the Persian Gulf Pro League.

== Club career ==
=== Club career statistics ===
As of 21 January 2016

Club performance			League		Cup		Continental		Total	
Season	Club	League	Apps	Goals	Apps	Goals	Apps	Goals	Apps	Goals
Iran			League		Hazfi Cup		Asia		Total	
2003–04	Foolad	Pro League	1	0			-	-		
2004–05	Foolad	Pro League	11	1			-	-		
2005–06	Foolad	Pro League	20	1				0		
2006–07	Foolad	Pro League	20	0	2	1	-	-	22	1
2007–08	Sepahan	Pro League	14	2		0	4	0		2
2008–09	Pas	Pro League	12	0			-	-		
2009–10	Shahin	Pro League	24	0			-	-		
2010–11	Shahin	Pro League	24	0	1	0	-	-	25	0
2011–12	Shahin	Pro League	16	1	0	0	-	-	16	1
2012–13	Aluminium	Pro League	28	0	0	0	-	-	28	0
2013–14	Sanat Naft	Division 1	17	2	4	0	-	-	21	0
2014–15	PAS Hamedan	Division 1	20	0	3	0	-	-	23	0
2015–16	Esteghlal Ahvaz	Pro League	10	0	1	0	-	-	11	0
2015–16	Gostaresh	Pro League	0	0	0	0	-	-	0	0
Career total			217	7				0		

- Assist Goals

Season	Team	Assists
05–06	Foolad	1
10–11	Shahin	0
