= Mahmoud Karimi Sibaki =

Retired Iranian football striker

Mahmoud Karimi
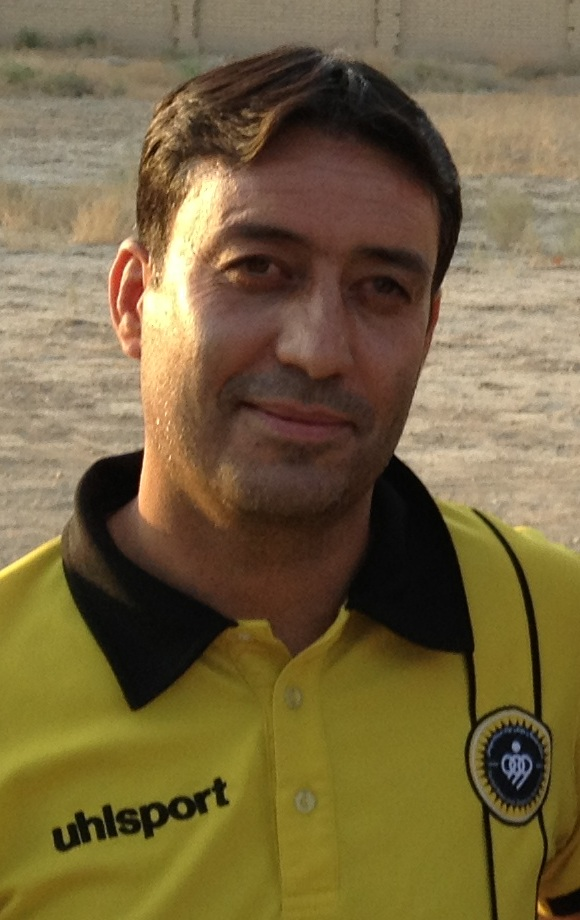
- Karimi with Sepahan in 2013

Personal information
- Full name: Mahmoud Karimi Sibaki
- Date of birth: May 9, 1978 (age 48)
- Place of birth: Isfahan, Iran
- Height: 1.68 m (5 ft 6 in)
- Position: Striker

Youth career
- 1995–1999: Sepahan

Senior career*
Years	Team	Apps	(Gls)
1998–2009	Sepahan	348	(33)

International career
2003–2007	Iran		

Managerial career
- 2010–2014: Sepahan (assistant)
- 2016–2018: Sepahan (assistant)
- 2020–: Sepahan (assistant)
- * Club domestic league appearances and goals

Mahmoud Karimi (Persian: محمود کریمی, born May 9, 1978) is a retired Iranian football striker who played for Sepahan in Iran Pro League and currently is Sepahan's assistant manager.

Karimi's full name is Mahmoud Karimi Sibaki, and he is from Sibak, a Georgian town in Fereydunshahr county. He is the most famous Iranian Georgian footballer in Iran. His most memorable performance dates to the semifinals of the 2007 Hazfi Cup, when he scored a hat-trick in the second overtime period against Persepolis F.C. to give Sepahan a 4-1 win.

On July 17, 2009 Karimi announced his retirement from playing club football due to nagging injuries.

== Club career statistics ==
Club performance			League		Cup		Continental		Total	
Season	Club	League	Apps	Goals	Apps	Goals	Apps	Goals	Apps	Goals
Iran			League		Hazfi Cup		Asia		Total	
1999–00	Sepahan	Azadegan League	?	1			-	-		
2000–01	Sepahan	Azadegan League	?	1			-	-		
2001–02	Sepahan	Persian Gulf Cup	?	5			-	-		
2002–03	Sepahan	Persian Gulf Cup	23	6			-	-		
2003–04	Sepahan	Persian Gulf Cup	23	5			6	6		
2004–05	Sepahan	Persian Gulf Cup	22	3			6	2		
2005–06	Sepahan	Persian Gulf Cup	23	0			-	-		
2006–07	Sepahan	Persian Gulf Cup	16	3	5	4	6	3	27	10
2007–08	Sepahan	Persian Gulf Cup	19	9	0	0	1	0	22^{1}	11^{1}
2008–09	Sepahan	Persian Gulf Cup	2	0	0	0	1	0	3	0
Career total				33			20	11		

^{1} includes 2 matches and 1 goal in FIFA Club World Cup 2007.

== Honours ==
Sepahan

- Iran Pro League

Winners (1): 2002–03
Runner Up (1): 2007–08

- Hazfi Cup

Winners (3): 2003–04, 2005–06, 2006–07

- Asian Champions League

Runner Up (1): 2007
