= Hossein Papi =

Iranian footballer (born 1985)

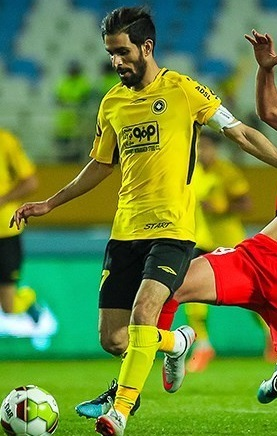

Personal information
- Full name: Hossein Papi
- Date of birth: February 27, 1985 (age 41)
- Place of birth: Azna, Iran
- Height: 1.70 m (5 ft 7 in)
- Positions: Winger; attacking midfielder

Youth career
- 2000–2004: Sepahan

Senior career*
Years	Team	Apps	(Gls)
2004–2019	Sepahan	209	(4)
2005–2006	→ Sepahan-B (loan)	17	(2)

International career
2004	Iran U20		
2007	Iran U23	1	(0)
- * Club domestic league appearances and goals as of 16 May 2015

Hossein Papi (Persian: حسین پاپی, born February 27, 1985) is a retired Iranian football player who played for Sepahan in the Iran Pro League.

== Club career ==
As product of Sepahan youth teams, Papi's talent was first discovered by Farhad Kazemi in 2004, and Luka Bonačić made him a starter in 2007, calling him "a prospect", but Papi's poor performance was hardly criticized by Bonačić in 2011. He is the captain of Sepahan F.C.

=== Club career statistics ===
As of 16 May 2015

Club performance			League		Cup		Continental		Total	
Season	Club	League	Apps	Goals	Apps	Goals	Apps	Goals	Apps	Goals
Iran			League		Hazfi Cup		Asia		Total	
2004–05	Sepahan	Pro League	3	0					3	0
2005–06	Sepahan Novin	Division 2					—			
2006–07	Sepahan	Pro League	6	0		1			6	0
2007–08	Sepahan	Pro League	19	1	0	0	7	1	26	1
2008–09	Sepahan	Pro League	28	0	0	0	1	1	29	1
2009–10	Sepahan	Pro League	26	0	0	0	6	0	32	0
2010–11	Sepahan	Pro League	8	0	2	0	2	0	12	0
2011–12	Sepahan	Pro League	4	0	1	0	0	0	5	0
2012–13	Sepahan	Pro League	22	0	5	0	6	0	33	0
2013–14	Sepahan	Pro League	30	0	1	0	6	0	37	0
2014–15	Sepahan	Pro League	28	1	0	0	0	0	28	1
2015–16	Sepahan	Pro League	0	0	0	0	0	0	0	0
2016–17	Sepahan	Pro League	23	2	0	0	0	0	23	2
2017–18	Sepahan	Pro League	12	0	1	0	0	0	13	0
2018–19	Sepahan	Pro League	4	0	0	0	-	-	4	0
Career total			210	4	10	1	28	2	248	7

- Assist Goals

Season	Team	Assists
07–08	Sepahan	2
08–09	Sepahan	1
09–10	Sepahan	1
10–11	Sepahan	0
11–12	Sepahan	2
12–13	Sepahan	7
13–14	Sepahan	5
14–15	Sepahan	2
15–16	Sepahan	?
16–17	Sepahan	?
17–18	Sepahan	2

== International career ==
Papi was invited to Iran national under-20 football team in December 2004.

== Honours ==
=== Club ===
Sepahan

- Iran Pro League (4): 2009–10, 2010–11, 2011–12, 2014–15
- Iran Pro League Runner up: 2007–08
- Hazfi Cup (2): 2006–07, 2012–13
- AFC Champions League Runner-up: 2007
