= Hadi Jafari =

Iranian footballer

Personal information
- Full name: Hadi Jafari
- Date of birth: August 4, 1982 (age 44)
- Place of birth: Falavarjan, Iran
- Height: 1.78 m (5 ft 10 in)
- Position: Midfielder

Team information
- Current team: Sepahan

Senior career*
Years	Team	Apps	(Gls)
2005–2013	Sepahan	85	(1)
2010–2011	→ Fo. Natanz (loan)	15	(5)
2012–2013	→ Gostaresh Foolad (loan)	30	(1)
- * Club domestic league appearances and goals as of 24 August 2011

Hadi Jafari (Persian: هادی جعفری; born 4 August 1982) is a retired Iranian football midfielder who currently plays for Sepahan F.C. in the Iran Pro League.

== Club career ==
=== Club career statistics ===
As of 24 August 2011

Club performance			League		Cup		Continental		Total	
Season	Club	League	Apps	Goals	Apps	Goals	Apps	Goals	Apps	Goals
Iran			League		Hazfi Cup		Asia		Total	
2005–06	Sepahan	Persian Gulf Cup	16	0			-	-		
2006–07	Sepahan	Persian Gulf Cup	24	0				0		
2007–08	Sepahan	Persian Gulf Cup	20	0		0	3	0		0
2008–09	Sepahan	Persian Gulf Cup	21	0		0	4	0		0
2009–10	Sepahan	Persian Gulf Cup	3	0		0	0	0		0
2010–11	Foolad Natanz	Azadegan League	15	5	0	0	-	-	15	5
2011–12	Gostaresh Foolad	Azadegan League	20	1	0	0	0	0		0
Total	Iran		119	1				0		
Career total			119	1				0		

- Assist Goals

Season	Team	Assists
05–06	Sepahan	1
06–07	Sepahan	2
07–08	Sepahan	2
08–09	Sepahan	1
09–10	Sepahan	0

== Honours ==
=== Club ===
- Iran's Premier Football League
  - Winner: 1
    - 2009/10 with Sepahan
