= Abdul-Wahab Abu Al-Hail =

Iraqi football player and manager

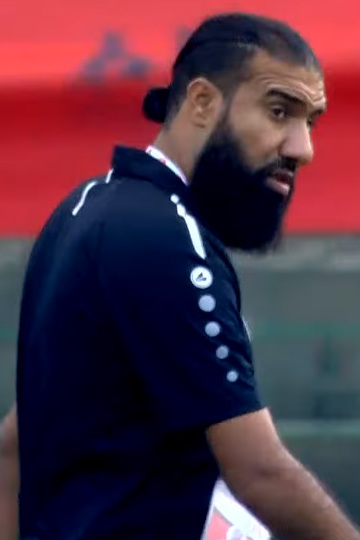
- Abu Al-Hail with Akhaa Ahli Aley in 2019

Personal information
- Full name: Abdul-Wahab Abu Al-Hail Labid Al-Zirjawi
- Date of birth: 21 December 1975 (age 50)
- Place of birth: Baghdad, Iraq
- Height: 1.80 m (5 ft 11 in)
- Position: Central midfielder

Team information
- Current team: Naft Al-Basra SC (Manager)

Youth career
- 1987–1992: Al-Rasheed

Senior career*
Years	Team	Apps	(Gls)
1993–1999	Al-Talaba	35	(7)
1999–2001	Al-Akhaa Al-Ahli		
2001–2003	Al-Shaab		
2003	Al-Akhaa Al-Ahli		
2003–2006	Esteghlal Ahvaz	69	(3)
2006–2009	Sepahan	88	(9)
2009–2010	Foolad	7	(0)
2010–2013	Al-Talaba		

International career
2004	Iraq Olympic (O.P.)	?	(?)
1997–2009	Iraq	59	(8)

Managerial career
- 2013–2015: Al-Talaba
- 2016–2020: Al-Akhaa Al-Ahli
- 2020–2021: Ansar
- 2021–2022: Zakho
- 2022–: Naft Al-Basra SC
- 2025–: Iraq Women
- * Club domestic league appearances and goals

Abdul-Wahab Abu Al-Hail Labid Al-Zirjawi (Arabic: عبد الوهاب أبو الهيل لابد الزيرجاوي; born 21 December 1975) is an Iraqi professional football manager and former player who is the head coach of the Iraq women's national football team.

== Club career ==
Abu Al-Hail started his career by playing for Al-Talaba in Iraq. He has also played for Al-Shaab of the UAE. In 2003, he moved to the Iranian Pro League club Esteghlal Ahvaz. After three seasons he joined the Esfahani club Sepahan. And stayed there for another 3 season where he won the Hazfi Cup once during his time and played many matches in AFC Champions League and 2007 FIFA Club World Cup. He moved to Foolad for 2009–10 season but he was rejected by the new coach Majid Jalali.

Abu Al-Hail started his career with Al Talaba in 1992. He left the club in 1999, moving to Al-Akhaa Al-Ahli of Lebanon, and then to Al-Shaab of the United Arab Emirates. In 2003, he moved to Iran, playing for Esteghlal Ahvaz, Sepahan and Foolad. While at Esteghlal, Abu Al-Hail was given the captain's armband: it was the first time in the history of the Iranian league that a foreign player had become captain.

== International career ==
Abdul-Wahab Abou Al-Hail was a key member of the Iraqi national team and one of the most coveted in Iraqi football. A jewel in the midfield, equipped with remarkable ball control, accurate passing, shooting and is particularly threatening at free-kicks. His coach Milan Zivadinovic once described him as 'Our Ronaldo', due to his importance to the side and his short 'Ronaldoesque' hair cut. He came onto the international scene during the Nehru Cup in 1997, missing a penalty in the shoot-out win over India.

At international level, Abu Al-Hail featured prominently in Iraq's qualifying campaign for the 2002 FIFA World Cup under then coach Rudolf Belin. Olympic manager Adnan Hamad called the midfielder into his squad for the 2004 Summer Olympics.

Abu Al-Hail was a member of the Iraq national football team. and was part of Iraq Olympic team in the 2004 Olympic Games, reached the 4th place. Abu Al-Hail was not selected in Iraq's title-winning 2007 AFC Asian Cup squad as the national authorities stayed faithful to players from the former youth team that had won the AFC Youth Championship 2000.

== Managerial career ==
Abu Al-Hail started his managerial career at Al-Talaba in 2013, remaining in charge until 2015. In December 2016, Abu Al-Hail became the head coach of his former club Akhaa Ahli Aley, in the Lebanese Premier League, for the 2016–17 season. In his second season as head coach, he finished fourth in the league. On 21 January 2020, he was appointed head coach of Ansar. He resigned on 20 March 2020, following Ansar's 2–2 draw to Safa.

On 21 April 2021, Abu Al-Hail was appointed head coach of Zakho in Iraq.

In May 2025, Abu Al-Hail was appointed as the head coach of the Iraqi women's national team

== Career statistics ==
=== Club ===
Appearances and goals by club, season and competition
Club	Season	League			National Cup (Note: Includes Hazfi Cup)		Continental		Total	
Club	Season	Division	Apps	Goals	Apps	Goals	Apps	Goals	Apps	Goals
Esteghlal Ahvaz	2003–04	Persian Gulf Cup	24	2			—	—		
Esteghlal Ahvaz	2004–05	Persian Gulf Cup	23	0			—	—		
Esteghlal Ahvaz	2005–06	Persian Gulf Cup	25	1			—	—		
Esteghlal Ahvaz	Total		72	3			0	0		
Sepahan	2006–07	Persian Gulf Cup	29	4			12	1		
Sepahan	2007–08	Persian Gulf Cup	31	5		0	5	0		5
Sepahan	2008–09	Persian Gulf Cup	28	0		0	5	0		0
Sepahan	Total									
Foolad	2009–10	Persian Gulf Cup	7	0	0	0	—	—	7	0
Career total			167	12			22	1		

=== International ===
Scores and results list Iraq's goal tally first.

List of international goals scored by Abdul-Wahab Abu Al-Hail
No.	Date	Venue	Opponent	Score	Result	Competition
1	27 August 1999	Al Hassan Stadium, Amman, Jordan	Lebanon	4–0	4–0	1999 Pan Arab Games
2	14 April 2001	Al-Shaab Stadium, Baghdad, Iraq	Nepal	1–0	9–1	2002 World Cup qualification
3	14 April 2001	Al-Shaab Stadium, Baghdad, Iraq	Nepal	3–0	9–1	2002 World Cup qualification
4	16 April 2001	Al-Shaab Stadium, Baghdad, Iraq	Kazakhstan	1–1	1–1	2002 World Cup qualification
5	21 April 2001	Almaty Central Stadium, Almaty, Kazakhstan	Macau	1–0	5–0	2002 World Cup qualification
6	21 April 2001	Almaty Central Stadium, Almaty, Kazakhstan	Macau	2–0	5–0	2002 World Cup qualification
7	23 April 2001	Almaty Central Stadium, Almaty, Kazakhstan	Nepal	2–0	4–2	2002 World Cup qualification
8	5 October 2001	Amman International Stadium, Amman, Jordan	Saudi Arabia	1–1	2–1	2002 World Cup qualification

=== Managerial ===
As of 10 July 2022

Team	Nat	From	To	Record				
Team	Nat	From	To	G	W	D	L	Win %
Al-Talaba	(Iraq)	12 September 2013	1 March 2015	33	12	8	13	36.36
Al-Akhaa Al-Ahli	(Lebanon)	20 December 2016	20 January 2020	76	33	18	25	43.42
Al Ansar FC	(Lebanon)	20 January 2020	20 March 2021	19	14	1	4	73.68
Zakho FC	(Iraq)	21 April 2021	22 April 2022	42	9	20	13	21.43
Naft Al-Basra SC	(Iraq)	10 July 2022	""Present""	0	0	0	0	—
Total				170	68	47	55	40.00

== Honours ==
=== Player ===
Sepahan

- Iranian Hazfi Cup: 2005–06

Iraq

- WAFF Championship: 2002
