= Saeid Bayat =

Iranian football Midfielder

Personal information
- Full name: Saeid Bayat Motlagh
- Date of birth: 17 March 1986 (age 40)
- Place of birth: Zanjan, Iran
- Position: Midfielder

Team information
- Current team: Shahin Bushehr F.C.
- Number: 31

Youth career
- Esteghlal

Senior career*
Years	Team	Apps	(Gls)
2007–2008	Esteghlal	12	(1)
2009–2010	Pas Hamedan	5	(0)
2010–2011	Gostaresh Foolad	19	(0)
2011–2012	Shahin Bushehr	23	(0)
2012	Sang Ahan Bafq		
2012–2013	Saba		
- * Club domestic league appearances and goals as of 17 December 2011 ‡ National team caps and goals as of 30 December 2009

Saeid Bayat (Persian: سعید بیات, 26 March 1986) is an Iranian football midfielder who plays for Shahin Bushehr in the Azadegan League.

== Club career ==
He played with Esteghlal in 2007–08 season.

He played for Sepahan between 2002 and 2008, which became IPL Champions in the 2002/03 season. He was also member of Sepahan at 2007 FIFA Club World Cup.

=== Club career statistics ===
As of 17 December 2011

Club performance			League		Cup		Continental		Total	
Season	Club	League	Apps	Goals	Apps	Goals	Apps	Goals	Apps	Goals
Iran			League		Hazfi Cup		Asia		Total	
2007–08	Esteghlal	Persian Gulf Cup	12	1			-	-		
2009–10	Pas	Persian Gulf Cup	5	0			-	-		
2010–11	Gostaresh	Division 1	19	0			-	-		
2011–12	Shahin	Pro League	1	0	0	0	-	-	1	0
Total	Iran		12	1			-	-		
Total	Career total						-	-		

- Assist Goals

Season	Team	Assists
2007–08	Esteghlal	0
09–10	Pas Hamedan	0
11–12	Shahin Bushehr	1

== Honours ==
=== Club ===
- Hazfi Cup
  - Runner up:1
    - 2011–12 with Shahin Bushehr
