= Farshad Bahadorani =

Iranian football midfielder (born 1982)

Personal information
- Full name: Farshad Bahadorani
- Date of birth: August 28, 1982 (age 44)
- Place of birth: Isfahan, Iran
- Height: 1.84 m (6 ft 0 in)
- Position: Midfielder

Senior career*
Years	Team	Apps	(Gls)
2003–2006	Zob Ahan		(3)
2006–2009	Sepahan	62	(1)
2009–2010	Aboomoslem	30	(0)
2010–2011	Moghavemat Sepasi	12	(1)
2011–2012	Gostaresh Foolad	25	(0)
2012–2014	Zob Ahan	20	(1)
- * Club domestic league appearances and goals as of 24 August 2012

Farshad Bahadorani (Persian: فرشاد بهادرانی, born August 28, 1982) is an Iranian football midfielder who currently plays for Zob Ahan in the Iran Pro League.

== Club career ==
=== Club career statistics ===
Last Update 24 August 2012

Club performance			League		Cup		Continental		Total	
Season	Club	League	Apps	Goals	Apps	Goals	Apps	Goals	Apps	Goals
Iran			League		Hazfi Cup		Asia		Total	
2003–04	Zob Ahan	Pro League		1			-	-		
2004–05	Zob Ahan	Pro League		1			-	-		
2005–06	Zob Ahan	Pro League	23	1			-	-		
2006–07	Sepahan	Pro League	23	0				0		
2007–08	Sepahan	Pro League	23	0			5	0		
2008–09	Sepahan	Pro League	16	1			3	0		
2009–10	Aboomoslem	Pro League	30	0			-	-		
2010–11	Moghavemat Sepasi	Division 1	12	1			-	-		
2011–12	Gostaresh Foolad	Division 1	25	3			-	-		
2012–13	Zob Ahan	Pro League	3	0	0	0	-	-	3	0
Career total				8				0		

- Assist Goals

Season	Team	Assists
05–06	Zob Ahan	1
06–07	Sepahan	1
07–08	Sepahan	2
08–09	Sepahan	1
09–10	Aboomoslem	0
