= Ebrahim Loveinian =

Iranian footballer

Personal information
- Full name: Ebrahim Loveinian
- Date of birth: September 10, 1978 (age 48)
- Place of birth: Ahvaz, Iran
- Height: 1.74 m (5 ft 8 1/2 in)
- Position: Midfielder

Senior career*
Years	Team	Apps	(Gls)
2006–2009	Sepahan	51	(0)
2009–2010	Aboumoslem	23	(0)
2010–2011	Damash Gilan	13	(0)
2011–2012	Nassaji		
2013–2014	Persisam Putra Samarinda	36	(0)
- * Club domestic league appearances and goals as of Oct 31, 2010

Ebrahim Loveinian (Persian: ابراهیم لوینیان, born 10 September 1978) is an Iranian former footballer who plays as a midfielder.

== Club career ==
Played with Sepahan for three seasons and then joined Aboumoslem for one season.

=== Club career statistics ===
As of 11 March 2011

Club performance			League		Cup		Continental		Total	
Season	Club	League	Apps	Goals	Apps	Goals	Apps	Goals	Apps	Goals
Iran			League		Hazfi Cup		Asia		Total	
2006–07	Sepahan	Pro League	22	0				0		
2007–08	Sepahan	Pro League	19	0		1	4	0		1
2008–09	Sepahan	Pro League	10	0		0	1	0		0
2009–10	Aboumoslem	Pro League	23	0	1	0	–	–	24	0
2010–11	Damash Gilan	Division 1	13	0	2	0	–	–	15	0
Total	Iran		87	0				0		
Career total			87	0				0		

- Assist Goals

Season	Team	Assists
06–07	Sepahan	4
07–08	Sepahan	1
09–10	Aboumoslem	0

== Honours ==
- Iran's Premier Football League
  - Runner up: 1
    - 2007/08 with Sepahan
- Iranian Cup
  - Winner: 1
    - 2006/07 with Sepahan
- AFC Champions League
  - Runner Up: 1
    - 2007 with Sepahan
