= List of Esteghlal F.C. seasons =

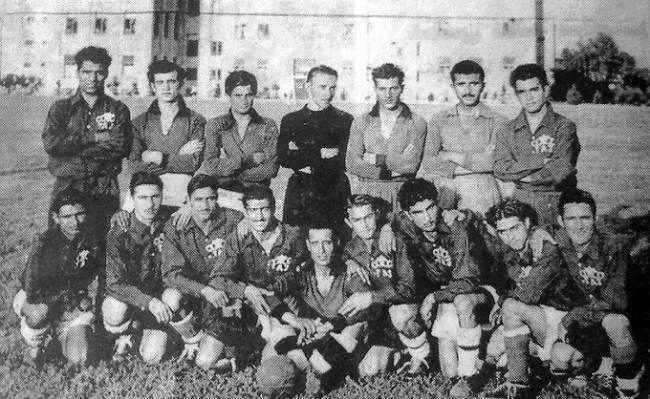
Taj F.C. players in 1950

Esteghlal F.C. is an Iranian professional association football club base in Tehran. The club was formed in Ferdowsi Street, central Tehran on 26 September 1945 as Docharkhesavaran and was renamed to Taj F.C. on 11 February 1950. In spring of 1979 and only a few weeks after the Iranian revolution the club was renamed to its current name, Esteghlal F.C.

== Key ==
=== Key to competitions ===
- ICT = Iran championship Tournament
- ILL = Iran Local League
- ILLQ = Iran Local League Qualification
- TJC = Takht Jamshid Cup
- TFL = Tehran Football League
- TFLQ = Tehran Football League Qualification
- TSL = Tehran Super League
- QL = Qods League
- Div 3 = Iran Football's 3rd Division
- Div 1 = Azadegan League
- IPL = Iran Pro League
- ISC = Iran Super Cup
- ACCT = Asian Champion Club Tournament
- ACC = Asian Club Championship
- ACWC = Asian Cup Winners' Cup
- ACL = AFC Champions League
- HC = Hazfi Cup
- THC = Tehran Hazfi Cup

=== Key to league record ===
- Div = Division
- P = Played
- W = Games won
- D = Games drawn
- L = Games lost
- F = Goals for
- A = Goals against
- Pts = Points
- Pos = Final position
- Q = Qualified to the final round of league
- Ab = Abandoned

=== Key to cup record ===
- DNP = Did not participate
- NH = Not held
- DNE = The club did not enter cup play
- QR1 = First qualification round
- QR2 = Second qualification round, etc.
- Group = Group stage
- GS2 = Second group stage
- R1 = First round
- R2 = Second round, etc.
- R16 = Round of 16
- QF = Quarter-finals
- SF = Semi-finals
- RU = Runners-up
- W = Winners

=== Key to colours ===
1st or W	Winners
2nd or RU	Runners-up
♦	Advanced to next round but the cup continued in next season
Promoted ↑	Promoted to upper tier
Relegated ↓	Relegated to lower tier
Top scorer in League	Top scorer in division

== Seasons ==
Results of league and cup competitions by season
Season	League									HC THC*	ISC	Asian		Season Top goalscorer	
Season	Div	P	W	D	L	F	A	Pts	Pos	HC THC*	ISC	Asian		Name	Goals
Season	Div	P	W	D	L	F	A	Pts	Pos	HC THC*	ISC	Competition	Result	Name	Goals
1946–47	TFL	9	6	1	2	?	?	13	2nd	RU*	NH	NH			
1947–48	TFL	5	2	0	3	7	8	4	3rd	W*	NH	NH			
1948–49	TFL	Did not attend								DNP*	NH	NH		–	–
1949–50	TFL	8	8	0	0	18	4	16	1st	SF*	NH	NH			
1950–51	TFL	NH								R2*	NH	NH		–	–
1951–52	TFL	8	5	1	2	32	5	11	2nd	W*	NH	NH			
1952–53	TFL	4	3	1	0	8	2	7	1st	NH*	NH	NH			
1953–54	TFL	7	4	1	2	?	?	13	4th	SF*	NH	NH			
1954–55	TFL	7	4	1	2	23	12	13	4th	NH*	NH	NH			
1955–56	TFL	NH								R1*	NH	NH			
1956–57	TFL	11	8	2	1	44	15	18	1st	DNP*	NH	NH		B. Jeddikar	8
1957–58	TFL	14	11	2	1	50	6	35	1st	RU*	NH	NH		N. Afshar	8
1957–58	ICC	6	5	1	0	33	4	11	1st	RU*	NH	NH		N. Afshar	8
1958–59	TFL	NH								NH*	NH	NH		–	–
1959–60	TFL	8	7	0	1	8	3	14	1st	W*	NH	NH			
1960–61	TFL	14	12	1	1	39	8	27	1st	NH*	NH	NH		P. Koozehkanani	9
1961–62	TFL	8	5	0	3	?	?	15	3rd	DNP*	NH	NH		B. Jeddikar	7
1962–63	TFL	11	9	2	0	26	4	20	1st	DNP*	NH	NH			
1963–64	TFL	NH								DNP*	NH	NH		–	–
1964–65	~~TFL~~	~~6~~	~~4~~	~~2~~	~~0~~	~~8~~	~~1~~	~~10~~	~~Ab~~	NH*	NH	NH		H. A'alam	2
1965–66	TFL	12	6	3	3	24	13	15	6th	NH*	NH	NH		M. Shoraka; G. Haratonian	5
1966–67	TFL	11	6	1	4	21	8	13	5th	NH*	NH	NH		A. Jabbari	8
1967–68	TFL	12	6	2	4	14	11	14	4th	NH*	NH	DNE		A. Jabbari	6
1968–69	TFLQ	4	4	0	0	9	0	8	Q	Group*	NH	NH		A. Jabbari	14
1968–69	TFL	15	9	5	1	33	4	23	1st	Group*	NH	NH		A. Jabbari	14
1969–70	TFL	15	9	5	1	33	4	23	2nd	NH*	NH	ACCT	W	A. Jabbari	13
1970–71	ILLQ	3	3	0	0	5	1	6	Q	RU*	NH	ACCT	3rd	A. Jabbari	6
1970–71	ILL	5	3	2	0	12	3	10	1st	RU*	NH	ACCT	3rd	A. Jabbari	6
1970–71	TFL	14	10	4	0	?	?	24	1st	RU*	NH	ACCT	3rd	A. Jabbari	6
1971–72	ILLQ	4	4	0	0	11	1	8	Q	NH*	NH	DNE		A. Jabbari	10
1971–72	~~TFL~~	~~1~~	~~1~~	~~0~~	~~0~~	~~1~~	~~0~~	~~2~~	~~Ab~~	NH*	NH	DNE		A. Jabbari	10
1971–72	ILL	14	9	0	5	29	13	18	3rd	NH*	NH	DNE		A. Jabbari	10
1972–73	TFL	15	12	3	0	28	5	27	1st	NH*	NH	NH		H. Ebrahimi	11
1973	TJC	22	14	7	1	44	15	35	2nd	NH*	NH	NH		Gh. Mazloumi	15
1974	TJC	22	15	3	4	30	14	33	1st	NH*	NH	NH		Gh. Mazloumi	10
1975	TJC	30	12	12	6	33	21	36	4th	NH*	NH	NH		Gh. Mazloumi	8
1976	TJC	30	11	13	6	28	19	35	4th	R16	NH	NH		H. Naraghi	7
1977	TJC	30	14	7	9	32	22	35	4th	R16 ♦	NH	NH		H. Rowshan; H. Naraghi	9
1978	~~TJC~~ (Note: Left unfinished due to Iranian revolution.)	~~12~~	~~7~~	~~3~~	~~2~~	~~12~~	~~7~~	~~17~~	~~Ab~~	W	NH	NH		P. Mazloumi	9
1979–80	Espandi Cup								10th	NH	NH	NH		–	–
1980–81	~~QTFL~~	~~7~~	~~6~~	~~1~~	~~0~~	~~27~~	~~1~~	~~13~~	~~Q~~	R1*	NH	NH		P. Mazloumi; A. Changiz	5
1980–81	TFL	NH due to start of Iran–Iraq War								R1*	NH	NH		P. Mazloumi; A. Changiz	5
1981–82	TFL	13	5	6	2	15	10	16	4th	QF*	NH	NH		A. Changiz	4
1982–83	TFL	17	11	5	1	32	11	27	2nd	QF*	NH	NH		P. Mazloumi; A. Changiz	8
1983–84	TFL	17	12	4	1	28	5	23	1st	R16*	NH	NH		P. Mazloumi	7
1984–85	~~TFL~~	~~6~~	~~6~~	~~0~~	~~0~~	~~15~~	~~3~~	~~12~~	~~Ab~~	NH	NH	NH		A. Changiz	6
1985–86	TFL	11	8	1	2	22	8	17	1st	NH	NH	DNE		A. Changiz; J. Mokhtarifar	6
1986–87	TFL	10	6	3	1	14	8	15	3rd	DNP R16*	NH	DNE		M. Namjoo-Motlagh; Gh. Fathabadi	3
1987–88	TFL	17	9	5	3	19	7	23	3rd	SF SF*	NH	DNE		P. Mazloumi	9
1988–89	TFL	15	6	7	2	16	12	25	3rd	QF SF*	NH	DNE		M. Garousi	4
1989–90	QL	20	15	3	2	52	10	33	1st	NH	NH	DNE		S. Marfavi	13
1989–90	TFL	12	8	2	2	19	6	26	2nd	NH	NH	DNE		S. Marfavi	6
1990–91	TFL	17	13	4	0	29	5	30	2nd	RU	NH	ACC	W	S. Marfavi	11
1991–92	Div 1	22	12	8	2	30	15	32	2nd	QF R1*	NH	ACC	RU	S. Marfavi	6
1991–92	TFL	15	10	5	0	29	8	25	1st	QF R1*	NH	ACC	RU	S. Marfavi	8
1992–93	Div 1	14	4	8	2	10	8	13	5th	NH	NH	DNE		A. Sarkhab; S. Marfavi	3
1992–93	TSL	7	0	5	2	6	10	5	7th↓	NH	NH	DNE		A. Sarkhab; S. Marfavi	3
1993–94	Div 3	24	16	6	2	45	15	24	1st	QF	NH	DNE		A. Sarkhab	11
1993–94	TSL	6	4	2	0	9	5	10	1st↑	QF	NH	DNE		A. Sarkhab	11
1994–95	Div 1	22	10	7	5	25	20	27	2nd	DNE R16*	NH	DNE		E. Akhtar	11
1995–96	Div 1	30	14	9	7	41	26	51	3rd	W	NH	DNE		E. Akhtar	11
1996–97	Div 1	30	11	8	11	42	39	41	6th	QF	NH	ACWC	4th	S. Marfavi	13
1997–98	Div 1	28	16	10	2	46	21	58	1st	NH	NH	DNE		A. Akbarpour; F. Malekian	9
1998–99	Div 1	30	14	11	5	50	28	53	2nd	RU	NH	ACC	RU	A. Mousavi	10
1999–2000	Div 1	26	12	11	3	32	16	47	2nd	W	NH	ACWC	R2	A. Latifi	5
2000–01	Div 1	22	15	5	2	52	21	50	1st	SF	NH	ACWC	4th	A. Samereh	14
2001–02	IPL	26	13	9	4	38	21	48	2nd	W	NH	ACC	3rd	S. Dinmohammadi; F. Fatemi	7
2002–03	IPL	26	8	8	10	32	30	32	9th	R16	NH	ACL	G	A. Samereh; A. Nikbakht	6
2003–04	IPL	26	14	9	3	46	31	51	2nd	RU	NH	DNE		R. Enayati	11
2004–05	IPL	30	16	10	4	51	35	58	3rd	R32	NH	DNE		R. Enayati	20
2005–06	IPL	30	16	11	3	44	17	59	1st	QF	DNE	DNE		R. Enayati	21
2006–07	IPL	30	14	10	6	39	30	52	4th	R32	NH	Disqualified		M. Baou	6
2007–08	IPL	34	11	10	13	44	44	43	13th	W	NH	DNE		A. Borhani	8
2008–09	IPL	34	19	9	6	70	34	66	1st	R32	NH	ACL	G	A. Borhani	20
2009–10	IPL	34	16	11	7	49	32	59	3rd	R16	NH	ACL	R16	A. Borhani	11
2010–11	IPL	34	18	11	5	55	34	65	2nd	SF	NH	ACL	G	A. Borhani	14
2011–12	IPL	34	19	9	6	58	34	66	3rd	W	NH	ACL	R16	M. Jabari	10
2012–13	IPL	34	19	10	5	42	18	67	1st	SF	NH	ACL	R16 ♦	A. Borhani	10
2013–14	IPL	30	15	9	6	34	25	53	5th	SF	NH	ACL	SF	M. Ghazi	7
2013–14	IPL	30	15	9	6	34	25	53	5th	SF	NH	ACL	G	M. Ghazi	7
2014–15	IPL	30	13	8	9	40	34	47	6th	QF	NH	DNE		S. Shahbazzadeh	12
2015–16	IPL	30	13	13	4	43	28	52	3rd	RU	NH	DNE		O. Ebrahimi	10
2016–17	IPL	30	16	9	5	45	27	57	2nd	QF	DNE	ACL	R16	K. Rezaei	7
2017–18	IPL	30	15	9	6	43	18	54	3rd	W	DNE	ACL	R16 ♦	A. Ghorbani	7
2018–19	IPL	30	16	9	5	40	13	57	3rd	R16	DNP	ACL	QF	M. Tabrizi	5
2018–19	IPL	30	16	9	5	40	13	57	3rd	R16	DNP	ACL	G	M. Tabrizi	5
2019–20	IPL	30	14	11	5	55	31	53	2nd	RU	DNE	ACL	R16	Ch. Diabaté	15
2020–21	IPL	30	16	8	6	36	19	56	3rd	RU	DNE	ACL	R16	A. Motahari	7
2021–22	IPL	30	19	11	0	39	10	68	1st	QF	DNE	Disqualified		A. Yamga	10
2022–23	IPL	30	18	8	4	52	22	62	3rd	RU	W	NH		M. Ghayedi	12
2023–24	IPL	30	19	10	1	40	15	67	2nd	R32	DNE	Disqualified		M. Mohammadi	8
2024–25	IPL	30	7	13	10	30	33	34	9th	W	DNE	ACLE	R16	R. Rezaeian	10
2025–26 ongoing	IPL	22	11	8	3	29	16	41	1st	R8	DNE	ACL2	R16	J. Asani	7

== See also ==
- List of Esteghlal F.C. records and statistics
- List of Esteghlal F.C. honours

== Sources ==
- Esteghlal seasons stats Page
- Iran Premier League Stats
- RSSSF database about Iranian league football.
- Persian League

== Bibliography ==
- Ahmadi, Seyyed Ali Akbar (21 December 2009). Esteghlal Full History of the Club from Docharkheh Savaran and Taj to Esteghlal. Paygan. ISBN 978-600-5096-54-5.
