= 2004–05 Esteghlal F.C. season =

Esteghlal F.C.
2004–05 season
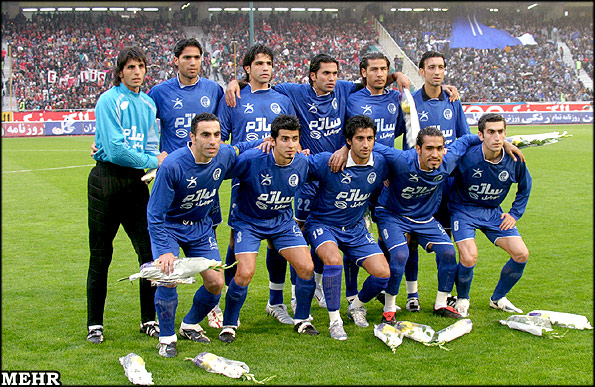
- President: Hossein Gharib
- Head coach: Amir Ghalenoie
- Stadium: Azadi Stadium
- IPL: 3rd
- Hazfi Cup: Round of 16
- Top goalscorer: League: Reza Enayati (20); All: Reza Enayati (20)
Home colours	Away colours

The 2004–05 season are the Esteghlal Football Club's 4th season in the Iran Pro League, and their 11th consecutive season in the top division of Iranian football. They are also competing in the Hazfi Cup and 60th year in existence as a football club.

== Club ==
=== Kit ===
Supplier: (Iran) Aghili
Sponsor(s): (Japan) Sharp

Home Kit	Away Kit

=== Coaching staff ===
Position	Staff
Head coach	(Iran) Amir Ghalenoei
Assistant coach	(Iran) Samad Marfavi
Assistant coach	(Serbia) Srđan Gemaljević
Goalkeepers coach	(Iran) Hamid Babazadeh
Fitness coach	(Iran) Manouchehr Bahmani
Doctor	(Iran) Dr. Amin Norouzi
Director	(Iran) Ali Nazari Juybari

=== Other information ===
Chairman	(Iran) Hossein Gharib
Ground (capacity and dimensions)	Azadi Stadium (100,000 / 110x75m)

== Player ==
As of 1 September 2013. Esteghlal F.C. Iran Pro League Squad 2004–05

Note: Flags indicate national team as defined under FIFA eligibility rules; some limited exceptions apply. Players may hold more than one non-FIFA nationality.

No.	Pos.	Nation	Player
1	GK	SCG	Đorđe Topalović
2	DF	IRN	Amir Hossein Sadeghi
3	DF	IRN	Mehdi Amirabadi
4	MF	IRN	Behshad Yavarzadeh
5	DF	IRN	Sebo Shahbazian
6	DF	IRN	Mahmoud Fekri
7	DF	IRN	Saeed Lotfi
8	MF	IRN	Mehdi Shiri
9	FW	IRN	Ali Samereh
10	MF	IRN	Alireza Mansourian
11	FW	IRN	Reza Enayati
12	MF	IRN	Mojahed Khaziravi
13	MF	IRN	Mostafa Ekrami
14	MF	IRN	Hossein Kazemi

No.	Pos.	Nation	Player
15	MF	IRN	Farzad Majidi
16	FW	IRN	Alireza Akbarpour
17	MF	IRN	Maysam Baou
18	FW	IRN	Fred Malekian
19	DF	IRN	Davoud Haghdoost
20	DF	IRN	Pirouz Ghorbani
22	MF	IRN	Alireza Nikbakht
23	MF	GEO	Akvsenti Gilauri
24	FW	IRN	Siavash Akbarpour
26	DF	IRN	Mojtaba Ensafi
30	GK	IRN	Vahid Talebloo
31	MF	IRN	Shahin Kheiri

== Competitions ==
=== Overall ===
Competition	Started round	Current position / round	Final position / round	First match	Last match
2004–05 Iran Pro League	—	—	3rd	September 13, 2004	June 20, 2005
2004–05 Hazfi Cup	Round of 16	—	Round of 16	15 March 2005	15 March 2005

Updated to match played 3 July 2013
Source: Competitions

=== Iran Pro League ===
==== Standings ====
Pos	Team	Pld	W	D	L	GF	GA	GD	Pts	Qualification or relegation
1	Foolad (C)	30	19	7	4	41	20	+21	64	Qualification for the 2006 AFC Champions League
2	Zob Ahan	30	17	7	6	38	19	+19	58	
3	Esteghlal	30	16	10	4	51	35	+16	58	
4	Persepolis	30	16	7	7	43	27	+16	55	
5	Est. Ahvaz	30	12	8	10	41	34	+7	44	

Updated to match(es) played on 1 September 2018. Source: IPL Stats, Soccerway
Rules for classification: 1) Points; 2) Goal difference; 3) Goals scored.
(C) Champions

==== Results summary ====
Overall								Home						Away					
Pld	W	D	L	GF	GA	GD	Pts	W	D	L	GF	GA	GD	W	D	L	GF	GA	GD
30	16	10	4	51	35	+16	58	10	3	2	33	22	+11	6	7	2	18	13	+5

Last updated: 17 June 2013.
Source: Ipl Stats

==== Results by round ====
Round	1	2	3	4	5	6	7	8	9	10	11	12	13	14	15	16	17	18	19	20	21	22	23	24	25	26	27	28	29	30
Ground	H	A	H	A	H	A	H	A	H	A	H	A	H	A	A	A	H	A	H	A	H	A	H	A	H	A	H	A	H	H
Result	D	D	W	W	W	D	D	L	L	W	W	D	W	D	D	D	W	D	W	W	W	W	L	L	W	W	W	W	W	D

Source: Competitive matches
A = Away; H = Home; W = Win; D = Draw; L = Loss

==== Matches ====
Win Draw Loss Postponed

13 September 2004 1	Esteghlal Ahvaz	1–1	Esteghlal
			Alireza Nikbakht

17 September 2004 2	Saba Battery	1–1	Esteghlal
			Reza Enayati

23 September 2004 3	Esteghlal	2–1	Fajr Sepasi
	Reza Enayati 54'; Ali Samereh 59'

30 September 2004 4	Pegah Gilan	1–2	Esteghlal
			Akvsenti Gilauri 24'; Reza Enayati 54'

17 October 2004 5	Esteghlal	2–1	PAS
	Ali Samereh; Ali Samereh

22 October 2004 6	Persepolis	0–0	Esteghlal

29 October 2004 7	Esteghlal	2–2	Aboomoslem
	Farzad Majidi; Siavash Akbarpour

11 November 2004 8	Zob Ahan	3–1	Esteghlal
			Ali Samereh 77'

21 November 2004 9	Esteghlal	1–2	Foolad
	Reza Enayati 55'

26 November 2004 10	Bargh Shiraz	0–3	Esteghlal
			Siavash Akbarpour 28'; Reza Enayati 74'; Alireza Nikbakht 78'

3 December 2004 11	Esteghlal	2–1	Paykan
	Hossein Kazemi; Pirouz Ghorbani 88'

10 December 2004 12	Malavan	0–0	Esteghlal

16 December 2004 13	Esteghlal	3–0	Shamoushak
	Alireza Mansourian 28'; Siavash Akbarpour 28'; Ali Samereh 77'

24 December 2004 14	Saipa	0–0	Esteghlal

31 December 2004 15	Sepahan	2–2	Esteghlal
			Ali Samereh 28'; Reza Enayati 50'

7 January 2005 16	Esteghlal Ahvaz	2–2	Esteghlal
			Reza Enayati 7'; Reza Enayati 39'

13 January 2005 17	Esteghlal	3–1	Saba Battery
	Reza Enayati 17'; Reza Enayati; Reza Enayati

21 January 2005 18	Fajr Sepasi	0–0	Esteghlal

16 February 2005 20	PAS	1–2	Esteghlal
			Reza Enayati 56'; Farzad Majidi 82'

25 February 2005 21	Esteghlal	3–2	Persepolis
	Reza Enayati 53'; Mahmoud Fekri 87'; Pirouz Ghorbani 93'

1 March 2005 19	Esteghlal	2–0	Pegah Gilan
	Reza Enayati 40'; Reza Enayati 93'

5 March 2005 22	Aboomoslem	2–3	Esteghlal
			Reza Enayati 81'; Maysam Baou 82'; Alireza Akbarpour 93'

11 March 2005 23	Esteghlal	0–3	Zob Ahan

10 April 2005 24	Foolad	1–0	Esteghlal

15 April 2005 25	Esteghlal	3–2	Bargh Shiraz
	Reza Enayati 80'; Reza Enayati 85'; Siavash Akbarpour 92'

22 April 2005 26	Paykan	0–1	Esteghlal
			Siavash Akbarpour

28 April 2005 27	Esteghlal	3–1	Malavan
	Alireza Mansourian 28'; Siavash Akbarpour 28' own Goal

8 May 2005 28	Shamoushak	0–1	Esteghlal
			Reza Enayati 77'

12 June 2005 29	Esteghlal	4–3	Saipa
	Hossein Kazemi; Akvsenti Gilauri; Shahin Kheiri; Farzad Majidi

20 June 2005 30	Esteghlal	2–2	Sepahan
	Reza Enayati 13'; Siavash Akbarpour 69'

=== Hazfi Cup ===
Win Draw Loss Postponed

15 March 2005 1/16	Shahin Bushehr	1–1 (a.e.t.) (4–3 p)	Esteghlal

== See also ==
- 2004–05 Iran Pro League
- 2004–05 Hazfi Cup
