= 2003–04 Esteghlal F.C. season =

Esteghlal F.C.
2003–04 season
- President: Hossein Gharib
- Head coach: Amir Ghalenoie
- Stadium: Azadi Stadium
- IPL: 2nd
- Hazfi Cup: Runner-up
- Top goalscorer: League: Reza Enayati (11); All: Reza Enayati (15)
Home colours	Away colours

The 2003–04 season are the Esteghlal Football Club's 3rd season in the Iran Pro League, and their 10th consecutive season in the top division of Iranian football. They are also competing in the Hazfi Cup and 59th year in existence as a football club.

== Club ==
=== Kit ===
Supplier: (Iran) Jouraban
Sponsor(s): (Japan) AIWA

Home Kit	Away Kit

=== Coaching staff ===
Position	Staff
Head coach	(Iran) Amir Ghalenoei
Assistant coach	(Iran) Samad Marfavi
Assistant coach	(Serbia and Montenegro) Srđan Gemaljević
Goalkeepers coach	(Iran) Hamid Babazadeh
Fitness coach	(Iran) Manouchehr Bahmani
Doctor	(Iran) Dr. Amin Norouzi
Director	(Iran) Asghar Hajiloo

=== Other information ===
Chairman	(Iran) Hossein Gharib
Ground (capacity and dimensions)	Azadi Stadium (100,000 / 110x75m)

== Player ==
As of 1 September 2013. Esteghlal F.C. Iran Pro League Squad 2003–04

Note: Flags indicate national team as defined under FIFA eligibility rules; some limited exceptions apply. Players may hold more than one non-FIFA nationality.

No.	Pos.	Nation	Player
1	GK	IRN	Parviz Boroumand
2	DF	IRN	Mojtaba Ensafi
4	DF	IRN	Mohammad Khorramgah
5	DF	IRN	Sebo Shahbazian
6	DF	IRN	Mahmoud Fekri
7	MF	IRN	Sattar Hamedani
8	MF	IRN	Mohammad Navazi
9	FW	IRN	Ali Samereh
10	MF	IRN	Alireza Mansourian
11	MF	IRN	Yadollah Akbari
12	GK	IRN	Masoud Ghasemi
13	DF	BRA	Rafael Gomes
14	DF	IRN	Saeed Lotfi

No.	Pos.	Nation	Player
15	MF	IRN	Farzad Majidi
16	FW	IRN	Alireza Akbarpour
17	FW	BRA	Roger Fabritcio
18	FW	IRN	Faraz Fatemi
19	DF	IRN	Amir Hossein Sadeghi
20	DF	IRN	Pirouz Ghorbani
21	FW	IRN	Reza Enayati
22	MF	IRN	Alireza Nikbakht
23	MF	IRN	Dariush Yazdani
24	MF	IRN	Keivan Sajedi
25	MF	IRN	Mansour Ahmadzadeh
25	DF	IRN	Amir Aminifar
30	GK	IRN	Vahid Talebloo

== Competitions ==
=== Overview ===
Competition	Started round	Current position / round	Final position / round	First match	Last match
2003–04 Iran Pro League	—	—	2nd	August 28, 2003	May 3, 2004
2003–04 Hazfi Cup	Round of 32	—	Runners-up	May 14, 2004	July 15, 2004

Updated to match played 3 July 2013
Source: Competitions

=== Iran Pro League ===
==== Standings ====
Pos	Team	Pld	W	D	L	GF	GA	GD	Pts	Qualification or relegation
1	Pas (C)	26	15	8	3	48	29	+19	53	Qualification for the 2005 AFC Champions League
2	Esteghlal	26	14	9	3	46	31	+15	51	
3	Foolad	26	13	8	5	37	22	+15	47	
4	Zob Ahan	26	11	7	8	32	25	+7	40	
5	Persepolis	26	10	9	7	42	28	+14	39	

Updated to match(es) played on 01 SEP 2018. Source: IPL Stats, Soccerway
Rules for classification: 1) Points; 2) Goal difference; 3) Goals scored.
(C) Champions

==== Results summary ====
Overall								Home						Away					
Pld	W	D	L	GF	GA	GD	Pts	W	D	L	GF	GA	GD	W	D	L	GF	GA	GD
26	14	9	3	46	31	+15	51	8	4	1	27	19	+8	6	5	2	19	12	+7

Last updated: 17 June 2013.
Source: Ipl Stats

==== Results by round ====
Round	1	2	3	4	5	6	7	8	9	10	11	12	13	14	15	16	17	18	19	20	21	22	23	24	25	26
Ground	A	H	A	H	A	H	A	H	A	H	A	H	A	H	A	H	A	H	A	H	A	H	A	H	A	H
Result	D	D	W	W	L	W	W	D	D	D	D	W	W	L	W	W	W	W	D	D	W	W	D	W	L	W

Source: Competitive matches
A = Away; H = Home; W = Win; D = Draw; L = Loss

==== Matches ====
Win Draw Loss Postponed

28 August 2003 1	PAS	2 – 2	Esteghlal
			Alireza Nikbakht; Yadollah Akbari

9 September 2003 2	Esteghlal	2 – 2	Bargh Shiraz
	Farzad Majidi; Farzad Majidi

23 September 2003 3	Shamoushak	1 – 2	Esteghlal
			Reza Enayati 17'; Mohammad Navazi 42'

19 September 2003 4	Esteghlal	3 – 2	Saipa
	Alireza Nikbakht 11'; Farzad Majidi 30'; Farzad Majidi 95'

30 September 2003 5	Zob Ahan	2 – 1	Esteghlal
			Mohammad Navazi

7 October 2003 6	Esteghlal	3 – 1	Foolad
	Roger Fabritcio 7'; Farzad Majidi 67'; Reza Enayati 88'

16 October 2003 7	Persepolis	1 – 2	Esteghlal
			Ali Samereh 9'; Mahmoud Fekri 54'

23 October 2003 8	Esteghlal	3 – 3	Aboomoslem
	Ali Samereh 30'; Ali Samereh 71'; Reza Enayati 89'

6 November 2003 9	Fajr Sepasi	2 – 2	Esteghlal
			Faraz Fatemi 14'; Alireza Nikbakht 43'

10 November 2003 10	Esteghlal	2 – 2	Paykan
	Ali Samereh 53'; Ali Samereh 56'

30 November 2003 11	Sepahan	0 – 0	Esteghlal

7 December 2003 12	Esteghlal	2 – 1	Esteghlal Ahvaz
	Alireza Mansourian 27'; Reza Enayati 67'

12 December 2003 13	Pegah Gilan	0 – 1	Esteghlal
			Reza Enayati 25'

19 December 2003 14	Esteghlal	0 – 1	PAS

25 December 2003 15	Bargh Shiraz	0 – 2	Esteghlal
			Amir Hossein Sadeghi 51'; Reza Enayati 81'

6 January 2004 16	Esteghlal	2 – 1	Shamoushak
	Reza Enayati; Ali Samereh

11 January 2004 17	Saipa	0 – 3	Esteghlal
			Reza Enayati; Mohammad Navazi; Reza Enayati 85'

15 January 2004 18	Esteghlal	1 – 0	Zob Ahan
	Yadollah Akbari 40'

22 January 2004 19	Foolad	1 – 1	Esteghlal
			Yadollah Akbari 25'

2 February 2004 20	Esteghlal	1 – 1	Persepolis
	Davoud Seyed Abbasi 3'

26 February 2004 21	Aboomoslem	0 – 1	Esteghlal
			Farzad Majidi 40'

8 March 2004 22	Esteghlal	3 – 2	Fajr Sepasi
	Davoud Seyed Abbasi 41'; Yadollah Akbari 48'; Faraz Fatemi 77'

5 April 2004 23	Paykan	1 – 1	Esteghlal
			Farzad Majidi 70'

12 April 2004 24	Esteghlal	2 – 1	Sepahan
	Reza Enayati 3'; Ali Samereh 82'

26 April 2004 25	Esteghlal Ahvaz	2 – 1	Esteghlal
			Sattar Hamedani 90'

3 May 2004 26	Esteghlal	3 – 2	Pegah Gilan
	Reza Enayati 14'; Alireza Mansourian 57'; Mohammad Navazi 94'

=== Hazfi Cup ===
==== Round of 32 ====
9 May 2004 First leg	Farmandari Marivan	0 – 2	Esteghlal

14 May 2004 Second leg	Esteghlal	9 – 0 (11 – 0 agg.)	Farmandari Marivan

==== Round of 16 ====
11 June 2004	Esteghlal	3 – 2	Pasargad
	Saeed Lotfi; Yadollah Akbari; Reza Enayati

==== Quarter-final ====
18 June 2004	Paykan	0 – 1 (a.e.t.)	Esteghlal
			Reza Enayati 101'

==== Semi-final ====
27 June 2004	Esteghlal	2 – 1	Saipa
	Yadollah Akbari; Alireza Nikbakht

==== Final ====
2 July 2004 First leg	Sepahan	3 – 2	Esteghlal
			Yadollah Akbari 27'; Reza Enayati 80'

7 July 2004 Second leg	Esteghlal	0 – 2 (2 – 5 agg.)	Sepahan

== Friendlies ==
=== During season ===
Win Draw Loss Postponed

24 January 2004 1	Stuttgart (Germany)	3 – 0	(Iran) Esteghlal	Stuttgart, Germany

== See also ==
- 2003–04 Iran Pro League
- 2003–04 Hazfi Cup
