= 2005–06 Esteghlal F.C. season =

Esteghlal F.C.
2005–06 season
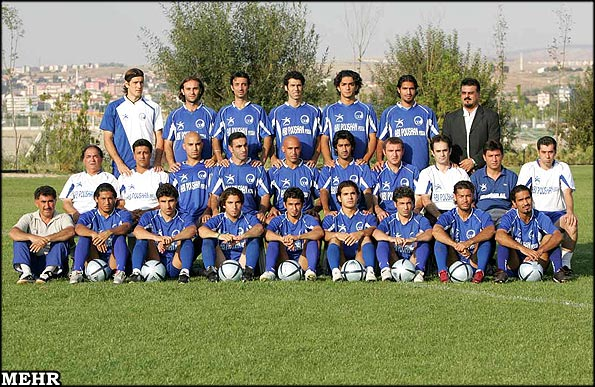
- President: Mohammad Hossein Gharib
- Head coach: Amir Ghalenoei
- Stadium: Azadi Stadium
- IPL: Champions
- Hazfi Cup: Quarterfinals
- Top goalscorer: League: Reza Enayati (21); All: Reza Enayati (22)
Home colours	Away colours

The 2005–06 season was the Esteghlal Football Club's 5th season in the Iran Pro League, and their 12th consecutive season in the top division of Iranian football. They are also competing in the Hazfi Cup and 61st year in existence as a football club.

== Club ==
=== Kit ===
Supplier: (Iran) Abi Pooshan
Sponsor(s): (France) SAGEM

Home Kit	Away Kit

=== Coaching staff ===
Position	Staff
Head coach	(Iran) Amir Ghalenoei
Assistant coach	(Iran) Samad Marfavi
Goalkeepers coach	(Iran) Hamid Babazadeh
Fitness coach	(Iran) Manouchehr Bahmani
Doctor	(Iran) Dr. Amin Norouzi
Director	(Iran) Ali Nazari Juybari

=== Other information ===
Chairman	(Iran) Hossein Gharib
Ground (capacity and dimensions)	Azadi Stadium (100,000 / 110x75m)

== Player ==
As of 1 September 2013. Esteghlal F.C. Iran Pro League Squad 2005–06

Note: Flags indicate national team as defined under FIFA eligibility rules; some limited exceptions apply. Players may hold more than one non-FIFA nationality.

No.	Pos.	Nation	Player
1	GK	IRI	Vahid Taleblou
2	DF	IRI	Amir Hossein Sadeghi
3	DF	IRI	Mehdi Amirabadi
4	MF	IRI	Hossein Kazemi
5	DF	IRI	Sebo Shahbazian
6	DF	IRI	Mahmoud Fekri
7	DF	IRI	Saeed Lotfi
8	MF	IRI	Mojtaba Jabari
9	FW	IRI	Siavash Akbarpour
10	MF	IRI	Alireza Mansourian
11	FW	IRI	Reza Enayati
14	DF	IRI	Morteza Ebrahimi
15	MF	IRI	Farzad Majidi

No.	Pos.	Nation	Player
16	FW	IRI	Alireza Akbarpour
17	MF	IRI	Maysam Baou
18	FW	IRI	Morteza Hashemizadeh
19	MF	IRI	Ramin Moharramnejad
20	DF	IRI	Pirouz Ghorbani
21	GK	IRI	Mehdi Rahmati
22	MF	IRI	Alireza Nikbakht
23	MF	GEO	Akvsenti Gilauri
24	FW	IRI	Peyman Naderi
26	MF	IRI	Asghar Talebnasab
31	MF	IRI	Shahin Kheiri
—	DF	IRI	Mojtaba Ensafi

== Competitions ==
=== Overall ===
Competition	Started round	Current position / round	Final position / round	First match	Last match
2005–06 Iran Pro League	—	—	Winner	September 02, 2005	April 21, 2006
2005–06 Hazfi Cup	Round of 16	—	Quarterfinals	January 23, 2006	April 28, 2006

Updated to match played 03 July 2013
Source: Competitions

=== Iran Pro League ===
==== Standings ====
Pos	Team	Pld	W	D	L	GF	GA	GD	Pts
1	Esteghlal (Note: AFC disqualified Esteghlal Tehran from Group B for failing to register their players in time.) (C)	30	16	11	3	44	17	+27	59
2	PAS Tehran	30	16	10	4	54	29	+25	58
3	Saipa	30	13	13	4	41	21	+20	52
4	Saba	30	13	11	6	35	31	+4	50
5	Aboumoslem	30	12	10	8	31	23	+8	46

Updated to match(es) played on 01 SEP 2018. Source: IPL Stats, Soccerway
Rules for classification: 1) Points; 2) Goal difference; 3) Goals scored.
(C) Champions

==== Results summary ====
Overall								Home						Away					
Pld	W	D	L	GF	GA	GD	Pts	W	D	L	GF	GA	GD	W	D	L	GF	GA	GD
30	16	11	3	44	17	+27	59	9	6	0	27	8	+19	7	5	3	17	9	+8

Last updated: 17 June 2013.
Source: Ipl Stats

==== Results by round ====
Round	1	2	3	4	5	6	7	8	9	10	11	12	13	14	15	16	17	18	19	20	21	22	23	24	25	26	27	28	29	30
Ground	H	A	A	H	A	H	A	H	A	H	A	H	A	H	A	A	H	H	A	H	A	H	A	H	A	H	A	H	A	H
Result	W	L	W	D	W	W	L	D	D	W	W	W	D	W	W	D	D	D	L	W	W	W	W	D	D	D	W	W	D	W

Source: Competitive matches
A = Away; H = Home; W = Win; D = Draw; L = Loss

==== Matches ====
Win Draw Loss Postponed

2 September 2005 1	Esteghlal	4 – 1	Saba Battery
	Alireza Nikbakht; Reza Enayati; Siavash Akbarpour; Reza Enayati

7 September 2005 2	PAS	1 – 0	Esteghlal

16 September 2005 3	Malavan	2 – 3	Esteghlal
			Siavash Akbarpour 35' own Goal 36'; Siavash Akbarpour 52'

23 September 2005 4	Esteghlal	0 – 0	Aboomoslem

29 September 2005 5	Esteghlal Ahvaz	0 – 2	Esteghlal
			Reza Enayati 11'; Siavash Akbarpour 90'

3 October 2005 6	Esteghlal	3 – 0	Rah Ahan
	Siavash Akbarpour; Reza Enayati; Reza Enayati

16 October 2005 7	Sepahan	1 – 0	Esteghlal

21 October 2005 8	Esteghlal	0 – 0	Fajr Sepasi

29 October 2005 9	Saipa	0 – 0	Esteghlal

4 November 2005 10	Esteghlal	1 – 0	Persepolis
	Reza Enayati 56'

15 November 2005 11	Shamoushak	0 – 1	Esteghlal
			Mojtaba Jabbari 76'

20 November 2005 12	Esteghlal	1 – 0	Shahid Ghandi
	Siavash Akbarpour 89'

25 November 2005 13	Foolad	0 – 0	Esteghlal

16 December 2005 14	Esteghlal	3 – 0	Zob Ahan
	Mojtaba Jabbari 67'; Reza Enayati 82'; Amir Hossein Sadeghi 86'

23 December 2005 15	Bargh Shiraz	1 – 3	Esteghlal
			Reza Enayati 40'; Siavash Akbarpour 86'; Mojtaba Jabbari 93'

29 December 2005 16	Saba Battery	1 – 1	Esteghlal
			Amir Hossein Sadeghi 14'

6 January 2006 17	Esteghlal	0 – 0	PAS

19 January 2006 19	Aboomoslem	1 – 0	Esteghlal

27 January 2006 20	Esteghlal	1 – 0	Esteghlal Ahvaz
	Reza Enayati 33'

31 January 2006 18	Esteghlal	3 – 3	Malavan
	Reza Enayati 2'; Reza Enayati 6'; Reza Enayati 41'

6 February 2006 21	Rah Ahan	1 – 2	Esteghlal
			Siavash Akbarpour 32'; Mojtaba Jabbari 56'

12 February 2006 22	Esteghlal	2 – 1	Sepahan
	Amir Hossein Sadeghi 55'; Mojtaba Jabbari 57'

16 February 2006 23	Fajr Sepasi	0 – 3	Esteghlal
			Siavash Akbarpour 36'; Reza Enayati 50'; Reza Enayati 80'

4 March 2006 24	Esteghlal	0 – 0	Saipa

10 March 2006 25	Persepolis	0 – 0	Esteghlal

17 March 2006 26	Esteghlal	1 – 1	Shamoushak
	Reza Enayati 19'

31 March 2006 27	Shahid Ghandi	0 – 1	Esteghlal
			Hossein Kazemi

6 April 2006 28	Esteghlal	4 – 1	Foolad
	Reza Enayati 45'; Hossein Kazemi 56'; Reza Enayati 66'; Reza Enayati 89'

16 April 2006 29	Zob Ahan	1 – 1	Esteghlal
			Reza Enayati 9'

21 April 2006 30	Esteghlal	4 – 1	Bargh Shiraz
	Reza Enayati 9'; Siavash Akbarpour 12'; Siavash Akbarpour 73'; Reza Enayati 76'

=== Hazfi Cup ===
Win Draw Loss Postponed

Jan 23, 2006 1/16	Esteghlal	2 – 0	Etka Tehran	Tehran
	Nikbakht 75'; Enayati 89'	report		Stadium: Azadi Stadium

Apr 25, 2006 1/8	Esteghlal	3 – 0	Shahin Bushehr	Tehran
		report		Stadium: Azadi Stadium; Referee: None
Note: Shahin withdrew

Apr 29, 2006 Quarterfinals	Nozhan Sari	3 – 0	Esteghlal	Sari
		report		Stadium: Shohada Stadium; Referee: None
Note: Esteghlal withdrew after winning the league championship, considering that to be enough silverware for the season.

== See also ==
- 2005–06 Iran Pro League
- 2005–06 Hazfi Cup
