= 2006–07 Esteghlal F.C. season =

Esteghlal F.C.
2006–07 season
- President: Hossein Gharib (until September 2006); Meghdad Najafnejad (September 2006)
- Head coach: Samad Marfavi
- Stadium: Azadi Stadium
- IPL: 4th
- Hazfi Cup: 1/16-Final
- Champions League: Disqualified
Home colours	Away colours

The 2006–07 season are the Esteghlal Football Club's 6th season in the Iran Pro League, and their 13th consecutive season in the top division of Iranian football. They are also competing in the Hazfi Cup and 62nd year in existence as a football club.

== Player ==
As of 1 September 2013. Esteghlal F.C. Iran Pro League Squad 2006–07

Note: Flags indicate national team as defined under FIFA eligibility rules; some limited exceptions apply. Players may hold more than one non-FIFA nationality.

No.	Pos.	Nation	Player
1	GK	IRN	Vahid Taleblou
2	DF	IRN	Amir Hossein Sadeghi
3	DF	IRN	Mehdi Amirabadi
4	MF	IRN	Hossein Kazemi
5	DF	IRN	Saeed Lotfi
6	DF	IRN	Mahmoud Fekri
7	MF	IRN	Mohammad Navazi
8	MF	IRN	Mojtaba Jabari
9	FW	IRN	Siavash Akbarpour
10	MF	IRN	Alireza Mansourian
13	MF	IRN	Mohsen Yousefi
14	DF	IRN	Morteza Ebrahimi
15	MF	IRN	Farzad Majidi

No.	Pos.	Nation	Player
16	FW	BRA	Joílson da Silva
17	MF	IRN	Maysam Baou
18	FW	IRN	Morteza Hashemizadeh
19	FW	IRN	Ali Alizadeh
20	DF	IRN	Pirouz Ghorbani
21	GK	IRN	Mehdi Rahmati
22	MF	IRN	Behshad Yavarzadeh
23	MF	GEO	Akvsenti Gilauri
25	MF	IRN	Bagher Ahmadi
26	MF	IRN	Asghar Talebnasab
28	DF	IRN	Ali Ansarian
30	GK	IRN	Mahyar Hassannejad

== Transfers ==
Confirmed transfers 2006–07

In: Note: Flags indicate national team as defined under FIFA eligibility rules; some limited exceptions apply. Players may hold more than one non-FIFA nationality.

No.	Pos.	Nation	Player
30	GK	IRN	Mahyar Hassannejad (from Saipa)
25	MF	IRN	Bagher Ahmadi (from Esteghlal Ahvaz)
19	FW	IRN	Ali Alizadeh (from Persepolis)
28	DF	IRN	Ali Ansarian (from Persepolis)
7	MF	IRN	Mohammad Navazi (from Saba Battery)
22	MF	IRN	Behshad Yavarzadeh (from Shahid Ghandi)
13	MF	IRN	Mohsen Yousefi (from Shemushack Noshahr)
16	FW	BRA	Joílson Rodrigues da Silva (from Zob Ahan)

Out: Note: Flags indicate national team as defined under FIFA eligibility rules; some limited exceptions apply. Players may hold more than one non-FIFA nationality.

No.	Pos.	Nation	Player
11	FW	IRN	Reza Enayati (to (Qatar) Al-Emarat)
16	FW	IRN	Alireza Akbarpour (to Homa)
—	DF	IRN	Mojtaba Insafi (to Bargh Shiraz)
31	MF	IRN	Shahin Kheiri (to Mes Kerman)
22	MF	IRN	Alireza Vahedi Nikbakht (to Persepolis)
5	DF	IRN	Sebo Shahbazian (to Saba Battery)
19	DF	IRN	Ramin Moharramnejad (to AlEmarat)

== Competitions ==
=== Overall ===
Competition	Started round	Current position / round	Final position / round	First match	Last match
2006–07 Persian Gulf Cup	—	—	4th	9 September 2006	28 May 2006
2006–07 Hazfi Cup	Round of 16	—	Round of 16	19 January 2007	19 January 2007
2007 AFC Champions League	Group stage	—	Group stage	—	—

Updated to match played 03 July 2013
Source: Competitions

=== Iran Pro League ===
==== Standings ====
Pos	Team	Pld	W	D	L	GF	GA	GD	Pts	Promotion or relegation
2	Est. Ahvaz	30	16	6	8	33	28	+5	54	
3	Persepolis	30	14	11	5	49	33	+16	53	
4	Esteghlal	30	14	10	6	39	30	+9	52	
5	Sepahan	30	14	7	9	41	28	+13	49	Qualification for the AFC Champions League 2008
6	Aboomoslem	30	11	10	9	40	36	+4	43	

Updated to match(es) played on May 27, 2007. Source:
Rules for classification: 1) points; 2) goal difference; 3) number of goals scored.

==== Results summary ====
Overall								Home						Away					
Pld	W	D	L	GF	GA	GD	Pts	W	D	L	GF	GA	GD	W	D	L	GF	GA	GD
30	14	10	6	39	30	+9	52	8	5	2	23	15	+8	6	5	4	16	15	+1

Last updated: 17 June 2013.
Source: Stats

==== Results by round ====
Round	1	2	3	4	5	6	7	8	9	10	11	12	13	14	15	16	17	18	19	20	21	22	23	24	25	26	27	28	29	30
Ground	H	A	H	A	H	A	H	A	H	A	H	A	H	A	H	A	H	A	H	A	H	A	H	A	H	A	H	A	H	A
Result	W	W	W	D	D	W	D	L	W	W	W	W	L	L	W	D	D	D	W	W	W	W	D	D	W	L	D	L	L	D

Source: "Ipl".
A = Away; H = Home; W = Win; D = Draw; L = Loss

==== Matches ====
Win Draw Loss Postponed

1	Esteghlal	2–1	Zob Ahan
	Mohammad Navazi 28'; Pirouz Ghorbani 85'

2	Mes Kerman	0–1	Esteghlal
			Ali Ansarian 80'

3	Esteghlal	3–2	Fajr Sepasi
	Joílson da Silva 18'; Asghar Talebnasab 61'; Alireza Mansourian 84'

4	Foolad	0–0	Esteghlal

5	Esteghlal	1–1	Saba Battery
	Alireza Mansourian 73'

6	Malavan	0–1	Esteghlal
			Ali Ansarian 86'

7	Esteghlal	1–1	Rah Ahan
	Joílson da Silva 28'

8	Persepolis	2–1	Esteghlal
			Amir Hossein Sadeghi 16'

9	Esteghlal	1–0	Aboomoslem
	Maysam Baou 30'

10	Bargh Shiraz	1–2	Esteghlal
			Asghar Talebnasab 12'; Siavash Akbarpour 22'

11	Esteghlal	2–1	Sepahan
	Maysam Baou 39'; Maysam Baou 91'

12	Esteghlal Ahvaz	0–1	Esteghlal
			Mohsen Yousefi 31'

13	Esteghlal	0–1	Paykan

14	Saipa	3–1	Esteghlal
			Hossein Kazemi 29'

15	Esteghlal	2–1	PAS
	Morteza Hashemizadeh 50'; Pirouz Ghorbani 67'

16	Zob Ahan	0–0	Esteghlal

17	Esteghlal	0–0	Mes Kerman

18	Fajr Sepasi	1–1	Esteghlal
			Maysam Baou 81'

19	Esteghlal	3–2	Foolad
	Farzad Majidi 26'; Siavash Akbarpour 55'; Maysam Baou 65'

20	Saba Battery	2–3	Esteghlal
			Ali Alizadeh 7'; Ali Ansarian 60'; Amir Hossein Sadeghi 88'

21	Esteghlal	2–1	Malavan
	Pirouz Ghorbani 73'; Siavash Akbarpour 89'

22	Rah Ahan	1–2	Esteghlal
			Pirouz Ghorbani 35'; Ali Ansarian 70'

23	Esteghlal	1–1	Persepolis
	own Goal 42'

24	Aboomoslem	1–1	Esteghlal
			Maysam Baou 31'

25	Esteghlal	3–0	Bargh Shiraz
	Ali Alizadeh 66'; Hossein Kazemi 73'; Mohsen Yousefi 76'

26	Sepahan	1–0	Esteghlal

27	Esteghlal Ahvaz	1–1	Esteghlal
	Hossein Kazemi 77'

28	Paykan	2–1	Esteghlal
			Siavash Akbarpour 33'

29	Esteghlal	1–2	Saipa
	Siavash Akbarpour 35'

30	PAS	1–1	Esteghlal
			Joílson da Silva 90'

=== Hazfi Cup ===
19 January 2007 1/16	Moghavemat Basij	2–1	Esteghlal

=== AFC Champions League ===
==== Group stage ====
===== Group D =====
Esteghlal Tehran was disqualified from Group B for failing to register their players list in time.

== See also ==
- 2006–07 Iran Pro League
- 2006–07 Hazfi Cup
