= 2002–03 Esteghlal F.C. season =

Esteghlal F.C.
2002–03 season
- President: Ali Fathollahzadeh
- Head coach: Roland Koch (until 20 April 2003); Javad Zarincheh (from 24 April 2003 until 14 May 2003); Mansour Pourheidari (from 15 May 2003)
- Stadium: Takhti Stadium
- IPL: 9th
- Hazfi Cup: Round of 16
- Champions League: Group stage
- Top goalscorer: League: Ali Samereh (6); All: Ali Samereh (9)
Home colours	Away colours

The 2002–03 season are the Esteghlal Football Club's 2nd season in the Iran Pro League, and their 9th consecutive season in the top division of Iranian football. They are also competing in the Hazfi Cup and AFC Champions League, and 58th year in existence as a football club.

== Club ==
=== Kit ===
Supplier: (Iran) Daei SWE
Sponsor(s): (South Korea) LG, (Iran) Talash Motorcycle

Home Kit	Away Kit

=== Coaching staff ===
Position	Staff
Head coach	(Iran) Amir Ghalenoei
Assistant coach	(Iran) Ebrahim Talebi
Goalkeepers coach	(Iran) Ahmad Maleki
Fitness coach	(Iran) Valiollah Salehnia
Doctor	(Iran) Dr. Amin Norouzi
Director	(Iran) Nasrollah Abdollahi

=== Other information ===
Chairman	(Iran) Hossein Gharib
Ground (capacity and dimensions)	Azadi Stadium (100,000 / 110x75m)

== Player ==
As of 1 September 2013. Esteghlal F.C. Iran Pro League Squad 2002–03

Note: Flags indicate national team as defined under FIFA eligibility rules; some limited exceptions apply. Players may hold more than one non-FIFA nationality.

No.	Pos.	Nation	Player
1	GK	IRN	Hadi Tabatabaei
2	DF	IRN	Javad Zarincheh
4	DF	IRN	Mohammad Khorramgah
5	DF	IRN	Sohrab Bakhtiarizadeh
6	DF	IRN	Mahmoud Fekri
7	MF	IRN	Sattar Hamedani
8	MF	IRN	Mohammad Navazi
9	FW	IRN	Ali Mousavi
10	DF	IRN	Mehdi Pashazadeh
11	MF	IRN	Yadollah Akbari
12	MF	IRN	Alireza Mansourian
14	MF	IRN	Sirous Dinmohammadi
15	MF	IRN	Farzad Majidi
16	FW	IRN	Alireza Akbarpour

No.	Pos.	Nation	Player
17	FW	IRN	Ahmad Momenzadeh
18	FW	IRN	Faraz Fatemi
19	DF	IRN	Pirouz Ghorbani
20	DF	IRN	Mehdi Hasheminasab
21	DF	IRN	Amir Aminifar
21	DF	IRN	Davood Rostami
22	MF	IRN	Alireza Nikbakht
23	FW	IRN	Ali Samereh
24	MF	IRN	Ahmad Feyz-Karimloo
26	DF	IRN	Amir Hossein Sadeghi
29	GK	IRN	Masoud Ghasemi
30	GK	IRN	Parviz Boroumand
—	FW	IRN	Daryoush Ayyoubi

== Competitions ==
=== Overview ===
Competition	Started round	Current position / round	Final position / round	First match	Last match
2002–03 Iran Pro League	—	—	9th	October 17, 2002	June 22, 2003
2002–03 Hazfi Cup	Round of 32	—	Round of 32	November 17, 2002	May 15, 2003
2002–03 AFC Champions League	Qualifying play-off	—	Group stage	March 9, 2003	March 15, 2003

Updated to match played 03 July 2013
Source: Competitions

=== Iran Pro League ===
==== Standings ====
Pos	Team	Pld	W	D	L	GF	GA	GD	Pts	Qualification or relegation
7	Foolad	26	9	7	10	34	36	−2	34	
8	Zob Ahan	26	10	4	12	22	29	−7	34	Qualification for the 2004 AFC Champions League
9	Esteghlal	26	8	8	10	32	30	+2	32	
10	Bargh	26	9	5	12	28	37	−9	32	
11	Est. Ahvaz	26	6	10	10	24	30	−6	28	

Source: IPL Stats, Soccerway
Rules for classification: 1) Points; 2) Goal difference; 3) Goals scored.

==== Results summary ====
Overall								Home						Away					
Pld	W	D	L	GF	GA	GD	Pts	W	D	L	GF	GA	GD	W	D	L	GF	GA	GD
26	8	8	10	32	30	+2	32	4	4	5	14	13	+1	4	4	5	18	17	+1

Last updated: 17 June 2013.
Source: Ipl Stats

==== Results by round ====
Round	1	2	3	4	5	6	7	8	9	10	11	12	13	14	15	16	17	18	19	20	21	22	23	24	25	26
Ground	H	A	H	A	H	H	A	H	A	H	A	H	A	A	H	A	H	A	A	H	A	H	A	H	A	H
Result	W	L	L	D	W	D	W	W	L	D	D	D	W	D	W	L	D	D	W	L	L	L	W	L	L	L

Source: Competitive matches
A = Away; H = Home; W = Win; D = Draw; L = Loss

==== Matches ====
Win Draw Loss Postponed

17 October 2002 1	Esteghlal	3–1	PAS
	Alireza Nikbakht; Ali Samereh; Faraz Fatemi

30 October 2002 2	Sanat Naft Abadan	1–0	Esteghlal

3 November 2002 3	Esteghlal	2–3	Sepahan
	Alireza Nikbakht 52'; Yadollah Akbari 71'

8 November 2002 4	Aboomoslem	2–2	Esteghlal
			Mehdi Hasheminasab; Mehdi Hasheminasab

3 December 2002 5	Esteghlal	3–0	Malavan
	Ahmad Momenzadeh; Faraz Fatemi; Ahmad Momenzadeh

8 December 2002 6	Esteghlal	0–0	Foolad

14 December 2002 7	Bargh Shiraz	1–2	Esteghlal
			Ali Samereh 27'; Alireza Nikbakht 53'

20 December 2002 8	Esteghlal	2–1	Paykan
	Mehdi Hasheminasab; Alireza Nikbakht 90'

26 December 2002 9	Saipa	2–1	Esteghlal
			Mohammad Navazi

3 January 2003 10	Esteghlal	0–0	Zob Ahan

10 January 2003 11	Persepolis	1–1	Esteghlal
			Ali Samereh 1'

19 January 2003 12	Esteghlal	0–0	Esteghlal Ahvaz

24 January 2003 13	Fajr Sepasi	2–3	Esteghlal
			Yadollah Akbari 5'; Ali Samereh 30'; Mehdi Hasheminasab 43'

12 February 2003 14	PAS	1–1	Esteghlal
			Ali Samereh

21 February 2003 15	Esteghlal	1–0	Sanat Naft Abadan
	Farzad Majidi

7 April 2003 18	Malavan	0–0	Esteghlal

14 April 2003 19	Foolad	1–2	Esteghlal
			Farzad Majidi; Alireza Nikbakht

20 April 2003 20	Esteghlal	1–2	Bargh Shiraz

25 April 2003 16	Sepahan	3–2	Esteghlal
			Yadollah Akbari 75' own Goal 80'

29 April 2003 17	Esteghlal	0–0	Aboomoslem

6 May 2003 21	Paykan	1–0	Esteghlal

11 May 2003 22	Esteghlal	1–3	Saipa
	Mohammad Navazi

20 May 2003 23	Zob Ahan	0–3	Esteghlal
			Mehdi Hasheminasab 54'; Ali Samereh 82'; Alireza Nikbakht 88'

13 June 2003 24	Esteghlal	1–2	Persepolis
	Alireza Akbarpour 75'

17 June 2003 25	Esteghlal Ahvaz	2–1	Esteghlal
			Alireza Akbarpour 75'

22 June 2003 26	Esteghlal	0–1	Fajr Sepasi

=== Hazfi Cup ===
==== Round of 32 ====
17 November 2002 First leg	Esteghlal	2–1	Faraz Qom

14 January 2003 Second leg	Faraz Qom	0–2 (1–4 agg.)	Esteghlal

==== Round of 16 ====
16 February 2003 First leg	Sepahan	3–0	Esteghlal

15 May 2003 Second leg	Esteghlal	0–1 (0–4 agg.)	Sepahan

=== AFC Champions League ===
==== Group stage ====
===== Group C =====
Pos	Team	Pld	W	D	L	GF	GA	GD	Pts	Qualification
1	(United Arab Emirates) Al-Ain (H)	3	3	0	0	6	1	+5	9	Advance to Knockout stage
2	(Qatar) Al Sadd	3	1	0	2	4	5	−1	3	
3	(Iran) Esteghlal	3	1	0	2	5	7	−2	3	
4	(Saudi Arabia) Al-Hilal	3	1	0	2	4	6	−2	3	

(H) Hosts

Win Draw Loss Postponed

9 March 2003 1	Al Sadd (Qatar)	1–2	(Iran) Esteghlal	Al Ain, UAE
	Sergio Ricardo 72'	(Report)	Ali Samereh 6'; Rasoul Khatibi 64'	Stadium: Tahnoun Bin Mohamed Stadium; Attendance: 4,500; Referee: (Japan) Toru Kamikawa

12 March 2003 2	Esteghlal (Iran)	2–3	(Saudi Arabia) Al Hilal	Al Ain, UAE
	Rasoul Khatibi 18'; Ali Samereh 42'	(Report)	Patrick Suffo 34', 74', 85'	Stadium: Tahnoun Bin Mohamed Stadium; Attendance: 2,500; Referee: (Malaysia) Subkhdiin Mohd Salleh

15 March 2003 3	Esteghlal (Iran)	1–3	(United Arab Emirates) Al Ain	Al Ain, UAE
	Ali Samereh 67'	(Report)	Faisal Ali 65'; Boubacar Sanogo 76'; Gharib Harib 78'	Stadium: Tahnoun Bin Mohamed Stadium; Attendance: 15,000; Referee: (China) Lu Jun

== See also ==
- 2002–03 Iran Pro League
- 2002–03 Hazfi Cup
- 2002–03 AFC Champions League
