= 2005 Iranian Super Cup =

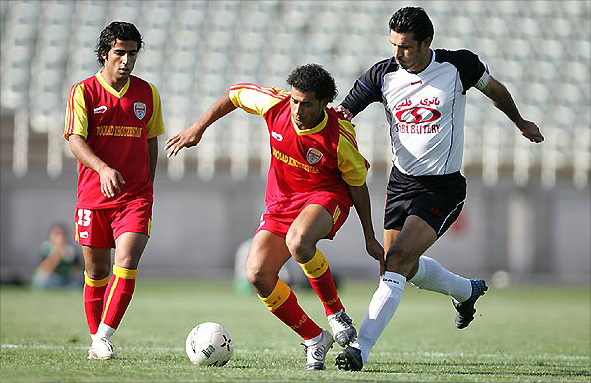
- Football match between Saba Battery and Foolad
Saba	Foolad
Hazfi Cup	Persian Gulf Pro League
4	0
- Extra time
- Date: 28 August 2005
- Venue: Dastgerdi Stadium, Tehran
- Man of the Match: Ali Daei
- Referee: Masoud Moradi
- Attendance: 2,000

The 2005 Iranian Super Cup was the first Iranian Super Cup, held on 28 August 2005 between the 2004–05 Iran Pro League champions Foolad and the 2004–05 Hazfi Cup winners Saba.

== Match ==
28 August 2005
13:00

Foolad	0–4	Saba
		Daei 21' 76'; Markosi 72'; Soltani 78'

Dastgerdi Stadium، Tehran
Attendance: 2,000
Referee: Masoud Moradi

Foolad
GK	(Iran) Ebrahim Mirzapour
DF	(Iran) Mohammad Alavi
DF	(Iran) Jalal Kameli Mofrad	Sent off (straight red)
DF	(Iran) Hossein Kaebi
DF	(Iran) Pejman Montazeri
MF	(Iran) Omid Sharifinasab
(Iran) Ali Elhami	Booked	(substituted off) 46'
MF	(Iran) Adel Kolahkaj	(substituted off) 68'
MF	(Iran) Nader Ahmadi
MF	(Iran) Iman Mobali	Sent off (straight red)
(Iran) Asghar Rameshgar	(substituted off) 68'
Substitutes:
(Iran) Karim Hazbavipour	Booked	(substituted in) 68'
MF	(Iran) Meysam Soleimani	(substituted in) 46'
MF	(Iran) Milad Nouri	(substituted in) 68'
Manager:
(Croatia) Mladen Frančić

Saba Battery
GK	(Bosnia and Herzegovina) Almir Tolja
DF	(Iran) Morteza Asadi
(Iran) Mohsen Soltani	Booked	78'
DF	(Iran) Sohrab Bakhtiarizadeh
(Iran) Amir Alvandi
(Iran) Ali Ghasemian	(substituted off) 85'
MF	(Iran) Mohammad Navazi	Sent off (straight red)
MF	(Iran) Amir Hossein Yousefi	(substituted off) 63'
(Iran) Mostafa Mehdizadeh
FW	(Iran) Saeid Daghighi	(substituted off) 51'
FW	(Iran) Ali Daei	21' 76'
Substitutes:
MF	(Iran) Yadollah Akbari	(substituted in) 63'
(Iran) Babak Zolrahmi	(substituted in) 85'
FW	(Iran) Robert Markosi	72'	(substituted in) 51'
Manager:
(Iran) Majid Jalali
