= Saeed Lotfi =

Saeed Lotfi may refer to:

- Saeed Lotfi (footballer born 1981), Iranian retired football defender
- Saeed Lotfi (footballer born 1992), Iranian football defender who plays for Naft Tehran
