= Rafael Gomes =

Brazilian footballer

Personal information
- Full name: Rafael Gomes dos Santos
- Date of birth: July 12, 1980 (age 46)
- Place of birth: Rio de Janeiro, Brazil
- Height: 1.80 m (5 ft 11 in)
- Position: Defender

Team information
- Current team: Bonsucesso

Senior career*
Years	Team	Apps	(Gls)
2000–2002	Vasco da Gama	-	(-)
2003	Esteghlal	2	(0)
2003	Bragantino	-	(-)
2003–2004	Olaria	-	(-)
2004–2005	Atlético Mineiro	-	(-)
2005–2007	CD Santa Clara	-	(-)
2008	Colorado Rapids	6	(0)
2008	Figueirense	15	(1)
2009	Goiás	11	(0)
2010	Náutico	1	(0)
2010–2011	Vila Nova	6	(0)
2011	Madureira	-	(-)
2011	Itumbiara	5	(0)
2012	Bonsucesso		
- * Club domestic league appearances and goals

Rafael Gomes dos Santos (born 12 July 1980 in Rio de Janeiro, Brazil), sometimes known as just Gomes, is a Brazilian footballer who plays as a defender for Bonsucesso Futebol Clube.

== Career ==
Gomes started his professional career in Brazil, playing for Vasco da Gama, Bragantino, Olaria and Atlético Mineiro. He later moved to Portugal to play for CD Santa Clara before moving to Colorado Rapids in 2008.

He made his Rapids debut as a substitute during a 2–0 loss to San Jose Earthquakes on April 19, 2008. In January 2010 Náutico have signed the centre-back from Goiás.
