= Morteza Asadi =

Iranian football defender and coach

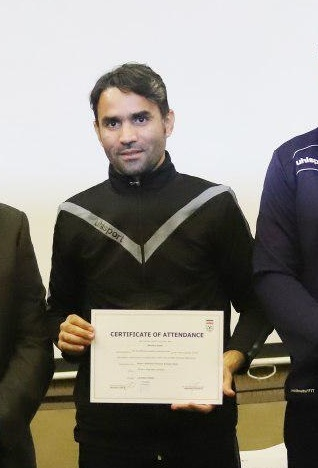
- Asadi in December 2019

Personal information
- Date of birth: February 24, 1979 (age 47)
- Place of birth: Tehran, Iran
- Height: 1.75 m (5 ft 9 in)
- Position: Defender

Team information
- Current team: Pars Jam (assistant coach)

Youth career
- 1997_2002: Persepolis
- 2002_2005: Saba

Senior career*
Years	Team	Apps	(Gls)
2005–2010	Saba	159	(1)
2010–2014	Tractor Sazi	108	(0)
2014–2017	Gostaresh Foolad	86	(0)
2017–2018	Sanat Naft Abadan	27	(0)
2018–2019	Oxin Alborz	0	(0)

International career^{‡}
2007–2010	Iran	4	(0)
- * Club domestic league appearances and goals as of 15 May 2017 ‡ National team caps and goals as of 30 January 2008

Morteza Asadi (born February 24, 1979) is an Iranian football defender and coach.

== Club career ==
Asadi played for Saba Battery F.C. in the 2006 AFC Champions League group stage. He joined Tractor Sazi in 2010. He was Tractor Sazi's captain. He joined Gostaresh on 5 July 2014.

=== Club career statistics ===
Last update: 7 August 2018

Club performance			League		Cup		Continental		Total	
Season	Club	League	Apps	Goals	Apps	Goals	Apps	Goals	Apps	Goals
Iran			League		Hazfi Cup		Asia		Total	
2005–06	Saba	Pro League	29	0	0	0	6	0	35	0
2006–07	Saba	Pro League	30	0	0	0	–	–	30	0
2007–08	Saba	Pro League	31	1	1	0	–	–	32	1
2008–09	Saba	Pro League	32	0	2	0	4	0	38	0
2009–10	Saba	Pro League	30	0	0	0	–	–	30	0
2010–11	Tractor Sazi	Pro League	34	0	1	0	–	–	35	0
2011–12	Tractor Sazi	Pro League	34	0	1	0	–	–	35	0
2012–13	Tractor Sazi	Pro League	33	0	1	0	6	0	40	0
2013–14	Tractor Sazi	Pro League	21	0	4	0	2	0	26	0
2014–15	Gostaresh	Pro League	28	0	0	0	–	–	28	0
2015–16	Gostaresh	Pro League	30	0	0	0	–	–	30	0
2016–17	Gostaresh	Pro League	28	0	0	0	–	–	28	0
2017–18	Sanat Naft	Pro League	20	0	0	0	–	–	20	0
Total	Iran		380	1	10	0	18	0	408	1

- Assist Goals

Season	Team	Assists
05–06	Saba	1
07–08	Saba	1
09–10	Saba	1
10–11	Tractor Sazi	0
11–12	Tractor Sazi	0
12–13	Tractor Sazi	2
13–14	Tractor Sazi	1
14–15	Gostaresh	0

== International career ==
Morteza Asadi made his debut for the senior national team in a friendly match against Belarus in February 2007. He was also called up to join the preliminary squad for the 2007 Asian Cup, but was not included in the final list.

== Personal life ==
Morteza Asadi was born Tehran. He is originally from Ardabil. His nickname in Tabriz football is Türk Oğli.

== Honours ==
Tractor Sazi

- Iran Pro League runner-up (2): 2011–12, 2012–13
- Hazfi Cup (1): 2013–14
