= Roger Fabrizio =

Brazilian footballer

Personal information
- Full name: Roger Fabrizio Roméo
- Place of birth: Brazil
- Position: Centre forward

Senior career*
Years	Team	Apps	(Gls)
2003–2004	Esteghlal	12	(1)
- * Club domestic league appearances and goals

Roger Fabrizio Romeo is a retired Brazilian footballer. He was the first Brazilian who played for Esteghlal in the Premier Football League.

== Club career ==
=== Club career statistics ===
- Last Update: 30 August 2010

Club performance			League		Cup		Continental		Total	
Season	Club	League	Apps	Goals	Apps	Goals	Apps	Goals	Apps	Goals
Iran			League		Hazfi Cup		Asia		Total	
2003–04	Esteghlal	Persian Gulf Cup	12	1	2	1	-	-	14	2
Career total			12	1	2	1	0	0	14	2
