= 2004–05 Hazfi Cup =

Tournament details
- Country: Iran

The Hazfi Cup 2004–05 was the 18th staging of Iran's football knockout competition organized annually by the Football Federation Islamic Republic of Iran.

== Round of 16 ==
Matches were played between 3 April and 26 June 2005.

Home team	Score	Away team
Saba	1–0	Malavan
Iranjavan Boushehr	2–5	Fajr Sepasi
Paykan Tehran	3–1	Shahin Bushehr
Saipa	2–1	Zob Ahan
Ansar Shahroud	1–2	Sanaye Arak
Pegah Gilan	0–1	Esteghlal Ahvaz
Persepolis	0–1	Aboomoslem
PAS	4–1	Sepahan

== Quarter-finals ==
Matches were played between 13 May and 1 July 2005.

Home team	Score	Away team
Fajr Sepasi	0–0	Saipa
Saipa progress 6–5 on penalties.
Saba	4–2	PAS Tehran
Aboomoslem	1–0	Paykan
Esteghlal Ahvaz	(w/o)	Sanaye Arak

== Semifinals ==
Matches were played on 8 July 2005.

Home team	Score	Away team
Saba Battery	4–4	Esteghlal Ahvaz
Saba progress 6–5 on penalties.
Fajr Sepasi	0–0	Aboomoslem
Aboomoslem progress 6–7 on penalties.

== Final ==
Team 1	Agg.	Team 2	1st leg	2nd leg
Saba	2–2	Aboomoslem	1–1	1–1

=== Leg 1 ===
July 12, 2005

Saba	1–1	Aboomoslem
Daghighi 38'		Khalatbari 82'

Saba City Stadium, Tehran
Attendance: 12,000
Referee: Hatam bakpour

=== Leg 2 ===
July 15, 2005

Aboomoslem	1–1	Saba
Fazli 47'	Report	Markosi 86'
Penalties
Jabbari (penalty scored); Teymourian (penalty scored); Fazli (penalty missed); Nasehi (penalty missed)	2–4	(penalty scored) Daei; (penalty scored) Bakhtiarizadeh; (penalty scored) Navazi; (penalty scored) Daghighi

Samen Al-Aeme Stadium, Mashhad
Attendance: 35,000
Referee: Masoud Moradi

== See also ==
- 2004–05 Iran Pro League
- 2004–05 Iran Football's 2nd Division
