= Robert Markosi =

Iranian footballer

Robert Margousi
Personal information
- Full name: Robert Margousi
- Date of birth: 14 August 1976 (age 50)
- Place of birth: Iran
- Position: Forward

Team information
- Current team: Aluminium Arak
- Number: 16

Senior career*
Years	Team	Apps	(Gls)
- Ararat Tehran
2002–2006	Saba		(4)
2006–2007	Bargh Shiraz	27	(10)
2007–2008	Paykan	34	(1)
2008–	Aluminium Arak	?	(7)

International career^{‡}
2006	Iran	2	(0)
- * Club domestic league appearances and goals as of 18 May 2009 ‡ National team caps and goals as of October 2006

Robert Christopher Markosyan (Persian: روبرت ماركوسی, born 14 August 1976) is a retired Iranian football player.

== Club career ==
Having played for Saba Battery F.C. for a couple of seasons, in July 2006 he was transferred to Shirazi club Bargh, where he had a good season by scoring 10 goals in 27 appearances for the club. In August 2007 he joined Tehrani club Paykan, although he was linked with Pegah Gilan.

== International career ==
In October 2006, he was called up to join Team Melli for an LG cup tournament held in Jordan.
