= Siavash Akbarpour =

Iranian footballer (born 1985)

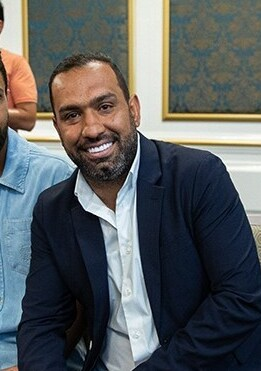
- Siavash Akbarpour in 2022.

Personal information
- Full name: Siavash Akbarpour
- Date of birth: January 21, 1985 (age 41)
- Place of birth: Shiraz, Iran
- Height: 1.81 m (5 ft 11 1/2 in)
- Positions: Attacking midfielder; second striker

Team information
- Current team: Shahrdari Bam

Youth career
- 2000–2001: Fajr Sepasi

Senior career*
Years	Team	Apps	(Gls)
2001–2004	Fajr Sepasi	55	(13)
2004–2007	Esteghlal	73	(23)
2007–2008	Al-Dhafra	11	(5)
2008–2010	Esteghlal	54	(14)
2010–2011	Steel Azin	25	(9)
2011–2012	Tractor Sazi	22	(1)
2012–2014	Esteghlal	51	(5)
2014–2015	Paykan	9	(0)

International career^{‡}
2001	Iran U17	3	(0)
2002–2003	Iran U23		
2006–2009	Iran	6	(0)

Managerial career
- 2016: Esteghlal U-17
- 2016–2019: Esteghlal (youth)
- 2019: Shahrdari Bam
- 2022–: Esteghlal (youth)
Medal record
Representing Iran
Asian Games
Gold medal – first place	2002 Busan	Team competition
- * Club domestic league appearances and goals as of January 17, 2014 ‡ National team caps and goals as of March 17, 2009

Siavash Akbarpour (Persian: سیاوش اکبرپور, born January 21, 1985, in Shiraz, Iran) is an Iranian former footballer and current coach.

== Club career ==
He started his professional career in Fajr Sepasi, and moved to Iranian giants Esteghlal in 2004, Where he made and excellent partnership with Reza Enayati in the front. He was one of the club's main players in its 2005–06 IPL championship. In July 2007 he moved to the UAE and joined Al-Dhafra. In 2008 transfer window he again joined Iranian giants Esteghlal again and won the league in his first season after many impressive matches. He signed a contract with Tractor Sazi on 18 June 2011. On 1 July 2012, he signed a two years contract with Esteghlal.

=== Club career statistics ===
Last Update 17 January 2014

Club performance			League		Cup		Continental		Total	
Season	Club	League	Apps	Goals	Apps	Goals	Apps	Goals	Apps	Goals
Iran			League		Hazfi Cup		Asia		Total	
2001–02	Fajr	Pro League	10	1	0	0	–	–	10	1
2002–03	Fajr	Pro League	22	5	1	0	–	–	23	5
2003–04	Fajr	Pro League	23	7	0	0	–	–	23	7
2004–05	Esteghlal	Pro League	24	7	0	0	–	–	24	7
2005–06	Esteghlal	Pro League	28	11	0	0	–	–	28	11
2006–07	Esteghlal	Pro League	21	5	0	0	–	–	21	5
United Arab Emirates			League		President's Cup		Asia		Total	
2007–08	Al Dhafra	UAE Football League	11	5	0	0	–	–	11	5
Iran			League		Hazfi Cup		Asia		Total	
2008–09	Esteghlal	Pro League	29	12	0	0	6	0	35	12
2009–10	Esteghlal	Pro League	25	2	2	3	7	1	34	6
2010–11	Steel Azin	Pro League	25	9	2	1	–	–	27	10
2011–12	Tractor Sazi	Pro League	22	1	1	0	–	–	23	1
2012–13	Esteghlal	Pro League	27	3	1	0	7	0	35	3
2013–14	Esteghlal	Pro League	24	2	4	0	4	0	32	2
2014–15	Peykan	Pro League	9	0	0	0	–	–	9	0
Total	Iran		289	65	11	4	24	1	324	70
Total	United Arab Emirates		11	5	0	0	0	0	11	5
Career total			300	70	11	4	24	1	335	75

- Assist Goals

Season	Team	Assists
05–06	Esteghlal	3
06–07	Esteghlal	3
08–09	Esteghlal	5
09–10	Esteghlal	4
10–11	Steel Azin	1
11–12	Tractor Sazi	3
12–13	Esteghlal	1

== International career ==
=== Under-23 national team ===
He is a technically sound player who was first called up to the Iran national under-23 football team in the 2002 Asian Games, although because of his lack of experience he was ineffective. He was also part of the Iranian squad in Athens 2004 Olympics unsuccessful qualification campaign. Where he was kicked out of the camp when Mohammad Mayeli Kohan was the head coach because of discipline problems and returned after he left the job and called up again by Hossein Faraki.

=== Senior national team ===
After his role in Esteghlal's league championship, his former coach, Amir Ghalenoei, called Akbarpour to the senior Iran national football team. He made his debut in the 2007 Asian Cup qualification match against Chinese Taipei in February 2006. His next cap was against UAE in which he assisted his former teammate Reza Enayati's goal. He returned to Team Melli in 2009 under Ali Daei and played few minutes again South Korea in February 2009 where the match finished 1–1 in Tehran.

== Beyond football ==
=== Personal life ===
In 2005, Siavash Akbarpour married Soudabeh Tarzi, a former lawyer in city of Tehran. They have two daughters. Their first daughter was born in 2006 her name in Sarina, in Tehran. In 2010 their second daughter Selina was born. They divorced in 2014. Siavash Akbarpour was engaged after few months of dating in 2016. During an interview Akbarpour said, "We're two people who are really happy and in love."

== Honours ==
Esteghlal

- Iran Pro League (3): 2005–06, 2008–09, 2012–13
