= Meisam Baou =

Iranian footballer

Maysam Baou
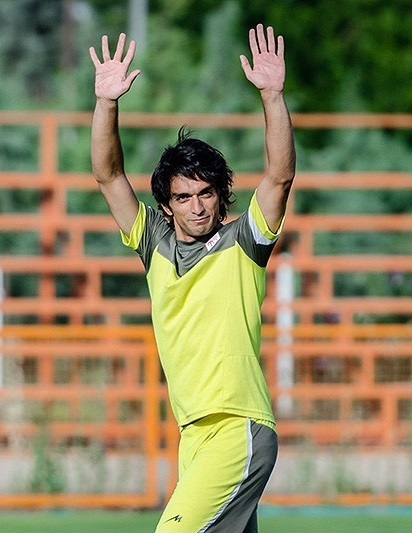

Personal information
- Full name: Meisam Baeoudizabadi
- Date of birth: 19 September 1983 (age 43)
- Place of birth: Qaemshahr, Iran
- Position: Attacking midfielder

Youth career
- Dehdari Ghaemshahr
- Shamushack

Senior career*
Years	Team	Apps	(Gls)
2001–2004	Shamushack		
2004–2007	Esteghlal	37	(7)
2007–2008	Al-Shaab	11	(2)
2008	Rah Ahan	13	(1)
2008–2009	Aboomoslem	33	(11)
2009–2010	Persepolis	25	(3)
2010–2012	Shahrdari Tabriz	38	(11)
2012–2013	Esteghlal	18	(1)
2013–2014	Tractor Sazi	17	(0)
2014–2015	Esteghlal Khuzestan	17	(1)
2015–2017	Nassaji Mazandaran	11	(0)

International career^{‡}
2007–2010	Iran	6	(0)
- * Club domestic league appearances and goals as of 27 November 2014 ‡ National team caps and goals as of 17 July 2011

Meisam Baeoudizabadi (Persian: میثم بائو دیز آبادی, born 19 September 1983) is a retired Iranian football player.

== Club career ==
He started to shine when Shamushak was promoted to Persian Gulf Cup in 2003–04 season and moved to Esteghlal where he stayed for three seasons and became known after Tehran derby in 2004–05 season. He had an unsuccessful in UAE where he moved back to Iran and Rah Ahan halfway through. He moved to Aboomoslem the season after. He moved to Persepolis in summer 2009 and spending one season in Persepolis. In 2010, he moved to Shahrdari Tabriz and was one of the key players of the team in two seasons. After Shahrdari's relegation to the Azadegan League, Baou signed a three years contract with his former team, Esteghlal. He played for Esteghlal one season but he left the team after end of the season and joined to Tractor Sazi.

== International career ==
He started his international career in WAFF 2007. He was called up again for Team Melli under Ali Daei in December 2008.

== Honours ==
=== Club ===
Esteghlal

- Iran Pro League (2): 2005–06, 2012–13

Persepolis

- Hazfi Cup (1): 2009–10

Tractor Sazi

- Hazfi Cup (1): 2013–14

=== Country ===
- WAFF Championship (1): 2007
