= Pirouz Ghorbani =

Iranian footballer (born 1979)

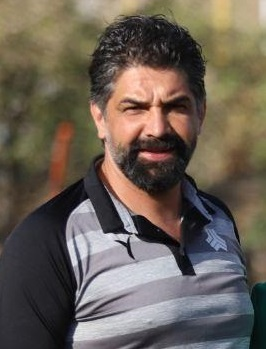
- Ghorbani in 2020

Personal information
- Date of birth: 2 March 1979 (age 47)
- Place of birth: Tehran, Iran
- Height: 1.87 m (6 ft 2 in)
- Position: Defender

Team information
- Current team: Aluminium Arak (Head-coach)

Youth career
- 1997–2000: Esteghlal

Senior career*
| Years | Team | Apps | (Gls) |
| 2000–2009 | Esteghlal | 219 | (12) |
| 2009–2011 | Mes Kerman | 66 | (2) |
| 2011–2012 | Saipa | 32 | (0) |
| 2012–2014 | Rah Ahan | 55 | (2) |
| 2014–2015 | Saba Qom | 24 | (2) |

International career
| 2007–2011 | Iran | 6 | (0) |

Managerial career
- 2015–2016: Rah Ahan (assistant)
- 2016–2018: Sardar Bukan
- 2019–2020: Sardar Bukan
- 2020–2021: Saipa (assistant)
- 2021: Rayka
- 2022: Rayka
- 2022–2023: Shahrdari Astara
- 2023–2024: Naft & Gaz Gachsaran
- 2024–2026: Fajr Sepasi
- 2026–: Aluminium Arak
- * Club domestic league appearances and goals

Pirouz Ghorbani (Persian: پیروز قربانی; born 2 March 1979) is an Iranian football coach and a former defender who is the manager of Aluminium Arak.

== Club career ==
Pirouz Ghorbani played for Esteghlal F.C. since he was 16 alongside teammates Amir Hossein Sadeqi and Vahid Talebloo.

=== Club career statistics ===
As of 19 March 2015

| Club performance | | | League | | Cup | | Continental | | Total | | |
| Season | Club | League | Apps | Goals | Apps | Goals | Apps | Goals | Apps | Goals | |
| Iran | | | League | | Hazfi Cup | | Asia | | | | Total |
|---|---|---|---|---|---|---|---|---|---|---|---|
| 2003–04 | Esteghlal | Pro League | 15 | 0 | 0 | 0 | - | - | 10 | 0 | |
| 2004–05 | Esteghlal | Pro League | 30 | 2 | 1 | 0 | - | - | 29 | 5 | |
| 2005–06 | Esteghlal | Pro League | 30 | 0 | 0 | 0 | - | - | 26 | 5 | |
| 2006–07 | Esteghlal | Pro League | 28 | 4 | 0 | 0 | - | - | 27 | 5 | |
| 2007–08 | Esteghlal | Pro League | 28 | 2 | 2 | 0 | - | - | 28 | 4 | |
| 2008–09 | Esteghlal | Pro League | 32 | 5 | 2 | 0 | 5 | 0 | 38 | 5 | |
| 2009–10 | Mes | Pro League | 32 | 2 | 1 | 0 | 7 | 0 | 41 | 2 | |
| 2010–11 | Mes | Pro League | 32 | 0 | 1 | 0 | - | - | 34 | 0 | |
| 2011–12 | Saipa | Pro League | 32 | 0 | 0 | 0 | - | - | 32 | 0 | |
| 2012–13 | Rah Ahan | Pro League | 32 | 1 | 1 | 0 | - | - | 32 | 0 | |
| 2013–14 | Rah Ahan | Pro League | 23 | 1 | 2 | 0 | - | - | 23 | 1 | |
| 2014–15 | Saba Qom | Pro League | 24 | 0 | 0 | 0 | - | - | 24 | 0 | |
| Career total | | | 368 | 16 | 10 | 0 | 13 | 0 | 368 | 18 | |

- Assist Goals

| Season | Team | Assists |
|---|---|---|
| 07/08 | Esteghlal | 4 |
| 08/09 | Esteghlal | 2 |
| 10/11 | Mes | 1 |
| 11/12 | Saipa | 3 |

== International career ==
He made his debut for the Iran national football team in a friendly match against UAE in January 2007. After the injury of Hadi Aghili in 2008 he was called up again against UAE and played the match.

== Managerial Statistics ==
As of 30 April 2025

Managerial record by team and tenure
| Team | From | To | Record | | | | |
| Team | From | To | P | W | D | L | Win % |
|---|---|---|---|---|---|---|---|
| Sardar Bukan | 1 July 2016 | 23 October 2018 | 29 | 8 | 12 | 9 | 27.59 |
| Sardar Bukan | 8 August 2019 | 25 February 2020 | 15 | 5 | 6 | 4 | 33.33 |
| Rayka | 18 June 2021 | 29 December 2021 | 18 | 7 | 5 | 6 | 38.89 |
| Rayka | 12 February 2022 | 30 June 2022 | 13 | 4 | 5 | 4 | 30.77 |
| Shahrdari Astara | 4 July 2022 | 7 February 2023 | 21 | 3 | 10 | 8 | 14.29 |
| Naft Gachsaran | 9 July 2023 | 12 June 2024 | 36 | 11 | 13 | 12 | 30.56 |
| Fajr Sepasi | 1 July 2024 | Present | 32 | 18 | 9 | 5 | 56.25 |
| Total | | | 164 | 56 | 60 | 48 | 34.15 |

== Honours ==
=== Player ===
- Iran's Premier Football League
  - Winner: 2
    - 2005/06 with Esteghlal
    - 2008/09 with Esteghlal
  - Runner up: 1
    - 2003/04 with Esteghlal
- Hazfi Cup
  - Winners:1
    - 2008 with Esteghlal
  - Runner up: 1
    - 2004 with Esteghlal

=== Manager ===
Fajr Sepasi

- Azadegan League: 2024–25
