= Akvsenti Gilauri =

Georgian footballer

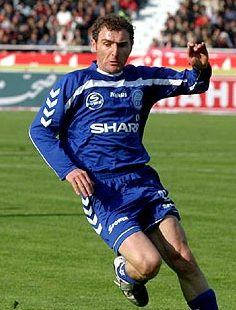

Personal information
- Full name: Akvsenti Gilauri
- Date of birth: 6 August 1979 (age 47)
- Place of birth: Tbilisi, Georgia
- Height: 1.78 m (5 ft 10 in)
- Position: Defender

Youth career
- –2000: Locomotive Tbilisi

Senior career*
Years	Team	Apps	(Gls)
2000–2003	Lokomotivi Tbilisi	63	(0)
2003	Dila Gori	40	(8)
2003–2004	Sioni Bolnisi	17	(6)
2004–2007	Esteghlal	44	(2)
2007–2008	Pegah Gilan	25	(0)
2008–2009	Spartaki Tskhinvali	14	(1)
2009–2010	Olimpi Rustavi	24	(6)
Total		217	(23)

International career
2000–2001	Georgia U21		
- * Club domestic league appearances and goals

Akvsenti Gilauri (Georgian: აქვსენთი გილაური; born 6 August 1979) is a Georgian football defender.

Gilauri played for FC Lokomotivi Tbilisi in the 2001/02 Georgian Cup final, where the club lost on penalties.
