= Farzad Majidi =

Iranian footballer

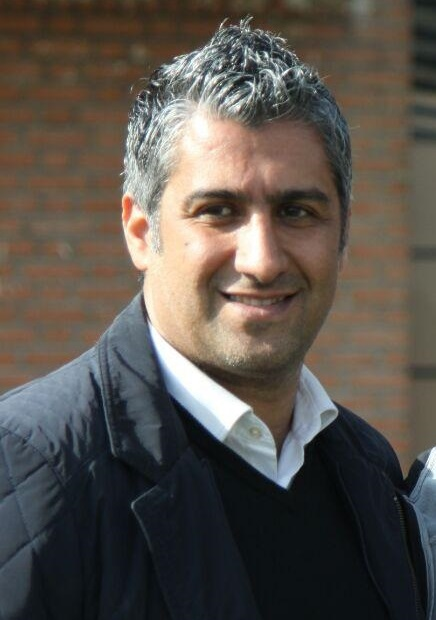

Personal information
- Full name: Farzad Majidi
- Date of birth: September 9, 1977 (age 49)
- Place of birth: Tehran, Iran
- Height: 1.80 m (5 ft 11 in)
- Position: Midfielder

Senior career*
Years	Team	Apps	(Gls)
1996–1997	Payam Khorasan		
2000–2007	Esteghlal Tehran		
2007–2008	Steel Azin Tehran		
2008-2009	PAS Hamedan		
2010–2011	Gostaresh Tabriz		

International career^{‡}
2004–2006	Iran	2	(0)
- * Club domestic league appearances and goals as of 10 October 2009 ‡ National team caps and goals as of 16 February 2007

Farzad Majidi (Persian: فرزاد مجیدی, born September 9, 1977, in Tehran, Iran) is a former Iranian football player. He usually played in the midfield position. He is the younger brother of fellow footballer Farhad Majidi.

== Club career ==
Season	Team	Country	Division	Apps	Goals	Assists
01/02	Esteghlal	Iran	1	?	3	?
02/03	Esteghlal	Iran	1	?	2	?
03/04	Esteghlal	Iran	1	?	6	?
04/05	Esteghlal	Iran	1	27	3	?
05/06	Esteghlal	Iran	1	21	0	2
06/07	Esteghlal	Iran	1	14	1	1
07/08	Steel Azin	Iran	1	?	2	?
10/11	Gostaresh Foolad	Iran	2	0	0	0

== Honors ==
Esteghlal:

- Iran's Premier Football League Winner:1
  - 2005/06
