= Mohammad Navazi =

Iranian footballer

Mohamad Navazi
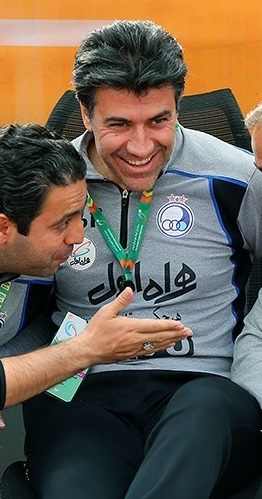

Personal information
- Full name: Mohamad Navazi
- Date of birth: September 5, 1974 (age 52)
- Place of birth: Kivaj, Sarab County, Iran
- Height: 1.78 m (5 ft 10 in)
- Position: Right midfielder

Team information
- Current team: Esteghlal (assistant manager)

Youth career
- 1991–1992: Esteghlal
- 1992–1994: Bank Melli
- 1994–1995: Fajr Sepah Tehran

Senior career*
Years	Team	Apps	(Gls)
1995–1997	Bahman		
1997–2004	Esteghlal		
2004–2006	Saba Battery	43	(3)
2006–2008	Esteghlal	35	(2)
2008–2009	Aluminium Arak		
2009–2010	Nassaji		
2010–2012	Shahrdari Yasuj		
2012–2013	Shahrdari Arak	10	(2)

International career
1997–2002	Iran	19	(1)
2005	Iran B	6	(2)

Managerial career
- 2013: Shahrdari Arak
- 2015–2016: Esteghlal (assistant)
- 2017–2018: Esteghlal B
- 2018–2019: Iranjavan
- 2020: Shahr Khodro (assistant)
- 2021–2023: Aluminium Arak (assistant)
- 2023–: Esteghlal (assistant)
- 2025: Esteghlal (caretaker)
Medal record
Representing Iran
Asian Games
Gold medal – first place	1998 Bangkok	Team competition
- * Club domestic league appearances and goals as of 13 May 2019

Mohamad Navazi (Persian: محمد نوازی, born September 5, 1974) is a retired Iranian football player who mostly played for Esteghlal Tehran, He usually played as a right midfielder.

In the Tehran derby played in 2000, he fought with Hamid Estili at the end of the match and was arrested by police. They were imprisoned in Qasr Prison for 3 days. He was suspended for the rest of season. Navazi played for Saba Battery F.C. in the 2006 AFC Champions League group stage. He moved back to Esteghlal in 2006 and played there for two seasons.

In January 2013, he became head coach of Azadegan League side Shahrdari Arak.

== Club career statistics ==
Club performance			League	
Season	Club	League	Apps	Goals
Iran			League	
2004–05	Saba Battery	Pro League	19	2
2005–06	Saba Battery	Pro League	24	1
2006–07	Esteghlal	Pro League	14	1
2007–08	Esteghlal	Pro League	21	1
2008–09	Aluminium Arak	Division 1		7
2009–10	Nassaji	Division 1		1
2010–11	Shahrdari Yasuj	Division 1	10	2
Career total				15

== Honours ==
Esteghlal

- Azadegan League Winner: 1
  - 2000–01
- Hazfi Cup Winner: 2
  - 2000, 2002

Saba

- Hazfi Cup Winner: 1
  - 2005
- Iranian Super Cup Winner: 1
  - 2005
