= Ali Samereh =

Iranian association football player

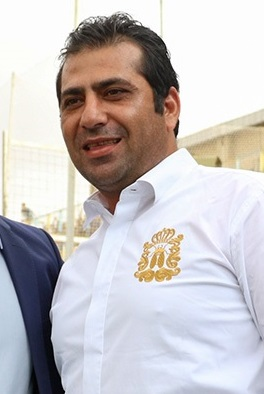

Personal information
- Full name: Ali Samereh
- Date of birth: November 23, 1977 (age 48)
- Place of birth: Rafsanjan, Iran
- Position: Striker

Team information
- Current team: Esteghlal (team manager)

Youth career
- 1993–1996: Mes Rafsanjan

Senior career*
Years	Team	Apps	(Gls)
1996–1999	Shahrdari Kerman	33	(3)
1999–2000	Fajr Sepasi	14	(9)
2000–2005	Esteghlal	103	(32)
2001–2002	→ Perugia Calcio (loan)	6	(0)
2005–2008	Al-Shaab	78	(55)
2008–2009	Ajman Club	16	(4)
2009–2010	Mes Kerman	20	(5)
2010–2011	Pas Hamedan	10	(0)
2011–2012	Mes Sarcheshmeh	21	(3)
2012–2014	Mes Rafsanjan	28	(5)

International career
2002–2007	Iran	25	(2)

Managerial career
- 2016–2017: Kian Bakhtiari Zagros
- 2017–2018: Mes Rafsanjan
- 2023–: Esteghlal (Team manager)
- * Club domestic league appearances and goals

Ali Samereh (Persian: علی سامره; born November 23, 1977) is an Iranian football coach and former player. He played for Iranian clubs Fajr Sepasi, Esteghlal and Mes Kerman, for Italian side Perugia, and for UAE clubs Al-Shaab and Ajman. He usually played as a striker.

== Club career ==
Samereh began his career at Iranian Premier League outfit F.C. Fajr Sepasi and soon showed what he is capable of, this earned him a move to the Iranian giants Esteghlal F.C. He continued his first-rate performance with Esteghlal F.C. and was instrumental in the glory of the club. They took the opportunity and sent him on loan to Perugia Calcio, a Serie A Italian club for a fee of £166,000. Samereh's success with Perugia Calcio was very limited due to only two handfuls of appearances with the club and he soon returned to Esteghlal FC.

In 2005, he moved to the UAE to play for Al-Shaab. During the first season, Ali Samereh scored 17 goals for the club in the UAE League, becoming the league's third top goalscorer in the 2005/06 season. He continued his impressive performances for his club, scoring another 17 goals in the 2006/07 league season and becoming the second top scorer.

Samereh, UAE League's top goal scorer extended his contract at Al-Shaab for another year in a $700,000 contract.

He moved back to Iran in May 2009 and sign one-year contract with Mes Kerman, He scored important goals for Mes at 2010 AFC Champions League.

== Career statistics ==
As of 19 May 2019

Club	Division	Season	League		Cup		Continental		Total	
Club	Division	Season	Apps	Goals	Apps	Goals	Apps	Goals	Apps	Goals
Fajr Sepasi	Azadegan League	1999–00		9			–			
Esteghlal	Azadegan League	2000–01		13						
Perugia	Serie A	2001–02	6	0	1	0	–		7	0
Esteghlal	Persian Gulf Pro League	2002–03		6						
Esteghlal	Persian Gulf Pro League	2003–04		7			–			
Esteghlal	Persian Gulf Pro League	2004–05	12	6			–			
Esteghlal	Total			19						
Al-Shaab	UAE Pro-League	2004–05		9			–			
Al-Shaab	UAE Pro-League	2005–06		17			–			
Al-Shaab	UAE Pro-League	2006–07		17			–			
Al-Shaab	UAE Pro-League	2007–08		12			–			
Al-Shaab	Total			55			–			
Ajman Club	UAE Pro-League	2008–09		4			–			
Mes Kerman	Persian Gulf Pro League	2009–10	20	5			7	3		
Pas Hamedan	Persian Gulf Pro League	2010–11	10	0			–			
Mes Sarcheshmeh	Persian Gulf Pro League	2011–12	21	3			–			
Mes Rafsanjan	Azadegan League	2012–13	23	5			–			
Mes Rafsanjan	Azadegan League	2013–14	5	0			–			
Mes Rafsanjan	Total		28	5			–			
Career total				116						

Scores and results list Iran's goal tally first, score column indicates score after each Samereh goal.

List of international goals scored by Ali Samereh
No.	Date	Venue	Opponent	Score	Result	Competition
1	26 May 2000	King Abdullah II Stadium, Amman, Jordan	Palestine	1–0	1–1	2000 WAFF Championship
2	4 February 2003	Hong Kong Stadium, Hong Kong	Uruguay	1–0	1–1 (2–4 p)	2003 Lunar New Year Cup

== International career ==
He was called up for the national team in 2002, and made several appearances, however he could not repeat his goal scoring feat at the national level. After a period away from football due to injury, Samereh soon bounced back and continued his scoring for Esteghlal F.C. in the 2003/04 season and was recalled to the Iran national football team.

He was a couple of years away from Team Melli despite his goalscoring record in the UAE League. In January 2007 he was once again called up to the national team for a friendly tournament in the UAE, where he has been playing for Al-Shaab since 2005, though he did not join the squad.

In January 2008 he once again joined the Iranian squad for the 2010 FIFA World Cup qualification campaign, appearing for Iran in a warm-up friendly match against Qatar. With Vahid Hashemian not participating in the third stage of the qualification, Samereh was expected to play an important role in this campaign.

Afhsin Ghotbi recalled the striker for the FIFA World Cup qualifying campaign against South Korea.

== Managerial career ==
Samereh was manager of Mes Rafsanjan until his dismissal in September 2018.
