= Sebo Shahbazian =

Iranian footballer

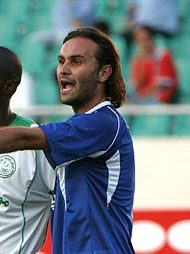

Personal information
- Full name: Sebo Shahbazian
- Date of birth: September 25, 1980 (age 46)
- Place of birth: Urmia, Iran
- Position: Defender

Senior career*
Years	Team	Apps	(Gls)
–2000	Ararat		
2000–2003	Pas Tehran		
2003–2006	Esteghlal		
2006–2007	Saba	0	(0)

Managerial career
- 2022–: Esteghlal U-16
- * Club domestic league appearances and goals

Sebo Shahbazian (born September 25, 1980) is a retired Iranian football player who usually played as a defender. He played for the IPL club Saba Battery FC during the 2006–2007 season.

== Club career ==
Shahbazian started his career at the Tehran side Pas Tehran before moving to Iranian Giants Esteghlal FC. In 2006 Shahbazian was transferred to Saba Battery FC.
