= Hossein Gharib =

Iranian physician

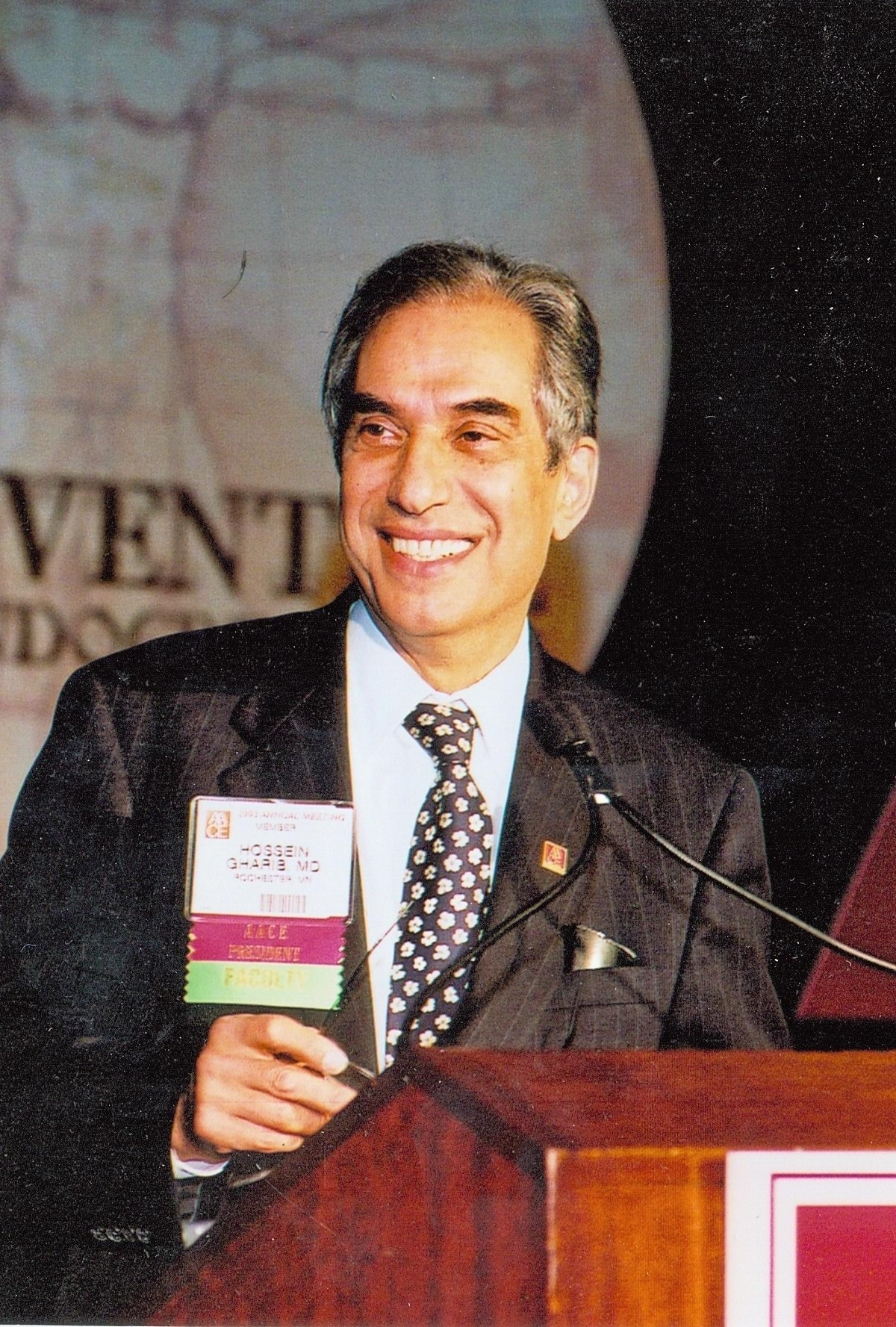
Dr. Hossein Gharib

Dr. Hossein Gharib (Persian: حسین قریب; born February 2, 1940 in Tehran, Iran) is an Iranian physician who specializes in thyroid disorders. He is a consulting physician at the Mayo Clinic in Rochester, Minnesota.

== Early life ==
Gharib grew up in Tehran, the son of Dr. Mohammad Gharib (1909–1975), a former professor and chair of pediatrics at Tehran University (1938–1975), and Zahra Gharib (1915–2010), daughter of Ostad Abdolazim Gharib (1877–1965), a professor of Persian literature. Both his father, Mohammad Gharib, and his grandfather, Abdolazim Gharib, were honored by postage stamps issued by the government of Iran. Gharib has two sisters, Nahid Ziai, of McLean, VA and Mayram Comninos, of Paris, France and one brother, Dr. Mohsen Gharib, of Bethesda, MD.

Gharib attended Ferdowsi Grade School (1946–1952) and later Alborz High School (1952–1958), graduating with honors in 1958. He traveled to the United States to study medicine. He received a B.S. degree from the Ohio State University in 1962. He went on to receive a medical degree from the University of Michigan Medical School in 1966, and took his internship at Philadelphia General Hospital from 1966 to 1967. He completed an internal medicine residency (1967–1969) and fellowship in endocrinology and metabolism (1969–1971) at the Mayo Clinic in Rochester, Minnesota. After a visiting fellowship in reproductive endocrinology at the Columbia University College of Physicians & Surgeons in New York City, he joined the Mayo Clinic faculty in Rochester in 1972.

== Professional career ==
In 1974, he returned briefly to Iran, where he was initially Director of Research Laboratory at the Queen Heart Hospital before being appointed medical director of the Reza Pahlavi Medical Center (1975–1977), a 250-bed, modern hospital in Northern Tehran. Reza Pahlavi Hospital was part of the Imperial Social Services Organization (Sazeman-e Shahanshahi Khadamat-e Ejtemaee). Gharib later became the associate dean of the College of Health Sciences (1977) and served as the Professor and Director of the Department of Internal Medicine at Saadat-Abad Medical Center, National University (1977–1979). In June 1979, he returned to the Mayo Clinic in Rochester to become professor of medicine at the Mayo Clinic College of Medicine, and a consultant in the Division of Endocrinology, Metabolism, and Nutrition. He also teaches and conducts clinical research.

Research

In 1971, Gharib and his colleagues developed the first radioimmunoassay (RIA) to measure triiodothyronine (T3) in human serum. Published in the Journal of Clinical Endocrinology & Metabolism (JCEM) between 1970 and 1971, his initial observations hold true today. This was a major development that allowed further extensive studies on the mechanisms of thyroid hormones physiology and metabolism.

In the 1980s, Gharib focused his attention on nodular thyroid disease (NTD) and thyroid cancer, making a number of important contributions to thyroid practice. For example, an early paper emphasized the importance of NTD in clinical practice (New England Journal of Medicine, 1985); several studies illustrated the technique, accuracy, and impact of thyroid fine-needle aspiration (FNA) biopsy in the management of nodules (Acta Cytol, 1987; Annals of Internal Medicine, 1993); and defined the limitations of FNA (Annals, 1984). He gets credit for helping establish the accuracy and safety of thyroid FNA biopsy in the management of thyroid nodular disease. His seminal study published in NEJM in 1987 was a landmark report that challenged the conventional wisdom that long-term thyroid hormone therapy shrinks thyroid nodules. This report initially sparked considerable controversy but, when confirmed by others, eventually changed medical practice and thyroid hormones are no longer used to suppress benign nodular goiters (Annals 1998; Endocrinology & Metabolism Clinics of North America 2007). He was one of the first to draw attention to the high prevalence of the incidentally discovered thyroid nodules, "thyroid incidentalomas", and described steps in diagnosis and challenges in their management (Arch Int Med, 1995; Annals Internal Med, 1997; Endocrinology & Metabolism Clinics of North America, 2000).

Publications, Lectures and Memberships

Gharib co-edited the first evidence-based endocrinology textbook, originally published in 2003, with the fourth edition printed in 2020. In 2013, he and three colleagues edited and published the textbook Endocrinology: A Problem-Oriented Approach. In 2017 he published the book Thyroid Nodule. Other published works include more than 120 peer-reviewed original papers, 50 review articles and 30 textbook chapters. He travels worldwide to teach and lecture, and by 2020 he had lectured at 350 endocrine events in more than 35 countries. He takes pride in regularly visiting his home country, Iran, to teach and educate.

He is a member of the American Medical Association (AMA), Minnesota Medical Association (MMA), AACE, Endocrine Society, American College of Physicians (ACP), and the American Thyroid Association (ATA). He was a member of the MMA Committee on CME (2007–2010) and chaired that committee from 2006 to 2009. He has served on numerous ATA committees, including Awards, Development, Membership, Patient Education & Advocacy, and Public Health.

He has served on the editorial boards of Acta Endocrinologia (Romania); Endocrinology News; JCEM; Endocrine Practice; International Journal of Endocrinology; U.S. Endocrinology; Portuguese Journal of Endocrinology; Diabetes & Metabolism; and Thyroid. He has served as the Dean of Endocrine University (EU) since 2004.

He was elected a Master of the American College of Endocrinology in 2004 and a Master of the American College of Physicians in 2006 He has held leadership positions with the American Association of Clinical Endocrinologists (AACE), serving as president in 2002. In 2008 he became president of the American College of Endocrinology, which announced in 2012 a campaign to fund the Hossein Gharib (MD) Educational Fund, "in honor of Hossein Gharib, MD, MACE in recognition of his outstanding contributions to clinical endocrinology."

He became president of the American Thyroid Association at the ATA annual meeting in San Juan, Puerto Rico, in October 2013. The American College of Endocrinology awarded him its Yank D. Coble Jr, MD, Distinguished Service Award during the College Convocation on May 17, 2014, in Las Vegas.

In September 2015, Gharib received an honorary doctorate degree from Carol Davila University of Medicine & Pharmacy in Bucharest, Romania, for his "academic, scientific and human merits." He received the H. Jack Baskin, MD, Endocrine Teaching Award from AACE in May 2018, in Boston, Massachusetts.

In April 2021, he published his second book on Dr Mohammad Gharib, entitled "Mohammad Gharib, M.D.: His Inspiring Life & Legacy."

== Personal life ==
In 1976, Hossein married Minoo (Zahra) Jalili, an elementary school teacher from Yazd in Tehran. Minoo's mother was Fatemeh Ezzat Khatibi Nouri and her father, Seyyed Mahmoud Jalili, was a prominent, well-respected Iranian politician, and later served as a Senator from Yazd. Minoo and Hossein and their three children, Mohammad Hossein, Yasamin and Mahmood have lived in Rochester, Minnesota, since 1979. They have four grandchildren: Amir, Zara, Aria & Cyrus. Minoo died of breast cancer at age 58 and was interred on February 2, 2005 at Rochester's Oakwood Cemetery.

== Accolades ==
- Outstanding Medical Resident, Mayo Graduate School of Medicine, Rochester, MN (1968)
- Fellow, American College of Physicians (1975)
- Professor of Medicine at the Mayo Clinic College of Medicine (1994–present)
- Honorary Member, Iranian Academy of Medical Sciences (1995–present)
- Recipient of the Paul Starr Award, American Thyroid Association (2002)
- President, American Association of Clinical Endocrinologists (2002–2003)
- Recipient of the Mayo Clinic Department of Internal Medicine Laureate Award (2004)
- Master of American College of Endocrinology (MACE)(2004)
- Master of American College of Physicians (MACP)(2006)
- Recipient of the International Clinician Award of the Associazione Medici Endocrinologi (AME) in Italy (2006)
- President, American College of Endocrinology (2008–2009)
- Honorary Professor, Tehran University of Medical Sciences (2008)
- Recipient of the Distinction Award by Sociedade Brasileira de Endocrinologia e Metabologia (SBEM) in Brazil for “significant contributions to clinical endocrinology”(2009)
- Recipient of the Distinguished Physician Award of the Endocrine Society (2010)
- Recipient of Dr Augusto D Litonjua Distinguished Clinician Award of the Philippines-AACE Chapter (2012)
- Ellis Island Medal of Honor Award, NYC (2013)
- President, American Thyroid Association (2014)
- Yank D. Coble Jr., MD, Distinguished Service Award, American College of Endocrinology, (2014)
- Doctor Honoris Causa (Honorary Doctorate), "Carol Davila" University of Medicine and Pharmacy, Bucharest, Romania (2015)
- H Jack Baskin, MD, Endocrine Teaching Award, AACE, Boston, MA (2018)

== Television series ==
Roozegar-e Gharib (loosely translated to "The Era of Gharib") is a 36-part Iranian television series based on the life of Dr. Mohammad Gharib first shown in 2007. Hossein, his siblings, and other members of the Gharib family are also portrayed in the film by Iranian actors.
