= Amir Hossein Sadeghi =

Iranian footballer (born 1981)

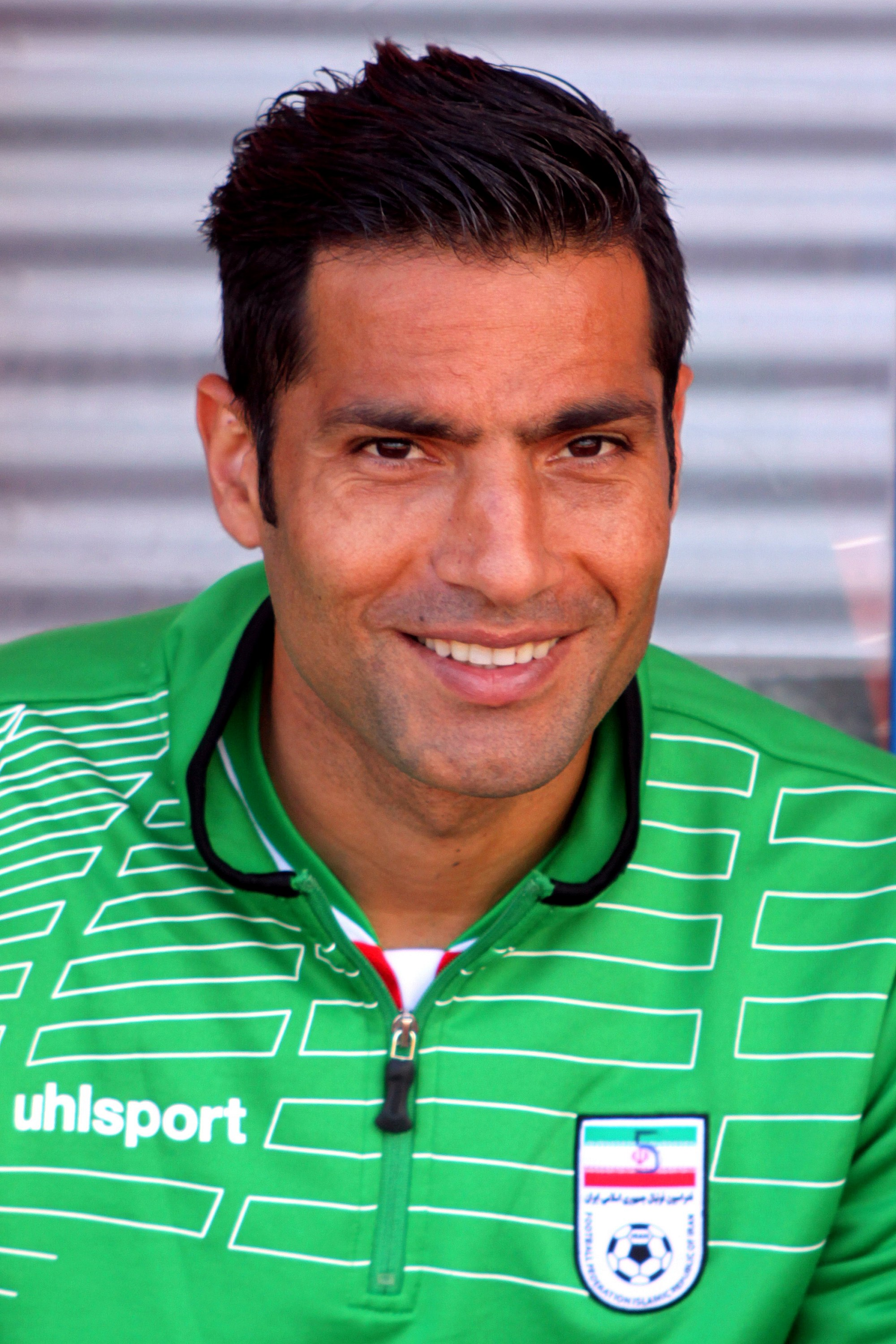
- Sadeghi with Iran in 2014

Personal information
- Full name: Amir Hossein Sadeghi
- Date of birth: 6 September 1981 (age 45)
- Place of birth: Tehran, Iran
- Height: 1.88 m (6 ft 2 in)
- Position: Defender

Youth career
- 1995–1999: Shahin
- 1999–2001: Moghvemat Tehran
- 2001–2003: Esteghlal

Senior career*
Years	Team	Apps	(Gls)
2000–2008	Esteghlal	107	(7)
2008–2009	Mes Kerman	30	(1)
2009–2011	Esteghlal	46	(4)
2011–2012	Tractor	31	(2)
2012–2015	Esteghlal	60	(2)
2015–2016	Saba Qom	28	(2)
2016–2018	Paykan	48	(2)

International career^{‡}
2003–2006	Iran U23	6	(0)
2005–2015	Iran	22	(1)
- * Club domestic league appearances and goals as of 20:52, 20 September 2016 (UTC) ‡ National team caps and goals as of 18:10, 31 March 2015 (UTC)

Amir Hossein Sadeghi (Persian: امیرحسین صادقی, born September 6, 1981) is an Iranian former football player who played in the Iran's Premier Football League throughout his career. He played as a defender, usually as a centre-back.

== Club career ==
=== Esteghlal ===
He is one of the youth products of Esteghlal. He was called up to the senior team in 2003. After five years with Esteghlal and 113 league appearances he left and signed a one-year contract with Mes in 2008.

=== Mes Kerman ===
After one season with Mes in which he made 30 appearances, Sadeghi signed a two-year contract with Esteghlal.

=== Tractor ===
Sadeghi again left Esteghlal in 2011 and signed with Tractor. He played an important role in helping Tractor finish as runners-up in the Iran Pro League. In his only season with Tractor, Sadeghi made 31 appearances, scoring twice.

=== Return to Esteghlal ===
He moved back to Esteghlal from Tractor in July 2012. In his first season back with Esteghlal, Sadeghi won the Iran Pro League title for the second time in his career. On 13 July 2014, Sadeghi agreed to a new two-year contract with Esteghlal, keeping him until 2016.

=== Saba Qom ===
On 26 July 2015, he terminated his contract with Esteghlal and joined Saba Qom on a one-year contract.

=== Peykan ===
In July 2016, after a season with Saba Qom and relegation to Azadegan League, Sadeghi decided to join Peykan on a two-year contract.

=== Club career statistics ===
As of 27 December 2017

Club performance			League		Cup		Continental		Total	
Season	Club	League	Apps	Goals	Apps	Goals	Apps	Goals	Apps	Goals
Iran			League		Hazfi Cup		Asia		Total	
2003–04	Esteghlal	Iran Pro League	15	1	^{1}	0	–	–	15^{1}	1
2004–05	Esteghlal	Iran Pro League	23	0	0	0	–	–	23	0
2005–06	Esteghlal	Iran Pro League	24	3	0	0	–	–	24	3
2006–07	Esteghlal	Iran Pro League	25	2	^{1}	^{1}	–	–	25^{1}	2^{1}
2007–08	Esteghlal	Iran Pro League	26	1	^{1}	0	–	–	26^{1}	1
2008–09	Mes	Iran Pro League	30	1	^{1}	^{1}	–	–	30^{1}	1^{1}
2009–10	Esteghlal	Iran Pro League	28	3	1	0	7	1	36	4
2010–11	Esteghlal	Iran Pro League	26	2	4	1	6	0	36	3
2011–12	Tractor	Iran Pro League	31	2	0	0	–	–	31	2
2012–13	Esteghlal	Iran Pro League	33	0	4	0	7	0	44	0
2013–14	Esteghlal	Iran Pro League	29	1	4	1	9	0	42	2
2014–15	Esteghlal	Iran Pro League	22	1	3	0	0	0	25	1
2015–16	Saba Qom	Iran Pro League	28	3	0	0	–	–	28	3
2016–17	Peykan	Iran Pro League	28	2	2	0	–	–	28	2
2017–18	Peykan	Iran Pro League	11	0	1	1	–	–	11	0
Career total			379	22	17^{1}	3^{1}	29	1	425	26

^{1} Statistics Incomplete.

- Assist Goals

Season	Team	Assists
06–07	Esteghlal	2
08–09	Mes	1
09–10	Esteghlal	1
10–11	Esteghlal	0
11–12	Tractor	0
12–13	Esteghlal	3
13–14	Esteghlal	1
14–15	Esteghlal	0

== International career ==
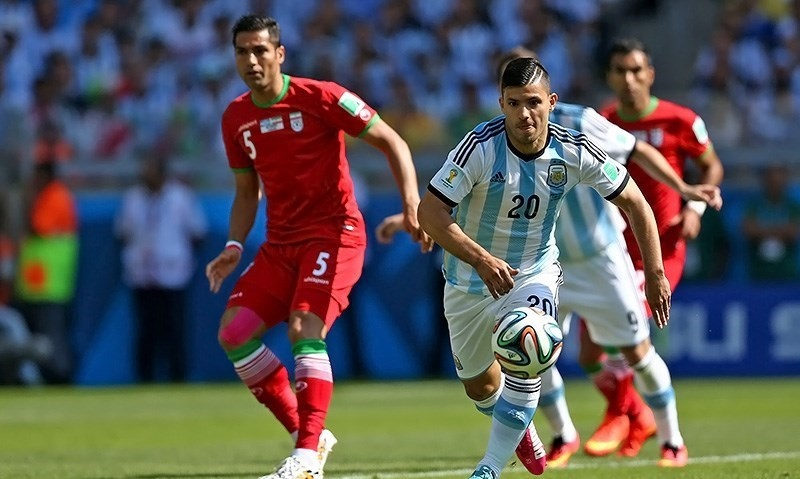
Sadeghi playing for Iran against Argentina national football team striker Sergio Agüero

He was named one of 23 members of Iranian national football team in 2006 World Cup in Germany. He became a regular player for the 2007 AFC Asian Cup qualification but could not play any match in the actual competition as there were few arguments and differences with the coach Amir Ghalenoei in Malaysia. He was called to Team Melli again for the 2010 World Cup qualification but never played any match and while Carlos Queiroz was in charge he was invited again for the last 3 matches of 2014 World Cup qualifications where Iran qualified for the tournament while Sadeghi played all the three games. He scored his first international goal on 19 November 2013 against Lebanon in the 2015 AFC Asian Cup qualification. On 1 June 2014, he was called into Iran's 2014 FIFA World Cup squad by Carlos Queiroz. He played the full 90 minutes in all three matches for Team Melli, and was one of Iran's key players in defense. He was called into Iran's 2015 AFC Asian Cup squad on 30 December 2014 by Carlos Queiroz.

=== International Goals ===
Scores and results list Iran's goal tally first.

#	Date	Venue	Opponent	Score	Result	Competition
1.	19 November 2013	Camille Chamoun Sports City Stadium, Beirut, Lebanon	Lebanon	1–0	4–1	2015 AFC Asian Cup qualification

== Honours ==
=== Club ===
Esteghlal

- Iran Pro League: 2003–04 (Runner-up), 2005–06, 2010–11 (Runner-up), 2012–13
- Hazfi Cup: 2003–04 (Runner-up), 2007–08

Tractor

- Iran Pro League: 2011–12 (Runner-up)

Sporting positions
Preceded by Mehdi Rahmati	Esteghlal Tehran FC captain 2014–2015	Succeeded by Reza Enayati
