= 2005–06 Iran Pro League =

5th season of Persian Gulf Pro League

Iran Pro League
- Season: 2005–06
- Champions: Esteghlal; 1st Pro League title 6th Iranian title
- Relegated: Shamoushak; Shahid Ghandi
- Champions League: Esteghlal; Sepahan (Hazfi Cup champions)
- Matches: 240
- Goals: 538 (2.24 per match)
- Top goalscorer: Reza Enayati (21 goals)
- Biggest home win: PAS Tehran 7–1 Foolad (4 March 2006)
- Biggest away win: Shahid Ghandi 1–5 Zob Ahan (29 October 2005)
- Highest scoring: PAS Tehran 7–1 Foolad (4 March 2006); PAS Tehran 4–4 Sepahan (31 March 2006)
- Longest winning run: 3 matches Aboumoslem; PAS Tehran
- Longest unbeaten run: 12 matches Esteghlal
- Longest winless run: 17 matches Shahid Ghandi
- Longest losing run: 5 matches Shahid Ghandi
- Highest attendance: 100,000; Esteghlal – Bargh Shiraz (21 April 2006)
- Lowest attendance: 0 (spectator ban); Malavan – Bargh Shiraz (2 September 2005); Aboumoslem – Shahid Ghandi (16 December 2005); Malavan – Fajr Sepasi (3 March 2006); Shamoushak – Malavan (4 April 2006); Shamoushak – Est. Ahvaz (16 April 2006)
- Total attendance: 2,157,000
- Average attendance: 9,179

The 2005–06 Iran Pro League was the 23rd season of Iran's Football League and fifth as Iran Pro League since its establishment in 2001. Foolad were the defending champions. The season featured 14 teams from the 2004–05 Iran Pro League and two new teams promoted from the 2004–05 Azadegan League: Shahid Ghandi as champions and Rah Ahan as runner-up. The league started on 2 September 2005 and ended on 21 April 2006. Esteghlal won the Pro League title for the first time in their history (total sixth Iranian title). A total of 240 matches in the Pro League yielded 538 goals during the season.

== Teams ==
Sixteen teams competed in the league – the top fourteen teams from the previous season and the two teams promoted from the Azadegan League. The promoted teams were Shahid Ghandi Yazd and Rah Ahan Tehran. They replaced Paykan and Pegah, who were relegated to the Azadegan League.

Team	Location	Stadium	Capacity
Aboomoslem	Mashhad	Samen Stadium	27,000
Esteghlal	Tehran	Azadi Stadium	95,225
Esteghlal Ahvaz	Ahvaz	Takhti Ahvaz	10,000
Fajr Sepasi Shiraz	Shiraz	Hafezieh Stadium	50,000
Foolad	Ahvaz	Takhti Ahvaz	30,655
Malavan	Bandar-e Anzali	Sirous Ghayeghran Stadium	15,559
PAS Tehran	Tehran	Shahid Dastgerdi Stadium	8,250
Persepolis	Tehran	Azadi Stadium	95,225
Rah Ahan Tehran	Tehran	Shahid Derakhshan Stadium	12,000
Saipa	Tehran	Shahid Shiroudi Stadium	25,000
Saba Battery	Sabashahr	Shahid Derakhshan Stadium	12,000
Sepahan	Isfahan	Naghsh-e Jahan Stadium	75,000
Shahid Ghandi Yazd	Yazd	Shahid Nassiri Stadium	15,000
Shamoushak Noshahr	Nowshahr	Shohada-ye Nowshahr Stadium	6,000
Zob Ahan Esfahan	Fuladshahr	Foolad Shahr Stadium	20,000

== Final classification ==
Pos	Team	Pld	W	D	L	GF	GA	GD	Pts	Qualification or relegation
1	Esteghlal (Note: AFC disqualified Esteghlal Tehran from Group B for failing to register their players in time.) (C)	30	16	11	3	44	17	+27	59	
2	PAS Tehran	30	16	10	4	54	29	+25	58	
3	Saipa	30	13	13	4	41	21	+20	52	
4	Saba	30	13	11	6	35	31	+4	50	
5	Aboumoslem	30	12	10	8	31	23	+8	46	
6	Zob Ahan	30	12	10	8	41	30	+11	45 (Note: Zob Ahan was deducted 1 point in issued by Iranian Football Federation.)	
7	Sepahan	30	12	7	11	38	32	+6	43	Qualification for the 2007 AFC Champions League (Note: As cup winner.)
8	Foolad	30	11	8	11	30	41	−11	41	
9	Fajr Sepasi	30	8	12	10	27	33	−6	36	
10	Malavan	30	10	6	14	29	38	−9	36	
11	Esteghlal Ahvaz	30	9	8	13	42	44	−2	35	
12	Rah Ahan	30	9	7	14	27	43	−16	34	
13	Persepolis	30	9	11	10	39	40	−1	32 (Note: Persepolis was deducted 6 points in issued by FIFA.)	
14	Bargh	30	6	10	14	23	37	−14	28	
15	Shamoushak (R)	30	4	11	15	19	39	−20	23	Relegation to the 2006–07 Azadegan League
16	Shahid Ghandi (R)	30	4	7	19	21	43	−22	19	Relegation to the 2006–07 Azadegan League

Updated to match(es) played on 01 SEP 2018. Source: IPL Stats, Soccerway
Rules for classification: 1) Points; 2) Goal difference; 3) Goals scored.
(C) Champions; (R) Relegated

== Results table ==
Home \ Away	EST	PAS	SAP	SAB	ABU	ZOB	SEP	FOL	PRS	FJR	MLV	ESA	RAH	BGH	SHM	GHA
Esteghlal		0–0	0–0	4–1	0–0	3–0	2–1	4–1	1–0	0–0	3–3	1–0	3–0	4–1	1–1	1–0
PAS Tehran	1–0		1–1	0–0	2–0	3–1	4–4	7–1	2–1	4–2	3–0	1–3	2–2	0–0	1–0	1–1
Saipa	0–0	1–3		1–2	1–1	0–0	2–2	1–1	2–2	1–1	1–0	2–1	6–1	6–0	2–1	1–0
Saba Battery	1–1	2–4	1–1		1–0	1–1	3–1	1–1	2–1	0–1	3–2	0–4	1–0	1–0	2–0	1–0
Aboumoslem	1–0	0–1	1–0	0–0		1–3	0–1	5–1	1–1	0–0	1–2	1–0	2–0	1–0	1–0	2–1
Zob Ahan	1–1	3–0	0–1	0–1	1–2		2–0	3–1	3–0	1–1	1–0	1–0	2–0	2–1	1–1	4–3
Sepahan	1–0	1–1	0–1	0–2	1–1	2–0		2–0	2–0	3–0	0–0	2–2	1–3	1–0	4–0	1–0
Foolad	0–0	0–0	0–1	0–1	1–1	0–0	1–0		1–0	3–0	1–0	3–2	0–1	2–1	0–0	2–0
Persepolis	0–0	1–0	0–0	2–2	2–2	1–1	2–3	2–3		2–4	4–1	1–0	1–1	2–1	2–1	1–0
Fajr Sepasi	0–3	0–2	0–2	1–1	0–1	0–0	1–0	2–0	2–2		1–0	0–0	3–0	0–0	4–1	1–2
Malavan	2–3	1–1	1–4	0–0	1–0	3–1	1–0	1–0	1–3	2–0		3–2	0–1	1–0	1–0	2–0
Est. Ahvaz	0–2	1–2	0–1	1–0	1–0	1–1	1–3	4–2	2–2	2–1	1–1		3–2	1–1	2–3	3–2
Rah Ahan	1–2	1–3	1–0	1–0	0–2	0–2	2–1	1–2	0–0	0–0	1–0	3–1		1–1	2–1	0–1
Bargh Shiraz	1–3	1–3	0–0	2–2	1–1	2–1	1–0	0–1	0–1	0–0	2–0	0–1	1–0		3–0	1–0
Shamoushak	0–1	1–0	1–2	1–2	0–0	0–0	0–0	1–2	2–1	0–0	0–0	1–1	1–1	1–1		1–0
Shahid Ghandi	0–1	0–2	0–0	1–1	1–3	1–5	0–1	0–0	0–2	1–2	1–0	2–2	1–1	1–2	2–0	

Source: http://www.iplstats.com/
Legend: Blue = home team win; Yellow = draw; Red = away team win.

== Player statistics ==
=== Top goalscorers ===
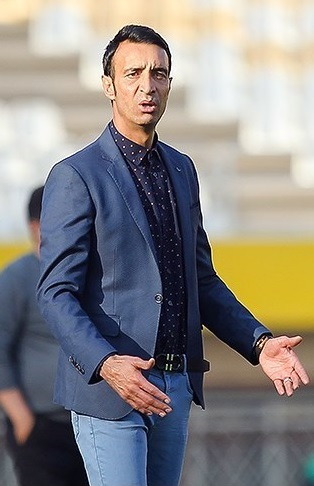
Reza Enayati

Rank	Player	Club	Goals
1	(Iran) Reza Enayati	Esteghlal	21
2	(Iran) Fereydoon Fazli	Esteghlsl Ahvaz	17
3	(Iran) Mehdi Rajabzadeh	Zob Ahan	14
4	(Iran) Siavash Akbarpour	Esteghlal	11
4	(Iran) Ali Daei	Saba Battery	11
4	(Iran) Javad Kazemian	Persepolis	11
7	(Iran) Hossein Badamaki	Aboomoslem	10
7	(Iran) Rasoul Khatibi	Sepahan	10
9	(Iran) Ali Ansarian	Persepolis	9
10	(Iran) Hadi Asghari	Rah Ahan	8
10	(Iran) Sohrab Bakhtiarizadeh	Saba Battery	8
10	(Iran) Arash Borhani	PAS Tehran	8
10	(Iran) Mohammad Gholamin	Malavan	8
10	(Iraq) Emad Reza	Foolad	8

=== Cards ===
Player	Yellow card	Red card	Team
(Iran) Mohammad Matouri	11	2	Bargh Shiraz
(Iran) Masoud Shojaei	11	0	Saipa
(Iran) Siavash Akbarpour	10	0	Esteghlal
(Iran) Yahya Golmohammadi	9	0	Saba Battery
(Iran) Pejman Jamshidi	9	0	Pas Tehran
(Iran) Alireza Vahedi Nikbakht	9	0	Esteghlal
(Iran) Amir Hossein Sadeghi	7	2	Esteghlal

=== Matches played ===
30

- (Iran) Mehdi Sabeti (Aboomoslem)

29

- (Iran) Reza Enayati (Esteghlal)
- (Iran) Alireza Pourmand (Aboomoslem)

28

- (Iran) Morteza Asadi (Saba Battery)
- (Iran) Jalal Hosseini (Saipa)
- (Iran) Pejman Montazeri (Foolad)
- (Iran) Hassan Roudbarian (Pas Tehran)
- (Bosnia and Herzegovina) Almir Tolja (Saba Battery)
- (Iran) Ali Yahyanejad (Malavan)

27

- (Iran) Sepehr Heidari (Zob Ahan)
- (Iran) Pejman Nouri (Persepolis)
- (Iran) Mehdi Rajabzadeh (Zob Ahan)
- (Iran) Mojtaba Shiri (Est. Ahvaz)
- (Iran) Mehdi Tartar (Rah Ahan)

== Attendance ==
=== Average home attendances ===
Pos	Team	Total	High	Low	Average	Change
1	Esteghlal	502,000	100,000	15,000	33,467	n/a
2	Persepolis	455,000	95,000	5,000	30,333	n/a
3	Shahid Ghandi	192,000	30,000	2,000	12,800	n/a
4	Malavan	100,000	17,000	0	7,692	n/a
5	Aboumoslem	103,000	30,000	0	7,357	n/a
6	Foolad	100,000	22,000	3,000	6,667	n/a
7	Saba Battery	87,000	20,000	1,000	5,800	n/a
8	Est. Ahvaz	85,000	14,000	1,000	5,667	n/a
9	Fajr Sepasi	81,000	20,000	2,000	5,400	n/a
10	Sepahan	77,500	17,000	2,000	5,167	n/a
11	Zob Ahan	76,000	15,000	1,000	5,067	n/a
12	Bargh Shiraz	73,500	18,000	1,000	4,900	n/a
13	Saipa	70,000	25,000	500	4,667	n/a
14	PAS Tehran	58,000	25,000	1,000	3,867	n/a
15	Rah Ahan	54,500	20,000	1,000	3,633	n/a
16	Shamoushak	42,500	7,000	0	3,542	n/a
	League total	2,157,000	100,000	0	9,179	n/a

Updated to games played on 21 April 2006
Source: iplstats.com
Notes:
Matches with spectator bans are not included in average attendances
Rah Ahan and Shahid Ghandi played last season in Azadegan League

=== Highest attendance ===
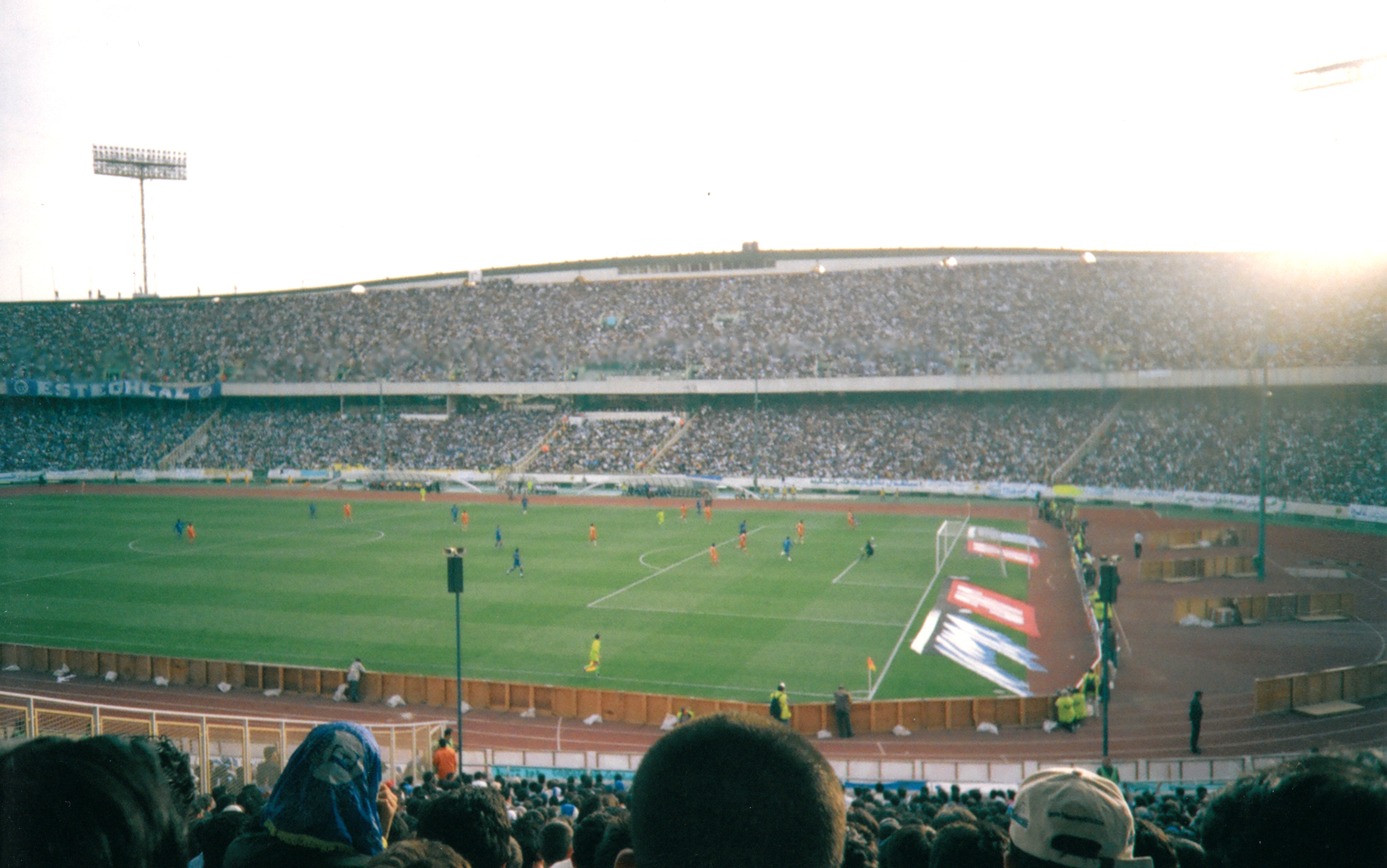
Esteghlal vs Bargh football match

Rank	Home team	Score	Away team	Attendance	Date	Week	Stadium
1	Esteghlal	4–1	Bargh Shiraz	100,000	21 April 2006	30	Azadi
2	Persepolis	0–0	Esteghlal	95,000	10 March 2006	25	Azadi
3	Esteghlal	1–0	Persepolis	80,000	4 November 2005	10	Azadi
4	Persepolis	0–0	Saipa	50,000	9 September 2005	2	Azadi
5	Persepolis	2–2	Saba Battery	40,000	27 October 2005	9	Azadi
5	Esteghlal	4–1	Foolad	40,000	6 April 2006	28	Azadi
7	Esteghlal	4–1	Saba Battery	35,000	2 September 2005	1	Azadi
7	Persepolis	1–0	PAS Tehran	35,000	29 November 2005	3	Azadi
7	Esteghlal	0–0	PAS Tehran	35,000	6 January 2006	17	Azadi
10	Persepolis	1–0	Shahid Ghandi	33,000	30 September 2005	5	Azadi

Notes:
Updated to games played on 21 April 2006. Source: iplstats.com
