= Reza Enayati =

Iranian footballer (born 1976)

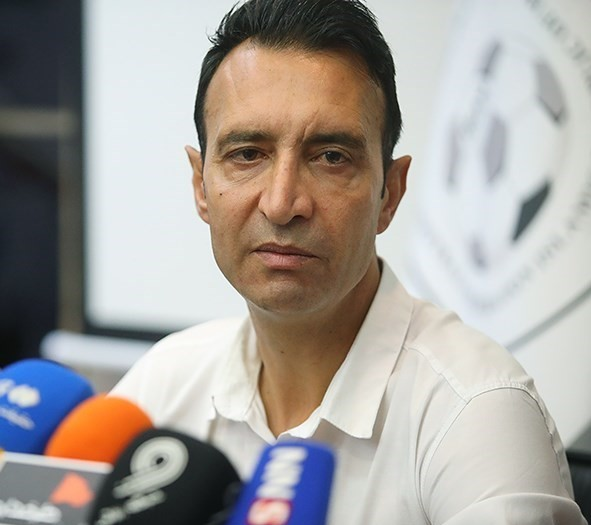
- Enayati in 2023

Personal information
- Full name: Gholam Reza Enayati
- Date of birth: 23 September 1976 (age 50)
- Place of birth: Mashhad, Iran
- Height: 1.89 m (6 ft 2 in)
- Position: Centre forward

Youth career
- 1998: Farsh Mashhad Workers

Senior career*
Years	Team	Apps	(Gls)
1998–2001	Adonis Mashhad		
2001–2003	Aboomoslem	46	(28)
2003–2006	Esteghlal	77	(56)
2006–2008	Emirates	44	(27)
2008–2009	Al-Nasr	9	(0)
2009–2010	Esteghlal	17	(4)
2010	Emirates	10	(9)
2010–2011	Sepahan	37	(7)
2011–2012	Saba Qom	31	(19)
2012–2013	Mes Kerman	34	(12)
2013–2014	Saba Qom	27	(13)
2014	Padideh	16	(7)
2014–2015	Esteghlal	13	(4)
2015–2016	Siah Jamegan	25	(5)
2016–2017	Saba Qom	23	(3)
Total		394	(193)

International career^{‡}
2002–2008	Iran	30	(7)

Managerial career
- 2017: Saba Qom (player-coach)
- 2017: Siah Jamegan (assistant)
- 2017–2018: Siah Jamegan (caretaker)
- 2018–2019: Esteghlal B
- 2019: Qashqai
- 2019–2022: Havadar
- 2023: Naft Masjed Soleyman
- 2023: Iran U23
- 2023–2024: Paykan
- 2025–2026: Saipa
- 2026: Nassaji Mazandaran
- 2026: Palayesh Naft
- * Club domestic league appearances and goals as of 1 July 2016 ‡ National team caps and goals as of 1 December 2008

Gholam Reza Enayati (Persian: غلام رضا عنايتى; born 23 September 1976) is an Iranian football manager and former player. Enayati played as a striker in the Persian Gulf Pro League and for the Iran national football team. He is the all-time top goalscorer in the Persian Gulf Pro League.

== Club career ==
Reza Enayati started out his professional career playing for his hometown club Aboomoslem. He had a number of impressive seasons there, especially the 2001–02 season where he finished as the league's top goalscorer and was called up to the national team.

He remained in Aboomoslem for the 2002–03 season but the year after and after being linked with a move to Persepolis, he signed with Esteghlal. He was not able to impress in his first season in Tehran, but in the 2004–05 season he was able to show his talents and was able to finish as the IPL's top goalscorer again with 20 goals. The next season, he was just as impressive, scoring 21 goals, finishing as the league's top scorer and helping his club Esteghlal win the championship and also broke the record of scoring in a season in Iran and he is the all-time top scorer of Persian Gulf Cup. After World Cup 2006 he signed with the Emirates club. On 19 March 2007, Enayati extended his contract with UAE League side Al-Emarat in a deal that will keep him there until the end of the 2007–08 season.

In 2008, he secured a six-month contract with Al-Nasr. In July 2009 season he moved back to Esteghlal but after half a season he moved to Emirate league once again and joined Emirates where he scored 8 goals. For 2010–11 season Enayati signed with Sepahan for one year and joined his former coach Amir Ghalenoei where he helped the club to win the league title. He then joined to Saba Qom and later Mes Kerman. He returned to Saba on 1 July 2013. On 7 May 2014, he signed a contract with Padideh, effective from 1 July. He was given number 10 shirt. He made his debut for Padideh in 0–0 draw against Malavan on 1 August 2014. He scored his first goal for Padideh in next match, where they won the match against Naft Masjed Soleyman 3–0, which Enayati scored the final goal.

Enayati moved back to Esteghlal on 31 December 2014.

=== Club career statistics ===
As of 18 February 2018

Club performance			League		Cup		Continental		Total	
Season	Club	League	Apps	Goals	Apps	Goals	Apps	Goals	Apps	Goals
Iran			League		Hazfi Cup		Asia		Total	
2001–02	Aboomoslem	Pro League	23	17	0	0	–	–	23	17
2002–03	Aboomoslem	Pro League	23	11	0	0	–	–	23	11
2003–04	Esteghlal	Pro League	18	11	5	3	–	–	23	14
2004–05	Esteghlal	Pro League	24	20	0	0	–	–	24	20
2005–06	Esteghlal	Pro League	29	21	1	1	–	–	30	22
United Arab Emirates			League		President's Cup		Asia		Total	
2006–07	Emirates	UAE League	20	13	2	2	–	–	22	15
2007–08	Emirates	UAE League	21	12	1	0	–	–	22	12
2008–09	Al Nasr	UAE League	9	0	0	0	–	–	9	0
Iran			League		Hazfi Cup		Asia		Total	
2009–10	Esteghlal	Pro League	17	4	0	0	0	0	17	4
United Arab Emirates			League		President's Cup		Asia		Total	
2009–10	Emirates	UAE League	10	8	0	0	–	–	10	8
Iran			League		Hazfi Cup		Asia		Total	
2010–11	Sepahan	Pro League	30	4	3	2	4	1	37	7
2011–12	Saba Qom	Pro League	29	18	2	1	–	–	31	19
2012–13	Mes Kerman	Pro League	33	11	1	1	–	–	34	12
2013–14	Saba Qom	Pro League	27	13	1	0	–	–	28	13
2014–15	Padideh	Pro League	14	5	2	2	–	–	16	7
2014–15	Esteghlal	Pro League	13	4	0	0	0	0	13	4
2015–16	Siah Jamegan	Pro League	25	5	0	0	–	–	25	5
2016–17	Saba Qom	Pro League	23	3	0	0	–	–	23	3
Total	Iran		358	147	15	10	4	1	377	158
Total	United Arab Emirates		60	33	3	2	0	0	63	35
Career total			418	180	18	12	4	1	440	193

^{1} Statistics Incomplete.

The information in Hazfi Cup and UAE Emir Cup is not complete

=== Assists ===
Season	Team	Assists
2005–06	Esteghlal	4
2009–10	Esteghlal	3
2010–11	Sepahan	3
2011–12	Saba Qom	1
2012–13	Mes Kerman	2
2013–14	Saba Qom	3
2014–15	Padideh	1

== International career ==
Reza Enayati made his debut for Iran in a game versus Palestine in April 2002. Since then he has had numerous callups to the national team, including Iran's recent 2004 Asian Cup and 2006 FIFA World Cup Qualifying campaigns. He was among Iran's final squad for World Cup 2006 but did not make an appearance.

He has been selected to join the squad for the 2007 Asian Nations Cup in Kuala Lumpur, Malaysia. He appeared against the Uzbekistan national football team, playing 90 minutes, on 11 July, and was selected again into the starting eleven in the game against the China national football team on 15 July. He was called up again for 2010 FIFA World Cup Qualifying but left the camp in the first round as Ali Daei preferred Mohsen Khalili in few matches over him.

=== International goals ===
#	Date	Venue	Opponent	Score	Result	Competition
8	2 July 2007	Tehran, Iran	Jamaica	8–1	Win	Friendly
7	15 October 2006	Tehran, Iran	South Korea	2–0	Win	2007 AFC Asian Cup qualification
6	8 August 2006	Tehran, Iran	United Arab Emirates	1–0	Win	Friendly
5	31 May 2006	Tehran, Iran	Bosnia and Herzegovina	5–2	Win	Friendly
4	20 July 2004	Chongqing, Chongqing	Thailand	3–0	Win	2004 AFC Asian Cup
3	31 March 2004	Vientiane, Laos	Laos	7–0	Win	2006 FIFA World Cup qualification
2	31 March 2004	Vientiane, Laos	Laos	7–0	Win	2006 FIFA World Cup qualification
1	4 April 2002	Kuwait City, Kuwait	Kuwait	2–2	Draw	Friendly

== Managerial statistics ==
As of 16 February 2023

Team	From	To	Record				
Team	From	To	G	W	D	L	Win %
Siah Jamegan	1 December 2017	5 March 2018	14	1	4	9	7.14
Qashqai Shiraz	16 June 2019	16 September 2019	5	1	1	3	20.00
Havadar	22 December 2019	4 June 2022	83	35	25	23	42.17
Naft Masjed Soleyman	23 January 2023	Present	4	0	3	1	0.00
Iran U23	21 May 2023	Present	12	6	4	2	50.00
Total			106	37	33	36	34.91

== Honours ==
=== Player ===
Esteghlal

- Iran Pro League: 2005–06; runner-up 2003–04

Sepahan

- Iran Pro League: 2010–11

Individual

- Iran Pro League top goalscorer: 2001–02 (17 goals), 2004–05 (20 goals), 2005–06 (21 goals)
- Top scorer in Iran Pro League (154 goals)

=== Manager ===
Havadar

- Azadegan League runner-up: 2020–21

Iran U23

- WAFF U-23 Championship runner-up: 2023
