= 2009–10 Esteghlal F.C. season =

Esteghlal Tehran FC
2009–10 season
- President: Vaezi Ashtiani
- Head coach: Samad Marfavi
- Stadium: Azadi Stadium
- IPL: 3rd
- Hazfi Cup: 1/8 Final
- Champions League: Round of 16
- Top goalscorer: League: Arash Borhani (11); All: Farhad Majidi (16)
- Highest home attendance: 98,225 vs Persepolis (2 October 2009)
- Lowest home attendance: 0 vs Sepahan (7 August 2009)
- Average home league attendance: 32,389
Home colours	Away colours	Third colours

== First-team squad ==
Note: Flags indicate national team as defined under FIFA eligibility rules; some limited exceptions apply. Players may hold more than one non-FIFA nationality.

No.	Pos.	Nation	Player
1	GK	(Iran) IRN	Vahid Taleblou
2	DF	(Iran) IRN	Khosro Heidari
3	DF	(Iran) IRN	Mehdi Amirabadi
4	MF	(Iran) IRN	Hossein Kazemi
5	DF	(Iran) IRN	Bijan Koshki
6	DF	(Iran) IRN	Hadi Shakouri
7	FW	(Iran) IRN	Farhad Majidi
8	MF	(Iran) IRN	Mojtaba Jabari
9	FW	(Iran) IRN	Arash Borhani
10	FW	(Iran) IRN	Siavash Akbarpour
11	FW	(Iran) IRN	Reza Enayati
12	FW	(Iran) IRN	Mehdi Seyed Salehi
13	MF	(Iran) IRN	Mohsen Yousefi
14	MF	(Iran) IRN	Kianoosh Rahmati

No.	Pos.	Nation	Player
15	DF	(Iran) IRN	Hanif Omranzadeh
16	MF	(Iran) IRN	Hashem Beikzadeh
18	MF	(Iran) IRN	Mehrshad Momeni
19	MF	(Iran) IRN	Mehran Noorafkan
20	GK	(Iran) IRN	Mohammad Mohammadi
21	MF	(Iran) IRN	Milad Nouri
22	DF	(Iran) IRN	Amir Hossein Sadeghi
23	MF	(Iran) IRN	Omid Ravankhah
25	FW	(Iran) IRN	Mojtaba Mojaz
27	MF	(Iran) IRN	Yaghob Karimi
28	MF	(Peru) PER	Rinaldo Cruzado
31	GK	(Iran) IRN	Iman Sadeghi
33	DF	(Iran) IRN	Pejman Montazeri
37	MF	(Brazil) BRA	Fábio Januário

== Transfers ==
=== Esteghlal ===
In: Note: Flags indicate national team as defined under FIFA eligibility rules; some limited exceptions apply. Players may hold more than one non-FIFA nationality.

No.	Pos.	Nation	Player
20	GK	(Iran) IRN	Mohammad Mohammadi (from Paykan)
22	DF	(Iran) IRN	Amir Hossein Sadeghi (from Mes)
17	MF	(Iran) IRN	Mehrshad Momeni (from Pas Hamedan F.C.)
18	MF	(Iran) IRN	Kianoush Rahmati (from Saipa)
--	MF	(Iran) IRN	Mehran Noorafkan (from Bargh Shiraz)
11	FW	(Iran) IRN	Reza Enayati ( (United Arab Emirates) from Al-Nasr SC)
12	FW	(Iran) IRN	Mehdi Seyed Salehi (from Paykan)

Out: Note: Flags indicate national team as defined under FIFA eligibility rules; some limited exceptions apply. Players may hold more than one non-FIFA nationality.

No.	Pos.	Nation	Player
—	MF	(Iran) IRN	Asghar Nadali (to Nassaji Mazandaran F.C.)
22	GK	(Iran) IRN	Ashkan Namdari (to Aboomoslem)
--	GK	(Iran) IRN	Mohammad Hossein Naeiji (to Persepolis)
13	DF	(Iran) IRN	Ebrahim Taghipour (to Nassaji Mazandaran F.C.)
20	DF	(Iran) IRN	Pirouz Ghorbani (to Mes Kerman F.C.)
11	MF	(Iran) IRN	Meysam Manei (to Mes Kerman F.C.)
18	MF	(Iran) IRN	Mehrdad Pooladi (to Tractor Sazi)
24	MF	(Iran) IRN	Hossein Ghanbari (to Malavan)
25	MF	(Iran) IRN	Saeid Bayat (to Pas Hamedan F.C.)
29	MF	(Iran) IRN	Yadollah Akbari (to Pas Hamedan F.C.)
12	FW	(Iran) IRN	Ahmad Khaziravi (to Bargh Shiraz)
19	FW	(Iran) IRN	Ali Alizadeh (to Bargh Shiraz)
40	FW	(Iran) IRN	Alireza Abbasfard (to Paykan F.C.)
11	FW	(Iran) IRN	Reza Enayati (to Emirates Club)

== Matches ==
August 7, 2009 1	Esteghlal F.C.	1 – 0	Sepahan F.C.	Tehran, Iran
	Ravankhah 61'			Stadium: Azadi Stadium; Referee: Mombeini

August 15, 2009 2	Moghavemat Sepasi F.C.	0 – 0	Esteghlal F.C.	Shiraz, Iran
				Stadium: Hafezieh Stadium; Referee: Haghverdi

August 21, 2009 3	Esteghlal F.C.	1 – 0	Foolad F.C.	Tehran, Tehran Province, Iran
	Enayati 48'			Stadium: Azadi Stadium; Referee: Faghani

August 27, 2009 4	Malavan F.C.	0 – 0	Esteghlal F.C.	Bandar-e Anzali, Iran
				Stadium: Takhti Stadium; Referee: Mozafarizadeh

September 7, 2009 5	Esteghlal F.C.	2 – 1	Saipa F.C.	Tehran, Iran
	Shakouri 77'; Borhani 94'		Sadeghi 79'	Stadium: Azadi Stadium; Referee: Moradi

September 13, 2009 6	Tractor Sazi F.C.	1 – 1	Esteghlal F.C.	Tabriz, Iran
	Ebrahimi 80'		Majidi 25'	Stadium: Yadegar-e Emam Stadium; Referee: Torki

September 18, 2009 7	Esteghlal F.C.	2 – 0	Steel Azin F.C.	Tehran, Iran
	Borhani 26' 81'			Stadium: Azadi Stadium; Referee: Mombeini

September 24, 2009 8	F.C. Aboomoslem	0 – 5	Esteghlal F.C.	Mashhad, Razavi Khorasan, Iran
			Majidi 54'; Borhani 65'; Kazemi 67'; Seyed Salehi 90'; Akbarpour 93'	Stadium: Samen Stadium; Referee: Jahanbazi

October 2, 2009 9	Esteghlal F.C.	1 – 1	Persepolis	Tehran, Iran
	Kazemi 55'		Kolahkaj 49'	Stadium: Azadi Stadium; Referee: Torki

October 2, 2009 10	Mes Kerman F.C.	1 – 2	Esteghlal F.C.	Kerman, Kermān Province, Iran
	Giovanini 27'		Januario 10'; Borhani 64'	Stadium: Shahid Bahonar Stadium; Referee: Afsharian

October 12, 2009 11	Esteghlal F.C.	2 – 3	Esteghlal Ahvaz F.C.	Tehran, Iran
	Borhani 16'; Enayati 21'		Magholi 49'; Khalifeh-Asl 84'; Bijani 94'	Stadium: Azadi Stadium; Referee: Moradi

October 17, 2009 12	Pas Hamedan F.C.	0 – 0	Esteghlal F.C.	Hamedan, Hamadān Province, Iran
				Stadium: Ghods Stadium; Referee: Hajipour

October 23, 2009 13	Esteghlal F.C.	1 – 1	Saba Qom F.C.	Tehran, Iran
	Borhani 54'		Nouri 05'	Stadium: Azadi Stadium; Referee: Faghani

October 27, 2009 14	Zob Ahan F.C.	1 – 0	Esteghlal F.C.	Esfahan, Isfahan Province, Iran
	Khalatbari 23'			Stadium: Foolad Shahr Stadium; Referee: Mozafari Zadeh

November 2, 2009 15	Esteghlal F.C.	2 – 1	Shahin Bushehr F.C.	Tehran, Iran
	Enayati 48'; Borhani 57'		Ahmadpouri 65'	Stadium: Azadi Stadium; Referee: Hajbabaei

November 7, 2009 16	Rah Ahan F.C.	3 – 2	Esteghlal F.C.	Tehran, Iran
	Noormohammadi 12'; Zanidpour 55'; Traore 77'		Kazemi 45'; Shakouri 71'	Stadium: Azadi Stadium; Referee: Ghahremani

November 28, 2009 17	Esteghlal F.C.	2 – 3	Paykan F.C.	Tehran, Iran
	Sadeghi 16'; Kazemi 66'		Daghighi 38'; Khodabandelo 44'; Hedayati 68'	Stadium: Azadi Stadium; Referee: Afsharian

December 27, 2009 18	Sepahan F.C.	2 – 0	Esteghlal F.C.	Esfahan, Isfahan Province, Iran
	Ridha 45'; Ridha 62'			Stadium: Foolad Shahr Stadium; Referee: Moradi

December 11, 2009 19	Esteghlal F.C.	3 – 2	Moghavemat Sepasi F.C.	Tehran, Iran
	Rahmati 22'; Majidi 45' 92'		Karimian 46'; Sadeghi 90'O.G.	Stadium: Azadi Stadium; Referee: Rafiei

December 17, 2009 20	Foolad F.C.	1 – 1	Esteghlal F.C.	Ahvaz, Khūzestān, Iran
	Bartolovic 55'		Seyed Salehi 94'	Stadium: Takhti Stadium; Referee: Ghahremani

December 22, 2009 21	Esteghlal F.C.	2 – 2	Malavan F.C.	Tehran, Iran
	Borhani 36'; Sadeghi 49'		Alves de Souza 57'; Heidari 58'	Stadium: Azadi Stadium; Referee: Mombeini

January 1, 2010 22	Saipa F.C.	1 – 1	Esteghlal F.C.	Tehran, Iran
	Khaleghifar 24' 55'		Omranzadeh 95'	Stadium: Azadi Stadium; Referee: Jahanbazi

January 15, 2010 23	Esteghlal F.C.	2 – 2	Tractor Sazi F.C.	Tehran, Iran
	Majidi 45'; Omranzadeh 70'		Pouladi 32'; Ekrami 50'	Stadium: Azadi Stadium; Referee: Moradi

January 23, 2010 24	Steel Azin F.C.	0 – 2	Esteghlal F.C.	Tehran, Iran
			Seyed Salehi 72'; Montazeri 76'	Stadium: Azadi Stadium; Referee: Torki

January 29, 2010 25	Esteghlal F.C.	3 – 1	F.C. Aboomoslem	Tehran, Iran
	Moumouni 02' O.G. Majidi 78'; Borhani 93'		Zeighami 68'	Stadium: Azadi Stadium; Referee: Bakhshizadeh

February 3, 2010 26	Persepolis	2 – 1	Esteghlal F.C.	Tehran, Iran
	Norouzi 36'; Bagheri 87'		Majidi 16'	Stadium: Azadi Stadium; Referee: Mozafari Zadeh

February 17, 2010 27	Esteghlal F.C.	2 – 0	Mes Kerman F.C.	Tehran, Iran
	Omranzadeh 13'; Majidi 37'			Stadium: Azadi Stadium; Referee: Mombeini

March 5, 2010 28	Esteghlal Ahvaz F.C.	0 – 2	Esteghlal F.C.	Ahvaz, Khūzestān, Iran
			Sadeghi 16'; Seyed Salehi 46'	Stadium: Takhti Stadium; Referee: Ghahremani

March 15, 2010 29	Esteghlal F.C.	1 – 0	Pas Hamedan F.C.	Tehran, Iran
	Majidi 78'			Stadium: Azadi Stadium; Referee: Jahanbazi

April 4, 2010 30	Saba Qom F.C.	2 – 1	Esteghlal F.C.	Qom, Qom Province, Iran
	Ansari 76'; Clementino 93'		Borhani 33'	Stadium: Yadegar-e Emam Stadium; Referee: Moradi

April 19, 2010 31	Esteghlal F.C.	1 – 0	Zob Ahan F.C.	Tehran, Iran
	Akbarpour 41'			Stadium: Azadi Stadium; Referee: Ghahremani

May 2, 2010 32	Shahin Bushehr F.C.	0 – 1	Esteghlal F.C.	Bushehr, Bushehr Province, Iran
			Cruzado 35'	Stadium: Shahid Beheshti Stadium; Referee: Torki

May 6, 2010 33	Esteghlal F.C.	1 – 0	Rah Ahan F.C.	Tehran, Iran
	Majidi 91'			Stadium: Azadi Stadium; Referee: Jahanbazi

May 19, 2010 34	Paykan F.C.	1 – 1	Esteghlal F.C.	Qazvin, Qazvīn Province, Iran
	Taleblou 83' O.G.		Montazeri 33'	Stadium: Shahid Rajaei Stadium; Referee: Ghahremani

== Final standings ==
Pos	Team	Pld	W	D	L	GF	GA	GD	Pts	Qualification or relegation
1	Sepahan (C)	34	19	10	5	67	30	+37	67	Qualification for the 2011 AFC Champions League
2	Zob Ahan	34	16	13	5	48	29	+19	61	Qualification for the 2011 AFC Champions League
3	Esteghlal	34	16	11	7	49	32	+17	59	Qualification for the 2011 AFC Champions League
4	Persepolis	34	13	14	7	46	40	+6	53	Qualification for the 2011 AFC Champions League
5	Steel Azin	34	13	13	8	55	49	+6	52	

Updated to match(es) played on 01 SEP 2018. Source: IPL Stats, Soccerway
Rules for classification: 1) Points; 2) Goal difference; 3) Goals scored.
(C) Champions

== AFC Champions League ==
=== Group stage ===
Pos	Team	Pld	W	D	L	GF	GA	GD	Pts	Qualification
1	(Qatar) Al-Gharafa	6	4	1	1	11	9	+2	13	Advance to knockout stage
2	(Iran) Esteghlal	6	3	2	1	9	5	+4	11	Advance to knockout stage
3	(Saudi Arabia) Al-Ahli	6	2	0	4	11	9	+2	6	
4	(United Arab Emirates) Al-Jazira	6	1	1	4	6	14	−8	4	

Source: AFC Champions League Official Page

Win Draw Loss

23 February 2010 G1	Al-Ahli (Saudi Arabia)	1 – 2	(Iran) Esteghlal	Jeddah
20:20 (UTC+3)	Al-Raheb 85'	Report	11', 75' Majidi	Stadium: Prince Abdullah al-Faisal Stadium; Attendance: 16,000; Referee: Hiroyoshi Takayama (Japan)

9 March 2010 G2	Esteghlal (Iran)	0 – 0	(United Arab Emirates) Al-Jazira	Tehran
17:30 (UTC+3:30)		Report		Stadium: Azadi Stadium, Tehran; Attendance: 32,000; Referee: Choi Myung-Yong (Korea Republic)

23 March 2010 G3	Esteghlal (Iran)	3 – 0	(Qatar) Al-Gharafa	Tehran
17:30 (UTC+4:30)	Majidi 13', 53'; Montazeri 79'	Report		Stadium: Azadi Stadium; Attendance: 60,000; Referee: Valentin Kovalenko (Uzbekistan)

31 March 2010 G4	Al-Gharafa (Qatar)	1 – 1	(Iran) Esteghlal	Doha
18:45 (UTC+3)	Younis Mahmoud 45+3'	Report	59' Seyed-Salehi	Stadium: Al-Gharafa Stadium; Attendance: 6,023; Referee: Peter Green (Australia)

14 April 2010 G5	Esteghlal (Iran)	2 – 1	(Saudi Arabia) Al-Ahli	Tehran
17:30 (UTC+4:30)	Seyed-Salehi 25'; Sadeghi 44'	Report	36' (pen.) Victor Simões	Stadium: Azadi Stadium; Attendance: 64,840; Referee: Sun Baojie (China)

28 April 2010 G6	Al-Jazira (United Arab Emirates)	2 – 1	(Iran) Esteghlal	Abu Dhabi
19:45 (UTC+4)	Basheer 51'; Ahmed 53'	Report	38' Majidi	Stadium: Mohamed Bin Zayid Stadium; Attendance: 2,129; Referee: Minoru Tojo (Japan)

=== Round of 16 ===
11 May 2010 Round of 16	Al-Shabab (Saudi Arabia)	3 – 2	(Iran) Esteghlal	Riyadh
20:45 (UTC+3)	Bin Sultan 22'; Al-Taib 47'; Al Jeizani 88'	Report	24' (pen.) Akbarpour; 31' Kazemi	Stadium: King Fahd International Stadium; Attendance: 6,853; Referee: Toma Maasaki (Japan)

== Goalscorers ==
Last updated Friday, May 14, 2010

Scorer	League	Hazfi Cup	ACL	Total
(Iran) Farhad Majidi	10	1	4	15
(Iran) Arash Borhani	11	3	0	14
(Iran) Seyed Mehdi Seyed Salehi	4	4	2	10
(Iran) Siavash Akbarpour	2	3	1	6
(Iran) Hossein Kazemi	4	0	1	5
(Iran) Amir Hossein Sadeghi	4	0	1	5
(Iran) Hanif Omranzadeh	3	1	0	4
(Iran) Reza Enayati	3	0	0	3
(Iran) Pejman Montazeri	2	0	1	3
(Iran) Hadi Shakouri	2	1	0	3
(Brazil) Fabio Januario	1	1	0	2
(Iran) Milad Noori	0	2	0	2
(Peru) Rinaldo Cruzado	1	1	0	2
(Iran) Kianoush Rahmati	1	0	0	1
(Iran) Omid Ravankhah	1	0	0	1
Total goals Scored	49	17	10	76

== Goalassistants ==
Assist	League
(Iran) Khosro Heidari	13
(Brazil) Fabio Januario	6
(Iran) Seyed Mehdi Seyed Salehi	5
(Iran) Siavash Akbarpour	4
(Iran) Reza Enayati	3
(Iran) Farhad Majidi	2
(Iran) Arash Borhani	1
(Iran) Pejman Montazeri	1
(Iran) Milad Noori	1
(Iran) Amir Hossein Sadeghi	1
(Iran) Kianoush Rahmati	1
(Iran) Mohsen Yousefi	1
Total Goal Assistants	39

Last updated Friday, November 21, 2010
