= 2008–09 Esteghlal F.C. season =

Esteghlal Tehran FC
2008–09 season
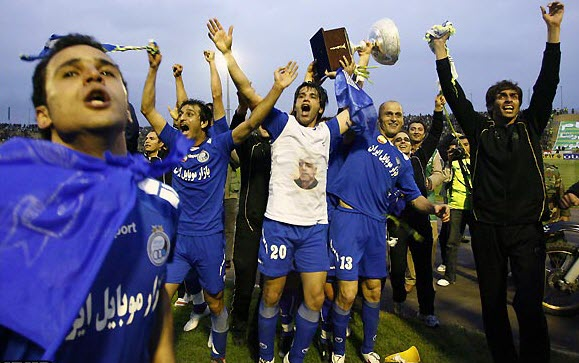
- President: Ali Fathollahzadeh (until Sep 2008); Vaezi Ashtiani
- Head coach: Amir Ghalenoei
- IPL: Champions
- Hazfi Cup: Fourth round
- Champions League: Group Stages
- Top goalscorer: League: Arash Borhani (20); All: Arash Borhani (27)

This is a list of Esteghlal F.C.'s results at the 2008–09 IPL, 2009 ACL, Super Cup 2008 and 2008–09 Hazfi Cup. The club is competing in the Iran Pro League, Hazfi Cup. Iranian Super Cup and Asian Champions League.

== Persian Gulf Cup ==
=== Statistics ===
Country	No.	Position	Name	2008-2009																	
Country	No.	Position	Name	IPL						Hazfi						ACL					
Country	No.	Position	Name	App	GS	Min	Yellow card	Yellow card Red card	Red card	App	GS	Min	Yellow card	Yellow card Red card	Red card	App	GS	Min	Yellow card	Yellow card Red card	Red card
(Iran) IRN	1	GK	Vahid Talebloo	2	-	187	-	-	-	-	-	-	-	-	-	-	-	-	-	-	-
(Iran) IRN	3	MF	Mehdi Amirabadi	3	1	228	-	-	-	-	-	-	-	-	-	-	-	-	-	-	-
(Iran) IRN	4	MF	Hossein Kazemi	2	-	187	1	-	-	-	-	-	-	-	-	-	-	-	-	-	-
(Iran) IRN	5	DF	Bijan Koshki	2	-	171	-	-	-	-	-	-	-	-	-	-	-	-	-	-	-
(Iran) IRN	6	DF	Hadi Shakouri	1	-	94	-	-	-	-	-	-	-	-	-	-	-	-	-	-	-
(Iran) IRN	7	FW	Farhad Majidi (c)	1	-	83	-	-	-	-	-	-	-	-	-	-	-	-	-	-	-
(Iran) IRN	8	MF	Mojtaba Jabari	3	1	264	-	-	-	-	-	-	-	-	-	-	-	-	-	-	-
(Iran) IRN	9	FW	Arash Borhani	1	-	46	-	-	-	-	-	-	-	-	-	-	-	-	-	-	-
(Iran) IRN	10	FW	Siavash Akbarpour	3	-	273	-	-	-	-	-	-	-	-	-	-	-	-	-	-	-
(Iran) IRN	11	MF	Meysam Maniei	3	-	148	-	-	-	-	-	-	-	-	-	-	-	-	-	-	-
(Iran) IRN	12	FW	Ahmad Khaziravi	1	-	8	-	-	-	-	-	-	-	-	-	-	-	-	-	-	-
(Iran) IRN	13	DF	Ebrahim Taghipour	1	-	94	-	-	-	-	-	-	-	-	-	-	-	-	-	-	-
(Iran) IRN	14	MF	Yadollah Akbari	2	-	57	-	-	-	-	-	-	-	-	-	-	-	-	-	-	-
(Iran) IRN	15	FW	Alireza Abbasfard	1	-	16	-	-	-	-	-	-	-	-	-	-	-	-	-	-	-
(Iran) IRN	16	MF	Hashem Beikzadeh	-	-	-	-	-	-	-	-	-	-	-	-	-	-	-	-	-	-
(Brazil) BRA	17	MF	Fábio Januário	-	-	-	-	-	-	-	-	-	-	-	-	-	-	-	-	-	-
(Iran) IRN	18	MF	Mehrdad Pooladi	1	-	44	1	-	-	-	-	-	-	-	-	-	-	-	-	-	-
(Iran) IRN	19	FW	Ali Alizadeh	3	-	237	1	-	-	-	-	-	-	-	-	-	-	-	-	-	-
(Iran) IRN	20	DF	Pirouz Ghorbani	3	1	281	-	-	-	-	-	-	-	-	-	-	-	-	-	-	-
(Iran) IRN	21	MF	Milad Nouri	-	-	-	-	-	-	-	-	-	-	-	-	-	-	-	-	-	-
(Iran) IRN	22	GK	Ashkan Namdari	1	-	94	-	-	-	-	-	-	-	-	-	-	-	-	-	-	-
(Iran) IRN	23	MF	Omid Ravankhah	1	-	17	-	-	-	-	-	-	-	-	-	-	-	-	-	-	-
(Iran) IRN	27	MF	Khosro Heydari	3	-	281	-	-	-	-	-	-	-	-	-	-	-	-	-	-	-
(Iran) IRN	33	DF	Pejman Montazeri	3	-	281	-	-	-	-	-	-	-	-	-	-	-	-	-	-	-

=== Matches ===
Last updated Apr 26 2009

#	Date	Home	Score	Away	Goal	Yellow card	Red card	Attendance	Ref.	Rank
1	2008-08-05	Esteghlal	2-0	Aboomoslem	Mojtaba Jabbari (57), Mehdi Amirabadi (67)	-	-	30,000	Khodadad Afsharian	1
2	2008-08-09	Pegah	1-0	Esteghlal	-	Ali Alizade	-	10,000	Rahim Rahimi Moghadam	7
3	2008-08-17	Esteghlal	1-1	Sepahan	Pirouz Ghorbani (74)	Mehrdad Pooladi, Hossain Kazemi	-	30,000	Mohsen Torky	6
4	2008-08-24	Mes Kerman	1-0	Esteghlal	-	Farhad Majidi, Alireza Abbasfard	-	10,000	Hedayat Mombini	12
5	2008-10-17	Esteghlal	1-1	Bargh	Samad Zare (16) o.g	Pirooz Ghorbani, Farhad Majidi	-	50000	Mahmoud Rafei	5
6	2008-09-12	Saba QOM	3-1	Esteghlal	Siavash Akbarpour (57)	-	-	15000	Khodadad Afsharian	17
7	2008-09-18	Esteghlal	6-0	Esteghlal Ahvaz	Arash Borhani (21), (68), Pirooz Ghorbani (34), Hashem Bayk Zadeh (50), Farhad Majidi (73), (90)	-	-	25000	Shahin Hajbabaei	8
8	2008-09-27	Esteghlal	2-1	Rah Ahan	Pirooz Ghorbani (34), Arash Borhani (39)	Hashem Bayk Zadeh, Siavash Akbarpour	-	50000	Alireza Faghani	6
9	2008-10-03	Persepolis	1-1	Esteghlal	Arash Borhani (47)	Arash Borhani	-	95000	Saed Kamil	7
10	2008-10-07	Esteghlal	5-2	Moghavemat	Meysam Maniei (11), Khosrow Haydari (33), Siavash Akbarpour (63) (69), Fabio Daniel Janavario (75)	Mojtaba Jabbari	-	15000	Rahim Rahimi Moghadam	6
11	2008-10-21	PAS Hamedan	2-4	Esteghlal	Ali Alizade (30), Mojtaba Jabbari (72) (74), Arash Borhani (90+2)	Hossain Kazemi, Khosrow Haydari	-	12000	Mohsen Torky	4
12	2008-10-27	Esteghlal	3-2	Paykan	Arash Borhani (33)pen, (37), (42)	Yadollah Akbari, Fabio Daniel Janavario	Yadollah Akbari	30000	Saeed Mozafari Zadeh	3
13	2008-10-31	Esteghlal	2-0	Zob Ahan	Hossain Kazemi (77), Mojtaba Jabbari (84)	-	-	50000	Mohsen Ghahremani	3
14	2008-11-06	Malavan	2-2	Esteghlal	Siavash Akbarpour (32), Alireza Abbasfard (90+3)	Ali Alizade, Hadi Shakori, Hossain Kazemi, Pirooz Ghorbani, Alireza Abbasfard	-	15000	Masoud Moradi	3
15	2008-11-21	Esteghlal	0-1	Foolad	-	-	-	40000	Yadolah Jahanbazi	3
16	2008-11-29	Saipa	0-2	Esteghlal	Pirooz Ghorbani (66), Arash Borhani (68)	Siavash Akbarpour	-	20000	Hedayat Mombeini	3
17	2008-12-03	Esteghlal	5-0	Payam Mashhad	Siavash Akbarpour (39) (44) (76), Arash Borhani (67) (84)pen	Arash Borhani	-	10000	Saeed Bakhshizadeh	2
18	2008-12-07	Aboomoslem	0-2	Esteghlal	Mehdi Amirabadi (13), Siavash Akbarpour (90)	Siavash Akbarpour, Ali Alizade, Mehdi Amirabadi	-	10000	Saeed Mozafari Zadeh	1
19	2008-12-12	Esteghlal	4-2	Damash Gilan	Mehdi Noori (25) o.g, Pirooz Ghorbani (43), Hossain Kazemi (74), Arash Borhani (75)	Khosrow Haydari	-	40000	Toraj Haghverdi	1
20	2008-12-30	Sepahan	2-1	Esteghlal	Arash Borhani (74)	-	-	18000	Rahim Rahimi Moghadam	1
21	2009-01-03	Esteghlal	2-1	Mes Kerman	Hossain Kazemi (54), Arash Borhani (90)	Arash Borhani	-	20000	Yadolah Jahanbazi	1
22	2009-01-16	Bargh	1-4	Esteghlal	Hossain Kazemi (27) (53), Fabio Daniel Janavario (46), Siavash Akbarpour (56)	Arash Borhani, Hadi Shakori, Fabio Daniel Janavario	-	30000	Mohsen Ghahremani	1
23	2009-01-23	Esteghlal	2-1	Saba QOM	Alireza Abbasfard (38), Farhad Majidi (46)	Fabio Daniel Janavario	-	60000	Ahmad Salehi	1
24	2009-01-31	Esteghlal Ahvaz	0-3	Esteghlal	Siavash Akbarpour (1), Alireza Abbasfard (32), Arash Borhani (84)	Farhad Majidi	-	20000	Masoud Moradi	1
25	2009-02-04	Rah Ahan	1-5	Esteghlal	Hossain Kazemi (10), Arash Borhani (31)pen (88), Mojtaba Jabbari (50), Siavash Akbarpour (55)	Hossain Kazemi, Fabio Daniel Janavario	-	20000	Yadolah Jahanbazi	1
26	2009-02-13	Esteghlal	1-1	Persepolis	Mojtaba Jabbari (56)	Mehdi Amirabadi, Khosrow Haydari, Farhad Majidi	-	90000	Mohsen Torky	1
27	2009-02-18	Moghavemat	4-1	Esteghlal	Alireza Abbasfard (70)	Mojtaba Jabbari, Bijan Koshki	-	17000	Hedayat Mombeini	1
28	2009-02-22	Esteghlal	1-0	PAS Hamedan	Siavash Akbarpour (22)	Bijan Koshki, Khosrow Haydari, Siavash Akbarpour	Farhad Majidi	15000	Alireza Faghani	1
29	2009-02-28	Paykan	1-1	Esteghlal	Mojtaba Jabbari (65)	-	-	10000	Yadolah Jahanbazi	1
30	2009-03-04	Zob Ahan	1-1	Esteghlal	Mojtaba Jabbari (56)pen	Hashem Beikzadeh, Siavash Akbarpour, Pirouz Ghorbani	Ghorbani, Namdari	15000	Mohsen Torky	1
31	2009-04-03	Esteghlal	3-0	Malavan	Arash Borhani (32, 36), Fabio Daniel Janavario(79)	Omid Reza Ravankhah	-	20000	Saeed Mozafari Zadeh	1
32	2009-04-12	Foolad	0-0	Esteghlal	-	Mojtaba Jabbari, Siavash Akbarpour	-	30,000	Masoud Moradi	2
33	2009-04-16	Esteghlal	1-1	Saipa	Arash Borhani(88)pen	Fabio Daniel Janavario	-	40,000	Mohsen Ghahremani	2
34	2009-04-26	Payam Mashhad	0-1	Esteghlal	Fabio Daniel Janavario (42)	Pirooz Ghorbani, Omid Reza Ravankhah, Hossain Kazemi	Ebrahim Taghipour	50,000	Alireza Faghani	1

=== Results by round ===
Round	1	2	3	4	5	6	7	8	9	10	11	12	13	14	15	16	17	18	19	20	21	22	23	24	25	26	27	28	29	30	31	32	33	34
Ground	H	A	H	A	H	A	H	H	A	H	A	H	H	A	H	A	H	A	H	A	H	A	H	A	A	H	A	H	A	A	H	A	H	A
Result	W	L	D	L	D	L	W	W	D	W	W	W	W	D	L	W	W	W	W	L	W	W	W	W	W	D	L	W	D	D	W	D	D	W
Position	1	7	6	12	5	17	8	6	7	6	4	3	3	3	3	3	2	1	1	1	1	1	1	1	1	1	1	1	1	1	1	2	2	1

Updated to match(es) played on 26 Apr 2009. Source: "Ipl".
A = Away; H = Home; W = Win; D = Draw; L = Loss

=== Results summary ===
Overall								Home						Away					
Pld	W	D	L	GF	GA	GD	Pts	W	D	L	GF	GA	GD	W	D	L	GF	GA	GD
34	19	9	6	70	34	+36	66	12	4	1	41	14	+27	7	5	5	29	20	+9

Team	Pld	W	D	L	GF	GA	GD	Pts
In Azadi Stadium	20	14	5	1	49	16	+33	47
In Other Stadiums	14	5	4	5	21	18	+3	19

Source: "Ipl".

=== League standings ===
Pos	Team	Pld	W	D	L	GF	GA	GD	Pts	Qualification or relegation
1	Esteghlal (C)	34	19	9	6	70	34	+36	66	Qualification for the 2010 AFC Champions League
2	Zob Ahan	34	19	9	6	58	42	+16	66	Qualification for the 2010 AFC Champions League
3	Mes	34	17	10	7	54	36	+18	61	Qualification for the 2010 AFC Champions League
4	Sepahan	34	14	14	6	46	34	+12	56	Qualification for the 2010 AFC Champions League
5	Persepolis	34	15	10	9	50	41	+9	55	

Updated to match(es) played on 1 September 2018. Source: IPL Stats, Soccerway
Rules for classification: 1) Points; 2) Goal difference; 3) Goals scored.
(C) Champions

=== Top scorers and assists ===
==== Goal scorers ====
20

- (Iran) Arash Borhani

12

- (Iran) Siavash Akbarpour

8

- (Iran) Mojtaba Jabari

6

- (Iran) Hossein Kazemi

5

- (Iran) Pirouz Ghorbani

4

- (Iran) Alireza Abbasfard
- (Brazil) Fábio Januário

3

- (Iran) Farhad Majidi

2

- (Iran) Mehdi Amirabadi

1

- (Iran) Khosro Heydari
- (Iran) Hashem Beikzadeh
- (Iran) Ali Alizadeh
- (Iran) Mehrdad Pooladi

==== Assists ====
8

- (Brazil) Fábio Januário

7

- (Iran) Khosro Heydari

5

- (Iran) Siavash Akbarpour

4

- (Iran) Mojtaba Jabari
- (Iran) Meysam Maniei

3

- (Iran) Ali Alizadeh
- (Iran) Farhad Majidi

2

- (Iran) Yadollah Akbari
- (Iran) Alireza Abbasfard
- (Iran) Hashem Beikzadeh
- (Iran) Arash Borhani

1

- (Iran) Pirouz Ghorbani
- (Iran) Hossein Kazemi
- (Iran) Mehdi Amirabadi
- (Iran) Mehrdad Pooladi

==== Cards ====
Player	Yellow card	Yellow card Red card	Red card
(Iran) Farhad Majidi	4	1	0
(Iran) Siavash Akbarpour	4	0	0
(Iran) Arash Borhani	4	0	0
(Iran) Hossein Kazemi	4	0	0
(Brazil) Fábio Januário	4	0	0
(Iran) Ali Alizadeh	3	0	0
(Iran) Khosro Heydari	3	0	0
(Iran) Mojtaba Jabari	3	0	0
(Iran) Alireza Abbasfard	2	0	0
(Iran) Yadollah Akbari	1	1	0
(Iran) Pirouz Ghorbani	2	0	0
(Iran) Hadi Shakouri	2	0	0
(Iran) Mehdi Amirabadi	2	0	0
(Iran) Hashem Beikzadeh	1	0	0
(Iran) Mehrdad Pooladi	1	0	0
(Iran) Bijan Koshki	1	0	0

==== Matches played ====
29

- (Iran) Vahid Talebloo

28

- (Iran) Pirouz Ghorbani

27

- (Iran) Khosro Heydari

== Hazfi Cup ==
Round	Date	Home	Score	Away	Venue	Goal	Yellow card	Red card	Fans	Ref
Third Round	2008-11-25	Esteghlal	8-1	Damash Gilan	Azadi /Tehran	Arash Borhani (18) (43)pen (66) (69) (89), Ahmad Khaziravi (61)pen, Mehdi Amirabadi (80), Farhad Majidi (90+3)	Ahmad Khaziravi, Fábio Januário	-	2000	Alireza Faghani
1/32	2009-04-30	Mes Rafsanjan	2-2 (5-3)	Esteghlal	Nosh Abad /Rafsanjan	Milad Nouri(25), Ali Alizadeh(30)pen	Mehrdad Pooladi, Farhad Majidi, Mehdi Amirabadi, Yadollah Akbari, Ali Alizadeh	-	6,000	Toraj Haghverdi

=== Bracket ===
Quarterfinals		Semifinals	Finals
Shamoushak	2
Saipa	1	Shamoushak
Shahrdari Tabriz	0	Saba Battery
Saba Battery	1
Malavan	2
Sepahan Novin	1	Malavan
Mes Rafsanjan	2 (5)	Mes Rafsanjan
Esteghlal	2 (3)

=== Scorers ===
==== Goalscorers ====
5

- (Iran) Arash Borhani

1

- (Iran) Ahmad Khaziravi
- (Iran) Mehdi Amirabadi
- (Iran) Farhad Majidi
- (Iran) Milad Nouri
- (Iran) Ali Alizadeh

==== Goalassistants ====
2

- (Iran) Mehdi Amirabadi

1

- (Iran) Ahmad Khaziravi
- (Iran) Meysam Maniei

==== Cards ====
Player	Yellow card	Yellow card Red card	Red card
(Iran) Ahmad Khaziravi	1	0	0
(Iran) Mehrdad Pooladi	1	0	0
(Iran) Farhad Majidi	1	0	0
(Iran) Mehdi Amirabadi	1	0	0
(Iran) Yadollah Akbari	1	0	0
(Iran) Ali Alizadeh	1	0	0
(Brazil) Fábio Januário	1	0	0

== Season statistics ==
Last updated Apr 16 2009

=== Goalscorers ===
26

- (Iran) Arash Borhani

12

- (Iran) Siavash Akbarpour

=== Goalassistants ===
8

- (Brazil) Fábio Januário

== 2009 Asian Champions League ==
=== Group C ===
Pos	Team	Pld	W	D	L	GF	GA	GD	Pts	Qualification	ITT	UMS	JAZ	EST
1	(Saudi Arabia) Al-Ittihad	6	3	3	0	14	4	+10	12	Advance to knockout stage	—	7–0	1–1	2–1
2	(Qatar) Umm-Salal	6	2	2	2	6	13	−7	8	Advance to knockout stage	1–3	—	2–2	1–0
3	(United Arab Emirates) Al-Jazira	6	0	5	1	6	7	−1	5		0–0	0–1	—	2–2
4	(Iran) Esteghlal	6	0	4	2	6	8	−2	4		1–1	1–1	1–1	—

Source: WorldFootball.net

=== Matches ===
2009-03-11 G1	Al-Ittihad (Saudi Arabia)	2 – 1	(Iran) Esteghlal	Jeddah
20:30	Moteab 87'; Aboucherouane 90+3'	Report	Borhani 77'	Stadium: Prince Abdullah al-Faisal Stadium; Attendance: 19,000; Referee: (Japan) Masaaki Iemeto

2009-03-18 G2	Esteghlal (Iran)	1 – 1	(United Arab Emirates) Al-Jazira	Azadi Stadium, Tehran
15:00	Hossein Kazemi 45+4'	report	Fernando Baiano 10'	Attendance: 40,000; Referee: (Uzbekistan) Ravshan Irmatov

2009-04-07 G3	Umm-Salal (Qatar)	1 – 0	(Iran) Esteghlal	Qatar SC Stadium, Doha
19:00	Fábio César 67'	Report		Attendance: 2,521; Referee: (Singapore) Abdul Malik Bashir

2009-04-22 G4	Esteghlal (Iran)	1 – 1	(Qatar) Umm-Salal	Azadi Stadium, Tehran
16:00	Borhani 44'	Report	Ghanem 71'	Attendance: 27,165; Referee: (Oman) Abdullah Al-Hilali

2009-05-05 G5	Esteghlal (Iran)	1 – 1	(Saudi Arabia) Al-Ittihad	Azadi Stadium, Tehran
17:00	Alizadeh 89'	Report	Aboucherouane 80'	Attendance: 15,885; Referee: (Syria) Mohsen Basma

19 May 2009 G6	Al-Jazira (United Arab Emirates)	2 – 2	(Iran) Esteghlal	Al Jazira Mohammed Bin Zayed Stadium, Dubai
20:30 (UTC+4)	Ahmed 49'; Saad 70'	Report	Alizadeh 79'; Shakouri 84'	Attendance: 1,600; Referee: (China) Sun Baojie

=== Top scorers ===
==== Goal scorers ====
2

- (Iran) Arash Borhani
- (Iran) Ali Alizadeh

1

- (Iran) Hossein Kazemi
- (Iran) Hadi Shakouri

==== Assists ====
1

- (Iran) Khosro Heydari
- (Iran) Meysam Maniei

==== Cards ====
Player	Yellow card	Yellow card Red card	Red card
(Iran) Vahid Talebloo	2	0	0
(Iran) Ebrahim Taghipour	2	0	0
(Iran) Hossein Kazemi	1	0	0
(Iran) Khosro Heydari	1	0	0
(Iran) Farhad Majidi	1	0	0
(Iran) Pirouz Ghorbani	1	0	0
(Iran) Bijan Koshki	1	0	0
(Iran) Siavash Akbarpour	1	0	0
(Iran) Hadi Shakouri	1	0	0
(Brazil) Fábio Januário	1	0	0

== 2008/2009 Transfers ==
In:

No.	Position	Player	Age	Fee	From	Transfer Window
4	MF	(Iran) Hossein Kazemi	28	Undisclosed	(Iran) Sepahan F.C.	Summer
6	DF	(Iran) Hadi Shakouri	26	Undisclosed	(Iran) Zob Ahan F.C.	Summer
10	FW	(Iran) Siavash Akbarpour	23	Undisclosed	(United Arab Emirates) Al-Dhafra	Summer
13	DF	(Iran) Ebrahim Taghipour	31	Undisclosed	(Iran) Pegah F.C.	Summer
14	MF	(Iran) Yadollah Akbari	34	Undisclosed	(Iran) PAS F.C.	Summer
15	FW	(Iran) Alireza Abbasfard	26	Undisclosed	(Iran) Saba F.C.	Summer
16	MF	(Iran) Hashem Beikzadeh	24	Undisclosed	(Iran) Moghavemat F.C.	Summer
17	MF	(Brazil) Fábio Januário	28	Undisclosed	(Iran) Foolad F.C.	Summer
21	MF	(Iran) Milad Nouri	22	Undisclosed	(Iran) Steel Azin F.C.	Summer
27	MF	(Iran) Khosro Heydari	24	Undisclosed	(Iran) PAS F.C.	Summer

Out:

No.	Position	Player	Age	Fee	To	Transfer Window
2	DF	(Iran) Amir Hossein Sadeqi	26	Undisclosed	(Iran) Mes F.C.	Summer
4	DF	(Iran) Saeed Lotfi	27	Undisclosed	(Iran) Paykan F.C.	Summer
7	MF	(Iran) Mohammad Navazi	33			Summer
9	FW	(Iran) Mohsen Bayatiniya	28	Undisclosed	(Iran) Saba F.C.	Summer
10	MF	(Iran) Alireza Mansourian	36			
13	MF	(Iran) Mohsen Yousefi		Undisclosed	(Iran) Saba F.C.	Summer
16	DF	(Iran) Hossein Koushki		Undisclosed	(Iran) Payam F.C.	Summer
21	FW	(Iran) Asghar Nadali				Summer
22	FW	(Iran) Hamid Shafiei	27	Undisclosed	(Iran) F.C. Aboomoslem	Summer
25	MF	(Iran) Hossein Ghanbari		Undisclosed	(Iran) PAS F.C.	Summer
30	GK	(Iran) Mahyar Hassan Nejad				Summer
