= 2007–08 Esteghlal F.C. season =

Esteghlal Tehran FC
2007–08 season
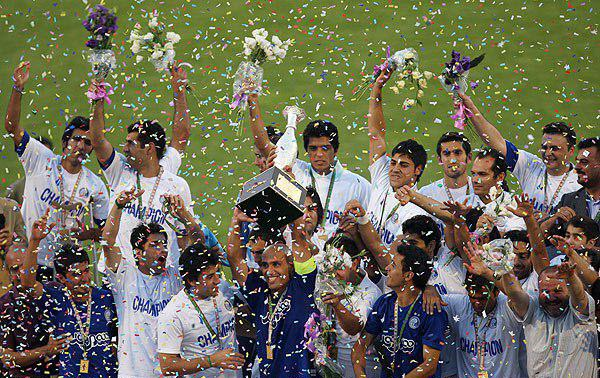
- President: Ali Fatollahzadeh
- Head coach: Nasser Hejazi; Firouz Karimi

This is a list of Esteghlal F.C.'s results for the 2007–08 Season. The club is competing in the Iranian Premier League and Hazfi Cup.

== Squad ==
Last updated Friday, March 11, 2008

Iran Premier League	Hazfi Cup

No.	Position	Name	A(GS)	Minutes	Goal	Yellow card	Yellow card Red card	Red card	A(GS)	Minutes	Goal	Yellow card	Yellow card Red card	Red card
1	GK	(Iran) Vahid Taleblou	22(22)	1980	-24	-	-	-	2(2)	210	-4	-	-	-
2	DF	(Iran) Amir Hossein Sadeghi	17(14)	1377	1	3	-	1	2(1)	105	-	-	-	-
3	DF	(Iran) Mehdi Amirabadi	18(16)	1441	1	3	1	-	2(1)	125	-	-	-	-
4	DF	(Iran) Saeed Lotfi	4(3)	296	-	-	-	-	-	-	-	-	-	-
5	DF	(Iran) Bijan Koshki	12(12)	1055	-	1	-	-	1(1)	120	-	-	-	-
6	MF	(Serbia) Srđan Urošević	8(6)	494	1	2	-	-	1(0)	4	-	-	-	-
7	MF	(Iran) Mohammad Navazi	18(13)	1160	2	5	-	-	2(1)	123	1	-	-	-
8	MF	(Iran) Mojtaba Jabari	18(17)	1376	1	1	-	-	2(2)	210	1	-	-	-
9	FW	(Iran) Mohsen Bayatinia	4(4)	-	-	-	-	-	-	-	-	-	-	-
10	MF	(Iran) Alireza Mansourian (c)	18(8)	783	1	2	-	-	2(2)	172	-	-	-	-
11	MF	(Iran) Meysam Manei	22(17)	1642	3	3	-	-	1(1)	90	-	-	-	-
12	FW	(Iran) Ahmad Khaziravi	2(2)	113	-	1	-	-	-	-	-	-	-	-
13	MF	(Iran) Mohsen Yousefi	11(6)	482	1	1	1	1	2(1)	145	1	-	-	-
14	GK	(Iran) Ashkan Namdari	2(2)	180	-4	-	-	-	-	-	-	-	-	-
16	DF	(Iran) Hossein Koushki	2(2)	71	-	-	-	-	-	-	-	-	-	-
17	FW	(Iran) Arash Borhani	21(19)	1751	6	3	-	-	2(2)	200	2	-	-	-
18	MF	(Iran) Mehrdad Pouladi	21(16)	1445	1	5	1	-	-	-	-	-	-	-
19	FW	(Iran) Ali Alizadeh	15(5)	410	1	-	-	-	-	-	-	-	-	-
20	DF	(Iran) Pirouz Ghorbani	17(17)	1530	2	3	-	-	2(2)	210	-	-	-	-
21	FW	(Iran) Asghar Nadali	5(3)	239	-	-	-	-	-	-	-	-	-	-
22	FW	(Iran) Hamid Shafiei	8(2)	301	1	1	-	-	-	-	-	-	-	-
23	MF	(Iran) Omidreza Ravankhah	22(16)	1616	4	4	-	-	2(1)	130	-	-	-	-
24	MF	(Iran) Hossein Ghanbari	?(?)	?	?	-	-	-	?(?)	?	-	-	-	-
25	MF	(Iran) Saeid Bayat Motlagh	8(8)	701	1	-	-	-	1(1)	120	-	-	-	-
27	FW	(Iran) Farhad Majidi	16(13)	1146	5	5	1	-	2(2)	140	-	-	-	-
30	GK	(Iran) Mahyar Hassan Nejad	-	-	-	-	-	-	-	-	-	-	-	-
33	DF	(Iran) Pezhman Montazeri	22(20)	1836	2	2	1	-	2(2)	206	1	1	-	-

== Transfers ==
In: Note: Flags indicate national team as defined under FIFA eligibility rules; some limited exceptions apply. Players may hold more than one non-FIFA nationality.

No.	Pos.	Nation	Player
6	MF	SRB	Srđan Urošević (from FK Bežanija - Undisclosed Fee)
11	MF	IRN	Meysam Manei (from PAS Tehran - Free Transfer)
9	MF	IRN	Mohsen Bayatinia (from Paykan Tehran)
14	GK	IRN	Ashkan Namdari (from Sanaye Arak)
17	FW	IRN	Arash Borhani (from PAS Tehran - Free Transfer)
18	FW	IRN	Mehrdad Pouladi (from Paykan Tehran)
21	FW	IRN	Asghar Nadali (from Nassaji Mazandaran)
22	FW	IRN	Hamid Shafiei (from Sepahan - Free Transfer)
23	MF	IRN	Omidreza Ravankhah (from Fajr Sepasi)
27	FW	IRN	Farhad Majidi (from Al-Nasr - Free Transfer)
33	DF	IRN	Pejman Montazeri (from Foolad)
16	DF	IRN	Hossein Koshki (from Mersad Shiraz)
5	DF	IRN	Bijan Koshki (from Pas)

Out: Note: Flags indicate national team as defined under FIFA eligibility rules; some limited exceptions apply. Players may hold more than one non-FIFA nationality.

No.	Pos.	Nation	Player
4	DF	IRN	Hossein Kazemi (to Sepahan Contract Expired - Free Transfer)
6	DF	IRN	Mahmoud Fekri (to Shirin Faraz - Contract Expired - Free Transfer)
9	FW	IRN	Siavash Akbarpour (to Al-Dharfa - Contract Expired - Free Transfer)
14	DF	IRN	Morteza Ebrahimi (to Mes Kerman - Contract Expired - Free Transfer)
15	FW	IRN	Farzad Majidi (to Steel Azin Contract Expired - Free Transfer)
16	FW	BRA	Joilson Rodrigues Silva (to Mes Kerman - Contract Expired - Free Transfer)
17	MF	IRN	Meysam Baou (to Al-Shaab - Contract Expired - Free Transfer)
18	FW	IRN	Morteza Hashemizadeh (to Steel Azin)
21	GK	IRN	Mehdi Rahmati (to Mes Kerman - Contract Expired - Free Transfer)
22	MF	IRN	Behshad Yavarzadeh (to Steel Azin - Contract Expired - Free Transfer)
23	DF	GEO	Akvsenti Gilauri (to Pegah Gilan - Contract Expired - Free Transfer)
25	MF	IRN	Bagher Ahmadi (Released)
26	MF	IRN	Asghar Talebnasab (to Shahrdari Bandar Abbas - Contract Expired - Free Transfer)
28	DF	IRN	Ali Ansarian (to Steel Azin for $150,000)

== Persian Gulf Cup ==
No.	Date	Home	Scores	Away	Goal Scorers	Yellow card	Red card	Fans	Rank
1	8/17/2007	Esteghlal F.C.	3 - 2	Esteghlal Ahvaz F.C.	Sadeqi (18), Borhani (49), Maniei (75)	3	-	40,000	5
2	8/23/2007	Malavan F.C.	2 - 1	Esteghlal F.C.	Ghorbani (73)	1	-	14,000	9
3	8/31/2007	Esteghlal F.C.	1 - 1	Mes F.C.	Shafiei (84)	2	1	45,000	8
4	9/6/2007	Shirin Faraz F.C.	1 - 3	Esteghlal F.C.	Borhani (36), Ravankhah (54), Orsovic (86)	2	-	8,000	5
5	9/14/2007	Esteghlal F.C.	1 - 2	Saipa F.C.	Borhani (15)	1	-	60,000	5
6	9/20/2007	Bargh F.C.	1 - 1	Esteghlal F.C.	Jabbari (68)	3	-	20,000	5
7	9/28/2007	Esteghlal F.C.	1 - 1	Saba F.C.	Montazeri (59)	-	-	50,000	9
8	10/7/2007	Sepahan F.C.	2 - 1	Esteghlal F.C.	Ghorbani (75)	4	-	15,000	9
9	10/14/2007	Esteghlal F.C.	1 - 1	Persepolis	Ravankhah (57)	4	-	90,000	11
10	10/19/2007	Pegah F.C.	0 - 1	Esteghlal F.C.	Maniei (12)	2	-	25,000	7
11	10/26/2007	Esteghlal F.C.	1 - 1	F.C. Aboomoslem	Majidi (9)	-	1	50,000	7
12	10/31/2007	Paykan F.C.	3 - 2	Esteghlal F.C.	Navazi (11), Borhani (22)	1	-	30,000	11
13	11/9/2007	Esteghlal F.C.	2 - 1	Rah Ahan F.C.	Majidi (11), (21)	6	1	30,000	9
14	11/15/2007	Fajr F.C.	1 - 2	Esteghlal F.C.	Pooladi (3), Alizadeh (15)	4	1	25,000	6
15	11/30/2007	Esteghlal F.C.	0 - 1	PAS F.C.	-	2	-	35,000	9
16	12/7/2007	Zob Ahan F.C.	0 - 1	Esteghlal F.C.	-	5	-	15,000	7
17	12/14/2007	Esteghlal F.C.	2 - 3	Sanat Naft Abadan F.C.	Majidi (10), Ravankhah (86)	-	1	30,000	8
18	1/22/2008	Esteghlal Ahvaz F.C.	1 - 2	Esteghlal F.C.	Borhani (66), Amirabadi (88)	1	-	20,000	5
19	3/11/2008	Esteghlal F.C.	2 - 0	Malavan F.C.	Montazeri (41), Borhani (79)	-	-	15,000	8
20	2/10/2008	Mes F.C.	1 - 0	Esteghlal F.C.	-	1	-	15,000	8
21	2/17/2008	Esteghlal F.C.	2 - 1	Shirin Faraz F.C.	Majidi (13), Bayat (51)	3	-	10,000	6
22	2/22/2008	Saipa F.C.	0 - 0	Esteghlal F.C.	-	4	1	50,000	6
23	2/29/2008	Esteghlal F.C.	4 - 2	Bragh F.C.		2	-	40,000	5
24	3/5/2008	Saba F.C.	0 - 0	Esteghlal F.C.	-	2	-	15,000	4
25	3/29/2008	Esteghlal F.C.	0 - 1	Sepahan F.C.	-	-	-	55,000	
26	4/4/2008	Persepolis	1 - 1	Esteghlal F.C.	Ravankhah (5)	3	1	80,000	
27	4/11/2008	Esteghlal F.C.	1 - 4	Pegah F.C.	Borhani (51) pen.	2	-	20,000	
28	4/18/2008	F.C. Aboomoslem	2 - 0	Esteghlal F.C.	-	1	-	40,000	
29	4/25/2008	Esteghlal F.C.	1 - 2	Paykan F.C.	Mansourian	-	1	8,000	
30	5/2/2008	Rah Ahan F.C.	0 - 3	Esteghlal F.C.	Majidi (3) pen., Maniei (83), Alizadeh (89)	1	-	10,000	
31	5/5/2008	Esteghlal F.C.	1 - 1	Fajr F.C.	Majidi (47)	-	-	7,000	
32	5/11/2008	PAS F.C.	1 - 1	Esteghlal F.C.	Ravankhah (57)	1	-	8,000	
33	5/11/2008	Esteghlal F.C.	1 - 2	Zob Ahan F.C.	Borhani (92) pen.	1	-	5,000	
34	5/17/2008	Sanat Naft Abadan F.C.	2 - 1	Esteghlal F.C.	Khaziravi (81)	-	-	6,000	13

=== Classification ===
Pos	Team	Pld	W	D	L	GF	GA	GD	Pts	Qualification or relegation
11	Saipa	34	12	9	13	33	35	−2	45	
12	Rah Ahan	34	11	11	12	45	40	+5	44	
13	Esteghlal	34	11	10	13	44	44	0	43	Qualification for 2009 AFC Champions League (Note: Esteghlal qualified to AFC Champions League by winning the Hazfi Cup)
14	Fajr	34	9	15	10	37	41	−4	42	
15	Pegah	34	9	11	14	26	35	−9	38	

Updated to match(es) played on 01 SEP 2018. Source: IPL Stats, Soccerway
Rules for classification: 1) Points; 2) Goal difference; 3) Goals scored.

=== Summary of results ===
Team	Pld	W	D	L	GF	GA	GD	Pts
Host	12	5	4	3	20	16	+4	19
Away	12	5	3	4	14	12	+2	18

Team	Pld	W	D	L	GF	GA	GD	Pts
Azadi Stadium	15	5	6	4	22	19	+3	21
Other Stadiums	9	5	1	3	12	9	+3	16

== Hazfi Cup ==
No.	Step	Date	Home	Scores	Away	Goal Scorers	Yellow Cards	Red Cards	Fans
1	Fourth Round (round of 32)	2007-Nov-23	Esteghlal	5-3	Tarbiat Yazd	Yousefi(23)Borhani(34)Navazi(39)Montazeri(53)Jabari(55)	Montazeri		
2	Fifth Round (round of 16)	2007-Dec-21	Zob Ahan	1-1(3-1)	Esteghlal	Borhani (53) Pen (Navazi, Sadeghi, Borhani)	-	-	12,000
3	Sixth Round (quarterfinals)	Postponed	Rah Ahan		Esteghlal				

== Goalscorers ==
Scorer	IPL	Hazfi Cup
(Iran) Arash Borhani	8	2
(Iran) Farhad Majidi	7	-
(Iran) Omidreza Ravankhah	6	-
(Iran) Meysam Maniei	4	-
(Iran) Pejman Montazeri	2	1
(Iran) Ali Alizadeh	2	-
(Iran) Alireza Mansourian	2	-
(Iran) Pirouz Ghorbani	2	-
(Iran) Mohammad Navazi	1	1
(Iran) Mojtaba Jabbari	1	1
(Iran) Mohsen Yousefi	1	1
(Iran) Ahmad Khaziravi	1	-
(Iran) Amir Hossein Sadeqi	1	-
(Iran) Mehdi Amirabadi	1	-
(Iran) Mehrdad Pouladi	1	-
(Iran) Saeid Bayat Motlagh	1	-
(Iran) Hamid Shafiei	1	-
(Serbia) Srdan Orsovic	1	-
Total goals Scored	43	6

== Assists ==
Assist	League
(Iran) Mojtaba Jabari	8
(Iran) Mohammad Navazi	6
(Iran) Ali Alizadeh	4
(Iran) Meysam Maniei	3
(Iran) Arash Borhani	2
(Iran) Farhad Majidi	2
(Iran) Alireza Mansourian	2
(Iran) Mohsen Yousefi	2
(Iran) Pirouz Ghorbani	1
(Iran) Mehrdad Pouladi	1
(Iran) Omidreza Ravankhah	1
(Iran) Hamid Shafiei	1
Total Goal Assistants	33

Last updated Friday, November 21, 2010
