= Januário =

Brazilian footballer

Fabio Januario
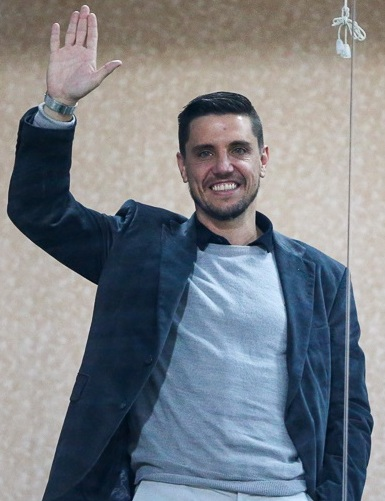
- Januário in 2022

Personal information
- Full name: Fábio Daniel Januário
- Date of birth: September 3, 1979 (age 47)
- Place of birth: Londrina, Paraná, Brazil
- Height: 1.79 m (5 ft 10 1/2 in)
- Position: Midfielder

Youth career
- 1994–1998: Cascavel

Senior career*
| Years | Team | Apps | (Gls) |
| 1998–2001 | Cascavel | 79 | (14) |
| 2002 | CTE Colatina | 25 | (5) |
| 2002 | Vitória | 3 | (1) |
| 2003–2005 | Gil Vicente | 36 | (11) |
| 2005–2007 | Belenenses | 32 | (6) |
| 2007–2008 | Foolad | 34 | (6) |
| 2008–2010 | Esteghlal | 54 | (5) |
| 2010–2012 | Sepahan | 52 | (6) |
| 2012 | Esteghlal | 10 | (2) |
| Total | | 325 | (56) |
- * Club domestic league appearances and goals

Fábio Daniel Januário known simply as Januário (born September 3, 1979 in Londrina, Paraná, Brazil) is a retired Brazilian professional footballer. He played for Esteghlal in the Iran's Premier Football League before being released because of heavy injury. He usually played in the midfielder position.

== Club career ==
Januário began playing club football with Cascavel Esporte Clube while he was studying engineering. After he received his degree, he started his professional career playing for a number of provincial league teams in Brazil before moving the Campeonato Brasileiro Série A team Esporte Clube Vitória. After a season at Esporte Clube Vitória he moved from the Campeonato Brasileira Seria A to the Portuguese Liga where he played for Gil Vicente and C.F. Os Belenenses. He then moved to Iran where he started playing for Foolad in 2006. In 2008, he moved to Esteghlal, talent has dramatically went up and has been in the starting line-up for most of the 2008–09 season and has established great popularity with Esteghlal fans. On 27 April 2009, he netted his fourth goal of the season which eventually made Esteghlal the league champions.

On 26 May 2010, he joined Sepahan in the Iran Pro League with the contract amount of $1,200.000. He returned to Esteghlal after spending two seasons in Sepahan by signing a one-year contract. However, before the season ended, he separated from the team due to foot injury in January 2013. He announced his retirement on 29 June 2013.

| Season | Team | Country | Division | Apps | Goals |
|---|---|---|---|---|---|
| 1998–99 | Cascavel EC | Brazil | 1* | 14 | 6 |
| 1999–00 | Cascavel EC | Brazil | 1* | 19 | 8 |
| 2000–01 | Cascavel EC | Brazil | 1* | 21 | 9 |
| 2001–02 | Cascavel EC | Brazil | 1* | 25 | 13 |
| 2002–03 | CTE Colatina | Brazil | 1** | 18 | 8 |
| 2002–03 | EC Vitória | Brazil | 1 | 0 | 0 |
| 2003–04 | Gil Vicente | Portugal | 1 | 15 | 8 |
| 2004–05 | Gil Vicente | Portugal | 1 | 21 | 5 |
| 2005–06 | Belenenses | Portugal | 1 | 29 | 4 |
| 2006–07 | Belenenses | Portugal | 1 | 3 | 3 |

* 1st Division of Campeonato Paranaense
** 1st Division of Campeonato Capixaba

=== Club career statistics ===
Last update 30 September 2012

| Club performance | | | League | | Cup | | Continental | | Total | |
| Season | Club | League | Apps | Goals | Apps | Goals | Apps | Goals | Apps | Goals |
| Iran | | | League | | Hazfi Cup | | Asia | | Total | |
|---|---|---|---|---|---|---|---|---|---|---|
| 2006–07 | Foolad | Persian Gulf Cup | 13 | 2 | 0 | 0 | - | - | 13 | 2 |
| 2007–08 | Foolad | Azadegan League | 21 | 4 | 3 | 1 | - | - | 24 | 5 |
| 2008–09 | Esteghlal | Persian Gulf Cup | 25 | 4 | 1 | 0 | 5 | 0 | 31 | 4 |
| 2009–10 | Esteghlal | Persian Gulf Cup | 29 | 1 | 1 | 1 | 7 | 0 | 37 | 2 |
| 2010–11 | Sepahan | Persian Gulf Cup | 23 | 1 | 3 | 0 | 8 | 2 | 34 | 3 |
| 2011–12 | Sepahan | Persian Gulf Cup | 29 | 5 | 0 | 0 | 7 | 0 | 36 | 5 |
| 2012–13 | Esteghlal | Persian Gulf Cup | 10 | 2 | 0 | 0 | 0 | 0 | 10 | 2 |
| Total | Iran | | 150 | 19 | 8 | 2 | 27 | 2 | 185 | 23 |
| Career total | | | 150 | 19 | 8 | 2 | 27 | 2 | 185 | 23 |

- Assist goals

| Season | Team | Assists |
|---|---|---|
| 06–07 | Foolad | 5 |
| 07–08 | Foolad | 4 |
| 08–09 | Esteghlal | 1 |
| 09–10 | Esteghlal | 1 |
| 10–11 | Sepahan | 1 |
| 11–12 | Sepahan | 3 |
| 12–13 | Esteghlal | 0 |

== Honours ==
=== Club ===
Esteghlal

- Iran Pro League (1): 2008–09

Sepahan

- Iran Pro League (2): 2010–11, 2011–12
