= Mehran Noorafkan =

Iranian footballer

Personal information
- Full name: Mehran Noorafkan
- Date of birth: 17 November 1986 (age 39)
- Place of birth: Shiraz, Iran
- Height: 1.80 m (5 ft 11 in)
- Position: Defender

Team information
- Current team: Bargh Shiraz
- Number: 19

Youth career
- –2008: Bargh Shiraz

Senior career*
Years	Team	Apps	(Gls)
2009–2010	Esteghlal	1	(0)
2010–	Bargh Shiraz		
2014–2015	Bahman Shiraz		
- * Club domestic league appearances and goals as of 26 March 2010 (UTC) ‡ National team caps and goals as of 26 March 2010

Mehran Noorafkan (born November 17, 1986) is an Iranian footballer who plays for Bargh Shiraz F.C. in the IPL.

== Club career ==
Noorafkan has played with Bargh Shiraz since 2010.

Club performance			League		Cup		Continental		Total	
Season	Club	League	Apps	Goals	Apps	Goals	Apps	Goals	Apps	Goals
Iran			League		Hazfi Cup		Asia		Total	
2009–10	Esteghlal	Persian Gulf Cup	1	0	0	0	0	0	1	0
2010–11	Bargh Shiraz	Azadegan League					-	-		
Total	Iran		1	0	0	0	0	0	1	0
Career total			1	0	0	0	0	0	1	0

- Assists

Season	Team	Assists
09/10	Esteghlal	0
