= Hashem Beikzadeh =

Iranian footballer (born 1984)

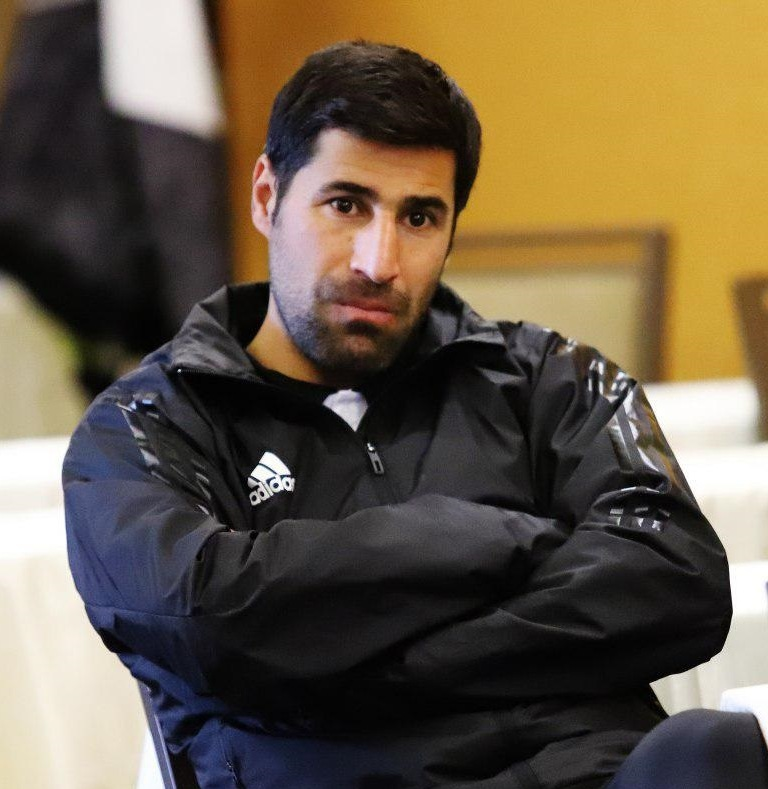
- Beikzadeh in 2019

Personal information
- Full name: Mohammad-Hashem Beikzadeh
- Date of birth: January 22, 1984 (age 42)
- Place of birth: Tehran, Iran
- Height: 1.82 m (6 ft 0 in)
- Position: Left back

Team information
- Current team: Baadraan Tehran F.C. (assistant coach)

Senior career*
Years	Team	Apps	(Gls)
2004–2008	Fajr Sepasi	78	(15)
2008–2010	Esteghlal	36	(1)
2010–2012	Sepahan	50	(1)
2012–2015	Esteghlal	62	(2)
2015	Saba Qom	13	(0)
2015–2016	Zob Ahan	7	(0)
2016–2017	Saba Qom	12	(0)
2017	Tractor Sazi	3	(0)
2017–2018	Naft Talaieh	15	(1)
2018–2019	Sorkhpooshan Pakdasht	4	(0)
2019	Baadraan	5	(1)
Total		285	(21)

International career
2006–2016	Iran	20	(1)

Managerial career
- 2020-: Baadraan Tehran F.C. (assistant coach)
- * Club domestic league appearances and goals

Hashem Beikzadeh (Persian: هاشم بیک زاده, born January 22, 1984, in Tehran) is a former Iranian football defender and assistant coach of Baadraan Tehran F.C.

== Club career ==
Beikzadeh is a product of the Fajr Sepasi youth academy and since his promotion to the first team squad for the 2005/06 season has been one of Fajr's most important and influential players. He moved to Esteghlal and won the league in his first season but did not play in many matches. On 8 July 2014, Beikzadeh signed a contract extension with Esteghlal, keeping him at the club until 2016. On 26 July 2015, he joined Saba Qom after terminating his contract with Esteghlal.

=== Club career statistics ===
As of 4 June 2015

Club performance			League		Cup		Continental		Total	
Season	Club	League	Apps	Goals	Apps	Goals	Apps	Goals	Apps	Goals
Iran			League		Hazfi Cup		Asia		Total	
2004–05	Fajr	Iran Pro League	1	0	^{1}	^{1}	–	–	1^{1}	0^{1}
2005–06	Fajr	Iran Pro League	28	3	^{1}	^{1}	–	–	28^{1}	3^{1}
2006–07	Fajr	Iran Pro League	24	5	^{1}	^{1}	–	–	24^{1}	5^{1}
2007–08	Fajr	Iran Pro League	25	6	^{1}	^{1}	–	–	25^{1}	6^{1}
2008–09	Esteghlal	Iran Pro League	12	1	1	0	5	0	18	1
2009–10	Esteghlal	Iran Pro League	24	0	1	0	2	0	27	0
2010–11	Sepahan	Iran Pro League	24	1	2	0	4	0	30	1
2011–12	Sepahan	Iran Pro League	26	0	0	0	0	0	26	0
2012–13	Esteghlal	Iran Pro League	21	0	1	0	7	1	29	1
2013–14	Esteghlal	Iran Pro League	18	1	3	0	8	0	29	1
2014–15	Esteghlal	Iran Pro League	23	1	1	0	0	0	24	1
2015–16	Saba Qom	Iran Pro League	13	0	2	0	-	-	15	0
2015–16	Zob Ahan	Iran Pro League	7	0	0	0	4	1	11	1
Total	Iran		232	18	9^{1}	0^{1}	29	2	267^{1}	19^{1}
Career total			232	18	9^{1}	0^{1}	29	2	267^{1}	19^{1}

^{1} Statistics Incomplete.

- Assist Goals

Season	Team	Assists
2005–06	Fajr	4
2006–07	Fajr	5
2007–08	Fajr	3
2008–09	Esteghlal	2
2010–11	Sepahan	1
2011–12	Sepahan	3
2012–13	Esteghlal	2
2013–14	Esteghlal	4

== International career ==
He debuted for the Iran national team, known as Team Melli, in August 2006 in a friendly match against UAE. Beikzadeh was again called up to Team Melli for the West Asian Football Federation Championship 2007 held in Amman, Jordan. He scored his first goal for Iran on June 24, 2007, in a 2–1 final match win versus Iraq. He was called up again for 2010 FIFA World Cup qualifying, and played against Kuwait as a left back. On 1 June 2014, he was called into Iran's 2014 FIFA World Cup squad by Carlos Queiroz. He was an unused substitute in the tournament, losing his spot to Mehrdad Pooladi because of injury. He was called into Iran's 2015 AFC Asian Cup squad on 30 December 2014 by Queiroz. He was replaced by Mohammad Reza Khanzadeh due to injury days before the first match in Australia.

=== International goals ===
Scores and results list Iran's goal tally first.

#	Date	Venue	Opponent	Score	Result	Competition
1	June 24, 2007	Amman International Stadium, Amman	Iraq	2–0	2–1	West Asian Football Federation Championship 2007

== Personal life ==
He is married and has two daughters, Beikzadeh is originally Iranian Azerbaijani from Ardabil Province.

== Honours ==
Esteghlal

- Iran Pro League (2): 2008–09, 2012–13

Sepahan

- Iran Pro League (2): 2010–11, 2011–12

Zob Ahan

- Hazfi Cup (1): 2015–16
