= Hossein Koushki =

Iranian footballer

Personal information
- Full name: Hossein Koushki
- Date of birth: 22 May 1984 (age 42)
- Place of birth: Marvdasht, Iran
- Position: Right back

Youth career
- 2005–2007: Esteghlal Tehran

Senior career*
Years	Team	Apps	(Gls)
2007–2008	Esteghlal Tehran	1	(0)
2008–2009	Payam Khorasan	16	(1)
2009–2011	Rah Ahan Tehran	36	(1)
2011–2012	Bargh Shiraz	12	(2)
2012–2013	Damash Gilan	26	(0)
2013–2015	Naft Abadan	16	(0)
2016–2016	Saba Qom	10	(0)
2016–2017	Qashqai Shiraz	15	(0)
- * Club domestic league appearances and goals as of 06 June 2013 (UTC) ‡ National team caps and goals as of 17 May 2010

Hossein Koushki (born 22 May 1984) is an Iranian footballer who played in the IPL.

== Club career ==
Koushki joined Rah Ahan in 2009 after spending the previous season at Payam Mashhad F.C. He was released by Damash on last days of December 2012.

=== Club career statistics ===
As of 19 December 2012

Club performance			League		Cup		Continental		Total	
Season	Club	League	Apps	Goals	Apps	Goals	Apps	Goals	Apps	Goals
Iran			League		Hazfi Cup		Asia		Total	
2007–08	Esteghlal	Pro League	1	0		0	-	-		0
2008–09	Payam	Pro League	16	1			-	-		
2009–10	Rah Ahan	Pro League	20	1			-	-		
2010–11	Rah Ahan	Pro League	16	0	1	0	-	-	19	0
2011–12	Bargh Shiraz	Division 1	12	2	0	0	-	-	12	0
2011–12	Damash	Pro League	13	0	0	0	-	-	13	0
2012–13	Damash	Pro League	13	0	1	0	-	-	14	0
Total	Iran		91	4			0	0		
Career total			91	4			0	0		

- Assist Goals

Season	Team	Assists
09–10	Rah Ahan	1
10–11	Rah Ahan	0

== Personal ==
Koushki is the younger brother of Mes Kerman player Bijan Koushki.
