= Márcio Giovanini =

Brazilian-Italian footballer

Personal information
- Full name: Márcio Fabiano Giovanini
- Date of birth: 17 October 1978 (age 48)
- Place of birth: Londrina, Paraná, Brazil
- Height: 1.88 m (6 ft 2 in)
- Position: Central defender

Senior career*
Years	Team	Apps	(Gls)
2000–2001	Malutrom	2	(0)
2001–2002	1. FC Saarbrücken	18	(0)
2002–2004	Fortaleza	14	(0)
2004–2005	Maccabi Tel Aviv	17	(0)
2005	Charleroi	1	(0)
2005–2006	Naval 1º de Maio		
2006–2007	Maccabi Petah Tikva	22	(0)
2007–2008	Maccabi Herzliya	12	(0)
2008–2009	Veria	11	(1)
2009	Campinense	4	(0)
2009–2010	Mes Kerman	25	(2)
2011	Navibank Saigon		
- * Club domestic league appearances and goals

Márcio Fabiano Giovanini (born 17 October 1978) is a Brazilian-Italian former footballer.

== Career ==
Giovanini has played in Brazil, Germany, Israel, Belgium, Portugal, Greece and now in Vietnam.

In January 2009, Giovanini went on trial with Birmingham City F.C.

He moved to Mes in summer 2009. In January 2011, he moved to Navibank Saigon F.C.
