= Srđan Urošević =

Serbian footballer

Personal information
- Full name: Srđan Urošević
- Date of birth: 30 April 1984 (age 42)
- Place of birth: Belgrade, SFR Yugoslavia
- Height: 1.92 m (6 ft 3 1/2 in)
- Position: Defensive midfielder

Youth career
- Red Star Belgrade

Senior career*
Years	Team	Apps	(Gls)
2003–2005	Bežanija	53	(3)
2005–2006	Obilić	8	(0)
2006–2007	Bežanija	4	(1)
2007	→ Zemun (loan)	14	(0)
2007–2008	Esteghlal	8	(1)
2008–2010	Ham-Kam	15	(1)
2010–2011	Ilioupoli	24	(2)
2011–2012	Sektzia Ness Ziona	1	(0)
2012	Smederevo	1	(0)
2013	Slavija Sarajevo	2	(0)
Total		130	(8)
- * Club domestic league appearances and goals as of 21:36, 15 September 2012 (UTC)

Srđan Urošević (Serbian Cyrillic: Cpђaн Уpoшeвић; born 30 April 1984) is a Serbian retired football midfielder.

== External sources ==
- Profile at Srbijafudbal
- Srđan Urošević at Soccerway (archived)
- Srđan Urošević at the Norwegian Football Federation (in Norwegian)
