= Farhad Majidi =

Iranian coach and retired footballer (born 1972)

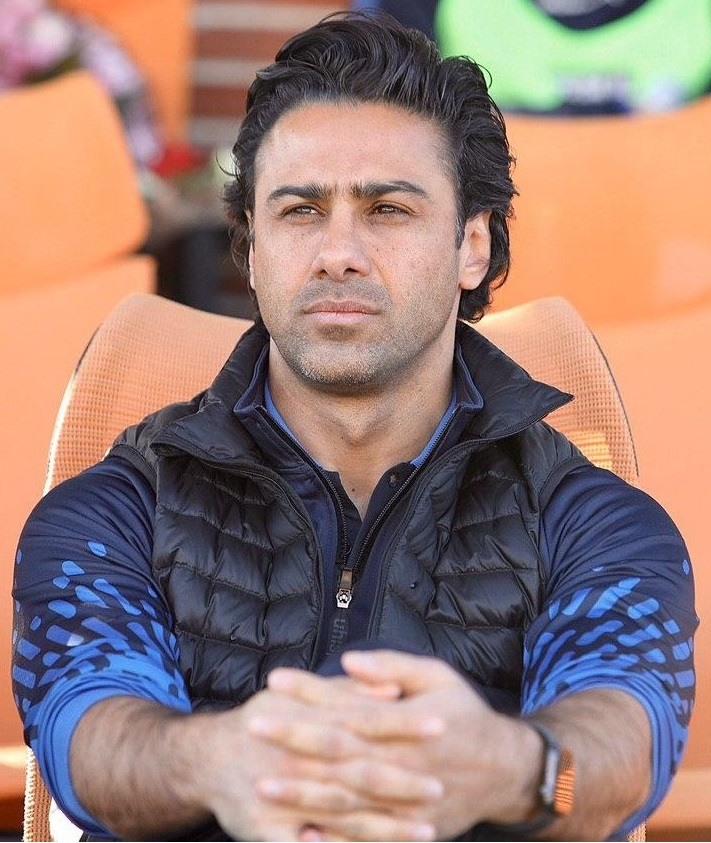
- Farhad Majidi with Esteghlal Tehran at Dec. 2021

Personal information
- Full name: Farhad Majidi
- Date of birth: 3 June 1976 (age 50)
- Place of birth: Tehran, Iran
- Height: 1.76 m (5 ft 9 1/2 in)
- Positions: Attacking midfielder; striker

Youth career
- Parchin Industries
- Keshavarz
- Bahman

Senior career*
Years	Team	Apps	(Gls)
1995–1997	Bahman		
1997–2000	Esteghlal		
2000	→ Rapid Wien (loan)	12	(2)
2000–2006	Al-Wasl Dubai		(68)
2003	→ Al-Ain (loan)	11	(1)
2006	→ Al-Ahli (loan)		(6)
2006–2007	Al-Nasr Dubai	11	(4)
2007	→ Al-Ahli Dubai (loan)	8	(2)
2007–2013	Esteghlal	159	(67)
2011–2012	→ Al Gharrafa (loan)	13	(7)

International career
1996–2011	Iran	45	(10)

Managerial career
- 2018–2019: Espanyol-U16 (assistant)
- 2018–2019: Esteghlal (assistant)
- 2019: Esteghlal (interim)
- 2019: Iran U23
- 2019–2020: Esteghlal
- 2021–2022: Esteghlal
- 2022–2024: Al-Ittihad Kalba
- 2025–2026: Al Bataeh
- 2026–: Iran
- * Club domestic league appearances and goals

Farhad Majidi (Persian: فرهاد مجیدی; born 3 June 1976) is an Iranian football coach and former player who most recently manages Al Bataeh Club.

He mostly played as attacking midfielder for Esteghlal when he was a football player. He scored 2 important goal for AlAin at 2002–03 AFC Champions League

== Club career ==
Having played for Esteghlal Tehran for several seasons, Majidi's performance attracted Rapid Vienna to recruit him for one season. However, the offer for a permanent transfer to Austria was not accepted by the Austrians, and they released Majidi who joined Al-Wasl in the UAE.

In the UAE League and in combination with his compatriot Alireza Vahedi Nikbakht, Majidi scored a handful of goals and topped the league chart with Al Wasl. Majidi was unlucky with injuries and was out of action for quite a few matches. One of the highlights of Majidi's career was his short loan to Al-Ain. Majidi was the star of the 2002–03 AFC Champions League semi-final game against Dalian Shide. His goal helped Al Ain to reach the AFC Champions League final match, eventually winning the trophy for the first time in the club's history.

All together in the five years Majidi played for Al Wasl FC, he scored over 100 goals. He left Al Wasl in 2006, joining another UAE club, Al-Nasr.

On 10 February 2007, Majidi signed a contract until the end of the season with Al-Ahli. At the end of the season, Majidi signed a season-long contract with Esteghlal tehran. He extended his contract with Esteghlal tehran for two more season and he was mostly used as the attacking midfielder in 2008–09 season which ended up in winning the league. He had a very good season in 2009–10 season where he was the top scorer of the team and one of the top scorers of ACL.

On 21 December 2011, Majidi left Esteghlal due to personal problems and joined the Qatari side Al Gharrafa. He played until the end of the season at Al Gharafa and his contract was expired on 1 July 2012. Majidi announced his retirement from football on 28 September 2012 after Esteghlal refused to offer him a contract extension. but upon request of Esteghlal fans and management, he later withdrew his decision and rejoined the team with an 18-months contract on 18 December 2012. He then won the league title with the team and scored six goals. Finally, Majidi retired for the second time as a football player on 29 October 2013 after Esteghlal was unable to qualified to the finals of the 2013 AFC Champions League.

== International career ==
He made his debut for Iran national football team in December 1996 in the 1996 Asian Cup match against Saudi Arabia. He was occasionally getting called up but never became a regular starter till the arrival of Branko Ivankovic where he was experiencing the top of his football. He was mostly benched by Ivankovic because of Ali Daei and Arash Borhani and decided to leave Team Melli camp in 2004 just before the 2004 AFC Asian Cup where Iran lost the 2006 FIFA World Cup qualification match against Jordan in Tehran and he was benched for the whole match. Before the 2006 FIFA World Cup, he was called for a few friendlies but could not break it through to the tournament. Majidi was invited by Amir Ghalenoei and Afshin Ghotbi in 2006 and 2009 for the 2007 AFC Asian Cup qualification and 2011 AFC Asian Cup qualification for a couple of matches and was used as the substitute. He was called for few friendlies three months before 2011 AFC Asian Cup but decided to announce his retirement. Majidi was again invited on 23 August 2011 by Carlos Queiroz. He was the oldest player in the Iran national team since he had been a member of the team since 1996, however Majidi does not have many international caps. Farhad Majidi and the Persepolis captain, Ali Karimi, were considered two of the fans' favorite players during the 2014 FIFA World Cup qualification. On 27 September 2011, Majidi announced his retirement from national playing.

== Personal life ==
On 11 January 2026, Majidi publicly supported the 2025–2026 Iranian protests on his Instagram by criticizing the Iranian government's internet blackout, stating, "Iran's internet has been shut down, but the voices can still be heard." On 24 January, he said, "The religious leaders destroyed the celebrations and looted the country's money, and this is what happened to us. Condolences to all the people of my country, Iran." Majidi also reposted a video on his Instagram of an elderly individual reciting poetry describing the Islamic Republic's destruction of Iran, saying, "If there is no art and freedom in a society, violence will take its place. Art, freedom, and literacy have been eliminated from our country for years."

== Club statistics ==
Club performance			League		Cup		Continental		Total	
Season	Club 50 League	Apps 20 Goals	Apps 10 Goals	Apps 15 Goals	Apps 13 Goals					
Iran			League		Hazfi Cup		Asia		Total	
1995–96	Bahman	Azadegan League	Unknown							
1996–97	Bahman	Azadegan League	Unknown							
Total			Unknown							7
1997–98	Esteghlal	Azadegan League	Unknown							
1998–99	Esteghlal	Azadegan League	Unknown							
1999–00	Esteghlal	Azadegan League	Unknown							
2000–01	Esteghlal	Azadegan League	Unknown						6	Unknown
Austria			League		Austrian Cup		Europe		Total	
1999–00	Rapid Wien (loan)	Bundesliga	12	2	0	0	0	0	12	2
United Arab Emirates			League		President's Cup		Asia		Total	
2000–01	Al Wasl	UAE Pro League	Unknown	14	Unknown		–		Unknown	
2001–02	Al Wasl	UAE Pro League	Unknown	11	Unknown		–		Unknown	25
2002–03	Al Wasl	UAE Pro League	Unknown	12	Unknown	6	–		Unknown	18
2003–04	Al Wasl	UAE Pro League	Unknown	14	Unknown		–		Unknown	
2004–05	Al Wasl	UAE Pro League	Unknown	14	Unknown		–		Unknown	
2005–06	Al Wasl	UAE Pro League	Unknown	3	Unknown	⩾4	–		Unknown	⩾7
Total			Unknown	68	Unknown					108
2002–03	Al Ain (loan)	UAE Pro League	–				4	1	4	1
2005–06	Al Ahli (loan)	UAE Pro League	Unknown	6	Unknown		–		Unknown	
2006–07	Al Nasr	UAE Pro League	11	2	Unknown		–		Unknown	4
2006–07	Al Ahli (loan)	UAE Pro League	8	1	Unknown		–		Unknown	
Iran			League		Hazfi Cup		Asia		Total	
2007–08	Esteghlal	Persian Gulf League	22	7	6	2	–		28	9
2008–09	Esteghlal	Persian Gulf League	23	3	2	1	5	0	30	4
2009–10	Esteghlal	Persian Gulf League	30	11	1	1	6	5	37	17
2010–11	Esteghlal	Persian Gulf League	26	10	2	1	6	5	34	16
2011–12	Esteghlal	Persian Gulf League	16	9	2	0	0	0	18	9
Qatar			League		Emir of Qatar Cup		Asia		Total	
2011–12	Al-Gharafa	Qatar Stars League	13	7	3	1	5	0	21	8
Iran			League		Hazfi Cup		Asia		Total	
2012–13	Esteghlal	Persian Gulf League	11	3	1	0	10	3	22	6
2013–14	Esteghlal	Persian Gulf League	10	4	0	0	0	0	10	4
Total	Iran									
Total	Austria		12	2	0	0	0	0	12	2
Total	United Arab Emirates									
Total	Qatar									
Career total										

- Assists

Season	Team	Assists
07–08	Esteghlal	2
08–09	Esteghlal	3
09–10	Esteghlal	2
10–11	Esteghlal	5
11–12	Esteghlal	9
11–12	Al-Gharafa	5
12–13	Esteghlal	1
13–14	Esteghlal	1

=== International goals ===
Scores and results list Iran's goal tally first.

#	Date	Venue	Opponent	Score	Result	Competition
1	4 June 1997	Abbasiyyin Stadium, Damascus, Syria	Kyrgyzstan	4–0	7–0	1998 FIFA World Cup qualification
2	4 June 1997	Abbasiyyin Stadium, Damascus, Syria	Kyrgyzstan	7–0	7–0	1998 FIFA World Cup qualification
3	16 August 2000	Azadi Stadium, Tehran, Iran	Georgia	2–1	2–1	Friendly
4	1 September 2000	Ernst-Happel-Stadion, Vienna, Austria	Austria	1–0	1–5	Friendly
5	24 November 2000	Takhti Stadium, Tabriz, Iran	Guam	1–0	19–0	2002 FIFA World Cup qualification
6	24 November 2000	Takhti Stadium, Tabriz, Iran	Guam	16–0	19–0	2002 FIFA World Cup qualification
7	24 November 2000	Takhti Stadium, Tabriz, Iran	Guam	18–0	19–0	2002 FIFA World Cup qualification
8	17 November 2002	Sabah Al Salem Stadium, Kuwait City, Kuwait	Kuwait	3–1	3–1	Friendly
9	26 September 2003	Al-Hassan Stadium, Amman, Jordan	Jordan	2–2	2–3	2004 AFC Asian Cup qualification
10	21 June 2004	Azadi Stadium, Tehran, Iran	Syria	7–1	7–1	2004 WAFF Championship

== Managerial statistics ==
As of 29 February 2024

Team	From	To	Record							
Team	From	To	G	W	D	L	GF	GA	GD	Win %
Esteghlal (caretaker)	29 April 2019	1 June 2019	5	3	2	0	9	5	+4	60.00
Iran U23	10 June 2019	6 October 2019	2	0	0	2	1	5	−4	0.00
Esteghlal	2 January 2020	5 September 2020	21	10	7	4	38	22	+16	47.62
Esteghlal	3 March 2021	1 June 2022	59	35	17	7	75	32	+43	59.32
Kalba	4 June 2022	2 March 2024	53	16	13	24	83	92	−9	30.19
Al Bataeh	13 January 2025	present	26	7	7	12	26	34	−8	26.92
Total coaching for Esteghlal			85	48	26	11	124	57	+67	56.47
Total			166	71	46	49	227	179	+48	42.77

- The result of wins and losses on penalties is calculated in the statistics of wins and losses.

== Honours ==
=== Player ===
==== Club ====
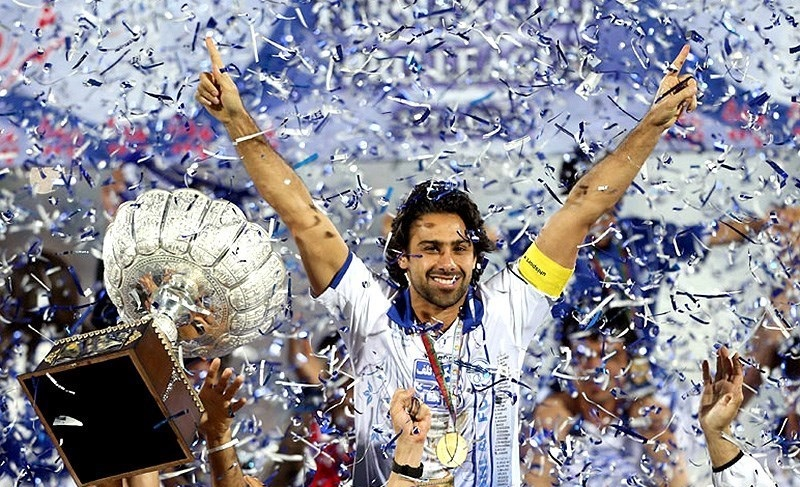
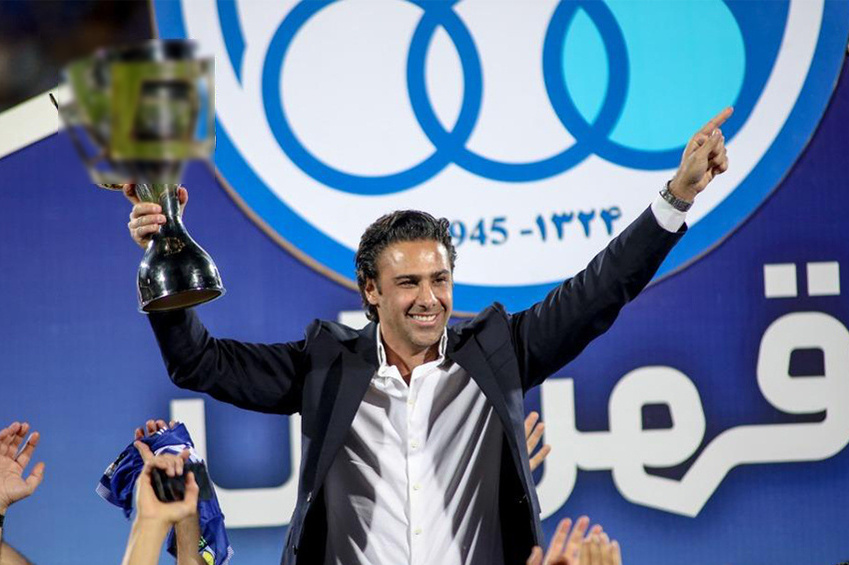
Farhad Majidi has won the Persian Gulf Pro League as the captain and head coach of Esteghlal.

Esteghlal

- Persian Gulf Pro League: 1997–98, 2008–09, 2012–13
- Hazfi Cup: 2007–08
- AFC Champions League runner-up: 1998–99
- AFC Champions League semi final:2013

Al-Ain

- AFC Champions League: 2002–03

Al-Ahli

- UAE Football League: 2005–06

Al-Gharafa

- Emir of Qatar Cup: 2012

==== National ====
Iran

- WAFF Championship: 2004

=== Manager ===
Esteghlal

- Persian Gulf Pro League: 2021–22
- Hazfi Cup runner-up: 2019–20, 2020–21
