= Mahyar Hassan-Nejad =

Iranian footballer (born 1985)

Personal information
- Full name: Mahyar Hassan Nejad Hamidi
- Date of birth: 6 August 1985 (age 41)
- Place of birth: Sari, Iran
- Position: Goalkeeper

Team information
- Current team: Sanat Sari
- Number: 1

Youth career
- 2000–2002: Olympic Sari
- 2002–2004: Fajr Tehran

Senior career*
Years	Team	Apps	(Gls)
2004–2006	Saipa	1	(0)
2006–2008	Esteghlal	0	(0)
2008–2009	Shamoushak		(0)
2009–2010	Damash Iranian		(0)
2010–	Sanat Sari	43	(0)
- * Club domestic league appearances and goals as of 2 September 2010 (UTC) ‡ National team caps and goals as of 17 May 2010

Mahyar Hassan-Nejad (Persian: مهیار حسن نژاد, August 6, 1985 in Sari, Iran) is an Iranian footballer who currently plays for Sanat Sari in the Azadegan League.

== Club career ==
Hassan-Nejad joined Sanat Sari in 2010–11 season.

=== Club career statistics ===
As of 13 December 2011

Club performance			League		Cup		Continental		Total	
Season	Club	League	Apps	Goals	Apps	Goals	Apps	Goals	Apps	Goals
Iran			League		Hazfi Cup		Asia		Total	
2005–06	Saipa	Iran Pro League	1	0		0	-	-		0
2006–07	Esteghlal	Iran Pro League	0	0	0	0	-	-	0	0
2007–08	Esteghlal	Iran Pro League	0	0	0	0	-	-	0	0
2010–11	Sanat Sari	Azadegan League	25	0	0	0	-	-	25	0
2011–12	Sanat Sari	Azadegan League	18	0	0	0	-	-	18	0
Total	Iran		44	0		0	0	0		0
Career total			44	0		0	0	0		0
