= Mehrdad Pooladi =

Iranian footballer (born 1987)

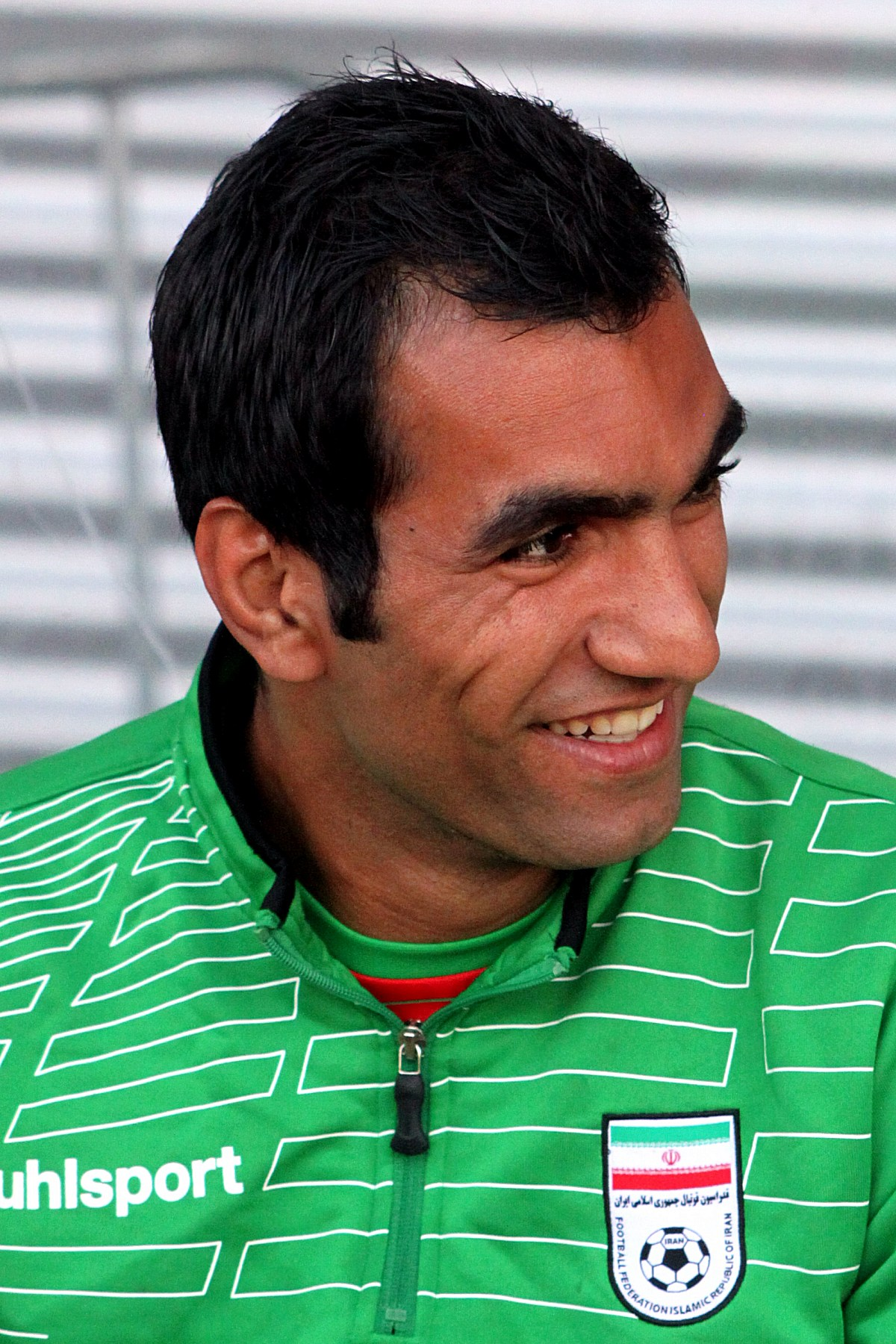
- Pooladi with Iran in 2014

Personal information
- Full name: Mehrdad Pooladi
- Date of birth: 26 February 1987 (age 39)
- Place of birth: Karaj, Iran
- Height: 1.81 m (5 ft 11 in)
- Positions: Left-back; midfielder

Youth career
- 2002–2006: Paykan

Senior career*
Years	Team	Apps	(Gls)
2006–2007	Paykan	18	(2)
2007–2009	Esteghlal	37	(1)
2009–2010	Tractor Sazi	30	(6)
2010–2012	Mes Kerman	41	(3)
2012	→ Persepolis (loan)	0	(0)
2012–2014	Persepolis	30	(0)
2014–2017	Al-Shahania	62	(5)
2017–2019	Bangkok United	10	(1)
2019–2020	Al-Kharitiyath	21	(0)
2020-2021	Muaither	0	(0)

International career^{‡}
2005–2006	Iran U20	8	(0)
2006–2007	Iran U23	5	(0)
2011–2015	Iran	29	(0)
Medal record
Representing Iran
Asian Games
Bronze medal – third place	2006 Qatar	Team competition
- * Club domestic league appearances and goals as of 07:53, 9 October 2018 (UTC) ‡ National team caps and goals as of 23 January 2015

Mehrdad Pooladi (Persian: مهرداد پولادی; born 26 February 1987) is an Iranian former professional footballer. He was also an Iranian international, where he played as a left back.

Pooladi is a utility player, formerly playing as a forward and attacking midfielder in his youth and playing regularly as a full back, defensive midfielder and winger.

== Club career ==
=== Esteghlal ===
In August 2007, Pooladi moved from Paykan to Esteghlal as one of the number of young players that were chosen by coach Naser Hejazi. He scored his only goal in Estghlal's 2–1 away at Moghavemat Sepasi. After Hejazi was sacked and replaced with Firouz Karimi, he fell down in the pecking order and eventually left Esteghlal two years after joining the team.

=== Tractor Sazi ===
Pooladi joined Tractor Sazi for the 2008–09 season where he played only for a single season. In Tabriz he managed to regain his form playing mostly as a central midfielder, scoring six goals in the season. The most noteworthy was a 40-yard free-kick against his former team Esteghlal in the Azadi Stadium.

=== Mes Kerman ===
Pooladi transferred to Mes Kerman and played for the team for a year and a half, again mostly as a midfielder. In the mid-season of 2011–12, he was not included in Miroslav Blažević's squad and left the team.

=== Persepolis ===
In January 2012, Pooladi moved to Persepolis, Pooladi could not play in 2011–12 season as he had missed the transfer deadline day. He was however able to register for the 2012 AFC Champions League playing in 7 games and scoring a goal against Al-Shabab from a free-kick in a 3–1 win. He extended his contract with Persepolis for two years, keeping him in the team until 2014. He has established himself as a fan favorite due to the high intensity at which he plays the game. Since he joined Persepolis he played the majority of the games as a left back, occasionally slotting in as a defensive midfielder and left wing. After a good showing in the 2014 FIFA World Cup, he was monitored by Premier League clubs such as Southampton, Hull City and Swansea City. On 17 September 2014, the FFIRI disciplinary committee announced a sentence on his contract with Persepolis for the forthcoming 2014–15 season due to conscription issues. According to this sentence, the contract is cancelled after the end of the 2013–14 season (in May 2014), therefore he became a free agent and was free to choose his club.

=== Al-Shahania ===
Pooladi officially joined coach Miguel Ángel Lotina's Qatari side Al-Shahania with a two-year contract after IFF's rule that he is a free agent due to conscription issues. On 5 December 2014, he provided an assist to Masoud Shojaei. He also scored a 35–yard free kick for them towards the end of the season.

=== Bangkok United ===
In June 2017, Pooladi joined Bangkok United Football Club - a Thai professional football club based in Pathum Thani.

== International career ==
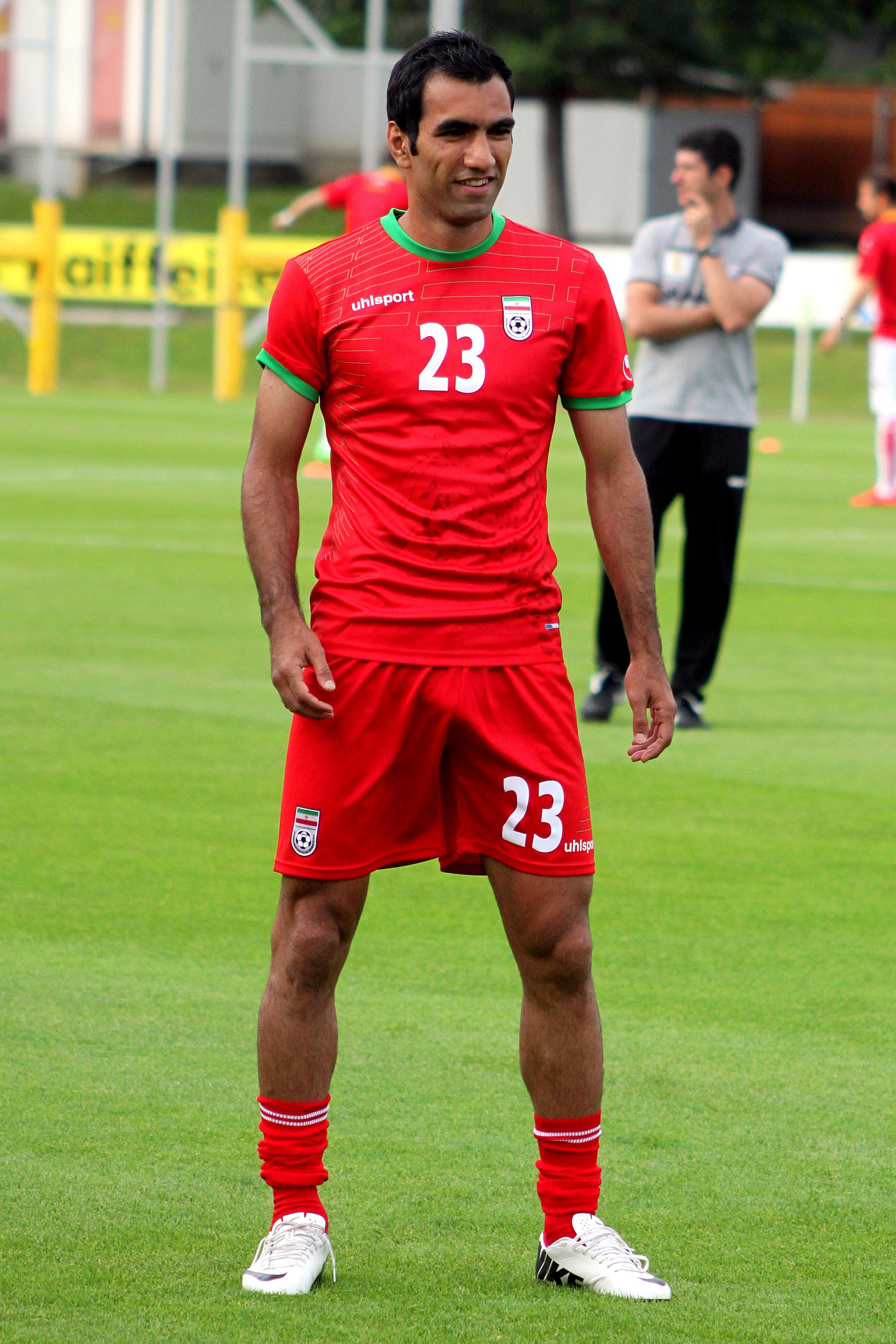
Pooladi in 2014

Pooladi played all three games for Iran U20 at 2006 AFC Youth Championship, as a product of Paykan Tehran. He also made five appearances in 2005 in Valentin A.Granatkin Memorial – International Youth Tournament for Iran U20. He was also a member of Iran U-23, participating in the 2006 Asian Games.

He started his senior international career under Carlos Queiroz in July 2011 against Madagascar. Queiroz moved Pooladi to the left back position a position and Pooladi has taken the opportunity and established himself as first choice left back ever since.

=== 2014 FIFA World Cup ===
On 1 June 2014, he was called into Iran's 2014 FIFA World Cup squad by Queiroz. Pooladi was named as the second best-ranked player in the first week of the tournament behind Thomas Müller by FIFA, after receiving 9.7 points in the opening match against Nigeria. He also showed a good performance in the next match against Argentina. In second half time he dribbled well Higuain and Messi to shows his technical ability.

=== 2015 Asian Cup ===
He was called into Iran's 2015 AFC Asian Cup squad on 30 December 2014 by Queiroz. On 23 January 2015, he received a controversial red card in the quarter-final of the competition against Iraq from referee Ben Williams.

== Career statistics ==
As of 9 August 2018

Appearances and goals by club, season and competition
Club	Season	League			Cup		Asia		Total	
Club	Season	Division	Apps	Goals	Apps	Goals	Apps	Goals	Apps	Goals
Paykan	2006–07	Pro League	18	2	2	0	–	–	20	2
Esteghlal	2007–08	Pro League	28	1	1	0	–	–	29	1
Esteghlal	2008–09	Pro League	9	0	2	0	0	0	11	0
Esteghlal	Total		37	1	3	0	0	0	40	1
Tractor Sazi	2009–10	Pro League	30	6	0	0	–	–	30	6
Mes	2010–11	Pro League	28	0	1	0	–	–	29	0
Mes	2011	Pro League	13	3	1	0	–	–	14	3
Mes	Total		41	3	2	0	0	0	43	3
Persepolis	2012	Pro League	0	0	0	0	7	1	7	1
Persepolis	2012–13	Pro League	22	0	3	0	–	–	25	0
Persepolis	2013–14	Pro League	4	0	1	0	–	–	5	0
Persepolis	Total		26	0	4	0	7	1	37	1
Al-Shahania	2014–15	Qatar Stars League	20	2	1	1	–	–	21	3
Al-Shahania	2015–16	Second Division	23	3	0	0	–	–	23	3
Al-Shahania	2016–17	Qatar Stars League	19	0	1	0	–	–	20	0
Al-Shahania	Total		62	5	2	1	0	0	64	6
Bangkok United	2017	Thai League 1	4	0	1	0	–	–	5	0
Bangkok United	2018	Thai League 1	6	1	1	0	–	–	7	1
Bangkok United	Total		10	1	2	0	0	0	12	1
Career total			222	17	15	1	7	1	244	19

== Honours ==
Esteghlal

- Iran Pro League: 2008–09
- Hazfi Cup: 2007–08

Persepolis

- Iran Pro League: Runner-up 2013–14
