= Hadi Shakouri =

Iranian footballer

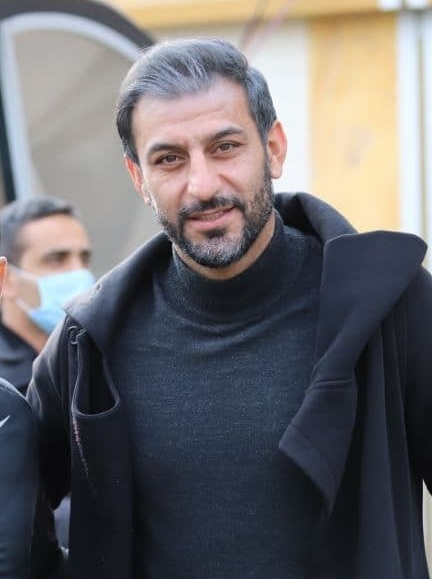
- Shakouri in 2020

Personal information
- Date of birth: 2 May 1982 (age 44)
- Place of birth: Tehran, Iran
- Height: 1.87 m (6 ft 2 in)
- Position: Defender

Team information
- Current team: Esteghlal (assistant coach)

Youth career
- 2000–2003: Saipa
- 2003–2004: Pas

Senior career*
Years	Team	Apps	(Gls)
2004–2007	Pas	64	(6)
2007	Al-Arabi	15	(0)
2008	Zob Ahan	9	(0)
2008–2011	Esteghlal	60	(3)
2011–2012	Shahin Bushehr	28	(1)
2012–2013	Naft Tehran	16	(2)
2013–2014	Padideh	7	(0)
2014–2015	Saba Qom	37	(3)
2015–2016	Khoneh Be Khoneh	29	(3)
2016	Rah Ahan	17	(3)
2017	Aluminium Arak	11	(0)
2017–2018	Gol Reyhan Alborz	22	(2)
2018–2019	Sorkhpooshan Pakdasht	10	(4)

International career
2005–2008	Iran	11	(0)

Managerial career
- 2019: Rayka Babol
- 2020: Chooka Talesh
- 2021: Shahrvand Noor
- 2022: Khooshe Talaee (assistant)
- 2023: Nassaji (assistant)
- 2023–2024: Petro Palayesh
- 2025–: Esteghlal (assistant)
- * Club domestic league appearances and goals

Hadi Shakouri (Persian: هادی شكوری; born 2 May 1982) is an Iranian football coach and a former defender. He is an assistant manager with Esteghlal.

== Club career ==
Shakouri, a product of the Pas Tehran youth academy played for the PAS Tehran first team since 2004. He won the Iran's Premier Football League With PAS Tehran F.C. in the season 2003/04 and played for PAS in AFC Champions League. On April 22, 2007, Shakouri signed for Qatari club Al-Arabi in a one-year deal.

Shakouri became a free agent after terminating his contract with Al-Arabi due to his child's illness and he was linked with a move to Persepolis. But on February 20, 2008, signed a contract until the end of the 2007–08 season with Zob Ahan Despite having offer from Persepolis again He joined Esteghlal for 2008–09 season. He was one of the regular players of Esteghlal where they won the league. He left Esteghlal in June 2011 and joined Shahin Bushehr.

== International career ==
He made his debut for Iran in August 2005 in a match against Libya. He was used as Hossein Kaebi substitute for several times. He was selected among Iran's reserve men for the 2006 FIFA World Cup.

Hadi Shakouri had two more caps for the national team in August 2006, and in October 2006 he was called up again to join Team Melli in an LG cup tournament held in Jordan.

== Career statistics ==
As of 22 May 2019

Club performance			League		Cup		Continental		Total	
Season	Club	League	Apps	Goals	Apps	Goals	Apps	Goals	Apps	Goals
Iran			League		Hazfi Cup		Asia		Total	
2004–05	Pas	Persian Gulf Pro League	24	4				0		
2005–06	Pas	Persian Gulf Pro League	25	1			-	-		
2006–07	Pas	Persian Gulf Pro League	15	1			-	-		
Qatar			League		Emir of Qatar Cup		Asia		Total	
2007–08	Al Arabi	Qatar Stars League	15	0			-	-		
Iran			League		Hazfi Cup		Asia		Total	
2007–08	Zob Ahan	Persian Gulf Pro League	9	0	0	0	-	-	9	0
2008–09	Esteghlal	Persian Gulf Pro League	20	0	1	0	5	1	26	1
2009–10	Esteghlal	Persian Gulf Pro League	25	2	2	1	1	0	28	3
2010–11	Esteghlal	Persian Gulf Pro League	15	1	1	0	4	0	20	1
2011–12	Shahin	Persian Gulf Pro League	28	1	5	0	-	-	33	1
2012–13	Naft Tehran	Persian Gulf Pro League	16	2	0	0	-	-	16	2
Total	Iran		177	10				1		
Total	Qatar		15	0			0	0		
Career total			192	12				1		

== Honours ==
- Iran's Premier Football League
  - Winner: 2
    - 2003–04 with Pas Tehran
    - 2008–09 with Esteghlal
  - Runner up: 2
    - 2005–06 with Pas Tehran
    - 2010–11 with Esteghlal
- Hazfi Cup
  - Runner up:1
    - 2011–12 with Shahin Bushehr
