= Mehdi Amirabadi =

Iranian footballer

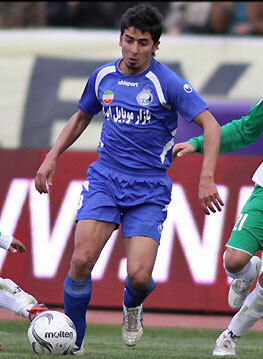

Personal information
- Full name: Mehdi Amirabadi
- Date of birth: 22 February 1979 (age 47)
- Place of birth: Tehran, Iran
- Height: 1.78 m (5 ft 10 in)
- Position: Full back

Youth career
- 1993–1994: Vahdat
- 1994–1995: Bahman
- 1995–1996: Keshavarz
- 1996–1999: Saipa

Senior career*
| Years | Team | Apps | (Gls) |
| 1998–2004 | Saipa | | |
| 2004–2012 | Esteghlal | 165 | (4) |
| 2012–2013 | Foolad | 22 | (0) |
| 2013–2014 | Paykan | 15 | (2) |

International career^{‡}
| 1998–2003 | Iran U-23 | | |
| 2000–2004 | Iran | 20 | (0) |
Medal record
Representing Iran
Asian Games
| Gold medal – first place | 2002 Busan | Team competition |
- * Club domestic league appearances and goals as of 10 May 2013 ‡ National team caps and goals as of 15 November 2006

Mehdi Amirabadi (Persian: مهدی امیرآبادی, born 22 February 1979) is a retired Iranian footballer who usually played as a full back.

== Early years ==
Amirabadi was born in Tehranpars, Tehran, Iran.

== Club career ==
He joined Saipa in 1998. He joined Esteghlal F.C. in 2004. Since joining the club, he has again and again proven himself at the club scoring many vital goals as well as saving many. He has been the regular player since he joined Esteghlal on the right side for the team. In 2012, he was chosen as the club's captain after Farhad Majidi left the club on loan to Al-Gharafa. After spending 8 seasons at Esteghlal, by end of 2011–12 season he moved to Foolad along with Esmaeil Sharifat. He left Foolad in summer 2013 and joined Azadegan League side Paykan. He helped the club to promoted back to the Iran Pro League for the 2014–15 season.

=== Club career statistics ===
Last Update 10 May 2014

| Club performance | | | League | | Cup | | Continental | | Total | |
| Season | Club | League | Apps | Goals | Apps | Goals | Apps | Goals | Apps | Goals |
| Iran | | | League | | Hazfi Cup | | Asia | | Total | |
|---|---|---|---|---|---|---|---|---|---|---|
| 2001–02 | Saipa | Pro League | | 5 | | | – | – | | |
| 2002–03 | Saipa | Pro League | | 1 | | | – | – | | |
| 2003–04 | Saipa | Pro League | | 3 | | | – | – | | |
| 2004–05 | Esteghlal | Pro League | 19 | 0 | 0 | 0 | – | – | 19 | 0 |
| 2005–06 | Esteghlal | Pro League | 21 | 0 | 0 | 0 | – | – | 21 | 0 |
| 2006–07 | Esteghlal | Pro League | 21 | 0 | | | – | – | | |
| 2007–08 | Esteghlal | Pro League | 28 | 2 | | | – | – | | 3 |
| 2008–09 | Esteghlal | Pro League | 25 | 2 | 2 | 1 | 3 | 0 | 30 | 3 |
| 2009–10 | Esteghlal | Pro League | 12 | 0 | 2 | 0 | 3 | 0 | 17 | 0 |
| 2010–11 | Esteghlal | Pro League | 25 | 0 | 3 | 0 | 4 | 0 | 32 | 0 |
| 2011–12 | Esteghlal | Pro League | 14 | 0 | 2 | 0 | 4 | 0 | 20 | 0 |
| 2012–13 | Foolad | Pro League | 22 | 0 | 1 | 0 | – | – | 23 | 0 |
| 2013–14 | Paykan | Division 1 | 15 | 2 | 0 | 0 | – | – | 15 | 2 |
| Career total | | | | 15 | | | 14 | 0 | | |

- Assist Goals

| Season | Team | Assists |
|---|---|---|
| 2005–06 | Esteghlal | 1 |
| 2008–09 | Esteghlal | 1 |
| 2010–11 | Esteghlal | 2 |
| 2011–12 | Esteghlal | 3 |

== International career ==
He was part of the 2004 Asian Cup but did not play any match and never got a regular place for Team Melli.

== Honours ==
=== Club ===
Esteghlal

- Iran Pro League (2): 2005–06, 2008–09
  - Runner up (1): 2010–11
- Hazfi Cup (2): 2007–08, 2011–12
