= Hossein Ghanbari =

Iranian footballer (born 1988)

Personal information
- Full name: Hossein Ghanbari
- Date of birth: February 20, 1988 (age 38)
- Place of birth: Tehran, Iran
- Position: Midfielder

Team information
- Current team: Iranjavan F.C.
- Number: 7

Youth career
- 2002-2006: Esteghlal

Senior career*
Years	Team	Apps	(Gls)
2006–2008	Esteghlal	5	(0)
2008–2009	malavan	17	(2)
2009-2010	Esteghlal	8	(0)
2011–2012	Mes Sarcheshmeh	20	(2)
2013–2014	Paykan	18	(3)
2014-2018	malavan	45	(7)
2018-2019	F.C. Rayka Babol	26	(0)
2019-2020	Iranjavan F.C.	25	(2)

International career
2002-2003	Iran U15	5	(0)
2005-2006	Iran 18	7	(1)
- * Club domestic league appearances and goals

Hossein Ghanbari (Persian: حسين قنبری, born February 20, 1988) is an Iranian football player. He currently plays for the IPL club Iranjavan bushehr as a midfielder.

At the beginning of his adolescence, he went to the youth team of Tehran Municipality, District 17, from the league game, and for playing, he turned his eyes to the Esteghlal Tehran base team. He is also proud to wear the national team jersey of the Islamic Republic of Iran در. Under the coaching of Amir Ghaleh Noei, he joined the Esteghlal senior team and played in several games in the Premier League and the elimination league. During the coaching of Nasser Hejazi and Firooz Karimi, he also played for Esteghlal Tehran in a few games. From the club where he played, to Bandar Anzali Sailors Football Club, Babol House-to-House Football Club, Esteghlal Tehran Football Club, Mentioned Sarcheshmeh Copper Football Club of Kerman and Peykan Football Club of Tehran. He is currently playing in Bushehr Young Iran Football Club ...

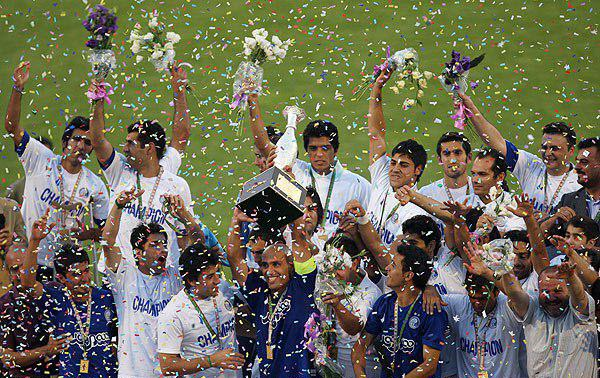

== Honours ==
Esteghlal

- Hazfi Cup: 2007–08
