= Omid Ravankhah =

Iranian football coach (born 1987)

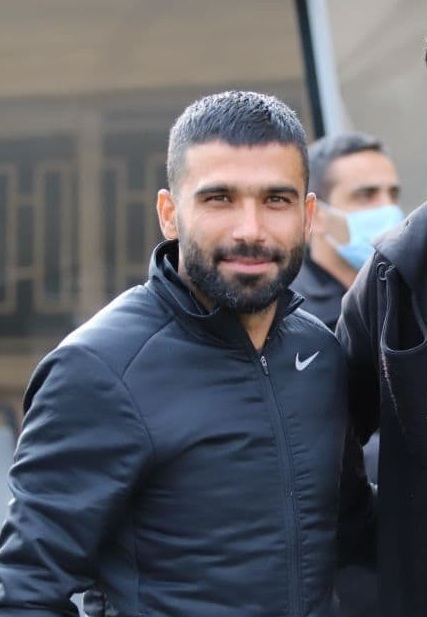

Personal information
- Full name: Omidreza Ravankhah
- Date of birth: 13 April 1987 (age 39)
- Place of birth: Firoozabad, Iran
- Height: 1.70 m (5 ft 7 in)
- Position: Midfielder

Youth career
- 2003–2004: Fajr Sepasi

Senior career*
Years	Team	Apps	(Gls)
2004–2007	Fajr Sepasi	58	(2)
2007–2011	Esteghlal	51	(7)
2011–2013	Saipa	2	(0)
Total		111	(9)

International career
2007	Iran U23	5	(0)

Managerial career
- 2017: Sepidrood (assistant)
- 2017: Sepidrood
- 2017–2018: Gilanmehr Fouman
- 2018–2020: Niroye Zamini
- 2020: Kheybar
- 2021: Baadraan
- 2021–2022: Saipa
- 2022–2024: Pars Jonoubi
- 2024–2025: Paykan
- 2025: Havadar
- 2025–2026: Iran U23
- * Club domestic league appearances and goals

Omid Ravankhah (Persian: امید روانخواه, born April 13, 1987) is a retired Iranian football player and now coach. He played as a midfielder when he was a football player.

== Career ==
Ravankhah joined Esteghlal in 2007. He has scored several key goals for Esteghlal, including two goals against classical rivals Persepolis F.C. so he got named as "امید رفت و برگشت" which translates to 'home and away Omid.' In the first game of the 2008/2009 season he received a serious injury putting him out for several months. Ravankhah played for Esteghlal in the AFC Champions League group stage, appearing against Al-Ittihad on 11 March 2009. He officially announced his retirement on 12 May 2013 at the age of 25, because of his serious old injury.

== Personal life ==
On 11 January 2026, Ravankhah publicly supported the 2025–2026 Iranian protests, stating: "It is my social duty to be with my people in these circumstances, and no matter how much it may cost me, I hope their voices are heard." On 16 January, it is alleged that Ravankhah made a forced confession to the regime-aligned Mehr News Agency claiming his words were exploited by the "enemies of Iran". On 19 January, he was detained and interrogated for an hour at Imam Khomeini International Airport upon returning to Iran from Dubai and had his passport confiscated, after which, he was allowed to leave the airport; he was asked to report to a security agency the next day. Ravankhah was fired as head coach of the national under-23 football team for supporting the protests on 16 February.

== Career statistics ==
As of 31 January 2011

Club performance			League		Cup		Continental		Total	
Season	Club	League	Apps	Goals	Apps	Goals	Apps	Goals	Apps	Goals
Iran			League		Hazfi Cup		Asia		Total	
2004–05	Fajr	Pro League	13	0			-	-		
2005–06	Fajr	Pro League	25	1			-	-		
2006–07	Fajr	Pro League	20	1			-	-		
2007–08	Esteghlal	Pro League	31	6			-	-		
2008–09	Esteghlal	Pro League	5	0		0	5	0		0
2009–10	Esteghlal	Pro League	8	1	0	0	0	0	8	1
2010–11	Esteghlal	Pro League	7	0	2	0	0	0	9	0
2011–12	Saipa	Pro League	2	0	0	0	-	-	2	0
Career total			111	9			5	0		

- Assist Goals

Season	Team	Assists
05–06	Fajr	1
06–07	Fajr	1
07–08	Esteghlal	1
10–11	Esteghlal	0
11–12	Saipa	0

== Honours ==
- Iran's Premier Football League
  - Winner: 1
    - 2008–09 with Esteghlal
  - Runner up: 1
    - 2010–11 with Esteghlal
- Hazfi Cup
  - Winner:1
    - 2007–08 with Esteghlal
