= Meysam Maniei =

Iranian football player and coach (born 1982)

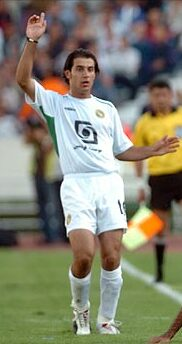
- 2005 Image of Maniei

Personal information
- Full name: Meysam Maniei
- Date of birth: July 24, 1982 (age 44)
- Place of birth: Tehran, Iran
- Height: 1.80 m (5 ft 11 in)
- Position: Midfielder

Team information
- Current team: Gol Reyhan Alborz (manager)

Youth career
- Pas

Senior career*
Years	Team	Apps	(Gls)
2002–07	Pas		
2007–09	Esteghlal	49	(5)
2009–10	Mes Kerman	5	(0)
2010–11	Tractor Sazi	0	(0)
2011–12	Shahin Bushehr	7	(1)

International career^{‡}
2005–06	Iran	3	(0)

Managerial career
- 2015–: Shohadaye Jooybar
- * Club domestic league appearances and goals as of 24 December 2011 ‡ National team caps and goals as of 24 June 2007

Meysam Maniei (Persian: میثم منیعی, born July 24, 1982, in Tehran) is an Iranian football player and coach, who last played for Iran's Premier Football League' s club Shahin Bushehr. Now, He is the sport deputy of the Gol Reyhan Alborz F.C. club.

== Club career ==
=== Club career statistics ===
As of 24 August 2011

Club performance			League		Cup		Continental		Total	
Season	Club	League	Apps	Goals	Apps	Goals	Apps	Goals	Apps	Goals
Iran			League		Hazfi Cup		Asia		Total	
2004–05	Pas	Pro League	18	2			-	-		
2005–06	Pas	Pro League	28	6				0		
2006–07	Pas	Pro League	23	2			-	-		
2007–08	Esteghlal	Pro League	30	4			-	-		
2008–09	Esteghlal	Pro League	19	1	2	0	3	0	24	1
2009–10	Mes	Pro League	5	0			0	0		
2010–11	Tractor Sazi	Pro League	0	0	0	0	-	-	0	0
2011–12	Shahin	Pro League	3	1	0	0	-	-	3	1
Career total			108	14				0		

- Assist Goals

Season	Team	Assists
05–06	Pas	10
06–07	Pas	4
07–08	Esteghlal	3
08–09	Esteghlal	4
10–11	Tractor Sazi	0
11-12	Shahin Bushehr	0

== International career ==
He debuted for Team Melli in August 2006 in a friendly match against the UAE team. he performed very well in this match but ultimately the UAE team defeated them 2-0 but he did very well

== Honours ==
- Iran's Premier Football League
  - Winner: 1
    - 2008/09 with Esteghlal
