= Ali Alizadeh =

Iranian football player

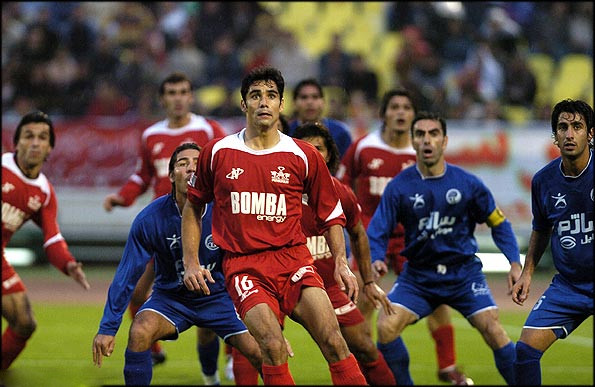

Personal information
- Full name: Ali Alizadeh
- Date of birth: May 3, 1981 (age 45)
- Place of birth: Kerman Province, Iran
- Height: 1.87 m (6 ft 1 1/2 in)
- Position: Forward

Senior career*
Years	Team	Apps	(Gls)
1998–2001	Mes Rafsanajan	9	(6)
2001–2002	Mes Kerman	19	
2002–2005	Fajr Sepasi	71	(8)
2005–2006	Persepolis	26	(5)
2006–2009	Esteghlal	71	(6)
2009–2010	Bargh Shiraz	22	(9)
2010–2012	Tractor	40	(9)

International career
2003–2004	Iran U-23		
- * Club domestic league appearances and goals as of 30 September 2011

Ali Alizadeh (Persian: علی علیزاده, born May 3, 1981) is an Iranian former football player. He was born in Rafsenjan, Kerman. His playing position was forward. He has played for Mess Rafsenjan, Mess. Kerman, Fajr Sepasi Shiraz and Perspolis Tehran, before joining Esteghlal Tehran. He has also played for Bargh Shiraz and Tractor. He then decided to play for Mess Kerman as his last football club and then he retired when he was 36.

== Club career ==
=== Club career statistics ===
Last Update 30 September 2011

Club performance			League		Cup		Continental		Total	
Season	Club	League	Apps	Goals	Apps	Goals	Apps	Goals	Apps	Goals
Iran			League		Hazfi Cup		Asia		Total	
2002–03	Fajr	Pro League		9			-	-		
2003–04	Fajr	Pro League		4			-	-		
2004–05	Fajr	Pro League	17	2			-	-		
2005–06	Persepolis	Pro League	26	6			-	-		
2006–07	Esteghlal	Pro League	28	3			-	-		
2007–08	Esteghlal	Pro League	24	2			-	-		
2008–09	Esteghlal	Pro League	19	1	1	1	4	2	24	4
2009–10	Bargh	Division 1	12	5			-	-		
2010–11	Tractor	Pro League	33	8	1	1	-	-	34	9
2011–12	Tractor	Pro League	7	1	0	0	-	-	7	1
Total	Iran			44			4	2		
Career total				44			4	2		

- Assist Goals

Season	Team	Assists
05–06	Persepolis	3
06–07	Esteghlal	4
07–08	Esteghlal	4
08–09	Esteghlal	4
10–11	Tractor	0

== Honours ==
- Iran's Premier Football League
  - Winner: 1
    - 2008/09 with Esteghlal
- Hazfi Cup
  - Winner: 1
    - 2008 with Esteghlal
  - Runner up: 1
    - 2003 with Fajr Sepasi
