= Asghar Nadali =

Iranian footballer

Personal information
- Full name: Asghar Nadali
- Date of birth: 19 September 1985 (age 41)
- Place of birth: Iran
- Position: Forward

Team information
- Current team: Oxin Alborz
- Number: 3

Senior career*
Years	Team	Apps	(Gls)
2006–2007	Nassaji		(7)
2007–2008	Esteghlal	8	(0)
2009–2010	Nassaji		(2)
2010	Gostaresh Foolad	7	(0)
2010–2011	Esteghlal Ahvaz	8	(0)
2011–	Sanat Sari	3	(0)
- * Club domestic league appearances and goals as of 2 September 2010 (UTC) ‡ National team caps and goals as of 17 May 2010

Asghar Nadali (born September 19, 1985) is an Iranian footballer who currently plays for Sanat Sari in the Azadegan League.

== Club career ==
Nadali joined Esteghlal in 2007 after spending the previous season at Nassaji and re-joined Nassaji following that campaign. nadali then joined Gostaresh Foolad, followed by Esteghlal Ahvaz with Sanat Sari being the side where he currently plays.

=== Club career statistics ===
As of 13 December 2011

Club performance			League		Cup		Continental		Total	
Season	Club	League	Apps	Goals	Apps	Goals	Apps	Goals	Apps	Goals
Iran			League		Hazfi Cup		Asia		Total	
2006–07	Nassaji	Azadegan League		7			-	-		
2007–08	Esteghlal	Iran Pro League	8	0	0	0	-	-	8	0
2009–10	Nassaji	Azadegan League		2			-	-		
2010–11	Gostaresh Foolad	Azadegan League	7	0			-	-		
2010–11	Esteghlal Ahvaz	Azadegan League	8	0			-	-		
2011–12	Sanat Sari	Azadegan League	3	0	0	0	-	-	3	0
Total	Iran			9			0	0		
Career total				9			0	0		

- Assist Goals

Season	Team	Assists
2007–08	Esteghlal	0
