= Ashkan Namdari =

Iranian footballer (born 1977)

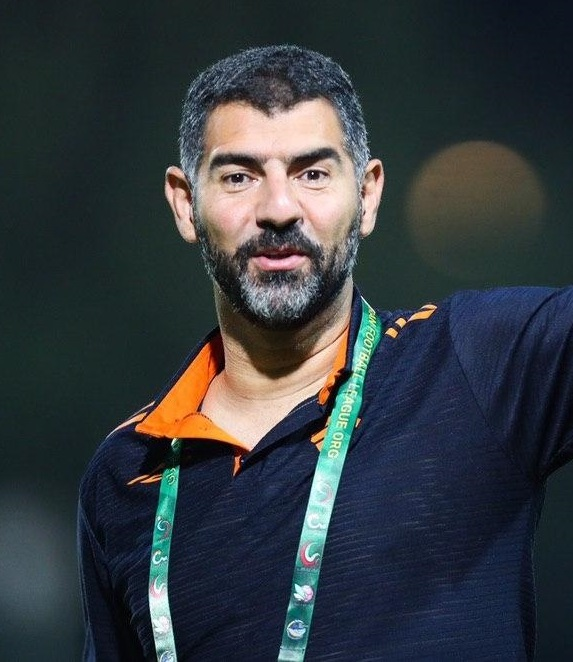

Personal information
- Full name: Ashkan Namdari
- Date of birth: February 1, 1977 (age 49)
- Place of birth: Iran
- Height: 1.89 m (6 ft 2 in)
- Position: Goalkeeper

Team information
- Current team: Nassaji (goalkeeping coach)

Senior career*
Years	Team	Apps	(Gls)
2000-2004	Sanaye Arak F.C.	66	(0)
2004–2006	Bargh Shiraz F.C.	24	(0)
2006–2007	Sanaye Arak F.C.	13 caps4 = 11	(0)
2007–2009	Esteghlal		(0)
2009–2010	Aboomoslem	7	(0)
2010–2011	Esteghlal Ahvaz	6	(0)

Managerial career
- 2017–2019: Esteghlal (goalkeeping coach)
- 2019–2020: Saipa (goalkeeping coach)
- 2020–2021: Shahr Khodro (goalkeeping coach)
- 2022–2023: Aluminium Arak (goalkeeping coach)
- 2023–: Nassaji (goalkeeping coach)
- * Club domestic league appearances and goals

Ashkan Namdari is an Iranian retired football player and current coach. He played for Esteghlal and Aboomoslem in IPL as a goalkeeper. He has been coach of Nassaji since 2023.

== Club career ==
=== Club career statistics ===
Last update 12 May 2010

Club performance			League		Cup		Continental		Total	
Season	Club	League	Apps	Goals	Apps	Goals	Apps	Goals	Apps	Goals
Iran			League		Hazfi Cup		Asia		Total	
2004–05	Bargh	Persian Gulf Cup	12	0		0	-	-		0
2005–06	Bargh	Persian Gulf Cup	12	0		0	-	-		0
2006–07	Sanaye Arak	Azadegan League		0		0	-	-		0
2007–08	Esteghlal	Persian Gulf Cup	5	0	0	0	-	-	5	0
2008–09	Esteghlal	Persian Gulf Cup	6	0	1	0	1	0	8	0
2009–10	Aboomoslem	Persian Gulf Cup	7	0		0	-	-		0
Total	Iran		42	0		0	1	0		0
Career total			42	0		0	1	0		0

== Honours ==
Esteghlal

- Persian Gulf Pro League: 2008–09
