= Ahmad Khaziravi =

Iranian footballer

Personal information
- Full name: Ahmad Khaziravi
- Date of birth: July 23, 1989 (age 37)
- Place of birth: Abadan, Iran
- Height: 1.92 m (6 ft 4 in)
- Position: Striker

Senior career*
Years	Team	Apps	(Gls)
2005–2007	Pas	14	(3)
2007–2009	Esteghlal	2	(0)
2009–2010	Bargh	28	(10)
2010–	Iranjavan	43	(19)
- * Club domestic league appearances and goals

Ahmad Khaziravi (Persian: احمد خذیراوی, July 23, 1989 in Abadan, Iran) is an Iranian football player currently playing for Bargh Shiraz F.C. in Azadegan League.

== Club career ==
=== Club career statistics ===
As of 18 May 2010

Club performance			League		Cup		Continental		Total	
Season	Club	League	Apps	Goals	Apps	Goals	Apps	Goals	Apps	Goals
Iran			League		Hazfi Cup		Asia		Total	
2005–06	Pas	Persian Gulf Cup	2	0				0		
2006–07	Pas	Persian Gulf Cup	0	0			-	-		
2007–08	Esteghlal	Persian Gulf Cup	2	0			-	-		
2008–09	Esteghlal	Persian Gulf Cup	3	0	1	1	1	0	5	1
2009–10	Bargh	Azadegan League	8	1			-	-		
2010–11	Iranjavan	Azadegan League					-	-		
Total	Iran		16	2				0		
Career total			16	2				0		

== Club career ==
Khaziravi made his first senior team appearance for Esteghlal F.C. on August 5, 2008, against F.C. Aboumoslem

- Iran's Premier Football League
  - Winner: 1
    - 2008–09 with Esteghlal
