= Bijan Koushki =

Iranian football player (born 1979)

Personal information
- Full name: Bijan Koushki
- Date of birth: 24 June 1979 (age 47)
- Place of birth: Khorramabad, Iran
- Height: 1.79 m (5 ft 10 in)
- Position: Defender

Senior career*
Years	Team	Apps	(Gls)
2002–2005	Aboumoslem		
2005–2007	Pas	33	(0)
2007–2011	Esteghlal	58	(0)
2011–2012	Mes Kerman	4	(0)
- * Club domestic league appearances and goals

Bijan Koushki (Persian: بیژن کوشکی; born 24 June 1979, in Khorramabad) is a former Iranian football player, who last played for Mes Kerman in the IPL. He usually played as a defender.

== Club career ==
He started to impress in Pas and moved to Esteghlal in 2007.

=== Club career statistics ===
As of 22 December 2011

Club performance			League		Cup		Continental		Total	
Season	Club	League	Apps	Goals	Apps	Goals	Apps	Goals	Apps	Goals
Iran			League		Hazfi Cup		Asia		Total	
2004–05	Aboumoslem	Pro League	16	0			-	-		
2005–06	Pas	Pro League	17	0			-	-		
2006–07	Pas	Pro League	16	0			-	-		
2007–08	Esteghlal	Pro League	19	0			-	-		
2008–09	Esteghlal	Pro League	26	0	1	0	4	0	31	0
2009–10	Esteghlal	Pro League	5	0	0	0	0	0	5	0
2010–11	Esteghlal	Pro League	8	0	0	0	0	0	8	0
2011–12	Mes Kerman	Pro League	4	0	2	0	-	-	6	0
Career total			111	0			4	0		

- Assist Goals

Season	Team	Assists
05–06	Pas	1
10–11	Esteghlal	0
11-12	Mes Kerman	0

== Honours ==
=== Club ===
- Iran's Premier Football League
  - Winner: 1
    - 2008–09 with Esteghlal
  - Runner up: 2
    - 2005–06 with Pas Tehran
    - 2010–11 with Esteghlal
  - Third Place: 1
    - 2009–10 With Esteghlal
- Hazfi Cup
  - Winner: 1
    - 2007–08 with Esteghlal
