= Arash Borhani =

Iranian footballer and coach

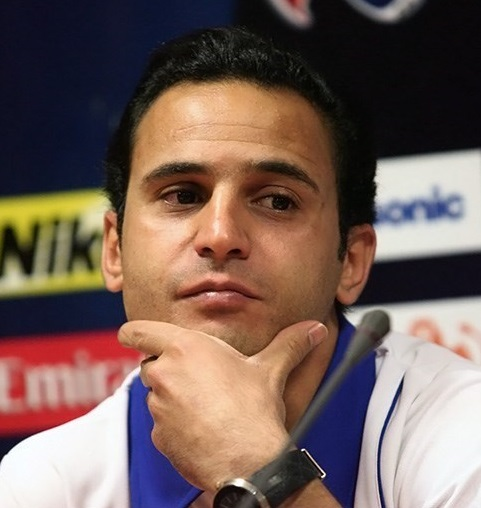
- Borhani in 2014 at 2014 FIFA World Cup press conference

Personal information
- Full name: Arash Borhani
- Date of birth: 14 September 1983 (age 43)
- Place of birth: Kerman, Iran
- Height: 1.78 m (5 ft 10 in)
- Position: Striker

Youth career
- 1997–2001: Kerman FC
- 2001–2002: PAS Tehran

Senior career*
Years	Team	Apps	(Gls)
2002–2006	PAS Tehran	94	(33)
2006–2007	Al Nasr	7	(1)
2007	→ PAS Tehran (loan)	11	(2)
2007–2016	Esteghlal	229	(80)
2016–2017	Paykan	5	(0)
Total		346	(116)

International career^{‡}
2003–2006	Iran U23	16	(12)
2003–2010	Iran	37	(10)

Managerial career
- 2018–2020: Esteghlal (youth)
- 2020–: Esteghlal (assistant)
- 2020–: Esteghlal Youth
- 2023: Shahrdari Astara F.C.
Medal record
Representing Iran
Men's Football
West Asian Games
Bronze medal – third place	2006 Qatar	Team competition
- * Club domestic league appearances and goals as of 25 September 2020 ‡ National team caps and goals as of 25 September 2020

Arash Borhani (Persian: آرش برهانی; born 14 September 1983 in Kerman, Iran) is a retired Iranian football player and coach. He is the all-time top goal scorer of Esteghlal and also the second all-time top goal scorer in Iran's Persian Gulf Pro League. He was the top goal scorer of 2008–09 Iran's Premier Football League. He was also a member of the Iran national football team. Borhani won a bronze medal in 2006 Asian Games with Iran national under-23 football team.

Arash Borhani is a former Iranian footballer who has played for several clubs throughout his career, including PAS Tehran, Al-Nasr (UAE), Esteghlal, and Paykan. He also made 37 appearances for the Iranian national team, scoring 10 goals. Additionally, Borhani was a key player for the Iran U-23 national team, contributing to their success in winning the bronze medal at the 2006 Asian Games.

== Club career ==
=== Pas ===
Having just moved to Pas in Iran's Premier Football league, he helped the club to finish second in the 2002–03 season. He scored four goals in the season, which three of them was on a hat-trick in the last match of the season. He continued with Pas for the next seasons and became a fixed starter. He was one of club's main players in 2005 AFC Champions League season.

=== Al-Nasr ===
Shortly before the 2006 FIFA World Cup, Borhani signed for the UAE Pro League, Al Nasr. On 21 January 2007 Borhani signed back with his former team Pas after being released by Al Nasr due to unforeseen circumstances. Since signing back with Pas, within a period of five months, he has scored only twice, which has put him through the most difficult time in his career.

=== Esteghlal ===
Borhani had offers from Al-Ain of the UAE, Mouscron of the Belgian League, Vitória Setúbal of the Portuguese Liga, Denizlispor of the Süper Lig and Mes Kerman and Esteghlal of Iran's Premier Football League, though it was not known which offer Borhani was likely to accept. However, on 17 July 2007 Borhani signed a contract with the IPL giants Esteghlal. On 27 October Borhani scored his first hat-trick for Esteghlal in a 3–2 win over Paykan. Borhani again scored a hat-trick plus two against Pegah Gilan in the Hazfi Cup ending up with five goals, the game's final score being 8–1 in favor of Esteghlal. He became the top scorer in 2008–09 season with 21 goals. The next season, he scored 11 goals but missed so many chances during the final matches of the season. On 14 January 2013, he became Esteghlal's all-time top goal scorers after scoring against Mes Kerman, surprising Ali Jabbari. He was his team's top scorer at the 2012–13 season, which they won the Iran Pro League title. He extended his contract with the club for next two seasons on 1 July 2013. On 9 February 2014, Borhani scored his 100th goal for Esteghlal in a 2–0 win over Saipa. On 14 June 2014, Borhani signed a new contract with Esteghlal, keeping him until 2016.

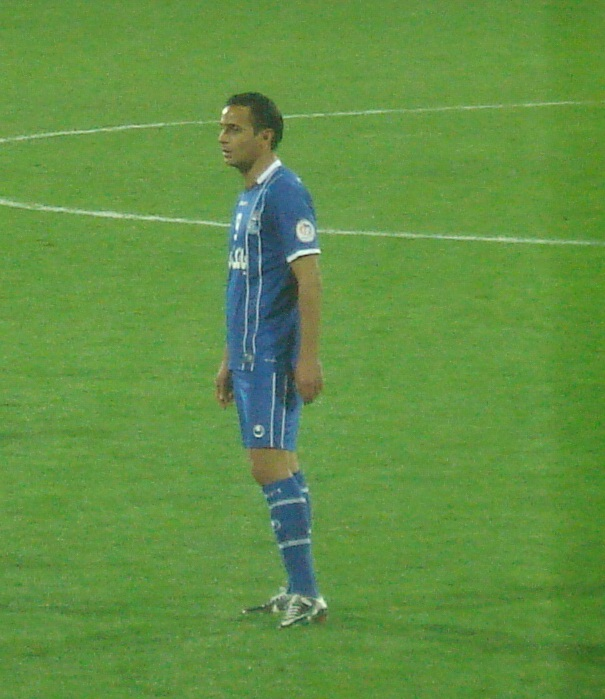
Borhani playing for Esteghlal in 2013

=== Club career statistics ===
- Last update: 17 July 2018

Club performance			League		Cup		Continental		Total	
Season	Club	League	Apps	Goals	Apps	Goals	Apps	Goals	Apps	Goals
Iran			League		Hazfi Cup		Asia		Total	
2002–03	Pas	Pro League	18	4	2	0	—		20	4
2003–04	Pas	Pro League	24	12	0	0	—		24	12
2004–05	Pas	Pro League	25	9	0	0	—		25	9
2005–06	Pas	Pro League	27	8	0	0	7	4	34	12
United Arab Emirates			League		President's Cup		Asia		Total	
2006–07	Al-Nasr	UAE League	7	1	2	2	—		9	3
Iran			League		Hazfi Cup		Asia		Total	
2006–07	Pas	Pro League	11	2	0	0	—		11	2
2007–08	Esteghlal	Pro League	31	8	6	4	—		37	12
2008–09	Esteghlal	Pro League	30	20	1	5	6	2	37	27
2009–10	Esteghlal	Pro League	29	11	1	3	6	0	36	14
2010–11	Esteghlal	Pro League	23	14	3	0	5	2	31	16
2011–12	Esteghlal	Pro League	30	8	4	0	8	5	42	13
2012–13	Esteghlal	Pro League	27	10	4	2	9	3	40	15
2013–14	Esteghlal	Pro League	21	5	3	0	5	1	29	6
2014–15	Esteghlal	Pro League	24	2	1	1	—		25	3
2015–16	Esteghlal	Pro League	14	2	2	0	—		16	2
2016–17	Paykan	Pro League	5	0	0	0	—		5	0
Total	Iran		339	115	27	15	46	17	410^{1}	147^{1}
Total	United Arab Emirates		7	1	2	2	0	0	9	3
Career total			346	116	29	17	46^{1}	17	419^{1}	150^{1}

^{1} Statistics Incomplete.

=== Assist Goals ===
Season	Team	Assists
05–06	Pas	4
06–07	Pas	1
07–08	Esteghlal	2
08–09	Esteghlal	2
09–10	Esteghlal	1
10–11	Esteghlal	3
11–12	Esteghlal	1
12–13	Esteghlal	2
13–14	Esteghlal	2
14–15	Esteghlal	3

== International career ==
While playing for Pas Tehran, he was called to the Iran U-23 team for the 2004 Athens Olympics qualifications, where he had some good performances, including scoring four goals in two games versus Uzbekistan. Despite the talent on the team, the Iran U-23 team did not qualify for the 2004 Summer Olympics.

Around the same time he was called up to the Team Melli, where he scored some crucial goals, such as the tying goal versus Qatar in a 2006 FIFA World Cup qualification match. He was not a regular starter for the team, but he was among Iran's final squad for 2006 FIFA World Cup.

In November 2006, he once again joined Iran U-23 team to participate at the 2006 Asian Games. In the quarter-final match against China, Borhani held the ball short of the goal line and invited his teammates to approach after masterfully dribbling around the Chinese goalkeeper. He held that position for a few seconds before moving the ball over the line and then started running with joy towards the bench and celebrating with others. Later on he apologized for dishonoring the China U-23 team.

He was called up to the national squad by Iranian coach Ali Daei to play in 2010 FIFA World Cup qualification – AFC third round. He also played in 2011 AFC Asian Cup qualification for Team Melli.

=== International goals ===
Scores and results list Iran's goal tally first.

#	Date	Venue	Opponent	Score	Result	Competition
1	21 June 2004	Azadi Stadium, Tehran	Syria	3–0	7–1	2004 WAFF
2	21 June 2004	Azadi Stadium, Tehran	Syria	4–0	7–1	2004 WAFF
3	23 June 2004	Azadi Stadium, Tehran	Iraq	2–1	2–1	2004 WAFF
4	25 June 2004	Azadi Stadium, Tehran	Syria	3–1	4–1	2004 WAFF
5	9 October 2004	Khalifa International Stadium, Doha	Qatar	2–2	3–2	2006 WCQ
6	17 November 2004	Azadi Stadium, Tehran	Laos	6–0	7–0	2006 WCQ
7	2 February 2005	Azadi Stadium, Tehran	Bosnia and Herzegovina	2–1	2–1	Friendly
8	28 May 2006	Gradski Vrt Stadium, Osijek	Croatia	2–1	2–2	Friendly
9	2 January 2009	Azadi Stadium, Tehran	China	1–0	3–1	Friendly
10	12 August 2009	Asim Ferhatović Hase Stadium, Sarajevo	Bosnia and Herzegovina	2–2	3–2	Friendly

== Honours ==
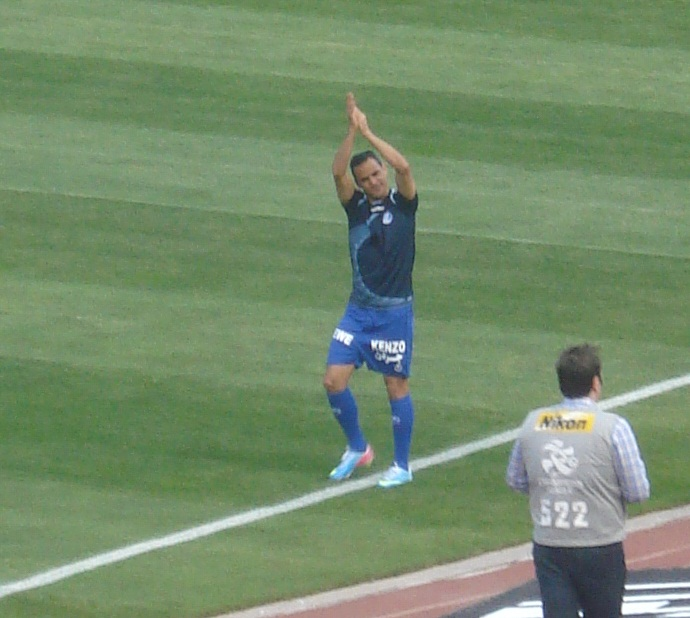
Borhani after winning the 2012–13 season with Esteghlal

=== Club ===
Pas Tehran

- Iran Pro League (1): 2003–04

Esteghlal

- Iran Pro League (2): 2008–09, 2012–13
- Hazfi Cup (2): 2007–08, 2011–12

=== Country ===
- WAFF Championship (1): 2004

=== Individual ===
- Iran Pro League top goalscorer (1): 2008–09
