= Esteghlal F.C.–Sepahan S.C. rivalry =

Football rivalry in Iran

Esteghlal F.C. v Sepahan S.C.
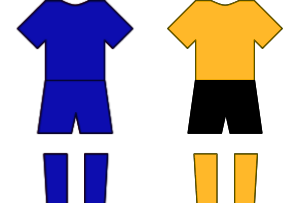
- Location: Tehran; Isfahan, Iran
- Teams: Esteghlal Football Club; Sepahan Sport Club
- First meeting: Sepahan 0–4 Esteghlal (28 January 1972); 1971–72 Local League
- Latest meeting: Esteghlal 2–0 Sepahan (23 August 2026); 2026–27 Persian Gulf Pro League

Statistics
- Total meetings: Official matches: 85; Total matches: 89
- Most wins: Officials: Esteghlal (33); Total: Tie (draw) (33)
- Top scorer: Officials: Levon Stepanyan; Mehdi Seyed-Salehi (6)
- Largest victory: Sepahan 0–4 Esteghlal; 1971–72 Local League (28 January 1972)

The rivalry between Esteghlal and Sepahan is a football rivalry played between Iranian football clubs Esteghlal Tehran and Sepahan Isfahan.

== History ==
Since 1971–72 Iran football season, Esteghlal Tehran and Sepahan Isfahan had several meetings in Iranian League, Hazfi Cup, and friendly matches.

The first was in Local League 1971–72 in Isfahan, that Esteghlal won the match with the result of 4–0. First win for Sepahan was in Takht Jamshid Cup 1974–75 with the result of 1–0.

Before the Iranian Revolution in 1979, two football clubs met 10 times (2 times in Local League and 8 times in Takht Jamshid Cup). From these 10 meetings, each club won four matches and the result of two matches was draw.

From 1991–92 to 2000–01 Iranian Football Seasons, two clubs met 18 times (16 times in Azadegan League, and 2 times in Naghsh-Jahan Tournament in Esfahan). From these 18 meetings, Esteghlal won 8 matches and Sepahan won 5. The result of the other 5 matches was draw.

Since the establishment of Iran Pro League in 2001, two clubs met 30 times (22 times in Iran Pro League, 6 times in Hazfi Cup, once in AFC Champions League, and once in Tehran Etehadiyeh Cup). From these 30 meetings, Esteghlal won 8 matches and Sepahan won 15. The result of the other 7 matches was draw.

The best win for Esteghlal took place in the clubs first meeting in Local League 1971–72 with the score of 4–0. And the best win for Sepahan was in 2002–03 Hazfi Cup with the score of 3–0.

The highest goal-scoring match was in 2010–11 Iran Pro League with the result of 4–3 for Esteghlal.

== Notable matches and seasons ==
=== 2001–02 Hazfi Cup ===
Two football clubs faced each other in Semi-final of 2001–02 Hazfi Cup in a two-leg meeting.

Esteghlal missed the championship of the 2001–02 Iran Pro League on the last day, losing to Persepolis. Winning the Hazfi Cup was important to them. On the other side Sepahan lost both matches in 2001–02 Iran Pro League to Esteghlal. They wanted to compensate for losing the two matches.

The first leg was held in Isfahan, and Sepahan could win the match with the result of 4–2. However, in the second leg in Tehran, it was Esteghlal who would win the match with the result of 3–1, making it 5-5 on aggregate. Esteghlal could advance into the final due to away goals.

In the final, Esteghlal also could beat Fajr Sepasi and became the champion.

=== A dramatic season for Sepahan (5 matches, 5 wins) ===
In 2002–03 Iranian Football Season, two clubs met each other 5 times, and dramatically, Sepahan could won all 5 meetings with coaching of Farhad Kazemi. From these five meetings, 2 of them were in 2002–03 Iran Pro League, 2 of them were in 2002–03 Hazfi Cup, and the last one in a four-team friendly tournament (Etehadiyeh Cup) hosted by Esteghlal.

In 2002–03 Iran Pro League, Sepahan could beat Esteghlal in both league matches in Tehran and Isfahan with the similar result of 3–2.

In the 1/8 final of 2002–03 Hazfi Cup, two clubs again faced each other in a two-leg meeting. The first leg was held in Isfahan, and Sepahan could win the match with the result of 3–0. In the second leg in Tehran, it was again Sepahan who could beat Esteghlal with the result of 1–0.

After the end of 2002–03 Iran's Football Season and before the starting of the new Iranian Football Season, a four-team friendly tournament with the name of Etehadiyeh Cup held in Tehran hosted by Esteghlal. In this tournament Esteghlal as the host, Sepahan and Pas Tehran as the champion and runner-up of 2002–03 Iran Pro League, and Al Wasl from Dubai as the guest team participated. In the Semi-final of the tournament, Seaphan and Esteghlal again faced each other and Sepahan could beat Esteghlal with the result of 3–2 and advanced to the final of the tournament. In the final, Sepahan also could beat Pas Tehran and became the champion.

As a result, Sepahan won all five meetings between the two clubs that season, setting a record of five consecutive victories in this fixture.

=== 2003–04 Hazfi Cup ===
In 2003–04 Iran's Football Season, two football clubs reached the Final of 2003–04 Hazfi Cup.

Esteghlal by coaching of Amir Ghalenoei had a great performance in 2003–04 Iran Pro League and becoming the runner-up. On the other side, Sepahan by coaching of Farhad Kazemi did not have a successful season in 2003–04 Iran Pro League. Therefore, and before the starting of Final, Esteghlal seemed to be the favor for winning the Hazfi Cup title. The first leg was played in Isfahan, where Sepahan defeated Esteghlal 3–2 in a closely contested and exciting match, with Sepahan scoring the winning goal in the 90th minute. With this result, Esteghlal needed only a victory in the second leg by a score of 1–0 or 2–1 to secure the championship.

However, the story of second-leg match was different. In the second leg in Tehran and in front of more than 85000 Esteghlal fans, it was Sepahan could perform really great and won the match with the result of 2–0. It was a really unexpected loss for Esteghlal fans and Amir Ghalenoei, due to their great performance during the league season. On the other side, it was a really dramatic win for Sepahan fans and Frahad Kazemi.

Therefore, after these two dramatic matches, Seaphan could become the champion by the total result of 5–2.

=== 2012 AFC Champions League ===
At the end of 2011–12 Iran's Football Season, two football clubs met each other in the 1/8 Final of 2012 AFC Champions League.

This was the first meeting of two football clubs in an international and continental tournaments.

By winning this match, Esteghlal had the possibility to go for the first time to the Quarter-Finals of AFC Champions League since its establishment in 2002. On the other side, Sepahan's fans expected from their team to win this match and go forward for the first Asian title after three-year-in-a-row Iran's football championships.

On May 22, 2012, the match was held in Isfahan and finally Sepahan could win the match with the result of 2–0. Therefore, Sepahan advanced to Quarter-Finals of AFC Champions League for the third time in the history of the club. The Quarter-Final round will be held in September 2012.

== Iranian League ==
No.	Date	Home team	Score	Away team	Home goal scorers	Away goal scorers	Venue	Competition
1	1972–Jan-28	Sepahan	0–4	Esteghlal	–	Mazloumi (32, 40), Mojdehi (67), Haghverdian (89)	Isfahan	1971–72 Local League
2	1972–Mar-17	Esteghlal	2–0	Sepahan	A. Jabbari (43), Mazloumi (61)	–	Tehran	1971–72 Local League
3	1974–Apr-11	Esteghlal	2–0	Sepahan	Mazloumi (34), A. Jabbari (67)	–	Tehran	1974–75 Takht Jamshid Cup
4	1974–Nov-1	Sepahan	1–0	Esteghlal	Heydari (22)	–	Isfahan	1974–75 Takht Jamshid Cup
5	1975–May-30	Sepahan	1–0	Esteghlal	Nadimian (77)	–	Isfahan	1975–76 Takht Jamshid Cup
6	1975–Nov-14	Esteghlal	0–0	Sepahan	–	–	Tehran	1975–76 Takht Jamshid Cup
7	1976–Jan-9	Esteghlal	1–0	Sepahan	Ebrahimi (39)	–	Tehran	1976–77 Takht Jamshid Cup
8	1976–Jul-2	Sepahan	1–0	Esteghlal	Saffarpour (57)	–	Isfahan	1976–77 Takht Jamshid Cup
9	1977–Jul-10	Esteghlal	3–3	Sepahan	Nazari (17), Naraghi (45), Rowshan (53)	Shah Zeydi (65), Khorvash (83), Rahimi (88)	Tehran	1977–78 Takht Jamshid Cup
10	1978–Jan-13	Sepahan	1–0	Esteghlal	Jahani (35)	–	Isfahan	1977–78 Takht Jamshid Cup
11	1992–Feb-28	Esteghlal	3–1	Sepahan	Bayani (25, 38), Fonounizadeh (34)	Shahmohammadi (65)	Tehran	1991–92 Azadegan League
12	1992–May-22	Sepahan	2–1	Esteghlal	Basirat (53), Ghanbari (87 p.)	Fonounizadeh (70 p.)	Isfahan	1991–92 Azadegan League
14	1994–Jul-28	Esteghlal	3–2	Sepahan	Nadafi (45), Zarincheh (48), Akbarian (63)	Mousavi (29), Ghanbari (52 p.)	Tehran	1994–95 Azadegan League
15	1994–Nov-11	Sepahan	3–1	Esteghlal	Mousavi (41, 59, 90+1)	Taghavi (84)	Isfahan	1994–95 Azadegan League
16	1995–Jun-15	Esteghlal	1–0	Sepahan	Mansourian (79)	–	Tehran	1995–96 Azadegan League
17	1995–Nov-9	Sepahan	2–1	Esteghlal	Loveynian (52), Memarian (82)	Varmazyar (90 p.)	Isfahan	1995–96 Azadegan League
19	1996–Jun-27	Sepahan	0–0	Esteghlal	–	–	Isfahan	1996–97 Azadegan League
20	1996–Dec-19	Esteghlal	1–2	Sepahan	Pashazadeh (45)	Stepanyan (38), Mousavi (85)	Tehran	1996–97 Azadegan League
21	1997–Dec-25	Esteghlal	2–1	Sepahan	Majidi (25), Mansourian (60)	Khademi (52)	Tehran	1997–98 Azadegan League
22	1998–May-8	Sepahan	0–1	Esteghlal	–	Garousi (50)	Isfahan	1997–98 Azadegan League
23	1999–Apr-13	Sepahan	1–1	Esteghlal	Basirat (18 p.)	A. Akbarpour (22)	Isfahan	1998–99 Azadegan League
24	1999–May-24	Esteghlal	1–1	Sepahan	Majidi (35)	Momenzadeh (38)	Tehran	1998–99 Azadegan League
25	1999–Oct-14	Sepahan	1–4	Esteghlal	Veisi (76)	Latifi (30), Dadashzadeh (40), Vahedi Nikbakht (79), Navazi (80 p.)	Isfahan	1999–2000 Azadegan League
26	2000–Jan-30	Esteghlal	2–1	Sepahan	Niksirat (47), A. Akbarpour (75)	Stepanyan (59)	Tehran	1999–2000 Azadegan League
27	2000–Nov-10	Esteghlal	1–1	Sepahan	Hasheminasab (64 p.)	Dehghani (18)	Tehran	2000–01 Azadegan League
28	2001–Feb-4	Sepahan	0–2	Esteghlal	–	Hamedani (29, 41)	Isfahan	2000–01 Azadegan League
29	2002–Jan-27	Sepahan	0–1	Esteghlal	–	Fatemi (34)	Isfahan	2001–02 Iran Pro League
30	2002–May-14	Esteghlal	3–0	Sepahan	Navazi (10 p.), Mohagheghian (46 o.g.), Dinmohammadi (86)	–	Tehran	2001–02 Iran Pro League
33	2002–Nov-3	Esteghlal	2–3	Sepahan	Vahedi Nikbakht (52), Akbari (71)	Hajipour (10, 32), Navidkia (90 p.)	Tehran	2002–03 Iran Pro League
35	2003–Apr-24	Sepahan	3–2	Esteghlal	Navidkia (43 p., 48), Karimi Sibaki (88)	Akbari (75) Hassanzadeh (80 o.g.)	Isfahan	2002–03 Iran Pro League
38	2003–Nov-30	Sepahan	0–0	Esteghlal	–	–	Isfahan	2003–04 Iran Pro League
39	2004–Apr-12	Esteghlal	2–1	Sepahan	Enayati (3), Samereh (82)	Ramezani (2)	Tehran	2003–04 Iran Pro League
42	2004–Dec-31	Sepahan	2–2	Esteghlal	Bezik (67), Khatibi (80)	Samereh (28), Enayati (50)	Isfahan	2004–05 Iran Pro League
43	2005–Jun-20	Esteghlal	2–2	Sepahan	Enayati (13), S. Akbarpour (69)	Khatibi (62, 84)	Tehran	2004–05 Iran Pro League
44	2005–Oct-16	Sepahan	1–0	Esteghlal	Jafarpour (31)	–	Isfahan	2005–06 Iran Pro League
45	2006–Feb-12	Esteghlal	2–1	Sepahan	Sadeghi (55), M. Jabbari (58)	Khatibi (42)	Tehran	2005–06 Iran Pro League
46	2006–Dec-1	Esteghlal	2–1	Sepahan	Baou (39, 90)	Maheri 12'	Tehran	2006–07 Persian Gulf Cup
47	2007–Apr-20	Sepahan	1–0	Esteghlal	Aghili (90 p.)	–	Isfahan	2006–07 Persian Gulf Cup
48	2007–Oct-7	Sepahan	2–1	Esteghlal	Abu Al-Hail (7, 90)	P. Ghorbani (74)	Isfahan	2007–08 Persian Gulf Cup
49	2008–Mar-29	Esteghlal	0–1	Sepahan	–	Hajsafi (65)	Tehran	2007–08 Persian Gulf Cup
50	2008–Aug-17	Esteghlal	1–1	Sepahan	P. Ghorbani (74)	Jafarpour (24)	Tehran	2008–09 Persian Gulf Cup
51	2008–Dec-30	Sepahan	2–1	Esteghlal	Navidkia (10), Alizadeh (25 o.g.)	Borhani (74)	Isfahan	2008–09 Persian Gulf Cup
52	2009–Aug-7	Esteghlal	1–0	Sepahan	Ravankhah (61)	–	Tehran	2009–10 Persian Gulf Cup
53	2009–Dec-5	Sepahan	2–0	Esteghlal	Mohammed (45), Aghili (63 p.)	–	Isfahan	2009–10 Persian Gulf Cup
54	2010–Aug-27	Esteghlal	4–3	Sepahan	Meydavoudi (18, 43), Majidi (25), Enayati (82 o.g.)	Beikzadeh (61), Janjuš (72, 75)	Tehran	2010–11 Persian Gulf Cup
55	2011–Feb-24	Sepahan	1–1	Esteghlal	Jamshidian (38)	Seyed-Salehi (90)	Isfahan	2010–11 Persian Gulf Cup
56	2011–Aug-3	Sepahan	1–1	Esteghlal	Januário (64)	Borhani (85)	Isfahan	2011–12 Persian Gulf Cup
57	2012–Jan-6	Esteghlal	1–1	Sepahan	Shirzad (32)	Seyed-Salehi (53)	Tehran	2011–12 Persian Gulf Cup
59	2012–Nov-18	Sepahan	0–1	Esteghlal	–	Heydari (15)	Isfahan	2012–13 Persian Gulf Cup
61	2013–Apr-15	Esteghlal	1–1	Sepahan	Irannejad (93 o.g.)	Navidkia (66)	Tehran	2012–13 Persian Gulf Cup
62	2013–Aug-1	Esteghlal	1–2	Sepahan	Sadeghi (78)	Afshin (2), Aghili (55 p.)	Tehran	2013–14 Persian Gulf Cup
63	2013–Dec-5	Sepahan	0–0	Esteghlal	–	–	Isfahan	2013–14 Persian Gulf Cup
64	2014–Aug-14	Sepahan	3–1	Esteghlal	Hajsafi (27 p.), Sharifi (33), Chimba (63)	Fakhreddini (17)	Isfahan	2014–15 Persian Gulf Pro League
65	2015–Feb-30	Esteghlal	2–1	Sepahan	Enayati (8), Ebrahimi (90+2)	Papi (42)	Tehran	2014–15 Persian Gulf Pro League
66	2015–Oct-26	Sepahan	0–3	Esteghlal	–	Esmaeili (6), Ansari (54), Barzay (77)	Isfahan	2015–16 Persian Gulf Pro League
67	2016–Apr-10	Esteghlal	0–0	Sepahan	–	–	Tehran	2015–16 Persian Gulf Pro League
68	2016–Dec-25	Sepahan	1–1	Esteghlal	Alimohammadi (70)	Barzay (90+2)	Isfahan	2016–17 Persian Gulf Pro League
69	2017–May-4	Esteghlal	2–1	Sepahan	Ansari (59), Bagheri (84)	Mohammadi (41)	Tehran	2016–17 Persian Gulf Pro League
70	2017–Dec-6	Esteghlal	3–0	Sepahan	A. Ghorbani (4), Djeparov (36, 47)	–	Tehran	2017–18 Persian Gulf Pro League
71	2018–Apr-27	Sepahan	0–1	Esteghlal	–	Thiam (11)	Isfahan	2017–18 Persian Gulf Pro League
72	2018–Oct-26	Esteghlal	0–1	Sepahan	–	Kiros (80)	Tehran	2018–19 Persian Gulf Pro League
73	2019–Apr-12	Sepahan	0–1	Esteghlal	–	Patosi (90+7)	Isfahan	2018–19 Persian Gulf Pro League
74	2019–Nov-30	Sepahan	2–2	Esteghlal	Gvelesiani (14), Noorafkan (90+5)	Ghayedi (57), Diabaté (79)	Isfahan	2019–20 Persian Gulf Pro League
75	2020–Aug-2	Esteghlal	2–1	Sepahan	Diabaté (52 p.), Mosleh (65 o.g.)	Mo. Mohebi (82)	Tehran	2019–20 Persian Gulf Pro League
77	2021–Feb-14	Sepahan	2–0	Esteghlal	Shahbazzadeh (14), Rafiei (35)	–	Isfahan	2020–21 Persian Gulf Pro League
78	2021–Jul-30	Esteghlal	1–2	Sepahan	Mehdipour (90+1)	Mirzaei (54), Shahbazzadeh (85)	Tehran	2020–21 Persian Gulf Pro League
79	2021–Dec-14	Esteghlal	1–0	Sepahan	J. Salmani 35'	–	Tehran	2021–22 Persian Gulf Pro League
80	2022–May-4	Sepahan	1–1	Esteghlal	Gvelesiani (14 p.)	Daneshgar (6)	Isfahan	2021–22 Persian Gulf Pro League
81	2022–Aug-12	Esteghlal	0–2	Sepahan	–	Y. Salmani (53), Rezaeian (57)	Tehran	2022–23 Persian Gulf Pro League
82	2023–Feb-19	Sepahan	2–1	Esteghlal	Nourafkan (50), Rezaeian (90+5 p.)	Motahari (58)	Isfahan	2022–23 Persian Gulf Pro League
83	2024–Aug-24	Sepahan	1–0	Esteghlal	Asadi (45+9)	–	Isfahan	2023–24 Persian Gulf Pro League
84	2024–Feb-27	Esteghlal	1–0	Sepahan	Cheshmi (36)	–	Tehran	2023–24 Persian Gulf Pro League
85	2025–Jan-2	Esteghlal	1–1	Sepahan	Juma (22)	Limouchi (73)	Tehran	2024–25 Persian Gulf Pro League
86	2025–May-15	Sepahan	3–1	Esteghlal	Rezaei (36), Me. Mohebi (76), Ben Yedder (88)	Eslami (11)	Isfahan	2024–25 Persian Gulf Pro League
88	2026–Jan-1	Sepahan	1–2	Esteghlal	Ashurmatov (14 o.g.)	Asani (10 p.), Gholizadeh (90+2)	Isfahan	2025–26 Persian Gulf Pro League
89	2026–Aug-23	Esteghlal	2–0	Sepahan	Asani (4), Gholizadeh (10)	–	Tehran	2026–27 Persian Gulf Pro League

== Iranian Cup ==
=== Hazfi Cup ===
No.	Date	Home team	Score	Away team	Home goal scorers	Away goal scorers	Venue	Season	Round
31	2002–Jun-7	Sepahan	4–2	Esteghlal	Stepanyan (17, 48 p., 50), Karimi Sibaki (55)	Akbari (57), Mousavi (64)	Isfahan	2001–02	Semi Final
32	2002–Jun-11	Esteghlal	3–1	Sepahan	Akbari (13 p.), Fatemi (78), Momenzadeh (82)	Bezik (90)	Tehran	2001–02	Semi Final
34	2003–Feb-15	Sepahan	3–0	Esteghlal	Farshbaf (52, 72), Seyed-Salehi (84)	–	Isfahan	2002–03	Round of 16
36	2003–May-15	Esteghlal	0–1	Sepahan	–	Seyed-Salehi (35)	Tehran	2002–03	Round of 16
40	2004–Jul-2	Sepahan	3–2	Esteghlal	Stepanyan (9), Khorramgah (57 o.g.), Hashemizadeh (87)	Akbari (27), Enayati (80)	Isfahan	2003–04	Final
41	2004–Jul-7	Esteghlal	0–2	Sepahan	–	Seyed-Salehi (25, 68)	Tehran	2003–04	Final
60	2013–Mar-30	Esteghlal	1–1 (4–5p.)	Sepahan	Hatami (64)	Khalatbari (42)	Tehran	2012–13	Semi Final
76	2020–Oct-10	Esteghlal	2–0	Sepahan	Ghafouri (45+7 p.), A. Karimi (61)	–	Tehran	2019–20	Quarter Final

== AFC Champions League ==
No.	Date	Home team	Score	Away team	Home goal scorers	Away goal scorers	Venue	Competition	Round
58	2012–May-22	Sepahan	2–0	Esteghlal	Correa (8), Bengar (35)	–	Isfahan	2012 AFC Champions League	Round of 16

== Friendlies and Exhibitions ==
No.	Date	Home team	Score	Away team	Home goal scorers	Away goal scorers	Venue	Competition
13	1993–Apr-23	Sepahan	2–2	Esteghlal	Tartar (62, 70)	Alami (37), Sarkhab (78)	Isfahan	Naghsh-Jahan Cup
18	1996–May-2	Sepahan	1–0	Esteghlal	Loveynian (33)	–	Isfahan	Naghsh-Jahan Cup
37	2003–Aug-20	Esteghlal	2–3	Sepahan	Fabrizio (22), Navazi (35)	Khatibi (1, 75), Bezik (81)	Tehran	Etehadiyeh Cup
87	2025–Jul-26	Esteghlal	1–1	Sepahan	Azadi (22)	Haji Eydi (10)	Erzurum	Friendly

== Summary of results ==
Tournament	Matches	Wins		Draws	Goals	
Tournament	Matches	Eateghlal	Sepahan	Draws	Esteghlal	Sepahan
League	75	31	25	20	98	82
Hazfi Cup	8	2	5	1	10	15
AFC Champions League	1	0	1	0	0	2
Total Official Matches	85	33	31	21	108	99
Exhibition games	4	0	2	2	5	7
Grand Total	89	33	33	23	113	106

=== Head-to-head ranking in Iranian Leagues (1970–2025) ===
P.	71	72	74	75	76	77	78	90	92	93	94	95	96	97	98	99	00	01	02	03	04	05	06	07	08	09	10	11	12	13	14	15	16	17	18	19	20	21	22	23	24	25
1	1			1				1							1			1		1			1			1	1	1	1	1		1							1			
2			2						2			2				2	2		2		2				2			2						2		2	2	2		2	2	2
3		3											3	3		3						3					3		3	3			3		3	3		3	3	3	3	
4					4	4	4										4							4		4					4											
5		5								5			5											5							5			5			5					
6									6					6	6						6											6										
7																		7					7																			
8																																										
9																			9	9																						9
10				10																		10																				
11					11						11	11																					11									
12																																										
13							13	13																	13																	
14						14																													14							
15																																										
16																																										
17																																										
18																																										

• Total: Esteghlal with 26 higher finishes, Sepahan with 12 higher finishes (till end of the 2024–25 Persian Gulf Pro League)

=== Stadiums ===
As of 23 August 2026

Rivalry stadiums
Stadium	Location	Matches	Esteghlal wins	Draws	Sepahan wins
Azadi Stadium	Tehran	34	18	8	8
Naghsh-e Jahan Stadium	Isfahan	16	4	5	9
Fuladshahr Stadium	Fuladshahr	11	2	3	6
22 Bahman Stadium	Isfahan	11	4	3	4
Shahid Shiroudi Stadium	Tehran	5	2	1	2
Bagh Homayoun Stadium	Isfahan	5	2	1	2
Takhti Stadium	Tehran	3	1	0	2
Takhti Stadium	Isfahan	1	0	0	1
Shohada-ye Shahr-e Qods Stadium	Qods County	2	1	1	0
Training Camp	Erzurum	1	0	1	0
Total		89	33	23	33

== Records ==
Friendly matches are not included in the following records unless otherwise noted.

=== Results ===
==== Biggest wins (+3 goals difference) ====
Winning margin	Home team	Result	Away team	Date	Competition
4	Sepahan	0–4	**Esteghlal**	28 January 1972	League
3	Sepahan	1–4	**Esteghlal**	14 October 1999	League
3	**Esteghlal**	3–0	Sepahan	14 May 2002	League
3	**Sepahan**	3–0	Esteghlal	15 February 2003	Hazfi Cup
3	Sepahan	0–3	**Esteghlal**	26 October 2015	League
3	**Esteghlal**	3–0	Sepahan	6 December 2017	League

==== Most goals in a match ====
Goals	Home team	Result	Away team	Date	Competition
7	Esteghlal	4–3	Sepahan	27 August 2010	League
6	Esteghlal	3–3	Sepahan	10 July 1977	League
6	Sepahan	4–2	Esteghlal	7 June 2002	Hazfi Cup
5	Esteghlal	3–2	Sepahan	28 July 1994	League
5	Sepahan	1–4	Esteghlal	14 October 1999	League
5	Esteghlal	2–3	Sepahan	3 November 2002	League
5	Sepahan	3–2	Esteghlal	24 April 2003	League
5	Sepahan	3–2	Esteghlal	2 July 2004	Hazfi Cup

==== Most consecutive wins ====
Games	Club	Period
4	Sepahan	3 November 2002 – 15 May 2003
3	Esteghlal	28 January 1972 – 11 April 1974
3	Esteghlal	4 February 2001 – 14 May 2002
3	Sepahan	20 April 2007 – 29 March 2008
3	Esteghlal	4 May 2017 – 27 April 2018
3	Sepahan	12 August 2022 – 24 August 2024

==== Most consecutive draws ====
Games	Period
3	24 February 2011 – 6 January 2012

==== Most consecutive without a draw ====
Games	Period
9	4 February 2001 – 15 May 2003
7	13 January 1976 – 9 November 1995

==== Longest unbeaten runs ====
Games	Club	Period
10 (7 wins)	Esteghlal	25 December 1997 – 14 May 2002
7 (5 wins)	Esteghlal	30 February 2015 – 27 April 2018
5 (4 wins)	Sepahan	3 November 2002 – 30 November 2003
5 (4 wins)	Sepahan	20 April 2007 – 30 December 2008
5 (2 wins)	Sepahan	30 March 2013 – 14 August 2014

==== Most consecutive games scoring ====
Games	Club	Period
14	Esteghlal	19 December 1996 – 3 November 2002
13	Sepahan	12 April 2004 – 30 December 2008

==== Most consecutive without conceding a goal ====
Games	Club	Period
3	Esteghlal	28 January 1972 – 11 April 1974
3	Sepahan	1 November 1974 – 14 November 1975
3	Esteghlal	4 February 2001 – 14 May 2002

=== Players ===
==== Goal scorers ====
- Does not include friendly matches.
- Players in **bold** are still active for Esteghlal or Sepahan.

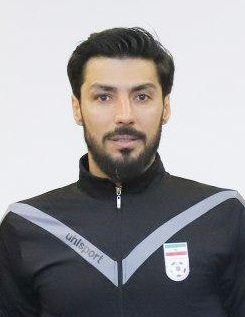
Mehdi Seyed-Salehi one of top scorers of rivalries

Pos	Player	Club(s)	League	Cup	Asia	Total
1	(Armenia) Levon Stepanyan	Sepahan	2	4	–	6
1	(Iran) Mehdi Seyed-Salehi	Sepahan Esteghlal	1 1	4 –	–	6
3	(Iran) Amin Mousavi	Sepahan	5	–	–	5
3	(Iran) Moharram Navidkia	Sepahan	5	–	–	5
3	(Iran) Reza Enayati	Esteghlal	4	1	–	5
3	(Iran) Yadollah Akbari	Esteghlal	2	3	–	5
7	(Iran) Gholam Hossein Mazloumi	Esteghlal	4	–	–	4
7	(Iran) Rasoul Khatibi	Sepahan	4	–	–	4
9	(Iran) Farhad Majidi	Esteghlal	3	–	–	3
9	(Iran) Hadi Aghili	Sepahan	3	–	–	3
11	(Iran) Ali Jabbari	Esteghlal	2	–	–	2
11	(Iran) Shahrokh Bayani	Esteghlal	2	–	–	2
11	(Iran) Mehdi Fonounizadeh	Esteghlal	2	–	–	2
11	(Iran) Karim Ghanbari	Sepahan	2	–	–	2
11	(Iran) Alireza Mansourian	Esteghlal	2	–	–	2
11	(Iran) Majid Basirat	Sepahan	2	–	–	2
11	(Iran) Alireza Akbarpour	Esteghlal	2	–	–	2
11	(Iran) Sattar Hamedani	Esteghlal	2	–	–	2
11	(Iran) Alireza Vahedi Nikbakht	Esteghlal	2	–	–	2
11	(Iran) Mohammad Navazi	Esteghlal	2	–	–	2
11	(Iran) Ali Samereh	Esteghlal	2	–	–	2
11	(Iran) Meysam Baou	Esteghlal	2	–	–	2
11	(Iraq) Abdul-Wahab Abu Al-Hail	Sepahan	2	–	–	2
11	(Iran) Mehdi Jafarpour	Sepahan	2	–	–	2
11	(Iran) Pirouz Ghorbani	Esteghlal	2	–	–	2
11	(Iran) Milad Meydavoudi	Esteghlal	2	–	–	2
11	(Serbia) Milorad Janjuš	Sepahan	2	–	–	2
11	(Iran) Arash Borhani	Esteghlal	2	–	–	2
11	(Iran) Amir Hossein Sadeghi	Esteghlal	2	–	–	2
11	(Iran) **Ehsan Hajsafi**	Sepahan	2	–	–	2
11	(Iran) Behnam Barzay	Esteghlal	2	–	–	2
11	(Iran) Jaber Ansari	Esteghlal	2	–	–	2
11	(Uzbekistan) Server Djeparov	Esteghlal	2	–	–	2
11	(Mali) Cheick Diabaté	Esteghlal	2	–	–	2
11	(Iran) Sajjad Shahbazzadeh	Sepahan	2	–	–	2
11	(Georgia (country)) Giorgi Gvelesiani	Sepahan	2	–	–	2
11	(Iran) **Omid Noorafkan**	Sepahan	2	–	–	2
11	(Iran) Ramin Rezaeian	Sepahan	2	–	–	2
11	(Albania) **Jasir Asani**	Esteghlal	2	–	–	2
11	(Iran) **Esmaeil Gholizadeh**	Esteghlal	2	–	–	2
11	(Iran) Edmond Bezik	Sepahan	1	1	–	2
11	(Iran) Faraz Fatemi	Esteghlal	1	1	–	2
11	(Iran) Ahmad Momenzadeh	Sepahan Esteghlal	1 0	– 1	–	2
11	(Iran) Mahmoud Karimi Sibaki	Sepahan	1	1	–	2
11	(Iran) Nasser Farshbaf	Sepahan	–	2	–	2
46	(Iran) Masoud Mojdehi	Esteghlal	1	–	–	1
46	(Iran) Karo Haghverdian	Esteghlal	1	–	–	1
46	(Iran) Mostafa Heydari	Sepahan	1	–	–	1
46	(Iran) Hamid Nadimian	Sepahan	1	–	–	1
46	(Iran) Hassan Ebrahimi	Esteghlal	1	–	–	1
46	(Iran) Reza Saffarpour	Sepahan	1	–	–	1
46	(Iran) Hassan Nazari	Esteghlal	1	–	–	1
46	(Iran) Hadi Naraghi	Esteghlal	1	–	–	1
46	(Iran) Hassan Rowshan	Esteghlal	1	–	–	1
46	(Iran) Amirhossein Shah Zeydi	Sepahan	1	–	–	1
46	(Iran) Rasoul Khorvash	Sepahan	1	–	–	1
46	(Iran) Alireza Rahimi	Sepahan	1	–	–	1
46	(Iran) Taghi Jahani	Sepahan	1	–	–	1
46	(Iran) Ramin Shahmohammadi	Sepahan	1	–	–	1
46	(Iran) Mohammad Javad Nadafi	Esteghlal	1	–	–	1
46	(Iran) Javad Zarincheh	Esteghlal	1	–	–	1
46	(Iran) Ali Akbarian	Esteghlal	1	–	–	1
46	(Iran) Mohammad Taghavi	Esteghlal	1	–	–	1
46	(Iran) Houshang Loveynian	Sepahan	1	–		1
46	(Iran) Hamid Memarian	Sepahan	1	–	–	1
46	(Iran) Sadegh Varmazyar	Esteghlal	1	–	–	1
46	(Iran) Mehdi Pashazadeh	Esteghlal	1	–	–	1
46	(Iran) Masoud Khademi	Sepahan	1	–	–	1
46	(Iran) Mohsen Garousi	Esteghlal	1	–	–	1
46	(Iran) Ali Latifi	Esteghlal	1	–	–	1
46	(Iran) Behzad Dadashzadeh	Esteghlal	1	–	–	1
46	(Iran) Abdollah Veisi	Sepahan	1	–	–	1
46	(Iran) Mohammad Niksirat	Esteghlal	1	–	–	1
46	(Iran) Davoud Dehghani	Sepahan	1	–	–	1
46	(Iran) Mehdi Hasheminasab	Esteghlal	1	–	–	1
46	(Iran) Sirous Dinmohammadi	Esteghlal	1	–	–	1
46	(Iran) Afshin Hajipour	Sepahan	1	–	–	1
46	(Iran) Saeed Ramezani	Sepahan	1	–	–	1
46	(Iran) Siavash Akbarpour	Esteghlal	1	–	–	1
46	(Iran) Javad Maheri	Sepahan	1	–	–	1
46	(Iran) Omid Ravankhah	Esteghlal	1	–	–	1
46	(Iraq) Emad Mohammed	Sepahan	1	–	–	1
46	(Iran) Hashem Beikzadeh	Sepahan	1	–	–	1
46	(Iran) Ahmad Jamshidian	Sepahan	1	–	–	1
46	(Brazil) Fábio Januário	Sepahan	1	–	–	1
46	(Iran) Javad Shirzad	Esteghlal	1	–	–	1
46	(Iran) Khosro Heydari	Esteghlal	1	–	–	1
46	(Iran) Arash Afshin	Sepahan	1	–	–	1
46	(Iran) Milad Fakhreddini	Esteghlal	1	–	–	1
46	(Iran) Mehdi Sharifi	Sepahan	1	–	–	1
46	(Brazil) Luciano Pereira	Sepahan	1	–	–	1
46	(Iran) Hossein Papi	Sepahan	1	–	–	1
46	(Iran) Omid Ebrahimi	Esteghlal	1	–	–	1
46	(Iran) Farshid Esmaeili	Esteghlal	1	–	–	1
46	(Iran) Jalaleddin Alimohammadi	Sepahan	1	–	–	1
46	(Iran) Mehrdad Mohammadi	Sepahan	1	–	–	1
46	(Iran) Farshid Bagheri	Esteghlal	1	–	–	1
46	(Iran) (Azerbaijan) Ali Ghorbani	Esteghlal	1	–	–	1
46	(Senegal) Mame Thiam	Esteghlal	1	–	–	1
46	(Brazil) Kiros Stanlley	Sepahan	1	–	–	1
46	(South Africa) Ayanda Patosi	Esteghlal	1	–	–	1
46	(Iran) Mehdi Ghayedi	Esteghlal	1	–	–	1
46	(Iran) Mohammad Mohebi	Sepahan	1	–	–	1
46	(Iran) Soroush Rafiei	Sepahan	1	–	–	1
46	(Iran) Reza Mirzaei	Sepahan	1	–	–	1
46	(Iran) Mehdi Mehdipour	Esteghlal	1	–	–	1
46	(Iran) Jafar Salmani	Esteghlal	1	–	–	1
46	(Iran) Mohammad Daneshgar	Esteghlal	1	–	–	1
46	(Iran) Yasin Salmani	Sepahan	1	–	–	1
46	(Iran) Amir Arsalan Motahari	Esteghlal	1	–	–	1
46	(Iran) Reza Asadi	Sepahan	1	–	–	1
46	(Iran) **Rouzbeh Cheshmi**	Esteghlal	1	–	–	1
46	(Kenya) Masoud Juma	Esteghlal	1	–	–	1
46	(Iran) **Mehdi Limouchi**	Sepahan	1	–	–	1
46	(Iran) **Mohammad Hossein Eslami**	Esteghlal	1	–	–	1
46	(Iran) **Kaveh Rezaei**	Sepahan	1	–	–	1
46	(Iran) Mohammad Mehdi Mohebi	Sepahan	1	–	–	1
46	(France) Wissam Ben Yedder	Sepahan	1	–	–	1
46	(Iran) Ali Mousavi	Esteghlal	–	1	–	1
46	(Iran) Morteza Hashemizadeh	Sepahan	–	1	–	1
46	(Iran) Mohammad Reza Khalatbari	Sepahan	–	1	–	1
46	(Iran) Farzad Hatami	Esteghlal	–	1	–	1
46	(Iran) Vouria Ghafouri	Esteghlal	–	1	–	1
46	(Iran) Ali Karimi	Esteghlal	–	1	–	1
46	(Brazil) Bruno Correa	Sepahan	–	–	1	1
46	(Iran) Mohsen Bengar	Sepahan	–	–	1	1

==== Top scorers by competition ====
Competition	Player	Club(s)	Goals
League	(Iran) Amin Mousavi	Sepahan	5
League	(Iran) Moharram Navidkia	Sepahan	5
Hazfi Cup	(Armenia) Levon Stepanyan	Sepahan	4
Hazfi Cup	(Iran) Mehdi Seyed-Salehi	Sepahan	4
AFC Champions League	(Brazil) Bruno Correa	Sepahan	1
AFC Champions League	(Iran) Mohsen Bengar	Sepahan	1

==== Most consecutive goalscoring ====
Player	Club	Consecutive matches	Total goals in the run	Start	End
(Iran) Gholamhossein Mazloumi	Esteghlal	3	4	1971–72 Local League (first leg)	1974–75 Takht Jamshid Cup (first leg)

==== Most clean sheets ====
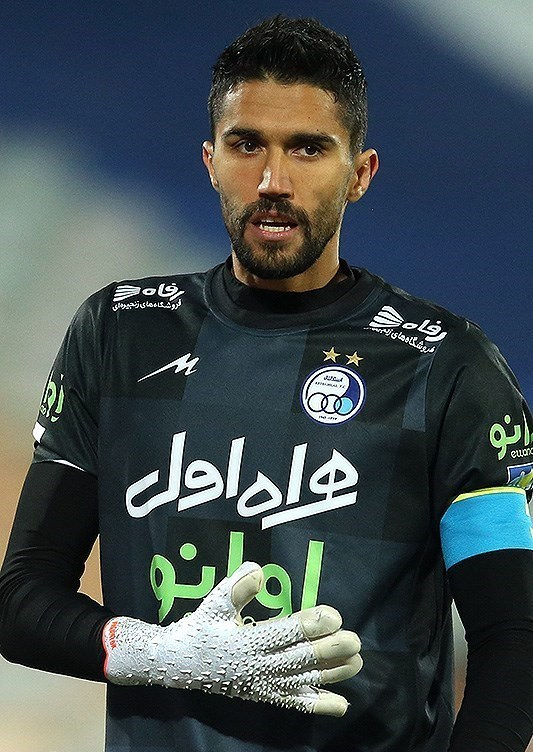
Hossein Hosseini, one of three goalkeepers who kept most clean sheets of rivalries.

- Players in **bold** are still active for Esteghlal or Sepahan.

Player	Club(s)	Period	CS	Total
(Armenia) Armenak Petrosyan	Sepahan	1996–2003, 2005–07	5	5
(Iran) Mehdi Rahmati	Sepahan Esteghlal	2009–11 2011–14, 2015–19	1 4	5
(Iran) **Hossein Hosseini**	Esteghlal	2016–25	5	5
(Iran) Payam Niazmand	Sepahan	2018–21, 2022–25	4	4
(Iran) Nasser Hejazi	Esteghlal	1969–76	3	3
(Iran) Mohammad Barzmehri	Sepahan	1969–76	3	3
(Iran) Hadi Tabatabaei	Esteghlal	1999–2003	3	3
(Iran) Rahman Ahmadi	Sepahan	2011–12, 2013–16	3	3

==== Most consecutive clean sheets ====
Player	Club	Consecutive matches	Start	End
(Iran) Nasser Hejazi	Esteghlal	3	1971–72 Local League (first leg)	1974–75 Takht Jamshid Cup (first leg)
(Iran) Mohammad Barzmehri	Sepahan	3	1974–75 Takht Jamshid Cup (second leg)	1975–76 Takht Jamshid Cup (second leg)
(Iran) Hadi Tabatabaei	Esteghlal	3	2000–01 Azadegan League (second leg)	2001–02 Iran Pro League (second leg)

=== Hat-tricks ===
A hat-trick is achieved when the same player scores three or more goals in one match. Listed in chronological order.

Seq.	Player	Time of goals	For	Final score	Date	Tournament
1.	(Iran) Amin Mousavi	41', 59', 90+1'	Sepahan	3–1 (H)	11 November 1994	1994–95 Azadegan League
2.	(Armenia) Levon Stepanyan	17', 48', 55'	Sepahan	4–2 (H)	7 June 2002	2001–02 Hazfi Cup

=== Braces ===
- Does not include friendly matches.

A Brace is achieved when the same player scores two goals in one match. Listed in chronological order.

Seq.	Player	Time of goals	For	Final score	Date	Tournament
1.	(Iran) Shahrokh Bayani	25', 38'	Esteghlal	3–1 (H)	28 February 1992	1991–92 Azadegan League
2.	(Iran) Afshin Hajipour	10', 32'	Sepahan	3–2 (A)	3 November 2002	2002–03 Iran Pro League
3.	(Iran) Nasser Farshbaf	52', 72'	Sepahan	3–0 (H)	15 February 2003	2002–03 Hazfi Cup
4.	(Iran) Moharram Navidkia	43', 48'	Sepahan	3–2 (H)	24 April 2003	2002–03 Iran Pro League
5.	(Iran) Mehdi Seyed-Salehi	25', 68'	Sepahan	2–0 (A)	7 July 2004	2003–04 Hazfi Cup
6.	(Iran) Rasoul Khatibi	62', 84'	Sepahan	2–2 (A)	20 June 2005	2004–05 Iran Pro League
7.	(Iran) Meysam Baou	39', 90'	Esteghlal	2–1 (H)	1 December 2006	2006–07 Persian Gulf Cup
8.	(Iraq) Abdul-Wahab Abu Al-Hail	7', 90'	Sepahan	2–1 (H)	7 October 2007	2007–08 Persian Gulf Cup
9.	(Iran) Milad Meydavoudi	18', 43'	Esteghlal	4–3 (H)	27 August 2010	2010–11 Persian Gulf Cup
10.	(Serbia) Milorad Janjuš	72', 75'	Sepahan	3–4 (A)	27 August 2010	2010–11 Persian Gulf Cup
11.	(Uzbekistan) Server Djeparov	36', 47'	Esteghlal	3–0 (H)	6 December 2017	2017–18 Persian Gulf Pro League

== Most successful coaches ==
Friendly matches are not included in the following records unless otherwise noted.

Rank	Head coach	Club	Matches	Win	Lost	Win-Loss Differential	Winning rate
1	(Iran) Farhad Kazemi	Sepahan	10	7	1	+6	70%
2	(Serbia) Zdravko Rajkov	Esteghlal	7	4	2	+2	57%
3	(Germany) Winfried Schäfer	Esteghlal	4	3	1	+2	75%
4	(Portugal) José Morais	Sepahan	4	3	1	+2	75%
5	(Iran) Farhad Majidi	Esteghlal	5	3	1	+2	60%
6	(Russia) Yevgeni Skomorokhov	Esteghlal	2	2	0	+2	100%
7	(Iran) Mansour Pourheidari	Esteghlal	11	5	4	+1	45%
8	(Iran) Parviz Mazloumi	Esteghlal	7	2	1	+1	28%

Rules for classification: 1) Win-Loss Differential; 2) Number of Wins; 3) Winning rate; 4) Aggregate Goal Difference.

== General performances ==
=== Trophies ===
- Numbers with this background indicate the record in the competition.

Esteghlal	Competition	Sepahan
Domestic
9	Iranian Leagues	5
8	Iranian Hazfi Cup	5
1	Iranian Super Cup	1
1	Iran Championship Cup	1
19	Domestic aggregate	12
Asian
2	Asian Club Championship	—
2	Asian aggregate	—
21	Total aggregate	12

=== General information ===
Titles	Esteghlal	Sepahan
Club name after establishment	Docharkhe Savaran Sport Club	Shahin Isfahan Sport Club
Founding date	26 September 1945	5 October 1953
Stadium	Azadi Stadium	Naghsh-e Jahan Stadium
Capacity	78,116	75,000
Number of seasons in Iranian Leagues	41 (1 relegated)	39 (2 relegated)
Most goals scored in a season in Iranian League	70 (2008–09)	67 (2009–10)
Most points in a season in Iranian League	68 (2021–22)	67 (2009–10, 2011–12)
Number of Double wins (Iranian League and Iranian Hazfi Cup)	—	—
Most Consecutive League trophies	—	3 times in a row (Hat-trick) (Note: 2009–10, 2010–11, 2011–12)
Most Consecutive Hazfi Cup trophies	—	2 times in a row (Brace) (Note: 2005–06, 2006–07)

=== Awards ===
==== IFFHS award ====
The IFFHS Asian Player of the Year is an annual prize presented by International Federation of Football History & Statistics (IFFHS). It had originally been the predecessor of the AFC Player of the Year, but was revived in 2020.

Award	Esteghlal	Sepahan
1st	0	0
2nd	0	0
3rd	2 (Note: Samad Marfavi (1991), Mehdi Fonounizadeh (1992))	0
Total	2	0

==== AFC award ====
The AFC Player of the Year is an annual prize presented by Asian Football Confederation (AFC). It is awarded to the Asian player who has the best performance at AFC club(s) in a calendar year.

Award	Esteghlal	Sepahan
1st	0	0
2nd	0	0
3rd	2 (Note: Farhad Majidi (2010), Javad Nekounam (2013))	0
Total	2	0

==== Best Footballer in Asia ====
Best Footballer in Asia is an annual association football award organized and presented by Titan Sports. It is awarded to the player who had the best performance for Asian football during the calendar year.

Award	Esteghlal	Sepahan
1st	0	0
2nd	0	0
3rd	0	0
Total	0	0

==== League performances awards ====
Award	Esteghlal	Sepahan
Golden Boot	7 (Note: Gholam Hossein Mazloumi (1973–74, 1974–75), Ali Samereh (2000–01), Reza Enayati (2004–05, 2005–06), Arash Borhani (2008–09), Cheick Diabaté (2019–20))	6 (Note: Edmond Bezik (2002–03), Emad Mohammed (2009–10), Kiros Stanlley (2018–19), Sajjad Shahbazzadeh (2020–21), Shahriyar Moghanlou (2022–23, 2023–24))

== See also ==
- Football in Iran
- Esteghlal F.C.
- Sepahan F.C.
- Tehran Derby
- El Gilano
- Isfahan Derby
- Mashhad Derby
- Persepolis F.C.–Sepahan S.C. rivalry
- Persepolis F.C.–Tractor S.C. rivalry
- Major football rivalries
