= List of Tehran Derby matches =

This is a list of all matches contested between the two prominent Tehran clubs Esteghlal and Persepolis, a fixture known as Tehran Derby.

== Iranian League (Persian Gulf Pro League) ==
No.	Season	Date	Competition	Home team	Score	Away team	Home goal scorers	Away goal scorers
7	1970–71	17-01-1971	Iran Local League	Esteghlal	(1–1); 3–0 (Note: The original match was 1–1 until 75' when Persepolis players ground out. Football Federation declared the match 3–0 in favor of Esteghlal.)	Persepolis	A. Mojdehi (75)	Kalani (2)
9	1971–72	04-02-1972	Iran Local League	Persepolis	4–1	Esteghlal	Kalani (43, 90+3'), Iranpak (56), Khordbin (75)	A. Jabbari (73)
10	1971–72	23-03-1972	Iran Local League	Esteghlal	0–2	Persepolis	–	Iranpak (50), Kalani (89)
13	1973–74	07-09-1973	Takht Jamshid Cup	Persepolis	6–0	Esteghlal	Kalani (32), Soleimani (45, 56), Behzadi (50, 86, 90+2)	–
14	1973–74	09-12-1973	Takht Jamshid Cup	Esteghlal	1–1	Persepolis	A. Jabbari (70)	Behzadi (46)
15	1974–75	25-05-1974	Takht Jamshid Cup	Esteghlal	1–0	Persepolis	Rowshan (88)	–
16	1974–75	18-12-1974	Takht Jamshid Cup	Persepolis	2–1	Esteghlal	Iranpak (50), Haj Rahimipour (70)	Gh. Mazloomi (60)
17	1975–76	05-05-1975	Takht Jamshid Cup	Esteghlal	3–1	Persepolis	Gh. Mazloomi (11, 62), M. Mojdehi (47)	Iranpak (53)
18	1975–76	17-10-1975	Takht Jamshid Cup	Persepolis	2–0	Esteghlal	Fattahi (22), Haj Rahimipour (38)	–
19	1976–77	17-03-1976	Takht Jamshid Cup	Persepolis	1–1	Esteghlal	Khordbin (85)	M. Mojdehi (20)
20	1976–77	24-09-1976	Takht Jamshid Cup	Esteghlal	1–1	Persepolis	Naraghi (26)	Parvin (40)
21	1977–78	08-05-1977	Takht Jamshid Cup	Persepolis	0–3	Esteghlal	–	Asheri (45), Rowshan (83), Maragehchian (88)
22	1977–78	09-12-1977	Takht Jamshid Cup	Esteghlal	1–2	Persepolis	Rowshan (85)	Iranpak (15, 34)
33	1989–90	25-05-1990	Qods League	Esteghlal	2–1	Persepolis	Sarkhab (46), Marfavi (72)	Mirahmadian (12)
36	1991–92	05-03-1992	Azadegan League	Persepolis	0–2	Esteghlal	-	Marfavi (8), Varmazyar (15)
37	1991–92	29-05-1992	Azadegan League	Esteghlal	1–0	Persepolis	Marfavi (48)	-
39	1994–95	20-01-1995	Azadegan League	Esteghlal	(2–2); 3–0 (Note: The original match was 2–2 until 89' when Persepolis fans stormed into the ground. Football Federation declared the match 3–0 in favor of Esteghlal.)	Persepolis	Varmazyar (79 p.), Akhtar (87)	Pious (51 p.), Dadashzadeh (56)
40	1994–95	27-01-1995	Azadegan League	Persepolis	0–0	Esteghlal	-	-
41	1995–96	28-07-1995	Azadegan League	Persepolis	1–3	Esteghlal	Kermani Moghaddam (49)	Akhtar (7), Varmazyar (16 p.), Taghavi (36)
42	1995–96	29-12-1995	Azadegan League	Esteghlal	0–0	Persepolis	–	–
43	1996–97	18-10-1996	Azadegan League	Persepolis	1–0	Esteghlal	Bezik (87)	–
44	1996–97	11-07-1997	Azadegan League	Esteghlal	0–3	Persepolis	–	Bezik (30), Mahdavikia (71), Taherzadeh (87)
45	1998–99	13-11-1998	Azadegan League	Esteghlal	0–1	Persepolis	–	Hasheminasab (45)
46	1998–99	09-04-1999	Azadegan League	Persepolis	1–1	Esteghlal	Hasheminasab (3)	Malekian (43)
48	1999–00	24-09-1999	Azadegan League	Persepolis	0–0	Esteghlal	–	–
49	1999–00	27-02-2000	Azadegan League	Esteghlal	0–2	Persepolis	–	Hasheminasab (7), Rafat (80)
50	2000–01	29-12-2000	Azadegan League	Esteghlal	2–2	Persepolis	Navazi (67), Hasheminasab (86)	Rahbarifar (57 p.), Karimi (89)
51	2000–01	23-02-2001	Azadegan League	Persepolis	0–1	Esteghlal	–	Akbarpour (74)
52	2001–02	18-01-2002	Iran Pro League	Esteghlal	1–1	Persepolis	Navazi (38 p.)	R. Jabbari (25)
53	2001–02	09-05-2002	Iran Pro League	Persepolis	0–0	Esteghlal	–	–
54	2002–03	10-01-2003	Iran Pro League	Persepolis	1–1	Esteghlal	Ansarian (70 p.)	Samereh (1)
55	2002–03	13-06-2003	Iran Pro League	Esteghlal	1–2	Persepolis	Akbarpour (63)	Golmohammadi (11), Abolghasempour (50)
56	2003–04	17-10-2003	Iran Pro League	Persepolis	1–2	Esteghlal	Traoré (70)	Samereh (8), Fekri (57)
57	2003–04	02-02-2004	Iran Pro League	Esteghlal	1–1	Persepolis	Seyedabbasi (3)	Kavianpour (20)
58	2004–05	22-10-2004	Iran Pro League	Persepolis	0–0	Esteghlal	–	–
59	2004–05	25-02-2005	Iran Pro League	Esteghlal	3–2	Persepolis	Enayati (68), Fekri (83), P. Ghorbani (90+3)	Sh. Rezaei (74), Entezari (77)
60	2005–06	04-11-2005	Iran Pro League	Esteghlal	1–0	Persepolis	Enayati (56)	–
61	2005–06	10-03-2006	Iran Pro League	Persepolis	0–0	Esteghlal	–	–
62	2006–07	03-11-2006	Persian Gulf Cup	Persepolis	2–1	Esteghlal	Madanchi (22), Oladi (71)	Sadeghi (16)
63	2006–07	30-03-2007	Persian Gulf Cup	Esteghlal	1–1	Persepolis	Alizadeh (43)	Nikbakht (13)
64	2007–08	14-10-2007	Persian Gulf Cup	Esteghlal	1–1	Persepolis	Ravankhah (57)	Khalili (84)
65	2007–08	03-04-2008	Persian Gulf Cup	Persepolis	1–1	Esteghlal	Khalili (28)	Ravankhah (5)
66	2008–09	03-10-2008	Persian Gulf Cup	Persepolis	1–1	Esteghlal	Karimi (87)	Borhani (46)
67	2008–09	13-02-2009	Persian Gulf Cup	Esteghlal	1–1	Persepolis	M. Jabbari (56)	Zare (90+4 p.)
68	2009–10	02-10-2009	Persian Gulf Cup	Esteghlal	1–1	Persepolis	Majidi (55)	Kolahkaj (49)
69	2009–10	03-02-2010	Persian Gulf Cup	Persepolis	2–1	Esteghlal	Norouzi (37), Bagheri (87)	Majidi (16)
70	2010–11	15-10-2010	Persian Gulf Cup	Esteghlal	1–0	Persepolis	Majidi (90+1)	–
71	2010–11	30-03-2011	Persian Gulf Cup	Persepolis	0–1	Esteghlal	–	Borhani (43)
72	2011–12	16-09-2011	Persian Gulf Cup	Persepolis	0–2	Esteghlal	–	Majidi (15), M. Jabbari (81)
75	2011–12	02-02-2012	Persian Gulf Cup	Esteghlal	2–3	Persepolis	Meydavoudi (32), Zandi (50)	Zayed (82, 83, 90+2)
76	2012–13	24-08-2012	Persian Gulf Cup	Persepolis	0–0	Esteghlal	–	–
77	2012–13	25-01-2013	Persian Gulf Cup	Esteghlal	0–0	Persepolis	–	–
78	2013–14	06-09-2013	Persian Gulf Cup	Esteghlal	0–0	Persepolis	–	–
79	2013–14	17-01-2014	Persian Gulf Cup	Persepolis	0–0	Esteghlal	–	–
80	2014–15	23-11-2014	Persian Gulf Pro League	Esteghlal	1–2	Persepolis	Shahbazzadeh (44)	Nouri (72), Alishah (82)
81	2014–15	15-05-2015	Persian Gulf Pro League	Persepolis	1–0	Esteghlal	Alipour (65)	–
82	2015–16	30-10-2015	Persian Gulf Pro League	Esteghlal	1–1	Persepolis	Ansari (49)	Bengtson (90+6)
83	2015–16	15-04-2016	Persian Gulf Pro League	Persepolis	4–2	Esteghlal	Taremi (5, 35), Rezaeian (54), Mosalman (85)	Ansari (55), Ebrahimi (89 p.)
84	2016–17	16-09-2016	Persian Gulf Pro League	Persepolis	0–0	Esteghlal	–	–
85	2016–17	12-02-2017	Persian Gulf Pro League	Esteghlal	3–2	Persepolis	Esmaeili (18), A. Ghorbani (20), K. Rezaei (44)	Rafiei (5), Hosseini (90+3)
86	2017–18	26-10-2017	Persian Gulf Pro League	Persepolis	1–0	Esteghlal	Alipour (23 p.)	–
87	2017–18	01-03-2018	Persian Gulf Pro League	Esteghlal	1–0	Persepolis	Ghafouri (44)	–
89	2018–19	27-09-2018	Persian Gulf Pro League	Esteghlal	0–0	Persepolis	–	–
90	2018–19	30-03-2019	Persian Gulf Pro League	Persepolis	1–0	Esteghlal	Nourollahi (21)	–
91	2019–20	22-09-2019	Persian Gulf Pro League	Esteghlal	0–1	Persepolis	–	Abdi (81)
92	2019–20	06-02-2020	Persian Gulf Pro League	Persepolis	2–2	Esteghlal	Alipour (29), Resan (89)	Motahari (24, 52)
94	2020–21	11-01-2021	Persian Gulf Pro League	Esteghlal	2–2	Persepolis	Motahari (2), Ghayedi (90+3)	Abdi (51), Amiri (66)
95	2020–21	14-05-2021	Persian Gulf Pro League	Persepolis	1–0	Esteghlal	Alekasir (55)	–
97	2021–22	04-12-2021	Persian Gulf Pro League	Esteghlal	0–0	Persepolis	–	–
98	2021–22	17-03-2022	Persian Gulf Pro League	Persepolis	1–1	Esteghlal	Nemati (39)	Gestede (81)
99	2022–23	20-12-2022	Persian Gulf Pro League	Esteghlal	2–2	Persepolis	Cheshmi (30), Motahari (50)	Gvelesiani (16, 89)
100	2022–23	23-04-2023	Persian Gulf Pro League	Persepolis	1–0	Esteghlal	Alekasir (50)	
102	2023–24	14-12-2023	Persian Gulf Pro League	Persepolis	1–1	Esteghlal	Alishah (77)	Yamga (90+7 p.)
103	2023–24	13-03-2024	Persian Gulf Pro League	Esteghlal	0–0	Persepolis	–	–
104	2024–25	25-09-2024	Persian Gulf Pro League	Esteghlal	0–1	Persepolis	–	Kanaanizadegan (90+3 p.)
105	2024–25	27-02-2025	Persian Gulf Pro League	Persepolis	2–1	Esteghlal	Kanaanizadegan (45+4 p.), Alipour (71)	Koushki (55)
106	2025–26	05-12-2025	Persian Gulf Pro League	Persepolis	0–0	Esteghlal	–	–
107	2026–27	02-09-2026	Persian Gulf Pro League	Esteghlal	1–1	Persepolis	Asani (60)	Mohebi (50)

== Iranian Cups ==
=== Hazfi Cup ===
No.	Season	Date	Home team	Score	Away team	Home goal scorers	Away goal scorers	Round
31	1988–89	10-03-1989	Esteghlal	0–0 (2–4p.)	Persepolis	–	–	Quarter-final
47	1998–99	11-07-1999	Persepolis	2–1	Esteghlal	Hasheminasab (12 p.), Peyrovani (85)	Bakhtiarizadeh (50)	Final
74	2011–12	09-12-2011	Persepolis	0–3 (a.e.t.)	Esteghlal	–	M. Jabbari (95, 99 p.), Sharifat (107)	Quarter-final
93	2019–20	26-08-2020	Persepolis	2–2 (1–4p.)	Esteghlal	Resan (48), Alipour (89)	Ghayedi (4), Daneshgar (90+3)	Semi-final
96	2020–21	15-07-2021	Persepolis	0–0 (3–4p.)	Esteghlal	–	–	Quarter-final
101	2022–23	31-05-2023	Esteghlal	1–2 (a.e.t.)	Persepolis	Moradmand (90+11)	Torabi (30), Alishah (115)	Final

=== Super Cup ===
No.	Competition	Date	Home team	Score	Away team	Home goal scorers	Away goal scorers
88	2018 Super Cup	20-07-2018	Persepolis	(awarded); 3–0 (Note: The match was not played, because Esteghlal club refused to do it. Football Federation declared the match 3–0 in favor of Persepolis.)	Esteghlal	–	–

== Tehran Tournaments (Tehran Province League & Tehran Super Cup) ==
No.	Season	Date	Competition	Home team	Score	Away team	Home goal scorers	Away goal scorers
3	1968–69	10-01-1969	Tehran Tournament	Persepolis	0–0	Esteghlal	–	–
4	1968–69	22-08-1969	Tehran Province League	Esteghlal	3–1	Persepolis	Monshizadeh (8), A. Jabbari (44), Haghverdian (88)	Ganjapour (72)
5	1969–70	06-02-1970	Tehran Province League	Persepolis	(0–1); 0–3 (Note: The original match was 1–0 until 82' when Persepolis players ground out. Football Federation declared the match 3–0 in favor of Esteghlal.)	Esteghlal	–	Gh. Mazloomi (9)
8	1970–71	18-06-1971	Tehran Province League	Esteghlal	1–1	Persepolis	Gh. Mazloomi (30)	Iranpak (90+1)
11	1972–73	02-03-1973	Tehran Province League	Persepolis	0–2	Esteghlal	–	A. Jabbari (40, 87)
25	1981–82	08-10-1981	Tehran Province League	Esteghlal	0–0	Persepolis	–	–
26	1982–83	07-01-1983	Tehran Province League	Esteghlal	1–1	Persepolis	Fariba (87)	Fathabadi (10)
27	1983–84	07-10-1983	Tehran Province League	Persepolis	0–1	Esteghlal	–	P. Mazloomi (59)
28	1986–87	15-06-1986	Tehran Province League	Persepolis	3–0	Esteghlal	Bayani (12 p., 52), Mohammadkhani (62)	–
29	1987–88	27-03-1987	Tehran Province League	Esteghlal	0–0	Persepolis	–	–
30	1988–89	09-09-1988	Tehran Province League	Persepolis	1–1	Esteghlal	Pious (46)	Mokhtarifar (60)
32	1989–90	08-12-1989	Tehran Province League	Persepolis	1–0	Esteghlal	Abedian (18)	–
34	1990–91	18-01-1991	Tehran Province League	Esteghlal	1–1	Persepolis	Bayani (62 p.)	Pious (75)
35	1991–92	24-01-1992	Tehran Province League	Esteghlal	0–0	Persepolis	–	–
38	1992–93	01-01-1993	Tehran Super Cup	Esteghlal	0–0	Persepolis	–	–

== Friendlies and exhibitions ==
No.	Date	Competition	Home team	Score	Away team	Home goal scorers	Away goal scorers
1	05-04-1968	Friendly	Esteghlal	0–0	Persepolis	–	–
2	19-08-1968	Friendly	Persepolis	1–1	Esteghlal	Hamishejavan (84 p.)	Jaberizadeh (67)
6	25-07-1970	Friendly	Esteghlal	3–2	Persepolis	Ghorab (73), Haghverdian (87), A. Mojdehi (88)	Parvin (7), Kalani (23)
12	15-06-1973	Ettehad Cup	Esteghlal	1–0	Persepolis	Adelkhani (3)	–
23	16-11-1979	Friendly	Esteghlal	1–0	Persepolis	Fathabadi (42)	–
24	04-07-1980	Friendly	Persepolis	0–0	Esteghlal	–	–
73	07-11-2011	Velayat Cup	Persepolis	2–2	Esteghlal	Norouzi (7 p., 46)	Borhani (32), Omranzadeh (70)

== Summary of all matches ==
Tournament	Matches	Wins		Draws	Goals	
Tournament	Matches	Esteghlal	Persepolis	Draws	Esteghlal	Persepolis
Iranian League	78	18	24	36	68	85
Iranian Hazfi Cup	6	1	2	3	7	6
Iranian Super Cup	1	0	1	0	–	–
Tehran Competitions	15	4	2	9	13	9
Total Official Matches	100	23	29	48	88	100
Exhibition games	7	3	0	4	8	5
Grand Total	107	26	29	52	96	105
