= Adriano Alves =

Brazilian footballer (born 1977)

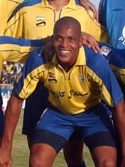
- Adriano Alves in 2005

Personal information
- Full name: Adriano Leonardo Alves
- Date of birth: January 5, 1977 (age 49)
- Place of birth: Vila Velha, Espírito Santo, Brazil
- Height: 1.80 m (5 ft 11 in)
- Position: Centre forward

Senior career*
Years	Team	Apps	(Gls)
- Central SC
- St. Pauli
2002	Shahab Zanjan		
2002–2006	Esteghlal Ahvaz	76	(18)
2005	→ Al Nasr Dubai (loan)		
2006–2007	Mes Kerman	28	(6)
2007–2008	Saipa	25	(5)
2008–2009	Damash Gilan	26	(12)
2009–2010	Malavan	30	(6)
Total		185	(47)
- * Club domestic league appearances and goals

Adriano Leonardo Alves (born January 5, 1977) is a retired Brazilian footballer. He was the first Brazilian to play in Iranian Football, where he played in the Premier Football League for eight seasons.

== Club career ==
Alves started his career at Brazilian side Central Sport Club where he managed local success in the Campeonato Pernambucano, he attracted interest from Azadegan League clubs who seek players from Brazil who are cheap relative to European players and skillful, Shahab Zanjan a newly formed club at the time signed Alves on November 21, 2002. Alves scored 2 goals in his debut for the club, and was soon spotted by IPL side Esteghlal Ahvaz whom he played for, for four years. In 2006, he was transferred to the newly promoted Iranian Premier League side Mes Kerman F.C. in which he has played a crucial role in the 2006–07 Persian Gulf Cup season. He was transferred to Saipa for 2007–08 season and later signed with Pegah in the summer 2008 transfer window. In the beginning of 2008–09 season Pegah was sold to Damash Iranian and named Damash Gilan. Despite having a good season in Damash by scoring 12 goals, Damash was relegated to the Azadegan League and Alvez joined to Malavan in summer 2009.

=== Club career statistics ===
- Last Update: 30 August 2011

Club performance			League		Cup		Continental		Total	
Season	Club	League	Apps	Goals	Apps	Goals	Apps	Goals	Apps	Goals
Iran			League		Hazfi Cup		Asia		Total	
2002–03	Esteghlal Ahvaz	Persian Gulf Cup	10	2	0	0	-	-	10	2
2003–04	Esteghlal Ahvaz	Persian Gulf Cup	24	8	0	0	-	-	24	8
2004–05	Esteghlal Ahvaz	Persian Gulf Cup	19	2	0	0	-	-	19	2
2005–06	Esteghlal Ahvaz	Persian Gulf Cup	23	6	0	0	-	-	23	6
2006–07	Mes	Persian Gulf Cup	28	6	2	2	-	-	30	8
2007–08	Saipa	Persian Gulf Cup	25	5	1	0	3	0	29	5
2008–09	Damash	Persian Gulf Cup	26	12	0	0	-	-	26	12
2009–10	Malavan	Persian Gulf Cup	29	6	1	0	-	-	30	6
2010–11	Malavan	Persian Gulf Cup	1	0	0	0	-	-	1	0
Career total			185	47	4	2	3	0	192	49

- Assist Goals

Season	Team	Assists
05–06	Esteghlal Ahvaz	2
06–07	Mes	5
07–08	Saipa	2
08–09	Damash	5
09–10	Malavan	1
10–11	Malavan	0
