= Reza Hassanzadeh (footballer, died 2006) =

Iranian footballer

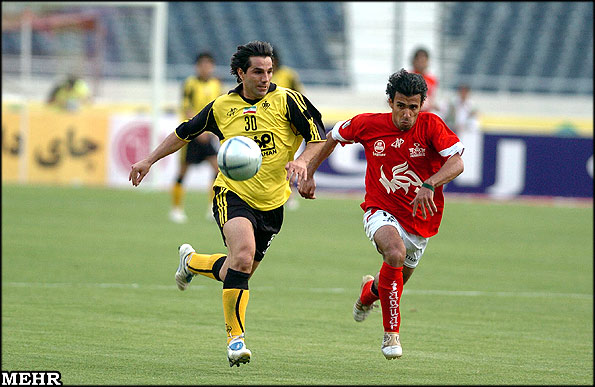
- (left)

Personal information
- Full name: Reza Hassanzadeh
- Date of birth: ?
- Place of birth: Tabriz, Iran
- Date of death: 2006
- Place of death: Asaloyeh, Iran
- Height: 1.81 m (5 ft 11 1/2 in)
- Position: Defender

Senior career*
Years	Team	Apps	(Gls)
- Mashin Sazi F.C.
- Tractor F.C.
- Sepahan F.C.
- Tractor F.C.

International career
	Iran	1	(0)
- * Club domestic league appearances and goals

Reza Hassanzadeh (Persian: رضا حسن‌زاده; ? in Tabriz – 2006 in Asaloyeh, Iran) was an Iranian football player who played for Tractor F.C. for most of his career. Also he was playing defender in Sepahan F.C. and won the Iran Pro League and Hazfi Cup with this team.

== Awards and honours ==
=== Club ===
Sepahan

- Iran Pro League (1): 2002–03
- Hazfi Cup (1): 2003–04
