= Moharram Navidkia =

Iranian retired footballer and coach (born 1982)

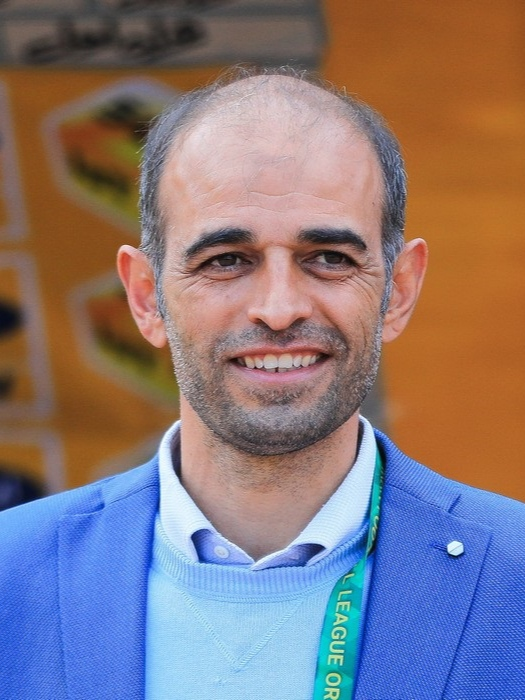
- Navidkia in 2021

Personal information
- Full name: Moharram Navidkia
- Date of birth: 1 November 1982 (age 43)
- Place of birth: Isfahan, Iran
- Height: 1.82 m (6 ft 0 in)
- Position: Attacking midfielder

Team information
- Current team: Sepahan (manager)

Youth career
- 1996–1998: Sepahan

Senior career*
Years	Team	Apps	(Gls)
1998–2004	Sepahan	106	(1)
2004–2006	VfL Bochum	10	(0)
2006–2016	Sepahan	176	(23)
Total		292	(41)

International career
2001–2003	Iran U23	14	(2)
2002–2009	Iran	25	(1)

Managerial career
- 2015: Sepahan (interim player-manager)
- 2020–2022: Sepahan
- 2024: Mes Rafsanjan
- 2025–: Sepahan
Medal record
Representing Iran
Asian Games
Gold medal – first place	2002 Busan	Team competition
- * Club domestic league appearances and goals

Moharram Navidkia (Persian: محرم نویدکیا; born 1 November 1982) is an Iranian football manager and former player who last coached Sepahan in Persian Gulf Pro League.

He played for Sepahan for 18 years and was its captain. He usually played as a midfielder. During his career, he dealt with consecutive injuries, which made him unable to regain his top form.

As an international player, he was the former captain of the Iran under-23 team and collected 25 caps for the senior team of Iran, before bidding his farewell in December 2009.

His brother, Rasoul Navidkia is also a professional footballer who plays for Sepahan.

== Early years ==
Navidkia was born in Isfahan, Iran. His original last name was Ghara Gozlu which he changed later to Navidkia. He is an ethnic Azeri originally from Marand, East Azerbaijan.

== Club career ==
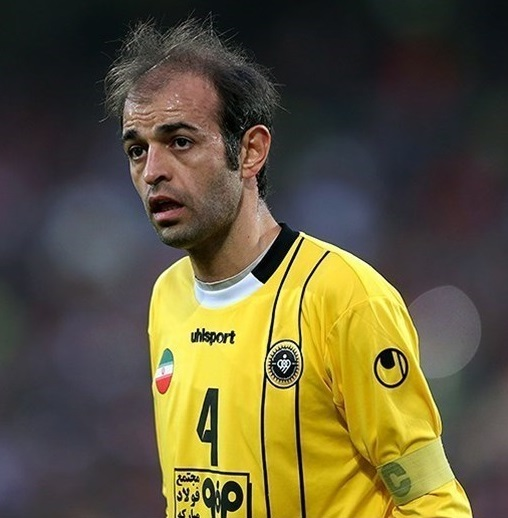
Navidkia with Sepahan in 2014

Navidkia began his career at Sepahan in 1998. From 1998 to 2002 he played as the defensive midfielder, while from 2002 and by the suggestion of Farhad Kazemi his playing post has been changed to attacking midfielder. He managed to attract attention during the 2002–03 Iran Premier League season while playing for a team many at first thought to be average, but they won the championship title at the end.

He was selected the best player of IPL for the 2003–04 season and was considered one of the best Iranian players despite his young age. Due to his potential talent, young age, and impressive performances, he was transferred to VfL Bochum even though he was injured at the time of the signing.

He was not able to recover his old form, and went back to Sepahan in 2006 on loan. After the 2006 FIFA World Cup in Germany, Navidkia signed a contract with Sepahan again. He had difficulties with the injuries during his career in Sepahan and finally in the 2009–10 season he had his most stable season after a few years. He retired from football on 17 October 2016, after playing 16 years at Sepahan.

== International career ==
Navidkia was first selected to the Iran national team during the West Asian Football Federation tournament in 2002, which was held in Syria. He made his debut for Iran against Jordan in August 2002. His biggest achievement was winning the gold medal of the 2002 Asian Games with Iran U-23 in Busan, where he continued his impressive display during the games. He played in the 2006 FIFA World Cup qualification for Team Melli.

Having been selected among Iran's reserve men for the 2006 FIFA World Cup, he was called up to join the team in Germany to replace injured Sattar Zare. He bid his farewell to national team in December 2009. In May 2011, he was called up to Iran national team by Carlos Queiroz, but he rejected the offer due to his "several injuries and surgeries" which makes him unable to play for both national team and club.

== Career statistics ==
=== Club ===
Appearances and goals by club, season and competition
Club	Season	League			National cup (Note: Includes Hazfi Cup, DFB-Pokal.)		Continental		Total	
Club	Season	Division	Apps	Goals	Apps	Goals	Apps	Goals	Apps	Goals
Sepahan	1998–99	Azadegan League	8	0			–		8	0
Sepahan	1999–2000	Azadegan League	10	0			–		10	0
Sepahan	2000–01	Azadegan League	18	0			–		18	0
Sepahan	2001–02	Iran Pro League	24	0			–		24	0
Sepahan	2002–03	Iran Pro League	24	12			–		24	12
Sepahan	2003–04	Iran Pro League	22	6			6	0	28	6
Sepahan	Total		106	18			6	0	112	18
VfL Bochum	2004–05	Bundesliga	0				–		0	0
VfL Bochum	2005–06	2. Bundesliga	10	0	2	0	–		12	0
VfL Bochum	Total		10	0	2	0			12	0
Sepahan	2005–06	Iran Pro League	11	3	4	0	–		15	3
Sepahan	2006–07	Iran Pro League	9	1	4	0	6	1	19	2
Sepahan	2007–08	Iran Pro League	8	1	0				8	1
Sepahan	2008–09	Iran Pro League	12	4	0		4	0	16	4
Sepahan	2009–10	Iran Pro League	20	0	1	0	5	0	26	0
Sepahan	2010–11	Iran Pro League	24	3	2	0	7	1	33	4
Sepahan	2011–12	Iran Pro League	29	2	1	0	9	0	39	2
Sepahan	2012–13	Iran Pro League	29	8	5	0	3	0	37	8
Sepahan	2013–14	Iran Pro League	5	1	0	0	4	0	9	1
Sepahan	2014–15	Iran Pro League	11	0	1	0	–		12	0
Sepahan	2015–16	Iran Pro League	11	0	2	0	1	0	14	0
Sepahan	2016–17	Iran Pro League	7	0	0		–		7	0
Sepahan	Total		176	23	20	0	39	2	235	43
Career total			292	41	22	0	45	2	359	43

=== International ===
Appearances and goals by national team and year
National team	Year	Apps	Goals
Iran	2002	7	0
Iran	2003	9	1
Iran	2004	2	0
Iran	2005	6	0
Iran	2006	1	0
Iran	2007	0	0
Iran	2008	0	0
Iran	2009	0	0
Total		25	1

Scores and results list Iran's goal tally first.

#	Date	Venue	Opponent	Score	Result	Competition
1	27 October 2003	Kim Il-Sung Stadium, Pyongyang	North Korea	3–1	3–1	2004 AFC Asian Cup qualification

== Managerial record ==
As of match played 23 June 2022

Managerial record by team and tenure
Team	From	To	Record					Ref.
Team	From	To	P	W	D	L	Win %	Ref.
Sepahan	6 September 2020	23 June 2022	71	39	19	13	54.93	
Mes Rafsanjan	3 February 2024	12 October 2024	26	9	10	7	34.62	
Total			97	48	29	20	49.48	

== Awards and honours ==
=== Player ===
Sepahan

- Iran Pro League (5): 2002–03, 2009–10, 2010–11, 2011–12, 2014–15
- Hazfi Cup (4): 2003–04, 2005–06, 2006–07, 2012–13
- AFC Champions League Runner-up: 2007

Iran U-23

- Asian Games: 2002

Iran

- WAFF Bronze medal: 2002

Individual

- Football Iran News & Events Player of the season: 2002–03, 2012–13
- Iranian Footballer of the Year: 2003, 2013

=== Manager ===
Sepahan

- Persian Gulf Pro League: Runner-up 2020–21

Mes Rafsanjan

- Hazfi Cup: Runner-up 2023–24
