= Naghsh-e-Jahan Derby =

Iranian football rivalry

- Other names: Isfahan Derby
- Location: Isfahan, Iran
- Teams: Sepahan; Zob Ahan
- First meeting: Sepahan 0–0 (5–4) Zob Ahan (1972 Jam-e-Enghelab)
- Latest meeting: Sepahan 4–1 Zob Ahan (21 February 2025) (2024–25 Persian Gulf Pro League)
- Stadiums: Naghsh-e-Jahan; Foolad Shahr

Statistics
- Total meetings: 76
- Most wins: 30 (Sepahan)
- Most player appearances: Moharram Navidkia (38)
- Top scorer: Mehdi Rajabzadeh; Moharram Navidkia (5 goals each)
- Largest victory: Sepahan 4–0 Zob Ahan (11 May 2003, 6 August 2012); Sepahan 0–4 Zob Ahan (21 January 2001)

Sepahan	Zob Ahan

The Naghsh-e-Jahan Derby, also known as the Isfahan Derby, is a football match between Sepahan and Zob Ahan, the two biggest teams of the city of Isfahan, Iran.

According to journalist Afshin Afshar, the competition is one of the most popular annual football events in Iran.

== History ==
The first match between Sepahan and Zob Ahan was played in the 1972 Jam-e-Enghelab football tournament, held in Isfahan. Sepahan won 5–4 in a thrilling penalty shoot-out after 120 minutes of play. Sepahan's goals were scored by Masoud Tabesh, Rasoul Khorosh, Hajrasouli, Chalangar and Yazdkhasti, while Zob Ahan's fifth penalty by Yazdanpanah was saved by Mohammad Borzmehri, who was known as the "Iranian Yashin". The two clubs then played each other annually in the Takht Jamshid Cup (1974/75, 1975/76, 1976/77 and 1977/78). The rivalry resumed in the 1990s when they faced each other in the Azadegan League (1993/94, 1996/97, 1997/98) and from then on, they met each other twice a year.

== All-time record ==
Tournament	Matches	Sepahan wins	Draws	Zob Ahan wins	Sepahan goals	Zob Ahan goals
Pro League	48	23	13	12	65	39
Azadegan League	12	5	4	3	13	13
Hazfi Cup	5	0	3	2	5	7
Takht Jamshid Cup	8	2	5	1	6	4
Other tournaments	3	0	2	1	2	3
Total	76	30	27	19	91	66

== All results ==
This list is incomplete; you can help by expanding it.

No.	Date	Result	Sepahan goals	Zob Ahan goals	Venue	Competition
1	1972	0(5)-0(4)			Bagh Homayoun Stadium	Jam-e-Enghelab
2	10 May 1974	0-0			Bagh Homayoun Stadium	Takht Jamshid Cup
3	22 November 1974	0-0			Bagh Homayoun Stadium	Takht Jamshid Cup
4	6 June 1975	0-0			Bagh Homayoun Stadium	Takht Jamshid Cup
5	1976	1-2			Bagh Homayoun Stadium	Takht Jamshid Cup
6	13 August 1976	2-1	Shahzeydi (47), Dehghan (62)	Khayati (78)	Bagh Homayoun Stadium	Takht Jamshid Cup
7	26 November 1976	0-0			Bagh Homayoun Stadium	Takht Jamshid Cup
8	7 April 1977	2-0	Veisi (65)(89)		Bagh Homayoun Stadium	Takht Jamshid Cup
9	27 September 1978	1-1	Rahimi (82)	Yazdkhasti (45)	Bagh Homayoun Stadium	Takht Jamshid Cup
10	7 March 1978	0-1			Bagh Homayoun Stadium	Hazfi Cup
11	7 March 1986	1-2	Nikobin (72)	Najafi (22), Banirashid (43)	Takhti Stadium	Isfahan Hazfi Cup
12	1993	0-2	-	Simakani (2 goals)	Takhti Stadium	Azadegan League
13	1994	0-3	-	Simakani, Hosseini, Agha-Hassani	Takhti Stadium	Azadegan League
14	14 May 1995	1-1	Fakhr Mohammadi (85)	Sharifi (70)	22 Bahman Stadium	Naghsh-Jahan Cup
15	7 March 1995	1-2			22 Bahman Stadium	Hazfi Cup
16	1996	0-0	-	-	22 Bahman Stadium	Azadegan League
17	21 April 1997	2-1	Fayazi, Kaabianpour	Soltani(penalty)	22 Bahman Stadium	Azadegan League
18	1 August 1997	2-2	Stepanyan(44), Oghabi(68)	Khatibi(18), Sahebi(35)	22 Bahman Stadium	Azadegan League
19	1998	0-0			22 Bahman Stadium	Azadegan League
20	18 September 1998	1-0	Mousavi(81)	-	22 Bahman Stadium	Azadegan League
21	30 January 1999	3-0	Stepanyan(21), Dehghani(34), Momenzadeh(90)	-	22 Bahman Stadium	Azadegan League
22	20 August 1999	3-0	Basirat(14,84 pen), Dehghani(32)		22 Bahman Stadium	Azadegan League
23	20 January 2000	0-0			22 Bahman Stadium	Azadegan League
24	18 August 2000	2-1	Loveinian(31), Veysi(40)	Ostovari(21)	22 Bahman Stadium	Azadegan League
25	21 January 2001	0-4	-	Petrossian(21), Sahebi(73,92), Ostovari(93)	22 Bahman Stadium	Azadegan League
26	1 February 2002	2-0	Bezik (38), Stepanyan (45)		Fooladshahar	IPL 1st
27	19 May 2002	2-0	Sartipi (41), Karimi (90)		Naghsh-e-Jahan	IPL 1st
28	27 December 2002	1-0	Karimi (2)		Fooladshahar	IPL 2nd
29	11 May 2003	4-0	Bezik (17,72), Karimi (42), M. Navidkia (50)	-	Naghsh-e-Jahan	IPL 2nd
30	30 June 2003	1(3)-1(4)	Seyed-Salehi (90)	Shafiei (42)	Naghsh-e-Jahan	Hazfi Cup
31	13 September 2003	1-3	Bayat (31)	Omidian (3), Rajabzadeh (51), Vaziri (70)	Fooladshahar	IPL 3rd
32	6 January 2004	2-1	M. Navidkia (45), Bezik (83)	Rajabzadeh (25)	Naghsh-e-Jahan	IPL 3rd
33	27 June 2004	1(5)-1(3)	Khatibi	Ezukam	Naghsh-e-Jahan	Hazfi Cup
34	19 November 2004	0-1	-	Aghily (72)(OG)	Naghsh-e-Jahan	IPL 4th
35	10 April 2005	1-1	Khatibi (6)	Fatemi (53)	Fooladshahar	IPL 4th
36	22 September 2005	0-2		Farhadi (16), Sajedi (90+4)	Fooladshahar	IPL 5th
37	19 January 2006	2-0	Khatibi (53), R. Navidkia (90+4)	-	Naghsh-e-Jahan	IPL 5th
38	17 October 2006	2-0	Bengar (20), Aghily (60)		Fooladshahar	IPL 6th
39	28 February 2007	1-2	Nouri (42)	Rajabzadeh (12), Amraei (75)	Fooladshahar	IPL 6th
40	16 December 2007	0-1		Bengar (16)(OG)	Fooladshahar	IPL 7th
41	5 March 2008	2-2	Mohammed (76), Hajsafi(86)	Khalatbari (3), Mosalman(61)	Fooladshahar	IPL 7th
42	18 September 2008	1-2	Hajsafi (33)	Mosalman (11), Castro (71)	Fooladshahar	IPL 8th
43	31 January 2009	1-2	Armando Sá (35)	Castro (5,37)	Fooladshahar	IPL 8th
44	6 November 2009	0-0			Fooladshahar	IPL 9th
45	17 February 2010	0-1		Hosseini (70)	Fooladshahar	IPL 9th
46	18 August 2010	0-1		Khalatbari (27)	Fooladshahar	IPL 10th
47	13 February 2011	2-0	Aghily(36), Janjuš(55)		Fooladshahar	IPL 10th
48	9 December 2011	1-1	Januário (53)	Ghazi (39)	Fooladshahar	IPL 11th
49	6 May 2012	0-0			Fooladshahar	IPL 11th
50	6 August 2012	4-0	Ta'mini(17), Đalović(48), M. Navidkia(51), Jamshidian(89)		Fooladshahar	IPL 12th
51	13 January 2013	4-3	Sukaj(6, 14), Ebrahimi(32), M. Navidkia(77)	Rajabzadeh(28)(56), Pahlavan(76)	Fooladshahar	IPL 12th
52	27 September 2013	1-0	Ebrahimi (24)		Fooladshahar	IPL 13th
53	7 February 2014	1-0	Karimi (64)		Fooladshahar	IPL 13th
54	29 August 2014	1-1	Sharifi (56)	Mosalman (60)	Fooladshahar	IPL 14th
55	20 February 2015	1-1	Khalatbari (24)	Imani (37)	Fooladshahar	IPL 14th
56	7 August 2015	1-0	Karimi (73)		Fooladshahar	IPL 15th
57	24 November 2015	2(1)-2(4)	Ghafouri (52,113)	Tabrizi (2) Hosseini (110)	Fooladshahar	Hazfi Cup
58	2 January 2016	1-1	Khalatbari (41)	Pahlavan (14)	Fooladshahar	IPL 15th
59	16 October 2016	0-2		Tabrizi (13)(68)	Fooladshahar	IPL 16th
60	5 March 2017	2-1	Djeparov (9), Hassanzadeh (26, P)	Bengtson (87, P)	Naghsh-e Jahan	IPL 16th
61	17 August 2017	2-0	Ansari (72), Alimohammadi (90+4)		Fooladshahar	IPL 17th
62	12 January 2018	1-2	Ansari (93, P)	Fakhreddini (11) Tabrizi (88)	Naghsh-e Jahan	IPL 17th
63	17 August 2018	2-1	Mohammadi (25) Pourghaz (27)	Hosseini (71)	Fooladshahar	IPL 18th
64	26 March 2019	1-1	Shahbazzadeh (34)	Motahari (85)	Naghsh-e Jahan	IPL 18th
65	4 October 2019	2-0	Gvelesiani (51) Kiros (64)		Naghsh-e Jahan	IPL 19th
66	27 February 2020	1-1	Torkaman (4)	Bjedov (90, P)	Fooladshahar	IPL 19th
67	5 February 2021	3-1	Mohebi (2) Esmaeilifar (78) Salmani (90+4)	Shenani (80)	Fooladshahar	IPL 20th
68	25 July 2021	2-0	Noorafkan (45) Mirzaei (90+6)		Naghsh-e Jahan	IPL 20th
69	5 November 2021	0-1		Danaei (57)	Fooladshahar	IPL 21st
70	23 February 2022	0-0	-	-	Naghsh-e Jahan	IPL 21st
71	5 September 2022	1-1	Moghanlou (23)	Ghasemi (36, P)	Fooladshahar	IPL 22nd
72	14 February 2023	2-1	Moghanlou (50) Ahmadzadeh (54)	Eslami (10)	Naghsh-e Jahan	IPL 22nd
73	16 August 2023	2-0	Asadi (52, P) Moghanlou (65)	-	Fooladshahar	IPL 23rd
74	17 April 2024	1-0	Moghanlou (69, P)	-	Naghsh-e Jahan	IPL 23rd
75	22 September 2024	1-1	Yousefi (31)	Kamyabinia (83)	Fooladshahar	IPL 24rd
76	21 February 2025	4-1	Kamara (15) Aghaeipour (70) Asadi (77) Limouchi (89)	Khaghani (48)	Naghsh-e Jahan	IPL 24rd

== Summary of results ==
=== Total matches ===
Teams	Matches	Wins	Draws	Loses	Goals For	Goals Against	Goal Difference
Sepahan	76	30	27	19	91	66	+25
Zob Ahan	76	19	27	30	66	91	-25

== Trophies ==
Team	Domestic				International	Grand Total
Team	Iranian Leagues	Hazfi Cup	Super Cup	Domestic Total	Champions League	Grand Total
Sepahan	5	5	1	11	0	11
Zob Ahan	0	4	1	5	0	5

== Top goal scorers ==
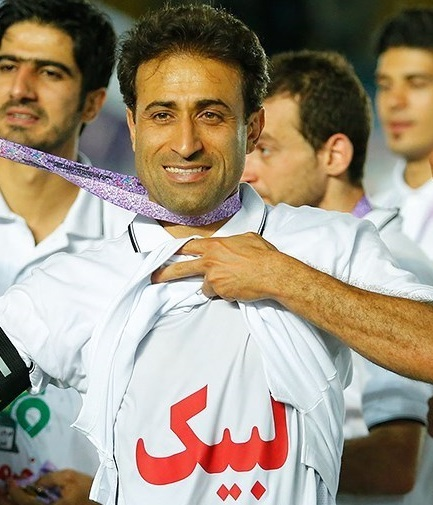
Mehdi Rajabzadeh, top scorer of rivalry

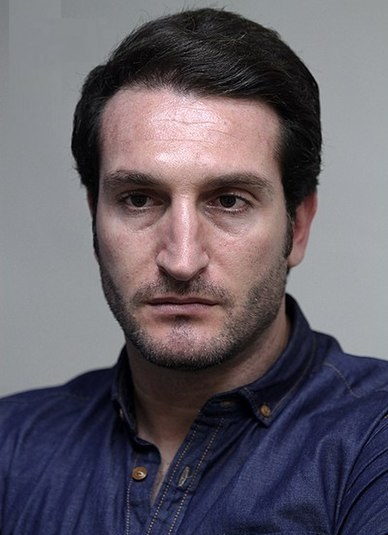
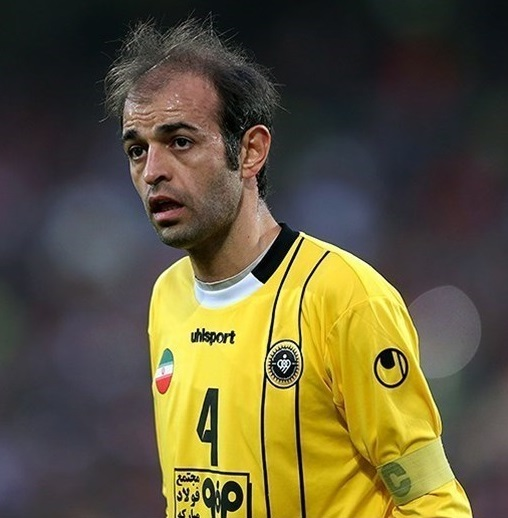
Edmond Bezik and Moharram Navidkia who are Sepahan's highest scorers of rivalries.

Position	Player	Club	Goals
1	(Iran) Mehdi Rajabzadeh	Zob Ahan	5
2	(Iran) Edmond Bezik	Sepahan	4
2	(Iran) Rasoul Khatibi ^{1}	Sepahan / Zob Ahan	4
2	(Iran) Moharram Navidkia	Sepahan	4
2	(Iran) Mohammad Reza Khalatbari ^{2}	Zob Ahan / Sepahan	4
2	(Iran) Morteza Tabrizi	Zob Ahan	4
2	(Iran) Shahriyar Moghanlou	Sepahan	4
8	(Iran) Abbas Simakani	Zob Ahan	3
8	(Iran) Reza Sahebi	Zob Ahan	3
8	(Armenia) Levon Stepanyan	Sepahan	3
8	(Iran) Mahmoud Karimi	Sepahan	3
8	(Brazil) Igor Castro	Zob Ahan	3
8	(Iran) Mohsen Mosalman	Zob Ahan	3

^{1} Khatibi scored 3 goals as the Sepahan player and 1 goal as the Zob Ahan player.
^{2} Khalatbari scored 2 goals as the Zob Ahan player and 2 goals as the Sepahan player.

== Notable Derby Players ==
Name	Club	Goals	Years
(Iran) Mehdi Rajabzadeh	Zob Ahan	5	2010-11 2012-
(Iran) Moharram Navidkia	Sepahan	4	1998-04, 2006–16
(Iran) Edmond Bezik	Sepahan	4	2001-06
(Iran) Morteza Tabrizi	Zob Ahan	4	2013-18
(Iran) Mohammad Reza Khalatbari	Zob Ahan, Sepahan	4	2006–11, 2012–13, 2014–16
(Iran) Rasoul Khatibi	Sepahan, Zob Ahan	4	2003-06, 2009
(Iran) Shahriyar Moghanlou	Sepahan	4	2022-24
(Iran) Mohsen Mosalman	Zob Ahan	3	2007-2015
(Iran) Abbas Simakani	Zob Ahan	3	1990-?
(Brazil) Igor Castro	Zob Ahan	3	2008-12
(Armenia) Levon Stepanyan	Sepahan	3	1996-01, 2002–05
(Iran) Mahmoud Karimi	Sepahan	3	1998-09
(Iran) Reza Sahebi	Zob Ahan	3	1997-2003
(Iran) Vouria Ghafouri	Sepahan	2	2014-16
(Iran) Omid Ebrahimi	Sepahan	2	2010-2014
(Iran) Hadi Aghily	Sepahan	2	2004-11, 2013–16
(Iran) Ehsan Hajsafi	Sepahan	2	2006-2015
(Iran) Reza Ostovari	Zob Ahan	2	2000-?
(Iran) Davoud Dehghani	Sepahan	2	1998-?
(Iran) Ehsan Pahlevan	Zob Ahan	2	2013-
(Iran) Sasan Ansari	Sepahan	2	2017-
(Iran) Mohammad Reza Hosseini	Zob Ahan	2	2015-
(Iran) Reza Asadi	Sepahan	2	2024-

== See also ==
- Football in Iran
- Tehran Derby
- El Gilano
- Mashhad Derby
- Persepolis F.C.–Sepahan S.C. rivalry
- Esteghlal F.C.–Sepahan S.C. rivalry
- Persepolis F.C.–Tractor S.C. rivalry
- Esteghlal F.C.–Tractor S.C rivalry
- Major football rivalries
