= Yadollah Akbari =

Iranian footballer (born 1974)

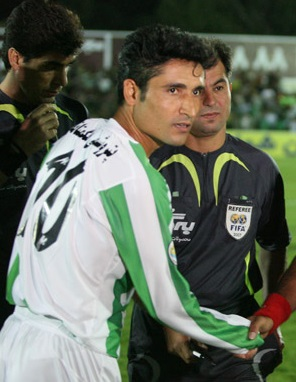

Personal information
- Full name: Yadollah Akbari
- Date of birth: July 1, 1974 (age 52)
- Place of birth: Ardabil, Iran
- Height: 1.76 m (5 ft 9 1/2 in)
- Position: Midfielder

Senior career*
Years	Team	Apps	(Gls)
1999–2001	Saipa	14	(9)
2001–2004	Esteghlal	76	(10)
2004–2005	Esteghlal Ahvaz	24	(6)
2005–2007	Saba Battery	30	(2)
2007–2008	PAS Hamedan	29	(4)
2008–2009	Esteghlal	14	(0)
2009–2010	PAS Hamedan	31	(2)

International career^{‡}
2000–2003	Iran	12	(1)
- * Club domestic league appearances and goals as of 6 June 2010 ‡ National team caps and goals as of 2007

Yadollah Akbari (Persian: یدالله اكبری; born July 1, 1974) is a former Iranian football player who played in the midfielder position.

== Club career ==
Akbari started his career at Tehran side Saipa FC, before moving to Iranian giants Esteghlal FC. In 2004, he was transferred to Ahvazi club Esteghlal Ahvaz. There he enjoyed a good season and in 2005 was transferred to Saba Battery FC. He joined the newly founded club Pas Hamedan in 2007. In 2008 he was transferred back to Esteghlal after having a good season with Pas Hamedan.

Club performance			League		Cup		Continental		Total	
Season	Club	League	Apps	Goals	Apps	Goals	Apps	Goals	Apps	Goals
Iran			League		Hazfi Cup		Asia		Total	
2001–02	Esteghlal	Pro League	20	1				0		
2002–03	Esteghlal	Pro League		5				0		
2003–04	Esteghlal	Pro League		4			-	-		
2004–05	Esteghlal Ahvaz	Pro League	24	6			-	-		
2005–06	Saba	Pro League	7	1				1		
2006–07	Saba	Pro League	23	1			-	-		
2007–08	PAS	Pro League	29	4	2	1	-	-	31	5
2008–09	Esteghlal	Pro League	14	0	1	0	0	0	15	0
2009–10	PAS	Pro League	31	2	1	0	-	-	33	2
Career total				24				1		

- Assist Goals

Season	Team	Assists
05–06	Saba	2
06–07	Saba	2
07–08	Pas	4
08–09	Esteghlal	2
09–10	Pas	5

== International career ==
Yadollah Akbari made his debut for Iran in a match against Kazakhstan in May 2000. He scored his first national goal against China in Civilization Cup in 2001. As of August 2006, he has 12 international appearances for Team Melli.

- Iran's Premier Football League
  - Winner: 1
    - 2008/09 with Esteghlal
