= Farhad Kazemi =

Iranian football manager (born 1959)

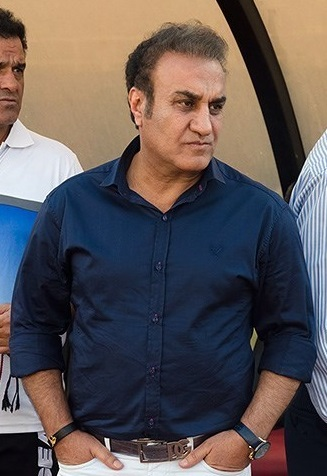
- Kazemi in 2015

Personal information
- Full name: Farhad Kazemi
- Date of birth: 2 July 1959 (age 67)
- Place of birth: Tehran, Iran
- Position: Forward

Youth career
- 1979–1982: Ekbatan

Senior career*
Years	Team	Apps	(Gls)
1982–1985	Ekbatan		
1985–1986	Bootan		
1986–1989	Pas		
1989–1990	Rah Ahan		

Managerial career
- 1995–1996: Bahman
- 1997–1998: Esteghlal Rasht
- 1999–2000: Bahman
- 2000: Pas
- 2001–2002: Aboomoslem Khorasan
- 2002–2005: Sepahan
- 2006: Paykan
- 2006–2007: Saba Battery Tehran
- 2007: Mes Kerman
- 2007–2008: Steel Azin Tehran
- 2008–2009: Sepahan
- 2009: Aboomoslem Khorasan
- 2010: Gostaresh
- 2010–2011: Kaveh Tehran
- 2011–2012: Paykan
- 2012–2013: Zob Ahan
- 2013–2014: Paykan
- 2015: Rah Ahan Tehran
- 2015–2016: Siah Jamegan Mashhad
- 2016–2017: Machine Sazi
- 2017–2018: Esteghlal Jonoub
- 2018–2019: Sorkhpooshan Pakdasht
- 2019–2020: Baadraan Tehran
- 2021: Mes Kerman
- 2025–2026: Paadyab Khalkhal
- * Club domestic league appearances and goals

Farhad Kazemi (Persian: فرهاد کاظمی; born 2 July 1959 in Tehran) is an Iranian football coach and a former footballer who played as a forward.

Farhad Kazemi coached Sepahan F.C. during the 2002–03 season to make the Isfahan based club, the first non-Tehran team to win an Iranian league.

== Early life ==
Farhad Kazemi was born on 2 July 1959 in Tehran. He is a former player, who now works as a coach in Iranian football. He started his athletic career by participating in the sport of wrestling at the age of 13, and bowed out after 3 years. Later, he had an approach towards football, he also tried participating in various sports at high school; sports such as volleyball, wrestling and most importantly football.

== Playing career ==
He started playing for the youth team of Ekbatan, then played for Bootan and Akam, under the supervisions of Madad Noei, Parviz Abootaleb and Hossein Farzami respectively. Then, he played for Kian football club, under the supervision of Akbar Khoshkbari. Later, he moved to Pas to play for them for 3 years under the supervision of Mehdi Monajati. He moved to Rah Ahan in 1989 and played for club until 1990.

== Coaching career ==
Farhad Kazemi has coached many clubs in Iran, most of which have been in the first division.

=== Temporary Suspension from coaching in The IPL ===
A set of regulations was published by The Iran Pro League (IPL) Organisation stating some laws that players and coaches needed to perform by, otherwise they would consequently be suspended from activities in the league.

The so-called “Manshoor Akhalghi” was very much criticised by the people, criticising the charter itself as well as the people who took the biased decisions. It had been a very controversial matter in Iranian media, and many arguments erupted in Iranian football.

The Iran Pro League Organisation accused Farhad Kazemi of being a “Manshoori” and was put on the suspension list, stopping him from having any activities in the Pro League. He joined Aboomoslem Mashhad F.C. in November 2009 but the organisation did not give him the permit to sit on the bench as they mentioned the fact that he is on the suspension list, providing no evidence to prove their accusations.

Subsequently Farhad Kazemi joined and coached Gostaresh Foolad F.C. who played in a lower division, the Azadegan League, he managed to take them to the final of the Hazfi Cup (FA Cup) after beating many teams like Zob Ahan F.C., only to lose to Tehran giants Persepolis F.C. in the final.

After many debates, it was agreed that Farhad Kazemi's name would be taken off the suspension list; otherwise the complaints from Farhad Kazemi would be taken further, and into courts.

== Honours ==
=== Coach ===
- Asian Club Championship
  - Winner: 1
    - 1992–93 with Pas Tehran as Assistant Manager
- Iranian Football League
  - Winner: 1
    - 2002–03 with Sepahan
  - Runner up: 2
    - 1995–96 with Bahman
    - 1996–97 with Bahman
- Azadegan League
  - Winner: 1
    - 2011–12 with Paykan
    - 2013–14 with Paykan
  - Runner up: 1
    - 2005–06 with Paykan
- Hazfi Cup
  - Winner: 1
    - 2003–04 with Sepahan
  - Runner up: 3
    - 1996–97 with Bahman
    - 1999–00 with Bahman
    - 2009–10 with Gostaresh Foolad

== Notable record ==
In 2002-2005 and 2008-2009 as the coach of Sepahan, he faced Esteghlal 11 times in different competitions. Out of those 11 matches, he could get 8 wins, 2 draw and only 1 loss.

Therefore, he became the record-holder in the history of Rivalries between Esteghlal and Sepahan.

Awards and achievements
Preceded by Ali Parvin	Iran Pro League Winning Manager; 2002–03	Succeeded by Majid Jalali
