= 2004–05 Iran Pro League =

4th season of Persian Gulf Pro League

Iran Pro League
- Season: 2004–05
- Champions: Foolad; 1st Pro League title 1st Iranian title
- Relegated: Paykan; Pegah
- Champions League: Foolad; Saba Battery (Hazfi Cup champions)
- Matches: 240
- Goals: 545 (2.27 per match)
- Top goalscorer: Reza Enayati (20 goals)
- Biggest home win: Est. Ahvaz 6–0 Shamoushak (31 December 2004); Persepolis 6–0 Pegah (24 April 2005)
- Biggest away win: Sepahan 1–4 Saipa (14 September 2004); Bargh Shiraz 0–3 Esteghlal (26 November 2004); Esteghlal 0–3 Zob Ahan (11 March 2005); Shamoushak 0–3 Est. Ahvaz (20 June 2005)
- Highest scoring: Saba Battery 4–4 Bargh Shiraz (4 March 2006)
- Longest winning run: Esteghlal (5 matches)
- Longest unbeaten run: Esteghlal (13 matches)
- Longest winless run: Pegah (7 matches)
- Longest losing run: Pegah (5 matches)

The 2004–05 Iran Pro League was the 22nd season of Iran's Football League and fourth as Iran Pro League since its establishment in 2001. PAS Tehran were the defending champions. The season featured 14 teams from the 2003–04 Iran Pro League and two new teams promoted from the 2003–04 Azadegan League. The two teams were the last seasons league champions Saba Battery and runners-up Malavan. The league started on 13 September 2004 and ended on 20 June 2005. Foolad won the Pro League title for the first time in their history (total first Iranian title).

== Teams ==
Team	Location	Stadium	Capacity
Aboomoslem	Mashhad	Samen Stadium	27,000
Bargh Shiraz	Shiraz	Hafezieh Stadium	20,000
Esteghlal	Tehran	Azadi Stadium	100,000
Esteghlal Ahvaz	Ahvaz	Takhti Stadium	30,000
Fajr Sepasi	Shiraz	Hafezieh Stadium	20,000
Foolad	Ahvaz	Takhti Stadium	30,000
Malavan	Anzali	Sirous Ghayeghran Stadium	15,559
PAS	Tehran	Shahid Dastgerdi Stadium	8,250
Paykan	Tehran	Iran Khodro Stadium	10,000
Pegah	Rasht	Shahid Dr. Azodi Stadium	15,000
Persepolis	Tehran	Azadi Stadium	100,000
Saba Battery	Sabashahr	Shahid Derakhshan Stadium	12,000
Saipa	Tehran	Shahid Shiroudi Stadium	25,000
Sepahan	Isfahan	Naghsh-e Jahan Stadium	75,000
Shamoushak	Noshahr	Shohada-ye Nowshahr Stadium	6,000
Zob Ahan	Isfahan	Foolad Shahr Stadium	20,000

== Final classification ==
Pos	Team	Pld	W	D	L	GF	GA	GD	Pts	Qualification or relegation
1	Foolad (C)	30	19	7	4	41	20	+21	64	Qualification for the 2006 AFC Champions League
2	Zob Ahan	30	17	7	6	38	19	+19	58	
3	Esteghlal	30	16	10	4	51	35	+16	58	
4	Persepolis	30	16	7	7	43	27	+16	55	
5	Est. Ahvaz	30	12	8	10	41	34	+7	44	
6	Pas	30	11	9	10	49	40	+9	42	
7	Malavan	30	10	11	9	34	27	+7	41	
8	Aboumoslem	30	9	11	10	33	33	0	38	
9	Saba	30	8	11	11	38	40	−2	35	Qualification for the 2006 AFC Champions League
10	Sepahan	30	7	14	9	30	33	−3	35	
11	Fajr	30	9	8	13	24	32	−8	35	
12	Bargh	30	7	12	11	34	43	−9	33	
13	Saipa	30	7	10	13	24	34	−10	31	
14	Shamoushak	30	8	7	15	26	49	−23	31	
15	Paykan (R)	30	5	9	16	22	34	−12	24	Relegation to the 2005–06 Azadegan League
16	Pegah (R)	30	3	11	16	17	45	−28	20	Relegation to the 2005–06 Azadegan League

Updated to match(es) played on 1 September 2018. Source: IPL Stats, Soccerway
Rules for classification: 1) Points; 2) Goal difference; 3) Goals scored.
(C) Champions; (R) Relegated

== Results table ==
Home \ Away	FOL	ZOB	EST	PRS	ESA	PAS	MLV	ABU	SAB	SEP	FJR	BGH	SAP	SHM	PAY	PEG
Foolad		0–1	1–0	3–1	2–0	2–1	1–1	1–0	1–0	0–0	1–0	4–0	2–1	3–1	1–0	2–1
Zob Ahan	2–0		3–1	3–2	3–1	2–0	2–0	0–1	2–3	1–1	0–0	1–0	1–0	2–0	1–0	1–0
Esteghlal	1–2	0–3		3–2	1–1	2–1	3–1	2–2	3–1	2–2	2–1	3–2	4–3	3–0	2–1	2–0
Persepolis	0–2	1–0	0–0		2–0	2–1	1–2	3–2	1–0	1–2	5–1	1–1	1–0	2–1	2–1	6–0
Est. Ahvaz	3–1	1–2	2–2	1–1		2–1	0–1	3–2	1–0	1–1	3–0	1–1	1–0	6–0	2–1	1–0
PAS Tehran	1–1	2–2	1–2	1–1	1–1		3–2	1–1	2–3	2–3	1–0	5–1	3–0	4–2	0–0	3–1
Malavan	1–2	0–0	0–0	1–2	1–0	0–0		1–1	2–0	0–1	3–0	1–1	5–0	1–1	1–0	3–0
Aboumoslem	0–0	3–2	2–3	1–0	2–2	0–1	0–0		2–3	2–1	0–1	3–2	0–1	1–0	1–0	3–0
Saba Battery	0–0	1–2	1–1	0–0	0–0	4–3	2–0	0–0		2–1	0–1	4–4	1–2	3–0	2–2	0–0
Sepahan	1–1	0–1	2–2	0–0	0–1	0–1	1–1	1–1	1–0		0–0	2–0	1–4	1–1	1–2	1–1
Fajr Sepasi	0–1	0–0	0–0	0–0	1–2	0–1	0–1	4–1	3–2	0–0		1–1	1–1	2–1	2–1	0–1
Bargh Shiraz	1–1	0–0	0–3	1–2	2–0	2–1	1–0	0–0	1–0	1–0	1–2		0–0	3–1	1–1	4–1
Saipa	1–2	1–0	0–0	0–1	3–0	1–3	0–0	0–0	1–2	1–2	1–0	1–1		1–1	0–0	0–0
Shamoushak	2–1	1–0	0–1	0–1	0–3	1–1	1–2	0–2	2–2	2–1	1–0	2–1	1–0		1–0	0–0
Paykan	0–1	0–1	0–1	0–1	2–1	0–2	2–1	1–0	1–1	1–2	1–2	0–0	0–0	2–2		0–0
Pegah	0–2	0–0	1–2	0–1	1–0	2–2	2–2	0–0	1–1	1–1	0–2	2–1	0–1	0–1	2–3	

Source: http://www.iplstats.com/
Legend: Blue = home team win; Yellow = draw; Red = away team win.

== Player statistics ==
=== Top goal scorers ===
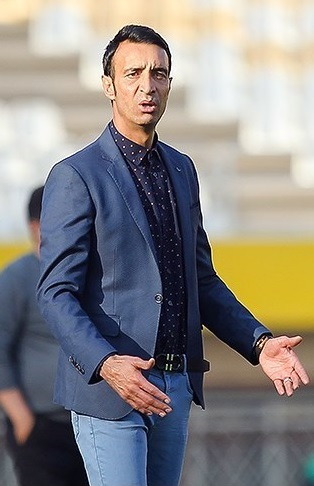
Reza Enayati

20

- (Iran) Reza Enayati (Esteghlal)

14

- (Iran) Fereydoon Fazli (Aboomoslem)
- (Iran) Rasoul Khatibi (Sepahan)

12

- (Iran) Eman Mobali (Foolad)

11

- (Iran) Ali Daei (Saba Battery)

9

- (Iran) Arash Borhani (Pas Tehran)
- (Iran) Javad Kazemian (Persepolis)
- (Iran) Javad Nekounam (PAS Tehran)
- (Iran) Iman Razaghirad (Pas Tehran)

8

- (Iran) Sohrab Entezari (Persepolis)
- (Iran) Mehrdad Oladi (Persepolis)
- (Iran) Mehdi Rajabzadeh (Zob Ahan)
- (Iran) Hojat Zadmahmoud (Est. Ahvaz)

== Participating in international competitions ==
2005 AFC Champions League

- PAS
- Sepahan
