= Habib Sharifi =

Iranian footballer

Personal information
- Full name: Habib Sharifi
- Place of birth: Khuzestan Province, Iran
- Position: Forward

Senior career*
Years	Team	Apps	(Gls)
1976–1977	Pas		(8)

International career
1977	Iran	1	(1)
- * Club domestic league appearances and goals

Habib Sharifi (Persian: حبیب شریفی) was an Iranian association footballer. He played and scored for Iran national football team once.
