= Afshin Hajipour =

Iranian footballer

Personal information
- Full name: Afshin Hajipour
- Date of birth: 17 December 1975
- Place of birth: Lali, Iran
- Position: Midfielder

Youth career
- 1993–1994: Foolad

Senior career*
Years	Team	Apps	(Gls)
1994–1999	Foolad		
1999–2000	Esteghlal		(1)
2000–2003	Sepahan		
2003–2005	Foolad		

International career
1998	Iran	2	(0)
- * Club domestic league appearances and goals

Afshin Hajipour (17 December 1975) is a retired Iranian football midfielder who played for Foolad Ahwaz, Esteghlal Tehran and Sepahan Isfahan.
