= Rasoul Khorvash =

Iranian footballer and manager

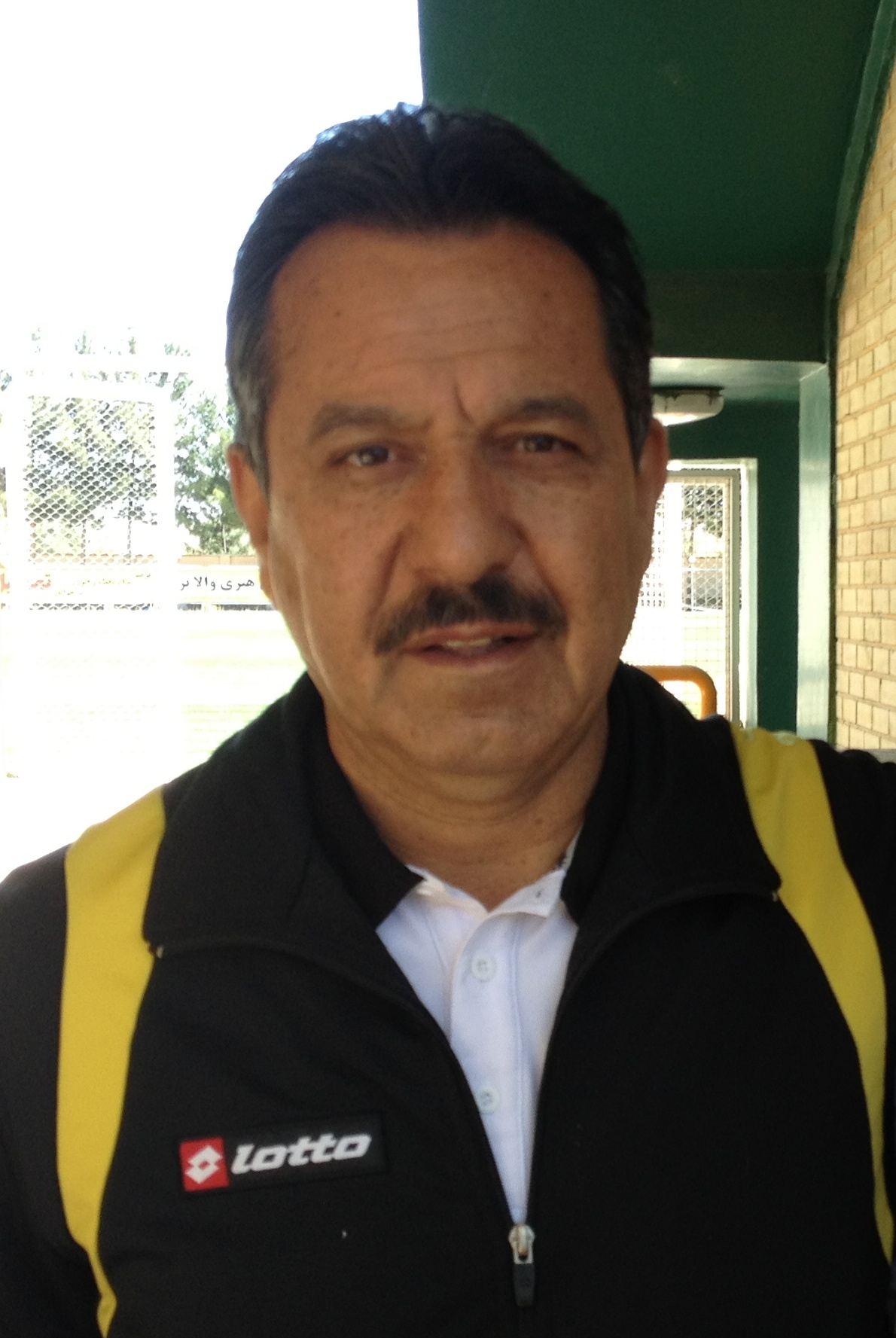
- Khorvash in 2013

Personal information
- Date of birth: 30 January 1953 (age 73)
- Place of birth: Isfahan, Iran
- Position: Midfielder

Team information
- Current team: Sepahan (team manager)

Youth career
- 1961–1969: Sepahan

Senior career*
Years	Team	Apps	(Gls)
1969–1984	Sepahan		
- * Club domestic league appearances and goals

Rasoul Khrovash (Persian: رسول خوروش; born 30 January 1953 in Isfahan) is a retired Iranian football midfielder. He is currently the team manager at Sepahan. He is graduated from the University of Texas in sports and before this, he was graduated from Isfahan University in geographical. He is the brother of Mostafa Khorvash and cousin of Shokrallah Khorvash, the founder of Sepahan.

== Playing career ==
Khorvash is one of the former players of Sepahan which he began his football career at the age of 8 in Sepahan academy and was promoted to the first team when he was 16. He was retired in 1984 when playing for Sepahan. His usual post was left midfielder.

== After retirement ==
He was appointed as team manager of Sepahan on 9 November 2011.
