= Mehdi Fonounizadeh =

Iranian footballer

Mehdi Fononi Zadegan
Personal information
- Full name: Mehdi Fononi Zadegan
- Date of birth: 11 November 1965 (age 60)
- Place of birth: Tehran, Iran
- Height: 1.91 m (6 ft 3 in)
- Position: Midfielder

Youth career
- Rah Ahan

Senior career*
Years	Team	Apps	(Gls)
1985–1988	Niroo Zamini		
1988–1990	Daraei		
1990–1992	Esteghlal		
1992–1994	Bank Tejarat		
1994–1995	Fajr Sepah Tehran		
1995–1996	Saipa		
1996–1998	Pas		
1998–1999	Bahman		

International career
1986–1994	Iran	41	(2)
- * Club domestic league appearances and goals

Mehdi Fononi Zadegan (Persian: مهدی فنونی زاده) (born 11 November 1965 in Tehran, Iran) is a retired Iranian football player.

== Honours ==
- Gold Medal winner at 1990 Asian Games, as member of the Iran national football team.
- Nominated for 1993 Asian Footballer of the Year winning 13 votes losing to Fahad Al-Bishi who received 17 and Kazuyoshi Miura who won the award with 30 votes.
- Winner of ECO Cup 1993, as member of the Iran national football team.
- 1993 Asian Footballer of the Year 3rd place
