= Morteza Hashemizadeh =

Iranian footballer

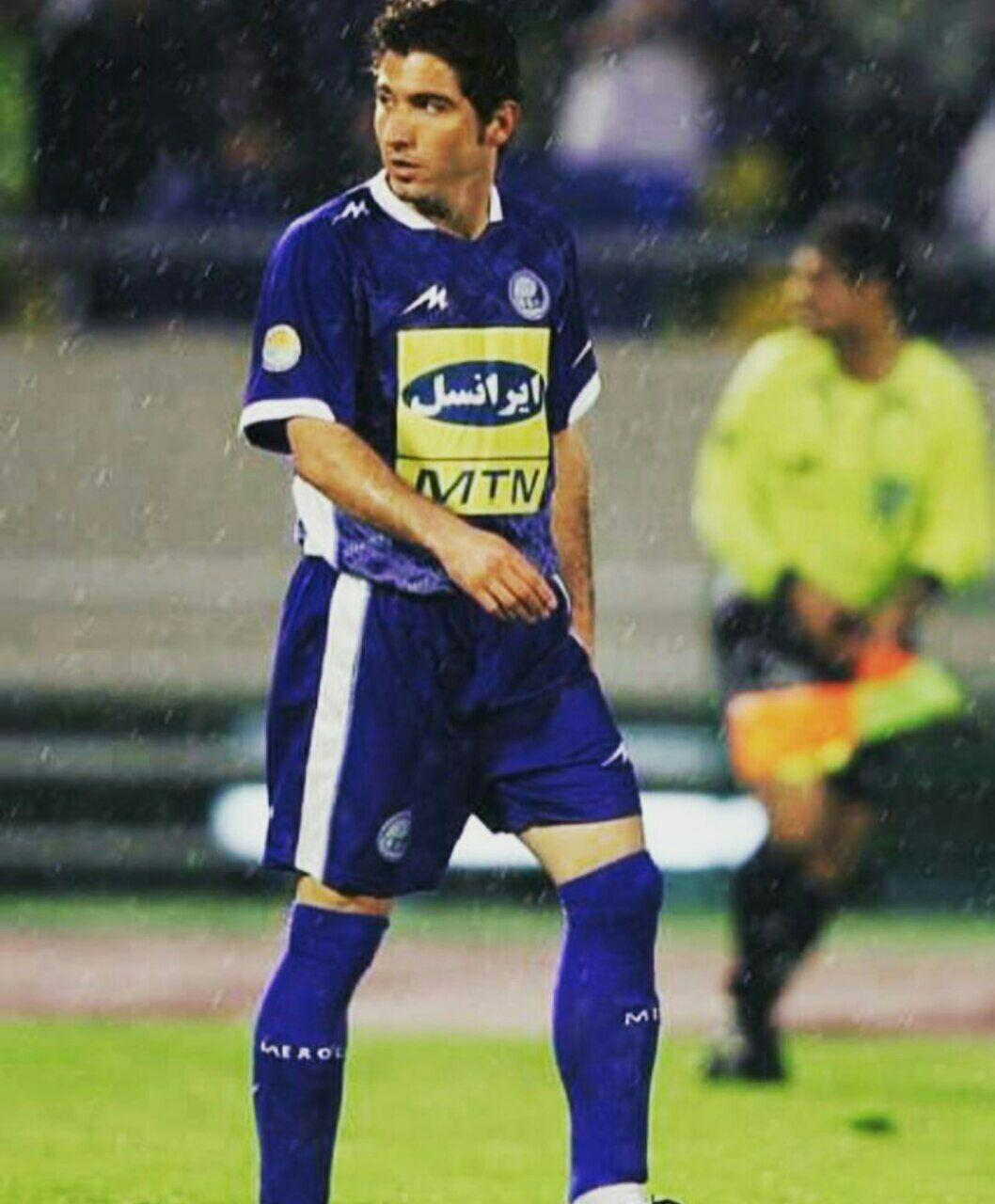

Personal information
- Full name: Seyyed Morteza Hashemizadeh
- Date of birth: 11 November 1979 (age 47)
- Place of birth: Iran
- Height: 1.81 m (5 ft 11 in)
- Position: Right winger

Senior career*
| Years | Team | Apps | (Gls) |
| 2002–2005 | Sepahan | | (0) |
| 2005–2007 | Esteghlal | 13 | (1) |
| 2007–2008 | Steel Azin | | |
| 2009–2010 | Payam Mashhad | | (0) |
| 2010–2012 | Saba Qom | 44 | (4) |
| 2012–2013 | Iranjavan | 13 | (0) |
| 2013 | Shahrdari Tabriz | 13 | (0) |
| 2013–2014 | Aluminium Hormozgan | 6 | (0) |
| 2014 | Shahrdari Bandar Abbas | 10 | (1) |
| 2014–2015 | Siah Jamegan | 4 | (0) |
| 2015–2016 | Baadraan | | |
- * Club domestic league appearances and goals

Seyyed Morteza Hashemizadeh (Persian: سید مرتضی هاشمی زاده) is an Iranian retired football player. He usually played as a midfielder or forward.
