= Shohada-ye Nowshahr Stadium =

Multi-purpose stadium in Noshahr, Iran

Coordinates: 36°39′02″N 51°30′37″E

Shohada-ye Nowshahr
- Interactive map of Shohada-ye Nowshahr
- Full name: Shohada-ye Nowshahr Stadium
- Location: Nowshahr, Iran
- Owner: Shemushack Noshahr F.C.
- Operator: Shemushack Noshahr F.C.
- Capacity: 6,000 (Football)
- Surface: Grass

Construction
- Built: 1994
- Opened: 1994

Tenant
- Shamushack 1994-

The Shohada-ye Nowshahr Stadium is a multi-purpose stadium in Nowshahr, Iran. It is currently used mostly for football matches and is the home stadium of Shemushack Noshahr F.C. in the Azadegan League. The stadium holds 6,000 people. There was an incident in this stadium in the match against Persepolis in the Hazfi Cup in 2003 in which some of the seats fell down. Two people died, and Persepolis withdrew from the competition.
