= Karo Haghverdian =

Iranian Armenian footballer

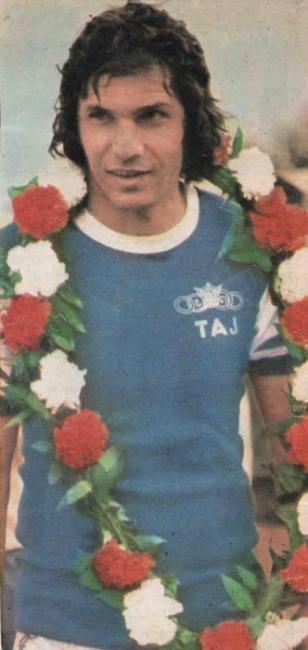

Personal information
- Full name: Karo Haghverdian
- Date of birth: 11 January 1945 (age 81)
- Place of birth: Tehran, Iran
- Height: 1.78 m (5 ft 10 in)
- Position: Midfielder

Youth career
- 1958–1963: Gohar F.C.

Senior career*
Years	Team	Apps	(Gls)
1963–1966	Ararat Tehran		
1967	Shoa F.C.		
1968–1976	Taj SC		

International career^{‡}
1968–1975	Iran	23	(2)
- * Club domestic league appearances and goals as of 22 February 2012 ‡ National team caps and goals as of 22 February 2012

Karo Haghverdian (Armenian: Կարո Հախվերդյան; Persian: کارو حق‌وردیان; born January 11, 1945) is a retired Iranian Armenian football player.

== Early life ==
Haghverdian started playing football at the age of 13 when he joined amateur side Gohar F.C. Under the guidance of coach Areshavir Yeritsian, Haghverdian developed into a star player for the team. However, his parents—worried about how his passion for football was affecting his schooling—cautioned Haghverdian to stop playing football and to concentrate on his studies instead.

Going against his parents' wishes, Haghverdian continued to play. His performances on the pitch helped his team win several local championships.

== Career ==
In 1963, Haghverdian was spotted by Ararat Tehran FC coach Garnik Mehrabian. Noticing his talent, Mehrabian immediately signed Haghverdian to a contract for the remainder of the season. Haghverdian continued to play for the team for three seasons, until he was spotted by Taj S.C. manager Zdravko Rajkov. Haghverdian spent 6 seasons with Taj S.C., in which he participated in a record 17 Tehran Derbies against rival Persepolis F.C.

== International ==
Haghverdian received 23 caps by the Iran national football team, scoring his only goal against Pakistan in the 1970 RCD Cup.

== External sources ==
- Karo Haghverdian at National-Football-Teams.com
