= 2003–04 Hazfi Cup =

Tournament details
- Country: Iran

Final positions
- Champions: Sepahan
- Runners-up: Esteghlal

The 2003–04 Hazfi Cup was the 17th season of the Iranian football knockout competition. This tournament has been organised annually by the Football Federation Islamic Republic of Iran. Founded in 1975, the competition was not held during the 1980s.

== Bracket ==
- Teams from same city meet only once
- Other teams withdrew after the first leg

Round of 16
Zob Ahan	8	–	8
Pegah	1	–	1
Karoun Shushtar	3	0	3
Oghab Gonbad	0	1	1
Foolad	2	0	2
Sepahan	0	4	4
Est.Ahvaz	1	3	4
Persepolis	0	2	2
Esteghlal	3	–	3
Pasargad	2	–	2
Aboumoslem	1	1	2 (2)
Paykan	1	1	2 (4)
Homa	1	–	1 (4)
Saipa	1	–	1 (5)
PAS Tehran	2	–	2
Bargh Shiraz	1	–	1

Quarter-finals
Zob Ahan	3	0	3
Karoun Shushtar	0	1	1
Sepahan	3	0	3
Est.Ahvaz	0	2	2
Esteghlal	1	–	1
Paykan	0	–	0
Saipa	1	–	1
PAS Tehran	0	–	0

Semi-finals
Zob Ahan	1	–	1 (3)
Sepahan	1	–	1 (5)
Esteghlal	2	–	2
Saipa	1	–	1

Final
Sepahan	3	2	5
Esteghlal	2	0	2

== Semi-final ==
Team 1	Agg.	Team 2	1st leg	2nd leg
Sepahan	1- 1 (5–3 (p))	Zob Ahan	1–1	–

Team 1	Agg.	Team 2	1st leg	2nd leg
Esteghlal	2–1	Saipa Tehran	2–1	–

Match 2

June 27, 2004

Esteghlal	2–1	Saipa Tehran
Akbari 73'; Nikbakht 76'		Mansourian 47' (o.g.)

Tehran, Azadi Stadium

== Final ==
Team 1	Agg.	Team 2	1st leg	2nd leg
Sepahan	5–2	Esteghlal	3–2	2–0

Leg 1

July 08, 2004

Sepahan	3–2	Esteghlal
Stepanyan 9'; Khormagah 57' (o.g.); Hashemizadeh 87'		Akbari 27'; Enayati 80'

Esfahan, Naghsh Jahan Stadium
Attendance: 30,000

Leg 2

July 15, 2004

Esteghlal	0–2	Sepahan
		Seyed-Salehi 25', 68'

Tehran, Azadi Stadium
Attendance: 85,000
Referee: Masoud Moradi
