= 2003–04 Iran Pro League =

3rd season of Persian Gulf Pro League

Iran Pro League
- Season: 2003–04
- Champions: PAS
- Relegated: Saipa; Shamoushak
- 2005 AFC Champions League: PAS; Sepahan
- Matches: 182
- Goals: 459 (2.52 per match)
- Top goalscorer: Ali Daei (16 goals)
- Biggest home win: Persepolis 8–2 Pegah
- Biggest away win: Bargh Shiraz 1–5 Sepahan
- Highest scoring: Persepolis 8–2 Pegah
- Longest winning run: Zob Ahan (5 matches)
- Longest unbeaten run: PAS (15 matches)
- Longest winless run: Shamoushak (10 matches)
- Longest losing run: Shamoushak (5 matches)

The following is the standings of the Persian Gulf Cup's 2003–04 football season. This was the third season since the establishment of the Iran Pro League (Persian Gulf Cup). Pas Tehran F.C. were defending champions.

== Teams ==
Team	Location	Stadium	Capacity
Aboomoslem	Mashhad	Takhti Stadium	15,000
Bargh Shiraz	Shiraz	Hafezieh Stadium	20,000
Esteghlal	Tehran	Azadi Stadium	100,000
Esteghlal Ahvaz	Ahvaz	Takhti Stadium	30,000
Fajr Sepasi	Shiraz	Hafezieh Stadium	20,000
Foolad	Ahvaz	Takhti Stadium	30,000
PAS	Tehran	Shahid Dastgerdi Stadium	8,250
Paykan	Tehran	Iran Khodro Stadium	10,000
Pegah	Rasht	Shahid Dr. Azodi Stadium	15,000
Persepolis	Tehran	Azadi Stadium	100,000
Saipa	Tehran	Shahid Shiroudi Stadium	30,000
Sepahan	Isfahan	Naghsh-e Jahan Stadium	75,000
Shamoushak	Noshahr	Shohada-ye Nowshahr Stadium	6,000
Zob Ahan	Isfahan	Foolad Shahr Stadium	20,000

== Final classification ==
Pos	Team	Pld	W	D	L	GF	GA	GD	Pts	Qualification or relegation
1	Pas (C)	26	15	8	3	48	29	+19	53	Qualification for the 2005 AFC Champions League
2	Esteghlal	26	14	9	3	46	31	+15	51	
3	Foolad	26	13	8	5	37	22	+15	47	
4	Zob Ahan	26	11	7	8	32	25	+7	40	
5	Persepolis	26	10	9	7	42	28	+14	39	
6	Sepahan	26	11	6	9	47	36	+11	39	Qualification for the 2005 AFC Champions League
7	Paykan	26	8	8	10	24	26	−2	32	
8	Est. Ahvaz	26	7	10	9	35	43	−8	31	
9	Pegah	26	8	6	12	27	42	−15	30	
10	Aboumoslem	26	6	11	9	25	26	−1	29	
11	Fajr	26	6	11	9	27	35	−8	29	
12	Bargh	26	5	9	12	27	47	−20	24	
13	Saipa (O)	26	3	12	11	23	36	−13	21	Relegation to the play-offs
14	Shamoushak (O)	26	4	8	14	19	33	−14	20	Relegation to the play-offs

Updated to match(es) played on 01 SEP 2018. Source: IPL Stats, Soccerway
Rules for classification: 1) Points; 2) Goal difference; 3) Goals scored.
(C) Champions; (O) Play-off winners

== Results table ==
Home \ Away	PAS	EST	FOL	ZOB	PRS	SEP	PAY	ESA	PEG	ABU	FJR	BGH	SAP	SHM
PAS Tehran		2–2	2–1	0–0	4–3	2–1	2–0	5–0	2–0	1–1	3–2	1–1	1–0	2–1
Esteghlal	0–1		3–1	1–0	1–1	2–1	2–2	2–1	3–2	3–3	3–2	2–2	3–2	2–1
Foolad	2–1	1–1		0–0	1–0	1–0	2–0	2–2	4–1	2–0	3–0	3–0	1–0	2–0
Zob Ahan	1–1	2–1	0–1		1–0	3–1	1–0	1–1	2–0	1–1	2–1	3–3	1–1	2–1
Persepolis	1–2	1–2	1–0	2–1		3–3	0–0	0–0	8–2	0–0	5–2	4–0	2–0	2–1
Sepahan	3–4	0–0	2–1	2–1	1–2		2–1	4–2	3–0	3–0	3–1	2–0	1–1	3–0
Paykan	3–1	1–1	0–0	0–3	2–1	1–1		1–2	1–0	1–0	0–0	3–1	1–1	2–0
Est. Ahvaz	2–3	2–1	2–2	0–1	1–1	2–0	0–0		1–1	2–1	3–0	2–0	1–1	1–2
Pegah	1–0	0–1	1–1	2–1	0–0	3–1	0–2	3–0		1–0	0–0	3–2	0–0	2–1
Aboumoslem	1–1	0–1	2–2	1–0	0–1	0–0	1–0	4–0	3–0		1–0	1–1	1–2	3–0
Fajr Sepasi	1–1	2–2	1–2	2–0	1–1	2–1	2–1	1–1	2–1	1–0		0–0	1–1	0–0
Bargh Shiraz	1–3	0–2	2–0	1–2	0–0	1–5	2–1	3–4	3–2	0–0	0–2		2–1	2–1
Saipa	1–3	0–3	0–0	1–3	3–2	1–2	0–1	1–1	1–2	1–1	1–1	0–0		0–0
Shamoushak	0–0	1–2	1–2	1–0	0–1	2–2	1–0	3–0	0–0	0–0	0–0	0–0	2–3	

Source: http://www.iplstats.com/
Legend: Blue = home team win; Yellow = draw; Red = away team win.

== Promotion/relegation playoff ==
Pos	Team	Pld	W	D	L	GF	GA	GD	Pts
1	Saipa	3	3	0	0	5	0	+5	9
2	Shamoushak	3	2	0	1	4	2	+2	6
3	Sanat Naft	3	0	1	2	3	6	−3	1
4	Shahid Ghandi	3	0	1	2	3	7	−4	1

Updated to match(es) played on unknown. Source:

== Player statistics ==
=== Top goal scorers ===
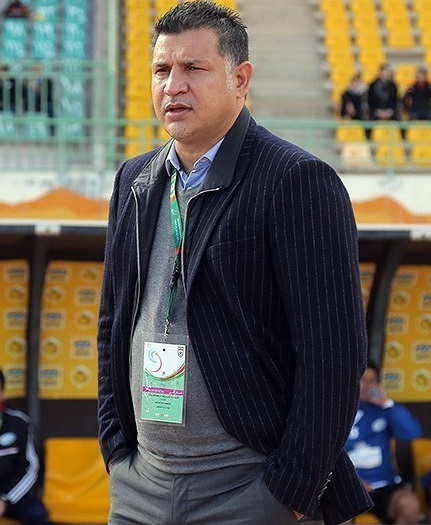
Ali Daei

16

- (Iran) Ali Daei (Persepolis)

12

- (Iran) Arash Borhani (PAS Tehran)

11

- (Iran) Reza Enayati (Esteghlal)

10

- (Iran) Javad Nekounam (PAS Tehran)

9

- (Iran) Khodadad Azizi (PAS Tehran)
- (Iran) Amir Khalifeasl (Est. Ahvaz)
- (Iran) Mehdi Rajabzadeh (Zob Ahan)

8

- (Brazil) Adriano Alvez (Est. Ahvaz)
- (Iran) Rasoul Khatibi (Sepahan)
- (Iran) Iman Mobali (Foolad)
- (Iran) Pejman Noori (Pegah Gilan)
- (Iran) Iman Razaghirad (Aboomoslem)
- (Iran) Bahman Tahmasebi (Paykan)

== Participating in international competitions ==
2004 AFC Champions League

- Zob Ahan
- Sepahan
