= 1976–77 Takht Jamshid Cup =

Takht Jamshid Cup
- Season: 1976–77
- Champions: PAS Tehran
- Relegated: Ararat; Aboomoslem
- Matches: 240
- Goals: 366 (1.53 per match)
- Top goalscorer: Gholam Hossein Mazloumi (19)

The 1976–77 season was the fourth season of the Takht Jamshid Cup of Iranian football. The competition was won by PAS Football Club of Tehran.

== Results ==
Pos	Team	Pld	W	D	L	GF	GA	GD	Pts	Relegation
1	PAS Tehran (C)	30	13	13	4	34	14	+20	39	
2	Persepolis	30	10	17	3	25	18	+7	37	
3	Shahbaz	30	13	10	7	36	24	+12	36	
4	Taj	30	11	13	6	28	19	+9	35	
5	Daraei	30	7	21	2	25	16	+9	35	
6	Niroo Ahvaz	30	11	12	7	20	26	−6	34	
7	Malavan	30	10	13	7	25	21	+4	33	
8	Homa F.C.	30	11	10	9	26	21	+5	32	
9	Machine Sazi	30	8	16	6	23	23	0	32	
10	Bank Melli	30	8	10	12	17	28	−11	26	
11	Bargh Shiraz	30	5	15	10	13	19	−6	25	
12	Ararat F.C. (R)	30	6	13	11	23	32	−9	25	Relegated to 2nd Division
13	Sanat Naft	30	4	16	10	21	26	−5	24	
14	Sepahan	30	5	14	11	20	30	−10	24	
15	Zob Ahan	30	4	15	11	21	35	−14	23	
16	Aboomoslem (R)	30	4	12	14	9	26	−17	20	Relegated to 2nd Division

(C) Champions; (R) Relegated

== Top goalscorers ==
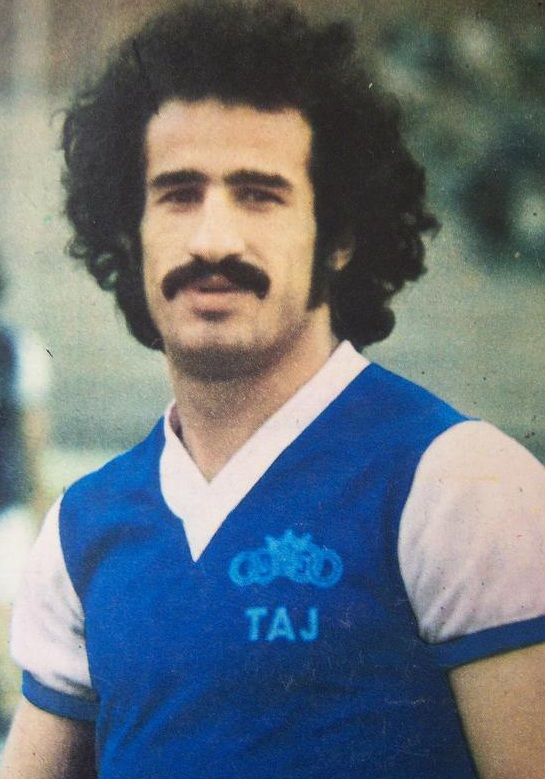
Gholam Hossein Mazloumi

Pos	Scorer	Goals	Team
1st	(Iran) Gholam Hossein Mazloumi	19	Shahbaz
2nd	(Iran) Ghafour Jahani	9	Malavan
3rd	(Iran) Hossein Faraki	7	PAS
	(Iran) Hossein Hafezi	7	Niru
	(Iran) Hadi Naraghi	7	Taj
	(Iran) Nasser Nouraei	7	Homa
	(Iran) Habib Sharifi	7	PAS
