= Hadi Naraghi =

Iranian footballer

Personal information
- Full name: Hadi Naraghi
- Place of birth: Tehran, Iran

Senior career*
Years	Team	Apps	(Gls)
1973–1979	Taj SC		

International career
- Iran U20
- * Club domestic league appearances and goals

Hadi Naraghi is an Iranian football player. He played for Taj (now known as Esteghlal) and he scored a goal in the derby against Persepolis FC.

== Goal in Derby ==
In the Tehran derby on 1355-07-02 between Taj (now known as Esteghlal) and Persepolis FC, Hadi Naraghi scored a goal on the 26th minute to give Taj the lead. Shortly afterwards on the 40th minute, Ali Parvin scored an equaliser. The game finished 1–1.

== 1974 Iran International Tournament ==
Hadi Naraghi was in the Iran B squad for the 1974 Iran International Tournament. The 6 teams that took part were: Iran A, USSR U23, FK Teplice, Iran B, Zagłębie Sosnowiec and Tunisia national football team. Iran B lost in the semi-finals to FK Teplice

== 1976–77 Takht Jamshid Cup ==
Hadi Naraghi also took part in the 1976–77 Takht Jamshid Cup. He did well and scored 7 goals. He also helped his team, Taj come 4th that year.
