= Masoud Mojdehi =

Iranian footballer

Personal information
- Full name: Masoud Mojdehi
- Date of birth: May 4, 1951 (age 75)
- Place of birth: Iran
- Position: Forward

Senior career*
Years	Team	Apps	(Gls)
1973–1977	Taj SC		

International career
1973–1975	Iran	5	(0)
- * Club domestic league appearances and goals

Masoud Mojdehi is an Iranian football forward who played for Iran national football team. He also played for Taj SC.

== Honours ==
=== Club ===
- Takht Jamshid Cup

Winner: 1

1974–75 with Taj SC

Runner up: 1

1973–74 with Taj SC

- Hazfi Cup

Winner: 1

1976–77 with Taj SC
