= 2002–03 Iran Pro League =

2nd season of Persian Gulf Pro League

Iran Pro League
- Season: 2002–03
- Champions: Sepahan
- Relegated: Sanat Naft; Malavan
- 2004 AFC Champions League: Zob Ahan; Sepahan
- Matches: 182
- Goals: 402 (2.21 per match)
- Top goalscorer: Edmund Bezik (13 Goals)
- Biggest home win: Sepahan 4–0 Zob Ahan; Bargh Shiraz 4–0 Zob Ahan
- Biggest away win: Malavan 0–4 Fajr Sepasi
- Highest scoring: Esteghlal Ahvaz 2–5 Saipa; Foolad 2–5 Bargh Shiraz
- Longest winning run: Sepahan (8 matches)
- Longest unbeaten run: Persepolis (11 matches)
- Longest winless run: Aboomoslem (13 matches)
- Longest losing run: Aboomoslem (5 matches)

The following is the standings of the Persian Gulf Cup's 2002–03 football season. This was the second season since the establishment of the Iran Pro League (Persian Gulf Cup). Foolad Mobarakeh Sepahan F.C. became the first non-Tehran based team to win the league under the management of Farhad Kazemi.

== Teams ==
Team	Location	Stadium	Capacity
Aboomoslem	Mashhad	Takhti Stadium	15,000
Bargh Shiraz	Shiraz	Hafezieh Stadium	20,000
Esteghlal	Tehran	Azadi Stadium	100,000
Esteghlal Ahvaz	Ahvaz	Takhti Stadium	30,000
Fajr Sepasi	Shiraz	Hafezieh Stadium	20,000
Foolad	Ahvaz	Takhti Stadium	30,000
Malavan	Anzali	Sirous Ghayeghran Stadium	15,559
PAS	Tehran	Shahid Dastgerdi Stadium	8,250
Paykan	Tehran	Iran Khodro Stadium	10,000
Persepolis	Tehran	Azadi Stadium	100,000
Saipa	Tehran	Shahid Shiroudi Stadium	25,000
Sanat Naft	Abadan	Takhti Stadium	20,000
Sepahan	Isfahan	Naghsh-e Jahan Stadium	75,000
Zob Ahan	Isfahan	Foolad Shahr Stadium	20,000

== Final classification ==
Pos	Team	Pld	W	D	L	GF	GA	GD	Pts	Qualification or relegation
1	Sepahan (C)	26	16	4	6	47	27	+20	52	Qualification for the 2004 AFC Champions League
2	Pas	26	13	6	7	37	23	+14	45	
3	Persepolis	26	11	11	4	30	21	+9	44	
4	Fajr	26	11	9	6	28	21	+7	42	
5	Paykan	26	10	7	9	27	24	+3	37	
6	Saipa	26	9	8	9	29	30	−1	35	
7	Foolad	26	9	7	10	34	36	−2	34	
8	Zob Ahan	26	10	4	12	22	29	−7	34	Qualification for the 2004 AFC Champions League
9	Esteghlal	26	8	8	10	32	30	+2	32	
10	Bargh	26	9	5	12	28	37	−9	32	
11	Est. Ahvaz	26	6	10	10	24	30	−6	28	
12	Aboumoslem	26	5	11	10	22	26	−4	26	
13	Sanat Naft (R)	26	6	8	12	25	34	−9	26	Relegation to the 2003–04 Azadegan League
14	Malavan (R)	26	6	8	12	17	34	−17	26	Relegation to the 2003–04 Azadegan League

Source: IPL Stats, Soccerway
Rules for classification: 1) Points; 2) Goal difference; 3) Goals scored.
(C) Champions; (R) Relegated

== Awards ==
- League Topscorer = Edmund Bezik
- Coach Of The Year = Farhad Kazemi
- Team Of The Year = Sepahan F.C.

== Results table ==
Last updated Jun 06 2003

Home \ Away	SEP	PAS	PRS	FJR	PAY	SAP	FOL	ZOB	EST	BGH	ESA	ABU	SNA	MLV
Sepahan		2–3	2–1	1–2	4–2	3–0	2–3	4–0	3–2	1–0	1–0	1–1	4–1	2–0
PAS Tehran	1–2		0–1	2–1	2–0	2–0	1–2	1–2	1–1	1–1	2–2	1–0	4–2	2–0
Persepolis	1–1	0–0		2–0	1–0	2–1	3–3	0–1	1–1	0–0	2–1	1–0	1–0	2–3
Fajr Sepasi	2–0	0–2	0–0		0–0	1–1	1–0	1–2	2–3	0–0	2–1	1–0	0–0	3–2
Paykan	0–2	0–0	1–1	1–0		3–1	2–1	0–0	1–0	1–0	1–1	4–1	1–2	4–0
Saipa	0–0	0–2	1–1	0–0	1–2		1–1	0–1	2–1	3–0	0–0	0–1	1–0	3–2
Foolad	1–3	1–0	0–2	2–2	0–0	2–0		0–1	1–2	2–5	2–1	2–1	3–1	2–0
Zob Ahan	0–1	0–1	3–2	0–1	0–1	0–1	2–1		0–3	4–0	0–1	1–1	2–3	1–0
Esteghlal	2–3	3–1	1–2	0–1	2–1	1–3	0–0	0–0		1–2	0–0	0–0	1–0	3–0
Bargh Shiraz	1–2	0–3	1–2	0–1	1–0	2–2	1–0	4–0	1–2		0–3	2–1	2–1	0–0
Est. Ahvaz	1–0	0–2	0–0	1–1	0–1	2–5	0–2	2–1	2–1	1–2		1–1	3–2	0–0
Aboumoslem	1–1	1–2	0–1	0–1	3–1	0–0	2–0	0–0	2–2	3–0	1–0		0–0	0–0
Sanat Naft	0–1	1–1	0–0	1–1	0–0	1–2	2–2	1–0	1–0	1–2	1–1	3–1		1–0
Malavan	2–1	1–0	1–1	0–4	1–0	0–1	1–1	0–1	0–0	2–1	0–0	1–1	1–0	

Source: http://www.iplstats.com/
Legend: Blue = home team win; Yellow = draw; Red = away team win.

== Player statistics ==
=== Top goal scorers ===
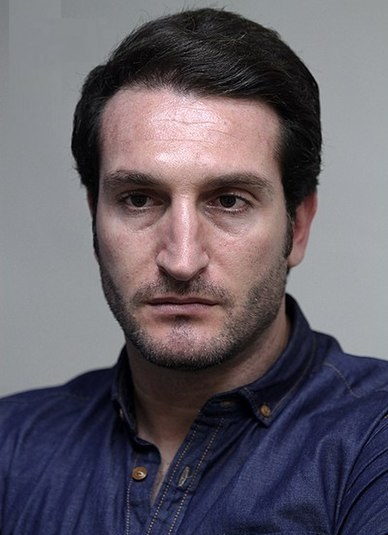
Edmond Bezik

13

- (Iran) Edmond Bezik (Sepahan)

12

- (Iran) Moharram Navidkia (Sepahan)

11

- (Iran) Reza Enayati (Aboomoslem)

9

- (Iran) Ali Alizadeh (Fajr Sepasi)

8

- (Iran) Mohammad Mansouri (Bargh Shiraz)
- (Iran) Mohammad Momeni (Saipa)
- (Iran) Behnam Seraj (Foolad)

== Participating in international competitions ==
2002–03 AFC Champions League

- Esteghlal
- Persepolis
