= Levon Stepanyan =

Armenian footballer

Personal information
- Full name: Levon Stepanyan
- Date of birth: 22 April 1971 (age 55)
- Place of birth: Yerevan, Soviet Union
- Height: 1.72 m (5 ft 8 in)
- Position: Midfielder

Senior career*
Years	Team	Apps	(Gls)
1990–1995	Ararat Yerevan		
1995–1996	Ararat Tehran		
1996–2001	Sepahan		
2001–2002	Ararat Tehran		
2002–2005	Sepahan	48	(7)
2005–2006	Zob Ahan	11	(0)
2006–2010	Sepahan Novin		

International career
1995	Armenia	1	(0)

Managerial career
- 2007–2010: Sepahan Novin (assistant)
- 2010–2013: FC Pyunik (assistant)
- 2013–2014: Rah Ahan (assistant)
- 2014–2015: Paykan (assistant)
- 2016–2017: Khoneh Be Khoneh (assistant)
- 2017–2018: Shahrdari Mahshahr (assistant)
- 2018–2019: Naft Masjed Soleyman (assistant)
- * Club domestic league appearances and goals

Levon Stepanyan (Armenian: Լեւոն Ստեփանյան; born 22 April 1971, in Yerevan) is a retired Armenian football midfielder player and a current coach who played most of his career for Sepahan and previously played for Ararat Yerevan, Zob Ahan and captained Sepahan Novin. Stepanyan was capped for Armenia on one occasion in a 2–1 win against Macedonia on 6 September 1995 in Skopje.
