= List of Esteghlal F.C. records and statistics =

Statistics of Esteghlal Football Club

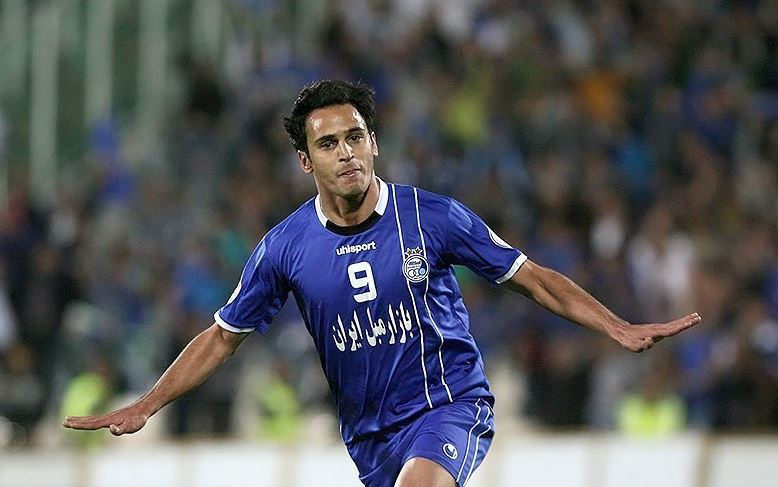
Arash Borhani is Esteghlal's all-time leading goalscorer with 107 goals in all competitions.

Esteghlal Football Club (Persian: باشگاه فوتبال استقلال, Bashgah-e Futbal-e Esteqlâl), commonly known as Esteghlal (Persian: استقلال, meaning 'The Independence'), is an Iranian football club based in capital of the Tehran province Tehran, that competes in the Persian Gulf Pro League. The club was founded in 1946 as Docharkheh Savaran (Persian: دوچرخه سواران; meaning 'The Cyclists') and previously known as Taj (Persian: تاج; meaning 'The Crown') between 1949 and 1979. This page details Esteghlal Football Club records and statistics.

== Honours ==
Esteghlal holds 39 official championship titles in provincial, national and continental cups.

Esteghlal F.C. official honours
Type		Competition	Titles	Seasons	
Domestic	National				
Domestic	National	League	10	1957, 1970–71, 1974–75, 1989–90, 1997–98, 2000–01, 2005–06, 2008–09, 2012–13, 2021–22	
Domestic	National	Hazfi Cup	8	1976–77, 1995–96, 1999–2000, 2001–02, 2007–08, 2011–12, 2017–18, 2024–25	
Domestic	National	Super Cup	1	2022	
Domestic	National	Provincial (High Level)	Tehran League	13	1949–50, 1952–53, 1956–57, 1957–58, 1959–60, 1960–61, 1962–63, 1968–69, 1970–1971, 1972–73, 1983–84, 1985–86, 1991–92
Domestic	Tehran Hazfi Cup	Provincial (High Level)	4	1946–47, 1950–51, 1958–59, 1960–61	
Domestic	Tehran Super Cup	Provincial (High Level)	1*	1994	
Domestic	Continental		AFC Champions League	2**	1970, 1990–91

- record
- * shared record
- ** Iran record

=== Domestic ===
==== League ====
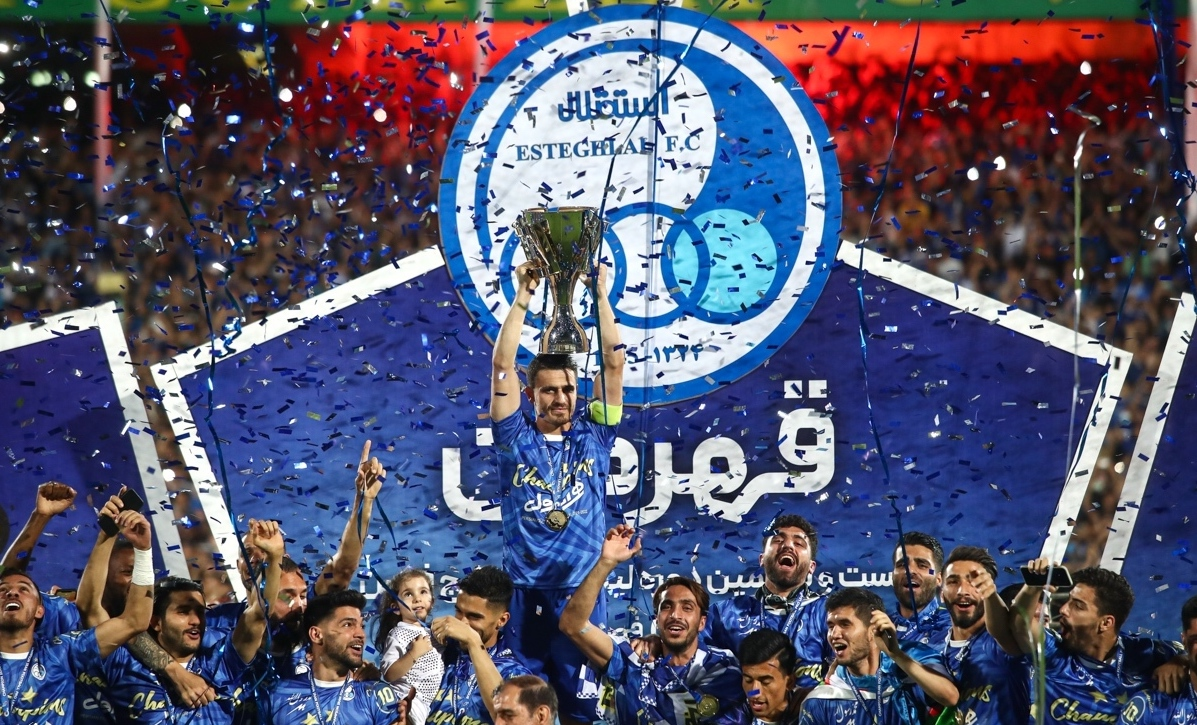
Esteghlal were crowned champions ending the 2021-22 Persian Gulf Pro League season without a single defeat – the first Iranian team ever to do so in a 30-game league season.

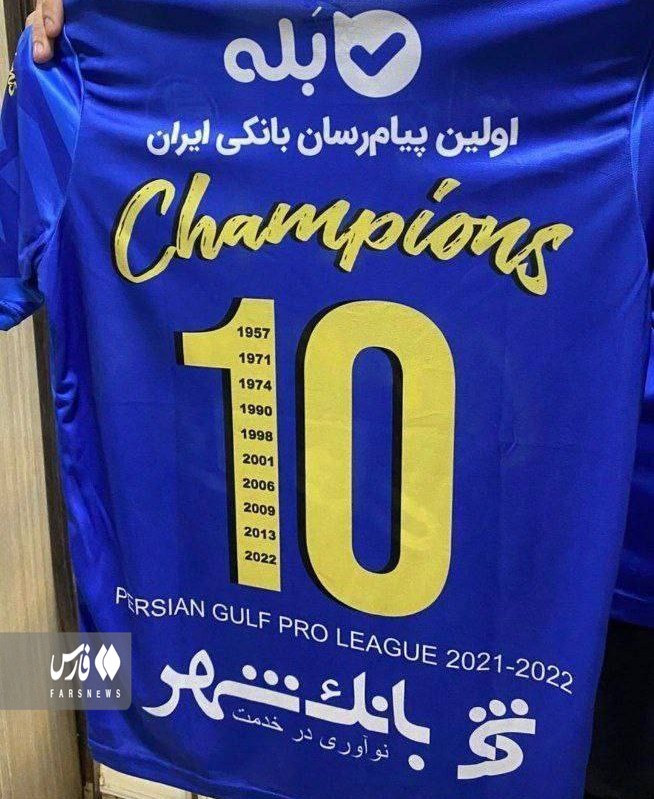
Esteghlal club's championship kit in Season 2021–22 to mark the tenth championship in the History of Iranian football leagues.

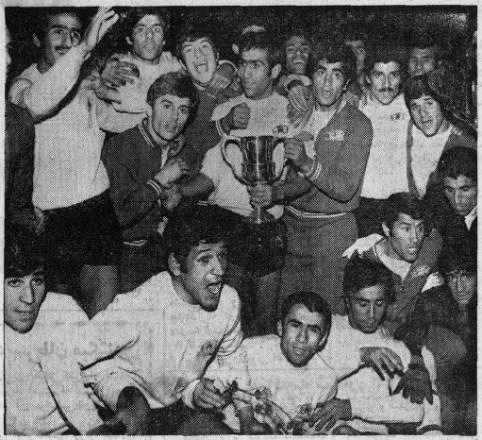
Taj (Esteghlal) championship in the 1970 Asian Champion Club, first continental title for Taj and an Iranian club.

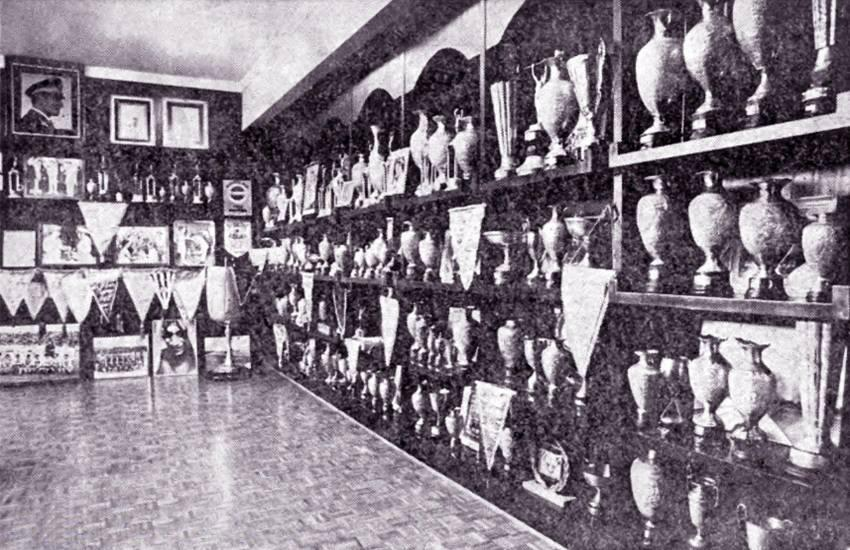
The Taj Club Museum, which was looted after the 1978 revolution. Most of the museum's trophies were won by the club's football team.

- Iran League

(gold) Winners (9): 1970–71, 1974–75, 1989–90, 1997–98, 2000–01, 2005–06, 2008–09, 2012–13, 2021–22
(silver) Runners-up (11): 1973–74, 1991–92, 1994–95, 1998–99, 1999–2000, 2001–02, 2003–04, 2010–11, 2016–17, 2019–20, 2023–24

- Iran Championship Cup

(gold) Winners (1): 1957

==== Cups ====
- Hazfi Cup (record)

(gold) Winners (8): 1976–77, 1995–96, 1999–2000, 2001–02, 2007–08, 2011–12, 2017–18, 2024–25
(silver) Runners-up (7): 1989–90, 1998–99, 2003–04, 2015–16, 2019–20, 2020–21, 2022–23

- Super Cup

(gold) Winners (1): 2022
(silver) Runners-up (2): 2018, 2025

==== Provincial (High Level) ====
- Tehran League (record)

(gold) Winners (13): 1949–50, 1952–53, 1956–57, 1957–58, 1959–60, 1960–61, 1962–63, 1968–69, 1970–1971, 1972–73, 1983–84, 1985–86, 1991–92
(silver) Runners-up (7): 1946–47, 1951–52, 1958–59, 1969–70, 1982–83, 1989–90, 1990–91

- Tehran Hazfi Cup

(gold) Winners (4): 1946–47, 1950–51, 1958–59, 1960–61
(silver) Runners-up (3): 1945–46, 1957–58, 1969–70

- Tehran Super Cup (shared record)

(gold) Winners (1): 1994

=== Continental ===
- AFC Champions League Elite (Iran record)

(gold) Winners (2): 1970, 1990–91
(silver) Runners-up (2): 1991, 1998–99
(bronze) Third place (3): 1971, 2001–02, 2013
- Asian Cup Winners' Cup
  Fourth place (2): 1996, 2000–01

=== Doubles and Treble ===
Esteghlal has achieved the Double on 5 occasions in its history:

- Iran League and Tehran League
  - 1957–58 Season
  - 1970–71 Season
- Tehran League and Tehran Hazfi Cup
  - 1958–59 Season
  - 1960–61 Season
- AFC Champions League and Tehran League
  - 1990–91 Season

Esteghlal has achieved the Treble on 1 occasions in its history:

- AFC Champions League and Iran League and Tehran League
  - 1970–71 Season

=== Minor Tournaments ===
==== International ====
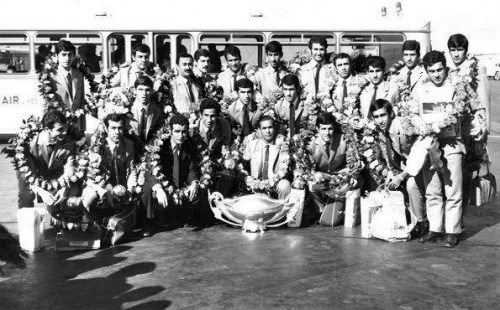
Taj players and staff after winning 1969 Mills Cup (DCM Trophy), the first international trophy ever won by an Iranian side.

- (India) DCM Trophy
  - Winners (4): 1969, 1970, 1971, 1989
- (India) Bordoloi Trophy
  - Winners (1): 1989
- Qatar Independence Cup
  - Winners (1): 1991
- Turkmenistan President's Cup
  - Winners (1): 1998
- (Iran) Caspian International Cup
  - Winners (1): 1998

==== Domestic ====
- (Iran) Taj Cup
  - Winner (1): 1958
- (Iran) Doosti Cup
  - Winners (1): 1972
- (Iran) Ettehad Cup
  - Winners (1): 1973
- (Iran) Basij Festival
  - Winner (1): 1992
- Iran Third Division
  - Winner (1): 1993
- (Iran) Kish Quartet Competition Cup
  - Winners (1): 1998
- (Iran) Iranian Football League Cup
  - Winners (1): 2002
- (Iran) Solh va Doosti Cup
  - Winners (1): 2005

== Rankings ==
The club is currently ranked 160 in the world by IFFHS.

=== Top Ten Asian's clubs of the 20th Century ===
Esteghlal was placed 3rd in IFFHS continental Clubs of the 20th Century:

Position	Team	Country	Pts.
1	Al-Hilal	Saudi Arabia	93,50
2	Yokohama F. Marinos	Japan	66,25
3	Esteghlal Tehran	Iran	56,00
4	Persepolis	Iran	55,00
5	Seongnam Ilhwa Chunma	South Korea	51,00
6	Al-Nassr	Saudi Arabia	47,50
7	Pohang Steelers	South Korea	45,25
8	Tokyo Verdy	Japan	42,00
9	Liaoning Hongyun	China	38,00
10	Thai Farmers Bank	Thailand	33,75

== Statistics ==
=== Official Matches ===
- Most goals scored in a match:
  - 18 – 0 (1 time) (Iran record)
  - 13 – 0 (1 time)
  - 13 – 1 (1 time)
  - 11 – 0 (2 time)
  - 11 – 1 (1 time)
  - 10 – 0 (4 time)
  - 10 – 1 (1 time)
- Player with a most goal in a single match:
  - Ali Jabbari with 5 goals (3 time)
  - Arash Borhani with 5 goals

=== Statistics in IPL ===
- Seasons in IPL: 26 (all) (record)
- Best position in IPL: First (2005–06, 2008–2009, 2012–13, 2021–22)
- Worst position in IPL: 13 (2007–08)
- Most Points scored in a season: 68 (2021–22) (record)
- Fewest losses in a season: 0 Loss (2021–22) (record)
- Most goals scored in a season: 70 (2008–09) (record)
- Most goals scored in a match:
  - 7 – 1 (1 time)
  - 6 – 0 (1 time)
  - 6 – 1 (1 time)
  - 6 – 2 (1 time)
  - 5 – 0 (5 time)
- Most goals conceded in a match: 4 – 1 (3 times)
- Player with a most goal in a single match:
  - Samad Marfavi with 4 goals
  - Alireza Akbarpour with 4 goals

=== Statistics in ACC/ACL/ACWC ===
- Most goals scored in a match:
  - 8 – 0 (1 time)
  - 7 – 0 (1 time)
- Most goals conceded in a match: 1 – 6 (1 time)
- Player with the most goals in a single match:
  - Farhad Majidi with 4 goals
  - Ali Jabari with 3 goals
  - Farhad Majidi with 3 goals
  - Ali Latifi with 3 goals
  - Mame Thiam with 3 goals

=== Statistics in Hazfi Cup ===
- Most goals scored in a match:
  - 13 – 0 (1 time)
  - 10 – 1 (1 time)
  - 9 – 0 (1 time)
  - 8 – 1 (2 time)
- Most goals conceded in a match: 0 – 3 (1 time)
- Player with the most goals in a single match:
  - Arash Borhani with 5 goals
  - Alireza Akbarpour with 4 goals
  - Adel Hardani with 4 goals
  - Dariush Yazdabi with 4 goals
  - Mehdi Seyed-Salehi with 4 goals

== Player records ==
=== Appearances ===
List of Esteghlal F.C players with 200 or more appearances
#	Name	Pos	Club career	Appearances	Goals
1	Mahmoud Fekri	Defender	1992–1996; 1998–2007	345	22
2	Pejman Montazeri	Defender	2007–2014; 2017–2019	318	17
3	Amir Hossein Sadeghi	Defender	2002–2008; 2009–2011; 2012–2015	316	16
4	Javad Zarincheh	Defender	1987–1991; 1993–2003	305	2
5	Khosro Heydari	Midfielder	2008–2010; 2011–2019	304	8
6	Arash Borhani	Forward	2007–2016	292	107
7	Rouzbeh Cheshmi	Midfielder	2015–2020; 2021–	273	13
8	Sadegh Varmazyar	Defender	1984–1997	271	16
9	Mehdi Rahmati	Goalkeeper	2005–2007; 2011–2014; 2015–2019	265	0
10	Farhad Majidi	Forward	1997–1998; 2000; 2007–2011; 2012–2013	256	94
11	Hossein Hosseini	Goalkeeper	2012–2025	240	1

- Most League Appearances: Amir Hossein Sadeghi (258)
- Most League Goalkeeper Appearances: Vahid Talebloo (196)
- Player who has won most IPL titles: Mojtaba Jabbari (with 3 Championships)

=== Goalscorers ===
- All-time top scorer: Arash Borhani with 107 goals
- All-time League top scorer: Arash Borhani with 80 goals
- All-time AFC Champions League top scorer: Farhad Majidi with 14 goals
- Most goals in a season : 27 (Arash Borhani, 2008–09)
- Most League goals in a season : 21 (Reza Enayati, 2005–06)
- Most AFC Champions League goals in a season : 6 (Abdolsamad Marfavi, 1990–91)
- Most goals in an Hazfi Cup match : 5 (Arash Borhani)
- Most goals in an AFC Champions League match : 3 (Ali Jabbari) & (Mame Baba Thiam)
- First Goalscorer in Tehran derby: Ahmad Monshizadeh
- Most Goalscorer in Tehran derby: 5 (Gholam Hossein Mazloumi)

==== Top goalscorers ====
Top scorers
#	Player	Goals
1	Arash Borhani	107
2	Farhad Majidi	94
3	Ali Jabbari	92
4	Gholam Hossein Mazloumi	81
5	Samad Marfavi	79
6	Parviz Mazloumi	65
7	Reza Enayati	64
8	Abdolali Changiz	47
9	Siavash Akbarpour	46
10	Ali Samereh	43

== Managerial records ==
- First full-time manager: Ali Danaeifard managed Taj from March 1946 to August 1953
- Longest-serving manager: Ali Danaeifard – 14 years from 1953 to May 1967
- Shortest tenure as manager: Mick McDermott (caretaker) – 12 days from 21 September 2017 to 2 October 2017
- Highest win percentage: Parviz Koozehkanani (caretaker) 100%
- Lowest win percentage: Javad Zarincheh (caretaker) 0%

== See also ==
- Esteghlal F.C.

Achievements
Preceded by Maccabi Tel Aviv (Israel)	Asian Champions League; 1970	Succeeded by Maccabi Tel Aviv (Israel)
Preceded by Liaoning FC (China)	Asian Champions League; 1990–91	Succeeded by Al-Hilal (Saudi Arabia)
