= 1999–2000 Esteghlal F.C. season =

Esteghlal F.C.
1999–2000 season
- President: Ali Fathollahzadeh
- Head coach: Yevgeni Skomorokhov (until 23 February 2000); Mansour Pourheidari (From 23 February 2000)
- Stadium: Azadi Stadium
- Azadegan League: Runners-up
- Hazfi Cup: Winners
- Asian Cup Winners' Cup: Second round
- Top goalscorer: League: Ali Latifi (5); All: Ali Latifi (14)
Home colours	Away colours

The 1999–2000 season are the Esteghlal Football Club's 8th season in the Azadegan League, and their 6th consecutive season in the top division of Iranian football. They are also competing in the Hazfi Cup and Asian Cup Winners' Cup, and 55th year in existence as a football club.

== Player ==
As of 1 September 1999.

Note: Flags indicate national team as defined under FIFA eligibility rules; some limited exceptions apply. Players may hold more than one non-FIFA nationality.

No.	Pos.	Nation	Player
—	GK	IRI	Parviz Boroumand
—	GK	IRI	Masoud Ghasemi
—	GK	IRI	Hadi Tabatabaei
—	GK	IRI	Mohammad Ali Yahyavi
—	DF	IRI	Mahmoud Fekri
—	DF	IRI	Reza Hassanzadeh
—	DF	IRI	Javad Zarincheh
—	DF	IRI	Sohrab Bakhtiarizadeh
—	DF	IRI	Mohammad Khorramgah
—	MF	IRI	Kazem Mahmoudi
—	MF	IRI	Ali Chini
—	MF	IRI	Mohammad Taghavi
—	MF	IRI	Attila Hejazi
—	MF	IRI	Javid Shokri
—	MF	IRI	Mohammad Navazi

No.	Pos.	Nation	Player
—	MF	IRI	Alireza Nikbakht
—	MF	IRI	Farzad Majidi
—	MF	IRI	Afshin Hajipour
—	MF	IRI	Dariush Yazdani
—	MF	IRI	Behzad Dadashzadeh
—	MF	IRI	Sattar Hamedani
—	MF	IRI	Adel Hardani
—	MF	IRI	Sirous Dinmohammadi
—	FW	IRI	Farhad Majidi
—	FW	IRI	Alireza Akbarpour
—	FW	IRI	Mohammad Momeni
—	FW	IRI	Fred Malekian
—	FW	IRI	Ali Latifi
—	FW	IRI	Ali Mousavi
—	FW	IRI	Mohsen Garousi

== Pre-season and friendlies ==
2 June 1999	Fortuna Köln (Germany)	0 – 0	(Iran) Esteghlal	Leverkusen, Germany

5 June 1999	Bayer 04 Leverkusen (Germany)	4 – 1	(Iran) Esteghlal	Leverkusen, Germany
			Farhad Majidi

8 June 1999	Borussia Mönchengladbach (Germany)	0 – 1	(Iran) Esteghlal	Leverkusen, Germany
			Farhad Majidi

== Competitions ==
=== Overview ===
Competition	Started round	Current position / round	Final position / round	First match	Last match
Azadegan League	—	—	Runners-up	13 Augustus 1999	21 May 2000
Hazfi Cup	Round of 16	—	Winner	8 December 1999	16 June 2000
Asian Cup Winners' Cup	—	—	Second round	14 September 2000	17 November 2000

Updated to match played 13 October 2018
Source: Competitions

=== Azadegan League ===
==== Standings ====
Pos	Team	Pld	W	D	L	GF	GA	GD	Pts	Qualification or relegation
1	Persepolis (C)	26	15	9	2	45	23	+22	54	Qualification for the 2000–01 Asian Club Championship
2	Esteghlal	26	12	11	3	32	16	+16	47	Qualification for the 2000–01 Asian Cup Winners' Cup
3	Fajr Sepasi	26	11	11	4	37	18	+19	44	
4	Sepahan	26	11	9	6	28	19	+9	42	
5	Zob Ahan	26	11	6	9	35	29	+6	39	

Updated to match(es) played on 1 September 2018. Source: RSSSF
Rules for classification: 1) Points; 2) Goal difference; 3) Goals scored.
(C) Champions

==== Results summary ====
Overall								Home						Away					
Pld	W	D	L	GF	GA	GD	Pts	W	D	L	GF	GA	GD	W	D	L	GF	GA	GD
26	12	11	3	32	16	+16	47	6	6	1	14	6	+8	6	5	2	18	10	+8

Last updated: 17 June 2000.
Source: RSSSF

==== Results by round ====
Round	1	2	3	4	5	6	7	8	9	10	11	12	13	14	15	16	17	18	19	20	21	22	23	24	25	26
Ground	A	H	A	H	A	A	A	H	A	H	A	A	H	H	A	H	A	H	H	H	A	H	A	H	H	A
Result	W	D	W	W	D	L	W	W	W	W	D	L	W	D	W	W	D	L	D	D	D	D	W	W	D	D

Source: Competitive matches
A = Away; H = Home; W = Win; D = Draw; L = Loss

==== Matches ====
Win Draw Loss Postponed

13 August 1999 1	Tractor Sazi	1 – 3	Esteghlal	Tabriz
	Davoud Rostami 8'		Mohammad Navazi 25' (pen.); Alireza Nikbakht 32'; Farhad Majidi 50'	Stadium: Imam Khomeini Stadium

20 August 1999 2	Esteghlal	1 – 1	Saipa	Tehran
	Farhad Majidi 85'		Pejman Jamshidi 88'	Stadium: Azadi Stadium

14 October 1999 3	Sepahan	1 – 4	Esteghlal	Isfahan
	Majid Basirat 75'		Ali Latifi 30'; Behzad Dadashzadeh 40'; Alireza Nikbakht 79'; Mohammad Navazi 85' (pen.)

2 November 1999 4	Esteghlal	2 – 0	Chooka Talesh	Tehran
	Mahmoud Fekri 8'; Farhad Majidi 81'			Stadium: Azadi Stadium

24 September 1999 5	Persepolis	0 – 0	Esteghlal	Tehran
				Stadium: Azadi Stadium

28 September 1999 6	Foolad	2 – 0	Esteghlal	Ahvaz
	Amir Khalifeh-Asl 48', 59'			Stadium: Takhti Stadium

3 October 1999 7	Bahman	0 – 3	Esteghlal	Tehran
			Farhad Majidi 41'; Mohammad Navazi 47' (pen.); Ahmad Momenzadeh 87'	Stadium: Azadi Stadium

7 October 1999 8	Esteghlal	2 – 0	Irsotter	Tehran
	Ali Latifi 44'; Alireza Nikbakht 50'			Stadium: Azadi Stadium

19 October 1999 9	Sanat Naft	0 – 1	Esteghlal	Abadan
			Sattar Hamedani 37' (pen.)	Stadium: Takhti Stadium

24 October 1999 10	Esteghlal	2 – 1	Zob Ahan	Tehran
	Mahmoud Fekri 23', 25'		Reza Sahebi 67'	Stadium: Azadi Stadium

29 October 1999 11	PAS Tehran	1 – 1	Esteghlal	Tehran
	Aref Mohammadvand 38'		Alireza Akbarpour 35'	Stadium: Azadi Stadium

8 November 1999 12	Fajr Sepasi	3 – 0	Esteghlal	Shiraz
	Reza Rezaei-Kamal 70' (pen.); Esmaeili 82'			Stadium: Hafezieh Stadium

14 November 1999 13	Esteghlal	1 – 0	Aboomoslem	Tehran
	Ali Latifi 55'			Stadium: Azadi Stadium

24 January 2000 14	Esteghlal	1 – 1	Tractor Sazi	Tehran
	Behzad Dadashzadeh 50'		Ali Zarei 30'	Stadium: Azadi Stadium

13 February 2000 15	Saipa	0 – 1	Esteghlal	Tehran
			Kazem Mahmoudi 55'	Stadium: Azadi Stadium

30 January 2000 16	Esteghlal	2 – 1	Sepahan	Tehran
	Mohammad Niksirat 48'; Alireza Akbarpour 76'		Levon Stepanyan 57'	Stadium: Azadi Stadium

8 February 2000 17	Chooka Talesh	0 – 0	Esteghlal	Talesh
				Stadium: Pourya-ye Vali Stadium

27 February 2000 18	Esteghlal	0 – 2	Persepolis	Tehran
			Mehdi Hasheminasab 8'; Payan Rafat 81'	Stadium: Azadi Stadium

23 February 2000 19	Esteghlal	0 – 0	Foolad	Tehran
				Stadium: Azadi Stadium

3 March 2000 20	Esteghlal	0 – 0	Bahman	Tehran
				Stadium: Azadi Stadium

8 March 2000 21	Irsotter	1 – 1	Esteghlal	Noshahr
	Omid Rezaei 72'		Arastoo Mohammadi 74'	Stadium: Shohada-ye Nowshahr Stadium

12 March 2000 22	Esteghlal	0 – 0	Sanat Naft	Tehran
				Stadium: Azadi Stadium

28 April 2000 23	Zob Ahan	1 – 4	Esteghlal	Fooladshahr
	Davoud Mahabadi 63'		Ali Latifi 26'; Alireza Akbarpour 53'; Dariush Yazdani 70'; Mohammad Navazi 79'	Stadium: Fooladshahr Stadium

5 May 2000 24	Esteghlal	3 – 0	PAS Tehran	Tehran
	Ali Latifi 15'; Behzad Dadashzadeh 29'; Mahmoud Fekri 53'			Stadium: Azadi Stadium

11 May 2000 25	Esteghlal	0 – 0	Fajr Sepasi	Tehran
				Stadium: Azadi Stadium

21 May 2000 26	Aboomoslem	0 – 0	Esteghlal	Mashhad
				Stadium: Takhti Stadium

=== Hazfi Cup ===
==== Round of 16 ====
8 December 1999 First leg	Mes Kerman	0 – 3	Esteghlal	Kerman
			Mahmoud Fekri 42'; Alireza Akbarpour 56'; Ali Latifi 58'	Stadium: Salimikia Stadium

15 December 1999 Second leg	Esteghlal	5 – 0 (8 – 0 agg.)	Mes Kerman	Tehran
	Alireza Akbarpour 49'; Afshin Hajipour 56'; Mohammad Navazi 60' (pen.); Ali Latifi 61' 75' (pen.)			Stadium: Takhti Stadium

==== 1/8 finals ====
20 April 2000	Esteghlal	2 – 1 (a.e.t.)	Keshavarz	Tehran
	Behzad Dadashzadeh 69'; Sattar Hamedani 111'		Hossein Pashaei 73'	Stadium: Azadi Stadium

==== Quarterfinals ====
16 May 2000 First leg	Irsotter	1 – 1	Esteghlal	Noshahr
	Omidreza Ramezani 16'		Bahman Tahmasebi 1'	Stadium: Shohada

26 May 2000 Second leg	Esteghlal	6 – 0 (7 – 1 agg.)	Irsotter	Tehran
	Alireza Nikbakht 19'; Dariush Yazdani 23', 49', 85', 91'; Behzad Nashta 29' (o.g.)			Stadium: Azadi Stadium

==== Semifinal ====
31 May 2000	Esteghlal	2 – 1	Saipa	Tehran
	Dariush Yazdani 36', 78'		Mojtaba Taghavi 50'	Stadium: Azadi Stadium

==== Final ====
16 June 2000	Esteghlal	3 – 1	Bahman	Tehran
	Mohammad Navazi 45', 57'; Ali Latifi 82'		Reza Jabbari 90'	Stadium: Azadi Stadium

=== Asian Cup Winners' Cup ===
==== First round ====
14 September 2000 First leg	Esteghlal (Iran)	7 – 0	(Lebanon) Homenmen	Tehran, Iran
	Ali Latifi 20', 55', 85'; Farhad Majidi 34', 64', 66'; Alireza Akbarpour 67'			Stadium: Azadi Stadium

22 September 2000 Second leg	Homenmen (Lebanon)	0 – 8 (0 – 15 agg.)	(Iran) Esteghlal	Beirut, Lebanon
			Alireza Nikbakht 32'; Ali Latifi 38', 89'; Ahmad Momenzadeh 42'; Farhad Majidi 63', 75', 85', 86'	Stadium: Azadi Stadium

==== Second round ====
3 November 2000 First leg	Al Ittihad (Saudi Arabia)	1 – 0	(Iran) Esteghlal	Jeddah, Saudi Arabia
	Hamzah Idris 27' (pen.)

17 November 2000 Second leg	Esteghlal (Iran)	1 – 1 (1 – 2 agg.)	(Saudi Arabia) Al Ittihad	Tehran, Iran
	Mahmoud Fekri 75'		Muhammad Hasavi 90'	Stadium: Azadi Stadium

== See also ==
- 1999–2000 Azadegan League
- 1999–2000 Hazfi Cup
- 1999–2000 Asian Cup Winners' Cup
