= List of Esteghlal F.C. honours =

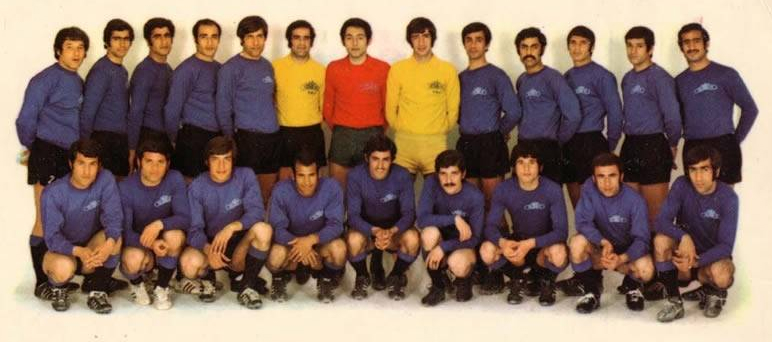
TAJ squad in 1970 as national and continental champions

Esteghlal Football Club (Persian: باشگاه فوتبال استقلال, Bashgah-e Futbal-e Esteqlâl), commonly known as Esteghlal (Persian: استقلال, meaning 'The Independence'), is an Iranian football club based in capital Tehran, that competes in the Persian Gulf Pro League. The club was founded in 1945 as Docharkheh Savaran (Persian: دوچرخه سواران; meaning 'The Cyclists') and previously known as Taj (Persian: تاج; meaning 'The Crown') between 1949 and 1979.

Esteghlal club has a won a total 39 trophies, including the Iranian Leagues 10 times, Hazfi Cup a record of 8 times, Iran Super Cup 1 time, Tehran Club Championship a record 13 times, Tehran Hazfi Cup 4 times, Tehran Super Cup a shared record 1 time and Asian Club Championship Iran's record 2 times. Esteghlal is the only Iran club to win an international trophy more than once.

Esteghlal has won 16 Minor Tournaments throughout its history.

This page details Esteghlal Football Club honours and achievements.

== Honours ==
Esteghlal has 39 official championship titles in provincial, national and continental cups.

Esteghlal F.C. official honours
Type		Competition	Titles	Seasons
Domestic	National			
Domestic	National	League	9	1970–71, 1974–75, 1989–90, 1997–98, 2000–01, 2005–06, 2008–09, 2012–13, 2021–22
Domestic	National	Hazfi Cup	8	1976–77, 1995–96, 1999–2000, 2001–02, 2007–08, 2011–12, 2017–18, 2024–25
Domestic	National	Super Cup	1	2022
Domestic	National	Championship Cup	1	1957
Domestic	Provincial (High Level)	Tehran League	13	1949–50, 1952–53, 1956–57, 1957–58, 1959–60, 1960–61, 1962–63, 1968–69, 1970–1971, 1972–73, 1983–84, 1985–86, 1991–92
Domestic	Provincial (High Level)	Tehran Hazfi Cup	4	1946–47, 1950–51, 1958–59, 1960–61
Domestic	Provincial (High Level)	Tehran Super Cup	1*	1994
Continental		AFC Champions League	2**	1970, 1990–91

- record
- * shared record
- ** Iran record

=== Domestic ===
==== League ====
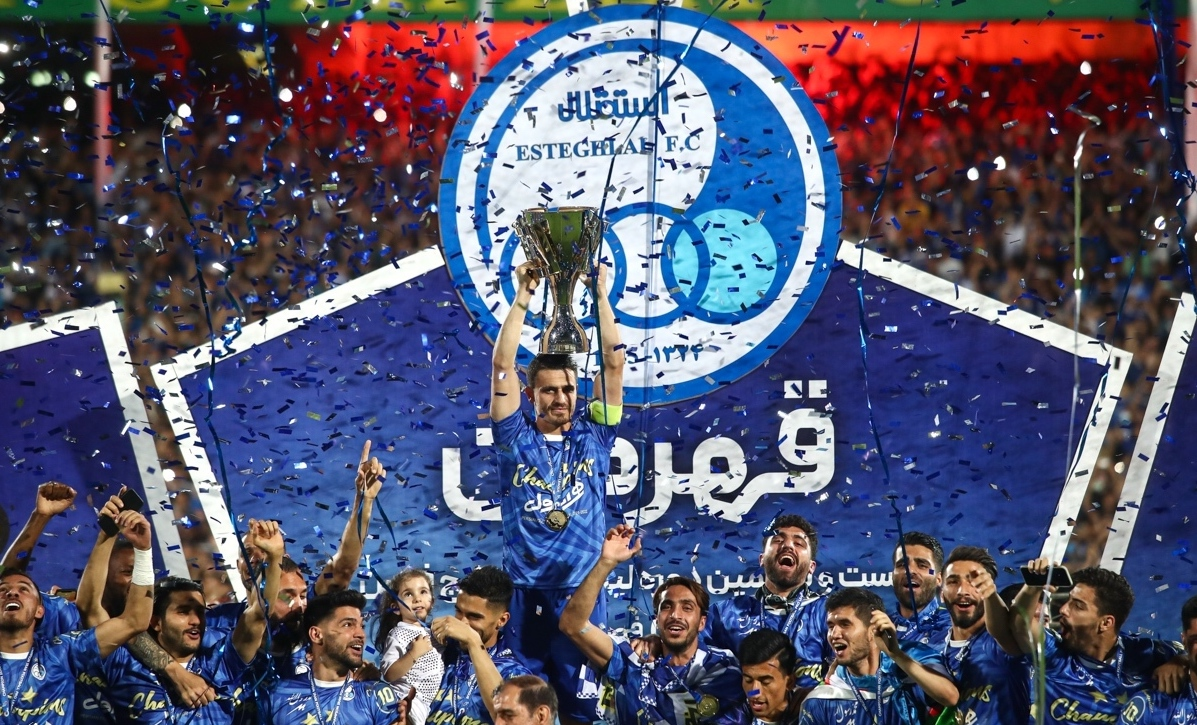
Esteghlal were crowned champions ending the 2021-22 Persian Gulf Pro League season without a single defeat – the first Iranian team ever to do so in a 30-game league season.

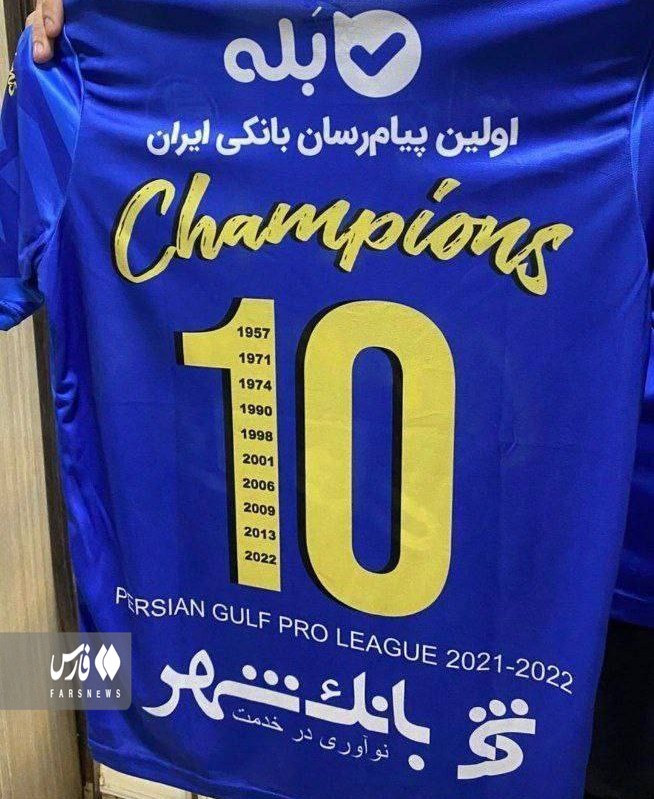
Esteghlal club's championship kit in Season 2021–22 to mark the tenth championship in the History of Iranian football leagues.

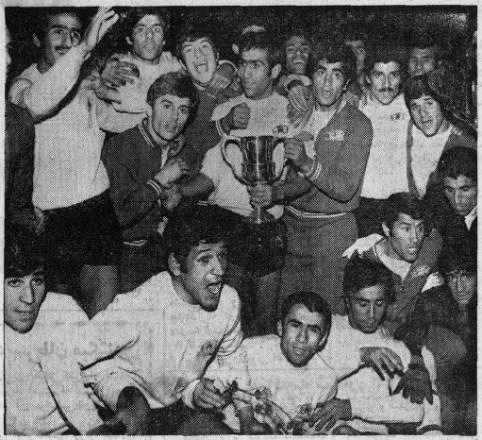
Taj (Esteghlal) championship in the 1970 Asian Champion Club, first continental title for Taj and an Iranian club.

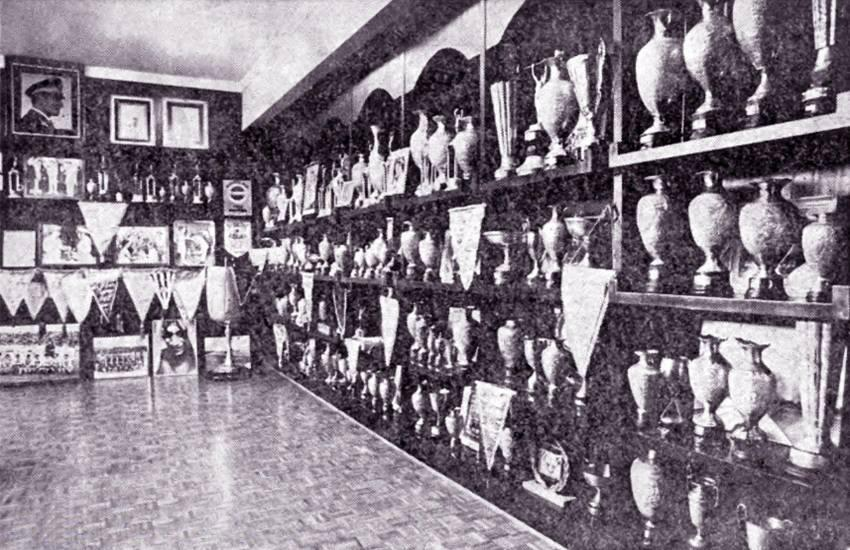
The Taj Club Museum, which was looted after the 1978 revolution. Most of the museum's trophies were won by the club's football team.

- Iran League

(gold) Winners (9): 1970–71, 1974–75, 1989–90, 1997–98, 2000–01, 2005–06, 2008–09, 2012–13, 2021–22
(silver) Runners-up (11): 1973–74, 1991–92, 1994–95, 1998–99, 1999–2000, 2001–02, 2003–04, 2010–11, 2016–17, 2019–20, 2023–24

==== Cups ====
- Hazfi Cup (record)

(gold) Winners (8): 1976–77, 1995–96, 1999–2000, 2001–02, 2007–08, 2011–12, 2017–18, 2024–25
(silver) Runners-up (7): 1989–90, 1998–99, 2003–04, 2015–16, 2019–20, 2020–21, 2022–2023

- Super Cup

(gold) Winners (1): 2022
(silver) Runners-up (1): 2018

==== Provincial (High Level) ====
- Tehran League (record)

(gold) Winners (13): 1949–50, 1952–53, 1956–57, 1957–58, 1959–60, 1960–61, 1962–63, 1968–69, 1970–1971, 1972–73, 1983–84, 1985–86, 1991–92
(silver) Runners-up (7): 1946–47, 1951–52, 1958–59, 1969–70, 1982–83, 1989–90, 1990–91

- Tehran Hazfi Cup

(gold) Winners (4): 1946–47, 1950–51, 1958–59, 1960–61
(silver) Runners-up (3): 1945–46, 1957–58, 1969–70

- Tehran Super Cup (shared record)

(gold) Winners (1): 1994

=== Continental ===
- AFC Champions League (Iran record)

(gold) Winners (2): 1970, 1990–91
(silver) Runners-up (2): 1991, 1998–99
(bronze) Third place (2): 1971, 2001–02

=== Doubles and Treble ===
Esteghlal has achieved the Double on 5 occasions in its history:

- Iran League and Tehran League
  - 1957–58 Season
  - 1970–71 Season
- Tehran League and Tehran Hazfi Cup
  - 1958–59 Season
  - 1960–61 Season
- AFC Champions League and Tehran League
  - 1990–91 Season

Esteghlal has achieved the Treble on 1 occasions in its history:

- AFC Champions League and Iran League and Tehran League
  - 1970–71 Season

=== Minor Tournaments ===
==== International ====
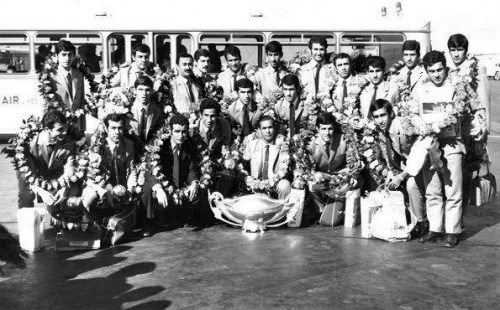
Taj players and staff after winning 1969 Mills Cup (DCM Trophy), the first international trophy ever won by an Iranian side.

- (India) DCM Trophy
  - Winners (4): 1969, 1970, 1971, 1989
- (India) Bordoloi Trophy
  - Winners (1): 1989
- Qatar Independence Cup
  - Winners (1): 1991
- Turkmenistan President's Cup
  - Winners (1): 1998
- (Iran) Caspian International Cup
  - Winners (1): 1998

==== Domestic ====
- (Iran) Taj Cup
  - Winner (1): 1958
- (Iran) Doosti Cup
  - Winners (1): 1972
- (Iran) Ettehad Cup
  - Winners (1): 1973
- (Iran) Basij Festival
  - Winner (1): 1992
- Iran Third Division
  - Winner (1): 1993
- (Iran) Kish Quartet Competition Cup
  - Winners (1): 1998
- (Iran) Iranian Football League Cup
  - Winners (1): 2002
- (Iran) Solh va Doosti Cup
  - Winners (1): 2005

Achievements
Preceded by Maccabi Tel Aviv (Israel)	Asian Champions League; 1970	Succeeded by Maccabi Tel Aviv (Israel)
Preceded by Liaoning FC (China)	Asian Champions League; 1990–91	Succeeded by Al-Hilal (Saudi Arabia)
