= 2001–02 Sepahan F.C. season =

Sepahan
2001–02 season
- Chairman: Mohammad Reza Saket
- Manager: Stanko Poklepović
- Stadium: Naghsh-e Jahan Stadium
- 1st Pro League: 9th
- Hazfi Cup: Semi-final
Home colours	Away colours	Third colours

The 2001–02 season was Sepahan's 1st season in the 1st Pro League, and their 19nd consecutive season in the top division of Iranian Football and 65nd year in existence as a football club. They competed in the Hazfi Cup.

== Matches ==
=== Pro league ===
==== League table ====
Pos	Team	Pld	W	D	L	GF	GA	GD	Pts
7	Paykan	26	11	5	10	28	22	+6	38
8	Bargh	26	9	10	7	28	25	+3	37
9	Sepahan	26	7	11	8	22	22	0	32
10	Fajr	26	6	9	11	15	20	−5	27
11	Saipa	26	6	9	11	24	30	−6	27

Updated to match(es) played on 1 Sep 2018. Source: IPL Stats, Soccerway
Rules for classification: 1) Points; 2) Goal difference; 3) Goals scored.

==== Results summary ====
Overall								Home						Away					
Pld	W	D	L	GF	GA	GD	Pts	W	D	L	GF	GA	GD	W	D	L	GF	GA	GD
26	7	11	8	22	22	0	32	5	4	4	11	8	+3	2	7	4	11	14	−3

Last updated: 25 August 2018.

==== Results by round ====
Round	1	2	3	4	5	6	7	8	9	10	11	12	13	14	15	16	17	18	19	20	21	22	23	24	25	26
Ground	H	A	H	A	H	H	A	H	A	H	A	H	A	A	H	A	H	A	A	H	A	H	A	H	A	H
Result	D	D	D	D	W	W	D	W	D	L	W	W	L	W	D	L	L	L	D	L	D	L	L	W	D	D

Source: flashscores.co.uk
A = Away; H = Home; W = Win; D = Draw; L = Loss

==== Matches ====
Win Draw Loss Postponed

Date Round	Home	Score	Away	Location

11/2/2001 1	Sepahan	0–0	Fajr	Isfahan
				Stadium: Naghsh-e Jahan

11/18/2001 2	Foolad	1–1	Sepahan	Ahvaz

11/23/2001 3	Sepahan	0–0	Persepolis	Isfahan
				Stadium: Naghsh-e Jahan

11/27/2001 4	Tractor	0–0	Sepahan	Tabriz

12/9/2001 5	Sepahan	1–0	Aboumoslem	Isfahan
				Stadium: Naghsh-e Jahan

12/17/2001 6	Sepahan	1–0	Paykan	Isfahan
				Stadium: Naghsh-e Jahan

12/27/2001 7	Malavan	0–0	Sepahan	Anzali

1/3/2002 8	Sepahan	3–0	Bargh	Isfahan
				Stadium: Naghsh-e Jahan

1/17/2002 9	PAS	0–0	Sepahan	Tehran

1/27/2002 10	Sepahan	0–1	Esteghlal	Isfahan
				Stadium: Naghsh-e Jahan

2/1/2002 11	Zob Ahan	0–2	Sepahan	Isfahan

2/15/2002 12	Sepahan	1–0	Est.Rasht	Isfahan
				Stadium: Naghsh-e Jahan

2/22/2002 13	Saipa	2–1	Sepahan	Karaj

3/8/2002 14	Fajr	0–1	Sepahan	Shiraz

3/12/2002 15	Sepahan	2–2	Foolad	Isfahan
				Stadium: Naghsh-e Jahan

3/17/2002 16	Persepolis	3–2	Sepahan	Tehran

4/15/2002 17	Sepahan	0–1	Tractor	Isfahan
				Stadium: Naghsh-e Jahan

4/21/2002 18	Aboumoslem	4–3	Sepahan	Mashhad

4/26/2002 19	Paykan	0–0	Sepahan	Tehran

4/30/2002 20	Sepahan	0–1	Malavan	Isfahan
				Stadium: Naghsh-e Jahan

5/5/2002 21	Bargh	0–0	Sepahan	Shiraz

5/10/2002 22	Sepahan	1–3	PAS	Isfahan
				Stadium: Naghsh-e Jahan

5/14/2002 23	Esteghlal	3–0	Sepahan	Tehran

5/19/2002 24	Sepahan	2–0	Zob Ahan	Isfahan
				Stadium: Naghsh-e Jahan

5/24/2002 25	Est.Rasht	1–1	Sepahan	Rasht

5/28/2002 26	Sepahan	0–0	Saipa	Isfahan
				Stadium: Naghsh-e Jahan

=== Hazfi Cup ===
==== Bracket ====
- Teams from the same city met only once.

Round of 16
Sepahan	1	1	2
Shahrdari Ahvaz	0	1	1
Est Rasht
Foolad	(w/o)
Shahrdari Mashhad	0	0	0
Zob Ahan	2	4	6
Esteghlal	4	-	4
PAS Tehran	2	-	2
Zob Felezat	0	0	1
Tractor Sazi	4	3	7
Fajr Sepasi	2	-	2
Bargh Shiraz	0	-	0
Paykan	1	1	2
Mes Kerman	0	2	2
Persepolis	1	2	3
Aboumoslem	1	2	3

Quarter-finals
Sepahan	0	2	2
Foolad	0	1	1
Zob Ahan	0	1	1
Esteghlal	0	3	3
Tractor Sazi	1	0	1
Fajr Sepasi	1	1	2
Paykan	1	-	1
Persepolis	0	-	0

Semi-finals
Sepahan	4	1	5
Esteghlal	2	3	5
Fajr Sepasi	1	0	1 (8)
Paykan	0	1	1 (7)

Final
Esteghlal	2	2	4
Fajr Sepasi	1	2	3

==== Matches ====
Win Draw Loss Postponed

Date Round	Home	Score	Away	Location

01/11/2002 1/8 Finals; First leg	Sepahan	2–1	Shahrdari Ahvaz	Isfahan
				Stadium: Naghsh-e Jahan

02/09/2002 1/8 Finals; Second leg	Shahrdari Ahvaz	1–1	Sepahan	Ahvaz

04/08/2002 Quarterfinals; First leg	Foolad	0–0	Sepahan	Ahvaz

06/02/2002 Quarterfinals; Second leg	Sepahan	2–1	Foolad	Isfahan
				Stadium: Naghsh-e Jahan

06/07/2002 Semi-finals; First leg	Sepahan	4–2	Esteghlal	Isfahan
	Stepanyan 17', 48' (pen.), 50'; Karimi 55'; Basirat (red card) 80'		77'Akbari; 64'Mousavi; (red card) 48'Khorramgah; (red card) 80'Bakhtiarizadeh	Stadium: Naghsh-e Jahan

06/11/2002 Semi-finals; Second leg	Esteghlal	3–1	Sepahan	Tehran
	Akbari 13' (pen.); Fatemi 78'; Momenzadeh 82'		90'Bezik
