= Mahmoud Fekri =

Iranian footballer and manager

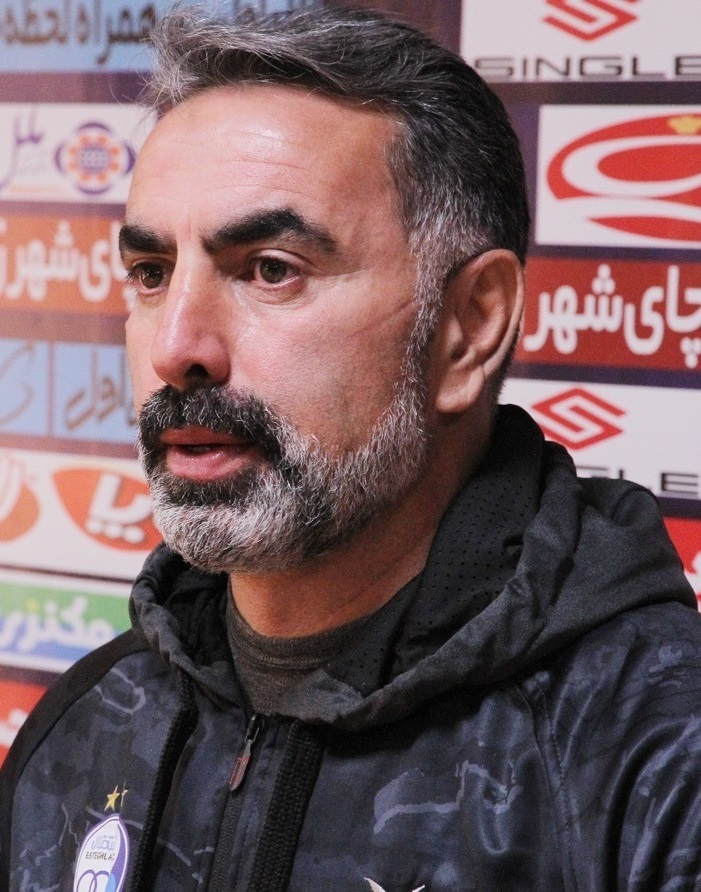
- Fekri in 2021

Personal information
- Full name: Mahmoud Fekri Juybari
- Date of birth: January 15, 1970 (age 56)
- Place of birth: Juybar, Iran
- Position: Defender

Team information
- Current team: Saipa

Senior career*
Years	Team	Apps	(Gls)
1991–1992	Nassaji Mazandaran		
1992–1996	Esteghlal		
1996–1998	Fajr Sepasi		
1998–2007	Esteghlal		
2007	Shirin Faraz		

International career
1998–2006	Iran	20	(1)

Managerial career
- 2007: Shirin Faraz
- 2009–2010: Shirin Faraz
- 2016: Nassaji Mazandaran
- 2017–2018: Naft Masjed Soleyman
- 2018–2019: Shahin Bushehr
- 2019: Sorkhpooshan
- 2019: Aluminium Arak
- 2019–2020: Khooshe Talaei
- 2020: Nassaji Mazandaran
- 2020–2021: Esteghlal
- 2021: Naft Masjed Soleyman
- 2022: Naft Masjed Soleyman
- 2022–2023: Saipa
- 2023: Havadar
- * Club domestic league appearances and goals

Mahmoud Fekri Juybari (born January 15,1970, in Juybar, Iran) is a former Iranian football player and coach who last coached Havadar in Iran Pro League. He was previously head coach of Shirin Faraz, Nassaji, Esteghlal and Saipa. He usually played the defender position.

As of 18 February 2022

== Club career and managerial career statistics ==
- Last Update: August 30, 2010

Club performance			League		Cup		Continental		Total	
Season	Club	League	Apps	Goals	Apps	Goals	Apps	Goals	Apps	Goals
Iran			League		Hazfi Cup		Asia		Total	
2001–02	Esteghlal	Persian Gulf Cup	24	0						
2002–03	Esteghlal	Persian Gulf Cup	19	0						
2003–04	Esteghlal	Persian Gulf Cup	22	1			-	-		
2004–05	Esteghlal	Persian Gulf Cup	28	1			-	-		
2005–06	Esteghlal	Persian Gulf Cup	26	0			-	-		
2006–07	Esteghlal	Persian Gulf Cup	19	0			-	-		
2007–08	Shirin Faraz	Persian Gulf Cup	4	0	1	0	-	-	5	0
Total	Iran		142	2						
Career total			142	2						

As of 18 February 2022

=== Managerial Statistics ===
Team	From	To	Record				
Team	From	To	G	W	D	L	Win %
Nassaji	July 2016	December 2016	15	5	6	4	33.33
Naft Masjed Soleyman	January 2017	June 2018	49	23	17	9	46.94
Shahin Bushehr	July 2018	January 2019	19	8	6	5	42.11
Sorkhpooshan Pakdasht	January 2019	March 2019	5	1	2	2	20.00
Aluminum Arak	June 2019	December 2019	17	6	8	3	35.29
Khooshe Talaei	December 2019	February 2020	8	5	1	2	62.50
Nassaji	February 2020	October 2020	10	4	6	0	40.00
Esteghlal	October 2020	March 2021	16	7	6	3	43.75
Naft Masjed Soleyman	April 2021	September 2021	11	3	2	6	27.27
Naft Masjed Soleyman	January 2022	March 2022	8	0	3	5	0.00
Saipa	July 2022	March 2023	20	9	7	4	45.00
Havadar	June 2023	December 2023	13	2	4	7	15.38

== International career ==
He was also a member of Iran national football team until November 15, 2006, when he officially retired from International football after a 2–0 victory against South Korea.

== Honours ==
=== Player ===
Esteghlal

- Iranian Football League (3): 1997–98, 2000–01, 2005–06
- Hazfi Cup (3): 1995–96, 1999–00, 2001–02
- Asian Club Championship runner-up : 1998-99
- Asian Club Championship third place : 2001-02

=== Manager ===
Naft Masjed Soleyman

- Azadegan League (1): 2017–18
