= Sattar Hamedani =

Iranian footballer

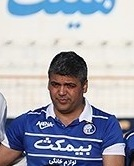
- Hamedani in 2018

Personal information
- Date of birth: June 7, 1974 (age 52)
- Place of birth: Malekan, Iran
- Height: 1.78 m (5 ft 10 in)
- Position: Midfielder

Senior career*
Years	Team	Apps	(Gls)
1995–1996	Tractor		
1996–1997	Keshavarz		
1997–1998	Payam Mashhad		
1998–1999	Bahman		
1999–2004	Esteghlal		
2004–2005	Saba Battery		
2005–2006	PAS Tehran		
2006–2007	Shirin Faraz		

International career^{‡}
1998–2001	Iran	40	(1)

Managerial career
- 2011–2012: Tractor (assistant)
- 2012–2015: Esteghlal (assistant)
- 2015–2016: Tractor (assistant)
- 2017–: Gostaresh (assistant)
Medal record
Representing Iran
Asian Games
Gold medal – first place	1998 Bangkok	Team competition
- * Club domestic league appearances and goals as of June 21, 2011 ‡ National team caps and goals as of October 9, 2026

Sattar Hamedani (Persian: ستار همدانی) born 7 June 1974) is an Iranian former professional footballer and manager. He played as a midfielder and represented several clubs, including Tractor, Esteghlal and PAS Tehran. During his time at Esteghlal, he won the Iranian league title in the 2000–01 season and the Hazfi Cup twice.

Hamdani represented the Iran national team from 1998 to 2001, participating in the 1998 FIFA World Cup and the 2000 AFC Asian Cup. He also helped Iran win the gold medal in football at the 1998 Asian Games. After retiring as a player, he moved into coaching and served as an assistant coach at clubs including Tractor and Esteghlal.

== Club career ==
Hamdani began his professional career in 1995 with Tractor. The following year, he moved to Keshavarz, where he spent one season, before joining Payam Mashhad in 1997. In 1998, he transferred to Bahman, where he played until the end of the 1998–99 season. After gaining experience at several clubs, he joined Esteghlal in 1999, marking a significant turning point in his playing career.

Hamdani enjoyed the peak of his playing career at Esteghlal. Operating in midfield, he became one of the club's key players. During his time at the club, Esteghlal won the Iranian league title in the 2000–01 season and the Hazfi Cup in the 1999–2000 and 2001–02 seasons. Hamdani remained with Esteghlal until 2004, sharing in several of the club's major achievements.

After leaving Esteghlal in 2004, Hamdani joined Saba Battery. Following one season with the club, he moved to PAS Tehran in 2005, where he continued playing until the end of the 2005–06 season. After leaving PAS Tehran, he joined Shirin Faraz in 2006. He spent his final season with the club, based in Kermanshah, before retiring from professional football in 2007.

== International career ==
Hamdani represented the Iran national team from the late 1990s. In 1998, he participated in the 1998 Asian Games in Thailand, helping Iran win the gold medal. He was also named in Iran's squad for the 1998 FIFA World Cup in France. However, he remained an unused substitute in all three of Iran's group-stage matches against Yugoslavia, the United States and Germany, and did not make an appearance in the tournament.

In 2000, he participated in the 2000 AFC Asian Cup. He started all three of Iran's group-stage matches against Lebanon, Thailand and Iraq, as Iran finished top of their group and advanced to the quarter-finals. However, they were eliminated after losing 2–1 to the South Korea national team.

Hamdani was also part of Iran's squad during the 2002 FIFA World Cup Asian qualifiers. He appeared in qualifying matches against Guam and Tajikistan in November 2000 and continued his international career thereafter.

He represented Iran from 1998 to 2001, making a total of 40 international appearances and scoring one goal.

== Honours ==
Esteghlal

- Iranian Football League: 2000–01
- Hazfi Cup: 1999–00, 2001–02

== Career statistics ==
=== International goals ===
#	Date	Venue	Opponent	Score	Result	Competition
1.	6 June 1999	Commonwealth Stadium, Edmonton, Canada	Guatemala	2–2	Draw	1999 Canada Cup
Correct as of 24 July 2021
