= Sohrab Bakhtiarizadeh =

Iranian football player and coach

Personal information
- Full name: Sohrab Bakhtiarizadeh
- Date of birth: 11 September 1973 (age 53)
- Place of birth: Ahvaz, Iran
- Height: 1.85 m (6 ft 1 in)
- Position: Centre-back

Team information
- Current team: Esteghlal (manager)

Youth career
- 1990–1992: Jonoub Ahvaz
- 1992–1994: Entezam Ahvaz
- 1994–1995: Shahin Ahvaz
- 1995–1997: Foolad

Senior career*
Years	Team	Apps	(Gls)
1997–1999	Foolad	30	(3)
1999–2000	Esteghlal	43	(1)
2000–2001	Erzurumspor	20	(1)
2001–2003	Esteghlal	37	(1)
2003–2004	Foolad	24	(4)
2004–2007	Saba Battery Tehran	74	(15)
2007	Pas Hamedan	1	(0)
2008–2009	Foolad	17	(1)
2009–2013	Saba Qom	60	(1)
2013–2014	Esteghlal Khuzestan	16	(1)

International career
1997–2006	Iran	33	(3)

Managerial career
- 2016: Naft M.I.S
- 2018–2019: Iran U23 (assistant)
- 2019–2020: Esteghlal Khuzestan
- 2020: Shahr Khodro
- 2020: Khosheh Talaei
- 2021–2022: Esteghlal Khuzestan
- 2023: Esteghlal (technical director)
- 2024: Sanat Naft
- 2024: Esteghlal (caretaker)
- 2024–2025: Esteghlal (assistant)
- 2025: Esteghlal (caretaker)
- 2026–: Esteghlal
- * Club domestic league appearances and goals

Sohrab Bakhtiarizadeh (Persian: سهراب بختيارى‌زاده; born 11 September 1973) is an Iranian football coach and former player who manages Persian Gulf Pro League club Esteghlal. As a player, he played as a centre-back and represented several clubs in Iran, including Esteghlal, Foolad and Saba Qom. He also represented the Iran national team and was part of the squad at the 2006 FIFA World Cup. After retiring from professional football, Bakhtiarizadeh moved into coaching and has worked with several clubs in Iranian football.

== Club career ==
He started his professional career with playing for Khuzestani clubs, before moving to Esteghlal FC. After a couple of seasons, he elected to play professionally in Turkish league. The move was far from successful and Sohrab left this club in controversial circumstances.

He returned to Esteghlal soon after. His lack of playing time caused him to be transferred to Foolad. After a season there he moved to Saba Battery. Along with the likes of Ali Daei and Mohammad Navazi, Sohrab won the Hazfi Cup in 2004/05 season and hence qualified for the Asian Champions League.

In August 2007, Bakhtiarzadeh was transferred to the newly formed club Pas Hamedan. He only played one match and had many differences with the club where he left the club and moved to Foolad for the season after and did not play in many matches. He moved to Saba for the season after.

Bakhtiarizadeh endured a major injury, and was out for many games during 2010–11 season.

== Personal life ==
On 7 January 2026, Bakhtiarizadeh publicly supported the 2025–2026 Iranian protests on his Instagram, stating: "This is the anger of a nation that saw before its eyes that your aghazadeh devoured the people's wealth. They took billions of their rights with a lot of force." On 9 February 2026, he publicly objected to being included on a list of supporters of the 1979 Islamic Revolution by the Ministry of Sport and Youth, ahead of the Revolution's anniversary.

== Club career statistics ==
As of 24 July 2013

Club performance			League		Cup		Continental		Total	
Season	Club	League	Apps	Goals	Apps	Goals	Apps	Goals	Apps	Goals
Turkey			League		Turkish Cup		Europe		Total	
2000–01	Erzurumspor	Süper Lig	20	1	0	0	–	–	20	1
Iran			League		Hazfi Cup		Asia		Total	
1999–00	Esteghlal	Azadegan League	15	0	0	0	–	–	15	0
2001–02	Esteghlal	Pro League	15	1	0	0	–	–	15	4
2002–03	Esteghlal	Pro League	19	0	0	0	3	0	19	0
2003–04	Foolad	Pro League	24	4	1	0	–	–	25	4
2004–05	Saba Battery	Pro League	25	3	2	0	–	–	27	3
2005–06	Saba Battery	Pro League	26	8	0	0	6	1	32	9
2006–07	Saba Battery	Pro League	23	4	5	0	–	–	28	4
2007–08	Pas	Pro League	1	0	0	0	–	–	1	0
2008–09	Foolad	Pro League	17	1	1	1	–	–	18	2
2009–10	Saba	Pro League	27	0	2	0	–	–	29	0
2010–11	Saba	Pro League	8	1	0	0	–	–	8	1
2011–12	Saba	Pro League	16	0	2	0	–	–	18	0
2012–13	Saba	Pro League	9	0	0	0	1	0	10	0
2013–14	Esteghlal Khuzestan	Pro League	16	1	0	0	–	–	16	1
Total	Turkey		20	1	0	0	–	–	20	1
Total	Iran		249	23	13	1	10	1	272	25
Career total			269	24	13	1	10	1	292	26

- Assist Goals

Season	Team	Assists
06–07	Saba Battery	3
10–11	Saba	0
11–12	Saba Qom	0

== International career ==
He made his debut for Iran in October 1997 in a World Cup 1998 qualification game against Qatar in Tehran. He was not included in Iran's final squad for the 1998 Fifa World Cup, but he was an on-and-off starter for the national team until 2003, when he lost his spot. He scored the last goal in the final of WAFF 2000 where Team Melli won the competition. His brilliant performance in the IPL 2005/06 season was rewarded by a recall to duty after a three-year absence from Team Melli. He appeared in two of Iran's games in the 2006 World Cup, starting against Angola and scoring Iran's only goal in the game. He was called up to the national team again after the World Cup, by new manager Amir Ghalenoei, but did not participate. He has since retired from international football and only participates in club play.

=== International goals ===
#	Date	Venue	Opponent	Score	Result	Competition
1.	2 June 2000	King Abdullah II Stadium, Amman, Jordan	Syria	1–0	1–0	2000 WAFF Championship
2.	24 November 2000	Takhti Stadium, Tabriz, Iran	Guam	8–0	19–0	2002 FIFA World Cup qualification
3.	24 November 2000	Takhti Stadium, Tabriz, Iran	Guam	14–0	19–0	2002 FIFA World Cup qualification
4.	21 June 2006	Zentralstadion, Leipzig, Germany	Angola	1–1	1–1	2006 FIFA World Cup
Correct as of 13 December 2017

== Managerial statistics ==
As of match played 7 November 2026.

Managerial record by team and tenure
Team	From	To	Record								
Team	From	To	M	W	D	L	GF	GA	GD	Win %	Ref.
Naft Masjed Soleyman	12 June 2016	22 December 2016	19	5	8	6	20	16	+4	26.32	
Esteghlal Khuzestan	15 October 2019	2 February 2020	13	4	4	5	10	8	+2	30.77	
Shahr Khodro	8 July 2020	29 August 2020	7	0	5	2	5	8	−3	0.00	
Khooshe Talaee	14 September 2020	16 December 2020	5	0	2	3	10	8	+2	0.00	
Esteghlal Khuzestan	15 September 2021	2 February 2022	17	7	5	5	19	13	+6	41.18	
Sanat Naft	3 February 2024	2 March 2024	7	0	2	5	8	14	−6	0.00	
Esteghlal (caretaker)	1 October 2024	23 October 2024	3	1	0	2	2	5	−3	33.33	
Esteghlal (caretaker)	28 January 2025	20 February 2025	5	3	2	0	7	2	+5	60.00	
Esteghlal	23 February 2026		16	9	6	1	22	9	+13	56.25	
Total			84	24	31	29	91	82	+9	28.57	

== Honours ==
=== Club ===
Esteghlal

- Hazfi Cup: 1999–2000, 2001–02

Saba

- Hazfi Cup: 2004–05
- Super Cup: 2005

=== National ===
Iran

- WAFF Championship: 2000
