= Hossein Khatibi =

Iranian footballer

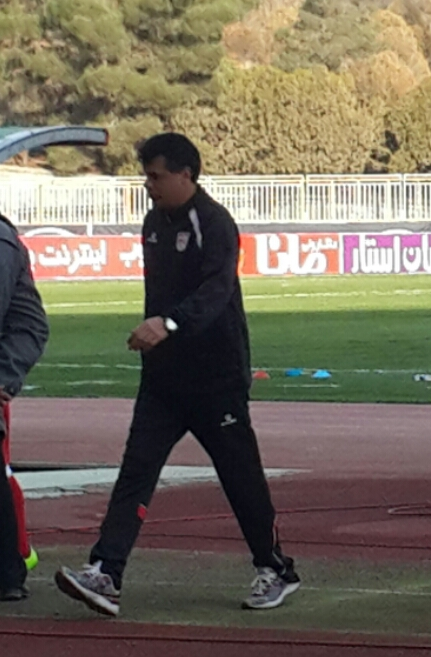
- Hossein Khatibi, Iranian coach

Personal information
- Date of birth: 5 January 1972 (age 54)
- Place of birth: Tabriz, Pahlavi Iran
- Position: Forward

Team information
- Current team: Navad Urmia (manager)

Youth career
- 1988–1990: Tractor

Senior career*
Years	Team	Apps	(Gls)
1989–1992	Tractor		
1992–1994	Shahrdari Tabriz		
1994–1995	Al-Nasr		
1995–1998	PAS		
1998–2002	Machine Sazi		

International career
1991	Iran U–23		
1997–1999	Iran	3	(1)

Managerial career
- 2008–2009: Gostaresh
- 2010: Gostaresh
- 2012: Machine Sazi
- 2014: Tractor (assistant)
- 2015: Siah Jamegan (assistant)
- 2015–2016: Machine Sazi (assistant)
- 2017–2018: Iranjavan Bushehr
- 2018: Machine Sazi
- 2020: Sardar Bukan
- 2021: Tractor (assistant)
- 2023: Ayandeh Sazan Ardabil
- 2025–: Navad Uramia
- * Club domestic league appearances and goals as of 15 June 2016

Hossein Khatibi (Persian: حسین خطیبی, born 5 January 1975 Tabriz, East Azerbaijan) is a retired Iranian football player and assistant manager of Persian Gulf Pro League in the Tabrizian teams such as Tractor, Shahrdari and Machine Sazi. He was the top goal-scorer in the 1997–98 Azadegan League for the Shahrdari football team. Iranian international footballer Rasoul Khatibi is his younger brother.
