= Ali Zarei =

Iranian protester sentenced to death

- علی زارعی دوزدره‌سی
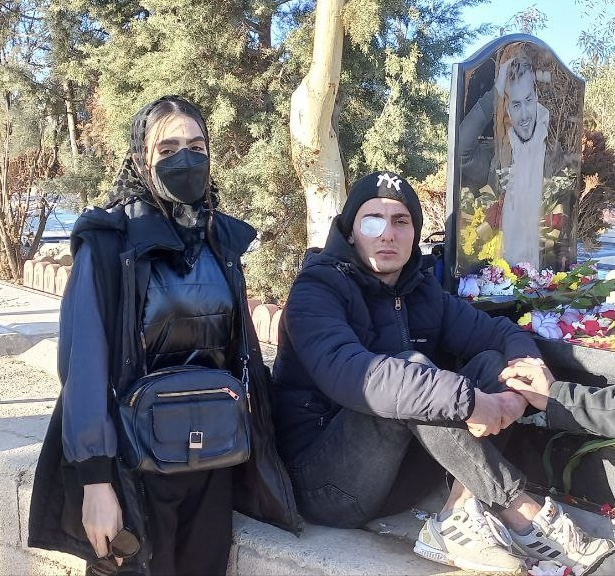
- Zarei with Kimia Zand
- Occupation: Laborer
- Known for: Eye injury during the 2022 Iranian protests and subsequent death sentence

Ali Zarei Doozdarrehsi (Persian: علی زارعی دوزدره‌سی) is an Iranian protester. He was seriously injured in his right eye during the 2022 Iranian protests. After returning to Iran from Germany in 2026, he was arrested by the Ministry of Intelligence. In August 2026, Branch 23 of the Tehran Revolutionary Court sentenced him to death on the charge of efsad-e fel-arz ("corruption on Earth").

== Background ==
Zare is originally from Ardabil and was living in Tehran's Nazi Abad neighbourhood during the 2022 protests. IranWire reported that he was 23 years old at the time and worked as a labourer in the Tehran Bazaar.

Reports published in September 2026 described him as approximately 27 years old.

== Eye injury during the 2022 protests ==
On 7 October 2022, Zarei was injured in the right eye during protests in Tehran. IranWire reported that he had been struck by pellet gunfire and later underwent medical treatment for the injury.

The injury caused severe loss of vision in his right eye. Later reports described him as having been blinded in one eye during the protests.

== Arrests and departure from Iran ==
Zarei was detained in Tehran on 19 June 2023 and released several hours later, according to IranWire.

Iran International reported that he was detained again in December 2023 while visiting the graves of protesters killed during the crackdown at Behesht-e Zahra cemetery in Tehran, and that he spent 33 days in solitary confinement in Evin Prison.

He later left Iran to Germany, where he received medical treatment and sought asylum. While in Germany, he appeared at a February 2026 rally in Munich held on the sidelines of the Munich Security Conference.

== Return to Iran and arrest ==
Zarei returned to Iran in 2026 because of unclear reasons. On 28 April 2026, Ministry of Intelligence agents arrested him after his return.

His case was initially investigated by Branch 3 of Tehran Prosecutor's Office District 33, commonly known as the Security Prosecutor's Office.

On 30 June 2026, he was transferred to Ghezel Hesar Prison in Karaj. At the time his death sentence was reported, he was being held in Unit 3, Ward 37 of the prison.

== Trial and death sentence ==
In August 2026, Branch 23 of the Tehran Revolutionary Court convicted Zarei of efsad-e fel-arz, commonly translated as "corruption on Earth", and sentenced him to death. According to HRANA, the sentence was communicated to him on 23 August 2026.

The allegations reported in connection with the case included extensive political activity, producing what authorities described as false reports, propaganda against the state, disruption of security, and unauthorized entry into and exit from Iran. These are allegations attributed to the judicial case and are not stated here as independently established facts.

IranWire reported that publicly available information did not provide details about the specific evidence presented for several of the charges, the conduct of the trial, or whether Zarei had access to a lawyer of his choice.

The death sentence received wider international coverage. Agence France-Presse reported on 3 September 2026 that Zarei, then 27, had been sentenced to death after having lost sight in one eye during the 2022 protests and later taking refuge in Germany.

As of early September 2026, reports stated that Zarei remained imprisoned at Ghezel Hesar Prison. No publicly reported execution date had been announced.

== See also ==
- 2022 Iranian protests
- Eye injuries during 2022 Iranian protests
- Human rights in the Islamic Republic of Iran
