= 2007–08 Hazfi Cup =

Tournament details
- Country: Iran

Final positions
- Champions: Esteghlal F.C.
- Runners-up: Damash

Tournament statistics
- Matches played: Champion asia 2009

The Hazfi Cup 2007–08 is the 21st staging of Iran's football knockout competition. A record 103 clubs' entries were accepted for the competition. The tournament began on October 15, 2007.

The cup winner were guaranteed a place in the 2009 AFC Champions League.

This tournament has been organised annually by the Football Federation Islamic Republic of Iran. Founded in 1975, the competition was not held during the 1980s.

== Format ==
The first stage of the competition (first three rounds) consists of:

- 24 clubs from the Azadegan League
- 28 clubs from the 2nd Division
- 29 clubs from the 3rd Division
- 4 clubs from Karaj, Kish, Tehran and its suburbs

The second stage of the competition (Round of 32 onward) consists of:

- 18 clubs from the Iran Pro League
- 16 clubs from the first stage of the competition

== First round ==
Matches were played between 15 and 19 October 2007.

Home team	Score	Away team
Naft Tehran	0–1	Shahrdari Bandar Abbas
Steel Azin	2–1	Shahrdari Shahr Ray
Sepidrood Rasht	2–0	Foolad Hormozgan
Persepolis Borazjan	(w/o)	Shahrdari Anzali
Nassaji Mazandaran	(w/o)	Kowsar Tehran
Persepolis Ghaemshahr	(w/o)	Dartak Khorramabad
Mashin Sazi	5–0	Parnia Malayer
West Azarbaijan	1–5	Nirou Moharekeh Qazvin
Fajr Mantaghe Do	5–2	Azad University Langarud
Sepahan Novin	1–2	Mes Sarcheshme
Sanaye Arak	3–1	Zoghalsang Kerman
Kaveh Zanjan	2–1	Sazan Rah Qom
Foolad	5–0	Moghavemat Tehran

== Second round ==
Matches were played between 21 and 23 October 2007.

Home team	Score	Away team
Nassaji Mazandaran	(w/o)	Hepco Arak
Moghavemat Shiraz	2–0	Persepolis Ghaemshahr
Tarbiat Hormozgan	0–4	Mes Sarcheshme
Shahrdari Anzali	2–1	Mashin Sazi
Deihim Ahvaz	1–3	Steel Azin
Fajr Mantaghe Do	0–1	Teraktor Sazi
Tarbiat Badani Yazd	13–1	Pas Birjand
Payam Mashhad	5–0	Moghavemat Vahdat Ghom
Gach Farsan	0–1	Shahrdari Yazd
Shahed Najafabad	3–0	Sepidrood Rasht
Shahrdari Tabriz	2–3	Nirou Moharekeh Qazvin
Foolad Yazd	7–0	Mashin Lent Semnan
Shahin Ahvaz	(w/o)	Zagros Yasooj
Ghahreman Khorasan Razavi	2–3	Shemushack Noshahr
Esteghlal Jonub	1–2	Mehrkam Pars Tehran
Lashgar Si Gorgan	0–1	Piroozi Yasouj
Petroshimi Tabriz	2–2	Shahrdari Bandar Abbas
Petroshimi progress 5–4 on penalties.

== Third round ==
Matches were played between 10 and 22 November 2007.

Home team	Score	Away team
Shahrdari Yazd	0–6	Foolad
Samand Tehran	2–0	Shahin Ahvaz
Sanaye Arak	4–0	Teraktor Sazi Novin
Steel Azin	1–1	Damash Iranian
Steel Azin progress 4–1 on penalties.
Nirou Moharekeh Qazvin	0–1	Kaveh Zanjan
Piroozi Yasouj	0–1	Shahin Bushehr
Teraktor Sazi	1–0	Shahed Najafabad
Moghavemat Shiraz	(w/o)	Aflak Lorestan
Tohid Kermanshah	1–2	Payam Mashhad
Mehrkam Pars Tehran	1–0	Shemushack Noshahr
Aboomoslem	1–1	Mes Kerman
Aboomoslem progress 4–2 on penalties.
Sanat Naft	2–3	Persepolis

== Bracket ==
1st Round
Persepolis	4
Petroshimi Tabriz	1
Pas Hamedan	4
Foolad Yazd	1
Esteghlal Ahvaz	3
Samand Tehran	0
Foolad	2
Saipa	1
Payam Mashhad	1 (6)
Rah Ahan	1 (7)
Shirin Faraz	1
Steel Azin	2
Esteghlal	5
Tarbiat Badani Yazd	3
Kaveh Zanjan	1
Zob Ahan	4
Bargh Shiraz	-
Nassaji Mazandaran	-
Paykan Tehran	2
Shahrdari Anzali	1
Shahin Bushehr	2
Malavan	0
Saba Battery	4
Teraktor Sazi	0
Moghavemat Sepasi	0 (5)
Moghavemat Shiraz	0 (3)
Sepahan	1
Mehrkam Pars Tehran	0
Aboomoslem	0
Sanaye Arak	1
Pegah Gilan	3
Mes Sarcheshmeh	0

2nd Round
Persepolis	0
PAS Hamedan	3
Esteghlal Ahvaz	4 (7)
Foolad	4 (8)
Rah Ahan	2 (5)
Steel Azin	2 (2)
Esteghlal	1 (3)
Zob Ahan	1 (1)
Bargh Shiraz	1
Paykan Tehran	0
Shahin Bushehr	2 (6)
Saba Battery	2 (5)
Moghavemat Sepasi	1
Sepahan	2
Sanaye Arak	0
Pegah Gilan	1

Quarterfinals
PAS Hamedan	0 (4)
Foolad	0 (5)
Rah Ahan	2 (3)
Esteghlal	2 (5)
Bargh Shiraz	2
Shahin Bushehr	0
Sepahan	2 (2)
Pegah Gilan	2 (4)

Semifinals
Foolad	1 (2)
Esteghlal	1 (4)
Bargh Shiraz	1
Pegah Gilan	2

Finals
Esteghlal	0 / 3 (agg. 3)
Pegah Gilan	1 / 0 (agg. 1)

== Round of 32 ==
Matches were played between 22 November 2007 and 18 February 2008.

Home team	Score	Away team
Esteghlal Ahvaz	3–0	Samand Tehran
Paykan Tehran	2–1 (a.e.t.)	Shahrdari Anzali
Saba Battery FC	4–0	Teraktor Sazi
Pegah Gilan	3–0	Mes Sarcheshmeh
Kaveh Zanjan	1–4 (a.e.t.)	Zob Ahan
Moghavemat Sepasi	0–0	Moghavemat Shiraz
Sepasi progress 5–3 on penalties.
Esteghlal	5–3	Tarbiat Badani Yazd
Foolad	2–1	Saipa
Payam Mashhad	1–1	Rah Ahan
Rah Ahan progress 7–6 on penalties.
Shirin Faraz	1–2	Steel Azin
Shahin Bushehr	2–0	Malavan
Bargh Shiraz	(w/o)	Nassaji Mazandaran
Pas Hamedan	4–1	Foolad Yazd
Persepolis	4–1	Petroshimi Tabriz
Sanaye Arak	1–0	Aboomoslem
Sepahan	1–0	Mehrkam Pars Tehran

== Round of 16 ==
Matches were played between 17 December 2007 and 4 March 2008.

Home team	Score	Away team
Foolad	4–4	Esteghlal Ahvaz
Foolad progress 8–7 on penalties.
Rah Ahan	2–2	Steel Azin
Rah Ahan progress 5–2 on penalties.
Zob Ahan	1–1	Esteghlal
Esteghlal progress 3–1 on penalties.
Bargh Shiraz	1–0	Paykan Tehran
Shahin Bushehr	2–2	Saba Battery
Shahin Bushehr progress 6–5 on penalties.
Pas Hamedan	3–0	Persepolis
Moghavemat Sepasi	1–2	Sepahan
Sanaye Arak	0–1	Pegah Gilan

== Quarter-finals ==
Matches were played between 26 February and 27 May 2008.

Home team	Score	Away team
Pas Hamedan	0–0	Foolad
Foolad progress 5–4 on penalties.
Bargh Shiraz	2–0	Shahin Bushehr
Esteghlal	2–2	Rah Ahan
Esteghlal progress 5–3 on penalties.
Pegah Gilan	4–2 (a.e.t.)	Sepahan

== Semi-finals ==
Matches were played between 29 May and 1 June 2008.

Home team	Score	Away team
Foolad	1–1	Esteghlal
Esteghlal progress 4–2 on penalties.
Pegah Gilan	2–1	Bargh Shiraz

== Final ==
Team 1	Agg.	Team 2	1st leg	2nd leg
Pegah Gilan	1–3 (a.e.t.)	Esteghlal	1–0	0–3

=== Leg 1 ===
9 June 2008
17:30

Pegah Gilan	1–0	Esteghlal
Gilauri 40'

Sardar Jangal Stadium, Rasht
Attendance: 20,000
Referee: Mozafarizadeh

=== Leg 2 ===
16 June 2008
17:00

Esteghlal	3–0 (a.e.t.)	Pegah Gilan
Amirabadi 15'; Jabari 95'; Borhani 99'

Azadi Stadium, Tehran
Attendance: 100,000
Referee: Hedayat Mombeini
