= Dariush Yazdani =

Iranian former footballer (born 1977)

Personal information
- Full name: Dariush Yazdani
- Date of birth: June 2, 1977 (age 49)
- Place of birth: Shiraz, Iran
- Height: 1.76 m (5 ft 9 in)
- Position: Midfielder

Youth career
- 1990–1994: Mersad Shiraz

Senior career*
Years	Team	Apps	(Gls)
1994–1996	Bargh Shiraz	23	(10)
1996–1997	Payam Mashhad	12	(2)
1997–1998	Esteghlal	20	(1)
1998–1999	Bayer Leverkusen II	4	(0)
1998–1999	Bayer Leverkusen	0	(0)
1999–2000	Esteghlal	25	(4)
2000–2003	Charleroi	73	(7)
2003–2005	Pegah Gilan	28	(3)
2005–2007	Saipa	37	(4)
2007–2008	Paykan	29	(2)
2008	Bargh Shiraz	15	(0)
2008–2009	Emirates Club	5	(0)
2009–2011	Saipa	34	(0)
2012–2013	Los Angeles Blues	4	(0)

International career
1996–2002	Iran	25	(1)

Managerial career
- 2013–2014: Los Angeles Blues
- 2017: PSPS Pekanbaru
- * Club domestic league appearances and goals

Dariush Yazdani (Persian: داریوش یزدانی; born June 2, 1977) is an Iranian former footballer who played as a midfielder.

== Personal life ==
On 25 January 2026, Yazdani public supported the 2025–2026 Iranian protests on his Instagram, stating: "From the perspective of the Iranian people, the Islamic government must step down, and everyone wants the return of Mr. Pahlavi as a symbol of a different future."

== Career statistics ==
=== Club ===
As of 11 April 2018

Club performance			League		Cup		Continental		Total	
Season	Club	League	Apps	Goals	Apps	Goals	Apps	Goals	Apps	Goals
Germany			League		DFB-Pokal		LIGAPOKAL		Total	
1998–99	Bayer Leverkusen	Bundesliga	0	0	0	0	1	0	1	0
1998–99	Bayer 04 Leverkusen II	Regionalliga	4	0	0	0	0	0	4	0
Iran			League		Hazfi Cup		Asia		Total	
1999–00	Esteghlal	Azadegan League	25	4					25	4
Belgium			League		Belgian Cup		Europe		Total	
2000–01	Charleroi	Belgian First Division	18	2	0	0	-	-	18	2
2001–02	Charleroi	Belgian First Division	32	3	1	0	-	-	33	3
2002–03	Charleroi	Belgian First Division	22	2	1	0	-	-	23	2
2003–04	Charleroi	Belgian First Division	1	0	0	0	-	-	1	0
Iran			League		Hazfi Cup		Asia		Total	
2003–04	Pegah	Pro League	4	0			-	-	4	0
2004–05	Pegah	Pro League	24	3			-	-	24	3
2005–06	Saipa	Pro League	10	1			-	-	10	1
2006–07	Saipa	Pro League	27	3			-	-	27	3
2007–08	Paykan	Pro League	29	2	1	0	-	-	30	2
2008–09	Bargh	Pro League	15	0			-	-	15	0
United Arab Emirates			League		President's Cup		Asia		Total	
2008–09	Emirates	UAE League	5	0			-	-	5	0
Iran			League		Hazfi Cup		Asia		Total	
2009–10	Saipa	Persian Gulf Cup	30	0	0	0	-	-	30	0
2010–11	Saipa	Persian Gulf Cup	4	0	0	0	-	-	4	0
2012	Orange County	United Soccer League	2	0	0	0	-	-	2	0
2013	Orange County	United Soccer League	2	0	0	0	-	-	2	0
Total	Germany		4	0	0	0	1	0	5	0
Total	Iran		168	13						
Total	Belgium		73	7	2	0	–	–	75	7
Total	United Arab Emirates		5	0			–	–	5	0
Total	United States		4	0	0	0	–	–	4	0
Career total			254	20	3	0	1	0	258	20

== Honors ==
Bargh Shiraz

- Hazfi Cup: 1996–97

Esteghlal

- Iranian Football League: 1997–98
- Hazfi Cup: 1997–98

Bayer Leverkusen

- Bundesliga runner-up: 1999–2000
- DFB-Pokal runner-up: 1999–2000

Saipa

- Iranian League: 2006–07

Iran

- Asian Games: 1998
- AFC Asian Cup bronze medal: 1996
