= 1999–2000 Hazfi Cup =

Tournament details
- Country: Iran

Final positions
- Champions: Esteghlal
- Runners-up: Bahman

The 1999–2000 Hazfi Cup was the 13th season of this annual Iranian football knockout competition. The tournament is organised by the Football Federation Islamic Republic of Iran. Teams from Tehran or Tehran province play each other only once.

== Round of 16 ==
=== Single-legged ties ===
Teams from Tehran or Tehran province play each other only once

April 2000

Esteghlal	2–1 (a.s.d.e.t.)	Keshavaraz
Dadashzadeh 69'; Hamedani 111'		Pashaee 73'

== Quarterfinals ==
=== Single-legged ties ===
Teams from Tehran or Tehran province play each other only once

April 20, 2000

Saipa	1–0 (a.s.d.e.t.)	PAS
Rasouli 119'

May 16, 2000

Bahman	2–1	Electric Damavand
Mikayili 58'; Rasti 63'		Mofarrah 46'

=== Two-legged ties ===
April 20, 2000

Sepahan	0–1	Chooka Talesh
		Taghizadeh 89'

May 16, 2000

Chooka Talesh	0–1 (a.e.t.)	Sepahan
		Dehghani 21'
Penalties
	4–5

May 16, 2000

IrSotter Noshahr	1–1	Esteghlal
Ramezani 16'		Tahmasebi 1'

May 26, 2000

Esteghlal	6–0	IrSotter Noshahr
Nikbakht 19'; Yazdani 23', 49', 85', 90+1'; Nashta'ali 29' (o.g.)

== Semifinals ==
=== Single-legged ties ===
Teams from Tehran or Tehran province play each other only once

May 31, 2000

Saipa	1–2	Esteghlal
Taghavi 50'		Yazdani 36', 78'

Azadi Stadium, Tehran

=== Two-legged ties ===
May 26, 2000

Sepahan	2–2	Bahman
Nouri 52'; Veysi 90+4' (pen.)		Hardani 30'; Sharifi 86'

May 31, 2000

Bahman	2–1	Sepahan
Majidi 27', 90+2'		Veysi 65'

== Final ==
June 15, 2000

Esteghlal	3–1	Bahman
Navazi 45', 57'; Latifi 82'		Jabbari 90'

Azadi Stadium, Tehran
