= Ali Latifi =

Iranian footballer and manager

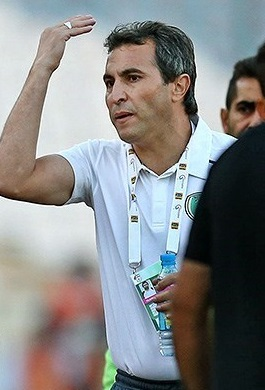
- Latifi in 2014

Personal information
- Full name: Ali Latifi
- Date of birth: February 20, 1976 (age 50)
- Place of birth: Tehran
- Height: 1.85 m (6 ft 1 in)
- Position: Centre forward

Youth career
- 1990–1992: Esteghlal
- 1992–1994: Bahman
1998–2001	Esteghlal F.C.		(21)
2001–2002	Pas Tehran		(9)
2002–2003	Admira Wacker		(3)
2003–2004	Paykan		(5)
2004–2005	Aboumoslem		(2)
2005–2006	Sorkhpooshan		(7)
2006-2007	Paykan		(3)

International career
Years	Team	Apps	(Gls)
1998	Iran	3	(0)

Managerial career
- 2008-2009: Esteghlal
- 2009-2010: Esteghlal U23
- 2013–2014: Rah Ahan (Assistant)
- 2013–2014: Rah Ahan
- 2015–2016: Oxin Alborz
- 2016–2017: Oxin Alborz (Technical Manager)
- 2016–2017: PAS Hamedan
- 2017–2018: Oxin Alborz
- 2018–2019: Malavan
- 2020–: Oxin Alborz

Ali Latifi (Persian: علی لطیفی, born February 20, 1976) is an Iranian former professional footballer and football manager. He played as a forward and represented several Iranian clubs, including Esteghlal and Paykan. He was also a member of the Iran national team at the 1998 FIFA World Cup. Following his retirement as a player, he became a manager and coached several clubs in Iran.

== Club career ==
Latifi played for the youth team of Esteghlal from 1990 to 1992 before joining the youth team of Bahman and subsequently progressing to its senior team. He played for Bahman from 1994 to 1998, attracting attention in Iranian football. Several clubs showed interest in signing him, and Esteghlal made attempts to recruit him over a period of three to four seasons. However, Bahman refused to allow his departure, and Latifi developed into one of Iran's most promising young forwards at the time.

Latifi joined Esteghlal in 1998 and played for the club for approximately two to three seasons. He cited his affection for Esteghlal as an important factor in his decision to join the club. Although he also received an offer from Persepolis, he decided to play for Esteghlal instead. He also temporarily represented Persepolis in a West Asian competition at the club's request, where he won the tournament.

He subsequently played for PAS Tehran before moving to Austria in 2001 to join Admira Wacker. Former Austrian footballer and coach Heinz Frank reportedly became interested in signing him after watching footage of his performances. Latifi signed a contract with Admira Wacker, marking his move to European football, and competed in the Austrian Bundesliga during the 2001–02 season.

However, his time in Austria was hampered by injuries. Shortly after his arrival, he suffered an injury that kept him out of action for approximately four months. Following his return, he was selected for the Austrian league's Team of the Week on four occasions. He subsequently suffered an ankle fracture that forced him to miss another extended period, eventually leading to the termination of his contract and his return to Iran.

After returning to Iran, Latifi played for Paykan and Aboumoslem, among other clubs. He later joined Sorkhpooshan Delvar Afzar before returning to Paykan. He retired from professional football in 2007.

== International career ==
Latifi was called up to the Iran national team in 1998. He made his international debut on 14 April 1998 in a friendly match against Kuwait. He subsequently appeared in matches against Hungary on 20 April and Jamaica on 22 April.

In the same year, he was included in Iran's squad for the 1998 FIFA World Cup, held in France, and was assigned the number 13 shirt. Iran lost 1–0 to Yugoslavia in their opening group match but defeated the United States 2–1 to secure their first-ever victory in the FIFA World Cup. In their final group match, Iran lost 2–0 to Germany and were eliminated from the tournament. Latifi did not make an appearance in any of Iran's three matches.

== Personal life ==
On 7 January 2026, Latifi publicly supported the 2025–2026 Iranian protests on his Instagram, stating: "You came to the people of Iran with a seven-toman dollar and the promise of paradise, and through embezzlement, discrimination, rent, and inequality, you turned rich Iran into a poor country."

== Honours ==
=== Playing career ===
Club	Season	Goals
Bahman	1993-97	52
Perspolis	1997-98	-
Esteghlal	1998-2001	21
PAS Tehran	2001-02	9
Admira Wacker	2002-03	0
Paykan	2003-04	5
Aboumoslem	2004-05	2
Sorkhpooshan	2005-06	7
Paykan	2006-07	3

=== Managerial career ===
Club	Season	Role	League
Esteghlal	2008-09	Manager	Persian Gulf Pro League
Esteghlal ^{U23}	2009-10	Manager	-
Rah Ahan	2013-14	Assistant	Persian Gulf Pro League
Rah Ahan	2013-14	Manager	Persian Gulf Pro League
Oxin Alborz	2015-16	Manager	Azadegan League
Oxin Alborz	2016-17	Technical Manager	Azadegan League
PAS Hamedan	2016-17	Manager	Azadegan League
Oxin Alborz	2017-18	Manager	Azadegan League
Malavan	2019-20	Manager	Azadegan League
