= 1997–98 Azadegan League =

7th season of Azadegan League

Azadegan League
- Season: 1997–98
- Champions: Esteghlal
- Relegated: Bahman, Esteghlal Ahvaz, Payam Mashhad, Bargh Shiraz
- Asian Club Championship: Esteghlal
- Asian Cup Winners' Cup: Pas Tehran
- Matches: 210
- Top goalscorer: Hossein Khatibi 16 (Shahrdari Tabriz)

The 1997–98 Azadegan League was the seventh season of the Azadegan League that was won by Esteghlal. The following is the final results of the Azadegan League's 1997–98 football season.

== Final classification ==
Pos	Team	Pld	W	D	L	GF	GA	GD	Pts	Qualification or relegation
1	Esteghlal (C)	28	16	10	2	46	21	+25	58	Qualification for the 1998–99 Asian Club Championship
2	PAS	28	13	13	2	33	20	+13	52	Qualification for the 1998–99 Asian Cup Winners' Cup
3	Zob Ahan	28	11	12	5	31	20	+11	45	
4	Fajr Sepasi	28	10	10	8	37	27	+10	40	
5	Sh. Tabriz	28	10	9	9	37	29	+8	39	
6	Sepahan	28	9	10	9	24	25	−1	37	
7	Saipa	28	7	14	7	26	26	0	35	
8	Polyacryl	28	8	11	9	28	29	−1	35	
9	Tractor Sazi	28	9	8	11	33	38	−5	35	
10	Foolad	28	10	5	13	29	45	−16	35	
11	Sanat Naft	28	8	10	10	30	30	0	34	
12	Bahman (R)	28	7	11	10	31	34	−3	32	Relegation to the 1998–99 Iran 2nd Division
13	Esteghlal Ahvaz (R)	28	6	12	10	31	41	−10	30	Relegation to the 1998–99 Iran 2nd Division
14	Payam Mashhad (R)	28	5	11	12	24	35	−11	26	Relegation to the 1998–99 Iran 2nd Division
15	Bargh Shiraz (R)	28	3	10	15	19	39	−20	19	Relegation to the 1998–99 Iran 2nd Division
16	Persepolis (W)	0	0	0	0	0	0	0	0	Withdrew

Updated to match(es) played on 1 September 2018. Source: RSSSF
Rules for classification: 1) Points; 2) Goal difference; 3) Goals scored.
Note: Persepolis withdrew due to international commitments of the players. before withdrew Persepolis had 5 wins 2 draws and 1 loss.
(C) Champions; (R) Relegated; (W) ?

== Summary ==
- Iranian football champions: Esteghlal
- Relegated: Bahman, Esteghlal Ahvaz, Payam Khorasan, Bargh Shiraz
- Promoted: Aboomoslem, Chooka Talesh, Malavan, Bank Melli

== Player statistics ==
=== Top goalscorers ===
16

- Hossein Khatibi (Shahrdari Tabriz)
