= Esteghlal F.C. =

Iranian football club in Tehran

Esteghlal
- Full name: Esteghlal Football Club
- Nicknames: Capital Blues; Blue Boys; Tâj; SS; 2 Stars; Asia Blues; Giant of Asia; The Boss
- Founded: 26 September 1945; 81 years ago as Docharkheh Savaran Football Club
- Ground: Azadi Stadium
- Capacity: 78,116
- Owners: Consortium of Persian Gulf Petrochemical Industries Group and its subsidiaries: PGPIC — 5%; PPC — 20%; BSPC — 20%; BIPC — 20%; STPC — 20%
- President: Mostafa Motedayyen
- Head Coach: Sohrab Bakhtiarizadeh
- League: Persian Gulf Pro League
- 2025–26: Persian Gulf Pro League, 1st after 22 matches (season unfinished)
- Website: fcesteghlal.ir
Home colours	Away colours

Esteghlal Football Club (Persian: باشگاه فوتبال استقلال, romanized: Bâšgâh-e Futbâl-e Esteqlâl) is an Iranian professional football club based in Tehran that competes in the Persian Gulf Pro League. The club was founded in 1945 as The Cyclists (دوچرخه‌سواران, Dočarkhe-Savârân) and was known as Tâj (تاج; meaning 'The Crown') between 1949 and 1979. The club is part of the multisport club Esteghlal Athletic and Cultural Company of Iran. They were the first team to reach 1,000 points in the Persian Gulf Pro League. Esteghlal has won 39 official championship titles in provincial, national and continental cups, making them one of Iran's most decorated clubs.

After the 1979 revolution, the club's women's teams were dissolved and the progress of women's football in Iran was tied to new regime politics. Since the 1973–74 season, Esteghlal has played its home games at the Azadi, which has a seating capacity of 78,116, though it can hold more people during important matches.

== History ==
=== 1945–69: early years, The Crown ===
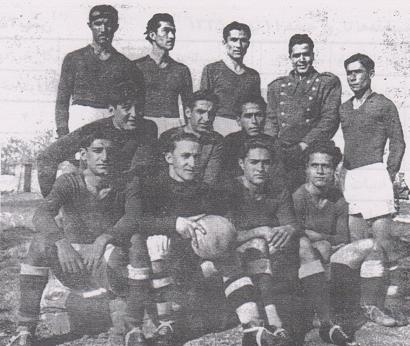
Docharkheh Savaran (Taj) Team in 1946

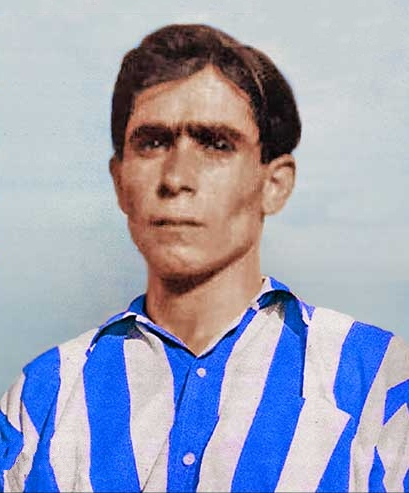
Ali Danaeifard, club player and manager from 1946 until 1969

On 20 September 1945, some young athletes and students including a 23-year-old military officer Parviz Khosravani (first manager of the club), Asghar Navaab (Bicycle Mechanic), Enayat Jananpour (National Sports Organisation staff member), Mirzaee (carpenter) and Khashaaei (bank guard) established a sports club on Ferdowsi Street, Tehran. Since the founders of the club were mostly interested in cycling, the club's original name was Docharkheh Savaran (Persian: دوچرخه سواران; meaning 'The Cyclists'), in 1945. Esteghlal football club played its first official match in 1946.

In the first year, the 1946 season, they stood in second place of Tehran Football League and Tehran Hazfi Cup. The 1947 season ended with the first ever Esteghlal's cup, after victories to reach the Tehran Hazfi Cup. Docharkhe Savaran founders and players agreed with the rename of the club to Taj (تاج; meaning 'The Crown'), in 1949.

From the beginning Taj or Docharkeh Savaran competed in the Tehran Local League, which at the time was the highest ranked league in Iran. On 6 March 1950, Taj played its first official game in Amjadieh Stadium against Shahin; Taj managed a 1–0 win.

Taj won seven first titles in the 1950s and 1960s; 1949–1950, 1951–1952, 1957–1958 and the three consecutive championships in 1959–1960, 1960–1961 and 1961–1962 (in the following years Taj added its first titles from the Tehran Provincial League and the Tehran Hazfi Cup) and again in 1963–1964 season.

Taj also won four Tehran Hazfi Cup in 1947, 1951, 1958 and 1959. The most successful club in Iran between that years, so far than other great teams like Daraei with three first titles and Shahin with two first titles and four-second place. The first national cup was obtained in 1957 National Football League after victory against Tabriz team by three goals. Taj represented Tehran's football in those games which were played in Bagh-e-Homayun ground.

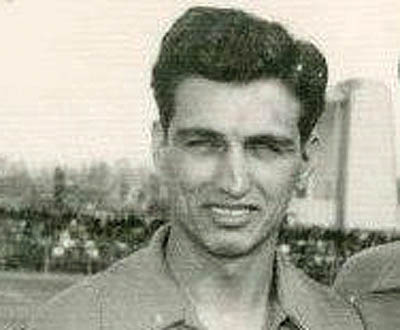
Büyük Jeddikar is known for being the first footballer in Iranian football history to be transferred from an Iranian club TAJ (Esteghlal) to a foreign club in 1957.

Tehran old derby was a sensitive match which played between TAJ and Shahin in mid century, until 1967.

=== 1970–78: champion of Asia and Iran ===
The 1970 Asian Club Championship was the 3rd edition of the annual Asian club football competition hosted by Asian Football Confederation. Seven clubs from seven countries competed in the tournament. The tournament was held in Tehran, Iran in April. The clubs were split in two groups and the group winners and runners-up advanced to semi-finals.

TAJ defeated Hapoel Tel Aviv of Israel 2–1 in the final to win its first ever Asian Club Championship and started new era in Iranian football with announced of professionalisation of football in Iran.Club Legend Ali Jabbari(King Ali) was the Star and Captain of the Team.

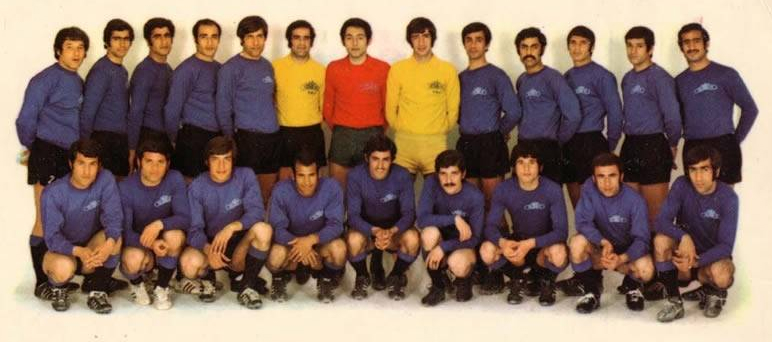
TAJ squad in 1970 as national and continental champions

This year had another honour for TAJ, the first Iranian national league title: 1970–71 Local League under management of Rajkov. TAJ defeated PAS 2–1 in final match. TAJ have reached to third place in the 1971 Asian Club Championship, a year after the first Asian Cup of club. They were defeated ROK Army of Korea 3–2 in Third place match.

TAJ stood at second place in the 1973–74 league, with only two points less than Persepolis. Gholam Hossein Mazloumi was the top scorer of the league, with 15 goals. TAJ reached the 1974–75 Takht Jamshid Cup the next year, the second official Iranian Football League for Club. Mazloumi was still the best scorer. Social tensions came to the club, a rebellion against the system which named revolution in next years.

=== 1979–2001: revolution and post-revolution ===
After the 1979 Islamic Revolution in Iran, the club was taken over by the newly established Islamic government and put under the control of the Physical Education Organization of the Islamic republic of Iran (Persian: سازمان تربیت بدنی جمهوری اسلامی ايران), a governmental organisation, and changed its name to Esteghlal (Persian: استقلال), 'Independence' in Persian; Taj (تاج) means 'Crown' in Persian.

During the 1980s, Esteghlal won the Tehran Football League twice. The 1989–90 season was a memorable one for Esteghlal. The club finished 1st in Group B of the Qods League and advanced to the semi-finals. Esteghlal defeated Malavan 4–0 on aggregate to advance to the final against the rival: Persepolis. Esteghlal defeated Persepolis 2–1 to win the Qods League. In the following season, Esteghlal made it to the final of the Hazfi Cup only to lose to Malavan on penalties.

1990–91 Esteghlal won the Asian Club Championship for the 2nd time defeating Chinese club Liaoning 2–1. In the next year Esteghlal reached the 1991 Asian Club Championship final match again and lost in penalties to Al-Hilal FC. Esteghlal once again reached the final of the Asian Club Championship in 1999, this time losing to Japanese club Júbilo Iwata 1–2 in Tehran.

=== 2001–present: Iran Pro League Era ===
2001 marked the first year of the newly founded Iran Pro League. Going into the final day, Esteghlal was on top of the league's table; however, with an Esteghlal loss and a Persepolis win, Persepolis was crowned as the league's inaugural champion. However, the 2001–02 Hazfi Cup provided some consolation for Esteghlal as they beat Fajr Sepasi 4–3 on aggregate to win the cup. The 2002–03 season was one of the worst years in club history, as they finished 9th and were eliminated in the group stage of the AFC Champions League.

In July 2003, Amir Ghalenoi was appointed manager of Esteghlal. In his first year, Esteghlal finished runner-up in the league behind the champion Pas Tehran. Ghalenoi also made it to the final of the Hazfi Cup losing 2–5 on aggregate to Sepahan. His second season proved to be less successful as Esteghlal finished 3rd and failed to qualify to the AFC Champions League. However, the 2005–06 season Esteghlal were crowned champions of the Iran Pro League for the first time in the Pro League era.

In 2006 after the departure of Amir Ghalenoi, his assistant and youth team coach Samad Marfavi took over the head-coaching job. Esteghlal had a disappointing season, finishing fourth, thus failing to secure a spot in the AFC Champions League, as well as only reaching the Round of 16 in the Hazfi Cup with a shock defeat by Fajr Sepasi. After Marfavi's departure in August 2007, Nasser Hejazi took over; but after only 14 games and 4 defeats, Hejazi was fired as manager in November 2007. Firouz Karimi was hired as the temporary head coach for the remainder of the season; he did not fare much better than Hejazi and the team finished 13th in the league, its lowest finish ever. Firouz Karimi was fired in May 2008 and Amir Ghalenoi was hired again in July 2008. He regrouped the team and the Hazfi Cup proved to be a valuable consolation, as Esteghlal became champions after defeating Pegah Gilan 3–1 on aggregate, thus securing a Champions League spot after a two-year absence. During Ghalenoi's first full and only season in his second stint with Esteghlal, he led the team to an Iran Pro League championship, finishing ahead of Zob Ahan on goal difference. However, after a group stage exit in the AFC Champions League, Ghalenoi resigned.

Samad Marfavi took the reins of Esteghlal for a second time; Marfavi led the team to a 3rd place league finish in the 2009–10 season and also led the team to the Round of 16 of the AFC Champions League, losing to Al Shabab of Saudi Arabia 2–3 on aggregate. In the spring of 2010, Marfavi extended his contract for another year, but strangely a few days later he resigned. This time Esteghlal turned to Parviz Mazloumi, a former Esteghlal player in the 1980s. During his 2-year tenure with Esteghlal, he led the team to 2nd and 3rd place league finishes, as well as a Hazfi Cup trophy in 2012. After a 0–2 loss to fellow countrymen Sepahan in the Round 16 of the AFC Champions League, Mazloumi was sacked by the club and Amir Ghalenoi took the reins of Esteghlal for a third time.

The new era started for Esteghlal. Ghalenoi had no trouble leading Esteghlal to a league victory in his first season back. The team also made it to the semi-finals of the Hazfi Cup which they eventually lost to Sepahan. The year was also marked by advancing to the AFC Champions League semi-finals where they met Korean side FC Seoul. After a 0–2 away loss in the first leg, Esteghlal faced an uphill task; they returned to Azadi Stadium but eventually lost to FC Seoul 2–4 on aggregate.

The next season however was a disappointing one for Ghalenoi and his team. With a chance to win the league on the final match day, Esteghlal lost 1–3 to Tractor Sazi and dropped to 5th place, and out of a champions league slot. Esteghlal also faced a shock defeat at the hands of Mes Kerman in the Hazfi Cup semi-finals. To top off Esteghlal's horrendous year, the team failed to reach the AFC Champions League knock-out stage, finishing 3rd in its group.

After Esteghlal's defeat to Zob Ahan in the Hazfi Cup final on 29 May 2016, Parviz Mazloomi was fired and replaced by former player and Naft Tehran's head coach Alireza Mansourian on 1 June 2016. Esteghlal started the season poorly and were knocked out of the Hazfi Cup in the Quarter-finals by Naft Tehran. The club was also issued a transfer ban for the 2017 winter period for outstanding debts to Adil Chihi. On 7 February 2017, Esteghlal defeated Qatari club Al Sadd on penalties to advance to the 2017 AFC Champions League group stage. Esteghlal was defeated by Al Ain 6–1 on quarter final of 2017 AFC Champions League and was eliminated. Mansourian was the head coach of Esteghlal until 7th week of 2017–18 season of Persian Gulf Pro League. Mansourian resigned after accumulating only 5 points in 7 matches and standing on 16th position. German coach Winfried Schäfer was appointed as new manager of Esteghlal Tehran on 1 October 2017, replacing Alireza Mansourian. He was fired in the spring of 2019 and Farhad Majidi replaced him, but was fired at the end of the season.

In June 2019, Italian coach Andrea Stramaccioni was appointed as Esteghlal's coach, but he later left the club in December 2019 due to financial insolvency.

In 2022 women attended an Iranian domestic league football match in the Azadi Stadium for the first time since the 1979 Islamic revolution.

== Crest and symbols and estate ==
Unveiled in 1946, Docharkhehsavaran's first crest featured a blue cyclist cycling. In 1950 following change of club's name the crest changed to two interlocking rings on both sides of Pahlavi crown.

Before the revolution, the Taj sports complex had 5 sports clubs in Tehran and 66 clubs in the cities. Taj also had clubs in Turkey (under the name of Tajspor club) and Qatar. Taj clubs in Tehran include Taj Central Palace on Baharestan Street, Pele Sports Club on Nizam Abad Street, Taj Women's Club on Los Angeles Street (now Hijab), Taj Tennis Club on Pahlavi Street (now Veli Asr) and Reza Pahlavi club was in Naziabad. Taj also had two sports stores in Tehran on Shahreza and Baharestan streets. With the Iranian revolution and on 28 February, the Taj Central Palace and other places belonging to the Taj Club were taken over by the Revolutionary Committees.

The sports facilities were given to the Physical Training Organization and the administrative facilities or other services such as the sports store of the club were handed over to organizations such as the Islamic Propaganda Organization. Esteghlal Club's efforts to reclaim these places have not been successful so far.

== Colours ==
Esteghlal wore blue shirts from the beginning with white or blue shorts and socks. The second colour of the club is white.

=== Historical kits ===
Historical kits of Esteghlal
1945; The First Kit (was founded in 1945)	1970; 1st Asian Championship title	1991; 2nd Asian Championship title

== Rivalries ==
=== Tehran derby ===
The club's biggest rival and its opponent in the Tehran derby is Persepolis. The first derby match between the clubs took place on 5 April 1968, at Amjadieh Stadium.

In 1995, IRIFF began to invite foreign referees to officiate the derby to ease fans' and players' suspicions of referee bias. This occurred after the events of the 38th derby (20 January 1995) in which Persepolis was leading by a score of 2–0 until the 79th minute when Esteghlal scored two goals within 8 minutes to erase the deficit; the 1st goal was scored from the penalty spot which angered the Persepolis fans and players who felt the referee was biased towards Esteghlal. Persepolis fans stormed the field in the 88th minute and fights broke out on the pitch between fans and players. Following the match, it was decided that Iranian referees would no longer be used for the derby. After 14 years of foreign referees, the second leg of the 2008–09 season saw an Iranian once again refereeing the derby. The game ended in a draw.

== Supporters ==
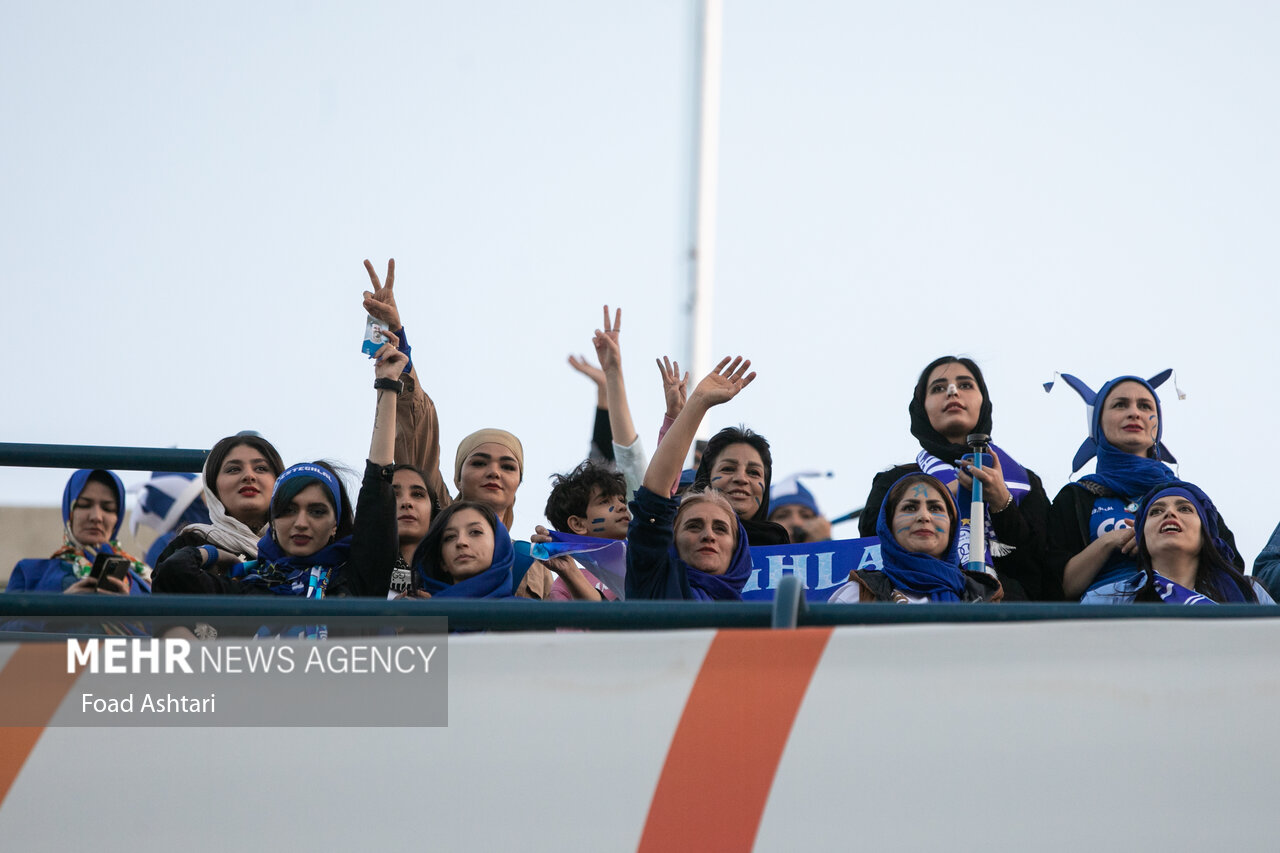
After half a century of banning women from entering stadiums in Iran, female Esteghlal fans were able to enter the stadium for the first time in 2022.

Esteghlal is one of the most supported teams in Iran and Asia. The club is based in Tehran and is popular in all parts of the country. Esteghlal also has a fan base in the United States, Europe and Persian Gulf countries. The match between Esteghlal and Jubilo Iwata in the 1998–99 Asian Club Championship final with 125,000 spectators is known as the most watched match in Asia, which was played at Azadi Stadium.

After the 1979 revolution, female fans were banned from entering stadiums in Iran. Finally, with international efforts, this ban was lifted in 2022 and female Esteghlal fans entered the stadiums in this year for the first time.

== Grounds ==
Azadi Stadium is Iran's national stadium and the largest in the country. Azadi Stadium officially had a capacity of 100,000 people at the beginning and was built to host the 1974 Asian Games. The stadium is part of the much larger Azadi Sports Complex and is surrounded by a rowing river, football training pitches, a weightlifting complex, swimming facilities and indoor volleyball and futsal courts, among many other amenities. Today, Azadi Stadium has a capacity of 78,116 after renovations in 2016.

Esteghlal's home stadium is Azadi (Persian: ورزشگاه آزادی), a football stadium in Tehran, Iran. The stadium's former name was Aryamehr Stadium which was changed after the Iranian Revolution. Prior to the construction of Azadi, Esteghlal used to play their games at Amjadieh Stadium.

== Players ==
=== Current squad ===
See also: 2026–27 Esteghlal F.C. season
As of 25 August 2026

Note: Flags indicate national team as defined under FIFA eligibility rules; some limited exceptions apply. Players may hold more than one non-FIFA nationality.

No.	Pos.	Nation	Player
2	DF	IRI	Saleh Hardani (vice-captain)
4	MF	IRI	Roozbeh Cheshmi (captain)
5	DF	UZB	Rustam Ashurmatov
6	DF	IRI	Saman Fallah
7	FW	ALB	Jasir Asani
8	MF	IRI	Amirmohammad Razzaghinia ^{U21}
9	FW	IRI	Mohammadreza Azadi
10	FW	UZB	Jaloliddin Masharipov (3rd captain)
11	FW	IRI	Saeed Saharkhizan ^{U23}
15	MF	IRI	Abolfazl Zamani ^{U21}
18	DF	IRI	Abolfazl Zoleykhaei ^{U21}
20	FW	IRI	Alireza Koushki
22	DF	IRI	Saman Touranian ^{U25}

No.	Pos.	Nation	Player
26	MF	IRI	Mehdi Ghayedi Heydari ^{U21}
27	DF	IRI	Hossein Goudarzi ^{U25}
33	DF	IRI	Aref Aghasi
36	MF	IRI	Alireza Mohebali ^{U21}
37	FW	IRI	Ehsan Kheradpishe ^{U19}
40	GK	IRI	Ahoora Nabizadeh ^{U21}
44	DF	IRI	Iliya Ebrahimi ^{U19}
45	DF	IRI	Hossein Gharloghi ^{U23}
60	GK	IRI	Seyed Arya Hosseinifard ^{U23}
76	GK	IRI	Habib Far Abbasi
80	FW	IRI	Mohammadhossein Eslami
87	MF	IRI	Esmaeil Gholizadeh ^{U21}
88	MF	IRI	Mehran Ahmadi ^{INJ}

- U19 = Under 19 year player. U21 = Under 21 year player. U23 = Under 23 year player. U25 = Under 25 year quota. INJ = Out of main squad due to injury..

=== Reserve Squad ===
Note: Flags indicate national team as defined under FIFA eligibility rules; some limited exceptions apply. Players may hold more than one non-FIFA nationality.

No.	Pos.	Nation	Player

=== Out on loan ===
Note: Flags indicate national team as defined under FIFA eligibility rules; some limited exceptions apply. Players may hold more than one non-FIFA nationality.

No.	Pos.	Nation	Player
1	GK	IRI	Mohammad Khalifeh ^{U23} (at Aluminium Arak)
3	DF	IRI	Bahram Goudarzi ^{U21} (at Aluminium Arak)
14	DF	IRI	Zargham Saadavi ^{U21} (at Malavan)
28	FW	IRI	Mojtaba Hasheminasab ^{U21} (at Mes Shahr-e Babak)

=== Club captains ===
Esteghlal captains since 1990.

#	Name	Captaincy
1	(Iran) Shahin Bayani	1990–1992
2	(Iran) Amir Ghalenoei	1992–1997
3	(Iran) Javad Zarincheh	1997–2000
4	(Iran) Mehdi Pashazadeh	2000–2003
5	(Iran) Mahmoud Fekri	2003–2007
6	(Iran) Alireza Mansourian	2007–2008
7	(Iran) Farhad Majidi	2008–2013
8	(Iran) Mehdi Rahmati	2013–2014; 2015–2019
9	(Iran) Amir Hossein Sadeghi	2014–2015
10	(Iran) Reza Enayati	2015
11	(Iran) Voria Ghafouri	2019–2022
12	(Iran) Hossein Hosseini	2022–2025
13	(Iran) Rouzbeh Cheshmi	2025–

== Personnel ==
=== Club managers ===
==== Current technical staff ====
Position	Name
Head coach	(Iran) Sohrab Bakhtiarizadeh
Assistant coach	(Iran) Milad Meydavoudi
Assistant coach	(Turkey) Özcan Bizati
Goalkeeper coach	(Iran) Behzad Gholampour
Fitness coach	(Iran) Salar Amini
Chief Analyst	(Iran) Nima Dehghan
Team Manager	(Iran) Bijan Taheri
Technical Director	(Iran) Behtash Fariba
Technical Director	(Iran) Majid Namjoo Motlagh
Technical Director	(Iran) Reza Hassanzadeh
Advisor	(Netherlands) Clarence Seedorf
Academy manager	(Iran) Alireza Asadi
U19 manager	(Iran) Hashem Beikzadeh
U15 manager	(Iran) Naser Ebadi
U12 manager	(Iran) Ramin Mohammadnezhad

==== Notable managers ====
Only managers who have won official trophies are listed.

Key

Name	Official Trophies
Domestic
PGPL	Iranian league (Persian Gulf Pro League)
HC	Hazfi Cup
ISC	Iranian Super Cup
ICC	Iran championship cup
TPL	Tehran Province League
THC	Tehran Hazfi Cup
TSC	Tehran Super Cup
Continental
ACL	AFC Champions League

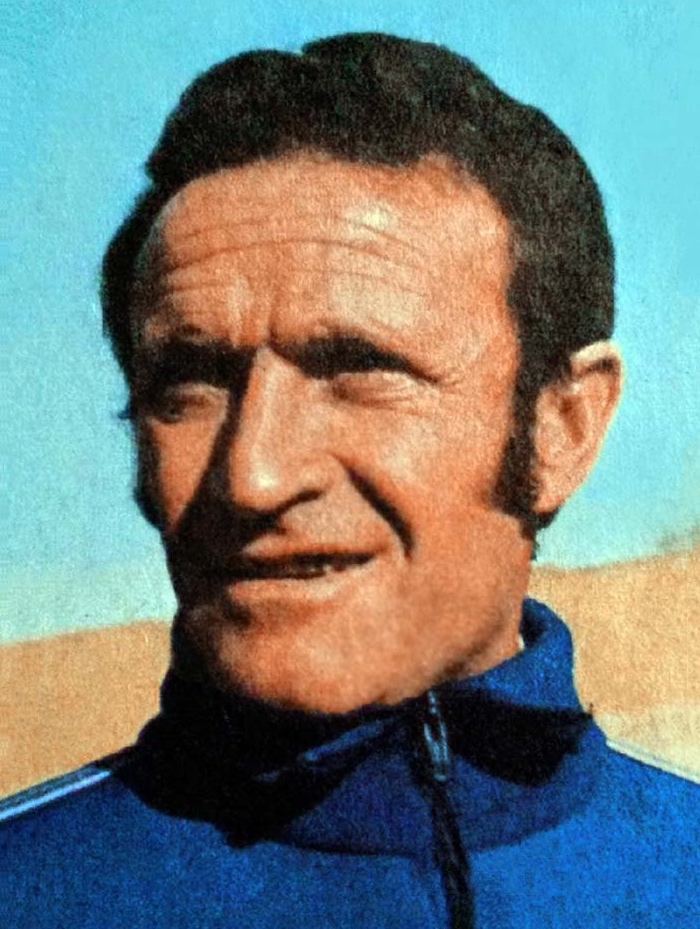
Zdravko Rajkov was Esteghlal's first international coach.

Name	Nat.	Period	Official Trophies								
Name	Nat.	Period	Total	Domestic							Continental
Name	Nat.	Period	Total	PGPL	HC	ISC	ICC	TPL	THC	TSC	ACL
Ali Danaeifard	(Iran)	1946–1953; 1954–1967; 1968–1970; 1976	13	0			1	8	4	0	0
Mansour Pourheidari	(Iran)	1979; 1981; 1983–1984; 1985–1986; 1986–1988; 1989–1992; 1995–1996; 2000–2002; 2003	8	2	2	0	0	3	0	0	1
Zdravko Rajkov	(Socialist Federal Republic of Yugoslavia)	1969–1971; 1971–1976	5	2	0	0	0	2	0	0	1
Amir Ghalenoei	(Iran)	2003–2006; 2008–2009; 2012–2015	5	3	2	0	0	0	0	0	0
Vladimir Đekić	(Germany)	1976–1979	1	0	1	0	0	0	0	0	0
Reza Naalchegar	(Iran)	1994; 1994	1	0	0	0	0	0	0	1	0
Nasser Hejazi	(Iran)	1996–1999	1	1	0	0	0	0	0	0	0
Parviz Mazloumi	(Iran)	2010–2012; 2015–2016	1	0	1	0	0	0	0	0	0
Winfried Schäfer	(Germany)	2017–2019	1	0	1	0	0	0	0	0	0
Farhad Majidi	(Iran)	2019–2020; 2021–2022	1	1	0	0	0	0	0	0	0
Ricardo Sá Pinto	(Portugal)	2022–2023	1	0	0	1	0	0	0	0	0
Mojtaba Jabbari	(Iran)	2025	1	0	1	0	0	0	0	0	0
Ricardo Sá Pinto	(Portugal)	2025–2026									
Sohrab Bakhtiarizadeh	(Iran)	2025-2025 2026–									

=== Chairmen ===
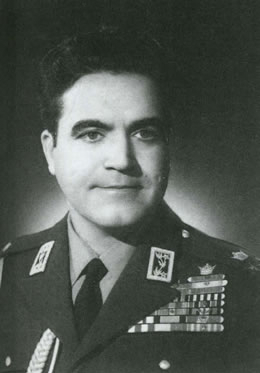
Parviz Khosravani, the founder and the first chairman of the club

==== Current management board ====
Chairman	(Iran) Mostafa Motedayyen
Board president	(Iran) Ali Tajernia
Other board members	(Iran) Mohammadreza Najafi (Iran) Seyed Hossein Alavi-Moghadam

==== Notable Chairmen ====
Chairman	Tenure
(Iran) Enayatollah Atashi (acting)	April 1979 – May 1979
(Iran) Nader Faryadshiran	June 1985 – September 1985
(Iran) Ali Agha-Mohammadi	June 1989 – September 1989
(Iran) Ali Fathollahzadeh	28 October 1996 – 20 May 2003, 30 April 2007 – 17 September 2008, 9 June 2010 – 17 May 2014, 26 February 2020 – 20 March 2020
(Iran) Amir Reza Vaezi-Ashtiani	20 September 2008 – 31 May 2010
(Iran) Mostafa Ajorlu	24 September 2021 – 15 October 2022

== Honours ==
Esteghlal has won 39 championship titles in provincial, national, continental and international cups.

Esteghlal F.C. official honours
Type		Competition	Titles	Seasons
Domestic	National			
Domestic	National	League	9	1970–71, 1974–75, 1989–90, 1997–98, 2000–01, 2005–06, 2008–09, 2012–13, 2021–22
Domestic	National	Hazfi Cup	8	1976–77, 1995–96, 1999–2000, 2001–02, 2007–08, 2011–12, 2017–18, 2024–25
Domestic	National	Super Cup	1	2022
Domestic	National	Championship Cup	1	1957
Domestic	Provincial (High Level)	Tehran League	13	1949–50, 1952–53, 1956–57, 1957–58, 1959–60, 1960–61, 1962–63, 1968–69, 1970–1971, 1972–73, 1983–84, 1985–86, 1991–92
Domestic	Provincial (High Level)	Tehran Hazfi Cup	4	1946–47, 1950–51, 1958–59, 1960–61
Domestic	Provincial (High Level)	Tehran Super Cup	1*	1994
Continental		AFC Champions League	2**	1970, 1990–91

- record
- * shared record
- ** Iran record

=== Domestic ===
==== League ====
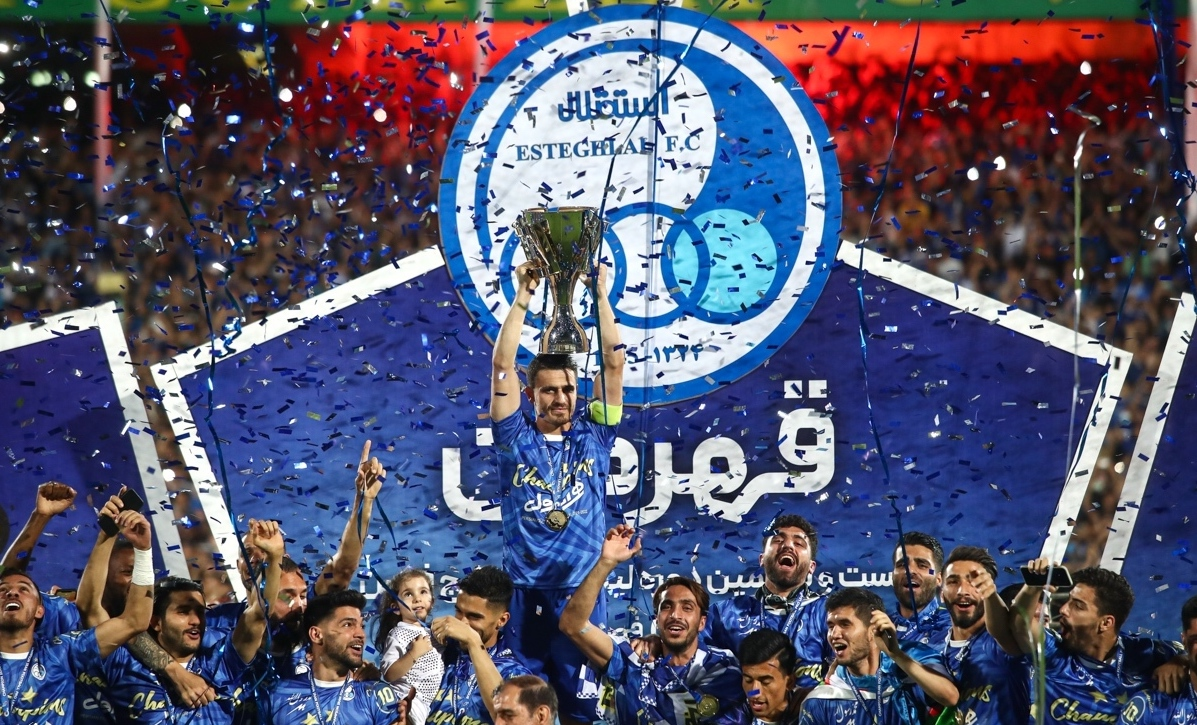
Esteghlal were crowned champions ending the 2021-22 Persian Gulf Pro League season without a single defeat – the first Iranian team ever to do so in a 30-game league season.

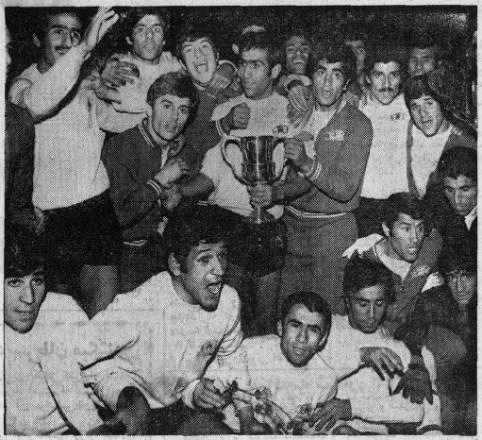
Taj championship in the 1970 AFC Champions League, first Asian title for an Iranian club.

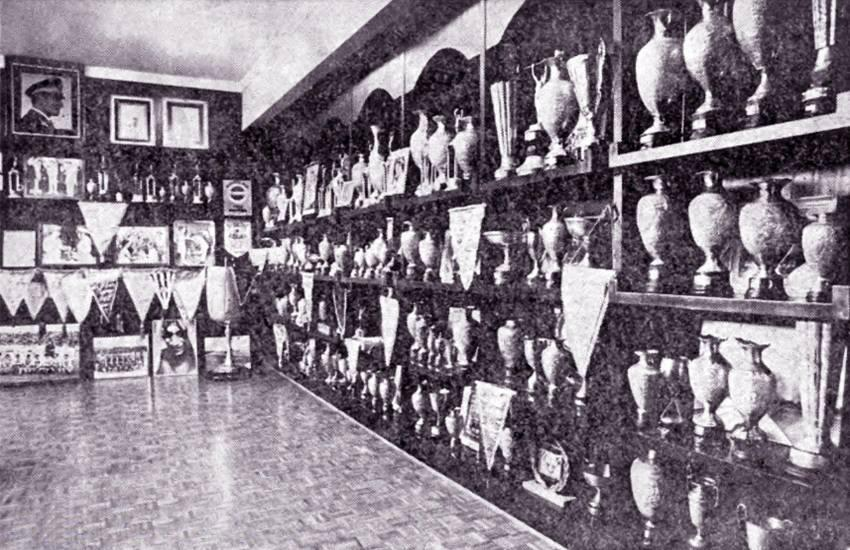
The Taj Club Museum, which was looted by Islamic marauding revolutionaries after the 1979 revolution. Most of the museum's trophies were won by the club's football team.

- Iran League

(gold) Winners (9): 1970–71, 1974–75, 1989–90, 1997–98, 2000–01, 2005–06, 2008–09, 2012–13, 2021–22
(silver) Runners-up (11): 1973–74, 1991–92, 1994–95, 1998–99, 1999–2000, 2001–02, 2003–04, 2010–11, 2016–17, 2019–20, 2023–24

==== Cups ====
- Hazfi Cup (record)

(gold) Winners (8): 1976–77, 1995–96, 1999–2000, 2001–02, 2007–08, 2011–12, 2017–18, 2024–25
(silver) Runners-up (7): 1989–90, 1998–99, 2003–04, 2015–16, 2019–20, 2020–21, 2022–2023

- Super Cup

(gold) Winners (1): 2022
(silver) Runners-up (2): 2018, 2025

==== Provincial ====
- Tehran League (record)

(gold) Winners (13): 1949–50, 1952–53, 1956–57, 1957–58, 1959–60, 1960–61, 1962–63, 1968–69, 1970–1971, 1972–73, 1983–84, 1985–86, 1991–92
(silver) Runners-up (7): 1946–47, 1951–52, 1958–59, 1969–70, 1982–83, 1989–90, 1990–91

- Tehran Hazfi Cup

(gold) Winners (4): 1946–47, 1950–51, 1958–59, 1960–61
(silver) Runners-up (3): 1945–46, 1957–58, 1969–70

- Tehran Super Cup (shared record)

(gold) Winners (1): 1994

=== Continental ===
- Asian Club Championship / AFC Champions League (Iran record)

(gold) Winners (2): 1970, 1990–91
(silver) Runners-up (2): 1991, 1998–99
(bronze) Third place (2): 1971, 2001–02
Semi-finalists (1): 2013

- Asian Cup Winners' Cup

Fourth place (2): 1996, 2000–01

=== International ===
- (India) DCM Trophy
  - Winners (4): 1969, 1970, 1971, 1989
- (India) Bordoloi Trophy
  - Winners (1): 1989
- Turkmenistan President's Cup
  - Winners (1): 1998

=== Doubles and Treble and Four or More Trophies in One Season ===
Esteghlal has achieved the Double on 7 occasions in its history:

- Iran League and Tehran League
  - 1957–58 Season
  - 1970–71 Season
- Iran League and Turkmenistan President's Cup
  - 1997–98 Season
- Tehran League and Tehran Hazfi Cup
  - 1958–59 Season
  - 1960–61 Season
- Tehran League and DCM Trophy
  - 1968–69 Season
- AFC Champions League and Tehran League
  - 1990–91 Season

Esteghlal has achieved the Treble on 2 occasions in its history:

- AFC Champions League and Iran League and Tehran League
  - 1970–71 Season
- Iran League and DCM Trophy and Bordoloi Trophy
  - 1989–90 Season

=== International Minor Tournaments ===
- Qatar Independence Cup
  - Winners (1): 1991
- (Iran) Caspian International Cup
  - Winners (1): 1998

== Statistics and records ==
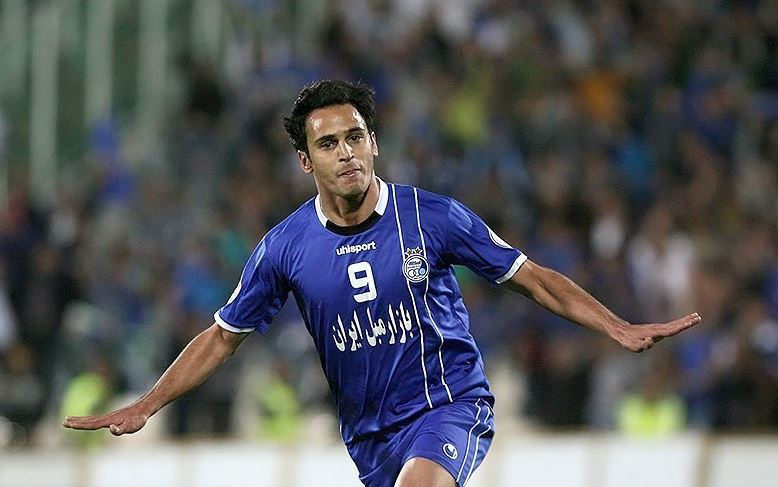
Arash Borhani is Esteghlal's all-time leading goalscorer with 108 goals in all competitions. He scored a poker at 13–0 victory against Zoratkaran Parsabad Ardabil F.C.

=== Official Matches ===
- Most goals scored in a match:
  - 18 – 0 (1 time) (Iran record)
  - 13 – 0 (1 time)
  - 13 – 1 (1 time)
  - 11 – 0 (2 times)
  - 11 – 1 (1 time)
  - 10 – 0 (4 times)
  - 10 – 1 (1 time)
  - 9 – 0 (4 times)
  - 9 – 1 (1 time)
  - 8 – 0 (3 times)
  - 8 – 1 (3 times)
  - 7 – 0 (8 times)
  - 7 – 1 (3 times)
  - 6 – 0 (11 times)
  - 6 – 1 (6 times)
  - 6 – 2 (2 times)
  - 6 – 3 (1 time)
  - 5 – 0 (25 times)
  - 5 – 1 (14 times)
  - 5 – 2 (5 times)
  - 5 – 3 (2 times)
- Most goals conceded in a match:
  - 7 – 1 (1 time)
- Player with a most goal in a single match:
  - Ali Jabbari with 5 goals (3 time)
  - Arash Borhani with 5 goals
  - Ali Jabbari with 4 goals (2 time)
  - Gholamhossein Farzami with 4 goals (2 time)
  - Alireza Akbarpour with 4 goals (2 time)
  - Dariush Mostafavi with 4 goals
  - Gholamhossein Mazloumi with 4 goals
  - jafar Mokhtarifar with 4 goals
  - Samad Marfavi with 4 goals
  - Adel Hardani with 4 goals
  - Farhad Majidi with 4 goals
  - Dariush Yazdani with 4 goals
  - Mahdi Seyed-Salehi with 4 goals

=== Statistics in PGPL ===
- Seasons in PGPL: 26 (all) (record)
- Best position in PGPL: First (2005–06, 2008–2009, 2012–13, 2021-22)
- Worst position in PGPL: 13 (2007–08)
- Most Points scored in a season: 68 (2021-22) (record)
- Fewest losses in a season: 0 Loss (2021-22) (record)
- Most goals scored in a season: 70 (2008–09) (record)
- Most goals scored in a match:
  - 7 – 1 (1 time)
  - 6 – 0 (1 time)
  - 6 – 1 (1 time)
  - 6 – 2 (1 time)
  - 5 – 0 (5 time)
  - 5 – 1 (2 time)
  - 5 – 2 (1 time)
  - 4 – 0 (8 time)
  - 4 – 1 (10 time)
  - 4 – 2 (6 time)
  - 4 – 3 (2 time)
- Most goals conceded in a match: 4 – 1 (3 times)
- Player with a most goal in a single match:
  - Alireza Akbarpour with 4 goals
  - Reza Enayati with 3 goals (2 time)
  - Arash Borhani with 3 goals
  - Siavash Akbarpour with 3 goals
  - Mohsen Karimi with 3 goals
  - Cheick Diabaté with 3 goals
  - Mahdi Ghayedi with 3 goals

=== Statistics in ACC/ACL/ACWC ===
- Most goals scored in a match:
  - 8 – 0 (1 time)
  - 7 – 0 (1 time)
  - 5 – 0 (2 time)
  - 5 – 2 (2 time)
  - 5 – 3 (1 time)
  - 4 – 0 (1 time)
  - 4 – 2 (2 times)
  - 4 – 3 (1 time)
  - 3 – 0 (13 time)
  - 3 – 1 (3 time)
  - 3 – 2 (1 time)
- Most goals conceded in a match: 1 – 6 (1 time)
- Player with the most goals in a single match:
  - Farhad Majidi with 4 goals
  - Ali Jabari with 3 goals
  - Farhad Majidi with 3 goals
  - Ali Latifi with 3 goals
  - Mame Thiam with 3 goals

=== Statistics in Hazfi Cup ===
- Most goals scored in a match:
  - 13 – 0 (1 time)
  - 10 – 1 (1 time)
  - 9 – 0 (1 time)
  - 8 – 1 (2 time)
  - 6 – 0 (2 time)
  - 5 – 0 (4 time)
  - 5 – 1 (1 time)
  - 5 – 2 (1 time)
  - 5 – 3 (1 time)
- Most goals conceded in a match: 0 – 3 (1 time)
- Player with the most goals in a single match:
  - Arash Borhani with 5 goals
  - Alireza Akbarpour with 4 goals
  - Adel Hardani with 4 goals
  - Dariush Yazdani with 4 goals
  - Mehdi Seyed-Salehi with 4 goals

== Esteghlal W.F.C. ==
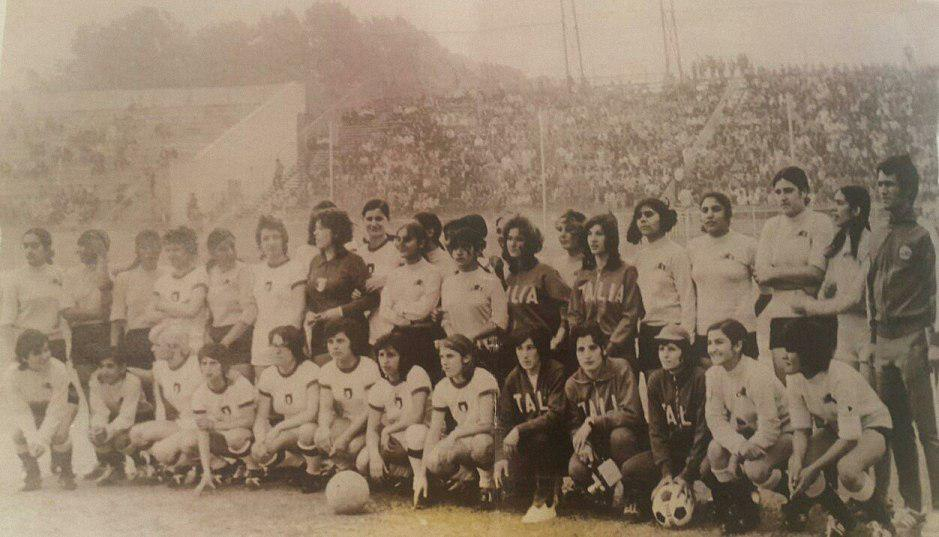
Friendly match of Taj F.C. Women's Football team and selected team of Italian women footballers in 1970

Esteghlal was the first club in Iran that established a team for women's football. To reach this goal the club has made some Camps for training players.

The first attempts to launch women's football in Iran began in the late 1960s. In 1969, with the increase in the number of women interested in football in Iran, the Football Federation sent several women to FIFA training courses. During the trip, Iranian coaches were able to watch matches of Asian women's soccer teams such as South Korea, India and Singapore, held at the venue. Iranian football authorities then decided to form women's soccer teams at the club level. Esteghlal F.C. (TAJ) was the first Iranian club to establish a women's soccer training class and set up its own women's team.

The women's team which competed in the Kowsar Women Football League was dissolved in 2016 due to financial issues.

Achievements
Preceded by Maccabi Tel Aviv (Israel)	Asian Club Championship; 1970	Succeeded by Maccabi Tel Aviv (Israel)
Preceded by Liaoning FC (China)	Asian Club Championship; 1990–91	Succeeded by Al-Hilal (Saudi Arabia)
