= 2001–02 Hazfi Cup =

Tournament details
- Country: Iran

Final positions
- Champions: Esteghlal Tehran
- Runners-up: Fajr Sepasi

The Hazfi Cup 2001–02 was the 15th edition of Iran's football knockout competition. The tournament is organised annually by the Football Federation Islamic Republic of Iran.

== Bracket ==
- Teams from the same city met only once.

Round of 16
Sepahan	1	1	2
Shahrdari Ahvaz	0	1	1
Est Rasht
Foolad	(w/o)
Shahrdari Mashhad	0	0	0
Zob Ahan	2	4	6
Esteghlal	4	-	4
PAS Tehran	2	-	2
Zob Felezat	0	0	1
Tractor Sazi	4	3	7
Fajr Sepasi	2	-	2
Bargh Shiraz	0	-	0
Paykan	1	1	2
Mes Kerman	0	2	2
Persepolis	1	2	3
Aboumoslem	1	2	3

Quarter-finals
Sepahan	0	2	2
Foolad	0	1	1
Zob Ahan	0	1	1
Esteghlal	0	3	3
Tractor Sazi	1	0	1
Fajr Sepasi	1	1	2
Paykan	1	-	1
Persepolis	0	-	0

Semi-finals
Sepahan	4	1	5
Esteghlal	2	3	5
Fajr Sepasi	1	0	1 (8)
Paykan	0	1	1 (7)

Final
Esteghlal	2	2	4
Fajr Sepasi	1	2	3

== Semi-final ==
Team 1	Agg.	Team 2	1st leg	2nd leg
Sepahan	5–5	Esteghlal	4–2	1–3

Team 1	Agg.	Team 2	1st leg	2nd leg
Fajr Sepasi	1–1 (8–7 (p))	Paykan Tehran	0–1	1–0

== Final ==
Team 1	Agg.	Team 2	1st leg	2nd leg
Fajr Sepasi	3–4	Esteghlal	1–2	2–2

June 16, 2002 First leg	Fajr Sepasi	1–2	Esteghlal Tehran	Shiraz, Hafezieh Stadium
	Madanchi 34'		Akbari 54'; Dinmohammadi 87'

June 20, 2002 Second leg	Esteghlal Tehran	2–2	Fajr Sepasi	Tehran, Takhti Stadium
	Mousavi 7', 38'		Zey 6'; Madanchi 20'	Referee: Jalal Moradi
