= 1998–99 Esteghlal F.C. season =

Esteghlal F.C.
1998–99 season
- President: Ali Fathollahzadeh
- Head coach: Nasser Hejazi
- Stadium: Azadi Stadium
- Azadegan League: Runners-up
- Hazfi Cup: Runners-up
- AFC Champions League: Runners-up
- Top goalscorer: League: Ali Mousavi (10); All: Ali Mousavi (15)
Home colours	Away colours

The 1998–99 season was the Esteghlal Football Club's 7th season in the Azadegan League, and their 5th consecutive season in the top division of Iranian football. They are also competing in the Hazfi Cup and Asian Club Championship, and 54th year in existence as a football club.

== Player ==
As of 1 September 2018.

Note: Flags indicate national team as defined under FIFA eligibility rules; some limited exceptions apply. Players may hold more than one non-FIFA nationality.

No.	Pos.	Nation	Player
1	GK	IRN	Parviz Boroumand
2	DF	IRN	Javad Zarincheh
3	DF	IRN	Ali Chini
4	DF	IRN	Reza Hassanzadeh
5	DF	IRN	Kazem Mahmoudi
6	DF	IRN	Mahmoud Fekri
7	MF	IRN	Attila Hejazi
8	MF	IRN	Alireza Mansourian
9	FW	IRN	Ali Mousavi
10	MF	IRN	Dariush Yazdani
11	FW	IRN	Mohsen Garousi
12	FW	IRN	Mohammad Momeni
14	MF	IRN	Sirous Dinmohammadi
15	MF	IRN	Adel Hardani
16	MF	IRN	Alireza Akbarpour

No.	Pos.	Nation	Player
17	DF	IRN	Sohrab Bakhtiarizadeh
18	FW	IRN	Fred Malekian
19	MF	IRN	Serjik Teymourian
20	DF	IRN	Mohammad Taghavi
21	FW	IRN	Farhad Majidi
22	MF	IRN	Mohammad Navazi
24	DF	IRN	Mohammad Khorramgah
25	MF	IRN	Javid Shokri
—	GK	IRN	Mohammad Ali Yahyavi
—	GK	IRN	Masoud Ghasemi
—	DF	IRN	Ayoub Asgharkhani
—	MF	IRN	Farzad Majidi
—	MF	IRN	Hashem Heydari
—	FW	IRN	Edmond Akhtar

== Pre-season and friendlies ==
25 October 1998	Esteghlal (Iran)	2 – 1	Oman	Tehran, Iran
	Mohammad Navazi 53', 84'	Report	Qasim Masoud 56'	Stadium: Azadi Stadium; Referee: Mohammad Fanaei
Note: In this match Mohammad Fanaei Goodbyed from refereeing football

== Competitions ==
=== Overview ===
Competition	Started round	Current position / round	Final position / round	First match	Last match
Azadegan League	—	—	Runners-up	18 September 1998	24 May 1999
Hazfi Cup	1/8 finals	—	Runners-up	14 December 1998	11 July 1999
Asian Club Championship	—	—	Runners-up	9 October 1998	30 April 1999

Updated to match played 13 October 2018
Source: Competitions

=== Azadegan League ===
==== Standings ====
Pos	Team	Pld	W	D	L	GF	GA	GD	Pts	Qualification or relegation
1	Persepolis (C)	30	19	8	3	56	21	+35	65	Qualification for the 1999–2000 Asian Club Championship
2	Esteghlal	30	14	11	5	50	28	+22	53	Qualification for the 1999–2000 Asian Cup Winners' Cup
3	Sepahan	30	13	14	3	38	19	+19	53	
4	Saipa	30	13	10	7	43	33	+10	49	
5	PAS	30	9	15	6	30	25	+5	42	

Updated to match(es) played on 1 Sep 2018. Source: RSSSF
Rules for classification: 1) Points; 2) Goal difference; 3) Goals scored.
(C) Champions

==== Results summary ====
Overall								Home						Away					
Pld	W	D	L	GF	GA	GD	Pts	W	D	L	GF	GA	GD	W	D	L	GF	GA	GD
30	14	11	5	50	28	+22	53	7	5	3	26	14	+12	7	6	2	24	14	+10

Last updated: 13 October 2018.
Source: RSSSF

==== Results by round ====
Round	1	2	3	4	5	6	7	8	9	10	11	12	13	14	15	16	17	18	19	20	21	22	23	24	25	26	27	28	29	30
Ground	A	H	A	A	H	A	H	A	A	H	H	A	A	H	A	H	A	H	H	A	H	A	H	H	A	A	H	H	A	H
Result	W	D	D	W	L	W	L	W	D	L	W	D	W	D	D	W	W	D	D	W	W	D	W	W	D	L	W	W	L	D

Source: Competitive matches
A = Away; H = Home; W = Win; D = Draw; L = Loss

==== Matches ====
Win Draw Loss Postponed

27 December 1998 1	Foolad	0 – 3	Esteghlal	Ahvaz
			Fred Malekian 52', 71'; Alireza Akbarpour 87'	Stadium: Takhti Stadium

18 September 1998 2	Esteghlal	1 – 1	Sanat Naft	Tehran
	Ali Mousavi 15'		Latif Janami 50'	Stadium: Azadi Stadium

25 September 1998 3	PAS Tehran	1 – 1	Esteghlal	Tehran
	Hossein Khatibi 46'		Ali Mousavi 30'	Stadium: Azadi Stadium

2 October 1998 4	Esteghlal	2 – 1	Malavan	Anzali
	Ali Mousavi 8'; Ali Chini 30'		Shahram Parnianfar 53'	Stadium: Takhti Stadium

3 November 1998 5	Esteghlal	1 – 2	Aboomoslem	Tehran
	Mohammad Momeni (pen.)		Abdoljalil Golcheshmeh (pen.); Bagher Mahmoudi	Stadium: Azadi Stadium

16 October 1998 6	Tractor Sazi	1 – 4	Esteghlal	Tabriz
	Kourosh Barmak 13'		Alireza Akbarpour 9'; Dariush Yazdani 35'; Alireza Mansourian 86'; Atila Hejazi 90'	Stadium: Takhti Stadium

1 January 1999 7	Esteghlal	0 – 1	Zob Ahan	Tehran
			Kamal Hosseini	Stadium: Azadi Stadium

5 January 1999 8	Bank Melli	1 – 3	Esteghlal	Tehran
	Reza Azizi 70'		Alireza Akbarpour 30'; Sirous Dinmohammadi 39'; Adel Hardani 70'	Stadium: Azadi Stadium

8 November 1998 9	Shahrdari Tabriz	0 – 0	Esteghlal	Tabriz
				Stadium: Takhti Stadium

13 November 1998 10	Esteghlal	0 – 1	Persepolis	Tehran
			Mehdi Hasheminasab 45+3'	Stadium: Azadi Stadium

12 January 1999 11	Esteghlal	4 – 2	Polyacryl	Tehran
	Fred Malekian 3', 23'; Alireza Akbarpour 8'; Mahmoud Fekri 52'		Seyed Ali Mirzaei 54', 85'	Stadium: Azadi Stadium

19 January 1999 12	Chooka Talesh	1 – 1	Esteghlal	Talesh
	Iman Amini 70'		Sirous Dinmohammadi 48' (pen.)	Stadium: Pourya-ye Vali Stadium

9 March 1999 13	Fajr Sepasi	0 – 1	Esteghlal	Shiraz
			Fred Malekian 44'	Stadium: Hafezieh Stadium

4 April 1999 14	Esteghlal	0 – 0	Saipa	Tehran
				Stadium: Takhti Stadium

13 April 1999 15	Sepahan	1 – 1	Esteghlal	Isfahan
	Majid Basirat 18' (pen.)		Alireza Akbarpour 22'	Stadium: Takhti Stadium

24 January 1999 16	Esteghlal	3 – 0	Foolad	Tehran
	Ali Mousavi 17'; Alireza Akbarpour 49'; Fred Malekian 77'			Stadium: Azadi Stadium

29 January 1999 17	Sanat Naft	0 – 1	Esteghlal	Abadan
			Ali Mousavi 4'	Stadium: Takhti Stadium

6 February 1999 18	Esteghlal	1 – 1	PAS Tehran	Tehran
	Sirous Dinmohammadi 85' (pen.)		Hossein Khatibi 50'	Stadium: Azadi Stadium

14 February 1999 19	Esteghlal	1 – 1	Malavan	Tehran
	Sirous Dinmohammadi 62' (pen.)		Mohammad Khorramgah 4' (o.g.)	Stadium: Azadi Stadium

4 May 1999 20	Aboomoslem	1 – 2	Esteghlal	Mashhad
	Abdoljalil Golcheshmeh 30' (pen.)		Farhad Majidi 12'; Ali Mousavi 65'	Stadium: Takhti Stadium

13 May 1999 21	Esteghlal	3 – 2	Tractor Sazi	Tehran
	Sirous Dinmohammadi 5' (pen.); Farhad Majidi 8'; Ali Mousavi 34'		Kourosh Barmak 44' (pen.); Davoud Rostami 60'	Stadium: Azadi Stadium

5 March 1999 22	Zob Ahan	1 – 1	Esteghlal	Isfahan
	Javad Mohagheghian 67'		Mojtaba Taghavi 33'	Stadium: 22 Bahman Stadium

14 March 1999 23	Esteghlal	2 – 0	Bank Melli	Tehran
	Farhad Majidi 40'; Fred Malekian 63'			Stadium: Azadi Stadium

19 March 1999 24	Esteghlal	1 – 0	Shahrdari Tabriz	Tehran
	Hashem Heydari			Stadium: Azadi Stadium

9 April 1999 25	Persepolis	1 – 1	Esteghlal	Tehran
	Mehdi Hasheminasab 4'		Fred Malekian 44'	Stadium: Azadi Stadium

18 April 1999 26	Polyacryl	1 – 0	Esteghlal	Isfahan
	Farzad Heydari 69'

19 April 1999 27	Esteghlal	6 – 1	Chooka Talesh	Tehran
	Sirous Dinmohammadi 1', 58' (penalty missed); Ali Mousavi 44' (pen.); Farhad Majidi 55', 62'; Hashem Heydari 89'		Arash Shafiei 7'	Stadium: Azadi Stadium

19 April 1999 28	Esteghlal	2 – 1	Fajr Sepasi	Tehran
	Hashem Heydari 13'; Mahmoud Fekri 47'		Mahmoud Khorramzi 75'	Stadium: Azadi Stadium

9 May 1999 29	Saipa	4 – 3	Esteghlal	Tehran
	Majid Saleh 25'; Safdar Youseflou 61'; Behnam Abolghasempour 70', 82'		Ali Mousavi 11', 34'; Sirous Dinmohammadi 58'	Stadium: Azadi Stadium

24 May 1999 30	Esteghlal	1 – 1	Sepahan	Tehran
	Farhad Majidi 36'; Sirous Dinmohammadi (penalty missed)		Ahmad Momenzadeh 38'	Stadium: Azadi Stadium

=== Hazfi Cup ===
==== 1/8 finals ====
14 December 1998 First leg	Esteghlal	8 – 0	Shahrdari Ardabil	Tehran
	Adel Hardani; Attila Hejazi; Ali Chini; Alireza Akbarpour			Stadium: Azadi Stadium

9 February 1999 Second leg	Shahrdari Ardabil	0 – 0 (0 – 8 agg.)	Esteghlal	Ardabil
				Stadium: Takhti Stadium

==== Quarterfinals ====
20 June 1999 First leg	Nassaji Mazandaran	0 – 2	Esteghlal	Qa'em Shahr
			Ali Mousavi 16', 90'	Stadium: Vatani Stadium

27 June 1999 Second leg	Esteghlal	5 – 0 (7 – 0 agg.)	Nassaji Mazandaran	Tehran
	Fred Malekian 7', 43'; 51' (o.g.); Hashem Heydari 54' (pen.); Sirous Dinmohammadi 67'			Stadium: Azadi Stadium

==== Semifinal ====
2 July 1999	Esteghlal	1 – 0	PAS Tehran	Tehran
	Fred Malekian			Stadium: Azadi Stadium

==== Final ====
11 July 1999	Esteghlal	1 – 2	Persepolis	Tehran
	Bakhtiarizadeh 50'		Hasheminasab 12' (pen.); Peyrovani 86'	Stadium: Azadi Stadium
Note: 47th Tehran Derby

=== Asian Club Championship ===
==== Second round ====
9 October 1998 First leg	Al-Quwa Al-Jawiya (Iraq)	1 – 1	(Iran) Esteghlal	Baghdad, Iraq
	Ali Mousavi

23 October 1998 Second leg	Esteghlal (Iran)	2 – 0 (3 – 1 agg.)	(Iraq) Al-Quwa Al-Jawiya	Tehran, Iran
	Alireza Akbarpour 35'; Mohammad Momeni 44'			Stadium: Azadi Stadium

==== Quarterfinals ====
===== West Asia =====
Team	Pld	W	D	L	GF	GA	GD	Pts
(United Arab Emirates) Al-Ain	3	2	0	1	7	2	+5	6
(Iran) Esteghlal	3	2	0	1	3	2	+1	6
(Saudi Arabia) Al-Hilal	3	1	0	2	5	5	0	3
(Turkmenistan) Köpetdag Aşgabat	3	1	0	2	4	10	−6	3

25 February 1999 1	Al-Hilal (Saudi Arabia)	1 – 2	(Iran) Esteghlal	Al Ain, UAE
	Bashar Abdullah 47'		Farhad Majidi 13'; Sirous Dinmohammadi 40'

27 February 1999 2	Al-Ain (United Arab Emirates)	0 – 1	(Iran) Esteghlal	Al Ain, UAE
			Alireza Akbarpour 70'

1 March 1999 3	Esteghlal (Iran)	1 – 0	(Turkmenistan) Köpetdag Aşgabat	Al Ain, UAE
			Vladimir Khalikov 72'

==== Semifinals ====
28 April 1999	Dalian Wanda (China)	3 – 4 (a.e.t.)	(Iran) Esteghlal	Tehran, Iran
	Yan Song 60' 63'; Li Ming 77'		Mahmoud Fekri 44'; Ali Mousavi 51' 108'; Alireza Akbarpour 84'	Stadium: Azadi Stadium

==== Final ====
30 April 1999	Júbilo Iwata (Japan)	2 – 1	(Iran) Esteghlal	Tehran, Iran
	Hideto Suzuki 36'; Masashi Nakayama 45'		Sirous Dinmohammadi 66'	Stadium: Azadi Stadium

== See also ==
- 1998–99 Azadegan League
- 1998–99 Hazfi Cup
- 1998–99 Asian Club Championship
