= 1997–98 Esteghlal F.C. season =

Esteghlal F.C.
1998–99 season
- President: Ali Fathollahzadeh
- Head coach: Nasser Hejazi
- Stadium: Azadi Stadium
- Azadegan League: 1st
- Top goalscorer: League: Alireza Akbarpour; Fred Malekian (9); All: Alireza Akbarpour; Fred Malekian (9)
Home colours	Away colours

The 1997–98 season was the Esteghlal Football Club's 6th season in the Azadegan League, and their 4th consecutive season in the top division of Iranian football. They are also competing in the Caspian Cup and Turkmenistan President's Cup, and 53rd year in existence as a football club.

== Player ==
As of 1 September 2018.

Note: Flags indicate national team as defined under FIFA eligibility rules; some limited exceptions apply. Players may hold more than one non-FIFA nationality.

No.	Pos.	Nation	Player
1	GK	IRI	Parviz Boroumand
2	DF	IRI	Javad Zarincheh
3	DF	IRI	Ali Chini
4	DF	IRI	Reza Hassanzadeh
5	DF	IRI	Ahmed Kabianpour
6	DF	IRI	Mohammad Khorramgah
7	MF	IRI	Amin Rasti
8	MF	IRI	Alireza Mansourian
9	MF	IRI	Asghar Rasoulzadeh
10	DF	IRI	Mehdi Pashazadeh
10	MF	IRI	Dariush Yazdani
11	FW	IRI	Mohsen Garousi
14	MF	IRI	Mohammad Nouri
15	FW	IRI	Farhad Majidi
16	FW	IRI	Alireza Akbarpour

No.	Pos.	Nation	Player
17	MF	IRI	Attila Hejazi
18	FW	IRI	Fred Malekian
19	MF	IRI	Serjik Teymourian
20	DF	IRI	Mohammad Taghavi
22	MF	IRI	Mohammad Reza Mehranpour
25	MF	IRI	Javid Shokri
—	GK	IRI	Mohammad Ali Yahyavi
—	GK	IRI	Hamid Reza Babaei
—	GK	IRI	Farhad Vali
—	MF	IRI	Hashem Heydari
—	MF	IRI	Farzad Majidi
—	MF	IRI	Vahid Rezaei
—	MF	IRI	Edmond Akhtar
—	FW	IRI	Samad Marfavi

== Pre-season and friendlies ==
Tolypers Qazvin	3 – 3	Esteghlal	Qazvin
		Ali Akbarian; Samad Marfavi; Mirshad Majedi

Esteghlal	5 – 1	Montakhab Shahr-e Rey	Tehran
Mohsen Garousi; Ahmed Kabianpour; Mohammad Momeni; Fred Malekian

== Competitions ==
=== Overview ===
Competition	Started round	Current position / round	Final position / round	First match	Last match
Azadegan League	—	—	Winner	30 July 1997	18 August 1998
Caspian Cup	—	—	Winner	15 July 1997	25 July 1997
Turkmenistan President's Cup	—	—	Winner	11 February 1998	19 February 1998

Updated to match played 13 October 2018
Source: Competitions

=== Azadegan League ===
==== Standings ====
Pos	Team	Pld	W	D	L	GF	GA	GD	Pts	Qualification or relegation
1	Esteghlal (C)	28	16	10	2	46	21	+25	58	Qualification for the 1998–99 Asian Club Championship
2	PAS	28	13	13	2	33	20	+13	52	Qualification for the 1998–99 Asian Cup Winners' Cup
3	Zob Ahan	28	11	12	5	31	20	+11	45	
4	Fajr Sepasi	28	10	10	8	37	27	+10	40	
5	Sh. Tabriz	28	10	9	9	37	29	+8	39	

Updated to match(es) played on 1 September 2018. Source: RSSSF
Rules for classification: 1) Points; 2) Goal difference; 3) Goals scored.
Note: Persepolis withdrew due to international commitments of the players. before withdrew Persepolis had 5 wins 2 draws and 1 loss.
(C) Champions

==== Results summary ====
Overall								Home						Away					
Pld	W	D	L	GF	GA	GD	Pts	W	D	L	GF	GA	GD	W	D	L	GF	GA	GD
28	16	10	2	46	21	+25	58	11	3	0	32	11	+21	5	7	2	14	10	+4

Last updated: 13 October 2018.
Source: RSSSF

==== Results by round ====
Round	1	2	3	4	5	6	7	8	9	10	11	12	13	14	15	16	17	18	19	20	21	22	23	24	25	26	27	28
Ground	H	A	A	H	A	H	A	A	H	H	A	A	H	H	A	H	H	A	H	A	H	H	A	A	H	H	A	A
Result	W	D	D	W	W	W	D	D	W	W	D	D	D	W	W	W	D	W	W	L	W	W	D	L	W	D	W	W

Source: Competitive matches
A = Away; H = Home; W = Win; D = Draw; L = Loss

==== Matches ====
Win Draw Loss Postponed

30 July 1997 1	Esteghlal	2 – 0	Esteghlal Ahvaz	Tehran
				Stadium: Azadi Stadium

11 September 1997 2	Polyacryl	3 – 3	Esteghlal	Isfahan
				Stadium: Naghsh-e Jahan Stadium

23 September 1997 3	PAS	0 – 0	Esteghlal	Tehran
				Stadium: Azadi Stadium

28 September 1997 4	Esteghlal	2 – 1	Payam Mashhad	Tehran
				Stadium: Azadi Stadium

16 November 1997 5	Bargh Shiraz	0 – 3	Esteghlal	Yazd

4 October 1997 6	Esteghlal	5 – 0	Foolad	Tehran
				Stadium: Azadi Stadium

11 November 1997 7	Shahrdari Tabriz	0 – 0	Esteghlal	Tabriz
				Stadium: Takhti Stadium

8	Fajr Sepasi	0 – 0	Esteghlal

14 December 1997 9	Esteghlal	2 – 0	Saipa	Tehran
				Stadium: Azadi Stadium

26 November 1997 10	Esteghlal	1 – 0	Zob Ahan	Tehran
				Stadium: Azadi Stadium

21 December 1997 11	Tractor Sazi	0 – 0	Esteghlal	Tabriz
				Stadium: Takhti Stadium

30 December 1997 12	Sanat Naft	1 – 1	Esteghlal	Abadan
				Stadium: Takhti Stadium

8 January 1998 13	Esteghlal	2 – 2	Bahman	Tehran
				Stadium: Azadi Stadium

16 January 1998 14	Esteghlal	2 – 1	Sepahan	Tehran
				Stadium: Azadi Stadium

23 January 1998 15	Esteghlal Ahvaz	1 – 2	Esteghlal	Ahvaz
				Stadium: Takhti Stadium

5 February 1998 16	Esteghlal	1 – 0	Polyacryl	Tehran
				Stadium: Azadi Stadium

21 July 1998 17	Esteghlal	1 – 1	PAS	Tehran
				Stadium: Azadi Stadium

30 January 1998 18	Payam Mashhad	1 – 2	Esteghlal	Mashhad
				Stadium: Takhti Stadium

8 February 1998 19	Esteghlal	1 – 0	Bargh Shiraz	Tehran
				Stadium: Azadi Stadium

26 July 1998 20	Foolad	1 – 0	Esteghlal	Ahvaz
				Stadium: Takhti Stadium

27 February 1998 21	Esteghlal	3 – 1	Shahrdari Tabriz	Tehran
				Stadium: Azadi Stadium

12 July 1998 22	Esteghlal	3 – 2	Fajr Sepasi	Tehran
				Stadium: Azadi Stadium

5 March 1998 23	Saipa	0 – 0	Esteghlal	Tehran
				Stadium: Azadi Stadium

9 August 1998 24	Zob Ahan	2 – 0	Esteghlal	Isfahan
				Stadium: 22 Bahman Stadium

4 August 1998 25	Esteghlal	5 – 1	Tractor Sazi	Tehran
				Stadium: Azadi Stadium

31 July 1998 26	Esteghlal	2 – 2	Sanat Naft	Tehran
				Stadium: Azadi Stadium

18 August 1998 27	Bahman	1 – 2	Esteghlal	Tehran
				Stadium: Azadi Stadium

17 July 1998 28	Sepahan	0 – 1	Esteghlal	Isfahan
				Stadium: 22 Bahman Stadium

=== Caspian Cup ===
15 July 1997 1	Esteghlal (Iran)	0 – 1	(Azerbaijan) Kapaz	Rasht
		Report	Ashiq Jabbarov 60'	Stadium: Shahid Dr. Azodi Stadium

18 July 1997 2	Chooka Talesh (Iran)	1 – 5	(Iran) Esteghlal	Rasht
	Hossein Hajalizadeh	Report	Samad Marfavi (pen.) (pen.); Mohsen Garousi	Stadium: Shahid Dr. Azodi Stadium

21 July 1997 3	Sepidrood Rasht (Iran)	0 – 0	(Iran) Esteghlal	Rasht
				Stadium: Shahid Dr. Azodi Stadium

23 July 1997 Semifinal	Esteghlal Rasht (Iran)	1 – 2	(Iran) Esteghlal	Rasht
			Samad Marfavi (pen.); Mohammad Reza Mehranpour	Stadium: Shahid Dr. Azodi Stadium

25 July 1997 Final	Esteghlal (Iran)	2 – 0	(Iran) Chooka Talesh	Rasht
	Farhad Majidi 41', 81'	Report		Stadium: Shahid Dr. Azodi Stadium

=== Turkmenistan President's Cup ===
11 February 1998 1	Esteghlal (Iran)	3 – 1	(Armenia) Ararat Yerevan	Ashgabat, Turkmenistan
	Mohsen Garousi 75'; Mehdi Pashazadeh 80'; Samad Marfavi 90'	Report	43'

27 February 1999 2	Esteghlal (Iran)	1 – 0	(China) Liaoning	Ashgabat, Turkmenistan
	Edmond Akhtar 22'	Report

1 March 1999 3	Nisa Aşgabat (Turkmenistan)	1 – 1	(Iran) Esteghlal	Ashgabat, Turkmenistan
		Report	Edmond Akhtar

28 April 1999 Semifinals	Ulsan Hyundai (South Korea)	0 – 1	(Iran) Esteghlal	Ashgabat, Turkmenistan
		Report	Mohammad Khorramgah 75'	Stadium: Azadi Stadium

19 February 1998 Final	Zenit St. Petersburg (Russia)	0 – 0 (a.e.t.) (6 – 7 p)	(Iran) Esteghlal	Ashgabat, Turkmenistan
		Report		Stadium: Köpetdag Stadium
	Penalties
	Penalty scored Penalty missed		(penalty scored) Samad Marfavi; (penalty missed) Mohammad Khorramgah; (penalty scored) Fred Malekian; (penalty scored) Javad Zarincheh; (penalty scored) Mehdi Pashazadeh; (penalty scored) Reza Hassanzadeh; (penalty scored) Serjik Teymourian; (penalty missed) Parviz Boroumand; (penalty scored) Mohammad Nouri

== See also ==
- 1997–98 Azadegan League
