= List of Esteghlal F.C. players =

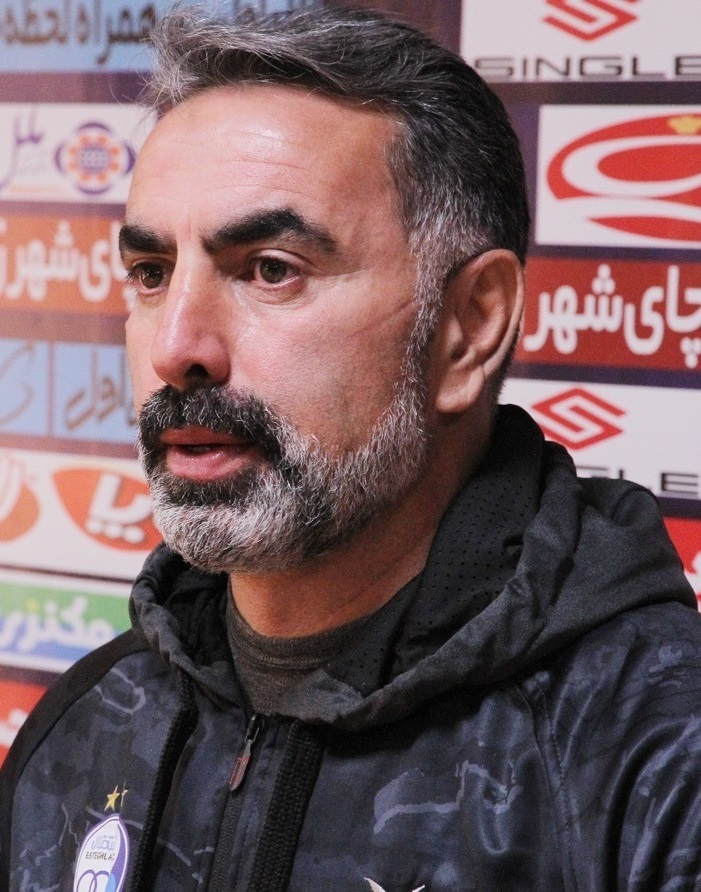
Mahmoud Fekri lies first in the all-time appearance list with 345.

This is a list of players who have played for Esteghlal Football Club.

== Key ==
- The list is ordered first by date of debut, and then if necessary in alphabetical order.
- Statistics are correct up to and including the match played on 14 February 2021. Where a player left the club permanently after this date, his statistics are updated to his date of leaving.
- Players highlighted in **bold** are still actively playing at Esteghlal.

Position
Playing positions are listed according to the tactical formations that were employed at the time.
Club career
Club career is defined as the first and last calendar years in which the player appeared for the club in any of the competitions listed below.
Total appearances and Total goals
Total appearances and goals comprise those in the Iran championship Tournament, Iran Local League, Takht Jamshid Cup, Qods League, Azadegan League, Iran Pro League, Tehran Football League, Hazfi Cup, Tehran Hazfi Cup, AFC Champions League, Asian Cup Winners' Cup, and Iranian Super Cup.

== World Cup Players ==
**(Argentina) 1978 FIFA World Cup**

- (Iran) Iraj Danaeifard
- (Iran) Andranik Eskandarian
- (Iran) Hassan Nazari
- (Iran) Hassan Rowshan

**(France) 1998 FIFA World Cup**

- (Iran) Parviz Boroumand
- (Iran) Alireza Mansourian
- (Iran) Mehdi Pashazadeh
- (Iran) Javad Zarincheh

**(Germany) 2006 FIFA World Cup**

- (Iran) Reza Enayati
- (Iran) Amir Hossein Sadeghi
- (Iran) Vahid Talebloo

**(Brazil) 2014 FIFA World Cup**

- (Iran) Khosro Heydari
- (Iran) Amir Hossein Sadeghi
- (Iran) Andranik Teymourian
- (Iran) Hashem Beikzadeh

**(Russia) 2018 FIFA World Cup**

- (Iran) Rouzbeh Cheshmi
- (Iran) Omid Ebrahimi
- (Iran) Pejman Montazeri
- (Iran) Majid Hosseini

**(Qatar) 2022 FIFA World Cup**

- (Iran) Hossein Hosseini
- (Iran) Rouzbeh Cheshmi
- (Iran) Abolfazl Jalali

**(Canada) (Mexico) (United States) 2026 FIFA World Cup**

- (Iran) Rouzbeh Cheshmi
- (Iran) Saleh Hardani
- (Iran) Amirmohammad Razzaghinia
- (Haiti) Duckens Nazon
- (Uzbekistan) Rustam Ashurmatov
- (Uzbekistan) Jaloliddin Masharipov

== Olympic Players ==
(West Germany) **1972 Summer Olympics**

- (Iran) Ali Jabbari
- (Iran) Mansour Rashidi
- (Iran) Javad Ghorab
- (Iran) Javad Allahverdi

(Canada) **1976 Summer Olympics**

- (Iran) Mansour Rashidi
- (Iran) Hassan Nazari
- (Iran) Andranik Eskandarian
- (Iran) Hassan Rowshan
- (Iran) Nasser Hejazi

== List of players ==
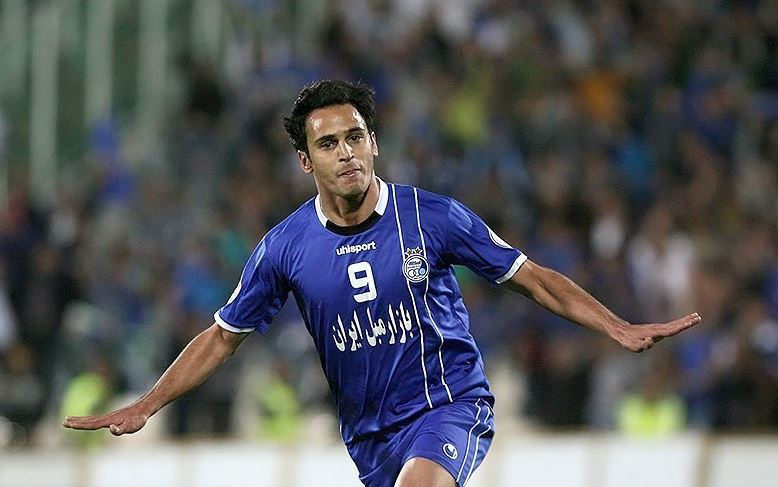
Arash Borhani is Esteghlal's first-highest all-time goalscorer.

List of Esteghlal F.C players with 100 or more appearances
Name	Pos	Club career	Appearances	Goals
Ali Jabbari	Midfielder	1965–1975	183	92
Karo Haghverdian	Midfielder	1968–1976	176	8
Nasser Hejazi	Goalkeeper	1968–1975; 1980–1986	152	0
Ezatollah Janmaleki	Defender	1968–1976	166	3
Mansour Pourheidari	Defender	1968–1975	141	2
Javad Ghorab	Midfielder	1969–1976	144	23
Gholam Hossein Mazloumi	Forward	1969–1975	140	81
Akbar Kargarjam	Defender	1969–1976	160	1
Masoud Mojdehi	Forward	1970–1977	136	37
Abbas Nouvinrozegar	Midfielder	1972–1977	110	5
Hassan Rowshan	Forward	1972–1978; 1982–1983	130	32
Parviz Mazloumi	Forward	1973–1975; 1978–1988	144	65
Hadi Naraghi	Forward	1973–1979	110	31
Saeid Maragehchian	Midfielder	1975–1986	152	4
Asghar Hajiloo	Defender	1976–1988	134	3
Reza Naalchegar	Midfielder	1977–1984; 1986–1987; 1990–1991	108	10
Shahin Bayani	Defender	1978–1986; 1989–1994	175	1
Shahrokh Bayani	Midfielder	1978–1985; 1989–1993	141	26
Reza Ahadi	Midfielder	1981–1986; 1987–1992	10	12
Abdolali Changiz	Forward	1981–1986; 1990–1992	129	47
Jafar Mokhtarifar	Forward	1983–1987; 1989–1991	125	31
Majid Namjoo-Motlagh	Midfielder	1984–1990; 1991–1992	100	15
Sadegh Varmazyar	Defender	1984–1997	271	16
Javad Zarincheh	Defender	1987–1991; 1993–2003	305	2
Farshad Falahatzadeh	Defender	1988–1991	147	2
Reza Hassanzadeh	Defender	1988–1995; 1996–2000	214	17
Abbas Sarkhab	Forward	1988–1996	141	41
Amir Ghalenoei	Midfielder	1989–1997	156	25
Samad Marfavi	Forward	1989–1993; 1996–1998	169	79
Hamid Babazadeh	Goalkeeper	1990–1997	105	0
Iman Alami	Midfielder	1991–1996	111	14
Mahmoud Fekri	Defender	1992–1996; 1998–2007	345	22
Mehdi Pashazadeh	Defender	1992–1998; 2000–2003	182	12
Mohammadreza Mehranpour	Midfielder	1993–1998	110	12
Mohammad Nouri	Defender	1993–1998	107	2
Mohammad Taghavi	Defender	1993–2000	121	4
Mohammad Khorramgah	Defender	1994–2003	155	1
Alireza Mansourian	Midfielder	1995–1996; 1997–1998; 2002–2008	226	24
Alireza Akbarpour	Forward	1996–2006	219	33
Farhad Majidi	Forward	1997–1999; 2007–2011; 2012–2013	256	94
Sohrab Bakhtiarizadeh	Defender	1998–2000; 2001–2003	115	3
Sirous Dinmohammadi	Midfielder	1998–1999; 2000–2003	132	24
Mohammad Navazi	Midfielder	1998–2004; 2006–2008	191	29
Ahmad Momenzadeh	Forward	1999–2003	102	16
Alireza Vahedi Nikbakht	Midfielder	1999–2006; 2013–2014	199	33
Pirouz Ghorbani	Defender	2000–2009	195	13
Farzad Majidi	Midfielder	2000–2007	173	22
Ali Samereh	Forward	2000–2005	105	42
Yadollah Akbari	Midfielder	2001–2004; 2008–2009	125	18
Amir Hossein Sadeghi	Defender	2002–2008; 2009–2011; 2012–2015	316	16
Reza Enayati	Forward	2003–2006; 2009–2010; 2014–2015	120	64
Vahid Talebloo	Goalkeeper	2003–2011; 2015–2016	191	0
Siavash Akbarpour	Forward	2004–2007; 2008–2010; 2012–2014	212	46
Mehdi Amirabadi	Defender	2004–2012	202	5
Hossein Kazemi	Midfielder	2004–2007; 2008–2010	146	18
Mojtaba Jabbari	Midfielder	2005–2013; 2017	177	33
Mehdi Rahmati	Goalkeeper	2005–2007; 2011–2014; 2015–2019	265	0
Mohsen Yousefi	Midfielder	2006–2008; 2009–2012	110	8
Arash Borhani	Forward	2007–2016	292	107
Pejman Montazeri	Defender	2007–2014; 2017–2019	318	17
Hashem Beikzadeh	Defender	2008–2010; 2012–2015	127	4
Khosro Heydari	Midfielder	2008–2010; 2011–2019	304	8
Hanif Omranzadeh	Defender	2008–2016	220	22
Omid Ebrahimi	Midfielder	2014–2018	134	30
Rouzbeh Cheshmi	Defender	2015–2020	119	5
**Farshid Esmaeili**	Midfielder	2015–2021	142	16
**Farshid Bagheri**	Midfielder	2016–2021	103	6
**Vouria Ghafouri**	Defender	2016–2022	121	18

== List of goalscorers ==
Name	Nat	Position^{[NB]}	Esteghlal career	Goals	Notes
Siavash Akbarpour	(Iran)	Second striker	2004–2007, 2008–2010, 2012–2014	46	
Alireza Akbarpour	(Iran)	Midfielder	1998-2006	22	Retired
Ali Mousavi	(Iran)	Forward	1998-1999, 2000-2003	22	Retired
Ahmad Momenzadeh	(Iran)	Forward	1999–2003	17	
Ali Alizadeh	(Iran)	Forward	2006-2009	10	
Alireza Mansourian	(Iran)	Midfielder	2002–2008	9	Retired
Mehdi Amirabadi	(Iran)	Right back	2004–2012	5	
Ali Ansarian	(Iran)	Defender	2006–2007	4	Retired
Alireza Abbasfard	(Iran)	Forward	2008-2009	4	
Farzad Ashoubi	(Iran)	Midfielder	2010-2011	4	
Ali Latifi	(Iran)	Centre forward	1998-2000	13	Retired
Ali Samereh	(Iran)	Striker	2000–2005	41	
Alireza Vahedi Nikbakht	(Iran)	Midfielder	1999–2006, 2013–2014	31	
Amir Hossein Sadeghi	(Iran)	Defender	2003–2008, 2009–2011, 2012–2015	14	
Arash Borhani	(Iran)	Forward	2007–2016	107	
Behzad Dadashzadeh	(Iran)	Midfielder	1999-2002	4	Retired
Farhad Majidi	(Iran)	Forward	1998-2000, 2007–2013	89	Retired
Reza Enayati	(Iran)	Centre forward	2003–2006, 2009-2010	59	
Mojtaba Jabbari	(Iran)	Attacking midfielder	2005–2013	32	
Mohammad Navazi	(Iran)	Right midfielder	1998-2004, 2006-2008	30	Retired
Faraz Fatemi	(Iran)	Centre forward	2001–2004	27	
Sirous Dinmohammadi	(Iran)	Midfielder	1998-1999, 2000–2003	24	Retired
Farzad Majidi	(Iran)	Midfielder	2000–2007	22	Retired
Mehdi Seyed Salehi	(Iran)	Striker	2009-2011	20	
Hossein Kazemi	(Iran)	Defensive midfielder	2004–2007, 2008–2010	18	
Yadollah Akbari	(Iran)	Midfielder	2001-2004, 2008-2009	18	Retired
Milad Meydavoudi	(Iran)	Striker, Winger	2010–2013	17	
Hanif Omranzadeh	(Iran)	Defender	2008–2016	19	
Mehdi Hasheminasab	(Iran)	Defender	2000–2003	14	Retired
Pejman Montazeri	(Iran)	Defender	2007–2013	15	
Pirouz Ghorbani	(Iran)	Defender	2001-2009	14	
Mahmoud Fekri	(Iran)	Defender	1998-2007	14	Retired
Javad Nekounam	(Iran)	Midfielder	2012–2014	12	
Fred Malekian	(Iran)	Forward	1998-2000, 2004–2005	11	Retired
Mehrdad Oladi	(Iran)	Forward	2013–2014	2	
Farzad Hatami	(Iran)	Striker	2013	10	
Goran Jerković	(France)	Striker	2012	9	
Jlloyd Samuel	(Trinidad and Tobago)	Defender, Midfielder	2011–2014	10	
Dariush Yazdani	(Iran)	Midfielder	1998-2001	9	Retired
Mohsen Yousefi	(Iran)	Midfielder	2006-2008, 2009-2012	8	
Fabio Januario	(Brazil)	Midfielder	2008-2010, 2012-2013	8	Retired
Maysam Baou	(Iran)	Attacking midfielder	2004–2007, 2012–2013	8	
Esmaeil Sharifat	(Iran)	Forward, Winger	2010-2012	7	
Sattar Hamedani	(Iran)	Midfielder	1999-2001, 2002–2004	7	
Omid Ravankhah	(Iran)	Midfielder	2007-2011	7	Retired
Khosro Heydari	(Iran)	Right-back, Right-midfielder	2008–2010, 2011–2019	8	
Mojahed Khaziravi	(Iran)	Right winger	2000–2002, 2004-2005	6	
Meysam Maniei	(Iran)	Midfielder	2007-2009	5	
Bahman Tahmasebi	(Iran)	Forward	1999-2001	5	
Ferydoon Zandi	(Iran)	Midfielder	2011-2012	5	
Hadi Shakouri	(Iran)	Defender	2008-2011	5	
Hawar Mulla Mohammed	(Iraq)	Side midfielder	2012	4	
Mohammad Ghazi	(Iran)	Striker	2013–2015	16	
Rufat Guliev	(Azerbaijan)	Midfielder	2000–2002	4	
Davoud Seyed Abbasi	(Iran)	Midfielder	2001–2002, 2003-2004	4	
Andranik Teymourian	(Iran)	Midfielder	2011–2012, 2013–present	3	
Vicente Arze	(Bolivia)	Midfielder	2012–2013	3	
Milad Nouri	(Iran)	Center midfielder	2008–2010	3	
Mehdi Salehpoor	(Iran)	Forward	2000–2001	3	Retired
Hashem Heydari	(Iran)	Forward	1998-1999	3	Retired
Joílson Rodrigues da Silva	(Brazil)	Striker	2006-2007	3	
Rinaldo Cruzado	(Peru)	Midfielder	2009–2010	2	
Iman Mousavi	(Iran)	Forward	2013	2	
Mehdi Pashazadeh	(Iran)	Defender	2001–2003	2	Retired
Meysam Hosseini	(Iran)	Defender	2011–2022	2	
Roger Fabritcio	(Brazil)	Forward	2003–2004	2	
Mohammad Momeni	(Iran)	Forward	1998-1999	2	
Asghar Talebnasab	(Iran)	Midfielder	2005–2007	2	Retired
Rodrigo Tosi	(Brazil)	Midfielder	2012–2013	2	
Ahmad Khaziravi	(Iran)	Striker	2007-2009	2	Retired
Sohrab Bakhtiarizadeh	(Iran)	Defender	1998–1999, 2001-2003	3	
Hashem Beikzadeh	(Iran)	Left back, Midfielder	2008–2010, 2012–present	3	
Akvsenti Gilauri	(Georgia (country))	Defender	2004–2007	2	
Amin Manouchehri	(Iran)	Forward	2012-2013	1	
Attila Hejazi	(Iran)	Forward	1998-1999	1	Retired
Kianoush Rahmati	(Iran)	Defensive midfielder	2012-2013	1	
Rasoul Khatibi	(Iran)	Forward	2003	1	Retired
Mohammad Mehdi Nazari	(Iran)	Forward	2013–2014	1	
Waleed Ali	(Kuwait)	Midfielder	2011	1	
Hassan Ashjari	(Iran)	Defender	2012–2013	1	
Afshin Hajipour	(Iran)	?	1999-2000	1	Retired
Mehrdad Pouladi	(Iran)	Midfielder, Left back	2007–2009	1	
Srđan Urošević	(Serbia)	Defensive midfielder	2007-2008	1	
Hamid Shafiei	(Iran)	Forward	2007-2008	1	
Saeid Bayat	(Iran)	Midfielder	2007–2008	1	
Shahin Kheiri	(Iran)	Midfielder	2004–2006	1	
Morteza Hashemizadeh	(Iran)	Forward	2006–2007	1	Retired
Saeed Lotfi	(Iran)	Defender	2003–2008	1	Retired
Keivan Sajedi	(Iran)	Midfielder	2003–2004	1	Retired
Mojtaba Mahboub-Mojaz	(Iran)	Striker	2009–2012	1	
Kazem Mahmoudi	(Iran)	Defender	1999-2000	1	Retired
Arastou Mohmmadi	(Iran)	Defender	1999-2002	1	Retired
Saeid Beigi	(Iran)	Defender	2000-2001	1	Retired
Ali Hamoudi	(Iran)	Right back	2011-2013	1	
Javad Shirzad	(Iran)	Left back	2011-2012	1	
Ali Chini	(Iran)	Midfielder	1998-2000	1	Retired
Adel Hardani	(Iran)	?	1998-1999	1	Retired
Mohammad Taghavi	(Iran)	Defender	1998-1999	1	Retired
