= 1996–97 Esteghlal F.C. season =

Esteghlal F.C.
1996–97 season
- President: Ali Fathollahzadeh
- Head coach: Nasser Hejazi
- Stadium: Azadi Stadium
- Azadegan League: 6th
- Hazfi Cup: Quarterfinal
- Asian Club Championship: 4th
- Top goalscorer: Samad Marfavi (13)
Home colours	Away colours

The 1996–97 season was the Esteghlal Football Club's 5th season in the Azadegan League, and their 3rd consecutive season in the top division of Iranian football. They are also competing in the Caspian Cup and Turkmenistan President's Cup, and 52nd year in existence as a football club.

== Player ==
As of 1 September 2018.

Note: Flags indicate national team as defined under FIFA eligibility rules; some limited exceptions apply. Players may hold more than one non-FIFA nationality.

No.	Pos.	Nation	Player
1	GK	(Iran) IRN	Behzad Gholampour
2	MF	(Iran) IRN	Masoud Ghafourihaye-Asl
3	DF	(Iran) IRN	Sadegh Varmazyar
4	DF	(Iran) IRN	Mehdi Pashazadeh
5	DF	(Iran) IRN	Javad Zarincheh
8	MF	(Iran) IRN	Amir Ghalenoei
9	FW	(Iran) IRN	Samad Marfavi
10	MF	(Iran) IRN	Alireza Mansourian
11	FW	(Iran) IRN	Ali Akarian
12	FW	(Iran) IRN	Edmond Akhtar
14	DF	(Iran) IRN	Mohammad Nouri
15	DF	(Iran) IRN	Dariush Yazdi
16	MF	(Iran) IRN	Ali Hajakbari
17	MF	(Iran) IRN	Attila Hejazi
18	DF	(Iran) IRN	Davoud Hosseini

No.	Pos.	Nation	Player
19	MF	(Iran) IRN	Serjik Teymourian
20	MF	(Iran) IRN	Mohammad Taghavi
22	MF	(Iran) IRN	Mohammad Reza Mehranpour
23	MF	(Iran) IRN	Behrouz Parvareshkhah
24	DF	(Iran) IRN	Mohammad Khorramgah
25	MF	(Iran) IRN	Javid Shokri
—	GK	(Iran) IRN	Mohammad Ali Yahyavi
—	GK	(Iran) IRN	Nima Kheyrandish
—	DF	(Iran) IRN	Reza Hassanzadeh
—	MF	(Iran) IRN	Ghasem Keshavarz
—	MF	(Iran) IRN	Mehrdad Amin-Shirazi
—	MF	(Iran) IRN	Hashem Heydari
—	FW	(Iran) IRN	Alireza Akbarpour
—	FW	(Iran) IRN	Fred Malekian

== Pre-season and friendlies ==
27 January 1997 1	Esteghlal	2 – 1	Bank Melli	Tehran
				Stadium: Marghoubkar Stadium

8 March 1997 2	Aboomoslem	0 – 0	Esteghlal	Mashhad
				Stadium: Takhti Stadium

10 March 1997 3	Payam Khorasan	1 – 0	Esteghlal	Mashhad
				Stadium: Takhti Stadium

=== Sedaghat Cup ===
23 April 1997 1	Al-Hilal (Sudan)	1 – 3	(Iran) Esteghlal	Dubai, United Arab Emirates
				Stadium: Al-Maktoum Stadium

25 April 1997 2	Esteghlal (Iran)	1 – 2	(Egypt) El-Mansoura	Dubai, United Arab Emirates
				Stadium: Al-Maktoum Stadium

27 April 1997 3	Al-Ahli (United Arab Emirates)	3 – 4	(Iran) Esteghlal	Dubai, United Arab Emirates
				Stadium: Al-Maktoum Stadium

=== Naghsh-e Jahan Cup ===
1	Zob Ahan (Iran)	1 – 1	(Iran) Esteghlal	Isfahan

2	Polyacryl (Iran)	0 – 1	(Iran) Esteghlal	Isfahan

3	Esteghlal (Iran)	2 – 1	(Turkmenistan) Turan	Isfahan

Semifinal	Sepahan (Iran)	1 – 0	(Iran) Esteghlal	Isfahan

Play-off	Polyacryl (Iran)	1 – 1 (a.e.t.) (4 – 3 p)	(Iran) Esteghlal	Isfahan

== Competitions ==
=== Overview ===
Competition	Started round	Current position / round	Final position / round	First match	Last match
Azadegan League	—	—	6th	1 July 1996	11 July 1997
Hazfi Cup	Round of 32	—	Quarterfinal	14 June 1996	15 August 1997
Asian Cup Winners' Cup	—	—	4th		26 November 1996

Updated to match played 13 October 2018
Source: Competitions

=== Azadegan League ===
==== Standings ====
Pos	Team	Pld	W	D	L	GF	GA	GD	Pts	Qualification or relegation
4	PAS Tehran	30	11	15	4	37	22	+15	48	
5	Sanat Naft	30	11	9	10	37	38	−1	42	
6	Esteghlal	30	11	8	11	42	39	+3	41	
7	Payam Mashhad	30	9	13	8	37	37	0	40	
8	Bargh Shiraz	30	11	6	13	26	27	−1	39	Qualification for the 1997–98 Asian Cup Winners Cup

Source: RSSSF

=== Hazfi Cup ===
==== Round of 32 ====
14 June 1996 First leg	Fajr Sepah Urmia	0 – 2	Esteghlal	Urmia

21 June 1996 Second leg	Esteghlal	1 – 1 (3 – 1 agg.)	Fajr Sepah Urmia	Tehran
				Stadium: Azadi Stadium

==== Round of 16 ====
2 February 1997 First leg	Machine Sazi	0 – 0	Esteghlal	Tabriz
				Stadium: Takhti Stadium

18 February 1997 Second leg	Esteghlal	3 – 0 (3 – 0 agg.)	Machine Sazi	Tehran
				Stadium: Azadi Stadium

==== Quarterfinal ====
15 August 1997 Quarterfinal	Bahman	1 – 0	Esteghlal	Tehran
				Stadium: Azadi Stadium

=== Asian Cup Winners' Cup ===
==== Second round ====
First leg	Navbahor Namangan (Uzbekistan)	4 – 1	(Iran) Esteghlal	Namangan, Uzbekistan
				Stadium: Markaziy Stadium

Second leg	Esteghlal (Iran)	3 – 0 (4 – 4 agg.)	(Uzbekistan) Navbahor Namangan	Tehran, Iran
				Stadium: Azadi Stadium
Note: Away goals rule

==== Quarterfinal ====
First leg	Ordabasy-SKIF Chimkent (Kazakhstan)	0 – 1	(Iran) Esteghlal	Shymkent, Kazakhstan
				Stadium: Kazhymukan Munaitpasov Stadium

12 November 1996 Second leg	Esteghlal (Iran)	1 – 1 (2 – 1 agg.)	(Kazakhstan) Ordabasy-SKIF Chimkent	Tehran, Iran
				Stadium: Azadi Stadium

==== Semifinals ====
24 November 1996 Semifinals	Al Hilal (Saudi Arabia)	0 – 0 (a.e.t.) (5 – 4 p)	(Iran) Esteghlal	Riyadh, Saudi Arabia

==== Play-off ====
26 November 1996 Play-off	Ulsan Hyundai (South Korea)	1 – 0	(Iran) Esteghlal	Riyadh, Saudi Arabia
	Kim Ki-Nam 7'

== See also ==
- 1996–97 Azadegan League
