= 1995–96 Esteghlal F.C. season =

Esteghlal F.C.
1995–96 season
- President: Kazem Oliaei
- Head coach: Mansour Pourheidari
- Stadium: Azadi Stadium
- Azadegan League: 3rd
- Hazfi Cup: Winners
- Top goalscorer: Edmond Akhtar (11)
Home colours	Away colours

The 1995–96 season was the Esteghlal Football Club's 4th season in the Azadegan League, and their 2nd consecutive season in the top division of Iranian football. They are also competing in the Hazfi Cup and Asian Club Championship, and 51st year in existence as a football club.

== Player ==
As of 29 September 2018.

Note: Flags indicate national team as defined under FIFA eligibility rules; some limited exceptions apply. Players may hold more than one non-FIFA nationality.

No.	Pos.	Nation	Player
1	GK	(Iran) IRN	Hamid Babazadeh
2	DF	(Iran) IRN	Masoud Ghafourihaye-Asl
3	DF	(Iran) IRN	Sadegh Varmazyar
4	DF	(Iran) IRN	Mehdi Pashazadeh
5	DF	(Iran) IRN	Javad Zarincheh
6	MF	(Iran) IRN	Mahmoud Fekri
7	MF	(Iran) IRN	Kourosh Tashtzar
8	MF	(Iran) IRN	Amir Ghalenoei
9	FW	(Iran) IRN	Abbas Sarkhab
10	MF	(Iran) IRN	Iman Alami
11	FW	(Iran) IRN	Ali Akarian
12	FW	(Iran) IRN	Edmond Akhtar
13	DF	(Iran) IRN	Davoud Mahabadi

No.	Pos.	Nation	Player
14	DF	(Iran) IRN	Mohammad Nouri
15	MF	(Iran) IRN	Ghasem Sianaki
16	MF	(Iran) IRN	Ali Hajakbari
17	DF	(Iran) IRN	Alireza Mansourian
18	MF	(Iran) IRN	Seyed Jalal Pourmousa
19	MF	(Iran) IRN	Serjik Teymourian
20	MF	(Iran) IRN	Mohammad Taghavi
21	MF	(Iran) IRN	Kamyar Kardar
22	MF	(Iran) IRN	Mohammad Reza Mehranpour
23	MF	(Iran) IRN	Behrouz Parvareshkhah
24	DF	(Iran) IRN	Mohammad Khorramgah
—	GK	(Iran) IRN	Mohammad Ali Yahyavi
—	MF	(Iran) IRN	Nasser Abbasi
—		(Iran) IRN	Jaures Ghazaryan

== Pre-season and friendlies ==
Esteghlal (Iran)	2 – 1	Singapore	Tehran, Iran
Behrouz Parvareshkhah; Ali Akarian			Stadium: Azadi Stadium
Note: In this match Shahin Bayani Goodbyed from football.

== Competitions ==
=== Overview ===
Competition	Started round	Current position / round	Final position / round	First match	Last match
Azadegan League	—	—	3rd	18 May 1995	
Hazfi Cup	1/8 finals	—	Winners	8 August 1995	8 July 1996

Updated to match played 20 October 2018
Source: Competitions

=== Azadegan League ===
==== Standings ====
Pos	Team	Pld	W	D	L	GF	GA	GD	Pts	Qualification or relegation
1	Persepolis (C)	30	15	12	3	33	18	+15	57	Qualification for the 1996–97 Asian Club Championship
2	Bahman	30	13	12	5	47	24	+23	51	
3	Esteghlal	30	14	9	7	41	26	+15	51	Qualification for the 1996–97 Asian Cup Winners' Cup
4	PAS	30	13	6	11	33	35	−2	45	
5	Sepahan	30	11	9	10	40	34	+6	42	

Updated to match(es) played on 1 September 2018. Source: RSSSF
Rules for classification: 1) Points; 2) Goal difference; 3) Goals scored.
(C) Champions

=== Hazfi Cup ===
==== Round of 16 ====
8 August 1995 First leg	Basij Tabriz	0 – 1	Esteghlal	Tabriz
			Ali Akarian	Stadium: Takhti Stadium

9 February 1995 Second leg	Esteghlal	4 – 2 (5 – 2 agg.)	Basij Tabriz	Tehran
	Kamyar Kardar; Sadegh Varmazyar pen.' Abbas Sarkhab			Stadium: Azadi Stadium

==== 1/8 finals ====
1/8 finals	Esteghlal	3 – 0	Pars Khodro Tehran	Tehran
	Abbas Sarkhab; Mahmoud Fekri; Alireza Mansourian			Stadium: Azadi Stadium

==== Quarterfinals ====
Quarterfinals	Keshavarz	1 – 2	Esteghlal
	Fred Malekian

==== Semifinal ====
First leg	Esteghlal	1 – 0	Malavan

Second leg	Malavan	1 – 1 (1 – 2 agg.)	Esteghlal

==== Final ====
28 June 1996 First leg	Bargh Shiraz	1 – 3	Esteghlal	Shiraz
			Samad Marfavi; Alireza Mansourian	Stadium: Shohadaye Artesh Stadium

8 July 1996 Second leg	Esteghlal	2 – 0 (5 – 1 agg.)	Bargh Shiraz	Tehran
	Amir Ghalenoei			Stadium: Azadi Stadium

== See also ==
- 1995–96 Azadegan League
- 1995–96 Hazfi Cup
