= 1994–95 Esteghlal F.C. season =

Esteghlal F.C.
1994–95 season
- President: Kazem Oliaei
- Head coach: Reza Naalchegar; Leonid Terry Bilofsky; Nasrollah Abdollahi
- Stadium: Azadi Stadium
- Azadegan League: 2nd
- Hazfi Cup: Round of 16
- Top goalscorer: Edmond Akhtar (11)
Home colours	Away colours

The 1994–95 season was the Esteghlal Football Club's 3rd season in the Azadegan League, and their 1st season in the top division of Iranian football after promotion. Esteghlal was also competing in the Hazfi Cup, and it was its 50th year in existence as a football club.

== Player ==
As of 29 September 2018.

Note: Flags indicate national team as defined under FIFA eligibility rules; some limited exceptions apply. Players may hold more than one non-FIFA nationality.

No.	Pos.	Nation	Player
—	GK	IRN	Hamid Babazadeh
—	GK	IRN	Behzad Gholampour
—	GK	IRN	Hossein Torabpour
—	DF	IRN	Javad Zarincheh
—	MF	IRN	Ghasem Sianaki
—	FW	IRN	Jafar Mokhtarifar
—	DF	IRN	Shahin Bayani
—	MF	IRN	Iman Alami
—	FW	IRN	Abbas Sarkhab
—	MF	IRN	Mahmoud Fekri
—	MF	IRN	Mohammad Reza Mehranpour
—	MF	IRN	Ali Hajakbari
—	MF	IRN	Ghasem Keshavarz
—	DF	IRN	Mohammad Nouri

No.	Pos.	Nation	Player
—	MF	IRN	Kourosh Tashtzar
—	MF	IRN	Jamshid Amirkhanlou
—		IRN	Jaures Ghazaryan
—	MF	IRN	Amir Ghalenoei
—	DF	IRN	Masoud Ghafourihaye-Asl
—	FW	IRN	Ali Akarian
—	FW	IRN	Edmond Akhtar
—	MF	IRN	Mohammad Taghavi
—	DF	IRN	Sadegh Varmazyar
—	DF	IRN	Mehdi Pashazadeh
—	MF	IRN	Serjik Teymourian
—	DF	IRN	Mohammad Khorramgah
—	DF	IRN	Farshad Falahatzadeh

== Pre-season and friendlies ==
April 1994	Esteghlal	3 – 2	Fath Tehran F.C.	Tehran
				Stadium: Azadi Stadium

28 October 1994	Esteghlal (Iran)	2 – 1	(Romania) Steaua București	Tehran, Iran
	Ghasem Keshavarz 35'; Edmond Akhtar 70'		Adrian Ilie 1'	Stadium: Azadi Stadium; Referee: Yadollah Soleimani

=== Emirates Vahdat Cup ===
28 October 1994 1	Al-Ahli (United Arab Emirates)	1 – 0	(Iran) Esteghlal	United Arab Emirates

30 October 1994 2	Al-Nasr (United Arab Emirates)	1 – 0	(Iran) Esteghlal	United Arab Emirates

1 November 1994 3	Iran U23	2 – 2	(Iran) Esteghlal	United Arab Emirates

Pos	Team	Pld	W	D	L	GF	GA	GD	Pts	Qualification or relegation
1	Iran U23	3	1	2	0	5	3	+2	5	Champion
2	(United Arab Emirates) Al-Ahli	3	1	2	0	1	0	+1	5	
3	(United Arab Emirates) Al-Nasr	3	1	1	1	2	3	−1	4	
4	(Iran) Esteghlal	3	0	1	2	2	4	−2	1	

Source: Competitions

== Competitions ==
=== Overview ===
Competition	Started round	Current position / round	Final position / round	First match	Last match
Azadegan League	—	—	2nd	10 June 1994	31 January 1995
Hazfi Cup	Round of 64	—	Round of 16	8 September 1994	26 September 1994

Updated to match played 20 October 2018
Source: Competitions

=== Azadegan League ===
==== Standings ====
Group A

	Team	GP	W	D	L	GF	GA	Pts	Qualification or relegation
1	Saipa	22	11	7	4	30	16	29	Promoted to Semi-Final
2	Esteghlal	22	10	7	5	25	20	27	Promoted to Semi-Final
3	Machine Sazi	22	9	7	6	27	21	25	
4	Shahrdari Tabriz	22	7	10	5	26	22	24	

==== Semi-final ====
20 January 1995 First leg	Persepolis	2 (0) – (3) 2	Esteghlal	Tehran
	Pious 51', Dadashzadeh 56'		Varmazyar 79', Akhtar 87'	Stadium: Azadi Stadium; Attendance: 100,000; Referee: Ahmad Abharan (Iran)
Note: The original match was 2–2 until 88' when Persepolis fans stormed into the ground. Football Federation awarded the match 3–0 for Esteghlal.

27 January 1995 Second leg	Esteghlal	0 – 0 (3 – 0 agg.)	Persepolis	Bandar Abbas
				Stadium: Azadi Bandar Abbas Stadium; Attendance: 4,000; Referee: Mehdi Akhavan (Iran)
Note: The match was originally planned to be held in Azadi Stadium, but due to the incidents that happened during the first leg match, Football Federation declares the match to be held in Bandar Abbas behind closed doors. However, a number of people were allowed to attend the match.

==== Final ====
31 January 1995	Saipa	1 – 0 (a.e.t.)	Esteghlal	Tehran
	Farshad Falahatzadeh 110'			Stadium: Azadi Stadium; Referee: Mohammad Fanaei (Iran)

=== Hazfi Cup ===
8 September 1994 Round of 64	Esteghlal	1 – 1 (a.e.t.) (5 – 4 p)	Ararat Tehran	Tehran
				Stadium: Azadi Stadium

23 September 1994 Round of 32	Esteghlal	4 – 0	Homa	Tehran
				Stadium: Azadi Stadium

26 September 1994 Round of 16	Esteghlal	1 – 3	Bahman	Tehran
				Stadium: Azadi Stadium

== See also ==
- 1994–95 Azadegan League
- 1994–95 Hazfi Cup
