= 1995–96 Azadegan League =

5th season of Azadegan League

Azadegan League
- Season: 1995–96
- Champions: Persepolis
- Relegated: Jonoob Ahvaz; Ararat Tehran; Shahrdari Tabriz; Saipa
- Asian Club Championship: Persepolis
- Asian Winners' Cup: Esteghlal
- Matches: 240
- Goals: 483 (2.01 per match)
- Top goalscorer: Mohammad Momeni (19)

The 1995–96 Azadegan League was the fifth season of the Azadegan League, the top-level league of professional football in Iran at the time, that was won by Persepolis.

Mohammad Momeni (Poli Ekril Isfahan) was the top scorer with 19 goals.

== Teams ==
Sixteen teams competed in the league – the top thirteen teams from the previous season and three teams promoted from the Iran 2nd Division. Promoted teams were Polyacryl, Bahman and Bank Melli, all making their debut in the Azadegan League. They replaced Zob Ahan, Naft Ghaemshahr, Chooka Talesh, Bank Tejarat, Teraktor Sazi, Payam Khorasan, Pars Khodro, Sanat Naft Abadan, Nassaji Mazandaran, Qods Sari and Shahin Bushehr.

== League table ==
Pos	Team	Pld	W	D	L	GF	GA	GD	Pts	Qualification or relegation
1	Persepolis (C)	30	15	12	3	33	18	+15	57	Qualification for the 1996–97 Asian Club Championship
2	Bahman	30	13	12	5	47	24	+23	51	
3	Esteghlal	30	14	9	7	41	26	+15	51	Qualification for the 1996–97 Asian Cup Winners' Cup
4	PAS	30	13	6	11	33	35	−2	45	
5	Sepahan	30	11	9	10	40	34	+6	42	
6	Bargh Shiraz	30	11	9	10	32	26	+6	42	
7	Esteghlal Ahvaz	30	12	5	13	40	41	−1	41	
8	Machine Sazi	30	11	8	11	35	38	−3	41	
9	Keshavarz	30	9	13	8	32	25	+7	40	
10	Polyacryl	30	10	8	12	33	39	−6	38	
11	Shamoushak Noshahr	30	10	8	12	28	38	−10	38	
12	Malavan	30	9	10	11	21	25	−4	37	
13	Jonoob Ahvaz (R)	30	9	9	12	26	39	−13	36	Relegation to the 1996–97 Iran 2nd Division
14	Ararat Tehran (R)	30	8	7	15	27	39	−12	31	Relegation to the 1996–97 Iran 2nd Division
15	Sh. Tabriz (R)	30	6	10	14	24	34	−10	28	Relegation to the 1996–97 Iran 2nd Division
16	Saipa (R)	30	5	13	12	31	42	−11	28	Relegation to the 1996–97 Iran 2nd Division

Updated to match(es) played on 1 September 2018. Source: RSSSF
Rules for classification: 1) Points; 2) Goal difference; 3) Goals scored.
(C) Champions; (R) Relegated

== Statistitcs ==
=== Top scorers ===
Rank	Player	Club	Goals
1	(Iran) Mohammad Momeni	Polyacryl	19
2	(Iran) Kourosh Barmak	Keshavarz	15
3	(Iran) Hashem Heydari	Bahman	14
3	(Iran) Alimirza Ostovari	Bargh Shiraz	14
5	(Iran) Mehdi Jafarpour	Machine Sazi	13
6	(Iran) Ali Asghar Modir	Keshavarz	12
7	(Iran) Edmond Bezik	Ararat Tehran	11
7	(Iran) Edmond Akhtar	Esteghlal	11
9	(Iran) Farhad H. Arab	Esteghlal Ahvaz	10

- Iranian football champions: Persepolis
- Relegated: Jonoob Ahvaz, Ararat Tehran, Shahrdari Tabriz, Saipa
- Promoted: Zob Ahan, Payam Mashhad, Teraktor Sazi, Sanat Naft
