= 1994–95 Azadegan League =

4th season of Azadegan League

Azadegan League
- Season: 1994–95
- Champions: Saipa
- Relegated: Shahin Bushehr, Qods Sari, Nassaji Mazandaran, Teraktor Sazi, Zob Ahan, Sanat Naft, Pars Khodro, Payam Gach Khorasan, Bank Tejarat, Chooka Talesh, Naft Ghaemshahr, Shahdari Sari
- Asian Club Championship: Saipa
- Asian Winners' Cup: Bahman
- Top goalscorer: Farshad Pious (20)

The 1994–95 Azadegan League was the fourth season of the Azadegan League, the top-level league of professional football in Iran at the time, that was won by the defending champions Saipa.

== Group stage ==
Group A
Pos	Team	Pld	W	D	L	GF	GA	GD	Pts	Qualification or relegation
1	Saipa	22	11	7	4	30	16	+14	29	Promoted to Semi-final
2	Esteghlal	22	10	7	5	25	20	+5	27	Promoted to Semi-final
3	Machine Sazi	22	9	7	6	27	21	+6	25	
4	Shahrdari Tabriz	22	7	10	5	26	22	+4	24	
5	Jonoob Ahvaz	22	6	12	4	23	19	+4	24	
6	Sepahan	22	8	6	8	28	25	+3	22	
7	Naft Ghaemshahr (R)	22	8	6	8	20	22	−2	22	Relegated to 2nd Division
8	Chooka Talesh (R)	22	7	8	7	15	19	−4	22	Relegated to 2nd Division
9	Bank Tejarat (R)	22	7	7	8	27	25	+2	21	Relegated to 2nd Division
10	Payam Gach Khorasan (R)	22	6	6	10	21	32	−11	18	Relegated to 2nd Division
11	Pars Khodro (R)	22	2	11	9	19	29	−10	15	Relegated to 2nd Division
12	Sanat Naft (R)	22	3	9	10	27	38	−11	15	Relegated to 2nd Division

(R) Relegated

Group B
Pos	Team	Pld	W	D	L	GF	GA	GD	Pts	Qualification or relegation
1	Persepolis	22	14	5	3	53	17	+36	33	Promoted to Semi-final
2	Keshavarz	22	8	11	3	26	15	+11	27	Promoted to Semi-final
3	Bargh Shiraz	22	8	10	4	18	11	+7	26	
4	Esteghlal Ahvaz	22	8	10	4	31	27	+4	26	
5	Ararat	22	8	9	5	31	19	+12	25	
6	PAS Tehran	22	6	13	3	32	22	+10	25	
7	Malavan	22	8	8	6	23	16	+7	24	
8	Zob Ahan (R)	22	6	11	5	31	34	−3	24 (Note: 1 bonus point?)	Relegated to 2nd Division
9	Tractor Sazi (R)	22	5	10	7	29	31	−2	20	Relegated to 2nd Division
10	Nassaji Mazandaran (R)	22	5	6	11	16	32	−16	15 (Note: 1 point deducted?)	Relegated to 2nd Division
11	Qods Sari (R)	22	5	4	13	16	33	−17	14	Relegated to 2nd Division
12	Shahin Bushehr (R)	22	0	5	17	7	56	−49	5	Relegated to 2nd Division

(R) Relegated

== Knockout stage ==
=== Semi-final ===
Team 1	Agg.	Team 2	1st leg	2nd leg
Saipa	1–0	Keshavarz	1–0	0–0
Persepolis	0–3	Esteghlal	0–3 (awd.)	0–0

First Leg

20 January 1995

Saipa	1–0	Keshavarz

Azadi Stadium, Tehran

Second Leg

27 January 1995

Keshavarz	0–0	Saipa

Azadi Stadium, Tehran

First Leg

20 January 1995

Persepolis	2–2 (0–3 awarded)	Esteghlal
Pious 51', Dadashzadeh 56'		Varmazyar 79', Akhtar 87'

Azadi Stadium, Tehran
Attendance: 100,000
Referee: Ahmad Abharan (Iran)

Second Leg

27 January 1995

Esteghlal	0–0	Persepolis

Azadi Bandar Abbas Stadium Bandar Abbas
Attendance: 4,000
Referee: Mehdi Akhavan (Iran)

Notes

1. A The original match was 2–2 until 88' when Persepolis fans stormed into the ground. Football Federation awarded the match 3–0 for Esteghlal.
2. B The match was originally planned to be held in Azadi Stadium, but due to the incidents that happened during the first leg match, Football Federation declares the match to be held in Bandar Abbas behind closed doors. However, a number of people were allowed to attend the match.

=== Third-place match ===
Team 1	Score	Team 2
Keshavarz	Not held	Persepolis

January 1995

Keshavarz	v	Persepolis

*not held because Persepolis refused to participate.

=== Final ===
Team 1	Score	Team 2
Saipa	1–0	Esteghlal

31 January 1995

Saipa	1 – 0	Esteghlal
Farshad Falahatzadeh 110'

Azadi Stadium, Tehran

=== Final standings ===
Pos	Team	Qualification
1	Saipa	Qualification for the 1995 Asian Club Championship
2	Esteghlal	
3	Keshavarz	
4	Persepolis	

== Notes ==
- Azadegan League champions : Saipa F.C.
- Relegated teams : Shahin Bushehr, Qods Sari, Nassaji Mazandaran, Teraktor Sazi, Zob Ahan, Sanat Naft, Pars Khodro, Payam Gach Khorasan, Bank Tejarat, Chooka Talesh, Naft Ghaemshahr, Shahdari Sari
- Promoted teams : Bahman, Polyacryl Esfahan, Shemushack Noshahr
- Malavan was initially supposed to be relegated to the 2nd Division, but since Bank Melli- which was to be promoted to the 1st Division - withdrew, the Federation offered their spot to Malavan.

== Top goal scorers ==
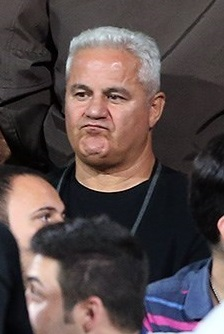
Farshad Pious

20

- (Iran) Farshad Pious (Persepolis)

15

- (Iran) Ali Daei (Persepolis)

14

- (Iran) Seyed Kamal Hosseini (Zob Ahan)

12

- (Iran) Ahmad Reza Sohrabi (Pas)

11

- (Iran) Edmond Akhtar (docharhkeh savaran)
- (Iran) Edmond Bezik (Ararat)
