= 1993–94 Iran 2nd Division =

Iran Football's 2nd Division
- Season: 1993–94
- Champions: Naft Ghaemshahr
- Promoted: Naft Ghaemshahr; Machine Sazi; Shahin Bushehr; Payam Mashhad
- Relegated: Fajr Khorramabad; Fajr Alvand Hamedan; Motozhen Tabriz; Fajr Kermanshah; Shahrdari Kerman; Bank Saderat Sarin; Shahed Talesh

The 1993–94 Iran 2nd Division football season was played in one group, comprising ten teams. The top four teams gained promotion to the Azadegan League.

== Standings ==
Pos	Team	Pld	W	D	L	GF	GA	GD	Pts	Promotion or relegation
1	Naft Ghaemshahr	26	12	12	2	39	20	+19	36	Promoted 1994–95 Azadegan League
2	Machine Sazi	26	12	11	3	40	20	+20	35	Promoted 1994–95 Azadegan League
3	Shahin Bushehr	26	12	7	7	36	24	+12	31	Promoted 1994–95 Azadegan League
4	Payam Mashhad	26	12	7	7	33	21	+12	31	Promoted 1994–95 Azadegan League
5	Sepidrood	26	8	12	6	30	33	−3	28	
6	Gach Khorasan	26	8	11	7	28	25	+3	27	
7	Bank Saderat Kermanshah	26	11	4	11	26	25	+1	26	
8	Khalij Marvdasht	26	9	8	9	25	25	0	26	
9	Khazar Mahmodabad	26	6	12	8	16	21	−5	24	
10	Mersad Shiraz	26	7	9	10	25	25	0	23	
11	Shahed Talesh	26	7	9	10	15	21	−6	23	Relegated to 3rd Division
12	Bank Saderat Sari	26	4	12	10	20	33	−13	20	Relegated to 3rd Division
13	Shahrdari Kerman	26	5	8	13	26	37	−11	18	Relegated to 3rd Division
14	Fajr Khorramabad	26	3	10	13	21	49	−28	16	Relegated to 3rd Division
