= Fanaei =

Fanaei (Persian: فنائی) is an Iranian surname. Notable people with the surname include:

- Davoud Fanaei (born 1975), Iranian footballer and referee
- Mohammad Fanaei (born 1951), Iranian football referee
