= Teymourian =

Teymourian is a surname. Notable people with the surname include:

- Andranik Teymourian (born 1983), Iranian footballer, brother of Serjik
- Roya Teymourian (born 1959), Iranian actress
- Serjik Teymourian (1974–2020), Armenian-Iranian footballer
