= 1994–95 Iran 2nd Division =

Iran Football's 2nd Division
- Season: 1994–95
- Champions: Polyacryl Esfahan F.C.
- Promoted: Bahman; Polyacryl Esfahan; Shahin Bushehr

The 1994–95 Iran 2nd Division football season was played in one group, with ten teams competing. The top three teams (Bahman, Bank Melli, Polyacryl Esfahan) gained promotion to the Azadegan League.
