= Sirous Dinmohammadi =

Iranian footballer (born 1970)

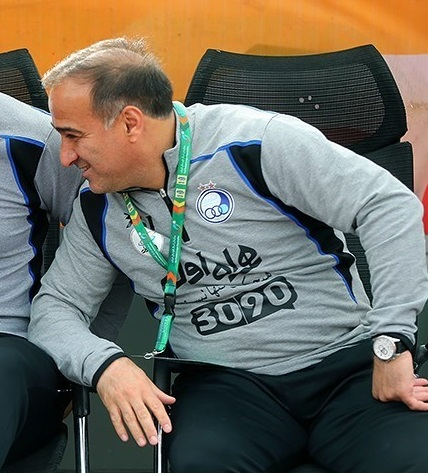
- Dinmohammadi in 2016

Personal information
- Date of birth: 2 July 1970 (age 56)
- Place of birth: Tabriz, Iran
- Height: 1.66 m (5 ft 5 in)
- Position: Attacking midfielder

Youth career
- 1992: Tractor

Senior career*
Years	Team	Apps	(Gls)
1992–1993	Tractor	28	(2)
1993–1994	Bank Tejarat	4	(2)
1994–1998	Shahrdari Tabriz	33	(9)
1998–1999	Esteghlal	25	(8)
1999–2000	Mainz 05	28	(0)
2000–2003	Esteghlal	58	(8)
2003–2004	Pegah	22	(1)
2004–2005	Sanaye Arak		

International career
1993–2001	Iran	43	(6)

Managerial career
- 2013–2015: Esteghlal B
- 2015–2016: Esteghlal (assistant)
- 2017: Rah Ahan
- 2017–2018: Shahrdari Tabriz
- 2020: Nassaji Mazandaran (assistant)
- 2020: Esteghlal (assistant)
- 2021: Navad Urmia (technical director)
- 2023: Havadar (assistant)
- 2024: Paykan (advisor)
- 2024–2025: Paykan
- * Club domestic league appearances and goals

Sirous Dinmohammadi (Persian: سیروس دین‌محمدی; born 2 July 1970) is an Iranian football manager and former professional football player. He played primarily as an attacking midfielder during his playing career, representing clubs such as Tractor and Esteghlal. He also represented the Iran national football team from 1993 to 2001, participating in the 1996 AFC Asian Cup and the 1998 FIFA World Cup. After retiring as a player, he moved into coaching and has served as a coach and manager for several Iranian clubs.

== Club career ==
Dinmohammadi began his career with Tractor in 1992, then played for Bank Tejarat before joining Shahrdari Tabriz in 1994. He moved to Esteghlal in 1998, and during the 1998–99 season he made 25 league appearances and scored eight goals.

In 1999, he moved to Germany to join Mainz 05, where he spent one season in the 2. Bundesliga. During the 1999–2000 season, he made 28 appearances in the 2. Bundesliga and four appearances in the DFB-Pokal.

After returning to Esteghlal in 2000, he won the Azadegan League in the 2000–01 season and the Hazfi Cup in the 2001–02 season. In the Iran Pro League during the 2001–02 season, he made 24 appearances and scored seven goals, while Esteghlal finished as league runners-up.

In 2003, he moved to Pegah, where he scored one goal in 22 league appearances during the 2003–04 season. He then joined Sanaye Arak in 2004 and retired from professional football after the 2004–05 season. His playing career is recorded as having ended on 1 July 2005.

== International career ==
Dinmohammadi was called up to the Iran national team in 1993 and made his international debut on 6 June in a friendly against the Pakistan. He continued to represent the national team until 2001, making 14 appearances in 1996. He also participated in the 1996 AFC Asian Cup, where Iran finished third.

In 1998, he participated in the 1998 FIFA World Cup. He did not play in Iran's group-stage matches against Yugoslavia or the United States, but came on as a substitute for Javad Zarinche in the 70th minute of the final group-stage match against Germany. Iran lost 0–2 to Germany but had previously defeated the United States 2–1.

In 2000, he scored against the Maldives in the 2000 AFC Asian Cup qualification. In 2001, he played in the Asian qualifiers for the 2002 FIFA World Cup and other international matches. In July, he scored in a friendly against the Bosnia and Herzegovina, and in August he scored a hat-trick against the Oman in the semi-final of the LG Cup. He also scored against the Saudi Arabia in a World Cup qualifier in September, scoring five goals in 2001 alone.

Dinmohammadi made his final international appearance on 31 October 2001 in the 2002 FIFA World Cup Asian qualifying playoff against the United Arab Emirates. Iran won the match 3–0. He made a total of 44 appearances and scored six goals for the national team.

== Career statistics ==
=== Club ===
As of 13 June 2019

Club	Division	Season	League		Cup		Other		Total	
Club	Division	Season	Apps	Goals	Apps	Goals	Apps	Goals	Apps	Goals
Mainz 05	2. Bundesliga	1999–00	28	0	4	0	—		32	0
Pegah	Persian Gulf Pro League	2004–05	11	1			—			
Career total			39	1			—			

=== International ===
#	Date	Venue	Opponent	Score	Result	Competition
1.	31 March 2000	Al-Hamadaniah Stadium, Aleppo, Syria	Maldives	2–0	8–0	2000 AFC Asian Cup qualification
2.	22 July 2001	Stadion pod Borićima, Bihać, Bosnia and Herzegovina	Bosnia and Herzegovina	1–2	2–2	Friendly
3.	8 August 2001	Azadi Stadium, Tehran, Iran	Oman	2–0	5–2	2001 LG Cup
4.	8 August 2001	Azadi Stadium, Tehran, Iran	Oman	3–0	5–2	2001 LG Cup
5.	8 August 2001	Azadi Stadium, Tehran, Iran	Oman	5–2	5–2	2001 LG Cup
6.	28 September 2001	Prince Abdullah Al-Faisal Sports City Stadium, Jeddah, Saudi Arabia	Saudi Arabia	2–2	2–2	2002 FIFA World Cup qualification
Correct as of 24 July 2021

== Honours ==
Esteghlal

- Iranian Football League: 2000–01
- Hazfi Cup: 2001–02
