= Javad Ghorab =

Iranian footballer

Personal information
- Full name: Javad Ghorab
- Date of birth: July 30, 1949 (age 77)
- Place of birth: Iran
- Height: 1.81 m (5 ft 11 1/2 in)
- Position: Midfielder

Senior career*
Years	Team	Apps	(Gls)
1970–1976	Taj SC		

International career
1971–1974	Iran	18	(0)
- * Club domestic league appearances and goals

Javad Ghorab is an Iranian former football midfielder who played for Iran in the 1972 Summer Olympics . He also played for Taj SC.

== Record at Olympic Games ==
National team	Year	Apps	Goals
Iran	1972	1	0

== Honours ==
=== Club ===
- Asian Club Championship

1970: Winner
1971: Third place

- Takht Jamshid Cup

Winner: 1

1974–75 with Taj SC

Runner up: 1

1973–74 with Taj SC
