= Abbas Nouvinrozegar =

Iranian footballer

Personal information
- Full name: Abbas Nouvinrozegar
- Place of birth: Iran
- Position: Midfielder

Senior career*
Years	Team	Apps	(Gls)
1969–1979	Taj Tehran		

International career
1973	Iran	1	(0)
- * Club domestic league appearances and goals

Abbas Nouvinrozegar (Persian: عباس نوین روزگار) is a retired Iranian midfielder who played for Iran national football team. He was formerly playing for Taj Tehran.
