= Kourosh Tashtzar =

Iranian former association footballer

Personal information
- Place of birth: Iran
- Position: Midfielder

Senior career*
Years	Team	Apps	(Gls)
1988–1991	Esteghlal		
1991–1993	Keshavarz		
1993–1995	Esteghlal		
1995–1996	Saipa		
1996–1999	Keshavarz		
1999–2000	Bargh Tehran		
- * Club domestic league appearances and goals

Kourosh Tashtzar (Persian: کوروش تشت‌زر) is an Iranian former footballer who was last known to have played as a midfielder for Bargh Tehran.

== Playing career ==
Tashtzar was regarded as a well-known player in Iranian football during the 1990s. He is also regarded as one of the most physically attractive Iranian players.

== Post-playing career ==
After retiring from professional football, Tashtzar worked as a journalist and a mobile phone seller.

== Personal life ==
Tashtzar has been married and moved to Canada.
