= Alimirza Ostovari =

Iranian footballer

Personal information
- Full name: Alimirza Ostovari
- Date of birth: June 1, 1973 (age 53)
- Place of birth: Iran
- Position: Midfielder

Senior career*
Years	Team	Apps	(Gls)
1995–1998	Bargh Shiraz		
1998–1999	Admira Wacker		
1999–2001	Esteghlal		
2001–2002	PAS Tehran		
2002–2003	Paykan		

International career
1996–1997	Iran	3	(1)
2006	Iran (beach soccer)	4	(1)
- * Club domestic league appearances and goals

Alimirza Ostovari is an Iranian football midfielder who played for Iran in the 1996 Asian Cup. He also played for Bargh Shiraz.

== Honours ==
=== Club ===
- Azadegan League

Winner: 1

Esteghlal

- Hazfi Cup

Runner up: 1

Esteghlal
