= Mohsen Garousi =

Iranian footballer and manager

Personal information
- Full name: Mohsen Garousi
- Date of birth: 28 November 1968 (age 57)
- Position: Striker

Senior career*
| Years | Team | Apps | (Gls) |
| 1988–1991 | Esteghlal | | |
| 1991–1996 | PAS | | |
| 1996–1997 | Geylang United | | |
| 1998–2000 | PAS | | |
| 2000–2001 | Aboomoslem | | |
| 2001–2003 | PAS | | |
| 2003–2004 | Shahab Zanjan | | |

International career^{‡}
| 1989–1997 | Iran | 32 | (8) |
| 1992 | Iran (futsal) | | |

Managerial career
- Shahab Zanjan
- Ekbatan
- 2006: Ekbatan
- * Club domestic league appearances and goals as of 4 April 2009 ‡ National team caps and goals as of 19 December 2008

Mohsen Garousi (Persian: محسن گروسی, born 28 November 1968) is an Iranian retired football player and manager. Following his playing career, he coached Shahab Zanjan F.C. and served as the assistant of Farhad Kazemi at Paykan F.C. He was later appointed by Ekbatan F.C. as the head coach, but was sacked after only five matches in charge. He also played for Geylang United F.C. in Singapore during 1996 and 1997 seasons.

== Achievements ==
- 4th Place: 1992 FIFA Futsal World Championship with Iran national futsal team.
- Champion: ECO Cup 1993 with Iran national football team.
- Champion: 1992–93 Asian Club Championship with PAS Tehran F.C.
