= Parviz Boroumand =

Iranian footballer (born 1974)

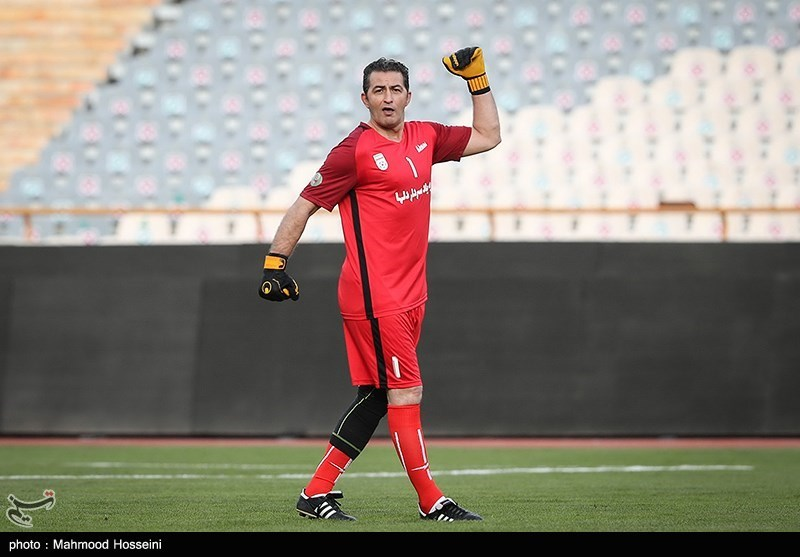
- Parviz Boroumand in the middle

Personal information
- Full name: Parviz Boroumand Sharifi
- Date of birth: 30 May 1974 (age 52)
- Place of birth: Tehran, Iran
- Height: 1.91 m (6 ft 3 in)
- Position: Goalkeeper

Senior career*
Years	Team	Apps	(Gls)
1993–1994	Sepahan		
1994–1996	Fajr Sepah Tehran		
1996–1997	Fajr Sepasi		
1998–2004	Esteghlal		
2004–2007	Rah Ahan	14	(0)
2012–2013	Parseh	9	(0)

International career
1998–2001	Iran	20	(0)
- * Club domestic league appearances and goals

Parviz Boroumand Sharif (Persian: پرویز برومند شریف, born 30 May 1974, in Tehran) is an Iranian football goalkeeper who currently is head coach of Dore 98 F.C. in Iran 2nd division League.

== Club career ==
Broumand previously played for IPL sides Esteghlal and Rah Ahan.

Broumand was also formerly an Iranian national team player who was reserve goalkeeper in the 1998 FIFA World Cup squad.

His most memorable performance was for Esteghlal FC against Persepolis FC in 2001 when he struck a Persepolis player Payan Rafat in the face starting one of the largest fights in the history of the rivalry. After this game Broumand and several players from both sides were handed suspensions, his being the largest at 18 months was eventually shortened.

In 2007, he announced his retirement from football after finishing 2006–2007 season with Rah Ahan in Iran Pro League, but in 2012 he returned to professional football after six years absence in age of 38. He joined his former Esteghlal teammate Mehdi Pashazadeh who was a head-coach for Parseh Tehran.

=== Club career statistics ===
Club performance			League	
Season	Club	League	Apps	Goals
Iran			League	
2001–02	Esteghlal	Pro League	7	0
2002–03	Esteghlal	Pro League	2	0
2003–04	Esteghlal	Pro League	10	0
2004–05	Rah Ahan	Division 1	?	0
2005–06	Rah Ahan	Pro League	5	0
2006–07	Rah Ahan	Pro League	9	0
2012–13	Parseh	Division 1	5	0
Career total			38	0

== Personal life ==
On 5 January 2026, Boroumand publicly supported the 2025–2026 Iranian protests on his Instagram, stating: "The voices of the oppressed, noble, and dignified people of Iran are audible. These people are not rioters."
