= Naft Ghaemshahr F.C. =

- Full name: Naft Ghaemshahr Football Club باشگاه فوتبال نفت قائمشهر
- Founded: 1990
- Dissolved: 1995
- Ground: Vatani Stadium; Qa'em Shahr; Iran
- Capacity: 15,000
- Owner: National Iranian Oil Company
- League: Azadegan League
- 1994–95: Azadegan League Group A, 7th (Relegated)
Home colours	Away colours

Naft Ghaemshahr is an Iranian football club based in Qa'em Shahr, Iran that was founded in 1990. They competed in the Azadegan League. They are owned by the National Iranian Oil Company.
