= Hamid Babazadeh =

Iranian footballer

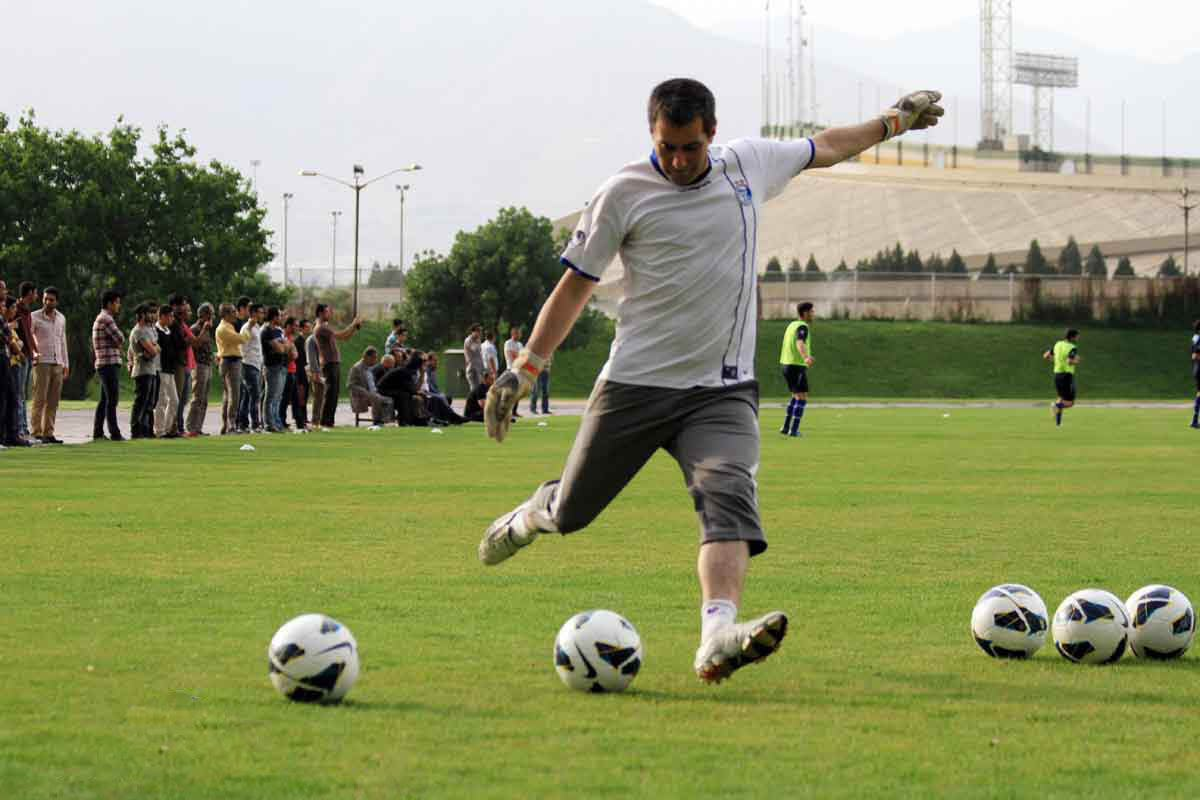

Personal information
- Full name: Hamid Babazadeh
- Date of birth: 2 February 1964 (age 62)
- Place of birth: Tehran, Iran
- Position: Goalkeeper

Senior career*
Years	Team	Apps	(Gls)
1988–1990	Daraei		
1990–1997	Esteghlal		
1997–1998	Bahman		

International career
1994–1998	Iran		

Managerial career
- 2008–2009: Esteghlal (goalkeeping coach)
- 2009–2010: Steel Azin (goalkeeping coach)
- 2010–2011: Sepahan (goalkeeping coach)
- 2011: Iran (goalkeeping coach)
- 2011–2012: Saipa (goalkeeping coach)
- 2012–2014: Esteghlal (goalkeeping coach)
- 2014–2016: Paykan (goalkeeping coach)
- 2016–2017: Esteghlal (goalkeeping coach)
- * Club domestic league appearances and goals

Hamid Babazadeh (born 2 February 1964 in Tehran) is a retired Iranian goalkeeper and current a goalkeeping coach and in the recent years at Esteghlal He was formerly goalkeeping coach of Steel Azin, Sepahan, Saipa and Iran national football team and was most worked with Amir Ghalenoei.

== Team Melli (National team) ==
Babazadeh was a reserve goalkeeper for the Iran national football team at the 1988 AFC Asian Cup finals in Qatar.

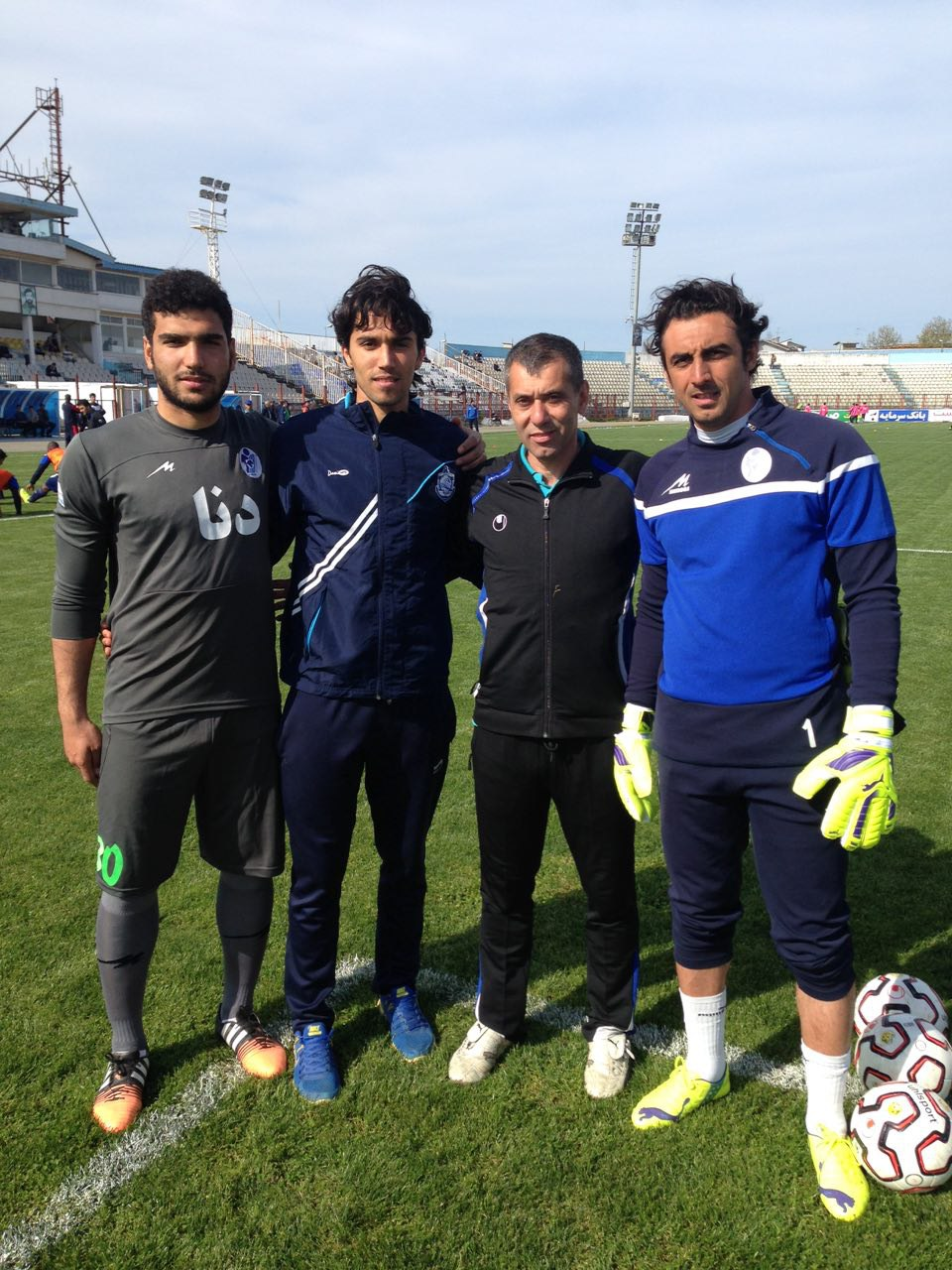
Babazadeh as the Goalkeeper coach at Esteghlal FC
