= Ali Mousavi (footballer) =

Iranian footballer (born 1974)

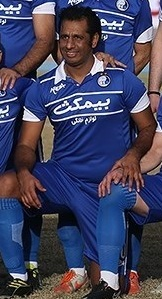

Personal information
- Full name: Seyed Ali Mousavi
- Date of birth: 22 April 1974 (age 52)
- Place of birth: Khorramshahr, Iran
- Height: 1.86 m (6 ft 1 in)
- Position: Forward

Youth career
- Homa
- –1996: PAS Tehran

Senior career*
Years	Team	Apps	(Gls)
1996–1998	PAS Tehran		
1998–1999	Esteghlal		
1999–2000	Fortuna Köln	24	(6)
2000	Bayer Leverkusen	0	(0)
2000	Bayer Leverkusen II	4	(3)
2000–2003	Esteghlal		
2003–2004	Foolad		
2004–2005	Bargh Tehran		
2005–2006	Homa		
2006–2007	Aboumoslem	4	(0)
2008–2009	Armin Tehran		

International career
1996–2000	Iran	28	(9)
- * Club domestic league appearances and goals

Seyed Ali Mousavi (Persian: سید علی موسوی, born 22 April 1974) is an Iranian former professional footballer who played as a forward.

== Club career ==
Mousavi was born in Khorramshahr, Iran. He played in the German 2. Bundesliga with Fortuna Köln.

== International career ==
Ali Mousavi played for the Iran national football team in the 1998 Asian Games where Iran captured the gold medal. Mousavi was also recalled to the national team during Mansour Pourheidari's tenure.
