= Mohammad Momeni =

Iranian footballer

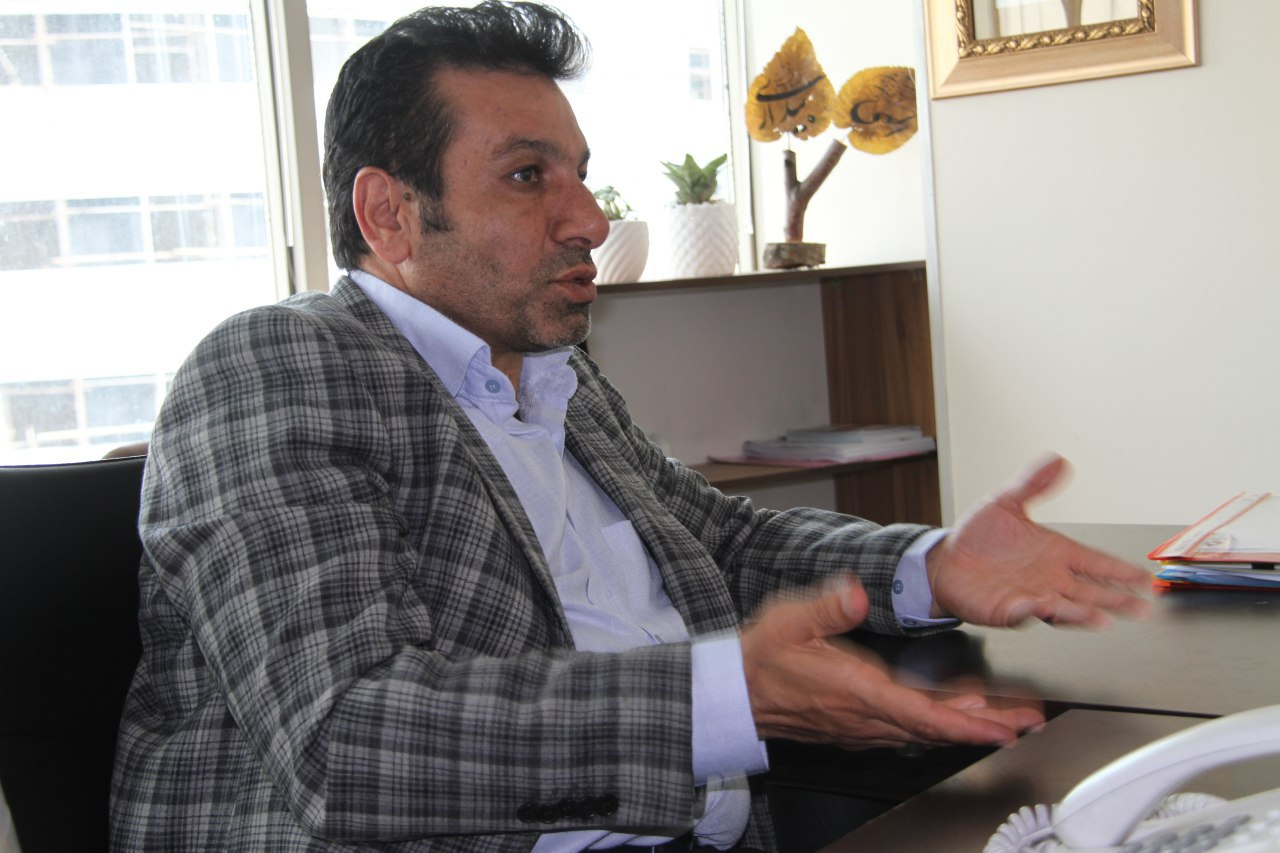

Personal information
- Full name: Mohammad Momeni Moghaddam
- Date of birth: 23 December 1972 (age 53)
- Place of birth: Zabol, Iran
- Position: Centre-forward

Senior career*
Years	Team	Apps	(Gls)
1991–1994	Shahin Zahedan		
1994–1995	Payam Gach		
1995–1998	Polyacryl		
1998–2000	Esteghlal		
2000	Erzurumspor	4	(0)
2000–2004	Saipa		
2004–2005	Rah Ahan		
2005–2007	Homa		

International career
1996	Iran	1	(0)
- * Club domestic league appearances and goals

Mohammad Momeni (Persian: محمد مؤمنی; born 23 December 1972) is a retired Iranian professional footballer who played during most of his career for Saipa.

== Club career ==
Momeni was the Iranian top division's top scorer with 19 goals during the 1995–96 season. He had a brief spell with Erzurumspor in the Turkish Super Lig.

== International career ==
Momeni made two appearances for the full Iran national football team, both of them in friendly matches against Turkmenistan on 26 and 28 April 1996.
