= Javid Shokri =

Iranian footballer

Personal information
- Full name: Javid Shokri Zonuz
- Place of birth: Tabriz, Iran
- Position: Midfielder

Senior career*
Years	Team	Apps	(Gls)
- Machine Sazi
1996–1999	Esteghlal		

International career
1997	Iran	1	(0)
- * Club domestic league appearances and goals

Javid Shokri is an Iranian football midfielder who played for Iran and Esteghlal F.C.
