= Bank Tejarat F.C. =

Bank Tejarat Football Club
- Full name: Bank Tejarat Football Club
- League: Tehran League, Azadegan league of Iran
Home colours	Away colours

Bank Tejarat Football Club (Persian: بانک تجارت, Bank Tejaret) was an Iranian football club based in Tehran. It was owned by Bank Tejarat, a state owned bank in the country. In 1989, Parviz Abutaleb owner of Butan F.C. sold the rights and license of the club to Bank Tejarat. They are famous for launching the career of Iranian football legend Ali Daei. His coach was Amir hajrezaei who was head coach of the Iranian national under 17s team in 1990. From 1991 to 1994 Godarz Habibi was his assistant. In 1996, Tejarat started in the Tehran league division 1 again and in May, 2001 sold the rights and license of the club.

== Managers ==
- (Iran) Nasser Hejazi
- (Iran) Hassan Rowshan
- (Iran) Jalal Cheraghpour
