= Samad Marfavi =

Iranian football coach and former player (born 1964)

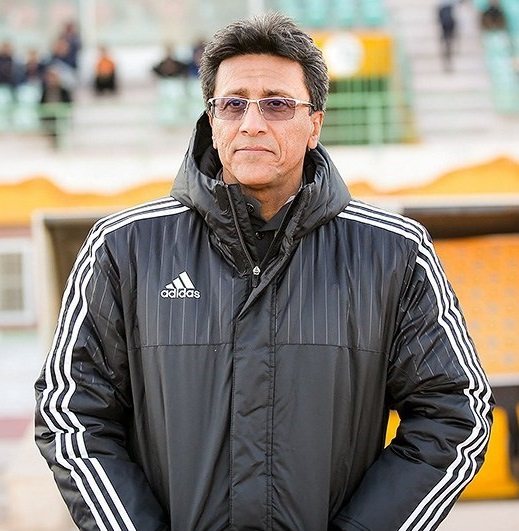

Personal information
- Full name: Abdolsamad Marfavi
- Date of birth: May 18, 1964 (age 62)
- Place of birth: Khorramshahr, Iran
- Height: 1.82 m (5 ft 11 1/2 in)
- Position: Striker

Team information
- Current team: Iran U-20

Youth career
- 1980–1983: PAS FC

Senior career*
Years	Team	Apps	(Gls)
1983–1985	Niroye Zamini		
1985–1986	Sepahan		
1986–1989	Daraei		
1989–1993	Esteghlal		
1993–1994	Keshavarz		
1995–1996	Al Kuwait		
1996–1997	Esteghlal		
1998	Tanjong Pagar United FC		
1998–1999	Bahman		

International career
1986–1994	Iran	31	(11)

Managerial career
- 2000–2002: Esteghlal (youth)
- 2002–2003: Esteghlal Ahvaz (assistant)
- 2003–2006: Esteghlal (assistant)
- 2006–2007: Esteghlal
- 2007: Esteghlal (assistant)
- 2007–2008: Esteghlal Ahvaz (assistant)
- 2008–2009: Esteghlal (assistant)
- 2009–2010: Esteghlal
- 2010–2011: Mes Kerman
- 2012–2014: Saba Qom
- 2014–2015: Paykan
- 2016–2017: Saba Qom
- 2020: Nassaji (Technical Director)
- 2020–2021: Esteghlal (Technical Director)
- 2022–2023: Iran U-20
- * Club domestic league appearances and goals

Abdolsamad Marfavi (Persian: عبدالصمد مرفاوی; born May 18, 1964, in Khorramshahr), better known as Samad Marfavi (Persian: صمد مرفاوی), is an Iranian football coach and former player.

== Club career ==
He played the majority of his playing career for IPL giants Esteghlal.

== International career ==
Marfavi debuted for the Iranian national team against Kuwait on February 27, 1987. He scored 11 goals in 31 appearances for Iran.

== Managerial career ==
He was Esteghlal's assistant coach from 2003 until 2006 when he was replaced with Amir Ghalenoei who was appointed as the Iran national football team coach in August 2006 just one month before the season starts. He had a good season result till 27th week of the season and Esteghlal was in first place but the last three weeks of the season was a distastor for him where he only earned one point out of 3 home matches and finished fourth. He came back as the assistant coach of Nasser Hejazi next season but after the differences he left the club and returned the season after to help Amir Ghalenoei to win the league. After Amir Ghalenoei left the club for Sepahan, he was re-appointed as the head coach of Esteghlal in July 2009. On 18 May 2010, he extended his contract with Esteghlal for another season. However, he would later resign from his position only a couple of days later. On 2 June 2010, he was appointed head coach of Mes Kerman and was resigned on 25 August 2011. He became head coach of Saba Qom on 25 September 2012 and signed a contract until end of the season. Before the start of 2013–14 season, it was announced that his contract will not renewed. On 11 November 2013, he was reappointed as Saba's head coach for a second time.

As of 4 May 2017

Team	From	To	Record							
Team	From	To	G	W	D	L	Win %	GF	GA	+/-
Esteghlal	15 August 2006	3 July 2007	30	14	10	6	45%	39	30	+9
Esteghlal	1 July 2009	1 June 2010	43	20	13	10	46%	77	45	+32
Mes	2 June 2010	25 August 2011	40	13	14	13	30%	46	41	+5
Saba	25 September 2012	31 May 2013	28	7	14	7	25%	30	28	+2
Saba	11 November 2013	26 November 2014	31	10	10	11	32%	31	35	–4
Paykan	27 November 2014	1 July 2015	8	0	5	3	0%	5	9	–4
Saba	3 July 2016	26 July 2017	31	8	10	13	25%	30	33	–3
Total			212	73	77	63	35%	257	220	+41

== Honours ==
- Gold Medal winner at 1990 Asian Games, as member of the Iran national football team.
- Nominated for 1991 Asian Footballer of the year winning 16 votes losing to Yong-Hwan Chung who received 28 and Joo-Sung Kim who won the award with 31 votes.
