= Ali Chini =

Iranian footballer and coach

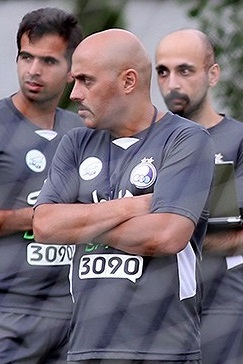

Personal information
- Full name: Ali Chini
- Date of birth: July 10, 1976 (age 50)
- Place of birth: Tehran, Iran
- Position: Midfielder

Youth career
- 1993–1996: Payam Mashhad

Senior career*
Years	Team	Apps	(Gls)
1996–1998	Payam Mashhad		
1998–2000	Esteghlal		
2000–2002	Esteghlal Rasht		
2002–2005	Nassaji Mazandaran		

Managerial career
- 2006–2008: Esteghlal (youth)
- 2008–2009: Esteghlal B (assistant)
- 2009–2012: Esteghlal B
- 2013–2014: Shamoushak (assistant)
- 2014–2016: Naft Tehran (assistant)
- 2016–2017: Esteghlal (assistant)
- 2018–: Iran national amputee football team
- * Club domestic league appearances and goals

Ali Chini (Persian: علی چینی, born 10 July 1976) is a former Iranian football player and a current coach. He was assistant coach of Esteghlal

== Club career ==
He previously played for the Payam Mashhad from 1996–1998 and Esteghlal from 1998–2000.
