= Reza Hassanzadeh (footballer, born 1964) =

Iranian footballer

Reza Hasanzadeh
Personal information
- Full name: Reza hasanzadeh
- Date of birth: December 30, 1964 (age 61)
- Place of birth: Tehran, Iran
- Height: 1.81 m (5 ft 11 1/2 in)
- Position: Defender

Senior career*
Years	Team	Apps	(Gls)
1987–1988	Rah Ahan		
1988–1995	Esteghlal		
1995–1996	Kuwait SC		
1996–2000	Esteghlal		
2000–2002	Esteghlal Rasht		
2002–2004	Pegah Gilan		

International career
1990–1998	Iran	22	(3)

Managerial career
- 2021–: Shahid Ghandi Yazd
- * Club domestic league appearances and goals

Reza Hassanzadeh (Persian: رضا حسن‌زاده; born 1964 in Tehran, Iran) is a retired Iranian football player who played for Esteghlal Tehran for most of his career. He played defender in Esteghlal and Team Melli for almost a decade in 90's. During his professional career he scored 2 important goals. one of them was against Liaoning FC in 1990–91 Asian Club Championship Final. Reza scored Tehran giants first goal which later Samad Marfavi scored second goal and helped Esteghlal FC to win Asian title for second time. Reza also scored Team Melli's first goal against Japan in Asia (AFC).

== Beach Soccer career ==
After his retirement from professional football, he played for Iran in 2006. He was Team Melli's captain in 2006 AFC Beach Soccer Championship which was qualification for 2006 FIFA Beach Soccer World Cup which he helped Team Melli to secure place in world cup for a very first time.

== After retirement ==
He is now working in Tehran Municipality as Sports Consultant.
