= Iman Alami =

Iranian footballer (born 1968)

Iman Alemi
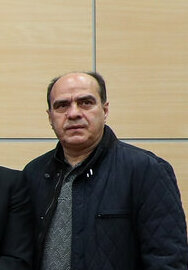
- Alemi in October 2024

Personal information
- Full name: Iman Alemi
- Date of birth: February 24, 1968 (age 58)
- Place of birth: Iran
- Position: Midfielder

Senior career*
Years	Team	Apps	(Gls)
- Bonyad Shahid
1991–1996	Esteghlal		
- Sepahan
- Sasana
- Hanoi Police
–2004	Bình Định		

International career
- Iran
- * Club domestic league appearances and goals

Iman Alemi (Persian: ایمان عالمی; born 24 February 1968) is a retired Iranian football player who played for Iran national football team in 1994 Asian Games. He formerly played for Esteghlal, Sepahan and the Iran national football team.
