= Mohammad Fanaei =

Iranian football referee (born 1951)

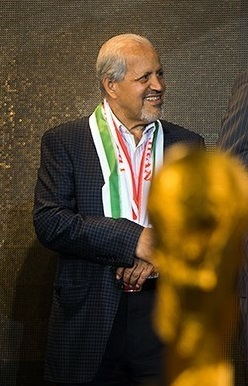
- Full name: Mohammad Fanaei

Mohammad Fanaei (born 24 December 1951) is a former Iranian association football (soccer) referee. He was an assistant referee for the final of the 1994 FIFA World Cup between Brazil and Italy. He also worked as an assistant referee at the 1992 Summer Olympics in Barcelona.

He was subsequently an assistant referee in two matches during the 1995 King Fahd Cup (precursor competition to the FIFA Confederations Cup), including the Final between Denmark and Argentina.

In 1994, he was named "Linesman of the Year" in the Asian Football Confederation.
