= Alireza Akbarpour =

Iranian footballer and coach

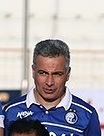

Personal information
- Full name: Alireza Akbarpour
- Date of birth: May 10, 1973 (age 53)
- Place of birth: Tabriz, Iran
- Position: Midfielder

Team information
- Current team: Machine Sazi (manager)

Youth career
- 1991–1992: Machine Sazi

Senior career*
Years	Team	Apps	(Gls)
1992–1996	Machine Sazi		
1996–2006	Esteghlal	99	(45)
2006–2010	Homa		

International career
1998–2000	Iran	3	(0)

Managerial career
- 2010–2012: Machine Sazi (assistant)
- 2012–2013: Machine Sazi
- 2018–2019: Esteghlal (youth)
- 2021–: Machine Sazi
- * Club domestic league appearances and goals

Alireza Akabarpour (Persian: علیرضا اکبرپور, born May 10, 1973) is a former Iranian footballer and a current coach.

== Career ==
Akbarpour played as a striker for the Iranian football team Esteghlal F.C. for years. Born in East Azarbaijan Province in 1973, he wore jersey number 16 for his team.

== Managerial career ==
He has had several coaching experiences, primarily with Machine Sazi.
