= Attila Hejazi =

Iranian footballer and coach

Atila Hejazi
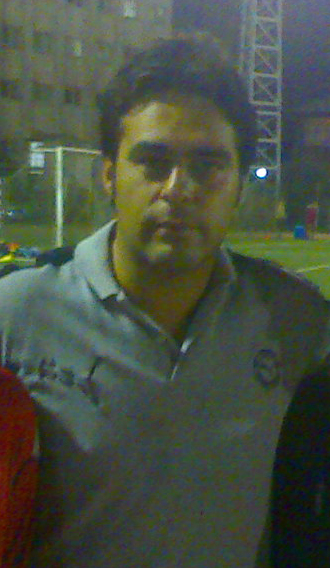

Personal information
- Full name: Atila Hejazi
- Date of birth: 13 July 1974 (age 52)
- Place of birth: Tehran, Iran
- Height: 1.88 m (6 ft 2 in)
- Position: Midfielder

Senior career*
Years	Team	Apps	(Gls)
1996–1997	Machine Sazi		
1997–1999	Esteghlal		
1999–2001	Zob Ahan		
2001–2002	Esteghlal Rasht		
2002-2003	Esteghlal Ahvaz		
2002-2004	Saba Battery		
2004-2005	Eisenstadt		

Managerial career
- 2008: Daraei
- 2010–2011: Gostaresh Foolad (assistant)
- 2011–2012: Esteghlal (assistant)
- 2013: Aluminium (assistant)
- 2013–2015: Mes Kerman (assistant)
- 2017: Naft Tehran
- * Club domestic league appearances and goals

Atila Hejazi (born 13 July 1976) is an Iranian retired football player and coach. He is the son of former Iranian football goalkeeper and manager Nasser Hejazi.

== Early life ==
Hejazi was born on 2 June 1976 in Tehran, Iran. His father was Nasser Hejazi and his mother is Behnaz Shafie. He has a sister, Atoosa. He was admitted to Shahid Beheshti University in 1995.

== Careers ==
He played for Esteghlal from 1997 to 1999. He joined Esteghlal Rasht in 2001, under management of his father and scored 3 goals in 2001–02 Iran Pro League for them.

== Personal life ==
On 15 January 2025, Hejazi came out in support of the 2025–2026 Iranian protests and responded to the high death toll on his Instagram by saying "Young people who were concerned about freedom did not deserve to die".
