= Hashem Heydari =

Iranian footballer

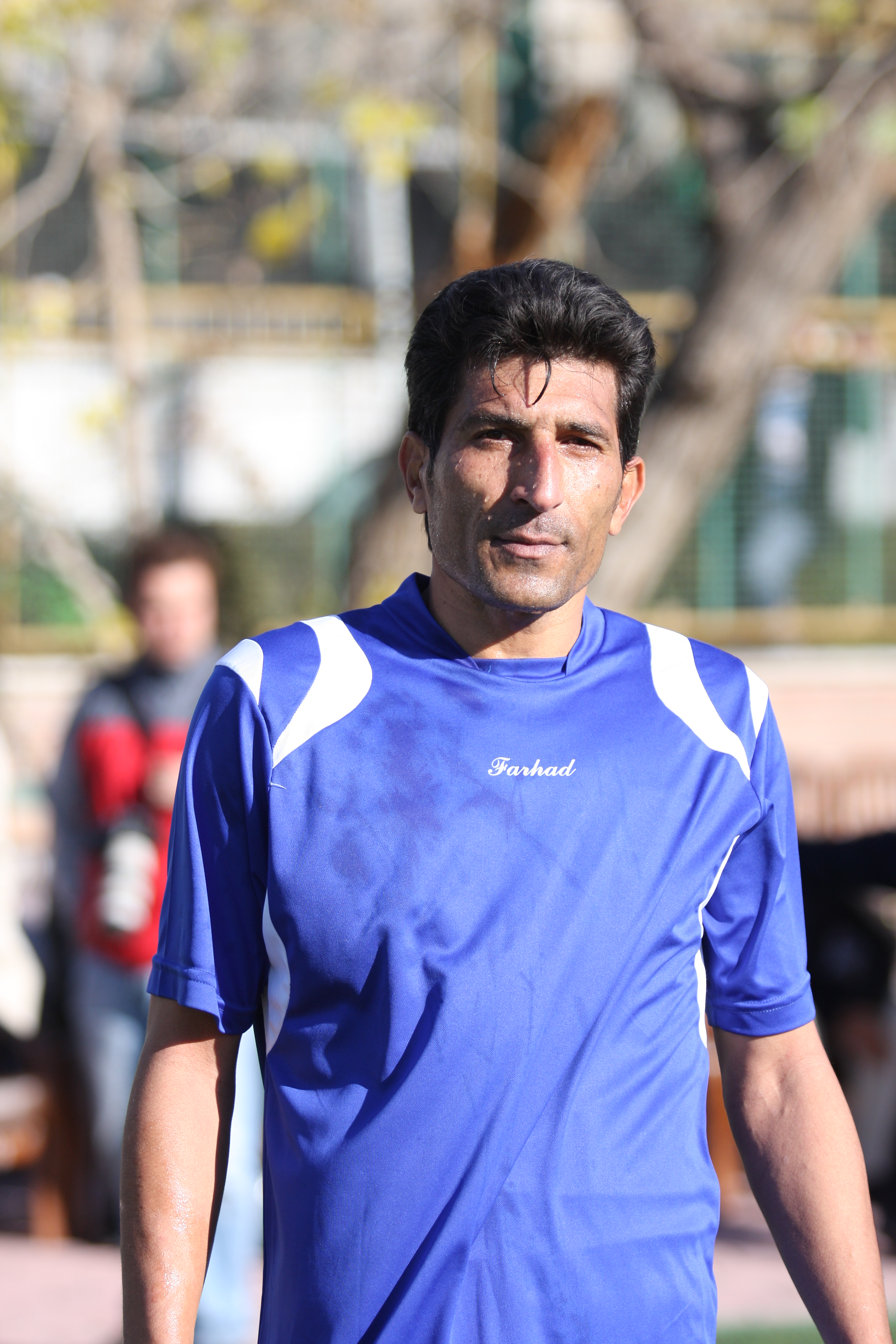

Personal information
- Full name: Hashem Heydari
- Date of birth: December 22, 1966 (age 59)
- Place of birth: Iran
- Position: Midfielder

Senior career*
Years	Team	Apps	(Gls)
1995–1996	Bahman F.C.		
1997–1999	Esteghlal FC		
2005–2006	Rah Ahan F.C.		

International career
1996–1997	Iran	5	(0)
- * Club domestic league appearances and goals

Hashem Heydari (born 22 December 1966) is an Iranian football midfielder who played for Iran and Esteghlal.
