= Mohammad Ali Yahyavi =

Iranian footballer

Personal information
- Full name: Mohammad Ali Yahyavi Kalkhoran
- Date of birth: 22 March 1962 (age 64)
- Position: Goalkeeper

Senior career*
Years	Team	Apps	(Gls)
- Esteghlal
- Aboomoslem

International career
1996	Iran		

Managerial career
- 2009–2011: Persepolis (assistant)
- * Club domestic league appearances and goals

Mohammad Ali Yahyavi Kalkhoran (Persian: محمدعلی یحیوی کلخوران, born 22 March 1962) is an Iranian football goalkeeper who played for Iran national football team and Esteghlal FC. He also played for Iran national futsal team in the 1996 FIFA Futsal World Championship.
