= Alireza Mansourian =

Iranian footballer and coach

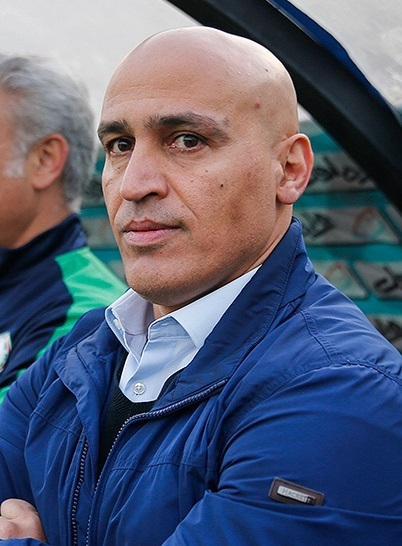
- Mansourian in 2018

Personal information
- Date of birth: 2 December 1971 (age 54)
- Place of birth: Tehran, Iran
- Height: 1.74 m (5 ft 9 in)
- Position: Midfielder

Team information
- Current team: Al-Zawraa (head coach)

Senior career*
Years	Team	Apps	(Gls)
1990–1991	Bank Sepah	0	(0)
1991–1992	Bonyad Shahid	7	(0)
1992–1993	Nirooye Zamini		
1993–1995	Pars Khodro	17	(1)
1995–1996	Esteghlal	28	(6)
1996	Balestier Central		
1996–1997	Esteghlal	16	(4)
1997	Geylang United		
1997–1998	Esteghlal	19	(3)
1998–2000	Skoda Xanthi	24	(0)
2000	Apollon Smyrnis	7	(1)
2000–2002	St. Pauli	15	(0)
2002–2008	Esteghlal	130	(8)

International career
1996–1998	Iran	46	(8)

Managerial career
- 2008–2009: Esteghlal (assistant)
- 2009: PAS Hamedan
- 2010–2014: Iran (assistant)
- 2011: Iran (caretaker)
- 2011–2014: Iran U22
- 2011–2014: Iran U23
- 2014–2016: Naft Tehran
- 2016–2017: Esteghlal
- 2018–2019: Zob Ahan
- 2020: Tractor
- 2021: Aluminium Arak
- 2021–2022: Sanat Naft
- 2023: Foolad
- 2025–2026: Al-Talaba
- 2026–: Al-Zawraa
Medal record
Representing Iran
Asian Games
Gold medal – first place	1998 Bangkok	Team competition
- * Club domestic league appearances and goals

Alireza Mansourian (Persian: علیرضا منصوريان; born 2 December 1971) is an Iranian football coach and retired player.

== Club career ==
Mansourian was born in Tehran. During his career, he played for Singapore S.League clubs: Balestier Khalsa and Geylang United along with the Iranian club Esteghlal. He moved to Greek club Skoda Xanthi in 1998 after Xanthi fans contributed to raise the amount of money needed to complete the transfer. He played for Skoda Xanthi for one and a half seasons, taking part in 23 games. In December 1999, Mansourian went to Greek club Apollon Smyrnis for six months where he played seven games and scored once. After Apollon's relegation, he continued his career in Germany with FC St. Pauli where he remained for two seasons. Finally he returned to Iran and Esteghlal where he was appointed as the team's captain. Mansourian said farewell to professional football at the end of the 2007–08 season in which Esteghlal became Hazfi Cup champions.

== International career ==
Mansourian made 46 appearances for the Iran national team and scored eight goals. He also participated in the 1998 FIFA World Cup.

== Coaching career ==
=== Early years ===
He was head coach of PAS for four months in 2009. In August 2010, Afshin Ghotbi chose Mansourian as his assistant coach for the Iran national football team. After resignation of Ghotbi as head coach of national team, Mansourian was named as interim head coach until the appointment of Carlos Queiroz. He also coached Iran in a 1–0 win against Russia.

=== Iran U-23 ===
On 28 April 2011, he became head coach of the Iranian national under-23 football team. On 2 January 2014, Mansourian resigned as head coach of Iran's under-23 side. He was replaced with Nelo Vingada.

=== Naft Tehran ===
He became manager of Iran Pro League club Naft Tehran on 31 May 2014. He led Naft Tehran to the third position and final game of Hazfi Cup in his first season at the club. They lost Hazfi Cup final to Zob Ahan. Mansourian's team also showed a good performance at AFC Champions League. Naft Tehran qualified from group stage after finishing second in their group. They also defeated Saudi Arabia's Al-Ahli in Round of 16 by away goals rule. However, they lost to Al-Ahli Dubai in Quarter-finals. At the end of the season, Esteghlal offered Mansourian to take the charge of their team after sacking of Amir Ghalenoei. The negotiations broken after Naft Tehran refused to release Mansourian. Mansourian signed a contract extension on 19 August 2015 for next two years. Naft Tehran began the season with selling of some of their squad stars, like Kamal Kamyabinia to Persepolis, Hossein Ebrahimi to Foolad and Leandro Padovani to Sepahan. Unless Naft facing financial problems during the season, Mansourian finished the season with Naft in fifth position. After the end of the season, Mansourian officially resigned and left the club.

He received offers from English team Brighton & Hove Albion in late 2015, but he turned it down to take over his former club Esteghlal Tehran. There was a tremendous pressure from the fans to bring him back to Esteghlal Tehran.

=== Esteghlal ===
On 1 June 2016, Mansourian was named as head coach of Esteghlal, signed a three-year contract with the club.

On 20 September 2017, he resigned from his role having managed the team for 16 months. Following his resignation, his assistant coach Mick McDermott took the job as caretaker manager.

=== Zob Ahan ===
On 15 November 2018, Mansourian became head coach of Zob Ahan, replacing Omid Namazi.

On 18 December 2019, Mansourian stepped down as Zob Ahan football club's coach by mutual consent.

== Career statistics ==
=== Club ===
Appearances and goals by club, season and competition
Club	Season	League		
Club	Season	Division	Apps	Goals
Skoda Xanthi	1998–99	Alpha Ethniki	17	0
Skoda Xanthi	1999–00	Alpha Ethniki	12	0
Skoda Xanthi	Total		29	0
Apollon Smyrnis	1999–00	Alpha Ethniki	6	1
FC St. Pauli	2000–01	2. Bundesliga	11	0
FC St. Pauli	2001–02	Bundesliga	4	0
FC St. Pauli	Total		15	0
Esteghlal	2002–03	Iran Pro League	16	0
Esteghlal	2003–04	Iran Pro League	14	2
Esteghlal	2004–05	Iran Pro League	26	2
Esteghlal	2005–06	Iran Pro League	25	0
Esteghlal	2006–07	Iran Pro League	23	2
Esteghlal	2007–08	Iran Pro League	26	2
Esteghlal	Total		130	8
Career total			180	9

=== International ===
Scores and results list Iran's goal tally first, score column indicates score after each Mansourian goal.

List of international goals scored by Alireza Mansourian
No.	Date	Venue	Opponent	Score	Result	Competition
1	17 June 1996	Sultan Qaboos Sports Complex, Muscat, Oman	Sri Lanka	4–0	4–0	1996 AFC Asian Cup qualification
2	11 June 1997	Azadi Stadium, Tehran, Iran	Maldives	1–0	9–0	1998 FIFA World Cup qualification
3	11 June 1997	Azadi Stadium, Tehran, Iran	Maldives	7–0	9–0	1998 FIFA World Cup qualification
4	13 June 1997	Azadi Stadium, Tehran, Iran	Syria	2–1	2–2	1998 FIFA World Cup qualification
5	17 October 1997	Azadi Stadium, Tehran, Iran	China	1–0	4–1	1998 FIFA World Cup qualification
6	14 April 1998	Takhti Stadium, Tabriz, Iran	Kuwait	1–1	1–1	Friendly
7	5 December 1998	Sri Nakhon Lamduan Stadium, Sisaket, Thailand	Laos	3–1	6–1	1998 Asian Games

== Managerial statistics ==
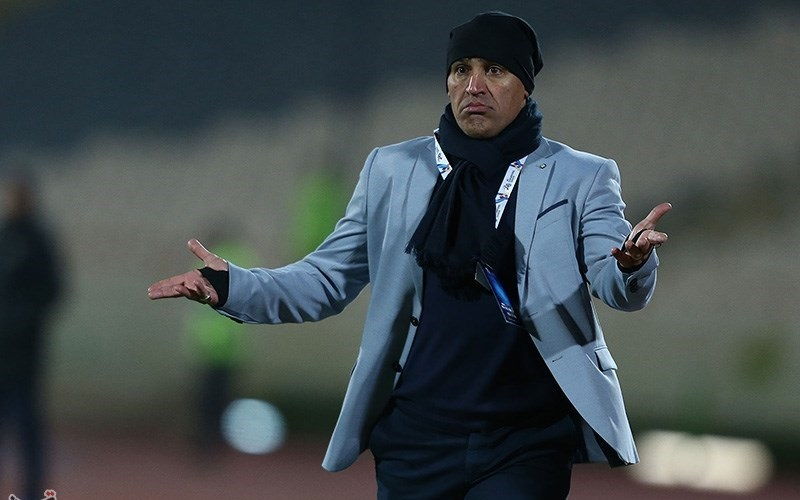
Mansourian coaching Naft Tehran against El Jaish in AFC Champions League

As of 2 December 2020

Team	From	To	Record							
Team	From	To	G	W	D	L	GF	GA	+/-	Win %
PAS	6 July 2009	4 October 2009	10	1	3	6	9	16	−7	10.00
Iran	22 January 2011	9 February 2011	1	1	0	0	1	0	+1	100.00
Iran U-23	28 April 2011	17 February 2012	3	2	0	1	3	3	+0	66.67
Iran U-22	1 March 2012	2 January 2014	14	12	1	1	33	11	+22	85.71
Naft Tehran	1 June 2014	1 June 2016	77	39	20	18	112	73	+39	50.65
Esteghlal	1 June 2016	20 September 2017	50	26	13	11	76	51	+25	52.00
Zob Ahan	15 November 2018	18 December 2019	48	16	17	15	54	54	+0	33.33
Tractor	17 September 2020	Present	4	1	2	1	2	2	+0	25.00
Total			207	98	56	53	277	190	+87	47.34

== Honours ==
=== Player ===
Esteghlal

- Iranian Football League (2): 1997–98, 2005–06, Runners-up 2003–04
- Hazfi Cup (2): 1995–96, 2007–08, Runners-up 2003–04
- AFC Champions League : Runners-Up 1998–99

Iran

1998 Asian Games Football:Goald medal

=== Manager ===
Naft Tehran

- Hazfi Cup runner-up: 2014–15

Esteghlal

- Persian Gulf Pro League runner-up: 2016–17

=== Individual ===
- IFCA Manager of the Month: March 2015
