= Fred Malekian =

Iranian Armenian footballer

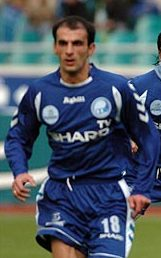

Personal information
- Full name: Fred Malekian
- Date of birth: March 21, 1974 (age 52)
- Place of birth: Tehran, Iran
- Position: Forward

Youth career
- Ararat Tehran

Senior career*
Years	Team	Apps	(Gls)
1990-1996	Ararat Tehran	70	(55)
1996–2000	Esteghlal	66	(11)

International career^{‡}
- Iran U-20
- Iran U-23

Managerial career
- Ararat Tehran(Assistant)
- * Club domestic league appearances and goals as of 22 February 2018 ‡ National team caps and goals as of 22 February 2018

Fred Malekian (Persian: فرد ملکیان, Armenian: Ֆրէդ Մելիքյան) is a retired Iranian Armenian football player.
