= Mohammad Taghavi =

Iranian footballer

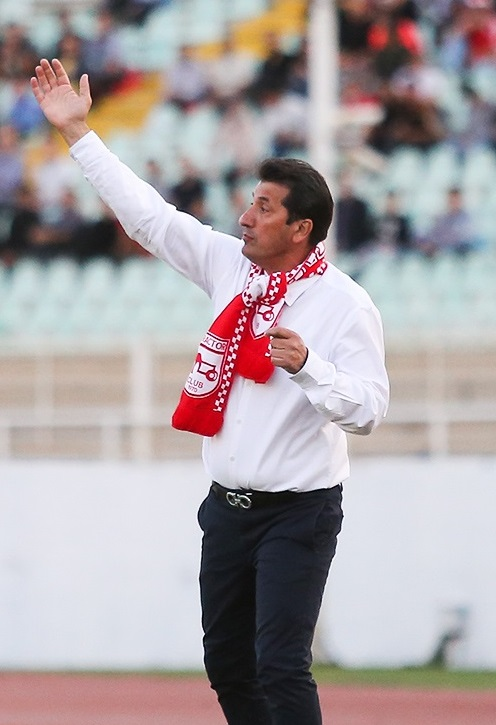

Personal information
- Full name: Mohammad Taghavi
- Date of birth: 8 January 1968 (age 58)
- Place of birth: Sari, Mazandaran province, Iran
- Position: Defender

Youth career
- Neka Choob

Senior career*
Years	Team	Apps	(Gls)
1984–1992	Homa		
1993–2000	Esteghlal		

International career
1988–1989	Iran	7	(0)

Managerial career
- 2018–2019: Tractor (interim)
- * Club domestic league appearances and goals

Mohammad Taghavi (Persian: محمد تقوی) is an Iranian retired football defender and current coach who was most recently interim manager of Tractor.

He played for Esteghlal and Iran national football team.

He was also a TV presenter who work for BBC Persian as football interpreter, when he lived in Birmingham from 2010 until 2015. He is currently a sports expert at Iran International.

His three older brothers Reza Taghavi, Hossein Taghavi and Hassan Taghavi were also football players.

== Managerial statistics ==
As of 14 December 2018

Team	From	To	Record							
Team	From	To	G	W	D	L	GF	GA	+/-	Win %
Tractor	16 September 2018	9 January 2019	9	5	2	2	17	7	+10	55.56
Total			9	5	2	2	17	7	+10	55.56

== Honours ==
=== Club ===
- Asian Club Championship

Runner up: 1

1998–99 with Esteghlal

- Azadegan League

Winner: 1

1997–98 with Esteghlal

Runner up: 2

1998–99 with Esteghlal
1999–2000 with Esteghlal

Third Place: 1

1995–96 With Esteghlal

- Hazfi Cup

Winner: 2

1995–96 with Esteghlal
1999–2000 with Esteghlal
