= Serjik Teymourian =

Iranian footballer (1974–2020)

Personal information
- Full name: Serjik Teymourian
- Date of birth: 29 May 1974
- Place of birth: Tehran, Iran
- Date of death: 29 August 2020 (aged 46)
- Place of death: Tehran, Iran
- Height: 1.74 m (5 ft 9 in)
- Position: Defensive midfielder

Youth career
- 1992–1993: Ararat
- 1993–1994: Esteghlal

Senior career*
Years	Team	Apps	(Gls)
1994–1998	Esteghlal		
1998–2000	Mainz 05	6	(0)
- * Club domestic league appearances and goals

Serjik Teymourian (Persian: سرژیک تیموریان, romanized: Seržik Teymuryân, 29 May 1974 – 29 August 2020) was an Armenian-Iranian footballer who played as a defensive midfielder for Esteghlal and German club 1. FSV Mainz 05.

== Career ==
Teymourian was a product of Ararat Tehran and joined Esteghlal academy in 1993. Then he played three seasons for Esteghlal's junior squad. He joined 1. FSV Mainz 05 in summer 1998 but was released by the club at the end of the 1999–2000 season. He was the elder brother of Andranik Teymourian and was his agent.

== Death ==
On 12 July 2020, Teymourian had an accident after a vehicle crashed into his motorcycle. He went into a coma and was hospitalised in northern Tehran. On 29 August 2020, Teymourian died at the age of 46.

== Career statistics ==
Appearances and goals by club, season and competition
Club	Season	League			Cup		Other		Total	
Club	Season	Division	Apps	Goals	Apps	Goals	Apps	Goals	Apps	Goals
Mainz 05	1998–99	2. Bundesliga	4	0	0	0	—		4	0
Mainz 05	1999–00	2. Bundesliga	2	0	2	0	—		4	0
Career total			6	0	2	0	0	0	8	0

== Honours ==
Esteghlal

- Azadegan League: 1998–99
- Hazfi Cup: 1995–96
