= Mehdi Pashazadeh =

Iranian footballer (born 1973)

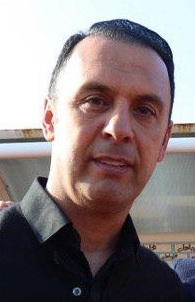

Personal information
- Full name: Mehdi Pashazadeh Bonieh
- Date of birth: 27 December 1973 (age 52)
- Place of birth: Ray, Iran
- Height: 1.87 m (6 ft 2 in)
- Position: Defender

Team information
- Current team: Naft Masjed Soleyman (manager)

Senior career*
Years	Team	Apps	(Gls)
1992–1998	Esteghlal		
1998–1999	Bayer Leverkusen	0	(0)
1999–2000	Fortuna Köln	3	(0)
2000–2003	Esteghlal		
2003–2004	Rapid Wien	28	(3)
2004–2005	Sturm Graz	4	(0)
2005–2007	Admira Wacker	33	(4)

International career
1997–1998	Iran	12	(0)

Managerial career
- 2006–2007: Admira Wacker II
- 2007–2010: Admira Wacker (assistant)
- 2010–2012: Gostaresh Sahand
- 2012: Parseh
- 2013–2015: Shahrdari Tabriz
- 2015: Aluminium Arak
- 2015–2016: Pars Jam Bushehr
- 2016: Rah Ahan
- 2017: Aluminium Arak
- 2017–2018: Nassaji Mazandaran
- 2018: Shahin Bushehr
- 2018–2019: Baadraan
- 2019: Shahrdari Mahshahr
- 2019: Sorkhpooshan Pakdasht
- 2020: Shahrdari Mahshahr
- 2020: Sepidrood (interim)
- 2020: Shahin Bushehr
- 2020–2021: PAS Hamedan
- 2021: Chooka
- 2022: Khooshe Talaei
- 2023–2024: Shahrdari Noshahr
- 2025–: Naft Masjed Soleyman
- * Club domestic league appearances and goals

Mehdi Pashazadeh (Persian: مهدی پاشازاده, born 27 December 1973) is an Iranian football coach and former player who played as a defender. He played for several clubs, including Esteghlal Tehran, Bayer Leverkusen (Germany), Fortuna Köln (Germany), Rapid Wien (Austria) and Sturm Graz (Austria). He played for the Iran national team and was a participant at the 1998 FIFA World Cup.

== Managerial career ==
In 2012, he was appointed as Parseh Tehran head coach at Azadegan League for a short period of time.

== Honours ==
=== Player ===
Esteghlal

- Iranian Football League: 1997–98
- Hazfi Cup: 2001–02

=== Manager ===
Gostaresh Foolad Sahand

- Second Division: 2011–12

Shahrdari Tabriz

- Second Division: 2013–14

Aluminium Arak

- Second Division: 2014–15

Fajr Jam

- Second Division: 2015–16

Shahin Bushehr

- Second Division: 2017–18
