= Mohammad Khorramgah =

Iranian footballer and coach

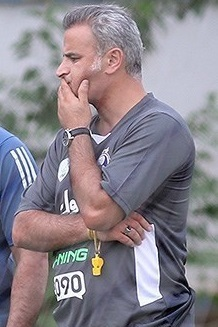
- Khorramgah in 2016

Personal information
- Date of birth: 23 September 1973 (age 53)
- Place of birth: Sabzevar, Iran
- Position: Defender

Team information
- Current team: Tractor (assistant manager)

Senior career*
Years	Team	Apps	(Gls)
- Rah Ahan
- Fajr Sepah
1994–2003	Esteghlal		
2003–2005	Fajr Sepasi		
- Balestier Khalsa
- Pegah Gilan
- Tarbiat Yazd
- Oghab
- Niroo Zamini

Managerial career
- Faraz Qom
- Hatam Ardakan
- 2011–2014: Iran U–23 (assistant)
- 2014–2016: Naft Tehran (assistant)
- 2016–2017: Esteghlal (assistant)
- 2018–2019: Zob Ahan (assistant)
- 2020–: Tractor (assistant)
- * Club domestic league appearances and goals

Mohammad Khorramgah (Persian: محمد خرمگاه; born 23 September 1973) is an Iranian football coach and retired player. He was assistant manager of Esteghlal F.C. in Iran Pro League.
