= Javad Zarincheh =

Iranian footballer (born 1966)

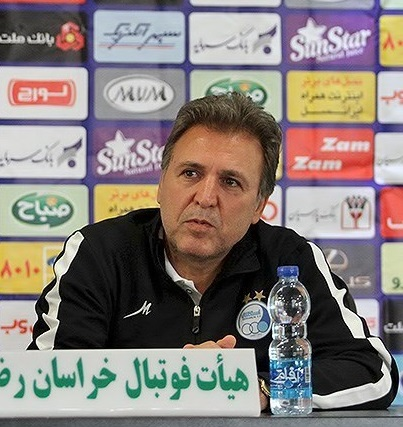
- Zarincheh in 2014

Personal information
- Date of birth: 23 July 1966 (age 60)
- Place of birth: Tehran, Iran
- Height: 5 ft 9 in (1.75 m)
- Position: Defender

Team information
- Current team: Esteghlal (team manager)

Youth career
- 1979–1980: Lokomotiv Tehran
- 1980–1982: Bootan Tehran
- 1982–1986: Gendarmerie

Senior career*
| Years | Team | Apps | (Gls) |
| 1985–1987 | Gendarmerie | | |
| 1987–1991 | Esteghlal | | |
| 1991–1993 | Keshavarz | | |
| 1993–2003 | Esteghlal | | |
| 2003–2004 | Saba Battery | | |

International career
| 1987–2000 | Iran | 80 | (1) |

Managerial career
- 1999: Esteghlal (caretaker)
- 2003: Esteghlal (caretaker)
- 2003: Esteghlal (assistant)
- 2003–2004: Saba Battery (assistant)
- 2008–2009: Sanaye Arak
- 2009: Aluminium Hormozgan
- 2010–2011: Kaveh Tehran
- 2012–2013: Rahian Kermanshah
- 2013–2014: Shahrdari Yasuj
- 2014–2015: Esteghlal (assistant)
- * Club domestic league appearances and goals

Javad Zarincheh (Persian: جواد زرینچه, born 23 July 1966) is a former Iranian football player, coach and a football administrator. He is currently team manager of Esteghlal. He played for the Iran national football team and was a participant at the 1998 FIFA World Cup.

== Playing career ==
Zarincheh was considered one of the best right wing backs in the history of Iranian football. However, late in his career he was playing as a sweeper. There was a rumor that Mohammad Mayelikohan, Iran's head coach back in the time, did not invite him to the national team, due to his hostility with Esteghlal's players. After Mayelikohan was sacked, Bijan Zolfagharnasab invited him to the national team. In the 1998 World Cup, he played as the right wing for the Iranian national team. Iran's first goal against the United States was assisted by Zaricheh.

The 1998 World Cup competition was his last competition with the national team.

== Coaching career ==
Zarincheh was chosen as the assistant manager of Esteghlal for 2014–2015 season.

== Personal life ==
On 9 February 2026, in the midst of the 2025–2026 Iranian protests, Zarincheh publicly objected to being included on a list of supporters of the 1979 Islamic Revolution by the Ministry of Sport and Youth, ahead of the Revolution's anniversary.

== Career statistics ==
| # | Date | Venue | Opponent | Score | Result | Competition |
|---|---|---|---|---|---|---|
| 1. | 1 June 1993 | Azadi Stadium, Tehran, Iran | Pakistan | 5–0 | W | 1993 ECO Cup |
Correct as of 24 July 2021

== Honours ==
=== Player ===
Esteghlal

- Iranian league (3): 1989–90, 1997–98, 2000–01
- Hazfi Cup (2): 1995–96, 1999–00

== Notes ==
Sporting positions
| Preceded by Nader Mohammadkhani | Iran national football team captain 1999–2000 | Succeeded by Ali Daei |
