= Edmond Akhtar =

Iranian-Armenian footballer

Personal information
- Full name: Edmond Akhtar
- Date of birth: 18 November 1971 (age 54)
- Place of birth: Tehran, Iran
- Position: Forward

Senior career*
Years	Team	Apps	(Gls)
1991–1993	Ararat Tehran		
1994–1999	Esteghlal		
1999–2000	Pas Tehran		
2006–2007	Sanati Kaveh		

International career^{‡}
1996	Iran	6	(2)
- * Club domestic league appearances and goals as of 22 February 2012 ‡ National team caps and goals as of 22 February 2012

Edmond Akhtar (Persian: ادموند اختر) is a retired Iranian-Armenian football player.

== Career ==
In 1991, Akhtar started his career with Ararat Tehran of the Azadegan League. After spending several years with the team, Akhtar transferred to Tehran based side Esteghlal F.C. While at the club, Akhtar became a fan favorite, leading the team in scoring and becoming one of the top scorers in the 1994–95 season. After spending several successful seasons with the team, Akhtar moved to Pas Tehran F.C. in 2000. Spending only one season with the team, Akhtar retired. He attempted a comeback in 2006, signing with second division side Sanati Kaveh F.C.

== International ==
Akhtar's success as a member of Esteghlal F.C. earned him several caps with Iranian national football team. In 1996, he made his international debut against Turkmenistan. Akhtar scored his first goal several games later, notching an equalizer for Iran against the Kuwait national football team.

== External sources ==
- Profile at Team Milli
