= Keshavarz F.C. =

Iranian football club

Keshavarz Football Club (Persian: باشگاه فوتبال کشاورز) is a defunct Iranian football club that was based in Tehran, Iran. It was owned by the Ministry of Agriculture.

== Managers ==
- Ali Targholizadeh (1988–1991)
- Fereydoun Asgarzadeh (1992–1993)
- Hans-Jürgen Gede (1993–1994)
- Sirous Ghayeghran (1994–1996)
- Amir Ghalenoei
