= Polyacryl Esfahan F.C. =

Iranian football club

Polyacryl Esfahan
- Full name: Polyacryl Esfahan Football Club
- Founded: 1981; 41 years ago

Polyacryl Football Club (Persian: باشگاه فوتبال پلی اکریل اصفهان) is a defunct football club that was based in Esfahan, Iran. The team still operates at youth level.

== Coaches ==
- Hossein Charkhabi (1995–1997)
- Firouz Karimi (1997–98)
