= Bahman F.C. =

Iranian football club

Bahman
- Full name: Bahman Karaj Football Club
- Founded: 1994
- Dissolved: 2000
- Ground: Shariati Stadium, Karaj
- Capacity: 20,000
- 1999–2000: Azadegan League, 8th
Home colours	Away colours

Bahman Karaj Football Club (Persian: بهمن كرج, Behmin Kârej) was an Iranian football club based in Karaj, Iran. In 1993, the rights and licenses of two football clubs Vahdat F.C. and Bank Sepah F.C. were purchased and Bahman F.C. entered the league. In the early years, the bulk of players were from Pas Tehran F.C.'s winning squads of 1991 and 1992.

== History ==
Bahman was founded in 1994 and operated until the end of the 1999–2000 Azadegan League season, after which their shares were bought by now Iran Pro League side Paykan.

=== Continental history ===
Season	Competition	Round	Club	Home	Away	Aggregate
1995	Asian Cup Winners' Cup	First round	Bye			
1995	Asian Cup Winners' Cup	Second round	(Kazakhstan) Vostok	2–2	1–0	3–2
1995	Asian Cup Winners' Cup	Quarterfinal	(Iraq) Al-Talaba	0–1	1–1	1–2

== Honours ==
=== Domestic ===
- Hazfi Cup:

Winners (1):1993–94

Runners-Up (2):1996–97,1999–00

- Azadegan League:

Runners-Up (2): 1995–96, 1996–97

=== Invitational ===
- (India) DCM Trophy
  - Winners (1): 1994–95

== Managers ==
- Firouz Karimi (1994–1995)
- Farhad Kazemi (1995–2000)
