= 2013–14 PAS Hamedan F.C. season =

PAS Hamedan
2013–14 season
- Chairman: (Iran) Abdolhamid Ramezani
- Manager: (Iran) Mojtaba Khorshidi (2013) (Iran) Mohsen Ashouri (2014)
- Stadium: Qods Stadium (Hamedan)
- Azadegan League: N/A
Home colours	Away colours

The 2013–14 season is PAS Hamedan's 3rd season in the Azadegan League.

== First-team squad ==
=== First-team squad ===
as of September 21, 2013 Note: Flags indicate national team as defined under FIFA eligibility rules; some limited exceptions apply. Players may hold more than one non-FIFA nationality.

No.	Pos.	Nation	Player
1	GK	IRN	Jalil Ahmadi
2	DF	IRN	Mostafa Yousef Alizadeh
3	MF	IRN	Abolghasem Pourasadollah
4	MF	IRN	Babak Razi
5	FW	IRN	Mohammad Mirtorabi
6	MF	IRN	Omid Khouraj (captain)
7	DF	IRN	Mohsen Pourhaji
8	MF	IRN	Mehrdad Rezaei
9	FW	IRN	Lefteh Hamidi
10	FW	IRN	Saber Mirghorbani
11	MF	IRN	Mehdi Seifi
13	DF	IRN	Kaveh Zangian
14	DF	IRN	Javad Babaei
15	DF	IRN	Mohammad Alavi
16	FW	IRN	Kosha Bahaeipour
17	FW	IRN	Mojtaba Mahboub-Mojaz

No.	Pos.	Nation	Player
10	FW	IRN	Amr Hossein Nahal
19	FW	IRN	Mostafa Gheisari
20	FW	IRN	Fakhrodin Shahroei
21	MF	IRN	Amir Godari
22	GK	IRN	Mohammad Niaraki
23	MF	IRN	Mostafa Agheli
24	FW	IRN	Mostafa Solgi
25	MF	IRN	Amin Moosavi
26	DF	IRN	Milad Khodayari
27	DF	IRN	Nader Hooshyar
28	DF	IRN	Amin Rahimi
29	FW	IRN	Mojtaba Asgari
30	FW	IRN	Amin Soohanian
32	DF	IRN	Emad Ghasemi
—		IRN	Shahin Soleimani
—	MF	IRN	Hassan Ashjari

For recent transfers, see List of Iranian football transfers summer 2013.

== Transfers ==
=== Summer ===
In: Note: Flags indicate national team as defined under FIFA eligibility rules; some limited exceptions apply. Players may hold more than one non-FIFA nationality.

No.	Pos.	Nation	Player
—	DF	IRN	Omid Khouraj (from Foolad Yazd)
—	DF	IRN	Nader Hooshyar (from Rah Ahan Sorinet)
—	MF	IRN	Ali Haghdoost (from Aboomoslem)
—	MF	IRN	Emad Ghasemi (from Saipa Shomal)
—	MF	IRN	Mostafa Agheli (from Shahrdari Bandar Abbas)
—	MF	IRN	Mehdi Seifi (from Aluminium Hormozgan)
—	GK	IRN	Mohammad Najjar Niaraki (from Niroye Zamini)
—	MF	IRN	Morteza Hashemizadeh (from Shahrdari Tabriz)
—	FW	IRN	Fakhroddin Shahrouei (from Padideh Shandiz)
—	FW	IRN	Mojtaba Mahboub-Mojaz (from Parseh Tehran)
—	MF	IRN	Kaveh Zangian (from Gostaresh Foolad)
—	MF	IRN	Mojtaba Asgari (from Varesh Bandar Gaz)
—	MF	IRN	Mostafa Gheisari (from Alvand Hamedan)
—	FW	IRN	Amir Hossein Nahal (from Sanat Sari)
—	FW	IRN	Kousha Bahaeipour (from Tose'eh va Omran Ferdos)
—	FW	IRN	Saber Mirghorbani (from Gostaresh Foolad)

Out: Note: Flags indicate national team as defined under FIFA eligibility rules; some limited exceptions apply. Players may hold more than one non-FIFA nationality.

No.	Pos.	Nation	Player
13	DF	IRN	Mohsen Rabikhah (to Tractor Sazi)
44	MF	IRN	Karim Shaverdi (to Esteghlal Khuzestan)
9	FW	IRN	Meghdad Ghobakhlou (to Saipa)
7	DF	IRN	Oveis Kordjahan (to Zob Ahan)
8	MF	IRN	Vahid Aliabadi (to Zob Ahan)
10	MF	IRN	Morteza Tabrizi (to Zob Ahan)
11	DF	IRN	Abbas Kazemian (to Sanat Naft Abadan)
4	DF	IRN	Mojtaba Shiri (to Sanat Naft Abadan)
22	GK	IRN	Masoud Gholamalizad (Released)
20	DF	IRN	Hamid Reza Fathi (Released)
5	DF	IRN	Mohammad Mir Torabi (Released)
33	GK	IRN	Mohammad Hossein Naeiji (Released)
12	MF	IRN	Ahmad Taghavi (Released)
14	MF	IRN	Ahmad Jafari (Released)
38	MF	IRN	Ali Matouri (Released)

== Competitions ==
=== Results summary ===
Overall								Home						Away					
Pld	W	D	L	GF	GA	GD	Pts	W	D	L	GF	GA	GD	W	D	L	GF	GA	GD
24	8	5	11	22	28	−6	29	8	2	2	15	8	+7	0	3	9	7	20	−13

Last updated: 13 September 2013.
Source: http://www.persianleague.com/statistics.html

=== Results by round ===
Round	1	2	3	4	5	6	7	8	9	10	11	12	13	14	15	16	17	18	19	20	21	22	23	24	25	26
Ground	H	A	-	H	A	H	A	H	A	H	A	H	A	A	H	-	A	H	A	H	A	H	A	H	A	H
Result	W	L	-	D	L	W	L	W	L	W	D	L	L	L	W	-	L	L	L	D	D	W	D	W	L	W
Position	3	6	7	8	10	5	7	3	6	6	5	7	11	12	9	10	11	11	11	12	12	11	10	9	10	9

Updated to match(es) played on 29 August 2013. Source: "Ipl". Archived from the original on 2012-09-15.
A = Away; H = Home; W = Win; D = Draw; L = Loss

=== Matches ===
Win Draw Loss Bye

Date Round	Home	Score	Away	Location

25 September 2013 1	PAS Hamedan	1 – 0	Naft Masjed Soleyman	Hamedan
15:30 UTC+04:30	Mohsen Pourhaji 62'; Mehdi Seifi (yellow card); Abolghasem Pourasadollah (yellow card)	Summary	Ali Jahangiri (yellow card); Sadegh Sadeghi (yellow card); Hakim Ansari (yellow card)	Stadium: Qods Hamedan; Referee: Rasoul Rahbarfam

30 September 2013 2	Aluminium Hormozgan	3 – 0	PAS Hamedan	Bandar Abbas
15:30 UTC+04:30	Maysam Majidi 54'; Hossein Kazemi 88'; Mohammad Reza Pourmohammad 91'	Summary		Stadium: Persian Gulf Stadium; Referee: Hamrang

3	v

11 October 2013 4	PAS Hamedan	0 – 0	Yazd Looleh	Hamedan
15:15 UTC+04:30	Kaveh Zangian (yellow card) 11'	Summary	Mojtaba Mehrjodi (yellow card) 58'; Abolfazl Ghorbani (yellow card) 74'; Sajjad Erfani (yellow card) 76'; Mehdi Taefi (yellow card)	Stadium: Qods Hamedan; Referee: Sharifi

16 October 2013 5	Paykan Tehran	3 – 2	PAS Hamedan	Tehran
14:45 UTC+04:30	Alireza Jarahkar 17'; Hamid Reza Fathi 29'; Ali Amiri 79' (pen.)	Summary	Mehdi Seifi 2'; Mostafa Agheli 75'; Emad Ghasemi (yellow card); Babak Razi (red card)	Stadium: Paykan Shahr; Referee: Nouri

22 October 2013 6	PAS Hamedan	2 – 1	Rahian Kermanshah	Hamedan
15:00 UTC+04:30	Mojtaba Mahboub-Mojaz (yellow card) 57'; Mojtaba Mahboub-Mojaz 67'; Mohsen Pourhaji 75'; Jalil Ahmadi (yellow card) 95'	Summary	Reza Nabizadeh 42'; Ambuno Asheel (yellow card) 73'; Farzad Izad (yellow card) 78'	Stadium: Qods Hamedan; Referee: Afshar

28 October 2013 7	Iranjavan Bushehr	1 – 0	PAS Hamedan	Bushehr
15:00 UTC+04:30	Ezzat Poorghaz (yellow card) 22'; Vahid Nemati 53'; Sadegh Geshni (red card) 69'	Summary	Kaveh Zangian (yellow card) 45'; Omid Khouraj (red card) 78'	Stadium: Shahid Beheshti Stadium; Referee: Farrokhimehr

3 November 2013 8	PAS Hamedan	2 – 0	Mes Rafsanjan	Hamedan
14:45 UTC+04:30	Amir Godari (yellow card) 40'; Mojtaba Mahboub-Mojaz 61'; Mostafa Agheli 75'	Summary	Amir Khodamoradi (yellow card) 17'; Farid Taleghani (yellow card) 30'	Stadium: Qods Hamedan; Referee: Hajbabaei

10 November 2013 9	Al-Badr Kong	2 – 1	PAS Hamedan	Kong
14:45 UTC+04:30	Mohammadi Sepehr Saber (yellow card); Rasool Kor (yellow card); Mohammad Ali Ashoorizad (yellow card)	Summary	Mohsen Pourhaji 33' (pen.); Mojtaba Mahboub-Mojaz (yellow card)	Stadium: Al-Badr Kong Stadium; Referee: Mahdavi

17 November 2013 10	PAS Hamedan	1 – 0	Naft Gachsaran	Hamedan
14:30 UTC+04:30	Fakhrodin Shahroei 45'; Javad Babaei (yellow card) 78'; Lefteh Hamidi (yellow card) 92'; Mehrdad Rezaei (yellow card)	Summary	Atabak Namazi (yellow card) 91'	Stadium: Qods Hamedan; Referee: Mehdi Marjanpour

23 November 2013 11	Saipa Shomal	0 – 0	PAS Hamedan	Sari
14:00 UTC+04:30	Mojtaba Noroozi (yellow card); Hadi Riahi (yellow card)	Summary		Stadium: Shohada Stadium (Sari); Referee: Arghavani

30 November 2013 12	PAS Hamedan	0 – 2	Parseh Tehran	Hamedan
14:15 UTC+04:30	Omid Khouraj (yellow card); Emad Ghasemi (yellow card); Mehrdad Rezaei (yellow card)	Summary	Ali Ghorbani 66'; Mojtaba Mamshali 75'; Alireza Mirshafieian (yellow card)	Stadium: Qods Hamedan; Referee: Daneshmehr

28 December 2013 13	Aboomoslem Khorasan	2 – 1	PAS Hamedan	Mashhad
14:00 UTC+04:30	Adel Sarshar 8'; Behnam Beiranvand 16'	Summary	Ehsan Pirhadi 62'	Stadium: Samen Stadium; Referee: Zargar

4 January 2014 14	Naft Masjed Soleyman	2 – 0	PAS Hamedan	Masjed-Soleyman
14:15 UTC+04:30	Hakim Nasari 29'; Farzad Mohammadi 85'; Masood Ghanavati (yellow card)	Summary	Emad Ghasemi (yellow card); Nader Hooshyar (yellow card)	Stadium: Takhti Stadium (Masjed soleyman); Referee: Gholamreza Jabari

12 January 2014 15	PAS Hamedan	1 – 0	Aluminium Hormozgan	Hamedan
14:00 UTC+04:30	Mostafa Solgi 77'; Babak Bidari (yellow card); Ahmad Moosavi (yellow card)	Summary	Ahmad Jafari (yellow card); Afshin Chavoshi (yellow card)	Stadium: Qods Hamedan; Referee: Seyed Mehdi Seyed Ali

16	v

26 January 2014 17	Yazd Looleh	1 – 0	PAS Hamedan	Yazd
14:00 UTC+04:30	Mohammad Rayat 78'	Summary		Stadium: Shahid Nassiri Stadium; Referee: Rouhollah Sharifi

2 February 2014 18	PAS Hamedan	0 – 2	Paykan Tehran	Hamedan
14:15 UTC+04:30	Ehsan Pirhadi (yellow card) 90'	Summary	Keyvan Vahdani 10'; Mohammad Borjlou (yellow card) 11'; Alireza Mohammad (yellow card) 22'; Keyvan Vahdani (yellow card) 33'; Jahangir Asgari 46' (pen.)	Stadium: Qods Hamedan; Referee: Rasoul Rahbarfam

9 February 2014 19	Rahian Kermanshah	1 – 0	PAS Hamedan	Kermanshah
14:15 UTC+04:30	Hamed Hajati 23'; Amin Hejazi (yellow card); Hassan Ramonzadeh (yellow card); Yaser Vakili (yellow card); Hamed Assadpour (yellow card)	Summary	Mehrdad Rezaei (red card)	Stadium: Azadi Stadium (Kermanshah); Referee: Vahid Kazemi

16 February 2014 20	PAS Hamedan	1 – 1	Iranjavan Bushehr	Hamedan
14:30 UTC+04:30	Mojtaba Mahboub-Mojaz 80'; Kaveh Zangian (yellow card)		Mostafa Bayat 91'; Hamid Reza Fathi (yellow card); Sadegh Geshni (yellow card); Mostafa Bayat (red card)	Stadium: Qods Hamedan; Referee: Vasilehbar

23 February 2014 21	Mes Rafsanjan	2 – 2	PAS Hamedan	Rafsanjan
14:30 UTC+04:30	Ali Alizadeh 20'; Sajjad Heydari Moghadam 50'	Summary	Mojtaba Mahboub-Mojaz 70'; Mojtaba Mahboub-Mojaz 90'	Stadium: Shohadaye Noushabad Stadium; Referee: Jahanbazi

1 March 2014 22	PAS Hamedan	1 – 0	Al-Badr Kong	Hamedan
15:00 UTC+04:30	Emad Ghasemi (yellow card) 10'; Mojtaba Mahboub-Mojaz 23'; Hassan Ashjari (yellow card) 51'	Summary		Stadium: Qods Hamedan

7 March 2014 23	Naft Gachsaran	1 – 1	PAS Hamedan	Dogonbadan
15:15 UTC+04:30	Peyman Ranjbari 23'; Mohammad Khanahmadi (yellow card); Milad Jafari (yellow card)	Summary	Mojtaba Mahboub-Mojaz 51'; Emad Ghasemi (yellow card) 67'; Jalil Ahmadi (yellow card) 80'	Stadium: Naft Complex; Referee: Javad Sharafi

14 March 2014 24	PAS Hamedan	1 – 0	Persepolis Shomal	Hamedan
15:00 UTC+04:30	Ehsan Pirhadi 45'; Jalil Ahmadi (yellow card) 71'; Mohammad Alavi (yellow card) 90'; Hassan Ashjari (red card) 90'	Summary	Hadi Khodadadi (yellow card)	Stadium: Qods Hamedan; Referee: Jamshid Daneshmehr

31 March 2014 25	Parseh Tehran	2 – 0	PAS Hamedan	Tehran
16:15 UTC+04:30	Milad Poorsafshekan 34'; Mohammad-Esmail Nazari 66'	Summary	Emad Ghasemi (red card) 36'; Mojtaba Mahboub-Mojaz (red card) 59'	Stadium: Kargaran Stadium; Referee: Akbarian

8 April 2014 26	PAS Hamedan	5 – 2	Aboomoslem Khorasan	Hamedan
16:15 UTC+04:30	Mohsen Pourhaji 36'; Ehsan Pirhadi 41'; Mehrdad Rezaei 56'; Nader Hooshyar (yellow card) 60'; Omid Khouraj (yellow card) 70'; Mehrdad Rezaei 71'; Ehsan Pirhadi 73'	Summary	Hamed Bakhtiari 13'; Elias Salehi 85'	Stadium: Qods Hamedan; Referee: Gholamreza Jabbari

== See also ==
- 2013–14 Azadegan League
- 2013–14 Hazfi Cup
