= 2012–13 PAS Hamedan F.C. season =

PAS Hamedan
2012–13 season
- Chairman: (Iran) Abdolhamid Ramezani
- Manager: (Croatia) Vinko Begović (2012) (Iran) Omid Tayeri (2013)
- Stadium: Qods Stadium (Hamedan)
- Azadegan League: 3rd
- Top goalscorer: Meghdad Ghobakhlou (9)
| Home colours | Away colours |

The 2012–13 season is PAS Hamedan's 2nd season in the Azadegan League. The team was managed by Vinko Begović and captained by Mohammad Alavi. Vinko Begović was replaced with Omid Tayeri in the middle of the season.

== First-team squad ==
as of September 8, 2012 Note: Flags indicate national team as defined under FIFA eligibility rules; some limited exceptions apply. Players may hold more than one non-FIFA nationality.

| No. | Pos. | Nation | Player |
|---|---|---|---|
| 1 | GK | IRN | Jalil Ahmadi |
| 2 | DF | IRN | Mostafa Yousef Alizadeh |
| 3 | MF | IRN | Abolghasem Pourasadollah |
| 4 | DF | IRN | Mojtaba Shiri |
| 5 | FW | IRN | Mohammad Mirzaei |
| 6 | MF | IRN | Babak Razi |
| 7 | DF | IRN | Oveis Kordjahan |
| 8 | MF | IRN | Vahid Aliabadi |
| 9 | FW | IRN | Meghdad Ghobakhlou |
| 10 | MF | IRN | Morteza Tabrizi |
| 11 | DF | IRN | Abbas Kazemian |
| 12 | MF | IRN | Ahmad Taghavi |
| 13 | DF | IRN | Mohsen Rabikhah |
| 14 | DF | IRN | Ahmad Jafari |

| No. | Pos. | Nation | Player |
|---|---|---|---|
| 15 | MF | IRN | Mohammad Alavi (captain) |
| 16 | MF | IRN | Javad Babaei |
| 17 | DF | IRN | Mehrdad Rezaei |
| 18 | FW | IRN | Sajjad Khosravi |
| 19 | FW | IRN | Hossein Jodaki |
| 20 | DF | IRN | Hamid Reza Fathi |
| 21 | MF | IRN | Amir Godari |
| 22 | GK | IRN | Masoud Gholamalizad |
| 23 | DF | IRN | Mohsen Pourhaji |
| 33 | GK | IRN | Kourosh Amir Yousefi |
| 38 | FW | IRN | Ali Matouri |
| 40 | FW | IRN | Lefteh Hamidi |
| 44 | DF | IRN | Karim Shaverdi |
| — | GK | IRN | Mohammad Hossein Naeiji |

== Transfers ==
=== Summer ===
In: Note: Flags indicate national team as defined under FIFA eligibility rules; some limited exceptions apply. Players may hold more than one non-FIFA nationality.

| No. | Pos. | Nation | Player |
|---|---|---|---|
| 15 | MF | IRN | Mohammad Alavi (from Machine Sazi Tabriz) |
| 4 | DF | IRN | Mojtaba Shiri (from Persepolis) |
| 20 | DF | IRN | Hamid Reza Fathi (from Naft Tehran) |
| 9 | FW | IRN | Meghdad Ghobakhlou (from Mes Kerman) |
| 12 | DF | IRN | Jalal Akbari (from Sepahan) |
| 8 | MF | IRN | Vahid Aliabadi (from Mes Sarcheshmeh) |
| 40 | FW | IRN | Lefteh Hamidi (from Shahrdari Arak) |
| 22 | GK | IRN | Masoud Gholamalizad (from Saba Qom) |
| 7 | DF | IRN | Oveis Kordjahan (from Mes Sarcheshmeh) |
| 23 | DF | IRN | Mohsen Pourhaji (from Nassaji Mazandaran) |
| 3 | DF | IRN | Abolghasem Pourasadollah (from Nassaji Mazandaran) |
| 18 | FW | IRN | Sajjad Khosravi (from Shirin Faraz) |
| 21 | FW | IRN | Amir Godari (from Niroye Zamini) |
| 14 | DF | IRN | Ahmad Jafari (from Sepahan) |
| 11 | DF | IRN | Abbas Kazemian (from Fajr Sepasi) |
| 19 | FW | IRN | Hossein Jodaki (from Datis Lorestan) |
| 17 | FW | IRN | Mehrdad Rezaei (from Foolad Novin) |
| 38 | FW | IRN | Ali Matouri (from Shahrdari Bandar Abbas) |

Out: Note: Flags indicate national team as defined under FIFA eligibility rules; some limited exceptions apply. Players may hold more than one non-FIFA nationality.

| No. | Pos. | Nation | Playerc |
|---|---|---|---|
| — | DF | IRN | Pouria Seifpanahi (to Mes Kerman) |
| — | MF | TJK | Akmal Kholmatov (Released) |
| — | MF | SRB | Saša Kolunija (Released, to Gahar Zagros) |
| — | FW | IRN | Amin Motevaselzadeh (to Damash) |
| — | DF | IRN | Nader Ahmadi (to Paykan) |
| — | DF | IRN | Alireza Mirshafian (to Paykan) |
| 1 | GK | IRN | Ali Nazarmohammadi (to Nassaji) |

== Competitions ==
=== Results summary ===
| Overall | | | | | | | | Home | | | | | | Away | | | | | |
| Pld | W | D | L | GF | GA | GD | Pts | W | D | L | GF | GA | GD | W | D | L | GF | GA | GD |
|---|---|---|---|---|---|---|---|---|---|---|---|---|---|---|---|---|---|---|---|
| 26 | 14 | 2 | 10 | 25 | 18 | +7 | 44 | 9 | 1 | 3 | 14 | 9 | +5 | 5 | 1 | 7 | 11 | 9 | +2 |

Last updated: 13 September 2012.
Source: http://www.persianleague.com/statistics.html

=== Results by round ===
| Round | 1 | 2 | 3 | 4 | 5 | 6 | 7 | 8 | 9 | 10 | 11 | 12 | 13 | 14 | 15 | 16 | 17 | 18 | 19 | 20 | 21 | 22 | 23 | 24 | 25 | 26 |
|---|---|---|---|---|---|---|---|---|---|---|---|---|---|---|---|---|---|---|---|---|---|---|---|---|---|---|
| Ground | H | A | H | A | H | A | H | A | H | A | H | A | H | A | H | A | H | A | H | A | H | A | H | A | H | A |
| Result | W | W | W | L | W | L | W | L | W | W | L | L | W | L | D | W | L | D | W | W | L | L | W | D | W | W |
| Position | 2 | 1 | 1 | 1 | 1 | 2 | 1 | 3 | 2 | 1 | 1 | 5 | 3 | 4 | 5 | 4 | 4 | 5 | 5 | 3 | 4 | 5 | 5 | 5 | 4 | 3 |

Updated to match(es) played on 29 August 2012. Source: "Ipl". Archived from the original on 2012-09-15.
A = Away; H = Home; W = Win; D = Draw; L = Loss

=== Standings ===
Group B
| Pos | Team | Pld | W | D | L | GF | GA | GD | Pts | Promotion or relegation |
|---|---|---|---|---|---|---|---|---|---|---|
| 1 | Sh. Tabriz (R) | 26 | 13 | 8 | 5 | 33 | 20 | +13 | 47 | Relegation to 2nd Division (Note: Shahrdari Tabriz was relegated to the 2nd Division due to match-fixing scandal.) |
| 2 | Est. Khuzestan (P) | 26 | 13 | 7 | 6 | 24 | 18 | +6 | 46 | Promotion to 2013–14 Iran Pro League |
| 3 | PAS Hamedan (Q) | 26 | 14 | 3 | 9 | 25 | 18 | +7 | 45 | Azadegan League 2012–13 play-off |
| 4 | Sh. Yasouj | 26 | 12 | 6 | 8 | 31 | 20 | +11 | 42 | |
| 5 | Rahian Kermanshah | 26 | 10 | 11 | 5 | 27 | 19 | +8 | 41 | |
| 6 | Niroye Zamini | 26 | 12 | 4 | 10 | 29 | 27 | +2 | 40 | |
| 7 | Iranjavan | 26 | 8 | 13 | 5 | 27 | 20 | +7 | 37 | |
| 8 | Sh. Bandar Abbas | 26 | 9 | 10 | 7 | 29 | 25 | +4 | 37 | |
| 9 | Saipa Shomal | 26 | 11 | 4 | 11 | 22 | 28 | −6 | 37 | |
| 10 | Foolad Yazd | 26 | 8 | 7 | 11 | 28 | 26 | +2 | 31 | |
| 11 | Mes Rafsanjan | 26 | 7 | 9 | 10 | 14 | 21 | −7 | 30 | |
| 12 | Hafari Ahvaz (R) | 26 | 6 | 8 | 12 | 40 | 42 | −2 | 26 | Relegation to 2nd Division |
| 13 | Bargh Shiraz (R) | 26 | 4 | 7 | 15 | 22 | 44 | −22 | 19 | Relegation to 2nd Division |
| 14 | Yadavaran Shalamcheh (R) | 26 | 3 | 7 | 16 | 12 | 35 | −23 | 16 | Relegation to 3rd Division (Note: Yadavaran Shalamcheh was relegated to the 3rd Division due to match-fixing scandal.) |

Updated to match(es) played on 16 April 2013. Source: Varzesh3.com
Rules for classification: 1) points; 2) goal difference; 3) number of goals scored.
(P) Promoted; (Q) Qualified for the phase indicated; (R) Relegated

=== Matches ===
Win Draw Loss Postponed

| Date Round | Home | Score | Away | Location |

| 13 September 2012 1 | PAS Hamedan | 2–1 | Shahrdari Tabriz | Hamedan |
| 16:30 UTC+04:30 | Meghdad Ghobakhlou 67'; Abolghasem Pourasadollah 90+4' | Summary | Kamal Kamyabinia 72'; Kamal Kamyabinia (yellow card); Mohammad Borjlou (yellow card); Ali Yoonesi (red card) 93' | Stadium: Qods Hamedan; Attendance: 3,000; Referee: Mohammad Kamani |

| 20 September 2012 2 | Shahrdari Bandar Abbas | 1–3 | PAS Hamedan | Bandar Abbas |
| 16:45 UTC+04:30 | Shahin Majidi 70' | Summary | Meghdad Ghobakhlou 1'; Meghdad Ghobakhlou 58'; Mohsen Rabikhah 75'; Abbas Kazemian (yellow card); Morteza Tabrizi (yellow card) | Stadium: Khalij Fars Stadium; Attendance: N/A; Referee: Javad Rahimzadeh |

| 28 September 2012 3 | PAS Hamedan | 1–0 | Saipa Shomal | Hamedan |
| 15:15 UTC+04:30 | Meghdad Ghobakhlou (yellow card) 12'; Ali Matouri (yellow card) 31'; Meghdad Ghobakhlou 52'; Mehrdad Rezaei (yellow card) 91' | Summary | Hadi Esmaeili (yellow card) 20'; Hadi Riahi (yellow card) 29' | Stadium: Qods Hamedan; Referee: Melki |

| 5 October 2012 4 | Iranjavan | 1–0 | PAS Hamedan | Bushehr |
| 15:45 UTC+04:30 | Mohammad Gholamin 89'; Khosrow Piroozian (yellow card); Amir Nasrollahzadeh (yellow card) | Summary | Meghdad Ghobakhlou (yellow card); Sajjad Khosravi (yellow card); Ali Matouri (yellow card) | Stadium: Shahid Beheshti Stadium; Referee: Javad Sharafi |

| 11 October 2012 5 | PAS Hamedan | 1–0 | Foolad Yazd | Hamedan |
| 15:00 UTC+04:30 | Meghdad Ghobakhlou 85' | Summary | Mohsen Zarezadeh (yellow card) 24' | Stadium: Qods Hamedan; Referee: Zargar |

| 18 October 2012 6 | Bargh Shiraz | 1–0 | PAS Hamedan | Shiraz |
| 14:45 UTC+04:30 | Mehdi Shiri 64' | | | Stadium: Shahid Dastgheib Stadium; Referee: Ashormahani |

| 24 October 2012 7 | PAS Hamedan | 2–1 | Melli Hafari Ahvaz | Hamedan |
| 15:00 UTC+04:30 | Abolghasem Pourasadollah 33'; Mohammad Alavi 82' (pen.); Abbas Kazemian (yellow card) | Summary | Milad Safi Khani 78'; Rasool Ramezani (yellow card); Ebrahim Sheikhi Nasab (red card) 86' | Stadium: Qods Hamedan; Referee: Touraj Haghverdi |

| 1 November 2012 8 | Esteghlal Khuzestan | 2–0 | PAS Hamedan | Ahvaz |
| 15:00 UTC+04:30 | Mohammad Moavi 31'; Mohammad Moavi 44' | | | Stadium: Takhti (Ahvaz); Referee: Salehi |

| 9 November 2012 9 | PAS Hamedan | 1–0 | Niroye Zamini | Hamedan |
| 14:45 UTC+04:30 | Mohammad Alavi 26'; Mohsen Pourhaji (yellow card); Javad Babaei (yellow card) | Summary | Farivar Torabi (yellow card) | Stadium: Qods Hamedan; Referee: Tarah |

| 15 November 2012 10 | Yadavaran Shalamcheh | 0–3 | PAS Hamedan | Ahvaz |
| 15:00 UTC+04:30 | | Summary | Mohsen Pourhaji 67'; Meghdad Ghobakhlou 78'; Meghdad Ghobakhlou 82' | Stadium: Kargaran Ahvaz Stadium; Referee: Mehrpisheh |

| 21 November 2012 11 | PAS Hamedan | 0–1 | Mes Rafsanjan | Hamedan |
| 14:15 UTC+04:30 | Lefteh Hamidi (yellow card) 85'; Meghdad Ghobakhlou (yellow card) 91' | Summary | Saeed Taleghani 56'; Ali Samereh (yellow card) 92' | Stadium: Qods Hamedan; Attendance: 2,000; Referee: Babak Vasilehbar |

| 29 November 2012 12 | Rahian Kermanshah | 1–0 | PAS Hamedan | Kermanshah |
| 14:15 UTC+04:30 | Ali Hemati (yellow card) 30'; Mohammad Khamis (yellow card) 35'; Farshad Salar Vand 38'; Yousef Behzadi (yellow card) 48' | Summary | | Stadium: Azadi Stadium (Kermanshah); Referee: Mohammadreza Akbarian |

| 9 December 2012 13 | PAS Hamedan | 1–0 | Shahrdari Yasuj | Hamedan |
| 14:00 UTC+04:30 | Ali Matouri (yellow card) 26'; Mohammad Pourmand (yellow card) 51'; Lefteh Hamidi 94' | Summary | Atabak Namazi (yellow card) 95' | Stadium: Qods Hamedan; Attendance: 3,000; Referee: Salehi |

| 28 December 2012 14 | Shahrdari Tabriz | 1–0 | PAS Hamedan | Tabriz |
| 14:00 UTC+04:30 | Mehrdad Ghanbari 49' | Summary | | Stadium: Takhti Stadium (Tabriz); Referee: Asadi |

| 6 January 2013 15 | PAS Hamedan | 2–2 | Shahrdari Bandar Abbas | Hamedan |
| 14:00 UTC+04:30 | Meghdad Ghobakhlou 40'; Lefteh Hamidi 59'; Lefteh Hamidi (red card) 82' | Summary | Pejman Shahpari 21'; Hamid Farzaneh (yellow card) 38'; Shahin Majidi (yellow card) 38'; Mehdi Aghamohammadi (yellow card) 53'; Amir Khodamoradi 82' | Stadium: Qods Hamedan; Referee: Seyed Mehdi Seyed Ali |

| 16 January 2013 16 | Saipa Shomal | 0–1 | PAS Hamedan | Sari, Iran |
| 14:00 UTC+04:30 | | Summary | Abolghasem Pourasadollah 55' | Stadium: Shohada Babol; Referee: Fatahi |

| 25 January 2013 17 | PAS Hamedan | 0–2 | Iranjavan | Hamedan |
| 14:00 UTC+04:30 | Vahid Aliabadi (yellow card) | Summary | Mostafa Najmizadeh 6'; Khosrow Piroozan 76'; Asghar Karamollahi (yellow card); Khosrow Piroozan (yellow card) | Stadium: Qods Hamedan; Attendance: 3,000; Referee: Babak Vasilehbar |

| 31 January 2013 18 | Foolad Yazd | 1–1 | PAS Hamedan | Yazd |
| 14:00 UTC+04:30 | Hekmat Pooladpour 82'; Darvish Mehran (yellow card); Ahmad Noorollahi (yellow card) | Summary | Meghdad Ghobakhlou 11' | Stadium: Shahid Nassiri Stadium; Referee: Kamani |

| 7 February 2013 19 | PAS Hamedan | 1–0 | Bargh Shiraz | Hamedan |
| 14:15 UTC+04:30 | Mohsen Pourhaji 55'; Abolghasem Pourasadollah (yellow card) | Summary | | Stadium: Qods Hamedan; Referee: Seyed Mehdi Seyed Ali |

| 16 February 2013 20 | Melli Hafari Ahvaz | 0–2 | PAS Hamedan | Ahvaz |
| 14:45 UTC+04:30 | | Summary | Oveis Kordjahan 25'; Mehrdad Rezaei 67' | Stadium: Naft Complex; Referee: Alireza Faghani |

| 25 February 2013 21 | PAS Hamedan | 0–1 | Esteghlal Khuzestan | Hamedan |
| 15:00 UTC+04:30 | Vahid Aliabadi (yellow card) | Summary | Mohammad Moavi 19' (pen.); Saeed Anafcheh (yellow card); Mohammad Nabgan (yellow card); Hadi Khanifar (yellow card) | Stadium: Qods Hamedan; Referee: Akbarian |

| 4 March 2013 22 | Niroye Zamini | 1–0 | PAS Hamedan | Tehran |
| 14:45 UTC+04:30 | Alireza Afzali 4' | Summary | | Stadium: Sardaran Shahid Shemiran; Referee: Zargar |

| 11 March 2013 23 | PAS Hamedan | 1–0 | Yadavaran Shalamcheh | Hamedan |
| 15:15 UTC+04:30 | Ali Matouri (yellow card) 23'; Ali Matouri 80'; Mojtaba Shiri (yellow card) | Summary | Mohammad Mehdi Varankesh (yellow card); Hossein Hamidi (yellow card); Iman Habibpour (yellow card); Ehsan Shirmardi (yellow card); Abolghasem (yellow card) | Stadium: Qods Hamedan; Attendance: 1,000; Referee: Fatahi |

| 30 March 2012 24 | Mes Rafsanjan | 0–0 | PAS Hamedan | Rafsanjan |
| 16:15 UTC+04:30 | | | | Stadium: Shohadaye Noushabad Stadium; Referee: Mohammadi |

| 8 April 2013 25 | PAS Hamedan | 2–1 | Rahian Kermanshah | Hamedan |
| 16:15 UTC+04:30 | Vahid Aliabadi 40' (pen.); Oveis Kordjahan 56' | Summary | Farshad Salarvand (yellow card); Yoosef Behzadi (red card) 35'; Farshad Salarvand 75'; Mahmood Khamisi (red card) 92' | Stadium: Qods Hamedan; Attendance: 2,000; Referee: Bakhshizadeh |

| 16 April 2013 26 | Shahrdari Yasuj | 0–1 | PAS Hamedan | Yasuj |
| 16:00 UTC+04:30 | Samad Akbari (yellow card) 30'; Atabak Namazi (yellow card) 54'; Mostafa Cheraghi (yellow card) 64'; Atabak Namazi (red card) 92' | Summary | Vahid Aliabadi 32' (pen.); Mehrdad Rezaei (yellow card) 50'; Mohsen Pourhaji (yellow card) 82'; Vahid Aliabadi (yellow card) 92' | Stadium: Takhti Yasouj; Attendance: 1,000; Referee: Peyman Farokhimehr |

=== Play-off ===
==== Round 1 ====
| 26 May 2013 1st Leg | PAS Hamedan | 2–1 | Mes Sarcheshmeh | Hamedan |
| 17:00 UTC+04:30 | Morteza Tabrizi 35'; Morteza Tabrizi 56'; Jalil Ahmadi (yellow card); Ahmad Jafari (yellow card); Karim Shaverdi (yellow card); Morteza Tabrizi (yellow card) | Summary | Hassan Najafi 29'; Nader Fathollahi (yellow card); Mohammad Assar Hassani (yellow card) | Stadium: Qods Hamedan; Referee: Saeid Mozaffarizadeh |

| 30 May 2013 2nd Leg | Mes Sarcheshmeh | 1–1 (3–2 agg.) | PAS Hamedan | Sarcheshmeh |
| 16:30 UTC+04:30 | Ali Ghorbani 73' | Summary | Lefteh Hamidi 93' | Stadium: Zeinali Stadium; Referee: Yadollah Jahanbazi |

==== Round 2 ====
| 21 June 2013 1st Leg | Zob Ahan Isfahan | 4–2 | PAS Hamedan | Isfahan |
| 17:30 UTC+04:30 | Sepehr Heidari 2'; Esmaeil Farhadi 6'; Farshad Bahadorani (yellow card) 15'; Mohsen Bayatinia 45'; Mohsen Mosalman (yellow card) 45'; Esmaeil Farhadi 58'; Mohsen Bayatinia (yellow card) 76' | | Mohsen Rabikhah (yellow card) 41'; Mohsen Rabikhah 71'; Amir Godari (yellow card) 76'; Vahid Aliabadi 92' (pen.) | Stadium: Fooladshahr Stadium; Referee: Mohsen Torky |

| 26 June 2013 2nd Leg | PAS Hamedan | 1–1 (5–3 agg.) | Zob Ahan Isfahan | Hamedan |
| 17:00 UTC+04:30 | Vahid Aliabadi 4' (pen.); Masoud Gholamalizad (red card) 25'; Morteza Tabrizi (yellow card) 33'; Lefteh Hamidi (yellow card) 83' | | Mohsen Bayatinia (red card) 29'; Mehdi Rajabzadeh 30' (pen.); Gevorg Kasparov (yellow card) 54'; Mohammad Salsali (yellow card) 83' | Stadium: Qods Hamedan; Referee: Saeid Mozaffarizadeh |

== Statistics ==
=== Top scorers ===
Includes all competitive matches. The list is sorted by shirt number when total goals are equal.

Last updated on 26 June 2013

| Ran | No. | Pos | Nat | Name | Azadegan League |
|---|---|---|---|---|---|
| 1 | 9 | FW | (Iran) | Meghdad Ghobakhlou | 9 |
| 2 | 3 | DF | (Iran) | Abolghasem Pourasadollah | 4 |
| 2 | 8 | MF | (Iran) | Vahid Aliabadi | 4 |
| 3 | 40 | FW | (Iran) | Lefteh Hamidi | 3 |
| 4 | 15 | MF | (Iran) | Mohammad Alavi | 2 |
| 4 | 23 | DF | (Iran) | Mohsen Pourhaji | 2 |
| 4 | 10 | MF | (Iran) | Morteza Tabrizi | 2 |
| 4 | 13 | MF | (Iran) | Mohsen Rabikhah | 2 |
| 4 | 7 | DF | (Iran) | Oveis Kordjahan | 2 |
| 5 | 17 | DF | (Iran) | Mehrdad Rezaei | 1 |
| 5 | 38 | FW | (Iran) | Ali Matouri | 1 |

=== Squad statistics ===
| No. | Pos. | Name | Total | | Discipline | |
| No. | Pos. | Name | Apps | Goals | Yellow card | Red card |
|---|---|---|---|---|---|---|
| 1 | GK | (Iran) Jalil Ahmadi | 26 | 0 | 1 | 0 |
| 2 | DF | (Iran) Mostafa Yousef Alizadeh | 1 | 0 | 0 | 0 |
| 3 | MF | (Iran) Abolghasem Pourasadollah | 24 | 3 | 0 | 0 |
| 4 | DF | (Iran) Mojtaba Shiri | 29 | 0 | 4 | 0 |
| 5 | FW | (Iran) Mohammad Mirzaei | 7 | 0 | 0 | 0 |
| 6 | MF | (Iran) Babak Razi | 17 | 0 | 2 | 1 |
| 7 | MF | (Iran) Oveis Kordjahan | 26 | 2 | 3 | 0 |
| 8 | MF | (Iran) Vahid Aliabadi | 26 | 4 | 5 | 0 |
| 9 | FW | (Iran) Meghdad Ghobakhlou | 28 | 9 | 5 | 0 |
| 10 | MF | (Iran) Morteza Tabrizi | 24 | 2 | 4 | 1 |
| 11 | DF | (Iran) Abbas Kazemian | 25 | 0 | 4 | 0 |
| 12 | MF | (Iran) Ahmad Taghavi | 12 | 0 | 1 | 0 |
| 13 | DF | (Iran) Mohsen Rabikhah | 19 | 2 | 3 | 1 |
| 14 | DF | (Iran) Ahmad Jafari | 4 | 0 | 1 | 0 |
| 15 | DF | (Iran) Mohammad Alavi | 17 | 2 | 0 | 0 |
| 16 | MF | (Iran) Javad Babaei | 0 | 0 | 0 | 0 |
| 17 | MF | (Iran) Mehrdad Rezaei | 21 | 1 | 4 | 0 |
| 20 | DF | (Iran) Hamid Reza Fathi | 21 | 0 | 1 | 0 |
| 21 | MF | (Iran) Amir Godari | 21 | 0 | 4 | 0 |
| 22 | GK | (Iran) Masoud Gholamalizad | 5 | 0 | 0 | 1 |
| 23 | DF | (Iran) Mohsen Pourhaji | 29 | 2 | 3 | 0 |
| 38 | FW | (Iran) Ali Matouri | 17 | 1 | 5 | 0 |
| 40 | FW | (Iran) Lefteh Hamidi | 21 | 3 | 5 | 1 |
| 44 | DF | (Iran) Karim Shaverdi | 16 | 0 | 1 | 0 |

Statistics accurate as of 26 June 2013

== See also ==
- 2012–13 Azadegan League
- 2012–13 Hazfi Cup
