= 2014–15 PAS Hamedan F.C. season =

PAS Hamedan
2014–15 season
- Chairman: (Iran) Bahram Yadi
- Manager: (Iran) Davoud Mahabadi
- Stadium: Qods Stadium (Hamedan)
- Azadegan League: N/A
Home colours	Away colours

The 2014–15 season is PAS Hamedan's 4th season in the Azadegan League.

== Competitions ==
=== Results summary ===
Overall								Home						Away					
Pld	W	D	L	GF	GA	GD	Pts	W	D	L	GF	GA	GD	W	D	L	GF	GA	GD
18	8	7	3	19	13	+6	31	5	4	0	10	6	+4	3	3	3	9	7	+2

Last updated: 13 September 2012.
Source: http://www.persianleague.com/statistics.html

=== Results by round ===
Round	1	2	3	4	5	6	7	8	9	10	11	12	13	14	15	16	17	18	19	20	21	22
Ground	H	A	H	A	H	H	A	H	A	H	A	A	H	A	H	A	A	H	A	-	A	H
Result	W	W	W	L	D	D	L	D	W	W	D	D	W	W	L	W	L	W	D	-	W	D
Position	4	3	2	3	3	3	5	5	4	4	4	4	3	4	4	3	4	2	5	5	3	3

Source: "Ipl". Archived from the original on 2012-09-15.
A = Away; H = Home; W = Win; D = Draw; L = Loss

=== Matches ===
Win Draw Loss Bye

Date Round	Home	Score	Away	Location

4 October 2014 1	PAS Hamedan	1 – 0	Gol Gohar Sirjan	Hamedan
15:30 UTC+04:30	Mohsen Azarpad 70'	Summary		Stadium: Qods Hamedan; Referee: Mehdi Shojaei

10 October 2014 2	Damash Gilan	0 – 1	PAS Hamedan	Rasht
15:15 UTC+04:30		Summary	Mohsen Azarpad 63'	Stadium: Shahid Dr. Azodi Stadium; Referee: Saeed Rahimi Moghadam

21 October 2014 3	PAS Hamedan	1 – 0	Shahrdari Bandar Abbas	Hamedan
15:00 UTC+04:30	Akbar Bakhtiari 89'	Summary		Stadium: Qods Hamedan; Referee: Ali Ahmadi

29 October 2014 4	Siah Jamegan Khorasan	1 – 0	PAS Hamedan	Mashhad
14:15 UTC+04:30	Farhad Kheirkhah 92' (pen.)	Summary		Stadium: Samen Stadium; Referee: Seifollahpoor

8 November 2014 5	PAS Hamedan	1 – 1	Shahrdari Tabriz	Hamedan
14:45 UTC+04:30	Ali Yoonesi 2'	Summary	Jalil Ahmadi 9' (o.g.)	Stadium: Qods Hamedan; Referee: Salehi

19 November 2014 6	PAS Hamedan	0 – 0	Sanat Naft Abadan	Hamedan
14:30 UTC+04:30		Summary		Stadium: Qods Hamedan; Referee: Hajmalek

25 November 2014 7	Mes Rafsanjan	1 – 0	PAS Hamedan	Rafsanjan
14:00 UTC+04:30	Abbas Kazemian 80'	[		Stadium: Takhti Stadium (Rafsanjan); Referee: Vasilehbar

2 December 2014 8	PAS Hamedan	1 – 1	Rahian Kermanshah	Hamedan
14:15 UTC+04:30	Akbar Bakhtiariazad 38'	Summary	Amin Poorali 90'	Stadium: Qods Hamedan; Referee: Adel

9 December 2014 9	Etka Gorgan	1 – 2	PAS Hamedan	Gorgan
14:00 UTC+04:30	Ehsan Taedi 80'	Summary	Mojtaba Mahboub-Mojaz 24'; Mohsen Azarpad 43'	Stadium: Shohada Gorgan

18 December 2014 10	PAS Hamedan	2 – 1	Parseh Tehran	Hamedan
14:00 UTC+04:30	Saeed Kheradmand 46'; Mohsen Azarpad 72'	Summary	Amir Hossein Moosavi 65'	Stadium: Qods Hamedan

24 December 2014 11	Foolad Yazd	1 – 1	PAS Hamedan	Yazd
14:00 UTC+04:30	Seyed Abdollah Hosseini 23'		Saeed Kheradmand 4'	Stadium: Shahid Nassiri Stadium

1 February 2015 12	Gol Gohar Sirjan	1 – 1	PAS Hamedan	Sirjan
14:00 UTC+04:30	Saeed Kazemi 12'		Eshagh Sobhani 45'	Stadium: Imam Ali Stadium; Referee: HeydarPanah

7 February 2015 13	PAS Hamedan	2 – 0	Damash Gilan	Hamedan
14:00 UTC+04:30	Mojtaba Mahboub-Mojaz 7' (pen.); Eshagh Sobhani 33'			Stadium: Qods Hamedan; Referee: Rezaeitabar

15 February 2015 14	Shahrdari Bandar Abbas	0 – 1	PAS Hamedan	Bandar Abbas
14:30 UTC+04:30			Mojtaba Zarei 45'	Stadium: Takhti Stadium (Bandar Abbas); Referee: Rahimimoghadam

22 February 2015 15	PAS Hamedan	0 – 2	Siah Jamegan Khorasan	Hamedan
14:30 UTC+04:30			Behrooz Afshar 43'; Hossein Zamehran 94'	Stadium: Qods Hamedan; Referee: Hajbabaei

1 March 2015 16	Shahrdari Tabriz	0 – 1	PAS Hamedan	Tabriz
14:45 UTC+04:30			Mahmood Mahmmodi 80'	Stadium: Shahrdari Complex; Referee: Khorshidi

7 March 2015 17	Sanat Naft Abadan	1 – 0	PAS Hamedan	Abadan
15:30 UTC+04:30	Rahim Mehdi Zohaivi 35'			Stadium: Takhti Stadium (Abadan); Referee: Vahedi

14 March 2015 18	PAS Hamedan	1 – 0	Mes Rafsanjan	Hamedan
15:00 UTC+04:30	Eshagh Sobhani 55'			Stadium: Qods Hamedan; Referee: Jahanbazi

6 April 2015 19	Rahian Kermanshah	1 – 1	PAS Hamedan	Kermanshah
16:30 UTC+04:30	Armin Talaeimanesh 19'		Amin Hejazi 50' (o.g.)	Stadium: Kargaran Kermanshah; Referee: Haghverdi

20	v

21 April 2015 21	Parseh Tehran	0 – 1	PAS Hamedan	Tehran
16:45 UTC+04:30			Mehdi Mohammadi 43'	Stadium: Sanaye Defa; Referee: Alireza Faghani

28 April 2015 22	PAS Hamedan	1 – 1	Foolad Yazd	Hamedan
16:45 UTC+04:30	Mohammad Sadegh Karami 41'		Vahid Nemati 84'	Stadium: Qods Hamedan; Referee: Mohammadi

=== Hazfi Cup ===
Win Draw Loss Postponed

Date Round	Home	Score	Away	Location

17 September 2014 Round of 128	Zob Ahan Novin Isfahan	2 – 2 (2–4 p)	PAS Hamedan	Isfahan
		Summary

28 September 2014 Round of 64	PAS Hamedan	4 – 0	Besat Kermanshah	Hamedan
		Summary		Stadium: Qods Hamedan

16 October 2014 Round of 32	Rah Ahan Tehran	2 – 1	PAS Hamedan	Tehran
				Stadium: Takhti Stadium (Tehran)

== See also ==
- 2013–14 Azadegan League
- 2013–14 Hazfi Cup
