= Babak Razi =

Iranian footballer

Personal information
- Full name: Babak Razi
- Date of birth: 2 June 1981 (age 45)
- Place of birth: Iran
- Position: Midfielder

Team information
- Current team: Pas Hamedan

Senior career*
Years	Team	Apps	(Gls)
2005–2007	Shamoushak		
2007–2008	Shirin Faraz	17	(3)
2008–2010	Zob Ahan	28	(0)
2010–2011	Nassaji Mazandaran		
2011–	Pas Hamedan	0	(0)
- * Club domestic league appearances and goals as of 1 June 2010 (UTC) ‡ National team caps and goals as of 26 March 2010

Babak Razi (born June 2, 1981) is an Iranian footballer who plays for Pas Hamedan in the Azadegan League.

== Club career ==
In 2008, Razi Joined Zob Ahan F.C. after spending the previous season at Shirin Faraz F.C.

=== Club career statistics ===
Last Update 1 June 2010

Club performance			League		Cup		Continental		Total	
Season	Club	League	Apps	Goals	Apps	Goals	Apps	Goals	Apps	Goals
Iran			League		Hazfi Cup		Asia		Total	
2005–06	Shamoushak	Persian Gulf Cup	17	0			-	-		
2006–07	Shamoushak	Azadegan League					-	-		
2007–08	Shirin Faraz	Persian Gulf Cup	17	3			-	-		
2008–09	Zob Ahan	Persian Gulf Cup	16	0			-	-		
2009–10	Zob Ahan	Persian Gulf Cup	12	0			0	0		
2010–11	Nassaji	Azadegan League					-	-		
2011–12	Pas Hamedan	Azadegan League	0	0	0	0	-	-	0	0
Total	Iran						0	0		
Total	Career total						0	0		

- Assist Goals

Season	Team	Assists
09–10	Zob Ahan	0
