= Omid Khouraj =

Iranian footballer

Personal information
- Full name: Omid Khouraj
- Date of birth: September 20, 1981 (age 45)
- Place of birth: Tehran
- Position: Defender

Team information
- Current team: Foolad
- Number: 20

Senior career*
Years	Team	Apps	(Gls)
2002–2007	Pas Tehran F.C.	?	(3)
2007–2010	Pas Hamedan F.C.	68	(5)
2010–2012	Foolad	9	(1)
- * Club domestic league appearances and goals as of 27 September 2010

Omid Khouraj (Persian: اميد خورج, born September 20, 1982) is an Iranian footballer who plays for Pas Hamedan F.C. in the IPL.

== Club career statistics ==
- Last Update: 3 August 2011

Club performance			League		Cup		Continental		Total	
Season	Club	League	Apps	Goals	Apps	Goals	Apps	Goals	Apps	Goals
Iran			League		Hazfi Cup		Asia		Total	
2002-03	Pas Tehran	Pro League		0			-	-		
2003-04	Pas Tehran	Pro League		0			-	-		
2004-05	Pas Tehran	Pro League	7	0				0		
2005-06	Pas Tehran	Pro League	13	1			-	-		
2006-07	Pas Tehran	Pro League	16	2			-	-		
2007-08	Pas Hamedan	Pro League	23	1	3	0	-	-	26	1
2008-09	Pas Hamedan	Pro League	23	1	2	0	-	-	25	1
2009-10	Pas Hamedan	Pro League	23	2		0	-	-		0
2010–11	Foolad	Pro League	31	1	3	0	-	-	34	1
2011-12	Foolad	Pro League	1	0	0	0	-	-	0	0
Career total				9				0		

- Assist Goals

Season	Team	Assists
05/06	Pas Tehran	1
09/10	Pas Hamedan	1
10/11	Foolad	2
11/12	Foolad	0

== Honours ==
- Iran's Premier Football League Winner: 1
  - 2003/04 with Pas Tehran
