= Meghdad Ghobakhlou =

Iranian football player (born 1982)

Personal information
- Full name: Meghdad Ghobakhlou
- Date of birth: August 23, 1982 (age 44)
- Place of birth: Garmsar, Iran
- Height: 1.86 m (6 ft 1 in)
- Position: Striker

Youth career
- 1997–1998: Esteghlal Garmsar
- 1998–1999: Pirouzi Garmsar
- 1999–2002: Saipa
- 2001–2002: Fajr Sepah Tehran
- 2002–2004: Persepolis

Senior career*
Years	Team	Apps	(Gls)
2003–2006	Persepolis	11	(1)
2006–2007	Malavan	13	(1)
2007–2008	Kaveh Zanjan	19	(1)
2008–2011	Pas Hamedan	42	(4)
2011–2012	Shahrdari Yasuj	12	(7)
2012	Mes Kerman	8	(2)
2012–2013	Pas Hamedan	26	(9)
2013–2014	Saipa	15	(0)
2014–2015	Naft Abadan	11	(1)
2015–2016	Gostaresh Foulad	16	(1)
2016–2017	Nassaji	6	(0)
- * Club domestic league appearances and goals

Meghdad Ghobakhlou (Persian: مقداد قباخلو, pronounced [mɛɢdɑd ɛ ɢobɑxlu]; born 23 August 1982) is an Iranian football player.

== Club career ==
=== Persepolis ===
He was promoted to Persepolis first team in the beginning of the 2003–04 season, and scored a tie-breaking 90+2 minute goal for Persepolis in a friendly against SK Sturm Graz.

=== Pas Hamedan ===
Ghobakhlou dealt with a Posterior cruciate ligament injury in 2008 missing half of 2008–09 season. He was named Fair Player of the week 19 during 2008–09 season.

=== Saipa ===
He joined Saipa in summer 2013.

=== Club career statistics ===
As of 16 July 2015

Club performance			League		Cup		Total	
Season	Club	League	Apps	Goals	Apps	Goals	Apps	Goals
Iran			League		Hazfi Cup		Total	
2003–04	Persepolis	Pro League	0	0	1	1	1	1
2004–05	Persepolis	Pro League	5	1		0		1
2005–06	Persepolis	Pro League	6	0		0		0
2006–07	Malavan	Pro League	13	1		1		2
2007–08	Kaveh	Division 1	19	1	3	1	22	2
2008–09	PAS Hamedan	Pro League	9	1				
2009–10	PAS Hamedan	Pro League	18	2	1	0	19	2
2010–11	PAS Hamedan	Pro League	15	1				
2011–12	Shahrdari Yasuj	Division 1	12	7				
2011–12	Mes Kerman	Pro League	8	2	0	0	8	2
2012–13	PAS Hamedan	Division 1	26	9	–	–	26	9
2013–14	Saipa	Pro League	15	0	0	0	15	0
2014–15	Naft Abadan	Division 1	11	1	–	–	11	1
Career total			157	26				
