= Masoud Gholamalizad =

Iranian footballer

Personal information
- Full name: Masoud Gholamalizad
- Date of birth: 6 September 1979 (age 47)
- Place of birth: Iran
- Position: Goalkeeper

Senior career*
Years	Team	Apps	(Gls)
2004–2009	Malavan	119	(0)
2009–2010	Paykan	28	(0)
2010–2012	Saba	7	(0)
2012–	PAS	0	(0)
- * Club domestic league appearances and goals as of 19 August 2011, 2010 (UTC) ‡ National team caps and goals as of 27 April 2010

Masoud Gholamalizad (born September 6, 1979) is an Iranian footballer who plays for PAS Hamedan in the Azadegan League.

== Club career ==
Gholamalizad joined Paykan F.C. in 2009

=== Club career statistics ===
As of 19 August 2011

Club performance			League		Cup		Continental		Total	
Season	Club	League	Apps	Goals	Apps	Goals	Apps	Goals	Apps	Goals
Iran			League		Hazfi Cup		Asia		Total	
2004–05	Malavan	Pro League	26	0		0	-	-		0
2005–06	Malavan	Pro League	19	0		0	-	-		0
2006–07	Malavan	Pro League	22	0		0	-	-		0
2007–08	Malavan	Pro League	24	0	0	0	-	-	24	0
2008–09	Malavan	Pro League	28	0	2	0	-	-	30	0
2009–10	Paykan	Pro League	28	0	1	0	-	-	29	0
2010–11	Saba	Pro League	7	0	0	0	-	-	7	0
2011–12	Saba	Pro League	0	0	0	0	-	-	0	0
Career total			154	0		0	0	0		0
