= Mohammad Alavi (footballer) =

Iranian footballer and manager

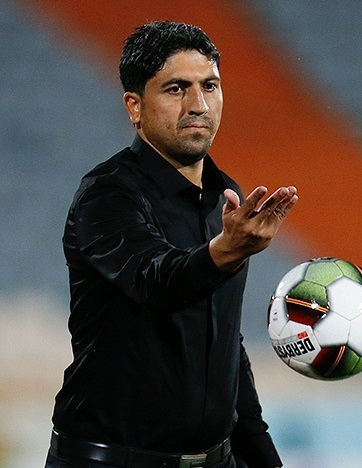
- Alavi in 2019

Personal information
- Full name: Seyyed Mohammad Alavi
- Date of birth: 29 January 1982 (age 44)
- Place of birth: Kashan, Iran
- Height: 1.78 m (5 ft 10 in)
- Position: Defensive midfielder

Youth career
- Foolad

Senior career*
Years	Team	Apps	(Gls)
2002–2007	Foolad	112	(7)
2007–2008	Pas Hamedan	31	(4)
2008–2009	Persepolis	2	(0)
2009	→ Pas Hamedan (loan)	18	(1)
2009–2010	Foolad	11	(1)
2010–2011	Gostaresh Foolad	19	(2)
2011–2012	Machine Sazi	14	(4)
2012	Pas Hamedan	0	(0)
Total		207	(19)

International career
2003	Iran U-23		
2004–2006	Iran	22	(2)

Managerial career
- 2017–2019: Karoon Arvand
- 2019: Esteghlal Khuzestan
- * Club domestic league appearances and goals

Seyed Mohammad Alavi (Persian: سید محمد علوی, born 29 January 1982) is an Iranian football manager and a former player. He usually played in the defensive midfield position.

== Club career ==
A product of the football rich province of Khuzestan and the young team of Foolad, he was a pivotal player within this young team and his consistency and solid defending was one of the factors for the success of his club in becoming the champions of the IPL 2004/05. He played for the club in Iran's Premier League till its relegation to the lower division, Azadegan League, in 2007. He also played for Foolad in the 2006 AFC Champions League group stage.

He moved to Pas and stayed there for a season. He moved to Persepolis and stayed for few months where he only played 2 games and had no spot in the team because of excellent performances by Karim Bagheri and Maziar Zare and moved for back to Pas for 6 months loan. He moved back to Foolad in summer 2009.

=== Club Career Statistics ===
Last Update 4 May 2011

Club performance			League		Cup		Continental		Total	
Season	Club	League	Apps	Goals	Apps	Goals	Apps	Goals	Apps	Goals
Iran			League		Hazfi Cup		Asia		Total	
2002–03	Foolad	Pro League	23	5			-	-		
2003–04	Foolad	Pro League	24	0			-	-		
2004–05	Foolad	Pro League	26	2			-	-		
2005–06	Foolad	Pro League	23	0				0		
2006–07	Foolad	Pro League	16	0			-	-		
2007–08	PAS	Pro League	31	4	3	0	-	-	34	4
2008–09	Persepolis	Pro League	2	0	0	0	0	0	2	0
2008–09	PAS	Pro League	18	1	4	1	-	-	24	1
2009–10	Foolad	Pro League	11	1			-	-		
2010–11	Gostaresh	Division 1	19	2			-	-		
2011–12	Mashin Sazi	Division 1	14	4	0	0	-	-	3	4
Total	Iran		204	19				0		
Career total			204	19				0		

- Assist Goals

Season	Team	Assists
07–08	PAS	2
09–10	Foolad	0

== International career ==
=== Under-23 national team ===
Alavi stormed on the national scene after his header goal against China in Azadi Stadium which assured Iran Under-23 team 3 points in the anticipated revival of the team's chances in the 2004 Olympic qualifying matches. Although Alavi was selected by then coach Mohammad Mayeli Kohan in the roster of the U23 team, he was not given much playing time. After Hossein Faraki was appointed as the new coach, Alavi was given more playing time in all the remaining matches. Apart from his goal against China, Alavi played well in all the remaining matches under Faraki although it was a step too late as Iran did not manage to dislodge the Koreans from clinching the qualification to Athens.

=== Senior national team ===
In the 2004 Asian Cup, Alavi scored a goal in Iran's controversial loss to China in the semifinals of the tournament held in China 2004. The goal kept Iran's hopes alive, as they were forced to play one man down due to a red card, but China progressed to the final match at the end by penalty shoot-outs.

Alavi was usually a substitute player within the national team and was not part of the World Cup squad.

== Honours ==
- Persian Gulf Cup
- 2003–04 with Foolad
