= Oveis Kordjahan =

Iranian footballer (born 1985)

Personal information
- Date of birth: 13 April 1985 (age 41)
- Place of birth: Iran
- Height: 1.80 m (5 ft 11 in)
- Position: Defender

Senior career*
Years	Team	Apps	(Gls)
2005–2007	Shahid Ghandi Yazd	12	(0)
2007–2010	Pas Hamedan	38	(0)
2010–2011	Aluminium Hormozgan		
2011–2012	Mes Sarcheshmeh	21	(0)
2012–2013	PAS Hamedan	27	(1)
2013	Zob Ahan	7	(0)
2014–2015	Shahrdari Tabriz	6	(0)
2015–2016	Iranjavan	37	(10)
2016–2017	Rah Ahan	12	(0)
2017	Aluminium Arak	13	(0)
2017–2018	Iranjavan	27	(11)
2018–2019	Baadraan	10	(0)
2019	Khooneh Be Khooneh	2	(0)
2019–2020	Shahrdari Mahshahr	6	(0)
2020–2022	Sepidrood	38	(1)
2022–2023	PAS Hamedan	18	(0)
2023	Nika Pars Chaloos		
2023–2024	PAS Hamedan	19	(2)
- * Club domestic league appearances and goals

Oveis Kordjahan (Persian: اویس کردجهان; born 13 April 1985) is an Iranian former footballer.

== Club career ==
In 2007, Kordjahan joined Pas Hamedan.

=== Club career statistics ===
As of 10 May 2013

Club performance			League		Cup		Continental		Total	
Season	Club	League	Apps	Goals	Apps	Goals	Apps	Goals	Apps	Goals
Iran			League		Hazfi Cup		Asia		Total	
2005–06	Shahid Ghandi	Pro League	12	0			-	-		
2006–07	Shahid Ghandi	Division 1					-	-		
2007–08	Pas Hamedan	Pro League	10	0			-	-		
2008–09	Pas Hamedan	Pro League	21	0			-	-		
2009–10	Pas Hamedan	Pro League	9	0		0	-	-		0
2010–11	Aluminium	Division 1					-	-		
2011–12	Mes Sarcheshmeh	Pro League	0	0	0	0	-	-	0	0
2012–13	Pas Hamedan	Division 1	27	1	0	0	-	-	27	1
2013–14	Zob Ahan	Pro League	0	0	0	0	-	-	0	0
Career total							0	0		

- Assist Goals

Season	Team	Assists
09–10	Pas	1
