= Saber Mirghorbani =

Iranian football player (born 1983)

Personal information
- Full name: Seyed Saber Mirghorbani
- Date of birth: September 17, 1983 (age 43)
- Place of birth: Babolsar, Iran
- Position: Striker

Team information
- Current team: [Sardar Bukan]

Youth career
- Rah Ahan
- Pas

Senior career*
Years	Team	Apps	(Gls)
2003–2005	Fajr Sepasi		(0)
2005–2007	Mes Kerman	45	(10)
2007–2008	Sanat Naft	29	(9)
2008–2009	Saipa	23	(4)
2009–2010	PAS Hamedan	21	(0)
2010–2012	Paykan	25	(6)
2012–2013	Shahrdari Tabriz	0	(0)
2013–2015	Nassaji Mazandaran	22	(6)
2015–	Esteghlal Ahvaz	0	(0)

International career^{‡}
2007	Iran	1	(0)

Managerial career
- 2015: Esteghlal Ahvaz (Player-coach)
- * Club domestic league appearances and goals as of July 2015 ‡ National team caps and goals as of 24 June 2007

Seyed Saber Mirghorbani (Persian: صابر میرقربانی, born September 17, 1983, in Babolsar, Iran) is an Iranian football player.

== Club career ==
=== Club career statistics ===
As of 30 September 2010

Club performance			League		Cup		Continental		Total	
Season	Club	League	Apps	Goals	Apps	Goals	Apps	Goals	Apps	Goals
Iran			League		Hazfi Cup		Asia		Total	
2003–04	Fajr	Pro League		0			-	-		
2004–05	Fajr	Pro League		0			-	-		
2005–06	Mes	Azadegan League	20	4			-	-		
2006–07	Mes	Pro League	25	6			-	-		
2007–08	Sanat Naft	Pro League	29	9	1	1	-	-	30	10
2008–09	Saipa	Pro League	23	4	1	0	2	1	26	5
2009–10	Pas	Pro League	21	0		0	-	-		0
2010–11	Paykan	Pro League	5	1	0	0	-	-	5	1
2011–12	Paykan	Azadegan League	20	5	1	0	-	-	21	5
2012–13	Shahrdari Tabriz	Azadegan League	7	0	0	0	-	-	7	0
Total	Iran			24			2	1		
Career total				24			2	1		

- Assist Goals

Season	Team	Assists
06–07	Mes	3
07–08	Sanat Naft	2
09–10	Pas	2
10–11	Paykan	1

== International career ==
Saber Mirghorbani was called up to the Iran national football team in June 2007 for the West Asian Football Federation Championship 2007. He made his debut for Iran in a match vs Palestine.
