= Mohammad Hossein Naeiji =

Iranian footballer (born 1990)

Personal information
- Date of birth: 9 September 1990 (age 36)
- Place of birth: Tehran, Iran
- Height: 1.92 m (6 ft 4 in)
- Position: Goalkeeper

Team information
- Current team: Fajr Sepasi Shiraz
- Number: 22

Youth career
- 2008–2009: Esteghlal
- 2009–2010: Persepolis

Senior career*
Years	Team	Apps	(Gls)
2008-2009	Esteghlal F.C	0	(0)
2009–2010	Persepolis	0	(0)
2011–2012	Gostaresh Foolad	4	(0)
2012–2013	PAS Hamedan	5	(0)
2013–2014	Persepolis Shomal	12	(0)
2014–2017	Khoneh Be Khoneh	57	(0)
2017–2018	Saba Qom	17	(0)
2018–2019	Karoon Arvand Khorramshahr	18	(0)

International career
2006	Iran U16		
2008	Iran U18		
- * Club domestic league appearances and goals

Mohammad Hossein Naeiji (Persian: محمد حسین نائیجی), is an Iranian goalkeeper who currently plays for Fajr Sepasi Shiraz F.C. in the Azadegan League. He previously played for Persepolis and Esteghlal F.C. in the Iran Pro League.

== Club career ==
He moved to Persepolis in summer 2009 from Esteghlal.

== Honours ==
- Hazfi Cup
  - Winner: 1
    - 2009/10 with Persepolis
