= Mojtaba Mahboub Mojaz =

Iranian footballer (born 1991)

Personal information
- Date of birth: 24 April 1991 (age 35)
- Place of birth: Tehran, Iran
- Position: Striker

Team information
- Current team: Baadraan Tehran

Youth career
- 2004–2011: Esteghlal

Senior career*
Years	Team	Apps	(Gls)
2009–2012	Esteghlal	7	(0)
2011–2012	→ Mes Sarcheshmeh (loan)	3	(1)
2012–2013	Parseh Tehran	17	(5)
2013–2015	PAS Hamedan	17	(7)
2015–2018	Mes Rafsanjan		
2018–	Baadraan Tehran		

International career^{‡}
2009–2010	Iran U20		
- * Club domestic league appearances and goals as of 20 January 2014 ‡ National team caps and goals as of 30 December 2009

Mojtaba Mahboub Mojaz (Persian: مجتبی محبوب مجاز; born 24 April 1991) is an Iranian footballer who plays as a striker for Azadegan League club Baadraan Tehran.

== Club career ==
He played his first match for Esteghlal during the 2009–10 season and later played on loan for Mes Sarcheshmeh. He joined PAS Hamedan in June 2013 and moved to Mes Rafsanjan in June 2015.

=== Club career statistics ===
As of 20 January 2014

Club performance			League		Cup		Continental		Total	
Season	Club	League	Apps	Goals	Apps	Goals	Apps	Goals	Apps	Goals
Iran			League		Hazfi Cup		Asia		Total	
2009–10	Esteghlal	Pro League	4	0		0	0	0	4	0
2010–11	Esteghlal	Pro League	3	0		0	0	0	3	0
2011–12	Esteghlal	Pro League	0	0	0	0	0	0	0	0
2011–12	Mes Sarcheshmeh (loan)	Pro League	3	0	0	0	–	–	3	0
2012–13	Parseh Tehran	Azadegan League	17	5	1	0	–	–	18	4
2013–14	PAS Hamedan	Azadegan League	17	7	0	0	–	–	17	7
Career total			44	11	1	0	0	0	45	11

- Assists

Season	Team	Assists
11-12	Mes Sarcheshmeh	1

== Honours ==
=== Club ===
- Iran's Premier Football League
  - Runner up: 1
    - 2010–11 with Esteghlal
  - Third Place: 1
    - 2009–10 With Esteghlal
