= Ali Matouri =

Iranian footballer (born 1982)

Personal information
- Date of birth: 27 August 1982 (age 44)
- Place of birth: Bandar Mahshahr, Iran
- Height: 1.76 m (5 ft 9 in)
- Position: Defender

Senior career*
Years	Team	Apps	(Gls)
2007–2009	Sanat Naft Abadan	20	(0)
2010–2011	Shahrdari Bandar Abbas		
2012	PAS Hamedan	1	(0)
2013	Aluminium Hormozgan	3	(0)
2013–2014	Shahrdari Bandar Abbas	7	(1)
2015–2016	Naft va Gaz Gachsaran	3	(0)
2017–2018	Sardar Bukan	13	(0)
- * Club domestic league appearances and goals

Ali Matouri (born 27 August 1982) is an Iranian former footballer who played as a defender for Sanat Naft Abadan in the Persian Gulf Pro League. He has also played for clubs like PAS Hamedan and Shahrdari Bandar Abbas.

== Controversies ==
Matouri is currently working as a football agent. He was banned by the Ethics Committee of the Football Federation of Iran for ethical violations, along with Mohammad Hossein Jafarseresht and Mohammad Esmail Kabali, and received a three-year ban from all activities related to football, futsal, and beach football.
