= Karim Shaverdi =

Iranian footballer

Personal information
- Full name: Karim Shaverdi
- Date of birth: 7 February 1983 (age 43)
- Place of birth: Ahvaz, Iran
- Position: Midfielder

Senior career*
Years	Team	Apps	(Gls)
2005–2012	Foolad		
2012–2013	Pas Hamedan		
2013–2014	Esteghlal Khuzestan	9	(0)
- * Club domestic league appearances and goals

Karim Shaverdi (born 7 February 1983) is an Iranian footballer.

== Club career ==
Shahverdi has played his entire career for Foolad F.C.

Club performance			League		Cup		Continental		Total	
Season	Club	League	Apps	Goals	Apps	Goals	Apps	Goals	Apps	Goals
Iran			League		Hazfi Cup		Asia		Total	
2005–06	Foolad	Pro League	13	0			-	-		
2006–07	Foolad	Pro League	25	0			-	-		
2007–08	Foolad	Division 1	?	0			-	-		
2008–09	Foolad	Pro League	2	0			-	-		
2009–10	Foolad	Pro League	14	0			-	-		
2010–11	Foolad	Pro League	26	0	3	0	-	-	29	0
2011–12	Foolad	Pro League	0	0	0	0	-	-	0	0
Career total				0			0	0		

- Assist Goals

Season	Team	Assists
10/11	Foolad	0
11/12	Foolad	0
