= Hamid Reza Fathi =

Iranian professional football player

Personal information
- Full name: Hamid Reza Fathi
- Date of birth: September 23, 1980 (age 46)
- Place of birth: Iran
- Position: Defender

Team information
- Current team: PAS Hamedan

Senior career*
Years	Team	Apps	(Gls)
2006–2007	Deyhim Ahvaz		
2007–2009	Mes Rafsanjan		(2)
2009–2012	Naft Tehran	35	(0)
2012	Gahar Zagros	2	(0)
2012–2013	PAS Hamedan	23	(0)
2013–2014	Paykan	3	(1)
2014	Iranjavan	11	(0)
- * Club domestic league appearances and goals as of 25 September 2010 ‡ National team caps and goals as of 25 September 2010

Hamid Reza Fathi is an Iranian professional football player currently playing for PAS Hamedan in the Azadegan League.

== Career ==
Fathi joined Naft Tehran F.C. in 2009. He played for Mes Rafsanjan F.C. in the previous two seasons.

Club performance			League		Cup		Continental		Total	
Season	Club	League	Apps	Goals	Apps	Goals	Apps	Goals	Apps	Goals
Iran			League		Hazfi Cup		Asia		Total	
2007–08	Mes Rafsanjan	Azadegan	?	0		0	0	0		0
2008–09	Mes Rafsanjan	Azadegan	?	2		0	0	0		0
2009–10	Naft Tehran	Azadegan	21	0		0	0	0		0
2010–11	Naft Tehran	IPL	14	0		0	-	-		0
Total	Iran		35	0		0	0	0		0
Career total			35	0		0	0	0		0

== External sources ==
- Profile at Persianleague
