= Ahmad Taghavi =

Iranian footballer

Personal information
- Full name: Ahmad Taghavi
- Date of birth: 27 January 1978 (age 48)
- Place of birth: Iran
- Position: Midfielder

Team information
- Current team: Aboomoslem

Senior career*
Years	Team	Apps	(Gls)
2005–2009	Rah Ahan	117	(11)
2009–2011	Saba Battery	40	(0)
2011–	Pas Hamedan	0	(0)
2012–2013	Aboomoslem		
- * Club domestic league appearances and goals as of 31 August 2010

Ahmad Taghavi (born January 27, 1978) is a former Iranian footballer, who latterly was signed to the Azadegan League side Pas Hamedan.

== Professional ==
Taghavi joined Saba Qom F.C. in 2009 after spending the previous season at Rah Ahan F.C.

=== Club career statistics ===
Last Update 19 October 2010

Club performance			League		Cup		Continental		Total	
Season	Club	League	Apps	Goals	Apps	Goals	Apps	Goals	Apps	Goals
Iran			League		Hazfi Cup		Asia		Total	
2005–06	Rah Ahan	Persian Gulf Cup	28	3			-	-		
2006–07	Rah Ahan	Persian Gulf Cup	30	1			-	-		
2007–08	Rah Ahan	Persian Gulf Cup	36	6			-	-		
2008–09	Rah Ahan	Persian Gulf Cup	28	1			-	-		
2009–10	Saba	Persian Gulf Cup	16	0			-	-		
2010–11	Saba	Persian Gulf Cup	24	0	1	0	-	-	25	0
2011–12	Pas Hamedan	Azadegan League	0	0	0	0	-	-	0	0
Total	Iran		157	12			0	0		
Career total			157	12			0	0		

- Assist goals

Season	Team	Assists
05–06	Rah Ahan	4
06–07	Rah Ahan	5
07–08	Rah Ahan	5
08–09	Rah Ahan	2
10–11	Saba	0
