= Lefteh Hamidi =

Iranian footballer

Lefté Hamidi
Personal information
- Date of birth: December 1, 1982 (age 43)
- Place of birth: Shushtar, Iran
- Position: Forward

Team information
- Current team: Shahrdari Arak

Youth career
- Foolad

Senior career*
Years	Team	Apps	(Gls)
2004–2006	Foolad	32	(8)
2006–2007	Pas	9	(0)
2007–2008	PAS Hamedan	8	(1)
2008	→ Foolad (loan)		(2)
2008	Al Rams		(10)
2009	Baniyas SC		
2009–2010	Foolad	7	(0)
2010–2011	Naft Masjed Soleyman	2	(0)
2011	Jam Bushehr		
2011–2012	Shahrdari Arak		
2013–2014	PAS Hamedan	7	(0)
- * Club domestic league appearances and goals

Lefté Hamidi (Persian: لفته حمیدی, born December 1, 1982) is an Iranian footballer. He is one of Arabs of Khuzestan.
