= Vahid Aliabadi =

Iranian footballer

Personal information
- Full name: Vahid Aliabadi
- Date of birth: 20 February 1990 (age 36)
- Place of birth: Hamedan, Iran
- Position: Midfielder

Team information
- Current team: Saba Qom
- Number: 88

Youth career
- 2004–2007: Pas Hamedan

Senior career*
| Years | Team | Apps | (Gls) |
| 2008–2013 | Pas Hamedan | 77 | (9) |
| 2011–2012 | → Mes Sarcheshmeh (loan) | 14 | (2) |
| 2013–2014 | Zob Ahan | 2 | (0) |
| 2014–2015 | Saba Qom | 18 | (0) |
| 2015–2016 | Khoneh Be Khoneh | 14 | (0) |
| 2016–2017 | Saba Qom | 11 | (0) |
| 2017-2020 | Baadraan Tehran F.C. | | |
| 2020 | Arman Gohar Sirjan F.C. | | |
- * Club domestic league appearances and goals as of 15 May 2013

Vahid Aliabadi (born February 20, 1990) is an Iranian footballer who currently plays for Saba Qom.

== Club career ==
Aliabadi has played his entire career for Pas Hamedan.

| Club performance | | | League | | Cup | | Continental | | Total | |
| Season | Club | League | Apps | Goals | Apps | Goals | Apps | Goals | Apps | Goals |
| Iran | | | League | | Hazfi Cup | | Asia | | Total | |
|---|---|---|---|---|---|---|---|---|---|---|
| 2008–09 | Pas Hamedan | Pro League | 17 | 0 | 2 | 0 | – | – | 19 | 0 |
| 2009–10 | Pas Hamedan | Pro League | 11 | 0 | | 0 | – | – | | 0 |
| 2010–11 | Pas Hamedan | Pro League | 29 | 1 | 1 | 0 | – | – | 30 | 1 |
| 2011–12 | Mes Sarcheshmeh | Pro League | 14 | 2 | 0 | 0 | – | – | 14 | 2 |
| 2012–13 | Pas Hamedan | Division 1 | 20 | 8 | 0 | 0 | – | – | 20 | 8 |
| 2013–14 | Zob Ahan | Pro League | 2 | 0 | 0 | 0 | – | – | 2 | 0 |
| 2014–15 | Saba Qom | Pro League | 18 | 0 | 0 | 0 | – | – | 18 | 0 |
| Career total | | | 111 | 11 | 3 | 0 | 0 | 0 | 114 | 11 |

- Assist Goals

| Season | Team | Assists |
|---|---|---|
| 10–11 | Pas Hamedan | 2 |
| 11–12 | Mes Sarcheshmeh | 0 |
| 12–13 | Pas Hamedan | 1 |
