= Farshad Salarvand =

Iranian footballer

Personal information
- Full name: Farshad Salarvand
- Date of birth: May 22, 1988 (age 38)
- Place of birth: Dorud, Iran
- Position: Midfielder

Team information
- Current team: Mes Rafsanjan
- Number: 97

Senior career*
Years	Team	Apps	(Gls)
2012–2013	Rahian Kermanshah	24	(6)
2013–2015	Mes Rafsanjan	43	(10)
2015–2017	Esteghlal Khuzestan	47	(3)
2017–2018	Pars Jonoubi Jam	10	(1)
2018–2019	Foolad	16	(0)
2019–2020	Machine Sazi	9	(1)
2020–	Mes Rafsanjan	0	(0)
- * Club domestic league appearances and goals

Farshad Salarvand (born May 22, 1988) is an Iranian football player, who currently plays for Mes Rafsanjan in the Persian Gulf Pro League.
