= Shahin Majidi =

Iranian footballer

Personal information
- Full name: Shahin Majidi
- Date of birth: May 22, 1988 (age 38)
- Place of birth: Karaj, Iran
- Position: Midfielder

Senior career*
Years	Team	Apps	(Gls)
2012–2013	Shahrdari Bandar Abbas	23	(6)
2013–2014	Aluminium Hormozgan	15	(1)
2014	Machine Sazi	13	(1)
2014–2015	Nassaji Mazandaran	10	(6)
2015–2016	Esteghlal Ahvaz	13	(0)
2016	Nassaji Mazandaran	17	(3)
2016–2017	Aluminium Arak	12	(1)
2017	Gol Gohar	9	(2)
2017–2018	Fajr Sepasi	33	(3)
2018	Nassaji Mazandaran	6	(0)
2019	Sorkhpooshan Pakdasht	6	(1)
2019–2020	Gol Reyhan Alborz	13	(2)
2020–2021	Nassaji Mazandaran	10	(8)
- * Club domestic league appearances and goals

Shahin Majidi (born May 22, 1988) is an Iranian football player who plays as a midfielder for the Persian Gulf Pro League.
