= Vinko Begović =

Croatian footballer and manager

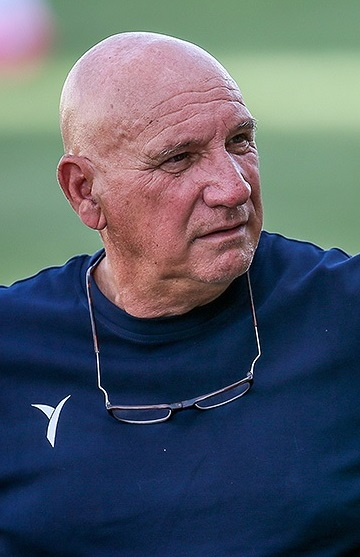

Personal information
- Date of birth: 2 October 1948 (age 78)
- Place of birth: Split, FPR Yugoslavia

Senior career*
Years	Team	Apps	(Gls)
1963–1968	Hajduk Split	13	(2)
1968–1969	Sloga Kraljevo		
1969–1970	Radnički Kragujevac	1	(0)
1970–1983	RNK Split		

Managerial career
- 1986–1987: RNK Split
- 1996–1997: HNK Šibenik
- 1999–2003: Foolad
- 2003–2004: Persepolis
- 2004–2005: Al-Wasl
- 2005–2006: Pegah Gilan
- 2006–2007: Iran U23 (Olympics team)
- 2007–2009: Pas Hamedan
- 2009–2011: Aluminium Hormozgan
- 2012–2013: Pas Hamedan
- 2013: Persepolis (assistant)
- 2013–2015: Mes Rafsanjan
- 2015–2016: Mes Kerman
- 2016–2019: Gol Gohar
- * Club domestic league appearances and goals

Vinko Begović (born 2 October 1948) is a Croatian football manager and former player.

== Managerial career ==
He has previously served as head coach of several clubs namely Foolad, Persepolis and Pegah Gilan of Iran, and Al-Wasl of the UAE. He was also manager of the Iran national under-23 football team for a short period in 2007. From December 2012 to March 2013, he was also assistant coach at Persepolis and also head coach of Persepolis B for three months.
