= Ahmad Jafari =

Iranian-American architect

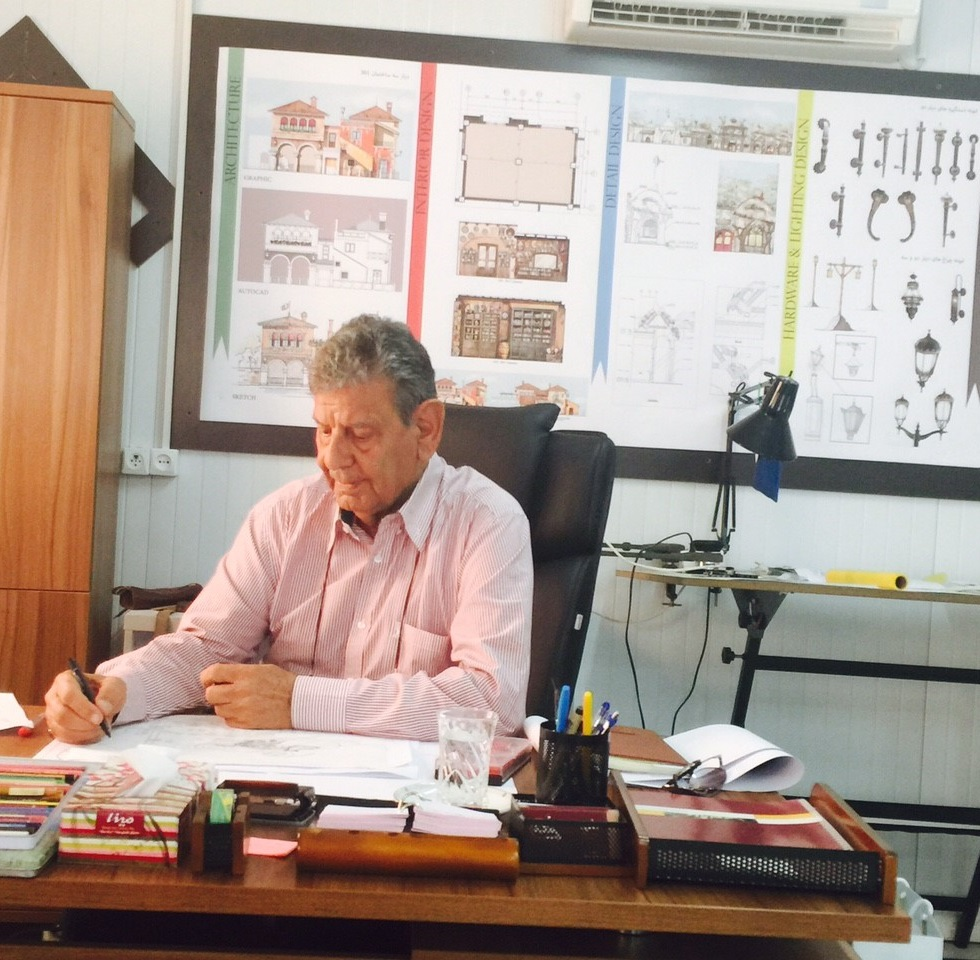
- Ahmad Jafari
- Born: 3 March 1938 (age 88); Arak, Iran
- Education: Tehran University; University of Utah
- Occupation: Architect
- Spouse: Malak Jafari
- Children: 3
- Awards: Disney NFFC Legend Award, 2006
- Practice: Disney, 1966-2004
- Design: Disneyland Paris

Ahmad Jafari (Persian: احمد جعفری ‌born 3 March 1938, in Arak, Iran) is an Iranian-American architect whose career began in the 1960s. He worked as an architect and art director at Walt Disney Imagineering from 1966 to 2004, collaborating with Walt Disney and several individuals later recognized as Disney Legends. In 2006, he received the NFFC Disney Legend Award.

== Early life ==
Ahmad Jafari was born on 3 March 1938, in the city of Arak, Iran. In 1962, he earned a master's degree in architecture from the University of Tehran. In 1963, he moved to the United States, where he continued his architectural studies at the University of Utah and worked as an intern architect at firms in both Utah and California.

After a few months, Jafari left the university and joined the Disneyland engineering department in 1966 as an architect. He served The Walt Disney Company as an architect and art director from 1966 to 2004.

Val H. Usle, Executive Director of Architecture at The Walt Disney Company, recognized Jafari for "35 magical years with The Walt Disney Company," stating:

"All of us still see your 'design' fingerprints scattered in the parks throughout the world... your creativity has helped define the Disney built environment. It is indeed a very small club of people [who] can claim to have had such involvement and influence."

== Career ==
Ahmad Jafari began his architectural career as the head architect at the Farmanfarma architectural firm, where he worked on projects including Mehrabad International Airport and the Azadi Sport Complex between 1968 and 1969. In 1969, he contributed to the development of a 10-year master plan for Disneyland. By 1971, he was promoted to lead designer for Disneyland, working alongside Disney studio directors and architects at WED Enterprises (now Walt Disney Imagineering) on various projects.

From 1972 to 1976, Jafari served as the lead architect for Big Thunder Mountain Railroad in California, collaborating closely with art director Tony Baxter. He later contributed to the design of Epcot in Florida, which opened on 1 October 1982. As the project design architect, he oversaw the Canada Pavilion (1977–1982) and the Morocco Pavilion (1980–1984). He was also involved in the conceptual work for the Africa Pavilion at Epcot.

Between 1982 and 1983, Jafari worked as lead designer and site theme inspector for Tokyo Disneyland in Urayasu, Japan. Beginning in 1986, he served as the chief architect for Western Land and Adventureland at Euro Disneyland (now Disneyland Paris), later relocating to France in 1988; the park opened on 12 April 1992. He also conducted a pre-opening site inspection of Fantasyland in 1992.

In 2000, Jafari founded the CDM Group in Los Angeles. In 2001, he was the chief architect and art director for the Tokyo DisneySea Hotel MiraCosta. That same year, he worked as chief design director on the Disney's Animal Kingdom Lodge in Florida, in collaboration with executive director Joe Rohde, as well as other art directors and architects.

Jafari also served as concept chief design director and design developer for Hong Kong Disneyland between 2001 and 2004. From 2004 to 2007, he worked with the Hettema Group as a design director on the Saraya project in Aqaba, Jordan, which included theming the Intercontinental Hotel. He later contributed to several major developments in the Middle East and Asia, including the Legend Project and SeaWorld Project in Dubai, and a major project at Kangwon Land in South Korea.

In 2009, Jafari returned to Disneyland Paris as a consultant for Walt Disney Imagineering (WDI) on the Ratatouille: The Adventure attraction. He continued consulting for WDI through 2011 on Main Street for Shanghai Disneyland Park, collaborating with the Gensler firm in Los Angeles. The park opened on 16 June 2016.

From 2013 to 2016, Jafari contributed to the design of themed environments in Iran, including Iran's first outdoor themed water park on Kish Island and the Hezaro Yek Shahr Project, Tehran's first theme park.

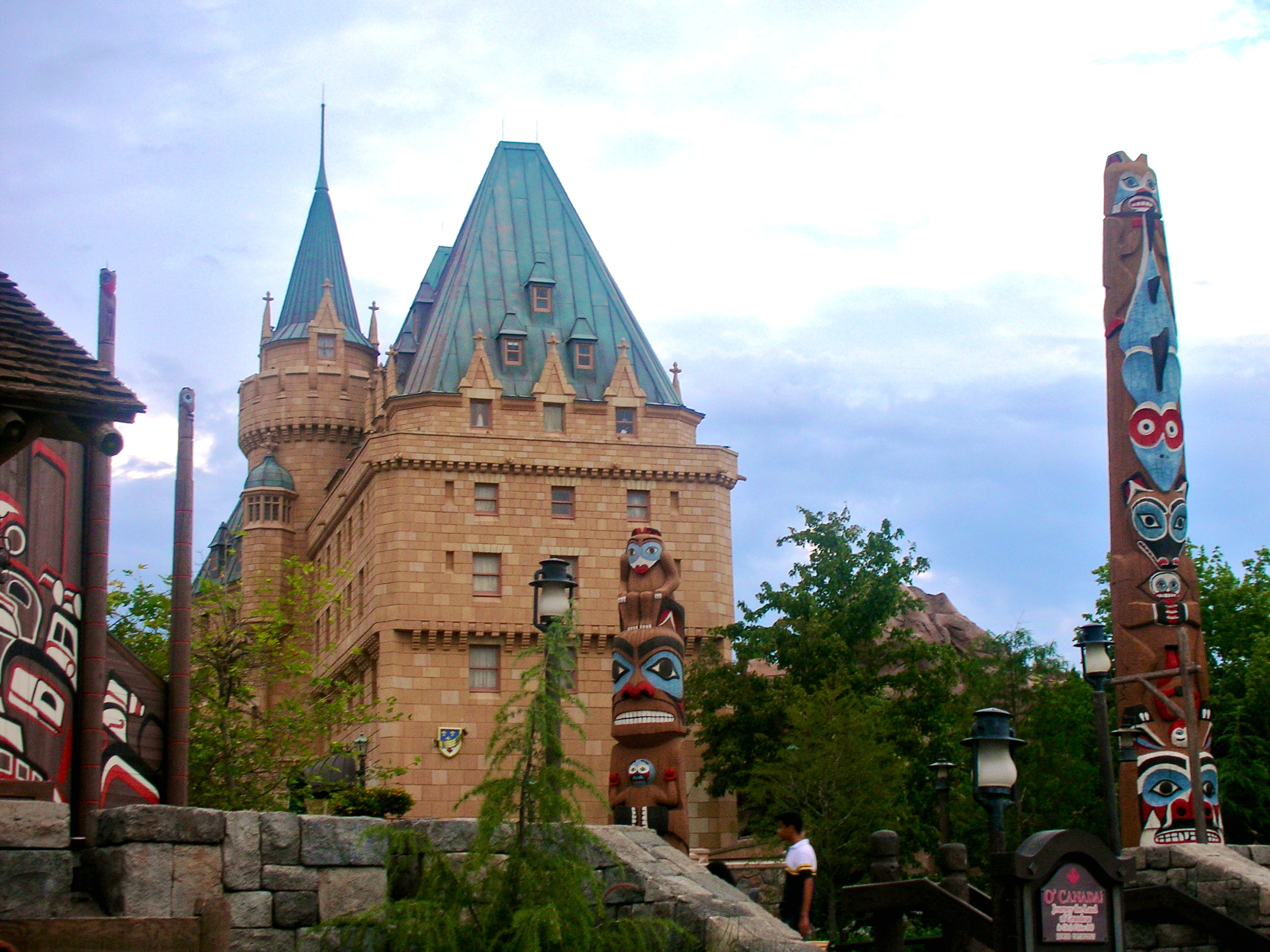
Canada Pavilion at Epcot, Walt Disney World in Orlando

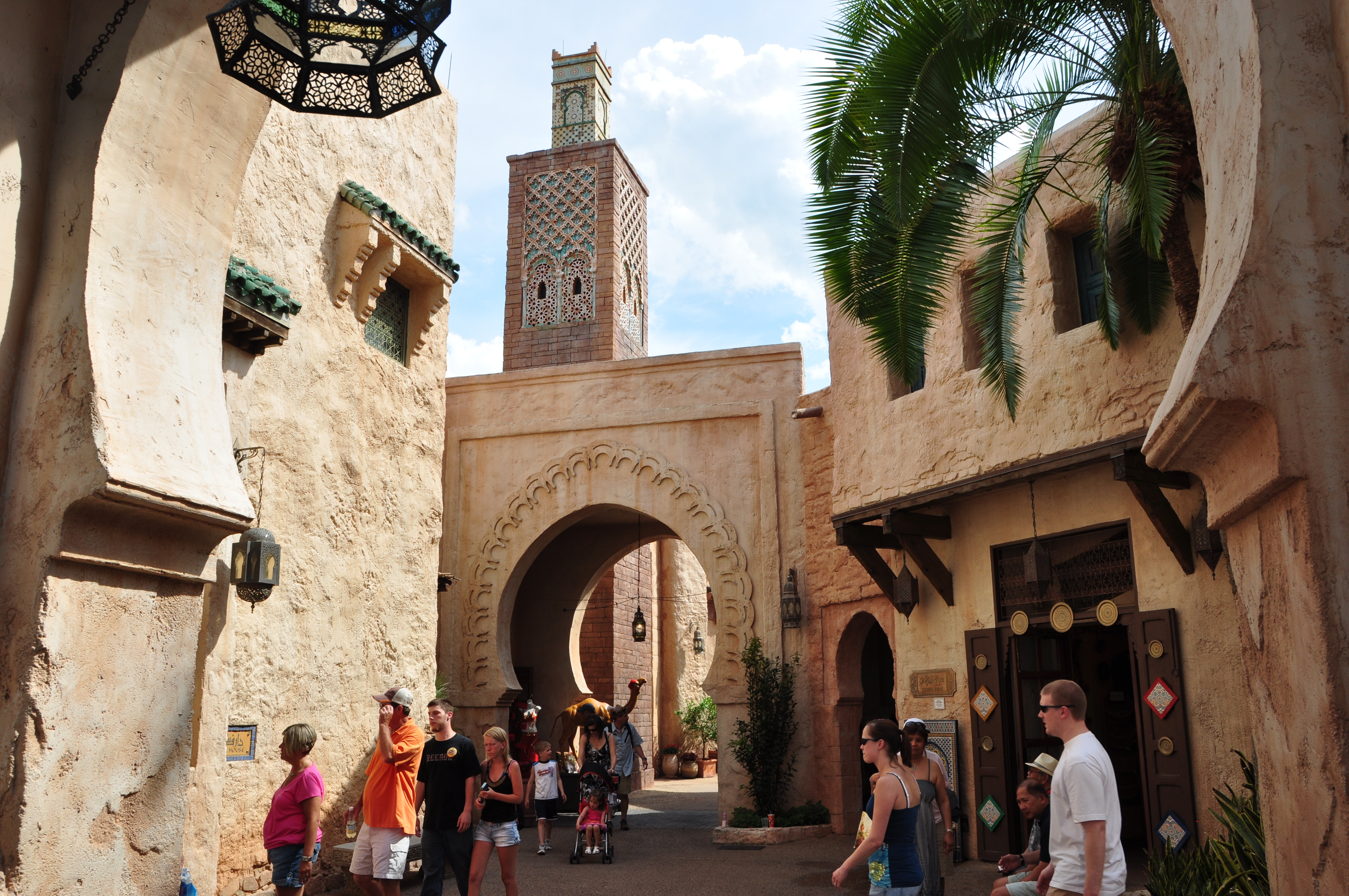
Morocco Pavilion at Epcot, Walt Disney World in Orlando

== Awards ==
- Disney Legend Award (2006)
- Walt Disney Imagineering Retirement Award – Presented for "Thanks for Imagineering the Dream"; at the time, only four individuals had received this honor.
- WED Enterprises and MAPO (Manufacturing and Production Organization) – Recognized for 15 years of service contributing to Disney engineering projects, including the Walt Disney World Monorail System.
- Worldwide Who's Who Professional of the Year, 2013
- Recognition for 25 years of distinguished service at The Walt Disney Company
- Recognition for 30 years of distinguished service
- Recognition for 35 years of service at The Walt Disney Company
- Aga Khan Award for Architecture (1994) – Nominated for the design of Adventureland in Disneyland Paris
- Tokyo DisneySea Certificate of Recognition
- National Fantasy Fan Club (NFFC) Disney Legend Award
- Disney Retirement Window – Presented upon retirement from Disney
- Participated in the 2006 Disney Legend Awards ceremony alongside Tony Baxter (former Vice President of Walt Disney Imagineering), Glen Durflinger, and Marty Sklar (then Vice Chairman and Principal Creative Executive of The Walt Disney Company)
- Disney Recreational Club Team Meeting, 1968 – Served as club chairman
- Disney Employee Recognition Award – Received alongside Marty Sklar
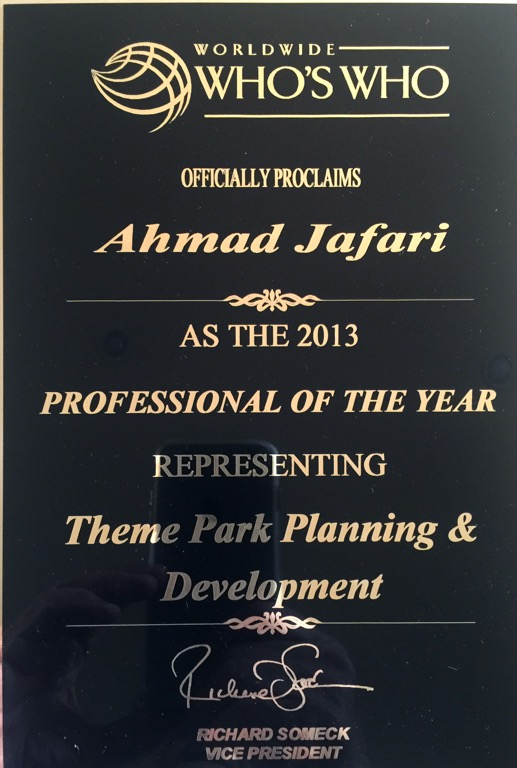
Ahmad's Who's Who Professional of the Year award, 2013

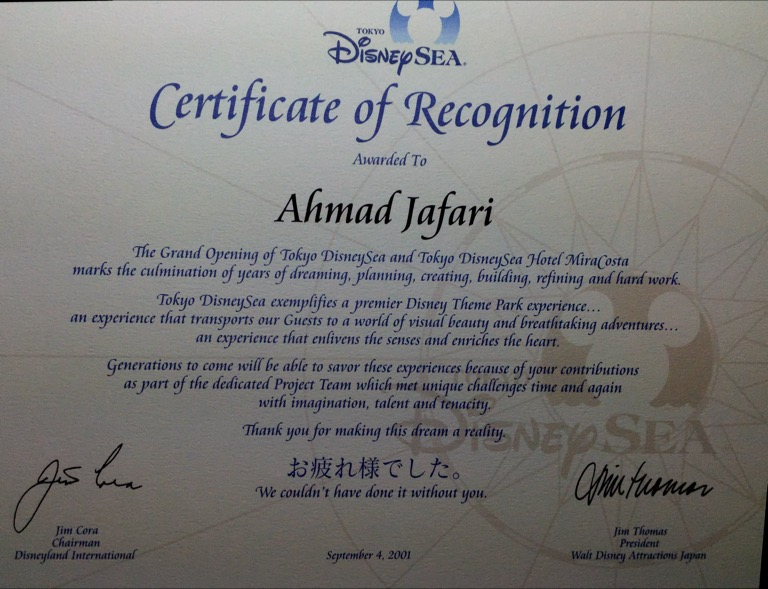
Tokyo DisneySea Certificate of Recognition

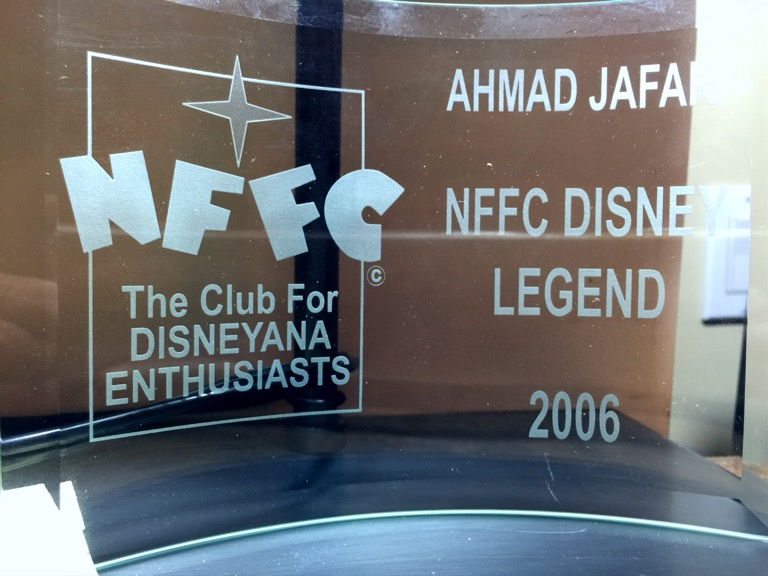
Ahmad's NFFC Disney Legend Award

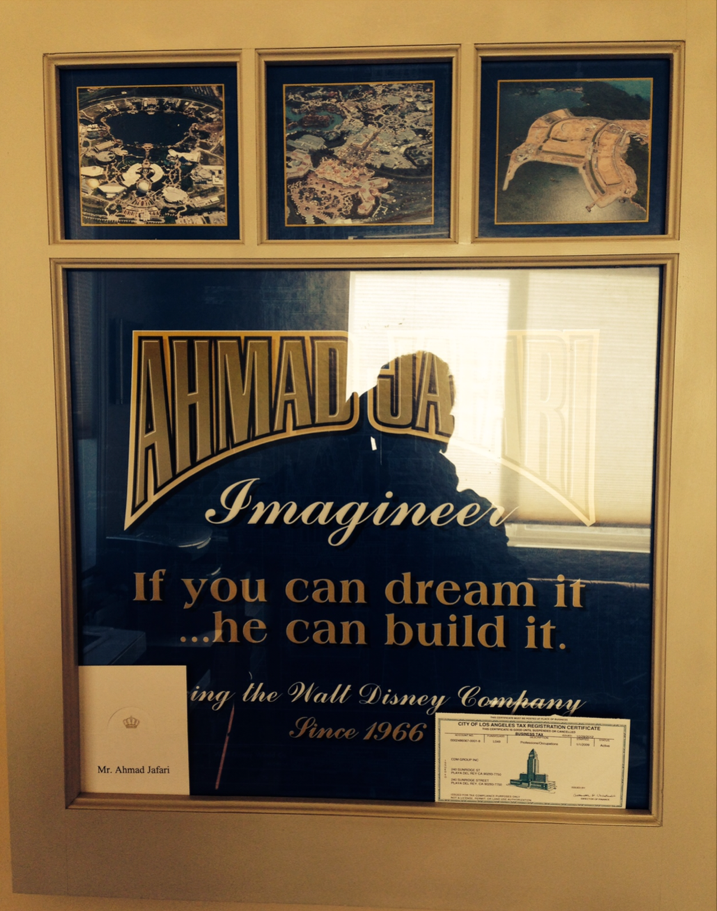
Ahmad's Disney Retirement Window

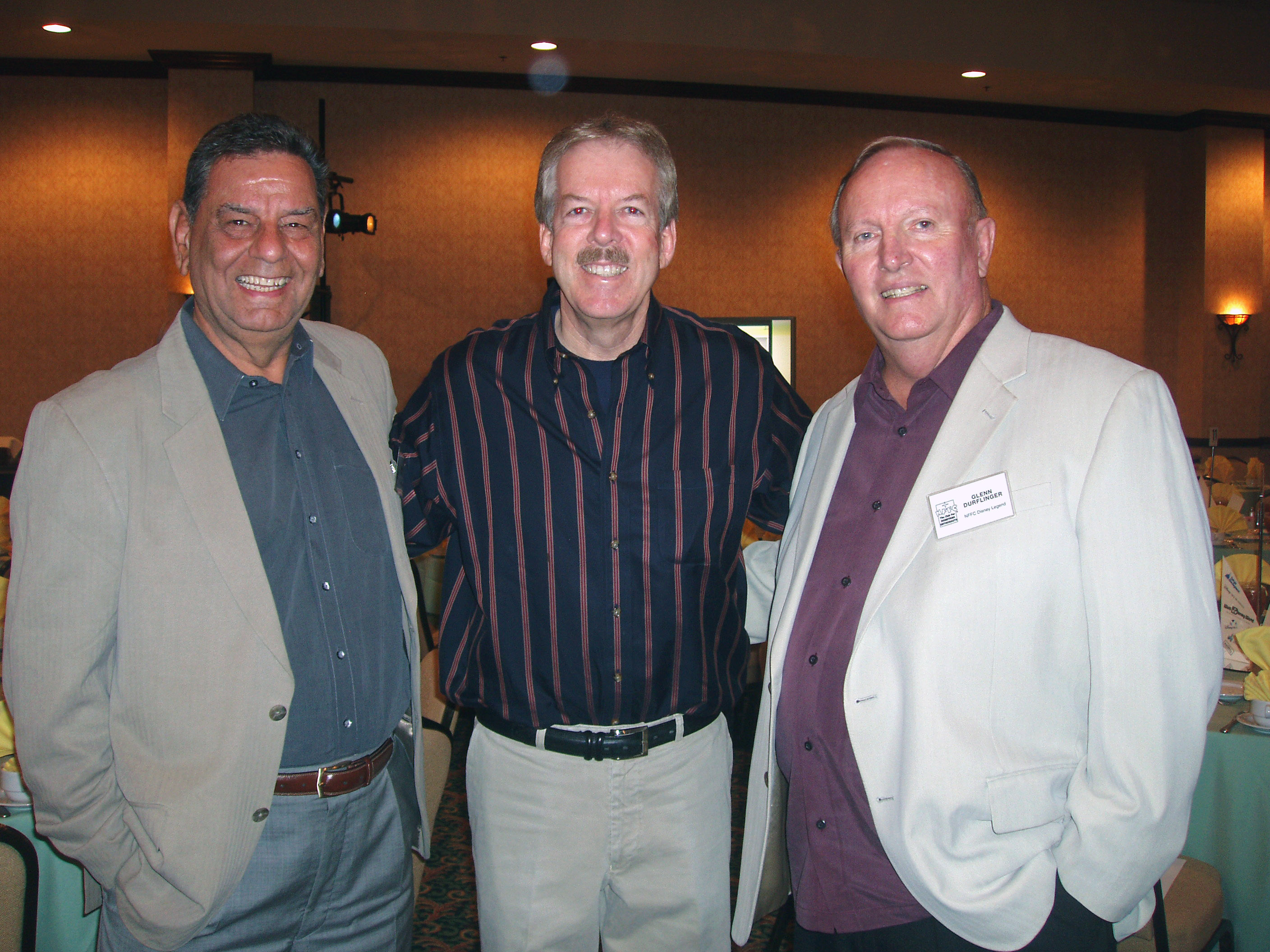
2006 Disney Legend awards, Ahmad, next to Tony Baxter, former vice president of alt Disney Imageeniering, and Glen Durflinger

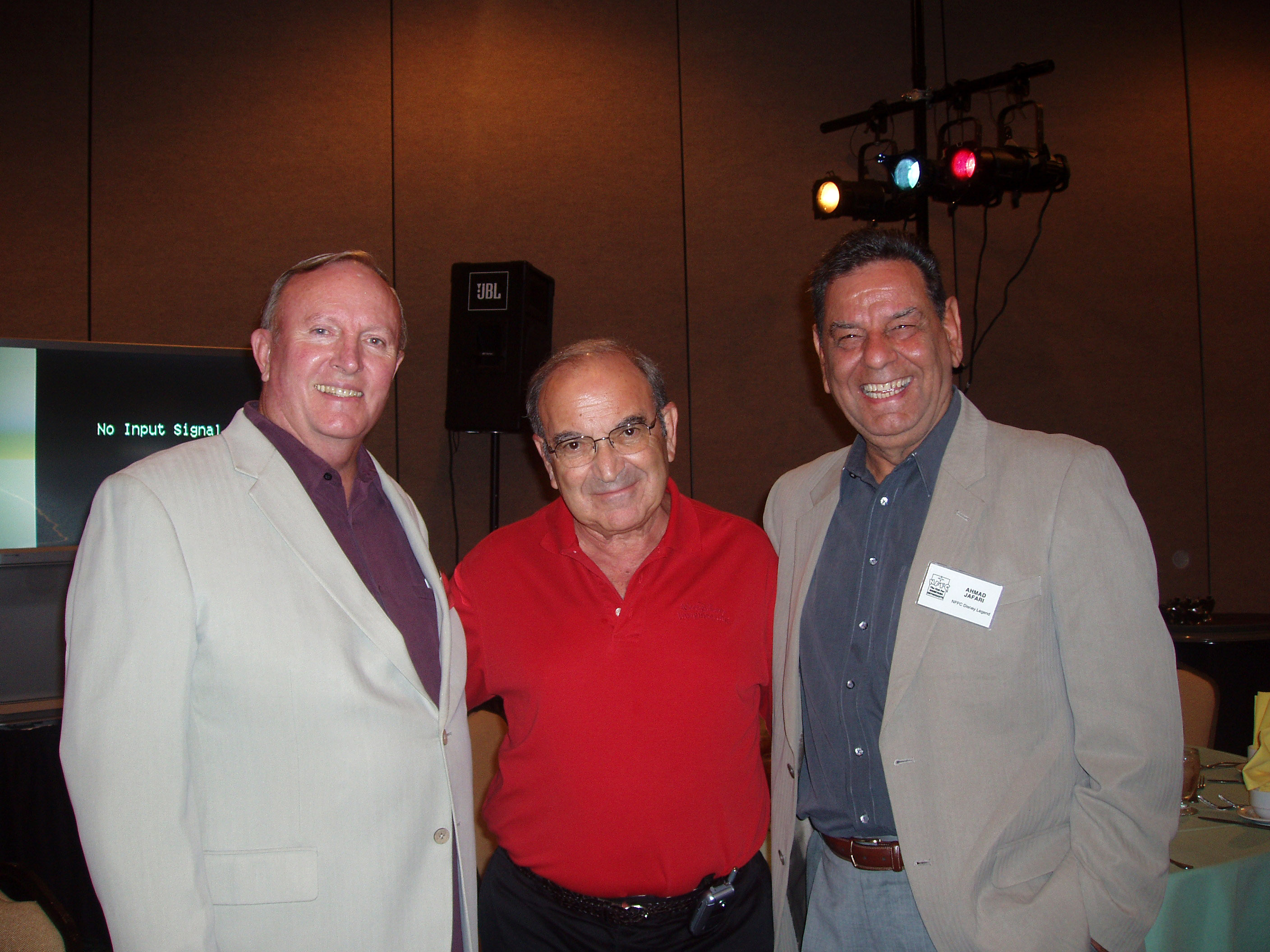
2006 Disney Legend awards, Ahmad, next to Marty Sklar, then vice chairman and principal creative executive of the Disney company, and Glen Durflinger

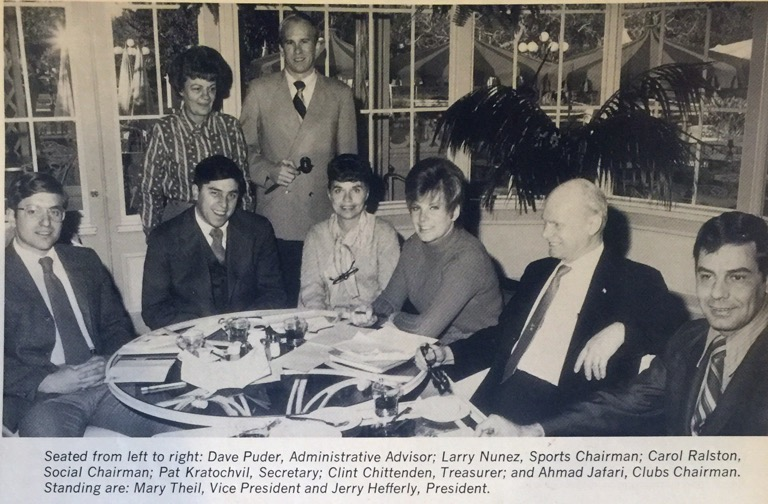
Disney Recreational Club Team Meeting, 1968. Ahmad, then club chairman, first from right

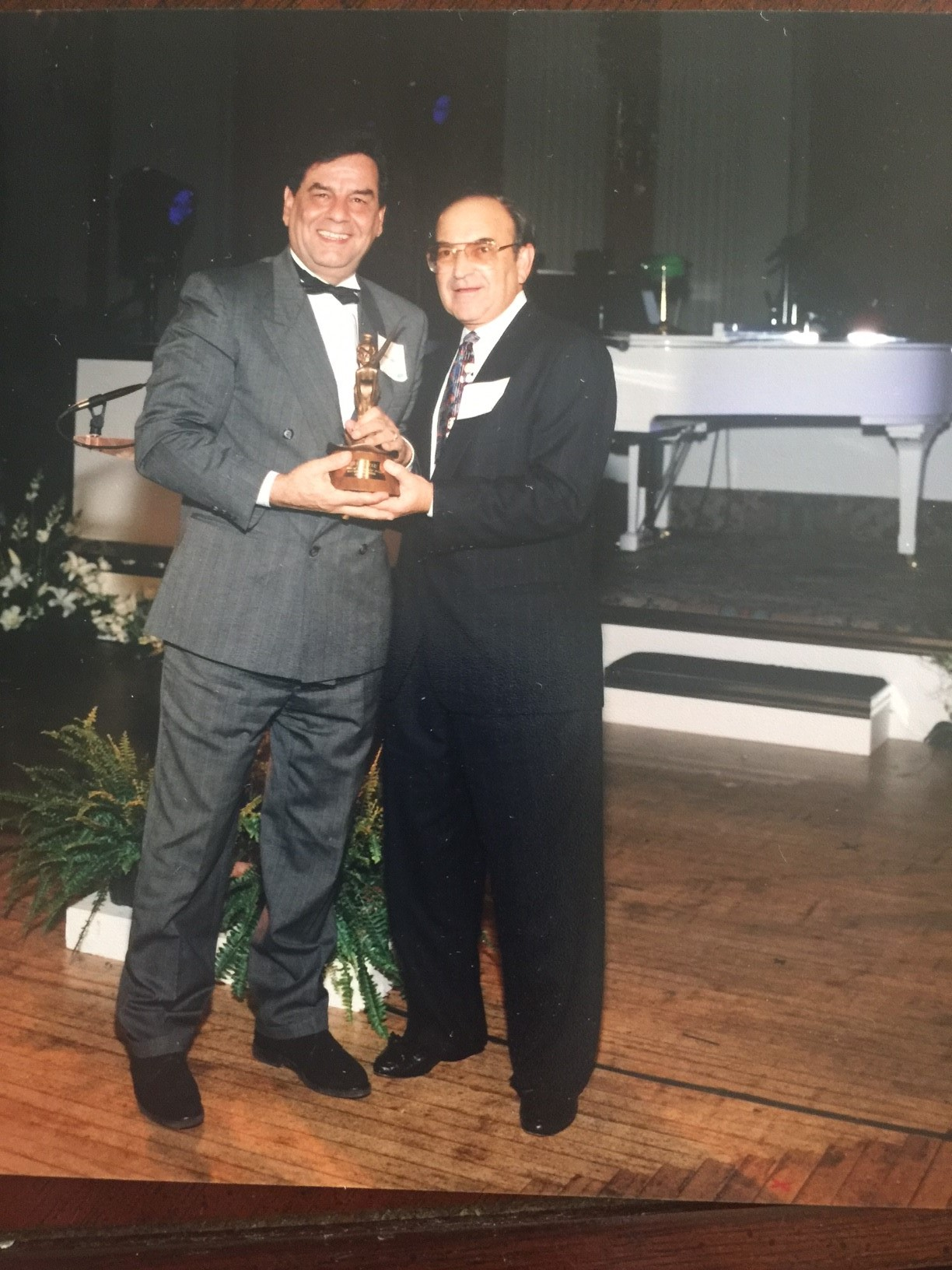
Disney Employee Recognition Award; Ahmad, next to Marty Sklar, then vice chairman and principal creative executive of the Disney company
