= Qods Stadium (Hamedan) =

Football stadium in Hamadan, Iran

- Full name: Qods Stadium
- Location: Hamedan, Iran
- Capacity: 8,000

Tenants
- PAS Hamedan F.C. (2007–); Alvand Hamedan F.C. (2012–)

Qods Stadium is a football stadium in Hamedan, Iran. It is currently used mostly for football matches, on club level by PAS Hamedan F.C. and Alvand Hamedan F.C. The stadium has a capacity of 8,000 spectators.

Saddam Hussein once bombed this stadium during a prayer on Qods Day at the time of the Iran–Iraq War.
