= Rahian Kermanshah F.C. =

Iranian football club

Rahiyan Kermanshah
- Full name: Rahiyan Kermanshah Football Club
- Founded: 2006
- Ground: Kargaran Stadium; Kermanshah; Iran
- Capacity: 1,000
- Chairman: Farman Karimi
- Head Coach: Edmond Yunanpour
- League: Azadegan League
- 2013–14: Azadegan League Group 2, 8th
| Home colours | Away colours |

Rahiyan Kermanshah Football Club (Persian: باشگاه فوتبال راهیان کرمانشاه) (formerly named Shirin Faraz) is an Iranian football club based in Kermanshah, Iran and compete in the Azadegan League. The club is in the private ownership of Farman Karimi.

== History ==
=== Establishment ===
Before the start of the 2006–07 season, Oghab, a team with much history, sold its right to participate in the Azadegan League to Shirin Faraz. In 2012 the club name and sponsorship changed to Rahian Kermanshah.

=== Promotion to Iran Pro League ===
The club achieved promotion to the Iran Pro League in 2007 after a 4–2 aggregate playoff victory against Tractor, along with Pegah Gilan.

=== Relegation ===
Shirin Faraz was relegated from the Persian Gulf Cup with 3 games remaining in the season. The team was plagued with coaching and management problems for most of the season and often fielded teams consisting mostly of players from their youth squad. They failed to gain promotion the season after and finished mid table in their group. In 2012 Farman Karimi took over the club and renamed it Rahian Kermanshah Football Club.

== Name history ==
- Shirin Faraz Kermanshah (2006–2012)
- Rahiyan Kermanshah (Since 2012)

Old logo used by club from 2006 to 2012

== Stadium ==
The 15 Khordad Stadium in Kermanshah has a capacity of 15,000.

== Season-by-season ==
The table below chronicles the achievements of Shirin Faraz in various competitions since 2006.

| Season | League | Position | Hazfi Cup | Notes |
|---|---|---|---|---|
| 2006–07 | Azadegan League | 2nd | First Round | Promoted |
| 2007–08 | Iran Pro League | 18th | 1/16 Final | Relegated |
| 2008–09 | Azadegan League | 7th | 1/16 Final |
| 2009–10 | Azadegan League | 6th | Second Round |
| 2010–11 | Azadegan League | 6th | Second Round |
| 2011–12 | Azadegan League | 11th | 1/16 Final |
| 2012–13 | Azadegan League | 5th |
| 2013–14 | Azadegan League | 8th | Third Round |

== Club managers ==
=== Managerial history ===
| Name | Period |
|---|---|
| (Iran) Faraz Kamalvand | 2006–07 |
| (Serbia) Miodrag Ješić | 2007 |
| (Iran) Mahmoud Fekri | 2007 |
| (Brazil) Marco Octavio | 2007– |
| (Iran) Shahram Mehrpeyma | 2008– |
| (Iran) Yaghob Vatani | 2008–09 |
| (Iran) Mahmoud Fekri | 2009–10 |
| (Iran) Edmond Yonanpour | 2010 |
| (Iran) Majid Aghajari | 2010–2011 |
| (Iran) Hadi Bargizar | 2011 |
| (Iran) Reza Mohajeri | 2011 |
| (Iran) Majid Aghajari | 2011 |
| (Iran) Omid Tayeri | 2012 |
| (Iran) Javad Zarincheh | 2012–2013 |
| (Iran) Edmond Yonanpour | 2013–2014 |

== Players ==
As of October 30, 2010.

=== First-team squad ===
Note: Flags indicate national team as defined under FIFA eligibility rules; some limited exceptions apply. Players may hold more than one non-FIFA nationality.

| No. | Pos. | Nation | Player |
|---|---|---|---|
| — | GK | IRI | Masoud Poormohamad |
| — | DF | IRI | Mahmood Khamisi |
| — | | IRI | Hadi Nasrollahi |
| — | DF | IRI | Saber Khosnam |
| — | MF | IRI | Karim Ahmadi |
| — | MF | IRI | Hamed Akbari |
| — | MF | IRI | Esmaeil Kiani |
| — | FW | CMR | Martin Ongfiang |
| — | DF | IRI | Hadi Mousavi |
| — | | IRI | Shirzad Ghahtan |
| — | DF | IRI | Majid Amiri |
| — | MF | IRI | Mohammad Norouzi |
| — | GK | CMR | Alphonse Assa |
| — | MF | IRI | Mohammed Arbabi |

| No. | Pos. | Nation | Player |
|---|---|---|---|
| — | GK | IRI | Saeed Ramazani |
| — | DF | IRI | Vahid Babaeinia |
| — | FW | CMR | Patrik Sullivan |
| — | FW | IRI | Kousha Bahaeipour |
| — | FW | IRI | Farshad Salarvand |
| — | MF | IRI | Sajjad Khosravi |
| — | MF | IRI | Hamed Zamani |
| — | DF | IRI | Babak Falamarzi |
| — | DF | IRI | Hesam Maghsodi |
| — | MF | IRI | Majid Gheitasi |
| — | MF | IRI | Sajjad Karimizand |
| — | DF | IRI | Jafar Heidari |
| — | FW | IRI | Mohammad Bagher Zaferani |

For recent transfers, see List of Iranian football transfers, summer 2010.
