= 2007–08 Persian Gulf Cup =

7th season of Persian Gulf Pro League

Persian Gulf Cup
- Season: 2007–08
- Champions: Persepolis; 2nd Pro League title 9th Iranian title
- Relegated: Sanat Naft; Shirin Faraz
- Champions League: Persepolis; Sepahan; Saba Battery; Esteghlal (Hazfi Cup champions)
- Matches: 306
- Goals: 721 (2.36 per match)
- Top goalscorer: Mohsen Khalili; Hadi Asghari (18 goals)
- Biggest home win: Rah Ahan 5–0 Paykan (11 March 2008); Persepolis 5–0 Shirin Faraz (30 April 2008)
- Biggest away win: Esteghlal 1–4 Pegah (11 April 2008); Fajr Sepasi 1–4 Zob Ahan (1 May 2008); Saba Battery 1–4 Persepolis (14 May 2008)
- Highest scoring: Paykan 4–2 Bargh Shiraz (16 August 2007); Persepolis 3–3 Fajr Sepasi (21 September 2007); Persepolis 3–3 Aboumoslem (10 February 2008); Esteghlal 4–2 Bargh Shiraz (29 February 2008); Saipa 4–2 Shirin Faraz (3 April 2008); Bargh Shiraz 3–3 Sepahan (3 May 2008); Zob Ahan 4–2 Est. Ahvaz (17 May 2008)
- Longest winning run: 4 matches Persepolis
- Longest unbeaten run: 16 matches Persepolis
- Longest winless run: 27 matches Shirin Faraz
- Longest losing run: 6 matches Shirin Faraz
- Highest attendance: 110,000; Persepolis – Sepahan (17 May 2008)
- Lowest attendance: 0 (spectator ban); Malavan – Zob Ahan (19 September 2007); Pegah – Shirin Faraz (16 November 2007); Sanat Naft – Saba Battery (16 November 2007); Sepahan – Pegah (22 January 2008); Persepolis – Sanat Naft (22 January 2008); Sepahan – Paykan (10 February 2008); Sepahan – Fajr Sepasi (22 February 2008); Sepahan – Zob Ahan (5 March 2008); Est. Ahvaz – Saba Battery (17 March 2008); Sepahan – Est. Ahvaz (3 April 2008); Sepahan – Mes Kerman (18 April 2008); Shirin Faraz – Pegah (5 May 2008)
- Total attendance: 3,303,000
- Average attendance: 11,235

The 2007–08 Persian Gulf Cup (also known as Iran Pro League) was the 25th season of Iran's Football League and seventh season of Iran Pro League since its establishment in 2001. Saipa were the defending champions. The season featured 13 teams from the 2006–07 Persian Gulf Cup and three new teams promoted from the 2006–07 Azadegan League: Shirin Faraz as champions, Pegah and Sanat Naft. PAS Hamedan replaced PAS Tehran. The league started on 16 August 2007 and ended on 17 May 2008. Persepolis won the Pro League title for the first time in their history (total ninth Iranian title).

== Teams ==
Team	City	Stadium	Manager	Nationality	Past season
Aboomoslem	Mashhad	Samen	Parviz Mazloomi	(Iran)	6th
Bargh	Shiraz	Hafezieh	Mahmoud Yavari	(Iran)	12th
Esteghlal	Tehran	Azadi	Firouz Karimi	(Iran)	4th
Esteghlal	Ahvaz	Takhti Ahvaz	Majid Jalali	(Iran)	2nd
Malavan	Anzali	Takhti Anzali	Mohammad Ahmadzadeh	(Iran)	14th
Mes	Kerman	Shahid Bahonar	Amir Ghalenoei	(Iran)	9th
Pas	Hamedan	Ghods	Vinko Begovic	(Croatia)	N/A
Paykan	Tehran	Iran Khodro	Ali Asghar Modir Roosta	(Iran)	7th
Pegah	Rasht	Sardar Jangal	Nader Dastneshan	(Iran)	Qualifier
Persepolis	Tehran	Azadi	Afshin Ghotbi	(Iran) (United States)	3rd
Rah Ahan	Tehran	Rah Ahan	Davoud Mahabadi	(Iran)	16th
Saba Battery	Tehran	Shahid Derakhshan	Yahya Golmohammadi	(Iran)	13th
Saipa	Karaj	Enghelab Karaj	Ali Daei	(Iran)	Champion
Sanat Naft	Abadan	Takhti Abadan	Ahmad Tousi	(Iran) (United States)	Qualifier
Sepahan	Esfahan	Naghsh Jahan	Jorvan Vieira	(Brazil) (Portugal)	5th
Sepasi	Shiraz	Hafezieh	Gholam Peyrovani	(Iran)	10th
Shirin Faraz	Kermanshah	Azadi Kermanshah	Shahram Mehrpeyma	(Iran)	Qualifier
Zob Ahan	Esfahan	Foolad Shahr	Bijan Zolfagharnasab	(Iran)	8th

Below is the list of coaches who left their teams after the start of the season.

Team	Name	Nationality
Aboomoslem	Khodadad Azizi	(Iran)
Esteghlal Ahvaz	Firouz Karimi	(Iran)
Esteghlal	Nasser Hejazi	(Iran)
Mes	Farhad Kazemi	(Iran)
Paykan	Samvel Darbinyan	(Armenia) (Russia)
Pegah	Majid Jahanpour	(Iran)
Rah Ahan	Akbar Misaghian	(Iran)
Saba Battery	Mohammad Hossein Ziaei	(Iran)
Sanat Naft	Ebrahim Ghasempour	(Iran)
Sepahan	Luka Bonačić	(Croatia)
Shirin Faraz	Marco Octavio	(Brazil)
Zob Ahan	Zoran Đorđević	(Serbia)

=== Participating in international competitions ===
2008 AFC Champions League

- Persepolis
- Sepahan

== Foreign players ==
Club	Player 1	Player 2	Player 3	Player 4	Former Players
Aboomoslem	(Brazil) Rodrigo Teixeira	(Nigeria) Daniel Olerum	(Serbia) Ivan Petrović	(Togo) Franck Atsou	(Bosnia and Herzegovina) Ivan Savorjest
Bargh Shiraz	(Iraq) Mohammed Nasser	(Uruguay) Freddy Freire	(Uruguay) Martín Barlocco		
Esteghlal Ahvaz	(Argentina) Carlos Soto	(Brazil) Fabrício Ceará			
Esteghlal Tehran	(Serbia) Srđan Urošević				
Malavan					
Mes Kerman	(Brazil) Edinho	(Brazil) Paulo Zaltron	(Mali) Sékou Fofana	(Nigeria) Uche Iheruome	(Uruguay) Gerardo Morales
PAS Hamedan	(Bosnia and Herzegovina) Emir Obuća	(Bosnia and Herzegovina) Faruk Ihtijarević	(Croatia) Sandro Tomić	(Serbia) Vladimir Mićović	
Paykan	(Cameroon) Guillaume N'Kendo	(Germany) Ronny Kockel	(Senegal) Ibrahima Touré		(Nigeria) Taribo West
Pegah	(Cameroon) Joël Tchami	(Cameroon) William Esenjo	(Georgia (country)) Akvsenti Gilauri	(North Macedonia) Saša Ilić	(Cameroon) Martin Abena
Persepolis	(Cameroon) Jacques Elong Elong	(Croatia) Mate Dragičević	(Paraguay) Jorge Gaona		
Rah Ahan	(Armenia) Gevorg Kasparov	(Armenia) Hamlet Mkhitaryan	(Brazil) Thiago Junio	(Uruguay) César Pellegrín	
Saba Battery	(Bosnia and Herzegovina) Alen Avdić	(Bosnia and Herzegovina) Almir Tolja	(Bosnia and Herzegovina) Marinko Mačkić		
Saipa	(Brazil) Adriano Alves	(Brazil) Evandro	(Mali) Alou Traoré	(Mali) Issa Traoré	
Sanat Naft	(Brazil) Léo	(Brazil) Renato Medeiros	(Uruguay) Marcelo de Souza		
Sepahan	(Iraq) Abdul-Wahab Abu Al-Hail	(Iraq) Emad Mohammed	(Iraq) Haitham Khadim Taher	(Nigeria) Kabir Bello	(Georgia (country)) Jaba Mujiri
Sepasi					
Shirin Faraz	(Mali) Alou Badra Djakité	(Serbia) Ivan Dragičević			(Serbia) Nenad Stojaković
Zob Ahan	(Armenia) Armen Tigranyan	(Brazil) Fábio Carvalho	(Ghana) Mohammed Martin	(Senegal) Issa Ndoye	(Armenia) Armen Ghazaryan

== Final classification ==
Pos	Team	Pld	W	D	L	GF	GA	GD	Pts	Qualification or relegation
1	Persepolis (C)	34	18	11	5	55	34	+21	59 (Note: Persepolis was deducted 6 points in issued by FIFA.)	Qualification for the 2009 AFC Champions League
2	Sepahan	34	17	10	7	53	38	+15	58 (Note: Sepahan was deducted 3 points in issued by Iranian Football Federation.)	Qualification for the 2009 AFC Champions League
3	Saba	34	13	13	8	41	37	+4	52	Qualification for the 2009 AFC Champions League
4	Aboumoslem	34	14	8	12	37	37	0	50	
5	Pas Hamedan	34	11	16	7	36	28	+8	49	
6	Zob Ahan	34	11	15	8	39	32	+7	48	
7	Bargh	34	11	14	9	43	47	−4	47	
8	Est. Ahvaz	34	11	13	10	61	51	+10	46	
9	Paykan	34	12	10	12	41	42	−1	46	
10	Mes	34	11	12	11	36	34	+2	45	
11	Saipa	34	12	9	13	33	35	−2	45	
12	Rah Ahan	34	11	11	12	45	40	+5	44	
13	Esteghlal	34	11	10	13	44	44	0	43	Qualification for 2009 AFC Champions League (Note: Esteghlal qualified to AFC Champions League by winning the Hazfi Cup)
14	Fajr	34	9	15	10	37	41	−4	42	
15	Pegah	34	9	11	14	26	35	−9	38	
16	Malavan	34	8	12	14	32	41	−9	36	
17	Sanat Naft (R)	34	9	8	17	37	46	−9	35	Relegation to the 2008–09 Azadegan League
18	Shirin Faraz (R)	34	3	12	19	25	59	−34	21	Relegation to the 2008–09 Azadegan League

Updated to match(es) played on 01 SEP 2018. Source: IPL Stats, Soccerway
Rules for classification: 1) Points; 2) Goal difference; 3) Goals scored.
(C) Champions; (R) Relegated

== Results table ==
Last updated March 17, 2008

Home \ Away	PRS	SEP	SAB	ABU	PAS	ZOB	PAY	BGH	ESA	MES	SAP	RAH	EST	FJR	PEG	MLV	SNA	SFZ
Persepolis		2–1	2–2	3–3	1–1	2–1	2–1	1–1	3–2	1–0	1–0	1–2	1–1	3–3	2–0	2–0	1–0	5–0
Sepahan	2–1		2–2	2–1	0–0	2–2	1–1	4–0	2–1	1–1	0–1	2–2	2–1	0–0	3–1	3–2	1–0	1–0
Saba Battery	1–4	0–1		0–1	1–0	1–0	1–1	2–2	2–2	0–1	2–1	2–0	0–0	0–0	1–0	3–0	3–1	2–2
Aboumoslem	0–3	2–1	0–1		0–0	3–2	0–0	2–1	1–1	2–1	1–0	1–0	2–0	3–1	3–1	2–1	2–1	1–0
PAS Hamedan	1–2	3–1	0–1	3–0		1–1	3–2	3–0	1–1	1–0	1–3	3–2	1–1	0–0	3–1	1–1	1–0	0–0
Zob Ahan	2–0	1–0	2–1	2–1	0–0		1–0	2–1	4–2	0–0	0–0	2–0	0–1	0–0	2–2	0–0	2–1	0–1
Paykan	1–2	1–2	0–1	0–0	2–1	2–0		4–2	2–0	1–1	0–1	2–2	3–2	0–3	1–1	0–1	0–0	2–0
Bargh Shiraz	0–1	3–3	1–1	1–0	1–1	0–0	1–1		1–1	2–1	2–0	1–0	1–1	0–0	1–0	0–2	3–2	1–0
Est. Ahvaz	4–1	3–2	4–1	1–0	2–2	1–1	1–2	2–1		2–2	1–2	2–3	1–2	4–1	3–2	0–0	0–0	3–1
Mes Kerman	0–0	1–1	0–1	1–1	2–0	1–1	2–3	1–3	2–1		2–1	2–1	1–0	0–0	2–0	1–0	0–1	1–2
Saipa	0–1	1–0	1–1	1–0	1–0	1–1	2–0	0–1	1–1	0–0		2–2	0–0	1–2	1–2	2–1	0–2	4–2
Rah Ahan	0–0	0–1	0–1	2–0	0–0	2–1	5–0	2–2	2–2	3–1	2–0		0–3	1–1	0–1	2–1	1–1	3–0
Esteghlal	1–1	0–1	1–1	1–1	0–1	1–2	1–2	4–2	3–2	1–1	1–2	2–1		1–1	1–4	2–0	2–3	2–1
Fajr Sepasi	0–2	0–2	3–1	2–1	1–1	1–4	1–1	0–1	2–2	1–3	1–1	0–1	1–2		2–0	2–1	2–0	2–2
Pegah	1–0	0–2	1–0	0–0	0–0	1–0	0–1	2–2	1–1	0–0	1–0	0–0	0–1	0–1		0–0	0–1	0–0
Malavan	1–1	1–2	1–1	2–1	0–0	1–1	0–1	1–1	0–2	2–1	1–2	2–1	2–1	2–1	1–1		0–0	2–2
Sanat Naft	2–3	2–2	2–3	2–0	1–2	1–1	2–1	1–3	2–3	1–2	2–0	0–2	2–1	1–2	0–1	1–2		2–1
Shirin Faraz	0–0	2–3	1–1	0–2	0–1	1–1	0–3	2–2	0–3	0–3	1–1	1–1	1–3	0–1	0–2	2–1	0–0	

Source: http://www.iplstats.com/
Legend: Blue = home team win; Yellow = draw; Red = away team win.

== Player statistics ==
=== Top goalscorers ===
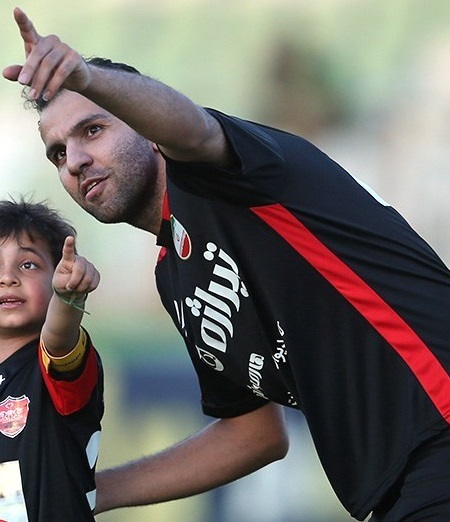
Mohsen Khalili

18

- (Iran) Hadi Asghari (Rah Ahan)
- (Iran) Mohsen Khalili (Persepolis)

13

- (Senegal) Ibrahima Touré (Paykan)

12

- (Iran) Ruhollah Bigdeli (Est. Ahvaz)
- (Iran) Fereydoon Fazli (Saba Battery)
- (Brazil) Leo (Sanat Naft)

10

- (Iran) Davoud Haghi (Est. Ahvaz)
- (Iran) Milad Meydavoodi (Est. Ahvaz)

9

- (Iran) Esmail Farhadi (Zob Ahan)
- (Iran) Seyed Mohammad Hosseini (Aboomoslem)
- (Iran) Mahmoud Karimi (Sepahan)
- (Iran) Saber Mirghorbani (Sanat Naft)
- (Iraq) Mohammad Nasser (Bargh Shiraz)
- (Iran) Bahman Tahmasebi (Fajr Sepasi)
- (Iran) Alireza Vahedi Nikbakht (Pesepolis)
- (Brazil) Zaltron (Mes Kerman)

8

- (Iran) Arash Borhani (Esteghlal)
- (Iran) Mohammad Gholamin (Pas Hamedan)
- (Iran) Mehdi Karimian (Bargh Shiraz)
- (Bosnia and Herzegovina) Emir Obuća (Pas Hamedan)
- (Iran) Jalal Rafkhaei (Malavan)
- (Iraq) Emad Reza (Foolad)

=== Top goalassistants ===
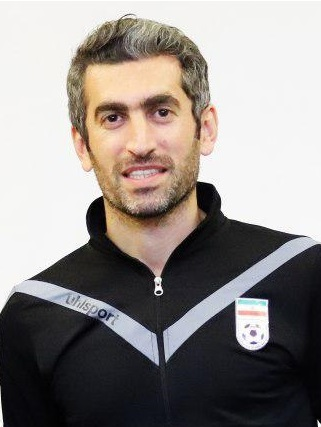
Mojtaba Jabbari

8

- (Iran) Davoud Haghi (Est. Ahvaz)
- (Iran) Mojtaba Jabari (Esteghlal)

7

- (Iran) Khosro Heidari (Pas Hamedan)
- (Iran) Mehdi Shiri (Bargh Shiraz)
- (Iran) Alireza Vahedi Nikbakht (Persepolis)

6

- (Iran) Abbas Aghaei (Persepolis)
- (Iran) Ehsan Hajsafi (Sepahan)
- (Iran) Reza Nasehi (Aboomoslem)
- (Iran) Mohammad Navazi (Esteghlal)
- (Iran) Ahmad Taghavi (Rah Ahan)

=== Cards ===
Player	Yellow card	Yellow card Red card	Red card	Team
(Iran) Hossein Pashaei	13	0	0	Rah Ahan
(Iran) Ali Haghdoost	10	2	0	Aboomoslem
(Mali) Alou Badra Djakité	11	1	0	Shirin Faraz
(Iran) Mohsen Bengar	11	0	0	Sepahan
(Iran) Morteza Kashi	10	1	0	Saba Battery
(Iran) Saber Mirghorbani	11	0	0	Sanat Naft
(Iran) Abouzar Rahimi	10	1	0	Rah Ahan
(Iran) Hossein Memar	9	0	1	Paykan
(Iran) Hanif Omranzadeh	9	0	0	Pas Hamedan
(Serbia) Ivan Petrović	8	0	1	Aboomoslem
(Iran) Mehrdad Pooladi	8	1	0	Esteghlal

=== Matches played ===
34

- (Iran) Mojtaba Shiri (Est. Ahvaz)

== Attendances ==
=== Average home attendances ===
Pos	Team	Total	High	Low	Average	Change
1	Persepolis	960,000	110,000	0	60,000	+78.0%
2	Esteghlal	590,000	90,000	5,000	34,706	−0.8%
3	Sanat Naft	200,000	15,000	0	12,500	n/a
4	Malavan	169,000	15,000	0	10,563	−2.1%
5	Pegah	145,000	15,000	0	9,063	n/a
6	Saipa	143,000	60,000	1,000	8,412	−21.1%
7	Mes Kerman	139,000	15,000	2,000	8,176	+18.1%
8	Est. Ahvaz	127,000	20,000	0	7,938	+26.7%
9	Saba Battery	126,000	90,000	1,000	7,412	+37.3%
10	Aboumoslem	118,000	35,000	1,000	6,941	−27.2%
11	PAS Hamedan	116,000	10,000	3,000	6,824	−14.0%
12	Sepahan	69,000	15,000	0	6,273	+3.4%
13	Bargh Shiraz	89,000	20,000	1,000	5,235	−6.0%
14	Shirin Faraz	76,000	7,000	0	4,750	n/a
15	Fajr Sepasi	73,000	20,000	1,000	4,294	−24.2%
16	Paykan	64,000	30,000	1,000	3,765	−40.5%
17	Zob Ahan	54,000	15,000	1,000	3,176	−22.5%
18	Rah Ahan	45,000	20,000	1,000	2,647	−35.0%
	League total	3,303,000	110,000	0	11,235	+11.0%

Updated to games played on 17 May 2008
Source: iplstats.com
Notes:
Matches with spectator bans are not included in average attendances
Pegah, Sanat Naft and Shirin Faraz played last season in Azadegan League
PAS Hamedan replaced PAS Tehran

=== Highest attendances ===
Rank	Home team	Score	Away team	Attendance	Date	Week	Stadium
1	Persepolis	2–1	Sepahan	110,000	17 May 2008	34	Azadi
2	Esteghlal	1–1	Persepolis	90,000	14 October 2007	9	Azadi
2	Saba Battery	1–4	Persepolis	90,000	14 May 2008	33	Azadi
4	Persepolis	0–0	Rah Ahan	85,000	16 September 2007	5	Azadi
5	Persepolis	1–1	Esteghlal	80,000	4 April 2008	26	Azadi
6	Persepolis	3–2	Esteghlal Ahvaz	70,000	19 October 2007	10	Azadi
6	Persepolis	1–0	Mes Kerman	70,000	4 November 2007	12	Azadi
6	Persepolis	1–0	Saipa	70,000	18 November 2007	14	Azadi
6	Persepolis	1–1	Bargh Shiraz	70,000	11 May 2008	32	Azadi
10	Persepolis	2–1	Paykan	65,000	7 September 2007	4	Azadi

Notes:
Updated to games played on 17 May 2008. Source: iplstats.com

== See also ==
- 2007–08 Azadegan League
- 2007–08 Iran Football's 2nd Division
- 2007–08 Iran Football's 3rd Division
- 2007–08 Hazfi Cup
- Iranian Super Cup
- 2007–08 Iranian Futsal Super League
