= PAS Hamedan F.C. =

Iranian football club

PAS Hamedan پاس همدان
- Full name: PAS Hamedan Football Club
- Nicknames: Great PAS, Champion of Asia, Hegmatane Soldiers, Greens
- Founded: 2007; 19 years ago
- Ground: Qods Stadium; Hamedan
- Capacity: 8,000
- Chairman: Amir Azimi
- Head Coach: Siamak Farahani
- League: Football's 2nd Division
- 2021–22: Azadegan League, 15th (Relegated)
| Home colours | Away colours |

PAS Hamedan Football Club (Persian: باشگاه فوتبال پاس همدان, Bashgah-e Futbal-e Pas-e Hemedan) is an Iranian football club based in Hamedan, Iran and compete in the Azadegan League. The club was formed after the dissolution of Pas Tehran in 2007.

== History ==
=== Establishment ===
PAS Hamedan was formed on June 9, 2007, as a result of the dissolution of PAS Tehran. The team was initially named Alvand Hamedan after the Alvand mountain range in Hamedan, however after much deliberation it was changed to PAS Hamedan. PAS stands for Piroozi Esteghamat Sarfarazi (esteghamat starts with Aleph (A) in Persian).

=== Doping Scandal ===
In July 2008, it was revealed that numerous players and staff members were involved in distributing illegal doping substances. Midfielders Saeed Daghighi and Faruk Ihtijarević were banned for six months after testing positive for doping in a match against Rah Ahan. Team translator Reza Chalangar and head athletic trainer Morad-Ali Teymouri were found to have been distributing the substances and were banned for four years from involvement in any Iranian sport. In addition, the team was fined for 25,000 Swiss Francs.

=== Persian Gulf Cup ===
PAS Hamedan initially enjoyed some success in the IPL. They finished 5th in the 2007–2008 but the team dropped in the rankings in their next three IPL seasons and eventually got relegated in the 2010–2011 season.

=== Azadegan League ===
PAS appointed Faraz Kamalvand in their first season in the Azadegan League as they aimed to get promoted back to the IPL. He was sacked in the mid-season break due to poor results and was replaced with Vinko Begović. The team finished the season in 4th place and they failed to get promoted to the IPL.

PAS Novin Hamedan was promoted from the Iran Football's 2nd Division to the Azadegan League following the 2011–12 season and now plays under the name Alvand Hamedan in Group A of the 2012–13 Azadegan League.

PAS finished the 2012–13 Azadegan League (Group B) in 3rd place and qualified to the promotion play-offs following the disqualification of Shahrdari Tabriz over a match-fixing scandal. In the first round of the play-offs PAS defeated Mes Sarcheshmeh 3–2 (2–1, 1–1) after two matches, but lost 5–3 (4–2, 1–1) to Zob Ahan Isfahan in the second round.

== Season-by-season ==
The table below chronicles the achievements of Pas in various competitions since 2007 until 2022.

| Year | Division | Position | Hazfi Cup |
|---|---|---|---|
| 2007-08 | Iran Pro League | 5th | Quarterfinals |
| 2008–09 | Iran Pro League | 13th | Semifinals |
| 2009–10 | Iran Pro League | 15th | Fourth Round |
| 2010–11 | Iran Pro League | 16th | Fourth Round |
| 2011–12 | Div 1 | 4th Group B | Second Round |
| 2012–13 | Div 1 | 3rd | N/A |
| 2013–14 | Div 1 | 9th Group B | Third Round |
| 2014–15 | Div 1 | 3rd Group B | Fourth Round |
| 2015–16 | Div 1 | 16th | Did not enter |
| 2016–17 | Div 2 | 6th Group C first round | First Round |
| 2017–18 | Div 2 | 9th Group C first round | Did not enter |
| 2018–19 | Div 2 | 3rd Group B | Did not enter |
| 2019–20 | Div 2 | 2nd Group B Play-off Loser | Fourth Round |
| 2020–21 | Div 2 | 10th Group B | Fourth Round |
| 2021–22 | Div 2 | 12th Group B | Did not enter |

== Players ==
=== First-team squad ===
as of January 5, 2016 Note: Flags indicate national team as defined under FIFA eligibility rules; some limited exceptions apply. Players may hold more than one non-FIFA nationality.

| No. | Pos. | Nation | Player |
|---|---|---|---|
| 2 | DF | IRN | Milad Sadeghian |
| 3 | DF | IRN | Mohammad Sadegh Karami |
| 4 | DF | IRN | Mohsen Varzkar |
| 8 | MF | IRN | Jamal Masoumi |
| 11 | FW | IRN | Arman Ramezani |
| 13 | DF | IRN | Vahid Jalalinia |
| 14 | MF | IRN | Hossein Kazemi |
| 17 | MF | IRN | Saeid Kheradmand |
| 18 | MF | IRN | Mohsen Lotfi ^{U23} |
| 19 | DF | IRN | Amin Pourali |
| 20 | MF | IRN | Mohsen Azarpad |
| 21 | MF | IRN | Armin Talaeimanesh |
| 22 | GK | IRN | Masoud Pourmohammad |
| 23 | MF | IRN | Mohammad Reza Molaei |
| 27 | DF | IRN | Nader Hooshyar |
| 30 | FW | IRN | Nima Partoei |

| No. | Pos. | Nation | Player |
|---|---|---|---|
| 55 | DF | IRN | Navid Khosh Hava |
| 62 | MF | IRN | Majid Gholamnejad |
| 70 | MF | IRN | Davoud Shahvaraghi |
| 77 | MF | IRN | Ahmad Jamshidian (captain) |
| 99 | GK | IRN | Mohammadreza Khazaei |
| — | GK | IRN | Mohammadreza Saberizadeh ^{U21} |
| — | | IRN | Mohsen Lashni ^{U23} |
| — | | IRN | Reza Karami ^{U23} |
| — | | IRN | Milad Jan Jan ^{U23} |
| — | | IRN | Mohammad Ghofrani ^{U23} |
| — | | IRN | Javad Tale' Moheb ^{U23} |
| — | | IRN | Milad Salehi ^{U23} |
| — | | IRN | Mehdi Mohammadi ^{U23} |
| — | | IRN | Mohammad Khademi ^{U21} |
| — | | IRN | Nima Ataei ^{U21} |
| — | | IRN | Amir Mohammad Rezaei ^{U21} |

For recent transfers, see List of Iranian football transfers summer 2013.

=== Managers ===
| Name | Period |
|---|---|
| (Croatia) Vinko Begović | 2007–2009 |
| (Iran) Ali Reza Mansourian | 2009 |
| (Iran) Ali Asghar Modir Roosta | 2009–2010 |
| (Iran) Mahmoud Yavari | 2010–2011 |
| (Iran) Ali Asghar Modir Roosta | 2011 |
| (Iran) Faraz Kamalvand | 2011–2012 |
| (Croatia) Vinko Begović | 2012–2013 |
| (Iran) Omid Tayeri | 2013 |
| (Iran) Mojtaba Khorshidi | 2013–2014 |
| (Iran) Mohsen Ashouri | 2014 |
| (Iran) Davoud Mahabadi | 2014–2015 |
| (Iran) Reza Talaeimanesh | 2015–2016 |
| (Iran) Akbar Mohammadi | 2016–2017 |
| (Iran) Ali Latifi | 2017– |

== Honours ==
As PAS Tehran

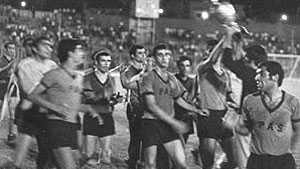
Pas players celebrating their first league championship in 1967

=== Domestic ===
- Tehran Province League: (1)
  - 1966–67
- Iran championship cup: (2)
  - 1967, 1968
- Iranian Football League: (5)
  - 1976–77, 1977–78, 1991–92, 1992–93, 2003–04

=== Continental ===
- Asian Club Championship:

(gold) Winners (1): 1992–93

=== Intercontinental ===
- Afro-Asian Club Championship: (1)
  - Runner-up: 1993

=== International ===
- IFA Shield (IFA): (Note: Fourth oldest club cup, organized by the Indian Association and played between Indian clubs and other invited ones.) 1970: Runners-up
