= 2011–12 Saba Qom F.C. season =

Saba Qom F.C.
2011–12 season
- Chairman: Mojtaba Ramezan-Beygi
- Manager: Abdollah Veysi
- Stadium: Yadegar Emam Stadium
- IPL: 4th
- Hazfi Cup: Quarter-final
- Top goalscorer: League: Reza Enayati (18); All: Reza Enayati (20)
Home colours	Away colours

The 2011–12 season was Saba Qom Football Club's 8th season in the Iran Pro League, and their 8th consecutive season in the top division of Iranian football. They are also competing in the Hazfi Cup and 10th year in existence as a football club.

== Club ==
=== Coaching staff ===
Position	Staff
Head coach	Abdollah Veysi
Assistant coach	Naser Bakhtiarizadeh
Assistant coach	Houshang Loveinian
Team Manager	Mohammadreza Keshvari-Fard
Doctors	Valiollah Gerayeli-Malek
Physiotherapists	Kasra Kazemi
Equipment managers	Amir Sekoudan

=== Other personnel ===
Position	Staff
Chairman	Mojtaba Ramezan-Beygi
Media Officer	Ali Ebrahimi Kalachayeh

=== Grounds ===
Ground (capacity and dimensions)	Yadegar Emam Stadium (10,610 / )

=== Kit ===
Supplier: Majid
Sponsor(s): Vegal

Home Kit	Away Kit

== Player ==
=== First team squad ===
Note: Flags indicate national team as defined under FIFA eligibility rules; some limited exceptions apply. Players may hold more than one non-FIFA nationality.

No.	Pos.	Nation	Player
1	GK	IRN	Hamed Lak
2	DF	IRN	Morteza Kashi (Captain)
3	DF	IRN	Mojtaba Mobini Pour
4	DF	IRN	Masoud Haghjou
5	DF	IRN	Sohrab Bakhtiarizadeh
6	MF	IRN	Mehdi Badrlou
7	MF	IRN	Akbar Sadeghi
8	MF	IRN	Mohsen Bayat
9	MF	IRN	Milad Nouri
10	FW	IRN	Mohsen Khalili
11	DF	IRN	Majid Houtan
12	MF	CMR	David Wirikom
13	DF	IRN	Mohammad Aram Tab
14	DF	IRN	Saeid Lotfi
15	DF	IRN	Meysam Khosravi
16	FW	IRN	Farid Karimi

No.	Pos.	Nation	Player
17	MF	IRN	Abdolfazl Ebrahimi
18	FW	IRN	Karim Eslami
19	FW	IRN	Bahman Tahmasbi
20	DF	IRN	Majid Heidari
21	GK	IRN	Farshad Ghadiri
22	GK	IRN	Mehrdad Tahmasbi
23	MF	IRN	Mohammad Arab Khorasani
24	FW	IRN	Iman Razaghirad
25	FW	IRN	Milad Soleiman Fallah
26	DF	IRN	Saeed Sadeghi
27	DF	IRN	Ramin Rezaian
29	DF	IRN	Davoud Bahadori
30	FW	IRN	Mehdi Momeni
31	DF	IRN	Rasoul Bakhtiarizadeh
33	MF	IRN	Hossein Maleki
40	GK	IRN	Mohammad Reza Vafaei

== Transfers ==
Confirmed transfers 2011–12

=== Summer ===
In: Note: Flags indicate national team as defined under FIFA eligibility rules; some limited exceptions apply. Players may hold more than one non-FIFA nationality.

No.	Pos.	Nation	Player
1	GK	IRN	Ahmad Khormali (from Aluminium Hormozgan)
7	MF	IRN	Mahmoud Tighnavard (from Aluminium Hormozgan)
12	DF	IRN	Rasoul Boroush (from Shahrdari Yasuj)
14	FW	IRN	Hossein Hejazipour (from Shahrdari Yasuj)
17	MF	IRN	Majid Houtan (from Nassaji Mazandaran)
18	MF	IRN	Karim Eslami (from Etka Gorgan)
25	MF	IRN	Milad Soleiman Fallah (from Saipa Mehr Karaj)
6	MF	IRN	Mehdi Badrlou (from Aluminium Hormozgan)
10	FW	IRN	Reza Enayati (from Sepahan)
5	DF	IRN	Akbar Sadeghi (from Sanati Kaveh)
9	MF	IRN	Milad Nouri (from Esteghlal Ahvaz)
30	FW	IRN	Yaser Karami (from Saba Qom Academy)
32		IRN	Mohammad Arab Khorasani (from Saba Qom Academy)
35		IRN	Mohsen Karami (from Saba Qom Academy)
40	GK	IRN	Mohammad Reza Vafaei (from Saba Qom Academy)
34		IRN	Mojtaba Mobini Pour (from Saba Qom Academy)

Out: Note: Flags indicate national team as defined under FIFA eligibility rules; some limited exceptions apply. Players may hold more than one non-FIFA nationality.

No.	Pos.	Nation	Player
1	GK	IRN	Mehdi Vaezi (to Steel Azin)
5	DF	IRN	Saeed Khani (to Aboomoslem)
6	DF	IRN	Abolfazl Hajizadeh (to Shahrdari Tabriz)
10	MF	IRN	Davoud Haghi (to Zob Ahan)
12	MF	IRN	Ahmad Taghavi (to Aluminium Hormozgan)
15	MF	BRA	Wando da Costa Silva (to (Brazil) Vila Nova)
17	MF	IRN	Vahid Nemati (to Fajr Sepasi)
20	MF	IRN	Alireza Mirshafian (to Pas Hamedan)
25	MF	BRA	Paulo Almeida (to (Brazil) Rio Branco)
9	FW	IRN	Hadi Asghari (released)
11	FW	IRN	Mohsen Bayatinia (to Mes Kerman)
14	FW	IRN	Farzad Hatami (to Sepahan, Loan Return)
7	MF	IRN	Alireza Nikbakht (to Paykan)

=== Winter ===
In: Note: Flags indicate national team as defined under FIFA eligibility rules; some limited exceptions apply. Players may hold more than one non-FIFA nationality.

No.	Pos.	Nation	Player
20	DF	IRN	Majid Heidari (from Fajr Sepasi)
7	MF	IRN	Ali Molaei (from Mes Sarcheshmeh)

Out: Note: Flags indicate national team as defined under FIFA eligibility rules; some limited exceptions apply. Players may hold more than one non-FIFA nationality.

No.	Pos.	Nation	Player
14	FW	IRN	Hossein Hejazipour (to Rah Ahan)

== Competitions ==
=== Overview ===
Competition	Started round	Current position / round	Final position / round	First match	Last match
2011–12 Persian Gulf Cup	—	—	4th	2 August 2011	11 May 2012
2011–12 Hazfi Cup	Round of 32	—	Quarter-Final	October 26, 2011	December 19, 2011

Source: Competitions

=== Iran Pro League ===
==== Standings ====
Pos	Team	Pld	W	D	L	GF	GA	GD	Pts	Qualification or relegation
2	Tractor Sazi	34	19	9	6	57	32	+25	66	Qualification for the 2013 AFC Champions League group stage
3	Esteghlal	34	19	9	6	58	34	+24	66	Qualification for the 2013 AFC Champions League group stage
4	Saba Qom	34	12	14	8	40	38	+2	50	Qualification for the 2013 AFC Champions League qualifying play-off
5	Naft Tehran	34	13	10	11	36	38	−2	49	
6	Zob Ahan	34	9	18	7	29	33	−4	45	

Updated to match(es) played on 11 May 2012. Source: varzesh3.com
Rules for classification: 1) points; 2) goal difference; 3) number of goals scored.

==== Results summary ====
Overall								Home						Away					
Pld	W	D	L	GF	GA	GD	Pts	W	D	L	GF	GA	GD	W	D	L	GF	GA	GD
34	12	14	8	40	38	+2	50	6	9	2	23	15	+8	6	5	6	17	23	−6

Last updated: 25 February 2011.
Source: Ipl Stats

==== Results by round ====
Round	1	2	3	4	5	6	7	8	9	10	11	12	13	14	15	16	17	18	19	20	21	22	23	24	25	26	27	28	29	30	31	32	33	34
Ground	A	H	A	H	A	H	A	H	A	H	H	A	H	A	H	A	H	H	A	H	A	H	A	H	A	H	A	A	H	A	H	A	H	A
Result	W	D	W	W	L	W	W	W	L	L	W	W	D	D	L	D	D	D	W	W	D	D	L	W	L	D	L	W	D	L	D	D	D	D
Position	2	3	1	1	3	3	2	2	3	4	3	3	3	3	4	4	5	5	4	4	4	4	4	4	5	4	5	4	4	4	4	4	4	4

Updated to match(es) played on 25 February 2011. Source: "Ipl".
A = Away; H = Home; W = Win; D = Draw; L = Loss

=== Hazfi Cup ===
==== Matches ====
Win Draw Loss

October 26, 2011 1/32	Saba Qom	2–1	Payam Mokhaberat	Yadegar Emam Stadium
		imandaily.ir irna.ir		Attendance: 100

November 27, 2011 1/16	Mes Sarcheshmeh	0–0	Saba Qom
		farsnews.com

December 19, 2011 1/8	Saba Qom	1–1	Mes Kerman	Yadegar Emam Stadium
		farsnews.com

=== Friendly Matches ===
Win Draw Loss

July 24, 2011	Esteghlal	1–3	Saba Qom	Tehran
18:15 UTC+04:30	Yousefi 40'	Farsnews report ILNA report	Enayati 1', 6'; Eslami 36'	Stadium: Azadi Stadium; Attendance: 2,000

== See also ==
- 2011–12 Persian Gulf Cup
- 2011–12 Hazfi Cup
