= 2012–13 Saba Qom F.C. season =

Saba Qom
2012–13 season
- Chairman: Mohammadreza Keshvari Fard
- Manager: Yahya Golmohammadi; Samad Marfavi
- Stadium: Yadegar Emam Stadium
- IPL: 9th
- Champions League: Qualifying play-off
- Hazfi Cup: Round of 16
- Top goalscorer: League: Farid Karimi (7 goals); All: Farid Karimi (7 goals)
- Highest home attendance: 10,000
- Lowest home attendance: 1,000
- Average home league attendance: 2,920
Home colours	Away colours

The 2012–13 season are the Saba Football Club's 9th season in the Iran Pro League, and their 9th consecutive season in the top division of Iranian football. They are also competing in the Hazfi Cup and AFC Champions League, and 11th year in existence as a football club.

== Club ==
=== Coaching staff ===
Position	Staff
Head coach	(Iran) Samad Marfavi
Assist coach	(Iran) Saket Elhami
Assist coach	(Iran) Naser Bakhtiarizadeh
Assist coach	(Iran) Reza Mohtasham
Assist coach	(Iran) Hamid Motahari
Physiotherapist	(Iran) Dr. Hossein Ghasem Abadi
Doctor	(Iran) Dr. Nasser Etlaghi
Team Manager	(Iran) Hossein Nejati

=== Golmohammadi's Coaching staff ===
Position	Staff
Head coach	(Iran) Yahya Golmohammadi
Assist coach	(Iran) Mojtaba Hosseini
Assist coach	(Iran) Naser Bakhtiarizadeh

=== Other personnel ===
Position	Staff
Chairman	(Iran) Mohammadreza Keshvari Fard
Media Officer	(Iran) Golamreza Maleki

Munition Team
(Iran) Amir Sakoodan
(Iran) Aliakbar Sarlak

=== Grounds ===
Ground (capacity and dimensions)	Yadegar Emam Stadium (10,610 / )

=== Kit ===
Supplier: Majid
Sponsor(s): Vegal

Home Kit	Away Kit

== Player ==
=== Iran Pro League squad ===
As of 31 January 2013. Esteghlal F.C. Iran Pro League Squad 2011–12

Note: Flags indicate national team as defined under FIFA eligibility rules; some limited exceptions apply. Players may hold more than one non-FIFA nationality.

No.	Pos.	Nation	Player
1	GK	IRI	Hamed Lak
2	DF	IRI	Morteza Kashi (Captain)
3	DF	IRI	Mojtaba Mobini Pour
4	DF	IRI	Masoud Haghjou
5	DF	IRI	Sohrab Bakhtiarizadeh
6	MF	IRI	Mehdi Badrlou
7	MF	IRI	Akbar Sadeghi
8	MF	IRI	Mohsen Bayat
9	MF	IRI	Milad Nouri
10	FW	IRI	Mohsen Khalili
11	DF	IRI	Majid Houtan
12	MF	CMR	David Wirikom
13	DF	IRI	Mohammad Aram Tab
14	DF	IRI	Saeid Lotfi
15	DF	IRI	Meysam Khosravi
16	FW	IRI	Farid Karimi

No.	Pos.	Nation	Player
17	MF	IRI	Abdolfazl Ebrahimi
18	FW	IRI	Karim Eslami
19	FW	IRI	Bahman Tahmasbi
20	DF	IRI	Majid Heidari
21	GK	IRI	Farshad Ghadiri
22	GK	IRI	Mehrdad Tahmasbi
23	MF	IRI	Mohammad Arab
24	FW	IRI	Iman Razaghirad
25	FW	IRI	Milad Soleiman Fallah
26	DF	IRI	Saeed Sadeghi
27	DF	IRI	Ramin Rezaian
29	DF	IRI	Davoud Bahadori
30	FW	IRI	Mehdi Momeni
31	DF	IRI	Rasoul Bakhtiarizadeh
33	MF	IRI	Hossein Maleki
40	GK	IRI	Mohammad Reza Vafaei

=== AFC Champions League squad ===
As of 23 June 2013. Sabaye Qom F.C. Champions League Squad 2013

Note: Flags indicate national team as defined under FIFA eligibility rules; some limited exceptions apply. Players may hold more than one non-FIFA nationality.

No.	Pos.	Nation	Player
1	GK	IRI	Hamed Lak
2	DF	IRI	Morteza Kashi (Captain)
3	MF	CMR	David Wirikom
4	DF	IRI	Masoud Haghjou
5	DF	IRI	Sohrab Bakhtiarizadeh
6	MF	IRI	Mehdi Badrlou
7	MF	IRI	Akbar Sadeghi
9	MF	IRI	Milad Nouri
13	MF	IRI	Majid Houtan
14	DF	IRI	Saeid Lotfi
15	DF	IRI	Meysam Khosravi

No.	Pos.	Nation	Player
16	MF	IRI	Farid Karimi
17	MF	IRI	Abdolfazl Ebrahimi
18	MF	IRI	Karim Eslami
21	DF	IRI	Mohsen Bayat
22	FW	IRI	Mohammad Arab
23	DF	IRI	Mojtaba Mobini Pour
24	FW	IRI	Iman Razaghirad
25	FW	IRI	Milad Soleiman Fallah
27	DF	IRI	Ramin Rezaian
28	GK	IRI	Mehrdad Tahmasbi
30	FW	IRI	Mehdi Momeni

== Transfers ==
Confirmed transfers 2012–13

=== Summer ===
In: Note: Flags indicate national team as defined under FIFA eligibility rules; some limited exceptions apply. Players may hold more than one non-FIFA nationality.

No.	Pos.	Nation	Player
—	DF	IRI	Saeed Lotfi (from Shahrdari Arak)
—	MF	IRI	Meysam Khodashenas (from Nassaji Mazandaran)
—	FW	IRI	Bahman Tahmasbi (from Aluminium Hormozgan)
—	MF	IRI	Abdolfazl Ebrahimi (from Aluminium Hormozgan)
—	FW	IRI	Mohsen Khalili (from Mes Kerman)
—	GK	IRI	Farshad Ghadiri (from Mes Kerman)
—		IRI	Masoud Haghjou (from Shahrdari Arak)
—		IRI	Mehrdad Tahmasbi (from Kaveh Tehran)
—	DF	IRI	Mohammad Aram Tab (from Aluminium Hormozgan)
—	MF	IRI	Mehdi Momeni (from Foolad)
—	MF	IRI	Farid Karimi (from Steel Azin)
—	MF	CMR	David Wirikom (from Shirin Faraz)

Out: Note: Flags indicate national team as defined under FIFA eligibility rules; some limited exceptions apply. Players may hold more than one non-FIFA nationality.

No.	Pos.	Nation	Player
16	MF	IRI	Vahid Hamdinejad (to Naft Tehran)
7	FW	IRI	Ali Molaei (to Fajr Sepasi)
10	FW	IRI	Reza Enayati (to Mes Kerman)
7	FW	IRI	Ali Molaei (to Fajr Sepasi)
1	GK	IRI	Ahmad Khormali (Released)
22	GK	IRI	Masoud Gholamalizad (Released)
4	DF	IRI	Sohrab Bakhtiarizadeh (Released)
15	MF	IRI	Masoud Keshvari Fard (Released)
21	MF	IRI	Morteza Hashemizadeh (Released)
3	DF	IRI	Hamid Reza Farzaneh (Released)
23	FW	IRI	Ahmad Davoudi (Released)
—	MF	IRI	Hossein Gohari (Released)
—		IRI	Meysam Mohajer (Released)
—	DF	IRI	Rasoul Berosh (from Damash Gilan)

=== Winter ===
In: Note: Flags indicate national team as defined under FIFA eligibility rules; some limited exceptions apply. Players may hold more than one non-FIFA nationality.

No.	Pos.	Nation	Player
24	FW	IRI	Iman Razaghirad (from Rah Ahan)
5	DF	IRI	Sohrab Bakhtiarizadeh (from Free Agent)
15	DF	IRI	Meysam Khosravi (from Free Agent)

Out: Note: Flags indicate national team as defined under FIFA eligibility rules; some limited exceptions apply. Players may hold more than one non-FIFA nationality.

No.	Pos.	Nation	Player
10	FW	IRI	Mohsen Khalili (Released)

== Competitions ==
=== Overview ===
Competition	Started round	Current position / round	Final position / round	First match	Last match
2012–13 Persian Gulf Cup	—	—	9th	19 July 2012	10 May 2013
AFC Champions League	Qualifying play-off	—	Qualifying play-off	February 9, 2013	February 9, 2013
2012–13 Hazfi Cup	Round of 32	—	Round of 16	14 December 2012	21 December 2012

Source: Competitions

=== Iran Pro League ===
==== Standings ====
Pos	Team	Pld	W	D	L	GF	GA	GD	Pts
7	Persepolis	34	12	14	8	41	31	+10	50
8	Rah Ahan	34	12	12	10	49	39	+10	48
9	Saba Qom	34	10	15	9	37	33	+4	45
10	Saipa	34	11	12	11	37	33	+4	45
11	Damash	34	11	10	13	36	47	−11	43

Updated to match(es) played on 10 May 2013. Source: IPL stats.com
Rules for classification: 1) points; 2) goal difference; 3) number of goals scored.

==== Results summary ====
Overall								Home						Away					
Pld	W	D	L	GF	GA	GD	Pts	W	D	L	GF	GA	GD	W	D	L	GF	GA	GD
34	10	15	9	37	33	+4	45	5	8	4	20	17	+3	5	7	5	17	16	+1

Last updated: 8 March 2013.
Source: Ipl Stats

==== Results by round ====
Round	1	2	3	4	5	6	7	8	9	10	11	12	13	14	15	16	17	18	19	20	21	22	23	24	25	26	27	28	29	30	31	32	33	34
Ground	H	A	H	A	H	A	A	H	A	H	A	H	A	H	A	H	A	A	H	A	H	A	H	H	A	H	A	H	A	H	A	H	A	H
Result	W	W	L	W	D	L	D	W	L	D	L	D	W	D	L	L	D	W	D	W	D	D	W	D	D	L	D	D	L	W	D	W	D	L
Position	1	1	4	3	5	6	7	4	7	7	10	19	9	9	11	12	13	11	11	7	7	8	6	7	7	10	8	9	10	9	10	8	8	9

Updated to match(es) played on 8 March 2013. Source: "Ipl".
A = Away; H = Home; W = Win; D = Draw; L = Loss

==== Matches ====
Win Draw Loss

July 19, 2012 1	Saba Qom	4–0	Paykan	Qom
20:45 UTC+04:30	Nouri 3', 67'; Bayat 42'; Rezaian 83'	IPLStats Report; Goal Report		Stadium: Yadegar Emam Stadium; Attendance: 1,000; Referee: Mohsen Torki

July 25, 2012 2	Zob Ahan	1–2	Saba Qom	Isfahan
22:00 UTC+04:30	Ashouri 52'; Babak (yellow card) 59'	IPLStats Report; Goal Report	Sadeghi (yellow card) 27'; Lotfi (yellow card) 61'; Nouri 82', 90+1'	Stadium: Foolad Shahr; Attendance: 1,000; Referee: Seyyed Mehdi Seyyed Ali

July 30, 2012 3	Saba Qom	1–3	Malavan	Qom
22:00 UTC+04:30	Rezaian 9'; Haghjou (red card) 69'; Houtan (red card) 74'	IPLStats Report; Goal Report; Report	Rafkhaei 26', 70' (pen.), 83' (pen.) (yellow card); Badamaki (yellow card) 21'; Jafari (yellow card) 90'	Stadium: Yadegar Emam Stadium; Attendance: 5,000; Referee: Hassan Akrami

August 05 2012 4	Persepolis	0–2	Saba Qom	Tehran
22:30 UTC+04:30	Bengar (yellow card) 53'; Hosseini (yellow card) 90+1'	IPLStats Report; Goal Report	Bayat (yellow card) 72'; Lak (yellow card) 74'; Soleiman Fallah 75' (yellow card) 76'; Sadeghi 89' (pen.)	Stadium: Azadi Stadium; Attendance: 67,678; Referee: Mohsen Torki

August 17, 2012 5	Saba Qom	1–1	Fajr Sepasi	Qom
22:00 UTC+04:30	Wirikom 28'	IPLStats Report; Goal Report	Hosseini 65'; Imani (yellow card)	Stadium: Yadegar Emam Stadium; Attendance: 3,000; Referee: Mohsen Ghahremani

August 23, 2012 6	Sanat Naft	2–1	Saba Qom	Abadan
20:15 UTC+04:30	Navidkia 6'; Arab 70' (pen.); Aleksanyan (yellow card) 83' (yellow-red card)	IPLStats Report; Saba Report	Karimi 15' (yellow card); Bayat (yellow card); Heidari (yellow card)	Stadium: Takhti Stadium; Attendance: 4,000; Referee: Ghahsem Vahedi

August 28, 2012 7	Tractor Sazi	0–0	Saba Qom	Tabriz
17:30 UTC+04:30	Kiani (yellow card) 90'	IPLStats Report; Goal Report	Ebrahimi (yellow card) 74'; Haghjou (yellow card) 86'; Lak (yellow card) 88'	Stadium: Yadegar-e Emam Stadium; Attendance: 10,000; Referee: Ahmad Salehi

September 15, 2012 8	Saba Qom	1–0	Gahar Zagros	Qom
18:35 UTC+04:30	Soleiman Fallah (yellow card); Momeni (yellow card); Rezaian 90+4'	IPLStats Report; Goal Report	Nayebi (yellow card)	Stadium: Yadegar Emam Stadium; Attendance: 500; Referee: Jamshid Mohammadi

September 21, 2012 9	Naft Tehran	1–0	Saba Qom	Tehran
17:25 UTC+03:30	Shakouri 78'; Mousavi (yellow card) 94' (yellow-red card)	report		Stadium: Shahid Dastgerdi Stadium; Attendance: 3,000; Referee: Mohsen Torki

September 26, 2012 10	Saba Qom	3–3	Damash Gilan	Qom
17:15 UTC+03:30	Nouri 30', 41'; Momeni 85'	report report	Motevaselzadeh 25'; Hajizadeh (yellow card) 29'; Ebrahimi (yellow card) 35'; Jahanbakhsh 35'; Kiani 55'	Stadium: Yadegar Emam Stadium; Attendance: 1,000; Referee: Jamshid Daneshmehr

October 1, 2012 11	Esteghlal	1–0	Saba Qom	Tehran
18:45 UTC+03:30	Borhani 1'; Sadeghi (yellow card)	report Summary	Heidari (yellow card); Lotfi (yellow card)	Stadium: Azadi Stadium; Attendance: 10,000; Referee: Ahmad Salehi

19 October 2012 12	Saba Qom	1–1	Sepahan	Qom
17:50 UTC+03:30	Badrlou (yellow card); Mobini Pour (yellow card); Soleiman Fallah 90+4'	report Summary	Ahmadi (yellow card); Jahan Alian (yellow card); Ebrahimi 90+1'	Stadium: Yadegar Emam Stadium; Attendance: 4,000; Referee: Mohsen Ghahremani

26 October 2012 13	Aluminmium	0–1	Saba Qom	Bandar Abbas
19:00 UTC+03:30	Dehghani (yellow card)	report Summary	Milad Nouri (yellow card); Bayat (yellow card); Farid Karimi (yellow card) (goal) 80'	Stadium: Takhti Stadium; Attendance: 6,000; Referee: Alireza Faghani

31 October 2012 14	Saba Qom	0–0	Foolad	Qom
15:30 UTC+03:30	Sadeghi (yellow card)	reportSummary	Karami (yellow card)	Stadium: Yadegar Emam Stadium; Attendance: 1,000; Referee: Mohsen Torki

18 November 2012 15	Saipa	2–0	Saba Qom	Karaj
15:15 UTC+03:30	Sadeghi (yellow card); Gholamnejad (yellow card) (goal) 78' (pen.); Shahalidoost (yellow card); Rezaei 83'	reportSummary	Kashi (yellow card); Milad Nouri (yellow card); Rezaian (yellow card)	Stadium: Enghelab Karaj; Attendance: 1,000; Referee: Reza Kermanshahi

28 November 2012 16	Saba Qom	0–1	Rah Ahan	Qom
15:15 UTC+03:30		report	Abdi 54'	Stadium: Yadegar Emam Stadium; Attendance: 1,000; Referee: Shahin Haj Babaei

3 December 2012 17	Mes Kerman	0–0	Saba Qom	Kerman
15:00 UTC+03:30		report		Stadium: Shahid Bahonar Stadium; Attendance: 2,000; Referee: Seyed Hossein Zargar

25 December 2012 18	Paykan	1–4	Saba Qom	Tehran
15:00 UTC+03:30	Vahdani 78'	report	Karimi 18', 30'; Rezaian 64'; Soleiman Fallah 89'	Stadium: Shahid Dastgerdi Stadium; Attendance: 1,000; Referee: Mouood Bonyadifar

30 December 2012 19	Saba Qom	0–0	Zob Ahan	Qom
14:00 UTC+03:30		report		Stadium: Yadegar Emam Stadium; Attendance: 1,000; Referee: Seyyed Mehdi Seyyed Ali

4 January 2013 20	Malavan	0–1	Saba Qom	Anzali
15:00 UTC+03:30	Maeboodi (yellow card) 66' (yellow-red card)	report	Karimi 86'; Sadeghi (yellow card) 52' (yellow-red card)	Stadium: Takhti Stadium; Attendance: 5,000; Referee: Mohammad Hossein Assadi

13 January 2013 21	Saba Qom	0–0	Persepolis	Qom
15:15 UTC+03:30		report		Stadium: Yadegar Emam Stadium; Attendance: 10,000; Referee: Alireza Faghani

18 January 2013 22	Fajr Sepasi	1–1	Saba Qom	Shiraz
15:30 UTC+03:30	Ansari 35'	report	Momeni 27'	Stadium: Hafezieh Stadium; Attendance: 3,000; Referee: Mohammadreza Akbarian

24 January 2013 23	Saba Qom	3–2	Sanat Naft	Qom
15:30 UTC+03:30	Razaghirad 25', 47', 56'	report	Daghagheleh 61'; Khaleghifar 84'	Stadium: Yadegar Emam Stadium; Attendance: 1,000; Referee: Ahmad Salehi

29 January 2013 24	Saba Qom	0–0	Tractor Sazi	Qom
15:30 UTC+03:30		report		Stadium: Yadegar Emam Stadium; Attendance: 4,000; Referee: Mohsen Ghahremani

3 February 2013 25	Gahar Zagros	1–1	Saba Qom	Dorood
15:00 UTC+03:30	Khorsandnia 87' (pen.)	report	Shafiei 32' (o.g.)	Stadium: Dorood Stadium; Attendance: 1,000; Referee: Saeid Mozaffarizadeh

19 February 2013 26	Saba Qom	1–2	Naft Tehran	Qom
15:30 UTC+03:30	Momeni 75'	report	Yousefi 21'; Alenemeh 37'	Stadium: Yadegar Emam Stadium; Attendance: 1,000; Referee: Mohammad Hossein Assadi

23 February 2013 27	Damash Gilan	1–1	Saba Qom	Rasht
16:00 UTC+03:30	Hallafi 74'	report	Momeni 64'	Stadium: Shahid Azodi Stadium; Attendance: NC; Referee: Javad Sharafi

4 March 2013 28	Saba Qom	1–1	Esteghlal	Qom
17:25 UTC+03:30	Razaghirad 29'; Bakhtiarizadeh (yellow card) 90+1' (yellow-red card)	report	Borhani 90+2' (pen.)	Stadium: Yadegar Emam Stadium; Attendance: 10,000; Referee: Yadollah Jahanbazi

8 March 2013 29	Sepahan	2–0	Saba Qom	Isfahan
16:00 UTC+03:30	Jahan Alian 24'; Sukaj 72'	report		Stadium: Foolad Shahr Stadium; Attendance: 3,000; Referee: Seyed Hossein Zargar

17 March 2013 30	Saba Qom	2–1	Aluminmium	Qom
17:00 UTC+03:30	Sadeghi 56' (pen.); Eslami 67'; Lotfi (red card) 56'; Momeni (yellow card) 70' (yellow-red card)	report	Meydavoudi 25'	Stadium: Yadegar Emam Stadium; Attendance: 1,000; Referee: Reza Kermanshahi

5 April 2013 31	Foolad	2–2	Saba Qom	Ahvaz
17:00 UTC+04:30	Nouri 45+1'; Nouri 62' (pen.)	report	Karimi 25'; Eslami 53'	Stadium: Ghadir Stadium; Attendance: 2,000; Referee: Alireza Faghani

12 April 2013 32	Saba Qom	2–1	Saipa	Qom
17:30 UTC+04:30	Karimi 31'; Momeni 90+2'	report	Rezaei 78'	Stadium: Yadegar Emam Stadium; Attendance: 1,000; Referee: Rasoul Rahbarfam

5 May 2013 33	Rah Ahan	1–1	Saba Qom	Tehran
18:00 UTC+04:30	Abbasfard 29'; Noormohammadi (red card) 80'	report	Soleiman Fallah 90+4'	Stadium: Rah Ahan Stadium; Attendance: 1,000; Referee: Pirouz Seyfollah Pour

10 May 2013 34	Saba Qom	0–1	Mes Kerman	Qom
18:00 UTC+04:30		report	Enayati 75'	Stadium: Yadegar Emam Stadium; Attendance: 1,000; Referee: Mohammadreza Faghani

=== AFC Champions League ===
==== Qualifying play-off ====
Win Draw Loss Postponed

February 10, 2012 Play-off	Saba Qom (Iran)	1–1 (3–5 p)	(United Arab Emirates) Al-Shabab Al-Arabi	Qom, Iran
17:00 UTC+03:30	Razaghirad 4'	report	Dhahi 89'	Stadium: Yadegar-e Emam Stadium; Attendance: 6,552; Referee: Abdul Malik Abdul Bashir (Singapore)
	Penalties
	Bakhtiarizadeh (penalty scored); Eslami (penalty missed); Fallah (penalty scored); Rezaian (penalty scored)		(penalty scored) Edgar; (penalty scored) Ibrahim; (penalty scored) Ciel; (penalty scored) Masood; (penalty scored) Marzooq

=== Hazfi Cup ===
==== Matches ====
Win Draw Loss Postponed

14 December 2012 1/16	Saba	3–0	Naft Masjed Soleyman	Qom, Iran
14:15 UTC+03:30				Stadium: Yadegar-e Emam Stadium; Referee: None
Note: Naft Masjed Soleyman withdrew

21 December 2012 1/8	Aboomoslem	2–1 (a.e.t.)	Saba	Mashhad
13:30 UTC+03:30	Hamidi 101'; Wirikom 117' (o.g.)	report 1 report 2	Haghjou 115'; Heidari (red card) 119'	Stadium: Samen Stadium; Attendance: 10,000; Referee: Ahmad Salehi
Note: The original match was scheduled to take place on 20 December but was postponed to 21 December due to heavy rain

== Friendly Matches ==
Win Draw Loss

July 3, 2012	Persepolis	0–2	Saba Qom	Tehran
18:00		Match Summary	Karimi 27'; Soleiman Fallah 55'	Stadium: Derafshifar Stadium; Attendance: 150

September 6, 2012	Saba Qom	0–1	Malavan	Tehran
17:30		Match Summary; Match Summary 2	Shirzad 90'	Stadium: Homa Stadium

== Statistics ==
=== Squad, appearances and goals ===
As of 16 June 2013

No.	Pos	Nat	Player	Total		Iran Pro League		Hazfi Cup		AFC Champions League	
No.	Pos	Nat	Player	Apps	Goals	Apps	Goals	Apps	Goals	Apps	Goals
Goalkeepers
1	GK	(Iran) IRI	Hamed Lak	23	0	23	0	0	0	0	0
21	GK	(Iran) IRI	Alireza Ghadiri	0	0	0	0	0	0	0	0
22	GK	(Iran) IRI	Mehrdad Tahmasbi	12	0	11	0	0	0	1	0
40	GK	(Iran) IRI	Mohammad Reza Vafaei	0	0	0	0	0	0	0	0
Defenders
2	DF	(Iran) IRI	Morteza Kashi	24	0	23	0	0	0	1	0
3	DF	(Iran) IRI	Mojtaba Mobini Pour	16	0	16	0	0	0	0	0
4	DF	(Iran) IRI	Masoud Haghjou	21	1	20	0	1	1	0	0
5	DF	(Iran) IRI	Sohrab Bakhtiarizadeh	10	0	9	0	0	0	1	0
11	DF	(Iran) IRI	Majid Houtan	16	0	16	0	0	0	0	0
13	DF	(Iran) IRI	Mohammad Aram Tab	2	0	2	0	0	0	0	0
14	DF	(Iran) IRI	Saeid Lotfi	27	0	25	0	1	0	1	0
15	DF	(Iran) IRI	Meysam Khosravi	4	0	4	0	0	0	0	0
20	DF	(Iran) IRI	Majid Heidari	19	0	18	0	1	0	0	0
26	DF	(Iran) IRI	Saeed Sadeghi	3	0	3	0	0	0	0	0
27	DF	(Iran) IRI	Ramin Rezaian	32	5	31	5	0	0	1	0
29	DF	(Iran) IRI	Davoud Bahadori	0	0	0	0	0	0	0	0
31	DF	(Iran) IRI	Rasoul Bakhtiarizadeh	0	0	0	0	0	0	0	0
Midfielders
6	MF	(Iran) IRI	Mehdi Badrlou	17	0	17	0	0	0	0	0
7	MF	(Iran) IRI	Akbar Sadeghi	27	2	26	2	0	0	1	0
8	MF	(Iran) IRI	Mohsen Bayat	12	1	11	1	1	0	0	0
9	MF	(Iran) IRI	Milad Nouri	34	6	32	6	1	0	1	0
12	MF	(Cameroon) CMR	David Tahnya Wirikom	28	1	26	1	1	0	1	0
17	MF	(Iran) IRI	Abdolfazl Ebrahimi	29	0	28	0	0	0	1	0
23	MF	(Iran) IRI	Mohammad Arab	0	0	0	0	0	0	0	0
33	MF	(Iran) IRI	Hossein Maleki	0	0	0	0	0	0	0	0
Forwards
10	FW	(Iran) IRI	Mohsen Khalili	3	0	3	0	0	0	0	0
16	FW	(Iran) IRI	Farid Karimi	27	7	26	7	1	0	0	0
18	FW	(Iran) IRI	Karim Eslami	18	1	17	1	0	0	1	0
19	FW	(Iran) IRI	Bahman Tahmasbi	19	0	19	0	0	0	0	0
24	FW	(Iran) IRI	Iman Razaghirad	17	6	16	5	0	0	1	1
25	FW	(Iran) IRI	Milad Soleiman Fallah	26	4	25	4	0	0	1	0
30	FW	(Iran) IRI	Mehdi Momeni	30	5	29	5	0	0	1	0

=== Goals conceded ===
- Updated on 21 May 2011

Ran	No.	Pos	Nat	Name	Pro League	Champions League	Hazfi Cup	Total	Minutes per goal
1		GK	(Iran)	Hamed Lak	23	0	0	1	90 min
22		GK	(Iran)	Mehrdad Tahmasbi	10	1	0	11	98.18182 min
TOTALS					33	1	2	36	90 min

== See also ==
- 2012–13 Persian Gulf Cup
- 2012–13 Hazfi Cup
- 2013 AFC Champions League
