= List of Iranian football transfers summer 2016 =

This is a list of Iranian football transfers for the 2016 summer transfer window. Transfers of the Persian Gulf Pro League and Azadegan League are listed.

== Players limits ==
The Iranian Football Clubs who participate in 2015–16 Iranian football different levels are allowed to have up to maximum 35 players in their player lists, which will be categorized in the following groups:

- Up to maximum 18 adult (without any age limit) players
- Up to maximum 9 under-23 players (i.e. the player whose birth is after 1 January 1994).
- Up to maximum 8 under-21 players (i.e. the player whose birth is after 1 January 1996).

== Persian Gulf Pro League ==
=== Rules and regulations ===
According to Iran Football Federation rules for the 2016–17 Persian Gulf Pro League, each Football Club is allowed to take up to a maximum of 6 new Iranian players from the other clubs who already played in the 2015–16 Iran Pro League season. In addition to these six new players, each club is allowed to take up to a maximum of 4 non-Iranian new players (at least one of them should be Asian) and up to 3 players from Free agents (who did not play in 2015–16 Iran Pro League season or doesn't list in any 2015–16 League after season's start) during the season. In addition to these players, the clubs are also able to take some new under-23 and under-21 years old players, if they have some free place in these categories in their player lists. Under-23 players should sign in the transfer window, but under-21 can be signed during the first mid-season.

=== Esteghlal ===
Head coach: (Iran) Alireza Mansourian
Remaining Pro League quota: 0

In: Note: Flags indicate national team as defined under FIFA eligibility rules; some limited exceptions apply. Players may hold more than one non-FIFA nationality.

No.	Pos.	Nation	Player
22	GK	IRN	Hossein Hosseini (from Malavan – conscription return)
23	DF	IRN	Majid Hosseini^{U21} (previously on loan at Rah Ahan)
7	MF	IRN	Bakhtiar Rahmani^{PL} (from Tractor Sazi)
14	MF	IRN	Farshid Bagheri^{PL} (from Saba Qom)
21	DF	IRN	Vouria Ghafouri^{PL} (from Sepahan)
17	FW	IRN	Ali Ghorbani^{PL} (from Naft Tehran)
19	DF	IRN	Milad Zakipour^{U23} (from Naft Tehran)
5	DF	IRN	Hossein Kanaanizadegan^{U23} (from Persepolis)
12	GK	IRN	Arshia Babazadeh^{U23} (from (United States) De Anza Force)
13	MF	IRN	Mi'ad Yazdani (from Sepidrood Rasht)
30	MF	IRN	Alireza Sayyar^{U23} (from Gol Gohar)
25	DF	IRN	Azim Goog^{U21} (from Esteghlal U21)
9	FW	IRN	Kaveh Rezaei^{PL} (from Zob Ahan)
16	FW	IRN	Arash Afshin (Free Agent)
3	DF	BRA	Róbson^{U23} (on loan from (Brazil) Bahia)
74	MF	IRN	Mojtaba Haghdoost^{U21} (on loan from Naft Tehran)
90	DF	BRA	Padovani^{PL} (from Sepahan)

Out: Note: Flags indicate national team as defined under FIFA eligibility rules; some limited exceptions apply. Players may hold more than one non-FIFA nationality.

No.	Pos.	Nation	Player
3	MF	IRN	Mohammad Reza Khorsandnia (to Padideh)
5	DF	IRN	Hanif Omranzadeh (to Khoneh Be Khoneh)
9	FW	IRN	Arash Borhani (to Paykan)
10	FW	IRN	Sajjad Shahbazzadeh (to (Turkey) Alanyaspor)
14	FW	CRO	Pero Pejić (to (Albania) Kukësi)
16	FW	IRN	Mehdi Momeni (to Esteghlal Khuzestan)
17	MF	IRN	Milad Shabanloo (to Sanat Naft)
19	MF	IRN	Alireza Ramezani (to Tractor Sazi)
22	GK	IRN	Vahid Talebloo (to Foolad)
33	GK	IRN	Amir Hossein Najafi (Released)
34	DF	IRN	Milad Fakhreddini (to Naft Tehran)
99	MF	MAR	Adil Chihi (to (Germany) FSV Frankfurt)
26	FW	IRN	Iman Abbaszadeh (to Nassaji)
—	MF	IRN	Erfan Badi (to Saba Qom)

=== Esteghlal Khuzestan ===
Head coach: (Iran) Sirous Pourmousavi
Remaining Pro League quota: 4

In: Note: Flags indicate national team as defined under FIFA eligibility rules; some limited exceptions apply. Players may hold more than one non-FIFA nationality.

No.	Pos.	Nation	Player
—	MF	IRN	Hossein Bahrami^{U23} (from Esteghlal Ahvaz)
—	DF	IRN	Ezzatollah Pourghaz^{PL} (from Malavan)
—	DF	IRN	Abolfazl Alaei^{U23} (from Foolad Yazd)
—	DF	IRN	Hossein Baziari^{U23} (from Iranjavan)
—	MF	IRN	Salman Bahrani (from Iranjavan)
—	FW	IRN	Mehdi Momeni^{PL} (from Esteghlal)
—	MF	IRN	Mohammad Sharifi^{U21} (Free agent)
—	MF	IRN	Sajjad Balegh^{U23} (from Esteghlal Ahvaz)
—	GK	BRA	Rafael Roballo (from (Brazil) Novo Hamburgo)
—	MF	BRA	Deyvid Sacconi (from (South Korea) Daegu FC)
—	FW	BRA	Caion (from (Brazil) AC Goianiense)

Out: Note: Flags indicate national team as defined under FIFA eligibility rules; some limited exceptions apply. Players may hold more than one non-FIFA nationality.

No.	Pos.	Nation	Player
1	GK	BRA	Fernando de Jesus (to Gostaresh Foulad)
5	DF	MLI	Moussa Coulibaly (to Sepahan)
7	MF	IRN	Hadi Khanifar (Released)
8	FW	IRN	Hakim Nassari (to Sanat Naft)
12	MF	TLS	Fellipe Bertoldo (Released)
14	DF	BRA	Eduardo Ferreira (End of Contract)
17	FW	IRN	Rouhollah Seifollahi (to FC Mashhad)
27	MF	IRN	Hamdollah Ebdam (Released)
70	MF	IRN	Omid Sing (Released)

=== Foolad ===
Head coach: (Iran) Naeim Saadavi
Remaining Pro League quota: 2

In: Note: Flags indicate national team as defined under FIFA eligibility rules; some limited exceptions apply. Players may hold more than one non-FIFA nationality.

No.	Pos.	Nation	Player
—	MF	IRN	Milad Pakparvar^{U23} (previously on loan at Esteghlal Ahvaz)
—	GK	IRN	Ehsan Moradian^{U23}^{PL} (from Esteghlal Ahvaz)
17	MF	IRN	Sasan Ansari^{PL} (from Persepolis)
—	MF	IRN	Hamid Bou Hamdan^{PL} (from Naft Tehran)
—	DF	IRN	Abdollah Karami^{PL} (from Sepahan)
—	GK	IRN	Vahid Talebloo^{PL} (from Esteghlal)
—	FW	IRN	Bahram Rashidi Farrokhi (from Mes Rafsanjan)

Out: Note: Flags indicate national team as defined under FIFA eligibility rules; some limited exceptions apply. Players may hold more than one non-FIFA nationality.

No.	Pos.	Nation	Player
1	GK	IRN	Alireza Salimi (to Rah Ahan)
3	DF	CRO	Leonard Mesarić (End of Contract)
5	MF	IRN	Mehdi Badrlou (to Saipa)
6	DF	IRN	Bahman Kamel (to Machine Sazi)
8	MF	IRN	Sasan Ansari (to Persepolis)
14	FW	CMR	Dorge Kouemaha (End of Contract)
16	DF	IRN	Aref Aghasi (to Tractor Sazi)
21	DF	IRN	Omid Khaledi (to Saipa)
28	MF	IRN	Amin Jahan Kohan (End of Contract)
70	DF	IRN	Mohammadreza Khanzadeh (to FC Mashhad)
88	MF	IRN	Amir Hossein Feshangchi (to Khoneh Be Khoneh)

=== FC Mashhad ===
Head coach: (Iran) Farhad Kazemi
Remaining Pro League quota: 0

In: Note: Flags indicate national team as defined under FIFA eligibility rules; some limited exceptions apply. Players may hold more than one non-FIFA nationality.

No.	Pos.	Nation	Player
—	MF	IRN	Saeid Moradi^{U23} (on loan from Tractor Sazi, previously at Parseh Tehran)
—	DF	IRN	Mohammadreza Khanzadeh (from Foolad)
—	DF	IRN	Ebrahim Karimi^{PL} (from Rah Ahan)
—	FW	IRN	Reza Darvishi^{PL} (from Malavan)
—	FW	IRN	Vahid Najafi^{U23} (from Sepahan)
—	FW	IRN	Abbas Asgari (from Niroo Zamini)
—	MF	IRN	Farshad Hashemi^{U23} (from Saipa B)
—	DF	IRN	Abbas Kazemian (from Mes Kerman)
—	MF	IRN	Milad Shokrzadeh^{U23} (from Esteghlal U23)
—	MF	IRN	Amir Hossein Hatmloo (from Kimia Farayand)
—	FW	IRN	Amir Hossein Moosazadeh (from Parseh Tehran)
—	FW	IRN	Rouhollah Seifollahi^{PL} (from Esteghlal Khuzestan)
—	FW	IRN	Amin Shojaeian (from Nassaji Mazandaran)
—	GK	IRN	Morteza Ghadimipour^{U23} (from Persepolis)
—	MF	IRN	Ayoub Kalantari^{PL} (from Tractor Sazi)
—	FW	IRN	Morteza Ranjbar (from Parseh Tehran)
—	MF	IRN	Asghar Jafari (from ........)
—	MF	IRN	Hossein Badamaki^{PL} (from Padideh)
—	GK	BRA	Andrey Nazário (from (Brazil) Cruzeiro-RS)
—	MF	CIV	Moussa Traore (from (Belgium) WS Bruxelles)
—	DF	IRN	Alireza Nourmohammadi^{PL} (from Persepolis)

Out: Note: Flags indicate national team as defined under FIFA eligibility rules; some limited exceptions apply. Players may hold more than one non-FIFA nationality.

No.	Pos.	Nation	Player
4	MF	IRN	Salar Afrasiabi (Released)
8	MF	IRN	Saeed Vasei (Released)
10	FW	IRN	Reza Enayati (to Saba Qom)
12	MF	IRN	Milad Safaei (Released)
16	MF	IRN	Alireza Naghizadeh (loan return to Gostaresh Foulad)
19	DF	IRN	Mehdi Jafarpour (Released)
20	DF	IRN	Mostafa Ahmadi (Released)
22	GK	IRN	Mohammad Hossein Eyn Asfhar (Released)
24	DF	ENG	Korede Aiyegbusi (Released)
27	FW	IRN	Hossein Zamehran (to Padideh)
35	MF	IRN	Hossein Karimi (to Khoneh Be Khoneh)
36	FW	IRN	Iman Mousavi (Released)
40	DF	IRN	Behrouz Afshar (to Baadraan Tehran)
65	MF	IRN	Milad Nouri (Released)
66	MF	IRN	Pedram Esmaeilian (Mutual consent)
77	FW	IRN	Mehdi Menarizadeh (Released)
90	DF	SWE	Kyle Konwea (Released)
99	FW	GAM	Alagie Sosseh (Released)

=== Gostaresh Foulad ===
Head coach: (Iran) Faraz Kamalvand
Remaining Pro League quota: 0

In: Note: Flags indicate national team as defined under FIFA eligibility rules; some limited exceptions apply. Players may hold more than one non-FIFA nationality.

No.	Pos.	Nation	Player
—	MF	IRN	Amir Hossein Karimi^{U21} (from Sepahan, previously on loan)
—	MF	IRN	Alireza Naghizadeh (previously on loan at FC Mashhad)
—	FW	IRN	Yousef Seyedi^{U21} (previously on loan at Machine Sazi)
—	GK	BRA	Fernando de Jesus^{PL} (from Esteghlal Khuzestan)
—	DF	IRN	Mohammad Moghanlou^{U23} (from Persepolis U21)
—	FW	IRN	Mohammad Reza Khalatbari^{PL} (from Sepahan)
—	MF	IRN	Alireza Cheraghali^{U21} (from Naft Tehran)
—	FW	IRN	Masoud Ebrahimzadeh^{PL} (from Saipa)
—	FW	IRN	Mehran Farziyat (from Niroo Zamini)
—	GK	IRN	Kourosh Maleki (from Mes Kerman)
—	DF	IRN	Ali Malaei^{U21} (from Tohid Tehran)
—	DF	IRN	Babak Hatami^{PL} (from Persepolis)
—	FW	BRA	Luciano Chimba^{PL} (from Sepahan)
—	FW	IRN	Reza Khaleghifar^{PL} (from Persepolis)

Out: Note: Flags indicate national team as defined under FIFA eligibility rules; some limited exceptions apply. Players may hold more than one non-FIFA nationality.

No.	Pos.	Nation	Player
1	GK	IRN	Davoud Noushi Soufiani (End of Contract)
2	DF	IRN	Omid Nezamipour (to Khoneh Be Khoneh)
4	MF	BRA	Leonardo Pimenta (End of Contract)
10	FW	IRN	Mohammad Ebrahimi (to Tractor Sazi)
11	FW	IRN	Shahram Goudarzi (to Tractor Sazi)
22	GK	BUL	Georgi Georgiev (to (Bulgaria) Botev Plovdiv)
26	DF	IRN	Mehdi Karbalaei (Mutual consent)
31	FW	IRN	Shahin Taherkhani (Mutual consent)
32	MF	IRN	Meysam Sadeghi (Mutual consent)
33	GK	IRN	Reza Jabbarnejad (Mutual consent)
34	MF	IRN	Saeed Sadeghi (Mutual consent)
70	DF	IRN	Ali Reza Latifi (to Malavan)
77	DF	IRN	Mostafa Ekrami (End of Contract)
80	FW	IRN	Saman Nariman Jahan (to Machine Sazi)
99	MF	IRN	Amir Hossein Karimi (loan return to Sepahan)

=== Machine Sazi ===
Head coach: (Iran) Rasoul Khatibi
Remaining Pro League quota: 0

In: Note: Flags indicate national team as defined under FIFA eligibility rules; some limited exceptions apply. Players may hold more than one non-FIFA nationality.

No.	Pos.	Nation	Player
—	FW	IRN	Jalal Rafkhaei^{PL} (from Malavan)
—	DF	IRN	Bahman Kamel^{PL} (from Foolad)
—	DF	IRN	Mohammad Nosrati^{PL} (from Gostaresh Foulad)
—	DF	IRN	Habib Gordani^{PL} (from Sepahan)
—	MF	IRN	Payam Sadeghian^{PL} (from Saba Qom)
—	MF	IRN	Ahmad Amir Kamdar^{PL} (from Zob Ahan)
—	MF	IRN	Andranik Teymourian^{PL} (from Saipa)
—	MF	SYR	Thaer Krouma (from (Iraq) Al-Talaba)
—	FW	IRN	Saeid Daghighi (from Mes Kerman)
—	FW	IRN	Ali Mikaeili^{U23} (from Shahin Kish)
—	FW	IRN	Ali Jeddi^{U21} (from Tractor Sazi U21)
—	MF	IRN	Sohrab Adib^{U23} (from Niroo Zamini)
—	MF	IRN	Sajjad Khatibi^{U23} (from Shahin Kish)
—	MF	IRN	Saeid Mehri^{U21} (from Shahrdari Tabriz)
—	MF	IRN	Ramin Ghorbani (from Naft Masjed Soleyman)
—	FW	IRN	Alireza Arjmandian^{U21} (from Moghavemat Tehran)
—	MF	GEO	Kakhaber Kakashvili^{U23} (from (Georgia (country)) Chikhura Sachkhere)
—	FW	IRN	Saman Nariman Jahan^{PL} (from Gostaresh Foulad)
—	FW	IRN	Mehran Ghorbanpour^{U23} (from Tractor Sazi)
—	DF	IRN	Peyman Keshavarz^{U21} (from Tractor Sazi)
—	GK	ESP	Manu (from (Spain) Deportivo La Coruña)
—	DF	BRA	Edson (from (Croatia) Slaven Belupo)

Out: Note: Flags indicate national team as defined under FIFA eligibility rules; some limited exceptions apply. Players may hold more than one non-FIFA nationality.

No.	Pos.	Nation	Player
21	FW	IRN	Mohsen Delir (to Mes Kerman)
90	FW	IRN	Yousef Seyedi (loan return to Gostaresh Foulad)
—	DF	IRN	Ali Jarrahkar (Termination of Contract)
—	FW	IRN	Reza Etemadi (to Malavan)

=== Naft Tehran ===
Head coach: (Iran) Ali Daei
Remaining Pro League quota: 1

In: Note: Flags indicate national team as defined under FIFA eligibility rules; some limited exceptions apply. Players may hold more than one non-FIFA nationality.

No.	Pos.	Nation	Player
—	MF	IRN	Akbar Sadeghi^{PL} (from Saba Qom)
—	DF	IRN	Ahmad Alenemeh^{PL} (from Padideh)
—	DF	IRN	Milad Fakhreddini^{PL} (from Esteghlal)
—	FW	IRN	Mohammad Ghazi^{PL} (from Saba Qom)
—	DF	IRN	Arash Shahamati^{U21} (from (Malaysia) Frenz United)
—	MF	IRN	Hamid Khodabandelou (from Damash Gilan)
—	DF	IRN	Hossein Jafari^{U23} (from Saipa U23)
—	GK	IRN	Nader Safarzaei^{U23} (Free agent)
—	MF	IRN	Milad Souri^{U23} (from Saipa U23)
—	MF	IRN	Tohid Gholami (from Niroo Zamini)
—	GK	IRN	Milad Farahani^{PL} (from Saba Qom)
—	FW	IRN	Mahan Baghdadi^{U23} (Free agent)
—	DF	CRO	Igor Prahić (Free agent)
—	MF	IRN	Reza Asadi^{U23} (from Sepahan)

Out: Note: Flags indicate national team as defined under FIFA eligibility rules; some limited exceptions apply. Players may hold more than one non-FIFA nationality.

No.	Pos.	Nation	Player
1	GK	IRN	Alireza Beiranvand (to Persepolis)
2	DF	IRN	Mehdi Shiri (to Paykan)
4	DF	IRN	Jalal Hosseini (to Persepolis)
5	DF	IRN	Siamak Kouroshi (to Saipa)
8	MF	IRN	Hamid Bou Hamdan (to Foolad)
10	FW	IRN	Vahid Amiri (to Persepolis)
14	DF	IRN	Saeid Lotfi (to Saipa)
42	DF	IRN	Milad Zakipour (to Esteghlal)
76	FW	IRN	Ali Ghorbani (to Esteghlal)
—	MF	IRN	Alireza Cheraghali (to Gostaresh Foulad)

=== Padideh ===
Head coach: (Iran) Mohammad Reza Mohajeri
Remaining Pro League quota: 0

In: Note: Flags indicate national team as defined under FIFA eligibility rules; some limited exceptions apply. Players may hold more than one non-FIFA nationality.

No.	Pos.	Nation	Player
—	DF	IRN	Morteza Mansouri^{U23} (from Khoneh Be Khoneh)
—	FW	IRN	Hamzeh Khaziravi^{U23}^{PL} (from Esteghlal Ahvaz)
—	FW	IRN	Hossein Zamehran^{PL} (from FC Mashhad)
—	DF	IRN	Abdollah Hosseini (from Mes Kerman)
—	DF	ARM	Varazdat Haroyan (from (Armenia) Pyunik)
—	GK	IRN	Shahab Gordan^{PL} (from Sepahan)
—	MF	IRN	Milad Kamandani^{U23}^{PL} (from Persepolis)
—	MF	IRN	Mehrdad Kafshgari^{PL} (from Persepolis)
—	MF	CIV	Drissa Diarrassouba (from (Armenia) Shirak)
—	MF	IRN	Mohammad Reza Khorsandnia^{PL} (from Esteghlal)

Out: Note: Flags indicate national team as defined under FIFA eligibility rules; some limited exceptions apply. Players may hold more than one non-FIFA nationality.

No.	Pos.	Nation	Player
5	DF	IRN	Mahmoud Khamisi (to Pars Jam Bushehr)
8	MF	IRN	Hossein Badamaki (to FC Mashhad)
9	DF	IRN	Ahmad Alenemeh (to Naft Tehran)
14	MF	IRN	Mehdi Kheiri (to Khoneh Be Khoneh)
18	MF	IRN	Meysam Naghizadeh (to Khoneh Be Khoneh)
22	GK	IRN	Alireza Heidari (to Malavan)
63	MF	IRN	Mohsen Bayat (End of Contract)
88	FW	IRN	Mehrdad Rezaei (to Baadraan Tehran)

=== Paykan ===
Head coach: (Iran) Majid Jalali
Remaining Pro League quota: 0

In: Note: Flags indicate national team as defined under FIFA eligibility rules; some limited exceptions apply. Players may hold more than one non-FIFA nationality.

No.	Pos.	Nation	Player
—	DF	IRN	Ali Hamoudi^{PL} (from Sepahan, previously on loan at Tractor Sazi)
—	DF	IRN	Mehdi Shiri^{PL} (from Naft Tehran)
—	MF	IRN	Bahador Abdi^{PL} (from Rah Ahan)
—	FW	IRN	Arash Borhani^{PL} (from Esteghlal)
—	FW	IRN	Sajjad Ashouri (from Parseh Tehran)
—	FW	IRN	Peyman Ranjbari (from Shahrdari Ardabil)
—	DF	IRN	Amir Hossein Sadeghi^{PL} (from Saba Qom)
—	DF	ARM	Levon Hayrapetyan (from (Armenia) Pyunik)
—	MF	IRN	Abolfazl Ebrahimi^{PL} (from Saba Qom)
—	GK	IRN	Rahman Ahmadi^{PL} (from Sepahan)
—	MF	IRN	Saeid Hosseinpour^{U21} (Free agent)
—	MF	IRN	Mahan Rahmani^{U21} (from Saipa)
—	FW	NGA	Godwin Mensha (from (Malta) Mosta)

Out: Note: Flags indicate national team as defined under FIFA eligibility rules; some limited exceptions apply. Players may hold more than one non-FIFA nationality.

No.	Pos.	Nation	Player
13	FW	IRN	Mojtaba Shiri (to Baadraan Tehran)
23	DF	IRN	Ramtin Soleymanzadeh (to Khoneh Be Khoneh)
69	FW	IRN	Hossein Maleki (Released)
77	MF	IRN	Abbas Mohammadrezaei (to Khoneh Be Khoneh)
99	FW	IRN	Reza Norouzi (to Sanat Naft)

=== Persepolis ===
Head coach: (Croatia) Branko Ivanković
Remaining Pro League quota: 2

In: Note: Flags indicate national team as defined under FIFA eligibility rules; some limited exceptions apply. Players may hold more than one non-FIFA nationality.

No.	Pos.	Nation	Player
13	DF	IRN	Hossein Mahini (from Malavan – conscription return)
1	GK	IRN	Alireza Beiranvand^{PL} (from Naft Tehran)
4	DF	IRN	Jalal Hosseini^{PL} (from Naft Tehran)
37	FW	IRN	Ehsan Alvanzadeh^{U23} (from Naft Masjed Soleyman)
12	GK	IRN	Abolfazl Darvishvand^{U21} (from Rah Ahan)
18	MF	IRN	Mohsen Rabiekhah (from Sanat Naft)
19	MF	IRN	Vahid Amiri^{PL} (from Naft Tehran)
6	DF	AUS	Antony Golec (from (Moldova) Sheriff Tiraspol)
23	DF	IRN	Mohammad Aram Tab^{PL} (from Saba Qom)
5	DF	IRN	Hamed Aghaei^{U21} (from Shahrdari Ardabil)
17	MF	IRN	Sadegh Moharrami^{U21} (from Malavan)
22	DF	UKR	Oleksiy Polyanskyi (from (Ukraine) Shakhtar Donetsk)
80	FW	UKR	Volodymyr Pryyomov (from (Ukraine) Metalist Kharkiv)
44	GK	CRO	Božidar Radošević (from (Hungary) Debreceni)
28	FW	IRN	Reza Karamolachaab^{U21} (from (Portugal) Mafra)

Out: Note: Flags indicate national team as defined under FIFA eligibility rules; some limited exceptions apply. Players may hold more than one non-FIFA nationality.

No.	Pos.	Nation	Player
1	GK	IRN	Sosha Makani (to (Norway) Mjøndalen IF)
3	DF	IRN	Vahid Heydarieh (Released)
4	DF	CRC	Michael Umana (to (Costa Rica) Liberia)
6	DF	IRN	Mohsen Bengar (to Tractor Sazi)
12	GK	IRN	Morteza Ghadimipour (to FC Mashhad)
14	FW	HON	Jerry Bengtson (to Zob Ahan)
16	FW	IRN	Reza Khaleghifar (to Gostaresh Foulad)
17	FW	IRN	Ali Fatemi (to Saba Qom, previously on loan at Rah Ahan)
18	MF	IRN	Mehrdad Kafshgari (to Padideh)
19	MF	IRN	Milad Kamandani (to Padideh)
20	DF	IRN	Alireza Nourmohammadi (to FC Mashhad)
23	DF	CRO	Luka Marić (to (Romania) Dinamo București)
30	GK	IRN	Ali Mohsenzadeh (to Rah Ahan)
40	DF	IRN	Babak Hatami (to Gostaresh Foulad)
44	DF	IRN	Amir Abbas Ayenechi (End of Contract)
55	GK	UZB	Aleksandr Lobanov (to (Uzbekistan) Pakhtakor)
—	DF	IRN	Hossein Kanaanizadegan (to Esteghlal, previously on loan at Malavan)

=== Saba Qom ===
Head coach: (Iran) Samad Marfavi
Remaining Pro League quota: 1

In: Note: Flags indicate national team as defined under FIFA eligibility rules; some limited exceptions apply. Players may hold more than one non-FIFA nationality.

No.	Pos.	Nation	Player
—	FW	IRN	Ali Fatemi^{PL} (from Persepolis, previously on loan at Rah Ahan)
—	FW	IRN	Ahmad Hassanzadeh (from Fajr Sepasi – conscription return)
—	GK	IRN	Mohammad Bagher Sadeghi^{PL} (from Zob Ahan)
—	FW	IRN	Mansour Tanhaei (from Khoneh Be Khoneh)
—	MF	IRN	Ghasem Dehnavi (from Khoneh Be Khoneh)
—	DF	IRN	Mirhani Hashemi (from Khoneh Be Khoneh)
—	DF	IRN	Hamidreza Divsalar^{PL} (from Rah Ahan)
—	DF	IRN	Hashem Beikzadeh^{PL} (from Zob Ahan)
—	MF	IRN	Vahid Aliabadi (from PAS Hamedan)
—	FW	IRN	Reza Enayati^{PL} (from FC Mashhad)
—	FW	IRN	Keivan Amraei (from Mes Kerman)
—	MF	IRN	Mehran Amiri (from Giti Pasand)
—	DF	IRN	Pouria Seifpanahi (Free agent)
—	MF	IRN	Omid Jahanbakhshi (from .......)
—	MF	IRN	Ali Ebrahimi (from ........)
—	FW	IRN	Masood Kiomarsi (from Naft Masjed Soleyman)
—	DF	IRN	Hassan Karimi^{U21} (from Sepahan U23)

Out: Note: Flags indicate national team as defined under FIFA eligibility rules; some limited exceptions apply. Players may hold more than one non-FIFA nationality.

No.	Pos.	Nation	Player
6	DF	BRA	Filipe Machado (to (Brazil) Chapecoense)
7	MF	IRN	Abolfazl Ebrahimi (to Paykan)
8	DF	IRN	Amir Hossein Sadeghi (to Paykan)
10	FW	IRN	Farid Karimi (to Sepahan)
11	FW	IRN	Mohammad Ghazi (to Naft Tehran)
12	GK	IRN	Milad Farahani (to Naft Tehran)
13	DF	IRN	Mohammad Aram Tab (to Persepolis)
15	DF	IRN	Jahanbakhsh Zabihi Taher (Released)
16	DF	IRN	Omid Ghorbani (Released)
17	FW	IRN	Jalaleddin Alimohammadi (to Sepahan)
20	MF	IRN	Saman Aghazamani (Released)
21	MF	IRN	Farshid Bagheri (to Esteghlal)
27	FW	IRN	Saeid Ghomi (Released)
93	MF	IRN	Akbar Sadeghi (to Naft Tehran)
99	MF	IRN	Payam Sadeghian (to Machine Sazi)

=== Saipa ===
Head coach: (Iran) Hossein Faraki
Remaining Pro League quota: 1

In: Note: Flags indicate national team as defined under FIFA eligibility rules; some limited exceptions apply. Players may hold more than one non-FIFA nationality.

No.	Pos.	Nation	Player
—	FW	IRN	Amir Mohammad Mazloum^{U21} (from Malavan)
—	FW	IRN	Masoud Hassanzadeh^{PL} (from Zob Ahan)
—	DF	IRN	Siamak Kouroshi^{PL} (from Naft Tehran)
—	DF	IRN	Saeid Lotfi^{PL} (from Naft Tehran)
—	MF	IRN	Mehdi Badrlou^{PL} (from Foolad)
—	DF	IRN	Omid Khaledi^{PL} (from Foolad)
—	DF	BRA	Júnior Lopes (from (Brazil) Boa)
—	GK	BRA	Alessandro (from (Brazil) Aimoré)

Out: Note: Flags indicate national team as defined under FIFA eligibility rules; some limited exceptions apply. Players may hold more than one non-FIFA nationality.

No.	Pos.	Nation	Player
5	DF	IRN	Majid Ayoubi (to Mes Kerman)
10	FW	IRN	Milad Meydavoudi (End of Contract)
14	MF	IRN	Mahan Rahmani (to Paykan)
22	GK	BIH	Ratko Dujković (End of Contract)
24	MF	IRN	Andranik Teymourian (to Machine Sazi)
25	FW	IRN	Mehdi Daghagheleh (to Mes Kerman)
61	FW	IRN	Masoud Ebrahimzadeh (to Gostaresh Foulad)

=== Sanat Naft ===
Head coach: (Iran) Nader Dastneshan
Remaining Pro League quota: 5

In: Note: Flags indicate national team as defined under FIFA eligibility rules; some limited exceptions apply. Players may hold more than one non-FIFA nationality.

No.	Pos.	Nation	Player
—	FW	IRN	Hakim Nassari^{PL} (from Esteghlal Khuzestan)
—	DF	IRN	Hossein Saki^{U21} (from Esteghlal Ahvaz)
—	DF	IRN	Farshad Faraji^{U23}^{PL} (from Rah Ahan)
—	MF	IRN	Milad Shabanloo^{U23} (from Esteghlal)
—	GK	IRN	Agil Etemadi (from (Netherlands) Almere City)
—	MF	KOR	Kim Gwi-hyeon (from (Oman) Al-Nasr)
—	DF	NGA	Rasheed Alabi (from (Cyprus) Pafos)
—	FW	IRN	Reza Norouzi (from Paykan)
—	MF	IRN	Mostafa Ahmadi (from Iranjavan)
—	GK	IRN	Yaser Papi^{U21} (from Sanat Naft U21)
—	DF	IRN	Milad Dagheri^{U23} (from Sanat Naft U23)
—	MF	IRN	Hossein Jafari^{U23} (from Sanat Naft U23)
—	FW	IRN	Milad Mousavi^{U23} (from Sanat Naft U23)
—	MF	IRN	Hooman Omidi^{U21} (from Sanat Naft U21)
—	MF	IRN	Moslem Mojdemi^{U21} (from Sanat Naft U21)
—	GK	IRN	Mohammad Deris^{U23} (from Sanat Naft U23)
—	MF	IRN	Mahmoud Darizadeh^{U23} (from Sanat Naft U23)
—	MF	BRA	Bruno Oliveira de Matos (from (Serbia) Novi Pazar)

Out: Note: Flags indicate national team as defined under FIFA eligibility rules; some limited exceptions apply. Players may hold more than one non-FIFA nationality.

No.	Pos.	Nation	Player
10	MF	IRN	Mahmoud Tighnavard (to Baadraan Tehran)
13	MF	IRN	Mohsen Rabiekhah (to Persepolis)
22	GK	IRN	Ali Asakereh (Released)
25	DF	IRN	Vahid Faroogh (to Baadraan Tehran)

=== Sepahan ===
Head coach: (Iran) Abdollah Veisi
Remaining Pro League quota: 1

In: Note: Flags indicate national team as defined under FIFA eligibility rules; some limited exceptions apply. Players may hold more than one non-FIFA nationality.

No.	Pos.	Nation	Player
1	GK	BRA	Lee Oliveira (from (Portugal) Academica)
2	DF	IRN	Ali Helichi^{U23} (from Esteghlal Ahvaz)
3	DF	IRN	Shoja' Khalilzadeh (from Tractor Sazi - conscription return)
5	DF	MLI	Moussa Coulibaly^{PL} (from Esteghlal Khuzestan)
9	MF	IRN	Farid Karimi^{PL} (from Saba Qom)
10	MF	IRN	Taleb Reykani^{PL} (from Esteghlal Ahvaz)
11	FW	IRN	Emad Mirjavan (from Aluminium Arak)
12	MF	IRN	Reza Dehghani^{U21} (from Sepahan U21)
17	FW	IRN	Jalaleddin Alimohammadi^{PL} (from Saba Qom)
19	MF	IRN	Saber Didehvar^{U23} (from Sepahan U21)
20	FW	IRN	Masoud Kazemayni^{U21} (from Sepahan U21)
21	MF	IRN	Mahmoud Ghaed Rahmati (from Kheybar Khorramabad)
23	MF	IRN	Mehrdad Mohammadi^{PL} (from Rah Ahan)
28	DF	IRN	Ehsan Hajsafi (from (Germany) FSV Frankfurt)
99	FW	TLS	Pedro Oliveira (from (Thailand) Air Force Central)

Out: Note: Flags indicate national team as defined under FIFA eligibility rules; some limited exceptions apply. Players may hold more than one non-FIFA nationality.

No.	Pos.	Nation	Player
1	GK	IRN	Rahman Ahmadi (to Paykan)
2	DF	BRA	Padovani (to Esteghlal)
3	DF	IRN	Habib Gordani (to Machine Sazi)
5	DF	IRN	Hassan Karimi (to Saba Qom)
9	FW	IRN	Mohammad Reza Khalatbari (to Gostaresh Foulad)
10	DF	IRN	Abdollah Karami (to Foolad)
11	MF	IRN	Amin Jahan Alian (to Aluminium Arak)
12	MF	IRN	Ali Karimi (to (Croatia) Dinamo Zagreb)
14	FW	IRN	Vahid Najafi (to FC Mashhad)
15	DF	IRN	Ali Gholami (Released)
16	MF	IRN	Mohammad Papi (to Tractor Sazi – conscription)
17	MF	BIH	Senijad Ibričić (to (Slovenia) FC Koper)
18	MF	UZB	Fozil Musaev (to (Uzbekistan) FC Nasaf)
21	DF	IRN	Vouria Ghafouri (to Esteghlal)
29	FW	BRA	Luciano Chimba (to Gostaresh Foulad)
33	DF	IRN	Saeed Ghaedifar (to Machine Sazi)
35	GK	IRN	Shahab Gordan (to Padideh)
40	DF	IRN	Ali Hamoudi (to Paykan, previously on loan at Tractor Sazi)
47	DF	IRN	Hadi Aghili (Released)
66	DF	IRN	Mohammad Ali Ahmadi (Released)
68	MF	IRN	Reza Asadi (to Naft Tehran)
74	FW	IRN	Amin Manouchehri (to Baadraan Tehran)
80	MF	IRN	Ali Hazami (to Baadraan Tehran)
99	MF	IRN	Amir Hossein Karimi (to Gostaresh Foulad, previously on loan)

=== Tractor Sazi ===
Head coach: (Iran) Amir Ghalenoei
Remaining Pro League quota: 1

In: Note: Flags indicate national team as defined under FIFA eligibility rules; some limited exceptions apply. Players may hold more than one non-FIFA nationality.

No.	Pos.	Nation	Player
66	MF	IRN	Sina Ashouri (from Zob Ahan, previously on loan)
—	MF	IRN	Saeid Moradi^{U23} (from Parseh Tehran)
—	DF	IRN	Mohsen Bengar^{PL} (from Persepolis)
—	FW	IRN	Shahram Goudarzi^{PL} (from Gostaresh Foulad)
10	FW	IRN	Mohammad Ebrahimi^{PL} (from Gostaresh Foulad)
—	DF	IRN	Mohammad Naderi^{U23} (from Moghavemat Tehran)
—	DF	IRN	Mohammadreza Mehdizadeh^{U21} (from Shahre Baran)
—	GK	IRN	Mohammad Amin Bahrami^{U21} (from Zob Ahan)
—	MF	IRN	Soheil Salehi^{U21} (from Naft va Gaz Gachsaran)
—	MF	IRN	Ali Taheran^{U21} (from Tractor Sazi U19)
14	MF	IRN	Mohammad Nouri (from (Qatar) Al-Meisameer)
13	MF	IRQ	Karrar Jassim (from (Iraq) Naft Al-Wasat)
44	DF	IRN	Hadi Mohammadi^{PL} (from Zob Ahan)
—	MF	IRN	Alireza Ramezani^{PL} (from Esteghlal)
—	FW	BRA	Edinho (from (Qatar) Al-Sailiya)
—	DF	IRN	Aref Aghasi^{U21} (from Foolad)
—	MF	IRN	Mohammad Papi^{U21} (from Sepahan U23 – conscription)

Out: Note: Flags indicate national team as defined under FIFA eligibility rules; some limited exceptions apply. Players may hold more than one non-FIFA nationality.

No.	Pos.	Nation	Player
3	DF	IRN	Shoja' Khalilzadeh (to Sepahan – conscription return)
5	DF	BRA	Carlos Cardoso (End of Contract)
8	FW	IRN	Shahin Saghebi (to Malavan – conscription return)
11	MF	IRN	Bakhtiar Rahmani (to Esteghlal)
12	GK	IRN	Masoud Homami (End of Contract)
15	MF	IRN	Ayoub Kalantari (to FC Mashhad)
16	MF	IRN	Mohammad Pour Rahmatollah (to Malavan – conscription return)
18	MF	PHI	Iain Ramsay (to (Netherlands) NEC)
19	MF	BRA	Augusto César (loan return to (Brazil) Internacional)
27	FW	CMR	Aloys Nong (End of Contract)
34	FW	IRN	Mehran Ghorbanpour (to Machine Sazi)
40	DF	IRN	Ali Hamoudi (to Sepahan – conscription return)
44	DF	IRN	Peyman Keshavarz (to Machine Sazi)
88	MF	IRN	Fardin Abedini (End of Contract)
—	MF	IRN	Saeid Moradi (loan to FC Mashhad, previously at Parseh Tehran)

=== Zob Ahan ===
Head coach: (Iran) Yahya Golmohammadi
Remaining Pro League quota: 4

In: Note: Flags indicate national team as defined under FIFA eligibility rules; some limited exceptions apply. Players may hold more than one non-FIFA nationality.

No.	Pos.	Nation	Player
—	FW	IRN	Yaser Feyzi (from Oxin Alborz)
—	GK	IRN	Hamid Erfani (from Giti Pasand)
—	MF	IRN	Mohammad Sattari^{PL} (from Malavan)
—	FW	HON	Jerry Bengtson^{PL} (from Persepolis)

Out: Note: Flags indicate national team as defined under FIFA eligibility rules; some limited exceptions apply. Players may hold more than one non-FIFA nationality.

No.	Pos.	Nation	Player
1	GK	IRN	Mohammad Bagher Sadeghi (to Saba Qom)
3	DF	LBN	Walid Ismail (End of Contract)
4	DF	IRN	Hadi Mohammadi (to Tractor Sazi)
7	FW	IRN	Masoud Hassanzadeh (to Saipa)
9	FW	IRN	Kaveh Rezaei (to Esteghlal)
17	FW	BRA	Marco Aurélio Iubel (Mutual consent)
21	DF	IRN	Saeb Mohebi (to Rah Ahan)
33	GK	IRN	Mohammad Amin Bahrami (to Tractor Sazi)
61	DF	IRN	Hashem Beikzadeh (to Saba Qom)
77	MF	IRN	Ahmad Amir Kamdar (to Machine Sazi)
—	MF	IRN	Sina Ashouri (to Tractor Sazi, previously on loan)

Notes

- ^{PL} Pro League quota.

== Azadegan League ==
=== Rules and regulations ===
According to Iran Football Federation rules for 2016–17 Azadegan League each club is allowed to take up to 3 players from Free agent during the season. In addition to these players, the clubs are also able to take some new under-23 and under-21 years old players, if they have some free place in these categories in their player lists. Under-23 players should sign in transfer window but under-21 can be signed during the first mid-season. Clubs in Azadegan League Couldn't sign any foreign player. There is no limit for signing Iranian players.

=== Sepidrood ===
Head coach: (Iran) Ali Nazarmohammadi

In: Note: Flags indicate national team as defined under FIFA eligibility rules; some limited exceptions apply. Players may hold more than one non-FIFA nationality.

No.	Pos.	Nation	Player
—	DF	IRN	Hossein Kaebi (from Free agent)
—	DF	IRN	Hadi Tamini (from Free agent)
—	MF	IRN	Mohammad Rostami (from Damash Gilan)
—	MF	IRN	Mohammad Nozhati (from Shahrdari Ardebil)
—	MF	IRN	Mohammad Reza Mahdavi (from Damash Gilan)

Out: Note: Flags indicate national team as defined under FIFA eligibility rules; some limited exceptions apply. Players may hold more than one non-FIFA nationality.

No.	Pos.	Nation	Player
—	MF	IRN	Mi'ad Yazdani (to Esteghlal)

== 2nd Division ==
=== Damash Gilan ===
Head coach:

In: Note: Flags indicate national team as defined under FIFA eligibility rules; some limited exceptions apply. Players may hold more than one non-FIFA nationality.

No.	Pos.	Nation	Player
—	DF	IRN	Ali Nazifkar (from Khooneh Be Khooneh)
—	DF	IRN	Mohammad Mokhtari (from Mes Kerman)
—	MF	IRN	Saman Nourmohammadi (from Naft va Gaz Gachsaran F.C.)
—	FW	IRN	Farshad Esmaeilzadeh (from Sepidrood)
—	MF	IRN	Majid Hootan (from Kheybar Khorramabad)
—	DF	IRN	Ehsan Rasti (from Kara Shiraz)
—	DF	IRN	Kanan Tahernejad (from Rahpouyan Rezvanshahr)

Out: Note: Flags indicate national team as defined under FIFA eligibility rules; some limited exceptions apply. Players may hold more than one non-FIFA nationality.

No.	Pos.	Nation	Player
—	FW	IRN	Saeid Mortazavi (to Bargh)

== See also ==
- List of Iranian football transfers winter 2014–15
- List of Iranian football transfers summer 2015
- List of Iranian football transfers winter 2015–16
- List of Iranian football transfers winter 2016–17
