= 2013–14 Saba Qom F.C. season =

Saba Qom
2013–14 season
- Chairman: Mohammadreza Keshvari Fard
- Manager: Mohammad Mayeli Kohan
- Stadium: Yadegar Emam Stadium
- IPL: N/A
- Hazfi Cup: N/A
Home colours	Away colours

The 2013–14 season was the Saba Football Club's 10th season in the Iran Pro League and their 10th consecutive season in the top division of Iranian football. They also competed in the Hazfi Cup and it was their 12th year in existence as a football club.

== Club ==
=== Kit ===
Supplier: Majid

Home Kit	Away Kit

=== Coaching staff ===
Position	Staff
Head coach	(Iran) Mohammad Mayeli Kohan

=== Other information ===
Position	Staff
Chairman	(Iran) Mohammadreza Keshvari Fard
Media Officer	(Iran) Golamreza Maleki

Munition Team
(Iran) Aliakbar Sarlak

=== Grounds ===
Ground (capacity and dimensions)	Yadegar Emam Stadium (10,610 / )

== Competitions ==
=== Overall ===
Competition	Started round	Current position / round	Final position / round	First match	Last match
2013–14 Iran Pro League	—	—		July 2013	May 2014
2013–14 Hazfi Cup	Round of 32	—			

Updated to match played 17 June 2013
Source: Competitions
Note: Current Position/Round Only use for team still a part of Competition.

=== Iran Pro League ===
Note: Flags indicate national team as defined under FIFA eligibility rules; some limited exceptions apply. Players may hold more than one non-FIFA nationality.

No.	Pos.	Nation	Player
1	GK	IRN	Mehrdad Tahmasbi
2	DF	IRN	Morteza Kashi (Captain)
3	DF	IRN	Mojtaba Mobini Pour ^{U23}
4	DF	IRN	Masoud Haghjou
5	DF	IRN	Mehdi Mohammadi
7	MF	IRN	Akbar Sadeghi
8	MF	IRN	Mohsen Bayat
10	FW	IRN	Reza Enayati
11	DF	IRN	Majid Houtan
13	DF	IRN	Mohammad Aram Tab
14	DF	IRN	Saeid Lotfi ^{U23}
16	FW	IRN	Farid Karimi
17	MF	IRN	Abdolfazl Ebrahimi
20	DF	IRN	Majid Heidari
23	FW	IRN	Keivan Amraei
25	FW	IRN	Milad Soleiman Fallah

No.	Pos.	Nation	Player
26	DF	IRN	Mahmoud Shafiei
29	DF	IRN	Davoud Bahadori ^{U21}
30	FW	IRN	Mehdi Momeni
31	DF	IRN	Rasoul Bakhtiarizadeh ^{U21}
33	GK	IRN	Shahram Mehraban
—	MF	IRN	Mohammad Arab ^{U23}
—	MF	IRN	Hamed Pouromrani ^{U23}
—		IRN	Amir Mollajamali ^{U23}
—		IRN	Mehdi Hosseini ^{U21}
—	GK	IRN	Mohsen Ahmadi ^{U23}
—		IRN	Hadi Ali Zamani
—		IRN	Hamidreza Pakizeh ^{U23}
—	MF	IRN	Nima Zand ^{U23}
—	DF	IRN	Ali Goudarzi ^{U23}
—	DF	IRN	Roozbeh Cheshmi ^{U21}

==== Standings ====
Pos	Team	Pld	W	D	L	GF	GA	GD	Pts
7	Malavan	30	13	6	11	40	33	+7	44 (Note: Esteghlal, Malavan, Damash, Persepolis and Tractor Sazi were deducted 1 point due to poor fan behavior in their home matches.)
8	Saipa	30	7	14	9	26	31	−5	35
9	Saba Qom	30	8	9	13	32	38	−6	33
10	Gostaresh	30	7	11	12	31	34	−3	32
11	Rah Ahan	30	7	10	13	25	34	−9	31

Updated to match(es) played on 11 April 2014. Source: FIFA.com
Rules for classification: 1) points; 2) goal difference; 3) number of goals scored.

==== Results summary ====
Overall								Home						Away					
Pld	W	D	L	GF	GA	GD	Pts	W	D	L	GF	GA	GD	W	D	L	GF	GA	GD
3	2	0	1	3	2	+1	6	1	0	1	1	1	0	1	0	0	2	1	+1

Last updated: 17 June 2013.
Source: Ipl Stats

==== Results by round ====
Round	1	2	3	4	5	6	7	8	9	10	11	12	13	14	15	16	17	18	19	20	21	22	23	24	25	26	27	28	29	30
Ground	H	A	H	A	H	A	H	H	A	H	A	H	A	H	A	A	H	A	H	A	H	A	A	H	A	H	A	H	A	H
Result	W	W	L																											
Position	4	2	4																											

Updated to match(es) played on 17 June 2013. Source: "Ipl".
A = Away; H = Home; W = Win; D = Draw; L = Loss

==== Matches ====
Win Draw Loss Postponed

25 July 2013 1	Saba Qom	1–0	Malavan	Qom
22:00 UTC+04:30	Enayati 24' (pen.); Pouromrani (yellow card) 90+3'	report	Ashjari (yellow card) 13'; Samuel (red card) 23'	Stadium: Yadegar-e Emam Stadium; Attendance: 1,000; Referee: Ahmad Salehi

2 August 2013 2	Naft Tehran	1–2	Saba Qom	Tehran
22:00 UTC+04:30	Norouzi 25'	report	Enayati 38'; Karimi (yellow card) 53'	Stadium: Dastgerdi

6 August 2013 3	Saba Qom	0–1	Foolad	Qom
22:00 UTC+04:30		report	Karami 48'	Stadium: Yadegar-e Emam Stadium; Attendance: 300; Referee: Shahin Hajbabaei

16 August 2013 4	Esteghlal	1–0	Saba Qom	Tehran
				Stadium: Azadi Stadium; Attendance: 17,000

24 August 2013 5	Saba Qom	2–2	Gostaresh Foolad	Qom
				Stadium: Yadegar-e Emam Stadium; Attendance: 1,000

30 August 2013 6	Sepahan	2–1	Saba Qom	Isfahan
				Stadium: Fooladshahr Stadium; Attendance: 6,000

13 September 2013 7	Saba Qom	3–0	Fajr Sepasi	Qom
				Stadium: Yadegar-e Emam Stadium; Attendance: 1,000

20 September 2013 8	Saba Qom	1–3	Tractor Sazi	Qom
				Stadium: Yadegar-e Emam Stadium; Attendance: 5,000

27 September 2013 9	Damash Gilan	2–1	Saba Qom	Rasht
				Stadium: Dr. Azodi Stadium; Attendance: 4,000

2 October 2013 10	Saba Qom	v	Rah Ahan	Qom
				Stadium: Yadegar-e Emam Stadium

18 October 2013 11	Est. Khuzestan	v	Saba Qom	Ahvaz
				Stadium: Takhti Stadium

24 October 2013 12	Saba Qom	v	Persepolis	Qom
				Stadium: Yadegar-e Emam Stadium

6 November 2013 13	Zob Ahan	v	Saba Qom	Isfahan
				Stadium: Fooladshahr Stadium

22 November 2013 14	Saba Qom	v	Mes Kerman	Qom
				Stadium: Yadegar-e Emam Stadium

28 November 2013 15	Saipa	v	Saba Qom	Karaj
				Stadium: Enghelab Stadium

13 December 2013 16	Malavan	v	Saba Qom	Anzali
				Stadium: Takhti Stadium

20 December 2013 17	Saba Qom	v	Naft Tehran	Qom
				Stadium: Yadegar-e Emam Stadium

3 January 2014 18	Foolad	v	Saba Qom	Ahvaz
				Stadium: Ghadir Stadium

10 January 2014 19	Saba Qom	v	Esteghlal	Qom
				Stadium: Yadegar-e Emam Stadium

17 January 2014 20	Gostaresh Foolad	v	Saba Qom	Tabriz
				Stadium: Gostaresh Foolad Stadium

24 January 2014 21	Saba Qom	v	Sepahan	Qom
				Stadium: Yadegar-e Emam Stadium

30 January 2014 22	Fajr Sepasi	v	Saba Qom	Shiraz
				Stadium: Hafezieh Stadium

6 February 2014 23	Tractor Sazi	v	Saba Qom	Tabriz
				Stadium: Sahand Stadium

14 February 2014 24	Saba Qom	v	Damash Gilan	Qom
				Stadium: Yadegar-e Emam Stadium

21 February 2014 25	Rah Ahan	v	Saba Qom	Tehran
				Stadium: Takhti Stadium

7 March 2014 26	Saba Qom	v	Est. Khuzestan	Qom
				Stadium: Yadegar-e Emam Stadium

13 March 2014 27	Persepolis	v	Saba Qom	Tehran
				Stadium: Azadi Stadium

3 April 2014 28	Saba Qom	v	Zob Ahan	Qom
				Stadium: Yadegar-e Emam Stadium

11 April 2014 29	Mes Kerman	v	Saba Qom	Kerman
				Stadium: Shahid Bahonar Stadium

18 April 2014 30	Saba Qom	v	Saipa	Qom
				Stadium: Yadegar-e Emam Stadium

== See also ==
- 2013–14 Iran Pro League
- 2013–14 Hazfi Cup
