= Bahadori (surname) =

Bahadori is a surname. Notable people with the surname include:

- Benyamin Bahadori, Iranian musician
- Davoud Bahadori (born 1994), Iranian football player
- Ghodrat Bahadori (born 1990), Iranian futsal player and coach
- Hadi Bahadori (born 1978), Iranian politician
- Mehdi Bahadori (born 1933), Iranian academic and engineer
- Moslem Bahadori (1927–2022), Iranian medical scientist
- Mehran Bahadori (born 1989), Iranian football player
