= Yadegar-e Emam Stadium =

Yadegar-e Emam Stadium may refer to:

- Yadegar-e Emam Stadium (Tabriz)
- Yadegar-e Emam Stadium (Qom)
