= Behrouz Afshar =

Iranian footballer

Personal information
- Full name: Behrouz Afshar Foroughi
- Date of birth: March 14, 1986 (age 40)
- Place of birth: Mashhad, Iran
- Positions: Defender; defensive midfielder

Team information
- Current team: Siah Jamegan
- Number: 6

Youth career
- 1999–2011: Dehdari Mashhad
- 2001–2006: Aboumoslem

Senior career*
Years	Team	Apps	(Gls)
2006–2011	Gaz Sarakhs		
2011–2016	Siah Jamegan		
2016–2017	Baadraan Tehran		
2017–2018	Siah Jamegan		
2019	Baadraan Tehran F.C.		
2019-2020	Mes Rafsanjan F.C.		
2020-2022	Esteghlal Khuzestan F.C.		
2022-	Khooshe Talaei Saveh F.C.		
- * Club domestic league appearances and goals as of 31 October 2015

Behrouaz Afshar (Persian: بهروز افشار) is an Iranian football defender who plays for Baadraan Tehran in the Azadegan League.

== Club career ==
Former Aboumoslem Academy product joined Gaz Sarakhs in 2006 with 5 years contract. He moved to Siah Jamegan in summer 2011 after his contract expiration with Gaz Sarakhs. He made his professional debut for Siah Jamegan on August 7, 2015, against Esteghlal Ahvaz as a starter.

== Club career statistics ==
As of 31 October 2015.

Club	Division	Season	League		Hazfi Cup		Asia		Total	
Club	Division	Season	Apps	Goals	Apps	Goals	Apps	Goals	Apps	Goals
Siah; Jamegan	Division 1	2013–14	15	1	1	0	–	–	16	1
Siah; Jamegan	Division 1	2014–15	22	2	0	0	–	–	22	2
Siah; Jamegan	Pro League	2015–16	10	1	1	0	–	–	11	1
Career Totals			47	4	2	0	0	0	49	4
