= Mohsen Karami =

Iranian footballer

Personal information
- Full name: Mohsen Karami
- Date of birth: 11 August 1995 (age 31)
- Place of birth: Qom, Iran
- Height: 1.73 m (5 ft 8 in)
- Position: Attacking midfielder

Youth career
- 2007–2015: Saba Qom

Senior career*
Years	Team	Apps	(Gls)
2015–2018	Saba Qom	4	(0)
- * Club domestic league appearances and goals as of 17 December 2018

Mohsen Karami (Persian: محسن کرمی, born 11 August 1995) is an Iranian football midfielder.

== Club career ==
=== Saba Qom ===
Karami started his career with Saba Qom. In summer 2011 he was promoted to the first team and made his debut for Saba Qom against Saipa on 11 April 2015 as a substitute for Abolfazl Ebrahimi.

== Club career statistics ==
As of 14 June 2019

Club	Division	Season	League		Hazfi Cup		Asia		Total	
Club	Division	Season	Apps	Goals	Apps	Goals	Apps	Goals	Apps	Goals
Saba Qom	Pro League	2014–15	4	0	0	0	—		4	0
Saba Qom	Pro League	2015–16	0	0	0	0	—		0	0
Saba Qom	Pro League	2016–17	0	0	0	0	—		0	0
Saba Qom	Azadegan League	2017–18	0	0	0	0	—		0	0
Career total			4	0	0	0	—		4	0
