= Mohammad Hassan Ein Afshar =

Iranian footballer (born 1982)

Personal information
- Full name: Mohammad Hossein Eyn Afshar
- Date of birth: April 4, 1982 (age 44)
- Place of birth: Mashhad, Iran
- Position: Goalkeeper

Team information
- Current team: Sorkhpooshan Pakdasht
- Number: 1

Senior career*
Years	Team	Apps	(Gls)
2011–2016	Siah Jamegan	65	(0)
2016–2017	Baadraan Tehran	11	(0)
2017–2019	Siah Jamegan	19	(0)
2019–	Sorkhpooshan Pakdasht	10	(0)
- * Club domestic league appearances and goals as of 31 October 2015

Mohammad Hassan Ein Afshar (Persian: محمدحسن عین‌افشار) is an Iranian football goalkeeper who plays for Baadraan Tehran in the Azadegan League.

== Club career ==
Eyn Afshar started his career with Siah Jamegan from Division 2. He made his professional debut for Siah Jamegan on October 31, 2015, against Saipa as a starter.

== Club career statistics ==
As of 31 October 2015

Club	Division	Season	League		Hazfi Cup		Asia		Total	
Club	Division	Season	Apps	Goals	Apps	Goals	Apps	Goals	Apps	Goals
Siah; Jamegan	Division 2	2011–12	19	0	0	0	–	–	19	0
Siah; Jamegan	Division 2	2012–13	26	0	0	0	–	–	26	0
Siah; Jamegan	Division 1	2013–14	3	0	1	0	–	–	4	0
Siah; Jamegan	Division 1	2014–15	16	0	0	0	–	–	16	0
Siah; Jamegan	Pro League	2015–16	1	0	0	0	–	–	1	0
Career Totals			65	0	1	0	0	0	66	0
