= Erfan Badi =

Iranian association football player

Personal information
- Full name: Erfan Badi
- Date of birth: 17 July 1996 (age 30)
- Place of birth: Qom, Iran
- Height: 1.82 m (6 ft 0 in)
- Position: Left-back

Team information
- Current team: Machine Sazi
- Number: 14

Youth career
- –2015: Oghab
- 2015–2016: Esteghlal

Senior career*
Years	Team	Apps	(Gls)
2016–2018	Saba	23	(2)
2018–2019	Baadraan	4	(0)
2019–2020	Shahrdari Mahshahr	2	(0)
2020–2021	Fajr Sepasi	10	(0)
2021–	Machine Sazi	0	(0)
2022–	Khooshe Talaei Saveh F.C.	5	(0)
- * Club domestic league appearances and goals as of 30 March 2022

Erfan Badi (Persian: عرفان بادی; born 17 July 1996) is an Iranian professional footballer who plays as a left-back for Azadegan League club Machine Sazi.

== Career statistics ==
=== Club ===
As of 30 March 2022

Club	Season	League			Hazfi Cup		Total	
Club	Season	Division	Apps	Goals	Apps	Goals	Apps	Goals
Saba	2016–17	Persian Gulf Pro League	2	0	0	0	2	0
Saba	2017–18	Azadegan League	21	2	0	0	21	2
Saba	Total		23	2	0	0	23	2
Baadraan	2018–19	Azadegan League	4	0	0	0	4	0
Shahrdari Mahshahr	2019–20	League 2	2	0	1	0	3	0
Fajr Sepasi	2020–21	Azadegan League	10	0	0	0	10	0
Machine Sazi	2021–22	Azadegan League	0	0	0	0	0	0
Career total			39	2	1	0	40	2
