= Mehran Gorbanpour =

Iranian footballer

Personal information
- Date of birth: May 11, 1995 (age 31)
- Place of birth: Tabriz, Iran
- Position: Forward

Team information
- Current team: Tractor
- Number: 25

Youth career
- 2013–2016: Tractor

Senior career*
Years	Team	Apps	(Gls)
2015–2016	Tractor	2	(0)
2016–	Machine Sazi	0	(0)
- * Club domestic league appearances and goals as of 19 July 2016

Mehran Gorbanpour (Persian: مهران قربانپور, born 11 May 1995 in Tabriz) is an Iranian footballer who currently plays for Machine Sazi as a forward.

== Club career statistics ==
As of 26 May 2016.

He started his career with Tractor F.C. in 2015–16 Iran Pro League and played first match for his team against Gostaresh Foolad

Club	Division	Season	League		Hazfi Cup		Asia		Total	
Club	Division	Season	Apps	Goals	Apps	Goals	Apps	Goals	Apps	Goals
Tractor	Iran Pro League	2015–16	2	0	0	0	0	0	2	0
Career Totals			2	0	0	0	0	0	2	0
