= Alireza Salimi (footballer) =

Iranian footballer

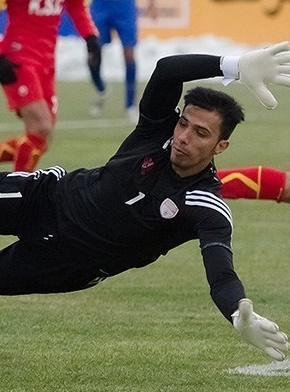

Personal information
- Date of birth: February 23, 1984 (age 42)
- Place of birth: Yazd, Iran
- Height: 1.86 m (6 ft 1 in)
- Position: Goalkeeper

Youth career
- Esteghlal

Senior career*
Years	Team	Apps	(Gls)
2009–2010	Tarbiat Yazd	17	(0)
2010–2016	Foolad	83	(0)
2016	Rah Ahan		
2016–2019	Baadraan		
- * Club domestic league appearances and goals as of 15 December 2015

Alireza Salimi (Persian: علیرضا سلیمی) is an Iranian professional football player currently playing for Baadraan in the Azadegan League.

== Career ==
Salimi played for Tarbiat Yazd before moving to Foolad in the summer of 2010. After Sosha Makani's move to Persepolis before the start of 2014–15 season, Salimi was made as the first-choice goalkeeper by club coach Dragan Skočić.

== Club career statistics ==
As of 15 May 2015

Club	Division	Season	League		Hazfi Cup		Asia		Total	
Club	Division	Season	Apps	Goals	Apps	Goals	Apps	Goals	Apps	Goals
Tarbiat Yazd	Division 1	2009–10	17	0	1	0	–	–	18	0
Foolad	Pro League	2010–11	5	0	0	0	–	–	5	0
Foolad	Pro League	2011–12	25	0	3	0	–	–	28	0
Foolad	Pro League	2012–13	8	0	0	0	–	–	8	0
Foolad	Pro League	2013–14	5	0	0	0	0	0	5	0
Foolad	Pro League	2014–15	28	0	1	0	6	0	35	0
Foolad	Pro League	2015–16	24	0	1	0	0	0	25	0
Career total			112	0	5	0	6	0	123	0

== Honours ==
Foolad

- Iran Pro League (1): 2013–14
