= Yaser Karami =

Iranian football Forward (born 1992)

Personal information
- Full name: Yaser Karami
- Date of birth: April 22, 1992 (age 34)
- Place of birth: Iran
- Position: Forward

Team information
- Current team: Moghavemat Tehran

Youth career
- 2009–2011: Saba Qom

Senior career*
Years	Team	Apps	(Gls)
2010–2011	Saba Qom	1	(0)
2011–2013	Moghavemat Tehran (Conscription)		

International career^{‡}
2008–2009	Iran U17		
2009–2010	Iran U20		
- * Club domestic league appearances and goals as of 30 December 2011 ‡ National team caps and goals as of 30 December 2011

Yaser Karami (Persian: یاسر کرمی, born April 22, 1992) is an Iranian football forward who plays for Moghavemat Tehran in Iran Football's 2nd Division.

== Club career ==
He played his first match for Saba Qom in 2010–11 season.

=== Club career statistics ===
As of 17 December 2011

Club performance			League		Cup		Continental		Total	
Season	Club	League	Apps	Goals	Apps	Goals	Apps	Goals	Apps	Goals
Iran			League		Hazfi Cup		Asia		Total	
2010–11	Saba Qom	Persian Gulf Cup	1	0	0	0	0	0	1	0
Total	Iran		1	0	0	0	0	0	1	0
Total	Career total			0	0	0	0	0	1	0

- Assist Goals

Season	Team	Assists
2011–12	Saba Qom	0
