= Mehrdad Tahmasebi =

Iranian footballer (born 1985)

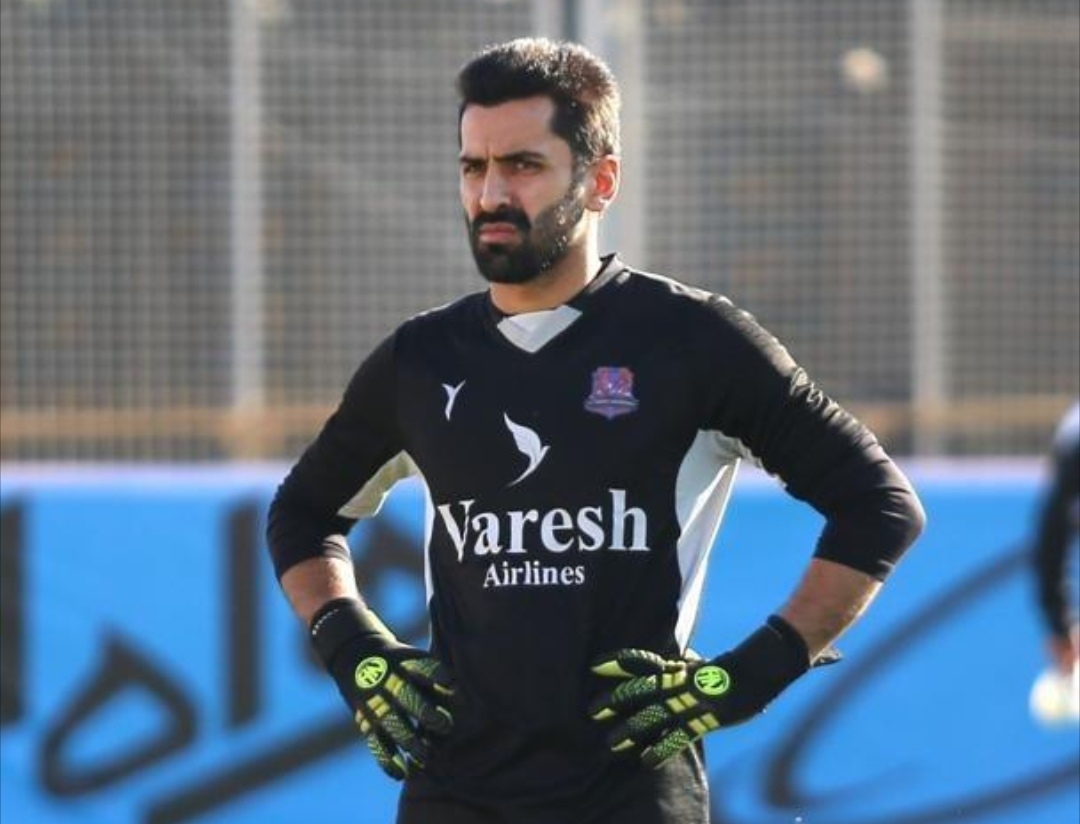

Personal information
- Full name: Mehrdad Tahmasebi
- Date of birth: 10 September 1985 (age 41)
- Place of birth: Behshahr, Iran
- Height: 1.85 m (6 ft 1 in)
- Position: Goalkeeper

Youth career
- 2000–2004: Persepolis
- 2004_2007: Pas Tehran

Senior career*
Years	Team	Apps	(Gls)
2006–2007	Pas Tehran	8	(0)
2007–2010	Etka	32	(0)
2010–2011	Nassaji	17	(0)
2011–2012	Sanati Kaveh	17	(0)
2012–2015	Saba Qom	68	(0)
2015–2016	Tractor Sazi	1	(0)
2016–2017	Foolad	19	(0)
2018–2019	Naft Masjed Soleyman	7	(0)
2019–	Baadraan	40	(0)
2020–2021	Nassaji	38	(0)
- * Club domestic league appearances and goals as of 15 May 2015

Mehrdad Tahmasebi (Persian: مهرداد طهماسبی; born 10 September 1985) is an Iranian footballer who plays in the Persian Gulf League.

== Club career ==
He started his career with Pas Tehran at youth levels. In summer 2012, he signed a two-year contract with Saba Qom.

=== Club Career Statistics ===
Last Update 15 May 2015

Club	Division	Season	League		Hazfi Cup		Asia		Total	
Club	Division	Season	Apps	Goals	Apps	Goals	Apps	Goals	Apps	Goals
Nassaji	Division 1	2010–11	17	0	2	0	–	–	19	0
Sanati Kaveh	Division 1	2011–12	17	0	1	0	–	–	18	0
Saba Qom	Pro League	2012–13	11	0	0	0	1	0	12	0
Saba Qom	Pro League	2013–14	8	0	0	0	–	–	8	0
Saba Qom	Pro League	2014–15	27	0	0	0	–	–	27	0
Tractor Sazi	Pro League	2015–16	1	0	1	0	0	0	1	0
Foolad	Pro League	2015–16	19	0	0	0	–	–	19	0
Naft Masjed Soleyman	Pro League	2018–19	7	0	0	0	0	0	7	0
Baadraan	Division 1	2019–20	4	0	0	0	0	0	4	0
Career Total			111	0	4	0	1	0	115	0
