= Abolfazl Ebrahimi =

Footballer

Personal information
- Date of birth: 23 September 1982 (age 44)
- Place of birth: Qazvin, Iran
- Height: 1.76 m (5 ft 9 in)
- Position: Midfielder

Team information
- Current team: Yadman Tehran
- Number: 8

Senior career*
Years	Team	Apps	(Gls)
2007–2008	Damash Tehran		
2008–2009	Kowsar		
2009–2010	Aluminium Hormozgan		
2010–2011	Sanati Kaveh		
2011–2012	Aluminium Hormozgan		
2012–2016	Saba Qom	111	(4)
2016–2019	Paykan	50	(0)
2019–2020	Baadraan	19	(0)
2023–	Yadman Tehran		
- * Club domestic league appearances and goals as of 30 November 2015

Abolfazl Ebrahimi (Persian: ابوالفضل ابراهیمی; born 23 September 1982) is an Iranian footballer who plays as a midfielder for Yadman Tehran.

== Club career ==
=== Saba Qom ===
Abolfazl Ebrahimi joined Saba Qom in summer 2012 with a 2-year contract. In summer 2014 he signed a one-year contract extension which kept him in Saba Qom until summer 2015.

== Club career statistics ==
As of 15 May 2015.

Club	Division	Season	League		Hazfi Cup		Asia		Total	
Club	Division	Season	Apps	Goals	Apps	Goals	Apps	Goals	Apps	Goals
Saba Qom	Pro League	2012–13	28	0	1	0	–	–	29	0
Saba Qom	Pro League	2013–14	26	2	2	0	–	–	28	2
Saba Qom	Pro League	2014–15	27	0	2	0	–	–	29	0
Career Totals			81	2	5	0	0	0	86	2

== Other Website ==
Abolfazl Ebrahimi on Instagram
