= Milad Soleiman Fallah =

Iranian footballer

Personal information
- Date of birth: 15 September 1986 (age 40)
- Place of birth: Karaj, Iran
- Height: 1.75 m (5 ft 9 in)
- Position: Striker

Youth career
- 2007–2010: Saipa Mehr Karaj

Senior career*
Years	Team	Apps	(Gls)
2010–2011	Saipa Mehr Karaj	33	(12)
2011–2014	Saba Qom	45	(6)
2014	Naft Masjed Soleyman	12	(1)
2014–2015	Esteghlal	4	(0)
2015–2016	Paykan	29	(8)
2016	Naft Masjed Soleyman	1	(0)
2017	Baadran	4	(0)
2017–2018	Oxin Alborz	4	(3)
2019–2020	Shohadaye Razakan Alborz		
2021–2022	Adak Kian		
- * Club domestic league appearances and goals

Milad Soleiman Fallah (Persian: میلاد سلیمان فلاح; born 15 September 1986) is an Iranian former footballer.

== Club career ==
Soleiman Fallah joined Saba Qom in 2011.

Club performance			League		Cup		Continental		Total	
Season	Club	League	Apps	Goals	Apps	Goals	Apps	Goals	Apps	Goals
Iran			League		Hazfi Cup		Asia		Total	
2011–12	Saba Qom	Pro League	2	2	0	0	-	-	2	2
Career total			2	2	0	0	0	0	2	2
