= Ahmad Khormali =

Iranian footballer

Personal information
- Full name: Ahmad Khormali
- Place of birth: Gonbad Kavous, Iran
- Position: Goalkeeper

Youth career
- 1992–1995: Payam Gonbad Kavous
- 1995–1996: Keshavarz Gonbad Kavous

Senior career*
Years	Team	Apps	(Gls)
1996–1998	Mohemmat Sazi		
1998–1999	Nebitçi Balkanabat		
1999–2007	Aboumoslem		
2006	→ Persepolis Khorasan (loan)		
2007–2009	Aluminium Arak		
2009–2011	Aluminium Hormozgan	16	(0)
2011–2012	Saba Qom	1	(0)
- * Club domestic league appearances and goals

Ahmad Khormali (Persian: احمد خرمالی) is an Iranian football goalkeeper. He wears pyjama-like tracksuit bottoms while playing after Hungarian goalkeeper Gábor Király. He holds a B.Sc. in Social Sciences from Ferdowsi University of Mashhad.

== Club career ==
He was linked to Persepolis in 2005, but was not signed. Khormali Played for Peresepolis Khorasan in Turkmenistan Presidential Cup 2006. He joined Iran Pro League's Saba Qom on June 14, 2011.

Club performance			League		Cup		Continental		Total	
Season	Club	League	Apps	Goals	Apps	Goals	Apps	Goals	Apps	Goals
Iran			League		Hazfi Cup		Asia		Total	
2003–04	Aboumoslem	Pro League	5	0			-	-		
2004–05	Aboumoslem	Pro League	13	0			-	-		
2005–06	Aboumoslem	Pro League	0	0			-	-		
2006–07	Aboumoslem	Pro League	0	0			-	-		
2007–08	Aluminium Arak	Division 1					-	-		
2008–09	Aluminium Arak	Division 1					-	-		
2009–10	Aluminium Hormozgan	Division 1	14	0			-	-		
2010–11	Aluminium Hormozgan	Division 1	2	0			-	-		
2011–12	Saba Qom	Pro League	1	0			-	-		
Career total										
