= Iman Razaghirad =

Iranian footballer

Personal information
- Full name: Iman Razaghirad
- Date of birth: August 9, 1978 (age 48)
- Place of birth: Iran
- Height: 1.81 m (5 ft 11 in)
- Position: Forward

Youth career
- 1999–2001: Aboomoslem

Senior career*
Years	Team	Apps	(Gls)
2001–2004	Aboomoslem	36	(17)
2004–2007	Pas	52	(16)
2007–2008	Steel Azin	20	(7)
2008–2009	Saipa	23	(5)
2009–2010	Peykan	27	(6)
2010–2013	Rah Ahan	47	(9)
2013	Saba Qom	10	(5)
2013–2014	Paykan	17	(3)
- * Club domestic league appearances and goals as of 24 January 2013

Iman Razaghirad (born August 9, 1978) is an Iranian footballer who plays as a forward.

== Club career ==
In 2009, Razaghirad joined Paykan after playing the previous season at Saipa.

=== Club career statistics ===
As of 24 January 2013

Club performance			League		Cup		Continental		Total	
Season	Club	League	Apps	Goals	Apps	Goals	Apps	Goals	Apps	Goals
Iran			League		Hazfi Cup		Asia		Total	
2001–02	Aboomoslem	Pro League	12	6			-	-		
2002–03	Aboomoslem	Pro League	11	3			-	-		
2003–04	Aboomoslem	Pro League	13	8			-	-		
2004–05	Pas	Pro League	29	9				0		
2005–06	Pas	Pro League	18	6			-	-		
2006–07	Pas	Pro League	5	1			-	-		
2007–08	Steel Azin	Division 1	20	7			-	-		
2008–09	Saipa	Pro League	23	5	1	0	2	1	26	6
2009–10	Paykan	Pro League	27	6			-	-		
2010–11	Rah Ahan	Pro League	25	6	1	0	-	-	26	6
2011–12	Rah Ahan	Pro League	16	2	1	0	-	-	17	3
2012–13	Rah Ahan	Pro League	6	1	0	0	-	-	6	0
2012–13	Saba	Pro League	10	5			-	-		
2013–14	Paykan	Division 1	17	3			-	-		
Career total				68				1		

- Assist Goals

Season	Team	Assists
08–09	Saipa	2
09–10	Paykan	3
