= Masoud Haghjou =

Iranian football player (born 1986)

Personal information
- Full name: Masoud Haghjou
- Date of birth: June 30, 1986 (age 40)
- Place of birth: Nur, Iran
- Position: Defender

Team information
- Current team: Baadraan Tehran F.C.
- Number: 10

Senior career*
| Years | Team | Apps | (Gls) |
| 2007–2010 | Shamoushak | 42 | (2) |
| 2010–2011 | Sanat Sari | 23 | (3) |
| 2011–2012 | Shahrdari Arak | 25 | (3) |
| 2012-2015 | Saba Qom | 25 | (4) |
| 2015- | Baadraan Tehran F.C. | | |
- * Club domestic league appearances and goals as of 15 May 2015

Masoud Haghjou (Persian: مسعود حق جو, born June 30, 1986) is an Iranian football player, who plays in the defender position. He is currently a member of the Iran's Premier League football club, Baadraan Tehran F.C.

== Club career ==
=== Club career statistics ===
As of 25 July 2012

| Club performance | | | League | | Cup | | Continental | | Total | |
| Season | Club | League | Apps | Goals | Apps | Goals | Apps | Goals | Apps | Goals |
| Iran | | | League | | Hazfi Cup | | Asia | | Total | |
|---|---|---|---|---|---|---|---|---|---|---|
| 2009–10 | Shamoushak | Azadegan League | 9 | 2 | | | - | - | | |
| 2010–11 | Sanat Sari | Azadegan League | 19 | 0 | | | - | - | | |
| 2011–12 | Shahrdari Arak | Azadegan League | 19 | 1 | | | - | - | | |
| 2012–13 | Saba Qom | Iran Pro League | 1 | 0 | 0 | 0 | 0 | 0 | 1 | 0 |
| Career total | | | 48 | 3 | | | 0 | 0 | | |
