= Meysam Khosravi =

Iranian footballer (born 1983)

Personal information
- Full name: Meysam Khosravi
- Date of birth: 18 May 1983 (age 43)
- Place of birth: Iran
- Position: Midfielder

Team information
- Current team: Naft Tehran

Youth career
- Paykan

Senior career*
Years	Team	Apps	(Gls)
2005–2009	Paykan	77	(4)
2009–2010	Steel Azin	17	(1)
2010–2011	Foolad	14	(0)
2011–2012	Naft Tehran	29	(0)
2012–2013	Saba Qom	3	(0)
2013–	Aboumoslem	5	(0)
- * Club domestic league appearances and goals as of 27 September 2010 ‡ National team caps and goals as of 13 May 2010

Meysam Khosravi (born 18 May 1983) is an Iranian footballer who plays for Naft Tehran in the IPL.

== Career ==
Khosravi joined Steel Azin F.C. in 2009 after spending his entire career with Paykan F.C.

=== Club career statistics ===
As of 13 December 2010

Club performance			League		Cup		Continental		Total	
Season	Club	League	Apps	Goals	Apps	Goals	Apps	Goals	Apps	Goals
Iran			League		Hazfi Cup		Asia		Total	
2005–06	Paykan	Division 1	19	0			-	-		
2006–07	Paykan	Pro League	13	2			-	-		
2007–08	Paykan	Pro League	17	2	2	0	-	-	19	2
2008–09	Paykan	Pro League	28	0	1	0	-	-	29	0
2009–10	Steel Azin	Pro League	17	1			-	-		
2010–11	Foolad	Pro League	7	0	2	1	-	-	9	1
2011–12	Naft Tehran	Pro League	0	0	0	0	-	-	0	0
Career total			101	5			0	0		

- Assist Goals

Season	Team	Assists
10–11	Foolad	2
11-12	Naft Tehran	0
