= Karim Eslami =

Iranian footballer

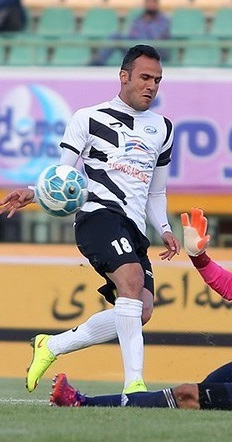

Personal information
- Full name: Abdul Karim Eslami
- Date of birth: 8 April 1986 (age 40)
- Place of birth: Noshahr, Iran
- Height: 1.86 m (6 ft 1 in)
- Position: Striker

Team information
- Current team: Havadar
- Number: 99

Senior career*
Years	Team	Apps	(Gls)
2009–2010	Gol Gohar		(1)
2010–2011	Etka Gorgan	23	(4)
2011–2013	Saba Qom	44	(5)
2013–2015	Mes Kerman	36	(6)
2015–2017	Saba Qom	36	(5)
2017–2020	Baadraan	73	(19)
2020–2023	Nassaji	80	(13)
2023–2024	Havadar	27	(5)
2024–2025	Paykan	12	(2)
2025–	Havadar	10	(1)
- * Club domestic league appearances and goals as of 21 April 2025

Abdul Karim Eslami (Persian: عبدالکریم اسلامی; born 8 April 1986) is an Iranian football striker who plays for Havadar in the Persian Gulf Pro League.

== Club career ==
=== Esteghlal Khuzestan ===
Eslami joined Saba Qom in summer 2011. After second season with Qomi side, he moved to Mes Kerman. In summer 2015 he moved back to Saba Qom.

== Club career statistics ==
As of 31 October 2015

Club	Division	Season	League		Hazfi Cup		Asia		Other		Total	
Club	Division	Season	Apps	Goals	Apps	Goals	Apps	Goals	Apps	Goals	Apps	Goals
Saba Qom	Pro League	2011–12	28	3	3	0	–	–	0	0	31	3
Saba Qom	Pro League	2012–13	16	2	1	0	1	0	0	0	18	2
Saba Qom	Total		44	5	4	0	1	0	0	0	49	5
Mes Kerman	PGPL	2013–14	23	2	5	1	–	–	0	0	28	3
Mes Kerman	Division 1	2014–15	20	4	0	0	–	–	0	0	20	4
Mes Kerman	Total		43	6	5	1	0	0	0	0	48	7
Saba Qom	Pro League	2015–16	25	3	2	1	–	–	0	0	27	5
Saba Qom	Pro League	2016–17	11	2	0	0	–	–	0	0	11	2
Saba Qom	Total		36	5	2	1	0	0	0	0	38	6
Baadraan	Azadegan League	2016-17	13	1	0	0	0	0	0	0	13	1
Baadraan	Azadegan League	2017-18	28	9	2	1	0	0	0	0	30	10
Baadraan	Azadegan League	2018-19	19	4	0	0	0	0	0	0	19	4
Baadraan	Azadegan League	2019-20	13	5	0	0	0	0	0	0	13	5
Baadraan	Total		73	19	2	1	0	0	0	0	75	20
Nassaji	Persian Gulf Pro League	2020-21	28	3	2	0	0	0	0	0	30	3
Nassaji	Persian Gulf Pro League	2021-22	27	7	4	2	0	0	0	0	31	9
Nassaji	Persian Gulf Pro League	2022-23	25	3	4	0	0	0	1	0	30	3
Nassaji	Total		80	13	10	2	0	0	1	0	91	15
Havadar	Persian Gulf Pro League	2023-24	21	4	1	0	0	0	0	0	22	4
Career totals			297	52	26	5	1	0	1	0	325	57
