= Alireza Ghadiri =

Iranian football goalkeeper (born 1979)

Personal information
- Full name: Alireza Ghadiri
- Date of birth: 8 October 1979 (age 47)
- Place of birth: Iran
- Position: Goalkeeper

Team information
- Current team: Saba Qom
- Number: 21

Senior career*
Years	Team	Apps	(Gls)
2006–2007	Homa		
2007–2008	Saba Qom	3	(0)
2010	Tarbiat Yazd	6	(0)
2010–2012	Mes Kerman	15	(0)
2012–	Saba Qom	0	(0)
- * Club domestic league appearances and goals as of 27 April 2012 ‡ National team caps and goals as of 24 June 2011

Alireza Ghadiri (Persian: علیرضا قدیری, born 8 October 1979) is an Iranian football goalkeeper, currently playing for Saba.

== Club career ==
=== Club career statistics ===
As of 25 July 2012

Club performance			League		Cup		Continental		Total	
Season	Club	League	Apps	Goals	Apps	Goals	Apps	Goals	Apps	Goals
Iran			League		Hazfi Cup		Asia		Total	
2007–08	Saba Qom	Iran Pro League	3	0		0	-	-		0
2009–10	Tarbiat Yazd	Azadegan League	6	0		0	-	-		0
2010–11	Mes Kerman	Iran Pro League	14	0		0	-	-		0
2011–12	Mes Kerman	Iran Pro League	1	0		0	-	-		0
2012–13	Saba Qom	Iran Pro League	0	0	0	0	0	0	0	0
Career total			24	0		0	0	0		0
