= David Tahnya Wirikom =

Cameroonian footballer

David Wirikom
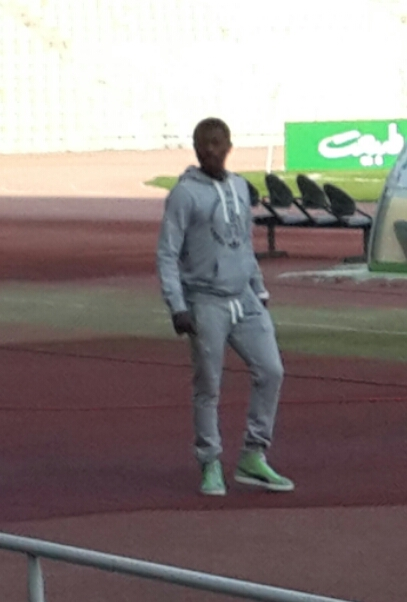

Personal information
- Full name: David Tahnya Wirikom
- Date of birth: 28 August 1990 (age 36)
- Place of birth: Kumba, Cameroon
- Height: 1.77 m (5 ft 10 in)
- Position: Attacking midfielder

Senior career*
Years	Team	Apps	(Gls)
2007–2008	Les Astres FC		
2008–2009	Douala Athletic Club		
2009–2013	Shirin Faraz/ Rahian	51	(4)
2011	→ Nassaji (loan)	12	(2)
2012–2013	→ Saba Qom (loan)	26	(1)
2013–2014	Rah Ahan	12	(0)
2014–2015	Naft Tehran	13	(2)
2018	Gandzasar Kapan	7	(1)

International career
2011	Cameroon U23	5	(1)
- * Club domestic league appearances and goals as of 15 August 2018

David Tahnya Wirikom (June 28, 1990) is a Cameroonian footballer who last played for Gandzasar Kapan in the Armenian Premier League.

== Career ==
=== Club ===
Wirikom joined Iran Pro League side Saba Qom on loan in 2012 after spending the previous years at Shirin Faraz and Nassaji in Azadegan League. In summer of 2013 Wirikom signed a two-year contract with Rah Ahan. After only one season at the club Wirikom joined cross town rivals Naft Tehran.

=== International ===
In 2011, Wirikom received his first cap for the Cameroon national under-23 football team. He made five appearances with the team and scoring once.

=== Club statistics ===
Club performance			League		Asia		Total	
Season	Club	League	Apps	Goals	Apps	Goals	Apps	Goals
2012–13	Saba	Iran Pro League	26	1	1	0	27	1
2013–14	Rahian	Azadegan League	6	0	–	–	6	0
2013–14	Rah Ahan	Iran Pro League	12	0	–	–	12	0
2014–15	Naft Tehran	Iran Pro League	13	2	0	0	13	2
Country	Iran		57	2	1	0	58	2
Total			57	2	1	0	58	2

== External sources ==
- Profile at Persianleague.com
