= Mohammad Aram Tab =

Iranian footballer

Personal information
- Full name: Mohammad Amin Aram Tab
- Date of birth: 7 February 1985 (age 41)
- Place of birth: Behbahan, Iran
- Height: 1.74 m (5 ft 9 in)
- Position: Left back

Senior career*
Years	Team	Apps	(Gls)
2007–2009	Kowsar	2	(0)
2009–2010	Tarbiat Yazd	15	(0)
2010–2011	Nassaji Mazandaran	23	(2)
2011–2012	Aluminium Hormozgan	26	(3)
2012–2016	Saba Qom	93	(6)
2016–2017	Persepolis	3	(0)
2017–2018	Esteghlal Khuzestan	2	(0)
2019–2020	Baadraan	10	(0)
2021–2022	Oghab Tehran	3	(0)
- * Club domestic league appearances and goals

Mohammad Amin Aram Tab (Persian: محمدامین آرام طبع; born 7 February 1985) is an Iranian former football defender.

== Club career ==
Aram Tab joined Saba Qom in 2012 after spending the previous year at Aluminium Hormozgan.

Club performance			League		Cup		Continental		Total	
Season	Club	League	Apps	Goals	Apps	Goals	Apps	Goals	Apps	Goals
Iran			League		Hazfi Cup		Asia		Total	
2010–11	Nassaji Mazandaran	Azadegan League	20	1			-	-		
2010–11	Aluminium Hormozgan	Azadegan League	24	0			-	-		
2012–13	Saba Qom	Persian Gulf Cup	1	0	0	0	0	0	1	0
Career total			45	1			0	0		

== Honours ==
=== Club ===
Aluminium Hormozgan

- Azadegan League (1): 2011–12

Persepolis

- Persian Gulf Pro League (1): 2016–17
