= Mojtaba Mobini Pour =

Iranian footballer

Mojtaba Mobinipour
Personal information
- Full name: Seyed Mojtaba Mobinipour
- Date of birth: 25 December 1990 (age 35)
- Place of birth: Qom, Iran
- Height: 1.83 m (6 ft 0 in)
- Position: Centre back

Youth career
- –2011: Saba

Senior career*
Years	Team	Apps	(Gls)
2011–2013	Saba	19	(0)
2013–2017	Vahdat Qom		
2017–2018	Saba	20	(0)
- * Club domestic league appearances and goals as of 21 September 2021

Mojtaba Mobinipour (Persian: مجتبی مبینی پور; born 25 December 1990) is an Iranian professional footballer.

== Career statistics ==
As of 21 September 2021

Club	Season	League			Hazfi Cup		Asia		Total	
Club	Season	Division	Apps	Goals	Apps	Goals	Apps	Goals	Apps	Goals
Saba	2011–12	Persian Gulf Pro League	4	0	—				4	0
Saba	2012–13	Persian Gulf Pro League	15	0	—		0	0	15	0
Saba	2017–18	Azadegan League	20	0	0	0	—		20	0
Career total			39	0	0	0	0	0	39	0
