= Majid Heidari =

Iranian footballer

Majid Heydari
Personal information
- Full name: Majid Heydari
- Date of birth: July 13, 1982 (age 44)
- Place of birth: Rey, Iran
- Position: Centre-back

Team information
- Current team: Saba Qom
- Number: 20

Senior career*
Years	Team	Apps	(Gls)
2006–2009	Sanaye Arak		
2009–2011	Pas Hamedan	48	(2)
2011	Fajr Sepasi	11	(0)
2012–	Saba Qom	16	(0)
- * Club domestic league appearances and goals as of 2 August 2012

Majid Heidari (born July 13, 1982) is an Iranian football player who plays in the defender position. He is currently a member of the Iran's Premier League football club, Saba Qom F.C.

== Club career ==
Heidari plays for Pas Hamedan from 2009 to 2011. He joined Fajr Sepasi in 2011 but the contract had been terminated by the club because of the problems between Heidari and the club's coach, Mahmoud Yavari. in winter 2012 he joined Saba Qom.

=== Club career statistics ===
As of 2 August 2012

Club performance			League		Cup		Continental		Total	
Season	Club	League	Apps	Goals	Apps	Goals	Apps	Goals	Apps	Goals
Iran			League		Hazfi Cup		Asia		Total	
2009–10	Pas Hamedan	Pro League	23	2	1	0	–		24	2
2010–11	Pas Hamedan	Pro League	25	0	0	0	–		25	1
2011–12	Fajr Sepasi	Pro League	11	0	0	0	–		11	0
2011–12	Saba	Pro League	14	0	0	0	–		14	0
2012–13	Saba	Pro League	2	0	0	0	0	0	2	0
Career total			75	2	1	0	0	0	76	2
