= Mehdi Badrlou =

Iranian footballer

Personal information
- Full name: Mehdi Badrlou
- Date of birth: January 14, 1986 (age 40)
- Place of birth: Tehran, Iran
- Position: Defensive midfielder

Senior career*
Years	Team	Apps	(Gls)
2008–2009	Aluminium Arak		
2009–2011	Aluminium Hormozgan	22	(1)
2011–2013	Saba Qom	46	(0)
2013–2016	Foolad	69	(4)
2016–2017	Saipa	7	(0)
- * Club domestic league appearances and goals as of 31 July 2015

Mehdi Badrlou is an Iranian footballer who plays for Saipa in the IPL.

== Club career ==
Badrlou joined Saba Qom in 2011 after spending the previous season with Aluminium Hormozgan in the Azadegan League. He joined Foolad Khuzestan in 2013 and won the Iran Pro League title in the same season. He joined Saipa

== Club career statistics ==
As of 15 May 2015.

Club	Division	Season	League		Hazfi Cup		Asia		Total		
Club	Division	Season	Apps	Goals	Apps	Goals	Apps	Goals	Apps	Goals	
Saba Qom	Pro League	2011–12	30	0	3	0	–	–	28	0	
Saba Qom	Pro League	2012–13	16	0	1	0	–	–	8	0	
Foolad	Pro League	2013–14	23	2	2	0	6	0	5	0	
Foolad	Pro League	2014–15	29	1	1	0	4	0	34	1	
Foolad	Pro League	2015–16	18	1	1	0	0	0	19	1	
Saipa	Iran Pro League	2016–17	0	0	0	0	0	0	0	0	
Saipa	Career total			116	3	8	0	10	0	134	3

== External sources ==
- Profile at Persianleague
- Mehdi Badrlou at Soccerway (archived)
