= Milad Nouri (footballer, born 1986) =

Iranian football midfielder

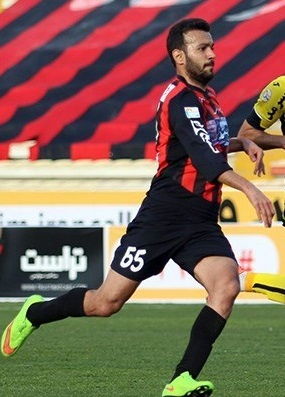

Personal information
- Date of birth: 3 May 1986 (age 40)
- Place of birth: Dezful, Iran
- Height: 1.83 m (6 ft 0 in)
- Position: Central midfielder

Youth career
- 2002–2003: Persepolis

Senior career*
Years	Team	Apps	(Gls)
2003–2006	Foolad	45	(0)
2006–2008	Steel Azin	22	(0)
2008–2010	Esteghlal	2	(0)
2009	→ Aboomoslem (loan)	8	(0)
2010–2011	Esteghlal Ahvaz	24	(1)
2011–2013	Saba Qom	50	(6)
2013–2014	Rah Ahan	5	(0)
2014–2015	Paykan	12	(1)
2015	Esteghlal	8	(0)
2016–2017	Siah Jamegan	13	(1)
2017	Khooneh Be Khooneh	10	(1)
2019	Al-Najaf	0	(0)
2019–2020	Mashin Sazi	19	(0)
2021	Mes Kerman	8	(0)

International career
2006–2008	Iran U-23	10	(5)
2012	Iran	2	(0)
- * Club domestic league appearances and goals

Milad Nouri (Persian: میلاد نوری; born 3 May 1986) is an Iranian former football player who played as a midfielder.

== Club career ==
Nouri played for Foolad in the 2006 AFC Champions League group stage. He joined Saba Qom in 2011 and was the leading Iran Pro League scorer in week 2 with four goals. By Week 10, Nouri was second with six goals. He finished the year with six goals, with Jalal Rafkhaei snatching eighteen and winning the golden boot. He joined Rah Ahan in the summer of 2013 with a three-year contract.

=== Club career statistics ===
Last Update 18 February 2015

Club performance			League		Cup		Continental		Total	
Season	Club	League	Apps	Goals	Apps	Goals	Apps	Goals	Apps	Goals
Iran			League		Hazfi Cup		Asia		Total	
2003–04	Foolad	Pro League		0			-	-		
2004–05	Foolad	Pro League		0			-	-		
2005–06	Foolad	Pro League	14	0				0		
2006–07	Steel Azin	Division 1					-	-		
2007–08	Steel Azin	Division 1		0			-	-		
2008–09	Esteghlal	Pro League	2	0	1	1	0	0	3	1
2009–10	Aboomoslem	Pro League	8	0	0	0	-	-	8	0
2009–10	Esteghlal	Pro League	0	0	1	2	1	0	2	2
2010–11	Esteghlal Ahvaz	Division 1	24	1			-	-		
2011–12	Saba Qom	Pro League	18	0	1	0	-	-	19	0
2012–13	Saba Qom	Pro League	32	6	1	0	1	0	34	6
2013–14	Rah Ahan	Pro League	5	0	2	0	-	-	7	0
2014–15	Paykan	Pro League	11	1	1	0	-	-	12	1
2014–15	Esteghlal	Pro League	8	0	0	0	0	0	8	0

- Assist Goals

Season	Team	Assists
05–06	Foolad	2
09–10	Aboomoslem	1
09–10	Esteghlal	0
11–12	Saba Qom	2
12–13	Saba Qom	0
13–14	Rah Ahan	1
14–15	Paykan	0

== Honours ==
Esteghlal

- Iran Pro League (1): 2008–09
