= Farid Behzadi Karimi =

Iranian footballer (born 1989)

Farid Karimi
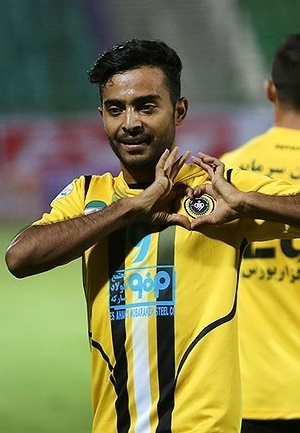

Personal information
- Full name: Farid Behzadi Karimi
- Date of birth: 14 May 1989 (age 37)
- Place of birth: Shahreza, Isfahan, Iran
- Height: 1.76 m (5 ft 9 in)
- Position: Winger

Youth career
- 2008–2010: Nassaji Mazandaran

Senior career*
Years	Team	Apps	(Gls)
2010–2011	Nassaji Mazandaran	14	(3)
2011–2012	Steel Azin	17	(1)
2012–2016	Saba Qom	67	(30)
2014–2015	→ Tractor (loan)	26	(2)
2016–2017	Sepahan	27	(3)
2017	Sanat Naft Abadan	6	(0)
2017–2018	Esteghlal Khuzestan	14	(1)
2018–2020	Machine Sazi	32	(0)
2020–2021	Naft Masjed Soleyman	5	(0)
- * Club domestic league appearances and goals as of 16 May 2016 (UTC)

Farid Behzadi Karimi (Persian: فرید بهزادی کریمی, born 14 May 1989 in Shahreza, Esfahan, Iran) is an Iranian footballer who plays for Naft Masjed Soleyman in the Persian Gulf Pro League. He usually plays as a striker. He is an ethnic Qashqayi.

== Club career ==
Karimi joined Saba Qom in 2012 after spending the previous year at Steel Azin. In summer of 2014 Karimi went to Tractor for conscription issues.

Club performance			League		Cup		Continental		Total	
Season	Club	League	Apps	Goals	Apps	Goals	Apps	Goals	Apps	Goals
Iran			League		Hazfi Cup		Asia		Total	
2011–12	Saba Qom	Pro League	26	7	1	0	0	0	27	7
2016–17	Sepahan	Iran Pro League	25	3	5	1	0	0	30	4
Career total			51	10	6	1	0	0	57	11
