= Saeid Lotfi (footballer, born 1992) =

Iranian footballer

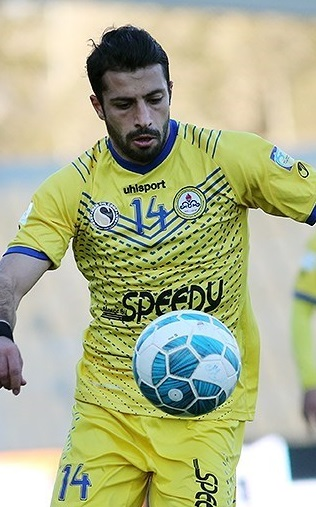

Personal information
- Date of birth: 16 July 1992 (age 34)
- Place of birth: Ilam, Iran
- Height: 1.80 m (5 ft 11 in)
- Position: Full back

Youth career
- Alavi Ilam
- 2009–2011: Sepahan

Senior career*
Years	Team	Apps	(Gls)
2009–2012	Sepahan	0	(0)
2011	→ Rah Ahan (loan)	0	(0)
2012	→ Shahradri Arak (loan)	11	(1)
2012–2014	Saba Qom	29	(0)
2014–2016	Naft Tehran	17	(1)
2016–2017	Saipa	20	(0)
2017–2018	Sanat Naft	6	(0)

International career
2008–2009	Iran U17	4	(0)
2009–2010	Iran U20	3	(0)
2012–2014	Iran U22	9	(0)
- * Club domestic league appearances and goals

Saeid Lotfi (Persian: سعید لطفی; born 16 July 1992) is an Iranian former football defender.

== Club career ==
Lotfi joined Saba Qom in 2012 after spending the previous year at Shahrdari Arak. In the summer of 2014 Lotfi signed a two-year contract with Naft Tehran.

=== Club career statistics ===
Club	Division	Season	League		Hazfi Cup		Asia		Total	
Club	Division	Season	Apps	Goals	Apps	Goals	Apps	Goals	Apps	Goals
Sepahan	Pro League	2009–10	0	0	0	0	0	0	0	0
Sepahan	Pro League	2010–11	0	0	0	0	0	0	0	0
Rah Ahan	Pro League	2011–12	0	0	1	0	-	-	1	0
Shahrdari Arak	Division 1	2011–12	11	1	0	0	-	-	11	1
Saba Qom	Pro League	2012–13	25	0	0	0	0	0	25	0
Saba Qom	Pro League	2013–14	4	0	0	0	-	-	4	0
Naft Tehran	Pro League	2014–15	4	0	0	0	0	0	4	0
Career total			44	1	1	0	0	0	45	1

== International ==
=== U17 ===
Lotfi featured for Iran in the 2009 FIFA U-17 World Cup.

=== U22 ===
He invited to National U-22 team in 2012 by Alireza Mansourian.
