= Yadegar-e Emam Stadium (Qom) =

Coordinates: 34.5435°N 50.7502°E

Yadegar-e-Imam Stadium
- Qom Stadium
- Interactive map of Yadegar-e-Imam Stadium
- Full name: Yadegar-e-Imam Stadium
- Location: Qom, Iran
- Owner: Saba Qom F.C.
- Operator: Saba Qom F.C.
- Capacity: 10,610 (Football)
- Surface: Grass

Construction
- Opened: 2008
- Closed: 2018

Tenant
- Saba Qom F.C. 2008-2018

The Yadegar-e-Imam Stadium (Persian: ورزشگاه یادگار امام قم) was a multi-purpose stadium in Qom, Iran. The stadium holds 10,610 people.
