= Mehdi Momeni =

Iranian footballer

Personal information
- Full name: Mehdi Momeni Larimi
- Date of birth: 21 September 1985 (age 41)
- Place of birth: Juybar, Iran
- Height: 1.80 m (5 ft 11 in)
- Position: Attacking midfielder

Youth career
- 2004–2006: Nassaji Mazandaran

Senior career*
Years	Team	Apps	(Gls)
2005–2010	Nassaji Mazandaran		
2010–2012	Foolad	55	(4)
2012–2014	Saba Qom	55	(7)
2014–2015	Esteghlal Khuzestan	30	(8)
2015	Naft Tehran	7	(0)
2015–2016	Esteghlal	8	(0)
2016–2017	Esteghlal Khuzestan	28	(2)
2017–2019	Paykan	53	(3)
2019–20	Sanat Naft Abadan	21	(0)
2020–2021	Machine Sazi	17	(0)
2022–2023	Malavan	27	(3)
- * Club domestic league appearances and goals

Mehdi Momeni Larimi (Persian: مهدی مومنی لاریمی; born 21 September 1985) is an Iranian professional footballer who plays as an attacking midfielder.

== Club career ==
Momeni joined Foolad in 2010 after spending the previous year at Nassaji Mazandaran.

== Career statistics ==
As of 6 July 2015

Club	Division	Season	League		Hazfi Cup		Asia		Total	
Club	Division	Season	Apps	Goals	Apps	Goals	Apps	Goals	Apps	Goals
Foolad	Pro League	2010–11	28	3			–	–		
Foolad	Pro League	2011–12	27	1			–	–		
Saba Qom	Pro League	2012–13	30	5	1	0	1	0	32	5
Saba Qom	Pro League	2013–14	28	2	1	0	–	–	29	3
Esteghlal Kh.	Pro League	2014–15	28	8	0	0	–	–	28	8
Career total			133	19			1	0		
