= Akbar Sadeghi =

Iranian footballer and coach (born 1985)

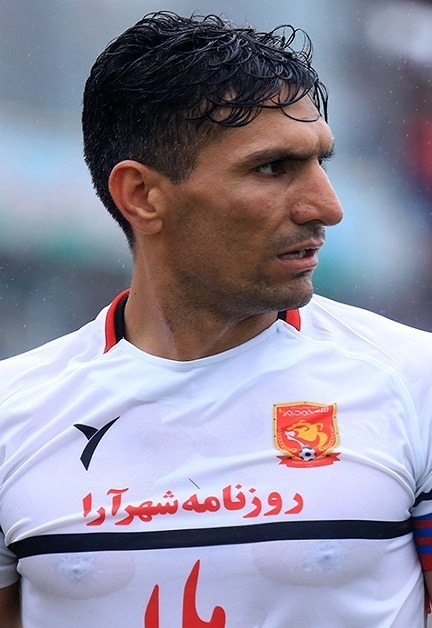

Personal information
- Full name: Akbar Sadeghi Badie
- Date of birth: 11 March 1985 (age 41)
- Place of birth: Hamedan, Iran
- Height: 1.78 m (5 ft 10 in)
- Position: Centre midfielder

Team information
- Current team: Nassaji (assistant coach)

Youth career
- Kowsar

Senior career*
Years	Team	Apps	(Gls)
2007–2009	Moghavemat Tehran		
2009–2010	Aluminium Hormozgan	6	(0)
2010–2011	Sanati Kaveh	22	(0)
2011–2014	Saba Qom	78	(4)
2014–2015	Padideh	26	(3)
2015–2016	Zob Ahan	15	(1)
2016	Saba Qom	13	(2)
2016–2017	Naft Tehran	28	(1)
2017–2021	Shahr Khodro	98	(3)
2021–2023	Nassaji	51	(0)

International career
2012	Iran	1	(0)

Managerial career
- 2025–: Nassaji (assistant)
- * Club domestic league appearances and goals

Akbar Sadeghi Badie (Persian: اکبر صادقی; born 11 March 1985) is an Iranian football coach and a former player who is an assistant coach with Nassaji in Persian Gulf Pro League. He usually played as a midfielder.

== Club career ==
Sadeghi joined Saba Qom in 2011 after spending the previous year at Sanati Kaveh.

Club performance			League		Cup		Continental		Total	
Season	Club	League	Apps	Goals	Apps	Goals	Apps	Goals	Apps	Goals
Iran			League		Hazfi Cup		Asia		Total	
2009–10	Aluminium	Division 1	6	0			–	–		
2010–11	Sanati Kaveh	Division 1	22	0			–	–		
2011–12	Saba Qom	Pro League	23	1			–	–		
2012–13	Saba Qom	Pro League	26	2	1	0	1	0	28	2
2013–14	Saba Qom	Pro League	28	1	1	0	–	–	29	1
2014–15	Padideh	Pro League	26	3	3	0	–	–	29	3
2015–16	Zob Ahan	Pro League	15	1	3	0	0	0	18	1
Career total			146	8	8	0	1	0	155	8

- Assist Goals

Season	Team	Assists
11–12	Saba Qom	1
12–13	Saba Qom	0
