= Mohsen Bayat =

Iranian footballer

Personal information
- Date of birth: 18 July 1984 (age 42)
- Place of birth: Khansar, Iran
- Height: 1.74 m (5 ft 8 1/2 in)
- Positions: Right-back; right winger

Team information
- Current team: Sepahan Doroud

Youth career
- 2000–2004: Polyacryl

Senior career*
Years	Team	Apps	(Gls)
2002–2004	Polyacryl		
2004–2005	Sepahan	1	(0)
2005–2015	Saba Qom	159	(26)
2015	Esteghlal Khuzestan	11	(0)
2015–2016	Padideh	9	(1)
2017–2018	Esteghlal Sialk	3	(0)
2018	Shahrdari Hamedan	0	(0)
2023–	Sepahan Doroud		
- * Club domestic league appearances and goals as of 30 September 2018

Mohsen Bayat (Persian: محسن بيات; born 18 July 1984) is an Iranian football midfielder who plays for Sepahan Doroud.

== Career ==
Bayat started his career with local side Polyacryl, before moving to Sepahan and then Saba Qom.

=== Club career statistics ===
As of 18 August 2011

Club performance			League		Cup		Continental		Total	
Season	Club	League	Apps	Goals	Apps	Goals	Apps	Goals	Apps	Goals
Iran			League		Hazfi Cup		Asia		Total	
2004–05	Sepahan	Pro League	0	0				0		
2005–06	Saba	Pro League	0	0				0		
2006–07	Saba	Pro League	16	1			-	-		
2007–08	Saba	Pro League	8	0			-	-		
2008–09	Saba	Pro League	17	1			5	0		
2009–10	Saba	Pro League	13	0			-	-		
2010–11	Saba	Pro League	31	3	0	0	-	-	31	3
2011–12	Saba	Pro League	2	1	0	0	-	-	2	1
Career total			87	6				0		
