= Davoud Bahadori =

Iranian footballer

Personal information
- Full name: Davoud Bahadori
- Date of birth: 14 January 1994 (age 32)
- Place of birth: Qom, Iran
- Height: 1.76 m (5 ft 9 in)
- Position: Right-back

Youth career
- 2005–2007: Saba
- 2007–2009: Sepahan
- 2010–2013: Saba

Senior career*
Years	Team	Apps	(Gls)
2013–2018	Saba	39	(1)

International career
2009–2010	Iran U17	1	(0)
2011–2012	Iran U20	1	(0)
- * Club domestic league appearances and goals as of 21 September 2021

Davoud Bahadori (Persian: داود بهادری; born 14 January 1994) is an Iranian professional footballer.

== Club career ==
=== Early years ===
Bahadori started his career with Saba. Later he joined Sepahan and spent two seasons with them.

=== Saba ===
He returned to Saba in the winter 2010. He made his debut for Saba Qom against Rah Ahan on September 20, 2013, as a substitute for Majid Houtan. He signed a three-year contract extension on July 1, 2014.

== International career ==
Bahadori represented Iran U17 at the 2010 AFC U-16 Championship. He was a member of Iran U20 from 2011 to 2012.

== Career statistics ==
As of 21 September 2021

Club	Season	League			Hazfi Cup		Total	
Club	Season	Division	Apps	Goals	Apps	Goals	Apps	Goals
Saba	2013–14	Persian Gulf Pro League	1	0	0	0	1	0
Saba	2014–15	Persian Gulf Pro League	4	0	0	0	4	0
Saba	2015–16	Persian Gulf Pro League	9	0	1	0	10	0
Saba	2016–17	Persian Gulf Pro League	8	0	0	0	8	0
Saba	2017–18	Azadegan League	17	1	0	0	17	1
Career total			39	1	1	0	40	1
