= Baadraan Tehran F.C. =

Iranian football club

Baadraan بادران
- Full name: Baadraan Tehran Football Club
- Founded: 1 July 2015; 10 years ago
- Dissolved: 2021
- Ground: Kargaran Stadium
- Capacity: 5,000
- Owner: Baadraan Gostar Company
- Chairman: Shohreh Mousavi
- Head Coach: Omid Ravankhah
- League: Azadegan League
- 2020–21: Azadegan League, 3rd
- Website: http://baadraanfc.ir/
| Home colours | Away colours |

Baadraan Tehran Football Club (Persian: باشگاه فوتبال بادران تهران, Bashgah-e Futbal-e Badran Tehran), commonly known as Baadraan, is an Iranian football club based in Tehran, that competes in the Azadegan League. The club was founded in 2015.

The football team plays their home games at the Kargaran Stadium which has a capacity of 5,000. The club is owned and supported by the Baadraan Gostar Company.

== History ==
=== Establishment ===
The club was founded by the Baadraan Gostar Company on 1 July 2015. They played their first year in League 2. Baadraan finished third in that season.

=== Azadegan League ===
After playing one season in League 2 the club showed interest for buying the licence of Naft Tehran in Persian Gulf Pro League. However Baadraan bought the licence of Parseh Tehran in Azadegan League in June 2016.

== Stadium ==
The football team played their home games in their first season at the Vezarat Kar Stadium which has a seating capacity of 5,000. Since July 2016 Baadraan plays their home games at the Kargaran Stadium which has a capacity of 5,000. The stadium was formerly used by Parseh Tehran. Baadraan played also some home matches in the 2016–17 Azadegan League season at Ekbatan.

== Seasons ==
The table below chronicles the achievements of Baadraan in various competitions since 2015.

| Season | Division | League | Position | Hazfi Cup | Notes |
|---|---|---|---|---|---|
| 2015–16 | 3 | League 2 | 3rd (Group B) | Round of 32 | Promoted |
| 2016–17 | 2 | Azadegan League | 5th | Round of 32 |
| 2017–18 | 2 | Azadegan League | 5th | Round of 16 |
| 2018-19 | 2 | Azadegan League | 7th | Third Round |
| 2019-20 | 2 | Azadegan League | 5th | Fourth Round |
| 2020-21 | 2 | Azadegan League | 3rd | Third Round | Disbanded |

Notes:
The Persian Gulf Pro League was formerly known as Iran Pro League (IPL) and Persian Gulf Cup (PGC)
The Azadegan League was the highest league between 1991 and 2001
The League 2 was formerly known as Iran Football's 2nd Division
The League 3 was formerly known as Iran Football's 3rd Division

== Players ==
=== First team squad ===
As of 7 July 2019.

Note: Flags indicate national team as defined under FIFA eligibility rules; some limited exceptions apply. Players may hold more than one non-FIFA nationality.

| No. | Pos. | Nation | Player |
|---|---|---|---|
| 50 | GK | IRN | Shahab Adeli^{U25} |
| 64 | GK | IRN | Mehrdad Tahmasbi |
| 81 | GK | IRN | Farzad Tayebi Pour |
| 3 | DF | IRN | Pourya Seifpanahi |
| 4 | DF | IRN | Pouya Asadi |
| 14 | DF | IRN | Mohsen Hosseini |
| 8 | MF | IRN | Ali Akbar Farhang |
| 9 | MF | IRN | Reza Najjari |
| 10 | FW | IRN | Karim Eslami |
| 11 | MF | IRN | Kianoush Mirzaei |
| 12 | GK | IRN | Farzad Tayebipour |
| 13 | DF | IRN | Navid Moradkhani |
| 14 | MF | IRN | Shahab Karami |
| 16 | FW | IRN | Fardin Najafi |
| 17 | MF | IRN | Pouria Pashazadeh |
| 18 | MF | IRN | Bahador Dolati |
| 19 | FW | IRN | Hossein Zamehran |
| 20 | DF | IRN | Meysam Majidi |

| No. | Pos. | Nation | Player |
|---|---|---|---|
| 21 | DF | IRN | Erfan Badi |
| 22 | GK | IRN | Alireza Salimi |
| 23 | FW | IRN | Iman Gholami |
| 27 | DF | IRN | Mehrdad Khaledi |
| 28 | DF | IRN | Jahanbakhsh Zabihi Taher |
| 30 | FW | IRN | Sadegh Pakghadam |
| 33 | DF | IRN | Saber Khoshnam |
| 44 | MF | IRN | Hossein Baharvand |
| 55 | DF | IRN | Mohammad Rahbar |
| 69 | FW | IRN | Mohammad Ali Akbarkhah |
| 70 | FW | IRN | Ahmad Jabouri |
| 77 | DF | IRN | Oveis Kordjahan |
| 80 | MF | IRN | Nima Moazenizadeh |
| 87 | FW | IRN | Ali Asghar Ramezani |
| 88 | MF | IRN | Vahid Aliabadi |
| 99 | FW | IRN | Mojtaba Mahboob Mojaz |
| — | MF | IRN | Ali Khosravi |

For recent transfers, see List of Iranian football transfers summer 2016.

== Coaches ==
=== Coaches since 2015 ===
| No. | Coach | from | until |
|---|---|---|---|
| 1 | (Iran) Mohammad Rabiei | 1 July 2015 | 30 June 2016 |
| 2 | (Iran) Akbar Misaghian | 1 July 2016 | |

== Sponsorship ==
| Period | Kit manufacturer | Sponsor |
|---|---|---|
| 2015–16 | Uhlsport | Baadraan Gostar Company |
| 2016–17 | Yousef Jame | Baadraan Gostar Company |

== See also ==
- 2016–17 Azadegan League
