= List of Iranian football transfers summer 2010 =

This is a list of Iranian football transfers for the 2010 summer transfer window. Only moves featuring at least one Iran Pro League or Azadegan League club are listed.

The summer transfer window opened on 23 May 2010 and will close at midnight on 27 July 2010. Players without a club may join one at any time, either during or in between transfer windows. Clubs can also sign players on loan at any point during the season. If need be, clubs may sign a goalkeeper on an emergency loan, if all others are unavailable.

== Iran Pro League ==
=== Esteghlal ===
In: Note: Flags indicate national team as defined under FIFA eligibility rules; some limited exceptions apply. Players may hold more than one non-FIFA nationality.

No.	Pos.	Nation	Player
16	DF	BRA	André Luiz (from (Brazil) Paraná)
31	DF	IRI	Javad Shirzad (from Foolad)
17	MF	IRI	Farzad Ashoubi (from Mes Kerman)
20	MF	BRA	Felipe Alves (from Malavan)
32	MF	IRI	Iman Mobali (from (United Arab Emirates) Al Nasr)
37	MF	IRI	Esmaeil Sharifat (from Esteghlal Ahvaz)
10	FW	IRI	Milad Meydavoudi (from Esteghlal Ahvaz)
11	FW	BRA	Anderson (from (South Korea) FC Seoul)

Out: Note: Flags indicate national team as defined under FIFA eligibility rules; some limited exceptions apply. Players may hold more than one non-FIFA nationality.

No.	Pos.	Nation	Player
31	GK	IRI	Iman Sadeghi (to Steel Azin)
2	DF	IRI	Khosro Heydari (to Sepahan)
4	MF	IRI	Hossein Kazemi (to Steel Azin)
16	MF	IRI	Hashem Beikzadeh (to Sepahan)
19	MF	IRI	Mehran Noorafkan (released, to Bargh Shiraz)
21	MF	IRI	Milad Nouri (to Esteghlal Ahvaz)
28	MF	PER	Rinaldo Cruzado (to (Peru) Juan Aurich)
37	MF	BRA	Fábio Januário (to Sepahan)
--	MF	IRI	Mohammad Sadegh Barani (to Rah Ahan)
10	FW	IRI	Siavash Akbarpour (to Steel Azin)

=== Foolad ===
In: Note: Flags indicate national team as defined under FIFA eligibility rules; some limited exceptions apply. Players may hold more than one non-FIFA nationality.

No.	Pos.	Nation	Player
17	FW	IRI	Mehdi Momeni (from Nassaji Mazandaran)
18	GK	IRI	Misagh Memarzadeh (from Persepolis)
20	DF	IRI	Omid Khouraj (from Pas Hamedan)
8	MF	IRI	Reza Magholi (from Esteghlal Ahvaz)
10	MF	IRI	Reza Norouzi (from Steel Azin)
6	MF	IRI	Meysam Khosravi (from Steel Azin)
22	GK	IRI	Alireza Salimi (from Foolad Yazd)
9	FW	IRI	Ruhollah Bigdeli (from Mes)
13	MF	BRA	Andrezinho (from (Serbia) FK Borac Čačak)

Out: Note: Flags indicate national team as defined under FIFA eligibility rules; some limited exceptions apply. Players may hold more than one non-FIFA nationality.

No.	Pos.	Nation	Player
30	GK	IRI	Hossein Ashena (Released, to Naft Tehran)
9	FW	IRI	Sajjad Feizollahi (Released, to Naft Tehran)
12	MF	IRI	Amir Afravi (Released)
21	MF	IRI	Amir Khodamoradi (Released, to Shahrdari Bandar Abbas)
27	DF	IRI	Masoud Armoun (Released)
19	MF	BIH	Mladen Bartolović (Released, to (Croatia) HNK Cibalia)
33	GK	IRI	Saeed Moradi (Released)
22	GK	IRI	Abolfazl Bahadorani (Released, to Naft Ahvaz)
25	MF	IRI	Payam Hajinajaf (Released)
10	MF	IRI	Hojat Zadmahmoud (Released, to Gostaresh Foolad)
28	FW	IRI	Lefteh Hamidi (Released, to Naft Ahvaz)
15	DF	IRI	Mohammad Alavi (Released, to Gostaresh Foolad)
20	DF	IRI	Nader Ahmadi (to Pas Hamedan)
6	MF	IRQ	Abdul-Wahab Abu Al-Hail (Released)
13	DF	IRI	Javad Shirzad (to Esteghlal)
8	FW	IRI	Gholamreza Rezaei (to Persepolis)
18	FW	URU	Cristian Yeladian (Released, to (Brazil) Juventude)

=== Malavan ===
In: Note: Flags indicate national team as defined under FIFA eligibility rules; some limited exceptions apply. Players may hold more than one non-FIFA nationality.

No.	Pos.	Nation	Player
4	DF	IRI	Alireza Jarahkar (from Shirin Faraz)
1	GK	IRI	Ali Hasani Sefat (from Petrochimi Tabriz)
—	GK	IRI	Masoud Poormohamad (from Mehrkam Pars)
25	FW	IRI	Mehdi Daghagheleh (from Esteghlal Ahvaz)
37	FW	IRI	Mohsen Mosalman (from Zob Ahan F.C.)
—	MF	IRI	Hamidreza Divsalar (from Gostaresh Foolad)
—	MF	IRI	Hadi Dehghani (from Aluminium Hormozgan)
7	MF	IRI	Mohammad Hamrang (from Saba Qom)

Out: Note: Flags indicate national team as defined under FIFA eligibility rules; some limited exceptions apply. Players may hold more than one non-FIFA nationality.

No.	Pos.	Nation	Player
1	GK	IRI	Sajjad Biranvand (to iranjavan)
30	MF	BRA	Felipe Alves (to Esteghlal)
10	FW	IRI	Jalal Rafkhaei (to Zob Ahan)
--	MF	IRI	Mohammad Chamandoost (to Sepidrood F.C.)

=== Mes Kerman ===
In: Note: Flags indicate national team as defined under FIFA eligibility rules; some limited exceptions apply. Players may hold more than one non-FIFA nationality.

No.	Pos.	Nation	Player
—	FW	IRI	Alireza Ghadiri (from Tarbiat Yazd)
—	FW	IRI	Rasoul Kor (from Tarbiat Yazd)
—	DF	IRI	Javad Rahimi (from Etka Gorgan)
1	GK	IRI	Ershad Yousefi (from Saba Qom)
40	MF	IRI	Adel Kolahkaj (from Persepolis)
9	MF	IRI	Mehrdad Pouladi (from Tractor Sazi)
—	DF	IRI	Shojai Khalilzadeh (from Mes Rafsanjan)
22	MF	IRI	Ahmad Hasanzadeh (from Mes Sarcheshme)
11	FW	IRI	Keivan Amraei (from Zob Ahan)
7	MF	IRI	Mohammad Mansouri (from Zob Ahan)
4	DF	BRA	Leandro Fernandes Dias (from (Brazil) Americano)
6	DF	IRI	Nabiollah Bagheriha (from Persepolis)

Out: Note: Flags indicate national team as defined under FIFA eligibility rules; some limited exceptions apply. Players may hold more than one non-FIFA nationality.

No.	Pos.	Nation	Player
—	MF	IRI	Mojtaba Ensafi (to Aboomoslem)
—	MF	IRI	Reza Ghanizadeh (to Shahrdari Bandar Abbas)
—	DF	IRI	Shahab Shahdadnejad (to Mes Rafsanjan)
23	DF	BRA	Márcio Giovanini (to Paykan)
12	GK	IRI	Saman Safa (to Pas Hamedan)
2	DF	IRI	Meysam Maniei (to Tractor Sazi)
1	GK	IRI	Abbas Mohammadi (to Tractor Sazi)
9	FW	IRI	Ruhollah Bigdeli (to Foolad)
21	DF	IRI	Hamid Azizzadeh (to Sepahan, Loan Return)
7	MF	IRI	Farzad Ashoubi (to Esteghlal)
20	FW	IRI	Mehdi Rajabzadeh (to Zob Ahan)

=== Naft Tehran ===
In: Note: Flags indicate national team as defined under FIFA eligibility rules; some limited exceptions apply. Players may hold more than one non-FIFA nationality.

No.	Pos.	Nation	Player
25	DF	IRI	Siamak Kouroshi (from Sanati Kaveh)
—	DF	IRI	Omid Alishah (from Nassaji Mazandaran)
30	GK	IRI	Hossein Ashena (from Foolad)
—	MF	IRI	Iman Mousavi (from Moghavemat Sepasi)
—	MF	BRA	Jader da Silva Brazeiro (from (Ukraine) Volyn Lutsk)
17	MF	BRA	Márcio José Narciso (from (Brazil) Ipatinga)
40	DF	IRI	Morteza Izadi (from Saipa)
11	FW	IRI	Bahman Tahmasebi (from Sepahan)
36	FW	IRI	Sajjad Feizollahi (from Foolad)
9	FW	IRI	Akbar Saghiri (from Persepolis)

Out: Note: Flags indicate national team as defined under FIFA eligibility rules; some limited exceptions apply. Players may hold more than one non-FIFA nationality.

No.	Pos.	Nation	Player
—		IRI	Ebrahim Rahmani (released)
—		IRI	Homayoun Geravand (released, to Etka Gorgan)
—		IRI	Mobin Derakhshan (released)
—		IRI	Milad Abdi (released)
—		IRI	Mehdi Rahimi (released)
—		IRI	Hessam Soltani (released)
—		IRI	Mohsen Varzkar (to Bargh Shiraz)
—	FW	IRI	Nima Ghavidel (released)
—		IRI	Amin Rasti (released)
—		IRI	Nima Mohammadikhan (released)
—		IRI	Atabak Namazi (released, to Etka Gorgan)
—	MF	IRI	Keivan Sajedi (released)
—		IRI	Mohammad Savadkoohi (released)
—	GK	TKM	Meksatmyrat Shamuradov (released, to Aboomoslem)

=== PAS Hamedan ===
In: Note: Flags indicate national team as defined under FIFA eligibility rules; some limited exceptions apply. Players may hold more than one non-FIFA nationality.

No.	Pos.	Nation	Player
--	FW	IRI	Hamid Kazemi (from Mehrkam Pars)
1	GK	IRI	Saman Safa (from Mes Kerman)
15	MF	IRI	Mehdi Agha Mohammadi (from Aboomoslem)
21	FW	MLT	Udochukwu Nwoko (from (Cyprus) Doxa Katokopia)
8	MF	IRI	Amir Mohebi (from Tractor Sazi)
20	DF	IRI	Nader Ahmadi (from Foolad)
24	FW	IRI	Hadi Kheiri (from Esteghlal Jonoub)
9	FW	IRI	Farhad Kheirkhah (from Tractor Sazi)
19	DF	IRI	Saeed Lotfi (from Paykan)
7	MF	TJK	Akmal Kholmatov (from (Uzbekistan) Pakhtakor Tashkent)

Out: Note: Flags indicate national team as defined under FIFA eligibility rules; some limited exceptions apply. Players may hold more than one non-FIFA nationality.

No.	Pos.	Nation	Player
23	FW	UZB	Shakhboz Erkinov (to (Uzbekistan) FC Shurtan Guzar)
—	DF	IRI	Saeid Bayat (to Gostaresh Foolad)
7	DF	IRI	Majid Gholamnejad (to Saipa)
6	DF	IRI	Omid Khouraj (to Foolad)
—	MF	IRI	Mohammad Reza Mamani (to Tractor Sazi)
—	DF	IRI	Mansour Ahmadzadeh (to Foolad Yazd)
21	MF	IRI	Vouria Ghafouri (to Shahrdari Tabriz)
18	FW	IRI	Saber Mirghorbani (to Paykan)
9	FW	IRI	Hadi Asghari (to Saba)
40	GK	IRI	Sosha Makani (to Steel Azin)
—	MF	IRI	Oveis Kordjahan (Released, to Aluminium Hormozgan)

=== Paykan ===
In: Note: Flags indicate national team as defined under FIFA eligibility rules; some limited exceptions apply. Players may hold more than one non-FIFA nationality.

No.	Pos.	Nation	Player
--	MF	IRI	Shoayb Amiri (from Shahin Ahvaz)
28	FW	BRA	Ernandes Toretta Junior (from Gol Gohar)
12	MF	IRI	Mostafa Salehi Nejad (from Zob Ahan)
21	FW	IRI	Mohsen Arzani (from Esteghlal Ahvaz)
3	MF	IRI	Rohollah Soltani (from Payam Mashhad)
13	FW	IRI	Saber Mirghorbani (from Pas Hamedan)
18	MF	IRI	Naser Azarkeyvan (from Saipa)
16	MF	IRI	Mohammad Ali Amiri (from Damash Gilan)
1	GK	IRI	Ebrahim Mirzapour (from Saipa)

Out: Note: Flags indicate national team as defined under FIFA eligibility rules; some limited exceptions apply. Players may hold more than one non-FIFA nationality.

No.	Pos.	Nation	Player
23	FW	BRA	Marcelo (to (Greece) Ionikos F.C.)
6	DF	IRI	Saeed Lotfi (to Pas Hamedan)
9	MF	IRI	Mohammad Reza Tahmasebi (Shahrdari Tabriz)
22	GK	IRI	Masoud Gholamalizad (to Saba Qom F.C.)
--	DF	IRI	Hamid Hedayati (to Rah Ahan)
--	FW	IRI	Iman Razaghirad (to Rah Ahan)
26	DF	BRA	Luiz Carlos (released, to (Greece) PAS Giannina F.C.)

=== Persepolis ===
In: Note: Flags indicate national team as defined under FIFA eligibility rules; some limited exceptions apply. Players may hold more than one non-FIFA nationality.

No.	Pos.	Nation	Player
36	GK	IRI	Rahman Ahmadi (from Sepahan)
20	DF	IRI	Alireza Noormohammadi (from Rah Ahan)
9	MF	IRI	Maziar Zare (from (United Arab Emirates) Al Sharjah)
14	MF	IRI	Mohammad Nouri (from Saba Qom)
23	MF	IRI	Amir Hossein Feshangchi (from Saba Qom)
10	FW	IRI	Gholamreza Rezaei (from Foolad)
33	FW	BFA	Hervé Oussalé (from (Belgium) RAEC Mons)

Out: Note: Flags indicate national team as defined under FIFA eligibility rules; some limited exceptions apply. Players may hold more than one non-FIFA nationality.

No.	Pos.	Nation	Player
1	GK	IRI	Misagh Memarzadeh (to Foolad)
33	GK	IRI	Mohammad Hossein Naeiji (Released, to Etka Gorgan)
5	DF	IRI	Nabiollah Bagheriha (to Mes Kerman)
12	DF	IRI	Ziaeddin Niknafs (to Sanat Naft Abadan F.C.)
10	MF	IRI	Maysam Baou (to Shahrdari Tabriz)
21	MF	IRQ	Hawar Mulla Mohammed Taher Zebari (Released)
40	MF	IRI	Adel Kolahkaj (to Mes Kerman)
9	FW	IRI	Mohsen Khalili (to Steel Azin)
19	FW	IRI	Akbar Saghiri (to Naft Tehran)
28	FW	BRA	Wésley Brasilia de Almeida (Released)
29	FW	IRI	Mehran Farziat (Released)

=== Rah Ahan ===
In: Note: Flags indicate national team as defined under FIFA eligibility rules; some limited exceptions apply. Players may hold more than one non-FIFA nationality.

No.	Pos.	Nation	Player
23	GK	IRI	Hassan Roudbarian (from Tractor Sazi)
--	GK	IRI	Mohammad Saleh Khalil Azad (from Bargh Shiraz)
--	MF	IRI	Meysam Khodashenas (from Tarbiat Yazd)
14	DF	IRI	Maysam Aghaei (from Shensa Arak)
4	DF	IRI	Mirhani Hashemi (from Moghavemat Sepasi)
2	DF	IRI	Hamid Hedayati (from Paykan)
10	MF	IRI	Bahador Abdi (from Shahin Bushehr)
--	MF	IRI	Mehdi Zarei (from Tarbiat Yazd)
22	MF	BRA	Rodrigo Antônio Lopes Belchior (from (Brazil) Sertãozinho)
--	MF	IRI	Mohammad Sadegh Barani (from Esteghlal)
27	FW	IRI	Amin Motevaselzadeh (from Moghavemat Sepasi)
11	FW	IRI	Iman Razaghirad (from Paykan)
15	FW	BRA	Ricardinho (from (Brazil) Brasiliense)

Out: Note: Flags indicate national team as defined under FIFA eligibility rules; some limited exceptions apply. Players may hold more than one non-FIFA nationality.

No.	Pos.	Nation	Player
19	DF	IRI	Javad Keshtkar (Released)
—	FW	IRI	Ahmad Momenzadeh (to Aluminium Hormozgan)
—	FW	IRI	Farid Abedi (to Bargh Shiraz)
31	GK	IRI	Davoud Noshi (to Shahrdari Tabriz)
—	MF	MLI	Issa Traoré (to Sanat Naft Abadan F.C.t)
1	GK	IRI	Masoud Homami (to Shahrdari Tabriz)
9	FW	IRI	Iman Haydari (to Shahin Bushehr)
6	DF	IRI	Alireza Noormohammadi (to Persepolis)
--	MF	IRI	Majid Noormohammadi (to Pas Hamedan)
7	MF	IRI	Milad Zanidpour (to Steel Azin)
40	MF	IRI	Saeid Hallafi (to Persepolis, Loan Return)

=== Saba Qom ===
In: Note: Flags indicate national team as defined under FIFA eligibility rules; some limited exceptions apply. Players may hold more than one non-FIFA nationality.

No.	Pos.	Nation	Player
14	FW	IRI	Farzad Hatami (from Sepahan)
19	MF	IRI	Vahid Hamidinejad (from Aluminium Hormozgan)
18	MF	IRI	Vahid Nemati (from Shamoushak Noshahr)
15	FW	BRA	Wando da Costa Silva (from (Brazil) Águia)
21	DF	IRI	Morteza Hashemizadeh (from Payam Mashhad)
25	FW	BRA	Paulo Almeida (from (Brazil) União Esporte Clube)
--	DF	IRI	Mehdi Fathizadeh (from Etka Gorgan)
22	GK	IRI	Masoud Gholamalizad (from Paykan)
9	FW	IRI	Hadi Asghari (from Pas Hamedan)
20	DF	IRI	Alireza Mirshafian (from Tractor Sazi)
5	MF	IRI	Saeed Khani (from F.C. Aboomoslem)
7	MF	IRI	Alireza Vahedi Nikbakht (from Steel Azin)

Out: Note: Flags indicate national team as defined under FIFA eligibility rules; some limited exceptions apply. Players may hold more than one non-FIFA nationality.

No.	Pos.	Nation	Player
17	FW	IRI	Fereydoon Fazli (to Gostaresh Foolad F.C.)
22	MF	IRI	Mostafa Mahdizadeh (Released, to Shahrdari Bandar Abbas)
—	DF	POL	Andrzej Bednarz (Released)
9	FW	BRA	Diego José Clementino (Released, to (Brazil) América)
--	MF	IRI	Mohammad Hamrang (to Malavan)
--	MF	IRI	Ali Reza Latifi (to Saipa)
--	FW	IRI	Jaber Ansari (to Saipa)
18	GK	IRI	Ershad Yousefi (to Mes Kerman)
15	MF	IRI	Abbas Mohammad Rezaei (to Saipa)
25	DF	IRI	Morteza Assadi (to Tractor Sazi)
14	MF	IRI	Mohammad Nouri (to Persepolis)
23	MF	IRI	Amir Hossein Feshangchi (to Persepolis)

=== Saipa ===
In: Note: Flags indicate national team as defined under FIFA eligibility rules; some limited exceptions apply. Players may hold more than one non-FIFA nationality.

No.	Pos.	Nation	Player
13	MF	IRI	Ali Haghdoost (from Aboomoslem)
--	MF	IRI	Milad Gharibi (from Naft va Gaz)
--	MF	IRI	Naser Azarkeyvan (from Gostaresh, Loan Return)
20	MF	IRI	Ali Reza Latifi (from Saba Qom)
24	FW	IRI	Jaber Ansari (from Saba Qom)
15	MF	IRI	Abbas Mohammad Rezaei (from Saba Qom)
4	DF	IRI	Mostafa Sabri (from Moghavemat Sepasi)
--	FW	IRI	Sajjad Shahbazzadeh (from Zob Ahan Ardebil)

Out: Note: Flags indicate national team as defined under FIFA eligibility rules; some limited exceptions apply. Players may hold more than one non-FIFA nationality.

No.	Pos.	Nation	Player
12	DF	IRI	Ali Hosseini (to Damash Gilan)
7	MF	IRI	Omid Sharifinasab (to Sanat Naft Abadan F.C.)
—	DF	IRI	Morteza Izadi (to Naft Tehran)
—	MF	IRI	Naser Azarkeyvan (released, to Paykan)
—	GK	IRI	Ebrahim Mirzapour (to Paykan)

=== Sanat Naft ===
In: Note: Flags indicate national team as defined under FIFA eligibility rules; some limited exceptions apply. Players may hold more than one non-FIFA nationality.

No.	Pos.	Nation	Player
21	DF	IRI	Mohammad Azizi (from Mes Rafsanjan)
7	MF	IRI	Omid Sharifinasab (from Saipa)
8	MF	IRI	Rasoul Navidkia (from Sepahan Novin)
6	MF	IRI	Ali Mombaini (from Moghavemat Sepasi)
11	MF	MLI	Issa Traoré (from Rah Ahan)
12	MF	IRI	Vahid Paloch (from Shamoushak Noshahr)
3	DF	IRI	Shaban Asadi (from Shamoushak Noshahr)
24	DF	IRI	Ziaeddin Niknafs (from Persepolis)

Out: Note: Flags indicate national team as defined under FIFA eligibility rules; some limited exceptions apply. Players may hold more than one non-FIFA nationality.

No.	Pos.	Nation	Player
—	MF	BRA	Emanoel De Souza (released, to Gostaresh Foolad)
—	DF	IRI	Ghadr Bani Hajar (Long Term Injury)
—	MF	BRA	Gabriel Santana (released)
—	MF	IRI	Iman Poshtareh (released)
—	MF	IRI	Khalil Bachari (released)
—	MF	IRI	Hamid Khafaei (released)
—	MF	BRA	Sandro Gaúcho (released)
—	MF	IRI	Morteza Bargizar (released)
—	DF	IRI	Mohammadreza Jalali (released, to Aboomoslem)
—	MF	IRI	Saeed Pirsarandib (released)
—	DF	IRI	Ali Badavi (released, to Naft Ahvaz)
—	GK	IRI	Ali Asakereh (released)
—	MF	IRI	Hamed Sarlak (released)
—	GK	BRA	Douglas Friedrich (released)
—	DF	IRI	Reza Jalali Sabet (to Esteghlal Ahvaz)

=== Sepahan ===
In: Note: Flags indicate national team as defined under FIFA eligibility rules; some limited exceptions apply. Players may hold more than one non-FIFA nationality.

No.	Pos.	Nation	Player
12	GK	IRI	Mohammad Savari (from Sepahan Novin)
--	DF	IRI	Hamid Azizzadeh (from Mes Kerman, Loan Return)
2	DF	IRI	Khosro Heydari (from Esteghlal)
37	MF	BRA	Fábio Januário (from Esteghlal)
16	MF	IRI	Hashem Beikzadeh (from Esteghlal)
15	MF	IRI	Omid Ebrahimi (from Shahrdari Bandar Abbas)
3	MF	IRI	Mohammad Hassan Rajabzadeh (from Aboomoslem)
22	MF	IRI	Reza Nasehi (from Aboomoslem)
29	FW	SRB	Milorad Janjuš (from (Uzbekistan) Pakhtakor Tashkent)
23	FW	IRI	Javad Kazemian (from (United Arab Emirates) Emirates Club)
21	FW	IRI	Reza Enayati (from (United Arab Emirates) Emirates Club)

Out: Note: Flags indicate national team as defined under FIFA eligibility rules; some limited exceptions apply. Players may hold more than one non-FIFA nationality.

No.	Pos.	Nation	Player
—	MF	IRI	Shayryar Shirvand (to Foolad Natanz)
—	DF	IRI	Hamid Azizzadeh (Released, to Aluminium Hormozgan)
16	DF	IRI	Bahman Tahmasebi (to Naft Tehran)
22	GK	IRI	Rahman Ahmadi (to Persepolis)
21	DF	MOZ	Armando Sá (Released)
30	MF	IRI	Shahin Kheiri (to Zob Ahan)
14	MF	IRI	Ahmad Alenemeh (to Shahin Bushehr F.C.)
40	MF	IRI	Ali Molaei (Released, to Tractor Sazi)
7	FW	IRQ	Emad Ridha (Released, to (Egypt) Zamalek SC)
18	FW	IRI	Farzad Hatami (to Saba Qom)

=== Shahin Bushehr ===
In: Note: Flags indicate national team as defined under FIFA eligibility rules; some limited exceptions apply. Players may hold more than one non-FIFA nationality.

No.	Pos.	Nation	Player
3	DF	CRO	Lek Kcira (from Steel Azin)
19	FW	NGR	Uche Iheruome (from (Uzbekistan) FC Shurtan Guzar)
7	MF	IRI	Sattar Zare (from Bargh Shiraz)
12	DF	IRI	Masoud Nazarzadeh (from Bargh Shiraz F.C.)
23	MF	IRI	Ali Salmani (from Tarbiat Yazd F.C.)
22	GK	IRI	Majid Gholami (from Aboomoslem)
18	MF	IRI	Amjad Shokohmagham (from Aboomoslem)
20	FW	IRI	Iman Haydari (from Rah Ahan)
8	MF	IRI	Sadegh Mohammad Karami (from Moghavemat Sepasi)
4	MF	IRI	Ahmad Alenemeh (from Sepahan)

Out: Note: Flags indicate national team as defined under FIFA eligibility rules; some limited exceptions apply. Players may hold more than one non-FIFA nationality.

No.	Pos.	Nation	Player
—	GK	IRI	Jamal Haghshenas (Released, to Foolad Natanz)
—	GK	IRI	Mohammadreza Amini (Released, to Foolad Natanz)
14	DF	IRI	Hamidreza Soleymani (to Iran Javan)
24	MF	IRI	Amir Hossein Mohammadi (to Mes Rafsanjan)
13	FW	IRQ	Mohammad Nasser Shakroun (Released)
6	FW	IRI	Solyaman Panahi (Released, to Iranjavan)
22	GK	IRI	Hadi Shafei (Released, to Etka Gorgan)
12	MF	NGR	Obaji Sunday (Released, to Iranjavan)
8	MF	IRI	Bahador Abdi (to Rah Ahan)

=== Shahrdari Tabriz ===
In: Note: Flags indicate national team as defined under FIFA eligibility rules; some limited exceptions apply. Players may hold more than one non-FIFA nationality.

No.	Pos.	Nation	Player
22	GK	IRI	Davoud Noshi (from Rah Ahan)
--	MF	IRI	Behnam Beyranvand (from Mes Rafsanjan)
24	MF	BRA	Carlos Eduardo Soares (from (Brazil) Paulínia FC)
20	DF	IRI	Mohsen Neysani (from Moghavemat)
9	MF	IRI	Mohammad Reza Tahmasebi (from Paykan)
1	GK	IRI	Masoud Homami (from Rah Ahan)
7	MF	IRI	Vouria Ghafouri (from Pas Hamedan)
18	MF	IRI	Mohammad Iranpourian (from Moghavemat)
11	FW	IRI	Shahram Goudarzi (from Moghavemat)
8	MF	IRI	Maysam Baou (from Persepolis)
--	DF	BRA	Paulo Cesar Fonseca Nunes (from (Brazil) Novo Hamburgo)

Out: Note: Flags indicate national team as defined under FIFA eligibility rules; some limited exceptions apply. Players may hold more than one non-FIFA nationality.

No.	Pos.	Nation	Player
—	MF	IRI	Hasan Najafi (released)
—	MF	IRI	Abouzar Abdi (released)
—	MF	IRI	Abdollah Shah Hosseini (released)
—	GK	BRA	Geova Azevedo (released, to Gostaresh Foolad)
—	FW	IRI	Sohrab Entezari (released)
—	MF	IRI	Mostafa Mehdizadeh (released, to Shahrdari Bandar Abbas)
—	MF	IRI	Mohsen Giahi (released)
—	DF	IRI	Alireza Jalili (released, to Moghavemat Sepasi)
—	DF	IRI	Saeed Boraghjam (released)
—	GK	SRB	Đorđe Babalj (released)
—	MF	IRI	Mohammad Aghamohammadi (released, to Damash Iranian)
—	DF	HUN	Krisztián Budovinszky (to (Hungary) Diósgyőri VTK)

=== Steel Azin ===
In: Note: Flags indicate national team as defined under FIFA eligibility rules; some limited exceptions apply. Players may hold more than one non-FIFA nationality.

No.	Pos.	Nation	Player
40	GK	IRI	Sosha Makani (from Pas Hamedan)
--	GK	IRI	Iman Sadeghi (from Esteghlal)
3	DF	IRI	Hassan Ashjari (from Zob Ahan)
16	MF	IRI	Milad Zanidpour (from Rah Ahan)
33	MF	IRI	Hossein Kazemi (from Esteghlal)
11	MF	IRI	Mehrzad Madanchi (from (United Arab Emirates) Al-Ahli)
10	FW	IRI	Siavash Akbarpour (from Esteghlal)
17	FW	IRI	Mohsen Khalili (from Persepolis)
29	FW	IRQ	Amjad Radhi (from (Iraq) Al Quwa Al Jawiya)

Out: Note: Flags indicate national team as defined under FIFA eligibility rules; some limited exceptions apply. Players may hold more than one non-FIFA nationality.

No.	Pos.	Nation	Player
—	MF	IRI	Arash Roshanipour (to Aboomoslem)
—	MF	IRI	Ali Azari Karki (Released, to Damash Iranian)
12	MF	IRI	Hamid Reza Sharafi (to Aluminium Hormozgan)
2	DF	CRO	Lek Kcira (to Shahin Bushehr)
3	MF	IRI	Meysam Khosravi (to Foolad F.C.)
22	GK	IRI	Ali Nazarmohammadi (Released)
11	MF	IRI	Mohammad Reza Mahdavi (Released, to Damash Gilan)
10	FW	IRI	Afshin Chavoshi (Released, to Damash Gilan)
19	MF	IRI	Omid Shahmoradi (Released)
17	MF	IRI	Reza Norouzi (Released, to Foolad F.C.)
40	MF	IRI	Alireza Vahedi Nikbakht (to Saba Qom)

=== Tractor Sazi ===
In: Note: Flags indicate national team as defined under FIFA eligibility rules; some limited exceptions apply. Players may hold more than one non-FIFA nationality.

No.	Pos.	Nation	Player
9	MF	IRI	Ali Molaei (from Sepahan)
21	FW	IRI	Ali Alizadeh (from Bargh Shiraz)
2	MF	IRI	Mohammad Sadegh Taheri (from Damash Iranian)
—	MF	IRI	Mohammad Reza Mamani (from Pas Hamedan)
23	DF	IRI	Meysam Maniei (from Mes Kerman)
19	FW	IRI	Davoud Daneshdoost (from Aboomoslem)
10	FW	IRI	Rasoul Khatibi (from Gostaresh Foolad)
1	GK	IRI	Abbas Mohammadi (from Mes Kerman)
8	DF	IRI	Morteza Assadi (from Saba Qom)
--	--	IRI	Bahram Dabagh (from Youth Team)
24	MF	IRI	Mohammad Lotfi (from Youth Team)
--	--	IRI	Hasan Abhari (from Youth Team)
--	--	IRI	Saman Nariman (from Youth Team)

Out: Note: Flags indicate national team as defined under FIFA eligibility rules; some limited exceptions apply. Players may hold more than one non-FIFA nationality.

No.	Pos.	Nation	Player
1	GK	IRI	Hassan Roudbarian (to Rah Ahan)
8	DF	IRI	Mehrdad Pouladi (to Mes Kerman)
--	FW	IRI	Amir Mohebi (to Pas Hamedan F.C.)
4	DF	IRI	Alireza Mirshafian (to Saba Qom)
9	FW	IRI	Farhad Kheirkhah (to Pas Hamedan)

=== Zob Ahan ===
In: Note: Flags indicate national team as defined under FIFA eligibility rules; some limited exceptions apply. Players may hold more than one non-FIFA nationality.

No.	Pos.	Nation	Player
--	DF	IRI	Hossein Mahini (from Esteghlal Ahvaz)
--	DF	BRA	Vinicius Julianetti Evandro (from (France) Rodez AF)
--	MF	IRI	Shahin Kheiri (from Sepahan)
--	MF	IRI	Majid Noormohammadi (from PAS Hamedan)
30	FW	IRI	Mehdi Rajabzadeh (from Mes Kerman)
--	FW	IRI	Jalal Rafkhaei (from Malavan)

Out: Note: Flags indicate national team as defined under FIFA eligibility rules; some limited exceptions apply. Players may hold more than one non-FIFA nationality.

No.	Pos.	Nation	Player
—	MF	IRI	Jalal Omidian (to Foolad Natanz)
18	MF	IRI	Babak Razi (to Nassaji Mazandaran)
6	DF	IRI	Mostafa Salehi Nejad (to Paykan)
8	DF	IRI	Hassan Ashjari (to Steel Azin)
7	MF	IRI	Mohammad Mansouri (to Mes Kerman)
13	MF	ARG	Gabriel Iribarren (Released)
16	MF	IRI	Mohsen Mosalman (to Malavan)
11	FW	IRI	Keivan Amraei (to Mes Kerman)

== Azadegan League ==
=== Aboomoslem ===
In: Note: Flags indicate national team as defined under FIFA eligibility rules; some limited exceptions apply. Players may hold more than one non-FIFA nationality.

No.	Pos.	Nation	Player
—	DF	IRI	Mohammadreza Jalali (from Sanat Naft Abadan F.C.)
—	MF	PAK	Adnan Ahmed (from (Hungary) Ferencvárosi)
—	MF	IRI	Mojtaba Ensafi (from Mes Kerman)
—	FW	MLI	Makan Dembélé (from Gostaresh)
—	DF	IRI	Ebrahim Assadi (from Nassaji Mazandaran)
—	DF	IRI	Mansour Jamalian (from Payam Mashhad)
—	FW	IRI	Hamidreza Zohani (from Unattached)
—	FW	IRI	Ehsan Khorsandi (from Damash Iranian)
12	FW	IRI	Mohammad Gholamin (from Payam Mashhad)

Out: Note: Flags indicate national team as defined under FIFA eligibility rules; some limited exceptions apply. Players may hold more than one non-FIFA nationality.

No.	Pos.	Nation	Player
—	MF	IRI	Farshad Bahadorani (from Moghavemat Sepasi)
12	FW	IRI	Younes Shakeri (to Moghavemat Sepasi)
26	MF	IRI	Davoud Seyed Abbasi (to Aluminium Hormozgan)
—	MF	BRA	Gabriel Schacht (Released, to (Brazil) São Raimundo)
—	MF	IRI	Maysam Hajian (to Shahrdari Bandar Abbas)
--	FW	IRI	Mehdi Agha Mohammadi (from Aboomoslem)
—	DF	IRI	Ebrahim Lovinian (to Damash Gilan)
—	GK	IRI	Majid Gholami (to Shahin Bushehr)
5	MF	IRI	Amjad Shokohmagham (to Shahin Bushehr)
30	DF	TOG	Abdou Moumouni (Released)
14	FW	IRI	Davoud Daneshdoost (to Tractor Sazi)
25	FW	BRA	Gelson (Released)
—	MF	IRI	Ali Haghdoost (to Saipa)
--	MF	IRI	Saeed Khani (from F.C. Aboomoslem)
--	MF	IRI	Mohammad Hassan Rajabzadeh (to Sepahan)
--	MF	IRI	Reza Nasehi (to Sepahan)

=== Aluminium Hormozgan ===
In: Note: Flags indicate national team as defined under FIFA eligibility rules; some limited exceptions apply. Players may hold more than one non-FIFA nationality.

No.	Pos.	Nation	Player
22	DF	IRI	Maysam Majidi (from Shensa Arak)
—	MF	IRI	Mehrdad Avakh (from Shahrdari Bandar Abass)
—	DF	IRI	Hamid Azizzadeh (from Sepahan)
12	MF	IRI	Ahmad Momenzadeh (from Rah Ahan)
—	FW	CMR	William Biyitti (from Shirin Faraz)
—	MF	IRI	Hamid Reza Sharafi (from Steel Azin)
—	MF	IRI	Davoud Seyed Abbasi (from Aboomoslem)
—	MF	IRI	Oveis Kordjahan (from Pas Hamedan)
—	MF	IRI	Yasha Khalili (from Mes Rafsanjan)
—	FW	ROU	Marian Tănasă (from (Romania) FC Baia Mare)

Out: Note: Flags indicate national team as defined under FIFA eligibility rules; some limited exceptions apply. Players may hold more than one non-FIFA nationality.

No.	Pos.	Nation	Player
—		IRI	Hamed Amirkhani (to Sanati Kaveh)
—		IRI	Mojtaba Babak (to Sanati Kaveh)
21		IRI	Akbar Sadeghi (from Sanati Kaveh)
16		IRI	Abdolfazl Ebrahimi (to Sanati Kaveh)
3		IRI	Vahid Hamidinejad (to Saba Qom F.C.)
11		IRI	Hadi Dehghani (to Malavan F.C.)
27	MF	ALB	Arsim Plepolli (Released)
—		IRI	Adnan Delfi (to Sanat Sari)

=== Bargh Shiraz ===
In: Note: Flags indicate national team as defined under FIFA eligibility rules; some limited exceptions apply. Players may hold more than one non-FIFA nationality.

No.	Pos.	Nation	Player
—		IRI	Javad Zarei (from Payam Mokhaberat)
—	FW	IRI	Nasir Zarei (from Foolad Novin)
—	GK	IRI	Ali Assadi (from Payam Mokhaberat)
—		IRI	Mehran Noorafkan (from Esteghlal)
—		IRI	Kazem Hayatmanesh (from Payam Mokhaberat)
—	GK	IRI	Payman Shamlou (from Kowsar)
—		IRI	Mohsen Varzkar (from Naft Tehran)
—	FW	IRI	Farid Abedi (from Rah Ahan)
—	FW	IRI	Soheil Haghshenas (from Sepidrood Rasht)

Out: Note: Flags indicate national team as defined under FIFA eligibility rules; some limited exceptions apply. Players may hold more than one non-FIFA nationality.

No.	Pos.	Nation	Player
—	MF	IRI	Farhad Mohammadi (Released)
—	MF	IRI	Hassan Faraji Moghadam (Released)
—	MF	IRI	Rouzbeh Akbarpour (Released)
—	MF	IRI	Vahid Erami (to Gol Gohar)
—	FW	IRI	Ahmad Khaziravi (from Iranjavan)
—	DF	IRI	Reza Nazarzadeh (from Iranjavan)
—	MF	IRI	Mohsen Nikhah (to Iranjavan)
—	FW	IRI	Ali Alizadeh (to Tractor Sazi)
—	GK	IRI	Mohammad Saleh Khalil Azad (to Rah Ahan)
—	MF	IRI	Hadi Imani (Released)
—	MF	IRI	Ali Peyrovani (Released, to Moghavamat Sepasi)
10	MF	IRI	Sattar Zare (to Shahin Bushehr)
—	DF	IRI	Masoud Nazarzadeh (to Shahin Bushehr)

=== Damash Gilan ===
In: Note: Flags indicate national team as defined under FIFA eligibility rules; some limited exceptions apply. Players may hold more than one non-FIFA nationality.

No.	Pos.	Nation	Player
8	DF	IRI	Alireza Niknazar (from Nassaji Mazandaran)
—	MF	IRI	Milad Torabi (from Damash Lorestan)
24	FW	MNE	Admir Adrović (from (Montenegro) FK Sutjeska Nikšić)
3	DF	IRI	Ali Hosseini (from Saipa)
17	DF	IRI	Ebrahim Lovinian (from Aboomoslem)
2	DF	IRI	Ali Mohamad Dehghan (from Moghavemat Sepasi)
11	MF	IRI	Mohammad Reza Mahdavi (from Steel Azin)
10	FW	IRI	Afshin Chavoshi (from Steel Azin)
30	GK	MNE	Miloš Radanović (from (Montenegro) FK Rudar Pljevlja)
1	GK	IRI	Ali Nazarmohammadi (from Steel Azin)
15	MF	IRI	Behnam Afsheh (from Moghavemat Sepasi)
—	DF	IRI	Iman Golalizadeh (from Shirin Faraz)
—	FW	IRI	Arman Dadashzadeh (from Youth Team)
26	MF	IRI	Mehrgan Golbarg (from Youth Team)
—		IRI	Sadegh Pourmohammad (from Youth Team)
—		IRI	Hossein Gohari (from Youth Team)
—		IRI	Mojtaba Farzam (from Youth Team)

Out: Note: Flags indicate national team as defined under FIFA eligibility rules; some limited exceptions apply. Players may hold more than one non-FIFA nationality.

No.	Pos.	Nation	Player
9	MF	IRI	Hossein Maleki (Released, to Chooka Talesh F.C.)
11	FW	IRI	Reza Taheri (Released, to Moghavemat Sepasi)
40	GK	CRO	Tomislav Vranjić (Released)
22	MF	IRI	Shahin Shafie (to Gostaresh Foolad)
1	GK	IRI	Mohsen Forouzanfar (to Gostaresh Foolad)
21	DF	IRI	Mohammad Siah (Released)
4	MF	IRI	Amir Azhari (to Hamyari)
3	DF	IRI	Taghi Ghasemzadeh (to Tarbiat Yazd)
26	FW	IRI	Hamed Abedi (Released)
--	DF	IRI	Milad Shadmand (Released)
--	FW	IRI	Mehdi Aghazadeh (Released)
—	FW	IRI	Hamed Kianirad (to Tarbiat Yazd)
14	FW	IRI	Habib Shakeri (to Tarbiat Yazd)
—	GK	IRI	Hamed Tabatabaei (to Payam Mashhad)
6	MF	IRI	Mostafa Haghipour (to Tractor Sazi)
2	DF	IRI	Siamak Farahani (Released)
5	DF	IRI	Reza Aghamohammadi (Released, to Damash Karaj)
7	FW	IRI	Mohsen Rasouli (Released)
17	MF	IRI	Masoud Abtahi (Released)
19	MF	IRI	Ali Ghasemian (Released)

=== Damash Lorestan ===
In: Note: Flags indicate national team as defined under FIFA eligibility rules; some limited exceptions apply. Players may hold more than one non-FIFA nationality.

No.	Pos.	Nation	Player
—	GK	IRI	Mahmoud Bahreini (from Iranjavan)
—	MF	IRI	Mohammad Aghamohammadi (from Shahrdari Tabriz)
—	MF	MKD	Vlatko Grozdanoski (from (Cyprus) AEL Limassol)
—	GK	BIH	Boris Bačak (from (Bosnia and Herzegovina) NK Široki Brijeg)
—	MF	IRI	Ali Azari Karki (from Steel Azin)

Out: Note: Flags indicate national team as defined under FIFA eligibility rules; some limited exceptions apply. Players may hold more than one non-FIFA nationality.

No.	Pos.	Nation	Player
—	MF	IRI	Bahman Dastani (to Payam Mokhaberat)
—	MF	IRI	Jafar Bazri (to Foolad Yazd)
—	GK	BRA	Joseph Mendez (to Damash Karaj)
—	FW	IRI	Ehsan Khorsandi (to Aboomoslem)
—		IRI	Farokh Yavari (to Payam Mashhad)
—	MF	SRB	Ivan Dragičević (Released)
—	MF	IRI	Mohammad Sadegh Taheri (to Tractor Sazi)
—	MF	SRB	Dušan Petronijević (Released)
—	MF	IRI	Milad Torabi (to Damash Iranian)

=== Esteghlal Ahvaz ===
In: Note: Flags indicate national team as defined under FIFA eligibility rules; some limited exceptions apply. Players may hold more than one non-FIFA nationality.

No.	Pos.	Nation	Player
—	FW	IRI	Mojahed Khaziravi (from Unattached)
—	DF	IRI	Reza Jalali Sabet (from Sanat Naft Abadan F.C.)
--	MF	IRI	Milad Nouri (from Esteghlal)

Out: Note: Flags indicate national team as defined under FIFA eligibility rules; some limited exceptions apply. Players may hold more than one non-FIFA nationality.

No.	Pos.	Nation	Player
—	FW	IRI	Amir Khalifeasl (from Shahrdari Bandar Abass)
—	FW	IRI	Mostafa Bijani (to Shahrdari Bandar Abass)
12	GK	IRI	Nader Ghobishavi (to Shahrdari Bandar Abass)
21	FW	IRI	Mohsen Arzani (to Paykan)
17	FW	IRI	Mehdi Daghagheleh (to Malavan F.C.)
24	MF	IRI	Javad Razzaghi (to Shahrdari Bandar Abbas)
20	MF	IRI	Hamidreza Rajabi (to Shahrdari Bandar Abbas)
—	MF	IRI	Reza Magholi (to Foolad)
5	DF	IRI	Hossein Mahini (to Zob Ahan)
11	MF	IRI	Esmaeil Sharifat (to Esteghlal)
10	FW	IRI	Milad Meydavoudi (to Esteghlal)

=== Etka Gorgan ===
In: Note: Flags indicate national team as defined under FIFA eligibility rules; some limited exceptions apply. Players may hold more than one non-FIFA nationality.

No.	Pos.	Nation	Player
—	MF	IRI	Hamid Nemati (from Shamoushak)
—	GK	IRI	Mohammad Hossein Naeiji (from Persepolis)
--	MF	IRI	Ramin Mohammadpour (from Petrochimi Tabriz)
22	GK	IRI	Hadi Shafei (from Shahin Bushehr)
—		IRI	Atabak Namazi (from Naft Tehran)
—		IRI	Homayoun Geravand (from Naft Tehran)
—	MF	IRI	Ahad Shabani (from Gostaresh Foolad)
—		IRI	Mohammad Gorji (from Gol Gohar)

Out: Note: Flags indicate national team as defined under FIFA eligibility rules; some limited exceptions apply. Players may hold more than one non-FIFA nationality.

No.	Pos.	Nation	Player
—	DF	IRI	Omid Khalili (to Moghavemat)
—	GK	IRI	Mehrdad Tahmasbi (Released, to Nassaji Mazandaran)
—		IRI	Mehran Radmehr (Released)
—	DF	IRI	Esmaeil Bale (Released, to Sanat Sari)
—	DF	IRI	Saeed Fakhraeipour (Released)
—		IRI	Mohammad Gharib (Released, to Sanat Sari)
—	GK	CMR	Alphonsé Assa (Released)
—	DF	IRI	Javad Rahimi (to Mes Kerman)
—	DF	IRI	Mehdi Fathizadeh (to Saba Qom)

=== Foolad Natanz ===
In: Note: Flags indicate national team as defined under FIFA eligibility rules; some limited exceptions apply. Players may hold more than one non-FIFA nationality.

No.	Pos.	Nation	Player
—	MF	IRI	Shayryar Shirvand (from Sepahan)
—	MF	IRI	Sajad abarghouei Nejad (from Sepahan)
—	MF	IRI	Yaser Mirfendereski (from Iranjavan)
—	MF	IRI	Jalal Omidian (from Zob Ahan)
—	MF	IRI	Jamal Haghshenas (from Shahin Bushehr)
—	GK	IRI	Mohammadreza Amini (Shahin Bushehr)

Out: Note: Flags indicate national team as defined under FIFA eligibility rules; some limited exceptions apply. Players may hold more than one non-FIFA nationality.

No.	Pos.	Nation	Player
—		IRI	Mahmood Ebrahimi (Released)
—	FW	IRI	Hamed Rasouli (Released)
—	MF	IRI	Masoud Giahchian (Released)
—	MF	IRI	Mehrdad Shahnazari (Released)
—		IRI	Mohammad Hamzei (Released)
—		IRI	Mojtaba Saedi (Released)
—	MF	IRI	Mohsen Mousavi (Released)
—		IRI	Sajjad Azhdar (Released)
—		IRI	Mohammad Bani Hashem (Released)
—	DF	IRI	Mohammadreza Zare (Released)
—	MF	IRI	Ehsan Abdollahi (Released)
—		IRI	Ali Shafiei (Released)
—		IRI	Esmaeil Karimian (Released)
—		IRI	Darius Salehpour (Released)
—		IRI	Pouria Khashayari (Released)
—		IRI	Moslem Salehifard (Released)
—		IRI	Vafa Hakhamaneshi (Released)
—	GK	IRI	Hamid Abbasi (Released)
—		IRI	Nima Vatarian (Released)
—	GK	IRI	Mohammad Savari (Released)
—		IRI	Mehdi Nasiri (Released)
12	GK	IRI	Mohammad Savari (to Sepahan)
—	MF	IRI	Rasoul Navidkia (to Sanat Naft Abadan F.C.)

=== Foolad Yazd ===
In: Note: Flags indicate national team as defined under FIFA eligibility rules; some limited exceptions apply. Players may hold more than one non-FIFA nationality.

No.	Pos.	Nation	Player
—	DF	IRI	Mehdi Ghodoosi (from Mes Sarcheshme)
—		IRI	Ramin Farman-Ara (from Mes Sarcheshme)
—	DF	IRI	Mansour Ahmadzadeh (from Pas Hamedan)
—		IRI	Iman Nokhodsaz (from Tarbiat yazd)
—	MF	IRI	Jafar Bazri (from Damash Iranian)
—	MF	TOG	Kassim Guyazou (from Gostaresh Foolad)

Out: Note: Flags indicate national team as defined under FIFA eligibility rules; some limited exceptions apply. Players may hold more than one non-FIFA nationality.

No.	Pos.	Nation	Player
—	GK	IRI	Alireza Salimi (to Foolad)

=== Gol Gohar ===
In: Note: Flags indicate national team as defined under FIFA eligibility rules; some limited exceptions apply. Players may hold more than one non-FIFA nationality.

No.	Pos.	Nation	Player
—	GK	TKM	Meksatmyrat Shamuradov (from Naft Tehran)
—		IRI	Majid Salehi (from Payam Mokhaberat)
—	MF	IRI	Vahid Erami (from Bargh Shiraz)
—	MF	IRI	Mohammed Mirza Seyedi (from Shirin Faraz)
—	FW	IRI	Pourya Darekeh (from Shirin Faraz)
—	MF	IRI	Reza Moslemzadeh (from Nassaji Mazandaran)
—	GK	IRI	Mohammad Khazaei (from Shirin Faraz)

Out: Note: Flags indicate national team as defined under FIFA eligibility rules; some limited exceptions apply. Players may hold more than one non-FIFA nationality.

No.	Pos.	Nation	Player
—	MF	IRI	Majid Ghadimi (to Aboomoslem)
—	GK	IRI	Reza Ataei (to Sanat Sari)
—		IRI	Mohammad Gorji (to Etka Gorgan)
—	MF	IRI	Hossein Aghaei (to Payam Mashhad)

=== Gostaresh Foolad ===
In: Note: Flags indicate national team as defined under FIFA eligibility rules; some limited exceptions apply. Players may hold more than one non-FIFA nationality.

No.	Pos.	Nation	Player
—	DF	IRI	Reza Sharif (from Mes Sarcheshme)
—	MF	IRI	Shahin Shafie (to Gostaresh Foolad)
—	MF	IRI	Rasoul Zamani (from Petrochimi Tabriz)
—	GK	IRI	Mohsen Forouzanfar (from Damash Gilan)
—	MF	BRA	Emanoel De Souza (from Sanat Naft Abadan F.C.)
—	GK	IRI	Ali Asadi (from Mehrkam Pars)
—	FW	IRI	Alireza Teynia (from Mehrkam Pars)
—	FW	IRI	Faraj Lotfi (from Mehrkam Pars)
—	FW	IRI	Mostafa Chatrabgoon (from Moghavemat Sepasi)
—	MF	IRI	Hojat Zadmahmoud (from Foolad)
—	MF	IRI	Hossein Ahmadlou (from Shensa)
—	DF	IRI	Saeid Bayat (from Pas Hamadan)
—	DF	IRI	Mohammad Alavi (from Foolad)
—	FW	IRI	Fereydoon Fazli (from Saba Qom)
—	MF	IRI	Asghar Nadali (from Nassaji Mazandaran)
—	GK	BRA	Geova Azevedo (from Shahrdari Tabriz)
—	MF	IRI	Farzad Majidi (from free agent)

Out: Note: Flags indicate national team as defined under FIFA eligibility rules; some limited exceptions apply. Players may hold more than one non-FIFA nationality.

No.	Pos.	Nation	Player
34	MF	BRA	Silas Feitosa (Released)
—	MF	IRI	Omid Nezamipour (Released)
—	MF	IRI	Amir Nezamipour (Released)
24	DF	CMR	Thomas Manga (Released)
—		IRI	Amir Cheghooresh (Released)
—	DF	IRI	Alireza Ebadi (Released)
—	GK	IRI	Mohammadreza Makarsharg (Released)
—		IRI	Ahmad Rostami (Released)
—		IRI	Yousef Gholami (Released)
—	FW	MLI	Makan Dembélé (to F.C. Aboomoslem)
—	MF	IRI	Javid Yoosefi Shahrokh Abadi (Released)
—	MF	IRI	Mousa Ghorbanpour (Released)
—		IRI	Younes Ghasemi (Released)
—	DF	IRI	Hamed Burbur (to Nassaji Mazandaran)
38	MF	IRI	Naser Azarkeyvan (to Saipa F.C., Loan Return)
—	FW	IRI	Rasoul Khatibi (to Tractor Sazi)
37	MF	IRI	meysam armiyan (to Mes rafsanjan)
—	GK	IRI	Hamed Riahi (Released, to Moghavemat Sepasi)
—	MF	IRI	Mostafa Babazadeh (Released)
28	MF	TOG	Kassim Guyazou (Released, to Foolad Yazd)
—	GK	AZE	Ruslan Medzhidov (Released)
—	MF	IRI	Ahad Shabani (to Etka Gorgan)

=== Hamyari ===
In: Note: Flags indicate national team as defined under FIFA eligibility rules; some limited exceptions apply. Players may hold more than one non-FIFA nationality.

No.	Pos.	Nation	Player
—	MF	IRI	Ali Solaymani (from Petrochimi Tabriz)
—		IRI	Rasoul Sattarpour (from Kowsar)
—		IRI	Farzad Mohammadi (from Kowsar)
—	DF	MLI	Abdoul Karim Coulibaly (from Shahrdari Bandar Abbas)
—	MF	IRI	Amir Azhari (to Hamyari)

Out: Note: Flags indicate national team as defined under FIFA eligibility rules; some limited exceptions apply. Players may hold more than one non-FIFA nationality.

No.	Pos.	Nation	Player
—	MF	IRI	Hossein Ahmadlou (to Gostaresh Foolad)
22	DF	IRI	Maysam Aghaei (to Rah Ahan)
33	FW	BRA	Tiago Cavalcanti (to (Morocco) Wydad Casablanca)
39	FW	HUN	Bela Koplarovics (Released, to (Hungary) Hévíz F.C.)

=== Iran Javan ===
In: Note: Flags indicate national team as defined under FIFA eligibility rules; some limited exceptions apply. Players may hold more than one non-FIFA nationality.

No.	Pos.	Nation	Player
—	FW	IRI	Ahmad Khaziravi (from Bargh Shiraz)
—	FW	IRI	Esmaeil Khazaei (from Shamoushak)
13	DF	IRI	Alireza Zalaki Badil (from Foolad Novin)
—	FW	IRI	Solyaman Panahi (from Shahin Bushehr)
—	DF	IRI	Reza Nazarzadeh (from Bargh Shiraz)
—	MF	NGR	Obaji Sunday (from Shahin Bushehr)
—	MF	IRI	Mohsen Nikhah (from Bargh Shiraz)
2	DF	IRI	Meysam Amiri (from Moghavemat)
—	GK	IRI	Sajjad Biranvand (from Malavan)
19	DF	MLI	Sékou Fofana (from Mes Rafsanjan)
14	DF	IRI	Hamidreza Soleymani (from Shahin Bushehr)

Out: Note: Flags indicate national team as defined under FIFA eligibility rules; some limited exceptions apply. Players may hold more than one non-FIFA nationality.

No.	Pos.	Nation	Player
—	MF	IRI	Ehtesham Sasani (Payam Mokhaberat)
—	MF	IRI	Yaser Mirfendereski (to Foolad Natanz)
—	GK	IRI	Mahmoud Bahreini (to Damash Iranian)
—	FW	IRI	Hakim Hazbavipour (to Tarbiat Yazd)

=== Machine Sazi Tabriz ===
In: Note: Flags indicate national team as defined under FIFA eligibility rules; some limited exceptions apply. Players may hold more than one non-FIFA nationality.

No.	Pos.	Nation	Player
3	MF	IRI	Mohammad Shojah (from Petrochimi Tabriz)
—	GK	IRI	Alireza Naseh Garamaleki (from Petrochimi Tabriz)
—	MF	IRI	Mohammadreza Faramarzi (from Petrochimi Tabriz)
—	FW	NGR	Abraham Adelaja (from Mes Sarcheshme)
—		IRI	Sajjad Erfani (from Mes Sarcheshme)

Out: Note: Flags indicate national team as defined under FIFA eligibility rules; some limited exceptions apply. Players may hold more than one non-FIFA nationality.

No.	Pos.	Nation	Player
--	MF	IRI	Ramin Mohammadpour (to Etka Gorgan)
—	MF	IRI	Massoud Abedi (to Payam Mashhad)
4	MF	BIH	Boris Raspudić (to (Bosnia and Herzegovina) Borac Banja Luka)
—	GK	IRI	Seyed Ali Hosseini (to Malavan)

=== Mes Rafsanjan ===
In: Note: Flags indicate national team as defined under FIFA eligibility rules; some limited exceptions apply. Players may hold more than one non-FIFA nationality.

No.	Pos.	Nation	Player
—	FW	COL	Edison Fonseca (from (Indonesia) Pelita Jaya)(
—	MF	IRI	Hosein Salami (from Foolad Novin)
—	MF	IRI	meysam armiyan (from gostaresh folad tabriz)
—	MF	IRI	Milad Sharifi (from Naft Omidiyeh)
24	MF	IRI	Amir Hossein Mohammadi (from Shahin Bushehr)
—	DF	IRI	Shahab Shahdadnejad (from Mes Kerman)
—	DF	IRI	Kaveh Zangian (to Mes Rafsanjan F.C.)

Out: Note: Flags indicate national team as defined under FIFA eligibility rules; some limited exceptions apply. Players may hold more than one non-FIFA nationality.

No.	Pos.	Nation	Player
—		IRI	Reza Shahrokhabadi (Released)
—		IRI	Jalal Jafari (Released)
19	DF	MLI	Sékou Fofana (to Iranjavan)
—		IRI	Esmaeil Mahmoodabadi (Released)
—		IRI	Javad Bagheri (to Shahrdari Bandar Abbass)
—		IRI	Mahmood Dehshotoran (Released)
—	MF	IRI	Abdollah Albersovilem (Released)
—		IRI	Ahmad Goudarzi (Released)
13	MF	IRI	Behnam Beyranvand (to Shahrdari Tabriz)
—		IRI	Alireza Beykzavie (Released)
—		IRI	Shahab Khorshidi (to Hamyari Arak)
—		IRI	Danial Norouzpour (Released)
—		IRI	Mohammad Javadizadi (to Aboomoslem)
—		IRI	Amin Bochaghchi (Released)
—	DF	IRI	Mohammad Azizi (to Sanat Naft Abadan F.C.)
—		IRI	Shojai Khalilzadeh (to Mes Kerman)

=== Mes Sarcheshmeh ===
In: Note: Flags indicate national team as defined under FIFA eligibility rules; some limited exceptions apply. Players may hold more than one non-FIFA nationality.

No.	Pos.	Nation	Player
—		IRI	Ali Khanagi (from Shirin Faraz)
—		IRI	Ali Javanbaksht (from Shirin Faraz)
—		IRI	Mehdi Dehghran (from Shirin Faraz)
—	GK	IRI	Asghar Karamollahi (from Kowsar)
—	MF	IRI	Mehdi Ashrafi (from Kowsar)
—	GK	ARM	Grigor Meliksetyan (from (Armenia) Impuls Dijan)

Out: Note: Flags indicate national team as defined under FIFA eligibility rules; some limited exceptions apply. Players may hold more than one non-FIFA nationality.

No.	Pos.	Nation	Player
—	MF	IRI	Khosro Rashidi (to Payam Mokhaberat)
—	DF	IRI	Mehdi Ghodoosi (to Foolad Yazd)
—		IRI	Ramin Farman-Ara (to Foolad Yazd)
—	MF	IRI	Hadi Mousavi (to Shirin Faraz)
—	DF	IRI	Reza Sharif (to Gostaresh Foolad)
—	FW	NGR	Abraham Adelaja (from Mashin Sazi)
—		IRI	Sajjad Erfani (to Mashin Sazi)
—	MF	IRI	Ebraham Adval (to Machine Sazi Tabriz)
—	MF	IRI	Yasha Khalili (to Aluminium Hormozgan)
—	DF	IRI	Kaveh Zangian (to Mes Rafsanjan F.C.)
—	MF	IRI	Ahmad Hasanzadeh (to Mes Kerman)

=== Moghavemat Sepasi ===
In: Note: Flags indicate national team as defined under FIFA eligibility rules; some limited exceptions apply. Players may hold more than one non-FIFA nationality.

No.	Pos.	Nation	Player
11	FW	IRI	Reza Taheri (from Damash Gilan)
—	FW	IRI	Younes Shakeri (from Aboomoslem)
—	MF	IRI	Farshad Bahadorani (from Aboomoslem)
—	FW	IRI	Mostafa Shahraki (from Payam Mashhad)
—		IRI	Khaled Shafiei (from Kowsar)
—	DF	IRI	Eshan Rasti (from Payam Mokhaberat)
—	MF	IRI	Ali Peyrovani (from Bargh Shiraz)
—	DF	IRI	Alireza Jalili (from Shahrdari Tabriz)
—	DF	IRI	Omid Khalili (from Etka Gorgan)
—	GK	IRI	Hamed Riahi (from Gostaresh Fooad)

Out: Note: Flags indicate national team as defined under FIFA eligibility rules; some limited exceptions apply. Players may hold more than one non-FIFA nationality.

No.	Pos.	Nation	Player
9	MF	IRI	Mahmoud Mohammadi (Released)
10	FW	IRI	Siamak Koohnavard (Released)
21	GK	IRI	Mohammad Reza Sanaei (Released)
2	DF	IRI	Meysam Amiri (to Iranjavan)
—	FW	IRI	Mostafa Chatrabgoon (to Gostaresh Foolad)
—	MF	IRI	Behnam Afsheh (to Damash Gilan)
23	FW	IRI	Javad Mohammad Zarehei (Released)
24	FW	IRI	Mehdi Shojaei (Released)
22	MF	IRI	Ali Mombaini (to Sanat Naft Abadan F.C.)
26	MF	IRI	Iman Mousavi (to Naft Tehran)
32	MF	IRI	Mohammad Iranpourian (to Shahrdari Tabriz)
—	FW	IRI	Shahram Goudarzi (to Shahrdari Tabriz)
12	DF	IRI	Ali Mohamad Dehghan (Released)
17	MF	IRI	Mehrdad Karimian (Released)
--	DF	IRI	Mirhani Hashemi (to Rah Ahan)
—	MF	IRI	Sadegh Mohammad-Karami (to Shahin Bushehr)
5	DF	IRI	Mohsen Neysani (to Shahrdari Tabriz)
—	DF	IRI	Mostafa Sabri (to Saipa)
27	FW	IRI	Amin Motevaselzadeh (to Rah Ahan)

=== Naft Ahvaz ===
In: Note: Flags indicate national team as defined under FIFA eligibility rules; some limited exceptions apply. Players may hold more than one non-FIFA nationality.

No.	Pos.	Nation	Player
—	DF	NGR	Dominic Okata (from Kowsar)
—	FW	BRA	Anderlei Phillipe Gilmar (from Unknown)
—	DF	IRI	Ali Ben Mohsen (from Foolad Novin)
—	DF	IRI	Ali Badavi (from Sanat Naft Abadan F.C.)
—	FW	BRA	Sandro Santos (from Unknown)
—	GK	IRI	Abolfazl Bahadorani (from Foolad)
—	FW	IRI	Lefteh Hamidi (from Foolad)
—	FW	BRA	Edmundo (from Unknown)

Out: Note: Flags indicate national team as defined under FIFA eligibility rules; some limited exceptions apply. Players may hold more than one non-FIFA nationality.

No.	Pos.	Nation	Player

=== Nassaji Mazandaran ===
In: Note: Flags indicate national team as defined under FIFA eligibility rules; some limited exceptions apply. Players may hold more than one non-FIFA nationality.

No.	Pos.	Nation	Player
—		IRI	Hamed Hajati (to Tarbiat Yazd)
—	MF	IRI	Ali Haddad (from Shamoushak Noshahr)
—	MF	IRI	Mohammad Aramtab (from Tarbiat Yazd)
—	DF	BIH	Delimir Bajić (from (Bosnia and Herzegovina) FK Željezničar)
—	MF	IRI	Akbar Bakhtiari (from Tarbiat Yazd)
—	DF	IRI	Touraj Rajaei (from Shahrdari Bandar Abbas)
18	MF	IRI	Babak Razi (from Zob Ahan)
—	GK	BRA	Daniel Flumignan (from (Romania) Progresul București)
—	MF	IRI	Mehdi Hosseni (from Payam Mashhad)
—	DF	IRI	Hamed Burbur (from Gostaresh Foolad)
—	GK	IRI	Mehrdad Tahmasbi (from Etka Gorgan)

Out: Note: Flags indicate national team as defined under FIFA eligibility rules; some limited exceptions apply. Players may hold more than one non-FIFA nationality.

No.	Pos.	Nation	Player
—	DF	IRI	Reza Niknazar (Released)
—	MF	IRI	Sina Abdi (Released)
—	DF	IRI	Ebrahim Taghipour (to Sanat Sari)
—	MF	IRI	Morteza Kheylimalek (to Sanat Sari)
—	MF	IRI	Ali Yahyanejad (Released)
—	DF	IRI	Mohammad Hosseni (Released)
—	DF	IRI	Alireza Niknazar (Released, to Damash Gilan)
—	MF	BRA	Mateus Alonso Honorio (Released, to Steel Azin)
—	GK	BIH	Almir Tolja (Released)
—	MF	IRI	Reza Moslemzadeh (to Gol Gohar)
—	MF	IRI	Asghar Nadali (to Gostaresh Foolad)
—	DF	IRI	Omid Alishah (to Naft Tehran)
—	FW	MLI	Founéké Sy (to Aboomoslem)
—	FW	IRI	Mehdi Momeni (to Foolad)

=== Payam Mashhad ===
In: Note: Flags indicate national team as defined under FIFA eligibility rules; some limited exceptions apply. Players may hold more than one non-FIFA nationality.

No.	Pos.	Nation	Player
—		IRI	Dariush Rezaeian (from Shahin Ahvaz)
—		IRI	Akbar Dourbinian (from Persepolis Bojnourd)
—		IRI	Farokh Yavari (from Damash Iranian)
—	MF	IRI	Hossein Aghaei (from Gol Gohar)
—	MF	IRI	Massoud Abedi (from Petrochimi Tabriz)
—	MF	IRI	Ehsan Nahavandi (from Aryiana Gostar)
1	GK	IRI	Hamed Tabatabaei (from Damash Gilan F.C.)

Out: Note: Flags indicate national team as defined under FIFA eligibility rules; some limited exceptions apply. Players may hold more than one non-FIFA nationality.

No.	Pos.	Nation	Player
—	MF	IRI	Iman Nematpour (to Aboomoslem)
—	FW	IRI	Mostafa Shahraki (to Moghavemat Sepasi)
8	FW	IRI	Mansour Jamalian (to Aboomoslem)
12	FW	IRI	Mohammad Gholamin (to Aboomoslem)
—	MF	IRI	Mehdi Hosseni (to Nassaji Mazandaran)
37	DF	IRI	Morteza Hashemizadeh (to Saba Qom)
—	MF	IRI	Rohollah Soltani (to Paykan)
—	FW	CMR	Jean Black Ngody (Released)

=== Payam Mokhaberat ===
In: Note: Flags indicate national team as defined under FIFA eligibility rules; some limited exceptions apply. Players may hold more than one non-FIFA nationality.

No.	Pos.	Nation	Player

Out: Note: Flags indicate national team as defined under FIFA eligibility rules; some limited exceptions apply. Players may hold more than one non-FIFA nationality.

No.	Pos.	Nation	Player
—	DF	IRI	Eshan Rasti (to Moghavemat Sepasi)
—		IRI	Javad Zarei (from Bargh Shiraz)
—	GK	IRI	Ali Assadi (to Bargh Shiraz)
—		IRI	Kazem Hayatmanesh (to Bargh Shiraz)
—		IRI	Majid Salehi (to Gol Gohar)
—		IRI	Mohammad Ahmadi (to Shahrdari Bandar Abbas)

=== Sanat Sari ===
In: Note: Flags indicate national team as defined under FIFA eligibility rules; some limited exceptions apply. Players may hold more than one non-FIFA nationality.

No.	Pos.	Nation	Player
—		IRI	Ezzat Pourghaz (from Shamoushak)
—		IRI	Masoud Haghjou (from Shamoushak)
—		IRI	Adnan Delfi (from Aluminium Hormozgan)
—	GK	IRI	Reza Ataei (from Gol Gohar)
—	DF	IRI	Ebrahim Taghipour (from Nassaji Mazandaran)
—	MF	IRI	Morteza Kheylimalek (to Nassaji Mazandaran)
—		IRI	Mohammad Gharib (from Etka Gorgan)
—	DF	IRI	Esmaeil Bale (from Etka)

Out: Note: Flags indicate national team as defined under FIFA eligibility rules; some limited exceptions apply. Players may hold more than one non-FIFA nationality.

No.	Pos.	Nation	Player
—	FW	IRI	Faraj Lotfi (to Gostaresh Foolad)
--	FW	IRI	Hamid Kazemi (to Pas Hamedan)
—	FW	IRI	Jafar Pourmohammad (to Malavan F.C.)

=== Sanati Kaveh ===
In: Note: Flags indicate national team as defined under FIFA eligibility rules; some limited exceptions apply. Players may hold more than one non-FIFA nationality.

No.	Pos.	Nation	Player
—		IRI	Hamed Amirkhani (from Aluminium Hormozgan)
—		IRI	Mojtaba Babak (from Aluminium Hormozgan)
—		IRI	Akbar Sadeghi (from Aluminium Hormozgan)
—		IRI	Abdolfazl Ebrahimi (from Aluminium Hormozgan)

Out: Note: Flags indicate national team as defined under FIFA eligibility rules; some limited exceptions apply. Players may hold more than one non-FIFA nationality.

No.	Pos.	Nation	Player
—	DF	IRI	Siamak Kouroshi (to Naft Tehran)
—	GK	ARM	Gevorg Kasparov (to (Armenia) Mika F.C.)

=== Shahrdari Bandar Abbas ===
In: Note: Flags indicate national team as defined under FIFA eligibility rules; some limited exceptions apply. Players may hold more than one non-FIFA nationality.

No.	Pos.	Nation	Player
—	MF	IRI	Mostafa Mehdizadeh (released, to Shahrdari Tabriz)
—	MF	IRI	Reza Mardani (from Foolad Novin)
—	MF	IRI	Amir Khodamoradi (from Foolad)
—	FW	IRI	Amir Khalifeasl (from Esteghlal Ahvaz)
—	FW	IRI	Mostafa Bijani (from Esteghlal Ahvaz)
—	GK	IRI	Nader Ghobishavi (from Esteghlal Ahvaz)
—	MF	IRI	Maysam Hajian (from Aboomoslem)
—	DF	BRA	Anderson Andrielle (from Shensa Arak)
—		IRI	Javad Bagheri (from Mes Rafsanjan)
—		IRI	Mohammad Ahmadi (from Payam Mokhaberat)
22	MF	IRI	Mostafa Mahdizadeh (from Saba Qom)
—	MF	IRI	Javad Razzaghi (from Esteghlal Ahvaz)
—	MF	IRI	Moslem Mohammadnejad (from Kowsar Lorestan)
—	MF	IRI	Reza Ghanizadeh (from Mes Kerman)
—	MF	IRI	Hamidreza Rajabi (from Esteghlal Ahvaz)
—	FW	ARG	Maximiliano Alberto Vallejo Gomez (from (Montenegro) FK Budućnost Podgorica)
—	DF	ARG	Daniel Romero (from (Argentina) Gimnasia y Esgrima)

Out: Note: Flags indicate national team as defined under FIFA eligibility rules; some limited exceptions apply. Players may hold more than one non-FIFA nationality.

No.	Pos.	Nation	Player
—	MF	IRI	Mohsen Razmpoosh (Released)
—		IRI	Pouya Mandegari (Released)
—		IRI	Amir Mohammadi (Released)
—		IRI	Ghader Afkari (Released)
—		IRI	Ali Vanikhani (Released)
—		IRI	Jaber Nasiri (Released)
—		IRI	Ali Mazrae (Released)
—	MF	IRI	Saeed Ganjkhani (to Aboomoslem)
—	MF	IRI	Mehrdad Avakh (to Aluminium Hormozgan)
—	MF	IRI	Samad Akbari (Released)
—		IRI	Abbas Amiri Moghaddam (Released)
—	MF	IRI	Younes Baghizadeh (Released)
—		IRI	Mehrdad Janangiri (Released)
—	DF	MLI	Abdoul Karim Coulibaly (to Hamyari Arak)
—	DF	IRI	Touraj Rajaei (to Nassaji Mazandaran)
—	MF	IRI	Hossein Hejazi (Released)
—		IRI	Alireza Kordi (Released)
—		IRI	Ahmad Darbandi (Released)
—	MF	IRI	Arman Shahdadinejad (Released)
—		IRI	Hossein Hejazipour (Released)
—	MF	IRI	Omid Ebrahimi (to Sepahan)
—	MF	IRI	Mousa Abbasian (Released)
—		IRI	Javad Teymourinia (Released)
—		IRI	Morteza Rahimi (Released)

=== Shahrdari Yasuj ===
In: Note: Flags indicate national team as defined under FIFA eligibility rules; some limited exceptions apply. Players may hold more than one non-FIFA nationality.

No.	Pos.	Nation	Player

Out: Note: Flags indicate national team as defined under FIFA eligibility rules; some limited exceptions apply. Players may hold more than one non-FIFA nationality.

No.	Pos.	Nation	Player

=== Shamoushak Noshahr ===
In: Note: Flags indicate national team as defined under FIFA eligibility rules; some limited exceptions apply. Players may hold more than one non-FIFA nationality.

No.	Pos.	Nation	Player

Out: Note: Flags indicate national team as defined under FIFA eligibility rules; some limited exceptions apply. Players may hold more than one non-FIFA nationality.

No.	Pos.	Nation	Player
—	MF	IRI	Vahid Paloch (to Sanat Naft Abadan F.C.)
—	DF	IRI	Shaban Asadi (to Sanat Naft Abadan F.C.)
—		IRI	Vahid Nemati (to Saba Qom)

=== Sepidrood Rasht ===
In: Note: Flags indicate national team as defined under FIFA eligibility rules; some limited exceptions apply. Players may hold more than one non-FIFA nationality.

No.	Pos.	Nation	Player
--	MF	IRI	Mohammad Chamandoost (from Malavan)

Out: Note: Flags indicate national team as defined under FIFA eligibility rules; some limited exceptions apply. Players may hold more than one non-FIFA nationality.

No.	Pos.	Nation	Player
—	FW	IRI	Soheil Haghshenas (to Bargh Shiraz)

=== Shirin Faraz ===
In: Note: Flags indicate national team as defined under FIFA eligibility rules; some limited exceptions apply. Players may hold more than one non-FIFA nationality.

No.	Pos.	Nation	Player
—	MF	IRI	Hadi Mousavi (from Mes Sarcheshme)
—	FW	CMR	Jean Black Ngody (from Payam Mashhad)

Out: Note: Flags indicate national team as defined under FIFA eligibility rules; some limited exceptions apply. Players may hold more than one non-FIFA nationality.

No.	Pos.	Nation	Player
—		IRI	Ali Khanagi (to Mes Sarcheshme)
—		IRI	Ali Javanbaksht (from Mes Sarcheshme)
—		IRI	Mehdi Dehghran (from Mes Sarcheshme)
—	FW	CMR	William Biyitti (to Aluminium Hormozgan)
10	MF	CHI	Jose Maria Sanchez Leiva (Released)
—	MF	IRI	Mohammed Mirza Seyedi (from Gol Gohar)
—	FW	IRI	Pourya Darekeh (to Gol Gohar)
—	GK	IRI	Mohammad Khazaei (to Gol Gohar)
—	DF	IRI	Alireza Jarahkar (to Malavan)
—	DF	IRI	Iman Golalizadeh (to Damash Gilan)

=== Tarbiat Yazd ===
In: Note: Flags indicate national team as defined under FIFA eligibility rules; some limited exceptions apply. Players may hold more than one non-FIFA nationality.

No.	Pos.	Nation	Player
—	DF	BIH	Edin Dudo (from (Bosnia and Herzegovina) FK Sarajevo)
—	GK	BIH	Muhamed Alaim (from (Bosnia and Herzegovina) FK Sarajevo)
—	MF	IRI	Hossein Hamidi (from Moghavemat Tehran)
—	FW	IRI	Saeed Mahmoudi (from Niroye Zamini F.C.)
—	FW	IRI	Hamed Shahi (from Entezam Tehran)
—	DF	IRI	Ali Amiri (from Aryana Gostar Kish)
—	MF	IRI	Sajjad Ahmadi (from Aryana Gostar Kish)
—	FW	IRI	Hakim Hazbavipour (from Iranjavan)
—	FW	IRI	Hamed Kianirad (from Damash Iranian)
—	MF	IRI	Habib Shakeri (from Damash Gilan)
—	DF	IRI	Taghi Ghasemzadeh (from Damash Gilan)
—	MF	IRI	Gholamreza Eidizadeh (from Shahrdari Mahshahr)
—	MF	IRI	Ahmad Moghadaspour (from Esteghlal Ahvaz)
—	MF	IRI	Mohammad Bagher Zaferani (from Tractor Sazi)
—	MF	IRI	Reza Kardoust (from Sepidrood Rasht)
—	MF	IRI	Mehran Darvish (from Foolad Yazd)
—	MF	IRI	Alireza Baykzavieh (from Etka Gorgan)

Out: Note: Flags indicate national team as defined under FIFA eligibility rules; some limited exceptions apply. Players may hold more than one non-FIFA nationality.

No.	Pos.	Nation	Player
—		IRI	Iman Nokhodsaz (to Foolad Yazd)
—		IRI	Hamed Hajati (to Nassaji Mazandaran)
—	MF	IRI	Mohammad Aramtab (to Nassaji Mazandaran)
—	MF	IRI	Akbar Bakhtiari (to Nassaji Mazandaran)
—	MF	FRA	Damien Mozika (to (England) Bury)
—	FW	IRI	Alireza Ghadiri (to Mes Kerman)
—	FW	IRI	Rasoul Kor (to Mes Kerman)
—	MF	IRI	Meysam Khodashenas (to Rah Ahan)
—	MF	IRI	Ali Salmani (to Shahin Bushehr F.C.)
—	MF	IRI	Mehdi Zarei (to Rah Ahan)
