= Rafael Pascoal =

Brazilian footballer (born 1990)

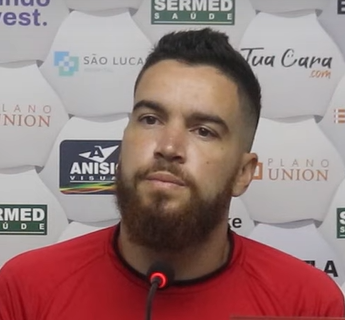
- Rafael Pascoal in 2023

Personal information
- Full name: Rafael Pereira Pascoal
- Date of birth: 2 September 1990 (age 36)
- Place of birth: Taubaté, Brazil
- Height: 1.92 m (6 ft 4 in)
- Position: Goalkeeper

Team information
- Current team: Confiança

Youth career
- Paulista
- Flamengo-SP

Senior career*
Years	Team	Apps	(Gls)
2011	Guarulhos	16	(1)
2012	ECUS	9	(0)
2013–2014	União Mogi	34	(0)
2015	Red Bull Brasil	0	(0)
2015	São José-SP	0	(0)
2016	Atibaia	22	(0)
2016–2017	Bragantino	7	(0)
2018	São Bernardo	1	(0)
2019	Portuguesa	6	(0)
2020	Imperatriz	1	(0)
2020	Linense	1	(0)
2020	Boa Esporte	4	(0)
2021	Rio Claro	16	(0)
2021	Joinville	18	(0)
2022–2023	Botafogo-SP	13	(0)
2023	Pouso Alegre	8	(0)
2023–2025	Portuguesa	1	(0)
2025	→ São Bento (loan)	0	(0)
2026–	Confiança	0	(0)
- * Club domestic league appearances and goals as of 20:11, 5 August 2025 (UTC)

Rafael Pereira Pascoal (born 2 September 1990), known as Rafael Pascoal, is a Brazilian footballer who plays as a goalkeeper for Confiança.

== Club career ==
Born in Taubaté, São Paulo, Pascoal began his career with Guarulhos in the 2011 Campeonato Paulista Segunda Divisão, scoring a goal in a 5–2 away win over União Suzano on 14 May of that year. He subsequently represented ECUS and União Mogi in the same division before moving to Red Bull Brasil for the 2015 season.

Pascoal played the 2015 Copa Paulista with São José-SP, playing one match as a forward. He only became an undisputed starter with Atibaia in the 2016 Campeonato Paulista Série A3, and moved to Série B side Bragantino in June of that year.

On 9 November 2017, Pascoal agreed to a contract with São Bernardo. A backup to Daniel during the 2018 Campeonato Paulista Série A2, he became a starter in the year's Copa Paulista.

On 4 January 2019, Pascoal joined Portuguesa. He signed for Imperatriz on 18 December, but moved to Linense on 6 March 2020, after just three matches.

On 17 July 2020, Pascoal was announced at Boa Esporte. He started the 2021 campaign at Rio Claro, before joining Joinville on 21 May of that year.

In January 2022, Pascoal moved to Botafogo-SP. A backup option in the club's promotion to the second division, he signed for Pouso Alegre on 5 April 2023.

Released from Pousão on 26 July 2023, Pascoal returned to Lusa a day later. A backup to Thomazella in the 2024 campaign, he became a starter in the Copa Paulista, before being demoted to third-choice behind new signings Rafael Santos and Bruno Bertinato in the 2025 season.

On 28 March 2025, Pascoal agreed to join Confiança on loan until the end of the year, but the deal later collapsed as he did not feature in any state league matches during the year. On 22 August, he joined São Bento on loan for the Copa Paulista.

On 2 December 2025, Pascoal moved permanently to Confiança for the upcoming season.

== Career statistics ==
As of 18 November 2025

Club	Season	League			State League		Cup		Continental		Other		Total	
Club	Season	Division	Apps	Goals	Apps	Goals	Apps	Goals	Apps	Goals	Apps	Goals	Apps	Goals
Guarulhos	2011	Paulista 2ª Divisão	—		16	1	—		—		—		16	1
ECUS	2012	Paulista 2ª Divisão	—		9	0	—		—		—		9	0
União Mogi	2013	Paulista 2ª Divisão	—		15	0	—		—		—		15	0
União Mogi	2014	Paulista 2ª Divisão	—		19	0	—		—		—		19	0
União Mogi	Total		—		34	0	—		—		—		34	0
Red Bull Brasil	2015	Série D	0	0	0	0	—		—		—		0	0
São José-SP	2015	Paulista A3	—		0	0	—		—		6 (Note: Appearance(s) in Copa Paulista)	0	6	0
Atibaia	2016	Paulista A3	—		22	0	—		—		—		22	0
Bragantino	2016	Série B	0	0	—		—		—		17	0	17	0
Bragantino	2017	Série C	7	0	0	0	0	0	—		—		7	0
Bragantino	Total		7	0	0	0	0	0	—		17	0	24	0
São Bernardo	2018	Paulista A2	—		1	0	—		—		14	0	15	0
Portuguesa	2019	Paulista A2	—		6	0	—		—		10	0	16	0
Imperatriz	2020	Série C	0	0	1	0	0	0	—		2 (Note: Appearance(s) in Copa do Nordeste)	0	3	0
Linense	2020	Paulista A3	—		1	0	—		—		—		1	0
Boa Esporte	2020	Série C	4	0	3	0	—		—		—		7	0
Rio Claro	2021	Paulista A2	—		16	0	—		—		—		16	0
Joinville	2021	Série D	18	0	—		—		—		—		18	0
Botafogo-SP	2022	Série C	4	0	2	0	0	0	—		8	0	14	0
Botafogo-SP	2023	Série B	0	0	7	0	0	0	—		—		7	0
Botafogo-SP	Total		4	0	9	0	0	0	—		8	0	21	0
Pouso Alegre	2023	Série C	8	0	—		—		—		—		8	0
Portuguesa	2023	Paulista	—		0	0	—		—		7	0	7	0
Portuguesa	2024	Paulista	—		0	0	—		—		16	0	16	0
Portuguesa	2025	Série D	1	0	0	0	0	0	—		—		1	0
Portuguesa	Total		1	0	0	0	0	0	—		23	0	24	0
São Bento (loan)	2025	Paulista A2	—		—		—		—		2	0	2	0
Confiança	2026	Série C	0	0	0	0	0	0	—		0	0	0	0
Career total			42	0	118	1	0	0	0	0	82	0	242	1
