= Sajad Abarghouei Nejad =

Iranian footballer

Personal information
- Full name: Sajad Abarghouei Nejad
- Date of birth: 17 September 1987 (age 39)
- Place of birth: Isfahan City, Isfahan
- Height: 1.83 m (6 ft 0 in)
- Position: Striker

Team information
- Current team: Zob Ahan F.C.
- Number: 24

Youth career
- 1995–2000: Zob Ahan Isfahan F.C. Juniors
- 2000–2004: Shahrdari Youth

Senior career*
Years	Team	Apps	(Gls)
2005–2006	Bargh United F.C.	16	(8)
2007–2008	Zob Ahan Novin Isfahan F.C. (loan)	32	(12)
2009–2010	Foolad Natanz F.C.	11	(1)
2010–2012	Zob Ahan Isfahan F.C.		
2012–2013	Giti Pasand Isfahan F.C.		
- * Club domestic league appearances and goals

Sajad Abarghouei Nejad (born 17 September 1987) in Isfahan is a footballer. He played in his early years for Zob Ahan Isfahan F.C. Juniors before starting his professional career with Bargh United F.C. He moved to Sepahan Novin F.C. in 2009 and after that to Foolad Natanz F.C. in 2010.
