= Vafa Hakhamaneshi =

Iranian footballer

Personal information
- Date of birth: 27 March 1991 (age 35)
- Place of birth: Gonbad-e Kavus, Iran
- Height: 1.98 m (6 ft 6 in)
- Position: Centre-back

Team information
- Current team: Negeri Sembilan
- Number: 6

Youth career
- 2008–2010: Sepahan

Senior career*
Years	Team	Apps	(Gls)
2008–2010	Sepahan Novin	36	(1)
2010–2011	Foolad Natanz	11	(0)
2011–2013	Naft Tehran	7	(0)
2013–2014	Foolad	16	(0)
2014–2016	Fajr Sepasi	23	(0)
2016–2018	Khooneh be Khooneh	36	(1)
2018–2019	Sanat Naft	26	(1)
2019–2020	Al-Minaa	11	(0)
2020	Zob Ahan	9	(0)
2020–2021	Tractor	12	(0)
2021	Ratchaburi	12	(2)
2022–2023	Chennaiyin	18	(1)
2023–	Negeri Sembilan	0	(0)

International career
2008–2010	Iran U20		
- * Club domestic league appearances and goals as of 19:12, 24 February 2023 (UTC)

Vafa Hakhamaneshi (born 27 March 1991) is an Iranian professional footballer who plays as a centre-back for Malaysia Super League club Negeri Sembilan and the Iran national team.

== Club career ==
=== Earlier career ===
Hakhamaneshi joined Naft Tehran in 2011, having spent the 2009–2010 season at Sepahan Novin in the Azadegan League before joining Foolad Natanz in 2010.

He won the 2013–14 Iran Pro League with Foolad.

Hakhamaneshi made three appearances for Thai League 1 side Ratchaburi Mitr Phol F.C. in the AFC Champions League.

=== Chennaiyin ===
In June 2022, Hakhamaneshi moved to Indian Super League club Chennaiyin on a one-year deal. On 1 September, he scored a goal from a header on his club debut against TRAU in the Durand Cup, which ended in a 4–1 win.

On 14 October 2022, in an Indian Super League home match against Bengaluru, Hakhamaneshi volunteered to go in goal for the last 8 minutes after goalkeeper Debjit Majumder was sent off; he did not concede as the match ended 1–1.

== International career ==
Hakhamaneshi has played for the Iran national under-20 football team.

== Career statistics ==
=== Club ===
As of 19 April 2023

Club	Season	League			Cup		AFC		Total	
Club	Season	Division	Apps	Goals	Apps	Goals	Apps	Goals	Apps	Goals
Foolad Natanz	2010–11	League 1	11	0	0	0	—		11	0
Naft Tehran	2011–12	Persian Gulf Pro League	6	0	1 (Note: Appearance(s) in Iranian Hazfi Cup)	0	—		7	0
Naft Tehran	2012–13	Persian Gulf Pro League	1	0	0	0	—		1	0
Naft Tehran	Naft Tehran total		7	0	1	0	0	0	8	0
Foolad	2012–13	Persian Gulf Pro League	4	0	0	0	—		4	0
Foolad	2013–14	Persian Gulf Pro League	2	0	0	0	—		2	0
Foolad	Foolad total		6	0	0	0	0	0	6	0
Fajr Sepasi	2014–15	League 1	6	0	0	0	—		6	0
Fajr Sepasi	2015–16	League 1	20	0	0	0	—		20	0
Fajr Sepasi	Fajr Sepasi total		26	0	0	0	0	0	26	0
Khooneh be Khooneh	2016–17	League 1	14	0	1	0	—		15	0
Khooneh be Khooneh	2017–18	League 1	22	1	3	0	—		25	1
Khooneh be Khooneh	Khooneh be Khooneh total		36	1	4	0	0	0	40	1
Sanat Naft	2018–19	Persian Gulf Pro League	26	1	3	0	—		29	1
Zob Ahan	2019–20	Persian Gulf Pro League	9	0	0	0	—		9	0
Tractor	2020–21	Persian Gulf Pro League	12	0	0	0	—		12	0
Ratchaburi	2021–22	Thai League 1	0	0	0	0	3 (Note: Appearance(s) in AFC Champions League)	0	3	0
Chennaiyin	2022–23	Indian Super League	18	1	6 (Note: Appearance(s) in Durand Cup) (Note: Appearance(s) in Super Cup)	2	—		24	3
Career total			151	3	14	2	3	0	168	5

== Honours ==
Foolad

- Iran Pro League: 2013–14
