= Shahriar Shirvand =

Iranian footballer (born 1991)

Personal information
- Full name: Shahriar Shirvand
- Date of birth: 21 March 1991 (age 35)
- Place of birth: Ardabil, Iran
- Position: Midfielder

Team information
- Current team: Sardar Bukan F.C.

Youth career
- Inter Campus

Senior career*
Years	Team	Apps	(Gls)
2007–2011	Sepahan	4	(0)
2010–2011	→ Foolad Natanz (loan)	22	(0)
2011–2012	Machine Sazi	17	(0)
2012–2013	Gostaresh Foolad	23	(2)
2013–2016	Tractor Sazi	7	(0)
2016–	Shahrdari Ardabil	0	(0)

International career^{‡}
2008–2009	Iran U20	3	(0)
2012–2014	Iran U23	8	(0)
- * Club domestic league appearances and goals as of 10 May 2013 ‡ National team caps and goals as of 27 March 2010

Shahriar Shirvand (born March 21, 1991) is an Iranian footballer who currently plays for Shahrdari Ardabil in Azadegan League.

== Club career ==
Shirvand started his senior career at Sepahan.

=== Club career statistics ===
As of 10 May 2013

Club performance			League		Cup		Continental		Total	
Season	Club	League	Apps	Goals	Apps	Goals	Apps	Goals	Apps	Goals
Iran			League		Hazfi Cup		Asia		Total	
2007–08	Sepahan	Pro League	1	0	2	0	1	0	4	0
2008–09	Sepahan	Pro League	3	0	0	0	0	0	3	0
2009–10	Sepahan	Pro League	0	0	0	0	0	0	0	0
2010–11	Foolad Natanz	Division 1	22	0	1	1	–	–	23	1
2011–12	Machine Sazi	Division 1	17	0	0	0	–	–	17	0
2012–13	Gostaresh	Division 1	22	0	0	0	–	–	22	0
2013–14	Tractor Sazi	Pro League	0	0	0	0	0	0	3	0
Total	Iran		43	0	5	1	1	0	49	1
Career total			43	0	5	1	1	0	49	1

- Assist Goals

Season	Team	Assists
09–10	Sepahan	0

== International ==
Shirvand participated in the 2008 AFC U-19 Championship. He named in Iran U23 final list for Incheon 2014.

== Honours ==
=== Club ===
Sepahan

- Iran Pro League (1): 2009–10
  - Runner-up (1): 2007–08

Tractor Sazi

- Hazfi Cup (1): 2013–14
