= Ruhollah Bigdeli =

Iranian footballer (born 1984)

Personal information
- Full name: Ruhollah Bigdeli
- Date of birth: March 21, 1984 (age 42)
- Place of birth: Iran
- Position: Striker

Team information
- Current team: Mes Sarcheshmeh

Youth career
- Esteghlal Ahvaz

Senior career*
Years	Team	Apps	(Gls)
2006–2008	Esteghlal Ahvaz	42	(14)
2008–2010	Mes Kerman	53	(12)
2010–2011	Foolad	5	(0)
2011–2012	Foolad Natanz	?	(?)
2012–	Mes Sarcheshmeh	0	(0)

International career
2006–2007	Iran U23		
- * Club domestic league appearances and goals

Ruhollah Bigdeli (Persian: روح الله بیگدلی; born 21 March 1984) is an Iranian football striker of Mes Sarcheshmeh.

== Club career ==
=== Club career statistics ===
As of 19 October 2010

Club performance			League		Cup		Continental		Total	
Season	Club	League	Apps	Goals	Apps	Goals	Apps	Goals	Apps	Goals
Iran			League		Hazfi Cup		Asia		Total	
2006–07	Esteghlal Ahvaz	Persian Gulf Cup	9	2			-	-		
2007–08	Esteghlal Ahvaz	Persian Gulf Cup	33	12			-	-		
2008–09	Mes	Persian Gulf Cup	33	9			-	-		
2009–10	Mes	Persian Gulf Cup	20	3			3	0		
2010–11	Foolad	Persian Gulf Cup	5	0	1	0	-	-	6	0
Total	Iran		100	26			3	0		
Career total			100	26			3	0		

- Assist Goals

Season	Team	Assists
07–08	Esteghlal Ahvaz	4
08–09	Mes Kerman	2
10–11	Foolad	0
