= Anderson Marabá =

Brazilian footballer (born 1983)

Personal information
- Full name: Anderson Andrielle Pereira Vieira
- Date of birth: 30 April 1983 (age 43)
- Place of birth: Marabá, Brazil
- Height: 1.72 m (5 ft 7 1/2 in)
- Position: Defender

Team information
- Current team: Shensa
- Number: 20

Youth career
- 1995–1996: Unibol-PE
- 1996–1997: Vitória
- 1997–1998: Figueirense
- 1998–1999: Paysandu
- 1999–2000: América

Senior career*
Years	Team	Apps	(Gls)
2001–2002	Juventus		
2003–2004	Náutico		
2005	Central Sport Club		
2006	Juventus		
2006	Marcílio Dias		
2007	Anápolis		
2007	Ulbra Ji-Paraná		
2008	Rio Branco		
2009	Agremiação		
2009–2010	Shensa	?	(3)
2010–	Shahrdari		
- * Club domestic league appearances and goals

Anderson Andrielle Pereira Vieira (born 30 April 1983 in Marabá), known as Anderson Marabá, is a Brazilian footballer who currently plays for Shensa Arak F.C.

== Career ==
Anderson Marabá joined Shensa Arak F.C. in 2009
