= Yasha Khalili =

Iranian footballer

Personal information
- Full name: Yasha Khalili
- Date of birth: 27 April 1988 (age 38)
- Place of birth: Iran
- Position: Midfielder

Team information
- Current team: Aluminium

Youth career
- –2006: Mes Kerman

Senior career*
Years	Team	Apps	(Gls)
2006–2009	Mes Kerman	17	(0)
2009–2010	Mes Sarcheshme	22	(2)
2010–	Aluminium	1	(0)
- * Club domestic league appearances and goals as of August 13, 2010 (UTC) ‡ National team caps and goals as of August 13, 2010

Yasha Khalili (born 27 April 1988) is an Iranian footballer who plays for Aluminium Hormozgan.

== Club career ==
Khalili joined Aluminium in 2010 after spending the previous season at Mes Sarcheshme in the Azadegan League.

Club performance			League		Cup		Continental		Total	
Season	Club	League	Apps	Goals	Apps	Goals	Apps	Goals	Apps	Goals
Iran			League		Hazfi Cup		Asia		Total	
2006–07	Mes Kerman	Persian Gulf Cup	5	0			-	-		
2007–08	Mes Kerman	Persian Gulf Cup	12	0			-	-		
2008–09	Mes Kerman	Persian Gulf Cup	0	0			-	-		
2009–10	Mes Sarcheshme	Azadegan	22	2			-	-		
2010–11	Aluminium	Azadegan	1	0			-	-		
Total	Iran		40	2			0	0		
Career total			40	2			0	0		

- Assist Goals

Season	Team	Assists
2010–11	Malavan	0
