= Ali Azari Karki =

Iranian footballer

Ali Azari
Personal information
- Full name: Ali Karkonazari
- Date of birth: 1 June 1977 (age 49)
- Place of birth: Iran
- Height: 1.80 m (5 ft 11 in)
- Position: Striker

Team information
- Current team: Damash Iranian

Senior career*
Years	Team	Apps	(Gls)
2008–2010	Steel Azin	37	(3)
2010–2011	Damash Iranian	11	(3)

International career^{‡}
- Iran U-23
- * Club domestic league appearances and goals as of 28 September 2010 ‡ National team caps and goals as of 25 November 2010

Ali Azari (Persian: علی آذری, born 2 June 1985) is an Iranian football left midfielder of Damash Iranian F.C. He was a member of Iran national under-23 football team.

== Club career ==
=== Club career statistics ===
As of 6 June 2010

Club performance			League	
Season	Club	League	Apps	Goals
Iran			League	
2008–09	Steel Azin	Azadegan League	16	2
2009–10	Steel Azin	Persian Gulf Cup	21	1
Total	Iran		37	3
Career total			37	3

- Assist Goals

Season	Team	Assists
09–10	Steel Azin	1
