= Rasoul Kor =

Iranian footballer

Personal information
- Full name: Rasoul Kor
- Date of birth: 24 June 1989 (age 37)
- Place of birth: Iran
- Position: Defender

Team information
- Current team: Naft Novin

Youth career
- –2008: Shamoushak

Senior career*
Years	Team	Apps	(Gls)
2008–2009	Shamoushak		(1)
2009–2010	Tarbiat Yazd		(1)
2010–	Mes Kerman	2	(0)

International career^{‡}
2004	Iran U-17		
2007–2008	Iran U-20	6	(1)
2010–	Iran U-23	6	(0)
- * Club domestic league appearances and goals as of 9 March 2010 (UTC) ‡ National team caps and goals as of 21 June 2011

Rasoul Kor (Persian: رسول کر, born June 24, 1989) is an Iranian footballer who plays for Mes Kerman F.C. in the IPL.

== Club career ==
In 2010, Kor joined Mes Kerman F.C. after spending the previous season at Tarbiat Yazd F.C. in the Azadegan League.

Club performance			League		Cup		Continental		Total	
Season	Club	League	Apps	Goals	Apps	Goals	Apps	Goals	Apps	Goals
Iran			League		Hazfi Cup		Asia		Total	
2008–09	Shamoushak	Azadegan		1	0	0	-	-		1
2009–10	Tarbiat Yazd	Azadegan		1	0	0	-	-		1
2010–11	Mes	Persian Gulf Cup	2	0	1	0	-	-	3	0
Total	Iran			2	0	0	0	0		2
Career total				2	0	0	0	0		2

- Assist Goals

Season	Team	Assists
2010–11	Mes	0
