= Jean Black Ngody =

Cameroonian footballer

Personal information
- Full name: Jean Black Ngody
- Date of birth: 21 January 1978 (age 48)
- Place of birth: Mudeka, Cameroon
- Height: 1.78 m (5 ft 10 in)
- Position: Forward

Senior career*
Years	Team	Apps	(Gls)
1994–1995	PWD Bamenda		
1995–1997	Unisport de Bafang		
1997–1998	Victoria United Limbe		
1998–1999	Odra Opole	3	(0)
1999–2000	Kavala	0	(0)
2000–2001	Górnik Zabrze	4	(0)
2000–2001	Stomil Olsztyn	1	(0)
2001–2003	Okęcie Warsaw		
2003–2004	Zorza Dobrzany		
2004–2005	Narew Ostrołęka		
2005–2006	Perlis FA		
2005–2006	Stal Mielec		
2006–2007	Kettering Town	3	(1)
2007–2008	Cwmbran Town	14	(10)
2008–2009	Maidenhead United	0	(0)
2008–2009	Halesowen Town		
2009	Aboomoslem	19	(4)
2009–2010	Iranjavan	6	(0)
2010	Payam	12	(2)
2010–2011	Shirin Faraz		
- * Club domestic league appearances and goals

Jean Black Ngody (born 21 January 1978) is a Cameroonian former professional footballer. He played as a forward and midfielder for various clubs across Poland, England, Wales, and Iran throughout his career.

== Career ==
He previously played for Górnik Zabrze and Stomil Olsztyn in the Polish Ekstraklasa and various clubs in England, Greece, and Wales.

== Club career ==
Season	Team	Country	League	Apps	Goals!
08–09	Aboomoslem	Iran	IPL	19	4
09–10	Payam	Iran	D1	12	2
10–11	Shirin Faraz	Iran	D1	?	?
