= Amir Mohebi =

Iranian footballer

Personal information
- Full name: Amir Mohebi
- Date of birth: 24 February 1981 (age 45)
- Place of birth: Iran
- Position: Midfielder

Team information
- Current team: Pars Jonoubi
- Number: 8

Youth career
- Aboumoslem

Senior career*
Years	Team	Apps	(Gls)
2005–2007	Aboumoslem	3	(0)
2007–2008	Sanaye Arak	?	(3)
2008–2010	Tractor Sazi	56	(16)
2010–	Pas Hamedan	0	(0)

Managerial career
- 2019–: Pars Jonoubi
- * Club domestic league appearances and goals as of 3 September 2010

Amir Mohebi (born 24 February 1981) is an Iranian footballer who currently plays for Pas Hamedan in Iran's Premier Football League.

== Club career ==
=== Club career statistics ===
As of 19 October 2010

Club performance			League		Cup		Continental		Total	
Season	Club	League	Apps	Goals	Apps	Goals	Apps	Goals	Apps	Goals
Iran			League		Hazfi Cup		Asia		Total	
2005–06	Aboumoslem	Persian Gulf Cup	3	0			-	-		
2006–07	Aboumoslem	Persian Gulf Cup	0	0			-	-		
2007–08	Sanaye Arak	Azadegan League		3			-	-		
2008–09	Tractor Sazi	Azadegan League	26	9			-	-		
2009–10	Tractor Sazi	Persian Gulf Cup	30	7			-	-		
2010–11	Pas	Persian Gulf Cup	0	0	1	0	-	-	1	0
Total	Iran			19			0	0		
Career total				19			0	0		

- Assist Goals

Season	Team	Assists
09–10	Tractor Sazi	1
10–11	Pas	0

== International career ==
In 2009, Mohebi was summoned by the Iranian Football Federation to participate in a friendly match against Iceland.
