= Behnam Beyranvand =

Iranian footballer

Personal information
- Full name: Behnam Beyranvand
- Place of birth: Khorramabad, Iran
- Position: Forward

Senior career*
Years	Team	Apps	(Gls)
2007–2008	Tarbiat Yazd	26	(12)
2008–2009	Rah Ahan	8	(1)
2009–2010	Mes Rafsanjan	24	(5)
2010–2012	Shahrdari Tabriz	16	(2)
2012–2013	Shahin Bushehr	3	(0)
2013	Aboomoslem	9	(4)
2013–2014	Siah Jamegan	4	(0)
2014–2015	Aboomoslem	15	(5)
- * Club domestic league appearances and goals as of 10 June 2010 ‡ National team caps and goals as of 8 May 2010

Behnam Beyranvand is an Iranian footballer who plays forward for Aboomoslem of the Azadegan League.

== Club career ==
Beyranvand joined Shahrdari Tabriz in 2010 after playing the previous season at Mes Rafsanjan in the Azadegan League.

Club performance			League		Cup		Continental		Total	
Season	Club	League	Apps	Goals	Apps	Goals	Apps	Goals	Apps	Goals
Iran			League		Hazfi Cup		Asia		Total	
2007–08	Tarbiat Yazd	Azadegan	26	12			-	-		
2008–09	Rah Ahan	Persian Gulf Cup	8	1			-	-		
2009–10	Mes Rafsanjan	Azadegan	24	5			-	-		
2010–11	Shahrdari Tabriz	Persian Gulf Cup	2	0	0	0	-	-	0	0
Total	Iran		58	18			0	0		
Career total			58	18			0	0		

- Assists

Season	Team	Assists
2010–11	Shahrdari Tabriz	0
