= Mohsen Neysani =

Iranian footballer

Personal information
- Full name: Mohsen Neysani
- Date of birth: August 15, 1982 (age 44)
- Place of birth: Iran
- Position: Defender

Team information
- Current team: Shahrdari Tabriz
- Number: 5

Youth career
- Fajr Sepasi

Senior career*
| Years | Team | Apps | (Gls) |
| 2005–2010 | Moghavemat | 124 | (1) |
| 2010– | Shahrdari Tabriz | 6 | (0) |
- * Club domestic league appearances and goals as of 10 September 2010 ‡ National team caps and goals as of 19 March 2010

Mohsen Neysani (born August 15, 1982) is an Iranian football player who currently plays for Shahrdari Tabriz of the Iran Pro League.

== Professional ==
Neysani played at Moghavemat Sepasi until 2010. In 2010, he joined Shahrdari Tabriz.

| Club performance | | | League | | Cup | | Continental | | Total | |
| Season | Club | League | Apps | Goals | Apps | Goals | Apps | Goals | Apps | Goals |
| Iran | | | League | | Hazfi Cup | | Asia | | Total | |
|---|---|---|---|---|---|---|---|---|---|---|
| 2004–05 | Moghavemat | Persian Gulf Cup | 12 | 0 | | | - | - | | |
| 2005–06 | Moghavemat | Persian Gulf Cup | 25 | 0 | | | - | - | | |
| 2006–07 | Moghavemat | Persian Gulf Cup | 12 | 0 | | | - | - | | |
| 2007–08 | Moghavemat | Persian Gulf Cup | 31 | 1 | | | - | - | | |
| 2008–09 | Moghavemat | Persian Gulf Cup | 31 | 0 | | 0 | - | - | | 0 |
| 2009–10 | Moghavemat | Persian Gulf Cup | 13 | 0 | | 0 | - | - | | 0 |
| 2010–11 | Shahrdari Tabriz | Persian Gulf Cup | 6 | 0 | 1 | 1 | - | - | 7 | 1 |
| Total | Iran | | 118 | 1 | | | 0 | 0 | | |
| Career total | | | 118 | 1 | | | 0 | 0 | | |

- Assist Goals

| Season | Team | Assists |
|---|---|---|
| 10–11 | Shahrdari Tabriz | 0 |
