= Mehdi Agha Mohammadi =

Iranian footballer

Personal information
- Full name: Mehdi Agha Mohammadi
- Place of birth: Iran
- Position: Midfielder

Team information
- Current team: Naft Tehran

Senior career*
Years	Team	Apps	(Gls)
2007–2008	Homa	25	(1)
2008–2009	Aboomoslem	15	(1)
2009–2010	Tarbiat Yazd	24	(1)
2010–2011	Pas Hamedan	3	(0)
2011–2012	Aluminium Horm.	8	(1)
2012–2014	Naft Tehran	10	(0)
- * Club domestic league appearances and goals as of 3 January 2012

Mehdi Agha Mohammadi (Persian: مهدی آقا محمدی) is an Iranian footballer. He played for Naft Tehran in Iran Pro League.

== Club career ==
In 2010, Agha Mohammadi joined Pas Hamedan F.C. after spending the previous season at Tarbiat Yazd F.C. in the Azadegan League.

Club performance			League		Cup		Continental		Total	
Season	Club	League	Apps	Goals	Apps	Goals	Apps	Goals	Apps	Goals
Iran			League		Hazfi Cup		Asia		Total	
2007–08	Homa Tehran	Division 1	25	1			-	-		
2009–09	Aboomoslem	Pro League	15	1	1	0	-	-	16	1
2009–10	Tarbiat Yazd	Division 1	24	1			-	-		
2010–11	Pas Hamedan	Pro League	3	0	1	0	-	-	4	0
2011–12	Aluminium Hormozgan	Division 1					-	-		
2011–12	Naft Tehran	Pro League	0	0	0	0	-	-	0	0
Career total			67	3			0	0		

- Assist Goals

Season	Team	Assists
10–11	Pas Hamedan	1
