= Ali Mombaini =

Iranian footballer (born 1981)

Personal information
- Full name: Ali Mombaini
- Date of birth: 22 November 1981 (age 44)
- Place of birth: Iran
- Height: 1.84 m (6 ft 1/2 in)
- Position: Midfielder

Team information
- Current team: Aluminium

Senior career*
Years	Team	Apps	(Gls)
2007–2008	Mes Kerman	10	(1)
2008–2010	Moghavemat	53	(1)
2010–2013	Sanat Naft	64	(8)
2013–	Aluminium	0	(0)
- * Club domestic league appearances and goals

Ali Mombaini (Persian: علی ممبینی; born 22 November 1981) is an Iranian former footballer who last played for Aluminium in Azadegan League.

== Club career ==
In 2010, Mombaini joined Sanat Naft after spending the previous two season at Moghavemat.

Club performance			League		Cup		Continental		Total	
Season	Club	League	Apps	Goals	Apps	Goals	Apps	Goals	Apps	Goals
Iran			League		Hazfi Cup		Asia		Total	
2007–08	Mes	Pro League	10	1			–	–	10	1
2008–09	Moghavemat	Pro League	21	1			–	–	21	1
2009–10	Moghavemat	Pro League	32	0			–	–	32	0
2010–11	Sanat Naft	Pro League	31	5	0	0	–	–	31	5
2011–12	Sanat Naft	Pro League	31	3	2	0	–	–	33	3
2012–13	Sanat Naft	Pro League	0	0	0	0	–	–	0	0
2013–14	Aluminium	Division 1	0	0	0	0	–	–	0	0
Career total			125	10	2	0	0	0	127	10

- Assists

Season	Team	Assists
10–11	Sanat Naft	2
11–12	Sanat Naft	4
12–13	Sanat Naft	0
