= Saleh Khalilazad =

Iranian footballer

Mohammad-Saleh Khalil-Azad
Personal information
- Full name: Mohammad-Saleh Khalil-Azad
- Date of birth: 17 April 1990 (age 36)
- Place of birth: Shiraz, Iran
- Height: 1.98 m (6 ft 6 in)
- Position: Goalkeeper

Team information
- Current team: Fajr Sepasi
- Number: 1

Youth career
- –2008: Bargh Shiraz

Senior career*
Years	Team	Apps	(Gls)
2007–2010	Bargh Shiraz	12	(0)
2010–2011	Rah Ahan	0	(0)
2011–	Fajr Sepasi	108	(0)
Total		24	(0)

International career^{‡}
2008–2010	Iran U-20		
2010	Iran U-23	1	(0)
- * Club domestic league appearances and goals as of 13 March 2013 ‡ National team caps and goals as of 23 February 2011

Mohammad-Saleh Khalil-Azad (Persian: محمدصالح خليل آزاد, born 17 April 1990 in Shiraz) is an Iranian professional football goalkeeper who currently plays for Fajr Sepasi.

== Club career ==
=== Club career statistics ===
As of 13 March 2013

Club performance			League		Cup		Continental		Total	
Season	Club	League	Apps	Goals	Apps	Goals	Apps	Goals	Apps	Goals
Iran			League		Hazfi Cup		Asia		Total	
2007–08	Bargh	Pro League	1	0			–	–		
2008–09	Bargh	Pro League	10	0			–	–		
2009–10	Bargh	Division 1	1	0			–	–		
2010–11	Rah Ahan	Pro League	0	0	0	0	–	–	0	0
2011–12	Fajr Sepasi	Pro League	2	0	0	0	–	–	2	0
2012–13	Fajr Sepasi	Pro League	10	0	0	0	–	–	10	0
Career total			14	0			0	0		
