= Esporte Clube União Suzano =

ECUS
- Full name: Esporte Clube União Suzano
- Nickname: Leão do Colorado
- Founded: 25 October 1993
- Ground: Suzanão, Suzano, São Paulo state, Brazil
- Capacity: 3,445
- President: William da Silva
- League: Campeonato Paulista Série A4
- 2025: Paulista Segunda Divisão, 2nd of 15 (promoted)
| Home colors | Away colors |

Esporte Clube União Suzano, commonly known as ECUS, is a Brazilian football and volleyball club based in Suzano, São Paulo state. The men's volleyball team won the Superliga Brasileira de Voleibol once.

== History ==
The club was founded on 25 October 1993.

=== Football ===
They won the Campeonato Paulista Série B2 in 2002.

=== Volleyball ===
ECUS men's team, adopting the name Report/Suzano, won the Superliga Brasileira de Voleibol in the 1996-1997 season.

== Achievements ==
=== Football ===
- Campeonato Paulista Segunda Divisão:
  - Winners (1): 2002

=== Volleyball ===
- Superliga Brasileira de Voleibol:
  - Winners (1): 1996-1997

== Stadium ==
Esporte Clube União Suzano play their home games at Estádio Francisco Marques Figueira, nicknamed Suzanão. The stadium has a maximum capacity of 3,445 people.

== Rivalries ==
The main rival of ECUS is União Suzano (USAC) with whom does O Clássico dos Gemeos (English: The classic of the twins)
