= Nei Paraíba =

Brazilian footballer

Personal information
- Full name: Emanoel Vilanez Fernandes de Souza
- Date of birth: December 25, 1982 (age 43)
- Place of birth: Guarabira, Brazil
- Height: 1.85 m (6 ft 1 in)
- Position: Forward

Senior career*
Years	Team	Apps	(Gls)
2006	Desportiva Guarabira		
2007	Propriá		
2007	América		
2008–2012	Vera Cruz		
2008	→ Fortaleza (loan)	3	(1)
2009	→ Oeste (loan)	16	(4)
2009	→ Guarani (loan)	20	(2)
2010–2011	→ Sanat Naft (loan)	9	(6)
2011	→ Salgueiro (loan)	0	(0)
2012–2013	São Caetano	8	(1)
2013	Mogi Mirim	13	(2)
- * Club domestic league appearances and goals

Emanoel Vilanez Fernandes de Souza (born December 25, 1982), known as Nei Paraíba, is a Brazilian former professional footballer who played as a forward.

== Career ==
Nei Paraíba joined Sanat Naft in 2010 after spending the previous season on loan at Guarani Futebol Clube in the Campeonato Brasileiro Série A.

== Career statistics ==
Club performance			League		Cup		Continental		Total	
Season	Club	League	Apps	Goals	Apps	Goals	Apps	Goals	Apps	Goals
Iran			League		Hazfi Cup		Asia		Total	
2009–10	Sanat Naft	Azadegan	7	6	0	0	-	-	7	6
2010–11	Sanat Naft	IPL	2	0	0	0	-	-	2	0
Total	Iran		9	6	0	0	0	0	8	0
Career total			9	6	0	0	0	0	8	0

== External sources ==
- Profile at Persianleague
