= Mohammad Sadegh Karami =

Iranian footballer

Personal information
- Full name: Sadegh Mohammad-Karami
- Date of birth: 21 March 1984 (age 42)
- Place of birth: Iran
- Height: 1.83 m (6 ft 0 in)
- Positions: Center-back; midfielder
- ‡ National team caps and goals as of 9 June 2023

Sadegh Mohammad-Karami (Persian: محمد صادق کرمی; born March 21, 1984) was an Iranian footballer who retired in 2019.

Club	Stats
Naft Omidiyeh F.C.	App: 52
Qashqai F.C.	Goals: 3
Bargh Jadid Shiraz F.C.	Subs: 7
PAS Hamedan F.C.	Fouls: 13
Esteghlal Ahvaz F.C.	Yel: 12
Sarcheshmeh F. C.	Red: 1
Gahar Zagros F.C.	Min: 6523
Shahin Bushehr F.C.	Other: 26 App
Fajr Sepasi Shiraz F.C. - U21	Other Goals: 2
	Status: Retired
