= Farid Abedi =

Iranian footballer (born 1977)

Personal information
- Full name: Farid Abedi
- Date of birth: 28 August 1977 (age 49)
- Place of birth: Firouzabad, Iran
- Position: Striker

Team information
- Current team: Nassaji
- Number: 9

Youth career
- Kheibar Firouzabad
- Persepolis Firouzabad
- Pas Firouzabad

Senior career*
Years	Team	Apps	(Gls)
- Pas Shiraz
- Mersad Shiraz
2003–2009	Bargh Shiraz	148	(31)
2009–2010	Rah Ahan	22	(3)
2010–2011	Bargh Shiraz		
2011–	Nassaji		(2)
- * Club domestic league appearances and goals as of 5 June 2010

Farid Abedi (born August 28, 1977, in Firouzabad) is an Iranian footballer. He currently plays for Bargh Shiraz in Azadegan League.

== Club Career Statistics ==
Last Update 5 June 2010

Club performance			League		Cup		Continental		Total	
Season	Club	League	Apps	Goals	Apps	Goals	Apps	Goals	Apps	Goals
Iran			League		Hazfi Cup		Asia		Total	
2003–04	Bargh	Persian Gulf Cup	18	5			-	-		
2004–05	Bargh	Persian Gulf Cup	25	5			-	-		
2005–06	Bargh	Persian Gulf Cup	26	4			-	-		
2006–07	Bargh	Persian Gulf Cup	23	2			-	-		
2007–08	Bargh	Persian Gulf Cup	25	5	2	1	-	-	27	6
2008–09	Bargh	Persian Gulf Cup	31	10			-	-		
2009–10	Rah Ahan	Persian Gulf Cup	22	3	1	0	-	-	23	3
2010–11	Bargh	Division 1		1			-	-		
2011–12	Nassaji	Division 1		6			-	-		
Total	Iran			41			0	0		
Career total				41			0	0		

- Assist Goals

Season	Team	Assists
05–06	Bargh	1
06–07	Bargh	1
09–10	Rah Ahan	1
