= Nader Ghobeishavi =

Iranian footballer

Personal information
- Full name: Nader Ghobeishavi
- Date of birth: September 19, 1975 (age 51)
- Place of birth: Abadan, Iran
- Height: 1.82 m (5 ft 11 1/2 in)
- Position: Goalkeeper

Team information
- Current team: Foolad (goalkeeping coach)

Senior career*
Years	Team	Apps	(Gls)
–2003	Sanat Naft		(0)
2003–2006	Esteghlal Ahvaz	39	(0)
2006–2008	Aboomoslem	29	(0)
2008–2009	Rah Ahan	12	(0)
2009–2010	Esteghlal Ahvaz		(0)
2010–2011	Shahrdari Bandar Abbas		(0)
2011–2012	Mashin Sazi		(0)

International career^{‡}
- Iran U-20

Managerial career
- 2019–: Foolad (goalkeeping coach)
- * Club domestic league appearances and goals as of 1 June 2010 ‡ National team caps and goals as of 5 November 2009

Nader Ghobeishavi (Persian: نادر غبیشاوی; born September 19, 1975), is an Iranian football coach and a former player, who played as a goalkeeper. He currently works as a goalkeeping coach with Foolad in the Iran Pro League.

== Club career ==
Ghobeishavi Previously played for Aboomoslem and Rah Ahan, both of whom participate in Iran Pro League.

Club performance			League		Cup		Continental		Total	
Season	Club	League	Apps	Goals	Apps	Goals	Apps	Goals	Apps	Goals
Iran			League		Hazfi Cup		Asia		Total	
2003–04	Persian Gulf Cup	Esteghlal A.	14	0		0	-	-		0
2004–05	Persian Gulf Cup	Esteghlal A.	0	0		0	-	-		0
2005–06	Persian Gulf Cup	Esteghlal A.	25	0		0	-	-		0
2006–07	Persian Gulf Cup	Aboomoslem	16	0	1	0	-	-	17	0
2007–08	Persian Gulf Cup	Aboomoslem	13	0	0	0	-	-	13	0
2008–09	Persian Gulf Cup	Rah Ahan	12	0		0	-	-		0
2009–10	Persian Gulf Cup	Esteghlal A.	26	0	0	0	-	-	26	0
Total	Iran		106	0		0	0	0		0
Career total			106	0		0	0	0		0

== International ==
In 2003, Ghobeishavi was summoned by Iranian Football Federation to attend a national camp in preparation for the Asian Nations Cup.
