= Ali Peyrovani =

Iranian footballer

Personal information
- Full name: Ali Peyrovani
- Date of birth: March 19, 1988 (age 38)
- Place of birth: Iran
- Position: Defender

Team information
- Current team: Moghavemat
- Number: 23

Senior career*
Years	Team	Apps	(Gls)
2006–2009	Fajr Sepasi	1	(0)
2009–2010	Bargh Shiraz	10	(0)
	Moghavemat	5	(0)
- * Club domestic league appearances and goals

Ali Peyrovani (Persian: علی پیروانی, born 19 March 1988) is an Iranian football defender of Moghavemat Sepasi F.C. He is the son of Iranian football coach, Gholam Hossein Peyrovani.
