= Alireza Jarahkar =

Iranian footballer

Ali Jarahkar
Personal information
- Full name: Ali Jarahkar
- Date of birth: 21 September 1982 (age 44)
- Place of birth: Kermanshah, Iran
- Height: 1.86 m (6 ft 1 in)
- Position: Defender

Senior career*
Years	Team	Apps	(Gls)
2009–2010	Shirin Faraz	39	(3)
2010–2012	Malavan	25	(1)
2012–2013	Zob Ahan	8	(0)
2013–2014	Paykan	14	(1)
2014–2015	Mes Rafsanjan	19	(1)
2015–2016	Machine Sazi	28	(5)
- * Club domestic league appearances and goals as of 20 June 2016

Alireza Jarahkar (born September 21, 1982) is an Iranian footballer.

== Club career ==
Jarahkar joined Malavan in 2010 after spending the previous season with Shirin Faraz. Jarahkar spent the entire 2012–13 on the sidelines, due to injury, and was eventually released by Malavan in December 2012.

=== Club career statistics ===
As of 19 June 2012

Club performance			League	
Season	Club	League	Apps	Goals
Iran			League	
2009–10	Shirin Faraz	Division 1	24	1
2010–11	Malavan	Pro League	21	0
2011–12	Malavan	Pro League	12	2
Total			57	3
