= Vahid Paloch =

Iranian footballer

Personal information
- Full name: Vahid Paloch
- Date of birth: 6 September 1986 (age 40)
- Place of birth: Iran
- Height: 1.77 m (5 ft 9 1/2 in)
- Position: Midfielder

Team information
- Current team: Machine Sazi

Senior career*
Years	Team	Apps	(Gls)
2009–2010	Shamoushak		
2010–2011	Sanat Naft Abadan F.C.	4	(0)
2011–	Machine Sazi	0	(0)
- * Club domestic league appearances and goals as of 5 September 2010 (UTC) ‡ National team caps and goals as of 26 March 2010

Vahid Paloch (born September 6, 1986) is an Iranian footballer who plays for Machine Sazi in the Azadegan League vahidbloch47 (vahid)(BLoch)(47)

.

== Club career ==
In 2010, Palouch joined Sanat Naft Abadan F.C. after spending the previous season at Shamoushak in the Azadegan League.

Club performance			League		Cup		Continental		Total	
Season	Club	League	Apps	Goals	Apps	Goals	Apps	Goals	Apps	Goals
Iran			League		Hazfi Cup		Asia		Total	
2009–10	Shamoushak	Azadegan League	?	0	0	0	-	-		0
2010–11	Sanat Naft Abadan F.C.	Persian Gulf Cup	4	0	0	0	-	-	4	0
2011–12	Machine Sazi	Azadegan League	0	0	0	0	-	-	0	0
Total	Iran			0	0	0	0	0		0
Career total				0	0	0	0	0		0

- Assists

Season	Team	Assists
2010–11	Sanat Naft Abadan F.C.	0
