= Hamid Hedayati =

Iranian footballer

Personal information
- Full name: Hamid Hedayati
- Date of birth: 11 March 1976 (age 50)
- Place of birth: Iran
- Position: Midfielder

Senior career*
Years	Team	Apps	(Gls)
2001–2007	Pas	?	(5)
2007–2008	Payam	?	(1)
2008–2010	Peykan	47	(1)
2010	Rah Ahan	6	(1)
2010–	Kaveh Tehran		
- * Club domestic league appearances and goals as of 6 October 2010 ‡ National team caps and goals as of 18 May 2010

Hamid Hedayati (born 11 March 1976) is an Iranian football player who currently plays for Rah Ahan of the Iran Pro League.

== Club career ==
Hedayati joined Paykan F.C. in 2008 after spending the previous season at Payam Mashhad F.C. in the Azadegan League

=== Club career statistics ===
As of 6 October 2010

Club performance			League		Cup		Continental		Total	
Season	Club	League	Apps	Goals	Apps	Goals	Apps	Goals	Apps	Goals
Iran			League		Hazfi Cup		Asia		Total	
2001–02	Pas	Persian Gulf Cup		2			-	-		
2002–03	Pas	Persian Gulf Cup		1			-	-		
2003–04	Pas	Persian Gulf Cup		1			-	-		
2004–05	Pas	Persian Gulf Cup	21	1				0		
2005–06	Pas	Persian Gulf Cup	2	0			-	-		
2006–07	Pas	Persian Gulf Cup	22	0			-	-		
2007–08	Payam	Azadegan League		1			-	-		
2008–09	Paykan	Persian Gulf Cup	16	0	1	0	-	-	17	0
2009–10	Paykan	Persian Gulf Cup	31	1			-	-		
2010–11	Rah Ahan	Persian Gulf Cup	6	1	0	0	-	-	6	1
Total	Iran			8				0		
Career total				8				0		

- Assist Goals

Season	Team	Assists
06–07	Pas	1
08–09	Paykan	3
09–10	Paykan	2
10–11	Rah Ahan	1
