= Maximiliano Vallejo =

Argentine footballer

Personal information
- Full name: Maximiliano Alberto Vallejo Gómez
- Date of birth: 24 April 1982 (age 44)
- Place of birth: Buenos Aires, Argentina
- Height: 1.91 m (6 ft 3 in)
- Position: Striker

Team information
- Current team: Nacional Potosí
- Number: 11

Senior career*
Years	Team	Apps	(Gls)
2002–2003	Independiente	0	(0)
2005	CA Cerro	9	(?)
2006–2007	Persela Lamongan		
2008–2009	Budućnost Podgorica	3	(0)
2010	Bella Vista		
2010–2012	Sh. Bandar Abbas		
2012–	Nacional Potosí	27	(5)
- * Club domestic league appearances and goals as of 25 September 2010 ‡ National team caps and goals as of 25 September 2010

Maximiliano Vallejo (born 24 April 1982) is an Argentine professional football player currently playing for Nacional Potosí in the Liga de Fútbol Profesional Boliviano.

== Career ==
Prior to moving to Iran in 2010, Vallejo played for Club Atlético Independiente however without making a single appearance in the Argentine Primera División, then top league side C.A. Cerro from Uruguay, Persela Lamongan in the Indonesia Super League, FK Budućnost Podgorica in the Montenegrin First League and Bella Vista de Bahía Blanca playing in Torneo Argentino B.
