= Ali Haghdoost =

Iranian footballer

Personal information
- Date of birth: 6 August 1985 (age 41)
- Place of birth: Mashhad, Iran
- Height: 1.73 m (5 ft 8 in)
- Position: Midfielder

Youth career
- –2005: Aboomoslem

Senior career*
Years	Team	Apps	(Gls)
2005–2010	Aboomoslem	95	(0)
2010–2012	Saipa	24	(0)
2012–2014	Aboomoslem		
2014	Iranjavan	8	(0)
2015	Mes Kerman	3	(0)
2015–2016	Khooneh Be Khooneh	35	(0)
2016–2017	Baadraan	8	(0)
2017	Iranjavan	15	(0)
2017–2018	Machine Sazi	9	(0)
2018	Siah Jamegan		
2018–2019	Iranjavan		
2019–2020	Damash Gilan	5	(0)
- * Club domestic league appearances and goals

Ali Haghdoost (Persian: علی حق دوست; born 6 August 1985) is an Iranian former footballer.

== Club career ==
Haghdoost joined Saipa in 2010, after spending the previous 5 seasons at Aboomoslem.

Club performance			League		Cup		Continental		Total	
Season	Club	League	Apps	Goals	Apps	Goals	Apps	Goals	Apps	Goals
Iran			League		Hazfi Cup		Asia		Total	
2006–07	Aboomoslem	Persian Gulf Cup	13	0			-	-		
2007–08	Aboomoslem	Persian Gulf Cup	28	0	2	0	-	-	30	0
2008–09	Aboomoslem	Persian Gulf Cup	25	0	2	0	-	-	27	2
2009–10	Aboomoslem	Persian Gulf Cup	28	0			-	-		
2010–11	Saipa	Persian Gulf Cup	9	0	1	0	-	-	10	0
Total	Iran		103	0			0	0		
Career total			103	0			0	0		

- Assist Goals

Season	Team	Assists
2010–11	Saipa	0
