= Majid Gholami =

Iranian footballer (born 1985)

Personal information
- Full name: Majid Gholami
- Date of birth: 1 January 1985 (age 41)
- Place of birth: Sanandaj, Iran
- Position: Goalkeeper

Senior career*
Years	Team	Apps	(Gls)
2007–2008	Esteghlal Ahvaz	9	(0)
2008–2009	Payam Khorasan	15	(0)
2009–2010	Aboomoslem Khorasan	26	(0)
2010–2012	Shahin Bushehr	20	(0)
2012–2013	Gol Gohar Sirjan	24	(0)
2013–2014	Giti Pasand Isfahan	21	(0)
2014–2018	Gol Gohar Sirjan	65	(0)
2018–2019	Arman Gohar Sirjan	28	(0)
- * Club domestic league appearances and goals as of 23 July 2010 (UTC)

Majid Gholami (Persian: مجید غلامی; born January 1, 1985) is an Iranian footballer who plays for Gol Gohar in the Azadegan League.

== Club career ==
Gholami joined Shahin Bushehr F.C. in 2010 after spending the previous season at Aboomoslem. In 2012 after Shahin's relegation to Azadegan League he moved to Gol Gohar Sirjan.

Club performance			League	
Season	Club	League	Apps	Goals
Iran			League	
2007–08	Esteghlal Ahvaz	Pro League	9	0
2008–09	Payam	Pro League	15	0
2009–10	Aboomoslem	Pro League	26	0
2010–11	Shahin	Pro League	19	0
2011–12	Shahin	Pro League	1	0
Total	Iran		70	0
Career total			70	0

== Honours ==
=== Club ===
- Hazfi Cup
  - Runner up:1
    - 2011–12 with Shahin Bushehr
