= Alireza Jalili =

Iranian footballer

Personal information
- Full name: Alireza Jalili Loghman
- Date of birth: 9 February 1979 (age 47)
- Place of birth: Iran
- Position: Defender

Senior career*
Years	Team	Apps	(Gls)
2008–2009	Shahrdari Tabriz		
2009–2011	Tractor Sazi	50	(0)
2011–2012	PAS Hamedan	25	(3)
2012	Tractor Sazi	0	(0)
- * Club domestic league appearances and goals as of 25 September 2010 ‡ National team caps and goals as of 25 September 2010

Alireza Jalili Loghman (born February 9, 1979) is an Iranian professional football player last played for Tractor Sazi in the Iran Pro League.

== Career ==
Salimi played for Shahrdari Tabriz before moving to Tractor Sazi in the summer of 2009.

Club performance			League		Cup		Continental		Total	
Season	Club	League	Apps	Goals	Apps	Goals	Apps	Goals	Apps	Goals
Iran			League		Hazfi Cup		Asia		Total	
2009–10	Tractor Sazi	Iran Pro League	22	0		0	0	0		0
2010–11	Tractor Sazi	Iran Pro League	28	0		0	-	-		0
Total	Iran		50	0		0	0	0		0
Career total			50	0		0	0	0		0

== External sources ==
- Profile at Persianleague
