= Alireza Mirshafian =

Iranian football midfielder (born 1978)

Personal information
- Full name: Alireza Mirshafian
- Date of birth: 8 March 1978 (age 48)
- Place of birth: Iran
- Position: Defender

Team information
- Current team: Paykan

Senior career*
Years	Team	Apps	(Gls)
2007–2008	Esteghlal Ahvaz	1	(0)
2007	→ Sanaye Arak (loan)	20	(1)
2008–2010	Tractor Sazi	30	(1)
2010–2011	Saba Qom	6	(0)
2011–2012	Pas Hamedan	0	(0)
2012–	Paykan	0	(0)
- * Club domestic league appearances and goals as of 3 October 2010

Alireza Mirshafian (born 8 March 1978) is an Iranian football midfielder who played for Paykan in the Iran Pro League.

== Club career ==
Mirshafian joined Tractor Sazi F.C. in 2008.

Club performance			League		Cup		Continental		Total	
Season	Club	League	Apps	Goals	Apps	Goals	Apps	Goals	Apps	Goals
Iran			League		Hazfi Cup		Asia		Total	
2007–08	Esteghlal Ahvaz	Persian Gulf Cup	1	0			-	-		
2008–09	Tractor Sazi	Azadegan		1			-	-		
2009–10	Tractor Sazi	Persian Gulf Cup	30	0			-	-		
2010–11	Saba	Persian Gulf Cup	6	0	1	0	-	-	7	0
2011–12	Pas Hamedan	Azadegan League	0	0	0	0	-	-	0	0
Total	Iran			1			0	0		
Career total				1			0	0		

- Assist Goals

Season	Team	Assists
09–10	Tractor Sazi	1
10–11	Saba	0
