= Saeed Khani =

Iranian footballer

Personal information
- Full name: Saeed Khani
- Date of birth: January 21, 1981 (age 45)
- Place of birth: Nishapur, Iran
- Position: Midfielder

Youth career
- Payam Khorasan

Senior career*
Years	Team	Apps	(Gls)
1999–2003	Payam Khorasan	63	(2)
2003–2004	Esteghlal Ahvaz	17	(1)
2004–2010	Aboumoslem	99	(15)
2010–2011	Saba Qom	21	(0)
2011–2012	Aboumoslem	20	(0)
2012–2013	Shahin Bushehr	12	(0)
- * Club domestic league appearances and goals as of 3 October 2010

Saeed Khani (born January 21, 1981) is a former Iranian footballer.

== Club career ==
Khani has spent a significant portion of his career playing for F.C. Aboumoslem. He currently serves as the captain of his team.

=== Club career statistics ===
Club performance			League		Cup		Continental		Total	
Season	Club	League	Apps	Goals	Apps	Goals	Apps	Goals	Apps	Goals
Iran			League		Hazfi Cup		Asia		Total	
2004–05	Esteghlal Ahvaz	Persian Gulf Cup		1			-	-		
2005–06	Aboumoslem	Persian Gulf Cup	8	3			-	-		
2006–07	Aboumoslem	Persian Gulf Cup	16	2			-	-		
2007–08	Aboumoslem	Persian Gulf Cup	21	2	2	1	-	-	22	3
2008–09	Aboumoslem	Persian Gulf Cup	28	2			-	-		
2009–10	Aboumoslem	Persian Gulf Cup	26	4			-	-		
2010–11	Saba Qom	Persian Gulf Cup	20	0	1	0	-	-	21	0
2011–12	Aboumoslem	Azadegan League	0	0	0	0	-	-	0	0
Total	Iran			16			0	0		
Career total				16			0	0		

- Assist Goals

Season	Team	Assists
05–06	Aboumoslem	2
09–10	Aboumoslem	1
10–11	Saba	1
