= Esmaeil Bale =

Iranian footballer

Personal information
- Full name: Esmaeil Bale Moghadasi
- Date of birth: 16 September 1985 (age 41)
- Place of birth: Nowshahr, Iran
- Position: Defender

Team information
- Current team: Etka Gorgan

Youth career
- –2004: Shamoushak Noshahr F.C.

Senior career*
Years	Team	Apps	(Gls)
2004–2008	Shamoushak Noshahr	?	(0)
2008–2009	Mes Rafsanjan	?	(0)
2009–2010	Etka Gorgan	26	(3)
2010–	Sanat Sari	9	(2)
- * Club domestic league appearances and goals as of 26 April 2010 (UTC) ‡ National team caps and goals as of 2 April 2010

Esmaeil Bale (born 16 September 1985) is an Iranian footballer who plays for Etka Gorgan F.C. in the Azadegan League.

== Club career ==
Bale joined Etka Gorgan F.C. in 2009 after spending the previous season at Mes Rafsanjan F.C. He was also a member of Shamoushak Noshahr F.C. team who gained promotion into The Iranian Premier League in 2005.

=== Statistics ===
Season	Team	Country	Division	Apps	Goals	Assists
09/10	Etka Gorgan	Iran	2	26	3	0
10/11	Sanat Sari	Iran	2	9	2	0
