= Obaji Sunday =

Nigerian footballer

Ubah Chike Sunday
Personal information
- Full name: Ubah Chike Sunday
- Date of birth: August 1, 1988 (age 38)
- Place of birth: Lagos, Nigeria
- Position: Midfielder

Team information
- Current team: Sitra Club
- Number: 32

Youth career
- 2002–2006: Pepsi Football Academy

Senior career*
Years	Team	Apps	(Gls)
2006–2007	Foolad F.C.	15	(0)
2007–2009	Aluminium Hormozgan F.C.	48	(8)
2009–2010	Shahin Bushehr F.C.	33	(2)
2010–2011	Iranjavan F.C.	20	(5)
2011–2014	Shahrdari Yasuj F.C.	18	(3)
2015	Sitra Club		
- * Club domestic league appearances and goals as of June 13, 2012

Ubah Chike Sunday (born August 1, 1988) is a Nigerian-born footballer who currently plays for Shahrdari Yasuj F.C in the Azadegan League.

== Club career ==
Sunday joined Shahin Bushehr F.C. in 2009 before then he played for Foolad F.C., Aluminium Hormozgan F.C. and Iranjavan F.C. all in Iran.

== National team ==
Sunday played for Nigeria national under 17 and under 20 teams respectively.

Club performance			League		Cup		Continental		Total	
Season	Club	League	Apps	Goals	Apps	Goals	Apps	Goals	Apps	Goals
Iran			League		Hazfi Cup		Asia		Total	
2009–10	Shahin	Persian Gulf Cup	32	5			-	-		
2010–11	Iranjavan	Azadegan League	21	5			-	-		
Total	Iran		53	10			0	0		
Career total			53	37			0	0		

- Assist Goals

Season	Team	Assists
09/10	Shahin	5
