= Mohammad Savari =

Iranian footballer

Personal information
- Full name: Mohammad Savari
- Date of birth: February 13, 1985 (age 41)
- Place of birth: Iran
- Position: Goalkeeper

Team information
- Current team: Nassaji

Youth career
- Sepahan

Senior career*
Years	Team	Apps	(Gls)
2006–2011	Sepahan	11	(0)
2008–2009	→ Foulad (loan)		
2009–2010	→ Sepahan Novin (loan)		
2011–	Nassaji	1	(0)
- * Club domestic league appearances and goals as of 15 September 2008

Mohammad Savari (Persian: محمد سواری, born February 13, 1985) is an Iranian football goalkeeper who currently plays for Sepahan F.C. in the Iran Pro League. he was linked to play for Esteghlal Ahvaz in 2008–2009 on loan, but he was not moved to the club. instead, he went on loan to its rival club Foulad.

== Club career ==
=== Club career statistics ===
As of 25 August 2010

Club performance			League		Cup		Continental		Total	
Season	Club	League	Apps	Goals	Apps	Goals	Apps	Goals	Apps	Goals
Iran			League		Hazfi Cup		Asia		Total	
2006–07	Sepahan	Pro League	4	0	?	0	?	0	?	0
2007–08	Sepahan	Pro League	6	0	?	0	0	0	?^{1}	0
2008–09	Foulad	Division 1					—			
2009–10	Sepahan Novin	Division 1					—			
2010–11	Sepahan	Pro League	1	0	0	0	0	0	0	0
Career total										

^{1} includes 2 matches in FIFA Club World Cup 2007.

== Honours ==
=== Club ===
- Iran's Premier Football League
  - Winner: 2
    - 2009/10 with Sepahan
    - 2010/11 with Sepahan
  - Runner up: 1
    - 2007/08 with Sepahan
- Hazfi Cup
  - Winner: 1
    - 2006/07 with Sepahan
- Asian Champions League
  - Runner up: 1
    - 2007 with Sepahan
