= Mohammad Azizi =

Iranian footballer (born 1988)

Personal information
- Full name: Mohammad Azizi
- Date of birth: 13 January 1988 (age 38)
- Place of birth: Iran
- Height: 1.84 m (6 ft 1/2 in)
- Position: Midfielder

Senior career*
| Years | Team | Apps | (Gls) |
| 2007–2010 | Mes Rafsanjan | ? | (22) |
| 2010– | Sanat Naft | 1 | (0) |
- * Club domestic league appearances and goals as of 5 September 2010 (UTC) ‡ National team caps and goals as of 15 August 2010

Mohammad Azizi (Persian: محمد عزیزی; born January 13, 1988) is an Iranian footballer. He currently plays for Sanat Naft Abadan F.C. in the IPL.

== Club career ==
In 2010, Azizi joined Sanat Naft Abadan F.C. after spending the previous season at Mes Rafsanjan in the Azadegan League.

| Club performance | | | League | | Cup | | Continental | | Total | |
| Season | Club | League | Apps | Goals | Apps | Goals | Apps | Goals | Apps | Goals |
| Iran | | | League | | Hazfi Cup | | Asia | | Total | |
|---|---|---|---|---|---|---|---|---|---|---|
| 2007–08 | Mes Rafsanjan | Azadegan | | 8 | | | - | - | | |
| 2008–09 | Mes Rafsanjan | Azadegan | | 8 | | | - | - | | |
| 2009–10 | Mes Rafsanjan | Azadegan | 26 | 6 | | | - | - | | |
| 2010–11 | Sanat Naft | Persian Gulf Cup | 1 | 0 | 0 | 0 | - | - | 1 | 0 |
| Total | Iran | | | 22 | | | 0 | 0 | | |
| Career total | | | | 22 | | | 0 | 0 | | |

- Assist Goals

| Season | Team | Assists |
|---|---|---|
| 2010–11 | Sanat Naft | 0 |
