= Vahid Nemati =

Iranian footballer (born 1988)

Personal information
- Full name: Vahid Nemati
- Date of birth: May 28, 1988 (age 38)
- Place of birth: Iran
- Position: Midfielder

Team information
- Current team: Aluminium Arak F.C.

Senior career*
Years	Team	Apps	(Gls)
2009–2010	Shamoushak	24	(2)
2010–2011	Saba Qom	15	(0)
2011–2012	Fajr Sepasi	10	(0)
2012–2013	Shahin Bushehr	17	(0)
2013–2014	Iranjavan	20	(1)
2014–2015	Foolad Yazd	19	(1)
2015–2016	Aluminium Arak	7	(0)
- * Club domestic league appearances and goals as of 1 October 2015 (UTC)

Vahid Nemati (Persian: وحید نعمتی; born May 28, 1988) is an Iranian footballer who plays for Aluminium Arak in the Persian Gulf Pro League.

== Club career ==
Club performance			League		Cup		Continental		Total	
Season	Club	League	Apps	Goals	Apps	Goals	Apps	Goals	Apps	Goals
Iran			League		Hazfi Cup		Asia		Total	
2009–10	Shamoushak	Division 1	24	2			-	-		
2010–11	Saba Qom	Pro League	8	0	0	0	-	-	8	0
2011–12	Fajr Sepasi	Pro League	17	0	0	0	-	-	17	0
Career total			32	2			0	0		

- Assist Goals

Season	Team	Assists
2010–11	Saba Qom F.C.	0
2012–13	Shahin Bushehr F.C.	TBA
2013–14	Iranjavan F.C.	TBA
2014–15	Foolad Yazd F.C.	TBA
2015–16	Aluminium Arak F.C.	TBA
