= Jafar Bazri =

Iranian footballer (born 1987)

Personal information
- Full name: Jafar Bazri
- Date of birth: 16 August 1987 (age 39)
- Place of birth: Iran
- Position: Striker

Youth career
- –2009: Damash Lorestan

Senior career*
Years	Team	Apps	(Gls)
2009–2010	Damash Lorestan	?	(1)
2010–2011	Foolad Yazd	?	(9)
2011–2012	Shahrdari Tabriz	23	(7)
2012–	Aluminium	56	(12)
- * Club domestic league appearances and goals as of 10 May 2013

Jafar Bazri (born 16 August 1987) is an Iranian footballer.

== Club career ==
Bazri joined Aluminium in 2012 after spending the previous season at Shahrdari Tabriz. He stayed with Aluminium after the team got relegated to the Azadegan League.

Club performance			League		Cup		Continental		Total	
Season	Club	League	Apps	Goals	Apps	Goals	Apps	Goals	Apps	Goals
Iran			League		Hazfi Cup		Asia		Total	
2008–09	Damash Lorestan	Division 1	?	1			-	-		
2009–10	Foolad Yazd	Division 1	?	9			-	-		
2010–11	Shahrdari Tabriz	Pro League	23	7			-	-		
2011–12	Aluminium	Pro League	1	0	0	0	-	-	0	0
Career total				17			0	0		
