= Naser Azarkeyvan =

Iranian footballer

Personal information
- Full name: Naser Azarkeyvan
- Place of birth: Iran
- Position: Midfielder

Team information
- Current team: Paykan

Youth career
- –2008: Saipa

Senior career*
Years	Team	Apps	(Gls)
2008–2009	Saipa	0	(0)
2009–2010	→ Gostaresh (loan)	5	(0)
2010–	Paykan	5	(0)
- * Club domestic league appearances and goals as of August 29, 2010 (UTC) ‡ National team caps and goals as of August 10, 2010

Naser Azarkeyvan is an Iranian footballer who plays for Paykan in the IPL.

== Club career ==
Azarkeyvan joined Paykan in 2009 after spending the previous season at Gostaresh Foolad on loan from Saipa.

Club performance			League		Cup		Continental		Total	
Season	Club	League	Apps	Goals	Apps	Goals	Apps	Goals	Apps	Goals
Iran			League		Hazfi Cup		Asia		Total	
2008–09	Saipa	Persian Gulf Cup	0	0			0	0		
2009–10	Gostaresh	Azadegan League	5	0			-	-		
2010–11	Paykan	Persian Gulf Cup	5	0	0	0	-	-	5	0
Total	Iran		10	0			0	0		
Career total			10	0			0	0		

- Assist Goals

Season	Team	Assists
10-11	Paykan	0
