= Javad Razzaghi =

Iranian professional footballer (born 1982)

Personal information
- Full name: Javad Razzaghi
- Date of birth: 28 November 1982 (age 43)
- Place of birth: Tehran, Iran
- Height: 1.85 m (6 ft 1 in)
- Position: Midfielder

Team information
- Current team: Shahrdari
- Number: 7

Youth career
- 2001–2002: Persepolis

Senior career*
Years	Team	Apps	(Gls)
2002–2003	Dunajská Streda	15	(0)
2004	Sturm Graz	0	(0)
2004–2005	Admira Wacker Mödling	2	(0)
2005–2006	Pas	0	(0)
2006–2009	Aboomoslem	50	(0)
2009–2010	Esteghlal Ahvaz	10	(1)
2010–	Shahrdari Bandar Abbas		
- * Club domestic league appearances and goals as of 28 April 2010

Javad Razzaghi (Persian: جواد رزاقی; born 28 November 1982 in Tehran) is an Iranian professional footballer who currently plays for Shahrdari Bandar Abbas in the Azadegan League.

== Club career ==
=== Club career statistics ===
Last Update 13 May 2022

Club performance			League		Cup		Continental		Total	
Season	Club	League	Apps	Goals	Apps	Goals	Apps	Goals	Apps	Goals
Slovakia			League		Slovak Cup		Europe		Total	
2002–03	Dunajská Streda	2. Liga	15	0			-	-		
Austria			League		Austrian Cup		Europe		Total	
2003–04	Sturm Graz	Austrian Bundesliga	0	0	2	0	-	-	2	0
2004–05	Admira Wacker	Austrian Bundesliga	2	0	-	-	-	-	2	0
Iran			League		Hazfi Cup		Asia		Total	
2005–06	Pas	Persian Gulf Cup	0	0				0		
2006–07	Aboomoslem	Persian Gulf Cup	24	1			-	-		
2007–08	Aboomoslem	Persian Gulf Cup	9	0			-	-		
2008–09	Aboomoslem	Persian Gulf Cup	17	0	1	0	-	-	18	1
2009–10	Esteghlal Ahvaz	Persian Gulf Cup	10	1		0	-	-		1
Total	Iran			2				0		
Total	Slovakia		15	0			0	0		
Total	Austria		2	0				0		
Career total				2				0		

- Assist Goals

Season	Team	Assists
09–10	Esteghlal Ahvaz	0
