= Daniel (footballer, born 1981) =

Brazilian footballer

Personal information
- Full name: Daniel Luiz Flumignan
- Date of birth: 4 June 1981 (age 45)
- Place of birth: São Paulo, Brazil
- Position: Goalkeeper

Team information
- Current team: São Bernardo (director of football)

Youth career
- 2002: Portuguesa

Senior career*
Years	Team	Apps	(Gls)
2003	Portuguesa	0	(0)
2004–2005	Cuiabá		
2006	Mixto		
2006–2007	Bragança	7	(0)
2007	Operário Ltda		
2007–2008	Ituiutaba		
2008	Anápolis	1	(0)
2009	São José-SP		
2009	Cuiabá		
2010	Caldense	1	(0)
2010	Ituiutaba	4	(0)
2011	Nassaji Mazandaran		
2011	ASA		
2011–2012	Boa Esporte	6	(0)
2013–2018	São Bernardo	57	(0)
2016	→ Boa Esporte (loan)	23	(0)
2017	→ Boa Esporte (loan)	9	(0)
2018–2019	América de Natal	3	(0)
- * Club domestic league appearances and goals

Daniel Luiz Flumignan simply known as Daniel (born 4 June 1981) is a Brazilian retired footballer who played as a goalkeeper. He is the current director of football of São Bernardo Futebol Clube.

Daniel previously played for G.D. Bragança in the Portuguese Second Division, Mixto Esporte Clube, Operário Futebol Clube (Várzea Grande), Ituiutaba Esporte Clube, Boa Esporte Clube in Brazil.

Daniel was the goalkeeper for Ituiutaba, during their championship run in the 2007 Taça Minas Gerais. Following the club's 2007 title, Ituiutaba earned a place in the Copa do Brasil 2008, where Daniel made two appearances. He also played regularly for Ituiutaba during the 2008 Campeonato Mineiro.
