= Foolad Natanz F.C. =

Iranian football club

Foolad Natanz
- Full name: Foolad Natanz Football Club
- Founded: 2010
- Dissolved: 2011
- Ground: Shahid Manouchehri; Natanz; Iran
- Capacity: 5,000
- Chairman: Dr. Bahrami
- Head Coach: Ali Reza Raadi
- League: Azadegan League
- 2010–11: Inaugural Season
Home colours	Away colours

Foolad Natanz Football Club is an Iranian football club based in Natanz, Iran. In 2010, the license of Sepahan Novin Football Club was bought by Foolad Natanz.

They competed in the 2010–11 Azadegan League.

== Season-by-season ==
The table below chronicles the achievements of the Club in various competitions.

Season	League	Position	Hazfi Cup	Notes
2010–11	Azadegan League	14th	5th Round	Relegated

== See also ==
- Sepahan Novin F.C.
- Sepahan F.C.
