= List of Iranian football transfers summer 2011 =

This is a list of Iranian football transfers for the 2011 summer transfer window. Only moves featuring at least one Iran Pro League or Azadegan League club are listed.

The summer transfer window opened on 9 June 2011 and was closed at midnight on 23 July 2011. Players without a club may join one at any time, either during or in between transfer windows. Clubs can also sign players on loan at any point during the season. If need be, clubs may sign a goalkeeper on an emergency loan, if all others are unavailable.

== Iran Pro League ==
=== Damash Gilan ===
In: Note: Flags indicate national team as defined under FIFA eligibility rules; some limited exceptions apply. Players may hold more than one non-FIFA nationality.

| No. | Pos. | Nation | Player |
|---|---|---|---|
| 7 | MF | IRN | Milad Zanidpour (from Steel Azin) |
| 19 | FW | IRN | Farzad Mohammadi (from Naft MS) |
| 27 | MF | IRN | Hossein Ebrahimi (from Free agent) |
| 21 | DF | IRN | Abouzar Rahimi (from Rah Ahan) |
| 9 | FW | IRN | Mohammad Gholami (from Steel Azin) |
| 4 | MF | IRN | Abbas Aghaei (from Gostaresh Foolad) |
| 6 | MF | IRN | Jahangir Asgari (from Peykan) |
| 14 | MF | BRA | Magno (from (Brazil) Santo André) |
| 22 | GK | IRN | Mohammad Mohammadi (from Esteghlal) |
| 2 | DF | IRN | Mehdi Mahdavikia (from Steel Azin) |
| 5 | DF | BRA | Orestes Junior Alves (from (Portugal) Naval) |
| 1 | GK | IRN | Milad Farahani (from Paykan) |
| 17 | MF | IRN | Siamak Sarlak (from Foolad) |
| 25 | DF | IRN | Milad Nosrati (from Gahar Zagros) |
| 28 | MF | IRN | Afshin Esmaeilizadeh (from Gahar Zagros) |

Out: Note: Flags indicate national team as defined under FIFA eligibility rules; some limited exceptions apply. Players may hold more than one non-FIFA nationality.

| No. | Pos. | Nation | Player |
|---|---|---|---|
| 24 | FW | MNE | Admir Adrović (to (Montenegro) FK Budućnost) |
| 1 | GK | IRN | Ali Nazarmohammadi (to Pas Hamedan) |
| 23 | MF | IRN | Ali Amiri (released then to Rah Ahan) |
| 6 | MF | IRN | Masoud Mikaeili (to Pas Hamedan) |
| 7 | MF | IRN | Hadi Sohrabi (released then to Nassaji Mazandaran) |
| 28 | MF | ARM | Hamlet Mkhitaryan (released then to Damash Tehran) |
| 21 | DF | IRN | Sepehr Mohammad Sadegh (released) |
| 2 | DF | IRN | Ali Mohamad Dehghan (released) |
| 30 | GK | MNE | Miloš Radanović (released) |
| 9 | MF | IRN | Amin Torkashvand (to Damash Tehran) |

=== Esteghlal ===
In: Note: Flags indicate national team as defined under FIFA eligibility rules; some limited exceptions apply. Players may hold more than one non-FIFA nationality.

| No. | Pos. | Nation | Player |
|---|---|---|---|
| 13 | MF | IRQ | Karrar Jassim (from Tractor Sazi) |
| 40 | DF | IRN | Ali Hamoudi (from Foolad) |
| 16 | DF | IRN | Meysam Hosseini (from Gostaresh Foolad) |
| 1 | GK | IRN | Mehdi Rahmati (from Sepahan) |
| 14 | MF | IRN | Andranik Teymourian (from Tractor Sazi) |
| 4 | DF | IRN | Hamid Azizadeh (from Aluminium Hormozgan) |
| 15 | MF | KUW | Waleed Ali (from Al Kuwait) |
| 21 | GK | IRN | Mehrdad Hosseini (from Persepolis) |
| 32 | MF | IRN | Ferydoon Zandi (from Steel Azin) |
| 2 | MF | IRN | Khosro Heydari (from Sepahan) |
| 22 | GK | IRN | Hadi Zarrin Saed (from Machine Sazi) |

Out: Note: Flags indicate national team as defined under FIFA eligibility rules; some limited exceptions apply. Players may hold more than one non-FIFA nationality.

| No. | Pos. | Nation | Player |
|---|---|---|---|
| 18 | DF | IRN | Mehrshad Momeni (to (United States) Los Angeles Blues) |
| 16 | DF | BRA | André Luiz de Oliveira Regatieri (released, to (Brazil) J. Malucelli) |
| 32 | MF | IRN | Iman Mobali (to (United Arab Emirates) Sharjah) |
| 22 | GK | IRN | Mohammad Mohammadi (to Damash Gilan) |
| 6 | DF | IRN | Hadi Shakouri (to Shahin Bushehr) |
| 17 | MF | IRN | Farzad Ashoubi (to Tractor Sazi) |
| 12 | FW | IRN | Mehdi Seyed-Salehi (to Sepahan) |
| 2 | DF | IRN | Amir Hossein Sadeghi (to Tractor Sazi) |
| 1 | GK | IRN | Vahid Talebloo (to Shahin Bushehr) |
| 5 | DF | IRN | Bijan Koushki (to Mes Kerman) |
| 20 | MF | BRA | Felipe Alves de Souza (to Zob Ahan) |
| 23 | MF | IRN | Omid Ravankhah (to Saipa) |
| 15 | MF | IRN | Yaghoub Karimi (to Naft Tehran) |
| 11 | MF | IRQ | Hawar Mulla Mohammed (to Zob Ahan) |
| 26 | DF | IRN | Fardin Abedini (to Tractor Sazi) |

=== Fajr Sepasi ===
In: Note: Flags indicate national team as defined under FIFA eligibility rules; some limited exceptions apply. Players may hold more than one non-FIFA nationality.

| No. | Pos. | Nation | Player |
|---|---|---|---|
| 21 | FW | IRN | Hakim Hazbaeipour (from Tarbiat Yazd) |
| 17 | DF | IRN | Abbas Kazemian (from Aluminium Hormozgan) |
| 5 | MF | IRN | Hadi Imani (from Steel Azin) |
| 6 | MF | IRN | Saeed Ghezelagchi (from Saipa) |
| 25 | GK | IRN | Mohammad Saleh Khalil Azad (from Rah Ahan) |
| 30 | MF | IRN | Mehdi Rajabzadeh (from Zob Ahan) |
| 16 | GK | IRN | Vahid Sheikhveisi (to Fajr Sepasi) |
| 24 | DF | IRN | Majid Heydari (from Pas Hamedan) |
| 27 | MF | IRN | Vahid Nemati (from Saba Qom) |

Out: Note: Flags indicate national team as defined under FIFA eligibility rules; some limited exceptions apply. Players may hold more than one non-FIFA nationality.

| No. | Pos. | Nation | Player |
|---|---|---|---|
| — | MF | IRN | Soroush Rafaei (to Foolad) |
| — | MF | IRN | Iman Mousavi (to Naft Tehran) |

=== Foolad ===
In: Note: Flags indicate national team as defined under FIFA eligibility rules; some limited exceptions apply. Players may hold more than one non-FIFA nationality.

| No. | Pos. | Nation | Player |
|---|---|---|---|
| 22 | GK | IRN | Mohammad Rashid Mazaheri (from Esteghlal Ahvaz) |
| 17 | MF | IRN | Soroush Rafaei (from Fajr Sepasi) |
| 13 | MF | IRN | Amir Sharafi (from Esteghlal Ahvaz) |
| 16 | FW | IRN | Hakim Nasari (from Naft Masjed Soleyman) |
| 21 | FW | IRN | Omid Khaledi (from Niroye Zamini) |
| 6 | MF | IRN | Abdullah Karami (from Shahin Bushehr) |
| 27 | FW | IRN | Amin Motevaselzadeh (from Rah Ahan) |
| 31 | DF | IRN | Abbas Yahya Beigi (from Hamyari Arak) |
| 26 | MF | IRN | Sasan Ansari (from Foolad U23) |
| 18 | | IRN | Kheyrollah Veisi (from Moghavemat Tehran) |
| 1 | GK | IRN | Saman Safa (from Pas Hamedan) |
| 3 | DF | IRQ | Samal Saeed (from (Iraq) Najaf FC) |

Out: Note: Flags indicate national team as defined under FIFA eligibility rules; some limited exceptions apply. Players may hold more than one non-FIFA nationality.

| No. | Pos. | Nation | Player |
|---|---|---|---|
| 1 | GK | IRN | Khaled Shahetavi (Released) |
| 18 | GK | IRN | Misagh Memarzadeh (to Persepolis) |
| 3 | DF | IRN | Mehdi Chamanara (Released) |
| 6 | DF | IRN | Meysam Khosravi (to Naft Tehran) |
| 7 | MF | IRN | Saeed Ramezani (Released) |
| 8 | MF | IRN | Reza Magholi (to Naft Tehran) |
| 23 | MF | IRN | Siamak Sarlak (to Damash Gilan) |
| 40 | MF | IRN | Ali Hamoudi (to Esteghlal) |
| 15 | FW | MLI | Bakary Diakité (Released) |

=== Malavan ===
In: Note: Flags indicate national team as defined under FIFA eligibility rules; some limited exceptions apply. Players may hold more than one non-FIFA nationality.

| No. | Pos. | Nation | Player |
|---|---|---|---|
| 44 | GK | IRN | Iman Sadeghi (from Steel Azin) |
| 28 | DF | IRN | Reza Talabeh (from Foolad Natanz) |
| 17 | MF | IRN | Mohammad Amin Hajmohammadi (from Naft Tehran) |
| 10 | MF | IRN | Jalal Rafkhaei (from Zob Ahan) |
| 14 | FW | MKD | Zoran Zlatkovski (from (Bulgaria) PFC Ludogorets Razgrad) |
| 2 | DF | IRN | Mohammad Ebrahim Khosravi (from Pas Hamedan) |
| 40 | MF | IRN | Saeed Yousefzadeh (from Saipa) |

Out: Note: Flags indicate national team as defined under FIFA eligibility rules; some limited exceptions apply. Players may hold more than one non-FIFA nationality.

| No. | Pos. | Nation | Player |
|---|---|---|---|
| 14 | DF | BIH | Alen Bašić (to Tarbiat Yazd) |
| 17 | MF | IRN | Hossein Ebrahimi (Released then to Damash Gilan) |
| 6 | DF | IRN | Hadi Tamini (to Sepahan) |
| 8 | MF | IRN | Pejman Nouri (to (United Arab Emirates) Emirates Club) |
| 3 | DF | IRN | Abolhassan Jafari (to Sepahan) |
| 12 | FW | IRN | Mehrdad Oladi (to Persepolis) |

=== Mes Kerman ===
In: Note: Flags indicate national team as defined under FIFA eligibility rules; some limited exceptions apply. Players may hold more than one non-FIFA nationality.

| No. | Pos. | Nation | Player |
|---|---|---|---|
| 6 | DF | ARM | Ararat Arakelyan (from (Ukraine) Metalurh Donetsk) |
| 15 | MF | IRN | Ali Marzban (from Foolad Natanz) |
| 7 | MF | IRN | Majid Khodabandelou (from Paykan) |
| 20 | FW | IRN | Mohsen Bayatinia (from Saba Qom) |
| 14 | FW | COL | Carlos Salazar (from Mes Rafsanjan) |
| 4 | DF | IRN | Sepehr Heidari (from Perspolis) |
| 32 | DF | IRN | Bijan Koushki (from Esteghlal) |
| 18 | FW | IRN | Mostafa Shojaei (from Foolad Natanz) |
| 27 | FW | BRA | Leandro Barrios (from (Costa Rica) L.D. Alajuelense) |
| 9 | FW | SWE | George Mourad (from (Portugal) Portimonense) |

Out: Note: Flags indicate national team as defined under FIFA eligibility rules; some limited exceptions apply. Players may hold more than one non-FIFA nationality.

| No. | Pos. | Nation | Player |
|---|---|---|---|
| — | MF | IRN | Javad Rahimi (to Tarbiat Yazd) |
| 4 | DF | BRA | Leandro Fernandes Dias (Released) |
| 6 | DF | IRN | Nabiollah Bagheriha (to Shahrdari Tabriz) |
| 20 | DF | IRN | Pirouz Ghorbani (to Saipa) |
| 7 | MF | IRN | Mohammad Mansouri (to Saipa) |
| 30 | FW | BRA | Edinho (to (United Arab Emirates) Sharjah) |
| 35 | FW | BRA | Paulo Zaltron (Released) |
| — | GK | IRN | Aria Hassanzadeh (to Rah Ahan) |
| — | FW | IRN | Faraz Fatemi (to Mashin Sazi) |

=== Mes Sarcheshmeh ===
In: Note: Flags indicate national team as defined under FIFA eligibility rules; some limited exceptions apply. Players may hold more than one non-FIFA nationality.

| No. | Pos. | Nation | Player |
|---|---|---|---|
| 30 | GK | IRN | Mohammad Khazaei (from Gol Gohar) |
| 11 | MF | IRN | Moslem Firoozabadi (from Gol Gohar) |
| 16 | MF | IRN | Mohsen Zahedi (from Rah Ahan) |
| 3 | DF | IRN | Mojtaba Torshizi (from Tractor Sazi) |
| 7 | FW | IRN | Ali Molaei (from Tractor Sazi) |
| 9 | FW | IRN | Ali Samereh (from Pas Hamedan) |
| 1 | GK | IRN | Hassan Houri (from Sanat Naft) |
| 2 | DF | IRN | Oveis Kordjahan (from Aluminium Hormozgan) |
| 26 | DF | CRO | Ante Zurak (from (Bosnia and Herzegovina) NK Široki Brijeg) |
| 28 | MF | IRN | Vahid Aliabadi (from Pas Hamedan) |

Out: Note: Flags indicate national team as defined under FIFA eligibility rules; some limited exceptions apply. Players may hold more than one non-FIFA nationality.

| No. | Pos. | Nation | Player |
|---|---|---|---|
| — | FW | ARM | Ara Hakobyan (released) |
| — | FW | ARM | Alexander Petrosyan (released) |
| — | GK | ARM | Grigor Meliksetyan (to (Armenia) Gandzasar) |
| — | MF | IRN | Eshagh Sobhani (to Saipa) |

=== Naft Tehran ===
In: Note: Flags indicate national team as defined under FIFA eligibility rules; some limited exceptions apply. Players may hold more than one non-FIFA nationality.

| No. | Pos. | Nation | Player |
|---|---|---|---|
| 16 | DF | IRN | Meysam Khosravi (from Foolad) |
| 11 | FW | IRN | Mojtaba Zarei (from Persepolis) |
| 17 | MF | IRN | Yaghoub Karimi (from Esteghlal) |
| 8 | MF | IRN | Reza Magholi (from Foolad) |
| 40 | GK | IRN | Sosha Makani (from Steel Azin) |
| 26 | MF | IRN | Iman Mousavi (from Fajr Sepasi) |

Out: Note: Flags indicate national team as defined under FIFA eligibility rules; some limited exceptions apply. Players may hold more than one non-FIFA nationality.

| No. | Pos. | Nation | Player |
|---|---|---|---|
| 8 | MF | IRN | Mehdi Mohammadzadeh (to Shahrdari Tabriz) |
| — | MF | IRN | Siamak Koohnavard (to Sanat Naft) |
| — | | IRN | Hamid Falah (to F.C. Aboomoslem) |
| 33 | DF | IRN | Mohammad Amin Hajmohammadi (to Malavan) |
| 30 | GK | IRN | Hossein Ashena (to Saipa) |
| — | MF | IRN | Omid Alishah (to Rah Ahan) |
| — | FW | IRN | Bahman Tahmasbi (to Aluminium Hormozga) |

=== Persepolis ===
In: Note: Flags indicate national team as defined under FIFA eligibility rules; some limited exceptions apply. Players may hold more than one non-FIFA nationality.

| No. | Pos. | Nation | Player |
|---|---|---|---|
| 8 | MF | IRN | Ali Karimi (from (Germany) FC Schalke 04) |
| 6 | DF | IRN | Mohammad Nosrati (from Tractor Sazi) |
| 22 | GK | IRN | Misagh Memarzadeh (from Foolad) |
| 33 | FW | IRN | Mehrdad Oladi (from Malavan) |
| 32 | FW | IRN | Reza Hamzepour (from Persepolis Academy) |
| 30 | MF | BFA | Mamadou Tall (from (Portugal) União Leiria) |
| 17 | FW | IRN | Javad Kazemian (from Sepahan) |

Out: Note: Flags indicate national team as defined under FIFA eligibility rules; some limited exceptions apply. Players may hold more than one non-FIFA nationality.

| No. | Pos. | Nation | Player |
|---|---|---|---|
| 25 | MF | IRN | Mehdi Shiri (Released) |
| 40 | FW | IRN | Saeed Hallafi (to Machine Sazi) |
| 36 | GK | IRN | Rahman Ahmadi (to Sepahan) |
| 3 | DF | IRN | Sepehr Heidari (to Mes Kerman) |
| 8 | FW | GER | Shpejtim Arifi (to Tractor Sazi) |
| 7 | MF | IRN | Mohammad Parvin (to Paykan) |
| 21 | GK | IRN | Mehrdad Hosseini (from Persepolis) |
| 5 | DF | MLI | Sékou Berthé (Released) |
| 27 | MF | BRA | Tiago Alves Fraga (to Pas Hamedan) |
| 30 | FW | IRN | Mojtaba Zarei (to Naft Tehran) |
| 17 | DF | IRN | Jalal Akbari (Released) |

=== Rah Ahan ===
In: Note: Flags indicate national team as defined under FIFA eligibility rules; some limited exceptions apply. Players may hold more than one non-FIFA nationality.

| No. | Pos. | Nation | Player |
|---|---|---|---|
| 13 | DF | IRN | Hossein Kaebi (from Steel Azin) |
| 14 | MF | IRN | Hossein Kazemi (from Steel Azin) |
| 9 | MF | IRN | Sattar Zare (from Shahin Bushehr) |
| 20 | MF | IRN | Saeid Chahjouei (from Aboomoslem) |
| 18 | MF | IRN | Ali Amiri (from Damash Gilan) |
| 27 | MF | IRN | Ali Gholam (from Paykan) |
| 24 | MF | IRN | Mehrdad Kafshgari (from Gahar Zagros) |
| 28 | FW | IRN | Alireza Abbasfard (from Paykan) |
| 22 | GK | IRN | Aria Hassanzadeh (from Mes Kerman) |
| 15 | FW | BRA | Anderson Gomes (from (Brazil) Grêmio Barueri) |
| 2 | MF | IRN | Omid Alishah (from Naft Tehran) |

Out: Note: Flags indicate national team as defined under FIFA eligibility rules; some limited exceptions apply. Players may hold more than one non-FIFA nationality.

| No. | Pos. | Nation | Player |
|---|---|---|---|
| 31 | MF | IRN | Mohammad Saleh Khalil Azad (to Fajr Sepasi) |
| 77 | MF | LTU | Mantas Savėnas (to (Russia) Gazovik Orenburg) |
| 16 | MF | IRN | Mohsen Zahedi (to Mes Sarcheshmeh) |
| 20 | DF | IRN | Abouzar Rahimi (to Damash Gilan) |
| 9 | MF | IRN | Kamal Kamyabinia (to Shahrdari Tabriz) |
| 27 | FW | IRN | Amin Motevaselzadeh (to Foolad) |
| 17 | FW | SYR | Mahmoud Al Amenah (Released) |
| 13 | MF | IRN | Hossein Koushki (to Bargh Shiraz) |

=== Saba Qom ===
In: Note: Flags indicate national team as defined under FIFA eligibility rules; some limited exceptions apply. Players may hold more than one non-FIFA nationality.

| No. | Pos. | Nation | Player |
|---|---|---|---|
| 1 | GK | IRN | Ahmad Khormali (from Aluminium Hormozgan) |
| 7 | MF | IRN | Mahmoud Tighnavard (from Aluminium Hormozgan) |
| 12 | DF | IRN | Rasoul Boroush (from Shahrdari Yasuj) |
| 14 | FW | IRN | Hossein Hejazipour (from Shahrdari Yasuj) |
| 17 | MF | IRN | Majid Houtan (from Nassaji Mazandaran) |
| 18 | MF | IRN | Karim Eslami (from Etka Gorgan) |
| 25 | MF | IRN | Milad Soleiman Fallah (from Saipa Mehr Karaj) |
| 6 | MF | IRN | Mehdi Badrlou (from Aluminium Hormozgan) |
| 10 | FW | IRN | Reza Enayati (from Sepahan) |
| 5 | DF | IRN | Akbar Sadeghi (from Sanati Kaveh) |
| 9 | MF | IRN | Milad Nouri (from Esteghlal Ahvaz) |
| 30 | FW | IRN | Yaser Karami (from Saba Qom Academy) |
| 32 | | IRN | Mohammad Arab Khorasani (from Saba Qom Academy) |
| 35 | | IRN | Mohsen Karami (from Saba Qom Academy) |
| 40 | GK | IRN | Mohammad Reza Vafaei (from Saba Qom Academy) |
| 34 | | IRN | Mojtaba Mobini Pour (from Saba Qom Academy) |

Out: Note: Flags indicate national team as defined under FIFA eligibility rules; some limited exceptions apply. Players may hold more than one non-FIFA nationality.

| No. | Pos. | Nation | Player |
|---|---|---|---|
| 1 | GK | IRN | Mehdi Vaezi (to Steel Azin) |
| 5 | DF | IRN | Saeed Khani (to Aboomoslem) |
| 6 | DF | IRN | Abolfazl Hajizadeh (to Shahrdari Tabriz) |
| 10 | MF | IRN | Davoud Haghi (to Zob Ahan) |
| 12 | MF | IRN | Ahmad Taghavi (to Aluminium Hormozgan) |
| 15 | MF | BRA | Wando da Costa Silva (to (Brazil) Vila Nova) |
| 17 | MF | IRN | Vahid Nemati (to Fajr Sepasi) |
| 20 | MF | IRN | Alireza Mirshafian (to Pas Hamedan) |
| 25 | MF | BRA | Paulo Almeida (to (Brazil) Rio Branco) |
| 9 | FW | IRN | Hadi Asghari (released) |
| 11 | FW | IRN | Mohsen Bayatinia (to Mes Kerman) |
| 14 | FW | IRN | Farzad Hatami (to Sepahan, Loan Return) |
| 7 | MF | IRN | Alireza Nikbakht (to Paykan) |

=== Saipa ===
In: Note: Flags indicate national team as defined under FIFA eligibility rules; some limited exceptions apply. Players may hold more than one non-FIFA nationality.

| No. | Pos. | Nation | Player |
|---|---|---|---|
| 20 | DF | IRN | Pirouz Ghorbani (from Mes Kerman) |
| 7 | MF | IRN | Mohammad Mansouri (from Mes Kerman) |
| 40 | MF | IRN | Eshagh Sobhani (from Mes Sarcheshmeh) |
| 4 | MF | IRN | Roozbeh Shahalidoost (from Pas Hamedan) |
| 30 | GK | IRN | Hossein Ashena (from Naft Tehran) |
| 33 | MF | IRN | Omid Ravankhah (from Esteghlal) |
| 1 | GK | IRN | Sajjad Biranvand (from Iranjavan) |
| 32 | FW | IRN | Farid Mousavi (from Youth system) |

Out: Note: Flags indicate national team as defined under FIFA eligibility rules; some limited exceptions apply. Players may hold more than one non-FIFA nationality.

| No. | Pos. | Nation | Player |
|---|---|---|---|
| 12 | GK | IRN | Habib Dehghani (to Sanat Naft) |
| 2 | MF | IRN | Saeed Ghezelagchi (to Fajr Sepasi) |
| 4 | DF | IRN | Mostafa Sabri (to Sanat Naft) |
| 13 | MF | IRN | Ali Haghdoost (to Abumoslem) |
| 1 | GK | IRN | Vahid Sheikhveisi (to Fajr Sepasi) |
| 17 | DF | IRN | Hossein Hosseini (to Mes Sarcheshmeh) |
| 7 | MF | IRN | Saeed Yousefzadeh (from Saipa) |

=== Sanat Naft ===
In: Note: Flags indicate national team as defined under FIFA eligibility rules; some limited exceptions apply. Players may hold more than one non-FIFA nationality.

| No. | Pos. | Nation | Player |
|---|---|---|---|
| 4 | MF | IRN | Siamak Koohnavard (from Naft Tehran) |
| 1 | GK | IRN | Habib Dehghani (from Saipa) |
| 20 | DF | ARM | Valeri Aleksanyan (from (Armenia) Ulisses) |
| 13 | MF | IRN | Hadi Ramezani (from PAS Hamedan) |
| 11 | FW | MLI | Founéké Sy (from Iranjavan) |
| 5 | DF | IRN | Mostafa Sabri (from Saipa) |
| 12 | MF | IRN | Hossein Salami (from Mes Rafsanjan) |
| 3 | DF | IRN | Meysam Amiri (from Iranjavan) |
| 33 | GK | IRN | Habib Mangashti (from Foolad Novin) |

Out: Note: Flags indicate national team as defined under FIFA eligibility rules; some limited exceptions apply. Players may hold more than one non-FIFA nationality.

| No. | Pos. | Nation | Player |
|---|---|---|---|
| 30 | MF | BRA | Nei Paraíba (released) |
| 20 | MF | IRN | Mohammadreza Zolfonoun (released) |
| 21 | FW | IRN | Mohammad Azizi (released) |
| 11 | FW | MLI | Issa Traoré (released) |
| 3 | DF | IRN | Shaban Asadi (released) |
| 12 | MF | IRN | Vahid Paloch (released, to Machine Sazi) |
| 4 | DF | IRN | Farhad AleKhamis (released) |
| 13 | DF | IRN | Milad Rakhshan (released) |
| 24 | MF | IRN | Ziaeddin Niknafs (released) |
| 1 | GK | IRN | Hassan Houri (released, to Mes Sarcheshmeh) |
| — | MF | IRN | Mohsen Delvari (to Tractor Sazi) |

=== Sepahan ===
In: Note: Flags indicate national team as defined under FIFA eligibility rules; some limited exceptions apply. Players may hold more than one non-FIFA nationality.

| No. | Pos. | Nation | Player |
|---|---|---|---|
| 7 | FW | IRQ | Emad Mohammed (from Shahin) |
| 33 | DF | IRN | Hadi Tamini (from Malavan) |
| 23 | FW | IRN | Mehdi Seyed-Salehi (from Esteghlal) |
| 17 | DF | IRN | Abolhassan Jafari (from Malavan) |
| 14 | FW | IRN | Farzad Hatami (from Saba Qom, Loan Return) |
| 2 | DF | IRN | Hassan Ashjari (from Steel Azin) |
| 1 | GK | IRN | Rahman Ahmadi (from Persepolis) |
| 22 | GK | IRN | Reza Mohamadi (from Iranjavan) |

Out: Note: Flags indicate national team as defined under FIFA eligibility rules; some limited exceptions apply. Players may hold more than one non-FIFA nationality.

| No. | Pos. | Nation | Player |
|---|---|---|---|
| 21 | FW | IRN | Reza Enayati (to Saba Qom) |
| 10 | FW | SEN | Ibrahima Touré (to (United Arab Emirates) Ajman Club) |
| 28 | MF | IRN | Ehsan Hajysafi (to Tractor Sazi) |
| 5 | DF | IRN | Hadi Aghili (to (Qatar) Al-Arabi) |
| 1 | GK | IRN | Mehdi Rahmati (to Esteghlal) |
| 12 | GK | IRN | Mohammad Savari (Released) |
| 2 | MF | IRN | Khosro Heydari (to Esteghlal) |
| 23 | FW | IRN | Javad Kazemian (to Persepolis) |

=== Shahin Bushehr ===
In: Note: Flags indicate national team as defined under FIFA eligibility rules; some limited exceptions apply. Players may hold more than one non-FIFA nationality.

| No. | Pos. | Nation | Player |
|---|---|---|---|
| 30 | GK | IRN | Vahid Taleblou (from Esteghlal) |
| 3 | DF | IRN | Hadi Shakouri (from Esteghlal) |
| 4 | DF | IRN | Mehdi Shokouhi (from Hamyari Arak) |
| 8 | DF | IRN | Ali Ansarian (from Shahrdari Tabriz) |
| 10 | MF | IRN | Meysam Maniei (from Tractor Sazi) |
| 31 | MF | IRN | Saeed Bayat (from Gostaresh Foolad) |
| 33 | MF | IRN | Morteza Aziz-Mohammadi (from Pas Hamedan) |

Out: Note: Flags indicate national team as defined under FIFA eligibility rules; some limited exceptions apply. Players may hold more than one non-FIFA nationality.

| No. | Pos. | Nation | Player |
|---|---|---|---|
| 10 | MF | IRN | Abdullah Karami (to Foolad) |
| 9 | FW | IRQ | Emad Mohammed (to Sepahan) |
| 4 | DF | IRN | Ahmad Alenemeh (to Tractor Sazi) |
| 7 | MF | IRN | Sattar Zare (to Fajr Sepasi) |
| 5 | DF | IRN | Reza Baziari (Retired) |
| 1 | GK | IRN | Mojtaba Roshangar (to Aluminium Hormozgan) |
| 23 | MF | IRN | Ali Salmani (Released) |

=== Shahrdari Tabriz ===
In: Note: Flags indicate national team as defined under FIFA eligibility rules; some limited exceptions apply. Players may hold more than one non-FIFA nationality.

| No. | Pos. | Nation | Player |
|---|---|---|---|
| 1 | GK | IRN | Ebrahim Mirzapour (from Paykan) |
| 6 | DF | IRN | Abolfazl Hajizadeh (from Saba) |
| 5 | DF | IRN | Nabiollah Bagheriha (from Mes Kerman) |
| 9 | MF | IRN | Mehdi Mohammadzadeh (from Naft Tehran) |
| 17 | FW | IRN | Jafar Bazri (from Foolad Yazd) |
| 20 | MF | IRN | Kamal Kamyabinia (from Rah Ahan) |
| 28 | | IRN | Issa Parto (from Damash Karaj) |
| 27 | DF | IRN | Mehrdad Ghanbari (from Sanat Sari) |
| 24 | MF | SRB | Saša Krajinović (from (Serbia) FK Čukarički Stankom) |
| 2 | DF | SRB | Dragan Žarković (from (Serbia) BSK Borča) |
| 25 | MF | SRB | Bojan Beljić (from (Serbia) FK Jagodina) |

Out: Note: Flags indicate national team as defined under FIFA eligibility rules; some limited exceptions apply. Players may hold more than one non-FIFA nationality.

| No. | Pos. | Nation | Player |
|---|---|---|---|
| 15 | DF | BRA | Paulo Cesar (released) |
| 6 | MF | IRN | Rasoul Alizadeh (to Machine Sazi) |
| 28 | DF | IRN | Ali Ansarian (to Shahin Bushehr) |
| 9 | MF | IRN | Mohammad Reza Tahmasebi (Released) |
| 5 | MF | IRN | Ibrahim Abarghouei (Released) |
| 27 | MF | IRN | Mohammad Sahimi (Released) |
| 30 | DF | IRN | Rouhollah Bahrami (Released) |
| 24 | MF | BRA | Carlos Eduardo Soares (Released) |
| — | FW | BRA | Marcio Rodrigo Trombetta (Released) |

=== Tractor Sazi ===
In: Note: Flags indicate national team as defined under FIFA eligibility rules; some limited exceptions apply. Players may hold more than one non-FIFA nationality.

| No. | Pos. | Nation | Player |
|---|---|---|---|
| 10 | FW | IRN | Siavash Akbarpour (from Steel Azin) |
| — | MF | IRN | Ali Molaei (from Gostaresh Foolad, Loan Return) |
| 28 | MF | IRN | Ehsan Hajysafi (from Sepahan) |
| 15 | DF | IRN | Fardin Abedini (from Esteghlal) |
| 4 | DF | IRN | Ahmad Alenemeh (from Shahin) |
| 20 | MF | BRA | Rodrigo Tosi (from (Switzerland) Lausanne-Sport) |
| 5 | FW | GER | Shpejtim Arifi (from Persepolis) |
| 2 | DF | IRN | Amir Hossein Sadeghi (from Esteghlal) |
| 7 | MF | IRN | Farzad Ashoubi (from Esteghlal) |
| 33 | GK | IRN | Mohsen Forouzanfar (from Gostaresh Foolad) |
| 18 | MF | IRN | Mohsen Delvari (from Sanat Naft) |
| 17 | FW | POR | Flávio Paixão (from (Scotland) Hamilton Academical) |

Out: Note: Flags indicate national team as defined under FIFA eligibility rules; some limited exceptions apply. Players may hold more than one non-FIFA nationality.

| No. | Pos. | Nation | Player |
|---|---|---|---|
| 40 | FW | IRN | Mohammad Ahmadpouri (to Zob Ahan) |
| 10 | FW | IRN | Rasoul Khatibi (to Gostaresh Foolad), Loan Return |
| 13 | MF | IRQ | Karrar Jassim (to Esteghlal) |
| 11 | FW | BRA | Leonardo Pimenta (Released, to (Brazil) Duque de Caxias) |
| 3 | DF | IRN | Mojtaba Torshizi (to Mes Sarcheshmeh) |
| 20 | DF | IRN | Mohammad Nosrati (to Perspolis) |
| 14 | MF | IRN | Andranik Teymourian (to Esteghlal) |
| 23 | MF | IRN | Meysam Maniei (to Shahin Bushehr) |
| — | FW | IRN | Ali Molaei (to Mes Sarcheshmeh) |
| 7 | MF | IRN | Alireza Jalili (to Pas Hamedan) |

=== Zob Ahan ===
In: Note: Flags indicate national team as defined under FIFA eligibility rules; some limited exceptions apply. Players may hold more than one non-FIFA nationality.

| No. | Pos. | Nation | Player |
|---|---|---|---|
| 40 | FW | IRN | Mohammad Ahmadpouri (from Shahin Bushehr) |
| 6 | MF | IRN | Davoud Haghi (from Saba Qom) |
| 3 | MF | BRA | Felipe Alves de Souza (from Esteghlal) |
| 16 | MF | POR | Hugo Machado (from (Portugal) Naval) |
| 9 | MF | IRQ | Hawar Mulla Mohammed (from Esteghlal) |

Out: Note: Flags indicate national team as defined under FIFA eligibility rules; some limited exceptions apply. Players may hold more than one non-FIFA nationality.

| No. | Pos. | Nation | Player |
|---|---|---|---|
| 9 | MF | IRN | Mohammad Reza Khalatbari (to (Qatar) Al Gharafa) |
| 30 | MF | IRN | Mehdi Rajabzadeh (to Fajr Sepasi) |
| 14 | MF | IRN | Jalal Rafkhaei (to Malavan) |
| 6 | MF | IRN | Majid Noormohammadi (to Aluminium Hormozgan) |

== Azadegan League ==
=== Aboomoslem ===
In: Note: Flags indicate national team as defined under FIFA eligibility rules; some limited exceptions apply. Players may hold more than one non-FIFA nationality.

| No. | Pos. | Nation | Player |
|---|---|---|---|
| — | | IRN | Rasoul Ghaffari (from Foolad Yazd F.C.) |
| — | | IRN | Hamid Falah (from Naft Tehran F.C.) |
| — | DF | IRN | Saeed Khani (from Saba Qom) |
| — | MF | IRN | Farzad Hamidi (from Petrochimi Tabriz F.C.) |
| — | | IRN | Hamid Soleiman (from ?) |
| — | | IRN | Nader Jalali (from ?) |
| — | | IRN | Jafar Afhami (from ?) |
| — | | IRN | Mohammadali Soleiman Falah (from ?) |
| — | MF | CMR | Jean Ngody (from Shirin Faraz) |
| — | MF | IRN | Ali Haghdoost (from Saipa) |
| — | DF | IRN | Mehdi Tajik (from Paykan) |
| — | MF | IRN | Ali Salmani (from Paykan) |
| — | MF | IRN | Salman Zahmatkesh (from Payam) |
| — | FW | NGA | Erfan Olerum (from Gostaresh) |

Out: Note: Flags indicate national team as defined under FIFA eligibility rules; some limited exceptions apply. Players may hold more than one non-FIFA nationality.

| No. | Pos. | Nation | Player |
|---|---|---|---|
| — | DF | IRN | Vahid Asgari (to Aluminium Hormozgan) |
| — | MF | IRN | Saeid Chahjouei (to Rah Ahan) |
| — | FW | IRN | Arash Roshanipour (to Shahrdari Arak) |
| — | FW | IRN | Mohammad Gholamin (to Gahar Zagros) |

=== Aluminium Hormozgan ===
In: Note: Flags indicate national team as defined under FIFA eligibility rules; some limited exceptions apply. Players may hold more than one non-FIFA nationality.

| No. | Pos. | Nation | Player |
|---|---|---|---|
| — | MF | IRN | Mohammad Aramtab (from Nassaji Mazandaran) |
| — | DF | IRN | Vahid Asgari (from Aboomoslem) |
| — | MF | IRN | Ahmad Taghavi (from Saba Qom) |
| — | GK | IRN | Mojtaba Roshangar (from Shahin Bushehr) |
| — | MF | IRN | Majid Noormohammadi (from Zob Ahan) |
| — | FW | IRN | Bahman Tahmasbi (from Naft Tehran) |

Out: Note: Flags indicate national team as defined under FIFA eligibility rules; some limited exceptions apply. Players may hold more than one non-FIFA nationality.

| No. | Pos. | Nation | Player |
|---|---|---|---|
| — | DF | IRN | Oveis Kordjahan (to Mes Sarcheshmeh) |
| 1 | GK | IRN | Ahmad Khormali (to Saba Qom) |
| 7 | MF | IRN | Mahmoud Tighnavard (to Saba Qom) |
| — | DF | IRN | Abbas Kazemian (to Fajr Sepasi) |
| — | MF | IRN | Mehdi Badrlou (to Saba Qom) |
| — | DF | IRN | Hamid Azizadeh (to Esteghlal) |
| — | MF | IRN | Davoud Seyed Abbasi (to Paykan) |

=== Bargh Shiraz ===
In: Note: Flags indicate national team as defined under FIFA eligibility rules; some limited exceptions apply. Players may hold more than one non-FIFA nationality.

| No. | Pos. | Nation | Player |
|---|---|---|---|
| — | MF | IRN | Hossein Koushki (from Rah Ahan) |
| — | MF | MLI | Issa Traoré (from Free agent) |

Out: Note: Flags indicate national team as defined under FIFA eligibility rules; some limited exceptions apply. Players may hold more than one non-FIFA nationality.

| No. | Pos. | Nation | Player |
|---|---|---|---|
| 10 | MF | IRN | Mohammad Pourmand (to Sanat Naft) |
| 11 | MF | IRN | Mohammad Afand (to Sanat Naft) |
| 1 | GK | URU | Martín Barlocco (to Gostaresh Fooald) |

=== Damash Tehran ===
In: Note: Flags indicate national team as defined under FIFA eligibility rules; some limited exceptions apply. Players may hold more than one non-FIFA nationality.

| No. | Pos. | Nation | Player |
|---|---|---|---|
| — | MF | IRN | Mehdi Hosseini (from Nassaji Mazandaran) |
| — | MF | IRN | Mohsen Pourhaji (from Nassaji Mazandaran) |
| — | MF | IRN | Amin Torkashvand (from Damash Gilan) |

Out: Note: Flags indicate national team as defined under FIFA eligibility rules; some limited exceptions apply. Players may hold more than one non-FIFA nationality.

| No. | Pos. | Nation | Player |
|---|---|---|---|
| — | | IRN | Issa Parto (to Shahrdari Tabriz) |

=== Esteghlal Jonub ===
In: Note: Flags indicate national team as defined under FIFA eligibility rules; some limited exceptions apply. Players may hold more than one non-FIFA nationality.

| No. | Pos. | Nation | Player |

Out: Note: Flags indicate national team as defined under FIFA eligibility rules; some limited exceptions apply. Players may hold more than one non-FIFA nationality.

| No. | Pos. | Nation | Player |

=== Etka ===
In: Note: Flags indicate national team as defined under FIFA eligibility rules; some limited exceptions apply. Players may hold more than one non-FIFA nationality.

| No. | Pos. | Nation | Player |

Out: Note: Flags indicate national team as defined under FIFA eligibility rules; some limited exceptions apply. Players may hold more than one non-FIFA nationality.

| No. | Pos. | Nation | Player |
|---|---|---|---|
| — | MF | IRN | Mohammad Gorji (to Saipa Shomal) |
| — | MF | IRN | Ghasem Akbari (to Tarbiat Yazd) |
| 18 | MF | IRN | Karim Eslami (from Saba Qom) |

=== Foolad Yazd ===
In: Note: Flags indicate national team as defined under FIFA eligibility rules; some limited exceptions apply. Players may hold more than one non-FIFA nationality.

| No. | Pos. | Nation | Player |
|---|---|---|---|
| — | FW | IRN | Mostafa Mahdavikia (from Sanati Kaveh) |
| — | MF | IRN | Akbar Sadeghi (from Saba Qom) |

Out: Note: Flags indicate national team as defined under FIFA eligibility rules; some limited exceptions apply. Players may hold more than one non-FIFA nationality.

| No. | Pos. | Nation | Player |
|---|---|---|---|
| — | FW | IRN | Jafar Bazri (to Shahrdari Tabriz) |
| — | | IRN | Rasoul Ghaffari (to F.C. Aboomoslem) |

=== Gahar Zagros ===
In: Note: Flags indicate national team as defined under FIFA eligibility rules; some limited exceptions apply. Players may hold more than one non-FIFA nationality.

| No. | Pos. | Nation | Player |

Out: Note: Flags indicate national team as defined under FIFA eligibility rules; some limited exceptions apply. Players may hold more than one non-FIFA nationality.

| No. | Pos. | Nation | Player |
|---|---|---|---|
| 33 | MF | BIH | Boris Bačak (to (Bosnia and Herzegovina) NK Široki) |
| 15 | MF | MKD | Vlatko Grozdanoski (to (North Macedonia) FK Rabotnički) |
| 8 | MF | IRN | Mehrdad Kafshgari (to Rah Ahan) |
| — | DF | IRN | Milad Nosrati (to Damash Gilan) |
| — | MF | IRN | Afshin Esmaeilizadeh (to Damash Gilan) |

=== Gol Gohar ===
In: Note: Flags indicate national team as defined under FIFA eligibility rules; some limited exceptions apply. Players may hold more than one non-FIFA nationality.

| No. | Pos. | Nation | Player |
|---|---|---|---|
| — | FW | CRO | Igor Lozo |

Out: Note: Flags indicate national team as defined under FIFA eligibility rules; some limited exceptions apply. Players may hold more than one non-FIFA nationality.

| No. | Pos. | Nation | Player |
|---|---|---|---|
| — | GK | IRN | Mohammad Khazaei (to Mes Sarcheshmeh) |
| — | MF | IRN | Moslem Firoozabadi (to Mes Sarcheshmeh) |

=== Gostaresh Foolad ===
In: Note: Flags indicate national team as defined under FIFA eligibility rules; some limited exceptions apply. Players may hold more than one non-FIFA nationality.

| No. | Pos. | Nation | Player |
|---|---|---|---|
| — | FW | IRN | Rasoul Khatibi (loan return from Tractor Sazi) |
| — | GK | URU | Martín Barlocco (from Bargh Shiraz) |

Out: Note: Flags indicate national team as defined under FIFA eligibility rules; some limited exceptions apply. Players may hold more than one non-FIFA nationality.

| No. | Pos. | Nation | Player |
|---|---|---|---|
| — | DF | IRN | Meysam Hosseini (to Esteghlal) |
| — | MF | IRN | Abbas Aghaei (to Damash gilan) |
| — | MF | IRN | Mohsen Mirabi (to Rah Ahan, Loan Return) |
| — | MF | IRN | Ali Molaei (to Tractor Sazi, Loan Return) |
| — | FW | IRN | Rasoul Khatibi (to Machine Sazi) |
| 40 | FW | NGA | Daniel Olerum (Aboomoslem) |
| — | GK | IRN | Hamed Riahi (to Machine Sazi) |
| — | MF | IRN | Saeed Bayat (to Shahin Bushehr) |
| — | GK | IRN | Mohsen Forouzanfar (to Tractor Sazi) |
| — | FW | IRN | Ahamd Taeidi (to Pas Hamedan) |

=== Hamyari Arak ===
In: Note: Flags indicate national team as defined under FIFA eligibility rules; some limited exceptions apply. Players may hold more than one non-FIFA nationality.

| No. | Pos. | Nation | Player |

Out: Note: Flags indicate national team as defined under FIFA eligibility rules; some limited exceptions apply. Players may hold more than one non-FIFA nationality.

| No. | Pos. | Nation | Player |
|---|---|---|---|
| — | DF | IRN | Mehdi Shokouhi (to Shahin Bushehr) |
| — | DF | IRN | Abbas Yahya Beigi (to Foolad) |

=== Iranjavan ===
In: Note: Flags indicate national team as defined under FIFA eligibility rules; some limited exceptions apply. Players may hold more than one non-FIFA nationality.

| No. | Pos. | Nation | Player |

Out: Note: Flags indicate national team as defined under FIFA eligibility rules; some limited exceptions apply. Players may hold more than one non-FIFA nationality.

| No. | Pos. | Nation | Player |
|---|---|---|---|
| — | FW | MLI | Founéké Sy (to Sanat Naft) |
| — | MF | IRN | Mostafa Najmizadeh (to Mes Sarcheshmeh) |
| — | GK | IRN | Reza Mohammadi (to Sepahan) |
| — | GK | IRN | Sajjad Biranvand (to Saipa) |
| — | DF | IRN | Meysam Amiri (to Sanat Naft) |

=== Machine Sazi ===
In: Note: Flags indicate national team as defined under FIFA eligibility rules; some limited exceptions apply. Players may hold more than one non-FIFA nationality.

| No. | Pos. | Nation | Player |
|---|---|---|---|
| — | DF | BRA | Leonardo Gomes da Silva (From Unknown) |
| 1 | GK | BRA | Felipe Gomes (From (Brazil) Nacional) |
| — | | IRN | Kaveh Zangian (from Mes Rafsanjan) |
| — | FW | IRN | Rasoul Khatibi (from Gostaresh Foolad) |
| — | GK | IRN | Hamed Riahi (from Gostaresh Foolad) |
| — | MF | IRN | Shahriar Shirvand (from Foolad Natanz) |
| — | MF | IRN | Vahid Paloch (from Sanat Naft) |
| — | MF | IRN | Rasoul Alizadeh (from Shahrdari Tabriz) |
| — | FW | IRN | Saeed Hallafi (from Persepolis) |
| — | GK | IRN | Nader Ghobeishavi (from Shahrdari Bandar Abbas) |
| — | FW | IRN | Faraz Fatemi (from Mes Kerman) |

Out: Note: Flags indicate national team as defined under FIFA eligibility rules; some limited exceptions apply. Players may hold more than one non-FIFA nationality.

| No. | Pos. | Nation | Player |
|---|---|---|---|
| 18 | MF | IRN | Ahmad Paasi (to Pas Hamedan) |
| 27 | GK | IRN | Hadi Zarrin Saed (to Esteghlal) |

=== Mes Rafsanjan ===
In: Note: Flags indicate national team as defined under FIFA eligibility rules; some limited exceptions apply. Players may hold more than one non-FIFA nationality.

| No. | Pos. | Nation | Player |
|---|---|---|---|
| — | | IRN | Mohammad Gharib (from Sanat Sari) |

Out: Note: Flags indicate national team as defined under FIFA eligibility rules; some limited exceptions apply. Players may hold more than one non-FIFA nationality.

| No. | Pos. | Nation | Player |
|---|---|---|---|
| — | FW | COL | Carlos Salazar (to Mes Kerman) |
| — | | IRN | Kaveh Zangian (to Machine Sazi Tabriz) |
| — | MF | IRN | Hossein Salami (to Sanat Naft) |

=== Naft Masjed Soleyman ===
In: Note: Flags indicate national team as defined under FIFA eligibility rules; some limited exceptions apply. Players may hold more than one non-FIFA nationality.

| No. | Pos. | Nation | Player |

Out: Note: Flags indicate national team as defined under FIFA eligibility rules; some limited exceptions apply. Players may hold more than one non-FIFA nationality.

| No. | Pos. | Nation | Player |
|---|---|---|---|
| — | FW | IRN | Farzad Mohammadi (to Damash Gilan) |

=== Nassaji ===
In: Note: Flags indicate national team as defined under FIFA eligibility rules; some limited exceptions apply. Players may hold more than one non-FIFA nationality.

| No. | Pos. | Nation | Player |
|---|---|---|---|
| — | MF | IRN | Hadi Sohrabi (from Free agent) |
| — | FW | IRN | Fereydoon Fazli (from Esteghlal Ahvaz) |

Out: Note: Flags indicate national team as defined under FIFA eligibility rules; some limited exceptions apply. Players may hold more than one non-FIFA nationality.

| No. | Pos. | Nation | Player |
|---|---|---|---|
| 3 | MF | BIH | Delimir Bajić (to (Cyprus) Olympiakos Nicosia) |
| 5 | MF | IRN | Akbar Bakhtiari (to Steel Azin) |
| — | MF | IRN | Mehdi Hosseini (to Damash Tehran) |
| — | MF | IRN | Mohammad Aramtab (from Aluminium Hormozgan) |
| — | MF | IRN | Mohsen Pourhaji (to Damash Tehran) |
| — | MF | IRN | Touraj Rajaei (to Tarbiat Yazd) |
| — | MF | IRN | Ali Haddad (from Tarbiat Yazd) |
| 1 | GK | BRA | Daniel Flumignan (to (Brazil) ASA) |
| — | MF | CMR | David Wirikom (to Shirin Faraz, loan return) |
| 17 | MF | IRN | Majid Houtan (to Saba Qom) |
| — | MF | IRN | Babak Razi (to Pas Hamedan) |

=== Nirooye Zamini ===
In: Note: Flags indicate national team as defined under FIFA eligibility rules; some limited exceptions apply. Players may hold more than one non-FIFA nationality.

| No. | Pos. | Nation | Player |

Out: Note: Flags indicate national team as defined under FIFA eligibility rules; some limited exceptions apply. Players may hold more than one non-FIFA nationality.

| No. | Pos. | Nation | Player |

=== Pas Hamadan ===
In: Note: Flags indicate national team as defined under FIFA eligibility rules; some limited exceptions apply. Players may hold more than one non-FIFA nationality.

| No. | Pos. | Nation | Player |
|---|---|---|---|
| — | MF | IRN | Meysam Rezapour (from Paykan) |
| — | FW | IRN | Ahmad Paasi (from Machine Sazi) |
| — | DF | BRA | Máximo (from Esteghlal Ahvaz) |
| — | GK | IRN | Ali Nazarmohammadi (to Damash Gilan) |
| — | MF | IRN | Alireza Mirshafian (from Saba Qom) |
| — | MF | IRN | Ali Ghorbani (from Paykan) |
| — | MF | IRN | Babak Razi (from Nassaji) |
| — | MF | IRN | Alireza Jalili (from Tractor Sazi) |
| — | MF | IRN | Mohammad Javad Zarei (from Shahrdari Yasuj) |
| — | MF | BRA | Tiago Alves Fraga (from Persepolis) |
| — | DF | IRN | Masoud Mikaeili (from Damash Gilan) |
| — | FW | IRN | Ahmad Taeidi (from Gostaresh) |

Out: Note: Flags indicate national team as defined under FIFA eligibility rules; some limited exceptions apply. Players may hold more than one non-FIFA nationality.

| No. | Pos. | Nation | Player |
|---|---|---|---|
| 5 | DF | IRN | Majid Heydari (to Fajr Sepasi) |
| 29 | MF | ARM | Arthur Yedigaryan (to (Armenia) Banats Yerevan) |
| 6 | MF | IRN | Roozbeh Shahalidoost (to Saipa) |
| 11 | FW | IRN | Ali Samereh (to Mes Sarcheshmeh) |
| 10 | MF | IRN | Morteza Aziz-Mohammadi (to Shahin Bushehr) |
| 30 | GK | IRN | Mehdi Eslami (to Esteghlal) |
| 1 | GK | IRN | Saman Safa (to Foolad) |
| 15 | MF | IRN | Mehdi Agha Mohammadi (to Steel Azin) |
| 32 | DF | IRN | Mohammad Ebrahim Khosravi (to Malavan) |
| 18 | MF | IRN | Vahid Aliabadi (to Mes Sarcheshmeh) |

=== Payam Mashhad ===
In: Note: Flags indicate national team as defined under FIFA eligibility rules; some limited exceptions apply. Players may hold more than one non-FIFA nationality.

| No. | Pos. | Nation | Player |

Out: Note: Flags indicate national team as defined under FIFA eligibility rules; some limited exceptions apply. Players may hold more than one non-FIFA nationality.

| No. | Pos. | Nation | Player |

=== Payam Mokhaberat ===
In: Note: Flags indicate national team as defined under FIFA eligibility rules; some limited exceptions apply. Players may hold more than one non-FIFA nationality.

| No. | Pos. | Nation | Player |

Out: Note: Flags indicate national team as defined under FIFA eligibility rules; some limited exceptions apply. Players may hold more than one non-FIFA nationality.

| No. | Pos. | Nation | Player |

=== Paykan ===
In: Note: Flags indicate national team as defined under FIFA eligibility rules; some limited exceptions apply. Players may hold more than one non-FIFA nationality.

| No. | Pos. | Nation | Player |
|---|---|---|---|
| — | MF | IRN | Alireza Nikbakht (from Saba Qom) |
| — | MF | IRN | Mohammad Parvin (from Persepolis) |

Out: Note: Flags indicate national team as defined under FIFA eligibility rules; some limited exceptions apply. Players may hold more than one non-FIFA nationality.

| No. | Pos. | Nation | Player |
|---|---|---|---|
| 34 | FW | SVK | Zoltán Harsányi (to (Slovakia) DAC Dunajska Streda, End of Loan) |
| 7 | MF | IRN | Meysam Rezapour (to Pas Hamedan) |
| 1 | GK | IRN | Ebrahim Mirzapour (to Shahrdari) |
| 11 | MF | IRN | Majid Khodabandelou (to Mes Kerman) |
| 10 | FW | IRN | Jahangir Asgari (to Damash Gilan) |
| 17 | MF | IRN | Ali Ghorbani (to Pas Hamedan) |
| 33 | GK | IRN | Milad Farahani (to Damash Gilan) |
| — | MF | IRN | Ali Gholam (to Rah Ahan) |
| 9 | FW | IRN | Alireza Abbasfard (to Rah Ahan) |
| 4 | DF | IRN | Mehdi Tajik (to Aboomoslem) |
| 8 | MF | IRN | Ali Salmani (to Aboomoslem) |

=== Saipa Shomal ===
In: Note: Flags indicate national team as defined under FIFA eligibility rules; some limited exceptions apply. Players may hold more than one non-FIFA nationality.

| No. | Pos. | Nation | Player |
|---|---|---|---|
| — | MF | IRN | Mohammad Gorji (from Etka Gorgan) |

Out: Note: Flags indicate national team as defined under FIFA eligibility rules; some limited exceptions apply. Players may hold more than one non-FIFA nationality.

| No. | Pos. | Nation | Player |

=== Sanati Kaveh ===
In: Note: Flags indicate national team as defined under FIFA eligibility rules; some limited exceptions apply. Players may hold more than one non-FIFA nationality.

| No. | Pos. | Nation | Player |

Out: Note: Flags indicate national team as defined under FIFA eligibility rules; some limited exceptions apply. Players may hold more than one non-FIFA nationality.

| No. | Pos. | Nation | Player |
|---|---|---|---|
| — | FW | IRN | Mostafa Mahdavikia (to Foolad Yazd) |
| — | MF | IRN | Akbar Sadeghi (to Saba Qom) |

=== Sanat Sari ===
In: Note: Flags indicate national team as defined under FIFA eligibility rules; some limited exceptions apply. Players may hold more than one non-FIFA nationality.

| No. | Pos. | Nation | Player |

Out: Note: Flags indicate national team as defined under FIFA eligibility rules; some limited exceptions apply. Players may hold more than one non-FIFA nationality.

| No. | Pos. | Nation | Player |
|---|---|---|---|
| — | DF | IRN | Esmaeil Bale |other= to Tarbiat Yazd |
| — | | IRN | Mohammad Gharib (to Mes Rafsanjan) |
| — | | IRN | Mehrzad Ghanbari (to Shahrdari Tabriz) |

=== Shahrdari Bandar Abbas ===
In: Note: Flags indicate national team as defined under FIFA eligibility rules; some limited exceptions apply. Players may hold more than one non-FIFA nationality.

| No. | Pos. | Nation | Player |

Out: Note: Flags indicate national team as defined under FIFA eligibility rules; some limited exceptions apply. Players may hold more than one non-FIFA nationality.

| No. | Pos. | Nation | Player |
|---|---|---|---|
| — | MF | IRN | Mostafa Mehdizadeh (to Steel Azin) |
| — | GK | IRN | Nader Ghobeishavi (to Mashin Sazi) |

=== Shahrdari Yasuj ===
In: Note: Flags indicate national team as defined under FIFA eligibility rules; some limited exceptions apply. Players may hold more than one non-FIFA nationality.

| No. | Pos. | Nation | Player |

Out: Note: Flags indicate national team as defined under FIFA eligibility rules; some limited exceptions apply. Players may hold more than one non-FIFA nationality.

| No. | Pos. | Nation | Player |
|---|---|---|---|
| 14 | FW | IRN | Hossein Hejazipour (to Saba Qom) |
| 12 | DF | IRN | Rasoul Boreshi (to Saba Qom) |
| — | MF | IRN | Mohammad Javad Zarei (to Pas Hamedan) |

=== Shirin Faraz ===
In: Note: Flags indicate national team as defined under FIFA eligibility rules; some limited exceptions apply. Players may hold more than one non-FIFA nationality.

| No. | Pos. | Nation | Player |
|---|---|---|---|
| — | MF | CMR | David Wirikom (from Nassaji Mazandaran, loan return) |

Out: Note: Flags indicate national team as defined under FIFA eligibility rules; some limited exceptions apply. Players may hold more than one non-FIFA nationality.

| No. | Pos. | Nation | Player |
|---|---|---|---|
| — | MF | CMR | Jean Ngody (to Aboomoslem) |

=== Steel Azin ===
In: Note: Flags indicate national team as defined under FIFA eligibility rules; some limited exceptions apply. Players may hold more than one non-FIFA nationality.

| No. | Pos. | Nation | Player |
|---|---|---|---|
| — | MF | IRN | Akbar Bakhtiari (from Nassaji Mazandaran) |
| — | MF | IRN | Mehdi Agha Mohammadi (from Pas Hamedan) |
| — | GK | IRN | Mehdi Vaezi (from Saba Qom) |
| — | MF | IRN | Mostafa Mehdizadeh (from Shahrdari Bandar Abbas) |

Out: Note: Flags indicate national team as defined under FIFA eligibility rules; some limited exceptions apply. Players may hold more than one non-FIFA nationality.

| No. | Pos. | Nation | Player |
|---|---|---|---|
| 16 | MF | IRN | Milad Zanidpour (to Damash Gilan) |
| 10 | FW | IRN | Siavash Akbarpour (to Tractor Sazi) |
| 23 | MF | IRN | Hadi Imani (to Fajr Sepasi) |
| 9 | FW | IRN | Mohammad Gholami (to Damash Gilan) |
| 12 | GK | IRN | Iman Sadeghi (to Malavan) |
| 2 | DF | IRN | Mehdi Mahdavikia (to Damash Gilan) |
| 3 | DF | IRN | Hassan Ashjari (to Sepahan) |
| 13 | DF | IRN | Hossein Kaabi (to Rah Ahan) |
| 33 | MF | IRN | Hossein Kazemi (to Rah Ahan) |
| 7 | MF | IRN | Ferydoon Zandi (to Esteghlal) |
| 40 | GK | IRN | Sosha Makani (to Naft Tehran) |
| 11 | MF | IRN | Mehrzad Madanchi (to (United Arab Emirates) Al-Shaab) |

=== Tarbiat Yazd ===
In: Note: Flags indicate national team as defined under FIFA eligibility rules; some limited exceptions apply. Players may hold more than one non-FIFA nationality.

| No. | Pos. | Nation | Player |
|---|---|---|---|
| — | MF | IRN | Touraj Rajaei (from Nassaji Mazandaran) |
| — | MF | IRN | Ali Haddad (from Nassaji Mazandaran) |
| — | DF | IRN | Esmaeil Bale (from Sanat Sari) |
| — | MF | IRN | Javad Rahimi (from Mes Kerman) |
| — | MF | IRN | Ghasem Akbari (from Etka Gorgan) |
| — | DF | BIH | Alen Bašić (from Malavan) |

Out: Note: Flags indicate national team as defined under FIFA eligibility rules; some limited exceptions apply. Players may hold more than one non-FIFA nationality.

| No. | Pos. | Nation | Player |
|---|---|---|---|
| — | | IRN | Hakim Hazbaeipour (to Moghavemat Sepasi) |
| — | DF | BIH | Edin Dudo (to (Bosnia and Herzegovina) NK Travnik) |
