= List of Iranian football transfers summer 2009 =

This is a list of Iranian football transfers for the 2009 summer transfer window. Only moves featuring at least one Iran Pro League or Azadegan League club are listed.

The summer transfer window opened on 23 May 2009 and closed at midnight on 27 July 2009. Players without a club may join one at any time, either during or in between transfer windows. Clubs can also sign players on loan at any point during the season. If need be, clubs may sign a goalkeeper on an emergency loan, if all others are unavailable.

As of this season each club is allowed to sign 6 Iranian players and 4 foreign players. In addition to this no team is permitted to sign a foreign goalkeeper.

== Iran Pro League ==
=== Aboomoslem ===
In: Note: Flags indicate national team as defined under FIFA eligibility rules; some limited exceptions apply. Players may hold more than one non-FIFA nationality.

No.	Pos.	Nation	Player
--	GK	IRI	Majid Gholami (from Payam Mashhad)
--	MF	IRI	Mohammad Sanati (from Payam Mashhad)
--	MF	IRI	Ruhollah Soltani (from Payam Mashhad)
--	MF	IRI	Alireza Jadidi (from Payam Mashhad)
--	FW	IRI	Mohammad Reza Rajabzadeh (from Payam Mashhad)
--	MF	IRI	Farshad Bahadorani (from Sepahan F.C.)
--	MF	IRI	Ebrahim Lovinian (from Sepahan F.C.)
--	MF	IRI	Pejman Jamshidi (to Foolad)
--	FW	BRA	Geraldo dos Santos Júnior (from Veria F.C.)

Out: Note: Flags indicate national team as defined under FIFA eligibility rules; some limited exceptions apply. Players may hold more than one non-FIFA nationality.

No.	Pos.	Nation	Player
--	FW	CMR	Jean Black Ngody (to Iranjavan F.C.)
1	GK	IRI	Shahab Gordan (to Zob Ahan)
8	MF	IRI	Maysam Baou (to Persepolis)
-	GK	IRI	Ahmad Khormali (to Aluminium Hormozgan)

=== Esteghlal Ahvaz ===
In: Note: Flags indicate national team as defined under FIFA eligibility rules; some limited exceptions apply. Players may hold more than one non-FIFA nationality.

No.	Pos.	Nation	Player
--	MF	IRI	Mohsen Arzani (from Payam Mashhad)
--	MF	IRI	Mohammad Matouri (from Payam Mashhad)
--	DF	TOG	Franck Atsou (from Persepolis)
--	DF	BRA	Diego Benedito Galvão Máximo (from Payam Mashhad)
--	MF	IRI	Esmaeil Sharifat (from Foolad)

Out: Note: Flags indicate national team as defined under FIFA eligibility rules; some limited exceptions apply. Players may hold more than one non-FIFA nationality.

No.	Pos.	Nation	Player
22	MF	IRI	Rasoul Zamani (from Foolad Novin F.C.)
18	FW	IRI	Ahmad Bozar (from Foolad Novin F.C.)
—	MF	IRQ	Mohammad Nasser Shakroun (to Shahin Bushehr F.C.)
26	MF	IRQ	Haitham Kadhim ( (Iraq) to Al-Quwa Al-Jawiya)
12	MF	IRI	Mehrzad Rezaei (to Damash Gilan)

=== Esteghlal ===
In: Note: Flags indicate national team as defined under FIFA eligibility rules; some limited exceptions apply. Players may hold more than one non-FIFA nationality.

No.	Pos.	Nation	Player
20	GK	IRI	Mohammad Mohammadi (from Paykan)
22	DF	IRI	Amir Hossein Sadeghi (from Mes)
17	MF	IRI	Mehrshad Momeni (from Pas Hamedan F.C.)
18	MF	IRI	Kianoush Rahmati (from Saipa)
--	MF	IRI	Mehran Noorafkan (from Bargh Shiraz)
11	FW	IRI	Reza Enayati ( (United Arab Emirates) from Al-Nasr SC)
12	FW	IRI	Mehdi Seyed Salehi (from Paykan)

Out: Note: Flags indicate national team as defined under FIFA eligibility rules; some limited exceptions apply. Players may hold more than one non-FIFA nationality.

No.	Pos.	Nation	Player
—	MF	IRI	Asghar Nadali (to Nassaji Mazandaran F.C.)
22	GK	IRI	Ashkan Namdari (to Aboomoslem)
--	GK	IRI	Mohammad Hossein Naeiji (to Persepolis)
13	DF	IRI	Ebrahim Taghipour (to Nassaji Mazandaran F.C.)
20	DF	IRI	Pirouz Ghorbani (to Mes Kerman F.C.)
11	MF	IRI	Meysam Manei (to Mes Kerman F.C.)
18	MF	IRI	Mehrdad Pooladi (to Tractor Sazi)
24	MF	IRI	Hossein Ghanbari (to Malavan)
25	MF	IRI	Saeid Bayat (to Pas Hamedan F.C.)
29	MF	IRI	Yadollah Akbari (to Pas Hamedan F.C.)
12	FW	IRI	Ahmad Khaziravi (to Bargh Shiraz)
19	FW	IRI	Ali Alizadeh (to Bargh Shiraz)
40	FW	IRI	Alireza Abbasfard (to Paykan F.C.)

=== Foolad ===
In: Note: Flags indicate national team as defined under FIFA eligibility rules; some limited exceptions apply. Players may hold more than one non-FIFA nationality.

No.	Pos.	Nation	Player
30	GK	IRI	Hossein Ashena (from Rah Ahan)
40	DF	IRI	Ali Hamoudi (from Mes Kerman)
13	MF	IRI	Javad Shirzad (from PAS Hamedan)
15	DF	IRI	Mohammad Alavi (from Persepolis)
2	DF	GEO	Jaba Mujiri (from FC Sioni Bolnisi)
19	MF	BIH	Mladen Bartolović (from Hajduk Split)
6	MF	IRQ	Abdul-Wahab Abu Al-Hail (from Sepahan)
--	FW	URU	Cristian Yeladian (from Juventud de Las Piedras)

Out: Note: Flags indicate national team as defined under FIFA eligibility rules; some limited exceptions apply. Players may hold more than one non-FIFA nationality.

No.	Pos.	Nation	Player
16	MF	IRI	Ali Obeidavi (to Foolad Novin F.C.)
18	FW	IRI	Mehdi Chajouei (to Foolad Novin F.C.)
32	GK	IRI	Amin Jahanmehr (to Foolad Novin F.C.)
21	DF	IRI	Amin Hejazi (to Foolad Novin F.C.)
3	DF	IRI	Ali Mardan Khalteh (to Foolad Novin F.C. )
23	DF	IRI	Reza Mardani (to Foolad Novin F.C. )
12	MF	IRI	Saeed Moradi (to Foolad Novin F.C.)
—	DF	IRI	Mohsen Rahimi (to Nassaji Mazandaran F.C.)
32	FW	IRI	Hojat Chaharmahali (to Sanat Naft Abadan F.C.)
--	FW	BRA	Sandro Gaúcho (to Sanat Naft Abadan F.C.)
27	MF	IRI	Mohammed Ghazi (to Zob Ahan)
11	MF	IRI	Esmaeil Sharifat (to Esteghlal Ahvaz)
14	MF	IRI	Ahmad Alenemeh (to Sepahan)
16	MF	IRI	Pejman Jamshidi (to Aboomoslem)
19	FW	BRA	Luciano Valente (to Shahin Bushehr)
33	GK	POR	Carlos Fernandes (to Rio Ave)
--	FW	IRI	Reza Taheri (to Damash Gilan)

=== Malavan ===
In: Note: Flags indicate national team as defined under FIFA eligibility rules; some limited exceptions apply. Players may hold more than one non-FIFA nationality.

No.	Pos.	Nation	Player
--	GK	IRI	Sajad Biranvand (from Bargh Shiraz)
--	MF	IRI	Majid Mir Marsali (from Tarbiat Yazd)
--	MF	IRI	Mehdi Monasef (from Malavan Sepid Anzali)
--	MF	IRI	Vahid Shekari (from Malavan Sepid Anzali)
--	MF	IRI	Pejman Nouri (from Persepolis F.C.)
--	MF	IRI	Hossein Ghanbari (from Esteghlal)
--	FW	IRI	Hossein Ebrahimi (from Damash Gilan)
--	FW	BRA	Adriano Alvez (from Free agent)
--	MF	IRI	Abolhassan Jafari (from Sepahan)

Out: Note: Flags indicate national team as defined under FIFA eligibility rules; some limited exceptions apply. Players may hold more than one non-FIFA nationality.

No.	Pos.	Nation	Player
--	MF	IRI	Mohammad Ali Amiri (Released)
--	DF	IRI	Ebrahim Sadeghi (Released)
--	MF	IRI	Mohammad Chamandoost (to Sepidrood Rasht F.C.)
--	FW	BIH	Tomislav Stanic (Released)
--	GK	IRI	Masoud Gholamalizad (Released) then to Paykan F.C.
--	MF	IRI	Saeed Yousefzadeh (Released)
--	MF	IRI	Mohsen Giahi (to Shahrdari Tabriz F.C.)
--	FW	IRI	Amir Khodamoradi (Released)
--	MF	IRI	Mehdi Chamanara (to Foolad F.C.)

=== Mes Kerman ===
In: Note: Flags indicate national team as defined under FIFA eligibility rules; some limited exceptions apply. Players may hold more than one non-FIFA nationality.

No.	Pos.	Nation	Player
6	DF	IRI	Pirouz Ghorbani (from Esteghlal F.C.)
40	FW	IRI	Ali Samereh (from Al-Shaab)
--	DF	BRA	Márcio Giovanini (from Campinense Clube)
13	DF	IRI	Masoud Zarei (from Persepolis)
--	GK	IRI	Saman Safa (from Pas Hamedan)
3	MF	IRI	Amir Hossein Yousefi (from Damash Gilan)
--	DF	IRQ	Mohammed Ali Karim (from Al-Jazira Club)
5	DF	IRI	Ghasem Dehnavi (from Mes Sarcheshme F.C.)
20	MF	IRI	Mehdi Rajabzadeh (from Al-Dhafra)

Out: Note: Flags indicate national team as defined under FIFA eligibility rules; some limited exceptions apply. Players may hold more than one non-FIFA nationality.

No.	Pos.	Nation	Player
—	MF	IRI	Majid Khodabandelo (to Paykan F.C.)
1	GK	IRI	Mehdi Rahmati (to Sepahan)
20	DF	IRI	Amir Hossein Sadeghi (to Esteghlal F.C.)
8	MF	IRI	Mehdi Kiani (to Shahin Bushehr)
5	DF	MLI	Sékou Fofana (to Mes Rafsanjan F.C.)

=== Moghavemat Sepasi ===
In: Note: Flags indicate national team as defined under FIFA eligibility rules; some limited exceptions apply. Players may hold more than one non-FIFA nationality.

No.	Pos.	Nation	Player
--	GK	IRI	Cyrus Sangchouli (from Payam Mashhad)
--	MF	IRI	Behnam Afsheh (from Damash Gilan)

Out: Note: Flags indicate national team as defined under FIFA eligibility rules; some limited exceptions apply. Players may hold more than one non-FIFA nationality.

No.	Pos.	Nation	Player
22	FW	IRI	Reza Khaleghifar (to Saipa)
17	FW	IRI	Yunes Geraeili (to Damash Gilan)
--	FW	IRI	Mohammad Pourmand (to Bargh Shiraz)

=== PAS Hamedan ===
In: Note: Flags indicate national team as defined under FIFA eligibility rules; some limited exceptions apply. Players may hold more than one non-FIFA nationality.

No.	Pos.	Nation	Player
--	MF	IRI	Yadollah Akbari (from Esteghlal)
--	MF	IRI	Armen Tahmasian Zaraneh (from FC Ararat)
--	DF	IRI	Majid Heidari (from Sanaye Arak F.C.)
--	MF	IRI	Pouria Seifpanahi (from Mehrkam Pars)
--	MF	IRI	Hadi Ramezani (from Moghavemat Sepasi)
--	MF	IRI	Morteza Aziz-Mohammadi (from Paykan F.C.)
--	DF	IRI	Hemat Abedinejad (from Bargh Shiraz)
--	MF	IRI	Saeed Bayat (from Esteghlal)
--	MF	IRI	Roozbeh Shahalidoost (from Saipa)
--	DF	SRB	Saša Kolunija (from FK Radnički Jugopetrol)
--	FW	IRI	Hadi Asghari (from Sepahan)

Out: Note: Flags indicate national team as defined under FIFA eligibility rules; some limited exceptions apply. Players may hold more than one non-FIFA nationality.

No.	Pos.	Nation	Player
29	MF	IRI	Emad Ghasemi (Nassaji Mazandaran F.C.)
13	DF	IRI	Javad Shirzad (to Foolad)
1	GK	IRI	Saman Safa (to Mes Kerman)
10	FW	IRI	Mostafa Chatrabgoon (to Moghavemat Sepasi)
5	DF	IRI	Hanif Omranzadeh (to Esteghlal)
18	DF	IRI	Abolfazl Hajizadeh (to Saba)
15	MF	NGR	Edison Joseph (to Shaanxi Neo-China Chanba)
19	MF	IRI	Asghar Talebnasab (released)
44	MF	IRI	Mohammad Reza Mamani (released)
2	MF	IRI	Mohsen Hamidi (released)
12	FW	IRI	Hamed Rasouli (released)
4	DF	IRI	Mohammad Esmail Nazar (Steel Azin)

=== Paykan ===
In: Note: Flags indicate national team as defined under FIFA eligibility rules; some limited exceptions apply. Players may hold more than one non-FIFA nationality.

No.	Pos.	Nation	Player
—	MF	IRI	Majid Khodabandelo (from Mes Kerman F.C.)
--	FW	IRI	Alireza Abbasfard (from Esteghlal)

Out: Note: Flags indicate national team as defined under FIFA eligibility rules; some limited exceptions apply. Players may hold more than one non-FIFA nationality.

No.	Pos.	Nation	Player
12	GK	IRI	Hassan Roudbarian (to Tractor Sazi)
22	GK	IRI	Mohammad Mohammadi (to Esteghlal)
22	FW	IRI	Mehdi Seyed Salehi (to Esteghlal)
--	MF	IRI	Morteza Aziz-Mohammadi (to PAS Hamedan)

=== Persepolis ===
In: Note: Flags indicate national team as defined under FIFA eligibility rules; some limited exceptions apply. Players may hold more than one non-FIFA nationality.

No.	Pos.	Nation	Player
33	GK	IRI	Mohammad Hossein Naeiji (from Esteghlal)
13	DF	IRI	Sheys Rezaei (from Saba)
17	DF	IRI	Jalal Akbari (from Sepahan FC)
18	DF	IRI	Ebrahim Shakouri (from Payam)
7	MF	IRI	Mohammad Parvin (from (Slovakia) Dunajská Streda)
10	MF	IRI	Maysam Baou (from Aboomoslem)
14	MF	IRI	Saman Aghazamani (from Saipa)
15	MF	IRI	Saeid Hallafi (from Sanat Naft Abadan F.C.)
21	MF	IRQ	Hawar Mulla Mohammed (from (Cyprus) Anorthosis FC)
25	MF	IRI	Mehdi Shiri (from Bargh Shiraz)
27	MF	BRA	Tiago Alves Fraga (from (Brazil) Mixto)
40	MF	IRI	Adel Kolahkaj (from Saba)
8	FW	GER	Shpejtim Arifi (from Payam)
19	FW	IRI	Akbar Saghiri (from Petrochimi Tabriz)
28	FW	BRA	Wésley Brasilia de Almeida (from (Brazil) Brasiliense)
30	FW	IRI	Mojtaba Zarei (from Rah Ahan)

Out: Note: Flags indicate national team as defined under FIFA eligibility rules; some limited exceptions apply. Players may hold more than one non-FIFA nationality.

No.	Pos.	Nation	Player
1	GK	IRI	Mehdi Vaezi (to Saba)
30	GK	IRI	Mohsen Elyasi (to Shensa Arak F.C.)
2	DF	IRI	Masoud Zarei (to Mes)
15	DF	IRI	Mohammad Alavi (to Foolad)
32	DF	TOG	Franck Atsou (to Esteghlal Ahvaz)
33	DF	IRI	Rahman Rezaei (to (Qatar) Al-Ahli Doha)
8	MF	IRI	Ali Karimi (to Steel Azin)
11	MF	IRI	Maziar Zare (to (United Arab Emirates) Emirates Club)
18	MF	IRI	Pejman Nouri (to Malavan)
20	MF	IRI	Bahador Abdi (to Shahin Bushehr)
21	MF	SRB	Ivan Petrović (to Shahin Bushehr)
44	MF	IRI	Amirhossein Ipakchi (to Petrochimi Tabriz)
10	FW	IRI	Alireza Vahedi Nikbakht (to Steel Azin F.C.)
17	FW	SEN	Ibrahima Touré (to Sepahan)
28	FW	IRI	Farhad Kheirkhah (to Tractor Sazi)

=== Rah Ahan ===
In: Note: Flags indicate national team as defined under FIFA eligibility rules; some limited exceptions apply. Players may hold more than one non-FIFA nationality.

No.	Pos.	Nation	Player
--	FW	IRI	Milad Zanidpour (from Saipa F.C.)
--	FW	IRI	Farid Abedi (from Bargh Shiraz)
--	FW	IRI	Majid Bajlan (from Zob Ahan)
--	MF	IRI	Hossein Koushki (from Payam Mashhad)
--	FW	IRI	Mohsen Zahedi (from Payam Mashhad)
--	MF	MLI	Issa Traoré (from Saipa FC)
--	GK	IRI	Farshid Karimi (from Damash Gilan)
--	FW	SYR	Mohamed Al Zeno (from Al-Majd)
--	MF	SYR	Mahmoud Al Amenah (from Al-Ittihad)
--	MF	IRQ	Salih Sadir (from Al-Ahed)

Out: Note: Flags indicate national team as defined under FIFA eligibility rules; some limited exceptions apply. Players may hold more than one non-FIFA nationality.

No.	Pos.	Nation	Player
1	GK	IRI	Hossein Ashena (to Foolad)
24	FW	IRI	Sohrab Entezari (to Shahrdari Tabriz F.C.)
20	MF	ARM	Hamlet Mkhitaryan (to FC Banants)
—	MF	URU	Cesar Pellegrin (Rampla Juniors)
11	MF	IRI	Mojtaba Zarei (to Persepolis F.C.)
10	MF	IRI	Davoud Haghi (to Saba Qom F.C.)
19	FW	URU	Álvaro Pintos (to Club Jorge Wilstermann)
—	FW	IRI	Amin Torkashvand (to Damash Gilan)

=== Saipa ===
In: Note: Flags indicate national team as defined under FIFA eligibility rules; some limited exceptions apply. Players may hold more than one non-FIFA nationality.

No.	Pos.	Nation	Player
--	MF	IRI	Mehdi Kheiri (from Saba Qom)
--	MF	IRI	Morteza Ebrahimi (from Mes Kerman)
--	FW	IRI	Reza Khaleghifar (from Moghavemat Sepasi)
--	MF	IRI	Dariush Yazdani (from Teraktor Sazi)
--	DF	IRI	Vache Gevorkian (from Ararat FC)
--	DF	IRI	Morteza Izadi Zardalou (from Steel Azin)

Out: Note: Flags indicate national team as defined under FIFA eligibility rules; some limited exceptions apply. Players may hold more than one non-FIFA nationality.

No.	Pos.	Nation	Player
10	MF	IRI	Kianoush Rahmati (to Esteghlal)
13	DF	IRI	Hossein Kaebi (to Steel Azin)
4	MF	IRI	Jalal Hosseini (to Sepahan)
25	MF	IRI	Saman Aghazamani (to Persepolis)
24	MF	MLI	Issa Traoré (to Rah Ahan)

=== Saba Qom ===
In: Note: Flags indicate national team as defined under FIFA eligibility rules; some limited exceptions apply. Players may hold more than one non-FIFA nationality.

No.	Pos.	Nation	Player
--	GK	IRI	Mehdi Vaezi (from Persepolis F.C.)
--	DF	IRI	Ebrahim Taghipour (from Esteghlal F.C.)
--	MF	IRI	Davoud Haghi (from Rah Ahan F.C.)

Out: Note: Flags indicate national team as defined under FIFA eligibility rules; some limited exceptions apply. Players may hold more than one non-FIFA nationality.

No.	Pos.	Nation	Player
1	GK	BIH	Almir Tolja (To Nassaji Mazandaran F.C.)
13	DF	IRI	Sheys Rezaei (to Persepolis F.C.)
16	DF	IRI	Shahin Shafie (to Damash Gilan)
--	MF	IRI	Mehdi Kheiri (to Saipa)
28	MF	IRI	Ali Amiri (to Damash Gilan)
--	FW	IRI	Mostafa Haghipour (to Damash Gilan)
10	DF	IRI	Adel Kolahkaj (to Persepolis F.C.)
3	MF	IRI	Amir Azhari (to Damash Gilan)
--	MF	IRI	Mostafa Mehdizade (to Shahrdari Tabriz)

=== Sepahan ===
In: Note: Flags indicate national team as defined under FIFA eligibility rules; some limited exceptions apply. Players may hold more than one non-FIFA nationality.

No.	Pos.	Nation	Player
1	GK	IRI	Mehdi Rahmati (from Mes Kerman)
6	DF	IRI	Jalal Hosseini (from Saipa)
14	DF	IRI	Ahmad Alenemeh (from Foolad)
11	MF	IRI	Mehdi Karimian (from Bargh Shiraz)
12	MF	IRI	Shahin Kheiri (from Zob Ahan)
10	FW	SEN	Ibrahima Touré (from Persepolis)

Out: Note: Flags indicate national team as defined under FIFA eligibility rules; some limited exceptions apply. Players may hold more than one non-FIFA nationality.

No.	Pos.	Nation	Player
—	MF	IRI	Hamed Kiani (to Damash Iranian F.C.)
6	DF	IRI	Jalal Akbari (to Persepolis F.C.)
40	MF	CMR	Jacques Elong Elong (to Dunajská Streda)
--	MF	IRI	Farshad Bahadorani (to Aboomoslem)
--	MF	IRI	Ebrahim Lovinian (to Aboomoslem)
--	FW	IRI	Rasoul Khatibi (to Foolad Gostar)
27	MF	IRI	Abolhassan Jafari (to Malavan)
11	FW	IRI	Hadi Asghari (to Pas Hamedan)

=== Shahin Bushehr ===
In: Note: Flags indicate national team as defined under FIFA eligibility rules; some limited exceptions apply. Players may hold more than one non-FIFA nationality.

No.	Pos.	Nation	Player
12	MF	NGR	Obaji Sunday (from Unknown)
17	FW	IRI	Abbas Porkhosravani (from Gol Gohar)
21	MF	SRB	Ivan Petrović (from Persepolis)
8	MF	IRI	Bahador Abdi (from Persepolis)
40	FW	IRI	Mohammad Ahmadpouri (from Shirin Faraz)
19	FW	BRA	Luciano Valente (from Foolad)
2	MF	IRI	Mohsen Hamidi (from PAS Hamedan)
--	MF	IRI	Mehdi Kiani (from Mes Kerman)
--	MF	IRI	Habib Houshyar (from Damash Gilan)
--	MF	IRI	Mehdi Noori (from Damash Gilan)
--	FW	IRQ	Mohammad Nasser Shakroun (from Esteghlal Ahvaz)

Out: Note: Flags indicate national team as defined under FIFA eligibility rules; some limited exceptions apply. Players may hold more than one non-FIFA nationality.

No.	Pos.	Nation	Player
13	DF	IRI	Alireza Zalaki Badil (from Foolad Novin)
5	DF	IRI	Abbas Mardasi
13	DF	IRI	Hasan Atashi

=== Steel Azin ===
In: Note: Flags indicate national team as defined under FIFA eligibility rules; some limited exceptions apply. Players may hold more than one non-FIFA nationality.

No.	Pos.	Nation	Player
1	GK	IRI	Ali Nazarmohammadi (from Damash Gilan)
13	DF	IRI	Hossein Kaebi (from Saipa)
4	DF	IRI	Kazem Borjlou (from Saipa)
5	DF	IRI	Mohammad Esmail Nazar (from PAS Hamedan)
20	MF	IRI	Mohammadali Ashourizad (from Damash Gilan)
11	MF	IRI	Mohammad Reza Mahdavi (from Damash Gilan)
28	MF	IRI	Reza Rahmati (from PAS Hamedan)
3	MF	IRI	Meysam Khosravi (from Paykan)
7	MF	IRI	Ferydoon Zandi (from Alki Larnaca)
23	MF	IRI	Hamed Kavianpour (from Free agent)
8	MF	IRI	Ali Karimi (from Persepolis F.C.)
10	FW	IRI	Afshin Chavoshi (from Damash Gilan)
9	FW	IRI	Mohammad Gholami (from PAS Hamedan)
11	FW	IRI	Amir Shapourzadeh (from FSV Frankfurt)
40	FW	IRI	Alireza Vahedi Nikbakht (from Persepolis F.C.)

Out: Note: Flags indicate national team as defined under FIFA eligibility rules; some limited exceptions apply. Players may hold more than one non-FIFA nationality.

No.	Pos.	Nation	Player
--	MF	IRI	Morteza Izadi (to Saipa)
2	DF	MLI	Alou Badra Diakité (to Nassaji Mazandaran F.C.)
--	MF	MKD	Ardijan Nuhiji (to FK Rabotnički)
--	MF	TOG	Kassim Guyazou (to Gostaresh Foolad F.C.)
9	MF	ENG	Jacques Williams (to Free agent)

=== Tractor Sazi ===
In: Note: Flags indicate national team as defined under FIFA eligibility rules; some limited exceptions apply. Players may hold more than one non-FIFA nationality.

No.	Pos.	Nation	Player
1	GK	IRI	Hassan Roudbarian (from Paykan)
20	DF	IRI	Mohammad Nosrati (from Al-Nasr)
34	DF	MLI	Alou Traoré (from Saipa)
8	MF	IRI	Mehrdad Pooladi (from Esteghlal)
13	MF	IRQ	Karrar Jassim (from Al-Wakrah)
9	FW	IRI	Farhad Kheirkhah (from Persepolis)
11	FW	BRA	Leonardo Andre Pimenta Faria (from Hatta Club)
40	FW	NGR	Daniel Olerum (from Aboomoslem)
--	FW	IRI	Masoud Abtahi (from Shahin Bushehr)

Out: Note: Flags indicate national team as defined under FIFA eligibility rules; some limited exceptions apply. Players may hold more than one non-FIFA nationality.

No.	Pos.	Nation	Player

=== Zob Ahan ===
In: Note: Flags indicate national team as defined under FIFA eligibility rules; some limited exceptions apply. Players may hold more than one non-FIFA nationality.

No.	Pos.	Nation	Player
--	MF	IRI	Jalal Omidian (from Mes Kerman)
--	FW	IRI	Mohammad Ghazi (from Foolad)
--	DF	POL	Andrzej Bednarz (from Radomiak Radom)

Out: Note: Flags indicate national team as defined under FIFA eligibility rules; some limited exceptions apply. Players may hold more than one non-FIFA nationality.

No.	Pos.	Nation	Player
1	GK	SEN	Issa Ndoye (to FC Volyn Lutsk)
--	MF	IRI	Shahin Kheiri (to Sepahan)
--	FW	IRI	Majid Bajlan (to Rah Ahan)

== Azadegan League ==
=== Aluminium Hormozgan ===
In: Note: Flags indicate national team as defined under FIFA eligibility rules; some limited exceptions apply. Players may hold more than one non-FIFA nationality.

No.	Pos.	Nation	Player
-	GK	IRI	Ahmad Khormali (from Aboomoslem)

Out: Note: Flags indicate national team as defined under FIFA eligibility rules; some limited exceptions apply. Players may hold more than one non-FIFA nationality.

No.	Pos.	Nation	Player

=== Bargh Shiraz ===
In: Note: Flags indicate national team as defined under FIFA eligibility rules; some limited exceptions apply. Players may hold more than one non-FIFA nationality.

No.	Pos.	Nation	Player
—	FW	IRI	Ahmad Khaziravi (from Esteghlal F.C.)
1	GK	URU	Martín Barlocco (from Mes Rafsanjan)
10	FW	IRI	Ali Alizadeh (from Esteghlal)
--	MF	IRI	Mohammad Pourmand (from Moghavemat Shiraz)
--	MF	IRI	Jamal Abassi (from Moghavemat Shiraz)
--	DF	IRI	Ali Peyrovani (from Moghavemat Shiraz)

Out: Note: Flags indicate national team as defined under FIFA eligibility rules; some limited exceptions apply. Players may hold more than one non-FIFA nationality.

No.	Pos.	Nation	Player
—	FW	BIH	Alen Avdić (to FK Sarajevo)
—	FW	BRA	William Moreno (released)

=== Damash Gilan ===
In: Note: Flags indicate national team as defined under FIFA eligibility rules; some limited exceptions apply. Players may hold more than one non-FIFA nationality.

No.	Pos.	Nation	Player
--	FW	IRI	Reza Taheri (from Foolad)
--	MF	IRI	Amin Torkashvand (from Rah Ahan)
--	DF	IRI	Shahin Shafie (from Saba Qom)
--	MF	IRI	Ali Amiri (from Saba Qom)
--	FW	IRI	Mohsen Rasouli (from Esteghlal Ahvaz)
--	FW	IRI	Mostafa Haghipour (from Saba Qom)
--	FW	IRI	Yunes Geraeili (from Moghavemat Sepasi)
--	DF	IRI	Reza Aghamohammadi (from Naft Tehran)
--	MF	IRI	Amir Azhari (from Saba Qom)
--	DF	IRQ	Ahmad Wale Zeyd (from Al-Talaba)
--	MF	IRI	Mehrzad Rezaei (from Esteghlal Ahvaz)
--	GK	BRA	Edgar Gomez Rodriguez (from América Futebol Clube)
--	GK	IRI	Mohsen Forouzanfar (from Malavan)

Out: Note: Flags indicate national team as defined under FIFA eligibility rules; some limited exceptions apply. Players may hold more than one non-FIFA nationality.

No.	Pos.	Nation	Player
10	FW	IRI	Afshin Chavoshi (to Steel Azin)
1	GK	IRI	Ali Nazarmohammadi (to Steel Azin)
11	MF	IRI	Mohammad Reza Mahdavi (to Steel Azin)
15	MF	IRI	Behnam Afsheh (to Moghavemat Sepasi)
7	DF	IRI	Reza Niknazar (to Nassaji Mazandaran)
6	MF	IRI	Mehdi Noori (to Shahin Bushehr)
5	DF	IRI	Ali Ashourizad (to Steel Azin)
4	MF	IRI	Habib Houshyar (to Shahin Bushehr)
16	MF	IRI	Amir Hossein Yousefi (to Mes Kerman)
22	GK	IRI	Farshid Karimi (to Rah Ahan)
3	MF	SRB	Ivan Dragičević (to Damash Iranian F.C.)
27	FW	IRI	Hossein Ebrahimi (to Malavan)
21	FW	BRA	Adriano Alvez (to Malavan)
8	DF	IRI	Alireza Nazifkar (to Nassaji Mazandaran)
17	DF	CMR	William Djongo (to Free agent)

=== Damash Iranian F.C. ===
In: Note: Flags indicate national team as defined under FIFA eligibility rules; some limited exceptions apply. Players may hold more than one non-FIFA nationality.

No.	Pos.	Nation	Player
—	MF	SRB	Dušan Petronijević (From FK Napredak Kruševac)
—	MF	SRB	Ivan Dragičević (from Damash Gilan F.C.)
—	GK	ARM	Felix Hakobyan (from Mika Yerevan)

Out: Note: Flags indicate national team as defined under FIFA eligibility rules; some limited exceptions apply. Players may hold more than one non-FIFA nationality.

No.	Pos.	Nation	Player

=== Foolad Novin F.C. ===
In: Note: Flags indicate national team as defined under FIFA eligibility rules; some limited exceptions apply. Players may hold more than one non-FIFA nationality.

No.	Pos.	Nation	Player
15	FW	IRI	Mahmoud Veisinejad (from Shahin Ahvaz)
24	FW	IRI	Alireza Rezaei (from Tarbiat Yazd)
32	GK	IRI	Amin Jahanmehr (from Foolad)
21	DF	IRI	Amin Hejazi (from Foolad)
3	DF	IRI	Ali Mardan Khalteh (from Foolad)
23	DF	IRI	Reza Mardani (from Foolad)
12	MF	IRI	Saeed Moradi (from Foolad)
14	MF	IRI	Hossein Salami (from Sanat Naft Abadan F.C.)
16	MF	IRI	Ali Obeidavi (from Foolad)
18	FW	IRI	Mehdi Chajouei (from Foolad)
13	DF	IRI	Alireza Zalaki Badil (from Shahin Bushehr)
22	MF	IRI	Rasoul Zamani (from Esteghlal Ahvaz)
18	FW	IRI	Ahmad Bozar (from Esteghlal Ahvaz)

Out: Note: Flags indicate national team as defined under FIFA eligibility rules; some limited exceptions apply. Players may hold more than one non-FIFA nationality.

No.	Pos.	Nation	Player

=== Gostaresh Foolad F.C. ===
In: Note: Flags indicate national team as defined under FIFA eligibility rules; some limited exceptions apply. Players may hold more than one non-FIFA nationality.

No.	Pos.	Nation	Player
—	GK	AZE	Ruslan Medzhidov (from FK Gänclärbirliyi Sumqayit)
--	MF	TOG	Kassim Guyazou (from Steel Azin F.C.)
—	DF	CMR	Thomas Manga (From R. Jet Wavre)
—	MF	MLI	Makan Dembélé (From USFAS Bamako)
—	FW	IRI	Rasoul Khatibi (From Sepahan)

Out: Note: Flags indicate national team as defined under FIFA eligibility rules; some limited exceptions apply. Players may hold more than one non-FIFA nationality.

No.	Pos.	Nation	Player

=== Mes Rafsanjan F.C. ===
In: Note: Flags indicate national team as defined under FIFA eligibility rules; some limited exceptions apply. Players may hold more than one non-FIFA nationality.

No.	Pos.	Nation	Player
—	MF	COL	Carlos Salazar (From Atlético Huila)
—	GK	POR	Fábio Carvalho (From Aluminium Arak F.C.)
—	DF	MLI	Sékou Fofana (From Mes Kerman F.C.)

Out: Note: Flags indicate national team as defined under FIFA eligibility rules; some limited exceptions apply. Players may hold more than one non-FIFA nationality.

No.	Pos.	Nation	Player
1	GK	URU	Martín Barlocco (to Bargh Shiraz)

=== Naft Tehran F.C. ===
In: Note: Flags indicate national team as defined under FIFA eligibility rules; some limited exceptions apply. Players may hold more than one non-FIFA nationality.

No.	Pos.	Nation	Player
—	GK	TKM	Maksatmyrat Şamyradow (From FC Aşgabat)

Out: Note: Flags indicate national team as defined under FIFA eligibility rules; some limited exceptions apply. Players may hold more than one non-FIFA nationality.

No.	Pos.	Nation	Player

=== Nassaji Mazandaran ===
In: Note: Flags indicate national team as defined under FIFA eligibility rules; some limited exceptions apply. Players may hold more than one non-FIFA nationality.

No.	Pos.	Nation	Player
—	MF	IRI	Emad Ghasemi (From Pas Hamedan F.C.)
—	MF	IRI	Asghar Nadali (From Esteghlal F.C.)
—	DF	IRI	Mohsen Rahimi (From Foolad F.C.)
—	DF	MLI	Alou Badra Diakité (From Steel Azin F.C.)
—	DF	IRI	Ebrahim Taghipour (From Esteghlal F.C.)
—	MF	BRA	Mateus Alonso Honorio (From Ankaragücü)
—	GK	BIH	Almir Tolja (From Saba Qom F.C.)
--	FW	MLI	Founéké Sy (From Jeanne d'Arc)
--	DF	IRI	Reza Niknazar (From Damash Gilan)
--	DF	IRI	Alireza Nazifkar (From Damash Gilan)

Out: Note: Flags indicate national team as defined under FIFA eligibility rules; some limited exceptions apply. Players may hold more than one non-FIFA nationality.

No.	Pos.	Nation	Player
--	DF	IRI	Mohammad Mokhtari (to Iranjavan F.C.)

=== Sanati Kaveh Tehran ===
In: Note: Flags indicate national team as defined under FIFA eligibility rules; some limited exceptions apply. Players may hold more than one non-FIFA nationality.

No.	Pos.	Nation	Player
—	FW	ARM	Galust Petrosyan (from Ulisses F.C.)

Out: Note: Flags indicate national team as defined under FIFA eligibility rules; some limited exceptions apply. Players may hold more than one non-FIFA nationality.

No.	Pos.	Nation	Player

=== Shensa Arak ===
In: Note: Flags indicate national team as defined under FIFA eligibility rules; some limited exceptions apply. Players may hold more than one non-FIFA nationality.

No.	Pos.	Nation	Player
33	FW	BRA	Tiago Cavalcanti (from Campinense Clube)
15	MF	BRA	Leonardo Rimes (from Alki Larnaca FC)
—	GK	IRI	Mohsen Eliasi (from Persepolis)

Out: Note: Flags indicate national team as defined under FIFA eligibility rules; some limited exceptions apply. Players may hold more than one non-FIFA nationality.

No.	Pos.	Nation	Player

=== Payam Mashhad ===
In: Note: Flags indicate national team as defined under FIFA eligibility rules; some limited exceptions apply. Players may hold more than one non-FIFA nationality.

No.	Pos.	Nation	Player

Out: Note: Flags indicate national team as defined under FIFA eligibility rules; some limited exceptions apply. Players may hold more than one non-FIFA nationality.

No.	Pos.	Nation	Player
--	MF	IRI	Mohammad Sahimi (to Shahrdari Tabriz)

=== Shahin Ahvaz F.C. ===
In: Note: Flags indicate national team as defined under FIFA eligibility rules; some limited exceptions apply. Players may hold more than one non-FIFA nationality.

No.	Pos.	Nation	Player

Out: Note: Flags indicate national team as defined under FIFA eligibility rules; some limited exceptions apply. Players may hold more than one non-FIFA nationality.

No.	Pos.	Nation	Player
15	FW	IRI	Mahmoud Veisinejad (to Foolad Novin)

=== Shahrdari Tabriz ===
In: Note: Flags indicate national team as defined under FIFA eligibility rules; some limited exceptions apply. Players may hold more than one non-FIFA nationality.

No.	Pos.	Nation	Player
--	MF	IRI	Mohammad Sahimi (from Payam Mashhad)
—	GK	SRB	Đorđe Babalj (from FK Vojvodina)
--	MF	IRI	Mohsen Giahi (from Malavan)
--	FW	IRI	Sohrab Entezari (from Rah Ahan)
--	MF	IRI	Mostafa Mehdizade (from Saba Qom)

Out: Note: Flags indicate national team as defined under FIFA eligibility rules; some limited exceptions apply. Players may hold more than one non-FIFA nationality.

No.	Pos.	Nation	Player

=== Sanat Naft Abadan F.C. ===
In: Note: Flags indicate national team as defined under FIFA eligibility rules; some limited exceptions apply. Players may hold more than one non-FIFA nationality.

No.	Pos.	Nation	Player
—	MF	ARM	Levon Pachajyan (from GAIS Göteborg)
—	FW	IRI	Hojat Chaharmahali (from Foolad F.C.)
—	DF	IRI	Reza Jalali Sabet (From Esteghlal Ahvaz F.C.)
—	MF	BRA	Gabriel (From Unattached)
—	MF	IRI	Mehrdad Mir (From Shahrdari Tabriz F.C.)
—	DF	IRI	Reza Jalali (from Foolad)
—	MF	BRA	Sandro Gaúcho (From Foolad F.C.)

Out: Note: Flags indicate national team as defined under FIFA eligibility rules; some limited exceptions apply. Players may hold more than one non-FIFA nationality.

No.	Pos.	Nation	Player
7	MF	BRA	Renato Medeiros (from Released)

=== Tarbiat Yazd F.C. ===
In: Note: Flags indicate national team as defined under FIFA eligibility rules; some limited exceptions apply. Players may hold more than one non-FIFA nationality.

No.	Pos.	Nation	Player

Out: Note: Flags indicate national team as defined under FIFA eligibility rules; some limited exceptions apply. Players may hold more than one non-FIFA nationality.

No.	Pos.	Nation	Player
24	FW	IRI	Alireza Rezaei (to Foolad Novin)
—	FW	IRI	Rasoul Kor (from Shamoushak Noshahr F.C.)
