= Farshid Karimi =

Iranian footballer

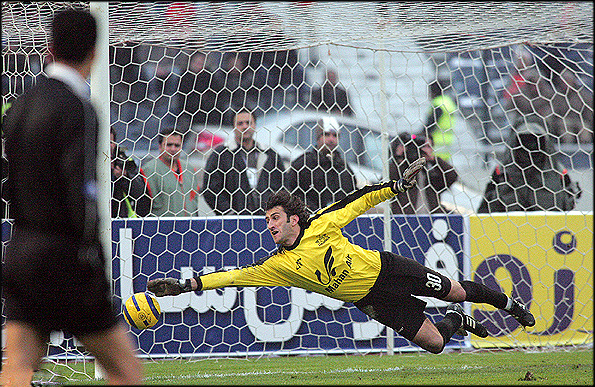
- Karimi (2006)

Personal information
- Full name: Farshid Karimi Pashaki
- Date of birth: May 10, 1976 (age 50)
- Place of birth: Lahijan, Gilan province, Iran
- Height: 1.88 m (6 ft 2 in)
- Position: Goalkeeper

Youth career
- 1989–1999: Naft Tehran
- 1999–2000: Shetab-Khodro

Senior career*
Years	Team	Apps	(Gls)
2000–2008	Persepolis	53	(0)
2008–2009	Damash Gilan	6	(0)
2009–2013	Rah Ahan	63	(0)
2013	Aluminium		
- * Club domestic league appearances and goals

Farshid Karimi (Persian: فرشید كریمی, born May 10, 1976) is a retired Iranian football goalkeeper. He is older brother of Ali Karimi.

== Club career ==
=== Persepolis ===
He started his career with Persepolis in 2000 when the club needed a goalkeeper, and he was introduced to 2007–08 Ali Parvin by Sadegh Doroudgar to be on trial with the club. He joined Persepolis and played 8 seasons for them. He was Persepolis's first choice goalkeeper during 2005–06 and 2006–07 seasons, and he became one of the key players of the team in the 2005–06 Hazfi Cup. In the 2007–08 season, he became a benchwarmer after Hassan Roudbarian and Mehdi Vaezi and played just one match, which was his last appearance for Persepolis. On the match on February 10, 2008, against Aboumoslem he played mistakenly, conceding 3 goals in the first half and was booed by the fans, In the half time, he was asked by IRIB Reporter about his performance. "I have nothing to say", he replied. Persepolis scored in the second half making a 3–3 draw.

=== Damash ===
He moved to the Gilani Club Damash in 2008–09 and was Second Goalie of Ali Nazarmohammadi. He had problems with the club after Amir Abedini did not pay his wage in time, so he complained and left training. Abedini fired him from the club. He was later fined about $2000 of his contract due to "his insolence to Chairman Abedini" and returned to trainings after compromise with the club.

=== Rah Ahan ===
He joined Rah Ahan in 2009. He played one season alongside Masoud Homami. He remained in the next season with the club. Other goalies were Hassan Roudbarian and Saleh Khalil Azad. He rejected a transfer to Steel Azin in December 2010. He was released by the club on 1 July 2013.

=== Aluminium ===
In summer 2013, he signed a two years contract with Aluminium, who relegated from Iran Pro League to Division 1 last season.

=== Club career statistics ===
As of 10 May 2013

Club performance			League		Cup		Continental		Total	
Season	Club	League	Apps	Goals	Apps	Goals	Apps	Goals	Apps	Goals
Iran			League		Hazfi Cup		Asia		Total	
2000–01	Persepolis	Azadegan League	0	0	0	0	0	0	0	0
2001–02	Persepolis	Pro League	3	0	1	0	–		4	0
2002–03	Persepolis	Pro League	6	0		0	0	0		0
2003–04	Persepolis	Pro League	0	0		0	–			0
2004–05	Persepolis	Pro League	3	0		0	–			0
2005–06	Persepolis	Pro League	19	0	6	0	–		25	0
2006–07	Persepolis	Pro League	21	0	3	0	–		24	0
2007–08	Persepolis	Pro League	1	0	0	0	–		1	0
2008–09	Damash	Pro League	6	0	0	0	–		6	0
2009–10	Rah Ahan	Pro League	16	0	0	0	–		16	0
2010–11	Rah Ahan	Pro League	12	0	1	0	–		13	0
2011–12	Rah Ahan	Pro League	14	0	0	0	–		14	0
2012–13	Rah Ahan	Pro League	22	0	0	0	–		22	0
2013–14	Aluminium	Division 1	0	0	0	0	–		0	0
Career total			113				0	0		

== International career ==
He was called up for team melli once by Amir Ghalenoei in 2006, but never made a debut.

== Honours ==
Persepolis

- Iran Pro League (2): 2001–02, 2007–08
