= Mohsen Eliasi =

Iranian Footballer

Personal information
- Full name: Mohsen Eliasi
- Date of birth: 3 June 1985 (age 41)
- Place of birth: Iran
- Position: Goalkeeper

Team information
- Current team: Shahrdari Arak

Youth career
- 2005–2007: Persepolis

Senior career*
Years	Team	Apps	(Gls)
2007–2008	Homa	0	(0)
2008–2009	Persepolis	0	(0)
2009–2010	Shensa Arak	14	(0)
2010–2012	Steel Azin	39	(0)
2012–	Shahrdari Arak	0	(0)
- * Club domestic league appearances and goals

Mohsen Eliasi (Persian: محسن الیاسی) (born June 3, 1985) is an Iranian footballer who currently plays for Shahrdari Arak in Azadegan League.

== Club career ==
He moved to Persepolis but because of two other good keepers Alireza Haghighi and Mehdi Vaezi he did not have any chance of playing. He moved to Shensa Arak in summer 2009.
