= Mehdi Tajik =

Iranian footballer

Personal information
- Full name: Mehdi Tajik
- Date of birth: March 11, 1979 (age 47)
- Place of birth: Iran
- Position: Defender

Team information
- Current team: Peykan
- Number: 4

Senior career*
Years	Team	Apps	(Gls)
2003–	Peykan		(5)
- * Club domestic league appearances and goals as of 29 August 2010 ‡ National team caps and goals as of 08 May 2010

Mehdi Tajik (born March 11, 1979) is an Iranian Football player who currently plays for Paykan of the Iran Pro League.

== Club career ==
=== Club career statistics ===
Last Update 30 September 2010

Club performance			League		Cup		Continental		Total	
Season	Club	League	Apps	Goals	Apps	Goals	Apps	Goals	Apps	Goals
Iran			League		Hazfi Cup		Asia		Total	
2003–04	Paykan	Persian Gulf Cup		2			-	-		
2004–05	Paykan	Persian Gulf Cup		0			-	-		
2005–06	Paykan	Azadegan League		0			-	-		
2006–07	Paykan	Persian Gulf Cup	19	0	2	0	-	-	21	0
2007–08	Paykan	Persian Gulf Cup	26	1	1	0	-	-	27	1
2008–09	Paykan	Persian Gulf Cup	24	1	1	0	-	-	25	1
2009–10	Paykan	Persian Gulf Cup	25	0			-	-		
2010–11	Paykan	Persian Gulf Cup	18	1	0	0	-	-	18	1
Total	Iran			5			0	0		
Career total				5			0	0		

- Assist Goals

Season	Team	Assists
10–11	Paykan	0
