= Masoud Mikaeili =

Iranian footballer

Personal information
- Full name: Masoud Mikaeili
- Date of birth: 5 February 1987 (age 39)
- Place of birth: Rasht, Iran
- Position: Center back

Team information
- Current team: Sepidrood

Youth career
- 2001–2007: Pegah Gilan

Senior career*
Years	Team	Apps	(Gls)
2005–2008	Pegah Gilan	8	(0)
2008–2011	Damash	63	(0)
2011–2012	Pas Hamedan	13	(1)
2012–2013	Paykan	26	(0)
2014–2015	Sepidrood		
2016–	Damash		
- * Club domestic league appearances and goals as of 12 September 2014 (UTC)

Masoud Mikaeili (Persian: مسعود میکائیلی; born 5 February 1987) is an Iranian footballer who plays for Sepidrood in the Iran Football's 2nd Division.

== Club career ==
Mikaeili started his career with Pegah Gilan F.C. In summer 2012 he joined newly promoted, Paykan.

=== Club career statistics ===
As of 12 September 2014

Club performance			League		Cup		Continental		Total	
Season	Club	League	Apps	Goals	Apps	Goals	Apps	Goals	Apps	Goals
Iran			League		Hazfi Cup		Asia		Total	
2005–06	Pegah Gilan	Division 1	0	0	0	0	–		0	0
2006–07	Pegah Gilan	Division 1	4	0	0	0	–		4	0
2007–08	Pegah Gilan	Pro League	4	0			–			
2008–09	Damash	Pro League	18	0			–			
2009–10	Damash	Division 1	26	0	3	0	–		29	0
2010–11	Damash	Division 1	19	0	1	0	–		20	0
2011–12	Pas Hamedan	Division 1	13	1	0	0	–		13	1
2012–13	Paykan	Pro League	26	0	1	0	–		27	0
Career total			110	1			0	0		
