= Siamak Koohnavard =

Iranian footballer

Personal information
- Full name: Siamak Koohnavard
- Date of birth: 21 July 1984 (age 42)
- Place of birth: Iran
- Position: Midfielder

Team information
- Current team: Bargh Jadid
- Number: 4

Youth career
- Fajr Sepasi

Senior career*
Years	Team	Apps	(Gls)
2006–2010	Fajr Sepasi	82	(5)
2010–2011	Naft Tehran	6	(0)
2011–2013	Sanat Naft	53	(2)
2013–2014	Fajr Sepasi	22	(1)
2014–2016	Rah Ahan	40	(0)
2016	Gostaresh Foulad	5	(0)
2017–	Bargh Jadid	?	(?)
- * Club domestic league appearances and goals as of 21 January 2016

Siamak Koohnavard (Persian: سیامک کوهنورد; born 21 July 1984) is an Iranian Football player who currently plays for Bargh Jadid Shiraz FC of the Azadegan League.

== Club career ==
Koohnavard has played his entire career for Moghavemat Sepasi.

=== Club career statistics ===
As of 21 January 2016

Club	Division	Season	League		Hazfi Cup		Asia		Total	
Club	Division	Season	Apps	Goals	Apps	Goals	Apps	Goals	Apps	Goals
Moghavemat	Pro League	2006–07	1	0			-	-	1	0
Moghavemat	Pro League	2007–08	21	0			-	-	21	0
Moghavemat	Pro League	2008–09	31	2		0	-	-	31	2
Moghavemat	Pro League	2009–10	29	3		0	-	-	29	3
Naft Tehran	Pro League	2010–11	6	0			-	-		
Sanat Naft	Pro League	2011–12	27	2	2	0	-	-	29	2
Sanat Naft	Pro League	2012–13	26	0			-	-		
Fajr Sepasi	Pro League	2013–14	22	1			-	-		
Rah Ahan	Pro League	2014–15	26	0	2	0	-	-	28	0
Rah Ahan	Pro League	2015–16	14	0	1	1	-	-	15	1
Gostaresh	Pro League	2015–16	7	0	0	0	-	-	7	0
Career total			210	8			-	-		

- Assist Goals

Season	Team	Assists
09–10	Moghavemat	3
11–12	Sanat Naft	1
