= Milad Nosrati =

Iranian former footballer

Personal information
- Full name: Milad Nosrati
- Date of birth: 16 March 1990 (age 36)
- Place of birth: Karaj, Iran
- Height: 1.86 m (6 ft 1 in)
- Position: Defender

Youth career
- 2007: Rah Ahan

Senior career*
Years	Team	Apps	(Gls)
2008	Rah Ahan		
2009	Tractor		
2011	Gahar Zagros		
2012	Damash Gilan		
2013	Damash Tehran		
2013	Saipa		
2015	Nirooye Zamini		
2019	Shohadaye Razakan Alborz		

International career
- Iran U23
- * Club domestic league appearances and goals as of 13 September 2024

Milad Nosrati (Persian: میلاد نصرتی, born 1990 March 16) is an Iranian former footballer who played as a midfielder for football clubs Rah Ahan, Tractor Sazi, Saipa, and Damash Gilan in the Persian Gulf Pro League.
