= Morteza Izadi Zardalou =

Iranian footballer

Personal information
- Full name: Morteza Izadi Zardalou
- Date of birth: August 21, 1981 (age 45)
- Place of birth: Sanandaj, Iran
- Height: 1.78 m (5 ft 10 in)
- Position: Defender

Team information
- Current team: Shahrdari Arak

Youth career
- Saipa

Senior career*
Years	Team	Apps	(Gls)
2004–2005	Saipa	9	(0)
–2007	Shahrdari Bandar Abbas	?	(3)
2008	Steel Azin	?	(2)
2009–2010	Saipa	13	(0)
2010	Nassaji		
2010–2011	Naft Tehran	6	(0)
2011–2012	Shahrdari Arak		

International career^{‡}
2003	Iran U-23		
- * Club domestic league appearances and goals as of 10 September 2010 ‡ National team caps and goals as of 21 November 2009

Morteza Izadi Zardalou born on August 21, 1981, is an Iranian footballer who plays for Shahrdari Arak in the Iranian Premier League.

== Club career ==
Izadi started his career with Shahrdari Bandar Abbas and Steel Azin in the Azadegan League before moving to Saipa in 2009.

Club performance			League	
Season	Club	League	Apps	Goals
Iran			League	
2008–09	Steel Azin	Division 1		
2009–10	Saipa	Pro League	13	0
2009–10	Nassaji	Division 1	5	0
2010–11	Naft Tehran	Pro League	15	0
Total	Iran			2
Career total				2

- Assist Goals

Season	Team	Assists
10–11	Naft Tehran	1

== International ==
In 2003, Izadi Featured for Iran U-23 in their qualifying match in Japan.
