= Almir Tolja =

Bosnian footballer (born 1974)

Personal information
- Date of birth: 25 October 1974 (age 51)
- Place of birth: Travnik, SFR Yugoslavia
- Height: 1.87 m (6 ft 2 in)
- Position: Goalkeeper

Senior career*
Years	Team	Apps	(Gls)
- NK Travnik
1995–1997	Zenica	46	(0)
1999–2000	FK Sarajevo	10	(0)
2000–2002	Čelik Zenica	34	(0)
2002–2005	SW Bregenz	91	(0)
2005–2009	Saba Battery	106	(0)
2009–2010	Nassaji	14	(0)
Total		301	(0)

International career
- Bosnia U21
2000–2006	Bosnia and Herzegovina	14	(0)
2001	Bosnia and Herzegovina XI	1	(0)
- * Club domestic league appearances and goals

Almir Tolja (born 25 October 1974) is a Bosnian former professional footballer who played as a goalkeeper. He made 14 appearances the Bosnia and Herzegovina national team. He was the goalkeeping coach of NK Čelik Zenica in the 2011–12 season under Vlatko Glavaš.

== International career ==
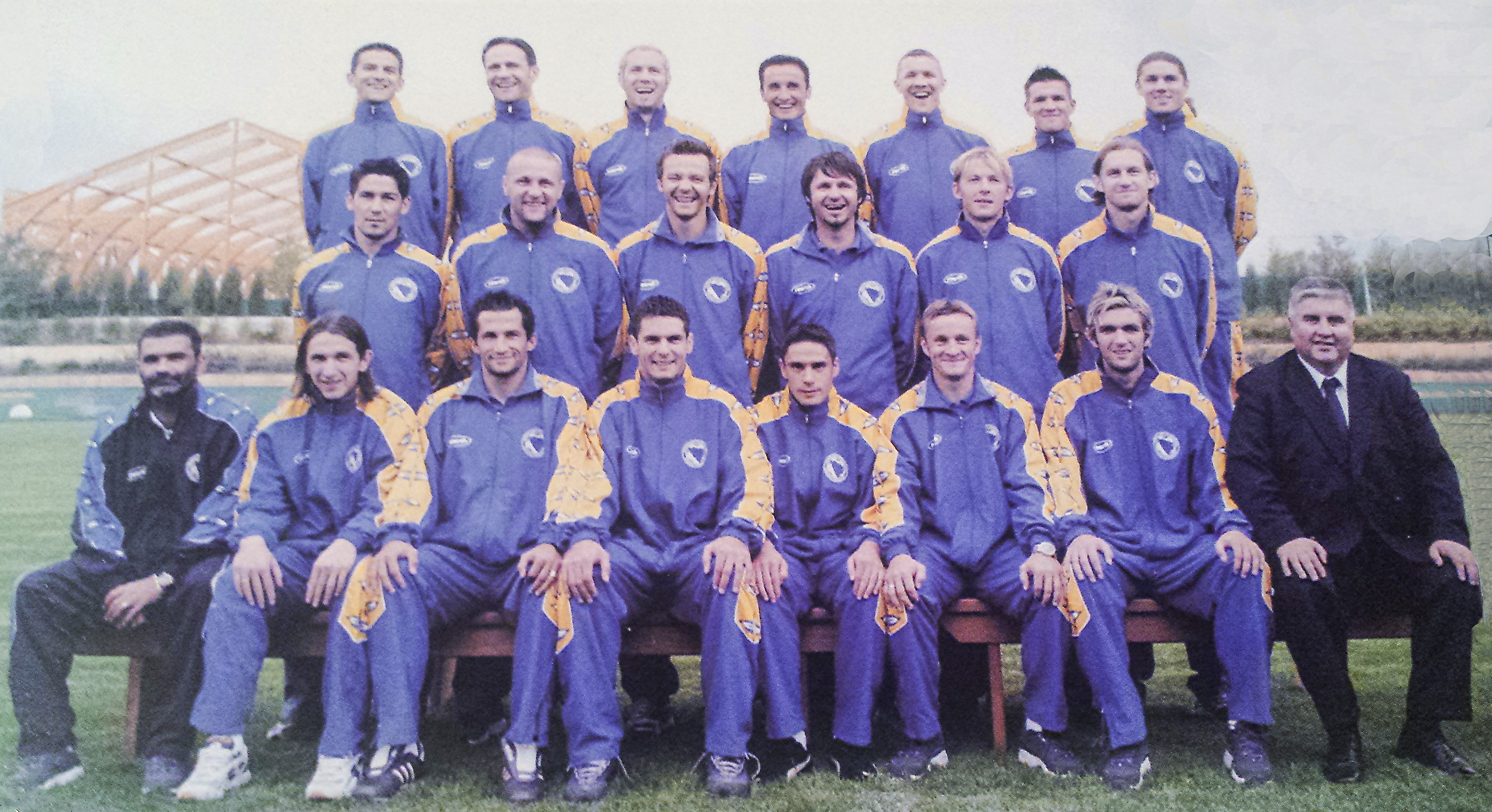
Bosnia-Herzegovina squad during UEFA Euro 2004 qualifying

Tolja made his debut for Bosnia and Herzegovina in a March 2000 friendly match away against Jordan and has earned a total of 15 caps (1 unofficial), scoring no goals. His final international was an October 2006 European Championship qualification against Greece, coming on as a half time replacement of Kenan Hasagić.

== Career statistics ==
Last update: 25 January 2010

Season	Team	Country	Division	Apps	Goals
95/96	Zenica	Bosnia and Herzegovina	1	17	0
96/97	Zenica	Bosnia and Herzegovina	1	29	0
00/01	NK Čelik Zenica	Bosnia and Herzegovina	1	24	0
01/02	NK Čelik Zenica	Bosnia and Herzegovina	1	10	0
02/03	SC Bregenz	Austria	1	36	0
03/04	SC Bregenz	Austria	1	27	0
04/05	SC Bregenz	Austria	1	26	0
05/06	Saba	Iran	1	28	0
06/07	Saba	Iran	1	28	0
07/08	Saba	Iran	1	28	0
08/09	Saba	Iran	1	22	0
09/10	Nassaji	Iran	2	14	0
