= Milad Rakhshan =

Iranian footballer (born 1986)

Personal information
- Full name: Milad Rakhshan Araghi
- Date of birth: 21 September 1986 (age 40)
- Place of birth: Arak, Iran
- Height: 1.83 m (6 ft 0 in)
- Position: Midfielder

Youth career
- Hepco Arak

Senior career*
Years	Team	Apps	(Gls)
2009–2010	Shensa	23	(2)
2010–2011	Sanat Naft Abadan F.C.	4	(0)
- * Club domestic league appearances and goals as of 25 April 2010 (UTC) ‡ National team caps and goals as of 26 March 2010

Milad Rakhshan (born September 30, 1986) is an Iranian footballer who plays for Sanat Naft Abadan F.C. in the IPL.

== Club career ==
In 2010, Rakhshan joined Sanat Naft Abadan F.C. after spending the previous season at Shensa in the Azadegan League.

Club performance			League		Cup		Continental		Total	
Season	Club	League	Apps	Goals	Apps	Goals	Apps	Goals	Apps	Goals
Iran			League		Hazfi Cup		Asia		Total	
2009–10	Shensa	Azadegan	23	2	0	0	-	-	23	2
2010–11	Sanat Naft Abadan F.C.	Persian Gulf Cup	4	0	0	0	-	-	4	0
Total	Iran		27	2	0	0	0	0	27	2
Career total			27	2	0	0	0	0	27	2

- Assists

Season	Team	Assists
2010–11	Sanat Naft Abadan F.C.	0
