= Leonardo (footballer, born 1979) =

Brazilian footballer

Personal information
- Full name: Leonardo Rimes da Cunha
- Date of birth: 12 July 1979 (age 47)
- Place of birth: Rio de Janeiro, Brazil
- Height: 1.79 m (5 ft 10 in)
- Position: Right back

Senior career*
Years	Team	Apps	(Gls)
1999–2000	Ermesinde	11	(1)
2000–2002	Torres Novas		
2002–2004	Ribeirão		
2004–2005	Leixões	20	(0)
2005–2006	Moreirense	14	(0)
2006–2007	Messinense	16	(1)
2007–2008	Vila Meã	27	(0)
2008	Torreense	8	(0)
2009	Alki Larnaca		
2009–2010	Shensa Arak		
Total		96	(2)
- * Club domestic league appearances and goals

Leonardo Rimes da Cunha (born 12 July 1979, in Rio de Janeiro), known simply as Leonardo, is a Brazilian retired footballer who played as a right back.
