= Eshagh Sobhani =

Iranian footballer

Personal information
- Full name: Seyyed Eshagh Sobhani
- Date of birth: January 14, 1984 (age 42)
- Place of birth: Kerman, Iran
- Position: Defensive midfielder

Senior career*
Years	Team	Apps	(Gls)
2009–2011	Mes Sarcheshmeh	39	(11)
2011–2014	Saipa	79	(3)
- * Club domestic league appearances and goals

Eshagh Sobhani is an Iranian footballer.

== Club career ==
Sobhani joined Saipa F.C. in 2011, after playing the previous two seasons at Mes Sarcheshmeh in the Azadegan League.

Club performance			League		Cup		Continental		Total	
Season	Club	League	Apps	Goals	Apps	Goals	Apps	Goals	Apps	Goals
Iran			League		Hazfi Cup		Asia		Total	
2009–10	Mes; Sarcheshme	Division 1	17	2	0	0	-	-	17	2
2010–11	Mes; Sarcheshme	Division 1	22	9	0	0	-	-	22	9
2011–12	Saipa	Pro League	26	0	1	0	-	-	27	0
2012–13	Saipa	Pro League	26	0	1	0	-	-	27	0
2012–14	Saipa	Pro League	27	3	1	0	-	-	28	3
Career total			118	14	3	0	0	0	121	14

- Assist Goals

Season	Team	Assists
11/12	Saipa	0

== External sources ==
- Persianleague Profile
- Eshagh Sobhani at Soccerway (archived)
