= Farzad Mohammadi =

Iranian footballer

Personal information
- Full name: Farzad Mohammadi
- Date of birth: 20 September 1987 (age 39)
- Place of birth: Urmia, Iran
- Position: Forward

Team information
- Current team: Machine Sazi
- Number: 17

Senior career*
Years	Team	Apps	(Gls)
2009–2010	Kowsar		(1)
2010–2011	Naft Masjed Soleyman		(7)
2011–2012	Damash	7	(0)
2012–2014	Naft Masjed Soleyman	37	(16)
2014	Mes Kerman	2	(0)
2014–2015	Naft Masjed Soleyman	23	(4)
2015–2016	Machine Sazi	23	(5)
2016–2017	Naft Masjed Soleyman	10	(0)
2016–2017	Esteghlal Ahvaz	2	(0)
2018–2019	Navad Urmia	18	(11)
2019–2020	Mes Rafsanjan	7	(4)
2019–2020	Sepidrood	4	(0)
2020–2021	Machine Sazi	9	(1)
2020–2022	Kheybar FC	18	(6)
2024–2025	Setaregan Sorkh		
- * Club domestic league appearances and goals as of 29 June 2015 ‡ National team caps and goals as of 29 June 2015

Farzad Mohammadi (Persian: فرزاد محمدی; born 20 September 1987) is an Iranian footballer who plays for Setaregan Sorkh in the Iranian 2nd division as a center-forward. He was born on 20 September 1987, in Urmia, West Azerbaijan.
