= Saeid Yousefzadeh =

Iranian footballer

Saeed Yousefzadeh
Personal information
- Date of birth: 30 January 1987 (age 39)
- Place of birth: Bandar Anzali, Iran
- Height: 1.86 m (6 ft 1 in)
- Position: Defensive midfielder

Youth career
- –2004: Malavan

Senior career*
| Years | Team | Apps | (Gls) |
| 2005–2009 | Malavan | 103 | (5) |
| 2009–2011 | Saipa | 60 | (2) |
| 2011–2017 | Malavan | 166 | (3) |
| 2017–2018 | Aluminium Arak | 22 | (0) |
- * Club domestic league appearances and goals

Saeed Yousefzadeh (Persian: سعید یوسف‌زاده; born 30 January 1987) is an Iranian former footballer.

== Club career ==
Yousefzadeh joined Saipa in 2010, after spending the previous 4 seasons at Malavan.

| Club performance | | | League | | Cup | | Continental | | Total | |
| Season | Club | League | Apps | Goals | Apps | Goals | Apps | Goals | Apps | Goals |
| Iran | | | League | | Hazfi Cup | | Asia | | Total | |
|---|---|---|---|---|---|---|---|---|---|---|
| 2005–06 | Malavan | Pro League | 24 | 0 | 1 | 0 | – | – | 25 | 0 |
| 2006–07 | Malavan | Pro League | 22 | 1 | 1 | 0 | – | – | 23 | 1 |
| 2007–08 | Malavan | Pro League | 33 | 2 | 1 | 0 | – | – | 34 | 2 |
| 2008–09 | Malavan | Pro League | 24 | 2 | 2 | 0 | – | – | 26 | 2 |
| 2009–10 | Saipa | Pro League | 29 | 2 | 1 | 0 | – | – | 30 | 0 |
| 2010–11 | Saipa | Pro League | 31 | 0 | 1 | 0 | – | – | 32 | 0 |
| 2011–12 | Malavan | Pro League | 31 | 0 | 1 | 0 | – | – | 32 | 0 |
| 2012–13 | Malavan | Pro League | 31 | 0 | 1 | 0 | – | – | 32 | 0 |
| 2013–14 | Malavan | Pro League | 29 | 0 | 2 | 0 | – | – | 31 | 0 |
| 2014–15 | Malavan | Pro League | 28 | 1 | 1 | 0 | – | – | 29 | 1 |
| Career total | | | 282 | 8 | 12 | 0 | 0 | 0 | 294 | 8 |

- Assist Goals

| Season | Team | Assists |
|---|---|---|
| 2010–11 | Saipa | 0 |
| 2011–12 | Malavan | 0 |
