= Saman Safa =

Iranian football player (born 1984)

Personal information
- Full name: Saman Safa
- Date of birth: September 12, 1984 (age 42)
- Place of birth: Tehran, Iran
- Position: Goalkeeper

Youth career
- –2006: Pas

Senior career*
Years	Team	Apps	(Gls)
2006–2007	Pas	5	(0)
2007–2009	PAS Hamedan	29	(0)
2009–2010	Mes Kerman	14	(0)
2010–2011	PAS Hamedan	26	(0)
2011–2012	Foolad	0	(0)
- * Club domestic league appearances and goals as of 3 August 2011

Saman Safa (Persian: سامان صفا, born September 12, 1984) is an Iranian football player. He has most recently played for the Iran's Premier Football League club Foolad as a goalkeeper.

== Club career ==
A product of the Pas Tehran’s youth system, Safa was drafted into the first team for the IPL 2006/07 season. At the end of the season Pas F.C. officially dissolved, and Safa moved to PAS Hamedan.

=== Club career statistics ===
Last Update: 3 August 2011

Club performance			League		Cup		Continental		Total	
Season	Club	League	Apps	Goals	Apps	Goals	Apps	Goals	Apps	Goals
Iran			League		Hazfi Cup		Asia		Total	
2006-07	Pas	Persian Gulf Cup	5	0		0	-	-		0
2007-08	PAS Hamedan	Persian Gulf Cup	10	0	1	0	-	-	11	0
2008-09	PAS Hamedan	Persian Gulf Cup	19	0	0	0	-	-	19	0
2009-10	Mes	Persian Gulf Cup	14	0	2	0	5	0	21	0
2010-11	PAS Hamedan	Persian Gulf Cup	26	0	0	0	-	-	7	0
2011-12	Foolad	Persian Gulf Cup	0	0	0	0	-	-	0	0
Career total			74	0		0	5	0		0
