= Mehdi Vaezi =

Iranian footballer (born 1975)

Personal information
- Full name: Mehdi Vaezi
- Date of birth: 6 March 1975 (age 51)
- Place of birth: Azadshahr, Golestan, Iran
- Height: 1.89 m (6 ft 2 1/2 in)
- Position: Goalkeeper

Youth career
- 1992–1993: Sanati Electric Khorasan
- 1993–1995: Payam Khorasan

Senior career*
Years	Team	Apps	(Gls)
1995–1998	Payam		
1998–2000	Bahman		
2000–2006	Paykan		
2006–2009	Persepolis	41	(0)
2009–2011	Saba	27	(0)
2011–2012	Steel Azin		
2012–2013	Machine Sazi	4	(0)

International career^{‡}
1997–2008	Iran	2	(0)
- * Club domestic league appearances and goals as of 3 October 2010 ‡ National team caps and goals as of 10 January 2008

Mehdi Vaezi (born 6 March 1975 in Azadshahr, Iran) is a former Iranian football player. He has lived and grew up in Mashhad between ages of 7 until 23.

== Club career ==
Vaezi played for Paykan Tehran F.C. before moving to Persepolis F.C. in 2006 on a 2-year deal. Earlier that year he was involved in a drug abuse scandal which ended in a 6-month ban from football and the breakdown of a transfer to F.C. Zob Ahan. Eventually he signed for Persepolis F.C.

During the 2006/07 season he only played a few matches for Persepolis behind the first keeper Farshid Karimi who had an adequate season but during the 2007/08 season he was the first choice keeper for most of the games but never played in the Tehran derby. This season went well for him because he was known for his saves and reflects but more importantly the fans preferred him over the other keepers such as international Goalkeeper Hassan Roudbarian and the previous season's first choice Farshid Karimi.

During the 2008/09 Vaezi had many injuries which made him sit out many matches and a lot of critics believe that if he was not injured as much Persepolis would have done better in the league.

=== Club Career statistics ===
Last Update 19 October 2010

Club performance			League		Cup		Continental		Total	
Season	Club	League	Apps	Goals	Apps	Goals	Apps	Goals	Apps	Goals
Iran			League		Hazfi Cup		Asia		Total	
2003–04	Paykan	Persian Gulf Cup	21	0	2	0	-	-	23	0
2004–05	Paykan	Persian Gulf Cup	28	0	1	0	-	-	29	0
2005–06	Paykan	Azadegan League	20	0	0	0	-	-	20	0
2006–07	Persepolis	Persian Gulf Cup	6	0	1	0	-	-	7	0
2007–08	Persepolis	Persian Gulf Cup	22	0	2	0	-	-	24	0
2008–09	Persepolis	Persian Gulf Cup	13	0	2	0	1	0	16	0
2009–10	Saba	Persian Gulf Cup	7	0	0	0	-	-	7	0
2010–11	Saba	Persian Gulf Cup	20	0	1	0	-	-	21	0
Total	Iran			0		0	1	0		0
Career total				0		0	1	0		0

== International career ==
On 17 March 1997 he made the 31-man list for the national team but did not get selected for any games He made his debut for Iran in a friendly match against Georgia in August 2000. He was called up to join the squad in a few occasions, including in 2007, but did not make any other appearance for Team Melli before January 2008, when he made his second cap in a friendly match against Qatar.

== Honours ==
- Iran's Premier Football League Winner: 1
  - 2007/08 with Persepolis
