= Martín Barlocco =

Uruguayan footballer (born 1977)

Personal information
- Full name: Martín Raúl Barlocco Canale
- Date of birth: 19 December 1977 (age 48)
- Place of birth: Montevideo, Uruguay
- Height: 1.85 m (6 ft 1 in)
- Position: Goalkeeper

Team information
- Current team: Rocha

Senior career*
Years	Team	Apps	(Gls)
1999–2000	Fénix		
2000–2003	El Tanque Sisley		
2003	Basañez		
2003	Pumas de Casanare		
2004	Deportes Quindío	5	(0)
2004–2005	Deportivo Colonia	29	(0)
2005–2006	River Plate		
2006–2007	Rampla Juniors	10	(0)
2007–2008	Bargh Shiraz	29	(0)
2008–2009	Mes Rafsanjan		(0)
2009–2011	Bargh Shiraz	49	(0)
2011–2012	Gostaresh	20	(0)
2012–2013	Rampla Juniors	10	(0)
2013–2014	Rocha	27	(0)
2014–2015	Atenas	25	(0)
2015–2016	Deportivo Maldonado	17	(0)
2017–	Rocha		

International career
2001	Uruguay B	2	(0)
- * Club domestic league appearances and goals as of 6 April 2017 (UTC)

Martín Raúl Barlocco Canale (born 19 December 1977, in Montevideo) is a Uruguayan football goalkeeper who currently plays for Rocha in the Uruguayan Segunda División.

== Club career ==
Martín Barlocco goalkeeper began his career with Fénix in 1999 and played there until 2000. He then went to El Tanque Sisley from 2000 to 2001. He moved to Iran in 2007 and played for Bargh Shiraz in Iran Pro League for one season.

== Career statistics ==
=== Club ===
Last Update 2 May 2010

Club performance			League		Cup		Continental		Total	
Season	Club	League	Apps	Goals	Apps	Goals	Apps	Goals	Apps	Goals
Iran			League		Hazfi Cup		Asia		Total	
2007–08	Bargh	Pro League	29	0	3	0	–		32	0
2008–09	Mes Rafsanjan	Division 1	?	0		0	–			0
2009–10	Bargh	Division 1	25	0		0	–			0
2010–11	Bargh	Division 1	24	0	0	0	–		24	0
2011–12	Gostaresh	Division 1	20	0	1	0	–		21	0
Total	Iran			0		0	0	0		0
Career total				0		0	0	0		0
