= Hassan Roudbarian =

Iranian footballer

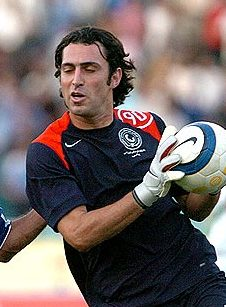

Personal information
- Full name: Hassan Roudbarian
- Date of birth: July 6, 1978 (age 48)
- Place of birth: Qazvin, Iran
- Height: 1.83 m (6 ft 0 in)
- Position: Goalkeeper

Youth career
- Nirou Moharekeh

Senior career*
Years	Team	Apps	(Gls)
1999–2007	Pas Tehran	78	(0)
2007–2008	Persepolis	11	(0)
2008–2009	Paykan	6	(0)
2009–2010	Tractor Sazi	10	(0)
2010–2012	Rah Ahan	45	(0)
2012–2013	Damash	15	(0)
2013–2014	Mes Kerman	15	(0)

International career^{‡}
2006–2007	Iran	17	(0)
2006	Iran U–23 (Wild Card)	7	(0)
- * Club domestic league appearances and goals as of 4 February 2014 ‡ National team caps and goals as of 9 January 2008

Hassan Roudbarian (Persian: حسن رودباریان, born July 6, 1978, in Qazvin, Iran) is a retired Iranian football goalkeeper.

== Club career ==
He has played most of his career for Pas Tehran. He became well known during Pas's 2003–04 championship season, where he was able to start most of the games, despite competing with former national goalkeeper, Nima Nakisa.

In 2007 after Pas officially dissolved, he joined Iranian giants Persepolis.

=== Club Career Statistics ===
Last Update 4 February 2014

Club performance			League		Cup		Continental		Total	
Season	Club	League	Apps	Goals	Apps	Goals	Apps	Goals	Apps	Goals
Iran			League		Hazfi Cup		Asia		Total	
2003–04	Pas	Pro League	22	0		0		0		0
2004–05	Pas	Pro League	12	0		0		0		0
2005–06	Pas	Pro League	28	0		0		0		0
2006–07	Pas	Pro League	15	0		0	–	–		0
2007–08	Persepolis	Pro League	11	0	1	0	–	–	12	0
2008–09	Paykan	Pro League	6	0	1	0	–	–	7	0
2009–10	Tractor	Pro League	10	0		0	–	–		0
2010–11	Rah Ahan	Pro League	24	0	0	0	–	–	24	0
2011–12	Rah Ahan	Pro League	21	0	1	0	–	–	22	0
2012–13	Damash	Pro League	15	0	2	0	–	–	17	0
2013–14	Mes Kerman	Pro League	13	0	1	0	–	–	13	0
Career total			177	0		0		0		0

== International career ==
He had been called up to the national team many times, during the past few seasons, but received his first international cap for the Iranian national team on March 1, 2006, versus Costa Rica. He was also selected for the final Iran squad that went to Germany for World Cup 2006 where he served as the backup to Ebrahim Mirzapour. He later captured the starting job under new coach Amir Ghalenoei in time for the 2007 AFC Asian Cup.

== Honours ==
Pas Tehran

- Iran Pro League: 2003–04

Runner-up: 2002–03, 2005–06

Persepolis

- Iran Pro League: 2007–08

Mes Kerman

- Hazfi Cup: 2013–14 (Runner-up)

Iran U23 (Wild card)

- Asian Games Bronze Medal: 2006
