= 2013–14 Persepolis F.C. season =

Persepolis
2013–14 season
- Chairman: Ali Parvin
- Manager: Ali Daei
- Stadium: Azadi Stadium
- Iran Pro League: 2nd
- Hazfi Cup: Quarter-finals
- Top goalscorer: League: Mohammad Reza Khalatbari; Mehdi Seyed Salehi (6 goals); All: Mohammad Reza Khalatbari; Mehdi Seyed Salehi; Mohammad Abbaszadeh (6 goals)
- Highest home attendance: 95,000 (17 January 2014 against Esteghlal)
- Lowest home attendance: 1,000 (23 October 2013 against Padideh)
- Average home league attendance: League: 27,200 All: 25,706
| Home colours | Away colours |

The 2013–14 season was the Persepolis's 13th season in the Pro League, and their 31st consecutive season in the top division of Iranian Football. They were also competing in the Hazfi Cup but were eliminated by Foolad in Quarter-finals. Persepolis was captained by Mohammad Nouri.

== Key events ==
- 20 May: Ali Daei was officially announced as the club's manager for the season. He joined the club with a three-year contract.
- 25 May: Former Saipa's winger, Milad Gharibi signed two-years contract as the season's first signing.
- 26 May: Daei introduces Javad Manafi, Behzad Gholampour, Reza Forouzani, Mohammadreza Molaei, Mohammad Daei and Karim Bagheri as his assistants. Also Mehrdad Kafshgari and Mohammad Abbaszadeh joined The Reds. Both of them signed three-years contracts. Abbaszadeh became 2012–13 Azadegan League top scorer with 18 goals in 23 match while Kafshgari spent previous season at Rah Ahan Sorinet.
- 27 May: Alireza Nourmohammadi extending for another one-years and Hadi Norouzi & Mohammad Nouri extending for another two-years.
- 29 May: After rumors around signing of Mehdi Rahmati and Rahman Ahmadi, Persepolis extends with Brazilian goalkeeper Nilson Corrêa for another year.
- 1 June: Farshad Ahmadzadeh was loaned to Tractor Sazi to spend conscription period till December 2014.
- 3 June: The Club officially announced that Reza Haghighi will part of team for 2013–14 season. That mean Persepolis rejected bids from Dynamo Kyiv and Brøndby IF for the player. Also Mehrdad Pouladi extends until 2014 and Meysam Hosseini signed two-years contract.
- 9 June: Payam Sadeghian & The Club finally reached to an agreement for two seasons. former Iran national under-17 football team captain will join The Reds as 28 June.
- 11 June: Former Tractor Sazi striker, Mehdi Seyed Salehi officially joined The Reds with a two-year contract. Omid Alishah also signed two-years contract. Both of them will join training camp as 13 June.
- 3 July: Former Tractor Sazi defensive midfielder, Ghasem Dehnavi officially joined The Reds with a one-year contract.
- 4 July: Marko Šćepanović came to Iran on 1 July 2013 and also trained with the team for three days and participated in a friendly match with Persepolis shirt. Finally Marko Šćepanović officially joined The Reds with a one-year contract on 4 July. He scored 14 goals in 28 matches in Montenegrin First League 2012–13. He is a former Podgoricai player.
- 18 July: Alireza Haghighi returned to Persepolis on loan from Rubin Kazan and signed a contract for half a season with the club.
- 1 September: Sepahan's winger, Mohammad Reza Khalatbari signed two-years contract with a record fee. He was given the number 99 shirt.
- 15 September: Afshin Esmaeilzadeh was loaned to Beira-Mar till 30 June 2014.
- 18 November: Mohammadreza Khanzadeh was loaned to Zob Ahan till 10 May 2014.
- 18 November: Mohsen Mosalman joined to Persepolis on loan from Zob Ahan till 10 May 2014.
- 26 November: Younes Shakeri was loaned to Padideh till 31 March 2014.
- 27 November: Hadi Norouzi was loaned to Naft Tehran till 10 May 2014.

== Squad ==
=== First team squad ===
| No. | Name | Age | Nationality | Position (s) | Since | App | Goals | Assist | Ends | Previous club | Transfer fee | Notes |
Goalkeepers
| 1 | Reza Mohammadi | 27 | (Iran) | GK | 2013 (W) | 1 | 0 | 0 | 2015 | (Iran) Sepahan | Free | |
| 21 | Amir Abedzadeh | 20 | (Iran) | GK | 2012 | 0 | 0 | 0 | 2015 | (United States) L.A Blues | €100,000 | U-21 Players; Originally from Youth Team |
| 40 | Nilson Corrêa | 38 | (Brazil) | GK | 2012 | 64 | 0 | 0 | 2014 | (Portugal) Guimarães | Free | Second nationality: Burkina Faso |
Defenders
| 4 | Jalal Hosseini | 31 | (Iran) | CB / RB | 2012 | 64 | 2 | 0 | 2014 | (Iran) Sepahan | Free | Vice-Captain |
| 6 | Mohsen Bengar | 34 | (Iran) | CB | 2012 | 58 | 0 | 1 | 2014 | (Iran) Sepahan | Free | |
| 12 | Meysam Hosseini | 26 | (Iran) | LB / CB / DM | 2013 | 26 | 0 | 0 | 2015 | (Iran) Naft Tehran | Free | |
| 13 | Hossein Mahini | 27 | (Iran) | RB / LB / RM | 2012 | 62 | 2 | 7 | 2015 | (Iran) Zob Ahan | Free | |
| 15 | Hossein Kanaani | 19 | (Iran) | CB / RB | 2012 (W) | 1 | 0 | 0 | 2014 | Youth Team | | U-21 Players |
| 16 | Mehrdad Pouladi | 26 | (Iran) | LB / CM / LM / DM | 2012 (W) | 37 | 1 | 1 | 2015 | (Iran) Mes | Free | |
| 20 | Alireza Nourmohammadi | 32 | (Iran) | CB / LB | 2010 | 105 | 8 | 1 | 2014 | (Iran) Rah Ahan Sorinet | Free | |
| 25 | Farshad Ghasemi | 20 | (Iran) | RB / RM / RW | 2013 | 1 | 0 | 0 | 2016 | Youth Team | | U-21 Players |
Midfielders
| 2 | Omid Alishah | 21 | (Iran) | LM / LW / RM / RW | 2013 | 20 | 3 | 0 | 2015 | (Iran) Rah Ahan Sorinet | Free | U-23 Players |
| 5 | Ghasem Dehnavi | 32 | (Iran) | CM / DM / AM / RM | 2013 | 23 | 1 | 0 | 2014 | (Iran) Tractor Sazi | Free | |
| 7 | Hamidreza Aliasgari | 23 | (Iran) | RM / RW / RB / LM / LW / LB | 2007 | 117 | 8 | 8 | 2015 | Youth Team | | U-23 Players |
| 9 | Reza Haghighi | 24 | (Iran) | DM / CM | 2013 (W) | 46 | 3 | 2 | 2015 | (Iran) Fajr Sepasi | €250,000 | |
| 14 | Mohammad Nouri | 30 | (Iran) | AM / CM / DM | 2010 | 144 | 33 | 17 | 2015 | (Iran) Saba Qom | Free | Captain |
| 18 | Mehrdad Kafshgari | 26 | (Iran) | DM / CM | 2013 | 20 | 1 | 2 | 2016 | (Iran) Rah Ahan Sorinet | Free | |
| 19 | Milad Kamandani | 19 | (Iran) | AM / CM | 2013 | 2 | 0 | 0 | 2016 | Youth Team | | U-21 Players |
| 77 | Mohsen Mosalman | 22 | (Iran) | AM / CM / RM / LM / SS | 2013 | 13 | 2 | 2 | 2014 | (Iran) Zob Ahan | Free | U-23 Players on loan from Zob Ahan |
Forwards
| 11 | Payam Sadeghian | 21 | (Iran) | SS / AM / LW / RW | 2013 | 28 | 3 | 8 | 2015 | (Iran) Zob Ahan | Free | U-23 Players |
| 23 | Mehdi Seyed Salehi | 32 | (Iran) | CF / SS | 2013 | 28 | 6 | 0 | 2015 | (Iran) Tractor Sazi | Free | |
| 33 | Mohammad Abbaszadeh | 22 | (Iran) | CF / SS / RW / LW | 2013 | 15 | 6 | 0 | 2016 | (Iran) Nassaji | €125,000 | U-23 Players |
| 64 | Farzad Hatami | 27 | (Iran) | CF | 2013 | 9 | 1 | 0 | 2014 | (Iran) Foolad | Free | |
| 99 | Mohammad Reza Khalatbari | 30 | (Iran) | RW / LW / SS / AM | 2013 | 24 | 6 | 5 | 2015 | (United Arab Emirates) Ajman | €610,000 | |
Players transferred during the season
| 3 | Mohammadreza Khanzadeh | 22 | (Iran) | CB / RB / LB | 2012 | 22 | 0 | 3 | 2015 | On loan at Zob Ahan | | |
| 8 | Marko Šćepanović | 31 | (Montenegro) | CM / DM / AM | 2013 | 1 | 0 | 0 | Released | | | |
| 10 | Gholamreza Rezaei | 29 | (Iran) | RW / LW / ST | 2010 | 99 | 13 | 20 | Transferred to Foolad | | | |
| 17 | Younes Shakeri | 24 | (Iran) | CF | 2013 | 7 | 1 | 0 | 2016 | On loan at Padideh | | |
| 22 | Milad Gharibi | 21 | (Iran) | RM / RW / LM / LW | 2013 | 3 | 1 | 1 | 2015 | On loan at Zob Ahan | | |
| 24 | Hadi Norouzi | 28 | (Iran) | SS / RW / LW / ST | 2008 | 151 | 31 | 18 | 2015 | On loan at Naft Tehran | | |
| 31 | Afshin Esmaeilzadeh | 21 | (Iran) | AM / CM / RM | 2012 | 1 | 0 | 0 | 2015 | On loan at Beira-Mar | | |
| 32 | Farshad Ahmadzadeh | 21 | (Iran) | AM / LW / ST / SS | 2012 | 2 | 0 | 0 | 2015 | On loan at Tractor Sazi | | |
| 88 | Alireza Haghighi | 25 | (Iran) | GK | 2013 | 95 | 0 | 0 | Loan return to Rubin Kazan | | | |
| | Karim Ansarifard | 23 | (Iran) | CF | 2012 | 36 | 12 | 5 | 2015 | On loan at Tractor Sazi | | |

Apps and goals updated as of 11 April 2014

For more on the reserve and academy squads, see Persepolis Novin, Persepolis Academy, Persepolis Shomal & Persepolis Qaem Shahr.

Source: fc-perspolis.com, FFIRI.IR

=== Iran Pro League squad ===
Updated 3 December 2013.

Note: Flags indicate national team as defined under FIFA eligibility rules; some limited exceptions apply. Players may hold more than one non-FIFA nationality.

| No. | Pos. | Nation | Player |
|---|---|---|---|
| 1 | GK | IRI | Reza Mohammadi |
| 2 | MF | IRI | Omid Alishah ^{U23} |
| 4 | DF | IRI | Jalal Hosseini (vice-captain) |
| 5 | MF | IRI | Ghasem Dehnavi |
| 6 | DF | IRI | Mohsen Bengar |
| 7 | MF | IRI | Hamidreza Aliasgari ^{U23} |
| 9 | MF | IRI | Reza Haghighi |
| 11 | MF | IRI | Payam Sadeghian ^{U23} |
| 12 | DF | IRI | Meysam Hosseini |
| 13 | DF | IRI | Hossein Mahini |
| 14 | MF | IRI | Mohammad Nouri (captain) |
| 15 | DF | IRI | Hossein Kanaani ^{U21} |

| No. | Pos. | Nation | Player |
|---|---|---|---|
| 16 | DF | IRI | Mehrdad Pouladi |
| 18 | MF | IRI | Mehrdad Kafshgari |
| 19 | MF | IRI | Milad Kamandani ^{U21} |
| 20 | DF | IRI | Alireza Nourmohammadi (3rd captain) |
| 21 | GK | IRI | Amir Abedzadeh ^{U21} |
| 23 | FW | IRI | Mehdi Seyed Salehi |
| 25 | DF | IRI | Farshad Ghasemi ^{U21} |
| 33 | FW | IRI | Mohammad Abbaszadeh ^{U23} |
| 40 | GK | BRA | Nilson Corrêa Júnior |
| 64 | FW | IRI | Farzad Hatami |
| 77 | MF | IRI | Mohsen Mosalman ^{U23} (on loan from Zob Ahan) |
| 99 | FW | IRI | Mohammad Reza Khalatbari |

- U21 = Under 21 Player
- U23 = Under 23 Player

==== Loan list ====
Note: Flags indicate national team as defined under FIFA eligibility rules; some limited exceptions apply. Players may hold more than one non-FIFA nationality.

| No. | Pos. | Nation | Player |
|---|---|---|---|
| 3 | DF | IRI | Mohammadreza Khanzadeh (at Zob Ahan till 10 April 2014) |
| 17 | FW | IRI | Younes Shakeri (at Padideh till 7 April 2014) |
| 22 | MF | IRI | Milad Gharibi (at Zob Ahan till 10 April 2014) |
| 24 | FW | IRI | Hadi Norouzi (at Naft Tehran till 10 April 2014) |

| No. | Pos. | Nation | Player |
|---|---|---|---|
| 31 | MF | IRI | Afshin Esmaeilzadeh (at Beira-Mar till 30 June 2014) |
| 32 | MF | IRI | Farshad Ahmadzadeh (at Tractor Sazi till December 2014) |
| — | FW | IRI | Karim Ansarifard (at Tractor Sazi till 10 April 2014) |

For recent transfers, see List of Iranian football transfers summer 2013 & List of Iranian football transfers winter 2013–14.
For more on the reserve and academy squads, see Persepolis Novin, Persepolis Academy, Persepolis Shomal & Persepolis Qaem Shahr.

== Transfers ==
=== In ===
| No | P | Nat | Name | Age | Moving from | Ends | Transfer fee | Type | Transfer window | Quota | Source |
|---|---|---|---|---|---|---|---|---|---|---|---|
| 7 | RW | (Iran) | Hamidreza Aliasgari | 23 | Rah Ahan Sorinet | 2015 | N/A | Loan return | Summer | | |
| 17 | CF | (Iran) | Younes Shakeri | 23 | Aboumoslem | 2016 | Free | Transfer | Summer | | PNNC |
| 33 | CF | (Iran) | Mohammad Abbaszadeh | 23 | Nassaji | 2016 | €125,000 | Transfer | Summer | | PNNC |
| 22 | RW | (Iran) | Milad Gharibi | 21 | Saipa | 2015 | Free | Transfer | Summer | | PNNC |
| 18 | DM | (Iran) | Mehrdad Kafshgari | 26 | Rah Ahan Sorinet | 2016 | Free | Transfer | Summer | PL | PNNC |
| 12 | LB | (Iran) | Meysam Hosseini | 26 | Naft Tehran | 2015 | Free | Transfer | Summer | PL | Perspolis F.C. |
| 23 | CF | (Iran) | Mehdi Seyed Salehi | 32 | Tractor Sazi | 2015 | Free | Transfer | Summer | PL | Perspolis F.C. |
| 2 | LW | (Iran) | Omid Alishah | 21 | Rah Ahan Sorinet | 2015 | Free | Transfer | Summer | | Perspolis F.C. |
| 11 | SS | (Iran) | Payam Sadeghian | 21 | Zob Ahan | 2015 | Free | Transfer | Summer | | Perspolis F.C. |
| 5 | CM | (Iran) | Ghasem Dehnavi | 32 | Tractor Sazi | 2015 | Free | Transfer | Summer | PL | PNNC |
| 8 | CM | (Montenegro) | Marko Šćepanović | 31 | Mladost Podgorica (Montenegro) | 2014 | Free | Transfer | Summer | | Perspolis F.C. |
| 25 | RB | (Iran) | Farshad Ghasemi | 20 | Moghavemat Tehran U21 | 2016 | Free | Transfer | Summer | | Football Tehran |
| 19 | AM | (Iran) | Milad Kamandani | 19 | Moghavemat Tehran U21 | 2016 | €15,000 | Transfer | Summer | | Football Tehran |
| 88 | GK | (Iran) | Alireza Haghighi | 25 | Rubin Kazan (Russia) | 2014 | Free | Loan | Summer | FA | Perspolis F.C. |
| 99 | RW | (Iran) | Mohammadreza Khalatbari | 29 | Ajman (United Arab Emirates) | 2015 | €610,000 | Transfer | Summer | FA | Perspolis F.C. |
| 15 | CB | (Iran) | Hossein Kanaani | 19 | Beira-Mar (Portugal) | 2014 | N/A | Loan return | Winter | | |
| 77 | AM | (Iran) | Mohsen Mosalman | 22 | Zob Ahan | 2014 | Swap for Milad Gharibi | Loan | Winter | | Perspolis F.C. |
| 64 | CF | (Iran) | Farzad Hatami | 27 | Foolad | 2014 | Free | Transfer | Winter | | Fars |

=== Out ===
| No | P | Nat | Name | Age | Moving to | Transfer fee | Type | Transfer window | Source |
|---|---|---|---|---|---|---|---|---|---|
| 2 | RM | (Iran) | Mehdi Mahdavikia | 35 | Retired | | | Summer | the-AFC |
| 8 | AM | (Iran) | Ali Karimi | 34 | Tractor Sazi | Free | Transfer | Summer | ISNA |
| 39 | CM | (Iran) | Adel Kolahkaj | 28 | Esteghlal Khuzestan | Free | Transfer | Summer | IRNA |
| 18 | DM | (Iran) | Meysam Naghizadeh | 26 | Gostaresh Foolad | Free | Transfer | Summer | Goal |
| 19 | LB | (Iran) | Saeid Ghadami | 21 | Damash | Free | Transfer | Summer | Damash S.C. |
| 27 | LW | (Iran) | Rouhollah Seifollahi | 23 | Damash | Free | Transfer | Summer | Damash S.C. |
| 32 | LW | (Iran) | Farshad Ahmadzadeh | 21 | Tractor Sazi | Free | Loan | Summer | Mehr |
| 28 | GK | (Iran) | Masoud Dastani | 21 | Free agent | Free | Contract termination | Summer | |
| 11 | CF | (Iran) | Mohammad Ghazi | 28 | Esteghlal | Free | Transfer | Summer | Fars |
| 23 | LB | (Iran) | Amirhossein Feshangchi | 26 | Malavan | Free | Transfer | Summer | Fars |
| 22 | LM | (Iran) | Mehrzad Madanchi | 32 | Fajr Sepasi | Free | Transfer | Summer | Mehr |
| 17 | RM | (North Macedonia) | Vlatko Grozdanoski | 30 | FK Vardar (North Macedonia) | Free | Transfer | Summer | |
| 29 | LM | (Serbia) | Marko Perović | 29 | OFK Beograd (Serbia) | Free | Transfer | Summer | |
| 9 | CF | (Iran) | Karim Ansarifard | 23 | Tractor Sazi | Free | Loan | Summer | Fars |
| 15 | CB | (Iran) | Roozbeh Cheshmi | 20 | Saba Qom | Free | Transfer | Summer | Saba Qom F.C. |
| 31 | AM | (Iran) | Afshin Esmaeilzadeh | 21 | Beira-Mar (Portugal) | Free | Loan | Winter | PNNC |
| 15 | CB | (Iran) | Hossein Kanaani | 19 | Beira-Mar (Portugal) | Free | Loan | Winter | PNNC |
| 10 | RW | (Iran) | Gholamreza Rezaei | 29 | Foolad | Free | Transfer | Winter | Goal |
| 3 | CB | (Iran) | Mohammadreza Khanzadeh | 22 | Zob Ahan | Free | Loan | Winter | Perspolis F.C. |
| 22 | RW | (Iran) | Milad Gharibi | 21 | Zob Ahan | Swap for Mohsen Mosalman | Loan | Winter | Perspolis F.C. |
| 24 | ST | (Iran) | Hadi Norouzi | 28 | Naft Tehran | undisclosed | Loan | Winter | Fars |
| 17 | CF | (Iran) | Younes Shakeri | 23 | Padideh | undisclosed | Loan | Winter | Fars |
| 88 | GK | (Iran) | Alireza Haghighi | 25 | Rubin Kazan (Russia) | N/A | Loan return | Winter | Perspolis F.C. |
| 8 | CM | (Montenegro) | Marko Šćepanović | 31 | Free agent | Free | Contract termination | Winter | |

== Competition record ==
| Competition | Record | | | | | | | |
| Competition | G | W | D | L | GF | GA | GD | Win % |
|---|---|---|---|---|---|---|---|---|
| Iran Pro League | 30 | 16 | 8 | 6 | 34 | 15 | +19 | 53.33 |
| Hazfi Cup | 3 | 2 | 0 | 1 | 8 | 2 | +6 | 66.67 |
| Total | 33 | 18 | 8 | 7 | 43 | 17 | +26 | 54.55 |

=== Iran Pro League ===
==== Standings ====
| Pos | Team | Pld | W | D | L | GF | GA | GD | Pts | Qualification or relegation |
|---|---|---|---|---|---|---|---|---|---|---|
| 1 | Foolad (C) | 30 | 16 | 9 | 5 | 36 | 24 | +12 | 57 | Qualification for the 2015 AFC Champions League group stage |
| 2 | Persepolis | 30 | 16 | 8 | 6 | 34 | 15 | +19 | 55 (Note: Esteghlal, Malavan, Damash, Persepolis and Tractor Sazi were deducted 1 point due to poor fan behavior in their home matches.) | Qualification for the 2015 AFC Champions League group stage |
| 3 | Naft Tehran | 30 | 15 | 9 | 6 | 39 | 23 | +16 | 54 | Qualification for the 2015 AFC Champions League qualifying play-off |
| 4 | Sepahan | 30 | 14 | 12 | 4 | 36 | 20 | +16 | 54 | |
| 5 | Esteghlal | 30 | 15 | 9 | 6 | 34 | 25 | +9 | 53 | |

Updated to match(es) played on 11 April 2014. Source: FIFA.com
Rules for classification: 1) points; 2) goal difference; 3) number of goals scored.
(C) Champions

== Competitions ==
=== Overview ===
| Competition | Started round | Current position / round | Final position / round | First match | Last match |
|---|---|---|---|---|---|
| 2013–14 Iran Pro League | — | — | 2nd | 24 July 2013 | |
| 2013–14 Hazfi Cup | Round of 32 | Quarter-finals | Quarter-finals | 23 October 2013 | 26 January 2014 |

Source: Competitions

==== Results summary ====
| Overall | | | | | | | | Home | | | | | | Away | | | | | |
| Pld | W | D | L | GF | GA | GD | Pts | W | D | L | GF | GA | GD | W | D | L | GF | GA | GD |
|---|---|---|---|---|---|---|---|---|---|---|---|---|---|---|---|---|---|---|---|
| 30 | 16 | 8 | 6 | 34 | 14 | +20 | 56 | 11 | 4 | 0 | 21 | 5 | +16 | 5 | 4 | 6 | 13 | 9 | +4 |

Last updated: 11 April 2014.
Source: Ipl Stats

==== Results by round ====
| Round | 1 | 2 | 3 | 4 | 5 | 6 | 7 | 8 | 9 | 10 | 11 | 12 | 13 | 14 | 15 | 16 | 17 | 18 | 19 | 20 | 21 | 22 | 23 | 24 | 25 | 26 | 27 | 28 | 29 | 30 |
|---|---|---|---|---|---|---|---|---|---|---|---|---|---|---|---|---|---|---|---|---|---|---|---|---|---|---|---|---|---|---|
| Ground | H | A | H | A | H | A | H | A | H | A | H | A | H | A | H | A | H | A | H | A | H | A | H | A | H | A | H | A | H | A |
| Result | W | D | W | L | W | L | W | D | W | L | W | D | W | W | D | L | W | W | W | W | D | L | D | L | W | D | W | W | D | W |
| Position | 4 | 5 | 2 | 5 | 4 | 5 | 3 | 5 | 2 | 4 | 3 | 5 | 2 | 1 | 1 | 5 | 3 | 1 | 1 | 1 | 2 | 3 | 3 | 5 | 3 | 5 | 3 | 2 | 4 | 2 |

Updated to match(es) played on 27 March 2014. Source: "Ipl".
A = Away; H = Home; W = Win; D = Draw; L = Loss

==== Matches ====
Win Draw Loss Postponed

| Date Round | Home | Score | Away | Location |

| 24 July 2013 1 | Persepolis | 1 – 0 | Tractor Sazi | Tehran |
| 22:15 DST+04:30 | R. Haghighi (penalty missed) 11' (yellow card) 45+1'; M. Seyed Salehi 80' | Summary; Live TV: IRIB TV3 / Jame Jam 2 | M. Ebrahimi (yellow card) 35'; M. Assadi (red card) 49' | Stadium: Azadi Stadium; Attendance: 60,000; Referee: Mohsen Ghahremani |

| 2 August 2013 2 | Zob Ahan | 0 – 0 | Persepolis | Fuladshahr |
| 22:15 DST+04:30 | | Summary; Live TV: IRIB TV3 / Jame Jam 2 | | Stadium: Foolad Shahr Stadium; Attendance: 10,000; Referee: Saeid Mozaffarizadeh |

| 7 August 2013 3 | Persepolis | 2 – 0 | Mes Kerman | Tehran |
| 22:15 DST+04:30 | H. Mahini (yellow card) 17'; P. Sadeghian 66'; Gh. Dehnavi 75' | Summary; Live TV: IRIB TV3 / Jame Jam 2 | M. Shojaei (yellow card) 43' | Stadium: Azadi Stadium; Attendance: 30,000; Referee: Hossein Zargar |

| 11 August 2013 4 | Saipa | 1 – 0 | Persepolis | Karaj |
| 20:30 DST+04:30 | R. Shahalidoost 30' (yellow card) 38'; M. Ghobakhlou (yellow card) 78'; M. Sadeghi (yellow card) 81' | Summary; Live TV: IRIB TV3 / Jame Jam 2 | | Stadium: Enghelab Stadium; Attendance: 9,000; Referee: Mehdi Seyed-Ali |

| 16 August 2013 5 | Persepolis | 1 – 0 | Malavan | Tehran |
| 19:30 DST+04:30 | M. Kafshgari (red card) 33'; O. Alishah 73' (yellow card) 77'; M. Seyed Salehi (yellow card) 86' | Summary; Live TV: IRIB TV3 / Jame Jam 2 | M. Zare (yellow card) 24'; S. Yousefzadeh (yellow card) 72' | Stadium: Azadi Stadium; Attendance: 25,000; Referee: Alireza Faghani |

| 23 August 2013 6 | Naft Tehran | 1 – 0 | Persepolis | Tehran |
| 19:10 DST+04:30 | V. Hamdinejad (yellow card) 17'; A. Ghorbani 90+1' | Summary; Live TV: IRIB TV3 / Jame Jam 2 | M. Hosseini (yellow card) 66'; O. Alishah (yellow card) 84' | Stadium: Takhti Stadium; Attendance: 15,000; Referee: Yadollah Jahanbazi; Man of the Match: Reza Norouzi |

| 30 August 2013 7 | Persepolis | 3 – 1 | Foolad | Tehran |
| 20:00 DST+04:30 | F. Hatami 5' (o.g.); J. Hosseini 12'; M. Bengar (yellow card) 50'; O. Alishah (yellow card) 30' (yellow-red card) 77'; M. Seyed Salehi 69' | Summary; Live TV: IRIB TV3 / Jame Jam 2 | O. Khaledi (yellow card) 90'; E. Sharifat 90+4' | Stadium: Azadi Stadium; Attendance: 30,000; Referee: Touraj Haghverdi; Man of the Match: Jalal Hosseini |

| 6 September 2013 8 | Esteghlal | 0 – 0 | Persepolis | Tehran |
| 18:50 DST+04:30 | M. Nazari (yellow card) 30'; P. Montazeri (yellow card) 76'; M. Ghazi (yellow card) 90+2' | Summary; Live TV: IRIB TV3 / Jame Jam 2 | M. Bengar (yellow card) 30'; M. Nouri (yellow card) 65'; Gh. Dehnavi (yellow card) 73'; R. Haghighi (yellow card) 79'; P. Sadeghian (yellow card) 87'; M. Hosseini (yellow card) 90' | Stadium: Azadi Stadium; Attendance: 100,000; Referee: Alireza Faghani; Man of the Match: Payam Sadeghian |

| 13 September 2013 9 | Persepolis | 1 – 0 | Gostaresh Foolad | Tehran |
| 20:00 DST+04:30 | M. Khalatbari 45' (pen.) (yellow card) 81'; R. Haghighi (yellow card) 90' | Summary; Live TV: IRIB TV3 / Jame Jam 2 | B. Dadashvand (yellow card) 8'; S. Mehdipour (yellow card) 33'; I. Mousavi (yellow card) 39'; A. Amir Kamdar (yellow card) 41'; Kh. Shafiei (yellow card) 86' | Stadium: Azadi Stadium; Attendance: 25,000; Referee: Mohsen Torki; Man of the Match: Omid Alishah |

| 20 September 2013 10 | Sepahan | 2 – 0 | Persepolis | Fooladshahr |
| 20:00 DST+04:30 | H. Aghily 6' (pen.); O. Ebrahimi (yellow card) 23'; M. Gholami (yellow card) 76'; A. Jahan Alian 90+4' | Summary; Live TV: IRIB TV3 / Jame Jam 2 | M. Hosseini (red card) 4' | Stadium: Foolad Shahr Stadium; Attendance: 12,000; Referee: Mohsen Ghahremani; Man of the Match: Hadi Aghily |
Note: Meysam Hosseini's straight red card switched to yellow card by FFIRI disciplinarian committee.

| 26 September 2013 11 | Persepolis | 1 – 0 | Fajr Sepasi | Tehran |
| 17:20 DST+03:30 | M. Nouri (yellow card) 73'; M. Seyed Salehi (yellow card) 76' (goal) 81'; H. Mahini (yellow card) 83' | Summary; Live TV: IRIB TV3 / Jame Jam 2 | M. Heidari (yellow card) 17'; J. Ali Mohammadi (yellow card) 69' | Stadium: Azadi Stadium; Attendance: 25,000; Referee: Mohammad Reza Akbarian; Man of the Match: Mehdi Seyed Salehi |

| 4 October 2013 12 | Saba Qom | 1 – 1 | Persepolis | Qom |
| 18:15 DST+03:30 | M. Kashi 41'; M. Bayat (yellow card) 71' | Summary; Live TV: IRIB TV3 / Jame Jam 2 | P. Sadeghian (yellow card) 23'; M. Bengar (yellow card) 83'; M. Seyed Salehi 90' | Stadium: Yadegar-e Emam Stadium; Attendance: 15,000; Referee: Touraj Haghverdi; Man of the Match: Mehdi Seyed Salehi |

| 18 October 2013 13 | Persepolis | 2 – 0 | Damash | Tehran |
| 18:00 DST+03:30 | M. Kafshgari (yellow card) 33' (yellow-red card) 75'; A. Motevaselzadeh 45+1' (o.g.); H. Aliasgari 83' | Summary; Live TV: IRIB TV3 / Jame Jam 2 | M. Mokhtari (yellow card) 28' (yellow-red card) 82'; R. Seifollahi (yellow card) 73'; M. Abshak (yellow card) 90+3' | Stadium: Azadi Stadium; Attendance: 16,000; Referee: Shahin Haji Babaei; Man of the Match: Hamidreza Aliasgari |

| 27 October 2013 14 | Rah Ahan Sorinet | 0 – 1 | Persepolis | Tehran |
| 15:30 DST+03:30 | | Summary; Live TV: IRIB TV3 / Jame Jam 2 | M. Khalatbari 46'; M. Nouri (yellow card) 73' | Stadium: Takhti Stadium; Attendance: 4,000; Referee: Alborz Hajipour; Man of the Match: Mohammad Reza Khalatbari |
Note: Ali Daei was suspended for this match. Karim Bagheri managed Persepolis in his place.

| 6 November 2013 15 | Persepolis | 0 – 0 | Esteghlal Khuzestan | Tehran |
| 15:15 DST+03:30 | P. Sadeghian (yellow card) 50'; J. Hosseini (yellow card) 67'; H. Aliasgari (yellow card) 75' | Summary; Live TV: IRIB TV3 / Jame Jam 2 | I. Traoré (yellow card) 47'; E. Salehi (yellow card) 59'; S. Bakhtiarizadeh (yellow card) 74'; M. Kheiri (yellow card) 81' | Stadium: Azadi Stadium; Attendance: 10,000; Referee: Mohammadreza Akbarian; Man of the Match: Parviz Karimi |

| 28 November 2013 16 | Tractor Sazi | 1 – 0 | Persepolis | Tabriz |
| 15:00 DST+03:30 | K. Ansarifard (yellow card) 8' (goal) 40'; F. Ahmadzadeh (yellow card) 36'; M. Kiani (yellow card) 90+2'; H. Lak (yellow card) 90+4' | Summary; Live TV: IRIB TV3 / Jame Jam 2 | R. Haghighi (yellow card) 36'; H. Aliasgari (yellow card) 90' | Stadium: Yadegar-e Emam Stadium; Attendance: 45,000; Referee: Yadollah Jahanbazi; Man of the Match: Farshid Talebi |

| 6 December 2013 17 | Persepolis | 2 – 1 | Zob Ahan | Tehran |
| 16:20 DST+03:30 | M. Khalatbari 20', 57'; P. Sadeghian (yellow card) 22'; H. Aliasgari (yellow card) 61'; R. Haghighi (yellow card) 80' | Summary; Live TV: IRIB TV3 / Jame Jam 2 | Gh. Haddadifar 49'; M. Khanzadeh (yellow card) 59'; M. Bayatinia (yellow card) 80'; M. Rajabzadeh (yellow card) 84' | Stadium: Azadi Stadium; Attendance: 8,000; Referee: Jamshid Danesh Mehr; Man of the Match: Mohammadreza Khalatbari |

| 13 December 2013 18 | Mes Kerman | 0 – 6 | Persepolis | Kerman |
| 15:00 DST+03:30 | K. Rahmati (yellow card) 19'; K. Eslami (yellow card) 90' | Summary; Live TV: IRIB TV3 / Jame Jam 2 | M. Mosalman 4'; M. Kafshgari 16'; M. Khalatbari 47' (pen.); M. Seyed Salehi 68'; P. Sadeghian 73'; F. Hatami 90+5' | Stadium: Shahid Bahonar Stadium; Attendance: 20,000; Referee: Ahmad Salehi; Man of the Match: Payam Sadeghian |
Note: Mes Kerman head coach Parviz Mazloumi was expelled in the 51st minute for protesting.

| 19 December 2013 19 | Persepolis | 1 – 0 | Saipa | Tehran |
| 16:20 DST+03:30 | M. Khalatbari (yellow card) 34'; M. Mosalman 73' | Summary; Live TV: IRIB TV3 / Jame Jam 2 | | Stadium: Azadi Stadium; Attendance: 7,000; Referee: Hossein Zargar; Man of the Match: Payam Sadeghian |

| 24 December 2013 20 | Malavan | 0 – 1 | Persepolis | Bandar-e Anzali |
| 14:30 DST+03:30 | J. Rafkhaei (yellow card) 38'; M. Zare (yellow card) 38' | Summary; Live TV: IRIB TV3 / Jame Jam 2 | M. Khalatbari 9'; M. Seyed Salehi (yellow card) 30'; M. Bengar (yellow card) 45+1' | Stadium: Takhti Stadium; Attendance: 10,000; Referee: Mohammadreza Akbarian; Man of the Match: Mohammadreza Khalatbari |

| 3 January 2014 21 | Persepolis | 0 – 0 | Naft Tehran | Tehran |
| 15:00 DST+03:30 | M. Khalatbari (yellow card) 23'; H. Aliasgari (yellow card) 42'; R. Haghighi (yellow card) 75' | Summary; Live TV: IRIB TV3 / Jame Jam 2 | A. Ezzati (yellow card) 39'; M. Pouraliganji (yellow card) 58' | Stadium: Azadi Stadium; Attendance: 10,000; Referee: Alireza Faghani; Man of the Match: Alireza Beiranvand |

| 11 January 2014 22 | Foolad | 2 – 1 | Persepolis | Ahwaz |
| 14:30 DST+03:30 | E. Sharifat 34'; A. Afshin 89' (yellow card) 89' | Summary; Live TV: IRIB TV3 / Jame Jam 2 | M. Seyed Salehi 24' (yellow card) 90+1'; M. Nouri (yellow card) 45'; J. Hosseini (yellow card) 51'; Gh. Dehnavi (yellow card) 65' | Stadium: Ghadir Stadium; Attendance: 20,000; Referee: Yadollah Jahanbazi; Man of the Match: Esmaeil Sharifat |

| 17 January 2014 23 | Persepolis | 0 – 0 | Esteghlal | Tehran |
| 14:30 DST+03:30 | P. Sadeghian (yellow card) 8'; M. Nouri (yellow card) 36'; H. Aliasgari (yellow card) 77' | Summary; Live TV: IRIB TV3 / Jame Jam 2 | P. Nouri (yellow card) 8'; H. Omranzadeh (yellow card) 51'; H. Beikzadeh (yellow card) 69'; M. Gholamnejad (yellow card) 90+2' | Stadium: Azadi Stadium; Attendance: 95,000; Referee: Saeid Mozaffarizadeh; Man of the Match: Mohammad Nouri |

| 21 January 2014 24 | Gostaresh Foolad | 1 – 0 | Persepolis | Tabriz |
| 14:30 DST+03:30 | M. Bayrami 56'; Kh. Shafiei (yellow card) 74'; M. Mahfouzi (yellow card) 82'; M. Forouzan (yellow card) 84' | Summary; Live TV: IRIB TV3 / Jame Jam 2 | M. Nouri (yellow card) 78' | Stadium: Yadegar-e Emam Stadium; Attendance: 1,000; Referee: Mohammadreza Akbarian |

| 31 January 2014 25 | Persepolis | 2 – 0 | Sepahan | Tehran |
| 17:00 DST+03:30 | M. Abbaszadeh 11'; H. Aliasgari 17'; Gh. Dehnavi (yellow card) 23'; M. Bengar (yellow card) 61'; M. Khalatbari (yellow card) 73'; M. Hosseini (yellow card) 73' | Summary; Live TV: IRIB TV3 / Jame Jam 2 | M. Sharifi (red card); M. Gholami (yellow card) 65'; Sh. Khalilzadeh (yellow card) 73'; O. Ebrahimi (yellow card) 90' | Stadium: Azadi Stadium; Attendance: 20,000; Referee: Alireza Faghani; Man of the Match: Mohsen Mosalman |

| 9 February 2014 26 | Fajr Sepasi | 1 – 1 | Persepolis | Shiraz |
| 14:30 DST+03:30 | M. Khodashenas (yellow card) 42'; J. Alimohammadi 65' (yellow card) 90+4'; S. Kouhnavard (yellow card) 83'; M. Karimian (yellow card) 88' | Summary; Live TV: IRIB TV3 / Jame Jam 2 | M. Heidari 50' (o.g.); M. Mosalman (yellow card) 53'; J. Hosseini (yellow card) 67'; M. Nouri (yellow card) 90+4' | Stadium: Hafezieh Stadium; Attendance: 20,000; Referee: Alborz Hajipour; Man of the Match: Mehdi Karimian |

| 21 February 2014 27 | Persepolis | 3 – 1 | Saba Qom | Tehran |
| 16:00 DST+03:30 | M. Abbaszadeh 11'; A. Nourmohammadi (yellow card) 19' (goal) 33'; M. Nouri (yellow card) 64' (On bench); H. Aliasgari (yellow card) 76'; Gh. Dehnavi (yellow card) 77'; M. Pouladi (yellow card) 79'; P. Sadeghian 88' | Summary; Live TV: IRIB TV3 / Jame Jam 2 | M. Aramtab (yellow card) 81'; R. Enayati 90+3' | Stadium: Azadi Stadium; Attendance: 27,000; Referee: Alireza Faghani; Man of the Match: Payam Sadeghian |

| 27 March 2014 28 | Damash | 0 – 1 | Persepolis | Rasht |
| 17:30 DST+03:30 | M. Mokhtari (yellow card) 40'; A. Hajizadeh (yellow card) 65'; R. Soroushnia (yellow card) 68'; R. Seifollahi (yellow card) 83' | Summary; Live TV: Varzesh | M. Abbaszadeh 30'; M. Pouladi (yellow card) 66' | Stadium: Azodi Stadium; Attendance: 20,000; Referee: Yadollah Jahanbazi; Man of the Match: Mohsen Bengar |

| 5 April 2014 29 | Persepolis | 2 – 2 | Rah Ahan Sorinet | Tehran |
| 17:30 DST+03:30 | M. Abbaszadeh 18'; A. Nourmohammadi (yellow card) 49'; O. Alishah 62'; F. Hatami (yellow card) 90+4' | Summary; Live TV: Varzesh | A. Alipour 16'; D. Wirikom (yellow card) 17'; I. Shirazi (yellow card) 25'; A. Azimi 88' | Stadium: Azadi Stadium; Attendance: 20,000; Referee: Touraj Haghverdi |

| 10 April 2014 30 | Esteghlal Khuzestan | 0 – 1 | Persepolis | Ahwaz |
| 19:30 DST+03:30 | M. Coulibaly (yellow card); I. Traoré (yellow card) 28'; H. Kaabi (yellow card) 30' | Summary; Live TV: IRIB TV2 | P. Sadeghian (yellow card) 27'; M. Abbaszadeh 31' (pen.); O. Alishah (yellow card) 45+2'; M. Kafshgari (yellow card) 46' | Stadium: Ghadir Stadium; Attendance: 20,000; Referee: Yadollah Jahanbazi |

==== Score overview ====
Win Draw Loss

| Opposition | Home score | Away score | Aggregate score |
|---|---|---|---|
| Esteghlal | 0–0 | 0–0 | 0–0 |
| Esteghlal Khuzestan | 0–0 | 0–1 | 1–0 |
| Damash | 2–0 | 0–1 | 3–0 |
| Fajr Sepasi | 1–0 | 1–1 | 2–1 |
| Foolad | 3–1 | 2–1 | 4–3 |
| Gostaresh Foulad | 1–0 | 1–0 | 1–1 |
| Malavan | 1–0 | 0–1 | 2–0 |
| Mes Kerman | 2–0 | 0–6 | 8–0 |
| Naft Tehran | 0–0 | 1–0 | 0–1 |
| Rah Ahan | 2–2 | 0–1 | 3–2 |
| Saba | 3–1 | 1–1 | 4–2 |
| Saipa | 1–0 | 1–0 | 1–1 |
| Sepahan | 2–0 | 2–0 | 2–2 |
| Tractor | 1–0 | 1–0 | 1–1 |
| Zob Ahan | 2–1 | 0–0 | 2–1 |

=== Hazfi Cup ===
Win Draw Loss Postponed

| Date Round | Home | Score | Away | Location |

| 23 October 2013 Round of 32 | Persepolis | 5 – 1 (a.e.t.) | Padideh | Tehran |
| 16:45 DST+03:30 | M. Nourmohammadi 48' (o.g.); A. Nourmohammadi 93'; M. Bengar (yellow card) 95'; Y. Shakeri 111' (yellow card) 83'; M. Gharibi 114'; H. Norouzi 118' | Summary; Live TV: IRIB TV3 / Jame Jam 2 | H. Badamaki (yellow card) 57' (yellow-red card) 90'; A. Shokouh Magham (yellow card) 66' (yellow-red card) 115'; B. Tahmasebi 86' | Stadium: Azadi Stadium; Attendance: 1,000; Referee: Mo'oud Bonyadifar; Man of the Match: Younes Shakeri |
Note: Ali Daei was suspended for this match. Karim Bagheri managed Persepolis in his place.

| 1 November 2013 Round of 16 | Persepolis | 2 – 0 | Alvand Hamedan | Tehran |
| 16:40 DST+03:30 | R. Haghighi 13' (yellow card) 42'; O. Alishah 68' | Summary; Live TV: IRIB TV3 / Jame Jam 2 | Sh. Kosari (yellow card) 23'; J. Rahimi (yellow card) 37' | Stadium: Azadi Stadium; Attendance: 6,000; Referee: Jamshid Daneshmehr; Man of the Match: Reza Haghighi |
Note: Reza Talaeimanesh was suspended for this match. Reza Beygomjani managed Alvand Hamedam in his place.

| 26 January 2014 Quarter-finals | Foolad | 1 – 1 (a.e.t.) (3 – 0 p) | Persepolis | Ahvaz |
| 16:45 DST+03:30 | A. Kalantari (yellow card) 3'; B. Rahmani 57'; M. Badrlou (yellow card) 84'; A. Karami (yellow card) 93'; Gh. Rezaei (yellow card) 99' | [ Summary] Live TV: IRIB TV3 / Jame Jam 2 | M. Abbaszadeh 5'; A. Nourmohammadi (yellow card) 6'; J. Hosseini (yellow card) 34'; M. Mosalman (yellow card) 62'; Gh. Dehnavi (yellow card) 84'; M. Nouri (yellow card) 82' | Stadium: Ghadir Stadium; Attendance: 40,000; Referee: Touraj Haghverdi |
| | Penalties |
| | (penalty scored) M. Badrlou; (penalty scored) L. Chaves; (penalty scored) L. Padovani | | (penalty missed) Gh. Dehnavi; (penalty missed) H. Mahini; (penalty missed) M. Khalatbari |

=== Friendly Matches ===
==== Pre-season ====
Win Draw Loss Postponed

| Date Round | Home | Score | Away | Location |

| 6 June 2013 | Arta Sabalan | 0 – 1 | Persepolis | Ardabil |
| 17:40 DST+04:30 | | | H. Norouzi 80' | Stadium: Takhti Stadium; Attendance: 2,500 |

| 9 June 2013 | Ardabil AU XI | 1 – 2 | Persepolis | Ardabil |
| 18:15 DST+04:30 | M. Karimzadeh 75' (yellow card) 85' (yellow-red card) | | M. Abbaszadeh 57', 68'; M. Bengar (red card) 76' | Stadium: Takhti Stadium; Attendance: 5,000; Referee: Siamak Sharafi |

| 15 June 2013 | Persepolis | 5 – 1 | Persepolis U21 | Tehran |
| 17:30 DST+04:30 | R. Haghighi 5' (pen.); M. Abbaszadeh 10'; H. Norouzi 35'; Y. Shakeri 50'; M. Bengar 60' | | H. Tamini 81' | Stadium: Derafshifar Stadium; Attendance: 200; Referee: Ali Hashemi |

| 23 June 2013 | Persepolis Qaemshahr | 2 – 2 | Persepolis | Ramsar |
| 17:50 DST+04:30 | H. Shoshtari 25'; N. Rezaei 70' | | M. Abbaszadeh 30'; M. Kafshgari 45+1' | Stadium: Shahid Chamran; Attendance: 300 |

| 26 June 2013 | Sepidrood | 2 – 3 | Persepolis | Abbasabad |
| 17:45 DST+04:30 | Emad Mir Javan 45' (pen.); 87' | | M. Abbaszadeh 60'; M. Seyed Salehi 67'; H. Aliasgari 73' | Attendance: 8,000 |

| 3 July 2013 | Persepolis | 1 – 0 | Tractor Sazi | Tehran |
| 17:45 DST+04:30 | Y. Shakeri 81' | | | Stadium: Derafshifar Stadium; Attendance: 300 |

| 7 July 2013 | Persepolis | 2 – 0 | Esteghlal Khuzestan | Tehran |
| 17:45 DST+04:30 | M. Nouri 55', 65' | | | Stadium: Derafshifar Stadium; Attendance: 500 |

| 11 July 2013 | Persepolis | 1 – 1 | Malavan | Tehran |
| 18:00 DST+04:30 | M. Abbaszadeh 13' | | J. Rafkhaei 18' | Stadium: Derafshifar Stadium; Attendance: 8,000 |

| 14 July 2013 | Persepolis | 1 – 2 | Foolad | Tehran |
| 21:00 DST+04:30 | R. Haghighi (red card) 16'; Gh. Dehnavi 62' (pen.) | | M. Nouri 17' (pen.); E. Sharifat 55'; A. Salimi (red card) 61'; A. Kalantari (yellow card) 90' (yellow-red card) | Stadium: Takhti Stadium; Attendance: 4,000 |

| 17 July 2013 | Saipa | 3 – 0 | Persepolis | Tehran |
| 18:10 DST+04:30 | H. Shiri 21' (pen.), 65'; S. Shahbazzadeh 35'; M. Sabeti (yellow card) | | A. Nourmohammadi (red card) 75'; R. Hagighi (yellow card); M. Khanzadeh (yellow card) | Stadium: Iran Tire Stadium; Attendance: N/A; Referee: Touraj Haghverdi |
Note: Saipa head coach Engin Firat was expelled in second half for protesting.

| 21 July 2013 | Persepolis | 8 – 2 | Persepolis U21 | Tehran |
| 19:00 DST+04:30 | M. Kafshgari; H. Kanaani; M. Nouri | | | Stadium: Derafshifar Stadium |
Note: Match played in three 30-minutes times

==== During season ====
| 25 July 2013 | Persepolis | 3 – 0 | Samsung Kerman | Tehran |
| 18:00 DST+04:30 | M. Kafshgari 45'; P. Popara 60'; M. Khanzadeh | | | Stadium: Derafshifar Stadium |

| 3 August 2013 | Persepolis | 1 – 1 | Esteghlal Ahvaz | Tehran |
| 18:00 DST+04:30 | M. Gharibi | | | Stadium: Derafshifar Stadium |

| 12 August 2013 | Persepolis | 1 – 2 | Shahrdari Ardabil | Tehran |
| 18:10 DST+04:30 | M. Kamandani 90+1' | | 87'; 88' | Stadium: Derafshifar Stadium; Attendance: 40 |

| 24 August 2013 | Persepolis | 2 – 1 | Siah Jamegan Khorasan | Tehran |
| 17:30 DST+04:30 | H. Norouzi 17'; M. Abbaszadeh 25' | | 39' | Stadium: Derafshifar Stadium; Attendance: 50 |

| 31 August 2013 | Persepolis | 3 – 0 | Shahrdari Yasuj | Tehran |
| 17:30 DST+04:30 | M. Abbaszadeh 23', 82'; A. Abedzadeh 85' | | | Stadium: Derafshifar Stadium |

| 7 September 2013 | Persepolis | 1 – 1 | Foolad Yazd | Tehran |
| 17:30 DST+04:30 | M. Abbaszadeh 90'; H. Mahini (yellow card) 65' | | M. Mohammadzadeh 65' | Stadium: Derafshifar Stadium; Attendance: 50; Referee: Saeed Shams |

| 14 September 2013 | Persepolis | 3 – 3 | PAS Hamedan | Tehran |
| 17:40 DST+04:30 | Y. Shakeri 10'; M. Abbaszadeh 53', 65' | | A. Nourmohammadi 45' (o.g.); F. Shahrouei 60'; L. Hamidi 73' | Stadium: Derafshifar Stadium; Attendance: 50; Referee: Saeed Shams |

| 21 September 2013 | Persepolis | 5 – 1 | Aluminium Minab | Tehran |
| 17:00 DST+04:30 | Gh. Rezaei 15', 77', 79'; M. Abbaszadeh 27', 55' | | 7' | Stadium: Derafshifar Stadium; Attendance: 20 |

| 28 September 2013 | Persepolis | 11 – 1 | Hasan Abad Ghom | Tehran |
| 16:10 IRST+03:30 | H. Norouzi 3', 90'; Y. Shakeri 6', 17', 86'; Gh. Rezaei 8'; M. Gharibi 12'; M. Abbaszadeh 46', 75', 80', 83' | | | Stadium: Derafshifar Stadium; Attendance: 20 |

| 5 October 2013 | Persepolis | 10 – 0 | Payam Gostar Ray | Tehran |
| 16:40 IRST+03:30 | Y. Shakeri 13', 30', 67', 86'; H. Norouzi 35', 69'; H. Aliasgari 50'; Gh. Dehnavi 72' (pen.); M. Gharibi; R. Haghighi | | | Stadium: Derafshifar Stadium; Attendance: 15 |

| 10 October 2013 | Persepolis | 2 – 3 | Zob Ahan Isfahan | Tehran |
| 16:15 IRST+03:30 | H. Norouzi 18'; M. Abbaszadeh 86'; M. Kafshgari (yellow card) 20'; M. Bengar (yellow card) 40'; M. Bengar (yellow card) 90' (red card) | | Gh. Haddadifar 13'; R. Arab 43'; E. Pahlevan 80'; R. Arab (yellow card) 35' | Stadium: Derafshifar Stadium; Attendance: 50 |

| 20 November 2013 | Persepolis | 3 – 1 | Rah Ahan Sorinet | Tehran |
| 15:00 IRST+03:30 | M. Elhaei 13'; M. Abbaszadeh 31', 36'; M. Bengar (yellow card); H. Aliasgari (yellow card); Gh. Dehnavi (yellow card) | | A. Manouchehri 45'; H. Pashaei (yellow card) | Stadium: Derafshifar Stadium; Attendance: 50 |

| 28 November 2013 | Persepolis XI | 1 – 3 | (Italy) A.C. Milan XI | Tehran |
| 15:00 IRST+03:30 | A. Emamifar 26'; M. Panjali (yellow card) 29' | | D. Massaro 1'; Ch. Lantignotti 50'; S. Eranio 66' | Stadium: Azadi Stadium; Attendance: 60,000; Referee: Masoud Moradi |
Note: Match played in two 40-minutes times

| 30 November 2013 | Persepolis | 3 – 1 | Esteghlal B | Tehran |
| 15:00 IRST+03:30 | M. Khalatbari 50'; P. Sadeghian 70'; F. Hatami 82' | | 75' | Stadium: Shahid Beheshti University grand Attendance: 100 |

| 7 December 2013 | Persepolis | 1 – 0 | Oghab | Tehran |
| 10:00 IRST+03:30 | (o.g.) | | | Stadium: Derafshifar Stadium |

| 14 December 2013 | Persepolis | 3 – 0 | Iran U19 | Tehran |
| 15:00 IRST+03:30 | Gh. Dehnavi 75' (pen.); M. Moghtadaei 83' (o.g.); H. Kanaani 90' (yellow card) 30' | | | Stadium: Derafshifar Stadium; Attendance: 70 |

| 20 December 2013 | Persepolis | 4 – 1 | Niroye Zamini | Tehran |
| 11:00 IRST+03:30 | M. Kamandani; M. Abbaszadeh; Gh. Dehnavi | | | Stadium: Shahid Beheshti University grand Attendance: 20 |

| 16 February 2014 | Paykan | 3 – 2 | Persepolis | Paykan Shahr |
| 15:30 IRST+03:30 | I. Razaghirad 8'; K. Vahdani 37'; M. Kermani Moghadam (yellow card) 42'; A. Amiri 70'; A. Torkashvand (red card) 84' | | M. Abbaszadeh 26', 83'; Gh. Dehnavi (yellow card) 42' (yellow card) (yellow-red card); M. Bengar (yellow card) 75' (yellow card) (yellow-red card) | Stadium: Paykan Shahr Stadium; Attendance: 300; Referee: Sirous Seyfollahpour |

| 11 March 2014 | Sadra Neka | 0 – 2 | Persepolis | Qaem Shahr |
| 16:30 IRST+03:30 | | | M. Abbaszadeh (yellow card) (goal) 58', 70'; M. Bengar (yellow card); P. Sadeghian (yellow card) | Stadium: Vatani Stadium |

| 14 March 2014 | Nassaji | 1 – 0 | Persepolis | Qaem Shahr |
| 16:30 IRST+03:30 | | | E. Gharavi 65' | Stadium: Vatani Stadium |

| 19 March 2014 | Naft Tehran | 1 – 1 | Persepolis | Tehran |
| 14:00 IRST+03:30 | V. Hamdinejad 62' | | M. Nouri 33' | Stadium: Shahid Dastgerdi Stadium; Attendance: 200; Referee: Touraj Haghverdi |

| 1 April 2014 | Persepolis | 2 – 1 | Saba Qom | Tehran |
| 17:30 IRST+03:30 | M. Mosalman 44'; F. Hatami | | M. Houtan 58' | Stadium: Derafshifar Stadium; Attendance: without attendant |

== Statistics ==
=== Appearances, goals and disciplinary record ===
| | | | | Pro League | | | | | | | Hazfi Cup | | | | | | | Total | | | | | | |
| No | P | N | Name | S | P | | A | Yellow card | Double yellow card | Red card | S | P | | A | Yellow card | Double yellow card | Red card | S | P | | A | Yellow card | Double yellow card | Red card |
|---|---|---|---|---|---|---|---|---|---|---|---|---|---|---|---|---|---|---|---|---|---|---|---|---|
| 1 | GK | (Iran) | **Reza Mohammadi** | | | | | | | | | | | | | | | | | | | | | |
| 2 | LM | (Iran) | **Omid Alishah** | 14 | 17 | 2 | | 3 | 1 | | 2 | 3 | 1 | | | | | 16 | 20 | 3 | | **3** | **1** | |
| 3 | CB | (Iran) | Mohammadreza Khanzadeh^{1} | 3 | 4 | | 1 | | | | | | | | | | | 3 | 4 | | 1 | | | |
| 4 | CB | (Iran) | **Jalal Hosseini** | 27 | 27 | 1 | | 3 | | | 2 | 2 | | | 1 | | | 29 | 29 | 1 | | **4** | | |
| 5 | CM | (Iran) | **Ghasem Dehnavi** | 16 | 18 | 1 | | 4 | | | 2 | 2 | | | 1 | | | 18 | 20 | 1 | | **5** | | |
| 6 | CB | (Iran) | **Mohsen Bengar** | 29 | 29 | | | 5 | | | 2 | 2 | | | 1 | | | 31 | 31 | | | **6** | | |
| 7 | RM | (Iran) | **Hamidreza Aliasgari** | 9 | 17 | 2 | 1 | 6 | | | 1 | 2 | | | | | | 10 | 19 | 2 | 1 | **6** | | |
| 8 | CM | (Montenegro) | Marko Šćepanović^{1} | 1 | 1 | | | | | | | | | | | | | 1 | 1 | | | | | |
| 9 | DM | (Iran) | **Reza Haghighi** | 25 | 26 | | 1 | 6 | | | 2 | 2 | 1 | | 1 | | | 27 | 28 | 1 | 1 | **7** | | |
| 10 | RW | (Iran) | Gholamreza Rezaei^{1} | 5 | 9 | | | | | | | | | | | | | 5 | 9 | | | | | |
| 11 | SS | (Iran) | **Payam Sadeghian** | 23 | 26 | 3 | 8 | 6 | | | 2 | 2 | | | | | | 25 | 28 | 3 | 8 | **6** | | |
| 12 | LB | (Iran) | **Meysam Hosseini** | 23 | 24 | | | 4^{4} | | | 2 | 2 | | | | | | 25 | 26 | | | **4**^{4} | | |
| 13 | RB | (Iran) | **Hossein Mahini** | 24 | 25 | | 1 | 2 | | | 2 | 2 | | 1 | | | | 26 | 27 | | 2 | **2** | | |
| 14 | AM | (Iran) | **Mohammad Nouri** | 15 | 24 | | 1 | 8 | | | 2 | 3 | | 2 | 1 | | | 17 | 27 | | 3 | **9** | | |
| 15 | CB | (Iran) | **Hossein Kanaani** | | | | | | | | | | | | | | | | | | | | | |
| 16 | LB | (Iran) | **Mehrdad Pouladi** | 4 | 4 | | | 2 | | | | 1 | | | | | | 4 | 5 | | | **2** | | |
| 17 | CF | (Iran) | Younes Shakeri^{1} | | 5 | | | | | | 1 | 2 | 1 | | 1 | | | 1 | 7 | 1 | | **1** | | |
| 18 | DM | (Iran) | **Mehrdad Kafshgari** | 13 | 18 | 1 | 2 | 1 | 1 | 1 | 1 | 1 | | | | | | 14 | 19 | 1 | 2 | **1** | **1** | **1** |
| 19 | AM | (Iran) | **Milad Kamandani** | | 2 | | | | | | | | | | | | | | 2 | | | | | |
| 20 | CB | (Iran) | **Alireza Nourmohammadi** | 5 | 7 | 1 | | 2 | | | 3 | 3 | 1 | | 1 | | | 8 | 10 | 2 | | **3** | | |
| 21 | GK | (Iran) | **Amir Abedzadeh** | | | | | | | | | | | | | | | | | | | | | |
| 22 | RW | (Iran) | Milad Gharibi^{1} | 1 | 1 | | | | | | 1 | 2 | 1 | 1 | | | | 2 | 3 | 1 | 1 | | | |
| 23 | CF | (Iran) | **Mehdi Seyed Salehi** | 23 | 26 | 6 | | 4 | | | 1 | 2 | | | | | | 24 | 28 | 6 | | **4** | | |
| 24 | SS | (Iran) | Hadi Norouzi^{1} | 3 | 10 | | | | | | 1 | 1 | 1 | | | | | 4 | 11 | 1 | | | | |
| 25 | RB | (Iran) | **Farshad Ghasemi** | | 1 | | | | | | | | | | | | | | 1 | | | | | |
| 31 | AM | (Iran) | Afshin Esmaeilzadeh^{1} | | | | | | | | | | | | | | | | | | | | | |
| 33 | CF | (Iran) | **Mohammad Abbaszadeh** | 6 | 13 | 5 | | | | | 1 | 2 | 1 | | | | | 7 | 15 | 6 | | | | |
| 40 | GK | (Brazil) | **Nilson Corrêa** | 30 | 30 | | | | | | 1 | 1 | | | | | | 31 | 31 | | | | | |
| 64 | CF | (Iran) | **Farzad Hatami**^{2} | 1 | 9 | 1 | | | 1 | | | | | | | | | 1 | 9 | 1 | | **1** | | |
| 77 | AM | (Iran) | **Mohsen Mosalman**^{2} | 10 | 12 | 2 | 1 | 1 | | | 1 | 1 | | 1 | 1 | | | 11 | 13 | 2 | 2 | **2** | | |
| 88 | GK | (Iran) | Alireza Haghighi^{1} | | | | | | | | 2 | 2 | | | | | | 2 | 2 | | | | | |
| 99 | RW | (Iran) | **Mohammadreza Khalatbari**^{2} | 19 | 21 | 6 | 4 | 4 | | | 1 | 2 | | | | | | 20 | 23 | 6 | 4 | **4** | | |
| Totals | | | | | | 34^{3} | 19 | 59 | 2 | 1 | | | 8^{3} | 5 | 8 | 0 | 0 | | | 42^{3} | 24 | 67 | 2 | 1 |

Updated as of 11 April 2014

^{1} Player left the club during the season.
^{2} Player joined the club during the season.
^{3} Includes four own goals (by Farzad Hatami against Foolad, by Amin Motevaselzadeh against Damash, by Majid Noormohammadi against Padideh & Mohammad Heidari against Fajr Sepasi).
^{4} Red card in a match against Sepahan (fixture X) was switched to yellow card by FFIRI disciplinarian committee.

=== Goalkeeping ===
| | | | League | | | Hazfi Cup | | | Total | | |
| No | N | Name | M | GA | CS | M | GA | CS | M | GA | CS |
|---|---|---|---|---|---|---|---|---|---|---|---|
| 40 | (Brazil) | Nilson | 30 | 15 | 18 | 1 | 1 | 0 | **31** | **16** | **18** |
| 88 | (Iran) | Alireza Haghighi | – | – | – | 2 | 1 | 1 | **2** | **1** | **1** |
| Total | | | 30 | 15 | 18 | 3 | 2 | 1 | 33 | 17 | 19 |

=== Man of the Match & Man of Ethics ===
| No. | Nat | Pos | Name | MOM | MOE |
|---|---|---|---|---|---|
| 2 | (Iran) | LM | Omid Alishah | 1 | 0 |
| 4 | (Iran) | CB | Jalal Hosseini | 1 | 2 |
| 6 | (Iran) | CB | Mohsen Bengar | 1 | 1 |
| 7 | (Iran) | RM | Hamidreza Aliasgari | 1 | 0 |
| 9 | (Iran) | DM | Reza Haghighi | 1 | 1 |
| 11 | (Iran) | SS | Payam Sadeghian | 4 | 0 |
| 14 | (Iran) | AM | Mohammad Nouri | 1 | 0 |
| 17 | (Iran) | CF | Younes Shakeri | 1 | 0 |
| 23 | (Iran) | CF | Mehdi Seyed Salehi | 2 | 0 |
| 40 | (Brazil) | GK | Nilson Correa | 0 | 2 |
| 77 | (Iran) | AM | Mohsen Mosalman | 1 | 0 |
| 99 | (Iran) | RW | Mohammadreza Khalatbari | 3 | 0 |

=== Injuries During The season ===
Players in bold are still out from their injuries.

| No. | Nat | Pos | Name | Date | Injury | Estimated Return Date | Source |
|---|---|---|---|---|---|---|---|
| 16 | (Iran) | LB | Mehrdad Pouladi | 26 March 2013 | Achilles tendon | October 2013 | Perspolisnews.com |
| 7 | (Iran) | RM | Hamidreza Aliasgari | 11 August 2013 | Waist | August 2013 | |
| 9 | (Iran) | DM | Reza Haghighi | 14 August 2013 | Cruciate ligament | August 2013 | Farsnews.com |
| 11 | (Iran) | SS | Payam Sadeghian | 17 August 2013 | Waist | August 2013 | |
| 13 | (Iran) | RB | Hossein Mahini | 23 August 2013 | Groin | September 2013 | |
| 7 | (Iran) | RM | Hamidreza Aliasgari | 4 September 2013 | Hand | September 2013 | |
| 14 | (Iran) | AM | Mohammad Nouri | 6 September 2013 | Groin | September 2013 | |
| 13 | (Iran) | RB | Hossein Mahini | 2 October 2013 | Waist | October 2013 | |
| 2 | (Iran) | LM | Omid Alishah | 28 November 2013 | Cruciate ligament | March 2014 | |
| 18 | (Iran) | MF | Mehrdad Kafshgari | 3 January 2014 | Arm | March 2014 | |

=== Overall statistics ===
| | Total | Home | Away | Neutral |
|---|---|---|---|---|
| Games played | 33 | 17 | 16 | 0 |
| Games won | 18 | 13 | 5 | 0 |
| Games drawn | 8 | 4 | 4 | 0 |
| Games lost | 7 | 0 | 7 | 0 |
| Biggest win | 6-0 | 5-1 | 6-0 | N/A |
| Biggest loss | 2–0 | N/A | 2–0 | N/A |
| Biggest win (League) | 3-1 | 3-1 | 0-1 | N/A |
| Biggest win (Cup) | 5-1 | 5-1 | N/A | N/A |
| Biggest loss (League) | 2–0 | N/A | 2–0 | N/A |
| Biggest loss (Cup) | N/A | N/A | N/A | N/A |
| Clean sheets | 19 | 13 | 6 | 0 |
| Goals scored | 42 | 28 | 14 | 0 |
| Goals conceded | 17 | 6 | 11 | 0 |
| Goal difference | +25 | +22 | +3 | 0 |
| Average GF per game | 1.28 | 1.65 | 0.88 | 0 |
| Average GA per game | 0.52 | 0.35 | 0.69 | 0 |
| Points (League) | 56 | 37 | 19 | 0 |
| Winning rate | 54.55% | 76.47% | 31.25% | N/A |
| Most appearances | 31 | Nilson Corrêa; Mohsen Bengar | | |
| Most minutes played | 2790 | Nilson Corrêa | | |
| Top scorer | 6 | Mohammadreza Khalatbari; Mehdi Seyed Salehi | | |
| Top assister | 8 | Payam Sadeghian | | |

Updated as of 11 April 2014
Source: Competitions

== Club ==
=== Kit ===
Supplier: (Germany) Uhlsport

| Home Kit | Away Kit | Third Kit |

Source: "Persepolis F.C.' current kit". Archived from the original on 29 January 2010.

=== Official sponsors ===
• (Germany) Uhlsport • (Iran) Sadra System Pasargad

• (Iran) Tourism Bank

Source: Persepolis F.C. official website

=== Captains ===
Updated on 11 April 2014

| No. | Pos | Nat | Name | Pro League | Hazfi Cup | No.Games as Captain | Notes |
|---|---|---|---|---|---|---|---|
| 14 | MF | (Iran) | Mohammad Nouri | 15 | 2 | 17 | Captain |
| 4 | DF | (Iran) | Jalal Hosseini | 12 | 1 | 13 | Vice-captain |
| 20 | DF | (Iran) | Alireza Nourmohammadi | 3 | 0 | 3 | |

=== Coaching staff ===
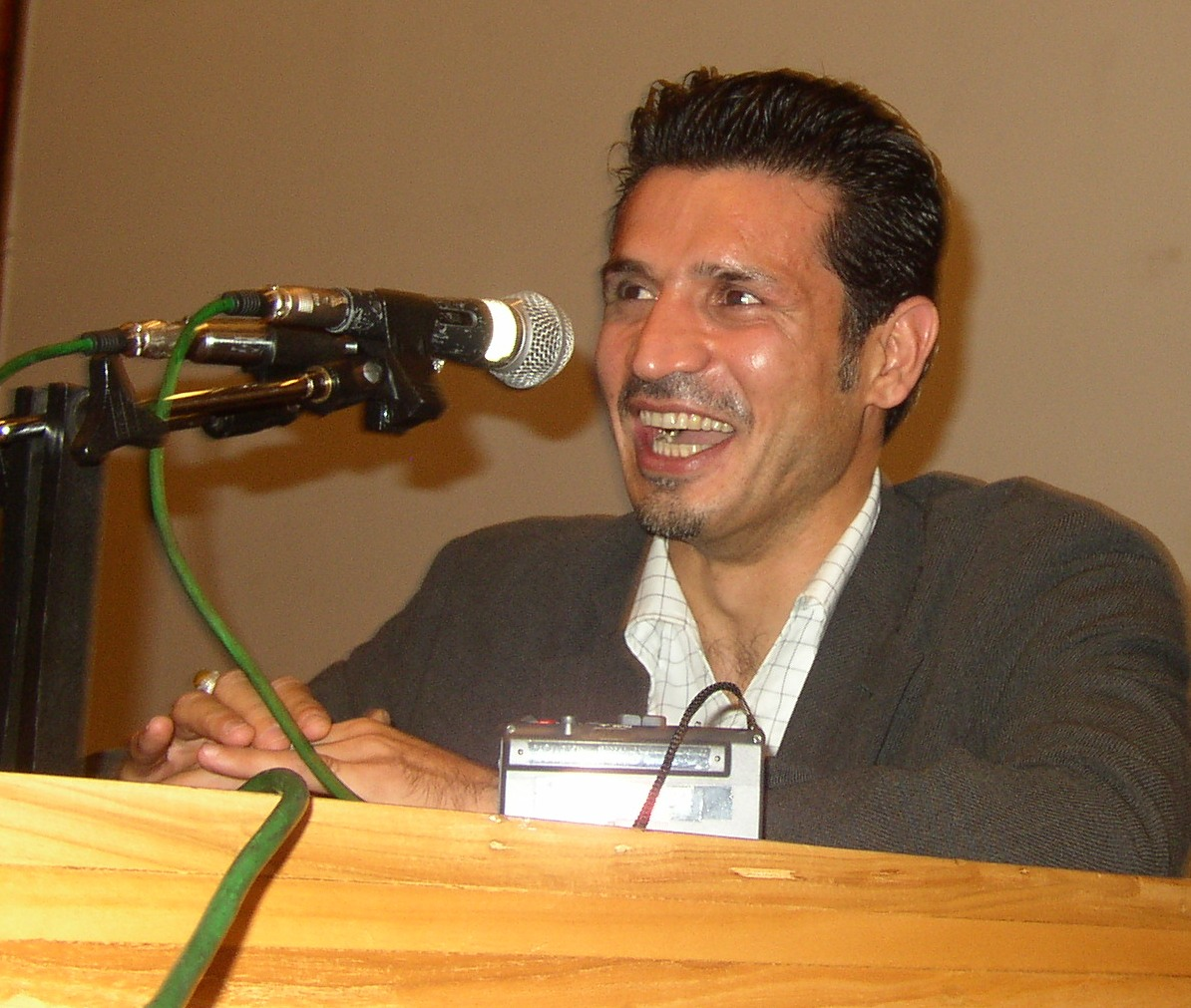
Ali Daei, Persepolis head coach in the 2013–14 season

| Position | Staff |
|---|---|
| Head coach | (Iran) Ali Daei |
| Assistant coach | (Iran) Karim Bagheri |
| First Team coach | (Iran) Reza Forouzani |
| First Team coach | (Iran) Mohammad Daei |
| Fitness Trainer | (Iran) Mohammad Reza Molaei |
| Goalkeepers coach | (Iran) Behzad Gholampour |
| Analyzer | (Iran) Javad Manafi |
| Doctor | (Iran) Dr Alireza Haghighat |
| Physiotherapists | (Iran) Meysam Alipour |
| Doctor Supply | (Iran) Dr. Faraj Zadeh |
| Doctor Clinic | (Iran) Dr. Sodi |
| Psychologist | (Iran) Mehdi Khanban |
| Team Manager | (Iran) Saeid Shirini (until March 2014) (Iran) Mohammad Panjali (since March 2014) |

=== Other personnel ===
| Chairman | (Iran) Ali Parvin |
| Deputy Chairman | (Iran) Behrouz Montaghami |
| Adviser High Chairman | (Iran) Jafar Kashani |
| Assistant Execution | (Iran) Saeid Shirini |
| Assistant Manager Cultural | (Iran) Amir Giroudi |
| Football Academy President | (Iran) Hamid Estili |
| Things Pioneers Manager | (Iran) Iraj Pazoki |
| Media Officer | (Iran) Hamid Abbasi |
| Media Supervisor | (Iran) Hossein Ghodosi |
| Disciplinarian Committee Ruler | (Iran) Mahmoud Salarkia |
| Assistant Legal | (Iran) Mostafa Shokri |
| Official Manager | (Iran) Mohsen Sohrabi |
| Official Website | (Iran) Mosa Hosseini |

Updated to match played 22 January 2014
Source: fc-perspolis.com

=== Club committees ===
Board of Directions
(Iran) Mohammad Rouyanian
(Iran) Ali Parvin (caretaker chairman)
(Iran) Mohammad Hassan Nami
(Iran) Mohammad Jamshidi
(Iran) Mohammad Sadegh Akbari

Technical Committee
(Iran) Ali Parvin (President)
(Iran) Reza Vatankhah
(Iran) Afshin Peyrovani
(Iran) Ebrahim Ashtiani
(Iran) Mahmoud Khordbin

Medico Committee
(Iran) Professor Farhad Farid
(Iran) Dr. Majid Laelroshan
(Iran) Dr. Babak Zargar Amini
(Iran) Dr. Amir Hossein Barati
(Iran) Dr. Mohammad Taban
(Iran) Dr. Darioush Soudi

Munition Team
(Iran) Ghasem Abdolsamadi
(Iran) Asghar Norouzali

Updated to match played 8 July 2012
Source: fc-perspolis.com

=== Grounds ===
| Ground (capacity and dimensions) | Azadi Stadium (100,000 / 110x75m) |
| Training ground | Derafshifar Stadium |

== See also ==
- 2013–14 Persian Gulf Cup
- 2013–14 Hazfi Cup
