= Mohammad Rouyanian =

Iranian businessman, football administrator and Revolutionary Guard commander

Sardar Mohammad-Reza Rouyanian
- محمد رویانیان
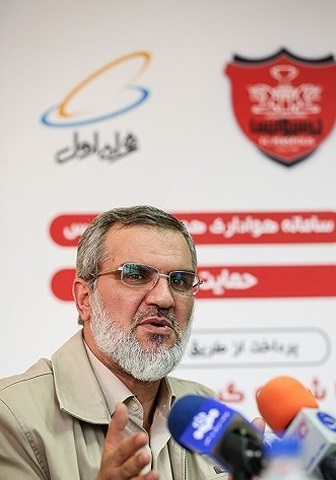
- Born: Anooshiravan Rouyanian; May 12, 1960 (age 65); Nowshahr, Imperial State of Iran
- Military career
- Branch: Revolutionary Committees; Revolutionary Guards; Law Enforcement Force
- Service years: 1981–2007
- Rank: 2nd Brigadier general
- Commands: Traffic Police of Tehran
- Conflicts: Iran–Iraq War

Mohammad Reza Rouyanian (Persian: محمدرضا رویانیان) is an Iranian businessman, football administrator and former Revolutionary Guard commander. He was the chairman of multisport club Persepolis Athletic and Cultural Club from 20 September 2011 until his resignation on 22 January 2014. He was Head of Transportation Management Center from 2007 to 2011. Before that, he was Commissioner of the City of Tehran Transportation Police between 2005 and 2007.

== Early life ==
He was born on 12 May 1960 in Noor, Mazandaran province, Imperial State of Iran. He joined the City of Noor Police in 1981 and became Commissioner ten years later. After serving two years as Commissioner of Noor Police, he was appointed as Commissioner of Mazandaran Province Police in 1993.

== Police career ==
He was Commissioner of Mazandaran Province Police from 1993 to 2000. He was appointed as first Head of Social Section and was in office until 2005. He became Commissioner of the City of Tehran Transportation Police in 2005. Rouyanian retired in 2007 and was appointed as the head of the Transportation Management Center by President Mahmoud Ahmadinejad the same year. He resigned from this position in 2011.

== Sports career ==
He was a member of Iran military team from 1985 to 1990. He was Ahmadinejad's candidate as head of National Sports Organization in 2009 to succeeding Mohammad Aliabadi but he was refused and withdrawn from this position. He was appointed as one of the board of directors of the Persepolis club on 19 September 2011 and was elected as chairman of Persepolis and succeeded Habib Kashani, a day after on 20 September 2011.

He managed to attract major players in the transfer season, summer 2012. Shahab Gordan, Jalal Hosseini, Hossein Mahini, Mehrdad Pouladi, Mohsen Bengar, Mohammad Ghazi, Mohammad Reza Khanzadeh, Afshin Esmaeilzadeh, Roberto Sousa, Karim Ansarifard, Amir Abedzadeh, Mehrzad Madanchi and Nilson Corrêa, are an example of his purchase. Since then, the team was dubbed the Red Galaxy. After Denizli's resignation, he open talks with Manuel José, Bruno Metsu, Gérard Houllier and Gabriel Calderón and finally signs with Manuel José. In middle of that season José was fired and Yahya Golmohammadi who was the second team coach accepted the president's offer to lead Persepolis. On 20 May 2013, Ali Daei was officially announced as the club's manager for the next three seasons by Rouyanian. On 22 January 2014, Rouyanian resigned as the club's chairman and his resignation was accepted by the board of directors.

=== Signings ===
| Rank | Player | From | Year |
|---|---|---|---|
| 1. | (Iran) Saeid Ghadami | (Iran) Foolad | 2011 |
| 2. | (Libya) Éamon Zayed | (Republic of Ireland) Derry City | 2011 |
| 3. | (Iran) Mehdi Mahdavikia | (Iran) Damash Gilan | 2012 |
| 4. | (Iran) Hossein Hooshyar | (Iran) Shahrdari Yasuj | 2012 |
| 5. | (Iran) Hossein Kanaani | Youth System | 2012 |
| 6. | (Iran) Mehrdad Pooladi | (Iran) Mes Kerman | 2012 |
| 7. | (Bosnia and Herzegovina) Asmir Avdukić | (Bosnia and Herzegovina) Borac Banja Luka | 2012 |
| 8. | (Iran) Mohammad Ghazi | (Iran) Zob Ahan | 2012 |
| 9. | (Iran) Shahab Gordan | (Iran) Zob Ahan | 2012 |
| 10. | (Iran) Hossein Mahini | (Iran) Zob Ahan | 2012 |
| 11. | (Iran) Jalal Hosseini | (Iran) Sepahan | 2012 |
| 12. | (Iran) Mohsen Bengar | (Iran) Sepahan | 2012 |
| 13. | (Iran) Mohammad Reza Khanzadeh | (Iran) Rah Ahan | 2012 |
| 14. | (Iran) Afshin Esmaeilzadeh | (Iran) Damash | 2012 |
| 15. | (Iran) Karim Ansarifard | (Iran) Saipa | 2012 |
| 16. | (Brazil) Roberto Sousa | (Portugal) Marítimo | 2012 |
| 17. | (Iran) Amir Abedzadeh | (United States) LA Blues | 2012 |
| 18. | (Iran) Mehrzad Madanchi | (United Arab Emirates) Al-Shaab | 2012 |
| 19. | (Brazil) Nilson Corrêa | (Portugal) Guimarães | 2012 |
| 20. | (Iran) Reza Haghighi | (Iran) Fajr Sepasi | 2013 |
| 21. | (Iran) Adel Kolahkaj | (Iran) Sepahan | 2013 |
| 22. | (Serbia) Marko Perović | (Serbia) Red Star Belgrade | 2013 |
| 23. | (Iran) Reza Mohammadi | (Iran) Sepahan | 2013 |
| 24. | (North Macedonia) Vlatko Grozdanoski | (China) Liaoning Whowin | 2013 |
| 25. | (Iran) Omid Alishah | (Iran) Rah Ahan | 2013 |
| 26. | (Iran) Mehdi Seyed-Salehi | (Iran) Tractor Sazi | 2013 |
| 27. | (Iran) Meysam Hosseini | (Iran) Naft Tehran | 2013 |
| 28. | (Iran) Mehrdad Kafshgari | (Iran) Rah Ahan | 2013 |
| 29. | (Iran) Milad Gharibi | (Iran) Saipa | 2013 |
| 30. | (Iran) Mohammad Abbaszadeh | (Iran) Nassaji | 2013 |
| 31. | (Iran) Younes Shakeri | (Iran) Aboomoslem | 2013 |
| 32. | (Iran) Payam Sadeghian | (Iran) Zob Ahan | 2013 |
| 33. | (Iran) Ghasem Dehnavi | (Iran) Tractor Sazi | 2013 |
| 34. | (Montenegro) Marko Šćepanović | (Montenegro) FK Mladost Podgorica | 2013 |
| 35. | (Iran) Milad Kamandani | Youth System | 2013 |
| 36. | (Iran) Farshad Ghasemi | Youth System | 2013 |
| 37. | (Iran) Mohammad Reza Khalatbari | (United Arab Emirates) Ajman | 2013 |
| 38. | (Iran) Farzad Hatami | (Iran) Foolad | 2013 |

Business positions
| Preceded by Habib Kashani | Persepolis chairman 2011–2014 | Succeeded by Ali Parvin |
