= Touraj =

Touraj or Tooraj is a given name. Notable people with the given name include:

- Touraj Atabaki (born 1950), Dutch-Iranian social historian
- Touraj Daryaee (born 1967), Iranian Iranologist and historian
- Tooraj Haghverdi (born 1973), Iranian football referee
- Touraj Houshmandzadeh Jr. (born 1977), American football player
- Touraj Keshtkar (born 1987), Iranian-born Norwegian singer, painter, model, and television host
