= Mehrdad Kafshgari =

Iranian footballer

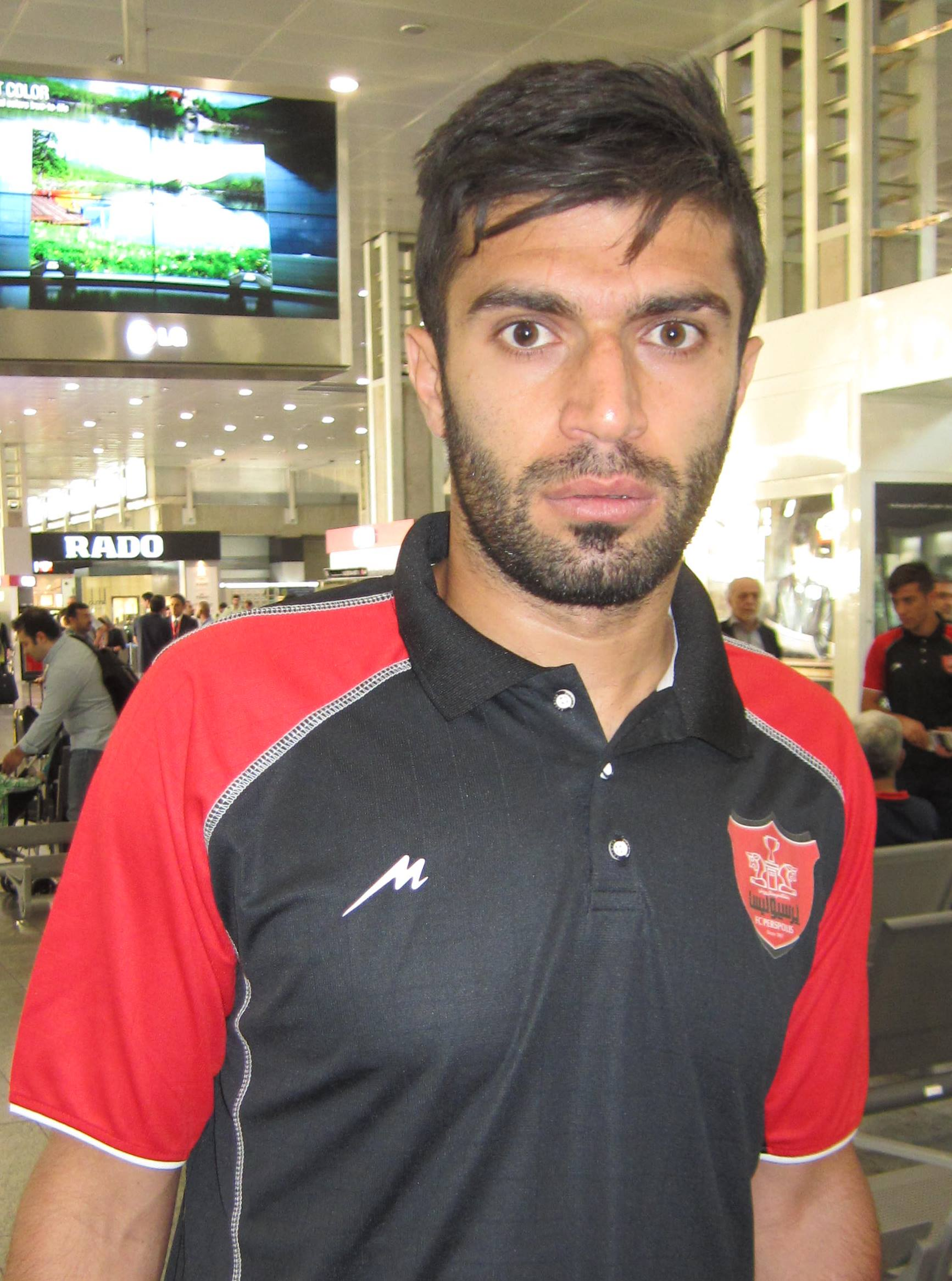
- Kafshgari, July 2015

Personal information
- Full name: Mehrdad Kafshgari
- Date of birth: 22 April 1987 (age 39)
- Place of birth: Qaem Shahr, Iran
- Height: 1.85 m (6 ft 1 in)
- Position: Midfielder

Youth career
- 2001–2005: Shahrdari Sari
- 2005–2006: Shahrdari Amirkola
- 2006–2007: Persepolis Qaem Shahr

Senior career*
Years	Team	Apps	(Gls)
2007–2008	Damash Tehran	20	(2)
2008–2011	Damash Lorestan	65	(4)
2011–2013	Rah Ahan	42	(1)
2013–2016	Persepolis	47	(1)
2016–2017	Padideh	25	(2)
2017–2018	Khooneh be Khooneh	16	(2)
2018–2019	Saipa	17	(1)
2019–2020	Nassaji	2	(0)

International career
2003–2005	Iran U17	8	(2)
2005–2007	Iran U20	9	(1)
- * Club domestic league appearances and goals as of 27 October 2016

Mehrdad Kafshgari (born 22 April 1987) is an Iranian football midfielder who played for Nassaji in the Persian Gulf Pro League.

== Career ==
=== Rah Ahan ===
He joined to Rah Ahan in summer 2011. He played two seasons for Rah Ahan in the IPL and played 42 games and scored one time.

=== Persepolis ===
He signed a three-year contract with Persepolis on 26 May 2013 and was used as midfielder. He scored his first goal for Persepolis in a 6–0 away victory over Mes Kerman.

=== Club career statistics ===
As of 9 April 2015

Club	Division	Season	League		Hazfi Cup		Asia		Total	
Club	Division	Season	Apps	Goals	Apps	Goals	Apps	Goals	Apps	Goals
Rah Ahan	Pro League	2011–12	14	0	1	0	–	–	15	0
Rah Ahan	Pro League	2012–13	28	1	1	0	–	–	29	1
Persepolis	Pro League	2013–14	18	1	1	0	–	–	19	1
Persepolis	Pro League	2014–15	21	0	3	0	5	0	28	0
Persepolis	Pro League	2015–16	8	0	1	0	–	–	9	0
Career Total	Pro League		89	2	7	0	5	0	101	2

== Honours ==
Persepolis

- Iran Pro League runner-up: 2013–14, 2015–16
