= Saeid Shirini =

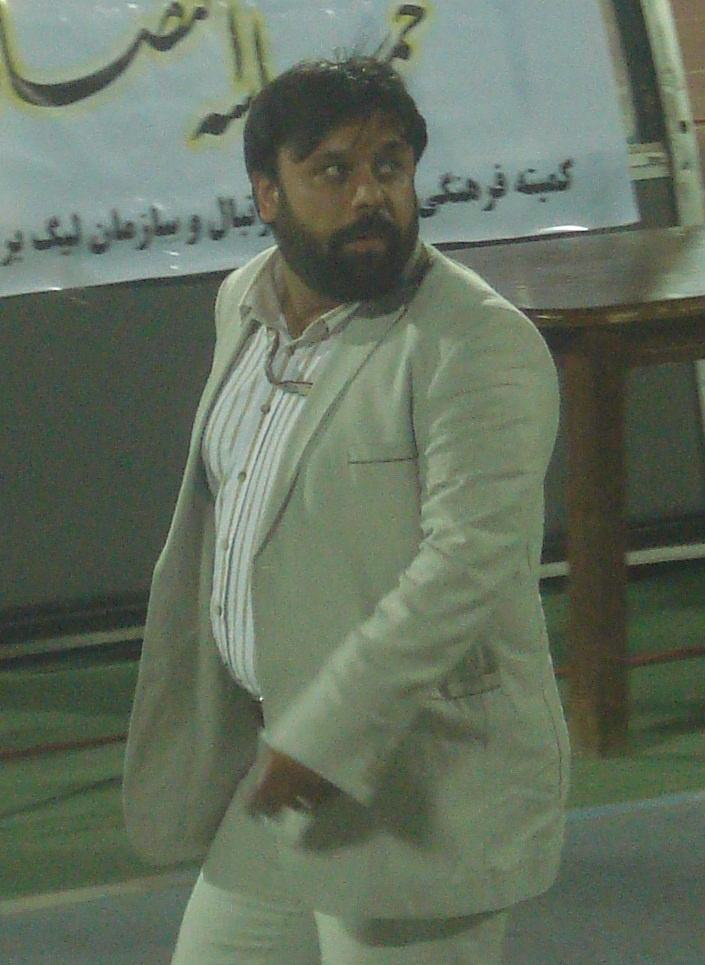
- Born: 6 January 1963 (age 63); Tehran, Iran
- Education: Azad University
- Occupations: Football administrator businessman
- Title: Former Team manager of Persepolis Club

Saeid Shirini or Saad Shirini (سعید شیرینی in Persian, born on 6 January 1963 in Tehran, Iran) is an Iranian businessman and the former team manager of Persepolis. After Mohammad Rouyanian becomes chairman of the Persepolis, Saad Shirini was appointed as one of his deputies. After the resignation of Mohammad Zadmehr as team manager of the club, he was appointed as his caretaker successor. Before the start of the new season, his appointment becomes permanent. After that, many Persepolis legends criticized his appointment because he is not a footballer person. On 25 February 2014, he was arrested by the Iranian police because of his economic activities at his own company, Sadra. On 1 March, he was removed from his position as team manager of Persepolis.
