= Farshad Ghasemi =

Iranian football player (born 1993)

Personal information
- Date of birth: 11 March 1993 (age 33)
- Place of birth: Tehran, Iran
- Height: 1.75 m (5 ft 9 in)
- Positions: Right back; winger

Team information
- Current team: Fard Alborz
- Number: 77

Youth career
- –2014: Persepolis
- 2011–2013: → Moghavemat Tehran (loan)

Senior career*
Years	Team	Apps	(Gls)
2013–2015	Persepolis	1	(0)
2015	→ Saipa (loan)	4	(0)
2015–2016	Hormozgan	12	(0)
2016	Padideh	0	(0)
2016–2017	PAS Hamedan		
2017–2018	Rah Ahan	13	(0)
2018–2020	Dinamo Sokhumi		
2020–2021	Shohada Babolsar		
2021–2023	Shahid Oraki		
2023	Shohadaye Razakan		
2023–2024	Yadman Tehran		
2024	Shohadaye Razakan		
2024–	Fard Alborz		

International career
2013	Iran U-20	1	(0)
- * Club domestic league appearances and goals as of 29 April 2018

Farshad Ghasemi (Persian: فرشاد قاسمی; born 11 March 1993) is an Iranian football player who plays for Fard Alborz in the League 2.

== Career ==
=== Persepolis ===
He trained with Persepolis for one week. He joined Persepolis on 11 July 2013. He played for Persepolis U21 in AFC Vision Asia U-21 Tehran Premier League. He made his debut for Persepolis in a match against Mes Kerman in week 18 of 2013–14 Iran Pro League. On 28 December 2014 he released from Persepolis.

=== Club career statistics ===
As of 15 May 2015

Club	Division	Season	League		Hazfi Cup		Asia		Total	
Club	Division	Season	Apps	Goals	Apps	Goals	Apps	Goals	Apps	Goals
Persepolis	Pro League	2013–14	1	0	0	0	–	–	1	0
Persepolis	Pro League	2014–15	0	0	1	0	0	0	1	0
Saipa	Pro League	2014–15	4	0	0	0	0	0	4	0
Career Total			5	0	1	0	0	0	6	0

== International career ==
=== Iran U–20 ===
He was called up to the Iran U–20 team by Ali Doustimehr in November 2013.

=== Iran U–23 ===
He was called up to the Iran U–23 team by Nelo Vingada in June 2014.

== Honours ==
Persepolis

- Iran Pro League: 2013–14 (Runner-up)
