= Derafshifar Stadium =

Iranian sports venue

Persepolis (Derafshifar) Training camp
- Interactive map of Persepolis (Derafshifar) Training camp
- Address: Jannat Abad, Kashani Expressway, Bakeri Expressway Intersection
- Location: Northwest Tehran; Tehran
- Coordinates: 35°44′38.32″N 51°17′53.67″E
- Owner: Persepolis
- Type: Sports facility

Construction
- Renovated: 2010

Derafshifar Stadium (Persian: ورزشگاه درفشی فر) is the training ground and Academy base of Iranian football club Persepolis. It is located in the Jannatabad neighborhood of Tehran.

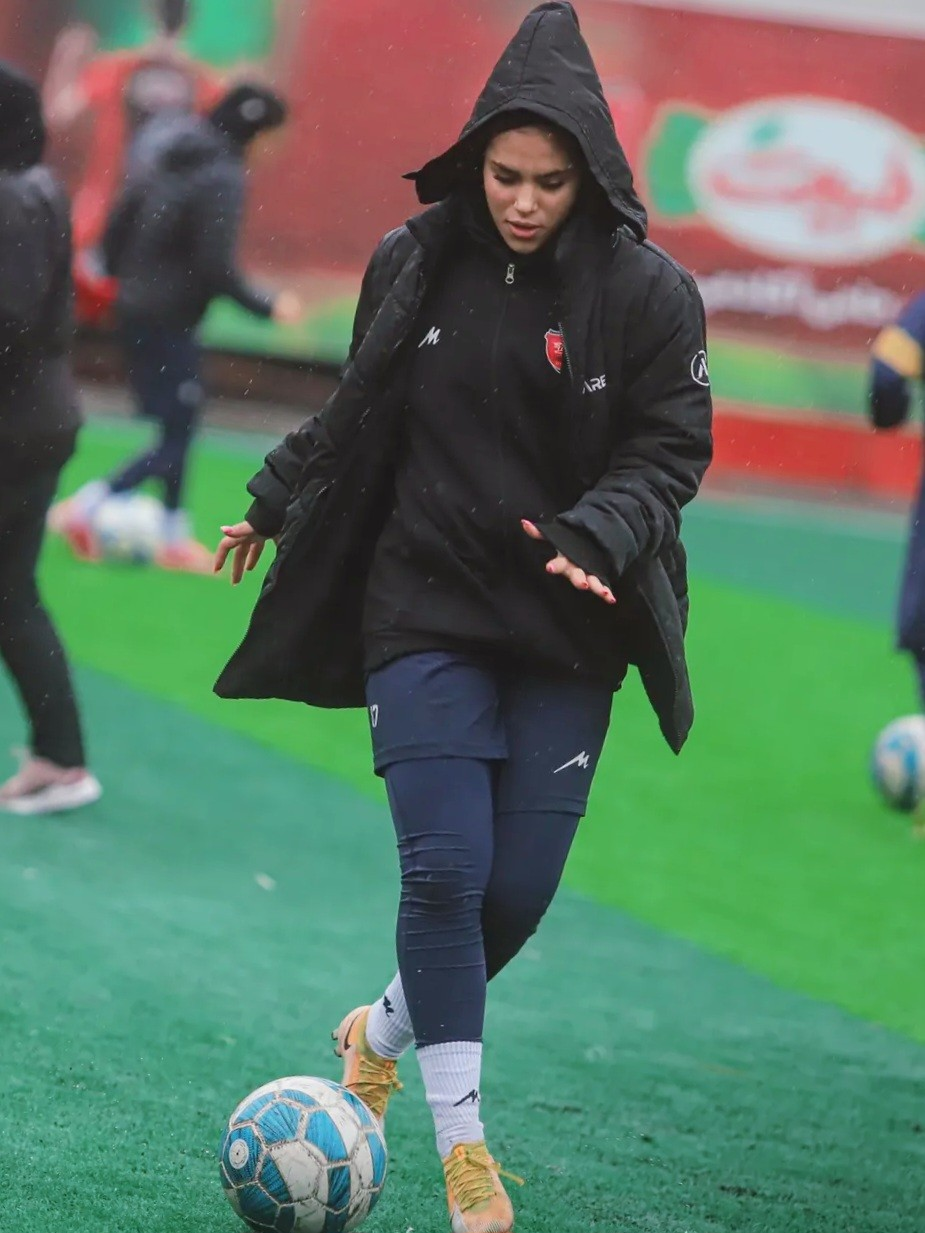
Persepolis F.C.W. training at Derafshifar Stadium in 2025

The stadium also hosted the training and matches of Persepolis women's football team from 2024.
