= Persepolis Qaem Shahr F.C. =

Iranian football club

Persepolis Qaemshahr
- Full name: Persepolis Qaem Shahr Football Club
- Owner: Rameshgar & Persepolis Football Club
- Chairman: (Iran) Ebrahim Misaghi
Home colours	Away colours	Third colours

Persepolis Qaem Shahr Football Club (Persian: باشگاه فوتبال پرسپولیس قائم‌شهر) is an Iranian football club based in Qaem Shahr, Iran. It currently competes in the Mazandaran Provincial League. On September 25, 2012; Persepolis Qaem Shahr's chairman signed a contract with Rouyanian, the chairman of Persepolis, establishing Persepolis Qaem Shahr as one of Persepolis's sections.

== The Academy ==
=== Current squad ===
==== First-team squad ====
- Head Coach: Farhad Kochak Zadeh

Note: Flags indicate national team as defined under FIFA eligibility rules; some limited exceptions apply. Players may hold more than one non-FIFA nationality.

No.	Pos.	Nation	Player
—	FW	IRN	Saber Moghimi
—	MF	IRN	Abbas Taheri
—	MF	IRN	Akbar Yousefi
—	MF	IRN	Taghi Mosavi
—	MF	IRN	Aiat Abangah

No.	Pos.	Nation	Player
—	FW	IRN	Mehdi Foladi
—	FW	IRN	Ahmad Katal
—	MF	IRN	Ali Hasani
—	MF	IRN	Sajjad Bazri

==== U-23 ====
- Head Coach:

Note: Flags indicate national team as defined under FIFA eligibility rules; some limited exceptions apply. Players may hold more than one non-FIFA nationality.

No.	Pos.	Nation	Player
—	FW	IRN	Sajjad Ashouri
—	MF	IRN	Hasan Shoshtari

No.	Pos.	Nation	Player
—	MF	IRN	Hossein Shabani

==== U-20 ====
- Head Coach:

Note: Flags indicate national team as defined under FIFA eligibility rules; some limited exceptions apply. Players may hold more than one non-FIFA nationality.

No. / Pos. / Nation / Player; — / MF / IRN / Hossein Shabani	No. / Pos. / Nation / Player

==== U-17 ====
- Head Coach:

Note: Flags indicate national team as defined under FIFA eligibility rules; some limited exceptions apply. Players may hold more than one non-FIFA nationality.

No. / Pos. / Nation / Player	No. / Pos. / Nation / Player

==== U-14 ====
- Head Coach:

Note: Flags indicate national team as defined under FIFA eligibility rules; some limited exceptions apply. Players may hold more than one non-FIFA nationality.

No. / Pos. / Nation / Player	No. / Pos. / Nation / Player

== Season-by-season ==
The table below shows the achievements of the club in various competitions.

Season	League	Position	Hazfi Cup	Notes
2010–11	3rd Division	5th/Group 2	Did not qualify

== See also ==
- Persepolis F.C. Academy
- Iran Football's 3rd Division 2010–11
