= Younes Shakeri =

Iranian footballer

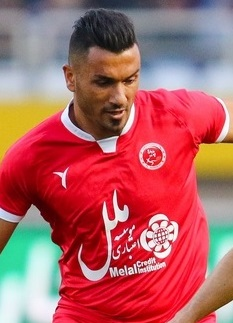

Personal information
- Date of birth: 1 January 1990 (age 36)
- Place of birth: Neyshabur, Iran
- Height: 1.88 m (6 ft 2 in)
- Positions: Forward; striker

Youth career
- 2005–2008: Aboomoslem

Senior career*
Years	Team	Apps	(Gls)
2008–2010	Aboomoslem	26	(1)
2010–2012	Fajr Sepasi	49	(1)
2012–2013	Aboomoslem	24	(11)
2013–2014	Persepolis	5	(0)
2013–2014	→ Padideh (loan)	15	(9)
2014–2017	Padideh	78	(7)
2017–2018	Siah Jamegan	23	(3)
2018–2020	Shahr Khodro	42	(13)
2020	→ Gol Gohar (loan)	14	(6)
2020–2023	Gol Gohar	44	(10)
2023–2024	Havadar	14	(2)
2024–2025	Shahrdari Noshahr	8	(1)
2025	Palayesh Naft	11	(1)
- * Club domestic league appearances and goals as of 30 April 2025

Younes Shakeri (Persian: یونس شاکری; born 1 January 1990) is an Iranian football forward who plays for Palayesh Naft in Azadegan League.

== Career ==
=== Aboomoslem ===
He joined Aboomoslem in summer 2005 from the club's youth academy. He started his professional career with Aboomoslem's first team in 2008.

=== Fajr Sepasi ===
He played two seasons for Aboomoslem and moved to Fajr Sepasi in summer 2010. Shakeri played with Fajr Sepasi until 2012.

=== Aboomoslem ===
Shakeri return to Aboomoslem in 2012. He played in 25 games, scored 12 times and received 7 yellow cards. He was second top goalscorer in the 2012–13 Azadegan League.

=== Persepolis ===
He signed a three-year contract with Persepolis on 3 May 2013. He made 5 league appearances before being loaned out to Padideh.

=== Padideh ===
On 27 November 2013 he joined his home side, Padideh, with a 4-month loan deal. He scored two goals in his first game for Padideh in the Azadegan League. He netted a hat-trick in a match with Niroye Zamini. Shakeri became Padide's leading scorer and led Padideh to an Iran Pro League promotion.

On 24 May 2014, Shakeri signed a permanent deal with Padideh worth 550 million Rial. He also scored Padideh's first goal in their first season in the Iran Pro League during a 3–0 win over Naft Masjed Soleyman on 8 August 2014.

=== Club career statistics ===
As of 6 December 2014.

Club	Division	Season	League		Hazfi Cup		Asia		Total	
Club	Division	Season	Apps	Goals	Apps	Goals	Apps	Goals	Apps	Goals
Aboomoslem	Pro League	2008–09	3	0	1	0	–	–	4	0
Aboomoslem	Pro League	2009–10	23	1	0	0	–	–	23	1
Aboomoslem	Total		26	1	1	0	0	0	27	1
Fajr Sepasi	Division 1	2010–11	21	0	2	0	–	–	23	0
Fajr Sepasi	Pro League	2011–12	28	1	0	0	–	–	28	1
Fajr Sepasi	Total		49	1	2	0	0	0	51	1
Aboomoslem	Division 1	2012–13	23	11	2	1	–	–	25	12
Persepolis	Pro League	2013	5	0	2	1	–	–	7	1
Padideh	Division 1	2013-14	15	9	0	0	–	–	15	9
Padideh	Pro League	2014–15	11	1	2	2	–	–	13	3
Padideh	Total		26	10	2	2	0	0	28	12
Career totals			129	25	9	4	0	0	138	29

== Honours ==
=== Club ===
Padideh

- Azadegan League: 2013–14
