= Milad Gharibi =

Iranian footballer

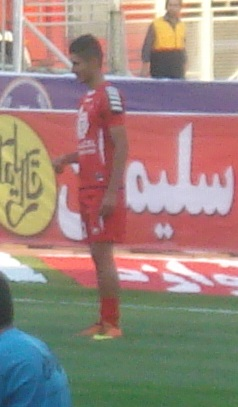

Personal information
- Date of birth: 20 February 1992 (age 34)
- Place of birth: Gachsaran, Iran
- Height: 1.80 m (5 ft 11 in)
- Positions: Winger; midfielder

Team information
- Current team: Shahr Raz
- Number: 11

Youth career
- 2009–2010: Naft Gachsaran
- 2010–2013: Saipa

Senior career*
| Years | Team | Apps | (Gls) |
| 2010–2013 | Saipa | 80 | (8) |
| 2013–2014 | Persepolis | 1 | (0) |
| 2013–2014 | → Zob Ahan (loan) | 13 | (1) |
| 2014–2016 | Padideh | 36 | (2) |
| 2018–2020 | Fajr | 40 | (8) |
| 2020–2021 | Mes Kernan | 28 | (0) |
| 2021–2022 | Kheybar | 26 | (3) |
| 2022–2023 | Pars Jonoubi Jam | 18 | (6) |
| 2023–2024 | Shahr Raz | 23 | (5) |
| 2024–2025 | Mes Kernan | 5 | (0) |
| 2025– | Shahr Raz | 4 | (0) |

International career^{‡}
| 2009–2010 | Iran U17 | 5 | (1) |
| 2010–2012 | Iran U20 | 4 | (2) |
| 2012–2014 | Iran U23 | 10 | (5) |
- * Club domestic league appearances and goals as of 16 April 2025 ‡ National team caps and goals as of 25 March 2013

Milad Gharibi (Persian: میلاد غریبی; born 20 February 1992) is an Iranian footballer who plays for Shahr Raz of Azadegan League as a winger.

== Club career ==
=== Saipa ===
Gharibi joined Saipa in 2010 after spending the previous season with Naft Gachsaran in the 2nd Division of Iranian Football. He scored his first professional league goal in a match against Foolad when he was 18 years old.

During the 2011–12 season, Gharbi provided nine assists for his teammates, the most in the league. He appeared in 29 IPL games, starting in twelve of them. He scored a total of four goals against Rah Ahan, Sanat Naft, Damash Gilan and Persepolis. In 2012–13 season, he played a total of 2066 minutes scoring three goals in the start of the season against Paykan, Sepahan and Damash Gilan, all games which Saipa won. He failed to add to his tally in 2013.

=== Persepolis ===
Gharibi joined Persepolis on 25 May 2013 on an agreement for two years. He signed his contract on 1 July 2013 after passing medical tests. He made his debut in a match against his former team Saipa and played 45 minutes.

=== Zob Ahan (loan) ===
He joined Zob Ahan on November 18, 2013, with a six months loan contract. He made 13 league appearances with Zob Ahan, scoring once before returning to his parent club Persepolis.

=== Padideh ===
He was loaned to newly promoted Iran Pro League side Padideh for the 2014–15 season.

=== Club career statistics ===
As of 2 December 2014

| Club | Division | Season | League | | Hazfi Cup | | Asia | | Total | |
| Club | Division | Season | Apps | Goals | Apps | Goals | Apps | Goals | Apps | Goals |
|---|---|---|---|---|---|---|---|---|---|---|
| Saipa | Pro League | 2010–11 | 22 | 1 | 0 | 0 | – | – | 22 | 1 |
| Saipa | Pro League | 2011–12 | 29 | 4 | 0 | 0 | – | – | 29 | 4 |
| Saipa | Pro League | 2012–13 | 29 | 3 | 0 | 0 | – | – | 28 | 3 |
| Persepolis | Pro League | 2013–14 | 1 | 0 | 2 | 1 | – | – | 3 | 1 |
| Zob Ahan | Pro League | 2013–14 | 11 | 1 | 0 | 0 | – | – | 11 | 1 |
| Padideh | Pro League | 2014–15 | 21 | 2 | 3 | 1 | – | – | 24 | 3 |
| Career Total | | | 104 | 11 | 5 | 2 | 0 | 0 | 109 | 13 |

- Assists

| Season | Team | Assists |
|---|---|---|
| 10–11 | Saipa | 2 |
| 11–12 | Saipa | 9 |
| 12–13 | Saipa | 2 |
| 13–14 | Persepolis | 1 |

== International career ==
=== Under 17 ===
Gharibi represented Iran U-17 in the 2009 FIFA U-17 World Cup in Nigeria. He did not feature in Iran's first two games, however he started and scored the sole goal in Iran's final group match against the Netherlands. He was also subbed in on the 85th min in the round of 16 match against Uruguay.

=== Under 22 ===
Gharibi established himself as a main figure for the under-22 in the qualification for the 2013 AFC U-22 Championship scoring two goals against the Maldives. In the 2013 Qatar Tournament he provided several assists as Iran marched onto 3 wins against, Qatar, Morocco and Turkey.

=== International goals ===
International U-17 goals
| 1 | 31 October 2009 | Enugu, Nigeria | Netherlands | 1–0 | Won | 2009 FIFA U-17 World Cup |

International U-20 goals
| 1 | 4 October 2010 | Linzi, China | South Korea | 1–2 | Lose | 2010 AFC U-19 Championship |
| 2 | 8 October 2010 | Linzi, China | Yemen | 2–0 | Won | 2010 AFC U-19 Championship |

International U-22 goals
| 1 | 12 June 2012 | Rome, Italy | Italy | 6–2 | Won | Friendly |
| 2 | 12 June 2012 | Rome, Italy | Italy | 6–2 | Won | Friendly |
| 3 | 28 June 2012 | Malacca, Malaysia | Maldives | 7–0 | Won | 2014 AFC Asian Cup qualification |
| 4 | 28 June 2012 | Malacca, Malaysia | Maldives | 7–0 | Won | 2014 AFC Asian Cup qualification |
| 5 | 4 September 2012 | Tehran, Iran | Syria | 3–1 | Won | Friendly |
