= Nilson (footballer, born 1975) =

Brazilian footballer (born 1975)

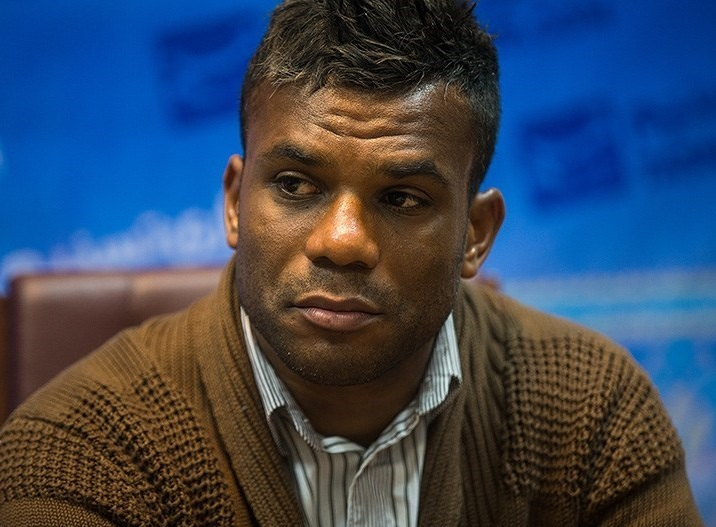
- Nilson in 2014

Personal information
- Full name: Nilson Corrêa Júnior
- Date of birth: 26 December 1975 (age 50)
- Place of birth: Vitória, Brazil
- Height: 1.85 m (6 ft 1 in)
- Position: Goalkeeper

Youth career
- 1992–1994: Vitória

Senior career*
Years	Team	Apps	(Gls)
1995–1998	Vitória	69	(0)
1999–2003	Santa Cruz	57	(0)
2000	→ Gama (loan)	12	(0)
2001	→ Inter de Limeira (loan)	35	(0)
2004	Americano	2	(0)
2005	Náutico	12	(0)
2005–2012	Vitória Guimarães	196	(0)
2012–2015	Persepolis	67	(0)
2015–2016	Moreirense	2	(0)
2016–2017	União Madeira	28	(0)
Total		480	(0)

International career
1993	Brazil U17	5	(0)
1995–1997	Brazil U20	6	(0)

Managerial career
- 2019: Flamengo Arcoverde
- 2019: Ypiranga-PE
- 2019–2020: Decisão
- 2020: Vera Cruz
- 2021: Retrô
- 2021: Central
- 2022: Potiguar de Mossoró
- 2022: Tupynambás
- 2022–2023: Maguary
- 2023: Aymorés
- 2024: Tirol
- 2025: Colo Colo-BA
- 2025: Caldense
- 2026: Oliveira Hospital
- * Club domestic league appearances and goals

Nilson Corrêa Júnior (born 26 December 1975), known simply as Nilson, is a Brazilian former professional footballer who played as a goalkeeper. He is currently a manager.

Most of his 22-year career was spent in Portugal with Vitória de Guimarães, where he appeared in 226 competitive matches over seven seasons, six in the Primeira Liga. He also played for three years with Persepolis in Iran.

== Club career ==
=== Brazil ===
Born in Vitória, Espírito Santo, Nílson started his career at Esporte Clube Vitória, signing with Santa Cruz Futebol Clube in 1999 and achieving promotion from the Campeonato Brasileiro Série B in the same year. He then had loan spells at Sociedade Esportiva do Gama and Associação Atlética Internacional (Limeira).

Nilson was released by Santa Cruz in 2003, for financial reasons. After an injury-ridden stint with Americano FC, he joined Clube Náutico Capibaribe where he won the Campeonato Pernambucano.

=== Vitória Guimarães ===
In 2003, Nílson was spotted by Vitória S.C. manager Jorge Jesus and agent António Texeira while playing footvolley, with Jesus wanting him to play in Portugal. They lost touch, but later he was contacted again by Teixeira and agreed to move to Portugal that year after his €90,000 release clause was paid, being first choice from the start but not being able to prevent, however, the Guimarães side from being relegated to the Segunda Liga in his first season.

After only missing two league games in 2006–07 as the Minho team returned to the Primeira Liga, Nilson played all matches the following campaign as they achieved a third place, subsequently reaching the third qualifying round of the UEFA Champions League.

=== Persepolis ===
On 17 July 2012, aged nearly 37, Nilson signed a two-year deal with Iranian club Persepolis FC. He helped his new team to finish second in 2013–14 and thus qualify for the AFC Champions League, keeping a Pro League-best 18 clean sheets.

Nilson extended his contract for another year on 24 May 2014, but was released in January 2015.

=== Later career ===
On 10 July 2015, Nilson returned to Portugal with Moreirense FC. For the following campaign, still in that country but in the second tier, he joined C.F. União.

== International career ==
Nilson played for Brazil at under-20 level, and was part of the squad that finished runners-up in the 1995 FIFA World Youth Championship although he did not play. In late May 2011, he was invited by Portuguese coach Paulo Duarte to represent the Burkinabé national team, with the nation risking sanctions due to FIFA eligibility rules if he was selected; the following month, the player announced that he would no longer be eligible since a possible call up to the 2012 Africa Cup of Nations would have negative impact in his Vitória Guimarães career.

== Coaching career ==
After retiring, Nilson worked as a coach, mainly in the state of Pernambuco and in amateur football. In quick succession, he was in charge of Flamengo Esporte Clube de Arcoverde, Sociedade Esportiva Ypiranga Futebol Clube, Sociedade Esportiva Decisão Futebol Clube, Vera Cruz Futebol Clube, Retrô Futebol Clube Brasil, Central Sport Club, Associação Cultural e Desportiva Potiguar and Associação Atlética Maguary.

Nilson returned to Portugal on 9 January 2026, being appointed at Campeonato de Portugal club Oliveira do Hospital.

== Career statistics ==
Club performance			League		Cup		League Cup		Continental		Total	
Season	Club	League	Apps	Goals	Apps	Goals	Apps	Goals	Apps	Goals	Apps	Goals
Portugal			League		Taça de Portugal		Taça da Liga		Europe		Total	
2005–06	Vitória Guimarães	Primeira Liga	27	0	1	0	–	–	2	0	30	0
2006–07	Vitória Guimarães	Segunda Liga	28	0	0	0	–	–	–	–	28	0
2007–08	Vitória Guimarães	Primeira Liga	30	0	0	0	2	0	–	–	32	0
2008–09	Vitória Guimarães	Primeira Liga	24	0	2	0	2	0	4	0	32	0
2009–10	Vitória Guimarães	Primeira Liga	29	0	3	0	1	0	–	–	33	0
2010–11	Vitória Guimarães	Primeira Liga	30	0	6	0	1	0	–	–	37	0
2011–12	Vitória Guimarães	Primeira Liga	28	0	2	0	0	0	4	0	35^{1}	0
Iran			League		Hazfi Cup		League Cup		Asia		Total	
2012–13	Persepolis	Pro League	28	0	5	0	–	–	–	–	33	0
2013–14	Persepolis	Pro League	30	0	1	0	–	–	–	–	31	0
2014–15	Persepolis	Pro League	9	0	0	0	–	–	0	0	9	0
Total	Portugal		196	0	14	0	6	0	10	0	226^{1}	0
Total	Iran		68	0	6	0	–	–	0	0	74	0
Career total			264	0	19	0	7	0	10	0	300	0

^{1} includes appearance in the 2011 Supertaça Cândido de Oliveira

== Honours ==
Vitória

- Campeonato Baiano: 1996, 1997
- Campeonato do Nordeste: 1997

Náutico

- Campeonato Pernambucano: 2004

Vitória Guimarães

- Taça de Portugal runner-up: 2010–11

Persepolis

- Iranian Hazfi Cup runner-up: 2012–13
