= Marko Šćepanović =

Montenegrin footballer

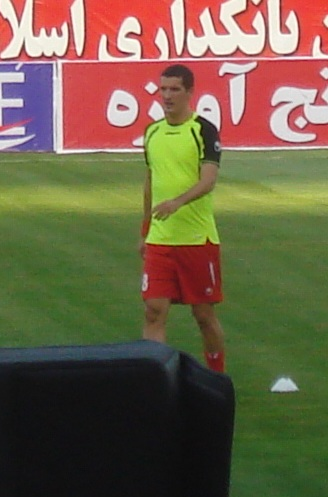

Personal information
- Date of birth: 8 August 1982 (age 44)
- Place of birth: Titograd, SR Montenegro, SFR Yugoslavia
- Height: 1.90 m (6 ft 3 in)
- Position: Midfielder

Senior career*
Years	Team	Apps	(Gls)
1999–2002	Iskra Danilovgrad	62	(8)
2007–2009	Budućnost Podgorica	45	(5)
2009–2010	Mladost Podgorica	18	(2)
2010–2011	Barcsi	14	(5)
2011–2012	Pécsi MFC	32	(2)
2012–2013	Mladost Podgorica	28	(14)
2013–2014	Persepolis	1	(0)
2014–2016	Mladost Podgorica	55	(24)
2016	Kukësi	0	(0)
2016–2017	Iskra Danilovgrad	17	(1)
2017–2018	Mladost Lješkopolje	0	(0)
- * Club domestic league appearances and goals as of 4 June 2016

Marko Šćepanović (born 8 August 1982) is a Montenegrin retired footballer. He scored 14 goals in 28 matches in Montenegrin First League 2012–13.

== Club career ==
=== Persepolis ===
He came to Iran on 1 July 2013 and also trained with the team for three days and participated in a friendly match with Persepolis shirt. Finally he joined Persepolis on 4 July.

=== Club statistics ===
As of 23 August 2013

Club	Division	Season	League		Hazfi Cup		Asia		Total	
Club	Division	Season	Apps	Goals	Apps	Goals	Apps	Goals	Apps	Goals
Persepolis	Pro League	2013–14	1	0	0	0	–	–	1	0
Career Totals			1	0	0	0	0	0	1	0

- Assist Goals

Season	Team	Assists
13–14	Persepolis	0
