= Behzad Gholampour =

Iranian footballer and futsal player

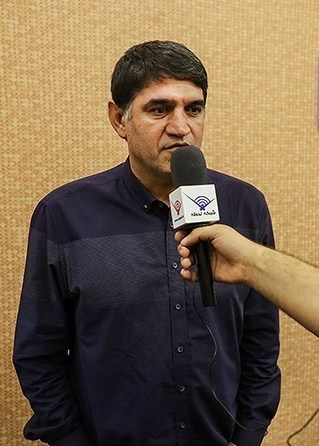

Personal information
- Full name: Behzad Gholampour
- Date of birth: December 23, 1966 (age 59)
- Place of birth: Masjed-Soleyman, Iran
- Height: 1.89 m (6 ft 2 1/2 in)
- Position: Goalkeeper

Team information
- Current team: Esteghlal (goalkeeping coach)

Youth career
- 1990–1992: Pas Tehran

Senior career*
| Years | Team | Apps | (Gls) |
| 1992–1994 | Pas Tehran | | |
| 1994–1998 | Esteghlal | | |
| 1998–2000 | Pas Tehran | | |
| 2000–2004 | Saipa | | |
| 2004–2005 | Pas Tehran | | |
| 2005 | Homa | | |

International career
| 1990–1999 | Iran | 27 | (0) |
| 1992 | Iran futsal | | |

Managerial career
- 2008–2009: Iran (goalkeeping coach)
- 2009–2010: Esteghlal (goalkeeping coach)
- 2011–2013: Rah Ahan (goalkeeping coach)
- 2013–2014: Persepolis (goalkeeping coach)
- 2015–2016: Saba Qom (goalkeeping coach)
- 2016–2017: Naft Tehran (goalkeeping coach)
- 2017–2019: Saipa (goalkeeping coach)
- 2019–2020: Esteghlal (goalkeeping coach)
- 2021–2025: Esteghlal (goalkeeping coach)
- 2025–: Esteghlal (goalkeeping coach)
- * Club domestic league appearances and goals

Behzad Gholampour (Persian: بهزاد غلامپور; born December 23, 1966) is a retired Iranian football and futsal goalkeeper. He was the goalkeeping trainer for Iran national football team from 2008 until late March 2009.

== Honours ==
Pas Tehran

- Asian Club Championship: 1992–93

Iran

- Asian Games: 1990
- Asian Games: 1998
