= Hossein Kanaanizadegan =

Iranian footballer

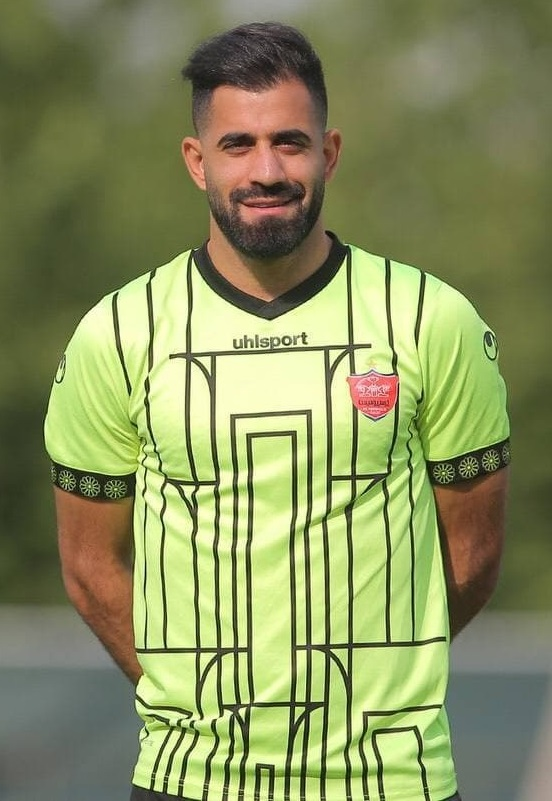
- Kanani Zadegan in Persepolis training in 2021

Personal information
- Full name: Mohammad Hossein Kanaanizadegan
- Date of birth: 23 March 1994 (age 32)
- Place of birth: Bandar-e Mahshahr, Iran
- Height: 1.88 m (6 ft 2 in)
- Positions: Centre back; right back

Team information
- Current team: Persepolis
- Number: 6

Youth career
- 2009–2013: Persepolis

Senior career*
Years	Team	Apps	(Gls)
2011–2016	Persepolis	1	(0)
2013–2014	→ Beira-Mar (loan)	0	(0)
2014–2016	→ Malavan (loan)	48	(4)
2016–2017	Esteghlal	2	(0)
2017–2018	Saipa	7	(1)
2018–2019	Machine Sazi	27	(2)
2019–2021	Persepolis	51	(2)
2021–2023	Al Ahli	41	(7)
2023–	Persepolis	72	(10)

International career^{‡}
2008–2011	Iran U17	25	(3)
2011–2012	Iran U20	19	(1)
2014–2016	Iran U23	5	(1)
2015–	Iran	67	(6)
Medal record
Representing Iran
CAFA Nations Cup
Winner	2023 Kyrgyzstan – Uzbekistan	Team
Runner-up	2025 Tajikistan–Uzbekistan	Team
- * Club domestic league appearances and goals as of 25 October 2026 ‡ National team caps and goals as of 27 June 2026

Mohammad Hossein Kanaanizadegan (Persian: محمدحسین کنعانی‌زادگان; born 23 March 1994), known as Hossein Kanaani, is an Iranian professional footballer who plays as a defender for Persian Gulf Pro League club Persepolis, which he captains, and the Iran national team.

== Club career ==
=== Persepolis ===
He joined Persepolis in January 2012. He signed a 2 1/2-year contract until the end of 2013–14 season with the club. He made his debut for Persepolis as a starter against Foolad in the final fixture of the 2011–12 Iran Pro League. He played for Persepolis U21 in AFC Vision Asia U21 Tehran Premier League.

=== Loan to Beira Mar ===
Kanaani joined Portuguese club Beira Mar on loan in August 2013, but due to work permit issues he returned to Iran without playing a match.

=== Loan to Malavan ===
He joined Malavan on a two–year loan to spend his conscription period in summer 2014. Kanaani scored his first goal for Malavan in a 1–1 draw against Esteghlal.

=== Esteghlal ===
In May 2016, after completing his two–year conscription period at Malavan, it was thought Kanaani would return to his original club, Persepolis. However, Kanaani rejected Persepolis' offer and joined rivals Esteghlal. Shortly after joining the club, Kanaani suffered a season-ending injury after only playing two games. He was released by Esteghlal at the end of the season having only played two games for the club.

=== Saipa ===
He played the 2017–18 season for Saipa FC.

=== Machine Sazi ===
He joined Machine Sazi for the 2018–19 season. He finished the 2018–19 Persian Gulf Pro League at Machine Sazi F.C. with 27 appearances and 1 goal.

=== Persepolis ===
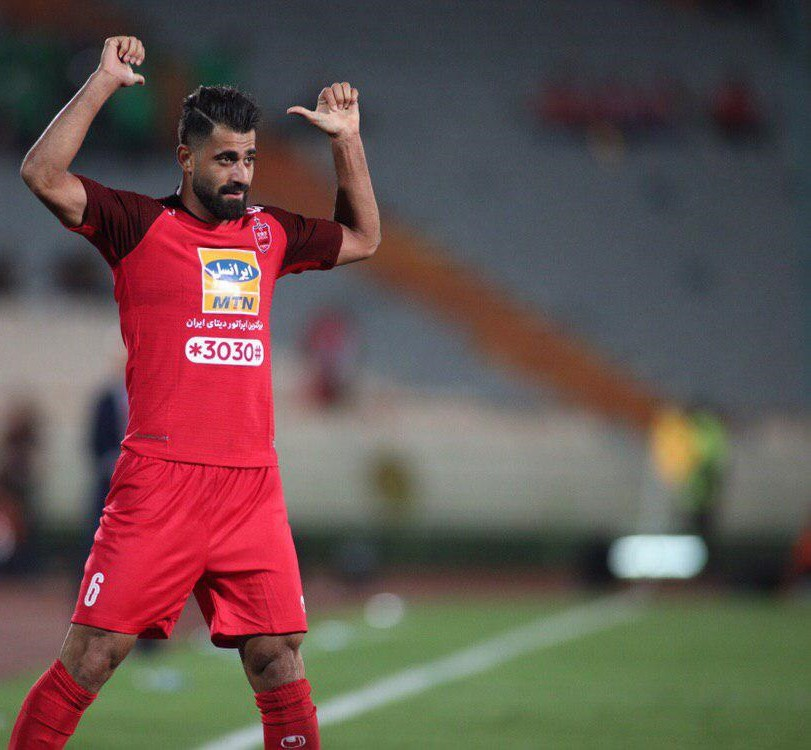
Kanaanizadegan celebrating his goal against Naft Abadan in September 2019

On 7 July 2019, Kanaanizadegan signed a two-year contract with Persian Gulf Pro League champions Persepolis. Kanaanizadegan scored his first goal for Persepolis in a 1–0 victory over Sanat Naft Abadan on 16 September 2019.

=== Al Ahli ===
On 2 August 2021, Kanaanizadegan joined Qatari top flight football club Al Ahli on a two-year deal. His performance in the new team led to new offers from Iran.

=== Return to Persepolis ===
On 8 July 2023, Kanaanizadegan signed a new two-year contract with Persepolis.

== International career ==
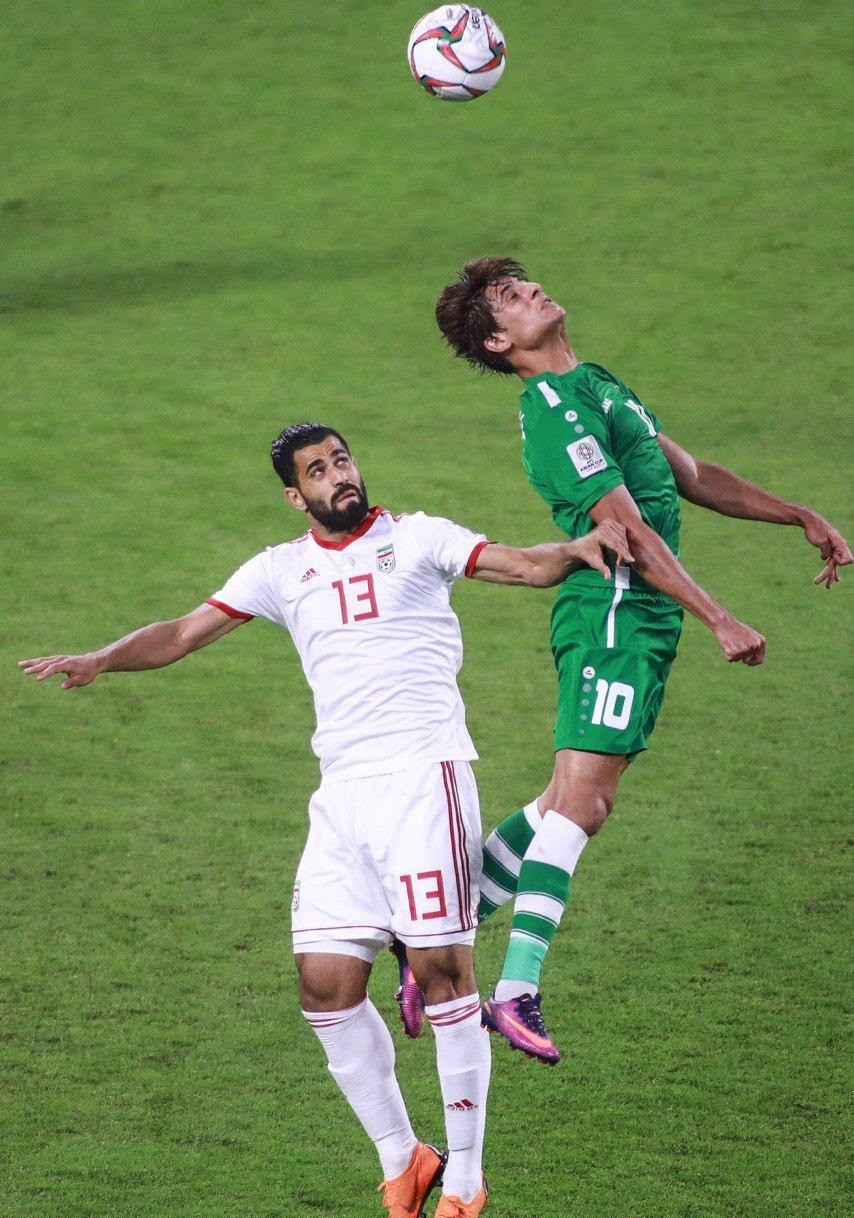
Kanaanizadegan playing for Iran at the 2019 AFC Asian Cup.

=== U17 ===
He played two matches at the 2010 Asian U16 Championships.

=== U20 ===
He started in all four games for the 2012 Asian U19 Championship Qualifiers helping the team keep a clean sheet in all of them. He started in Iran's first game during the championships, helping Team Meli keep a clean sheet as well as hitting the bar from 30 meters out. He was part of Iran U–20 during the 2012 AFC U-19 Championship qualification, 2012 CIS Cup, 2012 AFF U-19 Youth Championship and 2012 AFC U-19 Championship.

=== U23 ===
He was invited to the Iran U-23 training camp by Nelo Vingada in preparation for Incheon 2014 and the 2016 AFC U-22 Championship (Summer Olympic qualification). He was named in the Iran U23 final list for Incheon 2014.

=== Senior ===
Kanaanizadegan made his debut against Uzbekistan in a friendly match on 11 June 2015. He also played against Turkmenistan on 16 June 2015. He scored his first goal for the team with the third goal in the 14–0 thrashing of Cambodia in the 2022 World Cup Qualifiers on 10 October 2019. He scored his second goal for the team with a header against Syria on 30 March 2021. Scored two goals in a friendly against Qatar on the 17th of October, 2023.

On 1 June 2026, he was named in the 26-man squad for the 2026 FIFA World Cup.

== Career statistics ==
=== Club ===
As of 25 October 2026

Club	Division	Season	League		Hazfi Cup		Asia		Super Cup		Total	
Club	Division	Season	Apps	Goals	Apps	Goals	Apps	Goals	Apps	Goals	Apps	Goals
Persepolis	Pro League	2011–12	1	0	0	0	—		—		1	0
Persepolis	Pro League	2012–13	0	0	0	0	—		—		0	0
Persepolis	Pro League	2013–14	0	0	0	0	—		—		0	0
Persepolis	Pro League	2019–20	27	1	3	0	2	0	—		32	1
Persepolis	Pro League	2020–21	24	1	2	0	13	1	1	0	40	2
Persepolis	Pro League	2023–24	26	6	2	0	6	0	—		34	6
Persepolis	Pro League	2024–25	21	3	1	0	6	0	1	0	29	3
Persepolis	Pro League	2025–26	18	1	1	1	—		—		19	3
Persepolis	Pro League	2026–27	7	0	0	0	—		—		7	0
Persepolis	Total		124	12	9	1	27	1	2	0	162	14
Malavan	Pro League	2014–15	19	1	0	0	—		—		19	1
Malavan	Pro League	2015–16	28	2	2	0	—		—		30	2
Malavan	Total		47	3	2	0	—		—		49	3
Esteghlal	Pro League	2016–17	2	0	0	0	0	0	—		2	0
Saipa	Pro League	2017–18	7	3	0	0	—		—		7	3
Machine Sazi	Pro League	2018–19	27	1	2	0	—		—		29	1
Al Ahli	QSL	2021–22	20	1	0	0	—		—		20	1
Al Ahli	QSL	2022–23	21	6	1	0	—		—		22	6
Al Ahli	Total		41	7	1	0	—		—		42	7
Career Total			248	26	14	1	27	1	2	0	291	28

=== International ===
As of match played 27 June 2026

Appearances and goals by national team and year
National team	Year	Apps	Goals
Iran	2015	2	0
Iran	2017	1	0
Iran	2018	3	0
Iran	2019	10	1
Iran	2020	2	0
Iran	2021	10	1
Iran	2022	8	0
Iran	2023	8	2
Iran	2024	13	2
Iran	2025	5	0
Iran	2026	5	0
Total		67	6

Scores and results list Iran's goal tally first.score column indicates score after each Kanaanizadegan goal

No.	Date	Venue	Opponent	Score	Result	Competition
1.	10 October 2019	Azadi Stadium, Tehran, Iran	Cambodia	3–0	14–0	2022 FIFA World Cup qualification
2.	30 March 2021	Azadi Stadium, Tehran, Iran	Syria	1–0	3–0	Friendly
3.	17 October 2023	Amman International Stadium, Amman	Qatar	1–0	4–0	2023 Jordan International Tournament
4.	17 October 2023	Amman International Stadium, Amman	Qatar	4–0	4–0	2023 Jordan International Tournament
5.	21 March 2024	Azadi Stadium, Tehran	Turkmenistan	1–0	5–0	2026 FIFA World Cup qualification
6.	21 March 2024	Azadi Stadium, Tehran	Turkmenistan	3–0	5–0	2026 FIFA World Cup qualification

==== Under-20 ====
International U-20 goals
1	3 November 2012	Ras al-Khaimah, United Arab Emirates	Japan	2–0	Win	2012 AFC U-19 Championship

== Honours ==
Persepolis

- Persian Gulf Pro League (3): 2019–20, 2020–21, 2023–24
- Hazfi Cup: Runner-up 2012–13
- Iranian Super Cup (2): 2019, 2020
- AFC Champions League runner-up: 2020

== Personal life ==
Due to his long and difficult surname, he is often known as "Kanaani".

During the Mahsa Amini protests, Kanaanizadegan supported fellow footballer Amir Reza Nasr Azadani, who was jailed as a result of the protests, by posting a picture of the latter with calls for the authorities to not execute Azadani.
