= Ghasem Dehnavi =

Iranian football player

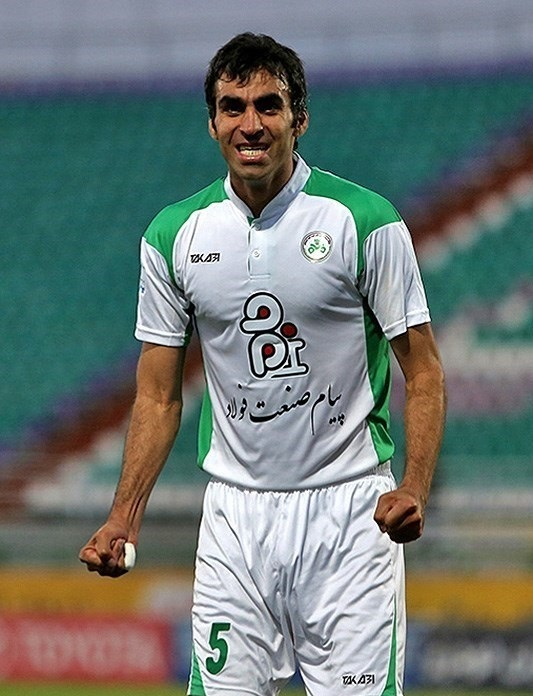
- Dehnavi with Persepolis in 2013

Personal information
- Full name: Abdul Ghasem Dehnavi
- Date of birth: March 21, 1981 (age 45)
- Place of birth: Mashhad, Iran
- Height: 1.82 m (5 ft 11 1/2 in)
- Position: Midfielder

Youth career
- 2000–2003: Shahrdari Mashhad

Senior career*
Years	Team	Apps	(Gls)
2003–2006	Bargh Shiraz	1	(0)
2006–2007	Homa	10	(0)
2007–2009	Mes Rafsanjan	43	(8)
2009–2012	Mes Kerman	81	(20)
2012–2013	Tractor Sazi	31	(2)
2013–2014	Persepolis	23	(1)
2014–2015	Zob Ahan	24	(2)
2015	Saba Qom	14	(0)
2016	Khoneh Be Khoneh	12	(0)
2016–2017	Saba Qom	20	(1)

International career^{‡}
2012	Iran	6	(3)
- * Club domestic league appearances and goals as of July 23, 2015 ‡ National team caps and goals as of December 15, 2012

Ghasem Dehnavi (born March 21, 1981, in Mashhad, Iran) is a retired Iranian football player. He usually played as a defensive midfielder.

== Club career ==
Dehnavi joined Mes Kerman in 2009 from Mes Rafsanjan. After spending three seasons at Mes, he moved to Tractor Sazi. He signed a two-years contract with Persepolis on 3 July 2013 and is used as a defensive midfielder. In June 2014, after only one season with Persepolis in which he made only fifteen league appearances, Dehnavi signed with Zob Ahan. On 23 July 2015, he joined Saba Qom on a one-year contract.

=== Club career statistics ===
As of 1 June 2015

Club performance			League		Cup		Continental		Total	
Season	Club	League	Apps	Goals	Apps	Goals	Apps	Goals	Apps	Goals
Iran			League		Hazfi Cup		Asia		Total	
2005–06	Bargh	IPL	1	0			–			
2006–07	Homa	Div 1	10	0			–			
2007–08	Mes Rafsanjan	Div 1	20	5			–			
2008–09	Mes Rafsanjan	Div 1	23	3			–			
2009–10	Mes	IPL	25	1			6	0		
2010–11	Mes	IPL	31	10	1	0	–		32	10
2011–12	Mes	IPL	25	9	0	0	–		25	9
2012–13	Tractor Sazi	IPL	31	2	1	0	4	0	36	2
2013–14	Persepolis	IPL	15	1	1	0	–		16	1
2014–15	Zob Ahan	IPL	24	2	4	2	–		28	4
Career total			205	32			10	0		

- Assist Goals

Season	Team	Assists
09–10	Mes	6
10–11	Mes	5
11–12	Mes	4
12–13	Tractor Sazi	7
13–14	Persepolis	0
14–15	Zob Ahan	3

== International career ==
He made his debut against Mauritania in April 2012 under Carlos Queiroz.

=== International goals ===
Scores and results list Iran's goal tally first.

#	Date	Venue	Opponent	Score	Result	Competition
1	May 2, 2012	Enghelab Stadium	Mozambique	2–0	3–0	Friendly
2	November 6, 2012	Azadi Stadium	Tajikistan	1–0	6–1	Friendly
3	November 6, 2012	Azadi Stadium	Tajikistan	3–0	6–1	Friendly

== Honours ==
=== Club ===
Zob Ahan

- Hazfi Cup (1): 2014–15
