= Rouhollah Arab =

Iranian footballer (born 1984)

Personal information
- Full name: Rouhollah Arab
- Date of birth: 1 February 1984 (age 42)
- Place of birth: Sari, Iran
- Height: 1.81 m (5 ft 11 in)
- Position: Striker

Team information
- Current team: Aluminium Arak
- Number: 32

Youth career
- 1995–1999: Nassaji Mazandaran

Senior career*
Years	Team	Apps	(Gls)
1999–2007	Nassaji Mazandaran	210	(45)
2007–2013	Sanat Naft	116	(33)
2013–2014	Zob Ahan	12	(1)
2015	Malavan	1	(0)
2015–	Aluminium Arak	10	(3)
- * Club domestic league appearances and goals as of 30 December 2015

Rouhollah Arab (Persian: روح الله عرب, born February 1, 1984) is an Iranian footballer who plays as a striker for Aluminium Arak in the Azadegan League.

== Club career ==
=== Club Career Statistics ===
- Last Update: 10 May 2013

Club performance			League		Cup		Continental		Total	
Season	Club	League	Apps	Goals	Apps	Goals	Apps	Goals	Apps	Goals
Iran			League		Hazfi Cup		Asia		Total	
2007–08	Sanat Naft	Iran Pro League	6	1	0	0	–	–	6	1
2008–09	Sanat Naft	Division 1	19	9	1	0	–	–	20	9
2009–10	Sanat Naft	Division 1	22	7	0	0	–	–	22	7
2010–11	Sanat Naft	Iran Pro League	30	13	0	0	–	–	30	13
2011–12	Sanat Naft	Iran Pro League	8	3	0	0	–	–	8	3
2012–13	Sanat Naft	Iran Pro League	31	9	1	0	–	–	32	9
2013–14	Zob Ahan	Iran Pro League	0	0	0	0	–	–	0	0
Career total			116	33	3	0	–	–	119	33

- Assists

Season	Team	Assists
07–08	Sanat Naft	1
10–11	Sanat Naft	6
11–12	Sanat Naft	1
12–13	Sanat Naft	2
13–14	Zob Ahan	0

== Honours ==
=== Club ===
- Azadegan League
  - Runner up: 1
    - 2009–10 with Sanat Naft
