= Tooraj Haghverdi =

Iranian football referee (born 1973)

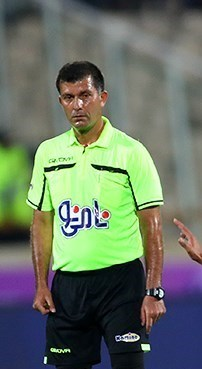
- Born: January 7, 1973 (age 53)

Domestic
Years	League	Role
2005–2018	Iran Pro League	Referee

Tooraj Haghverdi (Persian: تورج حق‌وردی) (born January 7, 1973) is an Iranian football referee.
