= 2015–16 Persepolis F.C. season =

Persepolis
2015–16 season
- Chairman: Ali Akbar Taheri
- Manager: Branko Ivanković
- Stadium: Azadi Stadium
- Persian Gulf Pro League: 2nd
- Hazfi Cup: Quarter-finals
- Top goalscorer: League: Mehdi Taremi (16 goals); All: Mehdi Taremi (18 goals)
- Highest home attendance: 100,000 v Rah Ahan Yazdan (12 May 2016)
- Lowest home attendance: 4,000 v Gostaresh Foulad (14 December 2015)
- Average home league attendance: 30,850
| Home colours | Away colours | Third colours |

The 2015–16 season was the Persepolis's 15th season in the Pro League, and their 33rd consecutive season in the top division of Iranian Football. They were also competing in the Hazfi Cup. Persepolis is captained by Alireza Noormohammadi.

The season was affected by the death of captain Hadi Norouzi, aged 30, on 1 October from heart failure, being given the armband only at the start of the season. The news came as a big shock to Persepolis and Iranian football. A memorial was held at Azadi Stadium on 2 October which was attended by 20,000 mourners. His body was kept at the stadium for one day and then was transferred to Babol. His funeral was held on the following day and he was buried at his hometown, Kapur Chal village at Babol.

== Key events ==
- In the morning of 1 October 2015, Persepolis team manager Mahmoud Khordbin announced that the club captain Hadi Norouzi died in his sleep from a heart attack due to hypertrophic cardiomyopathy. Resuscitation attempts on the way to the hospital failed.

== Squad ==
=== First team squad ===
| No. | Name | Age | Nationality | Position (s) | Since | App | Goals | Assist | Ends | Signed from | Transfer fee | Notes |
Goalkeepers
| 1 | Sosha Makani | 29 | (Iran) | GK | 2014 | 46 | 0 | 0 | 2016 | Foolad | Free | |
| 12 | Morteza Ghadimipour | 21 | (Iran) | GK | 2014 | 1 | 0 | 0 | 2020 | Parseh | Free | U-23; Academy graduated |
| 30 | Ali Mohsenzadeh | 22 | (Iran) | GK | 2016 | 0 | 0 | 0 | 2018 | Naft Tehran | Free | U-23; Academy graduated |
| 55 | Aleksandr Lobanov | 29 | (Uzbekistan) | GK | 2016 | 0 | 0 | 0 | 2017 | (Uzbekistan) Pakhtakor Tashkent | Free | |
Defenders
| 3 | Vahid Heydarieh | 22 | (Iran) | LB / LM | 2015 | 2 | 0 | 0 | 2018 | Paykan | Free | U-23 |
| 4 | Michael Umaña | 33 | (Costa Rica) | CB / RB / DM | 2014 | 42 | 0 | 0 | 2016 | (Costa Rica) Saprissa | Free | |
| 6 | Mohsen Bengar | 36 | (Iran) | CB | 2012 | 104 | 3 | 3 | 2016 | Sepahan | Free | 2nd Vice captain |
| 15 | Mohammad Ansari | 24 | (Iran) | LB / CB / DM | 2015 | 15 | 0 | 1 | 2017 | Shahrdar Tabriz | Free | |
| 20 | Alireza Nourmohammadi | 34 | (Iran) | CB / LB | 2010 | 148 | 8 | 1 | 2016 | Rah Ahan | Free | Vice captain |
| 23 | Luka Marić | 28 | (Croatia) | CB / RB | 2015 | 9 | 0 | 0 | 2016 | (Poland) Zawisza | Free | |
| 27 | Ramin Rezaeian | 25 | (Iran) | RB / RM / RW | 2015 | 19 | 2 | 1 | 2017 | Rah Ahan | Free | |
| 40 | Babak Hatami | 29 | (Iran) | RB / RM / LB / CB | 2015 | 27 | 0 | 2 | 2016 | Saipa | R2 B | |
| 44 | Amir Abbas Ayenechi | 21 | (Iran) | LB / LM / LW | 2016 | 0 | 0 | 0 | 2019 | Free agent | Free | U-23 originally from Academy |
Midfielders
| 8 | Ahmad Nourollahi | 22 | (Iran) | DM / CM | 2014 | 47 | 1 | 2 | 2017 | Foolad Yazd | Free | U-23 |
| 10 | Farshad Ahmadzadeh | 23 | (Iran) | AM / LW / RW / SS | 2012 | 19 | 1 | 2 | 2017 | Parseh | Free | Academy graduated |
| 11 | Kamal Kamyabinia | 26 | (Iran) | CM / AM / RM / LM | 2015 | 19 | 0 | 0 | 2017 | Naft Tehran | Free | |
| 18 | Mehrdad Kafshgari | 28 | (Iran) | DM / CM | 2013 | 58 | 1 | 2 | 2016 | Rah Ahan | Free | |
| 19 | Milad Kamandani | 21 | (Iran) | AM / CM / RM | 2013 | 18 | 1 | 1 | 2016 | Moghavemat Tehran | R600 M | U-23; Academy graduated |
| 29 | Mohammad Rahmati | 21 | (Iran) | CM / DM | 2015 | 0 | 0 | 0 | 2020 | Academy | Free | U-23; Academy graduated |
| 77 | Mohsen Mosalman | 24 | (Iran) | AM / LW / RW / CM | 2015 | 26 | 2 | 4 | 2017 | Zob Ahan | R2.7 B | |
Forwards
| 2 | Omid Alishah | 23 | (Iran) | LW / RW / LM / RM | 2013 | 68 | 10 | 5 | 2016 | Rah Ahan | Free | |
| 9 | Mehdi Taremi | 23 | (Iran) | CF / LW / RW / AM | 2014 | 53 | 21 | 7 | 2016 | Iranjavan | Free | |
| 14 | Jerry Bengtson | 28 | (Honduras) | CF / SS / AM | 2015 | 11 | 4 | 0 | 2016 | (United States) New England | Free | |
| 16 | Reza Khaleghifar | 32 | (Iran) | CF / SS / RW / LW / AM | 2014 | 22 | 0 | 1 | 2016 | Rah Ahan | Free | |
| 22 | Shahab Zahedi | 20 | (Iran) | LW / RW / CF | 2014 | 5 | 0 | 0 | 2015 | Paykan | Free | U-21; Academy player |
| 70 | Ali Alipour | 20 | (Iran) | CF / RW / LW | 2015 | 35 | 4 | 4 | 2017 | Rah Ahan | Free | U-21 |
Players left the club during the season
| 24 | Hadi Norouzi | 30 | (Iran) | SS / RW / LW / ST | 2008 | 201 | 35 | 27 | Died | | | |
| 17 | Ali Fatemi | 22 | (Iran) | RW / LW / CF / SS | 2014 | 2 | 0 | 0 | 2017 | On loan at Rah Ahan Yazdan | | |
| 88 | Iman Sadeghi | 23 | (Iran) | GK | 2015 | 7 | -9 | 0 | Transferred to Khouneh Be Khouneh | | | |

Apps and goals updated as of 31 December 2015
For more on the reserve and academy squads, see Persepolis Novin, Persepolis Academy, Persepolis Shomal & Persepolis Qaem Shahr.
Source: fc-perspolis.com, FFIRI.IR

==== Iran Pro League squad ====
Updated 29 July 2015.

Note: Flags indicate national team as defined under FIFA eligibility rules; some limited exceptions apply. Players may hold more than one non-FIFA nationality.

| No. | Pos. | Nation | Player |
|---|---|---|---|
| 1 | GK | IRI | Sosha Makani |
| 2 | MF | IRI | Omid Alishah (3rd captain) |
| 3 | DF | IRI | Vahid Heydarieh ^{U23} |
| 4 | DF | CRC | Michael Umaña |
| 6 | DF | IRI | Mohsen Bengar (Vice captain) |
| 8 | MF | IRI | Ahmad Nourollahi ^{U23} |
| 9 | FW | IRI | Mehdi Taremi |
| 10 | MF | IRI | Farshad Ahmadzadeh |
| 11 | MF | IRI | Kamal Kamyabinia |
| 12 | GK | IRI | Morteza Ghadimipour ^{U23} |
| 14 | FW | HON | Jerry Bengtson |
| 15 | DF | IRI | Mohammad Ansari |
| 16 | MF | IRI | Reza Khaleghifar |
| 18 | MF | IRI | Mehrdad Kafshgari |

| No. | Pos. | Nation | Player |
|---|---|---|---|
| 19 | MF | IRI | Milad Kamandani ^{U23} |
| 20 | DF | IRI | Alireza Nourmohammadi (Captain) |
| 22 | FW | IRI | Shahab Zahedi ^{U21} |
| 23 | DF | CRO | Luka Marić |
| 27 | DF | IRI | Ramin Rezaeian |
| 29 | MF | IRI | Mohammad Rahmati ^{U23} |
| 30 | GK | IRI | Ali Mohsenzadeh ^{U23} |
| 40 | DF | IRI | Babak Hatami |
| 44 | DF | IRI | Amir Abbas Ayenechi ^{U23} |
| 55 | GK | UZB | Aleksandr Lobanov |
| 70 | FW | IRI | Ali Alipour ^{U21} |
| 77 | MF | IRI | Mohsen Mosalman |

- U21 = Under 21 Player
- U23 = Under 23 Player

==== Out on loan ====
Note: Flags indicate national team as defined under FIFA eligibility rules; some limited exceptions apply. Players may hold more than one non-FIFA nationality.

| No. | Pos. | Nation | Player |
|---|---|---|---|
| 5 | DF | IRI | Hossein Kanaani ^{U23} (at Malavan for the season) |
| 13 | DF | IRI | Hossein Mahini (at Malavan for the season) |
| 17 | FW | IRI | Ali Fatemi ^{U23} (at Rahahan for the season) |

For recent transfers, see List of Iranian football transfers summer 2015.
For more on the reserve and academy squads, see Persepolis Novin, Persepolis Academy, Persepolis Shomal & Persepolis Qaem Shahr.

== New Contracts ==
| No | P | Name | Age | Contract length | Contract ends | Date | Source |
|---|---|---|---|---|---|---|---|
| 20 | CB | Alireza Nourmohammadi | 33 | One season | 2016 | 20 June 2015 | |
| 24 | RW | Hadi Norouzi | 29 | One season | 2016 | 27 June 2015 | |
| 2 | LW | Omid Alishah | 23 | One season | 2016 | 30 June 2015 | |
| 8 | DM | Ahmad Nourollahi | 22 | 2 season | 2017 | 1 July 2015 | |
| 9 | CF | Mehdi Taremi | 22 | One season | 2016 | 1 July 2015 | |
| 16 | SS | Reza Khaleghifar | 31 | 2 season | 2017 | 2 July 2015 | |

== Transfers ==
=== In ===
| No | P | Name | Age | Moving from | Ends | Transfer fee | Type | Transfer window | Quota | Source |
|---|---|---|---|---|---|---|---|---|---|---|
| 10 | AM | Farshad Ahmadzadeh | 23 | Tractor Sazi | 2017 | — | Loan return | Summer | | |
| 11 | CM | Kamal Kamyabinia | 25 | Naft Tehran | 2017 | — | Free Transfer | Summer | PL | |
| 27 | RB | Ramin Rezaeian | 25 | Rah Ahan | 2017 | — | Free Transfer | Summer | PL | |
| 23 | CB | (Croatia) Luka Maric | 28 | Zawisza (Poland) | 2016 | — | Free Transfer | Summer | | |
| 77 | AM | Mohsen Mosalman | 24 | Zob Ahan | 2017 | R2.7 B | Transfer | Summer | PL | |
| 3 | LB | Vahid Heydarieh | 22 | Paykan | 2018 | — | Free Transfer | Summer | PL | |
| 15 | LB | Mohammad Ansari | 23 | Shahrdari Tabriz | 2017 | — | Free Transfer | Summer | | |
| 88 | GK | Iman Sadeghi | 23 | Malavan | 2018 | — | Free Transfer | Summer | PL | |
| 17 | RW | Ali Fatemi | 21 | Free agent | 2017 | — | Free Transfer | Summer | | |
| 14 | CF | (Honduras) Jerry Bengtson | 28 | New England (United States) | 2016 | — | Free Transfer | Summer | FA | |
| 44 | CB | Amir Abbas Ayenechi | 22 | Free agent | 2019 | — | Free Transfer | Winter | | |
| 30 | GK | Ali Mohsenzadeh | 22 | Naft Tehran | 2018 | — | Free Transfer | Winter | | |
| 55 | GK | (Uzbekistan) Aleksandr Lobanov | 30 | Pakhtakor (Uzbekistan) | 2017 | — | Free Transfer | Winter | | |

=== Out ===
| No | P | Name | Age | Moving to | Transfer fee | Type | Transfer window | Source |
|---|---|---|---|---|---|---|---|---|
| 22 | CF | (Brazil) Tadeu | 28 | (Brazil) Boa Esporte | Free | Transfer | Summer | |
| 5 | RB | Mehdi Jafarpour | 31 | Rah Ahan | — | Free Transfer | Summer | |
| 8 | RW | Mehdi Daghagheleh | 26 | Foolad | Free | Transfer | Summer | |
| 29 | LB | Navid Sabouri | 19 | Shahrdari Ardabil | — | Free Transfer | Summer | |
| 21 | CM | Ali Astani | 18 | Shahrdari Ardabil | — | Free Transfer | Summer | |
| 10 | CF | Reza Norouzi | 32 | Saipa | — | Free Transfer | Summer | |
| 26 | RM | Hamidreza Aliasgari | 25 | Rah Ahan | — | Free Transfer | Summer | |
| 11 | SS | Payam Sadeghian | 23 | Naft Tehran | — | Free Transfer | Summer | |
| 15 | CM | Afshin Esmaeilzadeh | 23 | Mes Kerman | — | Free Transfer | Summer | |
| 66 | MF | (Brazil) Fernando Gabriel | 27 | (Saudi Arabia) Al-Faisaly | — | Free Transfer | Summer | |
| 14 | AM | Mohammad Nouri | 32 | (Qatar) Al-Mesaimeer | — | Free Transfer | Summer | |
| 3 | CB | Mohammadreza Khanzadeh | 24 | Foolad | — | Free Transfer | Summer | |
| 30 | LB | Mobin Mirdoraghi | 22 | Esteghlal Ahvaz | Free | Transfer | Summer | |
| 33 | CF | Mohammad Abbaszadeh | 25 | Released | | | Summer | |
| 44 | GK | Masoud Homami | 32 | Pas Hamedan | Free | Transfer | Summer | |
| 35 | FW | Amir Mohammad Madani | 20 | Rahahan | Free | Transfer | winter | |
| 17 | FW | Ali Fatemi | 22 | Rahahan | Free | Loan | winter | |
| 88 | GK | Iman Sadeghi | 23 | Khoneh Be Khoneh | R2.0 B | Transfer | winter | |

=== Technical staff ===
| Position | Staff |
|---|---|
| Head coach | (Croatia) Branko Ivanković |
| Assistant coach | (Croatia) Andrej Panadić |
| First-team coach | (Iran) Karim Bagheri |
| First-team coach | (Iran) Mostafa Ghanbarpour |
| Physical fitness trainer | (Croatia) Marko Stilinovic |
| Goalkeeping coach | (Croatia) Igor Panadić |
| Doctor | (Iran) Dr. Alireza Haghighat |
| Team Manager | (Iran) Mahmoud Khordbin |
| Media Officer | (Iran) Pendar Khomarlou |

== Competitions ==
=== Overview ===
| Competition | First match | Last match | Starting round | Final position | Record | | | | | | | |
| Competition | First match | Last match | Starting round | Final position | Pld | W | D | L | GF | GA | GD | Win % |
|---|---|---|---|---|---|---|---|---|---|---|---|---|
| PGPL | 31 July 2015 | 13 May 2016 | Matchday 1 | Runners-up | 30 | 16 | 9 | 5 | 50 | 34 | +16 | 53.33 |
| Hazfi Cup | 12 September 2015 | 4 November 2015 | Round of 32 | Quarter-Final | 3 | 2 | 0 | 1 | 2 | 2 | +0 | 66.67 |
| Total | | | | | 33 | 18 | 9 | 6 | 52 | 36 | +16 | 54.55 |

Source: Competitions

=== Persian Gulf Pro League ===
==== Standings ====
| Pos | Team | Pld | W | D | L | GF | GA | GD | Pts | Qualification or relegation |
|---|---|---|---|---|---|---|---|---|---|---|
| 1 | Est. Khuzestan (C) | 30 | 15 | 12 | 3 | 33 | 14 | +19 | 57 | Qualification for the 2017 AFC Champions League group stage |
| 2 | Persepolis | 30 | 16 | 9 | 5 | 50 | 34 | +16 | 57 | Qualification for the 2017 AFC Champions League group stage |
| 3 | Esteghlal | 30 | 13 | 13 | 4 | 43 | 28 | +15 | 52 | Qualification for the 2017 AFC Champions League qualifying play-offs |
| 4 | Tractor Sazi | 30 | 13 | 12 | 5 | 43 | 27 | +16 | 51 | |
| 5 | Naft Tehran | 30 | 13 | 10 | 7 | 30 | 21 | +9 | 49 | |

Updated to match(es) played on 13 May 2016. Source: IPL Stats
Rules for classification: 1) points; 2) goal difference; 3) number of goals scored.
(C) Champions

==== Results summary ====
| Overall | | | | | | | | Home | | | | | | Away | | | | | |
| Pld | W | D | L | GF | GA | GD | Pts | W | D | L | GF | GA | GD | W | D | L | GF | GA | GD |
|---|---|---|---|---|---|---|---|---|---|---|---|---|---|---|---|---|---|---|---|
| 30 | 16 | 9 | 5 | 50 | 34 | +16 | 57 | 8 | 4 | 3 | 24 | 17 | +7 | 8 | 5 | 2 | 26 | 17 | +9 |

Last updated: 13 May 2016.
Source: Ipl Stats

==== Results by round ====
| Round | 1 | 2 | 3 | 4 | 5 | 6 | 7 | 8 | 9 | 10 | 11 | 12 | 13 | 14 | 15 | 16 | 17 | 18 | 19 | 20 | 21 | 22 | 23 | 24 | 25 | 26 | 27 | 28 | 29 | 30 |
|---|---|---|---|---|---|---|---|---|---|---|---|---|---|---|---|---|---|---|---|---|---|---|---|---|---|---|---|---|---|---|
| Ground | H | A | A | H | A | H | A | H | A | H | A | H | A | H | A | A | H | H | A | H | A | H | A | H | A | H | A | H | A | H |
| Result | D | L | L | L | W | L | W | D | W | W | D | W | D | W | W | D | W | D | D | W | D | D | W | W | W | W | W | L | W | W |
| Position | 6 | 12 | 16 | 16 | 14 | 14 | 11 | 12 | 11 | 7 | 9 | 7 | 8 | 6 | 4 | 6 | 5 | 5 | 4 | 3 | 3 | 4 | 3 | 3 | 3 | 1 | 1 | 3 | 2 | 2 |

Updated to match(es) played on 8 May 2016. Source: "Ipl".
A = Away; H = Home; W = Win; D = Draw; L = Loss

==== Matches ====
Win Draw Loss Postponed

| Date Round | Home | Score | Away | Location |

| 31 July 2015 1 | Persepolis | 2 – 2 | Padideh | Tehran |
| 19:35 DST+03:30 | A. Alipour 7'; K. Kamyabinia (yellow card) 11'; H. Norouzi 39' (yellow card) 72' | Stats; Live TV: IRIB TV3 / Jame Jam 2 | Shakeri 14'; Badamaki 17' | Stadium: Azadi Stadium; Attendance: 18,000; Referee: Yadollah Jahanbazi |

| 6 August 2015 2 | Esteghlal Khuzestan | 2 – 1 | Persepolis | Ahvaz |
| 19:30 DST+03:30 | E. Ferreira (yellow card) 36'; P. Shirzadi (yellow card) 44'; H. Beyt Saeed 48', 58' | Stats; Live TV: IRIB TV3 / Jame Jam 2 | B. Hatami (yellow card) 15'; M. Taremi (yellow card) 66' (goal) 88'; H. Norouzi (red card) 68' | Stadium: Ghadir Stadium; Attendance: 6,000; Referee: Mohsen Torki |

| 13 August 2015 3 | Sepahan | 4 – 2 | Persepolis | Fooladshahr |
| 19:25 DST+03:30 | E. Hajsafi 8'; A. Karimi (yellow card) 36'; M. Khalatbari (yellow card) 36' (goal) 81'; M. Umaña 40' (o.g.); A. Karami (yellow card) 63'; H. Aghily 67' (pen.) | Stats; Live TV: IRIB TV3 / Jame Jam 2 | A. Alipour (yellow card) 11'; M. Taremi 13'; O. Alishah 33' (yellow card) 88'; K. Kamyabinia (yellow card) 36'; M. Kafashgari (yellow card) 65'; M. Ansari (yellow card) 70' | Stadium: Foolad Shahr Stadium; Attendance: 12,500; Referee: Hossein Zargar |

| 20 August 2015 4 | Persepolis | 1 – 2 | Zob Ahan | Tehran |
| 19:15 DST+03:30 | F. Ahmadzadeh (yellow card) 49'; O. Alishah 64'; M. Bengar (yellow card) 90+2' (yellow-red card) 90+4' | Stats; Live TV: IRIB TV3 / Jame Jam 2 | K. Rezaei 76'; M. Hassanzadeh 90+1' (pen.) | Stadium: Azadi Stadium; Attendance: 25,000; Referee: Alireza Faghani |

| 25 August 2015 5 | Foolad | 0 – 2 | Persepolis | Ahvaz |
| 19:15 DST+03:30 | Y. Vakia (yellow card) 53'; S. Ansari (yellow card) 61' | Stats; Live TV: IRIB TV3 / Jame Jam 2 | M.Taremi 51', 57'; O. Alishah (yellow card) 53'; B. Hatami (yellow card) 71' | Stadium: Ghadir Stadium; Attendance: 13,000; Referee: Yadollah Jahanbazi |

| 16 September 2015 6 | Persepolis | 1 – 2 | Saipa | Tehran |
| 18:35 DST+03:30 | B. Hatami (yellow card) 18'; F. Ahmadzadeh (yellow card) 30'; R. Rezaïan (yellow card) 68'; A. Alipour (yellow card) 79'; Taremi 90+1' (pen.) | Stats; Live TV: IRIB TV3 / Jame Jam 2 | J. Nekounam (yellow card) 25'; H. Fallahzadeh (yellow card) 48'; Norouzi 69' (pen.); Rezaei 80' | Stadium: Azadi Stadium; Attendance: 11,000; Referee: Ahmad Salehi |

| 25 September 2015 7 | Tractor Sazi | 0 – 1 | Persepolis | Tabriz |
| 16:00 DST+03:30 | S. Ashouri (yellow card) 10'; M. Iranpourian (yellow card) 14' | Stats; Live TV: IRIB TV3 / Jame Jam 2 | J. Bengtson (yellow card) 36' (goal) 71' (pen.); O. Alishah (yellow card) 40'; F. Ahmadzadeh (yellow card) 65' | Stadium: Sahand Stadium; Attendance: 20,000; Referee: Mohsen Torki |

| 15 October 2015 8 | Persepolis | 1 – 1 | Saba Qom | Tehran |
| 18:55 DST+03:30 | M. Taremi 85'; A. Nourmohammadi (red card) 90' | Stats | M. Ghazi 21'; S. Aghazamani (yellow card) 45'; A. Sadeghi (yellow card) 50'; F. Bagheri (yellow card) 71'; Gh. Dehnavi (yellow card) 88' (red card) 90' | Stadium: Azadi Stadium; Attendance: 35,000; Referee: Shahin Haji Babaei |

| 20 October 2015 9 | Siah Jamegan Khorasan | 1 – 2 | Persepolis | Mashhad |
| 15:00 DST+03:30 | A. Naghizadeh 82' | Stats | R. Rezaeian 40'; F. Ahmadzadeh 72'; M. Taremi (yellow card) 76' | Stadium: Samen Stadium; Attendance: 18,000; Referee: Ashkan Khorshidi |

| 26 October 2015 10 | Persepolis | 2 – 0 | Malavan | Tehran |
| 17:45 DST+03:30 | O. Alishah (yellow card) 47'; F. Ahmadzadeh (yellow card) 53'; A. Alipour 67'; J. Bengtson 76' | Stats | E. Pourghaz (yellow card) 44'; M. Abshak (yellow card) 55' | Stadium: Azadi Stadium; Attendance: 9,000; Referee: Bijan Heydari |

| 30 October 2015 11 | Esteghlal | 1 – 1 | Perspolis | Tehran |
| 15:00 (DST+03:30) | M. Majidi (yellow card) 42'; J. Ansari 49'; S. Shahbazzadeh (yellow card) 60'; A. Hajmohammadi (yellow card) 82'; O. Ebrahimi (yellow card) 90' | Stats | A. Nourmohammadi (yellow card) 90+1'; J. Bengtson 90+5' | Stadium: Azadi Stadium; Attendance: 90,000; Referee: Mohsen Torki |

| 21 November 2015 12 | Persepolis | 1 – 0 | Esteghlal Ahvaz | Tehran |
| 16:20 DST+03:30 | M. Taremi 20'; K. Kamyabinia (yellow card) 82'; O. Alishah (yellow card) 90' | Stats | H. Bahrami (yellow card) 25'; H. Saki (yellow card) 56' | Stadium: Azadi Stadium; Attendance: 9,000; Referee: Ashkan Khorshidi |

| 30 November 2015 13 | Naft Tehran | 1 – 1 | Persepolis | Tehran |
| 15:00 DST+03:30 | P. Sadeghain (yellow card) 37'; M. Daneshgar 73' (yellow card) 74'; H. Bou Hamdan (yellow card) 81'; I. Mobali (yellow card) 87'; A. Motahari (yellow card) 90+1' | Stats | M. Kamandani 41'; A. Nourollahi (yellow card) 42'; M. Mosalman (yellow card) 58'; A. Alipour (yellow card) 63'; M. Taremi (yellow card) 74'; M. Ansari (yellow card) 78' | Stadium: Takhti Stadium; Attendance: 12,200; Referee: Mohammad Reza Akbarian |

| 14 December 2015 14 | Persepolis | 1 – 0 | Gostaresh Foulad | Tehran |
| 16:20 DST+03:30 | J. Bengtson 35' (yellow card) 35' | Stats | D. Shojaeian (yellow card) 87' | Stadium: Azadi Stadium; Attendance: 4,500; Referee: Touraj Haghverdi |

| 17 December 2015 15 | Rah Ahan | 0 – 2 | Persepolis | Shahr-e Qods |
| 15:15 DST+03:30 | | Stats | F. Ahmadzadeh (yellow card) 14'; M. Taremi 25', 42'; M. Bengar (yellow card) 31' | Stadium: Shahre Qods Stadium; Attendance: 11,800; Referee: Shahin Haji Babaei |

| 28 December 2015 16 | Padideh | 2 – 2 | Persepolis | Mashhad |
| 14:45 DST+03:30 | M. Bayat (yellow card) 17'; H. Badamaki (yellow card) 34'; I. Prahić (yellow card) 49'; M. Kheiri 56' (yellow card) 72'; M. Khamisi 73' (yellow card) 83' | Stats | M. Kamandani (yellow card) 40'; M. Taremi 66'; S. Makani (red card) 85'; R. Rezaïan 90+4' | Stadium: Samen Stadium; Attendance: 18,000; Referee: Reza Kermanshahi |

| 1 January 2016 17 | Persepolis | 2 – 0 | Esteghlal Khuzestan | Tehran |
| 16:30 DST+03:30 | O. Alishah 16'; M. Bengar (yellow card) 23'; M. Taremi 48' | Stats | H. Nassari (yellow card) 24'; D. Mahini (yellow card) 32'; F. Jesus (yellow card) 77' | Stadium: Azadi Stadium; Attendance: 40,000; Referee: Ahmad Salehi |

| 2 February 2016 18 | Persepolis | 2 – 2 | Sepahan | Tehran |
| 17:00 DST+03:30 | A. Alipour 50'; Kamyabinia 74' | | Musaev 10'; Chimba 65' | Stadium: Azadi Stadium |

| 7 February 2016 19 | Zob Ahan | 2 – 2 | Persepolis | Fooladshahr |
| 14:30 DST+03:30 | M. Hassanzadeh 70' (pen.); M. Tabrizi 90+3' | | Alishah 35'; A. Alipour 73' | Stadium: Foolad Shahr Stadium |

| 12 February 2016 20 | Persepolis | 1 – 0 | Foolad | Tehran |
| 17:10 DST+03:30 | M. Taremi 13' | | | Stadium: Azadi Stadium |

| 18 February 2016 21 | Saipa | 1 – 1 | Persepolis | Tehran |
| 16:00 DST+03:30 | Daghagheleh 90+1' | | A. Nourollahi 11' | Stadium: Azadi Stadium |

| 6 March 2016 22 | Persepolis | 1 – 1 | Tractor Sazi | Tehran |
| 17:30 DST+03:30 | R. Rezaeian 13' | | M. Iranpourian 39' | Stadium: Azadi Stadium |

| 11 March 2016 23 | Saba Qom | 0 – 1 | Persepolis | Qom |
| 16:00 DST+03:30 | | | Ahmadzadeh 43' | Stadium: Yadegar-e Emam Stadium; Referee: Ashkan Khorshidi |

| 3 April 2016 24 | Persepolis | 3 – 2 | Siah Jamegan Khorasan | Tehran |
| 17:00 DST+03:30 | M. Taremi 41', 83'; A. Alipour 70' | | H. Karimi 5'; M. Hosseini 62' (pen.) | Stadium: Azadi Stadium |

| 9 April 2016 25 | Malavan | 1 – 2 | Persepolis | Bandar-e Anzali |
| 17:30 DST+03:30 | J. Rafkhaei 10' (pen.) | | J. Bengtson 6' (pen.); Kamiabinia 90+3' | Stadium: Takhti Stadium |

| 15 April 2016 26 | Persepolis | 4 – 2 | Esteghlal | Tehran |
| 17:00 DST+03:30 | M. Taremi 5', 34'; Rezaeian 54'; M. Mosalman 86' | | J. Ansari 55'; O. Ebrahimi 89' (pen.) | Stadium: Azadi Stadium |

| 22 April 2016 27 | Esteghlal Ahvaz | 0 – 2 | Persepolis | Ahvaz |
| 18:10 DST+03:30 | | | J. Bengtson 56', 86' | Stadium: Ghadir Stadium |

| 28 April 2016 28 | Persepolis | 0 – 2 | Naft Tehran | Tehran |
| 18:00 DST+03:30 | | | V. Amiri 84'; Haghdoust 90+3' | Stadium: Azadi Stadium |

| 8 May 2016 29 | Gostaresh Foulad | 2 – 4 | Persepolis | Tabriz |
| 18:00 DST+03:30 | Ebrahimi 56'; D. Shojaeian 87' | | Ahmadzadeh 32'; M. Ansari 42'; O. Alishah 70', 85' | Stadium: Sahand Stadium |

| 13 May 2016 30 | Persepolis | 2 – 1 | Rah Ahan | Tehran |
| 18:00 DST+03:30 | R. Rezaeian 82' (pen.); Nourollahi 85' | | M. Mohammadi 89' | Stadium: Azadi Stadium |

==== Score overview ====
Win Draw Loss

| Opposition | Home score | Away score | Aggregate score |
|---|---|---|---|
| Esteghlal | 4–2 | 1–1 | 5–3 |
| Esteghlal Ahvaz | 1–0 | 0–2 | 3–0 |
| Esteghlal Khuzestan | 2–0 | 1–0 | 2–1 |
| Foolad | 1–0 | 0–2 | 3–0 |
| Gostaresh Foulad | 1–0 | 2–4 | 5–2 |
| Malavan | 2–0 | 1–2 | 4–1 |
| Naft Tehran | 0–2 | 1–1 | 1–3 |
| Padideh | 2–2 | 2–2 | 4–4 |
| Rah Ahan | 2–1 | 0–2 | 4–1 |
| Saba | 1–1 | 0–1 | 2–1 |
| Saipa | 1–2 | 1–1 | 2–3 |
| Sepahan | 2–2 | 4–2 | 4–6 |
| Siah Jamegan | 3–2 | 1–2 | 5–3 |
| Tractor | 1–1 | 0–1 | 1–0 |
| Zob Ahan | 1–2 | 2–2 | 3–4 |

=== Hazfi Cup ===
Win Draw Loss Postponed

| Date Round | Home | Score | Away | Location |

| 12 September 2015 Round of 32 | Persepolis | 1 – 0 | Paykan | Tehran |
| 18:40 DST+03:30 | S. Makani (yellow card) 34'; F. Ahmadzadeh (yellow card) 45'; M. Taremi 68' (pen.); M. Taremi (yellow card) 87' | Report; Live TV: IRIB TV3 / Jame Jam 2 | S. Barani (yellow card) (red card) 83' | Stadium: Azadi Stadium; Attendance: 7000; Referee: Payam Heydari |

| 20 September 2015 Round of 16 | Persepolis | 1 – 0 (a.e.t.) | Malavan | Tehran |
| 18:45 DST+03:30 | M. Taremi (yellow card) 85'; A. Nourollahi (yellow card) 94'; M. Taremi 100'; M. Taremi (yellow card) (red card) 108'; S. Makani (yellow card) 108'; A. Alipour (yellow card) 118'; R. Rezaeian (yellow card) 120' | Report | | Stadium: Azadi Stadium; Attendance: 17000; Referee: Alborz Hajipour |

| 4 November 2015 Quarter-Final | Zob Ahan | 2 – 0 (a.e.t.) | Persepolis | Isfahan |
| 14:30 DST+03:30 | M. Tabrizi (yellow card); M. Tabrizi 108'; R. Shekari 116' | | I. Sadeghi (red card) 23'; M. Mosalman (yellow card) | Stadium: Foolad Shahr Stadium |

=== Friendly Matches ===
==== Pre-season ====
Win Draw Loss Postponed

| Date Round | Home | Score | Away | Location |

| 9 July 2015 | Persepolis | 4 – 0 | Persepolis Qaemshahr | Tehran |
| 18:00 | F. Ahmadzadeh; O. Alishah; M. Taremi | | | Stadium: Derafshifar Stadium |

| 15 July 2015 | (Turkey) Gençlerbirliği | 0 – 0 | Persepolis | Ankara, Turkey |
| 17:00 EEST | | | | Stadium: Gençlerbirliği Training Camp |

| 18 July 2015 | Trinidad and Tobago U23 | 0 – 2 | Persepolis | Kızılcahamam, Turkey |
| 17:00 EEST | | | A. Alipour 50'; M. Kamandani 90' | Stadium: Kizilcahamam Stadi |

| 22 July 2015 | (Turkmenistan) Altyn Asyr | 0 – 5 | Persepolis | Kızılcahamam, Turkey |
| 17:00 EEST | | | A. Alipour 15' 42' 49'; F. Ahmadzadeh 18'; R. Khaleghifar 71' | Stadium: Kizilcahamam Stadi |

==== During season ====
Win Draw Loss Postponed

| Date Round | Home | Score | Away | Location |

| 3 August 2015 | Persepolis | 2 – 1 | Nassaji Mazandaran | Tehran |
| 18:00 DST+03:30 | O. Alishah; F. Ahmadzadeh | | A. Riyahi | Stadium: Derafshifar Stadium |

| 9 August 2015 | Persepolis | 1 – 0 | Mes Kerman | Tehran |
| 18:00 DST+03:30 | O. Alishah | | | Stadium: Derafshifar Stadium |

| 16 August 2015 | Persepolis | 6 – 0 | Persepolis U-21 | Tehran |
| 18:00 DST+03:30 | M.Mosalman; O. Alishah; H.Norouzi; M.Kamandani; A.Alipour | | | Stadium: Derafshifar Stadium |

| 5 September 2015 | Persepolis | 3 – 0 | Bahman javan | Tehran |
| 17:00 DST+03:30 | K.Kamyabinia; B.Hatami; A.Fatemi | | | Stadium: Derafshifar Stadium |

| 26 March 2016 | (Oman) Al Oruba | 4 – 6 | Persepolis | Sur, Oman |
| 17:00 DST+03:30 | | | Alipour; B.Hatami; Jerry Bengtson | Stadium: Sur Sports Complex |

| 28 March 2016 | (Oman) Al Seeb | 0 – 1 | Persepolis | Muscat, Oman |
| 19:30 DST+03:30 | | | | Stadium: Sultan Qaboos Sports Complex |

== Statistics ==
=== Appearances and goals ===
| | | | | Pro League | | | | | Hazfi Cup | | | | | Total | | | | |
| No | P | N | Name | S | P | M | | A | S | P | M | | A | S | P | M | | A |
|---|---|---|---|---|---|---|---|---|---|---|---|---|---|---|---|---|---|---|
| 1 | GK | (Iran) | Sosha Makani | 12 | 12 | 1143 | | | 2 | 2 | 225 | 0 | | 14 | 14 | 1368 | | |
| 2 | LM | (Iran) | Omid Alishah | 14 | 6 | 1199 | 3 | 1 | 2 | 2 | 214 | | | 16 | 16 | 1405 | 3 | 1 |
| 3 | LB | (Iran) | Vahid Heydarieh | 1 | 1 | 63 | | | 1 | 1 | 125 | | | 2 | 2 | 188 | | |
| 4 | CB | (Costa Rica) | Michael Umaña | 4 | 6 | 393 | | | 1 | 1 | 96 | | | 5 | 7 | 489 | | |
| 6 | CB | (Iran) | Mohsen Bengar | 14 | 14 | 1339 | | 1 | 3 | 3 | 350 | | | 17 | 17 | 1689 | | |
| 8 | DM | (Iran) | Ahmad Nourollahi | 14 | 14 | 1256 | | 1 | 3 | 3 | 350 | | | 17 | 17 | 1606 | | |
| 9 | CF | (Iran) | Mehdi Taremi | 14 | 14 | 1276 | 11 | | 2 | 2 | 190 | 2 | | 16 | 16 | 1523 | 13 | |
| 10 | RW | (Iran) | Farshad Ahmadzadeh | 15 | 15 | 1276 | 1 | 2 | 2 | 2 | 168 | | | 17 | 17 | 1444 | 1 | 2 |
| 11 | CM | (Iran) | Kamal Kamyabinia | 16 | 16 | 1527 | | | 3 | 3 | 350 | | | 19 | 19 | 1877 | | |
| 12 | GK | (Iran) | Morteza Ghadimipour | | | | | | | 1 | 99 | | | | | | | |
| 14 | CF | (Honduras) | Jerry Bengtson | 3 | 11 | 417 | 4 | | 2 | 2 | 190 | | | 5 | 13 | 607 | 4 | |
| 15 | LB | (Iran) | Mohammad Ansari | 11 | 13 | 1097 | | | 1 | 2 | 234 | | | 12 | 15 | 1331 | | |
| 16 | SS | (Iran) | Reza Khaleghifar | 4 | 8 | 361 | | | | | | | | 4 | 8 | 361 | | |
| 17 | RW | (Iran) | Ali Fatemi | | | | | | | | | | | | | | | |
| 18 | DM | (Iran) | Mehrdad Kafshgari | 2 | 4 | 211 | | | | 1 | 7 | | | 2 | 5 | 218 | | |
| 19 | AM | (Iran) | Milad Kamandani | 3 | 11 | 320 | 1 | 1 | 1 | 1 | 90 | | | 4 | 12 | 410 | 1 | 1 |
| 20 | CB | (Iran) | Alireza Nourmohammadi | 9 | 9 | 826 | | | 2 | 2 | 254 | | | 11 | 11 | 1080 | | |
| 23 | CB | (Croatia) | Luka Marić | 7 | 8 | 712 | | | | 1 | 48 | | | 7 | 9 | 760 | | |
| 24 | SS | (Iran) | Hadi Norouzi | 5 | 5 | 445 | 1 | 1 | 2 | 2 | 131 | | | 7 | 7 | 564 | 1 | 1 |
| 27 | RB | (Iran) | Ramin Rezaeian | 17 | 17 | 1623 | 2 | 1 | 2 | 2 | 225 | | | 19 | 19 | 1848 | 2 | 1 |
| 29 | CM | (Iran) | Mohammad Rahmati | | | | | | | | | | | | | | | |
| 40 | RB | (Iran) | Babak Hatami | 5 | 8 | 518 | | | 2 | 2 | 116 | | | 7 | 10 | 634 | | |
| 70 | CF | (Iran) | Ali Alipour | 4 | 15 | 611 | 2 | 3 | | 3 | 124 | | 1 | 4 | 18 | 735 | 2 | 4 |
| 77 | AM | (Iran) | Mohsen Mosalman | 8 | 10 | 763 | | 2 | 1 | 3 | 120 | | | 9 | 13 | 883 | | 2 |
| 88 | GK | (Iran) | Iman Sadeghi | 5 | 6 | 489 | | | 1 | 1 | 21 | 0 | | 6 | 7 | 510 | | |
| Totals | | | | | | | 25 | 13 | | | | 2 | 1 | | | | 27 | 14 |
Last updated: 31 December 2015

=== Goalkeeping ===
| | | | League | | | Hazfi Cup | | | Total | | |
| No | N | Name | M | GA | CS | M | GA | CS | M | GA | CS |
|---|---|---|---|---|---|---|---|---|---|---|---|
| 1 | (Iran) | Sosha Makani | 18 | 15 | 8 | 2 | 0 | 2 | 20 | 15 | 10 |
| 88 | (Iran) | Iman Sadeghi | 6 | 9 | 1 | 1 | 0 | – | 7 | 9 | 1 |
| 55 | (Uzbekistan) | Alexander Lobanov | 8 | 10 | 1 | – | – | – | 8 | 10 | 1 |
| 12 | (Iran) | Morteza Ghadimipour | – | – | – | 1 | 2 | 0 | 1 | 2 | 0 |
| Total | | | 32* | 34 | 10 | 4* | 2 | 2 | 36 | 36 | 12 |

- In the second-leg match against Padideh in the league, Sosha Makani was sent off in the second half, and Iman Sadeghi came on as a substitute.
- In the second-leg match against Siah Jamegan in the league, Sosha Makani was sent off in the second half, and Alexander Lobanov came on as a substitute.
- In the match against Zob Ahan in the Hazfi Cup, Iman Sadeghi was sent off in the first half, and Morteza Ghadimipour came on as a substitute.

=== Disciplinary record ===
==== Bookings & sendings-off ====
| | | | | Pro League | | | Hazfi Cup | | | Total | | |
| No | P | N | Name | Yellow card | Double yellow card | Red card | Yellow card | Double yellow card | Red card | Yellow card | Double yellow card | Red card |
|---|---|---|---|---|---|---|---|---|---|---|---|---|
| 1 | GK | (Iran) | Sosha Makani | | | 1 | 2 | | | 2 | | 1 |
| 2 | LM | (Iran) | Omid Alishah | 5 | | | | | | 5 | | |
| 3 | LB | (Iran) | Vahid Heydarieh | | | | | | | | | |
| 4 | CB | (Costa Rica) | Michael Umaña | | | | | | | | | |
| 6 | CB | (Iran) | Mohsen Bengar | 2 | 1 | | | | | 2 | 1 | |
| 8 | DM | (Iran) | Ahmad Nourollahi | 1 | | | 1 | | | 2 | | |
| 9 | CF | (Iran) | Mehdi Taremi | 3 | | | 1 | 1 | | 4 | 1 | |
| 10 | RW | (Iran) | Farshad Ahmadzadeh | 5 | | | 1 | | | 6 | | |
| 11 | CM | (Iran) | Kamal Kamyabinia | 3 | | | | | | 3 | | |
| 12 | GK | (Iran) | Morteza Ghadimipour | | | | 1 | | | 1 | | |
| 14 | CF | (Honduras) | Jerry Bengtson | 2 | | | | | | 2 | | |
| 15 | LB | (Iran) | Mohammad Ansari | 2 | | | | | | 2 | | |
| 16 | SS | (Iran) | Reza Khaleghifar | | | | | | | | | |
| 17 | RW | (Iran) | Ali Fatemi | | | | | | | | | |
| 18 | DM | (Iran) | Mehrdad Kafshgari | 1 | | | | | | 1 | | |
| 19 | AM | (Iran) | Milad Kamandani | 1 | | | | | | 1 | | |
| 20 | CB | (Iran) | Alireza Nourmohammadi | 1 | | 1 | | | | 1 | | 1 |
| 23 | CB | (Croatia) | Luka Marić | | | | | | | | | |
| 24 | SS | (Iran) | Hadi Norouzi | 1 | | 1 | | | | 1 | | 1 |
| 27 | RB | (Iran) | Ramin Rezaeian | 1 | | | 1 | | | 2 | | |
| 29 | CM | (Iran) | Mohammad Rahmati | | | | | | | | | |
| 40 | RB | (Iran) | Babak Hatami | 3 | | | | | | 3 | | |
| 70 | CF | (Iran) | Ali Alipour | 3 | | | 1 | | | 4 | | |
| 77 | AM | (Iran) | Mohsen Mosalman | 1 | | | 1 | | | 2 | | |
| 88 | GK | (Iran) | Iman Sadeghi | | | | | | 1 | | | 1 |
| Totals | | | | 35 | 1 | 3 | 9 | 1 | 1 | 44 | 2 | 4 |
Last updated: 31 December 2015

==== Suspensions ====
| No. | Pos | Nat | Player | No. of matches served | Reason | Competition | Date served | Opponent(s) | Ref. |
|---|---|---|---|---|---|---|---|---|---|
| 1 | GK | (Iran) | Sosha Makani | 3 | Unsporting behavior | All competitions | | | |
| 2 | LW | (Iran) | Omid Alishah | 1 | Unsporting behavior | All competitions | | | |
| 20 | CB | (Iran) | Alireza Nourmohammadi | 1 | Unsporting behavior | All competitions | | | |
Last updated: 26 May 2015

=== Captaincy ===
| No. | Pos | Nat | Name | Pro League | Hazfi Cup | Total | Notes |
|---|---|---|---|---|---|---|---|
| 24 | SS | (Iran) | Hadi Norouzi | 5 | 2 | 7 | Captain |
| 20 | DF | (Iran) | Alireza Nourmohammadi | 2 | | 2 | Vice captain |
| 6 | DF | (Iran) | Mohsen Bengar | 2 | | 2 | 3rd captain |
| 18 | MF | (Iran) | Mehrdad Kafshgari | 1 | | 1 | 4th captain |
Last updated: 26 October 2015

=== Overall statistics ===
| | Pro League | | | Hazfi Cup | | | Total | | |
| | Home | Away | Total | Home | Away | Total | Home | Away | Total |
|---|---|---|---|---|---|---|---|---|---|
| Games played | 8 | 9 | 17 | 2 | 1 | 3 | 10 | 10 | 20 |
| Games won | 4 | 4 | 8 | 2 | 0 | 2 | 6 | 4 | 10 |
| Games drawn | 2 | 3 | 5 | 0 | 0 | 0 | 2 | 3 | 5 |
| Games lost | 2 | 2 | 4 | 0 | 1 | 1 | 2 | 3 | 5 |
| Goals scored | 11 | 14 | 25 | 2 | 0 | 2 | 13 | 14 | 27 |
| Goals conceded | 7 | 11 | 18 | 0 | 2 | 2 | 7 | 13 | 20 |
| Goal difference | +4 | +3 | +7 | +2 | -2 | 0 | +6 | +1 | +7 |
| Clean sheets | 4 | 3 | 7 | 2 | 0 | 0 | 6 | 3 | 9 |
| Goal by Substitute | 1 | 1 | 2 | 0 | 0 | 0 | 1 | 1 | 2 |
| Biggest Win | 2–0 (Malavan & Esteghlal Kh.) | 2–0 (Foolad & Rah Ahan) | 2–0 (4times) | 1–0 (Paykan & Malavan) | – | 1–0 (Paykan & Malavan) | 2–0 (Malavan & Esteghlal Kh.) | 2–0 (Foolad & Rah Ahan) | 2–0 (4times) |
| Biggest Loss | 2–1 (Zob Ahan & Saipa) | 4–2 (Sepahan) | 4–2 (Sepahan) | – | 2–0 (Zob Ahan) | 2–0 (Zob Ahan) | 2–1 (Zob Ahan & Saipa) | 4–2 (Sepahan) | 4–2 (Sepahan) |
| Players used | 21 | 22 | 22 | 18 | 14 | 22 | 21 | 23 | 23 |
| Average Goals for per game | 1.38 | 1.56 | 1.47 | 1 | 0 | 0.67 | 1.3 | 1.40 | 1.35 |
| Average Goals against per game | 0.88 | 1.22 | 1.06 | 0 | 2 | 0.67 | 0.70 | 1.30 | 1 |
| Winning Rate | 50% | 44.44% | 47.06% | 100% | 0 | 66.67% | 60% | 40% | 50% |
| Most appearances | Kamal Kamyabinia; Ramin Rezaeian (9) | Mehdi Taremi; Ramin Rezaeian (8) | Ramin Rezaeian (17) | 10 players (2) | 14 players (1) | 5 players (3) | Kamal Kamyabinia; Ramin Rezaeian (11) | 8 players (8) | Kamal Kamyabinia; Ramin Rezaeian (19) |
| Most minutes played | Ramin Rezaeian (852') | Ramin Rezaeian (771') | Ramin Rezaeian (1623') | 5 players (225') | 7 players (125') | 3 players (350') | Kamal Kamyabinia (1041') | Ramin Rezaeian (819') | Kamal Kamyabinia (1717') |
| Top scorer | Mehdi Taremi (6) | Mehdi Taremi (5) | Mehdi Taremi (11) | Mehdi Taremi (2) | – | Mehdi Taremi (2) | Mehdi Taremi (8) | Mehdi Taremi (5) | Mehdi Taremi (13) |
| Top assister | Ali Alipour; Mohsen Mosalman (2) | Ali Alipour (1) | Ali Alipour (3) | Ali Alipour (1) | – | Ali Alipour (1) | Ali Alipour (3) | Ali Alipour (1) | Ali Alipour (4) |
Last updated: 31 December 2015

== Club ==
=== Kit ===
Supplier: (Germany) Uhlsport

| Home Kit | Away Kit | Third Kit |

Source: "Persepolis F.C.' current kit". Archived from the original on 29 January 2010.

=== Sponsorship ===
- Main sponsor: Hamrah-e Avval
- Official sponsor: Kosar Credit Cooperative
- Official shirt manufacturer:Uhlsport
- Official water: Damavand Mineral Water Co.

== See also ==
- 2015–16 Iran Pro League
- 2015–16 Hazfi Cup
