= Emam Reza Stadium (Tehran) =

Football stadium in Tehran, Iran

Coordinates: 35.6344°N 51.3274°E

Imam Reza Stadium
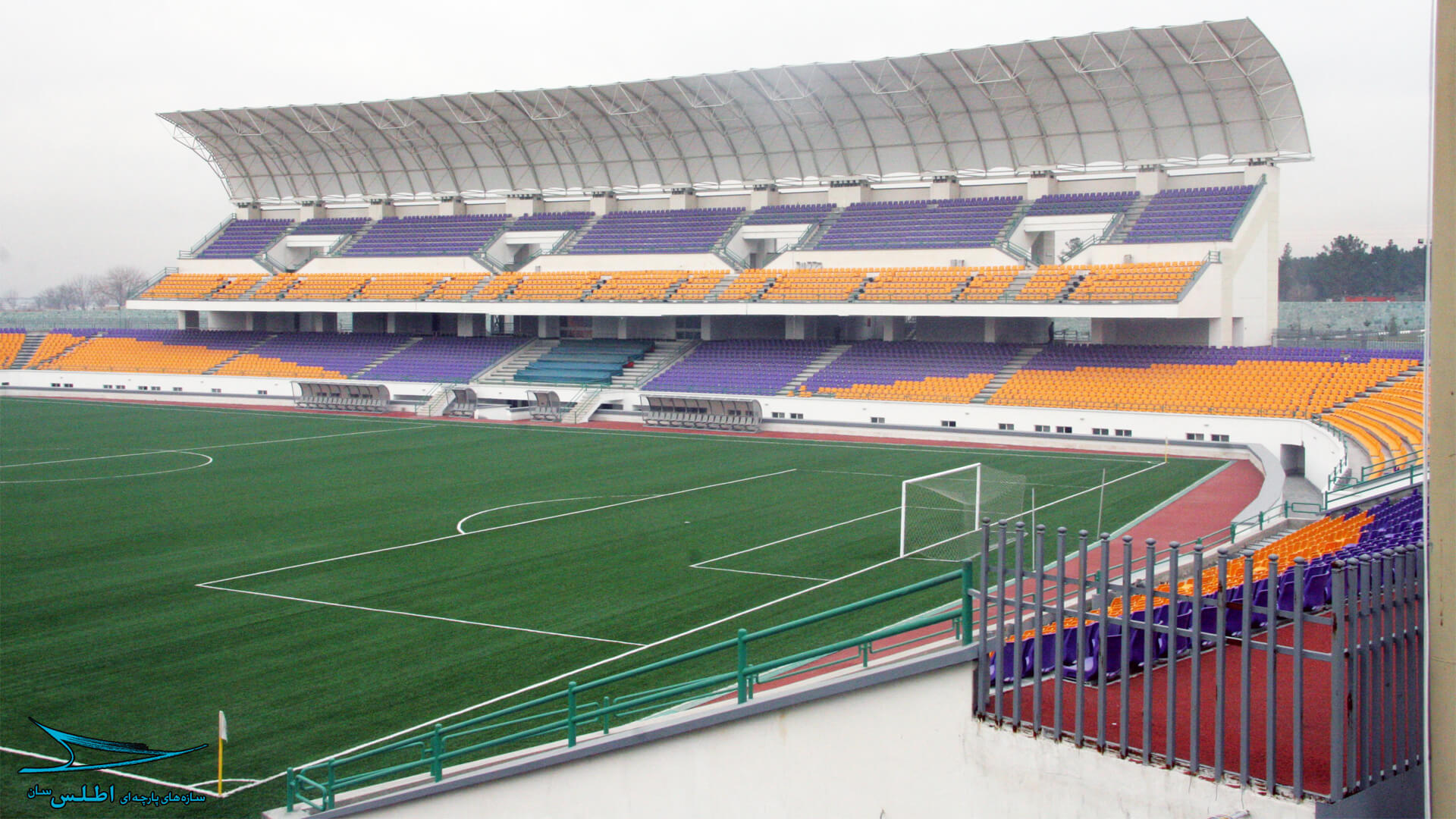
- Interactive map of Imam Reza Stadium
- Full name: Imam Reza Stadium (official name)
- Location: Tehran; Iran
- Owner: Tehran Municipality
- Operator: Esteghlal
- Capacity: 12,000
- Surface: Artificial grass

Construction
- Opened: 1 May 2010

Tenants
- Persepolis Reserves 2010-16; Esteghlal 2016-

The Imam Reza Stadium is a football stadium in Tehran, Iran. It is the training ground of Esteghlal. The stadium, which has a capacity of 12,000 people, opened in 2010.

== See also ==
- Esteghlal
