= Ali Fatemi =

Iranian footballer

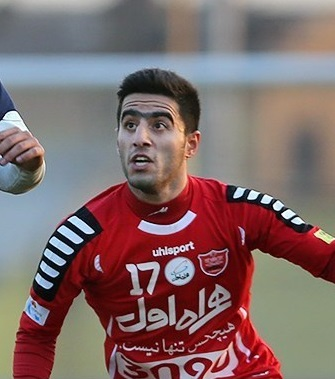

Personal information
- Full name: Seyed Ali Fatemi
- Date of birth: 2 November 1993 (age 32)
- Place of birth: Amol, Iran
- Height: 1.82 m (5 ft 11 1/2 in)
- Positions: Winger; striker

Youth career
- 2008–2012: Naft Mahmoudabad
- 2012–2015: Persepolis

Senior career*
| Years | Team | Apps | (Gls) |
| 2013–2016 | Persepolis B | 20 | (8) |
| 2014–2016 | Persepolis | 2 | (0) |
| 2015–2016 | → Rah Ahan (loan) | 13 | (0) |
| 2016–2017 | Saba Qom | 9 | (0) |
| 2017–2020 | Malavan | 1 | (0) |

International career
| 2014 | Iran (students) | 10 | (3) |
- * Club domestic league appearances and goals

Seyed Ali Fatemi (Persian: علی فاطمی; born 2 November 1993) is an Iranian former footballer who played as a striker and winger.

== Career ==
=== Youth teams ===
Fatemi was a member of the Persepolis, Naft Mahmoudabad and Rah Ahan Youth Academy. He played for Rah Ahan U21 in AFC Vision Asia U-21 Tehran Premier League.

=== Persepolis ===
After graduating from Rah Ahan Academy he had training with Persepolis. He played in few friendlies and scored against Padideh. He passed technical test alongside three other players and signed a three-years contract with Persepolis on 9 July 2014. He made his debut for Persepolis in 2–0 win against Saba Qom as a substitute for Omid Alishah on 30 August 2014.

== Club career statistics ==
As of 18 September 2014.

| Club | Division | Season | League | | Hazfi Cup | | Asia | | Total | |
| Club | Division | Season | Apps | Goals | Apps | Goals | Apps | Goals | Apps | Goals |
|---|---|---|---|---|---|---|---|---|---|---|
| Persepolis | Pro League | 2014–15 | 2 | 0 | 0 | 0 | 0 | 0 | 2 | 0 |
| Persepolis | Pro League | 2015–16 | 0 | 0 | 0 | 0 | – | – | 0 | 0 |
| Career totals | | | 2 | 0 | 0 | 0 | 0 | 0 | 2 | 0 |

- Assist Goals

| Season | Team | Assists |
|---|---|---|
| 14–15 | Persepolis | 0 |
