= Ali Mohsenzadeh =

Iranian footballer

Personal information
- Date of birth: 13 February 1993 (age 33)
- Place of birth: Tehran, Iran
- Height: 1.87 m (6 ft 1 1/2 in)
- Position: Goalkeeper

Team information
- Current team: Be'sat Kermanshah
- Number: 1

Youth career
- Bahar
- –2012: Moghavemat Tehran
- 2012: Naft Tehran

Senior career*
| Years | Team | Apps | (Gls) |
| 2013 | Zob Ahan | 1 | (0) |
| 2013–2016 | Naft Tehran | 0 | (0) |
| 2015 | → Khoneh Be Khoneh (loan) | 0 | (0) |
| 2016 | Persepolis | 0 | (0) |
| 2016 | Shahrdari Arak | | |
| 2016–2017 | Moghavemat Sari | | |
| 2017–2018 | Nassaji | 0 | (0) |
| 2018 | Shahrdari Tabriz | 12 | (0) |
| 2018–2021 | Havadar | 55 | (0) |
| 2021–2023 | Naft M.I.S | 33 | (0) |
| 2023–2024 | Darya Caspian | 17 | (0) |
| 2024 | Shahin Bandar Ameri | 13 | (0) |
| 2024– | Be'sat Kermanshah | 14 | (0) |

International career^{‡}
| 2008–2010 | Iran U17 | | |
| 2011–2012 | Iran U20 | 8 | (0) |
- * Club domestic league appearances and goals as of 22 April 2025 ‡ National team caps and goals as of 8 November 2011

Ali Mohsenzadeh (Persian: علی محسن زاده; born 13 February 1993) is an Iranian football goalkeeper who plays for Be'sat Kermanshah in Azadegan League.

== Club career ==
=== Zob Ahan ===
He joined Zob Ahan in January 2013. He made his debut as a starter against Gahar.

=== Naft Tehran ===
In the summer of 2013, he signed with Naft Tehran until 2017. He was the 3rd choice in the first team after Alireza Beiranvand and Sosha Makani during first mid-season. He also played with U21s in the 2013–14 season. After Sosha Makani's departure in the winter of 2014 and the joining of Vahid Sheikhveisi nothing changed for him and he continued as 3rd Keeper with Naft Tehran. When he was under contract with Naft Tehran, he failed to make any official appearances.

=== Khouneh Be Khouneh ===
In the summer of 2015, he joined Khouneh Be Khouneh for the season on loan from Naft Tehran. Like in Naft Tehran, he failed to make an official appearance. He was the 3rd choice after Mohammad Hossein Naeiji and Sirous Sangchouli. In the winter of 2016, Khouneh Be Khouneh canceled his loan contract and he returned to Naft Tehran.

=== Persepolis ===
After his return from Khouneh Be Khouneh, he was released from Naft Tehran with a mutual agreement on 18 January 2016. On 19 January 2016, he joined Persepolis with a contract until 2018. Mohsenzadeh was released from Persepolis at the end of the 2015–16 season after not appearing in any games.

=== Club career statistics ===
As of 18 January 2013

| Club | Division | Season | League | | Hazfi Cup | | Asia | | Total | |
| Club | Division | Season | Apps | Goals | Apps | Goals | Apps | Goals | Apps | Goals |
|---|---|---|---|---|---|---|---|---|---|---|
| Zob Ahan | Pro League | 2012–13 | 1 | 0 | 0 | 0 | – | – | 1 | 0 |
| Naft Tehran | Pro League | 2013–14 | 0 | 0 | 0 | 0 | – | – | 0 | 0 |
| Naft Tehran | Pro League | 2014–15 | 0 | 0 | 0 | 0 | 0 | 0 | 0 | 0 |
| Khouneh Be Khouneh | Division 1 | 2015–16 | 0 | 0 | 0 | 0 | – | – | 0 | 0 |
| Persepolis | Pro League | 2015–16 | 0 | 0 | 0 | 0 | – | – | 0 | 0 |
| Career Total | | | 1 | 0 | 0 | 0 | 0 | 0 | 1 | 0 |

== International career ==
=== U20 ===
He was part of Iran U–20 participating in 2012 AFC U-19 Championship. He was the first choice of Akbar Mohammadi in qualifiers, but benched during the championship.

=== U23 ===
He invited to Iran U-23 training camp by Nelo Vingada to preparation for Incheon 2014 and 2016 AFC U-22 Championship (Summer Olympic qualification).
