= Milad Kamandani =

Iranian football player (born 1994)

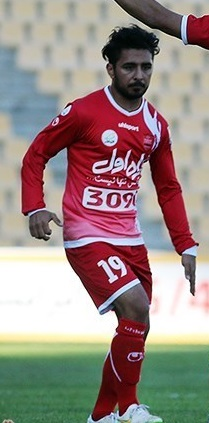

Personal information
- Date of birth: 7 July 1994 (age 32)
- Place of birth: Karaj, Iran
- Height: 1.71 m (5 ft 7 1/2 in)
- Position: Attacking midfielder

Team information
- Current team: Sanat Naft
- Number: 21

Youth career
- 2005–2007: Payam Azadi-e Karaj
- 2007–2012: Rah Ahan
- 2012–2013: Moghavemat Tehran
- 2013–2015: Persepolis

Senior career*
Years	Team	Apps	(Gls)
2013–2016	Persepolis	19	(1)
2016–2018	Padideh	45	(2)
2018–2020	Malavan	40	(3)
2020	Gol Gohar Sirjan	11	(2)
2020–2021	Nassaji Mazandaran	15	(2)
2021–2022	Shahr Khodro	13	(2)
2022	Fajr Sepasi	11	(1)
2022–2023	Kheybar	22	(0)
2023–2024	Saipa	15	(0)
2024–	Sanat Naft	14	(0)

International career^{‡}
2013–2014	Iran U20	1	(0)
2014–2016	Iran U23	13	(1)
- * Club domestic league appearances and goals as of 16 April 2025 ‡ National team caps and goals as of 22 January 2016

Milad Kamandani (Persian: ميلاد کمندانی; born 7 July 1994) is an Iranian football player who plays for Sanat Naft in the Azadegan League as an attacking midfielder.

== Club career ==
=== Persepolis ===
He joined Rah Ahan training camp after 2012–13 Tehran U-19 Pro League finishing with Moghavemat Tehran U21. He passed technical test and chosen by the head coach Ali Daei to be part of team's first team during 2013–14 Iran Pro League, but he not signed with Rah Ahan and joined Persepolis training camp after Ali Daei becomes Persepolis' head coach. He trained with Persepolis for three days and participated in training match against Tractor Sazi. He promoted to the first team on 11 July 2013 with signing a five-year contract. He played for Persepolis U21 in AFC Vision Asia U-21 Tehran Premier League. He made his debut for Persepolis against Sepahan in week 25 of 2013–14 Iran Pro League.

=== Club career statistics ===
As of 31 December 2015

Club	Division	Season	League		Hazfi Cup		Asia		Total	
Club	Division	Season	Apps	Goals	Apps	Goals	Apps	Goals	Apps	Goals
Persepolis	Pro League	2013–14	4	0	0	0	–	–	2	0
Persepolis	Pro League	2014–15	5	0	0	0	1	0	4	0
Persepolis	Pro League	2015–16	21	1	1	0	–	–	12	1
Career Total			30	1	1	0	1	0	18	1

== International career ==
=== Iran U–20 ===
He was called up to the Iran U–20 team by Ali Doustimehr in November 2013.

=== Iran U–23 ===
He was called up to the Iran U–23 team by Nelo Vingada in June 2014.

== Honours ==
=== Club ===
Persepolis

- Iran Pro League runner-up: 2013–14, 2015–16
- Shahre khodro fc
- Iran Pro League: 2015–2016, 2017
- Malavan club
- Azadegan league : 2017, 2018

=== International ===
Iran Olympic

- WAFF U-23 Championship: 2015
