= Iman Sadeghi =

Iranian footballer

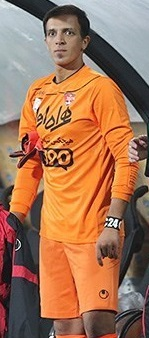

Personal information
- Full name: Iman Sadeghi Hastejeh
- Date of birth: 9 January 1992 (age 34)
- Place of birth: Tehran, Iran
- Height: 1.81 m (5 ft 11 1/2 in)
- Position: Goalkeeper

Team information
- Current team: Mes Kerman
- Number: 1

Youth career
- 2007–2008: PAS Tehran
- 2008–2010: Esteghlal
- 2010–2011: Steel Azin
- 2011–2013: Malavan

Senior career*
Years	Team	Apps	(Gls)
2009–2010	Esteghlal	0	(0)
2010–2011	Steel Azin	2	(0)
2011–2015	Malavan	30	(0)
2015–2016	Persepolis	6	(0)
2016	Khoneh Be Khoneh	17	(0)
2016–2017	Malavan	26	(0)
2017–2019	Sepidrood	23	(0)
2019–2020	Damash Gilan	22	(0)
2020–2021	Shahin Bushehr	26	(0)
2021–2022	Fajr Sepasi	30	(0)
2022–2023	Malavan	23	(0)
2023–2024	Paykan	8	(0)
2024–	Mes Kerman	28	(0)

International career^{‡}
2007–2009	Iran U17	9	(0)
2010–2011	Iran U20	2	(0)
2012–2015	Iran U22	23	(0)
- * Club domestic league appearances and goals as of 29 April 2025 ‡ National team caps and goals as of 1 July 2015

Iman Sadeghi Hastejeh (Persian: ایمان صادقی; born 9 January 1992) is an Iranian professional football goalkeeper who plays for Mes Kerman in the Azadegan League.

== Career ==
=== Steel Azin ===
Sadeghi played for Esteghlal before moving to Steel Azin in the summer of 2010.

=== Persepolis ===
On 26 July 2015 Sadeghi joined Persian Gulf Pro League club Persepolis on a three-year contract.

=== Khooneh be Khooneh ===
On 19 January 2016, Khooneh be Khooneh signed Sadeghi with a fee of 59,000 euros.

=== Club career statistics ===
As of 6 November 2015

Club	Division	Season	League		Hazfi Cup		Asia		Total	
Club	Division	Season	Apps	Goals	Apps	Goals	Apps	Goals	Apps	Goals
Esteghlal	Pro League	2009–10	0	0	0	0	0	0	0	0
Steel Azin	Pro League	2010–11	2	0	1	0	-	-	3	0
Malavan	Pro League	2011–12	0	0	0	0	-	-	0	0
Malavan	Pro League	2012–13	0	0	0	0	-	-	0	0
Malavan	Pro League	2013–14	11	0	1	0	-	-	12	0
Malavan	Pro League	2014–15	17	0	1	0	-	-	18	0
Persepolis	Pro League	2015–16	6	0	1	0	–	–	7	0
Career total			36	0	4	0	0	0	40	0

== International ==
Sadeghi Represented Iran at the 2009 FIFA U-17 World Cup in Nigeria.

== External sources ==
- Profile at Persianleague
