= Ahmad Ahi =

Iranian footballer

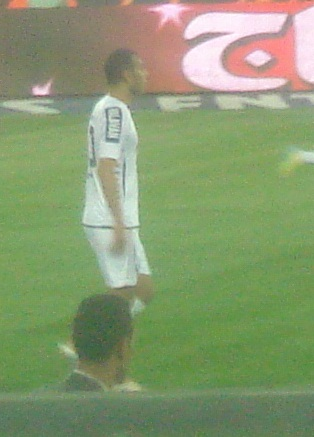

Personal information
- Full name: Seyyed Ahmad Seyyed Saleh Ahi
- Date of birth: 8 April 1985 (age 41)
- Place of birth: Tehran, Iran
- Height: 1.86 m (6 ft 1 in)
- Position: Centre back

Youth career
- 2004–2006: Persepolis

Senior career*
Years	Team	Apps	(Gls)
2007–2011	Nirou Moharekeh		
2011–2017	Malavan	129	(6)
2017	Sepidrood	11	(0)
2018	Mes Kerman	12	(0)
2019–2020	Bandar Astara		

International career
2012	Iran	1	(0)
- * Club domestic league appearances and goals

Ahmad Ahi (Persian: احمد آهی; born 8 April 1985) is an Iranian former footballer.

== Club career ==
Ahi started his career with Persepolis Academy. In 2006, he was promoted to the first team but never played a game. In summer 2011 he joined Malavan and was given the #26 jersey. After Alireza Jarahkar was injured, he was used as a regular player, and the club extended his contract for another two years in summer 2012.

=== Statistics ===
As of 31 August 2018.

Club	Division	Season	League		Hazfi Cup		Asia		Total	
Club	Division	Season	Apps	Goals	Apps	Goals	Apps	Goals	Apps	Goals
Malavan	Pro League	2011–12	23	1	0	0	–	–	23	1
Malavan	Pro League	2012–13	27	1	1	0	–	–	28	1
Malavan	Pro League	2013–14	28	2	2	0	–	–	30	2
Malavan	Pro League	2014–15	18	0	1	0	–	–	19	0
Sepidrood	Pro League	2018–19	11	0	1	0	–	–	12	0
Career total			107	4	5	0	0	0	112	4

== International ==
He invited Team Melli in April 2012 by Carlos Queiroz after injury of Siamak Kouroshi, former Naft Tehran F.C. defender. He made his debut for national team in 3–0 victory against Mozambique while he used as a substitute.
