= Omid Alishah =

Iranian footballer (born 1992)

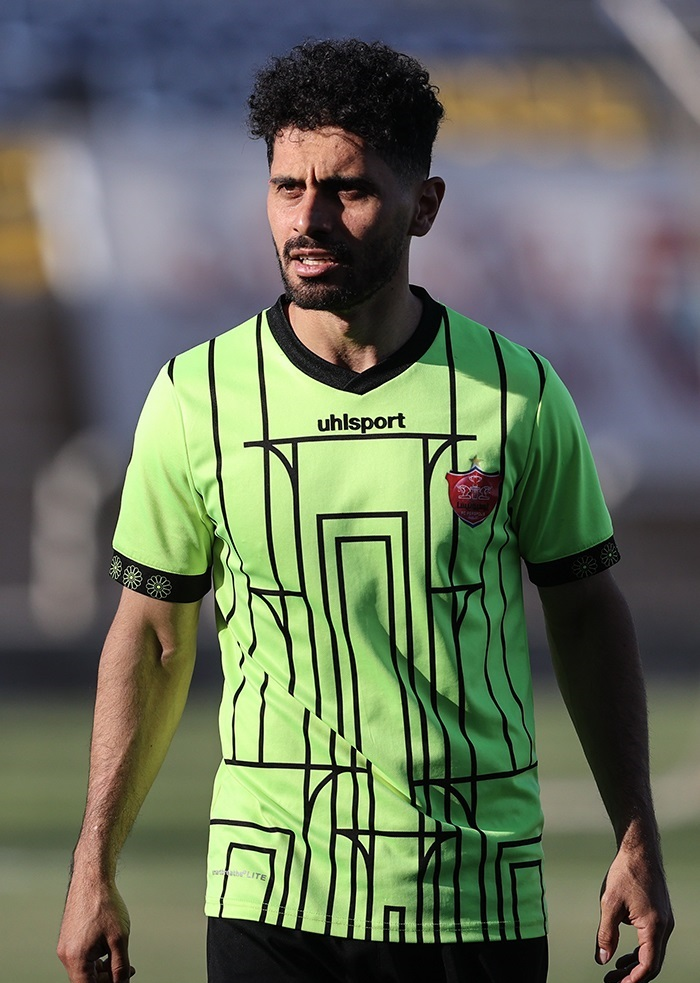
- Alishah in training with Persepolis in 2021

Personal information
- Date of birth: 10 January 1992 (age 34)
- Place of birth: Sari, Iran
- Height: 1.72 m (5 ft 8 in)
- Positions: Winger; attacking midfielder

Team information
- Current team: Gol Gohar
- Number: 9

Youth career
- 2004–2005: Padideh Sari
- 2005–2007: Moghavemat Sari
- 2007–2009: Sanaye Talaei Semnan

Senior career*
Years	Team	Apps	(Gls)
2009–2010	Nassaji	16	(3)
2010–2011	Naft Tehran	9	(1)
2011–2013	Rah Ahan	39	(9)
2013–2026	Persepolis	228	(20)
2017–2018	→ Tractor (loan)	7	(2)
2026–	Gol Gohar	4	(0)

International career
2009	Iran U17	4	(0)
2009–2010	Iran U20	5	(1)
2013	Iran U23	3	(1)
2015–2016	Iran	2	(0)
- * Club domestic league appearances and goals as of 20 February 2026

Omid Alishah (Persian: امید عالیشاه; born 10 January 1992) is an Iranian professional footballer who plays as a winger for Persian Gulf Pro League club Gol Gohar. He is one of the most successful player in Persepolis's history, having won five league titles, two Hazfi Cups, and three Super Cups with the team.

He signed a two-year contract with Persepolis on 11 June 2013 and debuted on 16 August 2013. On 23 November 2014, Alishah scored the winning goal in the Tehran derby against rival Esteghlal in the 78th minute. has also played for Nassaji Mazandaran, Naft Tehran, Rah Ahan and Tractor. Also, He was the 2015–16 PGL Top Goal Assistant.

== Club career ==
=== Nassaji ===
Alishah started his career at Nassaji when he was 17. He debuted for the club on January 7, 2010, against Shirin Faraz when he was chosen as a starter by the coach Nader Dastneshan.

=== Naft Tehran ===
In the 2010–11 season, Alishah joined the newly promoted IPL team Naft Tehran. During his time at Naft, he failed to make any appearances for the first team. He was also a part of Naft Tehran U-21 and won the 2010–11 Tehran U–21 League.

=== Rah Ahan ===
After a season at Naft, Alishah was signed up by Ali Daei for Rah Ahan. Ali Daei moved him up the field and into a more attacking position using Alishah as a right winger/second striker instead of right back where he had been used by his previous managers. Alishah, with his blistering pace, quickly managed to find his way into the starting line-up scoring five goals in his first nine games. He had a less successful second half of the season mainly due to a Cruciate ligament injury in a match against Damash Gilan in March 2012. He had been far from the team till December 2012.

=== Persepolis ===
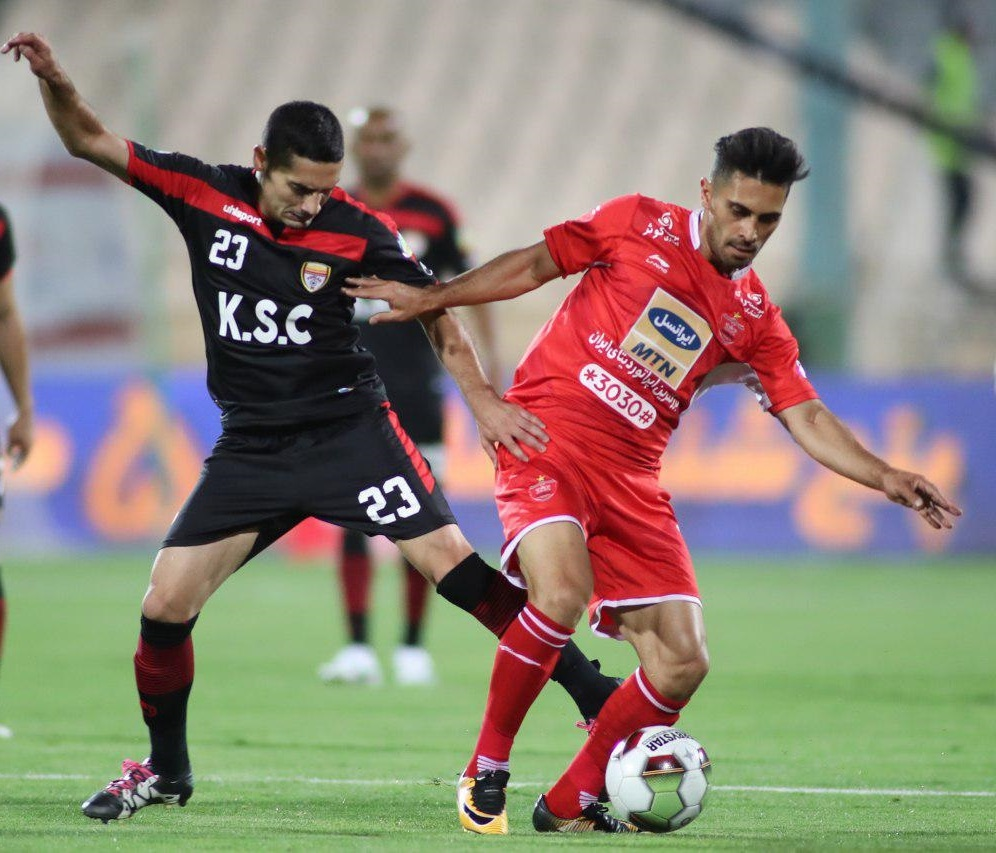
Alishah (in red) playing for Persepolis against Foolad in 2018

He signed a two-year contract with Persepolis on 11 June 2013. He made his debut on 16 August 2013 in a match against Malavan, in which he scored the winning goal. He scored his second goal on 6 April 2014 in a 2–2 draw against his former team, Rah Ahan. On 23 November 2014, Alishah scored the winning goal in the Tehran derby against rival Esteghlal in the 78th minute. He was sent off after receiving his second yellow card seconds after his goal.

In 2015, before the 2015–16 season, Alishah was designated as Persepolis' third captain. Also, he was the 2015–16 PGL Top Goal Assistant.

From the 2022 season, he became the team's first captain.

In 2025, Alishah became Persepolis's all-time record appearance. He surpassed Ali Parvin's record by playing his 280th match for the team.

=== Tractor ===
In the winter of 2017, Alishah signed a two–year contract with Tractor to spend his conscription period at the club. Alishah returned to Persepolis before 2018-19 league.

=== Gol Gohar ===
In the summer of 2026, he joined Gol Gohar Sirjan from Persepolis on a permanent transfer.

== International career ==
=== U–17 ===
Alishah represented Iran U-17 in the 3 of the four games the team played at the 2009 FIFA U-17 World Cup.

=== U–20 ===
He also made the squad for the unsuccessful 2010 AFC U-19 Championship. Surprisingly, his involvement was highly limited under the guidance of his former U17 manager, Ali Doustimehr.

=== U-22 ===
He was invited to Iran U-22 by the coach Alireza Mansourian. He made his debut against Qatar U-22 and scored his first goal at the match.

=== Senior ===
He made his debut against Guam on 3 September 2015 in the 2018 FIFA World Cup qualifying.

== Style of play ==
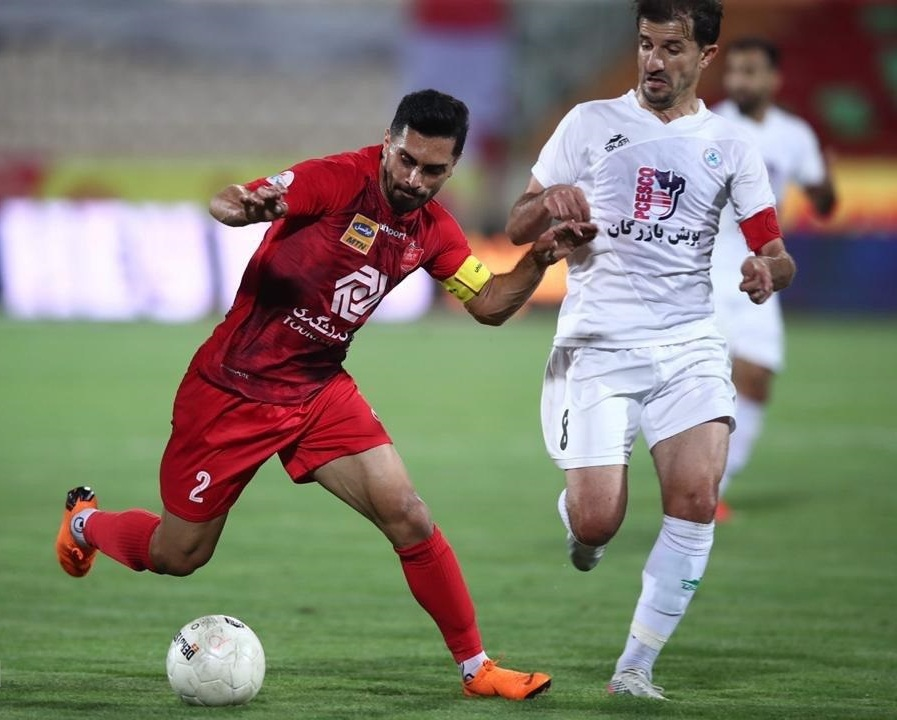
Alishah (in red) playing for Persepolis against Zob Ahan in 2020

Alishah has been a goal maker for the team with his high speed and scoring power. He has been considered to be highly capable in all attacking positions.

== Personal life ==
As a child, he experienced athletics, handball, futsal, and football. His first professional football experience was related to Iran's under-11 national football team.

On 30 January 2026, Alishah responded to the high casualty rate of the 2025–2026 Iranian protests on his Instagram, saying: "Our every fiber of our being was filled with pain, wounds, and sadness. Wounds for the truths that we do not have the light of, and sadness for the loss of our beautiful youth. Condolences to the homeland, condolences to us." On 9 February 2026, he publicly objected to being included on a list of supporters of the 1979 Islamic Revolution by the Ministry of Sport and Youth, ahead of the Revolution's anniversary.

== Club career statistics ==
As of 26 June 2026

Club	Division	Season	League		Hazfi Cup		Asia		Other		Total	
Club	Division	Season	Apps	Goals	Apps	Goals	Apps	Goals	Apps	Goals	Apps	Goals
Nassaji	Azadegan League	2009–10	16	3	1	0	—		_		17	3
Naft Tehran	Pro League	2010–11	9	1	1	0	—		_		10	1
Rah Ahan	Pro League	2011–12	23	9	0	0	—		_		23	9
Rah Ahan	Pro League	2012–13	16	0	0	0	—		_		16	0
Rah Ahan	Total		39	9	0	0	—		_		39	9
Persepolis	Pro League	2013–14	17	2	3	1	—		_		20	3
Persepolis	Pro League	2014–15	26	4	3	1	8	0	_		37	5
Persepolis	Pro League	2015–16	26	6	2	0	—		_		28	6
Persepolis	Pro League	2016–17	10	1	1	0	0	0	_		11	1
Persepolis	Pro League	2018–19	22	1	4	0	8	0	_		34	1
Persepolis	Pro League	2019–20	15	0	1	0	8	0	_		24	0
Persepolis	Pro League	2020–21	26	2	2	2	8	0	1	0	37	4
Persepolis	Pro League	2021–22	16	1	2	0	0	0	1	0	19	1
Persepolis	Pro League	2022–23	21	1	4	1	_		_		25	2
Persepolis	Pro League	2023–24	23	1	1	0	4	1	_		28	2
Persepolis	Pro League	2024–25	11	0	2	0	5	0	1	0	19	0
Persepolis	Pro League	2025–26	15	1	0	0	_		1	0	15	1
Persepolis	Total		228	20	25	5	41	1	4	0	298	26
Tractor (loan)	Pro League	2016–17	4	1	0	0	_		_		4	1
Tractor (loan)	Pro League	2017–18	3	1	1	0	0	0	_		4	1
Tractor (loan)	Total		7	2	1	0	0	0	_		8	2
Career Total			299	35	28	5	41	1	4	0	372	41

=== International ===
As of match played 8 October 2015

Appearances and goals by national team and year
National team	Year	Apps	Goals
Iran
Iran	2015	2	0
Total		2	0

==== Under-22 ====
International U-22 goals
1	23 March 2013	Doha, Qatar	Qatar	2–1	Win	Qatar International Tournament

== Honours ==
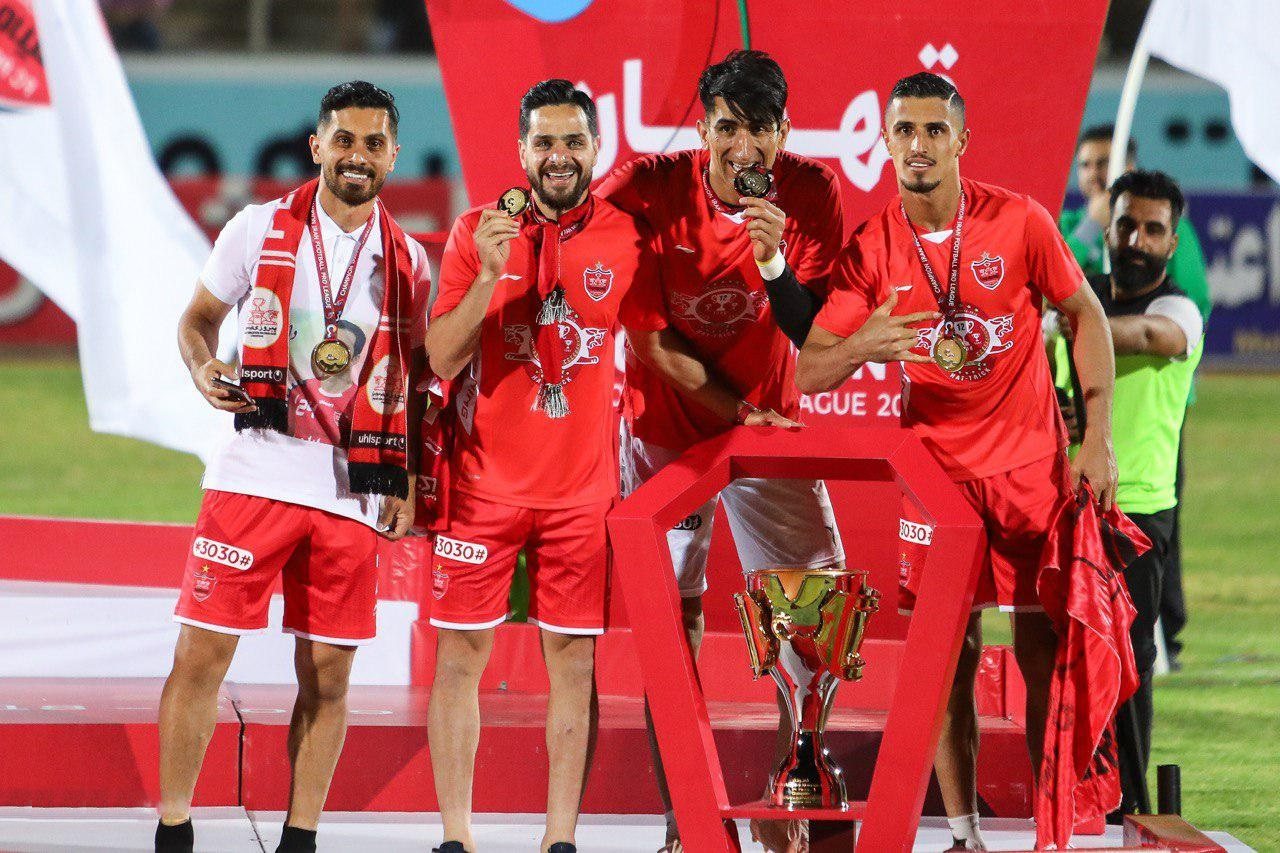
Persepolis trophy celebrations, 2018–19 Persian Gulf Pro League.

=== Club ===
Persepolis

- Persian Gulf Pro League (6): 2016–17, 2018–19, 2019–20, 2020–21, 2022–23, 2023-24
- Hazfi Cup (2): 2018–19, 2022–23
- Iranian Super Cup (5): 2017, 2018, 2019, 2020, 2023
- AFC Champions League Runner-up (2): 2018, 2020

=== Individual ===
- Persian Gulf Pro League team of the year (1): 2015–16
- Persian Gulf Pro League top assistant (1): 2015–16
