= Amir Abbas Ayenechi =

Iranian football defender

Personal information
- Full name: Amir Abbas Ayenechi
- Date of birth: 6 January 1994 (age 32)
- Place of birth: Tehran, Iran
- Height: 1.85 m (6 ft 1 in)
- Positions: Left back; left winger

Youth career
- 2011–: Persepolis

Senior career*
Years	Team	Apps	(Gls)
2011–2014	Persepolis C	47	(5)
2014–2017	Persepolis B	35	(2)
2016	Persepolis	1	(0)

International career^{‡}
2008–2010	Iran U17		
2011–2012	Iran U20		
- * Club domestic league appearances and goals as of 19 January 2016 ‡ National team caps and goals as of 19 January 2016

Amir Abbas Ayenechi (Persian: امیر عباس آینه چی, January 6, 1994 in Tehran, Iran) is an Iranian football defender, who currently plays for Persepolis in Persian Gulf Pro League.

== Club career ==
=== Youth teams ===
Ayenechi was a member of the Persepolis Youth Academy. Ayenechi Hat-trick in game opposite Esteghlal U-19 team & two assist goal.

=== Persepolis ===
He joined Persepolis in 2015-16 winter transfer with 2 1/2 years contracts.

=== Club career statistics ===
As of 19 January 2016.

Club	Division	Season	League		Hazfi Cup		Asia		Total	
Club	Division	Season	Apps	Goals	Apps	Goals	Apps	Goals	Apps	Goals
Persepolis	Pro League	2015–16	1	0	0	0	–	–	1	0
Career Total			1	0	0	0	0	0	1	0

== International career ==
Ayenechi was called up to Iran U-17 & Iran U-20 & Iran U-23's camp.

== Honours ==
=== Club ===
Persepolis

- Persian Gulf Pro League runner-up: 2015–16
