= Mohammad Rahmati =

Iranian professional football player (born 1994)

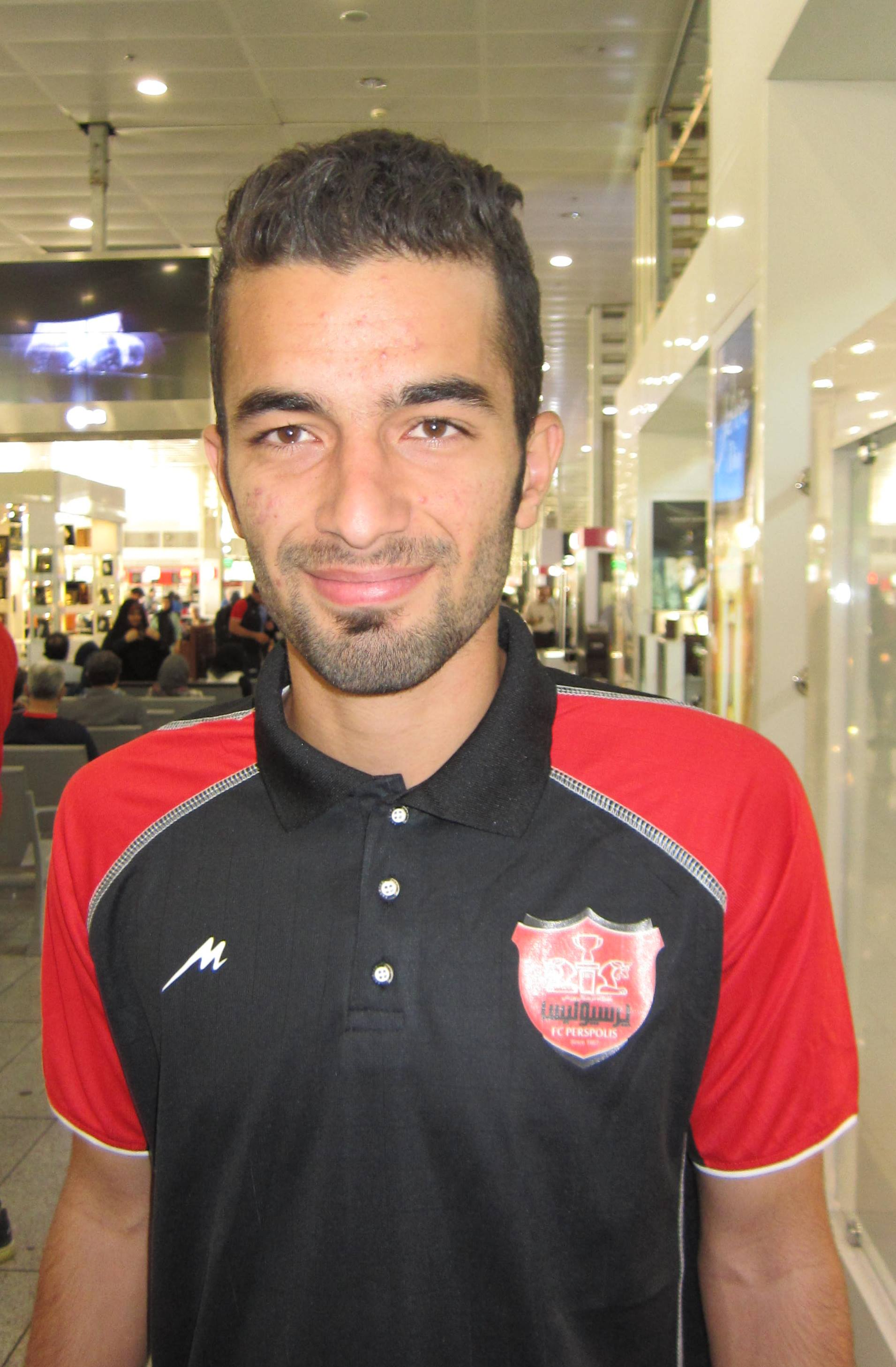

Personal information
- Full name: Mohammad Rahmati
- Date of birth: 28 December 1994 (age 31)
- Place of birth: Tonekabon, Iran
- Height: 1.70 m (5 ft 7 in)
- Position: Defensive midfielder

Team information
- Current team: Sorkhpooshan Pakdasht
- Number: 66

Youth career
- 2010–2015: Persepolis

Senior career*
Years	Team	Apps	(Gls)
2015–2017	Persepolis	1	(0)
2017	→ Machine Sazi (loan)	9	(1)
2017–2018	Saba Qom	18	(2)
2018	Nassaji Mazandaran	10	(0)
2018–	Sorkhpooshan Pakdasht	11	(1)
- * Club domestic league appearances and goals as of 30 December 2018 ‡ National team caps and goals as of 30 December 2018

Mohammad Rahmati (Persian: محمد رحمتی, born 28 December 1994) is an Iranian professional football player who currently plays for Iranian club Sorkhpooshan Pakdasht as a midfielder.

== Career ==
=== Persepolis ===
He joined Persepolis in the summer 2010 as a youth player. He played 5 seasons for Persepolis Academy. He captained Persepolis U-21 Academy team. He signed with Persepolis on 22 June 2015 with two years contracts.

=== Club Career Statistics ===
As of 30 June 2015.

Club	Division	Season	League		Hazfi Cup		Asia		Total	
Club	Division	Season	Apps	Goals	Apps	Goals	Apps	Goals	Apps	Goals
Pro League	Persepolis	2014–15	0	0	0	0	–	–	0	0
Pro League	Persepolis	2015–16	0	0	0	0	0	0	0	0
Career Total			0	0	0	0	0	0	0	0
