= Aleksandr Lobanov =

Uzbekistani footballer

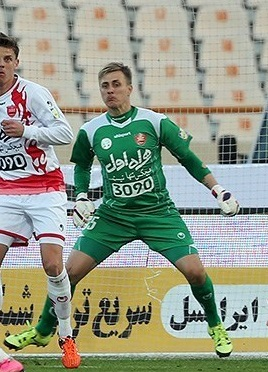

Personal information
- Date of birth: 4 January 1986 (age 40)
- Place of birth: Tashkent, Uzbekistan
- Height: 1.90 m (6 ft 3 in)
- Position: Goalkeeper

Team information
- Current team: Navbahor Namangan
- Number: 12

Senior career*
Years	Team	Apps	(Gls)
2005–2006	Sogdiana Jizzakh	25	(0)
2007	Kaisar	18	(0)
2008	Akzhayik	9	(0)
2009	FK Buxoro	4	(0)
2010	Lokomotiv BFK		
2011	Jaykhun Nukus	10	(0)
2012–2016	Pakhtakor Tashkent	100	(0)
2016	Persepolis	8	(0)
2016–2019	Pakhtakor Tashkent	43	(0)
2019–2023	Metallurg Bekabad	84	(0)
2024	Navbahor Namangan	0	(0)

International career
2015–2017	Uzbekistan	21	(0)
- * Club domestic league appearances and goals

Aleksandr Sergeyevich Lobanov (Russian: Александр Сергеевич Лобанов; born 4 January 1986) is an Uzbekistani footballer who plays as a goalkeeper for Pakhtakor Tashkent in the Uzbek League.

== Career ==
He started his playing career at Sogdiana Jizzakh in 2005. In 2007, he moved to Kazakhstani club Kaisar. Lobanov joined Pakhtakor Tashkent in 2012 and signed a 3-year contract.

=== Persepolis ===
In January 2016, Lobanov signed a six-month contract with Persian Gulf Pro League side Persepolis. He was assigned the shirt number 55. He recorded his first clean–sheet for Persepolis on 12 February 2016 in a 1–0 win over Foolad.

== International ==
A dual citizen of Uzbekistan and Kazakhstan, and with his Russian birth, he could represent for Uzbekistan, Kazakhstan and Russia. He chose the former.

Even though Lobanov has been called to Uzbekistan many times, he made his official debut for national team on 3 September 2015 in 2018 World Cup qualifying match against Yemen in the starting eleven.

== Career statistics ==
=== Club ===
As of match played 28 April 2024

Club	Season	League			Cup (Note: Includes Uzbekistan Cup and Hazfi Cup)		League Cup		Continental (Note: Includes ACL)		Other		Total	
Club	Season	Division	Apps	Goals	Apps	Goals	Apps	Goals	Apps	Goals	Apps	Goals	Apps	Goals
Kaisar	2007	Kazakhstan First Division	18	0	0	0	—		—		—		18	0
Akzhayik	2008	Kazakhstan First Division	9	0	0	0	—		—		—		9	0
FK Buxoro	2009	Uzbek League	4	0	0	0	—		—		—		4	0
Lokomotiv BFK	2010	Uzbekistan First League			1	0	—		—		—		1	0
Jaykhun Nukus	2011	Uzbekistan First League	10	0	0	0	—		—		—		10	0
Pakhtakor	2012	Uzbek League]	19	0	5	0	—		1	0	—		24	0
Pakhtakor	2013	Uzbek League]	25	0	4	0	—		5	0	—		34	0
Pakhtakor	2014	Uzbek League]	26	0	5	0	—		—		—		31	0
Pakhtakor	2015	Uzbek League]	30	0	4	0	—		6	0	1	0	41	0
Pakhtakor	Total		100	0	18	0	—		12	0	1	0	131	0
Persepolis	2015–16	Persian Gulf Pro League	8	0	0	0	—		—		—		8	0
Pakhtakor	2016	Uzbek League	14	0	—		—		—		—		14	0
Pakhtakor	2017	Uzbek League	27	0	2	0	—		—		—		29	0
Pakhtakor	2018	Uzbekistan Super League	2	0	1	0	—		1	0	—		4	0
Pakhtakor	Total		43	0	3	0	—		1	0	—		47	0
Metallurg	2019	Uzbekistan Super League	20	0	0	0	1	0	—		—		21	0
Metallurg	2020	Uzbekistan Super League	25	0	2	0	—		—		—		27	0
Metallurg	2021	Uzbekistan Super League	16	0	2	0	—		—		—		18	0
Metallurg	2022	Uzbekistan Super League	18	0	2	0	—		—		—		20	0
Metallurg	2023	Uzbekistan Super League	5	0	4	0	—		—		—		9	0
Metallurg	Total		84	0	10	0	1	0	—		—		95	0
Navbahor	2024	Uzbekistan Super League	0	0	1	0	—		0	0	—		1	0
Career Total			266	0	31	0	1	0	13	0	1	0	312	0

=== International ===
Appearances and goals by national team and year
National team	Year	Apps	Goals
Uzbekistan
Uzbekistan	2015	5	0
Uzbekistan	2016	10	0
Uzbekistan	2017	6	0
Total		21	0

== Honours ==
=== Club ===
- Uzbek League (3): 2012, 2014, 2015

Persepolis

- Persian Gulf Pro League runner-up: 2015–16
