= Vahid Heydarieh =

Iranian footballer

Personal information
- Date of birth: 3 January 1993 (age 33)
- Place of birth: Mehrshahr, Iran
- Height: 1.83 m (6 ft 0 in)
- Position: Left back

Team information
- Current team: Foolad
- Number: 50

Youth career
- 2005–2007: Nikan Mehrshahr
- 2007–2014: Paykan

Senior career*
Years	Team	Apps	(Gls)
2012–2015	Paykan	45	(2)
2015–2016	Persepolis	2	(0)
2017–2019	Malavan	64	(4)
2019–	Foolad	110	(2)

International career^{‡}
2011–2012	Iran U20	14	(4)
2014–2016	Iran U23	13	(3)
- * Club domestic league appearances and goals as of 1 May 2025 ‡ National team caps and goals as of 22 January 2016

Vahid Heydarieh (Persian: وحید حیدریه; born 1 January 1993) is an Iranian football defender who plays for Persian Gulf Pro League club Foolad.

== Club career ==
=== Paykan ===
He was part of Paykan Academy. He had been promoted to first team after poor result in 2012–13 season. He made his debut for Paykan against Tractor Sazi on 31 December 2012.

=== Persepolis ===
On 13 July 2015 Heydarieh joined Persian Gulf Pro League club Persepolis on a three-year contract. Heydarieh was injured for an extended period at the beginning of the season.

=== Club career statistics ===
As of 6 November 2015

Club	Division	Season	League		Hazfi Cup		Asia		Other		Total	
Club	Division	Season	Apps	Goals	Apps	Goals	Apps	Goals	Apps	Goals	Apps	Goals
Paykan	Pro League	2012–13	13	1	0	0	–	–	0	0	13	1
Paykan	Division 1	2013–14	17	1	1	0	–	–	0	0	18	1
Paykan	Pro League	2014–15	18	0	2	0	–	–	0	0	20	0
Paykan	Total		48	2	3	0	0	0	0	0	51	2
Persepolis	Persian Gulf Pro League	2015–16	2	0	1	0	–	–	0	0	2	0
Malavan	Azadegan League	2016-17	9	0	0	0	0	0	0	0	9	0
Malavan	Azadegan League	2017-18	31	4	2	0	0	0	0	0	33	4
Malavan	Azadegan League	2018-19	24	0	1	0	0	0	0	0	25	0
Malavan	Total		64	4	3	0	0	0	0	0	67	4
Foolad	Persian Gulf Pro League	2019-20	27	0	1	0	0	0	0	0	28	0
Foolad	Persian Gulf Pro League	2020-21	19	0	3	1	4	0	0	0	26	1
Foolad	Persian Gulf Pro League	2021-22	25	0	1	1	7	0	1	0	34	1
Foolad	Persian Gulf Pro League	2022-23	18	2	2	0	0	0	0	0	20	2
Foolad	Persian Gulf Pro League	2023-24	11	0	0	0	0	0	0	0	11	0
Foolad	Total		100	2	7	2	11	0	1	0	119	4
Career Total			214	8	14	2	11	0	1	0	240	10

== International career ==
=== U20 ===
He was part of Iran U–20 during 2012 AFC U-19 Championship qualification, 2012 CIS Cup, 2012 AFF U-19 Youth Championship and 2012 AFC U-19 Championship.

=== U23 ===
He invited to Iran U-23 training camp by Nelo Vingada to preparation for Incheon 2014 and 2016 AFC U-22 Championship (Summer Olympic qualification). He named in Iran U23 final list for Incheon 2014.

== Honours ==
Foolad

- Hazfi Cup: 2020–21
- Iranian Super Cup: 2021
