= Mohammad Ansari (footballer) =

Iranian football player (born 1991)

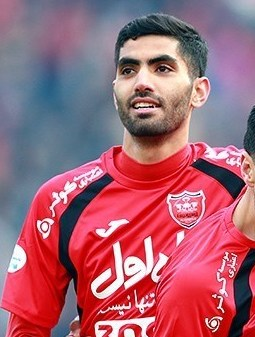
- Ansari with Persepolis in 2017

Personal information
- Full name: Mohammad Ansari
- Date of birth: September 23, 1991 (age 35)
- Place of birth: Tehran, Iran
- Height: 1.87 m (6 ft 1 1/2 in)
- Positions: Left back; centre back

Youth career
- 2009–2012: Esteghlal

Senior career*
Years	Team	Apps	(Gls)
2012–2013	Esteghlal	0	(0)
2013–2014	Fajr Sepasi	22	(1)
2014–2015	Shahrdari Tabriz	20	(0)
2015–2021	Persepolis	99	(2)
2021–2022	Mes Rafsanjan	8	(0)

International career^{‡}
2010–2012	Iran U20	8	(1)
2012–2013	Iran U23	6	(0)
2016–2018	Iran	4	(0)
- * Club domestic league appearances and goals as of 19 March 2021 ‡ National team caps and goals as of 17 March 2018

Mohammad Ansari (Persian: محمد انصاری, born September 23, 1991, in Tehran, Iran) is an Iranian football player, who currently plays for Mes Rafsanjan in Persian Gulf Pro League. Ansari had been a key player in Persepolis in the recent years and helped the Reds win back-to-back titles in Iran league.He is also known for his positions in favor of the hardliners of the Islamic Republic.

== Club career ==
=== Persepolis ===
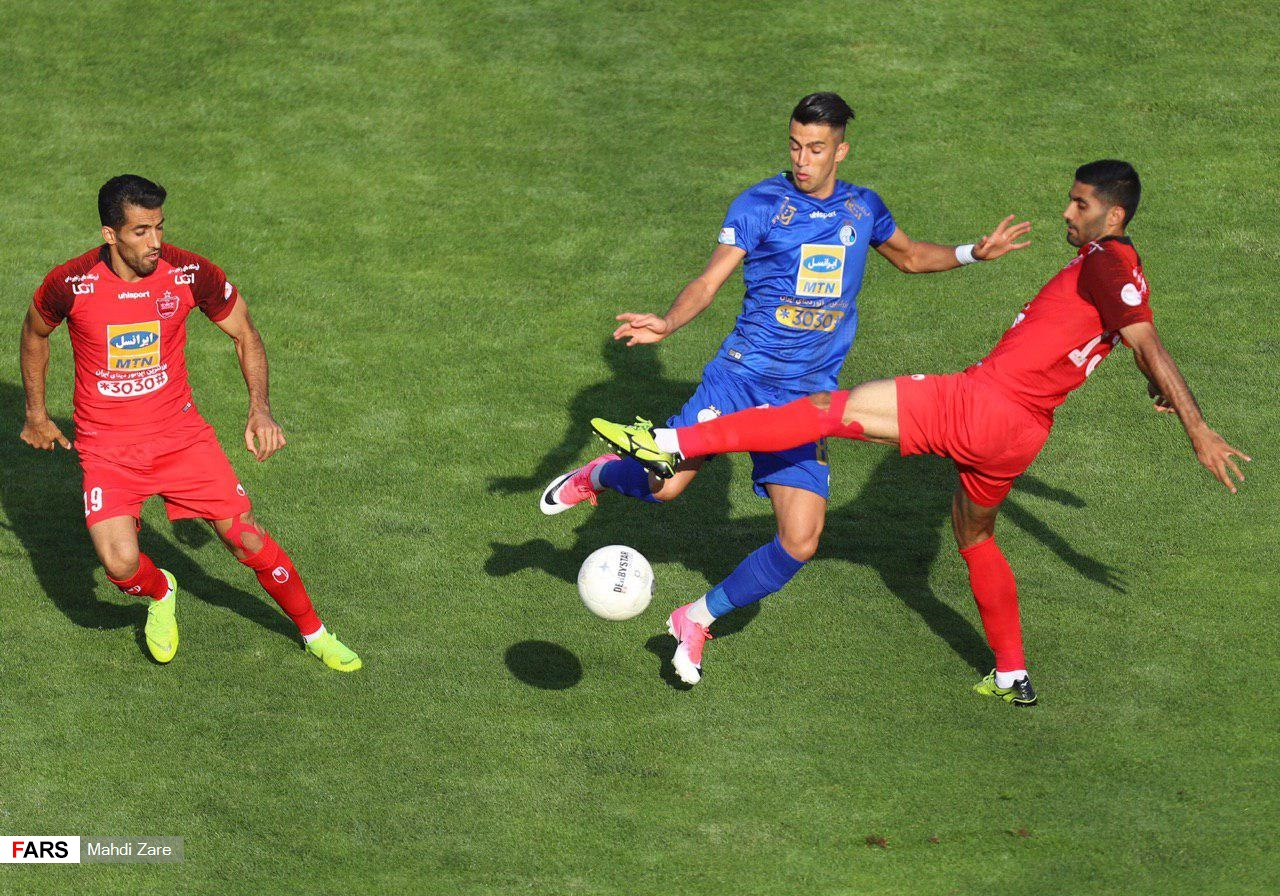
Ansari (right) with Persepolis in 2019

Ansari joined Iranian giants Persepolis from Azadegan League side Shahrdari Tabriz. Ansari quickly became a first team regular at the left back position and was one of the surprise performers of the 2015–16 season. He played an important role for Persepolis in his second season when they won the Persian Gulf Pro League in the 2016–17 which resulted in calling up to the national team.

While playing for Persepolis in AFC Champions League 2018 Final, he suffered a serious injury and ruled out of remaining games till end of the season. In season 2018-2019 Persian Gulf Pro League, he achieved championship of the league with Perspolis F.C.

=== Mes Rafsanjan ===
On 19 March 2021, Ansari signed a contract with Persian Gulf Pro League team Mes Rafsanjan.

== Club Career Statistics ==
As of 19 March 2021.

Club	Division	Season	League		Hazfi Cup		Asia		Total	
Club	Division	Season	Apps	Goals	Apps	Goals	Apps	Goals	Apps	Goals
Esteghlal	Pro League	2012–13	0	0	0	0	—		0	0
Fajr Sepasi	Pro League	2012–13	3	0	2	0	—		5	0
Fajr Sepasi	Pro League	2013–14	19	1	0	0	—		19	1
Shahrdari Tabriz	Division 1	2014–15	20	0	0	0	—		20	0
Total			42	1	2	0	—		44	1
Persepolis	Pro League	2015–16	20	1	2	0	—		22	1
Persepolis	Pro League	2016–17	28	0	1	0	6	0	35	0
Persepolis	Pro League	2017–18	26	1	2	0	12	0	40	1
Persepolis	Pro League	2018–19	7	0	1	1	5	0	13	1
Persepolis	Pro League	2019–20	17	0	3	0	1	0	21	0
Persepolis	Pro League	2020–21	1	0	1	0	0	0	2	0
Persepolis	Total		99	2	10	1	24	0	133	3
Mes Rafsanjan	Pro League	2020–21	2	0	0	0	—		2	0
Mes Rafsanjan	Total		2	0	0	0	—		2	0
Career total			143	3	12	1	24	0	179	4

- Assist Goals

Season	Team	Assists
13–14	Fajr Sepasi	1
15–16	Persepolis	1
2016–17	Persepolis	1
2017–18	Persepolis	2
2018–19	Persepolis	0
2019–20	Persepolis	0

== National football team ==
Team	Season	Apps	Goals
Iran national under-20 football team	2010–2012	8	1
Iran national under-23 football team	2012–2013	6	0
Iran national football team	2016–2018	4	0

== International career ==
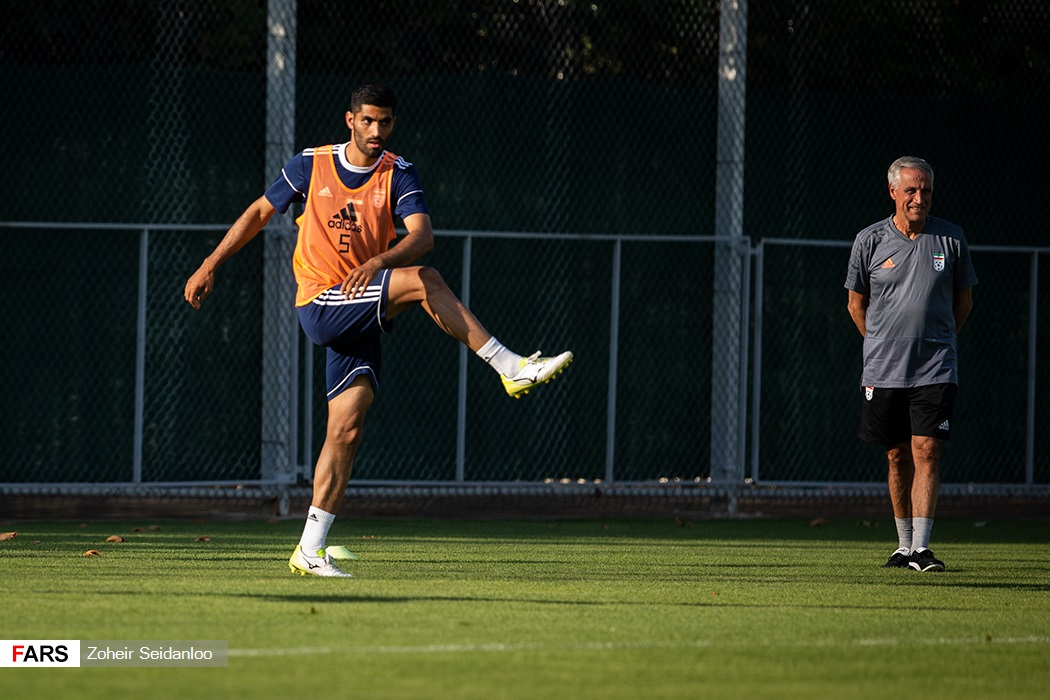
Ansari in training with Iran (2019)

Ansari was called up to the senior Iran squad by Carlos Queiroz for friendlies against Macedonia and Kyrgyzstan in June 2016. He made his debut on 10 November 2016 against Papua New Guinea in a friendly match. In 2017 Queiroz assigned him a defender position. He is scheduled to play against South Korea and Syria in the third round of the 2018 FIFA World Cup. In May 2018 he was named in Iran's preliminary squad for the 2018 World Cup in Russia. He did not make the final 23.

== Honours ==
=== Club ===
Persepolis

- Persian Gulf Pro League (4): 2016–17, 2017–18, 2018–19, 2019–20
- Hazfi Cup (1): 2018–19
- Iranian Super Cup (3): 2017, 2018, 2019
- AFC Champions League runner-up: 2018, 2020
