= Reza Khaleghifar =

Iranian footballer

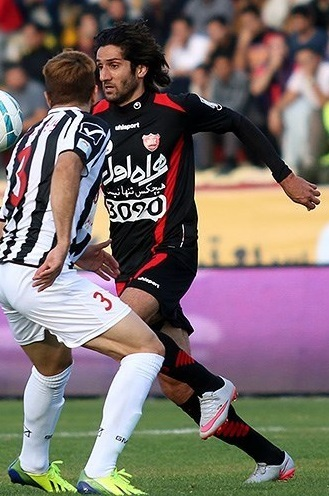

Personal information
- Date of birth: 21 September 1983 (age 43)
- Place of birth: Mati Kola, Babol, Iran
- Height: 1.78 m (5 ft 10 in)
- Position: Forward

Youth career
- 1997–2002: Matin Babol
- 2002–2004: Persepolis Babol
- 2004–2005: Saba Battery
- 2005–2006: Fajr Sepah Tehran

Senior career*
Years	Team	Apps	(Gls)
2006–2009	Fajr Sepasi	82	(12)
2009–2011	Saipa	43	(5)
2011–2013	Sanat Naft	42	(7)
2013–2014	Rah Ahan	41	(3)
2014–2016	Persepolis	18	(0)
2016–2018	Gostaresh Foulad	44	(14)
2018–2019	Machine Sazi	26	(4)
2019–2020	Pars Jonoubi	27	(1)
2020–2021	Sanat Naft	27	(4)
2021–2022	Zob Ahan	21	(1)
2022	Saipa	32	(3)

International career
2008	Iran	1	(0)

Managerial career
- 2023: Saipa (assistant)
- * Club domestic league appearances and goals

Reza Khaleghifar (Persian: رضا خالقی‌فر; born 21 September 1983) is an Iranian football coach and a former player.

== Club career statistics ==
Club performance			League		Cup		Continental		Total	
Season	Club	League	Apps	Goals	Apps	Goals	Apps	Goals	Apps	Goals
Iran			League		Hazfi Cup		Asia		Total	
2006–07	Fajr	Pro League	19	2	0	0	–		19	2
2007–08	Fajr	Pro League	32	5	2	0	–		34	5
2008–09	Fajr	Pro League	32	5	1	0	–		33	5
2009–10	Saipa	Pro League	29	4	1	0	–		30	4
2010–11	Saipa	Pro League	10	1	0	0	–		10	1
2011–12	Saipa	Pro League	4	0	1	0	–		5	0
2011–12	Sanat Naft	Pro League	9	2	0	0	–		9	2
2012–13	Sanat Naft	Pro League	17	2	0	0	–		17	2
2013–14	Rah Ahan	Pro League	28	2	2	2	–		30	4
2014–15	Rah Ahan	Pro League	11	1	2	0	–		13	1
2014–15	Persepolis	Pro League	10	0	1	0	3	0	14	0
2015–16	Persepolis	Pro League	8	0	0	0	–		8	0
2016–17	Gostaresh Foulad	Pro League	28	7	0	0	–		28	7
2017–18	Gostaresh Foulad	Pro League	17	8	0	0	–		17	8
2018–19	Machine Sazi	Pro League	7	4	1	0	–		8	4
2019–20	Pars jonoubi	Pro League	23	1	1	0	–		24	1
2020-21	Sanat naft	Pro League	13	4	0	0	–		13	4
Career total			297	48	11	2	3	0	312	50

- Assist Goals

Season	Team	Assists
06–07	Fajr	2
07–08	Fajr	3
08–09	Fajr	4
09–10	Saipa	6
10–11	Saipa	0
11–12	Saipa	0
11–12	Sanat Naft	1
12–13	Sanat Naft	0
13–14	Rah Ahan	4
14–15	Rah Ahan	1

Statistics accurate as of match played 31 July 2014
