= Sosha Makani =

Iranian footballer

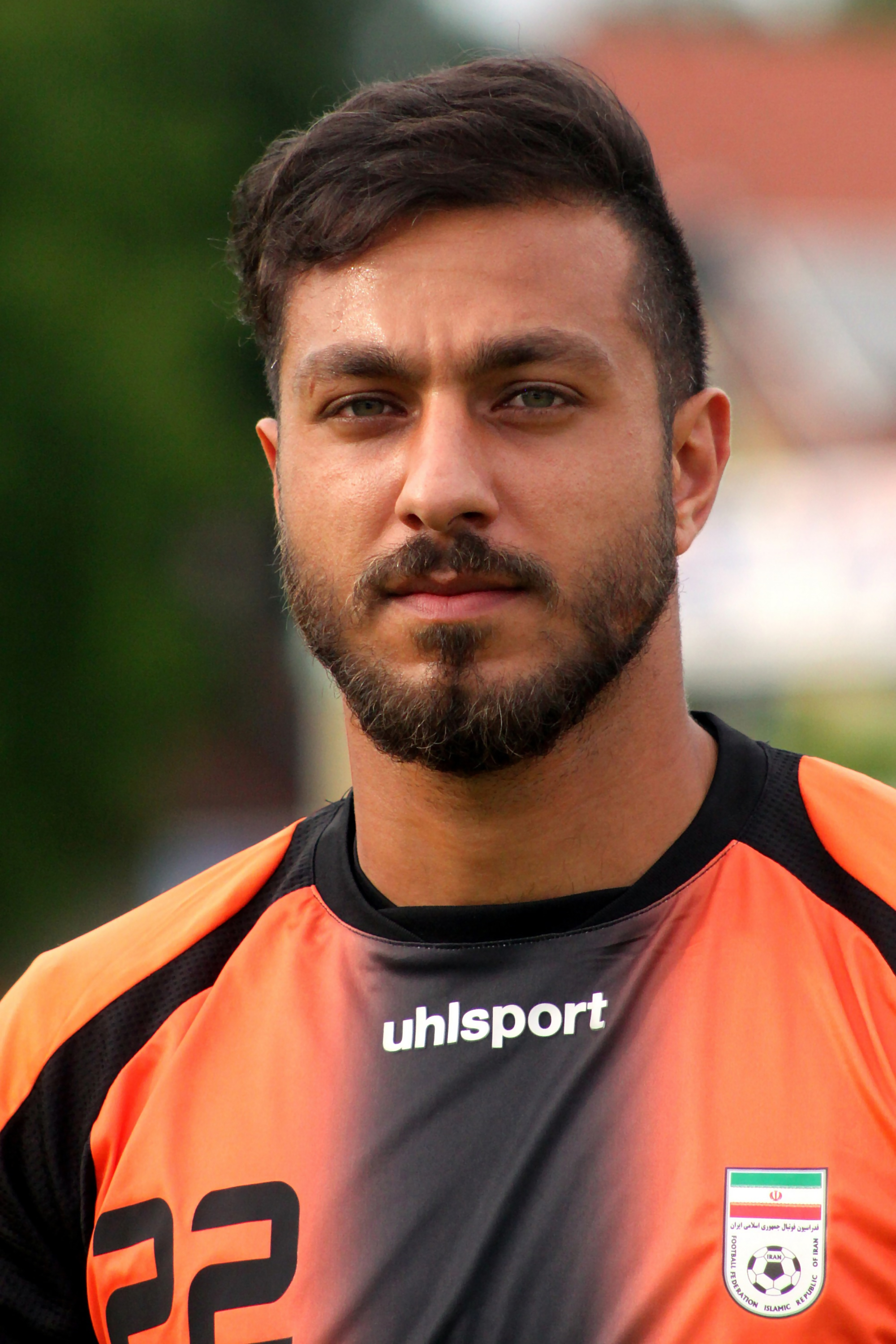

Personal information
- Full name: Sosha Makani
- Date of birth: November 18, 1986 (age 39)
- Place of birth: Bandar-e Anzali, Iran
- Height: 1.92 m (6 ft 3 1/2 in)
- Position: Goalkeeper

Youth career
- 2004–2006: Fajr Sepasi

Senior career*
Years	Team	Apps	(Gls)
2006–2008	Fajr Sepasi	42	(1)
2008–2010	Pas Hamedan	44	(0)
2010–2011	Steel Azin	10	(0)
2011–2013	Naft Tehran	57	(0)
2013–2014	Foolad	15	(0)
2014–2016	Persepolis	38	(0)
2016–2019	Mjøndalen	39	(0)
2017	→ Strømsgodset (loan)	1	(0)
2018	→ Sanat Naft (loan)	7	(0)
2019–2020	Naft MIS	11	(0)
2020–2023	Mjøndalen	90	(0)
2023	KFUM Oslo	0	(0)

International career^{‡}
2007	Iran U23	6	(0)
2012–2018	Iran	5	(0)
- * Club domestic league appearances and goals as of 7 July 2022 ‡ National team caps and goals as of 15 November 2016

Sosha Makani (Persian: سوشا مكانى; born 18 November 1986) is an Iranian former footballer who played as a goalkeeper. Makani also played for the Iran national football team.

== Club career ==
=== Fajr Sepasi ===
Makani started his career with Fajr Sepasi and stayed at the club for two seasons. He played 42 matches for the club and also scored a goal.

=== Pas Hamedan ===
He joined Pas Hamedan in the summer of 2008 and signed a two-year contract keeping him at the club until the end of the 2009–10 season. He ended up playing 44 games for the club.

=== Steel Azin ===
He joined Steel Azin in the summer of 2010 and signed a one-year contract keeping him at the club until the end of the 2010–11 season. He only featured in 10 games for the club.

=== Naft Tehran ===
He joined Naft Tehran in the summer of 2011 signing a three-year contract with the club keeping him there until the end of the 2013–14 season. He played 56 games for the club.

=== Foolad ===
Makani joined Foolad during the winter transfer window of the 2013–14 season. Makani helped Foolad win the 2013–14 Iran Pro League title, and also reach the knockout stages of the 2014 AFC Champions League.

=== Persepolis ===
After becoming the Pro League's champions with Foolad and also recording 13 clean sheets in 2013–14 Iran Pro League the fourth best in the league. Makani decided to join Persepolis in the summer of 2014 and signed a two-year contract keeping him at the club until the end of 2015–16 season. Makani became the starter for the club in the middle of the 2014–15 season after then-manager Hamid Derakhshan decided to sell Perspolis' first choice goalkeeper Nilson Correa Junior.

=== Mjøndalen ===
On 21 June 2016, Makani joined Mjøndalen for a one-week trial. After a successful trial Makani on 30 June 2016 signed a two-and-a-half-year contract with the club. Makani made his debut for Mjøndalen on 7 August 2016, keeping a clean sheet in a 0–0 draw at home against Ullensaker/Kisa.

=== Strømsgodset ===
On 25 January 2017, Makani signed for Strømsgodset on loan until 14 August 2017.

== International career ==
=== Under-23 ===
Makani has played 6 games for the Iran national under-23 football team.

=== Senior ===
In 2012 Makani was invited to the Iranian national team by Carlos Queiroz to play in the 2012 WAFF Championship.

Makani was suspended for the opening game against Nigeria in the 2014 FIFA World Cup after the World Cup qualifying post-match altercation against South Korea on 18 June 2013. He was selected in Iran's 30-man provisional squad for the 2014 FIFA World Cup by Queiroz. However, he was not included in the final list.

== Controversy ==
On 4 January 2016, Makani was arrested for posting pictures on social media that displayed two unveiled women. The photos were deemed to be anti-Islamic, and the arrest came following an alleged complaint by private plaintiffs. The official charge against Makani was, "publishing pictures that lead to the spread of corruption and prostitution in society". However, Makani's lawyer contested that his social media accounts had been hacked and that the information was posted by two other individuals. Makani was sent to Evin Prison but was released shortly later and returned to Persepolis training in early 2016. On 8 June 2016, Makani was suspended for six months from playing football by the Disciplinary Committee.

== Club career statistics ==
As of 21 August 2021

Club	Division	Season	League		Cup		Continental		Other		Total	
Club	Division	Season	Apps	Goals	Apps	Goals	Apps	Goals	Apps	Goals	Apps	Goals
Fajr Sepasi	Pro League	2006–07	18	0	0	0	—		—		18	0
Fajr Sepasi	Pro League	2007–08	24	1	0	0	—		—		24	1
Fajr Sepasi	Fajr Sepasi total		42	1	0	0	—		—		42	1
Pas Hamedan	Pro League	2008–09	15	0	4	0	—		—		19	0
Pas Hamedan	Pro League	2009–10	29	0	0	0	—		—		29	0
Pas Hamedan	Pas Hamedan total		44	0	4	0	—		—		48	0
Steel Azin	Pro League	2010–11	10	0	0	0	—		—		10	0
Naft Tehran	Pro League	2011–12	32	0	0	0	—		—		32	0
Naft Tehran	Pro League	2012–13	18	0	0	0	—		—		18	0
Naft Tehran	Pro League	2013–14	7	0	2	0	—		—		9	0
Naft Tehran	Naft Tehran total		57	0	2	0	—		—		59	0
Foolad	Pro League	2013–14	15	0	2	0	7	0	—		24	0
Persepolis	Pro League	2014–15	20	0	4	0	8	0	—		32	0
Persepolis	Pro League	2015–16	18	0	2	0	—		—		20	0
Persepolis	Persepolis total		38	0	6	0	8	0	—		52	0
Mjøndalen	OBOS-ligaen	2016	12	0	0	0	—		1	0	13	0
Strømsgodset (loan)	Eliteserien	2017	1	0	0	0	—		—		1	0
Mjøndalen	OBOS-ligaen	2017	12	0	2	0	—		2	0	16	0
Sanat Naft (loan)	Pro League	2017-18	6	0	1	0	—		—		7	0
Mjøndalen	OBOS-ligaen	2018	10	0	0	0	—		—		10	0
Mjøndalen	Eliteserien	2019	0	0	0	0	—		—		0	0
Mjøndalen	Mjøndalen total		34	0	2	0	—		3	0	39	0
Naft Masjed Soleyman	Pro League	2019–20	11	0	0	0	—		—		11	0
Naft Masjed Soleyman	Naft Masjed total		11	0	0	0	—		—		11	0
Mjøndalen	Eliteserien	2020	30	0	0	0	—		—		30	0
Mjøndalen	Eliteserien	2021	30	0	0	0	—		—		30	0
Mjøndalen	Mjøndalen total		60	0	0	0	—		—		43	0
Career total			308	1	17	0	15	0	3	0	343	1

== Honours ==
Foolad

- Persian Gulf Pro League: 2013–14
