= Persepolis F.C. Academy =

- Full name: Persepolis Tehran Football Club Academy
- Ground: Derafshifar Stadium
- Owner: Persepolis Athletic and Cultural Club
- Director: (Iran) Peyman Haddadi
- Head Coach: (Iran) Esmail Halali (U-23) (Iran) Edmond Bezik (U-21) (Iran) Majid Parvin (U-19) (Iran) Reza Jabbari (U-16) (Iran) Hassan Khanmohammadi(U-14)
- League: AFC Vision Asia U-21 Tehran Premier League; AFC Vision Asia U-19 Tehran Premier League; AFC Vision Asia U-16 Tehran Premier League; AFC Vision Asia U-14 Tehran Premier League
Home colours	Away colours

Persepolis Football Club Academy are the youth team of Persepolis Football Club. They currently play in the AFC Vision Asia Youth Premier League, the highest level of youth football in Iran.

== The Academy ==
=== Current squad ===
Players in bold are National Player

==== U-21 ====
Position	Staff
Manager	Edmond Bezik
Assistant managers	Behrouz Rahbarifar; Saeed NaeemAbadi
Goalkeeping coach	Behrouz Soltani
Team manager	Yaqoub Fatemi Moghaddam

Last updated: 21 July 2015
Source: Varzesh3

- **Season: 2015–16 (Players born after 1995)**

Note: Flags indicate national team as defined under FIFA eligibility rules; some limited exceptions apply. Players may hold more than one non-FIFA nationality.

No.	Pos.	Nation	Player
1	GK	IRN	Reza Jahesh
2		IRN	Ali Taleshi
3	DF	IRN	Amir Hossein Neshatjou
4		IRN	Mohammadreza Hashemi
5		IRN	Abolfazl Zomorodi
6	DF	IRN	Yazdan Salmanian
7	MF	IRN	Iman Sarbazi
8	MF	IRN	Ehsan Sarbazi
9	MF	IRN	Hamidreza Ghaderi
10	MF	IRN	Navid Sodouri
11		IRN	Amin Rezaei
12	DF	IRN	Mohsen Nasiri
13		IRN	Mehdi Asadzadeh
14		IRN	Keyhan Hosseini
15		IRN	Reza Khorshidi
16		IRN	Mohammad Moghanlou

No.	Pos.	Nation	Player
17		IRN	Morteza Alizadeh
18		IRN	Pouya Esmaeili
19	FW	IRN	Amir Roustaei
20		IRN	Davoud Saadati
21		IRN	Peyman Gohari
22		IRN	Saeid Ghafari
23	MF	IRN	Nima Rahbarifard
24		IRN	Omidreza Abdollahi
27		IRN	Mehdi Tavakoli
29		IRN	Hossein Hosseini
30	GK	IRN	Nader Safarzaei
33		IRN	Ali Al-Ghosi
40	MF	IRN	Ebrahim Hassanzadeh
44	MF	IRN	Mohammad Khosravi
99		IRN	Omidreza Abdollahi

==== U-19 ====
Position	Staff
Manager	Majid Parvin
Assistant managers	Amir Jahangiri; Misagh Afraz
Goalkeeping coach	Behrouz Soltani
Team manager	Reza Riazati

Last updated: 21 July 2015
Source: Varzesh3

- **Season: 2016–17 (Players born after 1998)**

Note: Flags indicate national team as defined under FIFA eligibility rules; some limited exceptions apply. Players may hold more than one non-FIFA nationality.

No.	Pos.	Nation	Player
—		IRN	Mehran Malvandi
—		IRN	Arian Shaafi
—		IRN	Alireza Alipour
—		IRN	Amirhossein Jafari
—		IRN	Milad Toulaei
—		IRN	Ali Jafari
—		IRN	Hamed Yousefi
—		IRN	Mohammad Hossein Mirzaei
—		IRN	Amir Hossein Salehi
—		IRN	Reza Rezaei
—		IRN	Amir Hossein Aminzadeh
—		IRN	Hossein Shaabani

No.	Pos.	Nation	Player
—		IRN	Mohammadreza Hatami
—		IRN	Younes Izanlou
—		IRN	Sina Khoshdel
—		IRN	Soheyl Tehraninejad
—		IRN	Amir Roustaei
—		IRN	Taha Imani
—		IRN	Hossein Abarghouei
—		IRN	Sepehr Haghighat
—		IRN	Ali Hashemian
—		IRN	Saeid Ghaffari
—		IRN	Mehdi Ghorbanpour
—		IRN	Ali Fathollahzadeh
—		IRN	Ali Alghosi

==== U-16 ====
Position	Staff
Manager	Khalig Ibrahimov
Assistant managers	Faramar Mohze
Goalkeeping coach	Kati Naderi
Team manager	Pafsiz Gahri

Last updated: 21 July 2015
Source: Varzesh3

- **Season: 2021–22 (Players born after 2004/05)**

Note: Flags indicate national team as defined under FIFA eligibility rules; some limited exceptions apply. Players may hold more than one non-FIFA nationality.

No.	Pos.	Nation	Player
2	FW	IRN	Alifieza Khalghi
4	DF	IRN	Siavash Noudri
5	MF	IRN	Amir Shahbi
6	MF	IRN	Parham Zazi
7	FW	IRN	Ali Khoda
8	DF	IRN	Youzef Heidar
9	FW	IRN	Mehdi Shori
10	MF	IRN	Reza Kanshou
12	DF	IRN	Farshid Kanaani

No.	Pos.	Nation	Player
13	FW	IRN	Amir Hossein Maud
14	DF	IRN	Amir Botlakh
15	GK	IRN	Omid Iyad
16	FW	IRN	Khalig Khalmushfig
17	GK	IRN	Amir Hoszaei
18	FW	IRN	Mehdi Mamirzadeh
19	DF	IRN	Mohammad Rahman
20	MF	IRN	Ali Emdu
22	DF	IRN	Mohammad Emam
23	MF	IRN	Ahoura Havezi
30	DF	IRN	Feysolriza Ganmohammad
40	FW	IRN	Amir Moha

==== U-14 ====
Position	Staff
Manager	Morteza Fonounizadeh
Assistant managers	Najmedin Bakhshi
Goalkeeping coach	Nader Bagheri
Team manager	Parviz Jafari

Last updated: 21 July 2015
Source: Varzesh3

- **Season: 2015–16 (Players born after 2002)**

Note: Flags indicate national team as defined under FIFA eligibility rules; some limited exceptions apply. Players may hold more than one non-FIFA nationality.

No.	Pos.	Nation	Player
—		IRN	Alireza Khodaei
—		IRN	Hamidreza Nanakli
—		IRN	Alireza Khaleghi
—		IRN	Mehdi Mehri
—		IRN	Amir Mohammad Kharkesh
—		IRN	Alireza Molaei
—		IRN	Yousef Heydari
—		IRN	Soheil Sahraei
—		IRN	Mohammad Hossein Tavvakoli
—		IRN	Hossein Yousefli
—		IRN	Amir Hossein Haji Agha
—		IRN	Mohammad Jaberi

No.	Pos.	Nation	Player
—		IRN	Arshia Eftekhari
—		IRN	Mehdi Mardani
—		IRN	Mohammad Khoshhal
—		IRN	Amir Parsa Hassanpour
—		IRN	Mohammadreza Saeidi
—		IRN	Ehsan Mohammadi
—		IRN	Kousha Lashgari
—		IRN	Ali Abdi
—		IRN	Mohammad Abdi
—		IRN	Aria Taheri
—		IRN	Ali Molaei

== Former players ==
=== Significant Academy Products ===
==== Goalkeeper ====
- (Iran) Alireza Haghighi
- (Iran) Amir Abedzadeh
- (Iran) Mehrdad Tahmasbi
- (Iran) Morteza Ghadimipour
- (Iran) Mehrdad Hosseini
- (Iran) Nader Safarzaei
- (Iran) Abolfazl Darvishvand

==== Defender ====
- (Iran) Morteza Pouraliganji
- (Iran) Hadi Mohammadi
- (Iran) Milad Mohammadi
- (Iran) Navid Khosh Hava
- (Iran) Mohammad Nosrati
- (Iran) Hamed Noormohammadi
- (Iran) Mohammad Sattari
- (Iran) Morteza Asadi
- (Iran) Amir Abbas Ayenechi
- (Iran) Reza Abedian
- (Iran) Hadi Aghili
- (Iran) Ahmad Ahi
- (Iran) Hossein Kanaani
- (Iran) Saeid Ghadami
- (Iran) Ali Astani
- (Iran) Mobin Mirdoraghi
- (Iran) Shahin Abbasian
- (Iran) Ehsan Hosseini

==== Midfielder ====
- (Iran) Mohammad Parvin
- (Iran) Amir Hossein Amiri
- (Iran) Amir Hossein Feshangchi
- (Iran) Mohammad Mehdi Elhaei
- (Iran) Khosro Heydari
- (Iran) Siamak Nemati
- (Iran) Siavash Hagh Nazari
- (Iran) Amir Mohammad Madani
- (Iran) Ebrahim Asadi
- (Iran) Hossein Abdi
- (Iran) Ebrahim Sadeghi
- (Iran) Milad Nouri
- (Iran) Hamed Khosravi
- (Iran) Milad Kamandani
- (Iran) Mohammad Rahmati
- (Iran) Navid Sabouri
- (Iran) Hadi Mahdavikia
- (Iran) Hamed Kavianpour
- (Iran) Rouhollah Seifollahi
- (Iran) Afshin Esmaeilzadeh
- (Iran) Farshad Ahmadzadeh
- (Iran) Reza Shekari
- (Iran) Farshad Ghasemi
- (Cameroon) Jacques Elong Elong
- (Iran) Amir Hossein Tahuni
- (Iran) Hamidreza Taherkhani
- (Iran) Saeid Hosseinpour

==== Forward ====
- (Iran) Hadi Norouzi
- (Iran) Mehrdad Mohammadi
- (Iran) Mehrdad Oladi
- (Iran) Mohsen Bayatinia
- (Iran) Morteza Aghakhan
- (Iran) Mehrdad Bayrami
- (Iran) Sajjad Ashouri
- (Iran) Shahab Zahedi
- (Iran) Shahriar Moghanlou
- (Iran) Ehsan Khorsandi
- (Iran) Saeed Hallafi
- (Iran) Faraz Emamali
- (Iran) Ali Fatemi
- (Iran) Mohammad Amin Asadi
- (Iran) Ahmad Baharvand

=== Other Players promoted to first team ===
- (Iran) Javad Razzaghi
- (Iran) Ardalan Ashtiani
- (Iran) Meghdad Ghobakhlou
- (Iran) Ziaeddin Niknafs
- (Iran) Amirhossein Ipakchi
- (Iran) Mehran Farziat
- (Iran) Mohsen Eliasi
- (Iran) Masoud Dastani

== See also ==
Reserve teams

- Persepolis Qaem Shahr
- Shamoushak Noshahr
