= Morteza Ghadimipour =

Iranian footballer

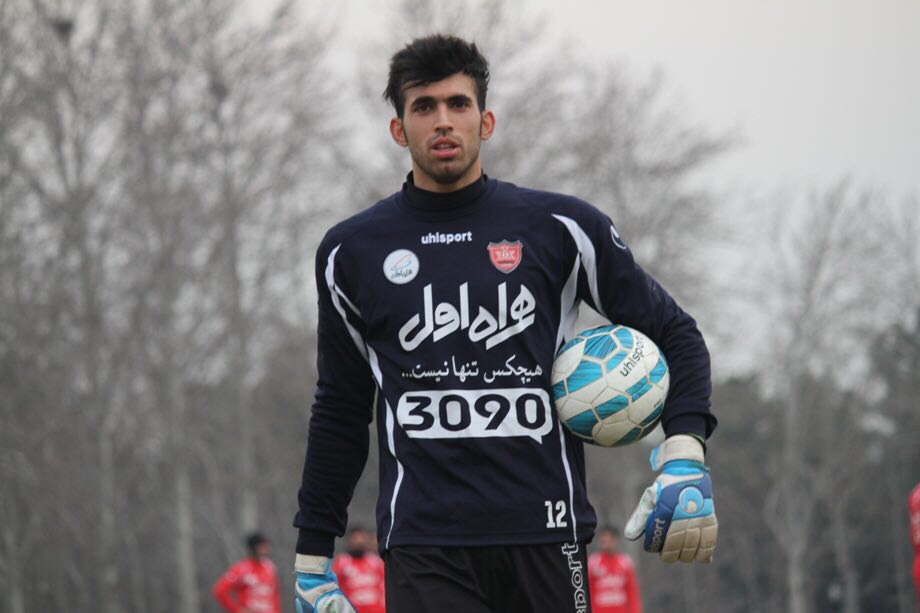

Personal information
- Date of birth: 27 August 1994 (age 32)
- Place of birth: Tehran, Iran
- Height: 1.89 m (6 ft 2 1/2 in)
- Position: Goalkeeper

Youth career
- 2011–2013: Esteghlal
- 2014–2015: Persepolis

Senior career*
| Years | Team | Apps | (Gls) |
| 2013–2014 | Parseh | 10 | (0) |
| 2014–2016 | Persepolis | 0 | (0) |
| 2016–2017 | Siah Jamegan | 1 | (0) |
| 2017–2018 | Caspian Amirabad | | |
| 2019–2021 | Parag Tehran | | |
| 2021–2023 | Maham | | |
| 2023–2024 | Khorshid Talaei | | |

International career^{‡}
| 2014–2015 | Iran U22 | 2 | (0) |
- * Club domestic league appearances and goals as of 4 May 2017 ‡ National team caps and goals as of 30 June 2015

Morteza Ghadimipour (Persian: مرتضی قدیمی پور; born 27 August 1994) is an Iranian footballer who plays as a goalkeeper.

== Club career ==
=== Youth teams ===
Ghadimipour was a member of the Esteghlal Youth Academy from 2011 to 2013.

=== Parseh Tehran ===
He joined Parseh in 2013–14 season.

=== Persepolis ===
He joined Persepolis in 2014–15 winter transfer with 2.5 years contracts. He play first game for Persepolis in Hazfi Cup.

=== Club career statistics ===
as of 6 November 2015.

CS = Clean Sheets

| Season | Club | League | League | | Cup | | Continental | | Total | |
| Season | Club | League | Apps | CS | Apps | CS | Apps | CS | Apps | CS |
|---|---|---|---|---|---|---|---|---|---|---|
| 2014–15 | Persepolis | Persian Gulf Pro League | 0 | 0 | 1 | 0 | 0 | 0 | 1 | 0 |
| Career Total | | | 0 | 0 | 1 | 0 | 0 | 0 | 1 | 0 |

== International career ==
Ghadimipour was once called up to Iran national under-17 football team's camp.
