= Ali Doustimehr =

Iranian football coach

Personal information
- Full name: Ali Doustimehr
- Date of birth: July 23, 1965 (age 61)
- Place of birth: Tehran, Iran

Managerial career
- Years: Team
- 1993–1994: Keshavarz (assistant)
- 1994: Keshavarz
- 1994–2000: Bank Melli
- 2000–2005: Iran U-17 (assistant)
- 2005–2008: Iran U-20 (assistant)
- 2008–2010: Iran U-20
- 2010–2013: Iran U-17
- 2013–2014: Iran U-19
- 2015–2016: KIA Academy

Ali Doustimehr (Persian: علی دوستی‌مهر, born 23 July 1965) is an Iranian football coach. He has been the head coach of Iran national under-19 football team participating in 2009 FIFA U-17 World Cup in Nigeria and is the coach for the 2010 AFC U-19 Championship.

In 2015, Doustimehr established the KIA Football Academy alongside Mehdi Mahdavikia.
