= 2014–15 Persepolis F.C. season =

Persepolis
2014–15 season
- Chairman: Alireza Rahimi (until September 10, 2014); Behrouz Montaghami (from September 10, 2014 to November 25, 2014); Hamid Reza Siasi (from November 25, 2014 to April 23, 2015); Mohammad Hossein Nejadfallah as Vice president in the absence of Chairman (from April 23, 2015 until end of the season)
- Manager: Ali Daei (until September 10, 2014); Hamid Derakhshan (from September 10, 2014 to April 5, 2015); Branko Ivanković (from April 5, 2015 until end of the season)
- Stadium: Azadi Stadium
- Iran Pro League: 8th
- Hazfi Cup: Semi-Final
- ACL: Round of 16
- Top goalscorer: League: Mehdi Taremi (7 goals); All: Mohammad Nouri (10 goals)
- Highest home attendance: League: 70,000 v Esteghlal (15 May 2015); All: 100,000 v Al Nassr (8 April 2015); 100,000 v Bunyodkor (6 May 2015); 100,000 v Al-Hilal (19 May 2015)
- Lowest home attendance: 1,000 v Kargar Boneh Gaz (16 October 2014)
- Average home league attendance: League: 15,768 All: 29,355
Home colours	Away colours

The 2014–15 season are the Persepolis's 14th season in the Pro League, and their 32nd consecutive season in the top division of Iranian Football. They were also competing in the Hazfi Cup & AFC Champions League. Persepolis is captained by Mohammad Nouri.

== Key events ==
- 22 May: The Club signed two-years contracts with two strikers. Mehdi Daghagheleh who scored 11 times in 2013–14 Iran Pro League signed from Malavan & Mehdi Taremi top scorer of 2013–14 Azadegan League with 12 goals from Iranjavan. Both of them joined club with free transfer fee.
- 24 May: Mohsen Bengar signed contract extension.
- 1 June: Jalal Hosseini, Hossein Mahini, Mehrdad Pouladi & Reza Haghighi chosen by Carlos Queiroz to taking part in 2014 FIFA World Cup.
- 8 June: The Club signed two-years contract with Goalkeeper. Sosha Makani who clean sheets 13 times in 2013–14 Iran Pro League signed from Foolad. joined club with free transfer fee.
- 10 June: The Club signed one-years contract with Forward. Reza Norouzi who scored 11 times in 2013–14 Iran Pro League signed from Naft Tehran. joined club with free transfer fee.
- 13 June: The Club signed three-years contract with Midfielder. Ahmad Nourollahi who scored 3 times in 2013–14 Azadegan League signed from Foolad Yazd. Nourollahi is the vice-captain in Iran U–23 after Alireza Jahanbakhsh.
- 3 July: Nilson Corrêa signed contract extension another one-years.
- 9 July: The Club signed three-years contract with 4 new talents. Nader Safarzaei, Navid Sabouri, Ali Astani, Ali Fatemi joined The Club after success in technical test.
- 17 August: The Club signed two-years contract with Defender. Michael Umaña playing for Costa Rica at the 2006 FIFA World Cup, 2014 FIFA World Cup joined club with free transfer fee.
- 10 September: Alireza Rahimi, Ali Daei & his staff sacked by club board of directions. Former Persepolis captain and coach, Hamid Derakhshan, assigned as new head coach while club deputy chairman, Behrouz Montaghami named as new chairman. Hossein Abdi, Alireza Emamifar and Nader Bagheri also assigned as club technical staff.
- 17 September: FFIRI disciplinary committee sentenced about Mehrdad Pouladi's contract with Persepolis for 2014–15 season. According to this sentence, contracted canceled after 2013–14 season ends (in May 2014), So Mehrdad Pouladi named as Free agent and free to choose his club.

== Squad ==
=== First team squad ===
No.	Name	Age	Nationality	Position (s)	Since	App	Goals	Assist	Ends	Signed from	Transfer fee	Notes
Goalkeepers
1	Sosha Makani	28	(Iran)	GK	2014	32		0	2016	Foolad	Free	
41	Morteza Ghadimipour	20	(Iran)	GK	2014	0	0	0	2017	Parseh	Free	U-21; Academy player
44	Masoud Homami	31	(Iran)	GK	2015	1		0	2016	Paykan	undisclosed	
Defenders
3	Mohammadreza Khanzadeh	23	(Iran)	CB / RB / LB	2012	39	0	4	2015	Rah Ahan	Free	
4	Michael Umaña	32	(Costa Rica)	CB / RB / DM	2014	34	0	0	2016	(Costa Rica) Saprissa	Free	
5	Mehdi Jafarpour	30	(Iran)	RB / RM / RW	2014	6	0	1	2016	Shahrdari Tabriz	Free	
6	Mohsen Bengar	35	(Iran)	CB	2012	90	4	2	2016	Sepahan	Free	
20	Alireza Nourmohammadi	33	(Iran)	CB / LB	2010	139	8	2	2015	Rah Ahan	Free	2nd Vice captain
29	Navid Sabouri	18	(Iran)	LB / LW	2014	0	0	0	2017	Rah Ahan	Free	U-21; Academy player
30	Mobin Mir Doraghi	31	(Iran)	LB / LM / LW	2015	0	0	0	2016	Saipa	Free	U-23; Originally from Academy
99	Babak Hatami	28	(Iran)	RB / RM / LB / CB	2015	17	0	0	2016	Saipa	R2 B	
Midfielders
14	Mohammad Nouri	31	(Iran)	AM / CM / DM	2010	180	41	18	2015	Saba Qom	Free	Captain
15	Afshin Esmaeilzadeh	22	(Iran)	CM / AM / DM	2012	7	0	0	2015	Damash	Free	U-23; Academy graduated
18	Mehrdad Kafshgari	27	(Iran)	DM / CM	2013	48	1	2	2016	Rah Ahan	Free	
19	Milad Kamandani	20	(Iran)	AM / CM / RM	2013	6	0	0	2016	Moghavemat Tehran	R600 M	U-21; Academy player
21	Ali Astani	17	(Iran)	AM / CM	2014	0	0	0	2017	Shahrdari Ardabil	Free	U-21; Academy player
26	Hamidreza Aliasgari	24	(Iran)	RM / RW / RB / LM / LW / LB	2007	140	8	9	2015	Fajr Sepah Tehran	Free	Academy graduated
28	Ahmad Nourollahi	21	(Iran)	DM / CM	2014	31	1	1	2017	Foolad Yazd	Free	U-23
34	Mohammad Rahmati	20	(Iran)	CM / DM	2015	0	0	0	2016	Academy	Free	U-21; Academy player
66	Fernando Gabriel	26	(Brazil)	CM / AM	2015	13	0	2	2016	(Azerbaijan) Khazar Lankaran	Free	
Forwards
2	Omid Alishah	22	(Iran)	LW / RW / LM / RM	2013	57	8	5	2015	Rah Ahan	Free	U-23
8	Mehdi Daghagheleh	24	(Iran)	SS / LW / RW / CF	2014	8	0	0	2016	Malavan	Free	
10	Reza Norouzi	32	(Iran)	CF	2014	4	1	0	2015	Naft Tehran	Free	
11	Payam Sadeghian	22	(Iran)	SS / AM / LW / RW	2013	41	5	8	2015	Zob Ahan	Free	U-23
16	Reza Khaleghifar	31	(Iran)	CF / SS / RW / LW / AM	2014	14	0	1	2015	Rah Ahan	Free	
17	Mehdi Taremi	22	(Iran)	CF / LW / RW	2014	38	8	7	2016	Iranjavan	Free	U-23
22	Tadeu	28	(Brazil)	CF	2015	5	1	0	2016	(Brazil) Náutico	Free	
23	Shahab Zahedi	19	(Iran)	LW / RW / CF	2014	5	0	0	2015	Paykan	Free	U-21; Academy player
24	Hadi Norouzi	29	(Iran)	SS / RW / LW / ST	2008	194	34	26	2015	Parseh	R1.5 B	Vice captain Originally from Academy
33	Mohammad Abbaszadeh	24	(Iran)	CF / LW	2013	34	12	0	2016	Nassaji	R4 B	
35	Amir Mohammad Madani	20	(Iran)	CF	2015	0	0	0	2017	Esteghlal Jonoub; Tehran	Free	U-21; Academy player
77	Ali Alipour	19	(Iran)	CF / RW / LW	2015	19	2	0	2017	Rah Ahan	Free	U-21
Players left the club during the season
9	Reza Haghighi	25	(Iran)	DM / CM	2013 (W)	61	3	2	Transferred to Padideh			
12	Meysam Hosseini	27	(Iran)	LB / CB / DM	2013	43	0	0	Released			
13	Hossein Mahini	28	(Iran)	RB / LB / RM	2012	68	2	8	2017	On loan at Malavan (Conscription Period)		
25	Farshad Ghasemi	21	(Iran)	RB / RM / RW	2013	2	0	0	Transferred to Saipa			
27	Ali Fatemi	21	(Iran)	RW / LW / CF	2014	2	0	0	Released			
35	Hossein Kanaani	20	(Iran)	CB / RB	2012	1	0	0	2017	On loan at Malavan (Conscription Period)		
40	Nilson Corrêa	39	(Brazil)	GK	2012	73	–47	0	Released			
	Nader Safarzaei	19	(Iran)	GK	2014	0	0	0	Released			

Apps and goals updated as of 26 May 2015

For more on the reserve and academy squads, see Persepolis Novin, Persepolis Academy, Persepolis Shomal & Persepolis Qaem Shahr.

Source: fc-perspolis.com, FFIRI.IR

==== Loan list ====
Note: Flags indicate national team as defined under FIFA eligibility rules; some limited exceptions apply. Players may hold more than one non-FIFA nationality.

No.	Pos.	Nation	Player
13	DF	IRI	Hossein Mahini (at Malavan till 9 November 2016)
35	DF	IRI	Hossein Kanaani ^{U23} (at Malavan till 9 November 2016)
—	MF	IRI	Farshad Ahmadzadeh ^{U23} (at Tractor Sazi till 15 Maytab 2015)
—	MF	IRI	Milad Gharibi ^{U23} (at Padideh till 15 May 2015)

For recent transfers, see List of Iranian football transfers summer 2014 & List of Iranian football transfers winter 2014–15.
For more on the reserve and academy squads, see Persepolis Novin, Persepolis Academy, Persepolis Shomal & Persepolis Qaem Shahr.

== New Contracts ==
No	P	Name	Age	Contract length	Contract ends	Date	Source
6	CB	(Iran) Mohsen Bengar	34	2 years	2016	24 May 2014	
40	GK	(Brazil) Nilson	38	1 year	2015	3 July 2014	

== Transfers ==
=== In ===
No	P	Name	Age	Moving from	Ends	Transfer fee	Type	Transfer window	Quota	Source
3	CB	Mohammadreza Khanzadeh	23	Zob Ahan	2015	N/A	Loan return	Summer		
17	CF	Younes Shakeri	24	Padideh	2016	N/A	Loan return	Summer		
22	RW	Milad Gharibi	22	Zob Ahan	2015	N/A	Loan return	Summer		
24	SS	Hadi Norouzi	28	Naft Tehran	2015	N/A	Loan return	Summer		
15	AM	Afshin Esmaeilzadeh	22	(Portugal) Beira-Mar	2015	N/A	Loan return	Summer		
8	RW	Mehdi Daghagheleh	24	Malavan	2016	—	Free Transfer	Summer	PL	
17	CF	Mehdi Taremi	21	Iranjavan	2016	Free	Transfer	Summer		
1	GK	Sosha Makani	27	Foolad	2016	—	Free Transfer	Summer	PL	
10	CF	Reza Norouzi	31	Naft Tehran	2015	—	Free Transfer	Summer	PL	
28	DM	Ahmad Nourollahi	21	Foolad Yazd	2017	Free	Transfer	Summer		
23	GK	Nader Safarzaei	19	Rah Ahan	2017	Free	Transfer	Summer		
29	LB	Navid Sabouri	18	Rah Ahan U19	2017	Free	Transfer	Summer		
21	CM	Ali Astani	17	Shahrdari Ardabil	2017	Free	Transfer	Summer		
27	LW	Ali Fatemi	20	Rah Ahan U21	2017	Free	Transfer	Summer		
4	CB	(Costa Rica) Michael Umaña	32	(Costa Rica) Saprissa	2016	—	Free Transfer	Summer	FA	
23	LW	Shahab Zahedi	19	Persepolis U21	2015	Free	promoted	Winter (during first half season)		
5	RB	Mehdi Jafarpour	30	Shahrdari Tabriz	2015	Free	Free Transfer	Winter(during first half season)	FA	
16	SS	Reza Khaleghifar	32	Rah Ahan	2015	Free	Free Transfer	Winter		
41	GK	Morteza Ghadimipour	20	Persepolis U21	2017	Free	promoted	Winter		
22	CF	(Brazil) Tadeu	28	(Brazil) Náutico	2016	—	Free Transfer	Winter		
44	GK	Masoud Homami	31	Paykan	2016	undisclosed	Transfer	Winter		
99	RB	Babak Hatami	28	Saipa	2016	R2 B	Transfer	Winter		
30	LB	Mobin Mir Doraghi	21	Saipa	2016	Free	Transfer	Winter		
77	CF	Ali Alipour	19	Rah Ahan	2017	Free	Transfer	Winter		
66	AM	(Brazil) Gabriel	26	(Azerbaijan) Khazar Lankaran	2016	Free	Free	Winter		
34	CM	Mohammad Rahmati	20	Persepolis U21	2016	Free	promoted	Winter		
35	CF	Amir Mohammad Madani	20	Persepolis U21	2016	Free	promoted	Winter		

=== Out ===
No	P	Name	Age	Moving to	Transfer fee	Type	Transfer window	Source
77	AM	Mohsen Mosalman	23	Zob Ahan	N/A	Loan return	Summer	
17	CF	Younes Shakeri	24	Padideh	undisclosed	Transfer	Summer	
22	RW	Milad Gharibi	22	Padideh	undisclosed	Loan	Summer	
5	DM	Ghasem Dehnavi	33	Zob Ahan	—	Free Transfer	Summer	
15	CB	Hossein Kanaani	20	Malavan	—	Loan	Summer	
21	GK	Amir Abedzadeh	21	Rah Ahan	Free (Mutual contest)	Transfer	Summer	
23	CF	Mehdi Seyed Salehi	32	Saipa	Free (Mutual contest)	Transfer	Summer	
1	GK	Reza Mohammadi	28	Naft Masjed Soleyman	Free (Mutual contest)	Transfer	Summer	
64	CF	Farzad Hatami	28	Mes Kerman	–	Free Transfer	Summer	
99	RW	Mohammadreza Khalatbari	30	Sepahan	Free (Mutual contest)	Transfer	Summer	
4	CB	Jalal Hosseini	32	(Qatar) Al Ahli	—	Free Transfer	Summer	
16	LB	Mehrdad Pooladi	27	(Qatar) Al-Shahania	—	Free Transfer	Summer	
23	GK	Nader Safarzaei	19	Released			Winter	
13	RB	Hossein Mahini	28	Malavan	undisclosed	Loan (Conscription Period)	Winter	
9	DM	Reza Haghighi	25	Padideh	Free (Mutual contest)	Transfer	Winter	
25	RB	Farshad Ghasemi	21	Saipa	Free (Mutual contest)	Transfer	Winter	
12	LB	Meysam Hosseini	30	Released			Winter	
27	RW	Ali Fatemi	21	Released			Winter	
40	GK	(Brazil) Nilson	39	Released			Winter	

== Technical staff ==
=== Ivanković's staff ===
Position	Staff
Head coach	(Croatia) Branko Ivanković
Assistant coach	(Croatia) Andrej Panadić
Assistant coach	(Iran) Karim Bagheri
Physical fitness trainer	(Croatia) Tihomir Sadibasic
Goalkeeping coach	(Croatia) Igor Panadić
Doctor	(Iran) Dr. Alireza Haghighat
Spokesman	(Iran) Hossein Ghodousi
Media Officer	(Iran) Pendar Khomarlou ^{ACL} (Iran) Hossein Khabiri ^{PGPL}
Team Manager	(Iran) Mahmoud Khordbin

=== Derakhshan's staff ===
Position	Staff
Head coach	(Iran) Hamid Derakhshan
Assistant coach	(Iran) Hossein Abdi
First Team coach	(Iran) Alireza Emamifar
Physical fitness trainer	(Iran) Masoud Momeni
Goalkeeping coach	(Iran) Nader Bagheri
Doctor	(Iran) Mahyar Mortazavi ^{Until January}
Spokesman	(Iran) Hossein Ghodousi
Media Officer	(Iran) Mojtaba Janali ^{Until January} (Iran) Pendar Khomarlou ^{ACL} (Iran) Hossein Khabiri ^{PGPL}
Team Manager	(Iran) Mahmoud Khordbin

=== Daei's staff ===
Position	Staff
Head coach	(Iran) Ali Daei
Assistant coach	(Iran) Afshin Peyrovani
First Team coach	(Iran) Reza Forouzani
First Team coach	(Iran) Mohammad Daei
Physical fitness trainer	(Iran) Mohammad Reza Molaei
Goalkeeping coach	(Iran) Behzad Gholampour
Analyst	(Iran) Javad Manafi
Doctor	(Iran) Dr Alireza Haghighat
Physiotherapists	(Iran) Meysam Alipour
Psychologist	(Iran) Mehdi Khanban
Media Officer	(Iran) Reza Abbasi
Team Manager	(Iran) Mohammad Panjali

== Competitions ==
=== Overview ===
Competition	First match	Last match	Starting round	Final position	Record							
Competition	First match	Last match	Starting round	Final position	Pld	W	D	L	GF	GA	GD	Win %
PGPL	1 August 2014	15 May 2015	Matchday 1	8th Place	30	9	9	12	31	35	−4	30.00
Hazfi Cup	16 October 2014	5 December 2014	Round of 16	Semi Final	4	1	2	1	6	4	+2	25.00
2015 ACL	24 February 2015	26 May 2015	Group stage	Round of 16	8	5	0	3	8	10	−2	62.50
Total					42	15	11	16	45	49	−4	35.71

Last updated: 26 May 2015
Source: Competitions

=== Persian Gulf Pro League ===
==== Standings ====
Pos	Team	Pld	W	D	L	GF	GA	GD	Pts
6	Esteghlal	30	13	8	9	40	34	+6	47
7	Saipa	30	11	8	11	36	34	+2	41
8	Persepolis	30	9	9	12	31	35	−4	36
9	Saba Qom	30	8	10	12	25	34	−9	34
10	Padideh	30	6	15	9	23	25	−2	33

Updated to match(es) played on 15 May 2015. Source: FIFA.com
Rules for classification: 1) points; 2) goal difference; 3) number of goals scored.

==== Results summary ====
Overall								Home						Away					
Pld	W	D	L	GF	GA	GD	Pts	W	D	L	GF	GA	GD	W	D	L	GF	GA	GD
30	9	9	12	31	35	−4	36	4	6	5	15	17	−2	5	3	7	16	18	−2

Last updated: 15 May 2015.
Source: Ipl Stats

==== Results by round ====
Round	1	2	3	4	5	6	7	8	9	10	11	12	13	14	15	16	17	18	19	20	21	22	23	24	25	26	27	28	29	30
Ground	H	A	H	A	H	A	H	H	A	H	A	H	A	H	A	A	H	A	H	A	H	A	A	H	A	H	A	H	A	H
Result	D	L	W	L	D	W	L	D	W	W	L	L	W	D	W	L	L	L	L	W	D	L	D	D	D	L	D	W	L	W
Position	5	13	8	11	12	7	9	9	8	8	9	9	8	8	7	8	8	9	10	9	9	9	9	9	9	9	10	9	9	8

Updated to match(es) played on 15 May 2015. Source: "Ipl".
A = Away; H = Home; W = Win; D = Draw; L = Loss

==== Matches ====
Win Draw Loss Postponed

Date Round	Home	Score	Away	Location

1 August 2014 1	Persepolis	1 – 1	Naft Tehran	Tehran
19:40 DST+03:30	P. Sadeghian 11'; M. Bengar (yellow card) 74'; M. Kafshgari (yellow card) 84' (yellow-red card) 90+3'	Summary; Stats; Live TV: IRIB TV3 / Jame Jam 2	Gh. Rezaei 27'; S. Kouroshi (yellow card) 51'; M. Hajmohammadi (yellow card) 60' (yellow-red card) 87'	Stadium: Azadi Stadium; Attendance: 18,000; Referee: Ahmad Salehi

7 August 2014 2	Foolad	2 – 0	Persepolis	Ahvaz
19:30 DST+03:30	S. Rafiei 45'; E. Sharifat 52'; A. Vali (yellow card) 88'	Summary; Stats; Live TV: IRIB TV3 / Jame Jam 2	M. Khanzadeh (yellow card) 21'; H. Aliasgari (yellow card) 35'; R. Haghighi (yellow card) 47'; A. Nourollahi (yellow card) 50'; A. Nourmohammadi (yellow card) 75'; P. Sadeghian (red card) 85'; M. Bengar (yellow card) 86'	Stadium: Ghadir Stadium; Attendance: 11,000; Referee: Mohammadreza Akbarian

15 August 2014 3	Persepolis	1 – 0	Zob Ahan	Tehran
19:20 DST+03:30	M. Kafshgari (yellow card) 41'; A. Nourmohammadi (yellow card) 58'; M. Taremi 71'	Summary; Stats; Live TV: IRIB TV3 / Jame Jam 2	Gh. Dehnavi (yellow card) 4'	Stadium: Azadi Stadium; Attendance: 15,000; Referee: Touraj Haghverdi

20 August 2014 4	Malavan	2 – 1	Persepolis	Bandar-e Anzali
18:00 DST+03:30	M. Oladi 5'; S. Yousefzadeh (yellow card) 38'; M. Yousefi 43'; H. Kanaani (yellow card) 90+3'	Summary; Stats; Live TV: IRIB TV3 / Jame Jam 2	R. Norouzi 18' (pen.); R. Haghighi (yellow card) 46'; Nilson (yellow card) 50'	Stadium: Takhti Stadium; Attendance: 10,000; Referee: Hossein Zargar

25 August 2014 5	Persepolis	1 – 1	Padideh	Tehran
19:10 DST+03:30	A. Nourmohammadi (yellow card) 14'; M. Abbaszadeh 76' (pen.)	Summary; Stats; Live TV: IRIB TV3 / Jame Jam 2	M. Nejad Mehdi (yellow card) 5'; M. Gharibi 38'; I. Prahić (yellow card) 40'; V. Asgari (yellow card) 74'	Stadium: Azadi Stadium; Attendance: 7,000; Referee: Alireza Faghani

30 August 2014 6	Saba Qom	0 – 2	Persepolis	Qom
19:00 DST+03:30	A. Achille (yellow card) 90'	Summary; Stats; Live TV: IRIB TV3 / Jame Jam 2	O. Alishah 5' (yellow card) 85'; M. Nouri (yellow card) 37'; M. Taremi 60' (yellow card) 62'	Stadium: Yadegar-e Emam Stadium; Attendance: 10,610; Referee: Alborz Hajipour

5 September 2014 7	Persepolis	1 – 3	Tractor Sazi	Tehran
18:50 DST+03:30	M. Bengar 39'; H. Mahini (yellow card) 73'	Summary; Stats; Live TV: IRIB TV3 / Jame Jam 2	Kh. Shafiei (yellow card) 12'; M. Kiani (yellow card) 66'; S. Makani 68' (o.g.); M. Dalir (yellow card) 73'; Edinho 85'; S. Nariman Jahan 90+2'	Stadium: Azadi Stadium; Attendance: 35,000; Referee: Ahmad Salehi

12 September 2014 8	Persepolis	1 – 1	Naft Masjed Soleyman	Tehran
19:45 DST+03:30	M. Bengar (yellow card) 28'; H. Norouzi 57'; H. Aliasgari (yellow card) 81'	Summary; Stats; Live TV: IRIB TV3 / Jame Jam 2	K. Cheraghi 3'; H. Mahmoudi (yellow card) 36'; M. Soleiman Fallah (yellow card) 59'; S. Salarzadeh (yellow card) 77'	Stadium: Azadi Stadium; Attendance: 11,000; Referee: Hossein Zargar

18 September 2014 9	Rah Ahan	1 – 2	Persepolis	Tehran
18:30 DST+03:30	S. Koohnavard (yellow card) 29'; M. Shiri 85'	Summary; Stats; Live TV: IRIB TV3 / Jame Jam 2	M. Abbaszadeh 18'; M. Nouri 27'; H. Mahini (yellow card) 60'	Stadium: Takhti Stadium; Attendance: 6,000; Referee: Mehdi Seyed Ali

25 September 2014 10	Persepolis	2 – 1	Esteghlal Khuzestan	Tehran
18:30 DST+03:30	M. Abbaszadeh 31', 45+1' (pen.)	Summary; Stats; Live TV: IRIB TV3 / Jame Jam 2	M. Momeni 13'; A. Khanifar (yellow card); M. Heidari (yellow card) 73'; S. Coulibaly (yellow card) 90+3'	Stadium: Azadi Stadium; Attendance: 13,246; Referee: Gholamreza Jabbari
Note: Abdolhadi Khanifar booked after half time whistle.

3 October 2014 11	Sepahan	1 – 0	Persepolis	Fooladshahr
18:30 DST+03:30	L. Pereira (yellow card) 24'; M. Sharifi 90+4' (yellow card) 90+5'	Summary; Stats; Live TV: Live TV: IRIB TV3 / Jame Jam 2	A. Nourmohammadi (yellow card) 17'; R. Haghighi (yellow card) 64'	Stadium: Foolad Shahr Stadium; Attendance: 13,500; Referee: Alireza Faghani

21 October 2014 12	Persepolis	0 – 1	Saipa	Tehran
16:50 DST+03:30	M. Khanzadeh (yellow card) 28'; A. Esmaeilzadeh (yellow card) 68'	Summary; Stats; Live TV: None	M. Ayoubi (yellow card) 33'; E. Sadeghi (yellow card) 58'; M. Meydavoudi 60'; M. Akhbari (yellow card) 90+3'	Stadium: Azadi Stadium; Attendance: 4,500; Referee: Touraj Haghverdi

30 October 2014 13	Paykan	0 – 1	Persepolis	Tehran
15:15 DST+03:30	A. Feshangchi (yellow card) 52'; Ali Hosseini (yellow card) 61'	Summary; Stats; Live TV: None	H. Norouzi (yellow card) 37'; M. Nouri 75' (yellow card) 42'; M. Bengar (yellow card) 84'	Stadium: Takhti Stadium; Attendance: 10,330; Referee: Ahmad Salehi

6 November 2014 14	Persepolis	2 – 2	Gostaresh	Tehran
16:30 DST+03:30	M. Bengar 7'; M. Umaña (yellow card) 24' (penalty missed) 87'; M. Taremi 29'	Summary; Stats; Live TV: IRIB TV3 / Jame Jam 2	M. Batista 37' (pen.); M. Jahani 72'	Stadium: Azadi Stadium; Attendance: 4,000; Referee: Mehdi Seyed Ali
Note: Persepolis first team coach Hossein Abdi expelled on 84'.

23 November 2014 15	Esteghlal	1 – 2	Persepolis	Tehran
18:05 DST+03:30	S. Shahbazzaadeh 44'; A. Teymourian (yellow card) 63'; M. Fakhreddini (yellow card) 78'	Summary; Stats; Live TV: IRIB TV3 / Jame Jam 2	M. Bengar (yellow card) 54'; M. Nouri 74' (yellow card) 74'; O. Alishah 82' (yellow card) 78' (yellow-red card) 82'; Nilson C. (yellow card) 90'; M. Taremi (yellow card) 90+6'	Stadium: Azadi Stadium; Attendance: 67,000; Referee: Yadollah Jahanbazi

1 December 2014 16	Naft Tehran	2 – 1	Persepolis	Tehran
16:15 DST+03:30	Gh. Rezaei 43'; M. Hajmohammadi (yellow card) 44'; K. Kamyabinia (yellow card) 67'; A. Motahari 90+2'	Summary; Stats; Live TV: IRIB TV3 / Jame Jam 2	M. Umaña (yellow card) 24'; M. Khanzadeh (yellow card) 45'; M. Abbaszadeh 78'	Stadium: Takhti Stadium; Attendance: 7,000; Referee: Ahmad Salehi

11 December 2014 17	Persepolis	1 – 2	Foolad	Tehran
14:15 DST+03:30	M. Bengar (yellow card) 16'; M. Nouri 42' (yellow card) 90+3'	Summary; Stats; Live TV: IRIB TV3 / Jame Jam 2	M. Bengar 1' (o.g.); L. Mesarić (yellow card) 22' (yellow-red card) 90+3'; E. Sharifat (yellow card) 28'; O. Khaledi (yellow card) 34'; A. Nong 71'	Stadium: Azadi Stadium; Attendance: N/A; Referee: Mehdi Seyed Ali

30 January 2015 18	Zob Ahan	1 – 0	Persepolis	Fooladshahr
14:30 DST+03:30	M. Taremi (yellow card) 49'; M. Nouri (yellow card) 57'	Summary; Stats; Live TV: IRIB TV3 / Jame Jam 2	A. Hamam (yellow card) 33'; M. Hassanzadeh 82'; K. Rezaei (yellow card) 83'	Stadium: Foolad Shahr Stadium; Attendance: 4,000; Referee: Mohammadreza Akbarian

6 February 2015 19	Persepolis	0 – 1	Malavan	Tehran
17:05 DST+03:30	O. Alishah (yellow card) 23'; H. Aliasgari (yellow card) 52'	Summary; Stats; Live TV: IRIB TV3 / Jame Jam 2	P. Nouri 18'; M. Abshak (yellow card) 73'; M. Zare (yellow card) 80'; I. Sadeghi (red card) 86'	Stadium: Azadi Stadium; Attendance: 8,000; Referee: Mohsen Torki

13 February 2015 20	Padideh	0 – 1	Persepolis	Mashhad
15:00 DST+03:30		Summary; Stats; Live TV: IRIB TV3 / Jame Jam 2	M. Bengar (yellow card) 42'; M. Nouri (yellow card) 44'; O. Alishah 76'; S. Makani (yellow card) 86'	Stadium: Samen Stadium; Attendance: 30,000; Referee: Alireza Faghani

19 February 2015 21	Persepolis	0 – 0	Saba Qom	Tehran
17:15 DST+03:30	A. Nourmohammadi (yellow card) 21'	Stats; Summary; Live TV: IRIB TV3 / Jame Jam 2	H. Badamaki (yellow card) 26'; S. Mehdipour (yellow card) 53'; M. Heidari (yellow card) 85'	Stadium: Azadi Stadium; Attendance: 5,000; Referee: Hossein Zargar

8 March 2015 22	Tractor Sazi	1 – 0	Persepolis	Tabriz
16:30 DST+03:30	Sh. Saghebi 62'; F. Abedini (yellow card) 84'; Edinho (yellow card) 90+5'	Stats; Summary; Live TV: IRIB TV3 / Jame Jam 2	M. Umaña (yellow card) 32'; F. Gabriel (yellow card) 34'; M. Nouri (yellow card) 84'; M. Bengar (yellow card) 88'; P. Sadeghian (yellow card) 89'	Stadium: Sahand Stadium; Referee: Yadollah Jahanbazi; Man of the Match: 30,178

12 March 2015 23	Naft Masjed Soleyman	2 – 2	Persepolis	Masjed Soleyman
14:30 DST+03:30	K. Amraei 44'; R. Melziddinov (red card) 57'; J. Abdi (yellow card) 83'; K. Cheraghi (yellow card) 89'; R. Karmolachaab 90+4' (yellow card) 90+1'	Stats; Summary; Live TV: IRIB TV3 / Jame Jam 2	M. Khanzadeh (yellow card) 6'; O. Alishah 24'; A. Alipour 37' (yellow card) 38'	Stadium: Behnam Mohammadi Stadium; Attendance: 10,000; Referee: Alireza Faghani

3 April 2015 24	Persepolis	2 – 2	Rah Ahan	Tehran
16:45 DST+03:30	B. Hatami (yellow card) 37'; M. Taremi 77'; A. Alipour (yellow card) 90'; M. Nouri 90+2'	Stats; Summary; Live TV: IRIB TV3 / Jame Jam 2	E. Karimi (red card) 16'; R. Rezaeian 38'; I. Nenezić (yellow card) 68'; A. Manouchehri 78'	Stadium: Azadi Stadium; Attendance: 5,000; Referee: Ahmad Salehi

12 April 2015 25	Esteghlal Khuzestan	1 – 1	Persepolis	Ahvaz
19:00 DST+03:30	M. Coulibaly (yellow card) 42'; M. Mahdavi 84'	Stats; Summary; Live TV: IRIB TV3 / Jame Jam 2	M. Taremi 47'; O. Alishah (yellow card) 59'; H. Aliasgari (yellow card) 74'; P. Sadeghian (yellow card) 80'	Stadium: Takhti Stadium; Attendance: 6,000; Referee: Yadollah Jahanbazi
Note: Andrej Panadić coached Persepolis temporary.

16 April 2015 26	Persepolis	1 – 2	Sepahan	Tehran
19:00 DST+03:30	H. Norouzi 44' (red card); M. Taremi (yellow card) 53'; A. Alipour (yellow card) 90+5'	Stats; Summary; Live TV: IRIB TV3 / Jame Jam 2	E. Hajisafi (yellow card) 59'; V. Ghafouri (yellow card) 78'; M. Sharifi 84'; X. Sukaj (yellow card) 85'; L. Pereira 90+3'	Stadium: Azadi Stadium; Attendance: 20,000; Referee: Mohammadreza Akbarian
Note: Hadi Norouzi sent off after the finish whistle. Xhevahir Sukaj booked on bench. Mehdi Taremi's yellow card forgiven in May 2015.

27 April 2015 27	Saipa	2 – 2	Persepolis	Karaj
17:30 DST+03:30	H. Nassari 45'; S. Moshkelpour (yellow card) 59'; H. Shiri 66' (pen.); M. Ayoubi (yellow card) 71'; M. Torabi (yellow card) 82'; M. Ramezani (yellow card) 90+2'	[ Summary] Stats; Live TV: IRIB TV3 / Jame Jam 2	A. Nourollahi 30'; M. Taremi 39'; B. Hatami (yellow card) 56'; M. Kafshgari (yellow card) 90+2'; A. Nourmohammadi (yellow card) 90+3'; S. Makani (yellow card) 90+4'	Stadium: Enghelab Stadium; Attendance: 8,000; Referee: Mohsen Torki

1 May 2015 28	Persepolis	1 – 0	Paykan	Tehran
18:00 DST+03:30	M. Taremi 55'; A. Nourmohammadi (yellow card) 90+2'	[ Summary] Stats; Live TV: IRIB TV3 / Jame Jam 2	J. Samuel (yellow card) 8'; Dodó (yellow card) 38'	Stadium: Azadi Stadium; Attendance: 5,000; Referee: Hossein Zargar

11 May 2015 29	Gostaresh	2 – 1	Persepolis	Tabriz
18:00 DST+03:30	J. Ansari 13', 50'; M. Asadi (yellow card) 21'	Stats; Summary; Live TV: IRIB TV3 / Jame Jam 2	M. Jafarpour (yellow card) 36'; Tadeu 89' (pen.)	Stadium: Gostaresh Foulad Stadium; Attendance: 1,000; Referee: Ahmad Salehi

15 May 2015 30	Persepolis	1 – 0	Esteghlal	Tehran
17:00 DST+03:30	M. Taremi (yellow card) 62'; A. Alipour 65'; B. Hatami (yellow card) 84'; H. Aliasgari (yellow card) 89'	Stats; Summary; Live TV: IRIB TV3 / Jame Jam 2	H. Omranzadeh (yellow card) 33'; A. Sadeghi (yellow card) 65'; B. Barzay (yellow card) 77'	Stadium: Azadi Stadium; Attendance: 70,000; Referee: Touraj Haghverdi

==== Score overview ====
Win Draw Loss

Opposition	Home score	Away score	Aggregate score
Esteghlal	1–0	1–2	3–1
Esteghlal Khuzestan	2–1	1–1	3–2
Foolad	1–2	2–0	1–4
Gostaresh Foulad	2–2	2–1	3–4
Malavan	0–1	2–1	1–3
Naft Masjed Soleyman	1–1	2–2	3–3
Naft Tehran	1–1	2–1	2–3
Padideh	1–1	0–1	2–1
Paykan	1–0	0–1	2–0
Rah Ahan	2–2	1–2	4–3
Saba	0–0	0–2	2–0
Saipa	0–1	2–2	2–3
Sepahan	1–2	1–0	1–3
Tractor	1–3	1–0	1–4
Zob Ahan	1–0	1–0	1–1

=== Hazfi Cup ===
Win Draw Loss Postponed

Date Round	Home	Score	Away	Location

16 October 2014 Round of 32	Persepolis	3 – 0	Kagar Boneh Gaz	Tehran
16:50 DST+03:30	M. Abbaszadeh 15' (penalty missed) 50'; M. Nouri (yellow card) 40'; P. Sadeghian 77' (pen.); O. Alishah 85'	Summary; Stats; Live TV: IRIB TV3 / Jame Jam 2	M. Ansarifard (yellow card) 41'; M. Soleymani (yellow card) 49'	Stadium: Azadi Stadium; Attendance: 1,000; Referee: Bijan Heydari

26 October 2014 Round of 16	Persepolis	1 – 1 (a.e.t.) (4 – 1 p)	Rah Ahan	Tehran
16:50 DST+03:30	P. Sadeghian (penalty missed) 5'; M. Nouri 49'; H. Norouzi (yellow card) 107'; M. Bengar (yellow card) 117'	Summary; Stats; Live TV: None	M. Mohammadi 38'	Stadium: Azadi Stadium; Attendance: 5,000; Referee: Alborz Hajipour
	Penalties
	(penalty scored) M. Umaña; (penalty scored) S. Makani; (penalty scored) M. Kafshgari; (penalty scored) M. Taremi		(penalty scored) R. Rezaeian; (penalty missed) B. Abdi; (penalty missed) A. Alipour

27 November 2014 Quarter Final	Gol Gohar	1 – 1 (a.e.t.) (2 – 3 p)	Persepolis	Sirjan
13:30 DST+03:30	M. Golzari (red card) 35'; M. Jomezadeh 100' (pen.)	Summary; Stats	H. Aliasgari (yellow card) 99'; M. Bengar 105+1' (yellow card) 105+2'; M. Taremi (yellow card) 126'	Stadium: Emam Ali Stadium; Attendance: 3,500; Referee: Mohammadreza Akbarian
	Penalties
	(penalty scored) H. Mozaffari; (penalty missed) H. Hatami; (penalty missed) M. Amiri; (penalty scored) M. Jomehzadeh; (penalty missed) S. Bahrekazemi		(penalty scored) M. Kafshgari; (penalty missed) S. Makani; (penalty scored) M. Hosseini; (penalty missed) M. Taremi; (penalty scored) M. Nouri

5 December 2014 Semi Final	Persepolis	1 – 2	Zob Ahan	Tehran
15:15 DST+03:30	M. Nouri 61'; M. Umaña (yellow card) 63' (yellow-red card) 72'	Summary; Stats	Gh. Dehnavi (yellow card) 31'; M. Tabrizi 69'; C. Santos 90+1'	Stadium: Azadi Stadium; Attendance: 40,000; Referee: Hossein Zargar

=== AFC Champions League ===
==== Group stage ====
Pos	Team	Pld	W	D	L	GF	GA	GD	Pts	Qualification	LEK	PER	NSR	BYD
1	(Qatar) Lekhwiya	6	4	1	1	9	5	+4	13	Advance to knockout stage	—	3–0	1–1	1–0
2	(Iran) Persepolis	6	4	0	2	7	7	0	12	Advance to knockout stage	3–0	—	1–0	2–1
3	(Saudi Arabia) Al-Nassr	6	2	2	2	7	6	+1	8		1–3	3–0	—	1–1
4	(Uzbekistan) Bunyodkor	6	0	1	5	2	7	−5	1		0–1	0–1	0–1	—

Source: AFC
Rules for classification: Group stage tiebreakers

Win Draw Loss Postponed

Date Round	Home	Score	Away	Location

24 February 2015 1	Persepolis (Iran)	3 – 0	(Qatar) Lekhwiya	Tehran, Iran
18:30 DST+03:30	M. Bengar 60'; H. Norouzi 66'; M. Nouri 83' (pen.)	Stats; Summary	M. Tresor (yellow card) 75'; Luiz J. (yellow card) 84'	Stadium: Azadi Stadium; Attendance: 15,350; Referee: (Sri Lanka) Hettikamkanamge Perera; Man of the Match: Hadi Norouzi

3 March 2015 2	Bunyodkor (Uzbekistan)	0 – 1	(Iran) Persepolis	Tashkent, Uzbekistan
16:30 DST+03:30	A. Komilov (yellow card) 31'	Stats; Summary	M. Nouri 20' (pen.) (yellow card) 45+2'; M. Bengar (yellow card) 58'	Stadium: Bunyodkor Stadium; Attendance: 21,285; Referee: (South Korea) Kim Dong-Jin; Man of the Match: Sosha Makani

17 March 2015 3	Al Nassr (Saudi Arabia)	3 – 0	(Iran) Persepolis	Riyadh, Saudi Arabia
21:00 DST+03:30	A. Mierzejewski 32'; M. Al-Sahlawi (yellow card) 76'; F. Estoyanoff 86' (yellow card) 90+4'; H. Al-Raheb 90+5'	Stats; Summary	A. Nourmohammadi (yellow card) 38'; M. Bengar (yellow card) 69'; M. Taremi (yellow card) 79'; M. Nouri (yellow card) 88'	Stadium: King Fahd Stadium; Attendance: 20,315; Referee: (Japan) Ryuji Sato; Man of the Match: (Poland) Adrian Mierzejewski

8 April 2015 4	Persepolis (Iran)	1 – 0	(Saudi Arabia) Al Nassr	Tehran, Iran
18:00 DST+03:30	M. Khanzadeh (yellow card) 45+3'; M. Taremi 62' (pen.); P. Sadeghian (yellow card) 69'; O. Alishah (yellow card) 69'; S. Makani (yellow card) 90+5'	Stats; Summary	O. Othman (yellow card) 5'; M. Husain (yellow card) 60'; A. Al-Jebreen (yellow card) 90+6'	Stadium: Azadi Stadium; Attendance: 100,000; Referee: (China) Ma Ning; Man of the Match: Mehdi Taremi
Note: Hossein Abdi coached Persepolis temporary. Payam Sadeghian booked on bench.

22 April 2015 5	Lekhwiya (Qatar)	3 – 0	(Iran) Persepolis	Doha, Qatar
21:00 DST+03:30	M. Abdullah (yellow card) 41'; Y. Msakni 69'; Nam Tae-Hee 83'; A. Afif 90+3'	Stats	M. Kafshgari (yellow card) 31'; M. Umaña (yellow card) 45'	Stadium: Lekhwiya Sports Stadium; Attendance: 4,877; Referee: (Australia) Benjamin Williams; Man of the Match: (South Korea) Nam Tae-Hee

6 May 2015 6	Persepolis (Iran)	2 – 1	(Uzbekistan) Bunyodkor	Tehran, Iran
20:35 DST+03:30	M. Nouri 49'; O. Jurabaev 73' (o.g.)	Stats	A. Filiposyan (yellow card) 34'; S. Rashidov 61'; T. Ayupov (yellow card) 66'; Ch. Zouagi (yellow card) 90'	Stadium: Azadi Stadium; Attendance: 100,000; Referee: (Japan) Yudai Yamamoto; Man of the Match: Mohammad Nouri

==== Knock-out stage ====
===== Round of 16 =====
19 May 2015 First leg	Persepolis (Iran)	1 – 0	(Saudi Arabia) Al Hilal	Tehran, Iran
19:30 UTC+4:30	O. Alishah (yellow card) 65'; S. Makani (yellow card) 81'; Digão 90+2' (o.g.)	Report	S. Al-Faraj (red card) 34'; N. Al-Abed (yellow card) 70'	Stadium: Azadi Stadium; Attendance: 100,000; Referee: (Malaysia) Nagor Amir Noor Mohamed; Man of the Match: Mehdi Taremi

26 May 2015 Second leg	Al Hilal (Saudi Arabia)	3 – 0	(Iran) Persepolis	Riyadh, Saudi Arabia
22:35 UTC+4:30	Y. Al-Salem 29'; M. Al-Shalhoub 57' (pen.); A. Al-Dawsari 90+1'	Stats	H. Norouzi (yellow card) 60'; M. Taremi (red card) 70'; A. ALipour (yellow card) 90'	Stadium: King Fahd International Stadium; Attendance: 23,590; Referee: (Uzbekistan) Valentin Kovalenko; Man of the Match: (Saudi Arabia) Yousef Al-Salem

=== Friendly Matches ===
==== Pre-season ====
Win Draw Loss Postponed

Date Round	Home	Score	Away	Location

18 June 2014	Ardabil AU	0 – 3	Persepolis	Ardabil
18:10 DST+03:30			38'; O. Alishah 43'; M. Daghagheleh 55'	Stadium: Takhti Stadium; Attendance: 1,000

21 June 2014	Sedaghat Astara	1 – 2	Persepolis	Astara
17:00 DST+03:30	H. Mousavi 71'		M. Taremi 23'; M. Bengar 36'; M. Daghagheleh (yellow card) 57'; M. Nouri (penalty missed) 74'	Stadium: Vahdat Stadium; Attendance: 5,000; Referee: Sekhavat Soleymannejad

24 June 2014	Motahed Ardabil	0 – 1	Persepolis	Ardabil
18:00 DST+03:30			O. Alishah 85'	Stadium: Takhti Stadium; Attendance: 2,000

1 July 2014	Persepolis	2 – 1	Padideh	Tehran
18:00 DST+03:30	S. Yazdani 21'; A. Fatemi 28'		Y. Shakeri 32'	Stadium: Derafshifar Stadium; Attendance: N/A

6 July 2014	Persepolis	0 – 0	Gostaresh Foulad	Tehran
18:00 DST+03:30				Stadium: Derafshifar Stadium; Attendance: N/A

14 July 2014	Persepolis	3 – 0	(Romania) Gloria Buzău	Istanbul
11:00 DST+02:00	R. Norouzi 19', 40'; M. Abbaszadeh 88'			Stadium: The Green Park Fitness Center

17 July 2014	Persepolis	3 – 2	(Azerbaijan) Sumgayit	Istanbul
11:00 DST+02:00	M. Abbaszadeh 49', 83'; M. Taremi 72'		T. Mikayilov 19'; M. Kurbanov 85' (pen.)	Stadium: The Green Park Fitness Center

18 July 2014	Persepolis	4 – 1	(Georgia (country)) Dinamo Batumi	Istanbul
11:00 DST+02:00	R. Norouzi (pen.) 80'; M. Abbaszadeh 75'		Goal	Stadium: The Green Park Fitness Center

==== During season ====
Win Draw Loss Postponed

Date Round	Home	Score	Away	Location

2 August 2014	Persepolis	8 – 1	Tehran Mobadel	Tehran
11:00 DST+03:30	M. Nouri; A. Esmaeilzadeh; M. Kamandani; M. Taremi			Stadium: Derafshifar Stadium; Attendance: 30

8 August 2014	Persepolis	4 – 1	Paykan	Tehran
18:00 DST+03:30	H. Norouzi; A. Astani; M. Taremi		J. Asgari	Stadium: Derafshifar Stadium; Attendance: 10

16 August 2014	Persepolis	1 – 2	Khooneh Be Khooneh	Tehran
10:30 DST+03:30	M. Hosseini 53'		M. Najafi 58', 72'	Stadium: Derafshifar Stadium

14 January 2015	Persepolis	3 – 1	(Uzbekistan) Bunyodkor	Dubai
	R. Khaleghifar 35', 72'; M. Bengar 64'; A. Nourmohammadi (red card) 75'		90+2'	Attendance: 50

17 January 2015	Ras AlKhaima (United Arab Emirates)	0 – 5	Persepolis	Ras al-Khaimah
			M. Abbaszadeh 30'; P. Sadeghian 35'; Tadeu 51', 69'; M. Taremi 60'	Stadium: Ras al-Khaima Stadium; Attendance: 120

21 January 2015	Persepolis	2 – 0	Shahrdari Tabriz	Tehran
15:00 DST+03:30	P. Sadeghian 43' (pen.); Tadeu 74' (pen.)			Stadium: Derafshifar Stadium; Attendance: 150

14 February 2015	Persepolis	2 – 1	Razkan Karaj	Tehran
15:30 DST+03:30	M. Abbaszadeh 35', 87'		65'	Stadium: Derafshifar Stadium; Referee: Majid Karami

== Statistics ==
=== Appearances and goals ===
				Pro League					Hazfi Cup					ACL					Total				
No	P	N	Name	S	P	M		A	S	P	M		A	S	P	M		A	S	P	M		A
1	GK	(Iran)	**Sosha Makani**	20	20	1918			4	4	446			8	8	769			32	32	3133	-36	
2	LM	(Iran)	**Omid Alishah**	23	26	2160	4	3	3	3	351	1	1	8	8	751			34	37	3262	5	4
3	CB	(Iran)	**Mohammadreza Khanzadeh**	13	16	1221			3	3	309		1	3	3	256			19	22	1786		1
4	CB	(Costa Rica)	**Michael Umaña**	24	24	2302			3	3	268			8	8	751			35	35	3321		
5	RB	(Iran)	**Mehdi Jafarpour**	4	4	297		1	1	2	92								5	5	389		1
6	CB	(Iran)	**Mohsen Bengar**	22	23	2077	2	1	3	3	351	1		3	4	288	1		28	30	2716	4	1
8	RW	(Iran)	**Mehdi Daghagheleh**	2	6	162				2	20								2	8	182		
9	DM	(Iran)	Reza Haghighi	11	14	1007			2	2	165								13	16	1173		
10	CF	(Iran)	**Reza Norouzi**	4	4	354	1												4	4	354	1	
11	SS	(Iran)	**Payam Sadeghian**	5	10	591	1		1	2	149	1			2	30			6	14	770	2	
12	LB	(Iran)	Meysam Hosseini	9	14	1037			3	3	351								12	17	1388		
13	RB	(Iran)	Hossein Mahini	7	7	678		1											7	7	678		1
14	AM	(Iran)	**Mohammad Nouri**	21	25	2098	5	1	4	4	446	2		7	7	669	3		32	36	3213	10	1
15	AM	(Iran)	**Afshin Esmaeilzadeh**	1	6	184													1	6	184		
16	SS	(Iran)	**Reza Khaleghifar**	7	10	705		1	1	1	95			1	3	114			9	14	914		1
17	CF	(Iran)	**Mehdi Taremi**	20	25	1930	7	5	3	4	323		1	8	8	699	1	1	31	37	2952	8	7
18	DM	(Iran)	**Mehrdad Kafshgari**	18	22	1570			2	3	280			4	5	394			24	30	2244		
19	AM	(Iran)	**Milad Kamandani**	1	3	98									1	17			1	4	115		
20	CB	(Iran)	**Alireza Nourmohammadi**	21	22	1994		1	3	4	375			8	8	769			32	34	3138		1
21	CM	(Iran)	**Ali Astani**																				
22	CF	(Brazil)	**Tadeu**	3	5	249													3	5	249		
23	LW	(Iran)	**Shahab Zahedi**		3	85				2	18									5	103		
24	SS	(Iran)	**Hadi Norouzi**	18	20	1626	2	6	4	4	403		2	7	8	699	1		29	32	2728	3	8
25	RB	(Iran)	Farshad Ghasemi							1	3									1	3		
26	RM	(Iran)	**Hamidreza Aliasgari**	14	18	1457		1	1	2	157			5	6	519			20	26	2038		1
27	LW	(Iran)	Ali Fatemi		2	18														2	18		
28	DM	(Iran)	**Ahmad Nourollahi**	17	20	1593	1	1	2	2	229			8	8	732			26	30	2554	1	1
29	LB	(Iran)	**Navid Sabouri**																				
30	LB	(Iran)	**Mobin Mir Doraghi**																				
33	CF	(Iran)	**Mohammad Abbaszadeh**	11	18	1168	5		1	1	52'	1							12	19	1221	6	
34	CM	(Iran)	**Mohammad Rahmati**																				
35	CF	(Iran)	**Amir Mohammad Madani**																				
40	GK	(Brazil)	Nilson Corrêa	9	9	870													8	8	870	-11	
41	GK	(Iran)	**Morteza Ghadimipour**																				
44	GK	(Iran)	**Masoud Homami**	1	1	95													1	1	95	-2	
66	AM	(Brazil)	**Gabriel**	9	9	727		1						4	4	353		1	13	13	1080		2
77	CF	(Iran)	**Ali Alipour**	3	11	403	2							1	8	171			4	19	574	2	
99	RB	(Iran)	**Babak Hatami**	11	11	1012								5	6	478			15	17	1490		
	GK	(Iran)	Nader Safarzaei																				
Totals							31	23				6	5				6	2				42	30
Last updated: 26 May 2015

=== Goalkeeping ===
			League			Hazfi Cup			Asian			Total		
No	N	Name	M	GA	CS	M	GA	CS	M	GA	CS	M	GA	CS
1	(Iran)	Sosha Makani	20	22	6	4	4	1	8	10	4	**32**	**36**	**11**
40	(Brazil)	Nilson	9	11	1	–	–	–	–	–	–	**9**	**11**	**1**
31	(Iran)	Masoud Homami	1	2	0	–	–	–	–	–	–	**1**	**2**	**0**
Total			30	35	7	4	4	1	8	10	4	42	49	12

=== Disciplinary record ===
==== Bookings & sendings-off ====
				Pro League			Hazfi Cup			ACL			Total		
No	P	N	Name	Yellow card	Double yellow card	Red card	Yellow card	Double yellow card	Red card	Yellow card	Double yellow card	Red card	Yellow card	Double yellow card	Red card
1	GK	(Iran)	**Sosha Makani**	2						2			4		
2	LM	(Iran)	**Omid Alishah**	3	1					2			5	**1**	
3	CB	(Iran)	**Mohammadreza Khanzadeh**	4						1			5		
4	CB	(Costa Rica)	**Michael Umaña**	3				1		1			4	**1**	
5	RB	(Iran)	**Mehdi Jafarpour**	1									1		
6	CB	(Iran)	**Mohsen Bengar**	8			2			2			12		
8	RW	(Iran)	**Mehdi Daghagheleh**												
9	DM	(Iran)	Reza Haghighi	3									3		
10	CF	(Iran)	**Reza Norouzi**												
11	SS	(Iran)	**Payam Sadeghian**	2		1				1			3		**1**
12	LB	(Iran)	Meysam Hosseini												
13	RB	(Iran)	Hossein Mahini	2									2		
14	MF	(Iran)	**Mohammad Nouri**	7			1			2			10		
15	AM	(Iran)	**Afshin Esmaeilzadeh**	1									1		
16	SS	(Iran)	**Reza Khaleghifar**												
17	CF	(Iran)	**Mehdi Taremi**	4			1			1	1		6	**1**	
18	DM	(Iran)	**Mehrdad Kafshgari**	2	1					1			3	**1**	
19	AM	(Iran)	**Milad Kamandani**												
20	CB	(Iran)	**Alireza Nourmohammadi**	7						1			8		
21	CM	(Iran)	Ali Astani												
22	CF	(Brazil)	**Tadeu**												
23	LW	(Iran)	**Shahab Zahedi**												
24	SS	(Iran)	**Hadi Norouzi**	1	1		1			1			3	**1**	
25	RB	(Iran)	Farshad Ghasemi												
26	RM	(Iran)	**Hamidreza Aliasgari**	5			1						6		
27	LW	(Iran)	Ali Fatemi												
28	DM	(Iran)	**Ahmad Nourollahi**	1									1		
29	LB	(Iran)	**Navid Sabouri**												
30	LB	(Iran)	**Mobin Mir Doraghi**												
33	CF	(Iran)	**Mohammad Abbaszadeh**												
34	CM	(Iran)	**Mohammad Rahmati**												
35	CF	(Iran)	**Amir Mohammad Madani**												
40	GK	(Brazil)	Nilson Corrêa	2									2		
41	GK	(Iran)	**Morteza Ghadimipour**												
44	GK	(Iran)	**Masoud Homami**												
66	AM	(Brazil)	**Gabriel**	1									1		
77	CF	(Iran)	**Ali Alipour**	3						1			4		
99	RB	(Iran)	**Babak Hatami**	3									3		
	GK	(Iran)	Nader Safarzaei												
Totals				64	3	1	6	1	0	16	1	0	86	5	1
Last updated: 26 May 2015

==== Suspensions ====
No.	Pos	Nat	Player	No. of matches served	Reason	Competition	Date served	Opponent(s)	Ref.
13	RB	(Iran)	Hossein Mahini^{1}	6	Conscription problems	All competitions	1 August 2014	Naft Tehran	
13	RB	(Iran)	Hossein Mahini^{1}	6	Conscription problems	All competitions	7 August 2014	Foolad	
13	RB	(Iran)	Hossein Mahini^{1}	6	Conscription problems	All competitions	25 September 2014	Esteghlal Khuzestan	
13	RB	(Iran)	Hossein Mahini^{1}	6	Conscription problems	All competitions	3 October 2014	Sepahan	
13	RB	(Iran)	Hossein Mahini^{1}	6	Conscription problems	All competitions	16 October 2014	Kargar Boneh Gaz	
13	RB	(Iran)	Hossein Mahini^{1}	6	Conscription problems	All competitions	21 October 2014	Saipa	
18	DM	(Iran)	Mehrdad Kafshgari	1	Double yellow card in match against Naft Tehran	League	7 August 2014	Foolad	
11	AM	(Iran)	Payam Sadeghian	1	Straight red card in match against Foolad	League	15 August 2014	Zob Ahan	
11	AM	(Iran)	Payam Sadeghian	11 (2 Month since August 7)^{2}	Unsporting behavior	All competitions	20 August 2014	Malavan	
11	AM	(Iran)	Payam Sadeghian	11 (2 Month since August 7)^{2}	Unsporting behavior	All competitions	25 August 2014	Padideh	
11	AM	(Iran)	Payam Sadeghian	11 (2 Month since August 7)^{2}	Unsporting behavior	All competitions	30 August 2014	Saba Qom	
11	AM	(Iran)	Payam Sadeghian	11 (2 Month since August 7)^{2}	Unsporting behavior	All competitions	5 September 2014	Tractor Sazi	
11	AM	(Iran)	Payam Sadeghian	11 (2 Month since August 7)^{2}	Unsporting behavior	All competitions	10 September 2014	Naft Masjed Soleyman	
11	AM	(Iran)	Payam Sadeghian	11 (2 Month since August 7)^{2}	Unsporting behavior	All competitions	17 September 2014	Rah Ahan	
11	AM	(Iran)	Payam Sadeghian	11 (2 Month since August 7)^{2}	Unsporting behavior	All competitions	24 September 2014	Esteghlal Khuzestan	
11	AM	(Iran)	Payam Sadeghian	11 (2 Month since August 7)^{2}	Unsporting behavior	All competitions	2 October 2014	Sepahan	
20	CB	(Iran)	Alireza Nourmohammadi	1	3rd yellow card	League	30 August 2014	Saba Qom	
6	CB	(Iran)	Mohsen Bengar	1	3rd yellow card	League	18 September 2014	Rah Ahan	
9	DM	(Iran)	Reza Haghighi	1	3rd yellow card	League	21 October 2014	Saipa	
6	CB	(Iran)	Mohsen Bengar	1	5th yellow card	League	1 December 2014	Naft Tehran	
2	LW	(Iran)	Omid Alishah	1	Double yellow card in a match against Esteghlal	League	1 December 2014	Naft Tehran	
14	AM	(Iran)	Mohammad Nouri	1	3rd yellow card	League	1 December 2014	Naft Tehran	
6	CB	(Iran)	Mohsen Bengar	1	2nd yellow card	Cup	5 December 2014	Zob Ahan	
2	RW	(Iran)	Omid Alishah	2	Unsporting behavior	Cup	5 December 2014	Zob Ahan	
2	RW	(Iran)	Omid Alishah	2	Unsporting behavior	League	11 December 2014	Foolad	
3	CB	(Iran)	Mohammadreza Khanzadeh	1	3rd yellow card	League	11 December 2014	Foolad	
4	CB	(Costa Rica)	Michael Umaña^{3}	1	Double yellow card in a match against Zob Ahan	League	11 December 2014	Foolad	
14	AM	(Iran)	Mohammad Nouri	1	5th yellow card	League	30 January 2015	Malavan	
17	CF	(Iran)	Mehdi Taremi	1	3rd yellow card	League	30 January 2015	Malavan	
26	RM	(Iran)	Hamidreza Aliasgari	1	3rd yellow card	League	6 February 2015	Padideh	
6	CB	(Iran)	Mohsen Bengar	1	7th yellow card	League	13 February 2015	Saba Qom	
20	CB	(Iran)	Alireza Nourmohammadi	1	5th yellow card	League	19 February 2015	Tractor Sazi	
4	CB	(Costa Rica)	Michael Umaña	1	3rd yellow card	League	8 March 2015	Naft Masjed Soleyman	
14	AM	(Iran)	Mohammad Nouri	1	7th yellow card	League	8 March 2015	Naft Masjed Soleyman	
6	CB	(Iran)	Mohsen Bengar	1	2nd yellow card	CL	17 March 2015	Al-Nassr	
14	AM	(Iran)	Mohammad Nouri	1	2nd yellow card	CL	17 March 2015	Al-Nassr	
99	RB	(Iran)	Babak Hatami	1	5th yellow card	League	3 April 2015	Esteghlal Khuzestan	
2	LW	(Iran)	Omid Alishah	1	3rd yellow card	League	12 April 2015	Sepahan	
24	SS	(Iran)	Hadi Norouzi	1	Double yellow card in a match against Sepahan	League	16 April 2015	Saipa	
77	CF	(Iran)	Ali Alipour	1	3rd yellow card	League	16 April 2015	Saipa	
3	CB	(Iran)	Mohammadreza Khanzadeh	6 (9 months, since April 28)	Unsporting behavior	League	1 May 2015	Paykan	
3	CB	(Iran)	Mohammadreza Khanzadeh	6 (9 months, since April 28)	Unsporting behavior	CL	6 May 2015	Bunyodkor	
3	CB	(Iran)	Mohammadreza Khanzadeh	6 (9 months, since April 28)	Unsporting behavior	League	11 May 2015	Gostaresh Foulad	
3	CB	(Iran)	Mohammadreza Khanzadeh	6 (9 months, since April 28)	Unsporting behavior	League	15 May 2015	Esteghlal	
3	CB	(Iran)	Mohammadreza Khanzadeh	6 (9 months, since April 28)	Unsporting behavior	CL	19 May 2015	Al Hilal	
3	CB	(Iran)	Mohammadreza Khanzadeh	6 (9 months, since April 28)	Unsporting behavior	CL	26 May 2015	Al Hilal	
20	CB	(Iran)	Alireza Nourmohammadi	1	7th yellow card	League	11 May 2015	Gostaresh Foulad	
Last updated: 6 May 2015

^{1} Hossein Mahini signed contract with Malavan late in October, his suspension counted until his official move to Malavan.
^{2} FFIRI disciplinary committee suspend him for 3 months but FFIRI appeals committee reduce one month of his suspension.
^{3} After Persepolis elimination in Hazfi Cup Michael Umaña's suspension (due sent off in match against Zob Ahan) applied in League.

=== Injuries During The Season ===
Players in bold are still out from their injuries.

No.	Pos	Nat	Name	Date	Injury	Estimated Return Date	Match(es) lost	Source
8	RW	(Iran)	Mehdi Daghagheleh	5 July 2014	Quadriceps rupture	August 2014	From fixture 1 to 14 (L)	
26	RM	(Iran)	Hamidreza Aliasgari	12 August 2014	Hamstring elongation	August 2014	From fixture 3 to 6 (L) From fixture 7 to 14 (L)	
24	SS	(Iran)	Hadi Norouzi	14 August 2014	Groin elongation	August 2014	From fixture 3 to 8(L)	
23	GK	(Iran)	Nader Safarzaei ^{R}	15 August 2014	ACL rupture	March 2015	From fixture 3 (L)	
18	DM	(Iran)	Mehrdad Kafshgari	20 August 2014	Knee strains	August 2014	Fixture 4 ^{DM} (L)	
18	DM	(Iran)	Mehrdad Kafshgari	30 August 2014	Hamstring elongation	September 2014	From fixture 6 ^{DM} to 7 (L)	
10	CF	(Iran)	Reza Norouzi	20 August 2014	ACL rupture	March 2015	From fixture 5 (L); All Hazfi Cup matches From round 1 to 4 (CL)	
29	LB	(Iran)	Navid Sabouri	24 August 2014	Quadriceps rupture	September 2014	From fixture 6 to 10(L)	
33	CF	(Iran)	Mohammad Abbaszadeh	4 November 2014	Hamstring elongation	December 2014	Fixture 14 (L) Quarter final (C)	
11	AM	(Iran)	Payam Sadeghian	21 November 2014	Groin elongation	February 2015	From fixture 15 to 20 (L) Quarter and semi final (C)	
9	DM	(Iran)	Reza Haghighi	23 November 2014	Inferior gemellus muscle rupture	December 2014	From fixture 15 ^{DM}to 17(L) Quarter and semi final (C)	
17	CF	(Iran)	Mehdi Taremi	5 December 2014	Hamstring elongation	December 2014	Fixture 17 (L) semi final ^{DM} (C)	
40	GK	(Brazil)	Nilson	7 December 2014	Metacarpus	December 2014	Fixture 17 (L)	
18	DM	(Iran)	Mehrdad Kafshgari	9 December 2014	Abdomen elongation	December 2014	Fixture 17 (L)	
20	CB	(Iran)	Alireza Nourmohammadi	25 January 2015	Abdomen elongation	February 2015	From fixture 18 to 19(L)	
3	CB	(Iran)	Mohammadreza Khanzadeh	6 February 2015	Right foot strains	February 2015	From fixture 19 to 21 ^{DM}(L); Round 1 (CL)	
33	CF	(Iran)	Mohammad Abbaszadeh	26 February 2015	Flu	March 2015	Round 2 (CL)	
26	RM	(Iran)	Hamidreza Aliasgari	28 February 2015	Wrist strains	March 2015	Round 2 (CL)	
17	CF	(Iran)	Mehdi Taremi	3 March 2015	Hamstring elongation	March 2015	Round 2 ^{DM}(CL); Fixture 22 (L)	
24	SS	(Iran)	Hadi Norouzi	5 March 2015	MCL elongation	March 2015	Fixture 22 (L)	
66	AM	(Brazil)	Fernando Gabriel	12 March 2015	Frontal fracture	April 2015	From fixture 22^{DM} to 24 (L); From round 3 (CL)	
99	RB	(Iran)	Babak Hatami	14 March 2015		March 2015	Round 3 (CL)	
24	RW	(Iran)	Hadi Norouzi	28 March 2015		April 2015	Fixture 24 (L)	
6	CB	(Iran)	Mohsen Bengar	3 March 2015		April 2015	From fixture 25 ^{DM} to 29 (L) from Round 4 to 6, Round of 16 (A) (CL)	
18	DM	(Iran)	Mehrdad Kafshgari	14 May 2015		May 2015	Fixture 30 (L); Round of 16 (H & A) (CL)	
66	AM	(Brazil)	Fernando Gabriel	10 May 2015		May 2015	Fixture 30 (L); Round of 16 (H & A) (CL)	
Last updated: 26 May 2015

Notes

- ^{DM} Substituted during match.
- ^{R} Player released by The Club during his injury time.

=== Captaincy ===
No.	Pos	Nat	Name	Pro League	Hazfi Cup	ACL	Total	Notes
20	CB	(Iran)	Alireza Nourmohammadi	5	0	0	5	3rd captain
14	AM	(Iran)	Mohammad Nouri	21	4	7	32	Captain
24	SS	(Iran)	Hadi Norouzi	3	0	1	4	Vice Captain
6	CB	(Iran)	Mohsen Bengar	1	0	0	1	
Last updated: 26 May 2015

=== Overall statistics ===
	Pro League		Hazfi Cup		ACL		Total		
	Home	Away	Home	Away	Home	Away	Home	Away	Total
Games played	15	15	3	1	4	4	22	20	42
Games won	4	5	1	0	4	1	9	6	15
Games drawn	6	3	1	1	0	0	7	4	11
Games lost	5	7	1	0	0	6	6	10	16
Goals scored	15	16	5	1	7	1	27	18	45
Goals conceded	17	18	3	1	1	9	21	28	49
Goal difference	-2	-2	+2	0	+5	-8	+6	-10	-4
Clean sheets	4	3	1	0	3	1	8	4	12
Goal by Substitute	1	3	1	0	0	0	2	3	5
Biggest Win	1–0 (against Zob Ahan)	2–0 (against Saba)	3–0 (against Kargar Boneh Gaz)	—	3–0 (against Lekhwiya)	1–0 (against Bunyodkor)	3–0 (against Kargar Boneh Gaz) (against Lekhwiya)	2–0 (against Saba)	3–0 (against Kargar Boneh Gaz) (against Lekhwiya)
Biggest Loss	3–1 (against Tractor Sazi)	2–0 (against Foolad)	2–1 (against Zob Ahan)	—	—	3–0 (against Al-Nassr, Lekhwiya & Al-Hilal)	3–1 (against Tractor Sazi)	2–0 (against Foolad)	3–0 (against Al-Nassr, Lekhwiya & Al-Hilal)
Players used	30	30	21	14	17	17	31	30	32
Average Goals for per game	1	1.07	1.67	1	1.75	0.25	1.23	0.90	1.07
Average Goals against per game	1.13	1.20	1	1	0.25	2.5	0.95	1.4	1.17
Winning Rate	26.67%	33.33%	33.33%	0	100%	25%	40.91%	30%	35.71%
Most appearances	Mehdi Taremi (14)	Omid Alishah (13)	6 Players (3)	14 Players (1)	9 Players (4)	9 Players (4)	Mehdi Taremi (21)	Omid Alishah (18)	Omid Alishah; Mehdi Taremi (37)
Most minutes played	Michael Umaña (1150')	Michael Umaña (1152')	3 Players (312')	8 Players (134')	3 Players (386')	5 Players (383')	Michael Umaña (1715')	Omid Alishah (1612')	Michael Umaña (3321')
Top scorer	Mehdi Taremi (4)	Omid Alishah (4)	Mohammad Nouri (2)	Mohsen Bengar (1)	Mohammad Nouri (2)	Mohammad Nouri (1)	Mohammad Nouri (6)	Mohammad Nouri; Omid Alishah (4)	Mohammad Nouri (10)
Top assister	Hadi Norouzi (4)	Mehdi Taremi (4)	Hadi Norouzi (2)	Omid Alishah (1)	Mehdi Taremi; Gabriel (1)	—	Hadi Norouzi (6)	Mehdi Taremi (4)	Hadi Norouzi (8)
Last updated: 26 May 2015

== Club ==
=== Kit ===
Supplier: (Italy) Macron

Home Kit	Away Kit

Source: "Persepolis FC' current kit". Archived from the original on 2010-01-29.

=== Sponsorship ===
- Main sponsor: Behnam Pishro Kish
- Official sponsor: Iran Zamin Bank Archived 2015-07-23 at the Wayback Machine
- Official shirt manufacturer: Macron
- Official sponsor: EJS International Investment Co.
- Official water: Damavand Mineral Water Co.

== See also ==
- 2014–15 Iran Pro League
- 2014–15 Hazfi Cup
- 2015 AFC Champions League
