= Shahab Dehghanian =

Iranian association footballer

Personal information
- Full name: Shahabuddin Dehghanian
- Date of birth: 30 November 2001 (age 24)
- Place of birth: Ahvaz, Iran
- Height: 1.80 m (5 ft 11 in)
- Position: Defensive midfielder

Team information
- Current team: Persepolis
- Number: 46

Youth career
- 2019–2020: Esteghlal
- 2020–2022: Paykan
- 2022–: Persepolis

Senior career*
Years	Team	Apps	(Gls)
2022–	Persepolis	0	(0)

International career
2019–	Iran U20	0	(0)
- * Club domestic league appearances and goals

Shahab Dehghanian (Persian: شهاب دهقانیان; born 30 November 2001) is an Iranian professional footballer who plays as a defensive midfielder for Persian Gulf Pro League club Persepolis.

== Club career ==
=== Persepolis ===
On 19 September 2020 joined to Persepolis Club Academy.

In 2022, with the opinion of head coach Yahya Golmohammadi, Dehghanian was added to the training sessions of the Persepolis adult team

== Career statistics ==
Club	Division	Season	League		Hazfi Cup		Asia		Other		Total	
Club	Division	Season	Apps	Goals	Apps	Goals	Apps	Goals	Apps	Goals	Apps	Goals
Persepolis	Pro League	2022–23	0	0	0	0	0	0	0	0	0	0
Persepolis	Pro League	Career Totals	0	0	0	0	0	0	0	0	0	0
