= Esmail Halali =

Iranian footballer and manager

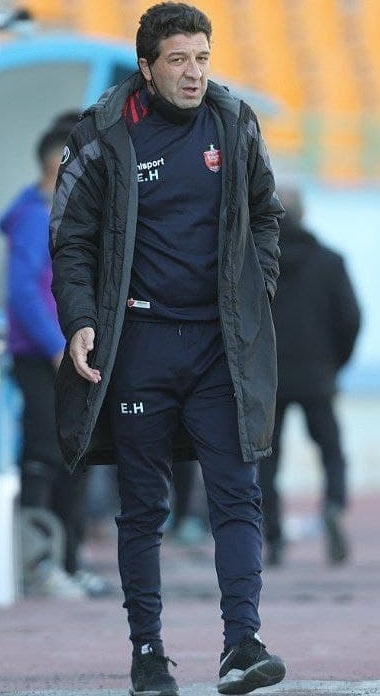
- Esmail Halali as manager of Persepolis at Derby Tehran (U23) in 2022

Personal information
- Full name: Esmail Halali
- Date of birth: August 13, 1973 (age 53)
- Place of birth: Tabriz, Iran
- Height: 1.86 m (6 ft 1 in)
- Position: Midfielder

Youth career
- 1989–1991: Tractor

Senior career*
Years	Team	Apps	(Gls)
1991–1992	Machine Sazi		
1992–1995	Tractor		
1995–2002	Persepolis		
2002–2003	Sanat Naft		
2003–2004	Paykan		
2004–2006	Esteghlal Ahvaz		
2006–2007	Shahrdari Bandar Abbas		
2007–2008	Shahin Bushehr		

International career
1997–2000	Iran	11	(0)

Managerial career
- 2009–2010: Persepolis B (assistant)
- 2010–2013: Persepolis B
- 2013–2015: Mes Soongoun
- * Club domestic league appearances and goals

Esmail Halali (Persian: اسماعيل حلالى, born on August 13, 1973, in Tabriz) is an Iranian football manager and former footballer who played as a midfielder. He most recently played for Shahin Bushehr in the Iran Azadegan League before retiring from professional football.

== Playing career ==
=== Club career ===
He began his professional career with Tractor in 1989 and was promoted to the first-team squad in 1992. After the relegation of Tractor in 1995, he left the team and joins to Persepolis. He played for Perseopolis seven season but was sell to Sanat Naft at the end of the 2001–02 season. He also played at the Paykan, Esteghlal Ahvaz, Shahrdari Bandar Abbas (in Azadegan League) and Shahin Bushehr in the next years. He announced his retirement in July 2008 to starting his coaching period.

=== International career ===
He was invited to the national team by Tomislav Ivić when he was played for Persepolis. He has 15 caps at the Iran national football team and also was part of the team in 2000 AFC Asian Cup.

== Coaching career ==
He was started his coaching career just months after his retirement at his beloved club, Persepolis as Hossein Abdi's assistant in B team. After Abdi resigned, he was named as the B team's head coach by chairman Habib Kashani on 1 July 2010. Under his management, Persepolis won the Tehran Provincial League and was promoted to the 3rd Division. They also won the Tehran Hazfi Cup at the same season and made a Double, the first B team to doing so.

=== Statistics ===
As of 3 March 2013

Nat	Team	From	To	Record							
Nat	Team	From	To	G	W	D	L	Win %	GF	GA	+/-
(Iran)	Persepolis B	July 2010	July 2013	84	50	19	15	59.52	151	79	+72
Total				84	50	19	15	59.52	151	79	+72

== Honours ==
=== As a player ===
Tractor

- Hazfi Cup: 1993–94 (Runner-up)

Persepolis

- Iranian league (5): 1995–96, 1996–97, 1998–99, 1999–2000, 2001–02
  - Runner-up: 2000–01
- Hazfi Cup (1): 1998–99

=== As a manager ===
Persepolis B

- Tehran provincial league (1): 2011–12
- Tehran Hazfi Cup (1): 2011–12
