= Tadeu (footballer, born 1986) =

Brazilian footballer

Personal information
- Full name: José Tadeu Mouro Júnior
- Date of birth: 1 April 1986 (age 40)
- Place of birth: Araraquara, Brazil
- Height: 1.89 m (6 ft 2 in)
- Position: Forward

Youth career
- 2003–2005: Cruzeiro
- 2006: São Paulo

Senior career*
Years	Team	Apps	(Gls)
2005	Cruzeiro	1	(0)
2006	São Paulo	2	(0)
2007	Juventude	15	(5)
2007–2009	Grêmio	0	(0)
2008	→ Figueirense (loan)	31	(7)
2009–2010	Bursaspor	13	(2)
2010	Grêmio Barueri	3	(1)
2010–2012	Palmeiras	13	(1)
2011	→ Sport Recife (loan)	1	(0)
2012	→ Oeste (loan)		
2012	→ Grêmio Barueri (loan)	11	(0)
2013	União Barbarense		
2013	Icasa	19	(11)
2014	Ceará	2	(1)
2014	Náutico	17	(4)
2015	Persepolis	5	(1)
2015	Boa Esporte	14	(2)
2016–2017	Penang FA	0	(0)
2017	Juventude	0	(0)
2017–2018	América (RN)	11	(5)
2018	Mestre		
2019	Rio Claro		
2020	Caldense		
2020	Pelotas		
2020	Água Santa		
2020–2021	Maringá		
2021	Taubaté		
2021	America (RJ)		
2021–2022	Joinville	6	(1)
2022	Paraná	0	(0)
2022	Avenida		
Total		164	(41)
- * Club domestic league appearances and goals

José Tadeu Mouro Júnior (born 1 April 1986), commonly known as Tadeu, is an Brazilian former professional footballer who plays as a forward.

== Career ==
Tadeu played for Cruzeiro Esporte Clube São Paulo, Juventude, Grêmio, Figueirense and Sport Recife.

=== Bursaspor ===
On 27 January 2009, Tadeu signed a three-year contract with Turkish club Bursaspor.

=== Persepolis ===
Tadeu signed a two-year contract with Iranian giant, Persepolis on 28 December 2014 after success in medical tests. He was transferred to the Red Army on 1 January 2015.

=== Later career ===
In September 2018, Tadeu moved to Italy and joined A.C. Mestre. However, his contract was terminated three months later. Tadeu then returned to Brazil and played for Rio Claro. In December 2019, Tadeu signed for Caldense. However, he was released already in the beginning of January 2020 because he didn't fit in the club's philosophy. A few days later, he then joined Esporte Clube Pelotas.

== Career statistics ==
As of 12 March 2015

Appearances and goals by club, season and competition
Club	Season	League			Cup (Note: Includes Copa do Brasil, Turkish Cup and Hazfi Cup)		Continental (Note: Includes Copa Libertadores, Copa Sudamericana, Recopa Sudamericana and AFC Champions League)		Other (Note: Includes Copa do Nordeste, Campeonato Mineiro, Campeonato Gaúcho, Campeonato Catarinense, Campeonato Cearense, Campeonato Paulista & Campeonato Pernambucano)		Total	
Club	Season	Division	Apps	Goals	Apps	Goals	Apps	Goals	Apps	Goals	Apps	Goals
Cruzeiro	2005	Série A	1	0	0	0	0	0	0	0	1	0
São Paulo	2006	Série A	2	0	–	–	0	0	0	0	2	0
Juventude	2007	Série A	15	5	–	–	–	–	0	0	15	5
Grêmio	2008	Série A	0	0	0	0	–	–	0	0	0	0
Figueirense	2008	Série A	31	7	–	–	–	–	–	–	31	7
Bursaspor	2008–09	Süper Lig	7	2	1	0	–	–	–	–	8	2
Bursaspor	2009–10	Süper Lig	6	0	1	1	–	–	–	–	7	1
Grêmio Barueri	2010	Série A	3	1	–	–	–	–	18	9	21	10
Palmeiras	2010	Série A	13	1	0	0	2	2	–	–	15	3
Sport Recife	2011	Série B	1	0	1	0	–	–	9	1	11	1
Oeste	2012	—	–	–	–	–	–	–	13	5	13	5
Grêmio Barueri	2012	Série B	11	0	–	–	–	–	–	–	11	0
União Barbarense	2013	—	–	–	–	–	–	–	6	0	6	0
Icasa	2013	Série B	19	11	–	–	–	–	–	–	19	11
Ceará	2014	Série B	2	1	1	0	–	–	19	6	22	7
Náutico	2014	Série B	17	4	–	–	–	–	–	–	17	4
Persepolis	2014–15	Pro League	5	1	0	0	0	0	–	–	5	1
Career total			133	32	4	1	2	2	65	21	204	56
