= 2016–17 Azadegan League =

26th season of Azadegan League

Azadegan League
- Season: 2016–17
- Champions: Pars Jonoubi Jam; 1st Azadegan League title
- Promoted: Pars Jonoubi Jam; Sepidrood
- Relegated: Kheybar Khorramabad; Foolad Yazd; Esteghlal Ahvaz
- Matches: 306
- Goals: 622 (2.03 per match)
- Top goalscorer: Mohammad Abbaszadeh (24 goals)
- Biggest home win: Khooneh be Khooneh 6–0 Rah Ahan (23 September 2016)
- Biggest away win: Est. Ahvaz 1–5 Mes Kerman (31 January 2017)
- Highest scoring: Mes Rafsanjan 6–1 Kheybar Khorramabad (7 December 2016)
- Longest winning run: 4 matches Malavan; Pars Jonoubi Jam
- Longest unbeaten run: 23 matches Pars Jonoubi Jam
- Longest winless run: 34 matches Esteghlal Ahvaz
- Longest losing run: 8 matches Esteghlal Ahvaz
- Highest attendance: 20,000; Sepidrood – Nassaji (1 May 2017)
- Lowest attendance: 0 (spectator ban); Est. Ahvaz – Aluminium Arak (13 August 2016); Est. Ahvaz – Foolad Yazd (26 August 2016); Foolad Yazd – Iranjavan (23 November 2016); Khooneh be Khooneh – Mes Kerman (23 November 2016); Khooneh be Khooneh – Malavan (7 December 2016); Foolad Yazd – Fajr Sepasi (7 December 2016); Khooneh be Khooneh – Mes Rafsanjan (13 January 2017); Foolad Yazd – Baadraan (13 January 2017); Sepidrood – Est. Ahvaz (21 February 2017); Naft MIS – Sepidrood (30 March 2017); Nassaji – Baadraan Tehran (30 March 2017); Khooneh be Khooneh – Gol Gohar (5 April 2017); Nassaji – Rah Ahan (24 April 2017); Khooneh be Khooneh – Kheybar (1 May 2017)
- Total attendance: 771,193
- Average attendance: 2,650

The 2016–17 Azadegan League was the 26th season of the Azadegan League and 16th as the second highest division since its establishment in 1991. The season featured 12 teams from the 2015–16 Azadegan League, three new teams relegated from the 2015–16 Persian Gulf Pro League: Malavan, Rah Ahan and Esteghlal Ahvaz and three new teams promoted from the 2015–16 League 2: Oxin Alborz and Sepidrood Rasht both as champions and Pars Jonoubi Jam. Baadraan Tehran replaced Parseh Tehran. The league started on 7 August 2016 and ended on 1 May 2017. Pars Jonoubi Jam won the Azadegan League title for the first time in their history. Pars Jonoubi Jam and Sepidrood Rasht promoted to the Persian Gulf Pro League. Mohammad Abbaszadeh, from Nassaji Mazandaran, was the top scorer with 24 goals.

== Teams ==
=== Stadia and locations ===
Locations of clubs

Team	Location	Venue	Capacity
Aluminium Arak	Arak	Imam Khomeini	15,000
Baadraan Tehran	Tehran	Kargaran	5,000
Est. Ahvaz	Ahvaz	Takhti Ahvaz	10,000
Fajr Sepasi	Shiraz	Hafezieh	15,000
Foolad Yazd	Yazd	Shahid Nassiri	6,000
Gol Gohar	Sirjan	Gol Gohar Sport Complex	3,200
Iranjavan	Bushehr	Shahid Beheshti	15,000
Kheybar Khorramabad	Khorramabad	Takhti Khorramabad	10,000
Khooneh be Khooneh	Babol	Haft-e Tir	6,000
Malavan	Bandar-e Anzali	Takhti Anzali	8,000
Mes Kerman	Kerman	Shahid Bahonar	15,430
Mes Rafsanjan	Rafsanjan	Shohadaye Noushabad	5,000
Naft Masjed Soleyman	Masjed Soleyman	Behnam Mohammadi	8,000
Nassaji Mazandaran	Qaem Shahr	Vatani	15,000
Pars Jonoubi Jam	Jam	Takhti Jam	10,000
Rah Ahan	Tehran	Shahid Derakhshan	8,000
Sepidrood	Rasht	Dr. Azodi	11,000
Oxin Alborz	Karaj	Enghelab	15,000

== League table ==
Pos	Team	Pld	W	D	L	GF	GA	GD	Pts	Promotion or relegation
1	Pars Jonoubi Jam (C, P)	34	16	14	4	29	14	+15	62	Promotion to 2017-18 Persian Gulf Pro League
2	Sepidrood (P)	34	17	10	7	35	24	+11	61	Promotion to 2017-18 Persian Gulf Pro League
3	Gol Gohar	34	16	12	6	49	34	+15	60	
4	Malavan	34	15	13	6	34	27	+7	58	
5	Khooneh be Khooneh	34	15	11	8	47	33	+14	56	
6	Baadraan Tehran	34	14	14	6	34	21	+13	56	
7	Oxin Alborz	34	13	10	11	39	29	+10	49	
8	Mes Kerman	34	11	16	7	35	25	+10	49	
9	Aluminium Arak	34	12	12	10	38	31	+7	48	
10	Nassaji Mazandaran	34	12	10	12	44	41	+3	46	
11	Mes Rafsanjan	34	11	10	13	42	32	+10	43	
12	Iranjavan	34	9	11	14	39	41	−2	38	
13	Naft Masjed Soleyman	34	7	16	11	33	32	+1	37	
14	Fajr Sepasi	34	8	12	14	32	38	−6	36	
15	Rah Ahan	34	8	12	14	31	49	−18	36	
16	Kheybar Khorramabad (R)	34	8	10	16	23	41	−18	34	Relegation to 2017–18 2nd Division
17	Foolad Yazd (R)	34	6	12	16	20	42	−22	30	Relegation to 2017–18 2nd Division
18	Est. Ahvaz (R)	34	0	11	23	18	68	−50	11	Relegation to 2017–18 2nd Division

Updated to match(es) played on 1 May 2017. Source:
Rules for classification: 1) points; 2) goal difference; 3) number of goals scored.
(C) Champions; (P) Promoted; (R) Relegated

== Results ==
Home \ Away	ALU	BAD	ESA	FJR	FOY	GOL	IRJ	KHE	KBK	MLV	MSR	NFT	NSJ	OXI	PJJ	RAH	MES	SEP
Aluminium Arak		1–0	1–1	2–3	0–1	1–1	3–0	1–0	2–0	2–3	0–2	1–2	1–1	1–0	0–0	2–1	0–0	1–0
Baadraan Tehran	1–1		3–1	1–0	2–1	1–1	0–0	1–0	3–0	1–1	1–1	0–0	0–1	1–1	0–0	0–0	1–1	1–0
Est. Ahvaz	0–3	0–1		1–1	1–1	0–2	0–0	0–1	0–0	1–3	1–2	2–2	1–1	0–0	1–2	1–1	1–5	0–1
Fajr Sepasi	1–1	0–0	4–0		2–0	0–2	3–2	0–1	2–0	0–0	0–1	1–3	0–0	0–0	0–0	2–2	0–2	1–2
Foolad Yazd	0–0	1–1	2–1	0–2		1–2	1–0	1–1	0–1	0–0	0–2	1–0	1–0	0–3	0–1	2–2	1–0	1–1
Gol Gohar	3–2	0–2	4–0	1–0	2–1		3–0	1–0	0–0	3–1	2–1	0–0	2–2	2–1	0–1	5–1	0–0	3–2
Iranjavan	3–3	1–2	5–0	2–1	2–1	1–1		0–1	0–0	3–2	0–0	0–0	2–2	0–1	1–2	5–0	1–1	3–1
Kheybar Khorramabad	1–3	0–2	2–0	0–0	0–0	1–1	1–0		0–0	0–1	1–1	1–0	2–1	1–2	0–1	0–2	0–0	1–1
Khooneh be Khooneh	1–1	2–2	1–0	1–1	2–1	5–1	1–2	4–2		2–0	3–1	3–0	3–0	0–2	0–2	6–0	0–0	0–1
Malavan	1–0	1–0	2–1	1–0	1–0	0–0	0–0	2–1	1–1		2–1	0–0	1–0	1–0	1–1	0–0	2–1	1–0
Mes Rafsanjan	0–1	1–2	3–0	2–3	5–0	3–0	1–0	6–1	1–2	0–0		1–1	0–1	2–1	0–0	4–2	0–0	0–0
Naft Masjed Soleyman	1–1	0–1	1–1	2–0	1–1	0–1	3–0	1–2	1–2	1–1	0–0		0–1	3–0	0–0	4–0	2–2	1–0
Nassaji Mazandaran	0–1	2–2	3–0	0–1	3–0	3–3	2–1	3–1	1–2	2–1	2–0	2–1		0–1	1–1	4–1	0–0	2–1
Oxin Alborz	0–1	1–0	3–0	3–1	1–1	0–0	1–2	2–0	1–1	2–1	1–1	1–1	3–1		0–0	0–1	2–0	1–2
Pars Jonoubi Jam	2–1	0–1	1–0	1–0	1–0	2–0	2–1	0–0	0–0	2–0	1–0	0–0	2–0	0–2		0–2	1–1	1–1
Rah Ahan	0–0	0–1	3–0	1–1	0–0	0–2	0–1	3–1	0–1	1–2	2–0	3–0	1–1	0–0	0–2		1–0	0–0
Mes Kerman	1–0	1–0	2–2	2–2	2–0	1–1	1–0	1–0	1–2	0–0	1–0	2–2	2–0	3–1	1–0	1–1		0–1
Sepidrood	1–0	1–0	2–1	2–0	0–0	1–0	1–1	0–0	3–1	1–1	1–0	1–0	3–2	2–1	0–0	1–0	1–0	

Updated to match(es) played on 1 May 2017. Source:
Legend: Blue = home team win; Yellow = draw; Red = away team win.

== Clubs season-progress ==
Team ╲ Round	1	2	3	4	5	6	7	8	9	10	11	12	13	14	15	16	17	18	19	20	21	22	23	24	25	26	27	28	29	30	31	32	33	34
Pars Jonoubi Jam	W	W	D	D	W	D	D	L	L	L	W	W	D	W	D	W	D	D	D	W	W	W	D	D	D	D	W	W	D	W	W	W	W	L
Sepidrood	W	W	D	L	W	D	W	W	W	D	D	W	W	W	L	W	W	L	W	D	D	W	D	L	W	D	D	W	L	W	W	D	L	W
Gol Gohar	W	W	D	D	D	W	W	W	L	L	W	D	D	L	W	L	W	W	D	D	W	D	D	D	W	D	W	W	W	L	L	D	W	W
Malavan	W	D	D	W	L	W	L	W	D	W	W	W	W	D	D	L	D	W	W	W	D	D	L	D	D	W	L	D	W	W	W	L	D	D
Khooneh be Khooneh	W	W	D	D	L	D	W	W	D	W	W	L	D	D	L	W	D	D	W	L	L	L	L	W	W	L	W	W	D	W	W	D	D	W
Baadraan Tehran	L	W	D	D	W	D	L	D	W	W	L	L	W	W	D	L	D	W	D	W	W	D	L	D	W	D	D	D	D	W	W	W	D	W
Mes Kerman	D	D	D	D	D	D	W	L	W	D	W	D	L	D	D	D	W	W	W	D	W	W	W	D	D	D	W	L	W	L	L	L	D	L
Oxin Alborz	W	L	W	W	W	L	W	W	D	L	D	W	L	L	L	L	L	W	D	D	W	D	W	D	D	W	L	L	D	D	L	D	W	W
Aluminium Arak	L	W	D	W	W	D	L	L	D	W	D	D	D	D	L	W	D	L	D	L	L	W	W	W	D	W	W	L	L	W	W	D	D	L
Nassaji Mazandaran	L	W	D	D	D	D	W	W	W	L	L	W	D	D	W	D	W	L	W	W	L	D	L	L	W	D	W	L	D	L	L	L	W	L
Mes Rafsanjan	L	L	L	L	D	W	L	L	L	W	D	W	W	D	D	W	W	D	L	W	W	D	W	D	L	D	L	W	D	L	L	L	D	W
Iranjavan	L	D	D	D	W	L	W	L	D	D	L	L	D	L	W	W	W	D	L	L	L	D	D	L	L	W	W	L	D	L	W	D	L	W
Naft Masjed Soleyman	W	L	W	D	D	D	D	D	L	L	D	L	D	L	W	D	D	D	L	W	L	D	D	D	L	L	L	W	W	L	W	D	D	D
Fajr Sepasi	D	L	L	D	L	D	L	L	D	L	L	L	L	D	W	W	D	L	L	L	D	D	W	W	L	L	D	D	D	W	W	D	W	W
Rah Ahan	L	D	W	D	L	W	W	L	D	W	D	D	W	W	D	D	L	L	L	L	D	D	W	D	L	L	L	L	D	D	L	W	L	L
Kheybar Khorramabad	D	L	D	L	L	L	L	W	W	D	W	D	L	L	W	L	D	D	D	D	L	L	L	W	W	W	L	D	L	L	L	W	D	L
Foolad Yazd	D	L	D	D	L	L	L	W	D	D	L	D	D	W	L	L	L	D	D	L	W	L	L	L	D	L	D	W	D	W	L	W	L	L
Est. Ahvaz	L	L	L	D	D	D	L	L	L	D	L	L	L	D	L	L	L	D	D	D	L	L	D	D	L	D	L	L	L	L	L	L	L	L

Source: lig1.ir
W = Win; D = Draw; L = Lose

== Statistics ==
=== Top scorers ===
Position	Player	Club	Goals
1	(Iran) Mohammad Abbaszadeh	Nassaji Mazandaran	24
2	(Iran) Hamid Kazemi	Khooneh be Khooneh	15
3	(Iran) Soheil Haghshenas	Sepidrood Rasht	13
4	(Iran) Mehrdad Avakh	Gol Gohar	11
4	(Iran) Amir Mirbozorgi	Oxin Alborz	11
6	(Iran) Mehdi Ghaedi	Iranjavan	10
7	(Iran) Akbar Saghiri	Gol Gohar	9
7	(Iran) Mehdi Daghagheleh	Mes Rafsanjan	9
9	(Iran) Ali Gholamrezapour	Fajr Sepasi	8
9	(Iran) Rouhollah Bagheri	Khooneh Be Khooneh	8

Notes:
Updated to games played on 1 May 2017. Source: lig1.ir

== Attendances ==
=== Average home attendances ===
Pos	Team	Total	High	Low	Average	Change
1	Nassaji	155,000	15,000	0	10,333	+15.7%
2	Sepidrood	150,000	20,000	0	9,375	n/a
3	Khooneh be Khooneh	49,500	6,000	0	4,125	+21.1%
4	Malavan	61,843	8,000	1,000	3,638	−12.0%
5	Pars Jonoubi Jam	46,250	10,000	250	2,721	n/a
6	Kheybar	46,000	5,000	1,000	2,706	−63.5%
7	Gol Gohar	39,500	3,000	1,000	2,324	+16.2%
8	Aluminium Arak	35,500	5,000	500	2,088	−39.7%
9	Mes Kerman	33,600	7,000	500	1,976	+63.0%
10	Naft MIS	31,500	4,000	0	1,969	−11.8%
11	Fajr Sepasi	32,500	3,000	500	1,918	−52.5%
11	Iranjavan	32,500	3,000	1,000	1,918	+8.9%
13	Est. Ahvaz	13,900	2,000	0	927	−47.7%
14	Foolad Yazd	10,500	1,000	0	750	+94.3%
15	Mes Rafsanjan	10,800	2,000	100	675	−26.1%
16	Oxin Alborz	10,000	4,000	50	588	n/a
17	Baadraan Tehran	9,050	2,500	100	532	n/a
18	Rah Ahan	3,200	500	50	188	−94.7%
	League total	771,193	20,000	0	2,650	+4.4%

Updated to games played on 1 May 2017
Source: lig1.ir
Notes:
Matches with spectator bans are not included in average attendances
Esteghlal Ahvaz, Malavan and Rah Ahan played last season in Persian Gulf Pro League
Baadraan Tehran, Oxin Alborz, Pars Jonoubi Jam and Sepidrood played last season in League 2

=== Attendances by round ===
Team/Round	1	2	3	4	5	6	7	8	9	10	11	12	13	14	15	16	17	18	19	20	21	22	23	24	25	26	27	28	29	30	31	32	33	34	Average
Aluminium Arak	2,000	A	2,000	A	3,000	A	A	3,000	A	3,000	A	2,000	A	2,000	A	5,000	A	A	1,000	A	3,000	A	3,000	2,000	A	2,000	A	500	A	500	A	500	A	1,000	2,088
Baadraan Tehran	A	1,000	A	1,000	A	1,500	A	300	A	200	A	300	200	A	200	A	150	2,500	A	1,000	A	300	A	100	A	100	A	500	A	A	100	A	100	A	532
Esteghlal Ahvaz	A	NC	A	NC	A	1,500	A	400	A	500	A	1,000	A	500	A	A	1,000	1,000	A	2,000	A	1,000	A	1,000	A	1,000	A	500	A	1,000	A	500	1,000	A	927
Fajr Sepasi	A	2,000	A	3,000	A	500	A	3,000	500	A	500	A	1,000	A	3,000	A	2,000	2,000	A	2,000	A	2,000	A	2,000	A	A	2,000	A	2,000	A	2,000	A	3,000	A	1,918
Foolad Yazd	200	A	1,000	A	700	A	700	A	A	200	A	1,000	A	NC	A	NC	A	A	NC	A	400	A	800	A	800	700	A	1,000	A	1,000	A	1,000	A	1,000	750
Gol Gohar	A	1,500	A	2,000	A	1,500	1,000	A	1,500	A	2,000	A	3,000	A	2,000	A	2,000	2,000	A	3,000	A	3,000	A	A	3,000	A	3,000	A	3,000	A	3,000	A	3,000	A	2,324
Iranjavan	A	1,000	2,000	A	2,000	A	2,000	A	2,000	A	2,000	A	2,000	A	2,000	A	3,000	2,000	A	A	1,500	A	1,500	A	1,500	A	1,000	A	2,000	A	2,000	A	3,000	A	1,918
Kheybar Khorramabad	A	2,000	A	5,000	A	2,000	A	2,000	A	1,500	A	1,500	A	3,000	1,000	A	5,000	4,000	A	5,000	A	1,000	A	2,000	A	3,000	A	3,000	A	3,000	A	A	2,000	A	2,706
Khooneh be Khooneh	6,000	A	4,000	A	A	5,000	A	3,000	A	4,000	A	5,000	A	NC	A	NC	A	A	NC	A	2,500	5,000	A	3,000	A	2,000	A	6,000	A	NC	A	4,000	A	NC	4,125
Malavan	A	1,500	A	7,000	A	3,000	A	5,000	A	1,403	1,000	A	3,000	A	1,640	A	2,000	5,800	A	2,000	A	1,500	A	2,000	A	5,000	A	A	6,000	A	6,000	A	8,000	A	3,638
Mes Kerman	2,000	A	1,000	A	1,000	A	1,000	A	1,000	A	1,500	A	600	A	1,000	A	1,000	A	1,500	A	1,500	A	2,000	A	7,000	A	5,000	A	3,000	A	3,000	A	500	A	1,976
Mes Rafsanjan	A	1,000	A	500	A	1,000	A	1,000	A	500	A	150	A	500	A	150	A	150	A	1,000	A	1,000	A	2,000	A	1,000	A	100	A	100	A	200	A	-	675
Naft Masjed Soleyman	1,500	A	2,000	A	4,000	A	3,500	A	2,000	A	1,000	A	2,000	A	2,000	2,000	A	A	2,000	A	1,500	A	2,000	A	1,500	A	1,500	A	NC	A	2,000	A	A	1,000	1,969
Nassaji Mazandaran	A	6,000	A	10,000	7,000	A	8,000	A	12,000	A	15,000	A	9,000	A	10,000	A	10,000	15,000	A	12,000	A	A	12,000	A	9,000	A	10,000	A	NC	A	10,000	A	NC	A	10,333
Oxin Alborz	500	A	50	A	1,000	A	300	A	300	A	200	A	200	A	A	500	A	A	100	A	250	A	1,000	A	400	A	400	A	500	A	4,000	200	A	100	588
Pars Jonoubi Jam	700	A	A	3,000	A	2,000	A	250	A	2,000	A	1,500	A	1,800	A	2,000	A	A	1,000	1,000	A	2,000	A	1,000	A	2,000	A	3,000	A	3,000	A	10,000	A	10,000	2,721
Rah Ahan	300	A	100	A	100	A	50	A	150	A	500	A	A	200	A	150	A	A	300	A	150	A	500	A	100	A	100	A	200	100	A	100	A	100	188
Sepidrood	5,000	A	5,000	A	7,000	A	3,000	A	8,000	A	A	4,000	A	8,000	A	10,000	A	A	8,000	A	12,000	A	15,000	A	NC	A	8,000	7,000	A	15,000	A	15,000	A	20,000	9,375
Total	18,200	16,000	17,150	31,500	25,800	18,000	19,550	17,950	27,450	13,303	23,700	16,450	21,000	16,000	22,840	19,800	26,150	34,450	13,900	29,000	22,800	16,800	37,800	15,100	23,300	16,800	31,000	21,600	16,700	23,700	32,100	31,500	20,600	33,200	771,193
Average	2,022	2,000	1,906	3,938	2,867	2,000	2,172	1,994	3,050	1,478	2,633	1,828	2,333	2,286	2,538	2,829	2,906	3,828	1,986	3,222	2,533	1,867	4,200	1,678	2,913	1,867	3,444	2,400	2,386	2,963	3,567	3,500	2,575	4,743	2,650

Notes:
Updated to games played on 1 May 2017. Source: lig1.ir
Matches with spectator bans are not included in average attendances
Baadraan Tehran played their matches against Foolad Yazd, Iranjavan, Mes Kerman and Naft MIS at Ekbatan
Esteghlal Ahvaz played their match against Mes Rafsanjan at Ghadir
Fajr Sepasi played their matches against Aluminium Arak, Baadraan Tehran, Esteghlal Ahvaz, Foolad Yazd, Iranjavan, Khooneh be Khooneh, Oxin Alborz, Pars Jonoubi Jam and Mes Kerman at Shahid Dastgheib

=== Highest attendances ===
Rank	Home team	Score	Away team	Attendance	Date	Week	Stadium
1	Sepidrood	3–2	Nassaji	20,000	1 May 2017	34	Dr. Azodi
2	Nassaji	1–2	Khooneh be Khooneh	15,000	23 October 2016	10	Vatani
2	Nassaji	0–1	Oxin Alborz	15,000	6 January 2017	18	Vatani
2	Sepidrood	0–0	Pars Jonoubi Jam	15,000	4 February 2017	23	Dr. Azodi
2	Sepidrood	1–0	Mes Kerman	15,000	5 April 2017	30	Dr. Azodi
2	Sepidrood	1–1	Iranjavan	15,000	17 April 2017	32	Dr. Azodi
7	Nassaji	3–0	Esteghlal Ahvaz	12,000	7 October 2016	9	Vatani
7	Nassaji	2–1	Iranjavan	12,000	19 January 2017	20	Vatani
7	Sepidrood	1–1	Malavan	12,000	25 January 2017	21	Dr. Azodi
7	Nassaji	0–1	Fajr Sepasi	12,000	6 February 2017	23	Vatani

Notes:
Updated to games played on 1 May 2017. Source: lig1.ir

== See also ==
- 2016–17 Persian Gulf Pro League
- 2016–17 League 2
- 2016–17 League 3
- 2016–17 Hazfi Cup
- 2016 Iranian Super Cup
