= Babak Hatami =

Iranian footballer (born 1986)

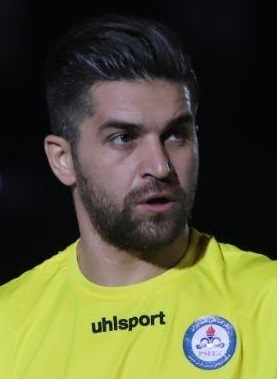

Personal information
- Date of birth: 15 August 1986 (age 40)
- Place of birth: Tabriz, Iran
- Height: 1.73 m (5 ft 8 in)
- Positions: Right back; left back

Team information
- Current team: Tolo Pasargad (manager)

Senior career*
Years	Team	Apps	(Gls)
2007–2013	Shahrdari Tabriz	57	(3)
2011–2012	→ Aluminium (loan)	23	(0)
2013–2014	Saipa	40	(0)
2014–2016	Persepolis	25	(0)
2016–2017	Gostaresh Foulad	24	(0)
2017–2018	Padideh	3	(0)
2018–2019	Sepidrood	1	(0)
2019–2020	Pars Jonoubi	14	(0)
2020–2021	Shahin Bushehr	4	(0)

Managerial career
- 2022: Omid Vahdat Khorasan (assistant)
- 2024: Navad Urmia (assistant)
- 2024–: Tolo Pasargad
- * Club domestic league appearances and goals

Babak Hatami (Persian: بابک حاتمی; born 15 August 1986) is an Iranian football coach and a former defender who is the manager of Tolo Pasargad.

== Club career ==
He started his career with Shahrdari Tabiz. In the summer of 2013 he joined Saipa.

=== Persepolis ===
He joined Iranian giants, Persepolis late in December 2014 after agreement signing between Persepolis and Saipa with a fee around 2 billion R (about US$70,000). He signed 18-month contract with The Reds which kept him until end of 2015–16 season with Tehrani side.

== Club career statistics ==
As of 31 December 2015

Club	Division	Season	League		Hazfi Cup		Asia		Total	
Club	Division	Season	Apps	Goals	Apps	Goals	Apps	Goals	Apps	Goals
Shahrdari Tabriz	Pro League	2010–11	21	0	2	0	–	–	23	0
Aluminium	Division 1	2011–12	23	0	0	0	–	–	23	0
Shahrdari Tabriz	Division 1	2012–13	21	0	0	0	–	–	21	0
Saipa	Pro League	2013–14	26	0	1	0	–	–	27	0
Saipa	Pro League	2014–15	13	0	1	0	–	–	14	0
Persepolis	Pro League	2014–15	11	0	0	0	6	0	17	0
Persepolis	Pro League	2015–16	8	0	2	0	–	–	10	0
Career totals			123	0	6	0	6	0	135	0

- Assist Goals

Season	Team	Assists
14–15	Persepolis	1
15–16	Persepolis	1
