= Masoud Homami =

Iranian footballer

Personal information
- Full name: Masoud Homami
- Date of birth: May 1, 1983 (age 43)
- Place of birth: Esfahan, Iran
- Height: 1.83 m (6 ft 0 in)
- Position: Goalkeeper

Senior career*
Years	Team	Apps	(Gls)
2004–2008	Sepahan	25	(0)
2008–2009	Moghavemat Sepasi	28	(0)
2009–2010	Rah Ahan	22	(0)
2010–2012	Shahrdari Tabriz	25	(0)
2012–2014	Zob Ahan	26	(0)
2014–2015	Paykan	13	(0)
2015	Persepolis	1	(0)
2015–2016	Pas Hamedan	19	(0)
2016–2017	Tractor Sazi	2	(0)
2017	Siah Jamegan	7	(0)
2017–2018	Mashin Sazi	3	(0)
- * Club domestic league appearances and goals

Masoud Homami (Persian: مسعود همامی, born 1 May 1983) is an Iranian football goalkeeper who is a member of Mashin sazi in the Azadegan League. He is a former member of Sepahan and Zob Ahan.

== Club career ==
=== Club career statistics ===
As of 10 April 2014.

Club	Division	Season	League		Hazfi Cup		Asia		Total	
Club	Division	Season	Apps	Goals	Apps	Goals	Apps	Goals	Apps	Goals
Sepahan	Pro League	2004–05	1	0		0	0	0		0
Sepahan	Pro League	2005–06	5	0		0	–	–		0
Sepahan	Pro League	2006–07	9	0		0		0		0
Sepahan	Pro League	2007–08	10	0		0	2	0		0
Moghavemat	Pro League	2008–09	28	0		0	–	–		0
Rah Ahan	Pro League	2009–10	22	0	0	0	–	–	22	0
Shahrdari; Tabriz	Pro League	2010–11	22	0	1	0	–	–	23	0
Shahrdari; Tabriz	Pro League	2011–12	3	0	0	0	–	–	3	0
Zob Ahan	Pro League	2012–13	11	0	0	0	–	–	11	0
Zob Ahan	Pro League	2013–14	1	0	0	0	–	–	1	0
Paykan	Division 1	2013–14	13	0	0	0	–	–	13	0
Paykan	Pro League	2014–15	0	0	0	0	–	–	0	0
Persepolis	Pro League	2014–15	1	0	0	0	0	0	1	0
Career total			126	0		0		0		0
