= Majid Ayoubi =

Iranian footballer

Personal information
- Date of birth: 21 September 1980 (age 46)
- Place of birth: Chalous, Iran
- Height: 1.78 m (5 ft 10 in)
- Position: Defender

Team information
- Current team: Shahrdari Noshahr (assistant coach)

Youth career
- 1997–1999: Shamoushak
- 1999–2001: Nassaji

Senior career*
Years	Team	Apps	(Gls)
2001–2016	Saipa	329	(3)
2016–2017	Mes Kerman	23	(0)
2017–2018	Naft Masjed Soleyman	33	(1)
2018–2019	Aluminium Arak	15	(0)
2019	Shahin Bushehr	4	(0)
2019–2020	Qashqai	26	(0)
2020–2023	Shahrdari Noshahr		

Managerial career
- 2023–: Shahrdari Noshahr (assistant)
- * Club domestic league appearances and goals

Majid Ayoubi (Persian: مجید ایوبی; born 21 September 1980) is an Iranian football coach and a former defender. He is an assistant coach with Shahrdari Noshahr.

== Club career ==
=== Early years ===
Ayoubi started his career with Shamoushak from youth levels. He also spent few seasons with Nassaji.

=== Saipa ===
He joined Saipa in summer 2001 and since then he has been a regular player of the club. In June 2014 he extended for another two years with Saipa.

== Club career statistics ==
As of 24 January 2019

Club	Division	Season	League		Hazfi Cup		Asia		Total	
Club	Division	Season	Apps	Goals	Apps	Goals	Apps	Goals	Apps	Goals
Saipa	Pro League	2001–02	13	0	0	0	–	–	13	0
Saipa	Pro League	2002–03	22	0	3	0	–	–	25	0
Saipa	Pro League	2003–04	24	0	2	0	–	–	26	0
Saipa	Pro League	2004–05	24	0	2	0	–	–	26	0
Saipa	Pro League	2005–06	28	1	1	0	–	–	29	1
Saipa	Pro League	2006–07	0	0	0	0	–	–	0	0
Saipa	Pro League	2007–08	20	0	0	0	7	0	20	0
Saipa	Pro League	2008–09	23	0	1	0	–	–	24	0
Saipa	Pro League	2009–10	26	0	1	0	–	–	27	0
Saipa	Pro League	2010–11	22	0	0	0	–	–	22	0
Saipa	Pro League	2011–12	28	0	1	0	–	–	29	0
Saipa	Pro League	2012–13	32	1	1	0	–	–	33	1
Saipa	Pro League	2013–14	29	0	1	0	–	–	30	0
Saipa	Pro League	2014–15	28	0	2	0	–	–	30	0
Saipa	Pro League	2015–16	0	0	0	0	–	–	0	0
Mes Kerman	Azadegan League	2016–17	23	0	1	0	–	–	24	0
Naft MIS	Azadegan League	2017–18	33	1	2	0	–	–	35	1
aluminium Arak	Azadegan League	2018–19	0	0	0	0	–	–	0	0
Career Totals			340	2	15	0	7	0	362	2

== Honours ==
=== Club ===
Saipa

- Iran Pro League (1): 2006–07
