= Fernando Gabriel =

Brazilian footballer (born 1988)

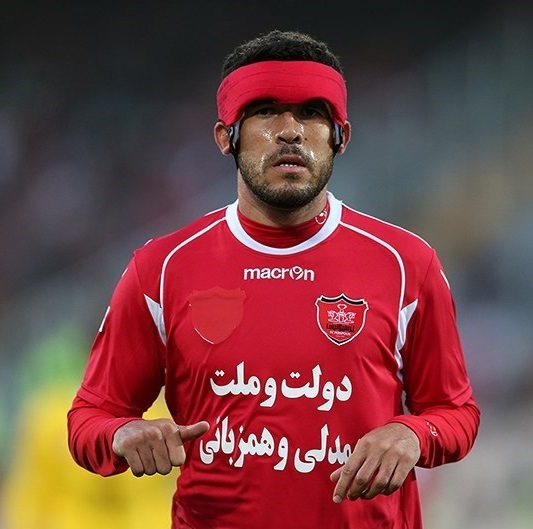
- Fernando Gabriel in 2014.

Personal information
- Full name: Fernando Gabriel Vougado Ribeiro
- Date of birth: May 11, 1988 (age 38)
- Place of birth: Eldorado, Brazil
- Height: 1.79 m (5 ft 10 in)
- Position: Attacking midfielder

Youth career
- 2006: Sao Caetano
- 2007–2008: Internacional

Senior career*
Years	Team	Apps	(Gls)
2008	ADAP		
2009	Araguaína		
2010	Mogi Mirim	0	(0)
2010	Parana	4	(2)
2011	Figueirense	0	(0)
2011	Criciúma	3	(1)
2012	Bragantino	21	(5)
2013	Ituano	0	(0)
2013–2014	Parana	22	(3)
2014–2015	Khazar Lankaran	12	(3)
2015	Persepolis	13	(0)
2015–2016	Al-Faisaly	2	(0)
2016	Ferroviária	0	(0)
2016	Santa Cruz	9	(1)
2016	Grêmio Novorizontino		
2017	Paysandu	7	(2)
2017–2018	Hatta	16	(10)
2018–2020	Fujairah	41	(10)
2020–2021	Al-Adalah	30	(8)
2021–2022	Hajer	29	(5)
2022–2023	Al Hamriyah		
- * Club domestic league appearances and goals as of 03:59, 20 June 2016 (UTC)

Fernando Gabriel Vougado Ribeiro (born 11 May 1988) is a Brazilian footballer who plays as an attacking midfielder.

== Career ==
In August 2014, Fernando Gabriel moved from Paraná Clube to Azerbaijan Premier League side FK Khazar Lankaran, leaving the club in December of the same year.

=== Persepolis ===
He signed with Iran Pro League side Persepolis in January 2015. Gabriel missed a penalty kick on his debut in a 1–0 loss to Malavan. On 24 February 2015 Gabriel assisted Mohsen Bengar's goal in Persepolis' 3–0 win over Lekhwiya in the AFC Champions League.

=== Hajer ===
On 6 August 2021, Gabriel joined Hajer.

=== Al Hamriyah ===
On 6 August 2022, Gabriel joined UAE First Division League side Al Hamriyah.

== Career statistics ==
As of 16 May 2015.

Club	Season	League			Cup (Note: Includes Copa do Brasil, Turkish Cup and Hazfi Cup)		Continental (Note: Includes Copa Libertadores, Copa Sudamericana, Recopa Sudamericana and AFC Champions League)		Other (Note: Includes Campeonato Catarinense, Campeonato Paulista & Campeonato Paranaense)		Total	
Club	Season	Division	Apps	Goals	Apps	Goals	Apps	Goals	Apps	Goals	Apps	Goals
2010	Mogi Mirim	—	–	–	–	–	–	–	6	1	6	1
2010	Paraná	Série B	4	2	–	–	–	–	–	–	4	2
2011	Figueirense	—	–	–	–	–	–	–	5	1	5	1
2011	Criciúma	Série B	3	1	–	–	–	–	–	–	3	1
2012	Bragantino	Série B	21	5	–	–	–	–	21	6	42	11
2013	Ituano	—	–	–	–	–	–	–	18	4	18	4
2013	Paraná	Série B	22	3	–	–	–	–	–	–	22	3
2014	Paraná	—	–	–	–	–	–	–	13	2	13	2
Brazil			50	11	0	0	0	0	63	14	113	25
2014–15	Khazar Lankaran	Premier League	12	3	0	0	–	–	–	–	12	3
Azerbaijan			12	3	0	0	0	0	0	0	12	3
2014–15	Persepolis	Pro League	9	0	0	0	4	0	–	–	13	0
Iran			9	0	0	0	4	0	0	0	13	0
Total			71	14	0	0	4	0	63	14	138	28

== Honours ==
Paysandu

- Campeonato Paraense: 2017
