= Mojtaba Ramezani =

Iranian footballer

Personal information
- Full name: Mojtaba Ramezani
- Date of birth: December 12, 1989 (age 36)
- Place of birth: Qaemshahr, Iran
- Position: Attacking midfielder

Youth career
- 2006–2007: Iran Sanat Koucheksara
- 2007–2008: Shohadaye Koucheksara
- 2008–2010: Tappesh Qaemshahr

Senior career*
Years	Team	Apps	(Gls)
2010–2011	Moghavemat Koutna		
2011–2013	Esteghlal Lammuk Qaemshahr		
2012–2013	→ Nassaji (loan)	17	(7)
2013–2014	Nassaji	22	(6)
2014–2016	Saipa	37	(2)
2016–2017	Nassaji	10	(1)
2017–2018	Khooneh be Khooneh	25	(4)
2018–2019	Esteghlal Khuzestan	3	(1)
- * Club domestic league appearances and goals as of 15 May 2015

Mojtaba Ramezani (Persian: مجتبی رمضانی); is an Iranian football midfielder who currently plays for Iranian football club in the Persian Gulf Pro League.

== Club career ==
=== Early years ===
He started his career in Qaemshahr with several clubs. In Qaemshahr Division 1 and Division 2, he helped Esteghlal Lammuk to be promoted to Mazandaran Super League.

=== Nassaji ===
After success in Nassaji technical test, he was signed by the club on loan from Esteghlal Lammuk. At his first season in Nassaji he helped Mohammad Abbaszadeh to score 18 times in 2013–14 Azadegan League. He had offers from Tractor Sazi & Rah Ahan after shining in Division 1, but he signed a contract with Nassaji for another year. He started the season in Nassaji's line up and scored 4 times until mid-season. In winter transfer window he had an offer from Saba Qom but Nassaji denied any offer received for him and forced him to stay at their club. He finished the season with 19 appearances and 5 goals.

=== Saipa ===
Ramezani joined Saipa in summer 2014. He made his debut for Saipa against Gostaresh Foulad as a substitute for Mehdi Torabi in August 2014.

== Club career statistics ==
As of 15 May 2015

Club	Division	Season	League		Hazfi Cup		Asia		Total	
Club	Division	Season	Apps	Goals	Apps	Goals	Apps	Goals	Apps	Goals
Nassaji	Division 1	2012–13	17	7	0	0	–	–	17	7
Nassaji	Division 1	2013–14	22	6	0	0	–	–	22	6
Saipa	Pro League	2014–15	19	2	1	0	–	–	20	2
Career Totals			58	15	1	0	0	0	59	15
