= Mehdi Daghagheleh =

Iranian football striker

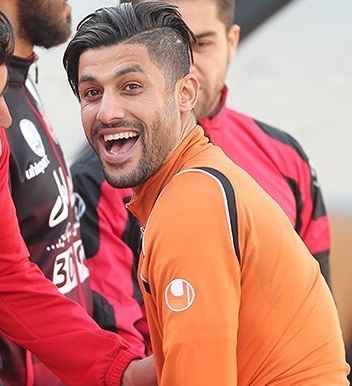

Personal information
- Full name: Mehdi Daghagheleh
- Date of birth: January 30, 1990 (age 36)
- Place of birth: Ahvaz, Khuzestan, Iran
- Height: 1.78 m (5 ft 10 in)
- Positions: Striker; winger

Team information
- Current team: Naft Maysan
- Number: 34

Senior career*
Years	Team	Apps	(Gls)
2007–2010	Esteghlal Ahvaz	56	(7)
2010–2012	Malavan	43	(4)
2012–2013	Sanat Naft Abadan	23	(0)
2013–2014	Malavan	20	(11)
2014–2015	Persepolis	8	(0)
2015–2016	Foolad	16	(1)
2016	Saipa	9	(1)
2016–2017	Mes Kerman	17	(8)
2017–2018	Fajr Sepasi	12	(1)
2018	Gol Gohar	15	(3)
2018–2019	Shahin Bushehr	13	(2)
2019–	Naft Maysan	0	(0)
2021	Al-Hudood SC	0	(0)

International career^{‡}
2006–2007	Iran U17	4	(1)
2007–2009	Iran U20	8	(2)
2010–2011	Iran U23	7	(1)
- * Club domestic league appearances and goals as of 20 January 2017 ‡ National team caps and goals as of 23 February 2011

Mehdi Daghagheleh (Persian: مهدی دغاغله, born 30 January 1990 in Khuzestan) is an Iranian football striker who plays for Naft Maysan in Iraqi Premier League.

== Club career ==
=== Early career ===
He began his career in Esteghlal Ahvaz, he played three seasons for Esteghlal Ahvaz then moved to Sanat Naft and play two season there.

=== Malavan ===
He played three seasons for Malavan and scored 16 goal. He scored 11 goal for Malavan in the 2013–14 season and Malavan fans selected Daghagheleh as the club's best Malavan player in the 2013–14 Persian Gulf Cup.

=== Persepolis ===
He signed a two-year contract with Persepolis on 22 May 2014.

== Club career ==
As of 26 May 2015.

Club	Division	Season	League		Hazfi Cup		Asia		Total	
Club	Division	Season	Apps	Goals	Apps	Goals	Apps	Goals	Apps	Goals
Esteghlal; Ahvaz	Pro League	2007–08	6	0			–	–		
Esteghlal; Ahvaz	Pro League	2008–09	29	5	2	0	–	–	31	5
Esteghlal; Ahvaz	Pro League	2009–10	21	2		0	–	–		2
Malavan	Pro League	2010–11	20	0	3	1	–	–	23	1
Malavan	Pro League	2011–12	23	5			–	–		
Sanat Naft	Pro League	2012–13	23	3			–	–		
Malavan	Pro League	2013–14	20	11	1	0	–	–	21	11
Persepolis	Pro League	2014–15	6	0	2	0	0	0	8	0
Career total			131	19			0	0		

- Assist Goals

Season	Team	Assists
07–08	Esteghlal Ahvaz	1
08–09	Esteghlal Ahvaz	3
10–11	Malavan	2
11–12	Malavan	4
12–13	Sanat Naft	1
13–14	Malavan	2

== Other Websites ==
Mehdi Daghagheleh on Instagram
