= Ahmad Salehi =

Iranian football referee (born 1972)

- Full name: Seyyed Ahmad Salehi
- Born: March 21, 1972 (age 54); Isfahan, Iran
- Other occupation: Expert of Physical Education

Domestic
Years	League	Role
2007–	Persian Gulf Pro League	Referee

Ahmad Salehi (Persian: احمد صالحی) is an Iranian football referee.

== Awards ==
- Referee of the year (1): 2014–15
