= Mohammad Abbaszadeh =

Iranian footballer

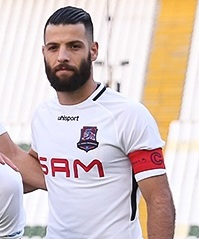
- Abbaszadeh in the uniform of Nassaji Mazandaran

Personal information
- Date of birth: 9 May 1990 (age 36)
- Place of birth: Qaem Shahr, Mazandaran, Iran
- Height: 1.84 m (6 ft 1/2 in)
- Position: Striker

Team information
- Current team: Zob Ahan
- Number: 90

Youth career
- 2007–2009: Moghavemat Sari

Senior career*
Years	Team	Apps	(Gls)
2009–2010	Moghavemat Sari	20	(9)
2011–2012	Sanat Sari	22	(6)
2012–2013	Nassaji Mazandaran	23	(18)
2013–2015	Persepolis	27	(10)
2015–2016	Rah Ahan	8	(1)
2016–2017	Nassaji Mazandaran	33	(24)
2017–2018	Saipa	19	(7)
2018–2020	Nassaji Mazandaran	50	(21)
2020–2023	Tractor	84	(34)
2023–2024	Foolad	2	(1)
2024	Nassaji Mazandaran	16	(3)
2025	Zob Ahan	2	(0)
- * Club domestic league appearances and goals as of 4 April 2025

Mohammad Abbaszadeh (Persian: محمد عباس‌زاده; born 9 May 1990) is an Iranian professional footballer who plays as a forward for Persian Gulf Pro League club Zob Ahan.

== Career ==
=== Early years ===
Abbaszadeh started his career with Moghavemat Sari. He was part of Moghavemat Sari in Division 2 in 2009–10 Iran Football's 2nd Division. He missed the 2010–11 season and failed to sign any club.

=== Sanat Sari ===
Mohammad Abbaszadeh joined Sanat Sari in 1390 and was able to score 6 goals in 22 games.

=== Nassaji Mazandaran ===
He joined Nassaji in summer 2012 and signed a two-years contract until end of 2013–14 season and was given number 10. He made his debut for Nassaji against Aboomoslem as a starter on 13 September 2012. Abbaszadeh scored 18 times in 23 matches, becoming the league top scorer.

=== Persepolis ===
==== 2013–14 ====
After becoming the Azadegan League's top scorer, Abbaszadeh had offers from many teams, most of those in the Pro League who wanted to acquire him. Persepolis offered €125,000 (4 Billion Rials) up front with an additional equivalent of 1 Billion Rial to be paid in the form of sporting goods from Uhlsport. On 3 May 2013, he signed a three-year contract with Tehran's reds, Persepolis. He made his debut in a friendly match against Arta Ardabil and scored five goals in five pre-season matches for Persepolis. He scored his first goal for Persepolis in a 2–0 home victory over Sepahan in 2013–14 Iran Pro League. He scored an instrumental goal against Damash Gilan in their 1–0 victory on matchday 28 that kept Persepolis' title hopes alive. However, Persepolis finished second at the end of the season. He finished the season with 5 goals in 13 appearances, scoring in 5 of the last 6 games of the season, averaging a goal every 125 minutes. On 2 August 2014, Abbaszadeh was named the Iran Pro League's best young talent for the 2013–14 season.

==== 2014–15 ====
Abbaszadeh played his first match for Persepolis in 2014–15 season in a 1–1 draw with Naft Tehran at Azadi Stadium. He scored his first goal in this season against Padideh with a penalty kick.

=== Nassaji Mazandaran ===
Mohammad Abbaszadeh joined Mazandaran Mazandaran Nassaji for the second time in 2016. In the first season, he promised Hani Nowruzi, Hadi Nowruzi's son, to score 24 goals in memory of his father. Finally, he was able to score 24 goals in League One. Mohammad Abbaszadeh was the Nassaji captain this season and with his beautiful goals he became especially popular among Mazandaran Nassaji fans and Mazandaran Nassaji fans gave him many titles, including Mr. Double, Goal machine, and Shah Shahi.

== Club career statistics ==
As of 1 July 2021.

Club	Division	Season	League		Hazfi Cup		Asia		Total	
Club	Division	Season	Apps	Goals	Apps	Goals	Apps	Goals	Apps	Goals
Sanat Sari	Division 1	2011–12	22	6	0	0	–	–	22	6
Nassaji	Division 1	2012–13	23	18	0	0	–	–	23	18
Persepolis	Pro League	2013–14	9	5	1	1	–	–	10	6
Persepolis	Pro League	2014–15	18	5	1	1	0	0	19	6
Rah Ahan	Pro League	2015–16	8	1	0	0	–	–	8	1
Nassaji	Division 1	2016–17	33	24	0	0	–	–	33	24
Saipa	Pro League	2017–18	17	6	0	0	–	–	17	6
Nassaji	Division 1	2017–18	?	?	?	?	–	–	?	?
Nassaji	Pro League	2018–19	?	?	?	?	–	–	?	?
Nassaji	Pro League	2019–20	16	4			–	–	16	4
Tractor	Pro League	2020–21	24	10	0	0	1	2	25	12
Career Totals			184	79	2	2	1	2	186	83

== Honours ==
Individual

- Azadegan League Top Goalscorer: 2012–13 (18 goals), 2016–17 (24 goals)
- Azadegan League Player of the season: 2012–13, 2016–17
- Iranian Young Footballer of the Year: 2014
