= Daylight saving time in Turkey =

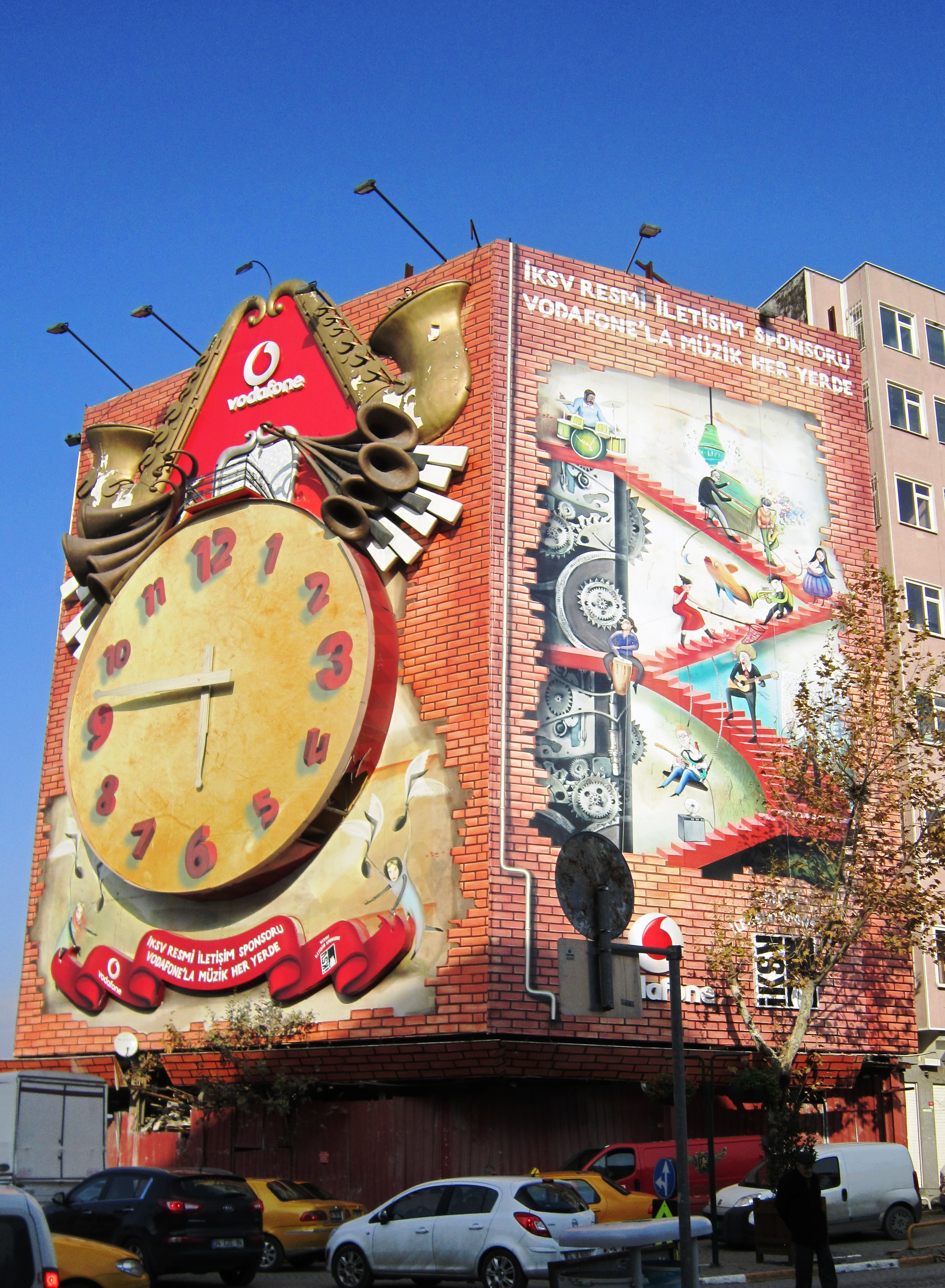
Clock in Istanbul.

Daylight saving time in Turkey was implemented throughout the country in the periods of 1940 to 1952, 1962 to 1965, 1973 to 1978, and 1985 through 2016. In 2016, Turkey scrapped winter time, by permanently staying in UTC+03:00 daylight saving time zone after 8 September.

Whether daylight saving time is beneficial or not was a controversial issue. In this regard, the Ministry of Energy and Natural Resources had published various surveys and articles in order to make the subject known to the broader public and to form an opinion. With the decision of the Cabinet convened in 2013, the practice was terminated with the decision to turn the clocks back one hour on 27 October 2013.

== History ==
It is believed that the practice of daylight saving time started to be discussed in Turkey with the enactment of Law No. 697 from 26 December 1925. There are different sources regarding the history of the practice. It was observed that the practice was adopted with a delay by the rural people before the 1950s. The practice officially started with the decision of the Council of Ministers that came into force on 1 July 1940. The practice was suspended between 1952–1961. Likewise, the practice was suspended between 1965–1972. Afterwards, the implementation continued uninterrupted. In 2008, the Ministry of Energy and Natural Resources recommended the abolition of the application, creating and using the UTC+02:30 time zone, but no progress was made on this proposal.

For the year 2011, Turkey switched to European Summer Time at 3:00 am (03:00) on Monday 28 March, one day later than the rest of Europe, to avoid disrupting the national university entrance examinations held on 27 March.

The Ministry of Energy and Natural Resources decided to abolish the application as of 2013. Starting from March 2013, it was planned to terminate the practice by staying in summer time and GMT+3 time zone. However, this proposal was later abandoned.

According to the decree of the Council of Ministers from 7 September 2016, summer time has been made permanent in Turkey.

== Application ==
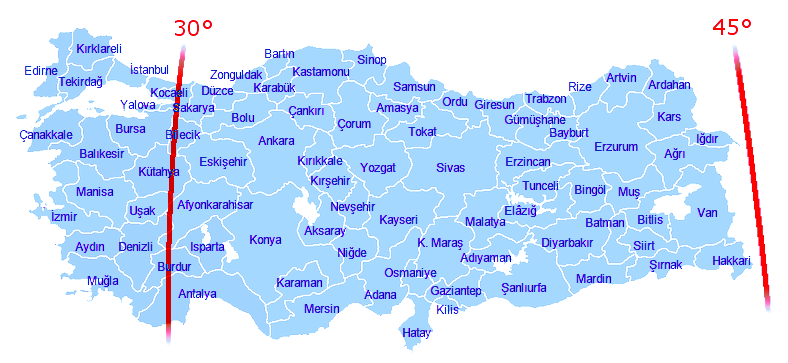
The locations of the 30th meridian and 45th meridian

Turkey is between 26th meridian east and 45th meridian east. Since there are 19 meridians between the easternmost and westernmost parts of Turkey, there is a time difference of 1 hour and 16 minutes between the easternmost and westernmost points. Prior to 2016, Turkey used the time of the 30th meridian east. Therefore, Coordinated Universal Time+2 (UTC+2) was used in Turkey, meaning that time in Turkey was two hours ahead of UTC. When the summer time applied, Turkey used the time of the 45th meridian east. Thus, the clocks were advanced one hour and time in Turkey became UTC+3. Daylight saving time (clock moved forward one hour) started on the last Sunday in March and ended on the last Sunday in October. Since 2016, Turkey stopped observing DST and remained in GMT+3 permanently.

== See also ==
- Time in Turkey
