= Hossein Abdi =

Iranian footballer and coach (born 1967)

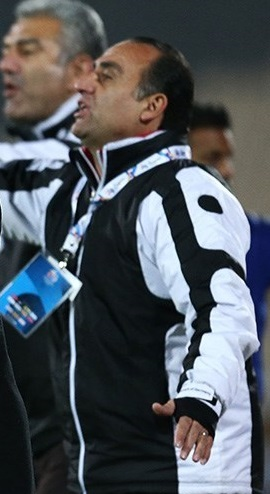
- Abdi with Persepolis in 2014

Personal information
- Full name: Hossein Abdi
- Date of birth: 21 March 1967 (age 59)
- Place of birth: Tehran, Iran
- Position: Midfielder

Team information
- Current team: Iran U23 (manager)

Youth career
- 1984–1987: Persepolis

Senior career*
| Years | Team | Apps | (Gls) |
| 1987–2000 | Persepolis | 261 | (15) |

Managerial career
- 2007–2008: Wind Dubai
- 2008–2009: Damash Gilan
- 2009–2010: Persepolis B
- 2009–2011: Persepolis (assistant)
- 2014–2015: Persepolis (assistant)
- 2015: Persepolis (caretaker)
- 2016–2018: Persepolis B
- 2018–2019: Iran Women (adviser)
- 2019–2024: Iran U17
- 2024–2026: Iran U20
- 2026–: Iran U23
- * Club domestic league appearances and goals

Hossein Abdi (Persian: حسین عبدی; born 21 March 1967) is an Iranian professional football manager and former player who is the manager of the Iran national under-23 team.

== Club career ==
Abdi spent his entire playing career (1987-2000) with Persepolis, also captaining the team. The team won the regional Tehran Provincial League in 1987/88, 1988/89, 1989/90, and 1990/91. They then won the Azadegan League (then the top-level football league in Iran) in 1995/96, 1996/97, 1998/99, and 1999/2000.

== Managerial career ==
Abdi was the head coach of Damash Gilan in 2009. He left the club to serve as the assistant coach for Persepolis from 2009 to 2010. Under head coach Ali Daeli, the team won the Iran Hazfi Cup. Abdi did not continue with the team due to financial issues.

In 2015, Abdi served briefly as the interim manager of Persepolis. He was a technical advisor for the Iran women's national football team in 2018 and 2019.

After previous coach Abbas Chamanian was sacked for a poor result at the 2018 AFC U-16 Championship, Abdi was appointed as head coach of the Iran U-17 football team in 2019. He managed the U-16 team for the 2020 AFC U-16 Championship prior to the tournament's cancellation.

In 2022, he returned to the U-17 team in order to prepare them for the 2023 AFC U-17 Asian Cup held in Bahrain. Iran won their group and progressed through the quarterfinals after beating Yemen on penalty kicks, but lost to Japan in the semi-finals.
