= Persepolis B F.C. =

Persepolis B
- Full name: Persepolis B Football Club
- Short name: Persepolis B
- Founded: 1964; 64 years ago 2009 (refounded); 14 years ago 2016 (refounded) 10 years ago
- Ground: Shahid Kazemi Stadium
- Capacity: 15,000
- Chairman: Peyman Haddadi
- Head Coach: Jalal Hosseini
- League: League 2
- Website: http://fc-perspolis.com/
Home colours	Away colours

Persepolis B Football Club (Persian: باشگاه فوتبال پرسپولیس ب) is an Iranian professional football team based in Tehran, Iran. They are the reserve and second team of Persepolis The club was refounded in 2016 after being inactive for three years.

== History ==
The club was founded in 2009 as the reserve or second team of Persepolis signing talented youth players of the club. They became champion of Tehran Province League and promoted to 3rd Division. Esmaeil Halali was named head coach on 12 November 2010, replacing Hossein Abdi. In July 2013, C team and former first-team manager Vinko Begović was promoted as B team's head coach but he resigned three months later to become head coach of an Azadegan League side club. Former team captain Mojtaba Moharrami was appointed as team's head coach on 30 October 2013. In 2013 due to financial issues the club decided to temporarily disband the team and instead Persepolis' young talents played for the U–21's.

=== Re-establishment ===
In 2016 the club announced that it would restart the B team for the 2016–17 season. Persepolis B played their first friendly match on 30 May 2016 in a 1–1 draw against the Iran University national football team.

== Current squad ==
Note: Flags indicate national team as defined under FIFA eligibility rules; some limited exceptions apply. Players may hold more than one non-FIFA nationality.

No.	Pos.	Nation	Player
—	GK	IRI	Mohammad Gandomi
—	GK	IRI	Amir Mohammad Ghazvineh
—	DF	IRI	Amir Hossein Taheri
—	DF	IRI	Pouya Esmi
—	DF	IRI	Ali Rahmannejad
—	DF	IRI	Shahin Kia Daliri
—	DF	IRI	Yaghoub Barage
—	MF	IRI	Alireza Enayatzadeh

No.	Pos.	Nation	Player
—	MF	IRI	Koroush Ezhdehakosh
—	MF	IRI	Mohammad Hossein Sadeghi
—	MF	IRI	Mehdi Cheshmberah
—	MF	IRI	Elyar Rahmani
—	MF	IRI	Arshia Mohammadabadi
—	FW	IRI	Mohammad Hossein Momeni
—	FW	IRI	Abolfazl Ghasemi

For more on the reserve and academy squads, see Persepolis Academy & Persepolis Qaem Shahr

== Season-by-season ==
The table below chronicles the achievements of Persepolis Novin in various competitions since 2011.

Season	League	Position	Hazfi Cup	Notes
2011–12	Tehran Provincial League	1st	Did not qualify	Promoted
2012–13	3rd Division	4th/Group 2	Did not qualify

== Managerial history ==
Reserves Team

- (Iran) Mehrdad Minavand (2009)
- (Iran) Hossein Abdi (2009–2010)
- (Iran) Esmaeil Halali (2010–2013)
- (Iran) Mojtaba Moharrami (2013)
- (Iran) Hossein Abdi (2016–)

== Notable players ==
- (Iran) Ahmad Ahi
- (Iran) Shahryar Fakhimi
- (Iran) Mehdi Khakpour

== Achievements ==
=== Reserves ===
- Tehran Provincial League

Winners: 2011–12

- Tehran Hazfi Cup

Winners: 2011–12
