= Abedzadeh =

Abedzadeh (Persian: عابدزاده) is a surname. Notable people with the surname include:

- Ahmad Reza Abedzadeh (born 1966), Iranian footballer and manager
- Amir Abedzadeh (born 1993), Iranian footballer, son of Ahmad
