= Karim Ansarifard =

Iranian footballer (born 1990)

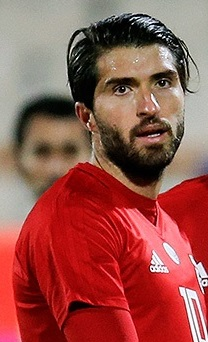
- Ansarifard with Iran at the 2018 FIFA World Cup

Personal information
- Full name: Karim Adil Ansarifard
- Date of birth: 3 April 1990 (age 36)
- Place of birth: Ardabil, Iran
- Height: 1.87 m (6 ft 2 in)
- Position: Forward

Youth career
- 2000–2005: Inter Campus
- 2005–2006: Zob Ahan Ardabil
- 2006–2007: Saipa

Senior career*
Years	Team	Apps	(Gls)
2007–2012	Saipa	123	(55)
2012–2014	Persepolis	31	(8)
2013–2014	→ Tractor	28	(14)
2014–2015	Osasuna	16	(0)
2015–2017	Panionios	41	(13)
2017–2018	Olympiacos	34	(18)
2018–2019	Nottingham Forest	12	(2)
2019–2020	Al-Sailiya	20	(6)
2020–2022	AEK Athens	63	(17)
2022–2024	Omonia	46	(6)
2024	Aris	12	(1)
Total		426	(140)

International career^{‡}
2005–2006	Iran U17	6	(1)
2007–2008	Iran U20	9	(6)
2009–2011	Iran U23	15	(6)
2009–2024	Iran	104	(30)
- * Club domestic league appearances and goals as of 19 May 2024 ‡ National team caps and goals as of 3 February 2024

Karim Adil Ansarifard (Persian: کریم انصاری‌فرد; born 3 April 1990) is an Iranian former professional footballer who played as a forward. His playing style and ability have drawn comparisons to Ali Daei (the coach who scouted him) and he has been named Daei's "successor".

World Soccer selected Ansarifard as one of the best young talents in the world alongside Javier Hernández and Jack Wilshere. In January 2012, FIFA.com selected him as one of the players to watch in 2012. Goal.com also chose him as one of the hottest 100 young football players in the world. Also in 2012, FIFA ranked him as the 48th best goalscorer in the world and second best in Asia.

== Club career ==
=== Saipa ===
During one of Saipa's training camps in Ardabil, Karim's home city, he was taken on a training trial by then-coach Ali Daei and was accepted into the club's youth academy and reserves. In the 2007 season Saipa the Iranian reigning champions encountered problems in scoring after the departure of Mohsen Khalili and retirement of then-coach Ali Daei. After 12 weeks Ali Daei moved Ansarifard to the first team from the reserves and the young starlet answered the coach's faith with good games including the only goal against a strong Sepahan team. Ansarifard scored 13 goals during the 2009–10 season. After strong performances, Karim became fast one of the best players of Saipa and targeted by European clubs such as Borussia Dortmund and Celtic. Later, Steaua București made a €200,000 bid for a half season loan. In May 2011, it was suggested that Everton are interested in signing Ansarifard. Despite major interest from European clubs, conscription problems made the prospect of Ansarifard moving to a foreign club unlikely. Ansarifard renewed his contract with Saipa for another two years on 14 July 2011. In the 2011–12 Iranian Pro League season, Ansarifard scored 21 goals and made 5 assists for Saipa, becoming the league's top scorer.

=== Persepolis ===
There was much speculation during the 2011–12 Iranian Pro League season that Ansarifard would be leaving Saipa. On 17 June 2012 he signed a three-years contract with Persepolis. He was given the number 9 shirt. He scored his first goal in a pre-season match against Aluminium. He made his debut for Persepolis in an official match against Sanat Naft and scored his first goal for Persepolis against Gahar Zagros. He scored his first Hat-trick as a Persepolis player (and second in his career) against Paykan. He scored another hat-trick in the Round of 32 of Hazfi Cup at Malavan. He also scored the Persepolis' first goal in the Hazfi Cup final. His team would go on to lose on penalties. At the start of the season, Ansarifard initially decided to stay at Persepolis despite bids from Sepahan, Tractor and two UAE Pro League sides. However, he fell out with club head coach Ali Daei during pre-season. He was out listed and was eventually transferred to Tractor on 14 July 2013.

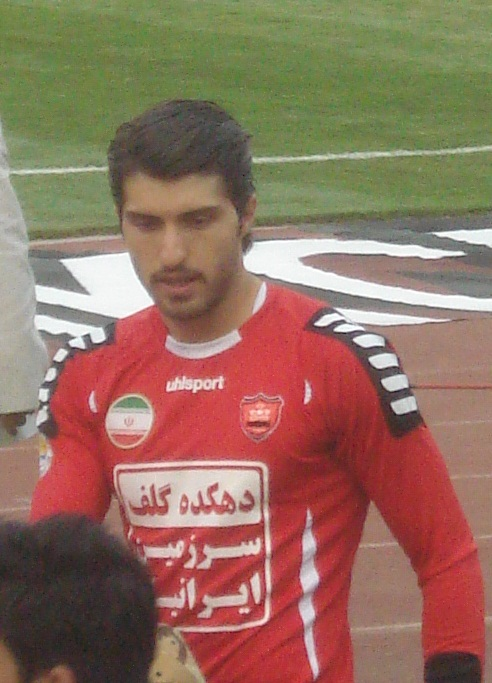
Ansarifard playing for Persepolis against Malavan in 2013

=== Tractor ===
After Persepolis listed him in the out of the squad, he decided to play another season in Iran and joined Tractor. He signed a one-year contract with the option of a transfer to the European leagues in the case of bids. He made his debut on 1 August 2013 in a 1–1 draw in Tabriz derby over Gostaresh Foolad. He won Hazfi Cup title with Tractor and was named as the tournament's Most Valuable Player. Ansarifard scored seventeen goals for Tabriz's reds during his spell at the team, fourteen goals was in the league, making him the season's top scorer for the second time in his professional career. In July 2014 Ansarifard was released by Tractor and was allowed to sign with a European club.

=== Osasuna ===
On 29 August 2014, Ansarifard signed a two-year deal with Segunda División's CA Osasuna. He made his league debut on 4 October 2014, coming on as a substitute for Roberto Torres in the 61st minute against Racing de Santander. He made his first start on 18 October in a 3–2 win against CD Tenerife.

=== Panionios ===
In the summer of 2015, Ansarifard signed with Panionios in the Super League Greece. He scored his first goal for the club in a 5–1 win over Panetolikos on 3 October 2015. He scored the winning goal on 7 November 2015 in a match against Platanias. On 28 November 2015, Ansarifard scored a brace and helped Panionios win against PAS Giannina 2–0. His solo goal in April 2016 during matchday 28 in a victory against PAOK earned him goal of the week honours.

In May 2016, Ansarifard, whose contract was due to run out at the end of next season, was offered to PAOK but the 26-year-old international was not on top of Eagles' shortlist at the time. He started the 2016–17 season as the indisputable leader of club's offence. On 10 September 2016, he scored his first goal for the season in a 3–0 home win against rivals Asteras Tripolis.

=== Olympiacos ===
On 13 January 2017, Ansarifard signed a 3.5-year contract with Greek giants Olympiacos for a transfer fee of €400,000, Panionios held a 10% sell-on clause. He was assigned the number 17. On 24 January 2017, he made his first appearance for the club in a Greek Cup 1–1 away draw against Aris, scoring his first goal to equalise the game.

Ansarifard made his league debut on 11 February 2017 in a 2–0 win against AEL, coming on as a late second-half substitute. On 23 February 2017, Karim scored a brace in his second Europa League game against Osmanlıspor. With Karim's goals Olympiacos advanced to the Round of 16 for the first time since 2012. Karim won the UEFA Europa League Player of the week due to his performance against Osmanlıspor.

Ansarifard scored his first league goal for Olympiacos on 12 March 2017 in a 2–0 victory against Atromitos. On 19 August 2017, on the first match day of the Super League, Ansarifard scored and assisted a goal in his team's 4–1 victory. After helping the Greek giants to a league title, he was unexpectedly left off the UEFA Champions League squad by new manager Besnik Hasi, who put the forward up for sale. On 14 October 2017, he scored a brace against his old club, in an Olympiacos 4–3 away win. On 2 December 2017, he scored a brace sealing a 3–1 home win against Apollon Smyrnis. On 9 December 2017, he bagged a goal and giving an assist to Kostas Fortounis for his second goal in the game, in a glorious 4–1 away Super League win against Panetolikos.

On 24 December 2017, Ansarifard's exceptional performance with Olympiacos sparked what has arguably become the best year of his career. The Albanian manager was fired in late September for poor results and Ansarifard has been able to work himself back into the starting lineup, becoming the league's top scorer thus far with seven goals from 11 matches, being the 6th best Asian player in Europe for the season according to Football Tribe Asia. On 7 January 2018, he scored in a 3–0 away win game against AEL, helping his club to achieve the 7th successive win in his rally to gain the 8th consecutive title. On 15 January 2018, he scored after an assist from Guillaume Gillet sealing a 2–0 home win game against Lamia. On 21 January 2018, Ansarifard was on target in the 26th and 57th minutes for Óscar García’s Super League leaders, chalked up their ninth win in a row with a straightforward 3–0 home victory over 10-man Xanthi at the Georgios Karaiskakis Stadium. He was named MVP of the game. On 28 January 2018, equalised a 1–1 away game against Asteras Tripolis with a penalty kick, when Asteras Tripolis’ former Panathinaikos defender Kostas Triantafyllopoulos brought him down in the box. On 4 February 2018, he opened the score in a frustrating 2–1 home loss against rivals AEK Athens stayed behind in the rally for the 2017–18 title. On 31 March 2018, he scored with a cool finish from an exquisite Leonardo Koutris pass in a 1–1 away draw against Levadiakos. On 16 April 2018, opened the score in an emphatic 5–1 home win against Kerkyra. On 29 April, he scored a brace in a 4–0 home win game against Panetolikos, struggling with PAOK's forward Aleksandar Prijović for the title of top scorer. Ansarifard's contract was cancelled by Olympiacos after their 2017–18 season.

=== Nottingham Forest ===
On 3 November 2018, it was announced that Ansarifard had signed for Nottingham Forest in the Sky Bet Championship after delays obtaining a work permit. The Iranian international penned a one-and-a-half-year contract at the City Ground. He made his debut for the club coming on as a substitute in a 1–0 win over Sheffield United on 3 November. Ansarifard scored his first goal in a 3–0 win at home to Hull City, also assisting the first goal.

=== Al-Sailiya ===
On 12 July 2019, Ansarifard made the move to Al-Sailiya in the Qatar Stars League.

=== AEK Athens ===
On 25 August 2020, Ansarifard signed a three-year contract with Greek Super League club AEK Athens. On 1 October 2020, he scored the winning goal in the 90+4 minute, to achieve a 2–1 win against Wolfsburg in the 2020–21 UEFA Europa League play-off round.

On 22 November 2020, Ansarifard came in as a substitute and helped to a 4–1 home win against AEL. The following week, he scored in a 2–1 away win against Asteras Tripolis. On 13 December 2020, he scored a brace in a dramatic 4–3 away win against Apollon Smyrnis. On 11 January 2021, he scored the only goal in a 1–0 away win against Lamia.

On 8 March 2021, he scored a brace in a 2–0 home win against Apollon Smyrnis. On 11 April 2021, he scored with a penalty in a 3–1 away win against Aris Thessaloniki. On 22 July 2021, he opened the score for the club in the UEFA Europa Conference League, but AEK faced a frustrated away loss with 2–1 against FK Velež Mostar. On 24 October 2021, he opened the score in a 3–1 away win against Volos.

=== Omonia ===
On 30 August 2022, Ansarifard joined Cypriot First Division club Omonia on a two-year contract, with the option of an additional year. On 18 September, he scored his first goal for the club in a 4–0 home win against Paralimni.

On 6 October, he opened the score in an eventual 2–3 home defeat to Manchester United in the Europa League. This made Ansarifard, Omonia's 100th player to score in a European competition.

Ansarifard scored two goals against APOEL in the quarter finals of the 2022–23 Cypriot Cup, helping his team advance 3–2 on aggregate. On 24 May 2023, he scored the winning goal in the final against AEL Limassol to win Omonia their 16th domestic cup.

=== Aris ===
In late January 2024, Ansarifard signed for Greek side Aris.

== International career ==
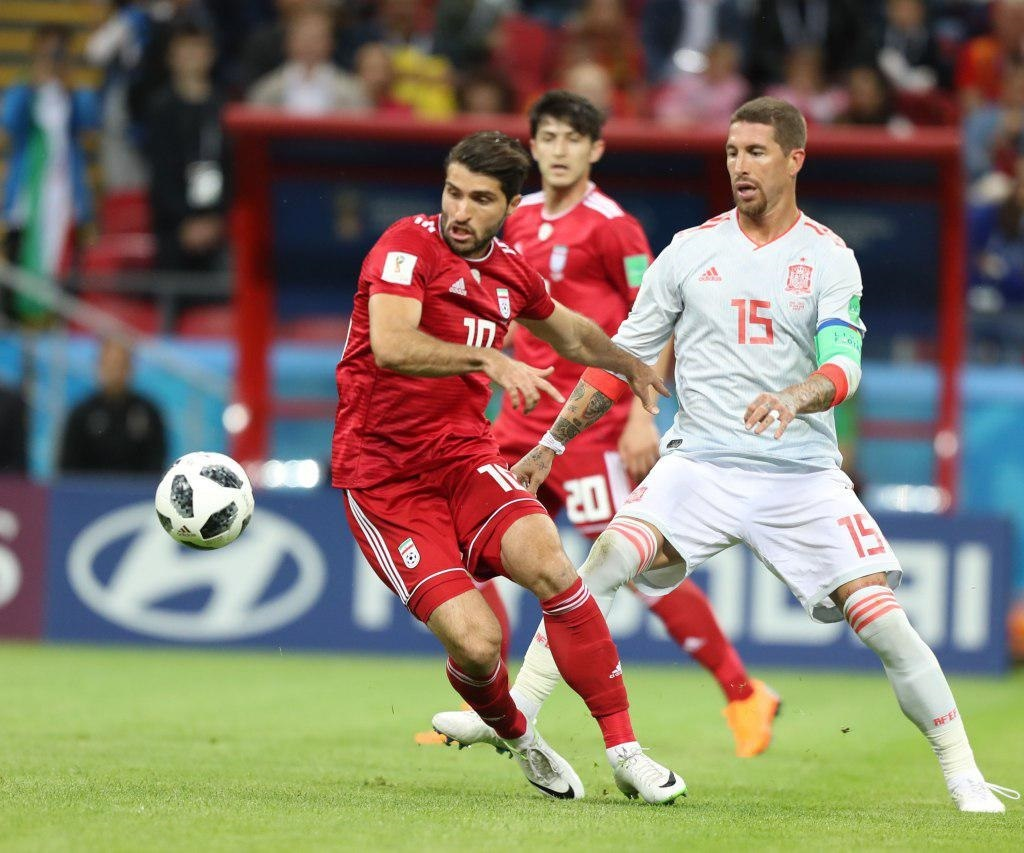
Ansarifard playing for Iran in 2018

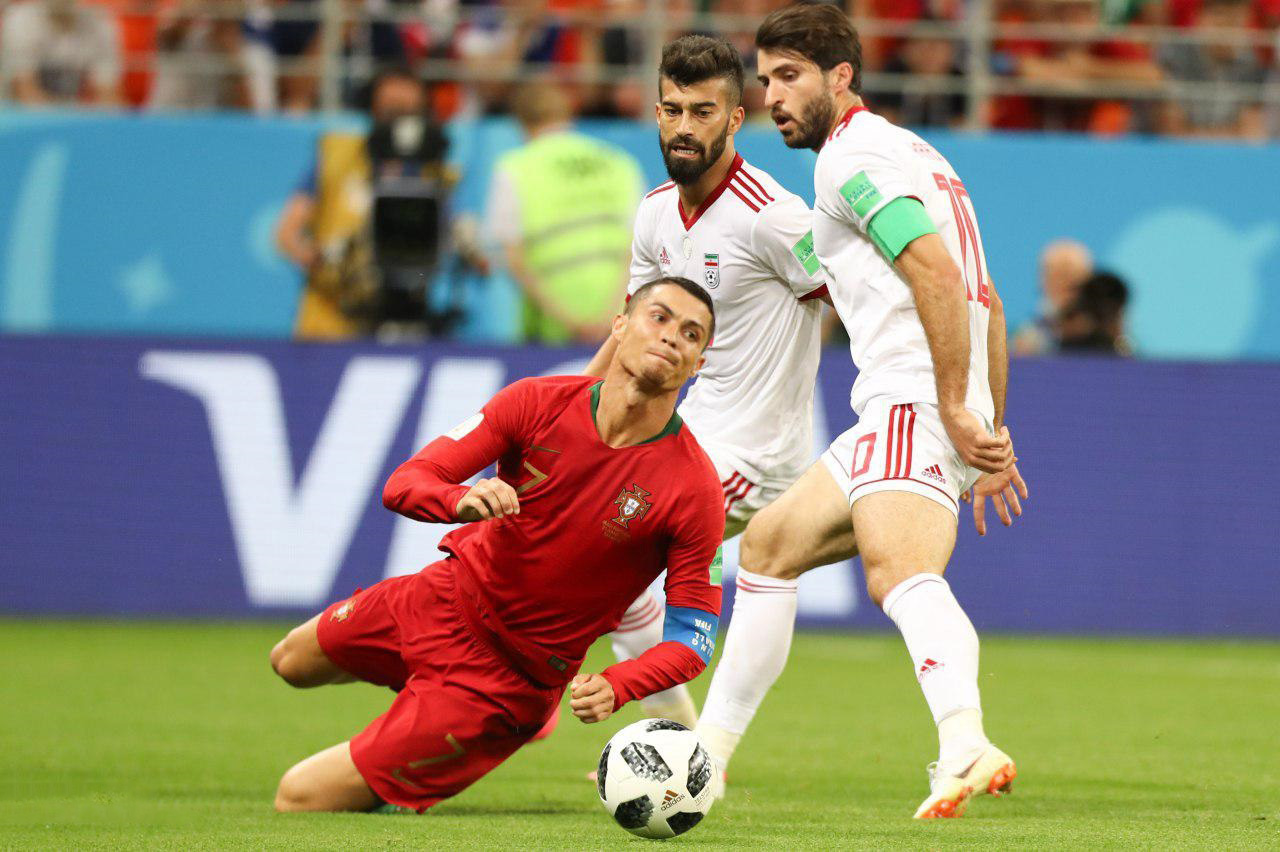
Ansarifard captaining Iran, against Portugal in the 2018 FIFA World Cup

Ansarifard was Invited to the Iran U17 national team in 2005. In 2006 AFC U-17 Championship, he wore number 14 and was a benchwarmer. Ansarifard played as a substitute in two matches against Tajikistan and Yemen.

Ansarifard made his debut for the senior Iran national team in a match against Iceland in November 2009 under Afshin Ghotbi and scored his first international goal and the only goal of the game. He was given the number 10 previously worn by Ali Daei and scored on 15 January 2011 his third international goal against North Korea, so Ansarifard became Iran's youngest ever goalscorer in the AFC Asian Cup. In 2014 FIFA World Cup qualification, Ansarifard scored a double against Maldives at Azadi Stadium. He came on as a late substitute against Uzbekistan in the World Cup qualifiers and assisted with a pass for Mohammad Reza Khalatbari as a 94th-minute winner. On 1 June 2014, he was called into Iran's 2014 FIFA World Cup squad by Carlos Queiroz. He played his first World Cup match against Bosnia and Herzegovina, coming on as a substitute for Ashkan Dejagah in the 68th minute. He was called into Iran's 2015 AFC Asian Cup squad on 30 December 2014 by Carlos Queiroz. He provided an assist to Sardar Azmoun in their Asian Cup preparation match against Iraq. In May 2018 he was named in Iran's preliminary squad for the 2018 World Cup in Russia. He scored a penalty against Portugal with a 1–1 as the result.

In December 2018, he was called up for the 2019 AFC Asian Cup in the United Arab Emirates. In the quarter-final match against China, he scored the third goal in the stoppage time in a 3–0 victory.

On 10 October 2019, he scored four goals in a historic 14–0 victory over Cambodia during the 2022 FIFA World Cup qualification second round. In November 2022, he was named in the 25-man squad for the 2022 FIFA World Cup in Qatar.

In January 2024, he was included in the 26-man squad for the 2023 AFC Asian Cup. In the first group stage match against Palestine, he scored the opening goal in a 4–1 victory, which also marked his 100th match with the national team.

== Style of play ==
He has been compared to Ali Daei and German forward Thomas Müller. He is a center forward with energy and impressively in both air and ground. He played as a right winger in first season for Saipa but in next seasons returned to his main position.

== Personal life ==
Ansarifard was born in Ardabil, the last child of an Iranian Azerbaijani family and has three brothers and three sisters. He studied physical education at Islamic Azad University Central Tehran Branch.

In August 2018, Ansarifard married Greek businesswoman Alexandra Sofia Kalouli at a ceremony held in Vouliagmeni. Kalouli is the managing director of the Innovative Maritime Emotional Intelligence Center (IMEQ Center), a mental health research center with offices in Cyprus and Greece.

On 4 January 2026, Ansarifard publicly supported the 2025–2026 Iranian protests on his Instagram, stating: "People who have proven themselves in all circumstances deserve a life far better than the current conditions."

== Career statistics ==
=== Club ===
As of match played 19 May 2024

Appearances and goals by club, season and competition
Club	Season	League			National cup (Note: Includes Iranian Hazfi Cup, Copa del Rey, Greek Football Cup, Cypriot Cup)		Continental		Other		Total	
Club	Season	Division	Apps	Goals	Apps	Goals	Apps	Goals	Apps	Goals	Apps	Goals
Saipa	2007–08	Persian Gulf Pro League	18	1	0	0	5 (Note: Appearances in AFC Champions League)	1	—		23	2
Saipa	2008–09	Persian Gulf Pro League	14	1	1	0	—		—		15	1
Saipa	2009–10	Persian Gulf Pro League	31	13	1	0	—		—		32	13
Saipa	2010–11	Persian Gulf Pro League	29	19	1	0	—		—		30	19
Saipa	2011–12	Persian Gulf Pro League	31	21	0	0	—		—		31	21
Saipa	Total		123	55	3	0	5	1	—		131	56
Persepolis	2012–13	Iran Pro League	31	8	5	4	—		—		36	12
Tractor	2013–14	Iran Pro League	28	14	4	2	4	1	—		36	17
Osasuna	2014–15	Segunda División	16	0	1	0	—		—		17	0
Panionios	2015–16	Super League Greece	27	8	6	1	—		3 (Note: Appearances in Super League Greece play-offs)	1	36	10
Panionios	2016–17	Super League Greece	14	5	1	0	—		—		15	5
Panionios	Total		41	13	7	1	—		3	1	51	15
Olympiacos	2016–17	Super League Greece	9	1	6	1	4 (Note: Appearances in UEFA Europa League)	2	—		19	4
Olympiacos	2017–18	Super League Greece	25	17	2	1	0	0	—		27	18
Olympiacos	2018–19	Super League Greece	0	0	0	0	2	0	—		2	0
Olympiacos	Total		34	18	8	2	6	2	—		48	22
Nottingham Forest	2018–19	Championship	12	2	0	0	—		—		12	2
Al-Sailiya	2019–20	Qatar Stars League	20	6	0	0	1	0	—		21	6
AEK Athens	2020–21	Super League Greece	34	13	5	0	8	1	—		47	14
AEK Athens	2021–22	Super League Greece	29	4	4	1	2 (Note: Appearances in UEFA Europa Conference League)	1	—		35	6
AEK Athens	Total		63	17	9	1	10	2	—		82	20
Omonia	2022–23	Cypriot First Division	31	4	5	3	5	1	—		41	8
Omonia	2023–24	Cypriot First Division	15	2	0	0	4	0	1 (Note: Appearance in Cypriot Super Cup)	0	20	2
Aris	2023–24	Super League Greece	12	1	2	0	0	0	–		14	1
Career total			426	140	44	13	35	7	4	1	509	161

=== International ===
As of match played 3 February 2024

Appearances and goals by national team and year
National team	Year	Apps	Goals
Iran	2009	6	2
Iran	2010	8	0
Iran	2011	10	5
Iran	2012	8	1
Iran	2013	3	0
Iran	2014	6	2
Iran	2015	4	1
Iran	2016	7	4
Iran	2017	4	2
Iran	2018	13	3
Iran	2019	12	6
Iran	2020	1	0
Iran	2021	8	3
Iran	2022	6	0
Iran	2023	2	0
Iran	2024	6	1
Total		104	30

As of match played 14 January 2024
Scores and results list Iran's goal tally first, score column indicates score after each Ansarifard goal.

List of international goals scored by Karim Ansarifard
No.	Date	Venue	Cap	Opponent	Score	Result	Competition
1	10 November 2009	Azadi Stadium, Tehran, Iran	2	Iceland	1–0	1–0	Friendly
2	30 December 2009	Suheim Bin Hamad Stadium, Doha, Qatar	6	Mali	1–0	1–2	Friendly
3	15 January 2011	Suheim Bin Hamad Stadium, Doha, Qatar	17	North Korea	1–0	1–0	2011 AFC Asian Cup
4	23 July 2011	Azadi Stadium, Tehran, Iran	20	Maldives	1–0	4–0	2014 FIFA World Cup qualification
5	23 July 2011	Azadi Stadium, Tehran, Iran	20	Maldives	2–0	4–0	2014 FIFA World Cup qualification
6	5 October 2011	Azadi Stadium, Tehran, Iran	23	Palestine	2–0	7–0	Friendly
7	11 October 2011	Azadi Stadium, Tehran, Iran	24	Bahrain	5–0	6–0	2014 FIFA World Cup qualification
8	18 April 2012	Azadi Stadium, Tehran, Iran	28	Mauritania	2–0	2–0	Friendly
9	3 March 2014	Enghelab Stadium, Karaj, Iran	39	Kuwait	3–2	3–2	2015 AFC Asian Cup qualification
10	30 May 2014	Stadion Hartberg, Hartberg, Austria	42	Angola	1–1	1–1	Friendly
11	17 November 2015	Guam National Football Stadium, Tamuning, Guam	48	Guam	5–0	6–0	2018 FIFA World Cup qualification
12	7 June 2016	Azadi Stadium, Tehran, Iran	52	Kyrgyzstan	4–0	6–0	Friendly
13	7 June 2016	Azadi Stadium, Tehran, Iran	52	Kyrgyzstan	6–0	6–0	Friendly
14	10 November 2016	Shah Alam Stadium, Shah Alam, Malaysia	54	Papua New Guinea	4–1	8–1	Friendly
15	10 November 2016	Shah Alam Stadium, Shah Alam, Malaysia	54	Papua New Guinea	8–1	8–1	Friendly
16	5 October 2017	Azadi Stadium, Tehran, Iran	58	Togo	1–0	2–0	Friendly
17	5 October 2017	Azadi Stadium, Tehran, Iran	58	Togo	2–0	2–0	Friendly
18	8 June 2018	Spartak Training Ground, Moscow, Russia	64	Lithuania	1–0	1–0	Friendly
19	25 June 2018	Mordovia Arena, Saransk, Russia	67	Portugal	1–1	1–1	2018 FIFA World Cup
20	15 November 2018	Azadi Stadium, Tehran, Iran	70	Trinidad and Tobago	1–0	1–0	Friendly
21	24 January 2019	Mohammed bin Zayed Stadium, Abu Dhabi, United Arab Emirates	75	China	3–0	3–0	2019 AFC Asian Cup
22	10 September 2019	Hong Kong Stadium, Hong Kong	79	Hong Kong	2–0	2–0	2022 FIFA World Cup qualification
23	10 October 2019	Azadi Stadium, Tehran, Iran	80	Cambodia	6–0	14–0	2022 FIFA World Cup qualification
24	10 October 2019	Azadi Stadium, Tehran, Iran	80	Cambodia	8–0	14–0	2022 FIFA World Cup qualification
25	10 October 2019	Azadi Stadium, Tehran, Iran	80	Cambodia	10–0	14–0	2022 FIFA World Cup qualification
26	10 October 2019	Azadi Stadium, Tehran, Iran	80	Cambodia	14–0	14–0	2022 FIFA World Cup qualification
27	30 March 2021	Azadi Stadium, Tehran, Iran	83	Syria	1–0	3–0	Friendly
28	3 June 2021	Al Muharraq Stadium, Arad, Bahrain	84	Hong Kong	3–0	3–1	2022 FIFA World Cup qualification
29	11 June 2021	Bahrain National Stadium, Riffa, Bahrain	85	Cambodia	7–0	10–0	2022 FIFA World Cup qualification
30	14 January 2024	Education City Stadium, Al Rayyan, Qatar	101	Palestine	1–0	4–1	2023 AFC Asian Cup

== Honours ==
Tractor

- Hazfi Cup: 2013–14

Olympiacos

- Super League Greece: 2016–17

Omonia

- Cypriot Cup: 2022–23

Individual

- Persian Gulf Pro League Player of the Month: August 2011
- Persian Gulf Pro League Top scorer: 2011–12 (21 goals), 2013–14 (14 goals)
- Persian Gulf Pro League Striker of the Year: 2011–12, 2013–14
- Persian Gulf Pro League Team of the Season: 2011–12, 2013–14
- Super League Greece Team of the Season: 2017–18

== See also ==
- List of men's footballers with 100 or more international caps
- Iranians in Spain
