= 2012–13 Persepolis F.C. season =

Persepolis
2012–13 season
- Chairman: Mohammad Rouyanian
- Manager: Manuel José (until 10 December 2012); Yahya Golmohammadi (from 10 December 2012)
- Stadium: Azadi Stadium
- Persian Gulf Cup: 7th
- Hazfi Cup: Runners-up
- Top goalscorer: League: Karim Ansarifard (8); All: Karim Ansarifard (12)
- Highest home attendance: 100,000 v Esteghlal (29 August 2012)
- Lowest home attendance: 0 (spectator ban) v Fajr Sepasi (23 July 2012) v Aluminium Hormozgan (27 September 2012)
- Average home league attendance: 20,099
Home colours	Away colours	Third colours

The 2012–13 season was Persepolis's 12th season in the Pro League, and their 30th consecutive season in the top division of Iranian Football. They competed in the Hazfi Cup. Persepolis saw a change in managerial role in the beginning of the season when Mustafa Denizli announced via an open letter to the fans that he couldn't cooperate with Perspolis anymore due to his personal problems and was replaced with former Al Ahly boss Manuel José. Persepolis is captained by Mehdi Mahdavikia.

== Key events ==
- 29 May: The Club introduces 10 of 2012–13 Seasons players, it means that they release professional players Asmir Avdukić, Misagh Memarzadeh, Hossein Hooshyar, Alireza Mohammad, Mojtaba Shiri, Mohammad Nosrati, Maziar Zare, Hossein Badamaki, Sheys Rezaei, Saman Aghazamani, Javad Kazemian, Ebrahim Shakouri, Vahid Hashemian, Mamadou Tall & Mehrdad Oladi. After few days Kazemian & Aghazamani had been returned to first team.
- 30 May: Mohammad Ghazi joins The Club. This left footed striker signed two-years contract until the end of 2013–14 season.
- 2 June:Mohammad Reza Khanzadeh & Afshin Esmaeilzadeh joins The Club as u-21 players. Both of them had been played for National youth teams.
- 4 June: Mehrdad Pouladi signed a two-years contract after Team Melli's camp.
- 5 June: After releasing all of their goalkeepers, the club signed Shahab Gordan for a season as a free deal .
- 7 June: Hossein Mahini, Jalal Hosseini & Mohsen Bengar joins The Club. Mahini signed two-year contract while Hosseini & Bengar signing one-year contracts.
- 22 June: Mustafa Denizli leave the reds. the Turkish coach terminate his contract because of personal problems.
- 26 June: Karim Ansarifard, the top scorer of previous season joins The Club with three-years contract. Successor of The Legend, Ali Daei, will wear #9 jersey.
- 30 June: Brazilian midfielder Roberto Sousa joins The Club after success in medical tests. Maritimo & Celta de Vigo previous Defensive midfielder signed two-years contract.
- 3 July: Former Al Ahly coach Manuel José replaced Mustafa Denizli.
- 4 July: Ali Karimi & Mehdi Mahdavikia extends their contract for another year. Mahdavikia announces that it will his last season of playing football.
- 12 July: Eamon Zayed extend his contract for another year.
- 19 July: Persepolis started the league with a 1–0 win at Sanat Naft with a goal from Javad Kazemian.
- 13 September: 45 days after injury, Roberto Sousa & The Club reached agreement to terminate the contract.
- 31 October: Persepolis defeated Paykan 6–0 with a hat-trick from Karim Ansarifard, revive the famous 6–0 win against the rival Eteghlal in 1973 derby.
- 3 December: Persepolis finished the first half of the league in 12th place, same with last season's final rank.
- 7 December: Manuel José was sacked as the manager of the club and was replaced by his assistant Yahya Golmohammadi, a former player and captain of the team.
- 19 December: Golmohammadi celebrated his first game as the manager of the Persepolis with a 6–0 win against Malavan in the first match of the season's Hazfi Cup campaign.
- 30 December: Gholamreza Rezaei scored the fastest goal in the history of Iran Pro League and also the fastest in 2012 in a 2–0 win over Fajr Sepasi.
- 14 March: Mehdi Mahdavikia announced his retirement before the match against Mes Kerman. Former Team Melli's captain also announce that if Persepolis reach the Hazfi Cups final, this match will be his farewell match.

== Squad ==
=== First team squad ===
No.	Name	Age	Nationality	Position (s)	Since	App	Goals	Assist	Ends	Previous club	Transfer fee	Notes
Goalkeepers
1	Reza Mohammadi	26	(Iran)	GK	2013 (W)	1	0	0	2013	(Iran) Sepahan	Free	
21	Amir Abedzadeh	19	(Iran)	GK	2012	0	0	0	2015	(United States) L.A Blues	€100,000	U-21 Players
28	Masoud Dastani	20	(Iran)	GK	2010	0	0	0	2013	Youth Team		U-21 Players
40	Nilson Corrêa	37	(Brazil)	GK	2012	33	0	0	2013	(Portugal) Guimarães	Free	Second nationality: Burkina Faso
Defenders
4	Jalal Hosseini	30	(Iran)	CB / RB	2012	36	1	0	2013	(Iran) Sepahan	Free	
6	Mohsen Bengar	33	(Iran)	CB	2012	27	0	1	2013	(Iran) Sepahan	Free	
13	Hossein Mahini	26	(Iran)	RB / LB / RM	2012	35	2	5	2014	(Iran) Zob Ahan	Free	
15	Roozbeh Cheshmi	19	(Iran)	CB / LB /DM	2013 (W)	0	0	0	2015	Youth Team		U-21 Players
16	Mehrdad Pouladi	25	(Iran)	LB / LM / CM	2012 (W)	32	1	1	2014	(Iran) Mes	Free	
19	Saeid Ghadami	20	(Iran)	LB / LM	2011	0	0	0	2014	(Iran) Foolad	Free	U-21 Players
20	Alireza Noormohammadi	31	(Iran)	CB / LB	2010	95	6	1	2013	(Iran) Rah Ahan	Free	
30	Mohammad Reza Khanzadeh	20	(Iran)	RB / CB / LB	2012	18	0	2	2015	(Iran) Rah Ahan	Free	U-23 Players
35	Hossein Kanaani	18	(Iran)	CB / RB	2012 (W)	1	0	0	2015	Youth Team		U-21 Players
Midfielders
2	Mehdi Mahdavikia	35	(Iran)	RM / RB / DM	2012 (W)	102	27	7	2013	(Iran) Damash	€80,000	Captain
8	Ali Karimi	34	(Iran)	AM / SS / RM	2011	140	38	16	2013	(Germany) Schalke 04	Free	Vice Captain
14	Mohammad Nouri	29	(Iran)	AM / CM	2010	117	32	15	2013	(Iran) Saba Qom	Free	
17	Vlatko Grozdanoski	29	(North Macedonia)	CM / RM / AM	2013 (W)	12	2	1	2013	(China) Liaoning Whowin	Free	
18	Meysam Naghizadeh	26	(Iran)	DM	2012	23	2	0	2015	(Iran) Machine Sazi	Free	
22	Mehrzad Madanchi	29	(Iran)	LM / LW	2012	70	20	0	2015	(United Arab Emirates) Al-Shaab	Free	
23	Amir Hossein Feshangchi	25	(Iran)	LM / LB / LW	2010	97	10	7	2015	(Iran) Saba Qom	Free	Originally from Youth Team
29	Marko Perović	28	(Serbia)	LM / LW	2013 (W)	16	2	0	2013	(Serbia) Red Star	Free	
31	Afshin Esmaeilzadeh	20	(Iran)	AM / RM	2012	1	0	0	2015	Youth Team		U-21 Players
33	Reza Haghighi	23	(Iran)	DM / CM	2013 (W)	19	2	1	2015	(Iran) Fajr Sepasi	€200,000	
39	Adel Kolahkaj	27	(Iran)	DM / CM	2013 (W)	40	1	0	2013	(Iran) Sepahan	Free	
Forwards
9	Karim Ansarifard	22	(Iran)	CF	2012	36	12	5	2015	(Iran) Saipa	Free	U-23 Players
10	Gholamreza Rezaei	28	(Iran)	RW / LW / ST	2010	90	13	20	2014	(Iran) Foolad	Free	
11	Mohammad Ghazi	28	(Iran)	CF / LW / SS	2012	24	3	1	2014	(Iran) Zob Ahan	Free	
24	Hadi Norouzi	27	(Iran)	SS / RW / LW / ST	2008	151	30	18	2014	(Iran) Damash	Free	Originally from Youth Team; 3rd Captain
27	Rouhollah Seifollahi	22	(Iran)	LW / ST	2011 (W)	7	0	0	2015	Youth Team		U-23 Players
32	Farshad Ahmadzadeh	20	(Iran)	SS / LW / ST / AM	2012	2	0	0	2015	Youth Team		U-21 Players
Players transferred during the season
1	Shahab Gordan	28	(Iran)	GK	2012	5	0	0	Transferred to Sepahan			
5	Saman Aghazamani	22	(Iran)	DM / RB	2009	61	0	0	Transferred to Rah Ahan			
7	Hamidreza Aliasgari	22	(Iran)	RW / RM / RB / LW / LM / LB	2007	98	6	7	On loan to Rah Ahan			
12	Éamon Zayed	29	(Republic of Ireland)	CF	2011 (W)	21	12	1	Transferred to Aluminium Hormozgan			
15	Roberto Sousa	27	(Brazil)	DM / CM	2012	3	0	0	Contract Terminated			
17	Javad Kazemian	31	(Iran)	RW / LW / ST	2011	156	37	9	Transferred to Tractor Sazi			

Apps and goals updated as of 10 May 2013
For more on the reserve and academy squads, see Persepolis Novin, Persepolis Academy & Persepolis Qaem Shahr.
Source: fc-perspolis.com, FFIRI.IR

=== Iran Pro League squad ===
Updated 17 July 2012.

Note: Flags indicate national team as defined under FIFA eligibility rules; some limited exceptions apply. Players may hold more than one non-FIFA nationality.

No.	Pos.	Nation	Player
1	GK	IRI	Reza Mohammadi
2	MF	IRI	Mehdi Mahdavikia (Captain)
4	DF	IRI	Jalal Hosseini
6	DF	IRI	Mohsen Bengar
8	MF	IRI	Ali Karimi (Vice-Captain)
9	FW	IRI	Karim Ansarifard
10	FW	IRI	Gholamreza Rezaei
11	FW	IRI	Mohammad Ghazi
13	DF	IRI	Hossein Mahini
14	MF	IRI	Mohammad Nouri (4th Captain)
15	DF	IRI	Roozbeh Cheshmi
16	MF	IRI	Mehrdad Pouladi
17	MF	MKD	Vlatko Grozdanoski
18	MF	IRI	Meysam Naghizadeh
19	MF	IRI	Saeid Ghadami
20	DF	IRI	Alireza Noormohammadi

No.	Pos.	Nation	Player
21	GK	IRI	Amir Abedzadeh
22	MF	IRI	Mehrzad Madanchi
23	MF	IRI	Amir Hossein Feshangchi
24	FW	IRI	Hadi Norouzi (3rd Captain)
27	FW	IRI	Rouhollah Seifollahi
28	GK	IRI	Masoud Dastani
29	MF	SRB	Marko Perović
30	DF	IRI	Mohammad Reza Khanzadeh
31	MF	IRI	Afshin Esmaeilzadeh
32	MF	IRI	Farshad Ahmadzadeh
33	MF	IRI	Reza Haghighi
35	DF	IRI	Hossein Kanaani
39	MF	IRI	Adel Kolahkaj
40	GK	BRA	Nilson Corrêa

==== On loan ====
Note: Flags indicate national team as defined under FIFA eligibility rules; some limited exceptions apply. Players may hold more than one non-FIFA nationality.

No.	Pos.	Nation	Player
7	MF	IRI	Hamidreza Aliasgari (at Rah Ahan until 10 May 2013)

== Transfers ==
=== Summer ===
In: Note: Flags indicate national team as defined under FIFA eligibility rules; some limited exceptions apply. Players may hold more than one non-FIFA nationality.

No.	Pos.	Nation	Player
1	GK	IRI	Shahab Gordan (from Zob Ahan)
16	DF	IRI	Mehrdad Pouladi (from Mes Kerman)
4	DF	IRI	Jalal Hosseini (from Sepahan)
6	DF	IRI	Mohsen Bengar (from Sepahan)
11	FW	IRI	Mohammad Ghazi (from Zob Ahan)
13	DF	IRI	Hossein Mahini (from Zob Ahan)
30	DF	IRI	Mohammad Reza Khanzadeh (from Rah Ahan)
31	MF	IRI	Afshin Esmaeilzadeh (from Damash Gilan)
9	FW	IRI	Karim Ansarifard (from Saipa)
15	MF	BRA	Roberto Sousa (from (Portugal) C.S. Marítimo)
21	GK	IRI	Amir Abedzadeh (from (United States) Los Angeles Blues)
22	MF	IRI	Mehrzad Madanchi (from (United Arab Emirates) Al-Shaab)
40	GK	BRA	Nilson Corrêa (from (Portugal) Guimarães)
32	MF	IRI	Farshad Ahmadzadeh (from Parseh Tehran)
18	MF	IRI	Meysam Naghizadeh (from Machine Sazi)
52	MF	KOR	Kwon Jun (from (Indonesia) PSM Makassar)

Out: Note: Flags indicate national team as defined under FIFA eligibility rules; some limited exceptions apply. Players may hold more than one non-FIFA nationality.

No.	Pos.	Nation	Player
1	GK	BIH	Asmir Avdukić (loan return to (Bosnia and Herzegovina) Borac Banja Luka)
22	GK	IRI	Misagh Memarzadeh (Released)
38	GK	IRI	Hossein Hooshyar (to Aboomoslem)
2	DF	IRI	Alireza Mohammad (to Gahar)
4	DF	IRI	Mojtaba Shiri (to Pas Hamedan)
6	DF	IRI	Mohammad Nosrati (to Tractor Sazi)
13	DF	IRI	Sheys Rezaei (to Shahrdari Tabriz)
18	DF	IRI	Ebrahim Shakouri (to Saipa)
30	DF	BFA	Mamadou Tall (Released)
9	MF	IRI	Maziar Zare (to Malavan)
11	MF	IRI	Hossein Badamaki (to Malavan)
40	MF	IRI	Mohammad Mehdi Elhaei (to Sanat Naft)
21	FW	IRI	Vahid Hashemian (Retired)
33	FW	IRI	Mehrdad Oladi (to Malavan)

=== Winter ===
In: Note: Flags indicate national team as defined under FIFA eligibility rules; some limited exceptions apply. Players may hold more than one non-FIFA nationality.

No.	Pos.	Nation	Player
33	MF	IRI	Reza Haghighi (from Fajr Sepasi)
39	MF	IRI	Adel Kolahkaj (from Sepahan)
29	MF	SRB	Marko Perović (from (Serbia) Red Star Belgrade)
1	GK	IRI	Reza Mohammadi (from Sepahan)
17	MF	MKD	Vlatko Grozdanoski (from (China) Liaoning)
15	DF	IRI	Roozbeh Cheshmi (from Moghavemat Tehran)

Out: Note: Flags indicate national team as defined under FIFA eligibility rules; some limited exceptions apply. Players may hold more than one non-FIFA nationality.

No.	Pos.	Nation	Player
15	MF	BRA	Roberto Sousa (to (Portugal) C.S. Marítimo)
12	FW	EIR	Éamon Zayed (to Aluminium Hormozgan)
52	MF	KOR	Kwon Jun (to (Indonesia) Persepam)
5	MF	IRI	Saman Aghazamani (to Rah Ahan)
17	FW	IRI	Javad Kazemian (to Tractor Sazi)
7	MF	IRI	Hamidreza Aliasgari (On Loan at Rah Ahan)
1	GK	IRI	Shahab Gordan (to Sepahan)

== Competitions ==
=== Overview ===
Competition	Started round	Current position / round	Final position / round	First match	Last match
2012–13 Persian Gulf Cup	—	—	7th	19 July 2012	10 May 2013
2012–13 Hazfi Cup	Round of 32	—	Runners-up	17 December 2012	5 May 2013

Source: Competitions

=== Iran Pro League ===
==== Standings ====
Pos	Team	Pld	W	D	L	GF	GA	GD	Pts
5	Naft Tehran	34	14	13	7	42	29	+13	55
6	Mes Kerman	34	12	15	7	33	26	+7	51
7	Persepolis	34	12	14	8	41	31	+10	50
8	Rah Ahan	34	12	12	10	49	39	+10	48
9	Saba Qom	34	10	15	9	37	33	+4	45

Updated to match(es) played on 10 May 2013. Source: IPL stats.com
Rules for classification: 1) points; 2) goal difference; 3) number of goals scored.

==== Results summary ====
Overall								Home						Away					
Pld	W	D	L	GF	GA	GD	Pts	W	D	L	GF	GA	GD	W	D	L	GF	GA	GD
34	12	14	8	41	31	+10	50	9	5	3	28	15	+13	3	9	5	13	16	−3

Last updated: 10 May 2013.
Source: Ipl Stats

==== Results by round ====
Round	1	2	3	4	5	6	7	8	9	10	11	12	13	14	15	16	17	18	19	20	21	22	23	24	25	26	27	28	29	30	31	32	33	34
Ground	A	H	A	H	A	H	A	H	A	H	A	H	A	H	H	A	H	H	A	H	A	H	H	H	H	H	A	H	H	H	H	A	H	A
Result	W	L	D	L	L	D	D	D	L	W	D	W	L	W	W	D	L	D	W	W	D	W	D	D	D	W	D	W	L	D	W	D	W	L
Position	3	8	10	12	16	15	16	14	15	13	13	11	14	11	10	11	12	13	10	12	9	11	11	11	6	6	6	6	6	6	6	6	6	7

Updated to match(es) played on 10 May 2013. Source: "Ipl".
A = Away; H = Home; W = Win; D = Draw; L = Loss

==== Matches ====
Win Draw Loss Postponed

Date Round	Home	Score	Away	Location

19 July 2012 1	Sanat Naft	0–1	Persepolis	Abadan
20:45 UTC+04:30	M. Elhaei (yellow card) 43'; S. Koohnavard (yellow card) 53'; S. Hallafi (yellow card) 70'	Summary; Live TV: IRIB TV3 / Jame Jam 2	M. Ghazi (yellow card) 32'; J. Kazemian 89' (yellow card) 90'; A. Karimi (yellow card) 90+4'	Stadium: Takhti Stadium; Attendance: 15,000; Referee: Mohsen Ghahremani

23 July 2012 2	Persepolis	2–3	Fajr Sepasi	Tehran
22:30 UTC+04:30	A. Feshangchi 15'; M. Ghazi 90+3'; J. Hosseini (yellow card)	Summary; Live TV: IRIB TV3 / Jame Jam 2	A. Mohammad Rezaei 53'; R. Haghighi 76' (pen.) (yellow card) 88'; M. Nazari (yellow card) 89' (goal) 90+1'	Stadium: Azadi Stadium; Attendance: - Referee: Saeid Bakhshizadeh

30 July 2012 3	Gahar	1–1	Persepolis	Tehran
22:30 UTC+04:30	M. Zarei 82'; H. Rekabi (red card) 89'	Summary; Live TV: IRIB TV3 / Jame Jam 2	K. Ansarifard 15'; A. Karimi (yellow card) 42'; M. Pouladi (yellow card) 74' (yellow-red card) 78'	Stadium: Azadi Stadium; Attendance: 65,000; Referee: Touraj Haghverdi
Note: Gahar hosted Persepolis at Azadi stadium because of problems in their home stadium.

5 August 2012 4	Persepolis	0–2	Saba Qom	Tehran
22:30 UTC+04:30	M. Bengar (yellow card) 52'; J. Hosseini (yellow card) 90+1'	Summary; Live TV: IRIB TV3 / Jame Jam 2	S. Bayat (yellow card) 72'; H. Lak (yellow card) 74'; M. Soleiman Fallah 75' (yellow card) 76'; A. Sadeghi 89' (pen.)	Stadium: Azadi Stadium; Attendance: 67,678; Referee: Mohsen Torki

19 August 2012 5	Damash	1–0	Persepolis	Rasht
19:10 UTC+04:30	A. Nazifkar (yellow card) 11'; R. Boroush (yellow card) 19' (yellow-red card) 46'; H. Ebrahimi 68'; M. Farahani (yellow card) 84'	Summary; Live TV: IRIB TV3 / Jame Jam 2	Gh. Rezaei (yellow card) 28'	Stadium: Azodi Stadium; Attendance: 20,000; Referee: Ahmad Salehi

24 August 2012 6	Persepolis	0–0	Esteghlal	Tehran
18:00 UTC+04:30	M. Pouladi (yellow card) 17'; A. Feshangchi (yellow card) 90+5'	Summary; Live TV: IRIB TV3 / Jame Jam 2	S. Akbarpour (yellow card) 24'; H. Omranzadeh (yellow card) 37'	Stadium: Azadi Stadium; Attendance: 100,000; Referee: Mohsen Torki

29 August 2012 7	Foolad	1–1	Persepolis	Ahvaz
19:00 UTC+04:30	A. Kalantari 89'	Summary; Live TV: IRIB TV3 / Jame Jam 2	M. Ghazi 74'; E. Zayed (yellow card) 86'	Stadium: Ghadir Stadium; Attendance: 10,000; Referee: Alireza Faghani

16 September 2012 8	Persepolis	0–0	Naft Tehran	Tehran
19:45 UTC+04:30		Summary; Live TV: IRIB TV3 / Jame Jam 2	A. Alenemeh (yellow card) 58'; V. Hamdinejad (yellow card) 67'; I. Mousavi (yellow card) 73'	Stadium: Azadi Stadium; Attendance: 5,000; Referee: Mohsen Ghahremani

23 September 2012 9	Sepahan	2–0	Persepolis	Fuladshahr
18:30 UTC+04:30	R. Đalović (yellow card) 14'; M. Khalatbari (yellow card) 15'; A. Kolahkaj 52'; X. Sukaj 73'	Summary; Live TV: IRIB TV3 / Jame Jam 2	J. Kazemian (yellow card) 7'; M. Madanchi (yellow card) 35'; H. Norouzi (yellow card) 42'	Stadium: Foolad Shahr Stadium; Attendance: 7,000; Referee: Saeid Mozaffarizadeh

27 September 2012 10	Persepolis	1–0	Aluminium	Tehran
18:30 UTC+04:30	M. Mahdavikia 29'; M. Bengar (yellow card) 63'	Summary; Live TV: IRIB TV3 / Jame Jam 2	R. Nasehi (yellow card) 43'	Stadium: Azadi Stadium; Attendance: - Referee: Ahmad Salehi

2 October 2012 11	Saipa	0–0	Persepolis	Tehran
18:15 UTC+03:30	M. Ayubi (yellow card) 5'; R. Ahmadi (yellow card) 69'; M. Gholamnejad (yellow card)	Summary; Live TV: IRIB TV3 / Jame Jam 2	M. Nouri (yellow card) 21'; M. Pouladi (penalty missed); A. Noormohammadi (yellow card) 82'; K. Ansarifard (yellow card) 88'	Stadium: Azadi Stadium; Attendance: 15,000; Referee: Alireza Faghani

22 October 2012 12	Persepolis	2–0	Rah Ahan	Tehran
18:00 UTC+03:30	H. Norouzi 2'; J. Hosseini 16'; H. Mahini (yellow card) 45'; M. Pouladi (yellow card) 64'	Summary; Live TV: IRIB TV3 / Jame Jam 2		Stadium: Azadi Stadium; Attendance: 10,000; Referee: Mohsen Torki

26 October 2012 13	Mes Kerman	2–1	Persepolis	Kerman
15:00 UTC+03:30	Mostafa. Shojaei 16', 61'	Summary; Live TV: IRIB TV3 / Jame Jam 2	M. Mahdavikia 45'	Stadium: Shahid Bahonar Stadium; Attendance: 8,000; Referee: Yadollah Jahanbazi

31 October 2012 14	Persepolis	6–0	Paykan	Tehran
17:45 UTC+03:30	K. Ansarifard 36', 48', 57'; A. Noormohammadi 42' (yellow card); M. Nouri 63'; M. Ghazi 86'	Summary; Live TV: IRIB TV3 / Jame Jam 2	N. Ahmadi (yellow card) 27'	Stadium: Azadi Stadium; Attendance: 8,000; Referee: Saeid Mozaffarizadeh

19 November 2012 15	Persepolis	3–2	Zob Ahan	Tehran
17:30 UTC+03:30	Mahdavikia 45+1'; Mahdavikia (yellow card) 45+2'; Nouri 74'; Ansarifard 90+6' (yellow card) 57'; Hosseini (yellow card) 73'	Summary; Live TV: IRIB TV3 / Jame Jam 2	Sadeghian 5' (yellow card) 36'; Noormohammadi 18'; Abdollahpour (red card) 24'; Gh. Haddadifar (yellow card) 47'; Homami (red card) 52'; Salsali (yellow card) 85'; Božović (yellow card) 90+4'	Stadium: Azadi Stadium; Attendance: 10,000; Referee: Mohsen Torky

28 November 2012 16	Malavan	2–2	Persepolis	Bandar-e Anzali
15:15 UTC+03:30	M. Zare 5' (yellow card) 61'; H. Badamaki (yellow card) 24'; S. Yousefzadeh (yellow card) 34'; A. Ahi 62'	Summary; Live TV: IRIB TV3 / Jame Jam 2	H. Norouzi 50' (yellow card) 90'; A. Feshangchi 54'; M. Khanzadeh (yellow card) 56'; H. Mahini (yellow card) 75'; Gh. Rezaei (yellow card) 88'; M. Bengar (yellow card) 90'; K. Ansarifard (yellow card) 90+3'	Stadium: Takhti Stadium; Attendance: 10,000; Referee: Ahmad Salehi

3 December 2012 17	Persepolis	0–1	Tractor Sazi	Tehran
17:30 UTC+03:30	M. Mahdavikia (yellow card) 28'; S. Aghazamani (yellow card) 59'	Summary; Live TV: IRIB TV3 / Jame Jam 2	M. Asadi (yellow card) 50'; M. Nosrati (yellow card) 67'; M. Seyed-Salehi 77'	Stadium: Azadi Stadium; Attendance: 20,000; Referee: Saeid Mozaffarizadeh

25 December 2012 18	Persepolis	2–2	Sanat Naft	Tehran
17:30 UTC+03:30	A. Karimi 4'; M. Nouri 10'; M. Pouladi (yellow card) 18'	Summary; Live TV: IRIB TV3 / Jame Jam 2	R. Khaleghifar (yellow card) 21' (goal) 54'; H. Kaabi (yellow card) 59'; R. Arab 85' (yellow card) 90+2'	Stadium: Azadi Stadium; Attendance: 15,000; Referee: Hossein Zargar

30 December 2012 19	Fajr Sepasi	0–2	Persepolis	Shiraz
14:00 UTC+03:30	H. Karimi (yellow card) 71'	Summary; Live TV: IRIB TV3 / Jame Jam 2	Gh. Rezaei 1'; K. Ansarifard 26'	Stadium: Hafezieh Stadium; Attendance: 10,500; Referee: Mohsen Ghahremani

4 January 2013 20	Persepolis	Postponed	Gahar	Tehran
--:--				Stadium: Azadi Stadium; Referee: Mohsen Torki
Note: Postponed due to air pollution in Tehran .

13 January 2013 21	Saba Qom	0–0	Persepolis	Qom
15:00 UTC+03:30	F. Karimi (yellow card) 62'	Summary; Live TV: IRIB TV3 / Jame Jam 2	M. Nouri (yellow card) 85'	Stadium: Yadegar-e Emam Stadium; Attendance: 10,000; Referee: Alireza Faghani

18 January 2013 22	Persepolis	1–0	Damash	Tehran
15:30 UTC+03:30	H. Mahini 40' (pen.)	Summary; Live TV: IRIB TV3 / Jame Jam 2	M. Mokhtari (yellow card) 31'; M. Mahdavi (yellow card) 50'; M. Abshak (yellow card) 81'	Stadium: Azadi Stadium; Attendance: 40,000; Referee: Touraj Haghverdi

25 January 2013 23	Esteghlal	0–0	Persepolis	Tehran
15:00 UTC+03:30		Summary; Live TV: IRIB TV3 / Jame Jam 2	R. Haghighi (yellow card) 45+1'	Stadium: Azadi Stadium; Attendance: 100,000; Referee: Mohsen Ghahremani

30 January 2013 24	Persepolis	0–0	Foolad	Tehran
16:50 UTC+03:30	M. Pouladi (yellow card) 11'; M. Bengar (yellow card) 57'	Summary; Live TV: IRIB TV3 / Jame Jam 2		Stadium: Azadi Stadium; Attendance: 5,000; Referee: Saeid Mozaffarizadeh

9 February 2013 25	Naft Tehran	1–1	Persepolis	Tehran
15:00 UTC+03:30	M. Seifi 1'; M. Mehrazma (yellow card) 78'; V. Hamdinejad (yellow card) 84'; B. Kamel (yellow card) 88'	Summary; Live TV: IRIB TV3 / Jame Jam 2	Vlatko G. 18'; K. Ansarifard (yellow card) 82'; R. Haghighi (yellow card) 86'	Stadium: Azadi Stadium; Attendance: 10,000; Referee: Yadollah Jahanbazi
Note: Persepolis head coach Yahya Golmohammadi was expelled in the 83rd minute for protesting.

13 February 2013 20	Persepolis	3–2	Gahar	Tehran
17:10 UTC+03:30	Gh. Rezaei 17' (yellow card) 63'; M. Bengar (yellow card) 56'; H. Norouzi 69' (yellow card) 90+5'; M. Perović 89'; M. Ghazi (yellow card) 90'; H. Mahini (penalty missed); M. Nouri (yellow card) 90+4'	Summary; Live TV: IRIB TV3 / Jame Jam 2	H. Pouromrani 47' (yellow card) 80'; M. Khamisi 55'; M. Shafiei (yellow card) 90+2'; A. Ghasemi (yellow card) 90+4'; R. Kardoust (red card)	Stadium: Azadi Stadium; Attendance: 20,000; Referee: Saeid Bakhshizadeh
Note: Yahya Golmohammadi was suspended for this match. Mojtaba Hosseini managed Persepolis in his place. Reza Kardoust was sent off after the finish whistle.

17 February 2013 26	Persepolis	1–0	Sepahan	Tehran
17:20 UTC+03:30	M. Naghizadeh (yellow card) 22'; M. Pouladi (yellow card) 90'; H. Norouzi 90+2'	Summary; Live TV: IRIB TV3 / Jame Jam 2	F. Talebi (yellow card) 3'; M. Susak (yellow card) 18' (yellow-red card) 66'; Xh. Sukaj (yellow card) 47'; O. Ebrahimi (yellow card) 57'; Sh. Gordan (yellow card) 67'	Stadium: Azadi Stadium; Attendance: 15,000; Referee: Touraj Haghverdi

22 February 2013 27	Aluminium	0–0	Persepolis	Bandar-Abbas
14:30 UTC+03:30		Sumaary; Live TV: IRIB TV3 / Jame Jam 2	Vlatko G. (yellow card) 41'; A. Noormohammadi (yellow card) 58'; H. Norouzi (yellow card) 73'	Stadium: Khalij Fars Stadium; Attendance: 20,000; Referee: Ahmad Salehi
Note: Persepolis head coach Yahya Golmohammadi was expelled in the 59th minute for protesting. Mojtaba Hosseini Persepolis first team coach also expelled in 89th minute for protesting.

28 February 2013 28	Persepolis	4–1	Saipa	Tehran
17:20 UTC+03:30	M. Naghizadeh 7'; Gh. Rezaei 12'; R. Haghighi 45+1' (pen.) (yellow card) 85'; M. Perović (yellow card) 49'; M. Nouri 90+3'	Summary; Live TV: IRIB TV3 / Jame Jam 2	R. Shahalidoost 51'	Stadium: Azadi Stadium; Attendance: 8,000; Referee: Saeid Mozaffarizadeh
Note: Persepolis head coach Yahya Golmohammadi was originally suspended for this match but was pardoned by FFIRI Disciplinarian Committee.

10 March 2013 29	Rah Ahan	1–0	Persepolis	Tehran
17:30 UTC+03:30	A. Azimi 58' (yellow card) 85'; H. Noormohammadi (yellow card) 69'; B. Yavarzadeh (yellow card) 90+1'	Summary; Live TV: IRIB TV3 / Jame Jam 2		Stadium: Azadi Stadium; Attendance: 5,100; Referee: Mohsen Ghahremani

15 March 2013 30	Persepolis	2–2	Mes Kerman	Tehran
17:35 UTC+03:30	M. Perović 10'; H. Mahini (yellow card) 13'; R. Haghighi (yellow card) 25'; M. Naghizadeh 46'	Summary; Live TV: IRIB TV3 / Jame Jam 2	H. Kazemi (yellow card) 14'; R. Enayati 17'; A. Hassanzadeh 90+2'	Stadium: Azadi Stadium; Attendance: 10,000; Referee: Yadollah Jahanbazi

31 March 2013 31	Paykan	1–2	Persepolis	Tehran
17:00 UTC+04:30	H. Divsalar (yellow card) 34'; K. Vahdani 51'	Summary; Live TV: IRIB TV3 / Jame Jam 2	A. Feshangchi (yellow card) 51'; K. Ansarifard 73'; M. Nouri 77'; M. Ghazi (yellow card) 79'	Stadium: Azadi Stadium; Attendance: 15,000; Referee: Touraj Haghverdi

12 April 2013 32	Zob Ahan	1–1	Persepolis	Fuladshahr
17:00 UTC+04:30	M. Borjlou (yellow card) 17'; H. Shafaat (yellow card) 39'; M. Rajabzadeh 71'	Summary; Live TV: IRIB TV3 / Jame Jam 2	Vlatko G. 20'; M. Naghizadeh (yellow card) 45+1'; M. Bengar (yellow card) 70'	Stadium: Foolad Shahr Stadium; Attendance: 10,000; Referee: Alborz Hajipour

29 April 2013 33	Persepolis	1–0	Malavan	Tehran
19:15 UTC+04:30	K. Ansarifard 56'; A. Feshangchi (yellow card); A. Kolahkaj (yellow card); R. Haghighi (yellow card)	Summary; Live TV: IRIB TV3 / Jame Jam 2	J. Shirzad (yellow card); P. Nouri (yellow card)	Stadium: Azadi Stadium; Attendance: 8,000; Referee: Ahmad Salehi

10 May 2013 34	Tractor Sazi	3–1	Persepolis	Tabriz
18:00 UTC+04:30	M. Seyed-Salehi 33'; M. Karimian 53'; Geílson S. 90'; J. Kazemian (yellow card) 35'; M. Ebrahimi (yellow card) 89'	Summary; Live TV: IRIB TV3 / Jame Jam 2	R. Haghighi (yellow card) 36' (goal) 70'; M. Khanzadeh (yellow card) 58'; F. Ahmadzadeh (yellow card) 71'; J. Hosseini (yellow card) 75'	Stadium: Yadegar-e Emam Stadium; Attendance: 10,000; Referee: Mohammad Reza Akbarian

==== Score overview ====
Win Draw Loss

Opposition	Home score	Away score	Aggregate score
Aluminium Hormozgan	1–0	0–0	1–0
Esteghlal	0–0	0–0	0–0
Foolad	0–0	1–1	1–1
Damash	1–0	1–0	1–1
Fajr Sepasi	2–3	0–2	4–3
Malavan	1–0	2–2	3–2
Mes Kerman	2–2	2–1	3–4
Gahar	3–2	1–1	4–3
Naft Tehran	0–0	1–1	1–1
Paykan	6–0	1–2	8–1
Rah Ahan	2–0	1–0	2–1
Saba	0–2	0–0	0–2
Saipa	4–1	0–0	4–1
Sanat Naft	2–2	0–1	3–2
Sepahan	1–0	2–0	1–2
Tractor	0–1	3–1	1–4
Zob Ahan	3–2	1–1	4–3

=== Hazfi Cup ===
==== Matches ====
Win Draw Loss Postponed

Date Round	Home	Score	Away	Location

19 December 2012 Round of 32	Persepolis	6–0	Malavan	Tehran
16:15 UTC+03:30	H. Norouzi 2', 51'; K. Ansarifard (yellow card) 16' (goal) 19', 76', 80'; A. Karimi (yellow card) 37'; A. Feshangchi (yellow card) 47'; Gh. Rezaei 83'	Summary; Live TV: IRIB TV3 / Jame Jam 2	B. Pourgholami (yellow card) 17'; P. Nouri (yellow card) 85'	Stadium: Azadi Stadium; Attendance: 15,000; Referee: Mohsen Torki

8 January 2013 Round of 16	Naft Tehran	1–4	Persepolis	Tehran
16:00 UTC+03:30	A. Manouchehri 14'; H. Fallahzadeh (yellow card) 73'	Summary; Live TV: IRIB TV3 / Jame Jam 2	M. Nouri 26', 57' (yellow card); H. Mahini 75' (pen.); H. Norouzi 85'	Stadium: Azadi Stadium; Attendance: 30,000; Referee: Saeid Mozaffarizadeh

5 March 2013 Quarter-Final	Zob Ahan	0–1 (a.e.t.)	Persepolis	Fuladshahr
15:30 UTC+03:30	M. Bayatinia (yellow card) 81'; P. Sadeghian (yellow card) 110'	Summary; Live TV: IRIB TV3 / Jame Jam 2	R. Haghighi (yellow card) 47'; H. Norouzi (yellow card) 53'; M. Nouri 102'; M. Ghazi (yellow card) 107'	Stadium: Foolad Shahr Stadium; Attendance: 15,000; Referee: Alireza Faghani

6 April 2013 Semi-Final	Damash	1–1 (a.e.t.) (3–5 p)	Persepolis	Rasht
17:00 UTC+04:30	M. Abshak (yellow card) 45+1'; M. Mokhtari (yellow card) 56'; Motevaselzadeh 70'	Summary; Live TV: IRIB TV3 / Jame Jam 2	J. Hosseini (yellow card) 77'; Nouri 83'	Stadium: Shahid Dr. Azodi Stadium; Attendance: 15,000; Referee: Saeid Mozafarizadeh
	Penalties
	(penalty missed) Rahimi; (penalty scored) Abshak; (penalty scored) Chavoshi; (penalty scored) Ebrahimi		(penalty scored) Norouzi; (penalty scored) Mahini; (penalty scored) Hosseini; (penalty scored) Karimi; (penalty scored) Ansarifard

5 May 2013 Final	Persepolis	2–2 (a.e.t.) (2–4 p)	Sepahan	Tehran
18:00 UTC+04:30	K. Ansarifard 25'; R. Haghighi (yellow card) 29'; M. Nouri (yellow card) 40' (goal) 98'; H. Mahini (yellow card) During the penalties'	Live TV: IRIB TV3 / Jame Jam 2	M. Khalatbari (yellow card) 45+1'; Xh. Sukaj 59'; O. Ebrahimi (yellow card) 100'; M. Gholami 106'	Stadium: Azadi Stadium; Attendance: 97,452; Referee: Alireza Faghani
	Penalties
	(penalty missed) Norouzi; (penalty scored) Mahini; (penalty missed) Haghighi; (penalty scored) Naghizadeh		(penalty scored) Bulku; (penalty scored) Khalatbari; (penalty scored) Ebrahimi; (penalty scored) Hajsafi

=== Friendly Matches ===
==== Pre-season ====
Win Draw Loss Postponed

Date Round	Home	Score	Away	Location

3 July 2012	Persepolis	0–2	Saba Qom	Tehran
18:00 UTC+04:30		Match Summary	F. Karimi 27'; M. Soleiman Fallah 55'	Stadium: Derafshifar Stadium; Attendance: 150

9 July 2012	Persepolis	1–2	Aluminium	Tehran
18:00 UTC+04:30	K. Ansarifard 63'	Match Summary	S. Raahrou 68'; Sh. Gordan 85' (o.g.)	Stadium: Derafshifar Stadium; Attendance: 400

12 July 2012	Persepolis	2–1	Foolad	Tehran
18:00 UTC+04:30	J. Kazemian 39'; M. Ghazi 82'	Match Summary	S. Ansari 65'	Stadium: Derafshifar Stadium; Attendance: 6,000

==== During season ====
9 August 2012	Persepolis	3–2	Nirouye Zamini	Tehran
18:00 UTC+03:30	E. Zayed 15'; M. Madanchi 45'; R. Seifollahi 88'	Match Summary	A. Javadipour 3'; F. Torabi 12'	Stadium: Derafshifar Stadium; Attendance: 100

13 August 2012	Persepolis	2–0	Bargh Shiraz	Tehran
18:00 UTC+03:30	H. Norouzi 50'; E. Zayed 63'	Match Summary		Stadium: Derafshifar Stadium; Attendance: 100

5 September 2012	Persepolis	2–2	Shahrdari Yasuj	Tehran
18:10 UTC+03:30	H. Norouzi 20'; M. Mahdavikia 90+2'; H. Aliasgari (yellow card)	Summary	M. Jafari 31'; M. Darabi 58'; A. Namazi (yellow card)	Stadium: Derafshifar Stadium; Attendance: 50

10 September 2012	Persepolis	6–0	Homa Qom	Tehran
18:00 UTC+03:30	H. Norouzi 17', 40'; Gh. Rezaei 20', 35'; 39' (o.g.); R. Seifollahi 90+2'	Summary		Stadium: Derafshifar Stadium; Attendance: 30

14 October 2012	Persepolis	2–2	Saipa Shomal	Tehran
16:00 UTC+03:30	M. Mahdavikia 10'; J. Kazemian 75' (pen.); S. Aghazamani (red card) 80'		I. Jafaroğlu 30'; H. Riahi 70'	Stadium: Takhti Stadium; Attendance: 500; Referee: Ali Hashemi

17 October 2012	Persepolis	4–0	Persepolis Varamin	Tehran
15:00 UTC+03:30	M. Mahdavikia; J. Kazemian; H. Norouzi; M. Madanchi			Stadium: Azadi 2nd Ground; Attendance: 30; Referee: Ali Hashemi

8 November 2012	Persepolis	7–0	Shahrdari Nazarabad	Tehran
15:00 UTC+03:30	S. Aghazamani 15'; M. Mahdavikia 25'; J. Kazemian 31', 35'; Gh. Rezaei 50'; H. Norouzi 52' (pen.), 83'; R. Seifollahi (penalty missed)			Stadium: Derafshifar Stadium; Attendance: 100

23 November 2012	Persepolis	5–0	Shahrdari Baghestan	Tehran
15:00 UTC+03:30	J. Kazemian; H. Norouzi; S. Aghazamani; R. Seifollahi; M. Pouladi			Stadium: Derafshifar Stadium; Attendance: 200

10 December 2012	Persepolis	1–1	Saipa Mehr	Tehran
14:00 UTC+03:30	J. Kazemian 60'		M. Khodaei 67'	Stadium: Derafshifar Stadium

14 December 2012	Persepolis	1–0	Sang Ahan Bafq	Tehran
14:30 UTC+03:30	J. Hosseini 40'			Stadium: Derafshifar Stadium; Attendance: 200

31 December 2012	Persepolis	2–1	Sanat Sari	Tehran
15:30 UTC+03:30	H. Norouzi 26'; R. Seifollahi			Stadium: Derafshifar Stadium; Attendance: 30

19 January 2013	Persepolis	1–0	Rad Poyan	Tehran
15:00 UTC+03:30	H. Norouzi 45'			Stadium: Kheyriye Amal Stadium; Attendance: 20

5 February 2013	Persepolis	5–0	Shahrdari Baghestan	Kordan, Karaj
14:50 UTC+03:30	M. Ghazi 10'; M. Nouri 20'; M. Mahdavikia 55'; H. Norouzi (red card) 60'; F. Ahmadzadeh 60', 70'			Stadium: Chahar Bagh Stadium; Attendance: 100

23 February 2013	Persepolis	4–1	Iran U17	Tehran
15:30 UTC+03:30	A. Esmaeilzadeh 10'; K. Ansarifard 55'; R. Cheshmi 62'; M. Khanzadeh 70'			Stadium: Derafshifar Stadium

11 March 2013	Persepolis	4–1	Persepolis Qaem Shahr	Tehran
15:00 UTC+03:30	R. Seifollahi 2'; F. Ahmadzadeh 50'; M. Ghazi 65', 80'		S. Ashuri 30'	Stadium: Derafshifar Stadium

26 March 2013	Persepolis	5–0	Iran U17	Tehran
17:00 UTC+04:30	M. Nouri; K. Ansarifard; M. Hashemi (o.g.); F. Ahmadzadeh			Stadium: National teams camp

20 April 2013	Persepolis	3–0	Paykan	Tehran
17:00 UTC+04:30	K. Ansarifard 50'; A. Esmaeilzadeh 75'; R. Seifollahi 89'			Stadium: Derafshifar Stadium; Attendance: 200

24 April 2013	Persepolis	1–0	Saipa	Tehran
17:00 UTC+04:30	K. Ansarifard 68'			Stadium: Derafshifar Stadium; Attendance: 50

== Statistics ==
=== Appearances, goals and disciplinary record ===
				Pro League							Hazfi Cup							Total						
No	P	N	Name	S	P		A	Yellow card	Double yellow card	Red card	S	P		A	Yellow card	Double yellow card	Red card	S	P		A	Yellow card	Double yellow card	Red card
1	GK	(Iran)	Reza Mohammadi	1	1													1	1					
1	GK	(Iran)	Shahab Gordan^{1}	5	5													5	5					
2	RM	(Iran)	Mehdi Mahdavikia	13	16	3	4	2				2						13	18	3	4	**2**		
4	CB	(Iran)	Jalal Hosseini	31	31	1		4			5	5			1			36	36	1		**5**		
5	DM	(Iran)	Saman Aghazamani^{1}	4	9			1										4	9			**1**		
6	CB	(Iran)	Mohsen Bengar	23	24		1	6			3	3						28	29		1	**6**		
7	RM	(Iran)	Hamidreza Aliasgari^{1}	2	7		1											2	7		1			
8	AM	(Iran)	Ali Karimi	7	12	1	1	2			3	4			1			10	16	1	1	**2**		
9	CF	(Iran)	Karim Ansarifard	23	31	8	5	4			4	5	4	1	1			27	36	12	6	**5**		
10	RW	(Iran)	Gholamreza Rezaei	17	23	3	2	3			4	5	1	5				21	28	4	7	**3**		
11	CF	(Iran)	Mohammad Ghazi	9	23	3	1	3				1			1			9	24	3	1	**4**		
12	CF	(Libya)	Eamon Zayed^{1}	1	6			1										1	6			**1**		
13	RB	(Iran)	Hossein Mahini	30	30	1	5	3			5	5	1		1			35	35	2	6	**3**		
14	AM	(Iran)	Mohammad Nouri	24	29	5	3	3			3	5	5	2	2			27	34	10	5	**5**		
15	CB	(Iran)	Roozbeh Cheshmi^{2}																					
15	DM	(Brazil)	Roberto Sousa^{1}	3	3													3	3					
16	LB	(Iran)	Mehrdad Pouladi	19	20		1	5	1		3	3						22	23		1	**5**	**1**	
17	CM	(North Macedonia)	Vlatko Grozdanovski^{2}	9	10	2	1	1			2	2						11	12	2	1	**1**		
17	RW	(Iran)	Javad Kazemian^{1}	6	13	1	1	2										6	13	1	1	**2**		
18	DM	(Iran)	Meysam Naghizadeh^{2}	17	19	2		2			2	3						19	22	2		**2**		
19	LB	(Iran)	Saeid Ghadami																					
20	CB	(Iran)	Alireza Nourmohammadi	22	22	1		3			1	1						23	23	1		**3**		
21	GK	(Iran)	Amir Abedzadeh																					
22	LM	(Iran)	Mehrzad Madanchi	4	5			1										4	5			**1**		
23	LM	(Iran)	Amirhossein Feshangchi	17	21	2	1	3			3	4			1			20	25	2	1	**4**		
24	SS	(Iran)	Hadi Norouzi	15	25	4	4	5			2	5	3	1	1			17	30	7	5	**6**		
27	SS	(Iran)	Rouhollah Seifollahi	1	3													1	3					
28	GK	(Iran)	Masoud Dastani																					
29	LM	(Serbia)	Marko Perović^{2}	11	13	2		1			3	3						14	16	2		**1**		
30	CB	(Iran)	Mohammad Reza Khanzadeh	9	12			2			1	1						10	13			**2**		
31	AM	(Iran)	Afshin Esmaeilzadeh	1	1													1	1					
32	SS	(Iran)	Farshad Ahmadzadeh^{2}		1			1				1							2			**1**		
33	DM	(Iran)	Reza Haghighi^{2}	14	14	2	1	6			5	5			2			19	19	2	1	**8**		
35	CB	(Iran)	Hossein Kanaani																					
39	CM	(Iran)	Adel Kolahkaj^{2}	5	12			1			1	2						6	14			1		
40	GK	(Brazil)	Nilson Corrêa	28	28						5	5						33	33					
Totals						41	32	65	1	0			12	7	9	0	0			53	39	73	1	0

- Top scorer of competition
Updated as of 5 May 2013

^{1} Player left the club during the season

^{2} Player joined the club during the season

=== Goalkeeping ===
			League			Hazfi Cup			Total		
No	N	Name	M	GA	CS	M	GA	CS	M	GA	CS
40	(Brazil)	Nilson	28	20	14	5	4	2	**33**	**24**	**16**
1	(Iran)	Shahab Gordan	5	8	1	–	–	–	**5**	**8**	**1**
1	(Iran)	Reza Mohammadi	1	3	0	–	–	–	**1**	**3**	**0**
Total			34	31	15	5	4	2	39	35	17

=== Injuries during The season ===
Players in bold are still out from their injuries.

No.	Nat	Pos	Name	Date	Injury	Estimated Return Date	Source
15	DM	(Brazil)	Roberto Sousa	30 July 2012	Cruciate ligament	End of season	Perspolisnews.com
28	GK	(Iran)	Masoud Dastani	23 August 2012	Shoulder	October 2012	Perspolisnews.com
5	DM	(Iran)	Saman Aghazamani	19 August 2012	Ankle ligament	September 2012	Perspolisnews.com
23	LM	(Iran)	Amir Hossein Feshangchi	29 August 2012	Ankle ligament	October 2012	Perspolisnews.com
16	CM	(Iran)	Mehrdad Pouladi	2 September 2012	Hamstring muscle	October 2012	Perspolisnews.com
11	CF	(Iran)	Mohammad Ghazi	7 September 2012	Medial collateral ligament	September 2012	fc–Perspolis.com
10	RW	(Iran)	Gholamreza Rezaei	13 September 2012	Groin	October 2012	Perspolisnews.com
8	AM	(Iran)	Ali Karimi	13 January 2013	Medial collateral ligament	March 2013	
33	DM	(Iran)	Reza Haghighi	15 March 2013	Knee	April 2013	Khabaronline.ir
16	LB	(Iran)	Mehrdad Pouladi	26 March 2013	Achilles tendon	May 2013	Perspolisnews.com
20	CB	(Iran)	Alireza Nourmohammadi	10 April 2013	Quadriceps	April 2013	fc-Perspolis.com
13	RB	(Iran)	Hossein Mahini	12 April 2013	Groin	May 2013	

=== Overall statistics ===
	Total	Home	Away	Neutral
Games played	39	19	20	0
Games won	16	10	6	0
Games drawn	13	7	7	0
Games lost	9	4	5	0
Biggest win	N/A	N/A	N/A	N/A
Biggest loss	N/A	N/A	N/A	N/A
Biggest win (League)	N/A	N/A	N/A	N/A
Biggest win (Cup)	N/A	N/A	N/A	N/A
Biggest loss (League)	N/A	N/A	N/A	N/A
Biggest loss (Cup)	N/A	N/A	N/A	N/A
Clean sheets	17	10	7	0
Goals scored	55	36	19	0
Goals conceded	36	17	19	0
Goal difference	+19	+19	0	+0
Average GF per game	0	0	0	0
Average GA per game	0	0	0	0
Points (League)	50	32	18	0
Winning rate	N/A	N/A	N/A	N/A
Most appearances	N/A	N/A		
Most minutes played	Jalal Hosseini (3330')	N/A		
Top scorer	Karim Ansarifard (12)	N/A		
Top assister	Karim Ansarifard (6)	N/A		

Updated as of 10 May 2013
Source: Competitions

== Club ==
=== Kit ===
Supplier: (Germany) Uhlsport

Home Kit	Away Kit	Third Kit

Source: "Persepolis FC' current kit". Archived from the original on 29 January 2010.

=== Official sponsors ===
(Germany) Uhlsport • Sadra System Pasargad • Iran Aseman Airlines • (Germany) Opel Iran

• Damavand Mineral Water Co.

Source: Persian

=== Starting formations ===
Qnt	Formation	Matches	
Qnt	Formation	PL	HC
16	4–4–2	1–5, 26-28, 30-34	1/8 – Semi-final – Final
12	3–5–2	6–17	
10	4–4–2 diamond	18–25	1/32 – 1/16
1	4–2–3-1	29	

Last updated: 10 May 2013
Source: Match reports in Competitions
Only competitive matches.

=== Captains ===
Updated on 10 May 2013

No.	Pos	Nat	Name	Pro League	Hazfi Cup	No.Games as Captain	Notes
2	MF	(Iran)	Mehdi Mahdavikia	13	0	13	Captain
8	MF	(Iran)	Ali Karimi	5	3	8	Vice-Captain
14	MF	(Iran)	Mohammad Nouri	7	0	7	4th Captain
24	FW	(Iran)	Hadi Norouzi	4	1	5	3rd Captain
4	DF	(Iran)	Jalal Hosseini	2	0	2	5th Captain
10	FW	(Iran)	Gholamreza Rezaei	1	1	2	
22	MF	(Iran)	Mehrzad Madanchi	1	0	1	
17	FW	(Iran)	Javad Kazemian ♦	1	0	1	

♦ Players who no longer play for Persepolis's current season.

=== Coaching staff ===
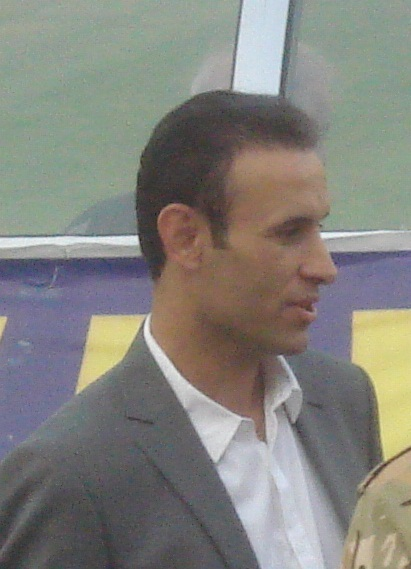
Yahya Golmohammadi, Persepolis head coach in the 2012–13 season

Position	Staff
Head coach	(Iran) Yahya Golmohammadi
Assistant coach	(Iran) Mojtaba Hosseini
First Team coach	(Iran) Karim Bagheri
First Team coach	(Iran) Reza Torabian
Fitness Trainer	(Iran) Farhad Chizari
Goalkeepers coach	(Iran) Saeid Azizian
Analyzer	(Iran) Edmond Bezik
Doctor	(Iran) Vajiolah Cheshme Sari
Physiotherapists	(Iran) Meysam Alipour
Doctor Supply	(Iran) Dr.Faraj Zadeh
Doctor Clinic	(Iran) Dr.Sodi
Psychologist	(Iran) Mehdi Khanban
Team Manager	(Iran) Saeid Shirini

==== Jose's Coaching staff ====
Position	Staff
Head coach	(Portugal) Manuel José
Assistant coach	(Iran) Yahya Golmohammadi
First Team coach	(Portugal) Pedro Barny
Fitness Trainer	(Portugal) Fidalgo Antunes
Goalkeepers coach	(Egypt) Ahmed Nagi
Analyzer	(Argentina) Oscar Lindazo
Doctor	(Iran) Vajiolah Cheshme Sari
Physiotherapists	(Iran) Meysam Alipour
Doctor Supply	(Iran) Dr.Faraj Zadeh
Doctor Clinic	(Iran) Dr.Sodi
Psychologist	(Iran) Mehdi Khanban
Team Manager	(Iran) Saeid Shirini

=== Other personnel ===
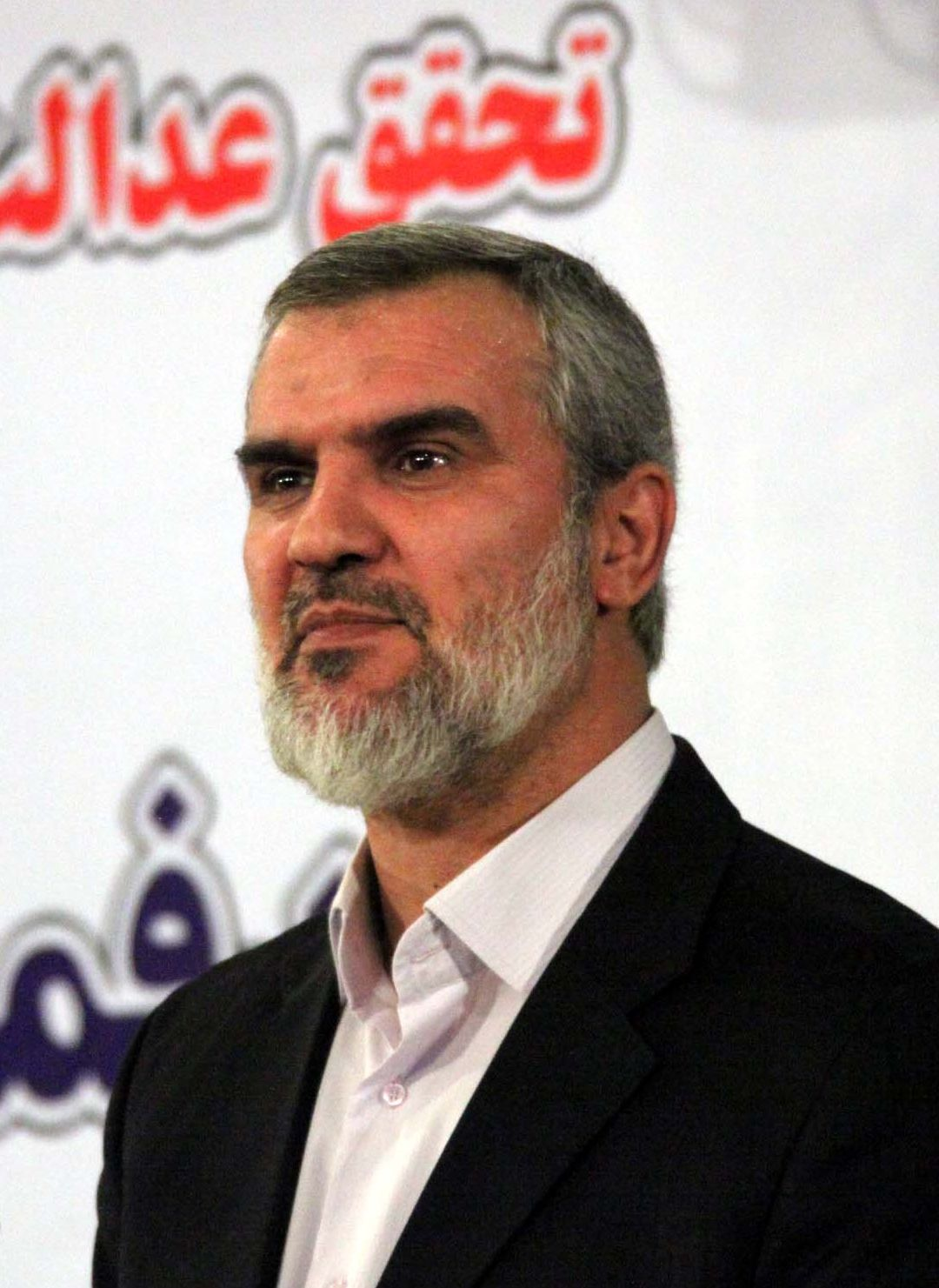
Mohammad Rouyanian, Pesepolis chairman in the 2012–13 season

Chairman	(Iran) Mohammad Rouyanian
Deputy Chairman	(Iran) Behroz Motaghami
Adviser High Chairman	(Iran) Jafar Kashani
Adviser Chairman	(Iran) Jamshid Zare
Assistant Execution	(Iran) Saeid Shirini
Assistant Manager Cultural	(Iran) Amir Giroudi
Football Academy President	(Iran) Hamid Estili
Things Pioneers Manager	(Iran) Iraj Pazoki
Media Officer	(Iran) Hamid Abbasi
Media Supervisor	(Iran) Hossein Ghodosi
Disciplinarian Committee Ruler	(Iran) Mahmoud Salarkia
Assistant Legal	(Iran) Mostafa Shokri
Official Manager	(Iran) Mohsen Sohrabi
Official Website	(Iran) Mosa Hosseini

Updated to match played 30 July 2012
Source: fc-perspolis.com

=== Club committees ===
Board of Directions
(Iran) Mohammad Rouyanian (Chairman)
(Iran) Ali Parvin
(Iran) Mehdi Taj
(Iran) Fada Hossein Maleki (CEO)
(Iran) Mohammad Hossein Nejadfallah

Technical Committee
(Iran) Ali Parvin (President)
(Iran) Reza Vatankhah
(Iran) Afshin Peyrovani
(Iran) Ebrahim Ashtiani
(Iran) Mahmoud Khordbin

Medico Committee
(Iran) Professor Farhad Farid
(Iran) Dr. Majid Laelroshan
(Iran) Dr. Babak Zargar Amini
(Iran) Dr. Amir Hossein Barati
(Iran) Dr. Mohammad Taban
(Iran) Dr. Darioush Soudi

Munition Team
(Iran) Ghasem Abdolsamadi
(Iran) Asghar Norouzali

Updated to match played 8 July 2012
Source: fc-perspolis.com

=== Grounds ===
Ground (capacity and dimensions)	Azadi Stadium (100,000 / 110x75m)
Training ground	Derafshifar Stadium

== See also ==
- 2012–13 Persian Gulf Cup
- 2012–13 Hazfi Cup
