= Meysam Naghizadeh =

Iranian footballer

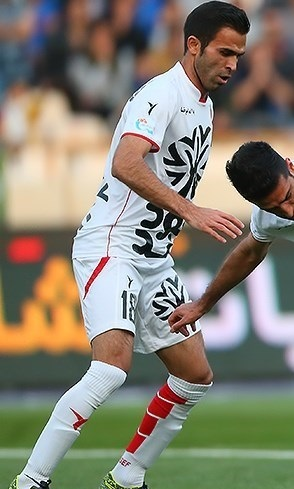

Personal information
- Full name: Meysam Naghizadeh Bani
- Date of birth: 20 May 1986 (age 40)
- Place of birth: Marand, Iran
- Height: 1.78 m (5 ft 10 in)
- Position: Defensive midfielder

Team information
- Current team: Fard Alborz
- Number: 14

Youth career
- 2005–2008: Machine Sazi

Senior career*
Years	Team	Apps	(Gls)
2008–2012	Machine Sazi	80	(5)
2012–2013	Persepolis	20	(2)
2013–2015	Gostaresh	56	(1)
2015–2016	Padideh	29	(0)
2016–2017	Khoneh Be Khoneh	27	(4)
2017–2019	Pars Jonoubi	46	(0)
2019–2020	Naft Masjed Soleyman	28	(0)
2020–2021	Mes Rafsanjan	27	(0)
2021–2023	Naft Masjed Soleyman	48	(0)
2023–2024	Kavir Moghava		
2024–	Fard Alborz		
- * Club domestic league appearances and goals as of 18 May 2023

Meysam Naghizadeh (Persian: میثم نقی زاده; born 20 May 1986) is an Iranian football midfielder who plays for League 2 club Fard Alborz.

== Club career ==
=== Persepolis ===
He joined Persepolis in August 2012. He signed a three-year contract until the end of the 2014–15 season. He made his debut for Persepolis against Foolad on 29 August when he was used as a substitute. He scored his first goal in a match against Saipa on 28 February 2013.

=== Gostaresh ===
After a season with Tehran giants Persepolis, he joined Tabriz side, Gostaresh with a four-year contract on 13 June 2013.

=== Club career statistics ===
As of 30 December 2017

Club	Division	Season	League		Hazfi Cup		Asia		Total	
Club	Division	Season	Apps	Goals	Apps	Goals	Apps	Goals	Apps	Goals
Machine; Sazi	Division 1	2008–09	20	1	1	0	–	–	21	1
Machine; Sazi	Division 2	2009–10	16	1	1	0	–	–	17	1
Machine; Sazi	Division 1	2010–11	24	2	2	0	–	–	26	2
Machine; Sazi	Division 1	2011–12	20	1	1	0	–	–	21	1
Persepolis	Pro League	2012–13	17	2	2	0	–	–	19	2
Gostaresh	Pro League	2013–14	30	0	1	0	–	–	31	0
Gostaresh	Pro League	2014–15	25	1	0	0	–	–	25	1
Padideh	Pro League	2015-16	29	0	0	0	–	–	29	0
Khoneh Be Khone	Division 1	2016-17	25	4	0	0	–	–	25	4
Pars Jonoubi	Pro league	2017-18	12	0	0	0	–	–	12	0
Career Totals			183	12	7	0	0	0	191	12

- Assist Goals

Season	Team	Assists
12–13	Persepolis	0
13–14	Gostaresh	1
14–15	Gostaresh	0

== Honours ==
- Hazfi Cup: 2012–13 (Runner-up)
