= Saman Aghazamani =

Iranian footballer

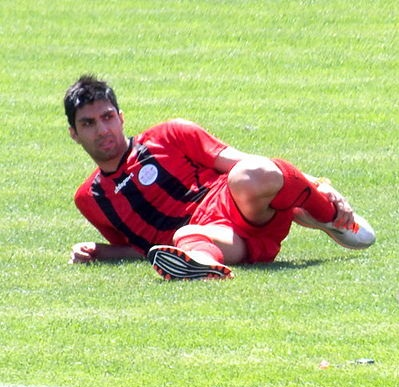

Personal information
- Full name: Saman Aghazamani
- Date of birth: 14 January 1989 (age 37)
- Place of birth: Iran, Tehran
- Height: 1.83 m (6 ft 0 in)
- Position: Right back

Team information
- Current team: Iran national U16 (assistant)

Youth career
- 2018–2020: Saipa

Senior career*
Years	Team	Apps	(Gls)
2008-2009	Saipa	2	(0)
2009–2013	Persepolis	65	(0)
2013–2014	Rah Ahan	26	(0)
2014–2015	Ararat Yerevan	10	(2)
2015–2016	Saba Qom	18	(0)
2017–2018	Naft Tehran	13	(0)
2018–2019	Gol Reyhan Alborz	8	(0)
2019	Aluminium Arak	12	(0)

International career^{‡}
2006-2007	Iran national U17	6	(0)
2007–2009	Iran national U20	5	(0)
2009 2011	Iran national U23	12	(2)
- * Club domestic league appearances and goals as of 10 May 2019 ‡ National team caps and goals as of 19 June 2017

Saman Aghazamani (Persian: سامان آقازمانی, born January 14, 1989) ) is a retired Iranian footballer who last played for Aluminium Arak and Perspolis among other clubs in Persian Gulf Pro League.

He has played for Saipa Tehran, Persepolis Tehran, Rah Ahan, Ararat Yerevan, Saba Qom, Naft Tehran.

Aghazamani was born in Tehran and participated in Iranian youth teams and Omid Iran.

== Club career ==
He started his professional career with Saipa and moved to Persepolis June 2009 and was used as defensive midfielder, right back. He extended his contract with Persepolis for three years, kepping him in the team till 2015.

On 13 January 2014, Aghazamani joined Rah Ahan with signing a two-and-a-half-year contract.

=== Club career statistics ===
- Last Update: 10 May 2016

Club performance			League		Cup		Continental		Total	
Season	Club	League	Apps	Goals	Apps	Goals	Apps	Goals	Apps	Goals
Iran			League		Hazfi Cup		Asia		Total	
2008–09	Saipa	Pro League	2	0	0	0	0	0	2	0
2009–10	Persepolis	Pro League	7	2	0	0	–		7	0
2010–11	Persepolis	Pro League	12	3	4	0	5	0	21	0
2011–12	Persepolis	Pro League	18	9	2	0	4	0	24	0
2012-13	Persepolis	Pro League	8	3	–	–	–	–	–	–
2012–13	Persepolis	Pro League	9	0	0	0	–		9	0
2012–13	Rah Ahan	Pro League	12	0	0	0	–		12	0
2013–14	Rah Ahan	Pro League	14	0	3	0	–		17	0
2014–15	Ararat	Armenian Premier League	10	2	0	0	–		10	2
2015–16	Saba Qom	Pro League	18	0	0	0	–		18	0
Career Total			110	19	9	0	9	0	120	2

== International career ==
Aghazamani is also part of Iran U23. He was captain of Iran U20.

== Honours ==
Persepolis

- Hazfi Cup: 2009–10, 2010–11
