= Amir Abedzadeh =

Iranian footballer (born 1993)

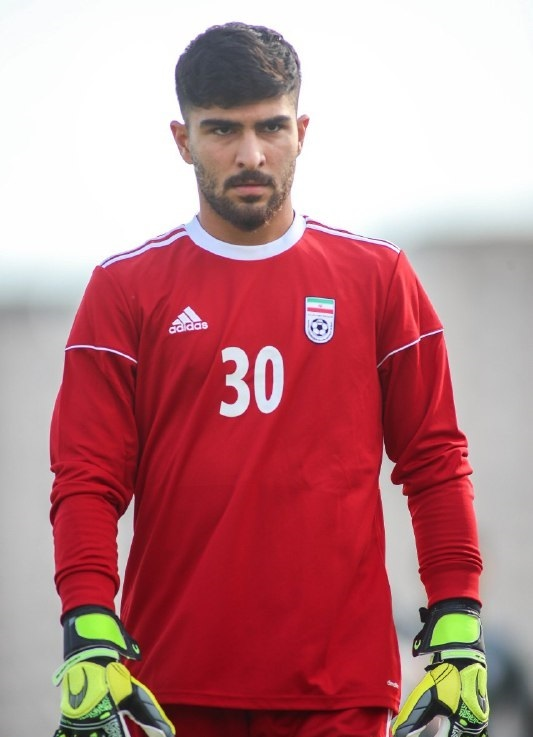
- Amir with Iran in 2018

Personal information
- Full name: Amir Abedzadeh
- Date of birth: 26 April 1993 (age 33)
- Place of birth: Tehran, Iran
- Height: 1.87 m (6 ft 2 in)
- Position: Goalkeeper

Team information
- Current team: Ponferradina
- Number: 25

Youth career
- 2006–2007: Persepolis
- 2008: Brentford
- 2008–2009: Dinamo Dorigo
- 2009: Tottenham Hotspur
- 2009–2010: London Tigers
- 2010: Persian F.C. London
- 2011: LA Blues

Senior career*
Years	Team	Apps	(Gls)
2011–2012	LA Blues	14	(0)
2012–2014	Persepolis	0	(0)
2014–2015	Rah Ahan	9	(0)
2016–2017	Barreirense	0	(0)
2017–2021	Marítimo	75	(0)
2021–2023	Ponferradina	65	(0)
2023–2024	Marítimo	17	(0)
2024–2026	Castellón	7	(0)
2026–	Ponferradina	0	(0)

International career^{‡}
2014–2016	Iran U23	9	(0)
2018–2022	Iran	11	(0)
- * Club domestic league appearances and goals as of 30 June 2026 ‡ National team caps and goals as of 23 September 2022

Amir Abedzadeh (Persian: امیر عابدزاده; born 26 April 1993), known as Amir, is an Iranian professional footballer who plays as a goalkeeper for Ponferradina.

== Club career ==
=== Youth teams ===
Abedzadeh was a member of the Persepolis Youth Academy from 2006 to 2007, having previously trained under his father since he was 7. He moved to the United Kingdom at the age of 15, and after spending two months with the third-tier outfit of Brentford and taking part in a trial with Arsenal, he joined Tottenham Hotspur's academy team in 2009. Abezadeh left Tottenham in the same year, following their signing of Italian goalkeeper Mirko Ranieri.

During his time in the UK, Abedzadeh also played for amateur youth teams Dinamo Dorigo, London Tigers, and Persian FC, the latter of the G.E. Roberts Enfield Football Alliance League.

=== United States ===
Abedzadeh was unable to obtain a work permit in UK and after briefly returning to Iran and training with Iran Pro League side Steel Azin, where his father was a coach, to keep himself on form, he moved to the United States in 2011, and signed for the Los Angeles Blues in the USL Championship, where his father was an assistant coach. He made his debut on 7 June 2011, playing for Los Angeles Blues U-23 (LA Blues' reserve team) in a USL Premier Development League game against Orange County Blue Star. He made eight saves but conceded five goals, and was also shown a yellow card. In 2012, he had the option to join Chivas USA of Major League Soccer, but he decided to extend his contract with the Blues.

=== Persepolis ===
Abedzadeh signed a three-year contract with Persepolis on 15 July 2012. He played for Persepolis U21 in AFC Vision Asia U-21 Tehran Premier League. He scored a goal for Persepolis U21 in game with Niroye Zamini U21. Abedzadeh left the Persepolis in 2014 and without playing a single game for the club.

=== Rah Ahan ===
On 3 July 2014, Abedzadeh joined Rah Ahan with signing a four-year contract. He worked under the supervision of his father, Ahmad Reza Abedzadeh who also worked at Rah Ahan as goalkeeping coach. He played his first professional match on 19 September 2014 against his former team Persepolis, where he came in as a substitute of injured Igor Nenezić in 34th minute. He was released by Rah Ahan at the end of the 2014–15 season.

=== Marítimo ===
Abedzadeh signed with Portuguese Primeira Liga club Marítimo on 23 January 2017 after good performances with Barreirense in the Campeonato de Portugal. He became the second Iranian goalkeeper to sign for the club after Alireza Haghighi who played for the club in 2016. He made his first appearance in September 2017 in a Portuguese League Cup match.

He made his Taça de Portugal debut on 14 October 2017 in a third round match against União Torcatense. Abedzadeh kept a clean sheet and was named Man of the Match, as Marítimo won the match 1–0.

=== Ponferradina ===
Abedzadeh joined SD Ponferradina on 7 July 2021 making him the first Iranian to play for the club.

=== Return to Marítimo ===
On 30 August 2023, Marítimo, who had been relegated to the Liga Portugal 2 the previous season, announced the signing of Abedzadeh.

=== Castellón ===
On 16 July 2024, Abedzadeh joined Spanish Segunda División club CD Castellón. On 17 July 2026, after being only a backup option, he terminated his link with the club.

== International career ==
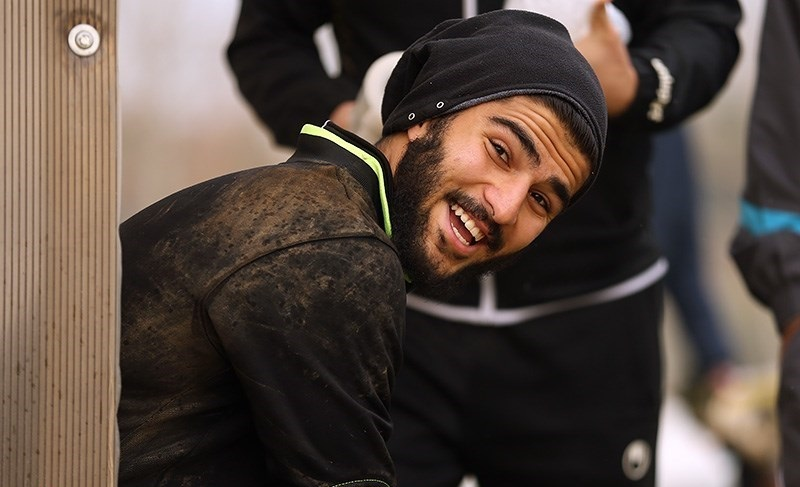
Abedzadeh in training with Iran Olympic team in 2014

Abedzadeh was once called up to Iran national under-17 football team's camp for 2009 FIFA U-17 World Cup in Kish Island, but never invited again.

About his playing probability in Iran national under-23 football team, Abedzadeh said: "Again, they told me that they wanted to take the players who have been together for a long time and know each other well... They also explained that if we should qualify, they are going to call in and examine new players . So hopefully they can beat Iraq and qualify for the Olympics, and hopefully I'll get my chance then. I think the problem is that I was in England for the past four years and that they weren't able to watch me play as much as the local players. That has been pretty disappointing for me."

Abedzadeh was part of Iran's team for in 2014 AFC U-22 Championship, but he did not play any match. In 2015, he was invited to Olympic team for 2016 AFC U-23 Championship qualification.

=== Senior ===
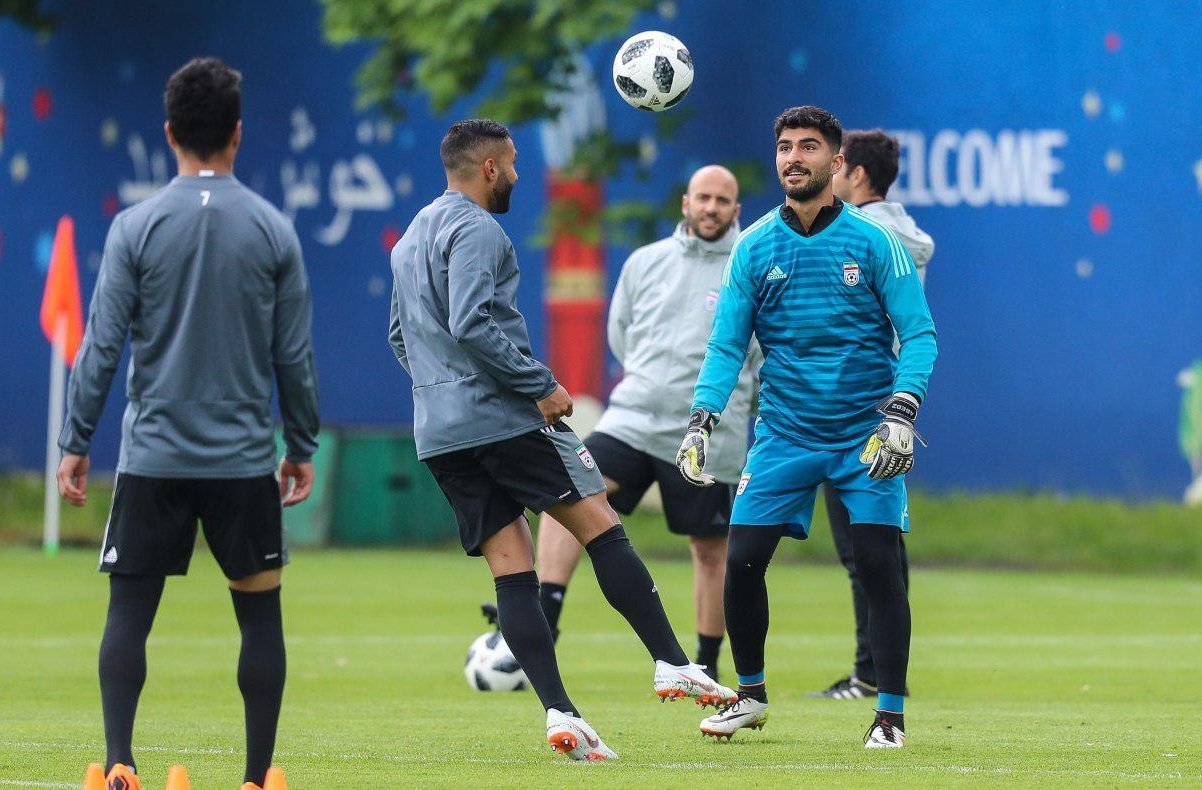
Abedzadeh in training with Iran in 2018 FIFA World Cup

On 5 November 2017, Abedzadeh was called into the Iran national team for the first time for friendlies against Panama and Venezuela. In June 2018, he was named in Iran's final squad for the 2018 FIFA World Cup in Russia. He made his debut against Uzbekistan on 19 May 2018.

== Personal life ==
He is the son of former Iranian national team legendary goalkeeper Ahmad Reza Abedzadeh.

On 11 January 2026, Abedzadeh publicly came out in support of the 2025–2026 Iranian protests, referring to the high death toll of 12,000 protesters as a "genocide".

== Career statistics ==
=== Club ===
As of 30 May 2025

Club	Season	League			National cup		League cup		Total	
Club	Season	Division	Apps	Goals	Apps	Goals	Apps	Goals	Apps	Goals
LA Blues	2011	USL Championship	4	0	—		—		4	0
LA Blues	2012	USL Championship	10	0	—		—		10	0
LA Blues	Total		14	0	—		—		14	0
Persepolis	2012–13	Pro League	0	0	0	0	—		0	0
Persepolis	2013–14	Pro League	0	0	0	0	—		0	0
Persepolis	Total		0	0	0	0	—		0	0
Rah Ahan	2014–15	Pro League	9	0	0	0	—		9	0
Barreirense	2016–17	Campeonato de Portugal	0	0	0	0	1	0	1	0
Marítimo	2017–18	Primeira Liga	8	0	3	0	4	0	15	0
Marítimo	2018–19	Primeira Liga	13	0	0	0	1	0	14	0
Marítimo	2019–20	Primeira Liga	25	0	1	0	0	0	26	0
Marítimo	2020–21	Primeira Liga	29	0	0	0	0	0	29	0
Marítimo	Total		75	0	4	0	5	0	84	0
Ponferradina	2021–22	Segunda División	35	0	0	0	—		35	0
Ponferradina	2022–23	Segunda División	30	0	0	0	—		30	0
Ponferradina	Total		65	0	0	0	—		65	0
Marítimo	2023–24	Liga Portugal 2	17	0	3	0	0	0	20	0
Castellón	2024–25	Segunda División	3	0	2	0	0	0	5	0
Career total			183	0	9	0	6	0	198	0

=== International ===
Statistics accurate as of match played 23 September 2022 .

Iran
Year	Apps	Goals
2018	3	0
2020	1	0
2021	2	0
2022	5	0
Total	11	0

== Honours ==
Persepolis

- Iran Pro League runner-up: 2013–14
- Hazfi Cup runner-up: 2012–13

Iran U-23

- WAFF U-23 Championship: 2015
