= Inter Campus =

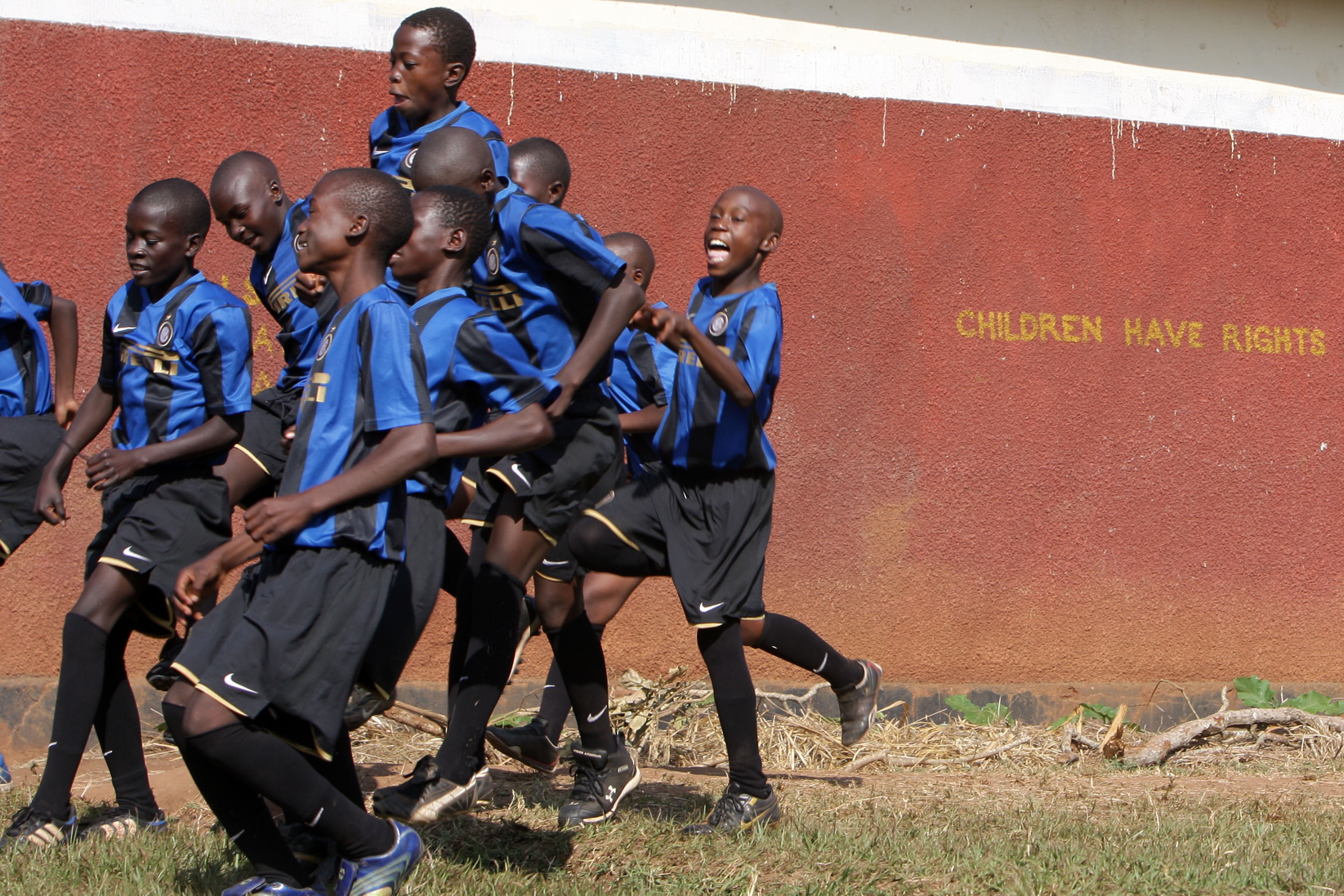
Inter Campus in Uganda, circa 2009

Inter Campus is a social project run by Inter Futura, a charitable arm of FC Inter Milano until 2026. It was founded by the club former president Massimo Moratti on February 20, 1996, with operations starting in 1997.

Born as an expression of the ethical values and of the spirit of brotherhood on which the Club is funded, Inter Campus formalizes flexible and long-term collaboration agreements with selected NGOs and institutions throughout the world and supports their social programs in favor of children in need using football as an educational tool. Together with its Proud Partners, it offers free technical clinics to adults, restores the Right to Play to kids and favors the development of local communities, while respecting their needs and contextual characteristics.

Inter Campus believes that Playing is a Right for every child.

Active in four continents, the program constantly involves thousands of boys and girls aged 6 to 13, as well as hundreds of educators and local volunteers. Inter Campus supports the communities it works in, giving back children the opportunity to play, to develop their personality, to integrate and participate proactively in social life. Every year, each participant receives as a gift the official Inter kit (jersey and short), as a symbol of belonging to the Nerazzurri family.

Due to its social commitment through football, Inter Campus has been invited several times to the United Nations, as role model in terms of sport values adoption in deprived context and for people in need.

The current President of Inter Campus is Carlotta Moratti.
