= List of Iranian football transfers summer 2013 =

This is a list of Iranian football transfers for the 2013 summer transfer window. Transfers of Iran Pro League & Azadegan League are included.

== Rules and regulations ==
The Iranian Football Clubs who participate in 2013–14 Iran Pro League are allowed to have up to maximum 38 players (including up to maximum 4 non-Iranian players) in their player lists, which will be categorized in the following groups:

- Up to maximum 21 adult (without any age limit) players
- Up to maximum 9 under-23 players (i.e. the player whose birth is after 21 March 1990).
- Up to maximum 5 under-21 players (i.e. the player whose birth is after 1 January 1993).
- Up to maximum 3 under-19 players (i.e. the player whose birth is after 1 January 1995).

According to Iran Football Federation rules for 2013-14 Football Season, each Football Club is allowed to take up to maximum 6 new Iranian player from the other clubs who already played in the 2012–13 Iran Pro League season. In addition to these six new players, each club is allowed to take up to maximum 4 non-Iranian new players (at least one of them should be Asian) and up to 3 players from Free agent (who did not play in 2012–13 Iran Pro League season or doesn't list in any 2013–14 League after season's start). In addition to these players, the clubs are also able to take some new under-23, under-21, and under-19 years old players, if they have some free place in these categories in their player lists. under-23 players should sign in transfer window but under-21 & under-19 players can be signed during the first mid-season.

== Iran Pro League ==
=== Damash Gilan ===
In: Note: Flags indicate national team as defined under FIFA eligibility rules; some limited exceptions apply. Players may hold more than one non-FIFA nationality.

No.	Pos.	Nation	Player
26	DF	Iran	Saeid Ghadami (from Persepolis)
27	FW	Iran	Rouhollah Seifollahi ^{PL} (from Persepolis)
14	MF	Iran	Reza Kardoust ^{PL} (from Gahar Zagros)
22	GK	Iran	Habib Dehghani ^{PL} (from Sanat Naft)
77	FW	Iran	Jahangir Asgari ^{PL} (from Rah Ahan Sorinet)
23	FW	Iran	Saeid Mortazavi (Loan Return from Parseh Tehran)
35	FW	Iran	Hamid Khodabandelou (from Esteghlal Khuzestan)

Out: Note: Flags indicate national team as defined under FIFA eligibility rules; some limited exceptions apply. Players may hold more than one non-FIFA nationality.

No.	Pos.	Nation	Player
30	MF	Iran	Alireza Jahanbakhsh (to (Netherlands) N.E.C)
7	MF	Iran	Hossein Ebrahimi (to Naft Tehran)
31	MF	Iran	Alireza Vahedi Nikbakht (to Esteghlal)
17	DF	Iran	Hossein Koushki (to Sanat Naft)
22	GK	Iran	Hassan Roudbarian (to Mes Kerman)
27	MF	Iran	Mohammad Dadresi (Released)
25	MF	Iran	Mohammad Ali Rahimi (Released)
—	MF	Iran	Mohammad Karimi (to Foolad Yazd)

=== Esteghlal ===
In: Note: Flags indicate national team as defined under FIFA eligibility rules; some limited exceptions apply. Players may hold more than one non-FIFA nationality.

No.	Pos.	Nation	Player
20	MF	Iran	Ahmad Jamshidian ^{PL} (from Sepahan)
26	MF	Iran	Fardin Abedini (Loan return from Tractor Sazi)
32	FW	Iran	Mohammad Mehdi Nazari ^{PL} (from Fajr Sepasi)
8	MF	Iran	Pejman Nouri ^{PL} (from Malavan)
11	FW	Iran	Mohammad Ghazi ^{PL} (from Persepolis)
22	MF	Iran	Alireza Vahedi Nikbakht (from Damash)
14	MF	Iran	Andranik Teymourian (from (Qatar) Al-Kharitiyath)
31	MF	Serbia	Goran Lovre (from (Serbia) Partizan)
17	MF	Iran	Hamed Khosravi (from Shahrdari Tabriz)

Out: Note: Flags indicate national team as defined under FIFA eligibility rules; some limited exceptions apply. Players may hold more than one non-FIFA nationality.

No.	Pos.	Nation	Player
38	MF	Bolivia	Vicente Arze (Loan return to (Belgium) Charleroi)
—	MF	Iran	Mehdi Shiri (to Malavan)
12	DF	Iran	Hassan Ashjari (to Malavan)
17	MF	Iran	Maysam Baou (to Tractor Sazi)
40	DF	Iran	Ali Hamoudi (to Sepahan)
36	FW	Iran	Iman Mousavi (to Gostaresh Foolad)
19	MF	Iran	Abbas Mohammadrezaei (to Foolad)
—	MF	Iran	Mohammad Hosseinpour (to Rah Ahan Sorinet)
21	MF	Iran	Armen Tahmasian (Released)
24	FW	Iran	Farzad Hatami (to Foolad)
14	MF	Iran	Kianoush Rahmati (to Saipa)
8	MF	Iran	Mojtaba Jabbari (to Sepahan)
25	FW	Iran	Hojjat Chaharmahali (Released)
26	MF	Iran	Mahdi Eslami (to Shahrdari Bandar Abbas)
35	GK	Iran	Hadi Rishi Esfahani (to Shahrdari Bandar Abbas)
—	FW	Iran	Farhad Gholizadeh (to Sanat Naft)

=== Esteghlal Khuzestan ===
In: Note: Flags indicate national team as defined under FIFA eligibility rules; some limited exceptions apply. Players may hold more than one non-FIFA nationality.

No.	Pos.	Nation	Player
4	DF	Iran	Sohrab Bakhtiarizadeh ^{PL} (from Saba Qom)
1	GK	Iran	Fábio Carvalho ^{PL} (from Paykan)
13	DF	Iran	Hossein Kaabi ^{PL} (from Sanat Naft)
14	MF	Iran	Mehdi Kheiri ^{PL} (from Naft Tehran)
7	FW	Iran	Mehdi Chahkoutahzadeh (from Iranjavan)
16	MF	Iran	Ebrahim Salehi (from Iranjavan)
15	MF	Iran	Karim Shaverdi (from Pas Hamedan)
23	MF	Iran	Iman Mobali ^{PL} (from Paykan)
33	GK	Iran	Ali Akbar Ahaki (from Foolad U21)
40	MF	Iran	Adel Kolahkaj ^{PL} (from Persepolis)
10	FW	Iran	Milad Meydavoodi ^{PL} (from Aluminium Hormozgan)
8	MF	Mali	Idrissa Traoré (from (Mali) Djoliba)
12	DF	Mali	Salif Coulibaly (from (Mali) Djoliba)
19	FW	Iran	Ali Bigdeli (from Esteghlal Ramhormoz)
22	GK	Iran	Parviz Karimi (from Shahrdari Bandar Abbas)
26	DF	Iran	Mohammad Mad Malisi (from Esteghlal Ahvaz)

Out: Note: Flags indicate national team as defined under FIFA eligibility rules; some limited exceptions apply. Players may hold more than one non-FIFA nationality.

No.	Pos.	Nation	Player
16	DF	Iran	Alireza Ebrahimi (to Mes Kerman)
1	GK	Iran	Khaled Shahitavi (Released)
4	DF	Iran	Kousha Bakhtiarizadeh (to Naft Gachsaran)
5	DF	Iran	Mojtaba Zare Mehrjerdi (to Yazd Louleh)
8	MF	Iran	Rouhollah Nemati (Released)
10	FW	Iran	Hamid Khodabandelou (to Damash)
12	GK	Iran	Mohammad Nobegan (Released)
15	MF	Iran	Hassan Yousefi (Released)
19	FW	Iran	Mohammad Abiat (Released)
21	MF	Iran	Aboutaleb Ghanbarizadeh (Released)
22	GK	Iran	Mostafa Mirzaei (to Gahar Zagros)
23	DF	Iran	Mohammad Amin Farajifard (Released)
24	MF	Iran	Shahab Ghanbari (Released)
27	MF	Iran	Mojtaba Babaei (Released)
32	MF	Iran	Saeid Anafcheh (to Badr Hormozgan)
33	GK	Iran	Amin Jahanmehr (Released)
—	MF	Iran	Pouria Darakeh (to Badr Hormozgan)
—	FW	Iran	Mohammad Sarfaraz (to Foolad Novin)
—	DF	Iran	Nabi Saki (to Badr Hormozgan)

=== Fajr Sepasi ===
In: Note: Flags indicate national team as defined under FIFA eligibility rules; some limited exceptions apply. Players may hold more than one non-FIFA nationality.

No.	Pos.	Nation	Player
2	FW	Iran	Hadi Daghagheleh (Loan return from Nirooye Zamini)
15	MF	Iran	Behnam Askarkhani (from Yazd Louleh)
3	DF	Iran	Mostafa Sabri (from Free agent)
8	MF	Iran	Mehrdad Karimian ^{PL} (from Mes Kerman)
10	MF	Iran	Siamak Koohnavard ^{PL} (from Sanat Naft)
19	MF	Iran	Foad Aghaei (from Yazd Louleh)
40	FW	Iran	Mojtaba Zarei ^{PL} (from Aluminium Hormozgan)
44	FW	Iran	Mohammad Heidari ^{PL} (from Malavan)
11	MF	Iran	Mehrzad Madanchi ^{PL} (from Persepolis)
32	DF	Iran	Bahman Maleki (from Zob Ahan)

Out: Note: Flags indicate national team as defined under FIFA eligibility rules; some limited exceptions apply. Players may hold more than one non-FIFA nationality.

No.	Pos.	Nation	Player
29	MF	Iran	Hossein Kazemi (to Aluminium Hormozgan)
3	DF	Iran	Khaled Shafiei (to Gostaresh Foolad)
10	FW	Iran	Mohammad Mehdi Nazari (to Esteghlal)
33	DF	Iran	Mojtaba Tarshiz (to Mes Kerman)
38	FW	Curaçao	Sendley Sidney Bito (Released)
15	FW	Iran	Moslem Firouzabadi (to Aluminium Hormozgan)
2	DF	Iran	Omid Khalili (to Padideh Shandiz)

=== Foolad ===
In: Note: Flags indicate national team as defined under FIFA eligibility rules; some limited exceptions apply. Players may hold more than one non-FIFA nationality.

No.	Pos.	Nation	Player
17	DF	Iran	Abolhassan Jafari ^{PL} (from Sepahan)
5	MF	Iran	Mehdi Badrlou ^{PL} (from Saba Qom)
9	MF	Iran	Abbas Mohammad Rezaei ^{PL} (from Esteghlal)
3	DF	Brazil	Serjão (from (Brazil) Pelotas)
15	MF	Brazil	Leandro Chaves (from (Brazil) Mirassol)
40	FW	Iran	Farzad Hatami ^{PL} (from Esteghlal)

Out: Note: Flags indicate national team as defined under FIFA eligibility rules; some limited exceptions apply. Players may hold more than one non-FIFA nationality.

No.	Pos.	Nation	Player
2	DF	Iran	Kheyrollah Veisi (to Naft Masjed Soleyman)
3	DF	Iran	Mehdi Amirabadi (to Paykan)
9	FW	Iran	Taleb Reykani (to Sanat Naft)
16	FW	Iran	Hakim Nassari (to Naft Masjed Soleyman, previously on loan at Paykan)
25	MF	Iran	Meisam Karimi (to Sanat Naft)
34	MF	Iran	Edris Kouchaki (to Foolad Novin)
37	FW	Iran	Abbas Pourkhosravani (Padideh Shandiz)
7	FW	Iran	Arash Afshin (to Sepahan)
20	DF	Brazil	Leandro Padovani (to (Qatar) Al Rayyan)
38	MF	Brazil	Roberto Neves (Released)
33	GK	Iran	Ali Akbar Ahaki (to Esteghlal Khuzestan)
30	DF	Iran	Vahid Moradi (to Badr Hormozgan)

=== Gostaresh Foolad ===
In: Note: Flags indicate national team as defined under FIFA eligibility rules; some limited exceptions apply. Players may hold more than one non-FIFA nationality.

No.	Pos.	Nation	Player
23	MF	Iran	Rasoul Pirzadeh ^{PL} (from Aluminium Hormozgan)
—	GK	Iran	Davoud Noushi Soufiani (from Shahrdari Tabriz)
4	DF	Iran	Khaled Shafiei ^{PL} (from Naft Tehran)
2	DF	Iran	Mehdi Mohammadpouri (from Shahrdari Tabriz)
1	GK	Iran	Mohsen Forouzan ^{PL} (from Tractor Sazi)
6	MF	Iran	Meysam Naghizadeh ^{PL} (from Persepolis)
33	GK	Iran	Mohammad Nasseri (On Loan from Sepahan)
10	FW	Iran	Iman Mousavi ^{PL} (from Esteghlal)
15	DF	Iran	Mahmoud Khamisi (from Rahian Kermanshah)
31	DF	Iran	Behnam Dadashvand ^{PL} (from Aluminium Hormozgan)
30	MF	Peru	Diego Chávarri (from (Peru) Unión Comercio)
28	FW	Iran	Ali Younesi (from Shahrdari Tabriz)
17	MF	Iran	Mohammad Reza Zeynalkheyri (from Shahrdari Tabriz)

Out: Note: Flags indicate national team as defined under FIFA eligibility rules; some limited exceptions apply. Players may hold more than one non-FIFA nationality.

No.	Pos.	Nation	Player
11	FW	Iran	Mohsen Delir (to Tractor Sazi)
22	GK	Iran	Mehdi Rahimzadeh (to Malavan)
—	GK	Iran	Davoud Noushi Soufiani (On Loan to Tractor Sazi)
33	DF	Iran	Shahriar Shirvand (to Tractor Sazi)
30	MF	Iran	Ehsan Pahlevan (to Zob Ahan, previously on loan)
2	DF	Iran	Hedayat Shahriari (Released)
4	DF	Iran	Alireza Ebadi (Released)
6	DF	Iran	Kaveh Zangian (to PAS Hamedan)
14	FW	Iran	Mohammad Ali Faridi Khatibi (Released)
15	MF	Iran	Ahad Rostami (Released)
17	DF	Iran	Hadi Jafari (Aboomoslem)
18	DF	Iran	Reza Jafari (Released)
19	MF	Iran	Rasoul Alipour (Released)
21	FW	Iran	Saber Mirghorbani (to PAS Hamedan)
23	MF	Iran	Esmaeil Sabzi (Released)
24	DF	Iran	Reza Azizi (Released)
28	DF	Iran	Amir Reza Khodayi (Released)
29	MF	Iran	Milad Kargari (Released)

=== Malavan ===
In: Note: Flags indicate national team as defined under FIFA eligibility rules; some limited exceptions apply. Players may hold more than one non-FIFA nationality.

No.	Pos.	Nation	Player
8	DF	Iran	Hassan Ashjari ^{PL} (from Esteghlal)
2	FW	Iran	Mehdi Daghagheleh ^{PL} (from Sanat Naft)
30	MF	Iran	Mehdi Shiri (from Esteghlal U21)
18	FW	Iran	Esmaeil Samadi (from Sanat Sari)
33	GK	Iran	Mehdi Rahimzadeh (from Gostaresh Foolad)
13	MF	Iran	Mohsen Yousefi ^{PL} (from Naft Tehran)
19	DF	Iran	Morteza Falahati (from Aboomoslem)
3	MF	Iran	Ahmad Mehdizadeh ^{PL} (from Paykan)
21	MF	Croatia	Ivor Weitzer (from (Croatia) Rijeka)
23	MF	Iran	Amir Hossein Feshangchi ^{PL} (from Persepolis)

Out: Note: Flags indicate national team as defined under FIFA eligibility rules; some limited exceptions apply. Players may hold more than one non-FIFA nationality.

No.	Pos.	Nation	Player
18	FW	Iran	Mohammad Nozhati (to Naft Tehran)
11	FW	Iran	Mehrdad Oladi (to Naft Tehran)
7	MF	Iran	Hossein Badamaki (to Padideh Shandiz)
8	MF	Iran	Pejman Nouri (to Esteghlal)
13	FW	Iran	Mohammad Heidari (to Fajr Sepasi)
3	DF	Iran	Hadi Tamini (to Zob Ahan)
4	DF	Iran	Babak Pourgholami (to Aluminium Hormozgan)
1	GK	Iran	Ali Hassani Sefat (to Aluminium Hormozgan)
13	DF	Iran	Javad Shirzad (Released)
20	MF	Iran	Hadi Azizi (Released)
19	DF	Iran	Arash Gholizadeh (to Gahar Zagros)
21	DF	Iran	Mohammad Hosseini (to Aboumoslem)
34	MF	Iran	Shayan Kargar (Released)
12	FW	Iran	Mohammad Hadi Yaghoubi (to Gahar Zagros)

=== Mes Kerman ===
In: Note: Flags indicate national team as defined under FIFA eligibility rules; some limited exceptions apply. Players may hold more than one non-FIFA nationality.

No.	Pos.	Nation	Player
3	DF	Iran	Mojtaba Tarshiz ^{PL} (from Fajr Sepasi)
11	FW	Iran	Karim Eslami ^{PL} (from Saba Qom)
5	DF	Iran	Alireza Ebrahimi (from Esteghlal Khuzestan)
9	MF	Iran	Mahmoud Tighnavard ^{PL} (from Aluminium Hormozgan)
33	GK	Iran	Hassan Roudbarian ^{PL} (from Damash)
30	FW	Brazil	Edinho (from (United Arab Emirates) Al Sharjah)
18	MF	Bosnia and Herzegovina	Samir Bekrić (from (Bosnia and Herzegovina) Željezničar Sarajevo)
34	FW	Iran	Farzad Mohammadi (from Naft Masjed Soleyman)
4	DF	Iran	Esmaeil Mohammad Shirazi (from Naft Masjed Soleyman)
20	DF	Iran	Ebrahim Abarghouei ^{PL} (from Aluminium Hormozgan)
16	MF	Iran	Sajjad Hosseinzadeh (from Padideh Shandiz)
23	DF	Australia	Iain Fyfe (from (Australia) Adelaide United)

Out: Note: Flags indicate national team as defined under FIFA eligibility rules; some limited exceptions apply. Players may hold more than one non-FIFA nationality.

No.	Pos.	Nation	Player
15	DF	Serbia	Stevan Bates (to (Serbia) OFK Beograd)
13	GK	Montenegro	Milan Mijatović (to Zob Ahan)
21	MF	Serbia	Ivan Petrović (to (Thailand) Singhtarua)
18	MF	Iran	Mehrdad Karimian (to Fajr Sepasi)
11	FW	Iran	Reza Enayati (to Saba Qom)
6	DF	Iran	Mehdi Mohammadi (to Saba Qom)
10	FW	Iran	Keivan Amraei (to Saba Qom)
27	FW	Iran	Mansour Tanhaei (to Sanat Naft)
20	MF	Iran	Masoud Nazarzadeh (Padideh Shandiz)
3	DF	Iran	Shoja' Khalilzadeh (to Sepahan)
6	DF	Iran	Jalal Karami (Released)
14	FW	Iran	Hamid Kazemi (to Giti Pasand Isfahan)
25	GK	Iran	Farzin Garousian (to Mes Soongoun Varzaghan)
31	FW	Iran	Ehsan Poursheikhali (Released)

=== Naft Tehran ===
In: Note: Flags indicate national team as defined under FIFA eligibility rules; some limited exceptions apply. Players may hold more than one non-FIFA nationality.

No.	Pos.	Nation	Player
8	MF	Iran	Rasoul Navidkia ^{PL} (from Sanat Naft)
19	DF	Iran	Vahid Amiri (from Naft Masjed Soleyman)
14	MF	Iran	Hamid Bou Hamdan (from Naft Masjed Soleyman)
9	MF	Iran	Hossein Ebrahimi ^{PL} (from Damash Gilan)
18	FW	Iran	Mohammad Nozhati ^{PL} (from Malavan)
11	MF	Iran	Kamal Kamyabinia (from Shahrdari Tabriz)
25	FW	Iran	Ali Ghorbani (from Padideh Shandiz)
17	DF	Iran	Bahram Dabbagh (from Paykan)
7	FW	Iran	Mehrdad Oladi ^{PL} (from Malavan)
30	GK	Iran	Ali Mohsenzadeh (from Zob Ahan)
4	MF	Iran	Ali Nourian (from Saipa Shomal)

Out: Note: Flags indicate national team as defined under FIFA eligibility rules; some limited exceptions apply. Players may hold more than one non-FIFA nationality.

No.	Pos.	Nation	Player
29	FW	Croatia	Goran Ljubojević (to (Croatia) Osijek)
19	FW	Brazil	Mario Ramos (Released)
17	MF	Brazil	Magno Batista (Released)
8	MF	Iran	Yaghoub Karimi (to Sepahan)
4	MF	Iran	Meisam Aghababaei (to Foolad Yazd)
20	MF	Iran	Mohsen Yousefi (to Malavan)
3	DF	Iran	Hadi Shakouri (to Padideh Shandiz)
9	MF	Iran	Mostafa Seifi (Released)
11	FW	Iran	Amin Manouchehri (to Rah Ahan Sorinet)
33	MF	Iran	Mohammad Mansouri (to Aboomoslem)
14	MF	Iran	Mehdi Kheiri (to Esteghlal Khuzestan)
16	DF	Iran	Meysam Hosseini (to Persepolis)
1	GK	Iran	Hamed Fallahzadeh (to Rah Ahan Sorinet)
15	MF	Iran	Rahim Mehdi Zohaivi (to Sanat Naft)
28	MF	Iran	Hamid Taherifard (to Sanat Naft)
7	MF	Iran	Mohammad Hossein Mehrazma (to Padideh Shandiz)
24	MF	Iran	Milad Kermani Moghadam (to Paykan)
—	DF	Iran	Azad Dini (to Nirouye Zamini)
—	MF	Iran	Mehrdad Solhi (from Padideh Shandiz)

=== Persepolis ===
In: Note: Flags indicate national team as defined under FIFA eligibility rules; some limited exceptions apply. Players may hold more than one non-FIFA nationality.

No.	Pos.	Nation	Player
7	MF	Iran	Hamidreza Aliasgari (Loan return from Rah Ahan Sorinet)
17	FW	Iran	Younes Shakeri (from Aboumoslem)
33	FW	Iran	Mohammad Abbaszadeh (from Nassaji)
22	MF	Iran	Milad Gharibi (from Saipa)
18	MF	Iran	Mehrdad Kafshgari ^{PL} (from Rah Ahan Sorinet)
12	DF	Iran	Meysam Hosseini ^{PL} (from Naft Tehran)
23	FW	Iran	Mehdi Seyed-Salehi ^{PL} (from Tractor Sazi)
2	MF	Iran	Omid Alishah (from Rah Ahan Sorinet)
11	MF	Iran	Payam Sadeghian (from Zob Ahan)
5	MF	Iran	Ghasem Dehnavi ^{PL} (from Tractor Sazi)
8	MF	Montenegro	Marko Šćepanović (from (Montenegro) FK Mladost Podgorica)
28	MF	Iran	Milad Kamandani (from Moghavemat Tehran U21)
25	DF	Iran	Farshad Ghasemi (from Moghavemat Tehran U21)
88	GK	Iran	Alireza Haghighi (On Loan from (Russia) Rubin Kazan)
99	FW	Iran	Mohammad Reza Khalatbari (from (United Arab Emirates) Ajman)

Out: Note: Flags indicate national team as defined under FIFA eligibility rules; some limited exceptions apply. Players may hold more than one non-FIFA nationality.

No.	Pos.	Nation	Player
2	MF	Iran	Mehdi Mahdavikia (Retired)
8	MF	Iran	Ali Karimi (to Tractor Sazi)
39	MF	Iran	Adel Kolahkaj (to Esteghlal Khuzestan)
18	MF	Iran	Meysam Naghizadeh (to Gostaresh Foolad)
11	FW	Iran	Mohammad Ghazi (to Esteghlal)
19	MF	Iran	Saeid Ghadami (to Damash)
27	FW	Iran	Rouhollah Seifollahi (to Damash)
32	FW	Iran	Farshad Ahmadzadeh (on loan at Tractor Sazi)
28	GK	Iran	Masoud Dastani (Released)
23	MF	Iran	Amir Hossein Feshangchi (to Malavan)
22	MF	Iran	Mehrzad Madanchi (to Fajr Sepasi)
17	MF	North Macedonia	Vlatko Grozdanoski (to (North Macedonia) FK Vardar)
29	MF	Serbia	Marko Perović (to (Serbia) OFK Beograd)
9	FW	Iran	Karim Ansarifard (on loan at Tractor Sazi)
15	DF	Iran	Roozbeh Cheshmi (to Saba Qom)
15	DF	Iran	Hossein Kanaani (on loan at (Portugal) Beira-Mar)
31	MF	Iran	Afshin Esmaeilzadeh (on loan at (Portugal) Beira-Mar)
—	FW	Iran	Mobin Mirdoroughi (to Paykan)

=== Rah Ahan Sorinet ===
In: Note: Flags indicate national team as defined under FIFA eligibility rules; some limited exceptions apply. Players may hold more than one non-FIFA nationality.

No.	Pos.	Nation	Player
99	MF	Iran	Milad Nouri ^{PL} (from Saba Qom)
27	DF	Iran	Ramin Rezaian ^{PL} (from Saba Qom)
30	GK	Iran	Vahid Taleblou (from Free agent)
80	FW	Iran	Reza Khaleghifar ^{PL} (from Sanat Naft)
16	FW	Iran	Ali Alipour (from Yazd Louleh)
18	FW	Iran	Behnam Barzay (from Sanat Naft)
1	GK	Iran	Hamed Fallahzadeh ^{PL} (from Naft Tehran)
11	FW	Iran	Amin Manouchehri ^{PL} (from Naft Tehran)
28	MF	Iran	Mohammad Hosseinpour (from Esteghlal U21)
23	DF	Iran	Hamed Zamani (from Rahian Kermanshah)
15	DF	Iran	Iman Shirazi (from Zob Ahan)
19	DF	Armenia	Valeri Aleksanyan ^{PL} (from Sanat Naft)
90	FW	Iran	Akbar Saghiri (from Machine Sazi)
13	MF	Brazil	Marcos Bonfim (from (Portugal) Feirense)

Out: Note: Flags indicate national team as defined under FIFA eligibility rules; some limited exceptions apply. Players may hold more than one non-FIFA nationality.

No.	Pos.	Nation	Player
19	DF	Iran	Nader Hooshyar (to PAS Hamedan)
11	FW	Brazil	Igor Castro (Released)
28	FW	Iran	Alireza Abbasfard (to Aluminium Hormozgan)
14	MF	Iran	Mohammad Reza Mamani (Released)
22	GK	Iran	Mohammad Mohammadi (to (United States) Los Angeles Blues)
24	MF	Iran	Mehrdad Kafshgari (to Persepolis)
18	MF	Iran	Hamidreza Aliasgari (Loan return to Persepolis)
2	MF	Iran	Omid Alishah (to Persepolis)
16	FW	Iran	Jahangir Asgari (to Damash)
1	GK	Iran	Farshid Karimi (Released)
26	DF	Iran	Milad Shahbaz Tahmasebi (Released)
12	MF	Iran	Behshad Yavarzadeh (to Paykan)
15	DF	Iran	Amir Tahmouresi (Released)
4	DF	Iran	Mirhani Hashemi (to Padideh Shandiz)
30	GK	Iran	Alireza Heidari (to Padideh Shandiz)
23	MF	Iran	Mohammad Hassan Rajabzadeh (to Padideh Shandiz)

=== Saba Qom ===
In: Note: Flags indicate national team as defined under FIFA eligibility rules; some limited exceptions apply. Players may hold more than one non-FIFA nationality.

No.	Pos.	Nation	Player
10	FW	Iran	Reza Enayati ^{PL} (from Mes Kerman)
33	GK	Iran	Shahram Mehraban ^{PL} (from Gahar Zagros)
18	DF	Iran	Mahmoud Shafiei (from Gahar Zagros)
3	DF	Iran	Mehdi Mohammadi ^{PL} (from Mes Kerman)
24	MF	Iran	Hamed Pouromrani (from Gahar Zagros)
23	FW	Iran	Keivan Amraei ^{PL} (from Mes Kerman)
26	DF	Iran	Roozbeh Cheshmi (from Persepolis U21)
32	DF	Iran	Ali Goudarzi (from Zob Ahan)
27	MF	Iran	Nima Zand (from Free agent)
21	GK	Iran	Mohsen Ahmadi (from Saipa Mehr Karaj)
31		Iran	Hadi Ali Zamani (from unknown)

Out: Note: Flags indicate national team as defined under FIFA eligibility rules; some limited exceptions apply. Players may hold more than one non-FIFA nationality.

No.	Pos.	Nation	Player
9	MF	Iran	Milad Nouri (to Rah Ahan Sorinet)
27	DF	Iran	Ramin Rezaian (to Rah Ahan Sorinet)
1	GK	Iran	Hamed Lak (to Tractor Sazi)
5	DF	Iran	Sohrab Bakhtiarizadeh (to Esteghlal Khuzestan)
6	MF	Iran	Mehdi Badrlou (to Foolad)
12	MF	Cameroon	David Wirikom (Loan Return to Rahian Kermanshah)
18	FW	Iran	Karim Eslami (to Mes Kerman)
10	FW	Iran	Mohsen Khalili (Released)
15	DF	Iran	Meysam Khosravi (to Aboomoslem)
24	FW	Iran	Iman Razaghirad (to Paykan)
19	FW	Iran	Bahman Tahmasebi (to Padideh Shandiz)
21	GK	Iran	Alireza Ghadiri (to Paykan)
40	GK	Iran	Mohammadreza Vafaei (Released)
26	DF	Iran	Saeed Sadeghi (Released)
33	MF	Iran	Hossein Maleki (Released)

=== Saipa ===
In: Note: Flags indicate national team as defined under FIFA eligibility rules; some limited exceptions apply. Players may hold more than one non-FIFA nationality.

No.	Pos.	Nation	Player
3	MF	Iran	Mehdi Jafarpour ^{PL} (from Sepahan)
40	FW	Iran	Babak Hatami (from Shahrdari Tabriz)
34	MF	Iran	Reza Nasehi ^{PL} (from Aluminium Hormozgan)
19	DF	Iran	Sajjad Moshkelpour ^{PL} (from Sanat Naft)
12	GK	Iran	Mehdi Sabeti ^{PL} (from Tractor Sazi)
9	FW	Iran	Meghdad Ghobakhlou (from Pas Hamedan)
25	DF	Iran	Milad Nosrati (from Parseh)
17	FW	Romania	Cosmin Vancea (from (Romania) Oțelul Galați)
14	MF	Iran	Kianoush Rahmati ^{PL} (from Esteghlal)
1	GK	Iran	Mohammad Bagher Sadeghi ^{PL} (from Sepahan)
15	MF	Iran	Davoud Shahvaraghi (from Saipa U21)
22	MF	Iran	Milad Bakhtiari (from Saipa U21)

Out: Note: Flags indicate national team as defined under FIFA eligibility rules; some limited exceptions apply. Players may hold more than one non-FIFA nationality.

No.	Pos.	Nation	Player
22	FW	Iran	Milad Gharibi (to Persepolis)
17	DF	Brazil	Márcio Alemão (Released)
28	MF	Brazil	Junior Toretta (Released)
1	GK	Iran	Rahman Ahmadi (to Sepahan)
10	FW	Iran	Saeid Daghighi (to Tractor Sazi)
3	MF	Iran	Hassan Eslami (to Parseh Tehran)
24	MF	Iran	Vahid Barati (to Giti Pasand Isfahan)
11	FW	Iran	Babak Latifi (to Paykan)
31	GK	Iran	Hamid Lotfollahnejad (to Sanat Naft)
6	DF	Iran	Kazem Borjlou (to Paykan)
25	MF	Iran	Sina Abdi (to Saipa Shomal)
2	MF	Iran	Saeid Norouzi (to Mes Soongoun Varzaghan)

=== Sepahan ===
In: Note: Flags indicate national team as defined under FIFA eligibility rules; some limited exceptions apply. Players may hold more than one non-FIFA nationality.

No.	Pos.	Nation	Player
88	MF	Iran	Yaghoub Karimi ^{PL} (from Naft Tehran)
1	GK	Iran	Rahman Ahmadi ^{PL} (from Saipa)
40	DF	Iran	Ali Hamoudi ^{PL} (from Esteghlal)
5	DF	Iran	Hadi Aghili (from Qatar SC)
19	DF	Iran	Ali Gholami (from Sepahan U21)
3	DF	Iran	Shoja' Khalilzadeh ^{PL} (from Mes Kerman)
10	FW	Iran	Arash Afshin ^{PL} (from Foolad)
8	MF	Iran	Mojtaba Jabbari ^{PL} (from Esteghlal)
33	DF	Iran	Saeed Ghaedifar (from Sepahan U21)
29	DF	Iran	Ahmad Eskandari (from Sepahan U21)

Out: Note: Flags indicate national team as defined under FIFA eligibility rules; some limited exceptions apply. Players may hold more than one non-FIFA nationality.

No.	Pos.	Nation	Player
20	MF	Iran	Ahmad Jamshidian (to Esteghlal)
9	MF	Iran	Mehdi Jafarpour (to Saipa)
17	DF	Iran	Abolhassan Jafari (to Foolad)
24	MF	Iran	Akbar Imani (to Zob Ahan)
30	GK	Iran	Mohammad Nasseri (On Loan at Gostaresh Foolad)
1	GK	Iran	Mohammad-Bagher Sadeghi (to Saipa)
3	DF	Iran	Farshid Talebi (to Tractor Sazi)
6	DF	Australia	Milan Susak (to (United Arab Emirates) Al Wasl)
33	FW	Iran	Mohammad Reza Khalatbari (to (United Arab Emirates) Ajman)

=== Tractor Sazi ===
In: Note: Flags indicate national team as defined under FIFA eligibility rules; some limited exceptions apply. Players may hold more than one non-FIFA nationality.

No.	Pos.	Nation	Player
1	GK	Iran	Hamed Lak ^{PL} (from Saba Qom)
21	FW	Iran	Mohsen Delir (from Gostaresh Foolad)
17	MF	Iran	Maysam Baou ^{PL} (from Esteghlal)
10	FW	Iran	Saeid Daghighi ^{PL} (from Saipa)
8	MF	Iran	Ali Karimi ^{PL} (from Persepolis)
22	GK	Iran	Davoud Noushi Soufiani (On Loan from Gostaresh Foolad)
27	FW	Iran	Farshad Ahmadzadeh (On Loan from Persepolis)
23	DF	Iran	Mohsen Rabikhah (from Pas Hamedan)
16	DF	Iran	Shahriar Shirvand (from Gostaresh Foolad)
4	DF	Iran	Farshid Talebi ^{PL} (from Sepahan)
11	FW	Iran	Karim Ansarifard ^{PL} (On Loan from Persepolis)
77	MF	Serbia	Marko Bašara (from (Bosnia and Herzegovina) Radnik Bijeljina)

Out: Note: Flags indicate national team as defined under FIFA eligibility rules; some limited exceptions apply. Players may hold more than one non-FIFA nationality.

No.	Pos.	Nation	Player
5	MF	Iran	Ghasem Dehnavi (to Persepolis)
12	GK	Iran	Mehdi Sabeti (to Saipa)
40	GK	Iran	Agil Etemadi (to (Netherlands) Alemere City)
16	DF	Iran	Mostafa Ekrami (to Zob Ahan)
3	MF	Iran	Fardin Abedini (Loan return to Esteghlal)
23	FW	Iran	Mehdi Seyed-Salehi (to Persepolis)
1	GK	Iran	Mohsen Forouzan (to Gostaresh Foolad)
25	FW	Brazil	Jhonatan Pereira (Released)
17	MF	Iran	Alireza Jalili (Released)
18	FW	Brazil	Geílson Soares (Released)
10	MF	Portugal	Flávio Paixão (Released)

=== Zob Ahan ===
In: Note: Flags indicate national team as defined under FIFA eligibility rules; some limited exceptions apply. Players may hold more than one non-FIFA nationality.

No.	Pos.	Nation	Player
23	FW	Iran	Rouhollah Arab ^{PL} (from Sanat Naft)
32	DF	Iran	Mostafa Ekrami ^{PL} (from Tractor Sazi)
31	DF	Iran	Oveis Kordjahan (from Pas Hamedan)
18	MF	Iran	Vahid Aliabadi (from Pas Hamedan)
29	MF	Iran	Morteza Tabrizi (from Pas Hamedan)
5	DF	Iran	Hadi Tamini ^{PL} (from Malavan)
14	MF	Iran	Milad Zeneyedpour ^{PL} (from Paykan)
4	MF	Iran	Akbar Imani (from Sepahan)
15	MF	Iran	Ehsan Pahlevan (from Gostaresh Foolad, Previously on loan)
26	GK	Montenegro	Milan Mijatović (from Mes Kerman)

Out: Note: Flags indicate national team as defined under FIFA eligibility rules; some limited exceptions apply. Players may hold more than one non-FIFA nationality.

No.	Pos.	Nation	Player
18	MF	Iran	Ehsan Pahlevan (Loan return to Gostaresh Foolad)
9	FW	Iran	Payam Sadeghian (to Persepolis)
23	FW	Ivory Coast	Ismaël Fofana (Loan return to (Armenia) Shirak)
28	DF	Iran	Iman Shirazi (to Rah Ahan Sorinet)
25	MF	Iran	Mohammad Sadegh Barani (to Paykan)
29	MF	Iran	Amir Hosein Pouzesh (Released)
24	DF	Iran	Ali Goudarzi (to Saba Qom)
5	DF	Iran	Alireza Jarahkar (to Paykan)
38	GK	Iran	Ali Mohsenzadeh (to Naft Tehran)
31	DF	Iran	Mohammad Borjlou (to Paykan)
14	MF	Iran	Alireza Haddadifar (Released)
32	DF	Iran	Bahman Maleki (to Fajr Sepasi)
4	DF	Iran	Hamid Shafaat (to Giti Pasand Isfahan)

== Azadegan League ==
=== Aboomoslem ===
In: Note: Flags indicate national team as defined under FIFA eligibility rules; some limited exceptions apply. Players may hold more than one non-FIFA nationality.

No.	Pos.	Nation	Player
11	FW	Iran	Amir Mohebi (from Shahrdari Tabriz)
8	MF	Iran	Mostafa Tayyebi (from Shahid Mansouri Gharchak FSC)
2	DF	Iran	Mohammad Hosseini (from Malavan)
1	GK	Iran	Mehrdad Bashagerdi (from Sanat Naft)
6	DF	Iran	Meysam Khosravi (from Saba Qom)
9	MF	Iran	Mehdi Kiani (from Sanat Naft)
10	FW	Iran	Ali Molaei (from Shahrdari Tabriz)
3	DF	Iran	Mostafa Bijani (from Melli Hafari Ahvaz)
14	FW	Iran	Mohammad Ahmadpouri (from Iranjavan)
15	MF	Iran	Mohammad Faal (from Foolad Yazd)
16	MF	Iran	Mohammad Mansouri (from Naft Tehran)
17	DF	Iran	Hadi Jafari (from Gostaresh Foolad)
19	DF	Iran	Bijan Koushki (from Free agent)
23	MF	Iran	Hamidreza Sharafi (from Shahrdari Arak)
26	MF	Iran	Jamil Zobeydi (from Esteghlal Ahvaz)

Out: Note: Flags indicate national team as defined under FIFA eligibility rules; some limited exceptions apply. Players may hold more than one non-FIFA nationality.

No.	Pos.	Nation	Player
10	FW	Iran	Younes Shakeri (to Persepolis)
16	DF	Iran	Morteza Falahati (to Malavan)
23	MF	Iran	Javad Zeyghami (to Sanat Naft)
3	DF	Iran	Morteza Gholamalitabar (to Sanat Naft)
17	MF	Iran	Mohsen Azarbad (to Sanat Naft)
7	MF	Iran	Mohammad Mansouri (to Padideh Shandiz)
12	GK	Iran	Omid Gholami (to Padideh Shandiz)
33	MF	Iran	Meisam Rezapour (to Padideh Shandiz)
11	FW	Iran	Hadi Asghari (to Esteghlal Ahvaz)
13	DF	Iran	Saeid Fatemi (to Shahrdari Bandar Abbas)
26	FW	Iran	Behnam Beiranvand (to Siah Jamegan Khorasan)
8	MF	Iran	Majid Noormohammadi (to Padideh Shandiz)
2	DF	Iran	Mohsen Neysani (to Esteghlal Ahvaz)
20	MF	Iran	Hojat Zadmahmoud (to Esteghlal Ahvaz)
1	GK	Iran	Hossein Hooshyar (to Gahar Zagros)
9	MF	Iran	Saeid Ganji (Released)
5	DF	Iran	Rasoul Kor (to Badr Hormozgan)
15	MF	Iran	Reza Otaghi (Released)
18	FW	Iran	Ahmad Moghadaspour (Released)
19	DF	Iran	Sajjad Ahmadi (Released)
31	MF	Iran	Sasan Rajabzadeh (Released)
32	MF	Iran	Nasser Abbasi (Released)

=== Aluminium Hormozgan ===
In: Note: Flags indicate national team as defined under FIFA eligibility rules; some limited exceptions apply. Players may hold more than one non-FIFA nationality.

No.	Pos.	Nation	Player
4	DF	Iran	Babak Pourgholami (from Malavan)
23	MF	Iran	Mohammad Reza Pourmohammad (from Padideh Shandiz)
77	FW	Iran	Alireza Abbasfard (from Rah Ahan Sorinet)
14	MF	Iran	Hossein Kazemi (from Fajr Sepasi)
30	FW	Iran	Ehsan Abdi (from Nassaji Mazandaran)
16	MF	Iran	Ali Reza Latifi (from Shahrdari Tabriz)
5	DF	Iran	Mehran Farziat (from Shahrdari Tabriz)
37	FW	Iran	Moslem Firouzabadi (from Fajr Sepasi)
40	MF	Iran	Reza Maghouli (from Paykan)
1	GK	Iran	Ali Hassani Sefat (from Malavan)
7	MF	Iran	Morteza Hashemizadeh (from Shahrdari Tabriz)
12	MF	Iran	AHmad Jafari (from PAS Hamedan)
15	MF	Iran	Ali Matouri (from PAS Hamedan)
9	MF	Iran	Shahin Majidi (from Shahrdari Bandar Abbas)
3	DF	Iran	Milad Ahmadi (from Alvand Hamedan)
21	DF	Iran	Esmaeil Vahedi (from Shahrdari Bandar Abbas)
—	MF	Iran	Alireza Zandavi (from Yadavaran Shalamcheh)

Out: Note: Flags indicate national team as defined under FIFA eligibility rules; some limited exceptions apply. Players may hold more than one non-FIFA nationality.

No.	Pos.	Nation	Player
30	FW	Iran	Mojtaba Zarei (to Fajr Sepasi)
9	MF	Iran	Reza Nasehi (to Saipa)
10	MF	Iran	Mahmoud Tighnavard (to Mes Kerman)
23	MF	Iran	Rasoul Pirzadeh (to Gostaresh Foolad)
40	FW	Iran	Milad Meydavoodi (to Esteghlal Khuzestan)
13	DF	Iran	Behnam Dadashvand (to Gostaresh Foolad)
12	FW	Libya	Éamon Zayed (to (Republic of Ireland) Shamrock Rovers)
5	DF	Iran	Ebrahim Abarghouei (to Mes Kerman)
2	DF	Iran	Mohsen Hamidi (to Sanat Naft)
1	GK	Iran	Mojtaba Roshangar (to Padideh Shandiz)
7	MF	Iran	Amjad Shokouh Magham (to Padideh Shandiz)
15	DF	Syria	Mohammed Estanbeli (Released)
35	MF	Bosnia and Herzegovina	Riad Demić (Released)
27	FW	Iran	Mehrdad Avakh (to Shahrdari Bandar Abbas)
33	GK	Iran	Ami Zafarnia (Released)
25	FW	Iran	Amir Khalifeh Asl (to Shahrdari Bandar Abbas)
19	MF	Iran	Mehdi Seifi (to PAS Hamedan)
21	MF	Iran	Mehdi Mohammadzadeh (to Foolad Yazd)
—	MF	Iran	Behtash Misaghian (to Padideh Shandiz)
3	DF	Iran	Vahid Asgari (to Padideh Shandiz)
18	FW	Iran	Pouya Khavarpour (to Nassaji Mazandaran)

=== Alvand Hamedan ===
In: Note: Flags indicate national team as defined under FIFA eligibility rules; some limited exceptions apply. Players may hold more than one non-FIFA nationality.

No.	Pos.	Nation	Player
9	FW	Iran	Ghasem Akbari (from Etka)
5	DF	Iran	Javad Rahimi (from Etka)
10	MF	Iran	Morteza Aziz-Mohammadi (from Yazd Louleh)
16	FW	Iran	Pouria Aria Kia (from Free agent)
11	MF	Iran	Rouhollah Abdollahi (from Etka)
40	GK	Iran	Hamed Riahi (from Free agent)
6	DF	Iran	Mojtaba Ensafi (from Yazd Louleh)
24	DF	Iran	Mehdi Fathizadeh (from Free agent)
13	MF	Iran	Majid Jalalpour (from Mehr Hamedan)

Out: Note: Flags indicate national team as defined under FIFA eligibility rules; some limited exceptions apply. Players may hold more than one non-FIFA nationality.

No.	Pos.	Nation	Player
11	MF	Iran	Mostafa Gheisari (to PAS Hamedan)
6	DF	Iran	Iraj Lotfi (Released)
40	MF	Iran	Mehdi Rafiei (to Foolad Yazd)
15	MF	Iran	Mehran Jafari (to Gahar Zagros)
9	FW	Iran	Hamed Mirzaei (Released)
13	DF	Iran	Rasoul Belaghi (Released)
30	MF	Iran	Ahmad Saeidi (to Mes Rafsanjan)
33	GK	Iran	Iman Rezaei (to Yazd Louleh)
34	MF	Iran	Aren Ghazarian (Released)
—	MF	Iran	Masoud Abtahi (Released)
—	MF	Iran	Alireza Karami (Released)
5	DF	Iran	Milad Ahmadi (to Aluminium Hormozgan)

=== Badr Hormozgan ===
In: Note: Flags indicate national team as defined under FIFA eligibility rules; some limited exceptions apply. Players may hold more than one non-FIFA nationality.

No.	Pos.	Nation	Player
40	DF	Iran	Rasoul Kor (from Aboomoslem)
4	MF	Iran	Rahim Rahimi (from Shahrdari Yasuj)
7	MF	Iran	Saeid Anafcheh (from Esteghlal Khuzestan)
13	MF	Iran	Pouria Darakeh (from Esteghlal Khuzestan)
17	DF	Iran	Nabi Saki (from Esteghlal Khuzestan)
10	FW	Iran	Issa Ale Kasir (from Paykan)
31	GK	Iran	Mahyar Hassannejad (from Esteghlal Ahvaz)
27	DF	Iran	Saber Mohammadi (from Gahar Zagros)
15	MF	Iran	Ramin Ghorbani (from Naft Masjed Soleyman)
9	MF	Iran	Omid Abolhassani (from Free agent)
20	DF	Iran	Vahid Moradi (from Foolad)
8	DF	Iran	Ali Ashourizad (from Nassaji Mazandaran)

Out: Note: Flags indicate national team as defined under FIFA eligibility rules; some limited exceptions apply. Players may hold more than one non-FIFA nationality.

No.	Pos.	Nation	Player

=== Esteghlal Ahvaz ===
In: Note: Flags indicate national team as defined under FIFA eligibility rules; some limited exceptions apply. Players may hold more than one non-FIFA nationality.

No.	Pos.	Nation	Player
10	FW	Iran	Hadi Asghari (from Aboomoslem)
33	MF	Iran	Mohammad Sadegh Karami (from Padideh Shandiz)
1	GK	Iran	Peyman Shamlou (from Padideh Shandiz)
25	MF	Iran	Mehdi Shiri (from Bargh Shiraz)
3	DF	Iran	Mohammad Assar Hassani (from Padideh Shandiz)
5	MF	Iran	Ali Marzban (from Padideh Shandiz)
8	MF	Iran	Mansour Tohidianpour (from Padideh Shandiz)
9	FW	Iran	Reza Taheri (from Paykan)
11	FW	Iran	Behnam Afsheh (from Padideh Shandiz)
12	FW	Iran	Kaveh Mokhtari (from Yadavaran Shalamcheh)
14	MF	Iran	Ali Akbar Farhang (from Free agent)
15	DF	Iran	Mohsen Neysani (from Aboumoslem)
16	MF	Iran	Mohsen Ghaedpouri (from Shahin Bushehr)
17	DF	Iran	Peyman Shirzadi (from Padideh Shandiz)
19	MF	Iran	Behnam Farahani (from Padideh Shandiz)
20	FW	Iran	Javad Molaei (from Padideh Shandiz)
21	MF	Iran	Hojat Zadmahmoud (from Aboumoslem)
22	GK	Iran	Rouzbeh Sinaki (from Padideh Shandiz)
28	DF	Iran	Mohsen Mirabi (from Nassaji Mazandaran)
40	FW	Iran	Hassan Najafi (from Padideh Shandiz)

Out: Note: Flags indicate national team as defined under FIFA eligibility rules; some limited exceptions apply. Players may hold more than one non-FIFA nationality.

No.	Pos.	Nation	Player
3	DF	Iran	Mohammad Mad Malisi (to Esteghlal Khuzestan)
6	DF	Iran	Reza Jalali (to Nassaji)
—		Iran	Milad Pakparvar (Released)
1	GK	Iran	Taleb Sharifi (Released)
5	DF	Iran	Mohsen Amini (to Gahar Zagros)
7	MF	Iran	Jamil Zobeydi (to Aboomoslem)
8	MF	Iran	Alireza Shadkam (Released)
9	FW	Iran	Samer Sayyar (Released)
12	MF	Iran	Abdollah Mombeyni (to Shahrdari Bandar Abbas)
13	DF	Iran	Hadi Sharifi (Released)
15	MF	Iran	Alvan Zoveydavi (Released)
18	DF	Iran	Jamal Mousavi (Released)
20	DF	Iran	Hossein Changlavayi (Released)
22	GK	Iran	Hadi Tayyeb Faryan (Released)
24	MF	Iran	Shahab Shahdadnejad (to Gol Gohar)
25	DF	Iran	Milad Rabbanifard (to Nirooye Zamini)
31	GK	Iran	Mahyar Hassannejad (to Badr Hormozgan)
32	DF	Iran	Mehdi Chamanara (Released)
33	MF	Iran	Ali Abbaszadeh (to Parseh Tehran)

=== Foolad Yazd ===
In: Note: Flags indicate national team as defined under FIFA eligibility rules; some limited exceptions apply. Players may hold more than one non-FIFA nationality.

No.	Pos.	Nation	Player
3	DF	Iran	Hadi Rekabi (from Yazd Louleh)
6	MF	Iran	Mehdi Rafiei (from Alvand Hamedan)
11	MF	Iran	Mehdi Mohammadzadeh (from Aluminium Hormozgan)
40	MF	Iran	Sepehr Mir Mohammad Sadegh (from Parseh Tehran)
14	MF	Iran	Meisam Aghababaei (from Naft Tehran)
15	FW	Iran	Ahmad Hayatmanesh (from Bargh Shiraz)
18	MF	Iran	Mohammad Karimi (from Damash)
2	MF	Iran	Mohammadreza Nik Nahal (from Free agent)
20	FW	Iran	Baba Mohammadi (from Paykan)
24	MF	Iran	Jalal Abdi (from Yazd Louleh)
27	MF	Iran	Babak Moradi (from Parseh Tehran)

Out: Note: Flags indicate national team as defined under FIFA eligibility rules; some limited exceptions apply. Players may hold more than one non-FIFA nationality.

No.	Pos.	Nation	Player
21	GK	Iran	Sirous Sangchouli (to Siah Jamegan Khorasan)
20	DF	Iran	Omid Khouraj (to PAS Hamedan)
33	GK	Iran	Mostafa Salehi (to Shahrdari Bandar Abbas)
—	FW	Iran	Iman Nematpour (to Siah Jamegan Khorasan)
—	DF	Iran	Mohammad Kouti (to Naft Masjed Soleyman)
11	MF	Iran	Alireza Beyk Zavieh (to Yazd Louleh)
—	MF	Iran	Mehdi Tayefi (to Yazd Louleh)
22	GK	Iran	Hekmat Fooladpour (to Gol Gohar)
8	MF	Iran	Mehdi Peykani (to Niroye Zamini)
—	MF	Iran	Mohammad Faal (to Aboomoslem)
—	MF	Iran	Ali Akbar Vizvari (Released)
3	DF	Iran	Ali Jahanian (Released)
15	MF	Iran	Amin Zare (Released)
16	MF	Iran	Davoud Azimi (Released)
24	MF	Iran	Hossein Taherinejad (Released)
26	DF	Iran	Alireza Jadidi (Released)
27	FW	Iran	Mohammad Firouzzadeh (Released)
35	GK	Iran	Mohammadreza Ghodratipour (to Rah Ahan)

=== Gahar Zagros ===
In: Note: Flags indicate national team as defined under FIFA eligibility rules; some limited exceptions apply. Players may hold more than one non-FIFA nationality.

No.	Pos.	Nation	Player
1	GK	Iran	Mostafa Mirzaei (from Esteghlal Khuzestan)
2	DF	Iran	Arash Gholizadeh (from Malavan)
3	DF	Iran	Hamid Nemati (from Etka)
4	DF	Iran	Mehdi Shokouhi (from Shahrdari Arak)
5	DF	Iran	Mohsen Amini (from Esteghlal Ahvaz)
6	MF	Iran	Hossein Ahmadlou (from Yazd Louleh)
7	MF	Iran	Moein Nezam Eslami (from Etka)
9	MF	Iran	Mehran Jafari (from Alvand Hamedan)
11	FW	Iran	Mohammad Hadi Yaghoubi (from Malavan)
13	MF	Iran	Abolfazl Kamani (from Shahin Bushehr)
16	FW	Iran	Amir Abi (from Yazd Louleh)
17	MF	Iran	Hamed Basiri (from Yazd Louleh)
21	MF	Iran	Ahmad Arabzad (from Shahrdari Arak)
22	GK	Iran	Ahmad Arabpour (from Yazd Louleh)
40	GK	Iran	Hossein Hooshyar (from Aboumoslem)

Out: Note: Flags indicate national team as defined under FIFA eligibility rules; some limited exceptions apply. Players may hold more than one non-FIFA nationality.

No.	Pos.	Nation	Player
6	MF	Iran	Mohammad Reza Kardoust (to Damash)
33	GK	Iran	Shahram Mehraban (to Saba Qom)
29	DF	Iran	Mahmoud Shafiei (to Saba Qom)
8	MF	Iran	Hamed Pouromrani (to Saba Qom)
4	DF	Serbia	Saša Kolunija (Released)
26	DF	Iran	Ammar Nikkar (to Parseh)
16	DF	Iran	Arman Ghasemi (to Giti Pasand Isfahan)
14	MF	Iran	Mohammad Reza Khorsandnia (to Padideh Shandiz)
7	MF	Iran	Majid Bajelan (Released)
13	FW	Iran	Taghi Nayebi (to Sanat Naft)
36	MF	Iran	Majid Khodabandelou (to Paykan)
30	MF	Iran	Mohammad Parvin (to Parseh)
9	FW	Iran	Farid Abedi (to Nassaji)
17	FW	Iran	Amin Torkashvand (to Paykan)
37	MF	Iran	Omid Sing (to Naft Masjed Soleyman)
15	MF	Armenia	Hamlet Mkhitaryan (Released)
12	GK	Iran	Abolfazl Mousapour (Released)
22	MF	Iran	Hossein Baharvand (Released)
27	DF	Iran	Saber Mohammadi (to Badr Hormozgan)
31	GK	Iran	Saeid Razani (to Saipa Shomal)
35	MF	Iran	Omid Kharaji (Released)
39	DF	Iran	Davoud Bekouk (Released)
40	MF	Iran	Hossein Divsalar (Released)

=== Giti Pasand Isfahan ===
In: Note: Flags indicate national team as defined under FIFA eligibility rules; some limited exceptions apply. Players may hold more than one non-FIFA nationality.

No.	Pos.	Nation	Player
3	DF	Iran	Iman Kiani (from Free agent)
21	DF	Iran	Mehdi Nasiri (from Etka)
16	DF	Iran	Arman Ghasemi (from Gahar Zagros)
10	FW	Iran	Javad Maheri (from Shahrdari Arak)
22	GK	Iran	Majid Gholami (from Gol Gohar)
4	DF	Iran	Hamid Shafaat (from Zob Ahan)
9	DF	Iran	Ebrahim Mohammadi (from Free agent)
12	FW	Iran	Hamid Kazemi (from Mes Kerman)
39	MF	Iran	Mostafa Mahdavi (from Free agent)
17	MF	Iran	Vahid Barati (from Saipa)
2	FW	Iran	Iman Heydari (from Free agent)

Out: Note: Flags indicate national team as defined under FIFA eligibility rules; some limited exceptions apply. Players may hold more than one non-FIFA nationality.

No.	Pos.	Nation	Player

=== Gol Gohar ===
In: Note: Flags indicate national team as defined under FIFA eligibility rules; some limited exceptions apply. Players may hold more than one non-FIFA nationality.

No.	Pos.	Nation	Player
1	GK	Iran	Mohammad Ali Nemati (from Etka)
8	DF	Iran	Mohsen Mozaffarizadeh (from Free agent)
15	MF	Iran	Amir Mohammadi (from Iranjavan)
22	GK	Iran	Hekmat Fooladpour (from Foolad Yazd)
26	MF	Iran	Mohammad Hassan Habibi (from Free agent)
33	MF	Iran	Shahab Shahdadnejad (from Esteghlal Ahvaz)

Out: Note: Flags indicate national team as defined under FIFA eligibility rules; some limited exceptions apply. Players may hold more than one non-FIFA nationality.

No.	Pos.	Nation	Player
22	GK	Iran	Majid Gholami (to Giti Pasand Isfahan)
15	MF	Iran	Hamid Safari (Released)
29	MF	Iran	Sajjad Askari (to Mes Rafsanjan)
1	GK	Iran	Mojtaba Afshari (Released)
8	MF	Iran	Amin Saber (Released)
11	FW	Iran	Ebrahim Valipour (Released)
20	DF	Iran	Mohammad Yari (to Shahrdari Bandar Abbas)
21	MF	Iran	Ali Mohammadi (Released)
24	MF	Iran	Mosayeb Mirkhound (Released)
25	DF	Iran	Alireza Negarestani (Released)
27	MF	Iran	Hojjat Barani (Released)
40	MF	Iran	Hossein Taherinejad (Released)
45	FW	Iran	Mohsen Yekkeh Rousta (Released)

=== Iranjavan ===
In: Note: Flags indicate national team as defined under FIFA eligibility rules; some limited exceptions apply. Players may hold more than one non-FIFA nationality.

No.	Pos.	Nation	Player
14	FW	Iran	Hamidreza Soleymani (from Shahin Bushehr)
11	MF	Iran	Amir Sharafi (from Melli Hafari Ahvaz)
21	MF	Iran	Abbas Barzan (from Shahin Bushehr)
17	MF	Iran	Mostafa Ahmadi (from Shahin Bushehr)
33	GK	Iran	Taleb Dezhgahipour (from Fajr Jam Bushehr)
13	DF	Iran	Hadi Salimi (from Fajr Jam Bushehr)
19	FW	Iran	Hassan Atashi (from Kargar Boneh Gaz)
20	MF	Iran	Hossein Moji (from Kargar Boneh Gaz)
23	MF	Iran	Reza Mardani (from Shahrdari Bandar Abbas)
9	FW	Iran	Mehdi Taremi (from Shahin Bushehr)
31	FW	Iran	Mostafa Bayat (from Melli Hafari Ahvaz)
16	DF	Iran	Vahid Nemati (from Shahin Bushehr)
7	FW	Iran	Mohammad Bagher Zafarani (from Shahrdari Bandar Abbas)
5	DF	Iran	Ezzatollah Pourghaz (from Etka)
26	MF	Iran	Jaber Nasiri (from Shahrdari Bandar Abbas)
30	DF	Iran	Mohammad Vizvari (from Shahin Bushehr)

Out: Note: Flags indicate national team as defined under FIFA eligibility rules; some limited exceptions apply. Players may hold more than one non-FIFA nationality.

No.	Pos.	Nation	Player
7	FW	Iran	Mehdi Chahkoutahzadeh (to Esteghlal Khuzestan)
13	MF	Iran	Ebrahim Salehi (to Esteghlal Khuzestan)
16	FW	Iran	Khosro Pirouzan (to Shahrdari Yasuj)
15	MF	Iran	Soleyman Panahi (to Shahrdari Yasuj)
8	MF	Iran	Jamal Haghshenas (to Mes Rafsanjan)
—	MF	Iran	Amir Mohammadi (to Gol Gohar)
—		Iran	Milad Karimi (Released)
4	DF	Iran	Yaser Mirfendereski (Released)
6	DF	Iran	Reza Nourollahi (Released)
10	MF	Iran	Mostafa Najmizadeh (Released)
11	FW	Iran	Taghi Sanjeri (Released)
14	MF	Iran	Hamed Shirkhanlou (Released)
18	FW	Iran	Amir Nasrollahzadeh (Released)
20	DF	Iran	Sajjad Jalili (Released)
23	MF	Iran	Saeid Babaei (Released)
27	MF	Iran	Mohammad Ahmadi (Released)
31	DF	Iran	Aghil Pouransari (Released)
33	MF	Iran	Sadegh Pouladi (Released)
40	FW	Iran	Mohammad Ahmadpouri (to Aboomoslem)

=== Mes Rafsanjan ===
In: Note: Flags indicate national team as defined under FIFA eligibility rules; some limited exceptions apply. Players may hold more than one non-FIFA nationality.

No.	Pos.	Nation	Player
10	FW	Iran	Ali Alizadeh (from Shahrdari Tabriz)
29	MF	Iran	Sajjad Askari (from Gol Gohar)
20	DF	Iran	Nader Fathollahi (from Padideh Shandiz)
8	MF	Iran	Jamal Haghshenas (from Iranjavan)
7	FW	Iran	Mostafa Chatrabgoun (from Machine Sazi)
11	MF	Iran	Rasoul Elahi Moghadam (from Saipa Shomal)
27	FW	Iran	Ali Vaziri (from Shahrdari Bam)
16	MF	Iran	Ahmad Saeidi (from Alvand Hamedan)
38	MF	Iran	Farshid Salarvand (from Rahian Kermanshah)
14	MF	Iran	Karim Ahmadi (from Rahian Kermanshah)
23	FW	Iran	Hakim Hazbayipour (from Niroye Zamini)
88	MF	Iran	Amir Khodamoradi (from Shahrdari Bandar Abbas)

Out: Note: Flags indicate national team as defined under FIFA eligibility rules; some limited exceptions apply. Players may hold more than one non-FIFA nationality.

No.	Pos.	Nation	Player
5	DF	Iran	Ahmad Amini (Released)
10	MF	Brazil	Danilo Goiano (Released)
11	FW	Iran	Mostafa Kargosha (Released)
14	MF	Iran	Amir Abbas Mohioddini (Released)
16	MF	Iran	Vahid Esmaeilipour (Released)
17	MF	Nigeria	Rimi Bakari (Released)
21	MF	Iran	Saeid Fathi (Released)
23	MF	Iran	Mohammadreza Torabi (Released)
24	FW	Iran	Homayoun Rad (Released)
27	MF	Iran	Bahman Yousefi (Released)
33	MF	Iran	Morteza Aghakhan (Released)
35	MF	Iran	Mohammad Ra'yat (to Yazd Louleh)
—	DF	Iran	Moslem Mahmoudi (Released)
—	MF	Iran	Milad Jafari (Released)
—	FW	Iran	Mohammad Azizi (Released)

=== Naft Gachsaran ===
In: Note: Flags indicate national team as defined under FIFA eligibility rules; some limited exceptions apply. Players may hold more than one non-FIFA nationality.

No.	Pos.	Nation	Player
5	DF	Iran	Nabiollah Bagheriha (from Sanat Naft)
1	GK	Iran	Vahid Kargar (from Shahrdari Yasuj)
9	FW	Iran	Ali Karimi (from Parseh Tehran)
2	DF	Iran	Ali Soleymani (from Nirooye Zamini)
26	DF	Iran	Babak Bidari (from Nirouye Zamini)
20	FW	Iran	Hossein Khosravi (from Yazd Louleh)
37	MF	Iran	Morteza Heidari (from Nirouye Zamini)
17	MF	Iran	Mehdi Karimi (from Shahrdari Arak)
3	DF	Iran	Mohammad Khanahmadi (from Shahrdari Yasuj)
27	MF	Iran	Milad Jafari (from Shahrdari Yasuj)
8	DF	Iran	Mohammad Pourmand (from Shahrdari Yasuj)
13	DF	Iran	Atabak Namazi (from Shahrdari Yasuj)
14	DF	Iran	Kousha Bakhtiarizadeh (from Esteghlal Khuzestan)
25	MF	Iran	Farshid Alipour (from Free agent)
29	FW	Iran	Peyman Ranjbari (from Shahrdari Tabriz)
40	MF	Iran	Hamed Amirkhani (from Free agent)

Out: Note: Flags indicate national team as defined under FIFA eligibility rules; some limited exceptions apply. Players may hold more than one non-FIFA nationality.

No.	Pos.	Nation	Player
—	MF	Iran	Mohammad Mojarrad (to Caspian Qazvin)

=== Naft Masjed Soleyman ===
In: Note: Flags indicate national team as defined under FIFA eligibility rules; some limited exceptions apply. Players may hold more than one non-FIFA nationality.

No.	Pos.	Nation	Player
4	DF	Iran	Kheyrollah Veisi (from Foolad)
8	FW	Iran	Hakim Nassari (from Foolad)
30	MF	Iran	Masoud Ghanavati (from Melli Hafari Ahvaz)
2	DF	Iran	Sasan Shirmardi (from Foolad Novin)
11	FW	Iran	Sajjad Feizollahi (from Paykan)
14	MF	Iran	Mostafa Norouzi (from Melli Hafari Ahvaz)
18	MF	Iran	Milad Davoudi (from Shahrdari Yasuj)
5	DF	Iran	Mohammad Kouti (from Foolad Yazd)
15	MF	Iran	Omid Sing (from Gahar Zagros)
1	GK	Iran	Yousef Behzadi (from Rahian Kermanshah)
6	DF	Iran	Milad Sadeghi (from unknown)
24	MF	Iran	Meysam Douraghi (from unknown)
32	MF	Iran	Amin Salehvandi (from Naft Novin Masjed Soleyman)

Out: Note: Flags indicate national team as defined under FIFA eligibility rules; some limited exceptions apply. Players may hold more than one non-FIFA nationality.

No.	Pos.	Nation	Player
6	DF	Iran	Vahid Amiri (to Naft Tehran)
8	MF	Iran	Hamid Bou Hamdan (to Naft Tehran)
17	FW	Iran	Farzad Mohammadi (to Mes Kerman)
5	DF	Iran	Esmaeil Mohammad Shirazi (to Mes Kerman)
—		Iran	Ebrahim Fallah (Released)
2	DF	Iran	Kamal Tarafi (Released)
4	DF	Iran	Gholamreza Eydizadeh (Released)
10	MF	Iran	Yaghoub Salahshouri (Released)
11	FW	Iran	Mostafa Yarfi (to Foolad Novin)
12	MF	Iran	Sajjad Erfani (to Yazd Louleh)
24	MF	Iran	Ramin Ghorbani (to Badr Hormozgan)
26	DF	Iran	Mohammad Ali Hosseini Gonabadi (to Yazd Louleh)
27	MF	Iran	Milad Sheykhi (Released)
28	MF	Iran	Alireza Ali Babaei (Released)
29	FW	Iran	Moein Rashedi (Released)
31	FW	Iran	Mohammad Ali Karimi Fard (Released)
34	FW	Iran	Ali Sheykh (Released)
40	MF	Iran	Mohammadreza Zolfonoun (Released)

=== Nassaji ===
In: Note: Flags indicate national team as defined under FIFA eligibility rules; some limited exceptions apply. Players may hold more than one non-FIFA nationality.

No.	Pos.	Nation	Player
5	MF	Iran	Issa Pato (from Saipa Shomal)
40	MF	Iran	Esmaeil Gharavi (from Etka)
17	FW	Iran	Sajjad Ashouri (from Persepolis Qaem Shahr)
9	FW	Iran	Farid Abedi (from Gahar Zagros)
6	DF	Iran	Reza Jalali (from Esteghlal Ahvaz)
12	MF	Iran	Mahmoud Pourasadollah (from Bargh Shiraz)
24	FW	Iran	Pouya Khavarpour (from Aluminium Hormozgan)
28	FW	Iran	Sajad Kerman (from Saipa Shomal)
69	GK	Iran	Saeid Ebrahimpour (from Saipa Shomal)

Out: Note: Flags indicate national team as defined under FIFA eligibility rules; some limited exceptions apply. Players may hold more than one non-FIFA nationality.

No.	Pos.	Nation	Player
10	FW	Iran	Mohammad Abbaszadeh (to Persepolis)
1	GK	Iran	Ali Nazarmohammadi (Retired)
5	DF	Iran	Majid Kavianpour (Released)
17	MF	Iran	Milad Poursafshekan (to Parseh)
4	DF	Iran	Ali Ashourizad (to Badr Hormozgan)
21	GK	Iran	Mohammad Savari (Released)
11	FW	Iran	Farhad Kheirkhah (to Mes Soongoun Varzaghan)
20	DF	Iran	Esmaeil Baleh Moghaddas (to Yazd Louleh)
28	DF	Iran	Mohsen Mirabi (to Esteghlal Ahvaz)
—	DF	Iran	Shahriar Moradbeygi (Released)
—	MF	Iran	Peyman Seyfi (to Saipa Shomal)
9	FW	Iran	Mojtaba Geraeili (Released)
12	FW	Iran	Mostafa Mehdizadeh (Released)
16	MF	Iran	Kamran Fadaei (Released)
18	MF	Iran	Ali Salmani (Released)
26	FW	Iran	Alireza Aghajani (Released)
30	FW	Iran	Ehsan Abdi (from Aluminium Hormozgan)
35	MF	Iran	Hossein Baghlani (Released)

=== Nirooye Zamini ===
In: Note: Flags indicate national team as defined under FIFA eligibility rules; some limited exceptions apply. Players may hold more than one non-FIFA nationality.

No.	Pos.	Nation	Player
1	GK	Iran	Mohammad Hosseini (from Saipa Shomal)
3	DF	Iran	Hamed Bour Bour (from Rahian Kermanshah)
5	DF	Iran	Mohammad Mehdi Varankesh (from Yadavaran Shalamcheh)
6	DF	Iran	Peyman Namvar (from Padideh Shandiz)
11	FW	Iran	Sajad Zand Karimi (from Rahian Kermanshah)
12	DF	Iran	Milad Rabbanifard (from Esteghlal Ahvaz)
16	MF	Iran	Mehdi Peykani (from Foolad Yazd)
25	GK	Iran	Hojjat Nourollahzadeh (from Machine Sazi Tabriz)
27	DF	Iran	Azad Dini (from Naft Tehran U21)
44	DF	Iran	Arash Kordi (from Saipa Shomal)

Out: Note: Flags indicate national team as defined under FIFA eligibility rules; some limited exceptions apply. Players may hold more than one non-FIFA nationality.

No.	Pos.	Nation	Player
30	FW	Iran	Hadi Daghagheleh (Loan return to Fajr Sepasi)
2	DF	Iran	Ali Soleymani (to Naft Gachsaran)
23	MF	Iran	Moein Abbasian (to Padideh Shandiz)
7	DF	Iran	Mohammad Mirza Seyedi (to Sanat Naft)
22	MF	Iran	Mohammad Najjar Niaraki (to PAS Hamedan)
4	DF	Iran	Babak Bidari (to Naft Gachsaran)
25	MF	Iran	Morteza Heidari (to Naft Gachsaran)
19	FW	Iran	Masoud Rouzbahani (to Padideh Shandiz)
5	DF	Iran	Mohammad Ashtiani (to Paykan)
—	MF	Iran	Ebrahim Kouh Afkan (Released)
—	MF	Iran	Shahrouz Ghavi Mazhab (Released)
—	FW	Iran	Rasoul Sattarpour (Released)
1	GK	Iran	Saeid Ramezani (Released)
6	DF	Iran	Abbas Yahyabeygi (Released)
17	FW	Iran	Alireza Javadipour (Released)
20	FW	Iran	Hakim Hazbayipour (to Mes Rafsanjan)
24	DF	Iran	Reza Ghiali (Released)
26	MF	Iran	Mohsen Akbari (Released)
27	MF	Iran	Milad Mohammadi (Released)
28	DF	Iran	Shahin Maleki (Released)
29	MF	Iran	farhad Nouri (Released)

=== Padideh Shandiz ===
In: Note: Flags indicate national team as defined under FIFA eligibility rules; some limited exceptions apply. Players may hold more than one non-FIFA nationality.

No.	Pos.	Nation	Player
92	MF	Iran	Hossein Badamaki (from Malavan)
77	MF	Iran	Amjad Shokouh Magham (from Aluminium Hormozgan)
6	MF	Iran	Mohammad Reza Khorsandnia (from Gahar Zagros)
1	GK	Iran	Mojtaba Roshangar (from Aluminium Hormozgan)
11	FW	Iran	Bahman Tahmasebi (from Saba Qom)
21	MF	Iran	Masoud Nazarzadeh (from Mes Kerman)
23	MF	Iran	Moein Abbasian (from Nirooye Zamini)
37	FW	Iran	Abbas Pourkhosravani (from Foolad)
2	DF	Iran	Omid Khalili (from Fajr Sepasi)
7	MF	Iran	Mohammad Mansouri (from Aboomoslem)
20	DF	Iran	Mirhani Hashemi (from Rah Ahan Sorinet)
13	GK	Iran	Omid Gholami (from Aboomoslem)
33	MF	Iran	Meisam Rezapour (from Aboomoslem)
3	DF	Iran	Hadi Shakouri (from Naft Tehran)
10	MF	Iran	Majid Noormohammadi (from Aboomoslem)
14	MF	Iran	Mohammad Hossein Mehrazma (from Naft Tehran)
18	MF	Iran	Mehrdad Ghanbari (from Shahrdari Tabriz)
5	MF	Iran	Behtash Misaghian (from Aluminium Hormozgan U21)
8	MF	Iran	Mohammad Hassan Rajabzadeh (from Rah Ahan Sorinet)
40	DF	Iran	Vahid Asgari (from Aluminium Hormozgan)
9	MF	Iran	Afshin Daneshian (from Shahin Bushehr)
17	FW	Iran	Masoud Rouzbahani (from Nirooye Zamini)
22	GK	Iran	Alireza Heidari (from Rah Ahan Sorinet)
16	MF	Iran	Fariborz Gerami (from Steel Azin)
19	MF	Iran	Mehrdad Solhi (from Naft Tehran U21)

Out: Note: Flags indicate national team as defined under FIFA eligibility rules; some limited exceptions apply. Players may hold more than one non-FIFA nationality.

No.	Pos.	Nation	Player
11	FW	Iran	Ali Ghorbani (to Naft Tehran)
13	MF	Iran	Mohammad Ghaseminejad (to Sanat Naft)
7	MF	Iran	Mohammad Reza Pourmohammad (to Aluminium Hormozgan)
16	MF	Iran	Sajjad Hosseinzadeh (to Mes Kerman)
32	MF	Iran	Mohammad Sadegh Karami (to Esteghlal Ahvaz)
30	GK	Iran	Peyman Shamlou (to Esteghlal Ahvaz)
19	MF	Iran	Reza Afiat Talab (to Siah Jamegan Khorasan)
20	DF	Iran	Nader Fathollahi (to Mes Rafsanjan)
36	FW	Iran	Fakhroddin Shahrouei (to PAS Hamedan)
16	MF	Iran	Ali Vaghef (Released)
9	MF	Iran	Hossein Babaei (to Paykan)
40	GK	Iran	Rasoul Hosseini (to Yazd Louleh)
3	DF	Iran	Mohammad Assar Hassani (to Esteghlal Ahvaz)
5	MF	Iran	Ali Marzban (to Esteghlal Ahvaz)
8	MF	Iran	Mansour Tohidianpour (to Esteghlal Ahvaz)
6	FW	Iran	Behnam Afsheh (to Esteghlal Ahvaz)
33	DF	Iran	Peyman Shirzadi (to Esteghlal Ahvaz)
—	MF	Iran	Behnam Farahani (to Esteghlal Ahvaz)
14	FW	Iran	Javad Molaei (to Esteghlal Ahvaz)
1	GK	Iran	Rouzbeh Sinaki (to Esteghlal Ahvaz)
2	MF	Iran	Hassan Najafi (to Esteghlal Ahvaz)
4	DF	Iran	Peyman Namvar (to Nirooye Zamini)
15	MF	Iran	Mohammad Ali Farokhi (Released)
18	FW	Iran	Rouhollah Bigdeli (Released)
21	MF	Iran	Milad Mahmoudi (Released)

=== Parseh Tehran ===
In: Note: Flags indicate national team as defined under FIFA eligibility rules; some limited exceptions apply. Players may hold more than one non-FIFA nationality.

No.	Pos.	Nation	Player
26	DF	Iran	Ammar Nikkar (from Gahar Zagros)
7	MF	Iran	Mohammad Parvin (from Gahar Zagros)
15	MF	Iran	Milad Poursafshekan (from Nassaji)
17	MF	Iran	Peyman Miri (from Paykan)
2	DF	Iran	Hesam Maghsoudi (from Saipa Shomal)
3	DF	Iran	Alireza Mirshafian (from Paykan)
8	MF	Iran	Ali Ghorbani (from Free agent)
16	MF	Iran	Hassan Eslami (from Saipa)
18	MF	Iran	Hossein Ghaharpour (from Saipa Shomal)
28	MF	Iran	Mohammad Mehdi Elhaei (from Sanat Naft)
32	MF	Iran	Ali Abbaszadeh (from Esteghlal Ahvaz)

Out: Note: Flags indicate national team as defined under FIFA eligibility rules; some limited exceptions apply. Players may hold more than one non-FIFA nationality.

No.	Pos.	Nation	Player
23	DF	Iran	Milad Nosrati (to Saipa)
16	FW	Iran	Saeid Mortazavi (Loan Return to Damash)
10	FW	Iran	Ali Karimi (to Naft Gachsaran)
—	MF	Iran	Asghar Nasiri (to Shahrdari Bandar Abbas)
8	MF	Iran	Sepehr Mir Mohammad Sadegh (to Foolad Yazd)
15	FW	Iran	Mojtaba Mahboub-Mojaz (to PAS Hamedan)
30	DF	Iran	Tohid Gholami (to Shahrdari Bandar Abbas)
27	MF	Iran	Babak Moradi (to Foolad Yazd)
2	DF	Iran	Abbasali Akbarzadeh (Released)
3	DF	Iran	Mojtaba Khanjari (Released)
6	MF	Iran	Mostafa Ahmadi (Released)
12	MF	Iran	Iman Ghanbari (Released)
18	MF	Iran	Babak Novin (Released)
22	GK	Iran	Parviz Boroumand (Released)
28	DF	Iran	Behnam Ahmadi (Released)
—	MF	Iran	Rastin Forghani (Released)
—	MF	Iran	Mehran Hajalifar (Released)

=== PAS Hamedan ===
In: Note: Flags indicate national team as defined under FIFA eligibility rules; some limited exceptions apply. Players may hold more than one non-FIFA nationality.

No.	Pos.	Nation	Player
6	DF	Iran	Omid Khouraj (from Foolad Yazd)
27	DF	Iran	Nader Hooshyar (from Rah Ahan Sorinet)
32	MF	Iran	Emad Ghasemi (from Saipa Shomal)
23	MF	Iran	Mostafa Agheli (from Shahrdari Bandar Abbas)
11	MF	Iran	Mehdi Seifi (from Aluminium Hormozgan)
31	GK	Iran	Mohammad Najjar Niaraki (from Niroye Zamini)
20	FW	Iran	Fakhroddin Shahrouei (from Padideh Shandiz)
17	FW	Iran	Mojtaba Mahboub-Mojaz (from Parseh Tehran)
13	MF	Iran	Kaveh Zangian (from Gostaresh Foolad)
29	MF	Iran	Mojtaba Asgari (from Varesh Bandar Gaz)
19	MF	Iran	Mostafa Gheisari (from Alvand Hamedan)
18	FW	Iran	Amir Hossein Nahal (from Sanat Sari)
16	FW	Iran	Kousha Bahaeipour (from Tose'eh va Omran Ferdos)
10	FW	Iran	Saber Mirghorbani (from Gostaresh Foolad)

Out: Note: Flags indicate national team as defined under FIFA eligibility rules; some limited exceptions apply. Players may hold more than one non-FIFA nationality.

No.	Pos.	Nation	Player
13	DF	Iran	Mohsen Rabikhah (to Tractor Sazi)
44	MF	Iran	Karim Shaverdi (to Esteghlal Khuzestan)
9	FW	Iran	Meghdad Ghobakhlou (to Saipa)
7	DF	Iran	Oveis Kordjahan (to Zob Ahan)
8	MF	Iran	Vahid Aliabadi (to Zob Ahan)
10	MF	Iran	Morteza Tabrizi (to Zob Ahan)
11	DF	Iran	Abbas Kazemian (to Sanat Naft Abadan)
4	DF	Iran	Mojtaba Shiri (to Sanat Naft Abadan)
22	GK	Iran	Masoud Gholamalizad (Released)
20	DF	Iran	Hamid Reza Fathi (to Paykan)
33	GK	Iran	Mohammad Hossein Naeiji (to Saipa Shomal)
12	MF	Iran	Ahmad Taghavi (Released)
14	MF	Iran	Ahmad Jafari (to Aluminium Hormozgan)
38	MF	Iran	Ali Matouri (to Aluminium Hormozgan)

=== Paykan ===
In: Note: Flags indicate national team as defined under FIFA eligibility rules; some limited exceptions apply. Players may hold more than one non-FIFA nationality.

No.	Pos.	Nation	Player
8	MF	Iran	Majid Khodabandelou (from Gahar Zagros)
10	MF	Iran	Behshad Yavarzadeh (from Rah Ahan Sorinet)
6	DF	Iran	Kazem Borjlou (from Saipa)
33	DF	Iran	Mohammad Borjlou (from Zob Ahan)
5	DF	Iran	Alireza Jarahkar (from Zob Ahan)
3	DF	Iran	Mehdi Amirabadi (from Foolad)
11	FW	Iran	Iman Razaghirad (from Saba Qom)
1	GK	Iran	Alireza Ghadiri (from Saba Qom)
2	MF	Iran	Milad Kermani Moghadam (from Naft Tehran)
4	MF	Iran	Hossein Babaei (from Padideh Shandiz)
7	MF	Iran	Mohammad Sadegh Barani (from Zob Ahan)
17	FW	Iran	Babak Latifi (from Saipa)
14	MF	Iran	Ali Amiri (from Yazd Louleh)
18	FW	Iran	Amin Torkashvand (from Gahar Zagros)
20	DF	Iran	Hamid Reza Fathi (from PAS Hamedan)
22	GK	Iran	Abbas Ghasemi (from Free agent)
28	FW	Iran	Mobin Mirdoroughi (from Persepolis U21)
25	DF	Iran	Mohammad Ashtiani (from Niroye Zamini)

Out: Note: Flags indicate national team as defined under FIFA eligibility rules; some limited exceptions apply. Players may hold more than one non-FIFA nationality.

No.	Pos.	Nation	Player
27	DF	Iran	Bahram Dabbagh (to Naft Tehran)
11	MF	Iran	Ahmad Mehdizadeh (to Malavan)
1	GK	Brazil	Fábio Carvalho (to Esteghlal Khuzestan)
23	MF	Iran	Iman Mobali (to Esteghlal Khuzestan)
6	MF	Iran	Milad Zeneyedpour (to Zob Ahan)
35	GK	Iran	Hossein Ashena (to Sanat Naft)
5	DF	Iran	Jalal Kameli-Mofrad (Released)
28	DF	Iran	Masoud Mikaeili (Released)
40	MF	Iran	Peyman Miri (to Paraseh)
18	MF	Iran	Hossein Hosseini (to Mes Soongoun Varzaghan)
—	FW	Iran	Rasoul Baharvandi (to Mes Soongoun Varzaghan)
10	FW	Iran	Sajjad Feizollahi (to Naft Masjed Soleyman)
8	MF	Iran	Davoud Haghi (Released)
7	MF	Iran	Amir Mirbozorgi (Released)
3	DF	Brazil	Diego Máximo (Released)
4	MF	Iran	Reza Maghouli (to Aluminium Hormozgan)
12	GK	Iran	Reza Yadegari (Released)
14	FW	Iran	Ali Salarkhani (Released)
22	FW	Iran	Issa Ale Kasir (to Badr Hormozgan)
24	FW	Iran	Baba Mohammadi (to Foolad Yazd)
20	DF	Iran	Alireza Mirshafian (to Parseh Tehran)
19	FW	Iran	Reza Taheri (to Esteghlal Ahvaz)
17	MF	Iran	Hossein Ghanbari (Released)
16	MF	Iran	Hossein Shahbazi (Released)
30	FW	Brazil	Josiesley Ferreira (Released)

=== Rahian Kermanshah ===
In: Note: Flags indicate national team as defined under FIFA eligibility rules; some limited exceptions apply. Players may hold more than one non-FIFA nationality.

No.	Pos.	Nation	Player
99	MF	Cameroon	David Wirikom (loan return from Saba Qom)
—	MF	Iran	Saeid Bayat (from Free agent)
1	GK	Iran	Masoud Pour Mohammad (from Free agent)
3	DF	Iran	Rasoul Barzegar (from Machine Sazi)
7	MF	Iran	Amin Hejazi (from Yadavaran Shalamcheh)
9	FW	Iran	Hadi Nasrollahi (from Machine Sazi)

Out: Note: Flags indicate national team as defined under FIFA eligibility rules; some limited exceptions apply. Players may hold more than one non-FIFA nationality.

No.	Pos.	Nation	Player
25	DF	Iran	Mahmoud Khamisi (to Gostaresh Foolad)
3	DF	Iran	Hamed Zamani (to Rah Ahan Sorinet)
2	DF	Iran	Saber Khoshnam (to Siah Jamegan Khorasan)
40	MF	Iran	Farshid Salarvand (to Mes Rafsanjan)
14	MF	Iran	Karim Ahmadi (to Mes Rafsanjan)
1	GK	Iran	Yousef Behzadi (to Naft Masjed Soleyman)
11	FW	Iran	Sajad Zand Karimi (to Nirooye Zamini)
5	DF	Iran	Hamed Bour Bour (to Nirooye Zamini)
6	DF	Iran	Jafar Heydari (Released)
9	FW	Iran	Mehdi Shojaeipour (Released)
22	GK	Iran	Saeid Moradi (Released)
24	MF	Iran	Pouria Khezri (Released)
27	MF	Iran	Milad Nikbakht (Released)
28	MF	Iran	Amin Hosseinzadeh (Released)
37	MF	Iran	Mohammad Tavakoli (Released)

=== Saipa Shomal ===
In: Note: Flags indicate national team as defined under FIFA eligibility rules; some limited exceptions apply. Players may hold more than one non-FIFA nationality.

No.	Pos.	Nation	Player
—	MF	Iran	Sina Abdi (from Saipa)
—	MF	Iran	Hamed Soleymani (from Shahin Bushehr)
1	GK	Iran	Saeid Sattari (from Etka)
—	MF	Iran	Amir Hossein Mohammadi (from Free agent)
—	FW	Iran	Mohammad Damadi (from Payam Sanat Amol)
—	DF	Iran	Hadi Khodadadi (from Etka)
—	DF	Iran	Mohammad Gorjizadeh (from Etka)
—	DF	Iran	Hadi Khodadadi (from Etka)
14	MF	Iran	Peyman Seifi (from Nassaji Mazandaran)
—	GK	Iran	Mohammad Hossein Naeiji (from Pas Hamedan)
—	GK	Iran	Saeid Razani (from Gahar Zagros)
—	DF	Iran	Mohsen Hanifi (from Shahrdari Arak)

Out: Note: Flags indicate national team as defined under FIFA eligibility rules; some limited exceptions apply. Players may hold more than one non-FIFA nationality.

No.	Pos.	Nation	Player
20	MF	Iran	Ali Nourian (to Naft Tehran)
15	MF	Iran	Issa Pato (to Nassaji Mazandaran)
5	MF	Iran	Emad Ghasemi (to PAS Hamedan)
8	MF	Iran	Rasoul Elahi Moghadam (to Mes Rafsanjan)
27	MF	Iran	Hossein Kiani Moghadam (to Siah Jamegan Khorasan)
17	FW	Iran	Sajad Kerman (to Nassaji Mazandaran)
1	GK	Iran	Saeid Ebrahimpour (to Nassaji Mazandaran)
22	GK	Iran	Mohammad Hosseini (to Nirooye Zamini)
33	DF	Iran	Arash Kordi (to Nirooye Zamini)
2	DF	Iran	Hesam Maghsoudi (to Parseh Tehran)
14	MF	Iran	Hossein Ghaharpour (from Parseh Tehran)
11	FW	Iran	Amirhossein Yousefi (Released)
13	MF	Iran	Ali Gholizadeh (Released)
16	MF	Iran	Sadegh Najafi (Released)
19	DF	Iran	Mohammad Taheri (Released)
25	MF	Iran	Morteza Malek (Released)
30	MF	Iran	Hossein Gohari (Released)
35	FW	Iran	Mojtaba Ghahari (Released)
38	DF	Iran	Masoud Zarei (Released)

=== Sanat Naft Abadan ===
In: Note: Flags indicate national team as defined under FIFA eligibility rules; some limited exceptions apply. Players may hold more than one non-FIFA nationality.

No.	Pos.	Nation	Player
17	DF	Iran	Abbas Kazemian (from PAS Hamedan)
13	MF	Iran	Mohammad Ghaseminejad (from Padideh Shandiz)
9	MF	Iran	Rahim Mehdi Zohaivi (from Naft Tehran)
19	MF	Iran	Javad Zeyghami (from Aboomoslem)
7	MF	Iran	Meisam Karimi (from Foolad)
4	DF	Iran	Mojtaba Shiri (from PAS Hamedan)
3	DF	Iran	Morteza Gholamalitabar (from Aboomoslem)
68	MF	Iran	Mohsen Azarbad (from Aboomoslem)
31	GK	Iran	Hamid Lotfollahnejad (from Saipa)
10	FW	Iran	Mansour Tanhaei (from Mes Kerman)
25	DF	Iran	Hossein Koushki (from Damash)
11	FW	Iran	Taleb Reykani (from Foolad)
2	DF	Iran	Mohsen Hamidi (from Aluminium Hormozgan)
88	MF	Iran	Hamid Taherifard (from Naft Tehran)
77	GK	Iran	Hossein Ashena (from Paykan)
8	MF	Iran	Mojahed Khaziravi (from Sanat Naft Novin)
33	DF	Iran	Reza Niknazar (from Irankhodro Shaft)
37	MF	Iran	Ghader Afkari (from Machine Sazi)
5	DF	Iran	Mohammad Mirza Seyedi (from Nirooye Zamini)
99	FW	Iran	Farhad Gholizadeh (from Esteghlal U21)
21	MF	Iran	Mohammad Agha Mohammadi (from Shahrdari Yasuj)
18	FW	Iran	Ali Ale Kasir (from Fajr Jam Bushehr)
14	FW	Iran	Taghi Nayebi (from Gahar Zagros)

Out: Note: Flags indicate national team as defined under FIFA eligibility rules; some limited exceptions apply. Players may hold more than one non-FIFA nationality.

No.	Pos.	Nation	Player
8	MF	Iran	Rasoul Navidkia (to Naft Tehran)
14	DF	Iran	Hossein Kaabi (to Esteghlal Khuzestan)
9	FW	Iran	Reza Khaleghifar (to Rah Ahan Sorinet)
27	FW	Iran	Behnam Barzay (to Rah Ahan Sorinet)
7	MF	Iran	Siamak Koohnavard (to Fajr Sepasi)
11	FW	Iran	Mehdi Daghagheleh (to Malavan)
19	DF	Iran	Sajjad Moshkelpour (to Saipa)
23	FW	Iran	Rouhollah Arab (to Zob Ahan)
12	GK	Iran	Habib Dehghani (to Damash)
34	MF	Portugal	Hugo Machado (Released)
5	DF	Iran	Nabiollah Bagheriha (to Naft Gachsaran)
20	DF	Armenia	Valeri Aleksanyan (to Rah Ahan Sorinet)
6	MF	Iran	Ali Mombaini (Released)
22	GK	Iran	Mehrdad Bashagardi (to Aboomoslem)
4	DF	Iran	Elias Shahnavazipour (Released)
21	MF	Iran	Mehdi Kiani (to Aboomoslem)
24	MF	Iran	Hadi Ramezani (Released)
25	MF	Iran	Siamak Sarlak (Released)
28	MF	Iran	Zobeir Niknafs (Released)
29	MF	Iran	Hossein Mokhtari (Released)
31	DF	Iran	Hamid Tahanejad (Released)
32	MF	Iran	Mohammad Mehdi Elhaei (to Parseh Tehran)

=== Siah Jamegan Khorasan ===
In: Note: Flags indicate national team as defined under FIFA eligibility rules; some limited exceptions apply. Players may hold more than one non-FIFA nationality.

No.	Pos.	Nation	Player
—	MF	Iran	Reza Afiat Talab (from Padideh Shandiz)
—	GK	Iran	Sirous Sangchouli (from Foolad Yazd)
—	MF	Iran	Hamid Marvi (from Shahrdari Yasuj)
—	MF	Iran	Hossein Kiani Moghadam (from Saipa Shomal)
—	DF	Iran	Saber Khoshnam (from Rahian Kermanshah)
—	FW	Iran	Behnam Beiranvand (from Aboumoslem)
—	FW	Iran	Iman Nematpour (from Foolad Yazd)
—	FW	Iran	Hamid Gholami (from Free agent)

Out: Note: Flags indicate national team as defined under FIFA eligibility rules; some limited exceptions apply. Players may hold more than one non-FIFA nationality.

No.	Pos.	Nation	Player
—	MF	Iran	Hossein Aghaei (Released)
—	DF	Iran	Majid Ghadimi (Released)

=== Shahrdari Bandar Abbas ===
In: Note: Flags indicate national team as defined under FIFA eligibility rules; some limited exceptions apply. Players may hold more than one non-FIFA nationality.

No.	Pos.	Nation	Player
11	FW	Iran	Mehrdad Avakh (from Aluminium Hormozgan)
12	GK	Iran	Hadi Rishi Esfahani (from Esteghlal)
23	MF	Iran	Ahmad Davoudi (from Melli Hafari Ahvaz)
77	DF	Iran	Saeid Fatemi (from Aboomoslem)
19	FW	Iran	Vahid Khedmatkari (from Free agent)
15	FW	Iran	Amir Khalifeh Asl (from Aluminium Hormozgan)
18	GK	Iran	Mostafa Salehi (from Foolad Yazd)
2	MF	Iran	Asghar Nasiri (from Parseh Tehran)
4		Iran	Mohsen Chegini (from Fajr Jam Bushehr)
31		Iran	Alireza Eslami (from Shahrdari Novin Bandar Abbas)
28		Iran	Amin Shams (from Shahrdari Novin Bandar Abbas)
27		Iran	Mehran Poshtkouhi (from Shahrdari Novin Bandar Abbas)
29		Iran	Danial Ameri (from Shahrdari Novin Bandar Abbas)
24		Iran	Saeid Kahalipour (from Shahrdari Novin Bandar Abbas)
50	MF	Iran	Mahdi Eslami (from Esteghlal U21)
5	DF	Iran	Vahid Jafari (from Shahrdari Yasuj)
14	DF	Iran	Mohammad Yari (from Gol Gohar)
25	MF	Iran	Abdollah Mombeyni (from Esteghlal Ahvaz)
30	DF	Iran	Tohid Gholami (from Parseh Tehran)

Out: Note: Flags indicate national team as defined under FIFA eligibility rules; some limited exceptions apply. Players may hold more than one non-FIFA nationality.

No.	Pos.	Nation	Player
7	MF	Iran	Mehdi Agha Mohammadi (Released)
22	GK	Iran	Parviz Karimi (to Esteghlal Khuzestan)
23	MF	Iran	Reza Mardani (to Iranjavan)
3	DF	Iran	Hamidreza Farzaneh (Retired)
19	MF	Iran	Pejman Shahpari (Released)
11	MF	Iran	Shahin Majidi (to Aluminium Hormozgan)
6	FW	Iran	Mohammad Bagher Zafarani (to Iranjavan)
8	MF	Iran	Amir Khodamoradi (to Mes Rafsanjan)
5	DF	Iran	Jaber Nasiri (to Iranjavan)
13	MF	Iran	Alireza Zolki (to Shahin Bushehr)
—	MF	Iran	Mostafa Agheli (to PAS Hamedan)
—		Iran	Yaser Ebrahimi (Released)
12	MF	Iran	Moslem Mohammadnejad (Released)
20	DF	Iran	Esmaeil Vahedi (to Aluminium Hormozgan)
24	MF	Iran	Abbas Barahouei (Released)
27	MF	Iran	Mohammadreza Pour Rostam (Released)
28	MF	Iran	Sina Bastami (Released)
30	DF	Iran	Hossein Afra (Released)
33	GK	Iran	Mansour Modarayi (Released)

=== Shahrdari Yasuj ===
In: Note: Flags indicate national team as defined under FIFA eligibility rules; some limited exceptions apply. Players may hold more than one non-FIFA nationality.

No.	Pos.	Nation	Player
1	GK	Iran	Hassan Houri (from Shahin Bushehr)
40	MF	Iran	Hossein Hejazipour (from Shahrdari Tabriz)
16	FW	Iran	Khosro Pirouzan (from Iranjavan)
11	MF	Iran	Mohammad Javad Zarei (from Bargh Shiraz)
2	MF	Iran	Ehsan Shirmardi (from Yadavaran Shalamcheh)
50	MF	Iran	Soleyman Panahi (from Iranjavan)
5	DF	Iran	Meisam Amiri (from Yazd Louleh)
2	DF	Iran	Ali Mohammad Dehghan (from Shahrdari Tabriz)
22	GK	Iran	Mohammadreza Amin Sanayei (from Shahin Bushehr)

Out: Note: Flags indicate national team as defined under FIFA eligibility rules; some limited exceptions apply. Players may hold more than one non-FIFA nationality.

No.	Pos.	Nation	Player
8	DF	Iran	Mohammad Khanahmadi (to Naft Gachsaran)
1	GK	Iran	Vahid Kargar (to Naft Gachsaran)
2	MF	Iran	Mohammad Agha Mohammadi (to Sanat Naft)
11	MF	Iran	Milad Jafari (to Naft Gachsaran)
7	MF	Iran	Hamid Marvi (to Siah Jamegan Khorasan)
30	DF	Iran	Mohammad Pourmand (to Naft Gachsaran)
6	MF	Iran	Rahim Rahimi (to Badr Hormozgan)
22	MF	Iran	Milad Davoudi (to Naft Masjed Soleyman)
3	DF	Iran	Alireza Kordi (Released)
5	DF	Iran	Vahid Jafari (to Shahrdari Bandar Abbas)
13	DF	Iran	Atabak Namazi (to Naft Gachsaran)
15	MF	Iran	Hadi Moradi (Released)
18	MF	Iran	Farzad Shojaei (Released)
27	MF	Iran	Sayad Kokabi (Released)
32	GK	Iran	Ali Asadi (Released)

=== Yazd Louleh ===
In: Note: Flags indicate national team as defined under FIFA eligibility rules; some limited exceptions apply. Players may hold more than one non-FIFA nationality.

No.	Pos.	Nation	Player
1	GK	Iran	Hamid Erfani (from Shahrdari Arak)
2	DF	Iran	Hossein Hamidi (from Yadavaran Shalamcheh)
3	DF	Iran	Mojtaba Zare Mehrjerdi (from Esteghlal Khuzestan)
6	DF	Iran	Mohammad Ali Hosseini Gonabadi (from Naft Masjed Soleyman)
7	MF	Iran	Sajjad Erfani (from Naft Masjed Soleyman)
9	FW	Iran	Iman Rezaei (from Alvand Hamedan)
10	MF	Iran	Alireza Beyk Zavieh (from Foolad Yazd)
11	FW	Iran	Ahmad Passi (from Machine Sazi)
13	DF	Iran	Kazem Hayatmanesh (from Etka)
15	DF	Iran	Reza Talabeh (from Yadavaran Shalamcheh)
16	MF	Iran	Milad Rakhshan (from Shahrdari Arak)
17	MF	Iran	Mehdi Tayefi (from Foolad Yazd)
18	DF	Iran	Mohammad Ali Hosseini (from Etka)
20	DF	Iran	Esmaeil Baleh Moghaddas (from Nassaji Mazandaran)
24	MF	Iran	Mohammad Khodakaramnejad (from Yadavaran Shalamcheh)
30	MF	Iran	Mohammad Ra'yat (from Mes Rafsanjan)
33	GK	Iran	Rasoul Hosseini (from Padideh Shandiz)

Out: Note: Flags indicate national team as defined under FIFA eligibility rules; some limited exceptions apply. Players may hold more than one non-FIFA nationality.

No.	Pos.	Nation	Player
33	MF	Iran	Behnam Askarkhani (to Fajr Sepasi)
13	MF	Iran	Foad Aghaei (to Fajr Sepasi)
1	GK	Iran	Ebrahim Mirzapour (Released)
16	FW	Iran	Ali Alipour (to Rah Ahan Sorinet)
7	MF	Iran	Morteza Aziz-Mohammadi (to Alvand Hamedan)
3	DF	Iran	Hadi Rekabi (to Foolad Yazd)
4	DF	Iran	Meisam Amiri (to Shahrdari Yasuj)
20	FW	Iran	Hossein Khosravi (to Naft Gachsaran)
—		Iran	Mohammad Sadeghian (Released)
2	MF	Iran	Mehrzad Rezaei (Released)
6	DF	Iran	Mojtaba Ensafi (to Alvand Hamedan)
8	MF	Iran	Hossein Ahmadlou (to Gahar Zagros)
9	MF	Iran	Ali Amiri (to Paykan)
10	MF	Iran	Abbas Aghaei (Released)
11	FW	Iran	Hadi Azizi (Released)
14	DF	Iran	Amirreza Khan Ahmadi (Released)
15	MF	Iran	Jalal Abdi (to Foolad Yazd)
17	MF	Iran	Hamed Basiri (to Gahar Zagros)
18	MF	Iran	Mehrdad Mir (Released)
19	FW	Iran	Hojjat Kazemian (Released)
21	DF	Iran	Abolfazl Karimi (Released)
22	GK	Iran	Hamid Sherkatolabbasi (Released)
23	FW	Iran	Milad Sharifat (Released)
25	MF	Iran	Mohammadreza Masoumi (Released)
30	GK	Iran	Ahmad Arabpour (to Gahar Zagros)
31	FW	Iran	Amir Abi (to Gahar Zagros)

Notes

- ^{PL} Pro League quota.
