= Meisam =

Meisam or sometimes Meysam is a given name. Notable people with the name include:

- Meisam Aghababaei, Iranian footballer
- Meisam Bagheri (born 1991), Iranian taekwondo athlete
- Maysam Baou (born 1983), retired Iranian football player
- Meisam Dalkhani (born 1997), Iranian Greco-Roman wrestler
- Meysam Hosseini (born 1987), former footballer
- Meysam Joudaki (born 1995), Iranian footballer
- Meisam Mirzaei (born 1992), Iranian basketball player
- Meisam Mostafa-Jokar (born 1985), Iranian male freestyle wrestler
- Meisam Nassiri (born 1989), Iranian freestyle wrestler
- Meisam Rezapour (born 1981), Iranian football player
- Meisam Salehi (born 1998), volleyball player
