= Veisi =

Veisi (Persian: ویسی) is a Persian surname. Notable people with the surname include:

- Abdollah Veisi (born 1971), Iranian footballer and coach
- Kheyrollah Veisi (born 1988), Iranian footballer
- Saman Veisi (born 1982), Iranian basketball player
