= Mehrdad Bashagardi =

Iranian footballer

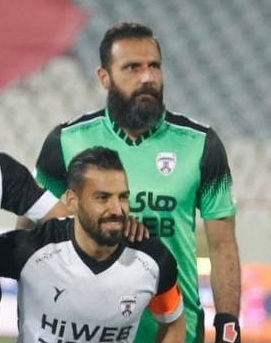

Personal information
- Full name: Mehrdad Bashagardi
- Date of birth: 3 September 1984 (age 42)
- Place of birth: Iran
- Height: 1.93 m (6 ft 4 in)
- Position: Goalkeeper

Team information
- Current team: Havadar
- Number: 1

Senior career*
Years	Team	Apps	(Gls)
2009–2012	Sanat Naft	10	(0)
2012–2013	Aboumoslem	5	(0)
2013–2014	Esteghlal Ahvaz	7	(0)
2014–2015	PAS Hamedan	20	(0)
2015	Foolad	1	(0)
2015–2016	Parseh	18	(0)
2017–2018	Bargh Jadid	17	(0)
2018–2021	Gol Gohar Sirjan	43	(0)
2021–	Havadar	14	(0)
2022–	Saipa F.C.	0	(0)
- * Club domestic league appearances and goals as of 8 February 2022 ‡ National team caps and goals as of 26 March 2010

Mehrdad Bashagardi (born 3 September 1984) is an Iranian footballer who currently playing for Havadar.

== Club career ==
Bashagardi was with Sanat Naft from 2009 to 2014.

On November 20, 2015, Bashagardi made his debut for Foolad in a home defeat against Esteghlal.

Club performance			League		Cup		Continental		Total	
Season	Club	League	Apps	Goals	Apps	Goals	Apps	Goals	Apps	Goals
Iran			League		Hazfi Cup		Asia		Total	
2009–10	Sanat Naft	Azadegan League	?	0	0	0	-	-		0
2010–11	Sanat Naft	Persian Gulf Cup	2	0	0	0	-	-	2	0
2011–12	Sanat Naft	Persian Gulf Cup	4	0	0	0	-	-	4	0
Total	Iran		6	0	0	0	-	-	6	0
Career total			6	0	0	0	-	-	6	0
