= Karim Ahmadi =

Iranian midfielder

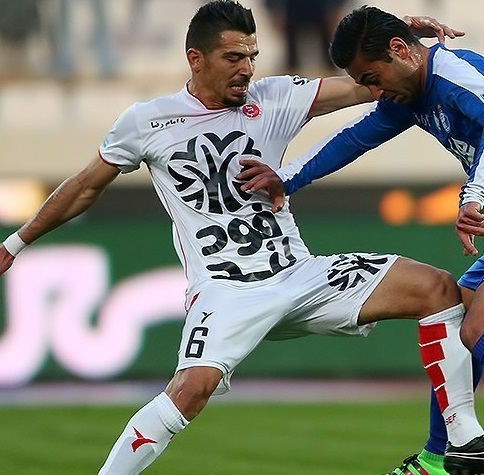

Personal information
- Date of birth: 5 January 1986 (age 40)
- Place of birth: Arak, Iran
- Height: 1.78 m (5 ft 10 in)
- Position: Midfielder

Senior career*
Years	Team	Apps	(Gls)
2010–2012	Shirin Faraz	30	(0)
2012–2013	Rahian Kermanshah	23	(4)
2013–2014	Mes Rafsanjan	18	(0)
2014–2015	Siah Jamegan	19	(3)
2015–2017	Padideh	51	(0)
2017–2018	Siah Jamegan	9	(0)
2018	Baadraan	3	(0)
2018–2019	Arvand Khorramshahr	19	(0)
2019–2020	Rayka Babol	30	(1)
2020–2021	Shahin Bushehr	1	(0)
2021	Arman Gohar	5	(0)
2021–2022	Chooka Talesh	10	(1)
- * Club domestic league appearances and goals

Karim Ahmadi (Persian: کریم احمدی; born 5 January 1986) is an Iranian former football midfielder.
