= Mehdi Mohammadi =

Iranian footballer (born 1981)

Personal information
- Full name: Mehdi Mohammadi
- Date of birth: 28 April 1981 (age 45)
- Place of birth: Tehran, Iran
- Position: Centre back

Youth career
- 2003–2005: Paykan

Senior career*
Years	Team	Apps	(Gls)
2005–2008	Paykan	47	(2)
2008–2009	Moghavemat	14	(0)
2009–2012	Steel Azin	86	(8)
2012–2013	Mes Kerman	18	(0)
2013–2014	Saba Qom	15	(0)
- * Club domestic league appearances and goals as of 10 May 2014

Mehdi Mohammadi (Persian: مهدی محمدی; born 28 April 1981) is an Iranian footballer.

== Club career ==
Mohammadi joined Steel Azin F.C. in 2009 after spending the previous season with Moghavemat Sepasi F.C.

=== Club career statistics ===
As of 17 August 2014

Club performance			League		Cup		Continental		Total	
Season	Club	League	Apps	Goals	Apps	Goals	Apps	Goals	Apps	Goals
Iran			League		Hazfi Cup		Asia		Total	
2006–07	Paykan	Pro League	22	0	2	0	-	-	24	0
2007–08	Paykan	Pro League	25	2			-	-		
2008–09	Moghavemat	Pro League	14	0			-	-		
2009–10	Steel Azin	Pro League	33	4			-	-		
2010–11	Steel Azin	Pro League	27	0	1	0	-	-	28	0
2011–12	Steel Azin	Division 1	26	4			-	-		
2012–13	Mes Kerman	Pro League	18	0		0	-	-		0
2013–14	Saba Qom	Pro League	15	0	0	0	-	-	15	0
Career total			180	10			0	0		

- Assist Goals

Season	Team	Assists
09–10	Steel Azin	1
10–11	Steel Azin	0
