= Baba Mohammadi =

Iranian footballer

Personal information
- Date of birth: 14 February 1991 (age 35)
- Place of birth: Shahriar, Iran
- Height: 1.82 m (6 ft 0 in)
- Position: Striker

Youth career
- –2010: Saipa
- 2010–2012: Paykan

Senior career*
Years	Team	Apps	(Gls)
2012–2013	Paykan	10	(0)
2013–2015	Foolad Yazd	31	(3)
2015–2016	Giti Pasand	34	(3)
2016–2017	Iranjavan	15	(3)
2017	Pars Jam	13	(4)
2017	Shahrdari Mahshahr	14	(1)
2017–2018	Khooneh	2	(0)
2018–2020	Fajr Sepasi	42	(12)
2020–2021	Mes Kerman	30	(9)
2021–2022	Zob Ahan	10	(0)
2022	Havadar	4	(0)
2022–2023	Kheybar	4	(2)
2023	Pars Jam	5	(1)
2023–2024	Shahr Raz Shiraz	3	(0)

International career^{‡}
2012	Iran U-22	1	(0)
- * Club domestic league appearances and goals as of 10 June 2024 ‡ National team caps and goals as of 7 September 2012

Baba Mohammadi (Persian: بابا محمدی; born 14 February 1991) is an Iranian footballer.

== Club career ==
Mohammadi started his career with Paykan at youth level. In the summer of 2012 he was moved to first team by the coach Abdollah Veisi. He made his debut against Gahar.

=== Club career statistics ===
Club performance			League		Cup		Continental		Total	
Season	Club	League	Apps	Goals	Apps	Goals	Apps	Goals	Apps	Goals
Iran			League		Hazfi Cup		Asia		Total	
2012–13	Paykan	Pro League	1	0	0	0	-	-	1	0
Career total			1	0	0	0	0	0	1	0

== International ==
=== U22 ===
He is invited to Iran U-22 by Alireza Mansourian.
