= Ali Ashourizad =

Iranian footballer

Personal information
- Full name: Mohammad Ali Ashourizad
- Date of birth: 1 August 1980 (age 46)
- Place of birth: Rasht, Iran
- Position: Defender

Senior career*
Years	Team	Apps	(Gls)
- Malavan
–2005	Pegah Gilan		
2005–2008	Saipa	48	(0)
2008–2009	Damash Gilan	23	(0)
2009–2011	Steel Azin	36	(0)
2012–2013	Nassaji		
2013–2014	Badr Hormozgan		
- * Club domestic league appearances and goals as of 31 Jan 2011

Ali Ashourizad Hayvan (Persian: علی عشوری‌زاد; born August 1, 1980) is an Iranian retired football player.

== Career statistics ==
Club performance			League		Cup		Continental		Total	
Season	Club	League	Apps	Goals	Apps	Goals	Apps	Goals	Apps	Goals
Iran			League		Hazfi Cup		Asia		Total	
2004–05	Pegah	Persian Gulf Cup	25	1			-	-		
2005–06	Saipa	Persian Gulf Cup	5	0			-	-		
2006–07	Saipa	Persian Gulf Cup	24	0			-	-		
2007–08	Saipa	Persian Gulf Cup	19	0			2	0		
2008–09	Damash	Persian Gulf Cup	23	0	0	0	-	-	23	0
2009–10	Steel Azin	Persian Gulf Cup	25	0	0	0	-	-	25	0
2010–11	Steel Azin	Persian Gulf Cup	11	0	2	0	-	-	6	0
Total	Iran		132	1			2	0		
Career total			132	1			2	0		

- Assist goals

Season	Team	Assists
2010–11	Steel Azin	0
