= Morteza Falahati =

Iranian Football Defender

Personal information
- Full name: Morteza Falahati
- Date of birth: 21 March 1989 (age 37)
- Place of birth: Iran
- Position: Defender

Team information
- Current team: Siah Jamegan

Senior career*
Years	Team	Apps	(Gls)
2012–2013	Aboomoslem	14	(0)
2013–2015	Malavan	4	(0)
2015–	Siah Jamegan	5	(0)
- * Club domestic league appearances and goals as of 22 June 2015

Morteza Falahati (Persian: مرتضی فلاحتی; born March 21, 1989) is an Iranian football defender who plays for Siah Jamegan in the Persian Gulf Pro League.
