= Ali Marzban =

Iranian footballer

Personal information
- Full name: Ali Marzban
- Date of birth: 7 July 1990 (age 36)
- Place of birth: Iran
- Height: 1.80 m (5 ft 11 in)
- Position: Midfielder

Team information
- Current team: Mes Kerman

Youth career
- 2006–2008: Sepahan
| 2008–2010 | → Novin (loan) | ? | (4) |
| 2010–2011 | → Foolad Natanz (loan) | 1 | (0) |
| 2011–2013 | Mes Kerman | 0 | (0) |

International career^{‡}
| Years | Team | Apps | (Gls) |
| 2010 – 2011 | Iran U-23 | 6 | (0) |
- ‡ National team caps and goals as of 23 February 2011

Ali Marzban (Persian: علی مرزبان; born July 7, 1990) is an Iranian football player currently playing for Mes Kerman of the Iran Pro League.

== Career ==
Marzban played for Sepahan Novin before moving to Foolad Natanz in the summer of 2010.

| Club performance | | | League | | Cup | | Continental | | Total | |
| Season | Club | League | Apps | Goals | Apps | Goals | Apps | Goals | Apps | Goals |
| Iran | | | League | | Hazfi Cup | | Asia | | Total | |
|---|---|---|---|---|---|---|---|---|---|---|
| 2008–09 | Se. Novin | Azadegan | ? | 2 | | 0 | 0 | 0 | | 0 |
| 2009–10 | Se. Novin | Azadegan | 22 | 2 | | 0 | 0 | 0 | | 0 |
| 2010–11 | Fo. Natanz | Azadegan | 1 | 0 | | 0 | - | - | | 0 |
| 2011–12 | Mes Kerman | Persian Gulf Cup | 0 | 0 | 0 | 0 | - | - | 0 | 0 |
| Career total | | | | 4 | | 0 | 0 | 0 | | 4 |

== International ==
In 2010, Marzban was selected to participate in Iran U-23 football team's training camp in Poland.

== External sources ==
- Profile at Persianleague
