= Hadi Azizi =

Iranian footballer

Personal information
- Full name: Hadi Azizi
- Date of birth: 27 January 1990 (age 36)
- Place of birth: Bandar Anzali, Iran
- Height: 1.81 m (5 ft 11 in)
- Position: Attacking midfielder

Senior career*
Years	Team	Apps	(Gls)
2008–2012	Malavan	31	(2)
2012–2013	Sang Ahan Bafq F.C.	9	(2)
- * Club domestic league appearances and goals

Hadi Azizi (Persian: هادی عزیزی, born 27 January 1990) is an Iranian footballer who plays as an attacking midfielder. He played in the Iran Pro League for Malavan.
