= Peyman Shirzadi =

Iranian footballer

Personal information
- Full name: Peyman Shirzadi
- Date of birth: 24 June 1988 (age 38)
- Place of birth: Tehran, Iran
- Height: 1.81 m (5 ft 11 1/2 in)
- Position: Left back

Team information
- Current team: Pars Jonoubi

Senior career*
| Years | Team | Apps | (Gls) |
| –2012 | Niroo Zamini | 20 | (1) |
| 2012–2013 | Mes Sarcheshme | 15 | (0) |
| 2013–2014 | Esteghlal Ahvaz | 20 | (0) |
| 2014–2015 | Mes Rafsanjan | | (0) |
| 2015–2017 | Esteghlal Khuzestan | 41 | (2) |
| 2017–2019 | Foolad | 27 | (0) |
| 2019– | Pars Jonoubi | 0 | (0) |
- * Club domestic league appearances and goals as of 11 April 2019

Peyman Shirzadi (Persian: پیمان شیرزادی, born June 24, 1988, in Tehran, Iran) is an Iranian Football defender who most recently played for Iranian football club Foolad in the Persian Gulf Pro League.

== Career ==
Shirzadi left Foolad in mid January.

== Club career ==
Shirzadi signed his first professional contract in 2015 and has played for Esteghlal Khuzestan.

| Club performance | | | League | | Cup | | Continental | | Total | |
| Season | Club | League | Apps | Goals | Apps | Goals | Apps | Goals | Apps | Goals |
| Iran | | | League | | Hazfi Cup | | Asia | | Total | |
|---|---|---|---|---|---|---|---|---|---|---|
| 2015–16 | Esteghlal Khuzestan | Persian Gulf Pro League | 16 | 1 | 2 | 0 | - | - | 18 | 1 |
| 2016–17 | Esteghlal Khuzestan | Persian Gulf Pro League | 25 | 1 | 1 | 0 | 8 | 0 | 34 | 1 |
| Career total | | | 41 | 2 | 3 | 0 | 8 | 0 | 52 | 2 |

== Honours ==
=== Club ===
Esteghlal Khuzestan

- Persian Gulf Pro League (1) : 2015–16
