= Milad Ahmadi =

Iranian footballer

Personal information
- Full name: Milad Ahmadi Majd
- Date of birth: September 18, 1996 (age 30)
- Place of birth: Tehran, Iran
- Height: 1.73 m (5 ft 8 in)
- Position: Midfielder

Team information
- Current team: Oghab Tehran
- Number: 78

Youth career
- 2015–2017: Esteghlal

Senior career*
Years	Team	Apps	(Gls)
2017–2018	Naft Tehran	4	(0)
2018–2020	Sepidrood	10	(0)
2020–	Oghab Tehran	1	(0)
- * Club domestic league appearances and goals as of 1 November 2021

Milad Ahmadi (Persian: میلاد احمدی; born June 18, 1996, in Tehran) is an Iranian footballer who plays as a midfielder for Iranian club Oghab Tehran in the League 2.

== Club career ==
=== Club Career Statistics ===
- Last Update: 1 August 2020

Club performance			League		Cup		Continental		Total	
Season	Club	League	Apps	Goals	Apps	Goals	Apps	Goals	Apps	Goals
Iran			League		Hazfi Cup		Asia		Total	
2017–18	Naft Tehran	Persian Gulf Pro League	4	0	0	0	–	–	4	0
2018–19	Sepidrood	Persian Gulf Pro League	2	0	0	0	–	–	2	0
2019–20	Sepidrood	Azadegan League	8	0	0	0	–	–	8	0
Career total			14	0	0	0	0	0	14	0
