= Arash Gholizadeh =

Iranian footballer

Personal information
- Full name: Arash Gholizadeh
- Date of birth: 24 January 1990 (age 36)
- Place of birth: Rasht, Iran
- Position: Defender

Team information
- Current team: Steel Azin

Youth career
- Malavan

Senior career*
Years	Team	Apps	(Gls)
2007–2011	Malavan	9	(0)
2011–	Steel Azin	0	(0)
- * Club domestic league appearances and goals as of 8 December 2011 (UTC) ‡ National team caps and goals as of 22 March 2010

Arash Gholizadeh (Persian: آرش قلی زاده, romanized: Âraš Qolizâde; born 24 January 1990) is an Iranian footballer who plays for Steel Azin F.C. in the Azadegan League.

== Club career ==
Gholizadeh has played his entire career with Malavan F.C.

=== Club career statistics ===
As of 8 December 2011

Club performance			League		Cup		Continental		Total	
Season	Club	League	Apps	Goals	Apps	Goals	Apps	Goals	Apps	Goals
Iran			League		Hazfi Cup		Asia		Total	
2007–08	Malavan	Pro League	3	0	0	0	-	-	3	0
2008–09	Malavan	Pro League	4	0			-	-	4	0
2009–10	Malavan	Pro League	2	0			-	-	2	0
2010–11	Malavan	Pro League	0	0	0	0	-	-	0	0
2011–12	Steel Azin	Division 1	0	0	0	0	-	-	0	0
Career total			9	0				0	9	0

- Assist Goals

Season	Team	Assists
10–11	Malavan	0
