= Mohammad Hosseinpour =

Iranian footballer

Personal information
- Date of birth: 26 May 1993 (age 33)
- Place of birth: Babol, Iran
- Height: 1.71 m (5 ft 7 in)
- Position: Midfielder

Youth career
- 2011–2013: Esteghlal

Senior career*
Years	Team	Apps	(Gls)
2013–2015	Rah Ahan	20	(1)
2015–2016	Khoneh Be Khoneh	7	(0)
2016–2018	Oxin Alborz	35	(8)
2018–2019	Malavan	19	(2)
2019–2020	Mes Rafsanjan	2	(0)
2020–2021	Malavan	11	(1)
2021–2022	Rayka Babol	5	(0)
2022–2023	Darya Caspian	6	(0)
2023–2024	Shohada Babolsar		
- * Club domestic league appearances and goals as of 23 May 2023

Mohammad Hosseinpour (Persian: محمد حسین‌پور; born 26 May 1993) is an Iranian football midfielder.

== Club career ==
=== Club career statistics ===
As of 10 May 2013

Club performance			League		Cup		Continental		Total	
Season	Club	League	Apps	Goals	Apps	Goals	Apps	Goals	Apps	Goals
Iran			League		Hazfi Cup		Asia		Total	
2013–14	Rah Ahan	Iran Pro League	5	0	0	0	–	–	5	0
Career total			5	0	0	0	0	0	5	0

- Assist Goals

Season	Team	Assists
13–14	Rah Ahan	1

== International career ==
=== U23 ===
He invited to Iran U-23 training camp by Nelo Vingada to preparation for Incheon 2014 and 2016 AFC U-22 Championship (Summer Olympic qualification).
