= Mehdi Rahimzadeh =

Iranian footballer

Personal information
- Full name: Mehdi "Armin" Rahimzadeh Motahed
- Date of birth: 1 March 1989 (age 37)
- Place of birth: Khomam, Iran
- Position: Goalkeeper

Team information
- Current team: Damash

Youth career
- Malavan

Senior career*
Years	Team	Apps	(Gls)
2008–2012	Malavan	43	(0)
2012–2013	Gostaresh Foolad	7	(0)
2013–2014	Malavan	3	(0)
2014–	Damash	5	(0)
- * Club domestic league appearances and goals as of 18 March 2015 (UTC)

Mehdi Rahimzadeh (born March 1, 1989) is an Iranian footballer.

== Club career ==
Rahimzadeh started his career with Malavan F.C.

=== Club career statistics ===
Club performance			League		Cup		Total	
Season	Club	League	Apps	Goals	Apps	Goals	Apps	Goals
Iran			League		Hazfi Cup		Total	
2008–09	Malavan	Pro League	1	0	0	0	1	0
2009–10	Malavan	Pro League	24	0	2	0	26	0
2010–11	Malavan	Pro League	15	0	1	0	16	0
2011–12	Malavan	Pro League	3	0	0	0	0	0
2012–13	Gostaresh	Azadegan League	7	0	0	0	1	0
2013–14	Malavan	Pro League	3	0	0	0	3	0
2014–15	Damash	Azadegan League	5	0	–	–	5	0
Career total			58	0	3	0	561	0
