= Peyman Miri =

Iranian footballer

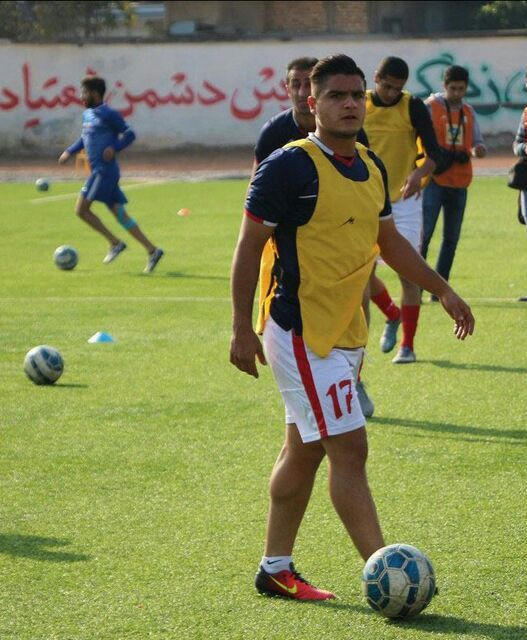

Personal information
- Full name: Seyed Peyman Miri
- Date of birth: 29 November 1992 (age 33)
- Place of birth: Tehran, Iran
- Height: 1.70 m (5 ft 7 in)
- Position: Midfielder

Team information
- Current team: Saipa
- Number: 10

Senior career*
Years	Team	Apps	(Gls)
2010–2013	Naft Novin	30	(12)
2013–2015	Parseh Tehran	33	(6)
2015–2016	Siah Jamegan	10	(0)
2016	Sanat Naft	3	(0)
2016–2017	Nassaji	19	(1)
2017–2019	Naft Masjed Soleyman FC	47	(10)
2019	Saipa	8	(0)
2019–2020	Aluminium Arak	14	(8)
2020–2021	Mes Kerman	30	(9)
2021–2022	Havadar	14	(0)
2022–2023	Naft Masjed Soleyman	32	(1)
2024–	Saipa	30	(6)
- * Club domestic league appearances and goals as of 22 April 2025

Seyed Peyman Miri (Persian: سيد پيمان ميری; born 29 November 1992) is an Iranian football forward who plays for Saipa in the Azadegan League.
