= Mehrdad Solhi =

Iranian footballer

Mehrdad Solhi (مهرداد صلحی born May 3, 1991) is an Iranian soccer player who plays for Padideh FC as a forward.

== Background ==
Solhi was born to Fariba and Mohammad Solhi in Tehran, Iran. He has an older brother and a younger sister. His parents both reside in Tehran. His father, a wrestler, entered local competitions before wrestling for the Asian Cup.
