= Hassan Eslami =

Iranian footballer

Personal information
- Date of birth: 23 March 1984 (age 42)
- Place of birth: Tehran, Iran
- Position: Defender

Youth career
- –2005: Paykan

Senior career*
Years	Team	Apps	(Gls)
2005–2012	Paykan	32	(1)
2012–2013	Saipa	5	(0)
2013–2014	Parseh Tehran	7	(0)
- * Club domestic league appearances and goals

Hassan Eslami (Persian: حسن اسلامی; born 23 March 1984) is an Iranian former footballer.

== Career ==
Eslami joined Saipa in 2012 after spending previous season with Paykan.

=== Club career statistics ===
As of 20 July 2012

Club performance			League		Cup		Continental		Total	
Season	Club	League	Apps	Goals	Apps	Goals	Apps	Goals	Apps	Goals
Iran			League		Hazfi Cup		Asia		Total	
2009–10	Paykan	Pro League	4	0			-	-		
2010–11	Paykan	Pro League	12	0			-	-		
2011–12	Paykan	Division 1	16	1			-	-		
2012–13	Saipa	Pro League	1	0	0	0	-	-	1	0
Career total			33	1						
