= Hamed Zamani =

Iranian footballer

Personal information
- Date of birth: 21 March 1989 (age 37)
- Place of birth: Gorgan, Iran
- Height: 1.76 m (5 ft 9 in)
- Positions: Left back; winger

Senior career*
Years	Team	Apps	(Gls)
2009–2010	Etka Gorgan		
2010–2013	Rahian Kermanshah		
2013–2016	Rah Ahan	38	(0)
2014–2015	→ Nirooye Zamoni (loan)	9	(0)
2016–2017	Khooneh	10	(0)
2017–2019	Gol Gohar	24	(0)
2019–2020	Havadar	5	(0)
- * Club domestic league appearances and goals

Hamed Zamani (Persian: حامد زمانی; born 21 March 1989) is an Iranian former football defender.

== Club career ==
In the summer of 2013, he joined Rah Ahan. In 2014, he was suspended by the club because of problems with military conscription, which is compulsory for Iranian men upon reaching the age of 18. Eventually, he was exempted to join Nirooye Zamoni to spend out his conscription period. In the winter of 2015, he rejoined Rah Ahan.

== Club career statistics ==
As of 28 December 2015.

Club	Division	Season	League		Hazfi Cup		Asia		Total	
Club	Division	Season	Apps	Goals	Apps	Goals	Apps	Goals	Apps	Goals
Rahian Kermanshah	Division 1	2012–13	18	1	0	0	–	–	18	1
Rah Ahan	Pro League	2013–14	25	0	3	0	–	–	28	0
Nirooye Zamoni	Division 2	2015–16	9	0	1	0	–	–	10	0
Rah Ahan	Pro League	2014–15	1	0	0	0	–	–	1	0
Career Totals			53	1	4	0	0	0	57	1
