= Mohammad Mad Malisi =

Iranian footballer

Personal information
- Full name: Mohammad Mad Malisi
- Date of birth: January 21, 1993 (age 33)
- Place of birth: Ahvaz, Iran
- Position: Defender

Team information
- Current team: Naft Masjed Soleyman
- Number: 15

Youth career
- 2008–2013: Esteghlal Ahvaz
- 2013–2014: Esteghlal Khuzestan

Senior career*
Years	Team	Apps	(Gls)
2011–2013	Esteghlal Ahvaz	37	(0)
2013–2014	Esteghlal Khuzestan	0	(0)
2014–	Naft Masjed Soleyman	3	(0)
- * Club domestic league appearances and goals as of 31 October 2014

Mohammad Mad Malisi (Persian: محمد مدملیسی) is an Iranian football defender who plays for Naft Masjed Soleyman in the Iran Pro League.

== Club career ==
Mad Malisi started his career with Esteghlal Ahvaz from youth levels. He was promoted to the first team after relegation to Division 2 in 2011. He was a regular starter in his first season with Esteghlal Ahvaz while he helped them to gain promotion to Division 1. In summer 2013 he joined Esteghlal Khuzestan with a 3-year contract but failed to make any appearances for them. He joined Naft Masjed Soleyman in summer 2014 and made his debut for them on 19 September 2014 against Naft Tehran as a starter.

== Club career statistics ==
As of 31 October 2014.

Club	Division	Season	League		Hazfi Cup		Asia		Total	
Club	Division	Season	Apps	Goals	Apps	Goals	Apps	Goals	Apps	Goals
Esteghlal; Ahvaz	Division 2	2011–12	18	0	0	0	–	–	18	0
Esteghlal; Ahvaz	Division 1	2012–13	19	0	1	0	–	–	20	0
Esteghlal Kh.	Pro League	2013–14	0	0	0	0	–	–	0	0
Naft MIS	Pro League	2014–15	3	0	2	0	–	–	5	0
Career Totals			40	0	3	0	0	0	43	0
