= Mohammad Hossein Mehrazma =

Iranian footballer (born 1988)

Personal information
- Full name: Mohammad Hossein Mehrazma
- Date of birth: September 16, 1988 (age 38)
- Place of birth: Tehran, Iran
- Height: 1.75 m (5 ft 9 in)
- Position: Winger

Team information
- Current team: Naft Tehran

Senior career*
| Years | Team | Apps | (Gls) |
| –2009 | Kowsar Tehran F.C. | . | |
| 2009–2013 | Naft Tehran | 81 | (15) |
| 2013–2014 | Padideh | 25 | (0) |
| 2014–2015 | Tractor Sazi | 14 | (0) |
| 2016–2017 | Moghavemat Tehran | 24 | (3) |
| 2017– | Naft Tehran | 0 | (0) |

International career
| 2010–2013 | Iran U-23 | 4 | (0) |
- * Club domestic league appearances and goals

Mohammad Hossein Mehrazma is an Iranian footballer who currently plays for Naft Tehran in the Persian Gulf Pro League.

== Club career ==
Alishah has played with Naft Tehran since 2009.

In July 2014, Mehrazma went on trial with Azerbaijan Premier League side AZAL.

=== Club career statistics ===
| Club performance | | | League | | Cup | | Continental | | Total | |
| Season | Club | League | Apps | Goals | Apps | Goals | Apps | Goals | Apps | Goals |
| Iran | | | League | | Hazfi Cup | | Asia | | Total | |
|---|---|---|---|---|---|---|---|---|---|---|
| 2009–10 | Naft Tehran | Division 1 | 26 | 1 | | 0 | - | - | | 1 |
| 2010–11 | Naft Tehran | Pro League | 27 | 1 | 1 | 0 | - | - | 28 | 1 |
| 2012–13 | Naft Tehran | Pro League | 25 | 4 | 0 | 0 | - | - | 25 | 4 |
| 2012–13 | Naft Tehran | Pro League | 25 | 2 | 0 | 0 | - | - | 3 | 3 |
| 2013–14 | Padideh | Division 1 | 4 | 0 | 1 | 0 | - | - | 5 | 0 |
| 2013–14 | Pro League | Tractor Sazi | 8 | 0 | 2 | 0 | 2 | 0 | 12 | 0 |
| Career total | | | 116 | 8 | | | 2 | 0 | | |

== Honours ==
Tractor Sazi

- Hazfi Cup (1): 2013–14
