= Rouzbeh Sinaki =

Iranian footballer

Personal information
- Full name: Roozbeh Sinaki
- Date of birth: 8 February 1986 (age 40)
- Place of birth: Tehran, Iran
- Height: 1.85 m (6 ft 1 in)
- Position: Goalkeeper

Senior career*
Years	Team	Apps	(Gls)
2017	F.C. Pars Jonoubi Jam	23	(0)
2018–	Gol Gohar Sirjan F.C.	88	(0)

International career^{‡}
2017–18	Iran U-17	4	(0)
2022–23	Iran U-23	5	(0)
- * Club domestic league appearances and goals as of 01:42, 18 October 2023 (UTC) ‡ National team caps and goals as of 01:42, 18 October 2023 (UTC)

Roozbeh Sinaki (Persian: روزبه سینکی; born 8 February 1986) is an Iranian footballer who plays as a goalkeeper for Persian Gulf Pro League side Be'sat Kermanshah.

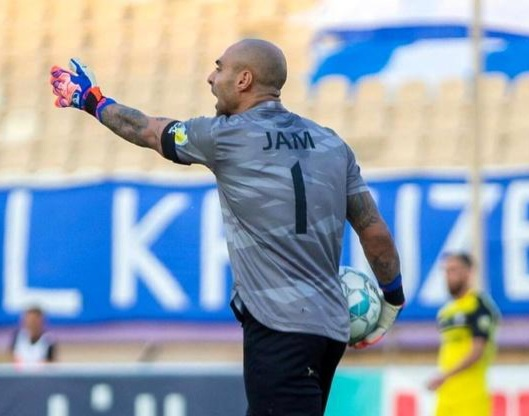
rouzbeh sinaki in Pars Jonoubi Jam

== International career ==
Sinaki played on the Iran national under-17 football team in 2012 and the under-23 team in 2012.

== Club career ==
Sinaki started his career playing in the Azadegan League with F.C. Pars Jonoubi Jam for the 2019–2020 season, after which he signed to play with Gol Gohar Sirjan F.C. in the Persian Gulf Pro League.

As of 17 October 2023
Club	Season	League		
Club	Season	Division	Apps	Goals
Gol Gohar Sirjan F.C.	2019-20	Azadegan League	0	0
Gol Gohar Sirjan F.C.	2020-21	Persian Gulf Pro League	3	0
Gol Gohar Sirjan F.C.	2021-22	Persian Gulf Pro League	27	0
Gol Gohar Sirjan F.C.	2022-23	Persian Gulf Pro League	11	0
Gol Gohar Sirjan F.C.	2023-24	Persian Gulf Pro League	3	0
Career total			44	0

== Personal life ==
On 25 January 2026, it was revealed on Sinaki's Instagram page that he was arrested during the 2025–2026 Iranian protests. The story was deleted minutes later, but follow-ups indicate that there is no word on Sinaki's condition. He had previously written the names of Mahsa Amini, Nika Shakarami, and Hadis Najafi on his armband during the Mahsa Amini protests.
