= Mohammad Hadi Yaghoubi =

Iranian footballer

Hesam Yaghoubi
Personal information
- Full name: Mohammad Hadi Yaghoubi
- Date of birth: 29 March 1991 (age 35)
- Place of birth: Khomam, Iran
- Position: Winger

Youth career
- 2003–2005: Malavan
- 2005–2007: Shahrdari Khomam
- 2007–2012: Malavan

Senior career*
Years	Team	Apps	(Gls)
2011–2015	Malavan	13	(0)
2013–2014	→ Gahar (loan)	18	(0)
2014–2015	Shahrdari Bandar Abbas		
2015–2016	Naft Masjed Soleyman		
2016	Damash		

International career
2011	Iran U-20		
- * Club domestic league appearances and goals as of 30 August 2014 (UTC)

Mohammad Hadi "Hesam" Yaghoubi (born March 29, 1991) is an Iranian footballer.

== Club career ==
Yaghoubi Started his career with Malavan from youth levels. He was promoted to the first team in mid-2011.

== Club career statistics ==
As of 10 April 2014.

Club	Division	Season	League		Hazfi Cup		Asia		Total	
Club	Division	Season	Apps	Goals	Apps	Goals	Apps	Goals	Apps	Goals
Malavan	Pro League	2011–12	0	0	0	0	–	–	0	0
Malavan	Pro League	2012–13	7	0	0	0	–	–	7	0
Malavan	Pro League	2013–14	0	0	0	0	–	–	0	0
Gahar	Division 1	2013–14	18	0	0	0	–	–	18	0
Malavan	Pro League	2014–15	6	0	0	0	–	–	6	0
Career total			31	0	0	0	0	0	31	0
