= Bahman Maleki =

Iranian footballer

Personal information
- Date of birth: 11 February 1992 (age 34)
- Place of birth: Isfahan, Iran
- Height: 1.83 m (6 ft 0 in)
- Position: Defender

Team information
- Current team: Parsian Dezful

Youth career
- –2012: Zob Ahan

Senior career*
Years	Team	Apps	(Gls)
2011–2013	Zob Ahan	14	(0)
2013–2015	Fajr Sepasi	9	(0)
2015	Naft Masjed Soleyman	1	(0)
2015–2016	Giti Pasand	17	(0)
2016–2017	Naft Novin		
2017–2018	Kheybar		
2018	Sardar Bukan		
2020–2024	Esteghlal Shush		
2024–	Parsian Dezful		

International career^{‡}
2009	Iran U–17	3	(0)
2009–2010	Iran U–20	1	(0)
- * Club domestic league appearances and goals as of 16 May 2016 ‡ National team caps and goals as of 15 September 2012

Bahman Maleki (Persian: بهمن مالکی; born 11 February 1992) is an Iranian footballer who plays for Parsian Dezful.

== Club career ==
Maleki began his career at Zob Ahan.

== Club career statistics ==
As of 29 August 2012

Club performance			League		Cup		Continental		Total	
Season	Club	League	Apps	Goals	Apps	Goals	Apps	Goals	Apps	Goals
Iran			League		Hazfi Cup		Asia		Total	
2011–12	Zob Ahan	Pro League	7	0	0	0	0	0	7	0
2012–13	Zob Ahan	Pro League	3	0	0	0	–		3	0
Career total			10	0	0	0	0	0	10	0
