= Hadi Rekabi =

Iranian footballer

Personal information
- Full name: Hadi Rekabi
- Date of birth: 29 March 1985 (age 41)
- Place of birth: Babolsar, Iran
- Position: Midfielder

Team information
- Current team: Nassaji
- Number: 2

Youth career
- 2008: Naft Tehran

Senior career*
Years	Team	Apps	(Gls)
2009–2012	Naft Tehran	19	(1)
2012	Gahar Zagros	9	(0)
2012–2014	Sang Ahan/ Yazd Louleh	20	(3)
2014	Naft Gachsaran	8	(0)
2015	Saipa	3	(0)
2015–	Nassaji	0	(0)
- * Club domestic league appearances and goals as of 12 July 2015 ‡ National team caps and goals as of August 16, 2010

Hadi Rekabi (Persian: هادی رکابی; born March 29, 1985) is an Iranian footballer who plays for Nassaji in the Azadegan League.

== Club career ==
Rekabi started his career with Naft Tehran.
