= Kazem Borjlou =

Iranian footballer

Personal information
- Full name: Kazem Borjlou
- Date of birth: November 22, 1980 (age 45)
- Place of birth: Iran
- Position: Defender

Team information
- Current team: Rah Ahan
- Number: 6

Youth career
- Saipa

Senior career*
Years	Team	Apps	(Gls)
2005–2009	Saipa	86	(4)
2009–2012	Steel Azin	59	(2)
2012–2013	Saipa	13	(0)
2013–2014	Paykan	19	(0)
2014–2015	F.C. Khooneh Be Khooneh	?	(?)
2015–	Rah Ahan Yazdan F.C.	?	(?)

Managerial career
- 2019–: Saipa (assistant manager)
- * Club domestic league appearances and goals as of 10 May 2014

Kazem Borjlou (born November 22, 1980) is an Iranian footballer.

== Career ==
Borjlou joined Steel Azin F.C. in 2009 after spending his entire career with Saipa F.C. He rejoined Saipa in summer 2012 with a two-years contract.

=== Club career statistics ===
As of 10 May 2014

Club performance			League		Cup		Continental		Total	
Season	Club	League	Apps	Goals	Apps	Goals	Apps	Goals	Apps	Goals
Iran			League		Hazfi Cup		Asia		Total	
2005–06	Saipa	Pro League	17	0			-	-		
2006–07	Saipa	Pro League	15	1			-	-		
2007–08	Saipa	Pro League	29	2			6	0		
2008–09	Saipa	Pro League	25	1	1	0	-	-	26	1
2009–10	Steel Azin	Pro League	24	0			-	-		
2010–11	Steel Azin	Pro League	17	0	3	0	-	-	20	0
2011–12	Steel Azin	Division 1	18	2			-	-		
2012–13	Saipa	Pro League	13	0	0	0	-	-	13	0
2013–14	Paykan	Division 1	19	0	0	0	-	-	19	0
Career total			177	6			6	0		
