= Ehsan Abdi =

Iranian footballer

Personal information
- Full name: Ehsan Abdi Gourabi
- Date of birth: 26 June 1986 (age 40)
- Place of birth: Tehran, Iran
- Height: 1.74 m (5 ft 9 in)
- Position: Defensive midfielder

Youth career
- Nassaji Mazandaran

Senior career*
Years	Team	Apps	(Gls)
2011–2013	Nassaji Mazandaran	17	(1)
2013–2014	Aluminiumum Hormozgan	18	(3)
2014	Naft Masjed Soleyman	6	(0)
2014–2015	Mes Kerman	17	(0)
2015–2016	Sanat Naft	2	(17)
2016–2017	Sepidrood	16	(0)
2017–2018	Shahrdari Tabriz	2	(0)
2018–2019	Chooka Talesh	7	(0)
2019–2020	Shahrdari Fuman	2	(1)
2020–2021	Shahrvand Ramsar		
2021	Sepidrood	0	(0)
- * Club domestic league appearances and goals

Ehsan Abdi Gourabi (Persian: احسان عبدی گورابی; born 26 June 1986) is an Iranian former footballer who played as a defensive midfielder. He started his career with Nassaji Mazandaran.

== Club career ==
=== Nassaji Mazandaran ===
Ehsan started his debut against Parseh Tehran with a 1–1 draw. After weeks he was used as a starting 11 and played with his best.

=== Naft Masjed Soleyman ===
Ehsan started his debut a 0–2 defeat against Esteghlal, he got subbed in for Milad Zeneyedpour in 84th minute but failed to keep a goal away from Esteghlal.
