= Mehran Jafari =

Iranian footballer

Personal information
- Full name: Mehran Jafari Aghbelagh
- Date of birth: 27 April 1985 (age 41)
- Place of birth: Khalkhal, Iran
- Position: Midfielder

Team information
- Current team: Shahrdari Ardabil

Youth career
- Malavan

Senior career*
Years	Team	Apps	(Gls)
2005–2012	Malavan	125	(6)
2012–2013	Alvand Hamedan	11	(3)
2013–2014	Gahar Zagros	12	(1)
2014–2015	Aluminium Arak		
2015–	Shahrdari Ardabil	0	(0)
- * Club domestic league appearances and goals as of 10 May 2013

Mehran Jafari (born April 27, 1985) is an Iranian footballer who plays for Shahrdari Ardabil in Azadegan League.

== Club career ==
Until 2012 Jafari played his entire career with Malavan.

=== Club career statistics ===
As of 10 May 2013

Club performance			League		Cup		Total	
Season	Club	League	Apps	Goals	Apps	Goals	Apps	Goals
Iran			League		Hazfi Cup		Total	
2005–06	Malavan	Pro League	1	0				
2006–07	Malavan	Pro League	20	0				
2007–08	Malavan	Pro League	20	0	1	0	21	0
2008–09	Malavan	Pro League	27	3	1	0	28	1
2009–10	Malavan	Pro League	24	3	0	0	24	3
2010–11	Malavan	Pro League	17	0	1	0	18	0
2011–12	Malavan	Pro League	12	0				
2012–13	Malavan	Pro League	4	0		0		0
2012–13	Alvand Hamedan	1st Division	11	3	–	–	11	3
2013–14	Gahar Zagros	1st Division	12	1	–	–	12	1
Career total			148	10				

- Assist Goals

Season	Team	Assists
10/11	Malavan	2
11/12	Malavan	0
