= Mostafa Ahmadi (footballer) =

Iranian footballer

Personal information
- Date of birth: 14 March 1988 (age 38)
- Place of birth: Baneh, Iran
- Height: 1.81 m (5 ft 11 in)
- Position: Midfielder

Team information
- Current team: Havadar
- Number: 7

Senior career*
Years	Team	Apps	(Gls)
2010–2011	Shahrdari Tabriz	0	(0)
2011–2012	Gosatresh Foulad Sahand		
2012–2013	Parseh	18	(0)
2013–2015	Shahrdari Tabriz	21	(0)
2015–2018	Siah Jamegan	74	(0)
2018–2020	Sanat Naft	50	(0)
2020–2023	Aluminium Arak	79	(0)
2023–2024	Shams Azar	1	(0)
2024	Sanat Naft	10	(0)
2024–	Havadar	10	(0)
- * Club domestic league appearances and goals as of 1 November 2024

Mostafa Ahmadi (Persian: مصطفی احمدی; born 14 March 1988) is an Iranian football midfielder who plays for Havadar in the Persian Gulf Pro League.

== Club career ==
After spending most of his career years with Tabrizi sides, Ahmadi joined Siah Jamegan in summer 2015. He made his debut for Siah Jamegan on 30 July 2015 against Esteghlal as a starter.

== Personal life ==
On 23 February 2026, while playing for Havadar, Ahmadi could be seen refusing to celebrate a goal scored by his teammate Amin Ghaseminejad against Fard Alborz, in solidarity with those killed in the 2025–2026 Iranian protests.

== Club career statistics ==
As of 30 July 2015.

Club	Division	Season	League		Hazfi Cup		Asia		Total	
Club	Division	Season	Apps	Goals	Apps	Goals	Apps	Goals	Apps	Goals
Parseh	Division 1	2012–13	18	0	1	0	–	–	19	0
Shahrdari Tabriz	Division 1	2014–15	21	0	0	0	–	–	21	0
Siah Jamegan	Pro League	2015–16	1	0	0	0	–	–	1	0
Career totals			40	0	1	0	0	0	41	0
