= Milad Jafari =

Iranian footballer

Personal information
- Full name: Milad Jafari
- Date of birth: July 11, 1989 (age 37)
- Place of birth: Iran
- Position: Midfielder

Team information
- Current team: Esteghlal Ahvaz
- Number: 11

Senior career*
Years	Team	Apps	(Gls)
2011–2013	Shahrdari Yasuj	18	(3)
2013–2014	Naft Gachsaran	17	(1)
2014–2015	Naft Masjed Soleyman	21	(1)
2015–2016	Esteghlal Ahvaz	0	(3)
2016–	Mes Kerman	0	(0)
- * Club domestic league appearances and goals

Milad Jafari (born 11 July 1989) is an Iranian footballer who currently plays for the Persian Gulf Pro League side Esteghlal Ahvaz.

== Club career ==
=== Naft Gachsaran ===
Milad debuted for Naft Gachsaran in a game against Parseh Tehran. He played 17 games in the Azadegan League for Naft Gachsaran.

=== Naft Masjed Soleyman ===
Milad signed a one-year deal with Naft Masjed Soleyman on 5 January 2014.
