= Meisam Aghababaei =

Iranian footballer

Personal information
- Full name: Meisam Aghababaei
- Place of birth: Iran
- Position: Defender

Youth career
- 2008–2009: Naft Tehran

Senior career*
Years	Team	Apps	(Gls)
2005–2009	Saipa		
2009–2013	Naft Tehran		
2013–2014	Foolad Yazd		
2015–2018	Gol Reyhan Alborz		
2018–2019	Khooneh Be Khooneh		
2019	Moghavemat Tehran		
- * Club domestic league appearances and goals as of 6 May 2012 (UTC)

Meisam Aghababaei is an Iranian footballer who most recently plays for Naft Tehran in the IPL.

== Club career ==
Aghababaei has played with Naft Tehran since 2009.

=== Club Career Statistics ===
Club performance			League		Cup		Continental		Total	
Season	Club	League	Apps	Goals	Apps	Goals	Apps	Goals	Apps	Goals
Iran			League		Hazfi Cup		Asia		Total	
2009–10	Naft Tehran	Division 1	?	0		0	-	-		0
2010–11	Naft Tehran	Pro League	18	0	1	0	-	-	19	0
2011–12	Naft Tehran	Pro League	24	0	0	0	-	-	24	0
2012–13	Naft Tehran	Pro League	0	0	0	0	-	-	0	0
Career total				0			0	0		
