= Kheyrollah Veisi =

Iranian footballer

Personal information
- Full name: Kheyrollah Veisi Ara
- Date of birth: 21 September 1988 (age 38)
- Place of birth: Ramhormoz, Iran
- Position: Defender

Senior career*
Years	Team	Apps	(Gls)
2007–2010	Esteghlal Ahvaz	12	(0)
2010–2011	Moghavemat Tehran		
2011–2013	Foolad	10	(0)
2013–2014	Naft Masjed Soleyman	5	(0)
- * Club domestic league appearances and goals as of 10 May 2014

Kheyrollah Veisi (Persian: خیرالله ویسی) is an Iranian footballer.

== Club career ==
Veisi joined Foolad F.C. in summer 2011.

=== Club career statistics ===
As of 31 January 2014.

Club	Division	Season	League		Hazfi Cup		Asia		Total	
Club	Division	Season	Apps	Goals	Apps	Goals	Apps	Goals	Apps	Goals
Esteghlal; Ahvaz	Pro League	2007–08	3	0			–	–		
Esteghlal; Ahvaz	Pro League	2008–09	5	0			–	–		
Esteghlal; Ahvaz	Pro League	2009–10	4	0			–	–		
Foolad	Pro League	2011–12	10	0	2	0	–	–	12	0
Foolad	Pro League	2012–13	0	0	0	0	–	–	0	0
Naft MIS	Division 1	2013–14	5	0	0	0	–	–	5	0
Career total			27	0			0	0		
