= Meisam Rezapour =

Iranian football player (born 1981)

Meysam Rezapour
Personal information
- Date of birth: 1 December 1981 (age 44)
- Place of birth: Tehran, Iran
- Position: Midfielder

Senior career*
Years	Team	Apps	(Gls)
2001–2033	Fajr Sepah		
2003–2004	Azarbayejan		
2004–2005	Persepolis	13	(0)
2005–2011	Paykan		
2011–2012	Gostaresh Foulad	24	(2)
2012–2013	Aboomoslem	20	(3)
2013–2015	Padideh	14	(0)

Managerial career
- 2021–2022: Havadar (assistant)
- 2023: Naft MIS (assistant)
- 2023: Iran U23 (assistant)
- 2023–2024: Paykan (assistant)
- * Club domestic league appearances and goals

Meisam Rezapour (Persian: میثم رضاپور; born 1 December 1981) is an Iranian football coach and a former player.

== Club career ==
He began his career in 2003–04 under Ali Parvin's team, Azarbayejan, which was sold to Delvar Afzar Industrial Co. He joined Persepolis in 2004 and played one season at Persepolis. He played for Paykan from 2005 to 2011 before joining Padideh Shandiz.

=== Club Career Statistics ===
Last Update 10 May 2013

Club performance			League		Cup		Total	
Season	Club	League	Apps	Goals	Apps	Goals	Apps	Goals
Iran			League		Hazfi Cup		Total	
2004–05	Persepolis	Pro League	13	0				
2005–06	Paykan	1st Division						
2006–07	Paykan	Pro League	18	1				
2007–08	Paykan	Pro League	30	3				
2008–09	Paykan	Pro League	28	5				
2009–10	Paykan	Pro League	20	3				
2010–11	Paykan	Pro League	22	3	1	0		3
2011–12	Gostaresh	1st Division	24	2				
2012–13	Aboomoslem	1st Division	20	3		0		3
2013–14	Padideh	1st Division	7	0		0		0
2014–15	Padideh	Pro League	0	0	0	0	0	0
Total	Iran							
Career total								

- Assist Goals

Season	Team	Assists
07–08	Paykan	4
08–09	Paykan	3
09–10	Paykan	2
10–11	Paykan	0
