= List of Iranian football transfers summer 2015 =

This is a list of Iranian football transfers for the 2015 summer transfer window. Transfers of Iran Pro League and Azadegan League are listed. Transfer window was opened on June 2, 2015 and will be open until July 21, 2015 for players who played in Iranian clubs. On July 20, Iran League Organisation extends transfer window for players who played in Iranian clubs in season 2014–15 until 28 July 2015. Fifa TMS (for players who played in foreign clubs) was opened on May 30, 2015 and will be open until July 23, 2015.

== Players limits ==
The Iranian Football Clubs who participate in 2015–16 Iranian football different levels are allowed to have up to maximum 35 players in their player lists, which will be categorized in the following groups:

- Up to maximum 18 adult (without any age limit) players
- Up to maximum 9 under-23 players (i.e. the player whose birth is after 1 January 1993).
- Up to maximum 8 under-21 players (i.e. the player whose birth is after 1 January 1995).

== Iran Pro League ==
=== Rules and regulations ===
According to Iran Football Federation rules for 2015–16 Iran Pro League, each Football Club is allowed to take up to maximum 6 new Iranian player from the other clubs who already played in the 2014–15 Iran Pro League season. In addition to these six new players, each club is allowed to take up to maximum 4 non-Iranian new players (at least one of them should be Asian) and up to 3 players from Free agent (who did not play in 2015–16 Iran Pro League season or doesn't list in any 2015–16 League after season's start) during the season. In addition to these players, the clubs are also able to take some new under-23 and under-21 years old players, if they have some free place in these categories in their player lists. Under-23 players should sign in transfer window but under-21 can be signed during the first mid-season. For the first time, in 2015–16 season clubs are allowed to sign Japanese player without foreign players (3+1) limit.

=== Esteghlal ===
Head coach: Parviz Mazloumi
Remaining Pro League quota: 0

In: Note: Flags indicate national team as defined under FIFA eligibility rules; some limited exceptions apply. Players may hold more than one non-FIFA nationality.

No.	Pos.	Nation	Player
11	FW	IRN	Jaber Ansari ^{PL} (from Gostaresh Foulad)
55	DF	IRN	Mohammad Amin Hajmohammadi ^{PL} (from Naft Tehran)
20	DF	IRN	Meysam Majidi ^{PL} (from Esteghlal Khuzestan)
1	GK	IRN	Mehdi Rahmati ^{PL} (from Paykan)
4	DF	IRN	Roozbeh Cheshmi ^{PL} (from Saba Qom)
88	MF	IRN	Farshid Esmaeili (from Fajr Sepasi)
18	MF	BRA	Rivaldo Barbosa (from (Brazil) Figueirense)
8	MF	IRN	Yaghoub Karimi ^{PL} (from Sepahan, previously on loan)
17	MF	IRN	Milad Shabanlou (promoted from Academy)
33	GK	IRN	Amir Hossein Najafi (promoted from Academy)
14	FW	CRO	Pero Pejić (from (Albania) Kukësi)

Out: Note: Flags indicate national team as defined under FIFA eligibility rules; some limited exceptions apply. Players may hold more than one non-FIFA nationality.

No.	Pos.	Nation	Player
80	FW	IRN	Reza Enayati (to Siah Jamegan Khorasan)
1	GK	IRN	Mohsen Forouzan (on loan at Siah Jamegan)
4	DF	IRN	Amir Hossein Sadeghi (to Saba Qom)
99	MF	IRN	Milad Nouri (Released)
32	MF	IRN	Amir Hossein Tahuni (to Nassaji, previously on loan)
16	DF	IRN	Hashem Beikzadeh (to Saba Qom)
—	MF	IRN	Iman Basafa (to Fajr Sepasi, previously on loan at Esteghlal Khuzestan)
26	FW	IRN	Iman Abbaszadeh (Demoted to Academy)
—	MF	IRN	Armin Mirdoraghi (to Esteghlal Ahvaz)
35	DF	IRN	Mehdi Karbalaei (on loan at Khoneh Be Khoneh Mazandaran)
48	DF	IRN	Mohammad Khalili (on loan at Khoneh Be Khoneh Mazandaran)
21	GK	IRN	Farzin Garousian (to Aluminium Hormozgan)
29	FW	IRN	Milad Soleiman Fallah (to Paykan)
27	DF	IRN	Mohammad Reza Soleimani (Released)
18	MF	IRN	Soheyl Asgharzad (to Sanat Sari)

=== Esteghlal Ahvaz ===
Head coach: Siavash Bakhtiarizadeh
Remaining Pro League quota: 0

In: Note: Flags indicate national team as defined under FIFA eligibility rules; some limited exceptions apply. Players may hold more than one non-FIFA nationality.

No.	Pos.	Nation	Player
1	GK	IRN	Parviz Karimi ^{PL} (from Esteghlal Khuzestan)
14	MF	IRN	Shahin Majidi (from Nassaji Mazandaran)
10	MF	IRN	Adel Kolahkaj ^{PL} (from Rah Ahan)
11	MF	IRN	Milad Jafari ^{PL} (from Naft MIS)
7	DF	IRN	Mobin Mirdoraghi (from Persepolis)
2	DF	IRN	Mohsen Hamidi (from PAS Hamedan)
5	DF	IRN	Saeed Salarzadeh ^{PL} (from Naft MIS)
8	FW	IRN	Taleb Reykani (from Sanat Naft)
21	MF	IRN	Reza Ayyar (from Foolad Academy)
9	FW	IRN	Mohammad Gholami ^{PL} (from Padideh)
77	MF	IRN	Gholam Abbas Ashoubi (from Shahrdari Tabriz)
3	MF	IRN	Mohammad-Esmail Nazari (from Parseh Tehran)
13	MF	IRN	Ali Bigdeli (from Iranjavan)
4	DF	IRN	Morteza Mansouri (from Haffari Ahvaz)
6	DF	IRN	Saeed Ghezelagchi ^{PL} (from Padideh)
33	GK	IRN	Behnam Mousavi (from Foolad)
17	MF	IRN	Milad Pakparvar (from Foolad Academy)
19	MF	IRN	Hamzeh Khaziravi (from Foolad Academy)
24	FW	IRN	Reza Bahmaei (from Foolad Academy)
23	DF	IRN	Ali Hosseini ^{PL} (from Paykan)
15		IRN	Peyman Taleshi (from Oghab Tehran)
44	GK	IRN	Ehsan Moradian (from Naft Gachsaran)
18	MF	IRN	Armin Mirdoraghi (from Esteghlal Academy)
22	GK	BRA	Luiz Fernando Claudino dos Santos (from (Brazil) URT)

Out: Note: Flags indicate national team as defined under FIFA eligibility rules; some limited exceptions apply. Players may hold more than one non-FIFA nationality.

No.	Pos.	Nation	Player
—	MF	IRN	Omid Sing (to Siah Jamegan Khorasan)
—	MF	IRN	Reza Jabbari (to Fajr Sepasi – conscription)
—	FW	IRN	Saber Mirghorbani (Released)
1	GK	IRN	Yousef Behzadi (to Naft MIS)
3	DF	IRN	Atabak Namazi (to Naft MIS)
5	DF	IRN	Kheyrollah Veisi (to Naft MIS)
8	MF	IRN	Karim Shaverdi (Released)
12	GK	IRN	Hossein Abdollahzaseh (Released)
18	DF	IRN	Saeid Chahjouei (Released)
19	FW	IRN	Mehdi Vedadi (Released)
20	DF	IRN	Hamed Burbur (to Foolad Yazd)
21	MF	IRN	Iman Reisinasab (to Machine Shahrdari Sazi)
22	GK	IRN	Hadi Zarrin-Saed (to Baadraan Gostar)
23	FW	IRN	Amir Makine Kar (to Karun Ahvaz)
24	MF	IRN	Habib Habibpour (to Sanat Naft Novin)
25	FW	IRN	Javad Feyzollahi (Released)
26	DF	IRN	Ali Hassani Ganji (Released)
27	MF	IRN	Rasoul Savaedi (Released)
4	DF	IRN	Emad Ghasemi (to Mes Rafsanjan)
28	MF	IRN	Ali Goudarzi (to Naft MIS)
—	MF	IRN	Shahrokh Shamsi (Released)
—		IRN	Mohammad Abolhassani (Released)
—		IRN	Mehdi Seifi (Released)
—		IRN	Mohammad Ahmadi (Released)

=== Esteghlal Khuzestan ===
Head coach: Abdollah Veisi
Remaining Pro League quota: 4

In: Note: Flags indicate national team as defined under FIFA eligibility rules; some limited exceptions apply. Players may hold more than one non-FIFA nationality.

No.	Pos.	Nation	Player
10	MF	IRN	Rahim Mehdi Zohaivi (from Sanat Naft)
11	MF	IRN	Hassan Beyt Saeed (from Foolad Novin)
9	FW	IRN	Farshad Janfaza (from Foolad Novin)
23	MF	IRN	Farshad Salarvand (from Mes Rafsanjan)
4	DF	IRN	Danial Mahini (from Iranjavan)
14	DF	EQG	Eduardo Ferreira (from (Brazil) Macaé)
1	GK	BRA	Fernando (from (Brazil) Macaé)
3	DF	IRN	Peyman Shirzadi (from Mes Rafsanjan)
13	DF	IRN	Aghil Kaabi (from Foolad Novin)
22	GK	IRN	Goudarz Davoudi (from Naft Masjed Soleyman)
24	MF	IRN	Ali Asghar Ashouri (from Foolad Novin)
20	DF	IRN	Jalal Abdi ^{PL} (from Naft Masjed Soleyman)
15	FW	IRN	Hakim Nassari ^{PL} (from Saipa)
30	FW	IRN	Heysam Hashemizadeh (promoted from Academy)
31	MF	IRN	Mousa Janadeleh (promoted from Academy)
40	GK	IRN	Hossein Pour Hamidi (promoted from Academy)

Out: Note: Flags indicate national team as defined under FIFA eligibility rules; some limited exceptions apply. Players may hold more than one non-FIFA nationality.

No.	Pos.	Nation	Player
34	MF	IRN	Iman Basafa (loan return to Esteghlal)
9	FW	MLI	Lamine Diawara (Released)
25	DF	IRN	Farzad Jafari (to Malavan – conscription)
3	DF	IRN	Majid Heidari (to Mes Kerman)
19	FW	IRN	Yazdan Abbasian (to Machine Shahrdari Tabriz)
8	MF	IRN	Reza Kardoust (to Aluminum Arak)
11	MF	IRN	Mohammad Reza Mahdavi (Released)
21	MF	IRN	Meysam Baou (to Nassaji)
12	DF	IRN	Milad Rabbani (Released)
10	FW	IRN	Mehdi Momeni (to Naft Tehran)
20	DF	IRN	Meysam Majidi (to Esteghlal)
16	GK	MLI	Soumbeïla Diakité (Released)
1	GK	IRN	Parviz Karimi (to Esteghlal Ahvaz)
4	DF	IRN	Mohammad Ebrahim Khosravi (Released)
24	FW	IRN	Hojjat Chaharmahali (Released)
88	DF	IRN	Mohsen Bayat (to Khoneh Be Khoneh Mazandaran)
99	FW	IRN	Mehdi Seyed Salehi (Released)
13	FW	IRN	Ebrahim Salehi (to Fajr Sepasi – conscription)
14	MF	IRN	Hamed Mohammadi (Released)
22	GK	IRN	Vahid Mashilashi (Demoted to Academy)
29	FW	IRN	Ali Ebrahimpour (Released)
31	DF	IRN	Elyas Vashahi (Demoted to Academy)
32	MF	IRN	Mohammad Ali Safia (to Esteghlal Academy)

=== Foolad ===
Head coach: (Croatia) Dragan Skočić
Remaining Pro League quota: 0

In: Note: Flags indicate national team as defined under FIFA eligibility rules; some limited exceptions apply. Players may hold more than one non-FIFA nationality.

No.	Pos.	Nation	Player
23	FW	IRN	Hossein Maleki ^{PL} (from Naft MIS)
2	MF	IRN	Mehdi Daghagheleh ^{PL} (from Persepolis)
7	MF	IRN	Hossein Ebrahimi ^{PL} (from Naft Tehran)
30	MF	IRN	Mahmoud Motlaghzadeh (promoted from Foolad Academy)
11	MF	IRN	Akbar Imani ^{PL} (from Zob Ahan)
70	DF	IRN	Mohammadreza Khanzadeh ^{PL} (from Persepolis)
17	DF	IRN	Abdollah Nasseri (from Foolad Novin)
33	GK	IRN	Mehrdad Bashagardi (from PAS Hamedan)
88	MF	IRN	Amirhossein Feshangchi ^{PL} (from Paykan)
16	DF	IRN	Aref Aghasi (from Foolad Novin)
—	FW	CMR	Dorge Kouemaha (from (Belgium) Lierse, previously on loan at (Turkey) Denizlispor)

Out: Note: Flags indicate national team as defined under FIFA eligibility rules; some limited exceptions apply. Players may hold more than one non-FIFA nationality.

No.	Pos.	Nation	Player
77	MF	IRN	Mohsen Mosalman (loan return to Zob Ahan)
4	DF	IRN	Ayub Vali (Released)
9	FW	IRN	Iman Mousavi (to Siah Jamegan Khorasan)
2	DF	IRN	Ahmad Alenemeh (Released)
14	MF	IRN	Shahab Karami (to Malavan – conscription)
63	GK	IRN	Ershad Yousefi (to Mes Kerman)
99	FW	IRN	Mohammad Ghazi (to Saba Qom)
7	MF	IRN	Soroush Rafiei (to Tractor Sazi – conscription)
11	MF	IRN	Bakhtiar Rahmani (to Tractor Sazi – conscription)
17	FW	CMR	Aloys Nong (to Naft Tehran)
33	DF	IRN	Soroush Saeidi (to Fajr Sepasi – conscription)
22	GK	IRN	Behnam Mousavi (to Esteghlal Ahvaz)
—	MF	IRN	Reza Ayyar (to Esteghlal Ahvaz)
—	MF	IRN	Milad Pakparvar (to Esteghlal Ahvaz)
—	MF	IRN	Hamzeh Khaziravi (to Esteghlal Ahvaz)
—	FW	IRN	Reza Bahmaei (to Esteghlal Ahvaz)
31	GK	IRN	Milad Homayouni (Released)
—	FW	IRN	Aslan Hosseini (to Aluminium Hormozgan)

=== Gostaresh Foulad ===
Head coach: Faraz Kamalvand
Remaining Pro League quota: 1

In: Note: Flags indicate national team as defined under FIFA eligibility rules; some limited exceptions apply. Players may hold more than one non-FIFA nationality.

No.	Pos.	Nation	Player
99	MF	IRN	Amir Hossein Karimi (on loan from Sepahan)
22	GK	BUL	Georgi Georgiev ^{PL} (from (Moldova) Sheriff Tiraspol, previously on loan at Naft MIS)
20	DF	IRN	Mohammad Nosrati ^{PL} (from Paykan)
11	FW	IRN	Shahram Goudarzi (from Fajr Sepasi)
23	FW	IRN	Dariush Shojaeian (from Bahman Shiraz)
7	MF	IRN	Ayoub Kalantari ^{PL} (from Saba Qom)
6	MF	IRN	Mehdi Kiani ^{PL} (from Tractor Sazi)
66	MF	IRN	Reza Karimi (from (Malaysia) Frenz United)
30	FW	IRN	Meghdad Ghobakhlou (from Sanat Naft)
31	FW	IRN	Shahin Taherkhani (from Persepolis Academy)
33	GK	IRN	Saeed Jabbarnejad (from Shahrdari Urmia)
34		IRN	Saeed Sadeghi (from Damash Tehran Academy)
32		IRN	Meysam Sadeghi (from Free agent)
3	DF	IRN	Mojtaba Tarshiz (from Mes Kerman)
37	FW	IRN	Nima Mokhtari (from Nassaji Academy)
9	FW	BRA	Jacson (from (Brazil) Colo Colo)
90	FW	IRN	Saeid Daghighi ^{PL} (from Paykan)

Out: Note: Flags indicate national team as defined under FIFA eligibility rules; some limited exceptions apply. Players may hold more than one non-FIFA nationality.

No.	Pos.	Nation	Player
22	GK	IRN	Mohammad Nasseri (to Siah Jamegan Khorasan)
9	FW	IRN	Jaber Ansari (to Esteghlal)
6	MF	IRN	Meysam Naghizadeh (to Padideh)
1	GK	IRN	Mehdi Eslami (to Aluminium Arak)
—	FW	IRN	Mohsen Delir (to Siah Jamegan Khorasan, previously at Tractor Sazi — conscription)
36	MF	IRN	Ali Mortezaei (to Shahrdari Tabriz)
25	MF	IRN	Farshad Pourkhanmohammad (to Machine Shahrdari Tabriz)
23	DF	IRN	Rasoul Pirzadeh (to PAS Hamedan)
5	MF	BRA	Leonardo Pimenta (Released)
12	DF	IRN	Adel Sarshar (to Aluminium Hormozgan)
21	DF	IRN	Alireza Mirshafian (Released)
28	MF	BRA	Diogo Orlando (Released)
29	MF	IRN	Hamed Nourollahi (Released)
30	FW	IRN	Mohsen Bayatinia (to (Thailand) Sisaket)
17	MF	IRN	Milad Jahani (to Khoneh Be Khoneh Mazandaran)
16	MF	IRN	Alireza Naghizadeh (on loan at Siah Jamegan Khorasan)
37	FW	IRN	Shakour Parastar (Released)
38	MF	IRN	Arash Ouchlar (on loan at Tractor Sazi Academy)
39	DF	IRN	Reza Khayyerdar (Released)
40	DF	IRN	Amin Taghizadeh (Released)
44	GK	IRN	Shahin Mahmoudi (Demoted to Academy)
—	DF	IRN	Shahriar Shirvand (Released, previously at Tractor Sazi — conscription)

=== Malavan ===
Head coach: Amir Ghalehnoei
Remaining Pro League quota: 4

In: Note: Flags indicate national team as defined under FIFA eligibility rules; some limited exceptions apply. Players may hold more than one non-FIFA nationality.

No.	Pos.	Nation	Player
11	MF	IRN	Shahab Karami (from Foolad – conscription)
18	MF	IRN	Mohammad Nozhati ^{PL} (from Saipa)
—	FW	IRN	Amir Mohammad Madani (from Persepolis — conscription)
1	GK	MDA	Serghei Pașcenco (from (Moldova) Sheriff Tiraspol)
30	FW	IRN	Reza Darvishi ^{PL} (from Naft MIS)
—	FW	IRN	Amir Mohammad Mazloum (from Moghavemat Tehran)
32	MF	IRN	Hossein Shenani (from Foolad Novin)
16	DF	IRN	Farzad Jafari (from Esteghlal Khuzestan – conscription)
21	FW	IRN	Amin Jahan Kohan (from Fajr Sepasi – conscription (originally from Foolad))

Out: Note: Flags indicate national team as defined under FIFA eligibility rules; some limited exceptions apply. Players may hold more than one non-FIFA nationality.

No.	Pos.	Nation	Player
3	DF	IRN	Abolhassan Jafari (to Padideh)
13	MF	IRN	Mohsen Yousefi (to Padideh)
1	GK	IRN	Iman Sadeghi (to Persepolis)
21	MF	IRN	Mohammad Darabi (Released)
23	DF	IRN	Shayan Kargar (to Naft MIS)
32	FW	IRN	Rouhollah Arab (to Aluminum Arak)
34	FW	IRN	Farid Mokhtari (to Gitipasand)
35	MF	IRN	Reza Etemadi (to Aluminum Arak)
88	FW	IRN	Foad Agahei (to Baadran Gostar)
17	MF	IRN	Milad Jalali (Released)

=== Naft Tehran ===
Head coach: Alireza Mansourian
Remaining Pro League quota: 2

In: Note: Flags indicate national team as defined under FIFA eligibility rules; some limited exceptions apply. Players may hold more than one non-FIFA nationality.

No.	Pos.	Nation	Player
8	MF	IRN	Hamid Bou Hamdan (previously on loan at Naft Masjed Soleyman)
3	DF	BRA	Carlos Santos ^{PL} (from Zob Ahan)
7	FW	IRN	Mehdi Momeni ^{PL} (from Esteghlal Khuzestan)
15	DF	IRN	Mohammad Daneshgar (from Fajr Sepasi)
32	FW	IRN	Issa Alekasir (from Aluminium Hormozgan)
11	FW	IRN	Payam Sadeghian ^{PL} (from Persepolis)
4	DF	IRN	Jalal Hosseini (from (Qatar) Al Ahli)
17	FW	CMR	Aloys Nong ^{PL} (from Foolad)
16	MF	IRN	Alireza Sabouri (from Foolad Novin)
25	FW	IRN	Mojtaba Haghdoust (from Karun Ahvaz)

Out: Note: Flags indicate national team as defined under FIFA eligibility rules; some limited exceptions apply. Players may hold more than one non-FIFA nationality.

No.	Pos.	Nation	Player
88	FW	NED	Donovan Deekman (Released)
10	FW	IRN	Gholamreza Rezaei (to Saipa)
5	DF	IRN	Mohammad Amin Hajmohammadi (to Esteghlal)
11	MF	IRN	Kamal Kamyabinia (to Perspolis)
7	MF	IRN	Hossein Ebrahimi (to Foolad)
20	DF	BRA	Leandro Padovani (to Sepahan)
8	MF	CMR	David Wirikom (Released)
17	DF	IRN	Bahram Dabbagh (to Nassaji)
41	FW	IRN	Yousef Arj (Released)
43	MF	IRN	Saeid Ghomi (to Saba Qom)
45	FW	IRN	Mohammad Pak Nahad (Released)
44	MF	IRN	Farid Mohammadizadeh (to Tractor Sazi Academy — conscription)
12	GK	IRN	Ali Mohsenzadeh (on loan at Khoneh Be Khoneh)

=== Padideh ===
Head coach: Mohammadreza Mohajeri
Remaining Pro League quota: 1

In: Note: Flags indicate national team as defined under FIFA eligibility rules; some limited exceptions apply. Players may hold more than one non-FIFA nationality.

No.	Pos.	Nation	Player
17	DF	IRN	Abolhassan Jafari ^{PL} (from Malavan)
18	MF	IRN	Meysam Naghizadeh ^{PL} (from Gostaresh Foulad)
77	DF	IRN	Ali Nademi (from Saipa)
5	DF	IRN	Mahmoud Khamis (from Siah Jamegan Khorasan)
6	MF	IRN	Karim Ahmadi (from Siah Jamegan Khorasan)
88	FW	IRN	Mehrdad Rezaei (from Siah Jamegan Khorasan)
8	MF	IRN	Hossein Badamaki ^{PL} (from Saba Qom)
13	MF	IRN	Mohsen Yousefi ^{PL} (from Malavan)
4	DF	IRN	Hossein Moradmand ^{PL} (on loan from Sepahan)
2	DF	IRN	Aram Abbasi (from Saba Qom)
32	FW	IRN	Mohammad Ali Mardani (from Fajr Sepasi)

Out: Note: Flags indicate national team as defined under FIFA eligibility rules; some limited exceptions apply. Players may hold more than one non-FIFA nationality.

No.	Pos.	Nation	Player
5	MF	IRN	Akbar Sadeghi (to Zob Ahan)
2	DF	IRN	Mohammad Nejad Mehdi (to Zob Ahan)
88	MF	IRN	Mohammadreza Bazaj (to Siah Jamegan Khorasan)
55	DF	IRN	Mohammad Hassan Rajabzadeh (to Paykan)
4	DF	MNE	Milan Jovanović (to Siah Jamegan Khorasan)
27	MF	SRB	Zoran Knežević (to (Serbia) Jagodina)
87	FW	UZB	Bahodir Nasimov (Released)
8	MF	IRN	Reza Haghighi (to Saba Qom)
6	FW	IRN	Mohammad Gholami (to Esteghlal Ahvaz)
28	DF	IRN	Saeed Ghezelagchi (to Esteghlal Ahvaz)
33	MF	IRN	Meisam Rezapour (Released)
40	FW	IRN	Mehdi Nazari (to Paykan)
44	MF	IRN	Hossein Kiani (to Khoneh Be Khoneh Mazandaran)
70	DF	IRN	Mohammad Salsali (Released)
66	FW	IRN	Ali Choupani (Loan return to Sepahan)
32	DF	IRN	Mohammad Valizadeh (Released)
63	DF	IRN	Mohammad Ali Faramarzi (Released)

=== Persepolis ===
Head coach: (Croatia) Branko Ivanković
Remaining Pro League quota: 1

In: Note: Flags indicate national team as defined under FIFA eligibility rules; some limited exceptions apply. Players may hold more than one non-FIFA nationality.

No.	Pos.	Nation	Player
10	MF	IRN	Farshad Ahmadzadeh (from Tractor Sazi – return from conscription)
11	MF	IRN	Kamal Kamyabinia ^{PL} (from Naft Tehran)
27	DF	IRN	Ramin Rezaeian ^{PL} (from Rah Ahan)
23	DF	CRO	Luka Marić (from (Poland) Zawisza Bydgoszcz)
77	MF	IRN	Mohsen Mosalman ^{PL} (from Zob Ahan)
3	DF	IRN	Vahid Heydarieh ^{PL} (from Paykan)
15	DF	IRN	Mohammad Ansari (from Shahrdari Tabriz)
88	GK	IRN	Iman Sadeghi ^{PL} (from Malavan)
17	FW	IRN	Ali Fatemi (from Free agent)
14	FW	HON	Jerry Bengtson (from (United States) New England, previously on loan at (Argentina) Belgrano)

Out: Note: Flags indicate national team as defined under FIFA eligibility rules; some limited exceptions apply. Players may hold more than one non-FIFA nationality.

No.	Pos.	Nation	Player
23	FW	IRN	Shahab Zahedi (Released)
5	DF	IRN	Mehdi Jafarpour (to Rah Ahan)
8	MF	IRN	Mehdi Daghagheleh (to Foolad)
21	MF	IRN	Ali Astani (to Shahrdari Ardabil)
29	DF	IRN	Navid Sabouri (to Shahrdari Ardabil)
10	FW	IRN	Reza Norouzi (to Saipa)
26	MF	IRN	Hamidreza Aliasgari (to Rah Ahan)
11	FW	IRN	Payam Sadeghian (to Naft Tehran)
66	MF	BRA	Fernando Gabriel (to (Saudi Arabia) Al-Faisaly)
15	MF	IRN	Afshin Esmaeilzadeh (to Mes Kerman)
14	MF	IRN	Mohammad Nouri (to (Qatar) Al-Mesaimeer)
3	DF	IRN	Mohammadreza Khanzadeh (to Foolad)
35	FW	IRN	Amir Mohammad Madani (to Malavan – conscription)
—	FW	IRN	Shahin Taherkhani (to Gostaresh Foulad)
30	DF	IRN	Mobin Mirdoraghi (to Esteghlal Ahvaz)
—	MF	IRN	Mohammad Amin Rezaei (to Siah Jamegan Khorasan)
22	MF	BRA	Tadeu (to (Brazil) BOA)
44	GK	IRN	Masoud Homami (to PAS Hamedan)

=== Rah Ahan ===
Head coach: Mehdi Tartar
Remaining Pro League quota: 1

In: Note: Flags indicate national team as defined under FIFA eligibility rules; some limited exceptions apply. Players may hold more than one non-FIFA nationality.

No.	Pos.	Nation	Player
14	MF	IRN	Hamidreza Aliasgari ^{PL} (from Persepolis)
9	DF	IRN	Ahmad Mehdizadeh ^{PL} (from Saba Qom)
77	FW	IRN	Hossein Karimi ^{PL} (from Paykan)
12	MF	IRN	Mehdi Jafarpour ^{PL} (from Persepolis)
16	MF	IRN	Mehran Ghasemi (from Giti Pasand)
26	MF	IRN	Milad Taji (from Shahrdari Bandar Abbas)
2	DF	IRN	Alireza Mohammad (from Khoneh Be Khoneh Mazandaran)
6	DF	IRN	Kazem Borjlou (from Khoneh Be Khoneh Mazandaran)
31	DF	IRN	Amir Reza Nasr Azadani (from Sepahan Academy)
22	GK	IRN	Mohammad Ali Ramezanian (from Tractor Sazi)
18	DF	IRN	Hamidreza Divsalar ^{PL} (from Paykan)
15	FW	IRN	Mohammad Hossein Babagoli (from Nassaji Academy)
28	MF	IRN	Hossein Kheyri (from Saipa Academy)
35	FW	IRN	Salar Lalani
33	GK	IRN	Ali Shafiei (from Patouye Laleh Isfahan Academy)
32	DF	IRN	Abbas Mazrouei (from Rahian Kermanshah)
99	MF	IRN	Ali Aminorayayi (from Arad Isfahan)
88	DF	IRN	Hamidreza Taherkhani (from Persepolis Academy)
66	MF	IRN	Mehran Asgari (from Parseh Academy)
38	MF	FIN	Sebastian Strandvall (from Austria Lustenau)

Out: Note: Flags indicate national team as defined under FIFA eligibility rules; some limited exceptions apply. Players may hold more than one non-FIFA nationality.

No.	Pos.	Nation	Player
27	DF	IRN	Ramin Rezaeian (to Persepolis)
88	MF	IRN	Adel Kolahkaj (to Esteghlal Ahvaz)
99	MF	UGA	Martin Mutumba (to (Sweden) Brommapojkarna)
22	GK	IRN	Amir Abedzadeh (Released)
4	DF	IRN	Sheys Rezaei (Released)
13	DF	IRN	Shervin Razminia (Released)
19	FW	IRN	Mojtaba Shiri (to Paykan)
21	DF	IRN	Mehdi Zarei (Released)
32	GK	IRN	Mohammadreza Khazaeifard (to Aluminium Hormozgan)
37	FW	IRN	Vahid Javanmardi (Released)
38	MF	IRN	Mohsen Mirabi (to Parseh)
39	DF	IRN	Milad Akbari (Released)
77	MF	IRN	Abbas Mohammadrezaei (to Paykan)
2	DF	IRN	Ahmad Mousavi (to Khoneh Be Khoneh Mazandaran)
14	MF	IRN	Mohammad Hosseinpour (to Khoneh Be Khoneh Mazandaran)
15	DF	IRN	Navid Khosh Hava (to Paykan)
17	FW	IRN	Alireza Azimi (to Khoneh Be Khoneh Mazandaran)
31	FW	IRN	Saman Rokhsan (Released)
33	DF	IRN	Mohammad Sattari (to Khoneh Be Khoneh Mazandaran)
44	GK	IRN	Morteza Akhbari (Released)
28	MF	IRN	Khalil Helali (to Paykan)

=== Saba Qom ===
Head coach: Ali Daei
Remaining Pro League quota: 0

In: Note: Flags indicate national team as defined under FIFA eligibility rules; some limited exceptions apply. Players may hold more than one non-FIFA nationality.

No.	Pos.	Nation	Player
1	GK	IRN	Hamed Lak ^{PL} (from Tractor Sazi)
9	MF	IRN	Reza Haghighi ^{PL} (from Padideh)
20	MF	IRN	Saman Aghazamani (from Free agent)
14	DF	IRN	Nima Daghestani (from (Malaysia) Frenz United)
18	FW	IRN	Karim Eslami (from Mes Kerman)
5	MF	IRN	Ghasem Dehnavi ^{PL} (from Zob Ahan)
6	DF	BRA	Filipe Machado (from (Brazil) Macaé)
11	FW	IRN	Mohammad Ghazi ^{PL} (from Foolad)
8	DF	IRN	Amir Hossein Sadeghi ^{PL} (from Esteghlal)
28	DF	IRN	Hashem Beikzadeh ^{PL} (from Esteghlal)
15	DF	IRN	Jahanbakhsh Zabihi Taher (from (Philippines) Global)
23	MF	IRN	Mehdi Hosseini (from Free agent)
27	MF	IRN	Saeid Ghomi (from Naft Tehran)

Out: Note: Flags indicate national team as defined under FIFA eligibility rules; some limited exceptions apply. Players may hold more than one non-FIFA nationality.

No.	Pos.	Nation	Player
55	DF	IRN	Saeid Mehdipour (to Siah Jamegan Khorasan)
5	DF	IRN	Roozbeh Cheshmi (to Esteghlal)
11	MF	IRN	Ayoub Kalantari (to Gostaresh Foulad)
10	MF	IRN	Hossein Badamaki (to Padideh)
20	DF	IRN	Pirouz Ghorbani (Retired)
1	GK	IRN	Mehrdad Tahmasbi (to Tractor Sazi)
28	DF	IRN	Aram Abbasi (to Padideh)
18	MF	IRN	Vahid Aliabadi (to Khoneh Be Khoneh Mazandaran)
32	MF	IRN	Hamid Reza Kazemi (to Gitipasand)
15	MF	IRN	Ehsan Sokhandan (Released)
6	DF	IRN	Hadi Shakouri (to Khoneh Be Khoneh Mazandaran)
34	DF	IRN	Masoud Abarghouei (Released)
44	FW	IRN	Mohammad Heidari (to Damash)
88	FW	IRN	Ghasem Akbari (to Sanat Sari)
24	MF	IRN	Milad Nouri Dijoujin (Released)
25	DF	IRN	Hossein Koushki (Released)
29	FW	IRN	Sajjad Kerman (to (Azerbaijan) Mil-Muğan)
33	FW	IRN	Mohammad Milad Abadi (Released)
—	FW	IRN	Saeed Sadeghi (to Mes Kerman, previously at Niroo Zamini — conscription)
—	FW	IRN	Ahmad Hassanzadeh (to Fajr Sepasi — conscription)

=== Saipa ===
Head coach: Majid Jalali
Remaining Pro League quota: 5

In: Note: Flags indicate national team as defined under FIFA eligibility rules; some limited exceptions apply. Players may hold more than one non-FIFA nationality.

No.	Pos.	Nation	Player
2	DF	IRN	Mohammad Vahid Esmaeilbeigi (from Mes Kerman)
11	FW	IRN	Gholamreza Rezaei ^{PL} (from Naft Tehran)
9	FW	IRN	Reza Norouzi (from Persepolis)
6	MF	IRN	Javad Nekounam (from (Spain) Osasuna)
22	GK	BIH	Ratko Dujković (from (Croatia) Zrinjski Mostar)
28	FW	IRN	Mohammad Soltani Mehr (promoted from Academy)
29	FW	IRN	Mohammad Alinejad (from Pars Jonoubi Jam)

Out: Note: Flags indicate national team as defined under FIFA eligibility rules; some limited exceptions apply. Players may hold more than one non-FIFA nationality.

No.	Pos.	Nation	Player
22	GK	IRN	Mohammadreza Akhbari (to Tractor Sazi — conscription)
28	DF	IRN	Ali Nademi (to Padideh)
2	DF	IRN	Hadi Rekabi (to Mes Kerman)
14	MF	IRN	Mohammad Nozhati (to Malavan)
26	DF	IRN	Masih Zahedi (to Shahrdari Ardabil)
20	MF	IRN	Alireza Alizadeh (to Shahrdari Ardabil)
17	FW	IRN	Hakim Nassari (to Esteghlal Khuzestan)
35	FW	IRN	Amir Hossein Vosough (to Esteghlal Academy)
21	DF	IRN	Mohsen Arzani (to Parseh)
36	DF	IRN	Farshad Ghasemi (to Aluminium Hormozgan)
30	FW	IRN	Reza Jafari (Demoted to Academy)
—	DF	IRN	Hossein Kheyri (to Rah Ahan)

=== Sepahan ===
Head coach: Hossein Faraki
Remaining Pro League quota: 4

In: Note: Flags indicate national team as defined under FIFA eligibility rules; some limited exceptions apply. Players may hold more than one non-FIFA nationality.

No.	Pos.	Nation	Player
2	DF	BRA	Leandro Padovani ^{PL} (from Naft Tehran)
3	DF	IRN	Habib Gordani ^{PL} (from Tractor Sazi)
14	FW	IRN	Vahid Najafi (from Moghavemat Tehran)
22	GK	IRN	Farid Nejat (promoted from Academy)
26	DF	IRN	Ali Ahmadi (promoted from Academy)
68	MF	IRN	Reza Asadi (promoted from Academy)
70	MF	IRN	Hamed Bahiraei (promoted from Academy)
77	FW	IRN	Reza Mirzaei (promoted from Academy)
88	DF	IRN	Aref Gholami (promoted from Academy)

Out: Note: Flags indicate national team as defined under FIFA eligibility rules; some limited exceptions apply. Players may hold more than one non-FIFA nationality.

No.	Pos.	Nation	Player
6	DF	IRN	Mohammad Ali Ahmadi (Released)
14	FW	ALB	Xhevahir Sukaj (to (Albania) FK Partizani)
15	MF	BRA	Márcio Passos (to (Brazil) ABC)
18	DF	IRN	Hossein Moradmand (on loan at Padideh)
99	MF	IRN	Amir Hossein Karimi (on loan at Gostaresh Foulad)
—	MF	IRN	Yaghoub Karimi (to Esteghlal, previously on loan)
—	DF	IRN	Amir Reza Nasr Azadani (to Rah Ahan)
16	FW	IRN	Erfan Maftoolkar (on loan at Giti Pasand)
26	GK	IRN	Mehdi Sedghian (to Fajr Sepasi — conscription)
—	FW	IRN	Ali Choupani (on loan at Khoneh Be Khoneh, previously on loan at Padideh)
25	DF	IRN	Mohsen Aghaei (Released)

=== Siah Jamegan Khorasan ===
Head coach: Rasoul Khatibi
Remaining Pro League quota: 0

In: Note: Flags indicate national team as defined under FIFA eligibility rules; some limited exceptions apply. Players may hold more than one non-FIFA nationality.

No.	Pos.	Nation	Player
5	DF	IRN	Saeid Mehdipour ^{PL} (from Saba Qom)
21	GK	IRN	Mohammad Nasseri (from Gostaresh Foulad)
23	FW	IRN	Peyman Miri (from Parseh)
13	FW	IRN	Sajjad Rahbar (from Machine Shahrdari Tabriz)
20	DF	IRN	Mostafa Ahmadi (from Machine Shahrdari Tabriz)
2	DF	IRN	Amir Tizrou (from Damash)
11	MF	IRN	Omid Sing (from Esteghlal Ahvaz)
88	MF	IRN	Mohammadreza Bazaj (from Padideh)
10	FW	IRN	Reza Enayati ^{PL} (from Esteghlal)
6	DF	MNE	Milan Jovanović ^{PL} (from Padideh)
9	FW	IRN	Mohsen Delir ^{PL} (from Gostaresh Foulad)
70	MF	BRA	Renan Silva (from (United Arab Emirates) Dibba club)
7	MF	IRN	Ahmad Amir Kamdar ^{PL} (from Tractor Sazi)
16	MF	IRN	Alireza Naghizadeh ^{PL} (on loan from Gostaresh Foulad)
3	DF	IRN	Meysam Hosseini (from Free agent)
1	GK	IRN	Mohsen Forouzan ^{PL} (from Esteghlal)
17	FW	IRN	Tomik Davoudian (from Delvarafzar Academy)
19	MF	IRN	Amir Hossein Zoshki (promoted from Academy)
26	MF	IRN	Mohammad Amin Rezaei (from Persepolis Academy)

Out: Note: Flags indicate national team as defined under FIFA eligibility rules; some limited exceptions apply. Players may hold more than one non-FIFA nationality.

No.	Pos.	Nation	Player
—	DF	IRN	Morteza Falahati (Released)
—	FW	IRN	Hadi Kheyri (to Khoneh Be Khoneh Mazandaran)
7	MF	IRN	Hamid Marvi (to Khoneh Be Khoneh Mazandaran)
5	DF	IRN	Mahmoud Khamis (to Padideh)
—	MF	IRN	Karim Ahmadi (to Padideh)
—	FW	IRN	Mehrdad Rezaei (to Padideh)
—	DF	IRN	Vahid Faregh (to Machine Shahrdari Tabriz)
—	DF	IRN	Mahmoud Shaban (to Gol Gohar)
—	DF	IRN	Fakhroddin Gholizadeh (to Payam Mashhad)
—	DF	IRN	Ali Jadidi (Released)
—	MF	IRN	Hossein Naziri (Released)
—	MF	IRN	Morteza Hashemizadeh (to Baadraan Gostar)
—	MF	IRN	Majid Jalalifar (to Gol Gohar)
—	FW	IRN	Saeid Asgharpour (to Payam Mashhad)
—	FW	IRN	Farhad Kheirkhah (to Shahrdari Bandar Abbas)
—	FW	IRN	Arash Homayouni (to Payam Mashhad)
—	FW	IRN	Hamid Gholami (to Foolad Yazd)
—		IRN	Reza Abolfazli (Released)
—		IRN	Mojtaba Fakharizadeh (to Yarane Ghadir Alborz)
—		IRN	Mohammad Seyed Momen (Released)
—		IRN	Soheyl Zandieh (to Aghidati Siasi Nezaja)
—		IRN	Alireza Mahdavi (Released)
—		IRN	Alireza Akbari (Released)
—		IRN	Mehdi Moradian (to Payam Mashhad)
—	DF	IRN	Amin Abbasi (to Khoneh Be Khoneh Mazandaran)

=== Tractor Sazi ===
Head coach: (Portugal) Toni
Remaining Pro League quota: 4

In: Note: Flags indicate national team as defined under FIFA eligibility rules; some limited exceptions apply. Players may hold more than one non-FIFA nationality.

No.	Pos.	Nation	Player
1	GK	IRN	Mohammadreza Akhbari ^{PL} (from Saipa — conscription)
10	MF	IRN	Soroush Rafiei (from Foolad — conscription)
20	MF	IRN	Ahmad Abdollahzadeh (from Niroo Zamini, originally from Foolad — conscription)
11	MF	IRN	Bakhtiar Rahmani (from Foolad — conscription)
22	GK	IRN	Mehrdad Tahmasbi ^{PL} (from Saba Qom)
5	DF	BRA	Carlos Cardoso (from (Azerbaijan) Neftchi)
19	FW	TUN	Hamza Younés (from (Bulgaria) Ludogorets Razgrad)
17	MF	BRA	Augusto César (on loan from (Brazil) Internacional)
18	DF	PHI	Iain Ramsay (from (Australia) Melbourne City)

Out: Note: Flags indicate national team as defined under FIFA eligibility rules; some limited exceptions apply. Players may hold more than one non-FIFA nationality.

No.	Pos.	Nation	Player
27	MF	IRN	Farshad Ahmadzadeh (to Persepolis – return from conscription)
35	FW	IRN	Peyman Babaei (Released)
21	FW	IRN	Mohsen Delir (to Gostaresh Foulad – return from conscription)
44	GK	SEN	Issa Ndoye (Released)
1	GK	IRN	Hamed Lak (to Saba Qom)
3	DF	IRN	Habib Gordani (to Sepahan)
6	MF	IRN	Mehdi Kiani (to Gostaresh Foulad)
33	DF	IRN	Shahriar Shirvand (to Gostaresh Foulad – return from conscription)
13	DF	BRA	Célio (to (United Arab Emirates) Al-Shaab)
10	FW	BRA	Edinho (to (Qatar) Al-Sailiya)
14	MF	IRN	Andranik Teymourian (to (Qatar) Umm Salal)
18	MF	IRN	Ahmad Amir Kamdar (to Siah Jamegan Khorasan)
69	DF	IRN	Mehdi Ghoreishi (to Aluminium Arak)
40	GK	IRN	Mohammad Ali Ramezanian (to Rah Ahan)

=== Zob Ahan ===
Head coach: Yahya Golmohammadi
Remaining Pro League quota: 3

In: Note: Flags indicate national team as defined under FIFA eligibility rules; some limited exceptions apply. Players may hold more than one non-FIFA nationality.

No.	Pos.	Nation	Player
5	MF	IRN	Akbar Sadeghi ^{PL} (from Padideh)
6	DF	IRN	Mohammad Nejad Mehdi ^{PL} (from Padideh)
24	MF	IRN	Reza Shekari (from Moghavemat Tehran)
13	FW	IRN	Mohammad Reza Hosseini (from Fajr Sepasi)
36	DF	IRN	Kianoush Eghbali (promoted from Academy)
32	MF	IRN	Mehran Derakhshan Mehr (promoted from Academy)
35	MF	IRN	Kamran Momeni (promoted from Academy)

Out: Note: Flags indicate national team as defined under FIFA eligibility rules; some limited exceptions apply. Players may hold more than one non-FIFA nationality.

No.	Pos.	Nation	Player
3	DF	BRA	Carlos Santos (to Naft Tehran)
13	DF	IRN	Pouria Seifpanahi (to Machine Shahrdari Tabriz)
4	MF	IRN	Akbar Imani (to Foolad)
5	MF	IRN	Ghasem Dehnavi (to Saba Qom)
7	MF	IRN	Mohsen Mosalman (to Persepolis, previously on loan at Foolad)
10	FW	IRN	Esmaeil Farhadi (Released)
32	FW	IRN	Amin Nasiri (to Gitipasand)
34	MF	IRN	Mohammadreza Baouj (Released)
36	FW	IRN	Farshad Mohammadi (to Gitipasand)

Notes

- ^{PL} Pro League quota.

== Azadegan League ==
=== Rules and regulations ===
According to Iran Football Federation rules for 2015–16 Azadegan League each club is allowed to take up to 3 players from Free agent during the season. In addition to these players, the clubs are also able to take some new under-23 and under-21 years old players, if they have some free place in these categories in their player lists. Under-23 players should sign in transfer window but under-21 can be signed during the first mid-season. Clubs in Azadegan League Couldn't sign any foreign player. There is no limit for signing Iranian players.

=== Aluminium Arak ===
Head coach: Gholamreza Delgarm

In: Note: Flags indicate national team as defined under FIFA eligibility rules; some limited exceptions apply. Players may hold more than one non-FIFA nationality.

No.	Pos.	Nation	Player
—	DF	IRN	Vahid Nemati (from Foolad Yazd)
—	GK	IRN	Milad Jafari (from Esteghlal B)
—	MF	IRN	Sadegh Gashni (from Sanat Naft)
—	MF	IRN	Hamidreza Soleimani (from Mes Rafsanjan)
—	GK	IRN	Mehdi Eslami (from Gostaresh Foulad)
—	DF	IRN	Mehdi Ghoreishi (from Tractor Sazi)
—	MF	IRN	Morteza Mahfouzi (from Machine Shahrdari Tabriz)
—	FW	IRN	Emad Mirjavan (from Sepidrood)
—	MF	IRN	Hossein Ahmadlou (from Foolad Novin)
—	MF	IRN	Reza Etemadi (from Malavan)
—	MF	IRN	Mohammadreza Mahdavi (from Esteghlal Khuzestan)
—	DF	IRN	Abolfazl Ghorbani (from Nassaji)
—	MF	IRN	Reza Kardoust (from Esteghlal Khuzestan)
—	FW	IRN	Mohammad Heidari (from Saba Qom)

Out: Note: Flags indicate national team as defined under FIFA eligibility rules; some limited exceptions apply. Players may hold more than one non-FIFA nationality.

No.	Pos.	Nation	Player
8	FW	IRN	Mehran Jafari (Released)
24	FW	IRN	Mehdi Yarahmadi (Released)
—	MF	IRN	Davoud Haghi (Released)
—	MF	IRN	Javad Razzaghi (Released)
—		IRN	Sajad Javadi (Released)
—		IRN	Shahab Khorshidi (Released)
1	GK	IRN	Hamid Lotfollahnejad (Released)
—	MF	IRN	Pouya Khavarpour (Released)
—		IRN	Mohammad Sadegh Ahmadi (Released)
55	DF	IRN	Mohammad Vizvari (to Kheybar Khorramabad)
—		IRN	Mohammad Ali Akbarkhah (Released)
88	MF	IRN	Peyman Pour Sadeghi (Released)

=== Aluminium Hormozgan ===
Head coach: Davoud Haghdoust

In: Note: Flags indicate national team as defined under FIFA eligibility rules; some limited exceptions apply. Players may hold more than one non-FIFA nationality.

No.	Pos.	Nation	Player

Out: Note: Flags indicate national team as defined under FIFA eligibility rules; some limited exceptions apply. Players may hold more than one non-FIFA nationality.

No.	Pos.	Nation	Player
—	FW	IRN	Issa Alekasir (to Naft Tehran)
—	FW	IRN	Sepehr Roozitalab (Released)
—	DF	IRN	Mohammad Siah (to Shahrdari Ardabil)
—	FW	IRN	Jafar Bazri (to Sanat NaFt)

=== Damash ===
Head coach: Majid Jahanpour

In: Note: Flags indicate national team as defined under FIFA eligibility rules; some limited exceptions apply. Players may hold more than one non-FIFA nationality.

No.	Pos.	Nation	Player
—	GK	IRN	Ashkan Tavana (from Sepidrood Rasht)
—	MF	IRN	Mohammadreza Almaskhaleh (from Sepidrood Rasht)
—	MF	IRN	Mohammad Jafari (from Sepidrood Rasht)
—	MF	IRN	Hafez Yaghoubi (from Malavan U19)
—	MF	IRN	Mohammad Talebi (from Free agent)
—	GK	IRN	Reza Mohammadi (from Naft Masjed Soleyman)
—	FW	IRN	Mohammad Heydari (from Saba Qom)
—	DF	IRN	Mostafa Hajati (from Sepidrood Rasht)
—	MF	IRN	Alireza Okhravi (from Esteghlal U19)

Out: Note: Flags indicate national team as defined under FIFA eligibility rules; some limited exceptions apply. Players may hold more than one non-FIFA nationality.

No.	Pos.	Nation	Player
2	DF	IRN	Amir Tizrou (to Siah Jamegan Khorasan)
18	MF	IRN	Mohammad Dadresi (to Sepidrood Rasht)
7	MF	IRN	Hamed Pouromrani (to Sepidrood Rasht)
33	GK	IRN	Behnam Laayeghifar (to Sepidrood Rasht)
10	FW	IRN	Afshin Chavoshi (to Sepidrood Rasht)
9	DF	IRN	Saeid Ghadami (Released)
20	MF	IRN	Amin Torkashvand (to Sepidrood Rasht)
16	DF	IRN	Mehdi Kiani (Released)
24	MF	IRN	Vahid Hosseinzade (Released)
34	DF	IRN	Adel Masoudifar (Released)
29	MF	IRN	Kianoosh Mirzaei (to Aluminium Hormozgan)
—	MF	IRN	Hadi Daghagheleh (Released)
—	MF	IRN	Pejman Maleki (Released)

=== Fajr Sepasi ===
Head coach: Ali Asghar Kalantari

In: Note: Flags indicate national team as defined under FIFA eligibility rules; some limited exceptions apply. Players may hold more than one non-FIFA nationality.

No.	Pos.	Nation	Player
—	MF	IRN	Mehdi Karimian (from Free agent)
—	DF	IRN	Reza Moradi (from Foolad Novin – conscription)
—	MF	IRN	Meysam Shahmakvandzadeh (from Foolad Novin – conscription)
—	MF	IRN	Mostafa Mahi (from Foolad Novin – conscription)
—	MF	IRN	Reza Jabbari (from Esteghlal Ahvaz – conscription)
—	MF	IRN	Mohsen Fayazbakhsh (from Iranjavan – conscription)
—	FW	IRN	Shahrokh Gholamrezapour (from Iranjavan – conscription)
—	FW	IRN	Ebrahim Salehi (from Esteghlal Khuzestan – conscription)
—	MF	IRN	Iman Basafa (from Esteghlal)
—	DF	IRN	Soroush Saeidi (from Foolad – conscription)
—	DF	IRN	Farhad Salaripour (from Mes Kerman – conscription)
—	FW	IRN	Ahmad Hassanzadeh (from Saba Qom – conscription)
—	GK	IRN	Mehdi Sedghian (from Sepahan — conscription)

Out: Note: Flags indicate national team as defined under FIFA eligibility rules; some limited exceptions apply. Players may hold more than one non-FIFA nationality.

No.	Pos.	Nation	Player
28	MF	IRN	Meysam Khodashenas (to Nassaji – return from conscription)
—	FW	IRN	Mohammad Ali Mardani (to Padideh)
—	DF	IRN	Mohammad Daneshgar (to Naft Tehran)
—	FW	IRN	Shahram Goudarzi (to Gostaresh Foulad)
—	FW	IRN	Amin Shojaeian (to Nassaji)
21	FW	IRN	Mohammad Reza Hosseini (to Zob Ahan)
20	MF	IRN	Farshid Esmaeili (to Esteghlal)
—	FW	IRN	Arman Ramezani (to PAS Hamedan)
—	FW	IRN	Mohammad Reza Nejat (to Nassaji)
13	FW	IRN	Hamid Jokar (to Nassaji)
4	FW	IRN	Alireza Jalili (to Nassaji)
—	DF	IRN	Armin Monfareddoost (to Damash Gilan)

=== Foolad Yazd ===
Head coach: Mohammad Reza Shirdel

In: Note: Flags indicate national team as defined under FIFA eligibility rules; some limited exceptions apply. Players may hold more than one non-FIFA nationality.

No.	Pos.	Nation	Player

Out: Note: Flags indicate national team as defined under FIFA eligibility rules; some limited exceptions apply. Players may hold more than one non-FIFA nationality.

No.	Pos.	Nation	Player
—	DF	IRN	Vahid Nemati (to Aluminium Arak)
—	MF	IRN	Sajjad Erfani (to Shahrdari Ardabil)
—	GK	IRN	Rasoul Hosseini (to PAS Hamedan)
—	FW	IRN	Ehsan Taeidi (to Gol Gohar)
—	DF	IRN	Abdollah Hosseini (to Mes Kerman)
20	FW	IRN	Baba Mohammadi (from Foolad Yazd)
—	MF	IRN	Hamid Nemati (to Mes Rafsanjan)

=== Giti Pasand Isfahan ===
Head coach: (Armenia) Vahik Torosian

In: Note: Flags indicate national team as defined under FIFA eligibility rules; some limited exceptions apply. Players may hold more than one non-FIFA nationality.

No.	Pos.	Nation	Player
—	FW	IRN	Baba Mohammadi (from Foolad Yazd)
—	DF	IRN	Bahman Maleki (from Naft MIS)
—	MF	IRN	Masoud Giahchian (from Tarbiat Novin)
—	FW	IRN	Erfan Maftoolkar (on loan from Sepahan)

Out: Note: Flags indicate national team as defined under FIFA eligibility rules; some limited exceptions apply. Players may hold more than one non-FIFA nationality.

No.	Pos.	Nation	Player
—	MF	IRN	Hossein Doustdar (to Machine Shahrdari Tabriz)
—	MF	IRN	Sajjad Seyfi (to Machine Shahrdari Tabriz)
—	FW	IRN	Hamid Kazemi (to Nassaji)
—	MF	IRN	Mehran Ghasemi (to Rah Ahan)
—		IRN	Ahmad Mehrabi (Released)
—		IRN	Hamid Daniali (Released)
—		IRN	Ali Kazemi (Released)
—	FW	IRN	Mansour Tanhaei (to Khoneh Be Khoneh Mazandaran)

=== Gol Gohar Sirjan ===
Head coach: Ghasem Shahba

In: Note: Flags indicate national team as defined under FIFA eligibility rules; some limited exceptions apply. Players may hold more than one non-FIFA nationality.

No.	Pos.	Nation	Player
—	FW	IRN	Ehsan Taeidi (from Foolad Yazd)
—	MF	IRN	Esmaeil Kiani (from Niroo Zamini)
—	DF	IRN	Mahmoud Shaban (from Siah Jamegan Khorasan)
—	MF	IRN	Majid Jalalifar (from Siah Jamegan Khorasan)
—	GK	IRN	Amir Meghdad Maleki (from PAS Hamedan)
—	MF	IRN	Amjad Shokouh Magham (from Free agent)

Out: Note: Flags indicate national team as defined under FIFA eligibility rules; some limited exceptions apply. Players may hold more than one non-FIFA nationality.

No.	Pos.	Nation	Player
—	DF	IRN	Milad Sadeghian (to PAS Hamedan)
—	FW	IRN	Mokhtar Jomehzadeh (to PAS Hamedan)

=== Iranjavan ===
Head coach: Hamid Kolalifard

In: Note: Flags indicate national team as defined under FIFA eligibility rules; some limited exceptions apply. Players may hold more than one non-FIFA nationality.

No.	Pos.	Nation	Player

Out: Note: Flags indicate national team as defined under FIFA eligibility rules; some limited exceptions apply. Players may hold more than one non-FIFA nationality.

No.	Pos.	Nation	Player
6	MF	IRN	Mohsen Fayazbakhsh (to Fajr Sepasi – conscription)
26	DF	IRN	Danial Mahini (to Esteghlal Khuzestan)
—	MF	IRN	Ali Bigdeli (to Esteghlal Ahvaz)
—	MF	IRN	Kazem Hayatmanesh (to Mes Rafsanjan)
—	MF	IRN	Hossein Pour Amini (to Khoneh Be Khoneh Mazandaran)
—	FW	IRN	Mohammad Pahlevanpour (to Khoneh Be Khoneh Mazandaran)
—	DF	IRN	Hossein Moji (to Mes Rafsanjan)

=== Kheybar Khorramabad ===
Head coach: Ali Nikbakht

In: Note: Flags indicate national team as defined under FIFA eligibility rules; some limited exceptions apply. Players may hold more than one non-FIFA nationality.

No.	Pos.	Nation	Player
—	DF	IRN	Mohammad Vizvari (from Aluminium Arak)
—	FW	IRN	Mahmoud Ghaed Rahmat (from Ostandari Kermanshah)

Out: Note: Flags indicate national team as defined under FIFA eligibility rules; some limited exceptions apply. Players may hold more than one non-FIFA nationality.

No.	Pos.	Nation	Player

=== Khoneh Be Khoneh Mazandaran ===
Head coach: Akbar Misaghian

In: Note: Flags indicate national team as defined under FIFA eligibility rules; some limited exceptions apply. Players may hold more than one non-FIFA nationality.

No.	Pos.	Nation	Player
—	GK	IRN	Sirous Sangchouli (from Mes Kerman)
—	DF	IRN	Behtash Misaghian (from Mes Kerman)
—	FW	IRN	Rouhollah Bagheri (from Mes Kerman)
—	MF	IRN	Ali Haghdoost (from Mes Kerman)
—	DF	IRN	Omid Khalili (from Mes Kerman)
—	MF	IRN	Milad Jahani (from Gostaresh Foulad)
—	MF	IRN	Hossein Pour Amini (from Iranjavan)
—	FW	IRN	Mohammad Pahlevanpour (from Iranjavan)
—	MF	IRN	Mohammad Sattari (from Rah Ahan)
—	MF	IRN	Mohammad Hosseinpour (from Rah Ahan)
—	DF	IRN	Mohsen Bayat (from Esteghlal Khuzestan)
—	FW	IRN	Ali Choupani (on loan from Sepahan)
—	DF	IRN	Vahid Asgari (from Free agent)
—	DF	IRN	Amin Abbasi (from Siahjamegan)
—	MF	IRN	Hamid Marvi (from Siahjamegan)
—	FW	IRN	Hadi Kheyri (from Siahjamegan)
—	MF	IRN	Hossein Kiani (from Padideh)
—	DF	IRN	Ebrahim Abarghouei (from Naft Gachsaran)
—	FW	IRN	Mansour Tanhaei (from Giti Pasand Isfahan)
—	DF	IRN	Mehdi Karbalaei (from Esteghlal)
—	DF	IRN	Mohammad Khalili (from Esteghlal)
—	DF	IRN	Ahmad Mousavi (from Rah Ahan)
—	FW	IRN	Alireza Azimi (from Rah Ahan)
—	MF	IRN	Mohammad Soleiman Alizadeh (from Mes Kerman)
8	DF	IRN	Ali Nazifkar (from Mes Kerman)

Out: Note: Flags indicate national team as defined under FIFA eligibility rules; some limited exceptions apply. Players may hold more than one non-FIFA nationality.

No.	Pos.	Nation	Player
—	FW	IRN	Milad Kermani (to Mes Kerman)
77	DF	IRN	Alireza Mohammad (to Rah Ahan)
39	DF	IRN	Kazem Borjlou (to Rah Ahan)
2	DF	IRN	Ahmad Saeidi (Released)
4	DF	IRN	Javad Shafiei (Released)
5	DF	IRN	Ahad Shafiei (Released)
9	MF	IRN	Mohsen Pourhaji (Released)
11	FW	IRN	Mohammad Najafi (Released)
17	FW	IRN	Keyvan Hashemi (Released)
21	MF	IRN	Behrouz Zabihi (Released)
40	FW	IRN	Ali Rezvangaran (Released)
44	MF	IRN	Hossein Babaei (to Mes Rafsanjan)
99	MF	IRN	Alireza Nikbakht (Released)
—	DF	IRN	Mostafa Sabri (Released)
—	MF	IRN	Majid Noormohammadi (Released)
—	MF	IRN	Mohsen Rahimi (Released)
—	FW	IRN	Mojtaba Babak (Released)

=== Machine Shahrdari Tabriz ===
Head coach: Nader Dastneshan

In: Note: Flags indicate national team as defined under FIFA eligibility rules; some limited exceptions apply. Players may hold more than one non-FIFA nationality.

No.	Pos.	Nation	Player
—	DF	IRN	Alireza Jarahkar (from Mes Rafsanjan)
—	FW	IRN	Akbar Afaghi
—	MF	IRN	Hossein Doustdar (from Giti Pasand Isfahan)
—	GK	IRN	Peyman Shamlou (from Mes Rafsanjan)
—	MF	IRN	Jafar Barzegar (from Machine Sazi)
—	DF	IRN	Kamal Nikkhou (from Pars Jam)
—	FW	IRN	Siamak Dargahi (from Niroo Zamini)
—	FW	IRN	Farzad Mohammadi (from Naft Masjed Soleyman)
—	DF	IRN	Vahid Faregh (from Siah Jamegan Khorasan)
—	MF	IRN	Sajjad Seyfi (from Giti Pasand Isfahan)
—	FW	IRN	Behnam Beiranvand (from Tarbiat Yazd)
—	MF	IRN	Afshin Daneshian (from Naft Gachsaran)
—	DF	IRN	Mehdi Mohammadpouri (from Shahrdari Ardabil)
—	MF	IRN	Yazdan Abbasian (from Esteghlal Khuzestan)
—	MF	IRN	Saeid Eghabli
—	MF	IRN	Farzad Taheri (from Shohadaye Sari)
—	MF	IRN	Ali Mortezaei (from Gostaresh Foulad)
—	MF	IRN	Farshad Pourkhanmohammad (from Gostaresh Foulad)

Out: Note: Flags indicate national team as defined under FIFA eligibility rules; some limited exceptions apply. Players may hold more than one non-FIFA nationality.

No.	Pos.	Nation	Player
—	FW	IRN	Peyman Ranjbari (to Shahrdari Ardabil)
—	DF	IRN	Mehran Mousavi (to Shahrdari Ardabil)
—	FW	IRN	Sajjad Rahbar (to Siah Jamegan Khorasan)
—	DF	IRN	Mostafa Ahmadi (to Siah Jamegan Khorasan)
—	MF	IRN	Morteza Mahfouzi (to Aluminium Arak)
—	DF	IRN	Mohammad Ansari (to Persepolis)
—	GK	IRN	Vahid Azizi (to Mes Rafsanjan)
—	MF	IRN	Gholam Abbas Ashoubi (to Esteghlal Ahvaz)

=== Mes Kerman ===
Head coach: (Croatia) Vingo Begovic

In: Note: Flags indicate national team as defined under FIFA eligibility rules; some limited exceptions apply. Players may hold more than one non-FIFA nationality.

No.	Pos.	Nation	Player
—	GK	IRN	Kourosh Maleki (from Niroo Zamini)
—	MF	IRN	Milad Rouzbahani (from Niroo Zamini)
—	DF	IRN	Abbas Kazemian (from Mes Rafsanjan)
—	MF	IRN	Ali Marzban (from Mes Rafsanjan)
—	FW	IRN	Hossein Ghaharpour (from Parseh)
—	FW	IRN	Milad Kermani (from Khoneh Be Khoneh Mazandaran)
—	DF	IRN	Abdollah Hosseini (from Foolad Yazd)
—	GK	IRN	Ershad Yousefi (from Foolad)
—	MF	IRN	Edris Kouchaki (from Foolad Novin)
—	MF	IRN	Milad Poursafshekan (from Parseh)
—	FW	IRN	Saeed Sadeghi (from Saba Qom)
—	DF	IRN	Hadi Rekabi (from Saipa)
—	MF	IRN	Afshin Esmaeilzadeh (from Persepolis)
—	MF	IRN	Mohammadreza Zeynal Kheyri (from Shahrdari Ardabil)
—	FW	IRN	Keivan Amraei (from Naft MIS)

Out: Note: Flags indicate national team as defined under FIFA eligibility rules; some limited exceptions apply. Players may hold more than one non-FIFA nationality.

No.	Pos.	Nation	Player
7	DF	IRN	Mohammad Vahid Esmaeilbeigi (to Saipa)
3	DF	IRN	Mojtaba Tarshiz (to Gostareash Foulad)
10	FW	IRN	Karim Eslami (to Saba Qom)
40	GK	IRN	Sirous Sangchouli (to Khoneh Be Khoneh Mazandaran)
55	DF	IRN	Hassan Javadi (Released)
—	MF	IRN	Masoud Rouzbahani (Released)
—	MF	IRN	Mostafa Norouzi (Released)
22	GK	IRN	Hojjat Sedghi (to Paykan)
—	DF	IRN	Behtash Misaghian (to Khoneh Be Khoneh Mazandaran)
27	FW	IRN	Rouhollah Bagheri (to Khoneh Be Khoneh Mazandaran)
44	MF	IRN	Ali Haghdoost (to Khoneh Be Khoneh Mazandaran)
—	DF	IRN	Omid Khalili (to Khoneh Be Khoneh Mazandaran)
—	DF	IRN	Farhad Salaripour (to Fajr Sepasi – conscription)

=== Mes Rafsanjan ===
Head coach: (Croatia) Mišo Krstičević

In: Note: Flags indicate national team as defined under FIFA eligibility rules; some limited exceptions apply. Players may hold more than one non-FIFA nationality.

No.	Pos.	Nation	Player
—	GK	IRN	Vahid Azizi (from Machine Shahrdari Tabriz)
—	FW	IRN	Mojtaba Mahboub Mojaz (from PAS Hamedan)
—	MF	IRN	Kazem Hayatmanesh (from Iranjavan)
—	MF	IRN	Amir Khodamoradi (from Naft Gachsaran)
—	MF	IRN	Nasrollah Derafshi (from Naft Omidiyeh)
—	MF	IRN	Hamid Nemati (from Foolad Yazd)
—	DF	IRN	Emad Ghasemi (from Esteghlal Ahvaz)
—	DF	IRN	Vahid Erami (from Rahian Kermanshah)
—	FW	IRN	Ehsan Pirhadi (from Machine Shahrdari Tabriz)
44	MF	IRN	Hossein Babaei (from Khoneh Be Khoneh Mazandaran)
—	DF	IRN	Hossein Moji (from Iranjavan)

Out: Note: Flags indicate national team as defined under FIFA eligibility rules; some limited exceptions apply. Players may hold more than one non-FIFA nationality.

No.	Pos.	Nation	Player
—	DF	IRN	Alireza Jarahkar (to Machine Shahrdari Tabriz)
—	MF	IRN	Farshad Salarvand (to Esteghlal Khuzestan)
—	MF	IRN	Hamidreza Soleimani (to Aluminium Arak)
—	GK	IRN	Peyman Shamlou (to Machine Shahrdari Tabriz)
—	DF	IRN	Mehdi Rostami (Released)
—	DF	IRN	Peyman Shirzadi (to Esteghlal Khuzestan)
—	DF	IRN	Abbas Kazemian (to Mes Kerman)
—	MF	IRN	Ali Marzban (to Mes Kerman)
—	FW	IRN	Amin Motevaselzadeh (to Sanat Naft)

=== Naft Masjed Soleyman ===
Head coach: Farzad Hafezi

In: Note: Flags indicate national team as defined under FIFA eligibility rules; some limited exceptions apply. Players may hold more than one non-FIFA nationality.

No.	Pos.	Nation	Player
—	MF	IRN	Farshid Alizadeh (from Naft Gachsaran)
—	DF	IRN	Mohammad Khan Ahmadi (from Naft Gachsaran)
—	FW	IRN	Mojtaba Zarei (from PAS Hamedan)
—	DF	IRN	Ali Goudarzi (from Esteghlal Ahvaz)
—	MF	IRN	Reza Magholi (from Machine Shahrdari Tabriz)
—	DF	IRN	Atabak Namazi (from Machine Shahrdari Tabriz)
—	DF	IRN	Kheyrollah Veisi (from Esteghlal Ahvaz)
—	MF	IRN	Moein Rashedi (from Maft Omidiyeh)
—	MF	IRN	Milad Davoudi (from Rahian Kermanshah)
—	FW	IRN	Pejman Shahpari (from Shahrdari Bandar Abbas)

Out: Note: Flags indicate national team as defined under FIFA eligibility rules; some limited exceptions apply. Players may hold more than one non-FIFA nationality.

No.	Pos.	Nation	Player
8	MF	IRN	Hamid Bou Hamdan (loan return to Naft Tehran)
21	FW	IRN	Hossein Maleki (to Foolad)
22	GK	BUL	Georgi Georgiev (loan return to (Moldova) Sheriff Tiraspol)
17	FW	IRN	Farzad Mohammadi (to Machine Sazi Tabriz)
3	DF	IRN	Saeed Salarzadeh (to Esteghlal Ahvaz)
55	GK	IRN	Goudarz Davoudi (to Esteghlal Khuzestan)
11	MF	IRN	Milad Jafari (to Esteghlal Ahvaz)
9	MF	IRN	Mahmoud Tighnavard (to Sanat Naft)
10	FW	IRN	Reza Darvishi (to Malavan)
2	DF	IRN	Jalal Abdi (to Esteghlal Khuzestan)
12	DF	IRN	Bahman Maleki (to Giti Pasand Isfahan)
26	MF	UZB	Ruslan Melziddinov (Released)
28	FW	BRA	Maranhão (to (Japan) Ventforet Kofu)
29	MF	MDA	Alexandru Pașcenco (Released)
77	FW	IRN	Keivan Amraei (to Mes Kerman)

=== Nassaji ===
Head coach: (Portugal) Paulo Alves

In: Note: Flags indicate national team as defined under FIFA eligibility rules; some limited exceptions apply. Players may hold more than one non-FIFA nationality.

No.	Pos.	Nation	Player
—	MF	IRN	Meysam Khodashenas (from Fajr Sepasi – return from conscription)
—	FW	IRN	Amin Shojaeian (from Fajr Sepasi)
—	FW	IRN	Ebrahim Kuhafkan (from Shahrdari Ardabil)
—	DF	IRN	Milad Ahmadi (from Shahrdari Ardabil)
—	FW	IRN	Amir Hossein Tahuni (from Esteghlal, previously on loan)
—	DF	IRN	Bahram Dabbagh (from Naft Tehran)
—	DF	IRN	Nima Delavari (from Shahrdari Bandar Abbas)
—	FW	IRN	Hamid Kazemi (from Giti Pasand Isfahan)
—	FW	IRN	Mohammad Reza Nejat (from Fajr Sepasi)
—	DF	IRN	Hamid Jokar (from Fajr Sepasi)
—	DF	IRN	Alireza Jalili (from Fajr Sepasi)
—	MF	IRN	Meysam Baou (from Esteghlal Khuzestan)

Out: Note: Flags indicate national team as defined under FIFA eligibility rules; some limited exceptions apply. Players may hold more than one non-FIFA nationality.

No.	Pos.	Nation	Player
11	FW	IRN	Bahman Tahmasebi (Retired)
—	MF	IRN	Shahin Majidi (to Esteghlal Ahvaz)
—	DF	IRN	Mostafa Hashemi (to Khoneh Be Khoneh)
—	FW	IRN	Nima Mokhtari (to Gostaresh Foulad)
25	DF	IRN	Abolfazl Ghorbani (to Aluminium Arak)
—		IRN	Mohammad Hossein Babagoli (to Rah Ahan)

=== Parseh Tehran ===
Head coach: Farshad Pious

In: Note: Flags indicate national team as defined under FIFA eligibility rules; some limited exceptions apply. Players may hold more than one non-FIFA nationality.

No.	Pos.	Nation	Player
—	DF	IRN	Hassan Javadi (from Mes Kerman)

Out: Note: Flags indicate national team as defined under FIFA eligibility rules; some limited exceptions apply. Players may hold more than one non-FIFA nationality.

No.	Pos.	Nation	Player
9	FW	IRN	Peyman Miri (to Siah Jamegan Khorasan)
—	GK	IRN	Mohammad Bagher Shabani (Released)
15	DF	IRN	Mojtaba Mamashli (to Sanat Naft)
—	FW	IRN	Mohammad Shadkam (to Sanat Naft)
4	DF	IRN	Mohsen Varzkar (to PAS Hamedan)
18	FW	IRN	Hossein Ghaharpour (to Mes Kerman)
—	MF	IRN	Mohammad-Esmail Nazari (to Esteghlal Ahvaz)
—	MF	IRN	Milad Poursafshekan (to Mes Kerman)

=== PAS Hamedan ===
Head coach: Davoud Mahabadi

In: Note: Flags indicate national team as defined under FIFA eligibility rules; some limited exceptions apply. Players may hold more than one non-FIFA nationality.

No.	Pos.	Nation	Player
—	DF	IRN	Rasoul Pirzadeh (from Gostaresh Foulad)
—	DF	IRN	Milad Sadeghian (from Gol Gohar)
—	FW	IRN	Mokhtar Jomehzadeh (from Gol Gohar)
—	GK	IRN	Rasoul Hosseini (from Foolad Yazd)
—	MF	IRN	Amin Pour Ali (from Rahian Kermanshah)
—	DF	IRN	Armin Talaeimanesh (from Rahian Kermanshah)
—	GK	IRN	Masoud Pourmohammad (from Rahian Kermanshah)
—	FW	IRN	Nima Partouei (from Shahrdari Zanjan)
—	DF	IRN	Mohsen Varzkar (from Parseh)
—	FW	IRN	Arman Ramezani (from Fajr Sepasi)
—	FW	IRN	Jahangir Asgari (from Sanat Naft)
—	DF	IRN	Rouhollah Soltani (from Machine Shahrdari Tabriz)

Out: Note: Flags indicate national team as defined under FIFA eligibility rules; some limited exceptions apply. Players may hold more than one non-FIFA nationality.

No.	Pos.	Nation	Player
—	FW	IRN	Mojtaba Mahboub Mojaz (to Mes Rafsanjan)
—	GK	IRN	Jalil Ahmadi (Released)
—	FW	IRN	Mojtaba Zare (Released)
—	DF	IRN	Mohammad Borjlou (Released)
—	FW	IRN	Samad Akbari (Released)
—	DF	IRN	Soroush Nasseri (Released)
—	GK	IRN	Amir Meghdad Maleki (to Gol Gohar)
—	MF	IRN	Vahid Mohammadi (Released)
—	FW	IRN	Mostafa Solgi (Released)
—	GK	IRN	Mehrdad Bashagardi (to Foolad)
—	DF	IRN	Mohsen Hamidi (to Esteghlal Ahvaz)

=== Paykan ===
Head coach: Alireza Marzban

In: Note: Flags indicate national team as defined under FIFA eligibility rules; some limited exceptions apply. Players may hold more than one non-FIFA nationality.

No.	Pos.	Nation	Player
10	FW	IRN	Mehdi Nazari (from Padideh)
31	GK	IRN	Hojjat Sedghi (from Mes Kerman)
25	MF	IRN	Milad Soleiman Fallah (from Esteghlal)
2	DF	IRN	Navid Khosh Hava (from Rah Ahan)
77	MF	IRN	Abbas Mohammadrezaei (from Rah Ahan)
—	MF	IRN	Khalil Helali (from Rah Ahan)
4	DF	IRN	Mehdi Rostami (from Mes Rafsanjan)
19	MF	IRN	Javad Zeyghami (from Sanat Naft)
32	FW	IRN	Hamid Nouri (from Fajr Sepasi)
13	FW	IRN	Mojtaba Shiri (from Rah Ahan)
18	DF	IRN	Rasoul Soroushnia (from Mes Rafsanjan)
90	DF	IRN	Ali Dashti (from Iranjavan)
88	MF	IRN	Mohammad Hassan Rajabzadeh (from Padideh)
—	GK	IRN	Ahmad Arabpour (from Tarbiat Novin)

Out: Note: Flags indicate national team as defined under FIFA eligibility rules; some limited exceptions apply. Players may hold more than one non-FIFA nationality.

No.	Pos.	Nation	Player
1	GK	IRN	Mehdi Rahmati (to Esteghlal)
20	DF	IRN	Mohammad Nosrati (to Gostaresh Foulad)
19	DF	IRN	Vahid Heydarieh (to Persepolis)
10	FW	IRN	Saeid Daghighi (to Gostaresh Foulad)
77	MF	IRN	Hossein Karimi (to Rah Ahan)
23	MF	IRN	Amirhossein Feshangchi (to Foolad)
4	FW	IRN	Siavash Akbarpour (Retired)
24	DF	IRN	Ali Hosseini (to Esteghlal Ahvaz)
22	MF	IRN	Ahmad Mehdizadeh (to Rah Ahan)
2	DF	IRN	Hamidreza Divsalar (to Rah Ahan)
3	MF	TRI	Jlloyd Samuel (Released)
15	MF	BRA	Dodó (to (Turkey) Giresunspor)
88	MF	BIH	Muamer Svraka (to (Croatia) Istra 1961)
6	MF	IRN	Ahmad Jamshidian (Released)
17	FW	IRN	Mostafa Shojaei (to Mes Kerman)
37	DF	IRN	Erfan Ravasha (to Esteghlal B)

=== Sanat Naft ===
Head coach: (Portugal) Carlos Manuel

In: Note: Flags indicate national team as defined under FIFA eligibility rules; some limited exceptions apply. Players may hold more than one non-FIFA nationality.

No.	Pos.	Nation	Player
—	DF	IRN	Mojtaba Mamashli (from Parseh)
—	FW	IRN	Mohammad Shadkam (from Parseh)
—	FW	IRN	Amin Motevaselzadeh (from Mes Rafsanjan)
—	MF	IRN	Mahmoud Tighnavard (from Naft MIS)
—	FW	IRN	Jafar Bazri (from Aluminum Hormozgan)

Out: Note: Flags indicate national team as defined under FIFA eligibility rules; some limited exceptions apply. Players may hold more than one non-FIFA nationality.

No.	Pos.	Nation	Player
10	FW	IRN	Rahim Mehdi Zohaivi (to Esteghlal Khuzestan)
6	MF	IRN	Sadegh Gashni (to Aluminium Arak)
9	FW	IRN	Meghdad Ghobakhlou (to Gostaresh Foulad)
5	DF	IRN	Saeid Ali Shirazi (Released)
7	FW	IRN	Taleb Reykani (to Esteghlal Ahvaz)
77	FW	IRN	Jahangir Asgari (to PAS Hamedan)
88	MF	IRN	Majid Khodabandelou (to Shahrdari Ardabil)

=== Shahrdari Ardabil ===
Head coach: Mohammad Rabiei

In: Note: Flags indicate national team as defined under FIFA eligibility rules; some limited exceptions apply. Players may hold more than one non-FIFA nationality.

No.	Pos.	Nation	Player
—	FW	IRN	Peyman Ranjbari (from Machine Shahrdari Tabriz)
—	DF	IRN	Mehran Mousavi (from Machine Shahrdari Tabriz)
—	MF	IRN	Davoud Shahvaraghi (from Foolad Novin)
—	DF	IRN	Navid Sabouri (from Persepolis)
—	DF	IRN	Masih Zahedi (from Saipa)
—	MF	IRN	Alireza Alizadeh (from Saipa)
—	MF	IRN	Sajjad Erfani (from Foolad Yazd)
—	DF	IRN	Mohammad Siah (from Aluminium Hormozgan)
—	MF	IRN	Ali Astani (from Persepolis)
—	MF	IRN	Majid Khodabandelou (from Sanat Naft)

Out: Note: Flags indicate national team as defined under FIFA eligibility rules; some limited exceptions apply. Players may hold more than one non-FIFA nationality.

No.	Pos.	Nation	Player
—	FW	IRN	Ebrahim Kuhafkan (to Nassaji)
—	DF	IRN	Milad Ahmadi (to Nassaji)
—	DF	IRN	Mehdi Mohammadpouri (to Machine Shahrdari Tabriz)
—	MF	IRN	Mohammadreza Zeynal Kheyri (to Mes Kerman)

== See also ==
- List of Iranian football transfers winter 2013–14
- List of Iranian football transfers summer 2014
- List of Iranian football transfers winter 2014–15
