= Khaziravi =

Khaziravi is a surname (Persian: خذیراوی). Notable people with the surname include:

- Ahmad Khaziravi (born 1989), Iranian footballer
- Hamzeh Khaziravi (born 1994), Iranian footballer
- Mojahed Khaziravi (born 1980), Iranian footballer
