= Mahini =

Mahini (Persian: مهینی) is an Iranian surname. Notable people with the surname include:

- Danial Mahini (born 1993), Iranian footballer
- Hossein Mahini (born 1986), Iranian footballer
