= Milad Pakparvar =

Iranian Football winger (born 1994)

Personal information
- Date of birth: 3 October 1994 (age 32)
- Place of birth: Ahvaz, Iran
- Height: 1.76 m (5 ft 9 in)
- Position: Winger

Team information
- Current team: Paykan
- Number: 99

Youth career
- –2013: Esteghlal Ahvaz
- 2013–2015: Foolad

Senior career*
Years	Team	Apps	(Gls)
2012–2013	Esteghlal Ahvaz	2	(0)
2015–2016	Esteghlal Ahvaz	24	(1)
2016–2018	Foolad	9	(0)
2018	Naft Al-Wasat	0	(0)
2018–2019	Sorkhpooshan Pakdasht	3	(0)
2019–2020	Khooneh be Khooneh	3	(0)
2020	Esteghlal Khuzestan	5	(0)
2020–2021	Esteghlal Mollasani	21	(4)
2021–2022	Shams Azar	19	(2)
2022	Churchill Brothers	2	(0)
2023–2024	Esteghlal Mollasani	17	(1)
2024–	Paykan	5	(0)
- * Club domestic league appearances and goals as of 21 April 2025

Milad Pakparvar (Persian: میلاد پاک‌پرور; born 3 October 1994) is an Iranian professional footballer who plays as a winger for Paykan in Azadegan League.

== Club career ==
Pakparvar joined Esteghlal Ahvaz in summer 2015, after graduating from Foolad Academy. He made his professional debut for Esteghlal Ahvaz on 7 August 2015 against Siah Jamegan Khorasan where he used as a substitute for Mobin Mirdoraghi.

== Club statistics ==
=== Club ===
As of 20 November 2022

Club	Season	League			Cup		Other		AFC		Total	
Club	Season	Division	Apps	Goals	Apps	Goals	Apps	Goals	Apps	Goals	Apps	Goals
Esteghlal; Ahvaz	2012–13	League 1	2	0	0	0	—		—		2	0
Esteghlal; Ahvaz	2015–16	Persian Gulf Pro League	24	1	1 (Note: Appearance(s) in Iranian Hazfi Cup)	0	—		—		25	1
Esteghlal; Ahvaz	Esteghlal Ahvaz total		26	1	1	0	0	0	0	0	27	1
Foolad	2016–17	Persian Gulf Pro League	9	0	0	0	—		—		9	0
Sorkhpooshan; Pakdasht	2018–19	League 1	3	0	1	0	—		—		4	0
Khooneh be Khooneh	2018–19	League 1	3	0	0	0	—		—		3	0
Esteghlal; Khuzestan	2019–20	League 1	0	0	0	0	—		—		0	0
Esteghlal; Mollasani	2020–21	League 1	22	4	1	0	—		—		23	4
Shams Azar	2021–22	League 1	18	2	2	0	—		—		20	2
Churchill; Brothers	2022–23	I-League	2	0	0	0	3 (Note: Appearance(s) in Baji Rout Cup)	1	—		5	1
Career total			83	7	5	0	3	1	0	0	91	8

== Honours ==
Churchill Brothers

- Baji Rout Cup runner-up: 2022
