= Milad Taji =

Iranian footballer

Personal information
- Full name: Milad Taji
- Date of birth: November 30, 1993 (age 32)
- Place of birth: Shiraz, Iran
- Height: 1.80 m (5 ft 11 in)
- Position: Striker

Team information
- Current team: Rah Ahan
- Number: 26

Senior career*
Years	Team	Apps	(Gls)
2013–2015	Shahrdari Bandar Abbas	7	(0)
2015–	Rah Ahan	3	(0)
- * Club domestic league appearances and goals as of 31 October 2015

Milad Taji (Persian: میلاد تاجی) is an Iranian football forward who plays for Rah Ahan in the Iran Pro League.

== Club career ==
=== Rah Ahan ===
Taji joined Rah Ahan in summer 2015 with a contract until 2018 after leaving Bandar Abbas. He made his professional debut for Rah Ahan on 6 August 2015 in a 2–0 loss against Saipa as a substitute for Ahmad Mehdizadeh.

His career was characterized as short due to injuries.

== Club career statistics ==
As of 31 October 2015.

Club	Division	Season	League		Hazfi Cup		Asia		Total	
Club	Division	Season	Apps	Goals	Apps	Goals	Apps	Goals	Apps	Goals
Sh. Bandar Abbas	Division 1	2014–15	7	0	0	0	–	–	7	0
Rah Ahan	Pro League	2015–16	3	0	0	0	–	–	3	0
Career Totals			10	0	0	0	0	0	10	0
