= Fath Mashhad F.C. =

Iranian football club

Fath Mashhad فتح مشهد
- Full name: Fath Mashhad Football Club
- Founded: 11 February 1988; 37 years ago
- Ground: Takhti Mashhad Stadium
- Capacity: 15,000
- Owner: Free
- Head Coach: Hamid Vahidi
- League: League 2 (Iran)
- Website: http://fathfc.ir/
Home colours	Away colours

Fath Mashhad Football Club (Persian: باشگاه فوتبال فتح مشهد), commonly known as Fath Mashhad, or FTH, is an Iranian football club based in Mashhad, Khorasan, that competes in the League 2. The club was founded in 1988.

The football team plays their home games at the Takhti Stadium which has a seating capacity of 15,000.

== History ==
=== Establishment ===
In 1988, a group of youngsters, who were from Mashhad established a football team named Fath. They started playing in the 2nd division of Mashhad's local city league. The club was officially founded on 11 February 1988.

=== 1990s ===
In 1995 they became champions of Khorasan province, and in 1996 were promoted to the League 2.

=== Takeover ===
Fath Mashhad are now officially known as Fath Mashhad, although the name is not in common use yet.

== Mashhad Derby ==
Main articles: Mashhad Derby

The Mashhad Derby was played between Fath Mashhad and Aboumoslem, but due to relegation to the Azadegan League and then the 2nd Division, the derby has not been played in over 5 years.

== Players ==
As of July 23, 2003

=== First-team squad ===
Note: Flags indicate national team as defined under FIFA eligibility rules; some limited exceptions apply. Players may hold more than one non-FIFA nationality.

No.	Pos.	Nation	Player
1	GK	(Iran) IRN	Arman Mahmoud Hashemi
2	DF	(Iran) IRN	Amin Shafiei
3	DF	(Iran) IRN	Hadi Rabbani
4	DF	(Iran) IRN	Reza Zareh Pour
5	DF	(Iran) IRN	Afshin Kardani (3rd captain)
6	DF	(Iran) IRN	Behtash Misaghian
7	DF	(Iran) IRN	Vahid Asgari (captain)
8	DF	(Iran) IRN	Siavash Yazdani
9	MF	(Iran) IRN	Amir Toloue (vice captain)
10	MF	(Iran) IRN	Ali Bakhshian
10	DF	(Iran) IRN	Reza Nasehi
11	MF	(Iran) IRN	Amir Fouladi
11	MF	(Iran) IRN	Ramin Askari
12	MF	(Iran) IRN	Ehsan Mehran
13	MF	(Iran) IRN	Emad Hashemi
14	MF	(Iran) IRN	Hossein Hasanzadeh
15	MF	(Iran) IRN	Alireza Mojiri
16	FW	(Iran) IRN	Omid Rajabpour
17	FW	(Iran) IRN	Seyed Morteza Mahdavian
10	GK	(Iran) IRN	Naser Tashakori
10	FW	(Iran) IRN	Afshin Kouhestani

No.	Pos.	Nation	Player
18	GK	(Iran) IRN	Amir Abbas Norouzi
19	GK	(Iran) IRN	Yousef Bashian
20	GK	(Iran) IRN	Davoud Daliri
21	GK	(Iran) IRN	Hasan Bakhshian
22	FW	(Iran) IRN	Mohsen Gheytani
23	FW	(Iran) IRN	Ehsan Mahouri
23	FW	(Iran) IRN	Mostafa Asgari
10	MF	(Iran) IRN	Afshin Rahimzadeh
10	MF	(Iran) IRN	Alireza Rahimzadeh
10	FW	(Iran) IRN	Alireza Arik
10	MF	(Iran) IRN	Saber Haghighat
10	MF	(Iran) IRN	Emad Saberan
10	MF	(Iran) IRN	Mohammad hezbollahi
10	MF	(Iran) IRN	Javad Khanfadardi
10	DF	(Iran) IRN	Alireza Etminan
10	MF	(Iran) IRN	Meysam Naeini
10	MF	(Iran) IRN	Shahab Beheshti

== Head coaches ==
- (Iran) Hamid Vahidi (1988-)
