= Morteza Mahfouzi =

Iranian footballer

Personal information
- Full name: Seyed Morteza Mahfouzi
- Date of birth: November 26, 1986 (age 39)
- Place of birth: Tabriz, Iran
- Position: Defender

Team information
- Current team: Aluminium Arak

Senior career*
Years	Team	Apps	(Gls)
2010–2012	Niroo Zamini		
2012–2014	Gostaresh Foulad		
2014	Shahrdari Tabriz		
2014–2015	Gostaresh Foulad		
2015–	Aluminium Arak	27	(1)
- * Club domestic league appearances and goals as of 12 June 2016

Morteza Mahfouzi (Persian: مرتضی محفوظی, born 1986) is an Iranian football defender who plays for Aluminium Arak in the Azadegan League. 2013-2014 and 2014–15 seasons he played for the Gostaresh Foulad in Iran pro League.
