= Amir Tizrou =

Iranian footballer

Personal information
- Full name: Amir Tizrou
- Date of birth: 3 May 1983 (age 43)
- Place of birth: Sowme'eh Sara, Gilan, Iran
- Position: Defender

Team information
- Current team: Sepidrood Rasht S.C.
- Number: 4

Senior career*
Years	Team	Apps	(Gls)
2012–2014	Gostaresh Foolad	28	(0)
2014–2015	Damash Gilan	19	(1)
2015–2016	Siah Jamegan	7	(0)
2016–	Machine Sazi	0	(0)
- * Club domestic league appearances and goals as of 22 June 2015

Amir Tizrou is an Iranian footballer who plays for Sepidrood Rasht S.C. as a defender in the Azadegan League. Before playing for the Sepidrood Rasht S.C. as a defender, Tizrou played for the Damash Gilan club based in Rasht. On 31 October 2018 Tzirou scored his first goal for the team during his team debut. He played for several other clubs in the Asadegan League as well. As of 2026, Tizrou is listed as retired.
