= Goudarz Davoudi =

Footballer

Personal information
- Date of birth: 7 April 1993 (age 33)
- Place of birth: Ahvaz, Iran
- Height: 1.84 m (6 ft 0 in)
- Position: Goalkeeper

Team information
- Current team: Bandar Astara
- Number: 1

Youth career
- –2014: Naft Masjed Soleyman

Senior career*
Years	Team	Apps	(Gls)
2012–2015	Naft Masjed Soleyman	2	(0)
2015–2018	Esteghlal Khuzestan	4	(0)
2018–2020	Fajr Sepasi Shiraz	0	(0)
2020–2021	Khooshe Talaei Saveh	3	(0)
2021–2022	Qashqai	20	(0)
2022–2023	Chadormalou	9	(0)
2023	Shahin Bushehr	3	(0)
2024	Mes Kerman	0	(0)
2024–	Bandar Astara	9	(0)
- * Club domestic league appearances and goals as of 10 November 2024

Goudarz Davoudi (Persian: گودرز داوودی, born 7 April 1993) is an Iranian footballer who plays as a goalkeeper for Azadegan League club Bandar Astara.

== Club career ==
=== Naft masjed Soleyman ===
Davoudi started his career with Naft Masjed Soleyman. He was part of Naft Masjed Soleyman in promotion to Iran Pro League in 2014. He made his professional debut for Masjed Soleymani side on the last fixture of 2014–15 Iran Pro League against Malavan.

=== Club career statistics ===
As of 19 May 2015.

Club	Division	Season	League		Hazfi Cup		Asia		Total	
Club	Division	Season	Apps	Goals	Apps	Goals	Apps	Goals	Apps	Goals
Naft MIS	Division 1	2012–13	1	0	0	0	–	–	1	0
Naft MIS	Division 1	2013–14	0	0	1	0	–	–	1	0
Naft MIS	Pro League	2014–15	1	0	2	0	–	–	3	0
Career Total			2	0	3	0	0	0	5	0

== International career ==
=== U23 ===
He invited to Iran U-23 training camp by Mohammad Khakpour.

== Honours ==
Esteghlal Khuzestan

- Iran Pro League (1): 2015–16
- Iranian Super Cup runner-up: 2016
