= Farhad Salaripour =

Iranian footballer

Personal information
- Date of birth: 29 January 1987 (age 39)
- Place of birth: Kerman, Iran
- Height: 1.83 m (6 ft 0 in)
- Position: Left back

Youth career
- 2000–2004: Shahrdari Kerman
- 2004–2009: Mes Kerman

Senior career*
| Years | Team | Apps | (Gls) |
| 2009–2015 | Mes Kerman | 107 | (0) |
| 2015–2016 | Fajr Sepasi | 20 | (0) |
| 2016–2020 | Mes Kerman | 32 | (0) |
- * Club domestic league appearances and goals

Farhad Salaripour (Persian: فرهاد سالاری پور; born 29 January 1987) is an Iranian former professional football player.

== Career ==
Salaripour has played for Mes Kerman since 2009.

| Club performance | | | League | | Cup | | Continental | | Total | |
| Season | Club | League | Apps | Goals | Apps | Goals | Apps | Goals | Apps | Goals |
| Iran | | | League | | Hazfi Cup | | Asia | | Total | |
|---|---|---|---|---|---|---|---|---|---|---|
| 2009–10 | Mes Kerman | Pro League | 3 | 0 | 0 | 0 | 0 | 0 | 3 | 0 |
| 2010–11 | Mes Kerman | Pro League | 27 | 0 | 1 | 0 | – | – | 28 | 0 |
| 2011–12 | Mes Kerman | Pro League | 31 | 0 | 3 | 0 | – | – | 34 | 0 |
| 2012–13 | Mes Kerman | Pro League | 19 | 0 | 1 | 0 | – | – | 20 | 0 |
| 2013–14 | Mes Kerman | Pro League | 27 | 0 | 5 | 0 | – | – | 32 | 0 |
| Career total | | | 107 | 0 | 10 | 0 | 0 | 0 | 117 | 0 |

== External sources ==
- Profile at Persianleague
