= Hamidreza Divsalar =

Iranian Football Midfielder

Personal information
- Full name: Hamidreza Divsalar
- Date of birth: June 25, 1990 (age 36)
- Place of birth: Nour, Iran
- Positions: Left winger; left back

Team information
- Current team: Gol Reyhan

Youth career
- Ashoura Amol
- Bahman Amol
- Moghavemat Mazandaran
- –2008: Paykan
- 2008–2010: Rah Ahan

Senior career*
Years	Team	Apps	(Gls)
2008–2010	Rah Ahan	1	(0)
2010	Gostaresh	5	(0)
2010–2011	Malavan	0	(0)
2012–2015	Paykan	77	(2)
2015–2016	Rah Ahan	26	(0)
2016–2017	Saba Qom	25	(0)
2017–2018	Khooneh be Khooneh	28	(1)
2018–2019	Nassaji Mazandaran	0	(0)
2019–2020	Gol Reyhan		
2020–2021	Shahin Bushehr F.C.		
2021–2022	F.C. Kheybar Khorramabad		
2022	Saipa F.C.		

International career
2005–2006	Iran U-17		
2008–2009	Iran U-20		
2009–2010	Iran U-23		
- * Club domestic league appearances and goals as of 7 August 2014

Hamidreza Divsalar (Persian: حمیدرضا دیوسالار; born June 25, 1990) is an Iranian football midfielder.

== Career ==
He started his career with Rah Ahan in 2008 and made his debut for Rah Ahan against Mes Kerman. In the winter of 2012, he joined Paykan.

=== Club career statistics ===
Club performance			League		Cup		Continental		Total	
Season	Club	League	Apps	Goals	Apps	Goals	Apps	Goals	Apps	Goals
Iran			League		Hazfi Cup		Asia		Total	
2008–09	Rah Ahan	Pro League	1	0	0	0	–		1	0
2009–10	Rah Ahan	Pro League	0	0	0	0	–		0	0
2009–10	Gostaresh Fo.	Division 1	5	0	5	1	–		10	1
2010–11	Malavan	Pro League	0	0	0	0	–		1	0
2011–12	Malavan	Pro League	0	0	1	0	–		1	0
2011–12	Paykan	Division 1	7	1	0	0	–		7	1
2012–13	Paykan	Pro League	25	1	0	0	–		25	1
2013–14	Paykan	Division 1	22	0	0	0	–	–	22	0
2014–15	Paykan	Pro League	23	0	2	0	–	–	25	0
Career total			83	2	9	1	0	0	92	3
