= Amin Shojaeian =

Iranian footballer

Personal information
- Date of birth: 27 June 1988 (age 38)
- Place of birth: Shiraz, Iran
- Height: 1.78 m (5 ft 10 in)
- Position: Forward

Youth career
- Fajr Sepasi

Senior career*
Years	Team	Apps	(Gls)
2009–2013	Fajr Sepasi	27	(8)
2013–2014	Shahrdari Hamedan	6	(0)
2014–2015	Fajr Sepasi	18	(4)
2015–2017	Nassaji	46	(2)
2017–2018	Fajr Sepasi	27	(5)
2018–2019	Gol Reyhan	14	(0)
2019–2020	Elmoadab	9	(1)
2020–2021	Shahin Bushehr	23	(1)
2021–2022	Iman Sabz		
- * Club domestic league appearances and goals

Amin Shojaeian (Persian: امین شجاعیان; born 27 June 1988) is an Iranian former football forward. He is an elder brother of Dariush Shojaeian.

== Career ==
Shojaeian started his career with Fajr Sepasi in 2009.

=== Club career statistics ===
As of 11 May 2012

Club performance			League		Cup		Continental		Total	
Season	Club	League	Apps	Goals	Apps	Goals	Apps	Goals	Apps	Goals
Iran			League		Hazfi Cup		Asia		Total	
2009–10	Fajr Sepasi	Pro League	1	0			–			
2010–11	Fajr Sepasi	Division 1	25	4			–			
2011–12	Fajr Sepasi	Pro League	9	0			–			
2012–13	Fajr Sepasi	Pro League	0	0	0	0	–		0	0
Career total			35	4			0	0		
