= Sadegh Gashni =

Iranian football midfielder (born 1986)

Personal information
- Full name: Sadegh Gashni
- Date of birth: August 28, 1986 (age 40)
- Place of birth: Borazjan, Iran
- Position: Midfielder

Youth career
- 2000–2005: Etehad Borazjan

Senior career*
Years	Team	Apps	(Gls)
2005–2011	Persepolis Borazjan		
2011–2012	Iranjavan	23	(3)
2012	Paykan	12	(0)
2012–2014	Iranjavan	32	(1)
2014–2015	Sanat Naft Abadan	13	(0)
2015–	Aluminium Arak	4	(0)
- * Club domestic league appearances and goals as of 31 July 2012

Sadegh Gashni (Persian: صادق گشنی; born August 28, 1986) is an Iranian football midfielder, who plays for Aluminium Arak in the Azadegan League.

== Career ==
Gashni joined Paykan in Summer 2012 after a season playing in Iranjavan.

== Club career statistics ==
As of 31 July 2012

Club performance			League		Cup		Continental		Total	
Season	Club	League	Apps	Goals	Apps	Goals	Apps	Goals	Apps	Goals
Iran			League		Hazfi Cup		Asia		Total	
2011–12	Iranjavan	Division 1	23	3			–			
2012–13	Paykan	Pro League	3	0	0	0	–		3	0
Career total			26	3			0	0		
