= Mohammad Shadkam =

Iranian footballer

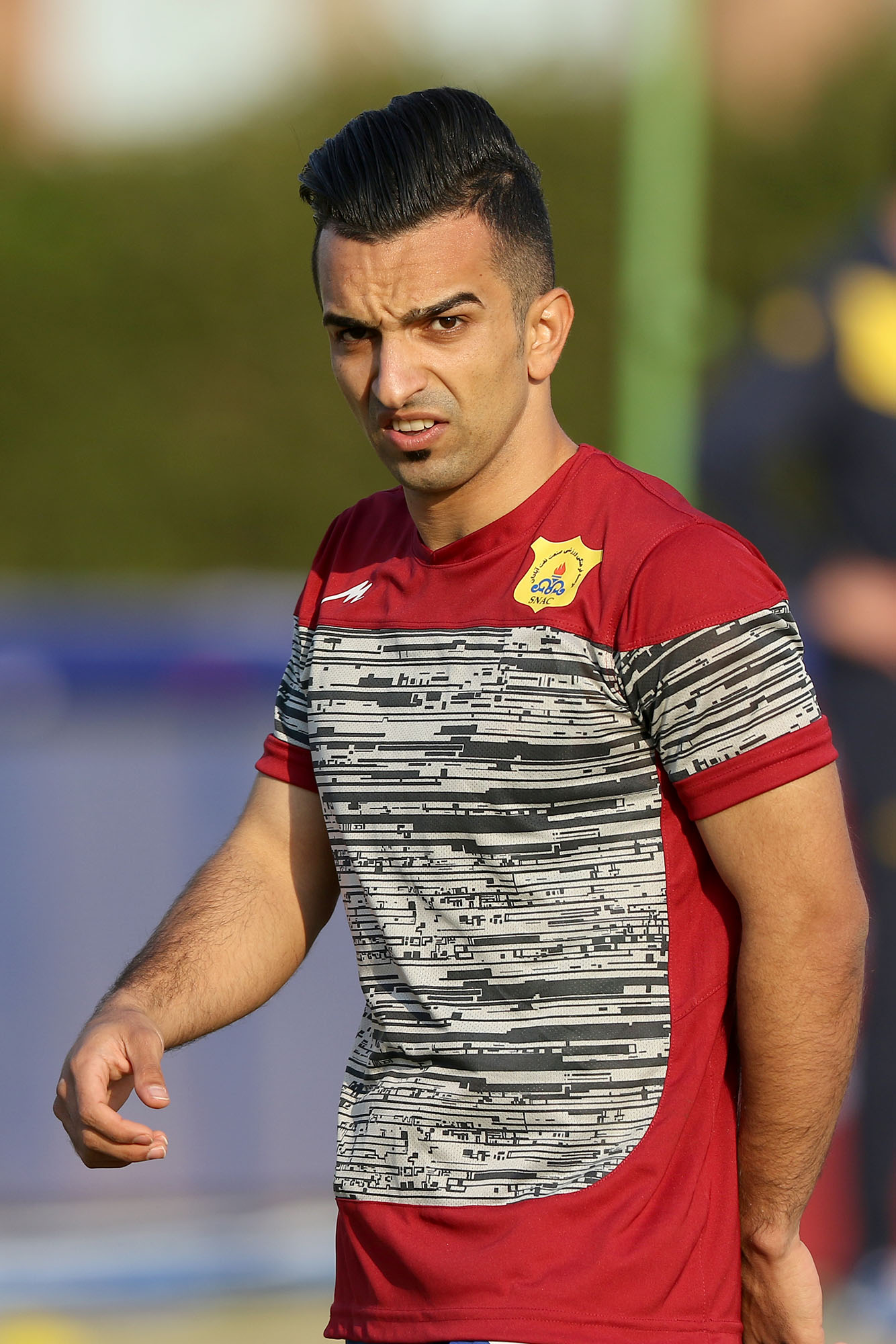

Personal information
- Date of birth: 28 April 1990 (age 36)
- Place of birth: Tehran, Iran
- Height: 1.70 m (5 ft 7 in)
- Position: Striker

Team information
- Current team: Padyab Khalkhal
- Number: 17

Youth career
- 2009–2014: Foolad

Senior career*
Years	Team	Apps	(Gls)
2012–2014	Gol Gohar	46	(9)
2014–2015	Parseh Tehran	14	(4)
2015–2018	Sanat Naft	76	(14)
2018	Pars Jonoubi	10	(1)
2019	Naft Masjed Soleyman	13	(0)
2019–2020	Gol Reyhan	1	(0)
2020	Sepidrood	13	(1)
2020–2021	Rayka Babol	11	(2)
2021–2022	Foolad B	1	(0)
2022–2023	Shahrdari Hamedan	3	(0)
2023	Foolad Hormozgan	4	(1)
2023–2024	Petro Palayesh	5	(1)
2024–	Padyab Khalkhal	5	(1)
- * Club domestic league appearances and goals as of 5 April 2025

Mohammad Shadkam (Persian: محمد شادکام; born 28 April 1990) is an Iranian football striker who plays for Padyab Khalkhal in the League 2.

== Club career statistics ==
As of 7 April 2015.

Club	Division	Season	League		Hazfi Cup		Asia		Total	
Club	Division	Season	Apps	Goals	Apps	Goals	Apps	Goals	Apps	Goals
Sanat Naft	Division 1	2014–15	3	1	0	0	1	1	4	2
Career Totals			3	1	0	0	1	1	4	2
