= Hossein Kheyri =

Iranian footballer

Personal information
- Full name: Hossein Kheyri Gharanghieh
- Date of birth: 4 July 1994 (age 32)
- Place of birth: Tehran, Iran
- Position: Midfielder

Team information
- Current team: Rah Ahan
- Number: 28

Youth career
- 2012–2015: Saipa

Senior career*
Years	Team	Apps	(Gls)
2015–2016	Rah Ahan	4	(0)
2016-2017	Oxin Alborz		
2017/2018	Niroye Zamini		
2020/2021	Golreyhan FC		
2020/2021	Vista Turbine		
2021/2022	Qashqai Shiraz		
2022/2023	Damash Gilan		
2024/2025	Sepidrood		
2024/2025	Shenavar Sazi		
2025/2026	Foolad H		
- * Club domestic league appearances and goals as of 31 October 2015

Hossein Kheyri (Persian: حسین خیری) (born 4 July 1994) is an Iranian football midfielder who played for Rah Ahan in the Iran Pro League.

== Club career ==
=== Rah Ahan ===
Kheyri joined Rah Ahan in summer 2015 with a contract until 2018. He made his professional debut for Rah Ahan on 16 October 2015 in 5–0 win against Esteghlal Ahvaz as a starter. Kheyri would leave Rah Ahan on 8 January 2016 and join Oxin Alborz.

== Club career statistics ==
As of 31 October 2015

Club	Division	Season	League		Hazfi Cup		Asia		Total	
Club	Division	Season	Apps	Goals	Apps	Goals	Apps	Goals	Apps	Goals
Rah Ahan	Pro League	2015–16	4	0	1	0	–	–	5	0
Career Totals			4	0	1	0	0	0	5	0
