= Soroush Saeidi =

Iranian footballer

Personal information
- Full name: Soroush Saeidi Broujeni سروش سعیدی بروجنی
- Date of birth: 6 June 1991 (age 35)
- Place of birth: Izeh, Iran
- Height: 1.74 m (5 ft 9 in)
- Position: Defender

Team information
- Current team: Shahrdari Mahshahr

Youth career
- 2007–2012: Foolad

Senior career*
Years	Team	Apps	(Gls)
2011–2017	Foolad	19	(0)
2015–2016	→ Fajr Sepasi (loan)	12	(2)
2017–	Shahrdari Mahshahr	0	(0)

International career
2008–2010	Iran U–20		
- * Club domestic league appearances and goals as of 11 December 2014

Soroush Saeidi (Persian: سروش سعیدی); is an Iranian football defender who currently plays for Iranian football club Shahrdari Mahshahr in the Azadegan League.

== Club career ==
=== Foolad ===
He started his career with Foolad from youth levels. He was promoted to the first team in summer 2011 and signed a four-year contract extension which kept him at Foolad until 2018. He made his debut for Foolad on 22 November 2014 against Saba Qom as a starter.

== Club career statistics ==
As of 11 December 2014.

Club	Division	Season	League		Hazfi Cup		Asia		Total	
Club	Division	Season	Apps	Goals	Apps	Goals	Apps	Goals	Apps	Goals
Foolad	Pro League	2011–12	0	0	0	0	–	–	0	0
Foolad	Pro League	2012–13	0	0	0	0	–	–	0	0
Foolad	Pro League	2013–14	0	0	0	0	1	0	0	0
Foolad	Pro League	2014–15	2	0	0	0	0	0	2	0
Career Totals			2	0	0	0	1	0	3	0
