= Mohammad Amin Rezaei =

Footballer

Personal information
- Date of birth: 21 August 1996 (age 30)
- Place of birth: Amol, Iran
- Height: 1.89 m (6 ft 2 in)
- Position: Goalkeeper

Team information
- Current team: Esteghlal Khuzestan
- Number: 78

Youth career
- 2015: Persepolis
- 2015: Paykan

Senior career*
| Years | Team | Apps | (Gls) |
| 2017–2020 | Nassaji | 12 | (0) |
| 2020–2021 | Machine Sazi | 23 | (0) |
| 2021–2022 | Mes Shahr-e Babak | 26 | (0) |
| 2022–2023 | Shahrdari Astara | 30 | (0) |
| 2023–2024 | Mes Kerman | 31 | (0) |
| 2024–2025 | Shams Azar | 11 | (0) |
| 2025 | Shahrdari Nowshahr | 14 | (0) |
| 2025–2026 | Havadar | 16 | (0) |
| 2026 | Sanat Naft | 12 | (0) |
| 2026– | Esteghlal Khuzestan | 9 | (0) |
- * Club domestic league appearances and goals as of 13:00, 8 November 2019 (UTC)

Mohammad Amin Rezaei (born 21 August 1996) is a footballer who plays for Esteghlal Khuzestan in the Persian Gulf Pro League as a Goalkeeper.
