= Reza Darvishi =

Iranian football midfielder

Personal information
- Date of birth: 20 November 1986 (age 39)
- Place of birth: Andimeshk, Iran
- Height: 1.83 m (6 ft 0 in)
- Position: Midfielder

Youth career
- Naft Ahvaz
- Esteghlal Ahvaz
- Foolad

Senior career*
Years	Team	Apps	(Gls)
2006–2007	Foolad		
2007–2012	Foolad B		
2012–2015	Naft Masjed Soleyman	59	(7)
2015–2016	Malavan	20	(1)
2016–2017	Siah Jamegan	8	(1)
2017	Baadraan	11	(1)
2017–2018	Gol Gohar	3	(0)
2018	Gol Reyhan	3	(0)
2018–2019	Esteghlal Khuzestan	27	(1)
2019–2020	Malavan	15	(2)

International career
- Iran U17
- * Club domestic league appearances and goals

Reza Darvishi (Persian: رضا درویشی, born 20 November 1986) is an Iranian former football midfielder.
