= Alireza Azimi =

Iranian footballer

Personal information
- Date of birth: 12 October 1992 (age 34)
- Place of birth: Mianeh, Iran
- Height: 1.83 m (6 ft 0 in)
- Position: Striker

Team information
- Current team: Chala Sangsar

Youth career
- 2004–2006: Bargh Tehran
- 2006–2007: Steel Azin
- 2007–2013: Rah Ahan

Senior career*
Years	Team	Apps	(Gls)
2012–2015	Rah Ahan	25	(3)
2015–2016	Khoneh Be Khoneh	22	(2)
2016	Malavan	2	(0)
2017	Fajr Sepasi		
2017–2018	Kimiya Farayand		
2020–2021	Spad Alvand		
2023–	Chala Sangsar		
- * Club domestic league appearances and goals as of 14 December 2016

Alireza Azimi (Persian: علیرضا عظیمی; born 12 October 1992) is an Iranian footballer who plays for Chala Sangsar.

== Club career ==
Alizadeh started his career with Rah Ahan at the youth level. He was promoted to the first team in the summer of 2012 by the coach, Ali Daei. He scored his first goal for Rah Ahan against Tehrani giant, Persepolis on 10 March 2013.

=== Club career statistics ===
Last Update 10 May 2014

Club	Division	Season	League		Hazfi Cup		Asia		Total	
Club	Division	Season	Apps	Goals	Apps	Goals	Apps	Goals	Apps	Goals
Rah Ahan	Pro League	2012–13	6	1	1	0	–	–	7	1
Rah Ahan	Pro League	2013–14	11	2	3	1	–	–	14	3
Career Total			17	3	4	1	0	0	21	4
