= Saeid Ghomi =

Iranian footballer

Personal information
- Full name: Saeid Mohammad Ghomi
- Date of birth: 28 August 1994 (age 32)
- Place of birth: Tehran, Iran
- Position: Forward

Team information
- Current team: Saba Qom
- Number: 27

Youth career
- –2014: Damash Tehran
- 2014–2015: Naft Tehran

Senior career*
Years	Team	Apps	(Gls)
2015	Naft Tehran	0	(0)
2015–	Saba Qom	1	(0)
- * Club domestic league appearances and goals as of 24 September 2015

Saeid Ghomi (Persian: سعید قمی); is an Iranian football forward who plays for Saba Qom in the Iran Pro League.

== Club career ==
Ghomi was part of Naft Tehran Academy from summer 2014. He promoted to first team in winter 2015 but failed in making any appearances. In summer 2015 he joined to Saba Qom. he made his professional debut for Saba Qom in 1–0 win against Sepahan On 26 September 2015, as a substitute for Jalaleddin Alimohammadi.

== Club career statistics ==
As of 24 September 2015.

Club	Division	Season	League		Hazfi Cup		Asia		Total	
Club	Division	Season	Apps	Goals	Apps	Goals	Apps	Goals	Apps	Goals
Naft Tehran	Pro League	2014–15	0	0	0	0	0	0	0	0
Saba Qom	Pro League	2015–16	1	0	0	0	–	–	1	0
Career Totals			1	0	0	0	0	0	1	0
