= Vahid Asgari =

Iranian footballer (born 1985)

Personal information
- Date of birth: 20 March 1985 (age 41)
- Place of birth: Mashhad, Iran
- Height: 1.82 m (6 ft 0 in)
- Position: Defender

Youth career
- 2000–2002: Fath Mashhad
- Aboomoslem

Senior career*
Years	Team	Apps	(Gls)
2006–2010	Aboomoslem	64	(2)
2010–2011	Tarbiat Yazd	23	(2)
2011–2013	Aluminium Hormozgan	23	(0)
2013–2014	Padideh	21	(1)
2015–2016	Khoneh Be Khoneh	20	(1)
2016	Baadraan	10	(0)
2017–2018	Siah Jamegan	33	(1)
2018	Arvand Khorramshahr	8	(0)
- * Club domestic league appearances and goals

Vahid Asgari (Persian: وحید عسگری; born 20 March 1985) is an Iranian former football defender.

== Career ==
Asgari is a part of Aboomoslem squad since 2006.

=== Club Career Statistics ===
As of 8 August 2014.

Club	Division	Season	League		Hazfi Cup		Asia		Total	
Club	Division	Season	Apps	Goals	Apps	Goals	Apps	Goals	Apps	Goals
Aboomoslem	Pro League	2006–07	12	0			–	–		
Aboomoslem	Pro League	2007–08	22	1			–	–		
Aboomoslem	Pro League	2008–09	20	0			–	–		
Aboomoslem	Pro League	2009–10	8	1			–	–		
Tarbiat Yazd	Division 1	2010–11	23	2			–	–		
Aluminium	Division 1	2011–12	18	0			–	–		
Aluminium	Pro League	2012–13	21	0	0	0	–	–	21	0
Padideh	Division 1	2013–14	18	1	1	0	–	–	19	1
Padideh	Pro League	2014–15	1	0	0	0	–	–	1	0
Career total			143	5			0	0		
