= Mehdi Mohammadpour =

Iranian footballer

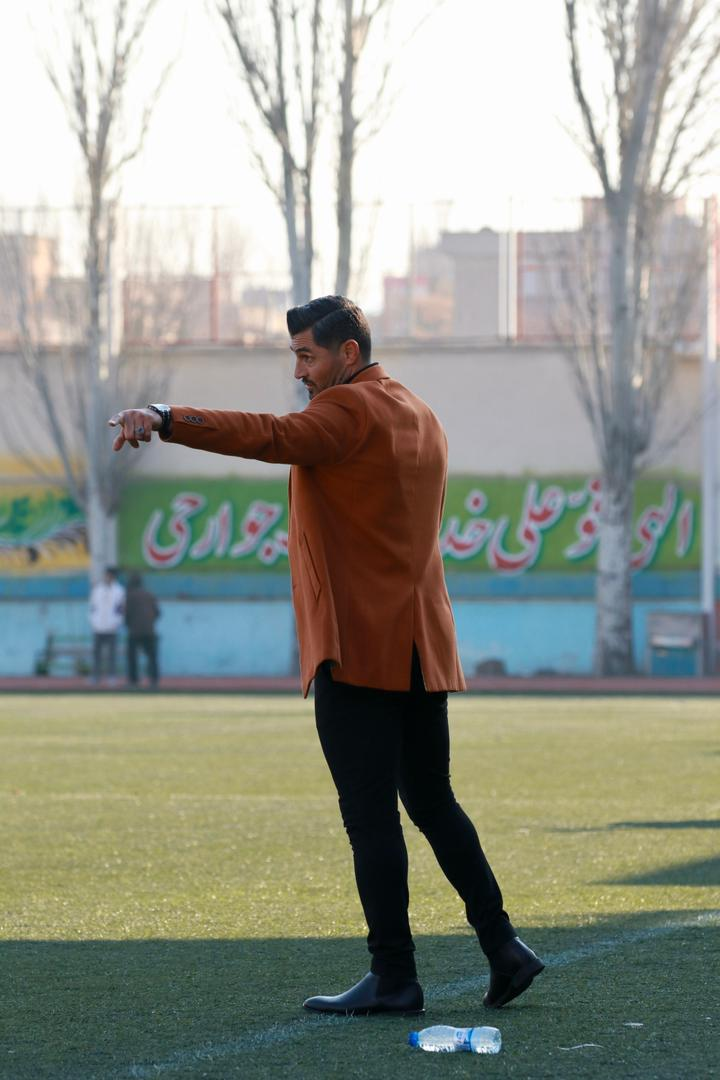
- Mahdi Mohammadpour

Personal information
- Full name: Mehdi Mohammadpour
- Date of birth: March 24, 1985
- Place of birth: Tabriz, Iran
- Height: 1.87 m (6 ft 2 in)
- Position: Defender

Team information
- Current team: Nassaji

Youth career
- Tractor

Senior career*
Years	Team	Apps	(Gls)
2003–2009	Tractor		
2009–2013	Shahrdari Tabriz	32	(1)
2013–2014	Gostaresh Foulad	7	(1)
2014–2015	Shahrdari Ardabil	14	(1)
2015–2016	Mashin Sazi	27	(0)
2016–	Nassaji	0	(0)
- * Club domestic league appearances and goals

Mehdi Mohammadpour (Persian: مهدي محمدپور) is an Iranian footballer who plays as a defender for Nassaji Mazandaran in the Azadegan League.

== Club career statistics ==
As of 8 July 2016.

Club	Division	Season	League		Hazfi Cup		Asia		Total	
Club	Division	Season	Apps	Goals	Apps	Goals	Apps	Goals	Apps	Goals
Shahrdari Tabriz	Pro League	2010–11	12	0	0	0	–	–	12	0
Shahrdari Tabriz	Pro League	2011–12	8	1	0	0	–	–	8	1
Shahrdari Tabriz	Azadegan League	2012–13	8	0	0	0	–	–	8	0
Gostaresh Foulad	Pro League	2013–14	7	1	0	0	–	–	7	1
Shahrdari Ardabil	Azadegan League	2014–15	14	1	0	0	–	–	14	1
Mashin Sazi	Azadegan League	2015–16	27	0	0	0	–	–	27	0
Career Totals			76	3	0	0	0	0	76	3
