= Reza Bahmaei =

Iranian football player (born 1994)

Personal information
- Full name: Reza Bahmaei
- Date of birth: September 24, 1994 (age 32)
- Place of birth: Baghmalek, Iran
- Position: Forward

Team information
- Current team: Esteghlal Ahvaz
- Number: 24

Youth career
- 2012–2015: Foolad

Senior career*
Years	Team	Apps	(Gls)
2015–	Esteghlal Ahvaz	21	(0)
- * Club domestic league appearances and goals as of 14 May 2016

Reza Bahmaei (Persian: رضا بهمئی; born 24 September 1994) is an Iranian football forward who played for Esteghlal Ahvaz in the Iran Pro League.

== Club career ==
Khaziravi joined Esteghlal Ahvaz in the summer of 2015 after graduating from Foolad Academy. He made his professional debut on September 26, 2015, against Gostaresh Foulad where he was used as a starter.

== Club career statistics ==
As of end of 2015–16 season

Club	Division	Season	League		Hazfi Cup		Asia		Total	
Club	Division	Season	Apps	Goals	Apps	Goals	Apps	Goals	Apps	Goals
Esteghlal Ahvaz	Pro League	2015–16	21	0			–	–	21	0
Career totals			21	0	0	0	0	0	21	0
