= Saeid Mehdipour =

Iranian footballer

Personal information
- Full name: Saeid Mehdipour
- Date of birth: 14 March 1987 (age 39)
- Place of birth: Tabriz, Iran
- Height: 1.84 m (6 ft 1/2 in)
- Position: Center back

Senior career*
Years	Team	Apps	(Gls)
2008–2010	Petrochimi Tabriz		
2010–2011	Foolad Yazd		
2012–2014	Gostaresh Foulad	43	(1)
2014	Shahrdari Tabriz	1	(0)
2014–2015	Saba Qom	9	(0)
2015	Siah Jamegan	7	(0)
2015–2018	Machine Sazi	29	(1)
- * Club domestic league appearances and goals as of 1 January 2019

Saeid Mehdipour (Persian: سعید مهدی‌پور); is a retired Iranian football defender who currently plays for the Iranian football club Machine Sazi in the Iran Pro League.

== Club career ==
=== Gostaresh Foulad ===
Mehdipour was a part of Gostaresh Foulad from 2012 to 2014. In the summer of 2014 he terminated his contract with the Tabrizi side.

=== Shahrdari Tabriz ===
In summer 2014, Mehdipour signed a contract with Tractor Sazi but the Iran Football League Organization did not let him play for Tractor Sazi until mid-season as of their full Pro League quota. In August 2014 he joined Shahrdari Tabriz. He made just one appearance for Shahrdari Tabriz and on 19 November 2014 he was fired from the training camp by the club coach Mehdi Pashazadeh.

=== Saba Qom ===
Mehdipour joined Saba Qom in December 2014 under a contract until the end of the season. He made his debut against Sepahan as a starter on 10 December 2014.

== Club career statistics ==
As of 15 May 2015.

Club	Division	Season	League		Hazfi Cup		Asia		Total	
Club	Division	Season	Apps	Goals	Apps	Goals	Apps	Goals	Apps	Goals
Gostaresh Foolad	Division 1	2012–13	24	1	–	–	–	–	24	1
Gostaresh Foolad	Pro League	2013–14	20	0	1	0	–	–	21	0
Shahrdari Tabriz	Division 1	2014–15	1	0	0	0	–	–	1	0
Saba Qom	Pro League	2014–15	9	0	0	0	–	–	9	0
Siah Jamegan	Pro League	2015–16	7	0	0	0	–	–	7	0
Career Totals			61	1	1	0	0	0	62	1
