= Mohammad Ali Mardani =

Iranian footballer

Mohammad Alimardani
Personal information
- Date of birth: 26 August 1994 (age 32)
- Place of birth: Masjed Soleyman, Iran
- Height: 1.76 m (5 ft 9 in)
- Position: Forward

Youth career
- –2015: Fajr Sepasi

Senior career*
| Years | Team | Apps | (Gls) |
| 2014–2015 | Fajr Sepasi | 6 | (0) |
| 2015–2017 | Padideh | 27 | (4) |
| 2017–2018 | Shahrdari Tabriz | 3 | (0) |
| 2018 | Bargh Jadid | 3 | (0) |
| 2018–2019 | Gostaresh | | |
| 2019–2020 | Shohada Babolsar | 1 | (1) |
| 2020–2021 | Bandar Abbas | 1 | (0) |
| 2021–2022 | Naft M.I.S. | 2 | (0) |

International career
| 2014–2016 | Iran U23 | 1 | (0) |
- * Club domestic league appearances and goals

Mohammad Alimardani (Persian: محمد علی‌مردانی; born 26 August 1994) is an Iranian former football forward.

== Club career ==
=== Padideh ===
He joined Padideh in summer 2015 with two-years contract. He made his debut for Padideh in 2015–16 Iran Pro League against Saba Qom as substitute for Younes Shakeri. icipating in the 2014 AFC U-19 Championship.

== Club career statistics ==
As of 17 December 2015.

| Club | Division | Season | League | | Hazfi Cup | | Asia | | Total | |
| Club | Division | Season | Apps | Goals | Apps | Goals | Apps | Goals | Apps | Goals |
|---|---|---|---|---|---|---|---|---|---|---|
| Fajr Sepasi | Division 1 | 2014–15 | 6 | 0 | 3 | 2 | – | – | 9 | 2 |
| Padideh | Pro League | 2015–16 | 7 | 1 | 2 | 0 | – | – | 9 | 1 |
| Career Totals | | | 13 | 1 | 5 | 2 | 0 | 0 | 18 | 3 |
