= Ali Choupani =

Iranian football forward

Personal information
- Full name: Ali Choupani Deh Sorkhi
- Date of birth: 26 April 1993 (age 33)
- Place of birth: Isfahan, Iran
- Height: 1.78 m (5 ft 10 in)
- Position: Forward

Youth career
- 2009–2014: Sepahan

Senior career*
Years	Team	Apps	(Gls)
2012–2015	Sepahan	0	(0)
2014–2015	→ Padideh (loan)	6	(0)
2015–2016	Khoneh Be Khoneh	0	(0)
2017–2018	Shahrdari Bam	1	(0)

International career
2010–2012	Iran U20	11	(0)
- * Club domestic league appearances and goals

Ali Choupani (Persian: علی چوپانی; born 26 April 1993) is an Iranian former football forward.

== Club career ==
=== Sepahan ===
Choupani started his career with Sepahan Academy. He promoted to first in 2012 after shining with Iran U20 and was given #26 but he never had any chances to make appearances. He signed a 3-year contract extension in summer 2014.

=== Padideh ===
He joined Padideh in summer 2014 while he signed one-year loan contract . He made his debut for Padideh against his former club Sepahan as a substitute for Abbas Mohammadrezaei in 2014–15 Iran Pro League.

== Club career statistics ==
As of 11 September 2014.

Club	Division	Season	League		Hazfi Cup		Asia		Total	
Club	Division	Season	Apps	Goals	Apps	Goals	Apps	Goals	Apps	Goals
Sepahan	Pro League	2012–13	0	0	0	0	0	0	0	0
Sepahan	Pro League	2013–14	0	0	0	0	0	0	0	0
Padideh	Pro League	2014–15	1	0	0	0	–	–	1	0
Career Totals			1	0	0	0	0	0	1	0
