= Mohammad Vahid Esmaeilbeigi =

Iranian Football Defender

Mohammad Vahid Esmaeil Beigi
Personal information
- Date of birth: 26 February 1992 (age 34)
- Place of birth: Kerman, Iran
- Height: 1.75 m (5 ft 9 in)
- Position: Right back

Youth career
- Mes Kerman

Senior career*
Years	Team	Apps	(Gls)
2009–2015	Mes Kerman	70	(1)
2010–2011	→ Mes Sarcheshmeh (loan)	21	(0)
2015–2016	Saipa	15	(0)
2016–2017	Mes Kerman	29	(1)
2017–2018	Sanat Naft Abadan	0	(0)
2018–2019	Mes Kerman	16	(0)
2019–2020	Baadraan Tehran	5	(0)
2020–2021	Mes Kerman	20	(0)
2022–2023	Mes Novin Kerman		

International career
2012–2014	Iran U22	8	(0)
2012	Iran	1	(0)
- * Club domestic league appearances and goals

Mohammad Vahid Esmaeil Beigi (Persian: محمدوحید اسماعیل بیگی; born 26 February 1992) is an Iranian former football defender.

== Club career ==
In the 2011–12 season, he made 22 appearances providing one assist for his teammates and in the 2012–13 season he played 13 games for his club, scoring a goal against Rah Ahan in a 4–0 win. He also provided one assist throughout the season.

=== Career statistics ===
As of 31 June 2015

Club	Division	Season	League		Hazfi Cup		Asia		Total	
Club	Division	Season	Apps	Goals	Apps	Goals	Apps	Goals	Apps	Goals
Mes Kerman	Pro League	2009–10	0	0	0	0	0	0	0	0
Mes SCH	Division 1	2010–11	21	0	1	0	–	–	22	0
Mes Kerman	Pro League	2011–12	22	0	3	0	–	–	25	0
Mes Kerman	Pro League	2012–13	14	1	0	0	–	–	14	1
Mes Kerman	Pro League	2013–14	19	0	3	0	–	–	22	0
Mes Kerman	Division 1	2014–15	15	0	0	0	–	–	17 (Note: Includes 2 Match in Pro League promotion play-offs)	0
Career Total			91	1	7	0	0	0	98	1

- Assists

Season	Team	Assists
13–14	Mes Kerman	2

== International career ==
=== Under-22 team ===
He was called up by Ali Reza Mansourian to participate in the Iran U-22 team's training camp in Italy.

=== Junior team ===
He made his debut under Carlos Queiroz on 15 December 2012 against Yemen in 2012 WAFF.

== Honours ==
Mes Kerman

- Hazfi Cup Runner-up (1): 2013–14
