= Mohammad Hossein Babagoli =

Iranian football (born 1997)

Personal information
- Full name: Mohammad Hossein Babagoli
- Date of birth: 7 May 1997 (age 29)
- Place of birth: Babol, Iran
- Position: Winger

Team information
- Current team: Nassaji
- Number: 23

Youth career
- –2015: Nassaji
- 2015–: Rah Ahan

Senior career*
| Years | Team | Apps | (Gls) |
| 2015–2016 | Rah Ahan | 1 | (0) |
| 2016–2019 | Khooneh be Khoneh | 0 | (0) |
| 2019–2021 | Nassaji | 11 | (0) |
| 2021-2022 | F.C. Rayka Babol | 6 | (3) |
| 2022 | Saipa F.C. | | |
- * Club domestic league appearances and goals as of 16 September 2015

Mohammad Hossein Babagoli (Persian: محمدحسین باباگلی) is an Iranian football winger who plays for Nassaji in the Persian Gulf Pro League.

== Club career ==
=== Rah Ahan ===
Babagoli joined Rah Ahan in summer 2015 under contract until 2020. He made his professional debut for Rah Ahan on 16 September 2015, in 1–0 loss against Malavan as a substitute for Mehdi Jafarpour.

== Club career statistics ==
As of 16 September 2015.

| Club | Division | Season | League | | Hazfi Cup | | Asia | | Total | |
| Club | Division | Season | Apps | Goals | Apps | Goals | Apps | Goals | Apps | Goals |
|---|---|---|---|---|---|---|---|---|---|---|
| Rah Ahan | Pro League | 2015–16 | 1 | 0 | 1 | 0 | – | – | 2 | 0 |
| Career totals | | | 1 | 0 | 1 | 0 | 0 | 0 | 2 | 0 |
