= Aram Abbasi =

Iranian footballer

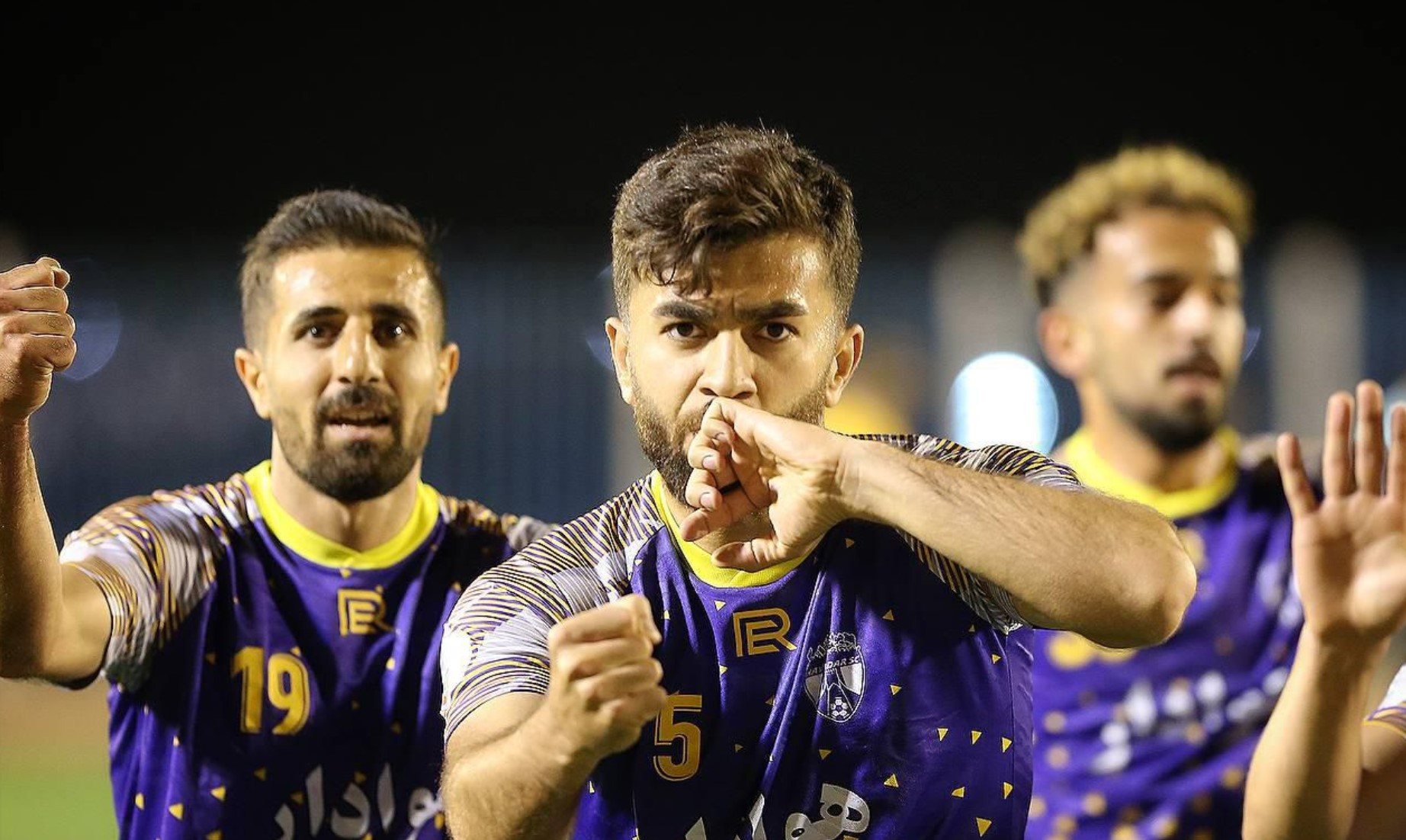

Personal information
- Date of birth: 13 July 1994 (age 32)
- Place of birth: Sanandaj, Iran
- Height: 1.91 m (6 ft 3 in)
- Position: Defender

Team information
- Current team: Esteghlal Khuzestan
- Number: 4

Youth career
- 2010–2014: Fajr Sepasi
- 2014–2015: Saba Qom

Senior career*
Years	Team	Apps	(Gls)
2014–2015	Saba Qom	21	(5)
2015–2016	Padideh	18	(2)
2016–2017	Sanat Naft	28	(3)
2017–2018	PAS Hamedan	19	(1)
2018–2019	Naft Tehran	18	(3)
2019–2020	Qashqai	18	(2)
2020–2022	Havadar	16	(0)
2022–2024	Fajr Sepasi	41	(5)
2024–	Esteghlal Khuzestan	53	(1)

International career
2007–2008	Iran U-14	8	(3)
2010–2012	Iran U-17	7	(1)
2012–2014	Iran U-20	10	(2)
2014	Iran U-23	8	(3)
- * Club domestic league appearances and goals as of 30 October 2024

Aram Abbasi (Persian: آرام عباسی; born 13 July 1994) is an Iranian football defender who plays for Esteghlal Khuzestan.

In the Iran Pro League. Abbasi started his career with Fajr Sepasi from youth levels. He joined Saba Qom on July 27, 2014, with a 2-year contract. He made his debut against Sepahan on September 18, 2014, as a substitute for Hossein Badamaki.
