= Hossein Karimi =

Iranian footballer

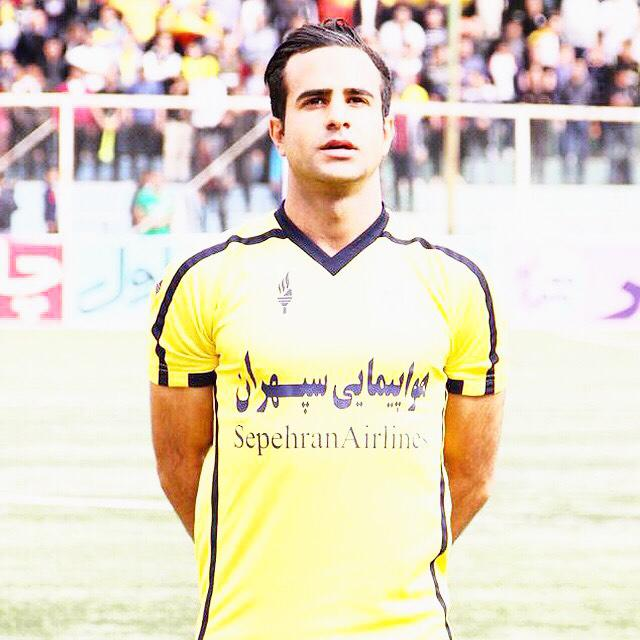

Personal information
- Full name: Seyyed Hossein Karimi
- Date of birth: 22 March 1992 (age 34)
- Place of birth: Shiraz, Iran
- Height: 1.81 m (5 ft 11 in)
- Position: Attacking midfielder

Youth career
- –2013: Fajr Sepasi

Senior career*
Years	Team	Apps	(Gls)
2011–2013	Fajr Sepasi	5	(0)
2013–2015	Paykan	19	(4)
2015	Rah Ahan	10	(1)
2015–2016	Siah Jamegan	11	(2)
2016–2017	Khooneh be Khooneh	6	(1)
2017–2018	Nassaji	3	(0)
2018	Fajr Sepasi	6	(2)
2018–2019	Sorkhpooshan	6	(1)
2019–2020	Baadraan	5	(0)
2020–2021	Fajr Sepasi		

International career
2011–2012	Iran U21	15	(8)
2013	Iran U23	3	(0)
- * Club domestic league appearances and goals

Seyed Hossein Karimi (Persian: سید حسین کریمی; born 22 March 1992) is an Iranian former football midfielder.

== Club career ==
=== Early years ===
He started his career with Fajr Sepasi Academy. In summer 2011 he was promoted to the first team by Mahmoud Yavari. He made his debut for Fajr Sepasi on 29 January 2011 against Sepahan.

=== Paykan ===
Karimi joined Paykan in winter 2013. He made his debut for Paykan on 12 January 2014 against Aboumoslem as a starter and scored in the 45th minute. He helped Paykan gain promotion to the Pro League by scoring 3 times in 11 matches.

== Club career statistics ==
As of 31 October 2014

Club	Division	Season	League		Hazfi Cup		Asia		Total	
Club	Division	Season	Apps	Goals	Apps	Goals	Apps	Goals	Apps	Goals
Fajr Sepasi	Pro League	2011–12	5	0	1	0	–	–	6	0
Fajr Sepasi	Pro League	2012–13	2	0	1	0	–	–	3	0
Fajr Sepasi	Pro League	2013–14	0	0	0	0	–	–	0	0
Paykan	Division 1	2013–14	11	3	0	0	–	–	11	3
Paykan	Pro League	2014–15	2	0	1	0	–	–	3	0
Career totals			20	3	3	0	0	0	23	3
