= Behtash Misaghian =

Iranian footballer (born 1988)

Personal information
- Full name: Behtash Misaghian
- Date of birth: March 2, 1988 (age 38)
- Place of birth: Mashhad, Iran
- Position: Left back

Team information
- Current team: Shahr Khodro
- Number: 20

Youth career
- 2002–2004: Fath Mashhad
- 2004–2008: Aboomoslem

Senior career*
Years	Team	Apps	(Gls)
2011–2013	Aluminium		
2013–2014	Padideh		
2014–2016	Mes		
2016–2017	Baderan Tehran		
2017–	Aboumoslem		
- * Club domestic league appearances and goals as of 9 April 2015

Behtash Misaghian (Persian: بهتاش میثاقیان; born 2 March 1988) is an Iranian football defender who plays for Shahr Khodro F.C. in the Iran Pro League.

== Club career statistics ==
As of 19 September 2014.

Club	Division	Season	League		Hazfi Cup		Asia		Total	
Club	Division	Season	Apps	Goals	Apps	Goals	Apps	Goals	Apps	Goals
Padideh	Division 1	2013–14	25	0	0	0	–	–	25	0
Baderan	Pro League	2014–15	22	1	0	0	–	–	22	1
Baderan	Division 1	2015–16	14	1	1	0	–	–	15	1
Career Totals			61	2	1	0	0	0	62	2
