= Mohammad Soleiman Alizadeh =

Iranian footballer

Personal information
- Date of birth: 27 September 1991 (age 35)
- Place of birth: Chamestan, Iran
- Height: 1.74 m (5 ft 9 in)
- Position: Midfielder

Youth career
- 2006–2012: Rah Ahan

Senior career*
Years	Team	Apps	(Gls)
2012–2015	Rah Ahan	17	(0)
2015	Mes Kerman	19	(1)
2015–2017	Khooneh be Khooneh	54	(0)
2017–2018	Mes Kerman	25	(0)
2018–2019	Karoon Arvand	9	(0)
2019	Sepidrood	8	(0)

International career
2012	Iran U22	1	(0)
- * Club domestic league appearances and goals as of 1 July 2019

Mohammad Soleiman Alizadeh (Persian: محمدسلیمان علیزاده; born 27 September 1991) is an Iranian footballer who plays as a midfielder.

== Club career ==
Alizadeh started his career as a youth player at Rah Ahan. He was promoted to the first team in the summer of 2012 by head coach Ali Daei.

== Career statistics ==
As of 1 July 2019

Club	Season	League			Cup		Continental		Other		Total	
Club	Season	Division	Apps	Goals	Apps	Goals	Apps	Goals	Apps	Goals	Apps	Goals
Rah Ahan	2012–13	Persian Gulf Cup	2	0	0	0	—		—		2	0
Rah Ahan	2013–14	Persian Gulf Cup	13	0	2	0	—		—		15	0
Rah Ahan	2014–15	Persian Gulf Pro League	2	0	0	0	—		—		2	0
Rah Ahan	Total		17	0	2	0	0	0	0	0	19	0
Mes Kerman	2014–15	Azadegan League	19	1	0	0	—		—		19	1
Khooneh be Khooneh	2015–16	Azadegan League	33	0	0	0	—		—		33	0
Khooneh be Khooneh	2016–17	Azadegan League	21	0	1	0	—		—		22	0
Khooneh be Khooneh	Total		54	0	1	0	0	0	0	0	55	0
Mes Kerman	2017–18	Azadegan League	25	0	0	0	—		—		25	0
Karoon Arvand	2018–19	Azadegan League	9	0	0	0	—		—		9	0
Sepidrood	2018–19	Persian Gulf Pro League	8	0	1	0	—		—		9	0
Career total			132	1	4	0	0	0	0	0	136	1
