= Navid Khosh Hava =

Iranian footballer (1991–2021)

Personal information
- Date of birth: 20 July 1991
- Place of birth: Ardabil, Iran
- Date of death: 4 December 2021 (aged 30)
- Position: Defender

Youth career
- 2007–2010: Zob Ahan Ardabil
- 2010–2011: Shahrdari Ardabil
- 2011–2012: Persepolis

Senior career*
Years	Team	Apps	(Gls)
2012–2014	Tractor Sazi	4	(1)
2014–2015	Rah Ahan	7	(0)
2015–2016	Paykan	8	(0)
2016–2017	Pas Hamadan	6	(0)
2017	Shahrdari Ardabil	6	(0)

International career
2013	Iran U23	3	(0)
- * Club domestic league appearances and goals

Navid Khosh Hava (20 July 1991 – 4 December 2021) was an Iranian professional footballer who played as a defender.

== Club career ==
Khosh Hava made his debut against Rah Ahan coming on as an 88th-minute substitute for Farzad Hatami. In the following match, a 2–2 draw with Saipa, he Hava scored a goal in the 50th minute.

On 30 November 2014, Khosh Hava joined Rah Ahan.

Khosh Hava signed with Peykan in 2015. He left the club in January 2016 to join Pas Hamadan.

== Death ==
Khosh Hava died following a cardiac arrest on 4 December 2021, at the age of 30.
