= Mobin Mirdoraghi =

Iranian football defender (born 1993)

Personal information
- Full name: Mobin Mirdoraghi
- Date of birth: April 19, 1993 (age 33)
- Place of birth: Andimeshk, Iran
- Height: 1.82 m (6 ft 0 in)
- Position: Right back

Youth career
- Sepahan
- 2013: Persepolis
- 2013–2014: Paykan

Senior career*
Years	Team	Apps	(Gls)
2013–2014	Paykan	0	(0)
2014	Saipa	0	(0)
2015	Persepolis	0	(0)
2015–2016	Esteghlal Ahvaz	8	(0)
2016	Giti Pasand	3	(0)
2017	Panserraikos	5	(0)
2017–2018	Sparta	0	(0)
- * Club domestic league appearances and goals as of 30 June 2017

Mobin Mirdoraghi (Persian: مبین میردورقی) is an Iranian football defender. His brother, Armin, is also a professional footballer.

== Club career ==
Mirdoraghi started his career with Sepahan from youth levels. He moved to Paykan in 2013. In summer 2014 he joined to Saipa and made an appearance in Hazfi Cup. In mid season he joined to Persepolis but failed in making any appearances. In July 2015 he joined to Esteghlal Ahvaz and made his debut against Saba Qom on July 30, 2015. Mirdoraghi moved to Panserraikos of the Greek second-division in February 2017.

== Career statistics ==
As of 23 May 2018

Club	Division	Season	League		Cup		Continental		Total	
Club	Division	Season	Apps	Goals	Apps	Goals	Apps	Goals	Apps	Goals
Paykan	Division 1	2013–14	0	0	0	0	–	–	0	0
Saipa	Pro League	2014–15	0	0	1	0	–	–	1	0
Persepolis	Pro League	2014–15	0	0	0	0	0	0	0	0
Esteghlal Ahvaz	Pro League	2015–16	8	0	1	0	–	–	9	0
Giti Pasand	Division 1	2015–16	3	0	0	0	–	–	3	0
Panserraikos	Football League	2016–17	5	0	0	0	–	–	5	0
Sparta	Football League	2017–18	0	0	1	0	–	–	1	0
Career total			16	0	3	0	0	0	19	0
