= Danial Mahini =

Iranian footballer

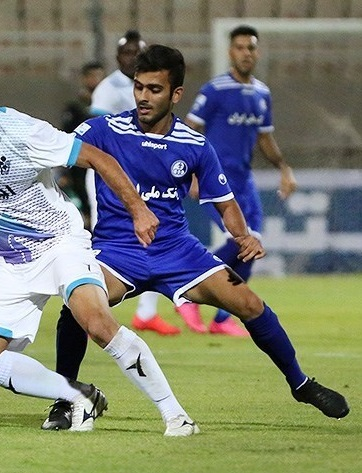

Personal information
- Date of birth: 25 September 1993 (age 33)
- Place of birth: Bushehr, Iran
- Height: 1.82 m (5 ft 11 1/2 in)
- Position: Right back

Team information
- Current team: Palayesh Naft
- Number: 28

Youth career
- 2004–2014: Iranjavan

Senior career*
| Years | Team | Apps | (Gls) |
| 2012–2015 | Iranjavan | 18 | (0) |
| 2015–2017 | Esteghlal Khuzestan | 36 | (0) |
| 2017–2018 | Saipa | 7 | (0) |
| 2018–2020 | Esteghlal Khuzestan | 5 | (0) |
| 2018–2019 | → Malavan (loan) | 6 | (0) |
| 2019–2020 | → Iranjavan (loan) | 12 | (0) |
| 2020–2022 | Paykan | 10 | (0) |
| 2023 | Arman Gohar | 13 | (0) |
| 2023–2024 | Metallurg Bekabad | 11 | (0) |
| 2024 | Mes Shahr-e Babak | 8 | (0) |
| 2024–2025 | Havadar | 1 | (0) |
| 2025– | Palayesh Naft | 7 | (0) |

International career^{‡}
| 2016– | Iran | 1 | (0) |
- * Club domestic league appearances and goals as of 22 April 2025 ‡ National team caps and goals as of 7 June 2016

Danial Mahini (Persian: دانیال ماهینی; born 25 September 1993) is an Iranian football defender who plays for Palayesh Naft in the Azadegan League.

== Club career ==
Mahini started his career with Iranjavan as a youth player. He advanced to the first team in 2012. In the summer 2015 he joined Esteghlal Khuzestan with a 2-year contract. He made his debut for Esteghlal Khuzestan on 30 July 2015 against Sepahan as a starter.

== Club career statistics ==
As of 24 December 2017

| Club | Division | Season | League | | Hazfi Cup | | Asia | | Total | |
| Club | Division | Season | Apps | Goals | Apps | Goals | Apps | Goals | Apps | Goals |
|---|---|---|---|---|---|---|---|---|---|---|
| Iranjavan | Azadegan League | 2012-13 | 2 | 0 | 0 | 0 | – | – | 2 | 0 |
| Iranjavan | Azadegan League | 2013-14 | 0 | 0 | 0 | 0 | – | – | 0 | 0 |
| Iranjavan | Azadegan League | 2014-15 | 16 | 0 | 0 | 0 | – | – | 16 | 0 |
| Esteghlal Kh. | Persian Gulf Pro League | 2015-16 | 8 | 0 | 2 | 0 | – | – | 10 | 0 |
| Esteghlal Kh. | Persian Gulf Pro League | 2016-17 | 27 | 0 | 2 | 0 | 8 | 0 | 37 | 0 |
| Saipa | Persian Gulf Pro League | 2017-18 | 14 | 0 | 1 | 0 | – | – | 15 | 0 |
| Career totals | | | 67 | 0 | 5 | 0 | 8 | 0 | 80 | 0 |

== International career ==
He made his debut with the Iran national football team on 7 June 2016 in a friendly match against Kyrgyzstan that ended with a 6–0 result in favor of the Iranian team after goals from Sardar Azmoun, Masoud Shojaei, Mehdi Torabi, Mehdi Taremi and a brace from Karim Ansarifard.

== Honours ==
Esteghlal Khuzestan

- Persian Gulf Pro League (1): 2015–16
- Iranian Super Cup runner-up: 2016
