= Hamzeh Khaziravi =

Iranian footballer

Personal information
- Date of birth: 3 August 1994 (age 32)
- Place of birth: Ahvaz, Iran
- Height: 1.86 m (6 ft 1 in)
- Position: Midfielder

Youth career
- 2009–2014: Naft Ahvaz
- 2014–2015: Foolad

Senior career*
Years	Team	Apps	(Gls)
2015–2016	Esteghlal Ahvaz	24	(4)
2016–2017	Padideh	7	(0)
2017–2018	Baadraan	7	(1)
2018–2019	Sorkhpooshan	3	(0)
2019–2020	Moghavemat	2	(1)
2020–2021	Shahin Bushehr	5	(1)
2022	Bandar Astara	1	(0)
2022–2023	Esteghlal Mollasani	9	(3)
2023–2024	Naft M.I.S.	2	(0)
- * Club domestic league appearances and goals as of 10 June 2024

Hamzeh Khaziravi (Persian: حمزه خذیراوی; born 3 August 1994) is an Iranian football forward.

== Club career ==
Khaziravi joined Esteghlal Ahvaz in summer 2015, after graduating from Foolad Academy. He made his debut for Esteghlal Ahvaz on 30 July 2015 against Saba Qom where he used as a substitute for Mohammad Gholami.

== Club career statistics ==
As of 30 July 2015

Club	Division	Season	League		Hazfi Cup		Asia		Total	
Club	Division	Season	Apps	Goals	Apps	Goals	Apps	Goals	Apps	Goals
Esteghlal Ahvaz	Pro League	2015–16	24	4	0	0	–	–	24	4
Career Totals			24	4	0	0	0	0	24	4
