= Ahmad Mehdizadeh =

Iranian footballer

Personal information
- Full name: Seyed Ahmad Mehdizadeh
- Date of birth: 1 March 1987 (age 39)
- Place of birth: Qaemshahr, Iran
- Height: 1.79 m (5 ft 10 in)
- Position: Right back

Team information
- Current team: Parvaz Simorgh
- Number: 15

Senior career*
Years	Team	Apps	(Gls)
2009–2011	Mes Rafsanjan		
2011–2013	Paykan		
2013–2014	Malavan	23	(0)
2014–2015	Saba Qom	12	(0)
2015	Paykan	11	(0)
2015–2016	Rah Ahan	27	(0)
2016–2017	Baadraan Tehran	27	(0)
2017–2018	Saipa	8	(1)
2018–2019	Machine Sazi	22	(0)
2020–2021	Malavan	9	(0)
2021–2022	Shohada Babolsar		
2023–2024	Shohada Sari		
2024–	Parvaz Simorgh		
- * Club domestic league appearances and goals as of 7 March 2021

Seyed Ahmad Mehdizadeh (Persian: سید احمد مهدی زاده; born 1 March 1987) is an Iranian footballer who plays for Parvaz Simorgh.
