= List of Iranian football transfers winter 2014–15 =

This is a list of Iranian football transfers for the 2014–15 winter transfer window. Transfers of Iran Pro League are listed. The transfer window opened on 1 December 2014 and closed on 28 December. On 27 December, the transfer deadline for players who contracted with Iranian clubs was extended till 30 December 2014.

== Rules and regulations ==
The Iranian Football Clubs who participate in 2014–15 Iran Pro League are allowed to have up to maximum 35 players (including up to maximum 4 non-Iranian players) in their player lists, which will be categorized in the following groups:

- Up to maximum 18 adult (without any age limit) players
- Up to maximum 9 under-23 players (i.e. the player whose birth is after 1 January 1992).
- Up to maximum 8 under-21 players (i.e. the player whose birth is after 1 January 1994).

According to Iran Football Federation rules for 2013-14 Football Season, each Football Club is allowed to take up to maximum 6 new players . In addition to these six new players, each club is allowed to take up to maximum 4 non-Iranian new players (at least one of them should be Asian) and up to 3 players from Free agent (who did not play in 2013–14 Iran Pro League season or doesn't list in any 2014–15 League after season's start). After Conscription Scandal in Iranian Football, as compensation for clubs that damaged in this progress the clubs allowed to add more players such that for each soldier they can add one extra player. Also Clubs that played in AFC champions League can add 5+1 foreigners instead of normal 3+1 quota.

== Iran Pro League ==
=== Esteghlal ===
In: Note: Flags indicate national team as defined under FIFA eligibility rules; some limited exceptions apply. Players may hold more than one non-FIFA nationality.

No.	Pos.	Nation	Player
20	DF	IRN	Majid Hosseini (from Saipa U21)
29	FW	IRN	Milad Soleiman Fallah (from Naft Masjed Soleyman)
—	FW	IRN	Milad Kermani (from Saipa)
22	GK	IRN	Vahid Taleblou (from Rah Ahan)
99	MF	IRN	Milad Nouri (from Paykan)
80	FW	IRN	Reza Enayati (from Padideh)
44	FW	IRN	Behnam Barzay (from Rah Ahan)

Out: Note: Flags indicate national team as defined under FIFA eligibility rules; some limited exceptions apply. Players may hold more than one non-FIFA nationality.

No.	Pos.	Nation	Player
30	MF	IRN	Saeid Amraei (Released)
8	MF	IRN	Pejman Nouri (to Malavan)
12	GK	BRA	Alberto Rafael da Silva (to (Brazil) Cabofriense)
14	MF	IRN	Andranik Teymourian (to Tractor Sazi)
—	FW	IRN	Milad Kermani (to Khoneh Be Khoneh)
11	FW	IRN	Mohammad Ghazi (to Foolad)
32	MF	IRN	Amir Hossein Tahuni (on loan at Nassaji)
40	GK	IRN	Abbas Bakhtiari (to Nassaji)

=== Esteghlal Khuzestan ===
In: Note: Flags indicate national team as defined under FIFA eligibility rules; some limited exceptions apply. Players may hold more than one non-FIFA nationality.

No.	Pos.	Nation	Player
21	MF	IRN	Meysam Baou (from Free agent)
24	FW	IRN	Hojjat Chaharmahali (from Free agent)
99	FW	IRN	Mehdi Seyed Salehi (from Saipa)
88	DF	IRN	Mohsen Bayat (from Saba Qom)
14	MF	IRN	Hamed Mohammadi (from Free agent)

Out: Note: Flags indicate national team as defined under FIFA eligibility rules; some limited exceptions apply. Players may hold more than one non-FIFA nationality.

No.	Pos.	Nation	Player
13	FW	IRN	Ebrahim Salehi (Conscription)
23	FW	IRN	Hassan Moaavi (to Nirouye Zamini – Conscription)
15	FW	IRN	Sadegh Sadeghi Baba-Ahmadi (to Esteghlal Ahvaz)
30	FW	IRN	Mohammad Ousani (to Saba Qom)

=== Foolad ===
In: Note: Flags indicate national team as defined under FIFA eligibility rules; some limited exceptions apply. Players may hold more than one non-FIFA nationality.

No.	Pos.	Nation	Player
17	FW	CMR	Aloys Nong (from (Spain) Levante)
2	DF	IRN	Ahmad Alenemeh (from Tractor Sazi)
99	FW	IRN	Mohammad Ghazi (from Esteghlal)
77	MF	IRN	Mohsen Mosalman (on loan from Zob Ahan)
18	MF	IRN	Sina Moridi (promoted from Foolad U21)

Out: Note: Flags indicate national team as defined under FIFA eligibility rules; some limited exceptions apply. Players may hold more than one non-FIFA nationality.

No.	Pos.	Nation	Player
16	FW	IRN	Arash Afshin (to Malavan – Conscription)
23	MF	IRN	Valid Mashaeizadeh (to Nirouye Zamini – Conscription)
20	MF	IRN	Ahmad Abdollahzadeh (to Nirouye Zamini – Conscription)
28	FW	IRN	Mehdi Niyayesh Pour (to Foolad Novin)

=== Gostaresh Foolad ===
In: Note: Flags indicate national team as defined under FIFA eligibility rules; some limited exceptions apply. Players may hold more than one non-FIFA nationality.

No.	Pos.	Nation	Player
70	MF	IRN	Ali Reza Latifi (from Free agent)
5	FW	BRA	Leo Pimenta (from Free agent)
77	FW	IRN	Mohammad Ebrahimi (from Tractor Sazi)
30	FW	IRN	Mohsen Bayatinia (from Free agent)
24	DF	IRN	Mohsen Hosseini (from Nassaji)
44	GK	IRN	Shahin Mahmoudi (promoted from Gostaresh Foulad U19)
36	DF	IRN	Ali Mortezaei (promoted from Gostaresh Foulad U21)
39	DF	IRN	Reza Kheyrdar (promoted from Gostaresh Foulad U21)
40	DF	IRN	Amin Taghizadeh (promoted from Gostaresh Foulad U21)
76	MF	IRN	Amin Khatibi (promoted from Gostaresh Foulad U19)
38	MF	IRN	Arash Ouchlar (promoted from Gostaresh Foulad U21)
37	FW	IRN	Shakour Parastar (promoted from Gostaresh Foulad U21)
99	DF	IRN	Mostafa Ekrami (from Mes Kerman)
28	MF	BRA	Diogo Orlando (from (Brazil) Portuguesa)
80	GK	IRN	Davoud Noushi Soufiani (from Tractor Sazi)
21	DF	IRN	Alireza Mirshafian (from Free agent)

Out: Note: Flags indicate national team as defined under FIFA eligibility rules; some limited exceptions apply. Players may hold more than one non-FIFA nationality.

No.	Pos.	Nation	Player
11	FW	IRN	Mehdi Nazari (to Padideh)
10	FW	IRN	Mehrdad Bayrami (to Tractor Sazi)
7	MF	IRN	Morteza Mahfouzi (to Shahrdari Tabriz)
3	DF	IRN	Mehdi Qoreyshi (to Tractor Sazi)
33	GK	URU	Rodrigo López Odriozola (to (Colombia) Pasto)
20	DF	IRN	Mohamad Mokhtari (to Mes Kerman)
31	DF	IRN	Behnam Dadashvand (to Mes Kerman)
4	DF	IRN	Mahmoud Khamisi (to Siah Jamegan)
15	FW	IRN	Peyman Ranjbari (to Shahrdari Tabriz)
13	DF	IRN	Hamid Jokar (to Fajr Sepasi)

=== Malavan ===
In: Note: Flags indicate national team as defined under FIFA eligibility rules; some limited exceptions apply. Players may hold more than one non-FIFA nationality.

No.	Pos.	Nation	Player
—	DF	IRN	Hossein Mahini (from Persepolis – Conscription)
—	FW	IRN	Arash Afshin (from Foolad – Conscription)
8	MF	IRN	Pejman Nouri (from Esteghlal)
99	MF	IRN	Mohammad Abshak (from Rah Ahan)
88	FW	IRN	Foad Aghaei (from Haf Semnan)
38	FW	IRN	Farzad Hatami (from Mes Kerman)
34	MF	IRN	Farid Mokhtari (from Zob Ahan)
32	FW	IRN	Rouhollah Arab (from Free agent)

Out: Note: Flags indicate national team as defined under FIFA eligibility rules; some limited exceptions apply. Players may hold more than one non-FIFA nationality.

No.	Pos.	Nation	Player
7	MF	IRN	Saeid Ezatolahi (to (Spain) Atlético Madrid)
2	DF	IRN	Morteza Falahati (to Siah Jamegan)
4	DF	IRN	Nima Delavari (to Shahrdari Bandar Abbas)
11	FW	IRN	Mohammad Gholamin (Released)
18	MF	IRN	Hamid Golzari (Released)
24	FW	IRN	Mohammad Hadi Yaghoubi (to Shahrdari Bandar Abbas)
30	DF	IRN	Jamal Hosseini (Released)
77	FW	IRN	Mehrdad Oladi (Released)
16	DF	IRN	Alireza Ramezani (to Shahrdari Bandar Abbas)
27	FW	IRN	Arman Ramezani (to Fajr Sepasi)

=== Naft Tehran ===
In: Note: Flags indicate national team as defined under FIFA eligibility rules; some limited exceptions apply. Players may hold more than one non-FIFA nationality.

No.	Pos.	Nation	Player
88	FW	NED	Donovan Deekman (from (Romania) Concordia Chiajna)
16	MF	IRN	Abbas Bouazar (from Esteghlal Ahvaz)
41	FW	IRN	Yousef Arj (promoted from Naft Tehran U21)
42	DF	IRN	Ali Moghtadaei (promoted from Naft Tehran U21)
43	MF	IRN	Saeid Ghomi (promoted from Naft Tehran U21)
44	MF	IRN	Farid Mehdizadeh (promoted from Naft Tehran U21)
45	FW	IRN	Mohammad Pak Nahad (promoted from Naft Tehran U21)

Out: Note: Flags indicate national team as defined under FIFA eligibility rules; some limited exceptions apply. Players may hold more than one non-FIFA nationality.

No.	Pos.	Nation	Player
33	MF	IRN	Vahid Zolghadr (Released)
32	DF	IRN	Saeed Ghezelagchi (to Padideh)
66	MF	IRN	Morteza Pouraliganji (to (China) Tianjin Teda)

=== Naft Masjed Soleyman ===
In: Note: Flags indicate national team as defined under FIFA eligibility rules; some limited exceptions apply. Players may hold more than one non-FIFA nationality.

No.	Pos.	Nation	Player
22	GK	BUL	Georgi Georgiev (on loan from (Moldova) Sheriff Tiraspol)
29	MF	MDA	Alexandru Pașcenco (from (Moldova) Zimbru Chișinău)
26	MF	UZB	Ruslan Melziddinov (from (Uzbekistan) Neftchi Fargʻona)
31	MF	IRN	Bahram Ahmadi (from Saba Qom)
77	FW	IRN	Keivan Amraei (from Padideh)
12	DF	IRN	Bahman Maleki (from fajr Sepasi)

Out: Note: Flags indicate national team as defined under FIFA eligibility rules; some limited exceptions apply. Players may hold more than one non-FIFA nationality.

No.	Pos.	Nation	Player
5	DF	IRN	Esmaeil Ali Shirazi (to Sanat Naft)
6	DF	IRN	Ehsan Abdi (to Mes Kerman)
9	FW	IRN	Abbas Asgari (to Nirouye Zamini – Conscription)
23	DF	IRN	Milad Sheykh Soleimani (Conscription)
25	FW	IRN	Milad Soleiman Fallah (to Esteghlal)

=== Padideh ===
In: Note: Flags indicate national team as defined under FIFA eligibility rules; some limited exceptions apply. Players may hold more than one non-FIFA nationality.

No.	Pos.	Nation	Player
87	FW	UZB	Bahodir Nasimov (from Free agent)
65	FW	IRN	Hassan Zarei (promoted from Padideh U16)
40	FW	IRN	Mehdi Nazari (from Gostaresh Foolad)
6	FW	IRN	Mohammad Gholami (from Rah Ahan)
8	MF	IRN	Reza Haghighi (from Persepolis)
28	DF	IRN	Saeed Ghezelagchi (from Naft Tehran)
70	DF	IRN	Mohammad Salsali (from Gitipasand)
55	DF	IRN	Mohammad Hassan Rajabzadeh (from Free agent)
63	DF	IRN	Mohammad Ali Faramarzi (from Fajr Sepasi)

Out: Note: Flags indicate national team as defined under FIFA eligibility rules; some limited exceptions apply. Players may hold more than one non-FIFA nationality.

No.	Pos.	Nation	Player
7	FW	IRN	Keivan Amraei (to Naft Masjed Soleyman)
25	MF	IRN	Abdollah Mombeyni (to Naft Gachsaran)
17	FW	IRN	Rouhollah Bagheri (to Mes Kerman)
20	DF	IRN	Vahid Asgari (Released)
77	MF	IRN	Abbas Mohammadrezaei (to Rah Ahan)
10	FW	IRN	Reza Enayati (to Esteghlal)
37	MF	IRN	Hossein Zamehran (to Siah Jamegan)
30	MF	IRN	Ahmad Eskandari (Released)

=== Paykan ===
In: Note: Flags indicate national team as defined under FIFA eligibility rules; some limited exceptions apply. Players may hold more than one non-FIFA nationality.

No.	Pos.	Nation	Player
4	FW	IRN	Siavash Akbarpour (from Free agent)
6	MF	IRN	Ahmad Jamshidian (from Free agent)
17	FW	IRN	Mostafa Shojaei (from Zob Ahan)
—	MF	BRA	Dodó (from (Brazil) Ponte Preta)
22	DF	IRN	Ahmad Mehdizadeh (from Saba Qom)
14	MF	UZB	Oybek Kilichev (from (Uzbekistan) Pakhtakor Tashkent)
34	FW	IRN	Shahriar Moghanlou (promoted from Paykan U21)
36	MF	IRN	Mehdi Mohammadzadeh (promoted from Paykan U21)
37	DF	IRN	Erfan Ravasha (promoted from Paykan U21)
38	FW	IRN	Erfan Pourafzar (from Shahrdari Roudehen)

Out: Note: Flags indicate national team as defined under FIFA eligibility rules; some limited exceptions apply. Players may hold more than one non-FIFA nationality.

No.	Pos.	Nation	Player
—	FW	IRN	Saeid Hallafi (to Nirouye Zamini – Conscription)
8	MF	IRN	Majid Khodabandelou (to Sanat Naft)
11	FW	IRN	Jahangir Asgari (to Sanat Naft)
99	DF	IRN	Alireza Mohammad (to Khoneh Be Khoneh)
9	MF	IRN	Milad Nouri (to Esteghlal)
32	FW	CRO	Mate Eterović (to (Slovenia) Domžale)
12	GK	IRN	Masoud Homami (to Persepolis)
21	FW	IRN	Keyvan Vahdani (Released)

=== Persepolis ===
In: Note: Flags indicate national team as defined under FIFA eligibility rules; some limited exceptions apply. Players may hold more than one non-FIFA nationality.

No.	Pos.	Nation	Player
23	FW	IRN	Shahab Zahedi (promoted from Persepolis U21)
5	DF	IRN	Mehdi Jafarpour (from Shahrdari Tabriz)
16	FW	IRN	Reza Khaleghifar (from Rah Ahan)
41	GK	IRN	Morteza Ghadimipour (promoted from Persepolis U21)
22	FW	BRA	Tadeu (from (Brazil) Náutico)
44	GK	IRN	Masoud Homami (from Paykan)
99	DF	IRN	Babak Hatami (from Saipa)
30	DF	IRN	Mobin Mir Doraghi (from Saipa)
77	FW	IRN	Ali Alipour (from Rah Ahan)
34	MF	IRN	Mohammad Rahmati (promoted from Persepolis U21)
35	FW	IRN	Amir Mohammad Madani (promoted from Persepolis U21)
66	MF	BRA	Fernando Gabriel (from (Azerbaijan) Khazar Lankaran)

Out: Note: Flags indicate national team as defined under FIFA eligibility rules; some limited exceptions apply. Players may hold more than one non-FIFA nationality.

No.	Pos.	Nation	Player
23	GK	IRN	Nader Safarzaei (Released)
21	MF	IRN	Ali Astani (Demoted to Academy)
13	DF	IRN	Hossein Mahini (to Malavan – Conscription)
9	MF	IRN	Reza Haghighi (to Padideh)
25	DF	IRN	Farshad Ghasemi (to Saipa)
40	GK	BRA	Nilson Correa Junior (Released)
12	DF	IRN	Meysam Hosseini (Released)

=== Rah Ahan ===
In: Note: Flags indicate national team as defined under FIFA eligibility rules; some limited exceptions apply. Players may hold more than one non-FIFA nationality.

No.	Pos.	Nation	Player
55	DF	EQG	Eduardo Ferreira (from Free agent)
15	DF	IRN	Navid Khosh Hava (from Free agent)
32	GK	IRN	Mohammadreza Khazaeifard (from Fajr Sepasi)
38	DF	IRN	Mohsen Mirabi (from Parseh tehran)
39	DF	IRN	Milad Akbari (from Free agent)
88	MF	IRN	Adel Kolahkaj (from Free agent)
77	MF	IRN	Abbas Mohammadrezaei (from Padideh)
13	DF	IRN	Shervin Razminia (from Free agent)
37		IRN	Vahid Javanmardi (from Free agent)
44	GK	IRN	Morteza Akhbari (promoted from Rah Ahan U21)
31	FW	IRN	Saman Rokhsan (from Saipa U21)
99	FW	UGA	Martin Kayongo-Mutumba (from (Turkey) Orduspor)

Out: Note: Flags indicate national team as defined under FIFA eligibility rules; some limited exceptions apply. Players may hold more than one non-FIFA nationality.

No.	Pos.	Nation	Player
7	MF	IRN	Mohammad Soleiman Alizadeh (to Mes Kerman)
25	DF	IRN	Hamed Zamani (to Niroo Zamini – Conscription)
6	DF	IRN	Hamed Noormohammadi (Conscription)
9	FW	IRN	Reza Khaleghifar (to Persepolis)
55	DF	EQG	Eduardo Ferreira (Released)
12	MF	IRN	Mehdi Mehdipour (to Zob Ahan)
20	MF	IRN	Mohammad Abshak (to Malavan)
1	GK	IRN	Vahid Taleblou (to Esteghlal)
8	FW	IRN	Mohammad Gholami (to Padideh)
16	FW	IRN	Ali Alipour (to Persepolis)
18	FW	IRN	Behnam Barzay (to Esteghlal)

=== Saba Qom ===
In: Note: Flags indicate national team as defined under FIFA eligibility rules; some limited exceptions apply. Players may hold more than one non-FIFA nationality.

No.	Pos.	Nation	Player
55	DF	IRN	Saeid Mehdipour (from Shahrdari Tabriz)
44	FW	IRN	Mohammad Heidari (from Free agent)
19	FW	GEO	Ioseb Chakhvashvili (from (Georgia (country)) Norchi Dinamoeli)
23	FW	IRN	Javad Kazemian (from Free agent)
30	FW	IRN	Mohammad Ousani (from Esteghlal Khuzestan)
88	FW	IRN	Ghasem Akbari (from Sanat Naft)
25	DF	IRN	Hossein Koushki (from Sanat Naft)

Out: Note: Flags indicate national team as defined under FIFA eligibility rules; some limited exceptions apply. Players may hold more than one non-FIFA nationality.

No.	Pos.	Nation	Player
—	MF	IRN	Mohammad Hossein Ghodrati (Released)
16	FW	BRA	Marquinho (to (Brazil) Cabofriense)
70	FW	IRN	Ahmad Hassanzadeh (Conscription)
14	FW	IRN	Ghasem Gerami (to Mes Rafsanjan)
99	FW	IRN	Abbas Ghadian (Released)
3	DF	IRN	Ahmad Mehdizadeh (to Paykan)
77	MF	IRN	Bahram Ahmadi (to Naft Masjed Soleyman)
8	DF	IRN	Mohsen Bayat (to Esteghlal Khuzestan)
66	DF	IRN	Mohammad Borjlou (to PAS Hamedan)

=== Saipa ===
In: Note: Flags indicate national team as defined under FIFA eligibility rules; some limited exceptions apply. Players may hold more than one non-FIFA nationality.

No.	Pos.	Nation	Player
36	DF	IRN	Farshad Ghasemi (from Persepolis)
2	DF	IRN	Hadi Rekabi (from Naft Gachsaran)
34	DF	IRN	Ali Shojaei (promoted from Saipa U19)
37	FW	IRN	Bagher Niari (promoted from Saipa U21)

Out: Note: Flags indicate national team as defined under FIFA eligibility rules; some limited exceptions apply. Players may hold more than one non-FIFA nationality.

No.	Pos.	Nation	Player
23	FW	IRN	Mehdi Seyed Salehi (to Esteghlal Khuzestan)
11	FW	IRN	Milad Kermani (to Esteghlal)
9	FW	IRN	Kaveh Rezaei (to Zob Ahan)
40	DF	IRN	Babak Hatami (to Persepolis)
6	DF	IRN	Mobin Mir Doraghi (to Persepolis)

=== Sepahan ===
In: Note: Flags indicate national team as defined under FIFA eligibility rules; some limited exceptions apply. Players may hold more than one non-FIFA nationality.

No.	Pos.	Nation	Player
15	MF	BRA	Márcio Passos (from (Brazil) América de Natal)
88	MF	UZB	Fozil Musaev (from (Uzbekistan) Lokomotiv Tashkent)

Out: Note: Flags indicate national team as defined under FIFA eligibility rules; some limited exceptions apply. Players may hold more than one non-FIFA nationality.

No.	Pos.	Nation	Player
3	DF	IRN	Shoja' Khalilzadeh (to Tractor Sazi – Conscription)
40	DF	IRN	Ali Hamoudi (to Tractor Sazi – Conscription)

=== Tractor Sazi ===
In: Note: Flags indicate national team as defined under FIFA eligibility rules; some limited exceptions apply. Players may hold more than one non-FIFA nationality.

No.	Pos.	Nation	Player
—	MF	IRN	Sina Ashouri (from Zob Ahan – Conscription)
—	DF	IRN	Ali Hamoudi (from Sepahan – Conscription)
—	DF	IRN	Shoja' Khalilzadeh (from Sepahan – Conscription)
19	FW	IRN	Mehrdad Bayrami (from Gostaresh Foulad)
44	GK	SEN	Issa Ndoye (from Free agent)
16	MF	BRA	Radamés (from (Brazil) Vila Nova)
69	DF	IRN	Mehdi Qoreyshi (from Gostaresh Foulad)
14	MF	IRN	Andranik Teymourian (from Esteghlal)
88	DF	IRN	Fardin Abedini (from Mes Kerman)
13	DF	BRA	Célio (from Free agent)
45	GK	IRN	Milad Ghamari (from Be'sat Kermanshah)
25	DF	IRN	Reza Faraji (promoted from Academy)

Out: Note: Flags indicate national team as defined under FIFA eligibility rules; some limited exceptions apply. Players may hold more than one non-FIFA nationality.

No.	Pos.	Nation	Player
17	MF	IRQ	Alaa Abdul-Zahra (to (Iraq) Al-Shorta)
11	FW	IRN	Mohammad Ebrahimi (to Gostaresh Foulad)
5	DF	IRN	Ahmad Alenemeh (to Foolad)
15	DF	ALB	Ditmar Bicaj (to (Albania) Flamurtari Vlorë)
22	GK	IRN	Davoud Noushi Soufiani (to Gostaresh Foulad)
31	MF	IRN	Ebrahim Abednezhad (to Shahrdari Tabriz)
16	MF	BRA	Radamés (to (Brazil) Paysandu)

=== Zob Ahan ===
In: Note: Flags indicate national team as defined under FIFA eligibility rules; some limited exceptions apply. Players may hold more than one non-FIFA nationality.

No.	Pos.	Nation	Player
28	FW	IRN	Ali Khodadadi (promoted from Zob Ahan U19)
33	GK	IRN	Mohammad Amin Bahrami (promoted from Zob Ahan U19)
27	DF	LBN	Walid Ismail (from (Lebanon) Nejmeh)
26	MF	IRN	Mehdi Mehdipour (from Rah Ahan)
99	FW	IRN	Kaveh Rezaei (from Saipa)

Out: Note: Flags indicate national team as defined under FIFA eligibility rules; some limited exceptions apply. Players may hold more than one non-FIFA nationality.

No.	Pos.	Nation	Player
6	MF	IRN	Sina Ashouri (to Tractor Sazi – Conscription)
9	FW	IRN	Mostafa Shojaei (to Paykan)
7	MF	IRN	Mohsen Mosalman (on loan at Foolad)
24	MF	IRN	Hossein Doustdar (to Gitipasand)
37	MF	IRN	Farid Mokhtari (to Shahrdari Bandar Abbas)
