= 2012–13 Fajr Sepasi F.C. season =

Fajr Sepasi
2012–13 season
- Chairman: Gheyb Parvar
- Manager: Mahmoud Yavari
- Stadium: Hafezieh Stadium
- Iran Pro League: 11th
- Hazfi Cup: Quarter-final
- Top goalscorer: League: Jaber Ansari (8); All: Jaber Ansari (8)
- Highest home attendance: 20,000 Esteghlal F.C.-Fajr Sepasi F.C.
- Lowest home attendance: 3,000 Peykan F.C.-Fajr Sepasi F.C.
- Average home league attendance: 6,000
Home colours	Away colours

The 2012–13 season are the Fajr Sepasi's 11th season in the Pro League, and their 2nd consecutive season in the top division of Iranian football and 25th year in existence as a football club. They also competed in the Hazfi Cup where they were eliminated in the quarter-finals by Damash. Fajr Sepasi was captained by Reza Haghighi until December 2012 and Mohammad Mehdi Nazari from then.

== Player ==
=== First-team squad ===
Note: Flags indicate national team as defined under FIFA eligibility rules; some limited exceptions apply. Players may hold more than one non-FIFA nationality.

No.	Pos.	Nation	Player
1	GK	(Iran) IRN	Vahid Sheikhveisi
2	DF	(Iran) IRN	Omid Khalili
3	DF	(Iran) IRN	Khaled Shafiei
4	MF	(Iran) IRN	Alireza Jalili
5	DF	(Iran) IRN	Saeed Ghezelagchi
6	MF	(Iran) IRN	Hadi Imani
8	FW	(Iran) IRN	Ali Molaei
10	FW	(Iran) IRN	Mehdi Nazari
11	MF	(Iran) IRN	Mohammad Afand
12	FW	(Iran) IRN	Babak Latifi
13	MF	(Iran) IRN	Hamid Jokar
14	MF	(Iran) IRN	Masoud Rigi
16	MF	(Iran) IRN	Ali Reza Latifi
17	MF	(Iran) IRN	Jalaleddin Ali Mohammadi

No.	Pos.	Nation	Player
19	FW	(Iran) IRN	Amin Shojaeian
20	MF	(Iran) IRN	Farshid Esmaeili
21	FW	(Iran) IRN	Mohammad Reza Hosseini
22	DF	(Iran) IRN	Hossein Karimi
23	GK	(Iran) IRN	Mohammad Saleh Khalil Azad
24	MF	(Iran) IRN	Jaber Ansari
27	MF	(Iran) IRN	Hadi Daghagheleh
28	MF	(Iran) IRN	Abdolreza Zarei
30	GK	(Iran) IRN	Mohammad Khazaei
32	MF	(Iran) IRN	Mohammad Reza Jalali
33	MF	(Iran) IRN	Mojtaba Tarshiz
40	MF	(Iran) IRN	Hossein Khosravi
—	FW	(Netherlands) NED	Sendley Sidney Bito

For recent transfers, see List of Iranian football transfers winter 2012–13.

== Transfers ==
Confirmed transfers 2012–13

=== Summer ===
In: Note: Flags indicate national team as defined under FIFA eligibility rules; some limited exceptions apply. Players may hold more than one non-FIFA nationality.

No.	Pos.	Nation	Player
—	MF	(Iran) IRN	Farshid Esmaeili (from Iran U-20)
—	MF	(Iran) IRN	Hadi Daghagheleh (from Aluminium Hormozgan F.C.)
—	DF	(Brazil) BRA	Diego Benedito Galvão Máximo (from Iranjavan)
—	MF	(Iran) IRN	Mohammad Reza Jalali (from Gahar Zagros)
—	MF	(Iran) IRN	Jalaleddin Alimohammadi (from Gostaresh Foolad)
—	DF	(Iran) IRN	Mojtaba Tarshiz (from Mes Sarcheshmeh)
—	GK	(Iran) IRN	Mohammad Khazaei (from Mes Sarcheshmeh)
—	FW	(Iran) IRN	Abbas Mohammad Rezaei (from Saipa)
—	DF	(Iran) IRN	Jaber Ansari (from Saipa)
—	FW	(Iran) IRN	Ali Molaei (from Saba Qom)
—	FW	(Iran) IRN	Babak Latifi (from Shahin)
—	MF	(Iran) IRN	Ali Reza Latifi (to Saipa)

Out: Note: Flags indicate national team as defined under FIFA eligibility rules; some limited exceptions apply. Players may hold more than one non-FIFA nationality.

No.	Pos.	Nation	Player
30	MF	(Iran) IRN	Mehdi Rajabzadeh (to Zob Ahan)
8	MF	(Iran) IRN	Mehrdad Karimian (released, to Mes Kerman F.C.)
1	GK	(Iran) IRN	Sirous Sangchouli (released)
22	FW	(Iran) IRN	Younes Shakeri (to Aboomoslem)
20	DF	(Iran) IRN	Ayoub Kalantari (released)
23	MF	(Iran) IRN	Javad Zayghami (released)
27	MF	(Iran) IRN	Vahid Nemati (released)
7	MF	(Iran) IRN	Mohammed Reza Pourmohammad (released)
17	DF	(Iran) IRN	Abbas Kazemian (released)

=== Winter ===
In: Note: Flags indicate national team as defined under FIFA eligibility rules; some limited exceptions apply. Players may hold more than one non-FIFA nationality.

No.	Pos.	Nation	Player
—	DF	(Iran) IRN	Mohammad Ansari (from Esteghlal)
—	FW	(Iran) IRN	Moslem Firouz Abadi (from Mes Sarcheshmeh)
—	FW	(Iran) IRN	Hossein Fazeli (from Sepahan U23)
—	MF	(Iran) IRN	Hossein Kazemi (from Mes Kerman)
—	DF	(Iran) IRN	Mohammad Faramarzi (from Saipa U23)
—	FW	(Netherlands) NED	Sendley Sidney Bito (from (Ukraine) Arsenal Kyiv)

Out: Note: Flags indicate national team as defined under FIFA eligibility rules; some limited exceptions apply. Players may hold more than one non-FIFA nationality.

No.	Pos.	Nation	Player
9	MF	(Iran) IRN	Reza Haghighi (to Persepolis)
7	MF	(Iran) IRN	Abbas Mohammad Rezaei (On loan to Esteghlal)
25	DF	(Brazil) BRA	Diego Máximo (to Paykan)
12	FW	(Iran) IRN	Babak Latifi (to Saipa)
32	MF	(Iran) IRN	Mohammad Reza Jalali (Released)
40	MF	(Iran) IRN	Hossein Khosravi (Released)
27	MF	(Iran) IRN	Hadi Daghagheleh (Released)
8	FW	(Iran) IRN	Ali Molaei (Released)
16	MF	(Iran) IRN	Ali Reza Latifi (Released)

== Competitions ==
=== Overview ===
Competition	Started round	Current position / round	Final position / round	First match	Last match
2012–13 Iran Pro League	—	8th		20 July 2012	
2012–13 Hazfi Cup	Round of 32	—	Quarter-Final	14 December 2012	9 January 2013

Updated to match played 1 January 2013
Source: Competitions

=== Iran Pro League ===
==== Standings ====
Pos	Team	Pld	W	D	L	GF	GA	GD	Pts	Qualification or relegation
10	Saipa	34	11	12	11	37	33	+4	45	
11	Damash	34	11	10	13	36	47	−11	43	
12	Fajr Sepasi	34	10	12	12	42	38	+4	42	
13	Malavan	34	9	13	12	34	39	−5	40	
14	Zob Ahan (O)	34	9	11	14	36	40	−4	38	Qualification to relegation play-offs

Updated to match(es) played on 10 May 2013. Source: IPL stats.com
Rules for classification: 1) points; 2) goal difference; 3) number of goals scored.
(O) Play-off winners

==== Results summary ====
Overall								Home						Away					
Pld	W	D	L	GF	GA	GD	Pts	W	D	L	GF	GA	GD	W	D	L	GF	GA	GD
24	8	9	7	28	19	+9	33	6	5	1	16	5	+11	2	4	6	12	14	−2

Last updated: 13 January 2013.
Source: Ipl Stats

== Matches summary ==
=== Pro League matches ===
Win Draw Loss

IPL season 2012–13

Date	Venue	Opponent	Result	scorers
19 July 2012	Shiraz, Iran	Zob Ahan F.C.	3–0	10' Mehdi Nazari, 32' Babak Latifi, 90+2' Hamid Reza Jokar
24 July 2012	Tehran, Iran	Perspolis F.C.	3–2	52' Abbas Mohammad Rezaei, 76' (pen.) Reza Haghighi, 90+1' Mehdi Nazari
31 July 2012	Shiraz, Iran	Sanat NafSanat Naft Abadan F.C.	2–0	77' Mohammad Reza Hosseini, 82' Mehdi Nazari
6 August 2012	Bandar-e Anzali, Iran	Malavan F.C.	0–1	
17 August 2012	Qom, Iran	Saba Qom F.C.	1–1	65' Mohammad Reza Hosseini
24 August 2012	Shiraz, Iran	Gahar Zagros F.C.	0–0	
29 August 2012	Isfahan, Iran	Sepahan F.C.	0–1	
15 September 2012	Shiraz, Iran	Damash Gilan F.C.	6–1	12' Jaber Ansari, 19' Jaber Ansari, 28' Abbas Mohammad Rezaei, 45' Mehdi Nazari, 58' Mohammad Reza Hosseini, 76' Jaber Ansari
21 September 2012	Tehran, Iran	Esteghlal F.C.	0–0	
26 September 2012	Shiraz, Iran	Tractor Sazi F.C.	1–0	60' Babak Latifi
1 October 2012	Bandar Abbas, Iran	Aluminium Hormozgan F.C.	3–3	23' Mojtaba Tarshiz, 51' Hossein Khosravi, 75' Mojtaba Tarshiz
18 October 2012	Shiraz, Iran	Naft Tehran F.C.	0-0	
24 October 2012	Ahvaz, Iran.	Foolad F.C.	2–1	80' Mojtaba Tarshiz
31 October 2012	Shiraz, Iran	Saipa F.C.	1–0	91' Abbas Mohammad Rezaei
17 November 2012	Shiraz, Iran	Mes Kerman F.C.	0–1	
3 December 2012	Shiraz, Iran	Paykan F.C.	0-0	
27 November 2012	Tehran, Iran	Rah Ahan F.C.	0–1	
25 December 2012	Isfahan, Iran	Zob Ahan F.C.	0–1	
30 December 2012	Shiraz, Iran	Perspolis F.C.	0–2	
4 January 2013	Abadan, Iran	Sanat Naft Abadan F.C.	1–1	52' Jaber Ansari
13 January 2013	Shiraz, Iran	Malavan F.C.	2–1	13' Jaber Ansari, 88' Tarshiz
17 January 2013	Qom, Iran	Saba Qom F.C.	1–1	30' Jaber Ansari
24 January 2013	Shiraz, Iran	Gahar Zagros F.C.	3–0	4' Moslem Firoozabadi, 34' Tarshiz, 83'(pen) Saeed Ghezelagchi
29 January 2013	Isfahan, Iran	Sepahan F.C.	0–0	
9 February 2013	Shiraz, Iran	Damash Gilan F.C.	0–1	
15 February 2013	Tehran, Iran	Esteghlal F.C.	0–5	
21 February 2013	Shiraz, Iran	Tractor Sazi F.C.	1–3	
2 March 2013	Bandar Abbas, Iran	Aluminium Hormozgan F.C.	6–0	45+2' Mohammad Mehdi Nazari, 55' Farshid Esmaili, 65' Jaber Ansari, 81' Mohammad Mehdi Nazari, 83' Farshid Esmaili, 90+3' Jaber Ansari
7 March 2013	Shiraz, Iran	Naft Tehran F.C.		
15 March 2013	Ahvaz, Iran	Foolad F.C.		
28 March 2013	Shiraz, Iran	Saipa F.C.		
13 April 2013	Shiraz, Iran	Mes Kerman F.C.		
5 May 2013	Tehran, Iran	Paykan F.C.		
5 May 2013	Shiraz, Iran	Rah Ahan F.C.		

=== Hazfi Cup matches ===
Win Draw Loss

Round of 32

Round	Venue	Opponent	Result	scorers
Round of 32	Shiraz, Iran	Sang Ahan Bafq	3–0	(W/O)
Round of 16	Shiraz, Iran	Saipa Shomal	4 PK 3	11' Mohammad Mehdi Nazari
Quarter Finals	Shiraz, Iran	Damash Gilan	4 PK 5	

== Top scorers ==
Includes all competitive matches. The list is sorted by shirt number when total goals are equal.

Updated on 31 January 2013

Ran	No.	Pos	Nat	Name	Pro League	Hazfi Cup	Total
1	24	MF	(Iran)	Jaber Ansari	8	0	8
2	10	FW	(Iran)	Mehdi Nazari	6	1	7
3	33	MF	(Iran)	Mojtaba Tarshiz	5	0	5
4	21	FW	(Iran)	Mohammad Reza Hosseini	3	0	3
5	12	FW	(Iran)	Babak Latifi	2	0	2
TOTALS					24	1	25

Friendlies and Pre season goals are not recognized as competitive match goals.

== Coaching staff ==
Position	Staff
Head coach	(Iran) Mahmoud Yavari
Assistant coach	(Iran) Dariush Sabouri

== See also ==
- 2012–13 Iran Pro League
- 2012–13 Hazfi Cup
