= 2011–12 Tractor Sazi F.C. season =

Tractor Sazi
2011–12 season
- Chairman: Mohammad Hossein Jafari
- Manager: Amir Ghalenoei
- Stadium: Yadegar-e-Emam Stadium (66,883)
- IPL: 2nd
- Hazfi Cup: Round of 32
- Highest home attendance: 80,000 v Esteghlal (stadium overfilled)
- Lowest home attendance: 10,000 v Damash
- Average home league attendance: 39,553
Home colours	Away colours

The 2011–12 season was the Tractor Sazi Football Club's 4th season in the Iran Pro League, their 3rd consecutive season in the top division of Iranian football, and their 41st year in existence as a football club. They also competed in the Hazfi Cup, where they were eliminated in the Round of 32 by Shahrdari Yasuj.

== Players ==
=== First-team squad ===
As of 31 January 2012.

Out for Injuries	Released – Retired

No.	Name	Nationality	Position (s)	Date of birth (age)	Signed from
Goalkeepers
40	Agil Etemadi	(Iran)	GK	April 23, 1987 (aged 25)	(Iran) Groningen
12	Mehdi Sabeti	(Iran)	GK	February 1, 1975 (aged 36)	(Iran) Aboumoslem
31	Hojat Nourollahi	(Iran)	GK		(Iran) ?
1	Mohsen Forouzan	(Iran)	GK	3 May 1988 (age 38)	(Iran) Gostaresh Foolad
Defenders
8	Morteza Asadi	(Iran)	DF	February 24, 1979 (aged 32)	(Iran) Saba Qom
16	Mostafa Ekrami	(Iran)	DF	June 21, 1983 (aged 28)	(Iran) Esteghlal Ahvaz
14	Mohsen Hosseini	(Iran)	DF		
28	Ehsan Hajsafi	(Iran)	LB, LM	February 25, 1991 (aged 20)	(Iran) Sepahan
3	Fardin Abedini	(Iran)	RB, RM	November 18, 1991 (aged 19)	(Iran) Esteghlal
4	Ahmad Alenemeh	(Iran)	DF	October 20, 1982 (aged 28)	(Iran) Shahin Bushehr
Midfielders
6	Mehdi Kiani	(Iran)	MF	January 10, 1987 (aged 24)	(Iran) Saba Battery
7	Farzad Ashoubi	(Iran)	MF	April 6, 1974 (aged 37)	(Iran) Esteghlal
18	Mostafa Haghipour	(Iran)	MF	May 21, 1982 (aged 29)	(Iran) Damash Gilan
19	Davoud Daneshdoost	(Iran)	MF	August 6, 1985 (aged 25)	(Iran) Aboumoslem
23	Meysam Maniei	(Iran)	LB, LM	July 24, 1982 (aged 28)	(Iran) Mes
24	Mohammad Lotfi	(Iran)	MF		
	Ali Molaei	(Iran)	MF	June 19, 1984 (aged 27)	(Iran) Sepahan
Forwards
17	Flávio Paixão	(Portugal)	ST	September 19, 1984 (aged 26)	(Scotland) Hamilton Academical
11	Mohammad Ebrahimi	(Iran)	ST	November 1, 1984 (aged 26)	(Iran) Mokhaberat
22	Masoud Ebrahimzadeh	(Iran)	ST	January 16, 1989 (aged 22)	(Youth system)

=== Iran Pro League squad ===
As of May 2011.

Note: Flags indicate national team as defined under FIFA eligibility rules; some limited exceptions apply. Players may hold more than one non-FIFA nationality.

No.	Pos.	Nation	Player
1	GK	IRI	Agil Etemadi
2	DF	IRI	Amir Hossein Sadeghi
3	DF	IRI	Fardin Abedini
4	DF	IRI	Ahmad Alenemeh
6	MF	IRI	Mehdi Kiani
7	MF	IRI	Farzad Ashoubi
8	DF	IRI	Morteza Assadi (captain)
9	FW	IRI	Ali Alizadeh
10	FW	IRI	Siavash Akbarpour
11	FW	IRI	Mohammad Ebrahimi
12	GK	IRI	Mehdi Sabeti
14	DF	IRI	Mohsen Hosseini
16	DF	IRI	Mostafa Ekrami

No.	Pos.	Nation	Player
17	FW	POR	Flávio Paixão
18	MF	IRI	Mohsen Delvari
19	MF	IRI	Davoud Daneshdoost
20	MF	BRA	Rodrigo Tosi
21	MF	IRI	Siamak Sarlak
22	FW	IRI	Masoud Ebrahimzadeh
23	MF	IRI	Ghasem Haddadifar
24	FW	IRI	Farzad Hatami
27	MF	IRI	Bahram Dabbagh
28	MF	IRI	Ehsan Hajsafi
33	GK	IRI	Mohsen Foroozan
34	MF	IRI	Milad Fakhreddini

For recent transfers, see List of Iranian football transfers winter 2011–12.

== Transfers ==
Confirmed transfers 2011–12

=== Summer ===
In: Note: Flags indicate national team as defined under FIFA eligibility rules; some limited exceptions apply. Players may hold more than one non-FIFA nationality.

No.	Pos.	Nation	Player
10	FW	IRI	Siavash Akbarpour (from Steel Azin)
—	MF	IRI	Ali Molaei (from Gostaresh Foolad, Loan Return)
—	MF	IRI	Ehsan Hajysafi (from Sepahan)
—	DF	IRI	Ahmad Alenemeh (from Shahin)

Out: Note: Flags indicate national team as defined under FIFA eligibility rules; some limited exceptions apply. Players may hold more than one non-FIFA nationality.

No.	Pos.	Nation	Player
10	FW	IRI	Rasoul Khatibi (to Gostaresh Foolad), Loan Return
13	MF	IRQ	Karrar Jassim (to Esteghlal)
20	DF	IRI	Mohammad Nosrati (to Esteghlal)
11	FW	BRA	Leonardo Pimenta (Released)
3	DF	IRI	Mojtaba Torshizi (to Mes Sarcheshmeh)

=== Winter ===
In: Note: Flags indicate national team as defined under FIFA eligibility rules; some limited exceptions apply. Players may hold more than one non-FIFA nationality.

No.	Pos.	Nation	Player
15	MF	IRI	Ghasem Haddadifar (from Zob Ahan)
23	MF	IRI	Milad Fakhreddini (from Mes Kerman)
1	GK	IRI	Agil Etemadi (from (Netherlands) Groningen)
32	FW	IRI	Farzad Hatami (from Sepahan)
—	MF	IRI	Siamak Sarlak (from Damash Gilan)

Out: Note: Flags indicate national team as defined under FIFA eligibility rules; some limited exceptions apply. Players may hold more than one non-FIFA nationality.

No.	Pos.	Nation	Player
1	GK	IRI	Abbas Mohammadi (to Sanat Naft Abadan)
5	FW	GER	Shpejtim Arifi (to Aboumoslem)

== Competitions ==
Competition	Started round	Current position / round	Final position / round	First match	Last match
2011–12 Persian Gulf Cup	—	—	2nd	3 August 2011	11 May 2012
2011–12 Hazfi Cup	Round of 32	—	Round of 32	26 October 2011	26 October 2011

Updated to match played 27 April 2012
Source: Competitions

=== Iran Pro League ===
==== Standings ====
Pos	Team	Pld	W	D	L	GF	GA	GD	Pts	Qualification or relegation
1	Sepahan (C)	34	19	10	5	54	27	+27	67	Qualification for the 2013 AFC Champions League group stage
2	Tractor Sazi	34	19	9	6	57	32	+25	66	Qualification for the 2013 AFC Champions League group stage
3	Esteghlal	34	19	9	6	58	34	+24	66	Qualification for the 2013 AFC Champions League group stage
4	Saba Qom	34	12	14	8	40	38	+2	50	Qualification for the 2013 AFC Champions League qualifying play-off
5	Naft Tehran	34	13	10	11	36	38	−2	49	

Updated to match(es) played on 11 May 2012. Source: varzesh3.com
Rules for classification: 1) points; 2) goal difference; 3) number of goals scored.
(C) Champions

==== Results summary ====
Overall								Home						Away					
Pld	W	D	L	GF	GA	GD	Pts	W	D	L	GF	GA	GD	W	D	L	GF	GA	GD
33	18	9	6	57	34	+23	63	9	5	3	31	18	+13	9	4	3	26	16	+10

Last updated: 6 May 2012.
Source: Ipl Stats

==== Results by round ====
Round	1	2	3	4	5	6	7	8	9	10	11	12	13	14	15	16	17	18	19	20	21	22	23	24	25	26	27	28	29	30	31	32	33	34
Ground	H	A	H	A	H	A	H	A	H	A	H	A	A	H	A	H	A	A	H	A	H	A	H	A	H	A	H	A	H	H	A	H	A	H
Result	L	W	W	W	W	W	L	D	W	L	D	W	L	D	W	D	D	D	W	W	W	W	L	D	W	L	W	W	D	W	W	W	D	W
Position	17	7	4	3	2	1	3	4	1	3	4	4	4	5	2	3	4	4	3	2	2	2	3	3	3	3	2	2	3	3	3	2	2	2

Updated to match(es) played on 6 May 2012. Source: "Ipl".
A = Away; H = Home; W = Win; D = Draw; L = Loss

==== Matches ====
Win Draw Loss

2 August 2011 1	Tractor Sazi	2–3	Saba Qom	Tabriz
22:00	Sadeghi 22' (o.g.); Ebrahimi 31' (pen.); Ashoubi 64'	Summary	Bayat 45'; Enayati 78' (pen.)	Stadium: Yadegar-e Emam Stadium; Attendance: NC; Referee: Hedayat Mombeni

7 August 2011 2	Zob Ahan	0–1	Tractor Sazi	Fuladshahr
22:00		Summary	Arifi 37'	Stadium: Foolad Shahr Stadium; Attendance: 5,000; Referee: Mahmoud Rafiei

11 August 2011 3	Tractor Sazi	1–0	Shahin Bushehr	Tabriz
22:00	Ebrahimi 28' (pen.)	Summary	Talebloo (red card) 76'	Stadium: Yadegar-e Emam Stadium; Attendance: NC; Referee: Reza Kermanshahi

17 August 2011 4	Damash Gilan	2–3	Tractor Sazi	Rasht
22:00	Asgari 1'; Abshak 34'	Summary	Mohsen Hosseini 19', 80'; Ebrahimi 83' (pen.)	Stadium: Shahid Dr. Azodi Stadium; Attendance: 15,000; Referee: Saeid Mozaffarizadeh

25 August 2011 5	Tractor Sazi	5–1	Shahrdari Tabriz	Tabriz
18:30	Hajsafi 3', 59'; Sadeghi 8'; Fardin Aabedini 11'; Akbarpour 20'	Summary	Daghighi 35'	Stadium: Yadegar-e Emam Stadium; Attendance: 55,000; Referee: Alireza Faghani

9 September 2011 6	Esteghlal	2–3	Tractor Sazi	Tehran
15:15	Majidi 18'; Jabbari 67'	Summary	Mohsen Hosseini 42'; Alenemeh 45+2'; Flávio Paixão 83'	Stadium: Azadi Stadium; Attendance: 85,000; Referee: Mohsen Torki

15 September 2011 7	Tractor Sazi	1–2	Naft Tehran	Tabriz
15:20	Mohsen Hosseini 90'	Summary	Mousavi 52'; Alireza Ezzati 84'	Stadium: Yadegar-e Emam Stadium; Attendance: 50,000; Referee: Ahmad Salehi

25 September 2011 8	Sanat Naft	3–3	Tractor Sazi	Abadan
16:15	Founéké Sy 15', 37'; Pachajyan 32' (pen.)	Summary	Mohsen Hosseini 2', 60'; Akbarpour 40'	Stadium: Takhti Stadium (Abadan); Attendance: 20,000; Referee: Gholamreza Jabbari

30 September 2011 9	Tractor Sazi	3–1	Mes Kerman	Tabriz
15:15	Alizadeh 17'; Rodrigo 22'; Flávio Paixão 45'	Summary	Hosseinkhani 28' (pen.)	Stadium: Yadegar-e Emam Stadium; Attendance: 30,000; Referee: Alireza Faghani

14 October 2011 10	Sepahan	2–1	Tractor Sazi	Isfahan
13:30	Emad Mohammed 5'; Ahmad Alenemeh 15' (o.g.)	Summary	Flávio Paixão 90'	Stadium: Naghsh-e-Jahan Stadium; Attendance: 5,000; Referee: Hedayat Mombeni

21 October 2011 11	Tractor Sazi	2–2	Saipa	Tabriz
13:30	Akbarpour 14'; Alizadeh 45'	Summary	Sadeghi 33'; Mohammadrezaei 54'	Stadium: Yadegar-e Emam Stadium; Attendance: 40,000; Referee: Saeid Mozaffarizadeh

29 October 2011 12	Fajr Sepasi	1–2	Tractor Sazi	Shiraz
13:30	Mohammad Mehdi Nazari 27'	Summary	Ebrahimi 45+3'; Rodrigo 67'	Stadium: Hafezieh Stadium; Attendance: 6,000; Referee: Alboroz Hajipour

18 November 2011 13	Foolad	2–1	Tractor Sazi	Ahvaz
13:15	Hakim Nasari 39', 70'	Summary	Hajsafi 49'	Stadium: Ghadir Stadium; Attendance: 10,000; Referee: Mohsen Ghahremani

24 November 2011 14	Tractor Sazi	1–1	Rah Ahan	Tabriz
11:20	Rodrigo 90'	Summary	Kazemi 41' (pen.)	Stadium: Yadegar-e Emam Stadium; Attendance: 13,000; Referee: Mohsen Torki

2 December 2011 15	Persepolis	0–1	Tractor Sazi	Tehran
11:30		Summary	Akbarpour 49'	Stadium: Azadi Stadium; Attendance: 30,000; Referee: Mahmoud Rafiei

9 December 2011 16	Tractor Sazi	0–0	Mes Sarcheshmeh	Tabriz
11:30		Summary		Stadium: Yadegar-e Emam Stadium; Attendance: 30,000; Referee: Saeid Mozaffarizadeh

16 December 2011 17	Malavan	0–0	Tractor Sazi	Bandar-e Anzali
11:30		Summary		Stadium: Takhti Stadium (Anzali); Attendance: 5,000; Referee: Yadollah Jahanbazi

6 January 2012 18	Saba Qom	2–2	Tractor Sazi	Qom
11:30	Enayati 82' (pen.) 85'	Summary	Mohsen Hosseini 49'; Haddadifar 89'; Rodrigo (red card) 90'	Stadium: Yadegar-e Emam Stadium; Attendance: 5,000; Referee: Mahmoud Rafiei

10 January 2012 19	Tractor Sazi	2–1	Zob Ahan	Tabriz
11:30	Sarlak 58'; Akbarpour 64'	Summary	Ghazi 25'	Stadium: Yadegar-e Emam Stadium; Attendance: 30,000; Referee: Mohsen Torki

15 January 2012 20	Shahin Bushehr	0–3	Tractor Sazi	Bushehr
11:30		Summary	Hatami 1'; Rodrigo 44', 72'	Stadium: Shahid Beheshti Stadium; Referee: Farshid Afshar

19 January 2012 21	Tractor Sazi	3–1	Damash Gilan	Tabriz
11:30	Hatami 34'; Rodrigo 45+3' (pen.); Flávio Paixão 82'	Summary	Gholami 31'	Stadium: Yadegar-e Emam Stadium; Attendance: 35,000; Referee: G.Jabbari

25 January 2012 22	Shahrdari Tabriz	0–1	Tractor Sazi	Tabriz
11:30		Summary	Hatami 39'	Stadium: Yadegar-e Emam Stadium; Attendance: 10,000; Referee: Alireza Faghani

29 January 2012 23	Tractor Sazi	0–2	Esteghlal	Tabriz
12:00	Hajsafi (red card) 41'	Summary	Jabbari 44' (pen.) 90+5' (pen.)	Stadium: Yadegar-e Emam Stadium; Attendance: 80,000; Referee: Mohsen Torki

3 February 2012 24	Naft Tehran	1–1	Tractor Sazi	Tehran
12:00	Ferreira 75'	Summary	Rodrigo 53'	Stadium: Naft Stadium; Attendance: 8,000; Referee: Saeid Mozaffarizadeh

8 February 2012 25	Tractor Sazi	4–1	Sanat Naft	Tabriz
12:00	Hajsafi 3', 21'; Flávio Paixão 33', 52'	Summary	Founéké Sy 80'	Stadium: Yadegar-e Emam Stadium; Attendance: 20,000; Referee: Alireza Faghani

15 February 2012 26	Mes Kerman	1–0	Tractor Sazi	Kerman
12:00	Amraei 23'	Summary		Stadium: Shahid Bahonar Stadium; Attendance: 2,500; Referee: Ahmad Salehi

12 March 2012 27	Tractor Sazi	1–0	Sepahan	Tabriz
11:45	Rodrigo 58' (pen.)	Summary		Stadium: Yadegar-e Emam Stadium; Attendance: 10,000; Referee: Saeid Mozaffarizadeh

17 March 2012 28	Saipa	0–1	Tractor Sazi	Karaj
12:30		Summary	Hatami 35'	Stadium: Enghelab Stadium; Referee: Turaj Haghverdi

6 April 2012 29	Tractor Sazi	0–0	Fajr Sepasi	Tabriz
13:30		Summary		Stadium: Yadegar-e Emam Stadium; Attendance: 80,000; Referee: Alireza Faghani

13 April 2012 30	Tractor Sazi	2–0	Foolad	Tabriz
13:30	Akbarpour 18'; Flávio Paixão 50'	Summary		Stadium: Yadegar-e Emam Stadium; Attendance: 30,000; Referee: Saeid Mozaffarizadeh

21 April 2012 31	Rah Ahan	0–1	Tractor Sazi	Tehran
17:00 UTC+03:30		Report	Akbarpour (yellow card); Flávio Paixão (yellow card); Sadeghi 86'	Stadium: Takhti Stadium; Attendance: 5,000; Referee: Hajipour

26 April 2012 32	Tractor Sazi	4–1	Persepolis	Tabriz
16:30 UTC+03:30	Flávio Paixão 51', 64'; Hatami 58'; Ebrahimi 66'	Summary	Noormohammadi 80'	Stadium: Yadegar-e Emam Stadium; Attendance: 50,000; Referee: Alireza Faghani

6 May 2012 33	Mes Sarcheshmeh	0–0	Tractor Sazi	Kerman
17:00 UTC+03:30		Summary		Stadium: Shahid Bahonar Stadium; Referee: Saeid Bakhshizadeh

11 May 2012 34	Tractor Sazi	2–0	Malavan	Tabriz
17:00 UTC+03:30	Lopes 3'; Ebrahimi 7'			Stadium: Yadegar-e Emam Stadium; Attendance: 40,000; Referee: Ali Zargar

=== Hazfi Cup ===
==== Matches ====
Win Draw Loss

===== Round of 32 =====
25 October 2011 1/32	Shahrdari Yasuj	0 (4)– 0 (3)	Tractor Sazi	Shiraz
17:00 UTC+03:30		Report		Stadium: Hafezieh Stadium; Attendance: 2,000; Referee: Torky

=== Friendly Matches ===
Win Draw Loss

18 July 2011	(Romania) Oţelul Galaţi	1–4	Tractor Sazi	Istanbul
14:00 UTC+03:30		Report		Stadium: Turk Telecom Stadium; Attendance: 200

== Statistics ==
=== Appearances ===
No.	Pos	Nat	Player	Total		Iran Pro League		AFC Champions League		Hazfi Cup	
No.	Pos	Nat	Player	Apps	Goals	Apps	Goals	Apps	Goals	Apps	Goals
1	GK	(Iran) IRI	Abbas Mohammadi	0	0	0+0	0	0+0	0	0+0	0
5	DF	(Mali) MLI	Alou Traoré	0	0	0+0	0	0+0	0	0+0	0
6	MF	(Iran) IRI	Mehdi Kiani	0	0	0+0	0	0+0	0	0+0	0
7	FW	(Iran) IRI	Alireza Jalili	0	0	0+0	0	0+0	0	0+0	0
8	DF	(Iran) IRI	Morteza Assadi	0	0	0+0	0	0+0	0	0+0	0
10	FW	(Iran) IRI	Rasoul Khatibi	0	0	0+0	0	0+0	0	0+0	0
11	FW	(Brazil) BRA	Leonardo André Pimenta Faria	0	0	0+0	0	0+0	0	0+0	0
12	GK	(Iran) IRI	Mehdi Sabeti	0	0	0+0	0	0+0	0	0+0	0
14	MF	(Iran) IRI	Andranik Teymourian	0	0	0+0	0	0+0	0	0+0	0
16	DF	(Iran) IRI	Mostafa Ekrami	0	0	0+0	0	0+0	0	0+0	0
17	FW	(Iran) IRI	Mohammad Ebrahimi	0	0	0+0	0	0+0	0	0+0	0
18	MF	(Iran) IRI	Mostafa Haghipour	0	0	0+0	0	0+0	0	0+0	0
19	MF	(Iran) IRI	Davoud Daneshdoost	0	0	0+0	0	0+0	0	0+0	0
21	FW	(Iran) IRI	Ali Alizadeh	0	0	0+0	0	0+0	0	0+0	0
22	FW	(Iran) IRI	Masoud Ebrahimzadeh	0	0	0+0	0	0+0	0	0+0	0
23	DF	(Iran) IRI	Meysam Maniei	0	0	0+0	0	0+0	0	0+0	0
24	MF	(Iran) IRI	Mohammad Lotfi	0	0	0+0	0	0+0	0	0+0	0
	DF	(Iran) IRI	Mohsen Hosseini	0	0	0+0	0	0+0	0	0+0	0

=== Top scorers ===
Includes all competitive matches. The list is sorted by shirt number when total goals are equal.

Last updated on 22 February 2011

Ranking	Position	Nation	Name	Pro League	Champions League	Hazfi Cup	Total
Own goal				0	0	0	0
TOTALS				0	0	0	0

Friendlies and Pre season goals are not recognized as competitive match goals.

=== Top assistors ===
Includes all competitive matches. The list is sorted by shirt number when total assistors are equal.

Last updated on 22 February 2011

Ranking	Position	Nation	Name	Pro League	Champions League	Hazfi Cup	Total
TOTALS				0	0	0	0

Friendlies and Pre season goals are not recognized as competitive match assist.

=== Disciplinary record ===
Includes all competitive matches. Players with 1 card or more included only.

Last updated on 22 February 2011

				Iran Pro League			AFC Champions League			Hazfi Cup			Total		
Position	Nation	Number	Name	Yellow card	(yellow card) (yellow-red card)	Red card	Yellow card	(yellow card) (yellow-red card)	Red card	Yellow card	(yellow card) (yellow-red card)	Red card	Yellow card	(yellow card) (yellow-red card)	Red card
TOTALS				0	0	0	0	0	0	0	0	0	0	0	0

=== Goals conceded ===
- Updated on 21 May 2011

Position	Nation	Number	Name	Pro League	Champions League	Hazfi Cup	Total	Minutes per goal
TOTALS				0	0	0	0	0

=== Matches played ===
- Updated on 2 April 2011

Position	Nation	Number	Name	Pro League	Champions League	Hazfi Cup	Total
TOTALS				0	0	0	0

=== Own goals ===
- Updated on 2 April 2011

Position	Nation	Number	Name	Pro League	Champions League	Hazfi Cup	Total
TOTALS				0	0	0	0

== Club ==
=== Kit ===
Supplier: Uhlsport
Sponsor(s): Hamrah Aval & Hamrah Aval

Home Kit	Away Kit

=== Coaching staff ===
Position	Staff
Head coach	(Iran) Amir Ghalenoei
Assistant coach	(Iran) Sattar Hamedani
Assistant coach	(Brazil) Venda Kovich
Technical manager	(Iran) Amir Hajsafi
Goalkeeping coach	(Iran) Karim Bostani
Bodybuilding Coach	(Iran) Gholamreza Baghabadi

=== Other information ===
Chairman	(Iran) Mohammad Hossein Jafari
Ground (capacity and dimensions)	Yadegar-e-Emam Stadium (85,000 / )

Updated to match played 1 October 2010

== See also ==
- 2011–12 Persian Gulf Cup
- 2011–12 Hazfi Cup
