= List of Iranian football transfers winter 2012–13 =

This is a list of Iranian football transfers for the 2012–13 winter transfer window. Only moves featuring at least one Iran Pro League or Azadegan League club are listed.

== Rules and regulations ==
The Iranian football clubs participating in the 2012–13 Iran Pro League were allowed to have a maximum of 35 players (including up to maximum 4 non-Iranian players) in their player lists, which would be categorized in the following groups:

- Up to maximum 21 adult (over 23 years old) players
- Up to maximum 6 under-23 players (i.e. the player whose birth is after 19 July 1989).
- Up to maximum 5 under-21 players (i.e. the player whose birth is after 19 July 1991).
- Up to maximum 3 under-19 players (i.e. the player whose birth is after 19 July 1993).

Based on the fact that the League is started on 19 July 2012.

According to Iran Football Federation rules, each Football Club is allowed to take up to maximum 7 new player in the winter mid-season transfer time. These seven new players includes both Iranian and non-Iranian adult players whose ages are over 23 years old. In addition to these seven new players, the clubs are also able to take some new under-23, under 21, and under-19 years old players, if they have some free place in these categories in their player lists.

== Iran Pro League ==
=== Aluminium Hormozgan ===
In: Note: Flags indicate national team as defined under FIFA eligibility rules; some limited exceptions apply. Players may hold more than one non-FIFA nationality.

No.	Pos.	Nation	Player
40	FW	IRN	Milad Meydavoudi (from Esteghlal)
35	FW	BIH	Riad Demic (from (Bosnia and Herzegovina) FK Velež Mostar)
30	FW	IRN	Mojtaba Zarei (from Gahar Zagros)
12	FW	LBY	Éamon Zayed (from Persepolis)

Out: Note: Flags indicate national team as defined under FIFA eligibility rules; some limited exceptions apply. Players may hold more than one non-FIFA nationality.

No.	Pos.	Nation	Player
—	MF	IRN	Davoud Daneshdoost (to Aboomoslem)

=== Damash Gilan ===
In: Note: Flags indicate national team as defined under FIFA eligibility rules; some limited exceptions apply. Players may hold more than one non-FIFA nationality.

No.	Pos.	Nation	Player
19	FW	FRA	Boubacar Kébé (Free Agent)
3	DF	BRA	Arilson (from (Brazil) Grêmio Barueri)
21	DF	IRN	Abouzar Rahimi (from Sanat Naft)
5	MF	IRN	Saeed Halafi (from Sanat Naft)
31	MF	IRN	Alireza Nikbakht Vahedi (from Free Agent)
24	FW	IRN	Masood Hassan Zadeh (from Mes Rafsanjan)

Out: Note: Flags indicate national team as defined under FIFA eligibility rules; some limited exceptions apply. Players may hold more than one non-FIFA nationality.

No.	Pos.	Nation	Player
19	DF	IRN	Mehdi Kiani (to Sanat Naft)
5	DF	IRN	Masoud Zarei (to Saipa Shomal)
15	MF	IRN	Behnam Afsheh (to Mes Sarcheshmeh)
24	FW	IRN	Saeed Mortazavi (On loan to Parseh)
23	DF	IRN	Kenan Tahernejad (On loan to Chooka)
—	DF	IRN	Mohammadreza Edalatpanah (On loan to Chooka)

=== Esteghlal ===
In: Note: Flags indicate national team as defined under FIFA eligibility rules; some limited exceptions apply. Players may hold more than one non-FIFA nationality.

No.	Pos.	Nation	Player
19	MF	IRN	Abbas Mohammad Rezaei (On loan from Fajr Sepasi)
12	DF	IRN	Hassan Ashjari (from Sepahan)
24	FW	IRN	Farzad Hatami (from Tractor Sazi)
25	DF	IRN	Hojjat Chaharmahali (Free Agent)
38	MF	BOL	Vicente Arze (from (Belgium) Charleroi)
11	FW	IRN	Iman Mousavi (from Naft Tehran)
7	FW	IRN	Farhad Majidi (from Free Agent)

Out: Note: Flags indicate national team as defined under FIFA eligibility rules; some limited exceptions apply. Players may hold more than one non-FIFA nationality.

No.	Pos.	Nation	Player
32	MF	IRN	Ferydoon Zandi (to (Qatar) Al Ahli)
37	MF	BRA	Fabio Januario (Released)
15	DF	IRN	Mohammad Ansari (to Fajr Sepasi)
16	DF	IRN	Meysam Hosseini (to Naft Tehran)
11	FW	IRN	Amin Manouchehri (to Naft Tehran)
10	FW	IRN	Milad Meydavoudi (to Aluminium Hormozgan)
30	MF	BRA	Rodrigo Tosi (Released)
29	GK	AUS	Liam Reddy (Released)

=== Fajr Sepasi ===
In: Note: Flags indicate national team as defined under FIFA eligibility rules; some limited exceptions apply. Players may hold more than one non-FIFA nationality.

No.	Pos.	Nation	Player
18	DF	IRN	Mohammad Ansari (from Esteghlal)
15	FW	IRN	Moslem Firouz Abadi (from Mes Sarcheshmeh)
35	FW	IRN	Hossein Fazeli (from Sepahan U23)
29	MF	IRN	Hossein Kazemi (from Mes Kerman)
34	DF	IRN	Mohammad Faramarzi (from Saipa U23)
38	FW	CUW	Sendley Sidney Bito (from (Ukraine) Arsenal Kyiv)

Out: Note: Flags indicate national team as defined under FIFA eligibility rules; some limited exceptions apply. Players may hold more than one non-FIFA nationality.

No.	Pos.	Nation	Player
9	MF	IRN	Reza Haghighi (to Persepolis)
7	MF	IRN	Abbas Mohammad Rezaei (On loan to Esteghlal)
25	DF	BRA	Diego Máximo (to Paykan)
12	FW	IRN	Babak Latifi (to Saipa)
32	MF	IRN	Mohammad Reza Jalali (to Esteghlal Ahvaz)
40	MF	IRN	Hossein Khosravi (to Sang Ahan Bafq)
27	MF	IRN	Hadi Daghagheleh (Released)
8	FW	IRN	Ali Molaei (to Shahrdari Tabriz)
16	MF	IRN	Ali Reza Latifi (to Shahrdari Tabriz)

=== Foolad ===
In: Note: Flags indicate national team as defined under FIFA eligibility rules; some limited exceptions apply. Players may hold more than one non-FIFA nationality.

No.	Pos.	Nation	Player
32	DF	IRN	Vafa Hakhamaneshi (from Naft Tehran)
18	MF	BRA	Roberto Neves (from unknown)
36	MF	IRN	Valid Mashayzadeh (from Foolad U23)

Out: Note: Flags indicate national team as defined under FIFA eligibility rules; some limited exceptions apply. Players may hold more than one non-FIFA nationality.

No.	Pos.	Nation	Player
13	MF	ROU	Claudiu Ionescu (Released)
16	MF	IRN	Hakim Nassari (on loan at Paykan)
—	MF	IRN	Amir Sharafi (to Hafari Ahvaz)

=== Gahar Zagros ===
In: Note: Flags indicate national team as defined under FIFA eligibility rules; some limited exceptions apply. Players may hold more than one non-FIFA nationality.

No.	Pos.	Nation	Player
12	GK	IRN	Abolfazl Mousapour (from Homa)
35	MF	IRN	Omid Kharaji (from Sepahan U23)
8	MF	IRN	Hamed Pouromran (from Shahrdari Langarud)
37	MF	IRN	Omid Sing (from Foolad U23)
38	FW	IRN	Yazdan Abbasian (from Foolad U23)
39	MF	IRN	Davoud Bekouk (from Machinesazi)
40	MF	IRN	Hosein Divsalar (from Parseh)
6	FW	ENG	Daniel Moorehead (from Durham F.C.)

Out: Note: Flags indicate national team as defined under FIFA eligibility rules; some limited exceptions apply. Players may hold more than one non-FIFA nationality.

No.	Pos.	Nation	Player
11	FW	IRN	Mojtaba Zarei (to Aluminium Hormozgan)
2	DF	IRN	Alireza Mohammad (to Zob Ahan)
1	GK	ARM	Grigor Meliksetyan (Released)
3	DF	IRN	Hadi Rekabi (to Sang Ahan Bafq)
8	MF	IRN	Siamak Sarlak (to Sanat Naft)

=== Malavan ===
In: Note: Flags indicate national team as defined under FIFA eligibility rules; some limited exceptions apply. Players may hold more than one non-FIFA nationality.

No.	Pos.	Nation	Player
3	DF	IRN	Hadi Tamini (from Sepahan)
19	DF	IRN	Arash Gholizadeh (from Steel Azin)
21	DF	IRN	Mohammad Hosseini (from Zob Ahan)

Out: Note: Flags indicate national team as defined under FIFA eligibility rules; some limited exceptions apply. Players may hold more than one non-FIFA nationality.

No.	Pos.	Nation	Player
—	DF	IRN	Alireza Jarahkar (released)
19	MF	IRN	Mehran Jafari (to Alvand Hamedan)
5	DF	IRN	Mohammad Amin Hajmohammadi (to Naft Tehran)

=== Mes Kerman ===
In: Note: Flags indicate national team as defined under FIFA eligibility rules; some limited exceptions apply. Players may hold more than one non-FIFA nationality.

No.	Pos.	Nation	Player
27	FW	IRN	Mansour Tanhaei (from Saipa)

Out: Note: Flags indicate national team as defined under FIFA eligibility rules; some limited exceptions apply. Players may hold more than one non-FIFA nationality.

No.	Pos.	Nation	Player
4	MF	IRN	Hossein Kazemi (to Fajr Sepasi)

=== Naft Tehran ===
In: Note: Flags indicate national team as defined under FIFA eligibility rules; some limited exceptions apply. Players may hold more than one non-FIFA nationality.

No.	Pos.	Nation	Player
16	DF	IRN	Meisam Hosseini (from Esteghlal)
11	FW	IRN	Amin Manouchehri (from Esteghlal)
10	FW	IRN	Reza Norouzi (from Free Agent)
20	MF	IRN	Mohsen Yousefi (from Saipa)
5	DF	IRN	Mohammad Amin Hajmohammadi (from Malavan)

Out: Note: Flags indicate national team as defined under FIFA eligibility rules; some limited exceptions apply. Players may hold more than one non-FIFA nationality.

No.	Pos.	Nation	Player
10	FW	IRN	Iman Mousavi (to Esteghlal)
5	DF	IRN	Vafa Hakhamaneshi (to Foolad)
11	MF	IRN	Mostafa Mahdavi (Released)
30	MF	IRN	Hossein Babaei (to Mes Sarcheshmeh)
27	MF	IRN	Ali Vaghef (to Mes Sarcheshmeh)

=== Paykan ===
In: Note: Flags indicate national team as defined under FIFA eligibility rules; some limited exceptions apply. Players may hold more than one non-FIFA nationality.

No.	Pos.	Nation	Player
3	DF	BRA	Máximo (from Fajr Sepasi)
6	MF	IRN	Milad Zeneyedpour (from Sepahan)
8	MF	IRN	Davoud Haghi (from Free agent)
15	FW	IRN	Keyvan Vahdani
17	MF	IRN	Hossein Ghanbari
21	FW	IRN	Hakim Nassari (on loan from Foolad)
29	DF	IRN	Vahid Heydarieh (from Paykan U23)
35	GK	IRN	Hossein Ashena (from Free agent)
40	MF	IRN	Peyman Miri

Out: Note: Flags indicate national team as defined under FIFA eligibility rules; some limited exceptions apply. Players may hold more than one non-FIFA nationality.

No.	Pos.	Nation	Player
3	DF	IRN	Rouhollah Soltani (to Shahrdari Tabriz)
6	MF	IRN	Ali Akbar Farhang (Released)
8	MF	IRN	Sadegh Gashni (to Iranjavan)
15	MF	IRN	Mostafa Agheli (to Shahrdari Bandar Abbas)
17	MF	IRN	Mohammad Gorjizadeh (to Etka)
21	DF	IRN	Nader Ahmadi (Released)
33	GK	IRN	Masoud Khangholizad (Released)

=== Persepolis ===
In: Note: Flags indicate national team as defined under FIFA eligibility rules; some limited exceptions apply. Players may hold more than one non-FIFA nationality.

No.	Pos.	Nation	Player
33	MF	IRN	Reza Haghighi (from Fajr Sepasi)
39	MF	IRN	Adel Kolahkaj (from Sepahan)
1	GK	IRN	Reza Mohammadi (from Sepahan)
29	MF	SRB	Marko Perović (from (Serbia) Red Star Belgrade)
17	MF	MKD	Vlatko Grozdanoski (from (China) Liaoning Whowin)
12	DF	IRN	Roozbeh Cheshmi (from Moghavemat Tehran)

Out: Note: Flags indicate national team as defined under FIFA eligibility rules; some limited exceptions apply. Players may hold more than one non-FIFA nationality.

No.	Pos.	Nation	Player
15	MF	BRA	Roberto Sousa (Released)
12	FW	LBY	Éamon Zayed (to Aluminium Hormozgan)
5	MF	IRN	Saman Aghazamani (to Rah Ahan)
17	FW	IRN	Javad Kazemian (to Tractor Sazi)
7	MF	IRN	Hamidreza Aliasgari (on loan to Rah Ahan)
1	GK	IRN	Shahab Gordan (to Sepahan)

=== Rah Ahan ===
In: Note: Flags indicate national team as defined under FIFA eligibility rules; some limited exceptions apply. Players may hold more than one non-FIFA nationality.

No.	Pos.	Nation	Player
11	FW	BRA	Igor Castro (from (Japan) Yokohama)
18	MF	IRN	Hamidreza Aliasgari (On loan from Persepolis)
25	MF	IRN	Saman Aghazamani (from Persepolis)

Out: Note: Flags indicate national team as defined under FIFA eligibility rules; some limited exceptions apply. Players may hold more than one non-FIFA nationality.

No.	Pos.	Nation	Player
13	DF	IRN	Hossein Kaabi (to Sanat Naft)
18	MF	IRN	Ali Amiri (to Parseh Tehran)
11	FW	IRN	Iman Razaghirad (to Saba Qom)

=== Saba Qom ===
In: Note: Flags indicate national team as defined under FIFA eligibility rules; some limited exceptions apply. Players may hold more than one non-FIFA nationality.

No.	Pos.	Nation	Player
24	FW	IRN	Iman Razaghirad (from Rah Ahan)
5	DF	IRN	Sohrab Bakhtiarizadeh (from Free Agent)
15	DF	IRN	Meysam Khosravi (from Free Agent)

Out: Note: Flags indicate national team as defined under FIFA eligibility rules; some limited exceptions apply. Players may hold more than one non-FIFA nationality.

No.	Pos.	Nation	Player
10	FW	IRN	Mohsen Khalili (Released)

=== Saipa ===
In: Note: Flags indicate national team as defined under FIFA eligibility rules; some limited exceptions apply. Players may hold more than one non-FIFA nationality.

No.	Pos.	Nation	Player
11	FW	IRN	Babak Latifi (from Fajr Sepasi)

Out: Note: Flags indicate national team as defined under FIFA eligibility rules; some limited exceptions apply. Players may hold more than one non-FIFA nationality.

No.	Pos.	Nation	Player
11	MF	IRN	Mohsen Yousefi (to Naft Tehran)
27	FW	IRN	Mansour Tanhaei (to Mes Kerman)

=== Sanat Naft ===
In: Note: Flags indicate national team as defined under FIFA eligibility rules; some limited exceptions apply. Players may hold more than one non-FIFA nationality.

No.	Pos.	Nation	Player
14	DF	IRN	Hossein Kaabi (from Rah Ahan)
25	MF	IRN	Siamak Sarlak (from Gahar)
33	GK	IRN	Ali Asakareh (from Shahrdari Bandar Abbas)
34	MF	POR	Hugo Machado (from Zob Ahan)
24	DF	IRN	Hadi Ramezani (from Mes Sarcheshmeh)
21	MF	IRN	Mehdi Kiani (from Damash)

Out: Note: Flags indicate national team as defined under FIFA eligibility rules; some limited exceptions apply. Players may hold more than one non-FIFA nationality.

No.	Pos.	Nation	Player
2	DF	IRN	Abouzar Rahimi (to Damash)
10	FW	IRN	Saeed Hallafi (to Damash)
3	DF	IRN	Mostafa Sabri (Released)
1	GK	CRO	Marko Šimić (Released)
17	MF	BRA	Diogo Melo (Released)

=== Sepahan ===
In: Note: Flags indicate national team as defined under FIFA eligibility rules; some limited exceptions apply. Players may hold more than one non-FIFA nationality.

No.	Pos.	Nation	Player
6	DF	AUS	Milan Susak (from (China) Tianjin Teda)
28	DF	IRN	Ehsan Hajsafi (loan return from Tractor Sazi)
35	GK	IRN	Shahab Gordan (from Persepolis)
36	GK	IRN	Mohammad Mahmoudvand (from Free Agent)

Out: Note: Flags indicate national team as defined under FIFA eligibility rules; some limited exceptions apply. Players may hold more than one non-FIFA nationality.

No.	Pos.	Nation	Player
2	DF	IRN	Hassan Ashjari (to Esteghlal)
6	DF	IRN	Hadi Tamini (to Malavan)
7	MF	IRN	Milad Zeneyedpour (to Paykan)
22	GK	IRN	Reza Mohammadi (to Persepolis)
40	MF	IRN	Adel Kolahkaj (to Perspolis)
31	FW	IRN	Sardar Azmoun (to (Russia) Rubin Kazan)

=== Tractor Sazi ===
In: Note: Flags indicate national team as defined under FIFA eligibility rules; some limited exceptions apply. Players may hold more than one non-FIFA nationality.

No.	Pos.	Nation	Player
4	DF	IRN	Habib Gordani (from Shahrdari Tabriz)
9	FW	IRN	Javad Kazemian (from Persepolis)
21	FW	BRA	Jhonatan Pereira (from (Moldova) Sheriff Tiraspol)
30	FW	BRA	Geílson (from (Brazil) Santos)

Out: Note: Flags indicate national team as defined under FIFA eligibility rules; some limited exceptions apply. Players may hold more than one non-FIFA nationality.

No.	Pos.	Nation	Player
9	FW	POR	Anselmo Cardoso (Released)
24	FW	IRN	Farzad Hatami (to Esteghlal)
18	MF	POR	João Vilela (Released)
28	DF	IRN	Ehsan Hajsafi (loan return to Sepahan)

=== Zob Ahan ===
In: Note: Flags indicate national team as defined under FIFA eligibility rules; some limited exceptions apply. Players may hold more than one non-FIFA nationality.

No.	Pos.	Nation	Player
35	FW	IRN	Mohsen Bayatinia (from Free Agent)
15	MF	IRN	Mohammad Mohammadi Panah (from Zob Ahan U-23)
31	DF	IRN	Mohammad Borjlou (from Shahrdari Tabriz)
18	MF	IRN	Ehsan Pahlavan (from Gostaresh Foolad)
22	GK	ARM	Gevorg Kasparov (from (Armenia) FC Mika)
2	DF	IRN	Alireza Mohammad (from Gahar Zagros)
5	DF	IRN	Alireza Jarrahkar (from Malavan)
38	GK	IRN	Ali Mohsenzadeh (from Moghavemat Tehran)
23	FW	CIV	Ismaël Béko Fofana (from (Armenia) Shirak FC)

Out: Note: Flags indicate national team as defined under FIFA eligibility rules; some limited exceptions apply. Players may hold more than one non-FIFA nationality.

No.	Pos.	Nation	Player
13	DF	IRN	Ebrahim Mohammadi (to Aboomoslem)
19	DF	IRN	Milad Mirtorabi (Released)
21	FW	IRN	Mojtaba Babak (Released)
23	MF	IRN	Ahmad Mohammadpour (to Aboomoslem)
26	FW	MKD	Aco Stojkov (Released)
27	MF	POR	Hugo Machado (to Sanat Naft)
17	DF	IRN	Hamid Parvar (Released)

== Azadegan League ==
=== Aboomoslem ===
In: Note: Flags indicate national team as defined under FIFA eligibility rules; some limited exceptions apply. Players may hold more than one non-FIFA nationality.

No.	Pos.	Nation	Player
—		IRN	Behnam Biranvand (from Shahin)
—	MF	IRN	Davoud Daneshdoost (from Aluminium)
—	DF	IRN	Rasoul Kor (from Etka)
—	DF	IRN	Ebrahim Mohammadi (from Zobahan)
—	MF	IRN	Hojat Zadmahmoud (from Gostaresh Foolad)

Out: Note: Flags indicate national team as defined under FIFA eligibility rules; some limited exceptions apply. Players may hold more than one non-FIFA nationality.

No.	Pos.	Nation	Player
—	MF	IRN	Ahmad Taghavi (to PAS Hamedan F.C.)
—		IRN	Hamid Gholami (Released)
—		IRN	Mohammad Kouti (Released)
—		IRN	Abdollah Tohidi (Released)
—		IRN	Mohammad Rostami (Released)

=== Alvand Hamedan ===
In: Note: Flags indicate national team as defined under FIFA eligibility rules; some limited exceptions apply. Players may hold more than one non-FIFA nationality.

No.	Pos.	Nation	Player

Out: Note: Flags indicate national team as defined under FIFA eligibility rules; some limited exceptions apply. Players may hold more than one non-FIFA nationality.

No.	Pos.	Nation	Player

=== Esteghlal Ahvaz ===
In: Note: Flags indicate national team as defined under FIFA eligibility rules; some limited exceptions apply. Players may hold more than one non-FIFA nationality.

No.	Pos.	Nation	Player

Out: Note: Flags indicate national team as defined under FIFA eligibility rules; some limited exceptions apply. Players may hold more than one non-FIFA nationality.

No.	Pos.	Nation	Player

=== Esteghlal Sanati ===
In: Note: Flags indicate national team as defined under FIFA eligibility rules; some limited exceptions apply. Players may hold more than one non-FIFA nationality.

No.	Pos.	Nation	Player

Out: Note: Flags indicate national team as defined under FIFA eligibility rules; some limited exceptions apply. Players may hold more than one non-FIFA nationality.

No.	Pos.	Nation	Player

=== Etka ===
In: Note: Flags indicate national team as defined under FIFA eligibility rules; some limited exceptions apply. Players may hold more than one non-FIFA nationality.

No.	Pos.	Nation	Player

Out: Note: Flags indicate national team as defined under FIFA eligibility rules; some limited exceptions apply. Players may hold more than one non-FIFA nationality.

No.	Pos.	Nation	Player
—	DF	IRN	Rasoul Kor (to Aboomoslem)

=== Foolad Yazd ===
In: Note: Flags indicate national team as defined under FIFA eligibility rules; some limited exceptions apply. Players may hold more than one non-FIFA nationality.

No.	Pos.	Nation	Player

Out: Note: Flags indicate national team as defined under FIFA eligibility rules; some limited exceptions apply. Players may hold more than one non-FIFA nationality.

No.	Pos.	Nation	Player

=== Gol Gohar ===
In: Note: Flags indicate national team as defined under FIFA eligibility rules; some limited exceptions apply. Players may hold more than one non-FIFA nationality.

No.	Pos.	Nation	Player

Out: Note: Flags indicate national team as defined under FIFA eligibility rules; some limited exceptions apply. Players may hold more than one non-FIFA nationality.

No.	Pos.	Nation	Player

=== Gostaresh Foolad ===
In: Note: Flags indicate national team as defined under FIFA eligibility rules; some limited exceptions apply. Players may hold more than one non-FIFA nationality.

No.	Pos.	Nation	Player

Out: Note: Flags indicate national team as defined under FIFA eligibility rules; some limited exceptions apply. Players may hold more than one non-FIFA nationality.

No.	Pos.	Nation	Player
—	GK	IRN	Mohammad Hossein Naeiji (to PAS Hamedan F.C.)
—	MF	IRN	Hojat Zadmahmoud (to Aboomoslem)

=== Gostaresh Foolad Sahand ===
In: Note: Flags indicate national team as defined under FIFA eligibility rules; some limited exceptions apply. Players may hold more than one non-FIFA nationality.

No.	Pos.	Nation	Player

Out: Note: Flags indicate national team as defined under FIFA eligibility rules; some limited exceptions apply. Players may hold more than one non-FIFA nationality.

No.	Pos.	Nation	Player

=== Hafari Ahvaz ===
In: Note: Flags indicate national team as defined under FIFA eligibility rules; some limited exceptions apply. Players may hold more than one non-FIFA nationality.

No.	Pos.	Nation	Player

Out: Note: Flags indicate national team as defined under FIFA eligibility rules; some limited exceptions apply. Players may hold more than one non-FIFA nationality.

No.	Pos.	Nation	Player

=== Iranjavan ===
In: Note: Flags indicate national team as defined under FIFA eligibility rules; some limited exceptions apply. Players may hold more than one non-FIFA nationality.

No.	Pos.	Nation	Player

Out: Note: Flags indicate national team as defined under FIFA eligibility rules; some limited exceptions apply. Players may hold more than one non-FIFA nationality.

No.	Pos.	Nation	Player

=== Machine Sazi ===
In: Note: Flags indicate national team as defined under FIFA eligibility rules; some limited exceptions apply. Players may hold more than one non-FIFA nationality.

No.	Pos.	Nation	Player

Out: Note: Flags indicate national team as defined under FIFA eligibility rules; some limited exceptions apply. Players may hold more than one non-FIFA nationality.

No.	Pos.	Nation	Player

=== Mes Rafsanjan ===
In: Note: Flags indicate national team as defined under FIFA eligibility rules; some limited exceptions apply. Players may hold more than one non-FIFA nationality.

No.	Pos.	Nation	Player

Out: Note: Flags indicate national team as defined under FIFA eligibility rules; some limited exceptions apply. Players may hold more than one non-FIFA nationality.

No.	Pos.	Nation	Player

=== Mes Sarcheshmeh ===
In: Note: Flags indicate national team as defined under FIFA eligibility rules; some limited exceptions apply. Players may hold more than one non-FIFA nationality.

No.	Pos.	Nation	Player

Out: Note: Flags indicate national team as defined under FIFA eligibility rules; some limited exceptions apply. Players may hold more than one non-FIFA nationality.

No.	Pos.	Nation	Player

=== Naft Masjed Soleyman ===
In: Note: Flags indicate national team as defined under FIFA eligibility rules; some limited exceptions apply. Players may hold more than one non-FIFA nationality.

No.	Pos.	Nation	Player

Out: Note: Flags indicate national team as defined under FIFA eligibility rules; some limited exceptions apply. Players may hold more than one non-FIFA nationality.

No.	Pos.	Nation	Player

=== Nassaji ===
In: Note: Flags indicate national team as defined under FIFA eligibility rules; some limited exceptions apply. Players may hold more than one non-FIFA nationality.

No.	Pos.	Nation	Player

Out: Note: Flags indicate national team as defined under FIFA eligibility rules; some limited exceptions apply. Players may hold more than one non-FIFA nationality.

No.	Pos.	Nation	Player

=== Nirooye Zamini ===
In: Note: Flags indicate national team as defined under FIFA eligibility rules; some limited exceptions apply. Players may hold more than one non-FIFA nationality.

No.	Pos.	Nation	Player

Out: Note: Flags indicate national team as defined under FIFA eligibility rules; some limited exceptions apply. Players may hold more than one non-FIFA nationality.

No.	Pos.	Nation	Player

=== Parseh Tehran ===
In: Note: Flags indicate national team as defined under FIFA eligibility rules; some limited exceptions apply. Players may hold more than one non-FIFA nationality.

No.	Pos.	Nation	Player
—	FW	IRN	Saeed Mortazavi (On Loan from Damash)

Out: Note: Flags indicate national team as defined under FIFA eligibility rules; some limited exceptions apply. Players may hold more than one non-FIFA nationality.

No.	Pos.	Nation	Player

=== PAS Hamadan ===
In: Note: Flags indicate national team as defined under FIFA eligibility rules; some limited exceptions apply. Players may hold more than one non-FIFA nationality.

No.	Pos.	Nation	Player
—	GK	IRN	Mohammad Hossein Naeiji (from Gostaresh Foolad F.C.)
—	MF	IRN	Ahmad Taghavi (from F.C. Aboomoslem)

Out: Note: Flags indicate national team as defined under FIFA eligibility rules; some limited exceptions apply. Players may hold more than one non-FIFA nationality.

No.	Pos.	Nation	Player

=== Saipa Shomal ===
In: Note: Flags indicate national team as defined under FIFA eligibility rules; some limited exceptions apply. Players may hold more than one non-FIFA nationality.

No.	Pos.	Nation	Player

Out: Note: Flags indicate national team as defined under FIFA eligibility rules; some limited exceptions apply. Players may hold more than one non-FIFA nationality.

No.	Pos.	Nation	Player

=== Sang Ahan Bafq Yazd ===
In: Note: Flags indicate national team as defined under FIFA eligibility rules; some limited exceptions apply. Players may hold more than one non-FIFA nationality.

No.	Pos.	Nation	Player
—	MF	IRN	Ali Amiri (from Free agent)

Out: Note: Flags indicate national team as defined under FIFA eligibility rules; some limited exceptions apply. Players may hold more than one non-FIFA nationality.

No.	Pos.	Nation	Player

=== Shahin Bushehr ===
In: Note: Flags indicate national team as defined under FIFA eligibility rules; some limited exceptions apply. Players may hold more than one non-FIFA nationality.

No.	Pos.	Nation	Player

Out: Note: Flags indicate national team as defined under FIFA eligibility rules; some limited exceptions apply. Players may hold more than one non-FIFA nationality.

No.	Pos.	Nation	Player
—		IRN	Behnam Biranvand (to Aboomoslem)

=== Shahrdari Arak ===
In: Note: Flags indicate national team as defined under FIFA eligibility rules; some limited exceptions apply. Players may hold more than one non-FIFA nationality.

No.	Pos.	Nation	Player

Out: Note: Flags indicate national team as defined under FIFA eligibility rules; some limited exceptions apply. Players may hold more than one non-FIFA nationality.

No.	Pos.	Nation	Player

=== Shahrdari Bandar Abbas ===
In: Note: Flags indicate national team as defined under FIFA eligibility rules; some limited exceptions apply. Players may hold more than one non-FIFA nationality.

No.	Pos.	Nation	Player

Out: Note: Flags indicate national team as defined under FIFA eligibility rules; some limited exceptions apply. Players may hold more than one non-FIFA nationality.

No.	Pos.	Nation	Player

=== Shahrdari Tabriz ===
In: Note: Flags indicate national team as defined under FIFA eligibility rules; some limited exceptions apply. Players may hold more than one non-FIFA nationality.

No.	Pos.	Nation	Player

Out: Note: Flags indicate national team as defined under FIFA eligibility rules; some limited exceptions apply. Players may hold more than one non-FIFA nationality.

No.	Pos.	Nation	Player

=== Shahrdari Yasuj ===
In: Note: Flags indicate national team as defined under FIFA eligibility rules; some limited exceptions apply. Players may hold more than one non-FIFA nationality.

No.	Pos.	Nation	Player

Out: Note: Flags indicate national team as defined under FIFA eligibility rules; some limited exceptions apply. Players may hold more than one non-FIFA nationality.

No.	Pos.	Nation	Player

=== Shirin Faraz ===
In: Note: Flags indicate national team as defined under FIFA eligibility rules; some limited exceptions apply. Players may hold more than one non-FIFA nationality.

No.	Pos.	Nation	Player

Out: Note: Flags indicate national team as defined under FIFA eligibility rules; some limited exceptions apply. Players may hold more than one non-FIFA nationality.

No.	Pos.	Nation	Player

=== Steel Azin ===
In: Note: Flags indicate national team as defined under FIFA eligibility rules; some limited exceptions apply. Players may hold more than one non-FIFA nationality.

No.	Pos.	Nation	Player

Out: Note: Flags indicate national team as defined under FIFA eligibility rules; some limited exceptions apply. Players may hold more than one non-FIFA nationality.

No.	Pos.	Nation	Player
