= Masoud Ebrahimzadeh =

Iranian football left back

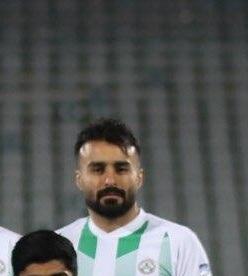

Personal information
- Date of birth: 16 January 1989 (age 37)
- Place of birth: Ahar, Iran
- Height: 1.78 m (5 ft 10 in)
- Position: Left back

Youth career
- 2003–2007: Tractor

Senior career*
| Years | Team | Apps | (Gls) |
| 2007–2014 | Tractor | 107 | (16) |
| 2014–2016 | Saipa | 21 | (0) |
| 2016–2017 | Gostaresh Foulad | 25 | (4) |
| 2017–2018 | Sanat Naft Abadan | 24 | (2) |
| 2018–2023 | Zob Ahan | 96 | (2) |

International career
| 2010–2011 | Iran U23 | 7 | (0) |
- * Club domestic league appearances and goals

Masoud Ebrahimzadeh (Persian: مسعود ابراهیم زاده; born 16 January 1989) is an Iranian former professional football player who played as a left back (defender).۱۲۳

== Club career ==
Ebrahimzadeh has spent his entire career with Tractor.

On 15 July 2014, Ebrahimzadeh joined Saipa signing a two-year contract.

=== Club career statistics ===
As of 26 February 2018

| Club performance | | | League | | Cup | | Continental | | Total | |
| Season | Club | League | Apps | Goals | Apps | Goals | Apps | Goals | Apps | Goals |
| Iran | | | League | | Hazfi Cup | | Asia | | Total | |
|---|---|---|---|---|---|---|---|---|---|---|
| 2007–08 | Tractor | Azadegan League | | 1 | | | - | - | | |
| 2008–09 | Tractor | Azadegan League | | 9 | | | - | - | | |
| 2009–10 | Tractor | Persian Gulf Cup | 27 | 1 | | | - | - | | |
| 2010–11 | Tractor | Persian Gulf Cup | 31 | 5 | 1 | 0 | - | - | 32 | 5 |
| 2011–12 | Tractor | Persian Gulf Cup | 10 | 0 | 0 | 0 | - | - | 10 | 0 |
| 2012–13 | Tractor | Persian Gulf Cup | 19 | 1 | 1 | 0 | 5 | 1 | 25 | 2 |
| 2013–14 | Tractor | Persian Gulf Cup | 20 | 0 | 0 | 0 | 5 | 0 | 25 | 0 |
| 2014–15 | Saipa | Persian Gulf Cup | 7 | 0 | 0 | 0 | 0 | 0 | 7 | 0 |
| 2015–16 | Saipa | Persian Gulf Cup | 14 | 0 | 2 | 0 | 0 | 0 | 16 | 0 |
| 2016–17 | Gostaresh Foulad | Persian Gulf Cup | 25 | 4 | 2 | 1 | 0 | 0 | 27 | 5 |
| 2017–18 | Sanat Naft | Persian Gulf Cup | 24 | 2 | 4 | 0 | 0 | 0 | 28 | 2 |
| 2018–19 | Zob Ahan | Persian Gulf Cup | 17 | 0 | 0 | 0 | 4 | 0 | 21 | 0 |
| 2019–20 | Zob Ahan | Persian Gulf Cup | 21 | 1 | 0 | 0 | 2 | 0 | 21 | 1 |
| 2020–21 | Zob Ahan | Persian Gulf Cup | 25 | 0 | 1 | 0 | 2 | 0 | 26 | 0 |
| 2021–22 | Zob Ahan | Persian Gulf Cup | 20 | 0 | 1 | 0 | 0 | 0 | 21 | 0 |
| Total | Iran | | | 16 | | | 0 | 0 | | |
| Career total | | | | 16 | | | 0 | 0 | | |

- Assist Goals

| Season | Team | Assists |
|---|---|---|
| 10–11 | Tractor | 0 |
| 11–12 | Tractor | 2 |
| 12–13 | Tractor | 1 |

== Honours ==
=== Club ===
Tractor

- Persian Gulf Pro League : 2011-12 Runner up, 2012-13 Runner up

Tractor

- Hazfi Cup (1): 2013–14
