= Milad Kermani =

Iranian footballer

Personal information
- Full name: Milad Kermani Magham
- Date of birth: August 23, 1992 (age 34)
- Place of birth: Tehran, Iran
- Height: 1.85 m (6 ft 1 in)
- Position: Winger

Team information
- Current team: Moghavemat Tehran
- Number: 7

Youth career
- 2011–2012: Steel Azin
- 2012–2013: Naft Tehran

Senior career*
Years	Team	Apps	(Gls)
2011–2012	Steel Azin	15	(1)
2012–2013	Naft Tehran	4	(0)
2013–2014	Paykan	15	(1)
2014–2015	Saipa	2	(0)
2015–2016	Khoneh Be Khoneh	2	(0)
2016–2017	Esteghlal	0	(0)
2017–2018	Saba Qom	5	(0)
2019–2021	Moghavemat Tehran		

International career
2010–2011	Iran U-20		
2012–2013	Iran U-22		
- * Club domestic league appearances and goals as of 29 November 2014

Milad Kermani (Persian: میلاد کرمانی) is an Iranian football winger.

== Club career ==
=== Steel Azin ===
He started his career with Steel Azin in Division 1.

=== Naft Tehran ===
Kermani joined Naft Tehran in summer 2012 while he mostly played in Tehran Asia Vision U-21 Super League. He made his debut for Naft Tehran against Malavan as a substitute for Yaghoub Karimi in August 2012.

=== Paykan ===
After a season with Naft Tehran, he re-united with his father at Paykan. He helped Paykan to promote to Pro League with 15 appearances and one goal.

=== Saipa ===
Kermani joined to Saipa in summer 2014. He only made 2 appearances for Saipa before he was released from the club on November 29, 2014.

=== Esteghlal ===
On 9 December 2014, he joined Esteghlal.

== Club career statistics ==
As of 29 November 2014

Club	Division	Season	League		Hazfi Cup		Asia		Total	
Club	Division	Season	Apps	Goals	Apps	Goals	Apps	Goals	Apps	Goals
Steel Azin	Division 1	2011–12	15	1	2	0	–	–	17	1
Naft Tehran	Pro League	2012–13	4	0	0	0	–	–	4	0
Paykan	Division 1	2013–14	15	1	1	0	–	–	16	1
Saipa	Pro League	2014–15	2	0	0	0	–	–	2	0
Career Totals			36	2	3	0	0	0	39	2
