= Milad Ghamari =

Iranian footballer

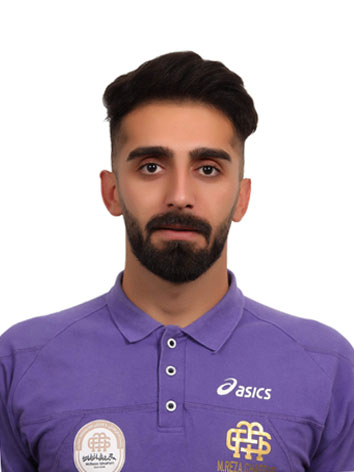

Personal information
- Date of birth: 28 March 1995 (age 31)
- Place of birth: Qazvin, Iran
- Height: 1.85 m (6 ft 1 in)
- Position: Goalkeeper

Youth career
- –2015: Caspian Qazvin
- 2015: Tractor

Senior career*
Years	Team	Apps	(Gls)
2015–2016	Tractor	0	(0)
2016–2017	Oxin Alborz	0	(0)
2017–2018	Nirooye Zamini		
2018–2020	Shohadaye Artesh		
2020–2022	Ghafari Takestan		
2022–2023	Fajr Qazvin		
2023–2024	Donyaye Tiour		
2024–	Fajr Qazvin		
- * Club domestic league appearances and goals as of 1 May 2017

Milad Ghamari (Persian: میلاد قمری, born 28 March 1995) is an Iranian football goalkeeper who plays for Fajr Qazvin.
