= Farid Mokhtari =

Iranian footballer

Personal information
- Date of birth: 21 March 1991 (age 35)
- Place of birth: Lenjan, Iran
- Height: 1.84 m (6 ft 0 in)
- Position: Centre-back

Youth career
- –2013: Zob Ahan

Senior career*
Years	Team	Apps	(Gls)
2014–2015	Zob Ahan		
2015	Malavan	4	(0)
2015–2016	Giti Pasand	23	(0)
2016–2017	Fajr Sepasi	4	(1)
2017	Nirooye Zamini		
2017–2018	Bandar Abbas		
- * Club domestic league appearances and goals

Farid Mokhtari (Persian: فرید مختاری; born 21 March 1991) is an Iranian former football centre-back.
