= Mohammad Afand =

Iranian Football Midfielder

Personal information
- Date of birth: 11 April 1984 (age 42)
- Place of birth: Shiraz, Iran
- Height: 1.83 m (6 ft 0 in)
- Position: Midfielder

Youth career
- –2003: Bargh

Senior career*
Years	Team	Apps	(Gls)
2005–2011	Bargh	109	(4)
2011–2014	Fajr Sepasi	58	(0)
2015–2016	Bargh		
- * Club domestic league appearances and goals

Mohammad Afand (Persian: محمد آفند; born 11 April 1984) is an Iranian former football midfielder.

== Career ==
Afand started his career with Bargh in 2005. He joined Fajr Sepasi in summer 2011.

=== Club Career Statistics ===
- Last Update: 11 May 2012

Club performance			League		Cup		Continental		Total	
Season	Club	League	Apps	Goals	Apps	Goals	Apps	Goals	Apps	Goals
Iran			League		Hazfi Cup		Asia		Total	
2005–06	Bargh	Pro League	1	0			–			
2006–07	Bargh	Pro League	3	0			–			
2007–08	Bargh	Pro League	28	1			–			
2008–09	Bargh	Pro League	31	0			–			
2009–10	Bargh	Division 1	24	1			–			
2010–11	Bargh	Division 1	22	2			–			
2011–12	Fajr Sepasi	Pro League	26	0			–			
2012–13	Fajr Sepasi	Pro League	0	0	0	0	–		0	0
Career total			135	4			0	0		
