= Mehdi Sabeti =

Iranian footballer and coach

Personal information
- Full name: Mehdi Sabeti
- Date of birth: 1 February 1975 (age 51)
- Place of birth: Mashhad, Iran
- Position: Goalkeeper

Youth career
- Aboomoslem

Senior career*
Years	Team	Apps	(Gls)
2003–2006	Aboomoslem	67	(0)
2006–2008	Rah Ahan	30	(0)
2008–2009	Aboomoslem	16	(0)
2009–2013	Tractor Sazi	59	(0)
- * Club domestic league appearances and goals as of 7 December 2013 ‡ National team caps and goals as of 14 August 2010

Mehdi Sabeti (born February 1, 1975) is an Iranian retired football goalkeeper and Goalkeeper coach.

== Club career ==
Sabeti joined Tractor Sazi in 2009, after spending the previous season at Aboomoslem. On 26 February 2013 Sabeti made his AFC Champions League debut, at 38 years of age, in a 3–1 Victory over Al Jazira Club.

Club performance			League		Cup		Continental		Total	
Season	Club	League	Apps	Goals	Apps	Goals	Apps	Goals	Apps	Goals
Iran			League		Hazfi Cup		Asia		Total	
2003–04	Aboomoslem	Persian Gulf Cup	20	0		0	-	-		0
2004–05	Aboomoslem	Persian Gulf Cup	17	0		0	-	-		0
2005–06	Aboomoslem	Persian Gulf Cup	30	0		0	-	-		0
2006–07	Rah Ahan	Persian Gulf Cup	19	0		0	-	-		0
2007–08	Rah Ahan	Persian Gulf Cup	13	0		0	-	-		0
2008–09	Aboomoslem	Persian Gulf Cup	16	0	1	0	-	-	17	0
2009–10	Tractor Sazi	Persian Gulf Cup	23	0		0	-	-		0
2010–11	Tractor Sazi	Persian Gulf Cup	11	0		0	-	-	11	0
2011–12	Tractor Sazi	Persian Gulf Cup	6	0		0	-	-	6	0
2012–13	Tractor Sazi	Persian Gulf Cup	14	0	0	0	2	0	16	0
Total	Iran		152	0		0	2	0		0
Career total			152	0		0	2	0		0
