= Davoud Daneshdoost =

Iranian footballer

Personal information
- Full name: Davoud Daneshdoost
- Date of birth: August 6, 1985 (age 41)
- Place of birth: Kashmar, Iran
- Position: Midfielder

Team information
- Current team: Aboomoslem

Youth career
- 2000–2004: Aboomoslem

Senior career*
Years	Team	Apps	(Gls)
2004–2010	Aboomoslem	108	(10)
2010–2012	Tractor Sazi	5	(0)
2012–2013	Aluminium	7	(1)
2013–	Aboomoslem	0	(0)
- * Club domestic league appearances and goals as of 4 September 2010

Davoud Daneshdoost (Persian: داوود دانش‌دوست; born August 6, 1985) is an Iranian footballer. He currently plays for Aboomoslem in the Azadegan League.

== Club career ==
Daneshdoost has spent his entire career with F.C. Aboomoslem

=== Club career statistics ===
As of 20 November 2010

Club performance			League		Cup		Continental		Total	
Season	Club	League	Apps	Goals	Apps	Goals	Apps	Goals	Apps	Goals
Iran			League		Hazfi Cup		Asia		Total	
2004–05	Aboomoslem	Persian Gulf Cup	1	0			-	-		
2005–06	Aboomoslem	Persian Gulf Cup	10	1			-	-		
2006–07	Aboomoslem	Persian Gulf Cup	21	1			-	-		
2007–08	Aboomoslem	Persian Gulf Cup	20	1	1	0	-	-	21	1
2008–09	Aboomoslem	Persian Gulf Cup	31	4			-	-		
2009–10	Aboomoslem	Persian Gulf Cup	25	3			-	-		
2010–11	Tractor Sazi	Persian Gulf Cup	5	0	1	2	-	-	6	2
Total	Iran		112	10			0	0		
Career total			112	10			0	0		

- Assist Goals

Season	Team	Assists
09–10	Aboomoslem	2
10–11	Tractor Sazi	0
