= Mojtaba Tarshiz =

Iranian footballer (1978–2026)

Personal information
- Date of birth: 26 March 1978
- Place of birth: Qaemshahr, Iran
- Date of death: 8 January 2026 (aged 47)
- Place of death: Andisheh, Tehran, Iran
- Height: 1.73 m (5 ft 8 in)
- Position: Midfielder

Senior career*
Years	Team	Apps	(Gls)
2007–2009	Esteghlal Ahvaz	7	(0)
2009–2011	Tractor Sazi	38	(0)
2011–2013	Mes Sarcheshmeh	31	(2)
2012–2013	→ Fajr Sepasi (loan)	30	(5)
2013–2015	Mes Kerman	32	(0)
2015–2016	Gostaresh	16	(0)
Total		154	(7)
- * Club domestic league appearances and goals

Mojtaba Tarshiz (Persian: مجتبی ترشیز; 26 March 1978 – 8 January 2026) was an Iranian footballer who played in Iran's Premier Football League.

== Career ==
Tarshiz joined Tractor Sazi in 2009 after spending the previous two seasons at Esteghlal Ahvaz. He played as a midfielder.

== Death ==
Tarshiz was killed on 8 January 2026 by Islamic Republic forces during the 2026 Iran massacres amid the 2025–2026 Iranian protests. He was shot after shielding his wife, Arezou Madani, with his body when security forces opened fire on protesters in Andisheh, west of Tehran province. He was struck by gun shot, and both he and his wife reportedly died, with some reports suggesting his wife lived despite serious injuries.

Tarshiz was buried in Karaj on 12 January in a ceremony held without public announcements or media coverage. The couple were survived by their two daughters.
