= Ahmad Alenemeh =

Iranian football player

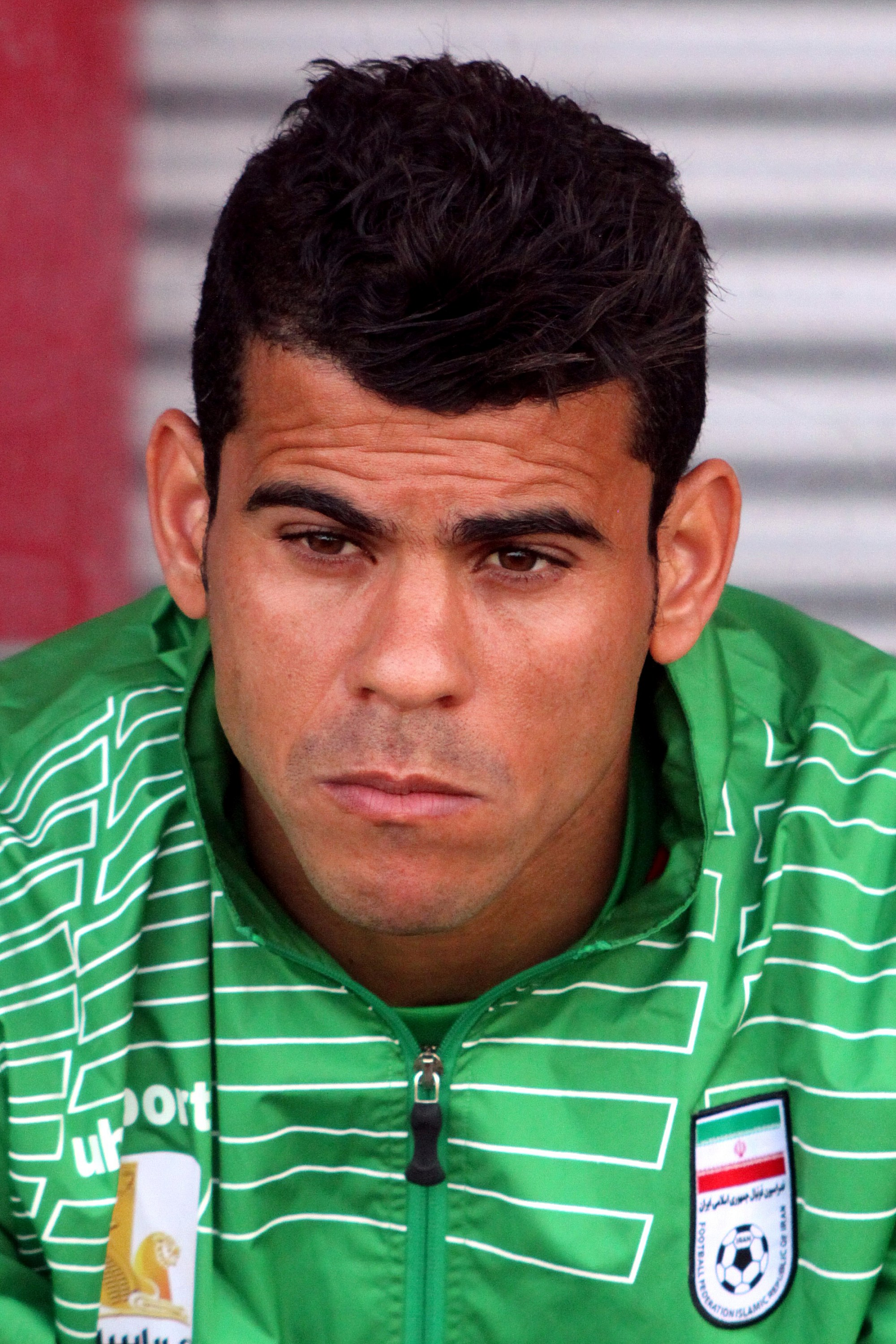
- Alenemeh with Iran in 2014

Personal information
- Full name: Seyed Ahmad Alenemeh
- Date of birth: 20 October 1982 (age 44)
- Place of birth: Ahvaz, Iran
- Height: 1.89 m (6 ft 2 in)
- Position: Defender

Team information
- Current team: Foolad (assistant manager)

Youth career
- 2001–2003: Foolad

Senior career*
| Years | Team | Apps | (Gls) |
| 2003–2004 | Niroye Zamini | | (0) |
| 2004–2007 | Esteghlal Ahvaz | 62 | (4) |
| 2007–2009 | Foolad | 52 | (9) |
| 2009–2010 | Sepahan | 25 | (2) |
| 2010–2011 | Shahin | 27 | (0) |
| 2011–2012 | Tractor | 19 | (1) |
| 2012–2014 | Naft Tehran | 54 | (4) |
| 2014–2015 | Tractor | 12 | (0) |
| 2015 | Foolad | 13 | (2) |
| 2016 | Padideh | 11 | (0) |
| 2016–2018 | Naft Tehran | 27 | (1) |
| 2018–2020 | Esteghlal Khuzestan | 14 | (0) |

International career
| 2007–2014 | Iran | 9 | (1) |

Managerial career
- 2021–2022: Esteghlal Khuzestan (assistant)
- 2023–2024: Foolad (assistant)
- 2024: Foolad
- 2024–: Foolad (assistant)
- * Club domestic league appearances and goals

Seyed Ahmad Alenemeh (Persian: احمد آل نعمه; born 20 October 1982) is an Iranian professional football coach and a former player who played as a defender. He is an assistant manager of Foolad.

== Club career ==
Alenemeh moved to Sepahan for the 2009–10 season, where he played as the club's main left-back. He moved to Shahin Bushehr the season after, and stayed there for a season before joining Tractor, where he help the club finish in second place. In the summer of 2012, Alenemeh joined Naft Tehran. In 2014 Alenemeh led Naft to a third place league finish and an Asian Champions League qualification.

On 14 July 2014, Alenemeh returned to Tractor, signing a contract until 2019.

== International career ==
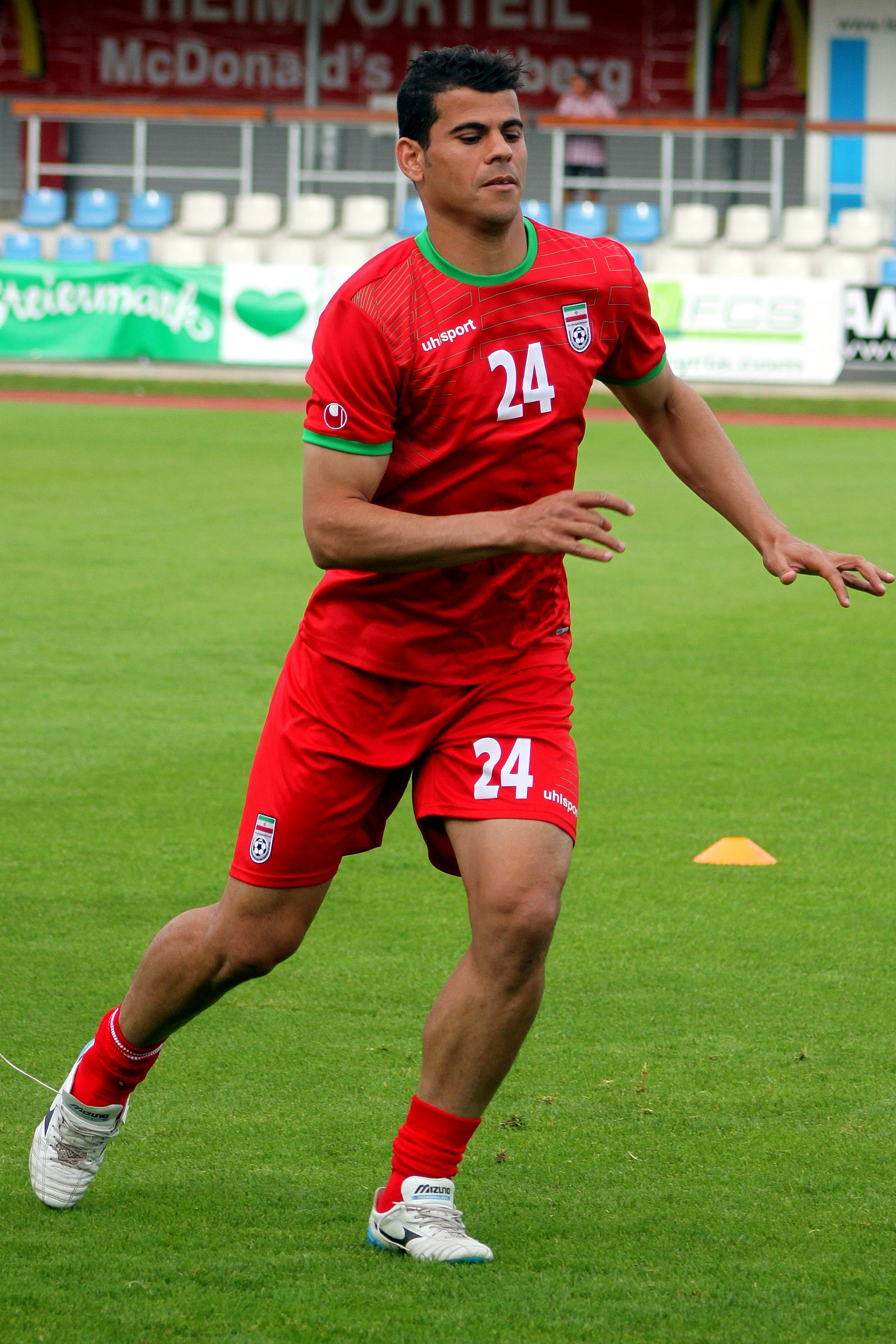
Alenemeh before Iran's match against Montenegro, 26 May 2014

Alenemeh began his international career after being called up to the Iran national football team for the 2008 West Asian Football Federation Championship.

After being absent from the national team for a period, he was recalled in 2014 and appeared in friendly matches and 2015 AFC Asian Cup qualification matches. On 1 June 2014, he was called up by manager Carlos Queiroz to Iran's squad for the 2014 FIFA World Cup. At the time, he was playing for Naft Tehran.

Alenemeh was included in Iran's matchday squad for all three of the team's group-stage matches at the 2014 FIFA World Cup, but did not make an appearance in any of them.

== Career statistics ==
=== Club ===
Last Update: 22 October 2014

| Club performance | | | League | | Cup | | Continental | | Total | |
| Season | Club | League | Apps | Goals | Apps | Goals | Apps | Goals | Apps | Goals |
| Iran | | | League | | Hazfi Cup | | Asia | | Total | |
|---|---|---|---|---|---|---|---|---|---|---|
| 2004–05 | Esteghlal Ahvaz | Pro League | 22 | 2 | 1 | 0 | - | - | 23 | 2 |
| 2005–06 | Esteghlal Ahvaz | Pro League | 24 | 2 | 0 | 0 | - | - | 24 | 3 |
| 2006–07 | Esteghlal Ahvaz | Pro League | 16 | 0 | 0 | 0 | - | - | 16 | 0 |
| 2007–08 | Foolad | Division 1 | 20 | 4 | 5 | 1 | - | - | 25 | 5 |
| 2008–09 | Foolad | Pro League | 32 | 5 | 3 | 0 | - | - | 35 | 5 |
| 2009–10 | Sepahan | Pro League | 25 | 2 | 1 | 0 | 3 | 0 | 29 | 2 |
| 2010–11 | Shahin | Pro League | 27 | 0 | 1 | 0 | - | - | 28 | 0 |
| 2011–12 | Tractor | Pro League | 19 | 1 | 0 | 0 | - | - | 19 | 1 |
| 2012–13 | Naft Tehran | Pro League | 30 | 3 | 0 | 0 | - | - | 30 | 3 |
| 2013–14 | Naft Tehran | Pro League | 24 | 1 | 1 | 0 | - | - | 25 | 1 |
| 2014–15 | Tractor | Pro League | 11 | 0 | 0 | 0 | 0 | 0 | 11 | 0 |
| 2014–15 | Foolad | Pro League | 13 | 2 | 0 | 0 | 6 | 0 | 19 | 2 |
| 2015–16 | Padideh | Pro League | 11 | 0 | 0 | 0 | - | - | 11 | 0 |
| 2016–17 | Naft Tehran | Pro League | 27 | 1 | 1 | 0 | - | - | 28 | 1 |
| 2017–18 | Esteghlal Khuzestan | Pro League | 8 | 0 | 0 | 0 | - | - | 8 | 0 |
| 2018–19 | Esteghlal Khuzestan | Pro League | 6 | 0 | 0 | 0 | - | - | 6 | 0 |
| Career total | | | 315 | 23 | 12 | 1 | 9 | 0 | 336 | 24 |

=== International ===
Scores and results list Iran's goal tally first, score column indicates score after each Alenemeh goal.

List of international goals scored by Ahmad Alenemeh
| No. | Date | Venue | Opponent | Score | Result | Competition | Ref. |
|---|---|---|---|---|---|---|---|
| 1 | 11 August 2008 | Takhti Stadium, Tehran | Qatar | 2–0 | 6–1 | 2008 WAFF Championship | |

== Honours ==
=== Club ===
Sepahan

- Iran Pro League: 2009–10

Naft Tehran

- Hazfi Cup: 2016–17

=== Country ===
Iran

- WAFF Championship: 2008
