= Hamid Jokar =

Iranian footballer (born 1987)

Personal information
- Full name: Hamid Jokar
- Date of birth: March 26, 1987 (age 39)
- Place of birth: Iran
- Position: Left back

Team information
- Current team: Fajr Sepasi

Senior career*
Years	Team	Apps	(Gls)
2010–2014	Fajr Sepasi	70	(6)
2014–2015	Gostaresh Foolad	8	(0)
2015	Fajr Sepasi	11	(0)
2015–2016	Nassaji		
2016–	Fajr Sepasi		
- * Club domestic league appearances and goals as of 25 April 2015

Hamid Jokar (Persian: حمید جوکار; born Match 26, 1987) is an Iranian football forward who currently plays for Fajr Sepasi.

== Career ==
Jokar started his career with Fajr Sepasi in 2010. He moved to Gostaresh Foolad in the summer of 2014.
