= Diego Máximo =

Brazilian footballer (born 1986)

Personal information
- Full name: Diego Benedito Galvão Máximo
- Date of birth: 22 April 1986 (age 40)
- Place of birth: Brazil
- Height: 1.93 m (6 ft 4 in)
- Position: Defender

Senior career*
Years	Team	Apps	(Gls)
2006	Guaratinguetá Futebol		
2007	Pogoń Szczecin	10	(0)
2008–2009	Payam Khorasan	20	(0)
2009–2011	Esteghlal Ahvaz	42	(0)
2011–2012	Iranjavan	20	(1)
2012–2013	Fajr Sepasi	13	(1)
2013–2014	Paykan	1	(0)
2014	Ballenas Galeana	0	(0)
2014–2015	Pazarcıkspor	1	(0)
2015	Tarxien Rainbows		
2016	Estanciano	1	(0)
2016–2017	Amicale		
2017	→ Rewa (loan)		
2017–2018	Marist		
2018	Rewa	2	(0)
2019	Erakor Golden Star		
2020	ABM Galaxy		
- * Club domestic league appearances and goals

Diego Benedito Galvão Máximo (born 22 April 1986) is a Brazilian former professional footballer who played as a defender.

== Club career ==
Diego Máximo had a spell with Pogoń Szczecin in the Polish Ekstraklasa during 2007.

He moved to Payam for 2008–09 season where he had good performances but, because of the relegation of the team, he moved to Esteghlal Ahvaz in the Summer of 2009 where his team was relegated again.

=== Club Career Statistics ===
Last Update 11 December 2012

Club performance			League	
Season	Club	League	Apps	Goals
Poland			League	
2006–07	Pogoń Szczecin	Ekstraklasa	10	0
Iran			League	
2008–09	Payam	Pro League	20	0
2009–10	Esteghlal Ahvaz	Pro League	26	0
2010–11	Esteghlal Ahvaz	Division 1	16	0
2011–12	Iranjavan	Division 1	20	1
2012–13	Fajr Sepasi	Pro League	15	0
2012–13	Paykan	Pro League	0	0
Total			107	2
