= Babak Latifi =

Iranian footballer

Personal information
- Full name: Babak Latifi
- Date of birth: September 14, 1987 (age 39)
- Place of birth: Iran
- Height: 1.90 m (6 ft 3 in)
- Position: Striker

Team information
- Current team: golreyhon

Youth career
- 2005–2009: Zob Ahan
- 2010–2011: Steel Azin

Senior career*
Years	Team	Apps	(Gls)
2008–2009	Zob Ahan	30	(15)
2010–2011	Steel Azin	18	(9)
2011–2012	Shahin Bushehr	19	(6)
2012	Fajr Sepasi	11	(6)
2013	Saipa	10	(5)
2013–2014	Paykan	10	(5)
2016–2017	Iranjavan	18	(8)
- * Club domestic league appearances and goals

Babak Latifi (Persian: بابک لطیفی) (born September 14, 1987) is an Iranian former footballer who played as a forward.

== Career ==
Latifi joined Fajr Sepasi after spending the previous season at Shahin.

=== Club career statistics ===
As of 11 May 2012

Club performance			League		Cup		Continental		Total	
Season	Club	League	Apps	Goals	Apps	Goals	Apps	Goals	Apps	Goals
Iran			League		Hazfi Cup		Asia		Total	
2008–09	Zob Ahan	Pro League	0	0			–			
2010–11	Steel Azin	Pro League	14	1			–			
2011–12	Shahin	Pro League	9	3			–			
2012–13	Fajr Sepasi	Pro League	0	0	0	0	–		0	0
Career total			23	4			0	0		
