= Mohsen Hosseini =

Iranian footballer

Personal information
- Full name: Seyed Mohsen Hosseini
- Date of birth: 9 February 1985 (age 41)
- Place of birth: Tehran
- Height: 1.87 m (6 ft 1 1/2 in)
- Position: Defender

Senior career*
Years	Team	Apps	(Gls)
	Tractor Sazi	52	(7)
2014	Gostaresh Foulad	13	(0)
2014–2015	Nassaji Mazandaran	9	(1)
2015–	Gostaresh Foulad	27	(2)
- * Club domestic league appearances and goals

Mohsen Hosseini (born February 9, 1985) is an Iranian football defender who plays for Gostaresh Foulad in the Persian Gulf Pro League.
