= Saeed Ghezelagchi =

Iranian footballer

Personal information
- Full name: Saeed Ghezelagchi
- Date of birth: March 6, 1983 (age 43)
- Place of birth: Tehran, Iran
- Position: Defender

Senior career*
| Years | Team | Apps | (Gls) |
- Mashin Sazi
| 2008–2009 | Tarbiat | | |
| 2009–2011 | Saipa | 46 | (5) |
| 2011–2014 | Fajr Sepasi | 97 | (1) |
| 2014–2015 | Naft Tehran | 0 | (5) |
| 2015 | Padideh | 6 | (0) |
| 2015–2016 | Esteghlal Ahvaz | 8 | (0) |
| 2016 | Paykan | | |
| 2016–2017 | Iranjavan Bushehr | | |
- * Club domestic league appearances and goals as of 30 December 2015 ‡ National team caps and goals as of 6 January 2010

Saeed Ghezelagchi (born March 6, 1983) is an Iranian football player who currently plays for Paykan of the Iran Pro League.

== Professional ==
Ghezelagchi has played for Saipa since 2009.

| Club performance | | | League | |
| Season | Club | League | Apps | Goals |
| Iran | | | League | |
|---|---|---|---|---|
| 2009–10 | Saipa | Pro League | 2 | 0 |
| 2010–11 | Saipa | Pro League | 11 | 0 |
| 2011–12 | Fajr Sepasi | Pro League | 13 | 0 |
| 2012–13 | Fajr Sepasi | Pro League | 31 | 1 |
| 2013–14 | Fajr Sepasi | Pro League | 24 | 0 |
| 2014–15 | Padideh | Pro League | 3 | 0 |
| Career total | | | 84 | 1 |
