= Léo Pimenta =

Brazilian footballer

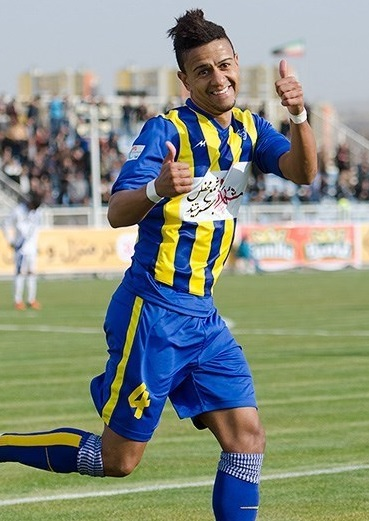
- Pimenta with Gostaresh Foulad

Personal information
- Full name: Leonardo André Pimenta Faria
- Date of birth: November 18, 1982 (age 43)
- Place of birth: Rio de Janeiro, Brazil
- Height: 1.78 m (5 ft 10 in)
- Position: Attacking midfielder

Team information
- Current team: Olaria

Senior career*
Years	Team	Apps	(Gls)
2000–2003	Vilanovense	56	(18)
2003–2004	Porto B	24	(7)
2004–2005	FC Marco	24	(9)
2005–2007	Vitória B	27	(9)
2007	Boavista	9	(2)
2007–2008	Sanat Naft	30	(12)
2008–2009	Hatta Club	28	(19)
2009–2011	Tractor Sazi	52	(6)
2010	→ Boavista (loan)	27	(4)
2011	Duque de Caxias	13	(0)
2011–2013	Boavista	17	(6)
2013–2014	Al Khaleej	20	(8)
2014–2016	Gostaresh Foulad	27	(6)
2017	Al Hamriyah		
2017–2018	Boavista	2	(0)
2018	Audax Rio		
2019	Angra dos Reis		
2019	Boavista	0	(0)
2020	Bangu	1	(0)
2021	Al-Mujazzal		
2022–	Olaria	3	(0)
- * Club domestic league appearances and goals as of 13:13, 6 June 2022 (UTC)

Leonardo "Léo" André Pimenta Faria (born November 18, 1982) is a Brazilian footballer, who plays as a midfielder for Olaria.

== Career ==
Pimenta joined Sanat Naft in summer 2007 and had a very good season but after the relegation of the team he had to leave the club. In 2009, he returned to Iran and signed for Tractor Sazi. He was loaned out to Boavista Sport Club in 2010.

He returned to Tabriz in 2014 and a one–year deal with Gostaresh Foolad. His contract expired in the summer of 2015, but he later re–signed with the club in winter of 2016. On 4 March 2016 Pimenta scored a brace against Esteghlal Ahvaz in a 4–0 victory.

== Career statistics ==
Club performance			League		Cup		Continental		Total	
Season	Club	League	Apps	Goals	Apps	Goals	Apps	Goals	Apps	Goals
Iran			League		Hazfi Cup		Asia		Total	
2007–08	Sanat Naft	Iran Pro League	30	12			-	-		
2009–10	Tractor Sazi	Iran Pro League	17	1	0	0	-	-	17	1
2010–11	Tractor Sazi	Iran Pro League	5	1	1	0	-	-	6	1
Total	Iran		52	13			0	0		
Career total			52	13			0	0		
