= Reza Haghighi =

Iranian footballer (born 1989)

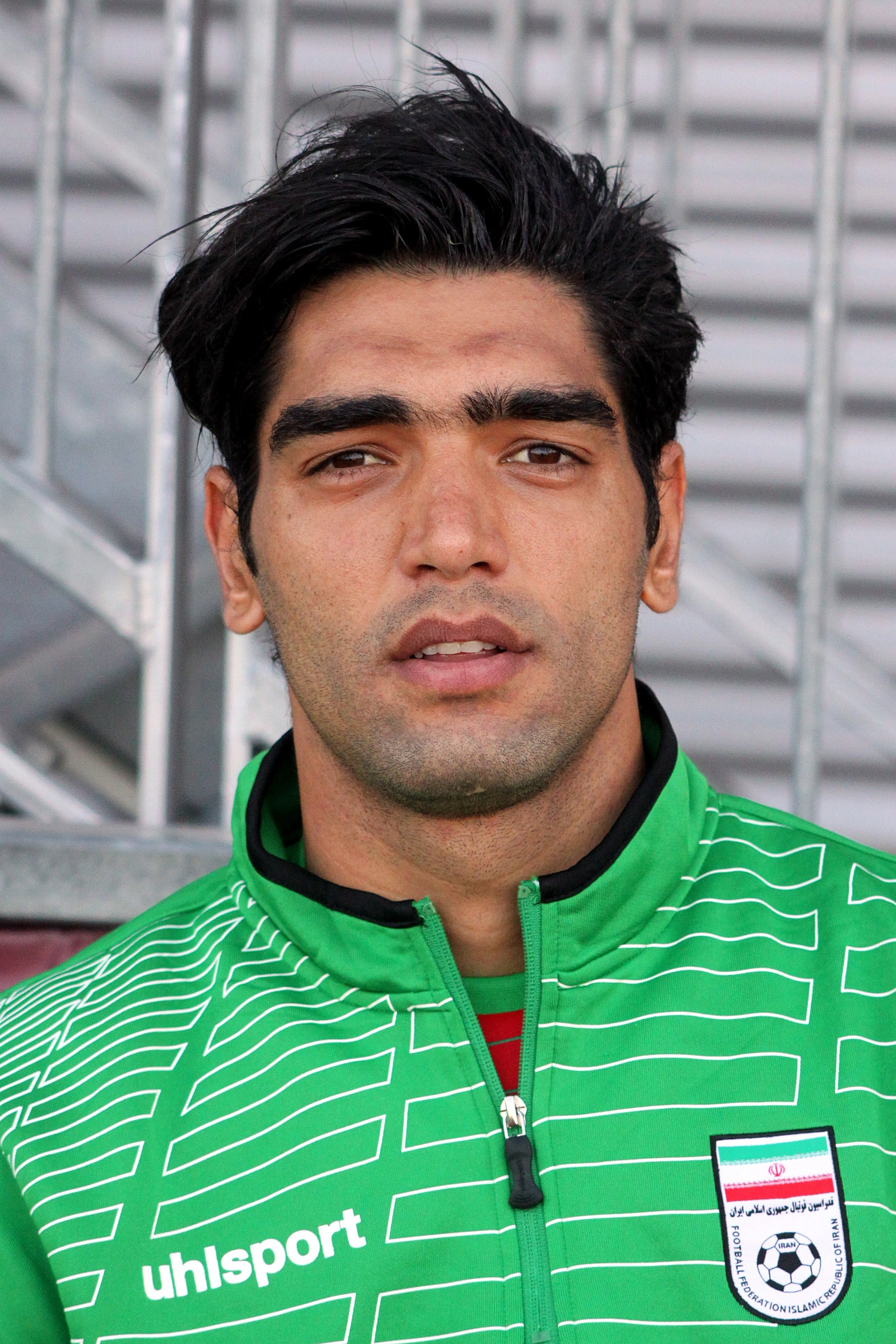
- Haghighi with Iran in 2014

Personal information
- Full name: Reza Haghighi Shandiz
- Date of birth: 1 February 1989 (age 37)
- Place of birth: Mashhad, Iran
- Height: 1.90 m (6 ft 3 in)
- Positions: Centre-back; defensive midfielder

Youth career
- Payam

Senior career*
Years	Team	Apps	(Gls)
2006–2009	Payam	48	(1)
2009–2012	Fajr Sepasi	76	(6)
2012–2015	Persepolis	68	(5)
2015	Padideh	23	(1)
2015–2016	Saba Qom	6	(0)
2016	Suphanburi	1	(0)
2016–2017	Padideh	5	(0)
2017–2018	Shahrdari Mahshahr	4	(0)
2023–2024	Sefid Jamegan	6	(0)
Total		237	(13)

International career
2012–2014	Iran	8	(0)
- * Club domestic league appearances and goals

Reza Haghighi (Persian: رضا حقیقی; born 1 February 1989) is an Iranian former professional footballer who played as a defender.

== Club career ==
=== Payam ===
Haghighi started his career with Payam. He made his debut for Payam on 10 November 2006 while he has 16 years old.

=== Fajr Sepasi ===
He joined Fajr Sepasi in the summer of 2009. He was chosen by Mahmoud Yavari as the club Captain before the starting of the 12th Iran Pro League. As of August 2012, he was named the Asian Best player of month by Goal.com Asia.

=== Persepolis ===
In the summer of 2012, Persepolis tried to acquire Haghighi but Fajr Sepasi rejected Persepolis's undisclosed bid (reported €220,000) and he had to stay at Fajr Sepasi. Ultimately, during the mid-season transfer window of the 12th Iran Pro League, the two teams reached an agreement on his transfer terms and Haghighi joined Persepolis on 21 November 2012. He signed a 2.5 year contract until the end of the 2014–15 season. He made his debut for Persepolis in a 6–0 win against Malavan in the 2012–13 Hazfi Cup Round of 32. He scored his first goal for Persepolis from a penalty kick in a match against Saipa on 28 February 2013. On 27 December 2014 he was officially released from Persepolis. He finished his career in Persepolis with 61 appearances and 3 goals.

=== Padideh ===
Haghighi joined Padideh in December 2014 with a contract until the end of season.

=== Saba Qom ===
Haghighi joined Saba Qom in the summer of 2015 with a two–year contract. He was released before mid season having only played six matches for the club.

=== Suphanburi ===
In January 2016 Haghighi signed a contract with Thai Premier League club Suphanburi. He played in a preseason game against Albirex Niigata for just 45 minutes, before the contract was canceled shortly before the season opening.

=== Return to Padideh ===
On 11 October 2016, Haghighi returned to Padideh by signing a seven-month contract.

== International career ==
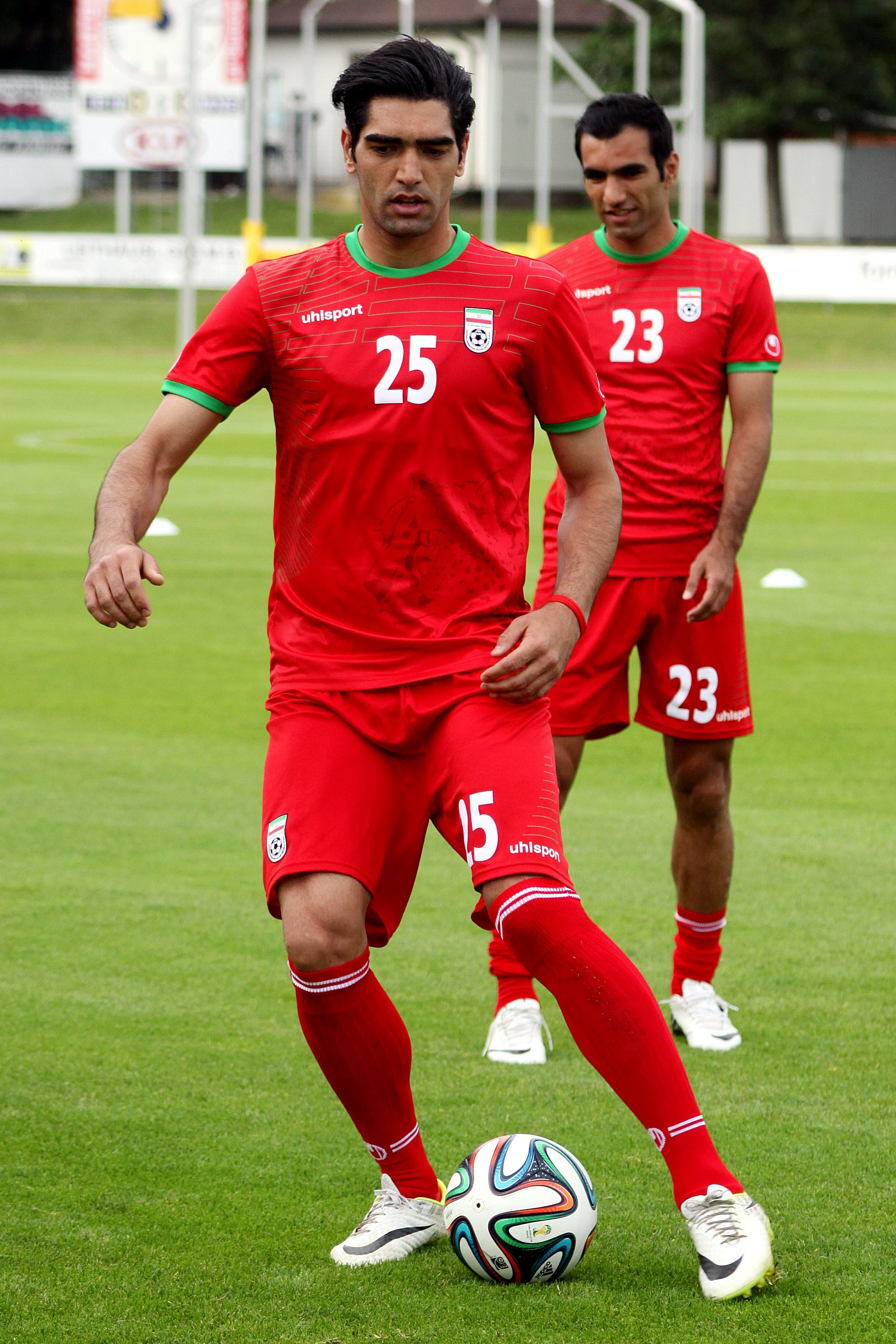
Reza Haghighi in a friendly match vs. Montenegro in 2014

On 12 February 2012, he was named in the Iran squad by Carlos Queiroz and made his debut in a match against Jordan on 23 February 2012. On 1 June 2014, he was called into Iran's 2014 FIFA World Cup squad by Queiroz.

== Career statistics ==
As of 20 May 2015

Club	Division	Season	League		Hazfi Cup		Asia		Total	
Club	Division	Season	Apps	Goals	Apps	Goals	Apps	Goals	Apps	Goals
Payam	Division 1	2006–07	6	0	0	0	–	–	6	0
Payam	Division 1	2007–08	21	0	3	0	–	–	24	0
Payam	Pro League	2008–09	21	1	1	0	–	–	22	1
Fajr Sepasi	Pro League	2009–10	11	0	0	0	–	–	11	0
Fajr Sepasi	Division 1	2010–11	23	4	2	0	–	–	25	4
Fajr Sepasi	Pro League	2011–12	32	1	0	0	–	–	32	1
Fajr Sepasi	Pro League	2012–13	10	1	0	0	–	–	10	1
Persepolis	Pro League	2012–13	13	2	4	0	–	–	17	2
Persepolis	Pro League	2013–14	26	0	2	2	–	–	28	2
Persepolis	Pro League	2014–15	14	0	2	0	0	0	16	0
Padideh	Pro League	2014–15	7	1	0	0	–	–	7	1
Career Total			177	9	14	1	0	0	191	12

== Honours ==
Payam

- Azadegan League : Champion 2007–08

Persepolis

- Iran Pro League runner-up: 2013–14
- Iranian Hazfi Cup runner-up: 2012–13
