= Mostafa Ekrami =

Iranian footballer (born 1983)

Personal information
- Full name: Mostafa Ekrami Kivaj
- Date of birth: 21 June 1983 (age 43)
- Place of birth: Tehran, Iran
- Position: Defender

Team information
- Current team: Oxin
- Number: 16

Youth career
- 1997–2002: Bank Melli

Senior career*
Years	Team	Apps	(Gls)
2002–2004	Bank Melli		
2004–2005	Esteghlal		
2005–2006	Payam Mashhad		
2006–2007	Shirin Faraz		
2007–2008	Esteghlal Ahvaz	1	(0)
2008–2013	Tractor Sazi	132	(3)
2013–2014	Zob Ahan	5	(0)
2014–2017	Gostaresh	73	(0)
2014	→ Mes Kerman (loan)	7	(0)
- * Club domestic league appearances and goals as of 27 December 2014

Mostafa Ekrami (born June 21, 1983) is an Iranian footballer. He currently plays for Gostaresh.

== Club career ==
He is a native of Sarab, East Azerbaijan, unless being born in Tehran. Ekrami joined Tractor Sazi from Esteghlal Ahvaz in the summer of 2008. He played five seasons for the club.

=== Club career statistics ===
As of 27 December 2014

Club performance			League		Cup		Continental		Total	
Season	Club	League	Apps	Goals	Apps	Goals	Apps	Goals	Apps	Goals
Iran			League		Hazfi Cup		Asia		Total	
2007–08	Esteghlal Ahvaz	Pro League	1	0			–	–		
2008–09	Tractor Sazi	Division 1		1			–	–		
2009–10	Tractor Sazi	Pro League	32	1			–	–		
2010–11	Tractor Sazi	Pro League	32	1	1	0	–	–	33	1
2011–12	Tractor Sazi	Pro League	18	0	0	0	–	–	18	0
2012–13	Tractor Sazi	Pro League	30	1	1	0	2	0	33	1
2013–14	Zob Ahan	Pro League	5	0	1	0	–	–	6	0
2013–14	Gostaresh Foulad	Pro League	14	0	0	0	–	–	14	0
2014–15	Mes Kerman	Division 1	7	0	0	0	–	–	7	0
2014–15	Gostaresh Foulad	Pro League	0	0	0	0	–	–	0	0
Career total				3			2	0		

- Assist Goals

Season	Team	Assists
2009–10	Tractor Sazi	2
2010–11	Tractor Sazi	0
2013–14	Gostaresh Foulad	2

== Honours ==
Tractor Sazi

- Iran Pro League Runner-up: 2011–12, 2012–13
