= Ali Reza Latifi =

Iranian footballer

Personal information
- Full name: Ali Reza Latifi
- Date of birth: September 16, 1984 (age 42)
- Place of birth: Karaj, Iran
- Position: Left back

Senior career*
Years	Team	Apps	(Gls)
2007–2008	Aluminium Arak	?	(2)
2008–2010	Saba Battery Qom	31	(1)
2010–2012	Saipa	25	(0)
2012–2013	Fajr Sepasi	3	(0)
2013	Shahrdari Tabriz	0	(0)
2014–2016	Gostaresh	17	(0)
2016	Hormozgan	0	(0)
2016–2017	Rah Ahan	?	(?)
- * Club domestic league appearances and goals

Ali Reza Latifi (born September 16, 1984) is an Iranian former footballer.

== Club career ==
Latifi joined Saipa F.C. in 2010, after spending the previous two seasons at Saba Qom.

Club performance			League		Cup		Continental		Total	
Season	Club	League	Apps	Goals	Apps	Goals	Apps	Goals	Apps	Goals
Iran			League		Hazfi Cup		Asia		Total	
2007–08	Sanaye Arak	Division 1	?	2			-	-		
2008–09	Saba Qom	Pro League	5	1			-	-		
2009–10	Saba Qom	Pro League	26	0			-	-		
2010–11	Saipa	Pro League	19	0	0	0	-	-	19	0
2011–12	Saipa	Pro League	1	0	1	0	-	-	2	0
Career total				1			0	0		

- Assist Goals

Season	Team	Assists
10–11	Saipa	1
11-12	Saipa	0
