= Ali Molaei =

Iranian footballer

Personal information
- Full name: Ali Molaei
- Date of birth: 1984 (age 41–42)
- Place of birth: Ahvaz, Iran
- Position: Midfielder

Team information
- Current team: Fajr Sepasi

Senior career*
| Years | Team | Apps | (Gls) |
- Deihim Ahvaz
| 2006–2008 | Mes Kerman | 33 | (5) |
| 2008–2010 | Sepahan | 4 | (0) |
| 2010–2011 | Tractor Sazi | 2 | (0) |
| 2011 | → Gostaresh (loan) | 11 | (3) |
| 2011 | Mes Sarcheshmeh | 14 | (0) |
| 2012 | Saba Qom | 13 | (0) |
| 2012–2013 | Fajr Sepasi | 0 | (0) |
- * Club domestic league appearances and goals as of 7 July 2012

Ali Molaei (Persian: علی مولایی, born 1984) is an Iranian football midfielder who currently plays for Fajr Sepasi in Iran Pro League.

On January 1, 2008, Molaei was banned from playing professional football for two years for doping.

== Club career ==
He had two seasons with Mes, but the Iranian federation charged him with doping and banned him from playing for two years.

=== Club career statistics ===
As of July 7, 2012

| Club performance | | | League | | Cup | | Continental | | Total | |
| Season | Club | League | Apps | Goals | Apps | Goals | Apps | Goals | Apps | Goals |
| Iran | | | League | | Hazfi Cup | | Asia | | Total | |
|---|---|---|---|---|---|---|---|---|---|---|
| 2006–07 | Mes | Pro League | 21 | 2 | | | - | - | | |
| 2007–08 | Mes | Pro League | 12 | 3 | | | - | - | | |
| 2008–09 | Sepahan | Pro League | 0 | 0 | 0 | 0 | 0 | 0 | 0 | 0 |
| 2009–10 | Sepahan | Pro League | 4 | 0 | | | 1 | 0 | | |
| 2010–11 | Tractor Sazi | Pro League | 2 | 0 | 0 | 0 | - | - | 2 | 0 |
| 2010–11 | Gostaresh F. | Division 1 | 11 | 3 | 0 | 0 | - | - | 11 | 3 |
| 2011–12 | Mes SCH | Pro League | 14 | 0 | 1 | 0 | - | - | 15 | 0 |
| 2011–12 | Saba Qom | Pro League | 13 | 1 | 0 | 0 | - | - | 0 | 0 |
| 2012–13 | Fajr Sepasi | Pro League | 0 | 0 | 0 | 0 | - | - | 0 | 0 |
| Career total | | | 82 | 9 | | | 1 | 0 | | |

- Assist Goals

| Season | Team | Assists |
|---|---|---|
| 06–07 | Mes | 3 |
| 07–08 | Mes | 1 |
| 10–11 | Tractor Sazi | 0 |
| 11–12 | Mes SCH | 2 |
| 11–12 | Saba Qom | 1 |
| 12–13 | Fajr Sepasi | 0 |

== Honours ==
=== Club ===
- Iran's Premier Football League
  - Winner: 1
    - 2009/10 with Sepahan
