= Abbas Mohammadrezaei =

Iranian footballer (born 1982)

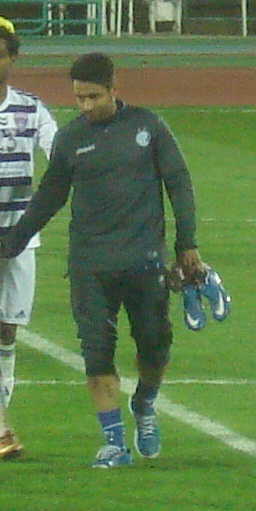

Personal information
- Full name: Abbas Mohammadrezaei
- Date of birth: 9 September 1982 (age 44)
- Place of birth: Tehran, Iran
- Position: Midfielder

Team information
- Current team: Khooneh be Khooneh

Senior career*
Years	Team	Apps	(Gls)
2008–2009	Mehrkam Pars		
2009–2010	Saba Qom	29	(10)
2010–2012	Saipa	52	(13)
2012–2013	Fajr Sepasi	14	(3)
2013	Esteghlal	12	(0)
2013–2014	Foolad	4	(0)
2014	Padideh	15	(0)
2015	Rah Ahan	12	(0)
2015–2016	Paykan	?	(?)
2016–	Khooneh be Khooneh	?	(?)
- * Club domestic league appearances and goals

Abbas Mohammadrezaei (born 9 September 1982) is an Iranian footballer who plays for Khooneh be Khooneh in the Azadegan League.

== Club career ==
Rezaei joined Saipa in 2010, after spending the previous season at Saba Qom.

Club performance			League		Cup		Continental		Total	
Season	Club	League	Apps	Goals	Apps	Goals	Apps	Goals	Apps	Goals
Iran			League		Hazfi Cup		Asia		Total	
2009–10	Saba Qom	Pro League	29	10	2	1	-	-	31	11
2010–11	Saipa	Pro League	28	8	1	0	-	-	29	8
2011–12	Saipa	Pro League	24	5	2	1	-	-	26	7
2012–13	Fajr Sepasi	Pro League	14	3	0	0	-	-	14	3
2012–13	Esteghlal	Pro League	12	0	4	0	0	0	16	0
2013–14	Foolad	Pro League	4	0	2	0	1	0	7	0
2014–15	Padideh	Pro League	15	0	0	0	-	-	2	0
Career total			118	26	9	2	1	0	128	28

- Assists

Season	Team	Assists
09–10	Saba Qom	4
10–11	Saipa	1
11–12	Saipa	4
12–13	Fajr Sepasi	2
12–13	Esteghlal	0
13–14	Foolad	0
14–15	Padideh	2

== Honours ==
Esteghlal

- Iran Pro League (1): 2012–13

Foolad

- Iran Pro League (1): 2013–14
