= 2015–16 Sepahan F.C. season =

Sepahan
2015–16 season
- Chairman: Asghar Bagherian
- Manager: (Iran) Hossein Faraki(until November 12, 2015) (Croatia) Igor Štimac
- Stadium: Foolad Shahr Stadium
- 15th Pro League: 11th
- 29th Hazfi Cup: 1/4
- 35th AFC Champions: Group stage
- Highest home attendance: 15,000; Sepahan-Persepolis (Pro League, 13 August 2015)
- Lowest home attendance: 800; Sepahan-Rah Ahan (Pro League, 13 December 2015)
Home colours	Away colours	Third colours

The 2015–16 season was Sepahan's 15th season in the Pro League, and their 22nd consecutive season in the top division of Iranian Football and 62nd year in existence as a football club. They competed in the Hazfi Cup and the AFC Champions League. Sepahan was captained by Moharram Navidkia.

== Players ==
Updated 4 June 2015.

=== First-team squad ===
Note: Flags indicate national team as defined under FIFA eligibility rules; some limited exceptions apply. Players may hold more than one non-FIFA nationality.

No.	Pos.	Nation	Player
1	GK	IRI	Rahman Ahmadi
2	DF	BRA	Leandro Padovani
3	DF	IRI	Habib Gordani
4	MF	IRI	Moharram Navidkia (captain)
6	MF	IRI	Milad Sarlak ^{U23}
7	MF	IRI	Hossein Papi
8	MF	IRI	Rasoul Navidkia
9	FW	IRI	Mohammad Reza Khalatbari
10	DF	IRI	Abdollah Karami
11	MF	IRI	Amin Jahan Alian
12	MF	IRI	Ali Karimi ^{U23}
14	FW	IRI	Vahid Najafi ^{U23}
15	DF	IRI	Ali Gholami ^{U23}
17	MF	BIH	Senijad Ibričić
18	MF	UZB	Fozil Musaev
21	DF	IRI	Vouria Ghafouri
22	GK	IRI	Farid Nejat ^{U21}

No.	Pos.	Nation	Player
24	MF	IRI	Armin Sohrabian ^{U21}
26	DF	IRI	Ali Ahmadi ^{U23}
27	GK	IRI	Mehdi Amini ^{U21}
29	FW	BRA	Luciano Pereira
33	DF	IRI	Saeed Ghaedifar
35	GK	IRI	Shahab Gordan
37	MF	IRI	Hossein Fazeli ^{U23}
39	DF	IRI	Mohammad Roshandel ^{U23}
47	DF	IRI	Hadi Aghili (vice-captain)
66	DF	IRI	Mohammad Ali Ahmadi
68	MF	IRI	Reza Asadi ^{U21}
70	MF	IRI	Hamed Bahiraei ^{U21}
74	FW	IRI	Amin Manouchehri
77	FW	IRI	Reza Mirzaei ^{U23}
80	MF	IRI	Ali Hazami ^{U23}
88	DF	IRI	Aref Gholami ^{U21}
99	FW	IRI	Mehdi Alimoradi ^{U21}

==== Loan list ====
Note: Flags indicate national team as defined under FIFA eligibility rules; some limited exceptions apply. Players may hold more than one non-FIFA nationality.

No.	Pos.	Nation	Player
99	MF	IRI	Amir Hossein Karimi (at Gostaresh)
26	GK	IRI	Mehdi Sedghian (at Fajr Sepasi)
3	DF	IRI	Shoja' Khalilzadeh (at Tractor Sazi)

No.	Pos.	Nation	Player
20	FW	IRI	Mehdi Sharifi (at Tractor Sazi)
40	DF	IRI	Ali Hamoudi (at Tractor Sazi)

For recent transfers, see List of Iranian football transfers winter 2015–16.

== Managerial staff ==
=== Current managerial staff ===
Position	Name
Head coach	(Croatia) Igor Štimac
Assistant coach	(Croatia) Ivo Šeparović
Assistant coach	(Iran) Majid Basirat
Assistant coach	(Iran) Qasem Zaghinejad
Goalkeepers coach	(Croatia) Zoran Varvodić
Fitness trainer	(Iran) Alireza Rabbani
Analyzer	(Iran) Manouchehr Rezaei
Doctor	(Iran) Mohammad Rashadi
Doctor assistant	(Iran) Asghar Majidikia
Physiotherapist	(Iran) Ali Khorami
Massager	(Iran) Hossein Afshardoost
Massager	(Iran) Majid Fazlollahi
Massager	(Iran) Hamed Bateni
Administrative manager	(Iran) Reza Fatahi
Executive manager	(Iran) Rasoul Khorvash

== Sponsorship ==
Period	Kit manufacturer	Sponsor
2015–16	Joma	Mobarakeh Steel Company

== Matches ==
=== Pro league ===
Win Draw Loss Postponed

Date Round	Home	Score	Away	Location

30 July 2015 1	Sepahan	1–0	Esteghlal Khuzestan	Isfahan
19:35 UTC+03:30	Aghily (yellow card) 60'; Sharifi 65'; Khalatbari (yellow card) 78'	Report	(yellow card) 44'Khanifar; (yellow card) 50'Doraghi; (yellow card) 78'Seifollahi; (yellow card) 88'Zohaivi	Stadium: Fooladshahr Stadium; Attendance: 8,000; Referee: Hassan Akrami

7 August 2015 2	Zob Ahan	0–1	Sepahan	Isfahan
21:00 UTC+03:30		Report	65'Karimi	Stadium: Fooladshahr Stadium; Attendance: 10,000; Referee: Mohsen Ghahremani

13 August 2015 3	Sepahan	4–2	Persepolis	Isfahan
19:30 UTC+03:30	Hajsafi 8'; Karimi (yellow card) 35'; Aghily 57' (pen.); Karami (yellow card) 63'; Khalatbari 81'	Report	(yellow card) 9'Alipour; 12'Taremi; 33'Alishah; (yellow card) 35'Kamyabinia; 39' (o.g.)Umaña; (yellow card) 56'Kafshgari; (yellow card) 70'Ansari; (yellow card) 87'Alishah	Stadium: Fooladshahr Stadium; Attendance: 15,000; Referee: Hassan Zargar

19 August 2015 4	Sepahan	1–1	Foolad	Isfahan
19:35 UTC+03:30	Vouria (yellow card) 11'; Karami 67'	Report	(yellow card) 6'Aghilinejan; 32'Aghaei	Stadium: Fooladshahr Stadium; Attendance: 2,000; Referee: Mohsen Torky

25 August 2015 5	Saipa	0–2	Sepahan	Tehran
21:00 UTC+03:30	Ebrahimzadeh (yellow card) 77'	Report	(yellow card) 4'Khalatbari; 55' Hajsafi; (yellow card) 86'Sharifi; 90' Hajsafi; (yellow card) 91'Hajsafi	Stadium: Ekbatan; Attendance: 500; Referee: Alborz Hajipour

19 September 2015 6	Sepahan	0–0	Tractor Sazi	Isfahan
17:00 UTC+03:30		Report		Stadium: Fooladshahr Stadium; Attendance: 2,000; Referee: Afshin Khorshidi

24 September 2015 7	Saba	1–0	Sepahan	Qom
17:20 UTC+03:30	Alimohammadi 6'; Eslami (yellow card) 61'; Alimohammadi (yellow card) 84'	Report	(yellow card) 86'Sharifi	Stadium: Yadegar-e Emam; Attendance: 500; Referee: Payam Haydari

16 October 2015 8	Sepahan	1–1	Siah Jamegan	Isfahan
17:00 UTC+03:30	Gordan (yellow card) 14'; Sharifi 45'; Karami (yellow card) 68'	Report	(yellow card) 36'Sharbati; 58'Afshar; (yellow card) 66'da silva (yellow card) 74'Enayati; (yellow card) 93'Kamdar	Stadium: Fooladshahr Stadium; Attendance: 2,000; Referee: Reza Kermanshahi

20 October 2015 9	Malavan	0–0	Sepahan	Bandar-e Anzali
15:30 UTC+03:30	Yousefzadeh (yellow card) 84'	Report	(yellow card) 18'Gordani; (yellow card) 83'Karimi	Stadium: Takhti Stadium; Attendance: 2,270; Referee: Tooraj Haghverdi

26 October 2015 10	Sepahan	0–3	Esteghlal	Isfahan
15:00 UTC+03:30	Musaev (yellow card) 32'	Report	6'Esmaeili; 53'Ansari; 77'Barzay; (yellow card) 92'Ebrahimi	Stadium: Fooladshahr Stadium; Attendance: 10,000; Referee: Shahin Haji Babaei

31 October 2015 11	Esteghlal Ahvaz	1–1	Sepahan	Ahvaz
16:50 UTC+03:30	Ashoubi (yellow card) 29'; Majidi (yellow card) 38'; Ashoubi 80'	Report	24'Khalatbari; (yellow card) 55'Roshandel	Stadium: Takhti Stadium; Attendance: 500; Referee: Payam Heydari

20 November 2015 12	Sepahan	2–1	Naft Tehran	Isfahan
15:15 UTC+03:30	Gordani (yellow card) 33'; Sharifi 1+45'; Sarlak (yellow card) 86'; Aghily 90' (pen.); Karimi (yellow card) 4+90'	Report	(penalty missed) 31Bou Hamdan; 36'Ghorbani	Stadium: Fooladshahr Stadium; Attendance: 5,000; Referee: Alireza Faghani

29 November 2015 13	Gostaresh Foulad	1–0	Sepahan	Tabriz
15:00 UTC+03:30	Goudarzi 18'	Report	(yellow card) 34'Roshandel; (yellow card) 56'Aghily; (yellow card) 90+1'Karami	Stadium: Gostaresh Foulad Stadium

13 December 2015 14	Sepahan	0–0	Rah Ahan	Isfahan
15:15 UTC+03:30	Gordani (yellow card) 16'; Khalatbari (yellow card) 44'; Karami (yellow card) 82'	Report		Stadium: Fooladshahr Stadium; Attendance: 800; Referee: Mohammad Reza Faghani

18 December 2015 15	Padideh	1–1	Sepahan	Mashhad
14:45 UTC+03:30	Kheiri (yellow card) 54'; Abbasian 87'; Mardani (yellow card) 88'	Report	(yellow card) 33'Ahmadi; 45'Sharifi	Stadium: Samen Stadium; Referee: Reza Adel

26 December 2015 16	Esteghlal Khuzestan	1–1	Sepahan	Ahvaz
15:00 UTC+03:30	Zohaivi 58'; Zohaivi (yellow card) 89'	Report	(yellow card) 48'Ghafouri; 85'Khalatbari; (yellow card) 61'Aghily; (yellow card) 92'Ahmadi	Stadium: Ghadir Stadium; Referee: Mohsen Torky

31 December 2015 17	Sepahan	1–1	Zob Ahan	Isfahan
15:00 UTC+03:30	Khalatbari 41'; Karimi (yellow card) 50'; Fozil (yellow card) 60'; Karami (yellow card) 66'	Report	14'Pahlavan; (yellow card) 58'Mehdipour; (yellow card) 60'Hassanzadeh; (yellow card) 69'Pahlavan	Stadium: Fooladshahr Stadium; Attendance: 2,000; Referee: Hossein Zargar; Assistant referee: Sajad Touri, Mehdi Alighadr

2 February 2016 18	Persepolis	2–2	Sepahan	Tehran
17:00 UTC+03:30	Mosalman (yellow card) 25'; Alipour 48'; Kamyabinia 74'; Hatami (yellow card) 82'	Report	9'Fozil; (yellow card) 25'Chimba; (yellow card) 32'Karimi; 64'Chimba; (red card) 76'Pado	Stadium: Azadi Stadium; Attendance: 75,000; Referee: Bijan Haydari; Assistant referee: Mohammadreza Mansouri، Babak Davari

7 February 2016 19	Foolad	1–0	Sepahan	Ahvaz
15:00 UTC+03:30	Ahle Shakheh (yellow card) 70'; Ahle Shakheh 70'; Motlaghzadeh (yellow card) 81'	report	(yellow card) 38'Karami; (yellow card) 94'Fazeli	Stadium: Ghadir Stadium; Referee: Tooraj Haghverdi; Assistant referee: Ali Mirzabeygi، Farhad Moraveji; Fourth referee: Saeid Rahimi moghadam

12 February 2016 20	Sepahan	1–2	Saipa	Isfahan
15:00 UTC+03:30	Gordani (yellow card) 46'; Vouria (yellow card) 86'; Chimba 92'	Report	Meydavoudi 59'; Zeinali 77'	Stadium: Fooladshahr Stadium; Referee: Shahin Hajbabaei کمک‌ها: Hamid Ghamzeh، Mohammadreza Rousta داور چهارم: Hadi Haj Abbasi

18 February 2016 21	Tractor Sazi	2–1	Sepahan	Tabriz
15:15 UTC+03:30	Nong 28'; Aghaei (yellow card) 28'; Sharifi 94'		13'Rasoul; (yellow card) 58'Karami; (red card) 81'Fozil	Stadium: Yadegar-e Emam; Referee: Ashkan Khorshidi

6 March 2016 22	Sepahan	2–2	Saba	Isfahan
				Stadium: Fooladshahr Stadium

10 March 2016 23	Siah Jamegan	0–1	Sepahan

31 March 2016 24	Sepahan	2–2	Malavan	Isfahan
				Stadium: Fooladshahr Stadium

10 April 2016 25	Esteghlal	0–0	Sepahan

15 April 2016 26	Sepahan	1–1	Esteghlal Ahvaz	Isfahan
16:50				Stadium: Fooladshahr Stadium

24 April 2016 27	Naft Tehran	0–1	Sepahan

28 April 2016 28	Sepahan	2–1	Gostaresh Foulad	Isfahan
				Stadium: Fooladshahr Stadium

8 May 2016 29	Rah Ahan	1–0	Sepahan

13 May 2016 30	Sepahan	0–2	Padideh	Isfahan
				Stadium: Fooladshahr Stadium

=== Hazfi Cup ===
Win Draw Loss Postponed

11 September 2015 1/16	Sepahan F.C.	4–0	Abyek Qazvin F.C.	Esfahan
19:35	Papi 6'; Papi 38'; Khalatbari 65'; Jahan Alian 75'	Report		Stadium: Safaeieh

19 September 2015 1/8	Kara Shiraz F.C.	1–3	Sepahan F.C.	Shiraz
19:35	Cheraghi 53'	Report	Sharifi 11'; Sharifi 33'; Rasoul 1+90'	Stadium: Hafezieh

5 November 2015 1/4	Sepahan F.C.	2–0	Rah Ahan F.C.	Esfahan
15:00	Karimi 94'; Sharifi 111'	Report		Stadium: Foolad Shahr

24 November 2015 Semi-Final	Zob Ahan F.C.	2–2 (a.e.t.) (4–1 p)	Sepahan F.C.	Esfahan
14:30	Rezaei 2'; Hamam (yellow card) 22'; Tabrizi (yellow card) 32'; Ismail (yellow card) 77'; Hosseini 110'	Report	51'Vouria; (yellow card) 52'Vouria; (yellow card) 32' (yellow-red card) 84'Sarlak; (yellow card) 88' Khalatbari; (yellow card) 93'Gordani; 122'Vouria	Stadium: Foolad Shahr; Attendance: 5000; Referee: Mohsen Torky
	Penalties
	Rajabzadeh (penalty scored); Rezaei (penalty scored); Hassanzadeh (penalty scored); Mehdipour (penalty scored)		(penalty missed) Aghily; (penalty scored) Vouria; (penalty missed) Karimi

=== Friendly Matches ===
Win Draw Loss Postponed

Date Round	Home	Score	Away	Location

11 July 2015	(Turkey) Altınordu	3–3	Sepahan	Bolu, Turkey
18:30			Khalatbari; Sharifi; Hajsafi

15 July 2015	(Turkey) Mersin İdmanyurdu	0–2	Sepahan	Bolu, Turkey
19:30			Pereira; Sharifi

June 2015 3	Sepahan	1–2	Trinidad and Tobago	Bolu, Turkey
18:30	Khalatbari	report

24 July 2015 4	Sepahan	2–1	Rah Ahan F.C.	Esfahan
17:30	Khalatbari; Najafi	report	Mehrdad	Stadium: Ferdos

21 January 2016 5	Sepahan	2–1	Sumgayit FK	Antalya
18:30	Khalatbari; Fazeli	report		Stadium: Mardan Sports

24 January 2016 6	Sepahan	2–3	ASA Târgu Mureș	Antalya
18:30	Khalatbari; Chimba	report		Stadium: Mardan Sports

== Competitions ==
=== Overall ===
Competition	First match	Last match	Final position / round	Comments
Persian Gulf Pro League	30 July 2015	–	–	-
Hazfi Cup	11 September 2015	24 November 2015	Semi-Final	Failure of Zob Ahan F.C. on Penalty kick
AFC Champions League	–	–	-	-

=== Pro league ===
==== League table ====
Pos	Team	Pld	W	D	L	GF	GA	GD	Pts
9	Gostaresh	30	10	9	11	36	32	+4	39
10	Padideh	30	10	9	11	30	35	−5	39
11	Sepahan	30	8	14	8	29	30	−1	38
12	Foolad	30	9	8	13	26	37	−11	35
13	Siah Jamegan	30	7	6	17	23	34	−11	27

Updated to match(es) played on 13 May 2016. Source: IPL Stats
Rules for classification: 1) points; 2) goal difference; 3) number of goals scored.

==== Results summary ====
Overall								Home						Away					
Pld	W	D	L	GF	GA	GD	Pts	W	D	L	GF	GA	GD	W	D	L	GF	GA	GD
21	5	10	6	20	21	−1	25	3	4	2	10	10	0	2	6	4	10	11	−1

Source: Ipl Stats

==== Results by round ====
Round	1	2	3	4	5	6	7	8	9	10	11	12	13	14	15	16	17	18	19	20	21	22	23	24	25	26	27	28	29	30
Ground	H	A	H	A	A	H	A	H	A	H	A	H	A	H	A	A	H	A	A	H	A	H	A	H	A	H	A	H	A	H
Result	W	W	W	D	W	D	L	D	D	L	D	W	L	D	D	D	D	D	L	L	L	D	W	D	D	D	W	W	L	L
Position	2	2	1	1	1	2	2	2	2	4	6	4	7	7	9	8	9	10	10	10	11	11	11	11	11	11	11	9	10	11

Source: "Ipl".
A = Away; H = Home; W = Win; D = Draw; L = Loss

=== Goal scorers ===
Overall

Player	Goals
(Iran) Mehdi Sharifi	7
(Iran) Mohammad Reza Khalatbari	5
(Iran) Ehsan Hajsafi	3
(Iran) Hossein Papi	2
(Iran) Hadi Aghily	2
(Iran) Ali Karimi	2
(Iran) Vouria Ghafouri	2
(Brazil) Luciano Pereira Mendes	2
(Iran) Rasoul Navidkia	2
(Uzbekistan) Fozil Musaev	1
(Iran) Abdollah Karami	1
(Iran) Amin Jahan Alian	1

Pro League

Player	Goals
(Iran) Mehdi Sharifi	4
(Iran) Mohammad Reza Khalatbari	4
(Iran) Ehsan Hajsafi	3
(Iran) Hadi Aghily	2
(Brazil) Luciano Pereira Mendes	2
(Iran) Ali Karimi	1
(Iran) Abdollah Karami	1
(Uzbekistan) Fozil Musaev	1
(Iran) Rasoul Navidkia	1

Hazfi Cup

Player	Goals
(Iran) Mehdi Sharifi	3
(Iran) Hossein Papi	2
(Iran) Vouria Ghafouri	2
(Iran) Amin Jahan Alian	1
(Iran) Mohammad Reza Khalatbari	1
(Iran) Ali Karimi	1
(Iran) Rasoul Navidkia	1

Last update: 4 February 2016

=== Transfers ===
Last updated on 02 February 2016

==== Summer ====
In: Note: Flags indicate national team as defined under FIFA eligibility rules; some limited exceptions apply. Players may hold more than one non-FIFA nationality.

No.	Pos.	Nation	Player
2	MF	BRA	Leandro Padovani Celin (from Naft Tehran F.C.)
3	DF	IRI	Habib Gordani (from Tractor Sazi F.C.)

Out: Note: Flags indicate national team as defined under FIFA eligibility rules; some limited exceptions apply. Players may hold more than one non-FIFA nationality.

No.	Pos.	Nation	Player
99	MF	IRI	Amir Hossein Karimi (to Gostaresh Foulad F.C.)
18	DF	IRI	Mohammad Hossein Moradmand (to Padideh F.C.)
14	FW	ALB	Xhevahir Sukaj
28	MF	IRI	Ehsan Hajsafi (to FSV Frankfurt)

==== Winter ====
In: Note: Flags indicate national team as defined under FIFA eligibility rules; some limited exceptions apply. Players may hold more than one non-FIFA nationality.

No.	Pos.	Nation	Player
17	MF	BIH	Senijad Ibričić (from Karşıyaka S.K.)
80	MF	IRI	Ali Hazzami (from Foolad F.C.)
74	FW	IRI	Amin Manouchehri (from Rah Ahan F.C.)

Out: Note: Flags indicate national team as defined under FIFA eligibility rules; some limited exceptions apply. Players may hold more than one non-FIFA nationality.

No.	Pos.	Nation	Player
20	FW	IRI	Mehdi Sharifi ((Loan) to Tractor Sazi F.C.)

== See also ==
- 2015–16 Iran Pro League
- 2015–16 Hazfi Cup
