= 2014–15 Sepahan F.C. season =

Sepahan
2014–15 season
- Chairman: Mehrzad Khalilian
- Manager: Zlatko Kranjčar (until 5 September 2014); Hossein Faraki (from 9 September 2014)
- Stadium: Foolad Shahr Stadium
- Iran Pro League: 1st
- Hazfi Cup: Round of 32
- Top goalscorer: League: Mehdi Sharifi (5); All: Mehdi Sharifi (5)
- Highest home attendance: 13,500 (14 August 2014 against Esteghlal)
- Lowest home attendance: 2,000 (6 November 2014 against Naft Masjed Soleyman)
- Average home league attendance: 5,889
Home colours	Away colours	Third colours

The 2014–15 season was Sepahan's 14th season in the Pro League, and their 21st consecutive season in the top division of Iranian Football and 61st year in existence as a football club. They competed in the Hazfi Cup. Sepahan was captained by Moharram Navidkia.

== Players ==
Last updated on 22 November 2014

Under-23 players	Under-21 players

Out during the season (injured/ transferred)

No.	Name	Nationality	Position	Since	Date of birth (age)	Signed from	Appearance	Goal
Goalkeepers
1	Rahman Ahmadi	(Iran)	GK	2008	30 July 1980 (age 46)	Persepolis, Saipa	93	0
26	Mehdi Sedghian	(Iran)	GK	2014	5 May 1996 (age 30)	(Youth system)	0	0
27	Mehdi Amini	(Iran)	GK	2012	27 March 1996 (age 30)	(Youth system)	0	0
35	Shahab Gordan	(Iran)	GK	2013	22 May 1984 (age 42)	Persepolis	28	0
Defenders
5	Hadi Aghili	(Iran)	CB	2004	15 January 1981 (age 45)	Saipa, Qatar SC	219	19
6	Mohammad Ali Ahmadi	(Iran)	CB	2012	24 June 1983 (age 43)	Zob Ahan	57	0
10	Abdollah Karami	(Iran)	CB	2014	27 February 1983 (age 43)	Foolad	15	2
18	Mohammad Hossein Moradmand	(Iran)	CB	2012	22 June 1993 (age 33)	(Youth system)	11	0
19	Ali Gholami	(Iran)	CB	2013	3 May 1994 (age 32)	(Youth system)	0	0
21	Vouria Ghafouri	(Iran)	RB	2014	20 September 1987 (age 39)	Naft Tehran	14	2
24	Armin Sohrabian	(Iran)	LB	2013	26 July 1995 (age 31)	(Youth system)	0	0
25	Mohsen Aghaei	(Iran)	CB	2014	18 January 1995 (age 31)	(Youth system)	0	0
33	Saeed Ghaedifar	(Iran)	LB	2013	13 April 1992 (age 34)	(Youth system)	4	0
39	Mohammad Roshandel	(Iran)	RB	2013	2 July 1995 (age 31)	(Youth system)	0	0
Midfielders
4	Moharram Navidkia (captain)	(Iran)	AM	1998	1 November 1982 (age 44)	(Youth system), (Germany) Bochum	263	41
7	Hossein Papi	(Iran)	LM	2004	27 February 1985 (age 41)	(Youth system), Sepahan Novin	160	1
8	Rasoul Navidkia	(Iran)	AM	2014	21 December 1983 (age 42)	(Youth system), Naft Tehran	26	1
9	Mohammadreza Khalatbari	(Iran)	AM	2014	14 September 1983 (age 43)	(United Arab Emirates) Al Wasl, Persepolis	46	17
11	Amin Jahan Alian	(Iran)	RM	2012	16 June 1991 (age 35)	(Youth system)	33	4
12	Ali Karimi	(Iran)	DM	2012	11 February 1994 (age 32)	(Youth system)	23	2
15	Márcio Passos	(Brazil)	DM	2015	25 April 1985 (age 41)	(Brazil) América de Natal	0	0
17	Milad Sarlak	(Iran)	DM	2013	26 March 1995 (age 31)	(Youth system)	0	0
28	Ehsan Hajsafi	(Iran)	LM	2006	25 February 1990 (age 36)	(Youth system), Tractor Sazi	196	25
88	Fozil Musaev	(Uzbekistan)	DM	2015	2 January 1989 (age 37)	(Uzbekistan) Lokomotiv Tashkent	0	0
99	Amir Hossein Karimi	(Iran)	RM	2013	9 February 1996 (age 30)	(Youth system)	15	0
Forwards
14	Xhevahir Sukaj	(Albania)	CF	2012	5 October 1987 (age 39)	(Turkey) Gençlerbirliği	60	15
16	Erfan Maftoolkar	(Iran)	CF	2014	8 January 1994 (age 32)	(Youth system)	1	0
20	Mehdi Sharifi	(Iran)	CF	2012	16 August 1992 (age 34)	(Youth system)	30	13
29	Luciano Pereira	(Brazil)	CF	2014	15 October 1983 (age 43)	Foolad	15	4
37	Hossein Fazeli	(Iran)	CF	2014	11 June 1993 (age 33)	(Youth system), Fajr Sepasi	0	0
53	Mehdi Alimoradi	(Iran)	CF	2014	12 May 1996 (age 30)	(Youth system)	0	0

No.	Name	Nationality	Position	Since	Date of birth (age)	Signed from	Appearance	Goal
3	Shoja' Khalilzadeh	(Iran)	CB	2013	14 May 1989 (age 37)	Mes Kerman	35	0
40	Ali Hamoudi	(Iran)	RB	2013	21 March 1986 (age 40)	Esteghlal	32	1

== Transfers ==
Last updated on 12 July 2014

=== Summer ===
In: Note: Flags indicate national team as defined under FIFA eligibility rules; some limited exceptions apply. Players may hold more than one non-FIFA nationality.

No.	Pos.	Nation	Player
8	MF	IRI	Rasoul Navidkia (from Naft Tehran)
9	MF	IRI	Mohammadreza Khalatbari (from Persepolis)
10	DF	IRI	Abdollah Karami (from Foolad)
16	FW	IRI	Erfan Maftoolkar (from Sepahan U21)
21	MF	IRI	Vouria Ghafouri (from Naft Tehran)
25	DF	IRI	Mohsen Aghaei (from Sepahan U21)
26	GK	IRI	Mehdi Sedghian (from Sepahan U21)
29	FW	BRA	Luciano Pereira (from Foolad)
37	FW	IRI	Hossein Fazeli (from Fajr Sepasi)
53	FW	IRI	Mehdi Alimoradi (from Sepahan U21)

Out: Note: Flags indicate national team as defined under FIFA eligibility rules; some limited exceptions apply. Players may hold more than one non-FIFA nationality.

No.	Pos.	Nation	Player
9	FW	IRI	Mohammad Gholami (to Rah Ahan)
11	DF	IRI	Mohsen Irannejad (to Rah Ahan, previously on loan at ZobAhan)
15	MF	IRI	Omid Ebrahimi (to Esteghlal)
16	FW	IDN	Sergio van Dijk (to (Thailand) Suphanburi)
26	FW	IRI	Ali Choupani (On Loan at Padideh)
30	DF	IRI	Ahmad Eskandari (to Padideh)
30	GK	IRI	Mohammad Nasseri (to Gostaresh, previously on loan)
32	MF	IRI	Hamid Reza Kazemi (to Saba Qom)
36	GK	IRI	Mohammad Mahmoudvand (Released)
38	MF	ALB	Ervin Bulku (to (Albania) Tirana)
45	MF	IRI	Ehsan Pahlavan (Loan Return to Zob Ahan)
88	MF	IRI	Yaghoub Karimi (on loan at Esteghlal)

=== Winter ===
In: Note: Flags indicate national team as defined under FIFA eligibility rules; some limited exceptions apply. Players may hold more than one non-FIFA nationality.

No.	Pos.	Nation	Player
15	MF	BRA	Márcio Passos (from (Brazil) América de Natal)
88	MF	UZB	Fozil Musaev (from (Uzbekistan) Lokomotiv Tashkent)

Out: Note: Flags indicate national team as defined under FIFA eligibility rules; some limited exceptions apply. Players may hold more than one non-FIFA nationality.

No.	Pos.	Nation	Player
40	DF	IRI	Ali Hamoudi (to Tractor Sazi – Conscription)
3	DF	IRI	Shoja' Khalilzadeh (to Tractor Sazi – Conscription)

== Technical staff ==
Position	Staff
Head coach	(Iran) Hossein Faraki
Assistant coach	(Iran) Majid Basirat
Assistant coach	(Iran) Ahmad Khodadad
Assistant coach	(Iran) Ghasem Zaghinejad
Goalkeepers coach	(Iran) Ahmad Sajjadi
Fitness trainer	(Iran) Ali Saleh-Nia
Analyzer	(Iran) Manouchehr Rezaei
Doctor	(Iran) Mohammad Rashadi
Doctor assistant	(Iran) Asghar Majidikia
Physiotherapist	(Iran) Ali Khorami
Massager	(Iran) Hossein Afshardoost
Massager	(Iran) Majid Fazlollahi
Massager	(Iran) Hamed Bateni
Administrative manager	(Iran) Reza Fatahi
Executive manager	(Iran) Rasoul Khorvash

== Statistics ==
Last updated on 30 July 2014

=== Players performance ===
			Iran Pro League				Hazfi Cup					Total			
N	P	Name	P	S	M	A	P	S	M	A		P	S	M	A
1	GK	(Iran) Rahman Ahmadi													
3	DF	(Iran) Shoja' Khalilzadeh					1	1	120						
4	MF	(Iran) Moharram Navidkia					1	1	68						
5	DF	(Iran) Hadi Aghili					1	1	120						
6	DF	(Iran) Mohammad-Ali Ahmadi													
7	MF	(Iran) Hossein Papi					1	1	120						
8	MF	(Iran) Rasoul Navidkia													
9	MF	(Iran) Mohammad Reza Khalatbari					1	1	120						
10	DF	(Iran) Abdollah Karami					1	1	120						
11	MF	(Iran) Amin Jahan Alian													
12	MF	(Iran) Ali Karimi					1	0	52						
14	FW	(Albania) Xhevahir Sukaj					1	0	30						
16	FW	(Iran) Erfan Maftoolkar													
17	MF	(Iran) Milad Sarlak													
18	DF	(Iran) Hossein Moradmand													
20	FW	(Iran) Mehdi Sharifi					1	1	90						
21	MF	(Iran) Vouria Ghafouri					1	1	120						
28	MF	(Iran) Ehsan Hajsafi					1	1	120						
29	FW	(Brazil) Luciano Pereira					1	1	120						
33	DF	(Iran) Saeed Ghaedifar													
35	GK	(Iran) Shahab Gordan					1	1	120						
37	FW	(Iran) Hossein Fazeli													
40	DF	(Iran) Ali Hamoudi													
99	MF	(Iran) Amir Hossein Karimi													
TOTALS							13	11	1320	0	0				

=== Disciplinary record ===
			Iran Pro League			Hazfi Cup			Total		
N	P	Name	Yellow card	(yellow card) (yellow-red card)	Red card	Yellow card	(yellow card) (yellow-red card)	Red card	Yellow card	(yellow card) (yellow-red card)	Red card
1	GK	(Iran) Rahman Ahmadi									
3	DF	(Iran) Shoja' Khalilzadeh	1	1		1			2	1	
4	MF	(Iran) Moharram Navidkia									
5	DF	(Iran) Hadi Aghili	5						5		
6	DF	(Iran) Mohammad-Ali Ahmadi	2						2		
7	MF	(Iran) Hossein Papi	1						1		
8	MF	(Iran) Rasoul Navidkia	1						1		
9	MF	(Iran) Mohammad Reza Khalatbari	3			1			4		
10	DF	(Iran) Abdollah Karami	2						2		
11	MF	(Iran) Amin Jahan Alian									
12	MF	(Iran) Ali Karimi	2						2		
14	FW	(Albania) Xhevahir Sukaj									
16	FW	(Iran) Erfan Maftoolkar									
17	MF	(Iran) Milad Sarlak									
18	DF	(Iran) Hossein Moradmand			1						1
20	FW	(Iran) Mehdi Sharifi	3						3		
21	MF	(Iran) Vouria Ghafouri	1						1		
28	MF	(Iran) Ehsan Hajsafi	1		1				1		1
29	FW	(Brazil) Luciano Pereira	2						2		
33	DF	(Iran) Saeed Ghaedifar	1						1		
35	GK	(Iran) Shahab Gordan	1						1		
37	FW	(Iran) Hossein Fazeli									
40	DF	(Iran) Ali Hamoudi									
99	MF	(Iran) Amir Hossein Karimi	2						2		
TOTALS			28	1	2	2			30	1	2

=== Clean sheets ===
			Iran Pro League			Hazfi Cup			Total		
N	P	Name	P	Gc	Cs	P	Gc	Cs	P	Gc	Cs
1	GK	(Iran) Rahman Ahmadi	8	10	2				8	10	2
35	GK	(Iran) Shahab Gordan	8	4	3	1	1	0	9	5	3
TOTALS			15	14	5	1	1	0	16	15	5

=== Own goals ===
N	P	Name	Iran Pro League	Hazfi Cup	Total
3	DF	(Iran) Shoja' Khalilzadeh	1		1
TOTALS			1		1

=== Overall statistics ===
Team performance	Iran Pro League			Hazfi Cup			Total		
Team performance	H	A	Tot	H	A	Tot	H	A	Tot
Games played	8	7	15		1	1	8	8	16
Games won	5	2	7		−	−	5	2	7
Games drawn	3	3	6		−	−	3	3	6
Games lost	0	2	2		1	1	−	3	3
Biggest win	3-1	2-0	3-1		−	−	3-1	2-0	3-1
Biggest loss	−	3-0	3-0		1-0	1-0	−	3-0	3-0
Goals scored	13	7	20		0	0	13	7	20
Goals conceded	6	8	14		1	1	6	8	14
Average Goals scored per game	1,63	1	1,33		−	−	1,63	0,87	1,25
Average Goals conceded per game	0,75	1,14	0,93		1	1	0,75	1,12	0.94
Points	18	9	27		0	0	18	9	27
Winning rate	62%	28%	47%		0%	0%	62%	25%	44%

== Competitions ==
=== Overall ===
Competition	Started round	Final position / round	First match	Last match
Iran Pro League	—	Winners	1 August 2014	15 May 2015
Hazfi Cup	Round of 32	Round of 32	18 October 2014	18 October 2014

Updated to match played 15 May 2015
Source: Competitions

=== Iran Pro League ===
==== Standings ====
Pos	Team	Pld	W	D	L	GF	GA	GD	Pts	Qualification or relegation
1	Sepahan (C)	30	17	8	5	46	27	+19	59	Qualification for the 2016 AFC Champions League group stage
2	Tractor Sazi	30	17	7	6	58	34	+24	58	Qualification for the 2016 AFC Champions League group stage
3	Naft Tehran	30	16	10	4	45	28	+17	58	Qualification for the 2016 AFC Champions League qualifying play-off
4	Zob Ahan	30	14	10	6	46	26	+20	52	Qualification for the 2016 AFC Champions League Group stage (Note: Zob Ahan secured qualification for the 2016 AFC Champions League through winning the 2014–15 Hazfi Cup.)
5	Foolad	30	15	7	8	33	24	+9	52	

Updated to match(es) played on 15 May 2015. Source: FIFA.com
Rules for classification: 1) points; 2) goal difference; 3) number of goals scored.
(C) Champions

==== Results summary ====
Overall								Home						Away					
Pld	W	D	L	GF	GA	GD	Pts	W	D	L	GF	GA	GD	W	D	L	GF	GA	GD
30	17	8	5	46	27	+19	59	10	5	0	27	10	+17	7	3	5	19	17	+2

Last updated: 15 May 2015.
Source: Ipl Stats

==== Results by round ====
Round	1	2	3	4	5	6	7	8	9	10	11	12	13	14	15	16	17	18	19	20	21	22	23	24	25	26	27	28	29	30
Ground	H	A	H	A	H	A	H	A	H	A	H	A	H	H	A	A	H	A	H	A	H	A	H	A	H	A	H	A	A	H
Result	W	W	W	L	D	D	D	W	D	D	W	L	W	W	D	W	W	L	D	W	D	L	W	L	W	W	W	W	W	W
Position	1	1	1	1	2	4	4	3	5	4	3	4	4	2	3	2	2	3	4	3	4	4	4	4	3	3	3	3	3	1

Updated to match(es) played on 15 May 2015. Source: "Ipl".
A = Away; H = Home; W = Win; D = Draw; L = Loss

==== Matches ====
Win Draw Loss Postponed

Date Round	Home	Score	Away	Location

1 August 2014 1	Sepahan	2–0	Paykan	Isfahan
19:30 DST+04:30	Ghafouri 19'; Sukaj 80'; Karami (yellow card) 86'	Report	Nosrati (yellow card) 54'	Stadium: Foolad Shahr Stadium; Attendance: 8,000; Referee: Yadollah Jahanbazi

7 August 2014 2	Gostaresh Foolad	0–2	Sepahan	Tabriz
18:00 DST+04:30		Report	Khalilzadeh (yellow card) 20'; Khalatbari 32'; Aghily (yellow card) 59'; Pereira 65'; Navidkia (yellow card) 68'; Karimi (yellow card) 82'	Stadium: Bonyan Diesel Stadium; Attendance: 610; Referee: Babak Vasilehbar

14 August 2014 3	Sepahan	3–1	Esteghlal	Isfahan
19:15 DST+04:30	Hajsafi 27' (pen.); Sharifi 33'; Aghily (yellow card) 44'; Pereira (yellow card) 45', (goal) 63'; Khalilzadeh (yellow card) 66' (yellow-red card) 90'; Khalatbari (yellow card) 69'	Report	Fakhreddini 17'; Heydari (yellow card) 95'	Stadium: Foolad Shahr Stadium; Attendance: 12,000; Referee: Alireza Faghani

19 August 2014 4	Naft Tehran	3–0	Sepahan	Tehran
18:00 DST+04:30	Padovani 32'; Kamyabinia 45'; Beiranvand (yellow card) 50'; Ghorbani 67'; Hajmohammadi (yellow card) 69'; Padovani (yellow card) 75'	Report	Moradmand (red card) 44'; Hajsafi (yellow card) 90'	Stadium: Takhti Stadium; Attendance: 800; Referee: Mohammadreza Akbarian

24 August 2014 5	Sepahan	1–1	Foolad	Isfahan
19:00 DST+04:30	Karami 64'; Sharifi (yellow card) 70'; Aghily (yellow card) 80'	Report	Vakia (yellow card) 23'; Badrlou (yellow card) 43'; Rafiei 74'	Stadium: Foolad Shahr Stadium; Attendance: 4,500; Referee: Touraj Haghverdi

29 August 2014 6	Zob Ahan	1–1	Sepahan	Isfahan
19:00 DST+04:30	Mosalman 60'; Ashouri (yellow card) 76' (yellow-red card) 80'	Report	Khalatbari (yellow card) 1'; Sharifi 56'; Karimi (yellow card) 90'	Stadium: Foolad Shahr Stadium; Attendance: 4,800; Referee: Seyed Hossein Zargar

4 September 2014 7	Sepahan	1–1	Malavan	Isfahan
18:50 DST+04:30	Pereira 5'; Hajsafi (yellow card) 78'	Report	Rafkhaei 30'; Maeboodi (yellow card) 61'	Stadium: Foolad Shahr Stadium; Attendance: 2,200; Referee: Gholamreza Jabbari

11 September 2014 8	Padideh	0–1	Sepahan	Mashhad
16:45 DST+04:30	Jovanović (yellow card) 35'; Nejadmehdi (yellow card) 38'; Gharibi (yellow card) 79'	Report	Khalatbari 54'; Gordan (yellow card) 82'; Aghily (yellow card) 85'	Stadium: Samen Al-Aeme Stadium; Attendance: 22,000; Referee: Babak Vasilehbar

18 September 2014 9	Sepahan	1–1	Saba Qom	Isfahan
18:30 DST+04:30	Pereira 81'; Papi (yellow card) 84'; Karami (yellow card) 90+3'	Report	Maquinho 14'; Kalantari (yellow card) 29'; Tahmasbi (yellow card) 44'; Bayat (yellow card) 69'; Badamaki (yellow card) 84'	Stadium: Foolad Shahr Stadium; Attendance: 2,000; Referee: Shahin Hajbabaei

26 September 2014 10	Tractor Sazi	1–1	Sepahan	Tabriz
17:40 IRST+03:30	Khalilzadeh 69' (o.g.); Gordani (yellow card) 74'	Report	Khalatbari 48'	Stadium: Sahand Stadium; Attendance: 51,500; Referee: Seyed Hossein Zargar

3 October 2014 11	Sepahan	1–0	Persepolis	Isfahan
18:30 IRST+03:30	Pereira (yellow card) 24'; Sharifi 90+4', (yellow card) 90+5'	Report	Nourmohammadi (yellow card) 17'; Haghighi (yellow card) 64'	Stadium: Foolad Shahr Stadium; Attendance: 13,500; Referee: Alireza Faghani

22 October 2014 12	Rah Ahan	1–0	Sepahan	Tehran
15:30 IRST+03:30	Hosseinpour 35'; Gholami (yellow card) 65'	Report	Hajsafi (red card) 63'; Khalatbari (yellow card) 75'	Stadium: Rah Ahan Stadium; Attendance: 371; Referee: Mouood Bonyadifar

31 October 2014 13	Sepahan	3–2	Esteghlal Khuzestan	Isfahan
15:30 IRST+03:30	Ahmadi (yellow card) 17'; Sharifi 45+1', 78'; Ghafouri 64'	Report	Ousani (yellow card) 17', (goal) 29'; Heidari (yellow card) 34'; Seifollahi (yellow card) 42', (goal) 51'	Stadium: Foolad Shahr Stadium; Attendance: 0 Referee: Yadollah Jahanbazi

6 November 2014 14	Sepahan	1 – 0	Naft Masjed Soleyman	Isfahan
	Khalatbari 13'			Stadium: Foolad Shahr Stadium

21 November 2014 15	Saipa	2 – 2	Sepahan	Karaj
				Stadium: Enghelab Stadium

4 December 2014 16	Paykan	1 – 2	Sepahan	Tehran
				Stadium: Shahre Qods Stadium

10 December 2014 17	Sepahan	4 – 1	Gostaresh Foolad	Isfahan
				Stadium: Foolad Shahr Stadium

18	Esteghlal	v	Sepahan	Tehran
				Stadium: Azadi Stadium

19	Sepahan	v	Naft Tehran	Isfahan
				Stadium: Foolad Shahr Stadium

20	Foolad	v	Sepahan	Ahvaz
				Stadium: Ghadir Stadium

21	Sepahan	v	Zob Ahan	Isfahan
				Stadium: Foolad Shahr Stadium

22	Malavan	v	Sepahan	Bandar Anzali
				Stadium: Takhti Stadium

23	Sepahan	v	Padideh Mashhad	Isfahan
				Stadium: Foolad Shahr Stadium

24	Saba Qom	v	Sepahan	Qom
				Stadium: Yadegar-e Emam Stadium

25	Sepahan	v	Tractor Sazi	Isfahan
				Stadium: Foolad Shahr Stadium

26	Persepolis	v	Sepahan	Tehran
				Stadium: Azadi Stadium

27	Sepahan	v	Rah Ahan	Isfahan
				Stadium: Foolad Shahr Stadium

28	Esteghlal Khuzestan	v	Sepahan	Ahvaz
				Stadium: Takhti Stadium

29	Naft Masjed Soleyman	v	Sepahan	Masjed Soleyman
				Stadium: Behnam Mohammadi Stadium

30	Sepahan	v	Saipa	Isfahan
				Stadium: Foolad Shahr Stadium

=== Hazfi Cup ===
Win Draw Loss Postponed

Date Round	Home	Score	Away	Location

18 October 2014 1/16	Gol Gohar	1 – 0 (a.e.t.)	Sepahan	Sirjan
14:00 DST+03:30	Jomehzadeh 105' (pen.)			Stadium: Gol Gohar Stadium; Attendance: 2,000

=== Friendly Matches ===
Win Draw Loss Postponed

Date Round	Home	Score	Away	Location

23 June 2014 1	Sepahan	3 – 1	Sepahan B	Isfahan, Iran
18:30 UTC+03:30	Sukaj; Ghafouri; Sukaj	Report	Safari	Stadium: Jaroukan Stadium; Attendance: 3,000

1 July 2014 2	Sepahan	1 – 0	Iran U20	Isfahan, Iran
18:00 UTC+03:30	Papi	Report		Stadium: Jaroukan Stadium; Attendance: 1,500

4 July 2014 3	Sepahan	4 – 0	Sepahan B	Isfahan, Iran
17:00 UTC+03:30	Papi; Sharifi; Karimi; Maftoolkar	Report		Stadium: Jaroukan Stadium; Attendance: 1,000

9 July 2014 4	Arsenal Tula (Russia)	1 – 3	Sepahan	Bolu, Turkey
17:00 UTC+03:00	Votinov	Report	Sharifi; Karimi; Navidkia	Stadium: Bolu Stadium; Attendance: 1,000

12 July 2014 5	Gloria Buzău (Romania)	1 – 1	Sepahan	Bolu, Turkey
17:00 UTC+03:00	Dăniță	Report	Sharifi	Stadium: Bolu Stadium; Attendance: 1,000

15 July 2014 6	Alashkert (Armenia)	1 – 2	Sepahan	Bolu, Turkey
17:00 UTC+03:00	Manasyan	Report	Aghili; Karimi	Stadium: Bolu Stadium; Attendance: 1,000

23 July 2014 7	Fenerbahçe (Turkey)	1 – 0	Sepahan	Düzce, Turkey
	Topuz 20'			Stadium: Düzce 18 Temmuz Stadium; Attendance: 4,500

13 October 2014 8	Sepahan	7 – 2	Sepahan B	Isfahan, Iran
15:00 UTC+03:30	Papi; Pereira; Aghili; Sukaj; Fazeli	Report	Assadi; Morradi	Stadium: Jaroukan Stadium; Attendance: 2,000

14 November 2014 9	Sepahan	3 – 1	Sepahan B	Isfahan, Iran
15:00 UTC+03:30	(o.g.); Maftoolkar; Sharifi	Report	Ghalavand	Stadium: Jaroukan Stadium; Attendance: 1,000

16 November 2014 10	Sepahan	2 – 2	Zob Ahan	Isfahan, Iran
15:00 UTC+03:30	Khalatbari 20'; Papi 37'	Report	Farhadi 30'; Mosalman 45'	Stadium: Jaroukan Stadium; Attendance: 1,000

1 January 2015 11	Sepahan	1 – 2	Esteghlal Khuzestan	Kish, Iran
15:00 UTC+03:30	Khalatbari	Report	Momeni; Chaharmahali	Stadium: Kish Stadium; Attendance: 500

4 January 2015 12	Sepahan	1 – 0	Malavan	Kish, Iran
15:00 UTC+03:30	Karimi 8'	Report		Stadium: Kish Stadium; Attendance: 500

== See also ==
- 2015 AFC Champions League
- 2014–15 Iran Pro League
- 2014–15 Hazfi Cup
