= List of Iranian football transfers winter 2015–16 =

This is a list of Iranian football transfers for the 2015–16 winter transfer window. Transfers of Iran Pro League are listed. The transfer window opened on 23 December 2015 and closed on 19 January 2016.

== Players limits ==
The Iranian football clubs participating in the different levels of the 2015–16 Iranian football were allowed to have up to a maximum 35 players in their player lists, which would be categorized in the following groups:

- Up to maximum 18 adult (without any age limit) players
- Up to maximum 9 under-23 players (i.e. the player whose birth is after 1 January 1993).
- Up to maximum 8 under-21 players (i.e. the player whose birth is after 1 January 1995).

== Iran Pro League ==
=== Rules and regulations ===
According to Iran Football Federation rules for 2015–16 Iran Pro League, each Football Club is allowed to take up to maximum 6 new Iranian player from the other clubs who already played in the 2014–15 Iran Pro League season. In addition to these six new players, each club is allowed to take up to maximum 4 non-Iranian new players (at least one of them should be Asian) and up to 3 players from Free agent (who did not play in 2015–16 Iran Pro League season or doesn't list in any 2015–16 League after season's start) during the season. In addition to these players, the clubs are also able to take some new under-23 and under-21 years old players, if they have some free place in these categories in their player lists. Under-23 players should sign in transfer window but under-21 can be signed during the first mid-season. For the first time, in 2015–16 season clubs are allowed to sign Japanese player without foreign players (3+1) limit.

=== Esteghlal ===
In: Note: Flags indicate national team as defined under FIFA eligibility rules; some limited exceptions apply. Players may hold more than one non-FIFA nationality.

No.	Pos.	Nation	Player
27	MF	IRN	Hossein Hosseini (promoted from Academy)
16	FW	IRN	Mehdi Momeni (from Naft Tehran)
—	MF	MAR	Adil Chihi (from Free agent)

Out: Note: Flags indicate national team as defined under FIFA eligibility rules; some limited exceptions apply. Players may hold more than one non-FIFA nationality.

No.	Pos.	Nation	Player
18	MF	BRA	Rivaldo Barbosa (Released)
13	MF	IRQ	Karrar Jassim (to (Iraq) Naft Al-Wasat)
21	DF	IRN	Majid Hosseini (on loan at Rah Ahan Yazdan)
35	DF	IRN	Mehdi Karbalaei (to Gostaresh Foolad, previously at Khoneh Be Khoneh Mazandaran)

=== Esteghlal Ahvaz ===
In: Note: Flags indicate national team as defined under FIFA eligibility rules; some limited exceptions apply. Players may hold more than one non-FIFA nationality.

No.	Pos.	Nation	Player
39	MF	IRN	Adel Masoudifard (from Free agent)
32	MF	IRN	Sadegh Zharfani (promoted from Academy)
36	MF	IRN	Danial Mousavi (promoted from Academy)
37	DF	IRN	Hossein Saki (promoted from Academy)
26	DF	IRN	Maki Sharifi (from Free agent)
28	FW	IRN	Mehdi Niyayesh Pour (from Free agent)
42	MF	IRN	Pedram Ardalany (from Free agent)
29	MF	IRN	Mohammad Javad Kerdouni (promoted from Academy)
34	DF	IRN	Mehdi Yalali (promoted from Academy)
31	MF	IRN	Mojtaba Rashidi (promoted from Academy)
—	FW	BIH	Sandi Sahman (from Free agent)
45	GK	IRN	Ali Kordani (from Karoun Ahvaz)
25	DF	IRN	Milad Rabbani (from Free agent)
38	FW	IRN	Mirfarzad Majidi (from unknown)

Out: Note: Flags indicate national team as defined under FIFA eligibility rules; some limited exceptions apply. Players may hold more than one non-FIFA nationality.

No.	Pos.	Nation	Player
11	MF	IRN	Milad Jafari (to Mes Kerman)
18	MF	IRN	Armin Mirdoraghi (to Foolad Yazd)
2	MF	IRN	Mohsen Hamidi (to Gostaresh Foolad)
5	DF	IRN	Saeed Salarzadeh (to (Thailand) Rayong)
33	GK	IRN	Behnam Mousavi (to Foolad B)
9	FW	IRN	Mohammad Gholami (to Khoune Be khoune)
6	DF	IRN	Saeed Ghezelagchi (to Paykan)
7	DF	IRN	Mobin Mirdoraghi (to Giti Pasand)
14	MF	IRN	Shahin Majidi (to Nassaji)
77	MF	IRN	Farzad Ashoubi (to Rah Ahan Yazdan)
23	DF	IRN	Ali Hosseini (Released)
3	MF	IRN	Mohammad-Esmail Nazari (to (Thailand) TOT)
1	GK	IRN	Parviz Karimi (to Aluminium Arak)
4	DF	IRN	Morteza Mansouri (to Khoune Be khoune)

=== Esteghlal Khuzestan ===
In: Note: Flags indicate national team as defined under FIFA eligibility rules; some limited exceptions apply. Players may hold more than one non-FIFA nationality.

No.	Pos.	Nation	Player
18	MF	IRN	Mehdi Zobeydi (from Free agent)
29	MF	IRN	Iman Obeydipour (promoted from Academy)
32	MF	IRN	Mostafa Ghanbarizadeh (promoted from Academy)
12	MF	TLS	Fellipe Bertoldo (from (Japan) Oita Trinita)
70	MF	IRN	Omid Sing (from Siahjamegan)

Out: Note: Flags indicate national team as defined under FIFA eligibility rules; some limited exceptions apply. Players may hold more than one non-FIFA nationality.

No.	Pos.	Nation	Player
—	DF	IRN	Ramtin Soleymanzadeh (to Paykan, previously at Fajr Sepasi – conscription)

=== Foolad ===
In: Note: Flags indicate national team as defined under FIFA eligibility rules; some limited exceptions apply. Players may hold more than one non-FIFA nationality.

No.	Pos.	Nation	Player
31	GK	IRN	Farzad Tayebipour (promoted from Academy)
9	FW	IRN	Mehrdad Bayrami (from Tractor Sazi)
20	MF	IRN	Ahmad Abdollahzadeh (from Tractor Sazi – conscription return)
14	FW	CMR	Dorge Kouemaha (from Free agent)
28	FW	IRN	Amin Jahan Kohan (from Malavan – conscription return)
64	GK	IRN	Mehrdad Tahmasbi (from Tractor Sazi)

Out: Note: Flags indicate national team as defined under FIFA eligibility rules; some limited exceptions apply. Players may hold more than one non-FIFA nationality.

No.	Pos.	Nation	Player
23	FW	IRN	Hossein Maleki (to Paykan)
33	GK	IRN	Mehrdad Bashagardi (to Parseh)
2	FW	IRN	Mehdi Daghagheleh (to Saipa)
—	FW	IRN	Arash Afshin (Released, previously at Malavan)

=== Gostaresh Foolad ===
In: Note: Flags indicate national team as defined under FIFA eligibility rules; some limited exceptions apply. Players may hold more than one non-FIFA nationality.

No.	Pos.	Nation	Player
12	FW	IRN	Mehdi Seyed Salehi (from Free agent)
70	DF	IRN	Mohsen Hamidi (from Esteghlal Ahvaz)
80	MF	IRN	Saman Nariman Jahan (from Tractor Sazi – conscription return)
4	MF	BRA	Leonardo Pimenta (from Free agent)
26	DF	IRN	Mehdi Karbalaei (from Esteghlal)
18	MF	IRN	Siamak Koohnavard (from Rah Ahan Yazdan)
24	DF	IRN	Amin Taghizadeh (from Free agent)

Out: Note: Flags indicate national team as defined under FIFA eligibility rules; some limited exceptions apply. Players may hold more than one non-FIFA nationality.

No.	Pos.	Nation	Player
9	FW	BRA	Jacson da Paixão (Released)
7	MF	IRN	Ayoub Kalantari (to Tractor Sazi)
90	FW	IRN	Saeid Daghighi (to Mes Kerman)
6	MF	IRN	Mehdi Kiani (to Tractor Sazi)
—	DF	IRN	Saeid Aghaei (to Tractor Sazi – previously on conscription period)
3	DF	IRN	Mojtaba Tarshiz (Released)
13	FW	IRN	Yousef Seyedi (on loan at Machine Sazi)

=== Malavan ===
In: Note: Flags indicate national team as defined under FIFA eligibility rules; some limited exceptions apply. Players may hold more than one non-FIFA nationality.

No.	Pos.	Nation	Player
4	MF	IRN	Mohammadreza Naghdipour (promoted from Academy)
28	FW	IRN	Siavash Hagh Nazari (from (United States) Orange County Blues)
23	FW	IRN	Hesam Soltanpour (promoted from Academy)
3	DF	IRN	Hamed Noormohammadi (from Free agent)
88	MF	IRN	Alireza Ramezani (from Sanat Sari)
66	FW	IRN	Shahin Balijayi (from Foolad Yazd)
12	DF	IRN	Mohammad Sattari (from Khoneh Be Khoneh)
—	FW	IRN	Mehrdad Oladi (from Free agent)

Out: Note: Flags indicate national team as defined under FIFA eligibility rules; some limited exceptions apply. Players may hold more than one non-FIFA nationality.

No.	Pos.	Nation	Player
—	FW	IRN	Amir Mohammad Madani (to Persepolis – conscription return)
24	FW	IRN	Farzad Hatami (to Tractor Sazi)
1	GK	MDA	Serghei Pașcenco (Released)
18	FW	IRN	Mohammad Nozhati (to Shahrdari Ardabil)
21	FW	IRN	Amin Jahan Kohan (to Foolad – conscription return)
7	FW	IRN	Arash Afshin (to Foolad – conscription return)

=== Naft Tehran ===
In: Note: Flags indicate national team as defined under FIFA eligibility rules; some limited exceptions apply. Players may hold more than one non-FIFA nationality.

No.	Pos.	Nation	Player
18	FW	IRN	Arshia Jabari (from Free agent)
41	FW	IRN	Moahammad Saeid Baraviyeh (promoted from Academy)
42	DF	IRN	Milad Zakipour (promoted from Academy)
24	FW	IRN	Farid Mohammadizadeh (from Free agent)
—	FW	IRN	Mehdi Mohammad-Yari (promoted from Academy)

Out: Note: Flags indicate national team as defined under FIFA eligibility rules; some limited exceptions apply. Players may hold more than one non-FIFA nationality.

No.	Pos.	Nation	Player
33	DF	IRN	Meysam Joudaki (on loan at Rah Ahan Yazdan)
7	FW	IRN	Mehdi Momeni (to Esteghlal)
11	FW	IRN	Payam Sadeghian (to Saba Qom)
17	FW	CMR	Aloys Nong (to Tractor Sazi)
12	GK	IRN	Ali Mohsenzadeh (to Persepolis, previously at Khoneh Be Khoneh)
3	DF	BRA	Carlos Santos (to Ratchaburi)

=== Padideh ===
In: Note: Flags indicate national team as defined under FIFA eligibility rules; some limited exceptions apply. Players may hold more than one non-FIFA nationality.

No.	Pos.	Nation	Player
63	MF	IRN	Mohsen Bayat (from Free agent)
3	DF	IRN	Mostafa Tajik (from Payam khorasan F.C)
99	FW	IRN	Bahman Salari (from Saipa)
9	DF	IRN	Ahmad Alenemeh (from Free agent)
80	MF	IRN	Farshad Ghasemi (from Aluminium Hormozgan)
40	MF	IRN	Ali Hesami (from Fajr Sepasi)
66	MF	IRN	Sepehr Rouzitalab (from Aluminium Hormozgan)

Out: Note: Flags indicate national team as defined under FIFA eligibility rules; some limited exceptions apply. Players may hold more than one non-FIFA nationality.

No.	Pos.	Nation	Player
2	DF	IRN	Aram Abbasi (to Sanat Naft)
20	MF	IRN	Ahmad Eskandari (Released)
77	DF	IRN	Ali Nademi (Released)
19	DF	CRO	Igor Prahić (Released)

=== Persepolis ===
In: Note: Flags indicate national team as defined under FIFA eligibility rules; some limited exceptions apply. Players may hold more than one non-FIFA nationality.

No.	Pos.	Nation	Player
44	DF	IRN	Amir Abbas Ayenechi (from Free agent)
30	GK	IRN	Ali Mohsenzadeh (from Naft Tehran)
55	GK	UZB	Alexander Lobanov (from (Uzbekistan) Pakhtakor)

Out: Note: Flags indicate national team as defined under FIFA eligibility rules; some limited exceptions apply. Players may hold more than one non-FIFA nationality.

No.	Pos.	Nation	Player
—	FW	IRN	Amir Mohammad Madani (to Rah Ahan Yazdan, previously at Malavan)
17	FW	IRN	Ali Fatemi (on loan at Rah Ahan Yazdan)
88	GK	IRN	Iman Sadeghi (to Khoune Be Khonue)

=== Rah Ahan Yazdan ===
In: Note: Flags indicate national team as defined under FIFA eligibility rules; some limited exceptions apply. Players may hold more than one non-FIFA nationality.

No.	Pos.	Nation	Player
7	FW	IRN	Mohammad Abbaszadeh (from Free agent)
—	FW	IRN	Amir Mohammad Madani (from Persepolis, previously at Malavan)
—	FW	IRN	Soheyl Hezar Jaribi (from Niroo Zamini)
70	MF	IRN	Mohammad Reza Soleimani (from Free agent)
17	FW	IRN	Ali Fatemi (on loan from Persepolis)
55	DF	IRN	Hamed Zamani (from Niroo Zamini – conscription return)
37	DF	IRN	Majid Hosseini (on loan from Esteghlal)
72	MF	IRN	Mehdi Hanafi (from Aluminium Hormozgan)
19	DF	IRN	Meysam Joudaki (on loan from Naft Tehran)
40	MF	IRN	Ali Pazouki (from Moghavemat Tehran)
4	DF	IRN	Mehran Mousavi (from Shahrdari Ardabil)
44	GK	IRN	Mohsen Forouzan (from Siah Jamegan)
34	MF	IRN	Farzad Ashoubi (from Esteghlal Ahvaz)
90	DF	CYP	Athos Solomou (from (Cyprus) Doxa Katokopias)
74	GK	IRN	Kasra Kazemi (promoted from Azademy)

Out: Note: Flags indicate national team as defined under FIFA eligibility rules; some limited exceptions apply. Players may hold more than one non-FIFA nationality.

No.	Pos.	Nation	Player
77	MF	IRN	Hossein Karimi (to Siah Jamegan)
12	DF	IRN	Mehdi Jafarpour (to Siah Jamegan)
16	MF	IRN	Mehran Ghasemi (Released)
32	DF	IRN	Abbas Mazrouei (Demoted to Academy)
33	GK	IRN	Ali Shafiei (Demoted to Academy)
66	MF	IRN	Mehran Asgari (Demoted to Academy)
99	MF	IRN	Ali Aminorayayi (to Giti Pasand)
—	FW	IRN	Soheyl Hezar Jaribi (on loan at Khoneh Be Khoneh)
14	MF	IRN	Hamidreza Aliasgari (to Siah Jamegan)
8	MF	IRN	Siamak Koohnavard (to Gostaresh Foulad)
11	FW	IRN	Amin Manouchehri (to Sepahan)
22	GK	IRN	Mohammad Ali Ramezanian (on loan at Khoneh Be Khoneh)
15	FW	IRN	Mohammad Hossein Babagoli (Demoted to Academy)
35	FW	IRN	Salar Lalani (Demoted to Academy)
24	DF	IRN	Milad Mohammadi (to (Russia) Terek Grozny)
13	DF	IRN	Mohsen Irannejad (Released – Injury Settlement)

=== Saba Qom ===
In: Note: Flags indicate national team as defined under FIFA eligibility rules; some limited exceptions apply. Players may hold more than one non-FIFA nationality.

No.	Pos.	Nation	Player
10	FW	IRN	Farid Karimi (from Tractor Sazi – conscription return)
99	FW	IRN	Payam Sadeghian (from Naft Tehran)
93	MF	IRN	Akbar Sadeghi (from Zob Ahan)
29	MF	IRN	Mohammadreza Baouj Rezaei (from Free agent)

Out: Note: Flags indicate national team as defined under FIFA eligibility rules; some limited exceptions apply. Players may hold more than one non-FIFA nationality.

No.	Pos.	Nation	Player
9	MF	IRN	Reza Haghighi (to (Thailand) Suphanburi)
28	DF	IRN	Hashem Beikzadeh (to Zob Ahan)
5	MF	IRN	Ghasem Dehnavi (to Khoune Be khoune)
25	MF	GEO	Ioseb Chakhvashvili (Released)

=== Saipa ===
In: Note: Flags indicate national team as defined under FIFA eligibility rules; some limited exceptions apply. Players may hold more than one non-FIFA nationality.

No.	Pos.	Nation	Player
23	MF	IRN	Amin Javadi Moghadam (promoted from Academy)
27	FW	IRN	Hossein Kamyab (promoted from Academy)
25	FW	IRN	Mehdi Daghagheleh (from Foolad)
24	MF	IRN	Andranik Teymourian (from (Qatar) Umm Salal)
31	GK	IRN	Fardin Zakariayi (promoted from Academy)

Out: Note: Flags indicate national team as defined under FIFA eligibility rules; some limited exceptions apply. Players may hold more than one non-FIFA nationality.

No.	Pos.	Nation	Player
—	FW	IRN	Soroush Firouzi (Released)
17	FW	IRN	Bahman Salari (to Padideh)
3	DF	IRN	Vahid Mohammadzadeh (to Zob Ahan)
9	FW	IRN	Reza Norouzi (to Paykan)
6	MF	IRN	Javad Nekounam (to (Qatar) Al-Arabi)

=== Sepahan ===
In: Note: Flags indicate national team as defined under FIFA eligibility rules; some limited exceptions apply. Players may hold more than one non-FIFA nationality.

No.	Pos.	Nation	Player
66	DF	IRN	Mohammad Ali Ahmadi (from Free agent)
17	MF	BIH	Senijad Ibričić (from (Turkey) Karşıyak)
80	MF	IRN	Ali Hazami (from Free agent)
74	FW	IRN	Amin Manouchehri (from Rah Ahan)

Out: Note: Flags indicate national team as defined under FIFA eligibility rules; some limited exceptions apply. Players may hold more than one non-FIFA nationality.

No.	Pos.	Nation	Player
20	FW	IRN	Mehdi Sharifi (to Tractor Sazi – conscription)
53	FW	IRN	Mehdi Alimoradi (to Sepahan U23)

=== Siahjamegan ===
In: Note: Flags indicate national team as defined under FIFA eligibility rules; some limited exceptions apply. Players may hold more than one non-FIFA nationality.

No.	Pos.	Nation	Player
24	DF	ENG	Korede Aiyegbusi (from (Sweden) AFC United)
90	DF	SWE	Kyle Konwea (from (Sweden) Assyriska)
77	FW	IRN	Mehdi Menarizadeh (from Tose'eh Kish)
55	DF	IRN	Mohsen Aghaei (from Free agent)
99	FW	GAM	Alagie Sosseh (from (Norway) Nest-Sotra)
35	MF	IRN	Hossein Karimi (from Rah Ahan Yazdan)
19	DF	IRN	Mehdi Jafarpour (from Rah Ahan Yazdan)
66	MF	IRN	Pedram Esmaeilian (from Sepahan Academy)
33	GK	IRN	Matin Safaeian (from Foolad Mashhad Academy)
65	MF	IRN	Milad Nouri (from Free agent)
14	MF	IRN	Hamidreza Aliasgari (from Rah Ahan Yazdan)

Out: Note: Flags indicate national team as defined under FIFA eligibility rules; some limited exceptions apply. Players may hold more than one non-FIFA nationality.

No.	Pos.	Nation	Player
13	FW	IRN	Sajad Rahbar (Released)
1	GK	IRN	Mohsen Forouzan (to Rah Ahan Yazdan)
6	DF	MNE	Milan Jovanović (Retired)
30	MF	IRN	Babak Moradi (to Aluminium Arak)
17	FW	IRN	Tomik Davoudian (Released)
70	MF	BRA	Renan Silva (Released)
88	DF	IRN	Mohammadreza Bazaj (Released)
2	DF	IRN	Amir Tizrou (to Machine Sazi)
9	FW	IRN	Mohsen Delir (to Machine Sazi)
19	MF	IRN	Amir Hossein Zoshki (Released)
7	MF	IRN	Ahmad Amir Kamdar (to Zob Ahan)
5	DF	IRN	Saeid Mehdipour (to Machine Sazi)
11	MF	IRN	Omid Sing (to Esteghlal Khuzestan)
23	FW	IRN	Peyman Miri (to Sanat Naft)

=== Tractor Sazi ===
In: Note: Flags indicate national team as defined under FIFA eligibility rules; some limited exceptions apply. Players may hold more than one non-FIFA nationality.

No.	Pos.	Nation	Player
66	MF	IRN	Mehdi Kiani (from Gostaresh Foolad)
15	MF	IRN	Ayoub Kalantari (from Gostaresh Foolad)
24	FW	IRN	Farzad Hatami (from Malavan)
77	DF	IRN	Saeid Aghaei (from Gostaresh Foolad – previously on conscription)
32	FW	IRN	Mehran Ghorbanpour (promoted from Academy)
28	FW	IRN	Mehdi Sharifi (from Sepahan – conscription)
44	GK	IRN	Farzin Garousian (from Aluminium Hormozgan)
27	FW	CMR	Aloys Nong (from Naft Tehran)
—	GK	IRN	Masoud Homami (from PAS Hamedan)

Out: Note: Flags indicate national team as defined under FIFA eligibility rules; some limited exceptions apply. Players may hold more than one non-FIFA nationality.

No.	Pos.	Nation	Player
9	FW	IRN	Farid Karimi (to Saba Qom – conscription return)
7	MF	IRN	Saman Nariman Jahan (to Gostaresh Foolad – conscription return)
99	FW	IRN	Mehrdad Bayrami (to Foolad)
17	FW	TUN	Hamza Younés (Released)
31	MF	IRN	Ebrahim Abednezhad (Released)
23	DF	IRN	Mirhani Hashemi (to Khoune Be khoune)
20	MF	IRN	Ahmad Abdollahzadeh (to Foolad – conscription return)
22	GK	IRN	Mehrdad Tahmasbi (to Foolad)

=== Zob Ahan ===
In: Note: Flags indicate national team as defined under FIFA eligibility rules; some limited exceptions apply. Players may hold more than one non-FIFA nationality.

No.	Pos.	Nation	Player
26	DF	IRN	Nima Taheri (promoted from Academy)
17	FW	BRA	Marco Aurélio Iubel (from (Brazil) Cuiabá)
77	MF	IRN	Ahmad Amir Kamdar (from Siahjamegan)
33	DF	IRN	Vahid Mohammadzadeh (from Saipa)
61	DF	IRN	Hashem Beikzadeh (from Saba Qom)
31	FW	IRN	Hamidreza Jafari (promoted from Academy)

Out: Note: Flags indicate national team as defined under FIFA eligibility rules; some limited exceptions apply. Players may hold more than one non-FIFA nationality.

No.	Pos.	Nation	Player
5	MF	IRN	Akbar Sadeghi (to Saba Qom)

== Azadegan League ==
=== Rules and regulations ===
According to Iran Football Federation rules for 2015–16 Azadegan League each club is allowed to take up to 3 players from Free agent during the season. In addition to these players, the clubs are also able to take some new under-23 and under-21 years old players, if they have some free place in these categories in their player lists. Under-23 players should sign in transfer window but under-21 can be signed during the first mid-season. Clubs in Azadegan League can not sign any foreign player. There is no limit for signing Iranian players.

=== Aluminium Arak ===
In: Note: Flags indicate national team as defined under FIFA eligibility rules; some limited exceptions apply. Players may hold more than one non-FIFA nationality.

No.	Pos.	Nation	Player
44	MF	IRN	Babak Moradi (from Siah Jamegan)
60	MF	IRN	Peyman Poursadeghi (from Caspian Qazvin)
77	MF	IRN	Rasoul Soroushnia (from Paykan)
—	GK	IRN	Parviz Karimi (from Esteghlal Ahvaz)
65	MF	IRN	Eshagh Sobhani (from PAS Hamedan)
45	MF	IRN	Akbar Bakhtiari (from Gol Gohar)

Out: Note: Flags indicate national team as defined under FIFA eligibility rules; some limited exceptions apply. Players may hold more than one non-FIFA nationality.

No.	Pos.	Nation	Player
3	DF	IRN	Mehdi Ghoreishi (to Machine Sazi)
99	FW	IRN	Reza Etemadi (to Machine Sazi)
1	GK	IRN	Mehdi Eslami (to Machine Sazi)
—	FW	IRN	Reza Rezaei (to Nassaji)
9	MF	IRN	Sadegh Gashni (to Mes Kerman)
66	MF	IRN	Hossein Madadi (on loan at Pars Jonoubi Jam)
36	FW	IRN	Saeid Gholamali Beygi (to Niroo Zamini – conscription)

=== Aluminium Hormozgan ===
In: Note: Flags indicate national team as defined under FIFA eligibility rules; some limited exceptions apply. Players may hold more than one non-FIFA nationality.

No.	Pos.	Nation	Player
35	DF	IRN	Shirzad Farid (from Pars Jonoubi Jam)
23	FW	IRN	Arash Abdoli (from Esteghlal Khounsorkh)
—	GK	IRN	Mehdi Behdarvand (from Free agent)
—	MF	IRN	Mohsen Chegini (from Free agent)
98	MF	IRN	Pejman Ghermezi (from Free agent)
—	GK	IRN	Amir Meghdad Maleki (from Gol Gohar)
68	GK	IRN	Mohammad Bagher Shabani (from Parseh)
28	MF	IRN	Mohammad Sadegh Taheri (from Parseh)
16	MF	IRN	Milad Salehi (from PAS Hamedan)

Out: Note: Flags indicate national team as defined under FIFA eligibility rules; some limited exceptions apply. Players may hold more than one non-FIFA nationality.

No.	Pos.	Nation	Player
72	MF	IRN	Mehdi Hanafi (to Rah Ahan Yazdan)
9	FW	IRN	Akbar Saghiri (to Sanat Naft)
3	DF	IRN	Kaveh Zangian (to Gol Gohar)
10	FW	IRN	Mehrdad Avakh (to Gol Gohar)
77	MF	IRN	Farshad Ghasemi (to Padideh)
66	MF	IRN	Sepehr Rouzitalab (to Padideh)
7	MF	IRN	Ali Akbar Farhang (to Pars Jonoubi Jam)
13	MF	IRN	Kianoush Mirzaei (to Pars Jonoubi Jam)
1	GK	IRN	Ali Hassani Sefat (Released)
99	GK	IRN	Mohammadreza Khazaei (to PAS Hamedan)
22	GK	IRN	Farzin Garousian (to Tractor Sazi)

=== Damash ===
In: Note: Flags indicate national team as defined under FIFA eligibility rules; some limited exceptions apply. Players may hold more than one non-FIFA nationality.

No.	Pos.	Nation	Player
11	MF	IRN	Mohammadreza Mahdavi (from Free agent)
8	MF	IRN	Saeid Ghadami (from Sanat Naft)
72	FW	IRN	Hossein Hejazian (from Gol Gohar)
28	DF	IRN	Masoud Mikaeili (from Free agent)

Out: Note: Flags indicate national team as defined under FIFA eligibility rules; some limited exceptions apply. Players may hold more than one non-FIFA nationality.

No.	Pos.	Nation	Player
7	MF	IRN	Mohammadreza Almaskhaleh (to Sepidrood)

=== Fajr Sepasi ===
In: Note: Flags indicate national team as defined under FIFA eligibility rules; some limited exceptions apply. Players may hold more than one non-FIFA nationality.

No.	Pos.	Nation	Player
—	FW	IRN	Shahin Nejat (from Nassaji)
—		IRN	Saeid Barzegar (promoted from Academy)
—		IRN	Mohammad Javad Jalali (promoted from Academy)

Out: Note: Flags indicate national team as defined under FIFA eligibility rules; some limited exceptions apply. Players may hold more than one non-FIFA nationality.

No.	Pos.	Nation	Player
5	DF	IRN	Ramtin Soleymanzadeh (to Esteghlal Khuzestan – conscription return)
3	DF	IRN	Milad Sheykh Soleimani (Released)
22	MF	IRN	Ali Hesami (to Padideh)

=== Foolad Yazd ===
In: Note: Flags indicate national team as defined under FIFA eligibility rules; some limited exceptions apply. Players may hold more than one non-FIFA nationality.

No.	Pos.	Nation	Player
75	MF	IRN	Armin Mirdoraghi (from Esteghlal Ahvaz)
42	DF	IRN	Nima Delavari (from Nassaji)
69	DF	IRN	Mahmoud Shaban (from Gol Gohar)
—	FW	IRN	Behnam Beiranvand (from Machine Sazi)
70	DF	IRN	Sajjad Seyfi (from Machine Sazi)
88	MF	IRN	Hadi Imani (from Free agent)
—	FW	IRN	Erfan Maftoolkar (from Giti Pasand Isfahan)
—		IRN	Alireza Ebrahimi (promoted from Academy)
—		IRN	Mohammad Hossein Dehghan (promoted from Academy)
—		IRN	Ali Abbaspour (promoted from Academy)
—		IRN	Ali Salarkhani (from Free agent)

Out: Note: Flags indicate national team as defined under FIFA eligibility rules; some limited exceptions apply. Players may hold more than one non-FIFA nationality.

No.	Pos.	Nation	Player
7	FW	IRN	Shahin Balijayi (to Malavan)
—		IRN	Ramin Esmaeili Asl (Released)

=== Giti Pasand Isfahan ===
In: Note: Flags indicate national team as defined under FIFA eligibility rules; some limited exceptions apply. Players may hold more than one non-FIFA nationality.

No.	Pos.	Nation	Player
—	DF	IRN	Mobin Mirdoraghi (from Esteghlal Ahvaz)
—	MF	IRN	Afshin Esmaeilzadeh (from Mes Kerman)
—	FW	IRN	Esmaeil Farhadi (from Free agent)
—	MF	IRN	Ali Aminorayayi (from Rah Ahan Yazdan)
35	FW	IRN	Mostafa Shojaei (from Mes Kerman)
66	FW	IRN	Mohammad Salsali (from Free agent)
60	GK	IRN	Mahyar Hassannejad (from Free agent)
—		IRN	Nader Mohammadnejad (promoted from Academy)

Out: Note: Flags indicate national team as defined under FIFA eligibility rules; some limited exceptions apply. Players may hold more than one non-FIFA nationality.

No.	Pos.	Nation	Player
7	FW	IRN	Sajjad Ajdar (to Nassaji)
23	FW	IRN	Erfan Maftoolkar (to Foolad Yazd)

=== Gol Gohar Sirjan ===
In: Note: Flags indicate national team as defined under FIFA eligibility rules; some limited exceptions apply. Players may hold more than one non-FIFA nationality.

No.	Pos.	Nation	Player
11	FW	IRN	Mehrdad Avakh (from Aluminium Hormozgan)
—	DF	IRN	Kaveh Zangian (from Aluminium Hormozgan)
99	GK	IRN	Rouzbeh Sinaki (from Machine Sazi)
66	MF	IRN	Mehrdad Abdi (from Parseh)
77	MF	IRN	Hossein Joudaki (from Kheybar Khorramabad)
65	MF	IRN	Hadi Riahi (from Nassaji)
—		IRN	Pouria Tahanzadeh (promoted from Academy)

Out: Note: Flags indicate national team as defined under FIFA eligibility rules; some limited exceptions apply. Players may hold more than one non-FIFA nationality.

No.	Pos.	Nation	Player
3	MF	IRN	Mahmoud Shaban (to Foolad Yazd)
23	FW	IRN	Hossein Hejazian (to Damash)
25	MF	IRN	Milad Amiri (to Kheybar Khorramabad)
32	FW	IRN	Pouya Khavarpour (Released)
92	GK	IRN	Abdolsamad Ahmadi (Released)
44	GK	IRN	Amir Meghdad Maleki (to Aluminium Hormozgan)
20	DF	IRN	Akbar Bakhtiari (to Aluminium Arak)
4	MF	IRN	Mohsen Tarhani (Released)
55	DF	IRN	Alireza Sayyar (Released)
39	MF	IRN	Mehdi Diani (to Moghavemat Tehran – conscription)

=== Iranjavan ===
In: Note: Flags indicate national team as defined under FIFA eligibility rules; some limited exceptions apply. Players may hold more than one non-FIFA nationality.

No.	Pos.	Nation	Player
6	DF	IRN	Mehdi Taheri (from Kargar Boneh Gaz)
99	MF	IRN	Hossein Hejazipour (from Kargar Boneh Gaz)
69	FW	IRN	Ahmad Kia (from Sanat Sari)

Out: Note: Flags indicate national team as defined under FIFA eligibility rules; some limited exceptions apply. Players may hold more than one non-FIFA nationality.

No.	Pos.	Nation	Player
40	MF	IRN	Hamed Amirkhani (to Naft Omidiyeh)
11	FW	IRN	Taghi Nayebi (to Niroo Zamini)

=== Kheybar Khorramabad ===
In: Note: Flags indicate national team as defined under FIFA eligibility rules; some limited exceptions apply. Players may hold more than one non-FIFA nationality.

No.	Pos.	Nation	Player
55	MF	IRN	Majid Houtan (from Free agent)
34	FW	IRN	Shahab Daraei (from Behzisti Khorram Abad)
—	MF	IRN	Amin Beiranvand (from Etehad Aleshtar)
45	MF	IRN	Milad Amiri (from Gol Gohar)
37	MF	IRN	Mohammad Ali Rahimi (from Free agent)
72	MF	IRN	Ali Goudarzi (from Naft MIS)
—		IRN	Homayoun Rad (promoted from Academy)
—		IRN	Ahmad Zarei (promoted from Academy)
—		IRN	Mohammad Hossein Ali Veysi (promoted from Academy)

Out: Note: Flags indicate national team as defined under FIFA eligibility rules; some limited exceptions apply. Players may hold more than one non-FIFA nationality.

No.	Pos.	Nation	Player
11	MF	IRN	Hossein Joudaki (to Gol Gohar)
33	MF	IRN	Ali Sadegh (Released)
—	FW	IRN	Pouya Alikhani (to Oxin Alborz)
16	DF	IRN	Samad Ghobadi (Released)
25	MF	IRN	Amin Mehrzad (Released)
19	MF	IRN	Mohammad Pahlevanpour (to Shahrdari Bandar Abbas)

=== Khoneh Be Khoneh Mazandaran ===
In: Note: Flags indicate national team as defined under FIFA eligibility rules; some limited exceptions apply. Players may hold more than one non-FIFA nationality.

No.	Pos.	Nation	Player
94	FW	IRN	Mohammad Gholami (from Esteghlal Ahvaz)
88	GK	IRN	Iman Sadeghi (from Persepolis)
67	FW	IRN	Soheyl Hezar Jaribi (on loan from Rah Ahan Yazdan)
30	DF	IRN	Mirhani Hashemi (from Tractor Sazi)
14	DF	IRN	Morteza Mansouri (from Esteghlal Ahvaz)
3	MF	IRN	Ghasem Dehnavi (from Saba)
82	FW	IRN	Mohammad Ali Ramezanian (on loan from Rah Ahan Yazdan)

Out: Note: Flags indicate national team as defined under FIFA eligibility rules; some limited exceptions apply. Players may hold more than one non-FIFA nationality.

No.	Pos.	Nation	Player
26	DF	IRN	Mehdi Karbalaei (loan return to Esteghlal)
40	GK	IRN	Sirous Sangchouli (Released)
19	FW	IRN	Ali Choupani (Released)
—	DF	IRN	Omid Khalili (to Parseh)
18	MF	IRN	Mohammad Hosseinpour (Released)
21	DF	IRN	Mohammad Sattari (to Malavan)
22	MF	IRN	Ahmad Mousavi (to Baadraan Gostar)
32	MF	IRN	Mohammad Gorjizadeh (to Parseh)
7	MF	IRN	Milad Jahani (to Sanat Naft)
12	GK	IRN	Ali Mohsenzadeh (loan return to Naft Tehran)

=== Machine Sazi ===
In: Note: Flags indicate national team as defined under FIFA eligibility rules; some limited exceptions apply. Players may hold more than one non-FIFA nationality.

No.	Pos.	Nation	Player
90	FW	IRN	Yousef Seyedi (on loan from Gostaresh Foolad)
35	DF	IRN	Amir Tizrou (from Siah Jamegan)
99	FW	IRN	Mohsen Delir (from Siah Jamegan)
66	DF	IRN	Saeid Mehdipour (from Siah Jamegan)
55	DF	IRN	Mehdi Ghoreishi (from Aluminium Arak)
38	FW	IRN	Reza Etemadi (from Aluminium Arak)
37	GK	IRN	Mehdi Eslami (from Aluminium Arak)
—	GK	IRN	Sajjad Seyyed (from Free agent)
—	GK	IRN	Sajjad Gareili

Out: Note: Flags indicate national team as defined under FIFA eligibility rules; some limited exceptions apply. Players may hold more than one non-FIFA nationality.

No.	Pos.	Nation	Player
1	GK	IRN	Rouzbeh Sinaki (to Gol Gohar)
2	DF	IRN	Vahid Faregh (to Sanat Naft)
9	FW	IRN	Behnam Beiranvand (to Foolad Yazd)
88	MF	IRN	Arash Roshanipour (to Parseh)
12	MF	IRN	Hossein Doustdar (to Sanat Naft)
6	DF	IRN	Sajjad Seyfi (to Foolad Yazd)
33	GK	IRN	Amir Morad Kelari (to Nassaji)
—	MF	IRN	Siamak Dargahi (Released)
—		IRN	Pejman Jahedan (Released)

=== Mes Kerman ===
In: Note: Flags indicate national team as defined under FIFA eligibility rules; some limited exceptions apply. Players may hold more than one non-FIFA nationality.

No.	Pos.	Nation	Player
22	MF	IRN	Milad Jafari (from Esteghlal Ahvaz)
—	MF	IRN	Sadegh Gashni (from Aluminium Arak)
40	MF	IRN	Ehsan Poursheykhali (from Niroo Zamini – conscription return)
50	FW	IRN	Saeid Daghighi (from Gostaresh Foolad)

Out: Note: Flags indicate national team as defined under FIFA eligibility rules; some limited exceptions apply. Players may hold more than one non-FIFA nationality.

No.	Pos.	Nation	Player
99	FW	IRN	Hossein Ghahharpour (to Mes Rafsanjan)
30	MF	IRN	Afshin Esmaeilzadeh (to Giti Pasand)
23	MF	IRN	Edris Kouchaki (to Nassaji)
99	FW	IRN	Mostaf Shojaei (to Giti Pasand)

=== Mes Rafsanjan ===
In: Note: Flags indicate national team as defined under FIFA eligibility rules; some limited exceptions apply. Players may hold more than one non-FIFA nationality.

No.	Pos.	Nation	Player
24	FW	IRN	Hossein Ghahharpour (from Mes Kerman)
88	DF	IRN	Hamed Mahmoudi (from Naft Masjed Soleyman)
25	MF	IRN	Abdollah Mombeyni (from Free agent)
—		IRN	Mahmoud Haj Bagheri (promoted from Academy)
—		IRN	Iman Zare (promoted from Academy)

Out: Note: Flags indicate national team as defined under FIFA eligibility rules; some limited exceptions apply. Players may hold more than one non-FIFA nationality.

No.	Pos.	Nation	Player

=== Naft Masjed Soleyman ===
In: Note: Flags indicate national team as defined under FIFA eligibility rules; some limited exceptions apply. Players may hold more than one non-FIFA nationality.

No.	Pos.	Nation	Player
69	MF	IRN	Mostafa Norouzi (from Free agent)
77	DF	IRN	Saeid Kheradmand (from PAS Hamedan)
70	MF	IRN	Mohsen Azarpad (from PAS Hamedan)
—		IRN	Alireza Ghanbari (promoted from Academy)

Out: Note: Flags indicate national team as defined under FIFA eligibility rules; some limited exceptions apply. Players may hold more than one non-FIFA nationality.

No.	Pos.	Nation	Player
4	DF	IRN	Hamed Mahmoudi (to Mes Rafsanjan)
9	FW	IRN	Mohammad Hadi Yaghoubi (to Paykan)
31	MF	IRN	Masoud Kiamarsi (Released)
28	MF	IRN	Ali Goudarzi (to Kheybar)

=== Nassaji ===
In: Note: Flags indicate national team as defined under FIFA eligibility rules; some limited exceptions apply. Players may hold more than one non-FIFA nationality.

No.	Pos.	Nation	Player
68	MF	IRN	Shahin Majidi (from Esteghlal Ahvaz)
66	DF	IRN	Vahid Hamraz (from Free agent)
70	FW	IRN	Sajjad Ajdar (from Giti Pasand)
—	FW	IRN	Reza Rezaei (from Aluminium Arak)
—	MF	IRN	Abolfazl Razzaghi (promoted from Academy)
27	MF	IRN	Hassan Ghasemi (from Shahrdari Kashan)
40	MF	IRN	Edris Kouchaki (from Mes Kerman)
—	GK	IRN	Amir Morad Kelari (from Machine Sazi)
—		IRN	Houman Amani (promoted from Academy)
—		IRN	Elyas Ghorbanpour (promoted from Academy)
—		IRN	Mehdi Mahmoudi (promoted from Academy)
—		IRN	Amir Ramezanzadeh (promoted from Academy)

Out: Note: Flags indicate national team as defined under FIFA eligibility rules; some limited exceptions apply. Players may hold more than one non-FIFA nationality.

No.	Pos.	Nation	Player
4	DF	IRN	Fariborz Gerami (to Padideh)
3	DF	IRN	Nima Delavari (to Foolad Yazd)
72	MF	IRN	Morteza Khodabakhshi (Released)
24	MF	IRN	Mohammad Ali Ebrahimi (Released)
30	GK	IRN	Abbas Bakhtiari (Released)
19	MF	IRN	Hadi Riahi (to Gol Gohar)
44	DF	IRN	Alireza Jalili (Released)
99	FW	IRN	Shahin Nejat (to Fajr Sepasi)

=== Parseh Tehran ===
In: Note: Flags indicate national team as defined under FIFA eligibility rules; some limited exceptions apply. Players may hold more than one non-FIFA nationality.

No.	Pos.	Nation	Player
61	GK	IRN	Mehrdad Bashagardi (from Foolad)
2	MF	IRN	Mohammad Gorjizadeh (from Khouneh Be Khouneh)
28	DF	IRN	Omid Khalili (from Khouneh Be Khouneh)
19	MF	IRN	Hassan Ramezani (from Free agent)
84	DF	IRN	Sadegh Eskandari (from Free agent)
85	MF	IRN	Arash Roshanipour (from Machine Sazi)
25	FW	IRN	Ardalan Kalvani (from Free agent)
—		IRN	Hossein Abarghouei (promoted from Academy)
44	MF	IRN	Mehdi Salmani (promoted from Academy)
—	GK	IRN	Mohammad Moein Sandoughi (promoted from Academy)

Out: Note: Flags indicate national team as defined under FIFA eligibility rules; some limited exceptions apply. Players may hold more than one non-FIFA nationality.

No.	Pos.	Nation	Player
6	MF	IRN	Mehrdad Abdi (to Gol Gohar)
69	DF	IRN	Hamed Azimi (Haf Semnan)
20	MF	IRN	Mohammad Sadegh Taheri (to Aluminium Hormozgan)
1	GK	IRN	Mohammad Bagher Shabani (to Aluminium Hormozgan)

=== PAS Hamedan ===
In: Note: Flags indicate national team as defined under FIFA eligibility rules; some limited exceptions apply. Players may hold more than one non-FIFA nationality.

No.	Pos.	Nation	Player
55	DF	IRN	Navid Khosh Hava (from Paykan)
77	MF	IRN	Ahmad Jamshidian (from Free agent)
70	MF	IRN	Davoud Shahvaraghi (from Shahrdari Ardabil)
99	GK	IRN	Masoud Khazaeifard (from Aluminium Hormozgan)
62	DF	IRN	Majid Gholamnejad (from Free agent)
—	FW	IRN	Touraj Jafari (from Pars Tehran)

Out: Note: Flags indicate national team as defined under FIFA eligibility rules; some limited exceptions apply. Players may hold more than one non-FIFA nationality.

No.	Pos.	Nation	Player
33	DF	IRN	Rouhollah Soltani (Released)
10	FW	IRN	Jahangir Asgari (Released)
7	MF	IRN	Rasoul Pirzadeh (to Shahrdari Tabriz)
5	DF	IRN	Peyman Namvar (Released)
14	MF	IRN	Mahmoud Mohammadi (Released)
—	MF	IRN	Soroush Nasseri (Caspian Qazvin)
6	MF	IRN	Eshagh Sobhani (to Aluminium Arak)
17	DF	IRN	Saeid Kheradmand (to Naft Masjed Soleyman)
20	MF	IRN	Mohsen Azarpad (to Naft Masjed Soleyman)
1	GK	IRN	Masoud Homami (to Tractor Sazi)
—	MF	IRN	Milad Salehi (to Aluminium Hormozgan)

=== Paykan ===
In: Note: Flags indicate national team as defined under FIFA eligibility rules; some limited exceptions apply. Players may hold more than one non-FIFA nationality.

No.	Pos.	Nation	Player
47	DF	IRN	Saeed Ghezelagchi (from Esteghlal Ahvaz)
23	DF	IRN	Ramtin Soleymanzadeh (from Esteghlal Khuzestan, previously at Fajr Sepasi – conscription)
69	FW	IRN	Hossein Maleki (from Foolad)
99	FW	IRN	Reza Norouzi (from Saipa)
38	FW	IRN	Mohammad Hadi Yaghoubi (from Naft MIS)
—	DF	IRN	Reza Amiri (from Free agent)
55	DF	IRN	Mehdi Hosseinzadeh (promoted from Academy)
27	DF	IRN	Ali Abbasi (promoted from Academy)
45	FW	IRN	Yahya Najjarian (promoted from Academy)

Out: Note: Flags indicate national team as defined under FIFA eligibility rules; some limited exceptions apply. Players may hold more than one non-FIFA nationality.

No.	Pos.	Nation	Player
2	DF	IRN	Navid Khosh Hava (to PAS Hamedan)
18	MF	IRN	Rasoul Soroushnia (to Aluminium Arak)
1	GK	IRN	Ahmad Arabpour (Released)
70	MF	UZB	Oybek Kilichev (to (Uzbekistan) Pakhtakor)

=== Sanat Naft ===
In: Note: Flags indicate national team as defined under FIFA eligibility rules; some limited exceptions apply. Players may hold more than one non-FIFA nationality.

No.	Pos.	Nation	Player
30	FW	IRN	Akbar Saghiri (from Aluminium Hormozgan)
38	FW	IRN	Hamid Taherifard (from Moghavemat Tehran – conscription return)
27	MF	IRN	Milad Jahani (from Khouneh Be Khouneh)
29	MF	IRN	Hossein Doustdar (from Machine Sazi)
77	FW	IRN	Peyman Miri (from Siah Jamegan)
25	DF	IRN	Vahid Faregh (from Machine Sazi)
26	DF	IRN	Aram Abbasi (from Padideh)
—	MF	IRN	Masoud Bohrani (from Free agent)

Out: Note: Flags indicate national team as defined under FIFA eligibility rules; some limited exceptions apply. Players may hold more than one non-FIFA nationality.

No.	Pos.	Nation	Player
18	MF	IRN	Saeid Ghadami (to Damash)
19	MF	IRN	Yaser Vakili (Released)

=== Shahrdari Ardabil ===
In: Note: Flags indicate national team as defined under FIFA eligibility rules; some limited exceptions apply. Players may hold more than one non-FIFA nationality.

No.	Pos.	Nation	Player
44	DF	IRN	Shahriyar Shirvand (from Free agent)
3	FW	IRN	Mehran Jafari (from Free agent)
66	MF	IRN	Reza Maghouli (from Free agent)
16	DF	IRN	Farhad Nouri (from Shahrdari Tabriz)
13	FW	IRN	Mohammad Nozhati (from Malavan)
70	DF	IRN	Mohammad Borjlou (from Free agent)
—	MF	IRN	Behzad Ajdari (promoted from Academy)
—	FW	IRN	Jalal Sotudeh (promoted from Academy)
—		IRN	Mehran Ghadiri (promoted from Academy)
—	FW	IRN	Mohsen Mohsenzadeh (promoted from Academy)
—	FW	IRN	Siavash Nikkhou (promoted from Academy)
—		IRN	Erfan Vesal (promoted from Academy)
—		IRN	Amir Reza Keramati (promoted from Academy)

Out: Note: Flags indicate national team as defined under FIFA eligibility rules; some limited exceptions apply. Players may hold more than one non-FIFA nationality.

No.	Pos.	Nation	Player
25	DF	IRN	Mehran Mousavi (to Rah Ahan Yazdan)
7	MF	IRN	Mehdi Torkaman (Released)
17	DF	IRN	Rouhollah Nemati (to Baadraan Gostar)
30	DF	IRN	Hossein Habibi (to Baadraan Gostar)
31	GK	IRN	Vahid Asgharzadeh (to Baadraan Gostar)
32	MF	IRN	Davoud Shahvaraghi (to PAS Hamedan)
77	MF	IRN	Bahman Yousefi (Released)
99	FW	IRN	Ebrahim Kouh Afkan (to Baadraan Gostar)
