= 2015–16 Hazfi Cup =

Jame Azadsazi Khorramshahr

Tournament details
- Country: Iran
- Dates: 27 August 2015 – 29 May 2016
- Teams: 80

Final positions
- Champions: Zob Ahan (4th title)
- Runners-up: Esteghlal

Tournament statistics
- Matches played: 36
- Goals scored: 114 (3.17 per match)
- Top goal scorer(s): (Iran) Sajjad Shahbazzadeh (Iran) Ali Cheraghi (4 goals each)

The 2015–16 Hazfi Cup was the 29th season of the Iranian football knockout competition. Zob Ahan Isfahan was the defending champion. The competition started on 27 August 2015 and the final was played on 29 May 2016.
Zob Ahan won the tournament for the second time in a row after defeating Esteghlal in the final.

== Participating teams ==
A total of 80 teams participated in the 2015–16 season. The teams were divided into two main groups, including 16 teams of Iran Premier League, with 64 teams of Azadegan League, Iran 2nd Division League, and Provincial Leagues.

== First stage ==
In the first stage of "2015–16 Hazfi Cup", 64 teams presented. In this stage one round played, and finally, 16 teams qualified for the second stage.

=== First round ===
27 August 2015 1	Sherkate Khalkhal Dasht	(w/o)	Safir Qazvin	Khalkhal
17:30 DST+03:30				Stadium: Takhti Khalkhal Stadium
Note: Khalkhal Dasht withdrew

27 August 2015 2	Damash Gilan	(w/o)	Moghavemat Tehran	Rasht
17:30 DST+03:30				Stadium: Azodi Stadium
Note: Damash Gilan withdrew

27 August 2015 3	Naft va Gaz Gachsaran	(w/o)	Amir Kabir Noorabad	Gachsaran
17:30 DST+03:30				Stadium: Naft Gachsaran Stadium
Note: Naft va Gaz Gachsaran withdrew

27 August 2015 4	Kara Shiraz	(w/o)	Shahrdari Kamyaran	Shiraz
17:30 DST+03:30				Stadium: Hafezieh Stadium
Note: Shahrdari Kamyaran withdrew

27 August 2015 5	Mantagheye Azad Kish	(w/o)	Rahpouyan Rezvanshahr	Kish
17:30 DST+03:30				Stadium: Kish Stadium
Note: Rahpouyan Rezvanshahr withdrew

27 August 2015 6	Hamun Sazeh	(w/o)	Naft Omidiyeh	Zahedan
17:30 DST+03:30				Stadium: Zahedan Stadium
Note: Naft Omidiyeh withdrew

27 August 2015 7	Sepidrood Rasht	(w/o)	Aboumoslem	Rasht
17:30 DST+03:30				Stadium: Dr. Azodi
Note: Aboumoslem withdrew

27 August 2015 8	Shahrdari Mahshahr	(w/o)	Montakhab Arak	Mahshahr
17:30 DST+03:30				Stadium: Mahshahr Stadium
Note: Montakhab Arak withdrew

27 August 2015 9	Montakhab Birjand	(w/o)	Kowsar Mehran Ilam	Birjand
17:30 DST+03:30				Stadium: Birjand Stadium
Note: Montakhab Birjand withdrew

27 August 2015 10	Baderan Tehran	2–0	Shahin Ameri	Tehran
17:30 DST+03:30				Stadium: Daneshgah Tehran Stadium

27 August 2015 11	Omid Razakan Alborz	2–1	Haf Semnan	Karaj
17:30 DST+03:30				Stadium: Enghelab Stadium

27 August 2015 12	Esteghlal Javan Saveh	(w/o)	Kargar Boneh Gaz	Saveh
17:30 DST+03:30				Stadium: Saveh Stadium
Note: Kargar Boneh Gaz withdrew

27 August 2015 13	Abouzar Basht	(w/o)	Oghab Tehran	Basht
17:30 DST+03:30				Stadium: Basht Stadium
Note: Abouzar Basht withdrew

27 August 2015 14	Montakhab Bojnord	(w/o)	Sanat Sari	Bojnord
17:30 DST+03:30				Stadium: Bojnord Stadium
Note: Montakhab Bojnord withdrew

27 August 2015 15	Paykan	(w/o)	Shahrdari Bandar Abbas	Tehran
17:30 DST+03:30				Stadium: Dastgerdi Stadium
Note: Shahrdari Bandar Abbas withdrew

27 August 2015 16	Montakhab Khorramabad	(w/o)	Khoneh Be Khoneh	Khorramabad
17:30 DST+03:30				Stadium: Khorramabad Stadium
Note: Khoneh Be Khoneh withdrew

27 August 2015 17	Diana Baqershahr	4–1	Abidar Sanandaj	Baqershahr
17:30 DST+03:30				Stadium: Baqershahr Stadium

27 August 2015 18	Alvand Hamedan	(w/o)	Aluminium Arak	Hamedan
17:30 DST+03:30				Stadium: Hamedan Stadium
Note: Aluminium Arak withdrew

27 August 2015 19	Ansar Bafq	(w/o)	Payam Ardehal	Bafq
17:30 DST+03:30				Stadium: Bafq Stadium
Note: Ansar Bafgh withdrew

27 August 2015 20	Esteghlal B Tehran	1–2	Shahrdari Kashan	Tehran
17:30 DST+03:30				Stadium: Huveizeh Tehran Stadium

27 August 2015 21	Tarbiat Novin	(w/o)	Shahrdari Semnan	Yazd
17:30 DST+03:30				Stadium: Nassiri Stadium
Note: Tarbiat Yazd withdrew

27 August 2015 22	Caspian Qazvin	(w/o)	Rahian Kermanshah	Qazvin
17:30 DST+03:30				Stadium: Qazvin Stadium
Note: Caspian Qazvin withdrew

27 August 2015 23	Isar Jiroft	(w/o)	Sanat Naft Novin	Jiroft
17:30 DST+03:30				Stadium: Jiroft Stadium
Note: Naft Novin withdrew

27 August 2015 24	Montakhab Urmia	(w/o)	Shirin Faraz Aqqala	Urmia
17:30 DST+03:30				Stadium: Urmia Stadium
Note: Montakhab Urmia withdrew

27 August 2015 25	Montakhab Qom	(w/o)	Arad Isfahan	Qom
17:30 DST+03:30				Stadium: Qom Stadium
Note: Arad Isfahan withdrew

27 August 2015 26	Niroo Zamini	(w/o)	Kadous Masal Gilan	Tehran
17:30 DST+03:30				Stadium: Ekbatan Stadium
Note: Kadous Masal Gilan withdrew

27 August 2015 27	Persepolis Ganaveh	(w/o)	Etka Gorgan	Ganaveh
17:30 DST+03:30				Stadium: Shahid Seraji Stadium
Note: Etka Gorgan withdrew

27 August 2015 28	Be'sat Kermanshah	(w/o)	Shahrdari Zanjan	Kermanshah
17:30 DST+03:30				Stadium: Azadi Kermanshah Stadium
Note: Be'sat Kermanshah withdrew

27 August 2015 29	Payam Mashhad	(w/o)	Shahrdari Urmia	Mashhad
17:30 DST+03:30				Stadium: Takhti Stadium
Note: Shahrdari Urmia withdrew

27 August 2015 30	Bazargani Vashta Amol	(w/o)	Pars Jam Bushehr	Amol
17:30 DST+03:30				Stadium: Amol Stadium
Note: Pars Jam withdrew

27 August 2015 31	Shahrdari Tabriz	(w/o)	Karun Khuzestan	Tabriz
17:30 DST+03:30				Stadium: Marzdaran Stadium
Note: Shahrdari Tabriz withdrew

27 August 2015 32	Montakhab Semnan	(w/o)	Shahrdari Jouybar	Semnan
17:30 DST+03:30				Stadium: Semnan Stadium
Note: Montakhab Semnan withdrew

=== Second round ===
2 September 2015 33	Safir Qazvin	(w/o)	Moghavemat Tehran	Qazvin
17:30 DST+03:30				Stadium: Qazvin Stadium
Note: Moghavemat Tehran withdrew

2 September 2015 34	Amir Kabir Noorabad	0–2	Kara Shiraz	Nurabad
17:30 DST+03:30				Stadium: Noorabad Stadium

2 September 2015 35	Mantagheye Azad Kish	(w/o)	Hamun Sazeh	Kish
17:30 DST+03:30				Stadium: Kish Stadium
Note: Hamun Sazeh withdrew

2 September 2015 36	Sepidrood Rasht	(w/o)	Shahrdari Mahshahr	Rasht
17:30 DST+03:30				Stadium: Azodi Stadium
Note: Shahrdari Mahshahr withdrew

2 September 2015 37	Baderan Tehran	10–0	Kowsar Mehran Ilam	Tehran
17:30 DST+03:30				Stadium: Kargaran Stadium

2 September 2015 38	Omid Razakan Alborz	(w/o)	Esteghlal Javan Saveh	Karaj
17:30 DST+03:30				Stadium: Enghelab Stadium
Note: Esteghlal Javan Saveh withdrew

2 September 2015 39	Oghab Tehran	(w/o)	Sanat Sari	Tehran
17:30 DST+03:30				Stadium: Takhti Stadium
Note: Sanat Sari withdrew

2 September 2015 40	Paykan	(w/o)	Montakhab Khorramabad	Tehran
17:30 DST+03:30				Stadium: Ekbatan Stadium
Note: Montakhab Khorramabad withdrew

2 September 2015 41	Diana Baqershahr	(w/o)	Alvand Hamedan	Baqershahr
17:30 DST+03:30				Stadium: Baqershahr Stadium
Note: Alvand Hamedan withdrew

2 September 2015 42	Shahrdari Kashan	2–0	Payam Ardehal	Kashan
17:30 DST+03:30				Stadium: Kashan Stadium

2 September 2015 43	Shahrdari Semnan	(w/o)	Rahian Kermanshah	Semnan, Iran
17:30 DST+03:30				Stadium: Semnan Stadium
Note: Rahian Kermanshah withdrew

2 September 2015 44	Isar Jiroft	2–0	Shirin Faraz Aqqala	Jiroft
17:30 DST+03:30				Stadium: Jiroft Stadium

2 September 2015 45	Niroo Zamini	(w/o)	Montakhab Qom	Tehran
17:30 DST+03:30				Stadium: Artesh Stadium
Note: Montakhab Qom withdrew

2 September 2015 46	Be'sat Kermanshah	(w/o)	Persepolis Ganaveh	Kermanshah
17:30 DST+03:30				Stadium: Kermanshah Stadium
Note: Persepolis Ganaveh withdrew

2 September 2015 47	Bazargani Vashta Amol	(w/o)	Payam Mashhad	Amol
17:30 DST+03:30				Stadium: Amol Stadium
Note: Payam Mashhad withdrew

2 September 2015 48	Karun Khuzestan	(w/o)	Shahrdari Jouybar	Ahvaz
17:30 DST+03:30				Stadium: Takhti Stadium
Note: Shahrdari Jouybar withdrew

== Second stage ==
The 16 teams from Persian Gulf Pro League are entered to competition from the second stage.

=== Bracket ===
Round of 32
H	Sepahan	4
A	Safir Qazvin	0
H	Esteghlal Ahvaz	2(5)
A	Kara Shiraz	2(6)
H	Rah Ahan	5
A	Mantagheye Azad Kish	1
H	Esteghlal Khuzestan	(w/o)
A	Sepidrood Rasht
H	Zob Ahan	2
A	Baderan Tehran	1
H	Gostaresh Foulad	2
A	Omid Razakan Alborz	0
H	Malavan	3
A	Oghab Tehran	1
H	Persepolis	1
A	Paykan	0
H	Naft Tehran	5
A	Diana Baqershahr	1
H	Padideh	4
A	Shahrdari Kashan	1
H	Esteghlal	5
A	Shahrdari Semnan	0
H	Foolad	6
A	Isar Jiroft	0
H	Saba Qom	2
A	Niroo Zamini	1
H	Tractor Sazi	(w/o)
A	Be'sat Kermanshah
H	Saipa	4
A	Bazargani Amol	0
H	Siah Jamegan	(w/o)
A	Karun Khuzestan

Round of 16
A	Sepahan	3
H	Kara Shiraz	1
H	Rah Ahan	1
A	Esteghlal Khuzestan	0
A	Zob Ahan	1
H	Gostaresh Foulad	0
A	Malavan	0
H	Persepolis	1
A	Naft Tehran	1(4)
H	Padideh	1(2)
H	Esteghlal	3
A	Foolad	1
H	Saba Qom	0
A	Tractor Sazi	1
A	Saipa	0(3)
H	Siah Jamegan	0(1)

Quarter-Final
H	Sepahan	2
A	Rah Ahan	0
H	Zob Ahan	2
A	Persepolis	0
H	Naft Tehran	1(4)
A	Esteghlal	1(5)
A	Tractor Sazi	2
H	Saipa	1

Semi-Final
A	Sepahan	2(1)
H	Zob Ahan	2(4)
A	Esteghlal	2
H	Tractor Sazi	1

Final
-	Zob Ahan	1(5)
-	Esteghlal	1(4)

Note: H: Home team, A: Away team

=== Third round ===
9 September 2015 49	Padideh	4–1	Shahrdari Kashan	Mashhad
16:30 DST+03:30	Shakeri 45', 70' (pen.), 89'; Yousefi 62'		Farzaneh 76'	Stadium: Samen Stadium

9 September 2015 50	Malavan	3–1	Oghab Tehran	Anzali
17:00 DST+03:30	Rafkhaei 11'; Zare 28'; Razipour 86'		Ghasemi 59' (pen.)	Stadium: Takhti Stadium; Attendance: 1,500

10 September 2015 51	Siah Jamegan	(w/o)	Karun Khuzestan	Mashhad
16:30 DST+03:30				Stadium: Samen Stadium
Note: Karun Khuzestan withdrew

10 September 2015 52	Gostaresh Foulad	2–0	Omid Razakan Alborz	Tabriz
16:30 DST+03:30				Stadium: Gostaresh Foulad Stadium

10 September 2015 53	Esteghlal Khuzestan	(w/o)	Sepidrood Rasht	Ahvaz
18:45 DST+03:30				Stadium: Ghadir Stadium
Note: Sepidrood Rasht withdrew

10 September 2015 54	Saba Qom	2–1	Niroo Zamini	Qom
18:45 DST+03:30				Stadium: Yadegar-e Emam Stadium

11 September 2015 55	Rah Ahan	5–1	Mantagheye Azad Kish	Qods
16:30 DST+03:30				Stadium: Shahre Qods Stadium

11 September 2015 56	Sepahan	4–0	Safir Qazvin	Isfahan
16:30 DST+03:30

11 September 2015 57	Esteghlal	5–0	Shahrdari Semnan	Tehran
18:30 DST+03:30	S. Shahbazzadeh 22', 46'; P. Pejić 65', 75'; M.Fakhreddini 80'; A. Ramezani (yellow card) 29'	report	M. Kamranpour (yellow card) 45+3'	Stadium: Takhti Stadium; Attendance: 3,000; Referee: Seyyed Reza Mahdavi

11 September 2015 58	Zob Ahan	2–1	Baderan Tehran	Isfahan
18:45 DST+03:30				Stadium: Foolad Shahr Stadium

11 September 2015 59	Foolad	6–0	Isar Jiroft	Ahvaz
18:45 DST+03:30				Stadium: Ghadir Stadium

11 September 2015 60	Tractor Sazi	(w/o)	Be'sat Kermanshah	Tabriz
				Stadium: Yadegar-e Emam Stadium
Note: Be'sat Kermanshah withdrew

12 September 2015 61	Saipa	4–0	Bazargani Vashta Amol	Tehran
17:30 DST+03:30	Ramezani 27'; Zeynali 42', 64'; Norouzi 88' (pen.)			Stadium: Shahid Dastgerdi Stadium

12 September 2015 62	Persepolis	1–0	Paykan	Tehran
18:40 DST+03:30	Taremi 68' (pen.)			Stadium: Azadi Stadium; Attendance: 6,800; Referee: Payam heydari

13 September 2015 63	Esteghlal Ahvaz	2–2 (5–6 p)	Kara Shiraz	Ahvaz
18:45 DST+03:30				Stadium: Ghadir Stadium

64	Naft Tehran	5–1	Diana Baqershahr	Tehran
DST+03:30		report		Stadium: Takhti Stadium

=== Fourth round ===
19 September 2015 65	Kara Shiraz	1–3	Sepahan	Shiraz
16:30	Cheraghi 51'		Sharifi 11', 23'; Navidkia 90'	Stadium: Hafezieh Stadium; Attendance: 5,000

19 September 2015 66	Rah Ahan	1–0	Esteghlal Khuzestan	Qods
17:00	Strandvall 22'			Stadium: Shahre Qods Stadium

20 September 2015 67	Siah Jamegan	0–0 (1–3 p)	Saipa	Mashhad
				Stadium: Samen Stadium

20 September 2015 68	Saba Qom	0–1	Tractor Sazi	Qom
			Younés 81' (pen.)	Stadium: Yadegar-e Emam Stadium; Attendance: 1,500

20 September 2015 69	Persepolis	1–0	Malavan	Tehran
	Taremi 100'			Stadium: Azadi Stadium; Attendance: 15,000

21 September 2015 70	Gostaresh Foulad	0–1	Zob Ahan	Tabriz
16:00 (DST+03:30)			M. Rajabzadeh 66'	Stadium: Gostaresh Foulad Stadium

4 November 2015 71	Esteghlal	3–1	Foolad	Tehran
18:00 (DST+03:30)	M. Majidi 15'; H. Omranzadeh 20'; J. Ansari 77'	report	E. Sharifat 3'	Stadium: Azadi Stadium; Attendance: 5,000; Referee: Ashkan Khorshidi

4 November 2015 72	Padideh	1–1 (2–4 p)	Naft Tehran	Mashhad
14:30 (DST+03:30)	M. Yousefi 54'	report	I. Alekasir 42'	Stadium: Samen Stadium; Attendance: 500; Referee: Alireza Faghani

=== Quarter-Final ===
5 November 2015 73	Sepahan	2–0 (a.e.t.)	Rah Ahan	Isfahan
15:00 (DST+03:30)	A. Karimi 94'; M. Sharifi 111'	report		Stadium: Foolad Shahr Stadium; Attendance: 5,000; Referee: MohammadReza Akbarian

4 November 2015 74	Zob Ahan	2–0 (a.e.t.)	Persepolis	Isfahan
14:30 (DST+03:30)	M. Tabrizi 107'; R. Shekari 115'	report		Stadium: Foolad Shahr Stadium; Attendance: 15,000; Referee: Yadollah Jahanbazi

4 November 2015 75	Saipa	1–2	Tractor Sazi	Tehran
15:00 (DST+03:30)	A. Zeinali 34'	report	H. Younés 8'; S. Saghebi 66'	Stadium: Shahid Dastgerdi Stadium; Attendance: 400; Referee: Bijan Heidari

25 November 2015 76	Naft Tehran	1–1 (4–5 p)	Esteghlal	Tehran
15:20 (DST+03:30)	S. Lotfi 90+2'	report	M. Daneshgar 45+1' (o.g.)	Stadium: Takhti Stadium; Attendance: 1,500; Referee: Shahin Haj Babaei

=== Semi-final ===
24 November 2015 77	Zob Ahan	2–2 (4–1 p)	Sepahan	Isfahan
14:30 (DST+03:30)	M. Tabrizi 2'; M.R. Hosseini 110'	report	V. Ghafouri 52', 113'	Stadium: Foolad Shahr Stadium; Attendance: 7,000; Referee: Mohsen Torky

22 December 2015 78	Tractor Sazi	1–2	Esteghlal	Tabriz
14:30 (DST+03:30)	Augusto 49'	report	Shahbazzadeh 29', 52'	Stadium: Yadegar-e Emam Stadium; Attendance: 15,000; Referee: Hossein Zargar

=== Final ===
29 May 2016 79	Zob Ahan	1–1 (5–4 p)	Esteghlal	Khorramshahr
21:00 (DST+03:30)	Rahmati 20' (o.g.)	report	Ebrahimi 56' (pen.)	Stadium: Khorramshahr Stadium; Attendance: 15,000; Referee: Alireza Faghani

== Top scorers ==
Rank	Player	Club	Goals
1	(Iran) Sajjad Shahbazzadeh	Esteghlal	4
1	(Iran) Issa Alekasir	Naft Tehran	4
1	(Iran) Ali Cheraghi	Kara Shiraz	4
2	(Iran) Ali Zeinali	Saipa	3
2	(Iran) Mehdi Sharifi	Sepahan	3
2	(Iran) Younes Shakeri	Padideh	3
2	(Iran) Mehdi Daghagheleh	Foolad	3
2	(Iran) Mohammad Ebadzadeh	Baderan Tehran	3
2	(Iran) Mostafa Cheraghi	Baderan Tehran	3
2	(Iran) Qasem Dehkouei	Diana Baqershahr	3

Last updated: 29 May 2016
Source: hazfi-cup.com

== See also ==
- Iran Pro League 2015–16
- Azadegan League 2015–16
- Iran Football's 2nd Division 2015–16
- Iran Football's 3rd Division 2015–16
- Iranian Super Cup
- Futsal Super League 2015–16
