= Hamun Sazeh F.C. =

Iranian football club

Hamun Sazeh
- Full name: Hamun Sazehl Football Club
- Founded: 2014; 3 years ago
- Ground: Zahedan Stadium
- Capacity: 15,000
- League: Iran Football's 2nd Division
- 2014–15: TBD

Hamun Sazeh Football Club is an Iranian football club based in Zahedan. They currently compete in the Iran Football's 2nd Division.

== Season-by-Season ==
The table below shows the achievements of the club in various competitions.

Season	League	Position	Hazfi Cup	Notes
2014–15	2nd Division		Did not qualify

== See also ==
- 2014–15 Iran Football's 2nd Division
