= Mohammad Roshandel =

Iranian footballer

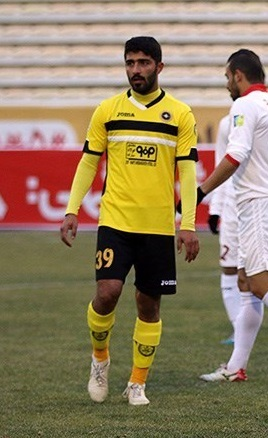

Personal information
- Date of birth: 2 July 1995 (age 31)
- Place of birth: Kordkuy, Iran
- Height: 1.81 m (5 ft 11 1/2 in)
- Position: Right back

Team information
- Current team: Shohada Babolsar
- Number: 55

Youth career
- 2005–2011: Etka Gorgan
- 2012–2014: Sepahan

Senior career*
Years	Team	Apps	(Gls)
2014–2017	Sepahan	14	(0)
2017–2019	Malavan	2	(0)
2019–2020	Sepidrood		
2020	Elmoadab	6	(0)
2020–2022	Sepahan Novin		
2022–2024	Novin Keshavarz Aliabad		
2024–	Shohada Babolsar		

International career^{‡}
2013–2014	Iran U20	9	(0)
- * Club domestic league appearances and goals as of 16 August 2020 ‡ National team caps and goals as of 9 October 2014

Mohammad Roshandel (Persian: محمد روشند‌ل; born 2 July 1995) is an Iranian football defender who plays for Shohada Babolsar in the League 2.

== Club career ==
Roshandel started his career with Etka Gorgan. Later he joined to Sepahan Academy. In Winter 2014 he promoted to first team and made his professional debut for Sepahan on 16 November 2015 against Siah Jamegan as a starter.

== Club career statistics ==
As of 5 November 2015.

Club	Division	Season	League		Hazfi Cup		Asia		Total	
Club	Division	Season	Apps	Goals	Apps	Goals	Apps	Goals	Apps	Goals
Sepahan	Pro League	2015–16	4	0	3	0	0	0	7	0
Career Totals			4	0	3	0	0	0	7	0
