= Mehdi Karbalaei =

Iranian footballer

Personal information
- Date of birth: 8 March 1993 (age 33)
- Place of birth: Tehran, Iran
- Height: 1.89 m (6 ft 2 1/2 in)
- Position: Defender

Team information
- Current team: Saipa
- Number: 30

Youth career
- 2012–2013: Naft Novin
- 2013–2015: Esteghlal

Senior career*
Years	Team	Apps	(Gls)
2014–2015	Esteghlal	1	(0)
2015–2016	→ Khooneh be Khooneh (loan)	13	(0)
2015–2016	Gostaresh Foulad	5	(0)
2016–2017	Gol Gohar	25	(0)
2017–2018	Malavan	16	(0)
2018–2019	Fajr Sepasi	13	(0)
2019–2020	Mes Rafsanjan	10	(0)
2020–2021	Havadar	5	(0)
2021–2022	Shahin Bushehr	2	(0)
2022–2023	Darya Caspian	26	(0)
2023–2024	Naft va Gaz Gachsaran	28	(0)
2024–	Saipa	27	(0)
- * Club domestic league appearances and goals as of 22 April 2025

Mehdi Karbalaei (Persian: مهدی کربلایی, born 8 March 1993) is an Iranian football defender who plays for Saipa.
