= Arash Roshanipour =

Iranian football midfielder (born 1988)

Personal information
- Full name: Arash Roshanipour
- Date of birth: February 25, 1988 (age 38)
- Place of birth: Tehran, Iran
- Position: Midfielder

Team information
- Current team: Saba Qom

Youth career
- Fajr Tehran
- Persepolis
- Steel Azin

Senior career*
Years	Team	Apps	(Gls)
2008–2010	Steel Azin		
2010–2011	Aboomoslem	25	(7)
2011–2012	Shahrdari Arak	21	(2)
2012–2014	Mes Kerman	31	(0)
2014–	Saba Qom	0	(0)

International career
- Iran U-17
- * Club domestic league appearances and goals as of 10 May 2014

Arash Roshanipour (Persian: آرش روشنی پور; born February 25, 1988) is an Iranian football midfielder, who currently plays for Saba Qom in Iran's Premier Football League.

== Career ==
Roshanipour joined Mes Kerman in summer 2012. He made his debut for Mes Kerman on 17 August, when he was brought on as a substitute.

== Club career statistics ==
As of 17 August 2012

Club performance			League		Cup		Continental		Total	
Season	Club	League	Apps	Goals	Apps	Goals	Apps	Goals	Apps	Goals
Iran			League		Hazfi Cup		Asia		Total	
2008–09	Steel Azin	Division 1					–			
2009–10	Steel Azin	Pro League	0	0	0	0	–		0	0
2010–11	Aboomoslem	Division 1	25	7			–			
2011–12	Shahrdari Arak	Division 1	21	2			–			
2012–13	Mes Kerman	Pro League	1	0	0	0	–		1	0
Career total							0	0		
