= Qaleh-ye Tuq =

Qaleh-ye Tuq قلعه طوق
- Village
- Location within Iran
- Coordinates: 32°22′57″N 48°20′59″E
- Country: Iran
- Province: Khuzestan
- County: Dezful
- Bakhsh: Central
- Rural District: Qeblehi

Population (2006)
  - Total: 1,998
- Time zone: UTC+3:30 (IRST)
  - Summer (DST): UTC+4:30 (IRDT)

Qaleh-ye Tuq (Persian: قلعه طوق, also Romanized as Qal‘eh-ye Ţūq; also known as Ghal‘eh Toogh and Qal‘eh Ţūg) is a village in Qeblehi Rural District, in the Central District of Dezful County, Khuzestan Province, Iran. At the 2006 census, its population was 1,998, in 373 families.
