= Vahid Najafi =

Iranian footballer

Personal information
- Full name: Vahid Najafi Damirchi
- Date of birth: 16 February 1994 (age 32)
- Place of birth: Tehran, Iran
- Height: 1.81 m (5 ft 11 in)
- Position: Forward

Youth career
- 2006–2007: PAS Tehran
- 2007–2015: Saipa
- 2013–2015: → Moghavemat (loan)

Senior career*
Years	Team	Apps	(Gls)
2015–2016	Sepahan	4	(0)
2017	Naft Tehran	1	(0)
2017–2018	Rah Ahan	14	(2)
2018–2019	Be'sat Kermanshah		
2019–2020	Sardar Bukan		
2021	PAS Hamedan		
2021–2023	Ario Eslamshahr		
2023–2024	Shahin Tehran		
- * Club domestic league appearances and goals as of 29 April 2018

Vahid Najafi Damirchi (Persian: وحيد نجفی; born 16 February 1994) is an Iranian footballer who plays as a forward.

== Club career statistics ==
As of 31 July 2015

Club performance			League		Cup		Continental		Total	
Season	Club	League	Apps	Goals	Apps	Goals	Apps	Goals	Apps	Goals
Iran			League		Hazfi Cup		Asia		Total	
2015–16	Sepahan	Iran Pro League	3	0	3	0	0	0	6	0
Career total			3	0	3	0	0	0	6	0
