= Nima Delavari =

Iranian football defender

Personal information
- Full name: Nima Delavari
- Date of birth: September 17, 1991 (age 35)
- Place of birth: Hashtpar, Iran
- Height: 1.88 m (6 ft 2 in)
- Position: Defender

Team information
- Current team: Nassaji
- Number: 3

Youth career
- 2004–2006: Mehravaran Talesh
- 2006–2008: Shahrdari Talesh
- 2008–2011: Malavan

Senior career*
Years	Team	Apps	(Gls)
2011–2015	Malavan	12	(0)
2015	Shahrdari Bandar Abbas	8	(0)
2015–	Nassaji Mazandaran	9	(0)
2016	Foolad Yazd	?	(?)
2016-2017	Sepidrood Rasht	?	(?)
2017-2018	Mes Rafsanjan	?	(?)
2018-2019	Chooka Talesh	?	(?)
2019-2021	Shahid Ghandi	?	(?)
2021-	Chooka Talesh	?	(?)
- * Club domestic league appearances and goals as of 25 April 2015

Nima Delavari (Persian: نیما دلاوری) is an Iranian football defender who plays for Chooka Talesh in League 2

== Club career ==
=== Malavan ===
He started his career with Mehravarn Talesh youth levels. Later he joined to Malavan Academy and spent three season with Malavan youth levels. He joined to first team by Farhad Pourgholami and made his debut for Malavan in 2013–14 Iran Pro League against Saba Qom as a starter.

== Club career statistics ==
As of 15 August 2014.

Club	Division	Season	League		Hazfi Cup		Asia		Total	
Club	Division	Season	Apps	Goals	Apps	Goals	Apps	Goals	Apps	Goals
Malavan	Pro League	2011–12	0	0	0	0	–	–	0	0
Malavan	Pro League	2012–13	0	0	0	0	–	–	0	0
Malavan	Pro League	2013–14	3	0	1	0	–	–	4	0
Malavan	Pro League	2014–15	3	0	0	0	–	–	3	0
Career Totals			6	0	1	0	0	0	7	0
