= Mostafa Ghanbarizadeh =

Iranian footballer

Personal information
- Date of birth: 1 December 1995 (age 30)
- Place of birth: Ahvaz, Iran
- Height: 1.72 m (5 ft 8 in)
- Position: Midfielder

Youth career
- 2012–2014: Karun Khuzestan
- 2014–2015: Foolad
- 2015–2017: Esteghlal Khuzestan

Senior career*
Years	Team	Apps	(Gls)
2015–2017	Esteghlal Khuzestan	4	(0)
2018	Pars Jonoubi Jam	0	(0)
2019–2020	Malavan	0	(0)
2022–2023	Shahin Bushehr		
- * Club domestic league appearances and goals

Mostafa Ghanbarizadeh (Persian: مصطفی قنبری‌زاده; born 1 December 1995) is an Iranian former football midfielder.

== Club career ==
Ghanbarizadeh joined Esteghlal Khuzestan in summer 2015. He made his debut for them on 26 October 2015 against Esteghlal Ahvaz as a substitute for Hamdollah Ebdam.

== Club career statistics ==
As of 26 October 2015

Club	Division	Season	League		Hazfi Cup		Asia		Total	
Club	Division	Season	Apps	Goals	Apps	Goals	Apps	Goals	Apps	Goals
Esteghlal Kh.	Pro League	2015–16	1	0	0	0	–	–	1	0
Career Totals			1	0	0	0	0	0	1	0

== Honours ==
Esteghlal Khuzestan

- Iran Pro League (1): 2015–16
- Iranian Super Cup runner-up: 2016
