= Abdollah Karami =

Iranian footballer

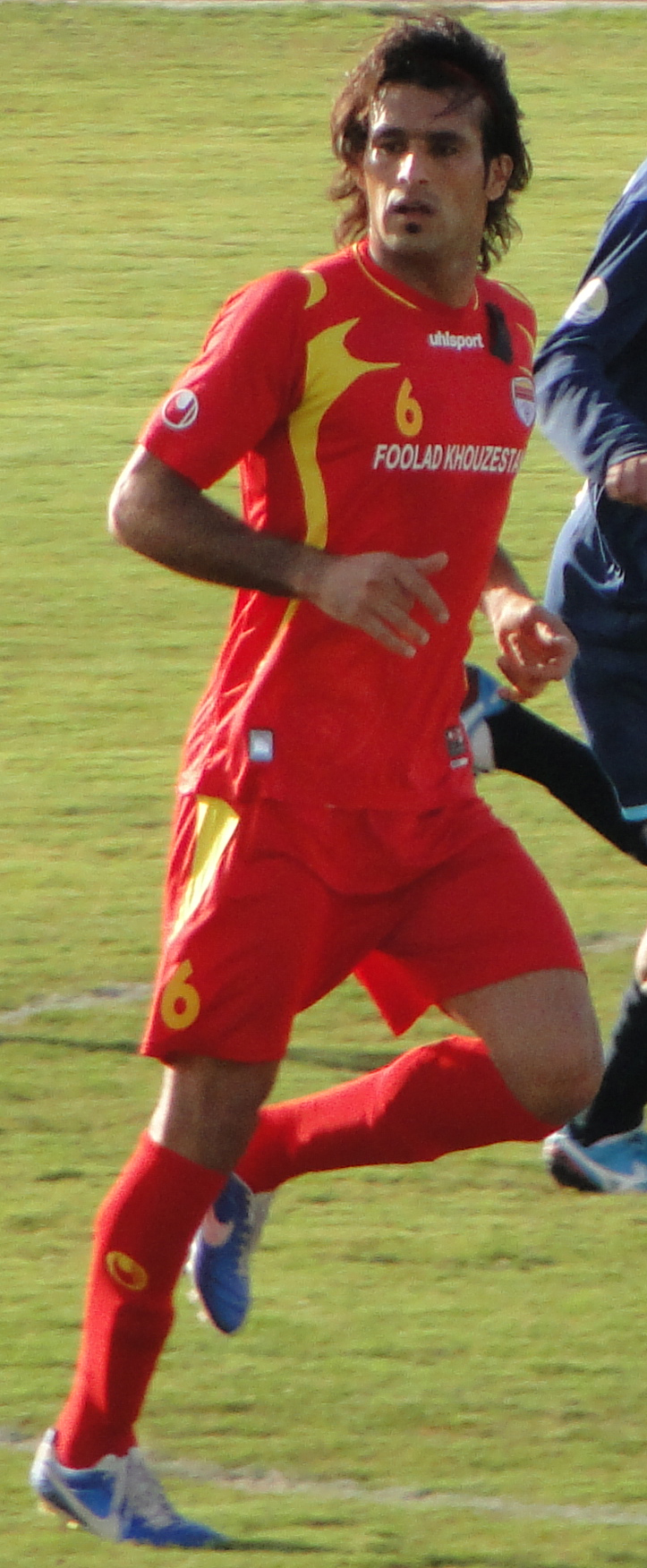
- Karami playing for Foolad in 2013

Personal information
- Full name: Abdollah Karami
- Date of birth: 27 February 1983 (age 43)
- Place of birth: Qaleh-ye Tuq, Dezful, Iran
- Height: 1.86 m (6 ft 1 in)
- Positions: Defensive midfielder; defender

Youth career
- 2005–2006: Foolad

Senior career*
Years	Team	Apps	(Gls)
2006–2007	Foolad	10	(1)
2007–2011	Shahin Bushehr	80	(8)
2011–2014	Foolad	76	(6)
2014–2016	Sepahan	53	(3)
2016–2019	Foolad	64	(0)
2019–2020	Esteghlal Khuzestan	9	(0)
- * Club domestic league appearances and goals as of 20 August 2015

Abdollah Karami (Persian: عبدالله کرمی; born February 27, 1983) is a former Iranian footballer who once played for Foolad in the Persian Gulf Pro League.

== Club career ==
Karami joined Shahin Bushehr in 2007 after spending the previous two seasons at Foolad. He signed a two-year with Sepahan in the summer of 2014 and was given number 10 jersey.

=== Club career statistics ===
As of 31 October 2014

Club performance			League		Cup		Continental		Total	
Season	Club	League	Apps	Goals	Apps	Goals	Apps	Goals	Apps	Goals
Iran			League		Hazfi Cup		Asia		Total	
2006–07	Foolad	Pro League	10	1	0	0	-	-	10	1
2007–08	Shahin	Division 1	?	5			-	-		
2008–09	Shahin	Division 1	?	1			-	-		
2009–10	Shahin	Pro League	26	2			-	-		
2010–11	Shahin	Pro League	27	2	1	0	-	-	28	0
2011–12	Foolad	Pro League	25	1	2	0	-	-	27	1
2012–13	Foolad	Pro League	24	4	0	0	-	-	24	4
2013–14	Foolad	Pro League	22	1	0	0	1	1	23	1
2014–15	Sepahan	Pro League	26	3	1	0	0	0	27	3
Career total				15			2	1		

== Honours ==
Foolad

- Iran Pro League (1): 2013–14

Sepahan

- Iran Pro League (1): 2014–15
