= Erfan Maftoolkar =

Iranian footballer

Personal information
- Date of birth: 8 January 1994 (age 32)
- Place of birth: Isfahan, Iran
- Position: Forward

Team information
- Current team: Foolad Yazd
- Number: 16

Youth career
- 2010–2014: Sepahan

Senior career*
Years	Team	Apps	(Gls)
2014–	Sepahan	1	(0)
2015	→ Giti Pasand (loan)	4	(0)
2016–	→ Foolad Yazd (loan)	2	(0)

International career
2010–2013	Iran U-20	18	(7)
- * Club domestic league appearances and goals as of 5 September 2014

Erfan Maftoolkar is an Iranian footballer who plays as a forward for Foolad Yazd in the Azadegan League.

== Club career statistics ==
- Last Update: 5 September 2014

Club performance			League		Cup		Continental		Total	
Season	Club	League	Apps	Goals	Apps	Goals	Apps	Goals	Apps	Goals
Iran			League		Hazfi Cup		Asia		Total	
2014–15	Sepahan	Iran Pro League	1	0	0	0	0	0	1	0
Career total			1	0	0	0	0	0	1	0

== Honours ==
=== Club ===
Sepahan

- Iran Pro League (1): 2014–15
