= Amirhossein Karimi =

Iranian footballer (born 1996)

Personal information
- Date of birth: 9 February 1996 (age 30)
- Place of birth: Isfahan, Iran
- Height: 1.77 m (5 ft 10 in)
- Position: Midfielder

Team information
- Current team: Nika Pars Chaloos
- Number: 33

Youth career
- 2010–2013: Sepahan

Senior career*
Years	Team	Apps	(Gls)
2013–2015	Sepahan	20	(0)
2015–2016	Gostaresh Foolad	29	(0)
2016–2020	Paykan	88	(0)
2020–2022	Shahr Khodro	35	(0)
2022	Aluminium Arak	2	(0)
2022–2023	Naft Masjed Soleyman	21	(1)
2023–2024	Saipa	13	(0)
2024–2025	Mes Kerman	11	(1)
2025–	Nika Pars Chaloos		

International career
2011–2013	Iran U17	14	(1)
2013–2014	Iran U20	7	(0)
2015–2016	Iran U23	5	(0)
- * Club domestic league appearances and goals as of 13 February 2025

Amirhossein Karimi (Persian: امیرحسین کریمی; born 9 February 1996) is an Iranian football center midfielder who plays for Nika Pars Chaloos in League 2.

== Career ==
Born in Isfahan, he is a creative midfielder with strong left and right foot. He has regularly represented Iran at U-17, U-20 and U-23 level respectively.

Amirhossein Karimi biggest achievement to date was partaking in the FIFA U-17 World Cup in 2013. Playing a pivotal role in qualification from the group matches and going on to score one of the goals of the tournament with a spectacular 30-yard strike in the 1–1 draw against Canada in the final group stages.

In 2013, Zlatko Kranjčar was impressed by the Amirhossein Karimi performance in U-17, U-20 national team and U-23 Sepahan team and recommended Sepahan to sign a 3 years contract with him. He made his debut for Sepahan on 5 December 2013 against Esteghlal. He also played 6 games in the AFC Champions League for Sepahan.

For 2015–16 Iran Pro League, Amirhossein Karimi joined Gostaresh Foulad club based on Faraz Kamalvand (Gostaresh Foolad head coach) request. He had a great year in this club and even Igor Štimac (Sepahan head coach at the time) regretted that they did not have Amirhossein Karimi with them in that season.

== Club career statistics ==
As of 19 August 2014

Club performance			League		Cup		Continental		Total	
Season	Club	League	Apps	Goals	Apps	Goals	Apps	Goals	Apps	Goals
Iran			League		Hazfi Cup		Asia		Total	
2013–14	Sepahan	Iran Pro League	5	0	3	0	0	0	8	0
2014–15	Sepahan	Iran Pro League	14	0	3	0	6	0	23	0
2015–16	Gostaresh Foolad	Iran Pro League	25	0	2	0	0	0	27	0

== Honours ==
=== Club ===
Sepahan

- Iran Pro League (1): 2014–15

=== Individual ===
- Persian Gulf Pro League Player of the Week: 2022–23 Week 1
