= Kara Shiraz F.C. =

Iranian football club

- Full name: Kara Shiraz Football Club
- Founded: 2009; 8 years ago
- Ground: Hafezieh Stadium
- Capacity: 14,000
- Owner: Kara Trading Group
- Chairman: Ali Bahadori
- Head Coach: Mohammad Abbasi
- League: Iran Football's 2nd Division
- Website: http://www.kara.co/fc/
Home colours

Kara Shiraz Football Club is an Iranian football club based in Shiraz, Fars who play in Iran Football's 2nd Division.

The club also runs U21, U19, a women's futsal team.

== History ==
Kara Shiraz Football Club was established in 2009 by businessmen Ali Bahadori and Samed Ghorbanizadeh. The club started playing in the Fars Provincial League soon after. In spring of 2015 Kara was promoted to the Iran Football's 2nd Division after finishing in first place in Group B of Iran Football's 3rd Division. Kara gained recognition inside Iran in 2015 after they defeated Persian Gulf Pro League side Esteghlal Ahvaz in the Hazfi Cup.

== Players ==
=== First-team squad ===
As of 20 September 2015 Note: Flags indicate national team as defined under FIFA eligibility rules; some limited exceptions apply. Players may hold more than one non-FIFA nationality.

| No. | Pos. | Nation | Player |
|---|---|---|---|
| — | | (Iran) IRN | Mohammad Javad Galikhani |
| — | | (Iran) IRN | Hassam Ghorbanizadeh |
| — | | (Iran) IRN | Siamak Keshavarz |
| — | | (Iran) IRN | Peyman Nasseri Tassoji |
| — | | (Iran) IRN | Morteza Sanjanki |
| — | | (Iran) IRN | Rasoul Safari |
| — | | (Iran) IRN | Mostafa Kargosha |
| — | | (Iran) IRN | Hamid Nahaei |
| — | | (Iran) IRN | Javad Zare |
| — | | (Iran) IRN | Mohsen Nikkhoda |
| — | | (Iran) IRN | Milad Falamarzi |
| — | | (Iran) IRN | Ali Rahimi |

| No. | Pos. | Nation | Player |
|---|---|---|---|
| — | | (Iran) IRN | Aghil Pouransari |
| — | | (Iran) IRN | Omidreza Karimi |
| — | | (Iran) IRN | Hassan Farji |
| — | | (Iran) IRN | Gholam Abbasfard |
| — | | (Iran) IRN | Davoud Ajdari |
| — | | (Iran) IRN | Iman Moghaddam |
| — | | (Iran) IRN | Behrouz Hooshmand |
| — | | (Iran) IRN | Amin Dehadashti |
| — | | (Iran) IRN | Ali Sarafan |
| — | | (Iran) IRN | Majid Najafi |
| — | | (Iran) IRN | Mohsen Niaysani |
