= Ali Hazami =

Iranian footballer

Personal information
- Date of birth: 25 February 1996 (age 30)
- Place of birth: Khoramshahr, Iran
- Position: Midfielder

Team information
- Current team: Be'sat Kermanshah
- Number: 30

Youth career
- 2013–2015: Foolad

Senior career*
Years	Team	Apps	(Gls)
2016	Sepahan	2	(0)
2016–2017	Baadraan		
2017–2018	Gol Reyhan	3	(0)
2018–2020	Karoon Arvand Khorramshahr	23	(0)
2020	Sorkhpoushan Pakdasht	6	(1)
2020–2021	Sanat Naft	0	(0)
2021–2022	Havadar	4	(0)
2022–2023	Nirooye Zamini	4	(0)
2024–2025	Shahid Ghandi Yazd	11	(0)
2025–	Be'sat Kermanshah	12	(0)

International career
2012–2014	Iran U17	4	(0)
- * Club domestic league appearances and goals as of 17 May 2016

Ali Hazami (born 25 February 1996) is an Iranian footballer who played as a left midfielder for Be'sat Kermanshah in the Azadegan League.

== Club career statistics ==
Last updated: 17 May 2016

Club performance			League		Cup		Continental		Total	
Season	Club	League	Apps	Goals	Apps	Goals	Apps	Goals	Apps	Goals
Iran			League		Hazfi Cup		Asia		Total	
2015–16	Sepahan	Iran Pro League	9	0	0	0	0	0	9	0
Career total			9	0	0	0	0	0	9	0

== International career ==
=== U17 ===
He represented Iran U17 in 2012 AFC U-16 Championship and 2013 FIFA U-17 World Cup.

=== U20 ===
He was invited to Iran U20 by Ali Dousti Mehr to prepare for the 2014 AFC U-19 Championship. Hazami played 3 matches for Iran during the 2014 AFC U-19 Championship.
