= Hossein Fazeli =

Iranian footballer

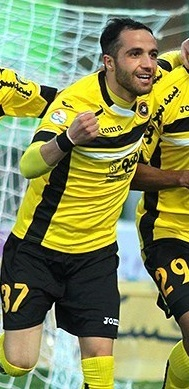

Personal information
- Date of birth: 12 June 1993 (age 33)
- Place of birth: Nishapur, Iran
- Height: 1.70 m (5 ft 7 in)
- Position: Winger

Team information
- Current team: Ario Eslamshahr
- Number: 17

Youth career
- Aria Neyshabour
- 2010–2012: Sepahan

Senior career*
Years	Team	Apps	(Gls)
2012–2014	Fajr Sepasi	3	(0)
2014–2017	Sepahan	26	(1)
2016–2017	→ Sepahan B	15	(4)
2018	Padideh	8	(1)
2018–2019	Sorkhpooshan Pakdasht	20	(2)
2019–2020	Damash Gilan	8	(0)
2020–2021	Khooshe Talaee	20	(5)
2021–2022	Kheybar	10	(4)
2022–2023	Khooshe Talaee	10	(0)
2023	Shams Azar	3	(1)
2023–2024	Shahr Raz	13	(0)
2024	Khooshe Talaee	10	(0)
2024–	Ario Eslamshahr	21	(5)

International career^{‡}
2011–2012	Iran U20	9	(3)
2015–2016	Iran U23	12	(2)
- * Club domestic league appearances and goals as of 11 April 2025 ‡ National team caps and goals as of 31 March 2015

Hossein Fazeli (Persian: حسین فاضلی; born 12 June 1993) is an Iranian footballer who plays as a winger for Ario Eslamshahr in the Azadegan League.

== Career ==
=== Fajr Sepasi ===
Fazeli made his debut for Fajr Sepasi in the Iran Pro League on 25 December 2012 against Zob Ahan Ishafan at the Foolad Shahr Stadium, coming on as a 74th minute is Jaber Ansari. He then made his first start for the side on 9 February 2013 against Damash playing until the 63rd minute.

=== Sepahan ===
Fazeli signed a five-year contract with Sepahan on 23 June 2014.

== Career statistics ==
=== Club ===
Statistics accurate as of 23 February 2013

Club	Season	League		Hazfi Cup		AFC		Total	
Club	Season	Apps	Goals	Apps	Goals	Apps	Goals	Apps	Goals
Fajr Sepasi	2012–13	2	0	0	0	—	—	2	0
Fajr Sepasi	2013–14	2	0	1	0	—	—	3	0
Sepahan	2014–15	11	1	0	0	2	0	13	1
Career total		15	1	1	0	2	0	18	1

== International career ==
=== U20 ===
He was part of Iran U–20 during 2012 AFC U-19 Championship qualification, 2012 CIS Cup, 2012 AFF U-19 Youth Championship and 2012 AFC U-19 Championship.

=== U23 ===
He invited to Iran U-23 training camp by Nelo Vingada to preparation for Incheon 2014 and 2016 AFC U-22 Championship (Summer Olympic qualification).

== Honours ==
=== Club ===
Sepahan

- Iran Pro League (1): 2014–15
