= Zahedan Stadium =

Football stadium in Zahedan, Iran

Zahedan Stadium ورزشگاه زاهدان
- Interactive map of Zahedan Stadium ورزشگاه زاهدان
- Location: Zahedan, Iran
- Coordinates: 29°27′41.04″N 60°50′17.04″E
- Owner: Iran Physical Education Institute
- Capacity: 15,000 (football)
- Surface: Grass

Construction
- Groundbreaking: 2005
- Opened: 18 April 2008
- Cost: IRR 70 billion

Zahedan Stadium (Persian: ورزشگاه زاهدان) is a football stadium in Zahedan, Iran. The stadium opened on 18 April 2008.
