= Rasoul Navidkia =

Iranian footballer (born 1983)

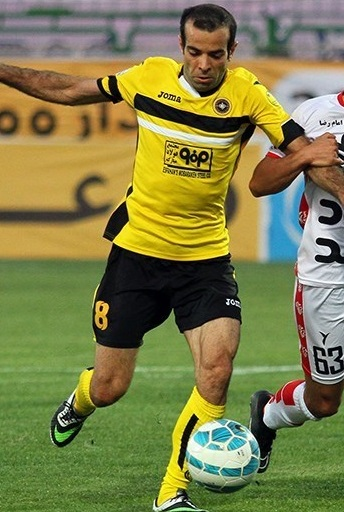

Personal information
- Full name: Rasoul Navidkia
- Date of birth: 21 December 1983 (age 42)
- Place of birth: Isfahan, Iran
- Height: 1.78 m (5 ft 10 in)
- Position: Central midfielder

Youth career
- Sepahan

Senior career*
Years	Team	Apps	(Gls)
2005–2006	Sepahan	13	(1)
2006–2007	Shahrdari Bandar Abbas	10	(4)
2007–2009	Mes Kerman	53	(1)
2009–2010	Sepahan Novin	20	(3)
2010–2013	Sanat Naft Abadan	69	(6)
2013–2014	Naft Tehran	27	(4)
2014–2021	Sepahan	110	(4)
- * Club domestic league appearances and goals as of 19 March 2021 ‡ National team caps and goals as of 26 March 2010

Rasoul Navidkia (Persian: رسول نویدکیا; born 21 December 1983) is an Iranian footballer who played for Sepahan in the Iran Pro League. He is younger brother of Moharram Navidkia, his former teammate at Sepahan.

== Club career ==
In 2010, Navidkia joined Sanat Naft after spending the previous season at Sepahan Novin in the Azadegan League. In 2013, he joined Naft Tehran.

Club performance			League		Cup		Continental		Total	
Season	Club	League	Apps	Goals	Apps	Goals	Apps	Goals	Apps	Goals
Iran			League		Hazfi Cup		Asia		Total	
2005–06	Sepahan	Pro League	13	1	0	0	-	-	13	1
2006–07	Sh.Bandar Abbas	Division 1					-	-		
2007–08	Mes	Pro League	31	0	1	0	-	-	32	0
2008–09	Mes	Pro League	22	1	0	0	-	-	22	1
2009–10	Sepahan Novin	Division 1	20	3	0	0	-	-	20	3
2010–11	Sanat Naft	Pro League	30	5	0	0	-	-	30	5
2011–12	Sanat Naft	Pro League	32	1	2	1	-	-	34	2
2012–13	Sanat Naft	Pro League	32	4	2	1	-	-	34	5
2013–14	Naft Tehran	Pro League	28	4	1	0	-	-	29	4
2014–15	Sepahan	Pro League	27	1	0	0	0	0	27	1
2015–16	Sepahan	Pro League	29	2	0	0	0	0	29	2
2016–17	Sepahan	Pro League	28	1	4	1	0	0	32	2
2017–18	Sepahan	Pro League	16	0	0	0	0	0	16	0
2018–19	Sepahan	Pro League	1	0	0	0	0	0	1	0
2019–20	Sepahan	Pro League	4	0	0	0	0	0	4	0
Career total			313	23	10	3	-	-	323	26

- Assists

Season	Team	Assists
2010–11	Sanat Naft	0
2011–12	Sanat Naft	7
2012–13	Sanat Naft	1
2013–14	Sanat Naft	3
2014–15	Sepahan	1
2015–16	Sepahan	1
2016–17	Sepahan	4
2017–18	Sepahan	0

== Honours ==
=== Club ===
Sepahan

- Iran Pro League (1): 2014–15
