= List of Iranian football transfers summer 2014 =

This is a list of Iranian football transfers for the 2014 summer transfer window. Transfers of Iran Pro League is listed.

== Rules and regulations ==
The Iranian Football Clubs who participate in 2014–15 Iran Pro League are allowed to have up to maximum 35 players (including up to maximum 4 non-Iranian players) in their player lists, which will be categorized in the following groups:

- Up to maximum 18 adult (without any age limit) players
- Up to maximum 9 under-23 players (i.e. the player whose birth is after 1 January 1992).
- Up to maximum 8 under-21 players (i.e. the player whose birth is after 1 January 1994).

According to Iran Football Federation rules for 2014–15 Football Season, each Football Club is allowed to take up to maximum 6 new Iranian player from the other clubs who already played in the 2013–14 Iran Pro League season. In addition to these six new players, each club is allowed to take up to maximum 4 non-Iranian new players (at least one of them should be Asian) and up to 3 players from Free agent (who did not play in 2013–14 Iran Pro League season or doesn't list in any 2014–15 League after season's start). In addition to these players, the clubs are also able to take some new under-23 and under-21 years old players, if they have some free place in these categories in their player lists. Under-23 players should sign in transfer window but under-21 & under-19 players can be signed during the first mid-season.

== Iran Pro League ==
=== Esteghlal ===
Head coach: Amir Ghalenoei
Remaining Pro League quota: 0

In: Note: Flags indicate national team as defined under FIFA eligibility rules; some limited exceptions apply. Players may hold more than one non-FIFA nationality.

No.	Pos.	Nation	Player
21	GK	IRN	Farzin Garousian (from Mes Soongoun)
—	MF	IRN	Hamidreza Nojavan (promoted from Esteghlal U21)
3	MF	IRN	Mohammad Reza Khorsandnia (from Padideh)
6	MF	IRN	Omid Ebrahimi (from Sepahan)
34	DF	IRN	Milad Fakhreddini (from Tractor Sazi)
10	FW	IRN	Sajjad Shahbazzadeh (from Saipa)
15	DF	ARM	Hrayr Mkoyan (from (Armenia) FC Shirak)
28	MF	IRN	Mohsen Karimi (promoted from Esteghlal U21)
27	DF	IRN	Mohammad Reza Soleimani (from PAS Hamedan)
23	MF	IRN	Mehdi Karimian (from Tractor Sazi)
18	DF	IRN	Soheil Asgharzadeh (from Malavan)
1	GK	IRN	Mohsen Forouzan (from Gostaresh Foulad)
13	MF	IRQ	Karrar Jassim (from (Iraq) Al-Talaba)
12	GK	BRA	Alberto Rafael da Silva (from (Brazil) Fluminense)
17	MF	IRN	Yaghoub Karimi (on loan from Sepahan)
19	MF	IRN	Alireza Ramezani (from Naft Gachsaran)
24	MF	IRN	Omid Noorafkan (promoted from Esteghlal U19)
25	DF	IRN	Mohammad Khalili (promoted from Esteghlal U21)
26	FW	IRN	Iman Abaszadeh (from Nassaji)
30	MF	IRN	Saeid Amraei (promoted from Esteghlal U21)
32	MF	IRN	Amir Hossein Tahouni (from Kimia Farayand Darbandsar)
35	DF	IRN	Mehdi Karbalaei (from Naft Tehran U21)
40	GK	IRN	Abbas Bakhtiari (from Moghavemat Tehran U21)

Out: Note: Flags indicate national team as defined under FIFA eligibility rules; some limited exceptions apply. Players may hold more than one non-FIFA nationality.

No.	Pos.	Nation	Player
1	GK	IRN	Mehdi Rahmati (to Paykan)
70	DF	IRN	Majid Gholamnejad (Released)
34	MF	IRN	Iman Basafa (Loan to Esteghlal Khuzestan)
3	MF	TRI	Jlloyd Samuel (to Paykan)
23	MF	IRN	Iman Mobali (to Naft Tehran)
22	MF	IRN	Alireza Vahedi Nikbakht (Released)
27	MF	BRA	Tony (Loan return to (Brazil) Boavista)
32	MF	IRN	Mehdi Nazari (to Gostaresh Foolad)
77	FW	IRN	Mehrdad Oladi (to Malavan)
10	FW	IRN	Siavash Akbarpour (Released)
19	FW	FRA	Boubacar Kébé (Released)
21	GK	IRN	Hossein Hosseini (to Malavan)
13	GK	IRN	Mehrdad Hosseini (Released)
12	DF	IRN	Meisam Joudaki (to Naft Tehran)
30	MF	IRN	Arash Rezavand (to Naft Tehran, previously on loan)
20	MF	IRN	Ahmad Jamshidian (Released)

=== Esteghlal Khuzestan ===
Head coach: Abdollah Veisi
Remaining Pro League quota: 0

In: Note: Flags indicate national team as defined under FIFA eligibility rules; some limited exceptions apply. Players may hold more than one non-FIFA nationality.

No.	Pos.	Nation	Player
3	DF	IRN	Majid Heidari (from Saba Qom)
14	MF	IRN	Iman Basafa (on loan from Esteghlal)
17	FW	IRN	Rouhollah Seifollahi (from Damash)
11	MF	IRN	Mohammad Reza Mahdavi (from Damash)
8	MF	IRN	Reza Kardoust (from Damash)
10	FW	IRN	Mehdi Momeni (from Saba Qom)
20	MF	IRN	Meysam Majidi (from Aluminium)
6	MF	IRN	Meysam Doraghi (from Naft Masjed Soleyman)
15	FW	IRN	Sadegh Sadeghi Baba-Ahmadi (from Naft Masjed Soleyman)
12	DF	IRN	Milad Rabbani (from Niroye Zamini)
19	MF	IRN	Yazdan Abbasian (from Gahar)
16	GK	MLI	Soumbeïla Diakité (from (Mali) Stade Malien)
9	FW	MLI	Lamine Diawara (from (Mali) Stade Malien)
27	MF	IRN	Hamdollah Ebdam (promoted from Esteghlal Khuzestan U21)
28	DF	IRN	Bagher Hashemi (promoted from Esteghlal Khuzestan U21)
22	GK	IRN	Vahid Mashilashi (promoted from Esteghlal Khuzestan U21)
26	MF	IRN	Ali Daghagheleh (promoted from Esteghlal Khuzestan U21)
29	FW	IRN	Ali Ebrahimpour (promoted from Esteghlal Khuzestan U21)
31	DF	IRN	Elyas Vashahi (promoted from Esteghlal Khuzestan U21)
32	MF	IRN	Mohammad Ali Safia (promoted from Esteghlal Khuzestan U21)

Out: Note: Flags indicate national team as defined under FIFA eligibility rules; some limited exceptions apply. Players may hold more than one non-FIFA nationality.

No.	Pos.	Nation	Player
1	GK	BRA	Fábio Carvalho (Released)
4	DF	IRN	Sohrab Bakhtiarizadeh (Retired)
7	FW	IRN	Mehdi Chahkoutahzadeh (to Fajr Sepasi)
8	MF	MLI	Idrissa Traoré (to (Mali) Djoliba)
9	MF	IRN	Mahmoud Tighnavard (to Naft Masjed Soleyman)
10	FW	IRN	Milad Meydavoudi (to Saipa)
11	FW	IRN	Mohammad Moaavi (to Esteghlal Ahvaz)
13	DF	IRN	Hossein Kaabi (Released)
14	MF	IRN	Mehdi Kheiri (to Padideh)
15	MF	IRN	Karim Shaverdi (to Esteghlal Ahvaz)
19	FW	IRN	Ali Bigdeli (to Iranjavan)
21	MF	IRN	Shahrokh Shams (Released)
24	DF	IRN	Ala Khalafzadeh (Released)
26	DF	IRN	Mohammad Mad Malisi (to Naft Masjed Soleyman)
27	FW	IRN	Ehsan Alvanzadeh (to Naft Masjed Soleyman)
35	FW	IRN	Sajjad Ghasemnejad (Released)
40	MF	IRN	Adel Kolahkaj (Released)
66	DF	IRN	Saeid Chahjouei (to Esteghlal Ahvaz)

=== Foolad ===
Head coach: (Croatia) Dragan Skočić
Remaining Pro League quota: 4

In: Note: Flags indicate national team as defined under FIFA eligibility rules; some limited exceptions apply. Players may hold more than one non-FIFA nationality.

No.	Pos.	Nation	Player
9	FW	IRN	Iman Mousavi (from Gostaresh Foulad)
15	MF	CMR	Mathias Chago (from (Croatia) Lokomotiva Zagreb)
19	DF	IRN	Bahman Kamel (from Naft Tehran)
22	GK	IRN	Behnam Mousavi (promoted from Foolad U21)
26	FW	IRN	Bahman Jahantigh (promoted from Foolad U19)
25	DF	IRN	Mohammad Ahle Shakhe (promoted from Foolad U21)
27	DF	IRN	Reza Ahmadi (promoted from Foolad U21)
29	MF	IRN	Ali Sina Rabbani (promoted from Foolad U21)
32	MF	IRN	Hadi Habibinejad (promoted from Foolad U19)
3	DF	CRO	Leonard Mesarić (from (Croatia) Lokomotiva Zagreb)

Out: Note: Flags indicate national team as defined under FIFA eligibility rules; some limited exceptions apply. Players may hold more than one non-FIFA nationality.

No.	Pos.	Nation	Player
9	FW	IRN	Abbas Mohammad Rezaei (to Padideh)
10	MF	IRN	Abdollah Karami (to Sepahan)
77	GK	IRN	Sosha Makani (to Persepolis)
37	FW	IRN	Gholamreza Rezaei (to Naft Tehran)
17	DF	IRN	Abolhassan Jafari (to Malavan)
55	DF	IRN	Saeid Salarzadeh (to Naft Masjed Soleyman)
6	MF	IRN	Mehdi Nouri (Released)
2	DF	BRA	Leandro Padovani (to Naft Tehran)
15	MF	BRA	Leandro Chaves (to (Brazil) America RJ)
29	FW	BRA	Luciano Pereira (to Sepahan)
33	DF	IRN	Vafa Hakhamaneshi (to Fajr Sepasi)
20	MF	IRN	Ayoub Kalantari (to Saba Qom)

=== Gostaresh Foulad ===
Head coach: Mehdi Tartar
Remaining Pro League quota: 2

In: Note: Flags indicate national team as defined under FIFA eligibility rules; some limited exceptions apply. Players may hold more than one non-FIFA nationality.

No.	Pos.	Nation	Player
11	MF	IRN	Mehdi Nazari (from Esteghlal)
20	DF	IRN	Mohammad Mokhtari (from Damash)
15	FW	IRN	Peyman Ranjbar (from Naft Gachsaran)
12	MF	IRN	Adel Sarshar (from Abouumoslem)
13	DF	IRN	Hamid Jokar (from Fajr Sepasi)
8	DF	IRN	Morteza Asadi (from Tractor Sazi)
19	MF	IRN	Mohammad Amin Darvishi (from Badr Hormozgan)
14	MF	BRA	Magno Batista (from (Brazil) Novo Hamburgo)
22	GK	IRN	Mohammad Nasseri (from Sepahan, previously on loan)
17	MF	IRN	Milad Jahani (from Mes Kerman)
29	MF	IRN	Hamed Nourollahi (from Free agent)
33	GK	URU	Rodrigo Odriozola (from (Uruguay) Cerro)

Out: Note: Flags indicate national team as defined under FIFA eligibility rules; some limited exceptions apply. Players may hold more than one non-FIFA nationality.

No.	Pos.	Nation	Player
1	GK	IRN	Mohsen Forouzan (to Esteghlal)
7	MF	IRN	Saman Nariman Jahan (on loan at Tractor Sazi)
8	MF	IRN	Rasoul Alizadeh (to Machine Sazi)
24	DF	IRN	Mohsen Hosseini (to Nassaji)
4	DF	IRN	Khaled Shafiei (to Tractor Sazi)
10	FW	IRN	Iman Mousavi (to Foolad)
2	DF	IRN	Mehdi Mohammadpouri (to Shahrdari Ardabil)
5	DF	IRN	Saeid Mehdipour (to Shahrdari Tabriz)
12	MF	IRN	Ahmad Amirkamdar (to Tractor Sazi)
13	MF	IRN	Amir Tizro (to Damash)
14	FW	IRN	Behzad Zabihi (Released)
21	MF	IRN	Kianoush Mirzaei (to Damash)
26	DF	IRN	Fardin Abedini (to Mes Kerman)
33	GK	IRN	Mohsen Vizvari (to Foolad Yazd)
77	DF	IRN	Mostafa Ekrami (to Mes Kerman)

=== Malavan ===
Head coach: Nosrat Irandoost
Remaining Pro League quota: 4

In: Note: Flags indicate national team as defined under FIFA eligibility rules; some limited exceptions apply. Players may hold more than one non-FIFA nationality.

No.	Pos.	Nation	Player
27	FW	IRN	Arman Ramezani (loan return from Fajr Sepasi)
22	GK	IRN	Hossein Hosseini (from Esteghlal)
5	DF	IRN	Ezzatollah Pourghaz (from Iranjavan)
15	DF	IRN	Hossein Kanaani (from Persepolis)
3	DF	IRN	Abolhassan Jafari (from Foolad)
11	MF	IRN	Mohammad Gholamin (from Free agent)
23	DF	IRN	Shayan Kargar (promoted from Malavan U21)
19	MF	IRN	Mohammad Razipour (promoted from Malavan U21)
20	FW	IRN	Ali Abedi (promoted from Malavan U21)
17	MF	IRN	Milad Jalali (promoted from Malavan U21)
21	MF	IRN	Mohammad Darabi (from Shahrdari Yasuj)
26	MF	IRN	Mahyar Zahmatkesh (promoted from Malavan U21)
24	FW	IRN	Mohammad Hadi Yaghoubi (loan return from Gahar)
35	MF	IRN	Reza Etemadi (from Chooka)
77	FW	IRN	Mehrdad Oladi (from Esteghlal)
44	GK	IRN	Nima Mirzazad (promoted from Malavan U19)
33	GK	IRN	Mohammadreza Ghavidel (promoted from Malavan U21)
18	MF	IRN	Hamid Golzari (from Alvand Hamedan)

Out: Note: Flags indicate national team as defined under FIFA eligibility rules; some limited exceptions apply. Players may hold more than one non-FIFA nationality.

No.	Pos.	Nation	Player
5	DF	IRN	Siamak Kouroshi (loan return to Naft Tehran)
2	MF	IRN	Mehdi Daghagheleh (to Persepolis)
11	FW	IRN	Shahin Saghebi (on loan at Tractor Sazi)
4	MF	IRN	Soheil Asgharzadeh (to Esteghlal, Previously on loan at Gahar)
30	MF	IRN	Mehdi Shiri (to Naft Tehran)
23	MF	IRN	Amir Hossein Feshangchi (to Paykan)
88	MF	IRN	Milad Zeneyedpour (to Naft Masjed Soleyman)
3	DF	IRN	Ahmad Mehdizadeh (to Saba Qom)
26	MF	IRN	Mohammad Pour Rahmatollah (on loan at Tractor Sazi)
28	MF	IRN	Mohammad Jafari (to Sepidrood, Previously on loan at Gahar)
33	GK	IRN	Mehdi Rahimzadeh (to Damash)
77	MF	IRN	Hadi Daghagheleh (to Shahrdari Bandar Abbas)
18	FW	IRN	Esmaeil Samadi (to Khoneh Be Khoneh Mazandaran)

=== Naft Masjed Soleyman ===
Head coach: Majid Bagherinia
Remaining Pro League quota: 1

In: Note: Flags indicate national team as defined under FIFA eligibility rules; some limited exceptions apply. Players may hold more than one non-FIFA nationality.

No.	Pos.	Nation	Player
20	MF	IRN	Milad Zeneyedpour (from Malavan)
1	GK	IRN	Reza Mohammadi (from Persepolis)
7	MF	IRN	Mahmoud Tighnavard (from Esteghlal Khzuestan)
25	FW	IRN	Milad Soleiman Fallah (from Saba Qom)
2	DF	IRN	Jalal Abdi (from Foolad Yazd)
6	MF	IRN	Ehsan Abdi (from Aluminium)
4	DF	IRN	Hamed Mahmoudi (from Shahrdari Yasuj)
3	DF	IRN	Saeid Salarzadeh (from Foolad)
8	MF	IRN	Hamid Bou Hamdan (on loan from Naft Tehran)
15	DF	IRN	Mohammad Mad Malisi (from Esteghlal Khzuestan)
27	FW	IRN	Ehsan Alvanzadeh (from Esteghlal Khzuestan)
11	MF	IRN	Milad Jafari (from Naft Gachsaran)
70	GK	IRN	Reza Heidari (from Foolad Yazd)
32	MF	IRN	Sattar Darraji (from Naft Ahvaz U21)
30	DF	IRN	Sajjad Mousavi (from Shahin Ahvaz U21)
24	MF	IRN	Aref Soleyman Ahmad (promoted from Naft Masjed Soleyman U21)
14	FW	IRN	Reza Karmolachaab (from Foolad U19)

Out: Note: Flags indicate national team as defined under FIFA eligibility rules; some limited exceptions apply. Players may hold more than one non-FIFA nationality.

No.	Pos.	Nation	Player
24	MF	IRN	Meysam Doraghi (to Esteghlal Khzuestan)
20	FW	IRN	Sadegh Sadeghi (to Esteghlal Khzuestan)
8	FW	IRN	Hakim Nassari (to Saipa)
1	GK	IRN	Yousef Behzadi (to Esteghlal Ahvaz)
2	DF	IRN	Sasan Shirmardi (to Esteghlal Ahvaz)
3	DF	IRN	Ali Jahangiri (to Shahrdari Bandar Abbas)
4	DF	IRN	Kheyrollah Veisi (to Esteghlal Ahvaz)
5	DF	IRN	Mohammad Kouti (to Iranjavan)
6	MF	IRN	Milad Sadeghi (Released)
7	MF	IRN	Homayoun Geravand (to Esteghlal Ahvaz)
11	FW	IRN	Sajjad Feizollahi (Released)
14	MF	IRN	Mostafa Norouzi (to Esteghlal Ahvaz)
15	MF	IRN	Omid Sing (to Esteghlal Ahvaz)
18	MF	IRN	Milad Davoudi (to Yazd Louleh)
22	GK	IRN	Abolfazl Bahadorani (to Foolad Novin)
25	MF	IRN	Abbas Dehghan (Released)
30	MF	IRN	Masoud Ghanavati (to Esteghlal Ahvaz)
32	FW	IRN	Amin Salehvandi (to Shahrdari Zanjan)
—	MF	IRN	Sirous Kariminejad (Released)

=== Naft Tehran ===
Head coach: Alireza Mansourian
Remaining Pro League quota: 0

In: Note: Flags indicate national team as defined under FIFA eligibility rules; some limited exceptions apply. Players may hold more than one non-FIFA nationality.

No.	Pos.	Nation	Player
4	DF	IRN	Siamak Kouroshi (loan return from Malavan)
10	FW	IRN	Gholamreza Rezaei (from Foolad)
8	MF	CMR	David Wirikom (from Rah Ahan)
23	MF	IRN	Iman Mobali (from Esteghlal)
12	DF	IRN	Meysam Joudaki (from Esteghlal U21)
77	FW	IRN	Amir Arsalan Motahari (from Moghavemat Tehran U21)
22	DF	IRN	Reza Aliari (from Moghavemat Tehran U21)
28	MF	IRN	Arash Rezavand (from Esteghlal U21, previously on loan)
2	MF	IRN	Mehdi Shiri (from Malavan)
14	DF	IRN	Saeid Lotfi (from Saba Qom)
32	DF	IRN	Saeed Ghezelagchi (from Fajr Sepasi)
30	GK	IRN	Ahmad Gohari (promoted from Naft Tehran U21)
20	DF	BRA	Leandro Padovani (from Foolad)

Out: Note: Flags indicate national team as defined under FIFA eligibility rules; some limited exceptions apply. Players may hold more than one non-FIFA nationality.

No.	Pos.	Nation	Player
21	DF	IRN	Vouria Ghafouri (to Sepahan)
8	MF	IRN	Rasoul Navidkia (to Sepahan)
32	FW	IRN	Hadi Norouzi (Loan return to Persepolis)
10	FW	IRN	Reza Norouzi (to Persepolis)
3	DF	IRN	Bahman Kamel (to Foolad)
12	DF	IRN	Hossein Emamian (to Nassaji)
2	DF	IRN	Ahmad Alenemeh (to Tractor Sazi)
34	DF	IRN	Ahmad Firouz Samadi (Released)
36	FW	IRN	Shayan Taghavi (Released)
4	DF	IRN	Ali Nourian (to Nassaji)
27	MF	IRN	Milad Nouri (to Saba Qom)
14	MF	IRN	Hamid Bou Hamdan (on loan at Naft Masjed Soleyman)
70	FW	IRN	Mojtaba Shiri (to Rah Ahan)

=== Padideh ===
Head coach: Alireza Marzban
Remaining Pro League quota: 0

In: Note: Flags indicate national team as defined under FIFA eligibility rules; some limited exceptions apply. Players may hold more than one non-FIFA nationality.

No.	Pos.	Nation	Player
88	MF	IRN	Mohammadreza Bazaj (from Padideh U19)
32	DF	IRN	Mohammad Valizadeh (from Padideh U21)
2	DF	IRN	Mohammad Nejad Mehdi (from Nassaji)
10	FW	IRN	Reza Enayati (from Saba Qom)
7	FW	IRN	Keivan Amraei (from Saba Qom)
5	FW	IRN	Akbar Sadeghi (from Saba Qom)
4	DF	MNE	Milan Jovanović (from (Bulgaria) Lokomotiv Sofia)
66	FW	IRN	Ali Choupani (on loan from Sepahan)
30	DF	IRN	Ahmad Eskandari (from Sepahan)
12	MF	IRN	Milad Gharibi (on loan from Persepolis)
11	MF	IRN	Younes Shakeri (from Persepolis)
77	FW	IRN	Abbas Mohammad Rezaei (from Foolad)
9	MF	IRN	Reza Nasehi (from Saipa)
14	MF	IRN	Mehdi Kheiri (from Esteghlal Khuzestan)
44	MF	IRN	Hossein Kiani (from Siah Jamegan)
17	FW	IRN	Rouhollah Bagheri (from Siah Jamegan)
19	DF	CRO	Igor Prahić (from (Romania) Vaslui)
27	MF	SRB	Zoran Knežević (from (Serbia) Sloboda Užice)
25	MF	IRN	Abdollah Mombeini (from Shahrdari Bandar Abbas)
15	FW	IRN	Abolfazl Qoreyshi (from Giti Pasand U19)
35	GK	IRN	Saeid Jalali (from Aboumoslem)
24	MF	IRN	Reza Otaghi (from Aboumoslem)
60	MF	IRN	Mohammadreza Kaveh (from Pishgaman Mashhad U19)
75	FW	IRN	Hossein Mehraban (from Danesh Feridoun Kenar U19)

Out: Note: Flags indicate national team as defined under FIFA eligibility rules; some limited exceptions apply. Players may hold more than one non-FIFA nationality.

No.	Pos.	Nation	Player
6	MF	IRN	Mohammad Reza Khorsandnia (to Esteghlal)
20	DF	IRN	Mirhani Hashemi (to Tractor Sazi)
99	MF	IRN	Mehrdad Ghanbari (to Zob Ahan)
8	MF	IRN	Mohammad Hassan Rajabzadeh (Released)
2	DF	IRN	Omid Khalili (to Mes Kerman)
4	DF	IRN	Karim Ebrahimi Rad (Released)
5	DF	IRN	Behtash Misaghian (to Mes Kerman)
7	MF	IRN	Mohammad Mansouri (Released)
11	FW	IRN	Bahman Tahmasebi (to Mes Kerman)
16	MF	IRN	Fariborz Gerami (to Nassaji)
17	MF	IRN	Masoud Rouzbahani (to Mes Kerman)
19	DF	IRN	Mehrdad Solhi (Released)
24	MF	IRN	Peyman Miri (to Nirouye Zamini)
9	FW	IRN	Afshin Daneshian (to Naft Gachsaran)
12	GK	IRN	Omid Gholami (to Iranjavan)
77	MF	IRN	Amjad Shokouh Magham (to Mes Kerman)
10	MF	IRN	Majid Noormohammadi (to Khoneh Be Khoneh Mazandaran)
36	MF	IRN	Mehdi Zamanzadeh (Released)
37	FW	IRN	Abbas Pourkhosravani (to Mes Kerman)

=== Paykan ===
Head coach: Mansour Ebrahimzadeh
Remaining Pro League quota: 0

In: Note: Flags indicate national team as defined under FIFA eligibility rules; some limited exceptions apply. Players may hold more than one non-FIFA nationality.

No.	Pos.	Nation	Player
23	MF	IRN	Amir Hossein Feshangchi (from Malavan)
1	GK	IRN	Mehdi Rahmati (from Esteghlal)
10	FW	IRN	Saeid Daghighi (from Tractor Sazi)
3	MF	TRI	Jlloyd Samuel (from Esteghlal)
20	DF	IRN	Mohammad Nosrati (from Tractor Sazi)
9	MF	IRN	Milad Nouri (from Rah Ahan)
16	DF	IRN	Arman Ghasemi (from Rah Ahan)
24	DF	IRN	Ali Hosseini (from Rah Ahan)
18	FW	IRN	Faraz Emamali (promoted from Paykan U21)
29	MF	IRN	Siamak Nemati (from Moghavemat Tehran)
27	DF	IRN	Amir Hossein Amiri (promoted from Paykan U21)
5	DF	IRN	Siavash Yazdani (from Siah Jamegan Khorasan)
32	FW	CRO	Mate Eterović (from (Slovenia) Rudar Velenje)
31	FW	IRN	Mobin Ezzati (from Payam Sanat Amol)
88	MF	BIH	Muamer Svraka (from (Bosnia and Herzegovina) Željezničar)
25	FW	IRN	Arman Ghorbannejad (promoted from Paykan U21)

Out: Note: Flags indicate national team as defined under FIFA eligibility rules; some limited exceptions apply. Players may hold more than one non-FIFA nationality.

No.	Pos.	Nation	Player
1	GK	IRN	Alireza Ghadiri (Released)
2	FW	IRN	Milad Kermani (to Saipa)
3	DF	IRN	Mehdi Amirabadi (Released)
4	MF	IRN	Hossein Babaei (Released)
5	DF	IRN	Alireza Jarahkar (to Mes Rafsanjan)
6	DF	IRN	Kazem Borjlou (Released)
10	FW	IRN	Behshad Yavarzadeh (Released)
11	FW	IRN	Iman Razaghirad (Released)
14	MF	IRN	Ali Amiri (to Shahrdari Tabriz)
18	FW	IRN	Amin Torkashvand (to Damash)
33	DF	IRN	Mohammad Borjlou (to Saba Qom)
70	FW	IRN	Mojtaba Zarei (Released)
15	MF	IRN	Milad Abtahi (to Rah Ahan)
22	GK	IRN	Abbas Ghasemi (Released)
23	MF	IRN	Sirous Sadeghian (to Shahrdari Fouman)
13	DF	IRN	Mehrdad Yeghaneh (to Nirouye Zamini)
25	DF	IRN	Mohammad Ashtiani (to Aluminium Arak)
28	FW	IRN	Mobin Mir Doraghi (to Saipa)
32	MF	IRN	Majid Torkashvand (Released)

=== Persepolis ===
Head coach: Ali Daei
Remaining Pro League quota: 3

In: Note: Flags indicate national team as defined under FIFA eligibility rules; some limited exceptions apply. Players may hold more than one non-FIFA nationality.

No.	Pos.	Nation	Player
3	DF	IRN	Mohammadreza Khanzadeh (loan return from Zob Ahan)
15	MF	IRN	Afshin Esmaeilzadeh (loan return from (Portugal) Beira-Mar)
24	FW	IRN	Hadi Norouzi (loan return from Naft Tehran)
8	FW	IRN	Mehdi Daghagheleh (from Malavan)
17	FW	IRN	Mehdi Taremi (from Iranjavan)
1	GK	IRN	Sosha Makani (from Foolad)
10	FW	IRN	Reza Norouzi (from Naft Tehran)
28	MF	IRN	Ahmad Nourollahi (from Foolad Yazd)
23	GK	IRN	Nader Safarzaei (from Rah Ahan)
29	DF	IRN	Navid Sabouri (from Rah Ahan U19)
21	MF	IRN	Ali Astani (from Shahrdari Ardabil)
27	FW	IRN	Ali Fatemi (from Rah Ahan U21)
4	DF	CRC	Michael Umaña (from (Costa Rica) Saprissa)

Out: Note: Flags indicate national team as defined under FIFA eligibility rules; some limited exceptions apply. Players may hold more than one non-FIFA nationality.

No.	Pos.	Nation	Player
77	MF	IRN	Mohsen Mosalman (loan return to Zob Ahan)
22	MF	IRN	Milad Gharibi (Loan to Padideh, previously on loan)
17	FW	IRN	Younes Shakeri (to Padideh, previously on loan)
5	MF	IRN	Ghasem Dehnavi (to Zob Ahan)
21	GK	IRN	Amir Abedzadeh (to Rah Ahan)
1	GK	IRN	Reza Mohammadi (to Naft Masjed Soleyman)
23	FW	IRN	Mehdi Seyed-Salehi (to Saipa)
15	DF	IRN	Hossein Kanaani (to Malavan)
64	FW	IRN	Farzad Hatami (to Mes Kerman)
99	FW	IRN	Mohammadreza Khalatbari (to Sepahan)
4	DF	IRN	Jalal Hosseini (to (Qatar) Al Ahli)
16	DF	IRN	Mehrdad Pooladi (to (Qatar) Al-Shahania)

=== Rah Ahan ===
Head coach: Hamid Estili
Remaining Pro League quota: 0

In: Note: Flags indicate national team as defined under FIFA eligibility rules; some limited exceptions apply. Players may hold more than one non-FIFA nationality.

No.	Pos.	Nation	Player
8	FW	IRN	Mohammad Gholami (from Sepahan)
3	DF	IRN	Mohsen Irannejad (from Sepahan)
22	GK	IRN	Amir Abedzadeh (from Persepolis)
20	MF	IRN	Mohammad Abshak (from Mes Kerman)
24	MF	IRN	Milad Mohammadi (from Nirouye Zamini U21)
23	MF	IRN	Mehrdad Mohammadi (from Oghab U21)
4	DF	IRN	Sheys Rezaei (from Mes Kerman)
2	DF	IRN	Ahmad Mousavi (from Pas Hamedan)
29	MF	IRN	Milad Abtahi (from Paykan)
33	DF	IRN	Mohammad Sattari (promoted from Rah Ahan U21)
30	MF	IRN	Siamak Koohnavard (from Fajr Sepasi)
40	GK	SVN	Igor Nenezić (from (Slovenia) FC Koper)
19	FW	IRN	Mojtaba Shiri (from Naft Tehran)
26	MF	IRN	Farshad Faraji (promoted from Rah Ahan U21)
28	MF	IRN	Khalil Helali (promoted from Rah Ahan U21)

Out: Note: Flags indicate national team as defined under FIFA eligibility rules; some limited exceptions apply. Players may hold more than one non-FIFA nationality.

No.	Pos.	Nation	Player
20	DF	IRN	Pirouz Ghorbani (to Saba Qom)
99	MF	IRN	Milad Nouri (to Paykan)
25	MF	CMR	David Wirikom (to Naft Tehran)
1	GK	IRN	Hamed Fallahzadeh (from Saipa)
77	DF	IRN	Arman Ghasemi (to Paykan)
24	DF	IRN	Ali Hosseini (to Paykan)
22	GK	IRN	Nader Safarzaei (to Persepolis)
—	DF	IRN	Navid Sabouri (to Persepolis)
—	FW	IRN	Ali Fatemi (to Persepolis)
14	MF	IRN	Saman Aghazamani (Released)
7	MF	IRN	Farzad Ashoubi (to Shahrdari Tabriz)
3	DF	IRN	Hassan Javadi (to Mes Kerman)
4	DF	IRN	Ali Gholam (Released)
8	MF	IRN	Hossein Pashaei (Retired)
15	DF	IRN	Iman Shirazi (to Giti Pasand)
40	DF	IRN	Belash Hosseini (Released)
2	GK	IRN	Mohammadreza Ghodratipour (to Saba Qom)

=== Saba Qom ===
Head coach: Samad Marfavi
Remaining Pro League quota: 0

In: Note: Flags indicate national team as defined under FIFA eligibility rules; some limited exceptions apply. Players may hold more than one non-FIFA nationality.

No.	Pos.	Nation	Player
20	DF	IRN	Pirouz Ghorbani (from Rah Ahan Sorinet)
32	MF	IRN	Hamid Reza Kazemi (from Sepahan)
26	MF	IRN	Omid Ghorbani (from Badr Hormozgan)
99	FW	IRN	Abbas Ghadian (from Khoneh Be Khoneh Mazandaran)
14	MF	IRN	Ghasem Gerami (from Khoneh Be Khoneh Mazandaran)
12	GK	IRN	Milad Farahani (from Damash)
17	FW	IRN	Jalaleddin Alimohammadi (from Fajr Sepasi)
3	DF	IRN	Ahmad Mehdizadeh (from Malavan)
70	MF	IRN	Ahmad Hassanzadeh (from Mes Kerman)
40	GK	IRN	Mohammadreza Ghodratipour (from Rah Ahan)
29	FW	IRN	Sajjad Kerman (from Nassaji)
9	MF	CMR	Ambuno Achille (from Rahian Kermanshah)
66	DF	IRN	Mohammad Borjlou (from Paykan)
11	MF	IRN	Ayoub Kalantari (from Foolad)
24	MF	IRN	Milad Nouri (from Naft Tehran)
31	MF	IRN	Farshid Bagheri (from Etka)
77	MF	IRN	Bahram Ahmadi (from Gol Gohar)
28	FW	IRN	Aram Abbasi (from Fajr Sepasi U21)
15	MF	IRN	Ehsan Sokhandan (from Fajr Sepasi U21)
16	FW	BRA	Marco Aurélio Iubel (from (Brazil) Mirassol)
34	DF	IRN	Masoud Abarghouei (from Abadgaran Qom)
33	FW	IRN	Mohammad Milad Abadi (promoted from Saba Qom U21)
21	MF	IRN	Mohsen Karami (promoted from Saba Qom U21)

Out: Note: Flags indicate national team as defined under FIFA eligibility rules; some limited exceptions apply. Players may hold more than one non-FIFA nationality.

No.	Pos.	Nation	Player
7	MF	IRN	Akbar Sadeghi (to Padideh)
10	FW	IRN	Reza Enayati (to Padideh)
23	FW	IRN	Keivan Amraei (to Padideh)
25	FW	IRN	Milad Soleiman Fallah (to Naft Masjed Soleyman)
20	DF	IRN	Majid Heidari (to Esteghlal Khuzestan)
30	FW	IRN	Mehdi Momeni (to Esteghlal Khuzestan)
33	GK	IRN	Shahram Mehraban (to Shahrdari Bandar Abbas)
21	GK	IRN	Mohsen Ahmadi (Released)
9	FW	IRN	Farid Karimi (on loan at Tractor Sazi)
14	DF	IRN	Saeid Lotfi (to Naft Tehran)
11	DF	IRN	Majid Houtan (to Nassaji)
3	DF	IRN	Mehdi Mohammadi (to Giti Pasand)
5	DF	IRN	Mojtaba Mobini Pour (to Vahdat Qom)
12	MF	IRN	Mohammad Arab Khorasani (to Vahdat Qom)
18	DF	IRN	Mahmoud Shafiei (Released)
19	FW	IRN	Hamid Reza Pakizeh (to Vahdat Qom)
24	MF	IRN	Hamed Pouromrani (to Damash)
27	MF	IRN	Nima Zand (Released)
28	MF	IRN	Amir Mollajamali (to Vahdat Qom)
31	DF	IRN	Hadi Ali Zamani (Released)
32	DF	IRN	Ali Goudarzi (to Esteghlal Ahvaz)
2	DF	IRN	Morteza Kashi (Released)

=== Saipa ===
Head coach: Majid Jalali
Remaining Pro League quota: 1

In: Note: Flags indicate national team as defined under FIFA eligibility rules; some limited exceptions apply. Players may hold more than one non-FIFA nationality.

No.	Pos.	Nation	Player
23	FW	IRN	Mehdi Seyed-Salehi (from Persepolis)
10	FW	IRN	Milad Meydavoodi (from Esteghlal Khuzestan)
1	GK	IRN	Hamed Fallahzadeh (from Rah Ahan)
17	FW	IRN	Hakim Nassari (from Naft Masjed Soleyman)
11	FW	IRN	Milad Kermani (from Paykan)
14	FW	IRN	Mohammad Nozhati (from Fajr Sepasi)
26	DF	IRN	Masih Zahedi (from Shahrdari Ardabil)
61	MF	IRN	Masoud Ebrahimzadeh (from Tractor Sazi)
15	MF	IRN	Mojtaba Ramezani (from Nassaji)
28	MF	IRN	Ali Nademi (from Aboumoslem)
3	DF	IRN	Vahid Mohammadzadeh (from Mes Rafsanjan)
6	FW	IRN	Mobin Mir Doraghi (from Paykan)
33	GK	IRN	Mohammad Hossein Akbar Monadi (from Gahar Zagros U19)
35	FW	IRN	Amir Hossein Vosough (promoted from Saipa U21)

Out: Note: Flags indicate national team as defined under FIFA eligibility rules; some limited exceptions apply. Players may hold more than one non-FIFA nationality.

No.	Pos.	Nation	Player
1	GK	IRN	Mohammad Bagher Sadeghi (to Zob Ahan)
10	FW	IRN	Sajjad Shahbazzadeh (to Esteghlal)
6	MF	IRN	Eshagh Sobhani (to Pas Hamedan)
34	MF	IRN	Reza Nasehi (to Padideh)
3	MF	IRN	Mehdi Jafarpour (to Shahrdari Tabriz)
9	FW	IRN	Meghdad Ghobakhlou (to Sanat Naft)
30	GK	IRN	Vahid Mehdikhani (to Nassaji)
44	MF	IRN	Mohammadreza Zeynalkheyri (to Naft Gachsaran)
55	FW	IRN	Ali Younesi (to Pas Hamedan)
20	DF	IRN	Sadegh Moradzadeh (to Nirouye Zamini)

=== Sepahan ===
Head coach: (Croatia) Zlatko Kranjčar
Remaining Pro League quota: 1

In: Note: Flags indicate national team as defined under FIFA eligibility rules; some limited exceptions apply. Players may hold more than one non-FIFA nationality.

No.	Pos.	Nation	Player
8	MF	IRN	Rasoul Navidkia (from Naft Tehran)
9	MF	IRN	Mohammadreza Khalatbari (from Perseplis)
10	DF	IRN	Abdollah Karami (from Foolad)
16	FW	IRN	Erfan Maftoolkar (from Sepahan U21)
21	MF	IRN	Vouria Ghafouri (from Naft Tehran)
27	GK	IRN	Mehdi Sedghian (promoted from Sepahan U21)
29	FW	BRA	Luciano Pereira (from Foolad)
37	FW	IRN	Hossein Fazeli (from Fajr Sepasi)
25	DF	IRN	Mohsen Aghaei (promoted from Sepahan U21)
53	FW	IRN	Mehdi Alimoradi (promoted from Sepahan U21)

Out: Note: Flags indicate national team as defined under FIFA eligibility rules; some limited exceptions apply. Players may hold more than one non-FIFA nationality.

No.	Pos.	Nation	Player
9	FW	IRN	Mohammad Gholami (to Rah Ahan)
11	DF	IRN	Mohsen Irannejad (to Rah Ahan, previously on loan at ZobAhan)
15	MF	IRN	Omid Ebrahimi (to Esteghlal)
16	FW	IDN	Sergio van Dijk (to (Thailand) Suphanburi)
26	FW	IRN	Ali Choupani (On Loan at Padideh)
30	DF	IRN	Ahmad Eskandari (to Padideh)
30	GK	IRN	Mohammad Nasseri (to Gostaresh, previously on loan)
32	MF	IRN	Hamid Reza Kazemi (to Saba Qom)
36	GK	IRN	Mohammad Mahmoudvand (Released)
38	MF	ALB	Ervin Bulku (to (Albania) Tirana)
45	MF	IRN	Ehsan Pahlavan (Loan Return to Zob Ahan)
88	MF	IRN	Yaghoub Karimi (on loan at Esteghlal)

=== Tractor Sazi ===
Head coach: Rasoul Khatibi
Remaining Pro League quota: 1

In: Note: Flags indicate national team as defined under FIFA eligibility rules; some limited exceptions apply. Players may hold more than one non-FIFA nationality.

No.	Pos.	Nation	Player
7	MF	IRN	Saman Nariman Jahan (on loan from Gostaresh Foolad)
9	FW	IRN	Farid Karimi (on loan from Saba Qom)
8	FW	IRN	Shahin Saghebi (on loan from Malavan)
4	DF	IRN	Khaled Shafiei (from Gostaresh Foolad)
23	DF	IRN	Mirhani Hashemi (from Padideh)
12	MF	IRN	Mohammad Pour Rahmatollah (on loan from Malavan)
5	DF	IRN	Ahmad Alenemeh (from Naft Tehran)
15	DF	ALB	Ditmar Bicaj (from (Albania) Skënderbeu)
17	FW	IRQ	Alaa Abdul-Zahra (from (Iraq) Dohuk)
18	MF	IRN	Ahmad Amir Kamdar (from Gostaresh Foolad)
30	FW	BRA	Edinho (from Mes Kerman)
29	MF	IRN	Peyman Keshavarz (promoted from Tractor Sazi U21)

Out: Note: Flags indicate national team as defined under FIFA eligibility rules; some limited exceptions apply. Players may hold more than one non-FIFA nationality.

No.	Pos.	Nation	Player
20	DF	IRN	Mohammad Nosrati (to Paykan)
88	DF	IRN	Morteza Asadi (to Gostaresh Foolad)
7	MF	IRN	Mehdi Karimian (to Esteghlal)
8	MF	IRN	Ali Karimi (Retired)
10	FW	IRN	Saeid Daghighi (to Paykan)
13	MF	IRN	Masoud Ebrahimzadeh (to Saipa)
9	FW	IRN	Javad Kazemian (Released)
17	MF	IRN	Meysam Baou (Released)
28	MF	IRN	Mohammad Hossein Mehrazma (Released)
29	DF	IRN	Navid Khosh Hava (Released)
11	FW	IRN	Karim Ansarifard (to (Spain) Osasuna)
4	DF	IRN	Farshid Talebi (Released)
32	DF	IRN	Firouz Pashapour (Released)
26	DF	IRN	Mohammad Ebadzadeh (Released)

=== Zob Ahan ===
Head coach: Yahya Golmohammadi
Remaining Pro League quota: 1

In: Note: Flags indicate national team as defined under FIFA eligibility rules; some limited exceptions apply. Players may hold more than one non-FIFA nationality.

No.	Pos.	Nation	Player
15	MF	IRN	Ehsan Pahlavan (Loan Return from Sepahan)
7	MF	IRN	Mohsen Mosalman (Loan Return from Persepolis)
1	GK	IRN	Mohammad Bagher Sadeghi (from Saipa)
16	MF	IRN	Hojjat Haghverdi (from Aboumoslem)
19	MF	IRN	Mehrdad Ghanbari (from Padideh)
2	DF	IRN	Hadi Mohammadi (from Damash)
17	FW	IRN	Masoud Hassanzadeh (from Damash)
5	MF	IRN	Ghasem Dehnavi (from Persepolis)
9	FW	IRN	Mostafa Shojaei (from Mes Kerman)
23	FW	IRN	Danial Esmaeilifar (from Payam Sanat Amol)
21	DF	IRN	Saeb Mohebi (from Caspian Qazvin)
34	MF	IRN	Mohammadreza Baouj (promoted from Zob Ahan U19)
25	FW	IRN	Mohammadreza Abbasi (promoted from Zob Ahan U19)
32	FW	IRN	Amin Nasiri (promoted from Zob Ahan U21)
36	FW	IRN	Farshad Mohammadi (promoted from Zob Ahan U21)
24	MF	IRN	Hossein Doustdar (from Giti Pasand)
13	DF	IRN	Pouria Seifpanahi (from Mes Kerman)
18	DF	LBN	Ali Hamam (from (Lebanon) Nejmeh SC)

Out: Note: Flags indicate national team as defined under FIFA eligibility rules; some limited exceptions apply. Players may hold more than one non-FIFA nationality.

No.	Pos.	Nation	Player
13	DF	IRN	Mohsen Irannejad (Loan Return to Sepahan)
70	DF	IRN	Mohammadreza Khanzadeh (Loan Return to Persepolis)
99	MF	IRN	Milad Gharibi (Loan Return to Persepolis)
9	FW	IRN	Mohsen Bayatinia (Released)
26	GK	MNE	Milan Mijatovic (Released)
77	FW	COL	Víctor Guazá (Released)
3	DF	IRN	Sepehr Heidari (Released)
7	DF	IRN	Mohammad Salsali (to Giti Pasand)
16	MF	IRN	Farshad Bahadorani (Released)
17	DF	IRN	Hamid Parvar (Released)
20	DF	IRN	Saeid Abdollahpour (to Giti Pasand)
21	MF	IRN	Mehran Ghasemi (to Giti Pasand)
23	FW	IRN	Rouhollah Arab (Released)
31	DF	IRN	Oveis Kordjahan (Released)
36	MF	IRN	Pejman Ghermezi (Released)
33	GK	IRN	Amir Meghdad Maleki (to Pas Hamedan)
—	MF	IRN	Mostafa Hashemi (to Nassaji)

== Azadegan League ==
=== Damash ===
Head coach: Omid Harandi

In: Note: Flags indicate national team as defined under FIFA eligibility rules; some limited exceptions apply. Players may hold more than one non-FIFA nationality.

No.	Pos.	Nation	Player
16	DF	IRN	Mehdi Kiani (from Aboomoslem)
10	FW	IRN	Afshin Chavoshi (from Aluminium Hormozgan)
4	MF	IRN	Behnam Asgharkhani (from Alvand)
2	DF	IRN	Amir Tizrou (from Gostaresh)
3	DF	IRN	Hassan Najafi (from Esteghlal Ahvaz)
29	MF	IRN	Kianoosh Mirzaei (from Gostaresh)
6	DF	IRN	Mohammad Rostami (from Aboomoslem)
20	MF	IRN	Amin Torkashvand (from Paykan)
12	MF	IRN	Milad Ghorbanzadeh (from Caspian Qazvin)
1	GK	IRN	Mehdi Rahimzadeh (from Malavan)
14	FW	IRN	Saeed Esmaeilipour (promoted from Damash U21)
19	DF	IRN	Mahyar Nouri (promoted from Damash U21)
34	DF	IRN	Adel Masoudifar (from Persepolis Shomal)
40	GK	IRN	Reza Gholampour (promoted from Damash U21)
26	FW	IRN	Saeed Talebi (promoted from Damash U21)
7	MF	IRN	Hamed Pouromrani (from Saba Qom)
25	DF	IRN	Mohammadreza Mehdizadeh (promoted from Damash U21)
23	MF	IRN	Kianoosh Parhizkar (from Rahpoyan Rezvanshahr)
27	DF	IRN	Amirreza Ghamnak (promoted from Damash U21)
28	MF	IRN	Saleh Norouzpour (promoted from Damash U21)
24	MF	IRN	Vahid Hosseinzade (from Steel Azin)

Out: Note: Flags indicate national team as defined under FIFA eligibility rules; some limited exceptions apply. Players may hold more than one non-FIFA nationality.

No.	Pos.	Nation	Player
27	FW	IRN	Rouhollah Seifollahi (to Esteghlal Khuzestan)
11	MF	IRN	Mohammad Reza Mahdavi (to Esteghlal Khuzestan)
14	MF	IRN	Reza Kardoust (to Esteghlal Khuzestan)
20	DF	IRN	Mohammad Mokhtari (to Gostaresh)
1	GK	IRN	Milad Farahani (to Saba)
29	DF	IRN	Hadi Mohammadi (to Zob Ahan)
17	FW	IRN	Masoud Hassanzadeh (to Zob Ahan)
8	DF	IRN	Alireza Nazifkar (to Mes Kerman)
2	DF	IRN	Mohammad Siah (to Aluminium)
4	MF	IRN	Abolfazl Hajizadeh (Released)
6	MF	IRN	Morteza Ebrahimi (Retired)
16	MF	IRN	Rasoul Soroushnia (to Mes Rafsanjan)
21	DF	IRN	Abouzar Rahimi (to Etka Gorgan)
22	GK	IRN	Habib Dehghani (to Mes Rafsanjan)
7	FW	IRN	Amin Motevaselzadeh (to Mes Rafsanjan)
12	MF	IRN	Mostafa Hajati (to Sepidrood)
18	FW	IRN	Mohammadreza Almaskhale (to Sepidrood)
28	MF	IRN	ARmin Monfared Doust (to Fajr Sepasi)

=== Mes Kerman ===
Head coach: Akbar Misaghian

In: Note: Flags indicate national team as defined under FIFA eligibility rules; some limited exceptions apply. Players may hold more than one non-FIFA nationality.

No.	Pos.	Nation	Player
—	DF	IRN	Alireza Nazifkar (from Damash)
—	DF	IRN	Fardin Abedini (from Gostaresh)
—	FW	IRN	Abbas Pourkhosravani (from Padideh)
—	FW	IRN	Bahman Tahmasebi (from Padideh)
—	MF	IRN	Behtash Misaghian (from Padideh)

Out: Note: Flags indicate national team as defined under FIFA eligibility rules; some limited exceptions apply. Players may hold more than one non-FIFA nationality.

No.	Pos.	Nation	Player
9	FW	IRN	Mostafa Shojaei (to Zob Ahan)
24	MF	IRN	Mohammad Abshak (to Rah Ahan)
90	DF	IRN	Sheys Rezaei (to Rah Ahan)
22	FW	IRN	Ahmad Hassanzadeh (to Saba)
30	FW	BRA	Edinho (to Tractor Sazi)
14	DF	IRN	Pouria Seifpanahi (to Zob Ahan)
17	MF	IRN	Milad Jahani (to Gostaresh)
