= 2014–15 Esteghlal Khuzestan F.C. season =

Esteghlal Khuzestan
2014–15 season
- Manager: Abdollah Veisi
- Stadium: Takhti Stadium
- Persian Gulf Cup: 14th
- Hazfi Cup: Sixth Round vs Zob Ahan

The 2014–15 season are the Esteghlal Khuzestan Football Club's second season in the Iran Pro League and the top division of Iranian football. They are also competing in the Hazfi Cup.

== Squad ==
Note: Flags indicate national team as defined under FIFA eligibility rules; some limited exceptions apply. Players may hold more than one non-FIFA nationality.

| No. | Pos. | Nation | Player |
|---|---|---|---|
| 1 | GK | IRI | Parviz Karimi |
| 2 | DF | IRI | Mohammad Tayyebi |
| 3 | DF | IRI | Majid Heidari |
| 4 | DF | IRI | Mohammad Ebrahim Khosravi |
| 5 | MF | MLI | Moussa Coulibaly |
| 6 | MF | IRI | Meysam Doraghi |
| 7 | MF | IRI | Hadi Khanifar |
| 8 | MF | IRI | Reza Kardoust |
| 9 | FW | MLI | Lamine Diawara |
| 10 | FW | IRI | Mehdi Momeni |
| 11 | MF | IRI | Mohammad Reza Mahdavi |
| 12 | DF | IRI | Milad Rabbani ^{U23} |
| 14 | MF | IRI | Hamed Mohammadi ^{U23} |
| 16 | GK | MLI | Soumbeïla Diakité |
| 17 | FW | IRI | Rouhollah Seifollahi |
| 19 | MF | IRI | Yazdan Abbasian ^{U23} |

| No. | Pos. | Nation | Player |
|---|---|---|---|
| 20 | MF | IRI | Meysam Majidi |
| 21 | MF | IRI | Meysam Baou |
| 22 | GK | IRI | Vahid Mashilashi ^{U21} |
| 24 | FW | IRI | Hojjat Chaharmahali |
| 25 | DF | IRI | Farzad Jafari ^{U23} |
| 26 | MF | IRI | Ali Daghagheleh ^{U21} |
| 27 | MF | IRI | Hamdollah Ebdam ^{U23} |
| 28 | DF | IRI | Bagher Hashemi ^{U21} |
| 29 | FW | IRI | Ali Ebrahimpour ^{U21} |
| 31 | DF | IRI | Elyas Vashahi ^{U21} |
| 32 | MF | IRI | Mohammad Ali Safia ^{U21} |
| 33 | GK | IRI | Ali Akbar Ahaki ^{U23} |
| 34 | MF | IRI | Iman Basafa ^{U23} (on loan from Esteghlal) |
| 88 | DF | IRI | Mohsen Bayat |
| 99 | FW | IRI | Mehdi Seyed Salehi |

=== Out on loan ===
Note: Flags indicate national team as defined under FIFA eligibility rules; some limited exceptions apply. Players may hold more than one non-FIFA nationality.

| No. | Pos. | Nation | Player |
|---|---|---|---|
| — | DF | IRI | Ramtin Soleimanzadeh (at Fajr Sepasi until 30 June 2015) |

== Transfers ==
=== Summer ===
In: Note: Flags indicate national team as defined under FIFA eligibility rules; some limited exceptions apply. Players may hold more than one non-FIFA nationality.

| No. | Pos. | Nation | Player |
|---|---|---|---|
| 3 | DF | IRI | Majid Heidari (from Saba Qom) |
| 14 | MF | IRI | Iman Basafa (on loan from Esteghlal) |
| 17 | FW | IRI | Rouhollah Seifollahi (from Damash) |
| 11 | MF | IRI | Mohammad Reza Mahdavi (from Damash) |
| 8 | MF | IRI | Reza Kardoust (from Damash) |
| 10 | FW | IRI | Mehdi Momeni (from Saba Qom) |
| 20 | MF | IRI | Meysam Majidi (from Aluminium) |
| 6 | MF | IRI | Meysam Doraghi (from Naft Masjed Soleyman) |
| 15 | FW | IRI | Sadegh Sadeghi Baba-Ahmadi (from Naft Masjed Soleyman) |
| 12 | DF | IRI | Milad Rabbani (from Niroye Zamini) |
| 19 | MF | IRI | Yazdan Abbasian (from Gahar) |
| 16 | GK | MLI | Soumbeïla Diakité (from (Mali) Stade Malien) |
| 9 | FW | MLI | Lamine Diawara (from (Mali) Stade Malien) |
| 27 | MF | IRI | Hamdollah Ebdam (promoted from Esteghlal Khuzestan U21) |
| 28 | DF | IRI | Bagher Hashemi (promoted from Esteghlal Khuzestan U21) |
| 22 | GK | IRI | Vahid Mashilashi (promoted from Esteghlal Khuzestan U21) |
| 26 | MF | IRI | Ali Daghagheleh (promoted from Esteghlal Khuzestan U21) |
| 29 | FW | IRI | Ali Ebrahimpour (promoted from Esteghlal Khuzestan U21) |
| 31 | DF | IRI | Elyas Vashahi (promoted from Esteghlal Khuzestan U21) |
| 32 | MF | IRI | Mohammad Ali Safia (promoted from Esteghlal Khuzestan U21) |

Out: Note: Flags indicate national team as defined under FIFA eligibility rules; some limited exceptions apply. Players may hold more than one non-FIFA nationality.

| No. | Pos. | Nation | Player |
|---|---|---|---|
| 1 | GK | BRA | Fábio Carvalho (Released) |
| 4 | DF | IRI | Sohrab Bakhtiarizadeh (Retired) |
| 7 | FW | IRI | Mehdi Chahkoutahzadeh (to Fajr Sepasi) |
| 8 | MF | MLI | Idrissa Traoré (to (Mali) Djoliba) |
| 9 | MF | IRI | Mahmoud Tighnavard (to Naft Masjed Soleyman) |
| 10 | FW | IRI | Milad Meydavoudi (to Saipa) |
| 11 | FW | IRI | Mohammad Moaavi (to Esteghlal Ahvaz) |
| 13 | DF | IRI | Hossein Kaabi (Released) |
| 14 | MF | IRI | Mehdi Kheiri (to Padideh) |
| 15 | MF | IRI | Karim Shaverdi (to Esteghlal Ahvaz) |
| 19 | FW | IRI | Ali Bigdeli (to Iranjavan) |
| 21 | MF | IRI | Shahrokh Shams (Released) |
| 24 | DF | IRI | Ala Khalafzadeh (Released) |
| 26 | DF | IRI | Mohammad Mad Malisi (to Naft Masjed Soleyman) |
| 27 | FW | IRI | Ehsan Alvanzadeh (to Naft Masjed Soleyman) |
| 35 | FW | IRI | Sajjad Ghasemnejad (Released) |
| 40 | MF | IRI | Adel Kolahkaj (Released) |
| 66 | DF | IRI | Saeid Chahjouei (to Esteghlal Ahvaz) |

=== Winter ===
In: Note: Flags indicate national team as defined under FIFA eligibility rules; some limited exceptions apply. Players may hold more than one non-FIFA nationality.

| No. | Pos. | Nation | Player |
|---|---|---|---|
| 21 | MF | IRI | Meysam Baou (from Free Agent) |
| 24 | FW | IRI | Hojjat Chaharmahali (from Free Agent) |
| 99 | FW | IRI | Mehdi Seyed Salehi (from Saipa) |
| 88 | DF | IRI | Mohsen Bayat (from Saba Qom) |
| 14 | MF | IRI | Hamed Mohammadi (from Free Agent) |

Out: Note: Flags indicate national team as defined under FIFA eligibility rules; some limited exceptions apply. Players may hold more than one non-FIFA nationality.

| No. | Pos. | Nation | Player |
|---|---|---|---|
| 13 | FW | IRI | Ebrahim Salehi (Conscription) |
| 23 | FW | IRI | Hassan Moaavi (to Nirouye Zamini – Conscription) |
| 15 | FW | IRI | Sadegh Sadeghi Baba-Ahmadi (to Esteghlal Ahvaz) |
| 30 | FW | IRI | Mohammad Ousani (to Saba Qom) |

== Competitions ==
=== Iran Pro League ===
==== Standings ====
| Pos | Team | Pld | W | D | L | GF | GA | GD | Pts | Qualification or relegation |
|---|---|---|---|---|---|---|---|---|---|---|
| 12 | Rah Ahan | 30 | 8 | 7 | 15 | 27 | 48 | −21 | 31 | |
| 13 | Malavan | 30 | 6 | 12 | 12 | 26 | 34 | −8 | 30 | |
| 14 | Est. Khuzestan (O) | 30 | 4 | 15 | 11 | 35 | 46 | −11 | 27 | Qualification to relegation play-offs |
| 15 | Paykan (R) | 30 | 4 | 14 | 12 | 16 | 29 | −13 | 26 | Relegation to 2015–16 Azadegan League |
| 16 | Naft Masjed Soleyman (R) | 30 | 3 | 13 | 14 | 19 | 39 | −20 | 22 | Relegation to 2015–16 Azadegan League |

Updated to match(es) played on 15 May 2015. Source: FIFA.com
Rules for classification: 1) points; 2) goal difference; 3) number of goals scored.
(O) Play-off winners; (R) Relegated

==== Results summary ====
| Overall | | | | | | | | Home | | | | | | Away | | | | | |
| Pld | W | D | L | GF | GA | GD | Pts | W | D | L | GF | GA | GD | W | D | L | GF | GA | GD |
|---|---|---|---|---|---|---|---|---|---|---|---|---|---|---|---|---|---|---|---|
| 0 | 0 | 0 | 0 | 0 | 0 | 0 | 0 | 0 | 0 | 0 | 0 | 0 | 0 | 0 | 0 | 0 | 0 | 0 | 0 |

Last updated: 11 April 2014.
Source: Match reports

==== Results by round ====
| Round | 1 | 2 | 3 | 4 | 5 | 6 | 7 | 8 | 9 | 10 | 11 | 12 | 13 | 14 | 15 | 16 | 17 | 18 | 19 | 20 | 21 | 22 | 23 | 24 | 25 | 26 | 27 | 28 | 29 | 30 |
|---|---|---|---|---|---|---|---|---|---|---|---|---|---|---|---|---|---|---|---|---|---|---|---|---|---|---|---|---|---|---|
| Ground | | | | | | | | | | | | | | | | | | | | | | | | | | | | | | |
| Result | D | L | L | L | D | D | D | W | D | L | W | D | L | W | D | D | D | D | L | L | L | D | W | L | D | D | D | L | L | D |
| Position | 8 | 11 | 15 | 16 | 15 | 14 | 15 | 11 | 12 | 14 | 11 | 11 | 12 | 12 | 12 | 11 | 11 | 11 | 12 | 12 | 13 | 13 | 12 | 12 | 14 | 13 | 13 | 13 | 14 | 14 |

Updated to match(es) played on 11 April 2014. Source: Match reports
A = Away; H = Home; W = Win; D = Draw; L = Loss

==== Matches ====
| 1 August 2014 1 | Esteghlal Khuzestan | 1 – 1 | Gostaresh Foulad | Ahvaz |
| 19:40 UTC+4:30 | Seifollahi 90'; Mahdavi (yellow card) | Summary | Kardoust (yellow card) 46'; Jokar (yellow card) | Stadium: Ghadir Stadium; Referee: Mohammad Hossein Zahedifar |

| 8 August 2014 2 | Esteghlal | 1 – 0 | Esteghlal Khuzestan | Tehran |
| 19:30 UTC+4:30 | Shahbazzadeh 90+2'; Teymourian (yellow card) | Summary | Khanifar (yellow card); Coulibaly (yellow card) | Stadium: Azadi Stadium; Referee: Mehdi Seyedali |

| 15 August 2014 3 | Esteghlal Khuzestan | 1 – 2 | Naft Tehran | Ahvaz |
| 19:25 UTC+4:30 | Coulibaly 86' | Summary | Kamyabinia 54'; Wirikom 87'; Pouraliganji (yellow card); Ghorbani (yellow card) | Stadium: Takhti Stadium; Referee: Mohammad Maleki |

| 19 August 2014 4 | Foolad | 1 – 0 | Esteghlal Khuzestan | Ahvaz |
| 19:25 UTC+4:30 | Vakia 12' | Summary | Khanifar (red card) 72'; Heidari (yellow card); Seifollahi (yellow card) | Stadium: Takhti Stadium; Referee: Gholamreza Jabbari |

| 24 August 2014 5 | Esteghlal Khuzestan | 1 – 1 | Zob Ahan | Ahvaz |
| 19:15 UTC+4:30 | Abbasian 86' (yellow card); Seifollahi (yellow card); Heidari (yellow card); Moaavi (yellow card) | Summary | Mohammadi (yellow card) (yellow-red card) 69'; Tabrizi 74'; Carlos (yellow card) | Stadium: Takhti Stadium; Referee: Babak Vasilehbar |

| 30 August 2014 6 | Malavan | 1 – 1 | Esteghlal Khuzestan | Bandar-e Anzali |
| 18:00 UTC+4:30 | Rafkhaei 71'; Hosseini (yellow card); Maeboodi (yellow card) | Summary | Seifollahi 16' (yellow card); Diakité (red card) 68'; Tayyebi (yellow card) | Stadium: Takhti Stadium; Referee: Omid Saeidfar |

| 4 September 2014 7 | Esteghlal Khuzestan | 1 – 1 | Padideh Khorasan | Ahvaz |
| 19:00 UTC+4:30 | Majidi 86' (pen.); Baba-Ahmadi (yellow card); Diawara (yellow card) | Summary | Enayati 90+2' (pen.); Prahić (yellow card); Nasehi (yellow card); Sadeghi (yellow card) | Stadium: Takhti Stadium; Referee: Payam Heydari |

| 12 September 2014 8 | Saba Qom | 1 – 2 | Esteghlal Khuzestan | Qom |
| 18:45 UTC+4:30 | Hassanzadeh 2'; Aramtab (yellow card); Alimohammadi (yellow card) | Summary | Majidi 59'; Basafa 79'; Seifollahi (yellow card) | Stadium: Yadegar-e Emam Stadium; Referee: Turaj Haghverdi |

| 18 September 2014 9 | Esteghlal Khuzestan | 2 – 2 | Tractor Sazi | Ahvaz |
| 18:40 UTC+4:30 | Majidi 41' (pen.) (yellow card); Seifollahi 51' (yellow card); Coulibaly (yellow card) | Summary | Edinho 39'; Delir 80'; Iranpourian (yellow card) | Stadium: Takhti Stadium; Referee: Reza Adel |

| 25 September 2014 10 | Persepolis | 2 – 1 | Esteghlal Khuzestan | Tehran |
| 19:30 UTC+4:30 | Abbaszadeh 31', 45+2' (pen.) | Summary | Momeni 13'; Momeni (yellow card); Khanifar (yellow card); Coulibaly (yellow card) | Stadium: Azadi Stadium; Referee: Gholamreza Jabbari |

| 2 October 2014 11 | Esteghlal Khuzestan | 1 – 0 | Rah Ahan Yazdan | Ahvaz |
| 18:20 UTC+4:30 | Majidi 5'; Coulibaly (red card) 90'; Mahdavi (red card) 90+10'; Seifollahi (yellow card) | Summary | Irannejad (red card) 51'; Abshak (red card) 65' | Stadium: Ghadir Stadium; Referee: Mohammad Zahedifar |

| 21 October 2014 12 | Esteghlal Khuzestan | 0 – 0 | Naft Masjed Soleyman | Ahvaz |
| 18:00 UTC+4:30 | Heidari (yellow card); Khosravi (yellow card); Kardoust (yellow card) | Summary | | Stadium: Ghadir Stadium; Referee: Ahmad Salehi |

| 31 October 2014 13 | Sepahan | 3 – 2 | Esteghlal Khuzestan | Fuladshahr |
| 16:30 UTC+4:30 | Sharifi 45+1', 78'; Ghafouri 64'; M.Ahmadi (yellow card) | Summary | Ousani 29' (yellow card); Seifollahi 51' (yellow card); Heidari (yellow card) | Stadium: Foolad Shahr Stadium; Referee: Yadollah Jahanbazi |

| 14 | – |
| UTC+4:30 | [ Summary] |

| 15 | – |
| UTC+4:30 | [ Summary] |

| 16 | – |
| UTC+4:30 | [ Summary] |

| 17 | – |
| UTC+4:30 | [ Summary] |

| 18 | – |
| UTC+4:30 | [ Summary] |

| 19 | – |
| UTC+4:30 | [ Summary] |

| 20 | – |
| UTC+4:30 | [ Summary] |

| 21 | – |
| UTC+4:30 | [ Summary] |

| 22 | – |
| UTC+4:30 | [ Summary] |

| 23 | – |
| UTC+4:30 | [ Summary] |

| 24 | – |
| UTC+4:30 | [ Summary] |

| 25 | – |
| UTC+4:30 | [ Summary] |

| 26 | – |
| UTC+4:30 | [ Summary] |

| 27 | – |
| UTC+4:30 | [ Summary] |

| 28 | – |
| UTC+4:30 | [ Summary] |

| 29 | – |
| UTC+4:30 | [ Summary] |

| 30 | – |
| UTC+4:30 | [ Summary] |

==== Relegation play-off ====
| 25 May 2015 1st leg | Esteghlal Khuzestan | 1 – 0 | Mes Kerman | Ahvaz |
| 18:30 UTC+4:30 | Momeni 90+4'; Tayyebi (yellow card); Seifollahi (yellow card) | Summary | M.Esmaeili Beigi (yellow card) | Stadium: Ghadir Stadium; Referee: Seyed Zargar |

| 30 May 2015 2nd leg | Mes Kerman | 0 – 2 (0 – 3 agg.) | Esteghlal Khuzestan | Kerman |
| 18:00 UTC+4:30 | Sangchouli (yellow card); Nazifkar (yellow card); Eslami (yellow card) | Summary | Diawara 57', 87'; Bayat (yellow card) | Stadium: Shahid Bahonar Stadium; Referee: Yadollah Jahanbazi |

=== Hazfi Cup ===
| 16 October 2014 Fifth Round | Fajr Sepasi | 1 – 3 | Esteghlal Khuzestan | Shiraz |
| 14:30 UTC+4:30 | Mardani 67' | [ Summary] | Majidi 17'; Momeni 34'; Diawara 44' | Stadium: Hafezieh Stadium; Attendance: 7,000 |

| 26 October 2014 Sixth Round | Esteghlal Khuzestan | 2 – 3 | Zob Ahan | Ahvaz |
| 15:00 UTC+4:30 | Majidi 75'; Seifollahi 90+4' | [ Summary] | Dehnavi 37'; Rajabzadeh 48' (pen.), 90+2' | Stadium: Ghadir Stadium; Attendance: 2,000 |

== Squad statistics ==
=== Appearances and goals ===
| No. | Pos | Nat | Player | Total | | Iran Pro League | | Playoffs | | Hazfi Cup | |
| No. | Pos | Nat | Player | Apps | Goals | Apps | Goals | Apps | Goals | Apps | Goals |
|---|---|---|---|---|---|---|---|---|---|---|---|
| 2 | DF | (Iran) IRI | Mohammad Tayyebi | 2 | 0 | 0 | 0 | 2 | 0 | 0 | 0 |
| 5 | DF | (Mali) MLI | Moussa Coulibaly | 2 | 0 | 0 | 0 | 2 | 0 | 0 | 0 |
| 6 | MF | (Iran) IRI | Meysam Doraghi | 2 | 0 | 0 | 0 | 2 | 0 | 0 | 0 |
| 7 | MF | (Iran) IRI | Hadi Khanifar | 2 | 0 | 0 | 0 | 1+1 | 0 | 0 | 0 |
| 8 | MF | (Iran) IRI | Reza Kardoust | 1 | 0 | 0 | 0 | 1 | 0 | 0 | 0 |
| 9 | FW | (Mali) MLI | Lamine Diawara | 1 | 2 | 0 | 0 | 1 | 2 | 0 | 0 |
| 10 | FW | (Iran) IRI | Mehdi Momeni | 2 | 1 | 0 | 0 | 2 | 1 | 0 | 0 |
| 11 | MF | (Iran) IRI | Mohammad Reza Mahdavi | 1 | 0 | 0 | 0 | 0+1 | 0 | 0 | 0 |
| 16 | GK | (Mali) MLI | Soumbeïla Diakité | 2 | 0 | 0 | 0 | 2 | 0 | 0 | 0 |
| 17 | FW | (Iran) IRI | Rouhollah Seifollahi | 2 | 0 | 0 | 0 | 1+1 | 0 | 0 | 0 |
| 20 | DF | (Iran) IRI | Meysam Majidi | 2 | 0 | 0 | 0 | 2 | 0 | 0 | 0 |
| 21 | MF | (Iran) IRI | Maysam Baou | 2 | 0 | 0 | 0 | 2 | 0 | 0 | 0 |
| 24 | FW | (Iran) IRI | Hojjat Chaharmahali | 1 | 0 | 0 | 0 | 0+1 | 0 | 0 | 0 |
| 27 | MF | (Iran) IRI | Hamdollah Ebdam | 1 | 0 | 0 | 0 | 1 | 0 | 0 | 0 |
| 28 | DF | (Iran) IRI | Bagher Hashemi | 2 | 0 | 0 | 0 | 1+1 | 0 | 0 | 0 |
| 88 | DF | (Iran) IRI | Mohsen Bayat | 2 | 0 | 0 | 0 | 2 | 0 | 0 | 0 |
Players who left Esteghlal Khuzestan during the season:

=== Goal scorers ===
| Place | Position | Nation | Number | Name | Persian Gulf Cup | Relegation Playoff | Hazfi Cup | Total |
|---|---|---|---|---|---|---|---|---|
| 1 | FW | (Mali) | 9 | Lamine Diawara | 0 | 2 | 1 | 3 |
| 2 | FW | (Iran) | 10 | Mehdi Momeni | 0 | 1 | 1 | 2 |
| 2 | MF | (Iran) | 20 | Meysam Majidi | 0 | 0 | 2 | 2 |
| 4 | FW | (Iran) | 17 | Rouhollah Seifollahi | 0 | 0 | 1 | 1 |
| TOTALS | | | | | 0 | 3 | 5 | 8 |

=== Disciplinary record ===
| Number | Nation | Position | Name | Persian Gulf Cup | | Relegation Playoff | | Hazfi Cup | | Total | |
| Number | Nation | Position | Name | Yellow card | Red card | Yellow card | Red card | Yellow card | Red card | Yellow card | Red card |
| 2 | (Iran) | DF | Mohammad Tayyebi | 0 | 0 | 1 | 0 | 0 | 0 | 1 | 0 |
| 17 | (Iran) | FW | Rouhollah Seifollahi | 0 | 0 | 1 | 0 | 0 | 0 | 1 | 0 |
| 88 | (Iran) | DF | Mohsen Bayat | 0 | 0 | 1 | 0 | 0 | 0 | 1 | 0 |
| | | | TOTALS | 0 | 0 | 3 | 0 | 0 | 0 | 3 | 0 |
