= Milad Jalali =

Iranian footballer

Personal information
- Full name: Seyed Milad Jalali
- Date of birth: 13 January 1995 (age 31)
- Place of birth: Bandar-e Anzali, Iran
- Height: 1.90 m (6 ft 3 in)
- Position: Defensive midfielder

Team information
- Current team: Shahrdari Bandar Anzali
- Number: 9

Youth career
- –2014: Malavan

Senior career*
Years	Team	Apps	(Gls)
2014–2015	Malavan	2	(0)
2015–2016	Malavan Novin		
2016–2017	Malavan		
2017–2019	Chooka Talesh		
2019–2021	Shahrdari Bandar Anzali		
2021–2022	Malavan Novin		
2022–2023	Dezh Kasma		
2023–2024	Mirza Kochak		
2024–	Shahrdari Bandar Anzali		
- * Club domestic league appearances and goals as of 22 October 2014

Seyed Milad Jalali (Persian: سید میلاد جلالی; born 13 January 1995) is an Iranian football player who plays for Shahrdari Bandar Anzali.

== Club career ==
=== Malavan ===
He started his career with Malavan youth team. He was promoted to first team by Nosrat Irandoost in summer of 2014. He made his debut for Malavan in 2014–15 Iran Pro League against Sepahan as a substitute for Mahyar Zahmatkesh.

== Club career statistics ==
As of 22 October 2014.

Club	Division	Season	League		Hazfi Cup		Asia		Total	
Club	Division	Season	Apps	Goals	Apps	Goals	Apps	Goals	Apps	Goals
Malavan	Pro League	2014–15	2	0	0	0	–	–	2	0
Career Totals			2	0	0	0	0	0	2	0
