= Abtahi =

Abtahi is a surname. Notable people with the surname include:

- Mehdi Abtahi (born 1963), Iranian footballer and manager
- Milad Abtahi (born 1992), Iranian footballer
- Mohammad-Ali Abtahi (born 1958), Iranian theologian, scholar, and pro-democracy activist
- Omid Abtahi (born 1979), Iranian-American actor
