= Milad Nouri =

Milad Nouri may refer to:

- Milad Nouri (footballer, born 1993), Iranian football midfielder
- Milad Nouri (footballer, born 1986), Iranian football midfielder
