= Omid Singh =

Iranian footballer

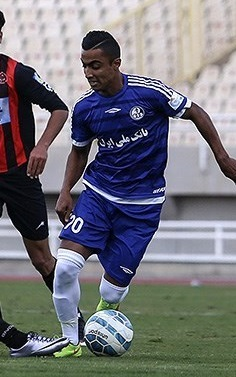
- Singh with Esteghlal Khuzestan in 2016

Personal information
- Date of birth: 9 January 1993 (age 33)
- Place of birth: Behbahan, Khuzestan, Iran
- Height: 1.76 m (5 ft 9 in)
- Position: Winger

Youth career
- 2011–2013: Foolad

Senior career*
Years	Team	Apps	(Gls)
2013	Gahar Zagros	5	(0)
2013–2014	Naft Masjed Soleyman	6	(0)
2014–2015	Esteghlal Ahvaz	16	(2)
2015–2016	Siah Jamegan	11	(1)
2016	Esteghlal Khuzestan	7	(0)
2016–2018	Pars Jonoubi	41	(7)
2018–2020	Nassaji	27	(0)
2020	Naft Masjed Soleyman	8	(2)
2020–2022	Aluminium Arak	33	(2)
2023–2024	Havadar	12	(1)
- * Club domestic league appearances and goals as of 1 June 2024

Omid Singh (Persian: امید سینگ; born 9 January 1993) is an Indian-Iranian professional footballer who plays as a midfielder.

== Career ==
Born in Behbahan, Khuzestan, Iran, Singh began his professional career playing for the Gahar Zagros in 2012–13 Persian Gulf Pro League. He then joined Naft Masjed the following season, and played in the Azadegan League.

In 2016, he joined Esteghlal Khuzestan and won his maiden Persian Gulf Pro League title. He joined Pars Jonoubi Jam the following season and played a pivotal role as Pars Jonoubi Jam won the Azadegan League title for the first time in their history.

On 5 April 2020, it was announced that then I-League side East Bengal FC roped in Singh on a two-year deal, however he has never appeared with the club in any league match. On 14 July 2021, FIFA asked SC East Bengal to pay the salary of Singh after the club refused to pay it. He later played for Persian Iranian football club Havadar in the Persian Gulf Pro League.

== Personal life ==
Singh was born and raised in Khuzestan, Iran. However, his father a Punjabi Sikh and carries an Indian passport, which makes him eligible to represent the India national team. In 2019, Singh expressed his desire to give up his Iranian citizenship and play for India after the national team coach Igor Štimac called him. He also holds the Overseas Citizenship of India card.

== Career statistics ==
As of 3 April 2020

Club	Season	League			Cup		Continental		Total	
Club	Season	Division	Apps	Goals	Apps	Goals	Apps	Goals	Apps	Goals
Gahar Zagros	2012–13	Persian Gulf Pro League	5	0	—	—	—	—	5	0
Naft Masjed	2013–14	Azadegan League	6	0	—	—	—	—	6	0
Esteghlal Ahvaz	2014–15	Azadegan League	16	2	—	—	—	—	16	2
Siah Jamegan	2015–16	Persian Gulf Pro League	11	1	1 (Note: Appearances in the Hazfi Cup)	0	—	—	12	1
Esteghlal Khuzestan	2015–16	Persian Gulf Pro League	7	0	0	0	—	—	7	0
Pars Jonoubi	2016–17	Azadegan League	23	3	1	0	—	—	24	3
Pars Jonoubi	2017–18	Persian Gulf Pro League	18	4	1	0	—	—	19	4
Nassaji	2018–19	Persian Gulf Pro League	23	0	1	0	—	—	24	0
Nassaji	2019–20	Persian Gulf Pro League	4	0	0	0	—	—	4	0
Naft Masjed	2019–20	Persian Gulf Pro League	4	1	0	0	—	—	4	1
Career total			117	11	4	0	—	—	121	11

== Honours ==
Esteghlal Khuzestan

- Persian Gulf Pro League: 2015–16

Pars Jonoubi

- Azadegan League: 2016–17
