= Ali Shafizadeh =

Iranian businessman

Shafizadeh علی شفیعی زاده
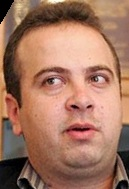
- Born: Iran
- Citizenship: Iran
- Occupation(s): Businessman, Owner and Chairman of Esteghlal Ahvaz F.C.

Ali Shafizadeh (Persian: علی شفیعی زاده) is an Iranian businessman.

== Business career ==
=== Esteghlal Ahvaz ===
He is the owner of Iran's Premier Football League club Esteghlal Ahvaz F.C. who he bought in 2002.

Over the years he has bought numerous players for substantial fees, including Adriano Alves, Abdul-Wahab Abu Al-Hail and Saša Ilić, and coaches such as Croatian Luka Bonačić and Serbian Srđan Gemaljević. In 2004 Shafizadeh put a $5 million unsuccessful bid to bring Brazilian superstar Rivaldo to the Takhti Stadium.

Shafizadeh sparked much controversy on February 15, 2007 when he announced Esteghlal Ahvaz F.C. were to withdraw from IPL. However, the team appeared two days later in a league match against Persepolis F.C. which ended 1-0 to Esteghlal Ahvaz, dismissing these claims and led people to believe it was all tactical games before one of the biggest games of their season versus Persepolis.

=== Esteghlal Kish ===
Shafizadeh also owned the Azadegan League club Esteghlal Kish F.C., which is based in Kish Island in the Persian Gulf, from 2002 to 2006, until it was bought by Shahrdari Bandar Abbas F.C.

== Notes ==
Business positions
Preceded by Nasrollah Heibodi	Esteghlal Ahvaz chairman 2002–	Succeeded by Incumbent
