= Sattar Doraji =

Iranian Football Forward

Personal information
- Full name: Sattar Doraji Raghireh
- Date of birth: March 25, 1993 (age 33)
- Place of birth: Ahvaz, Iran
- Position: Forward

Team information
- Current team: Naft Masjed Soleyman
- Number: 32

Youth career
- 2011–2012: Foolad
- 2012–2014: Naft Ahvaz

Senior career*
Years	Team	Apps	(Gls)
2014–2017	Naft Masjed Soleyman	48	(1)
2017–2019	Esteghlal Ahvaz	27	(5)
2019–2020	Hafari Ahvaz	1	(0)
2020–2021	Naft va Gaz Gachsaran	5	(0)
- * Club domestic league appearances and goals as of 7 July 2021

Sajjad Doraji (Persian: ستار دراجی) is an Iranian football forward who plays for Naft Masjed Soleyman in the Persian Gulf Pro League.

== Club career ==
Doraji started his career with youth academies in Ahvaz. He was part of Foolad U19 during the 2011–12 season. He also captained Naft Ahvaz U21 in the 2013–14 Iranian U21 Premier League. In summer 2014 he joined the Naft Masjed Soleyman training camp and was accepted in technical test by Majid Bagherinia. He made his debut for Naft Masjed Soleyman on 19 September 2014 against Naft Tehran as substitute for Milad Zeneyedpour.

== Club career statistics ==
As of 30 October 2014.

Club	Division	Season	League		Hazfi Cup		Asia		Total	
Club	Division	Season	Apps	Goals	Apps	Goals	Apps	Goals	Apps	Goals
Naft MIS	Pro League	2014–15	3	0	2	0	–	–	5	0
Career Totals			3	0	2	0	0	0	5	0
