= Arman Ghasemi =

Iranian footballer

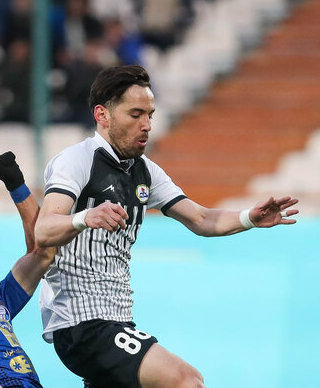

Personal information
- Full name: Arman Ghasemi
- Date of birth: August 12, 1989 (age 37)
- Place of birth: Tehran, Iran
- Height: 1.82 m (6 ft 0 in)
- Position: Left back

Team information
- Current team: Paykan
- Number: 16

Youth career
- 2001–2003: Persepolis
- 2003–2010: Paykan

Senior career*
Years	Team	Apps	(Gls)
2007–2010	Paykan	13	(0)
2010	Armin Qazvin		
2011	Hamyari Arak	12	(2)
2011	Shahrdari Arak	7	(0)
2012	Nirouye Zamini	13	(1)
2012–2013	Gahar Zagros	33	(2)
2013	Giti Pasand	8	(0)
2014	Rah Ahan	11	(0)
2014–2020	Paykan	129	(3)
2020	Naft Masjed Soleyman	2	(1)
2020–2021	Nassaji	1	(0)
2021–	Paykan	15	(4)
2021–	Zob Ahan Esfahan F.C.	33	(3)
- * Club domestic league appearances and goals

Arman Ghasemi (Persian: آرمان قاسمی; born August 12, 1989) is an Iranian football defender, who currently plays and captains for Paykan in Persian Gulf Pro League.

== Career ==
Ghasemi joined Gahar Zagros in summer 2012.

== Club Career Statistics ==
- Last Update: 7 August 2014

Club	Division	Season	League		Hazfi Cup		Asia		Total	
Club	Division	Season	Apps	Goals	Apps	Goals	Apps	Goals	Apps	Goals
Paykan	Pro League	2007–08	7	0			–			
Paykan	Pro League	2008–09	5	0			–			
Paykan	Pro League	2009–10	1	0			–			
Hamyari Arak	Division 1	2010–11	12	2			–			
Shahrdari Arak	Division 1	2011–12	7	0			–			
Nirouye Zamini	Division 1	2011–12	13	1			–			
Gahar Zagros	Pro League	2012–13	32	2	0	0	–		32	2
Giti Pasand	Division 1	2013–14	8	0	0	0	–		8	0
Rah Ahan	Pro League	2013–14	12	0	0	0	–		12	0
Paykan	Pro League	2014–15	21	0	0	0	–		21	0
Paykan	Division 1	2015–16	13	0	0	0	–		13	0
Career total			131	5			0	0	131	5
