= Amir Hossein Peiravani =

Iranian footballer and manager

Dr. Amir Hossein Peiravani
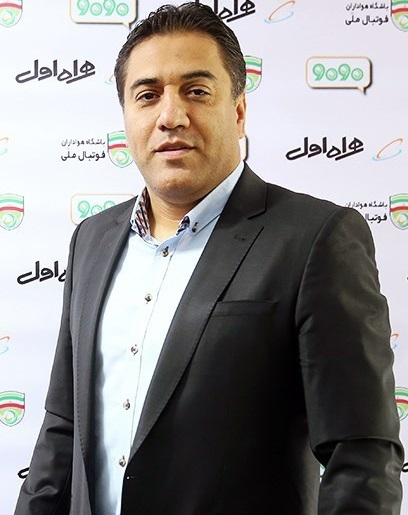

Personal information
- Full name: Amir Hossein Peiravani
- Date of birth: 16 September 1967 (age 59)
- Place of birth: Shiraz, Iran
- Height: 1.88 m (6 ft 2 in)
- Position: Forward

Youth career
- 1984–1986: Bargh Shiraz

Senior career*
Years	Team	Apps	(Gls)
1986–2000	Bargh Shiraz		

Managerial career
- 2005: Pasargad
- 2006: Sorkhpoushan
- 2007–2008: Damash Tehran
- 2008: Aboumoslem
- 2009: Saipa (assistant)
- 2010: Iran U23 (assistant)
- 2011: Gahar Zagros
- 2012: Parseh Tehran
- 2014–2017: Iran U20
- 2018: Iran U23
- 2019: Tractor (assistant)
- 2020: Iran U23 (assistant)
- 2021: Sanat Naft Abadan (assistant)
- 2022–2023: Esteghlal Khuzestan (Technical Manager)
- 2024: Mes Rafsanjan
- 2025–2026: Persepolis (assistant)
- * Club domestic league appearances and goals

Amir Hossein Peiravani (Persian: امیرحسین پیروانی born in Shiraz, Iran) is an Iranian retired footballer and manager. Currently, he is the assistant coach of Tractor Sazi. He is the brother of Iranian international footballers Gholam Peyrovani and Afshin Peyrovani.
