= Dariush Yazdi =

Iranian footballer and manager

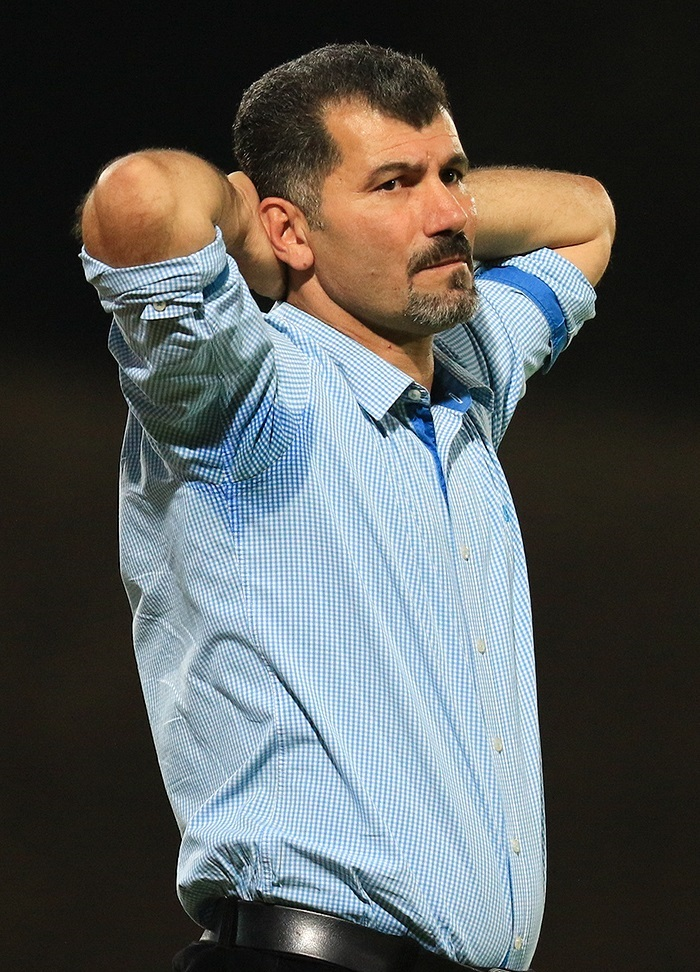

Personal information
- Full name: Dariush Yazdi
- Date of birth: September 11, 1970 (age 56)
- Place of birth: Masjed Soleyman, Iran
- Height: 1.78 m (5 ft 10 in)
- Position: Right back

Team information
- Current team: Nirooye Zamini (manager)

Senior career*
Years	Team	Apps	(Gls)
1993–1995	Esteghlal Ahvaz		
1995–1996	Esteghlal		
1996–1998	Esteghlal Ahvaz		

Managerial career
- 2004–2006: Esteghlal Ahvaz (youth)
- 2006: Esteghlal Ahvaz (assistant)
- 2007: Esteghlal Dezful
- 2009: Shahin Ahvaz
- 2010: Esteghlal Ahvaz
- 2011: Naft Masjed Soleyman
- 2012: Melli Haffari Ahvaz
- 2013: Naft Masjed Soleyman
- 2015–2016: Naft va Gaz Gachsaran
- 2016–2018: Esteghlal Khuzestan (assistant)
- 2018: Esteghlal Khuzestan
- 2020–2021: Naft Masjed Soleyman
- 2022–2024: Naft va Gaz Gachsaran
- 2025–: Nirooye Zamini
- * Club domestic league appearances and goals

Dariush Yazdi (Persian: داریوش یزدی, born 11 September 1970 in Masjed Soleyman, Khuzestan Province) is an Iranian football coach who recently managed Nirooye Zamini in the Azadegan League.
