= Mohammad Darabi =

Iranian Football Midfielder

Personal information
- Date of birth: 14 August 1992 (age 34)
- Place of birth: Yasuj, Iran
- Height: 1.78 m (5 ft 10 in)
- Position: Midfielder

Youth career
- –2013: Shahrdari Yasuj

Senior career*
Years	Team	Apps	(Gls)
2012–2014	Shahrdari Yasuj	36	(1)
2014–2015	Malavan	5	(0)
2015–2016	Naft Gachsaran	16	(3)
2016–2017	Zagros Yasouj	13	(0)
2017–2018	Shohada Babolsar	10	(0)
2019–2020	Boyer Ahmad Yasuj	7	(0)
2021–2022	Persepolis B	20	(4)
2022–2023	Biss Buru	17	(1)
2023–2024	Ettehad Boyerahmad	29	(6)
2025	Mendiola 1991	2	(0)
- * Club domestic league appearances and goals as of 26 January 2025

Mohammad Darabi (Persian: محمد دارابی; born 14 August 1992) is an Iranian professional footballer who plays as a midfielder.

== Club career ==
=== Shahrdari Yasuj ===
Darabi started his career with Shahrdari Yasuj at youth level. In summer 2012 he was promoted to the first team. In his second season, he played as a regular starter but he could not prevent his club from being relegated.

=== Malavan ===
After success in a technical test he was accepted by Nosrat Irandoost and signed a 3-year contract with Malavan. He made his debut for Malavan in the 2014–15 Iran Pro League against Tractor Sazi as a substitute for Abolhassan Jafari.

== Club career statistics ==
As of 12 September 2014.

Club	Division	Season	League		Hazfi Cup		Asia		Total	
Club	Division	Season	Apps	Goals	Apps	Goals	Apps	Goals	Apps	Goals
Shahrdari Yasuj	Division 1	2012–13	14	0	2	0	–	–	16	0
Shahrdari Yasuj	Division 1	2013–14	22	1	0	0	–	–	22	1
Malavan	Pro League	2014–15	5	0	0	0	–	–	5	0
Career Totals			41	1	2	0	0	0	43	1
