= Siavash Bakhtiarizadeh =

Iranian football manager

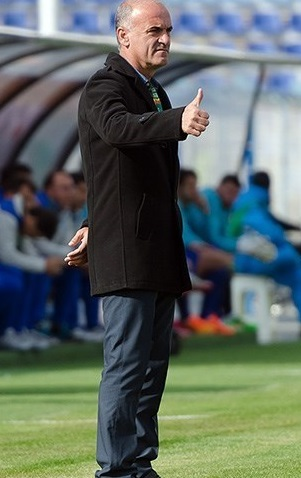

Personal information
- Date of birth: September 18, 1961 (age 65)
- Place of birth: Haftgel, Iran

Senior career*
| Years | Team | Apps | (Gls) |
| 1986–1990 | Shahin Ahvaz | 9 | (1) |
| 1990–1997 | Jonoob Ahvaz | 79 | (14) |
| 1997–1999 | Foolad | 28 | (1) |
| 1999–2000 | Shahin Ahvaz | | |

Managerial career
- 2000–2001: Esteghlal Ahvaz
- 2011: Naft Masjed Soleyman
- 2015: Esteghlal Ahvaz
- 2015–2016: Esteghlal Ahvaz
- 2015–2016: Esteghlal Ahvaz
- 2018: Esteghlal Ahvaz
- 2018–2019: Esteghlal Ahvaz (team manager)
- 2024–2025: Foolad (academy manager)
- 2025: Iran U17
- * Club domestic league appearances and goals

Siavash Bakhtiarizadeh (Persian: سیاوش بختیاری‌زاده, born 18 October 1961) is an Iranian football manager. Sohrab Bakhtiarizadeh is his cousin. Kourosh and Darush Bakhtiarizadeh are also his brothers Darush has been retired and Kourosh was coach of Foolad for years.
