= Mehrdad Hedayatian =

Iranian footballer

Personal information
- Date of birth: 2 November 1997 (age 29)
- Place of birth: Ahvaz, Iran
- Height: 1.83 m (6 ft 0 in)
- Position: Winger

Team information
- Current team: Sanat Naft
- Number: 9

Youth career
- –2017: Foolad

Senior career*
| Years | Team | Apps | (Gls) |
| 2017–2020 | Foolad | 16 | (0) |
| 2020–2021 | Pars Jonoubi | 27 | (2) |
| 2021–2022 | Naft Masjed Soleyman | 13 | (0) |
| 2022–2023 | Kheybar | 17 | (0) |
| 2023–2024 | Bandar Abbas | 19 | (6) |
| 2024– | Sanat Naft | 8 | (0) |
- * Club domestic league appearances and goals as of 21 April 2025

Mehrdad Hedayatian (Persian: مهرداد هراتیان, born 2 November 1997) is an Iranian footballer who plays as a winger for Sanat Naft in the Azadegan League.

== Club career ==
=== Foolad ===
He made his debut for Foolad in 2nd fixtures of 2017–18 Iran Pro League against Naft Tehran.
