= Soheil Asgharzad =

Iranian football midfielder

Personal information
- Full name: Soheil Asgharzad Fayyaz
- Date of birth: 13 January 1993 (age 33)
- Place of birth: Anzali, Iran
- Position: Midfielder

Team information
- Current team: Esteghlal
- Number: 18

Youth career
- 2010–2013: Malavan

Senior career*
Years	Team	Apps	(Gls)
2013–2014	Gahar Doroud	10	(0)
2014–2015	Esteghlal	0	(0)
- * Club domestic league appearances and goals as of 5 July 2014 (UTC)

Soheil Asgharzad Fayyaz (Persian: سهیل اصغرزاد فیاض, born 13 January 1993 in Anzali, Iran) is an Iranian football midfielder, who currently plays for Esteghlal in Iran's Premier League football.
