= Mehdi Niyayesh Pour =

Iranian footballer

Personal information
- Full name: Mehdi Niyayesh Pour
- Date of birth: 25 January 1992 (age 34)
- Place of birth: Ahvaz, Iran
- Height: 1.85 m (6 ft 1 in)
- Position: Striker

Team information
- Current team: Naft MIS
- Number: 80

Youth career
- 2008–2011: Esteghlal Ahvaz
- 2011–2013: Foolad

Senior career*
Years	Team	Apps	(Gls)
2010–2011	Esteghlal Ahvaz	9	(1)
2012–2015	Foolad	1	(0)
2015	Foolad B	10	(5)
2016–	Esteghlal Ahvaz	0	(0)
- * Club domestic league appearances and goals

Mehdi Niyayesh Pour (born 25 January 1992) is an Iranian footballer, currently playing in Naft Masjed Soleyman. He plays as a striker, but can also play as a right winger.

Mehdi Nayeshpour is considered the best scorer in the history of the Under-21 Premier League in 2013. He scored 25 goals in 16 games in the Under-21 Premier League. Managed to move the record for 16 years and reach an unreachable record, and this record is still lasting.
