= Mohammad Razipour =

Iranian footballer

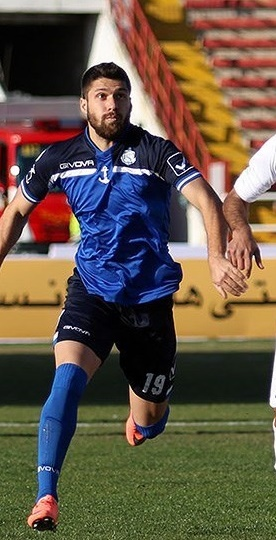

Personal information
- Date of birth: 18 September 1993 (age 33)
- Place of birth: Babol, Iran
- Height: 1.74 m (5 ft 8 1/2 in)
- Position: Winger

Youth career
- 2011–2014: Malavan

Senior career*
| Years | Team | Apps | (Gls) |
| 2014–2016 | Malavan | 23 | (0) |
| 2019–2020 | Shohada Babolsar | | |
| 2020–2022 | Rayka Babol | 21 | (3) |
| 2022–2023 | Darya Caspian | 9 | (1) |
- * Club domestic league appearances and goals

Mohammad Razipour (Persian: محمد رضی‌پور; born 18 September 1993) is an Iranian former football player.

== Club career ==
=== Malavan ===
Razipour started his career with Malavan youth levels. He was promoted to te first team by Nosrat Irandoost in the summer of 2014. He made his debut for Malavan in 2014–15 Iran Pro League against Zob Ahan as a substitute for Mohsen Yousefi.

== Club career statistics ==
As of 15 May 2015.

| Club | Division | Season | League | | Hazfi Cup | | Asia | | Total | |
| Club | Division | Season | Apps | Goals | Apps | Goals | Apps | Goals | Apps | Goals |
|---|---|---|---|---|---|---|---|---|---|---|
| Malavan | Pro League | 2014–15 | 4 | 0 | 0 | 0 | – | – | 4 | 0 |
| Career Totals | | | 4 | 0 | 0 | 0 | 0 | 0 | 4 | 0 |
