= Ali Abedi =

Iranian footballer

Personal information
- Date of birth: 19 February 1995 (age 31)
- Place of birth: Shiraz, Iran
- Height: 1.78 m (5 ft 10 in)
- Positions: Attacking midfielder; striker

Team information
- Current team: Shahrdari Bandar Anzali

Youth career
- 2007–2015: Malavan

Senior career*
Years	Team	Apps	(Gls)
2014–2016	Malavan	4	(0)
2016–2017	Shahin Bandar Anzali		
2017–2019	Malavan	11	(0)
2019–	Shahrdari Bandar Anzali		
- * Club domestic league appearances and goals as of 30 April 2019

Ali Abedi (Persian: علی عابدی; born 19 February 1995) is an Iranian football player who plays for Shahrdari Bandar Anzali.

== Club career ==
=== Malavan ===
He started his career with Malavan youth levels. He was promoted to first team by Nosrat Irandoost in summer 2014. He made his debut for Malavan in 2014–15 Iran Pro League against Sepahan as a substitute for Reza Etemadi.

== Club career statistics ==
As of 19 September 2014.

Club	Division	Season	League		Cup		Asia		Total	
Club	Division	Season	Apps	Goals	Apps	Goals	Apps	Goals	Apps	Goals
Malavan	Pro League	2014–15	2	1	0	0	–	–	2	1
Persekap	Divisi utama	2015_16	3	0	0	0	_	_	3	0
Career Totals			2	0	0	0	0	0	2	0
