= Mohammad Hossein Akbar Monadi =

Iranian footballer

Hossein Monadi
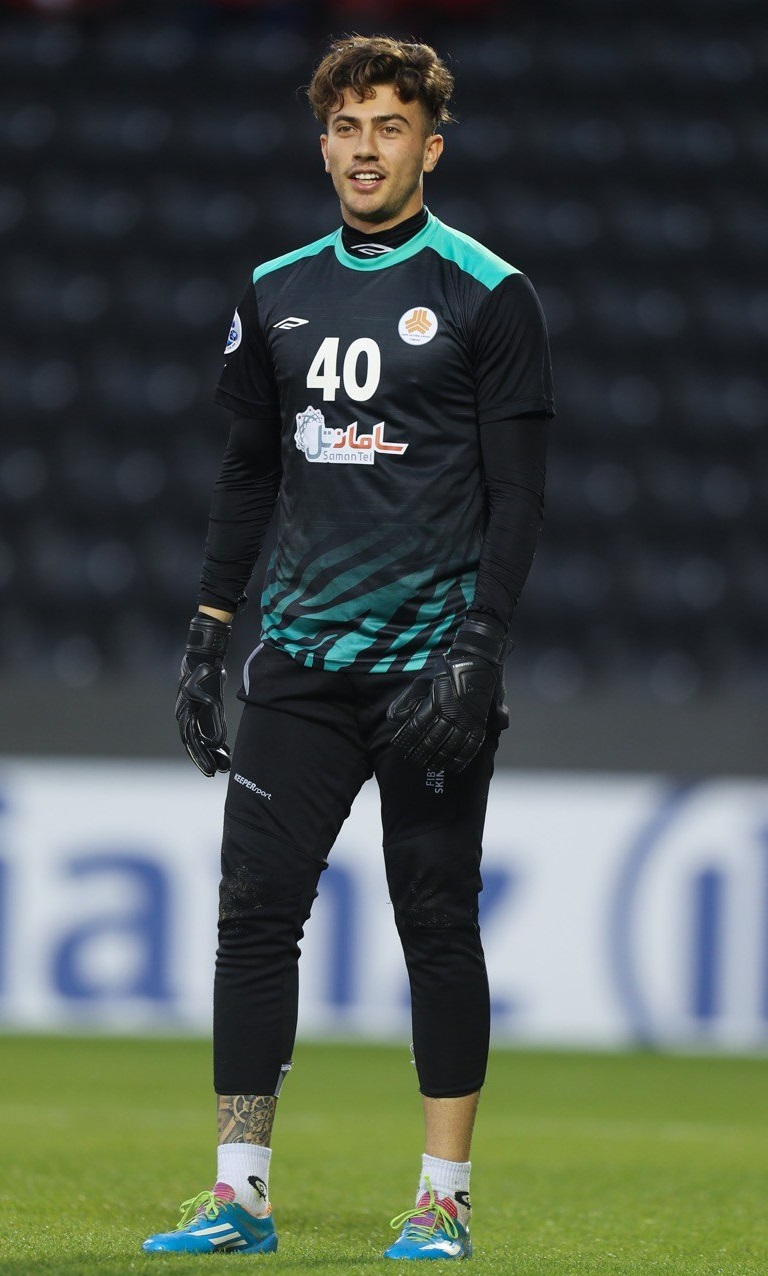

Personal information
- Full name: Mohammad Hossein Akbar Monadi
- Date of birth: 31 January 1996 (age 30)
- Place of birth: Dorud, Iran
- Height: 1.88 m (6 ft 2 in)
- Position: Goalkeeper

Youth career
- 2001–2013: Gahar

Senior career*
| Years | Team | Apps | (Gls) |
| 2013–2014 | Gahar | 6 | (0) |
| 2014–2019 | Saipa | 13 | (0) |
| 2019–2020 | Shahr Khodro | 0 | (0) |
| 2020–2021 | Saipa | 32 | (0) |
| 2021–2023 | Gol Gohar | 11 | (0) |
| 2023–2024 | Malavan | 4 | (0) |
| 2024–2025 | Havadar | 8 | (0) |
- * Club domestic league appearances and goals as of 1 May 2025

Mohammad Hossein Akbar Monadi (Persian: محمدحسین اکبرمنادی; born 31 January 1996) is an Iranian footballer who plays as a goalkeeper for Havadar in the Persian Gulf Pro League.
