= Vahdat Qom F.C. =

Iranian football club

Vahdat Qom وحدت قم
- Full name: Vahdat Qom Football Club
- Founded: 2014
- Ground: Shahid Heydarian Stadium, Qom
- Capacity: 3,000
- League: 3rd Division
- 2014–15: 2nd Division Group B, 9th (relegated)
Home colours	Away colours

Vahdat Qom Football Club (Persian: باشگاه فوتبال وحدت قم) is an Iranian football team based in Qom, Iran and currently plays in the 2nd Division.

== Players ==
=== First-team squad ===
Note: Flags indicate national team as defined under FIFA eligibility rules; some limited exceptions apply. Players may hold more than one non-FIFA nationality.

No.	Pos.	Nation	Player
1	GK	IRN	Hamid Reza Nazifi
5	DF	IRN	Mojtaba Mobini Pour
7	MF	IRN	Amir Mollajamali
8	MF	IRN	Mohammad Arab Khorasani
9	FW	IRN	Hamid Reza Pakizeh
10	FW	IRN	Alireza Ostovari (Captain)
11	FW	IRN	Yaser Karami
13	FW	IRN	Mohammad Rasouli

No.	Pos.	Nation	Player
—	MF	IRN	Habibollah Saadati
—	DF	IRN	Osameh Kavianpour
—	DF	IRN	Mohsen Yazdi
—	DF	IRN	Ali Bakhtiari
40	GK	IRN	Mohammad Reza Vafaei

== Season-by-Season ==
The table below shows the achievements of the club in various competitions.

Season	League	Position	Hazfi Cup	Notes
2014–15	2nd Division		Fourth Round

== See also ==
- 2014–15 Iran Football's 2nd Division
