= Yazdan Abbasian =

Iranian footballer

Personal information
- Full name: Yazdan Abbasian
- Date of birth: 11 May 1992 (age 34)
- Place of birth: Sarpol-e Zahab, Iran
- Position: Forward

Team information
- Current team: Shahrdari Bandar Abbas

Youth career
- Gahar Zagros

Senior career*
| Years | Team | Apps | (Gls) |
| 2012–2014 | Gahar Zagros | 20 | (2) |
| 2014–2015 | Esteghlal Khuzestan | 15 | (1) |
| 2015–2016 | Giti Pasand | | (6) |
| 2017 | Shahin Bushehr F.C | | |
| 2017–2018 | Shahrdari Bandar Abbas | 25 | (18) |
| 2018–2019 | Malavan F.C. | | (1) |
| 2019–2020 | Mes Shahr-e Babak F.C. | 6 | (2) |
| 2020- | Navad Urmia F.C. | 4 | (1) |
- * Club domestic league appearances and goals

Yazdan Abbasian is an Iranian midfielder who currently plays for Iranian football club Shahrdari Bandar Abbas in the League 2 Iran.
