= Srđan Gemaljević =

Serbian footballer and coach

Personal information
- Date of birth: 20 July 1960 (age 66)

Team information
- Current team: SW Bregenz (asst coach)

Senior career*
Years	Team	Apps	(Gls)
- Red Star Belgrade
1982–1983	OFK Beograd		
1987-1988	Türkgücü München	27	(1)
1988–1994	FC Memmingen	156	(16)

Managerial career
- 1995–1996: ASV Fellheim
- 1996–1997: SW Bregenz (assistant)
- 1997–2000: SW Bregenz
- 2000–2001: FR Yugoslavia (assistant)
- 2002–2003: FC Lustenau 07
- 2004-2005: Esteghlal (assistant)
- 2005–2006: Esteghlal Ahvaz
- 2010: PAS Hamedan (assistant)
- 2011: Pirouzi (assistant)
- 2017–2018: SpVgg Lindau
- 2020–2023: SW Bregenz (assistant)
- 2023–2024: SW Bregenz
- 2024–: SW Bregenz (assistant)
- * Club domestic league appearances and goals

Srđan Gemaljević (Serbian Cyrillic: Срђан Гемаљевић; born 20 July 1960) is a Serbian football coach and former player. He is assistant coach at Schwarz-Weiß Bregenz.
