= Mohammadreza Ghodratipour =

Iranian footballer

Mohammadreza Ghodraipour
Personal information
- Full name: Mohammadreza Ghodratipour
- Date of birth: April 13, 1994 (age 32)
- Place of birth: Isfahan, Iran
- Position: Goalkeeper

Team information
- Current team: Saba Qom
- Number: 40

Youth career
- 2002–2006: Iran Sport Isfahan
- 2006–2012: Sepahan
- 2012–2013: Foolad Yazd
- 2013–2014: Rah Ahan
- 2014–: Saba Qom

Senior career*
Years	Team	Apps	(Gls)
2012–2013	Foolad Yazd	0	(0)
2013–2014	Rah Ahan	1	(0)
2014–	Saba Qom	0	(0)

International career^{‡}
2009–2011	Iran U17		
2011–2012	Iran U20		
- * Club domestic league appearances and goals as of 31 July 2014 ‡ National team caps and goals as of 15 January 2014

Mohammadreza Ghodratipour (Persian: محمدرضا قدرتی‌پور) is an Iranian football goalkeeper who plays for Saba Qom in the Iran Pro League.

== Club career ==
=== Early years ===
He started his career with Iran Sport Isfahan when he was 8. After 4 years he joined Sepahan Academy. He is part of Sepahan Academy until 2012.

=== Foolad Yazd ===
He joined Foolad Yazd in summer 2012. He is also part of Foolad Yazd U21 however he failed to play a single match for Foolad Yazd first team.

=== Rah Ahan ===
After a season in Yazd, he joined Rah Ahan U21 and helped them to reach 4th place in the 2013–14 Tehran U21 League. After a successful season with Rah Ahan U21 he was promoted to first team by club coach Mansour Ebrahimzadeh. He was given #2 and made his debut in a 1–0 loss against Zob Ahan in the 2013–14 Iran Pro League final fixture.

=== Saba ===
He joined Saba Qom in summer 2014. He signed a three-year contract and was given the number 40.

== Club career statistics ==
As of 31 July 2014.

Club	Division	Season	League		Hazfi Cup		Asia		Total	
Club	Division	Season	Apps	Goals	Apps	Goals	Apps	Goals	Apps	Goals
Foolad Yazd	Division 1	2012–13	0	0	0	0	–	–	0	0
Rah Ahan	Pro League	2013–14	1	0	0	0	–	–	1	0
Saba Qom	Pro League	2014–15	0	0	0	0	–	–	0	0
Career Totals			1	0	0	0	0	0	1	0

== International career ==
=== U17 ===
He is part of Iran U-17 from 2009 until 2011.

=== U20 ===
He is part of Iran U-20 during 2011 & 2012.

=== U23 ===
He invited to Iran U-23 training camp by Nelo Vingada.
