= Hamdollah Ebdam =

Iranian Football Midfielder

Personal information
- Date of birth: 21 March 1993 (age 33)
- Place of birth: Baghmalek, Iran
- Height: 1.74 m (5 ft 9 in)
- Position: Midfielder

Team information
- Current team: Nika Pars Chaloos
- Number: 14

Youth career
- –2014: Esteghlal Khuzestan

Senior career*
Years	Team	Apps	(Gls)
2014–2016	Esteghlal Khuzestan	15	(0)
2016–2017	Esteghlal Ahvaz	24	(2)
2017–2018	Iranjavan	18	(0)
2018–2020	Nirooye Zamini	27	(3)
2020–2021	Kheybar Khorramabad	13	(1)
2021–2022	Vista Turbine	11	(0)
2022–2023	Mes Shahr-e Babak	27	(4)
2023–2024	Pars Jonoubi Jam	19	(3)
2024–	Nika Pars Chaloos	1	(0)
- * Club domestic league appearances and goals as of 11 November 2024

Hamdollah Ebdam (Persian: حمدالله ابدام; born 21 March 1993) is an Iranian football midfielder who plays for Nika Pars Chaloos in the League 2.

== Club career ==
Rabbani started his career with Esteghlal Khuzestan from youth levels. He was promoted to the first team in summer 2014 while he signed a three-year contract. He made his debut for Esteghlal Khuzestan on November 7, 2014, against Saipa as a starter.

== Club career statistics ==
As of 12 December 2014.

Club	Division	Season	League		Hazfi Cup		Asia		Total	
Club	Division	Season	Apps	Goals	Apps	Goals	Apps	Goals	Apps	Goals
Esteghlal Kh.	Pro League	2014–15	2	0	1	0	–	–	2	0
Career Totals			2	0	1	0	0	0	3	0

== Honours ==
Esteghlal Khuzestan

- Iran Pro League (1): 2015–16
- Iranian Super Cup runner-up: 2016
