= Bagher Hashemi =

Iranian footballer

Personal information
- Date of birth: 2 April 1994 (age 32)
- Place of birth: Ahvaz, Iran
- Height: 1.77 m (5 ft 10 in)
- Position: Right back

Youth career
- –2014: Esteghlal Khuzestan

Senior career*
Years	Team	Apps	(Gls)
2014–2017	Esteghlal Khuzestan	9	(0)
2017–2018	Foolad Khuzestan B		
2018–2019	Esteghlal Mollasani		
- * Club domestic league appearances and goals

Bagher Hashemi (Persian: باقر هاشمی; born 2 April 1994) is an Iranian former football defender.

== Club career ==
Rabbani started his career with Esteghlal Khuzestan from youth levels. He promoted to the first team in summer 2014 while he signed a 3-year contract. He made his debut for Esteghlal Khuzestan on August 15, 2014, against Naft Tehran as a starter.

== Club career statistics ==
As of 12 December 2014.

Club	Division	Season	League		Hazfi Cup		Asia		Total	
Club	Division	Season	Apps	Goals	Apps	Goals	Apps	Goals	Apps	Goals
Esteghlal Kh.	Pro League	2014–15	3	0	1	0	–	–	4	0
Career Totals			3	0	1	0	0	0	4	0

== Honours ==
Esteghlal Khuzestan

- Iran Pro League (1): 2015–16
- Iranian Super Cup runner-up: 2016
