= Lamine Diawara (footballer) =

Malian footballer (born 1986)

Personal information
- Date of birth: 18 May 1986 (age 40)
- Place of birth: Mali
- Position: Midfielder

Senior career*
Years	Team	Apps	(Gls)
2009–2014	Stade Malien	21	(2)
2014–2015	Esteghlal Khuzestan	17	(2)
2015–2017	Al-Nasr		
2017	Renaissance du Congo		

International career
2013–2014	Mali	23	(7)
- * Club domestic league appearances and goals

Lamine Diawara (born 18 May 1986) is a Malian former professional footballer who played as a midfielder.

== International career ==
In January 2014, coach Djibril Dramé, invited him to be a part of the Mali squad for the 2014 African Nations Championship. He helped the team to the quarter finals where they lost to Zimbabwe by two goals to one.
