= Mahyar Zahmatkesh =

Iranian footballer

Personal information
- Date of birth: 6 June 1993 (age 33)
- Place of birth: Bandar-e Anzali, Iran
- Height: 1.81 m (5 ft 11 in)
- Position: Defensive midfielder

Team information
- Current team: Malavan
- Number: 26

Youth career
- 2004–2014: Malavan

Senior career*
Years	Team	Apps	(Gls)
2014–2021	Malavan	131	(13)
2021–2022	Mes Kerman	22	(5)
2022–2023	Shams Azar	3	(0)
2023	Mes Kerman	5	(0)
2023–2025	Saipa	49	(3)
2025–	Malavan	6	(0)
- * Club domestic league appearances and goals as of 22 April 2025

Mahyar Zahmatkesh (Persian: مهیار زحمتکش; born 6 June 1993) is an Iranian football midfielder who plays for Malavan in the Persian Gulf Pro League.

== Club career ==
=== Malavan ===
He started his career with Malavan youth levels when he was 11. He was promoted to the first team by Farhad Pourgholami. Zahmatkesh signed a professional contract in June 2014 which keeps him until summer 2016 at Malavan. He made his debut for Malavan in the 2014–15 Iran Pro League against Saba Qom as a substitute for Maziar Zare.

== Club career statistics ==
As of 10 January 2016.

Club	Division	Season	League		Hazfi Cup		Asia		Total	
Club	Division	Season	Apps	Goals	Apps	Goals	Apps	Goals	Apps	Goals
Malavan	Pro League	2014–15	12	0	1	0	–	–	13	0
Malavan	Pro League	2015–16	1	0	0	0	–	–	1	0
Career totals			13	0	1	0	–	–	14	0
