= Milad Nouri (footballer, born 1993) =

Iranian footballer

Personal information
- Full name: Milad Nouri Dijojin
- Date of birth: July 6, 1993 (age 33)
- Place of birth: Iran
- Position: Midfielder

Team information
- Current team: Saba Qom
- Number: 24

Youth career
- 2009–2011: Persepolis
- 2011–2013: Moghavemat Tehran
- 2013–2014: Naft Tehran

Senior career*
Years	Team	Apps	(Gls)
2013–2014	Naft Tehran	3	(0)
2014–	Saba Qom	0	(0)
- * Club domestic league appearances and goals as of 8 August 2014

Milad Nouri Dijojin is an Iranian football midfielder who currently plays for the Iranian football club Saba Qom in the Iran Pro League.
