= Milad Rabbani =

Iranian football defender (born 1993)

Personal information
- Full name: Milad Rabbani Fard
- Date of birth: January 26, 1993 (age 33)
- Place of birth: Dezful, Iran
- Position: Defender

Team information
- Current team: Esteghlal Ahvaz
- Number: 25

Youth career
- 2008–2013: Esteghlal Ahvaz
- 2013–2014: Nirooye Zamini

Senior career*
Years	Team	Apps	(Gls)
2011–2013	Esteghlal Ahvaz	23	(0)
2013–2014	Nirooye Zamini	5	(0)
2014–2015	Esteghlal Khuzestan	1	(0)
2016–	Esteghlal Ahvaz	0	(0)
- * Club domestic league appearances and goals as of 31 October 2014

Milad Rabbani (Persian: میلاد ربانی) is an Iranian football defender who currently plays for Iranian football club Esteghlal Ahvaz in the Iran Pro League.

== Club career ==
Rabbani started his career with Esteghlal Ahvaz from youth levels. He was promoted to the first team after relegation to Division 2 in 2011. He was a regular starter in his first season with Esteghlal Ahvaz while he helped them gain promotion to Division 1. In summer 2014, he joined Esteghlal Khuzestan with a 3-year contract. He made his debut for Esteghlal Khuzestan on 31 October 2014 against Sepahan as a starter.

== Club career statistics ==
As of 31 October 2014.

Club	Division	Season	League		Hazfi Cup		Asia		Total	
Club	Division	Season	Apps	Goals	Apps	Goals	Apps	Goals	Apps	Goals
Esteghlal Ahvaz	Division 2	2011–12	11	0	0	0	–	–	11	0
Esteghlal Ahvaz	Division 1	2012–13	12	0	0	0	–	–	12	0
Nirouye Zamini	Division 1	2013–14	5	0	–	–	–	–	5	0
Esteghlal Kh.	Pro League	2014–15	1	0	0	0	–	–	1	0
Esteghlal Ahvaz	Pro League	2015–16	0	0	0	0	–	–	0	0
Career Totals			29	0	0	0	0	0	29	0
