= Mohammad Ali Safia =

Iranian footballer (born 1997)

Personal information
- Full name: Mohammad Ali Safia
- Date of birth: February 12, 1997 (age 29)
- Place of birth: Khuzestan, Iran
- Height: 1.77 m (5 ft 10 in)
- Position: Winger

Team information
- Current team: Kheybar Khorramabad
- Number: 9

Youth career
- 2015–2018: Esteghlal
- 2016–2018: → Nirooye Zamini (loan)

Senior career*
Years	Team	Apps	(Gls)
2018–2019	Naft Gachsaran	8	(1)
2019–2020	Sorkhpooshan	0	(0)
2020	Naft Masjed Soleyman	3	(0)
2020–2021	Mes Kerman	28	(2)
2021–	Kheybar Khorramabad	2	(0)

International career^{‡}
2014	Iran U17	1	(0)
2019–2020	Iran U23	0	(0)
- * Club domestic league appearances and goals as of 30 September 2021 ‡ National team caps and goals as of 30 September 2021

Mohammad Ali Safia (Persian: محمدعلی صفیا; born February 12, 1997) is an Iranian footballer who plays as a winger for Iranian club Kheybar Khorramabad in the Azadegan League.

== Club career ==
=== Club Career Statistics ===
- Last Update: 11 November 2021

Club performance			League		Cup		Continental		Total	
Season	Club	League	Apps	Goals	Apps	Goals	Apps	Goals	Apps	Goals
Iran			League		Hazfi Cup		Asia		Total	
2017–18	Naft Masjed Soleyman	Persian Gulf Pro League	3	0	0	0	–	–	3	0
2020–21	Mes Kerman	Azadegan League	28	2	2	1	–	–	30	3
2021–22	Kheybar Khorramabad	Azadegan League	2	0	0	0	–	–	2	0
Career total			33	2	2	1	0	0	35	3
