= Milad Abtahi =

Iranian footballer

Personal information
- Date of birth: 8 January 1992 (age 34)
- Place of birth: Tehran, Iran
- Height: 1.75 m (5 ft 9 in)
- Position: Midfielder

Team information
- Current team: Iranjavan
- Number: 26

Youth career
- Paykan

Senior career*
| Years | Team | Apps | (Gls) |
| 2010–2014 | Paykan | 10 | (0) |
| 2014–2016 | Rah Ahan | 32 | (0) |
| 2016–2017 | Saba Qom | 14 | (0) |
| 2017–2019 | Khooneh Be Khooneh | 19 | (0) |
| 2019 | Mes Rafsanjan | 10 | (0) |
| 2019–2021 | Gol Reyhan Alborz | 10 | (0) |
| 2021–2022 | Vista Turbin | 18 | (0) |
| 2022–2023 | Sorkhpooshan Novin Pakdasht | | |
| 2023–2024 | Darya Caspian | 33 | (2) |
| 2024– | Iranjavan | | |
- * Club domestic league appearances and goals as of 9 April 2015

Milad Abtahi (Persian: میلاد ابطحی; born 8 January 1992) is an Iranian football forward who plays for Iranjavan in League 2.
