= Soumbeïla Diakité =

Malian footballer (born 1984)

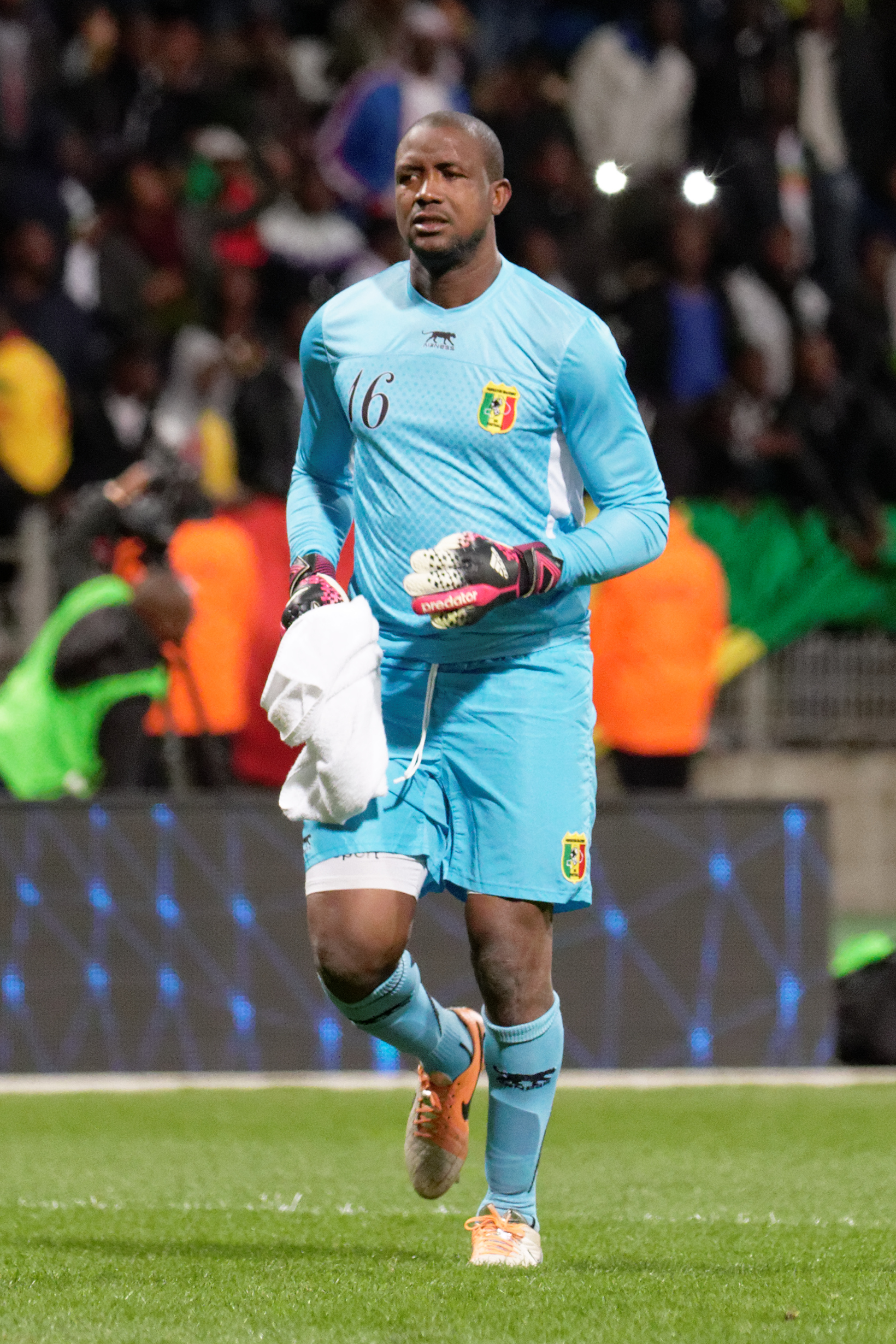
- Diakité with Mali in 2015

Personal information
- Date of birth: 25 August 1984 (age 42)
- Place of birth: Bamako, Mali
- Height: 1.85 m (6 ft 1 in)
- Position: Goalkeeper

Senior career*
Years	Team	Apps	(Gls)
2003–2014	Stade Malien		
2014–2015	Esteghlal Khuzestan	8	(0)
2015–2018	Stade Malien		

International career
2006–2017	Mali	47	(0)
- * Club domestic league appearances and goals

Soumbeïla Diakité (born 25 August 1984) is a Malian former professional footballer who played as a goalkeeper.

== International career ==
Diakité was part of the Mali U-20 team which finished third in group stage of 2003 FIFA World Youth Championship. He was part of the Malian 2004 Olympic team which exited in the quarter finals, finishing top of group A, but losing to Italy in the next round.

== Career statistics ==
Appearances and goals by national team and year
National team	Year	Apps	Goals
Mali	2006	3	0
Mali	2007	1	0
Mali	2008	3	0
Mali	2009	3	0
Mali	2010	3	0
Mali	2011	6	0
Mali	2012	7	0
Mali	2013	7	0
Mali	2014	7	0
Mali	2015	7	0
Total		47	0
