= Majid Bagherinia =

Iranian football manager

Abdul Majid Bagherinia
Personal information
- Date of birth: November 13, 1959 (age 66)
- Place of birth: Ahvaz, Iran

Managerial career
- Years: Team
- 2004–2007: Naft Masjed Soleyman (youth)
- 2007–2008: Naft Masjed Soleyman (assistant)
- 2008–2010: Naft Masjed Soleyman
- 2010–2011: Foolad Yazd
- 2011–2013: Esteghlal Khuzestan
- 2014: Naft Masjed Soleyman (caretaker)
- 2014–2016: Shahrdari Bandar Abbas
- 2016: Foolad Yazd
- 2016–2017: Shahrdari Mahshahr

Majid Bagherinia (Persian: مجید باقری نیا, born 13 November 1959) is an Iranian football manager and the current head coach of Shahrdari Mahshahr.

== Honors ==
=== As a manager ===
Shahin Ahvaz F.C.

- Hazfi Cup:

Winners (1): 1988
