= Esteghlal Ahvaz F.C. =

Association football club in Iran

Esteghlal Ahvaz استقلال اهواز
- Full name: Esteghlal Ahvaz Football Club
- Founded: 1948; 78 years ago (as Taj Ahvaz Football Club)
- Ground: Takhti Ahvaz
- Capacity: 10,000
- Owner: Mohammad Maleki
- Chairman: Farshid Faraji
- Head Coach: Ali Khoshzhat
- League: League 3
- 2019–20: League 3, Disqualified (relegated)
- Website: www.esteghlalahwazfc.ir
Home colours	Away colours

Esteghlal Ahvaz Football Club (Persian: باشگاه فوتبال استقلال اهواز, Bashgah-e Futbal-e Esteqlâl Ahvaz), commonly known as Esteghlal Ahvaz, is an Iranian football club based in Ahvaz, Khuzestan, that competed in the Khuzestan Province league. The club was founded in 1948 as Taj Ahvaz Football Club (Persian: باشگاه فوتبال تاج اهواز).

The football team played their home games at the Takhti Ahvaz which has a seating capacity of 10,000. The club was owned and supported by Mohammad Maleki.

== History ==
=== Establishment ===
The club was founded as Taj Ahvaz Football Club by Hakim Shoushtari in 1938. The club was one of Taj Tehran branches at the time.

=== Before 1970 ===
Before the 1970s, Iran did not have an official national football league. Most clubs participated in championships of their city or province. In addition to that Taj Ahvaz played in the Khuzestan Premier League until 1970.

=== 1970s ===
In 1970, the Local League was created. The league included teams from all Iran in different qualifying tournaments. Taj Ahvaz finished first in Group A of their qualifying tournament. After losing the semifinal, Taj Ahvaz defeated Javanan Isfahan 2–0 in the third-place match.

The club also participated in the 1971–72 Local League season. Taj Ahvaz missed again qualification for the final stage after defeating 0–2 by Sepahan in the semifinal of their qualifying tournament. Once again, they achieved third place after a 2–1 win over Tractor.

In 1972, the Takht Jamshid Cup was founded as the national league and included teams from all over the country. Although Taj Ahvaz was promoted to the Takht Jamshid Cup in 1973, the club had to play in the Khuzestan Premier League anymore. Reason therefore was rule by the Iran Football Federation. They allowed only one team of the same name to participate in the league at that time. Taj Tehran played in the league already.

=== 1979 Revolution ===
After the Islamic Revolution in Iran, Taj Ahvaz changed its name into Esteghlal Ahvaz Football Club. Esteghlal means independence in Persian. After the revolution, any sign of the previous monarchist regime was not tolerated.

=== 1980s and 1990s ===
Due to the Iranian Revolution and the Iran–Iraq War, the Takht Jamshid Cup was dissolved and also the lower leagues were unorganized. The war hit Ahvaz and Khuzestan hard. Consequently, the people paid very little attention to the club and football in general at that time. In 1989 the Qods League was created as the national football league, but Esteghlal Ahvaz did not participate.

In 1991 the Azadegan League was formed as the top flight of Iranian football. Esteghlal Ahvaz played for eight years in the league with average results. After they finished 13th in the 1997–98 Azadegan League season, Esteghlal Ahvaz relegated to Iran Football's 2nd Division.

=== 2000s ===
After the Iran Pro League was established as the professional football league of Iran, Azadegan League was declared as the second-highest professional league in the Iranian football league system. Esteghlal Ahvaz won the 2001–02 Azadegan League season and promoted to Iran Pro League.

Esteghlal Ahvaz had a good team and remained in Iran pro League. They finished eighth in the 2003–04 Iran Pro League season and fifth one season later.

After they achieved only 12th place in 2005–06 Iran Pro League, Esteghlal Ahvaz finished as runners-up in the 2006–07 season. They continued to be an average team in seasons 2007–08 and 2008–09.

=== Weak years ===
Based on a weak performance during 2009–10 Iran Pro League, Esteghlal Ahvaz finished 18th and relegated to Azadegan League. Only one year later they relegated again due to a lot of instability in 2010–11 Azadegan League as they finished 13th. Esteghlal Ahvaz returned to Azadegan League in 2012. They won the 2011–12 Iran 2nd Division after a 4–3 win over PAS Novin Hamedan.

Past on two average seasons, Esteghlal Ahvaz relegated again to League 2. They lost their Play-off match against Shahrdari Tabriz 3–3 on aggregate due to away goals.

=== Promotion and relegation ===
Although Esteghlal Ahvaz was relegated to League 2 in 2014-15 season, they were able to play in the 2015–16 Persian Gulf Pro League. They got the licence from Foolad Novin, which was actually promoted. Foolad Novin could not be promoted to Persian Gulf Pro League, being the reserve side of Foolad Khuzestan. However the team was mismanaged and they were relegated back to the Azadegan League several games before the end of the season.

Because of a very poor performance in the 2016–17 Azadegan League season, Esteghlal Ahvaz was relegated to League 2 without winning a single match.

== Stadium ==
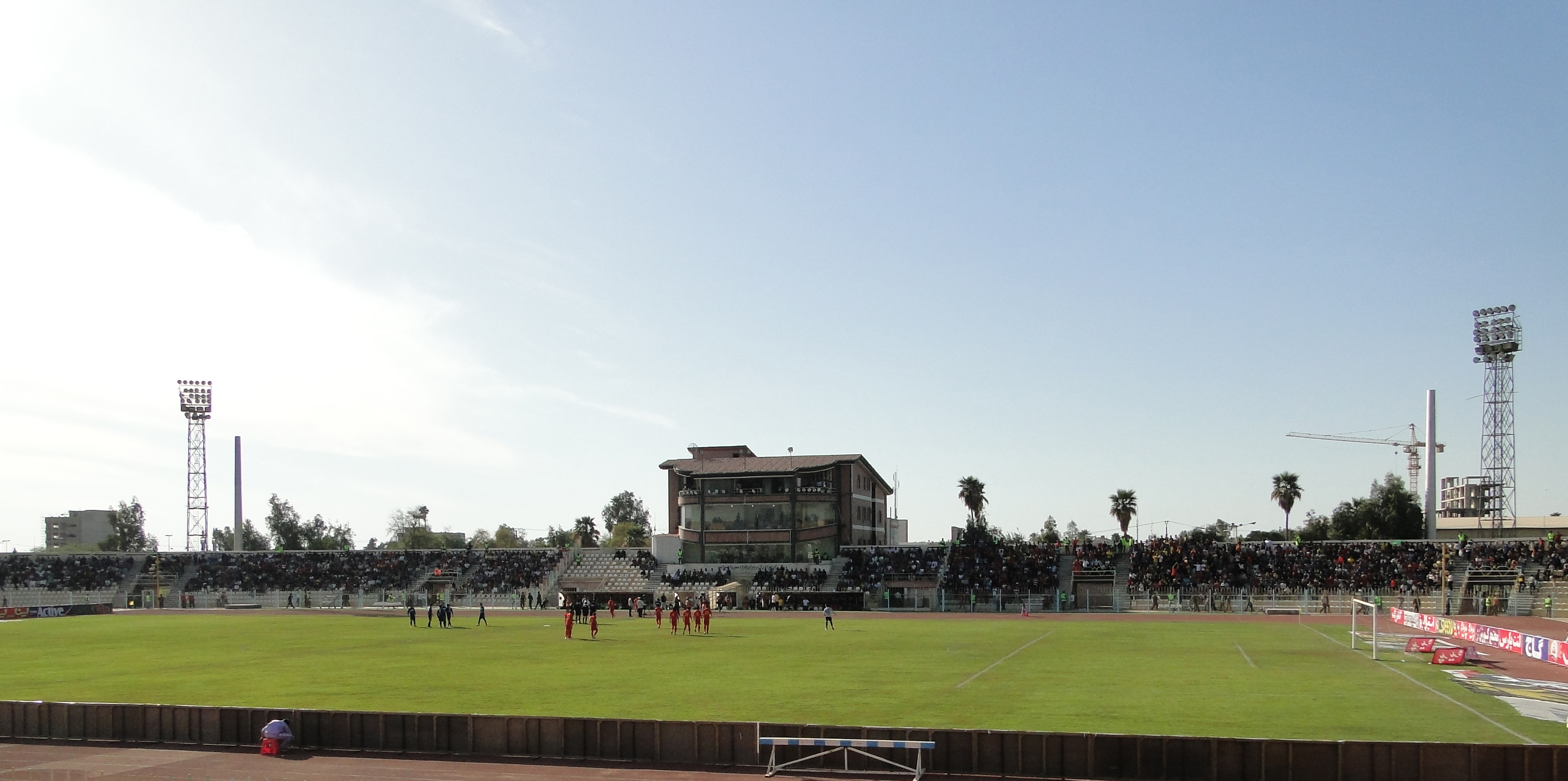
Takhti Ahvaz

Esteghlal Ahvaz plays their home games at the Takhti Ahvaz which has a seating capacity of 10,000. The stadium was opened in 1978 and is owned by the Municipality of Ahvaz. The stadium was renovated in 2005 and 2012. It is also the home venue of local rival Shahin Ahvaz.

Furthermore, Esteghlal Ahvaz played two matches in the 2015–16 Persian Gulf Pro League season at Ghadir. They played also their Hazfi Cup match in this season there.

=== Average attendances ===
Season	Division	Average
2005–06	1	5,667
2006–07	1	6,267
2007–08	1	7,938
2008–09	1	5,000
2009–10	1	5,059
2010–11	2	1,800
2015–16	1	1,773
2016–17	2	927

Notes:
Matches with spectator bans are not included in average attendances

== Supporters ==
Due to the Iran–Iraq War, the people paid very little attention to the club and football in general in the 1980s.

Based on weak years between 2010 and 2015, the club has to fight with falling attendance numbers and sinking popularity.

Last but not least the fans stands out negative sometimes. For instance the fans threw stones in the field in a match against Persepolis on 22 April 2016. As a result of this, Esteghlal Ahvaz had to play three matches with a ban on spectators.

== Rivalries ==
Esteghlal Ahvaz' main rival is Foolad.

=== Ahvaz Derby ===
Esteghlal Ahvaz' longest-running and deepest rivalry is with the other major club in Ahvaz, Foolad Khuzestan. Matches between the two clubs are referred to as the Ahvaz Derby. Although Foolad represents the Arab minority of Ahvaz, while the supporters of Esteghlal Ahvaz are primarily Persians, there is no any ethnic rivalry in the derby. After weak seasons of Esteghlal Ahvaz in the past, the derby lost in importance.

=== Further rivalries ===
Other smaller rivalries within Ahvaz include those with Esteghlal Khuzestan and Shahin Ahvaz.

== Seasons ==
The table below chronicles the achievements of Esteghlal Ahvaz in various competitions since 1970.

Season	Division	League	Position	Hazfi Cup	Notes
1970–71	1	Local League	3rd (Region D)	Not held
1971–72	1	Local League	3rd (Region C)	Not held
1991–92	1	Azadegan League	8th
1992–93	1	Azadegan League	5th (Group B)
1993–94	1	Azadegan League	14th
1994–95	1	Azadegan League	4th (Group B)
1995–96	1	Azadegan League	7th
1996–97	1	Azadegan League	9th
1997–98	1	Azadegan League	13th		Relegated
1998–99	2	League 2	4th (Group 1)	Semi-Final
1999–00	2	League 2	5th (2nd Round)
2000–01	2	League 2	3rd (Group 3)
2001–02	2	Azadegan League	1st (2nd Round)		Promoted
2002–03	1	Persian Gulf Pro League	11th
2003–04	1	Persian Gulf Pro League	8th	Quarter-Final
2004–05	1	Persian Gulf Pro League	5th	Semi-Final
2005–06	1	Persian Gulf Pro League	12th	Round of 32
2006–07	1	Persian Gulf Pro League	2nd	Quarter-Final	Runners-up
2007–08	1	Persian Gulf Pro League	8th	Round of 16
2008–09	1	Persian Gulf Pro League	14th	Round of 16
2009–10	1	Persian Gulf Pro League	18th	Round of 32	Relegated
2010–11	2	Azadegan League	13th (Group B)	3rd Round	Relegated
2011–12	3	League 2	1st (Group A)	1st Round	Promoted
2012–13	2	Azadegan League	10th (Group A)	Round of 32
2013–14	2	Azadegan League	8th (Group A)	3rd Round
2014–15	2	Azadegan League	9th (Group A)	Round of 32	Promoted
2015–16	1	Persian Gulf Pro League	16th	Round of 32	Relegated
2016–17	2	Azadegan League	18th	2nd Round	Relegated
2017–18	3	League 2	8th	did not enter
2018–19	3	League 2	11th	did not enter	Relegated
2019–20	4	League 3	Disqualified	did not enter	Relegated

Notes:
The Persian Gulf Pro League was formerly known as Iran Pro League (IPL) and Persian Gulf Cup (PGC)
The Azadegan League was the highest division between 1991 and 2001
The League 2 was formerly known as Iran 2nd Division
The League 3 was formerly known as Iran 3rd Division

== Honours ==
=== Domestic ===
- Persian Gulf Pro League
  - Runners-up (1): 2006–07
- Azadegan League
  - Winners (1): 2001–02
- League 2
  - Winners (1): 2011–12

== Players ==
=== First team squad ===
As of 1 September 2016.

Note: Flags indicate national team as defined under FIFA eligibility rules; some limited exceptions apply. Players may hold more than one non-FIFA nationality.

No.	Pos.	Nation	Player
10	MF	IRI	Adel Kolahkaj
13	FW	IRI	Ali Bigdeli
15	DF	IRI	Peyman Taleshi ^{U23}
20	DF	IRI	Mehdi Eslami
24	FW	IRI	Reza Bahmaei ^{U23}
25	DF	IRI	Milad Rabbani ^{U23}
26	DF	IRI	Maki Sharifi
28	FW	IRI	Mehdi Niyayesh Pour
29	MF	IRI	Mohammad Javad Kerdouni ^{U21}

No.	Pos.	Nation	Player
31	MF	IRI	Mojtaba Rashidi ^{U21}
32	MF	IRI	Sadegh Zharfani ^{U21}
34	DF	IRI	Mehdi Yalali ^{U21}
38	FW	IRI	Mirfarzad Majidi
39	DF	IRI	Adel Masoudifard ^{U23}
45	GK	IRI	Ali Kordani
—	MF	IRI	Pedram Ardalany

For recent transfers, see List of Iranian football transfers summer 2016.

== Coaches ==
=== Coaches since 1993 ===
No.	Coach	from	until	Major Titles	
1	(Iran) Bahram Atef	July 1993	June 2001	0	
2	(Iran) Mehdi Monajati	July 2001	2002	0	
3	(Iran) Jalal Cheraghpour	2002	June 2002	1	Azadegan League
4	(Iran) Amir Ghalenoei	July 2002	June 2003	0	
5	(Iran) Nasser Hejazi	July 2003	June 2004	0	
6	(Croatia) Luka Bonačić	July 2004	2005	0	
7	(Armenia) Martik Khachatourian	2005	2005	0	
8	(Iran) Mahmoud Yavari	2005	June 2005	0	
9	(Serbia) Srđan Gemaljević	July 2005	June 2006	0	
10	(Iran) Firouz Karimi	July 2006	November 2007	0	
11	(Iran) Majid Jalali	November 2007	May 2008	0	
12	(Iran) Karim Boustani	July 2008	August 2008	0	
13	(Iran) Mahmoud Yavari	August 2008	August 2008	0	
14	(Iran) Reza Ahadi	August 2008	August 2008	0	
15	(Iran) Akbar Misaghian	August 2008	February 2009	0	
16	(Iran) Khodadad Azizi	June 2009	September 2009	0	
17	(Iran) Majid Bagherinia	2009	2009	0	
18	(Iran) Mohammad Ahmadzadeh	2009	2009	0	
19	(Iran) Mehdi Hasheminasab	2009	2009	0	
20	(Iran) Alireza Firouzi	2009	September 2010	0	
21	(Iran) Dariush Yazdi	September 2010	January 2011	0	
22	(Iran) Firouz Karimi	February 2011	March 2011	0	
23	(Iran) Afshin Kamaei	March 2011	March 2011	0	
24	(Iran) Fereydoon Fazli	April 2011	April 2011	0	
25	(Iran) Dariush Yazdi	April 2011	May 2011	0	
26	(Iran) Adel Hardani	July 2011	November 2012	0	
27	(Iran) Masoud Norouzi	November 2012	November 2012	0	
28	(Iran) Ali Hanteh	November 2012	June 2013	1	League 2
29	(Iran) Davoud Mahabadi	July 2013	June 2014	0	
30	(Iran) Dariush Yazdi	July 2014	2015	0	
31	(Iran) Habib Khadirian	2015	2015	0	
32	(Iran) Fereydoun Hardani	2015	2015	0	
33	(Iran) Hossein Seyed-Salehi	2015	2015	0	
34	(Iran) Saber Mirghorbani	2015	June 2015	0	
35	(Iran) Siavash Bakhtiarizadeh	July 2015	October 2015	0	
36	(Iran) Ali Hanteh	November 2015	December 2015	0	
37	(Iran) Siavash Bakhtiarizadeh	January 2016	June 2016	0	
38	(Iran) Hamidreza Farzaneh	July 2016	December 2016	0	
39	(Iran) Siavash Bakhtiarizadeh	January 2017		0	

== Club chairmen ==
=== Chairmen since 2002 ===
No.	Coach	from	until
1	(Iran) Nasrollah Heibodi		2002
2	(Iran) Ali Shafizadeh	2002	2006
3	(Iran) Shahram Shafizadeh	2006	2011
4	(Iran) Safar Jamalpour	2011	2016
5	(Iran) Farshid Faraji	2016	

== See also ==
- Esteghlal Tehran
- Esteghlal Khuzestan
- FC Istiklol
- 2016–17 Azadegan League
- 2016-17 Hazfi Cup
