= Nosrat Irandoost =

Iranian footballer and manager

Personal information
- Full name: Nosrat Irandoost
- Date of birth: May 1, 1949 (age 77)
- Place of birth: Bandar Anzali, Iran
- Position: Midfielder

Team information
- Current team: Malavan (technical director)

Youth career
- 1968–1969: Malavan

Senior career*
Years	Team	Apps	(Gls)
1969–1981	Malavan		

Managerial career
- 1997–2000: Malavan
- 2004–2006: Malavan
- 2007–2008: Shahin Bushehr
- 2008–2009: Shahrdari Bandar Abbas
- 2011–2014: Chooka Talesh
- 2014: Malavan
- * Club domestic league appearances and goals

Nosrat Irandoost (Persian: نصرت ایراندوست, born May 1, 1949) is a retired Iranian football player and manager. He is currently technical director of Malavan.

== Playing career ==
Irandoost spent his entire career playing for Malavan. In 1976, he helped the team win the Hazfi Cup. In 1977, Malavan engaged Irandoost as a player-coach. This arrangement lasted until he retired in 1981.

He also played two matches with Malavan that represented Iran at the tournament under the country's name at the 1974 RCD Cup, playing in a game against Turkey.

== Managerial career ==
After his retirement in 1981, Irandoost started his managerial career in 1997 with Malavan F.C. His tenure ended when the team hired Mohammad Ahmadzadeh in 2000. After taking a short break from coaching, Irandoost was hired was an assistant coach to Majid Jalali at Pas Tehran. However, when Jalili was fired and replaced with Homayoun Shahrokhi, Irandoost also found himself out of a job.

In 2007, Irandoost was hired as the manager of Shahin Bushehr. However, his placement was short-lived, as the team did poorly, placing 8th in the 2007–08 Azadegan League and making a first round exit from the Hazfi Cup. Irandoost continued his managerial career the following season at Shahrdari Bandar Abbas. Much like his previous tenure, his time at the club ended early due to poor results.

Irandoost became the head coach of 2nd Division club Chooka Talesh in 2011, before returning to Malavan in 2014. He was sacked after six months for poor results.

== Personal life ==
Nosrat's daughter Maryam Irandoost is a former professional football player and has coached the Iran women's national team.
