= Gahar Zagros F.C. =

Iranian football club

Gahar Zagros
- Full name: Gahar Zagros Football Club
- Short name: Gahar
- Founded: July 2006; 19 years ago
- Ground: Takhti Stadium; Dorood
- Capacity: 3,600
- Chairman: Esmaeil Heydarpour
- League: 3rd Division
- 2014–15: 2nd Division Group D, 10th (relegated)
Home colours	Away colours

Gahar Zagros Football Club (former named by Damash Lorestan) is an Iranian professional football club based in Dorood, Lorestan. Founded in 2006, the club competes in the 2nd Division.

== History ==
=== Establishment in Tehran ===
Damash Iranian were set up in July 2006 in Tehran by a private investor and played in Iran Football's 2nd Division for one season before being promoted to Azadegan League.

=== Azadegan League ===
Competing in Group A of Azadegan League season 2007/08, Damash managed to share the top of the league with Shahrdari Bandar Abbas.

=== Hazfi Cup ===
In the 2006/07 Hazfi Cup Damash managed to knock out IPL side F.C. Zob Ahan 5–4 on penalty kicks in the round of 32, progressing to the round of 16 where they met Bargh Shiraz F.C. and lost 5–4 on penalties. Damash entered the next season of Hazfi Cup in the Third Round Proper and were eliminated by Steel Azin on penalties.

=== Establishment of Damash Lorestan ===
Damash Lorestan was formed as a result of the dissolution of Damash Tehran on July 9, 2008. Damash moved to city of Dorood and was renamed Gahar Zagros.

=== Gahar Zagros ===
In June 2011, the football club changed its name from Damash Lorestan to Gahar Zagros. In 2011/2012 Davoud Mahabadi was signed as coach and led Gahar Zagros to Iran Pro League, by finishing second in Azadegan League and thanks to playoff victory against Iranjavan F.C. This is the first time in team and Lorestan Province history that it had reached the top tier of Iranian football. Unfortunately the following year the club was relegated back to the Azadegan League. The following year the club was relegated to the 2nd Division.

== Seasons ==
Year	Division	Position	Hazfi Cup	Notes
2006–07	2nd Division	3rd	1/8 Final	Promoted
2007–08	Azadegan League	8th	First Round	
2008–09	Azadegan League	4th	First Round	
2009–10	Azadegan League	11th	Second Round	
2010–11	Azadegan League	12th	3rd Round	
2011–12	Azadegan League	2nd	1/16 Final	Promoted
2012–13	Iran Pro League	18th	1/16 Final	Relegated
2013–14	Azadegan League	13th	Third Round	Relegated
2014–15	2nd Division	10th	Third Round	Relegated

== Club managers ==
- (Iran) Reza Shahroudi (2006–07)
- (Iran) Amir Hossein Peyrovani (2007–08)
- (Iran) Hamid Alidoosti (2008)
- (Iran) Human Afazeli (2008–09)
- (Iran) Markar Aghajanian (2009)
- (Croatia) Darko Dražić (2010–11)
- (Iran) Amir Hossein Peyrovani (2011)
- (Iran) Davoud Mahabadi (2011–12)
- (Iran) Mehdi Tartar (June 2012 – Sept 12)
- (Iran) Mohammad Mayeli Kohan (Oct 2012 – May 13)
- (Iran) Mohammad Ahmadzadeh (Aug 2013 – Jan 14)
- (Iran) Alireza Delikhon (Jan 2014–1 March 14)

== See also ==
- Hazfi Cup
- 2011–12 Azadegan League
- Damash Gilan
- Parseh Tehran
