= 2014–15 Tractor S.C. season =

Tractor
2014–15 season
- Chairman: Jamshid Nazmi
- Manager: Rasoul Khatibi (until 8 February 2015); Toni (from 15 February 2015)
- Stadium: Sahand Stadium
- Persian Gulf Pro League: 2nd
- Hazfi Cup: Quarter-Final
- ACL: Group stage
- Top goalscorer: League: Edinho (20); All: Edinho (22)
- Highest home attendance: 80,000 v Naft Tehran (15 May 2015)
- Lowest home attendance: 0 (spectator ban) v Zob Ahan (11 December 2014)
- Average home league attendance: 27,488
| Home colours | Away colours |

The 2014–15 season is Tractor's 6th season in the Persian Gulf Pro League. They will also be competing in the Hazfi Cup and AFC Champions League. Tractor is captained by Mehdi Kiani.

== Club ==
=== Current coaching staff ===
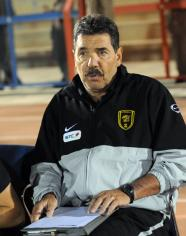
Toni, the Tractor manager

| Position | Staff |
|---|---|
| Head coach | Toni |
| First team coach | Younes Bahonar |
| Assistant coach | Amir Masoud Eghbali |
| Assistant coach | Luiz Migonez |
| Fitness coach | Saeid Nikokheslat |
| Goalkeeper coach | George Tabárez |
| Analyzer | António Oliveira |
| Doctor & Physiotherapist | Ramzan Norouzzadeh |
| Psychologist | Akbar Sobhi |
| B team manager | Farhad Pourgholami |
| Technical manager | Ahad Sheykhlari |

=== Management ===
| Position | Staff |
|---|---|
| President | Saeed Abbasi |
| Vice President | Khosro Abdollahzadeh |
| Board chairman | Ali Akbar Pourjamshidian |
| Board members | Sadegh Najafi-Khazarlou; Alireza Navin; Mohammad Javad Dolfkar; Muhammad Ismail Saidi; Ghafour Kargari; Dara Ghaznavi; Mohammad Ali Mojtahedi |
| Fans club president | Rahman Yavaran |
| Academy manager | Sadegh Pourhossein |

== First Team Squad ==
=== Current squad ===
As of 22 January 2015

Note: Flags indicate national team as defined under FIFA eligibility rules; some limited exceptions apply. Players may hold more than one non-FIFA nationality.

| No. | Pos. | Nation | Player |
|---|---|---|---|
| 1 | GK | IRN | Hamed Lak |
| 2 | DF | IRN | Mohammad Iranpourian |
| 3 | DF | IRN | Habib Gordani (vice captain) |
| 4 | DF | IRN | Khaled Shafiei |
| 6 | MF | IRN | Mehdi Kiani (captain) |
| 7 | MF | IRN | Saman Nariman Jahan |
| 8 | FW | IRN | Shahin Saghebi (on loan from Malavan) |
| 9 | FW | IRN | Farid Karimi |
| 10 | FW | BRA | Edinho |
| 12 | MF | IRN | Mohammad Pour Rahmatollah (on loan from Malavan) |
| 13 | DF | BRA | Célio |
| 14 | MF | IRN | Andranik Teymourian |

| No. | Pos. | Nation | Player |
|---|---|---|---|
| 18 | MF | IRN | Ahmad Amir Kamdar |
| 19 | FW | IRN | Mehrdad Bayrami |
| 21 | FW | IRN | Mohsen Delir |
| 23 | DF | IRN | Mirhani Hashemi |
| 27 | MF | IRN | Farshad Ahmadzadeh (on loan from Persepolis) |
| 29 | FW | IRN | Peyman Keshavarz |
| 35 | FW | IRN | Peyman Babaei |
| 40 | GK | IRN | Mohammad Ali Ramezanian |
| 77 | MF | IRN | Saeid Aghaei (on loan from Gostaresh) |
| 44 | GK | SEN | Issa Ndoye |
| 69 | DF | IRN | Mehdi Ghoreishi |
| 88 | DF | IRN | Fardin Abedini |

== Transfers ==
=== Summer ===
In: Note: Flags indicate national team as defined under FIFA eligibility rules; some limited exceptions apply. Players may hold more than one non-FIFA nationality.

| No. | Pos. | Nation | Player |
|---|---|---|---|
| 7 | MF | IRN | Saman Nariman Jahan (on loan from Gostaresh Foolad) |
| 9 | FW | IRN | Farid Karimi (on loan from Saba Qom) |
| 8 | FW | IRN | Shahin Saghebi (on loan from Malavan) |
| 4 | DF | IRN | Khaled Shafiei (from Gostaresh Foolad) |
| 23 | DF | IRN | Mirhani Hashemi (from Padideh) |
| 12 | MF | IRN | Mohammad Pour Rahmatollah (on loan from Malavan) |
| 5 | DF | IRN | Ahmad Alenemeh (from Naft Tehran) |
| 15 | DF | ALB | Ditmar Bicaj (from (Albania) Skënderbeu) |
| 17 | FW | IRQ | Alaa Abdul-Zahra (from (Iraq) Dohuk) |
| 18 | MF | IRN | Ahmad Amir Kamdar (from Gostaresh Foolad) |
| 30 | FW | BRA | Edinho (from Mes Kerman) |
| 29 | MF | IRN | Peyman Keshavarz (promoted from Tractor U21) |
| 26 | MF | IRN | Hassan Fathollahzadeh (promoted from Tractor U21) |
| 44 | DF | IRN | Mohammadreza Shahmohammadi (promoted from Tractor U21) |

Out: Note: Flags indicate national team as defined under FIFA eligibility rules; some limited exceptions apply. Players may hold more than one non-FIFA nationality.

| No. | Pos. | Nation | Player |
|---|---|---|---|
| 20 | DF | IRN | Mohammad Nosrati (to Paykan) |
| 88 | DF | IRN | Morteza Asadi (to Gostaresh Foolad) |
| 7 | MF | IRN | Mehdi Karimian (to Esteghlal) |
| 8 | MF | IRN | Ali Karimi (Retired) |
| 10 | FW | IRN | Saeid Daghighi (to Paykan) |
| 13 | MF | IRN | Masoud Ebrahimzadeh (to Saipa) |
| 9 | FW | IRN | Javad Kazemian (Released) |
| 17 | MF | IRN | Meysam Baou (Released) |
| 28 | MF | IRN | Mohammad Hossein Mehrazma (Released) |
| 29 | DF | IRN | Navid Khosh Hava (Released) |
| 11 | FW | IRN | Karim Ansarifard (to Osasuna) |
| 4 | DF | IRN | Farshid Talebi (Released) |
| 32 | DF | IRN | Firouz Pashapour (Released) |
| 26 | DF | IRN | Mohammad Ebadzadeh (Released) |

=== Winter ===
In: Note: Flags indicate national team as defined under FIFA eligibility rules; some limited exceptions apply. Players may hold more than one non-FIFA nationality.

| No. | Pos. | Nation | Player |
|---|---|---|---|
| — | MF | IRN | Sina Ashouri (from Zob Ahan – Conscription) |
| — | DF | IRN | Ali Hamoudi (from Sepahan – Conscription) |
| — | DF | IRN | Shoja' Khalilzadeh (from Sepahan – Conscription) |
| 19 | FW | IRN | Mehrdad Bayrami (from Gostaresh Foulad) |
| 44 | GK | SEN | Issa Ndoye (from Free Agent) |
| 16 | MF | BRA | Radamés (from (Brazil) Vila Nova) |
| 69 | DF | IRN | Mehdi Qoreyshi (from Gostaresh Foulad) |
| 14 | MF | IRN | Andranik Teymourian (from Esteghlal) |
| 88 | DF | IRN | Fardin Abedini (from Mes Kerman) |
| 13 | DF | BRA | Célio (from Free Agent) |

Out: Note: Flags indicate national team as defined under FIFA eligibility rules; some limited exceptions apply. Players may hold more than one non-FIFA nationality.

| No. | Pos. | Nation | Player |
|---|---|---|---|
| 17 | MF | IRQ | Alaa Abdul-Zahra (to (Iraq) Al-Shorta) |
| 11 | FW | IRN | Mohammad Ebrahimi (to Gostaresh Foulad) |
| 5 | DF | IRN | Ahmad Alenemeh (to Foolad) |
| 15 | DF | ALB | Ditmar Bicaj (to (Albania) Flamurtari Vlorë) |
| 22 | GK | IRN | Davoud Noushi Soufiani (to Gostaresh Foulad) |
| 31 | MF | IRN | Ebrahim Abednezhad (to Shahrdari Tabriz) |
| 16 | MF | BRA | Radamés (to (Brazil) Paysandu) |

== Competitions ==
=== Overall ===
| Competition | Started round | Current position / round | Final position / round | First match | Last match |
|---|---|---|---|---|---|
| Iran Pro League | — | 2nd | 2nd | 31 July 2014 | 15 May 2015 |
| Hazfi Cup | Round of 32 | Quarter-Final | Quarter-Final | 17 October 2014 | 27 November 2014 |
| AFC Champions League | Group-Stage | Group-Stage | Group-Stage | 25 February 2015 | 5 May 2015 |

Source: Competitions

=== Competition record ===
| Competition | Record | | | | | | | |
| Competition | G | W | D | L | GF | GA | GD | Win % |
|---|---|---|---|---|---|---|---|---|
| Persian Gulf Pro League | 30 | 17 | 7 | 6 | 58 | 34 | +24 | 56.67 |
| Hazfi Cup | 3 | 2 | 0 | 1 | 5 | 2 | +3 | 66.67 |
| AFC Champions League | 6 | 1 | 1 | 4 | 7 | 11 | −4 | 16.67 |
| Total | 39 | 20 | 8 | 11 | 70 | 47 | +23 | 51.28 |

=== Persian Gulf Pro League ===
==== Standings ====
| Pos | Team | Pld | W | D | L | GF | GA | GD | Pts | Qualification or relegation |
|---|---|---|---|---|---|---|---|---|---|---|
| 1 | Sepahan (C) | 30 | 17 | 8 | 5 | 46 | 27 | +19 | 59 | Qualification for the 2016 AFC Champions League group stage |
| 2 | Tractor Sazi | 30 | 17 | 7 | 6 | 58 | 34 | +24 | 58 | Qualification for the 2016 AFC Champions League group stage |
| 3 | Naft Tehran | 30 | 16 | 10 | 4 | 45 | 28 | +17 | 58 | Qualification for the 2016 AFC Champions League qualifying play-off |
| 4 | Zob Ahan | 30 | 14 | 10 | 6 | 46 | 26 | +20 | 52 | Qualification for the 2016 AFC Champions League Group stage (Note: Zob Ahan secured qualification for the 2016 AFC Champions League through winning the 2014–15 Hazfi Cup.) |
| 5 | Foolad | 30 | 15 | 7 | 8 | 33 | 24 | +9 | 52 | |

Updated to match(es) played on 15 May 2015. Source: FIFA.com
Rules for classification: 1) points; 2) goal difference; 3) number of goals scored.
(C) Champions

==== Results summary ====
| Overall | | | | | | | | Home | | | | | | Away | | | | | |
| Pld | W | D | L | GF | GA | GD | Pts | W | D | L | GF | GA | GD | W | D | L | GF | GA | GD |
|---|---|---|---|---|---|---|---|---|---|---|---|---|---|---|---|---|---|---|---|
| 30 | 17 | 7 | 6 | 58 | 34 | +24 | 58 | 9 | 4 | 2 | 31 | 18 | +13 | 8 | 3 | 4 | 27 | 16 | +11 |

Last updated: 15 May 2015.
Source: Ipl Stats

==== Results by round ====
| Round | 1 | 2 | 3 | 4 | 5 | 6 | 7 | 8 | 9 | 10 | 11 | 12 | 13 | 14 | 15 | 16 | 17 | 18 | 19 | 20 | 21 | 22 | 23 | 24 | 25 | 26 | 27 | 28 | 29 | 30 |
|---|---|---|---|---|---|---|---|---|---|---|---|---|---|---|---|---|---|---|---|---|---|---|---|---|---|---|---|---|---|---|
| Ground | H | A | H | A | H | H | A | H | A | H | A | H | A | H | A | A | H | A | H | A | A | H | A | H | A | H | A | H | A | H |
| Result | W | D | W | L | W | W | W | W | D | D | W | L | W | D | L | L | W | D | L | W | W | W | W | W | L | W | W | D | W | D |
| Position | 3 | 4 | 2 | 7 | 3 | 2 | 2 | 1 | 1 | 1 | 1 | 1 | 1 | 1 | 1 | 3 | 3 | 4 | 5 | 5 | 2 | 2 | 2 | 2 | 2 | 1 | 1 | 1 | 1 | 2 |

Updated to match(es) played on 15 May 2015. Source: "Ipl".
A = Away; H = Home; W = Win; D = Draw; L = Loss

==== Matches ====
Win Draw Loss Postponed

| Date Round | Home | Score | Away | Location |

| 31 July 2014 1 | Tractor | 2–1 | Foolad | Tabriz |
| 17:30 DST+03:30 | Nariman Jahan 31'; Edinho 82' | Report | Mesarić 74' | Stadium: Sahand; Attendance: 20,000; Referee: Alireza Faghani |

| 8 August 2014 2 | Zob Ahan | 0–0 | Tractor | Isfahan |
| | | Report | | Stadium: Fooladshahr Stadium; Attendance: 1,500; Referee: Ghasem Vahedi |

| 15 August 2014 3 | Tractor | 1 – 0 | Malavan | Tabriz |
| | Edinho 7' | | | Stadium: Sahand; Attendance: 14,000 |

| 19 August 2014 4 | Padideh | 1 – 0 | Tractor | Mashhad |
| | Jovanović 53' | | | Stadium: Samen; Attendance: 12,500 |

| 24 August 2014 5 | Tractor | 4 – 2 | Saba Qom | Tabriz |
| | Edinho 43'; Delir 49'; Edinho 72'; Iranpourian 90+4' (pen.) | | Hassanzadeh 16'; Kalantari 41' (pen.) | Stadium: Sahand; Attendance: 8,000 |

| 29 August 2014 6 | Tractor | 3 – 0 | Naft MIS | Tabriz |
| | Delir 18'; S. Nariman Jahan 75'; Delir 88' | | | Stadium: Sahand; Attendance: 10,400 |

| 5 September 2014 7 | Persepolis | 1 - 3 | Tractor | Tehran |
| 18:50 DST+03:30 | M. Bengar 39'; H. Mahini (yellow card) 73' | Summary; Stats; Live TV: IRIB TV3 / Jame Jam 2 | Kh. Shafiei (yellow card) 12'; M. Kiani (yellow card) 66'; S. Makani 68' (o.g.); M. Dalir (yellow card) 73'; Edinho 85'; S. Nariman Jahan 90+2' | Stadium: Azadi Stadium; Attendance: 35,000; Referee: Ahmad Salehi |

| 12 September 2014 8 | Tractor | 4 - 1 | Rah Ahan | Tabriz |
| | Edinho 3'; S. Nariman Jahan 60'; Delir 77'; Irannejad 81' (o.g.) | | Azimi 10' | Stadium: Sahand; Attendance: 12,000 |

| 18 September 2014 9 | Esteghlal Khuzestan | 2 - 2 | Tractor | Ahvaz |
| | Majidi 43' (pen.); Seifollahi 51' | | Edinho 39'; Delir 81' | Stadium: Ghadir Stadium; Attendance: 1,500 |

| 26 September 2014 10 | Tractor | 1 – 1 | Sepahan | Tabriz |
| | Khalilzadeh 70' (o.g.) | | Khalatbari 49' | Stadium: Sahand; Attendance: 51,500 |

| 3 October 2014 11 | Saipa | 0 – 1 | Tractor | Karaj |
| | | | Delir 12' | Stadium: Enghelab Stadium; Attendance: 3,500 |

| 22 October 2014 12 | Tractor | 1 – 2 | Paykan | Tabriz |
| | Iranpourian 83' (pen.) | | Daghighi 2'; Nouri 58' | Stadium: Sahand; Attendance: 12,700 |

| 31 October 2014 13 | Gostaresh | 1 – 3 | Tractor | Tabriz |
| | Ansari 27' | | Ahmadzadeh 7'; Edinho 14'; Edinho 88' (pen.) | Stadium: Sahand; Attendance: 15,000 |

| 7 November 2014 14 | Tractor | 2 – 2 | Esteghlal | Tabriz |
| 16:30 IRDT (UTC+04:30) | Khaled Shafiei (yellow card) 42'; Shahin Saghebi 75'; Edinho 86' | varzesh3 | Karrar Jassim (yellow card) 57'; Arash Borhani 62'; Amir Hossein Sadeghi 90+5' | Stadium: Sahand; Attendance: 65,000; Referee: Alireza Faghani |

| 21 November 2014 15 | Naft Tehran | 2 – 1 | Tractor | Tehran |
| | Rezaei 43'; Rezaei 56' | | Bicaj 45' | Stadium: Takhti Tehran; Attendance: 5,000 |

| 2 December 2014 16 | Foolad | 3 – 2 | Tractor | Ahvaz |
| | Ansari 13'; Nong 34'; Jama'ati 60' | | Edinho 4'; Edinho 56' | Stadium: Ghadir; Attendance: 6,500 |

| 11 December 2014 17 | Tractor | 2 – 1 | Zob Ahan | Tabriz |
| | Bayrami 32'; Iranpourian 83' (pen.) | | Hassanzadeh 43' | Stadium: Sahand; Attendance: 0 |

| 30 January 2015 18 | Malavan | 0 – 0 | Tractor | Bandar-e Anzali |
| | | | | Stadium: Takhti Anzali; Attendance: 6,000 |

| 6 February 2015 19 | Tractor | 1 – 3 | Padideh | Tabriz |
| | Prahić 40' (o.g.) | | Haghighi 22' (pen.); Nasimov 45'; Nasehi 51' | Stadium: Sahand; Attendance: 15,000 |

| 13 February 2015 20 | Saba Qom | 2 – 3 | Tractor | Qom |
| | Badamaki 60'; Badamaki 68' | | S. Nariman Jahan 23'; Edinho 36' (pen.); Teymourian 66' | Stadium: Yadegar-e Emam Qom; Attendance: 1,004 |

| 19 February 2015 21 | Naft MIS | 1 – 2 | Tractor | Masjed Soleyman |
| | Bouhamdan 11' (pen.) | | S. Nariman Jahan 33'; Edinho 83' | Stadium: Behnam Mohammadi; Attendance: 5,000 |

| 6 March 2015 22 | Tractor | 1 – 0 | Persepolis | Tabriz |
| | Saghebi 61' | | | Stadium: Sahand; Attendance: 30,178 |

| 12 March 2015 23 | Rah Ahan | 0 – 3 | Tractor | Qods |
| | | | F. Karimi 44'; Kiani 86'; Edinho 88' | Stadium: Shahre Qods Stadium; Attendance: 3,700 |

| 3 April 2015 24 | Tractor | 3 – 0 | Esteghlal Khuzestan | Tabriz |
| | A. Hassanzadeh 40'; Edinho 57' 86'; Teymourian 81' | | | Stadium: Sahand; Attendance: 15,000 |

| 12 April 2015 25 | Sepahan | 2 – 1 | Tractor | Isfahan |
| | Pereira Mendes 76' (pen.); Navidkia 90' | | Edinho 45' | Stadium: Foolad Shahr; Attendance: 3,200 |

| 16 April 2015 26 | Tractor | 2 – 1 | Saipa | Tabriz |
| | Delir 82'; Shiri 90+3' (o.g.) | | Nozhati 10' | Stadium: Sahand; Attendance: 35,050 |

| 25 April 2015 27 | Paykan | 0 – 2 | Tractor | Qods |
| | | | Ahmadzadeh 7'; Edinho 80' (pen.) | Stadium: Shahre Qods Stadium; Attendance: 10,000 |

| 1 May 2015 28 | Tractor | 1 – 1 | Gostaresh | Tabriz |
| | Célio 25' | | Hosseini 61' | Stadium: Sahand; Attendance: 16,000 |

| 10 May 2015 29 | Esteghlal | 1 – 4 | Tractor | Tehran |
| | Ebrahimi 30' | | S. Nariman Jahan 8'; Edinho 45'; S. Nariman Jahan 56'; S. Nariman Jahan 87' | Stadium: Azadi Stadium; Attendance: 35,000 |

| 15 May 2015 30 | Tractor | 3 – 3 | Naft Tehran | Tabriz |
| | Edinho 37'; Teymourian 45'; F. Karimi 61' | | Ezzati 3'; Motahari 76'; Padovani 81' | Stadium: Sahand; Attendance: 80,000 |

=== Hazfi Cup ===
Win Draw Loss Postponed

| Date Round | Home | Score | Away | Location |

| 17 October 2014 Round of 32 | Tractor | 4 – 0 | Karun Khuzestan | Tabriz |
| 14:30 DST+03:30 | Saghebi 14'; Gordani 36'; Ebrahimi 71' (pen.); Ahmadzadeh 85' | | | Stadium: Sahand; Attendance: 12,000 |

| 26 October 2014 Round of 16 | Saipa | 0 – 0 (a.e.t.) (1 – 3 p) | Tractor | Karaj |
| 14:30 DST+03:30 | | | | Stadium: Enghelab Stadium; Attendance: 5,000 |
| | Penalties |
| | Rezaei (penalty missed); Ramezani (penalty missed); Sadeghi (penalty scored); Hamed Shiri (penalty missed) | | Kiani (penalty scored); Iranpourian (penalty missed); Aghaei (penalty scored); Ebrahimi (penalty scored) |

| 27 November 2014 Quarter-Final | Tractor | 1 – 2 | Padideh | Tabriz |
| 14:00 DST+03:30 | Ahmadzadeh 45+2' | | Prahić 80' (pen.); Nasimov 90+2' | Stadium: Sahand; Attendance: 36,000 |

=== AFC Champions League ===
==== Group stage ====
| Pos | Team | Pld | W | D | L | GF | GA | GD | Pts | Qualification | AHS | AHU | NSF | TRA |
|---|---|---|---|---|---|---|---|---|---|---|---|---|---|---|
| 1 | (Saudi Arabia) Al-Ahli | 6 | 3 | 3 | 0 | 11 | 7 | +4 | 12 | Advance to knockout stage | — | 2–1 | 2–1 | 2–0 |
| 2 | (United Arab Emirates) Al-Ahli | 6 | 2 | 2 | 2 | 8 | 8 | 0 | 8 | Advance to knockout stage | 3–3 | — | 0–0 | 3–2 |
| 3 | (Uzbekistan) Nasaf Qarshi | 6 | 2 | 2 | 2 | 5 | 5 | 0 | 8 | | 0–0 | 0–1 | — | 2–1 |
| 4 | (Iran) Tractor Sazi | 6 | 1 | 1 | 4 | 7 | 11 | −4 | 4 | | 2–2 | 1–0 | 1–2 | — |

Source: AFC

| Date Round | Home | Score | Away | Location |

| 25 February 2015 1 | Nasaf Qarshi (Uzbekistan) | 2 – 1 | (Iran) Tractor | Qarshi Markaziy Stadium, Qarshi |
| 18:00 UTC+5 | I. Shomurodov 46'; H. Karimov 52'; R. Roj (yellow card) 56' | Report | Edinho 32'; F. Abedini (yellow card) 52' | Attendance: 11,160; Referee: (Oman) Abdullah Al Hilali; Man of the Match: Ilkhom Shomurodov |

| 4 March 2015 2 | Tractor (Iran) | 1 – 0 | (United Arab Emirates) Al-Ahli | Yadegar-e-Emam Stadium, Tabriz |
| 16:00 UTC+3:30 | H. Gordani (yellow card) 17'; F. Ahmadzadeh 40'; A. Teymourian (yellow card) 55' | Report | K. Kwon (yellow card) 41'; A. Hussain (yellow card) 75'; M. Naser (yellow card) 82' | Attendance: 25,830; Referee: (South Korea) Ko Hyung-Jin; Man of the Match: Fardin Abedini |

| 18 March 2015 3 | Al-Ahli (Saudi Arabia) | 2 – 0 | (Iran) Tractor | King Abdullah Sports City, Jeddah |
| 20:20 UTC+3 | Al-Jassim 71', 79' | Report | | Attendance: 45,482; Referee: Ahmed Al-Kaf (Oman) |

| 7 April 2015 4 | Tractor (Iran) | 2 – 2 | (Saudi Arabia) Al-Ahli | Yadegar-e-Emam Stadium, Tabriz |
| 16:00 UTC+4:30 | Edinho 60'; Saghebi 77' | Report | Al Soma 74', 90' | Attendance: 32,500; Referee: Ryuji Sato (Japan) |

| 21 April 2015 5 | Tractor (Iran) | 1 – 2 | (Uzbekistan) Nasaf Qarshi | Yadegar-e-Emam Stadium, Tabriz |
| 18:00 UTC+4:30 | Kiani 52' | Report | Geworkýan 59', 71' | Attendance: 15,000; Referee: Muhammad Taqi Aljaafari Bin Jahari (Singapore) |

| 5 May 2015 6 | Al-Ahli (United Arab Emirates) | 3 – 2 | (Iran) Tractor | Al-Rashid Stadium, Dubai |
| 19:40 UTC+4 | Ribeiro 58'; Khalil 77', 88' | Report | Bayrami 21'; Nariman Jahan 67' | Attendance: 3,540; Referee: Kim Dong-jin (South Korea) |

== Kit and sponsorship ==
Tractor is currently sponsored by the Hamrah-e Aval (Mobile Telecommunication Company) and also Javanane Khayer Foundation. They were previously sponsored by the Bank Sepah. In July 2014, the club signed a contract with Kelme, starting from 2014–15 season.

| Years | Shirt sponsors |
|---|---|
| 1970–2009 | TMC |
| 2007–2010 | Bank Sepah |
| 2009–2012 | Hamrah-e Aval |
| 2012–2014 | Javanane Khayer Foundation |
| 2013– | Aysan Tabriz |
| 2014– | Hamrah-e Aval |

| Years | Kit manufacturers |
|---|---|
| 1970–1974 | Umbro |
| 1974–2005 | Puma |
| 2005–2010 | Daei Sport |
| 2010–2013 | Uhlsport |
| 2013–2014 | Merooj |
| 2014– | Kelme |
