= 2015–16 Tractor S.C. season =

Tractor
2015–16 season
- Chairman: Saeed Abbasi
- Manager: Toni (until 8 December 2015); Amir Ghalenoei (from 9 December 2015)
- Stadium: Sahand Stadium
- Persian Gulf Pro League: 4th
- Hazfi Cup: Semi-Final
- ACL: Round of 16
- Top goalscorer: League: Shoja' Khalilzadeh (2 goals); All: Shoja' Khalilzadeh (2 goals)
- Highest home attendance: 20,000 v Naft Tehran (31 July 2015); 20,000 v Persepolis (25 September 2015)
- Lowest home attendance: 0 (spectator ban) v Saipa (10 October 2015)
- Average home league attendance: 10,857
Home colours	Away colours

The 2015–16 season is Tractor's 7th season in the Persian Gulf Pro League. They will also be competing in the Hazfi Cup & AFC Champions League. Tractor is captained by Mohammad Iranpourian.

== Club ==
=== Current coaching staff ===
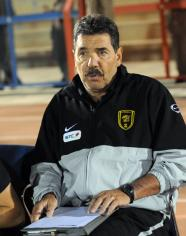
Toni, the Tractor manager

Position	Staff
Head coach	Amir Ghalenoei
First team coach	Younes Bahonar
Assistant coach	Amir Masoud Eghbali
Assistant coach	Luiz Migonez
Fitness coach	Saeid Nikokheslat
Goalkeeper coach	George Tabárez
Analyzer	António Oliveira
Doctor & Physiotherapist	Ramzan Norouzzadeh
Psychologist	Akbar Sobhi
B team manager	Farhad Pourgholami
Technical manager	Ahad Sheykhlari

=== Management ===
Position	Staff
President	Saeed Abbasi
Vice President	Khosro Abdollahzadeh
Board chairman	Ali Akbar Pourjamshidian
Board members	Sadegh Najafi-Khazarlou; Alireza Navin; Mohammad Javad Dolfkar; Muhammad Ismail Saidi; Ghafour Kargari; Dara Ghaznavi; Mohammad Ali Mojtahedi
Fans club president	Rahman Yavaran
Academy manager	Sadegh Pourhossein

== First Team Squad ==
=== Current squad ===
As of 7 July 2015

Note: Flags indicate national team as defined under FIFA eligibility rules; some limited exceptions apply. Players may hold more than one non-FIFA nationality.

No.	Pos.	Nation	Player
1	GK	IRI	Mohammadreza Akhbari ^{U23} (on loan from Saipa)
2	DF	IRI	Mohammad Iranpourian
3	DF	IRI	Shoja' Khalilzadeh (on loan from Sepahan)
4	DF	IRI	Khaled Shafiei
5	DF	BRA	Cardoso
6	MF	IRI	Sina Ashouri (on loan from Zob Ahan)
7	MF	IRI	Saman Nariman Jahan (2nd captain)
8	FW	IRI	Shahin Saghebi (on loan from Malavan)
9	FW	IRI	Farid Karimi
10	MF	IRI	Soroush Rafiei
11	MF	IRI	Bakhtiar Rahmani
16	MF	IRI	Mohammad Pour Rahmatollah ^{U21} (on loan from Malavan)
18	MF	PHI	Iain Ramsay

No.	Pos.	Nation	Player
19	MF	BRA	Augusto César
20	MF	IRI	Ahmad Abdollahzadeh ^{U23} (on loan from Foolad)
22	GK	IRI	Mohammad Ali Ramezanian ^{U23}
23	DF	IRI	Mirhani Hashemi
27	FW	CMR	Aloys Nong
29	FW	IRI	Peyman Keshavarz ^{U21}
33	GK	IRI	Mehrdad Tahmasbi
40	DF	IRI	Ali Hamoudi (on loan from Sepahan)
66	MF	IRI	Mehdi Kiani (Captain)
77	MF	IRI	Saeid Aghaei ^{U21} (on loan from Gostaresh Foulad)
88	DF	IRI	Fardin Abedini
99	FW	IRI	Mehrdad Bayrami
—	DF	IRI	Farzad Jafari

== Transfers ==
=== Summer ===
In: Note: Flags indicate national team as defined under FIFA eligibility rules; some limited exceptions apply. Players may hold more than one non-FIFA nationality.

No.	Pos.	Nation	Player
—	DF	IRI	Farzad Jafari (from Esteghlal Khuzestan – conscription)
1	GK	IRI	Mohammadreza Akhbari ^{PL} (from Saipa — conscription)
10	MF	IRI	Soroush Rafiei (from Foolad — conscription)
20	MF	IRI	Ahmad Abdollahzadeh (from Niroo Zamini, originally from Foolad — conscription)
11	MF	IRI	Bakhtiar Rahmani (from Foolad — conscription)
33	GK	IRI	Mehrdad Tahmasbi ^{PL} (from Saba Qom)
5	DF	BRA	Carlos Cardoso (from (Azerbaijan) Neftchi)
17	FW	TUN	Hamza Younés (from (Bulgaria) Ludogorets Razgrad)
19	MF	BRA	Augusto César (from (Brazil) Internacional)
18	DF	PHI	Iain Ramsay (from (Australia) Melbourne City)

Out: Note: Flags indicate national team as defined under FIFA eligibility rules; some limited exceptions apply. Players may hold more than one non-FIFA nationality.

No.	Pos.	Nation	Player
27	MF	IRI	Farshad Ahmadzadeh (to Persepolis – return from conscription)
35	FW	IRI	Peyman Babaei (Released)
21	FW	IRI	Mohsen Delir (to Gostaresh Foulad – return from conscription)
44	GK	SEN	Issa Ndoye (Released)
1	GK	IRI	Hamed Lak (to Saba Qom)
3	DF	IRI	Habib Gordani (to Sepahan)
6	MF	IRI	Mehdi Kiani (to Gostaresh Foulad)
33	DF	IRI	Shahriar Shirvand (to Gostaresh Foulad – return from conscription)
13	DF	BRA	Célio (to (United Arab Emirates) Al-Shaab)
10	FW	BRA	Edinho (to (Qatar) Al-Sailiya)
14	MF	IRI	Andranik Teymourian (to (Qatar) Umm Salal)
18	MF	IRI	Ahmad Amir Kamdar (to Siah Jamegan Khorasan)
69	DF	IRI	Mehdi Ghoreishi (to Aluminium Arak)

=== Winter ===
In: Note: Flags indicate national team as defined under FIFA eligibility rules; some limited exceptions apply. Players may hold more than one non-FIFA nationality.

No.	Pos.	Nation	Player
66	MF	IRI	Mehdi Kiani (from Gostaresh Foolad)
15	MF	IRI	Ayoub Kalantari (from Gostaresh Foolad)
24	FW	IRI	Farzad Hatami (from Malavan)
77	DF	IRI	Saeid Aghaei (from Gostaresh Foolad – previously on conscription)
—	FW	IRI	Mehran Ghorbanpour (promoted from Academy)

Out: Note: Flags indicate national team as defined under FIFA eligibility rules; some limited exceptions apply. Players may hold more than one non-FIFA nationality.

No.	Pos.	Nation	Player
9	FW	IRI	Farid Karimi (to Saba Qom – return from conscription)
7	MF	IRI	Saman Nariman Jahan (to Gostaresh Foolad – return from conscription)
99	FW	IRI	Mehrdad Bayrami (Released)
17	FW	TUN	Hamza Younés (Released)
31	MF	IRI	Ebrahim Abednezhad (Released)

== Competitions ==
=== Overall ===
Competition	Started round	Current position / round	Final position / round	First match	Last match
Persian Gulf Pro League	30 July 2015	_	4th	31 July 2015	May 2016
Hazfi Cup	Round of 32	_	Semi-Final	11 September 2015	
AFC Champions League	Group-Stage	_	Round of 16	24 February 2016	3 May 2016

Source: Competitions

=== Competition record ===
Competition	Record							
Competition	G	W	D	L	GF	GA	GD	Win %
Persian Gulf Pro League	30	13	12	5	43	27	+16	43.33
Hazfi Cup	4	3	0	1	7	3	+4	75.00
AFC Champions League	8	5	0	3	14	8	+6	62.50
Total	42	21	12	9	64	38	+26	50.00

=== Persian Gulf Pro League ===
==== Standings ====
Pos	Team	Pld	W	D	L	GF	GA	GD	Pts	Qualification or relegation
2	Persepolis	30	16	9	5	50	34	+16	57	Qualification for the 2017 AFC Champions League group stage
3	Esteghlal	30	13	13	4	43	28	+15	52	Qualification for the 2017 AFC Champions League qualifying play-offs
4	Tractor Sazi	30	13	12	5	43	27	+16	51	
5	Naft Tehran	30	13	10	7	30	21	+9	49	
6	Zob Ahan	30	11	13	6	38	26	+12	46	Qualification for the 2017 AFC Champions League group stage (Note: Zob Ahan secured qualification for the 2017 AFC Champions League through winning the 2015–16 Hazfi Cup.)

Updated to match(es) played on 13 May 2016. Source: IPL Stats
Rules for classification: 1) points; 2) goal difference; 3) number of goals scored.

=== Results summary ===
Overall								Home						Away					
Pld	W	D	L	GF	GA	GD	Pts	W	D	L	GF	GA	GD	W	D	L	GF	GA	GD
30	13	12	5	43	27	+16	51	5	8	2	24	15	+9	8	4	3	19	12	+7

Last updated: 25 September 2015.
Source: Ipl Stats

=== Results by round ===
Round	1	2	3	4	5	6	7	8	9	10	11	12	13	14	15	16	17	18	19	20	21	22	23	24	25	26	27	28	29	30
Ground	H	A	H	A	H	A	H	A	H	H	A	H	A	H	A	A	H	A	H	A	H	A	H	A	A	H	A	H	A	H
Result	D	W	D	L	D	D	L	W	W	D	L	D	W	D	W	W	D	D	L	D	W	D	W	W	W	D	L	W	W	W
Position	8	3	6	7	8	9	10	9	6	6	11	11	9	9	7	7	7	7	7	8	7	6	5	5	4	4	4	4	4	4

Updated to match(es) played on 25 September 2015. Source: "Ipl".
A = Away; H = Home; W = Win; D = Draw; L = Loss

=== Matches ===
Win Draw Loss Postponed

Date Round	Home	Score	Away	Location

31 July 2015 1	Tractor	0 – 0	Naft Tehran	Tabriz
15:30 DST+03:30			Nong (yellow card)	Stadium: Sahand; Attendance: 20,000

7 August 2015 2	Gostaresh	1 – 3	Tractor	Tabriz
18:30 DST+03:30	Shojaeian 85'		Khalilzadeh 12', 33'; S. Nariman Jahan 43'	Stadium: Sahand; Attendance: 6,500

14 August 2015 3	Tractor	1 – 1	Rah Ahan	Tabriz
18:30 DST+03:30	Rafiei 22'		Nasr Azadani 88'	Stadium: Sahand; Attendance: 10,000

21 August 2015 4	Padideh	1 – 0	Tractor	Mashhad
17:30 DST+03:30	Yousefi 86'			Stadium: Samen; Attendance: 2,000

26 August 2015 5	Tractor	0 – 0	Esteghlal Khuzestan	Tabriz
18:15 DST+03:30				Stadium: Sahand; Attendance: 7,000

15 September 2015 6	Sepahan	0 – 0	Tractor	Isfahan
17:30 DST+03:30				Stadium: Foolad Shahr; Attendance: 3,500

25 September 2015 7	Tractor	0 – 1	Persepolis	Tabriz
16:20 DST+03:30			Bengtson 71' (pen.)	Stadium: Sahand; Attendance: 20,000

16 October 2015 8	Foolad	1 – 2	Tractor	Ahvaz
17:10 DST+03:30	Khaledi 65'		Augusto 71'; Iranpourian 90' (pen.)	Stadium: Ghadir; Attendance: 1,200

20 October 2015 9	Tractor	2 – 0	Saipa	Tabriz
16:00 DST+03:30	Younés 26'; Rahmani 53'			Stadium: Sahand; Attendance: -

27 October 2015 10	Tractor	4 – 4	Zob Ahan	Tabriz
15:30 DST+03:30	Rafiei 16'; Rahmani 45'; Saghebi 55'; Rahmani 75'		Rafiei 27'; Tabrizi 81'; Rezaei 86'; Esmaeilifar 90+4'	Stadium: Sahand; Attendance: 2,500

31 October 2015 11	Saba Qom	2 – 1	Tractor	Qom
15:30 DST+03:30	Cardoso 16' (o.g.); Eslami 41'		Younés 29'	Stadium: Yadegar-e Emam Qom; Attendance: 1,500

20 November 2015 12	Tractor	0 – 0	Siah Jamegan	Tabriz
15:15 DST+03:30				Stadium: Sahand; Attendance: 9,500

30 November 2015 13	Malavan	0 – 1	Tractor	Bandar-e Anzali
15:15 DST+03:30			Younés 84'	Stadium: Takhti Anzali; Attendance: 5,000

13 December 2015 14	Tractor	0 – 0	Esteghlal	Tabriz
15:00 (DST+03:30)		report		Stadium: Sahand; Attendance: 7,000; Referee: Mohsen Ghahremani

17 December 2015 15	Esteghlal Ahvaz	0 – 2	Tractor	Ahvaz
15:00 DST+03:30			Hamoudi 3'; Saghebi 90+2'	Stadium: Takhti Ahvaz; Attendance: 1,500

28 December 2015 16	Naft Tehran	0 – 1	Tractor	Tehran
15:00 DST+03:30			Aghaei 45+1'	Stadium: Takhti Tehran; Attendance: 1,000

1 January 2016 17	Tractor	1–1	Gostaresh	Tabriz
14:30 DST+03:30				Stadium: Sahand; Attendance: 2000

=== Hazfi Cup ===
Win Draw Loss Postponed

Date Round	Home	Score	Away	Location

11 September 2015 Round of 32	Tractor	3 – 0 (w/o)	Be'sat Kermanshah	Tabriz
				Stadium: Sahand
Note: Be'sat Kermanshah withdrew

20 September 2015 Round of 16	Saba Qom	0 – 1	Tractor	Qom
			Younés 81' (pen.)	Stadium: Yadegar-e Emam Stadium; Attendance: 1,500

4 November 2015 Quarter-Final (1/4 Final - Last 8)	Saipa	1 – 2	Tractor	Tehran
15:00 (DST+03:30)	A. Zeinali 34'	report	H. Younés 8'; S. Saghebi 66'	Stadium: Shahid Dastgerdi; Attendance: 400

22 December 2015 Semi-Final (1/2 Final - Last 4)	Tractor	1 – 2	Esteghlal	Tabriz
14:30 (DST+03:30)	Augusto 49'	report	Shahbazzadeh 29', 52'	Stadium: Yadegar-e Emam Stadium; Attendance: 15,000; Referee: Hossein Zargar

=== Group C ===
Pos	Team	Pld	W	D	L	GF	GA	GD	Pts	Qualification
1	(Iran) Tractor Sazi	6	4	0	2	10	3	+7	12	Advance to knockout stage
2	(Saudi Arabia) Al-Hilal	6	3	2	1	10	7	+3	11	Advance to knockout stage
3	(Uzbekistan) Pakhtakor	6	3	1	2	10	9	+1	10	
4	(United Arab Emirates) Al-Jazira	6	0	1	5	2	13	−11	1	

Source: AFC

Date Round	Home	Score	Away	Location

Win Draw Loss Postponed

24 February 2016 1	Tractor (Iran)	4–0	(United Arab Emirates) Al-Jazira	Yadegar-e-Emam Stadium, Tabriz
	Rahmani 4', 60'; Khalilzadeh 10'; Sharifi 54'	Report		Attendance: 13,452; Referee: Muhammad Taqi

2 March 2016 2	(United Arab Emirates) Al-Jazira	0–1	(Iran) Tractor	Mohammed Bin Zayed Stadium, Abu Dhabi
		Report	Rahmani 31'	Attendance: 6,820; Referee: Hettikamkanamge Perera

15 March 2016 3	Pakhtakor (Uzbekistan)	1–0	(Iran) Tractor	Pakhtakor Markaziy Stadium, Tashkent
	Sergeev 41'	Report		Attendance: 2,223; Referee: Kim Dong-jin

6 April 2016 4	Tractor (Iran)	2–0	(Uzbekistan) Pakhtakor	Yadegar-e Emam Stadium, Tabriz
	Augusto 59'; Aghaei 83'	Report		Attendance: 33,450; Referee: Yudai Yamamoto

19 April 2016 5	Al-Hilal (Saudi Arabia)	0–2	(Iran) Tractor	Suheim Bin Hamad Stadium, Doha
		Report	Nong 66'; Hatami 81'	Attendance: 2,642; Referee: Peter Green

3 May 2016 6	Tractor (Iran)	1–2	Al-Hilal (Saudi Arabia)	Sultan Qaboos Sports Complex, Muscat
	Nong 48'	Report	Al-Dawsari 15'; Aílton 71'	Attendance: 8,545; Referee: Kim Jong-hyeok

=== Round of 16 ===
17 May 2016 First leg	Al-Nasr (United Arab Emirates)	4–1	(Iran) Tractor	Al-Maktoum Stadium, Dubai
20:45 UTC+4	Al-Yassi 15'; Saleh 41', 77'; Khamees 89'	Report	Augusto 59'	Attendance: 6,700; Referee: Ryuji Sato (Japan)

24 May 2016 Second leg	Tractor (Iran)	3–1 (4 – 5 agg.)	(United Arab Emirates) Al-Nasr	Yadegar-e Emam Stadium, Tabriz
20:00 UTC+4:30	Hatami 47', 73'; Iranpourian 61'	Report	Saleh 16'	Attendance: 65,100; Referee: Muhammad Taqi (Singapore)

== Kit and sponsorship ==
Tractor is currently sponsored by the Hamrah-e Aval (Mobile Telecommunication Company) and also Javanane Khayer Foundation. They were previously sponsored by the Bank Sepah. In July 2014, the club signed a contract with Kelme, starting from 2014–15 season.

Years	Shirt sponsors
1970–2009	TMC
2007–2010	Bank Sepah
2009–2012	Hamrah-e Aval
2012–2014	Javanane Khayer Foundation
2013–	Aysan Tabriz
2014–	Hamrah-e Aval

Years	Kit manufacturers
1970–1974	Umbro
1974–2005	Puma
2005–2010	Daei Sport
2010–2013	Uhlsport
2013–2014	Merooj
2014–	Kelme
