= Mohsen Delir =

Iranian footballer

Mohammad Mohsen Delir
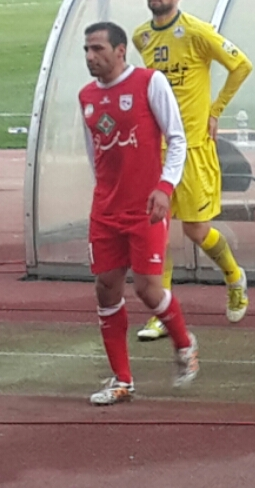
- Delir in 2014

Personal information
- Date of birth: 3 July 1988 (age 38)
- Place of birth: Marand, Iran
- Height: 1.80 m (5 ft 11 in)
- Position: Forward

Team information
- Current team: Sepidrood Rasht
- Number: 21

Youth career
- 2008–2010: Gostaresh

Senior career*
| Years | Team | Apps | (Gls) |
| 2009–2015 | Gostaresh | 42 | (13) |
| 2011–2012 | → Machine Sazi (loan) | 14 | (4) |
| 2013–2015 | → Tractor Sazi (loan) | 22 | (7) |
| 2015 | Siah Jamegan | 11 | (0) |
| 2015–2016 | Machine Sazi | 15 | (5) |
- * Club domestic league appearances and goals as of 28 June 2016

Mohammad Mohsen Delir (Persian: محمد محسن دلیر, born 3 July 1988 in Marand) is an Iranian footballer who currently plays for Machine Sazi.

== Club career ==
=== Gostaresh Foolad ===
Delir is a youth product of Gostaresh. He joined the newly found team in 2008 and was promoted to the first team in March 2009 and played in 2010 Hazfi Cup Final against Persepolis.

=== Loan to Machine Sazi ===
He was then loaned to Machine Sazi for the 2011–12 season, where he worked under head coach Rasoul Khatibi. They missed Iran Pro League promotion in the final week, and Delir was returned to Gostaresh at the end of the season after he scored four goals in 14 matches.

=== Return to Gostaresh ===
He worked again with Khatibi for the next season and led Gostaresh to promotion after scoring 10 goals in 20 matches. He was his team's top scorer.

=== Tractor Sazi ===
He joined Tractor Sazi on 1 July 2013 and signed a four-year contract. He played just one game in 2013–14 season and was a substitute player in Tractor Sazi's match against Lekhwiya in AFC Champions League where he played 34th minute. He began 2014–15 season under new head coach Rasoul Khatibi, his coach at his former teams. He scored five goals in the next nine matches and placed second in Iran Pro League's top-scorers after his team-mate Edinho, who scored 7 goals.

=== Siah Jamegan ===
After serving his two-year conscription at Tractor Sazi Delir returned to Gostaresh in the summer of 2015. He was sold to Siah Jamegan before the start of the season.

== Club career statistics ==
As of 2 December 2014.

| Club | Division | Season | League | | Hazfi Cup | | Asia | | Total | |
| Club | Division | Season | Apps | Goals | Apps | Goals | Apps | Goals | Apps | Goals |
|---|---|---|---|---|---|---|---|---|---|---|
| Gostaresh | Division 1 | 2009–10 | 5 | 3 | 6 | 2 | – | – | 11 | 5 |
| Gostaresh | Division 1 | 2010–11 | 17 | 0 | 1 | 0 | – | – | 18 | 0 |
| → Machine Sazi | Division 1 | 2011–12 | 14 | 4 | 0 | 0 | – | – | 14 | 4 |
| Gostaresh | Division 1 | 2012–13 | 20 | 10 | 0 | 0 | – | – | 20 | 10 |
| Tractor Sazi | Pro League | 2013–14 | 1 | 0 | 2 | 0 | 1 | 0 | 4 | 7 |
| Tractor Sazi | Pro League | 2014–15 | 16 | 6 | 2 | 0 | 0 | 0 | 18 | 7 |
| Career Totals | | | 72 | 23 | 11 | 2 | 1 | 0 | 84 | 25 |

== Honours ==
Gostaresh

- Azadegan League (1): 2012–13

Tractor Sazi

- Hazfi Cup (1): 2013–14
