= Ahmad Abdollahzadeh =

Iranian football midfielder

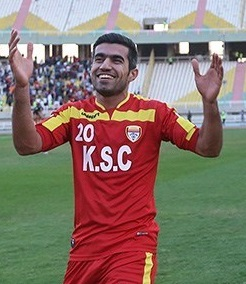

Personal information
- Date of birth: 6 May 1993 (age 33)
- Place of birth: Shush, Iran
- Height: 1.76 m (5 ft 9 1/2 in)
- Position: Midfielder

Youth career
- 2007–2012: Foolad

Senior career*
Years	Team	Apps	(Gls)
2012–2018	Foolad	70	(0)
2015–2016	→ Tractor (loan)	11	(0)
2018	Sanat Naft	3	(0)
2018–2019	Nassaji Mazandaran	25	(0)
2019–2023	Foolad	65	(4)
2023	Nassaji Mazandaran	8	(0)
2023–2024	Esteghlal Khuzestan	0	(0)
2024–2025	Sanat Naft	0	(0)

International career^{‡}
2008–2010	Iran U17	12	(2)
2011–2012	Iran U20	15	(3)
2017–2018	Iran	5	(0)
- * Club domestic league appearances and goals as of 6 May 2025 ‡ National team caps and goals as of 17 March 2018

Ahmad Abdollahzadeh (Persian: احمد عبدالله‌زاده; born 6 May 1993) is an Iranian football midfielder who plays for Sanat Naft in Azadegan League.

== Club career ==
=== Foolad ===
Abdollahzadeh started his career with Foolad in his teenage years. Later, he was placed on the first team by Majid Jalali. He made his debut for Foolad in the first fixture of the 2014–15 season against Tractor as a starter.

== Club career statistics ==
As of 22 December 2018.

Club	Division	Season	League		Hazfi Cup		Asia		Total	
Club	Division	Season	Apps	Goals	Apps	Goals	Apps	Goals	Apps	Goals
Foolad	Pro League	2011–12	2	0	0	0	–	–	2	0
Foolad	Pro League	2012–13	0	0	0	0	–	–	0	0
Foolad	Pro League	2013–14	0	0	0	0	0	0	0	0
Foolad	Pro League	2014–15	15	0	1	0	0	0	16	0
Tractor	Pro League	2015–16	11	0	1	0	0	0	12	0
Foolad	Pro League	2015–16	0	0	0	0	–	–	0	0
Foolad	Pro League	2016-17	28	0	2	0	–	–	30	0
Foolad	Pro League	2017-18	17	0	1	0	–	–	18	0
Nasaji	Pro League	2018-19	7	0	0	0	–	–	7	0
Career Totals			80	0	5	0	0	0	85	0

== International career ==
=== Youth ===
He played two matches at the 2010 AFC U-16 Championship. He was also part of the U-20 team during the 2012 AFC U-19 Championship.

=== Senior ===
On 3 October 2014, he was invited to the Iran national football team by Carlos Queiroz for the upcoming camp in Portugal. He made his debut against Togo on 5 October 2017. In May 2018, he was named in Iran's preliminary squad for the 2018 World Cup in Russia but did not make it to the final 23.

== Honors ==
=== Club ===
Foolad

- Iran Pro League (1): 2013–14
- Hazfi Cup (1): 2020–21
- Iranian Super Cup: 2021
