= Mohammad Pour Rahmatollah =

Iranian Football Midfielder (born 1995)

Personal information
- Full name: Mohammad Pour Rahmatollah Fotmeh Sari
- Date of birth: 1 January 1995 (age 31)
- Place of birth: Bandar-e Anzali, Iran
- Height: 1.82 m (6 ft 0 in)
- Position: Midfielder

Team information
- Current team: Sardar Maklavan
- Number: 6

Youth career
- 2005–2007: Esteghlal Anzali
- 2007–2014: Malavan
- 2014–2016: Tractor Sazi

Senior career*
Years	Team	Apps	(Gls)
2013–2019	Malavan	35	(1)
2014–2016	→ Tractor Sazi (loan)	2	(0)
2019–2020	Chooka Talesh		
2020–2021	Shahrdari Bandar Anzali		
2021–	Sardar Maklavan		
- * Club domestic league appearances and goals as of 30 April 2019

Mohammad Pour Rahmatollah Fotmeh Sari (Persian: محمد پوررحمت‌الله; born 1 January 1995) is an Iranian football midfielder who plays for Sardar Maklavan.

== Club career ==
=== Malavan ===
He started his career with Esteghlal Anzali U12. Later he joined the Malavan Academy and spent 7 seasons with Malavan youth levels. He was called to the first team by Dragan Skočić and made his debut in 2013–14 Iran Pro League against Gostaresh Foulad as a starter.

=== Tractor Sazi ===
Pour Rahmatollah joined Tractor Sazi in summer 2014 with a two-years contract while he was contracted with Malavan. However, Tractor Sazi announced that he and Shahin Saghebi joined the club to spend their conscription period.

== Club career statistics ==
As of 10 April 2014.

Club	Division	Season	League		Hazfi Cup		Asia		Total	
Club	Division	Season	Apps	Goals	Apps	Goals	Apps	Goals	Apps	Goals
Malavan	Pro League	2013–14	12	0	2	0	–	–	14	0
Tractor Sazi	Pro League	2014–15	0	0	0	0	0	0	0	0
Career Totals			12	0	2	0	0	0	14	0

== International career ==
=== U20 ===
He was invited to Iran U–20 by Ali Dousti Mehr to preparation for 2014 AFC U-19 Championship.
