= Leonard Mesarić =

Croatian footballer

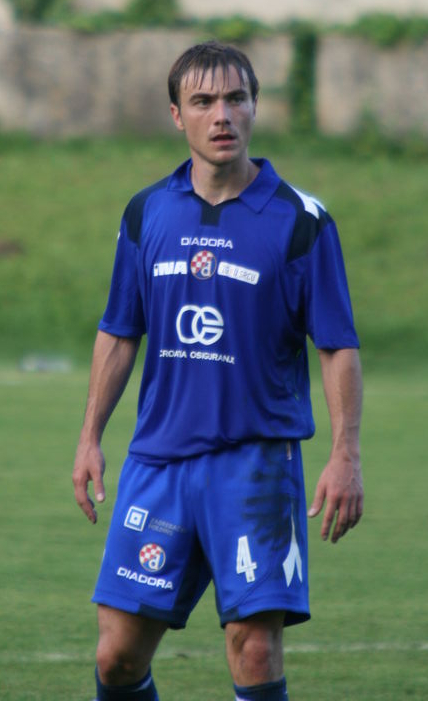
- Mesarić in spring 2010

Personal information
- Date of birth: 10 August 1983 (age 43)
- Place of birth: Zagreb, SFR Yugoslavia
- Height: 1.80 m (5 ft 11 in)
- Position: Defender

Youth career
- NK Zagreb

Senior career*
Years	Team	Apps	(Gls)
2001–2002	TŠK Topolovac	11	(0)
2002–2003	Croatia Sesvete		
2004–2005	Karlovac	17	(0)
2006	Segesta	10	(0)
2006–2007	Pula	0	(0)
2007–2008	Karlovac	16	(3)
2008–2010	Lokomotiva	53	(6)
2010–2011	Dinamo Zagreb	11	(1)
2011–2014	Lokomotiva	74	(6)
2014–2016	Foolad	52	(1)
2016–2020	Rudeš	61	(2)

International career^{‡}
2001	Croatia U18	2	(0)
2001	Croatia U19	2	(0)
- * Club domestic league appearances and goals as of 27 October 2022 ‡ National team caps and goals as of 30 August 2010

Leonard Mesarić (pronounced [lɛ̌ːɔnar̩d mɛsariːtɕ]; born 10 August 1983) is a Croatian retired footballer who last played for NK Rudeš.

With Dinamo Zagreb he won the 2010 Croatian Supercup which was his first honour of the career. Before joining the Croatian champions, Mesarić played for TŠK Topolovac, Karlovac, Segesta and NK Lokomotiva. He also represented Croatia national team at the under-18 and under-19 levels.

== Club career ==
Mesarić started his career at TŠK Topolovac. The club was competing in the Prva HNL and Mesarić made a total of 11 appearances throughout the season. TŠK Topolovac finished last and was relegated. He continued his career playing for the second and third-tier clubs Karlovac and Segesta. He made a total of 33 appearances for Karlovac and scored 3 goals, while for Segesta he played 10 matches. On 21 January 2007 he gets signed by NK Lokomotiva. Mesarić won two consecutive promotions with the new club and the Zagreb club found itself playing in the Prva HNL for the 2009–10 season. In Prva HNL he made 12 appearances and scored 1 goal for Lokomotiva before he was transferred to Dinamo Zagreb on 26 June 2009.

On 27 July 2014, Mesarić signed a one-year contract with Iranian champions Foolad.

== Outside football ==
Mesarić is alumnus of the Faculty of Humanities and Social Sciences in Zagreb, graduating two double major programs, Pedagogy and Information science. He also performs in the theatre and speaks five languages.

== Career statistics ==
As of 28 August 2016

Club	Season	League	
Club	Season	Apps	Goals
TŠK Topolovac	2001–02	11	0
Karlovac	2005–06	17	0
Segesta	2005–06	10	0
Karlovac	2006–07	0	0
Karlovac	2007–08	16	3
Lokomotiva	2007–08	14	2
Lokomotiva	2008–09	27	3
Lokomotiva	2009–10	12	1
Dinamo Zagreb	2010–11	11	1
Foolad	2014–15	28	1
Foolad	2015–16	12	0
Total		158	11

== Honours ==
- Croatian First League (1): 2010–11
- Croatian Cup (1): 2010–11
- Croatian Super Cup (1): 2010
