= Augusto César (footballer, born 1992) =

Brazilian footballer

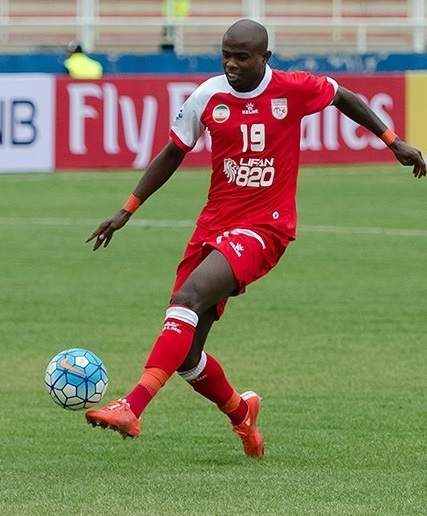

Personal information
- Full name: Augusto César dos Santos Moreira
- Date of birth: 6 August 1992 (age 34)
- Place of birth: Porto Alegre, Brazil
- Height: 1.78 m (5 ft 10 in)
- Position: Midfielder

Team information
- Current team: Matsumoto Yamaga
- Number: 21

Youth career
- 2008–2012: Internacional

Senior career*
Years	Team	Apps	(Gls)
2011–2017	Internacional	14	(0)
2013	→ Chapecoense (loan)	22	(0)
2014	→ Sport (loan)	15	(1)
2015	→ Joinville (loan)	24	(1)
2015–2016	→ Tractor (loan)	25	(2)
2016	→ Emirates Club (loan)	3	(0)
2017–2018	Sanat Naft Abadan	28	(5)
2018	Querétaro	0	(0)
2019	Chapecoense	19	(2)
2020–	Matsumoto Yamaga	12	(0)

International career
2011	Brazil U20		
- * Club domestic league appearances and goals as of 19:34, 8 December 2020 (UTC)

Augusto César dos Santos Moreira (born 6 August 1992 in Porto Alegre), known as Augusto César or just Augusto, is a Brazilian footballer who plays for Matsumoto Yamaga FC.

== Club career ==
=== Tractor ===
In the summer of 2015 Augusto César joined Persian Gulf Pro League club Tractor on a one–year loan from Brazilian club Internacional. He scored his first goal for Tractor on 16 October 2015 in a 2–1 victory over Foolad.

== Honours ==
Internacional

- Campeonato Gaúcho: 2011, 2012, 2013, 2014
- Recopa Sudamericana: 2011

Chapecoense

Runner-up:

- Série B: 2013

Runner-up:

- Campeonato Catarinense: 2013

Recife

- Campeonato Pernambucano: 2014

Joinville

- Campeonato Catarinense: 2015
