= Mehrdad Bayrami =

Iranian footballer

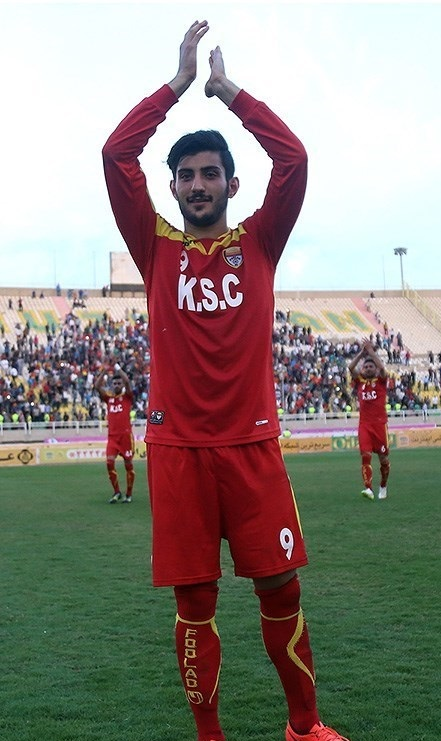

Personal information
- Full name: Mehrdad Bayrami Mirni
- Date of birth: 21 September 1990 (age 36)
- Place of birth: Ardabil, Iran
- Height: 1.77 m (5 ft 9 1/2 in)
- Position: Forward

Team information
- Current team: Paykan
- Number: 27

Youth career
- 2000–2005: Inter Campus
- 2005–2011: Persepolis

Senior career*
Years	Team	Apps	(Gls)
2011–2012	Machine Sazi	16	(1)
2012–2014	Gostaresh Foulad	42	(14)
2014–2015	Tractor	21	(1)
2015–2016	Foolad	9	(0)
2016–2017	Machine Sazi	10	(1)
2017	Saba Qom	12	(1)
2017–2018	Machine Sazi	22	(0)
2018–2019	Sepidrood	25	(6)
2019–2020	Gol Gohar Sirjan	23	(0)
2020–2021	Nassaji	14	(0)
2021–2022	Shahr Khodro	24	(1)
2022	Aluminium Arak	11	(1)
2023	Saipa	2	(0)
2023–2024	Paykan	11	(0)
2024	Khooshe Talaee	7	(0)
2024–2025	Damash Gilan	16	(1)
2025–	Paykan	5	(0)
- * Club domestic league appearances and goals as of 21 April 2025

Mehrdad Bayrami Mirni (Persian: مهرداد بایرامی; born 21 September 1990) an Iranian professional football player who plays for Paykan in the Azadegan League.

== Club career ==
=== Club career statistics ===
As of 17 December 2015

Club performance			League		Cup		Continental		Total	
Season	Club	League	Apps	Goals	Apps	Goals	Apps	Goals	Apps	Goals
Iran			League		Hazfi Cup		Asia		Total	
2011–12	Machine Sazi	Division 1	16	1	2	0	–	–	18	1
2012–13	Gostaresh	Division 1	22	6	0	0	–	–	22	6
2013–14	Gostaresh	PGPL	28	14	1	0	–	–	29	14
2014–15	Gostaresh	PGPL	13	2	1	2	–	–	14	4
2014–15	Tractor	PGPL	11	1	0	0	4	1	15	1
2015–16	Tractor	PGPL	10	0	1	0	0	0	10	0
2015–16	Foolad	PGPL	13	0	0	0	–	–	13	0
Career total			113	24	5	2	4	1	122	27

- Assist Goals

Season	Team	Assists
13–14	Gostaresh	5
14–15	Gostaresh	0
