= Mohammad Iranpourian =

Iranian footballer

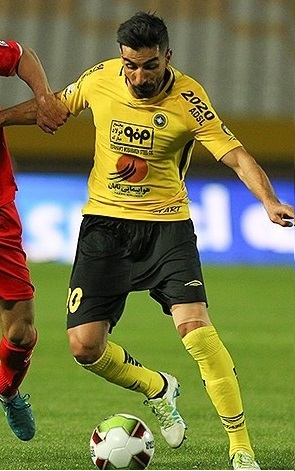

Personal information
- Full name: Mohammad Iranpourian
- Date of birth: 21 September 1985 (age 41)
- Place of birth: Sepidan County, Iran
- Height: 1.81 m (5 ft 11 1/2 in)
- Position: Right-back

Youth career
- 2004–2007: Mersad

Senior career*
Years	Team	Apps	(Gls)
2007–2008	Mersad	7	(2)
2008–2010	Fajr Sepasi	45	(5)
2010–2012	Shahrdari Tabriz	25	(2)
2012–2018	Tractor	132	(22)
2018–2020	Sepahan	23	(2)
2020–2021	Aluminium Arak	17	(0)
- * Club domestic league appearances and goals

Mohammad Iranpourian (born 21 September 1985) is an Iranian former football player.

== Career ==
Iranpourian joined Moghavemat Sepasi in 2008.

=== Tractor ===
In 2012, he joined Tractor and was named club captain in 2015. In May 2015 he finished runners–up in the Persian Gulf Pro League with the club.

=== Club career statistics ===
As of 28 May 2018

Club performance			League		Cup		Continental		Total	
Season	Club	League	Apps	Goals	Apps	Goals	Apps	Goals	Apps	Goals
Iran			League		Hazfi Cup		Asia		Total	
2007–08	Mersad	Azadegan League	7	2	0	0	-	-	7	2
2008–09	Moghavemat	Iran Pro League	15	1	0	0	-	-	15	1
2009–10	Moghavemat	Iran Pro League	30	4	0	0	-	-	30	4
2010–11	Shahrdari Tabriz	Iran Pro League	5	0	0	0	-	-	5	0
2011–12	Shahrdari Tabriz	Iran Pro League	20	2	1	0	-	-	21	2
2012–13	Tractor	Iran Pro League	18	0	2	0	6	0	26	0
2013–14	Tractor	Iran Pro League	12	0	3	0	0	0	15	0
2014–15	Tractor	Iran Pro League	22	3	1	0	3	0	26	3
2015–16	Tractor	Iran Pro League	26	7	2	0	7	1	35	8
2016–17	Tractor	Iran Pro League	27	6	6	2	-	-	33	8
2017–18	Tractor	Iran Pro League	27	6	3	1	5	1	35	8
2018–19	Sepahan	Iran Pro League	22	2	2	0	-	-	24	2
2019–20	Sepahan	Iran Pro League	1	0	0	0	0	0	1	0
Career total			233	33	20	3	21	2	273	38

- Assist Goals

Season	Team	Assists
10–11	Shahrdari Tabriz	0
11–12	Shahrdari Tabriz	1
12–13	Tractor	1
13–14	Tractor	2
14–15	Tractor	1
15–16	Tractor	4
16–17	Tractor	5
17–18	Tractor	4
18–19	Sepahan	4

== Honours ==
=== Club ===
Tractor

- Iran Pro League : 2012–13 Runner up, 2014–15 Runner-up
- Hazfi Cup (1) : 2013–14

=== Individual ===
- Persian Gulf Pro League Team of the Season (1) : 2016-17
