= Shahin Saghebi =

Iranian footballer (born 1993)

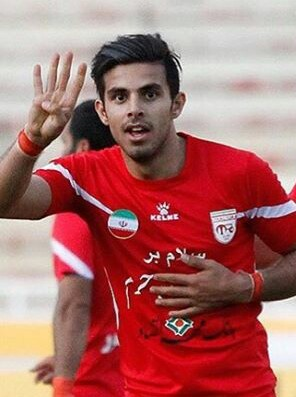
- Saghebi with Tractor in 2014

Personal information
- Full name: Shahin Saghebi
- Date of birth: 25 August 1993 (age 33)
- Place of birth: Ardabil, Iran
- Height: 1.78 m (5 ft 10 in)
- Positions: Attacking midfielder; winger

Youth career
- 2007–2013: Malavan

Senior career*
Years	Team	Apps	(Gls)
2011–2017	Malavan	58	(9)
2014–2016	→ Tractor (loan)	46	(6)
2017–2018	Sepahan	12	(1)
2018–2019	Paykan	28	(2)
2019–2020	Machine Sazi	19	(2)
2021	Nassaji Mazandaran	2	(1)
2021–2023	Tractor	19	(0)

International career^{‡}
2014–2016	Iran U23	13	(1)
- * Club domestic league appearances and goals as of 3 April 2022 ‡ National team caps and goals as of 22 January 2016

Shahin Saghebi (Persian: شاهین ثاقبی) is an Iranian footballer who plays for Tractor in the Persian Gulf Pro League.

== Club career ==
=== Malavan ===
Saghebi played his entire career in Malavan. He scored his first goal for Malavan against Mes Rafsanjan on 29 October 2013 in the Hazfi Cup. His first league goal was against Malavan's arch-rivals Damash in El Gilano, ensuring Malavan's historic 3–0 win in Rasht. He scored the third goal of Malavan's 4–2 win over Esteghlal on 19 February 2014.

=== Tractor ===
Saghebi joined Tractor in summer 2014 with a two-year contract while he was contracted with Malavan. However Tractor later announced that he and Mohammad Pour Rahmatollah joined Tractor to spend their conscription period.

=== Statistics ===
As of 7 April 2015.

Club	Division	Season	League		Hazfi Cup		Asia		Total	
Club	Division	Season	Apps	Goals	Apps	Goals	Apps	Goals	Apps	Goals
Malavan	Pro League	2011–12	0	0	0	0	–	–	0	0
Malavan	Pro League	2012–13	4	0	0	0	–	–	4	0
Malavan	Pro League	2013–14	23	4	2	1	–	–	25	5
Tractor	Pro League	2014–15	24	2	1	1	4	1	28	4
Tractor	Pro League	2015–16	14	2	1	0	0	0	15	2
Malavan	Azadegan League	2016–17	31	5					31	5
Sepahan	Pro League	2017–18	13	1	1	0	0	0	14	1
Career Total			109	9	5	2	4	1	118	12

== International career ==
=== U23 ===
He invited to Iran U-23 training camp by Nelo Vingada to preparation for Incheon 2014 and 2016 AFC U-22 Championship (Summer Olympic qualification).

=== Senior ===
Saghebi was called up by Carlos Queiroz to Iranian national team on 7 November 2014 for upcoming friendly match with South Korea.
