= Fardin Abedini =

Iranian footballer

Personal information
- Full name: Fardin Abedini
- Date of birth: 18 November 1991 (age 35)
- Place of birth: Tabriz, Iran
- Positions: Right back; midfielder

Team information
- Current team: Aluminium Arak
- Number: 22

Youth career
- 2006–2010: Esteghlal

Senior career*
Years	Team	Apps	(Gls)
2010–2013	Esteghlal	15	(0)
2011–2013	→ Tractor (loan)	7	(1)
2013–2014	Gostaresh Foolad	10	(1)
2014–2015	Mes Kerman	12	(1)
2015–2016	Tractor	11	(0)
2016–2017	Machine Sazi	9	(0)
2017–2018	Aluminium Arak F.C.		
2018–2019	Sanat Naft Abadan F.C.	12	(0)
2019–	Machine Sazi F.C.	15	(3)

International career
2010	Iran U23	1	(0)
- * Club domestic league appearances and goals as of 5 March 2015

Fardin Abedini (Persian: فردین عابدینی; born November 18, 1991 in Tabriz, Iran) is an Iranian football defender.

== Club career ==
He made his professional debut for Esteghlal during the 2010–11 season. He was then loaned to Tractor and played two seasons there, although he missed his final season due to a serious injury. He returned to Esteghlal ahead of the 2013–14 season.

== Honours ==
=== Club ===
- Iran's Premier Football League
  - Runner up: 3
    - 2010–11 with Esteghlal
    - 2011–12 with Tractor
    - 2012–13 with Tractor
    - 2014–15 with Tractor
