= Mojtaba Roshangar =

Iranian footballer

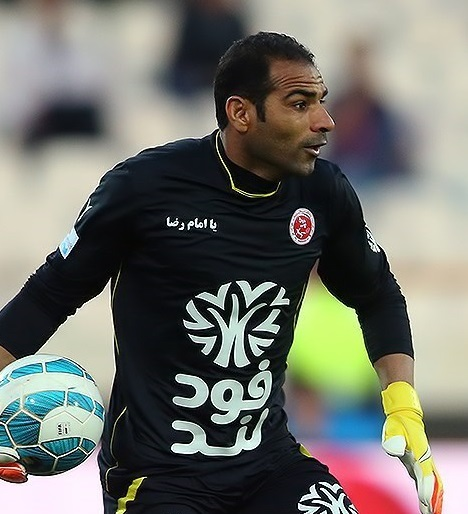

Personal information
- Full name: Mojtaba Roshangar
- Date of birth: 31 October 1981 (age 45)
- Place of birth: Rudan, Iran
- Position: Goalkeeper

Team information
- Current team: Baadraan
- Number: 1

Senior career*
Years	Team	Apps	(Gls)
2008–2011	Shahin Bushehr	16	(0)
2011–2013	Aluminium Hormozgan	19	(0)
2013–2017	Padideh	65	(0)
2017–2018	Nassaji Mazandaran	34	(0)
2018–2019	Baadraan	17	(0)
- * Club domestic league appearances and goals as of 11 December 2014

Mojtaba Roshangar (Persian: مجتبی روشنگر; born October 31, 1981) is an Iranian footballer who currently plays for Nassaji Mazandaran in Azadegan League

== Club career ==
Roshangar played for Shahin Bushehr from 2008 to 2011.
