= Habib Gordani =

Iranian footballer (born 1983)

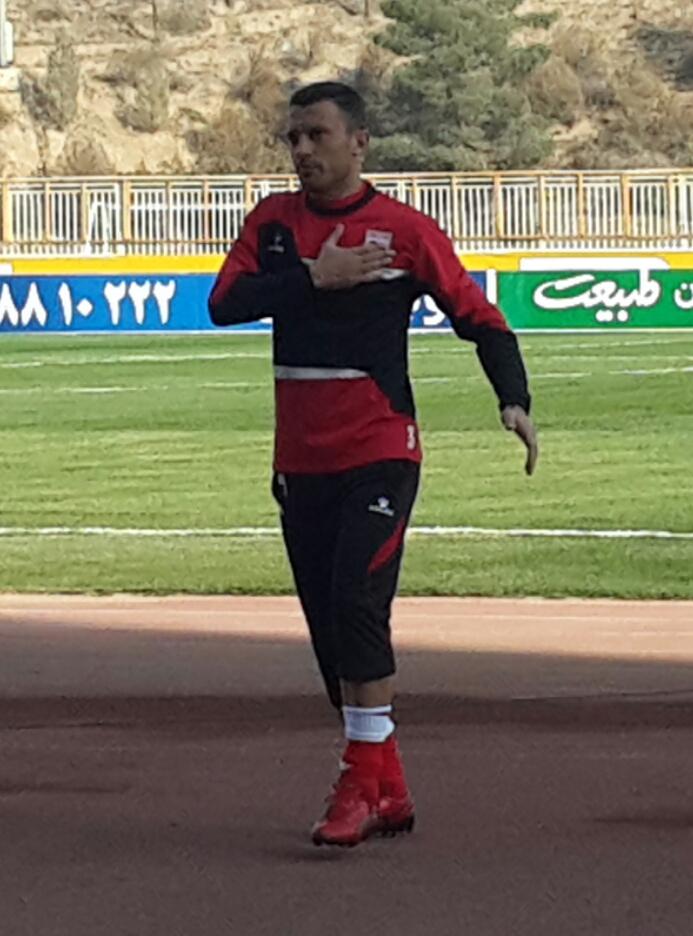
- Habib Gordani with Tractor Sazi in 2014

Personal information
- Full name: Habib Gordani
- Date of birth: 9 June 1983 (age 43)
- Place of birth: Tabriz, Iran
- Height: 1.66 m (5 ft 5 1/2 in)
- Position: Left back

Team information
- Current team: Machine Sazi
- Number: 33

Youth career
- 2005–2007: Shahrdari Tabriz

Senior career*
| Years | Team | Apps | (Gls) |
| 2007–2012 | Shahrdari Tabriz | 102 | (4) |
| 2012–2015 | Tractor Sazi | 63 | (4) |
| 2015–2016 | Sepahan | 22 | (0) |
| 2016–2017 | Machine Sazi | 18 | (0) |
| 2021– | Machine Sazi | 1 | (0) |

International career^{‡}
| 2005 | Iran U23 | 4 | (1) |
- * Club domestic league appearances and goals as of 3 August 2016 ‡ National team caps and goals as of 27 May 2016

Habib Gordani (born June 9, 1983) is an Iranian footballer.

== Club career ==
Gordani has been with Shahrdari Tabriz since 2007. He signed with Tractor Sazi in 2012. He has played his entire career in the city of Tabriz. In 2014 Gordani won the Hazfi Cup with Tractor Sazi.

=== Sepahan ===
In the summer of 2015 after being released by Tractor Sazi, Gordani signed a two-year contract with Sepahan on 5 July 2015.

| Club performance | | | League | | Cup | | Continental | | Total | |
| Season | Club | League | Apps | Goals | Apps | Goals | Apps | Goals | Apps | Goals |
| Iran | | | League | | Hazfi Cup | | Asia | | Total | |
|---|---|---|---|---|---|---|---|---|---|---|
| 2007–08 | Shahrdari Tabriz | Azadegan League | ? | 2 | | | - | - | | |
| 2008–09 | Shahrdari Tabriz | Azadegan League | ? | 1 | | | - | - | | |
| 2009–10 | Shahrdari Tabriz | Azadegan League | 22 | 0 | 0 | 0 | - | - | 22 | 0 |
| 2010–11 | Shahrdari Tabriz | Iran Pro League | 20 | 1 | 1 | 0 | - | - | 21 | 1 |
| 2011–12 | Shahrdari Tabriz | Iran Pro League | 14 | 2 | 0 | 0 | - | - | 14 | 2 |
| 2012–13 | Shahrdari Tabriz | Azadegan League | 10 | 4 | 0 | 0 | - | - | 10 | 4 |
| 2012–13 | Tractor Sazi | Iran Pro League | 23 | 2 | 0 | 0 | - | - | 23 | 2 |
| 2013–14 | Tractor Sazi | Iran Pro League | 21 | 2 | 2 | 0 | 0 | 0 | 23 | 2 |
| 2014–15 | Tractor Sazi | Iran Pro League | 17 | 0 | 1 | 1 | 0 | 0 | 18 | 1 |
| Total | Iran | | | 12 | 4 | 1 | 0 | 0 | | 13 |
| Career total | | | | 12 | 4 | 1 | 0 | 0 | | 13 |

== Honours ==
Tractor Sazi

- Hazfi Cup (1): 2013–14
