= Ahmad Hassanzadeh =

Iranian footballer (born 1985)

Personal information
- Full name: Ahmad Hassanzadeh
- Date of birth: 31 January 1985 (age 41)
- Place of birth: Kerman, Iran
- Height: 1.74 m (5 ft 9 in)
- Position: Midfielder

Team information
- Current team: Saba Qom
- Number: 70

Youth career
- 2006–2009: Mes Kerman

Senior career*
Years	Team	Apps	(Gls)
2009–2010	Mes Sarcheshme	26	(7)
2010–2014	Mes Kerman	76	(15)
2014–	Saba Qom	26	(8)
2014–2016	→ Fajr Sepasi (loan)	30	(7)

International career^{‡}
2012	Iran	4	(1)
- * Club domestic league appearances and goals as of 13 January 2017 ‡ National team caps and goals as of 15 December 2012

Ahmad Hassanzadeh (Persian: احمد حسن‌زاده; born January 31, 1985) is an Iranian footballer who plays for Saba Qom in the Persian Gulf Pro League.

== Club career ==
Hassanzadeh joined Mes Kerman in 2010 after spending the previous season at Mes Sarcheshme. After Mes Kerman's relegation to the Azadegan League, Hassanzadeh joined Saba Qom with signing a two-year contract.

Club performance			League		Cup		Continental		Total	
Season	Club	League	Apps	Goals	Apps	Goals	Apps	Goals	Apps	Goals
Iran			League		Hazfi Cup		Asia		Total	
2009–10	Mes Sarcheshme	Division 1	26	7	0	0	0	0	26	7
2010–11	Mes Kerman	Pro League	26	5	1	0	–		27	5
2011–12	Mes Kerman	Pro League	25	6	0	0	–		25	6
2012–13	Mes Kerman	Pro League	23	3	0	0	–		30	3
2013–14	Mes Kerman	Pro League	2	1	0	0	–		2	1
2014–15	Saba Qom	Pro League	7	4	0	0	–		7	4
Career total			109	26	1	0	0	0	110	26

- Assist Goals

Season	Team	Assists
10–11	Mes Kerman	1
11–12	Mes Kerman	2
12–13	Mes Kerman	0
13–14	Mes Kerman	0
14–15	Saba	0

== International career ==
He made his debut against Mauritania in April 2012 under Carlos Queiroz.

Scores and results list Iran's goal tally first.

#	Date	Venue	Opponent	Score	Result	Competition
1	6 November 2012	Azadi Stadium	Tajikistan	5–0	6–1	Friendly

== Honours ==
Mes Kerman

- Hazfi Cup Runner-up (1): 2013–14
