= Issa Ndoye =

Senegalese footballer

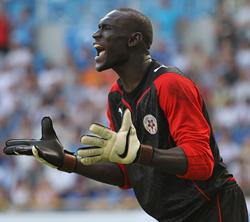
- Ndoye with Volyn Lutsk in July 2010

Personal information
- Date of birth: 12 December 1985 (age 40)
- Place of birth: Touba Toul, Thiès, Senegal
- Height: 2.02 m (6 ft 8 in)
- Position: Goalkeeper

Youth career
- 1999–2001: Mbaxaan de Thiès
- 2001–2004: ASC Jeanne d'Arc
- 2004–2005: Zob Ahan

Senior career*
Years	Team	Apps	(Gls)
2005–2009	Zob Ahan	60	(0)
2009–2011	Volyn Lutsk	39	(0)
2012–2013	Greuther Fürth	0	(0)
2013–2014	Créteil-Lusitanos	10	(0)
2014–2015	Tractor Sazi	3	(0)
2017	Slavia Mozyr	17	(0)
2018–2022	Mulhouse	66	(0)

International career
2007–2013	Senegal	2	(0)
- * Club domestic league appearances and goals as of 31 July 2022

Issa Ndoye (born 12 December 1985) is a Senegalese former professional football goalkeeper.

== Club career ==
Ndoye signed for Isfahan side Zob Ahan in 2005. After Iranian football league imposed a foreign goalkeepers ban, he moved to Ukraine. He was linked with Metalist Kharkiv first and had a short trial there. However, Ndoye then signed a two-year contract with Volyn Lutsk. He joined Tractor Sazi in December 2014.

== International career ==
Ndoye has previously played for Under-16, Under-17 and Under-21 Senegal National Teams.

Ndoye was announced as a part of the 38-man squad of the Senegal national football team in preparation for the 2008 African Cup of Nations. However, he was not selected for the tournament, with Bouna Coundoul being favoured to Ndoye.

== Career statistics ==
As of 4 December 2014

Appearances and goals by club, season and competition
Club	Season	League			Cup		Continental		Total	
Club	Season	Division	Apps	Goals	Apps	Goals	Apps	Goals	Apps	Goals
Zob Ahan	2005–06	Iran Pro League	0	0		0	–	–		0
Zob Ahan	2006–07	Iran Pro League	12	0		0	–	–		0
Zob Ahan	2007–08	Iran Pro League	19	0		0	–	–		0
Zob Ahan	2008–09	Iran Pro League	29	0		0	–	–		0
Zob Ahan	Total		60	0			0	0		
Volyn Lutsk	2009–10	First League	26	0	7	0	–	–	33	0
Volyn Lutsk	2010–11	Premier League	12	0	0	0	–	–	12	0
Volyn Lutsk	Total		38	0	7	0	0	0	45	0
Greuther Fürth	2012–13	2. Bundesliga	0	0	0	0	–	–	0	0
US Créteil	2013–14	Ligue 2	10	0	4	0	–	–	14	0
Tractor Sazi	2014–15	Persian Gulf Pro League	0	0	0	0	0	0	0	0
Career total			108	0	11	0	0	0		
