= Radamés (footballer) =

Brazilian footballer

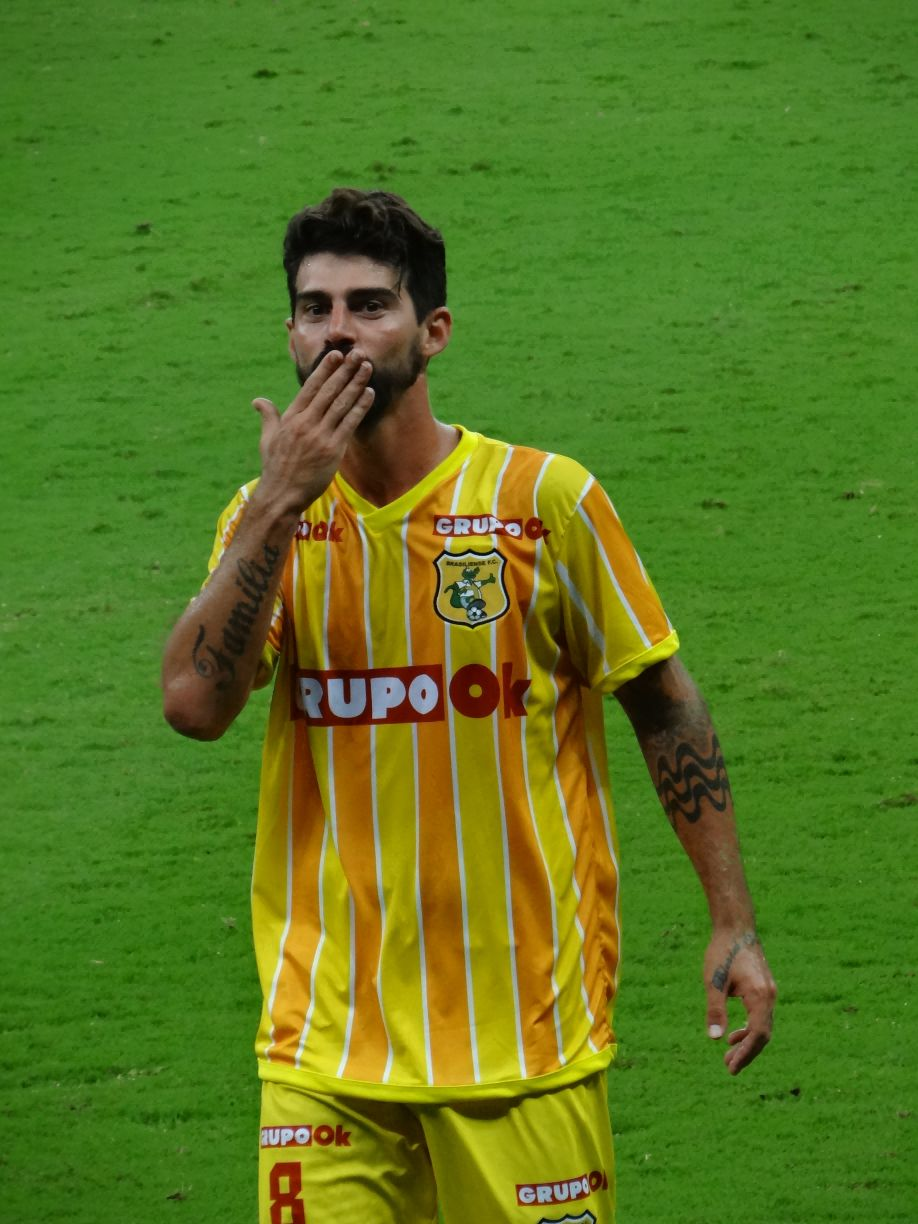
- Radamés in 2018.

Personal information
- Full name: Radamés Martins Rodrigues da Silva
- Date of birth: April 17, 1986 (age 40)
- Place of birth: Rio de Janeiro, Brazil
- Height: 1.80 m (5 ft 11 in)
- Position: Defensive midfielder

Team information
- Current team: Brasiliense

Youth career
- 2003–2004: Fluminense

Senior career*
Years	Team	Apps	(Gls)
2005–2009	Fluminense	29	(0)
2007	→ Juventude (loan)	5	(0)
2007–2008	→ Náutico (loan)	15	(1)
2009	→ Al-Jazira (loan)	0	(0)
2010	Botafogo-SP	4	(0)
2011	Volta Redonda	10	(0)
2012–2013	Boa Esporte	53	(8)
2013–2014	Vila Nova	28	(2)
2014	Tractor Sazi	0	(0)
2015	Paysandu	0	(0)
2015–	Boa Esporte	18	(1)
- * Club domestic league appearances and goals

Radamés Martins Rodrigues da Silva (born 17 April 1986), known as Radamés, is a Brazilian professional footballer who plays as a defensive midfielder for Brasiliense.

During the 2011 English close season, he had trials with Swansea City, Stoke City and Birmingham City.

== Contract ==
- Náutico (loan) 17 July 2007 to 31 December 2007
- Fluminense 1 August 2005 to 31 December 2008
