= Davoud Noushi Soufiani =

Iranian footballer

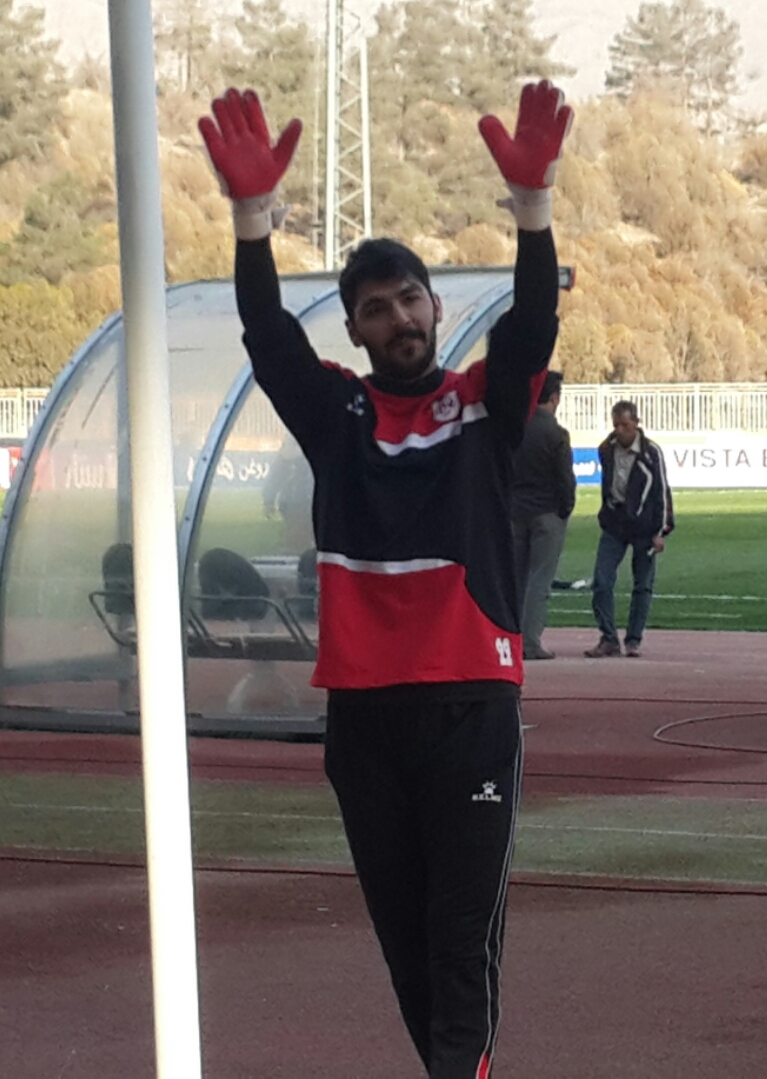

Personal information
- Date of birth: 15 July 1990 (age 36)
- Place of birth: Tabriz, Iran
- Height: 1.89 m (6 ft 2 1/2 in)
- Position: Goalkeeper

Team information
- Current team: Zob Ahan
- Number: 20

Youth career
- 2007–2008: Machine Sazi
- 2008–2010: Rah Ahan

Senior career*
Years	Team	Apps	(Gls)
2009–2010	Rah Ahan	0	(0)
2010–2012	Shahrdari Tabriz	17	(0)
2012–2014	Gostaresh Foulad	0	(0)
2013–2014	→ Tractor Sazi (loan)	5	(0)
2014–2015	Tractor Sazi	4	(0)
2015–2016	Gostaresh Foulad	22	(0)
2016–2017	Pars Jonoubi	11	(0)
2017–2018	Sanat Naft	14	(0)
2018–2019	Oxin Alborz	34	(0)
2019–2020	Mes Kerman	32	(0)
2020–2024	Mes Rafsanjan	48	(0)
2024–	Zob Ahan	28	(0)

International career^{‡}
2006	Iran U17	2	(0)
2008	Iran U20	6	(0)
- * Club domestic league appearances and goals as of 11 April 2025 ‡ National team caps and goals as of 14 August 2010

Davoud Noushi Soufiani (Persian: داود نوشی صوفیانی; born 15 July 1990) is an Iranian football goalkeeper who plays for Zob Ahan in Persian Gulf Pro League.

== Club career ==
Noshi joined Shahrdari Tabriz in 2010, after spending the previous season at Machine Sazi in the 2nd Division of Iranian Football.

Club performance			League		Cup		Continental		Total	
Season	Club	League	Apps	Goals	Apps	Goals	Apps	Goals	Apps	Goals
Iran			League		Hazfi Cup		Asia		Total	
2010–11	Shahrdari Tabriz	Persian Gulf Cup	8	0		0	–	–		0
Total	Iran		8	0		0	0	0		0
Career total			8	0		0	0	0		0

== International career ==
Noshi participated in the Iranian U-20 qualifying matches against Oman and India for the 2008 AFC U-19 Championship.

Noshi Also participated in the 2006 AFC Youth Championship.

== Honours ==
Tractor Sazi

- Hazfi Cup (1): 2013–14
