= Mirhani Hashemi =

Iranian footballer (born 1983)

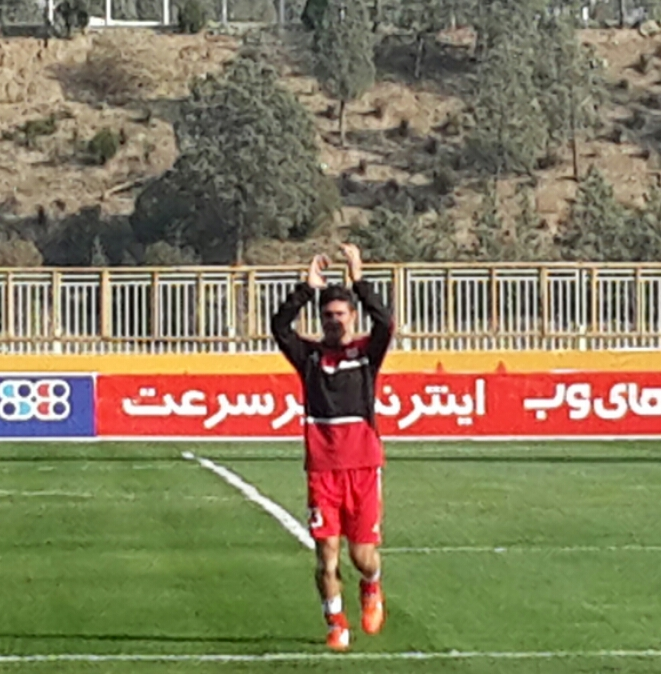
- Mirhani Hashemi in training with Tractor Sazi in 2014

Personal information
- Full name: Mirhani Hashemi
- Date of birth: 21 March 1983 (age 43)
- Place of birth: Sari, Iran
- Height: 1.81 m (5 ft 11 1/2 in)
- Position: Defender

Team information
- Current team: Oxin Alborz
- Number: 6

Youth career
- 2004–2005: Bargh Shiraz

Senior career*
Years	Team	Apps	(Gls)
2005–2008	Bargh Shiraz	60	(1)
2008–2010	Moghavemat	66	(0)
2010–2013	Rah Ahan	43	(2)
2013–2014	Padideh	14	(2)
2014–2016	Tractor Sazi	27	(0)
2016	Khoneh Be Khoneh	18	(1)
2017–2018	Siah Jamegan	2	(1)
- * Club domestic league appearances and goals as of 4 January 2015

Mirhani Hashemi (born 21 March 1983 in Sari, Iran) is an Iranian footballer who currently plays for Siah Jamegan.

== Professional ==
Sabri joined Moghavemat Sepasi in 2008 after spending the previous three years at Bargh Shiraz.

=== Club career statistics ===
As of 10 May 2013

Club performance			League		Cup		Continental		Total	
Season	Club	League	Apps	Goals	Apps	Goals	Apps	Goals	Apps	Goals
Iran			League		Hazfi Cup		Asia		Total	
2005–06	Bargh	Pro League	9	0			-	-		
2006–07	Bargh	Pro League	19	1			-	-		
2007–08	Bargh	Pro League	32	0			-	-		
2008–09	Moghavemat	Pro League	32	0		0	-	-		0
2009–10	Moghavemat	Pro League	34	0		0	-	-		0
2010–11	Rah Ahan	Pro League	27	0	0	0	-	-	7	0
2011–12	Rah Ahan	Pro League	16	2			-	-		
2012–13	Rah Ahan	Pro League	27	0	1	0	-	-	28	0
Career total			196	3			0	0		

- Assist Goals

Season	Team	Assists
10–11	Rah Ahan	0
