= Saman Nariman Jahan =

Iranian footballer

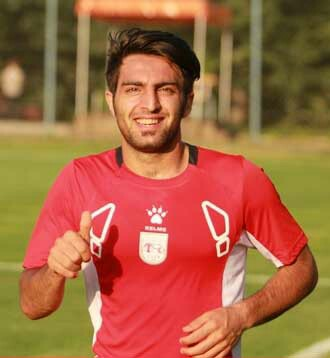
- Nariman Jahan with Tractor in 2015

Personal information
- Date of birth: 18 April 1991 (age 35)
- Place of birth: Bonab, Iran
- Height: 1.65 m (5 ft 5 in)
- Position: Winger

Team information
- Current team: Paykan
- Number: 9

Youth career
- 2007–2010: Tractor
- 2010–2012: Machine Sazi
- 2012: Naft Tehran

Senior career*
Years	Team	Apps	(Gls)
2012–2013	Naft Tehran	4	(0)
2012–2013	→ Gostaresh Foulad (loan)	25	(6)
2013–2016	Gostaresh Foulad	34	(5)
2014–2016	→ Tractor (loan)	36	(10)
2016–2017	Machine Sazi	12	(2)
2017	Persepolis	12	(0)
2017–2018	Gostaresh Foulad	22	(3)
2018–2019	Paykan	19	(1)
2019	Machine Sazi	15	(2)
2020–2021	Neftçi Baku	19	(1)
2021–2022	Tractor	39	(5)
2022–2023	Naft Masjed Soleyman	15	(2)
2023	Zob Ahan	14	(1)
2023–2024	Paykan	29	(3)
2024	Gol Gohar	1	(0)
2024–2025	Paykan	29	(5)
2025–2026	Mes Rafsanjan	19	(2)
2026–	Paykan	4	(0)

International career
2012	Iran U23	6	(1)
- * Club domestic league appearances and goals as of 21 April 2025

Saman Nariman Jahan (Persian: سامان نریمان جهان; born 18 April 1991) is an Iranian professional football player who plays as a winger for Paykan in the Persian Gulf Pro League.

== Club career ==
=== Gostaresh Foolad ===
He first started his senior career with Gostaresh in Azadegan League, he started his debut against Tarbiat Novin Yazd. He was usually in the starting eleven for Gostaresh, four weeks after his debut he scored a goal against Machine Sazi. He helped his team promote, he scored 4 of his goals for the club as a 21-year-old.

=== Tractor ===
After having a great reputation in Persian Gulf Pro League, Tractor decided to make an offer for him. Saman accepted the offer and joined Tractor in summer 2014. Saman was met to be the starter for Tractor in for the 2014–2015 Persian Gulf Pro League season.

On 10 May 2015, the second last match-day of the 2014–2015 Persian Gulf Pro League Nariman Jahan scored a hat-trick against Esteghlal at the Azadi Stadium in Tehran which kept Tractor at the top of the league with one match left.

=== Return to Gostaresh and Machine Sazi ===
In half of season 2015–2016, he returned to his previous football club Gostaresh and finished the season with this club. Nariman Jahan was mainly used as a substitute and scored one goal in 10 games. In June 2016 Nariman Jahan went on trial with Austrian Bundesliga club Wolfsberger AC. He did not join the team however due to financial issues.

Saman joined newly promoted team Machine Sazi before the start of the 2016–17 season. He scored in a draw against Esteghlal at the Azadi Stadium. He became known by fans as the Esteghlal Killer as this was his fourth career goal against Esteghlal.

=== Persepolis ===
On 4 January 2017 Nariman Jahan officially signed a 2 1/2-year contract with Persian Gulf Pro League leaders Persepolis. He was assigned the number 88 shirt. Nariman Jahan made his debut on 13 January 2017 in a match against Saipa at the Azadi Stadium.

=== Gostaresh Foolad ===
After playing for Perspolis, He decided to go back and again signed a contract with Gostaresh Foolad.

=== Neftchi Baku ===
On 10 January 2020, Nariman Jahan signed 1.5 years contract with Azerbaijan Premier League side Neftçi PFK. On 14 March 2021, Nariman Jahan left Neftçi by mutual consent.

== Career statistics ==
Club performance			League		Cup		Continental		Total	
Season	Club	League	Apps	Goals	Apps	Goals	Apps	Goals	Apps	Goals
Iran			League		Hazfi Cup		Asia		Total	
2012–13	Gostaresh	Azadegan League	25	4	0	0	–	–	25	4
2013–14	Gostaresh	Persian Gulf Cup	24	4	0	0	–	–	24	4
2014–15	Tractor(loan)	Persian Gulf Cup	28	9	0	0	–	–	28	9
2015–16	Tractor(loan)	Persian Gulf Cup	9	1	0	0	1	–	10	1
2015–16	Gostaresh	Persian Gulf Cup	7	1	1	5	–	–	8	6
2016-17	Machine Sazi	Persian Gulf Cup	14	2	0	0	–	–	14	2
2016-17	Perspolis	Persian Gulf Cup	11	0	0	0	2	0	13	0
2017-18	Gostaresh	Persian Gulf Cup	10	3	0	0	-	-	10	3
Total	Iran		117	21	1	5	3	0	121	26
Career total			117	21	1	5	3	0	121	26

== International career ==
In October 2014, the Team Meli head coach Carlos Queiroz decided to call-up Saman for a training camp held in Portugal, however he did not play any games and it still uncapped at the international senior level.

== Honours ==
Gostaresh Foolad

- Azadegan League (1): 2012–13

Persepolis

- Persian Gulf Pro League (1): 2016–17
