= Mohammad Ali Ramezanian =

Iranian footballer

Personal information
- Date of birth: 19 February 1993 (age 33)
- Place of birth: Babol, Iran
- Height: 1.84 m (6 ft 1/2 in)
- Position: Goalkeeper

Team information
- Current team: Pars Jonoubi

Youth career
- 2013–2014: Tractor

Senior career*
| Years | Team | Apps | (Gls) |
| 2014–2015 | Tractor | 0 | (0) |
| 2015–2016 | Rah Ahan | 2 | (0) |
| 2016– | Pars Jonoubi | 15 | (0) |
- * Club domestic league appearances and goals as of 15 December 2015

Mohammad Ali Ramezanian (Persian: محمدعلی رمضانیان, born 19 February 1993) is an Iranian football goalkeeper currently playing for Tractor.

== Club career ==
He is a product of Tractor youth academy, where he played at least a season before coming to play for the senior team. He is always considered as the third goalkeeper of Tractor. He was playing under former Team Meli player Rasoul Khatibi and under the former S.L. Benfica manager Toni, He did not play a minute in Persian Gulf Pro League. He was part of the team during the AFC Champions League matches.

== Honors ==
Tractor

- Hazfi Cup (1): 2013–14
