= Mehdi Ghoreishi =

Iranian footballer

Personal information
- Full name: Seyed Mehdi Ghoreishi
- Date of birth: 18 May 1990 (age 36)
- Place of birth: Tabriz, Iran
- Height: 1.84 m (6 ft 0 in)
- Position: Defender

Team information
- Current team: Mes Soongoun
- Number: 4

Senior career*
Years	Team	Apps	(Gls)
2012–2015	Gostaresh Foulad	34	(5)
2014–2015	Tractor	15	(0)
2015	Aluminium Arak	15	(2)
2016–2018	Machine Sazi	49	(2)
2019–2020	Elmoadab	11	(0)
2020–2021	Aluminium Arak	16	(1)
2021	Baadraan Tehran	5	(0)
2021–2022	Qashqai	12	(1)
2022	Bandar Astara	6	(0)
2022–	Mes Soongoun	39	(2)
- * Club domestic league appearances and goals as of 29 October 2024

Mehdi Ghoreishi (Persian: میر مهدی قریشی; born 18 May 1990) is an Iranian football defender who plays for Mes Soongoun.
