= Merooj =

Iranian sportswear company

Majid, Inc.
- Company type: Private
- Industry: Apparel, accessories
- Founded: 1987
- Founder: Majid Saedifar
- Headquarters: Andimeshk, Khuzestan, Iran
- Area served: Iran
- Key people: Majid Saedifar (President and CEO)
- Products: Athletic footwear and apparel, sport equipments and other athletic and recreational products
- Net income: Not clear
- Website: majidshop.ir

Merooj, Inc., which means ant in Luri language now rebranded as Majid, is an Iranian sports producer and brand of athletic shoes, clothing, and accessories. The company was established by Majid Saedifar. The company has headquarters in Andimeshk, Khuzestan Province, Iran.

Merooj was the official apparel supplier for the FIVB Beach Volleyball World Tour, for the year 2013.

== Sponsorship ==
Over the years, Merooj has sponsored a variety of sports clubs and teams. Current teams are:

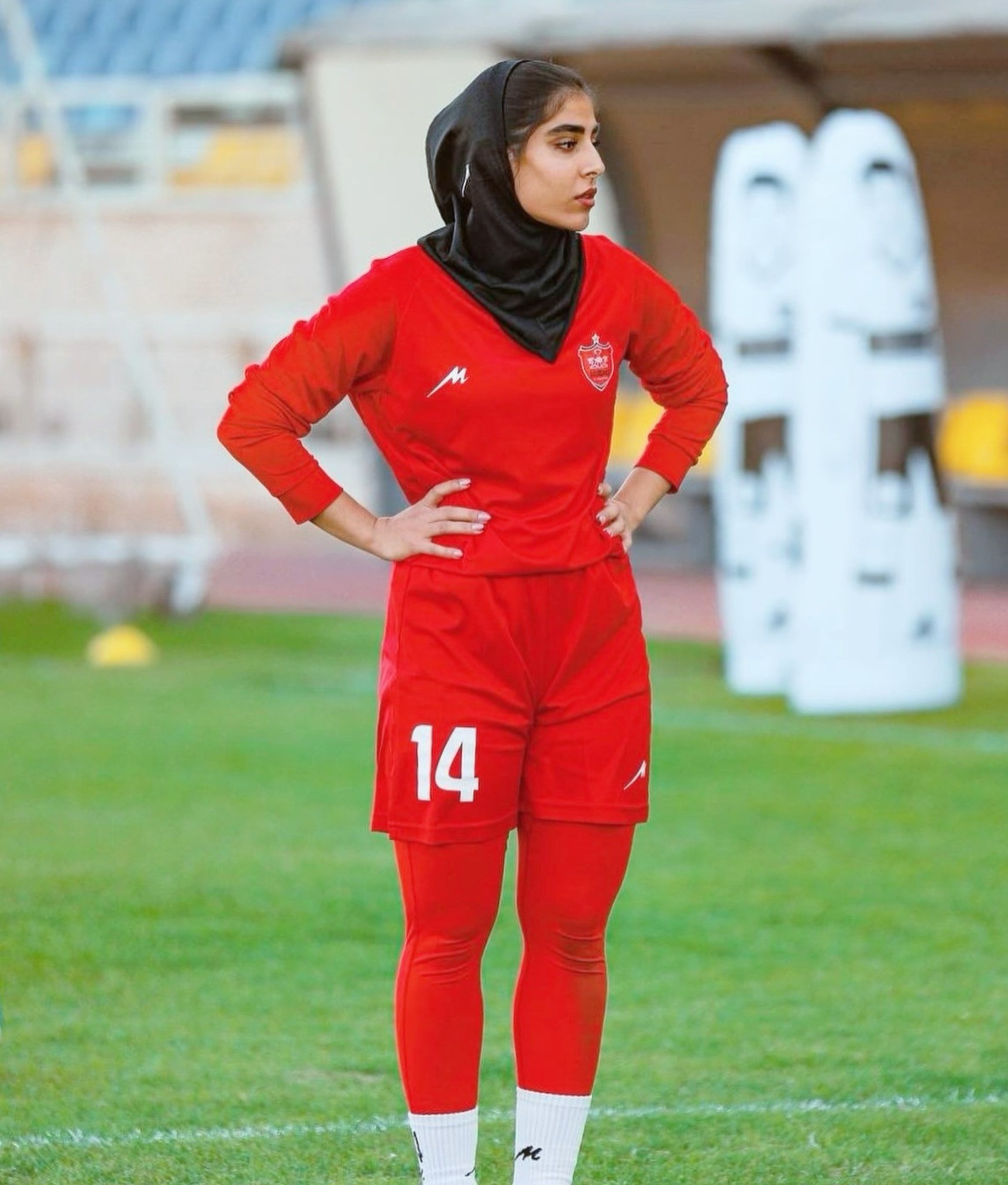
The company sponsored women's football clubs such Persepolis.

=== Football ===
==== National teams ====
- Iran

==== Club teams ====
- (Iran) Persepolis
- (Iran) Persepolis Women
- (Iran) Esteghlal Khuzestan

=== Volleyball ===
==== National teams ====
- Bangladesh
- Iran
- Pakistan
- Turkmenistan
- Uzbekistan
