= Edinho (footballer, born May 1982) =

Brazilian footballer

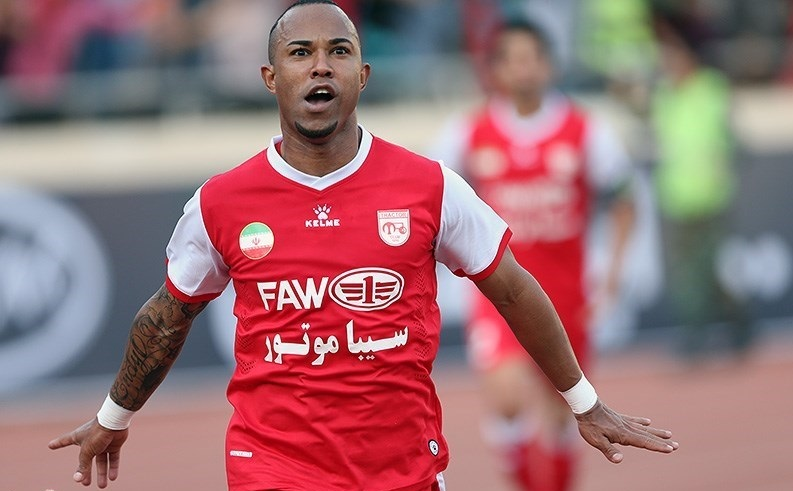
- Luciano playing for Tractor Sazi in 2017

Personal information
- Full name: Eder Luciano
- Date of birth: 31 May 1982 (age 44)
- Place of birth: Cariacica, Espírito Santo, Brazil
- Height: 1.77 m (5 ft 10 in)
- Position: Forward

Team information
- Current team: Rio Branco ES

Senior career*
| Years | Team | Apps | (Gls) |
| 2001–02 | Cachoeiro | | |
| 2002 | Busan | | |
| 2002–2003 | Gil Vicente | | |
| 2003–2004 | Lokomotiv Dryanovo | | |
| 2005 | Jaguaré | | |
| 2005 | Santo André | | |
| 2005 | Vitória-ES | | |
| 2006–2007 | Real (Portugal) | | |
| 2007 | Desportiva Ferroviária | | |
| 2007–2010 | Mes Kerman | | |
| 2011 | Veranópolis | | |
| 2011–2013 | Al Sharjah | 20 | (10) |
| 2013–2014 | Mes Kerman | 28 | (8) |
| 2014–2015 | Tractor Sazi | 30 | (20) |
| 2015–2016 | Al-Sailiya | 13 | (1) |
| 2016 | Desportiva Ferroviária | | |
| 2016–2017 | Tractor Sazi | 22 | (7) |
| 2017 | Desportiva Ferroviária | 3 | (1) |
| 2018 | Macaé | | |
| 2018 | Espírito Santo | 4 | (1) |
| 2019 | Goytacaz | | |
| 2020-2022 | Vitória ES | 12 | (2) |
| 2022-2024 | Porto Vitória-ES | | |
| 2024-2025 | Rio Branco ES | | |
- * Club domestic league appearances and goals as of 19:37, 7 December 2019 (UTC)

Eder Luciano (born 31 May 1982), known as Edinho is a Brazilian professional footballer who plays as a forward for Rio Branco ES.

== Career ==
Edinho was born in Cariacica.

=== Mes Kerman and Sharjah ===
Edinho played for Mes Kerman from 2008–09 to 2010–11 and then joined Al Sharjah for 2011–12. He returned to Mes for 2013–14.

=== Tractor ===
On 26 July 2014, Edinho agreed to a one-year contract with Tractor, and he signed the contract on the following day.

=== Al Sailiya ===
Edinho joined Qatar Stars League club Al Sailiya in July 2015.

=== Desportiva Ferroviária ===
Edinho joined Desportiva Ferroviária in January 2016, having previously helped them win the Serie B state title in 2007. He scored five goals for them in the 2016 championship, helping them to win the title. He was also named as one of the best players in the tournament.

=== Tractor ===
Edinho returned to former club Tractor for the 2016–17 season.

=== Vitória ===
Edinho signed a one-year contract with Vitória-ES in July 2019, having originally played for them in 2006 when they won the Capixaba title.
