= 2014–15 Persian Gulf Pro League =

14th season of Persian Gulf Pro League

Persian Gulf Pro League
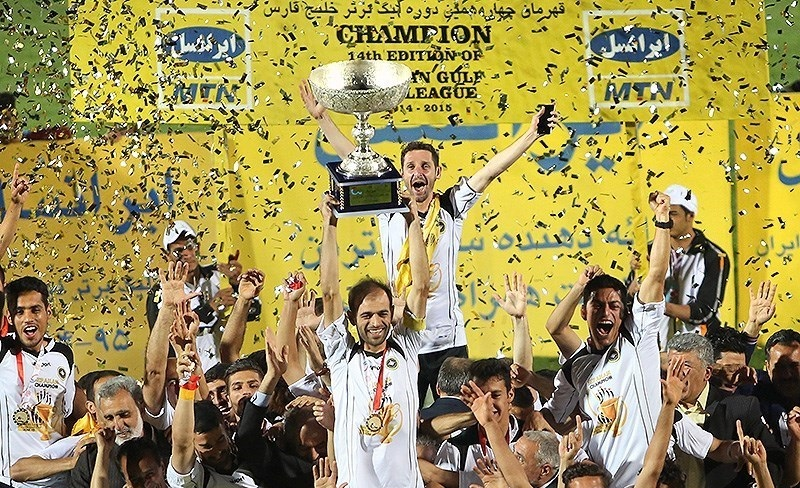
- Season: 2014–15
- Champions: Sepahan; 5th Pro League title 5th Iranian title
- Relegated: Paykan; Naft Masjed Soleyman
- Champions League: Sepahan; Tractor Sazi; Naft Tehran; Zob Ahan
- Matches: 240
- Goals: 536 (2.23 per match)
- Top goalscorer: Edinho (20 goals)
- Best goalkeeper: Alireza Salimi (16 clean sheets)
- Biggest home win: Saipa 4–0 Padideh (19 September 2014)
- Biggest away win: Paykan 0–3 Esteghlal (24 August 2014); Rah Ahan 0–3 Zob Ahan (5 February 2015); Rah Ahan 0–3 Tractor Sazi (12 March 2015); Esteghlal 1–4 Tractor Sazi (10 May 2015)
- Highest scoring: Esteghlal Khuzestan 4–4 Esteghlal (11 December 2014); Zob Ahan 5–3 Naft Tehran (16 April 2015)
- Longest winning run: 6 matches Sepahan
- Longest unbeaten run: 19 matches Naft Tehran
- Longest winless run: 18 matches Paykan
- Longest losing run: 6 matches Rah Ahan
- Highest attendance: 80,000; Tractor Sazi – Naft Tehran (15 May 2015)
- Lowest attendance: 0 (spectator ban); Naft MIS – Padideh (8 August 2014); Foolad – Saipa (29 August 2014); Sepahan – Est. Khuzestan (31 October 2014); Malavan – Padideh (2 December 2014); Tractor Sazi – Zob Ahan (11 December 2014); Persepolis – Foolad (11 December 2014); Foolad – Padideh (11 May 2015); Zob Ahan – Malavan (11 May 2015)
- Total attendance: 1,585,978
- Average attendance: 6,921

The 2014–15 Persian Gulf Pro League (formerly known as Iran Pro League) was the 32nd season of Iran's Football League and 14th as Persian Gulf Pro League since its establishment in 2001. Foolad were the defending champions. The season featured 13 teams from the 2013–14 Persian Gulf Cup and three new teams promoted from the 2013–14 Azadegan League: Padideh as champions, Naft Masjed Soleyman and Paykan. The league started on 1 August and ended on 15 May 2015. Sepahan won the Pro League title for the fifth time in their history (total fifth Iranian title).

== Changes ==
=== Rules and regulations ===
The Iranian Football Clubs who participated in 2014–15 Persian Gulf Pro League were allowed to have up to a maximum of 35 players (including up to maximum 4 non-Iranian players) in their player lists, which categorized in the following groups:

- Up to maximum 18 adult (without any age limit) players
- Up to maximum 9 under-23 players (i.e. the player whose birth is after 1 January 1992).
- Up to maximum 8 under-21 players (i.e. the player whose birth is after 1 January 1994).

== Teams ==
=== Stadia and locations ===
Locations of clubs in 2014–15 Iran Pro League

Team	City	Venue	Capacity
Esteghlal	Tehran	Azadi	95,225
Esteghlal Khuzestan	Ahvaz	Ghadir; Takhti Ahvaz	38,900; 15,000
Foolad Khuzestan	Ahvaz	Ghadir	38,900
Gostaresh	Tabriz	Bonyan Dizel	12,000
Malavan	Anzali	Takhti Anzali	8,000
Naft Masjed Soleyman	Masjed Soleyman	Behnam Mohammadi	8,000
Naft Tehran	Tehran	Takhti Tehran	30,122
Padideh	Mashhad	Samen	35,000
Paykan	Qods	Shahr-e Qods; Shahid Dastgerdi	25,000; 8,250
Persepolis	Tehran	Azadi	95,225
Rah Ahan	Tehran	Shahr-e Qods; Rah Ahan	25,000; 12,000
Saba Qom	Qom	Yadegar Emam	10,610
Saipa	Karaj	Enghelab Karaj	15,000
Sepahan	Esfahan	Foolad Shahr	15,000
Tractor Sazi	Tabriz	Sahand	66,833
Zob Ahan	Esfahan	Foolad Shahr	15,000

=== Personnel and kits ===
Note: Flags indicate national team as has been defined under FIFA eligibility rules. Players may hold more than one non-FIFA nationality.

Team	Manager	Captain	Kit manufacturer	Shirt sponsor
Esteghlal	(Iran) Amir Ghalenoei	(Iran) Reza Enayati	(Iran) Merooj	Pardisban
Est. Khuzestan	(Iran) Abdollah Veisi	(Iran) Mohammad Reza Mahdavi	(Germany) Uhlsport	INSIG
Foolad	(Croatia) Dragan Skočić	(Iran) Bakhtiar Rahmani	(Germany) Uhlsport	Foolad Khuzestan
Gostaresh	(Iran) Faraz Kamalvand	(Iran) Meysam Naghizadeh	(Spain) Kelme	Ata Airlines
Malavan	(Iran) Firouz Karimi	(Iran) Maziar Zare	(Iran) Daei	Steel Azin Iranian
Naft MIS	(Iran) Behrouz Makvandi	(Iran) Reza Darvishi	(Iran) Merooj	NIOC
Naft Tehran	(Iran) Alireza Mansourian	(Iran) Alireza Ezzati	(Germany) Uhlsport	Naft-G
Padideh	(Iran) Alireza Marzban	(Iran) Mojtaba Roshangar	(Iran) Merooj	Padideh Co.
Paykan	(Iran) Samad Marfavi	(Iran) Mehdi Rahmati	(Iran) Merooj	Iran Khodro
Persepolis	(Croatia) Branko Ivanković	(Iran) Mohammad Nouri	(Italy) Macron	Behnam Pishro
Rah Ahan	(Iran) Farhad Kazemi	(Iran) Ebrahim Karimi	(Iran) Merooj	Fars Air Qeshm
Saba Qom	(Iran) Mehdi Tartar	(Iran) Morteza Kashi	(Iran) Merooj	Azar Khodro
Saipa	(Iran) Majid Jalali	(Iran) Ebrahim Sadeghi	(Iran) Merooj	SAIPA
Sepahan	(Iran) Hossein Faraki	(Iran) Hadi Aghily	(Germany) Uhlsport	Foolad Mobarakeh
Tractor Sazi	(Portugal) Toni	(Iran) Mehdi Kiani	(Spain) Kelme	Hamrah-e Aval
Zob Ahan	(Iran) Yahya Golmohammadi	(Iran) Ghasem Hadadifar	(Iran) Merooj	Xballer

== Managerial changes ==
Team	Outgoing head coach	Manner of departure	Date of vacancy	Position in table	Incoming head coach	Date of appointment
Padideh	(Iran) Akbar Misaghian	Resigned	2 May 2014	Pre-season	(Iran) Alireza Marzban	7 May 2014
Naft Tehran	(Iran) Yahya Golmohammadi	Mutual consent	10 May 2014	Pre-season	(Iran) Alireza Mansourian	1 July 2014
Zob Ahan	(Iran) Firouz Karimi	End of contract	10 May 2014	Pre-season	(Iran) Yahya Golmohammadi	10 May 2014
Saipa	(Germany) Engin Firat	End of contract	13 May 2014	Pre-season	(Iran) Majid Jalali	13 May 2014
Foolad	(Iran) Hossein Faraki	Mutual consent	23 May 2014	Pre-season	(Croatia) Dragan Skočić	23 May 2014
Malavan	(Croatia) Dragan Skočić	Signed by Foolad	23 May 2014	Pre-season	(Iran) Nosrat Irandoost	24 May 2014
Paykan	(Iran) Farhad Kazemi	Mutual consent	1 July 2014	Pre-season	(Iran) Mansour Ebrahimzadeh	1 July 2014
Rah Ahan	(Iran) Mansour Ebrahimzadeh	Mutual consent	1 July 2014	Pre-season	(Iran) Hamid Estili	1 July 2014
Sepahan	(Croatia) Zlatko Kranjčar	Resigned	8 September 2014	4th	(Iran) Hossein Faraki	9 September 2014
Persepolis	(Iran) Ali Daei	Sacked	10 September 2014	9th	(Iran) Hamid Derakhshan	10 September 2014
Gostaresh	(Iran) Mehdi Tartar	Sacked	4 October 2014	13th	(Iran) Faraz Kamalvand	4 October 2014
Malavan	(Iran) Nosrat Irandoost	Sacked	8 October 2014	15th	(Serbia) Stevan Mojsilović	8 October 2014
Paykan	(Iran) Mansour Ebrahimzadeh	Sacked	25 November 2014	11th	(Iran) Samad Marfavi	27 November 2014
Saba Qom	(Iran) Samad Marfavi	Mutual consent	26 November 2014	6th	(Iran) Mehdi Tartar	5 December 2014
Malavan	(Serbia) Stevan Mojsilović	Sacked	5 December 2014	16th	(Iran) Firouz Karimi	6 December 2014
Rah Ahan	(Iran) Hamid Estili	Resigned	2 February 2015	14th	(Iran) Farhad Kazemi	18 February 2015
Tractor Sazi	(Iran) Rasoul Khatibi	Sacked	8 February 2015	5th	(Portugal) Toni	15 February 2015
Persepolis	(Iran) Hamid Derakhshan	Resigned	5 April 2015	9th	(Croatia) Branko Ivanković	6 April 2015
Malavan	(Iran) Firouz Karimi	Resigned	23 May 2015	13th, post season	(Iran) Hamid Estili	16 July 2015
Esteghlal	(Iran) Amir Ghalenoei	Sacked	18 May 2015	5th, post season	(Iran) Parviz Mazloumi	21 June 2015

== Foreign players ==
Club	Player 1	Player 2	Player 3	Asian Player	Former Players
Esteghlal	(Armenia) Hrayr Mkoyan			(Iraq) Karrar Jassim	(Brazil) Rafael (Germany) Hendrik Helmke
ESteghlal Khuzestan	(Mali) Lamine Diawara	(Mali) Moussa Coulibaly	(Mali) Soumbeïla Diakité		
Foolad Khuzestan	(Cameroon) Aloys Nong	(Cameroon) Mathias Chago	(Croatia) Leonard Mesarić		
Gostaresh	(Brazil) Diogo Orlando	(Brazil) Léo Pimenta	(Brazil) Magno		(Uruguay) Rodrigo Odriozola
Malavan					
Naft Masjed	(Brazil) Maranhão	(Bulgaria) Georgi Georgiev	(Moldova) Alexandru Pașcenco	(Uzbekistan) Ruslan Melziddinov	
Naft Tehran	(Azerbaijan) Ali Ghorbani	(Brazil) Leandro Padovani	(Netherlands) Donovan Deekman		(Cameroon) David Wirikom
Padideh	(Croatia) Igor Prahić	(Montenegro) Milan Jovanović	(Serbia) Zoran Knežević	(Uzbekistan) Bahodir Nasimov	
Paykan	(Bosnia and Herzegovina) Muamer Svraka	(Brazil) Dodô	(Trinidad and Tobago) Jlloyd Samuel	(Uzbekistan) Oybek Kilichev	(Croatia) Mate Eterović
Persepolis	(Brazil) Fernando Gabriel	(Brazil) Tadeu	(Costa Rica) Michael Umaña		(Brazil) Nilson
Rah Ahan	(Slovenia) Igor Nenezić	(Uganda) Martin Kayongo-Mutumba			
Saba Qom	(Cameroon) Ambuno Achille	(Georgia (country)) Ioseb Chakhvashvili			(Brazil) Marquinho
Saipa					
Sepahan	(Albania) Xhevahir Sukaj	(Brazil) Chimba	(Brazil) Márcio Passos	(Uzbekistan) Fozil Musaev	
Tractor Sazi	(Brazil) Célio Santos	(Brazil) Edinho	(Senegal) Issa Ndoye		(Albania) Ditmar Bicaj (Brazil) Radamés (Iraq) Alaa Abdul-Zahra
Zob Ahan	(Azerbaijan) Hojjat Haghverdi	(Brazil) Carlos	(Lebanon) Ali Hamam	(Lebanon) Walid Ismail	

== League table ==
Pos	Team	Pld	W	D	L	GF	GA	GD	Pts	Qualification or relegation
1	Sepahan (C)	30	17	8	5	46	27	+19	59	Qualification for the 2016 AFC Champions League group stage
2	Tractor Sazi	30	17	7	6	58	34	+24	58	Qualification for the 2016 AFC Champions League group stage
3	Naft Tehran	30	16	10	4	45	28	+17	58	Qualification for the 2016 AFC Champions League qualifying play-off
4	Zob Ahan	30	14	10	6	46	26	+20	52	Qualification for the 2016 AFC Champions League Group stage (Note: Zob Ahan secured qualification for the 2016 AFC Champions League through winning the 2014–15 Hazfi Cup.)
5	Foolad	30	15	7	8	33	24	+9	52	
6	Esteghlal	30	13	8	9	40	34	+6	47	
7	Saipa	30	11	8	11	36	34	+2	41	
8	Persepolis	30	9	9	12	31	35	−4	36	
9	Saba Qom	30	8	10	12	25	34	−9	34	
10	Padideh	30	6	15	9	23	25	−2	33	
11	Gostaresh	30	6	13	11	30	39	−9	31	
12	Rah Ahan	30	8	7	15	27	48	−21	31	
13	Malavan	30	6	12	12	26	34	−8	30	
14	Est. Khuzestan (O)	30	4	15	11	35	46	−11	27	Qualification to relegation play-offs
15	Paykan (R)	30	4	14	12	16	29	−13	26	Relegation to 2015–16 Azadegan League
16	Naft Masjed Soleyman (R)	30	3	13	14	19	39	−20	22	Relegation to 2015–16 Azadegan League

Updated to match(es) played on 15 May 2015. Source: FIFA.com
Rules for classification: 1) points; 2) goal difference; 3) number of goals scored.
(C) Champions; (O) Play-off winners; (R) Relegated

== Results ==
Home \ Away	EST	ESK	FOL	GOS	MLV	NFT	NAF	PAD	PAY	PRS	RAH	SAB	SAP	SEP	TRK	ZOB
Esteghlal		1–0	0–1	3–0	3–1	1–0	0–1	0–0	1–0	1–2	1–0	1–1	3–2	2–1	1–4	1–1
Est. Khuzestan	4–4		0–3	1–1	1–3	0–0	1–2	1–1	1–1	1–1	1–0	2–0	2–0	1–3	2–2	1–1
Foolad	2–1	1–0		1–0	1–0	2–2	2–2	0–0	0–0	2–0	2–0	0–1	1–1	0–1	3–2	0–2
Gostaresh	0–0	2–2	3–1		3–2	0–0	1–1	0–1	1–0	2–1	2–0	0–0	2–3	0–2	1–3	3–2
Malavan	1–1	1–1	0–0	1–1		1–0	1–1	2–2	1–1	2–1	3–0	0–0	0–2	1–0	0–0	1–3
Naft Masjed Soleyman	0–2	0–0	2–1	1–1	3–2		0–2	0–3	0–0	2–2	1–1	1–0	0–1	1–3	1–2	1–1
Naft Tehran	2–0	1–1	0–1	2–1	2–0	1–0		1–0	0–0	2–1	1–2	1–0	3–1	3–0	2–1	0–0
Padideh	1–1	1–1	0–0	2–1	0–0	1–1	1–2		1–2	0–1	3–0	1–1	0–0	0–1	1–0	0–0
Paykan	0–3	1–1	1–0	1–1	1–0	0–0	1–1	0–0		0–1	2–3	0–1	0–0	1–2	0–2	1–3
Persepolis	1–0	2–1	1–2	2–2	0–1	1–1	1–1	1–1	1–0		2–2	0–0	0–1	1–2	1–3	1–0
Rah Ahan	1–2	2–2	0–1	1–0	1–0	2–2	0–1	1–0	0–0	1–2		2–2	2–1	1–0	0–3	0–3
Saba Qom	1–2	1–2	0–2	1–0	1–1	2–0	1–2	0–0	0–0	0–2	1–0		1–0	2–0	2–3	2–1
Saipa	0–1	3–2	3–1	0–0	1–0	0–0	2–1	4–0	1–1	2–2	1–2	3–0		2–2	0–1	1–0
Sepahan	3–1	3–2	1–1	4–1	1–1	1–0	1–1	1–0	2–0	1–0	3–0	1–1	2–0		2–1	1–1
Tractor Sazi	2–2	3–0	2–1	1–1	1–0	3–0	3–3	1–3	1–2	1–0	4–1	4–2	2–1	1–1		2–1
Zob Ahan	2–1	2–1	0–1	0–0	2–0	2–0	5–3	2–0	1–0	1–0	2–2	3–1	4–1	1–1	0–0	

Updated to match(es) played on 15 May 2015. Source: IPL Stats
Legend: Blue = home team win; Yellow = draw; Red = away team win.

== Positions by round ==
Team ╲ Round	1	2	3	4	5	6	7	8	9	10	11	12	13	14	15	16	17	18	19	20	21	22	23	24	25	26	27	28	29	30
Sepahan	1	1	1	1	2	4	4	3	4	4	3	4	4	2	3	2	2	3	4	3	4	4	4	4	3	3	3	3	3	1
Tractor Sazi	3	4	2	7	3	2	2	1	1	1	1	1	1	1	1	3	3	4	5	5	2	2	2	2	2	1	1	1	1	2
Naft Tehran	7	10	7	6	7	6	7	7	6	5	5	7	5	4	2	1	1	1	2	1	1	1	1	1	1	2	2	2	2	3
Zob Ahan	14	12	16	13	13	13	14	12	14	12	12	13	13	13	9	9	9	8	6	6	6	6	6	6	6	6	5	4	4	4
Foolad	13	6	3	2	4	5	5	4	3	3	4	3	2	3	4	4	4	2	1	4	5	5	5	5	4	4	4	5	5	5
Esteghlal	2	2	4	3	1	1	1	2	2	2	2	2	3	5	5	5	5	5	3	2	3	3	3	3	5	5	6	6	6	6
Saipa	12	8	9	12	9	9	6	6	5	6	6	5	7	7	8	6	6	6	7	7	7	7	7	7	7	7	7	7	7	7
Persepolis	5	13	8	11	12	7	9	9	8	7	9	9	8	8	7	8	8	9	10	9	9	9	9	9	9	10	10	9	9	8
Saba Qom	4	5	6	5	6	8	8	8	9	9	8	6	6	6	6	7	7	7	8	8	8	8	8	8	8	8	8	8	8	9
Padideh	11	3	5	4	5	3	3	5	7	8	7	8	9	9	10	10	10	10	9	10	10	10	10	10	10	9	9	10	10	10
Gostaresh	6	14	12	9	10	12	12	14	10	11	13	14	14	14	14	13	13	13	14	15	14	14	13	13	11	12	11	11	11	11
Rah Ahan	15	7	10	10	8	10	10	10	13	13	14	12	11	11	13	14	14	14	15	16	16	16	16	16	16	15	16	15	12	12
Malavan	10	9	11	8	11	11	11	13	15	15	15	15	16	16	16	16	16	16	16	14	11	11	11	11	12	11	12	12	13	13
Est. Khuzestan	8	11	15	16	15	14	15	11	12	14	11	11	12	12	12	11	11	11	12	12	13	13	12	12	14	13	13	13	14	14
Paykan	16	15	13	14	16	15	13	15	11	10	10	10	10	10	11	12	12	12	11	11	12	12	14	14	13	14	14	14	15	15
Naft M.S.	9	16	14	15	14	16	16	16	16	16	16	16	15	15	15	15	15	15	13	13	15	15	15	15	15	16	15	16	16	16

Leader
2016 AFC Champions League
Relegation to Play-offs Qualification
Relegation to 2015–16 Azadegan League

Source: FIFA.com (in English)

== Clubs season-progress ==
Team ╲ Round	1	2	3	4	5	6	7	8	9	10	11	12	13	14	15	16	17	18	19	20	21	22	23	24	25	26	27	28	29	30
Sepahan	W	W	W	L	D	D	D	W	D	D	W	L	W	W	D	W	W	L	D	W	D	L	W	L	W	W	W	W	W	W
Tractor Sazi	W	D	W	L	W	W	W	W	D	D	W	L	W	D	L	L	W	D	L	W	W	W	W	W	L	W	W	D	W	D
Naft Tehran	D	L	W	W	L	D	D	W	W	D	D	D	W	W	W	W	W	D	D	W	D	W	W	W	L	L	W	W	W	D
Zob Ahan	L	D	L	D	D	D	L	W	L	W	D	L	D	W	W	W	L	W	W	W	D	W	W	D	D	W	W	W	W	D
Foolad	L	W	W	W	D	D	L	W	W	D	L	W	W	D	L	W	W	W	W	L	L	D	L	W	W	W	L	D	D	W
Esteghlal	W	W	L	W	W	W	W	L	L	L	W	D	D	D	L	W	D	W	W	W	D	W	L	L	D	D	D	W	L	L
Saipa	D	D	D	L	W	D	W	W	W	L	L	W	L	L	D	W	D	W	L	L	W	L	W	D	W	L	D	L	W	L
Persepolis	D	L	W	L	D	W	L	D	W	W	L	L	W	D	W	L	L	L	L	W	D	L	D	D	D	L	D	W	L	W
Saba Qom	W	D	D	W	L	L	D	L	D	W	W	W	D	L	W	L	D	D	L	L	D	W	L	W	L	D	D	L	L	L
Padideh	D	W	D	W	D	W	D	L	L	L	W	D	L	D	L	D	D	D	W	L	L	D	L	D	D	W	D	L	D	D
Gostaresh	D	L	D	W	D	L	D	L	W	D	L	L	L	D	W	D	L	L	D	D	D	L	W	D	W	L	D	D	W	L
Rah Ahan	L	W	L	D	W	L	D	L	L	D	L	W	W	D	L	L	L	L	L	L	W	L	L	D	D	D	L	W	W	W
Malavan	D	D	L	W	L	D	D	L	L	D	L	D	L	L	L	D	D	D	W	W	W	W	L	D	L	D	L	D	L	W
Est. Khuzestan	D	L	L	L	D	D	D	W	D	L	W	D	L	W	D	D	D	D	L	L	L	D	W	L	D	D	D	L	L	D
Paykan	L	D	D	L	L	D	W	L	W	W	L	W	L	D	D	L	D	D	D	L	D	D	L	D	D	D	L	L	L	D
Naft M.S.	D	L	D	L	D	L	L	D	L	D	W	D	D	L	W	L	D	D	W	D	L	L	D	L	D	L	D	L	L	L

Source: IPL Stats
W = Win; D = Draw; L = Lose

== Relegation play-off ==
Team 1	Agg.	Team 2	1st leg	2nd leg
Esteghlal Khuzestan	3–0	Mes Kerman	1–0	2–0

Esteghlal Khuzestan as 14th-placed team will faced Play-off winner of 2014–15 Azadegan League, Mes Kerman in a two-legged Play-off.

25 May 2015
16:00 CEST

Esteghlal Khuzestan	1 – 0	Mes Kerman
Momeni 90+5'

Ghadir, Ahvaz
Attendance: 2,500
30 May 2015
15:30 CEST

Mes Kerman	0 – 2	Esteghlal Khuzestan
		Diawara 56', 79'

Shahid Bahonar, Kerman
Attendance: 15,000

Esteghlal Khuzestan won 3–0 on aggregate and retained its place in the next edition of the Persian Gulf Pro League

== Season statistics ==
=== Top goalscorers ===
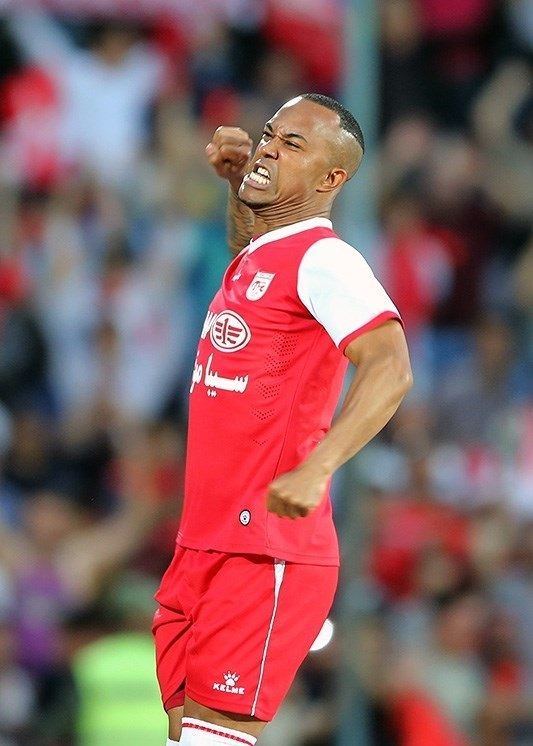
Edinho

Rank	Player	Club	Goals
1	(Brazil) Edinho	Tractor Sazi	20
2	(Iran) Sajjad Shahbazzadeh	Esteghlal	12
2	(Iran) Mehdi Sharifi	Sepahan	12
4	(Brazil) Luciano Pereira	Sepahan	11
5	(Iran) Jaber Ansari	Gostaresh Foolad	9
5	(Iran) Omid Ebrahimi	Esteghlal	9
5	(Iran) Reza Enayati	Esteghlal / Padideh	9
5	(Iran) Masoud Hassanzadeh	Zob Ahan	9
5	(Iran) Mohammad Reza Khalatbari	Sepahan	9
5	(Iran) Amir Arsalan Motahari	Naft Tehran	9
5	(Iran) Saman Nariman Jahan	Tractor Sazi	9
5	(Cameroon) Aloys Nong	Foolad	9
5	(Iran) Ramin Rezaeian	Rah Ahan	9

Last updated: 15 May 2015
Source: Soccerway.com

=== Hat-tricks ===
Player	Club	Against	Result	Date
(Iran) Mohammad Reza Khalatbari	Sepahan	Gostaresh	4–1	10 December 2014
(Iran) Kaveh Rezaei	Zob Ahan	Naft Tehran	5–3	16 March 2015
(Iran) Saman Nariman Jahan	Tractor Sazi	Esteghlal	4–1	10 April 2015

=== Clean sheets ===
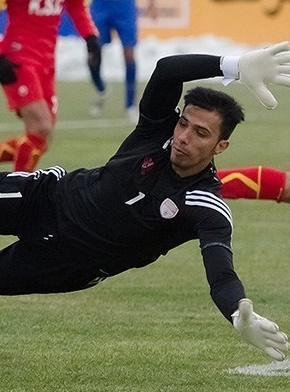
Alireza Salimi

Position	Player	Club	Clean sheets
1	(Iran) Alireza Salimi	Foolad	16
2	(Iran) Mehrdad Tahmasbi	Saba Qom	10
3	(Iran) Alireza Beiranvand	Naft Tehran	9
3	(Iran) Hamed Fallahzadeh	Saipa	9
3	(Iran) Mohsen Forouzan	Esteghlal	9
3	(Iran) Mohammad-Rashid Mazaheri	Zob Ahan	9
3	(Iran) Mehdi Rahmati	Paykan	9
3	(Iran) Mojtaba Roshangar	Padideh	9
9	(Iran) Hamed Lak	Tractor Sazi	8
10	(Iran) Shahab Gordan	Sepahan	5
10	(Iran) Sosha Makani	Persepolis	5
10	(Iran) Davoud Noushi Soufiani	Gostaresh	5
13	(Iran) Rahman Ahmadi	Sepahan	4
13	(Iran) Parviz Karimi	Esteghlal Khuzestan	4
13	(Iran) Iman Sadeghi	Malavan	4

Last Update: 15 May 2015

=== Scoring ===
- First goal of the season: Saman Nariman Jahan for Tractor Sazi against Foolad (1 August 2014)
- Fastest goal of the season: 11 seconds, Mohammad Reza Khalatbari for Sepahan against Gostaresh (10 December 2014)
- Latest goal of the season: 97 minutes and 5 seconds, Ahmad Hassanzadeh for Saba Qom against Padideh (14 August 2014)
- Largest winning margin: 4 goals
  - Saipa 4–0 Padideh (19 September 2014)
- Highest scoring game: 8 goals
  - Esteghlal Khuzestan 4–4 Esteghlal (11 December 2014)
  - Zob Ahan 5–3 Naft Tehran (16 April 2015)
- Most goals scored in a match by a losing team: 3 goals
  - Zob Ahan 5–3 Naft Tehran (16 April 2015)

== Awards ==
=== Team of the Season ===
Goalkeeper: Alireza Beiranvand (Naft Tehran)
Defence: Ramin Rezaian (Rah Ahan), Leandro Padovani (Naft Tehran), Leonard Mesarić (Foolad), Vouria Ghafouri (Sepahan)
Midfield: Ghasem Haddadifar (Zob Ahan), Omid Ebrahimi (Esteghlal), Andranik Teymourian (Esteghlal/Tractor Sazi)
Attack: Sajjad Shahbazzadeh (Esteghlal), Edinho (Tractor Sazi), Mehdi Taremi (Perspolis)

=== Player of the Season ===
Ghasem Haddadifar was awarded as the best player of the season among Andranik Teymourian became second. Amir Arsalan Motahari was also awarded as the best young player of the season.

=== Other awards ===
Hossein Faraki was awarded as the best coach of the season. Mehdi Taremi won the best striker award.

== Attendance ==
=== Average home attendance ===
Pos	Team	Total	High	Low	Average	Change
1	Tractor Sazi	384,828	80,000	0	27,488	+26.9%
2	Esteghlal	246,000	67,000	2,000	16,400	−17.0%
3	Persepolis	220,746	70,000	0	15,768	−46.5%
4	Padideh	155,400	35,000	250	10,360	n/a
5	Foolad	87,200	25,000	0	6,708	−25.8%
6	Naft MIS	85,900	8,000	0	6,136	n/a
7	Sepahan	81,570	15,000	0	5,826	+21.4%
8	Malavan	63,721	8,500	0	4,552	+2.7%
9	Paykan	51,450	10,330	100	3,430	n/a
10	Est. Khuzestan	40,331	10,500	87	2,689	−31.9%
11	Saipa	38,726	15,000	200	2,582	+8.8%
12	Gostaresh	30,231	15,000	195	2,015	−30.5%
13	Naft Tehran	28,900	12,000	120	1,927	−16.6%
14	Zob Ahan	26,650	7,500	0	1,904	−33.1%
15	Rah Ahan	23,856	8,000	100	1,590	−4.4%
16	Saba Qom	20,469	10,000	100	1,365	−50.2%
	League total	1,585,978	80,000	0	6,921	−9.3%

Updated to games played on 15 May 2015
Source: Iranleague.ir
Notes:
Matches with spectator bans are not included in average attendances
Naft MIS, Padideh and Paykan played last season in Azadegan League

=== Attendance by round ===
Team/Round	1	2	3	4	5	6	7	8	9	10	11	12	13	14	15	16	17	18	19	20	21	22	23	24	25	26	27	28	29	30	Average
Esteghlal	A	12,000	A	9,000	A	15,000	A	A	17,000	A	10,000	A	18,000	A	67,000	2,000	A	10,000	A	6,000	A	5,000	17,000	A	12,000	A	11,000	A	35,000	A	16,400
Esteghlal Khuzestan	110	A	1,000	A	214	A	87	A	1,500	A	150	2,150	A	170	A	A	6,000	A	10,500	A	200	A	250	A	6,000	A	A	6,000	A	6,000	2,689
Foolad	A	11,000	A	3,000	A	NC	A	2,500	A	2,000	A	A	2,500	A	2,000	6,500	A	4,000	A	25,000	A	2,500	A	14,000	A	6,000	6,200	A	NC	A	6,708
Gostaresh	A	1,500	A	195	A	A	250	A	750	A	500	A	15,000	A	200	265	A	450	A	500	3,500	A	1,000	A	370	A	4,751	A	1,000	A	2,015
Malavan	A	1,987	A	8,000	A	3,000	A	2,000	A	1,334	A	1,800	A	2,500	A	NC	A	6,000	A	2,500	A	6,100	A	5,000	A	8,500	A	8,000	A	7,000	4,552
Naft MIS	A	NC	A	A	4,500	A	6,500	A	5,500	A	6,500	A	6,000	A	5,000	7,000	A	5,900	5,000	A	5,000	A	8,000	A	8,000	A	6,000	A	7,000	A	6,136
Naft Tehran	A	300	A	800	A	220	A	12,000	A	A	120	A	330	A	5,000	7,000	A	140	A	300	A	200	A	190	300	A	1,000	A	1,000	A	1,927
Padideh	10,500	A	4,500	12,500	A	8,000	A	22,000	A	10,000	A	35,000	A	5,600	A	A	650	A	A	30,000	A	250	A	3,000	A	1,400	A	10,000	A	2,000	10,360
Paykan	A	370	700	A	10,000	A	350	A	250	A	100	A	10,330	A	150	400	A	A	2,200	A	6,500	A	3,000	A	4,100	A	10,000	A	3,000	A	3,430
Persepolis	18,000	A	15,000	A	7,000	A	35,000	11,000	A	13,246	A	4,500	A	4,000	A	A	NC	A	8,000	A	5,000	A	A	5,000	A	20,000	A	5,000	A	70,000	15,768
Rah Ahan	8,000	A	600	A	500	A	500	A	6,000	400	A	371	A	150	A	A	100	A	200	A	100	A	3,700	A	A	1,235	A	1,000	A	1,000	1,590
Saba Qom	215	A	A	150	A	10,000	A	250	A	100	A	150	A	130	A	A	200	170	A	1,004	A	200	A	400	A	500	A	6,000	A	1,000	1,365
Saipa	1,000	A	226	A	800	A	500	A	500	A	3,500	A	300	A	15,000	A	200	A	6,500	A	450	A	450	A	300	A	8,000	A	1,000	A	2,582
Sepahan	8,000	A	13,000	A	5,000	A	2,200	A	2,000	A	13,500	A	NC	1,700	A	A	1,300	A	2,170	A	7,200	A	1,800	A	3,200	A	5,500	A	A	15,000	5,826
Tractor Sazi	20,000	A	14,000	A	8,000	10,400	A	12,000	A	51,500	A	12,700	A	65,000	A	A	NC	A	15,000	A	A	30,178	A	15,000	A	35,050	A	16,000	A	80,000	27,488
Zob Ahan	A	1,500	A	700	A	4,800	A	700	A	7,500	A	1,000	A	A	600	400	A	4,000	A	750	A	800	A	600	A	1,300	A	2,000	NC	A	1,904
Total	65,825	28,657	49,026	34,345	36,014	51,420	45,387	62,450	33,500	86,080	34,370	56,771	52,460	79,250	94,950	23,565	8,450	30,660	49,570	66,054	27,950	45,228	35,200	43,190	34,720	73,985	52,451	54,000	48,000	182,000	1,585,978
Average	8,228	4,093	6,128	4,293	4,502	7,346	5,673	7,806	4,188	10,760	4,296	7,096	7,494	9,906	11,869	3,366	1,408	3,833	6,196	8,257	3,494	5,654	4,400	5,399	4,284	9,248	6,556	6,750	8,000	22,750	6,921

Notes:
Updated to games played on 15 May 2015. Source: Iranleague.ir
Matches with spectator bans are not included in average attendances
Gostaresh played their match against Tractor Sazi at Sahand
Paykan played their matches against Esteghlal and Persepolis at Takhti Tehran
Rah Ahan played their matches against Esteghlal and Persepolis at Takhti Tehran

=== Highest attendances ===
Rank	Home team	Score	Away team	Attendance	Date	Week	Stadium
1	Tractor Sazi	3–3	Naft Tehran	80,000	15 May 2015	30	Sahand
2	Persepolis	1–0	Esteghlal	70,000	15 May 2015	30	Azadi
3	Esteghlal	1–2	Persepolis	67,000	23 November 2014	15	Azadi
4	Tractor Sazi	2–2	Esteghlal	65,000	7 November 2014	14	Sahand
5	Tractor Sazi	1–1	Sepahan	51,500	26 September 2014	10	Sahand
6	Tractor Sazi	2–1	Saipa	35,050	16 April 2015	26	Sahand
7	Persepolis	1–3	Tractor Sazi	35,000	5 September 2014	7	Azadi
7	Padideh	0–1	Persepolis	35,000	22 October 2014	12	Samen
7	Esteghlal	1–4	Tractor Sazi	35,000	11 May 2015	29	Azadi
10	Tractor Sazi	1–0	Persepolis	30,178	8 March 2015	22	Sahand

Notes:
Updated to games played on 15 May 2015. Source: Iranleague.ir

== See also ==
- 2014–15 Azadegan League
- 2014–15 Iran Football's 2nd Division
- 2014–15 Iran Football's 3rd Division
- 2014–15 Hazfi Cup
- Iranian Super Cup
- 2014–15 Iranian Futsal Super League
