= 2014–15 Naft Tehran F.C. season =

Naft Tehran
2014–15 season
- Chairman: Mansour Ghanbarzadeh
- Manager: Ali Reza Mansourian
- Stadium: Takhti Stadium
- Iran Pro League: 3rd
- Top goalscorer: League: Amir Arsalan Motahari (8); All: Amir Arsalan Motahari (11)
- Highest home attendance: 13,370 (20 May 2015 against Al-Ahli ACL)
- Lowest home attendance: 300 (7 August 2014 against Rah Ahan)
- Average home league attendance: 2,067
Home colours	Away colours

The 2014–15 season is Naft Tehran's 5th season in the Pro League. They will also be competing in the Hazfi Cup & AFC Champions League. Naft Tehran is captained by Alireza Ezzati.

== First Team Squad ==
As of December 31, 2014 Note: Flags indicate national team as defined under FIFA eligibility rules; some limited exceptions apply. Players may hold more than one non-FIFA nationality.

No.	Pos.	Nation	Player
1	GK	IRI	Alireza Beiranvand ^{U23}
2	MF	IRI	Mehdi Shiri
4	DF	IRI	Siamak Kouroshi
5	DF	IRI	Mohammad Amin Hajmohammadi
6	MF	IRI	Alireza Ezzati (Captain)
7	MF	IRI	Hossein Ebrahimi
8	MF	CMR	David Wirikom
9	MF	IRI	Vahid Amiri
10	FW	IRI	Gholamreza Rezaei
11	MF	IRI	Kamal Kamyabinia
12	DF	IRI	Meysam Joudaki ^{U21}
13	DF	IRI	Vahid Hamdinejad
14	DF	IRI	Saeid Lotfi ^{U23}
16	MF	IRI	Abbas Bouazar ^{U23}
17	DF	IRI	Bahram Dabbagh ^{U23}

No.	Pos.	Nation	Player
20	DF	BRA	Leandro Padovani
22	DF	IRI	Reza Aliyari ^{U21}
23	MF	IRI	Iman Mobali
27	MF	IRI	Arash Rezavand ^{U23}
30	GK	IRI	Ahmad Gohari ^{U21}
31	FW	IRI	Ali Ghorbani
40	GK	IRI	Vahid Sheikhveisi
41	FW	IRI	Yousef Arj ^{U21}
42	DF	IRI	Ali Moghtadaei ^{U21}
43	MF	IRI	Saeid Ghomi ^{U21}
44	MF	IRI	Farid Mohammadizadeh ^{U21}
45	FW	IRI	Mohammad Pak Nahad ^{U21}
77	FW	IRI	Amir Arsalan Motahari ^{U23}
88	FW	NED	Donovan Deekman
99	GK	IRI	Ali Mohsenzadeh ^{U23}

=== Loan list ===
Note: Flags indicate national team as defined under FIFA eligibility rules; some limited exceptions apply. Players may hold more than one non-FIFA nationality.

No.	Pos.	Nation	Player
—	MF	IRI	Hamid Bou Hamdan (at Naft Masjed Soleyman until 30 May 2015)

For recent transfers, see List of Iranian football transfers summer 2014 and List of Iranian football transfers winter 2014–15.

== Transfers ==
=== In ===
No	P	Name	Age	Moving from	Ends	Transfer fee	Type	Transfer window	Quota	Source
	DF	(Iran) Siamak Kouroshi	24	Malavan		N/A	Transfer	Summer		
	LW	(Iran) Gholamreza Rezaei	29	Foolad	2016	Free	Transfer	Summer		
	CM	(Cameroon) David Wirikom	23	Rah Ahan		Free	Transfer	Summer		
	AM	(Iran) Iman Mobali	31	Esteghlal	2016	Free	Transfer	Summer		
	CB	(Iran) Meysam Joudaki	18	Esteghlal U-21	2017	Free	Transfer	Summer		
	RW	(Iran) Amir Arsalan Motahari	21	Moghavemat Tehran U-21	2017	Free	Transfer	Summer		
	DF	(Iran) Reza Aliyari	21	Moghavemat Tehran U-21	2018	Free	Transfer	Summer		
	AM	(Iran) Arash Rezavand	20	Esteghlal	2017	Free	Transfer	Summer		
	AM	(Iran) Mehd Shiri	23	Malavan		undisclosed	Transfer	Summer		
	LB	(Iran) Saeid Lotfi	21	Saba Qom	2016	Free	Transfer	Summer		
	DF	(Iran) Saeed Ghezelagchi	31	Fajr Sepasi		Free	Transfer	Summer		
	GK	(Iran) Ahmad Gohari	18	Parseh U-21	2017	Free	Transfer	Summer		
	CB	(Brazil) Leandro Padovani	30	Foolad	2015	Free	Transfer	Summer		

== Competitions ==
=== Overview ===
Competition	Started round	Current position / round	Final position / round	First match	Last match
Iran Pro League	—	—			
Hazfi Cup	—	—			
AFC Champions League	—	—			

Source: Competitions

==== Results summary ====
Overall								Home						Away					
Pld	W	D	L	GF	GA	GD	Pts	W	D	L	GF	GA	GD	W	D	L	GF	GA	GD
30	16	10	4	45	28	+17	58	10	3	2	21	8	+13	6	7	2	24	20	+4

Last updated: 15 May 2015.
Source: Ipl Stats

==== Results by round ====
Round	1	2	3	4	5	6	7	8	9	10	11	12	13	14	15	16	17	18	19	20	21	22	23	24	25	26	27	28	29	30
Ground	A	H	A	H	A	H	A	H	A	A	H	A	H	A	H	H	A	H	A	H	A	H	A	H	H	A	H	A	H	A
Result	D	L	W	W	L	D	D	W	W	D	D	D	W	W	W	W	W	D	D	W	D	W	W	W	L	L	W	W	W	D
Position	11	11	7	7	11	10	10	8	8	8	8	8	6	4	1	1	1	2	2	1	1	1	1	1	1	2	2	2	2	3

Updated to match(es) played on 15 May 2015. Source: "Ipl".
A = Away; H = Home; W = Win; D = Draw; L = Loss

==== Matches ====
Win Draw Loss Postponed

Date Round	Home	Score	Away	Location

1 August 2014 1	Persepolis	1–1	Naft Tehran	Tehran
19:40 DST+04:30	Sadeghian 11'	Report	Rezaei 27'	Stadium: Azadi Stadium; Attendance: 18,000; Referee: Ahmad Salehi

7 August 2014 2	Naft Tehran	1–2	Rah Ahan	Tehran
				Stadium: Takhti Stadium; Attendance: 2,000

15 August 2014 3	Esteghlal Khuzestan	1–2	Naft Tehran	Ahvaz
19:55	Coulibaly 86'	Summary	Ghorbani (yellow card); Kamyabinia 54'; Pouraliganji (yellow card); Wirikom 87'	Stadium: Takhti Stadium; Referee: (Iran) Mohammad Maleki

19 August 2014 4	Naft Tehran	3–0	Sepahan F.C.	Tehran
18:30	Padovani 32'; Kamyabinia 45+1'; Hamdinejad (yellow card); Ghorbani 67'	Summary	Moradmand (red card) 43'; Hajsafi (yellow card)	Stadium: Takhti Stadium; Referee: (Iran) Mohammadreza Akbarian

24 August 2014 5	Saipa	2–1	Naft Tehran	Karaj
18:30	Alizadeh (yellow card); Nozhati 68'; Sadeghi (yellow card); Zeinali 82'	Summary	Ghorbani 56'; Hajmohammadi (yellow card)	Stadium: Enghelab Stadium; Referee: (Iran) Shahin Haj Babaei

29 August 2014 6	Naft Tehran	0–0	Paykan	Tehran
18:30	Amiri (yellow card); Ghorbani (yellow card)	Summary	Daghighi (yellow card); Barani (yellow card); Keyvan Vahdani (yellow card)	Stadium: Takhti Stadium; Referee: (Iran) Alireza Faghani

4 September 2014 7	Gostaresh	1–1	Naft Tehran	Tabriz
17:30	Omid Nezamipour (yellow card); Naghizadeh 87'	Summary	Motahari 78'	Stadium: Gostaresh Foulad Stadium; Referee: (Iran) Hossein Zahedifar

11 September 2014 8	Naft Tehran	2–0	Esteghlal	Tehran
19:15	Amiri (yellow card) (goal) 1'; Motahari 87'	Summary		Stadium: Takhti Stadium; Referee: (Iran) Mehdi Seyedali

19 September 2014 9	Naft Masjed Soleyman	0–2	Naft Tehran	Masjed Soleyman
20:10		Summary	Padovani 77'; Aliyari 89'	Stadium: Behnam Mohammadi Stadium; Referee: (Iran) Payam Heidari

26 September 2014 10	Foolad	2–2	Naft Tehran	Tehran
17:00	Ansari 33'; Sharifat 80'	Summary	Amiri 38'; Amiri 67'	Stadium: Takhti Stadium; Referee: (Iran) Alireza Faghani

2 October 2014 11	Naft Tehran	0–0	Zob Ahan	Tehran
19:30		Summary	Hadadifar (yellow card)	Stadium: Takhti Stadium; Referee: (Iran) Turaj Haghveri

22 October 2014 12	Malavan	1–1	Naft Tehran	Bandar-e Anzali
16:45	Jafari (yellow card) 40' (yellow-red card); Yousefzadeh 90+4'	Summary	Rezaei 89'	Stadium: Takhti Stadium; Referee: (Iran) Yadollah Jahanbazi

31 October 2014 13	Naft Tehran	1–0	Padideh	Tehran
15:45	Padovani 35' (pen.); Ghorbani (yellow card) 50'	Summary		Stadium: Takhti Stadium; Referee: (Iran) Reza Aadel

7 November 2014 14	Saba Qom	1–2	Naft Tehran	Qom
16:00	Masoud Haghjou (yellow card); Cheshmi (yellow card); Alimohammadi (yellow card); Kalantari (yellow card) (goal) 88'	Summary	Kamyabinia (yellow card); Padovani 68'; Mobali 84'	Stadium: Yadegar-e Emam Stadium; Referee: (Iran) Alborz Hajipour

21 November 2014 15	Naft Tehran	2–1	Tractor Sazi	Tehran
15:30	Rezaei (yellow card) (goal) 43' 56'; Hamdinejad (yellow card); Pouraliganji (yellow card)	Summary	Bicaj (yellow card) (goal) 45+1'; Gordani (yellow card); Ahmadzadeh (yellow card)	Stadium: Takhti Stadium; Referee: (Iran) Seyed Zargar

1 December 2014 16	Naft Tehran	2–1	Persepolis	Tehran
15:00	Hajmohammadi (yellow card); Rezaei 43'; Kamyabinia (yellow card); Motahari 90+3'	Summary	Umaña (yellow card); Khanzadeh (yellow card); Abbaszadeh 78'	Stadium: Takhti Stadium; Referee: (Iran) Ahmad Salehi

11 December 2014 17	Rah Ahan	0–1	Naft Tehran	Tehran
15:30	Alipour (yellow card)	Summary	Amiri 90+4'	Stadium: Rah Ahan Stadium; Referee: (Iran) Omid Saeidfar

30 January 2015 18	Naft Tehran	1–1	Esteghlal Khuzestan	Tehran
16:00	Wirikom 47'; Ghorbani (yellow card)	Summary	Tayyebi (yellow card); Seifollahi (yellow card); Mahdavi (yellow card) (goal) 73'; Khosravi (yellow card) 70' (yellow-red card)	Stadium: Takhti Stadium; Referee: (Iran) Ghasem Vahedi

4 February 2015 19	Sepahan	1–1	Naft Tehran	Isfahan
17:00	Aghily 11' (pen.); Ahmadi (yellow card); Luciano Pereira Mendes (yellow card)	Summary	Beiranvand (yellow card); Rezavand (yellow card); Bouazar (yellow card) (goal) 79'	Stadium: Foolad Shahr Stadium; Referee: (Iran) Turaj Haghverdi

8 February 2015 20	Naft Tehran	3–1	Saipa	Tehran
15:30	Padovani 31' (pen.); Motahari 39' 49'; Pouraliganji (yellow card)	Summary	Moshkelpour (red card) 28'; Meydavoudi (yellow card); Nassari (yellow card); Shakouri (yellow card); Shiri 68' (pen.); Torabi (yellow card)	Stadium: Takhti Stadium; Referee: (Iran) Gholamreza Jabbari

12 February 2015 21	Paykan	1–1	Naft Tehran	Qods, Iran
15:15	Nosrati (yellow card); Shojaei (yellow card) (goal) 51'; Rahmati (yellow card)	Summary	Samuel 45+2' (o.g.); Lotfi (yellow card); Aliyari (yellow card); Bouazar (yellow card); Amiri (yellow card); Pouraliganji (red card) 88'; Beiranvand (yellow card)	Stadium: Shahre Qods Stadium; Referee: (Iran) Ali Safaei

8 March 2015 22	Naft Tehran	2–1	Gostaresh	Tehran
16:00	Ghorbani 55'; Motahari 89'		Pimenta 45+1' (pen.)	Stadium: Takhti Stadium; Referee: (Iran) Hassan Akrami

12 March 2015 23	Esteghlal	0–1	Naft Tehran	Tehran
18:30	Omranzadeh (yellow card)	Report	Padovani 81'; Kouroshi (yellow card)	Stadium: Azadi Stadium; Referee: (Iran) Seyed Hossein Zargar; Man of the Match: Padovani

3 April 2015 24	Naft Tehran	1–0	Naft Masjed Soleyman	Tehran
16:30	Ezzati 84'	Report		Stadium: Takhti Stadium; Referee: (Iran) Yadollah Jahanbazi

12 April 2015 25	Naft Tehran	0–1	Foolad	Tehran
17:30			A.Nong 67'	Stadium: Takhti Stadium; Referee: (Iran) Ahmad Salehi

16 April 2015 26	Zob Ahan	5–3	Naft Tehran	Isfahan
17:30	Rezaei 21', 49', 69'; Mohammadi 41'; Esmaeilifar 44'	Report	Kamyabinia 45+2'; Amir Arsalan Motahari 78' (pen.); Kamyabinia (yellow card); Amir Arsalan Motahari (yellow card); Ebrahimi 90+2'	Stadium: Foolad Shahr Stadium; Referee: (Iran) Seyed Hossein Zargar; Man of the Match: Kaveh Rezaei

25 April 2015 27	Naft Tehran	2–0	Malavan	Tehran
17:30	Ebrahimi 21'; Amir Arsalan Motahari 66'	Report		Stadium: Takhti Stadium

1 May 2015 28	Padideh	1–2	Naft Tehran	Mashhad
17:30	Gholami 49'	Report	Hamidinejad 23'; Ezzati (yellow card); Ezzati 90+1'	Stadium: Samen Al-Aeme Stadium; Referee: (Iran) Mohammad Hossein Zahedifar; Man of the Match: Alireza Ezzati

10 May 2015 29	Naft Tehran	1–0	Saba Qom	Tehran
17:30	Bouazar (yellow card); Hamdinejad 55' (pen.)	Summary	Bagheri (yellow card); Shakouri (yellow card)	Stadium: Takhti Stadium; Referee: (Iran) Mohammadreza Akbarian

15 May 2015 30	Tractor Sazi	3–3	Naft Tehran	Tabriz
17:30	Edinho 37'; Teymourian (yellow card) 30' (yellow-red card) (goal) 45+1'; Karimi 62'; Nariman Jahan (yellow card)	Summary	Ezzati 6'; Hamdinejad (yellow card); Amiri (yellow card); Ghorbani 76'; Padovani 81'; Kouroshi (yellow card)	Stadium: Shahand; Referee: (Iran) Alireza Faghani

=== Hazfi Cup ===
Win Draw Loss Postponed

Date Round	Home	Score	Away	Location

18 October 2014 Round of 32	Esteghlal Ahvaz	0–1	Naft Tehran	Ahvaz
18:30		Summary		Stadium: Takhti Stadium

27 October 2014 Round of 16	Naft Tehran	1–0	Shahrdari Ardabil	Tehran
15:30		Summary		Stadium: Takhti Stadium

27 November 2014 Quarter Final	Naft Tehran	1–1 (a.e.t.) (5–3 p)	Sanat Sari	Tehran
15:00		Summary		Stadium: Takhti Stadium

6 December 2014 Semi Final	Padideh	1–1 (a.e.t.) (7–8 p)	Naft Tehran	Mashhad
14:30		Summary		Stadium: Samen Al-Aeme Stadium

1 June 2015 Final	Zob Ahan	3–1	Naft Tehran	Tehran
19:15				Stadium: Azadi Stadium

=== AFC Champions League ===
Pos	Team	Pld	W	D	L	GF	GA	GD	Pts	Qualification	AIN	NAF	PAK	SHB
1	(United Arab Emirates) Al-Ain	6	3	3	0	7	2	+5	12	Advance to knockout stage	—	3–0	1–1	0–0
2	(Iran) Naft Tehran	6	2	2	2	8	8	0	8	Advance to knockout stage	1–1	—	1–1	2–1
3	(Uzbekistan) Pakhtakor	6	1	3	2	6	8	−2	6		0–1	2–1	—	0–2
4	(Saudi Arabia) Al-Shabab	6	1	2	3	5	8	−3	5		0–1	0–3	2–2	—

Source: AFC
Rules for classification: Group stage tiebreakers

Win Draw Loss Postponed

==== Play-off round ====
Date Round	Home	Score	Away	Location

17 February 2015 Play-off	Naft Tehran	1–0	(Qatar) El Jaish	Azadi Stadium, Tehran
18:00 UTC+3:30	M. Hajmohammadi (yellow card) 17'; A. Motahari 50'; G. Rezaei (yellow card) 78'	Report	Y. Muftah (yellow card) 6'	Attendance: 5,750; Referee: (Uzbekistan) Ravshan Irmatov; Man of the Match: Amir Arsalan Motahari

==== Group stage ====
Date Round	Home	Score	Away	Location

24 February 2015 1	(Uzbekistan) Pakhtakor Tashkent	2–1	(Iran) Naft Tehran	Tashkent
14:30 DST+03:30	K. Makharadze 48'; S. Karimov (red card) 51'; I. Sergeev 85'	Report	V. Amiri (yellow card) 42'; A. Ghorbani 59'	Stadium: Pakhtakor Markaziy Stadium; Attendance: 4,913; Referee: (Japan) Masaaki Iemoto; Man of the Match: Kakhi Makharadze

3 March 2015 2	(Iran) Naft Tehran	1–1	(United Arab Emirates) Al-Ain	Tehran
18:00 DST+03:30	S. Kouroshi 50'; L. Padovani (yellow card) 57'	Report	S. Mesabah (yellow card) 16'; A. Gyan 58' (pen.); A.Barman (yellow card) 90'; M. Abdulrahman (yellow card) 90'	Stadium: Takhti Stadium; Attendance: 3,300; Referee: (China) Tan Hai; Man of the Match: Alireza Beiranvand

18 March 2015 3	(Iran) Naft Tehran	2–1	(Saudi Arabia) Al-Shabab	Tehran
18:00	Beiranvand (yellow card) 43'; Hamdinejad (yellow card) 75'; Ebrahimi (yellow card) 80'; Motahari 86'; Padovani 90'	Report	Ateef (yellow card) 27'; Hazazi 43' (pen.); Al-Owais (yellow card) 45+6'; Haroon (yellow card) 49'	Stadium: Takhti Stadium; Attendance: 1560; Referee: (South Korea) Kim Dong-jin; Man of the Match: Leandro Padovani

7 April 2015 4	(Saudi Arabia) Al-Shabab	0–3	(Iran) Naft Tehran	Riyadh
21:00	Abdurahman Al-Khaibari (yellow card) 26'	Summary	Hamdinejad (yellow card) 47'; Amiri 57'; Motahari 83'; Aliyari 90'	Stadium: King Fahd International Stadium; Attendance: 5,035; Referee: (Sri Lanka) Hettikamkanamge Perera

22 April 2015 5	(Iran) Naft Tehran	1–1	(Uzbekistan) Pakhtakor	Tehran
18:00	Rezaei 25'; Motahari (yellow card) 63'; Kouroshi (yellow card) 85'	Summary	Krimets (yellow card) 24'; Kozak 36'; Karimov (yellow card) 83'	Stadium: Takhti Stadium; Attendance: 1,840; Referee: (South Korea) Kim Sang-woo (referee)

6 May 2015 6	(United Arab Emirates) Al-Ain	3–0	(Iran) Naft Tehran	Al Ain
21:00	Abdulrahman 63'; Saeed (yellow card) 71'; Gyan 74'; Ekoko 86'	Summary		Stadium: Hazza Bin Zayed Stadium; Attendance: 4,299; Referee: (Australia) Peter Green (referee)

=== Knockout Phase ===
20 May 2015 Last 16 first leg	(Iran) Naft Tehran	1–0	(Saudi Arabia) Al-Ahli	Tehran
21:00	Rezaei 34'	Summary		Stadium: Takhti Stadium; Attendance: 13,370; Referee: (Japan) Yudai Yamamoto

27 May 2015 Last 16 second leg	(Saudi Arabia) Al-Ahli	v	(Iran) Naft Tehran	Jeddah
21:00				Stadium: King Abdullah Sports City

=== Friendly Matches ===
==== Pre-season ====
Win Draw Loss Postponed

Date Round	Home	Score	Away	Location

10 July 2014	Naft Tehran	3 – 0	Rahian Kermanshah	Tehran
18:10 DST+04:30	Hossein Ebrahimi; Iman Mobali; Amir Arsalan Motehari 85'			Stadium: Naft Stadium

== Club ==
=== Official sponsors ===
• (Iran) Petro Pars

• (Iran) Merooj
