= 2015–16 Naft Tehran F.C. season =

Naft Tehran
2015–16 season
- Chairman: Mansour Ghanbarzadeh
- Manager: Ali Reza Mansourian
- Stadium: Takhti Stadium
- Iran Pro League: 5th
- Top goalscorer: League: Abbas Bouazar (2 goals); All: Abbas Bouazar (2 goals)
- Highest home attendance: 23,300 (25 August 2015 v. Al Ahli – AFC Champions League)
- Lowest home attendance: 500 (6 August 2015 v. Saba Qom)
- Average home league attendance: League: 750; All: 8,267
Home colours	Away colours

The 2014–15 season is Naft Tehran's 6th season in the Pro League. They will also be competing in the Hazfi Cup & AFC Champions League. Naft Tehran is captained by Alireza Ezzati.

== First Team Squad ==
As of December 31, 2014

Note: Flags indicate national team as defined under FIFA eligibility rules; some limited exceptions apply. Players may hold more than one non-FIFA nationality.

No.	Pos.	Nation	Player
1	GK	IRI	Alireza Beiranvand
2	MF	IRI	Mehdi Shiri
3	DF	BRA	Carlos Santos
4	DF	IRI	Jalal Hosseini
5	DF	IRI	Siamak Kouroshi
6	MF	IRI	Alireza Ezzati (Captain)
7	FW	IRI	Mehdi Momeni
8	MF	IRI	Hamid Bou Hamdan
9	MF	IRI	Arash Rezavand ^{U23}
10	MF	IRI	Vahid Amiri
11	FW	IRI	Payam Sadeghian
12	GK	IRI	Ali Mohsenzadeh ^{U23}
13	DF	IRI	Vahid Hamdinejad
14	DF	IRI	Saeid Lotfi
15	DF	IRI	Mohammad Daneshgar ^{U23}

No.	Pos.	Nation	Player
16	MF	IRI	Alireza Sabouri ^{U23}
17	FW	CMR	Aloys Nong
22	DF	IRI	Reza Aliari ^{U23}
23	MF	IRI	Iman Mobali
25	FW	IRI	Mojtaba Haghdoust ^{U21}
30	GK	IRI	Ahmad Gohari ^{U21}
32	FW	IRI	Issa Alekasir
33	DF	IRI	Meysam Joudaki ^{U21}
40	GK	IRI	Vahid Sheikhveisi
70	MF	IRI	Abbas Bouazar
76	FW	IRI	Ali Ghorbani
77	FW	IRI	Amir Arsalan Motahari ^{U23}
—	DF	IRI	Ali Moghtadaei ^{U21}
—	MF	IRI	Farid Mohammadizadeh ^{U23}
—	FW	IRI	Arshia Jabbari ^{U23}

For recent transfers, see List of Iranian football transfers summer 2015.

== Transfers ==
=== In ===
No	P	Name	Age	Moving from	Ends	Transfer fee	Type	Transfer window	Quota	Source
	DF	(Brazil) Carlos Santos	30	Zob Ahan		N/A	Transfer	Summer		
	LW	(Iran) Mehdi Momeni	29	Est. Khuzestan	2016	Free	Transfer	Summer		
	CM	(Iran) Mohammad Daneshgar	21	Fajr Sepasi		Free	Transfer	Summer		
	FW	(Iran) Issa Alekasir	25	Aluminium Hormozgan	2016	Free	Transfer	Summer		
	CB	(Iran) Jalal Hosseini	33	(Qatar) Al Ahli	2016	Free	Transfer	Summer		
	FW	(Cameroon) Aloys Nong	31	Foolad	2017	Free	Transfer	Summer		
	DF	(Iran) Alireza Sabouri		Foolad Novin	2019	Free	Transfer	Summer		

== Competitions ==
=== Persian Gulf Pro League ===
==== League table ====
Pos	Team	Pld	W	D	L	GF	GA	GD	Pts	Qualification or relegation
3	Esteghlal	30	13	13	4	43	28	+15	52	Qualification for the 2017 AFC Champions League qualifying play-offs
4	Tractor Sazi	30	13	12	5	43	27	+16	51	
5	Naft Tehran	30	13	10	7	30	21	+9	49	
6	Zob Ahan	30	11	13	6	38	26	+12	46	Qualification for the 2017 AFC Champions League group stage (Note: Zob Ahan secured qualification for the 2017 AFC Champions League through winning the 2015–16 Hazfi Cup.)
7	Saba Qom	30	9	15	6	30	24	+6	42	

Updated to match(es) played on 13 May 2016. Source: IPL Stats
Rules for classification: 1) points; 2) goal difference; 3) number of goals scored.

==== Results summary ====
Overall								Home						Away					
Pld	W	D	L	GF	GA	GD	Pts	W	D	L	GF	GA	GD	W	D	L	GF	GA	GD
2	0	2	0	1	1	0	2	0	1	0	1	1	0	0	1	0	0	0	0

Last updated: 15 May 2015.
Source: Ipl Stats

==== Results by round ====
Round	1	2	3	4	5	6	7	8	9	10	11	12	13	14	15	16	17	18	19	20	21	22	23	24	25	26	27	28	29	30
Ground	A	H	A	H	A	H	A	A	H	A	H	A	H	A	H	H	A	H	A	H	A	H	H	A	H	A	H	A	H	A
Result	D	D	L	D	L	D	D	W	W	D	L	D	W	W	L	W	L	D	W	L	W	W	L	W						
Position	8	10	12	12	15	15	15	14	13	12	12	12	12	10	8	9	8	8	8	6	6	7	6	6	5					

Updated to match(es) played on 15 May 2015. Source: "Ipl".
A = Away; H = Home; W = Win; D = Draw; L = Loss

==== Matches ====
Win Draw Loss Postponed

Date Round	Home	Score	Away	Location

15 May 2015 1	Tractor Sazi	0–0	Naft Tehran	Tabriz
17:30		Summary	Nong (yellow card)	Stadium: Shahand; Attendance: 15,000; Referee: Seyed Hossein Zargar

7 August 2014 2	Naft Tehran	1–1	Saba Qom	Tehran
		Report		Stadium: Takhti Stadium; Attendance: 500; Referee: Alborz Hajipour

15 August 2014 3	Siah Jamegan	1–0	Naft Tehran	Mashhad
19:55

19 August 2015 4	Naft Tehran	3–3	Malavan	Tehran
				Stadium: Takhti Stadium; Attendance: 1,000

21 September 2015 5	Esteghlal	2–1	Naft Tehran	Tehran
	Fakhredini 52'; Ebrahimi (pen.), 56'	Report	C.Santos (yellow card); Nong (yellow card); Nong 65'	Stadium: Azadi Stadium; Referee: Yadollah Jahanbazi

26 September 2015 6	Zob Ahan	0–0	Naft Tehran	Isfahan
		Report	Kouroshi (yellow card)	Stadium: Foolad Shahr Stadium; Referee: Mouood Bonyadifar

16 October 2015 7	Gostaresh	1–1	Naft Tehran	Tabriz
	Nazemipour 69'		Nong 46'	Stadium: Gostaresh Foulad Stadium; Attendance: 300; Referee: Gholamreza Jabbari

21 October 2015 8	Naft Tehran	2–0	Rah Ahan	Tehran
	Amiri 24'; Motahari 89'	Report	Karimi (yellow card)	Stadium: Takhti Stadium; Attendance: 100; Referee: Reza Heydari

October 27, 2015 9	Padideh	1–2	Naft Tehran	Mashhad
	Kheiri 49'		Bou Hamdan 26'; Sadeghian (pen.), 56'	Stadium: Samen Stadium; Attendance: 500; Referee: Saeid Salehi

October 31, 2015 10	Naft Tehran	0–0	Esteghlal Khuzestan	Tehran
				Stadium: Takhti Stadium; Attendance: 300; Referee: Safollah Pour

11 November 2015 11	Sepahan	2–1	Naft Tehran	Isfahan
	Sharifi 45+'; Aghili 89'	Report	Ghorbani 36'	Stadium: Fooladshahr Stadium; Attendance: 3000; Referee: Alireza Faghani

30 November 2015 12	Naft Tehran	1–1	Persepolis	Tehran
	Daneshgar 73'		Kamandani 40'	Stadium: Takhti Stadium; Attendance: 10000; Referee: Mohammad Reza Akbarian

13 December 2015 13	Foolad	1–2	Naft Tehran	Ahvaz
	Daghagheleh 17'; Sasan Ansari (yellow card)	Report	Nong 51'; Amiri 79'	Stadium: Ghadir Stadium; Referee: Seyed Hossein Zargar

17 December 2015 14	Naft Tehran	1–0	Saipa	Tehran
	Nong 65'	Report	Rezaei (yellow card)	Stadium: Takhti Stadium; Attendance: 200; Referee: Saeid Bakhshizadeh

28 December 2015 15	Naft Tehran	0–1	Tractor Sazi	Tehran
			Aghaei 45'	Stadium: Takhti Stadium; Attendance: 500; Referee: Yadollah Jahanbazi

1 January 2016 16	Saba Qom	1–3	Naft Tehran	Qods
	Alimohammadi 90+3'		Ghorbani 7', 38'; Ghazi 64' (o.g.)	Stadium: Yadegar-e Emam Stadium (Qom); Attendance: 1000; Referee: Tooraj Haghverdi

29 January 2016 17	Naft Tehran	1–2	Siah Jamegan	Tehran
	Motahari (pen.), 34'		Enayati (pen.), 50'; Motahari 83' (o.g.)	Stadium: Takhti Stadium; Attendance: 200; Referee: Mahdi Seyed Ali

3 February 2016 18	Malavan	0–0	Naft Tehran	Bandar-e Anzali
		Report		Stadium: Takhti Stadium; Referee: Seyed Ahmad Salehi

14 February 2016 19	Naft Tehran	1–0	Esteghlal	Tehran
	Omranzadeh 9' (o.g.)	Report		Stadium: Takhti Stadium; Attendance: 10000; Referee: Mohammad Reza Akbarian

20	v

21	v

22	v

23	v

24	v

25	v

26	v

27	v

28	v

29	v

30	v

=== Hazfi Cup ===
Win Draw Loss Postponed

Date Round	Home	Score	Away	Location

v

v

v

v

v

=== Friendly Matches ===
==== Pre-season ====
Win Draw Loss Postponed

Date Round	Home	Score	Away	Location

10 July 2014	Naft Tehran	3 – 0	Rahian Kermanshah	Tehran
18:10 DST+04:30	Hossein Ebrahimi; Iman Mobali; Amir Arsalan Motehari 85'			Stadium: Naft Stadium

== Club ==
=== Kit ===
Supplier: Merooj

Home Kit

Source: "Naft Tehran's current kit". Archived from the original on July 23, 2013.

=== Official sponsors ===
• (Iran) Petro Pars

• (Iran) Merooj
