= List of Naft Tehran F.C. seasons =

This is a list of seasons played by Naft Tehran Football Club in Iranian and Asian football, from 1973 to the most recent completed season. It details the club's achievements in major competitions, and the top scorers for each season. Top scorers in bold were also the top scorers in the Iranian league that season.

== Seasons ==
Season	League									Hazfi Cup	Leagues Top goalscorer		Manager	Notes
Season	Division	P	W	D	L	F	A	Pts	Pos	Hazfi Cup	Name	Goals	Manager	Notes
1973-74	TFL	11	3	2	6	10	14	8	10th					
1974-75	TFL	13	7	4	2	13	5	17	3rd					
1975-76	TFL	13	8	2	3	17	6	18	3rd					
1981-82	TFL	13	2	5	6	10	17	9	13th	**Not held**			Aref Seyed Alikhani	
1982-83	TFL	17	8	2	7	16	18	18	8th	**Not held**			Aref Seyed Alikhani	
1983-84	TFL	17	6	5	6	12	11	17	8th	**Not held**			Aref Seyed Alikhani	
1984-85	TFL	**Did not finish**								**Not held**			Aref Seyed Alikhani	
1985-86	TFL	9	1	4	4	6	10	6	7th	**Not held**			Aref Seyed Alikhani	
1986-87	TFL	8	3	0	5	9	8	6	5th				Aref Seyed Alikhani	
1987-88	TFL	17	1	8	8	5	17	10	17th				Aref Seyed Alikhani	Relegated to the Tehran Football League's 2nd Div.
1988-89	TFL2	17	5	11	1	27	14	26	5th					
1989-90	TFL2	14	7	5	2	13	9	19	4th					
1990-91	TFL2	17	4	6	7	18	18	14	14th					Relegated to the Tehran Football League's 3rd Div.
1991-92	TFL3													Promoted to the Tehran Football League's 2nd Div.
1992-93	TFL2								**Not held**					
1993-94	TFL2													
1994-95	TFL2													
1995-96	TFL2													
1996-97	TFL2													
1997-98	TFL2									**Not held**				
1998-99	TFL2													
1999-00	TFL2													
2000-01	TFL2													Promoted to the Tehran Province league
2001-02	TFL													
2002-03	TFL													
2003-04	TFL	13	7	3	3	20	15	24	4th				Nasser Faryadshiran	
2004-05	TFL	15	10	1	4	30	18	34	**1st**				Nasser Faryadshiran	Promoted to the Iran Football's 3rd Division
2005-06	Div 3	22	15	5	2	40	25	50	**1st**				Nasser Faryadshiran	Promoted to the Iran Football's 2nd Division
2006-07	Div 2	26	10	13	3	32	16	43	5th				Mehdi Dinvarzadeh	
2007-08	Div 2	26	11	10	5	30	18	43	7th	First round			Mehdi Dinvarzadeh	
2008-09	Div 2	16	12	2	2	36	14	38	**1st**	Round of 16			Mehdi Dinvarzadeh	Promoted to the Azadegan League
2009-10	Div 1	26	13	10	3	33	16	49	**1st**	Third round	Akbar Saghiri	7	Nader Dastneshan	Promoted to the Iran Pro League
2010-11	IPL	34	7	15	12	38	44	36	13th	Round of 32	Ferreira	10	Hossein Faraki	
2011-12	IPL	34	13	10	11	36	38	49	5th	Round of 32	Iman Mousavi	8	Hossein Faraki	
2012-13	IPL	34	14	13	7	42	29	55	5th	Round of 16	Yaghoub Karimi	10	Mansour Ebrahimzadeh	
2013-14	IPL	30	15	9	6	39	23	54	3rd	Round of 16	Reza Norouzi	11	Yahya Golmohammadi	
2014-15	IPL												Ali Reza Mansourian	

=== Key ===
- P = Played
- W = Games won
- D = Games drawn
- L = Games lost
- F = Goals for
- A = Goals against
- Pts = Points
- Pos = Final position
- TFL = Tehran Football League
- TFL2 = Tehran Football League's 2nd Div.
- TFL3 = Tehran Football League's 3rd Div.
- Div 3 = 3rd Division
- Div 2 = 2nd Division
- Div 2 = Azadegan League
- IPL = Iran Pro League

Champions	Runners-up
