= 2015 Hazfi Cup final =

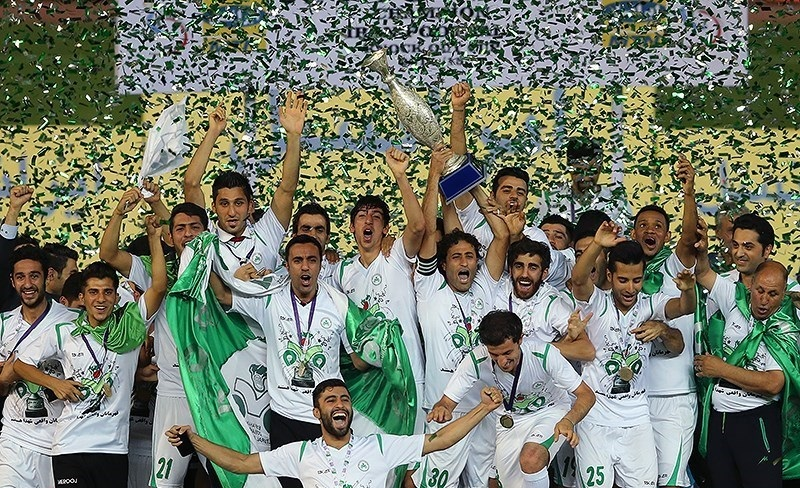
- Event: 2014–15 Hazfi Cup
Zob Ahan	Naft Tehran
3	1
- Date: 1 June 2015
- Venue: Takhti Stadium, Tehran
- Man of the Match: Ghasem Hadadifar
- Fans' Man of the Match: Mehdi Rajabzadeh
- Referee: Mohsen Torky
- Attendance: 27,789
- Weather: Partly Cloudy; 28 °C (82 °F); 9% humidity

The 2015 Hazfi Cup final was the 28th final since 1975. The match was contested by Zob Ahan and Naft Tehran at Takhti Stadium in Tehran. The match was played on 1 June 2015 and was the final match of the competition. Zob Ahan won 3–1 and won their third title in the competition. They also qualified for the group stages of the 2016 AFC Champions League.

== Format ==
The tie was contested over one legs, simply to last edition. If the teams could still not be separated, then extra time would have been played with a penalty shootout (taking place if the teams were still level after that).

== Pre-match ==
=== Match history ===
This was Zob Ahan's fourth Hazfi final and Naft Tehran's first appearance in the final match of the tournament. Zob Ahan lastly won the cup in 2002–03 and 2008–09. Their other final appearance was in 2000–01 season where they lost to Fajr Sepasi.

=== Ticketing ===
Ticket prices for the final was 2,000 toman. 50% of the stadium were belongs to the Zob Ahan's fans and others were belong to Naft Tehran's fans.

=== Venue ===
The final was decided with draw which 30,122 capacity Takhti Stadium (the Naft Tehran's home Stadium) was announced as the venue for the final.

=== Officials ===
FIFA listed referee, Mohsen Torky was announced as the final match referee by IRIFF's referees committee. Mohammad Reza Abolfazli and Hassan Zahiri assisted him. was also fourth official.

== Details ==
1 June 2015
18:30 (UTC+4:30)

Zob Ahan	3 – 1	Naft Tehran
Hadadifar 48'; Rajabzadeh 50'; Rezaei 80'	Report	Amiri 46'

Takhti Stadium, Tehran
Attendance: 27,789
Referee: Mohsen Torky

Zob Ahan	Naft Tehran

Zob Ahan: 3-4-3
GK	12	(Iran) Mohammad Rashid Mazaheri
DF	2	(Iran) Hadi Mohammadi
DF	3	(Brazil) Carlos Santos
DF	18	(Lebanon) Ali Hamam
MF	8	(Iran) Ghasem Hadadifar (c)
MF	15	(Iran) Ehsan Pahlevan
MF	19	(Iran) Mehrdad Ghanbari
MF	26	(Iran) Mehdi Mehdipour
FW	23	(Iran) Danial Esmaeilifar
FW	30	(Iran) Mehdi Rajabzadeh
FW	99	(Iran) Kaveh Rezaei
Manager:
(Iran) Yahya Golmohammadi

Naft Tehran: 3-5-2
GK	1	(Iran) Alireza Beiranvand
DF	5	(Iran) Amin Hajmohammadi
DF	14	(Iran) Saeid Lotfi
DF	20	(Brazil) Leonardo Padovani
MF	6	(Iran) Alireza Ezzati (c)
MF	9	(Iran) Vahid Amiri
MF	11	(Iran) Kamal Kamyabinia
MF	23	(Iran) Iman Mobali
MF	27	(Iran) Arash Rezavand
FW	10	(Iran) Gholamreza Rezaei
FW	31	(Iran) Ali Ghorbani
Manager:
(Iran) Alireza Mansourian

Man of the match

- (Iran) Ghasem Hadadifar (Zob Ahan)

Assistant referees:
Mohammad Reza Abolfazli
Hassan Zahiri
Fourth official:

Match rules:

- 90 minutes
- 30 minutes of extra-time if necessary
- Penalty shoot-out if scores still level
- Seven named substitutes
- Maximum of three substitutions

== See also ==
- Persian Gulf League 2014–15
- 2014–15 Azadegan League
- 2014–15 Iran Football's 2nd Division
- 2014–15 Iran Football's 3rd Division
- 2014–15 Hazfi Cup
- Iranian Super Cup
- 2014–15 Iranian Futsal Super League
