= 2014–15 Hazfi Cup =

Jame Azadsazi Khorramshahr
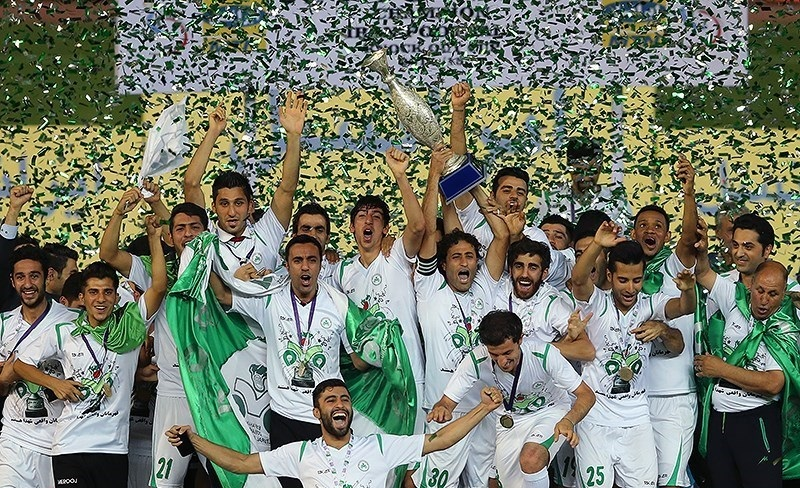

Tournament details
- Country: Iran
- Dates: 1 September 2014 – 1 June 2015
- Teams: 102

Final positions
- Champions: Zob Ahan (3rd title)
- Runners-up: Naft Tehran

Tournament statistics
- Matches played: 101
- Goals scored: 300 (2.97 per match)
- Top goal scorer(s): (Iran) Mehdi Rajabzadeh (4 goals)

Awards
- Best player: (Iran) Ghasem Hadadifar

The 2014–15 Hazfi Cup was the 28th season of the Iranian football knockout competition. Tractor Sazi was the defending champion but was eliminated by Padideh in the quarter-finals. The competition started on 1 September 2014 and ended on 1 June 2015. Zob Ahan won their third title, defeating Naft Tehran in the final.

== Participating teams ==
Totally 102 teams participated in the 2014–15 season. These teams were divided into four main groups, including 16 teams of the Iran Pro League, 24 teams of the Azadegan League, 28 teams of the Iran Football's 2nd Division and 34 teams from the Provincial League.

== First stage ==
In the first stage of "2014–15 Hazfi Cup", 96 teams were present. Three rounds were played in this stage and finally 13 teams qualified for the second stage.

=== First round ===
The first round started with 34 teams that contained the champions of each province in the Provincial League, in addition to Khoramshahr and Kish Island's champion and Tehran's runner-up. Six teams were given byes to the second round.

1 September 2014 1	Shahin Ilam	w/o	Shahrdari Bam	Ilam
16:00 DST+03:30				Stadium: Ilam Stadium
Note: Shahin Ilam withdrew

1 September 2014 2	Ghahreman East Azerbaijan	w/o	Shahrdari Chamkhaleh	Urumia
16:00 DST+03:30				Stadium: Urumia Stadium
Note: Ghahreman East Azerbaijan withdrew

1 September 2014 3	Ettihad Novin	w/o	Esteghlal Kalak	Tehran
16:00 DST+03:30				Stadium: Azad Stadium
Note: Etiihad Novin withdrew

1 September 2014 4	Keivan Morgh	w/o	Ghahreman Lorestan	Mahabad
16:00 DST+03:30				Stadium: Keivan Stadium
Note: Ghahreman Lorestan withdrew

1 September 2014 5	Zagros Yasuj	w/o	Ghahreman South Khorasan	Yasuj
16:00 DST+03:30				Stadium: Zagros Stadium
Note: Ghahreman South Khorasan withdrew

1 September 2014 6	Namayandeh Khoramshahr	w/o	Abkar Gostar Paj	Khoramshahr
16:00 DST+03:30				Stadium: Khoramshahr Stadium
Note: Namayandeh Khoramshahr withdrew

1 September 2014 7	Ghahreman Kish	w/o	Abharrood	Kish
16:00 DST+03:30				Stadium: Kish Olympic Stadium
Note: Abharrood withdrew

1 September 2014 8	Shahin Bandar Gaz	w/o	Safir Gofteman	Bandar Gaz
16:00 DST+03:30				Stadium: Bandar Gaz Stadium
Note: Safir Gofteman withdrew

1 September 2014 9	Arvand	w/o	Ghahreman Yazd	Bandar Abbas
16:00 DST+03:30				Stadium: Arvand Stadium
Note: Ghahreman Yazd withdrew

1 September 2014 10	Shahin Karokla	w/o	Ghahreman Khouzestan	Babol
16:00 DST+03:30				Stadium: Babol Stadium
Note: Ghahreman Khouzestan withdrew

1 September 2014 11	Ghahreman Hamedan	w/o	Kian Bakhtiari	Hamedan
16:00 DST+03:30				Stadium: Ali Sina Stadium
Note: Ghahreman Hamedan withdrew

1 September 2014 12	Parseh Shiraz	1–2	Milan Arak	Shiraz
16:00 DST+03:30				Stadium: Parseh Stadium; Attendance: 500

1 September 2014 13	Astoo Abyek	0–1	Shohadaye Artesh	Qazvin
16:00 DST+03:30				Stadium: Shahid Rajai Stadium; Attendance: 13,000

1 September 2014 14	Payam Choghadak	2–1	Saba Noor	Bushehr
16:30 DST+03:30				Stadium: Bushehr Stadium; Attendance: 1,000

=== Second round ===
For the second round, twenty qualified teams faced each other and 10 teams qualified for the third round.

7 September 2014 15	Shohadaye Artesh	w/o	Arvand	Isfahan
16:00 DST+03:30				Stadium: Shahid Dastgheib Stadium
Note: Arvand withdrew

7 September 2014 16	Shahrdari Bam	w/o	Zorat Karan	Bam
16:00 DST+03:30				Stadium: New Bam Stadium
Note: Zorat Karan withdrew

7 September 2014 17	Safir Shahroud	w/o	Keivan Morgh	Shahroud
16:00 DST+03:30				Stadium: Shahroud Stadium
Note: Safir Shahroud withdrew

7 September 2014 18	Zagros Yasuj	w/o	Moghavemat Kangavar	Yasuj
16:00 DST+03:30				Stadium: Zagros Stadium
Note: Moghavemat Kangavar withdrew

7 September 2014 19	Abkar Gostar Paj	w/o	Ghahreman Kish	Fariman
16:00 DST+03:30				Stadium: Shahid Rafouni Stadium
Note: Ghahreman Kish withdrew

7 September 2014 20	Milan Ark	w/o	Montakhab Saravan	Arak
16:00 DST+03:30				Stadium: Imam Khomeini Stadium
Note: Montakhab Saravan withdrew

7 September 2014 21	Parag Tehran	w/o	Payam Choghadak	Tehran
16:00 DST+03:30				Stadium: Esteghlal Jonoob Stadium
Note: Parag Tehran withdrew

7 September 2014 22	Esteghlal Kalak	2–1	Shahrdari Chamkhaleh	Karaj
16:00 DST+03:30				Stadium: Enghelab Stadium; Attendance: 1,500

7 September 2014 23	Shahrdari Jajarm	3–1	Shahin Bandar Gaz	Jajarm
16:00 DST+03:30				Stadium: Amir Kabir Stadium; Attendance: 1,000

7 September 2014 24	Kian Bakhtiari	1–0	Shahin Karokla	Shahrekord
16:00 DST+03:30				Stadium: Enghelab Stadium; Attendance: 500

=== Third round ===
For the third round, ten qualified teams from second round faced 24 teams from Azadegan League and 28 from Iran Football's 2nd Division. Two teams were given byes to the fourth round.

17 September 2014 25	Shahrdari Bam	0–8	Foolad Novin	Bam
16:00 DST+03:30				Stadium: New Bam Stadium; Attendance: 700

17 September 2014 26	Giti Pasand	3–3 (a.e.t.) (5–6 p)	Parseh Tehran	Mobarakeh
16:00 DST+03:30				Stadium: Daneshgah Azad Mobarakeh Stadium; Attendance: 200

17 September 2014 27	Fajr Jam Bushehr	w/o	Caspian Qazvin	Bushehr
16:00 DST+03:30				Stadium: Shohada Stadium
Note: Fajr Jam Bushehr withdrew

17 September 2014 28	Fajr Sepasi	1–0	Esteghlal Kalak	Shiraz
16:00 DST+03:30				Stadium: Hafezieh Stadium; Attendance: 2,000

17 September 2014 29	Hafari Ahvaz	w/o	Iranjavan Khoormooj	Ahvaz
16:00 DST+03:30				Stadium: Takhti Stadium
Note: Hafari Ahvaz withdrew

17 September 2014 30	Damash Gilan	w/o	Badr Hormozgan	Rasht
16:00 DST+03:30				Stadium: Dr. Azodi Stadium
Note: Both Damash Gilan and Badr Hormozgan withdrew

17 September 2014 31	Etka Gorgan	w/o	Payam Choghadak	Gorgan
16:00 DST+03:30				Stadium: Karim Abad Stadium
Note: Etka Gorgan withdrew

17 September 2014 32	Nassaji Mazandaran	2–1	Milan Arak	Qaem Shahr
16:00 DST+03:30	Teymouri 65'; Dastneshan 71'		Derakhshan 80'	Stadium: Vatani Stadium; Attendance: 0

17 September 2014 33	Alvand Hamedan	w/o	Gol Gohar	Hamedan
16:00 DST+03:30				Stadium: Qods Stadium
Note: Alvand Hamedan withdrew

17 September 2014 34	Aluminium Hormozgan	w/o	Niroo Zamini	Bandar Abbas
16:00 DST+03:30				Stadium: Persian Gulf Stadium
Note: Aluminium withdrew

17 September 2014 35	Foolad Yazd	w/o	Shahrdari Jooybar	Yazd
16:00 DST+03:30				Stadium: Shahid Nassiri Stadium
Note: Shahrdari Jooybar withdrew

17 September 2014 36	Mes Rafsanjan	w/o	Khalkhal Dasht	Rafsanjan
16:00 DST+03:30				Stadium: Shohadaye Noushabad Stadium
Note: Khalkhal Dasht withdrew

17 September 2014 37	Kargar Boneh Gaz	w/o	Shahrdari Dezful	Bushehr
16:00 DST+03:30				Stadium: Boneh Gaz Stadium
Note: Shahrdari Dezful withdrew

17 September 2014 38	Zob Ahan Novin	2–2 (a.e.t.) (2–4 p)	Pas Hamedan	Isfahan
16:00 DST+03:30				Stadium: Fooladshahr Stadium; Attendance: 1,000

17 September 2014 39	Be'sat Kermanshah	4–0	Safir Shahrud	Kermanshah
16:00 DST+03:30				Stadium: Kermanshah Stadium; Attendance: 200

17 September 2014 40	Rahian Kermanshah	w/o	Zagros Yasuj	Kermanshah
16:00 DST+03:30				Stadium: Azadi Stadium
Note: Rahian Kermanshah withdrew

17 September 2014 41	Esteghlal Ahvaz	w/o	Iranjavan	Ahvaz
16:00 DST+03:30				Stadium: Takhti Stadium
Note: Iranjavan withdrew

17 September 2014 42	Gahar Zagros	w/o	Esteghlal B	Dorood
16:00 DST+03:30				Stadium: Takhti Stadium
Note: Gahar Zagros withdrew

17 September 2014 43	Shahrdari Ardabil	w/o	Yazd Louleh	Ardabil
16:00 DST+03:30				Stadium: Ali Daei Stadium
Note: Yazd Louleh withdrew

17 September 2014 44	Sanat Sari	w/o	Mes Soongoun	Sari
16:00 DST+03:30				Stadium: Shohada Stadium
Note: Mes Soongoun withdrew

17 September 2014 45	Shahrdari Bandar Abbas	w/o	Aboomoslem	Bandar Abbas
16:00 DST+03:30				Stadium: Takhti Stadium
Note: Shahrdari Bandar Abbas withdrew

17 September 2014 46	Persepolis Ganaveh	w/o	Shahrdari Tabriz	Ganaveh
16:00 DST+03:30				Stadium: Shahid Seraji Stadium
Note: Both Persepolis Ganaveh and Shahrdari withdrew

17 September 2014 47	Bahman Shiraz	5–0	Abkar Gostar Paj	Shiraz
16:00 DST+03:30				Stadium: Shahid Dastgheib Stadium; Attendance: 800

17 September 2014 48	Sanat Naft Novin	w/o	Shahrdari Jajarm	Abadan
16:00 DST+03:30				Stadium: Takhti Stadium
Note: Sanat Naft Novin withdrew

17 September 2014 49	Khoneh Be Khoneh	w/o	Mes Kerman	Babol
16:00 DST+03:30				Stadium: New Babol Stadium
Note: Mes Kerman withdrew

17 September 2014 50	Naft Gachsaran	w/o	Sanat Naft	Gachsaran
16:00 DST+03:30				Stadium: Naft Gachsaran Stadium
Note: Sanat Naft withdrew

17 September 2014 51	Shahrdari Yasuj	w/o	Shohadaye Artesh	Yasuj
16:00 DST+03:30				Stadium: Takhti Stadium
Note: Shahrdari Yasuj withdrew

17 September 2014 52	Persepolis Shomal	w/o	Siah Jamegan	Qaem Shahr
16:00 DST+03:30				Stadium: Vatan Stadium
Note: Persepolis Shomal withdrew

17 September 2014 53	Karun Khuzestan	w/o	Machine Sazi	Ahvaz
16:00				Stadium: Takhti Stadium
Note: Karun Khuzestan withdrew

17 September 2014 54	Sepidrood Rasht	w/o	Kian Bakhtiari	Rasht
16:00 DST+03:30				Stadium: Dr. Azodi Stadium
Note: Sepidrood withdrew

=== Fourth round ===
28 September 2014 55	Payam Mashhad	0–1	Foolad Novin	Mashhad
14:45 DST+03:30				Stadium: Takhti Stadium; Attendance: 1,000

28 September 2014 56	Parseh Tehran	1–0	Caspian Qazvin	Tehran
14:45 DST+03:30				Stadium: Kargaran Stadium; Attendance: 2,000

28 September 2014 57	Fajr Sepasi	2–1	Iranjavan Khoormooj	Shiraz
14:45 DST+03:30				Stadium: Hafezieh Stadium; Attendance: 5,000

28 September 2014 58	Payam Choghadak	w/o	Damash Gilan	Bushehr
14:45 DST+03:30				Stadium: Shahid Beheshti Stadium

28 September 2014 59	Nassaji Mazandaran	1–3 (a.e.t.)	Gol Gohar	Qaem Shahr
14:45 DST+03:30				Stadium: Vatani Stadium; Attendance: 13,000

28 September 2014 60	Niroo Zamini	2–0	Foolad Yazd	Tehran
14:45 DST+03:30				Stadium: Takhti Stadium; Attendance: 200

28 September 2014 61	Mes Rafsanjan	0–4	Kargar Boneh Gaz	Rafsanjan
14:45 DST+03:30				Stadium: Shohadaye Noushabad Stadium; Attendance: 9,000

28 September 2014 62	Pas Hamedan	4–0	Be'sat Kermanshah	Hamedan
14:45 DST+03:30				Stadium: Qods Stadium; Attendance: 8,000

28 September 2014 63	Zagros Yasuj	0–1	Esteghlal Ahvaz	Yasuj
14:45 DST+03:30				Stadium: Zagros Stadium; Attendance: 2,000

28 September 2014 64	Esteghlal B	1–2	Shahrdari Ardabil	Tehran
14:45 DST+03:30				Stadium: Nasser Hejazi Stadium; Attendance: 3,000

28 September 2014 65	Sanat Sari	w/o	Aboomoslem	Sari
14:45 DST+03:30				Stadium: Shohadaye Sari Stadium

28 September 2014 66	Bahman Shiraz	w/o	Shahrdari Tabriz	Shiraz
14:45 DST+03:30				Stadium: Shahid Dastgheib Stadium

28 September 2014 67	Shahrdari Jajarm	0–11	Khoneh Be Khoneh	Jajarm
14:45 DST+03:30				Stadium: Jajarm Stadium; Attendance: 1,500

28 September 2014 68	Naft Gachsaran	w/o	Shohadaye Artesh	Gachsaran
14:45 DST+03:30				Stadium: Naft Gachsaran Stadium

28 September 2014 69	Siah Jamegan	w/o	Karun Khuzestan	Mashhad
14:45 DST+03:30				Stadium: Takhti Stadium

28 September 2014 70	Naft Omidiyeh	w/o	Kian Bakhtiari	Omidiyeh
14:45 DST+03:30				Stadium: Shahrdari Omidiyeh Stadium

== Second stage ==
=== Bracket ===
Round of 32
H	Foolad Novin	0
A	Esteghlal	1
H	Parseh Tehran	1
A	Foolad	0
H	Fajr Sepasi	1
A	Esteghlal Khuzestan	3
H	Zob Ahan	3
A	Payam Choghadak	0
H	Gol Gohar	1
A	Sepahan	0
H	Naft Masjed Soleyman	2
A	Niroo Zamini	0
H	Persepolis	3
A	Kargar Boneh Gaz	0
H	Rah Ahan	2
A	Pas Hamedan	1
H	Esteghlal Ahvaz	0
A	Naft Tehran	1
H	Shahrdari Ardabil	1
A	Saba Qom	0
H	Sanat Sari	0(3)
A	Malavan	0(1)
H	Paykan	2
A	Bahman Shiraz	1
H	Padideh	2
A	Khoneh Be Khoneh	1
H	Gostaresh	3
A	Shohadaye Artesh	0
H	Tractor Sazi	4
A	Karun Khuzestan	0
H	Kian Bakhtiari	0
A	Saipa	6

Round of 16
H	Esteghlal	4
A	Parseh Tehran	2
H	Esteghlal Khuzestan	2
A	Zob Ahan	3
A	Gol Gohar	0(4)
H	Naft Masjed Soleyman	0(2)
H	Persepolis	1(4)
A	Rah Ahan	1(1)
H	Naft Tehran	1
A	Shahrdari Ardabil	0
H	Sanat Sari	2
A	Paykan	0
A	Padideh	2
H	Gostaresh	1
A	Tractor Sazi	0(3)
H	Saipa	0(1)

Quarter-Final
A	Esteghlal	2(0)
H	Zob Ahan	2(3)
H	Gol Gohar	1(2)
A	Persepolis	1(3)
H	Naft Tehran	1(5)
A	Sanat Sari	1(3)
A	Padideh	2
H	Tractor Sazi	1

Semi-Final
A	Zob Ahan	2
H	Persepolis	1
A	Naft Tehran	1(8)
H	Padideh	1(7)

Final
A	Zob Ahan	3
H	Naft Tehran	1

Note: H: Home team, A: Away team

=== Fifth round (round of 32) ===
The 16 teams from Iran Pro League entered the competition in this round.

18 October 2014 71	Foolad Novin	0–1 (a.e.t.)	Esteghlal	Ahvaz
19:00 DST+03:30			Ramezani 109'	Stadium: Ghadir Stadium; Attendance: 11,000

17 October 2014 72	Parseh Tehran	1–0	Foolad	Tehran
14:00 DST+03:30	Taheri 34'			Stadium: Kargaran Stadium; Attendance: 500

16 October 2014 73	Fajr Sepasi	1–3	Esteghlal Khuzestan	Shiraz
14:30 DST+03:30	Mardani 67'		Majidi 17'; Momeni 34'; Diawara 44'	Stadium: Hafezieh Stadium; Attendance: 7,000

16 October 2014 74	Zob Ahan	3–0	Payam Choghadak	Isfahan
16:50 DST+03:30	Rajabzadeh 44'; Imani 45+4'; Pahlevan 75'			Stadium: Fooladshahr Stadium; Attendance: 1,000

18 October 2014 75	Gol Gohar	1–0 (a.e.t.)	Sepahan	Sirjan
14:00 DST+03:30	Jomehzadeh 105' (pen.)			Stadium: Gol Gohar Stadium; Attendance: 2,000

16 October 2014 76	Naft Masjed Soleyman	2–0	Niroo Zamini	Masjed Soleyman
17:00 DST+03:30	Bou Hamdan 5' (pen.); Maranhão 15'			Stadium: Behnam Mohammadi Stadium; Attendance: 8,000

16 October 2014 77	Persepolis	3–0	Kargar Boneh Gaz	Tehran
16:50 DST+03:30	Abbaszadeh 15'; Sadeghian 77' (pen.); Alishah 85'			Stadium: Azadi Stadium; Attendance: 1,000

16 October 2014 78	Rah Ahan	2–1	Pas Hamedan	Tehran
14:30 DST+03:30	Irannejad 46'; Hosseinpour 84'		Azarpad 90'	Stadium: Takhti Stadium; Attendance: 100

18 October 2014 79	Esteghlal Ahvaz	0–1	Naft Tehran	Ahvaz
17:00 DST+03:30			Padovani 17' (pen.)	Stadium: Takhti Stadium; Attendance: 19,000

16 October 2014 80	Shahrdari Ardabil	1–0	Saba Qom	Ardabil
14:00 DST+03:30	Shahbazi 84'			Stadium: Ali Daei Stadium; Attendance: 20,000

17 October 2014 81	Sanat Sari	0–0 (a.e.t.) (3–2 p)	Malavan	Sari
14:30 DST+03:30				Stadium: Shohadaye Sari Stadium; Attendance: 5,000
	Penalties
	Farhangdoust (penalty scored); Mahmoudi (penalty missed); Faraji (penalty missed); Dastan (penalty missed); Farhadi (penalty scored); Aboljafari (penalty scored)		Zare (penalty scored); Yousefzadeh (penalty scored); Gholamin (penalty missed); Zahmatkesh (penalty missed); Maeboodi (penalty missed); Jafari (penalty missed)

17 October 2014 82	Paykan	2–1 (a.e.t.)	Bahman Shiraz	Qods
14:30 DST+03:30	Asgari 31'; S. Yazdani 107'		H. Yazdani 37'	Stadium: Shahre Qods Stadium; Attendance: 9,000

17 October 2014 83	Padideh	2–1	Khoneh Be Khoneh	Mashhad
14:00 DST+03:30	Gharibi 7'; Shakeri 79'		Najjafi 28'	Stadium: Samen Stadium; Attendance: 34,000

16 October 2014 84	Gostaresh	3–0	Shohadaye Artesh	Tabriz
14:00 DST+03:30	Bayrami 15', 85'; Ansari 90'			Stadium: Gostaresh Foulad Stadium; Attendance: 8,000

17 October 2014 85	Tractor Sazi	4–0	Karun Khuzestan	Tabriz
14:30 DST+03:30	Saghebi 14'; Gordani 36'; Ebrahimi 71' (pen.); Ahmadzadeh 85'			Stadium: Sahand Stadium; Attendance: 12,000

16 October 2014 86	Kian Bakhtiari	0–6	Saipa	Shahrekord
14:00 DST+03:30			Shiri 5' (pen.); Seyed-Salehi 38' (pen.), 67', 85'; Rezaei 79'; Salari 90+1'	Stadium: Enghelab Stadium; Attendance: 5,000

=== Sixth round (round of 16) ===
27 October 2014 87	Esteghlal	4–2	Parseh Tehran	Tehran
16:40 DST+03:30	Karrar 46', 90+3'; Shahbazzadeh 51'; Ghazi 90+1'	Varzesh3	Poursafshekan 9'; Ashouri 90+1'	Stadium: Azadi Stadium; Attendance: 4,000; Referee: Mohsen Torky

26 October 2014 88	Esteghlal Khuzestan	2–3	Zob Ahan	Ahvaz
15:00 DST+03:30	Majidi 75'; Seifollahi 90+4'		Dehnavi 37'; Rajabzadeh 48' (pen.), 90+2'	Stadium: Ghadir Stadium; Attendance: 2,000

26 October 2014 89	Naft Masjed Soleyman	0–0 (a.e.t.) (2–4 p)	Gol Gohar	Masjed Soleyman
16:00 DST+03:30				Stadium: Behnam Mohammadi Stadium; Attendance: 5,000
	Penalties
	Bou Hamdan (penalty scored); Jafari (penalty scored); Maranhão (penalty missed); Soleiman Fallah (penalty missed)		Golzari (penalty scored); Hatami (penalty scored); Rafati (penalty scored); Mozafari (penalty scored)

26 October 2014 90	Persepolis	1–1 (a.e.t.) (4–1 p)	Rah Ahan	Tehran
16:40 DST+03:30	Nouri 49'		Mohammadi 34'	Stadium: Azadi Stadium; Attendance: 5,000
	Penalties
	Umaña (penalty scored); Makani (penalty scored); Kafshgari (penalty scored); Taremi (penalty scored)		Rezaian (penalty scored); Abdi (penalty missed); Alipour (penalty missed)

27 October 2014 91	Naft Tehran	1–0	Shahrdari Ardabil	Tehran
15:00 DST+03:30	Ghorbani 45+1'			Stadium: Takhti Stadium; Attendance: 5,000

26 October 2014 92	Sanat Sari	2–0	Paykan	Sari
14:30 DST+03:30	Farhangdoust 90'; Enayati 90+2'			Stadium: Shohadaye Sari Stadium; Attendance: 12,000

26 October 2014 93	Gostaresh	1–2 (a.e.t.)	Padideh	Tabriz
14:00 DST+03:30	Darvishi 55'		Enayati 65', 114'	Stadium: Gostaresh Foulad Stadium; Attendance: 10,000

26 October 2014 94	Saipa	0–0 (a.e.t.) (1–3 p)	Tractor Sazi	Karaj
14:30 DST+03:30				Stadium: Enghelab Stadium; Attendance: 5,000
	Penalties
	Rezaei (penalty missed); Ramezani (penalty missed); Sadeghi (penalty scored); Hamed Shiri (penalty missed)		Kiani (penalty scored); Iranpourian (penalty missed); Aghaei (penalty scored); Ebrahimi (penalty scored)

=== Quarter-Final (1/4 Final – Last 8) ===
27 November 2014 95	Zob Ahan	2–2 (a.e.t.) (3–0 p)	Esteghlal	Isfahan
17:20 DST+03:30	Dehnavi 23'; Hassanzadeh 75'		Borhani 7'; Jassim 22'	Stadium: Fooladshahr Stadium; Attendance: 9,500
	Penalties
	Rajabzadeh (penalty scored); Santos (penalty scored); Dehnavi (penalty scored)		Beikzadeh (penalty missed); Ebrahimi (penalty missed); Borhani (penalty missed)

27 November 2014 96	Gol Gohar	1–1 (a.e.t.) (2–3 p)	Persepolis	Sirjan
13:30 DST+03:30	Jomezadeh 110' (pen.)		Bengar 115+1'	Stadium: Gol Gohar Stadium; Attendance: 3,200
	Penalties
	Mozaffari (penalty scored); Hatami (penalty missed); Amiri (penalty missed); Jomehzadeh (penalty scored); Bahre Kazemi (penalty scored)		Kafshgari (penalty scored); Makani (penalty missed); Hosseini (penalty scored); Taremi (penalty missed); Nouri (penalty scored)

27 November 2014 97	Naft Tehran	1–1 (a.e.t.) (5–3 p)	Sanat Sari	Tehran
14:30 DST+03:30	Amiri 34'		Padovani 62' (own)	Stadium: Takhti Stadium; Attendance: 1,000
	Penalties
	Padovani (penalty scored); Shiri (penalty scored); Hamdinejad (penalty scored); Ebrahimi (penalty scored); Mobali (penalty scored)		Fooladi (penalty scored); Khodadadi (penalty missed); Abdolhassani (penalty scored); Damadi (penalty missed); Nassehi (penalty scored)

27 November 2014 98	Tractor Sazi	1–2 (a.e.t.)	Padideh	Tabriz
14:00 DST+03:30	Ahmadzadeh 45+2'		Prahić 80' (pen.); Nasimov 92'	Stadium: Sahand Stadium; Attendance: 36,000

=== Semi-final (1/2 final – last 4) ===
5 December 2014 99	Persepolis	1–2	Zob Ahan	Tehran
15:15 DST+03:30	Nouri 61'		Tabrizi 69'; Santos 90+1'	Stadium: Azadi Stadium; Attendance: 40,000

6 December 2014 100	Padideh	1–1 (a.e.t.) (7–8 p)	Naft Tehran	Mashhad
14:00 DST+03:30	Shakeri 71'		Pouraliganji 23'	Stadium: Samen Stadium; Attendance: 30,000
	Penalties
	Enayati (penalty missed); Mohammadrezaei (penalty scored); Abbasian (penalty scored); Shakeri (penalty scored); Sadeghi (penalty scored); Kheiri (penalty scored); Nasimov (penalty scored); Nasehi (penalty scored); Knežević (penalty missed)		Padovani (penalty scored); Ebrahimi (penalty scored); Shiri; Hamdinejad (penalty scored); Mobali (penalty missed); Pouraliganji (penalty scored); Hajmohammadi (penalty scored); Motahari (penalty scored); Amiri (penalty scored)

=== Final ===
1 June 2015 101	Zob Ahan	3–1	Naft Tehran	Tehran
18:30 DST+04:30	Hadadifar 48'; Rajabzadeh 50'; Rezaei 80'		Amiri 46'	Stadium: Takhti Stadium; Attendance: 27,789; Referee: Mohsen Torky

== Top scorers ==
Rank	Player	Club	Goals
1	(Iran) Mehdi Rajabzadeh	Zob Ahan	4
2	(Iraq) Karrar Jassim	Esteghlal	3
2	(Iran) Mehdi Seyed-Salehi	Saipa	3
3	(Iran) Ghasem Dehnavi	Zob Ahan	2
3	(Iran) Reza Enayati	Padideh	2
3	(Iran) Mehrdad Bayrami	Gostaresh	2
3	(Iran) Mokhtar Jomehzadeh	Gol Gohar	2
3	(Iran) Mohammad Nouri	Persepolis	2
3	(Iran) Meysam Majidi	Esteghlal Khuzestan	2
3	(Iran) Farshad Ahmadzadeh	Tractor Sazi	2

== See also ==
- Iran Pro League 2014–15
- Azadegan League 2014–15
- Iran Football's 2nd Division 2014–15
- Iran Football's 3rd Division 2014–15
- Iranian Super Cup
- Futsal Super League 2014–15
