= Jahangir Darvish =

Iranian architect (1933–2024)

- جهانگیر درویش
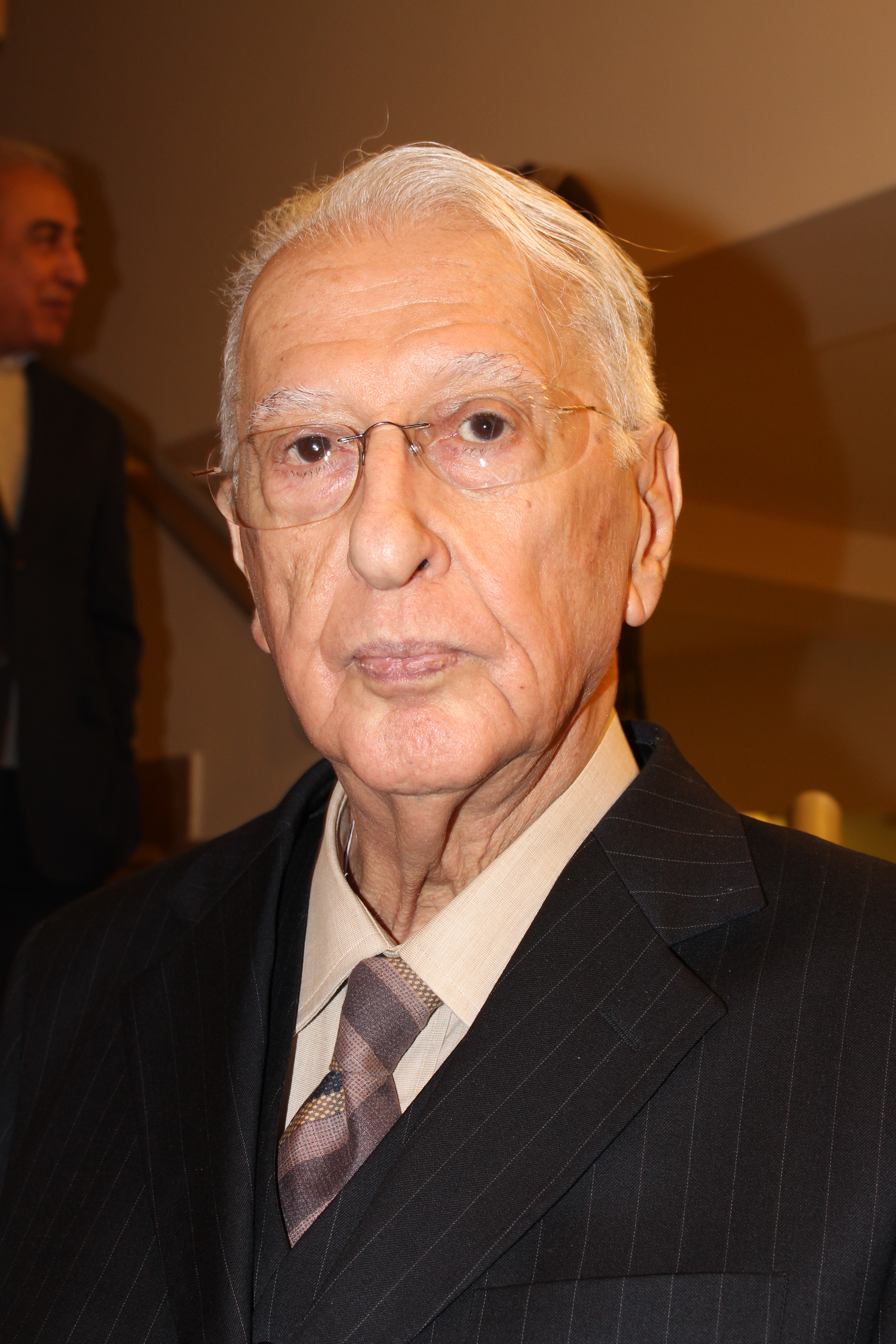
- Darvish in 2017
- Born: 4 September 1933; Varamin
- Died: 26 November 2024
- Citizenship: Iranian
- Known for: Being Architect of Takhti Stadium

Jahangir Darvish (Persian: جهانگیر درویش; 4 September 1933 – 26 November 2024) was an Iranian architect who designed Takhti Stadium.

== Life and career ==
Darvish was born on 4 September 1933. and died on 26 November 2024, at the age of 91. in Varamin. His father Saadalah Khan Darwish was one of the influential fighters of the forest movement. He completed his secondary education with excellent grades at Alborz and Hadaf high schools. He then pursued a two-year preliminary course in architecture from 1955 to 1957 at the Faculty of Fine Arts, University of Tehran. Following this, he traveled to Italy to continue his studies in architecture and obtained his Master's degree from the Faculty of Architecture at the University of Rome. He completed his doctoral studies in 1962 at the Polytechnic University of Turin, Italy. In 1965, he established the Darvish Architecture Institute in Tehran, and in 1983, he founded the "Dr. Darvish Architecture Institute" in Italy. His professional career in architecture began in 1962, with work spanning Italy, Iran, and the United States.

Some of his famous projects include the National Education Institute in Mazandaran, the radio and television centers in Tehran, Bandar Abbas, Shiraz, Urmia, and Tabriz, the Takhti Stadium in Tehran, the Mercedes-Benz building in Turin, residential villas in the United States, the revitalization of the Houston shopping center, and five car dealerships for brands such as Chrysler, Mazda, Toyota, Renault, and Jeep.
