= Alireza Sabouri =

Iranian football forward (born 1993)

Personal information
- Full name: Alireza Sabouri Azad
- Date of birth: 22 March 1993 (age 33)
- Place of birth: Langaroud, Iran
- Positions: Winger; striker

Team information
- Current team: Naft Tehran
- Number: 16

Youth career
- Pegah Gilan
- Sepidrood

Senior career*
Years	Team	Apps	(Gls)
2012–2015	Sepidrood		
2015	Foolad Novin	1	(0)
2015–	Naft Tehran	1	(0)
- * Club domestic league appearances and goals as of 19 August 2015

Alireza Sabouri (Persian: علیرضا صبوری; born 22 March 1993) is an Iranian football forward who currently plays for Sardar Bukan football club Sardar Bukan in League 2.

== Club career ==
=== Sepidrood ===
Sabouri started his career with Sepidrood from Division 2. He was the best scorer of 2012–13 season with 12 times netting.

=== Foolad Novin ===
In Winter 2015 he joined Foolad Novin. He was part of Foolad Novin champion squad in 2014–15 Azadegan League.

=== Naft Tehran ===
Sabouri joined Naft Tehran in summer 2015 after success in technical test. He made his professional debut for Naft Tehran on 19 August 2015 in 2015–16 Iran Pro League against Malavan as a substitute for Aloys Nong.

== Club career statistics ==
As of 19 August 2015.

Club	Division	Season	League		Hazfi Cup		Asia		Total	
Club	Division	Season	Apps	Goals	Apps	Goals	Apps	Goals	Apps	Goals
Foolad Novin	Division 1	2014–15	4	2	1	0	0	0	1	0
Naft Tehran	Pro League	2015–16	3	0	1	2	0	0	2	0
Career Totals			2	0	1	0	0	0	3	0

== Honours ==
=== Club ===
Foolad Novin

- Azadegan League (1): 2014–15

=== Individual ===
Sepidrood

- Iran Football's 2nd Division Top Goalscorer: 2012–13
