= Hamed Fallahzadeh =

Iranian footballer

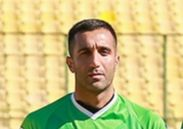

Personal information
- Date of birth: 6 November 1986 (age 39)
- Place of birth: Amol, Iran
- Height: 1.87 m (6 ft 2 in)
- Position: Goalkeeper

Youth career
- 2004–2005: Moghavemat Amol
- 2005–2007: Arash Amol

Senior career*
Years	Team	Apps	(Gls)
2007–2009	Nirooye Zamini		(0)
2009–2013	Naft Tehran	34	(0)
2013–2014	Rah Ahan	24	(0)
2014–2020	Saipa	138	(0)
2020–2021	Sanat Naft Abadan	15	(0)
2021–2022	Kheybar Khorramabad	10	(0)
2022	Omid Vahdat		
- * Club domestic league appearances and goals

Hamed Fallahzadeh (Persian: حامد فلاح زاده; born 6 November 1986) is an Iranian former footballer.

== Club career ==
Fallahzadeh started his career with Nirooye Zamini. He joined Naft Tehran in summer 2009 and extend his contract in July 2012 for another year. He moved to Rah Ahan in summer 2013.

On 1 July 2014, Fallahzadeh left Rah Ahan and signed with Saipa.

=== Club career statistics ===
As of 15 May 2015

Club	Division	Season	League		Hazfi Cup		Asia		Total	
Club	Division	Season	Apps	Goals	Apps	Goals	Apps	Goals	Apps	Goals
Nirooye Zamini	Division 1	2008–09	4	0	0	0	–	–	4	0
Naft Tehran	Division 1	2009–10	14	0	1	0	–	–	15	0
Naft Tehran	Pro League	2010–11	3	0	1	0	–	–	4	0
Naft Tehran	Pro League	2011–12	1	0	0	0	–	–	1	0
Naft Tehran	Pro League	2012–13	16	0	1	0	–	–	17	0
Rah Ahan	Pro League	2013–14	24	0	1	0	–	–	25	0
Saipa	Pro League	2014–15	17	0	0	0	–	–	18	0
Saipa	Pro League	2015–16	17	0	0	0	–	–	17	0
Career Total			75	0	4	0	0	0	79	0
