= Abhar River =

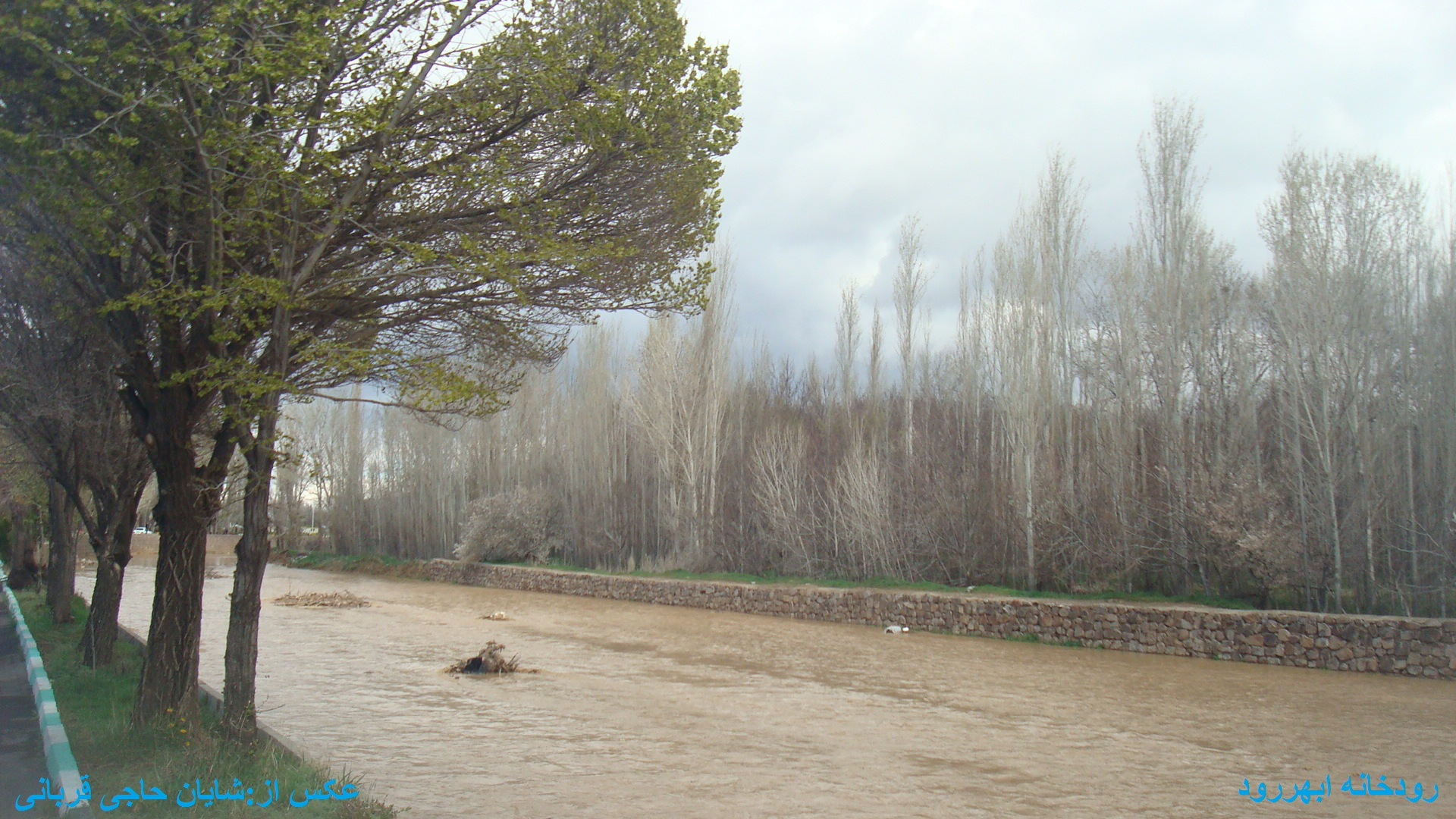
- In this map you can see it was a perennial river about 1943

- Mouth

Location
- Country: Iran

Physical characteristics
- Source
  - location: Abhar
- Mouth
  - location: Qom
  - coordinates: 36.135979°N 49.201224°E

The Abharrood (Azerbaijani: اَبَرچای) (meaning Abhar's river) is a river in Iran that runs between Abhar and Namak Lake near Qom city in the center of Iranian plateaus. It is a Perennial river. The river is over a waterbed used for industrial and drinking water.
