= Abbas Bouazar =

Iranian midfielder

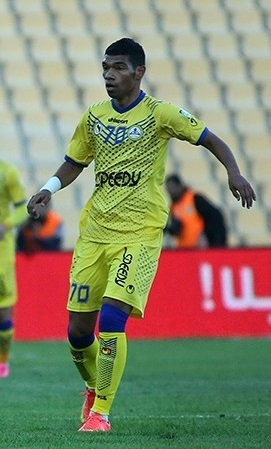

Personal information
- Date of birth: 8 July 1992 (age 34)
- Place of birth: Ahvaz, Iran
- Height: 1.78 m (5 ft 10 in)
- Position: Attacking midfielder

Team information
- Current team: Pars Jonoubi Jam
- Number: 70

Youth career
- 2008-2012: Shahin Ahvaz
- 2012: Esteghlal Ahvaz

Senior career*
Years	Team	Apps	(Gls)
2012–2015	Esteghlal Ahvaz	38	(3)
2015–2017	Naft Tehran	33	(4)
2017–2019	Fajr Sepasi	35	(7)
2019–2020	Foolad	11	(0)
2020–2021	Naft Masjed Soleyman	24	(0)
2021–2023	Sanat Naft	33	(0)
2023–2024	Fajr Sepasi	18	(4)
2024–	Pars Jonoubi Jam	20	(5)
- * Club domestic league appearances and goals as of 21 April 2025

Abbas Bouazar (Persian: عباس بوعذار; born 8 July 1992) is an Iranian professional footballer who plays as a midfielder for Pars Jonoubi Jam in the Azadegan League.

== Club career ==
=== Esteghlal Ahvaz ===
Bouazar started his senior career with Esteghlal Ahvaz in 2012. He scored his first goal on 9 December 2012 in a 2–1 victory against Tarbiat Yazd. He scored three times in 38 appearances before leaving the club.

=== Naft Tehran ===
In December 2014 Bouazar signed with league leaders Naft Tehran. He scored his first goal in his first appearance with the club on 4 February 2015.

== Trend on Social Media ==
In spring of 2021, in the semifinals of Iran's main cup competition, the Hazfi Cup, two competing teams (Saipa FC and Naft Tehran F.C.) had a very physical match, resulting in many red-cards being handed out to players. During the post-match interview, Iranian football legend, Ali Daei, who at the time was the manager of Naft, criticised refereeing decisions, particularly the red card given to Bouazar. The reason for this was that during the interview, a reporter had asked him about his opinion on the red card given to an alleged player called "Mohammadi", who did not exist. The player who was actually red-carded was Bouazar, and Daei was shocked about the referee not even getting the name of the players correct. His response to the interview question was a letter by letter comparison of the words Bouazar and Mohammadi, where he counted the number of letters that exist in Bouazar and not in Mohammadi. The emotional interview quickly became a meme and is frequently shared on social media.
