= Alireza Ezzati =

Iranian footballer

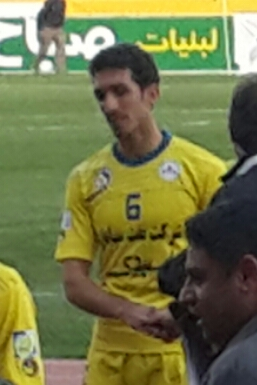

Personal information
- Full name: Alireza Ezzat Keramat
- Date of birth: 31 January 1987 (age 39)
- Place of birth: Shahriar, Iran
- Height: 1.88 m (6 ft 2 in)
- Position: Defensive midfielder

Team information
- Current team: Sepidrood

Youth career
- 2001–2007: Naft Tehran

Senior career*
Years	Team	Apps	(Gls)
2007–2018	Naft Tehran	196	(15)
2007–2009	→ Niroye Zamini (loan)	37	(4)
2018–2019	Sepidrood	9	(0)
- * Club domestic league appearances and goals as of 21 October 2016

Alireza Ezzati (born 31 January 1987 ) is an Iranian footballer.

== Club career ==
Ezzati started his career with Naft Tehran at Youth levels. Alireza Ezzati started playing senior level for Naft Tehran from 2007, he officially made his debut for Naft Tehran in Persian Gulf Pro League facing Steel Azin, the game finished 1-1. He extend his contract with Naft Tehran till 2015 in July 2012.

=== Club career statistics ===
As of 11 December 2018

Club	Division	Season	League		Hazfi Cup		Asia		Total	
Club	Division	Season	Apps	Goals	Apps	Goals	Apps	Goals	Apps	Goals
Naft Tehran	Division 1	2009–10	20	2	0	0	–	–	20	2
Naft Tehran	Pro League	2010–11	25	1	2	0	–	–	27	1
Naft Tehran	Pro League	2011–12	26	1	1	0	–	–	27	1
Naft Tehran	Pro League	2012–13	30	2	2	0	–	–	32	2
Naft Tehran	Pro League	2013–14	28	0	3	0	–	–	31	0
Naft Tehran	Pro League	2014–15	21	3	4	0	0	0	25	3
Naft Tehran	Pro League	2015–16	26	2						
Naft Tehran	Pro League	2016–17								
Naft Tehran	Pro League	2017–18	21	0	0	0	–	–	21	0
Sepidrood	Pro League	2018–19	4	0	1	0	–	–	5	0
Career total							0	0		

== Honours ==
=== Club ===
Naft Tehran

- Persian Gulf Pro League : 2013-14 third place, 2014–15 third place
- Azadegan League (1): 2009-10
- Hazfi Cup (1): 2016–17, 2014–15 runner up
- Iranian Super Cup : 2017 runner up
