= Carlos (footballer, born 1985) =

Brazilian-Croatian footballer

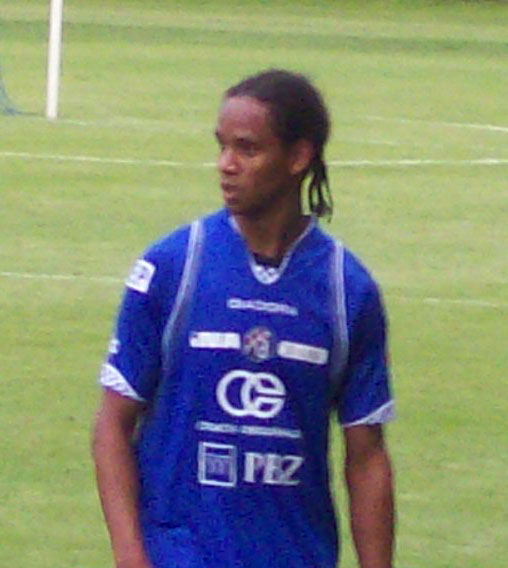
- Carlos in Dinamo Zagreb colours

Personal information
- Full name: Carlos Santos de Jesus
- Date of birth: 25 February 1985 (age 41)
- Place of birth: São Paulo, Brazil
- Height: 1.87 m (6 ft 1 1/2 in)
- Position: Defender

Team information
- Current team: Samut Sakhon City
- Number: 3

Youth career
- São Paulo

Senior career*
Years	Team	Apps	(Gls)
2004–2006	São Paulo	0	(0)
2006–2011	Dinamo Zagreb	55	(3)
2009	→ NK Varteks (loan)	13	(1)
2010	→ Shandong Luneng (loan)	19	(2)
2011	→ NK Zagreb (loan)	5	(1)
2011–2013	Ettifaq	49	(1)
2013–2015	Zob Ahan	43	(3)
2015–2016	Naft Tehran	8	(0)
2016–2017	Ratchaburi Mitr Phol	31	(1)
2018	Al-Shorta	0	(0)
2020–2022	Phrae United	59	(6)
2024–	Samut Sakhon City	8	(1)
- * Club domestic league appearances and goals as of 15:02, 10 March 2021 (UTC)

Carlos Santos de Jesus (born 25 February 1985 in São Paulo, Brazil) is a Brazilian professional footballer. He gained Croatian nationality in October 2007.

== Club career ==
=== São Paulo ===
Carlos came through the youth ranks of São Paulo and signed a senior contract in 2004, but was unable to record a single cap in the senior squad.

=== Dinamo Zagreb ===
On 30 January 2006 Carlos joined Croatian side Dinamo Zagreb. The club paid his transfer €40,000. At first, he was playing on a centre–back position, but in recent seasons he had much more impact as a left full-back. Carlos also spent six months on loan in Varteks during the 2008–09 season, after he found himself out of manager Marijan Vlak's plans. Following his return, he often started in the first–eleven, but found himself on the bench again when the club signed Leandro Cufré. On February 5, 2010, it was announced on the official site of Shandong Luneng that they signed him. In January 2011, he was loaned to NK Zagreb. He played in five games, scoring a goal in the last-round match against Hrvatski Dragovoljac. In July 2011, his contract with Dinamo Zagreb was terminated by mutual consent.

=== Ettifaq ===
He was subsequently signed by the Saudi club Ettifaq FC from Dammam. After two seasons with Ettifaq Carlos left the club.

=== Zob Ahan ===
In 2013 Carlos signed with Iran Pro League side Zob Ahan. In his first year with the club, he made 15 league appearances and helped Zob Ahan avoid relegation. On 1 June 2014, Santos renewed his contract with Zob Ahan, signed a two-year contract until 2016.

== Honours ==
- Dinamo Zagreb
  - Prva HNL: 2005–06, 2006–07, 2007–08, 2008–09
  - Croatian Cup: 2006–07, 2007–8, 2008–09
- Zob Ahan
  - Hazfi Cup: 2014–15

== Career statistics ==
As of 1 June 2015

Club performance			League		Cup		League Cup		Continental		Total	
Season	Club	League	Apps	Goals	Apps	Goals	Apps	Goals	Apps	Goals	Apps	Goals
Croatia			League		Croatian Cup		League Cup		Europe		Total	
2005–06	Dinamo Zagreb	Prva HNL	7	1					0	0	7	1
2006–07	Dinamo Zagreb	Prva HNL	24	1	7	0			5	0	36	1
2007–08	Dinamo Zagreb	Prva HNL	15	1	3	0			7	0	25	1
2008–09	Dinamo Zagreb	Prva HNL	7	0	3	0			3	0	13	0
2008–09	Varteks	Prva HNL	13	1	0	0					13	1
2009–10	Dinamo Zagreb	Prva HNL	2	0	0	0			5	0	7	0
Iran			League		Hazfi Cup		League Cup		Aisa		Total	
2013–14	Zob Ahan	IPL	15	0	1	0	–	–	–	–	16	0
2014–15	Zob Ahan	IPL	28	3	5	1	–	–	–	–	32	4
Career total			111	7	19	1	0	0	20	0	150	8
