= Yousef Muftah =

Qatari footballer (born 1988)

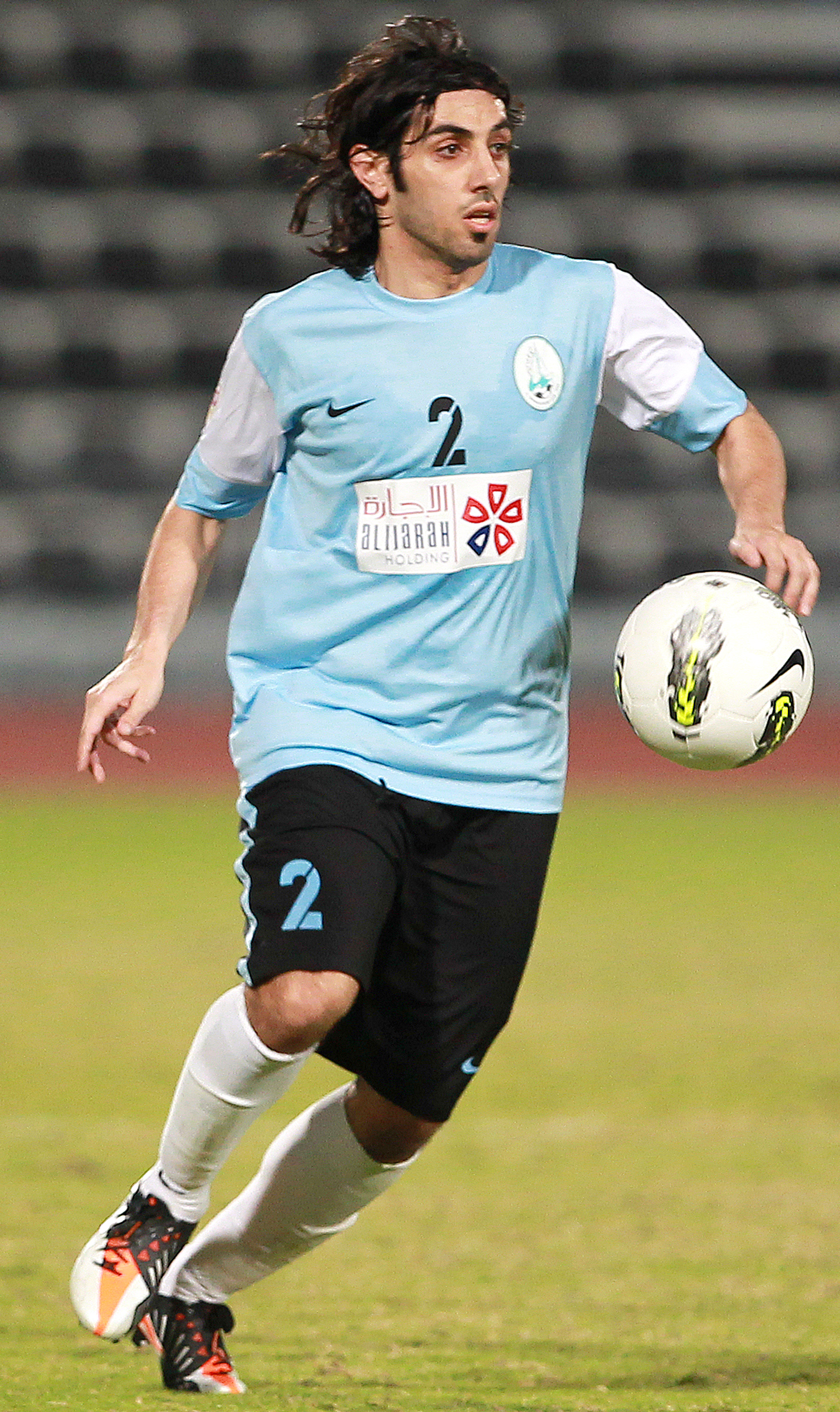

Personal information
- Full name: Yousef Muftah
- Date of birth: 16 May 1988 (age 38)
- Place of birth: Qatar
- Height: 1.65 m (5 ft 5 in)
- Position: Right-back

Team information
- Current team: Al-Arabi
- Number: 2

Youth career
- Al Wakra

Senior career*
Years	Team	Apps	(Gls)
2007–2013	Al Wakra		
2013–2017	El Jaish	65	(0)
2017–2021	Al-Gharafa	79	(0)
2021–	Al-Arabi	61	(0)
- * Club domestic league appearances and goals as of 17 January 2026

Yousef Muftah (Arabic:يوسف مفتاح) (born 16 May 1988) is a Qatari footballer who currently plays for Al-Arabi.
