= 2006–07 Iran 2nd Division =

Iran Football's 2nd Division
- Season: 2006–07
- Promoted: Sepahan Novin; Mes Rafsanjan; Bargh Tehran; Gol Gohar
- Relegated: Chooka Talesh; Shahrdari Kerman; Hepco Arak; Sepidrood

The following were the standings of the 2006–07 Iran 2nd Division football season.

== League standings ==
=== Group 1 ===
Pos	Team	Pld	W	D	L	GF	GA	GD	Pts	Promotion or relegation
1	Sepahan Novin	26	13	10	3	41	18	+23	49	Promoted Azadegan League
2	Mes Rafsanjan	26	13	9	4	47	24	+23	48	Promoted Azadegan League
3	Sanaye Parchin	26	13	8	5	32	23	+9	47	
4	Persepolis Borazjan	26	13	5	8	29	23	+6	44	
5	Naft Tehran	26	10	13	3	32	16	+16	43	
6	Daneshgah Azad Lahijan	26	11	6	9	37	30	+7	39	
7	Ararat Tehran	26	11	5	10	32	37	−5	38	
8	Sanat Gaz Sarakhs	26	8	9	9	25	20	+5	33	
9	Nozhan Sari	26	8	9	9	32	39	−7	33	
10	Zob Ahan Ardabil	26	9	4	13	31	41	−10	31	
11	Tarbiat Lorestan	26	9	2	15	28	35	−7	29	
12	Fajr Sepah Tehran	26	8	4	14	33	34	−1	28	
13	Shahrdari Kerman	26	7	4	15	28	40	−12	25	Relegated to 3rd Division
14	Chooka Talesh	26	1	8	17	21	52	−31	11	Relegated to 3rd Division

=== Group 2 ===
Pos	Team	Pld	W	D	L	GF	GA	GD	Pts	Promotion or relegation
1	Bargh Tehran	26	16	5	5	50	24	+26	53	Promoted Azadegan League
2	Gol Gohar	26	11	11	4	38	24	+14	44	Promoted Azadegan League
3	Damash Tehran	25	11	10	4	45	33	+12	41 (Note: 2 points deducted?)	
4	Mehrkam Pars	26	11	6	9	32	37	−5	39	
5	Iranjavan	26	12	4	10	29	33	−4	40	
6	Nirou Moharekeh	26	9	10	7	35	26	+9	37	
7	Payam Mokhaberat	26	10	9	7	42	36	+6	36 (Note: 3 points deducted?)	
8	Mes Sarcheshmeh	26	7	12	7	31	28	+3	33	
9	Sanati Kaveh	26	7	11	8	27	31	−4	32	
10	Karon Khoramshahr	26	6	11	9	25	33	−8	29	
11	Petroshimi Tabriz	26	6	10	10	27	31	−4	28	
12	Khorshid	26	4	13	9	23	33	−10	25	
13	Sepidrood	26	5	8	13	22	37	−15	23	Relegated to 3rd Division
14	Hepco Arak	26	4	9	13	26	46	−20	20 (Note: 1 point deducted?)	Relegated to 3rd Division
