= Ferreira (footballer, born 1979) =

Brazilian footballer

Personal information
- Full name: Josiesley Ferreira Rosa
- Date of birth: February 21, 1979 (age 47)
- Place of birth: Uberlândia, Brazil
- Height: 1.87 m (6 ft 2 in)
- Position: Striker

Senior career*
Years	Team	Apps	(Gls)
1995–1998	Uberlândia		
1999	Goiás		
2000	Atlético Mineiro		
2000	Ateneu		
2001	Mamoré		
2001–2002	Farense	27	(6)
2002	Vitória Guimarães	6	(0)
2003	Beira-Mar	10	(3)
2003–2004	Gil Vicente	31	(11)
2004	CD Nacional	7	(1)
2005–2006	União Leiria	32	(5)
2006	Cruzeiro	9	(2)
2007	Ipatinga	2	(0)
2007	Náutico	13	(5)
2008	União Leiria	5	(1)
2008	Ulsan Hyundai	7	(0)
2008	Ipatinga	18	(6)
2009	Red Star Belgrade	4	(0)
2009	Náutico	4	(0)
2010	Mirassol	9	(1)
2011–2012	Naft Tehran	31	(11)
2012–2013	Paykan Tehran	16	(2)
- * Club domestic league appearances and goals as of 2011

Josiesley Ferreira Rosa, best known as Ferreira (born February 21, 1979, in Uberlândia, Minas Gerais State) is a Brazilian football striker.

== Career ==
Born in Uberlândia, Minas Gerais State, during his early career he played with several clubs in Brazil: Uberlândia, Goiás, Atlético Mineiro, Ateneu and Mamoré.

In summer 2001 he moved to Portugal where, until 2006, he represented several Portuguese Liga clubs: Farense, Vitória Guimarães, Beira-Mar, Gil Vicente, CD Nacional and União Leiria.

In 2006, he signed with Cruzeiro playing in the Campeonato Brasileiro Série A. He played afterwards with Ipatinga (Serie B) and Náutico (Serie A) before returning to Portuguese top league club União Leiria in 2008.

After that short return to Portugal, his next destination was Ulsan Hyundai Horang-i in the South Korean K-League. Afterwards he had a spell with Ipatinga, who he had helped the year before to get the promotion to the Brazilian Serie A, before joining former European champions Red Star Belgrade playing in the Serbian SuperLiga.

In 2009, he was back to Brazil playing Náutico in the Serie A then moving to Mirassol in 2010. In 2011, he moved abroad again, this time signing with Iran Pro League side Naft Tehran.

== Achievements ==
Rosa was runner-up top scorer of the Campeonato Mineiro 2001, with nine goals and third top scorer of the Portuguese Liga 2003-04, with 14 goals.
