= Farid Mohammadizadeh =

Iranian footballer (born 1994)

Personal information
- Full name: Farid Mohammadizadeh
- Date of birth: 15 October 1994 (age 32)
- Place of birth: Qom, Iran
- Height: 1.80 m (5 ft 11 in)
- Position: Right back

Team information
- Current team: Gol Reyhan
- Number: 4

Youth career
- –2013: Moghavemat Tehran
- 2013–2015: Naft Tehran

Senior career*
Years	Team	Apps	(Gls)
2015–2018	Naft Tehran	44	(0)
2018–	Gol Reyhan	21	(1)
- * Club domestic league appearances and goals as of 14 June 2019

Farid Mohammadizadeh (Persian: فرید محمدی زاده, born 6 September 1994) is an Iranian footballer who plays for Gol Reyhan in the Azadegan League. He primarily plays as a right back.

== Career statistics ==
As of 14 June 2019

Club	Division	Season	League		Cup		Continental		Other		Total	
Club	Division	Season	Apps	Goals	Apps	Goals	Apps	Goals	Apps	Goals	Apps	Goals
Naft Tehran	Iran Pro League	2015–16	0	0	0	0	0	0	—		0	0
Naft Tehran	Iran Pro League	2016–17	17	0	3	0	—		—		20	0
Naft Tehran	Iran Pro League	2017–18	27	0	1	0	—		1	0	29	0
Naft Tehran	Total		44	0	4	0	0	0	1	0	49	0
Gol Reyhan	Azadegan League	2018–19	21	1	0	0	—		—		21	1
Career total			65	1	4	0	0	0	1	0	70	1
