= Iman Mousavi =

Iranian footballer

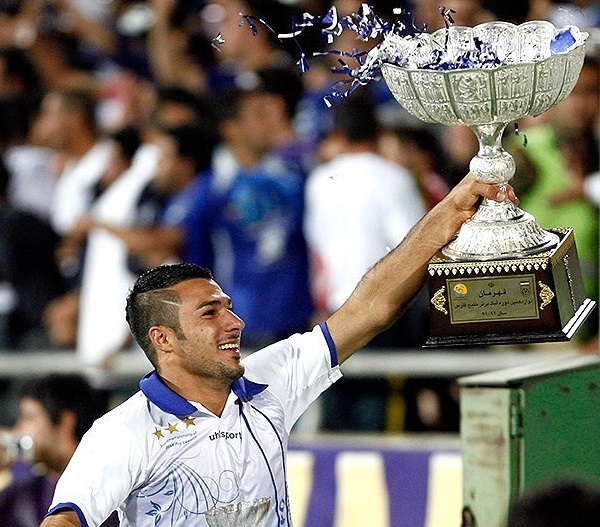
- Mousavi celebrating winning Iran Pro League title with Esteghlal in 2013

Personal information
- Full name: Seyyed Iman Mousavi
- Date of birth: 5 February 1989 (age 37)
- Place of birth: Gachsaran, Iran
- Height: 1.82 m (6 ft 0 in)
- Position: Forward

Youth career
- Naft Tehran

Senior career*
Years	Team	Apps	(Gls)
2007–2011	Moghavemat	41	(1)
2011–2012	Naft Tehran	39	(11)
2012–2013	Esteghlal	12	(1)
2013–2014	Gostaresh	24	(5)
2014–2015	Foolad	10	(0)
2015–2016	Siah Jamegan	11	(1)
2016–2017	Oxin Alborz	17	(0)
2017	Zob Ahan	6	(0)
Total		160	(19)

International career
2008	Iran U-20	3	(2)
2010–2011	Iran U-23	11	(1)
- * Club domestic league appearances and goals as of 13 March 2018

Iman Mousavi (born February 5, 1989) is an Iranian footballer who most recently played for Shams Azar Qazvin in the League 2.

== Club career ==
Mousavi played with Moghavemat Sepasi until 2011. Then, he signed with Naft Tehran. He moved to Esteghlal in December 2012 but was released by the club in the summer of 2013. He was then signed by Gostaresh Foolad.

On 4 July 2014, Mousavi signed a two-year contract with Foolad. He was the club's first sign under new coach Dragan Skočić.

=== Club career statistics ===
As of 15 May 2015

Club performance			League		Cup		Continental		Total	
Season	Club	League	Apps	Goals	Apps	Goals	Apps	Goals	Apps	Goals
Iran			League		Hazfi Cup		Asia		Total	
2007–08	Moghavemat	Pro League	3	0	0	0	-	-	3	0
2008–09	Moghavemat	Pro League	15	0	0	0	-	-	15	0
2009–10	Moghavemat	Pro League	12	1	0	0	-	-	12	1
2010–11	Moghavemat	Division 1	11	1	0	0	-	-	11	1
2011–12	Naft Tehran	Pro League	24	8	0	0	-	-	24	8
2012–13	Naft Tehran	Pro League	15	3	0	0	-	-	15	3
2012–13	Esteghlal	Pro League	12	1	1	1	4	0	16	2
2013–14	Gostaresh Foolad	Pro League	24	5	0	0	-	-	24	5
2014–15	Foolad	Pro League	10	0	1	0	0	0	11	0
2015-16	siah Jamegan	Pro League	11	1	0	0	0	0	11	1
2016-17	Oxin Alborz	Division 1	17	0	0	0	-	-	17	0
2017-18	Zob Ahan	pro League	7	0	0	0	-	-	7	0
Career total			161	20	2	1	4	0	167	21

- Assist goals

Season	Team	Assists
11–12	Naft Tehran	2
12–13	Naft Tehran	2
12–13	Esteghlal	1
13–14	Gostaresh Foolad	1
14–15	Foolad	0

== International ==
Mousavi participated in the 2008 AFC U-19 Championship.

== Honours ==
Esteghlal

- Iran Pro League (1): 2012–13
