= Meysam Joudaki =

Iranian footballer

Personal information
- Date of birth: 3 February 1995 (age 31)
- Place of birth: Tehran, Iran
- Height: 1.82 m (5 ft 11 1/2 in)
- Position: Defender

Team information
- Current team: Naft M.I.S
- Number: 5

Youth career
- 2012–2014: Esteghlal

Senior career*
Years	Team	Apps	(Gls)
2013–2014	Esteghlal	0	(0)
2014–2016	Naft Tehran	0	(0)
2015–2016	→ Rah Ahan (loan)	0	(0)
2016–2017	Khooneh be Khooneh	1	(0)
2017–2018	Gostaresh	4	(0)
2018–2019	Machine Sazi	1	(0)
2019	Shahrdari Tabriz		
2019–2021	Oghab Tehran		
2021–2023	Van Pars		
2023–2024	Mes Soongoun	34	(0)
2024–	Naft M.I.S	27	(1)

International career^{‡}
2014–2015	Iran U19	14	(2)
- * Club domestic league appearances and goals as of 22 April 2025 ‡ National team caps and goals as of 6 January 2018

Meysam Joudaki (Persian: میثم جودکی; born 5 May 1995) is an Iranian football defender who plays for Naft M.I.S in Azadegan League.
