= Vahid Sheikhveisi =

Iranian footballer

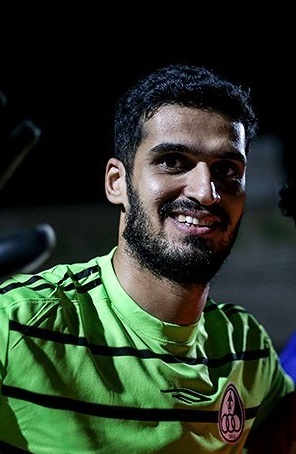

Personal information
- Date of birth: 10 January 1987 (age 39)
- Place of birth: Tehran, Iran
- Height: 1.94 m (6 ft 4 1/2 in)
- Position: Goalkeeper

Team information
- Current team: Ario Eslamshahr
- Number: 44

Youth career
- –2008: Saipa

Senior career*
Years	Team	Apps	(Gls)
2007–2011	Saipa	47	(0)
2011–2014	Fajr Sepasi	53	(0)
2014–2016	Naft Tehran	16	(0)
2016–2018	Esteghlal Khuzestan	52	(0)
2018–2021	Paykan	33	(0)
2021	Arman Gohar Sirjan	7	(0)
2021–2022	Esteghlal Khuzestan	27	(0)
2022–2024	Mes Soongoun	49	(0)
2024–	Ario Eslamshahr	4	(0)
- * Club domestic league appearances and goals as of 21 April 2025

Vahid Sheikhveisi (Persian: وحید شیخ ویسی; born 10 January 1987) is an Iranian footballer who plays for Ario Eslamshahr in the Azadegan League.

== Club career ==
Club performance			League		Cup		Continental		Total	
Season	Club	League	Apps	Goals	Apps	Goals	Apps	Goals	Apps	Goals
Iran			League		Hazfi Cup		Asia		Total	
2007–08	Saipa	Pro League	5	0	0	0	0	0	5	0
2008–09	Saipa	Pro League	18	0	1	0	–	–	19	0
2009–10	Saipa	Pro League	11	0	0	0	–	–	11	0
2010–11	Saipa	Pro League	16	0	0	0	–	–	16	0
2011–12	Fajr Sepasi	Pro League	24	0	0	0	–	–	25	0
2012–13	Fajr Sepasi	Pro League	22	0	0	0	–	–	22	0
2013–14	Fajr Sepasi	Pro League	7	0	0	0	–	–	7	0
2013–14	Naft Tehran	Pro League	0	0	0	0	–	–	0	0
2014–15	Naft Tehran	Pro League	4	0	2	0	0	0	6	0
2015-16	Naft Tehran	Pro League	12	0	3	0	0	0	15	0
2016-17	Esteghlal Khuzestan	Pro League	25	0	0	0	8	0	33	0
2017-18	Esteghlal Khuzestan	Pro League	27	0	3	0	–	–	30	0
Career total			171	0	9	0	8	0	188	0
