= Akbar Saghiri =

Iranian footballer

Personal information
- Full name: Akbar Saghiri
- Date of birth: 27 June 1982 (age 44)
- Place of birth: Tehran, Iran
- Position: Striker

Team information
- Current team: Mes Rafsanjan

Senior career*
Years	Team	Apps	(Gls)
- Niroye Zamini
2008–2009	Petrochimi Tabriz	21	(11)
2009–2010	Persepolis	1	(0)
2009–2010	→ Naft Tehran (loan)		(7)
2010–2012	Naft Tehran	16	(2)
2012–2013	Machine Sazi	12	(2)
2013–2014	Rah Ahan	5	(0)
2014–2015	Nassaji Mazandaran	19	(2)
2015–2016	Aluminium Hormozgan	17	(9)
2016–2018	Sanat Naft Abadan	0	(0)
2018–	Mes Rafsanjan	5	(4)
- * Club domestic league appearances and goals

Akbar Saghiri (Persian: اکبر صغیری; born 27 June 1982) is an Iranian footballer who plays as a striker for Mes Rafsanjan in the Azadegan League.

== Club career ==
He was one of the top scorers in Azadegan League for Petrochimi and moved to Persepolis in June 2009.

=== Club career statistics ===
As of 13 June 2010

Club performance			League		Cup		Continental		Total	
Season	Club	League	Apps	Goals	Apps	Goals	Apps	Goals	Apps	Goals
Iran			League		Hazfi Cup		Asia		Total	
2008–09	Petrochimi	Azadegan League	21	11	4	3	-	-	25	14
2009–10	Persepolis	Persian Gulf Cup	1	0	0	0	-	-	1	0
2009–10	Naft Tehran	Azadegan League		7			-	-		
		Total		15			-	-		
Career total				15			-	-		
