= Hamzeh Mozafari =

Iranian football player (born 1982)

Personal information
- Full name: Hamzeh Mozafari
- Date of birth: December 29, 1982 (age 43)
- Place of birth: Sirjan, Iran
- Height: 1.82 m (6 ft 0 in)
- Position: Defensive midfielder

Team information
- Current team: Gol Gohar

Senior career*
| Years | Team | Apps | (Gls) |
| 2006–2019 | Gol Gohar | 300 | (11) |
- * Club domestic league appearances and goals

Hamzeh Mozafari (born 28 January 1982 in Sirjan) is a former player for the Gol Gohar Sirjan team in the Persian Gulf Pro League and a football coach from Iran. He is currently the coach of the Gol Gohar football team.
