= Reza Aliyari =

Iranian footballer

Reza Aliari
Personal information
- Full name: Reza Aliari Golujeh
- Date of birth: 15 March 1994 (age 32)
- Place of birth: Shahriar, Iran
- Height: 1.83 m (6 ft 0 in)
- Positions: Centre back; left back

Team information
- Current team: Sanat Naft
- Number: 6

Youth career
- Shahrdari Ghods
- –2012: Rah Ahan
- 2012–2014: Moghavemat Tehran
- 2014–2015: Naft Tehran

Senior career*
Years	Team	Apps	(Gls)
2014–2017	Naft Tehran	42	(1)
2017–2019	Saipa	45	(1)
2019	Nassaji	9	(1)
2020	Gol Gohar Sirjan	16	(1)
2020–2022	Saipa	17	(1)
2022	Fajr Sepasi	12	(0)
2022–2023	Kheybar Khorramabad	17	(0)
2024	Darya Caspian Babol	11	(0)
2024–	Sanat Naft	18	(0)

International career^{‡}
- Iran U20
2015–2016	Iran U23	5	(0)
- * Club domestic league appearances and goals as of 21 April 2025 ‡ National team caps and goals as of 22 January 2016

Reza Aliari (Persian: رضا علیاری; born 15 March 1994) is an Iranian football defender who plays for Sanat Naft in the Azadegan League.

== Career ==
=== Early years ===
He started his career with Shahrdari Ghods. He also played at Rah Ahan youth levels. Later he joined Moghavemat Tehran U21 and helped them to become champions in the 2013–14 U-21 Tehran Asia Vision Premier League.

=== Naft Tehran ===
He joined Naft Tehran on May 26, 2014, with a three-year contract. He made his debut against Naft MIS on September 20, 2014, as a substitute for Kamal Kamyabinia and scored 3 minutes after his entrance.

=== Saipa ===
In May 2017, he joined Saipa and played under Ali Daei for the season.

== Club career statistics ==
As of 7 April 2015.

Club	Division	Season	League		Hazfi Cup		Asia		Total	
Club	Division	Season	Apps	Goals	Apps	Goals	Apps	Goals	Apps	Goals
Naft Tehran	Pro League	2014–15	3	1	0	0	1	1	4	2
Naft Tehran	Pro League	2015-16	18	0	0	0	-	-	18	0
Naft Tehran	Pro League	2016-17	24	0	0	0	-	-	24	0
Saipa	Pro League	2017-18	9	0	0	0	-	-	9	0
Career Totals			50	1	0	0	1	1	51	2
