= Siamak Kouroshi =

Iranian footballer

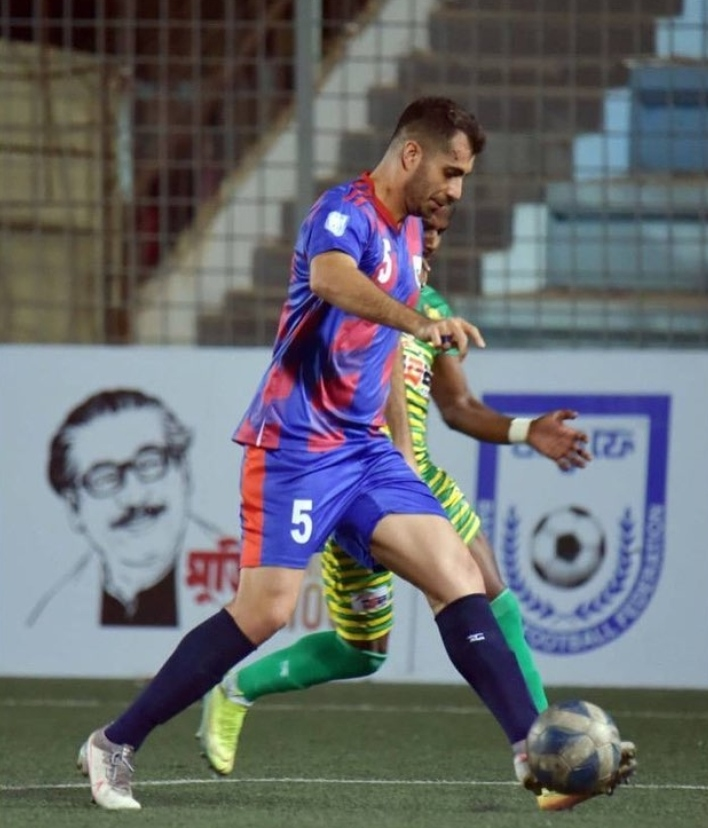
- Kouroshi at Swadhinata KS in 2021

Personal information
- Date of birth: 27 December 1989 (age 36)
- Place of birth: Isfahan, Iran
- Height: 1.91 m (6 ft 3 in)
- Position: Centre-back

Youth career
- –2008: Armin Tehran
- 2008–2009: Sanati Kaveh

Senior career*
Years	Team	Apps	(Gls)
2009–2010	Sanati Kaveh	24	(1)
2010–2016	Naft Tehran	85	(0)
2012–2014	→ Malavan (loan)	38	(4)
2016–2017	Saipa	26	(0)
2017–2018	Muaither	24	(5)
2019	Foolad	11	(0)
2020	Malavan	15	(1)
2021	Bandar Astara		
2021–2022	Swadhinata KS	0	(0)
2022–2023	Setaregan Sorkh		
2023–2024	Salehin		

International career
2009	Iran U23	11	(2)
2012	Iran	1	(0)
- * Club domestic league appearances and goals

Siamak Kouroshi (Persian: سیامک کوروشی; born 27 December 1989) is an Iranian former footballer who played as a defender.

== Club career ==
Kouroshi joined Naft Tehran in 2010, after spending the previous season with Sanati Kaveh in the Azadegan League.

On 22 November 2021, Kouroshi joined Bangladesh Premier League club Swadhinata KS

=== Club career statistics ===
Club	Division	Season	League		Hazfi Cup		Asia		Total	
Club	Division	Season	Apps	Goals	Apps	Goals	Apps	Goals	Apps	Goals
Sanati Kaveh	Azadegan League	2009–10	24	1			—			
Naft Tehran	Persian Gulf Pro League	2010–11	19	0			—			
Naft Tehran	Persian Gulf Pro League	2011–12	19	0			—			
Malavan	Persian Gulf Pro League	2012–13	15	0			—			
Malavan	Persian Gulf Pro League	2013–14	23	4			—			
Naft Tehran	Persian Gulf Pro League	2014–15	22	0	1	0	9	1	32	1
Naft Tehran	Persian Gulf Pro League	2015–16	24	0	3	0	1	0	28	0
Saipa	Persian Gulf Pro League	2016–17	26	0	4	0	—		30	0
Muaither	Qatari Second Division	2017–18	24	5			—			
Foolad	Persian Gulf Pro League	2018–19	11	0	0	0	—		11	0
Career total			207	10			10	1		

== International career ==
He made his debut against Mauritania on 18 April 2012 under Carlos Queiroz.
