= Vahid Hamdinejad =

Iranian footballer

Vahid Hamdi Nejad
Personal information
- Full name: Vahid Hamdi Nejad Ravanaghi
- Date of birth: 23 August 1982 (age 44)
- Place of birth: Sarab, Iran
- Height: 1.75 m (5 ft 9 in)
- Position: Left back

Senior career*
Years	Team	Apps	(Gls)
2007–2009	Aluminium Arak	26	(1)
2009–2010	Aluminium Hormozgan	25	(4)
2010–2012	Saba Qom	59	(3)
2012–2017	Naft Tehran	123	(2)
2017–2018	Pars Jonoubi	5	(1)
2018–2019	Esteghlal Khuzestan	23	(0)
- * Club domestic league appearances and goals

Vahid Hamidi Nejad (Persian: وحید حمدی نژاد روانقی; born 23 August 1982) is an Iranian former footballer.

== Club career ==
Hamidi Nejad joined Saba Qom in 2010 after spending the previous season at Aluminium Hormozgan

Club performance			League		Cup		Continental		Total	
Season	Club	League	Apps	Goals	Apps	Goals	Apps	Goals	Apps	Goals
Iran			League		Hazfi Cup		Asia		Total	
2008–09	Aluminium A.	Division 1	26	1	0	0	-	-	26	1
2009–10	Aluminium H.	Division 1	25	4	0	0	-	-	25	4
2010–11	Saba Qom	Pro League	27	3	1	0	-	-	28	3
2011–12	Saba Qom	Pro League	32	0	3	0	-	-	35	0
2012–13	Naft Tehran	Pro League	31	0	0	0	-	-	31	0
2013–14	Naft Tehran	Pro League	29	0	0	0	-	-	29	0
2014–15	Naft Tehran	Pro League	29	0	3	0	0	0	19	0
2015–16	Naft Tehran	Pro League	22	2	0	0	-	-	22	2
2016–17	Naft Tehran	Pro League	12	0	0	0	-	-	12	0
Career total			233	10	7	0	0	0	240	10

- Assist Goals

Season	Team	Assists
10–11	Saba	3
11–12	Saba	3
