= Takhti Stadium (Tehran) =

Multi-purpose stadium in Eastern Tehran, Iran

Coordinates: 35°40′12″N 51°30′43″E

Takhti Stadium, Tehran
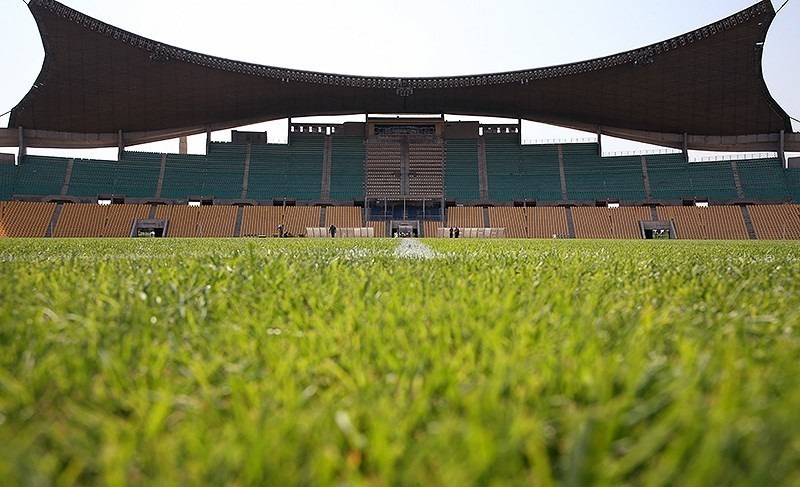
- Interactive map of Takhti Stadium, Tehran
- Full name: Takhti Tehran Stadium
- Former names: Queen Farah Pahlavi Stadium (1973–1980)
- Location: Tehran, Iran
- Owner: Ministry of Sport and Youth (Iran)
- Operator: Tehran Municipality; Takhti Sport Complex
- Capacity: 30,122
- Surface: Desso GrassMaster
- Field size: 110 m × 75 m (361 ft × 246 ft)

Construction
- Built: 1968–1973 (5 years)
- Opened: 3 June 1973
- Renovated: 2006 to 2007 2022 to 2023
- Expanded: 2005
- Architect: Jahangir Darvish

Tenant
- Saipa F.C.

Website
- www.takhtisportcomplex.ir

Takhti Tehran (Persian: ورزشگاه تختی) formerly known as Queen Farah Pahlavi Stadium (Persian: ورزشگاه شهبانو فرح پهلوی) is a multi-purpose stadium, located in Eastern of Tehran, Tehran province, Iran. It is used mostly for football matches. The stadium is able to hold 30,122 people and was opened in 1973. Takhti (Farah Pahlavi) Stadium is home venue of Saipa F.C. Takhti (Farah Pahlavi) Stadium is the first covered stadium in Iran. It was named after the last queen of Iran, Farah Pahlavi but after 1979 Iranian Revolution it is named after Gholamreza Takhti.

== History ==
Takhti Stadium was built to use for 1974 Asian Games and is part of Takhti Sport Complex. The stadium's building progress was started in June 1968. It was opened on 3 June 1973 and was named Farah Stadium in honor of Farah Pahlavi, Iran's ex-empress.

== Building ==
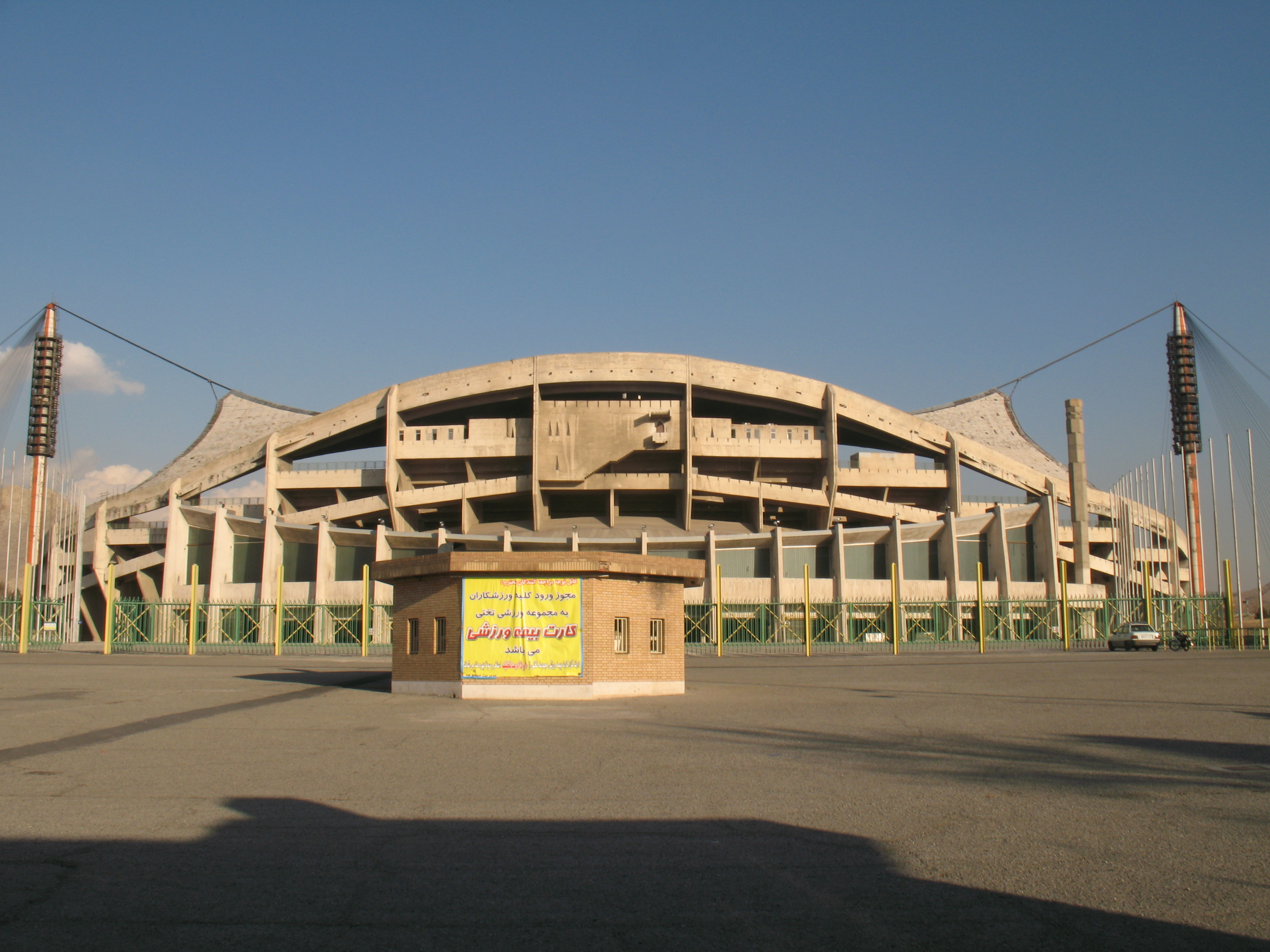
External view of the stadium

The stadium is on the crest of Farah and stadium is a logo of Farah's crown. Grandstands also is based from crown's logo. It is also similar to Munich Olympic Stadium. . Underlying cause maximum holding time from 2 pm onwards that all viewers Tournament match up against the sun as much as possible and be on equal terms. On the other hand, this solution will enable to display Nmabshat national and field competitions in the East as a night scene can be enormous. The main objective was to design a cover for the viewers as almost more than 2/3 (two thirds) of the shadow of the cable shield to the project. The geometric skeleton of a horse saddle is covered. 2 - Coverage of the rigid concrete stadium and attached to the side of the other side as a domestic non-rigid composite cable is inhibited. In this series, sports such as athletics, cycling and tennis is played. With a capacity of 35,000 football pitches for official matches, 12 earth, and six pitches for local matches, artificial grass and pool and sauna is considered.

== Events ==
The stadium was used during 1974 Asian Games as the second venue. It was also hosted Iran national football team matches in group and semi-finals matches of 2008 West Asian Football Federation Championship. 2010 Islamic Solidarity Games was planned to be held at this stadium but the tournament was cancelled.

The final match of Hazfi Cup in 2014–15 season took place in this stadium on 1 June 2015.

=== 2008 WAFF matches ===
Date	Time (QST)	Team #1	Res.	Team #2	Round
2008–08–07	20:30	Iran	3–0	Palestine	Group A
2008–08–07	17:00	Syria	0–0	Jordan	Group B
2008–08–09	20:00	Palestine	0–1	Qatar	Group A
2008–08–09	17:00	Oman	1–2	Syria	Group B
2008–08–11	20:30	Iran	6–1	Qatar	Group A
2008–08–11	17:00	Jordan	3–1	Oman	Group B
2008–08–13	20:30	Iran	2–0	Syria	Semi-final
2008–08–13	17:00	Jordan	3–0	Qatar	Semi-final
