= Naft Tehran F.C. =

Iranian football club

Naft Tehran نفت تهران
- Full name: Naft Tehran Football Club باشگاه فوتبال نفت تهران
- Nicknames: Black Cats; Yellow Ghosts
- Founded: 23 August 1950
- Ground: Takhti Stadium; Tehran
- Capacity: 30,122
- Owner: Tehran Kar Rasa Company
- League: League 3
- 2019–20: League 3, 3rd (Group A)
- Website: https://naftclub.com
Home colours	Away colours

Naft Tehran Football Club (Persian: باشگاه فوتبال نفت تهران, Bashgah-e Futbal-e Nuft Teheran) was an Iranian football club based in Tehran, Iran. They competed in the Persian Gulf Pro League. They were owned by the National Iranian Oil Company previously. Naft Tehran was founded in 1950 and played in the Takhti Stadium until 2018.

Naft has finished third place in the Persian Gulf Pro League three times and has also won the Hazfi Cup. In 2015, for the first time in the club's history, Naft played in the AFC Champions League. They defeated Al-Ahli of Saudi Arabia in the round of 16 to advance to the quarter–finals where they were eliminated by Al-Ahli Dubai.

Following the departures of their best players, Naft Tehran were relegated to the second tier in 2017.

While the club was dealing with ownership and financial problems, forfeiting two matches in the second tier resulted in their relegation to the 3rd tier of Iranian Football. On October 22, 2018, the minister of sports announced the club's dissolution. Subsequently, players and the staff were released. Since then, Naft Tehran is participating as Naft Iranian Tehran in League 3.

== History ==
=== Establishment ===
On 23 August 1971, National Iranian Oil Company decided on starting a football team. Before the Iranian Revolution the team competed in the Tehran Football League for several years. In 2003, the club was competing in the Tehran Local Leagues. In 2005, they were promoted to the 3rd Division.

Naft Tehran was competing in Iran's 2nd Division and they turned out to be one of the best teams. In the first round, they had managed to score 36 goals and convecting only 14, they were on top of Iranjavan with 38 points. In the second round, they came out second at the Group B. They were just under Mes Sarcheshmeh with 3 points away and 1 point on top of Esteghlal Jonub Tehran, Naft Tehran after promoted to Azadegan League.

=== Promotion to Iran Pro League ===
After three years of competing in the 2nd Division, Naft was promoted to the Azadegan League. Naft Tehran started the season well in Azadegan League and eventually became first in the group tables. Naft Tehran came out with a huge goal difference by conceding the fewest goals, and they were on top of the table by 1 point from Damash Gilan They didn't score much as their top scorer Akbar Saghiri scored 7 goals in the league. It was the first time ever that Naft Tehran went to Iran Pro League.

==== Iran Pro League ====
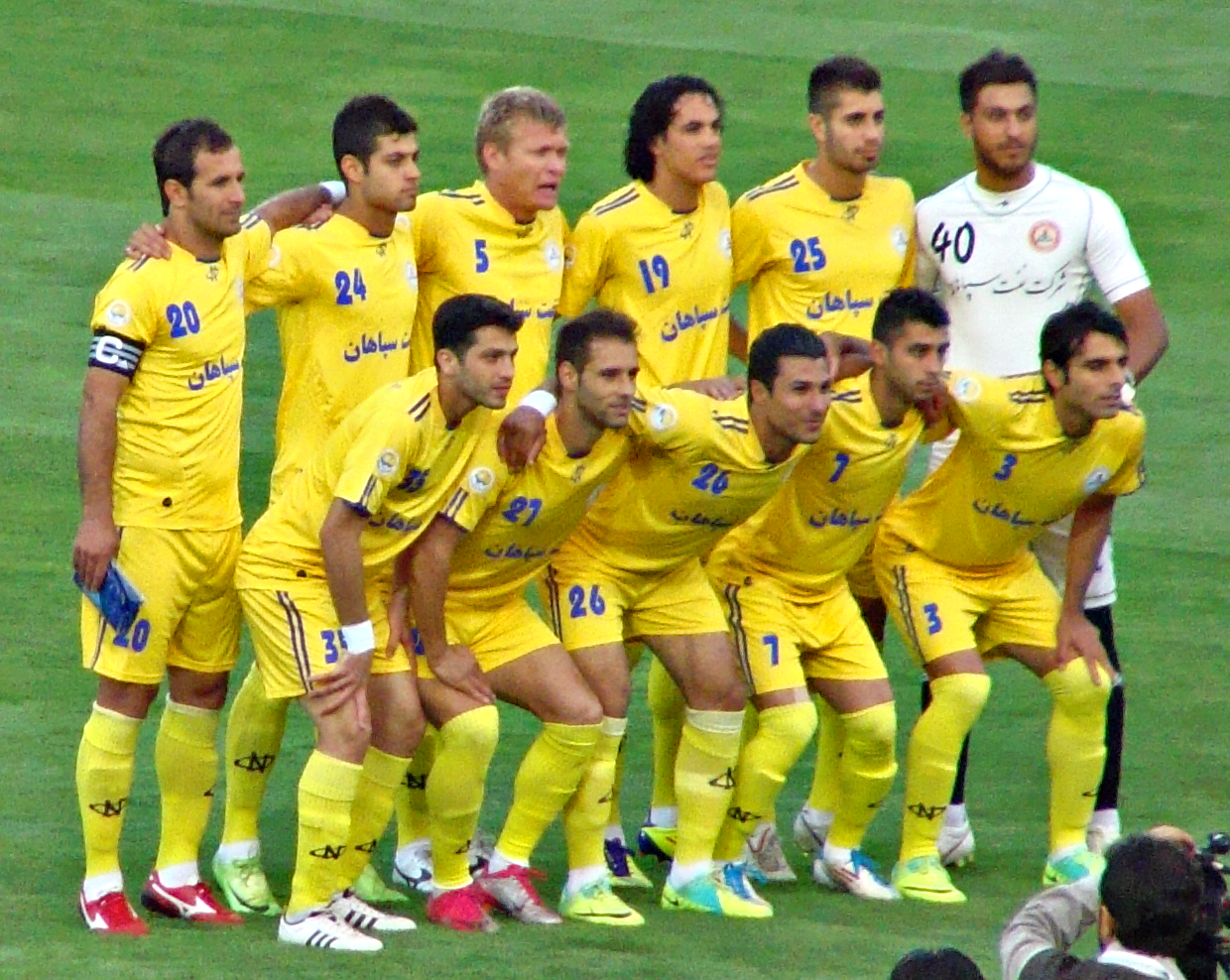
Naft Tehran players in 2011–12 season

Naft Tehran was competing in Iran's 2nd Division and they turned out to be one of the best teams. In the first round they had managed to score 36 goals and conceding only 14, they were on top of Iranjavan with 38 points. In the second round they came out second at the Group B. They were just under Mes Sarcheshmeh with 3 points away and 1 point on top of Esteghlal Jonub Tehran, Naft Tehran after promoted to Azadegan League.

Naft Tehran started the season well in Azadegan League and eventually became first in the group tables. Naft Tehran came out with a huge goal difference by conceding the fewest goals, and they were on top of the table by one point from Damash Gilan. They didn't score much as their top scorer Akbar Saghiri scored seven goals in the league. It was the first time ever that Naft Tehran went to Persian Gulf Pro League.

==== Champions League ====
On the final day of the 2013–14 Iran Pro League season, Naft lead the league and had an opportunity to win the league. However, Naft lost to Sepahan and dropped to 3rd place, which was still good enough for a spot in the AFC Champions League, the first time in club history the team has reached the international stage. In May 2014 Yahya Golmohammadi announced that he would not be extending his contract with Naft and had signed with Zob Ahan. Shortly after on 31 May, Naft revealed Ali Reza Mansourian as their manager for the 2014–15 season. The club qualified for the 2015 AFC Champions League group stage after a 1–0 win over Qatari club El Jaish in the play-off round. Naft won its first ever Champions League game in a 2–1 victory against Saudi club Al Shabab. On 6 May 2015 the club advanced to the round of 16 of the AFC Champions League.

On 15 May 2015, on the final matchday of the league, Naft went in to the final match second and tied on points with Tractor, whom they played in the final match. Naft drew with Tractor 3–3 and finished third in the league, securing a Champions League play-off spot. In the Hazfi Cup final, Naft Tehran was defeated by Zob Ahan.

==== Hazfi Cup champions ====
During the 2015–16 season, Naft encountered severe financial issues and could not pay the players and coaching staff. The National Iranian Oil Company decided to sell the club and it was believed that relegated Malavan would buy the clubs rights and remain in the Persian Gulf Pro League. However, Behnam Pishro Company bought Naft and the team remained in Tehran.

After Alireza Mansourian left the club to become head coach of Esteghlal, the club hired Iranian legend Ali Daei to lead the club. After Daei took over the team in 2016, financial issues in the club continued. Despite this Naft was fighting for an AFC Champions League spot for most of the season. Naft also had success in the Hazfi Cup, Daei's team defeated Sepahan 1–0 to advance to the final against Tractor. In the final Sajjad Shahbazzadeh scored a late winner for Naft as the club won its first major domestic title.

==== Relegation to 3rd Division and dissolution ====
After Disturbance in the Club Regarding Ownership Issue, it was declared that Naft Tehran Relegated to 3rd Division and 2018–19 Azadegan League will resume with remaining 17 teams.

== Supporters ==
Before Naft's successful season in the AFC Champions League, the club had only a few supporters who were mostly workers of the National Iranian Oil Company. In 2015 after a third-place finish in the league, reaching the final of the Hazfi Cup and advancing to the quarter-finals of the Champions League the club gained some supporters and became the third most popular team in Tehran behind Persepolis and Esteghlal.

== Season-by-season ==
The table below comes from List of Naft Tehran F.C. seasons

The table below chronicles the achievements of Naft Tehran in various competitions since 2003.

Season	League	Position	Hazfi Cup	AFC	Notes
2003–04	Tehran Football League	4th
2004–05	Tehran Football League	1st			Promoted
2005–06	3rd Division	1st			Promoted
2006–07	2nd Division	5th
2007–08	2nd Division	7th	First round
2008–09	2nd Division	1st	1/16 Final		Promoted
2009–10	Azadegan League	1st	Third round		Promoted
2010–11	Pro League	13th	Round of 32
2011–12	Pro League	5th	Round of 32
2012–13	Pro League	5th	Round of 16
2013–14	Pro League	3rd	Round of 16
2014–15	Pro League	3rd	Runner-up
2015–16	Pro League	5th	Quarter-final	Quarter-final
2016–17	Pro League	9th	Champions	Play-off
2017–18	Pro League	15th	Round of 32		Relegated
2018–19	Azadegan League	Disqualified			Relegated

== Individual records ==
Lists of the players with the most caps and top goalscorers for the club, as of 13 March 2016 (players in bold signifies current Naft Tehran player). (The stats are from 2009)

=== Top scorers ===
Player	Goals	Years
(Iran) Yaghoub Karimi	18	2011–13
(Iran) Ali Ghorbani	15	2013–16
(Iran) Amir Arsalan Motahari	14	2014–17
(Iran) Reza Norouzi	13	2012–14
(Iran) Mohammad Ghazi	12	2016–17
(Iran) Vahid Amiri	11	2013–16
(Brazil) Ferreira	11	2010–12
(Iran) Iman Mousavi	11	2011–12

=== Top scorers by season ===
Season	Player	Goals
2009–10	(Iran) Akbar Saghiri	7
2010–11	(Brazil) Ferreira	10
2011–12	(Iran) Iman Mousavi	8
2012–13	(Iran) Yaghoub Karimi	10
2013–14	(Iran) Reza Norouzi	11
2014–15	(Iran) Amir Arsalan Motahari	9
2015–16	(Iran) Vahid Amiri	5
2016–17	(Iran) Mohammad Ghazi	12

=== Clean sheets by season ===
Season	Player	Clean Sheet
2009–10	(Iran) Hamed Fallahzadeh	11
2010–11	(Iran) Hossein Ashena	9
2011–12	(Iran) Hamed Fallahzadeh	13
2012–13	(Iran) Sosha Makani	12
2013–14	(Iran) Alireza Beiranvand	12
2014–15	(Iran) Alireza Beiranvand	9
2015–16	(Iran) Alireza Beiranvand	9
2016–17	(Iran) Milad Farahani	5

== Performance in AFC competitions ==
=== AFC Champions League record ===
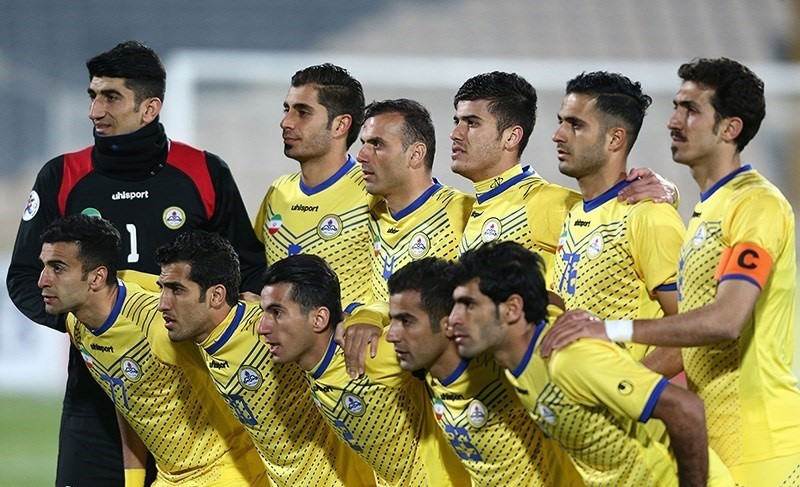
Naft Tehran team image before match against El Jaish in AFC Champions League, 9 February 2016

Asian Club Championship / AFC Champions League
Season	Round	Rival	Home	Away	Agg.
2015	Play-off	(Qatar) El Jaish	1–0	–	–
2015	Group Stage (Group B)	(Uzbekistan) Pakhtakor	1–1	2–1	–
2015	Group Stage (Group B)	(United Arab Emirates) Al-Ain	1–1	3–0	–
2015	Group Stage (Group B)	(Saudi Arabia) Al-Shabab	2–1	0–3	–
2015	Knockout	(Saudi Arabia) Al-Ahli	1–0	2–1	2–2
2015	Knockout	(United Arab Emirates) Al-Ahli	0–1	2–1	3–1
2016	Play-off	(Qatar) El Jaish	0–2	–	–

=== Top goalscorers in AFC Champions League ===
Rank	Player	Goals	Seasons
1	(Iran) Amir Arsalan Motahari	3	2
2	(Iran) Vahid Amiri	2	2
2	(Iran) Gholamreza Rezaei	2	1
2	(Brazil) Leandro Padovani	2	1
3	(Iran) Ali Ghorbani	1	2
3	(Iran) Siamak Kouroshi	1	2
3	(Iran) Reza Aliari	1	2

== Honours ==
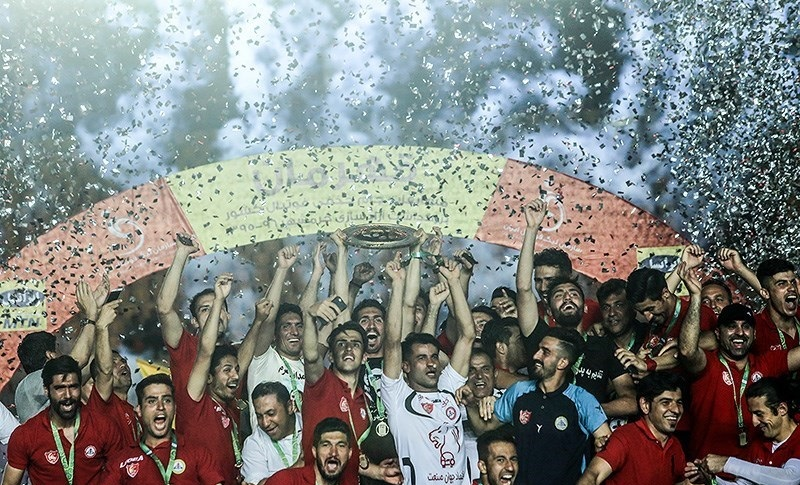
Naft players celebrating winning 2016–17 Hazfi Cup title

=== Domestic ===
- Persian Gulf Pro League
  - Third place (2): 2013–14, 2014–15
- Hazfi Cup
  - Winners (1): 2016–17
  - Runners-up (1): 2014–15
- Iranian Super Cup
  - Runners-up (1): 2017
- Azadegan League
  - Champions (1): 2009–10
- 2nd Division
  - Champions (1): 2008–09
- 3rd Division
  - Champions (1): 2005–06
- Tehran Province League
  - Champions (1): 2004–05
