= 2013–14 Esteghlal Khuzestan F.C. season =

Esteghlal Khuzestan
2013–14 season
- Manager: Abdollah Veisi
- Stadium: Takhti Stadium
- Persian Gulf Cup: 12th
- Hazfi Cup: Round of 32 vs Alvand Hamedan
- Top goalscorer: League: Milad Meydavoudi (5); All: Milad Meydavoudi (5)
- Highest home attendance: 10,000 vs Esteghlal (23 August 2013)
- Lowest home attendance: 2,000 vs Zob Ahan (24 July 2013)
- Average home league attendance: 4,500

The 2013–14 season are the Esteghlal Khuzestan Football Club's first season in the Iran Pro League and the top division of Iranian football. They are also competing in the Hazfi Cup.

== Squad ==
Note: Flags indicate national team as defined under FIFA eligibility rules; some limited exceptions apply. Players may hold more than one non-FIFA nationality.

No.	Pos.	Nation	Player
1	GK	BRA	Fábio Carvalho
2	DF	IRI	Mohammad Tayyebi
4	DF	IRI	Sohrab Bakhtiarizadeh (Captain)
7	FW	IRI	Mehdi Chahkoutahzadeh
8	MF	MLI	Idrissa Traoré ^{U23}
9	MF	IRI	Mahmoud Tighnavard
10	FW	IRI	Milad Meydavoudi
11	FW	IRI	Mohammad Mo'avi ^{U23}
12	DF	MLI	Moussa Coulibaly
13	DF	IRI	Hossein Kaebi (3rd Captain)
14	MF	IRI	Mehdi Kheiri
15	MF	IRI	Karim Shaverdi
16	FW	IRI	Ebrahim Salehi ^{U23}
17	DF	IRI	Ramtin Soleimanzadeh
18	MF	IRI	Hossein Mo'avi ^{U21}

No.	Pos.	Nation	Player
19	FW	IRI	Ali Bigdeli
20	FW	IRI	Hadi Khanifar
21	FW	IRI	Shahrokh Shams ^{U23}
22	GK	IRI	Parviz Karimi
23	MF	IRI	Iman Mobali (2nd Captain)
24	MF	IRI	Ala Khallafzadeh ^{U23}
25	DF	IRI	Farzad Jafari
26	DF	IRI	Mohammad Mad Malisi
27	FW	IRI	Ehsan Alvanzadeh
29	MF	IRI	Ramin Khosravi
30	FW	IRI	Mohammad Ousani
33	GK	IRI	Ali Akbar Ahaki ^{U21}
35	FW	IRI	Sajjad Ghasemnejad ^{U21}
40	MF	IRI	Adel Kolahkaj
66	DF	IRI	Saeid Chahjouei

== Transfers ==
=== Summer ===
In: Note: Flags indicate national team as defined under FIFA eligibility rules; some limited exceptions apply. Players may hold more than one non-FIFA nationality.

No.	Pos.	Nation	Player
4	DF	IRI	Sohrab Bakhtiarizadeh ^{PL} (from Saba Qom)
1	GK	IRI	Fábio Carvalho ^{PL} (from Paykan)
13	DF	IRI	Hossein Kaabi ^{PL} (from Sanat Naft)
14	MF	IRI	Mehdi Kheiri ^{PL} (from Naft Tehran)
7	FW	IRI	Mehdi Chahkoutahzadeh (from Iranjavan)
16	MF	IRI	Ebrahim Salehi (from Iranjavan)
15	MF	IRI	Karim Shaverdi (from Pas Hamedan)
23	MF	IRI	Iman Mobali ^{PL} (from Paykan)
33	GK	IRI	Ali Akbar Ahaki (from Foolad U21)
40	MF	IRI	Adel Kolahkaj ^{PL} (from Persepolis)
10	FW	IRI	Milad Meydavoodi ^{PL} (from Aluminium Hormozgan)
8	MF	MLI	Idrissa Traoré (from (Mali) Djoliba)
12	DF	MLI	Moussa Coulibaly (from (Mali) Djoliba)
19	FW	IRI	Ali Bigdeli (from Esteghlal Ramhormoz)

Out: Note: Flags indicate national team as defined under FIFA eligibility rules; some limited exceptions apply. Players may hold more than one non-FIFA nationality.

No.	Pos.	Nation	Player
16	DF	IRI	Alireza Ebrahimi (to Mes Kerman)
1	GK	IRI	Khaled Shahitavi (Released)
4	DF	IRI	Kousha Bakhtiarizadeh (Released)
5	DF	IRI	Mojtaba Zare Mehrjerdi (Released)
8	MF	IRI	Rouhollah Nemati (Released)
10	FW	IRI	Hamid Khodabandelou (to Damash)
12	GK	IRI	Mohammad Nobegan (Released)
15	MF	IRI	Hassan Yousefi (Released)
19	FW	IRI	Mohammad Abiat (Released)
21	MF	IRI	Aboutaleb Ghanbarizadeh (Released)
22	GK	IRI	Mostafa Mirzaei (Released)
23	DF	IRI	Mohammad Amin Farajifard (Released)
24	MF	IRI	Shahab Ghanbari (Released)
27	MF	IRI	Mojtaba Babaei (Released)
32	DF	IRI	Saeid Anafcheh (Released)
33	GK	IRI	Amin Jahanmehr (Released)
—	MF	IRI	Pouria Darakeh (Released)
—	MF	IRI	Mohammad Sarfaraz (Released)
—	DF	IRI	Nabi Saki (Released)

=== Winter ===
In: Note: Flags indicate national team as defined under FIFA eligibility rules; some limited exceptions apply. Players may hold more than one non-FIFA nationality.

No.	Pos.	Nation	Player
25	DF	IRI	Farzad Jafari (from Esteghlal Ahvaz)
9	MF	IRI	Mahmoud Tighnavard (from Mes Kerman)
66	DF	IRI	Saeid Chahjouei (from Shahrdari Bandar Abbas)
29	DF	IRI	Mohammad Ebrahim Khosravi (from Alvand Hamedan)
30	FW	IRI	Mohammad Ousani (from Shahrdari Dezful)

Out: Note: Flags indicate national team as defined under FIFA eligibility rules; some limited exceptions apply. Players may hold more than one non-FIFA nationality.

No.	Pos.	Nation	Player
3	DF	IRI	Mehdi Nazari (to Badr Hormozgan)
5	DF	IRI	Hamed Mahmoudi (to Shahrdari Tabriz)
6	MF	IRI	Mansour Noami (to Badr Hormozgan)
17	DF	IRI	Ramtin Soleymanzadeh (On loan at Fajr Sepasi)
23	MF	IRI	Iman Mobali (on loan at Esteghlal)

== Competitions ==
=== Iran Pro League ===
==== Standings ====
Pos	Team	Pld	W	D	L	GF	GA	GD	Pts	Qualification or relegation
10	Gostaresh	30	7	11	12	31	34	−3	32	
11	Rah Ahan	30	7	10	13	25	34	−9	31	
12	Est. Khuzestan	30	6	11	13	26	37	−11	29	
13	Zob Ahan	30	6	11	13	24	36	−12	29	
14	Fajr Sepasi (R)	30	6	11	13	20	34	−14	29	Qualification to relegation play-offs

Updated to match(es) played on 11 April 2014. Source: FIFA.com
Rules for classification: 1) points; 2) goal difference; 3) number of goals scored.
(R) Relegated

==== Results summary ====
Overall								Home						Away					
Pld	W	D	L	GF	GA	GD	Pts	W	D	L	GF	GA	GD	W	D	L	GF	GA	GD
30	6	11	13	26	37	−11	29	5	4	6	16	20	−4	1	7	7	10	17	−7

Last updated: 11 April 2014.
Source: Match reports

==== Results by round ====
Round	1	2	3	4	5	6	7	8	9	10	11	12	13	14	15	16	17	18	19	20	21	22	23	24	25	26	27	28	29	30
Ground	H	A	H	A	H	A	H	A	H	A	H	A	H	H	A	A	H	A	H	A	H	A	H	A	H	A	H	A	A	H
Result	W	D	D	L	L	L	W	D	L	L	W	D	W	L	D	W	D	D	L	D	L	L	W	L	D	D	D	L	L	L
Position	2	4	7	10	10	13	11	10	12	12	11	11	9	10	11	10	10	10	10	9	10	10	10	11	11	11	11	12	12	12

Updated to match(es) played on 11 April 2014. Source: Match reports
A = Away; H = Home; W = Win; D = Draw; L = Loss

==== Matches ====
24 July 2013 1	Esteghlal Khuzestan	2 – 0	Zob Ahan Esfahan	Ahvaz
22:00 UTC+4:30	Kolahkaj 84'; Meydavoodi 89' (yellow card); M.Nazari (yellow card)	Summary	Aliabadi (yellow card); Haddadifar (yellow card)	Stadium: Takhti Stadium; Attendance: 2,000; Referee: Shahin Hajbabaei

1 August 2013 2	Mes Kerman	1 – 1	Esteghlal Khuzestan	Kerman
22:00 UTC+4:30	Hassanzadeh 90+2'; Tighnavard (yellow card)	Summary	Chahkoutahzadeh 4'; Traoré (yellow card) (yellow-red card) 45'	Stadium: Shahid Bahonar Stadium; Attendance: 2,000; Referee: Ghasem Vahedi

6 August 2013 3	Esteghlal Khuzestan	0 – 0	Saipa	Ahvaz
22:00 UTC+4:30	M.Tayebi (yellow card); Kolahkaj (yellow card)	Summary	Shiri (yellow card)	Stadium: Takhti Stadium; Attendance: 4,000; Referee: Jamshid Daneshmehr

11 August 2013 4	Malavan	2 – 1	Esteghlal Khuzestan	Bandar-e Anzali
19:45 UTC+4:30	Rafkhaei 44'; Zare 87' (pen.); Salarzadeh (yellow card); Feshangchi (yellow card); Yousefi (yellow card)	Summary	M.Nazari (yellow card); Traoré (yellow card); Salehi 90'	Stadium: Takhti Stadium; Attendance: 5,000; Referee: Ashkan Khorshidi

16 August 2013 5	Esteghlal Khuzestan	2 – 4	Naft Tehran	Ahvaz
20:30 UTC+4:30	Mobali 44' 71' (pen.); Bakhtiarizadeh (yellow card)	Summary	Oladi 10'; Norouzi 12', 16'; Navidkia 83'; Hajmohammadi (yellow card)	Stadium: Takhti Stadium; Attendance: 2,000; Referee: Mohsen Ghahremani

23 August 2013 6	Foolad	3 – 2	Esteghlal Khuzestan	Ahvaz
19:45 UTC+4:30	Hatami 28'; Rahmani 34'; Rafiei 83'; Yousefi (yellow card)	Summary	Meydavoudi 3'; Kheiri 90+1'; Tayyebi (yellow card) (yellow-red card) 32'; Bakhtiarizadeh (yellow card); Khanifar (yellow card)	Stadium: Takhti Stadium; Attendance: 10,000; Referee: Mehdi Seyedali

31 August 2013 7	Esteghlal Khuzestan	2 – 0	Esteghlal	Ahvaz
19:00 UTC+4:30	Kolahkaj 38'; Bigdeli 75'; Kaebi (yellow card)	Summary	Montazeri (yellow card)	Stadium: Takhti Stadium; Attendance: 10,000; Referee: Mohammadreza Akbarian

5 September 2013 8	Gostaresh Foulad	1 – 1	Esteghlal Khuzestan	Tabriz
18:00 UTC+4:30	Mohammadpouri 90'	Summary	Meydavoudi 10'; Traoré (yellow card); Mahmoudi (yellow card)	Stadium: Yadegar-e Emam Stadium; Attendance: 1,000; Referee: Majid Kamani

13 September 2013 9	Esteghlal Khuzestan	0 – 2	Sepahan	Ahvaz
18:45 UTC+4:30	Kaebi (yellow card); Meydavoudi (yellow card)	Summary	Gholami 10'; Aghily 69'; Papi (yellow card); Khalilzadeh (yellow card); Đalović (yellow card); Ahmadi (yellow card)	Stadium: Takhti Stadium; Referee: Mouood Bonyadifar

20 September 2013 10	Shahid Sepasi	2 – 1	Esteghlal Khuzestan	Shiraz
17:15 UTC+4:30	Ansari 38'; Madanchi (yellow card); Heidari 77'	Summary	Meydavoudi 14'; Traoré (yellow card); Mahmoudi (yellow card)	Stadium: Hafezieh Stadium; Referee: Hasan Akbari

27 September 2013 11	Esteghlal Khuzestan	1 – 0	Saba Qom	Ahvaz
18:30 UTC+4:30	Bakhtiarizadeh 90+1'; M.Noami (yellow card); Shaverdi (yellow card)	Summary	Momeni (yellow card); Hosseini (yellow card)	Stadium: Takhti Stadium; Referee: Farshid Afshar

4 October 2013 12	Damash Gilan	0 – 0	Esteghlal Khuzestan	Rasht
17:00 UTC+4:30		Summary	Tayyebi (yellow card); Kheiri (yellow card); Traoré (yellow card)	Stadium: Shahid Dr. Azodi Stadium; Referee: Jamshid Mohammadi

17 October 2013 13	Esteghlal Khuzestan	3 – 2	Rah Ahan	Ahvaz
18:00 UTC+4:30	Alvanzadeh 16'; Kheiri 56'; Salehi 65'; Bakhtiarizadeh (yellow card)	Report	Barzay 18'; Manouchehri 89'; M.Zarei (yellow card); Rezaian (yellow card); Zamani (yellow card)	Stadium: Takhti Stadium; Referee: Bijan Heydari

27 October 2013 14	Esteghlal Khuzestan	1 – 4	Tractor Sazi	Ahvaz
15:30 UTC+3:30	Meydavoudi 44'; A.Khallafzadeh (yellow card); Mobali (yellow card)	Summary	Ansarifard 8', 83', 88'; Gordani 43'; Ahmadzadeh (yellow card); Kiani (yellow card); Fakhreddini (yellow card); Asadi (yellow card)	Stadium: Takhti Stadium; Referee: Jamshid Daneshmehr

6 November 2013 15	Persepolis	0 – 0	Esteghlal Khuzestan	Tehran
15:15 UTC+3:30	Hosseini (yellow card); Sadeghian (yellow card); Aliasgari (yellow card)	Summary	Bakhtiarizadeh (yellow card); Salehi (yellow card); Kheiri (yellow card)	Stadium: Azadi Stadium; Referee: Mohammadreza Akbarian

28 November 2013 16	Zob Ahan	0 – 1	Esteghlal Khuzestan	Isfahan
15:00 UTC+3:30	Tabrizi (yellow card); S.Abdollahpour (yellow card)	Report	Salehi 38'; Coulibaly (yellow card)	Stadium: Foolad Shahr Stadium; Referee: Majid Kamani

6 December 2013 17	Esteghlal Khuzestan	1 – 1	Mes Kerman	Ahvaz
15:00 UTC+3:30	Ta'mini 65' (o.g.); Tighnavard (red card) 90+2'; Meydavoudi (yellow card)	Report	Rezaei (yellow card); Ta'mini 78'	Stadium: Takhti Stadium; Referee: Hassan Akrami

12 December 2013 18	Saipa	1 – 1	Esteghlal Khuzestan	Karaj
15:00 UTC+3:30	Sobhani 24' (red card) 79'; Zeinali (red card) 90'	Report	Ousani (yellow card); Tayyebi 77'	Stadium: Enghelab Stadium; Referee: Ghasem Vahedi

19 December 2013 19	Esteghlal Khuzestan	0 – 2	Malavan	Ahvaz
15:00 UTC+3:30	Karimi (yellow card)	Summary	Kouroshi 54'; Rafkhaei 61' (pen.)	Stadium: Takhti Stadium; Referee: Babak Vasilehbar

24 December 2013 20	Naft Tehran	0 – 0	Esteghlal Khuzestan	Tehran
15:00 UTC+3:30	V.Ghafouri (yellow card)	Summary	Bakhtiarizadeh (yellow card); Tighnavard (yellow card); A.Ahaki	Stadium: Takhti Stadium; Referee: Shahin Haj Babaei

3 January 2014 21	Esteghlal Khuzestan	0 – 2	Foolad	Ahvaz
15:00 UTC+3:30	Kaebi (yellow card); Jafari (yellow card); Ousani (yellow card)	Summary	Sharifat 33', 90+2'; Vali (yellow card); Rahmani (yellow card)	Stadium: Takhti Stadium; Referee: Ahmad Salehi

11 January 2014 22	Esteghlal	1 – 0	Esteghlal Khuzestan	Tehran
16:40 UTC+3:30	Ghazi 75'; Samuel (yellow card); Nikbakht (yellow card)	Summary	Bakhtiarizadeh (yellow card)	Stadium: Azadi Stadium; Referee: Shahin Haj Babaei

16 January 2014 23	Esteghlal Khuzestan	3 – 1	Gostaresh Foulad	Ahvaz
15:00 UTC+3:30	Tighnavard 57'; Coulibaly 72' (yellow card); A.Khalafzadeh 85'; Traoré (yellow card)	Summary	Mousavi 89'	Stadium: Takhti Stadium; Referee: Mehdi Seyedali

26 January 2014 24	Sepahan	3 – 1	Esteghlal Khuzestan	Fuladshahr
14:30 UTC+3:30	Karimi 35'; Sharifi 45+1'; Aghily 70'	Summary	Kheiri 76'; Khosravi (yellow card)	Stadium: Foolad Shahr Stadium; Referee: Ghasem Vahedi

31 January 2014 25	Esteghlal Khuzestan	0 – 0	Shahid Sepasi	Ahvaz
15:00 UTC+3:30	M.Tayebi (yellow card); Meydavoudi (yellow card)	Summary	Jokar (yellow card)	Stadium: Takhti Stadium; Referee: Ahamd Salehi

7 February 2014 26	Saba Qom	1 – 1	Esteghlal Khuzestan	Qom
15:00 UTC+3:30	Enayati 78' (pen.); Sadeghi (yellow card); Lotfi (yellow card)	Summary	Salehi 2'; M.Tayebi (yellow card)	Stadium: Yadegar-e Emam Stadium; Referee: Hassan Akrami

16 February 2014 27	Esteghlal Khuzestan	1 – 1	Damash Gilan	Ahvaz
15:30 UTC+3:30	Coulibaly 84' (pen.); Traoré (yellow card); Meydavoudi (yellow card)	Summary	Motevaselzadeh 71'; Hassanzadeh (yellow card)	Stadium: Takhti Stadium; Referee: Rasoul Rahbarfam

27 March 2014 28	Rah Ahan	1 – 0	Esteghlal Khuzestan	Tehran
16:30 UTC+3:30	Alipour 60'; Ashoubi (red card) 68'	Summary		Stadium: Shahid Dastgerdi Stadium; Referee: Mohammadreza Akbarian

6 April 2014 29	Tractor Sazi	1 – 0	Esteghlal Khuzestan	Tabriz
17:30 UTC+4:30	Ansarifard 14'; Lak (yellow card)	Summary	Karimi (yellow card); Shaverdi (yellow card); Salehi (yellow card)	Stadium: Yadegar-e Emam Stadium; Referee: Mehdi Seyedali

11 April 2014 30	Esteghlal Khuzestan	0 – 1	Persepolis	Ahvaz
19:00 UTC+4:30	Kaebi (yellow card); Traoré (yellow card); Coulibaly (yellow card)	Summary	Abbaszadeh 31' (pen.); Alishah (yellow card); Sadeghian (yellow card); Kafshgari (yellow card)	Stadium: Takhti Stadium; Referee: Yadollah Jahanbazi

=== Hazfi Cup ===
23 October 2013 Round of 32	Alvand Hamedan	1 – 1 (6 – 5 p)	Esteghlal Khuzestan	Hamedan
15:00 UTC+4:30	Akbari 58'	[ Summary]	Traoré 29' (pen.)	Stadium: Qods Stadium; Attendance: 3,000

== Squad statistics ==
=== Appearances and goals ===
No.	Pos	Nat	Player	Total		Iran Pro League		Hazfi Cup	
No.	Pos	Nat	Player	Apps	Goals	Apps	Goals	Apps	Goals
1	GK	(Brazil) BRA	Fábio Carvalho	8	0	8	0	0	0
2	DF	(Iran) IRI	Mohammad Tayyebi	27	1	26+1	1	0	0
4	DF	(Iran) IRI	Sohrab Bakhtiarizadeh	16	1	16	1	0	0
7	MF	(Iran) IRI	Mehdi Chahkoutahzadeh	11	1	6+5	1	0	0
8	MF	(Mali) MLI	Idrissa Traoré	25	0	23+2	0	0	0
9	MF	(Iran) IRI	Mahmoud Tighnavard	12	1	12	1	0	0
10	FW	(Iran) IRI	Milad Meydavoudi	29	5	26+3	5	0	0
11	FW	(Iran) IRI	Mohammad Mo'avi	13	0	3+10	0	0	0
12	MF	(Mali) MLI	Moussa Coulibaly	16	2	16	2	0	0
13	DF	(Iran) IRI	Hossein Kaebi	20	0	17+3	0	0	0
14	MF	(Iran) IRI	Mehdi Kheiri	24	3	13+11	3	0	0
15	MF	(Iran) IRI	Karim Shaverdi	9	0	8+1	0	0	0
16	FW	(Iran) IRI	Ebrahim Salehi	18	4	11+7	4	0	0
19	MF	(Iran) IRI	Ali Bigdeli	12	1	12	1	0	0
20	MF	(Iran) IRI	Hadi Khanifar	26	0	22+4	0	0	0
21	FW	(Iran) IRI	Shahrokh Shams	17	0	5+12	0	0	0
22	GK	(Iran) IRI	Parviz Karimi	22	0	22	0	0	0
24	DF	(Iran) IRI	Ala Khalafzadeh	7	1	5+2	1	0	0
25	DF	(Iran) IRI	Farzad Jafari	6	0	5+1	0	0	0
27	FW	(Iran) IRI	Ehsan Alvanzadeh	5	1	4+1	1	0	0
29	MF	(Iran) IRI	Ramin Khosravi	12	0	12	0	0	0
30	FW	(Iran) IRI	Mohammad Ousani	9	0	6+3	0	0	0
33	GK	(Iran) IRI	Ali Akbar Ahaki	1	0	0+1	0	0	0
40	MF	(Iran) IRI	Adel Kolahkaj	20	2	17+3	2	0	0
66	DF	(Iran) IRI	Saeid Chahjouei	4	0	4	0	0	0
Players who left Esteghlal Khuzestan during the season:
3	DF	(Iran) IRI	Mehdi Nazari	4	0	3+1	0	0	0
5	DF	(Iran) IRI	Hamed Mahmoudi	4	0	4	0	0	0
6	MF	(Iran) IRI	Mansour Noami	4	0	2+2	0	0	0
17	DF	(Iran) IRI	Ramtin Soleimanzadeh	12	0	12	0	0	0
23	MF	(Iran) IRI	Iman Mobali	25	2	24+1	2	0	0

=== Goal scorers ===
Place	Position	Nation	Number	Name	Persian Gulf Cup	Hazfi Cup	Total
1	FW	(Iran)	10	Milad Meydavoudi	5	0	5
2	FW	(Iran)	16	Ebrahim Salehi	4	0	4
3	MF	(Iran)	14	Mehdi Kheiri	3	0	3
4	MF	(Iran)	40	Adel Kolahkaj	2	0	2
4	MF	(Iran)	23	Iman Mobali	2	0	2
4	DF	(Mali)	12	Moussa Coulibaly	2	0	2
7	MF	(Iran)	7	Mehdi Chahkoutahzadeh	1	0	0
7	MF	(Iran)	19	Ali Bigdeli	1	0	1
7	DF	(Iran)	4	Sohrab Bakhtiarizadeh	1	0	1
7	FW	(Iran)	27	Ehsan Alvanzadeh	1	0	1
7	DF	(Iran)	2	Mohammad Tayyebi	1	0	1
7	MF	(Iran)	9	Mahmoud Tighnavard	1	0	1
7	DF	(Iran)	24	Ala Khalafzadeh	1	0	1
7	MF	(Mali)	8	Idrissa Traoré	0	1	1
7				Own goal	1	0	1
TOTALS					26	1	27
