= List of Iranian football transfers winter 2013–14 =

This is a list of Iranian football transfers for the 2013–14 winter transfer window. Transfers of Iran Pro League is listed.

== Rules and regulations ==
The Iranian Football Clubs who participate in 2013–14 Iran Pro League are allowed to have up to maximum 38 players (including up to maximum 4 non-Iranian players) in their player lists, which will be categorized in the following groups:

- Up to maximum 21 adult (without any age limit) players
- Up to maximum 9 under-23 players (i.e. the player whose birth is after 21 March 1990).
- Up to maximum 5 under-21 players (i.e. the player whose birth is after 1 January 1993).
- Up to maximum 3 under-19 players (i.e. the player whose birth is after 1 January 1995).

According to Iran Football Federation rules for 2013-14 Football Season, each Football Club is allowed to take up to maximum 6 new players . In addition to these six new players, each club is allowed to take up to maximum 4 non-Iranian new players (at least one of them should be Asian) and up to 3 players from Free agent (who did not play in 2012–13 Iran Pro League season or doesn't list in any 2013–14 League after season's start).

== Iran Pro League ==
=== Damash ===
In: Note: Flags indicate national team as defined under FIFA eligibility rules; some limited exceptions apply. Players may hold more than one non-FIFA nationality.

| No. | Pos. | Nation | Player |
|---|---|---|---|
| 15 | MF | IRN | Mohammad Dadresi (from Free agent) |
| 25 | MF | IRN | Mohammad Ali Rahimi (promoted from Damash U21) |
| 40 | | IRN | Mostafa Molaei (from Free agent) |
| 49 | | IRN | Keyvan Karimtabar (from Free agent) |

Out: Note: Flags indicate national team as defined under FIFA eligibility rules; some limited exceptions apply. Players may hold more than one non-FIFA nationality.

| No. | Pos. | Nation | Player |
|---|---|---|---|
| 3 | DF | BRA | Arilson (Released) |
| 19 | FW | FRA | Boubacar Kébé (to Esteghlal) |
| 77 | FW | IRN | Jahangir Asgari (to Paykan) |
| 13 | MF | IRN | Mohammad Abshak (to Mes Kerman) |
| 5 | FW | IRN | Saeid Hallafi (to Paykan) |
| 10 | FW | IRN | Afshin Chavoshi (to Aluminium) |

=== Esteghlal ===
In: Note: Flags indicate national team as defined under FIFA eligibility rules; some limited exceptions apply. Players may hold more than one non-FIFA nationality.

| No. | Pos. | Nation | Player |
|---|---|---|---|
| 19 | FW | FRA | Boubacar Kébé (from Damash) |
| 77 | FW | IRN | Mehrdad Oladi (from Naft Tehran) |
| 34 | MF | IRN | Iman Basafa (from Free agent) |
| 70 | DF | IRN | Majid Gholamnejad (from Saipa) |
| 27 | MF | BRA | Antonio Carvalho (from (Brazil) Boavista) |
| 23 | MF | IRN | Iman Mobali (on loan from Esteghlal Khuzestan) |

Out: Note: Flags indicate national team as defined under FIFA eligibility rules; some limited exceptions apply. Players may hold more than one non-FIFA nationality.

| No. | Pos. | Nation | Player |
|---|---|---|---|
| 7 | FW | IRN | Farhad Majidi (Retired) |
| 26 | DF | IRN | Fardin Abedini (to Gostaresh Foolad) |
| 28 | MF | IRN | Mehran Ghasemi (to Zob Ahan) |
| 15 | MF | IRN | Ehsan Pirhadi (to Pas Hamedan) |
| 31 | MF | SRB | Goran Lovre (to (Germany) SSV Ulm 1846) |
| 33 | DF | IRN | Pejman Montazeri (to (Qatar) Umm Salal) |
| 6 | MF | IRN | Javad Nekounam (to Al-Kuwait) |

=== Esteghlal Khuzestan ===
In: Note: Flags indicate national team as defined under FIFA eligibility rules; some limited exceptions apply. Players may hold more than one non-FIFA nationality.

| No. | Pos. | Nation | Player |
|---|---|---|---|
| 25 | DF | IRN | Farzad Jafari (from Esteghlal Ahvaz) |
| 9 | MF | IRN | Mahmoud Tighnavard (from Mes Kerman) |
| 66 | DF | IRN | Saeid Chahjouei (from Shahrdari Bandar Abbas) |
| 29 | DF | IRN | Mohammad Ebrahim Khosravi (from Alvand Hamedan) |
| 30 | FW | IRN | Mohammad Ousani (from Shahrdari Dezful) |

Out: Note: Flags indicate national team as defined under FIFA eligibility rules; some limited exceptions apply. Players may hold more than one non-FIFA nationality.

| No. | Pos. | Nation | Player |
|---|---|---|---|
| 3 | DF | IRN | Mehdi Nazari (to Badr Hormozgan) |
| 5 | DF | IRN | Hamed Mahmoudi (to Shahrdari Tabriz) |
| 6 | MF | IRN | Mansour Noami (to Badr Hormozgan) |
| 17 | DF | IRN | Ramtin Soleymanzadeh (On loan at Fajr Sepasi) |
| 23 | MF | IRN | Iman Mobali (on loan at Esteghlal) |

=== Fajr Sepasi ===
In: Note: Flags indicate national team as defined under FIFA eligibility rules; some limited exceptions apply. Players may hold more than one non-FIFA nationality.

| No. | Pos. | Nation | Player |
|---|---|---|---|
| 25 | DF | IRN | Samad Zare (from Free agent) |
| 33 | MF | BIH | Samir Bekrić (from Mes Kerman) |
| 29 | FW | IRN | Mohammad Nozhati (from Naft Tehran) |
| 38 | MF | IRN | Meysam Khodashenas (from Nassaji) |
| 16 | MF | IRN | Arman Ramezani (On loan from Malavan) |
| 27 | MF | IRN | Bahram Rashid Farrokhi (from Free agent) |
| 26 | DF | IRN | Ramtin Soleymanzadeh (On loan from Esteghlal Khuzestan) |
| — | GK | IRN | Hadi Rish Esfahani (from Shahrdari Bandar Abbas) |

Out: Note: Flags indicate national team as defined under FIFA eligibility rules; some limited exceptions apply. Players may hold more than one non-FIFA nationality.

| No. | Pos. | Nation | Player |
|---|---|---|---|
| 2 | MF | IRN | Hadi Daghagheleh (to Malavan) |
| 7 | FW | IRN | Jaber Ansari (to Gostaresh Foolad) |
| 3 | DF | IRN | Mostafa Sabri (Released) |
| 15 | MF | IRN | Behnam Askarkhani (to Alvand Hamedan) |
| 19 | FW | IRN | Foad Aghaei (to Sanat Naft) |
| 22 | MF | IRN | Hossein Karimi (to Paykan) |
| 1 | GK | IRN | Vahid Sheikhveisi (to Naft Tehran) |
| 24 | FW | IRN | Dariush Shojaeian (to Alvand Hamedan) |
| 40 | FW | IRN | Mojtaba Zare (to Paykan) |

=== Foolad ===
In: Note: Flags indicate national team as defined under FIFA eligibility rules; some limited exceptions apply. Players may hold more than one non-FIFA nationality.

| No. | Pos. | Nation | Player |
|---|---|---|---|
| 77 | GK | IRN | Sosha Makani (from Naft Tehran) |
| 37 | FW | IRN | Gholamreza Rezaei (from Persepolis) |
| 55 | DF | IRN | Saeed Salarzadeh (from Malavan) |
| 16 | FW | IRN | Arash Afshin (from Sepahan) |
| 26 | DF | IRN | Yousef Vakia (promoted from Foolad U21) |
| 2 | DF | BRA | Leandro Padovani (from (Qatar) Al Rayyan) |

Out: Note: Flags indicate national team as defined under FIFA eligibility rules; some limited exceptions apply. Players may hold more than one non-FIFA nationality.

| No. | Pos. | Nation | Player |
|---|---|---|---|
| 40 | FW | IRN | Farzad Hatami (to Persepolis) |
| 22 | GK | IRN | Mohammad Rashid Mazaheri (to Zob Ahan) |
| 3 | DF | BRA | Serjão (Released) |

=== Gostaresh Foolad ===
In: Note: Flags indicate national team as defined under FIFA eligibility rules; some limited exceptions apply. Players may hold more than one non-FIFA nationality.

| No. | Pos. | Nation | Player |
|---|---|---|---|
| 26 | DF | IRN | Fardin Abedini (from Esteghlal) |
| 24 | DF | IRN | Mohsen Hosseini (from Tractor Sazi) |
| 18 | FW | IRN | Yousef Seyedi (from Zob Ahan Ardabil) |
| 77 | DF | IRN | Mostafa Ekrami (from Zob Ahan) |
| 88 | FW | IRN | Jaber Ansari (from Fajr Sepasi) |
| 32 | MF | IRN | Farshad Pourkhanmohammadi (from Gostaresh Foolad U21) |
| 21 | MF | IRN | Kianoush Mirzaei (from Parseh) |

Out: Note: Flags indicate national team as defined under FIFA eligibility rules; some limited exceptions apply. Players may hold more than one non-FIFA nationality.

| No. | Pos. | Nation | Player |
|---|---|---|---|
| 99 | FW | IRN | Rasoul Khatibi (Retired) |
| 40 | MF | IRN | Saeid Aghaei (to Tractor Sazi) |
| 17 | MF | IRN | Mohammadreza Zeynalkheyri (to Saipa) |
| 28 | FW | IRN | Ali Younesi (to Saipa) |
| 30 | DF | PER | Diego Chávarri (Loan return to (Peru) Unión Comercio) |
| 33 | GK | IRN | Mohammad Nasseri (Demoted to Gostaresh Foolad U21) |

=== Malavan ===
In: Note: Flags indicate national team as defined under FIFA eligibility rules; some limited exceptions apply. Players may hold more than one non-FIFA nationality.

| No. | Pos. | Nation | Player |
|---|---|---|---|
| 77 | MF | IRN | Hadi Daghagheleh (from Fajr Sepasi) |
| 88 | MF | IRN | Milad Zeneyedpour (from Zob Ahan) |
| 39 | GK | IRN | Mehdi Sabeti (from Saipa) |

Out: Note: Flags indicate national team as defined under FIFA eligibility rules; some limited exceptions apply. Players may hold more than one non-FIFA nationality.

| No. | Pos. | Nation | Player |
|---|---|---|---|
| 15 | DF | IRN | Saeed Salarzadeh (to Foolad) |
| 8 | DF | IRN | Hassan Ashjari (to Pas Hamedan) |
| 21 | MF | CRO | Ivor Weitzer (to (Croatia) NK Zadar) |
| 27 | MF | IRN | Arman Ramezani (On loan at Fajr Sepasi) |
| 1 | GK | MDA | Serghei Paşcenco (Released) |
| 28 | MF | IRN | Mohammad Jafari (On loan at Gahar Zagros) |
| 4 | MF | IRN | Soheil Asgharzadeh (On loan at Gahar Zagros) |
| 39 | GK | IRN | Mehdi Sabeti (Released) |

=== Mes Kerman ===
In: Note: Flags indicate national team as defined under FIFA eligibility rules; some limited exceptions apply. Players may hold more than one non-FIFA nationality.

| No. | Pos. | Nation | Player |
|---|---|---|---|
| 66 | DF | IRN | Hadi Tamini (from Zob Ahan) |
| 15 | MF | IRN | Kianoush Rahmati (from Saipa) |
| 24 | MF | IRN | Mohammad Abshak (from Damash) |
| 90 | DF | IRN | Sheys Rezaei (from Free agent) |
| 40 | FW | IRN | Ehsan Poursheikhali (from Free agent) |
| 26 | MF | BRA | Jose Tadeo Martines (from Free agent) |

Out: Note: Flags indicate national team as defined under FIFA eligibility rules; some limited exceptions apply. Players may hold more than one non-FIFA nationality.

| No. | Pos. | Nation | Player |
|---|---|---|---|
| 4 | DF | IRN | Esmaeil Mohammad Shirazi (to Naft Masjed Soleyman) |
| 9 | MF | IRN | Mahmoud Tighnavard (to Esteghlal Khuzestan) |
| 25 | FW | IRN | Farzad Mohammadi (to Naft Masjed Soleyman) |
| 18 | MF | BIH | Samir Bekrić (to Fajr Sepasi) |
| 20 | DF | IRN | Ebarhim Abarghouei (to Aluminium Hormozgan) |

=== Naft Tehran ===
In: Note: Flags indicate national team as defined under FIFA eligibility rules; some limited exceptions apply. Players may hold more than one non-FIFA nationality.

| No. | Pos. | Nation | Player |
|---|---|---|---|
| 33 | MF | IRN | Vahid Zolghadr (promoted from Parseh Tehran U21) |
| 32 | FW | IRN | Hadi Norouzi (On loan from Persepolis) |
| 16 | GK | IRN | Vahid Sheikhveisi (from Fajr Sepasi) |
| 70 | FW | IRN | Mojtaba Shiri (from Rah Ahan Sorinet) |
| 34 | MF | IRN | Ahmad Firouz Samadi (promoted from Naft Tehran U21) |

Out: Note: Flags indicate national team as defined under FIFA eligibility rules; some limited exceptions apply. Players may hold more than one non-FIFA nationality.

| No. | Pos. | Nation | Player |
|---|---|---|---|
| 7 | FW | IRN | Mehrdad Oladi (to Esteghlal) |
| 99 | GK | IRN | Sosha Makani (to Foolad) |
| 18 | FW | IRN | Mohammad Nozhati (to Fajr Sepasi) |

=== Persepolis ===
In: Note: Flags indicate national team as defined under FIFA eligibility rules; some limited exceptions apply. Players may hold more than one non-FIFA nationality.

| No. | Pos. | Nation | Player |
|---|---|---|---|
| 15 | DF | IRN | Hossein Kanaani (Loan return from (Portugal) Beira-Mar) |
| 77 | MF | IRN | Mohsen Mosalman (On loan from Zob Ahan) |
| 64 | FW | IRN | Farzad Hatami (from Foolad) |

Out: Note: Flags indicate national team as defined under FIFA eligibility rules; some limited exceptions apply. Players may hold more than one non-FIFA nationality.

| No. | Pos. | Nation | Player |
|---|---|---|---|
| 10 | FW | IRN | Gholamreza Rezaei (to Foolad) |
| 3 | DF | IRN | Mohammadreza Khanzadeh (On loan at Zob Ahan) |
| 22 | FW | IRN | Milad Gharibi (On loan at Zob Ahan) |
| 24 | FW | IRN | Hadi Norouzi (On loan at Naft Tehran) |
| 17 | FW | IRN | Younes Shakeri (On loan at Padideh) |
| 88 | GK | IRN | Alireza Haghighi (Loan return to (Russia) Rubin Kazan) |
| 8 | MF | MNE | Marko Šćepanović (to Mladost Podgorica) |

=== Rah Ahan Sorinet ===
In: Note: Flags indicate national team as defined under FIFA eligibility rules; some limited exceptions apply. Players may hold more than one non-FIFA nationality.

| No. | Pos. | Nation | Player |
|---|---|---|---|
| 12 | MF | IRN | Mehdi Mehdipour (from Zob Ahan U21) |
| 25 | MF | CMR | David Wirikom (from Rahian Kermanshah) |
| 77 | DF | IRN | Arman Ghasemi (from Giti Pasand) |
| 40 | DF | IRN | Belash Hosseini (promoted from Rah Ahan Sorinet U21) |

Out: Note: Flags indicate national team as defined under FIFA eligibility rules; some limited exceptions apply. Players may hold more than one non-FIFA nationality.

| No. | Pos. | Nation | Player |
|---|---|---|---|
| 13 | MF | BRA | Marcos Bonfim (Released) |
| 19 | DF | ARM | Valeri Aleksanyan (Released) |
| 90 | FW | IRN | Akbar Saghiri (Released) |
| 9 | FW | IRN | Mojtaba Shiri (to Naft Tehran) |
| 30 | GK | IRN | Vahid Taleblou (Released) |

=== Saba Qom ===
In: Note: Flags indicate national team as defined under FIFA eligibility rules; some limited exceptions apply. Players may hold more than one non-FIFA nationality.

| No. | Pos. | Nation | Player |
|---|---|---|---|
| 92 | MF | IRN | Hossein Badamaki (from Padideh) |
| 6 | DF | IRN | Hadi Shakouri (from Padideh) |

Out: Note: Flags indicate national team as defined under FIFA eligibility rules; some limited exceptions apply. Players may hold more than one non-FIFA nationality.

| No. | Pos. | Nation | Player |

=== Saipa ===
In: Note: Flags indicate national team as defined under FIFA eligibility rules; some limited exceptions apply. Players may hold more than one non-FIFA nationality.

| No. | Pos. | Nation | Player |
|---|---|---|---|
| 44 | MF | IRN | Mohammadreza Zeynalkheyri (from Gostaresh Foolad) |
| 55 | FW | IRN | Ali Younesi (from Gostaresh Foolad) |
| 32 | FW | IRN | Ali Gholizadeh (promoted from Saipa U21) |
| 35 | MF | IRN | Alireza Alizadeh (promoted from Saipa U21) |
| 33 | GK | IRN | Mohammadreza Akhbari Shad (promoted from Saipa U21) |
| 36 | MF | IRN | Reza Jafari (promoted from Saipa U21) |

Out: Note: Flags indicate national team as defined under FIFA eligibility rules; some limited exceptions apply. Players may hold more than one non-FIFA nationality.

| No. | Pos. | Nation | Player |
|---|---|---|---|
| 17 | FW | ROU | Cosmin Vancea (to (Romania) CSM Studențesc Iași) |
| 2 | MF | IRN | Shoeib Amiri (to Persepolis Shomal) |
| 12 | GK | IRN | Mehdi Sabeti (to Malavan) |
| 14 | MF | IRN | Kianoush Rahmati (to Mes Kerman) |
| 15 | MF | IRN | Davoud Shahvaraghi (to Esteghlal Ahvaz) |
| 22 | MF | IRN | Milad Bakhtiarizadeh (Released) |
| 25 | DF | IRN | Milad Nosrati (to Nirouye Zamini) |
| 7 | DF | IRN | Majid Gholamnejad (to Esteghlal) |

=== Sepahan ===
In: Note: Flags indicate national team as defined under FIFA eligibility rules; some limited exceptions apply. Players may hold more than one non-FIFA nationality.

| No. | Pos. | Nation | Player |
|---|---|---|---|
| 99 | MF | IRN | Amir Hossein Karimi (promoted from Sepahan U21) |
| 45 | MF | IRN | Ehsan Pahlevan (on loan from Zob Ahan) |
| 17 | MF | IRN | Milad Sarlak (promoted from Sepahan U21) |
| 24 | DF | IRN | Armin Sohrabian (promoted from Sepahan U21) |
| 39 | DF | IRN | Mohammad Roshandel (promoted from Sepahan U21) |
| 16 | FW | IDN | Sergio van Dijk (from (Indonesia) Persib Bandung) |

Out: Note: Flags indicate national team as defined under FIFA eligibility rules; some limited exceptions apply. Players may hold more than one non-FIFA nationality.

| No. | Pos. | Nation | Player |
|---|---|---|---|
| 8 | MF | IRN | Mojtaba Jabbari (to (Qatar) Al Ahli) |
| 11 | DF | IRN | Mohsen Irannejad (On loan at Zob Ahan) |
| 10 | FW | IRN | Arash Afshin (to Foolad) |
| 21 | FW | MNE | Radomir Đalović (to (China) Shenxin) |

=== Tractor Sazi ===
In: Note: Flags indicate national team as defined under FIFA eligibility rules; some limited exceptions apply. Players may hold more than one non-FIFA nationality.

| No. | Pos. | Nation | Player |
|---|---|---|---|
| 40 | MF | IRN | Saeid Aghaei (from Gostaresh Foolad) |
| 28 | MF | IRN | Mohammad Hossein Mehrazma (from Naft Tehran) |
| 18 | MF | BRA | Rodrigo Pimpão (from (Brazil) América) |

Out: Note: Flags indicate national team as defined under FIFA eligibility rules; some limited exceptions apply. Players may hold more than one non-FIFA nationality.

| No. | Pos. | Nation | Player |
|---|---|---|---|
| 77 | MF | SRB | Marko Bašara (to (Bosnia and Herzegovina) FK Borac Banja Luka) |
| 44 | DF | IRN | Mohsen Hosseini (to Gostaresh Foolad) |
| 18 | MF | BRA | Rodrigo Pimpão (Released) |

=== Zob Ahan ===
In: Note: Flags indicate national team as defined under FIFA eligibility rules; some limited exceptions apply. Players may hold more than one non-FIFA nationality.

| No. | Pos. | Nation | Player |
|---|---|---|---|
| 28 | DF | BRA | Carlos Santos (from (Saudi Arabia) Ettifaq) |
| 70 | DF | IRN | Mohammadreza Khanzadeh (On loan from Persepolis) |
| 99 | FW | IRN | Milad Gharibi (On loan from Persepolis) |
| 21 | MF | IRN | Mehran Ghasemi (from Esteghlal) |
| 13 | DF | IRN | Mohsen Irannejad (On loan from Sepahan) |
| 12 | GK | IRN | Mohammad Rashid Mazaheri (from Foolad) |
| 36 | MF | IRN | Pejman Ghermezi (from Zob Ahan Novin) |
| 37 | FW | IRN | Farid Mokhtari (from Zob Ahan Novin) |
| — | DF | IRN | Mostafa Hashemi (from Danesh Feridunkenar) |
| — | FW | IRN | Mostafa Zakariapour (from Danesh Feridunkenar) |
| 77 | FW | COL | Víctor Guazá (from (Peru) Universidad Técnica de Cajamarca) |

Out: Note: Flags indicate national team as defined under FIFA eligibility rules; some limited exceptions apply. Players may hold more than one non-FIFA nationality.

| No. | Pos. | Nation | Player |
|---|---|---|---|
| 34 | MF | IRN | Mehdi Mehdipour (to Rah Ahan Sorinet) |
| 22 | GK | ARM | Gevorg Kasparov (to (Armenia) Mika Yerevan) |
| 5 | DF | IRN | Hadi Tamini (to Mes Kerman) |
| 14 | MF | IRN | Milad Zeneyedpour (to Malavan) |
| 32 | DF | IRN | Mostafa Ekrami (to Gostaresh Foolad) |
| 11 | MF | IRN | Mohsen Mosalman (On loan at Persepolis) |
| 1 | GK | IRN | Masoud Homami (to Paykan) |
| 15 | MF | IRN | Ehsan Pahlevan (On loan at Sepahan) |
| 2 | DF | IRN | Alireza Mohammad (to Paykan) |
| 24 | MF | IRN | Hossein Doustdar (to Gitipasand) |
| 35 | MF | IRN | Alireza Arab (Released) |
| 18 | MF | IRN | Vahid Aliabadi (Released) |
