= Ali Asghar Ashouri =

Iranian footballer

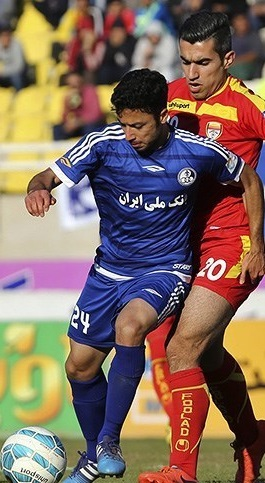

Personal information
- Full name: Ali Asghar Ashouri
- Date of birth: 9 October 1988 (age 38)
- Place of birth: Hamedan, Iran
- Height: 1.74 m (5 ft 8 1/2 in)
- Position: Midfielder

Team information
- Current team: Gol Gohar Sirjan
- Number: 8

Youth career
- Shahrdari Hamedan

Senior career*
Years	Team	Apps	(Gls)
2009–2010	Shahrdari Hamedan		(0)
2010–2012	Pas Novin Hamedan		(20)
2012–2014	Alvand Hamedan	42	(7)
2014–2015	Foolad B	21	(7)
2015–2017	Esteghlal Khuzestan	45	(7)
2017–2018	Foolad	26	(4)
2018–2020	Nassaji Mazandaran	52	(4)
2020–	Gol Gohar Sirjan	101	(8)
- * Club domestic league appearances and goals as of 9 November 2018

Ali Asghar "Navid" Ashouri (Persian: علی‌اصغر عاشوری) is an Iranian football midfielder who plays for Gol Gohar Sirjan in the Persian Gulf Pro League.

== Club career ==
Ashouri started his career with his home side Shahrdari Hamedan. Later he joined to Pas Hamedan and Alvand Hamedan. In summer 2014, he joined to Foolad Novin and helped them in promoting to Persian Gulf Pro League with scoring 7 times in 21 match. In summer 2015 he joined to Esteghlal Khuzestan with a 2 years contract. He made his debut for Esteghlal Khuzestan on 30 July 2015 against Sepahan as a substitute for Hadi Khanifar.

== Club career statistics ==
As of 25 December 2017.

Club	Division	Season	League		Hazfi Cup		Asia		Other		Total	
Club	Division	Season	Apps	Goals	Apps	Goals	Apps	Goals	Apps	Goals	Apps	Goals
Alvand Hamedan	Division 1	2012–13	18	6	0	0	–	–	0	0	18	6
Alvand Hamedan	Division 1	2013–14	23	1	4	1	–	–	0	0	27	2
Alvand Hamedan	Total		41	7	4	1	0	0	0	0	45	8
Foolad Novin	Azadegan League	2014–15	21	7	3	2	–	–	0	0	24	9
Esteghlal Khuzestan	Pro League	2015–16	19	2	1	0	–	–	0	0	20	2
Esteghlal Khuzestan	Pro League	2016-17	26	5	3	0	7	0	1	0	37	5
Esteghlal Khuzestan	Total		45	7	4	0	7	0	1	0	57	7
Foolad	Persian Gulf Pro League	2017-18	26	4	1	0	–	–	0	0	27	4
Nassaji	Persian Gulf Pro League	2018-19	24	3	1	0	0	0	0	0	25	3
Nassaji	Persian Gulf Pro League	2019-20	27	2	0	0	0	0	0	0	27	2
Nassaji	Total		51	5	1	0	0	0	0	0	52	5
Gol Gohar	Persian Gulf Pro League	2020-21	29	1	4	1	0	0	0	0	33	2
Gol Gohar	Persian Gulf Pro League	2021-22	29	1	1	0	0	0	0	0	30	1
Gol Gohar	Persian Gulf Pro League	2022-23	28	4	3	0	0	0	0	0	31	4
Gol Gohar	Persian Gulf Pro League	2023-24	20	2	2	0	0	0	0	0	22	2
Gol Gohar	Total		106	8	10	1	0	0	0	0	116	9
Career totals			290	38	22	4	7	0	1	0	320	42

== Honours ==
=== Club ===
Foolad Novin

- Azadegan League (1): 2014–15

Esteghlal Khuzestan

- Iran Pro League (1): 2015–16
- Iranian Super Cup runner-up: 2016

=== Individual ===
- Football's 2nd Division Top Goalscorer: 2011–12
- Football's 3rd Division Top Goalscorer: 2009–10
