= Ali Akbar Ahaki =

Iranian football goalkeeper

Personal information
- Date of birth: 3 April 1993 (age 33)
- Place of birth: Ahvaz, Iran
- Height: 1.84 m (6 ft 0 in)
- Position: Goalkeeper

Youth career
- 2010–2013: Foolad

Senior career*
Years	Team	Apps	(Gls)
2013–2016	Esteghlal Khuzestan	1	(0)
2016–2018	Hafari Ahvaz		
2018–2019	CSKA Pamir Dushanbe		
2019–2020	Hafari Ahvaz		
2020–2022	Esteghlal Mollasani	22	(0)
- * Club domestic league appearances and goals

Ali Akbar Ahaki (born 3 April 1993) is an Iranian former football goalkeeper.

== Club career ==
=== Esteghlal Khuzestan ===
He made his debut for Esteghlal Khuzestan in the 20th fixture of 2013–14 Iran Pro League against Naft Tehran while he substituted in for Fábio Carvalho.

== Honours ==
Esteghlal Khuzestan

- Iran Pro League (1): 2015–16
- Iranian Super Cup runner-up: 2016
