= Parviz Karimi =

Iranian footballer

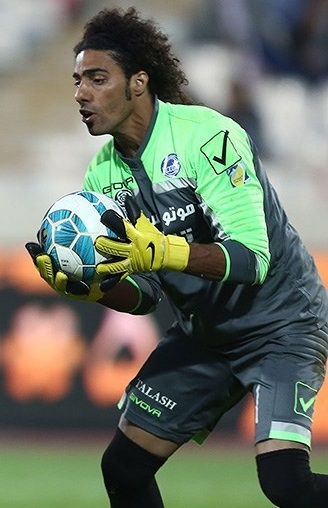

Personal information
- Full name: Parviz Karimi
- Date of birth: March 21, 1986 (age 40)
- Place of birth: Rudan, Iran
- Height: 1.85 m (6 ft 1 in)
- Position: Goalkeeper

Team information
- Current team: Gostaresh Foulad
- Number: 17

Youth career
- 1999–2001: Shahin Roudan
- 2001–2006: Shahid Ghandi Yazd

Senior career*
Years	Team	Apps	(Gls)
2004–2006	Shahid Ghandi Yazd		
2006–2013	Shahrdari Bandar Abbas		
2013–2015	Esteghlal Khuzestan	45	(0)
2015–2016	Esteghlal Ahvaz	13	(0)
2016	Aluminium Arak	28	(0)
2016–2017	Gol Gohar		
2017–2018	Machine Sazi		
2018–	Gostaresh Foulad		
- * Club domestic league appearances and goals as of 15 May 2015

Parviz Karimi (Persian: پرویز کریمی; born March 21, 1986) is an Iranian footballer who plays as a goalkeeper for Gostaresh Foulad in the Persian Gulf Pro League.

== Club career ==
=== Shahid Ghandi ===
He spent five years in Yazd and left Shahid Ghandi Yazd after relegation to Division 1.

=== Shahrdari Bandar Abbas ===
In the summer of 2006, he joined the newly established club, Shahrdari Bandar Abbas. In his seventh season in the club he turned to his first choice and made 23 appearances.

=== Esteghlal Khuzestan ===
After a great season with Shahrdari Bandar Abbas he joined Ahvazi side, Esteghlal Khuzestan with a two-year contract. After poor reviews from Fábio Carvalho he was chosen as first goalkeeper by Abdollah Veisi and made his debut for Esteghlal Khuzestan in the Ahvaz Derby against Foolad during the 2013–14 Iran Pro League.

After spells at Esteghlal Ahvaz, Aluminium Arak, Gol Gohar and Machine Sazi, Karimi joined Gostaresh Foulad in July 2018.

== Club career statistics ==
As of 19 August 2014.

Club	Division	Season	League		Hazfi Cup		Asia		Total	
Club	Division	Season	Apps	Goals	Apps	Goals	Apps	Goals	Apps	Goals
Shahrdari; Bandar Abbas	Division 1	2009–10	9	0	1	0	–	–	10	0
Shahrdari; Bandar Abbas	Division 1	2010–11	7	0	1	0	–	–	8	0
Shahrdari; Bandar Abbas	Division 1	2011–12	3	0	0	0	–	–	3	0
Shahrdari; Bandar Abbas	Division 1	2012–13	23	0	0	0	–	–	23	0
Esteghlal; Khuzestan	Pro League	2013–14	21	0	1	0	–	–	22	0
Esteghlal; Khuzestan	Pro League	2014–15	4	0	0	0	–	–	4	0
Career Totals			67	0	3	0	0	0	70	0
