= Mehdi Kheiri =

Iranian footballer

Personal information
- Full name: Mehdi Kheiri Mir
- Date of birth: 11 February 1983 (age 43)
- Place of birth: Babol, Iran
- Height: 1.74 m (5 ft 9 in)
- Position: Midfielder

Youth career
- 1999–2003: Shamoushak

Senior career*
Years	Team	Apps	(Gls)
2003–2004	Shamoushak	1	(0)
2004–2006	Aboomoslem	35	(5)
2006–2008	PAS Hamedan	14	(1)
2008–2009	Saba Qom	33	(4)
2009–2012	Saipa	90	(10)
2012–2013	Naft Tehran	24	(4)
2013–2014	Esteghlal Khuzestan	24	(3)
2014–2016	Padideh	50	(6)
2016–2018	Khoneh Be Khoneh	45	(4)
2018–2019	Aluminium Arak	2	(0)
2019–2020	Nirooye Zamini	1	(0)
- * Club domestic league appearances and goals

Mehdi Kheiri Mir (Persian: مهدی خیری میر; born 11 February 1983) is an Iranian former footballer.

== Club career ==
Kheiri joined Saipa in 2009.

=== Club career statistics ===
As of 8 August 2014

Club performance			League		Cup		Continental		Total	
Season	Club	League	Apps	Goals	Apps	Goals	Apps	Goals	Apps	Goals
Iran			League		Hazfi Cup		Asia		Total	
2004–05	Aboumoslem	Pro League	14	2			–	–		
2005–06	Aboumoslem	Pro League	22	3			–	–		
2006–07	Pas Hamedan	Pro League	8	4			–	–		
2007–08	Pas Hamedan	Pro League	16	7	1	0	–	–	11	0
2008–09	Saba Qom	Pro League	33	6	3	2	6	0	42	8
2009–10	Saipa	Pro League	34	8	1	0	–	–	35	8
2010–11	Saipa	Pro League	33	5	1	0	–	–	34	5
2011–12	Saipa	Pro League	24	6	0	0	–	–	24	6
2012–13	Naft Tehran	Pro League	24	7	1	0	–	–	25	7
2013–14	Esteghlal Khuzestan	Pro League	24	5	1	0	–	–	25	5
2014–15	Padideh	Pro League	13	0	0	0	–	–	6	0
Career total			220	28			0	0		

- Assist Goals

Season	Team	Assists
04–05	Aboomoslem	10
05–06	Aboomoslem	4
06–07	Pas Hamedan	3
07–08	Pas Hamedan	6
08–09	Saba Qom	7
09–10	Saipa	7
10–11	Saipa	9
11–12	Saipa	6
12–13	Naft Tehran	9
13–14	Esteghlal Khuzestan	4
14–15	Padideh	4
