= Fabio Carvalho =

Fabio Carvalho may refer to:

- Fábio Carvalho (footballer, born 1978), Brazilian football goalkeeper
- Fábio Carvalho (footballer, born 2002), Portuguese football winger
