= Ebrahim Salehi =

Iranian footballer

Personal information
- Date of birth: 12 October 1991 (age 35)
- Place of birth: Bushehr, Iran
- Height: 1.90 m (6 ft 3 in)
- Position: Forward

Team information
- Current team: Palayesh Naft
- Number: 9

Youth career
- –2012: Iranjavan U21

Senior career*
Years	Team	Apps	(Gls)
2011–2013	Iranjavan	23	(3)
2013–2017	Esteghlal Khuzestan	20	(4)
2015–2017	→ Fajr Sepasi (loan)	41	(10)
2017	Baadraan	10	(1)
2017–2019	Pars Jonoubi	55	(6)
2019–2024	Paykan	123	(10)
2024–	Palayesh Naft	14	(3)
- * Club domestic league appearances and goals as of 22 April 2025

Ebrahim Salehi (Persian: ابراهیم صالحی; born 12 October 1991) is an Iranian football forward who plays for Azadegan League club Palayesh Naft.

== Club career statistics ==
As of 1 June 2018.

Club	Division	Season	League		Hazfi Cup		Asia		Total	
Club	Division	Season	Apps	Goals	Apps	Goals	Apps	Goals	Apps	Goals
Iranjavan	Division 1	2012–13	23	3	0	0	–	–	23	3
Esteghlal Khuzestan	PGL	2013–14	18	4	0	0	–	–	18	4
Esteghlal Khuzestan	PGL	2014–15	2	0	0	0	–	–	2	0
Fajr Sepasi (loan)	Division 1	2015–16	30	8	0	0	–	–	30	8
Fajr Sepasi (loan)	Division 1	2016–17	11	2	0	0	–	–	11	2
Baadraan	Division 1	2016–17	10	1	0	0	–	–	10	1
Pars Jonoubi	PGL	2017–18	28	3	0	0	–	–	28	3
Pars Jonoubi	PGL	2018–19	0	0	0	0	–	–	0	0
Career totals			122	21	0	0	–	–	122	21
