= Ramin Khosravi =

Iranian footballer

Personal information
- Full name: Mohammad Ebrahim Khosravi
- Date of birth: 5 April 1984 (age 42)
- Place of birth: Karaj, Iran
- Height: 1.80 m (5 ft 11 in)
- Position: Defender

Senior career*
Years	Team	Apps	(Gls)
2009–2010	Sanati Kaveh		
2010–2011	PAS Hamedan	28	(0)
2011–2012	Malavan	14	(0)
2012–2013	Alvand Hamedan	29	(3)
2014–2015	Esteghlal Khuzestan	32	(3)
2016–2018	PAS Hamedan		
- * Club domestic league appearances and goals

Ramin Khosravi aka Mohammad Ebrahim Khosravi (Persian: محمد ابراهیم خسروی; born 5 April 1984) is an Iranian former football player.

== Career ==
Khosravi had been with Pas Hamedan from 2010 until 2011.

Club performance			League		Cup		Continental		Total	
Season	Club	League	Apps	Goals	Apps	Goals	Apps	Goals	Apps	Goals
Iran			League		Hazfi Cup		Asia		Total	
2010–11	Pas Hamedan	Pro League	28	0	1	0	–	–	29	0
2011–12	Malavan	Pro League	14	0	0	0	–	–	14	0
2012–13	Alvand Hamedan	Division 1	20	1	0	0	–	–	21	3
2013–14	Alvand Hamedan	Division 1	9	0	4	0	–	–	13	0
2013–14	Esteghlal Khuzestan	Pro League	13	0	0	0	–	–	13	2
2014–15	Esteghlal Khuzestan	Pro League	15	0	2	0	–	–	17	1
Career total			76	1	5	0	0	0	81	6

== External sources ==
- Profile at Persianleague
