= Mehdi Chahkoutahzadeh =

Iranian footballer

Personal information
- Date of birth: May 26, 1989 (age 37)
- Place of birth: Bushehr, Iran
- Position: Midfielder

Team information
- Current team: Fajr Sepasi
- Number: 10

Youth career
- 2007–2010: Iranjavan

Senior career*
Years	Team	Apps	(Gls)
2010–2013	Iranjavan	46	(10)
2013–2014	Esteghlal Khuzestan	8	(1)
2014–	Fajr Sepasi	16	(4)
- * Club domestic league appearances and goals as of 15 May 2015

Mehdi Chahkoutahzadeh (born May 26, 1989) is an Iranian footballer who plays for Fajr Sepasi in the Azadegan League.

== Club career ==
Heidari had played his entire career with Iranjavan, until he moved to Fajr Sepasi in the summer of 2014.
