= Mohammad Ousani =

Iranian footballer

Mohammad Osanikord
Personal information
- Full name: Mohammad OsaniKord
- Date of birth: September 11, 1992 (age 34)
- Place of birth: Andimeshk, Iran
- Height: 1.85 m (6 ft 1 in)
- Positions: Winger; striker

Team information
- Current team: Suphanburi
- Number: 9

Youth career
- 2012: Esteghlal Ahvaz
- 2012–2013: Foolad

Senior career*
Years	Team	Apps	(Gls)
2013	Shahrdari Dezful	5	(6)
2013–2014	Esteghlal Khuzestan	20	(7)
2015–2017	Saba Qom	20	(8)
2017	Gostaresh Foolad	6	(2)
2017–2018	Nassaji	12	(5)
2018-2019	Sorkh Poshan	5	(2)
2019-2020	Karun Arvand		
2020	Pars Jonoubi		
2025–	Suphanburi	15	(8)

International career
2015	Iran Universiade	10	(9)
- * Club domestic league appearances and goals

Mohammad Osanikord (Persian: محمد اوسانی) is an Iranian football winger who plays for Thai League 3 club Suphanburi.

== Club career ==
=== Esteghlal Khuzestan ===
He joined Esteghlal Khuzestan after shining in Hazfi Cup with Shahrdari Dezful. He made his debut for Esteghlal Khuzestan in 2013–14 Iran Pro League against Saipa as a starter. As of December 2014, he was released from Esteghlal Khuzestan.

=== Saba ===
Ousani joined Saba Qom on 28 December 2014 with an 18-month contract.

== Club career statistics ==
As of 15 May 2015.

Club	Division	Season	League		Hazfi Cup		Asia		Total	
Club	Division	Season	Apps	Goals	Apps	Goals	Apps	Goals	Apps	Goals
Esteghlal; Khuzestan	Pro League	2013–14	9	3	0	0	–	–	9	3
Esteghlal; Khuzestan	Pro League	2014–15	11	4	0	0	–	–	11	4
Saba Qom	Pro League	2014–15	20	8	1	0	–	–	21	8
Gostaresh Foulad F.C.	Pro League	2015-2016	6	2	0	0	–	–	6	2
F.C. Nassaji Mazandaran	Pro League	2016	12	5	1	1	–	–	13	6
Total	Pro League	2013-2016	58	22	2	1	–	–	60	23
