= Karim Boostani =

Iranian goalkeeper and football coach

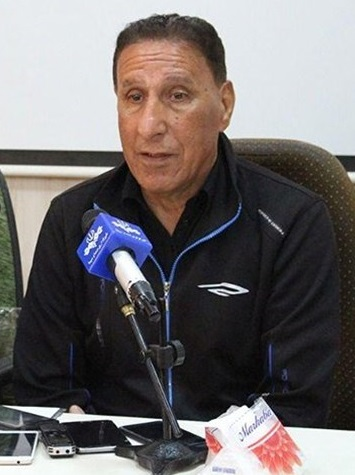

Personal information
- Full name: Karim Boostani
- Date of birth: 21 March 1952 (age 74)
- Place of birth: Masjed Soleyman, Iran
- Height: 1.87 m (6 ft 2 in)
- Position: Goalkeeper

Senior career*
Years	Team	Apps	(Gls)
- Taj Masjed Soleyman
- Niroye Ahvaz

International career
1978–1980	Iran	3	(0)

Managerial career
- 2002–2003: Esteghlal Ahvaz (assistant)
- 2005–2006: Esteghlal Kish
- 2009–2010: Sepahan (goalkeeping coach)
- 2011–2012: Tractor Sazi (goalkeeping coach)
- 2012–2015: Esteghlal (assistant)
- 2015–2016: Saba Qom (goalkeeping coach)
- 2018: Esteghlal Khuzestan (assistant)
- 2018–2019: Esteghlal Khuzestan (interim)
- * Club domestic league appearances and goals

Karim Boostani (Persian: کریم بوستانی; born 21 March 1952) is an Iranian football coach and former goalkeeper. He was the goalkeeping coach of Esteghlal, Sepahan, Saba Qom and Tractor Sazi.
