= Ali Bigdeli =

Iranian football player

Personal information
- Full name: Ali Bigdeli
- Date of birth: January 21, 1987 (age 39)
- Place of birth: Iran
- Position: Midfielder

Team information
- Current team: Esteghlal Ahvaz

Senior career*
Years	Team	Apps	(Gls)
2013–2014	Esteghlal Khuzestan	12	(1)
2014–2015	Iranjavan	16	(3)
2015–	Esteghlal Ahvaz	8	(0)
- * Club domestic league appearances and goals

Ali Bigdeli (born January 21, 1987) is an Iranian football player, who currently plays for Esteghlal Ahvaz of the Persian Gulf Pro League.
