= Idrissa Traoré (footballer, born 1990) =

Malian footballer

Idrissa Traore
Personal information
- Full name: Idrissa Nama Laïco Traore
- Date of birth: 17 July 1990 (age 36)
- Place of birth: Mali
- Position: Midfielder

Team information
- Current team: Djoliba AC

Senior career*
Years	Team	Apps	(Gls)
2007–2010	CSK		
2010–	Djoliba AC		
2013–2014	→ Esteghlal Khuzestan (loan)	25	(0)

International career
2009–2014	Mali	5	(3)
- * Club domestic league appearances and goals

Idrissa Nama Laïco Traore is a Malian footballer, who is currently playing for Djoliba AC, which represented as Captain.

== Career ==
He started his senior career in the spring of 2007 with Centre Salif Keita. He played for the club until the summer of 2010 and then signed for Djoliba AC. In the summer of 2013 Traore joined Esteghlal Khuzestan F.C. in the Iran Pro League, on loan. He made 25 appearances during the 2013–2014 season and was one of Esteghlal Khuzestan's most solid players.

=== International ===
Traoré is also since 2009 member of the Mali national football team and scored three goals in five games.

== Career statistics ==
=== International ===
Appearances and goals by national team and year
National team	Year	Apps	Goals
Mali	2009	1	1
Mali	2010	–	
Mali	2011	–	
Mali	2012	1	0
Mali	2013	1	1
Mali	2014	2	1
Total		5	3

Scores and results list Mali's goal tally first, score column indicates score after each Traoré goal.

List of international goals scored by Idrissa Traoré
No.	Date	Venue	Opponent	Score	Result	Competition
1	25 April 2009	Stade Modibo Kéïta, Bamako, Mali	Equatorial Guinea	2–0	3–0	Friendly
2	6 July 2013	Stade Modibo Kéïta, Bamako, Mali	Guinea	3–1	3–1	2014 African Nations Championship qualification
3	19 January 2014	Athlone Stadium, Cape Town, South Africa	Mozambique	2–1	2–1	2014 African Nations Championship
