= Behrouz Makvandi =

Iranian footballer and manager

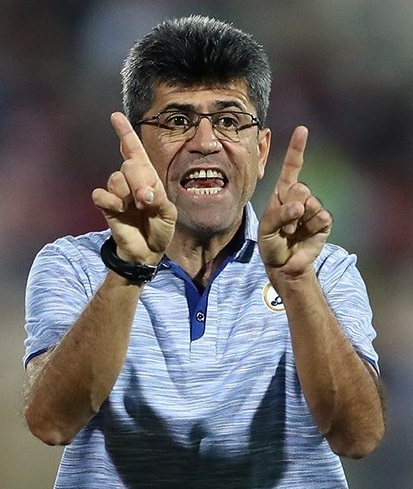

Personal information
- Full name: Behrouz Makvandi
- Date of birth: 23 August 1963 (age 63)
- Place of birth: Masjed Soleyman, Iran
- Height: 1.80 m (5 ft 11 in)
- Position: Right back

Team information
- Current team: Naft Masjed Soleyman (assistant manager)

Youth career
- 1990–1994: Sanat Naft

Senior career*
Years	Team	Apps	(Gls)
1993–2003	Sanat Naft		
2003–2005	Naft Masjed Soleyman		

Managerial career
- 2008–2010: Naft Masjed Soleyman (assistant)
- 2010–2015: Naft Masjed Soleyman
- 2017–2018: Esteghlal Khuzestan (assistant)
- 2018–: Naft Masjed Soleyman (assistant)
- * Club domestic league appearances and goals

Behrouz Makvandi (Persian: بهروز مکوندی, born 23 August 1963) is an Iranian retired football player and manager.

== Honours ==
Naft Masjed Soleyman

- Azadegan League (1): 2013–14 (Runner-up)
