= Farzad Jafari =

Iranian Football Defender (born 1993)

Personal information
- Date of birth: 25 March 1993 (age 33)
- Place of birth: Dezful, Iran
- Height: 1.85 m (6 ft 1 in)
- Position: Right back

Team information
- Current team: Esteghlal Khuzestan
- Number: 75

Youth career
- 2008–2012: Esteghlal Ahvaz

Senior career*
Years	Team	Apps	(Gls)
2012–2013	Esteghlal Ahvaz	18	(1)
2013–2017	Esteghlal Khuzestan	15	(0)
2015–2017	→ Malavan (loan)	17	(0)
2017–2021	Foolad	65	(1)
2021	Saipa	9	(0)
2021–2022	Sanat Naft	4	(0)
2022–2023	Havadar	22	(3)
2023	Mes Kerman	11	(0)
2024–2025	Mes Kerman	19	(0)
2025–2026	Shahrdari Nowshar	11	(0)
2026	Saipa	14	(1)
2026–	Esteghlal Khuzestan	9	(0)
- * Club domestic league appearances and goals as of 22 April 2025

Farzad Jafari (Persian: فرزاد جعفری; born 25 March 1993) is an Iranian football player who plays for Esteghlal Khuzestan in the Persian Gulf Pro League.

== Club career ==
Jafari started his career with Esteghlal Ahvaz at the youth level. He was promoted to Division 1 in 2012. He was a regular starter in his first season with Esteghlal Ahvaz. In winter 2013, he joined Esteghlal Khuzestan with a 3 1/2 year contract. He made his debut for Esteghlal Khuzestan on 19 December 2013 against Malavan as a starter.

== Club career statistics ==
As of 31 October 2014.

Club	Division	Season	League		Hazfi Cup		Asia		Total	
Club	Division	Season	Apps	Goals	Apps	Goals	Apps	Goals	Apps	Goals
Esteghlal; Ahvaz	Division 1	2012–13	22	0	1	0	–	–	23	1
Esteghlal; Ahvaz	Division 1	2013–14	3	1	0	0	–	–	3	1
Esteghlal; Khuzestan	Pro League	2013–14	4	0	0	0	–	–	4	0
Esteghlal; Khuzestan	Pro League	2014–15	3	0	1	0	–	–	4	0
Career totals			32	1	2	0	0	0	34	1
