= Saeid Chahjouei =

Iranian football player

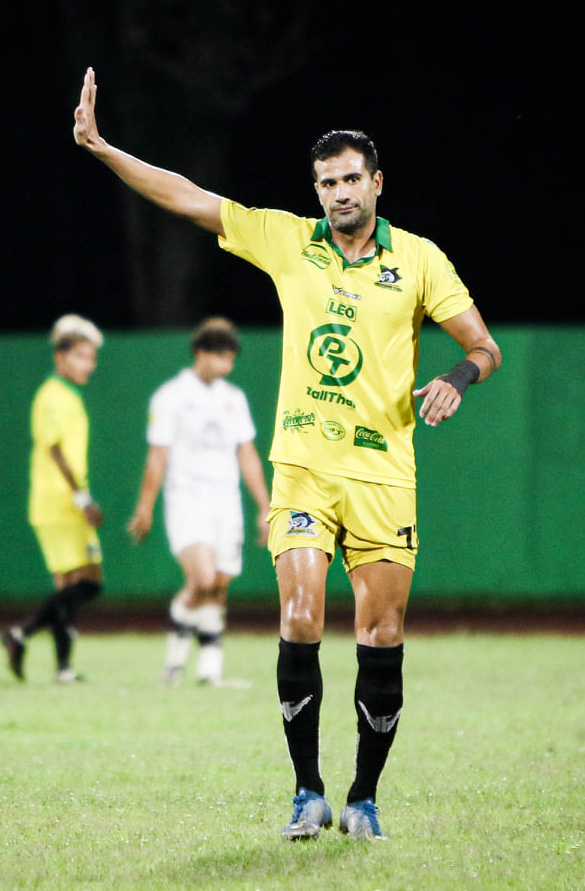
- Saeid Chahjouei playing for Ranong United.

Personal information
- Full name: Saeid Chahjouei
- Date of birth: 22 June 1986 (age 40)
- Place of birth: Mashhad, Iran
- Position: Defender

Team information
- Current team: Kanjanapat
- Number: 7

Senior career*
Years	Team	Apps	(Gls)
2005–2007	Esteghlal Ahvaz	4	(0)
2007–2009	Aboumoslem	41	(0)
2009–2010	Moghavemat Sepasi	19	(1)
2010–2011	Aboumoslem	20	(0)
2011–2012	Rah Ahan	8	(0)
2012–2013	Shahrdari Bandar Abbas	17	(0)
2013–2014	Esteghlal Khuzestan	4	(0)
2014–2015	Esteghlal Ahvaz		
2018–2019	Nakhon Pathom United	27	(2)
2020–2021	Phitsanulok	20	(0)
2021–2022	Ranong United	25	(0)
2023–	Kanjanapat	9	(0)

International career
2006–2007	Iran U23	2	(0)
Medal record
Representing Iran
Men's Football
Asian Games
Bronze medal – third place	2006 Qatar	Team competition
- * Club domestic league appearances and goals as of 19 March 2023 (UTC)

Saeid Chahjouei (Persian: سعید چاه‌جویی‌; born 22 June 1986) is an Iranian football player, currently playing for Kanjanapat in the Thai League 3. He is a bronze medalist of 2006 Asian Games with Iran national under-23 football team.

== Club career ==
=== Statistics ===
Club performance			League		Cup		Continental		Total	
Season	Club	League	Apps	Goals	Apps	Goals	Apps	Goals	Apps	Goals
Iran			League		Hazfi Cup		Asia		Total	
2005–06	Esteghlal Ahvaz	Pro League	1	0			-	-		
2006–07	Esteghlal Ahvaz	Pro League	3	0			-	-		
2007–08	Aboumoslem	Pro League	30	0			-	-		
2008–09	Aboumoslem	Pro League	11	0			-	-		
2009–10	Moghavemat Sepasi	Pro League	19	1			-	-		
2010–11	Aboumoslem	Division 1	20	0			-	-		
2011–12	Rah Ahan	Pro League	8	0	0	0	-	-	8	0
Career total			92	1			0	0		
