= Hadi Khanifar =

Iranian footballer

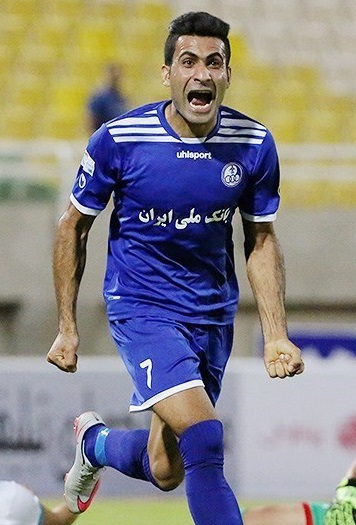

Personal information
- Full name: Abdolhadi Khanifar
- Date of birth: December 22, 1983 (age 42)
- Place of birth: Shoush, Iran
- Position: Midfielder

Team information
- Current team: Naft va Gaz Gachsaran

Youth career
- –2006: Foolad

Senior career*
Years	Team	Apps	(Gls)
2006–2007	Foolad	20	(4)
2007–2008	Shahin Bushehr	21	(2)
2008–2011	Esteghlal Ahvaz	53	(13)
2011–2016	Esteghlal Khuzestan	82	(9)
2012	→ Mes Sarcheshmeh (loan)	10	(2)
- * Club domestic league appearances and goals as of 16 May 2016

Hadi Khanifar (Persian: هادی خنیفر) is an Iranian football midfielder who currently plays for Iranian football club Esteghlal Khuzestan in the Iran Pro League.

== Club career ==
Khanifar was introduced to Iranian football by Foolad in 2006. He also had experiences with Shahin Bushehr, Mes Sarcheshmeh, Esteghlal Ahvaz and Esteghlal Khuzestan. He helped Esteghlal Khuzestan in promoting to top flight of Iranian football in 2013. As Summer 2014 he was named club captain.

== Club career statistics ==
As of 31 October 2014

Club	Division	Season	League		Hazfi Cup		Total	
Club	Division	Season	Apps	Goals	Apps	Goals	Apps	Goals
Esteghlal; Ahvaz	Pro League	2008–09	9	3				
Esteghlal; Ahvaz	Pro League	2009–10	26	0				
Esteghlal; Ahvaz	Division 1	2010–11	19	3				
Esteghlal Kh.	Division 1	2011–12	15	7			15	7
Mes SRC	Division 1	2012–13	10	2	–	–	10	2
Esteghlal; Khuzestan	Division 1	2012–13	11	1	–	–	11	1
Esteghlal; Khuzestan	Pro League	2013–14	26	0	1	0	27	0
Esteghlal; Khuzestan	Pro League	2014–15	23	0	1	0	24	0
Career Totals			139	17				

== Honours ==
Esteghlal Khuzestan

- Iran Pro League (1): 2015–16
- Iranian Super Cup runner-up: 2016
