= Saeid Salarzadeh =

Iranian footballer (born 1983)

Saeed Salarzadeh
Personal information
- Date of birth: 13 February 1983 (age 43)
- Place of birth: Bandar Anzali, Iran
- Height: 1.83 m (6 ft 0 in)
- Position: Centre-back

Youth career
- 2000–2005: Malavan

Senior career*
Years	Team	Apps	(Gls)
2005–2013	Malavan	193	(0)
2013–2014	Foolad	2	(0)
2014–2015	Naft Masjed Soleyman	26	(1)
2015	Esteghlal Ahvaz	9	(1)
2016–2017	Rayong		
2017–2019	Malavan	19	(0)
- * Club domestic league appearances and goals

Saeed Salarzadeh (Persian: سعید سالارزاده; born 13 February 1983) is an Iranian former footballer.

== Club career ==
=== Malavan ===
Salarzadeh had been with Malavan from 2005 to 2013.

=== Foolad ===
Salarzadeh joined Foolad for the 2013–14 season.

== Club career statistics ==
As of 14 June 2019

Club performance			League		Cup		Continental		Other		Total	
Season	Club	League	Apps	Goals	Apps	Goals	Apps	Goals	Apps	Goals	Apps	Goals
2005–06	Malavan	Persian Gulf Pro League	10	0			—		—			
2006–07	Malavan	Persian Gulf Pro League	21	0			—		—			
2007–08	Malavan	Persian Gulf Pro League	18	0	1	0	—		—		19	0
2008–09	Malavan	Persian Gulf Pro League	27	0	1	0	—		—		28	0
2009–10	Malavan	Persian Gulf Pro League	32	0	2	0	—		—		34	0
2010–11	Malavan	Persian Gulf Pro League	26	0	5	0	—		—		31	0
2011–12	Malavan	Persian Gulf Pro League	30	0			—		—			
2012–13	Malavan	Persian Gulf Pro League	21	0			—		—			
2013–14	Malavan	Persian Gulf Pro League	8	0			—		—			
Total			193	0			—		—			
2013–14	Foolad	Persian Gulf Pro League	2	0			2	0	—			
2014–15	Naft Masjed Soleyman	Persian Gulf Pro League	26	1			—		—			
2015–16	Esteghlal Ahvaz	Persian Gulf Pro League	9	1	1	0	—		—		10	1
2016	Rayong	Thai League 2					—					
2017	Rayong	Thai League 2			1	0	—		1	0		
Total							—					
2017–18	Malavan	Azadegan League	11	0			—		—			
2018–19	Malavan	Azadegan League	8	0	1	0	—		—		9	0
Total			19	0			—		—			
Career total							2	0				

- Assist Goals

Season	Team	Assists
10–11	Malavan	1
11–12	Malavan	0

== Honours ==
Foolad

- Iran Pro League (1): 2013–14
