= Hadi Ta'mini =

Iranian footballer

Personal information
- Full name: Hadi Ta'mini
- Date of birth: 23 August 1981 (age 45)
- Place of birth: Rasht, Iran
- Height: 1.91 m (6 ft 3 in)
- Position: Defender

Team information
- Current team: Sepidrood
- Number: 6

Youth career
- 1999–2004: Malavan

Senior career*
Years	Team	Apps	(Gls)
2004–2011	Malavan	176	(6)
2011–2013	Sepahan	27	(2)
2013	Malavan	11	(0)
2013–2014	Zob Ahan	14	(0)
2014	Mes Kerman	12	(2)
2015–	Sepidrood	38	(2)
- * Club domestic league appearances and goals as of 24 August 2015

Hadi Ta'mini (Persian: هادی تامینی, born August 23, 1981) is an Iranian footballer who currently plays for Sepidrood in Persian Gulf Pro League. He spend his golden years with Malavan.

== Club career ==
=== Club career statistics ===
- Last Update: 24 August 2015

Club performance			League		Cup		Continental		Total	
Season	Club	League	Apps	Goals	Apps	Goals	Apps	Goals	Apps	Goals
Iran			League		Hazfi Cup		Asia		Total	
2004–05	Malavan	Pro League	17	0			–	–		
2005–06	Malavan	Pro League	25	2			–	–		
2006–07	Malavan	Pro League	23	0			–	–		
2007–08	Malavan	Pro League	32	3	1	0	–	–	33	3
2008–09	Malavan	Pro League	29	1	1	0	–	–	30	1
2009–10	Malavan	Pro League	27	0	2	1	–	–	29	1
2010–11	Malavan	Pro League	23	0			–	–		
2011–12	Sepahan	Pro League	17	0	0	0	3	0	20	0
2012–13	Sepahan	Pro League	10	2	0	0	0	0	10	2
2012–13	Malavan	Pro League	11	0	1	0	–	–	12	0
2013–14	Zob Ahan	Pro League	14	0	0	0	–	–	14	0
2013–14	Mes Kerman	Pro League	12	2	0	0	–	–	12	2
2015–16	Sepidrood	2nd Division	2	1	0	0	–	–	2	1
Career total			212	9			3	0		

== Honours ==
- Iran's Premier Football League
  - Winner: 1
    - 2011–12 with Sepahan
- Hazfi Cup
  - Runner-up: 1
    - 2013–14 with Mes Kerman
