= Hamed Mahmoudi =

Iranian footballer

Personal information
- Date of birth: December 7, 1987 (age 38)
- Place of birth: Babol, Iran
- Position: Full back

Team information
- Current team: Shahin Bushehr

Senior career*
Years	Team	Apps	(Gls)
2011–2014	Esteghlal Khuzestan	29	(0)
2013–2014	→ Shahrdari Yasuj (loan)	10	(2)
2014–2016	Naft Masjed Soleyman	18	(2)
2016	Mes Rafsanjan	13	(0)
2016–2017	Mes Kerman	19	(1)
2017–2018	Mes Rafsanjan	18	(2)
2018–2019	Mes Kerman	8	(2)
2019	Sepidrood Rasht	0	(0)
2020	Shahin Bushehr		
- * Club domestic league appearances and goals

Hamed Mahmoudi is a professional footballer who plays as a defender. He started his career with Esteghlal Khuzestan in Azadegan League.

== Esteghlal Khuzestan ==
Hamed played his very first game against his future team Shahrdari Yasuj in Azadegan League. Hamed promoted with his team to Persian Gulf Pro League, but soon after he went to a loan deal with Shahrdari Yasuj.

== Naft Masjed Soleyman ==
Hamed was on the 2014 transfer deal for Naft Masjed Soleyman. His first match was against Peykan with a 0–0 draw. He also got the first 3 points for the club in the league against the defending champions Foolad.

== Honours ==
Esteghlal Khuzestan

- Azadegan League (1): 2012-13 (Runners Up)
