= Mojtaba Rashidi =

Iranian footballer

Personal information
- Date of birth: 24 December 1996 (age 29)
- Place of birth: Shoushtar, Iran
- Height: 1.86 m (6 ft 1 in)
- Position: Left back

Youth career
- –2015: Esteghlal Ahvaz

Senior career*
Years	Team	Apps	(Gls)
2016–2017	Esteghlal Ahvaz	4	(0)
2017	Petrokian Shushtar		
2017–2018	Sanat Naft	1	(0)
2019	Alwusta	14	(3)
2019–2020	Majees	4	(1)
2022	Ararat		
2022	Biss Buru		
- * Club domestic league appearances and goals

Mojtaba Rashidi (Persian: مجتبی رشیدی; born 24 December 1996) is an Iranian former football defender.
