= Mahmoud Tighnavard =

Iranian footballer

Personal information
- Date of birth: September 7, 1983 (age 43)
- Place of birth: Tehran, Iran
- Position: Midfielder

Team information
- Current team: Baadraan Tehran
- Number: 10

Senior career*
Years	Team	Apps	(Gls)
2009–2011	Iranjavan	19	(0)
2011–2013	Aluminum Hormozgan	29	(1)
2013	Mes Kerman	13	(0)
2013–2014	Esteghlal Khuzestan	12	(1)
2014–2015	Naft Masjed Soleyman	15	(0)
2015–2016	Sanat Naft		
2016–	Baderan Tehran	0	(0)
- * Club domestic league appearances and goals

Mahmoud Tighnavard is a defensive midfielder, he started his career with Iranjavan he currently plays for Baadraan Tehran. The newly promoted team has high expectations, Mahmoud was one of the players that was in a transfer deal in Azadegan League.

== Mes Kerman ==
Mahmoud Tighnavard was used for Mes Kerman in 2013–2014 season in Iran Pro League. He played 13 games with 5 losses and 8 draws which was not good, Mes Kerman relegated the league.

== Naft Masjed Soleyman ==
He got transferred to Naft in 2014. He played his first game against Rah Ahan with a 2–2 draw.

== Honours ==
Iranjavan

- Azadegan League (1): 2011–12 (Runners Up)
