= Fábio Carvalho (footballer, born 1978) =

Brazilian-Portuguese footballer

Personal information
- Full name: Fábio Carvalho dos Santos
- Date of birth: April 26, 1978 (age 48)
- Place of birth: Rio de Janeiro, Brazil
- Height: 1.88 m (6 ft 2 in)
- Position: Goalkeeper

Youth career
- 1997–1998: America

Senior career*
| Years | Team | Apps | (Gls) |
| 1998–2003 | America | | (0) |
| 2001–2002 | → Sport Recife (loan) | | (0) |
| 2004 | CE Mataró | | (0) |
| 2004–2005 | Portuguesa Santista | | (0) |
| 2005 | Tires | | (0) |
| 2005–2006 | GD Estoril-Praia | | (1) |
| 2006–2008 | Zob Ahan | | (0) |
| 2008–2009 | Aluminium Arak | 22 | (0) |
| 2009–2011 | Mes Rafsanjan | | (0) |
| 2011–2012 | Iranjavan | 30 | (0) |
| 2012–2013 | Paykan | 29 | (0) |
| 2013–2014 | Esteghlal Khuzestan | 8 | (0) |
| 2015 | Colegiales | 6 | (0) |
| 2016 | Sarmiento | 10 | |
| 2017–2018 | Vila | 15 | |
| 2018–2019 | Folgosa da Maia | | |
| 2020–2021 | SC Canidelo | | |
- * Club domestic league appearances and goals

Fábio Carvalho dos Santos (Persian: فابیو کاروالیو; born April 26, 1978) is a Brazilian–Portuguese former football goalkeeper. He also played in Argentina for Colegiales and Sarmiento. Later he went back to Portugal to finish his career and helped Vila F.C. to reach the Elite League in Porto.

== Club career ==
After years in his home country, a move to Iran changed his career. In Iran, Carvalho known as Fabio, became a favorite among the Zob Ahan fans. After stiff competition from African counterpart Issa N'Doye. In 2006 Carvalho signed a 2-year contract with Iran's Premier Football League team F.C. Zob Ahan from his previous club GD Estoril-Praia. For the 2008/2009 season he signed a 2-year contract with Aluminium Arak F.C. Carvalho joined Mes Rafsanjan F.C. towards the end of the end season.

== Personal life ==
He became interested in Iranian culture after visiting Iran. He then married an Iranian woman, Simin Jafari, whom he met while playing for Zob Ahan Club in Isfahan. They have a daughter, Isabella Jafari Carvalho.
