= Alvand Hamedan F.C. =

Iranian football club

Alvand Hamedan
- Full name: Alvand Hamedan Football Club
- Nickname: New Pas (Pas Novin)
- Founded: 1972; 45 years ago
- Ground: Qods Stadium, Hamedan
- Capacity: 8,000
- Chairman: Ebrahim Mahmoudi
- Head Coach: Abdolrahim Kharazmi
- League: 2nd Division
- 2013–14: Azadegan League Group A, 12th (Relegated)
Home colours	Away colours

Alvand Hamedan Football Club (Former name Pas Novin Hamedan F.C.) is an Iranian football club based in Hamedan, Iran. After getting promoted to the Azadegan League, the team changed its name to Alvand Hamedan. In 2014 Alvand were relegated to the 2nd Division, after finishing 12th in the Azadegan League Group A.

== History ==
Alvand Hamedan Sports Club was founded in 1970, but after a few years the club disappeared. In 2000 Shahrdari Hamedan Athletic and Cultural Club was established. After ten years the club was dissolved and its licence in the 2nd Division was sold to Pas Novin, the reserve team of Pas Hamedan. After the team's name was changed to Alvand Hamedan, the team was allowed to participate in the Azadegan League. In 2014 Alvand was relegated back to the 2nd Division.

== Season-by-season ==
The table below shows the achievements of the club in various competitions.

Season	League	Position	Hazfi Cup	Notes
2010–11	2nd Division	8th/Group B	Did not qualify
2011–12	2nd Division	1st/Group B	Second round	Promoted
2012–13	Azadegan League	4th/Group A	Did not qualify
2013–14	Azadegan League	12th/Group A	Round of 16	Relegated

== See also ==
- 2012–13 Azadegan League
- 2011–12 Iran Football's 2nd Division
