= 2013–14 Persian Gulf Cup =

13rd season of Persian Gulf Pro League

Persian Gulf Cup
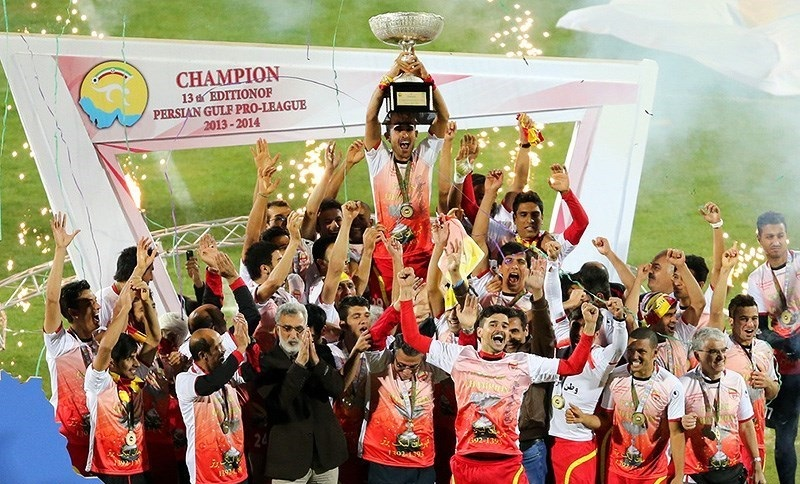
- Season: 2013–14
- Champions: Foolad; 2nd Pro League title 2nd Iranian title
- Relegated: Fajr Sepasi; Damash; Mes Kerman
- Champions League: Foolad; Persepolis; Naft Tehran; Tractor Sazi (Hazfi Cup champions)
- Matches: 240
- Goals: 504 (2.1 per match)
- Top goalscorer: Karim Ansarifard (14 goals)
- Best goalkeeper: Nilson Corrêa Júnior (18 clean sheets)
- Biggest home win: Gostaresh 5–0 Rah Ahan (11 January 2014)
- Biggest away win: Mes Kerman 0–6 Persepolis (13 December 2013)
- Highest scoring: Fajr Sepasi 2–4 Esteghlal (6 August 2013); Zob Ahan 2–4 Tractor Sazi (6 August 2013); Esteghlal Khuzestan 2–4 Naft Tehran (16 August 2013); Damash 5–1 Zob Ahan (24 October 2013); Mes Kerman 0–6 Persepolis (13 December 2013); Saipa 3–3 Tractor Sazi (11 January 2014); Malavan 4–2 Esteghlal (19 February 2014)
- Longest winning run: 5 matches Esteghlal; Foolad; Malavan
- Longest unbeaten run: 17 matches Esteghlal
- Longest winless run: 15 matches Mes Kerman
- Longest losing run: 6 matches Damash
- Highest attendance: 100,000; Esteghlal – Persepolis (6 September 2013)
- Lowest attendance: 0 (spectator ban); Sepahan – Foolad (25 July 2013); Rah Ahan – Saipa (5 December 2013); Foolad – Saba Qom (13 December 2013)
- Total attendance: 1,815,825
- Average attendance: 7,631

The 2013–14 Persian Gulf Cup (also known as Iran Pro League) was the 31st season of Iran's Football League and 13th as Iran Pro League since its establishment in 2001. Esteghlal were the defending champions. The season featured 14 teams from the 2012–13 Persian Gulf Cup and two new teams promoted from the 2012–13 Azadegan League: Esteghlal Khuzestan and Gostaresh both as champions. The league started on 24 July 2013 and ended on 11 April 2014. Foolad won the Pro League title for the second time in their history (total second Iranian title). Tractor Sazi's Karim Ansarifard's was the top scorer with 14 goals.

== Changes ==
=== Number of the teams ===
2013–14 Iran Pro League were the first season since 2006 that 16 teams participated in the competition. In the previous season, 18 teams participated in the league.

=== Rules and regulations ===
The Iranian football clubs who participate in 2013–14 Iran Pro League were allowed to have up to maximum 38 players (including up to maximum 4 non-Iranian players) in their player lists, which will be categorized in the following groups:

- Up to maximum 21 adult (without any age limit) players
- Up to maximum 9 under-23 players (i.e. the player whose birth is after 21 March 1990).
- Up to maximum 5 under-21 players (i.e. the player whose birth is after 1 January 1993).
- Up to maximum 3 under-19 players (i.e. the player whose birth is after 1 January 1995).

== Teams ==
=== Stadia and locations ===
Locations of clubs in 2013–14 Iran Pro League

Team	City	Venue	Capacity
Damash Gilan	Rasht	Dr. Azodi	11,000
Esteghlal	Tehran	Azadi	84,412
Esteghlal Khuzestan	Ahvaz	Ghadir; Takhti Ahvaz	38,900; 15,000
Fajr Sepasi	Shiraz	Hafezieh	14,000
Foolad Khuzestan	Ahvaz	Ghadir	38,900
Gostaresh	Tabriz	Sahand; Gostaresh Foolad	66,833; 12,000
Malavan	Anzali	Takhti Anzali	8,000
Mes Kerman	Kerman	Shahid Bahonar	15,430
Naft Tehran	Tehran	Takhti Tehran; Dastgerdi	30,122; 8,250
Persepolis	Tehran	Azadi	84,412
Rah Ahan	Tehran	Takhti Tehran; Rah Ahan	30,122; 12,000
Saba Qom	Qom	Yadegar Emam	10,610
Saipa	Karaj	Enghelab Karaj	15,000
Sepahan	Esfahan	Foolad Shahr	15,000
Tractor Sazi	Tabriz	Sahand	66,833
Zob Ahan	Esfahan	Foolad Shahr	15,000

=== Personnel and kits ===
Note: Flags indicate national team as has been defined under FIFA eligibility rules. Players may hold more than one non-FIFA nationality.

Team	Manager	Captain	Kit manufacturer	Shirt sponsor
Damash	(Iran) Ali Nazarmohammadi (caretaker)	(Iran) Reza Mahdavi	(Germany) Uhlsport	Loushan
Esteghlal	(Iran) Amir Ghalenoei	(Iran) Mehdi Rahmati	(Iran) Merooj	Bazar Mobl Iran, Mahan Air
Est. Khuzestan	(Iran) Abdollah Veisi	(Iran) Sohrab Bakhtiarizadeh	(Iran) Daei	INSIG
Fajr	(Iran) Mahmoud Yavari	(Iran) Mehrdad Karimian	(Iran) Merooj	HICE
Foolad	(Iran) Hossein Faraki	(Iran) Bakhtiar Rahmani	(Germany) Uhlsport	Foolad Khuzestan
Gostaresh	(Iran) Mehdi Tartar	(Iran) Meysam Naghizadeh	(Germany) Uhlsport	Ata Airlines
Malavan	(Croatia) Dragan Skočić	(Iran) Maziar Zare	(Germany) Uhlsport	Steel Azin Iranian
Mes Kerman	(Croatia) Luka Bonačić	(Iran) Farzad Hosseinkhani	(Germany) Uhlsport	Resalat Bank
Naft Tehran	(Iran) Yahya Golmohammadi	(Iran) Alireza Ezzati	(Iran) Merooj	NIOC
Persepolis	(Iran) Ali Daei	(Iran) Mohammad Nouri	(Germany) Uhlsport	Tourism Bank
Rah Ahan	(Iran) Mansour Ebrahimzadeh	(Iran) Bahador Abdi	(Iran) Daei	Fars Air Qeshm
Saba Qom	(Iran) Samad Marfavi	(Iran) Morteza Kashi	(Iran) Merooj	Hi clean!
Saipa	(Germany) Engin Firat	(Iran) Ebrahim Sadeghi	(Germany) Uhlsport	SAIPA
Sepahan	(Croatia) Zlatko Kranjčar	(Iran) Hadi Aghily	(Germany) Uhlsport	Foolad Mobarakeh
Tractor Sazi	(Portugal) Toni	(Iran) Morteza Assadi	(Iran) Merooj	Hamrah-e Aval
Zob Ahan	(Iran) Firouz Karimi	(Iran) Mehdi Rajabzadeh	(Iran) Merooj	Esfahan Steel

== Managerial changes ==
=== Before the start of the season ===
Team	Outgoing head coach	Manner of departure	Date of vacancy	Position in table	Incoming head coach	Date of appointment
Persepolis	(Iran) Yahya Golmohammadi	End of caretaker spell	11 May 2013	Pre-season	(Iran) Ali Daei	1 June 2013
Saipa	(Iran) Mojtaba Taghavi	End of contract	11 May 2013	Pre-season	(Germany) Engin Firat	1 June 2013
Malavan	(Iran) Mohammad Ahmadzadeh	Sacked	26 May 2013	Pre-season	(Croatia) Dragan Skočić	1 June 2013
Naft Tehran	(Iran) Mansour Ebrahimzadeh	Mutual consent	31 May 2013	Pre-season	(Iran) Yahya Golmohammadi	1 June 2013
Rah Ahan	(Iran) Ali Daei	Signed by Persepolis	31 May 2013	Pre-season	(Iran) Mansour Ebrahimzadeh	1 June 2013
Fajr Sepasi	(Iran) Mahmoud Yavari	Resigned	31 May 2013	Pre-season	(Iran) Gholam Peyrovani	1 June 2013
Saba Qom	(Iran) Samad Marfavi	End of contract	31 May 2013	Pre-season	(Iran) Mohammad Mayeli Kohan	1 June 2013
Mes Kerman	(Croatia) Luka Bonačić	Sacked	2 June 2013	Pre-season	(Iran) Mahmoud Yavari	25 July 2013
Zob Ahan	(Iran) Farhad Kazemi	End of contract	25 June 2013	Pre-season	(Croatia) Luka Bonačić	30 June 2013

=== During the season ===
Team	Outgoing head coach	Manner of departure	Date of vacancy	Position in table	Incoming head coach	Date of appointment
Fajr Sepasi	(Iran) Gholam Peyrovani	Resigned	7 September 2013	15th	(Iran) Mahmoud Yavari	15 September 2013
Mes Kerman	(Iran) Mahmoud Yavari	Resigned	14 September 2013	16th	(Iran) Parviz Mazloomi	18 September 2013
Saba Qom	(Iran) Mohammad Mayeli Kohan	Sacked	11 November 2013	12th	(Iran) Samad Marfavi	11 November 2013
Zob Ahan	(Croatia) Luka Bonačić	Mutual consent	1 January 2014	14th	(Iran) Mojtaba Taghavi	1 January 2014
Gostaresh	(Iran) Rasoul Khatibi	Resigned	1 January 2014	11th	(Iran) Mehdi Tartar	1 January 2014
Tractor Sazi	(Iran) Majid Jalali	Sacked	19 January 2014	6th	(Portugal) Toni	28 January 2014
Mes Kerman	(Iran) Parviz Mazloomi	Resigned	22 January 2014	16th	(Croatia) Luka Bonačić	23 January 2014
Damash	(Iran) Afshin Nazemi	Sacked	26 January 2014	12th	(Iran) Ali Nazarmohammadi	26 January 2014
Zob Ahan	(Iran) Mojtaba Taghavi	Sacked	25 February 2014	15th	(Iran) Firouz Karimi	25 February 2014
Tractor Sazi	(Portugal) Toni	Mutual consent	29 April 2014	6th, post-season	(Iran) Rasoul Khatibi	31 May 2014

== Foreign players ==
Club	Player 1	Player 2	Player 3	Asian Player	Former Players
Damash Gilan					(Burkina Faso) Boubacar Kébé
Esteghlal	(Brazil) Tony	(Burkina Faso) Boubacar Kébé	(Trinidad and Tobago) Jlloyd Samuel		(Serbia) Goran Lovre
Esteghlal Khuzestan	(Brazil) Fábio Carvalho	(Mali) Idrissa Traoré	(Mali) Moussa Coulibaly		
Fajr Sepasi	(Bosnia and Herzegovina) Samir Bekrić				
Foolad Khuzestan	(Brazil) Chimba	(Brazil) Leandro Chaves	(Brazil) Sérgio Rafael		(Brazil) Leandro Padovani
Gostaresh	(United States) Diego Chávarri				
Malavan	(Moldova) Serghei Pașcenco				(Croatia) Ivor Weitzer
Mes Kerman	(Brazil) Edinho	(Brazil) Juninho Tardelli	(Ghana) David Opoku	(Australia) Iain Fyfe	(Bosnia and Herzegovina) Samir Bekrić
Naft Tehran	(Azerbaijan) Ali Ghorbani				
Persepolis	(Brazil) Nilson	(Montenegro) Marko Šćepanović			
Rah Ahan	(Cameroon) David Wirikom				(Armenia) Valeri Aleksanyan (Brazil) Marcão
Saba Qom					
Saipa					(Romania) Cosmin Vancea
Sepahan	(Albania) Ervin Bulku	(Albania) Xhevahir Sukaj		(Indonesia) Sergio van Dijk	(Montenegro) Radomir Đalović
Tractor Sazi	(Brazil) Rodrigo Pimpão				(Serbia) Marko Basara
Zob Ahan	(Brazil) Carlos	(Colombia) Víctor Guazá	(Montenegro) Milan Mijatović		(Armenia) Gevorg Kasparov

== League table ==
Pos	Team	Pld	W	D	L	GF	GA	GD	Pts	Qualification or relegation
1	Foolad (C)	30	16	9	5	36	24	+12	57	Qualification for the 2015 AFC Champions League group stage
2	Persepolis	30	16	8	6	34	15	+19	55 (Note: Esteghlal, Malavan, Damash, Persepolis and Tractor Sazi were deducted 1 point due to poor fan behavior in their home matches.)	Qualification for the 2015 AFC Champions League group stage
3	Naft Tehran	30	15	9	6	39	23	+16	54	Qualification for the 2015 AFC Champions League qualifying play-off
4	Sepahan	30	14	12	4	36	20	+16	54	
5	Esteghlal	30	15	9	6	34	25	+9	53	
6	Tractor Sazi	30	11	13	6	39	33	+6	45	Qualification for the 2015 AFC Champions League group stage (Note: Tractor Sazi secured qualification for the 2015 AFC Champions League through winning the 2013–14 Hazfi Cup.)
7	Malavan	30	13	6	11	40	33	+7	44	
8	Saipa	30	7	14	9	26	31	−5	35	
9	Saba Qom	30	8	9	13	32	38	−6	33	
10	Gostaresh	30	7	11	12	31	34	−3	32	
11	Rah Ahan	30	7	10	13	25	34	−9	31	
12	Est. Khuzestan	30	6	11	13	26	37	−11	29	
13	Zob Ahan	30	6	11	13	24	36	−12	29	
14	Fajr Sepasi (R)	30	6	11	13	20	34	−14	29	Qualification to relegation play-offs
15	Damash (R)	30	5	12	13	30	40	−10	26	Relegation to 2014–15 Azadegan League
16	Mes Kerman (R)	30	1	19	10	21	36	−15	22	Relegation to 2014–15 Azadegan League

Updated to match(es) played on 11 April 2014. Source: FIFA.com
Rules for classification: 1) points; 2) goal difference; 3) number of goals scored.
(C) Champions; (R) Relegated

== Results ==
Home \ Away	DMG	EST	ESK	FJR	FOL	GOS	MLV	MES	NAF	PRS	RAH	SAB	SAP	SEP	TRK	ZOB
Damash		1–2	0–0	1–3	1–2	1–2	0–3	1–1	1–1	0–1	1–1	2–1	1–1	1–1	1–0	5–1
Esteghlal	1–0		1–0	1–0	2–0	0–0	1–0	1–1	0–1	0–0	3–1	1–0	2–0	1–2	1–3	1–1
Est. Khuzestan	1–1	2–0		0–0	0–2	3–1	0–2	0–0	2–4	0–1	3–2	1–0	0–0	0–2	1–4	2–0
Fajr Sepasi	2–2	2–4	2–1		0–0	0–0	2–1	1–1	0–1	1–1	0–1	1–2	0–1	2–1	0–0	0–0
Foolad	3–1	0–1	3–2	1–0		1–1	1–0	1–0	0–2	2–1	0–0	2–0	4–1	0–0	2–1	1–0
Gostaresh	0–2	1–2	1–1	2–0	0–1		1–2	0–0	1–2	1–0	5–0	0–1	1–2	1–1	1–2	2–0
Malavan	0–0	4–2	2–1	3–1	1–2	2–1		2–1	2–0	0–1	0–1	2–1	0–3	2–3	1–1	1–2
Mes Kerman	1–1	1–1	1–1	1–2	2–2	1–2	1–3		0–1	0–6	2–0	0–0	2–2	0–0	1–1	0–0
Naft Tehran	0–0	1–1	0–0	2–0	1–1	4–1	0–0	1–0		1–0	2–1	1–2	2–1	2–2	3–0	0–1
Persepolis	2–0	0–0	0–0	1–0	3–1	1–0	1–0	2–0	0–0		2–2	3–1	1–0	2–0	1–0	2–1
Rah Ahan	1–0	0–1	1–0	0–0	0–1	1–2	0–0	0–0	1–3	0–1		0–0	0–0	1–1	1–2	0–1
Saba Qom	3–2	1–2	1–1	3–0	0–1	2–2	1–0	2–2	1–2	1–1	2–1		0–0	0–1	1–3	2–1
Saipa	2–3	0–1	1–1	0–0	0–0	1–1	1–2	1–0	0–0	1–0	0–3	2–1		0–0	3–3	1–0
Sepahan	2–0	0–0	3–1	3–0	2–0	0–0	1–2	0–0	1–0	2–0	0–0	2–1	2–2		0–1	1–0
Tractor Sazi	0–0	1–1	1–0	0–0	2–2	1–1	2–2	0–0	1–0	1–0	0–3	1–1	1–0	1–2		2–2
Zob Ahan	2–1	2–0	0–1	0–1	0–0	0–0	1–1	1–1	3–2	0–0	2–3	1–1	0–0	0–1	2–4	

Updated to match(es) played on 11 April 2014. Source: IPL Stats
Legend: Blue = home team win; Yellow = draw; Red = away team win.

== Positions by round ==
Team ╲ Round	1	2	3	4	5	6	7	8	9	10	11	12	13	14	15	16	17	18	19	20	21	22	23	24	25	26	27	28	29	30
Foolad	15	8	4	1	1	1	1	1	1	1	1	1	1	2	3	4	5	5	4	4	3	2	2	2	2	2	1	1	2	1
Persepolis	4	5	2	5	4	5	3	5	2	4	3	5	2	1	1	5	3	1	1	1	2	3	3	5	3	5	3	2	4	2
Naft Tehran	5	7	9	6	3	3	4	2	3	3	5	4	5	4	5	2	2	3	2	3	4	5	5	3	4	3	4	3	1	3
Sepahan	1	1	1	4	6	4	6	6	5	2	2	2	3	5	6	6	6	6	6	6	5	4	4	4	5	4	5	5	5	4
Esteghlal	3	6	6	2	2	2	2	4	6	6	7	8	7	6	2	3	4	4	3	2	1	1	1	1	1	1	2	4	3	5
Tractor Sazi	12	12	8	3	5	6	5	3	4	5	4	3	4	3	4	1	1	2	5	5	6	6	6	6	6	6	7	7	7	6
Malavan	14	13	13	11	12	14	12	13	13	13	14	15	14	12	9	9	7	8	7	8	8	7	7	7	7	7	6	6	6	7
Saipa	8	15	14	12	11	7	10	7	7	10	10	7	6	7	7	7	8	7	8	7	7	8	8	8	8	9	9	8	8	8
Saba Qom	6	2	3	7	7	8	7	8	10	9	9	10	10	11	12	12	12	13	13	12	12	12	11	10	10	10	10	10	10	9
Gostaresh	11	11	11	9	8	9	8	9	11	8	6	6	8	9	10	11	11	11	11	11	9	9	9	9	9	8	8	9	9	10
Rah Ahan	9	3	5	8	9	12	14	14	14	15	13	13	15	15	14	14	13	12	12	13	13	14	14	14	14	13	12	11	11	11
Est. Khuzestan	2	4	7	10	10	13	11	10	12	12	11	11	9	10	11	10	10	10	10	9	10	10	10	11	11	11	11	12	12	12
Zob Ahan	16	14	15	15	15	10	9	11	8	11	12	12	12	13	13	13	14	14	14	14	14	13	13	13	13	14	15	15	13	13
Fajr Sepasi	13	16	16	16	16	16	16	15	15	14	15	14	13	14	15	15	15	15	15	16	16	16	15	15	15	15	14	14	14	14
Damash	7	9	10	13	14	11	13	12	9	7	8	9	11	8	8	8	9	9	9	10	11	11	12	12	12	12	13	13	15	15
Mes Kerman	10	10	12	14	13	15	15	16	16	16	16	16	16	16	16	16	16	16	16	15	15	15	16	16	16	16	16	16	16	16

Leader
2015 AFC Champions League
Relegation to Play-offs Qualification
Relegation to 2014–15 Azadegan League

Source: FIFA.com (in English)

== Clubs season-progress ==
Team ╲ Round	1	2	3	4	5	6	7	8	9	10	11	12	13	14	15	16	17	18	19	20	21	22	23	24	25	26	27	28	29	30
Foolad	L	W	W	W	W	W	L	W	D	W	W	L	D	L	D	D	D	W	W	D	W	W	D	W	D	W	D	W	L	W
Persepolis	W	D	W	L	W	L	W	D	W	L	W	D	W	W	D	L	W	W	W	W	D	L	D	L	W	D	W	W	D	W
Naft Tehran	W	L	D	W	W	W	L	W	D	D	L	W	D	W	D	W	W	D	W	D	D	L	W	W	L	W	D	W	W	L
Sepahan	W	W	D	L	L	W	D	D	W	W	W	D	D	L	D	D	D	D	W	W	W	W	D	W	L	W	D	D	W	W
Esteghlal	W	L	W	W	W	W	L	D	L	D	W	W	D	W	D	D	D	W	W	W	W	W	D	D	D	W	L	L	W	L
Tractor Sazi	L	D	W	W	D	D	W	W	D	L	W	W	D	W	D	W	W	D	L	D	D	D	D	D	D	L	L	L	W	W
Malavan	L	D	D	W	L	L	W	L	D	D	L	L	W	W	W	W	W	L	W	L	D	W	W	D	W	L	W	W	L	L
Saipa	D	L	D	W	D	W	L	W	D	L	L	W	D	W	W	L	D	D	L	W	D	D	L	L	D	L	D	D	D	D
Saba Qom	W	W	L	L	D	L	W	L	L	W	L	D	D	D	L	L	L	L	L	W	L	W	D	W	D	D	L	W	D	D
Gostaresh	L	D	D	W	D	L	W	D	L	W	W	L	L	L	D	D	L	D	D	L	W	W	L	W	D	D	D	L	L	L
Rah Ahan	D	W	D	L	L	L	L	D	D	L	W	L	L	L	W	L	D	W	L	D	L	L	D	W	D	D	W	W	D	L
Est. Khuzestan	W	D	D	L	L	L	W	D	L	L	W	D	W	L	D	W	D	D	L	D	L	L	W	L	D	D	D	L	L	L
Zob Ahan	L	D	L	D	D	W	W	L	W	L	L	D	D	L	L	L	L	D	D	L	D	W	D	D	D	L	L	L	W	W
Fajr Sepasi	L	L	L	L	W	D	L	D	D	W	L	D	W	L	L	L	D	L	D	L	D	L	W	L	D	D	W	D	D	W
Damash	D	D	D	L	L	W	D	D	W	W	L	D	L	W	D	W	L	D	L	L	L	L	L	L	D	D	D	L	L	D
Mes Kerman	D	D	L	D	D	L	L	L	D	D	L	D	L	D	D	W	D	L	D	D	D	L	L	L	D	D	D	D	D	D

Source: IPL Stats
W = Win; D = Draw; L = Lose

== Relegation play-offs ==
Fajr Sepasi as 14th-placed team faced play-off winner of 2013–14 Azadegan League, Paykan in a two-legged play-off.

26 April 2014
20:30 CEST

Fajr Sepasi	0 – 0	Paykan
	Report

Hafezieh, Shiraz
Attendance: 12,984
Referee: Mohammad Reza Akbarian
1 May 2014
18:00 CEST

Paykan	1 – 0	Fajr Sepasi
Halafi 71'	Report

Paykanshahr, Tehran
Attendance: 9,206
Referee: Yadollah Jahanbazi

Paykan won 1–0 on aggregate and promoted to the next season of Iran Pro League, Fajr Sepasi also relegated to the Azadegan League.

== Season statistics ==
=== Top goalscorers ===
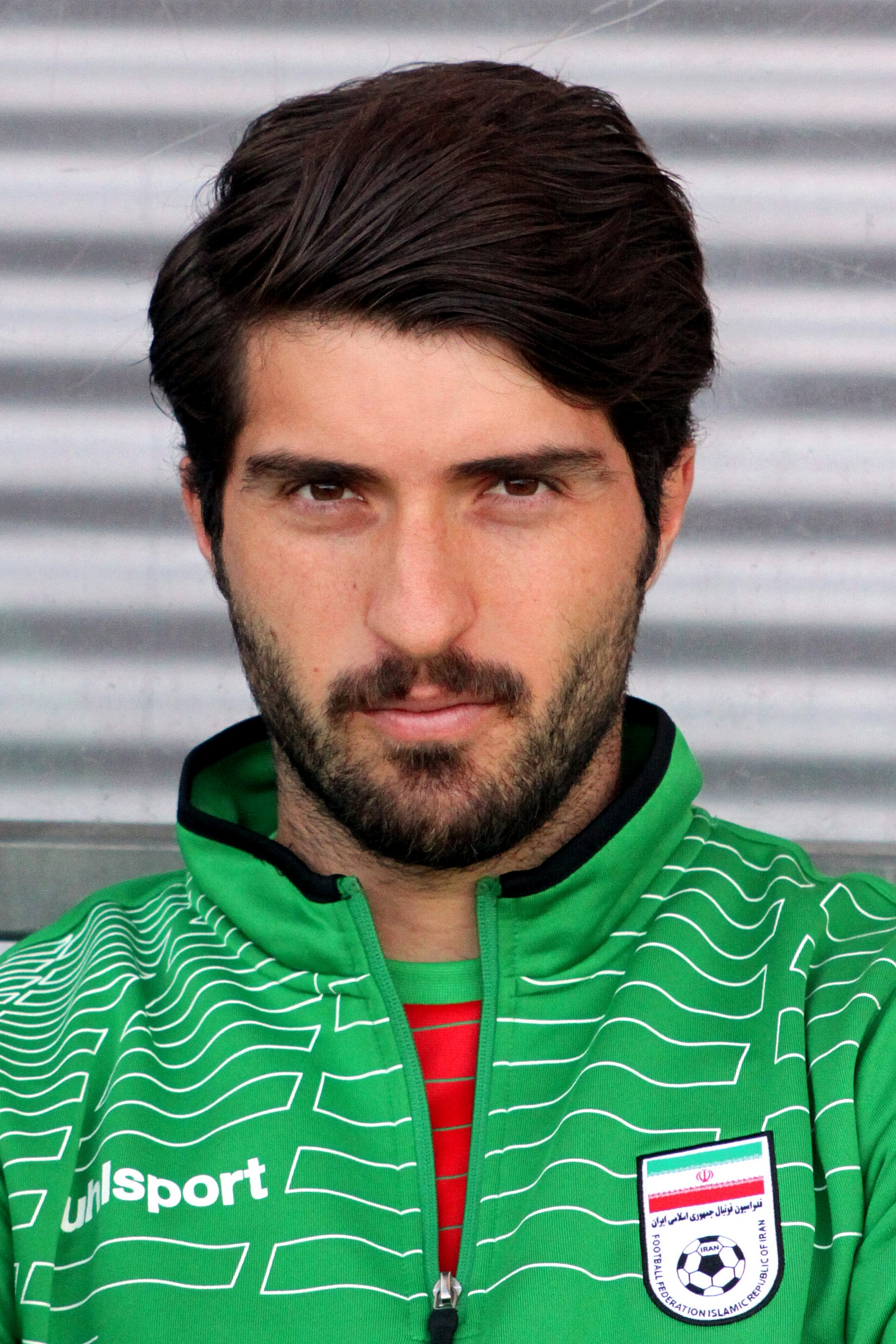
Karim Ansarifard

Rank	Player	Club	Goals
1	(Iran) Karim Ansarifard	Tractor Sazi	14
2	(Iran) Reza Enayati	Saba Qom	13
3	(Iran) Mehrdad Bayrami	Gostaresh	12
4	(Iran) Mehdi Daghagheleh	Malavan	11
4	(Iran) Reza Norouzi	Naft Tehran	11
5	(Brazil) Chimba	Foolad	9
5	(Iran) Jalal Rafkhaei	Malavan	9
5	(Iran) Mehdi Rajabzadeh	Zob Ahan	9
5	(Iran) Sajjad Shahbazzadeh	Saipa	9
8	(Brazil) Edinho	Mes Kerman	8
8	(Iran) Amin Motevaselzadeh	Damash Gilan	8
8	(Iran) Mehdi Sharifi	Sepahan	8
10	(Iran) Mohammad Ghazi	Esteghlal	7
10	(Iran) Farid Karimi	Saba Qom	7
Total goals (Including technical loses)			504
Total games			239
Average per game			2.11

Last updated: 11 April 2014
Source: FIFA.com

=== Hat-tricks ===
Player	Club	Against	Result	Date
(Iran) Karim Ansarifard	Tractor Sazi	Esteghlal Khuzestan	4–1	27 October 2013

=== Clean sheets ===
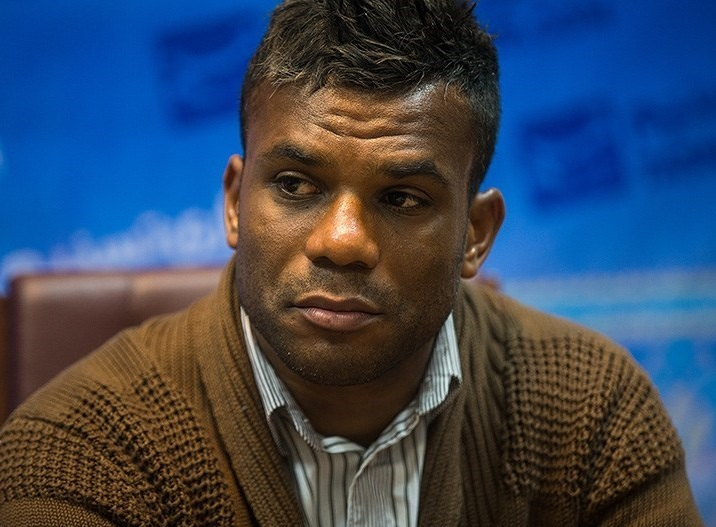
Nilson Corrêa

Rank	Player	Club	Clean sheets	Goals conceded	Match played
1	(Brazil) Nilson	Persepolis	18	15	30
2	(Iran) Rahman Ahmadi	Sepahan	15	16	27
3	(Iran) Mehdi Rahmati	Esteghlal	14	25	30
4	(Iran) Sosha Makani	Foolad	13	14	20
5	(Iran) Alireza Beiranvand	Naft Tehran	12	12	21
6	(Iran) Hamed Fallahzadeh	Rah Ahan	11	23	22
7	(Iran) Mohammad Bagher Sadeghi	Saipa	9	30	26
8	(Iran) Mohsen Foroozan	Gostaresh Foolad	8	30	25

Last Update: 11 April 2014

=== Scoring ===
- First goal of the season: Adel Kolahkaj for Esteghlal Khuzestan against Zob Ahan (24 July 2013)
- Fastest goal of the season: 17 seconds, Kaveh Rezaei for Saipa against Mes Kerman (4 January 2014)
- Latest goal of the season: 95 minutes and 12 seconds, Ali Karimi for Tractor Sazi against Mes Kerman (24 December 2013)
- Largest winning margin: 6 goals
  - Mes Kerman 0–6 Persepolis (13 December 2013)
- Highest scoring game: 6 goals
  - Fajr 2–4 Esteghlal (6 August 2013)
  - Zob Ahan 2–4 Tractor Sazi (6 August 2013)
  - Esteghlal Khuzestan 2–4 Naft Tehran (16 August 2013)
  - Damash 5–1 Zob Ahan (24 October 2013)
  - Mes Kerman 0–6 Persepolis (13 December 2013)
  - Saipa 3–3 Tractor Sazi (11 January 2014)
  - Malavan 4–2 Esteghlal (19 February 2014)
- Most goals scored in a match by a single team: 6 goals
  - Mes Kerman 0–6 Persepolis (13 December 2013)
- Most goals scored in a match by a losing team: 2 goals
  - Fajr 2–4 Esteghlal (6 August 2013)
  - Zob Ahan 2–4 Tractor Sazi (6 August 2013)
  - Esteghlal Khuzestan 2–4 Naft Tehran (16 August 2013)
  - Foolad 3–2 Esteghlal Khuzestan (23 August 2013)
  - Zob Ahan 3–2 Naft Tehran (31 August 2013)
  - Esteghlal Khuzestan 3–2 Rah Ahan (17 October 2013)
  - Saba Qom 3–2 Damash (26 January 2014)
  - Malavan 4–2 Esteghlal (19 February 2014)

== Awards ==
=== Team of the Season ===
Goalkeeper: Nilson Corrêa Júnior (Persepolis)
Defence: Vahid Amiri (Naft), Jalal Hosseini (Persepolis), Hanif Omranzadeh (Esteghlal), Ali Hamoudi (Sepahan)
Midfield: Bakhtiar Rahmani (Foolad), Andranik Teymourian (Esteghlal), Amir Hossein Feshangchi (Malavan), Payam Sadeghian (Perspolis), Esmaeil Sharifat (Foolad)
Attack: Karim Ansarifard (Tractor Sazi)

=== Player of the Season ===
Andranik Teymourian was awarded as the best player of the season among Payam Sadeghian became second. Mohammad Abbaszadeh was also awarded as the best young player of the season.

=== Other awards ===
Hossein Faraki was awarded as the best coach of the season.

== Attendances ==
=== Average home attendances ===
Pos	Team	Total	High	Low	Average	Change
1	Persepolis	442,000	95,000	10,000	29,467	+35.6%
2	Tractor Sazi	325,005	62,000	800	21,667	−9.9%
3	Esteghlal	296,500	100,000	500	19,767	−42.3%
4	Foolad	126,500	49,500	0	9,036	+67.0%
5	Damash	94,000	15,000	2,000	6,267	−6.9%
6	Sepahan	67,200	12,000	0	4,800	+20.9%
7	Malavan	66,500	12,000	1,000	4,433	−26.1%
8	Mes Kerman	61,120	12,000	1,000	4,075	+6.6%
9	Est. Khuzestan	59,250	10,000	500	3,950	n/a
10	Fajr Sepasi	56,900	14,000	1,000	3,793	−22.4%
11	Gostaresh	43,500	12,000	300	2,900	n/a
12	Zob Ahan	42,700	10,000	1,000	2,847	+34.4%
13	Saba Qom	41,150	12,000	500	2,743	+1.4%
14	Saipa	35,600	12,000	100	2,373	−49.9%
15	Naft Tehran	34,660	15,000	60	2,311	−10.7%
16	Rah Ahan	23,300	8,000	0	1,664	−14.3%
	League total	1,815,825	100,000	0	7,631	−4.2%

Updated to games played on 11 April 2014
Source: Iranleague.ir
Notes:
Matches with spectator bans are not included in average attendances
Esteghlal Khuzestan and Gostaresh played last season in Azadegan League

=== Highest attendances ===
Rank	Home team	Score	Away team	Attendance	Date	Week	Stadium
1	Esteghlal	0–0	Persepolis	100,000	6 September 2013	8	Azadi
2	Persepolis	0–0	Esteghlal	95,000	17 January 2014	23	Azadi
3	Esteghlal	1–2	Sepahan	65,000	1 August 2013	2	Azadi
4	Tractor Sazi	1–1	Esteghlal	62,000	8 November 2013	15	Sahand
5	Persepolis	1–0	Tractor Sazi	50,000	24 July 2013	1	Azadi
5	Tractor Sazi	0–0	Mes Kerman	50,000	16 August 2013	5	Sahand
5	Esteghlal	1–3	Tractor Sazi	50,000	11 April 2014	30	Azadi
8	Foolad	0–1	Esteghlal	49,500	6 April 2014	29	Ghadir
9	Tractor Sazi	2–2	Foolad	45,000	19 October 2013	13	Sahand
9	Tractor Sazi	1–0	Persepolis	45,000	29 November 2013	16	Sahand

Notes:
Updated to games played on 11 April 2014. Source: Iranleague.ir

== See also ==
- 2013–14 Hazfi Cup
- 2013–14 Azadegan League
- 2013–14 Iran Football's 2nd Division
- 2013–14 Iran Football's 3rd Division
- 2013–14 Iranian Futsal Super League

Team season articles

- 2013–14 S.C. Damash season
- 2013–14 Esteghlal F.C. season
- 2013–14 Esteghlal Khuzestan F.C. season
- 2013–14 Foolad F.C. season
- 2013–14 Persepolis F.C. season
- 2013–14 Saba Qom F.C. season
- 2013–14 Sepahan F.C. season
