= Esteghlal Khuzestan F.C. =

Iranian football club

- Full name: Esteghlal Khuzestan Football Club
- Nickname: Âbihai-ye Jinub (Southern Blues)
- Founded: 2011; 15 years ago
- Ground: Ghadir
- Capacity: 38,900
- Owner: Iran National Steel Industrial Group
- Manager: Amir Khalifeh-Asl
- League: Persian Gulf Pro League
- 2025–26: Persian Gulf Pro League 11th of 16
- Website: www.esteghlalfc-khz.com
Home colours	Away colours

Esteghlal Khuzestan Football Club (Persian: باشگاه فوتبال استقلال خوزستان, Bašgâh-e Futbâl-e Esteqlâl-e Xuzestân), commonly known as Esteghlal Khuzestan, is an Iranian football club based in Ahvaz, Iran. The club currently competes in the Persian Gulf Pro League after being promoted from the Azadegan League in the 2022–23 season.

This football club should not be confused with Esteghlal Ahvaz. In 2011 they bought Esteghlal Jonub's licence to compete in the Azadegan League. They finished the 2012–13 season in 2nd place in their group and qualified to the promotion play-off. However, they were awarded the direct promotion IRIFF after the group's winner, Shahrdari Tabriz, was relegated due to match-fixing. They won the Persian Gulf Pro League title in the 2015–16 season.

== History ==
=== Founding and early years ===
Esteghlal Khuzestan F.C. was established just before the start of the 2011–2012 season by acquiring the license of Esteghlal Jonub Tehran F.C. who has just been promoted to the Azadegan League (Iran's 1st division). After an average 6th-place finish in the team's inaugural year in the Azadegan League in 2011–2012, the next season (2012–13) turned out to be a different year, with a 2nd-placed finish in group B, the club was promoted to the Iran Pro League for the first time in their history.

=== Promotion to the Pro League ===
In Esteghlal Khuzestan's first year in the top flight, it finished 12th, escaping relegation play-off by better goal difference. In the Hazfi Cup Esteghlal Khuzestan exited the competition in the Round of 32 after a shock defeat to Azadegan League side Alvand Hamedan. Esteghlal finished the 2014–15 season 14th, meaning it would have to play in a relegation play-off against the winner of the Azadegan League promotion play-off winner. Esteghlal Khuzestan defeated Mes Kerman 3–0 on aggregate meaning it had secured a spot in the 2015–16 Persian Gulf Pro League season.

==== 2015–16 season ====
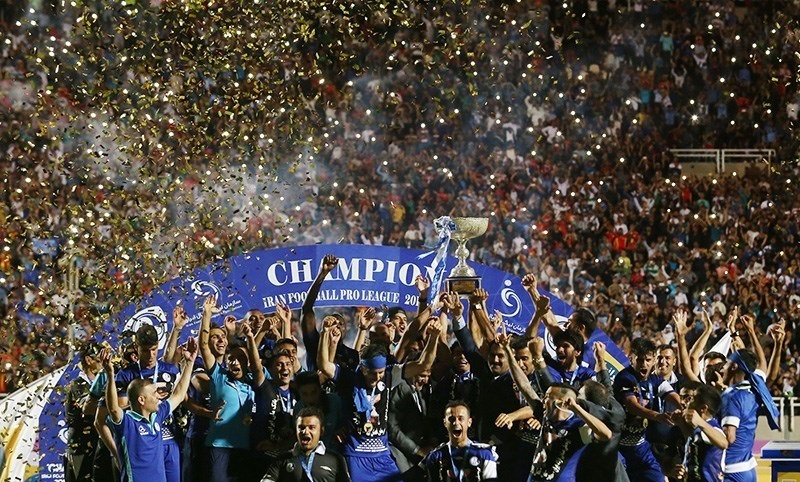
Esteghlal Khuzestan players celebrating after winning league title in 2015–16 season

Before the start of the 2015–16 season Esteghlal Khuzestan signed many of Foolad Novin's players and was a major surprise, as it started well in the season. Esteghlal Khuzestan had four consecutive winning streak at the 12th week, which made Esteghlal Khuzestan finished champion of the first half of the season. After a great result with Abdollah Veisi, Esteghlal Khuzestan managed to keep its shape at the second half of the season. On January 1, 2016, Esteghlal Khuzestan lost to Persepolis which made the race tighter for first place, and also made Esteghlal Khuzestan fall to second place, Esteghlal became first after 17th week. The head coach Abdollah Veisi later said that their main goal was to take place at AFC Champions League. Esteghlal Khuzestan qualified to the AFC Champions League on 8 May, for the first time in its history. Esteghlal Khuzestan won the league title on 13 May after a 2–0 win over Zob Ahan.

==== Relegation ====
Following a poor start to the following season, 6 points were deduced from Esteghlal Khuzestan by FIFA. Dariush Yazdi was sacked and Karim Boostani replaced the coach. Results ultimately did not improve under Boostani and he was replaced with Mohammad Alavi. Esteghlal Khuzestan were relegated from the Persian Gulf Pro League to Azadegan League on 3 May 2019.

== Individual Records ==
=== All Top Appearances ===
#	Name	Nationality	Position	Apps
1	Mohammad Tayyebi	Iran	Defender	133
2	Hossein Bahrami	Iran	Midfielder	107
2	Meysam Doraghi	Iran	Defensive midfielder	107
4	Ali Helichi	Iran	Midfielder	100
5	Aghil Kaabi	Iran	Defender	95
6	Moussa Coulibaly	Mali	Defender	92
7	Vahid Sheikhveisi	Iran	Goalkeeper	87
8	Mehdi Momeni	Iran	Forward	83
9	Hadi Khanifar	Iran	Midfielder	82
10	Mojtaba Rashidi	Iran	Forward	75

=== All Top Scorers ===
#	Name	Nationality	Position	Goals
1	Mojtaba Rashidi	Iran	Forward	23
2	Hassan Beyt Saeed	Iran	Forward	22
3	Ehsan Alvanzadeh	Iran	Forward	21
4	Farshad Janfaza	Iran	Striker	18
5	Javad Aghaeipour	Iran	Forward	16
6	Ali vaziri Panah	Iran	Striker	15
7	Mehdi Momeni	Iran	Forward	14
7	Rahim Zahivi	Iran	Forward	14
9	Hadi Khanifar	Iran	Midfielder	9
9	Ali Kiani Far	Iran	Midfielder	9

== Stadium ==
After the takeover of the club in 2011, the club played its home matches in Ahvaz's Takhti Stadium. After the club promoted to the Iran Pro League, it was decided that club continuing to play at Takthi, while big games like Persepolis, Esteghlal and Foolad playing at newly built Ghadir Stadium. In 2015, the club moved to Ghadir permanently, as city rivals Foolad set to move to its private ground.

== Rivals ==
The team competes in Ahvaz derby against two-times Iran Pro League winner Foolad.

== Honours ==
=== Domestic competitions ===
==== League ====
- Persian Gulf Pro League:
  - Winners (1): 2015–16
- Azadegan League:
  - Winners (1): 2012–13

==== Cup ====
- Super Cup
  - Runners-up (1): 2016

== Season-by-season ==
The table below shows the achievements of the club in various competitions.

Season	League	Position	Hazfi Cup	Asia	Notes
2011–12	Azadegan League	6th	Round of 32	did not qualify
2012–13	Azadegan League	2nd	?	did not qualify	Promoted
2013–14	Persian Gulf Pro League	12th	Round of 32	did not qualify
2014–15	Persian Gulf Pro League	14th	Round of 16	did not qualify	Relegation play-off
2015–16	Persian Gulf Pro League	1st	Round of 16	did not qualify	Super Cup
2016–17	Persian Gulf Pro League	7th	Round of 64	Round of 16
2017–18	Persian Gulf Pro League	12th	Semi-Final	did not qualify
2018–19	Persian Gulf Pro League	16th	Round of 16	did not qualify	Relegated
2019–20	Azadegan League	9th	Did not participate	did not qualify
2020–21	Azadegan League	6th	Did not participate	did not qualify
2021–22	Azadegan League	13th	Third Round	did not qualify
2022–23	Azadegan League	2nd	Round of 32	did not qualify	Promoted

== Continental record ==
Season	Competition	Round	Club	Home	Away	Aggregate
2017	AFC Champions League	Group B	(Saudi Arabia) Al-Fateh	1–0	1–1	2nd
2017	AFC Champions League	Group B	(United Arab Emirates) Al-Jazira	1–1	1–0	2nd
2017	AFC Champions League	Group B	(Qatar) Lekhwiya	1–1	1–2	2nd
2017	AFC Champions League	Round of 16	(Saudi Arabia) Al-Hilal	1–2	1–2	2–4

== Players ==
=== First-team squad ===
As of 1 September 2026

Note: Flags indicate national team as defined under FIFA eligibility rules; some limited exceptions apply. Players may hold more than one non-FIFA nationality.

No.	Pos.	Nation	Player
1	GK	IRN	Mohammad Javad Kia ^{U25}
2	DF	IRN	Nima Andarz ^{U21}
3	DF	IRN	Abolfazl Soleimani
4	DF	IRN	Aram Abbasi
5	MF	IRN	Mohammad Soltani Mehr
6	MF	IRN	Mohammad Sharifi
7	FW	IRN	Aref Rostami
8	MF	IRN	Hamid Bou Hamdan (Captain)
10	MF	IRN	Amir Savaed ^{U23}
11	FW	IRN	Arman Mardani
12	MF	IRN	Erfan Sazegari ^{U25}
13	DF	IRN	Mehdi Mousavi ^{U23}
15	DF	IRN	Alireza Karami ^{U23}
16	MF	IRN	Abbas Sharafi
17	MF	IRN	Sajjad Bazgir

No.	Pos.	Nation	Player
18	DF	IRN	Wesam Saki ^{U21}
21	FW	IRN	Sepehr Simanpour
22	GK	IRN	Amir Mombeini ^{U21}
23	MF	IRN	Amir Hossein Farhadi
34	FW	IRN	Javad Zergani ^{U19}
40	MF	IRN	Mojtaba Haghdoust
44	DF	IRN	Mohammad Ahle Shakheh
45	MF	IRN	Omid Mohammadi ^{U21}
55	GK	IRN	Abolfazl Jamei Qamsari ^{U23}
66	DF	IRN	Mohammadreza Mehdizadeh
70	MF	IRN	Morteza Fazeli
75	DF	IRN	Farzad Jafari
77	MF	IRN	Mohammad Mehdi Ahmadi
78	GK	IRN	Mohammad Amin Rezaei
88	MF	IRN	Mohammad Hossein Zavari

=== Out on loan ===
Note: Flags indicate national team as defined under FIFA eligibility rules; some limited exceptions apply. Players may hold more than one non-FIFA nationality.

No.	Pos.	Nation	Player

== Officials ==
=== Coaching staff ===
Staff	Name
Head coach	(Montenegro) Miodrag Božović
Assistant coach	(Iran) Behrouz Makvandi
Goalkeeping coach	(Iran) Karim Boostani
Fitness coach	(Brazil) Rafael Bispo
International manager	(Iran) Behdad Bayat
Doctor	(Iran) Jalal Heydari
Physiotherapist	(Iran) Sadegh Norouzi
Analyzer	(Iran) Habib Eslami
B Team Manager	(Iran) Behrouz Makvandi
Team manager	(Iran) Afshin Komaei

=== List of managers ===
Period	Name	G	W	D	L	GF	GA	GD	Honours
2011–2013	(Iran) Majid Bagherinia	52	22	15	15	52	41	+11	Promotion to the Persian Gulf Cup
2013–2016	(Iran) Abdollah Veisi	132	55	47	30	142	131	+21	Azadegan League; Persian Gulf Pro League
2016–2017	(Iran) Sirous Pourmousavi	30	10	11	9	36	34	+2	
2017–2018	(Iran) Abdollah Veisi	30	8	10	12	29	36	-7	
2018	(Iran) Dariush Yazdi	12	2	4	6	8	18	-10	
2018–2019	(Iran) Karim Boostani	8	0	2	6	5	11	-6	
2019	(Iran) Karim Ghanbari (caretaker)	4	1	0	3	3	6	-3	

== Players in International Tournaments ==
Players who were a member of their national team at International Competitions while playing for Esteghlal Khuzestan.

Cup	Players
(Equatorial Guinea) 2015 Africa Cup of Nations	(Mali) Soumbeïla Diakité

== See also ==
- Esteghlal Ahvaz Football Club – Association football club in Iran
- Esteghlal Dushanbe Football Club – Association football club in Dushanbe, Tajikistan
- Esteghlal Tehran Football Club – Iranian football club in Tehran
