= 2009–10 Hazfi Cup =

Tournament details
- Country: Iran
- Teams: 115

Final positions
- Champions: Persepolis
- Runners-up: Gostaresh Foolad Tabriz

Tournament statistics
- Matches played: 115
- Goals scored: 251 (2.18 per match)

The 2009–10 Hazfi Cup was the 23rd season of the Iranian football knockout competition. Zob Ahan Isfahan were the defending champion.

The cup winner, Persepolis, were guaranteed a place in the 2011 AFC Champions League.

== Participating teams ==
in total 115 teams participated in the 2009–10 season. The teams were divided into three main groups:

- 18 teams of the Iran Pro League: entering at the round of 32.
- 28 teams of the Azadegan League: entering at the second round.
- 69 teams from Provincial Leagues and 2nd Division League: entering at the first round.

== First stage ==
The first stage featured 69 teams.

=== First round ===
Matches were played on 9 November 2009.

No	Home team	Score	Away team
1	Sanat Bargh Tabriz	(w/o)	Montakhab Tehran
2	Zoratkaran Parsabad	(w/o)	Montakhab Markazi
3	Esteghlal Jonub Tehran	1–2	Tohid Bushehr
4	Naz Saram Meybod Yazd	(w/o)	Shahrdari Mahshahr
5	Sandan Iranian Qazvin	1–0	Persepolis Ganaveh
6	Shahrdari Piranshahr	2–0	Heyat Khorasan Jonoobi
7	Zob Ahan Novin Isfahan	4–3	Montakhab Kohgiluyeh
8	Golchin Robat Karim	3–0	Shahin Bandar Gaz
9	Persepolis Kh. Shomali	(w/o)	Montakhab Khuzaestan
10	Persepolis Borazjan	1–2	Persepolis Zahedan
11	Nirooye Zamini Tehran	6–0	Ansar Siman Shahrood
12	Naft va Gaz Gachsaran	7–0	Dar Tak Lorestan
13	Esteghlal Qazvin	2–0	Sanat Arad Golestan
14	Ararat Sanandaj	2–1	Heyat Chaharmahal
15	Shahrdari Bandar Anzali	(w/o)	Foolad Yazd
16	Moghavemat Tehran	4–0	Ariya Sepahan Qom
17	Shahrdari Karaj	3–0	Montakhab Kh. Jonoobi
18	Keshavarzi Minab	(w/o)	Damash Tehran
19	Goal Navad Qaem Shahr	3–2	Nozhan Sari
20	Palayesh Gaz Ilam	(w/o)	Shahrdari Hamedan
21	Montakhab Fars	0–1	Otobos Rani Quchan
22	Panah Afarin Qom	0–6	Shahrdari Yasuj
23	Boroojen Foolad Charmahal va Bakhtiyari	(w/o)	Montakhab Kh. Shomali
24	Naft Ahvaz	3–1	Montakhab Kish
25	Homa Teharn	3–1	Shahrdari Langarud
26	Shahdari Zanjan	(w/o)	Sepidrood Rasht
27	Hasan Abad Tehran	(w/o)	Zob Ahan Ardabil
28	Pas Zahedan	2–1	Saipa Shomal Sari
29	Malavan Sepid Anzali	1–0	Machine Sazi Tabriz
30	Sanat Gaz Sarakhs	(w/o)	Moghavemat Sari
31	Sanat Naft Novin Abadan	(w/o)	Montakhab Kerman
32	Aflak Lorestan	(w/o)	Behzisti Hamedan
33	Hepco Arak	1–0	Armin Tehran

Notes

- Bye to the Second round: Alborz Shahdari Zanjan, Ghand Eslam Abad, Montakhab Ilam

=== Second round ===
Matches were played on 26 November 2009.

No	Home team	Score	Away team
1	Alborz Shahdari Zanjan	0–1	Sanat Bargh Tabriz
2	Zoratkaran Parsabad	(w/o)	Ghand Eslam Abad
3	Tohid Bushehr	(w/o)	Montakhab Ilam
4	Sepahan Novin Isfahan	3–1	Naz Saram Meybod Yazd
5	Sandan Iranian Qazvin	1–3	Mes Sarcheshme
6	Shensa Arak	(w/o)	Shahrdari Piranshahr
7	Zob Ahan Novin Isfahan	(w/o)	Shirin Faraz Kermanshah
8	Sanat Naft Abadan	7–2	Golchin Robat Karim
9	Gostaresh Foolad Tabriz	2–0	Persepolis Kh. Shomali
10	Persepolis Zahedan	3–1	Damash Lorestan
11	Damash Gilan	2–0	Nirooye Zamini Tehran
12	Naft Tehran	2–0	Naft va Gaz Gachsaran
13	Etka Gorgan	3–0	Esteghlal Qazvin
14	Mokhaberat Shiraz	4–0	Ararat Sanandaj
15	Foolad Yazd	1–2	Mes Rafsanjan
16	Kowsar Lorestan	(w/o)	Moghavemat Tehran
17	Shardari Karaj	(w/o)	Shamoushak Noshahr
18	Petrochimi Tabriz	(w/o)	Keshavarzi Minab
19	Bargh Shiraz	1–0	Goal Navad Qaem Shahr
20	Tarbiat Yazd	(w/o)	Palayesh Gaz Ilam
21	Otobos Rani Quchan	0–1	Gol Gohar Sirjan
22	Aluminium Hormozgan	1–1	Shahrdari Yasuj
Aluminium progress 5–4 progress 4–2 on penalties.
23	Iranjavan Bushehr	(w/o)	Boroojen Foolad Charmahal va Bakhtiyari
24	Shahin Ahvaz	2–1	Naft Ahvaz
25	Shahrdari Bandar Abbas	2–1	Homa Teharn
26	Mehrkam Pars Tehran	2–2	Sepidrood Rasht
Sepidrood progress 3–2 on penalties.
27	Omid Hasan Abad	0–6	Nassaji Mazandaran
28	Shahrdari Tabriz	(w/o)	Pas Zahedan
29	Malavan Sepid Anzali	0–0	Sanati Kaveh Tehran
Sanati Kaveh progress 4–3 on penalties.
30	Payam Mashhad	1–0	Sanat Gaz Sarakhs
31	Foolad Novin Ahvaz	1–0	Sanat Naft Novin Abadan
32	Behzisti Hamedan	(w/o)	Hepco Arak

=== Third round ===
Matches were played on 2 December 2009.

No	Home team	Score	Away team
1	Zoratkaran Parsabad	4–0	Sanat Bargh Tabriz
2	Sepahan Novin Isfahan	1–0	Tohid Bushehr
3	Mes Sarcheshme	4–0	Shensa Arak
4	Zob Ahan Novin Isfahan	1–2	Sanat Naft Abadan
5	Persepolis Zahedan	0–1	Gostaresh Foolad Tabriz
6	Damash Gilan	1–0	Naft Tehran
7	Etka Gorgan	(w/o)	Mokhaberat Shiraz
8	Moghavemat Tehran	0–1	Mes Rafsanjan
9	Petrochimi Tabriz	4–2	Shahrdari Karaj
10	Tarbiat Yazd	0–1	Bargh Shiraz
11	Gol Gohar Sirjan	0–1	Aluminium Hormozgan
12	Shahin Ahvaz	0–2	Iranjavan Bushehr
13	Sepidrood Rasht	(w/o)	Shahrdari Bandar Abbas
14	Nassaji Mazandaran	(w/o)	Shahrdari Tabriz
15	Sanati Kaveh Tehran	2–0	Payam Mashhad
16	Behzisti Hamedan	0–2	Foolad Novin Ahvaz

== Second stage ==
=== Round of 64 ===
The 18 teams from the Iran Pro League entered at this stage, leaving 34 teams participating. Two additional matches were played (between 3 teams from the Iran Pro League and 1 winner from the third round), to reduce the total to 32 teams. Matches were played on 8 and 9 February 2010.

No	Home team	Score	Away team
1	Saipa Karaj	1–3	Zob Ahan Isfahan
2	Sanat Naft Abadan	4–2	Rah Ahan Shahr-e-Rey

=== Bracket ===
Round of 32
H	Zob Ahan	2
A	Sanat Naft Abadan	0
H	Shahin Bushehr	3
A	Mes Sarcheshme	1
H	Steel Azin	2
A	Sepahan Novin	0
H	Esteghlal	13
A	Zoratkaran Parsabad	0
H	Mes Rafsanjan	2
A	Pas Hamedan	0
H	Aboomoslem	(w/o)
A	Etka Gorgan	-
H	Damash Gilan	1
A	Moghavemat	0
H	Gostaresh Foolad	3
A	Tractor Sazi	2
H	Sepahan	3
A	Sanati Kaveh Tehran	0
H	Foolad Novin Ahvaz	0
A	Saba	1
H	Malavan	2
A	Sepidrood Rasht	1
H	Nassaji Mazandaran	0
A	Mes Kerman	1
H	Paykan	1(2)
A	Petrochimi Tabriz	1(4)
H	Bargh Shiraz	2
A	Esteghlal Ahvaz	0
H	Alminium Hormozgan	0(5)
A	Foolad	0(4)
H	Iranjavan Bushehr	1
A	Persepolis	2

Round of 16
A	Zob Ahan	3
H	Shahin Bushehr	1
H	Steel Azin	5
A	Esteghlal	4
A	Mes Rafsanjan	2(8)
H	Aboomoslem	2(7)
A	Damash Gilan	0
H	Gostaresh Foolad	1
A	Sepahan	0
H	Saba	1
A	Malavan	0
H	Mes Kerman	4
H	Petrochimi Tabriz	0(3)
A	Bargh Shiraz	0(0)
A	Alminium Hormozgan	1
H	Persepolis	3

Quarter-Final
H	Zob Ahan	0(4)
A	Steel Azin	0(3)
H	Mes Rafsanjan	2
A	Gostaresh Foolad	4
H	Saba	1
A	Mes Kerman	0
H	Petrochimi Tabriz	1
A	Persepolis	2

Semi-Final
A	Zob Ahan	0
H	Gostaresh Foolad	2
A	Saba	0(3)
H	Persepolis	0(4)

Final
Gostaresh Foolad	0 / 1 (agg. 1)
Persepolis	1 / 3 (agg. 4)

Note: H: Home team, A: Away team

=== Round of 32 ===
Matches were played between 8 and 27 February 2010.

No	Home team	Score	Away team
1	Aboomoslem Mashhad	(w/o)	Etka Gorgan
2	Nassaji Mazandaran	0–1	Mes Kerman
3	Esteghlal Tehran	13–0	Zoratkaran Parsabad
4	Shahin Bushehr	3–1	Mes Sarcheshme
5	Malavan Bandar Anzali	2–1	Sepidrood Rasht
6	Foolad Novin Ahvaz	0–1	Saba Qom
7	Steel Azin Tehran	2–0	Sepahan Novin Isfahan
8	Paykan Qazvin	1–1	Petrochimi Tabriz
Petrochimi progress 4–2 on penalties.
9	Iranjavan Bushehr	1–2	Persepolis Tehran
10	Gostaresh Foolad Tabriz	3–2	Tractor Sazi Tabriz
11	Bargh Shiraz	2–0	Esteghlal Ahvaz
12	Mes Rafsanjan	2–0	Pas Hamedan
13	Aluminium Hormozgan	0–0	Foolad Ahvaz
Aluminium advance 5–4 on penalties.
14	Sepahan Isfahan	3–0	Sanati Kaveh Tehran
15	Damash Gilan	1–0	Moghavemat Shiraz
16	Zob Ahan Isfahan	2–0	Sanat Naft Abadan

=== Round of 16 ===
Matches were played between 26 February and 19 March 2010.

No	Home team	Score	Away team
1	Aboomoslem Mashhad	2–2	Mes Rafsanjan
Mes Rafsanjan progress 8–7 on penalties.
2	Petrochimi Tabriz	0–0	Bargh Shiraz
Petrochimi progress 3–0 on penalties.
3	Persepolis Tehran	3–1	Aluminium Hormozgan
4	Mes Kerman	4–0	Malavan Bandar Anzali
5	Steel Azin Tehran	5–4	Esteghlal Tehran
6	Saba Qom	1–0	Sepahan Isfahan
7	Gostaresh Foolad Tabriz	1–0	Damash Gilan
8	Shahin Bushehr	1–3	Zob Ahan Isfahan

=== Quarter-finals ===
Matches were played between 18 March and 9 April 2010.

No	Home team	Score	Away team
1	Petrochimi Tabriz	1–2	Persepolis Tehran
2	Saba Qom	1–0	Mes Kerman
3	Zob Ahan Isfahan	0–0	Steel Azin Tehran
Zob Ahan progress 4–3 on penalties.
4	Mes Rafsanjan	2–4	Gostaresh Foolad Tabriz

=== Semi-finals ===
Matches were played on 23 April 2010.

No	Home team	Score	Away team
1	Gostaresh Foolad Tabriz	2–0	Zob Ahan Isfahan
2	Persepolis Tehran	0–0	Saba Qom
Persepolis progress 4–3 on penalties.

=== Final ===
Team 1	Agg.	Team 2	1st leg	2nd leg
Persepolis Tehran	4–1	Gostaresh Foolad Tabriz	1–0	3–1

==== Leg 1 ====
May 12, 2010
16:00

Gostaresh Foolad Tabriz	0–1	Persepolis
	Source	Rezaei 12'

Yadegar-e Emam Stadium, Tabriz
Attendance: 50,000
Referee: Khodadad Afsharian

==== Leg 2 ====
May 24, 2010
18:00

Persepolis	3–1	Gostaresh Foolad Tabriz
Fraga 31' (pen.); Aliasgari 34'; Khalili 77'		Khatibi 73' (pen.)

Azadi Stadium, Tehran
Attendance: 100,000
Referee: Masoud Moradi

== See also ==
- 2009–10 Persian Gulf Cup
- 2009–10 Azadegan League
- 2009–10 Iran Football's 2nd Division
- 2009–10 Iran Football's 3rd Division
- Hazfi Cup Final 2010
- Iranian Super Cup
- 2009–10 Iranian Futsal Super League
