= 2009–10 Azadegan League =

19th season of Azadegan League

Azadegan League
- Season: 2009–10
- Champions: Shahrdari Tabriz; 1st Azadegan League title Naft Tehran; 1st Azadegan League title
- Promoted: Shahrdari Tabriz; Naft Tehran; Sanat Naft
- Relegated: Shamoushak Noshahr; Shahin Ahvaz; Foolad Novin; Kowsar Lorestan
- Matches: 364
- Goals: 820 (2.25 per match)
- Top goalscorer: Ali Karimi; Mostafa Shojaei; Mostafa Shojaei (17 goals)
- Biggest home win: Sh. Tabriz 7–1 Shahin Ahvaz (4 March 2010)
- Biggest away win: Shahin Ahvaz 1–6 Sh. Bandar Abbas (21 June 2010)
- Highest scoring: Sh. Tabriz 7–1 Shahin Ahvaz (4 March 2010)
- Highest attendance: 15,000; Nassaji – Damash (13 November 2009); Nassaji – Bargh Shiraz (11 December 2009); Nassaji – Foolad Novin (15 January 2010); Nassaji – Mehrkam Pars (19 February 2010); Nassaji – Mes Sarcheshmeh (8 April 2010); Nassaji – Aluminium Hormozgan (23 April 2010); Sanat Naft – Sh. Tabriz (23 April 2010); Nassaji – Gostaresh (11 June 2010); Sanat Naft – Tarbiat Yazd (27 June 2010)
- Lowest attendance: 0 (spectator ban); Nassaji – Shensa Arak (1 January 2010); Sh. Bandar Abbas – Shahin Ahvaz (8 January 2010); Mes Rafsanjan – Shahin Ahvaz (19 January 2010); Payam Mashhad – Shahin Ahvaz (18 March 2010); Gol Gohar – Kowsar Lorestan (21 June 2010); Iranjavan – Shahin Ahvaz (27 June 2010)
- Total attendance: 954,900
- Average attendance: 2,667

The 2009–10 Azadegan League was the 19th season of the Azadegan League and ninth as the second highest division since its establishment in 1991. The season featured 19 teams from the 2008–09 Azadegan League, three new teams relegated from the 2008–09 Persian Gulf Cup (Payam Mashhad, Damash and Bargh Shiraz) and four new teams promoted from the 2008–09 2nd Division (Sanati Kaveh, Foolad Novin, Mes Sarcheshmeh and Naft Tehran). Gostaresh Foulad replaced Niroye Zamini while Iranjavan replaced Moghavemat Mersad. Aluminium Arak changed their name to Shensa Arak. The league started on 10 August 2009 and ended on 27 June 2010. Shahrdari Tabriz and Naft Tehran won the Azadegan League title for the first time in their history. Shahrdari Tabriz, Naft Tehran and Sanat Naft won promotion to the Persian Gulf Cup.

== Events ==
=== Start of season ===
- The league was to feature three teams relegated from Persian Gulf Cup in 2008–09; Bargh Shiraz, Damash Gilan, and Payam Mashhad.
- It featured four teams promoted from 2009 to 2010 Azadegan League: Folad Novin, Naft Tehran, Mes Sarcheshme, and Sanati Kaveh.
- Gostaresh Foolad ended its 2008/2009 3rd Division campaign in first place( Group A) and can promoted in 2nd Division. They bought Niroye Zamini. So They currently play the 2009–10 Azadegan League.
- Iranjavan ended its 2008/2009 2nd Division campaign in third place( Group A) and can not promoted in 2009–10 Azadegan League. On 30 August 2009 they bought Moghavemat Mersad and they returned to Azadegan League.
- In September 2009 Aluminium Arak F.C. terminated their sports activities due to financial problems. Shensa Arak F.C. took over their license.

== Teams ==
Locations of clubs in 2009–10 Azadegan League

=== Group A ===
Team	City	Venue	Capacity	Head coach	Past Season
Damash Lorestan	Dorood	Takhti	10,000	(Iran) Markar Aghajanian	4th in Azadegan League/B
Etka	Gorgan	Karim Abad	15,000	(Iran) Hadi Bargizar	10th in Azadegan League/B
Iranjavan	Bushehr	Shahid Beheshti	15,000	(Iran) Abdolrahim Kharazmi	3rd in 2nd Division/A
Mes Rafsanjan	Rafsanjan	Noushabad	10,000	(Iran) Akbar Zabardast	3rd in Azadegan League/B
Payam Mashhad	Mashhad	Samen	35,000	(Iran) Ali Hanteh	16th in Persian Gulf Cup
Sanat Naft Abadan F.C.	Abadan	Takhti Abadan	22,000	(Iran) Bijan Zolfagharnasab	7th in Azadegan League/A
Sanati Kaveh	Tehran	Aliaf Stadium	5,000	(Iran) Ahmad Khodadad	1st in 2nd Division/A
Shamoushak	Noshahr	Shohada	6,000	(Iran) Mokhtar Babaei	11th in Azadegan League/B
Shahin Ahvaz	Ahvaz	Takhti	30,000	(Iran) Saeed Salamat	12th in Azadegan League/B
Shahrdari Tabriz	Tabriz	Bagh Shomal	20,000	(Iran) Akbar Misaghian	2nd in Azadegan League/A
Shahrdari Bandar Abbas	Bandar Abbas	Takhti Bandar Abbas	10,000	(Iran) Abbas Sarkhab	11th in Azadegan League/A
Sepahan Novin	Isfahan	Safaiye	15,000	(Iran) Amrollah Soltani	6th in Azadegan League/A
Tarbiat Yazd	Yazd	Nassiri	6,000	(Iran) Golmohammadi	5th in Azadegan League/B
Payam Mokhaberat	Shiraz	Hafezieh	20,000	(Iran) Jafar Fatahi	8th in Azadegan League/B

=== Group B ===
Team	City	Venue	Capacity	Head coach	Past Season
Aluminium Hormozgan	Bandar Abbas	Takhti	10,000	(Croatia) Vinko Begović	2nd in Azadegan League/B
Bargh Shiraz	Shiraz	Hafezieh	20,000	(Iran) Asghar Kalantari	18th in Persian Gulf Cup
Damash Gilan	Rasht	Sardar Jangal	15,000	(Iran) Firouz Karimi	17th in Persian Gulf Cup
Folad Novin	Ahvaz	Takhti	30,000	(Iran) Fereydon Hardani	2nd in 2nd Division/A
Gostaresh Foolad	Tabriz	Bagh Shomal	20,000	(Iran) Hossien Khatibi	3rd Division Champions
Gol Gohar	Sirjan	Imam Ali	2,000	(Iran) Ghasem Shehba	5th in Azadegan League/A
Kowsar Lorestan	Khorramabad	Takhti Khorramabad	10,000	(Iran) Ebrahim Talebi	8th in Azadegan League/A
Petrochimi	Tabriz	Bagh Shomal	20,000	(North Macedonia) Zoran Smilevski	3rd in Azadegan League/A
Shensa Arak	Arak	Imam Khomeini	15,000	(Brazil) Savio Souza	4th in Azadegan League/A
Shirin Faraz	Kermanshah	Azadi Stadium	7,000	(Iran) Mahmoud Fekri	7th in Azadegan League/B
Mehrkam	Eslamshahr	Imam Khomeini	15,000	(Iran) Behtash Fariba	9th in Azadegan League/A
Mes Sarcheshme	Sarcheshmeh	Shahid Zenali	10,000	(Iran) Ali Hadavi	1st in 2nd Division/B
Naft Tehran	Tehran	Amir Abad	5,000	(Iran) Mehdi Dinvarzadeh	2nd in 2nd Division/B
Nassaji	Qa'em Shahr	Vatani	15,000	(Iran) Nader Dastneshan	12th in Azadegan League/A

== Managerial changes ==
Team	Outgoing manager	Manner of departure	Date of vacancy	Replaced by	Date of appointment
Kowsar	(Iran) Reza Ahadi	Sacked	2009	(Iran) Mostafa Ghanbarpour	2009
Shensa Arak	(Brazil) Castro Felore	Sacked	Oct 2009	(Brazil) Savio Souza	20 Oct 2009
Kowsar	(Iran) Mostafa Ghanbarpour	Sacked	Nov 2009	(Iran) Ebrahim Talebi	Nov 2009
Shirin Faraz	(Iran) Mahmoud Fekri	Sacked	Dec 2009	(Iran) Estehghari/ Mortazavi	Dec 2009
Payam Mokhaberat	(Iran) Mehrdad Shekari	Sacked	Dec 2009	(Iran) Jafar Fatahi	Dec 2009
Iranjavan	(Iran) Naser Ebrahimi	Abdicate	Dec 2009	(Iran) Abdolrahim Kharazmi	Dec 2009
Sanat Naft Abadan F.C.	(Iran) Bijan Zolfagharnasab	Abdicate	1 Jan 2010	(Iran) Faraz Kamalvand	1 Jan 2010
Gostaresh Foolad	(Iran) Hossein Khatibi	Abdicate	20 Mar 2010	(Iran) Farhad Kazemi	20 Mar 2010
Nassaji Mazandaran	(Iran) Nader Dastneshan	Abdicate	20 Mar 2010	(Iran) Reza Foruzani	24 Mar 2010
Payam Mashhad	(Iran) Ali Hanteh	Abdicate	12 Mar 2010	(Iran) Davoud Mahabadi	19 Mar 2010
Sanati Kaveh	(Iran) Ahmad Khodadad	Abdicate	5 Mar 2010	(Iran) Hossein Fekri	7 Mar 2010
Mehrkam Pars	(Iran) Behtash Fariba	Abdicate	15 Mar 2010	(Iran) Javad Zarincheh	17 Mar 2010
Naft Tehran	(Iran) Mehdi Dinvarzadeh	Abdicate	20 May 2010	(Iran) Morteza Yeke	23 May 2010
Naft Tehran	(Iran) Morteza Yeke	Abdicate	1 June 2010	(Iran) Nader Dastneshan	2 June 2010

== Final standings ==
=== Group A ===
Pos	Team	Pld	W	D	L	GF	GA	GD	Pts	Promotion or relegation
1	Sh. Tabriz (C, P)	26	18	8	0	43	11	+32	62	Promotion to 2010–11 Persian Gulf Cup
2	Sanat Naft Abadan F.C. (P)	26	13	6	7	38	26	+12	45	Azadegan League 2009–10 Play Off
3	Tarbiat Yazd	26	12	8	6	29	18	+11	44	
4	Sepahan Novin	26	12	5	9	42	31	+11	41	
5	Etka Gorgan	26	9	10	7	21	21	0	37	
6	Sh. Bandar Abbas	26	9	9	8	34	25	+9	36	
7	Mes Rafsanjan	26	8	12	6	30	24	+6	36	
8	Payam Mashhad	26	9	7	10	33	36	−3	34	
9	Sanati Kaveh	26	9	7	10	27	30	−3	34	
10	Iranjavan	26	8	8	10	31	34	−3	32	
11	Damash Lorestan	26	7	8	11	23	33	−10	29	
12	Payam Mokhaberat	26	7	7	12	23	30	−7	28	
13	Shamoushak (R)	26	6	8	12	29	37	−8	26	Relegation to 2010–11 Iran Football's 2nd Division
14	Shahin Ahvaz (R)	26	1	5	20	11	58	−47	8	Relegation to 2010–11 Iran Football's 2nd Division

Updated to match(es) played on 27 June 2010. Source: Persian League
Rules for classification: 1) points; 2) goal difference; 3) number of goals scored.
(C) Champions; (P) Promoted; (R) Relegated

=== Group B ===
Pos	Team	Pld	W	D	L	GF	GA	GD	Pts	Promotion or relegation
1	Naft Tehran (C, P)	26	13	10	3	33	16	+17	49	Promotion to 2010–11 Persian Gulf Cup
2	Damash	26	14	6	6	38	26	+12	48	Azadegan League 2009–10 Play Off
3	Bargh Shiraz	26	14	6	6	33	23	+10	48	
4	Aluminium Hormozgan	26	10	10	6	32	33	−1	40	
5	Mes Sarcheshmeh	26	9	10	7	32	25	+7	37	
6	Shirin Faraz	26	9	10	7	30	26	+4	37	
7	Nassaji Mazandaran	26	8	10	8	27	26	+1	34	
8	Gostaresh	26	9	7	10	34	34	0	34	
9	Mehrkam Pars	26	9	5	12	22	28	−6	32	
10	Gol Gohar	26	8	6	12	30	32	−2	30	
11	Shensa	26	7	8	11	24	29	−5	29	
12	Petroshimi Tabriz	26	7	8	11	23	31	−8	29	
13	Foolad Novin (R)	26	8	5	13	26	36	−10	29	Relegation to 2010–11 Iran Football's 2nd Division
14	Kowsar Lorestan (R)	26	3	7	16	22	41	−19	16	Relegation to 2010–11 Iran Football's 2nd Division

Updated to match(es) played on 27 June 2010. Source: Persian League
Rules for classification: 1) points; 2) goal difference; 3) number of goals scored.
(C) Champions; (P) Promoted; (R) Relegated

== Results table ==
=== Group A ===
Home \ Away	DAM	ETK	IRJ	MSR	PYM	PMS	SNA	KAV	SPN	SAA	SHB	SHT	SHM	TAR
Damash Lorestan		0–0	0–0	1–2	2–2	2–1	1–2	1–1	0–2	3–0	0–0	0–0	2–1	2–1
Etka Gorgan	1–0		0–0	0–1	1–0	2–0	2–2	0–2	0–3	1–0	0–0	1–1	0–2	0–0
Iranjavan	3–1	1–2		2–1	1–3	2–0	0–0	1–2	2–1	3–0	1–1	0–5	2–1	1–0
Mes Rafsanjan	2–0	1–1	2–2		2–2	1–1	1–3	1–1	1–0	3–0	1–0	1–1	1–1	0–1
Payam Mashhad	1–0	2–1	2–2	1–1		1–0	1–1	1–0	2–3	0–0	2–0	0–2	3–0	1–4
Payam Mokhaberat	0–0	0–0	1–0	1–0	2–4		2–1	0–2	2–2	2–0	1–0	0–1	4–1	0–1
Sanat Naft Abadan F.C.	1–2	2–1	2–0	1–1	3–0	4–1		2–0	0–1	1–0	2–1	0–2	1–0	0–0
Sanati Kaveh	0–1	1–1	1–0	0–0	4–2	0–2	0–1		1–2	0–0	3–2	1–2	0–0	0–0
Sepahan Novin	3–0	1–2	1–1	0–2	0–1	1–1	2–1	3–1		3–0	2–2	1–1	2–1	2–1
Shahin Ahvaz	1–3	0–1	0–3	0–2	1–0	0–0	1–2	1–2	1–4		1–6	1–2	1–1	0–0
Sh. Bandar Abbas	4–0	0–1	1–0	1–0	2–1	0–0	3–2	1–2	3–2	0–0		0–0	2–0	1–1
Sh. Tabriz	2–2	1–0	1–0	1–0	2–0	1–0	0–0	2–1	1–0	7–1	2–0		1–0	3–1
Shamoushak	1–0	1–1	1–1	3–3	1–1	3–2	2–3	0–1	2–1	4–1	0–0	1–2		1–0
Tarbiat Yazd	1–0	0–2	4–2	0–0	1–0	1–0	1–0	4–1	2–0	2–0	1–1	0–0	2–1	

Updated to match(es) played on 29 June 2010. Source: Lig 1.ir/
Legend: Blue = home team win; Yellow = draw; Red = away team win.

=== Group B ===
Home \ Away	ALH	BGH	DMG	FOL	GOL	GOS	KOW	MEH	MSA	NAF	NSJ	PET	ARA	SFZ
Aluminium Hormozgan		2–1	0–2	1–1	1–0	1–1	2–1	2–1	1–1	1–1	0–0	3–0	3–2	1–0
Bargh Shiraz	3–1		2–1	2–1	2–1	1–0	1–0	2–1	2–1	1–1	1–0	1–0	1–1	2–1
Damash	2–2	2–1		3–0	2–1	1–0	2–1	0–0	1–0	1–2	1–1	2–1	1–0	0–1
Foolad Novin	2–3	1–1	2–1		2–1	1–1	1–0	0–1	2–1	0–0	4–0	2–0	1–0	2–1
Gol Gohar	2–0	4–3	1–1	4–1		0–0	3–0	1–0	1–1	2–1	1–1	1–1	2–1	0–1
Gostaresh	2–0	0–0	1–3	3–0	3–2		3–3	3–1	3–2	0–1	0–0	0–2	2–1	2–2
Kowsar Lorestan	3–3	1–0	0–3	0–0	0–0	2–3		2–1	1–2	0–1	0–1	2–3	0–1	2–1
Mehrkam Pars	2–2	1–0	1–2	2–1	2–0	0–1	2–1		0–1	0–2	1–3	3–1	1–0	1–0
Mes Sarcheshmeh	1–1	1–1	0–1	2–0	1–0	3–0	0–0	3–0		1–1	1–0	1–0	1–1	3–1
Naft Tehran	3–0	1–0	1–2	2–0	0–1	1–0	3–0	1–0	2–2		1–0	1–0	2–0	1–1
Nassaji Mazandaran	2–0	0–1	4–1	2–0	1–0	1–3	0–0	0–0	3–1	2–2		2–1	0–2	0–0
Petroshimi Tabriz	0–0	0–1	1–1	2–1	1–0	2–1	2–1	0–0	1–1	1–1	1–1		1–0	1–1
Shensa	0–1	0–2	2–2	1–0	2–1	3–2	1–1	0–1	0–0	0–0	2–1	2–1		1–1
Shirin Faraz	0–1	1–1	1–0	2–1	4–1	1–0	2–1	0–0	2–1	1–1	2–2	2–0	1–1	

Updated to match(es) played on 29 June 2010. Source: Lig 1.ir
Legend: Blue = home team win; Yellow = draw; Red = away team win.

== Player statistics ==
=== Top goalscorers ===
==== Group A ====
17 goals

- (Iran) Ali Karimi (Sha. Tabriz)
- (Iran) Mostafa Shojaei (Sepahan Novin)

9 goals

- (Iran) Ali Abolfathi (Sanati Kaveh)

8 goals

- (Iran) Mehrdad Avakh (Sha. Bandar Abbas)
- (Iran) Jalaledin Alimohammadi (Sepahan Novin)
- (Colombia) Carlos Eduardo Salazar (Mes Rafsanjan)
- (Iran) Ghasem Akbari (Etka Gorgan)

7 goals

- (Iran) Meysam Khodashenas (Tarbiat Yazd)
- (Iran) Ruhollah Arab (Sanat Naft Abadan F.C.)

==== Group B ====
12 goals

- (Iran) Rasoul Khatibi (Gostaresh Foolad)

10 goals

- (Iran) Ali Amiri (Damash Gilan)

9 goals

- (Iran) Reza Taheri (Damash Gilan)
- (Iran) Ali Alizadeh (Bargh Shiraz)

8 goals

- (Iran) Amir Rafati (Gol Gohar)

7 goals

- (Mali) Founéké Sy (Nassaji Mazandaran)
- (Iran) Hadi Dehghani (Aluminium Hormozgan F.C.)
- (Iran) Saeed Babaei (Mes Sarcheshme)
- (Iran) Akbar Saghiri (Naft Tehran)
- (Iran) Ahmad Hasanzadeh (Mes Sarcheshme)

== Play Off ==
First leg to be played July 2, 2010; return leg to be played July 8, 2010

Team 1	Agg.	Team 2	1st leg	2nd leg
Damash Gilan F.C.	2-7	Sanat Naft Abadan F.C.	1-5	1-2

=== First leg ===
July 2, 2010
18:00

Sanat Naft Abadan F.C.	5-1	Damash Gilan
Zolfonoun 15'; Rikani 30'; Saki 15'; Mardasi 50' 79'		Amiri 37'

Takhti Stadium, Abadan

=== Return leg ===
July 8, 2010
18:00

Damash Gilan	1-2	Sanat Naft Abadan F.C.
Taheri 40'		Gaúcho Da Silva 37'; Niknafs 86'

Sardar Jangal Stadium, Rasht

== Attendance ==
=== Average home attendance ===
Pos	Team	Total	High	Low	Average	Change
1	Nassaji	142,000	15,000	0	11,833	+65.4%
2	Sanat Naft Abadan F.C.	111,000	15,000	5,000	8,538	+23.9%
3	Damash Lorestan	77,900	10,000	400	5,992	−30.2%
4	Tarbiat Yazd	70,500	10,000	0	5,875	+34.0%
5	Sh. Tabriz	63,000	8,000	2,000	4,846	−8.4%
6	Bargh Shiraz	54,000	8,000	1,000	4,154	−38.6%
7	Kowsar Lorestan	50,000	10,000	500	3,846	−36.3%
8	Shensa	46,000	10,000	1,000	3,538	−32.4%
9	Shirin Faraz	43,500	7,000	1,000	3,346	+93.3%
10	Damash	42,000	10,000	500	3,231	−18.0%
11	Shamoushak	31,500	6,000	500	2,423	+86.4%
12	Sh. Bandar Abbas	24,200	6,000	0	2,017	+47.3%
13	Etka Gorgan	26,200	6,000	100	2,015	−27.2%
14	Aluminium Hormozgan	25,500	4,000	500	1,962	−7.7%
15	Iranjavan	22,550	4,000	0	1,879	n/a
16	Gol Gohar	21,000	3,000	0	1,750	−9.0%
17	Mes Rafsanjan	19,300	2,500	0	1,608	−39.8%
18	Gostaresh	16,800	3,000	200	1,292	n/a
19	Payam Mokhaberat	12,000	3,000	100	923	+126.2%
20	Sepahan Novin	11,900	2,000	300	915	−40.5%
21	Mes Sarcheshmeh	9,000	2,000	100	692	n/a
22	Naft Tehran	7,500	2,500	50	577	n/a
23	Mehrkam Pars	6,550	2,000	100	504	−13.8%
24	Petroshimi Tabriz	5,900	2,000	100	454	+22.4%
25	Payam Mashhad	5,550	1,000	50	427	−93.0%
26	Shahin Ahvaz	4,400	1,000	50	338	−38.1%
27	Sanati Kaveh	2,650	500	100	204	n/a
28	Foolad Novin	2,500	500	50	192	n/a
	League total	954,900	15,000	0	2,667	−13.3%

Updated to games played on 27 June 2010
Source: iplstats.com
Notes:
Matches with spectator bans are not included in average attendances
Bargh Shiraz, Damash and Payam Mashhad played last season in Persian Gulf Cup
Foolad Novin, Mes Sarcheshmeh, Naft Tehran and Sanati Kaveh played last season in Iran 2nd Division
Gostaresh Foulad replaced Niroye Zamini
Iranjavan replaced Moghavemat Mersad
Aluminium Arak changed their name into Shensa Arak

=== Highest attendance ===
Rank	Home team	Score	Away team	Attendance	Date	Week	Stadium
1	Nassaji	4–1	Damash	15,000	13 November 2009	6	Vatani
1	Nassaji	0–1	Bargh Shiraz	15,000	11 December 2009	9	Vatani
1	Nassaji	2–0	Foolad Novin	15,000	15 January 2010	13	Vatani
1	Nassaji	0–0	Mehrkam Pars	15,000	19 February 2010	14	Vatani
1	Nassaji	3–1	Mes Sarcheshmeh	15,000	8 April 2010	18	Vatani
1	Nassaji	2–0	Aluminium Hormozgan	15,000	23 April 2010	20	Vatani
1	Sanat Naft	0–2	Shahrdari Tabriz	15,000	23 April 2010	20	Takhti Abadan
1	Nassaji	1–3	Gostaresh	15,000	11 June 2010	23	Vatani
1	Sanat Naft	0–0	Tarbiat Yazd	15,000	27 June 2010	26	Takhti Abadan
2	Sanat Naft	2–0	Iranjavan	12,000	6 November 2009	5	Takhti Abadan

Notes:
Updated to games played on 27 June 2010. Source: iplstats.com

== See also ==
- 2009–10 Persian Gulf Cup
- 2009–10 Iran Football's 2nd Division
- 2009–10 Iran Football's 3rd Division
- 2009–10 Hazfi Cup
- Iranian Super Cup
- 2009–10 Iranian Futsal Super League
