= 2004–05 Iran 2nd Division =

Iran Football's 2nd Division
- Season: 2004–05
- Champions: Shahrdari Langarud; Pegah Khozestan
- Relegated: Atrak Gorgan; Mes Sarcheshmeh; Chooka Taleshh

During the 2004–05 season, League 2, which is in fact the third tier of the Iranian football league system, was organised in two groups each of ten teams. At the end of the season, Shahrdari Langarud and Pegah Khozestan were promoted to the Azadegan League as group winners.

== Final classification ==
=== Group 1 ===
Pos	Team	Pld	W	D	L	GF	GA	GD	Pts	Promotion or relegation
1	Shahrdari Langarud	18	9	8	1	34	14	+20	35	Promoted Azadegan League
2	Nassaji Mazandaran	18	8	6	4	23	15	+8	30	Play off
3	Nirou Moharekeh	18	8	6	4	26	20	+6	30	
4	Shahrdari Tabriz	18	8	5	5	25	21	+4	29	
5	Pegah Tehran	18	5	8	5	18	19	−1	23	
6	Sepidrood	18	5	7	6	19	18	+1	22	
7	Etka Tehran	18	4	9	5	25	26	−1	21	
8	Hepco Arak	18	3	8	7	15	27	−12	17	
9	Fajr Sepah Tehran	18	3	7	8	16	22	−6	16	Relegation playoff
10	Atrak Gorgan	18	4	3	11	14	30	−16	15	Relegated to 3rd Division

=== Group 2 ===
Pos	Team	Pld	W	D	L	GF	GA	GD	Pts	Promotion or relegation
1	Pegah Khozestan	18	11	5	2	30	14	+16	38	Promoted Azadegan League
2	Ararat	18	10	5	3	25	11	+14	35	Play off
3	Sanat Tehran	18	9	5	4	23	13	+10	32	
4	Payam Mokhaberat	18	8	5	5	25	20	+5	29	
5	Ghonche Sari	18	7	3	8	20	25	−5	24	
6	Persepolis Borazjan	18	4	10	4	22	22	0	22	
7	Kowsar Tehran	18	5	7	6	20	21	−1	22	
8	Petroshimi Tabriz	18	6	3	9	21	22	−1	21	
9	Chooka Talesh	18	3	4	11	11	30	−19	13	Relegation playoff
10	Mes Sarcheshmeh	18	2	3	13	14	34	−20	9	Relegated to 3rd Division

== Promotion playoff ==
Nassaji Mazandaran in Group 1 and Ararat in Group 2 as 2nd-placed team faced play-off 11th-placed team of Azadegan League 2004/05, Niroye Zamini in Group 1 and Ekbatan in Group 2

Pos	Team	Pld	W	D	L	GF	GA	GD	Pts
1	Niroye Zamini	6	3	1	2	9	5	+4	10
2	Ekbatan	6	3	1	2	10	7	+3	10
3	Nassaji Mazandaran	6	3	0	3	7	7	0	9
4	Ararat Tehran	6	2	0	4	7	14	−7	6

== Relegation playoff ==
Fajr Sepah Tehran in Group 1 and Chooka Talesh in Group 2 as 9th-placed team faced play-off winners of 2004–05 Iran Football's 3rd Division, Zob Ahan Ardabil in Group 1 and Sepahan Novin in Group 2.

Pos	Team	Pld	W	D	L	GF	GA	GD	Pts
1	Sepahan Novin	6	3	1	2	7	4	+3	10
2	Fajr Sepah Tehran	6	2	2	2	6	7	−1	8
3	Zob Ahan Ardabil	6	1	4	1	5	7	−2	7
4	Chooka Talesh	6	2	1	3	3	7	−4	7

== See also ==
- 2004–05 Hazfi Cup
- 2004–05 Iran Pro League
- 2004–05 Azadegan League
- 2004–05 Iranian Futsal Super League
