= 2008–09 Iran 2nd Division =

Iran Football's 2nd Division
- Season: 2008–09
- Promoted: Sanati Kaveh; Foolad Novin; Mes Sarcheshme; Naft Tehran
- Relegated: Sanat Gaz Sarakhs; Ararat Tehran; Zagros Sanandaj; Palayesh Gaz Ilam; Tarbiat Bandar Abbas; Pasargad Bojnord

The following were the standings of the 2008–09 Iran 2nd Division football season.

== First round ==
=== Group A ===
Pos	Team	Pld	W	D	L	GF	GA	GD	Pts	Qualification or relegation
1	Nirou Moharekeh	14	8	5	1	22	6	+16	29	Promoted Second Round
2	Sanati Kaveh	14	6	6	2	19	12	+7	24	Promoted Second Round
3	Per. Borazjan	14	6	6	2	25	10	+15	24	
4	Sh. Lahijan	14	5	2	7	14	19	−5	17	
5	Eftekhar	14	4	4	6	11	13	−2	16	
6	Sazan Rah	14	3	5	6	10	18	−8	14	
7	Per. Zahedan	14	3	5	6	14	14	0	14	
8	Sanat Gaz	14	3	3	8	8	16	−8	12	Relegation Play Off
9	Ararat (R)	0	0	0	0	0	0	0	0	Relegation to 3rd Division

Rules for classification: 1) points; 2) goal difference; 3) number of goals scored.
(R) Relegated

=== Group B ===
Pos	Team	Pld	W	D	L	GF	GA	GD	Pts	Qualification or relegation
1	Zob Ahan Ardabil	15	10	3	2	34	11	+23	33	Promoted Second Round
2	Mes Sarcheshmeh	15	7	5	3	28	13	+15	26	Promoted Second Round
3	Sh. Bandar Anzali	15	7	4	4	18	15	+3	25	
4	Sh. Yasouj	15	5	5	5	17	15	+2	20	
5	Damash Tehran	15	5	4	6	15	16	−1	19	
6	Armin	15	5	4	6	17	19	−2	19	
7	Hepco	15	4	5	6	15	22	−7	17	
8	Shandiner Bari	15	4	3	8	15	31	−16	15	Relegation Play Off
9	Zagros (R)	8	0	1	7	3	20	−17	1	Relegation to 3rd Division

Rules for classification: 1) points; 2) goal difference; 3) number of goals scored.
(R) Relegated

=== Group C ===
Pos	Team	Pld	W	D	L	GF	GA	GD	Pts	Qualification or relegation
1	Naft Tehran	16	12	2	2	36	14	+22	38	Promoted Second Round
2	Iranjavan	16	9	4	3	25	14	+11	31	Promoted Second Round
3	Moghavemat Tehran	16	10	1	5	32	18	+14	31	
4	Sh. Langarud	16	7	3	6	31	19	+12	24	
5	Foolad Yazd	16	5	4	7	29	29	0	19	
6	Ard	16	5	4	7	17	20	−3	19	
7	Sh. Shahrekord	16	5	1	10	17	37	−20	16	
8	Palayesh Gaz	16	3	4	9	18	34	−16	13	Relegation Play Off
9	Tarbiat Bandar Abbas (R)	16	4	1	11	11	31	−20	13	Relegation to 3rd Division

Rules for classification: 1) points; 2) goal difference; 3) number of goals scored.
(R) Relegated

=== Group D ===
Pos	Team	Pld	W	D	L	GF	GA	GD	Pts	Qualification or relegation
1	Foolad Novin	16	8	7	1	28	10	+18	31	Promoted Second Round
2	Est. Jonub	16	8	5	3	19	14	+5	29	Promoted Second Round
3	Per. Qazvin	16	6	8	2	19	14	+5	26	
4	Sepidrood	16	6	4	6	22	19	+3	22	
5	Sanaye Talaee	16	5	5	6	18	20	−2	20	
6	Payam Shohada	16	3	7	6	14	20	−6	16	
7	Kheybar	16	4	4	8	14	24	−10	16	
8	Sh. Kerman	16	4	4	8	15	23	−8	16	Relegation Play Off
9	Pasargad (R)	16	3	6	7	18	23	−5	15	Relegation to 3rd Division

Rules for classification: 1) points; 2) goal difference; 3) number of goals scored.
(R) Relegated

== Second round ==
=== Group A ===
Pos	Team	Pld	W	D	L	GF	GA	GD	Pts	Promotion
1	Sanati Kaveh	6	4	0	2	7	5	+2	12	Promotion to 2009–10 Azadegan League
2	Foolad Novin	6	3	1	2	7	5	+2	10	Promotion to 2009–10 Azadegan League
3	Iranjavan	6	2	1	3	5	7	−2	7	
4	Zob Ahan Ardabil	6	2	0	4	6	7	−1	6	

Rules for classification: 1) points; 2) goal difference; 3) number of goals scored.

On August 30, 2009 Iranjavan bought Moghavemat Mersad Football Club for a reported price of around $480,000 so Iranjavan Promoted Azadegan League

=== Group B ===
Pos	Team	Pld	W	D	L	GF	GA	GD	Pts	Promotion
1	Mes Sarcheshmeh	6	3	2	1	8	5	+3	11	Promotion to 2009–10 Azadegan League
2	Naft Tehran	6	1	4	1	4	4	0	7	Promotion to 2009–10 Azadegan League
3	Est. Jonub	6	1	3	2	5	6	−1	6	
4	Nirou Moharekeh	6	1	3	2	4	6	−2	6	

Rules for classification: 1) points; 2) goal difference; 3) number of goals scored.

== Relegation play-off ==
Team 1	Score	Team 2
Shandiner Bari Urmia	0-1	Sanat Gaz Sarakhs

Shandiner Bari Urmia relegated to 3rd Division

April 10, Ghods Stadium, Tehran

Team 1	Score	Team 2
Shahrdari Kerman	1-2	Palayesh Gaz

Shahrdari Kerman relegated to 3rd Division
