= Ali Karimi (footballer, born 1982) =

Iranian footballer

Personal information
- Full name: Ali Karimi
- Date of birth: 30 August 1982 (age 44)
- Place of birth: Tabriz, Iran
- Position: Striker

Senior career*
Years	Team	Apps	(Gls)
2004–2005	Saipa	15	(1)
2005–2006	Tractor Sazi	18	(14)
2006	Pas Tehran	11	(2)
2007	Tractor sazi	17	(8)
2007–2008	Sorkhpoushan	14	(8)
2008–2011	Shahrdari Tabriz	53	(26)
2012	Aluminium	7	(1)
2012–2014	Parseh	10	(5)
- * Club domestic league appearances and goals

Ali Karimi (Persian: علی کریمی; born 30 August 1982) is an Iranian footballer who plays as a striker.

== Club career ==
He played most of his senior career for his hometown teams Tractor and Shahrdari.

=== Club career statistics ===
As of 3 January 2012

Club performance			League		Cup		Continental		Total	
Season	Club	League	Apps	Goals	Apps	Goals	Apps	Goals	Apps	Goals
Iran			League		Hazfi Cup		Asia		Total	
2004–05	Saipa	Pro League	15	0			-	-		
2005–06	Tractor Sazi	1st Division		14			-	-		
2006–07	Pas	Pro League	11	2			-	-		
2006–07	Tractor Sazi	1st Division		8			-	-		
2007–08	Sorkhpooshan	1st Division		8			-	-		
2008–09	Shahrdari Tabriz	1st Division		5			-	-		
2009–10	Shahrdari Tabriz	1st Division	25	17	0	0	-	-	25	17
2010–11	Shahrdari Tabriz	Pro League	27	7	1	2	-	-	28	9
2011–12	Shahrdari Tabriz	Pro League	4	0	0	0	-	-	4	0
2011–12	Aluminium HOR	1st Division	7	1	0	0	-	-	7	1
2012–13	Parseh	1st Division		4			-	-	14	4
2013–14	Parseh	1st Division	14	1			-	-	14	1
Career total				67			0	0		
