= Naft Masjed Soleyman F.C. =

Iranian football club

Naft Masjed Soleyman نفت مسجدسلیمان Luri: نفت سلٛیمۊ
- Naft Masjed Soleyman Logo
- Full name: Naft Masjed Soleyman Football Club
- Nicknames: The Zagros Lions (شیرهای زاگرس, Shirhay-e Zâgres)
- Founded: 1935; 90 years ago
- Ground: Behnam Mohammadi Stadium
- Capacity: 8,000
- Owner: NISOC
- Manager: Mehdi Pashazadeh
- League: League 2
- 2024–25: Azadegan League, 16th Relegated
- Website: naftmisfc.ir
Home colours	Away colours

Naft Masjed Soleyman Football Club (Persian: باشگاه فوتبال نفت مسجدسلیمان, Bashgah-e Futbal-e Naft Masjed Soleyman) (also named Naft M.I.S or Naft MIS) is an Iranian football club based in Masjed-Soleyman, Iran. They currently compete in League 2 after being relegated in the 2024–25 Azadegan League season. Naft Masjed-Soleyman is owned by the NISOC.

Behnam Mohammadi Stadium is the club's home stadium and underwent renovations in 2014 to meet Persian Gulf Pro League standards.

== History ==
=== Establishment ===
When oil was discovered in Masjed Soleyman, there was a rush of workers to the city. The Team was established in 1965 as F.C. Corona Masjed-Soleyman and was composed of Persian, British and Armenian engineers working for the National Iranian Oil Company. The team garnished it first taste of victory in 1973 when it won the Khuzestan Provincial Cup. Before the revolution the most popular team in the city was Taj Masjed Soleyman. After the revolution Taj was dissolved and Naft became the most popular team in Masjed Soleyman.

=== Lower leagues ===
Naft was promoted to the Azadegan League in 2010 after a season in the 2nd Division. In the 2013–14 season Naft Masjed Soleyman finished first in the table with 12 wins and 7 draws and were promoted to the Persian Gulf Pro League. Naft Masjed Soleyman became the first team from the city of Masjed Soleyman to compete in the best league of Iran.

=== Persian Gulf Pro League ===
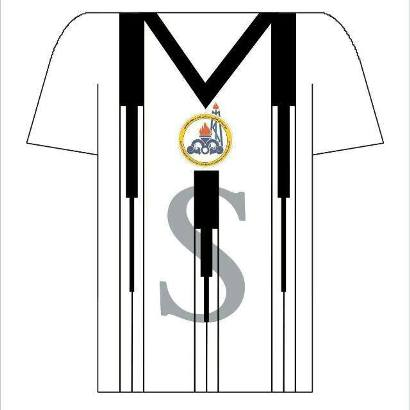
Designed shirt in season 2014–15. The letters MIS are short for the city name.

Before the start of the season, the National Iranian Oil Company improved the Behnam Mohammadi Stadium to meet 2014–15 Persian Gulf Pro League conditions. In their Persian Gulf Pro League (PGPL) match Naft tied 0–0 against Saipa. At the end of the season Naft finished last in the league and was relegated to the Azadegan League.

Naft Masjed Soleyman made it back to the Persian Gulf Pro League in April 2018 after finishing as champions of the Azadegan League.

== Season-by-season ==
The table below chronicles the achievements of Naft Masjed-Soleyman in various competitions since 2009.

Season	League	Position	Hazfi Cup	Notes
2009–10	2nd Division	1st	Second Round	Promoted
2010–11	Azadegan League	4th	1/8 Final
2011–12	Azadegan League	8th	Third Round
2012–13	Azadegan League	3rd	1/16 Final
2013–14	Azadegan League	1st	1/8 Final	Promoted
2014–15	Persian Gulf Pro League	16th	1/8 Final	Relegated
2015–16	Azadegan League	10th	Did not enter
2016–17	Azadegan League	13th	1/8 Final
2017–18	Azadegan League	1st	1/16 Final	Promoted
2018–19	Persian Gulf Pro League	14th	Round of 32
2019–20	Persian Gulf Pro League	8th	Semi-Final
2020–21	Persian Gulf Pro League	13th	Round of 32
2021-22	Persian Gulf Pro League	14th	Round of 16
2022-23	Persian Gulf Pro League	16th	Round of 32	Relegated

== Players ==
As of 28 January 2025

Note: Flags indicate national team as defined under FIFA eligibility rules; some limited exceptions apply. Players may hold more than one non-FIFA nationality.

No.	Pos.	Nation	Player
1	GK	IRN	Vahid Asgharzadeh
2	DF	IRN	Reza Ahmadianzadeh
3	DF	IRN	Mohammad Shahmohammadi
4	DF	IRN	Amin Hashemifar
5	DF	IRN	Meysam Joudaki
8	MF	IRN	Reza Jabbari
9	FW	IRN	Sajjad Abdoei
10	FW	IRN	Abbas Asgari (Captain)
11	MF	IRN	Ali Kianifar
12	GK	IRN	Mohammadamin Karimi Pakdaman
13	FW	IRN	Hassan Mahipour
14	FW	IRN	Babak Moradi
15	DF	IRN	Amir Savari
16	MF	IRN	Farzan Hamooleh
17	FW	IRN	Mohammad Hosseini
19	FW	IRN	Arshia Taheri Asl
20	FW	IRN	Seyed Sajjad Mousavi
21	FW	IRN	Amirhossein Bahador

No.	Pos.	Nation	Player
23	MF	IRN	Mohammad Ahmadi
30	GK	IRN	Abolfazl Boveiri
33	GK	IRN	Shayan Heydari
40	FW	IRN	Milad Ahmadi
44	DF	IRN	Milad Mohseni
46	GK	IRN	Sina Bakhtiarinasab
55	DF	IRN	Azim Gök
66	MF	IRN	Mohammad Beiranvand
70	MF	IRN	Alireza Ebrahimi
72	FW	IRN	Reza Alijani
76	DF	IRN	Shayan Taghizadeh
77	MF	IRN	Sadegh Sadeghi
79	FW	IRN	Mehrshad Karimi
80	MF	IRN	Danial Nozari
86	MF	IRN	Matin Parsa
96	DF	IRN	Ali Mohammadi
97	MF	IRN	Abolfazl Hafezi
99	MF	IRN	Ali Jarrah

== Current managerial staff ==
Position	Staff
Head coach	(Iran) Ebrahim Ashkesh
Assistant coach	(Iran) Majid Bagherinia
Fitness coach	(Iran) Hamzeh Hadadi
Goalkeeper coach	(Iran) Mehdi Sabeti
Team manager	(Iran) Darush Hasanpour

== Achievements ==
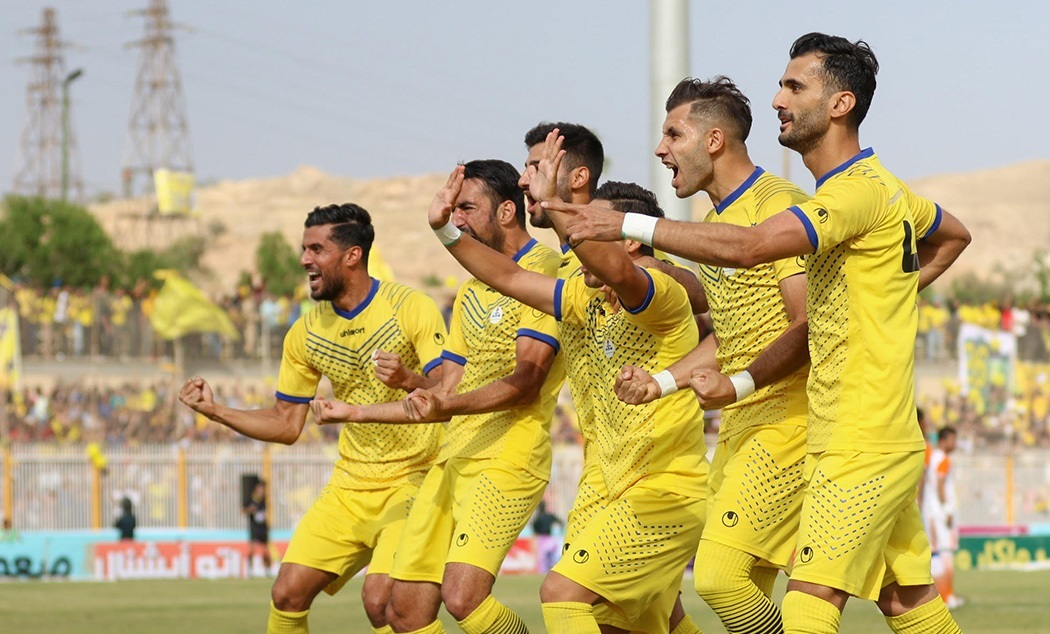
Naft Masjed Soleyman players celebrating promotion to the PGL in the last fixture of 2017–18 season

- Azadegan League:
  - Winners (1): 2017–18
  - Runners-up (1): 2013–14
- Second Division:
  - Runners-up (1): 2009–10

== See also ==
- Sanat Naft Abadan F.C.
- Naft Tehran F.C.
- Naft Gachsaran F.C.
- Sanat Naft Novin Abadan F.C.
- Naft Ghaemshahr F.C.
- Naft Mahmoudabad F.C.
- Persian Gulf Pro League
