= 2010–11 Iran 2nd Division =

Iran Football's 2nd Division
- Season: 2010–11
- Champions: Esteghlal Jonub
- Promoted: Esteghlal Jonub; Saipa Shomal; Nirouye Zamini; Damash Karaj
- Relegated: Armin Qazvin; Homa Tehran; Sanat Gaz Sarakhs; Shahrdari Langarud; Behzisti Hamedan; Kowsar Lorestan; Mes Soongoun; Persepolis Ganaveh; Shahrdari Bandar Anzali; Baam Shahrekord
- Matches: 487
- Goals: 1,190 (2.44 per match)
- Top goalscorer: Hamid Gholami (19)
- Biggest home win: Sanat Naft Novin 6–0 Kowsar
- Biggest away win: Armin 1–5 Chooka; Behzisti 1–5 Niroye Zamini
- Highest scoring: Saipa Shomal 6–2 Chooka

The following were the standings of the 2009–10 2nd Division football season. This is the third tier of the Iranian football league system, after the Azadegan League and Persian Gulf Cup.

It will be divided into two phases: the regular season, played from October 2010 to March 2011, and the Second round from March to June 2011.

The league will also be composed of 32 teams divided into two divisions of 16 teams each, whose teams will be divided geographically. Teams will play only other teams in their own division, once at home and once away for a total of 30 matches each.

In each division, two teams are promoted to Azadegan League, and four teams are relegated to 3rd Division and plus one relegation playoff losers from each division will be relegated to 3rd Division. In total, the league promotes 4 teams to Azadegan League and relegates 10 teams to 3rd Division.

== Teams ==
=== Group A ===
Locations of clubs in 2010–11 Iran Football's 2nd Division

Team	City	Past Season
Armin Qazvin	Qazvin	Replaced for Esteghlal Qazvin
Ashian Gostar Varamin	Varamin	Replaced for Goal Navad
Choka Talesh	Talesh	1st in 3rd Division/A
Damash Karaj	Karaj	Replaced for Damash Tehran
Gostaresh Foolad Bonab	Bonab	Replaced for Machine Sazi
Fajr Jam Bushehr	Bushehr	Replaced for Moghavemat Sari
Homa Tehran	Tehran	1st in 2nd Division/D
Moghavemat Tehran	Tehran	3rd in 2nd Division/A
Nozhan Sari	Sari	7th in 2nd Division/B
Saipa Shomal	Qaem Shahr	5th in 2nd Division/D
Sanat Gaz Sarakhs	Sarakhs	2nd in 2nd Division/D
Shahrdari Ardebil	Ardebil	Replaced for Zob Ahan Ardebil
Shahrdari Bandar Anzali	Bandar Anzali	2nd in 2nd Division/C
Shahrdari Langarud	Langarud	4th in 2nd Division/B
Shahrdari Zanjan	Zanjan	4th in 2nd Division/C
Shamoushak Noshahr	Noshahr	13th in Azadegan League/B

=== Group B ===
Team	City	Past Season
Ariyana Gostar Kish	Kish	2nd in 3rd Division/C
Baam Shahrekord	Shahrekord	Replaced for Heyat Football
Behzisti Hamedan	Hamedan	1st in 3rd Division/A
Esteghlal Jonub Tehran	Tehran	1st in 2nd Division/C
Foolad Novin	Ahvaz	13th in Azadegan League/B
Golchin Robat Karim	Robat Karim	6th in 2nd Division/A
Kowsar Lorestan	Lorestan	11th in Azadegan League/B
Mes Soongoun Varzaghan	Varzaghan	Replaced for Shahin Ahvaz
Naft Omidiyeh	Omidiyeh	1st in 3rd Division/C
Naft va Gaz Gachsaran	Gachsaran	5th in 2nd Division/B
Niroye Zamini	Tehran	3rd in 2nd Division/B
Pas Novin Hamedan	Hamedan	Replaced for Shahrdari Hamedan
Persepolis Borazjan	Borazjan	6th in 2nd Division/D
Persepolis Ganaveh	Ganaveh	6th in 2nd Division/B
Sanat Naft Novin	Abadan	4th in 2nd Division/D
Zob Ahan Novin	Fooladshahr	1st in 3rd Division/B

== League standings and results ==
=== Group A ===
Pos	Team	Pld	W	D	L	GF	GA	GD	Pts	Promotion or relegation
1	Saipa Shomal	30	18	6	6	42	23	+19	60	Promotion to 2011–12 Azadegan League
2	Damash Karaj	30	15	11	4	32	16	+16	56	Promotion to 2011–12 Azadegan League
3	Moghavemat Tehran	30	15	7	8	47	36	+11	52	
4	Nozhan	30	12	9	9	35	33	+2	45	
5	Fajr Bushehr	30	11	11	8	37	20	+17	44	
6	Foolad Bonab	30	10	14	6	41	33	+8	44	
7	Sh. Ardabil	30	13	4	13	44	37	+7	43	
8	Chooka	30	12	6	12	43	40	+3	42	
9	Shamoushak	30	11	7	12	25	30	−5	40	
10	Sh. Zanjan	30	8	15	7	33	28	+5	39	
11	Ashian Gostar	30	10	9	11	35	40	−5	39	
12	Sh. Bandar Anzali	30	9	11	10	30	35	−5	38	Relegation Play Off
13	Homa	30	9	8	13	27	43	−16	35	Relegation to 3rd Division 2011-2012
14	Armin Qazvin	30	8	7	15	35	46	−11	31	Relegation to 3rd Division 2011-2012
15	Sanat Gaz	30	5	7	18	32	46	−14	22	Relegation to 3rd Division 2011-2012
16	Sh. Langarud	30	4	8	18	26	58	−32	20	Relegation to 3rd Division 2011-2012

Updated to match(es) played on 16 May 2011. Source: livelig.com
Rules for classification: 1) points; 2) goal difference; 3) number of goals scored.

Home \ Away	ARQ	AGV	CHO	DAK	FAB	FOB	HOM	MOT	NOZ	SAI	SGS	SHA	SHB	SHL	SHZ	SHM
Armin Qazvin		3–1	1–5	0–2	0–1	1–1	1–2	1–0	1–2	2–1	1–0	1–3	1–0	4–2	1–1	3–0
Ashian Gostar	1–0		4–2	2–1	2–1	1–1	1–1	0–0	1–2	1–2	1–1	1–0	2–2	2–0	0–1	1–1
Chooka	0–1	4–0		0–0	1–1	1–1	2–1	3–1	1–1	1–2	2–1	1–0	2–0	1–0	2–0	2–0
Damash Karaj	1–1	1–0	1–0		1–0	0–1	1–1	1–2	4–2	1–0	3–1	1–0	2–1	1–0	0–0	0–0
Fajr Bushehr	0–0	0–1	1–1	0–0		0–0	4–0	4–2	1–2	2–0	3–0	2–1	3–0	4–0	1–0	2–2
Foolad Bonab	3–2	2–3	3–0	0–0	1–1		4–1	2–2	4–2	0–2	2–2	1–1	0–0	3–1	0–0	2–0
Homa	3–3	0–0	1–0	0–2	1–3	0–0		2–1	1–0	1–0	1–3	1–0	1–0	1–1	0–3	1–0
Moghavemat Tehran	2–1	3–0	2–0	0–0	1–0	1–1	4–3		2–1	3–2	1–0	4–1	1–2	2–1	2–1	3–1
Nozhan	3–0	1–1	2–0	0–0	0–0	2–0	2–1	1–0		2–2	1–0	2–0	1–0	1–1	0–1	0–0
Saipa Shomal	1–0	3–2	6–2	1–0	3–1	1–0	1–0	0–0	2–1		2–1	3–0	0–0	1–2	1–1	2–0
Sanat Gaz	2–2	2–1	2–3	0–1	0–2	0–3	2–0	2–2	3–0	0–1		2–3	4–0	0–0	0–0	0–1
Sh. Ardabil	2–1	0–1	4–2	2–3	0–0	3–0	3–0	3–1	3–0	1–2	3–1		0–1	4–0	1–0	2–1
Sh. Bandar Anzali	1–0	1–1	3–2	1–1	1–1	2–3	2–0	1–2	0–1	0–0	2–1	2–2		0–0	2–0	2–1
Sh. Langarud	1–0	2–1	0–3	0–2	0–0	1–2	1–1	0–2	3–2	0–2	3–3	0–1	2–3		2–4	1–1
Sh. Zanjan	2–2	2–3	0–0	1–1	1–0	1–1	1–1	1–1	1–1	0–0	2–1	1–1	0–0	5–1		3–2
Shamoushak	3–1	1–0	1–0	0–1	1–0	2–0	1–0	1–0	0–0	0–1	0–1	1–0	1–1	2–1	1–0	

Updated to match(es) played on 16 May 2011. Source: livelig.com
Legend: Blue = home team win; Yellow = draw; Red = away team win.

=== Group B ===
Pos	Team	Pld	W	D	L	GF	GA	GD	Pts	Promotion or relegation
1	Est. Jonub	30	17	10	3	42	16	+26	61	Promotion to 2011–12 Azadegan League
2	Niroye Zamini	30	17	10	3	49	26	+23	61	Promotion to 2011–12 Azadegan League
3	Ariyana Gostar Kish	30	16	6	8	51	32	+19	54	
4	Per. Borazjan	30	15	6	9	47	41	+6	51	
5	Naft Omidiyeh	30	12	8	10	33	26	+7	44	
6	Naft va Gaz Gachsaran	30	13	5	12	38	32	+6	44	
7	Foolad Novin	30	10	13	7	40	32	+8	43	
8	Pas Novin	30	10	12	8	36	29	+7	42	
9	Sanat Naft Novin	30	10	7	13	48	41	+7	37	
10	Zob Ahan Novin	30	9	8	13	35	42	−7	35	
11	Golchin	30	8	10	12	34	41	−7	34	
12	Baam Shahrekord	30	9	7	14	33	45	−12	34	Relegation Play Off
13	Mes Soongoun	30	7	12	11	31	41	−10	33	Relegation to 3rd Division 2011-2012
14	Per. Ganaveh	30	9	6	15	36	47	−11	33	Relegation to 3rd Division 2011-2012
15	Kowsar Lorestan	30	10	6	14	29	45	−16	33 (Note: Kowsar Lorestan had 3 points deducted.)	Relegation to 3rd Division 2011-2012
16	Behzisti	30	3	4	23	28	74	−46	13	Relegation to 3rd Division 2011-2012

Updated to match(es) played on 17 May 2011. Source: livelig.com
Rules for classification: 1) points; 2) goal difference; 3) number of goals scored.
Notes:

Home \ Away	ARI	BSH	BEH	ESJ	FOL	GOL	KOW	MEV	NFG	NAF	NRO	PAN	PRB	PRG	SNN	ZOB
Ariyana Gostar Kish		1–2	2–1	0–2	1–1	2–0	3–0	2–1	1–0	2–3	1–3	4–1	2–0	3–2	2–0	4–0
Baam Shahrekord	1–3		5–0	1–0	2–1	1–1	0–2	2–2	0–0	1–0	3–1	0–2	2–2	1–1	3–0	2–0
Behzisti	0–4	1–2		0–4	1–1	1–2	0–1	1–1	2–1	1–2	1–5	1–1	3–4	0–3	2–1	1–2
Est. Jonub	0–0	2–1	1–0		0–0	0–0	1–2	2–1	2–0	3–0	1–1	2–1	0–0	5–1	0–0	3–1
Foolad Novin	1–1	2–0	1–1	1–2		1–1	3–1	5–1	1–0	3–2	1–2	1–1	1–1	3–0	3–1	1–1
Golchin	1–2	2–1	1–3	0–0	2–2		4–1	2–2	1–0	1–1	1–2	2–2	1–0	3–1	1–2	1–0
Kowsar Lorestan	1–3	0–0	2–0	0–2	2–0	1–0		1–0	2–2	0–2	1–0	0–0	0–0	1–0	1–3	2–1
Mes Soongoun	0–4	0–0	3–1	0–0	0–1	1–2	4–2		0–0	0–0	0–1	3–2	3–1	2–0	2–1	1–1
Naft va Gaz Gachsaran	3–0	4–0	5–0	1–1	1–0	2–0	2–1	0–2		1–0	1–2	1–0	3–0	2–1	0–0	0–1
Naft Omidiyeh	1–0	2–0	2–1	0–1	1–1	1–0	1–0	0–0	0–1		0–1	2–2	2–3	4–0	2–0	2–0
Niroye Zamini	1–1	3–0	3–1	1–1	3–1	3–1	1–1	1–0	3–1	1–0		0–0	2–1	1–1	1–1	2–1
Pas Novin	3–0	3–0	1–0	0–1	1–1	2–0	1–1	0–0	0–0	1–0	1–1		3–2	1–0	2–3	0–1
Per. Borazjan	1–0	3–2	2–1	1–1	2–0	2–1	1–0	5–0	2–0	2–2	0–1	1–0		2–0	3–2	2–1
Per. Ganaveh	1–2	2–0	3–2	0–1	0–1	2–0	3–2	2–2	4–1	0–0	1–1	0–1	2–1		2–1	2–2
Sanat Naft Novin	1–1	2–0	6–1	1–2	0–1	1–1	6–0	2–0	4–2	0–1	1–1	2–2	1–2	2–0		3–0
Zob Ahan Novin	0–0	2–1	3–1	1–2	1–1	2–2	2–1	0–0	2–3	0–0	2–1	0–2	5–0	0–2	3–0	

Updated to match(es) played on 17 May 2011. Source: livelig.com
Legend: Blue = home team win; Yellow = draw; Red = away team win.

== Final League standing ==
=== Championship final ===
The first leg to be played on 27 May 2011; the return leg to be played on 2 June 2011

Team 1	Agg.	Team 2	1st leg	2nd leg
Saipa Shomal	1–2	Esteghlal Jonub Tehran	1–1	0–1

=== Third place play-off ===
The single match to be played on 26 May 2011

Team 1	Score	Team 2	Notes
Damash Karaj	2–2	Nirouye Zamini	Damash lost 2–4 on penalties

== Relegation play-off ==
The first legs to be played on 13 June 2011; the return legs to be played on 19 June 2011

Team 1	Agg.	Team 2	1st leg	2nd leg
Gitipasand Isfahan	2–1	Shahrdari Bandar Anzali	1–1	1–0

(R)Shahrdari Bandar Anzali Relegated to 3rd Division.

Team 1	Agg.	Team 2	1st leg	2nd leg
Almahdi Novin Hormozgan	4–2	Baam Shahrekord	2–1	2–1

(R)Baam Shahrekord Relegated to 3rd Division.

== Player statistics ==
=== Top scorers ===
Rank	Scorer	Club	Goals
1	(Iran) Hamid Gholami	Ariyana Gostar Kish	19
2	(Iran) Yaser Saghafi	Ashian Gostar Varamin	18
2	(Iran) Pezhman Shahpari	Naft va Gaz Gachsaran	18
4	(Iran) Nasrollah Derafshi	Moghavemat Tehran	16
5	(Iran) Milad Moradi	Shahrdari Bandar Anzali	13
6	(Iran) Amir Khaledi	Niroye Zamini	12
6	(Iran) Saeed Pirsar-Andib	Sanat Naft Novin	12
8	(Iran) Iman Jafar-Oghli	Saipa Shomal	10
8	(Iran) Ahmad Booazar	Foolad Novin	10
8	(Iran) Rasoul Poorazad	Persepolis Borazjan	10

== Sources ==
- 1st Week
- 2nd Week
- 3rd Week
- 4th Week
- 5th Week
- 6th Week
- 7th Week
- 8th Week
- 9th Week
- 10th Week
- 11th Week
- 12th Week
