= Foolad Yazd F.C. =

Iranian football club

Foolad Yazd فولاد یزد
- Full name: Foolad Yazd Football Club
- Founded: 2004; 13 years ago
- Ground: Nassiri Stadium; Yazd, Iran
- Capacity: 6,000
- Owner: Abolfazl Mousavi
- Chairman: Saleh Askari Shahi
- Manager: Reza Shirdel
- League: League 2
- 2016–17: Azadegan League, 17th (relegated)
Home colours	Away colours

Foolad Yazd Football Club (Persian: باشگاه فوتبال فولاد یزد) is an Iranian football club based in Yazd, Iran. They currently compete in the Azadegan League. The team was founded in 2004.

== Season-by-season ==
The table below chronicles the achievements of Foolad Yazd in various competitions since 2004.

Season	League	Position	Hazfi Cup	Notes
2004–05	Yazd Provincial League	1st		Promoted
2005–06	3rd Division	7th
2006–07	3rd Division	2nd		Promoted
2007–08	2nd Division	11th	1/16 Final
2008–09	2nd Division	5th	Third round
2009–10	2nd Division	4th	Second Round	Promoted
2010–11	Azadegan League	11th – Group B	3rd Round
2011–12	Azadegan League	5th – Group A	Second Round
2012–13	Azadegan League	10th – Group B
2013–14	Azadegan League	10th – Group A	1/16 Final
2014–15	Azadegan League	8th – Group B	1/16 Final

== Club managers ==
- (Croatia) Dinko Jeličić (2014–2015)
- (Iran) Reza Shirdel (Aug 2015– )
