= Pejman Khoubiari =

Iranian footballer

Personal information
- Full name: Pejman Khoubiari
- Date of birth: May 13, 1989 (age 37)
- Place of birth: Shiraz, Iran
- Height: 1.70 m (5 ft 7 in)
- Position: Central midfielder

Team information
- Current team: Havadar S.C.

Youth career
- 2003–2004: Umm Salal
- 2004–2005: Foolad
- Esteghlal Jonub

Senior career*
Years	Team	Apps	(Gls)
2008–2011	Umm Salal		
2011–2014	Al-Wakrah	25	(4)
2016–2017	Al-Khor	21	(1)
2017–2019	Umm Salal	17	(3)
2019–2020	Qashqai	?	(?)
2020–	Havadar S.C.	?	(?)

International career
2008	Iran U20	6	(2)
- * Club domestic league appearances and goals

javad Khoubiari' (Persian: جواد خوبیاری, born January 5, 1989) is an Iranian footballer who currently plays for Havadar football team.
