= Shahrdari Bandar Anzali F.C. =

Iranian football club

- Full name: Shahrdari Bandar Anzali Football Club
- Short name: Shahrdari Bandar Anzali
- Founded: 1999
- Ground: Takhti Stadium (Anzali), Bandar-e Anzali, Iran
- Capacity: 20,000
- Chairman: (Iran) Soheil Mirzajani
- Head Coach: (Iran) Soheil Mirzajani
- League: 3rd Division
- 2010–11: 12th/Group A
Home colours	Away colours

Shahrdari Bandar Anzali Football Club is an Iranian football club based in Bandar-e Anzali, Iran. They competed in the 2010–11 Iran Football's 2nd Division.

== Season-by-Season ==
The table below chronicles the achievements of Shahrdari Bandar Anzali in various competitions since 2007.

Season	League	Position	Hazfi Cup	Notes
2006–07	3rd Division	12th/Group A – Second round		Promoted
2007–08	2nd Division	4th	First Round
2008–09	2nd Division	3rd	First Round
2009–10	2nd Division	2nd	First Round
2010–11	2nd Division	12th/Group A	Did not qualify	Relegated

== Chairman ==
- (Iran) Soheil Mirzajani

== See also ==
- Hazfi Cup
- Iran Football's 2nd Division 2010–11
