= Persepolis Shomal F.C. =

Iranian football club

Persepolis Shomal
- Full name: Persepolis Shomal Football Club
- Ground: Vatani Stadium, Qaem Shahr; Iran
- Capacity: 15,000
- Owner: Persepolis Athletic and Cultural Club
- Chairman: Mehdi Pirouzram
- Manager: Ebrahim Talebi
- League: 3rd Division
- 2014–15: 2nd Division Group C, 10th (relegated)
- Website: http://www.fc-perspoliseshomal.ir/
| Home colours | Away colours |

Persepolis Shomal Football Club is an Iranian football club based in Qaem Shahr, Iran. They are a branch of Persepolis Tehran. They currently compete in the 3rd Division.

== Season-by-Season ==
The table below chronicles the achievements of the club in various competitions since 2008. The club was renamed from Saipa Shomal to Persepolis Shomal in 2013 after it was purchased by Iranian football club Persepolis FC.

| Season | League | Position | Hazfi Cup | Notes |
|---|---|---|---|---|
| 2008–09 | 3rd Division | 1st | Did not qualify | Promoted |
| 2009–10 | 2nd Division | 5th | First Round |
| 2010–11 | 2nd Division | 1st/Group A | Did not qualify | Promoted |
| 2011–12 | Azadegan League | 8th/Group A | Third Round |
| 2012–13 | Azadegan League | 9th/Group B | 1/8 Final |
| 2013–14 | Azadegan League | 13th/Group B | 1/8 Final | Relegated |
| 2014–15 | 2nd Division | 10th/Group C | Third Round | Relegated |

== Coaching staff ==
- (Iran) Ebrahim Talebi (Head coach)
- (Iran) Pejman Jamshidi (Assistant coach)
- (Iran) Salaedin Onagh (Goalkeeper coach)
- (Iran) Mojtaba Rokni (Analyzer)
- (Iran) Aref Mohammadkhani (Technical manager)

As of January 18, 2014

== First Team Squad ==
Note: Flags indicate national team as defined under FIFA eligibility rules; some limited exceptions apply. Players may hold more than one non-FIFA nationality.

| No. | Pos. | Nation | Player |
|---|---|---|---|
| — | | IRN | Sina Abdi |
| — | | IRN | Alireza Aghanejad |
| — | FW | IRN | Ghasem Akbari |
| — | | IRN | Shoeyb Amiri |
| — | | IRN | Mehdi Taheri |
| — | | IRN | Mostafa Babaei |
| — | MF | IRN | Amir Hossein Mohammad |
| — | | IRN | Rasoul Belaghi |
| — | | IRN | Hani Esmaeili |
| — | | IRN | Mehdi Azari |
| — | | IRN | Jafar Fooladi |
| — | | IRN | Mohammad Gorji |
| — | | IRN | Iman Jafaroğlu |
| — | GK | IRN | Hamzeh Janivaki |
| — | | IRN | Behzad Karimi |
| — | | IRN | Mohsen Hanifi |

| No. | Pos. | Nation | Player |
|---|---|---|---|
| — | | IRN | Abass Khorasani |
| — | | IRN | Saeed Kozegar |
| — | | IRN | Rambod Alikhani |
| — | DF | IRN | Mehran Madanlou |
| — | | IRN | Seyed Mojtaba Mousavi |
| — | | IRN | Abass Naadalizadeh |
| — | | IRN | Reza Mohammadpour |
| — | | IRN | Mehdi Karimi |
| — | DF | IRN | Javad Norouzi |
| — | FW | IRN | Asghar Rameshgar |
| — | | IRN | Naser Rezaei |
| — | | IRN | Hadi Riahi |
| — | GK | IRN | Saeed Sattari |
| — | FW | IRN | Ehsan Shirmardi |
| — | | IRN | Hamed Soleimani |
| — | | IRN | Mehdi Vedadi |
