= 2013–14 Azadegan League =

23rd season of Azadegan League

Azadegan League
- Season: 2013–14
- Champions: Padideh; 1st Azadegan League title
- Promoted: Padideh; Naft Masjed Soleyman; Paykan
- Relegated: Shahrdari Yasouj; Alvand Hamedan; Gahar Zagros; Albadr Bandar Kong; Aboumoslem; Persepolis Shomal
- Matches played: 288
- Goals scored: 668 (2.32 per match)
- Top goalscorer: Mokhtar Jomehzadeh (15 goals)
- Biggest home win: Padideh 5–0 Gahar Zagros (30 March 2014); Paykan 5–0 Persepolis Shomal (8 April 2014)
- Biggest away win: Albadr Bandar Kong 0–3 Paykan (14 March 2014)
- Highest scoring: Naft Masjed Soleyman 4–3 Aboumoslem (14 March 2014); PAS Hamedan 5–2 Aboumoslem (8 April 2014)

The 2013–14 Azadegan League was the 23rd season of the Azadegan League and 13th as the second highest division since its establishment in 1991. The season featured 17 teams from the 2012–13 Azadegan League, four new teams relegated from the 2012–13 Persian Gulf Cup (Aluminium Hormozgan, Sanat Naft, Paykan and Gahar Zagros) and four new teams promoted from the 2012–13 2nd Division (Naft va Gaz Gachsaran and Siah Jamegan both as champions and Sanaye Giti Pasand and Albadr Bandar Kong). Padideh replaced Mes Sarcheshmeh. The league started on 22 September 2013 and ended on 8 April 2014. Padideh won the Azadegan League title for the first time in their history. Padideh, Naft Masjed Soleyman and Paykan won promotion to the Persian Gulf Pro League.

== Events ==
Locations of clubs in 2013–14 Azadegan League

=== Start of season ===
- The league was to feature four teams relegated from Iran Pro League in 2012–13; Aluminium Hormozgan, Sanat Naft, Paykan and Gahar Zagros.
- It featured four teams promoted from 2012–13 2nd Division: Naft Gachsaran, Giti Pasand, Siah Jamegan, and Badr Hormozgan.

=== Changes ===
- 2013–14 Azadegan League are the first season since 2008 that 26 teams will participate in the competition. In the previous season, 28 teams participated in the league.
- Padideh Shandiz bought Mes Sarcheshmeh and came to the Azadegan League.
- Sang Ahan withdrew from participating in football. Estilae Kavir bought their license. Estilae Kavir was sponsored By Yazd Louleh Company and changed the name to Yazd louleh.

=== Changes during the season ===
- In middle of season the name Albadr was changed to Badr and Mohammad Rouyanian bought license of Saipa Shomal and changed the name to Persepolis Shomal.

== Teams ==
=== Group A ===
Team	City	Venue	Capacity	Head Coach	Note
Alvand Hamedan	Hamedan	Qods	10,000	(Iran) Abdolrahim Kharazmi	
Esteghlal Ahvaz	Ahvaz	Takhti Ahvaz	30,000	(Iran) Davoud Mahabadi	
Foolad Yazd	Yazd	Nassiri	6,000	(Iran) Mehdi Dinvarzadeh	
Gahar	Dorood	Takhti Dorood	11,000	(Iran) Mohammad Ahmadzadeh	
Giti Pasand	Isfahan	Foolad Shahr	20,000	(Armenia) Samvel Darbinyan	
Gol Gohar	Sirjan	Imam Ali	2,000	(Iran) Ghasem Shahba	
Nassaji	Qa'em Shahr	Vatani	15,000	(Iran) Nader Dastneshan	
Nirooye Zamini	Tehran	Takhti Tehran	30,000	(Iran) Bahman Khoda Karam	
Padideh	Mashhad	Samen	35,000	(Iran) Akbar Misaghian	Replaced for Mes Sarcheshmeh
Sanat Naft	Abadan	Takhti Abadan	25,000	(Iran) Ebrahim Ghasempour	
Shahrdari Yasuj	Yasuj	Takhti Yasuj	5,000	(Iran) Javad Zarincheh	
Siah Jamegan	Mashhad	Samen	35,000	(Iran) Mohammadreza Mohajeri	
Shahrdari Bandar Abbas	Bandar Abbas	Takhti Bandar Abbas	10,000	(Iran) Hamidreza Farzaneh	

=== Group B ===
Team	City	Venue	Capacity	Head Coach	Note
Aboomoslem	Mashhad	Samen	35,000	(Iran) Ali Hanteh	
Aluminium	Bandar Abbas	Persian Gulf	20,000	(Iran) Majid Namjoo-Motlagh	
Albadr Bandar Kong	Bandar-e Kong	Takhti Bandar Langeh	5,000	(Iran) Fereydoun Hardani	
Iranjavan	Bushehr	Shahid Beheshti	15,000	(Iran) Gholamreza Delgarm	
Naft Gachsaran	Gachsaran	Naft Gachsaran	2,000	(Iran) Mohammad Hossein Ziaei	
Naft Masjed Soleyman	Masjed Soleyman	Takhti Ahvaz	30,000	(Iran) Behrouz Makvandi	
Mes Rafsanjan	Rafsanjan	Shohadaye Noushabad	10,000	(Croatia) Vinko Begović	Replaced for Mes Soongoun
Pas Hamedan	Hamedan	Qods	10,000	(Iran) Mohsen Ashouri	
Parseh Tehran	Tehran	Kargaran	5,000	(Iran) Alireza Emamifar	
Paykan	Tehran	Takhti Tehran	30,000	(Iran) Farhad Kazemi	
Persepolis Shomal	Qa'em Shahr	Shahid Vatani	10,000	(Iran) Ebrahim Talebi	Replaced for Saipa Shomal
Rahian Kermanshah	Kermanshah	Azadi	7,000	(Iran) Ahmad Sanjari	
Yazd Loleh	Yazd	Nassiri	6,000	(Iran) Mahmoud Amiri	Replaced for Sang Ahan Bafq

== Standings ==
=== Group A ===
Pos	Team	Pld	W	D	L	GF	GA	GD	Pts	Promotion or relegation
1	Padideh (C, P)	24	12	10	2	32	15	+17	46	2014–15 Iran Pro League
2	Siah Jamegan (Q)	24	12	9	3	27	17	+10	45	Azadegan League 2013–14 play-off
3	Nassaji Mazandaran	24	10	7	7	27	22	+5	37	
4	Sanat Naft	24	9	8	7	24	20	+4	35	
5	Giti Pasand	24	9	8	7	29	28	+1	35	
6	Sh. Bandar Abbas	24	9	6	9	23	21	+2	33	
7	Gol Gohar	24	8	8	8	29	22	+7	32	
8	Est. Ahvaz	24	7	10	7	27	29	−2	31	
9	Niroye Zamini	24	9	4	11	25	27	−2	31	
10	Foolad Yazd	24	6	11	7	20	18	+2	29	
11	Sh. Yasouj (R)	24	6	10	8	21	23	−2	28	Relegation to 2014–15 Iran Football's 2nd Division
12	Alvand Hamedan (R)	24	5	7	12	23	34	−11	22	Relegation to 2014–15 Iran Football's 2nd Division
13	Gahar Zagros (R)	24	2	6	16	15	46	−31	12	Relegation to 2014–15 Iran Football's 2nd Division

Updated to match(es) played on 8 April 2014. Source:
Rules for classification: 1) points; 2) goal difference; 3) number of goals scored.
(C) Champions; (P) Promoted; (Q) Qualified for the phase indicated; (R) Relegated

=== Group B ===
Pos	Team	Pld	W	D	L	GF	GA	GD	Pts	Promotion or relegation
1	Naft Masjed Soleyman (P)	24	12	7	5	31	22	+9	43	2014–15 Iran Pro League
2	Paykan (P, Q)	24	12	4	8	35	24	+11	40	Azadegan League 2013–14 play-off
3	Parseh Tehran	24	10	9	5	27	21	+6	39	
4	Iranjavan	24	9	11	4	29	21	+8	38	
5	Mes Rafsanjan	24	8	11	5	28	21	+7	35	
6	Aluminium Hormozgan	24	8	7	9	28	20	+8	31	
7	Naft va Gaz Gachsaran	24	7	10	7	28	27	+1	31	
8	Rahian Kermanshah	24	8	7	9	23	29	−6	31	
9	Pas	24	8	5	11	22	28	−6	29	
10	Yazd Loleh	24	6	10	8	21	21	0	28	
11	Albadr Bandar Kong (R)	24	9	4	11	21	30	−9	25 (Note: Badr Hormozgan were deducted 6 points due to their involvement in the last season's match-fixing scandal.)	Relegation to 2014–15 Iran Football's 2nd Division
12	Aboumoslem (R)	24	4	10	10	27	40	−13	22	Relegation to 2014–15 Iran Football's 2nd Division
13	Persepolis Shomal (R)	24	4	7	13	26	42	−16	19	Relegation to 2014–15 Iran Football's 2nd Division

Updated to match(es) played on 8 April 2014. Source:
Rules for classification: 1) points; 2) goal difference; 3) number of goals scored.
(P) Promoted; (Q) Qualified for the phase indicated; (R) Relegated

== Play-off ==
Team 1	Agg.	Team 2	1st leg	2nd leg
Paykan	3–1	Siah Jamegan	0–0	3–1 (a.e.t)

== Final ==
Team 1	Score	Team 2	Notes
Naft Masjed Soleyman	0–1	Padideh	

== Top scorers ==
=== Group A ===
Rank	Scorer	Club	Goals
1	(Iran) Mokhtar Jomehzadeh	Gol Gohar	15
2	(Iran) Amin Ghaseminejad	Giti Pasand	10
3	(Iran) Reza Taheri	Esteghlal Ahvaz	9
3	(Iran) Younes Shakeri	Padideh	9
4	(Iran) Ghasem Akbari	Alvand Hamedan	8

=== Group B ===
Rank	Player	Club	Goals
1	(Iran) Mehdi Taremi	Iranjavan	12
1	(Iran) Peyman Ranjbari	Naft Gachsaran	12
3	(Iran) Soheil Hezarjaribi	Persepolis Shomal	10
4	(Iran) Farshad Salarvand	Mes Rafsanjan	8
