= Mohammad Javad Molaei =

Iranian footballer (born 2000)

Personal information
- Full name: Mohammad Javad Molaie Kohnesara
- Date of birth: 8 October 2000 (age 26)
- Place of birth: Nowshahr, Iran
- Height: 1.75 m (5 ft 9 in)
- Position: Winger

Team information
- Current team: Oghab Tehran
- Number: 28

Youth career
- 2018–2019: Esteghlal

Senior career*
Years	Team	Apps	(Gls)
2019–2020	Baadraan	0	(0)
2020–2021	Tractor	1	(0)
2021–2023	Nassaji	9	(0)
2023	Saipa	4	(1)
2023–2024	Nirooye Zamini		
2024–	Oghab Tehran		
- * Club domestic league appearances and goals as of 10 May 2023

Mohammad Javad Molaei Kohnesara (Persian: محمدجواد ملای کهنه سرا; born 8 October 2000) is an Iranian footballer who plays as a winger for Oghab Tehran in the League 2.

== Club career ==
=== Nassaji ===
He made his debut for Nassaji Mazandaran in 1st fixtures of 2021–22 Persian Gulf Pro League against Fajr Sepasi while he substituted in for Masoud Shojaei.
