= Sanat Naft Novin Abadan F.C. =

Iranian football club

- Full name: Sanat Naft Novin Abadan Football Club
- Ground: Takhti Stadium; Abadan; Iran
- Head coach: Ali Firouzi
- League: Iran Football's 2nd Division
- Website: http://www.sanatenaft.com/
Home colours	Away colours

Sanat Naft Novin Abadan Football Club is an Iranian football club based in Abadan, Iran. They are the reserve side of Sanat Naft Abadan FC.

== Season-by-Season ==
The table below shows the achievements of the club in various competitions.

Season	League	Position	Hazfi Cup	Notes
2006–07	3rd Division	Second round
2007–08	3rd Division	Second round
2008–09	3rd Division			Promoted
2009–10	2nd Division	4th/D	Second Round
2010–11	2nd Division	9th/Group B	Did not qualify
2011–12	2nd Division	4th/Group B	Second Round
2012–13	2nd Division	5th/Group A
2013–14	2nd Division	4th/Group A
2014–15	2nd Division	4th/Group B
2015–16	2nd Division	5th/Group B

== First-team squad ==
As of Jun 29, 2016 Note: Flags indicate national team as defined under FIFA eligibility rules; some limited exceptions apply. Players may hold more than one non-FIFA nationality.

No.	Pos.	Nation	Player
1	GK	IRI	Peyman Nasirizadeh
2	DF	IRI	Ali Moghnemian
3	DF	IRI	Hossein Mokhtari
4	DF	IRI	Moein Rashedi
5	DF	IRI	Saman Raq
6	MF	IRI	Rahim Alboghobeish
7	MF	IRI	Morteza Davoudpour
10	FW	IRI	Mohammad Sarfaraz
11	MF	IRI	Rasoul Sa'diannia
12	DF	IRI	Soheil Abdellavi
13	DF	IRI	Habib Habibpour
14	MF	IRI	Mostafa Mehrabi
15	DF	IRI	Erfan Nassari
17	FW	IRI	Farshad Baharvand

No.	Pos.	Nation	Player
18	FW	IRI	Danial Salamieh
20	MF	IRI	Maki Sharifi
21	FW	IRI	Farhad Joudaki
22	GK	IRI	Raoul Bajelvand
23	MF	IRI	Reza Naqimesh
24	MF	IRI	Emad Mehdinasab
25	MF	IRI	Iman Naraghinezhad
33	GK	IRI	Shakib Hoveizavipour
—		IRI	Isa Soveiti
—		IRI	Mehdi Begri
—		IRI	Milad Ansari
—		IRI	Reza Boazar
—		IRI	Farhad Fathinejad

== See also ==
- 2011-12 Hazfi Cup
- 2011–12 Iran Football's 2nd Division
