= Golchin Robat Karim F.C. =

Iranian football club

Golchin Robat Karim Football Club is an Iranian football club based in Robat Karim, Iran. They competed in the 2010–11 Iran Football's 2nd Division.

In August, 2011 the license of the club in Iran Football's 2nd Division was bought by Siah Jamegan Khorasan.

Then the club will compete again in Iran Football's 3rd Division.

== Season by Season ==
The table below shows the achievements of the club in various competitions.

Season	League	Position	Hazfi Cup	Notes
2009–10	2nd Division	6th/Group A	Second Round
2010–11	2nd Division	11th/Group B	Did not qualify
2011–12	3rd Division

== See also ==
- 2011-12 Hazfi Cup
- 2011–12 Iran Football's 3rd Division
