= Mohammad Hosseini (footballer, born 2000) =

Iranian footballer (born 2000)

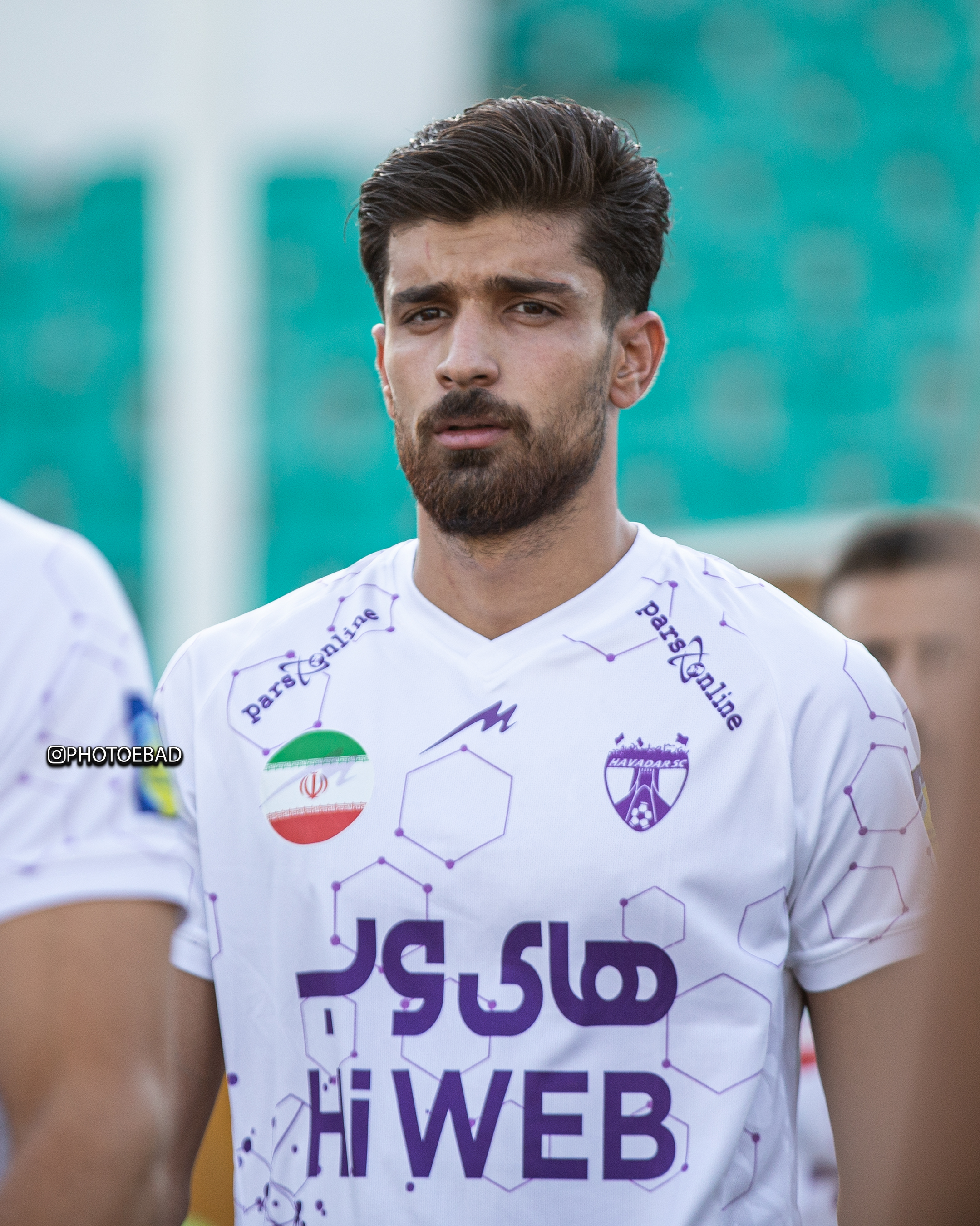

Personal information
- Date of birth: 2 March 2000 (age 26)
- Place of birth: Qom, Iran
- Height: 1.84 m (6 ft 0 in)
- Position: Midfielder

Youth career
- –2020: Persepolis

Senior career*
Years	Team	Apps	(Gls)
2020	Persepolis	0	(0)
2020–2022	Nirooye Zamini	4	(0)
2022–2023	Havadar	6	(0)
2023–2024	Saipa	17	(0)
2024–2025	Naft Masjed Soleyman	15	(0)
2025	Shahrdari Nowshahr	15	(1)
2025–2026	Mes Kerman	13	(2)
- * Club domestic league appearances and goals as of 22 April 2025

Mohammad Hosseini (Persian: محمد حسینی; born 2 March 2000) is a footballer who plays as a midfielder for Paykan in the Persian Gulf Pro League.

== Club career ==
Hosseini has a history of playing in the Persian Gulf Pro League with the teams of Persepolis and Havadar S.C.
