= Moghavemat Tehran F.C. =

Iranian football club

- Full name: Moghavemat Tehran Football Club
- Ground: Milad Nour Stadium; Tehran; Iran
- Manager: Mahdi Ghafari
- League: League 2

Moghavemat Tehran Football Club is an Iranian football club that is owned by the Basij and based in Tehran. They currently compete in League 2.

The club is known for developing youth players, who eventually are signed by clubs in the Persian Gulf Pro League.

== Season-by-season ==
The table below shows the achievements of the club in various competitions.

Season	League	Position	Hazfi Cup	Notes
2007–08	2nd Division	8th/Group A	First round
2008–09	2nd Division	3rd/Group C	First round
2009–10	2nd Division	3rd/Group A	Third Round
2010–11	2nd Division	3rd/Group A	Did not qualify
2011–12	2nd Division	3rd/Group A	Second Round
2012–13	2nd Division	11th/Group A	Did not qualify

== See also ==
- 2011-12 Hazfi Cup
- 2011–12 Iran Football's 2nd Division
