= Iran Football League Organization =

National sports association

- Formation: November 2, 2001
- Type: Sports association
- Headquarters: Tehran, Iran
- Region served: Iran
- President: Heydar Baharvand
- Main organ: General Assembly
- Website: www.iranleague.ir

The Iran Football League Organization is a national sports association responsible for administering the five professional football leagues in Iran - the Persian Gulf Pro League, Azadegan League, 2nd Division, 3rd Division and Kowsar Women Football league. The association also administers the Hazfi Cup, Iran's domestic cup competition. The organisation was founded in 2001.

== Competition ==
Name	Number of teams	Note
Persian Gulf Pro League	18 Teams	1st tier
Azadegan League	16 Teams	2nd tier
2nd Division	28 Teams in 2 Groups	3rd tier
3rd Division	36 Teams in 3 Groups	4th tier
4th Division	48 Teams in 4 Groups	5th tier
Kowsar Women Football league	12 Teams	1st tier
Hazfi Cup	+100 Teams	Knockout cup competition

== President ==
The president , along with the other members of the Executive Committee, is responsible for the day-to-day running of the organisation. The current president is Heydar Baharvand.

President	Term
Azizollah Mohammadi	2001 – 2012
Gholamreza Behravan (acting)	2012 – 2013
Mehdi Taj	2013 – 2016
Ali Kazemi (acting)	2016
Heydar Baharvand	2016 – 2022
Mohammad Reza Keshvari-Fard (acting)	2022 – 2023
Heydar Baharvand (second term)	2023 – present

== See also ==
- Iranian football league system
- Football Federation Islamic Republic of Iran
- Kurdistan Premier League
