= Soheil Haghshenas =

Iranian footballer

Personal information
- Full name: Mostafa Haghshenas
- Date of birth: 26 June 1982 (age 44)
- Place of birth: Rasht, Iran
- Position: Striker

Team information
- Current team: Sepidrood Rasht (Assistant coach)

Youth career
- Dokhaniat Gilan
- Sepidrood

Senior career*
Years	Team	Apps	(Gls)
1999–2017	Sepidrood	217	(61)
2006–2007	→ Pegah Gilan (loan)	18	(3)
2009–2010	→ Shahrdari Yasuj (loan)	23	(6)
Total		258	(70)

Managerial career
- 2017: Dokhaniat Rasht
- 2018–: Sepidroodt (assistant)
- 2019: Sepidrood (caretaker)
- * Club domestic league appearances and goals

Soheil Haghshenas (born 26 June 1982 in Rasht) is an Iranian footballer. He is currently as Assistant coach in Sepidrood Rasht. He played 14 years for Sepidrood in his career.

== Club career ==
He started his career with Sepidrood F.C. and played 3 seasons for the club and then joined Pegah Gilan, after Pegah was promoted to Pro League he left the club and joined Tarbiat Yazd but only trained with them for 2 months because he got accepted in the University of Guilan he decided to continue his school and joined Sepidrood once more.

Haghshenas was an important part of Sepidrood F.C. success during the 2009–2010 season and also won the 2nd division top goalscorer of the season after scoring 21 goals, He also became team's captain. In the next season he joined Azadegan League team Bargh Shiraz.
