= Hepco Arak F.C. =

Iranian football club

- Full name: Hepco Arak Football Club
- Ground: Imam Khomeini Stadium; Arak; Iran
- Owner: Heavy Equipment Production Company
- League: 3rd Division
- 2009–10: 8 (Group A)
Home colours

Hepco Arak Football Club is an Iranian football club based in Arak, Iran. They currently compete in the Iran Football's 3rd Division.

== Season-by-season ==
The table below chronicles the achievements of Hepco Arak F.C. in various competitions since 2009.

Season	League	Position	Hazfi Cup	Notes
2007–08	2nd Division	12th (Group A)
2008–09	2nd Division	7th (Group B)
2009–10	2nd Division	8th (Group A)	Second Round	Relegated
2010–11	3rd Division	6th/Group 3	Did not qualify

== Stadium ==
Hepko Arak play at Imam Khomeini Stadium which was built in 2007. The stadium sports a grass field with the capacity to hold 15000 people. spectators and is owned by the Iranian Physical Education organization.
