= 2009–10 Iran Football's 3rd Division =

Iran Football's 3rd Division
- Season: 2009–10
- Promoted: Zob Ahan Novin; Chooka Talesh; Naft Omidiyeh; Behzisti Hamedan; Goal Navad Qaem Shahr; Ariyana Gostar Kish
- Matches: 703
- Goals: 1,871 (2.66 per match)

The following is the standings of the 2009–10 Iran 3rd Division football season. This is the 4th rated football competition in Iran after the Azadegan League, Persian Gulf Cup and 2nd Division.

== League standings ==
=== Group A ===
Pos	Team	Pld	W	D	L	GF	GA	GD	Pts	Qualification or relegation
1	Chooka Talesh	22	12	6	4	36	22	+14	42	Promoted Second Round
2	Shahin Tehran	22	12	5	5	43	26	+17	41	Promoted Second Round
3	Sh. Lahijan	22	11	6	5	38	23	+15	39	
4	Entezam Tehran	22	11	5	6	40	27	+13	38	
5	Shams Khoy	22	10	4	8	23	24	−1	34	Relegation to Provincial Leagues
6	Oghab Naghadeh	22	10	3	9	28	26	+2	33	Relegation to Provincial Leagues
7	Sh. Astara	22	8	7	7	25	25	0	31	Relegation to Provincial Leagues
8	Sh. Novin Tabriz	22	9	3	10	32	27	+5	30	Relegation to Provincial Leagues
9	Sh. Shahr Qods	22	8	3	11	25	30	−5	27	Relegation to Provincial Leagues
10	Mokriyan Mahabad	22	6	5	11	22	41	−19	23	Relegation to Provincial Leagues
11	Setare Sorkh	22	5	3	14	24	41	−17	18	Relegation to Provincial Leagues
12	Motahed Ardebil	22	4	2	16	24	48	−24	14	Relegation to Provincial Leagues

Updated to match(es) played on 7 May 2010. Source:
Rules for classification: 1) points; 2) goal difference; 3) number of goals scored.

=== Group B ===
Pos	Team	Pld	W	D	L	GF	GA	GD	Pts	Qualification or relegation
1	Datis Lorestan	18	12	3	3	44	19	+25	39	Promoted Second Round
2	Behzisti Hamedan	18	11	1	6	40	19	+21	34	Promoted Second Round
3	Est. Hamedan	18	9	5	4	28	17	+11	32	
4	Arad Gharb	18	8	3	7	27	25	+2	27	
5	Farhad Rey	18	6	8	4	19	13	+6	26	Relegation to Provincial Leagues
6	Shahin Sanandaj	18	7	5	6	21	16	+5	26	Relegation to Provincial Leagues
7	Pirozi Kamyaran	18	7	2	9	18	27	−9	23	Relegation to Provincial Leagues
8	Vahdat Ashtiyan	18	6	3	9	22	35	−13	21	Relegation to Provincial Leagues
9	Shazand Markazi	18	6	2	10	18	29	−11	20	Relegation to Provincial Leagues
10	Rozname Bisoton	18	1	2	15	9	46	−37	5	Relegation to Provincial Leagues

Updated to match(es) played on 7 May 2010. Source:
Rules for classification: 1) points; 2) goal difference; 3) number of goals scored.

=== Group C ===
Pos	Team	Pld	W	D	L	GF	GA	GD	Pts	Qualification or relegation
1	Goal Navad	20	14	4	2	24	11	+13	46	Promoted Second Round
2	Sh. Behshahr	20	12	5	3	37	20	+17	41	Promoted Second Round
3	Atrak Petrochimi Bojnord	20	11	5	4	24	11	+13	38	
4	Sh. Noshahr	20	11	3	6	30	21	+9	36	
5	Payam Babol	20	9	7	4	39	24	+15	34	Relegation to Provincial Leagues
6	Sanat Mashhad	20	8	5	7	22	19	+3	29	Relegation to Provincial Leagues
7	Maharat Semnan	20	8	4	8	19	29	−10	28	Relegation to Provincial Leagues
8	Hemat Gonbad-e Kāvus	20	5	7	8	27	23	+4	22	Relegation to Provincial Leagues
9	Sadra Zirab	20	4	3	13	16	32	−16	15	Relegation to Provincial Leagues
10	Sepahan Tehran	20	2	3	15	15	37	−22	9	Relegation to Provincial Leagues
11	Milad Aliabad Golestan	20	1	4	15	15	41	−26	7	Relegation to Provincial Leagues

Updated to match(es) played on 7 May 2010. Source:
Rules for classification: 1) points; 2) goal difference; 3) number of goals scored.

=== Group D ===
Pos	Team	Pld	W	D	L	GF	GA	GD	Pts	Qualification or relegation
1	Zob Ahan Novin Isfahan	22	13	4	5	37	14	+23	43	Promoted Second Round
2	Sh. Hashtgerd	22	12	4	6	50	23	+27	40	Relegation to Provincial Leagues
3	Sh. Eslamshahr	22	12	4	6	48	22	+26	40	Promoted Second Round
4	Sh. Karaj	22	11	6	5	39	24	+15	39	
5	Moheban Ansar Shahriar	22	10	6	6	43	33	+10	36	
6	Fajr Kalhor Karaj	22	8	7	7	28	25	+3	31	Relegation to Provincial Leagues
7	Amir Kabir Kashan	22	7	8	7	26	32	−6	29	Relegation to Provincial Leagues
8	Naftoon Tehran	22	7	7	8	25	29	−4	28	Relegation to Provincial Leagues
9	Nirogah Isfahan	22	7	6	9	23	29	−6	27	Relegation to Provincial Leagues
10	Safir Abeyek Novin	22	6	5	11	24	56	−32	23	Relegation to Provincial Leagues
11	Eramsaz Qom	22	3	11	8	30	40	−10	20	Relegation to Provincial Leagues
12	Aria Sepahan Qom	22	0	4	18	10	56	−46	4	Relegation to Provincial Leagues

Updated to match(es) played on 7 May 2010. Source:
Rules for classification: 1) points; 2) goal difference; 3) number of goals scored.

=== Group E ===
Pos	Team	Pld	W	D	L	GF	GA	GD	Pts	Promotion or relegation
1	Mes Novin Kerman	18	11	4	3	29	9	+20	37	Promoted Second Round
2	Geranit Meybod Yazd	18	10	6	2	21	7	+14	36	Promoted Second Round
3	Sh. Kerman	18	8	5	5	22	15	+7	29	
4	Padegan 04 Birjand	18	8	3	7	20	21	−1	27	
5	Ahan Bafgh Yazd	18	6	8	4	23	15	+8	26	Relegation to Provincial Leagues
6	Sanaye Ardakan	18	6	8	4	17	10	+7	26	Relegation to Provincial Leagues
7	Trbiyat Bandar Abas	18	4	9	5	13	15	−2	21	Relegation to Provincial Leagues
8	Zogal Sang Kerman	18	4	5	9	18	28	−10	17	Relegation to Provincial Leagues
9	Sh. Bam	18	2	6	10	8	21	−13	12	Relegation to Provincial Leagues
10	Mehrvarzan Sistan	18	2	4	12	14	44	−30	10	Relegation to Provincial Leagues

Updated to match(es) played on 7 May 2010. Source:
Rules for classification: 1) points; 2) goal difference; 3) number of goals scored.

=== Group F ===
Pos	Team	Pld	W	D	L	GF	GA	GD	Pts	Qualification or relegation
1	Naft Omidiyeh	20	15	4	1	41	6	+35	49	Promoted Second Round
2	Ariyana Gostar Kish	20	10	8	2	32	19	+13	38	Promoted Second Round
3	Hafari Ahvaz	20	11	5	4	32	19	+13	38	
4	Kargar Boneh Gez	20	10	3	7	32	22	+10	33	
5	Gaz Jam Bushehr	20	7	7	6	34	24	+10	28	Relegation to Provincial Leagues
6	Ashayer Nurabad	20	7	6	7	26	26	0	27	Relegation to Provincial Leagues
7	Pirozi Hilal e Ahmar	20	7	5	8	27	30	−3	26	Relegation to Provincial Leagues
8	Khalij Fars Marvdasht	20	6	7	7	19	19	0	25	Relegation to Provincial Leagues
9	Oghab Shiraz	20	5	4	11	20	33	−13	19	Relegation to Provincial Leagues
10	Est. Charam	20	2	6	12	18	52	−34	12	Relegation to Provincial Leagues
11	Jahan Gostar	20	2	1	17	22	53	−31	7	Relegation to Provincial Leagues

Updated to match(es) played on 7 May 2010. Source:
Rules for classification: 1) points; 2) goal difference; 3) number of goals scored.

== Second round ==
=== Group A ===
Pos	Team	Pld	W	D	L	GF	GA	GD	Pts	Promotion
1	Chooka Talesh	6	2	3	1	13	8	+5	9	Promoted to 2nd Division 2010–11
2	Behzisti Hamedan	6	2	3	1	13	16	−3	9	Promoted to 2nd Division 2010–11
3	Datis Lorestan	6	1	3	2	11	12	−1	6	
4	Shahin Tehran	6	0	5	1	8	9	−1	5	

Updated to match(es) played on 27 May 2010. Source:
Rules for classification: 1) points; 2) goal difference; 3) number of goals scored.

Chooka Talesh and Behzisti Hamedan Promoted to the 2nd Division

=== Group B ===
Pos	Team	Pld	W	D	L	GF	GA	GD	Pts	Promotion
1	Zob Ahan Novin Isfahan	6	3	2	1	12	5	+7	11	Promoted to 2nd Division 2010–11
2	Goal Navad	6	2	2	2	12	9	+3	8	Promoted to 2nd Division 2010–11
3	Sh. Behshahr	6	2	2	2	9	11	−2	8	
4	Sh. Eslamshahr	6	1	2	3	5	13	−8	5	

Updated to match(es) played on 28 May 2010. Source:
Rules for classification: 1) points; 2) goal difference; 3) number of goals scored.

Zob Ahan Novin Isfahan and Goal Navad Qa'em Shahr Promoted to the 2nd Division

=== Group C ===
Pos	Team	Pld	W	D	L	GF	GA	GD	Pts	Promotion
1	Naft Omidiyeh	6	2	3	1	5	5	0	9	Promoted to 2nd Division 2010–11
2	Ariyana Gostar Kish	6	2	2	2	9	9	0	8	Promoted to 2nd Division 2010–11
3	Geranit Meybod Yazd	6	2	2	2	9	11	−2	8	
4	Mes Novin Kerman	6	2	1	3	10	8	+2	7	

Updated to match(es) played on 28 May 2010. Source:
Rules for classification: 1) points; 2) goal difference; 3) number of goals scored.

Naft Omidiyeh and Ariyana Gostar Kish Promoted to the 2nd Division

== Final league standing ==
The championship round was played by the participation of the winners of groups A, B, and C.

Zob Ahan Novin Isfahan was chosen as the host of the matches.

Pos	Team	Pld	W	D	L	GF	GA	GD	Pts	Result
1	Zob Ahan Novin Isfahan	2	2	0	0	5	2	+3	6	Champion
2	Naft Omidiyeh	2	1	0	1	4	4	0	3	Runner-up
3	Chooka Talesh	2	0	0	2	1	4	−3	0	Third place

Updated to match(es) played on 4 June 2011. Source:
Rules for classification: 1) points; 2) goal difference; 3) number of goals scored.
