= Abbas Asgari =

Iranian footballer

Personal information
- Date of birth: 11 September 1990 (age 36)
- Place of birth: Masjed Soleyman, Iran
- Height: 1.75 m (5 ft 9 in)
- Position: Forward

Team information
- Current team: Naft Masjed Soleyman
- Number: 10

Youth career
- Naft Masjed Soleyman

Senior career*
Years	Team	Apps	(Gls)
2008–2015	Naft Masjed Soleyman		
2015–2016	Nirooye Zamini		
2016–2017	Siah Jamegan	22	(3)
2017–2021	Naft Masjed Soleyman	42	(4)
2021–2023	Shams Azar	23	(9)
2023–	Naft Masjed Soleyman	18	(5)
- * Club domestic league appearances and goals as of 30 October 2025

Abbas Asgari (Persian: عباس عسگری; born 11 September 1990) is an Iranian football forward who plays for Naft Masjed Soleyman in the Azadegan League.
