= Kowsar Lorestan F.C. =

Iranian football club

Kowsar Lorestan کوثر لرستان
- Full name: Kowsar Lorestan Football Club
- Founded: 2008
- Ground: Takhti Khoramabad; Khoramabad, Iran
- Capacity: 20,000
- Chairman: (Iran) Gholamreza Ayatollahzadeh
- Head Coach: (Iran) Mostafa Ghanbarpour
- League: 2nd Division
- 2009–10: Azadegan League Group 2, 14th (Relegated)
Home colours	Away colours

Kowsar Lorestan Football Club (Persian:کوثر لرستان) is an Iranian club based in Khoramabad, Lorestan Province. They play their home matches in the 20,000 seater stadium Takhti Kohramabad.

== Season-by-season ==
The table below chronicles the achievements of Kowsar in various competitions since 2006.

Season	League	Position	Hazfi Cup	Notes
2006–07	Azadegan League	10th	Second Round
2007–08	Azadegan League	9th	First Round
2008–09	Azadegan League	8th	First Round
2009–10	Azadegan League	14th	Second Round	Relegated
2010–11	2nd Division	15th/Group B	Did not qualify

== Players ==
As of February 12, 2010

== First-team squad ==
Note: Flags indicate national team as defined under FIFA eligibility rules; some limited exceptions apply. Players may hold more than one non-FIFA nationality.

No.	Pos.	Nation	Player
15	DF	(Nigeria) NGA	Dominic Okata
—	GK	(Iran) IRN	Asghar Karamollahi
—		(Iran) IRN	Mohammad Rayat
—	MF	(Iran) IRN	Moslem Mohammadnejad
—		(Iran) IRN	Amir Sadeghi
—		(Iran) IRN	Arash Hassanpour
—	MF	(Iran) IRN	Hadi Daghagheleh
—		(Iran) IRN	Mohammad Azmoodeh
—	MF	(Iran) IRN	Mehrdad Daghagheleh
—		(Iran) IRN	Morteza Heydari
—		(Iran) IRN	Farzad Hamidi
—		(Iran) IRN	Khaled Shafiei
—	MF	(Iran) IRN	Mehdi Ashrafi

No.	Pos.	Nation	Player
—		(Iran) IRN	Sina Moradi
—		(Iran) IRN	Esmaeil Babajani
—	MF	(Iran) IRN	Mohsen Soltani
—		(Iran) IRN	Rasoul Sattarpour
—	DF	(Iran) IRN	Morteza Falahati
—		(Iran) IRN	Mehdi Mohhamadkargar
—	MF	(Iran) IRN	Ali Tahmasebi
—	MF	(Iran) IRN	Mohammad Ali Bazgeer
—		(Iran) IRN	Mohammad Ayatollahzadeh
—		(Iran) IRN	Farid Goudarzi
—	MF	(Iran) IRN	Mehrdad Khademi (Captain)
—	GK	(Iran) IRN	Payman Shamlou
—	MF	(Iran) IRN	Hamid Mirdarikvand

For recent transfers, see List of Iranian football transfers, summer 2010.

== Club managers ==
- (Iran) Mostafa Ghanbarpour (June 2008 – Nov 08)
- (Iran) Majid Bagheriniya (Nov 2008 – June 9)
- (Iran) Reza Ahadi (June 2009 – Oct 09)
- (Iran) Mostafa Ghanbarpour (Oct 2009–)

== See also ==
- Hazfi Cup
