= Zob Ahan Novin Isfahan F.C. =

Iranian football club

Zob Ahan Novin Isfahan Football Club is an Iranian football club based in Isfahan, Iran. They are the reserve team of Zob Ahan, and competed in the 2011–12 Iran Football's 2nd Division.

== Season-by-Season ==
The table below shows the achievements of the club in various competitions.

Season	League	Position	Hazfi Cup	Notes
2010–11	2nd Division	10th/Group B	Did not qualify
2011–12	2nd Division		2nd Round

== See also ==
- 2011-12 Hazfi Cup
- 2011–12 Iran Football's 2nd Division
