= Payam Mokhaberat Shiraz F.C. =

Iranian football club

Payam Mokhaberat F.C.
- Full name: Payam Mokhaberat Shiraz Football Club
- Founded: 2000; 17 years ago
- Ground: Hafezieh Stadium; Shiraz, Iran
- Capacity: 20,000
- Chairman: (Iran) Jafar Soltani
- Manager: (Iran) Asghar Akbari
- League: Azadegan League
- 2009–10: Azadegan League Group 1, 12th
Home colours	Away colours

Payam Mokhaberat Football Club is an Iranian football club based in Shiraz, Iran. They currently compete in the Azadegan League.

== Season-by-Season ==
The table below chronicles the achievements of Payam Mokhaberat Shiraz in various competitions since 2005.

Season	League	Position	Hazfi Cup	Notes
2005–06	2nd Division	3rd	First round
2006–07	2nd Division	7th	Did not Qualify
2007–08	2nd Division	1st	Did not Qualify	Promoted
2008–09	Azadegan League	8th	Second Round
2009–10	Azadegan League	12th	Third Round
2010–11	Azadegan League	10th	Second Round
2011–12	Azadegan League	14th	1/16 Final

== Head coaches ==
- (Iran) Jamshid Ghadiri (2005 – Jun 09)
- (Iran) Mehrdad Shekari (Jun 2009 – Dec 09)
- (Iran) Jafar Fatahi (Dec 2009 – Jan 10)
- (Iran) Mohammad Abbassi (Jan 2010– Jan 2011)
- (Iran) Asghar Akbari (Jan 2011)

== Players ==
=== First Team Squad ===
As of March 1, 2012

Note: Flags indicate national team as defined under FIFA eligibility rules; some limited exceptions apply. Players may hold more than one non-FIFA nationality.

No.	Pos.	Nation	Player
—	GK	IRN	Ali Asadi
—		IRN	Ahmad Amini Far
—		IRN	Samad Asgari
—	MF	IRN	Saeed Hosseini
—		IRN	Bahman Dastani
—	MF	IRN	Meysam Farahmandian
—		IRN	Mohsen Razmpoosh
—		IRN	Ali Joukar
—		IRN	Hadi Moradi
—		IRN	Mohammad Sohrabi

No.	Pos.	Nation	Player
—		IRN	Saeed Nasiri
—	FW	CRO	Marin Prpić
—		IRN	Khosro Rashidi
—	MF	IRN	Hamidreza Farahnak
—		IRN	Farzad Rezaei
—	MF	IRN	Morteza Golshan
—		IRN	Javad Shabani
—		IRN	Mohammad Javad Shahdaei
—	MF	IRN	Kamran Shayesteh
—		IRN	Farzin Zare

For recent transfers, see List of Iranian football transfers, summer 2010.
