= Esteghlal Jonoub Tehran S.C. =

Iranian football club

Esteghlal Jonoub
- Full name: Esteghlal Jonoub Tehran Cultural and Sport Club
- Founded: 1990; 2021 (reactivated)
- Ground: Esteghlal Jonoub Stadium
- Chairman: Esmail Sarhangiyan
- League: League 3
- 2015–16: League 3 Group B, 3rd
- Website: Official website
Home colours	Away colours

Esteghlal Jonoub Tehran Sport Club (Persian: باشگاه فرهنگی ورزشی استقلال جنوب تهران), commonly known as Esteghlal Jonoub, is a sports club based in Tehran, Iran. The club is known for their football team. The club was founded in 1990.

== History ==
=== Establishment ===
Founded in 1990 by fans of Esteghlal Tehran, Esteghlal Jonoub Tehran SC was officially registered in 2000. Besides football the club also consists of various other departments including athletics, basketball, handball, table tennis, volleyball, taekwondo, weightlifting and wrestling.

=== League 2 ===
Between 2007 and 2011 Esteghlal Jonoub played in League 2, formerly known as Iran Football's 2nd Division. In 2011 Esteghlal Jonoub were promoted to the Azadegan League. They finished 1st of Group B in 2010–11 Iran Football's 2nd Division. However, in August 2011 the license of the club in the Azadegan League was bought by Esteghlal Khuzestan.

=== League 3 ===
After Esteghlal Khuzestan bought the license of Esteghlal Jonoub, the club was offset in 2011–12 Iran Football's 3rd Division. They finished 3rd of Group 3 in that season.

== Dissolution ==
On July 19, 2018, the club was sold and named Pesepolis Pakdasht.

== Stadium ==
Esteghlal Jonoub plays their home games at their own Esteghlal Jonoub Stadium which is located in the Shahid Rajaei Street. The stadium has an artificial turf.

== Season-by-season ==
The table below chronicles the achievements of Esteghlal Jonoub in various competitions since 2007.

Season	Division	League	Position	Hazfi Cup	Notes
2007–08	3	League 2	6th of Group A	2nd Round
2008–09	3	League 2	3rd of Group B	2nd Round
2009–10	3	League 2	3rd of Group A	1st Round
2010–11	3	League 2	1st of Group B	Did not enter	Replaced
2011–12	4	League 3	3rd of Group 3	Did not enter
2012–13	4	League 3	3rd of Group 4	Did not enter
2013–14	4	League 3	4th of Group 1	Did not enter
2014–15	4	League 3	4th of Group A	Did not enter
2015–16	4	League 3	3rd of Group B	Did not enter

== See also ==
- 2015–16 Iran Football's 3rd Division
- Esteghlal Tehran
- Esteghlal Khuzestan
