= Damash Tehran =

Iranian football club

Damash Tehran داماش تهران
- Full name: Damash Tehran Football Club
- Founded: 2008; 17 years ago
- Ground: Kargaran
- Capacity: 5,000
- Chairman: abass alizade
- Head Coach: saman karami
- League: Tehran Province League
- 2018–19: 3rd Division, 9th
Home colours	Away colours

Damash Tehran Football Club (Persian: باشگاه فوتبال داماش تهران), commonly known as Damash Tehran, is an Iranian football club based in capital Tehran, that competes in the Tehran Province League. The club was founded in 2008 and previously known as Parseh Tehran Football Club (Persian: باشگاه فوتبال پارسه تهران) between 2011 and 2016.

Since the beginning of the 2011–12 season, Damash Tehran has played its home games at the Kargaran which has a capacity of 5,000.

== History ==
=== Damash ===
Club was formed by Arya Investment Company and named Damash in 2008. The club participated in different competition since 2008–09 Iranian football season with the names of Damash Tehran and Damash Karaj.

=== Parseh Tehran ===
After its promotion to the Azadegan League in 2011, the club change its name to Parseh Tehran. The club was sold to Tehran-based businessman Kaveh Abedini in 2011. Kaveh Abedini is a businessman in Tehran. In the 2013–2014 Azadegan League season the club almost achieved a promotion to the Iran Pro League where they finished third, one point behind second placed Paykan.

== Season-by-season ==
The table below shows the achievements of the club in various competitions.

Season	League	Position	Hazfi Cup	Notes
2008–09	2nd Division	Group B/5th	Did not qualify
2009–10	2nd Division	Group D/7th	1st Round
2010–11	2nd Division	Group A/2nd	Did not qualify	Promoted
2011–12	Azadegan League	Group A/11th	2nd Round
2012–13	Azadegan League	Group A/9th	1/16 Final
2013–14	Azadegan League	Group B/3rd	1/16 Final
2014–15	Azadegan League	Group B/4th	1/16 Final
2015–16	Azadegan League	14th	Did not enter

== Club managers ==
- Mehdi Pashazadeh (2012)
- Alireza Emamifar (2012–2014)
- Hamlet Mkhitaryan (2016)

== See also ==
- Damash Gilan
- Gahar Zagros
