= Sanat Gaz Sarakhs F.C. =

Iranian football club

- Full name: Sanat Gaz Sarakhs Club
- Founded: December 22, 2005
- Ground: Takhti Sarakhs; Sarakhs; Iran
- League: Second Division
Home colours

Sanat Gaz Sarakhs Football Club is an Iranian football club based in Sarakhs, Iran. The club is owned by National Iranian Oil Company, based in Khangiran, Razavi Khorasan Province and was founded on December 22, 2005.

== Khorasani Duel ==
As part of Hazfi Cup, on November 26, 2009, Sanat Gaz faced rival fellow Khorasani team Payam Mashhad F.C. in a game that became known as "Duel of Khorasan" by journalists., the game was played in Takhti Stadium, Mashhad and won by Payam. Hamid Marvi scored the winning goal in 20th minute from the penalty spot and thus Sanat Gaz was eliminated from progressing further in the competition. The game was very physical, two players were red carded, while six other received yellow cards

== Head coaches ==
- ...
- (Iran) Ramezan Shokri (c.2009)
- (Iran) Majid Hosseinipour (?-November 2010)
- (Iran) Reza Sahebi (November 2010–? 2011)

== Season-by-Season ==
The table below shows the achievements of the club in various competitions.

Season	League	Position	Hazfi Cup	Notes
2009–10	2nd Division	2nd (Group D)	Second Round
2010–11	2nd Division	15th/Group A	Did not qualify

== See also ==
- Hazfi Cup
