= 2009–10 Iran 2nd Division =

Iran Football's 2nd Division
- Season: 2009–10
- Promoted: Sepidrood Rasht; Shahrdari Yasuj; Naft Masjed Soleyman; Foolad Yazd
- Relegated: Palayesh Gaz Ilam; Hepco Arak; Aria Sepahan Qom; Persepolis Bojnord; Persepolis Zahedan; Armin Tehran; Eftekhar Birjand; Kheybar Khoramabad; Shahrdari Mahshahr; Sanat Ard Golestan
- Matches: 320
- Goals: 765 (2.39 per match)
- Top goalscorer: 21 Goals Soheil Haghshenas

The following were the standings of the 2009–10 2nd Division football season. This is in fact the third tier of the Iranian football league system after the Azadegan League and Persian Gulf Cup.

It will be divided into two phases: the regular season, played from October 2009 to March 2010, and the Second round from March to June 2010.

The league will also be composed of 36 teams divided into four divisions of 9 teams each, whose teams will be divided geographically. Teams will play only other teams in their own division, once at home and once away for a total of 16 matches each.

In each division, two teams are promoted to Second round, and two teams are relegated to 2nd Division and plus one relegation playoff losers from each division will be relegated to 3rd Division. In Second round, in each division two teams are promoted to Azadegan League. In total, the league promotes 4 teams to Azadegan League and relegates 10 teams to 3rd Division.

== League standings ==
=== Group A ===
Locations of clubs in 2009–10 Iran Football's 2nd Division/Group A

Pos	Team	Pld	W	D	L	GF	GA	GD	Pts	Qualification or relegation
1	Foolad Yazd	16	10	5	1	23	8	+15	35	Promoted Second Round
2	Sepidrood	16	9	2	5	34	15	+19	29	Promoted Second Round
3	Moghavemat Tehran	16	6	7	3	23	14	+9	25	
4	Machine Sazi	16	4	8	4	22	19	+3	20	
5	Zob Ahan Ardabil	16	5	4	7	23	28	−5	19	
6	Golchin	16	3	9	4	14	23	−9	18	
7	Palayesh Gaz	16	4	5	7	14	24	−10	17	Relegation Play Off
8	Hepco	16	3	7	6	18	27	−9	16	Relegation to 2010–11 3rd Division
9	Ariya	16	2	5	9	11	24	−13	11	Relegation to 2010–11 3rd Division

Updated to match(es) played on 21 March 2010. Source:
Rules for classification: 1) points; 2) goal difference; 3) number of goals scored.

Home \ Away	ARI	FOY	GOL	HEP	MST	MOT	GAZ	SEP	ZOB
Ariya		0–1	2–1	1–1	0–0	0–3	1–0	1–3	1–3
Foolad Yazd	0–0		3–1	2–0	1–0	1–0	4–1	3–0	1–0
Golchin	1–0	0–0		2–2	0–0	0–0	2–2	0–0	2–1
Hepco	2–2	0–1	1–2		2–2	1–0	1–1	2–1	1–3
Machine Sazi	3–2	1–1	1–0	1–1		1–1	5–0	2–1	3–2
Moghavemat Tehran	3–0	1–1	5–0	1–1	2–2		1–0	1–0	1–1
Palayesh Gaz	0–0	1–0	1–1	3–1	1–0	0–1		1–0	1–3
Sepidrood	2–1	1–1	4–0	5–0	3–1	4–1	2–0		5–1
Zob Ahan Ardabil	1–0	0–1	1–1	0–2	1–0	2–2	2–2	0–3	

Updated to match(es) played on 21 May 2010. Source:
Legend: Blue = home team win; Yellow = draw; Red = away team win.

=== Group B ===
Locations of clubs in 2009–10 Iran Football's 2nd Division/Group B

Pos	Team	Pld	W	D	L	GF	GA	GD	Pts	Qualification or relegation
1	Sh. Yasouj	16	10	4	2	23	10	+13	34	Promoted Second Round
2	Naft Masjed Soleyman	16	9	4	3	25	11	+14	31	Promoted Second Round
3	Niroye Zamini	16	7	7	2	19	12	+7	28	
4	Sh. Langarud	16	7	3	6	25	18	+7	24	
5	Naft va Gaz Gachsaran	16	5	5	6	18	22	−4	20	
6	Per. Ganaveh	16	6	2	8	16	21	−5	20	
7	Nozhan	16	4	6	6	18	20	−2	18	Relegation Play Off
8	Per. Bojnord	16	1	8	7	11	28	−17	11	Relegation to 2010–11 3rd Division
9	Per. Zahedan	16	3	1	12	13	26	−13	10	Relegation to 2010–11 3rd Division

Updated to match(es) played on 21 March 2010. Source:
Rules for classification: 1) points; 2) goal difference; 3) number of goals scored.

Home \ Away	NFT	NFG	NRO	NOZ	PRB	PRG	PRZ	SHL	SHY
Naft Masjed Soleyman		2–0	1–1	3–0	2–0	3–0	3–0	2–1	1–0
Naft va Gaz Gachsaran	4–2		1–1	1–1	4–1	1–0	2–0	1–0	0–1
Niroye Zamini	3–1	0–0		2–1	1–1	1–0	1–1	1–0	2–2
Nozhan	0–0	3–0	1–1		2–1	0–1	2–0	1–3	1–2
Per. Bojnord	0–2	0–0	0–1	1–1		1–0	4–0	2–2	0–2
Per. Ganaveh	2–1	1–0	0–3	2–4	0–0		2–1	2–0	2–2
Per. Zahedan	0–2	2–2	0–1	1–1	4–0	0–0		1–0	1–1
Sh. Langarud	0–0	7–2	1–0	0–0	2–1	3–1	3–1		1–0
Sh. Yasouj	0–0	1–0	2–0	2–0	3–0 (Note: Persepolis Bojnord received a technical loss of 3–0 to Shahrdari Yasuj. The original game was 0–0 up to 75 minutes.)	1–1	1–0	2–1	

Updated to match(es) played on 21 May 2010. Source:
Legend: Blue = home team win; Yellow = draw; Red = away team win.

=== Group C ===
Locations of clubs in 2009–10 Iran Football's 2nd Division/Group C

Pos	Team	Pld	W	D	L	GF	GA	GD	Pts	Qualification or relegation
1	Est. Jonub	16	7	5	4	18	14	+4	26	Promoted Second Round
2	Sh. Bandar Anzali	16	7	5	4	25	22	+3	26	Promoted Second Round
3	Moghavemat Sari	16	7	4	5	22	19	+3	25	
4	Sh. Zanjan	16	7	3	6	21	20	+1	24	
5	Sh. Shahrekord	16	6	3	7	13	16	−3	21	
6	Sh. Hamedan	16	5	5	6	27	27	0	20	
7	Armin	16	6	2	8	15	16	−1	20	Relegation Play Off
8	Eftekhar	16	5	4	7	17	17	0	19	Relegation to 2010–11 3rd Division
9	Kheybar	16	4	5	7	14	21	−7	17	Relegation to 2010–11 3rd Division

Updated to match(es) played on 21 March 2010. Source:
Rules for classification: 1) points; 2) goal difference; 3) number of goals scored.

Home \ Away	ARM	EFT	ESJ	KHY	MOS	SHB	SHH	SHS	SHZ
Armin		1–0	0–1	2–1	1–1	3–0	0–2	2–0	3–1
Eftekhar	0–1		1–1	0–0	2–2	1–1	2–0	1–0	2–4
Est. Jonub	0–0	1–0		0–0	3–2	2–0	1–1	2–1	0–2
Kheybar	1–0	2–1	0–1		0–1	1–1	3–2	0–0	2–1
Moghavemat Sari	1–0	1–0	3–2	2–0		2–2	4–1	1–0	0–0
Sh. Bandar Anzali	3–1	2–0	2–0	1–1	2–1		3–1	2–1	2–1
Sh. Hamedan	2–1	0–2	1–1	5–2	3–1	3–3		2–0	0–1
Sh. Shahrekord	1–0	0–3	1–0	2–1	2–0	1–0	1–1		1–1
Sh. Zanjan	2–0	0–2	0–3	2–0	1–0	3–1	2–2	0–2	

Updated to match(es) played on 21 May 2010. Source:
Legend: Blue = home team win; Yellow = draw; Red = away team win.

=== Group D ===
Locations of clubs in 2009–10 Iran Football's 2nd Division/Group D

Pos	Team	Pld	W	D	L	GF	GA	GD	Pts	Qualification or relegation
1	Homa	16	7	7	2	21	14	+7	28	Promoted Second Round
2	Sanat Gaz	16	5	9	2	18	13	+5	24	Promoted Second Round
3	Est. Qazvin	16	6	5	5	13	11	+2	23	
4	Sanat Naft Novin	16	6	5	5	12	15	−3	23	
5	Saipa Shomal	16	5	6	5	22	15	+7	21	
6	Per. Borazjan	16	5	6	5	19	19	0	21	
7	Damash Tehran	16	4	8	4	19	20	−1	20	Relegation Play Off
8	Sh. Mahshahr	16	4	8	4	13	16	−3	20	Relegation to 2010–11 3rd Division
9	Ard	16	1	4	11	13	27	−14	7	Relegation to 2010–11 3rd Division

Updated to match(es) played on 21 March 2010. Source:
Rules for classification: 1) points; 2) goal difference; 3) number of goals scored.

Home \ Away	ARD	DAM	ESQ	HOM	PRB	SAI	SGS	SNN	SHM
Ard		0–1	0–1	0–2	4–1	2–2	1–2	1–1	1–2
Damash Tehran	0–0		2–1	1–1	2–4	0–0	0–0	2–0	2–1
Est. Qazvin	1–0	1–0		1–1	1–1	3–1	0–0	2–0	1–1
Homa	2–1	1–1	1–0		3–1	1–1	1–1	0–1	2–0
Per. Borazjan	3–0 (Note: Ard Golestan received a technical loss of 3–0 to Persepolis Borazjan.)	1–2	1–0	0–0		1–0	1–3	2–0	0–0
Saipa Shomal	3–1	1–0	0–1	1–2	1–1		3–0 (Note: Sanat Gaz Sarakhs received a technical loss of 3–0 to Saipa Shomal. The original game was 2–1 up to 70 minutes.)	5–0	2–0
Sanat Gaz	2–2	2–2	2–0	1–1	0–0	0–0		0–0	3–0
Sanat Naft Novin	3–0 (Note: Ard Golestan received a technical loss of 3–0 to Sanat Naft Novin)	3–2	1–0	0–1	3–2	2–1	0–1		1–1
Sh. Mahshahr	1–0	2–2	0–0	3–1	0–0	1–1	1–0	0–0	

Updated to match(es) played on 21 May 2010. Source:
Legend: Blue = home team win; Yellow = draw; Red = away team win.

== Second round ==
=== Group A ===
Pos	Team	Pld	W	D	L	GF	GA	GD	Pts	Promotion
1	Sepidrood	6	4	1	1	14	6	+8	13	Promoted to the Azadegan League
2	Sh. Yasouj	6	4	0	2	14	10	+4	12	Promoted to the Azadegan League
3	Est. Jonub	6	1	2	3	5	12	−7	5	
4	Sanat Gaz	6	1	1	4	4	9	−5	4	

Updated to match(es) played on 21 May 2010. Source:
Rules for classification: 1) points; 2) goal difference; 3) number of goals scored.

Home \ Away	ESJ	SGS	SEP	SHY
Est. Jonub		0–0	0–3	3–2
Sanat Gaz	4–0		0–2	0–1
Sepidrood	1–1	2–0		4–1
Sh. Yasouj	2–1	4–0	4–2	

Updated to match(es) played on 21 May 2010. Source:
Legend: Blue = home team win; Yellow = draw; Red = away team win.

=== Group B ===
Pos	Team	Pld	W	D	L	GF	GA	GD	Pts	Promotion
1	Naft Masjed Soleyman	6	4	0	2	12	5	+7	12	Promoted to the Azadegan League
2	Foolad Yazd	6	2	3	1	8	6	+2	9	Promoted to the Azadegan League
3	Homa	6	2	2	2	6	7	−1	8	
4	Sh. Bandar Anzali	6	1	1	4	4	12	−8	4	

Updated to match(es) played on 21 May 2010. Source:
Rules for classification: 1) points; 2) goal difference; 3) number of goals scored.

Home \ Away	FOY	HOM	SHB	NFT
Foolad Yazd		1–1	2–1	3–1
Homa	1–1		1–0	2–1
Sh. Bandar Anzali	1–1	2–1		0–6
Naft Masjed Soleyman	1–0	2–0	1–0	

Updated to match(es) played on 21 May 2010. Source:
Legend: Blue = home team win; Yellow = draw; Red = away team win.

== Third Round ==
=== Championship final ===
First leg to be played May 28, 2010; return leg to be played June 3, 2010

Team 1	Agg.	Team 2	1st leg	2nd leg
Sepidrood Rasht	1-1 (4-3)penalty kick	Naft Masjed Soleyman	0-1	1-0

=== Third place play-off ===
First leg to be played May 28, 2010; return leg to be played June 3, 2010

Team 1	Agg.	Team 2	1st leg	2nd leg
Shahrdari Yasuj	6-4	Foolad Yazd	5-2	1-2

== Relegation play-off ==
First leg to be played April 13, 2010; return leg to be played April 20, 2010

Team 1	Agg.	Team 2	1st leg	2nd leg
Nozhan Sari	6-2	Palayesh Gaz Ilam	5-1	1-1

(R)Palayesh Gaz Ilam Relegated to 3rd Division.

First leg to be played April 13, 2010; return leg to be played April 20, 2010

Team 1	Agg.	Team 2	1st leg	2nd leg
Armin Tehran	2-4	Damash Tehran	1-3	1-1

(R)Armin Tehran Relegated to 3rd Division.

== Player statistics ==
=== Top goalscorer ===
21 goals

- (Iran) Soheil Haghshenas (Sepidrood)
