= Shahid Nassiri Stadium =

Football stadium in Yazd, Iran

Coordinates: 31.8585°N 54.3288°E

Nassiri Stadium
- Interactive map of Nassiri Stadium
- Full name: Shahid Nassiri Stadium
- Location: Yazd, Iran
- Operator: Ministry of Sport and Youth
- Capacity: 11,365 (football)
- Surface: Grass

Construction
- Opened: 1983
- Renovated: 2024-2025

Tenants
- Shahid Ghandi Yazd 2006–present Chadormalou 2021–present

The Shahid Nassiri Stadium is a multi-purpose stadium in Yazd, Iran. It is part of the Shahid Nassiri Sports Complex.

It is the home stadium of Chadormalou and Foolad Yazd
