= Khalij-e Fars Stadium =

Stadium in Bandar Abbas, Iran

Takthi Stadium (Bandar Abbas)
- Interactive map of Takthi Stadium (Bandar Abbas)
- Location: Bandar Abbas, Iran
- Capacity: 20,000
- Surface: Grass

Construction
- Opened: 2010

Tenants
- Shahrdari Bandarabbas

Khalij-e-Fars Stadium in Bandar Abbas, Hormozgan, Iran was opened in 2010, and is the current home to Shahrdari Bandarabbas F.C.
