= Zob Ahan Ardabil F.C. =

Iranian football club

Zob Ahan Ardabil
- Full name: Zob Ahan Ardabil Football Club
- Ground: Ali Daei Stadium; Ardabil
- Head Coach: (Iran) Sajjad Parsi
- League: Ardabil Provincial League

Zob Ahan Ardabil Football Club is an Iranian football club based in Ardabil, Iran. They competed in the Ardabil Provincial League.

== Season-by-Season ==
The table below shows the achievements of the club in various competitions.

Season	League	Position	Hazfi Cup	Notes
2010–11	2nd Division	5th/Group A

== See also ==
- Hazfi Cup
- Iran Football's 2nd Division 2009–10
