= League 3 (Iran) =

Football (soccer) league of Iran

Iran Football's 3rd Division
- Organising body: Iran Football League Organization
- Founded: 2001
- Country: Iran
- Confederation: AFC
- Number of clubs: 36
- Level on pyramid: 4
- Promotion to: League 2
- Relegation to: League 4
- Domestic cup: Hazfi Cup
- Broadcaster: IRIB
- Website: persianlegaue
- Current: 2025-26 Season

Iranian football's 3rd division (Persian: ليگ دسته سوم ایران) is the fourth-highest football division overall in the Iranian football league system.

Before 2001, the 3rd division league was the third-highest division in Iranian football league system, however, it became the fourth-highest division when Iran's football structure officially became professional.

The league consists of two stages. In the first stage, 65 teams participate in five groups of 13 teams each. The groups are organized in such a manner that teams closer to each other geographically end up in the same group. Because of this, the 3rd division can be considered a regional league. Stage one is played in single round-robin format and this is the only league organised by IRIFF which has no home-and-away format. Top two teams of each group promote to second stage and join 20 teams which already have spots due to their performance in the previous season. This means 85 different teams compete in 3rd division.

== See also ==
- IPL
- Azadegan League
- Iran Football's 2nd Division
- Iranian Super Cup
- Hazfi Cup
- League 4 (Iran)
- Iranian Futsal Super League
- Iran Futsal's 1st Division
- Iran Futsal's 2nd Division
