= League 2 (Iran) =

Iran Football's 3rd Division
- Organising body: Iran Football League Organization
- Founded: 1972 (officially); 2001 (with current format)
- Country: Iran
- Confederation: AFC
- Number of clubs: 28
- Level on pyramid: 3(2001–); 2 (1972–2001)
- Promotion to: Azadegan League
- Relegation to: 3rd Division
- Domestic cup: Hazfi Cup
- Current champions: Foolad B (1st title) (2025-26)
- Most championships: Esteghlal Ahvaz (4 titles)
- Broadcaster: Ostani Channels
- Website: persianleague.com
- Current: 2025–26 League 2 (Iran)

Iranian football's 2nd division (Persian: ليگ دسته دوم ایران) is the third-highest football division overall in the Iranian football league system. Before 2001, the 2nd division league was the second-highest division in the national football league system. However, it was changed to third-highest division when Iran's football structure officially became professional.

The league consists of two, 14-team groups who play each other twice in a home and away format. The first- and second-placed teams in each group are automatically promoted to the Azadegan League. The bottom two teams in both groups are automatically relegated to the 3rd division.

If teams in the promotion or relegation spots are tied in terms of points, a home and away series will be played. The team with the best aggregate score will either avoid relegation or win promotion.

Sometimes these rules are not followed exactly. For example, in the 2005–06 season, Deihim Ahvaz should have been relegated, but Nozhan Mazandaran despite finishing ahead of Deihim, were relegated instead because of the club's poor financial situation. Additionally the number of teams in each group was increased from twelve to fourteen this season.

== Format ==
- 12 clubs: 2002–2003
- 24 clubs: 2003–2004
- 20 clubs: 2004–2005
- 24 clubs: 2005–2006
- 28 clubs: 2006–2008
- 36 clubs: 2008–2010
- 32 clubs: 2010–2011
- 28 clubs: 2011–2014
- 40 clubs: 2014–2016
- 37 clubs: 2016–2017
- 33 clubs: 2017–2018
- 26 clubs: 2018–2019
- 28 clubs: 2019–

== League champions ==
=== As Iran's second-highest football division, 1972–1979 ===
- 1972–73: Taj Ahvaz
- 1973–74: Sepahan
- 1974–75: Tractor
- 1975–76: Machine Sazi
- 1976–77: Rah Ahan
- 1977–78: Aboomoslem
- 1978–79: did not finish

=== As Iran's second-highest football division, 1990–2001 ===
- 1990–91: Malavan (A), Aboomoslem (B), Taam Esfehan (C), Esteghlal Ahvaz (D)
- 1991–92: Bargh Shiraz
- 1992–93: Chooka Anzali
- 1993–94: Naft Ghaemshahr
- 1994–95: Bahman Karaj
- 1995–96: Payam Mashhad (A) and Sanat Naft Abadan (B)
- 1996–97: Fajr Sepasi
- 1997–98: Malavan
- 1998–99: Bahman Karaj
- 1999–00: Bargh Shiraz
- 2000–01: Aboomoslem

=== As Iran's third-highest football division, 2001—Present ===
- 2001–02: -
- 2002–03: Shahid Ghandi
- 2003–04: Sanati Kaveh (National Group) and Pasargad Tehran (Region Groups/North) and Deyhim Ahvaz (Region Groups/South)
- 2004–05: Shahrdari Langarudn (A) and Pegah Khozestan (B)
- 2005–06: Pegah Tehran (A) and Etka Gorgan (B)
- 2006–07: Sepahan Novin (A) and Bargh Tehran (B)
- 2007–08: Aluminium Hormozgan
- 2008–09: Sanati Kaveh (A) and Mes Sarcheshmeh (B)
- 2009–10: Sepidrood Rasht
- 2010–11: Esteghlal Jonub
- 2011–12: Esteghlal Ahvaz
- 2012–13: Naft Gachsaran (A) and Siah Jamegan (B)
- 2013–14: Shahrdari Ardabil (A) and Etka Gorgan (B)
- 2014–15: Aluminium Arak
- 2015–16: Oxin Alborz (A) and Sepidrood Rasht (B)
- 2016–17: Shahrdari Tabriz (A) and Shahrdari Mahshahr (B)
- 2017–18: Karoon Arvand Khorramshahr (A) and Shahin Bushehr (B)
- 2018–19: Khooshe Talaee
- 2019–20: Chooka Talesh
- 2020–21: Mes Shahr-e Babak
- 2021–22: Chooka Talesh
- 2022–23: Naft va Gaz Gachsaran
- 2023-24: Nirooye Zamini Tehran
- 2024-25: Chooka Talesh F.C.

== See also ==
- IPL
- Azadegan League
- Iran Football's 3rd Division
- Iranian Super Cup
- Hazfi Cup
- Iranian Futsal Super League
- Iran Futsal's 1st Division
