= 2011–12 Persepolis F.C. season =

Persepolis F.C.
2011–12 season
- Chairman: Habib Kashani (Until Sep); Mohammad Rouyanian
- Manager: Hamid Estili (first 15 weeks); Mohsen Ashouri (Caretaker) (till week 17); Mustafa Denizli
- Stadium: Azadi Stadium
- Persian Gulf Cup: 12th
- Hazfi Cup: Quarter-final
- Champions League: Round of 16
- Top goalscorer: League: Ali Karimi (11); All: Ali Karimi (14)
- Highest home attendance: 96,200 v Al Gharafa (April 17, 2012)
- Lowest home attendance: 5,000 v Sepahan (November 19, 2011)
- Average home league attendance: 50,600
Home colours	Away colours	Third colours

The 2011–12 season was Persepolis's 11th season in the Pro League, and their 29th consecutive season in the top division of Iranian Football. They competed in the Champions League. They also competed in the Hazfi Cup but were eliminated by Esteghlal in the quarter-finals . Persepolis is captained by Ali Karimi.

== Player ==
=== First team squad ===
Note: Flags indicate national team as defined under FIFA eligibility rules; some limited exceptions apply. Players may hold more than one non-FIFA nationality.

No.	Pos.	Nation	Player
1	GK	BIH	Asmir Avdukić (on loan from Borac Banja Luka)
2	DF	IRI	Alireza Mohammad
3	MF	IRI	Mehrdad Pouladi
4	DF	IRI	Mojtaba Shiri
6	DF	IRI	Mohammad Nosrati
7	MF	IRI	Hamidreza Aliasgari
8	MF	IRI	Ali Karimi (Vice-Captain)
9	MF	IRI	Maziar Zare
10	FW	IRI	Gholamreza Rezaei
11	MF	IRI	Hossein Badamaki
12	FW	LBA	Éamon Zayed
13	DF	IRI	Sheys Rezaei
14	MF	IRI	Mohammad Nouri
15	MF	IRI	Saman Aghazamani

No.	Pos.	Nation	Player
17	FW	IRI	Javad Kazemian
18	DF	IRI	Ebrahim Shakouri
19	MF	IRI	Mehdi Mahdavikia (Captain)
20	DF	IRI	Alireza Noormohammadi
21	FW	IRI	Vahid Hashemian (3rd captain)
22	GK	IRI	Misagh Memarzadeh
23	MF	IRI	Amir Hossein Feshangchi
24	FW	IRI	Hadi Norouzi
27	FW	IRI	Rouhollah Seifollahi
28	GK	IRI	Masoud Dastani
30	DF	BFA	Mamadou Tall
33	FW	IRI	Mehrdad Oladi
35	DF	IRI	Hossein Kanaani
38	GK	IRI	Hossein Hooshyar

=== Transfers ===
==== Summer transfers ====
In: Note: Flags indicate national team as defined under FIFA eligibility rules; some limited exceptions apply. Players may hold more than one non-FIFA nationality.

No.	Pos.	Nation	Player
8	MF	IRI	Ali Karimi (from (Germany) FC Schalke 04)
6	DF	IRI	Mohammad Nosrati (from Tractor Sazi)
22	GK	IRI	Misagh Memarzadeh (from Foolad)
33	FW	IRI	Mehrdad Oladi (from Malavan)
30	DF	BFA	Mamadou Tall (from (Portugal) União Leiria)
17	FW	IRI	Javad Kazemian (from Sepahan)

Out: Note: Flags indicate national team as defined under FIFA eligibility rules; some limited exceptions apply. Players may hold more than one non-FIFA nationality.

No.	Pos.	Nation	Player
25	MF	IRI	Mehdi Shiri (Gostaresh Foolad)
40	FW	IRI	Saeed Hallafi (to Machine Sazi)
36	GK	IRI	Rahman Ahmadi (to Sepahan)
3	DF	IRI	Sepehr Heidari (to Mes Kerman)
8	FW	GER	Shpejtim Arifi (to Tractor Sazi)
7	MF	IRI	Mohammad Parvin (to Paykan)
5	DF	MLI	Sékou Berthé (Released)
27	MF	BRA	Tiago Alves Fraga (to Pas Hamedan)
30	FW	IRI	Mojtaba Zarei (to Naft Tehran)
17	DF	IRI	Jalal Akbari (Released)

==== Winter transfers ====
In: Note: Flags indicate national team as defined under FIFA eligibility rules; some limited exceptions apply. Players may hold more than one non-FIFA nationality.

No.	Pos.	Nation	Player
12	FW	LBA	Éamon Zayed (from (Republic of Ireland) Derry City)
32	MF	IRI	Saeid Ghadami (from Foolad)
19	DF	IRI	Mehdi Mahdavikia (from Damash Gilan)
38	GK	IRI	Hossein Hooshyar (from Shahrdari Yasuj)
35	DF	IRI	Hossein Kanaani (from Persepolis U23)
3	MF	IRI	Mehrdad Pooladi (on loan from Mes Kerman)
1	GK	BIH	Asmir Avdukić (on loan from (Bosnia and Herzegovina) FK Borac Banja)

Out: Note: Flags indicate national team as defined under FIFA eligibility rules; some limited exceptions apply. Players may hold more than one non-FIFA nationality.

No.	Pos.	Nation	Player
1	GK	IRI	Alireza Haghighi (to (Russia) Rubin Kazan)
16	MF	IRI	Mohammad Mansouri (to Zob Ahan)

== Competitions ==
Competition	Started round	Current position / round	Final position / round	First match	Last match
2011–12 Persian Gulf Cup	—	—	12th	2 August 2011	11 May 2012
AFC Champions League	Group stage	—		7 March 2012	
2011–12 Hazfi Cup	Round of 32	—	Quarter-Final	25 October 2011	9 December 2011

Updated to match played 16 March 2012
Source: Competitions

=== Iran Pro League ===
==== Standings ====
Pos	Team	Pld	W	D	L	GF	GA	GD	Pts
10	Sanat Naft	34	11	10	13	49	57	−8	43
11	Rah Ahan	34	9	15	10	43	42	+1	42
12	Persepolis	34	10	12	12	50	54	−4	42
13	Fajr Sepasi	34	10	11	13	31	38	−7	41
14	Foolad	34	10	10	14	35	37	−2	40

Updated to match(es) played on 11 May 2012. Source: varzesh3.com
Rules for classification: 1) points; 2) goal difference; 3) number of goals scored.

==== Results summary ====
Overall								Home						Away					
Pld	W	D	L	GF	GA	GD	Pts	W	D	L	GF	GA	GD	W	D	L	GF	GA	GD
34	10	12	12	50	54	−4	42	5	6	7	25	25	0	5	6	5	25	29	−4

Last updated: 6 May 2012.
Source: Ipl Stats

==== Results by round ====
Round	1	2	3	4	5	6	7	8	9	10	11	12	13	14	15	16	17	18	19	20	21	22	23	24	25	26	27	28	29	30	31	32	33	34
Ground	H	A	H	A	H	A	H	A	H	A	H	A	H	A	H	H	H	A	H	A	H	A	H	H	H	A	H	H	H	A	H	A	H	A
Result	D	L	L	D	W	D	L	W	W	L	D	W	D	W	L	D	D	L	W	D	W	L	D	W	L	D	D	W	L	D	L	L	L	W
Position	7	15	17	15	12	13	15	10	7	10	11	7	10	6	8	8	9	11	8	7	7	9	8	7	7	8	8	8	8	7	9	11	15	12

Updated to match(es) played on 6 May 2012. Source: "Ipl".
A = Away; H = Home; W = Win; D = Draw; L = Loss

==== Matches ====
Win Draw Loss Postponed

Date Round	Home	Score	Away	Location

August 2, 2011 Round 1	Persepolis	1–1	Malavan	Tehran
22:30 UTC+04:30	Badamaki 78'; Aghazamani (yellow card)	Report	Daghagheleh 73'; Pourgholami (yellow card)	Stadium: Azadi Stadium; Attendance: 65,000; Referee: Mahmoud Rafiei

August 7, 2011 Round 2	Shahin Bushehr	2–1	Persepolis	Bushehr
22:30 UTC+04:30	Petrovic 50'; Tanhaei 71'; Noori (yellow card)	Report	Nosrati 81'; Sh.Rezaei (yellow card)	Stadium: Shahid Beheshti Stadium; Attendance: 12,000; Referee: Saeid Mozaffarizadeh

August 11, 2011 Round 3	Persepolis	1–2	Shahrdari Tabriz	Tehran
22:30 UTC+04:30	Karimi 91'; Hashemian (yellow card)	Report	Baou 46'; Ghafouri 58'; Daghighi (yellow card)	Stadium: Azadi Stadium; Attendance: 50,000; Referee: Mohsen Ghahremani

August 16, 2011 Round 4	Mes Sarcheshmeh	2–2	Persepolis	Sarcheshmeh
22:30 UTC+04:30	Brnovic 01'; Samereh 22'; Samereh (yellow card); Molaei (yellow card); Nourollahi (yellow card); Fathollahi (yellow card)	Report	Karimi 37'; Kazemian 45'; Kazemian (yellow card); Aghazamani (yellow card); Karimi (red card) 79'	Stadium: Mes Sarcheshmeh Stadium; Attendance: 10,000; Referee: Ahmad Salehi

August 23, 2011 Round 5	Persepolis	3–1	Sanat Naft Abadan	Tehran
22:30 UTC+04:30	Kazemian 25', 57', 66'; Kazemian (yellow card); Zare (yellow card)	Report	Arab 70'; Ramezani (yellow card); Sharifinasab (yellow card)	Stadium: Azadi Stadium; Attendance: 35,000; Referee: Mohsen Torki

September 8, 2011 Round 6	Zob Ahan	2–2	Persepolis	Fuladshahr
20:00 UTC+04:30	Farhadi 2'; Machado 79'; Hosseini (yellow card); Machado (red card) 96'	Report	Karimi 49'; Noormohammadi 93'; Nosrati (yellow card); Rezaei (yellow card); Shakouri (yellow card)	Stadium: Foolad Shahr Stadium; Attendance: 15,000; Referee: Mahmoud Rafiei

September 16, 2011 Round 7	Persepolis	0–2	Esteghlal	Tehran
18:30 UTC+04:30	Rezaei (yellow card); Badamaki (yellow card); Noormohammadi (yellow card); Zare (yellow card)	Report	Majidi 15'; Jabari 82'; Rahmati (yellow card); Heidari (yellow card)	Stadium: Azadi Stadium; Attendance: 100,000; Referee: Mohsen Torki

September 25, 2011 Round 8	Fajr Sepasi	1–2	Persepolis	Shiraz
18:30 UTC+03:30	Kalantari 79'; Rajabzadeh (yellow card)	Report	Hashemian 70'; Karimi 90'; Karimi (yellow card)	Stadium: Hafezieh; Attendance: 20,000; Referee: Alireza Faghani

September 30, 2011 Round 9	Persepolis	2–0	Saba Qom	Tehran
18:15 UTC+03:30	Norouzi 12'; Rezaei 88'; Zare (yellow card); Aghazamani (yellow card)	Report	Hamdinejad (yellow card); Bayat (yellow card)	Stadium: Azadi Stadium; Attendance: 20,000; Referee: Ahmad Salehi

October 15, 2011 Round 10	Mes Kerman	1–0	Persepolis	Kerman
16:50 UTC+03:30	Amraei 34'; S.Heidari (yellow card); E.Yousefi (yellow card)	Report	Badamaki (yellow card); Oladi (yellow card)	Stadium: Shahid Bahonar Stadium; Attendance: 40,000; Referee: Mohsen Ghahremani

October 21, 2011 Round 11	Persepolis	0–0	Naft Tehran	Tehran
18:15 UTC+03:30		Report		Stadium: Azadi Stadium; Attendance: 20,000; Referee: Hedayat Mombeyni

October 29, 2011 Round 12	Damash	2–3	Persepolis	Rasht
15:30 UTC+03:30	Gholami 22'; Chavoshi 59'; Nazifkar (yellow card)	Report	Hashemian 15'; Norouzi 50'; Nouri 88'; Zare (yellow card); Nosrati (yellow card); Karimi (yellow card); Badamaki (yellow card)	Stadium: Dr. Azodi; Attendance: 10,000; Referee: Mohsen Torki

November 19, 2011 Round 13	Persepolis	0–0	Sepahan	Tehran
16:20 UTC+03:30	Zare (yellow card); Norouzi (red card) 76'	Report	Hosseini (yellow card); Bengar (yellow card)	Stadium: Azadi Stadium; Attendance: 5,000; Referee: Alireza Faghani

November 22, 2011 Round 14	Saipa	0–1	Persepolis	Tehran
15:15 UTC+03:30		Report	Zare 40' (pen.)	Stadium: Azadi Stadium; Attendance: 5,000; Referee: Mohsen Ghahremani

December 2, 2011 Round 15	Persepolis	0–1	Tractor Sazi	Tehran
15:00 UTC+03:30	Oladi (yellow card); Gh.Rezaei (yellow card); Nouri (yellow card)	Report	Akbarpour 65'; Akbarpour (yellow card); Arifi (yellow card)	Stadium: Azadi Stadium; Attendance: 20,000; Referee: Mahmoud Rafiei

December 15, 2011 Round 16	Rah Ahan	1–1	Persepolis	Tehran
16:45 UTC+03:30	Abdi 75'; Alishah (yellow card); Abbasfard (yellow card)	Report	Nouri 39'; Haghighi (yellow card); Tall (yellow card)	Stadium: Azadi Stadium; Attendance: 10,000; Referee: Alireza Faghani

December 19, 2011 Round 17	Persepolis	1–1	Foolad	Tehran
16:45 UTC+03:30	Zare 40'; Karimi (yellow card); Noormohammadi (yellow card)	Report	Rahmani 39'; Khouraj (red card) 40'	Stadium: Azadi Stadium; Attendance: 5,000; Referee: Mohsen Torki

January 5, 2012 Round 18	Malavan	2–0	Persepolis	Anzali
15:00 UTC+03:30	Mosalman 45+1'; Ramezani 79' (pen.); M. Heydari (yellow card); Mosalman (yellow card); Hasani Sefat (yellow card)	Report	Mahdavikia (penalty missed)	Stadium: Takhti Stadium (Anzali); Attendance: 10,000; Referee: Alireza Faghani

January 11, 2012 Round 19	Persepolis	4–1	Shahin Bushehr	Tehran
16:20 UTC+03:30	Karimi 4' (pen.); Gh. Rezaei 12'; Nouri 20'; Oladi 46'; Noormohammadi (red card) 45+1'; Gh. Rezaei (yellow card)	Report	Tanhaei 36'; Taleblou (yellow card); Nazarzadeh (yellow card); Pourkhosravani (yellow card); Irannejad (yellow card)	Stadium: Azadi Stadium; Attendance: 15,000; Referee: Yadollah Jahanbazi

January 16, 2012 Round 20	Shahrdari Tabriz	2–2	Persepolis	Tabriz
16:45 UTC+03:30	Daghighi 13' (pen.); Bazri 27'; Žarković (yellow card); Goudarzi (yellow card)	Report	Mohammad 37'; Karimi 61'; Memarzadeh (yellow card)	Stadium: Yadegar-e Emam Stadium; Attendance: 15,000; Referee: Ahmad Salehi

January 20, 2012 Round 21	Persepolis	2–1	Mes Sarcheshmeh	Tehran
16:20 UTC+03:30	Nouri 76'; Karimi 87' (pen.); Badamaki (yellow card); Oladi (yellow card)	Report	Bajelan 2'; Zahedi (yellow card)	Stadium: Azadi Stadium; Attendance: 40,000; Referee: Alborz Hajipour

January 25, 2012 Round 22	Sanat Naft Abadan	4–2	Persepolis	Abadan
15:30 UTC+03:30	Founéké Sy 5', 27', 34'; Pachajyan 47'; Ramezani (yellow card); Pachajyan (yellow card); A. Mohammadi (yellow card)	Report	Karimi 22'; M. Nouri 85'; Aliasgari (yellow card); Shakouri (yellow card)	Stadium: Takhti Stadium (Abadan); Attendance: 8,000; Referee: Saeid Mozaffarizadeh

January 29, 2012 Round 23	Persepolis	0–0	Zob Ahan	Tehran
18:00 UTC+03:30	Hamidreza Aliasgari (yellow card)	Report		Stadium: Azadi Stadium; Attendance: 7,000; Referee: Mohsen Ghahremani

February 2, 2012 Round 24	Esteghlal	2–3	Persepolis	Tehran
18:00 UTC+03:30	Meydavoodi 32'; Zandi 50'; Zandi (yellow card); Sharifat (yellow card); Hamoudi (yellow card)	Report	Zayed 82', 83', 92'; Oladi (red card) 68'	Stadium: Azadi Stadium; Attendance: 65,000; Referee: Alireza Faghani

February 7, 2012 Round 25	Persepolis	2–3	Fajr Sepasi	Tehran
17:00 UTC+03:30	Nouri 28' 70'	Report	Karimian 54'; Rajab Zadeh 56'; Kalantari 87'; Sangchouli (yellow card)	Stadium: Azadi Stadium; Attendance: 10,000; Referee: Saeid Bakhsizadeh

February 15, 2012 Round 26	Saba Qom	2–2	Persepolis	Qom
14:45 UTC+03:30	Enayati 21', 66'; Heidari (yellow card); Sadeghi (red card)	Report	Karimi 38', 90'; Noormohammadi (yellow card); Memarzadeh (yellow card); Karimi (yellow card); Badamaki (yellow card); Mamadou Tall (yellow card); Zare (yellow card)	Stadium: Yadegar-e Emam Stadium; Attendance: 11,000; Referee: Saeid Mozaffarizadeh

March 12, 2012 Round 27	Persepolis	1–1	Mes Kerman	Tehran
17:30 UTC+03:30	Kazemian 34'; Zayed (yellow card)	Report	Khalili 13'; Khalilzadeh (yellow card); Hasanzadeh (yellow card)	Stadium: Azadi Stadium; Attendance: 4,100; Referee: Alborz Hajipour

March 16, 2012 Round 28	Naft Tehran	0–3	Persepolis	Tehran
16:30 UTC+03:30		Report	Own goal 27'; Zayed 55'; Feshangchi 83'; Aghazamani (yellow card); Kazemian (yellow card)	Stadium: Azadi Stadium; Attendance: 15,000; Referee: Ahmad Salehi

April 8, 2012 Round 29	Persepolis	0–3	Damash	Tehran
18:50 UTC+03:30	Karimi; Noormohammadi (yellow card); Rezaei (yellow card); Zare (red card); Nosrati (red card)	[ Report]	Chavoshi; Mahdavi; Hajati (yellow card); Gholami (yellow card)	Stadium: Azadi Stadium; Attendance: 10,000; Referee: Rafiei

April 12, 2012 Round 30	Sepahan	1–1	Persepolis	Fooladshahr
17:00 UTC+03:30	Sukaj 81'; Jafari (yellow card); Correa (yellow card)	[ Report]	Nouri 86'; Badamaki (yellow card)	Stadium: Foolad Shahr Stadium; Attendance: 15,000; Referee: Mohsen Torki

April 21, 2012 Round 31	Persepolis	2–4	Saipa	Tehran
19:00 UTC+03:30	Shakouri 74'; Noormohammadi 87'	Summary	Ansarifard 5'; Manouchehri 7'; Gholamnejad 58'; Gharibi 79'	Stadium: Azadi Stadium; Referee: Saeid Mozaffarizadeh

April 26, 2012 Round 32	Tractor Sazi	4–1	Persepolis	Tabriz
17:00 UTC+03:30	Flávio Paixão 51' 64'; Hatami 58'; Ebrahimi 66'	Summary	Noormohammadi 80'	Stadium: Yadegar-e Emam Stadium; Referee: Alireza Faghani

May 6, 2012 Round 33	Persepolis	3–4	Rah Ahan	Tehran
17:00 UTC+03:30	Éamon Zayed 21' 83' 89'	Summary	Abdi 20' 45+2' 78'; Kazemi 75' (pen.)	Stadium: Azadi Stadium

May 11, 2012 Round 34	Foolad	1–2	Persepolis	Ahvaz
17:30 UTC+03:30	Reykani 8'; Reykani (yellow card)	[ Report]	Karimi 56'; Hashemian 69'; Zare (yellow card)	Stadium: Ghadir Stadium; Attendance: 10,000; Referee: Akbarian

==== Score overview ====
Win Draw Loss

Opposition	Home score	Away score	Aggregate score
Esteghlal	0–2	2–3	3–4
Foolad	1–1	1–2	3–2
Damash	0–3	2–3	3–5
Fajr Sepasi	2–3	1–2	4–4
Malavan	1–1	2–0	1–3
Mes Kerman	1–1	1–0	1–2
Mes Sarcheshmeh	2–1	2–2	4–3
Naft Tehran	0–0	0–3	3–0
Rah Ahan	3–4	1–1	4–5
Saba	2–0	2–2	4–2
Saipa	2–4	0–1	3–4
Sanat Naft	3–1	4–2	5–5
Sepahan	0–0	1–1	1–1
Shahin Bushehr	4–1	2–1	5–3
Shahrdari Tabriz	1–2	2–2	3–4
Tractor	0–1	4–1	1–5
Zob Ahan	0–0	2–2	2–2

=== Hazfi Cup ===
==== Matches ====
Win Draw Loss Postponed

Date Round	Home	Score	Away	Location

October 25, 2011 1/32	Persepolis	2–1 (a.e.t.)	Mes Rafsanjan	Tehran
18:00 UTC+04:30	Rezaei 35'; Nouri 117'; Badamaki (yellow card); Kazemian (yellow card)	Report	Noormohammadi (o.g) 80'; Nouriyan (yellow card); Gholami (yellow card)	Stadium: Azadi Stadium; Attendance: 1,000; Referee: Ahmad Salehi

November 27, 2011 1/16	Zob Ahan	2–3	Persepolis	Fuladshahr
14:30 UTC+03:30	Talebi 7'; Hosseini 56'; Mahini (yellow card); Machado (yellow card)	Report	Zare 17' (pen.) 78'; Feshangchi 60'; Tall (yellow card); Kazemian (yellow card)	Stadium: Foolad Shahr Stadium; Attendance: 3,500; Referee: Saeid Mozaffarizadeh

December 09, 2011 1/8	Persepolis	0–3 (a.e.t.)	Esteghlal Tehran	Tehran
16:45 UTC+03:30		Report	Jabbari 94' 99'; Sharifat 107'	Stadium: Azadi Stadium; Attendance: 80,000; Referee: Hedayat Mombeyni

=== AFC Champions League ===
==== Group stage ====
Pos	Team	Pld	W	D	L	GF	GA	GD	Pts	Qualification	HIL	PER	GHA	SHA
1	(Saudi Arabia) Al-Hilal	6	3	3	0	10	7	+3	12	Advance to knockout stage	—	1–1	2–1	2–1
2	(Iran) Persepolis	6	3	2	1	14	5	+9	11	Advance to knockout stage	0–1	—	1–1	6–1
3	(Qatar) Al-Gharafa	6	1	3	2	7	10	−3	6		3–3	0–3	—	2–1
4	(United Arab Emirates) Al-Shabab	6	0	2	4	5	14	−9	2		1–1	1–3	0–0	—

Source: WorldFootball.net

===== Results and positions =====
Round	1	2	3	4	5	6
Ground	A	H	A	H	H	A
Result	D	W	W	D	L	W
Position	1	1	1	1	2	2

Updated to match(es) played on 1 May 2012. Source: "ACL". Archived from the original on 2009-06-26.
A = Away; H = Home; W = Win; D = Draw; L = Loss

Date Round	Home	Score	Away	Location

March 07 2012 G1	Al Hilal (Saudi Arabia)	1–1	(Iran) Persepolis	Riyadh
20:30 UTC+03:00	Al Fraidi (yellow card) 38'; Hawsawi (red card) 40'; Byung-Soo Yoo (yellow card) 44'; Al Shalhoub 54'	Summary	Karimi 43' (pen.)	Stadium: Prince Faisal bin Fahd Stadium; Attendance: 9,574; Referee: Min-Hu Lee (South Korea); Assistant referees: Yoon Kwang Yeol (South Korea) , Kim Sung Il (South Korea); Fourth official: Tong Kui Sum (Hong Kong); Man of the Match: Al-Shalhoub (Saudi Arabia)

March 21, 2012 G2	Persepolis (Iran)	6–1	(United Arab Emirates) Al-Shabab	Tehran
17:00 UTC+03:30	Zayed 8', 48', 54'; Rezaei 60'; Karimi 62' (pen.); Feshangchi (yellow card) 69'; Feshangchi 87'	Summary	Villanueva (yellow card) 5'; Haydarov (yellow card) 27'; Ciel 56' (pen.); Qassim (yellow card) 57'	Stadium: Azadi Stadium; Attendance: 82,700; Referee: Masaaki Toma (Japan); Assistant referees: Sagara Toru (Japan) , Igarashi Hiroyuki (Japan); Fourth official: Arumghan Rowan (India); Man of the Match: Zayed (Libya)

April 04 2012 G3	Al Gharafa (Qatar)	0–3	(Iran) Persepolis	Doha
18:35 UTC+03:00	Tardelli (yellow card) 90+3'	Summary	G. Rezaei 3'; Zayed 6'; Karimi (yellow card) 57'; Kazemian 73'	Stadium: Al-Gharafa Stadium; Attendance: 2,800; Referee: Abdullah Al Hilali (Oman); Assistant referees: Hamed Sulaiman (Oman) , Khalid Nasser (Oman); Fourth official: Yasser Nasseb (Oman); Man of the Match: Gh. Rezaei (Iran)

April 17, 2012 G4	Persepolis (Iran)	1–1	(Qatar) Al Gharafa	Tehran
17:00 UTC+03:30	Karimi 85'	Summary	Hamed Shami Zaher (yellow card) 40'; Otmane El Assas (yellow card) 66'; Majidi (yellow card) 66' (yellow-red card) 72'; Yousief Ramadan (yellow card) 89'; Quaye 90+1'	Stadium: Azadi Stadium; Attendance: 96,200; Referee: Ravshan Irmatov (Uzbekistan); Assistant referees: A. Rasulov (Uzbekistan) , B. Kochkarov (Kyrgyzstan); Fourth official: V. Tseytlin (Uzbekistan); Man of the Match: Karimi (Iran)

May 01 2012 G5	Persepolis (Iran)	0–1	(Saudi Arabia) Al Hilal	Tehran
17:00 UTC+03:30	Feshangchi (yellow card) 62'; Tall (yellow card) 90'	Summary	Osama Hawsawi (yellow card) 39'; Abdulatif Al-Ghanam (yellow card) 52'; El-Arabi 58'	Stadium: Azadi Stadium; Attendance: 73,154; Referee: (South Korea) Kim Dong-Jin; Assistant referees: Jeong Hae Sang (South Korea) , Yang Byoung Eun (South Korea); Fourth official: R. Ishmatov (Tajikistan); Man of the Match: El-Arabi (Morocco)

May 15, 2012 G6	Al-Shabab (United Arab Emirates)	1–3	(Iran) Persepolis	Dubai
20:00 UTC+03:00	Essa Mohammed 8'; Ali Hamdan Juma Qassim (yellow card) 74'	Summary	Aghazamani (yellow card) 14'; Zayed 43'; Pooladi 53'; Nouri (yellow card) 74'; Badamaki 90'	Stadium: Maktoum Bin Rashid Al Maktoum Stadium; Attendance: 5,822; Referee: (China) Tan Hai; Assistant referees: Mu Yuxin (China) , Huo Weiming (China); Fourth official: Ali Gawf Ali (Yemen); Man of the Match: Zayed (Libya)

==== Knockout stage ====
May 23, 2012 Round of 16	Al-Ittihad (Saudi Arabia)	3–0	(Iran) Persepolis	Jeddah
21:10 UTC+03:00	Hazazi 36' (pen.); Abdelghani 45+1'; Otaif 87'	Report		Stadium: Prince Abdullah al-Faisal Stadium; Attendance: 15,300; Referee: (Uzbekistan) Valentin Kovalenko; Assistant referees: Rafael Ilyasov (Uzbekistan); Fourth official: Saidkasimov Mamur (Uzbekistan); Man of the Match: Faouzi (Morocco)

=== Friendly Matches ===
==== Pre Season ====
Win Draw Loss Postponed

Date Round	Home	Score	Away	Location

July 14, 2011	Persepolis	3–1	Persepolis B	Iran
10:00 UTC+04:30	Gh.Rezaei 18'; Nouri 30'; Mansouri 60'	Report	Hasan Mahdlu 55'	Stadium: Derafshifar Stadium; Attendance: 400

July 22, 2011	Konyaspor (Turkey)	1–2	Persepolis	Turkey
16:30 UTC+04:30	Yagiz	Report	Gh.Rezaei 19'; Nouri 39' (pen.)	Stadium: Patalya Spor; Attendance: 500

July 26, 2011	Göztepe (Turkey)	1–2	Persepolis	Turkey
17:40 UTC+04:30		Report	Nouri 15'; Badamaki 20'	Stadium: Göztepe; Attendance: 400

==== During Season ====
September 1, 2011	Siah Jamegan Khorasan	0–1	Persepolis	Mashhad
17:00 UTC+04:30		Report	22' H. Aliasgari	Stadium: Samen Stadium; Attendance: 4000; Referee: Hossein Nekou Azad

October 8, 2011	Kish XI	1–12	Persepolis	Kish Island
18:00 UTC+03:30	83' (pen.)	Report	A. Noormohammadi 17'; H. Badamaki 22' 39' 67'; V. Hashemian 28' 61'; M. Mansouri 32'; A. Feshangchi 35'; Nouri 65' 76' 77' 90'	Stadium: Olympic stadium Attendance: 500

December 12, 2011	Persepolis	6–0	Parag Tehran	Tehran
	M. Nouri 5'; G. Rezaei 12'; M. Oladi 45'; J. Kazemian 65'; M. Elhaei 71'; S. Ghadami 79'	Report		Stadium: Derafshifar Stadium; Attendance: 50

January 1, 2012	Persepolis	6–0	Armin Qazvin	Tehran
	V. Hashemian; M. Mahdavikia; M. Oladi; J. Kazemian; R. Seifollahi; Own goal	Report		Stadium: Derafshifar Stadium; Attendance: 50

February 26, 2012	Persepolis	1–0	Paykan	Tehran
11:00 UTC+03:30	M. Tahmasebi (o.g.)	Report		Stadium: Derafshifar Stadium; Attendance: No Attendance

February 29, 2012	Persepolis	2–2	Shahrdari Tabriz	Tehran
11:00 UTC+03:30	H. Norouzi (pen.); J. Kazemian	Report	S. Daghighi (pen.); M. Ghanbari	Stadium: Derafshifar Stadium; Attendance: No Attendance

March 30, 2012	Persepolis	2–2	PAS Hamedan	Tehran
17:00 UTC+03:30	H. Aliasgari 53'; Gh. Rezaei 75'	Report	A. Mohebi 35'; M. Tabrizi 64'	Stadium: Derafshifar Stadium

===== Velayat Cup =====
Team	Pld	W	D	L	GF	GA	GD	Pts
(Iran) Persepolis	2	1	1	0	3	2	+1	4
(Paraguay) Nacional	2	1	0	1	1	1	0	3
(Iran) Esteghlal	2	0	1	1	2	3	−1	1

Win Draw Loss

Date Round	Home	Score	Away	Location

3 November 2011 1	Persepolis	1–0	(Paraguay) Nacional	Iran
16:30 UTC+03:30	H. Norouzi 85' (pen.)	Report		Stadium: Azadi Stadium; Attendance: 400; Referee: Ahmad Salehi; Man of the Match: Badamaki

7 November 2011 2	Persepolis	2–2	Esteghlal	Iran
16:30 UTC+03:30	H. Norouzi 6' (pen.) 46'; M. Memarzadeh (yellow card); M. Tall (yellow card); A. Mohammad (yellow card) 80' (yellow-red card)	Report	A. Borhani 33'; H. Omranzadeh 70'; J. Shirzad (yellow card); F. Zandi (yellow card)	Stadium: Azadi Stadium; Attendance: 20,000; Referee: Mozaffari Zadeh; Man of the Match: Norouzi

== Statistics ==
=== Appearances ===
No.	Pos	Nat	Player	Total		Iran Pro League		AFC Champions League		Hazfi Cup	
No.	Pos	Nat	Player	Apps	Goals	Apps	Goals	Apps	Goals	Apps	Goals
1	GK	(Bosnia and Herzegovina) BIH	Asmir Avdukić	6	0	0+0	0	6+0	0	0+0	0
2	DF	(Iran) IRI	Alireza Mohammad	17	1	13+3	1	0+0	0	0+1	0
3	DF	(Iran) IRI	Mehrdad Pooladi	6	1	0+0	0	6+0	1	0+0	0
4	DF	(Iran) IRI	Mojtaba Shiri	20	0	17+0	0	0+0	0	2+1	0
6	DF	(Iran) IRI	Mohammad Nosrati	20	1	14+0	1	5+0	0	1+0	0
7	MF	(Iran) IRI	Hamidreza Aliasgari	18	0	11+2	0	5+0	0	0+0	0
8	MF	(Iran) IRI	Ali Karimi	31	14	22+1	11	6+0	3	2+0	0
9	MF	(Iran) IRI	Maziar Zare	29	4	21+3	2	1+2	0	2+0	2
10	FW	(Iran) IRI	Gholamreza Rezaei	34	4	24+2	2	6+0	2	2+0	0
11	MF	(Iran) IRI	Hossein Badamaki	32	2	23+3	1	1+2	1	3+0	0
12	FW	(Libya) LBA	Éamon Zayed	10	9	3+2	4	5+0	5	0+0	0
13	DF	(Iran) IRI	Sheys Rezaei	16	1	8+1	0	6+0	0	1+0	1
14	MF	(Iran) IRI	Mohammad Nouri	33	8	23+3	7	4+0	0	1+2	1
15	MF	(Iran) IRI	Saman Aghazamani	21	0	7+7	0	5+0	0	2+0	0
17	FW	(Iran) IRI	Javad Kazemian	27	6	15+5	5	3+2	1	2+0	0
18	DF	(Iran) IRI	Ebrahim Shakouri	20	0	15+3	0	0+1	0	1+0	0
19	DF	(Iran) IRI	Mehdi Mahdavikia	11	0	2+6	0	0+3	0	0+0	0
20	DF	(Iran) IRI	Alireza Noormohammadi	28	1	23+1	1	1+0	0	3+0	0
21	FW	(Iran) IRI	Vahid Hashemian	10	2	4+5	2	0+1	0	0+0	0
22	GK	(Iran) IRI	Misagh Memarzadeh	11	0	11+0	0	0+0	0	0+0	0
23	MF	(Iran) IRI	Amir Hossein Feshangchi	25	3	10+8	1	2+2	1	2+1	1
24	FW	(Iran) IRI	Hadi Norouzi	18	2	8+6	2	1+1	0	2+0	0
27	FW	(Iran) IRI	Rouhollah Seifollahi [R]	2	0	0+1	0	0+0	0	0+1	0
28	GK	(Iran) IRI	Masoud Dastani [R]	0	0	0+0	0	0+0	0	0+0	0
30	DF	(Burkina Faso) BFA	Mamadou Tall	9	0	6+0	0	0+1	0	2+0	0
32	MF	(Iran) IRI	Reza Hamzepour [R]	0	0	0+0	0	0+0	0	0+0	0
33	FW	(Iran) IRI	Mehrdad Oladi	18	1	11+6	1	0+0	0	1+0	0
34	MF	(Iran) IRI	Jafar Barzegar [R]	0	0	0+0	0	0+0	0	0+0	0
35	DF	(Iran) IRI	Hossein Kanaani	0	0	0+0	0	0+0	0	0+0	0
37	MF	(Iran) IRI	Saeid Ghadami [R]	0	0	0+0	0	0+0	0	0+0	0
38	GK	(Iran) IRI	Hossein Hooshyar	3	0	3+0	0	0+0	0	0+0	0
40	MF	(Iran) IRI	Mohammad Mehdi Elhaei [R]	0	0	0+0	0	0+0	0	0+0	0
44	GK	(Iran) IRI	Ali Rezaei [R]	0	0	0+0	0	0+0	0	0+0	0
Players who are currently out on loan/have left the club
1	GK	(Iran) IRI	Alireza Haghighi	17	0	14+0	0	0+0	0	3+0	0
16	MF	(Iran) IRI	Mohammad Mansouri	11	0	1+7	0	0+0	0	1+2	0

[R] - Reserve team player

=== Top scorers ===
Includes all competitive matches. The list is sorted by shirt number when total goals are equal.

Last updated on 4 April 2012

Ran	No.	Pos	Nat	Name	Pro League	Champions League	Hazfi Cup	Total
1	8	MF	(Iran)	Ali Karimi	11	3	0	14
2	14	MF	(Iran)	Mohammad Nouri	8	0	1	9
2	12	FW	(Libya)	Éamon Zayed	7	5	0	12
4	17	FW	(Iran)	Javad Kazemian	5	1	0	6
5	9	MF	(Iran)	Maziar Zare	2	0	2	4
5	10	FW	(Iran)	Gholamreza Rezaei	2	2	0	4
7	23	MF	(Iran)	Amir Hossein Feshangchi	1	1	1	3
8	21	FW	(Iran)	Vahid Hashemian	3	0	0	3
8	24	FW	(Iran)	Hadi Norouzi	2	0	0	2
10	2	DF	(Iran)	Alireza Mohammad	1	0	0	1
10	6	DF	(Iran)	Mohammad Nosrati	1	0	0	1
10	11	MF	(Iran)	Hossein Badamaki	1	1	0	2
10	13	DF	(Iran)	Sheys Rezaei	0	0	1	1
10	20	DF	(Iran)	Alireza Noormohammadi	3	0	0	3
10	33	FW	(Iran)	Mehrdad Oladi	1	0	0	1
10	Own goal				1	0	0	1
TOTALS					43	10	5	58

Friendlies and Pre season goals are not recognized as competitive match goals.

=== Goalkeeping ===
			League			Hazfi Cup			Asian			Total		
No	N	Name	M	GA	CS	M	GA	CS	M	GA	CS	M	GA	CS
1	(Iran)	Alireza Haghighi	14	14	4	3	6	0	–	–	–	17	20	4
1	(Bosnia and Herzegovina)	Asmir Avdukić	–	–	–	–	–	–	7	8	1	7	8	1
22	(Iran)	Misagh Memarzadeh	14	25	1	–	–	–	–	–	–	14	25	1
38	(Iran)	Hossein Hooshyar	6	14	1	–	–	–	–	–	–	6	14	1
Total			34	53*	6	3	6	0	7	8	1	44	67	7

- The second-leg match against Damash was abandoned while Damash were leading 2-1 due to fans insulting the referee, and the Disciplinary Committee awarded Damash 3-0 victory. For this reason, two goals are counted in goalkeeper's goals-conceded statistics from this match.

=== Own goals ===
- Updated on 16 September 2011

Number	Nation	Position	Name	Pro League	Champions League	Hazfi Cup	Total
1	(Iran)	DF	Alireza Noormohammadi	0	0	1	1
TOTALS				0	0	1	1

=== Overall statistics ===
	Total	Home	Away	Neutral
Games played	33	17	15	0
Games won	13	6	7	0
Games drawn	12	6	6	0
Games lost	9	5	4	0
Biggest win	N/A	N/A	N/A	N/A
Biggest loss	N/A	N/A	N/A	N/A
Biggest win (League)	4-1	4-1	3-2	N/A
Biggest win (Cup)	3-2	2-1	3-2	N/A
Biggest win (Asia)	6-1	6-1	N/A	N/A
Biggest loss (League)	4-2	2-0	4-2	N/A
Biggest loss (Cup)	3-0	3-0	N/A	N/A
Biggest loss (Asia)	N/A	N/A	N/A	N/A
Goals scored	54	25	29	0
Goals conceded	44	20	24	0
Goal difference	+10	+5	+5	+0
Average GF per game	N/A	N/A	N/A	N/A
Average GA per game	N/A	N/A	N/A	N/A
Points	N/A	N/A	N/A	N/A
Winning rate	N/A	N/A	N/A	N/A
Most appearances	31	(Iran) Mohammad Nouri		
Top scorer	12	(Iran) Ali Karimi		
Top assister	7	(Iran) Gholamreza Rezaei		

Last updated: 30 March 2012
Source: Competitive matches

=== Disciplinary record ===
Includes all competitive matches. Players with 1 card or more included only.

Last updated on 4 April 2012

Ran	No.	Pos	Nat	Name	Iran Pro League			AFC Champions League			Hazfi Cup			Total		
Ran	No.	Pos	Nat	Name	Yellow card	(yellow card) (yellow-red card)	Red card	Yellow card	(yellow card) (yellow-red card)	Red card	Yellow card	(yellow card) (yellow-red card)	Red card	Yellow card	(yellow card) (yellow-red card)	Red card
1	9	MF	(Iran)	Maziar Zare	6	0	0	0	0	0	1	0	0	7	0	0
1	11	MF	(Iran)	Hossein Badamaki	6	0	0	0	0	0	1	0	0	7	0	0
1	20	DF	(Iran)	Alireza Noormohammadi	5	1	0	0	0	0	1	0	0	6	1	0
4	8	MF	(Iran)	Ali Karimi	4	0	1	1	0	0	0	0	0	5	0	1
5	10	FW	(Iran)	Gholamreza Rezaei	5	0	0	0	0	0	0	0	0	5	0	0
5	17	FW	(Iran)	Javad Kazemian	4	0	0	0	0	0	1	0	0	5	0	0
7	15	MF	(Iran)	Saman Aghazamani	4	0	0	0	0	0	0	0	0	4	0	0
7	33	FW	(Iran)	Mehrdad Oladi	3	0	1	0	0	0	0	0	0	3	0	1
9	30	DF	(Burkina Faso)	Mamadou Tall	2	0	0	0	0	0	1	0	0	3	0	0
10	6	DF	(Iran)	Mohammad Nosrati	2	0	0	0	0	0	0	0	0	2	0	0
10	7	MF	(Iran)	Hamidreza Aliasgari	2	0	0	0	0	0	0	0	0	2	0	0
10	14	MF	(Iran)	Mohammad Nouri	1	0	0	0	0	0	1	0	0	2	0	0
10	18	DF	(Iran)	Ebrahim Shakouri	2	0	0	0	0	0	0	0	0	2	0	0
10	22	GK	(Iran)	Misagh Memarzadeh	2	0	0	0	0	0	0	0	0	2	0	0
10	23	MF	(Iran)	Amirhossein Feshangchi	0	0	0	1	0	0	1	0	0	0	1	1
10	24	FW	(Iran)	Hadi Norouzi	1	1	0	0	0	0	0	0	0	1	1	0
17	1	GK	(Iran)	Alireza Haghighi*	1	0	0	0	0	0	0	0	0	1	0	0
17	2	DF	(Iran)	Alireza Mohammad	1	0	0	0	0	0	0	0	0	1	0	0
17	4	DF	(Iran)	Mojtaba Shiri	1	0	0	0	0	0	0	0	0	1	0	0
17	12	FW	(Libya)	Éamon Zayed	0	0	0	1	0	0	0	0	0	1	0	0
17	13	DF	(Iran)	Sheys Rezaei	1	0	0	0	0	0	0	0	0	1	0	0
17	21	FW	(Iran)	Vahid Hashemian	1	0	0	0	0	0	0	0	0	1	0	0
TOTALS					52	2	2	2	0	0	7	0	0	62	2	2

Last updated: 4 April 2012
Source: Competitive matches and IPLStats.com
Ordered by (red card) , (second yellow card) and (yellow card)
(yellow card) = Number of bookings; (second yellow card) = Number of sending offs after a second yellow card; (red card) = Number of sending offs by a direct red card.

* Players who no longer play for Persepolis's current season

== Club ==
=== Kit ===
Supplier: (Germany) Uhlsport
Sponsor(s): Tehran Municipality, OPEL

Home Kit	Away Kit	Third Kit

Source: "Persepolis FC' current kit". Archived from the original on 2010-01-29.

=== Official sponsors ===
(Germany) Opel • (Germany) Uhlsport • Iran Aseman Airlines • Sadra Khodro

• Damavand Mineral Water Co.

Source: Persian

=== Coaching staff ===
Position	Staff
Head coach	(Turkey) Mustafa Denizli
Assistant coach	(Iran) Mohsen Ashouri
Goalkeeper coach	(Bosnia and Herzegovina) Enver Lugušić
Analyzer	(Iran) Nasser Sadeghi
Team Manager	(Iran) Mohammad Zadmehr

==== Estili's coaching staff ====
Position	Staff
Head coach	(Iran) Hamid Estili
Assistant coach	(Germany) Ralf Zumdick
Assistant coach	(Iran) Mohsen Ashouri
Goalkeeper coach	(Armenia) Harutyun Abrahamyan
Analyzer	(Iran) Mehdi Hosseini Nasab
Fitness Trainer	(Serbia) Srđan Gemaljević
Technical Adviser	(Iran) Bijan Azizi
Scout	(Iran) Karim Bagheri
Team Manager	(Iran) Mahmoud Khordbin

=== Other information ===
Chairman	(Iran) Mohammad Rouyanian
Deputy Chairman	(Iran) Jamshid Zare
Adviser Chairman	(Iran) Sajjad Najafi
Football Academy President	(Iran) Mohammad Hasan Alami
Psychologist	(Iran) Dr.Faraj Zade
Media Officer	(Iran) Reza Riazati
Media Supervisor	(Iran) Hamidreza Gharib
Disciplinarian Committee Ruler	(Iran) Mahmoud Salarkia
Assistant Legal	(Iran) Mostafa Shokri
Official Website	(Iran) Mosa Hosseini
Ground (capacity and dimensions)	Azadi Stadium (100,000 / 110x75 meters)
Training ground	Derafshifar Stadium

Updated to match played 20 September 2011
Source: fc-perspolis.com

Board of Directions
(Iran) Mohammad Rouyanian (Chairman)
(Iran) Ali Parvin
(Iran) Mohammad Panjali
(Iran) Lotfollah Forouzande Dehkordi
(Iran) Mohammad Hossein Nejadfallah

Technical Committee
(Iran) Ali Parvin
(Iran) Mahmoud Khordbin
(Iran) Mohammad Zadmehr

Medico Committee
(Iran) Professor Farhad Farid
(Iran) Dr. Majid Laelroshan
(Iran) Dr. Babak Zargar Amini
(Iran) Dr. Amir Hossein Barati
(Iran) Dr. Mohammad Taban
(Iran) Dr. Darioush Soudi

Munition Team
(Iran) Ghasem Abdolsamadi
(Iran) Asghar Norouzali

Updated to match played 19 August 2011
Source: fc-perspolis.com
|}

== See also ==
- 2011–12 Persian Gulf Cup
- 2011–12 Hazfi Cup
- 2012 AFC Champions League
