= 2011 Hazfi Cup final =

- Event: 2010-11 Hazfi Cup
| Persepolis | Malavan |
| 4 | 3 |

First leg
| Persepolis | Malavan |
| 4 | 2 |
- Date: June 07, 2011
- Venue: Azadi Stadium, Tehran
- Referee: Alireza Faghani
- Attendance: 82,300

Second leg
| Malavan | Persepolis |
| 1 | 0 |
- Date: June 10, 2011
- Venue: Takhti Stadium, Bandar Anzali
- Referee: Hedayat Mombeini
- Attendance: 20,000

The 2011 Hazfi Cup final was a two-legged football tie in order to determine the 2010–11 Hazfi Cup champion of Iranian football clubs. Persepolis faced Malavan in this final game. The first leg took place on June 7, 2011 at 19:45 IRDT (UTC+4:30) at Azadi Stadium in Tehran and the second leg took place on June 10, 2011 at 17:00 local time (UTC+4:30) at Takhti Stadium, Bandar Anzali.

== Format ==
The rules for the final were exactly the same as the one for the previous knockout rounds. The tie was contested over two legs with away goals deciding the winner if the two teams were level on goals after the second leg. If the teams could still not be separated at that stage, then extra time would have been played with a penalty shootout (taking place if the teams were still level after that).

== Road to the finals ==
| Persepolis | | | | Round | Malavan |
|---|---|---|---|---|---|---|---|---|
| Opponent | Result | H/A | Persepolis goalscorers | Second stage | Opponent | Result | H/A | Malavan goalscorers |
| Naft Mahmoudabad | 5–1 | H | Shpejtim Arifi, Mohammad Nouri (2), Hadi Norouzi, Amir Hossein Feshangchi | 1/16 Final | Iranjavan | 3–2 | A | Pejman Nouri, Mohammed Nozhati, Mehrdad Oladi |
| Damash Gilan | 2–1 | A | Sepehr Heidari, Saeed Hallafi | 1/8 Final | Foolad Natanz | 3–0 | H | Mehrdad Oladi (3) |
| Sepahan Isfahan | 0–0 (4-2) | H | | Quarter-Final | Tractor Sazi | 0–0 (5-4) | A |
| Foolad | 1–0 | A | Vahid Hashemian | Semi-Final | Esteghlal | 2–1 | H | Hadi Tamini, Mehrdad Oladi |

== Final Summary ==
| Team 1 | Agg. | Team 2 | 1st leg | 2nd leg |
|---|---|---|---|---|
| Persepolis | 4-3 | Malavan | 4-2 | 0-1 |

=== Leg 1 ===
June 07, 2011
19:45 (UTC+4:30)

| Persepolis | 4–2 | Malavan |
|---|---|---|
| Alireza Noormohammadi 47'; Hadi Norouzi 63'; Mohammad Nouri 71,86(P)' | Report | Mohammad Rostami 34'; Mohammed Nozhati 69' |

Azadi Stadium, Tehran
Attendance: 82,300
Referee: Alireza Faghani

| Persepolis | Malavan |

Persepolis:
| GK | 1 | (Iran) Alireza Haghighi |
| CB | 4 | (Iran) Mojtaba Shiri |
| CB | 20 | (Iran) Alireza Noormohammadi |
| LB | 18 | (Iran) Ebrahim Shakouri | (yellow card) 59' |
| RB | 15 | (Iran) Saman Aghazamani | | (substituted off) 71' |
| DM | 9 | (Iran) Maziar Zare |
| SM | 26 | (Iran) Hamidreza Aliasgari |
| CM | 11 | (Iran) Hossein Badamaki | | (substituted off) 87' |
| AM | 14 | (Iran) Mohammad Nouri |
| SS | 24 | (Iran) Hadi Norouzi | (yellow card) 55' |
| CF | 21 | (Iran) Vahid Hashemian (c) | (yellow card) 22' | (substituted off) 64' |
Substitutes:
| RB | 2 | (Iran) Alireza Mohammad | (yellow card) 87' | (substituted in) 71' |
| FW | 8 | (Germany) Shpejtim Arifi | | (substituted in) 87' |
| SM | 23 | (Iran) Amir Hossein Feshangchi | | (substituted in) 64' |
Manager:
(Iran) Ali Daei

Malavan:
| GK | 22 | (Iran) Ali Hassani Sefat |
| DF | 14 | (Bosnia and Herzegovina) Alen Bašić | (yellow card) 45' |
| MF | 15 | (Iran) Saeed Salarzadeh |
| MF | 16 | (Iran) Ali Reza Ramezani |
| MF | 3 | (Iran) Abolhassan Jafari | (red card) 37' |
| MF | 21 | (Iran) Mohammad Rostami | (yellow card) 33' (yellow-red card) 88' |
| MF | 8 | (Iran) Pejman Nouri (c) |
| MF | 37 | (Iran) Mohsen Mosalman | (yellow card) 56' |
| MF | 25 | (Iran) Mehdi Daghagheleh | | (substituted off) 44' |
| MF | 18 | (Iran) Mohammed Nozhati | (yellow card) 62' |
| FW | 12 | (Iran) Mehrdad Oladi | | (substituted off) 78' |
Substitutes:
| DF | 4 | (Iran) Babak Pourgholami | | (substituted in) 44' |
| FW | 13 | (Iran) Mohammad Heidari | | (substituted in) 78' |
Manager:
(Iran) Farhad Pourgholami

=== Leg 2 ===
June 10, 2011
17:00 (UTC+4:30)

| Malavan | 1–0 | Persepolis |
|---|---|---|
| Mehrdad Oladi 19' | Report |

Takhti Stadium, Bandar Anzali
Attendance: 20,000
Referee: Hedayat Mombeini

| Malavan | Persepolis |

Malavan:
| GK | 22 | (Iran) Ali Hassani Sefat |
| DF | 6 | (Iran) Hadi Tamini | (yellow card) 83' |
| DF | 4 | (Iran) Babak Pourgholami | (yellow card) 45' |
| MF | 15 | (Iran) Saeed Salarzadeh |
| MF | 7 | (Iran) Mohammad Hamrang | (yellow card) 77' | (substituted off) 78' |
| MF | 8 | (Iran) Pejman Nouri (c) |
| MF | 37 | (Iran) Mohsen Mosalman |
| MF | 25 | (Iran) Mehdi Daghagheleh |
| MF | 16 | (Iran) Ali Reza Ramezani |
| FW | 13 | (Iran) Mohammad Heidari |
| FW | 12 | (Iran) Mehrdad Oladi |
Substitutes:
| DF | 13 | (Iran) Aziz Maeboudi | | (substituted in) 78' |
Manager:
(Iran) Farhad Pourgholami

Persepolis:
| GK | 1 | (Iran) Alireza Haghighi | (yellow card) 90' |
| CB | 4 | (Iran) Mojtaba Shiri | | (substituted off) 13' |
| CB | 20 | (Iran) Alireza Noormohammadi |
| LB | 18 | (Iran) Ebrahim Shakouri | | (substituted off) 83' |
| RB | 15 | (Iran) Saman Aghazamani |
| SM | 26 | (Iran) Hamidreza Aliasgari |
| AM | 14 | (Iran) Mohammad Nouri |
| CM | 11 | (Iran) Hossein Badamaki | (yellow card) 67' |
| DM | 9 | (Iran) Maziar Zare |
| FW | 21 | (Iran) Vahid Hashemian (c) | (yellow card) 77' |
| FW | 8 | (Germany) Shpejtim Arifi | | (substituted off) 53' |
Substitutes:
| CB | 3 | (Iran) Sepehr Heidari | | (substituted in) 13' |
| SM | 40 | (Iran) Saeid Hallafi | | (substituted in) 83' |
| SM | 23 | (Iran) Amir Hossein Feshangchi | | (substituted in) 53' |
Manager:
(Iran) Ali Daei

== Champions ==
Champions 2010–11 Hazfi Cup
Persepolis Tehran
Fifth title

== See also ==
- 2010–11 Persian Gulf Cup
- 2010–11 Azadegan League
- 2010–11 Iran Football's 2nd Division
- 2010–11 Iran Football's 3rd Division
- 2010–11 Hazfi Cup
- Iranian Super Cup
- 2010–11 Iranian Futsal Super League
