= 2011 Velayat International Cup =

Tournament details
- Host country: Iran
- Dates: 3–7 November
- Teams: 3 (from 2 confederations)
- Venue(s): 1 (in 1 host cities)

Final positions
- Champions: (Iran) Persepolis (1st title)
- Runners-up: (Paraguay) Nacional
- Third place: (Iran) Esteghlal

Tournament statistics
- Matches played: 3
- Goals scored: 6 (2 per match)
- Top scorer(s): (Iran) Hadi Norouzi (3 goals)

The 2011 Velayat Cup was a friendly football tournament that took place in Tehran in the Iran in November 2011.

== Participating teams ==
Totally 3 teams get permission to participate in the tournament "2011 Velayat Cup".

- Persepolis from ( Iran)
- Nacional from ( Paraguay)
- Esteghlal from ( Iran)

== Standings ==
Team	Pld	W	D	L	GF	GA	GD	Pts
(Iran) Persepolis	2	1	1	0	3	2	+1	4
(Paraguay) Nacional	2	1	0	1	1	1	0	3
(Iran) Esteghlal	2	0	1	1	2	3	−1	1

== Matches ==
3 November 2011
16:30 UTC+03:30

(Iran) Persepolis	1–0	(Paraguay) Nacional
Norouzi 85' (pen.) (yellow card); Feshangchi (yellow card)	FarsNews Report; Report	Miers (red card) 83'; Ramos (yellow card)

Azadi Stadium, Tehran, Iran
Attendance: 400
Referee: Ahmad Salehi
5 November 2011
16:30 UTC+03:30

Esteghlal (Iran)	0–1	(Paraguay) Nacional
Amirabadi (yellow card)	FarsNews Report; Report	Teixeira 65'

Azadi Stadium, Tehran, Iran
Attendance: 200
Referee: Alireza Faghani
7 November 2011
16:30 UTC+03:30

Persepolis (Iran)	2–2	(Iran) Esteghlal
Norouzi 7' (pen.) 46'; Memarzadeh (yellow card); Mamadou Tall (yellow card); Mohammad (yellow card) 80' (yellow-red card)	FarsNews Report; Report	Borhani 33'; Omranzadeh 70'; Shirzad (yellow card); Zandi (yellow card)

Azadi Stadium, Tehran, Iran
Attendance: 20,000
Referee: Saeid Mozaffari Zadeh

== Statistics ==
=== Top scorers ===
Position	Player	Club	Goals
1	(Iran) Hadi Norouzi	(Iran) Persepolis	3
2	(Iran) Arash Borhani	(Iran) Esteghlal	1
2	(Iran) Hanif Omranzadeh	(Iran) Esteghlal	1
2	(Brazil) Rodrigo Teixeira	(Paraguay) Nacional	1
_	OG		0
_	Penalty Goals		2
_	technical loses of 3–0		0
Total goals (Including technical loses)			6
Total games			3
Average per game			2

=== Cards ===
Position	Player	Club	Yellow card	Yellow card Red card	Red card	Total
1	(Iran) Alireza Mohammad	(Iran) Persepolis	1	1	0	2
2	(Paraguay) Marcos Miers	(Paraguay) Nacional	0	0	1	1
3	(Iran) Hadi Norouzi	(Iran) Persepolis	1	0	0	1
3	(Iran) Amir Hossein Feshangchi	(Iran) Persepolis	1	0	0	1
3	(Paraguay) Ramos	(Paraguay) Nacional	1	0	0	1
3	(Iran) Mehdi Amirabadi	(Iran) Esteghlal	1	0	0	1
3	(Iran) Misagh Memarzadeh	(Iran) Persepolis	1	0	0	1
3	(Burkina Faso) Mamadou Tall	(Iran) Persepolis	1	0	0	1
3	(Iran) Javad Shirzad	(Iran) Esteghlal	1	0	0	1
3	(Iran) Ferydoon Zandi	(Iran) Esteghlal	1	0	0	1
Total Cards			9	1	1	11

== See also ==
- 2011–12 Persian Gulf Cup
- 2011–12 Azadegan League
- 2011–12 Hazfi Cup
- 2011–12 Iran Football's 2nd Division
- 2011–12 Iran Football's 3rd Division
- Iranian Super Cup
- 2011–12 Iranian Futsal Super League
