= 2010–11 Hazfi Cup =

Tournament details
- Country: Iran
- Teams: 79

Final positions
- Champions: Persepolis
- Runners-up: Malavan

Tournament statistics
- Matches played: 79
- Goals scored: 234 (2.96 per match)

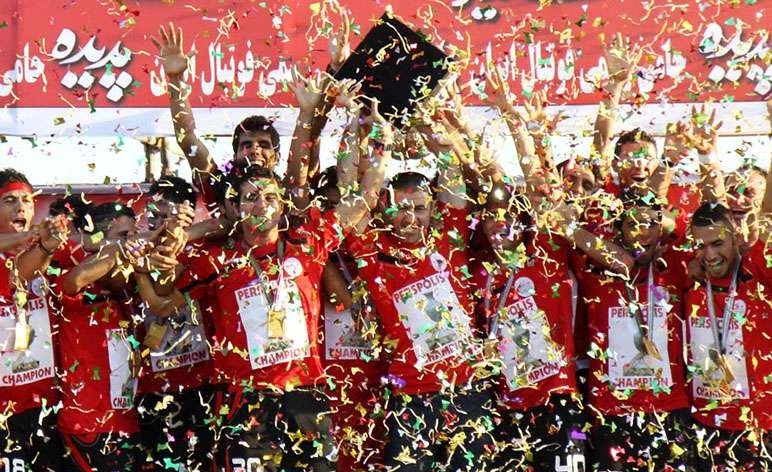
Persepolis players celebrate winning the 2010–11 Hazfi Cup

The 2010–11 Hazfi Cup was the 24th season of the Iranian football knockout competition.

Persepolis was the defending champion who managed to defend their title. Winning the cup earned qualification to the 2012 AFC Champions League.

== Participating teams ==
In total 79 teams participated in the 2010–11 season. The teams were divided into three main groups:

- 18 teams of the Iran Pro League: entering at the round of 32.
- 28 teams of the Azadegan League: entering at the second round.
- 33 teams from Provincial Leagues: entering at the first round.

== First stage ==
In the First Stage of “2010–11 Hazfi Cup”, 61 teams will be presented. In this stage three rounds will be done, and finally, 16 teams will be qualified for the Second Stage.

The first round will be started with 10 teams. From this round, 5 teams are allowed to go to the second round. These 5 teams together with the other 51 teams (totally 56 teams) will play in the second round. The winners of second round will play in the third round, and finally, 14 teams will go through the Second Stage (fourth round).

=== First round ===
Matches were played on 16 September 2010.

| No | Home team | Score | Away team |
|---|---|---|---|
| 1 | Almahdi Hormozgan | 0–0 | Shahrdari Ashkezar |
Shahrdari Ashkezar advance 5–3 on penalties.
| 2 | Keyvan Mahabad | 2–4 | Nabard Shahrekord |
| 3 | Pehnaei Ghayen | (w/o) | Shahrdari Gachsaran |
| 4 | Shahrdari Ashkhaneh | (w/o) | Shahrdari Sahneh |
| 5 | Omran Kish | 4–1 | Perspolis Dareshahr |

=== Second round ===
Matches were played between 16 September and 1 October 2010.

| No | Home team | Score | Away team |
|---|---|---|---|
| 6 | Heyat Bandar Torkaman | 1–2 | Naft Mahmoudabad |
| 7 | Shahrdari Kahnooj | 4–3 | Safir Varamin |
| 8 | Parsabad Moghan | 0–2 | Hekmati Tabriz |
| 9 | Damash Gilan | 4–0 | Milad Dezful |
| 10 | Shahrdari Ashkezar | (w/o) | Mehr Karaj |
| 11 | Mes Rafsanjan | 1–2 | Nassaji Mazandaran |
| 12 | Aluminium Hormozgan | (w/o) | Dartak Khoramabad |
| 13 | Hamyari Arak | 5–3 | Persepolis Kamyaran |
| 14 | Zobe-Felezat Hamedan | 2–3 | Shahrdari Bandar Abbas |
| 15 | Naft Ahvaz | 4–2 | Babakhani Tehran |
| 16 | Qezel Ozan Zanjan | (w/o) | Omran Kish |
| 17 | Pehnaei Ghayen | 3–1 | Shahrdari Ashkhaneh |
| 18 | Mes Sarcheshme | 1–1 | Foolad Natanz |
Foolad Natanz progress 4–3 on penalties.
| 19 | Moghavemat Sepasi | 3–0 | Heyat Football Isfahan |
| 20 | Etka Gorgan | 2–1 | Aboomoslem Khorasan |
| 21 | Nabard Shahrekord | 1–0 | Gostaresh Arak |
| 22 | Sanati Kaveh Tehran | (w/o) | Iran-khodro Kashmar |
| 23 | Panah-afarin Qom | 0–5 | Payam Mashhad |
| 24 | Daneshgah Saravan | (w/o) | Shirin Faraz Kermanshah |
| 25 | Takmehr Takestan | 1–7 | Foolad Yazd |
| 26 | Darousazi Sobhan Rasht | 0–1 | Machine Sazi Tabriz |
| 27 | Shahrdari Semnan | 2–4 | Sepidrood Rasht |
| 28 | Gostaresh Foolad Tabriz | 3–0 | Tarbiat Yazd |
| 29 | Iranjavan Bushehr | 2–1 | Naderi Bushehr |
| 30 | Esteghlal Ahvaz | 4–2 | Gol Gohar Sirjan |
| 31 | Behineh Rahbar Abadeh | (w/o) | Sanat Sari |
| 32 | Shahrdari Yasuj | 4–2 | Bargh Shiraz |
| 33 | Damash Lorestan | (w/o) | Payam Mokhaberat Shiraz |

=== Third round ===
Matches were on 12 and 13 October 2010.

| No | Home team | Score | Away team |
|---|---|---|---|
| 34 | Naft Mahmoudabad | (w/o) | Foolad Yazd |
| 35 | Shahrdari Ashkezar | 1–6 | Damash Gilan |
| 36 | Nassaji Mazandaran | 0–0 | Machine Sazi Tabriz |
Machine Sazi progress 5–3 on penalties.
| 37 | Sepidrood Rasht | 2–0 | Aluminium Hormozgan |
| 38 | Shahrdari Bandar Abbas | (w/o) | Hamyari Arak |
| 39 | Naft Ahvaz | 1–0 | Gostaresh Foolad Tabriz |
| 40 | Pehnaei Ghayen | 0–3 | Iranjavan Bushehr |
| 41 | Foolad Natanz | 5–3 | Esteghlal Ahvaz |
| 42 | Behineh Rahbar Abadeh | 4–0 | Daneshgah Saravan |
| 43 | Moghavemat Sepasi | 3–2 | Etka Gorgan |
| 44 | Nabard Shahrekord | 0–2 | Shahrdari Yasuj |
| 45 | Sanati Kaveh Tehran | 4–4 | Damash Lorestan |
Sanati Kaveh progress 5–3 on penalties.
| 46 | Hekmati Tabriz | 1–3 | Payam Mashhad |
| 47 | Omran Kish | 3–2 | Shahrdari Kahnooj |

== Second stage ==
The 18 teams from Iran Pro League entered into the Main Draw at the Round of 32.

=== Bracket ===
Round of 32
H | Persepolis | 5
A | Naft Mahmoudabad | 1
H | Damash Gilan | 3
A | Saipa | 1
H | Rah Ahan | (w/o)
A | Sanat Naft Abadan
H | Machine Sazi Tabriz | 1
A | Sepahan | 3
H | Foolad | 2
A | Sepidrood Rasht | 1
H | Shahrdari Bandar Abbas | 2
A | Saba | 1
H | Mes Kerman | 0
A | Naft Ahvaz | 1
H | Omran Kish | 2
A | Steel Azin | 3
H | Tractor Sazi | (w/o)
A | Moghavemat Sepasi
H | Shahrdari Tabriz | 6
A | Behineh Abadeh | 0
H | Foolad Natanz | 3
A | Naft Tehran | 2
H | Iranjavan Bushehr | 2
A | Malavan | 3
H | Zob Ahan | 0
A | Shahrdari Yasuj | 1
H | Paykan | 0(2)
A | Sanati Kaveh Tehran | 0(4)
H | Shahin Bushehr | (w/o)
A | Payam Mashhad
H | Pas Hamedan | 1
A | Esteghlal | 4

Round of 16
A | Persepolis | 2
H | Damash Gilan | 1
A | Rah Ahan | 0
H | Sepahan | 4
H | Foolad | (w/o)
A | Shahrdari Bandar Abbas
A | Naft Ahvaz | 1
H | Steel Azin | 2
A | Tractor Sazi | 5
H | Shahrdari Tabriz | 2
A | Foolad Natanz | 0
H | Malavan | 3
H | Shahrdari Yasuj | 1
A | Sanati Kaveh Tehran | 0
A | Shahin Bushehr | 0
H | Esteghlal | 1

Quarter-Final
H | Persepolis | 0(4)
A | Sepahan | 0(2)
A | Foolad | 2
H | Steel Azin | 0
H | Tractor Sazi | 0(4)
A | Malavan | 0(5)
A | Shahrdari Yasuj | 0
H | Esteghlal | 2

Semi-Final
A | Persepolis | 1
H | Foolad | 0
H | Malavan | 2
A | Esteghlal | 1

Final
Persepolis | 4 / 0 (agg. 4)
Malavan | 2 / 1 (agg. 3)

Note: H: Home team, A: Away team

=== Round of 32 ===
Matches were played between 19 and 20 October 2010, and on November 25, 2010.

| No | Home team | Score | Away team |
|---|---|---|---|
| 1 | Damash Gilan | 3–1 | Saipa |
| 2 | Rah Ahan | (w/o) | Sanat Naft Abadan |
| 3 | Machine Sazi Tabriz | 1–3 | Sepahan |
| 4 | Foolad | 2–1 | Sepidrood Rasht |
| 5 | Shahrdari Bandar Abbas | 2–1 | Saba |
| 6 | Mes Kerman | 0–1 | Naft Ahvaz |
| 7 | Iranjavan Bushehr | 2–3 | Malavan |
| 8 | Foolad Natanz | 3–2 | Naft Tehran |
| 9 | Tractor Sazi | (w/o) | Moghavemat Sepasi |
| 10 | Paykan | 0–0 | Sanati Kaveh Tehran |
Sanati Kaveh advance 5–4 on penalties.
| 11 | Pas Hamedan | 1–4 | Esteghlal |
| 12 | Shahin Bushehr | (w/o) | Payam Mashhad |
| 13 | Shahrdari Tabriz | 6–0 | Behineh Rahbar Abadeh |
| 14 | Persepolis | 5–1 | Naft Mahmoudabad |
| 15 | Omran Kish | 2–3 | Steel Azin |
| 16 | Zob Ahan Isfahan | 0–1 | Shahrdari Yasuj |

=== Round of 16 ===
Matches were played between 8 November and 13 December 2010.

| No | Home team | Score | Away team |
|---|---|---|---|
| 17 | Foolad | (w/o) | Shahrdari Bandar Abbas |
| 18 | Malavan | 3–0 | Foolad Natanz |
| 19 | Steel Azin | 2–1 | Naft Ahvaz |
| 20 | Esteghlal | 1–0 | Shahin Bushehr |
| 21 | Shahrdari Tabriz | 2–5 | Tractor Sazi |
| 22 | Damash Gilan | 1–2 | Persepolis |
| 23 | Sepahan | 4–0 | Rah Ahan |
| 24 | Shahrdari Yasuj | 1–0 | Sanati Kaveh Tehran |

=== Quarter-finals ===
Matches were played between 13 December 2010 and 29 May 2011.

| No | Home team | Score | Away team |
|---|---|---|---|
| 25 | Steel Azin | 0–2 | Foolad |
| 26 | Tractor Sazi | 0–0 | Malavan |
Malavan advance 5–4 on penalties.
| 27 | Esteghlal | 2–0 | Shahrdari Yasuj |
| 28 | Persepolis | 0–0 | Sepahan |
Persepolis advance 4–2 on penalties.

=== Semi-finals ===
Matches were played on 2 June 2011.

| No | Home team | Score | Away team |
|---|---|---|---|
| 29 | Malavan | 2–1 | Esteghlal |
| 30 | Foolad | 0–1 | Persepolis |

== Final ==
The final was played over two legs.

| Team 1 | Agg. | Team 2 | 1st leg | 2nd leg |
|---|---|---|---|---|
| Persepolis | 4–3 | Malavan | 4–2 | 0–1 |

=== Leg 1 ===
7 June 2011
19:45

| Persepolis | 4–2 | Malavan |
|---|---|---|
| Noormohammadi 47'; Norouzi 63'; Nouri 71', 86' (pen.) | Report | Rostami 34'; Nozhati 69' |

Azadi Stadium, Tehran
Attendance: 82,300
Referee: Alireza Faghani

=== Leg 2 ===
10 June 2011
17.00

| Malavan | 1–0 | Persepolis |
|---|---|---|
| Oladi 19' |

Takhti Stadium, Bandar Anzali
Attendance: 20,000
Referee: Hedayat Mombeini

== See also ==
- 2010–11 Persian Gulf Cup
- 2010–11 Azadegan League
- 2010–11 Iran Football's 2nd Division
- 2010–11 Iran Football's 3rd Division
- 2011 Hazfi Cup Final
- Iranian Super Cup
- 2010–11 Iranian Futsal Super League
