= Ali Jokar =

Iranian football defender (born 1983)

Personal information
- Full name: Ali Jokar
- Date of birth: September 1, 1983 (age 43)
- Place of birth: Shiraz, Iran
- Height: 1.65 m (5 ft 5 in)
- Position: Left back

Team information
- Current team: Al-Shahania
- Number: 13

Youth career
- Electronics Industries
- Hafez Shiraz
- Albadr Bandar Kong
- Fajr Sepasi

Senior career*
Years	Team	Apps	(Gls)
2010–2013	Umm Salal	18	(1)
2013–2014	Al-Shamal	5	(0)
2014–2018	Al-Shahania	19	(0)
- * Club domestic league appearances and goals

Ali Jokar (Persian: علی جوکار) is an Iranian football defender, who currently plays for Al-Shahania.

== Club career ==
=== Club career statistics ===
As of 9 February 2015

Club performance			League		Cup		Continental		Total	
Season	Club	League	Apps	Goals	Apps	Goals	Apps	Goals	Apps	Goals
Qatar			League		Emir Cup		Asia		Total	
2014–15	Al-Shahania	Qatar Stars League	14	0	1	0	–	–	15	0
Career total			14	0	1	0	–	–	15	0
