= Mansour Tanhaei =

Iranian footballer

Personal information
- Full name: Mansour Tanhaei
- Date of birth: March 31, 1986 (age 40)
- Place of birth: Qom, Iran
- Height: 1.81 m (5 ft 11 in)
- Position: Striker

Senior career*
Years	Team	Apps	(Gls)
2007–2009	Etka Gorgan	32	(9)
2009–2012	Shahin Bushehr	65	(12)
2012	Saipa	8	(0)
2013	Mes Kerman	7	(0)
2013–2014	Sanat Naft	13	(2)
2014–2015	Giti Pasand	17	(2)
2015–2016	Khoneh Be Khoneh	30	(6)
2016–2017	Saba Qom	9	(0)
2017–2018	Aluminium Arak	25	(7)
2018–2019	Arvand Khorramshahr	5	(1)
- * Club domestic league appearances and goals as of 3 September 2019

Mansour Tanhaei (Persian: منصور تنهایی; born March 31, 1986) is an Iranian football player.

== Club career ==
Tanhaei joined Shahin Bushehr in 2009 after spending the previous two seasons at Etka Gorgan F.C.

== Club career statistics ==
Last Update 14 June 2019

Club performance			League		Cup		Continental		Total	
Season	Club	League	Apps	Goals	Apps	Goals	Apps	Goals	Apps	Goals
Iran			League		Hazfi Cup		Asia		Total	
2007–08	Etka	Division 1		0			—			
2008–09	Etka	Division 1		9			—			
2009–10	Shahin	Pro League	14	2			—			
2010–11	Shahin	Pro League	23	3	1	0	—		24	3
2011–12	Shahin	Pro League	28	7			—			
2012–13	Saipa	Pro League	8	0			—			
2012–13	Mes Kerman	Pro League	7	0			—			
2013–14	Sanat Naft	Division 1	13	2			—			
2014–15	Giti Pasand	Division 1	17	2			—			
2015–16	Khoneh Be Khoneh	Division 1	30	6			—			
2016–17	Saba Qom	Pro League	9	0	0	0	—		9	0
2017–18	Aluminium Arak	Division 1	25	7			—			
2018–19	Arvand Khorramshahr	Division 1	5	1	0	0	—		5	1
Career total			211	39			—			

- Assist Goals

Season	Team	Assists
09–10	Shahin	1
10–11	Shahin	6
17–18	Aluminium Arak	1

== Honours ==
=== Club ===
- Hazfi Cup
  - Runner up:1
    - 2011–12 with Shahin Bushehr
