= Football Association of Iranian Club =

- Formation: August 4, 1998
- Type: Sports association
- Headquarters: Tehran, Iran
- Region served: Iran
- Members: 30 football clubs
- President: Ali Agha Mohammadi
- Secretary-General: Ali Mohammad Mortazavi
- Affiliations: FFIRI
- Website: irafc.org

== History ==
It was founded on 4 August 1998 in Tehran, Iran. Members of the association were the teams:

=== Iran Pro League ===
All 2011–12 Iran Pro League's teams. (18 teams)

=== Azadegan League ===
- Aboomoslem
- Esteghlal Ahvaz
- Bargh Shiraz
- Pas Hamedan
- Payam Mashhad
- Shirin Faraz
- Niroye Zamini
- Shemushack Noshahr
- Kowsar
- Mes Rafsanjan
- Steel Azin
- Paykan Qazvin

== Organization ==
The association is a member of the FFIRI and organizes a regional football league and cup.

== List of champions ==
- 2000 Bargh Shiraz U-21
- 2001 Homa
- 2002 Rah Ahan
- 2002^{1} Esteghlal
- 2003 Sepahan
- 2011 Persepolis
- 2019 Saipa

^{1}October

== Officials ==
- President: Ali Agha Mohammadi
- General Secretary: Ali Mohammad Mortazavi
- Councilor: Kazem Oliaei
- Media Officer: Mohammadreza Tehrani
- Treasurer: Abdolrahim Farid
- Technical Deputy: Ali Kazemi
- International Deputy : Ali Asghar Manoussifar

== President History ==
- Ali Agha Mohammadi (1998–2008)
- Mostafa Ajorlou (2008–2010)
- Azizollah Mohammadi (2010–2016)
- Ali Agha Mohammadi (2016–present)
