= Ali Targholizadeh =

Iranian football executive (born 1962)

Personal details
- Born: 17 June 1962 (age 64) Tehran, Iran
- Height: 1.77 m (5 ft 10 in)
- Occupation: Footballer (retired); Manager (retired); Futsal Director (retired); Head of International Affairs of the Iranian Football Association
Association football career
- Position: Midfielder
Youth career
- 1974–1977: Taj F.C.
- 1977–1978: Bank Melli F.C.
Senior career*
Years	Team	Apps	(Gls)
1979–1980	Karegaran F.C.		
1981–1987	Mazda F.C.		
1988–1992	Keshavarz F.C.		
Managerial career
- 1982–1986: Mazda F.C.
- 1988–1991: Keshavarz F.C.
- 1993–1995: Mehr Karaj F.C.
- 1996–1997: Entezameh Rey F.C.
- 1998–1999: Kosar F.C.
- 2002–2004: Sh. Tarasht F.C.
- * Club domestic league appearances and goals

Ali Targholizadeh (Persian:علی تارقلی زاده; born 17 June 1962) is an Iranian football executive. He was Asian Football Confederation's head of technical and Futsal department, and former clubs president in the leagues of Football Federation Islamic Republic of Iran as well as former FIFA and AFC, football and futsal instructor. For over 15 years, Targholizadeh has played in many Iranian football clubs such as Taj F.C., which is known as Esteghlal F.C. today, Bank Melli F.C. , Karegaran F.C., Mazda F.C., Keshavarz F.C. and Saazmaneh Goosht F.C.. In his early life in Iran, he has also managed teams such as Kosar F.C., Azerbaijan F.C. and Keshavarz F.C.. Targholizadeh has been a member of Asian Football Confederation since 2004 and is known as one of the oldest associates in the Asian House in Kuala Lumpur, Malaysia.

== Early life ==
Ali Targholizadeh was born on 17 June 1962, in Baharloo Hospital in Tehran, Iran. He is the second youngest child of Ozra Jak and Baba Targholizadeh, who owned a factory, retail store and a mechanic workshop. His family consists of him, two brothers and six elder sisters. He began elementary school at Shahpour Gholamreza Elementary School in 1969. Besides education, Targholizadeh focused mainly on sports such as Football and Volleyball. He also began working alongside his father and brothers in their family-owned factory and retail store at 17. After completing Elementary school in Shahpour Gholamreza, he moved to Shahaab Secondary School in Tehran, where he continued his education. He then entered Sanati 10 Technicom High School, where he studied Architecture till he graduated in 1979. Targholizadeh could not advance to a university after his high school graduation due to the Iranian Revolution in 1979, where all the schools and universities were shut down till 1981. He finally entered The University of Tehran after the schools and education facilities recommenced. His major was Religious Studies in The University of Tehran, which he quit after barely a year due to the lack of interest in the field. That was when he moved to Islamic Azad University of Tehran, where he studied Physical education in 1981. He graduated in 1984 and continued to work.

== Club career ==
Targholizadeh made his football debut in Taj F.C. Grass-root Soccer school U14 in the autumn of 1974 under the late manager Ali Danaeifard, where he spent three years, playing the very first official games of his life. He then moved to Bank Melli F.C. youth U16 team in 1977. After spending one year at the club, Targholizadeh joined Karegaran F.C. In 1979, where he spent another year. In 1981, Targholizadeh signed a contract with Mazda F.C.. He gradually gained a stable position in the club and decided to stay for six years. In 1987, he left Mazda F.C to join Saazmaneh Goosht F.C.. He spent four years playing for Saazmaneh Goosht F.C. which later converted its name to Keshavarz F.C.

== Coaching career ==
Besides playing for Mazda F.C. from 1981 to 1986, Targholizadeh simultaneously coached for the club's youth team from 1982 to 1986. In 1988, he coached both the youth and senior teams of Saazmaneh Goosht F.C.. In 1993, he accepted a job at Mehr Karaj F.C., which is called Saipa F.C. today and managed the club until 1995. He coached for Entezameh Rey F.C. of Tehran, from 1996 to 1997. In late 1998, Targholizadeh left Entezameh Rey F.C. to manage Kosar F.C. on a one-year contract. Finally, his final coaching years were with Shohadaye Tarasht F.C. from 2002 to 2004.

== Life In AFC ==
Ali Targholizadeh moved to Malaysia and began work as The Deputy Of the Technical Division in Asian Football Confederation in late 2004. He had the same role in Asian Football for three years.
In the beginning of 2007, Targholizadeh was promoted to the position of Asian Football Confederation's Director Of Futsal. Since 2007, Targholizadeh has been directing AFC Futsal Championship Tournaments which has been held in various Asian countries. Targholizadeh left the Asian Football Confederation in 2023 when he was appointed Head of International Affairs of the Iranian Football Association.

== Personal life ==
Targholizadeh practiced Islam since he was born. His parents were Muslims, just like most of the Iranian population after the Iranian Revolution. He has one elder and one younger brother, alongside six elder sisters, of which one has passed away. He married Maryam Eftekhari on 20 August 1990, in Tehran, Iran. He currently has four children, Mohsen, Mohammad, Majid and Hamidreza. Targholizadeh and his family moved to Malaysia in 2004 after he received an offer from the Asian Football Confederation in Kuala Lumpur.
