= Mohammad Amin Darvishi =

Iranian footballer

Personal information
- Date of birth: 20 May 1993 (age 33)
- Place of birth: Minab, Iran
- Height: 1.80 m (5 ft 11 in)
- Position: Forward

Youth career
- –2014: Albadr Bandar Kong

Senior career*
| Years | Team | Apps | (Gls) |
| 2012–2014 | Albadr Bandar Kong | 22 | (1) |
| 2014–2017 | Gostaresh Foulad | 72 | (5) |
| 2017–2018 | Sanat Naft | 22 | (0) |
| 2018–2019 | Gol Gohar Sirjan | 23 | (4) |
| 2019–2020 | Gol Reyhan Alborz | 29 | (6) |
| 2020–2022 | Paykan | 30 | (5) |
| 2022–2023 | Zob Ahan | 22 | (1) |
| 2023 | Mes Rafsanjan | 2 | (0) |
| 2024 | Shahin Bandar Ameri | 5 | (1) |
- * Club domestic league appearances and goals as of 10 June 2024

Mohammad Amin Darvishi (Persian: محمدامین درویشی; born 20 May 1993) is an Iranian football forward.

== Club career ==
=== Albadr Bandar Kong ===
Darvishi started his career with Albadr Bandar Kong from youth levels. He was promoted to first team in summer 2012. He was part of Albadr Bandar Kong in promoting to 2013–14 Azadegan League.

=== Gostaresh Foulad ===
He joined Gostaresh Foulad in summer 2014. He made his debut for Gostaresh Foulad on 19 August 2014 against Paykan as a substitute for Mehdi Nazari.

== Club career statistics ==
As of 11 December 2014.

| Club | Division | Season | League | | Hazfi Cup | | Asia | | Total | |
| Club | Division | Season | Apps | Goals | Apps | Goals | Apps | Goals | Apps | Goals |
|---|---|---|---|---|---|---|---|---|---|---|
| Albadr Bandar Kong | Division 1 | 2013–14 | 22 | 1 | 1 | 0 | – | – | 22 | 1 |
| Gostaresh Foulad | Pro League | 2014–15 | 11 | 2 | 2 | 1 | – | – | 13 | 3 |
| Career totals | | | 33 | 3 | 3 | 1 | 0 | 0 | 36 | 4 |
