= Alireza Ramezani =

Alireza Ramezani may refer to:

- Alireza Ramezani (footballer, born 1984), Iranian football midfielder who plays for Malavan
- Alireza Ramezani (footballer, born 1993), Iranian football player who plays for Esteghlal
