= Heyat Football Isfahan F.C. =

Iranian football club

Heyat Football Isfahan Football Club is an Iranian football club based in Isfahan, Iran.

== Season-by-Season ==
The table below shows the achievements of the club in various competitions.

Season	League	Position	Hazfi Cup	Notes
2009–10	Isfahan Provincial League	1st
2010–11	Isfahan Provincial League		2nd Round

== See also ==
- Hazfi Cup 2010–11
