= Datis Lorestan F.C. =

Iranian football club

- Full name: Datis Lorestan Football Club
- Founded: 2008; 9 years ago
- Ground: Takhti Stadium, Khoramabad
- Capacity: 20,000
- Head Coach: (Iran) Saeid Seopahvand
- League: 2nd Division

Datis Lorestan Football Club is an Iranian football club based in Khoramabad, Iran. They currently compete in the 2011–12 Iran Football's 2nd Division.

== Season-by-Season ==
The table below shows the achievements of the club in various competitions.

Season	League	Position	Hazfi Cup	Notes
2010–11	3rd Division	2nd/Group B	Did not qualify	Promoted
2011–12	2nd Division	7th/Group B	First Round
2012–13	2nd Division	13th/Group B		Relegated

== See also ==
- 2011-12 Hazfi Cup
- 2011–12 Iran Football's 2nd Division
