= Persepolis Kamyaran F.C. =

Iranian football club

- Full name: Persepolis Kamyaran Football Club
- Short name: Persepolis Kamyaran
- Ground: Kamyaran Stadium, Kamyaran, Iran
- Capacity: 5,000
- Head Coach: (Iran) Ghasem Rostami
- League: Iran Football's 3rd Division
- 2009–10: Champions
| Home colours | Away colours |

Persepolis Kamyaran Football Club is an Iranian football club based in Kamyaran, Iran.

== Season-by-Season ==
The table below chronicles the achievements of Persepolis Ganaveh in various competitions since 2010.

| Season | League | Position | Hazfi Cup | Notes |
|---|---|---|---|---|
| 2009–10 | Kurdistan Provincial League | 1st |
| 2010–11 | Kurdistan Provincial League | | 2nd Round |
| 2011–12 | Kurdistan Provincial League | | 1st Round |

== Head coaches ==
- (Iran) Ghasem Rostami
