= Salafchegan Qom F.C. =

Iranian football club

Salafchegan Qom Football Club is an Iranian football club based in Qom, Iran. They currently compete in the 2011–12 Hazfi Cup.

== Season-by-season ==
The table below shows the achievements of the club in various competitions.

Season	League	Position	Hazfi Cup	Notes
2011–12	Provincial League		First Round

== See also ==
- 2011–12 Hazfi Cup
