= Hafari Ahvaz F.C. =

Iranian football club

Hafari Ahvaz
- Full name: Hafari Ahvaz Football Club
- Ground: Takhti Stadium; Ahvaz, Iran
- Capacity: 30,000
- Chairman: (Iran) Ali Asghar Mombeini
- Head Coach: (Iran) Shahram Gholami
- League: 3rd Division
- 2015–16: 3rd Division Group C, 3rd

Hafari Ahvaz Football Club is an Iranian football club based in Ahvaz, Iran. They are part of the Melli Haffari Company Ahvaz Sports Club, and they currently compete in the Azadegan League.

== History ==
In the 2010–11 3rd Division season, Hafari finished first in group two and was promoted to the 2nd Division. The following year they finished second in group one of the 2nd Division and were promoted to the Azadegan League. The following year they were relegated back to the 2nd Division.

== Players ==
As of November 24, 2012

=== First-team squad ===
Note: Flags indicate national team as defined under FIFA eligibility rules; some limited exceptions apply. Players may hold more than one non-FIFA nationality.

No.	Pos.	Nation	Player
—	MF	IRN	Farhad Alekhamis
—	DF	IRN	Ali Bakhtiarizadeh
—	MF	IRN	Hossein Bakhtiarizadeh
—		IRN	Mostafa Bayat
—		IRN	Morteza Ben Mohsen
—	FW	IRN	Mostafa Bijani
—	DF	IRN	Ahmad CheharLangi
—	FW	IRN	Ahmad Davoodi
—		IRN	Mansoor Gharibi
—	FW	IRN	Behzad Gholami
—		IRN	Mahmood Hajipour

No.	Pos.	Nation	Player
—		IRN	Amin Jafaripour
—	FW	IRN	Ebrahim Lotfizadeh
—	DF	IRN	Moslem Mahmoodi
—		IRN	Morteza Mansoori
—	MF	IRN	Yaghoob Moosavi
—	MF	IRN	Siyamak Nemati
—		IRN	Mostafa Noroozi
—	DF	IRN	Amin Rabiei
—	MF	IRN	Rasool Ramezani
—	DF	IRN	Milad Safi Khani
—	GK	IRN	Ebrahim Sheikhi Nasab

== Season-by-season ==
The table below shows the achievements of the club in various competitions.

Season	League	Position	Hazfi Cup	Notes
2010–11	3rd Division	1st/Group B	Did not qualify	Promoted
2011–12	2nd Division	2nd/Group A	Third Round	Promoted
2012–13	Azadegan League	12th/Group B	1/16 Final	Relegated
2013–14	2nd Division	3rd/Group B	Fourth Round
2014–15	2nd Division	10th/Group B	Third Round	Relegated
2015–16	3rd Division	3RD/Group C

== See also ==
- Sherkat Melli Haffari Futsal Club
- 2011-12 Hazfi Cup
- 2011–12 Iran Football's 2nd Division
