= Ariyana Gostar Kish F.C. =

Iranian football club

Ariyana Gostar Kish
- Full name: Ariyana Gostar Kish F.C.
- Founded: 2009
- Ground: Kish Olympic Stadium
- Capacity: 5,000
- League: Hormozgan Provincial Leagues

Ariyana Gostar Kish Football Club is an Iranian football club based in Kish, Iran.

The club was established in 2009. They competed in the 2009–10 Iran Football's 3rd Division. They reached the Second Round, where they were placed in the 2nd/Group C, and finally they were promoted for the 2010–11 Iran Football's 2nd Division.

They competed in the 2010–11 Iran Football's 2nd Division. In 2011, the license of the club in 2nd Division League was bought by Badr Hormozgan.

== Season-by-Season ==
The table below shows the achievements of the club in various competitions.

Season	League	Position	Hazfi Cup	Notes
2009–10	3rd Division	2nd/Group C	Did not qualify	Promoted
2010–11	2nd Division	3rd/Group B	Did not qualify

== See also ==
- Hazfi Cup
- Iran Football's 2nd Division 2010–11
