= Sanaye Giti Pasand F.C. =

Iranian football club

Giti Pasand F.C.
- Full name: Sanaye Giti Pasand Isfahan Football Club
- Nickname: Giti Pasand
- Founded: 8 July 2010; 7 years ago
- Dissolved: 2016
- Ground: Daneshgah Azad Mobarake, Mobarakeh, Isfahan
- Capacity: 9,000
- Owner: Sanaye Giti Pasand
- Chairman: Ali Jannati
- Head Coach: Vahik Torosian
- League: Football's 2nd Division
- 2015–16: Azadegan League, 18th (relegated)
- Website: http://www.news.sgpco.com/

Sanaye Giti Pasand Isfahan Football Club is an Iranian football club based in Isfahan, Iran. They currently compete in the Azadegan League.

== Season-by-season ==
The table below shows the achievements of the club in various competitions.

Season	League	Position	Hazfi Cup	Notes
2010–11	3rd Division	3rd/Group B	Did not qualify	Promoted
2011–12	2nd Division	8th/Group A	Third round
2012–13	2nd Division	2nd/Group A	Did not qualify	Promoted
2013–14	1st Division	5th/Group A	Fourth round
2014–15	1st Division	7th/Group A	Third round

== Achievements ==
=== Domestic ===
- Iran Football's 2nd Division:
  - Promoted (1): 2012–13
- Iran Football's 3rd Division:
  - Promoted (1): 2010–11

== Highlights ==
Giti Pasand was established in 2010 their first year they promoted to 2nd Division and were on a great form with good spending and buying players from other leagues. In a one-year gap Giti Pasand promoted to Azadegan League, with scoring the second most in the league.

== See also ==
- 2011–12 Hazfi Cup
- 2011–12 Iran Football's 2nd Division
- Giti Pasand Futsal Club
- Giti Pasand Novin Futsal Club
