= Ali Hassani Sefat =

Iranian professional football player

Personal information
- Full name: Seyyed Ali Hassani Sefat
- Place of birth: Bandar-e Anzali, Iran
- Position: Goalkeeper

Team information
- Current team: Malavan (goalkeepers coach)

Youth career
- Malavan

Senior career*
Years	Team	Apps	(Gls)
2001–2009	Malavan	41	(0)
2009–2010	Petrochimi Tabriz	13	(0)
2010–2013	Malavan	51	(0)
2013–2016	Aluminium Hormozgan	15	(0)

Managerial career
- 2018–2022: Malavan (goalkeepers coach)
- 2024–: Malavan (goalkeepers coach)
- * Club domestic league appearances and goals

Ali Hassani Sefat is an Iranian professional football coach and a former player who is the goalkeepers coach with Malavan.

== Career ==
Hassani Sefat joined Malavan in 2010 after spending the previous season at Petrochimi Tabriz in the Azadegan League.

Club performance			League		Cup		Continental		Total	
Season	Club	League	Apps	Goals	Apps	Goals	Apps	Goals	Apps	Goals
Iran			League		Hazfi Cup		Asia		Total	
2005–06	Malavan	Pro League	0	0	0	0	0	0	0	0
2006–07	Malavan	Pro League	8	0	0	0	0	0	0	0
2007–08	Malavan	Pro League	10	0	0	0	0	0	0	0
2008–09	Malavan	Pro League	0	0	0	0	0	0	0	0
2009–10	Petrochimi	Division 1	13	0		0	-	-		0
2010–11	Malavan	Pro League	15	0	0	0	-	-	0	0
2011–12	Malavan	Pro League	25	0	0	0	-	-	0	0
2012–13	Malavan	Pro League	1	0	0	0	-	-	0	0
Career total			72	0		0	0	0		0

== External sources ==
- Profile at Persianleague
