= Amir Hossein Feshangchi =

Iranian football midfielder and coach

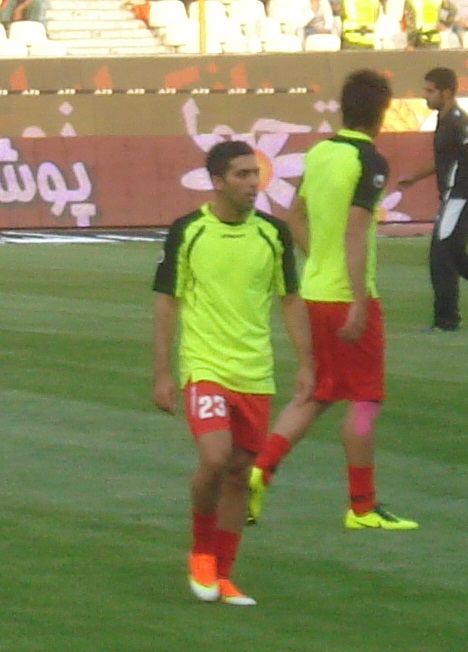
- Feshangchi with Persepolis in 2013

Personal information
- Full name: Amir Hossein Feshangchi
- Date of birth: 7 January 1987 (age 39)
- Place of birth: Tehran, Iran
- Height: 1.75 m (5 ft 9 in)
- Positions: Left winger; left back

Youth career
- 1999–2005: Persepolis

Senior career*
Years	Team	Apps	(Gls)
2005–2010	Saba Battery	79	(5)
2010–2013	Persepolis	69	(7)
2013–2014	Malavan	24	(1)
2014–2015	Paykan	23	(1)
2015–2016	Foolad	22	(1)
2016–2017	Khooneh Be Khooneh	27	(1)
2017–2018	Naft Tehran	25	(1)
2018–2019	Sorkhpooshan Pakdasht	10	(0)
2019–2021	Havadar	42	(6)

International career^{‡}
2009–2012	Iran	4	(0)

Managerial career
- 2019–2020: Sorkhpooshan Pakdasht (player-manager)
- * Club domestic league appearances and goals as of 30 September 2021 ‡ National team caps and goals as of 23 February 2012

Amir Hossein Feshangchi (Persian: امیرحسین فشنگچی, born 7 January 1987 in Tehran, Iran) is an Iranian football midfielder.

== Club career ==
=== Persepolis ===
He joined Persepolis in summer 1999 as a youth player. He started his professional career with Saba in 2005. He played five seasons for Saba and moved to Persepolis in the summer of 2010 and was used as left winger, and left back. In 2012, he extended his contract with Persepolis for three years, keeping him in the team till 2015.

=== Malavan ===
He transferred to Malavan in the summer of 2013. In his first and only season with Malavan, Feshangchi made 27 appearances and led the league in assists with 11, helping Malavan to a high table finish.

=== Paykan ===
Feshanghchi signed a two-year contract with Paykan on 10 June 2014. He made his debut in a match against Sepahan, where Paykan lost the match 2–0.

=== Club career statistics ===
As of 30 August 2014

Club	Division	Season	League		Hazfi Cup		Asia		Total	
Club	Division	Season	Apps	Goals	Apps	Goals	Apps	Goals	Apps	Goals
Saba	Pro League	2005–06	1	0	0	0	0	0	1	0
Saba	Pro League	2006–07	1	0	0	0	–	–	1	0
Saba	Pro League	2007–08	13	1	0	0	–	–	13	1
Saba	Pro League	2008–09	32	1	4	0	4	0	40	1
Saba	Pro League	2009–10	32	3	4	0	–	–	36	3
Persepolis	Pro League	2010–11	28	4	6	1	6	0	40	5
Persepolis	Pro League	2011–12	23	1	3	1	6	1	32	3
Persepolis	Pro League	2012–13	18	2	3	0	–	–	21	2
Malavan	Pro League	2013–14	22	2	2	0	–	–	22	2
Paykan	Pro League	2014–15	23	1	0	0	–	–	23	1
Foolad	Pro League	2015–16	22	1	0	0	–	–	22	1
Khoneh Be Khoneh	Azadegan League	2016-17	27	1	0	0	–	–	27	1
Career Total			241	17	22	2	16	1	279	20

- Assist Goals

Season	Team	Assists
2009–10	Saba	4
2010–11	Persepolis	6
2011–12	Persepolis	0
2012–13	Persepolis	1
2013–14	Malavan	10
2014–15	Paykan	0

== International career ==
In 2009, Feshangchi made his debut for Iran in a friendly match against Iceland.

== Honours ==
Persepolis

- Hazfi Cup: 2010–11; Runner-up 2012–13

Individual

- Iran Pro League top goal assistant: 2013–14
