= 2010 Velayat International Cup =

The 2010 Velayat International Cup (Persian: جام بین المللی ولایت) was a football tournament held in Iran that was played in Tehran

== Group A ==
Pos	Team	Pld	W	D	L	GF	GA	GD	Pts
1	(Iran) Saipa	2	1	1	0	7	1	+6	4
2	(Iran) Rah Ahan	2	1	1	0	4	1	+3	4
3	(Iran) Persepolis	2	0	0	2	0	9	−9	0

2010/10/17
21:00 UTC+04:30

Persepolis F.C. (Iran)	0–6	(Iran) Saipa
	report	Abbas Mohammad Rezaei 9', 60', 74', 83'; Sajjad Shahbazzadeh 24'; Jaber Ansari 32'

Azadi Stadium
2010/10/19
17:30 UTC+04:30

Persepolis F.C. (Iran)	0–3	(Iran) Rah Ahan
	report	Mohsen Mirabi 33'; Bahador Abdi 46'; Cícero Ricardo de Souza 53'

Takhti Stadium (Tehran)
2010/10/21
17:30 UTC+04:30

Saipa (Iran)	1–1	(Iran) Rah Ahan
Amin Manouchehri 56'	report	Cícero Ricardo de Souza 90+4'

Takhti Stadium (Tehran)

== Group B ==
Pos	Team	Pld	W	D	L	GF	GA	GD	Pts
1	Iran U-23	2	1	1	0	6	1	+5	4
2	(Iran) Esteghlal U23	2	1	1	0	1	0	+1	4
3	(Iran) Naft Tehran	2	0	0	2	1	7	−6	0

2010/10/17
18:30 UTC+04:30

Esteghlal U23 (Iran)	0–0	Iran U-23
	report

Takhti Stadium (Tehran)
2010/10/19
19:45 UTC+04:30

Naft Tehran (Iran)	1–6	Iran U-23
Sajjad Feizollahi 81'	report	Iman Mousavi 5', 22'; Hossein Ebrahimi 18'; Kamal Kamyabinia 41'; Mohsen Mosalman 64' (P); Mehdi Daghagheleh 83'

Takhti Stadium (Tehran)
2010/10/21
19:45 UTC+04:30

Esteghlal U23 (Iran)	1–0	(Iran) Naft Tehran
Mojtaba Mahboub Mojaz 90'	report

Takhti Stadium (Tehran)

== Final ==
2010/10/23
19:45 UTC+04:30

Iran U-23	2–0	(Iran) Saipa
Hamidreza Ali Asgari 8'; Mohsen Mosalman 14'	report

Takhti Stadium (Tehran)

== Top goalscorers ==
- Abbas Mohammad Rezaei (4 goals)
