= 2010–11 Iran Football's 3rd Division =

Iran Football's 3rd Division
- Season: 2010–11
- Champions: Mehr Karaj
- Promoted: Mehr Karaj; Naft Mahmoudabad; Hafari Ahvaz; Datis Lorestan; Almahdi Hormozgan; Gitipasand Isfahan
- Matches: 815
- Goals: 2,287 (2.81 per match)
- Top goalscorer: Rasoul Nazem-Roaya (23)

The following is the standings of the 3rd Division's 2010/11 football season started from 15 October 2010 and ended on 15 Juni, 2011. This is the 4th rated football competition in Iran after the Azadegan League, Persian Gulf Cup and 2nd Division.

== Teams ==
In total, 70 teams will compete in 6 groups. From the First Round 12 teams go through the Second Round.

=== Group 1 ===
Team	City
Alborz Qazvin	Qazvin
Asto Abyek Qazvin	Qazvin
Chichest Orumiyeh	Orumiyeh
Entezam Tehran	Tehran
Kapourchal Bandar Anzali	Bandar Anzali
Pasargad Novin Tehran	Tehran
Setareh Sorkh Zanjan	Zanjan
Shahin Tehran	Tehran
Shahrdari Lahijan	Lahijan
Shahrdari Novin Tabriz	Tabriz
Shams Khoy	Khoy
Zoratkaran Parsabad	Ardebil

=== Group 3 ===
Team	City
Abfa Tehran	Tehran
Aria Sepahan Qom	Qom
Eram Saze Qom	Qom
Gitipasand Isfahan	Isfahan
Hepco Arak	Arak
Hoodkan Babakhani Tehran	Tehran
Maharat Mehdishahr	Mehdishahr
Mehr Karaj	Karaj
Payam Babol	Babol
Sepahan Novin	Isfahan
Shahrdari Javid Karaj	Karaj
Talash Nazarabad	Nazarabad

=== Group 5 ===
Team	City
Almahdi Novin Hormozgan	Bandar Abbas
Khatam Ardakan	Ardakan
Mes Novin Kerman	Kerman
Mes Shahr-e Babak	Shahr-e Babak
Nazsaram Meybod	Meybod
Niroogah Iranshahr	Iranshahr
Omid Seramic Meybod	Meybod
Paas Birjand	Birjand
Persepolis Zahedan	Zahedan
Sanaye Ardakan	Ardakan
Shahrdari Ghayen	Ghayen
Shahrdari Zarand	Zarand

=== Group 2 ===
Team	City
Ashayer Noor	Noor
Dehdari Mashhad	Mashhad
Faraghi Bandar Torkaman	Bandar Torkaman
Heyat Football Kashmar	Kashmar
Heyat Football Khorasan Shomali	Bojnourd
Keshavarz Golestan	Gorgan
Naft Mahmoudabad	Mahmoudabad
Naftoon Tehran	Tehran
Persepolis Qaem Shahr	Qaem Shahr
Rah Ahan Novin	Shahr-e-Rey
Shahrdari Eslamshahr	Eslamshahr
Shahrdari Behshahr	Behshahr

=== Group 4 ===
Team	City
Ara-e Gharb Kermanshah	Kermanshah
Dartak Khoramabad	Khoramabad
Datis Lorestan	Khoramabad
Ehsan Sepid Nahavand	Nahavand
Esteghlal Hamedan	Hamedan
Kheibar Pol-e-Dokhtar	Pol-e-Dokhtar
Moghavemat Mokerian Mahabad	Mahabad
Ouraz Marivan	Marivan
Palayesh Gaz Ilam	Ilam
Shahrdari Shazand	Shazand
Vahdat Ivan-e-gharb	Ivan-e-gharb

=== Group 6 ===
Team	City
Ashayer Kohgiluyeh	Yasuj
Bahman Shiraz	Shiraz
Boroojen Foolad Charmahal	Boroojen
Esteghlal Dehdasht	Dehdasht
Hafari Ahvaz	Ahvaz
Kargar Boneh-Gez Tangestan	Tangestan
Khadamat va Omran Kish	Kish
Milad Dezful	Dezful
Persepolis Shiraz	Shiraz
Saipa Borazjan	Borazjan
Shahrdari Dezful	Dezful

== First Round (standings) ==
=== Group 1 ===
Pos	Team	Pld	W	D	L	GF	GA	GD	Pts	Qualification or relegation
1	Sh. Lahijan	22	12	7	3	42	25	+17	43	Promoted Second Round
2	Entezam Tehran	22	12	6	4	38	15	+23	42	Promoted Second Round
3	Zoratkaran Parsabad	22	12	5	5	39	24	+15	41	
4	Shahin Tehran	22	11	7	4	34	20	+14	40	
5	Kapourchal Bandar Anzali	22	11	7	4	26	15	+11	40	Relegation to Provincial Leagues
6	Shams Khoy	22	9	8	5	29	25	+4	35	Relegation to Provincial Leagues
7	Alborz Qazvin	22	8	6	8	26	25	+1	30	Relegation to Provincial Leagues
8	Chichest Orumiyeh	22	7	4	11	32	33	−1	25	Relegation to Provincial Leagues
9	Asto Abyek Qazvin	22	6	4	12	27	40	−13	22	Relegation to Provincial Leagues
10	Pasargad Novin Tehran	22	5	5	12	20	33	−13	20	Relegation to Provincial Leagues
11	Sh. Novin Tabriz	22	3	8	11	24	40	−16	17	Relegation to Provincial Leagues
12	Setareh Sorkh Zanjan	22	0	5	17	9	51	−42	5	Relegation to Provincial Leagues

Updated to match(es) played on 16 March 2011. Source:
Rules for classification: 1) points; 2) goal difference; 3) number of goals scored.

=== Group 2 ===
Pos	Team	Pld	W	D	L	GF	GA	GD	Pts	Qualification or relegation
1	Naft Mahmoudabad	22	12	6	4	41	16	+25	42	Promoted Second Round
2	Sh. Behshahr	22	10	9	3	42	24	+18	39	Promoted Second Round
3	Sh. Eslamshahr	22	11	5	6	43	25	+18	38	
4	H.F Kashmar	22	11	5	6	35	21	+14	38	
5	Per. Qaem Shahr	22	11	5	6	30	23	+7	38	Relegation to Provincial Leagues
6	Dehdari Mashhad	22	9	9	4	34	18	+16	36	Relegation to Provincial Leagues
7	Naftoon Tehran	22	9	7	6	30	22	+8	34	Relegation to Provincial Leagues
8	Ashayer Noor	22	7	6	9	28	33	−5	27	Relegation to Provincial Leagues
9	Rah Ahan Novin	22	7	5	10	23	27	−4	26	Relegation to Provincial Leagues
10	Keshavarz Golestan	22	6	1	15	19	43	−24	19	Relegation to Provincial Leagues
11	Faraghi Bandar Torkaman	22	4	4	14	25	60	−35	16	Relegation to Provincial Leagues
12	H.F Kh. Shomali	22	2	4	16	11	49	−38	10	Relegation to Provincial Leagues

Updated to match(es) played on 16 March 2011. Source:
Rules for classification: 1) points; 2) goal difference; 3) number of goals scored.

=== Group 3 ===
Pos	Team	Pld	W	D	L	GF	GA	GD	Pts	Qualification or relegation
1	Mehr Karaj	22	16	0	6	63	20	+43	48	Promoted Second Round
2	Gitipasand Isfahan	22	15	2	5	44	23	+21	47	Promoted Second Round
3	Payam Babol	22	14	4	4	43	17	+26	46	
4	Sepahan Novin	22	13	6	3	41	10	+31	45	
5	Talash Nazarabad	22	13	3	6	40	26	+14	42	Relegation to Provincial Leagues
6	Hepco Arak	22	11	1	10	35	39	−4	34	Relegation to Provincial Leagues
7	Hoodkan Babakhani Tehran	22	7	8	7	29	24	+5	29	Relegation to Provincial Leagues
8	Eram Saze Qom	22	6	3	13	27	33	−6	21	Relegation to Provincial Leagues
9	Abfa Tehran	22	6	3	13	26	40	−14	21	Relegation to Provincial Leagues
10	Sh. Javid Karaj	22	5	6	11	17	38	−21	21	Relegation to Provincial Leagues
11	Maharat Mehdishahr	22	5	4	13	19	47	−28	19	Relegation to Provincial Leagues
12	Aria Sepahan Qom	22	0	2	20	9	76	−67	2	Relegation to Provincial Leagues

Updated to match(es) played on 16 March 2011. Source:
Rules for classification: 1) points; 2) goal difference; 3) number of goals scored.

=== Group 4 ===
Pos	Team	Pld	W	D	L	GF	GA	GD	Pts	Qualification or relegation
1	Datis Lorestan	20	13	5	2	42	13	+29	44	Promoted Second Round
2	Palayesh Gaz Ilam	20	10	6	4	32	11	+21	36	Promoted Second Round
3	Mokerian Mahabad	20	10	6	4	36	17	+19	36	
4	Dartak Khoramabad	20	10	4	6	29	22	+7	34	
5	Vahdat Ivan-e-gharb	20	9	6	5	37	25	+12	33	Relegation to Provincial Leagues
6	Ara-e Gharb Kermanshah	20	7	6	7	32	29	+3	27	Relegation to Provincial Leagues
7	Kheibar Pol-e-Dokhtar	20	8	3	9	22	34	−12	27	Relegation to Provincial Leagues
8	Sh. Shazand	20	6	5	9	28	39	−11	23	Relegation to Provincial Leagues
9	Ehsan Sepid Nahavand	20	5	4	11	31	41	−10	19	Relegation to Provincial Leagues
10	Ouraz Marivan	20	5	3	12	19	38	−19	18	Relegation to Provincial Leagues
11	Est. Hamedan	20	2	2	16	8	47	−39	8	Relegation to Provincial Leagues

Updated to match(es) played on 16 March 2011. Source:
Rules for classification: 1) points; 2) goal difference; 3) number of goals scored.

=== Group 5 ===
Pos	Team	Pld	W	D	L	GF	GA	GD	Pts	Qualification or relegation
1	Sh. Zarand	22	16	4	2	44	11	+33	52	Promoted Second Round
2	Almahdi Novin Hormozgan	22	15	5	2	46	18	+28	50	Promoted Second Round
3	Mes Shahr-e Babak	22	15	4	3	44	13	+31	49	
4	Mes Novin Kerman	22	12	7	3	38	17	+21	43	
5	Nazsaram Meybod	22	11	5	6	29	18	+11	38	Relegation to Provincial Leagues
6	Paas Birjand	22	8	7	7	28	24	+4	31	Relegation to Provincial Leagues
7	Sanaye Ardakan	22	7	5	10	33	34	−1	26	Relegation to Provincial Leagues
8	Per. Zahedan	22	6	3	13	29	36	−7	21	Relegation to Provincial Leagues
9	Sh. Ghayen	22	5	4	13	21	44	−23	19	Relegation to Provincial Leagues
10	Omid Seramic Meybod	22	4	4	14	19	43	−24	16	Relegation to Provincial Leagues
11	Khatam Ardakan	22	4	3	15	14	44	−30	15	Relegation to Provincial Leagues
12	Niroogah Iranshahr	22	2	3	17	17	60	−43	9	Relegation to Provincial Leagues

Updated to match(es) played on 16 March 2011. Source:
Rules for classification: 1) points; 2) goal difference; 3) number of goals scored.

=== Group 6 ===
Pos	Team	Pld	W	D	L	GF	GA	GD	Pts	Qualification or relegation
1	Hafari Ahvaz	20	11	5	4	40	19	+21	38	Promoted Second Round
2	Khadamat va Omran Kish	20	11	5	4	32	22	+10	38	Promoted Second Round
3	Bahman Shiraz	20	11	4	5	36	18	+18	37	
4	Saipa Borazjan	20	10	7	3	38	22	+16	37	
5	Milad Dezful	20	11	4	5	26	21	+5	37	Relegation to Provincial Leagues
6	Kargar Boneh Gaz	20	11	1	8	45	21	+24	34	Relegation to Provincial Leagues
7	Sh. Dezful	20	9	7	4	39	21	+18	34	Relegation to Provincial Leagues
8	Per. Shiraz	20	5	6	9	22	25	−3	21	Relegation to Provincial Leagues
9	Est. Dehdasht	20	4	1	15	14	50	−36	13	Relegation to Provincial Leagues
10	Boroojen Foolad Charmahal	20	3	3	14	21	51	−30	12	Relegation to Provincial Leagues
11	Ashayer Kohgiluyeh	20	1	3	16	12	55	−43	6	Relegation to Provincial Leagues

Updated to match(es) played on 16 March 2011. Source:
Rules for classification: 1) points; 2) goal difference; 3) number of goals scored.

== Second Round (standings) ==
=== Group A ===
Pos	Team	Pld	W	D	L	GF	GA	GD	Pts	Promotion or qualification
1	Mehr Karaj	10	7	1	2	16	8	+8	22	Promoted to 2nd Division 2011–12
2	Naft Mahmoudabad	10	5	2	3	16	10	+6	17	Promoted to 2nd Division 2011–12
3	Gitipasand Isfahan	10	5	2	3	14	9	+5	17	Promotion play-off
4	Sh. Lahijan	10	4	2	4	10	9	+1	14	
5	Sh. Behshahr	10	3	3	4	16	16	0	12	
6	Entezam Tehran	10	0	2	8	8	28	−20	2	

Updated to match(es) played on 2 June 2011. Source:
Rules for classification: 1) points; 2) goal difference; 3) number of goals scored.

=== Group B ===
Pos	Team	Pld	W	D	L	GF	GA	GD	Pts	Promotion or qualification
1	Hafari Ahvaz	10	5	4	1	15	11	+4	19	Promoted to 2nd Division 2011–12
2	Datis Lorestan	10	4	5	1	13	10	+3	17	Promoted to 2nd Division 2011–12
3	Almahdi Novin Hormozgan	10	4	4	2	17	15	+2	16	Promotion play-off
4	Khadamat va Omran Kish	10	3	4	3	16	13	+3	13	
5	Sh. Zarand	10	3	3	4	16	14	+2	12	
6	Palayesh Gaz Ilam	10	0	2	8	8	22	−14	2	

Updated to match(es) played on 28 May 2011. Source:
Rules for classification: 1) points; 2) goal difference; 3) number of goals scored.

== Final ==
=== Championship final ===
The first leg to be played on 14 June 2011; the return leg to be played on 21 June 2011

Team 1	Agg.	Team 2	1st leg	2nd leg
Hafari Ahvaz	3–4	Mehr Karaj	2–1	1–3

=== Third place play-off ===
The single match to be played on 14 June 2011

Team 1	Score	Team 2	Notes
Datis Lorestan	2–1	Naft Mahmoudabad	

== Promotion play-off ==
The first legs to be played on 13 June 2011; the return legs to be played on 19 June 2011

Team 1	Agg.	Team 2	1st leg	2nd leg
Gitipasand Isfahan	2–1	Shahrdari Bandar Anzali	1–1	1–0

Gitipasand Isfahan Promoted to 2nd Division.

Team 1	Agg.	Team 2	1st leg	2nd leg
Almahdi Novin Hormozgan	4–2	Baam Shahrekord	2–1	2–1

Almahdi Novin Hormozgan Promoted to 2nd Division.

== Player statistics ==
=== Top scorers ===
Rank	Scorer	Club	Goals
1	(Iran) Rasoul Nazem-Roaya	Gitipasand Isfahan	23
2	(Iran) Afshin Mohammadi	Kargar Boneh-Gez Tangestan	18
3	(Iran) Vahid Barati	Mehr Karaj	17
4	(Iran) Moslem Salehi Fard	Sepahan Novin	15
5	(Iran) Ali Gholamipoor	Saipa Borazjan	14

== Sources ==
- اعلام جدول رده بندی مسابقات لیگ دسته سوم
- جدول رده بندی لیگ دسته کشور
- جدول رده بندی نهایی مسابقات لیگ دسته سوم در گروههای یک ، دو و شش
- جدول رده بنده نهایی مرحله اول لیگ دسته 3
