= 2011–12 Hazfi Cup =

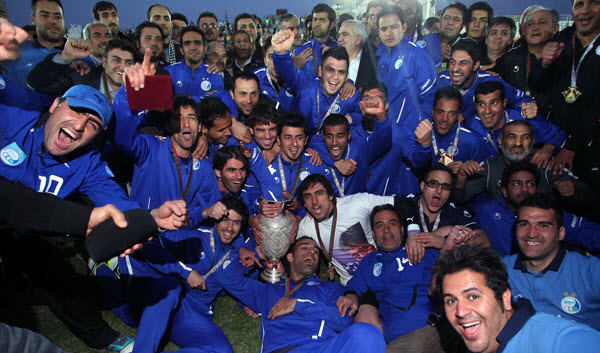
- Esteghlal celebrating their cup

Tournament details
- Country: Iran
- Teams: 100

Final positions
- Champions: Esteghlal
- Runners-up: Shahin Bushehr

Tournament statistics
- Matches played: 99
- Goals scored: 235 (2.37 per match)
- Top goal scorer: (Portugal) Hugo Machado (4)

The 2011–12 Hazfi Cup was the 25th season of the Iranian football knockout competition. Persepolis were the defending champion but were eliminated by Esteghlal in the quarter-finals. This was the fourth consecutive win for Esteghlal against Persepolis in official matches. The competition began on September 12, 2011 and ended on March 15, 2012. Esteghlal beat Shahin Bushehr 4–1 on penalties and was qualified for the group stage of the 2013 AFC Champions League.

== Participating teams ==
in total 100 teams participated in the 2011–12 season. The teams were divided into three main groups:

- 18 teams of the Iran Pro League: entering at the round of 32.
- 28 teams of the Azadegan League: entering at the second round.
- 54 teams from Provincial Leagues and 2nd Division League: entering at the first round.

== First stage ==
The First Stage featured 82 teams, with a total of 14 teams qualifying for the Second Stage.

=== First round ===
Matches were played on 12 September 2011.

No.	Home team	Score	Away team
1	Mahan Kermanshah	1–0	Datis Lorestan
2	Hadaf Minab	(w/o)	Aria Khorramdarreh
3	Ashian Gostar Varamin	4–0	Shahid Mahan Kerman
4	Moghavemat Tehran	5–1	Bahman Ilam
5	Pershiaan Zanjan	(w/o)	Jahan Electric Nishapur
6	Ansar Siman Shahrood	1–5	Mehr Karaj
7	Esteghlal Ramhormoz	4–1	Oghab Shiraz
8	Kimia Aqqala	6–4	Omid Khalkhal
9	Mantagheh Vizheh	(w/o)	Badr Hormozgan
10	Kish-Air Kish	(w/o)	Shahrdari Naghadeh
11	Hafari Ahvaz	4–0	Nosazi Hamedan
12	Esteghlal Ahvaz	(w/o)	Siah Jamegan Khorasan
13	Choka Talesh	6–0	Shimi Zabol
14	Shahin Dehno Kuhrang	(w/o)	Shahrdari Gachsaran
15	Takmehr Takestan	(w/o)	Misagh Sepah Taft
16	Atrak Bojnourd	(w/o)	Salafchegan Qom
17	Sepidrood Rasht	(w/o)	Shahrdari Chaboksar
18	Shahid Vahid Pakdasht	2–1	Sepahan Khurouj
19	Yadavaran Khoramshahr	1–0	Poomer Saveh
20	Zob Ahan Novin Isfahan	3–1	Gahar Zagros Novin
21	Miaad Shahriar Tehran	1–4	Sanat Naft Novin
22	Yaran Omid Fooladshahr	0–1	Foolad Novin
23	Khazar Mahmoudabad	(w/o)	Shamoushak Noshahr
24	Persepolis Kamyaran	2–3	Gostaresh Foolad Sahand
25	Giti Pasand Isfahan	(w/o)	Payam Mashhad
26	Pas Novin Hamedan	(w/o)	Moaseseh Mosatafa-lou

=== Second round ===
Matches were played between 21 and 23 September 2011.

No.	Home team	Score	Away team
27	Mahan Kermanshah	1–0	Hadaf Minab
28	Jahan Electric Nishapur	2–3	Gostaresh Foolad Tabriz
29	Esteghlal Ramhormoz	(w/o)	Sanat Sari
30	Shirin Faraz	8–0	Kimia Aqqala
31	Shahrdari Naghadeh	1–2	Gahar Zagros
32	Pas Hamedan	(w/o)	Shahin Dehno Kuhrang
33	Shahrdari Yasuj	14–0	Shahrdari Ferdows
34	Etka Gorgan	1–0	Takmehr Takestan
35	Atrak Bojnourd	(w/o)	Foolad Yazd
36	Esteghlal Khuzestan	4–0	Shahrdari Chaboksar
37	Saipa Shomal	2–0	Shahid Vahid Pakdasht
38	Paykan Qazvin	1–0	Yadavaran Khoramshahr
39	Machine Sazi Tabriz	(w/o)	Aluminium Hormozgan
40	Tarbiat Yazd	6–0	Khazar Mahmoudabad
41	Nirooye Zamini	4–3	Shahin Karaj
42	Ashian Gostar Varamin	0–1	Mes Rafsanjan
43	Steel Azin Semnan	1–0	Moghavemat Tehran
44	Badr Hormozgan	0–0	Sanati Kaveh Tehran
Badr advance 4–2 on penalties.
45	Gol Gohar Sirjan	2–0	Choka Talesh
46	Payam Mokhaberat	2–1	Zob Ahan Novin Isfahan
47	Iranjavan Bushehr	2–1	Sanat Naft Novin
48	Foolad Novin	0–1	Shahrdari Arak
49	Gostaresh Foolad Sahand	0–1	Aboomoslem Khorasan
50	Parseh Tehran	1–1	Giti Pasand Isfahan
Giti Pasand advance 4–2 on penalties.
51	Hafari Ahvaz	(w/o)	Nassaji Mazandaran
52	Siah Jamegan Khorasan	(w/o)	Bargh Shiraz
53	Mehr Karaj	(w/o)	Shahrdari Bandar Abbas
54	Naft Masjed Soleyman	(w/o)	Pas Novin Hamedan

=== Third round ===
Matches were played on 7 October 2011.

No.	Home team	Score	Away team
55	Mes Rafsanjan	6–1	Mahan Kermanshah
56	Gostaresh Foolad Tabriz	3–0	Steel Azin Semnan
57	Mehr Karaj	4–2	Esteghlal Ramhormoz
58	Badr Hormozgan	0–2	Shirin Faraz Kermanshah
59	Gahar Zagros	1–0	Hafari Ahvaz
60	Siah Jamegan Khorasan	2–0	Gol Gohar Sirjan
61	Shahin Dehno Kuhrang	1–5	Shahrdari Yasuj
62	Etka Gorgan	1–0	Atrak Bojnourd
63	Esteghlal Khuzestan	3–0	Saipa Shomal
64	Paykan Qazvin	0–0	Payam Mokhaberat
Payam Mokhaberat advance 8–7 on penalties.
65	Shahrdari Arak	1–0	Iranjavan Bushehr
66	Machine Sazi Tabriz	(w/o)	Tarbiat Yazd
67	Giti Pasand Isfahan	0–3	Aboomoslem Khorasan
68	Nirooye Zamini	1–0	Naft Masjed Soleyman

== Second stage ==
The 18 teams from the Iran Pro League entered this stage.

=== Bracket ===
Round of 32
H	Persepolis	2
A	Mes Rafsanjan	1
H	Zob Ahan	2
A	Gostaresh Foolad Tabriz	1
A	Rah Ahan	1
H	Mehr Karaj	3
H	Esteghlal	5
A	Shirin Faraz Kermanshah	1
H	Foolad	2
A	Sepahan	0
H	Sanat Naft Abadan	3
A	Gahar Zagros	1
H	Saipa	0
A	Siah Jamegan Khorasan	1
A	Tractor Sazi	0(3)
H	Shahrdari Yasuj	0(4)
H	Moghavemat Sepasi	1
A	Etka Gorgan	0
H	Sanat Mes Kerman	(w/o)
A	Esteghlal Khuzestan	-
H	Saba	2
A	Payam Mokhaberat	1
A	Mes Sarcheshme	1
H	Shahrdari Arak	0
H	Damash Gilan	1(5)
A	Naft Tehran	1(4)
H	Shahrdari Tabriz	1
A	Machine Sazi Tabriz	2
A	Malavan	2
H	Aboomoslem Khorasan	3
H	Shahin Bushehr	3
A	Nirooye Zamini	1

Round of 16
A	Persepolis	3
H	Zob Ahan	2
A	Mehr Karaj	0
H	Esteghlal	1
A	Foolad	1
H	Sanat Naft	0
H	Siah Jamegan Khorasan	1
A	Shahrdari Yasuj	2
A	Moghavemat Sepasi	0
H	Sanat Mes Kerman	3
A	Saba Qom	0(5)
H	Mes Sarcheshme	0(4)
A	Damash Gilan	2
H	Machine Sazi Tabriz	1
H	Aboomoslem Khorasan	0
A	Shahin Bushehr	1

Quarter-Final
H	Persepolis	0
A	Esteghlal	3
A	Foolad	1(2)
H	Shahrdari Yasuj	1(4)
A	Sanat Mes Kerman	1(5)
H	Saba Qom	1(4)
H	Damash Gilan	1
A	Shahin Bushehr	2

Semi-Final
H	Esteghlal	1
A	Shahrdari Yasuj	0
A	Mes Kerman	0
H	Shahin Bushehr	2

Final
-	Esteghlal	0(4)
-	Shahin Bushehr	0(1)

Note: H: Home team, A: Away team

=== Round of 32 ===
Matches were played between 25 and 26 October 2011.

No.	Home team	Score	Away team
1	Persepolis	2–1	Mes Rafsanjan
2	Saipa	0–1	Siah Jamegan Khorasan
3	Shahrdari Yasuj	0–0	Tractor Sazi
Shahrdari Yasuj advance 4–3 on penalties.
4	Moghavemat Sepasi	1–0	Etka Gorgan
5	Sanat Mes Kerman	(w/o)	Esteghlal Khuzestan
6	Foolad	1–0	Sepahan
7	Damash Gilan	1–1	Naft Tehran
Damash advance 5–4 on penalties.
8	Aboomoslem Khorasan	3–2	Malavan
9	Shahin Bushehr	3–1	Nirooye Zamini
10	Zob Ahan	2–1	Gostaresh Foolad Tabriz
11	Mehr Karaj	3–1	Rah Ahan
12	Esteghlal	5–1	Shirin Faraz Kermanshah
13	Sanat Naft Abadan	3–1	Gahar Zagros
14	Saba	2–1	Payam Mokhaberat
15	Shahrdari Arak	0–1	Mes Sarcheshme
16	Shahrdari Tabriz	1–2	Machine Sazi Tabriz

=== Round of 16 ===
Matches were played between 27 and 28 November 2011.

No.	Home team	Score	Away team
17	Zob Ahan	2–3	Persepolis
18	Mes Sarcheshme	0–0	Saba
Saba advance 5–4 on penalties.
19	Machine Sazi Tabriz	1–2	Damash Gilan
20	Siah Jamegan Khorasan	1–2	Shahrdari Yasuj
21	Sanat Naft Abadan	0–2	Foolad
22	Sanat Mes Kerman	3–0	Moghavemat Sepasi
23	Aboomoslem Khorasan	0–1	Shahin Bushehr
24	Esteghlal	1–0	Mehr Karaj

=== Quarter-Finals ===
Matches were played between 9 and 19 December 2011.

No.	Home team	Score	Away team
25	Persepolis	0–3	Esteghlal
26	Shahrdari Yasuj	1–1	Foolad
Shahrdari Yasuj advance 4–2 on penalties.
27	Damash Gilan	1–2	Shahin Bushehr
28	Saba Qom	1–1	Sanat Mes Kerman
Mes Kerman advance 5–4 on penalties.

=== Semi-finals ===
Matches were played on 30 December 2011.

No.	Home team	Score	Away team
29	Esteghlal	1–0	Shahrdari Yasuj
30	Shahin Bushehr	2–0	Mes Kerman

=== Final ===
The final was played as a single-elimination match.

March 15, 2012	Esteghlal	0–0 (a.e.t.) (4–1 p)	Shahin Bushehr	Hafezieh Stadium, Shiraz
15:00 (UTC+3:30)		Report (in Persian)		Attendance: 16,369; Referee: Alireza Faghani
	Penalties
	Yousefi (penalty scored); Zandi (penalty scored); Samuel (penalty scored); Jerković (penalty scored)		Noori (penalty missed); Shokouh Magham (penalty missed); Ansarian (penalty scored)

== See also ==
- 2011–12 Persian Gulf Cup
- 2011–12 Azadegan League
- 2011–12 Iran Football's 2nd Division
- 2011–12 Iran Football's 3rd Division
- Iranian Super Cup
- 2011–12 Iranian Futsal Super League
