= Mohammad Nozhati =

Iranian footballer

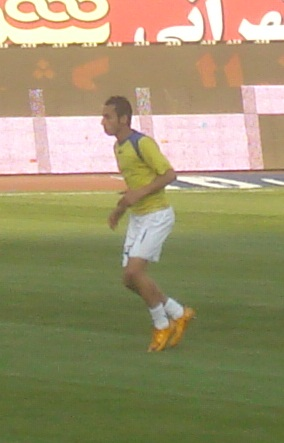
- Nozhati in 2013

Personal information
- Full name: Mohammad Nozhati
- Date of birth: 8 June 1985 (age 41)
- Place of birth: Rasht, Iran
- Height: 1.72 m (5 ft 8 in)
- Position: Striker

Team information
- Current team: Sepidrood
- Number: 10

Youth career
- 2000–2004: Malavan

Senior career*
Years	Team	Apps	(Gls)
2004–2005	Malavan	0	(0)
2005–2007	Fajr Gilan		
2007–2013	Malavan	155	(23)
2013–2014	Naft Tehran	12	(0)
2014	Fajr Sepasi	12	(0)
2014–2015	Saipa	24	(3)
2015	Malavan	10	(0)
2015–2016	Shahrdari Ardabil	1	(1)
2016–	Sepidrood Rasht	52	(9)
- * Club domestic league appearances and goals as of 15 May 2015

Mohammad Pouya Nozhati (born 8 June 1985) is an Iranian footballer who plays for Sepidrood in the Persian Gulf Pro League.

== Early years ==
He is originally from Lashtenesha.

== Club career ==
Nozhati has played for Malavan.

=== Club career statistics ===
Last update 15 May 2015

Club performance			League		Cup		Continental		Total	
Season	Club	League	Apps	Goals	Apps	Goals	Apps	Goals	Apps	Goals
Iran			League		Hazfi Cup		Asia		Total	
2007–08	Malavan	Pro League	5	0			–	–		
2008–09	Malavan	Pro League	30	5			–	–		
2009–10	Malavan	Pro League	28	1			–	–		
2010–11	Malavan	Pro League	28	8	5	2	–	–	33	10
2011–12	Malavan	Pro League	32	6	1	0	–	–	33	6
2012–13	Malavan	Pro League	32	3	1	0	–	–	33	3
2013–14	Naft Tehran	Pro League	12	0	0	0	–	–	12	0
2013–14	Fajr Sepasi	Pro League	12	0	0	0	–	–	12	0
2014–15	Saipa	Pro League	24	3	1	0	–	–	25	3
Career total			203	26				0		

- Assist goals

Season	Team	Assists
10–11	Malavan	0
11–12	Malavan	0
12–13	Malavan	1
