= 2011–12 Iran 2nd Division =

Iran Football's 2nd Division
- Season: 2011–12
- Champions: Esteghlal Ahvaz
- Promoted: Esteghlal Ahvaz; Hafari Ahvaz; Pas Novin Hamedan; Foolad Sahand
- Relegated: Shamoushak Noshahr; Zob Ahan Novin; Payam Mashhad; Pershiaan Zanjan; Persepolis Borazjan
- Matches: 369
- Goals: 885 (2.4 per match)

2011–12 Iran 2nd Division season is the edition of third tier of the Iranian football league system's 2nd Division annual football competitive season for the Persian Gulf Cup.

The league is composed of 28 teams that are divided into two geographic divisions of 14 teams each. Teams contested only other teams in their own division: once at home and once away for a total of 26 matches each.

In each group, the top two teams are promoted to Azadegan League, and bottom two teams are relegated to 3rd Division plus the relegation playoff loser. In total, the league promotes 4 teams to Azadegan League and relegates 5 teams to 3rd Division.

The football league competition started on 8 September 2011.

== Teams ==
=== Group A ===
Team	City	Note
Badr Hormozgan	Bandar Abbas	Replaced for Ariyana Gostar Kish
Esteghlal Ahvaz	Ahvaz	
Fajr Jam Bushehr	Bushehr	
Foolad Novin	Ahvaz	
Giti Pasand Isfahan	Isfahan	
Hafari Ahvaz	Ahvaz	
Moghavemat Tehran	Tehran	
Naft va Gaz Gachsaran	Gachsaran	
Naft Mahmoudabad	Mahmoudabad	
Sepidrood Rasht	Rasht	
Shahrdari Ardebil	Ardebil	
Shamoushak Noshahr	Noshahr	
Siah Jamegan Khorasan	Mashhad	Replaced for Golchin Robat Karim
Zob Ahan Novin	Fooladshahr	

=== Group B ===
Team	City	Note
Ashian Gostar Varamin	Varamin	
Choka Talesh	Talesh	
Datis Lorestan	Khorramabad	
Gostaresh Foolad Sahand	Sahand	
Mantagheh Vizheh Bandar Abbas	Bandar Abbas	Replaced for Aluminium Almahdi Hormozgan
Mehr Karaj	Karaj	
Naft Omidiyeh	Omidiyeh	
Pas Novin Hamedan	Hamedan	
Payam Mashhad	Mashhad	
Persepolis Borazjan	Borazjan	
Pershiaan Zanjan	Zanjan	Replaced for Shahrdari Zanjan
Sanat Naft Novin	Abadan	
Shahrdari Dezful	Dezful	Replaced for Foolad Natanz
Shahrdari Noshahr	Noshahr	Replaced for Nozhan Sari

== Standings ==
=== Group A ===
Pos	Team	Pld	W	D	L	GF	GA	GD	Pts	Promotion or relegation
1	Est. Ahvaz	26	13	9	4	36	16	+20	48	Promotion to 2012–13 Azadegan League
2	Hafari Ahvaz	26	14	3	9	42	24	+18	45	Promotion to 2012–13 Azadegan League
3	Moghavemat Tehran	26	11	9	6	31	23	+8	42	
4	Siah Jamegan	26	11	6	9	35	29	+6	39	
5	Naft va Gaz Gachsaran	26	11	5	10	27	33	−6	38	
6	Sh. Ardabil	26	10	7	9	33	23	+10	37	
7	Foolad Novin	26	9	10	7	29	22	+7	37	
8	Giti Pasand	26	10	7	9	34	31	+3	37	
9	Fajr Bushehr	26	9	8	9	34	29	+5	35	
10	Sepidrood	26	9	8	9	26	26	0	35	
11	Albadr Bandar Kong	26	9	7	10	25	29	−4	34	
12	Naft Mahmoudabad	26	8	6	12	29	39	−10	30	Relegation Play Off
13	Zob Ahan Novin (R)	26	6	9	11	20	31	−11	27	Relegation to 3rd Division 2012-2013
14	Shamoushak (R)	26	2	6	18	6	52	−46	12	Relegation to 3rd Division 2012-2013

Updated to match(es) played on 7 May 2012. Source: Foolad FC
Rules for classification: 1) points; 2) goal difference; 3) number of goals scored.
(R) Relegated

=== Group B ===
Pos	Team	Pld	W	D	L	GF	GA	GD	Pts	Promotion or relegation
1	Pas Novin	26	15	8	3	42	14	+28	53	Promotion to 2012–13 Azadegan League
2	Foolad Sahand	26	15	6	5	52	21	+31	51	Promotion to 2012–13 Azadegan League
3	Naft Omidiyeh	26	13	11	2	37	20	+17	50	
4	Sanat Naft Novin	26	15	5	6	47	23	+24	48 (Note: Sanat Naft Novin was docked 2 points due to misbehavior.)	
5	Mehr Karaj	26	12	8	6	43	31	+12	44	
6	Sh. Dezful	26	12	6	8	39	26	+13	42	
7	Datis	26	9	10	7	29	30	−1	37	
8	Sh. Noshahr	26	10	6	10	32	28	+4	36	
9	Ashian Gostar	26	10	5	11	29	34	−5	35	
10	Mantagheh Vizheh	26	5	10	11	20	27	−7	25	
11	Chooka	26	6	8	12	28	39	−11	23 (Note: Chooka was docked 3 points due to misbehavior.)	
12	Per. Borazjan	26	4	9	13	33	45	−12	21	Relegation Play Off
13	Payam Mashhad (R)	26	4	9	13	26	38	−12	21	Relegation to 3rd Division 2012-2013
14	Pershiaan Zanjan (R)	26	0	3	23	6	87	−81	1 (Note: Pershiaan Zanjan was docked 2 points due to misbehavior.)	Relegation to 3rd Division 2012-2013

Updated to match(es) played on 7 May 2012. Source: Foolad FC
Rules for classification: 1) points; 2) goal difference; 3) number of goals scored.
(R) Relegated

== Final ==
=== Championship final ===
Team 1	Agg.	Team 2	1st leg	2nd leg
Esteghlal Ahvaz	4–3	Pas Novin Hamedan	4–2	0–1

=== Third place play-off ===
Team 1	Score	Team 2	Notes
Foolad Sahand	(w/o)	Hafari Ahvaz	

== Relegation play-off ==
Team 1	Agg.	Team 2	1st leg	2nd leg
Persepolis Borazjan	4–4	Naft Mahmoudabad	3–2	1-2

The loser will be relegated to 2012–13 Iran Football's 3rd Division
