= Misagh Memarzadeh =

Iranian footballer (born 1983)

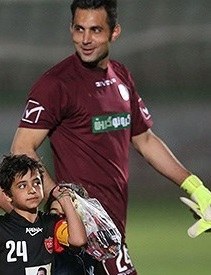

Personal information
- Full name: Misagh Memarzadeh
- Date of birth: 9 January 1983 (age 43)
- Place of birth: Tehran, Iran
- Height: 1.94 m (6 ft 4 in)
- Position: Goalkeeper

Youth career
- Paykan

Senior career*
| Years | Team | Apps | (Gls) |
| 2003–2005 | Saipa | 6 | (0) |
| 2005–2006 | Rah Ahan | 0 | (0) |
| 2006–2008 | Saipa | 24 | (0) |
| 2008–2010 | Persepolis | 22 | (0) |
| 2010–2011 | Foolad | 26 | (0) |
| 2011–2012 | Persepolis | 15 | (0) |
| 2015–2016 | Parseh | 19 | (0) |
- * Club domestic league appearances and goals as of 30 May 2012 ‡ National team caps and goals as of 13 June 2011

Misagh Memarzadeh (Persian: میثاق معمارزاده, born 9 January 1983) is a former Iranian professional football player who last played for Saipa and Perspolis among other clubs in Persian Gulf Pro League.

== Club career ==
He started his career in Saipa but after two years left the club after he had differences with the Italian coach Giovanni Mei and moved to Rah Ahan. He moved back to Saipa after one season and stayed there for two seasons. He moved to Persepolis in June 2008 but after his second match in September 2008 he was injured and could not play for about six months where he returned and played two times for Persepolis in ACL. He was a reserve goalkeeper for Sepahan in the 2008 AFC Champions League group stages. On 7 July 2011, Misagh Memarzadeh signed a deal with Iran Pro League side Persepolis. After a disappointing season in Persepolis, It was announced that he will leave the club at the end of the season.

== Club career statistics ==
As of 11 May 2012

| Club performance | | | League | | Cup | | Continental | | Total | |
| Season | Club | League | Apps | Goals | Apps | Goals | Apps | Goals | Apps | Goals |
| Iran | | | League | | Hazfi Cup | | Asia | | Total | |
|---|---|---|---|---|---|---|---|---|---|---|
| 2003–04 | Saipa | Pro League | 4 | 0 | | 0 | – | | | 0 |
| 2004–05 | Saipa | Pro League | 2 | 0 | | 0 | – | | | 0 |
| 2005–06 | Rah Ahan | Pro League | 0 | 0 | | 0 | – | | | 0 |
| 2006–07 | Saipa | Pro League | 4 | 0 | | 0 | – | | | 0 |
| 2007–08 | Saipa | Pro League | 20 | 0 | 1 | 0 | 2 | 0 | 23 | 0 |
| 2008–09 | Persepolis | Pro League | 2 | 0 | 0 | 0 | 2 | 0 | 4 | 0 |
| 2009–10 | Persepolis | Pro League | 20 | 0 | 2 | 0 | – | | 22 | 0 |
| 2010–11 | Foolad | Pro League | 26 | 0 | 3 | 0 | – | | 29 | 0 |
| 2011–12 | Persepolis | Pro League | 15 | 0 | 0 | 0 | 0 | 0 | 15 | 0 |
| Career total | | | 103 | 0 | | 0 | 4 | 0 | | 0 |

== International career ==
He was part of the Iran U23 in the Olympic Qualifications in 2003 but did play any matches. He was invited to Team Melli in June 2009 for 2010 FIFA World Cup qualification.

== Honours ==
=== Club ===
Saipa

- Iran Pro League: 2006–07

Persepolis

- Hazfi Cup: 2009–10
