= Albadr Bandar Kong F.C. =

Iranian football club

Albadr البدر
- Full name: Albadr Football Club
- Founded: 2007; 10 years ago
- Ground: Al Badr Kong Stadium, Kong, Bandar Lengeh County, Iran
- League: 3rd Division
- 2014–15: 2nd Division Group A, 10th (relegated)
- Website: http://www.albadr.ir

Albadr Kongport Football Club (Persian: باشگاه فوتبال البدر بندر کنگ), also called Albadr Hormozgan Football Club (Persian: باشگاه فوتبال البدر هرمزگان), is an Iranian football club that was established in 2007 in Bandar Kong, Hormozgan that has been in second division league since 2011 after the purchase of the franchise of Aria Gostar Kish football club. In 2013, it was promoted to the Azadegan League, but in 2014 it was relegated to League 2.

== Season-by-season ==
The table below shows the achievements of the club in various competitions.

Season	League	Position	Hazfi Cup	Notes
2011–12	2nd Division	11th	Third Round	
2012–13	2nd Division	2nd	Did Not Enter	Promoted
2013–14	Azadegan League	11th	Did Not Enter	Relegated
2014–15	2nd Division	10th	Third Round	Relegated

== See also ==
- 2011-12 Hazfi Cup
- 2011–12 Iran Football's 2nd Division
