= Mamadou Tall =

Burkinabe footballer (born 1982)

Personal information
- Date of birth: 4 December 1982 (age 43)
- Place of birth: Attecoube, Republic of Upper Volta
- Height: 1.85 m (6 ft 1 in)
- Position: Centre-back

Youth career
- Etoile Filante

Senior career*
Years	Team	Apps	(Gls)
1999–2001	Etoile Filante		
2001–2002	Bursaspor	2	(0)
2002–2003	CS Sfaxien		
2003	CS Grevenmacher		
2004	Etoile Filante		
2004–2007	USM Blida	54	(2)
2007–2008	Wydad Casablanca	5	(0)
2008–2011	União Leiria	35	(1)
2011–2012	Persepolis	9	(0)
2013	Santos Ouagadougou		

International career
2000–2012	Burkina Faso	46	(0)
- * Club domestic league appearances and goals

Mamadou Tall (born 4 December 1982) is a Burkinabé former professional footballer who played as a centre-back.

== Club career ==
Tall moved to Persepolis in summer 2011 from União Leiria.

== International career ==
Tall was part of the Burkina Faso national team at the 2002 African Nations Cup, which finished bottom of group B in the first round of competition, thus failing to secure qualification for the quarter-finals.

== Career statistics ==
As of 1 May 2012

Appearances and goals by club, season and competition
Club	Season	League			Cup (Note: Includes Algerian Cup, Moroccan Cup, Taça de Portugal, Hazfi Cup)		Continental		Total	
Club	Season	Division	Apps	Goals	Apps	Goals	Apps	Goals	Apps	Goals
USM Blida	2004–05	Algerian Ligue; Professionnelle 1	14	0	3	0	–		17	0
USM Blida	2005–06	Algerian Ligue; Professionnelle 1	22	2	1	0	–		23	2
USM Blida	2006–07	Algerian Ligue; Professionnelle 1	18	0	3	0	–		21	0
USM Blida	Total		54	2	7	0	0	0	61	0
Wydad	2007–08	Botola	5	0			–			
Leiria	2008–09	Liga de Honra	18	1			–			
Leiria	2009–10	Primeira Liga	11	0	1	0	–		12	0
Leiria	2010–11	Primeira Liga	6	0	0	0	–		6	0
Leiria	Total		35	1			0	0		
Persepolis	2011–12	Pro League	9	0	2	0	1	0	12	0
Career total			103	3			0	0		
