= Mehr Karaj F.C. =

Iranian football club

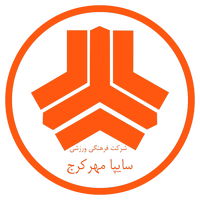
- Full name: Saipa Mehr Karaj Football Club
- Ground: Enghelab Stadium, Karaj, Iran
- Owner: SAIPA
- Head Coach: Behnam Taherzadeh
- League: 2nd Division
Home colours	Away colours

Saipa Mehr Karaj Football Club is an Iranian football club based in Karaj, Iran. They currently compete in the 2012–13 Iran Football's 2nd Division. They are an extension of Saipa FC, and are one of the clubs feeder teams.

== Season-by-Season ==
The table below shows the achievements of the club in various competitions.

Season	League	Position	Hazfi Cup	Notes
2009–10	Alborz Provincial League	1st
2010–11	3rd Division	1st/Group A	2nd Round	Promoted
2011–12	2nd Division	5th/Group B	1/8 Final
2012–13	2nd Division		Didn't enter

== See also ==
- 2011-12 Hazfi Cup
- 2011–12 Iran Football's 2nd Division

https://www.soccerway.com/team/mehr-karaj-fc/O44URD3K/
