= Alireza Ramezani (footballer, born 1984) =

Iranian footballer

Personal information
- Date of birth: 1 September 1984 (age 42)
- Place of birth: Bandar Anzali, Iran
- Height: 1.78 m (5 ft 10 in)
- Positions: Left winger; left back

Youth career
- –2006: Malavan

Senior career*
Years	Team	Apps	(Gls)
2006–2015	Malavan	180	(13)
2015	Shahrdari Bandar Abbas	2	(0)
2015–2016	Sanat Sari		
2016	Malavan	2	(0)
2016–2017	Shahrdari Fuman		
2017–2018	Shahin Bandar Anzali		
- * Club domestic league appearances and goals

Alireza Ramezani (Persian: علیرضا رمضانی; born 1 September 1984) is an Iranian former footballer.

== Club career statistics ==
Club performance			League		Cup		Continental		Total	
Season	Club	League	Apps	Goals	Apps	Goals	Apps	Goals	Apps	Goals
Iran			League		Hazfi Cup		Asia		Total	
2006–07	Malavan	Pro League	17	2			-	-		
2007–08	Malavan	Pro League	28	5			-	-		
2008–09	Malavan	Pro League	23	1			-	-		
2009–10	Malavan	Pro League	27	0			-	-		
2010–11	Malavan	Pro League	26	1			-	-		
2011–12	Malavan	Pro League	28	4	0	0	-	-	4	0
2012–13	Malavan	Pro League	18	0			-	-		
2013–14	Malavan	Pro League	4	0			-	-		
2014–15	Malavan	Pro League	9	0	1	0	-	-	10	0
2014–15	Sh. Bandar Abbas	Division 1	7	0	0	0	-	-	7	0
2015–16	Malavan	Pro League	0	0	0	0	-	-	0	0
Career total			187	13			0	0		
