= 2013–14 Hazfi Cup =

Jame Azadsazi Khorramshahr
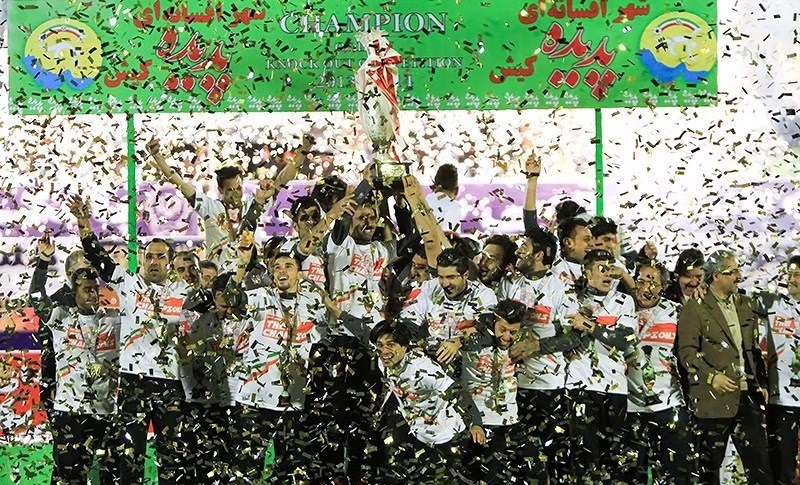

Tournament details
- Country: Iran
- Dates: 4 September 2013 – 14 February 2014
- Teams: 103

Final positions
- Champions: Tractor (1st title)
- Runners-up: Mes Kerman

Tournament statistics
- Matches played: 51
- Goals scored: 144 (2.82 per match)
- Top goal scorer: Edinho (4 goals)

Awards
- Best player: Karim Ansarifard

The 2013–14 Hazfi Cup was the 27th season of the Iranian football knockout competition. Sepahan was the defending champion, but was eliminated by Sanat Naft in the Round of 32. The competition started on 4 September 2013 and ended on 14 February 2014. Tractor won the title, defeating Mes Kerman in the final.

== Participating teams ==
Totally 103 teams participated in the 2013–14 season. The teams were divided into four main groups:

- 16 teams of the Iran Pro League: entering at the fourth round.
- 54 teams of the 2nd Division League and the Azadegan League: entering at the third round.
- 7 teams from Provincial Leagues: entering at the second round.
- 26 teams from Provincial Leagues: entering from first round.

== First stage ==
In the First Stage of “2013–14 Hazfi Cup”, 82 teams participated.

=== First round ===
4 September 2013 1	Shahrdari Zarach Yazd	2–2 (a.e.t.) (4–1 p)	Shahrdari Jajarm	Zarach
16:15 DST+04:30	Goal		Goal	Stadium: 17 Shahrivar Stadium
Note: Shahrdari Jajarm withdrew

4 September 2013 2	Shohadaye Sari	1–0	Esteghlal Novin Qazvin	Sari
16:15 DST+04:30	Mohammad Gholami			Stadium: Shahid Mottaghi Stadium

4 September 2013 3	Ettehad Novin Golestan Tehran	1–3	Ettehad Shadgoli Qom	Eslamshahr
16:30 DST+04:30	Goal		Ali Mir Hashemi; Sina Solati	Stadium: Elahie Baharestan Stadium

4 September 2013 4	Shohadaye Nirooye Havaei Tehran	w/o	Mahvand Mashhad	Tehran
16:30 DST+04:30				Stadium: Doushan Tappeh Stadium
Note: Mahvand Mashhad withdrew

4 September 2013 5	Payam Valiasr Markazi	w/o	Esteghlal Choram Kohgiluyeh	Arak
16:30 DST+04:30				Stadium: 5 Mordad Stadium
Note: Esteghlal Choram withdrew

4 September 2013 6	Parvaz Zanjan	w/o	Ilam's Champion	Zanjan
16:30 DST+04:30				Stadium: 15 Khordad Stadium
Note: Ilam's Champion withdrew

4 September 2013 7	Jonoub Susangerd Khuzestan	4–2	Shahrdari Kamyaran	Susangerd
16:30 DST+04:30	Mohammad Farsiat; Ali Negravi; Sadegh Saeidzadeh		Masoud Hosseini; Moslem Faridi	Stadium: Takhti Stadium

4 September 2013 8	Talar Vahdat Hamedan	w/o	Azar–Kowsar Tabriz	Hamedan
16:45 DST+04:30				Stadium: Qods Stadium
Note: Azar-Kowsar Tabriz withdrew

4 September 2013 9	Moavenat Varzesh va Amoozesh Kish	w/o	Alborz's Champion	Kish
16:45 DST+04:30				Stadium: Olympic Stadium
Note: Alborz's Champion withdrew

4 September 2013 10	Pas Ganaveh	3–1	Moghavemat Shahrekord	Bandar Ganaveh
16:45 DST+04:30	Khalifeh Ghaedi 42'; Masoud Salemi 44'; Hossein Zarei 90'		Mohammad Ghaffari 76'	Stadium: Shahid Seraji Stadium

4 September 2013 11	Gandomkaran Moghan	w/o	Shahrdari Novin Bandar Abbas	Kerman
Note: Shahrdari Novin Bandar Abbas withdrew

4 September 2013 12	Shahrdari Kelachay	w/o	Tis Chabahar	Kelachay
Note: Shahrdari Kelachay withdrew

4 September 2013 13	Khorāsān-e Janūbī's Champion	w/o	Lorestan's Champion	Mashhad
Note: Khorāsān-e Janūbī's Champion withdrew

=== Second round ===
10 September 2013 14	Shahrdari Zarach Yazd	1–2	Shohadaye Artesh Isfahan	Zarach
16:15 DST+04:30	Ahmad Hosseinipour		Hamid Goharian; Milad Norouzi	Stadium: 17 Shahrivar Stadium

10 September 2013 15	Jonoub Susangerd Khuzestan	3–1	Parvaz Zanjan	Susangerd
16:15 DST+04:30	Mohammad Farisat; Sadegh Saeidzadeh			Stadium: Takhti Stadium

10 September 2013 16	Ostandari Kermanshah	1–0	Gandomkaran Moghan	Kermanshah
16:15 DST+04:30	Navi Moradi			Stadium: Azadi Stadium

10 September 2013 17	Ettehad Shadgholi Qom	2–3	Piroozi Garmsar	Qom
16:15 DST+04:30	Goal		Mehdi Fadayi; Iman Shourbayi; Ali Amiri Asl	Stadium: Takhti Stadium

10 September 2013 18	Shohadaye Aqqala Golestan	0–1	Shohadaye Nirooye Havayi Tehran	Aqqala
16:15 DST+04:30			Goal	Stadium: Yadegar Emam Stadium

10 September 2013 19	Oghab Nirooye Havaei Shiraz	2–1	Shohadaye Sari	Shiraz
16:15 DST+04:30	Goal		Goal	Stadium: Dastgheyb Stadium

10 September 2013 20	Tis Chabahar	1–1 (a.e.t.) (3–4 p)	Talar Vahdat Hamedan	Zahedan
16:15 DST+04:30	Goal		Goal	Stadium: Olympic Stadium

10 September 2013 21	Gol Gohar Novin Sirjan	w/o	Lorestan's Champion	Sirjan
16:15 DST+04:30				Stadium: Gol Gohar Stadium
Note: Lorestan Football committee didn't introduced any team as champion of province

10 September 2013 22	Pas Ganaveh	3–0	Payam Vali Asr Markazi	Bandar Ganaveh
16:15 DST+04:30	Khalifeh Ghaedi; Javad Zarei; Mahmoud Rastegar			Stadium: Shahid Seraji Stadium

10 September 2013 23	Moavenat Varzesh va Amoozesh Kish	w/o	Keivan Morgh Mahabad	Kish
16:15 DST+04:30				Stadium: Olympic Stadium
Note: Keivan Morgh Mahabad withdrew

=== Third round ===
24	Aluminium Hormozgan	w/o	Shohadaye Artesh Isfahan
Note: Aluminium Hormozgan disqualified by FFIRI disciplinarian committee

15 September 2013 25	Caspian Qazvin	w/o	Esteghlal Sari	Qazvin
16:15 DST+04:30				Stadium: 5 Mordad Stadium
Note: Esteghlal Sari withdrew

15 September 2013 26	Mes Rafsanjan	1–0	Nirooye Zamini	Rafsanjan
16:00 DST+04:30	Goal			Stadium: Takhti Stadium

15 September 2013 27	Gaz Fajr Jam	w/o	Shahrdari Langarud
Note: Shahrdari Langarud withdrew

15 September 2013 28	Parseh Tehran	2–0	Jonoub Susangerd Khuzestan	Tehran
16:15 DST+04:30	Goal			Stadium: Sanaye Defa' Stadium

29	Shahrdari Jouybar	w/o	Gahar Doroud
Note: Gahar Doroud disqualified by FFIRI disciplinarian committee

30	Etka Gorgan	w/o	Shahrdari Arak
Note: Etka Gorgan disqualified by FFIRI disciplinarian committee

15 September 2013 31	Payam Sanat Amol	6–0	Ostandari Kermanshah	Amol
16:00 DST+04:30	Shahram Fallah; Ali Gholizadeh; Ali Arab; Danial Esmaeilfar			Stadium: Kargaran Stadium

15 September 2013 32	Piroozi Garmsar	1–5	Giti Pasand Isfahan	Garmsar
16:00 DST+04:30	Goal		Goal	Stadium: Takhti Stadium

33	Esteghlal Ahvaz	w/o	Naft Omidiyeh
Note: Esteghlal Ahvaz disqualified by FFIRI disciplinarian committee

34	Shahrdari Dezful	w/o	Naft Gachsaran
Note: Naft Gachsaran disqualified by FFIRI disciplinarian committee

35	Shahrdari Tabriz	w/o	Sanat Naft Novin
Note: Shahrdari Tabriz disqualified by FFIRI disciplinarian committee

36	Minab Toyur Hormozgan	w/o	Nassaji Mazandaran
Note: Nassaji Mazandaran disqualified by FFIRI disciplinarian committee

15 September 2013 37	Al-Badr Bandar Kong	0–1	Gol Gohar	Bandar Lengeh
16:15 DST+04:30			Mohsen Mozaffarizadeh	Stadium: Takhti Stadium

15 September 2013 38	Sanat Naft Abadan	w/o	Rahian Kermanshah
Note: Rahian Kermanshah withdrew

15 September 2013 39	Shohadaye Nirooye Havayi Tehran	1–3	Siah Jamegan Mashhad	Tehran
16:15 DST+04:30	Goal		Goal	Stadium: Doushan Tapeh Stadium

15 September 2013 40	Persepolis Ganaveh	4–3	Oghab Nirooye Havaei Shiraz	Bandar Ganaveh
16:30 DST+04:30	Mohammad Sadegh Ahmadi; Mohammad Reza Behrouzi; Sadegh Gharibvand		Goal	Stadium: Shahid Seraji Stadium

15 September 2013 41	Naft Masjed Soleyman	3–0	Paykan Qazvin	Masjed Soleyman
16:30 DST+04:30	Hakim Nassari; Homayoun Geravand; Reza Darvishi			Stadium: Naft Masjed Soleyman Stadium

42	Bargh Shiraz	w/o	Machine Sazi Tabriz
Note: Bargh Shiraz disqualified by FFIRI disciplinarian committee

43	Saipa Shomal	w/o	Sanat Sari
Note: Saipa Shomal disqualified by FFIRI disciplinarian committee

44	Nozhan Noshahr	w/o	Shahin Bushehr
Note: Shahin Bushehr disqualified by FFIRI disciplinarian committee

45	Shahrdari Yasuj	w/o	Yazd Louleh
Note: Shahrdari Yasuj disqualified by FFIRI disciplinarian committee

15 September 2013 46	Mes Soongoun Varzaghan	w/o	Sepidrood	Tabriz
16:15 DST+04:30				Stadium: Takhti Stadium
Note: Mes Soongoun withdrew

15 September 2013 47	Nabard Shahrekord	w/o	Talar Vahdat Hamedan	Shahrekord
16:15 DST+04:30				Stadium: Enghelab Stadium
Note: Nabard Shahrekord withdrew

15 September 2013 48	Gol Gohar Novin Sirjan	w/o	Foolad Yazd	Sirjan
16:00 DST+04:30				Stadium: Gol Gohar Stadium
Note: Gol Gohar Novin Sirjan withdrew

49	Shahrdari Bandar Abbas	w/o	Aboomoslem
Note: Aboomoslem disqualified by FFIRI disciplinarian committee

50	Steel Azin Tehran	w/o	Iranjavan Bushehr
Note: Iranjavan disqualified by FFIRI disciplinarian committee

15 September 2013 51	Foolad Novin Ahvaz	6–0	Pas Ganaveh	Ahvaz
16:30 DST+04:30	Moslem Salehi; Mostafa Yarfi; Saeid Kheradmand; Mostafa Mahi			Stadium: Foolad Stadium

15 September 2013 52	Pas Hamedan	w/o	Padideh Mashhad
Note: PAS Hamedan withdrew

15 September 2013 53	Shahrdari Ardabil	w/o	Kargar Boneh Gez Boushehr
Note: Kargar Boneh Gez withdrew

15 September 2013 54	Bahman Shiraz	w/o	Melli Hafari Ahvaz	Shiraz
16:00 DST+04:30				Stadium: Shahid Dastgheyb Stadium
Note: Bahman Shiraz withdrew

15 September 2013 55	Alvand Hamedan	1–0	Moavenat Varzesh va Amoozesh Kish	Hamedan
16:15 DST+04:30	Ali Asghar Ashouri			Stadium: Qods Stadium

=== Fourth round ===
20 September 2013 56	Padideh Mashhad	w/o	Shahrdari Ardabil	Mashhad
15:30 DST+04:30				Stadium: Samen Stadium
Note: Shahrdari Ardabil withdrew

21 September 2013 57	Shohadaye Artesh Isfahan	0–4	Caspian Qazvin	Isfahan
16:00 DST+04:30			Goal	Stadium: Takhti Stadium

21 September 2013 58	Mes Rafsanjan	2–1	Gaz Fajr Jam	Rafsanjan
15:45 DST+04:30	Goal		Goal	Stadium: Takhti Stadium

21 September 2013 59	Parseh Tehran	0–0 (a.e.t.) (5–4 p)	Shahrdari Jouybar	Tehran
16:00 DST+04:30				Stadium: Sanaye Defa' Stadium

60	Shahrdari Arak	w/o	Payam Sanat Amol
Note: Shahrdari Arak disqualified by FFIRI disciplinarian committee

21 September 2013 61	Naft Omidiyeh	2–0	Giti Pasand Isfahan	Omidiyeh
16:15 DST+04:30	Goal			Stadium: Takhti Stadium

21 September 2013 62	Sanat Naft Novin	1–2	Shahrdari Dezful	Abadan
16:15 DST+04:30	Goal		Goal	Stadium: Takhti Stadium

63	Sepidrood	w/o	Minab Toyur Hormozgan
Note: Sepidroud withdrew

21 September 2013 64	Siah Jamegan Mashhad	0–1	Sanat Naft Abadan	Mashhad
15:30 DST+04:30			Mansour Tanhaei	Stadium: Samen Stadium

21 September 2013 65	Persepolis Ganaveh	4–4 (a.e.t.) (2–3 p)	Naft Masjed Soleyman	Bandar Ganaveh
16:15 DST+04:30	Goal		Goal	Stadium: Shahid Seraji Stadium

66	Machine Sazi Tabriz	w/o	Sanat Sari
Note: Sanat Sari disqualified by FFIRI disciplinarian committee

21 September 2013 67	Yazd Louleh	w/o	Nozhan Noshahr	Yazd
15:45 DST+04:30				Stadium: Shahid Nasiri Stadium
Note: Nozhan withdrew

21 September 2013 68	Talar Vahdat Hamedan	w/o	Gol Gohar	Hamedan
16:15 DST+04:30				Stadium: Qods Stadium
Note: Gol Gohar withdrew

69	Foolad Yazd	w/o	Shahrdari Bandar Abbas
Note: Shahrdari Bandar Abbas disqualified by FFIRI disciplinarian committee

70	Foolad Novin Ahvaz	w/o	Steel Azin Tehran
Note: Steel Azin disqualified by FFIRI disciplinarian committee

21 September 2013 71	Melli Hafari Ahvaz	0–1	Alvand Hamedan	Ahvaz
16:15 DST+04:30			Goal	Stadium: Naft Stadium

== Second stage ==
=== Bracket ===
Round of 32
H	Esteghlal	1
A	Caspian Qazvin	0
H	Malavan	1
A	Mes Rafsanjan	0
H	Payam Sanat Amol	1
A	Zob Ahan	2
H	Naft Tehran	3
A	Parseh Tehran	1
H	Saba Qom	0
A	Naft Omidiyeh	1
H	Shahrdari Dezful	1
A	Mes Kerman	3
H	Gostaresh Foolad	w/o
A	Minab Toyur Hormozgan
H	Sanat Naft	1
A	Sepahan	0
H	Persepolis	5
A	Padideh Mashhad	1
H	Alvand Hamedan	1(6)
A	Esteghlal Khuzestan	1(5)
H	Foolad Novin Ahvaz	w/o
A	Fajr Sepasi
H	Foolad	w/o
A	Foolad Yazd
H	Rah Ahan Sorinet	7
A	Talar Vahdat Hamedan	2
H	Damash Gilan	w/o
A	Yazd Louleh
H	Saipa	0(3)
A	Naft Masjed Soleyman	0(4)
H	Tractor	w/o
A	Machine Sazi Tabriz

Round of 16
H	Esteghlal	2
A	Malavan	0
H	Zob Ahan	1
A	Naft Tehran	0
A	Naft Omidiyeh	1
H	Mes Kerman	2
A	Gostaresh Foolad	1(2)
H	Sanat Naft	1(4)
H	Persepolis	2
A	Alvand Hamedan	0
A	Foolad Novin Ahvaz
H	Foolad	w/o
A	Rah Ahan Sorinet	1
H	Damash Gilan	0
H	Naft Masjed Soleyman	0
A	Tractor	2

Quarter-Final
A	Esteghlal	1
H	Zob Ahan	0
H	Mes Kerman	3
A	Sanat Naft	1
A	Persepolis	1(0)
H	Foolad	1(3)
H	Rah Ahan Sorinet	0
A	Tractor	2

Semi-Final
H	Esteghlal	1
A	Mes Kerman	2
A	Foolad	0
H	Tractor	1

Final
Mes Kerman	0
Tractor	1

Note: H: Home team, A: Away team

=== Fifth round (round of 32) ===
10 December 2013 72	Esteghlal	1–0	Caspian Qazvin	Tehran
	Oladi 41'			Stadium: Azadi Stadium; Attendance: 14,000

29 October 2013 73	Malavan	1–0 (a.e.t.)	Mes Rafsanjan	Bandar Anzali
15:00 IST+03:30	Saghebi 97'			Stadium: Takhti Stadium; Attendance: 7,000

29 October 2013 74	Payam Sanat Amol	1–2	Zob Ahan	Amol
15:00 IST+03:30	Niknejhad 48'		Tabrizi 33'; Salsali 68'	Stadium: Workers Ejwarkolah; Attendance: 1,500

29 October 2013 75	Naft Tehran	3–1 (a.e.t.)	Parseh Tehran	Tehran
15:00 IST+03:30	Hajmohammadi 76'; Ghorbani 102'; Navidkia 114'		Parvin 48'	Stadium: Shahid Dastgerdi Stadium; Attendance: 1,000

29 October 2013 76	Saba Qom	0–1	Naft Omidiyeh	Qom
15:00 IST+03:30			Fathi 45+2'	Stadium: Yadegar-e Emam Stadium; Attendance: 2,000

8 November 2013 77	Shahrdari Dezful	1–3	Mes Kerman	Dezful
15:00 IST+03:30	Alidadi 90+1'		Eslami 7'; Edinho 22'; Goudarzi 68'	Stadium: Shahrdari Dezful Stadium; Attendance: 1,000

29 October 2013 78	Gostaresh Foolad	w/o	Minab Toyur Hormozgan	Tabriz
15:00 IST+03:30				Stadium: Gostaresh Foulad Stadium
Note: Minab Toyur withdrew

29 October 2013 79	Sanat Naft	1–0	Sepahan	Abadan
16:00 IST+03:30	Taherifard 89'			Stadium: Takhti Stadium; Attendance: 20,000

23 October 2013 80	Persepolis	5–1 (a.e.t.)	Padideh Mashhad	Tehran
16:45 IST+03:30	Abbaszadeh 48'; Noormohammadi 94'; Shakeri 110'; Gharibi 114'; Norouzi 117'		Tahmasebi 86'	Stadium: Azadi Stadium; Attendance: 22,000

23 October 2013 81	Alvand Hamedan	1–1 (a.e.t.) (6–5 p)	Esteghlal Khuzestan	Hamedan
15:00 IST+03:30	Akbari 58'		Traoré 29' (pen.)	Stadium: Qods Stadium; Attendance: 3,000

23 October 2013 82	Foolad Novin Ahvaz	w/o	Fajr Sepasi	Ahvaz
15:00 IST+03:30				Stadium: Takhti Stadium

29 October 2013 83	Foolad	w/o	Foolad Yazd	Ahvaz
15:00 IST+03:30				Stadium: Ghadir Stadium
	Penalties
			Foolad Yazd withdrew

23 October 2013 84	Rah Ahan Sorinet	7–2	Talar Vahdat Hamedan	Tehran
15:00 IST+03:30	Rezaian 23', 33'; Noormohammadi 31'; Abdi 37', 90+5'; Khaleghifar 55' (pen.); Alipour 58'		Ahmadi 71'; Shirzadfar 89' (pen.)	Stadium: Takhti Stadium; Attendance: 3,500

29 October 2013 85	Damash Gilan	w/o	Yazd Louleh	Rasht
15:00 IST+03:30				Stadium: Dr. Azodi Stadium

23 October 2013 86	Saipa	0–0 (a.e.t.) (3–4 p)	Naft Masjed Soleyman	Karaj
15:00 IST+03:30				Stadium: Enghelab Stadium; Attendance: 5,000

3 November 2013 87	Tractor	w/o	Machine Sazi Tabriz	Tabriz
15:00 IST+03:30				Stadium: Sahand Stadium
	Penalties
			Machine Sazi withdrew

=== Sixth round (round of 16) ===
29 December 2013 88	Esteghlal	2–0	Malavan	Tehran
14:25 IST+03:30	Omranzadeh 12', 67'			Stadium: Azadi Stadium; Attendance: 10,000

8 November 2013 89	Zob Ahan	1–0	Naft Tehran	Isfahan
15:00 IST+03:30	Bayatinia 80'			Stadium: Fooladshahr Stadium; Attendance: 4,000

29 December 2013 90	Mes Kerman	2–1	Naft Omidiyeh	Kerman
14:15 IST+03:30	Shojaei 16', 53'		Molaeian 45+1'	Stadium: Shahid Bahonar Stadium; Attendance: 7,000

24 November 2013 91	Sanat Naft	1–1 (a.e.t.) (4–2 p)	Gostaresh Foolad	Abadan
15:00 IST+03:30	Zeyghami 67'		Ansari 74'	Stadium: Takhti Stadium; Attendance: 20,000

1 November 2013 92	Persepolis	2–0	Alvand Hamedan	Tehran
16:40 IST+03:30	Haghighi 12'; Alishah 68'			Stadium: Azadi Stadium; Attendance: 16,000; Referee: Jamshid Daneshmehr

8 November 2013 93	Foolad	w/o	Foolad Novin Ahvaz	Ahvaz
17:45 IST+03:30				Stadium: Ghadir Stadium
Note: Foolad Novin withdrew

8 November 2013 94	Damash Gilan	0–1	Rah Ahan Sorinet	Rasht
15:00 IST+03:30			Khaleghifar 80'	Stadium: Dr. Azodi Stadium; Attendance: 5,000

29 December 2013 95	Naft Masjed Soleyman	0–2	Tractor	Masjed Soleyman
15:00 IST+03:30			Talebi 53'; Ansarifard 55'	Stadium: Shahid Behnam Mohammadi Stadium; Attendance: 1,000

=== Quarter-Final (1/4 Final – Last 8) ===
21 January 2014 96	Zob Ahan	0–1	Esteghlal	Isfahan
16:45 IST+03:30			Samuel 43' (pen.)	Stadium: Fooladshahr Stadium; Attendance: 12,000

16 January 2014 97	Mes Kerman	3–1 (a.e.t.)	Sanat Naft	Kerman
14:00 IST+03:30	Shojaei 71'; Edinho 115'; Fyfe 118'		Aghaei 70'	Stadium: Shahid Bahonar Stadium; Attendance: 9,500

26 January 2014 98	Foolad	1–1 (a.e.t.) (3–0 p)	Persepolis	Ahvaz
16:45 IST+03:30	Rahmani 57'		Abbaszadeh 5'	Stadium: Ghadir Stadium; Attendance: 49,000
	Penalties
	(penalty scored) Badrlou; (penalty scored) Padovani; (penalty scored) Chimba		(penalty missed) Dehnavi; (penalty missed) Mahini; (penalty missed) Khalatbari

21 January 2014 99	Rah Ahan Sorinet	0–2	Tractor	Tehran
14:00 IST+03:30			Daghighi 16'; Ansarifard 61'	Stadium: Takhti Stadium; Attendance: 2,000

=== Semi-final (1/2 final – last 4) ===
4 February 2014 100	Esteghlal	1–2	Mes Kerman	Tehran
16:00	Sadeghi 12'		Edinho 7', 85'	Stadium: Azadi Stadium; Attendance: 18,000

4 February 2014 101	Tractor	1–0	Foolad	Tabriz
14:30	Daghighi 76'			Stadium: Sahand Stadium; Attendance: 30,000

=== Final ===
14 February 2014 102	Mes Kerman	0–1	Tractor	Kerman
16:10			Daghighi 51'	Stadium: Shahid Bahonar Stadium; Attendance: 15,000; Referee: Yadollah Jahanbazi

== See also ==
- Iran Pro League 2013–14
- Azadegan League 2013–14
- Iran Football's 2nd Division 2013–14
- Iran Football's 3rd Division 2013–14
- Iranian Super Cup
- Futsal Super League 2013–14
