= 2015–16 League 2 (Iran) =

Iran Football's 2nd Division
- Season: 2015–16
- Champions: Oxin Alborz, Sepidrood Rasht
- Promoted: Sepidrood Rasht; Oxin Alborz; Pars Jam
- Relegated: Meli Poshan; Persepolis Ganaveh; Yaran Ghadir Alborz; Kargar Boneh Gaz; Shahrdari Kamyaran; Tarbiat Novin; Haf Semnan; Moghavemat Tehran; Payam Mashhad; Aboumoslem; Sanat Sari; Alvand Hamedan

2015–16 Iran Football's 2nd Division was the 15th under 2nd Division since its establishment (current format) in 2001. The season featured 25 teams from the 2nd Division 2014–15, seven new teams relegated from the 2014–15 Azadegan League: Tarbiat Novin, Naft Gachsaran, Niroo Zamini, Etka Gorgan, Sh. Bandar Abbas, Rahian Kermanshah, Esteghlal Ahvaz and four new teams promoted from the 3rd Division 2014–15: Moghavemat Tehran, Kara Shiraz, Shahrdari Mahshahr, Rahpouyan Rezvanshahr.

== Teams ==
=== Stadia and locations ===
Locations of clubs in 2015–16 Iran Football's 2nd Division

== First round ==
=== Group A ===
Pos	Team	Pld	W	D	L	GF	GA	GD	Pts	Qualification or relegation
1	Oxin Alborz	18	10	7	1	30	9	+21	37	Second Round
2	Sh. Bandar Abbas	18	10	6	2	26	8	+18	36	Second Round
3	Niroo Zamini	18	9	5	4	27	16	+11	32	Second Round
4	Be'sat Kermanshah	18	7	8	3	30	15	+15	29	
5	Bargh Jadid Shiraz	18	8	5	5	21	10	+11	29	
6	Karun Khuzestan	18	5	4	9	23	20	+3	19	
7	Sh. Kashan	18	4	7	7	20	25	−5	19	
8	Meli Poshan	18	4	7	7	10	17	−7	19	Relegation to Iran Football's 3rd Division
9	Per. Ganaveh	18	5	4	9	14	24	−10	19	Relegation to Iran Football's 3rd Division
10	Yaran Ghadir Alborz	18	0	1	17	8	65	−57	1	Relegation to Iran Football's 3rd Division

Updated to match(es) played on 24 February 2016. Source:
Rules for classification: 1) points; 2) goal difference; 3) number of goals scored.

=== Group B ===
Pos	Team	Pld	W	D	L	GF	GA	GD	Pts	Qualification or relegation
1	Baadraan Tehran	18	11	4	3	34	16	+18	37	Second Round
2	Pars Jonoubi Jam	18	10	5	3	24	8	+16	35	Second Round
3	Kimia Farayand	18	10	5	3	28	13	+15	35	Second Round
4	Sh. Mahshahr	18	10	3	5	34	23	+11	33	
5	Mahan Shoshtar	18	7	5	6	21	17	+4	26	
6	Sardar Bukan	18	7	3	8	14	20	−6	24	
7	Sh. Tabriz	18	5	8	5	17	15	+2	23	
8	Sh. Kamyaran	18	5	4	9	25	28	−3	19	Relegation to Iran Football's 3rd Division
9	Kargar Boneh Gaz	18	4	2	12	15	27	−12	14	Relegation to Iran Football's 3rd Division
10	Tarbiat Novin	18	0	3	15	4	49	−45	3	Relegation to Iran Football's 3rd Division

Updated to match(es) played on 24 February 2016. Source:
Rules for classification: 1) points; 2) goal difference; 3) number of goals scored.

=== Group C ===
Pos	Team	Pld	W	D	L	GF	GA	GD	Pts	Qualification or relegation
1	Naft va Gaz Gachsaran	18	8	7	3	16	11	+5	31	Second Round
2	Naft Omidiyeh	18	8	6	4	23	15	+8	30	Second Round
3	Kara Shiraz	18	7	7	4	21	15	+6	28	Second Round
4	Caspian Qazvin	18	6	10	2	15	9	+6	28	
5	Sanat Naft Novin	18	7	6	5	21	17	+4	27	
6	Esteghlal B Tehran	18	5	6	7	19	21	−2	21	
7	Sh. Jooybar	18	4	7	7	12	15	−3	19	
8	Haf Semnan	18	3	10	5	16	22	−6	19	Relegation to Iran Football's 3rd Division
9	Moghavemat Tehran	18	4	5	9	17	25	−8	17	Relegation to Iran Football's 3rd Division
10	Aboumoslem	18	4	4	10	13	23	−10	16	Relegation to Iran Football's 3rd Division

Updated to match(es) played on 24 February 2016. Source:
Rules for classification: 1) points; 2) goal difference; 3) number of goals scored.

=== Group D ===
Pos	Team	Pld	W	D	L	GF	GA	GD	Pts	Qualification or relegation
1	Shahin Bushehr	18	10	5	3	30	15	+15	35	Second Round
2	Sepidrood	18	9	6	3	23	16	+7	33	Second Round
3	Rahpouyan Rezvanshahr	18	9	6	3	23	17	+6	33	Second Round
4	Tose'e Kish	18	8	7	3	26	17	+9	31	
5	Khalkhal Dasht	18	7	6	5	27	19	+8	27	
6	Foolad B	18	7	5	6	27	22	+5	26	
7	Sh. Urmia	18	5	6	7	21	23	−2	21	
8	Payam Vahdat Khorasan	18	4	4	10	23	35	−12	16	Relegation to Iran Football's 3rd Division
9	Sanat Sari	18	2	5	11	13	35	−22	11	Relegation to Iran Football's 3rd Division
10	Alvand Hamedan	18	2	4	12	23	37	−14	10	Relegation to Iran Football's 3rd Division

Updated to match(es) played on 23 February 2016. Source:
Rules for classification: 1) points; 2) goal difference; 3) number of goals scored.

== Second round ==
=== Group A ===
Pos	Team	Pld	W	D	L	GF	GA	GD	Pts	Promotion or qualification
1	Oxin Alborz	10	6	2	2	14	15	−1	20	Promotion to Azadegan League 2016–17
2	Pars Jonoubi Jam	10	4	4	2	12	8	+4	16	2nd Division 2015–16 play-off
3	Naft Omidiyeh	10	3	5	2	15	10	+5	14	
4	Shahin Bushehr	10	3	3	4	18	15	+3	12	
5	Niroye Zamini	10	2	3	5	8	12	−4	9	
6	Rahpouyan Rezvanshahr	10	2	3	5	13	20	−7	9	

Updated to match(es) played on May 2016. Source:
Rules for classification: 1) points; 2) goal difference; 3) number of goals scored.

=== Group B ===
Pos	Team	Pld	W	D	L	GF	GA	GD	Pts	Promotion or qualification
1	Sepidrood	10	6	2	2	9	5	+4	20	Promotion to Azadegan League 2016–17
2	Naft va Gaz Gachsaran	10	5	3	2	15	11	+4	18	2nd Division 2015–16 play-off
3	Baadraan Tehran	10	5	2	3	11	6	+5	17	
4	Kimia Farayand	10	4	2	4	13	12	+1	14	
5	Sh. Bandar Abbas	10	2	2	6	9	14	−5	8	
6	Kara Shiraz	10	1	3	6	8	17	−9	6	

Updated to match(es) played on May 2016. Source:
Rules for classification: 1) points; 2) goal difference; 3) number of goals scored.

== 2nd Division Play-off ==
Team 1	Agg.	Team 2	1st leg	2nd leg
Pars Jonoubi Jam	4–0	Naft va Gaz Gachsaran	2–0	2–0

Pars Jonoubi Jam as 2nd-placed team of Group A will faced Naft va Gaz Gachsaran as 2nd-placed team of Group B in a two-legged play-off.

24 May 2015
15:30 CEST

Pars Jonoubi Jam	2 – 0	Naft va Gaz Gachsaran

Takhti Jam, Jam
Attendance: 4,000
31 May 2015
17:30 CEST

Naft va Gaz Gachsaran	0 – 2	Pars Jonoubi Jam
	Report

Shohada Naft va Gaz Gachsaran, Gachsaran
Attendance: 3,000

Pars Jonoubi Jam won 4–0 on aggregate and promoted to the next season of Azadegan League.
