= 2014 Hazfi Cup final =

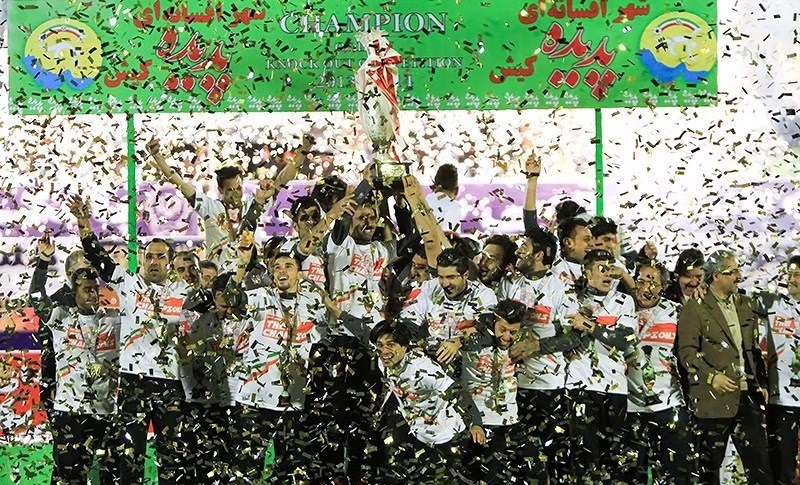
- Event: 2013–14 Hazfi Cup
Mes Kerman	Tractor
0	1
- Date: 14 February 2014
- Venue: Shahid Bahonar Stadium, Kerman
- Man of the Match: Saeid Daghighi
- Fans' Man of the Match: Karim Ansarifard
- Referee: Yadollah Jahanbazi
- Attendance: 14,855
- Weather: Cloudy; 17 °C (63 °F); 12% humidity

The 2014 Hazfi Cup final was the 27th final since 1975. The match was between Mes Kerman and Tractor which Tractor won the match 1–0, with Saeid Daghighi scored in the 51st minute. Tractor qualified for the group stage of the 2015 AFC Champions League as the winner of the tournament.

== Format ==
The tie was contested over one legs, simply to last edition. If the teams could still not be separated, then extra time would have been played with a penalty shootout (taking place if the teams were still level after that).

== Road to the finals ==
=== Mes Kerman ===
Round	Opposition	Score
5th	Shahrdari Dezful (a)	1–3
6th	Naft Omidiyeh (h)	2–1
QF	Sanat Naft (h)	3–1
SF	Esteghlal (a)	1–2

Mes Kerman began their work in the tournament with coach Parviz Mazloomi. They beat 2nd Division side Shahrdari Dezful in their home in Dezful, Ahvaz 3–1 with goals from Eslami, Edinho and Goudarzi. At Round of 16, Mes defeated another 2nd Division League club, Naft Omidiyeh at Kerman. In the next round, they beat current Azadegan League and former Iran Pro League side Sanat Naft in extra time to reach to the Last 4. In semi-final they defeated Iran Pro League leaders Esteghlal with a late goal from Edinho, this time with Luka Bonačić. The result saw that Mes advanced to the final for the first time and Esteghlal failed to reach to their 10th final appearance.

=== Tractor ===
Round	Opposition	Score
5th	Machine Sazi (h)	3–0
6th	Naft Masjed Soleyman (a)	0–2
QF	Rah Ahan (a)	0–2
SF	Foolad (h)	1–0

Tractor was drawn in the fifth round with another Tabriz based club, Machine Sazi. Machine Sazi withdrew in favor to support Tractor in the tournament and Tractor awarded a 3–0 win. In Round of 16, Tractor defeated Naft Masjed Soleyman 2–0 with goals comes from Talebi and Ansarifard. In 1/4 Final, they beat Rah Ahan 2–0 at Takhti Stadium. Daghighi and Ansarifard scored Tractor's goals at the match. Tractor defeated Foolad 1–0 in 1/2 Final and reached the final with Daghighi scored the only goal of the match, held in Sahand Stadium.

== Pre-match ==
=== Match history ===
This was Mes Kerman's first Hazfi final and Tractor's third appearance in the final match of the tournament. Both teams never won the title in their history before the match. Tractor's first final was in 1976 edition which they was defeated by Malavan in Amjadieh Stadium. Next time was in 1995 which they lost the final match to Bahman 2–1 on aggregate.

=== Ticketing ===
Ticket prices for the final was 5,000 toman. 50% of the stadium were belongs to the Mes Kerman's fans and others were belong to Tractor's fans.

=== Venue ===
The final was decided with draw which 15,000 capacity Shahid Bahonar Stadium (the Mes Kemran's home Stadium) was announced as the venue for the final.

=== Officials ===
FIFA listed referee, Yadollah Jahanbazi was announced as the final match referee by IRIFF's referees committee. Mohammad Reza Abolfazli and Ali Mirzabeigi assisted him. Moud Bonyadifar was also fourth official.

== Details ==
14 February 2014
16:10 (UTC+3:30)

Mes Kerman	0–1	Tractor
	Report	Daghighi 51'

Shahid Bahonar Stadium, Kerman
Attendance: 14,855
Referee: Yadollah Jahanbazi

Mes Kerman	Tractor

Mes Kerman:5–3–2
GK	1	(Iran) Arman Shahdadnejad
DF	2	(Iran) Farhad Salaripour
DF	3	(Iran) Mojtaba Tarshiz
DF	5	(Iran) Alireza Ebrahimi	(substituted off) 69'
DF	14	(Iran) Pouria Seifpanahi	(substituted off) 46'
DF	90	(Iran) Sheys Rezaei
MF	6	(Iran) Ahmad Reza Zendeh Rouh
MF	8	(Iran) Farzad Hosseinkhani (c)
MF	17	(Iran) Milad Jahani
FW	10	(Iran) Mostafa Shojaei	(substituted off) 81'
FW	30	(Brazil) Edinho
Substitutes:
GK	33	(Iran) Hassan Roudbarian
DF	16	(Iran) Sajjad Hosseinzadeh	(substituted on) 46'
DF	23	(Australia) Iain Fyfe
DF	35	(Iran) Mohammad Vahid Esmaeil Beigi	(substituted on) 69'
MF	24	(Iran) Mohammad Abshak
MF	27	(Brazil) Juninho
FW	11	(Iran) Karim Eslami	(substituted on) 81'
Manager:
(Croatia) Luka Bonačić

Tractor:3–4–3
GK	1	(Iran) Hamed Lak
DF	20	(Iran) Mohammad Nosrati
DF	34	(Iran) Milad Fakhreddini
DF	88	(Iran) Morteza Asadi (c)
MF	6	(Iran) Mehdi Kiani	(yellow card) 7'
MF	7	(Iran) Mehdi Karimian
MF	8	(Iran) Ali Karimi		(substituted off) 88'
MF	9	(Iran) Javad Kazemian		(substituted off) 65'
FW	10	(Iran) Saeid Daghighi	(yellow card) 69'		(substituted off) 81'
FW	11	(Iran) Karim Ansarifard	(yellow card) 81'
FW	13	(Iran) Masoud Ebrahimzadeh
Substitutes:
GK	22	(Iran) Davoud Noshi Sofiani
DF	4	(Iran) Farshid Talebi		(substituted on) 88'
MF	17	(Iran) Meysam Baou
MF	18	(Brazil) Rodrigo Pimpão		(substituted on) 65'
MF	28	(Iran) Mohammad Hossein Mehrazma
FW	14	(Iran) Mohammad Ebrahimi
FW	27	(Iran) Farshad Ahmadzadeh		(substituted on) 81'
Manager:
(Portugal) Toni

Man of the match

- (Iran) Saeid Daghighi (Tractor)

Assistant referees:
Mohammad Reza Abolfazli
Ali Mirzabeigi
Fourth official:
Moud Bonyadifar

Match rules:

- 90 minutes
- 30 minutes of extra-time if necessary
- Penalty shoot-out if scores still level
- Seven named substitutes
- Maximum of three substitutions

== See also ==
- 2013–14 Persian Gulf Cup
- 2013–14 Azadegan League
- 2013–14 Iran Football's 2nd Division
- 2013–14 Iran Football's 3rd Division
- 2013–14 Hazfi Cup
- Iranian Super Cup
- 2013–14 Iranian Futsal Super League
