= 2012–13 Iran Football's 3rd Division =

Iran Football's 3rd Division
- Season: 2012–13
- Matches: 533
- Goals: 1,309 (2.46 per match)

The article contains information about the 2012–13 Iran 3rd Division football season. This is the 4th rated football league in Iran after the Persian Gulf Cup, Azadegan League, and 2nd Division. The league started from September 2012.

In total and in the first round, 70 teams will compete in 9 different groups. From the first round, 18 teams go through the second round. In the second round 18 teams will be divided in three groups of 6, where the winner of each group will be directly promoted to 2013–14 Iran Football's 2nd Division. The three group runner-up and the best third place team will go through play-off matches, where the two play-off winners also will be promoted. Therefore, in total, five team will be promoted from this league to Iran Football's 2nd Division.

== Teams ==
The following 70 teams will compete in 2012–13 Iran Football's 3rd Division season.

- Aria Khorramdarreh Zanjan
- Arman Reza Mashhad
- Bahman Ilam
- Bahman Shiraz
- Behineh Rahbar Abadeh
- Daam & Toyour Ravansar
- Danial Shomal Fuman
- Esteghlal Darband Khomein
- Esteghlal Javan Babakan
- Esteghlal Jonub Tehran
- Esteghlal Rey
- Etehad Aleshtar Lorestan
- Fajr Nikan Tehran
- Fajr Rafsanjan
- Helal Ahmar Gerash
- Hemat Gonbad
- Heyat Football Babol
- Homa Bandar Deylam
- Homa Qom
- Isar Jiroft
- Kargar Boneh Gez
- Karoun Ahvaz
- Khazar Mahmoudabad
- Khalkhal Dasht Ardebil
- Mahtab Baft Shafagh
- Mehr Hamedan
- Mes Novin Kerman
- Mes Shahr-e Babak
- Mostafalou Tabriz
- Nabard Shahrekord
- Naftoon Tehran
- Oghab Tehran
- Omid Hassanabad
- Omid Kish
- Pars Football Chaloos
- Payam Sanat Amol
- Persepolis Novin Tehran
- Pershiaan Zanjan
- Persian Mahram Qazvin
- Piroozi Garmsar
- Piroozi Shirvan
- Rahian Velayat Tehran
- Safahan Isfahan
- Sedaghat Astara
- Sepahan Novin
- Sepidrood Astaneh
- Shahin Kuhrang Shahrekord
- Shahrdari Behshahr
- Shahrdari Dizicheh
- Shahrdari Eslamshahr
- Shahrdari Gachsaran
- Shahrdari Jouybar
- Shahrdari Kamyaran
- Shahrdari Mahabad
- Shahrdari Mahshahr
- Shahrdari Mamasani
- Shahrdari Nazarabad
- Shahrdari Naghadeh
- Shahrdari Konarak
- Shahrdari Novin Bandar Abbas
- Shahrdari Qorveh
- Shahrdari Quchan
- Shamoushak Noshahr
- Siman Behbahan
- Sorkhpooshan Khorramabad
- Tose'eh & Omran Ferdows
- Tohid Bushehr
- Vahdat Khavaran Birjand
- Zob Ahan Novin
- Zoratkaran Parsabad

== First round (standings) ==
=== Group 1 ===
Pos	Team	Pld	W	D	L	GF	GA	GD	Pts	Qualification or relegation
1	Pars Football Chaloos	14	8	3	3	19	12	+7	27	Promotion to the second round
2	Piroozi Shirvan	14	7	5	2	26	10	+16	26	Promotion to the second round
3	Shahrdari Quchan	14	7	4	3	16	9	+7	25	
4	Arman Reza Mashhad	14	6	5	3	22	17	+5	23	
5	Oghab Tehran	14	4	5	5	16	11	+5	17	Relegation to the Provincial Leagues
6	Shahrdari Behshahr	14	2	9	3	6	8	−2	15	Relegation to the Provincial Leagues
7	Hemat Gonbad	14	2	4	8	12	22	−10	10	Relegation to the Provincial Leagues
8	Shahrdari Eslamshahr	14	1	3	10	8	36	−28	6	Relegation to the Provincial Leagues

Updated to match(es) played on 5 March 2013. Source:
Rules for classification: 1) points; 2) goal difference; 3) number of goals scored.

=== Group 2 ===
Pos	Team	Pld	W	D	L	GF	GA	GD	Pts	Qualification or relegation
1	Shamoushak Noshahr	14	10	0	4	21	12	+9	30	Promotion to the second round
2	Shahrdari Jouybar	14	8	4	2	22	6	+16	28	Promotion to the second round
3	Mahtab Baft Shaft	14	8	3	3	18	12	+6	27	
4	Persepolis Novin Tehran	14	7	3	4	29	9	+20	24	
5	Fajr Nikan Tehran	14	5	2	7	17	17	0	17	Relegation to the Provincial Leagues
6	Piroozi Garmsar	14	5	1	8	17	28	−11	16	Relegation to the Provincial Leagues
7	Sedaghat Astara	14	3	2	9	9	21	−12	11	Relegation to the Provincial Leagues
8	Khazar Mahmoudabad	14	1	3	10	4	32	−28	6	Relegation to the Provincial Leagues

Updated to match(es) played on 5 March 2013. Source:
Rules for classification: 1) points; 2) goal difference; 3) number of goals scored.

=== Group 3 ===
Pos	Team	Pld	W	D	L	GF	GA	GD	Pts	Qualification or relegation
1	Payam Sanat Amol	12	8	4	0	20	6	+14	28	Promotion to the second round
2	Heyat Football Babol	12	7	3	2	23	12	+11	24	Promotion to the second round
3	Shahrdari Nazarabad	12	7	2	3	18	10	+8	23	
4	Sepidrood Astaneh	12	6	0	6	14	19	−5	18	
5	Esteghlal Rey	12	3	2	7	13	14	−1	11	Relegation to the Provincial Leagues
6	Danial Shomal Fuman	12	3	1	8	7	15	−8	10	Relegation to the Provincial Leagues
7	Persian Mahram Qazvin	12	1	2	9	5	24	−19	5	Relegation to the Provincial Leagues

Updated to match(es) played on 5 March 2013. Source:
Rules for classification: 1) points; 2) goal difference; 3) number of goals scored.

=== Group 4 ===
Pos	Team	Pld	W	D	L	GF	GA	GD	Pts	Qualification or relegation
1	Mostafalou Tabriz	14	10	4	0	31	9	+22	34	Promotion to the second round
2	Naftoon Tehran	14	9	4	1	27	7	+20	31	Promotion to the second round
3	Esteghlal Jonub Tehran	14	9	3	2	33	14	+19	30	
4	Khalkhal Dasht Ardebil	14	6	5	3	25	9	+16	23	
5	Shahrdari Mahabad	14	6	3	5	18	12	+6	21	Relegation to the Provincial Leagues
6	Aria Khorramdarreh Zanjan	14	3	0	11	7	31	−24	9	Relegation to the Provincial Leagues
7	Zoratkaran Parsabad	14	2	1	11	14	39	−25	7	Relegation to the Provincial Leagues
8	Pershiaan Zanjan	14	1	0	13	6	40	−34	3	Relegation to the Provincial Leagues

Updated to match(es) played on 5 March 2013. Source:
Rules for classification: 1) points; 2) goal difference; 3) number of goals scored.

=== Group 5 ===
Pos	Team	Pld	W	D	L	GF	GA	GD	Pts	Qualification or relegation
1	Omid Hassanabad	14	10	2	2	24	8	+16	32	Promotion to the second round
2	Nabard Shahrekord	14	9	4	1	27	10	+17	31	Promotion to the second round
3	Zob Ahan Novin	14	9	3	2	29	7	+22	30	
4	Sorkhpooshan Khorramabad	14	9	0	5	23	11	+12	27	
5	Esteghlal Darband Khomein	14	5	0	9	16	23	−7	15	Relegation to the Provincial Leagues
6	Safahan Isfahan	14	4	1	9	15	27	−12	13	Relegation to the Provincial Leagues
7	Etehad Aleshtar Lorestan	14	2	1	11	5	28	−23	7	Relegation to the Provincial Leagues
8	Homa Qom	14	2	1	11	13	38	−25	7	Relegation to the Provincial Leagues

Updated to match(es) played on 5 March 2012. Source:
Rules for classification: 1) points; 2) goal difference; 3) number of goals scored.

=== Group 6 ===
Pos	Team	Pld	W	D	L	GF	GA	GD	Pts	Qualification or relegation
1	Shahrdari Naghadeh	14	7	5	2	26	9	+17	26	Promotion to the second round
2	Karoun Ahvaz	14	7	5	2	20	10	+10	26	Promotion to the second round
3	Rahian Velayat Tehran	14	7	4	3	24	12	+12	25	
4	Daam & Toyour Ravansar	14	5	6	3	16	16	0	21	
5	Shahrdari Kamyaran	14	5	6	3	16	17	−1	21	Relegation to the Provincial Leagues
6	Shahrdari Qorveh	14	4	4	6	16	17	−1	16	Relegation to the Provincial Leagues
7	Mehr Hamedan	14	3	3	8	9	24	−15	12	Relegation to the Provincial Leagues
8	Bahman Ilam	14	1	1	12	10	32	−22	4	Relegation to the Provincial Leagues

Updated to match(es) played on 5 March 2013. Source:
Rules for classification: 1) points; 2) goal difference; 3) number of goals scored.

=== Group 7 ===
Pos	Team	Pld	W	D	L	GF	GA	GD	Pts	Qualification or relegation
1	Bahman Shiraz	14	11	1	2	28	5	+23	34	Promotion to the second round
2	Touhid Bushehr	14	6	4	4	18	13	+5	22	Promotion to the second round
3	Esteghlal Javan Babakan	14	6	4	4	19	17	+2	22	
4	Shahrdari Dizicheh	14	5	6	3	22	16	+6	21	
5	Shahrdari Gachsaran	14	5	4	5	16	16	0	19	Relegation to the Provincial Leagues
6	Behineh Rahbar Abadeh	14	4	5	5	20	15	+5	17	Relegation to the Provincial Leagues
7	Sepahan Novin	14	4	4	6	15	22	−7	16	Relegation to the Provincial Leagues
8	Shahin Kuhrang Shahrekord	14	0	2	12	2	36	−34	2	Relegation to the Provincial Leagues

Updated to match(es) played on 5 March 2013. Source:
Rules for classification: 1) points; 2) goal difference; 3) number of goals scored.

=== Group 8 ===
Pos	Team	Pld	W	D	L	GF	GA	GD	Pts	Qualification or relegation
1	Shahrdari Mahshahr	14	6	5	3	12	7	+5	23	Promotion to the second round
2	Kargar Boneh Gez	14	5	7	2	20	14	+6	22	Promotion to the second round
3	Helal Ahmar Gerash	14	5	6	3	21	18	+3	21	
4	Omid Kish	14	6	3	5	14	14	0	21	
5	Homa Bandar Deylam	14	5	5	4	13	13	0	20	Relegation to the Provincial Leagues
6	Siman Behbahan	14	5	4	5	15	14	+1	19	Relegation to the Provincial Leagues
7	Mes Shahr-e Babak	14	2	6	6	11	17	−6	12	Relegation to the Provincial Leagues
8	Shahrdari Mamasani	14	1	6	7	7	16	−9	9	Relegation to the Provincial Leagues

Updated to match(es) played on 5 March 2013. Source:
Rules for classification: 1) points; 2) goal difference; 3) number of goals scored.

=== Group 9 ===
Pos	Team	Pld	W	D	L	GF	GA	GD	Pts	Qualification or relegation
1	Tose'eh & Omran Ferdows	12	9	1	2	32	14	+18	28	Promotion to the second round
2	Vahdat Khavaran Birjand	12	8	2	2	24	7	+17	26	Promotion to the second round
3	Mes Novin Kerman	12	7	2	3	29	9	+20	23	
4	Shahrdari Novin Bnadar Abbas	12	6	3	3	20	11	+9	21	
5	Fajr Rafsanjan	12	5	2	5	12	14	−2	17	Relegation to the Provincial Leagues
6	Isar Jiroft	12	1	1	10	9	31	−22	4	Relegation to the Provincial Leagues
7	Shahrdari Konarak	12	0	1	11	2	42	−40	1	Relegation to the Provincial Leagues

Updated to match(es) played on 5 March 2013. Source:
Rules for classification: 1) points; 2) goal difference; 3) number of goals scored.

== Second round (standings) ==
=== Group A ===
Pos	Team	Pld	W	D	L	GF	GA	GD	Pts	Promotion or qualification
1	Payam Sanat Amol	7	5	1	1	10	4	+6	16	Promotion to the 2nd Division 2013–14
2	Shahrdari Jouybar	7	4	2	1	20	2	+18	14	Promotion play-off
3	Pars Football Chaloos	7	3	3	1	6	4	+2	12	
4	Heyat Football Babol	7	3	2	2	12	8	+4	11	
5	Shamoushak Noshahr	7	0	3	4	4	8	−4	3	
6	Piroozi Shirvan	7	0	1	6	5	31	−26	1	

Updated to match(es) played on 22 April 2013. Source:
Rules for classification: 1) points; 2) goal difference; 3) number of goals scored.

=== Group B ===
Pos	Team	Pld	W	D	L	GF	GA	GD	Pts	Promotion or qualification
1	Karoun Ahvaz	5	2	3	0	7	4	+3	9	Promotion to the 2nd Division 2013–14
2	Mostafalou Tabriz	5	2	3	0	2	0	+2	9	Promotion play-off
3	Naftoon Tehran	5	2	2	1	4	3	+1	8	
4	Omid Hassanabad	5	1	3	1	5	2	+3	6	
5	Nabard Shahrekord	5	2	0	3	4	5	−1	6	
6	Shahrdari Naghadeh	5	0	1	4	2	10	−8	1	

Updated to match(es) played on 22 April 2013. Source:
Rules for classification: 1) points; 2) goal difference; 3) number of goals scored.

=== Group C ===
Pos	Team	Pld	W	D	L	GF	GA	GD	Pts	Promotion or qualification
1	Bahman Shiraz	7	4	3	0	10	3	+7	15	Promotion to the 2nd Division 2013–14
2	Tose'eh & Omran Ferdows	7	3	3	1	7	4	+3	12	Promotion play-off
3	Kargar Boneh Gez	7	2	4	1	7	6	+1	10	
4	Vahdat Khavaran Birjand	7	1	5	1	6	6	0	8	
5	Shahrdari Mahshahr	7	0	4	3	3	9	−6	4	
6	Touhid Bushehr	7	0	3	4	2	7	−5	3	

Updated to match(es) played on 22 April 2013. Source:
Rules for classification: 1) points; 2) goal difference; 3) number of goals scored.
