= 2014–15 League 2 (Iran) =

Iran Football's 2nd Division
- Season: 2014–15
- Champions: Aluminium Arak
- Promoted: Bahman Shiraz; Aluminium Arak; Kheybar Khorramabad
- Relegated: Hafari Ahvaz; Vahdat Qom; Gahar; Grand Bojnord; Persepolis Shomal; Badr Hormozgan; Sh. Yasuj; Shohadaye Shahrekord
- Matches: 51
- Goals: 106 (2.08 per match)
- Biggest home win: Shahrdari Yasuj 5–0 Tarbiat Ilam
- Biggest away win: Shahrdari Dezful 0–5 Sepidrood Rasht
- Highest scoring: Esteghlal B Tehran 5–3 Shahrdari Kamyaran
- Longest winning run: 4 matches Khooneh Be Khooneh
- Longest losing run: 3 matches Persepolis Ganaveh

The article contains the team standings and other information of 2nd Division's 2014/15 football season. 2nd Division is the third tier of the Iranian football league system, after the Azadegan League and Persian Gulf Cup.

The league is composed of 40 teams divided into four divisions of 10 teams each, whose teams will be divided geographically. Teams will play only other teams in their own division, once at home and once away for a total of 20 matches each.

== First round ==
=== Group A ===
Pos	Team	Pld	W	D	L	GF	GA	GD	Pts	Qualification or relegation
1	Aluminium Arak	16	9	7	0	23	8	+15	34	Second round
2	Caspian Qazvin	16	9	3	4	18	10	+8	30	Second round
3	Kheybar Khorramabad	16	7	6	3	19	17	+2	27	Second round
4	Arad Isfahan	16	7	4	5	16	13	+3	25	
5	Sanat Sari	16	5	5	6	15	17	−2	20	
6	Karun Khuzestan	16	4	4	8	18	15	+3	16	
7	Per. Ganaveh	16	4	3	9	11	18	−7	15	
8	Meli Poshan	16	3	6	7	18	29	−11	15	
9	Shohadaye Shahrekord (R)	16	4	2	10	16	26	−10	14	Relegation to 2015–16 3rd Division
10	Albadr Bandar Kong (R)	0	0	0	0	0	0	0	0	Relegation to 2015–16 3rd Division

Updated to match(es) played on 16 February 2015. Source:
Rules for classification: 1) points; 2) goal difference; 3) number of goals scored.
(R) Relegated

=== Group B ===
Pos	Team	Pld	W	D	L	GF	GA	GD	Pts	Qualification or relegation
1	Pars Jonoubi Jam	18	7	7	4	18	13	+5	28	Second round
2	Be'sat Kermanshah	18	6	10	2	14	11	+3	28	Second round
3	Aboumoslem	18	6	9	3	20	16	+4	27	Second round
4	Sanat Naft Novin	18	7	5	6	21	17	+4	26	
5	Hamun Sazeh	18	7	5	6	16	13	+3	26	
6	Payam Vahdat Khorasan	18	6	7	5	17	14	+3	25	
7	Machine Sazi	18	5	9	4	20	19	+1	24	
8	Shahin Kish	18	6	5	7	26	18	+8	23	
9	Vahdat Qom (R)	18	2	8	8	11	26	−15	14	Relegation to 2015–16 3rd Division
10	Hafari Ahvaz (R)	18	2	7	9	14	26	−12	13	Relegation to 2015–16 3rd Division

Updated to match(es) played on 16 February 2015. Source:
Rules for classification: 1) points; 2) goal difference; 3) number of goals scored.
(R) Relegated

=== Group C ===
Pos	Team	Pld	W	D	L	GF	GA	GD	Pts	Qualification or relegation
1	Sh. Urmia	16	8	4	4	23	16	+7	28	Second round
2	Esteghlal B Tehran	16	7	6	3	25	15	+10	27	Second round
3	Iranjavan Khoormooj	16	7	6	3	20	13	+7	27	Second round
4	Sh. Kamyaran	16	8	3	5	21	16	+5	27	
5	Khalkhal Dasht	16	7	5	4	17	13	+4	26	
6	Kargar Boneh Gaz	16	5	7	4	18	15	+3	22	
7	Naft Omidiyeh	16	5	7	4	20	18	+2	22	
8	Tarbiat Ilam	16	3	2	11	13	27	−14	11	
9	Sh. Yasouj (R)	16	1	2	13	9	33	−24	5	Relegation to 2015–16 3rd Division
10	Persepolis Shomal (R)	0	0	0	0	0	0	0	0	Relegation to 2015–16 3rd Division

Updated to match(es) played on 16 February 2015. Source:
Rules for classification: 1) points; 2) goal difference; 3) number of goals scored.
(R) Relegated

=== Group D ===
Pos	Team	Pld	W	D	L	GF	GA	GD	Pts	Qualification or relegation
1	Sh. Zanjan	16	9	5	2	24	11	+13	32	Second round
2	Sepidrood	16	9	4	3	27	10	+17	31	Second round
3	Bahman Shiraz	16	9	4	3	17	9	+8	31	Second round
4	Khoneh Be Khoneh	16	8	4	4	16	14	+2	28	
5	Haf Semnan	16	6	3	7	22	24	−2	21	
6	Sh. Jooybar	16	3	8	5	13	17	−4	17	
7	Alvand Hamedan	16	3	6	7	14	18	−4	15	
8	Sh. Dezful	16	3	5	8	13	26	−13	14	
9	Grand Bojnord (R)	16	1	3	12	9	26	−17	6	Relegation to 2015–16 3rd Division
10	Gahar Zagros (R)	0	0	0	0	0	0	0	0	Relegation to 2015–16 3rd Division

Updated to match(es) played on 16 February 2015. Source:
Rules for classification: 1) points; 2) goal difference; 3) number of goals scored.
(R) Relegated

== Second round ==
=== Group A ===
1. Winner Group A
2. 3rd place Group A
3. Winner Group C
4. 3rd place Group C
5. Runner-up Group B
6. Runner-up Group D

Pos	Team	Pld	W	D	L	GF	GA	GD	Pts	Promotion or qualification
1	Aluminium Arak (P)	10	6	3	1	17	8	+9	21	Promotion to Azadegan League 2015–16
2	Kheybar Khorramabad (P)	10	6	2	2	15	12	+3	20	2nd Division 2014–15 play-off
3	Sepidrood	10	2	6	2	11	10	+1	12	
4	Be'sat Kermanshah	10	2	5	3	10	12	−2	11	
5	Sh. Urmia	10	2	2	6	8	14	−6	8	
6	Iranjavan Khoormooj	10	1	4	5	10	15	−5	7	

Updated to match(es) played on 14 May 2015. Source:
Rules for classification: 1) points; 2) goal difference; 3) number of goals scored.
(P) Promoted

=== Group B ===
1. Winner Group B
2. 3rd place Group B
3. Winner Group D
4. 3rd place Group D
5. Runner-up Group A
6. Runner-up Group C

Pos	Team	Pld	W	D	L	GF	GA	GD	Pts	Promotion or qualification
1	Bahman Shiraz (P)	10	3	6	1	8	4	+4	15	Promotion to Azadegan League 2015–16
2	Esteghlal B Tehran	10	4	3	3	12	14	−2	15	2nd Division 2014–15 play-off
3	Pars Jonoubi Jam	10	4	3	3	8	10	−2	15	
4	Sh. Zanjan	10	3	5	2	15	8	+7	14	
5	Caspian Qazvin	10	2	4	4	10	10	0	10	
6	Aboumoslem	10	1	5	4	5	12	−7	8	

Updated to match(es) played on 14 May 2015. Source:
Rules for classification: 1) points; 2) goal difference; 3) number of goals scored.
(P) Promoted

=== Final ===
23 May 2015	Aluminium Arak	3-0	Bahman Shiraz	Arak
				Stadium: Imam Khomeini Stadium

(Bahman Shiraz did not show up, Aluminium Arak awarded championship 2014-15)

== 2nd Division Play-off ==
Team 1	Agg.	Team 2	1st leg	2nd leg
Kheybar Khorramabad	2-1	Esteghlal B Tehran	1-0	1-1
