= 2011–12 Iran Football's 3rd Division =

Iran Football's 3rd Division
- Season: 2011–12
- Champions: Persepolis Ganaveh
- Promoted: Esteghlal Sari; Shahrdari Langarud; Persepolis Ganaveh; Dartak Khoramabad; Mes Soongoun
- Matches: 804
- Goals: 2,170 (2.7 per match)
- Top goalscorer: Mohsen Derikvand (19)

The article contains information about the 2011–12 Iran 3rd Division football season. This is the 4th rated football league in Iran after the Persian Gulf Cup, Azadegan League, and 2nd Division. The league competition started from 2 October 2011.

From the First Round, 12 teams go through the Second Round. From that round four team will be promoted directly to 2012–13 Iran Football's 2nd Division, and two teams go through the play-off where the winner also will be promoted.

== Teams ==
In total and in the first round, 69 teams will compete in 6 different groups. These teams will be divided into the following groups.

=== Group 1 ===
Team	City
Aluminium Hekmati Tabriz	Tabriz
Azar Battery Orumieh	Orumieh
Entezam Tehran	Tehran
Keyvan Mahabad	Mahabad
Mes Soongoun Varzaghan	Varzaghan
Moghavemat Mokerian Mahabad	Mahabad
Naftoon Tehran	Tehran
Shahrdari Fuman	Fuman
Sherkate Khalkhal Dasht	Khalkhal
Zoratkaran Parsabad	Ardebil
-	-
-	-

=== Group 3 ===
Team	City
Atrak Bojnourd	Bojnourd
Esteghlal Jonub	Tehran
Etehad Pakdasht	Pakdasht
Khazar Mahmoudabad	Mahmoudabad
Kimia Aqqala	Aqqala
Nima Chamestan	Chamestan
Pars Football Chaloos	Chaloos
Piroozi Garmsar	Garmsar
Sanaye Shazand	Shazand
Shahrdari Behshahr	Behshahr
Shahrdari Eslamshahr	Eslamshahr
-	-

=== Group 5 ===
Team	City
Anzan Izeh	Izeh
Fajr Khavaran Birjand	Birjand
Mes Novin Kerman	Kerman
Mes Novin Rafsanjan	Rafsanjan
Mes Shahr-e Babak	Shahr-e Babak
Mina Nakhl Minab	Minab
Persepolis Shiraz	Shiraz
Safahan Isfahan	Isfahan
Saravan Sistan-o-Baluchestan	Saravan
Sepahan Novin	Isfahan
Shahrdari Ashkezar	Saduq
Shahrdari Kahnuj	Kahnuj

=== Group 2 ===
Team	City
Alborz Shahdari Zanjan	Zanjan
Armin Qazvin	Qazvin
Esteghlal Sari	Sari
Oghab Tehran	Tehran
Saba Novin Qom	Qom
Sepidrood Astaneh	Astaneh-e Ashrafiyyeh
Shahin Karaj	Karaj
Shahin Tehran	Tehran
Shahrdari Astara	Astara
Shahrdari Chaboksar	Chaboksar
Shahrdari Langarud	Langarud
Talayedaran Buin-Zahra	Buin-Zahra

=== Group 4 ===
Team	City
Darayi Arak	Arak
Dartak Khoramabad	Khoramabad
Golchin Robat Karim	Robat Karim
Fajr Dehloran	Dehloran
Homa Javanroud	Javanroud
Mehr Arak	Arak
Minashi Eslamabad	Eslamabad
Perspolis Darreh Shahr	Darreh Shahr
Shahrdari Baneh	Baneh
Shahrdari Borujerd	Borujerd
Shahrdari Sahneh	Sahneh
Zobe-Felezat Bahar	Hamedan

=== Group 6 ===
Team	City
Bahman Shiraz	Shiraz
Jahan Foolad Isfahan	Isfahan
Jonoub Bagh-e-Malek	Bagh-e-Malek
Kargar Boneh Gez	Tangestan
Milad Dezful	Dezful
Naderi Bushehr	Bushehr
Persepolis Ganaveh	Ganaveh
Raad Padafand Kish	Kish
Sardaran Shahid Lordegan	Lordegan
Sepahan Yasuj	Yasuj
Shahrdari Neyriz	Neyriz
Shahrdari Noorabad Mamasani	Mamasani

== First Round (standings) ==
=== Group 1 ===
Pos	Team	Pld	W	D	L	GF	GA	GD	Pts	Qualification or relegation
1	Mes Soongoun Varzaghan	18	12	4	2	30	13	+17	40	Promotion to the Second Round
2	Naftoon Tehran	18	10	6	2	30	13	+17	36	Promotion to the Second Round
3	Shahrdari Fuman	18	9	5	4	33	12	+21	32	
4	Zoratkaran Parsabad	18	10	1	7	24	27	−3	31	
5	Azar Battery Orumieh	18	7	7	4	27	21	+6	28	Relegation play-off
6	Entezam Tehran	18	7	2	9	12	17	−5	23	Relegation play-off
7	Sherkate Khalkhal Dasht	18	4	7	7	21	19	+2	19	Relegation to the Provincial Leagues
8	Keyvan Mahabad	18	5	3	10	20	35	−15	18	Relegation to the Provincial Leagues
9	Mokerian Mahabad	18	2	5	11	16	44	−28	11	Relegation to the Provincial Leagues
10	Aluminium Hekmati Tabriz	18	2	4	12	15	27	−12	10	Relegation to the Provincial Leagues

Updated to match(es) played on 1 March 2012. Source:
Rules for classification: 1) points; 2) goal difference; 3) number of goals scored.

=== Group 2 ===
Pos	Team	Pld	W	D	L	GF	GA	GD	Pts	Qualification or relegation
1	Esteghlal Sari	22	15	5	2	42	12	+30	50	Promotion to the Second Round
2	Shahrdari Langarud	22	12	7	3	32	12	+20	43	Promotion to the Second Round
3	Shahrdari Chaboksar	22	10	5	7	39	24	+15	35	
4	Sepidrood Astaneh	22	9	8	5	28	17	+11	35	
5	Oghab Tehran	22	8	10	4	36	23	+13	34	Relegation play-off
6	Saba Novin Qom	22	8	9	5	35	28	+7	33	Relegation play-off
7	Alborz Shahdari Zanjan	22	10	3	9	41	35	+6	33	Relegation to the Provincial Leagues
8	Shahin Karaj	22	7	9	6	31	36	−5	30	Relegation to the Provincial Leagues
9	Shahrdari Astara	22	6	5	11	24	39	−15	23	Relegation to the Provincial Leagues
10	Talayedaran Buin-Zahra	22	4	5	13	20	38	−18	17	Relegation to the Provincial Leagues
11	Armin Qazvin	22	4	5	13	18	38	−20	17	Relegation to the Provincial Leagues
12	Shahin Tehran	22	1	5	16	18	62	−44	8	Relegation to the Provincial Leagues

Updated to match(es) played on 1 March 2012. Source:
Rules for classification: 1) points; 2) goal difference; 3) number of goals scored.

=== Group 3 ===
Pos	Team	Pld	W	D	L	GF	GA	GD	Pts	Qualification or relegation
1	Shahrdari Behshahr	20	11	5	4	34	18	+16	38	Promotion to the Second Round
2	Nima Chamestan	20	11	5	4	31	15	+16	38	Promotion to the Second Round
3	Esteghlal Jonub Tehran	20	10	7	3	33	19	+14	37	
4	Shahrdari Eslamshahr	20	9	8	3	27	17	+10	35	
5	Khazar Mahmoudabad	20	9	7	4	29	17	+12	34	Relegation play-off
6	Pars Football Chaloos	20	9	5	6	28	18	+10	32	Relegation play-off
7	Atrak Bojnourd	20	5	9	6	25	23	+2	24	Relegation to the Provincial Leagues
8	Etehad Pakdasht	20	5	7	8	27	37	−10	22	Relegation to the Provincial Leagues
9	Piroozi Garmsar	20	4	4	12	15	41	−26	16	Relegation to the Provincial Leagues
10	Kimia Aqqala	20	4	3	13	16	34	−18	15	Relegation to the Provincial Leagues
11	Sanaye Shazand	20	2	2	16	9	35	−26	8	Relegation to the Provincial Leagues

Updated to match(es) played on 3 March 2012. Source:
Rules for classification: 1) points; 2) goal difference; 3) number of goals scored.

=== Group 4 ===
Pos	Team	Pld	W	D	L	GF	GA	GD	Pts	Qualification or relegation
1	Dartak Khoramabad	22	13	7	2	44	19	+25	46	Promotion to the Second Round
2	Zobe-Felezat Bahar	22	14	1	7	37	23	+14	43	Promotion to the Second Round
3	Golchin Robat Karim	22	11	6	5	29	13	+16	39	
4	Shahrdari Sahneh	22	11	5	6	47	39	+8	38	
5	Shahrdari Borujerd	22	10	6	6	42	25	+17	36	Relegation play-off
6	Fajr Dehloran	22	10	4	8	28	25	+3	34	Relegation play-off
7	Mehr Arak	22	10	2	10	37	26	+11	32	Relegation to the Provincial Leagues
8	Minashi Eslamabad	22	9	5	8	39	39	0	32	Relegation to the Provincial Leagues
9	Shahrdari Baneh	22	9	3	10	31	34	−3	30	Relegation to the Provincial Leagues
10	Perspolis Darreh Shahr	22	6	5	11	23	38	−15	23	Relegation to the Provincial Leagues
11	Darayi Arak	22	4	2	16	18	46	−28	14	Relegation to the Provincial Leagues
12	Homa Javanroud	22	0	4	18	6	54	−48	4	Relegation to the Provincial Leagues

Updated to match(es) played on 3 March 2012. Source:
Rules for classification: 1) points; 2) goal difference; 3) number of goals scored.

=== Group 5 ===
Pos	Team	Pld	W	D	L	GF	GA	GD	Pts	Qualification or relegation
1	Sepahan Novin	22	11	11	0	45	20	+25	44	Promotion to the Second Round
2	Safahan Isfahan	22	12	7	3	34	15	+19	43	Promotion to the Second Round
3	Mes Novin Kerman	22	11	8	3	37	17	+20	41	
4	Fajr Khavaran Birjand	22	11	6	5	41	17	+24	39	
5	Mes Shahr-e Babak	22	9	7	6	38	26	+12	34	Relegation play-off
6	Anzan Izeh	22	9	5	8	27	27	0	32	Relegation play-off
7	Persepolis Shiraz	22	8	4	10	26	34	−8	28	Relegation to the Provincial Leagues
8	Shahrdari Ashkezar	22	7	6	9	27	28	−1	27	Relegation to the Provincial Leagues
9	Shahrdari Kahnuj	22	5	8	9	30	38	−8	23	Relegation to the Provincial Leagues
10	Mina Nakhl Minab	22	6	5	11	22	37	−15	23	Relegation to the Provincial Leagues
11	Mes Novin Rafsanjan	22	4	9	9	19	25	−6	21	Relegation to the Provincial Leagues
12	Saravan Sistan	22	0	2	20	3	65	−62	2	Relegation to the Provincial Leagues

Updated to match(es) played on 3 March 2011. Source:
Rules for classification: 1) points; 2) goal difference; 3) number of goals scored.

=== Group 6 ===
Pos	Team	Pld	W	D	L	GF	GA	GD	Pts	Qualification or relegation
1	Kargar Boneh Gaz	22	16	3	3	49	16	+33	51	Promotion to the Second Round
2	Persepolis Ganaveh	22	14	5	3	36	11	+25	47	Promotion to the Second Round
3	Bahman Shiraz	22	14	2	6	42	18	+24	44	
4	Shahrdari Neyriz	22	13	5	4	35	16	+19	44	
5	Naderi Bushehr	22	13	3	6	44	19	+25	42	Relegation play-off
6	Shahrdari Mamasani	22	12	4	6	36	16	+20	40	Relegation play-off
7	Jonoub Bagh-e-Malek	22	9	4	9	26	36	−10	31	Relegation to the Provincial Leagues
8	Sardaran Shahid Lordegan	22	7	5	10	32	46	−14	26	Relegation to the Provincial Leagues
9	Raad Padafand Kish	22	6	2	14	21	34	−13	20	Relegation to the Provincial Leagues
10	Milad Dezful	22	4	3	15	21	45	−24	15	Relegation to the Provincial Leagues
11	Jahan Foolad Isfahan	22	4	3	15	18	47	−29	15	Relegation to the Provincial Leagues
12	Sepahan Yasuj	22	0	1	21	14	70	−56	1	Relegation to the Provincial Leagues

Updated to match(es) played on 1 March 2012. Source:
Rules for classification: 1) points; 2) goal difference; 3) number of goals scored.

== Second Round (standings) ==
=== Group A ===
Pos	Team	Pld	W	D	L	GF	GA	GD	Pts	Promotion or qualification
1	Esteghlal Sari	10	7	1	2	19	14	+5	22	Promotion to the 2nd Division 2012–13
2	Shahrdari Langarud	10	3	5	2	9	6	+3	14	Promotion to the 2nd Division 2012–13
3	Mes Soongoun	10	3	4	3	11	12	−1	13	Promotion play-off
4	Nima Chamestan	10	2	5	3	10	11	−1	11	
5	Naftoon Tehran	10	3	2	5	10	13	−3	11	
6	Shahrdari Behshahr	10	1	5	4	10	13	−3	8	

Updated to match(es) played on 8 May 2012. Source:
Rules for classification: 1) points; 2) goal difference; 3) number of goals scored.

=== Group B ===
Pos	Team	Pld	W	D	L	GF	GA	GD	Pts	Promotion or qualification
1	Persepolis Ganaveh	10	6	2	2	19	10	+9	20	Promotion to the 2nd Division 2012–13
2	Dartak Khoramabad	10	5	3	2	16	11	+5	18	Promotion to the 2nd Division 2012–13
3	Safahan Isfahan	10	4	4	2	25	13	+12	16	Promotion play-off
4	Kargar Boneh Gaz	10	4	3	3	16	11	+5	15	
5	Sepahan Novin	10	3	4	3	15	15	0	13	
6	Zobe-Felezat Bahar	10	0	0	10	6	37	−31	0	

Updated to match(es) played on 8 May 2012. Source:
Rules for classification: 1) points; 2) goal difference; 3) number of goals scored.

== Final ==
=== Championship final ===
The single match to be played on 7 June 2012

Team 1	Score	Team 2	Notes
Persepolis Ganaveh	2–0	Esteghlal Sari	

=== Third place play-off ===
Team 1	Score	Team 2	Notes
Shahrdari Langarud	(w/o)	Dartak Khoramabad	

== Play-off ==
=== Promotion play-off ===
Team 1	Score	Team 2	1st leg	2nd leg	Notes
Safahan Isfahan	1–1	Mes Soongoun	1–0	0–1	Mes progress 3–1 on penalties

The winner will be promoted to 2012–13 Iran Football's 2nd Division.

=== Relegation play-off ===
Team 1	Agg.	Team 2	1st leg	2nd leg
Entezam Tehran	1–0	Oghab Tehran	1–0	0–0

Team 1	Agg.	Team 2	1st leg	2nd leg
Saba Novin Qom	2–2	Azar Battery Orumieh	2–1	0–1

Team 1	Agg.	Team 2	1st leg	2nd leg
Pars Football Chaloos	3–2	Shahrdari Borujerd	2–1	1–1

Team 1	Agg.	Team 2	1st leg	2nd leg
Fajr Dehloran	4–6	Khazar Mahmoudabad	1–1	3–5

Team 1	Agg.	Team 2	1st leg	2nd leg
Anzan Izeh	2–4	Naderi Bushehr	1–1	1–3

Team 1	Agg.	Team 2	1st leg	2nd leg
Shahrdari Mamasani	3–1	Mes Shahr-e Babak	0–1	3–0

The losers will be relegated to Provincial Leagues

== Player statistics ==
=== Top scorers ===
Rank	Scorer	Club	Goals
1	(Iran) Mohsen Derikvand	Dartak Khoramabad	19
2	(Iran) Farshid Elahi	Safahan Isfahan	18
3	(Iran) Mohsen Nakhaei	Mes Novin	16
3	(Iran) Alireza Daniali	Sepahan Novin	16
