= 2012–13 Iran 2nd Division =

Iran Football's 2nd Division
- Season: 2012–13
- Promoted: Naft & Gaz; Giti Pasand Isfahan; Siah Jamegan; Badr Hormozgan
- Relegated: Moghavemat; Choka; Dartak; Naft Mahmoudabad; Saipa Mehr; Seifabad Kazerun; Persepolis Varamin; Datis
- Matches: 364
- Goals: 820 (2.25 per match)

2012–13 Iran 2nd Division season is the edition of the third tier of the Iranian football league system annual 2nd Division football competition for the Persian Gulf Cup. after the Azadegan League.

The league is composed of 28 teams divided into two geographic divisions of 14 teams each. Teams contest other teams within their own division: once at home and once away for a total of 26 matches each.

In each division, the top two teams are promoted to Azadegan League, and the bottom two teams are relegated to Iran Football's 3rd Division plus the relegation playoff loser. In total, the league promotes 4 teams to Azadegan League and relegates 9 teams to 3rd Division.

The league started in September 2012.

== Teams ==
=== Stadia and locations ===
Locations of clubs in 2012–13 Persian Gulf Cup

=== Group A ===
Team	City
Badr Hormozgan	Bandar Lengeh
Caspian Qazvin	Qazvin
Choka Talesh	Talesh
Dartak Khoramabad	Khoramabad
Datis Lorestan	Khoramabad
Esteghlal Sari	Sari
Fajr Jam Bushehr	Bushehr
Foolad Novin	Ahvaz
Giti Pasand Isfahan	Isfahan
Saipa Mehr Karaj	Karaj
Mes Soongoun	Varzaghan
Minab Toyur Hormozgan	Minab
Moghavemat Tehran	Tehran
Naft & Gaz Gachsaran	Gachsaran

=== Stadia and locations ===
Locations of clubs in 2012–13 Persian Gulf Cup

=== Group B ===
Team	City
Naft Mahmoudabad	Mahmoudabad
Sanat Naft Novin	Abadan
Naft Omidiyeh	Omidiyeh
Persepolis Ganaveh	Ganaveh
Persepolis Varamin	Varamin
Siah Jamegan	Mashhad
Sanat Sari	Sari
Seifabad Kazerun	Kazerun
Sepidrood	Rasht
Shahrdari Ardebil	Ardabil
Shahrdari Dezful	Dezful
Shahrdari Langarud	Langarud
Shahrdari Noshahr	Noshahr
Steel Azin	Tehran

== Standings ==
=== Group A ===
Pos	Team	Pld	W	D	L	GF	GA	GD	Pts	Promotion or relegation
1	Naft va Gaz Gachsaran (P)	26	13	7	6	40	21	+19	46	Promotion to 2013–14 Azadegan League
2	Giti Pasand (P)	26	11	12	3	45	20	+25	45	Promotion to 2013–14 Azadegan League
3	Foolad Novin	26	12	8	6	34	15	+19	44	
4	Fajr Bushehr	26	12	8	6	32	24	+8	44	
5	Minab Toyur	26	12	7	7	31	25	+6	43	
6	Sh. Ardabil	26	10	11	5	37	19	+18	41	
7	Sanat Sari	26	11	7	8	37	27	+10	40	
8	Naft Omidiyeh	26	11	7	8	35	29	+6	40	
9	Sh. Langarud	26	9	9	8	19	20	−1	36	
10	Caspian Qazvin	26	9	8	9	31	23	+8	35	Relegation Play Off
11	Moghavemat Tehran (R)	26	8	7	11	26	31	−5	31	Relegation to 3rd Division 2013-2014
12	Chooka (R)	26	4	8	14	22	46	−24	20	Relegation to 3rd Division 2013-2014
13	Dartak (R)	26	4	6	16	15	52	−37	18	Relegation to 3rd Division 2013-2014
14	Naft Mahmoudabad (R)	26	1	5	20	12	64	−52	8	Relegation to 3rd Division 2013-2014

Updated to match(es) played on 17 April 2013. Source: Foolad FC
Rules for classification: 1) points; 2) goal difference; 3) number of goals scored.
(P) Promoted; (R) Relegated

=== Group B ===
Pos	Team	Pld	W	D	L	GF	GA	GD	Pts	Promotion or relegation
1	Siah Jamegan (P)	26	17	8	1	38	9	+29	59	Promotion to 2013–14 Azadegan League
2	Albadr Bandar Kong (P)	26	15	5	6	48	21	+27	50	Promotion to 2013–14 Azadegan League
3	Mes Soongoun	26	16	4	6	39	23	+16	46 (Note: Mes Soongoun were deducted 6 points.)	
4	Sepidrood	26	12	7	7	46	23	+23	43	
5	Sanat Naft Novin	26	10	9	7	31	23	+8	39	
6	Per. Ganaveh	26	10	8	8	27	25	+2	38	
7	Steel Azin	26	10	6	10	26	24	+2	36	
8	Sh. Noshahr	26	9	7	10	28	28	0	34	
9	Est. Sari	26	9	7	10	23	27	−4	34	
10	Sh. Dezful	26	9	5	12	25	30	−5	32	Relegation Play Off
11	Mehr Karaj (R)	26	9	5	12	20	33	−13	32	Relegation to 3rd Division 2013-2014
12	Seifabad Kazerun (R)	26	7	8	11	25	37	−12	29	Relegation to 3rd Division 2013-2014
13	Datis (R)	26	4	1	21	13	49	−36	13	Relegation to 3rd Division 2013-2014
14	Per. Varamin (R)	26	3	4	19	15	52	−37	13	Relegation to 3rd Division 2013-2014

Updated to match(es) played on 17 April 2013. Source: Foolad FC
Rules for classification: 1) points; 2) goal difference; 3) number of goals scored.
(P) Promoted; (R) Relegated

== Relegation play-off ==
Team 1	Agg.	Team 2	1st leg	2nd leg
Caspian Qazvin	?-?	Shahrdari Dezful	?–?	?–?

The loser will be relegated to 2013–14 Iran Football's 3rd Division.
