= Shahid Bahonar Stadium =

Multi-purpose stadium in central Kerman, Iran

- Kerman Municipal Stadium; Kerman Stadium
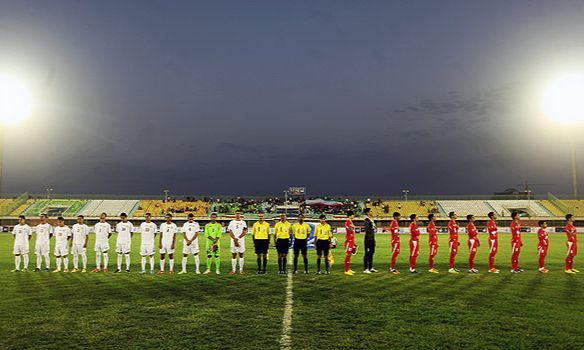
- Interactive map of Shahid Bahonar Stadium
- Full name: Shahid Bahonar Kerman Stadium
- Location: Kerman, Iran
- Coordinates: 30.270857°N 56.986629°E
- Owner: Sanat Mes Kerman FC
- Operator: Development and Maintenance of Sports Facilities
- Capacity: 15,430
- Surface: Desso GrassMaster
- Record attendance: 14,855 (Mes Kerman vs Tractor Sazi, 14 February 2014)
- Field size: 105 m × 68 m (344 ft × 223 ft)

Construction
- Built: 2004–2007 (3 years)
- Opened: 1 December 2007
- Cost: 6,000,000,000 tomans (€2,401,249)
- Architect: Ahmad Namdar

Tenant
- Mes Kerman (2007–present)

Website
- www.emamalisportcomplex.com

Shahid Bahonar Kerman Stadium (Persian: استاديوم شهید باهنر کرمان) is a multi-purpose stadium, located in central Kerman, Iran. It is used mostly for football matches. The stadium is able to hold 15,430 people and was opened in 2007. Shahid Bahonar Stadium is the home venue of Azadegan League side, Mes Kerman Athletic and Cultural Club.

== History ==
Mes Kerman announced in November 2003 that it has plans to build its own football stadium with a 45,000 capacity (later it was reduced to 15,430 by Kerman's Municipality) to be replaced with Salimikia Stadium. The building progress of the stadium was officially started on 13 July 2004 and ended on 12 March 2007 with the stadium officially opened on 1 December 2007.

== Building ==
The stadium is located on a site with an area of 54 acres.

== Events ==
The stadium hosted 2014 AFC U-19 Championship qualification Group D's matches which was included Iran, Saudi Arabia, Lebanon and Tajikistan. Iran qualified for the final round as group's winner. The final match of 2013–14 Hazfi Cup was also hosted by the Shahid Bahonar Stadium.

Date	Team #1	Res.	Team #2
2013–10–08	Iran	2–0	Tajikistan
2013–10–10	Iran	6–1	Lebanon
2013–10–12	Iran	1–0	Saudi Arabia

=== Inauguration match ===
The opening ceremony of the stadium was held on 1 December 2007 but the first match held in the stadium was an Iran Pro League match against Pas Hamedan on 22 January 2008.

22 January 2008
18:00 UTC+4:30

Mes Kerman	2 – 0	Pas Hamedan
Zaltron 44', 48'

Shahid Bahonar Stadium, Kerman
Attendance: 11,000
Referee: Amir Bakhshizadeh

Mes Kerman (4-4-2):
GK	1	(Iran) Mehdi Rahmati
DF	2	(Iran) Jalal Omidian
DF	5	(Mali) Sékou Fofana
DF	6	(Iran) Morteza Ebhrahimi
DF	13	(Iran) Rasoul Mirtoroghi
MF	8	(Iran) Farzad Hosseinkhani (c)
MF	10	(Iran) Ali Molaei (substituted off) 46'
MF	15	(Iran) Majid Khodabandelo (substituted off) 67'
MF	23	(Iran) Yasha Khalili
FW	11	(Brazil) Zaltron (substituted off) 88'
FW	19	(Uruguay) Karibito
Substitutions:
MF	18	(Iran) Rasoul Navidkia	(substituted on) 67'
FW	27	(Nigeria) Uche Ehroomi	(substituted on) 88'
FW	29	(Brazil) Edinho	(substituted on) 46'
Manager:
(Iran) Amir Ghalenoei

Pas Hamedan (3-5-2):
GK	22	(Croatia) Sandro Tomić
DF	5	(Iran) Hanif Omranzadeh (substituted off) 59'
DF	7	(Iran) Khosro Heydari (substituted off) 89'
DF	13	(Iran) Javad Shirzad
MF	6	(Iran) Omid Khouraj (yellow card)
MF	8	(Iran) Mostafa Chatrabgoon
MF	10	(Iran) Yadollah Akbari (c) (substituted off) 57'
MF	15	(Iran) Mohammad Alavi
MF	18	(Bosnia and Herzegovina) Faruk Ihtijarević
FW	17	(Bosnia and Herzegovina) Emir Obuća
FW	29	(Iran) Saeed Daghighi
Substitutions:
MF	14	(Iran) Ali Amiri	(substituted on) 89'
MF	20	(Iran) Mohsen Mirabi	(substituted on) 59'
FW	29	(Iran) Mohammad Gholami	(substituted on) 57'
Manager:
(Croatia) Vinko Begović
