= Arman Shahdadnejad =

Iranian footballer

Personal information
- Date of birth: 19 February 1989 (age 37)
- Place of birth: Jiroft, Iran
- Height: 1.86 m (6 ft 1 in)
- Position: Goalkeeper

Youth career
- Keshavarz Jiroft
- 2004–2009: Mes Kerman

Senior career*
Years	Team	Apps	(Gls)
2008–2017	Mes Kerman	69	(0)
2009–2010	→ Bandar Abbas (loan)	17	(0)
2015–2016	→ Nirooye Zamini (loan)		
2017–2018	Gol Gohar	6	(0)
2018	Bargh Jadid	1	(0)
2018–2019	Mes Kerman	15	(0)
2019–2020	Malavan	1	(0)
2020	Havadar	3	(0)
2020–2021	Mes Novin Kerman		
2021–2023	Mes Kerman	46	(0)
2024–	Sepahan B		
- * Club domestic league appearances and goals as of 3 November 2013

Arman Shahdadnejad (Persian: آرمان شهدادنژاد; born 19 February 1989) is an Iranian football goalkeeper who plays for Sepahan B in the League 2.

== Club career ==
=== Mes Kerman ===
Shahdadnejad started his career with Mes Kerman.

=== Club career statistics ===
As of 10 May 2014

Club	Division	Season	League		Hazfi Cup		Asia		Total	
Club	Division	Season	Apps	Goals	Apps	Goals	Apps	Goals	Apps	Goals
Mes Kerman	Pro League	2008–09	0	0		0	–	–		0
Shahrdari Bandar Abbas	Division 1	2009–10	17	0		0	–	–		0
Mes Kerman	Pro League	2010–11	1	0		0	–	–		0
Mes Kerman	Pro League	2011–12	5	0		0	–	–		0
Mes Kerman	Pro League	2012–13	23	0		0	–	–		0
Mes Kerman	Pro League	2013–14	16	0		0	–	–		0
Career Total			63	0		0	0	0		0
