= 2013–14 Iran 2nd Division =

Iran Football's 2nd Division
- Season: 2013–14
- Champions: Shahrdari Ardabil (A) and Etka Gorgan (B)
- Promoted: Shahrdari Ardabil; Etka Gorgan; Foolad Novin; Shahrdari Tabriz
- Relegated: Shahin Bushehr; Bargh Shiraz; Hoordad Rayan; Sepidrood Rasht; Shahrdari Arak; Minab Toyur Hormozgan; Payam Sanat Amol
- Matches: 338
- Goals: 731 (2.16 per match)

2013–14 Iran 2nd Division is the edition of the third tier of the Iranian football league system 2nd Division football competitive season for the Persian Gulf Cup.

The league is composed of 28 teams divided into two geographic divisions of 14 teams each. Teams contest only other teams in their own division: once at home and once away for a total of 26 matches each.

In each division, two teams are promoted to Azadegan League, and three teams are relegated to Iran Football's 3rd Division plus the relegation playoff loser. In total, the league promotes 4 teams to Azadegan League and relegates 7 teams to 3rd Division.

The League began in September 2013.

== Teams ==
=== Group A ===
Team	City
Bargh Shiraz	Shiraz
Shahrdari Jooybar	Jooybar
Shahin Bushehr	Bushehr
Machine Sazi	Tabriz
Mes Soongoun	Varzaghan
Kargar Boneh Gaz Bushehr	Bushehr
Khalkhal Dasht	Khalkhal
Foolad Novin	Ahvaz
Sanat Naft Novin	Abadan
Sanat Sari	Sari
Hoordad Rayan	Kerman
Shahrdari Ardebil	Ardabil
Shahrdari Dezful	Dezful
Shahrdari Langarud	Langarud

=== Group B ===
Team	City
Caspian Qazvin	Qazvin
Minab Toyur Hormozgan	Minab
Payam Sanat Amol F.C.	Amol
Bahman Shiraz F.C.	Shiraz
Etka	Gorgan
Shahrdari Arak	Arak
Melli Haffari	Ahvaz
Shahrdari Tabriz	Tabriz
Fajr Jam Bushehr	Bushehr
Karun Khuzestan	Ahvaz
Naft Omidiyeh	Omidiyeh
Persepolis Ganaveh	Ganaveh
Sepidrood	Rasht
Shahrdari Noshahr	Noshahr

== Standings ==
=== Group A ===
Pos	Team	Pld	W	D	L	GF	GA	GD	Pts	Promotion or relegation
1	Sh. Ardabil (P)	24	14	7	3	35	18	+17	49	Promotion to Azadegan League 2014–15
2	Foolad Novin (P)	24	13	7	4	35	17	+18	46	Promotion to Azadegan League 2014–15
3	Mes Soongoun	24	10	8	6	43	29	+14	38	
3	Sanat Naft Novin	24	11	5	8	32	24	+8	38	
5	Sanat Sari	24	9	9	6	32	25	+7	36	
6	Sh. Jooybar	24	9	8	7	30	23	+7	35	
7	Khalkhal Dasht	24	8	10	6	22	18	+4	34	
8	Kargar Boneh Gaz	24	8	7	9	27	34	−7	31	
9	Sh. Dezful Novin	24	6	9	9	27	29	−2	27	
10	Sh. Langarud	24	5	9	10	32	42	−10	24	
11	Machine Sazi	24	6	5	13	26	33	−7	23	Qualification to relegation play-offs
12	Bargh Shiraz (R)	24	5	8	11	13	21	−8	23	Relegation to 3rd Division 2014–15
13	Hoordad Rayan (R)	24	3	7	14	14	51	−37	16	Relegation to 3rd Division 2014–15
14	Shahin Bushehr (R)	0	0	0	0	0	0	0	0	Relegation to 3rd Division 2014–15

Updated to match(es) played on 20 August 2013. Source: http://www.dsport.ir/fa/posts/76
Rules for classification: 1) points; 2) goal difference; 3) number of goals scored.
(P) Promoted; (R) Relegated

=== Group B ===
Pos	Team	Pld	W	D	L	GF	GA	GD	Pts	Promotion or relegation
1	Etka Gorgan (P)	26	17	3	6	36	11	+25	54	Promotion to Azadegan League 2014–15
2	Sh. Tabriz (P)	26	16	4	6	34	14	+20	52	Promotion to Azadegan League 2014–15
3	Hafari Ahvaz	26	14	7	5	34	19	+15	49	
4	Naft Omidiyeh	26	13	7	6	25	17	+8	46	
5	Bahman Shiraz	26	12	8	6	26	15	+11	44	
6	Caspian Qazvin	26	11	8	7	30	16	+14	41	
7	Fajr Jam	26	11	5	10	29	24	+5	38	
8	Payam Vahdat Khorasan	26	10	6	10	30	25	+5	36	
9	Karun Khuzestan	26	6	16	4	28	22	+6	34	
10	Per. Ganaveh	26	7	8	11	22	31	−9	29	
11	Payam Amol (R)	26	7	7	12	19	27	−8	28	Qualification to relegation play-offs
12	Sepidrood (R)	26	5	9	12	27	39	−12	24	Relegation to 3rd Division 2014–15
13	Sh. Arak (R)	26	3	9	14	17	37	−20	18	Relegation to 3rd Division 2014–15
14	Minab Toyur (R)	26	1	2	23	6	64	−58	5	Relegation to 3rd Division 2014–15

Updated to match(es) played on 25 November 2013. Source:
Rules for classification: 1) points; 2) goal difference; 3) number of goals scored.
(P) Promoted; (R) Relegated

== Relegation play-off ==
Team 1	Agg.	Team 2	1st leg	2nd leg
Machine Sazi	6-0	Payam Sanat Amol	3–0	3–0

Payam Sanat Amol relegated to 2014–15 Iran Football's 3rd Division.
