= Abbas Sarkhab =

Iranian footballer and manager

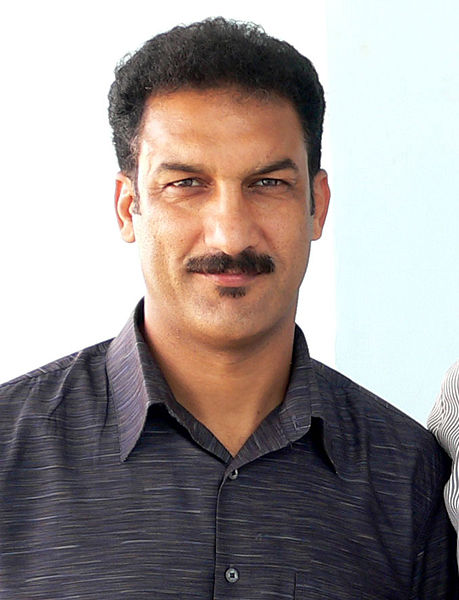

Personal information
- Full name: Abbas Sarkhab
- Date of birth: 21 March 1970 (age 56)
- Place of birth: Minab, Iran
- Position: Forward

Team information
- Current team: Jaalan club (manager)

Youth career
- 1986–1987: Niroye Zamini

Senior career*
Years	Team	Apps	(Gls)
1987–1988	Niroye Zamini		
1988–1995	Esteghlal		
1995–1996	BEC Tero Sasana		
1996–1998	Fajr Sepasi		

International career
1986–1990	Iran		

Managerial career
- 2009–2012: Aluminium
- 2012–3013: Shahrdari Bandar Abbas
- 2013–2015: Kargar Boneh Gaz
- 2015–2017: Aluminium
- 2017–2018: PAS Hamedan
- 2018–: Jaalan club
- * Club domestic league appearances and goals

Abbas Sarkhab (Persian: عباس سرخاب, born 21 March 1970) is an Iranian retired football player and coach who currently manages Kargar Boneh Gaz in the Iranian Second Division. He played for Esteghlal in the 1990s.

== Managerial statistics ==
As of November 2, 2013

Team	From	To	Record							
Team	From	To	G	W	D	L	Win %	GF	GA	+/-
Shahrdari Bandar Abbas	June 2009	May 2010	27	10	9	8	37.04	36	25	+11
Shahrdari Bandar Abbas	December 2012	December 2012	3	2	1	0	66.67	5	1	+4
Aluminium	September 2013	November 2013	8	1	3	4	12.50	6	9	–3
Total			38	13	13	12	34.21	47	35	+12

== Honours ==
Esteghlal

- AFC Champions League: 1990–91, 1991–92 (Runner-up)
- Iran Pro League: 1989–90, 1991–92 (Runner-up), 1994–95 (Runner-up)
- Hazfi Cup: 1989–90 (Runner-up)
