= Adib Zarei =

Iranian association football player

Personal information
- Full name: Adib Zarei
- Date of birth: 16 April 2003 (age 23)
- Place of birth: Bushehr, Iran
- Height: 1.88 m (6 ft 2 in)
- Position: Goalkeeper

Team information
- Current team: Shams Azar (on loan from Tractor)
- Number: 49

Youth career
- Shahin

Senior career*
Years	Team	Apps	(Gls)
2023–	Tractor	2	(0)
2024–2025	→ Foolad (loan)	1	(0)
2026–	→ Shams Azar (loan)	10	(0)

International career
2023	Iran U-20		
- * Club domestic league appearances and goals as of 5 September 2026

Adib Zarei (Persian: ادیب زارعی; born 16 April 2003) is an Iranian professional footballer who plays as a goalkeeper for Shams Azar in the Persian Gulf Pro League, on loan from Tractor.

== Club career ==
=== Tractor ===
In July 2023, Zarei joined Tractor and wore the number 49 shirt for the club.

=== Foolad ===
In August 2024, Zarei joined Foolad on a one-year loan deal.

During a Hazfi Cup match in which Foolad hosted Foolad Hormozgan, after the two teams drew in regulation and extra time, Zarei saved five penalties in the penalty shoot-out, emerging as a revelation for Foolad.

=== Shams Azar ===
In August 2026, Zarei signed a one-year loan deal with Shams Azar, joining from Tractor.

== International career ==
Zarei has represented the Iran U-20 national team.

== Career statistics ==
As of 5 September 2026

Club	Division	Season	League		Hazfi Cup		Asia		Total	
Club	Division	Season	Apps	Goals	Apps	Goals	Apps	Goals	Apps	Goals
Tractor	Persian Gulf Pro League	2023–24	1	0	0	0	–	–	1	0
Foolad (loan)	Persian Gulf Pro League	2024–25	3	0	0	0	–	–	3	0
Shams Azar (loan)	Persian Gulf Pro League	2026–27	4	0	0	0	–	–	4	0
Career total			8	0	0	0	–	–	8	0
