= Naderi Bushehr F.C. =

Iranian football club

Naderi Bushehr Football Club is an Iranian football club based in Bushehr, Iran. They currently compete in the 2011–12 Iran Football's 3rd Division.

== Season-by-Season ==
The table below shows the achievements of the club in various competitions.

| Season | League | Position | Hazfi Cup | Notes |
|---|---|---|---|---|
| 2009–10 | Bushehr Provincial League | 1st |
| 2010–11 | Bushehr Provincial League | | 2nd Round |
| 2011–12 | 3rd Division |

== See also ==
- Hazfi Cup
- Iran Football's 3rd Division 2011–12
