= Hossein Charkhabi =

Iranian football coach

Personal information
- Full name: Hossein Charkhabi
- Date of birth: September 23, 1950 (age 76)
- Place of birth: Isfahan, Iran

Senior career*
Years	Team	Apps	(Gls)
1970s	Daraei Isfahan		

Managerial career
- 1979–1992: Tam
- Zob Ahan
- 1995–1997: Polyacryl
- Sepahan U–23
- 2003–2008: Sepahan Novin
- 2008: Sepahan
- 2010: Sepahan Novin
- 2010–2011: Foulad Natanz
- 2011: Giti Pasand
- * Club domestic league appearances and goals

Hossein Charkhabi (Persian: حسین چرخابی; born September 23, 1950) is an Iranian football coach.
