= Saba Novin Qom F.C. =

Iranian football club

Saba Novin Qom
- Full name: Saba Novin Qom Football Club
- Founded: 2011; 6 years ago
- Ground: Takhti Stadium, Qom
- Capacity: 2,000 (1,350 seated)
- Chairman: Mojtaba Ramezan Beygi
- Head Coach: Abbas Rahmani
- League: 3rd Division
- Website: http://www.sabayeqom.ir/

Saba Novin Qom Football Club is an Iranian football club based in Qom, Iran. They currently compete in Qom's Provincial League.

== Season-by-Season ==
The table below shows the achievements of the club in various competitions.

Season	League	Position	Hazfi Cup	Notes
2011–12	3rd Division

=== First-team squad ===
Note: Flags indicate national team as defined under FIFA eligibility rules; some limited exceptions apply. Players may hold more than one non-FIFA nationality.

No.	Pos.	Nation	Player
—	GK	IRI	Hossein Ebadi
—		IRI	Hamed Amani
—		IRI	Hassan Aghaziarati
—		IRI	Javad Fallah
—		IRI	Ali Bakhtiarizadeh
—		IRI	Mohammad Molaei
—	MF	IRI	Sajjad Oveysi
—		IRI	Amir Mollajamali
—	FW	IRI	Masoud Khosravi
—		IRI	Mohammad Behzadpour
—		IRI	Mohammad Ghorbani
—	FW	IRI	Younes Azizi

No.	Pos.	Nation	Player
10	FW	IRI	Alireza Ostovari (Captain)
—	FW	IRI	Mohammad Rasouli
—		IRI	Ali Mirhashemi
—		IRI	Mohammad Saeedkhani
—		IRI	Mojtaba Kan'ani
—		IRI	Ali Yavari
—	GK	IRI	Seyed Hassan Masoumi
—	FW	IRI	Hamid Reza Pakizeh
—		IRI	Mehdi Aghaei
—		IRI	Milad Abadi
—	GK	IRI	Ali Mahdavi
—	GK	IRI	Hamid Reza Nazifi

== See also ==
- Hazfi Cup
- Iran Football's 3rd Division 2011–12
- Saba Qom Futsal Club
- Saba Qom Football Club
