= Yaran Ghadir Alborz F.C. =

Iranian football club

Yaran Ghadir Alborz Football Club Persian: باشگاه فوتبال یاران غدیر البرز
- Ground: Hashtgerd, Iran

Yaran Ghadir Alborz Football Club (Persian: باشگاه فوتبال یاران غدیر البرز) is an Iranian association football team based in Hashtgerd, Iran.
