= Mostafa Shojaei =

Iranian footballer

Personal information
- Date of birth: 27 March 1983 (age 43)
- Place of birth: Kerman, Iran
- Position: Striker

Youth career
- Sepahan

Senior career*
Years	Team	Apps	(Gls)
2005–2010	Sepahan Novin		
2010–2011	Foolad Natanz	22	(13)
2011–2014	Mes Kerman	57	(22)
2014	Zob Ahan	12	(1)
2015	Paykan	8	(2)
2015–2016	Mes Kerman	15	(1)
2016	Giti Pasand	6	(1)
- * Club domestic league appearances and goals

Mostafa Shojaei (Persian: مصطفی شجاعی; born 27 March 1983) is an Iranian former footballer who played as a forward.

== Career ==
Shojaei started his career with Sepahan at youth level. After spending four years in Division 1, in 2011 he joined Mes Kerman, in the Azadegan League, which is the second highest division of professional football in Iran.

=== Club career statistics ===
As of 22 December 2014

Club performance			League		Cup		Continental		Total	
Season	Club	League	Apps	Goals	Apps	Goals	Apps	Goals	Apps	Goals
Iran			League		Hazfi Cup		Asia		Total	
2007–08	Sepahan Novin	Division 1	22	4	1	0	–		23	4
2008–09	Sepahan Novin	Division 1	22	11	3	3	–		27	14
2009–10	Sepahan Novin	Division 1	19	17	3	3	–		22	20
2010–11	Foolad Natanz	Division 1	22	13	4	1	–		26	5
2011–12	Mes Kerman	Pro League	11	4	0	0	–		7	4
2012–13	Mes Kerman	Pro League	23	14	0	0	–		23	14
2013–14	Mes Kerman	Pro League	24	3	5	3	–		29	6
2014–15	Zob Ahan	Pro League	12	1	1	0	–		13	1
2014–15	Paykan	Pro League	0	0	0	0	–		0	0
Career total			155	67	17	10	0	0	172	77
