= Dartak Khoramabad F.C. =

Iranian football club

- Full name: Dartak Khoramabad Football Club

Dartak Khoramabad Football Club is an Iranian football club based in Khoramabad, Iran. They currently compete in the 2011–12 Iran Football's 3rd Division.

== Season-by-Season ==
The table below shows the achievements of the club in various competitions.

Season	League	Position	Hazfi Cup	Notes
2009–10	Lorestan Provincial League	1st
2010–11	3rd Division	4th/Group 4	2nd Round
2011–12	3rd Division

== See also ==
- Hazfi Cup
- Iran Football's 3rd Division 2011–12
