= Sanat Sari F.C. =

Iranian football club

- Full name: Sanat Sari Football Club
- Short name: Sanat Sari
- Founded: 2010; 7 years ago
- Ground: Shohada Stadium; Sari; Iran
- Head Coach: (Iran) Behzad Dadashzadeh
- League: 2nd Division
- 2014–15: 2nd Division Group A, 4th
Home colours

Sanat Sari Football Club is an Iranian football club based in Sari, Iran. They currently compete in the 2nd Division.

== History ==
The club was formed out of the ensuring battle to relocate Mehrkam Pars Tehran after the club ran into financial difficulties. After initial reports that the club had been bought by the city of Urmia, the club mysteriously moved to Sari a few days later.

== Season by season ==
The table below chronicles the achievements of the Club in various competitions.

| Season | League | Position | Hazfi Cup |
|---|---|---|---|
| 2010–11 | Azadegan League | 7th | 2nd Round |
| 2011–12 | Azadegan League | 13th | Second Round |
| 2012–13 | 2nd Division | 7th | Didn't Enter |
| 2013–14 | 2nd Division | 4th | Fourth Round |
| 2014–15 | 2nd Division | 5th | 1/4 Final |
| 2015–16 | 2nd Division | 9th |

== First Team Squad ==
As of March 4, 2012 Note: Flags indicate national team as defined under FIFA eligibility rules; some limited exceptions apply. Players may hold more than one non-FIFA nationality.

| No. | Pos. | Nation | Player |
|---|---|---|---|
| 1 | GK | IRN | Ayat Mirzajanpour |
| 2 | DF | IRN | Ahad Shafiei |
| 3 | DF | IRN | Mehdi Sadati |
| 4 | DF | IRN | Samad Masihzade |
| 5 | DF | IRN | Hamid Faraji |
| 6 | DF | IRN | Morteza Malakkheili |
| 7 | MF | IRN | Mehdi Fooladi |
| 8 | MF | IRN | Amir Mohsen Rouzbayani |
| 9 | FW | IRN | Mohammad Najafi |
| 10 | FW | IRN | Amir Zoleikani |
| 11 | FW | IRN | Mostafa Karimi |
| 12 | GK | IRN | Mohammad Sayyahi |

| No. | Pos. | Nation | Player |
|---|---|---|---|
| 13 | DF | IRN | Mehdi Dastaaran |
| 14 | MF | IRN | Keyvan Hashemi |
| 15 | FW | IRN | Adel Ramzani |
| 16 | DF | IRN | Mohammad Ghasemi |
| 17 | MF | IRN | Ehsan Ahangary |
| 18 | MF | IRN | Amir Farhangdoost |
| 19 | MF | IRN | Sina Kiri Saidifar |
| 20 | MF | IRN | Vahid Khazani |
| 21 | MF | IRN | Farzad Zayer |
| 23 | MF | IRN | Nima Hadian |
| 31 | FW | IRN | Vahid Enayati |
