= Payam Sanat Amol F.C. =

Iranian football club

- Full name: Payam Sanat Kachila Amol Club باشگاه فوتبال پیام صنعت آمل کاچیلا
- Nickname: Payam Sanat – پیام صنعت
- Founded: 2011
- Ground: Workers Ejbar Kola
- Capacity: 1000
- Owner: Group Sanat Amol – Kachila Company
- Chairman: Jafar Hendouei
- Manager: Jamshid Ghadiri
- League: 2nd Division
- 2012–13: 5th
Home colours	Away colours	Third colours

Payam Sanat Amol Football Club (Kachila) is an Iranian football club based in Amol, Iran.

== History ==
Payam Sanat won the 3rd Division in 2013 and was promoted to the 2013–2014 2nd Division season.

== Season-by-Season ==
The table below shows the achievements of the club in various competitions.

Season	League	Position	Hazfi Cup	Notes
2012–13	3rd Division	1st		Promoted
2013–14	2nd Division

== Club managers ==
- (Iran) Hossein Vali Nejad (2011–2013)
- (Iran) Rahman Rezaei (2013–2013)
- (Iran) Behrouz Valipour (2013–2013)
- (Iran) Jamshid Ghadiri (2013–)

== Achievements ==
- Winner (1) 2012–13 Iran Football's 3rd Division

== See also ==
- Football in Iran
- (in Persian) Official Web Site
