= Esteghlal Sari F.C. =

Iranian football club

Esteghlal Sari
- Full name: Esteghlal Sari Football Club
- Founded: 2003; 14 years ago
- Ground: Shohada Sari Stadium; Sari, Iran
- Head Coach: Shobeyr Lotfi
- League: 2nd Division
- 2011–12: 1st / Group A
- Website: http://www.esteghlalesari.com/

Esteghlal Sari Football Club is an Iranian football club based in Sari, Iran.

== Season-by-Season ==
The table below shows the achievements of the club in various competitions.

Season	League	Position	Hazfi Cup	Notes
2011–12	3rd Division	1st/Group A		Promoted
2012–13	2nd Division

== See also ==
- Hazfi Cup
- Iran Football's 2nd Division 2012–13
