= Saeid Daghighi =

Iranian football player and politician

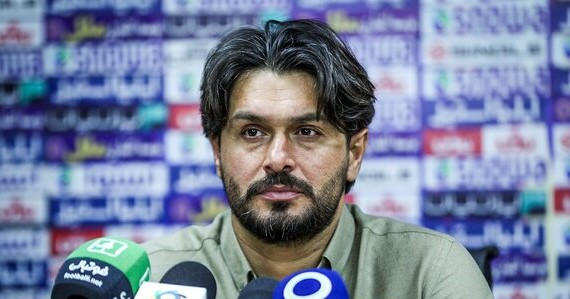
- Saeid Daghighi with Shams Azar in 2023

Personal information
- Full name: Saeid Daghighi Masouleh
- Date of birth: March 31, 1985 (age 41)
- Place of birth: Qazvin, Iran
- Position: Forward

Team information
- Current team: Nassaji Mazandaran (manager)

Senior career*
Years	Team	Apps	(Gls)
2004–2007	Saba Battery	56	(8)
2007–2008	Pas Hamedan	15	(0)
2008–2009	Shahrdari Tabriz	20	(8)
2009–2010	Paykan	34	(6)
2010–2012	Shahrdari Tabriz	63	(24)
2012–2013	Saipa	24	(11)
2013–2014	Tractor	24	(5)
2014–2015	Paykan	25	(5)
2015	Gostaresh	9	(2)
2015–2016	Mes Kerman	13	(7)
2016	Machine Sazi	4	(0)
Total		287	(76)

International career
2005–2006	Iran U23		
2011–2012	Iran	2	(1)

Managerial career
- 2017–2018: Caspian Qazvin (Player-Coach)
- 2021–2022: Paykan
- 2022–2024: Shams Azar
- 2024: Malavan
- 2024: Shams Azar
- 2024–2025: Kheybar Khorramabad
- 2025–2026: Paykan
- 2026–: Nassaji Mazandaran
- * Club domestic league appearances and goals

Saeid Daghighi (born March 31, 1985) is a former Iranian football player and current manager of Paykan. As a player, he was banned for six months for doping in 2008.

== Doping ban ==
In 2008, Daghighi was given a 6-month ban from football along with teammate Faruk Ihtijarević for testing positive for performance-enhancing substances.

== Political career ==
In 2017, he was elected to Qazvin City Council.

== Club career ==
=== Club career statistics ===
Club performance			League		Cup		Continental		Total	
Season	Club	League	Apps	Goals	Apps	Goals	Apps	Goals	Apps	Goals
Iran			League		Hazfi Cup		Asia		Total	
2004–05	Saba	Pro League	19	5			-	-		
2005–06	Saba	Pro League	22	3				0		
2006–07	Saba	Pro League	15	0			-	-		
2007–08	Pas	Pro League	15	0	2	1	-	-	17	1
2008–09	Shahrdari Tabriz	Division 1	20	8			-	-		
2009–10	Paykan	Pro League	34	6			-	-		
2010–11	Shahrdari Tabriz	Pro League	30	14	2	3	-	-	32	17
2011–12	Shahrdari Tabriz	Pro League	33	10	1	0	-	-	34	10
2012–13	Saipa	Pro League	24	11	1	0	-	-	25	11
2013–14	Tractor	Pro League	18	6	4	3	4	1	26	10
2014–15	Paykan	Pro League	18	4	2	0	0	0	20	4
Career total			230	58				1		

- Assist Goals

Season	Team	Assists
10–11	Shahrdari Tabriz	3
11–12	Shahrdari Tabriz	8
12–13	Saipa	2
13–14	Tractor	3
14–15	Paykan	0

== International career ==
He was invited to national football team on 1 July 2011 by Carlos Queiroz. He made his debut in a friendly match against Madagascar.

=== International goals ===
#	Date	Venue	Opponent	Score	Result	Competition
1.	23 July 2011	Azadi Stadium, Tehran	Maldives	4-0	4-0	2014 FIFA World Cup qualification

== Honours ==
=== Player ===
Saba

- Hazfi Cup (1): 2004–05

Tractor

- Hazfi Cup (1): 2013–14

=== Manager ===
Shams Azar

- Azadegan League
  - Winners (1): 2022–23
