= 2014–15 Iran Football's 3rd Division =

Iran Football's 3rd Division
- Season: 2014–15
- Promoted: Moghavemat Tehran; Kara Shiraz; Shahrdari Mahshahr; Rahpouyan Rezvanshahr

The article contains information about the 2014–15 Iran 3rd Division football season. This is the 4th rated football league in Iran after the Persian Gulf Cup, Azadegan League, and 2nd Division. The league started from September 2014.

In total and in the first round, 53 teams will compete in 5 different groups.

== First round ==
=== Group A ===
Pos	Team	Pld	W	D	L	GF	GA	GD	Pts	Qualification or relegation
1	Emarat Gorgan	11	8	1	2	19	10	+9	25	Promotion to Second round
2	Darya Babol	11	8	0	3	19	6	+13	24	Promotion to Second round
3	Aramesh Mashhad	11	7	2	2	16	7	+9	23	
4	Est. Jonub	11	6	2	3	15	9	+6	20	
5	Shahid Karimi Jooybar	11	5	4	2	11	7	+4	19	Relegation to Provincial Leagues 2015–16
6	Pars Ideh Gorgan	11	5	3	3	10	7	+3	18	Relegation to Provincial Leagues 2015–16
7	Sh. Tonekabon	11	5	1	5	11	7	+4	16	Relegation to Provincial Leagues 2015–16
8	Sadra Neka	11	4	3	4	17	11	+6	15	Relegation to Provincial Leagues 2015–16
9	Fartak Tehran	11	3	2	6	10	20	−10	11	Relegation to Provincial Leagues 2015–16
10	Sarina Bojnurd	11	2	2	7	7	20	−13	8	Relegation to Provincial Leagues 2015–16
11	Naft Mahmoudabad	11	1	4	6	5	11	−6	7	Relegation to Provincial Leagues 2015–16
12	Yaran Dokouh	11	0	0	11	3	28	−25	0	Relegation to Provincial Leagues 2015–16

Updated to match(es) played on 15 December 2015. Source:
Rules for classification: 1) points; 2) goal difference; 3) number of goals scored.

=== Group B ===
Pos	Team	Pld	W	D	L	GF	GA	GD	Pts	Qualification or relegation
1	Sh. Fuman	10	7	3	0	21	3	+18	24	Promotion to Second round
2	Mahya Savadkuh	10	7	1	2	14	6	+8	22	Promotion to Second round
3	Est. Qaemshahr	10	6	2	2	15	11	+4	20	
4	Parsian Tehran	10	5	3	2	15	7	+8	18	
5	Pars Gostar	10	5	0	5	17	15	+2	15	Relegation to Provincial Leagues 2015–16
6	Sh. Behshahr	10	4	2	4	15	10	+5	14	Relegation to Provincial Leagues 2015–16
7	Shohada N.H	10	3	4	3	10	10	0	13	Relegation to Provincial Leagues 2015–16
8	Est. Novin Qazvin	10	3	2	5	12	18	−6	11	Relegation to Provincial Leagues 2015–16
9	Farid Karaj	10	3	0	7	13	14	−1	9	Relegation to Provincial Leagues 2015–16
10	Asto Qazvin	10	2	2	6	8	22	−14	8	Relegation to Provincial Leagues 2015–16
11	Abadgaran Qom	10	0	1	9	4	28	−24	1	Relegation to Provincial Leagues 2015–16

Updated to match(es) played on 15 December 2014. Source:
Rules for classification: 1) points; 2) goal difference; 3) number of goals scored.

=== Group C ===
Pos	Team	Pld	W	D	L	GF	GA	GD	Pts	Qualification or relegation
1	Irandad Tehran	10	7	2	1	18	6	+12	23	Promotion to Second round
2	Ostandari Kermanshah	10	7	1	2	21	6	+15	22	Promotion to Second round
3	Sh. Hamedan	10	6	2	2	20	10	+10	20	
4	Niroye Javan	10	5	2	3	14	16	−2	17	
5	Noroz Bukan	10	4	1	5	11	9	+2	13	Relegation to Provincial Leagues 2015–16
6	Naftoon Tehran	10	3	4	3	7	9	−2	13	Relegation to Provincial Leagues 2015–16
7	Kalasmiyan Zanjan	10	4	0	6	11	15	−4	12	Relegation to Provincial Leagues 2015–16
8	Afra Darb Azar	10	3	1	6	8	18	−10	10	Relegation to Provincial Leagues 2015–16
9	Zoratkaran	10	2	4	4	12	14	−2	10	Relegation to Provincial Leagues 2015–16
10	Abidar Sanandaj	10	2	2	6	10	16	−6	8	Relegation to Provincial Leagues 2015–16
11	Mahdiye Tabriz	10	2	2	6	5	18	−13	8	Relegation to Provincial Leagues 2015–16

Updated to match(es) played on 15 December 2014. Source:
Rules for classification: 1) points; 2) goal difference; 3) number of goals scored.

=== Group D ===
Pos	Team	Pld	W	D	L	GF	GA	GD	Pts	Qualification or relegation
1	Pouyandegan Marvdasht	9	6	0	3	15	5	+10	18	Promotion to Second round
2	Naftoon Masjed Soleyman	9	5	3	1	15	7	+8	18	Promotion to Second round
3	Sh. Mahshahr	9	5	2	2	13	4	+9	17	
4	Est. Molasani	9	5	0	4	19	11	+8	15	
5	Patu Laleh Isfahan	9	3	5	1	11	9	+2	14	Relegation to Provincial Leagues 2015–16
6	Helal Ahmar Saveh	9	4	2	3	10	10	0	14	Relegation to Provincial Leagues 2015–16
7	Fajr Dehloran	9	2	6	1	10	8	+2	12	Relegation to Provincial Leagues 2015–16
8	Shahin Baghak	9	3	1	5	10	15	−5	10	Relegation to Provincial Leagues 2015–16
9	Palayesh Arak	9	0	3	6	5	19	−14	3	Relegation to Provincial Leagues 2015–16
10	Est. Charam	9	1	2	6	6	26	−20	5	Relegation to Provincial Leagues 2015–16

Updated to match(es) played on 15 December 2014. Source:
Rules for classification: 1) points; 2) goal difference; 3) number of goals scored.

=== Group E ===
Pos	Team	Pld	W	D	L	GF	GA	GD	Pts	Qualification or relegation
1	Sh. Firuzabad	9	6	3	0	12	4	+8	21	Promotion to Second round
2	Persepolis Zahedan	9	6	2	1	16	12	+4	20	Promotion to Second round
3	Mes Novin Kerman	9	6	1	2	29	10	+19	19	
4	Toloe Yaran Isfahan	9	3	3	3	16	18	−2	12	
5	Sh. Kerman	9	3	3	3	8	14	−6	12	Relegation to Provincial Leagues 2015–16
6	Shahin Robatkarim	9	3	2	4	12	11	+1	11	Relegation to Provincial Leagues 2015–16
7	Heyat Zabol	9	3	1	5	14	17	−3	10	Relegation to Provincial Leagues 2015–16
8	Arvand Bandar Abbas	9	2	2	5	14	17	−3	8	Relegation to Provincial Leagues 2015–16
9	Shahin Sepehr Kish	9	2	1	6	16	20	−4	7	Relegation to Provincial Leagues 2015–16
10	Sh. Zarch	9	1	2	6	9	23	−14	5	Relegation to Provincial Leagues 2015–16

Updated to match(es) played on 15 December 2014. Source:
Rules for classification: 1) points; 2) goal difference; 3) number of goals scored.

== Second round ==
=== Group A ===
Pos	Team	Pld	W	D	L	GF	GA	GD	Pts	Promotion or qualification
1	Moghavemat Tehran	22	12	7	3	31	13	+18	43	Promotion to 2nd Division 2015–16
2	Rahpouyan Rezvanshahr	22	12	7	3	26	17	+9	43	Promotion to 2nd Division 2015–16
3	Irandad Tehran	22	11	8	3	36	21	+15	41	Second Round - 3rd Division 2015-16
4	Sh. Fuman	22	12	3	7	30	20	+10	39	Second Round - 3rd Division 2015-16
5	Emarat Gorgan	22	9	6	7	37	29	+8	33	Second Round - 3rd Division 2015-16
6	Omid Hasanabad	22	8	7	7	28	23	+5	31	Second Round - 3rd Division 2015-16
7	Sh.Karimi Juybar	22	7	9	6	23	16	+7	30	First Round - 3rd Division 2015-16
8	Shohadaye Sari	22	9	3	10	24	22	+2	30	First Round - 3rd Division 2015-16
9	Sh. Langarud	22	6	8	8	23	31	−8	26	First Round - 3rd Division 2015-16
10	Darya Babol	22	4	5	13	16	35	−19	17	First Round - 3rd Division 2015-16
11	Chooka	22	3	7	12	17	35	−18	16	First Round - 3rd Division 2015-16
12	H.F. Zirab	22	0	8	14	23	51	−28	8	First Round - 3rd Division 2015-16

Updated to match(es) played on 1 June 2015. Source:
Rules for classification: 1) points; 2) goal difference; 3) number of goals scored.

=== Group B ===
Pos	Team	Pld	W	D	L	GF	GA	GD	Pts	Promotion or qualification
1	Kara Shiraz	22	14	5	3	36	9	+27	47	Promotion to 2nd Division 2015–16
2	Sh. Mahshahr	22	12	7	3	33	14	+19	43	Promotion to 2nd Division 2015–16
3	Ostandari Kermanshah	22	12	3	7	35	28	+7	39	Second Round - 3rd Division 2015-16
4	Bargh Shiraz	22	8	9	5	25	23	+2	33	Second Round - 3rd Division 2015-16
5	Sh. Arak	22	8	8	6	28	20	+8	32	Second Round - 3rd Division 2015-16
6	Farhang Ramhormoz	22	8	5	9	26	31	−5	29	Second Round - 3rd Division 2015-16
7	Sh. Firuzabad	22	7	7	8	24	26	−2	28	First Round - 3rd Division 2015-16
8	Naftoon Masjed Soleyman	22	6	8	8	22	27	−5	26	First Round - 3rd Division 2015-16
9	Pouyandegan Marvdasht	22	6	6	10	16	28	−12	24	First Round - 3rd Division 2015-16
10	Persepolis Zahedan	22	6	5	11	26	30	−4	23	First Round - 3rd Division 2015-16
11	Shahin Bushehr	22	5	5	12	20	34	−14	20	First Round - 3rd Division 2015-16
12	Minab Toyur	22	3	4	15	16	38	−22	13	First Round - 3rd Division 2015-16

Updated to match(es) played on 1 June 2015. Source:
Rules for classification: 1) points; 2) goal difference; 3) number of goals scored.
