= Sepahan Novin F.C. =

Iranian football club

Sepahan Novin سپاهان نوين
- Full name: Foolad Mobarakeh Sepahan Football Club
- Short name: Sepahan Novin
- Founded: 2003
- Ground: Safaiye; Isfahan; Iran
- Capacity: 5,000
- Chairman: (Iran) Hooman Firouzi
- Head Coach: (Iran) Mojtaba Tootooni
- League: 3rd Division
- 2009–10: Azadegan League Group 1, 4th
Home colours	Away colours

Sepahan Novin Football Club (Persian: باشگاه فوتبال سپاهان نوین) is an Iranian professional football team based in Esfahan, Iran. They are the reserve team of Sepahan F.C. and currently compete in the 2011–12 Iran Football's 3rd Division.

== History ==
Sepahan Novin Isfahan Football Club was established in 2004.

In its inaugural year, the team won the regional championships and earned promotion to the Iranian Third Division.

In 2005, the team won the Third Division title and was promoted to the Iranian Second Division. Additionally, the team has secured the championship title in the Isfahan provincial leagues twice.

Sepahan Novin has also won the Second Division championship once.

Sepahan Novin was revived in 2018 and began competing in the Iranian Third Division.

== Season-by-season ==
The table below chronicles the achievements of Sepahan Novin in various competitions since 2004.

Season	League	Position	Hazfi Cup	Notes
2003–04	Isfahan Province League	1st	Did not qualify	Promoted
2004–05	3rd Division	1st	First Round	Promoted
2005–06	2nd Division	7th	First Round
2006–07	2nd Division	1st	First Round	Promoted
2007–08	Azadegan League	2nd	First Round
2008–09	Azadegan League	6th	1/16 Final
2009–10	Azadegan League	4th	1/16 Final
2010–11	3rd Division	4th/Group 3	Did not qualify
2011–12	3rd Division	5th/Group B	Did not qualify
2012–13	3rd Division	7th/Group 7	Did not qualify	Relegated
2013–14			Did not qualify
2014–15			Did not qualify
2015–16			Did not qualify
2016–17			Did not qualify
2017–18			Did not qualify
2018–19	3rd Division - 2nd Stage	4th/Group C	Did not qualify
2019–20	3rd Division - 2nd Stage	7th/Group C	Did not qualify
2020–21	3rd Division - 2nd Stage	3rd/Group C	Did not qualify
2021–22	3rd Division - 2nd Stage	2nd/Group C	Did not qualify	Promoted to Play-Offs (1st Round)
2022–23	3rd Division - 2nd Stage	2nd/Group C	Did not qualify	Promoted to Play-Offs (1st Round)
2023–24	3rd Division - 2nd Stage		Did not qualify

== Club managers ==
- (Iran) Hossein Charkhabi (2004–2008)
- (Brazil) Ralf Borges Ferreira (2008–2009)
- (Iran) Amrollah Soltani (2009–2010)
- (Iran) Hossein Charkhabi (2010)
- (Iran) Amrollah Soltani (2010–)

== See also ==
- Hazfi Cup
- Iran Football's 3rd Division 2011–12
- Foolad Natanz F.C.
- Sepahan F.C.
