= Persepolis Ganaveh F.C. =

Iranian football club

- Full name: Persepolis Ganaveh Football Club
- Short name: Persepolis Ganaveh
- Ground: Shahid Seraji Stadium, Ganaveh, Iran
- Head Coach: (Iran) Nader Jafari Monfared
- League: 2nd Division
- 2014–15: 2nd Division Group A, 7th
- Website: http://www.perspolis-genaveh.blogfa.com/
Home colours	Away colours

Persepolis Ganaveh Football Club is an Iranian football club based in Ganaveh, Iran. They are one of the branches of Persepolis.

== Season-by-season ==
The table below chronicles the achievements of Persepolis Ganaveh in various competitions since 2007.

Season	League	Position	Hazfi Cup	Notes
2007–08	3rd Division		Did not Qualify
2008–09	3rd Division	1st	Did not Qualify	Promoted
2009–10	2nd Division	6th	First Round
2010–11	2nd Division	14th/Group B	Did not qualify
2011–12	3rd Division	1st		Promoted
2012–13	2nd Division	6th/Group B
2013–14	2nd Division	10th/Group B
2014–15	2nd Division	7th/Group A	Third Round

== Head coaches ==
- (Iran) Nader Jafari Monfared

== See also ==
- Hazfi Cup
- Iran Football's 3rd Division 2011–12
