= Bahman Shiraz F.C. =

Iranian football club

Bahman Shiraz باشگاه فوتبال بهمن شیراز
- Full name: Bahman Shiraz Football Club
- Founded: 1999; 16 years ago
- Dissolved: 2015
- Ground: Hafezieh Stadium; Shiraz; Iran
- Capacity: 14,000
- Head Coach: Vahid Rezaei
- League: Azadegan League
- 2014–15: 2nd Division Group B, 1st (Promoted)
- Website: http://www.fcbahman.ir//

Bahman Shiraz Football Club (Persian: بهمن شیراز) is an Iranian football club based in Shiraz, Iran.They currently compete in the Azadegan League.

In 2015 for the first time in the club's history, Bahman was promoted to the Azadegan League.

== Season-by-Season ==
The table below shows the achievements of the club in various competitions.

Season	League	Position	Hazfi Cup	Notes
2012–13	3rd Division	1st		Promoted
2013–14	2nd Division	5th
2014–15	2nd Division	1st	Fourth Round	Promoted

== See also ==
- 2014–15 Iran Football's 2nd Division
