= Karun Khuzestan F.C. =

Iranian football club

Karun Khuzestan
- Full name: Karun Khuzestan Football Club.
- Founded: 2012
- Ground: Ghadir Stadium; Ahvaz; Iran
- League: 2nd Division
- 2014–15: 2nd Division Group A, 6th

Karun Khuzestan Football Club is an Iranian football club based in Ahvaz, Iran.

== Season-by-season ==
The table below shows the achievements of the club in various competitions.

| Season | League | Position | Hazfi Cup | Notes |
|---|---|---|---|---|
| 2013–14 | 2nd Division | 9th | Didn't Enter |
| 2014–15 | 2nd Division | 6th | Round of 32 |

== See also ==
- 2013–14 Iran Football's 2nd Division
