= F.C. Shahrdari Bandar Abbas =

Iranian football club

Shahrdari Bandar Abbas شهرداری بندر عباس
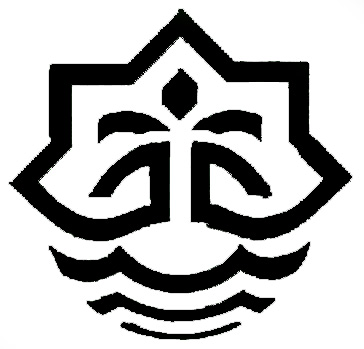
- Full name: Football Club Shahrdari Bandar Abbas
- Founded: 2006; 19 years ago
- Ground: Takhti Stadium; Bandar Abbas, Iran
- Capacity: 10,000
- Chairman: Abdolreza Naderipour
- Head Coach: Arash Borhani
- League: Iran Football's 2nd Division
- 2014–15: Group B, 11th (relegated )
Home colours	Away colours

Football Club Shahrdari Bandar Abbas (Persian: شهرداری بندر عباس, Shiherdari-ye Bendâr Obas) is an Iranian football club based in Bandar Abbas, Iran. They currently compete in Iran Football's 2nd Division.

== History ==
=== Establishment ===
At the end of the 2005–06 season Esteghlal Kish, a team based on the island of Kish were dissolved and their licence was purchased by Shahrdari Bandar Abbas, allowing them to compete in the Azadegan League for the 2006–07 season where they were successful and nearly managed to get promotion to the Iran Pro League. Rah Ahan F.C. prevented their promotion beating them 5–0 on aggregate with the second match being abandoned due to crowd trouble meaning a 3–0 loss for Shahrdari.

=== Azadegan League ===
In 2012, Shahrdari missed out on promotion by finishing third, one spot behind the last promotion spot. In 2013, Shahrdari had a disappointing season as they finished an average 8th place. The following year they again had an average season finishing 6th.

=== 2nd Division ===
In the 2014–15 Azadegan League season, Shahrdari finished 11th in Group B and was relegated to the 2nd Division.

== Club managers ==
=== Managerial history ===
Name	Period
(Iran) Majid Namjoo-Motlagh	2006–2007
(Iran) Nader Dastneshan	2007
(Iran) Rasoul Korbekandi	2007–2008
(Iran) Nosrat Irandoost	2008–2009
(Iran) Abbas Sarkhab	2009–2010
(Argentina) Carlos Fabián Leeb	2010–2011
(Portugal) Acácio Casimiro	2011–2012
(Iran) Abbas Sarkhab	2012
(Iran) Abdolrahim Khorazmi	2012–

== Season-by-season ==
The table below chronicles the achievements of Shahrdari Bandar Abbas in various competitions since 2006.

Season	League	Position	Hazfi Cup	Notes
2006–07	Azadegan League	2nd	First Round	Play Off
2007–08	Azadegan League	7th	Second Round
2008–09	Azadegan League	11th	1/16 Final
2009–10	Azadegan League	7th	Third Round
2010–11	Azadegan League	5th	1/8 Final
2011–12	Azadegan League	3rd	Second Round
2012–13	Azadegan League	8th
2013–14	Azadegan League	6th	Fourth Round
