= Sherkat-e Khalkhal Dasht F.C. =

Iranian football club

Khalkhal Dasht
- Full name: Sherkate Khalkhal Dasht Football Club
- Founded: 28 August 2011
- Ground: Takhti Khalkhal
- Head Coach: (Iran) Hamid Shahnavazi
- League: 2nd Division

Sherkate Khalkhal Dasht Football Club is an Iranian football club based in Khalkhal, Iran. They currently compete in the Iran Football's 2nd Division.

== Season-by-Season ==
The table below shows the achievements of the club in various competitions.

Season	League	Position	Hazfi Cup	Notes
2011–12	3rd Division	7th/Group 1

== See also ==
- Hazfi Cup
- Iran Football's 3rd Division 2011–12
