= Kara Gostar Shabestar F.C. =

Iranian football club

Mes Soongoun Varzaghan F.C.
- Full name: Mes Soongoun Varzaghan Football Club
- Nickname: The Orange Tulips
- Founded: May 1, 2010
- Dissolved: May 19, 2026
- Ground: Shahid Qasem Soleimani
- Capacity: 20,000
- Owner: National Iranian Copper Industries Company
- Chairman: Naqi Nasiri
- Coach: Ahmad Rostami
- League: Azadegan League
- 2024–25: Azadegan League, 14th
Home colours	Away colours

Mes Soongoun Varzaghan Football Club is an Iranian football club based in Varzaghan.

== History ==
The club was founded on 1 May 2010 as Mes Soongoun Varzaghan F.C., the football section of Mes Soongoun Sport Club, representing the National Iranian Copper Industries Company in Varzaqan, East Azerbaijan province, Iran. The club purchased the licence of Shahin Ahvaz F.C. to participate in the Iran 2nd Division for the 2010–11 season.

In its inaugural season, Mes Soongoun finished 13th in Group B of the 2nd Division and was relegated to the Iran 3rd Division. The club earned promotion back to the 2nd Division the following season and remained in the lower tiers of Iranian football for several years.

Ahead of the 2014–15 season, Mes Soongoun replaced Melli Pooshan Tabriz F.C. in the Azadegan League, following the latter club's withdrawal due to financial difficulties. Since then, the club has competed in the second tier of Iranian football.

=== Transfer to Karagostar ===
Following the conclusion of the 2024–25 season, the football section of Mes Soongoun Sport Club was transferred to Karagostar. The transfer was approved by the relevant Iranian football authorities, and the club was subsequently renamed Karagostar Shabestar F.C.. A new club identity, including a redesigned crest and green home colours, was unveiled following the ownership change.

The transfer applied only to the football team. Mes Soongoun Sport Club continues to operate its teams in other sports, including futsal, under its original name.

== Season-by-season ==
The table below shows the achievements of the club in various competitions.

Season	League	Position	Hazfi Cup	Notes
2010–11	2nd Division	13th/Group B	Did not qualify	Relegated
2011–12	3rd Division	5th	Did not qualify	Promoted
2012–13	2nd Division	3rd	Did not qualify
2013–14	2nd Division	3rd	Did not qualify
2022–23	2nd Division	1st	Third Round	Promoted

== See also ==
- Hazfi Cup
- Iran Football's 2nd Division 2014–15
