= Shahrdari Dezful F.C. =

Iranian football club

- Full name: Shahrdari Dezful Football Club
- Short name: Shahrdari Dezful
- League: 3rd Division
- 2014–15: 2nd Division Group D, 8th (relegated)

Shahrdari Dezful Football Club is an Iranian football club based in Dezful, Iran.

They competed in the 2010–11 Iran Football's 3rd Division, but could not advance to the second round. They finally got the 7th place of Group 6.

However, in 2011–12 Iranian football pre-season, they replaced by the club Foolad Natanz in 2011–12 Iran Football's 2nd Division.

They currently compete in the 3rd Division.

== Season-by-Season ==
The table below shows the achievements of the club in various competitions.

Season	League	Position	Hazfi Cup	Notes
2010–11	3rd Division	7th/Group 6	Did not qualify
2011–12	2nd Division

== Notes ==
- The club official website
- The club fans website

== See also ==
- Hazfi Cup
- 2011–12 Iran Football's 2nd Division
