= Kargar Boneh Gaz F.C. =

Iranian football club

Kargar Boneh Gez Bushehr
- Full name: Kargar Boneh Gez Bushehr
- Founded: 1980; 37 years ago
- Ground: Boneh Gaz
- Manager: Abbas Sarkhab
- League: 2nd Division

Kargar Boneh Gez Bueshehr Football Club is an Iranian football club based in Bushehr, Iran founded in 1980 that competes in the 2nd Division.

== Season-by-season ==
The table below shows the achievements of the club in various competitions.

| Season | League | Position | Hazfi Cup | Notes |
|---|---|---|---|---|
| 2013–14 | 2nd Division | 8th/Group A | Third Round |
