= Shams Azar F.C. =

Iranian football club

Shams Azar Football Club
- Full name: Shams Azar Football Club
- Nickname: Yashmi Pushaan (Jade Wearers)
- Founded: 2012; 14 years ago
- Ground: Sardar Azadegan Stadium; Qazvin, Iran
- Capacity: 15,000
- Owner: Shams Azar Food Industry Company
- Chairman: Abbas Alaei Moghadam
- Coach: Vahid Rezaei
- League: Persian Gulf Pro League
- 2025–26: Persian Gulf Pro League, 13th of 16
- Website: https://shamsazarfc.ir/
Home colours	Away colours

Shams Azar Football Club is an Iranian football club based in Qazvin, Iran. They currently compete in the Persian Gulf Pro League.

== History ==
Shams Azar is the first team of Qazvin Province after Paykan in the Iran Pro League. In September 2012, they bought the license of Kaveh football club in order to participate in 2013–14 Iran Football's 2nd Division. This team won the eighth place in the first season of its participation in the Persian Gulf League.

== Honours ==
- Azadegan League
  - Champions (1): 2022–23

== Season-by-season ==
Season	Division	Position	Hazfi Cup
2020–21	2nd Division	6th	—
2021–22	Azadegan League	9th	Round of 32
2022–23	Azadegan League	1st	—
2023–24	Persian Gulf Pro League	8th	Round of 32
2024–25	Persian Gulf Pro League	13th	Round of 16
2025–26	Persian Gulf Pro League	—	—

== Players ==
As of 5 November 2026

=== First Team ===
Note: Flags indicate national team as defined under FIFA eligibility rules; some limited exceptions apply. Players may hold more than one non-FIFA nationality.

No.	Pos.	Nation	Player
1	GK	IRI	Mehrshad Asadi
2	DF	IRI	Mohammad Nejadmehdi (Captain)
3	DF	IRI	Amir Hossein Chegini ^{U23}
4	DF	IRI	Mohammadreza Rezaei
7	FW	IRI	Reza Mohammadi ^{U25}
9	FW	IRI	Kianoush Moazami Goudarzi ^{U23}
10	MF	IRI	Amirmohammad Mohkamkar ^{U25}
11	MF	IRI	Mehdi Mamizadeh
12	DF	IRI	Ebrahim Moradi
13	GK	IRI	Mohammadreza Mohammadi ^{U23}
14	MF	IRI	Mohammad Mahan Kiani ^{U21}
16	FW	IRI	Mohammad Mehdi Mansouri ^{U23}
17	MF	IRI	Mehrdad Aghamohammadi ^{U19}
18	MF	IRI	Ali Jelokhani ^{U19}
19	DF	IRI	Amir Reza Karami ^{U21}

No.	Pos.	Nation	Player
20	DF	IRI	Ali Rezaei
23	DF	IRI	Seyed Mehdi Hosseini ^{U19}
26	FW	IRI	Mohammad Parsa Rahimi ^{U19}
30	DF	IRI	Amir Taher
34	MF	IRI	Mohammad Sadra Ezzatkhah ^{U21}
48	FW	IRI	Mohammad Milad Sourgi ^{U25}
49	GK	IRI	Adib Zarei ^{U23} (on loan from Tractor)
55	MF	IRI	Soheil Lashgari ^{U23}
66	MF	IRI	Mohammad Javad Azadeh
71	FW	IRI	Sina Moazemitabar ^{U21}
86	MF	IRI	Ahmad Nasiri
90	FW	IRI	Armin Ebrahimi ^{U19}
98	GK	IRI	Mohammad Bagher Eshghi ^{U19}
99	FW	IRI	Ahoora Zand ^{U19}
—	MF	IRI	Saber Hardani

- U19 = Under 19 year player. U21 = Under 21 year player. U23 = Under 23 year player. U25 = Under 25 year quota.

== Technical staff ==
Position	Staff
Head coach	(Iran) Vahid Rezaei
Assistant Manager	(Iran) Ghasem Razmi
Goalkeeping Coach	(Iran) Shahram Mehraban
Chief Financial Officer	(Iran) Mohammad Rahman Salari
Owner	(Iran) Davoud Pouresmaeil
Team Manager	(Iran) Mosaeb Chegini
