= 2025–26 Hazfi Cup =

39th season of the Iranian football knockout competition

Iranian Knockout Cup

Tournament details
- Country: Iran
- Teams: 86

Official website
- www.hazfi-cup.com

The 2025–26 Hazfi Cup was the 39th season of the Hazfi Cup, the annual knockout football competition in Iran. Organized by the Football Federation Islamic Republic of Iran, the tournament features 86 clubs from different levels of the Iranian football league system. The winners will qualify for the group stage of the 2026–27 AFC Champions League Two.

Esteghlal are the defending champions after winning their eighth Hazfi Cup title in the previous season.

== Teams ==
The participating teams are divided into four main categories: the Persian Gulf Pro League, Azadegan League, League 2, and provincial league clubs.

Persian Gulf Pro League All 16 clubs competing in the 2025–26 Persian Gulf Pro League	Azadegan League All 18 clubs competing in the 2025–26 Azadegan League	League 2 Clubs competing in the 2025–26 Iran League 2	Provincial league champions and League 3 & League 4 clubs 24 provincial league clubs
Foolad; Persepolis; Sepahan; Esteghlal; Tractor; Aluminium Arak; Kheybar Khorramabad; Zob Ahan; Chadormalu; Gol Gohar; Malavan; Mes Rafsanjan; Esteghlal Khuzestan; Paykan; Shams Azar; Fajr Sepasi	Ario Eslamshahr; Damash Gilan; Havadar; Shahrdari Noshahr; Nassaji; Ba'sat Kermanshah; Mes Sungun; Pars Jonoubi Jam; Fard Alborz; Mes Shahr-e Babak; Naft & Gaz Gachsaran; Palayesh Naft; Shenavarsazi; Mes Kerman; Saipa; Navad Urmia; Sanat Naft Abadan; Nirooye Zamini	Shahrdari Astara; Naft Masjed Soleyman; Shahr Raz Shiraz; Foolad Hormozgan; Shahin Bandar Ameri; Shahrdari Mahshahr; Chooka; Kia Academy; Yasa Tehran; Padyab Khalkhal; Foolad Novin Khuzestan; Sepahan Novin; Shahid Ghandi; Esteghlal Zahedan; Shahin Tehran; Nika Pars Chalous; Shahrdari Bandar Abbas; Iranjavan Bushehr; Sepidrood; Pas Hamedan; Espad Alvand Tehran; Omid Tehran	Hamid Eslamabad-e Gharb; Setareh Sorkh Tuyserkan; Shahrdari Marivan; Fardad Abdanan; Iranjavan Khormuj; Ghasedak Landeh; Shahin Kish; Pishgaman Shiraz; Kia Tarom Zanjan; Deylamian Siahkal; Baleharoud Bileh Savar; Houra Sport Urmia; Kalbadi Nejad Galugah; Kia Shahroud; Paykan Novin Bojnord; Kosar Varamin; Shahr Arka Alborz; Esteghlal Sayna Delijan; Shahbal Talaei Tehran; Sarzamin Aftab Barkhar; Fajr Bidokht Gonabad; Part Goval Manujan; Islamic Azad University Khatam; Baluch Academy Sistan

== First stage ==
=== First round ===
The draw for the first round was held on 10 September 2025. Twenty-four teams from the provincial leagues entered the competition at this stage. The ten winners advanced to the second round, where they were joined by clubs from the 2025–26 Iran 2nd Division. As only 24 teams entered the first round, the matches were played in two phases.

Number of teams per tier entering this round
Pro League (1)	1st Division (2)	2nd Division (3)	Provincial Leagues (4)	Total
0 / 16	0 / 18	0 / 28	24 / 24	24 / 86
