= FC Dena Yasuj =

Dena Yasuj
- Full name: Dena Yasuj Football Club
- Founded: 2025; 1 year ago
- Ground: Takhti Stadium, Yasuj
- Capacity: 7,000
- Manager: Ghasem Sianaki
- League: League 2 (Iran)

Football Club Dena Yasuj (Persian: باشگاه فوتبال دنای یاسوج) is an Iranian football club based in Yasuj, the capital of Kohgiluyeh and Boyer-Ahmad Province. The club has competed in the Iranian football league system, including the League 2 (Iran) and provincial competitions. FC Dena Yasuj is known for developing local talent and representing one of the most mountainous regions of southwestern Iran.

== History ==
Dena Yasuj Football Club was founded in 2025 (1404) and began its competitive activities in the provincial league system. The club quickly progressed through the Iranian football pyramid, earning promotion from the Iran League 3 to the Iran League 2, where it currently competes.

Local media have covered the club’s participation in regional competitions and its youth development programs.

== Stadium ==
The club plays its home matches at Takhti Stadium in Yasuj, a multi-purpose venue used by several local teams.

== Club identity ==
=== Name ===
The club is named after Mount Dena, one of the highest peaks in the Zagros Mountains and a cultural symbol of the region.

=== Colors ===
Match reports indicate that the club traditionally uses:

- Blue (home)
- White (away)

== Current squads ==
Note: Flags indicate national team as defined under FIFA eligibility rules; some limited exceptions apply. Players may hold more than one non-FIFA nationality.

No.	Pos.	Nation	Player
99	GK	IRI	Reza Kakhsaz
88	DF	IRI	Mehran Soltanizadeh
87	FW	IRI	Alireza Hemmati
84	FW	IRI	Amirhossein Saeedpour
82	DF	IRI	Reza Asadpour
80	MF	IRI	Farshad Khorrami
77	DF	IRI	Mohammadtaghi Movvadat
72	FW	IRI	Matin Gharehbeigi
70	FW	IRI	Ali Fateh
52	MF	IRI	Alireza Safaei
43	GK	IRI	Kaveh Alizadeh
43	GK	IRI	Kaveh Alizadeh
31	DF	IRI	Mohammad Jafari
27	FW	IRI	Abolfazl Taherinejad
23	FW	IRI	Erfan Gholami
22	GK	IRI	Erfan Gholami
21	FW	IRI	Amirhossein Salarinik

No.	Pos.	Nation	Player
20	FW	IRI	Hamed Daneshkhah
19	FW	IRI	Ali Rajaei
17	MF	IRI	Shayan Abdolkhani
14	DF	IRI	Abolfazl Norouzi
11	FW	IRI	Pedram Hamidifar
10	FW	IRI	Vahid Kheshtan
9	FW	IRI	Sadrallah Ashena
8	MF	IRI	Rouhollah Mondanipour
7	MF	IRI	Ahmad Mohammadian (captain)
6	DF	IRI	Hossein Kholghifar
4	DF	IRI	Davoud Shahroei
3	DF	IRI	Mohammadreza Saberi
2	DF	IRI	Milad Mehrshad

== Competitions ==
Dena Yasuj has competed in:

- Iran League 2 (current, 2026)
- Kohgiluyeh and Boyer-Ahmad Provincial League
- Regional Cup competitions

These competitions are organized under the Iranian Football League Organization.

== Season-by-season ==
Season	League	Position	Notes
2024–25	Provincial League	–	Club founded; first competitive season
2025–26	Iran League 2	–	Promoted to League 2

== Youth development ==
The club operates youth teams that participate in provincial youth leagues.

== Supporters ==
The club enjoys support from local football fans in Yasuj, where football is one of the most popular sports.
