= 2026–27 Azadegan League =

36th season of Azadegan League

Azadegan League
- Season: 2026–27
- Dates: 15 September 2026
- All statistics correct as of 25 August 2026.

The 2026–27 Azadegan League is the 36th season of the Azadegan League and the 26th season of the competition since its establishment in 1991. The league has been held as the second tier of Iranian football since 2001.

The season features 12 teams from the 2025–26 Azadegan League, one team relegated from the 2025–26 Persian Gulf Pro League, Mes Rafsanjan, and three newly promoted teams from the 2025–26 League 2: Foolad Novin Khuzestan, the League 2 champions, Naft Masjed Soleyman, the League 2 runners-up, and Shahin Bandar Ameri, the winners of the League 2 play-off.

== Teams ==
Promoted from 2024–25 League 2	Relegated from 2024–25 Persian Gulf Pro League
New teams
Foolad Novin (promoted for the third time in its history); Naft Masjed Soleyman (returned to the Azadegan League after one season); Shahin Bandar Ameri	Mes Rafsanjan (relegated after two seasons in the Persian Gulf Pro League)
Relegated to 2026–27 League 2	Promoted to 2026–27 Persian Gulf Pro League
Previous season's teams
Shahrdari Nowshahr; Navad Urmia; Damash Gilan	Nassaji Mazandaran (promoted to the Persian Gulf Pro League after one season in the Azadegan League); Mes Shahr-e Babak (the club's first promotion to the Persian Gulf Pro League)

=== Stadia and locations ===
Locations of clubs in 2026–27 Azadegan League

Team	Location	Stadium	Capacity
Ario	Eslamshahr	Shuhada-ye Eslamshahr Stadium	7,000
Be'sat	Kermanshah	Azadi Stadium	7,000
Fard	Karaj	Enghelab Stadium	13,600
Foolad B	Ahvaz	Foolad Khuzestan Stadium	3,000
Havadar	Tehran	Dastgerdi Stadium	8,250
Kara Gostar	Shabestar	Shahid Bakeri Stadium	15,000
Mes Kerman	Kerman	Shohadaye Mes Kerman Stadium	30,000
Mes Rafsanjan	Rafsanjan	Mes Rafsanjan Stadium	10,000
Naft Gachsaran	Gachsaran	Shohadaye Naft Gachsaran Stadium	7,000
Naft M.I.S	Masjed Soleyman	Behnam Mohammadi Stadium	8,000
Niroye Zamini	Tehran	Ghadir Stadium	2,500
Palayesh Naft	Bandar Abbas	Khalij Fars Stadium	10,000
Pars Jonoubi	Jam	Takhti Stadium	15,000
Qeshm Island	Qeshm	Pip Posht Qeshm Stadium	5,000
Saipa	Tehran	Dastgerdi Stadium	8,250
Shahin	Bandar Ameri	Shahid Mahdavi Stadium	15,000

== League table ==
Pos	Team	Pld	W	D	L	GF	GA	GD	Pts	Promotion or relegation
1	Pars Jonoubi	9	6	3	0	12	4	+8	21	Promotion to 2027–28 Persian Gulf Pro League
2	Qeshm Island	9	5	3	1	8	4	+4	18	Promotion to 2027–28 Persian Gulf Pro League
3	Fard Alborz	9	5	2	2	16	7	+9	17	
4	Mes Rafsanjan	9	4	4	1	7	2	+5	16	
5	Kara Gostar	9	4	3	2	9	8	+1	15	
6	Shahin B.A	9	3	4	2	11	11	0	13	
7	Ario Eslamshahr	9	4	1	4	9	9	0	13	
8	Naft Gachsaran	9	3	3	3	9	8	+1	12	
9	Foolad B	9	2	6	1	8	7	+1	12	
10	Saipa	9	3	3	3	6	6	0	12	
11	Naft M.I.S	9	3	2	4	12	10	+2	11	
12	Beasat	9	2	3	4	8	10	−2	9	
13	Mes Kerman	9	1	4	4	6	9	−3	7	
14	Palayesh Naft	9	1	4	4	5	13	−8	7	Relegation to League 2
15	Niroye Zamini	9	1	1	7	5	14	−9	4	Relegation to League 2
16	Havadar	9	0	4	5	1	10	−9	4	Relegation to League 2

Updated to match(es) played on 2026-11-10. Source: Soccerway
Rules for classification: 1) Points; 2) Head-to-head points; 3) Head-to-head goal difference; 4) Head-to-head goals scored; 5) Goal difference; 6) Goals scored.

== Managers ==
Teams competing in the season
Team	Manager	Team	Manager
Ario Eslamshahr	Vahid Bayatloo	Be'sat Kermanshah	Mohammad Mirtorabi
Pars Jonoubi Jam	Mehdi Rajabzadeh	Palayesh Naft Bandar Abbas	Ebrahim Sadeghi
Qeshm Island	Mojtaba Jabbari	Saipa	Gholamreza Enayati
Shahin Bandar Ameri	Reza Rabiei	Fard Alborz	Farid Safaei-Fard
Foolad Novin Khuzestan	Ayoub Vali	Karagoster	Ahad Rostami
Mes Rafsanjan	Farshad Pious	Mes Kerman	Farzad Hosseinkhani
Naft M.I.S	Mehdi Pashazadeh	Naft-o-Gaz Gachsaran	Samad Marfavi
Nirooye Zamini	Amir Abhari	Havadar	
