= Morteza Kashi =

Iranian football player (born 1981)

Personal information
- Full name: Morteza Kashi
- Date of birth: May 4, 1981 (age 45)
- Place of birth: Tehran, Iran
- Position: Centre-back

Team information
- Current team: Esteghlal B (assistant)

Youth career
- Paykan

Senior career*
| Years | Team | Apps | (Gls) |
| 2002–2003 | Homa | 100 | (9) |
| 2003–2006 | Paykan | 98 | (1) |
| 2006–2014 | Saba | 171 | (1) |

International career
| 2001 | Iran U20 | 3 | (0) |
| 2011 | Iran | 0 | (0) |

Managerial career
- 2018–2019: Ehsan Rey U17
- 2020–2021: Ehsan Rey U17
- 2021–2022: Parsian Youth
- 2022–2023: Parsian FC U17
- 2023–2024: Havadar U21
- 2024–2025: Parsian FC U17
- 2025–: Esteghlal B (assistant)
- * Club domestic league appearances and goals as of 10 May 2014

Morteza Kashi (born May 4, 1981) is an Iranian football player who plays in the defender position. He is currently a member of the Iran's Premier League football club, Saba Qom.

== Club career ==
Kashi started his career at Azadegan League club Homa FC, before moving to then Azadegan League side Paykan. His transfer to the IPL outfit Saba Battery in 2006 was his debut in the Premier League.

=== Club career statistics ===
As of 10 May 2014

| Club performance | | | League | | Cup | | Continental | | Total | |
| Season | Club | League | Apps | Goals | Apps | Goals | Apps | Goals | Apps | Goals |
| Iran | | | League | | Hazfi Cup | | Asia | | Total | |
|---|---|---|---|---|---|---|---|---|---|---|
| 2003–04 | Paykan | Pro League | | 2 | | | – | – | | |
| 2004–05 | Paykan | Pro League | 25 | 1 | | | – | – | | |
| 2005–06 | Paykan | Division 1 | | | | | – | – | | |
| 2006–07 | Saba | Pro League | 25 | 0 | | | – | – | | |
| 2007–08 | Saba | Pro League | 27 | 0 | | | – | – | | |
| 2008–09 | Saba | Pro League | 17 | 0 | | | 6 | 0 | | |
| 2009–10 | Saba | Pro League | 27 | 0 | | | – | – | | |
| 2010–11 | Saba | Pro League | 30 | 1 | 1 | 0 | – | – | 31 | 1 |
| 2011–12 | Saba | Pro League | 4 | 0 | 0 | 0 | – | – | 4 | 0 |
| 2012–13 | Saba | Pro League | 20 | 0 | 2 | 0 | 1 | 0 | 23 | 0 |
| 2013–14 | Saba | Pro League | 21 | 0 | 1 | 0 | – | – | 22 | 0 |
| Career total | | | | | | | 7 | 0 | | |

- Assist Goals

| Season | Team | Assists |
|---|---|---|
| 10–11 | Saba Qom | 0 |
| 11–12 | Saba Qom | 0 |

== International career ==
Kashi played for Iran at the 2001 FIFA World Youth Championship.
