= Mostafa Mahdavi =

Iranian footballer

Mostapha Mahdavi
Personal information
- Full name: Mostapha Mahdavi
- Place of birth: Iran
- Position: Midfielder

Team information
- Current team: Aluminium Hormozgan

Senior career*
Years	Team	Apps	(Gls)
2009–2010	Sepahan Novin	22	(4)
2010–2011	Foolad Natanz	17	(0)
2011–2013	Naft Tehran	20	(2)
2013	Giti Pasand	2	(0)
2013–2014	Mes Rafsanjan	8	(1)
2014–	Aluminium Hormozgan	5	(0)
- * Club domestic league appearances and goals as of 15 May 2015 (UTC)

Mostapha Mahdavi is an Iranian footballer who plays for Aluminium Hormozgan in the Azadegan League.

== Club career ==
Mahdvi joined Naft Tehran in 2011, after playing the previous two seasons at Sepahan Novin and Foolad Natanz in the Azadegan League.

=== Club career statistics ===
Club performance			League		Cup		Continental		Total	
Season	Club	League	Apps	Goals	Apps	Goals	Apps	Goals	Apps	Goals
Iran			League		Hazfi Cup		Asia		Total	
2009–10	Sepahan Novin	Division 1	22	4		0	-	-		0
2010–11	Foolad Natanz	Division 1	17	0	0	0	-	-	0	0
2011–12	Naft Tehran	Pro League	19	2	1	0	-	-	20	2
2012–13	Naft Tehran	Pro League	1	0	0	0	-	-	1	0
Career total			59	6		0	0	0		0

- Assists

Season	Team	Assists
2011–12	Naft Tehran	1
