= Abbas Pourkhosravani =

Iranian footballer (born 1987)

Personal information
- Full name: Abbas Pourkhosravani
- Date of birth: 30 January 1987 (age 39)
- Place of birth: Sirjan, Iran
- Position: Forward

Team information
- Current team: Padideh Shandiz

Youth career
- 2001–2007: Mes Kerman

Senior career*
Years	Team	Apps	(Gls)
2007–2009	Gol Gohar	52	(23)
2009–2012	Shahin Bushehr	60	(11)
2012–2013	Foolad	24	(2)
2013–	Padideh Shandiz	16	(4)
- * Club domestic league appearances and goals as of 10 May 2013

Abbas Pourkhosravani (Persian: عباس پورخسروانی; born 30 January 1987) is an Iranian footballer who plays as a forward for Padideh Shandiz in the Azadegan League.

== Club career ==
Pourkhosravani joined Shahin Bushehr in 2009 after spending the previous two seasons at Gol Gohar and becoming the top goalscorer of the Azadegan League. He signed a two-year contract with Foolad in May 2012. His contract was terminated at the end of the season after he played only two matches. He joined Padideh Shandiz on 26 July 2013.

=== Club Career Statistics ===
Last Update 10 May 2013

Club performance			League		Cup		Continental		Total	
Season	Club	League	Apps	Goals	Apps	Goals	Apps	Goals	Apps	Goals
Iran			League		Hazfi Cup		Asia		Total	
2007–08	Gol Gohar	Division 1	26	6			–	–		
2008–09	Gol Gohar	Division 1	26	17			–	–		
2009–10	Shahin	Pro League	16	3			–	–	16	3
2010–11	Shahin	Pro League	21	5	2	1	–	–	23	6
2011–12	Shahin	Pro League	29	3	5	1	–	–	34	4
2012–13	Foolad	Pro League	2	0	0	0	–	–	2	0
2013–14	Padideh Shandiz	Division 1	0	0	0	0	–	–	0	0
Career total			120	34			0	0		

- Assist Goals

Season	Team	Assists
09–10	Shahin	2
10–11	Shahin	2
11–12	Shahin	7
12–13	Foolad	0

== Honours ==
=== Club ===
Shahin Bushehr

- Hazfi Cup
  - Runner up (1): 2011–12
