= Hadi Dehghani =

Iranian footballer

Personal information
- Full name: Hadi Dehghani
- Date of birth: 21 March 1990 (age 36)
- Place of birth: Iran
- Position: Midfielder

Team information
- Current team: Aluminium
- Number: 11

Youth career
- –2007: Aluminium

Senior career*
Years	Team	Apps	(Gls)
2008–	Aluminium	95	(18)
2010–2012	→ Malavan (loan)	4	(0)
2016–2017	Gol Gohar Sirjan F.C.	10	(2)
2017–2022	F.C. Shahrdari Bandar Abbas		
2022	Chooka Talesh F.C.		

International career^{‡}
- Iran U20
2013	Iran U23	2	(0)
- * Club domestic league appearances and goals as of 10 May 2013 ‡ National team caps and goals as of 25 March 2013

Hadi Dehghani (Persian: هادی دهقانی; born 21 March 1990) is an Iranian footballer. He played for Aluminium in the Azadegan League.

== Club career ==
Dehghani joined Malavan in 2010 on loan after spending the previous season at Aluminium in the Azadegan League.

Club performance			League		Cup		Continental		Total	
Season	Club	League	Apps	Goals	Apps	Goals	Apps	Goals	Apps	Goals
Iran			League		Hazfi Cup		Asia		Total	
2008–09	Aluminium	Division 1	26	2	1	0	–		27	2
2009–10	Aluminium	Division 1	23	7	0	0	–		23	7
2010–11	Malavan	Pro League	4	0	1	0	–		5	0
2011–12	Malavan	Pro League	0	0	0	0	–		0	0
2012–13	Aluminium	Pro League	18	4	0	0	–		18	4
2013–14	Aluminium	Division 1	0	0	0	0	–		0	0
Career total			53	9	2	0	0	0	55	9

- Assist Goals

Season	Team	Assists
10–11	Malavan	0
11–12	Malavan	0
