= Qeshm Island CSC =

Iranian football club based in Qeshm Island

- Full name: Qeshm Island Football Club
- Founded: 2015; 11 years ago as Shenavar Sazi Qeshm
- Ground: Khalij-e Fars Stadium
- Capacity: 20,000
- Owner: Qeshm Free Zone Organization
- Chairman: Ehsan Osouli
- Manager: Mojtaba Jabbari
- League: Azadegan League
- 2025–26: 12th
Home colours	Away colours	Third colours

Qeshm Island CSC (Persian: باشگاه فوتبال منطقه آزاد قشم, romanized: Bâšgâh-e Futbâl-e Mantaghe-ye Âzâd-e Qeshm), formerly known as Shenavar Sazi Qeshm, is an Iranian football club based in Qeshm Island, Hormozgan province. The club competes in the Azadegan League, the second tier of the Iranian football league system.

The club was founded in 2015 under the name Shenavar Sazi Qeshm. In 2026, following a change in ownership, its football licence was transferred to the Qeshm Free Zone Organization and the club was renamed Qeshm Island.

== History ==
The club was established in 2015 as Shenavar Sazi Qeshm. It first achieved promotion to the Iranian 2nd Division after finishing first in Group 3 of the 2022–23 Iran Football's 3rd Division.

In the 2024–25 season, Shenavar Sazi Qeshm finished first in Group 1 of the Iranian 2nd Division and earned promotion to the Azadegan League.

The club made its debut in the Azadegan League in the 2025–26 season. At the beginning of the season, Davoud Haghdoost was appointed head coach. He was later dismissed and replaced by Farshad Pious.

Shenavar Sazi Qeshm finished the 2025–26 Azadegan League season in 12th place.

In 2026, ownership of the club was transferred to the Qeshm Free Zone Organization, and the club was renamed Qeshm Island.

Ahead of the 2026–27 season, former Esteghlal midfielder Mojtaba Jabbari was appointed head coach.

== Stadium ==
The club plays its home matches at Khalij-e Fars Stadium in Bandar Abbas.The stadium has a capacity of 20,000 spectators.

== Players ==
=== Current squad ===
As of 27 October 2026

Note: Flags indicate national team as defined under FIFA eligibility rules; some limited exceptions apply. Players may hold more than one non-FIFA nationality.

No.	Pos.	Nation	Player
2	DF	IRI	Hossein Sangargir
3	DF	IRI	Hossein Mirza Hosseini
4	DF	IRI	Ramtin Soleimanzadeh
5	DF	IRI	Mohammadreza Khedri
6	MF	IRI	Fardin Bahri
7	MF	IRI	Ali Khabar
8	MF	IRI	Reza Antik
9	FW	IRI	Amin Ghaseminejad (captain)
10	FW	IRI	Seyed Ali Yahyazadeh
11	MF	IRI	Dariush Shojaeian
12	GK	IRI	Mohammadmehdi Razavi
13	DF	IRI	Saleh Rostami
14	MF	IRI	Aref Gholampour
17	DF	IRI	Moein Ranjbarian
20	MF	IRI	Mohammadhossein Chaldavi
22	GK	IRI	Mohammad Faramarzi
23	DF	IRI	Hossein Madadi
27	FW	IRI	Hamidreza Behboudi

No.	Pos.	Nation	Player
50	GK	IRI	Shahab Adeli
54	DF	IRI	Mohammadhosein Delzendehnejad
55	DF	IRI	Amirata Abbaspour
63	DF	IRI	Javad Nasir
66	FW	IRI	Sina Tavoosi
68	FW	IRI	Abdollah Naeimi
70	FW	IRI	Mobin Ranjbari
77	FW	IRI	Alireza Tazike
79	FW	IRI	Reza Khani
84	GK	IRI	Shayan Khademi
88	MF	IRI	Reza Jabbari
90	MF	IRI	Matin Rahmanzadeh
95	DF	IRI	Abolfazl Sokhtanloo
—	FW	IRI	Mohammadreza Kheradnia
—	FW	IRI	Mohammadali Moradizadeh
—	DF	IRI	Diako Mirzaei

== Coaching staff ==
Name	Position
Mojtaba Jabbari	Manager
Hadi Shakouri	Assistant manager
Hossein Badamaki	Assistant manager
Hesam Zeytooninejad	Goalkeeping coach

== Season-by-season record ==
Season	Competition	Position	Notes
2022–23	Iranian 3nd Division	1st in Group 3	Promoted
2024–25	Iranian 2nd Division	1st in Group 1	Promoted
2025–26	Azadegan League	12th	
2026–27	Azadegan League		
