= Aluminium Hormozgan F.C. =

Iranian football club

- Full name: Aluminium Hormozgan Football Club
- Founded: 2006
- Ground: Khalij-e Fars; Bandar Abbas, Iran
- Capacity: 20,000
- Owner: Reza Jabarizadeh
- Chairman: Reza Jabarizadeh
- Manager: Abbas Sarkhab
- League: Football's 2nd Division
- 2015–16: Azadegan League, 20th (Relegated)
Home colours	Away colours

Aluminum Hormozgan Football Club is an Iranian football club founded in 2006. The team is based in Bandar Abbas, Iran and compete in the Azadegan League. In 2008 they became the first club from Hormozgan to play in the Persian Gulf Pro League.

== History ==
Aluminium Hormozgan was founded in 2006 and were promoted to the Iran Pro League in 2012 but were soon relegated to Azadegan League the following season after finishing 15th. They were the first team from the province of Hormozgan to play in the Iran Pro League. Aluminium was relegated to the 2nd Division in 2016.

== Season-by-season ==
The table below chronicles the achievements of Aluminium Hormozgan in various competitions since 2006.

Season	League	Position	Hazfi Cup	Notes
2006–07	3rd Division	1st	Did not qualify	Promoted
2007–08	2nd Division	1st	First round	Promoted
2008–09	Azadegan League	9th	Did not qualify
2009–10	Azadegan League	4th	1/8 Final
2010–11	Azadegan League	2nd	3rd round
2011–12	Azadegan League	1st	Second round	Promoted
2012–13	Iran Pro League	15th	1/16 Final	Relegated
2013–14	Azadegan League	6th	Third round
2014–15	Azadegan League	4th	Third round

== First-team squad ==
Note: Flags indicate national team as defined under FIFA eligibility rules; some limited exceptions apply. Players may hold more than one non-FIFA nationality.

No.	Pos.	Nation	Player
—	GK	IRN	Ali Hassani
—	GK	IRN	Rouzbeh Sinaki
—	DF	IRN	Babak Bidari
—	DF	IRN	Babak Pourgholami
—	DF	IRN	Kaveh Zangian
—	DF	IRN	Iman Salimi
—	MF	IRN	Saeid Rahrou
—	MF	IRN	Masoud Razmpoush

No.	Pos.	Nation	Player
—	MF	IRN	Mohammad Siah
—	FW	IRN	Hamed Amirkhani
—	FW	IRN	Hadi Dehghani
—	FW	IRN	Vahid Khedmatkari
—	FW	IRN	Jafar Bazri
—	FW	IRN	Hakim Hazbaeipour
—	FW	IRN	Mostafa Mahdavi

For recent transfers, see List of Iranian football transfers summer 2015.

== Managers ==
- (Iran) Javad Zarincheh (October 2009)
- (Croatia) Vinko Begović (October 2009 – June 2011)
- (Iran) Akbar Misaghian (June 2011 – February 2013)
- (Iran) Parviz Mazloomi (February 2013 – September 2013)
- (Iran) Abbas Sarkhab (September 2013 – November 2013)
- (Germany) Hans-Jürgen Gede (November 2013 – January 2014)
- (Iran) Majid Namjoo-Motlagh (January 2014 – Aug 2015)
- (Iran) Davood Haghdost (August 2015 –??)
