= Saeid Lotfi (footballer, born 1981) =

Iranian footballer (born 1981)

Saeid Lotfi (born February 25, 1981, in Tehran, Iran) is a former Iranian football player, who played in IPL team Esteghlal and Paykan. He usually played as a defender.

== Biography ==
Lotfi has a handful of appearances for Team Melli. Having a strong physique, he can play in both defense and midfield. Heading and tackling remain his primary skills.

Lotfi has been given few opportunities by Esteghlal F.C. In the IPL 2005/06 season, he only played five full matches for them.

Lotfi played for Iran at the 2001 FIFA World Youth Championship.

Saeid Lotfi
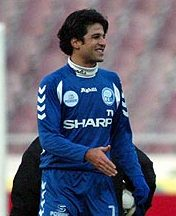

Personal information
- Date of birth: February 25, 1981 (age 45)
- Place of birth: Tehran, Iran
- Height: 1.88 m (6 ft 2 in)
- Position: Defender

Team information
- Current team: Esteghlal B (manager)

Youth career
- Paykan

Senior career*
Years	Team	Apps	(Gls)
2001–2003	Paykan		(1)
2003–2008	Esteghlal		(0)
2008–2010	Paykan	43	(3)
2010–2011	PAS Hamedan		

International career
2001	Iran U20	3	(0)
2002	Iran U23		
2002–2006	Iran	12	(1)

Managerial career
- 2015–2016: Esteghlal U17 (assistant)
- 2018–2019: Shahin Bushehr (assistant)
- 2021: Naft M.I.S (assistant)
- 2024–2025: FC Yasa B
- 2025–: Esteghlal B
Medal record
Representing Iran
Asian Games
Gold medal – first place	2002 Busan	Team competition
- * Club domestic league appearances and goals as of 19 February 2010

== Club career ==
=== Club career statistics ===
As of 12 May 2010

Saeid Lotfi's professional football started from a team called Tehran Metro under the leadership of Sohrab Rahimi. He then joined the team of the Shohadaye Tarasht, who played in the second division of Tehran, with which he experienced the championship and promotion to the first division of Tehran. This defender then continued his game in the selected team of Tehran at the age of 17 and became a student of Ali Dosti-Mehr, who was able to win the national youth championship and spent a year in the Homa team under the leadership of Jamshid Pazira. Saeid Lotfi's presence in the Bank Melli team in 1997 and being invited to the camp of the Iranian U-20 national football team was the result of his one-year presence in the Bank Melli team. Saeid Lotfi's games in the national youth team caused Paykan F.C. and Hamid Alidosti to be noticed in the Azadegan League, and he played for the Tehran club for three seasons from 2000 to 2003 in the Premier League.

His extraordinary performance in Peykan's defensive line caused Lotfi to be noticed by Amir Ghalehnoei, the head coach of Esteghlal at the time, and after joining the Esteghlal football team in the 2003-2004 with this team, he won the Premier League in the 2005–2006 season championship.

After being sidelined for Saeid Lotfi and not playing for Esteghlal, he said goodbye to the fans at the celebration of Esteghlal's victory in the National Cup and returned to his former team, Peykan Football Club, during the two years he spent with Peykan He scored 43 games and three goals for this team (2008–2009), one of which was his former team Esteghlal. In the first half of the 2010–2011 season, he joined the Hamedan Pass Football Club and scored a goal in 12 matches for this team, and this was Saeid Lotfi's last appearance as a player in the Green Rectangle.

Club performance			League		Cup		Continental		Total	
Season	Club	League	Apps	Goals	Apps	Goals	Apps	Goals	Apps	Goals
Iran			League		Hazfi Cup		Asia		Total	
2001–02	Paykan	Persian Gulf Cup		1			-	-		
2002–03	Paykan	Persian Gulf Cup		0			-	-		
2003–04	Esteghlal	Persian Gulf Cup		0			-	-		
2004–05	Esteghlal	Persian Gulf Cup	17	0			-	-		
2005–06	Esteghlal	Persian Gulf Cup	13	0	0	0	-	-	13	0
2006–07	Esteghlal	Persian Gulf Cup	8	0			-	-		
2007–08	Esteghlal	Persian Gulf Cup	9	0			-	-		
2008–09	Paykan	Persian Gulf Cup	21	2			-	-		
2009–10	Paykan	Persian Gulf Cup	22	1			-	-		
Total	Iran			4			0	0		
Career total				4			0	0		

- Assist Goals

Season	Team	Assists
08–09	Paykan	1
09–10	Paykan	0

== National Games ==
=== National Games ===
Ali Dosti-Mehr, the head coach, and Gholam Pirvani coach of the Iranian national youth team, invited Saeid Lotfi to the national team, and the team reached the fourth place in Asia and the 2001 World Cup qualifiers without a loss (in penalties in the semi-finals and ranking game). And were able to experience their second appearance in the Under-21 FIFA World Cup in Argentina after 24 years, However, the Iranian national team did not win in all three matches in the group of death with France, Ghana and Paraguay, and was eliminated with three defeats in the group stage.

After Iran returned from the World Cup and in the friendly match between the Iranian national football team and Peykan, in the 15th minute of the match, Blazevic invited him to the Iranian national adult football team. Saeid Lotfi was a member of the Iranian national football team in the 2002 World Cup qualifiers, when Iran failed to reach the World Cup in Korea and Japan after losing to Ireland.

At the 2002 Asian Games in Busan, where the U-23 national team was led by Branko Ivankovic, who coached both the senior team and Iran's Omid team, Lotfi and the team won the Asian Championship.

Lotfi also scored two goals in 43 games for the Iranian national football team as a defender, one of which was against the team of the Republic of Azerbaijan. Also on display are Lotfi's honors with the Iranian senior football team, the third West Asian team in 2002 in Syria, and the West Asian runner-up in October 2010 in Kuwait under the coaching of Branko Ivankovic. He also won three LG Cups in Morocco in 2002, Tabriz in 2002 and Tehran in 2001 with the Iranian national football team.

== Loss of playing opportunity at Inter Milan ==
=== Loss of playing opportunity at Inter Milan ===
Saeid Lotfi has repeatedly spoken to the media about his frustration with a foot injury and the loss of an opportunity to play for Inter Milan.

He says about the bitter memory of the injury and breaking his leg on the eve of flying to Italy and attending the medical test of Inter Milan Italy : In the friendly match of Omid national team with Tehran pass, which coincided with my captaincy in Omid national team and being fixed in our country's adult team, in two or three minutes of the match, Javad Nekounam broke my leg with a harsh tackle. Of course, I am not upset about this injury, but I did not understand his motive that he had said many times that I had intentionally hit him. This coincided with the sending of an invitation from Inter Milan and the sending of a plane ticket to attend the club's medical test, but that injury prevented me from traveling four days before the flight due to a broken leg. I still have the visa and the ticket that Inter Milan sent me. During the training sessions of the Iranian national football team before the match with Ireland during the qualifying matches for the 2002 World Cup, Michael Walsh, who was an agent, came to watch the match between Hamed Kavianpour and Mehrdad Minavand and sign a contract with them, that night they signed a contract with us. With the coordination of Abbas Torabian, the former head of the Iranian national football team, I was supposed to sign a contract with Inter Milan. "It was as if I lost one of the greatest chances of my life."

== Farewell to football ==
=== Farewell to football ===
After Saeid Lotfi contract with the Hamedan Pass team, one of the Premier League coaches had asked him for money to sign the 30-year-old player, and this caused Lotfi to say goodbye to football very soon. He had said that if an ordinary player and a national team player were to pay both, then it would be better for me to say goodbye to football. A year later, Amir Ghalehnoei called Lotfi and offered to play, but he was so upset that he never returned to the football field and sought coaching.

== Coaching ==
=== Coaching ===
Saeid Lotfi's coaching period began in 2014–2015 with Esteghlal youth team and Ali Samereh assistant. The following year, when Samereh became the head coach of the Omid Esteghlal team, Lotfi took over as the head coach of the Esteghlal youth team. He also received C coaching degree in that year, and then began his collaboration with Mahmoud Fekri in the Iranian First Division Football League and in the Masjed Soleyman Naft team in the 2016–2017 season. At the end of the 2017–2018 season of the first division league, Fekri, with the help of Saeid Lotfi, was able to bring this Khuzestan's team to the Premier League with authority, and in that season, Masjed Soleiman Naft team was at the top of the table for 34 weeks. This coincided with Saeid Lotfi receiving an A coaching degree in Asia. In the 2018–2019 season, he again became Mahmoud Fekri's assistant in the Shahin Bushehr team, which advanced to the Premier League after the team won the Premier League. At the end of the same season, he took charge of Persepolis Pakdasht, and after a few weeks of coaching in this team, at the end of the league, he became Mohsen Ashouri's assistant in Khoshe Talaee team. In the 2020–2021 season of the Premier League, he once again became the assistant of Mahmoud Fekri in the Masjed Soleyman oil team, and after leaving this team, he is now the assistant of Omid Ravankhah in the Saipa team, in the first division of the national football league.

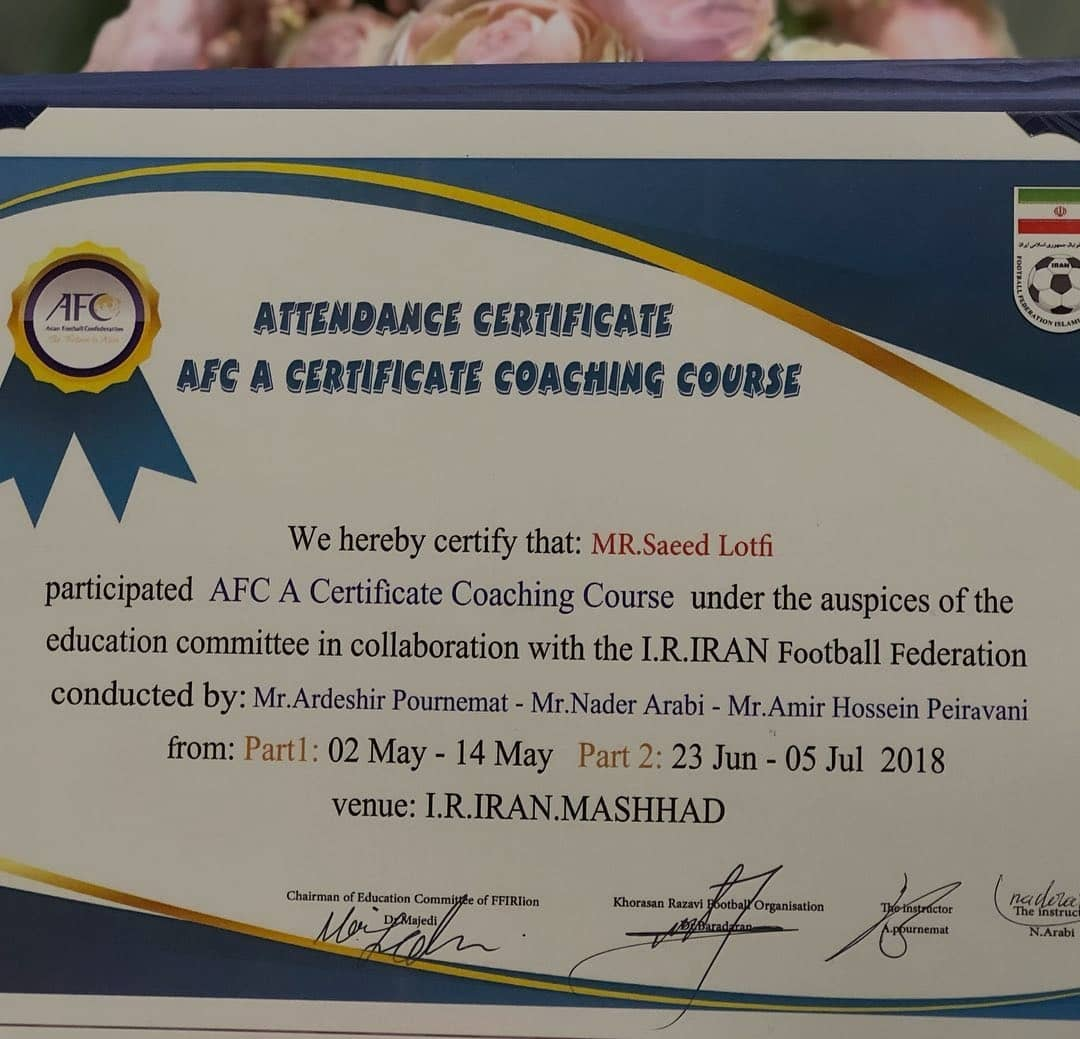
coaching

== Honours ==
Esteghlal:

- Iran Pro League Winner: 1
  - 2005/06 with Esteghlal
