= Abbas Merdasi =

Iranian footballer (born 1982)

Personal information
- Date of birth: 22 December 1982 (age 43)
- Place of birth: Shoshtar, Iran
- Height: 1.84 m (6 ft 1/2 in)
- Positions: Left back; left midfielder

Senior career*
Years	Team	Apps	(Gls)
2006–2007	Keshto Sanat Shushtar		
2007–2008	Shirin Faraz	0	(0)
2008–2009	Shahin	26	(4)
2009–2016	Sanat Naft	138	(3)
2017	Siah Jamegan	1	(0)
- * Club domestic league appearances and goals

Abbas Merdasi (Persian: عباس مرداسی; born 22 December 1982) is an Iranian former footballer.

== Club career ==
In 2009, Merdasi joined Sanat Naft Abadan F.C. after spending the previous season at Pars Bushehr in the Azadegan League.

Club performance			League		Cup		Continental		Total	
Season	Club	League	Apps	Goals	Apps	Goals	Apps	Goals	Apps	Goals
Iran			League		Hazfi Cup		Asia		Total	
2007–08	Shirin Faraz	Pro League	0	0	0	0	-	-	0	0
2008–09	Shahin	Division 1	26	4			-	-	26	4
2009–10	Sanat Naft Abadan F.C.	Division 1	26	1			-	-	26	1
2010–11	Sanat Naft Abadan F.C.	Pro League	30	1	0	0	-	-	30	1
2011–12	Sanat Naft Abadan F.C.	Pro League	32	0	2	0	-	-	34	0
2012–13	Sanat Naft Abadan F.C.	Pro League					-	-		
Career total			114	6	6	2	-	-	116	6

- Assists

Season	Team	Assists
2010–11	Sanat Naft Abadan F.C.	4
2011–12	Sanat Naft Abadan F.C.	5
2012–13	Sanat Naft Abadan F.C.	
