= Esteghlal Zahedan F.C. =

Iranian football club

Esteghlal Zahedan
- Full name: Esteghlal Esteghlal B F.C.
- Nickname: Abihai-ye Sistan (Sistan Blues)
- Founded: 2014; 12 years ago
- Ground: Zahedan Stadium
- Capacity: 15,000
- Owner: PGPIC
- President: Ali Tajernia (acting)
- Manager: Saeid Lotfi
- League: League 2 (Iran)
Home colours	Away colours

Esteghlal Zahedan Football Club (Persian: باشگاه فوتبال استقلال زاهدان, Bašgâh-e Futbâl-e Esteqlâl-e Zahedan), commonly known as Esteghlal Zahedan F.C. or Esteghlal B F.C. , is Second team of Esteghlal F.C. and an Iranian football club based in Zahedan, Iran. The club currently begin its competes from League 2 (Iran) in the 2025–26 season.

== History ==
=== Establishment and early years ===
The team was first established in 2014 and competed in the Iranian Third Division League, hosting rivals in Tehran and Imam Reza Stadium. Esteghlal B Tehran won the Third Division League championship at the end of the 15 season and was promoted to the Iran League 2 the following season.

=== Season 2014–15 ===
Esteghlal B Tehran participated in Group 3 of the Iran League 2 of 2015–16 and after 16 games with 7 wins, 6 draws and 3 losses, earned 20 points and finished league in second rank in its group. The team advanced to the playoffs, but lost to Khyber Khorramabad in two home and away matches with a combined score of 2–1 and did not advance to the Azadegan League.

=== Season 2015_16 ===
Esteghlal B did not perform well this season and played in Group D of the Second Division League of 2015–16 and at the end of 18 matches with 5 wins, 6 draws and 7

losses, earned 16 points and finished sixth in the group.

=== Dissolution ===
The team was quietly dissolved after one season in League 3 (Iran) and two seasons in League 2 (Iran) and was no longer active.

=== Reactivation ===
Following the privatization of Esteghlal in 2024 and a change in management, the club's board of directors, under the orders of the new managers, decided to relaunch the B team. In line with social responsibility and supporting football talents in currently deprived areas, they reestablished the team in Sistan and Baluchestan Province and the city of Zahedan and appointed Hamidreza Rajabi as the head coach of the team and also conducted tests for the team to attract potential talents.

== Personnel ==
Current Managers
Manager	Saeed Lotfi
Assistant Manager	Morteza Kashi
Team Manager	Mohammad Nouri

== Players ==
=== Current squads ===
As of 20 February 2026

==== First Team ====
Note: Flags indicate national team as defined under FIFA eligibility rules; some limited exceptions apply. Players may hold more than one non-FIFA nationality.

No.	Pos.	Nation	Player
2	DF	IRI	Mohammadali Gharajeh ^{U21}
3	DF	IRI	Behnam Asgarkhani
4	DF	IRI	Mehdi Eslami (captain)
5	DF	IRI	Omid Ghorbani
6	MF	IRI	Hesam Baygan ^{U21}
7	FW	IRI	Amirhossein Mahjouri ^{U23}
8	MF	IRI	Mobin Zaman Shoar ^{U23}
11	FW	IRI	Ehsan Afchangi ^{U23}
12	GK	IRI	Mehdi Arta ^{U25}
13	DF	IRI	Ebrahim Maleki ^{U21}
14	DF	IRI	Ali Aghajani ^{U21}
16	FW	IRI	Mehdi Baensaf ^{U21}
19	FW	IRI	Nasser Safa ^{U25}
20	DF	IRI	Navid Baadab ^{U23}
21	FW	IRI	Amirhossein Ghasri ^{U25}

No.	Pos.	Nation	Player
23	DF	IRI	Alireza Asadi ^{U23}
25	MF	IRI	Mohammad Sayyadi
27	FW	IRI	Masoud Banazadeh ^{U21}
30	MF	IRI	Mobin Nasiri ^{U21}
33	GK	IRI	Amirahmad Afsay ^{U23}
77	FW	IRI	Mohammadreza Shaban ^{U21}
80	DF	IRI	Mohammadamin Omidifar
88	FW	IRI	Amirhossein Parniaey ^{U23}
93	FW	IRI	Farshad Janfaza
94	GK	IRI	Abolfazl Abbasi
96	DF	IRI	Ahmad Baharvandi
97	FW	IRI	Shayan Gholami
98	DF	IRI	Pouria Shayesteh

- U21 = Under 21 year player. U23 = Under 23 year player. U25 = Under 25 year quota.
