= Mehdi Eslami =

Mehdi Eslami may refer to:

- Mehdi Eslami (footballer, born 1985), Iranian goalkeeper for Machine Sazi
- Mehdi Eslami (footballer, born 1992), Iranian defender for Esteghlal Ahvaz
