= 2007–08 Iran 2nd Division =

Iran Football's 2nd Division
- Season: 2007–08
- Promoted: Payam Mokhaberat Shiraz; Aluminium Hormozgan; Petroshimi Tabriz; Mehrkam Pars
- Relegated: Sanaye Parchin; Ararat Tehran; Gaz Golestan; Keshto Sannat

The following were the standings of the 2007–08 football season in Iran Football's 2nd Division, which is in fact the third tier of the Iranian football league system.

== League standings ==
=== Group A ===
Pos	Team	Pld	W	D	L	GF	GA	GD	Pts	Promotion or relegation
1	Mehrkam Pars (P)	24	14	5	5	39	21	+18	47	Promotion to Azadegan League
2	Aluminium Hormozgan (P)	24	12	8	4	35	16	+19	44	Promotion to Azadegan League
3	Mes Sarcheshmeh	24	11	8	5	33	16	+17	41	
4	Nirou Moharekeh	24	12	4	8	50	31	+19	40	
5	Daneshgah Azad Lahijan	24	9	8	7	33	35	−2	35	
6	Est. Jonub	24	7	13	4	35	26	+9	34	
7	Per. Borazjan	24	6	13	5	30	18	+12	31	
8	Moghavemat Tehran	24	7	9	8	26	26	0	30	
9	Zob Ahan Ardabil	24	7	6	11	20	34	−14	27	
10	Maziran	24	6	5	13	23	32	−9	23	
11	Foolad Yazd	24	5	6	13	33	41	−8	21	
12	Hepco	24	4	8	12	29	36	−7	20	
13	Gaz Golestan (R)	23	2	9	12	19	49	−30	15	Relegation to 3rd Division
14	Keshto Sannat (R)	0	0	0	0	0	0	0	0	Relegation to 3rd Division

Rules for classification: 1) points; 2) goal difference; 3) number of goals scored.
(P) Promoted; (R) Relegated

=== Group B ===
Pos	Team	Pld	W	D	L	GF	GA	GD	Pts	Promotion or relegation
1	Payam Mokhaberat (P)	26	17	5	4	48	18	+30	56	Promotion to Azadegan League
2	Petroshimi Tabriz (P)	26	15	4	7	41	24	+17	49	Promotion to Azadegan League
3	Sepidrood	26	13	9	4	34	15	+19	48	
4	Sh. Bandar Anzali	26	14	5	7	30	20	+10	47	
5	Sazan Rah	26	13	7	6	36	22	+14	46	
6	Fajr District	26	12	7	7	39	24	+15	43	
7	Naft Tehran	26	11	10	5	30	18	+12	43	
8	Iranjavan	26	11	6	9	35	36	−1	39	
9	Per. Zanjan	26	7	9	10	24	30	−6	30	
10	Aflak Lorestan	27	6	9	12	21	32	−11	27	
11	Deyhim Ahvaz	25	5	8	12	21	47	−26	23	
12	Sanat Gaz	26	4	9	13	26	37	−11	21	
13	Sanaye Parchin (R)	26	3	4	19	17	48	−31	13	Relegation to 3rd Division
14	Ararat (R)	26	4	2	20	16	51	−35	14	Relegation to 3rd Division

Rules for classification: 1) points; 2) goal difference; 3) number of goals scored.
(P) Promoted; (R) Relegated

== Second round ==
=== Championship Semi-finals ===
June 1, Yadegar-e-Emam Stadium, Tabriz

Team 1	Score	Team 2
Payam Mokhaberat Shiraz	0-0(5-4)penalty kick	Aluminium Hormozgan

June 2, Yadegar-e-Emam Stadium, Tabriz

Team 1	Score	Team 2
Petroshimi Tabriz	1-1(6-5)penalty kick	Mehrkam Pars

=== Third place play-off ===
June 5, Yadegar-e-Emam Stadium, Tabriz

Team 1	Score	Team 2
Payam Mokhaberat Shiraz	2-2(1-3)penalty kick	Mehrkam Pars

=== Championship final ===
June 5, Yadegar-e-Emam Stadium, Tabriz

Team 1	Score	Team 2
Petroshimi Tabriz	2-3	Aluminium Hormozgan
