= 2025–26 League 2 (Iran) =

Iranian Football 2nd Division
- Season: 2025–26
- Dates: 27 September 2025 – 26 July 2026
- Champions: Foolad B Khuzestan
- Promoted: Foolad B Khuzestan; Naft Masjed Soleyman; Shahin Bandar Ameri
- Relegated: Omid Tehran; Kia Tehran; Shahrdari Astara; Espad Alvand; Ferdowsi Samen; Pas Hamedan

The 2025–26 season of Iran Football's 2nd Division was the 25th under 2nd Division since its establishment (current format) in 2001. The season featured 19 teams from the 2nd Division 2024–25, three new teams relegated from the 2024–25 Azadegan League: Naft Masjed Soleyman, Shahr Raz Shiraz, Shahrdari Astara, and six new teams promoted from the 3rd Division 2024–25: Setaregan Sorkh Asia, Rakhsh Khodro Tabriz, Aseman Golestan, Malavan Bushehr, Golchin Robat Karim and Shayan Dizel Fars.
These changes has been applied before the season:

Team	Replaced team
Golchin Robat Karim	Esteghlal Zahedan
Nika Pars Chaloos	Bargh Shiraz
YASA Tehran	Arka Alborz
Shahr Raz Shiraz	Fadak Zanjan
Esteghlal Zeydoon	Shahrdari Yasooj

== Teams ==
=== Stadia and locations ===
Locations of clubs in 2023–24 Iran Football's 2nd Division

=== Number of teams by region ===
	Region	Number of teams	Teams
1	Tehran	4	Espad Alvand, KIA, Setaregan Sorkh Asia, Shahin
2	Khuzestan	4	Foolad Novin, Shahrdari Mahshahr, Naft Masjed Soleyman, Esteghlal Zahedan
3	Bushehr	3	Iranjavan Bushehr, Shahin Bandar Ameri, Malavan Bushehr
4	Gilan	3	Chooka Talesh, Sepidrood Rasht, Shahrdari Astara
5	Fars	2	Bargh Shiraz, Shayan Dizel Fars
6	Hormozgan	2	Foolad Hormozgan, Shahrdari Bandar Abbas
7	Alborz	1	Arka
8	Ardabil	1	Ayande Sazan
9	East Azerbaijan	1	Rakhsh Khodro
10	Golestan	1	Aseman
11	Hamedan	1	PAS Hamedan
12	Isfahan	1	Sepahan Novin
13	Markazi	1	Petroshimi Shazand
14	Sistan and Baluchestan	1	Esteghlal Zahedan
15	Yazd	1	Shahid Ghandi Yazd
16	Zanjan	1	Fadak Zanjan

== Seeding ==
The teams were seeded according to their performance in the 2024-25 2nd Division, Azadegan League and 3rd Division. The relegated teams from 2024–25Azadegan League and the loser of the Play-off match were placed in Pot 1. The remaining teams from 2024-25 2nd Division were placed in Pot 2 to Pot 6 according to their final league position. The promoted teams from 2024–25 3rd Division were placed in Pot 6 and 7.

Pot Number	Pot Name	Teams	Comments
Pot 1	Relegated Teams from Azadegan League and 2nd Divions's Play-off loser	Naft Masjed Soleyman (AL:16); Shahr Raz Shiraz (AL:17); Shahrdari Astara (AL:18); Shahid Ghandi Yazd (PL)	
Pot 2	Temas ranked 3rd and 4th in 2nd Division	Foolad Hormozgan (3); Esteghlal Zahedan (3); Shahin Bandar Ameri (4); Shahin Tehran (4)	
Pot 3	Temas ranked 5th and 6th in 2nd Division	Shahrdari Mahshahr (5); Nika Pars Chaloos (Replaced by Bargh Shiraz) (5); Chooka Talesh (6); Shahrdari Bandar Abbas (6)	If Shahr Raz Shiraz (from Pot 1) and Bargh Shiraz are drawn in the same group, Shayan Dizel Fars (from Pot 7) will be placed in the other group automatically. If Shahrdari Astara (from Pot 1) and Chooka Talesh are drawn in the same group, Sepidrood Rasht (from Pot 4) will be placed in the other group automatically. If Naft Masjed Soleyman (from Pot 1) and Esteghlal Zeydoon (from Pot 2) are drawn in the same group, Shahrdari Mahshahr will be placed in the other group automatically.
Pot 4	Temas ranked 7th and 8th in 2nd Division	Kia Tehran (7); Iranjavan Bushehr (7); YASA Tehran (Replaced by Arka Alborz) (8); Sepidrood Rasht (8)	If Shahin Bandar Ameri (from Pot 2) and Iranjavan Bushehr are drawn in the same group, Malavan Bushehr (from Pot 7) will be placed in the other group automatically.
Pot 5	Temas ranked 9th and 10th in 2nd Division	Kesht o Sanat Padyab (9); Pas Hamedan (9); Foolad Novin Ahvaz (10); Espad Tehran (10)	After identifying groups of Naft Masjed Soleyman, Esteghlal Zeydoon and Shahrdari Mahshahr (from Pots 1, 2 and 3 respectively), Foolad Novin will be placed in the group with just one of these teams automatically. If Shahin Tehran (from Pot 2) and KIA Tehran (from Pot 4) are drawn in the same group, Espad Tehran will be placed in the other group automatically.
Pot 6	Temas ranked 11th and 12th	Sepahan Novin Isfahan (11); Petroshimi Shazand (11); Setaregan Sorkh Asia (3D:1); Rakhsh Khodro Tabriz (3D:1)	After identifying groups of Shahin Tehran, KIA Tehran and Espad Tehran (from Pots 2, 4 and 5 respectively), Setaregan Sorkh Asia will be placed in the group with just one of these teams automatically.
Pot 7	Temas promoted from 3rd Division	Aseman Golestan (3D:1); Malavan Bushehr (3D:2); Golchin Robat Karim (Replaced by Esteghlal Zahedan) (3D:2); Shayan Disel Fars (3D:2)	

For the provinces which have three or more teams (Tehran, Khuzestan, Bushehr, Fars and Gilan), a protection rule was applied. For example, from three teams of Hormozgan, two teams should be placed in one group and the third team can not be placed in the same group.
Due to licence transfers of teams, the new location of each team (after confirmation) is considered in the draw.

== League table ==
=== Group A ===
Pos	Team	Pld	W	D	L	GF	GA	GD	Pts	Promotion or relegation
1	Foolad Novin Ahvaz	26	20	5	1	47	15	+32	65	2026–27 Azadegan League & Final Match
2	Shahrdari Mahshahr	26	17	6	3	37	9	+28	57	Promotion Play-off
3	Shahid Ghandi Yazd	26	13	11	2	42	15	+27	50	
4	Bargh Shiraz	26	13	7	6	25	16	+9	46	
5	Rakhsh Khodro Tabriz	26	10	9	7	29	22	+7	39	
6	Foolad Hormozgan	26	10	7	9	37	32	+5	37	
7	Sepidrood Rasht	26	7	11	8	23	22	+1	32	
8	Shahin Tehran	26	7	8	11	20	35	−15	29	
9	Esteghlal Zahedan	26	8	5	13	24	27	−3	29	
10	Kesht o Sanat Padyab	26	6	11	9	27	30	−3	29	
11	Malavan Bushehr	26	7	8	11	22	26	−4	29	
12	Petroshimi Shazand	26	6	6	14	20	39	−19	24	Relegation to 2026–27 3rd Division
13	KIA Tehran	26	3	9	14	27	44	−17	18	Relegation to 2026–27 3rd Division
14	Shahrdari Astara	26	2	3	21	11	59	−48	9	Relegation to 2026–27 3rd Division

Updated to match(es) played on unknown. Source:
Rules for classification: 1) Points; 2) Head-to-head points; 3) Head-to-head goal difference; 4) Head-to-head goals scored; 5) Goal difference; 6) Goals scored; 7) Play-off at neutral venue.
(Note: Head-to-head record is used only after all the matches between the teams in question have been played).

=== Group B ===
Pos	Team	Pld	W	D	L	GF	GA	GD	Pts	Promotion or relegation
1	Naft Masjed Soleyman	26	14	9	3	46	21	+25	51	2026–27 Azadegan League & Final Match
2	Shahin Bandar Ameri	26	14	8	4	28	10	+18	50	Promotion Play-off
3	Dena Yasuj	26	13	8	5	25	15	+10	47	
4	Sepahan Novin Isfahan	26	10	11	5	25	20	+5	41	
5	Shahrdari Bandar Abbas	26	10	7	9	24	19	+5	37	
6	Arka City	26	8	13	5	22	18	+4	37	
7	Chooka Talesh	26	8	7	11	24	27	−3	31	
8	Iranjavan Bushehr	26	4	17	5	19	23	−4	29	
9	Shayan Diesel Fars	26	6	11	9	22	30	−8	29	
10	Aseman Golestan	26	7	7	12	23	31	−8	28	
11	Setaregan Sorkh Asia	26	5	12	9	16	22	−6	27	
12	Spad Alvand Tehran	26	7	6	13	27	31	−4	27	Relegation to 2026–27 3rd Division
13	Etehad Torghabe	26	6	8	12	18	31	−13	26	Relegation to 2026–27 3rd Division
14	Pas Hamedan	26	5	6	15	16	37	−21	21	Relegation to 2026–27 3rd Division

Updated to match(es) played on unknown. Source:
Rules for classification: 1) Points; 2) Head-to-head points; 3) Head-to-head goal difference; 4) Head-to-head goals scored; 5) Goal difference; 6) Goals scored; 7) Play-off at neutral venue.
(Note: Head-to-head record is used only after all the matches between the teams in question have been played).

== Results ==
=== Group A ===
Home \ Away	KIA	RKT	KSP	MAB	SHN	PTS	SHM	FOL	ESZ	BSH	SHA	SRR	FOH	SGY
KIA Tehran	—													
Rakhsh Khodro Tabriz		—												
Kesht o Sanat Padyab			—											
Malavan Bushehr				—										
Shahin Tehran					—									
Petroshimi Shazand						—								
Shahrdari Mahshahr							—							
Foolad Novin Ahvaz								—						
Esteghlal Zahedan									—					
Bargh Shiraz										—				
Shahrdari Astara											—			
Sepidrood Rasht												—		
Foolad Hormozgan													—	
Shahid Ghandi Yazd														—

Updated to match(es) played on unknown. Source:
Legend: Blue = home team win; Yellow = draw; Red = away team win.

=== Group B ===
Home \ Away	SEP	ARA	IJB	SHB	SSA	SPA	SHY	NMS	SDF	FAZ	ASG	CHT	SBA	PAH
Sepahan Novin Isfahan	—													
Arka Alborz		—												
Iranjavan Bushehr			—											
Shahin Bandar Ameri				—										
Setaregan Sorkh Asia					—									
Spad Alvand Tehran						—								
Shahrdari Yasooj							—							
Naft Masjed Soleyman							1–1	—						
Shayan Disel Fars									—					
Fadak Zanjan										—				
Aseman Golestan											—			
Chooka Talesh												—		
Sh. Bandar Abbas													—	
Pas Hamedan														—

Updated to match(es) played on unknown. Source:
Legend: Blue = home team win; Yellow = draw; Red = away team win.

== See also ==
- 2025–26 Persian Gulf Pro League
- 2025–26 Azadegan League
- 2025–26 3rd Division
- 2025–26 4th Division
- 2025–26 Hazfi Cup
- 2025 Iranian Super Cup
