= Mojtaba Jabbari =

Iranian footballer (born 1983)

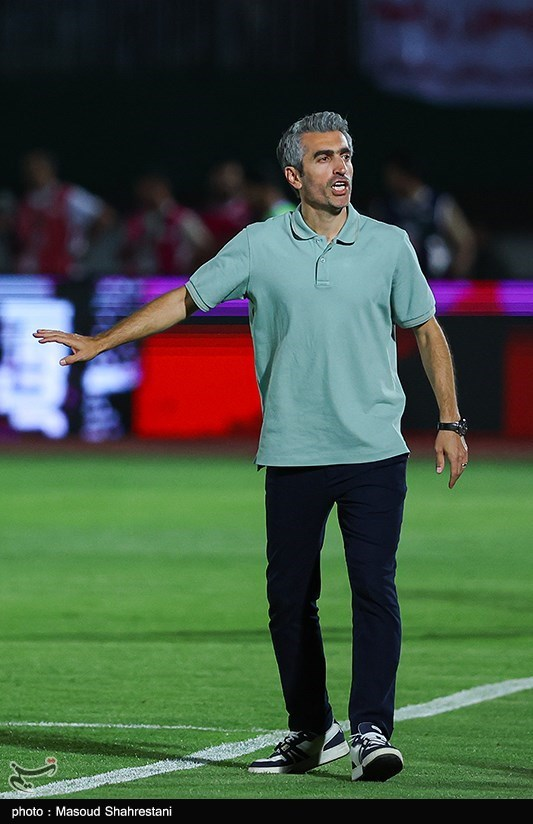
- Jabbari managing Esteghlal in 2025

Personal information
- Date of birth: 16 June 1983 (age 43)
- Place of birth: Robat Karim, Tehran, Iran
- Height: 1.82 m (5 ft 11 1/2 in)
- Position: Attacking midfielder

Team information
- Current team: Qeshm Island (manager)

Youth career
- 1995–1999: Rah Ahan
- 1999–2002: Esteghlal

Senior career*
Years	Team	Apps	(Gls)
2002–2005	Aboomoslem	55	(7)
2005–2013	Esteghlal	134	(26)
2013	Sepahan	5	(0)
2013–2017	Al Ahli	77	(15)
2017–2018	Esteghlal	4	(0)
Total		275	(48)

International career
2005	Iran B	6	(2)
2005–2014	Iran	31	(3)

Managerial career
- 2019: Gol Gohar (assistant)
- 2022: Niroye Zamini
- 2025: Esteghlal (assistant)
- 2025: Esteghlal (caretaker)
- 2025–2026: Mes Rafsanjan
- 2026–: Qeshm Island
- * Club domestic league appearances and goals

Mojtaba Jabbari (Persian: مجتبی جباری, pronounced [modʒtʰæˈbɒː dʒæbbɒːˈɾiː]; born 16 June 1983) is an Iranian football coach and former player who played as an attacking midfielder. He is the manager of Qeshm Island.

Jabbari spent most of his playing career with Esteghlal, where he won three Iran Pro League titles and two Hazfi Cup titles. He also played for Aboomoslem, Sepahan, and Al Ahli in Qatar. At international level, he represented the Iran national team between 2005 and 2014, earning 31 caps and scoring three goals.

After retiring as a player, Jabbari began his coaching career in 2019. He worked as an assistant at Gol Gohar and later managed Niroye Zamini. In 2025, he joined the Esteghlal coaching staff before becoming caretaker manager in April. He led Esteghlal to victory in the Hazfi Cup in the 2024–25 season, defeating Malavan 1–0 in the final. He subsequently managed Mes Rafsanjan and, in 2026, was appointed manager of Qeshm CSC.

== Club career ==
=== Early years ===
Due to his father's career as an employee for Islamic Republic of Iran Railways, Jabbari began his club football playing for Rah Ahan. His coach at the club, Ahadi soon moved to Esteghlal youth team, and took Jabbari with him. To gain experience, he was loaned out to Aboomoslem. He was part of the team that went to final of the Hazfi Cup with Aboomoslem.

=== Esteghlal ===
He rejoined Esteghlal in the 2005–06 season. He helped the team win the championship that season.

In 2006, he got injured and was not ready to play until the second half of 2006–07 season, in which he made a comeback in a 20-minute appearance vs. Saipa on January 27, 2007. He is back to the club's starting lineup for the 2007–08 season. He was a key player in Esteghlal's Hazfi Cup final victory Pegah scoring and assisting a goal in the 3–0 win on a day which he lost his father. He scored Esteghlal's first goal of the 2008–09 season in a 2–0 victory over former club Aboomoslem.

Jabbari was on trial with Grenoble Foot 38 of French Ligue 1 but was not signed as Grenoble Foot 38 ran into financial problems. He had some problems with the club coach after the first AFC Champions League and was fined by the club. He started the 2009–10 season as usual with injury where he was out for most of the season and only featured in few matches but in 2010–11 season, he was able to become one of the regular players. He scored a goal in the Tehran derby on September 16, 2011, and was selected as best player of the match. He won the Hazfi Cup for the second time in this season. He also helped Esteghlal to win league title in 2012–13 season after four years.

=== Sepahan ===
After multiple rather harsh criticism he had made against the management of the club over the past few years, in early July 2013 after some unsuccessful preliminary negotiations to extend his contract the club's chairman decided not to move forward till he officially apologized for his remarks. At the same time, Jabbari claimed that he had been waiting for an apology from the club for about 2 weeks. Eventually no apology was exchanged and on July 6, 2013, he signed a one-year contract with Sepahan. After playing just five games for Sepahan, he was fired by Sepahan coach Zlatko Kranjčar and was banned from training.

=== Al Ahli ===
On October 1, 2013, Jabbari signed a one-year loan contract with Al Ahli of Qatar Stars League. In January 2014 Jabbari completed a permanent move to Al Ahli, he signed a two-year, $3.5 million contract. He finished the season with scoring five goals and assisting six times in twenty one matches.

Jabbari scored the first two goals of the 2014–15 season in Al Ahli's 4–1 win over Al-Sailiya. He also assisted two goals in Al Ahli's second game against Qatar SC. On September 3, 2014, Jabbari was named as August's Player of the Month. The award makes him the first ever winner in Qatar Stars League's history. On March 10, 2015, Al Ahli extended Jabbari's contract until 2017.

=== Return to Esteghlal ===
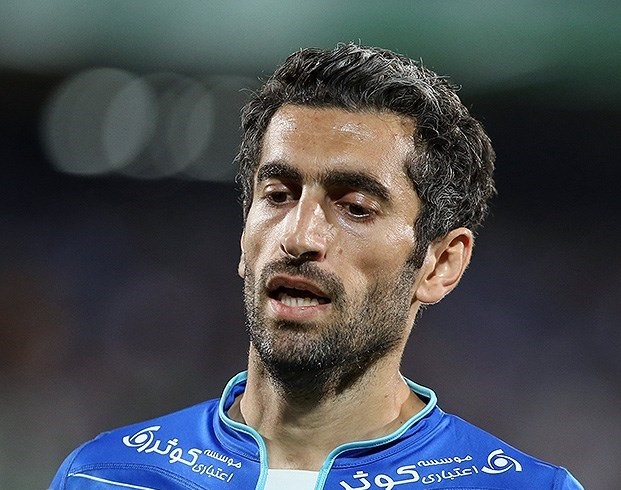
Jabbari playing for Esteghlal in 2017

Jabbari returned to Esteghlal after four years in July 2017. After a while he was in trouble with club chairman, Reza Eftekhari which lead to his departure from the team after four games in Iran pro league. He announced his retirement on 10 July 2018.

=== Club career statistics ===
Last update: July 17, 2018

Club performance			League		Cup		Continental		Total	
Season	Club	League	Apps	Goals	Apps	Goals	Apps	Goals	Apps	Goals
Iran			League		Hazfi Cup		Asia		Total	
2002–03	Aboomoslem	Pro League	13	2	1	0	–	–	14	2
2003–04	Aboomoslem	Pro League	15	0	0	0	–	–	15	0
2004–05	Aboomoslem	Pro League	27	5	5	0	–	–	32	5
2005–06	Esteghlal	Pro League	24	5	0	0	–	–	24	5
2006–07	Esteghlal	Pro League	2	0	0	0	–	–	2	0
2007–08	Esteghlal	Pro League	27	1	6	1	–	–	33	2
2008–09	Esteghlal	Pro League	22	8	0	0	1	0	23	8
2009–10	Esteghlal	Pro League	1	0	0	0	2	0	3	0
2010–11	Esteghlal	Pro League	18	2	2	2	5	0	25	4
2011–12	Esteghlal	Pro League	24	10	2	2	5	1	31	13
2012–13	Esteghlal	Pro League	16	0	4	0	8	0	28	0
2017–18	Esteghlal	Pro League	4	0	0	0	0	0	4	0
2013–14	Sepahan	Pro League	5	0	0	0	0	0	5	0
Qatar			League		Emir Cup		Asia		Total	
2013–14	Al Ahli	Stars League	21	5	2	3	–	–	23	8
2014–15	Al Ahli	Stars League	21	6	0	0	–	–	21	6
2015–16	Al Ahli	Stars League	24	3	0	0	–	–	24	3
2016–17	Al Ahli	Stars League	11	1	0	0	–	–	11	1
Career total			275	48	22	8	21	1	318	57

- Assist goals

Season	Team	Assists
05–06	Esteghlal	7
07–08	Esteghlal	8
08–09	Esteghlal	4
10–11	Esteghlal	3
11–12	Esteghlal	9
12–13	Esteghlal	4
13–14	Sepahan	1
13–14	Al Ahli	6
14–15	Al Ahli	7

== International career ==
While playing for Aboomoslem, Jabbari was called up to the national team camps several times, but was not able to create a place for himself in the team. He also played for Iran B team in the Islamic Solidarity Games held in Saudi Arabia. Soon after he was called up to the national team again, and made his international debut versus Bosnia on February 2, 2005. After his impressive displays the following season in Esteghlal, he was a constant call up to the national team and there was some chance that he might have been a starter. He played the last match of Iran against Japan in the 2006 FIFA World Cup qualification then he was called up for Iran's preliminary World Cup 2006 squad, but missed the tournament as he was injured during training in Switzerland.

In April 2014, he announced he would be retiring from the national team.

=== International goals ===
Scores and results list Iran's goal tally first.

#	Date	Venue	Opponent	Score	Result	Competition
1	October 11, 2011	Azadi Stadium, Tehran	Bahrain	2–0	6–0	2014 FIFA World Cup qualification
2	November 11, 2011	National Stadium, Manama	Bahrain	1–1	1–1	2014 FIFA World Cup qualification
3	November 15, 2011	Gelora Bung Karno Stadium, Jakarta	Indonesia	2–0	4–1	2014 FIFA World Cup qualification

== Personal life ==
Jabbari's family is Iranian Azerbaijani from the Ardabil city of Ardabil Province.

== Honours ==
=== Club ===
Aboomoslem

- Hazfi Cup: Runner-up 2004–05

Esteghlal

- Iran Pro League: 2005–06, 2008–09, 2012–13, Runner-up 2010–11
- Hazfi Cup: 2007–08, 2011–12

=== Manager ===
Esteghlal

- Hazfi Cup: 2024–25

=== National ===
- Islamic Solidarity Games: 2005 (Bronze Medal)

=== Individual ===
- Iran Pro League top goal assistant: 2007–08
- Qatar Stars League Player of the Month: August 2014
