= Omid Ghorbani =

Iranian footballer

Personal information
- Full name: Omid Ghorbani
- Date of birth: 12 February 1993 (age 33)
- Place of birth: Karaj, Iran
- Position: Left back

Team information
- Current team: Saba Qom
- Number: 26

Youth career
- –2014: Badr Bandar Kong

Senior career*
Years	Team	Apps	(Gls)
2013–2014	Badr Bandar Kong	11	(1)
2014–	Saba Qom	6	(0)

International career^{‡}
2014–2016	Iran U23	1	(0)
- * Club domestic league appearances and goals as of 27 December 2014 ‡ National team caps and goals as of 15 January 2014

Omid Ghorbani (Persian: امید قربانی); is an Iranian defender who currently plays for the Iranian football club Saba Qom in the Iran Pro League.

== Club career ==
=== Badr Bandar Kong ===
He started his career with Badr Bandar Kong from youth levels. He made his debut for Badr Bandar Kong on 25 September 2013 against Mes Rafsanjan as a starter.

=== Saba Qom ===
He joined Saba Qom on 2 June 2014 with a 3-year contract. He made his debut against Zob Ahan on 31 July 2014 as a starter.

== Club career statistics ==
As of 27 December 2014.

Club	Division	Season	League		Hazfi Cup		Asia		Total	
Club	Division	Season	Apps	Goals	Apps	Goals	Apps	Goals	Apps	Goals
Badr Bandar Kong	Division 1	2013–14	11	1	0	0	–	–	11	1
Saba Qom	Pro League	2014–15	6	0	1	0	–	–	7	0
Career Totals			17	1	1	0	0	0	18	1

== International career ==
=== U23 ===
He was invited to the Iran U-23 training camp by Nelo Vingada to prepare for Incheon 2014 and 2016 AFC U-22 Championship (Summer Olympic qualification).
