= 2008–09 Azadegan League =

18th season of Azadegan League

Azadegan League
- Season: 2008–09
- Champions: Steel Azin; 1st Azadegan League title Tractor Sazi; 1st Azadegan League title
- Promoted: Steel Azin; Tractor Sazi; Shahin Bushehr
- Relegated: Homa; Shahrdari Zanjan; Machine Sazi; Deyhim Ahvaz
- Matches: 364
- Goals: 843 (2.32 per match)
- Top goalscorer: Abbas Porkhosravani (17 goals)
- Biggest home win: Aluminium Arak 7–0 Kowsar Lorestan (25 December 2008)
- Biggest away win: Shahin Ahvaz 0–4 Niroye Zamini (30 November 2008)
- Highest scoring: Gol Gohar 3–5 Petroshimi Tabriz (14 November 2008); Nassaji 3–5 Steel Azin (7 June 2009)
- Highest attendance: 20,000; Tractor Sazi – Aluminium Hormozgan (8 June 2009)
- Lowest attendance: 0 (spectator ban); Sanat Naft – Sh. Bandar Abbas (20 November 2008); Damash Lorestan – Machine Sazi (25 December 2008); Shahin Ahvaz – Shirin Faraz (25 December 2008); Sh. Tabriz – Nassaji (5 March 2009); Aluminium Hormozgan – Machine Sazi (13 April 2009); Petroshimi Tabriz – Moghavemat Mersad (20 May 2009); Shamoushak – Niroye Zamini (26 May 2009)
- Total attendance: 1,097,750
- Average attendance: 3,075

The 2008–09 Azadegan League was the 18th season of the Azadegan League and eight as the second highest division since its establishment in 1991. The season featured 22 teams from the 2007–08 Azadegan League, two new teams relegated from the 2007–08 Persian Gulf Cup (Sanat Naft and Shirin Faraz) and four new teams promoted from the 2007–08 2nd Division (Aluminium Hormozgan as champions and Mehrkam Pars, Payam Mokhaberat and Petroshimi Tabriz). Sanaye Arak changed their name to Aluminium Arak. The league started on 23 October 2008 and ended on 8 June 2009. Steel Azin and Tractor Sazi won the Azadegan League title for the first time in their history. Steel Azin, Tractor Sazi and Shahin Bushehr got promoted to the Persian Gulf Cup.

== Standings ==
=== Group A ===
Pos	Team	Pld	W	D	L	GF	GA	GD	Pts	Promotion or relegation
1	Steel Azin (C, P)	26	17	4	5	49	31	+18	55	Promotion to 2009–10 PGC
2	Sh. Tabriz	26	13	9	4	39	25	+14	48	Azadegan League 2008–09 Play Off
3	Petroshimi Tabriz	26	13	7	6	43	32	+11	46	
4	Aluminium Arak	26	12	9	5	37	23	+14	45	
5	Gol Gohar	26	10	9	7	33	30	+3	39	
6	Sepahan Novin	26	10	8	8	35	31	+4	38	
7	Sanat Naft	26	7	12	7	28	27	+1	33	
8	Kowsar Lorestan	26	8	9	9	20	29	−9	33	
9	Mehrkam Pars	26	7	10	9	31	34	−3	31	
10	Moghavemat Mersad	26	6	8	12	27	34	−7	26	
11	Sh. Bandar Abbas	26	6	7	13	26	33	−7	25	
12	Nassaji Mazandaran	26	5	10	11	25	36	−11	25	
13	Homa (R)	26	4	9	13	23	32	−9	21	Relegation to 2009–10 2nd Division
14	Sh. Zanjan (R)	26	3	11	12	19	33	−14	20	Relegation to 2009–10 2nd Division

Updated to match(es) played on 7 June 2009. Source: http://www.iplstats.com
Rules for classification: 1) points; 2) goal difference; 3) number of goals scored.
(C) Champions; (P) Promoted; (R) Relegated

=== Group B ===
Pos	Team	Pld	W	D	L	GF	GA	GD	Pts	Promotion or relegation
1	Tractor Sazi (C, P)	26	16	6	4	41	18	+23	54	Promotion to 2009–10 Persian Gulf Cup
2	Shahin Bushehr (P)	26	16	5	5	31	20	+11	53	Azadegan League 2008–09 Play Off
3	Mes Rafsanjan	26	13	7	6	42	20	+22	46	
4	Damash Lorestan	26	10	10	6	26	19	+7	40	
5	Tarbiat Yazd	26	9	11	6	32	24	+8	38	
6	Niroye Zamini	26	10	8	8	25	19	+6	38	
7	Shirin Faraz	26	8	12	6	30	25	+5	36	
8	Payam Mokhaberat	26	10	4	12	33	30	+3	34	
9	Aluminium Hormozgan	26	7	12	7	30	24	+6	33	
10	Etka Gorgan	26	8	9	9	37	30	+7	33	
11	Shamoushak	26	6	9	11	20	25	−5	27	
12	Shahin Ahvaz	26	5	6	15	20	50	−30	21	
13	Machine Sazi (R)	26	5	5	16	21	49	−28	20	Relegation to 2009–10 Iran Football's 2nd Division
14	Deyhim Ahvaz (R)	26	4	6	16	20	51	−31	18	Relegation to 2009–10 Iran Football's 2nd Division

Updated to match(es) played on 7 June 2009. Source: http://www.lig1.ir
Rules for classification: 1) points; 2) goal difference; 3) number of goals scored.
(C) Champions; (P) Promoted; (R) Relegated

== Results table ==
=== Group A ===
Last updated June 7, 2009

Home \ Away	GOL	HOM	KOW	MEH	MMS	NSJ	PET	SNA	ALU	SPN	SHB	SHT	SHZ	STL
Gol Gohar		1–0	2–0	2–2	4–0	1–1	3–5	0–0	2–1	0–2	1–0	1–0	1–0	1–3
Homa	2–2		0–0	2–0	1–1	1–1	0–1	2–3	0–0	0–0	0–1	1–2	2–1	0–1
Kowsar Lorestan	0–1	2–1		1–1	2–0	3–2	1–0	0–0	0–3	0–0	0–0	0–1	1–0	0–1
Mehrkam Pars	1–2	1–1	1–2		1–1	1–0	0–1	2–0	0–0	1–0	3–1	1–1	1–0	1–1
Moghavemat Mersad	1–1	4–1	1–2	2–1		4–3	0–0	1–1	1–1	0–1	1–1	4–1	1–1	4–0
Nassaji Mazandaran	1–0	0–0	0–0	1–1	1–0		1–3	0–0	0–0	3–1	1–0	0–0	3–1	3–5
Petroshimi Tabriz	1–2	0–1	1–0	4–1	2–0	1–0		1–1	1–1	2–0	2–1	0–0	2–2	2–2
Sanat Naft Abadan F.C.	3–1	1–2	2–2	2–2	1–0	0–0	3–0		1–1	0–0	2–2	1–0	1–0	0–1
Aluminium Arak	1–0	2–1	7–0	3–2	0–1	3–1	3–3	1–0		1–0	1–1	3–1	1–0	1–3
Sepahan Novin	2–2	2–1	2–1	1–0	1–0	1–1	2–4	1–2	0–1		2–1	1–1	1–1	1–2
Sh. Bandar Abbas	1–2	2–1	0–1	0–2	2–0	2–1	0–1	2–2	1–2	1–1		1–4	2–0	2–1
Sh. Tabriz	0–0	1–0	1–0	2–2	2–0	3–0	2–2	2–0	1–0	2–2	1–0		3–3	3–1
Sh. Zanjan	1–1	0–0	2–2	0–1	2–0	0–0	1–0	1–0	0–0	0–3	0–0	1–3		1–1
Steel Azin	1–0	3–2	0–0	0–1	1–0	3–1	4–1	3–2	3–0	3–2	2–1	1–2	3–1	

Source: http://lig1.ir/
Legend: Blue = home team win; Yellow = draw; Red = away team win.

=== Group B ===
Last updated June 7, 2009

Home \ Away	ALH	DAM	DEY	ETK	MST	MSR	NRO	PMS	SAA	SHB	SHM	SFZ	TAR	TRK
Aluminium Hormozgan		1–1	0–0	2–1	3–0	2–2	1–1	2–1	1–0	1–0	1–1	1–1	1–1	0–0
Damash Lorestan	0–0		2–1	2–1	3–0	1–0	0–0	2–1	0–0	2–0	1–1	1–1	1–1	0–1
Deyhim Ahvaz	1–1	0–1		1–3	2–2	1–1	0–0	0–1	3–0	1–3	2–1	2–1	1–2	1–3
Etka Gorgan	1–1	1–2	4–0		2–2	1–0	2–0	0–1	5–0	1–1	2–1	1–1	0–0	2–3
Machine Sazi	1–3	1–0	2–0	0–1		3–1	0–3	1–4	2–2	0–0	1–1	1–0	2–1	0–1
Mes Rafsanjan	1–0	1–2	3–0	2–0	5–0		1–0	4–2	4–0	4–0	2–0	2–0	1–0	0–0
Niroye Zamini	1–0	2–2	1–1	0–0	2–0	0–1		1–1	1–0	1–1	1–0	1–1	0–1	1–0
Payam Mokhaberat	1–0	0–1	4–0	1–1	2–0	1–1	2–3		3–0	0–3	2–1	1–2	1–0	0–1
Shahin Ahvaz	4–3	3–2	1–0	1–2	2–1	1–1	0–4	0–1		0–1	1–0	0–3	0–1	1–4
Shahin Bushehr	2–0	1–0	2–0	3–2	2–1	1–0	2–1	1–0	1–1		1–0	2–1	1–0	1–0
Shamoushak	0–0	0–0	2–1	1–1	1–0	0–1	1–0	1–0	2–0	0–1		2–2	1–1	0–0
Shirin Faraz	0–1	1–0	1–2	1–1	1–0	0–0	2–0	1–1	1–1	1–0	2–1		0–0	1–1
Tarbiat Yazd	1–0	0–0	4–0	2–1	3–0	3–3	0–1	2–3	1–1	1–1	1–0	2–2		2–2
Tractor Sazi	2–0	1–0	5–0	1–0	4–1	2–1	1–0	1–0	3–1	2–0	1–2	1–3	1–1	

Source: http://lig1.ir
Legend: Blue = home team win; Yellow = draw; Red = away team win.

== Player statistics ==
=== Top goalscorers ===
17

- (Iran) Abbas Porkhosravani (Gol Gohar)

==== Group A ====
17

- (Iran) Abbas Porkhosravani (Gol Gohar)

11

- (Iran) Mostafa Shojaei (Sepahan Novin)
- (Iran) Akbar Saghiri (Petroshimi Tabriz F.C.)

9

- (Iran) Rouhollah Arab (Sanat Naft Abadan F.C.)

==== Group B ====
14

- (Iran) Mohammad Ahmadpouri (Shirin Faraz)

12

- (Iran) Nima Ghavidel (Niroye Zamini)
- (Iran) Mohammad Ebrahimi (Mokhaberat Shiraz)

9

- (Iran) Amir Mohebi (Tractor Sazi F.C.)

== Play Off ==
First leg to be played June 15, 2009; return leg to be played June 22, 2009

Team 1	Agg.	Team 2	1st leg	2nd leg
Shahrdari Tabriz F.C.	2-3	Shahin Bushehr F.C.	2-2	0-1

=== First leg ===
June 15, 2009
17:00

Shahrdari Tabriz	2 – 2	Shahin Bushehr
Saeed Daghighi 16' 42' (pen.)		Saeed Pirsarandib 37' 50'

Takhti Stadium, Tabriz
Attendance: 20,000
Referee: Hedayat Mombini

=== Return leg ===
June 22, 2009
17:30

Shahin Bushehr	1 – 0	Shahrdari Tabriz
Abbas Mardasi 63'

Shahid Beheshti Stadium, Bushehr
Attendance: 10,000
Referee: Masoud Moradi

== Attendances ==
=== Average home attendances ===
Pos	Team	Total	High	Low	Average	Change
1	Tractor Sazi	122,000	20,000	3,000	9,385	n/a
2	Damash Lorestan	103,000	10,000	0	8,583	n/a
3	Shahin Bushehr	103,000	12,000	4,000	7,923	n/a
4	Nassaji	93,000	15,000	1,000	7,154	n/a
5	Sanat Naft Abadan F.C.	82,700	12,000	0	6,892	−44.9%
6	Kowsar Lorestan	78,500	10,000	1,000	6,038	n/a
7	Sh. Tabriz	63,500	12,000	0	5,292	n/a
8	Aluminium Arak	68,000	15,000	1,000	5,231	n/a
9	Tarbiat Yazd	57,000	10,000	2,000	4,385	n/a
10	Machine Sazi	50,000	10,000	1,000	3,846	n/a
11	Etka Gorgan	36,000	5,000	500	2,769	n/a
12	Mes Rafsanjan	34,700	5,000	200	2,669	n/a
13	Aluminium Hormozgan	25,500	3,000	0	2,125	n/a
14	Gol Gohar	25,000	3,000	1,000	1,923	n/a
15	Sh. Zanjan	24,750	5,000	50	1,904	n/a
16	Shirin Faraz	22,500	4,000	500	1,731	−63.6%
17	Sepahan Novin	20,000	5,000	300	1,538	n/a
18	Sh. Bandar Abbas	17,800	3,000	300	1,369	n/a
19	Shamoushak	15,600	3,000	0	1,300	n/a
20	Steel Azin	8,750	4,000	100	673	n/a
21	Mehrkam Pars	7,600	2,000	100	585	n/a
22	Shahin Ahvaz	6,550	4,000	0	546	n/a
23	Moghavemat Mersad	7,000	4,000	100	538	n/a
24	Deyhim Ahvaz	6,000	1,500	100	462	n/a
25	Homa	5,400	1,000	200	415	n/a
26	Payam Mokhaberat	5,300	1,000	100	408	n/a
27	Petroshimi Tabriz	4,450	800	0	371	n/a
28	Niroye Zamini	4,150	2,000	50	319	n/a
	League total	1,097,750	15,000	0	3,075	n/a

Updated to games played on 8 June 2009
Source: iplstats.com
Notes:
Matches with spectator bans are not included in average attendances
Sanat Naft and Shirin Faraz played last season in Persian Gulf Cup
Aluminium Hormozgan, Mehrkam Pars, Payam Mokhaberat and Petroshimi Tabriz played last season in Iran 2nd Division
Sanaye Arak changed their name into Aluminium Arak

=== Highest attendances ===
Rank	Home team	Score	Away team	Attendance	Date	Week	Stadium
1	Tractor Sazi	2–0	Aluminium Hormozgan	20,000	8 June 2009	26	Sahand
2	Aluminium Arak	1–3	Steel Azin	15,000	15 March 2009	17	Imam Khomeini
2	Nassaji	1–0	Gol Gohar	15,000	21 April 2009	20	Vatani
2	Tractor Sazi	2–0	Shahin Bushehr	15,000	28 April 2009	21	Sahand
2	Nassaji	0–0	Shahrdari Tabriz	15,000	7 May 2009	22	Vatani
2	Nassaji	1–0	Shahrdari Bandar Abbas	15,000	21 May 2009	24	Vatani
3	Sanat Naft	3–1	Gol Gohar	12,000	22 January 2009	13	Takhti Abadan
3	Shahrdari Tabriz	2–2	Mehrkam Pars	12,000	13 March 2009	17	Sahand
3	Shahin Bushehr	3–2	Etka Gorgan	12,000	21 May 2009	24	Shahid Beheshti
3	Shahrdari Tabriz	1–0	Aluminium Arak	12,000	8 June 2009	26	Sahand

Notes:
Updated to games played on 8 June 2009. Source: iplstats.com

== See also ==
- 2008–09 Persian Gulf Cup
- 2008–09 Iran Football's 2nd Division
- 2008–09 Hazfi Cup
- 2008–09 Iranian Futsal Super League
