= Petrochimi Tabriz F.C. =

Iranian football club

Tabriz petrochemical پتروشيمي تبريز
- Full name: Tabriz Petrochemical Football Club
- Nicknames: Sky Blues (Persian: اسماني پوشان); Azarbaijan's Petro
- Short name: petro
- Founded: 2001
- Dissolved: 2010
- Ground: Bagh Shomal Stadium; Tabriz
- Capacity: 20,000
- Chairman: (Iran) Mohammad Esmaeil Delbari
- Head Coach: (North Macedonia) Zoran Smileski
- League: Azadegan League
- 2009–10: Azadegan League Group 2, 12th
Home colours	Away colours

Petrochimi Tabriz Football Club (Persian: پتروشيمي تبريز باشگاه فوتبال) was an Iranian football club based in Tabriz, Azerbaijan Province. They were founded in 2001 and dissolved in 2010 because of lack of support and financial issues.

== Season-by-season ==
The table below chronicles the achievements of Petrochimi Tabriz in various competitions since 2001.

Season	League	Position	Hazfi Cup	Notes
2001–02	East Azarbaijan League	5th	Did not qualify
2002–03	East Azarbaijan League	1st	Did not qualify	Promoted
2003–04	3rd Division	5th	First Round
2004–05	3rd Division	2nd	First Round	Promoted
2005–06	2nd Division	8th	Second Round
2006–07	2nd Division	11th	Third Round
2007–08	2nd Division	2nd	First Round	Promoted
2008–09	Azadegan League	3rd	1/16 Final
2009–10	Azadegan League	12th	1/4 Final

== Club managers ==
- (North Macedonia) Zoran Smileski (June 2008 – June 9)
- (Iran) Reza Vatankhah (June 2009 – Oct 09)
- (North Macedonia) Zoran Smileski (Oct 2009–2010)

== See also ==
- Petroshimi Tabriz FSC
- Petrochimi Tabriz Cycling Team
