= Zoran Smileski =

Macedonian football manager and player

Personal information
- Date of birth: 9 January 1950 (age 76)
- Place of birth: Skopje, PR Macedonia, FPR Yugoslavia
- Position: Right winger

Youth career
- 1960–1962: Hajduk Split
- 1962–1968: Partizan

Senior career*
Years	Team	Apps	(Gls)
1968–1971	Partizan	20	(3)
1969–1971	→ Borac Banja Luka (loan)	61	(20)
1972–1979	Borac Banja Luka	191	(18)
1979–1981	SPG Innsbruck		
1982	BSK Banja Luka		
Total		272+	(41+)

International career
1967–1968	Yugoslavia U18	5	(0)

Managerial career
- 1983–1984: Borac Banja Luka (youth)
- 1984: Borac Banja Luka
- 1984–1985: Borac Banja Luka (assistant)
- 1985–1986: Omarska
- 1986–1988: Borac Banja Luka (youth)
- 1988–1990: BSK Banja Luka
- 1991–1993: Borac Banja Luka
- 1993–1995: Pelister
- 1995–1998: Sileks
- 1996–1998: Macedonia U21
- 1998: Iraq U20
- 1999–2000: Shkëndija
- 2001: Shkëndija
- 2001–2002: Borac Banja Luka
- 2002: Pobeda
- 2003–2004: BSK Banja Luka
- 2004–2005: PAS Giannina
- 2005–2006: Borac Banja Luka
- 2006: Renova
- 2006–2007: Trikala
- 2007: Thiva
- 2007–2008: Shkëndija
- 2008–2009: Petrochimi Tabriz
- 2009–2010: Petrochimi Tabriz
- 2010–2011: Machine Sazi
- 2011–2012: Foolad Yazd
- 2012–2013: Naft Masjed Soleyman
- 2013: Iranjavan Bushehr
- 2013–2014: Teteks
- 2015–2016: Ljubanci
- * Club domestic league appearances and goals

Zoran Smileski (Macedonian: Зоран Смилески; born 9 January 1950) is a Macedonian former football manager and player.

== Club career ==
Born in Skopje, Smileski moved at an early age to Split, where his father was stationed in the Yugoslav People's Army. He started playing football with Hajduk Split at the age of 10. Later on, Smileski relocated with his family to Belgrade and joined the youth system of Partizan in 1962. He made his competitive debut for the club in the second half of the 1967–68 season. Smileski, along with the likes of Momčilo Vukotić and Vlado Pejović, was among a number of youngsters introduced to the team that season, and the new group of players came to be known collectively as the Bobek Babes. He was later loaned to Borac Banja Luka for two years, before returning to Partizan. In the 1972 winter transfer window, Smileski was transferred to Borac Banja Luka.

In 1979, after making over 150 appearances for Borac Banja Luka in the Yugoslav First League, Smileski went abroad to Austria to play for SPG Innsbruck, spending the next two and a half seasons with the club. He finished his playing career at BSK Banja Luka.

== International career ==
At international level, Smileski represented Yugoslavia at the 1968 UEFA European Under-18 Championship.

== Managerial career ==
After serving as an assistant to Đorđe Gerum at Borac Banja Luka, Smileski was manager of lower league club Omarska in the 1985–86 season, winning the title and promotion.

In 1991, Smileski was appointed as manager of Borac Banja Luka. He led them to the 1992 Mitropa Cup, defeating Italian side Foggia on penalties in the final. After leaving the club in March 1993, Smileski went to Macedonia and took charge of Pelister the following month, eventually losing in the Cup final later that season.

In 1995, Smileski became manager of Sileks. He would go on to win three consecutive Macedonian championship titles (1995–96, 1996–97, and 1997–98) and one national cup (1996–97).

In October 2006, it was reported that Smileski would be taking charge of Greek side Trikala. He left by mutual consent in February 2007. Shortly after, Smileski was appointed as manager of fellow Gamma Ethniki club Thiva.

In 2008, Smileski moved to Iran and served as manager of multiple clubs over the next five years, including Petrochimi Tabriz (two spells), Machine Sazi, Foolad Yazd, Naft Masjed Soleyman, and Iranjavan Bushehr.

== Career statistics ==
Appearances and goals by club, season and competition
Club	Season	League		
Club	Season	Division	Apps	Goals
Partizan	1967–68	Yugoslav First League	2	0
Partizan	1968–69	Yugoslav First League	8	2
Partizan	1969–70	Yugoslav First League	—	
Partizan	1970–71	Yugoslav First League	—	
Partizan	1971–72	Yugoslav First League	10	1
Partizan	Total		20	3
Borac Banja Luka (loan)	1969–70	Yugoslav Second League	29	16
Borac Banja Luka (loan)	1970–71	Yugoslav First League	32	4
Borac Banja Luka (loan)	Total		61	20
Borac Banja Luka	1971–72	Yugoslav First League	17	1
Borac Banja Luka	1972–73	Yugoslav First League	33	6
Borac Banja Luka	1973–74	Yugoslav First League	28	1
Borac Banja Luka	1974–75	Yugoslav Second League	30	4
Borac Banja Luka	1975–76	Yugoslav First League	32	2
Borac Banja Luka	1976–77	Yugoslav First League	—	
Borac Banja Luka	1977–78	Yugoslav First League	23	3
Borac Banja Luka	1978–79	Yugoslav First League	28	1
Borac Banja Luka	Total		191	18
Career total			272	41

== Honours ==
=== Player ===
Borac Banja Luka

- Yugoslav Second League: 1974–75 (Group West)
- Yugoslav Cup runner-up: 1974

=== Manager ===
Borac Banja Luka

- Mitropa Cup: 1992

Sileks

- Macedonian First League: 1995–96, 1996–97, 1997–98
- Macedonian Cup: 1996–97
