= Mehdi Eslami (footballer, born 1992) =

Iranian football defender (born 1992)

Personal information
- Full name: Mehdi Eslami
- Date of birth: 8 January 1992 (age 34)
- Place of birth: Sari, Iran
- Height: 1.88 m (6 ft 2 in)
- Position: Defender

Team information
- Current team: Ario Eslamshahr
- Number: 90

Youth career
- 2011–2013: Esteghlal

Senior career*
Years	Team	Apps	(Gls)
2012–2013	Esteghlal	2	(0)
2013–2014	Shahrdari Bandar Abbas	6	(1)
2014–2020	Esteghlal Ahvaz	68	(2)
2021–2024	Ario Eslamshahr	62	(9)
- * Club domestic league appearances and goals

Mehdi Eslami (Persian: مهدی اسلامی, born January 8, 1992, in Sari) is an Iranian football defender, who currently plays for Esteghlal Ahvaz.

== Club performance ==
He started playing football for the youngsters of Rah-e-Ahan and joined Saipa in the youth category and Saipa football club in the youth category. Doing military service he joined the Fajr team in Tehran and then joined the hopes of Esteghlal.

=== Esteghlal Tehran ===
After attending Fajr Football Club and leaving behind military service, he joined Esteghlal Tehran Football Club with a contract and won the Iranian League with the same year with Esteghlal Tehran.

=== Bandar Abbas Municipality ===
After winning the championship with Esteghlal Tehran and with the opinion of Amir Ghalehvani, he joined the Bandar Abbas Municipality Football Club on loan.

=== Independence of Ahwaz ===
After Esteghlal Tehran and Bandar Abbas Municipality, he joined the Esteghlal Ahvaz football team and played for this team for four seasons.

== National team ==
He has a history of playing in the national youth football team of Iran and the national youth football team of Iran in his record

== Honors ==
Premier League championship with Esteghlal Tehran in the twelfth league 2012-2013

== Club career ==
=== Club career statistics ===
As of 29 August 2014

Club performance			League		Cup		Continental		Total	
Season	Club	League	Apps	Goals	Apps	Goals	Apps	Goals	Apps	Goals
Iran			League		Hazfi Cup		Asia		Total	
2015–16	Esteghlal Ahvaz	Pro League	17	0	1	0	–	–	18	0
Career total			17	0	1	0	0	0	18	0
