= Ali Hassani Baghdadi =

Iraqi Twelver Shi'a Marja (born 1955)

Grand Ayatollah Sayyid Ali Hassani Baghdadi

Personal life
- Born: 1955 (age 70–71) Najaf, Iraq

Religious life
- Religion: Islam
- Sect: Shia; Twelver

Grand Ayatollah Sayyid Ali al-Hassani al-Baghdadi (Arabic: السيد علي الحسني البغدادي; born 1955) is an Iraqi Twelver Shi'a Marja.

He has studied in seminaries of Najaf, Iraq under Grand Ayatollah Abul-Qassim Khoei and Mohammad Baqir al-Sadr.

== See also ==
- List of maraji
