= 2025–26 Azadegan League =

35th season of Azadegan League

Azadegan League
- Season: 2025–26
- Dates: 28 August 2025 – 16 July 2026
- Champions: Nassaji Mazandaran
- Promoted: Nassaji Mazandaran; Mes Shahr-e Babak
- Relegated: Shahrdari Nowshahr; Navad Urmia; Damash Gilan
- Matches: 135
- Goals: 203 (1.5 per match)
- Biggest home win: Nirooye Zamini 5–0 Kara Gostar (3 November 2025)
- Biggest away win: Damash 1–5 Nassaji Mazandaran (3 November 2025)
- Highest scoring: Damash 1–5 Nassaji Mazandaran (3 November 2025)
- Longest winning run: Nassaji Mazandaran (6 matches)
- Longest unbeaten run: Nassaji Mazandaran (15 matches)
- Longest winless run: Damash (12 matches)
- Longest losing run: Kara Gostar (5 matches)
- All statistics correct as of 17 July 2026.

The 2025–26 Azadegan League is the 35th season of the Azadegan League and 25th as the second highest division since its establishment in 1991. The season features 13 teams from the 2024–25 Azadegan League, two new teams relegated from the 2024–25 Persian Gulf Pro League and three new teams promoted from the 2024–25 League 2.

== Teams ==
=== Stadia and locations ===
Locations of clubs in 2025–26 Azadegan League

Team	Location	Stadium	Capacity
Nassaji Mazandaran	Qaem Shahr	Vatani Stadium	15,000
Havadar	Tehran	Shahid Dastgerdi Stadium	8,250
Ario Eslamshahr	Eslamshahr	Emam Khomeini Eslamshahr	7,000
Be'sat Kermanshah	Kermanshah	Azadi Stadium	7,000
Damash Gilan	Rasht	Azodi	17,276
Mes Kerman	Kerman	Shohadaye Mes Kerman	30,000
Mes Shahr-e Babak	Shahr-e Babak	Shohada-ye Mes Shahr-e Babak	15,000
Kara Gostar	Tabriz	Yadegar-e Emam	66,833
Naft Gachsaran	Dogonbadan	Shohadaye Naft Gachsaran	7,500
Palayesh Naft	Bandar Abbas	Fajr Stadium	4,000
Nirooye Zamini	Tehran	Shohadaye Nezaja Stadium	1,000
Pars Jonoubi Jam	Jam	Takhti	15,000
Saipa	Tehran	Shahid Dastgerdi Stadium	8,250
Sanat Naft Abadan	Abadan	Takhti Stadium	10,000
Shahrdari Noshahr	Nowshahr	Shahrdari Stadium	4,000
Navad Urmia	Urmia	Shahid Bakeri Stadium	15,000
Fard Alborz	Karaj	Enghelab	15,000
Shenavarsazi Qeshm	Qeshm	Kandaloo Stadium	5,000

== League table ==
Pos	Team	Pld	W	D	L	GF	GA	GD	Pts	Promotion or relegation
1	Nassaji Mazandaran (C, P)	34	20	9	5	48	17	+31	69	Promotion to 2026–27 Persian Gulf Pro League
2	Mes Shahr-e Babak (P)	34	19	11	4	41	14	+27	68	Promotion to 2026–27 Persian Gulf Pro League
3	Sanat Naft Abadan	34	16	12	6	37	21	+16	60	Qualification for the Promotion/relegation play-off
4	Pars Jonoubi Jam	34	16	12	6	44	22	+22	60	
5	Saipa	34	16	11	7	30	18	+12	59	
6	Havadar	34	11	17	6	32	23	+9	50	
7	Palayesh Naft	34	10	17	7	26	19	+7	47	
8	Fard Alborz	34	10	16	8	24	15	+9	46	
9	Mes Kerman	34	10	15	9	23	18	+5	45	
10	Ario Eslamshahr	34	9	16	9	19	18	+1	43	
11	Be'sat Kermanshah	34	9	11	14	25	32	−7	38	
12	Kara Gostar	34	9	10	15	17	34	−17	37	
13	Nirooye Zamini	34	8	12	14	28	31	−3	36	
14	Naft Gachsaran	34	7	14	13	25	41	−16	35	
15	Shenavarsazi Qeshm	34	8	11	15	23	36	−13	35	
16	Shahrdari Nowshahr (R)	34	5	15	14	18	29	−11	30	Relegation to 2nd Division
17	Navad Urmia (R)	34	4	12	18	16	48	−32	24	Relegation to 2nd Division
18	Damash Gilan (R)	34	2	13	19	16	56	−40	19	Relegation to 2nd Division

Source: Soccerway
Rules for classification: 1) Points; 2) Head-to-head points; 3) Head-to-head goal difference; 4) Head-to-head goals scored; 5) Goal difference; 6) Goals scored.
(C) Champions; (P) Promoted; (R) Relegated

== Season statistics ==
=== Top scorers ===
Rank	Player	Club	Goals
1	(Iran) Fardin Najafi	Pars Jonoubi	19
2	(Iran) Mohammad Hossein Baseri	Mes Shahr-e Babak	12
3	(Iran) Amin Ghaseminejad	Havadar	10
3	(Iran) Mohsen Seyfi	Sanat Naft	10
3	(Iran) Alireza Valizadeh	Mes Shahr-e Babak	10
6	(Iran) Hadi Dehghani	Shenavar Sazi Qeshm	8
6	(Iran) Ali Nasiri	Nassaji	8
6	(Iran) Reza Rezaei	Sanat Naft	8
