= Persian Gulf Pro League =

Iranian association football league

Persian Gulf Pro League لیگ برتر خلیج فارس
- Organising body: Iran Football League Organization
- Founded: 1970; 56 years ago as Local League; 2001; 25 years ago as Iran Pro League
- Country: Iran
- Confederation: AFC
- Number of clubs: 18 (from 2026-27)
- Level on pyramid: 1
- Relegation to: Azadegan League
- Domestic cup(s): Hazfi Cup; Iranian Super Cup
- International cup(s): AFC Champions League Elite; AFC Champions League Two
- Current champions: Unfinished (2025–26)
- Most championships: Persepolis (16 titles)
- Most appearances: Jalal Hosseini (494)
- Top scorer: Reza Enayati (149 goals)
- Broadcaster: IRIB TV3 IRIB Varzesh Jame Jam TV IRIB Provincial Channels; Iraqiya Sports
- Website: IranLeague.ir
- Current: 2026–27 Persian Gulf Pro League

The Persian Gulf Pro League, branded as the Persian Gulf Pro League (Persian: لیگ برتر خلیج فارس, romanized: Lig-e Bartar-e Xalij-e Fârs), formerly known as the Iran Pro League (Persian: لیگ برتر ایران, Lig-e bartar-e Irân), is a professional association football league in Iran and the highest level of the Iranian football league system. It is controlled by the FFIRI and is contested by 18 teams over a 34-matchday period. Each year, its top team becomes the Iranian football champion, and the two lowest finishers are relegated to the Azadegan League.

Since 2013, the league comprises 16 teams. The winner of the Persian Gulf Pro League along with the Hazfi Cup champion automatically qualify for the AFC Champions League Elite group stages. The third-place team of the Persian Gulf Pro League qualifies for the AFC Champions League Elite Play-off round. The bottom two teams in the league are relegated to Azadegan League. The format and number of teams has varied over the years.

== Alternative names ==
The Persian Gulf Pro League has been referred to by various official, historical, alternative, and abbreviated names.

=== Official and common names ===
- Persian Gulf Pro League
- Persian Gulf League
- Persian Gulf Premier League
- Iran Pro League
- Iranian Pro League
- Iran Premier League
- Iranian Premier League
- Persian Gulf Professional League
- Persian Gulf Championship
- Iran Professional League

=== Abbreviations and short names ===
- PGPL – Persian Gulf Pro League
- IPL – Iran Pro League
- PGP – Persian Gulf Pro
- Iran PL – Iran Premier League
- Persian Gulf PL – Persian Gulf Premier League
- PG Pro League – Persian Gulf Professional League

=== Historical and former names ===
- Iran Premier Football League
- Iranian Football League
- Iranian Top Division

=== Alternative search names ===
- Persian Gulf Pro League
- Iran Pro League
- Iran Premier League
- Iranian Pro League
- IPL (Iran Pro League)

== History ==
At the turn of the millennium, the Iranian Football Federation decided to create a new professional football league. In 2001, the Iran Pro League was founded as the new top-level football league in Iran. After the Iran Pro League was established as the professional football league of Iran, the Azadegan League was declared as the second-highest league in the Iranian football league system. The Iran Pro League comprised 14 clubs until the 2003–04 season.

Persian Gulf Pro League champions
Season	Champions	Runners-up
2001–02	Persepolis	Esteghlal
2002–03	Sepahan	PAS Tehran
2003–04	PAS Tehran	Esteghlal
2004–05	Foolad	Zob Ahan
2005–06	Esteghlal	PAS Tehran
2006–07	Saipa	Esteghlal Ahvaz
2007–08	Persepolis	Sepahan
2008–09	Esteghlal	Zob Ahan
2009–10	Sepahan	Zob Ahan
2010–11	Sepahan	Esteghlal
2011–12	Sepahan	Tractor
2012–13	Esteghlal	Tractor
2013–14	Foolad	Persepolis
2014–15	Sepahan	Tractor
2015–16	Esteghlal Khuzestan	Persepolis
2016–17	Persepolis	Esteghlal
2017–18	Persepolis	Zob Ahan
2018–19	Persepolis	Sepahan
2019–20	Persepolis	Esteghlal
2020–21	Persepolis	Sepahan
2021–22	Esteghlal	Persepolis
2022–23	Persepolis	Sepahan
2023–24	Persepolis	Esteghlal
2024–25	Tractor	Sepahan
2025–26	—	
2026–27		

The first winner of the Iran Pro League was Persepolis, who beat Esteghlal by one point on the final match day. Esteghlal Rasht and East Azerbaijan's club Tractor had been relegated to the Azadegan League. Tractor took eight years to return to Iran's highest division

The runner-up of the 2002–03 season, PAS Tehran, became the Iranian football champion of the 2003–04 Iran Pro League. It was the last Iranian championship for PAS Tehran. PAS Tehran's professional football team was dissolved in 2007.

In 2004, the number of teams was increased from 14 to 16 teams. Foolad of Ahvaz became the first champion from Khuzestan Province. In the 2005–06 Iran Pro League Esteghlal celebrated their first championship since 2001. Shamoushak Noshahr and Shahid Ghandi (today known as Tarbiat Yazd) relegated to Azadegan League.

=== Persian Gulf Cup ===
On 12 August 2006, the Iranian Football Federation decided to give the league another name. Since then, the league had been primarily known in Iran as Persian Gulf Cup (PGC). The Football Federation decided this to promote the Persian naming. The name of the Persian Gulf has been disputed by some Arab countries since the 1960s due to political and ethnic differences between Iran and Arab countries. The football Federation decided also to change the logo of the league. The final logo was selected from over 130 designs and unveiled on 14 November 2006. Saipa won the 2006–07 Persian Gulf Cup. Until 2007, six different teams won the league title successively. A foreign player became the league's top goal scorer. Nigerian striker Daniel Olerum scored 17 goals in 27 matches for Aboomoslem. The winner of only two seasons before, Foolad, had to relegated to Azadegan League.

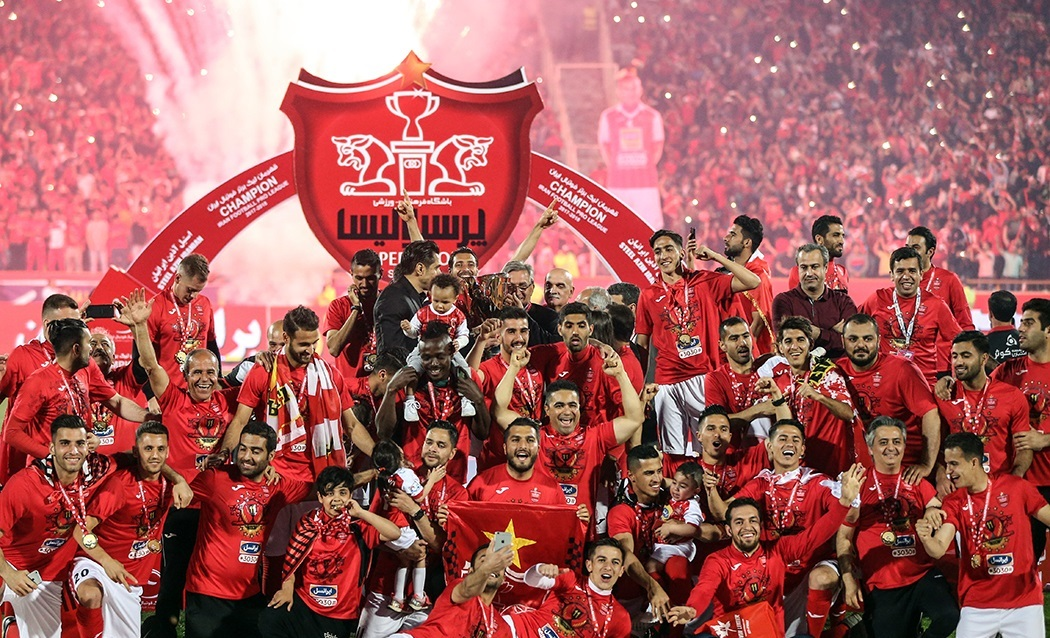
Persepolis players celebrating winning 2017–18 season

Before the start of the 2007–08 season, the number of teams was increased from 16 to 18 teams. The professional football team of PAS Tehran was also dissolved before the start of the season. Instead of PAS Tehran a new club was founded in Hamadan and named PAS Hamedan. In 2008, Saba Battery was moved from Tehran to Qom and renamed Saba Qom F.C.. The championship of the 2007–08 season was decided on the last matchday. Persepolis defeated Sepahan. Sanat Naft and Shirin Faraz (today known as Rahian Kermanshah) relegated to Azadegan League. The next season was dominated by Esteghlal and the two surprising teams Zob Ahan and Mes Kerman. Zob Ahan was the leading team after 75 minutes on matchday 34, before they lost their match against Foolad due to three conceded goals in the last 15 minutes with 1–4. Payam Mashhad was relegated, alongside Bargh Shiraz and Damash.

The 2009–10 Persian Gulf Cup was dominated by the two Isfahan-based clubs, Sepahan and Zob Ahan. Ultimately Sepahan won the league. Sepahan repeated their success by winning the 2010–11 and 2011–12 Persian Gulf Cup. Esteghlal won the 2012–13 Persian Gulf Cup and became for the eight time in their history the Iranian champion.

The League was scaled down from 18 to 16 teams before the beginning of the next season. Foolad won the 2013–14 Persian Gulf Cup. Foolad saved their championship after they defeated Gostaresh Foulad away .

=== Persian Gulf Pro League ===
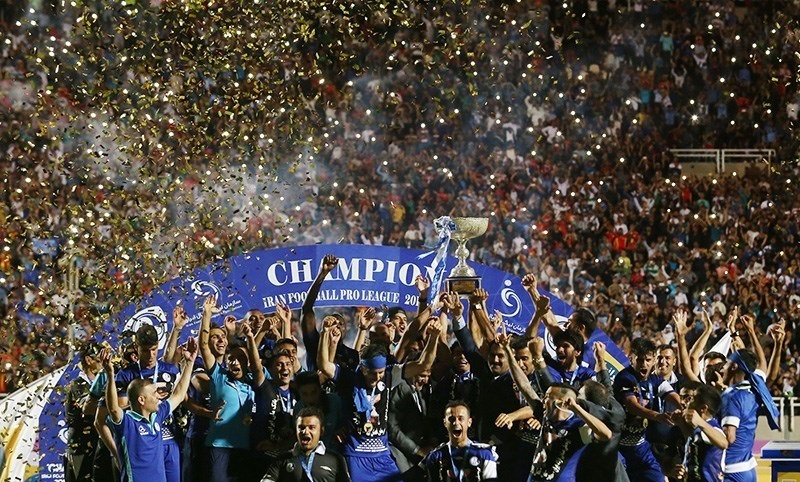
Esteghlal Khuzestan celebrate their championship in 2016.

The league changed its name from "Persian Gulf Cup" to "Persian Gulf Pro League" in 2014. The Iranian Football Federation decided also to change the logos of the Persian Gulf Pro League and of the Azadegan League.

The 2014–15 Persian Gulf Pro League was dominated by a championship battle between Sepahan, Tractor, and Naft Tehran. Sepahan secured their title with a 2–0 victory over Saipa, but thousands of Tractor supporters celebrated on the pitch, mistakenly believing that they won the league for the first time in club's history.

The 2015–16 Persian Gulf Pro League was not decided until the last matchday. Esteghlal Khuzestan won the league in front of Persepolis and Esteghlal. Persepolis dominated the next season and won the 2016–17 Persian Gulf Pro League.

From the 2016–17 season onwards Persepolis entered a period of sustained dominance. Under manager Branko Ivanković (and later Golmohammadi) the club won the record of consecutive league titles between 2016–17 and 2020–21, the longest championship streak in the professional era. The 2016–17 title was secured with relative comfort, while the following campaigns often went down to the final weeks, with Persepolis repeatedly fending off challenges from Esteghlal and Sepahan.

Esteghlal finally broke the sequence in 2021–22, completing an unbeaten season under Farhad Majidi and claiming their first league title since 2012–13. Persepolis responded by reclaiming the championship in 2022–23 and successfully defending it in 2023–24. The 2024–25 season produced a historic breakthrough: Tractor (Tractor Sazi) of Tabriz won their first-ever Persian Gulf Pro League title. Finishing with 68 points, they ended the long-standing dominance of the traditional Tehran and Isfahan clubs and became only the eighth different side to be crowned champions since the new league era from 2001.

The 2025–26 campaign began in August 2025 but was suspended indefinitely in early 2026 due to the outbreak of war and the ensuing instability in Iran. No champion was declared for that season. As a result of the unfinished competition, no teams were relegated, and the league was expanded to 18 clubs for the 2026–27 season with the addition of two promoted sides from the Azadegan League.

== Format ==
In the past, the number of teams was changed at various times. Since 2026, the league comprises 18 teams. Over the course of a season, which runs annually from July to the following May, each team plays twice against the others in the league, once at home and once away, resulting in each team competing in 34 games in total. Three points are awarded for a win, one for a draw and zero for a loss. The teams are ranked in the league table by points gained, then goal difference, then goals scored and then their head-to-head record for that season.

At the end of the season, the club with the most points becomes the Iranian champion. Currently, the Champions, the Runners Up and the Hazfi Cup champions qualify automatically for the group phase of the AFC Champions League, while the third-place team enters the AFC Champions League at the Play-off round. The bottom two teams are relegated to Azadegan League. Furthermore, all teams in the Persian Gulf Pro League can participate in the Hazfi Cup.

Number of teams	Period
14	2001–02 until 2003–04
16	2004–05 until 2006–07, 2013–14 until 2025–26
18	2007–08 until 2012–13, since 2026–27

== Logo ==
The official logo of the Pro League football competition, introduced in 2016.

== Ranking ==
As of 18 May 2025

Ranking				Member association (L: League, C: Cup, LC: League cup)	Club points								Total	2026–27 Competition		
2024–25	2023–24	Mvmt	Region	Member association (L: League, C: Cup, LC: League cup)	2016 (×0.3)	2017 (×0.4)	2018 (×0.5)	2019 (×0.6)	2021 (×0.7)	2022 (×0.8)	2023–24 (×0.9)	2024–25 (×1.0)	Total	ACL Elite	ACL Two	Challenge
1	1	—	W 1	Saudi Arabia (L, C)	9.500	18.600	10.000	26.350	20.950	19.075	27.100	34.542	119.957	3+0	1+0	0
2	2	—	E 1	Japan (L, C, LC)	10.500	21.850	13.850	21.800	17.875	20.088	21.350	27.970	107.663	3+0	1+0	0
3	3	—	E 2	South Korea (L, C)	20.750	9.950	18.350	13.600	22.750	15.800	22.350	14.762	90.982	2+1	1+0	0
4	4	—	W 2	(United Arab Emirates) United Arab Emirates (L, C)	18.000	11.350	8.100	7.633	14.400	8.083	25.500	16.400	74.466	2+1	1+0	0
5	5	—	W 3	Qatar (L, C)	22.000	13.400	19.850	15.900	7.300	13.500	8.100	14.701	69.326	2+1	1+0	0
6	6	—	W 4	Iran (L, C)	13.000	16.200	18.850	11.500	14.225	13.250	9.300	13.274	68.907	1+1	1+0	0

== Clubs ==
Team	Location	Stadium	Capacity
Aluminium	Arak	Imam Khomeini	12,500
Chadormalu	Yazd	Shahid Nasiri	15,000
Esteghlal	Tehran	Azadi	78,116
Esteghlal Khuzestan	Ahvaz	Ghadir	38,900
Foolad	Ahvaz	Foolad Arena	30,655
Gol Gohar	Sirjan	Qassem Soleimani	8,000
Havadar	Tehran	Shahid Dastgerdi	8,250
Kheybar	Khorramabad	Takhti	10,000
Malavan	Bandar-e Anzali	Sirous Ghayeghran	9,000
Mes Rafsanjan	Rafsanjan	Shohadaye Mes	10,000
Nassaji	Ghaemshahr	Vatani	27,700
Persepolis	Tehran	Azadi	78,116
Sepahan	Isfahan	Naghsh-e-Jahan	75,000
Shams Azar	Qazvin	Sardar Azadegan	15,000
Tractor	Tabriz	Yadegar-e Emam	66,833
Zob Ahan	Fooladshahr	Fooladshahr	20,000
Sanat Naft	Abadan	Takhti Stadium (Abadan)	15,000
Paykan	Tehran	Shohada-ye Shahr-e Qods Stadium	8,000

== Champions ==
Persian Gulf Pro League

Club	Winners	Runners-up	Winning seasons
Persepolis	9	3	2001–02, 2007–08, 2016–17, 2017–18, 2018–19, 2019–20, 2020–21, 2022–23, 2023–24
Sepahan	5	5	2002–03, 2009–10, 2010–11, 2011–12, 2014–15
Esteghlal	4	6	2005–06, 2008–09, 2012–13, 2021–22
Foolad	2	0	2004–05, 2013–14
Tractor	1	3	2024–25
PAS Tehran	1	2	2003–04
Saipa	1	0	2006–07
Esteghlal Khuzestan	1	0	2015–16
Zob Ahan	0	4	–
Esteghlal Ahvaz	0	1	–

Total

Club	Winners	Runners-up	Winning seasons
Persepolis	16	10	1971–72, 1973–74, 1975–76, 1995–96, 1996–97, 1998–99, 1999–2000, 2001–02, 2007–08, 2016–17, 2017–18, 2018–19, 2019–20, 2020–21, 2022–23, 2023–24
Esteghlal	9	11	1970–71, 1974–75, 1989–90, 1997–98, 2000–01, 2005–06, 2008–09, 2012–13, 2021–22
PAS Tehran	5	5	1976–77, 1977–78, 1991–92, 1992–93, 2003–04
Sepahan	5	5	2002–03, 2009–10, 2010–11, 2011–12, 2014–15
Saipa	3	0	1993–94, 1994–95, 2006–07
Foolad	2	0	2004–05, 2013–14
Tractor	1	3	2024–25
Esteghlal Khuzestan	1	0	2015–16
Zob Ahan	0	4	–
Bahman	0	2	–
Homa	0	1	–
Esteghlal Ahvaz	0	1	–

== All-timePersian Gulf Pro League table ==
Pos.	Club	Seasons	Matches Played	Wins	Draws	Losses	GF	GA	Goal Difference	Points	1st	2nd	3rd	4th	5th	6th	7th	T4	T7	Debut	Since/Last App.	Relegated	Best Pos.
1	Persepolis	24	732	370	222	140	1046	637	+409	1332	9	3	3	3	2	—	1	18	21	2001–02	2001–02	—	1st
2	Esteghlal	24	732	364	235	133	1065	635	+430	1327	4	6	8	1	1	1	—	19	21	2001–02	2001–02	—	1st
3	Sepahan	24	732	344	234	154	1072	662	+410	1266	5	5	3	2	3	1	1	15	20	2001–02	2001–02	—	1st
4	Zob Ahan	24	732	269	251	212	849	738	+111	1058	—	4	1	3	1	7	1	8	17	2001–02	2001–02	—	2nd
5	Foolad	23	698	263	239	196	775	696	+79	1028	2	—	3	2	2	2	4	7	15	2001–02	2008–09	1	1st
6	Tractor	17	522	228	163	131	689	504	+185	847	1	3	1	5	2	1	1	10	14	2001–02	2009-10	1	1st
7	Saipa	20	612	186	217	209	660	701	−41	775	1	—	1	1	—	1	2	3	6	2001–02	2020–21	1	1st
8	Paykan	19	578	162	188	228	572	694	−122	647	—	—	—	—	1	2	5	—	8	2001–02	2025–26	4	5th
9	Malavan	17	526	146	177	203	488	601	−113	615	—	—	—	—	—	2	3	—	5	2001–02	2022–23	2	6th
10	Saba Qom/Saba Battery	13	414	128	159	127	468	459	+9	543	—	—	1	2	—	2	1	3	6	2004–05	2016–17	1	3rd
11	Rah Ahan	11	354	119	114	121	432	422	10	471	—	—	—	—	—	—	—	—	—	2005–06	2015–16	1	8th
12	Fajr Sepasi	13	398	103	146	149	357	434	−77	455	—	—	—	1	—	—	—	1	1	2001–02	2025–26	2	4th
13	Sanat Naft	12	372	102	114	156	371	478	−107	420	—	—	—	—	—	—	1	—	1	2002–03	2023–24	3	7th
14	Mes Kerman	9	294	89	109	96	332	329	+3	376	—	—	1	—	—	1	1	1	3	2006–07	2022–23	1	3rd
15	Naft Tehran	8	252	91	88	73	286	258	+28	361	—	—	2	—	3	—	—	2	5	2010–11	2017–18	1	3rd
16	Aboomoslem	9	270	83	90	97	296	304	−8	339	—	—	—	1	2	1	—	1	4	2001–02	2009–10	1	4th
17	Esteghlal Ahvaz	9	274	80	78	116	327	402	−75	318	—	1	—	—	1	—	—	1	2	2002–03	2015–16	2	2nd
18	Shahr Khodro	8	240	74	80	86	218	245	−27	302	—	—	—	1	—	1	—	1	2	2014–15	2021–22	1	4th
19	PAS Tehran	6	168	72	59	37	263	181	+82	275	1	2	—	1	—	1	—	4	5	2001–02	2006–07	—	1st
20	Esteghlal Khuzestan	8	240	57	91	92	224	292	−68	262	1	—	—	—	—	—	1	1	2	2013–14	2023–24	1	1st
21	Bargh Shiraz	8	236	60	78	98	252	335	−83	258	—	—	—	—	—	—	1	—	1	2001–02	2008–09	1	7th
22	Gol Gohar	6	180	65	62	53	189	174	+15	257	—	—	—	1	2	1	—	1	4	2019–20	2019–20	—	4th
23	Damash/Pegah/Esteghlal Rasht	8	248	56	81	111	227	344	−117	249	—	—	—	—	—	—	—	—	—	2001–02	2013–14	4	7th
24	Nassaji	7	210	45	83	82	178	238	−60	218	—	—	—	—	—	—	—	—	—	2018–19	2024–25	1	9th
25	Mes Rafsanjan	5	150	47	52	51	148	149	−1	193	—	—	—	—	1	1	—	—	2	2020–21	2020–21	—	5th
26	Aluminium Arak	5	150	40	68	42	122	135	−13	188	—	—	—	—	—	—	2	—	2	2020–21	2020–21	—	7th
27	Gostaresh Foolad	5	150	39	60	51	147	161	−14	177	—	—	—	—	—	—	—	—	—	2013–14	2017–18	—	8th
28	PAS Hamedan	4	136	38	48	50	143	165	−22	162	—	—	—	—	1	—	—	—	1	2007–08	2010–11	1	5th
29	Naft Masjed Soleyman	6	180	27	75	78	116	216	−100	156	—	—	—	—	—	—	—	—	—	2014–15	2022–23	2	8th
30	Shahin Bushehr	4	132	27	48	57	124	175	−51	129	—	—	—	—	—	—	—	—	—	2009–10	2019–20	2	13th
31	Havadar	4	120	25	43	52	90	155	−65	118	—	—	—	—	—	—	—	—	—	2021–22	2024–25	1	11th
32	Pars Jonoubi Jam	3	90	22	38	30	82	87	−5	104	—	—	—	—	1	—	—	—	1	2017–18	2019–20	1	5th
33	Machine Sazi	4	120	17	39	64	84	163	−79	90	—	—	—	—	—	—	—	—	—	2016–17	2020–21	2	11th
34	Steel Azin	2	68	19	23	26	85	112	−27	80	—	—	—	—	1	—	—	—	1	2009–10	2010–11	1	5th
35	Shamoushak	3	86	16	26	44	66	118	−52	74	—	—	—	—	—	—	—	—	—	2003–04	2005–06	1	14th
36	Siah Jamegan	3	90	15	27	48	64	117	−53	72	—	—	—	—	—	—	—	—	—	2015–16	2017–18	1	13th
37	Shahrdari Tabriz	2	68	14	29	25	79	98	−19	71	—	—	—	—	—	—	—	—	—	2010–11	2011–12	1	12th
38	Sepidrood	2	60	11	17	32	48	92	−44	50	—	—	—	—	—	—	—	—	—	2017–18	2018–19	1	13th
39	Shams Azar	2	60	18	17	25	58	76	−18	71	—	—	—	—	—	—	—	—	—	2023–24	2023–24	—	8th
40	Aluminium Hormozgan	1	34	7	14	13	26	40	−14	35	—	—	—	—	—	—	—	—	—	2012–13	2012–13	1	15th
41	Payam	1	34	9	8	17	33	52	−19	35	—	—	—	—	—	—	—	—	—	2008–09	2008–09	1	16th
42	Chadormalou	1	30	8	10	12	22	28	−6	34	—	—	—	—	—	—	—	—	—	2024–25	2024–25	—	10th
43	Kheybar	1	30	8	9	13	24	31	−7	33	—	—	—	—	—	—	—	—	—	2024–25	2024–25	—	11th
44	Mes Sarcheshmeh	1	34	5	9	20	23	54	−31	24	—	—	—	—	—	—	—	—	—	2011–12	2011–12	1	18th
45	Shirin Faraz	1	34	3	12	19	25	59	−34	21	—	—	—	—	—	—	—	—	—	2007–08	2007–08	1	18th
46	Shahid Ghandi	1	30	4	7	19	21	43	−22	19	—	—	—	—	—	—	—	—	—	2005–06	2005–06	1	16th
47	Gahar Zagros	1	34	3	10	21	24	59	−35	19	—	—	—	—	—	—	—	—	—	2012–13	2012–13	1	18th
48	Mes Shahr-e Babak	1	0	0	0	0	0	0	0	0	—	—	—	—	—	—	—	—	—	2026–27	2026–27	—	-

2026–27 Persian Gulf Pro League
2026–27 Azadegan League
Lower leagues
Defunct teams
Founding members

Source: iplstats.com
Notes:
Only league matches; play-offs are not included in the all-time table.

== Attendances ==
=== Average league attendances ===
Season	Average	Highest attended club	Club average	Lowest attended club	Club average
2005–06	9,179	Esteghlal	33,467	Shamoushak Noshahr	3,542
2006–07	10,119	Esteghlal	35,000	Rah Ahan	4,073
2007–08	11,235	Persepolis	60,000	Rah Ahan	2,647
2008–09	8,954	Persepolis	40,688	PAS Hamedan	3,706
2009–10	12,298	Tractor	57,647	Paykan	2,313
2010–11	9,383	Tractor	42,000	Paykan	1,941
2011–12	9,488	Tractor	39,533	Mes Sarcheshmeh	1,706
2012–13	7,964	Esteghlal	34,250	Rah Ahan	1,942
2013–14	7,631	Persepolis	29,467	Rah Ahan	1,664
2014–15	6,921	Tractor	27,488	Saba Qom	1,365
2015–16	8,048	Persepolis	47,036	Naft Tehran	1,594
2016–17	8,086	Persepolis	48,567	Gostaresh Foulad	1,018
2017–18	9,060	Persepolis	39,786	Gostaresh Foulad	817
2018–19	12,212	Tractor	46,963	Esteghlal Khuzestan	1,507
2019–20	8,629	Persepolis	27,556	Machine Sazi	840
2020–21	No spectators due to the COVID-19 pandemic in Iran				
2021–22	10,572	Esteghlal	37,400	Paykan	100
2022–23	9,515	Tractor	33,375	Havadar	157
2023–24	10,824	Esteghlal	34,150	Havadar	200
2024–25	8,733	Tractor	44,071	Havadar	1,400

Notes:
Matches with spectator bans are not included in average attendances.
The official game reports can be found under the match schedule on iranleague.ir. The viewer numbers are noted in these. This results in average attendance.

=== Highest attended season matches ===
Season	Home team	Score	Away team	Attendance	Date	Week	Stadium
2005–06	Esteghlal	4–1	Bargh Shiraz	100,000	21 April 2006	30	Azadi
2006–07	Persepolis	2–1	Esteghlal	95,000	3 November 2006	8	Azadi
2007–08	Persepolis	2–1	Sepahan	110,000	17 May 2008	34	Azadi
2008–09	Persepolis	2–0	Damash	90,000	25 September 2008	8	Azadi
2008–09	Persepolis	1–1	Esteghlal	90,000	3 October 2008	9	Azadi
2008–09	Esteghlal	1–1	Persepolis	90,000	13 February 2009	26	Azadi
2009–10	Tractor	0–0	Moghavemat	95,000	22 January 2010	24	Sahand
2010–11	Esteghlal	1–0	Persepolis	100,000	15 October 2010	11	Azadi
2011–12	Persepolis	0–2	Esteghlal	100,000	16 September 2011	7	Azadi
2012–13	Esteghlal	0–0	Persepolis	100,000	25 January 2013	23	Azadi
2012–13	Esteghlal	1–2	Damash	100,000	10 May 2013	34	Azadi
2013–14	Esteghlal	0–0	Persepolis	100,000	6 September 2013	8	Azadi
2014–15	Tractor	3–3	Naft Tehran	80,000	15 May 2015	30	Sahand
2015–16	Persepolis	4–2	Esteghlal	100,000	15 April 2016	26	Azadi
2016–17	Persepolis	4–0	Shahr Khodro	80,000	19 April 2017	28	Azadi
2017–18	Esteghlal	1–0	Persepolis	100,000	1 March 2018	25	Azadi
2018–19	Persepolis	0–0	Sepahan	90,000	26 April 2019	27	Azadi
2019–20	Tractor	2–4	Esteghlal	80,000	1 November 2019	9	Sahand
2020–21	No spectators due to the COVID-19 pandemic in Iran						
2021–22	Esteghlal	0–0	Naft MIS	85,000	30 May 2022	30	Azadi
2022–23	Tractor	1–0	Sepahan	70,000	7 April 2023	25	Sahand
2022–23	Sepahan	1–1	Malavan	70,000	24 April 2023	27	Naghsh-e Jahan
2023–24	Tractor	0–1	Persepolis	80,000	16 August 2023	2	Sahand
2023–24	Tractor	0–0	Sepahan	80,000	3 April 2024	16	Sahand
2024–25	Tractor	1–1	Persepolis	90,000	22 August 2024	2	Sahand
2024–25	Tractor	2–1	Esteghlal	90,000	4 April 2025	25	Sahand

== Records ==
=== All-Time Persian Gulf Pro League Top Scorers ===
As of 18 October 2026

No.	Player	Goals	Apps	GPGR	Years
1	(Iran) Reza Enayati	147	358	0.41	2001–2017
2	(Iran) Mehdi Rajabzadeh	116	405	0.28	2001–2018
3	(Iran) Arash Borhani	115	339	0.33	2002–2017
4	(Brazil) Chimba	103	330	0.31	2012–2025
5	(Iran) Fereydoon Fazli	85	178	0.47	2001–2010
6	(Brazil) Édinho	82	182	0.45	2008–2017
7	(Iran) **Ali Alipour**	81	232		2013–Present
8	(Iran) **Sajjad Shahbazzadeh**	81	334	0.24	2010–present
9	**(Iran)** Jalal Rafkhaei	79	308	0.25	2005–2016
10	(Iran) Mohammad Reza Khalatbari	79	431	0.18	2003–2023

Players in bold are still active in the league.

*GPGR: Goals Per Game Ratio

=== All-time top appearances in Iran league ===
As of 19 October 2026

No	Player	Appearance	Years
1	Jalal Hosseini	490	2002–2022
2	(Iran) Mehdi Rahmati	466	2001–2020
3	(Iran) Ebrahim Sadeghi	439	2001–2017
4	(Iran) Mohammadreza Khalatbari	433	2003–2023
5	(Iran) Hossein Badamaki	421	2001–2018
6	(Iran) Mehdi Rajabzadeh	408	2001–2018
7	(Iran) Khosro Heydari	406	2002–2019
8	**(Iran)** **Milad Fakhreddini**	401	2009–Present
9	(Iran) **Sasan Ansari**	382	2012–Present
10	(Iran) Morteza Asadi	380	2005–2018

== Broadcasting and sponsorship ==
=== Broadcasting ===
The state-owned television channel IRIB has the broadcasting rights for the most matches of the Persian Gulf Pro League, Azadegan League and Hazfi Cup. Each match of Esteghlal and Persepolis is broadcasting by IRIB TV3, IRIB's channel.

After the 1979 revolution, the right to broadcast the Iranian leagues was exclusively given to IRIB. The organization broadcast matches throughout the decades in SD 240p and below, drawing criticism from the sports media. It was announced in 2024 that the image quality will be upgraded to HD in the coming years.

=== Sponsorship ===
The Persian Gulf Pro League has been sponsored since 2005. There have been four sponsors since the league's formation.

- 2001–2005: no sponsor
- 2005–2007: Zamzam
- 2007–2009: Padideh
- 2009–2014: Irancell
- 2014–2016: Sun Star
- 2016–present: Fanap

== Awards ==
=== Trophy ===
The league championship trophy is made up of two parts, the main part is shiny Chrome and the smaller part shiny golden in color. The sides of the trophy are taken from the armour of two Persian Achaemenid soldiers. This trophy also has references to the Persian Gulf. Every season, a new copy of this trophy, which takes about one and a half months to make, is made by artisans to be presented to the champions. Medals are also distributed. The medals and the championship trophy are made of brass metal, the medals and the championship trophy are both gold plated.

== See also ==
- Football in Iran
- Iranian football league system
- League 2
- League 3
- Iranian Super Cup
- Hazfi Cup
- Azadegan League
