= 2011–12 Esteghlal F.C. season =

Esteghlal Tehran FC
2011–12 season
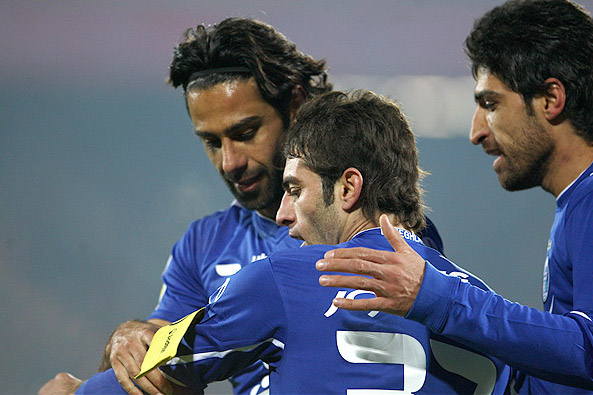
- President: Ali Fathollahzadeh
- Head coach: Parviz Mazloomi
- Stadium: Azadi Stadium
- IPL: 3rd
- Champions League: Round of 16
- Hazfi Cup: Champions
- Top goalscorer: League: Mojtaba Jabari (10); All: Mojtaba Jabari (13); Arash Borhani (13)
- Highest home attendance: 93,000 vs Tractor Sazi (9 September 2011)
- Lowest home attendance: 5,000 vs Mes Sarcheshmeh (30 October 2011); 5,000 vs Sanat Naft (13 December 2011); 5,000 vs Mes Kerman (15 January 2012)
- Average home league attendance: 32,235
Home colours	Away colours	Third colours

The 2011–12 season are the Esteghlal Football Club's 11th season in the Iran Pro League, and their 18th consecutive season in the top division of Iranian football. They are also competing in the Hazfi Cup and AFC Champions League, and 67th year in existence as a football club. Mojtaba Jabbari and Arash Borhani both with 13 goals are the top scorers of Esteghlal.

== Club ==
=== Kit ===
Supplier: (Germany) Uhlsport
Sponsor(s): (Iran) City Bank

Home Kit	Away Kit	Third Kit

=== Coaching staff ===
Position	Staff
Head coach	(Iran) Parviz Mazloomi
Assistant Coach	(Germany) Michael Henke
First Team Coach	(Iran) Behtash Fariba
First Team Coach	(Iran) Attila Hejazi
Goalkeeper Coach	(Iran) Hossein Torabpour
Analyzer	(Iran) Mehdi Arjanginia
Fitness Trainer	(Iran) Mohammadreza Molaei
Technical Adviser	(Iran) Morteza Mohasses
Technical Manager	(Iran) Mansour Pourheidari

=== Other information ===
Chairman	(Iran) Ali Fatollahzadeh
Deputy Chairman	(Iran) Ali Nazari Juybari
Football Academy President	(Iran) Reza Rajabi
Doctor	(Iran) Akbar Rezaei
Psychologist	(Iran) Abbas Montazeri
Media Officer	(Iran) Mohammad Hayrani
Ground (capacity and dimensions)	Azadi Stadium (100,000 / 110x75 meters)

=== Technical Committee ===
Name
(Iran) Hassan Rowshan
(Iran) Alireza Mansourian
(Iran) Javad Ghorab
(Iran) Asghar Hajilou

== Player ==
=== First team squad ===
Last updated: 5 January 2012

No.	Name	Nationality	Position (s)	Date of Birth (Age)	Signed From
Goalkeepers
1	Mehdi Rahmati	(Iran)	GK	February 2, 1983 (aged 28)	(Iran) Sepahan
21	Mehrdad Hosseini	(Iran)	GK	February 8, 1989 (aged 22)	(Iran) Persepolis
22	Hadi Zarrin Saed	(Iran)	GK	July 25, 1979 (aged 32)	(Iran) Machine Sazi
39	Mehdi Eslami	(Iran)	GK	May 5, 1985 (aged 26)	(Iran) PAS Hamedan
41	Mohammad Torkaman	(Iran)	GK	November 5, 1990 (aged 21)	(Iran) Gostaresh Foolad
Defenders
2	Khosro Heydari	(Iran)	RM, RB	September 14, 1983 (aged 28)	(Iran) Sepahan
3	Mehdi Amirabadi (c)	(Iran)	RB, LB	February 22, 1979 (aged 32)	(Iran) Saipa
4	Hamid Azizzadeh	(Iran)	CB	June 6, 1981 (aged 30)	(Iran) Aluminium Hormozgan
5	Hanif Omranzadeh	(Iran)	CB	April 30, 1985 (aged 26)	(Iran) PAS Hamedan
12	Jlloyd Samuel	(Trinidad and Tobago)	LB, CB, DM	March 29, 1981 (aged 30)	(England) Bolton Wanderers
16	Meisam Hosseini	(Iran)	LB	June 7, 1987 (aged 24)	(Iran) Gostaresh Foolad
31	Javad Shirzad	(Iran)	LB	September 20, 1982 (aged 29)	(Iran) Foolad
33	Pejman Montazeri	(Iran)	CB, RB	September 6, 1983 (aged 28)	(Iran) Foolad
40	Ali Hamoudi	(Iran)	RB, RM	March 21, 1986 (aged 25)	(Iran) Foolad
Midfielders
6	Kianoush Rahmati	(Iran)	DM, CM	September 18, 1978 (aged 33)	(Iran) Saipa
8	Mojtaba Jabari	(Iran)	CM, AM	June 16, 1983 (aged 28)	(Iran) Aboomoslem
11	Mohsen Yousefi	(Iran)	LM, LW	May 26, 1984 (aged 27)	(Iran) Saba Qom
14	Andranik Teymourian	(Iran)	DM, CM	March 6, 1983 (aged 28)	(Iran) Tractor Sazi
17	Jacques Elong Elong	(Cameroon)	DM	February 20, 1981 (aged 30)	(Slovakia) DAC Dunajská Streda
28	Tohid Gholami	(Iran)	MF	December 22, 1991 (aged 20)	(Youth system)
29	Mehdi Akhoundi	(Iran)	MF		(Youth system)
32	Ferydoon Zandi	(Iran)	AM, LM	April 26, 1979 (aged 32)	(Iran) Steel Azin
34	Hossein Alavi	(Iran)	MF	February 25, 1989 (aged 22)	(Iran) Tarbiat Yazd
Forwards
9	Arash Borhani	(Iran)	ST	September 14, 1983 (aged 28)	(Iran) PAS Tehran
10	Milad Meydavoudi	(Iran)	RW, ST	January 20, 1985 (aged 26)	(Iran) Esteghlal Ahvaz
19	Ali Sabahi	(Iran)	ST		(Youth system)
20	Goran Jerković	(France)	ST	November 10, 1986 (aged 25)	(Lithuania) FK Tauras
37	Esmaeil Sharifat	(Iran)	RM, RW	June 6, 1988 (aged 23)	(Iran) Esteghlal Ahvaz
Players transferred during the season
7	Farhad Majidi	(Iran)	ST	June 3, 1977 (aged 34)	(United Arab Emirates) Al-Ahli
13	Karrar Jassim	(Iraq)	SM, SS	June 11, 1987 (aged 24)	(Iran) Tractor Sazi
15	Waleed Ali	(Kuwait)	LM	November 3, 1980 (aged 31)	Al Kuwait
25	Mojtaba Mojaz	(Iran)	~~ST~~	~~April 24, 1991 (aged 20)~~	(Youth system)
30	Ferydoon Rezaei	(Iran)	GK	August 24, 1990 (aged 21)	(Youth system)

=== Iran Pro League squad ===
As of 1 September 2010. Esteghlal F.C. Iran Pro League Squad 2011-12

Note: Flags indicate national team as defined under FIFA eligibility rules; some limited exceptions apply. Players may hold more than one non-FIFA nationality.

No.	Pos.	Nation	Player
1	GK	IRI	Mehdi Rahmati
2	DF	IRI	Khosro Heydari
3	DF	IRI	Mehdi Amirabadi (Vice-Captain)
4	DF	IRI	Hamid Azizzadeh
5	DF	IRI	Hanif Omranzadeh
6	MF	IRI	Kianoush Rahmati
7	FW	IRI	Farhad Majidi (Captain)
8	MF	IRI	Mojtaba Jabbari (3rd captain)
9	FW	IRI	Arash Borhani
10	FW	IRI	Milad Meydavoudi
11	MF	IRI	Mohsen Yousefi
12	DF	TTO	Jlloyd Samuel
13	MF	IRQ	Karrar Jassim
14	MF	IRI	Andranik Teymourian
15	MF	KUW	Waleed Ali

No.	Pos.	Nation	Player
16	DF	IRI	Meysam Hosseini
17	MF	CMR	Jacques Elong Elong
20	FW	FRA	Goran Jerković
21	GK	IRI	Mehrdad Mohammad-Hosseini
22	GK	IRI	Hadi Zarrin Saed
29	MF	IRI	Tohid Gholami
30	GK	IRI	Ferydoon Rezaei
31	DF	IRI	Javad Shirzad
32	MF	IRI	Ferydoon Zandi
33	DF	IRI	Pejman Montazeri
34	FW	IRI	Hossein Alavi
37	FW	IRI	Esmaeil Sharifat
39	GK	IRI	Mehdi Eslami
40	DF	IRI	Ali Hamoudi

=== AFC Champions League squad ===
As of 02 February 2012. Esteghlal F.C. Champions League Squad 2011-12

Note: Flags indicate national team as defined under FIFA eligibility rules; some limited exceptions apply. Players may hold more than one non-FIFA nationality.

No.	Pos.	Nation	Player
1	GK	IRI	Mehdi Rahmati
2	DF	IRI	Khosro Heydari
3	DF	IRI	Mehdi Amirabadi (captain)
4	DF	IRI	Hamid Azizzadeh
5	DF	IRI	Hanif Omranzadeh
6	MF	IRI	Kianoush Rahmati
8	MF	IRI	Mojtaba Jabbari (vice captain)
9	FW	IRI	Arash Borhani
10	FW	IRI	Milad Meydavoudi
11	MF	IRI	Mohsen Yousefi
12	DF	TTO	Jlloyd Samuel
14	MF	IRI	Andranik Teymourian

No.	Pos.	Nation	Player
16	DF	IRI	Meysam Hosseini
17	MF	CMR	Jacques Elong Elong
20	FW	FRA	Goran Jerković
21	GK	IRI	Mehrdad Hosseini
22	GK	IRI	Hadi Zarrin Saed
29	MF	IRI	Tohid Gholami
31	DF	IRI	Javad Shirzad
32	MF	IRI	Ferydoon Zandi
33	DF	IRI	Pejman Montazeri
36	GK	IRI	Mehdi Eslami
37	FW	IRI	Esmaeil Sharifat
40	DF	IRI	Ali Hamoudi

== Transfers ==
Confirmed transfers 2011–12

- Updated on 6 January 2011

=== Summer ===
In: Note: Flags indicate national team as defined under FIFA eligibility rules; some limited exceptions apply. Players may hold more than one non-FIFA nationality.

No.	Pos.	Nation	Player
13	MF	IRQ	Karrar Jassim (from Tractor Sazi)
40	MF	IRI	Ali Hamoudi (from Foolad)
16	DF	IRI	Meysam Hosseini (from Gostaresh Foolad)
1	GK	IRI	Mehdi Rahmati (from Sepahan)
14	MF	IRI	Andranik Teymourian (from Tractor Sazi)
4	DF	IRI	Hamid Azizadeh (from Aluminium Hormozgan)
15	MF	KUW	Waleed Ali (from Al Kuwait)
21	GK	IRI	Mehrdad Hosseini (from Persepolis)
32	MF	IRI	Ferydoon Zandi (from Steel Azin)
2	MF	IRI	Khosro Heydari (from Sepahan)
22	GK	IRI	Hadi Zarrin-Saed (from Machine Sazi)

Out: Note: Flags indicate national team as defined under FIFA eligibility rules; some limited exceptions apply. Players may hold more than one non-FIFA nationality.

No.	Pos.	Nation	Player
18	DF	IRI	Mehrshad Momeni (to (United States) Los Angeles Blues)
16	DF	BRA	André Luiz de Oliveira Regatieri (released, to (Brazil) J. Malucelli)
32	MF	IRI	Iman Mobali (to (United Arab Emirates) Sharjah)
22	GK	IRI	Mohammad Mohammadi (to Damash Gilan)
6	DF	IRI	Hadi Shakouri (to Shahin Bushehr)
17	MF	IRI	Farzad Ashoubi (to Tractor Sazi)
12	FW	IRI	Mehdi Seyed-Salehi (to Sepahan)
2	DF	IRI	Amir Hossein Sadeghi (to Tractor Sazi)
1	GK	IRI	Vahid Talebloo (to Shahin Bushehr)
5	DF	IRI	Bijan Koushki (to Mes Kerman)
20	MF	BRA	Felipe Alves de Souza (to Zob Ahan)
23	MF	IRI	Omid Ravankhah (to Saipa)
15	MF	IRI	Yaghoub Karimi (to Naft Tehran)
11	MF	IRQ	Hawar Mulla Mohammed (to Zob Ahan)
26	DF	IRI	Fardin Abedini (to Tractor Sazi)

=== Winter ===
In: Note: Flags indicate national team as defined under FIFA eligibility rules; some limited exceptions apply. Players may hold more than one non-FIFA nationality.

No.	Pos.	Nation	Player
20	FW	FRA	Goran Jerković (from (Lithuania) FK Tauras)
12	DF	TTO	Jlloyd Samuel (from (England) Bolton Wanderers)
17	MF	CMR	Jacques Elong Elong (from (Slovenia) Dunajská Streda)
34	MF	IRI	Hossein Alavi (from Tarbiat Yazd)
39	GK	IRI	Mehdi Eslami (from Pas Hamedan)

Out: Note: Flags indicate national team as defined under FIFA eligibility rules; some limited exceptions apply. Players may hold more than one non-FIFA nationality.

No.	Pos.	Nation	Player
25	FW	IRI	Mojtaba Mahboub Mojaz (on loan to Mes Sarcheshmeh)
7	FW	IRI	Farhad Majidi (on loan to (Qatar) Al-Gharafa)
15	MF	KUW	Waleed Ali (Released, to Al Kuwait)
13	MF	IRQ	Karrar Jassim (Released, to Shahin Bushehr)

== Competitions ==
=== Overview ===
Competition	Started round	Current position / round	Final position / round	First match	Last match
2011–12 Persian Gulf Cup	—	—	Third-place	3 August 2011	11 May 2012
AFC Champions League	Qualifying play-off	—	Round of 16	11 February 2012	May 22, 2012
2011–12 Hazfi Cup	Round of 32	—	Winner	26 October 2011	15 March 2012

Updated to match played 16 May 2012
Source: Competitions

=== Iran Pro League ===
==== Standings ====
Pos	Team	Pld	W	D	L	GF	GA	GD	Pts	Qualification or relegation
1	Sepahan (C)	34	19	10	5	54	27	+27	67	Qualification for the 2013 AFC Champions League group stage
2	Tractor Sazi	34	19	9	6	57	32	+25	66	Qualification for the 2013 AFC Champions League group stage
3	Esteghlal	34	19	9	6	58	34	+24	66	Qualification for the 2013 AFC Champions League group stage
4	Saba Qom	34	12	14	8	40	38	+2	50	Qualification for the 2013 AFC Champions League qualifying play-off
5	Naft Tehran	34	13	10	11	36	38	−2	49	

Updated to match(es) played on 11 May 2012. Source: varzesh3.com
Rules for classification: 1) points; 2) goal difference; 3) number of goals scored.
(C) Champions

==== Results summary ====
Overall								Home						Away					
Pld	W	D	L	GF	GA	GD	Pts	W	D	L	GF	GA	GD	W	D	L	GF	GA	GD
34	19	9	6	58	34	+24	66	9	4	4	26	16	+10	10	5	2	32	18	+14

Last updated: 11 May 2012.
Source: FIFA.com

==== Results by round ====
Round	1	2	3	4	5	6	7	8	9	10	11	12	13	14	15	16	17	18	19	20	21	22	23	24	25	27	28	26	29	30	31	32	33	34
Ground	A	H	A	H	A	H	A	H	A	H	A	H	A	H	A	H	A	H	A	H	A	H	A	H	A	A	H	H	A	H	A	H	A	H
Result	D	W	W	W	W	L	W	W	L	D	W	W	D	W	W	L	W	D	W	L	L	W	W	L	D	D	D	W	W	W	D	D	W	W
Position	5	4	2	2	1	2	1	1	2	2	1	1	1	1	1	1	1	1	1	1	1	1	1	2	2	3	3	2	2	2	2	3	3	3

Updated to match(es) played on 11 May 2012. Source: "Ipl".
A = Away; H = Home; W = Win; D = Draw; L = Loss

==== Matches ====
Win Draw Loss Postponed

August 3, 2011 1	Sepahan	1 – 1	Esteghlal	Isfahan
22:30 UTC+04:30	Januário 64'; Jamshidian (yellow card)	Report	Borhani 84'; Borhani (yellow card); Sharifat (yellow card) (yellow card) (red card)	Stadium: Foolad Shahr Stadium; Attendance: 15,000; Referee: Mohsen Ghahremani

August 8, 2011 2	Esteghlal	1 – 0	Damash Gilan	Tehran
22:00 UTC+04:30	Majidi 32'; Teymourian (yellow card)	Report		Stadium: Azadi Stadium; Attendance: 70,000; Referee: Yadollah Jahanbazi

August 12, 2011 3	Mes Kerman	1 – 2	Esteghlal	Kerman
22:00 UTC+04:30	Bayatinia 86'; Seifi (yellow card); Salaripour (yellow card); Kolahkaj (yellow card)	Report	Majidi 70'; Sharifat 80'; Sharifat (yellow card); Teymourian (yellow card); Rahmati (yellow card)	Stadium: Shahid Bahonar Stadium; Attendance: 15,000; Referee: Alireza Faghani

August 16, 2011 4	Esteghlal	2 – 0	Fajr Sepasi	Tehran
22:00 UTC+04:30	Waleed Ali 44'; Farhad Majidi 49'	Report	Haghighi (yellow card); Heydari (yellow card)	Stadium: Azadi Stadium; Attendance: 75,000; Referee: Hedayat Mombeini

August 24, 2011 5	Foolad	1 – 4	Esteghlal	Ahvaz
22:00 UTC+04:30	Reza Norouzi 4'; Samal Said (yellow card); Rinaldo (yellow card)	Report	Majidi 3' 89'; Sharifat 38'; Meydavoudi 85'; Majidi (yellow card); Teymourian (yellow card)	Stadium: Takhti Stadium; Attendance: 15,000; Referee: Ahmad Salehi

September 9, 2011 6	Esteghlal	2 – 3	Tractor Sazi	Tehran
18:45 UTC+4:30	Majidi 19'; Jabbari 67'; Omranzadeh (yellow card); Karrar (yellow card); Rahmati (yellow card)	Report	Hosseini 42'; Alenemeh 45+2'; Flávio Paixão 84'; Akbarpour (yellow card); Asadi (yellow card)	Stadium: Azadi Stadium; Attendance: 93,000; Referee: Mohsen Torky

September 16, 2011 7	Persepolis	0 – 2	Esteghlal	Tehran
18:30 UTC+04:30	Badamaki (yellow card); Rezaei (yellow card); Zare (yellow card); Noormohammadi (yellow card)	Report	Majidi 15'; Jabari 82'; Rahmati (yellow card); Heidari (yellow card)	Stadium: Azadi Stadium; Attendance: 100,000; Referee: Mohsen Torky; Man of the Match: Jabari

September 26, 2011 8	Esteghlal	1 – 0	Saipa	Tehran
18:30 UTC+04:30	Jabari 78'; Majidi (yellow card); Jabari (yellow card); Karrar (yellow card)	Report	Sadeghi (yellow card)	Stadium: Azadi Stadium; Attendance: 20,000; Referee: Mohsen Ghahremani

October 1, 2011 9	Malavan	4 – 2	Esteghlal	Anzali
17:15 UTC+03:30	Rafkhaei 43' 61' (pen.); Nezamipour 45'; Nozhati 64'; Daghagheleh (yellow card)	Report	Borhani 8'; Meydavoudi 48'; Rahmati (yellow card); Borhani (yellow card); Karrar (yellow card); Montazeri (red card)	Stadium: Takhti Stadium; Attendance: 3,000; Referee: Saeid Mozaffarizadeh

October 14, 2011 10	Esteghlal	1 – 1	Rah Ahan	Tehran
18:15 UTC+03:30	Jabari 75'; Hamoudi (yellow card); Teymourian (yellow card); Rahmati (yellow card); Jabari (yellow card); Sharifat (yellow card)	Report	Abbasfard 16'; Chahjouei (yellow card); Pashaei (yellow card); Kazemi (yellow card)	Stadium: Azadi Stadium; Attendance: 30,000; Referee: Mahmud Rafiei

October 22, 2011 11	Zob Ahan	0 – 2	Esteghlal	Isfahan
16:45 UTC+03:30	Mahini (yellow card); Hadadifar (yellow card)	Report	Omranzadeh 9'; Meydavoudi 45'; Majidi (yellow card); Zandi (yellow card)	Stadium: Foolad Shahr Stadium; Attendance: 10,000; Referee: Mohsen Torky

October 30, 2011 12	Esteghlal	1 – 0	Mes Sarcheshmeh	Tehran
17:45 UTC+03:30	Meydavoudi 56'; Teymourian (red card)	Report	Nourollahi (yellow card); Fathollahi (red card)	Stadium: Azadi Stadium; Attendance: 5,000; Referee: Mohsen Ghahremani

November 19, 2011 13	Saba Qom	1 – 1	Esteghlal	Qom
14:15 UTC+03:30	Enayati 2'; Bayat (yellow card); Nouri (red card)	Report	Borhani 17'; Amirabadi (yellow card); Omranzadeh (yellow card)	Stadium: Yadegar Emam Stadium; Attendance: 7,000; Referee: Mohsen Torky

November 24, 2011 14	Esteghlal	3 – 2	Shahin Bushehr	Tehran
16:45 UTC+03:30	Jabbari 45+1' 54' 90+4'; Meydavoudi (yellow card)	Report	Nazarzadeh 66'; Lek Kcira 88'; Talebloo (yellow card)	Stadium: Azadi Stadium; Attendance: 10,000; Referee: Ahmad Salehi

December 3, 2011 15	Shahrdari Tabriz	1 – 2	Esteghlal	Tabriz
15:15 UTC+03:30	Ghanbari 87'; Kamyabinia (yellow card); Pirzadeh (yellow card)	Report	Borhani 18'; Majidi 39' (pen.); Rahmati (yellow card)	Stadium: Yadegar-e Emam Stadium; Attendance: 15,000; Referee: Hedayat Mombeini

December 13, 2011 16	Esteghlal	1 – 2	Sanat Naft	Tehran
16:15 UTC+03:30	Majidi 30'	Report	Koohnavard 9'; Ramezani 32'	Stadium: Azadi Stadium; Attendance: 5,000; Referee: Mohsen Torky

December 17, 2011 17	Naft Tehran	0 – 2	Esteghlal	Tehran
16:15 UTC+03:30	José Narciso (yellow card)	Report	Teymourian 30'; Omranzadeh 86'; Rahmati (yellow card)	Stadium: Azadi Stadium; Attendance: 10,000; Referee: Mohsen Ghahremani

January 6, 2012 18	Esteghlal	1 – 1	Sepahan	Tehran
16:15 UTC+03:30	Shirzad 32'; Montazeri (yellow card); Borhani (yellow card)	Report	Seyed-Salehi 53'; Ahmadi (yellow card); Beikzadeh (yellow card)	Stadium: Azadi Stadium; Attendance: 30,000; Referee: Saeid Mozaffarizadeh

January 10, 2012 19	Damash Gilan	0 – 1	Esteghlal	Rasht
15:00 UTC+03:30		Report	Jerković 37'; Jerković (yellow card); Sharifat (yellow card); Samuel (yellow card)	Stadium: Shahid Azodi Stadium; Attendance: 10,000; Referee: Alireza Faghani

January 15, 2012 20	Esteghlal	0 – 1	Mes Kerman	Tehran
16:40 UTC+03:30	Borhani (yellow card); Samuel (yellow card); Jabari (yellow card)	Report	Hasanzadeh 85'; Seifi (yellow card); Hosseinkhani (yellow card)	Stadium: Azadi Stadium; Attendance: 5,000; Referee: Mahmud Rafiei

January 19, 2012 21	Fajr Sepasi	2 – 1	Esteghlal	Shiraz
15:00 UTC+03:30	Rajabzadeh 9' (pen.) 84'; Rajabzadeh (yellow card)	Report	Jabari 19' (pen.); Amirabadi (yellow card); Montazeri (yellow card); Yousefi (yellow card)	Stadium: Hafezieh Stadium; Attendance: 15,000; Referee: Ahmad Salehi

January 25, 2012 22	Esteghlal	2 – 1	Foolad	Tehran
18:00 UTC+03:30	Borhani 60' 77'	Report	Norouzi 90+1'; Salimi (yellow card); Karimi (yellow card)	Stadium: Azadi Stadium; Attendance: 15,000; Referee: Yadollah Jahanbazi

January 29, 2012 23	Tractor Sazi	0 – 2	Esteghlal	Tabriz
15:30 UTC+03:30	Ebrahimi (yellow card); Hatami (yellow card); Ashoubi (yellow card); Hosseini (yellow card); Hajsafi (red card)	Report	Jabari 43' (pen.) 90+4' (pen.); Heydari (yellow card); Samuel (yellow card)	Stadium: Yadegar-e Emam Stadium; Attendance: 80,000; Referee: Mohsen Torky

February 2, 2012 24	Esteghlal	2 – 3	Persepolis	Tehran
18:00 UTC+03:30	Meydavoudi 32'; Zandi 50'; Hamoudi (yellow card); Zandi (yellow card); Sharifat (yellow card)	Report 1 Report 2	Zayed 82' 83' 90+2'; Oladi (red card) 68'	Stadium: Azadi Stadium; Attendance: 80,000; Referee: Alireza Faghani; Man of the Match: Zayed

February 6, 2012 25	Saipa	2 – 2	Esteghlal	Tehran
17:00 UTC+03:30	Manouchehri 33' 54'; Mohammad Rezaei (yellow card); Ansarifard (yellow card); Ebrahimi (yellow card); Latifi (yellow card); Sadeghi (yellow card)	Report 1 Report 2	Zandi 58' 89'	Stadium: Azadi Stadium; Attendance: 2,000; Referee: Ahmad Salehi

March 28, 2012 26	Esteghlal	1 – 0	Malavan	Tehran
17:00 UTC+04:30	Yousefi 18'; Hamoudi (yellow card)	Report 1 Report 2		Stadium: Azadi Stadium; Attendance: 20,000; Referee: Saeid Mozaffarizadeh

March 10, 2012 27	Rah Ahan	2 – 2	Esteghlal	Tehran
16:00 UTC+03:30	Abdi 2'; Kazemi 16'; Barani (yellow card)	Report 1 Report 2	Samuel 24'; Montazeri 52'; Heydari (yellow card); Amirabadi (yellow card)	Stadium: Azadi Stadium; Attendance: 3,000; Referee: Mohsen Ghahremani

March 24, 2012 28	Esteghlal	2 – 2	Zob Ahan	Tehran
17:00 UTC+04:30	Yousefi 63'; Meydavoudi 70'; Sharifat (yellow card)	Report 1 Report 2	Mansouri 35'; Felipe Alves 54'; Salsali (yellow card); Ahmadi (yellow card) (yellow card) (red card); Mahini (yellow card) (yellow card) (red card)	Stadium: Azadi Stadium; Attendance: 20,000; Referee: Touraj Haghverdi

April 8, 2012 29	Mes Sarcheshmeh	1 – 3	Esteghlal	Sarcheshmeh
17:00 UTC+04:30	Samereh 15'	Report 1 Report 2	Hamoudi 40'; Jerković 52'; Zandi 74'; Samuel (yellow card); Borhani (yellow card)	Stadium: Mes Sarcheshmeh Stadium; Attendance: 7,000; Referee: Alborz Hajipour

April 13, 2012 30	Esteghlal	3 – 0	Saba Qom	Tehran
18:55 UTC+04:30	Montazeri 16'; Jerković 26'; Hosseini 43'; Teymourian (yellow card); Hosseini (yellow card); Meydavoudi (yellow card)	Report 1 Report 2	Kashi (yellow card)	Stadium: Azadi Stadium; Attendance: 30,000; Referee: Alireza Faghani

April 22, 2012 31	Shahin Bushehr	1 – 1	Esteghlal	Bushehr
17:00 UTC+04:30	Shokouhmagham 45'; Latifi (yellow card)	Report 1 Report 2	Jerković 61'	Stadium: Shahid Beheshti Stadium; Attendance: 15,000; Referee: Mohsen Torky

April 27, 2012 32	Esteghlal	0 – 0	Shahrdari Tabriz	Tehran
19:10 UTC+04:30	Teymourian (yellow card); Montazeri (yellow card)	Report 1 Report 2		Stadium: Azadi Stadium; Attendance: 10,000; Referee: Touraj Haghverdi

May 6, 2012 33	Sanat Naft	1 – 2	Esteghlal	Abadan
17:00 UTC+04:30	Founéké Sy 9'	Report	Jerković 24'; Hosseini 76'; Teymourian (yellow card)	Stadium: Takhti Stadium; Attendance: 20,000; Referee: Alireza Faghani

May 11, 2012 34	Esteghlal	3 – 0	Naft Tehran	Tehran
17:00 UTC+04:30	Jerković 19'; Arash Borhani 3' 93'	Report 1 Report 2		Stadium: Azadi Stadium; Attendance: 30,000; Referee: Saeid Mozaffarizadeh

=== AFC Champions League ===
==== Qualifying play-off ====
Win Draw Loss Postponed

February 10, 2012 Semi-final	Esteghlal (Iran)	2 – 0	(Iran) Zob Ahan	Tehran
17:15 UTC+03:30	Heydari 23'; Borhani 67'	Report		Stadium: Azadi Stadium; Attendance: 33,750; Referee: Minoru Tōjō (Japan)

February 18, 2012 Final	Esteghlal (Iran)	3 - 1	(Saudi Arabia) Al-Ettifaq	Tehran
17:20 UTC+03:30	Jerković 37'; Heydari 62'; Borhani 65'	Report	Al-Salem 59'	Stadium: Azadi Stadium; Attendance: 61,120; Referee: Valentin Kovalenko (Uzbekistan)

==== Group stage ====
===== Group A =====
Pos	Team	Pld	W	D	L	GF	GA	GD	Pts	Qualification	JAZ	EST	RAY	NQA
1	(United Arab Emirates) Al-Jazira	6	5	1	0	18	10	+8	16	Advance to knockout stage	—	1–1	3–2	4–1
2	(Iran) Esteghlal	6	3	2	1	8	3	+5	11	Advance to knockout stage	1–2	—	3–0	0–0
3	(Qatar) Al-Rayyan	6	2	0	4	9	12	−3	6		3–4	0–1	—	3–1
4	(Uzbekistan) Nasaf Qarshi	6	0	1	5	4	14	−10	1		2–4	0–2	0–1	—

Source: WorldFootball.net

Win Draw Loss

March 6, 2012 1	Al-Rayyan (Qatar)	0 - 1	(Iran) Esteghlal	Al-Rayyan
18:20 UTC+03:00		Report 1 Report 2	Jerković 90+1'	Stadium: Ahmed bin Ali Stadium; Attendance: 5,422; Referee: Ben Williams (Australia)

March 20, 2012 2	Esteghlal (Iran)	0 - 0	(Uzbekistan) Nasaf Qarshi	Tehran
19:00 UTC+03:30		Report 1 Report 2		Stadium: Azadi Stadium; Attendance: 41,520; Referee: Abdullah Al Hilali (Oman)

April 3, 2012 3	Esteghlal (Iran)	1 - 2	(United Arab Emirates) Al-Jazira	Tehran
19:00 UTC+04:30	Zandi 69'	Report 1 Report 2	Juma 6'; Baré 73'	Stadium: Azadi Stadium; Attendance: 36,735; Referee: Kim Dong-Jin (South Korea)

April 18, 2012 4	Al-Jazira (United Arab Emirates)	1 - 1	(Iran) Esteghlal	Abu Dhabi
19:45 UTC+04:00	Oliveira 63'	Report 1 Report 2	Borhani 24'	Stadium: Mohamed Bin Zayid Stadium; Attendance: 4,562; Referee: Masaaki Toma (Japan)

May 2, 2012 5	Esteghlal (Iran)	3 - 0	(Qatar) Al-Rayyan	Tehran
19:20 UTC+04:30	Borhani 22' (pen.) 90+3'; Sharifat 77'	Report 1 Report 2		Stadium: Azadi Stadium; Attendance: 53774; Referee: Tan Hai (China P.R.)

May 16, 2012 6	Nasaf Qarshi (Uzbekistan)	0 - 2	(Iran) Esteghlal	Qarshi
19:30 UTC+05:00		Report 1 Report 2	Jerković 10'; Jabari 50' (pen.)	Stadium: Qarshi Stadium; Attendance: 929; Referee: Minoru Tōjō (Japan)

==== Knockout stage ====
May 22, 2012 Round of 16	Sepahan (Iran)	2 – 0	(Iran) Esteghlal	Isfahan
20:30 UTC+04:30	Correa 8'; Bengar 34'	Report		Stadium: Foolad Shahr Stadium; Attendance: 12,351; Referee: Kim Dong-Jin (Korea Republic)

=== Hazfi Cup ===
==== Matches ====
Win Draw Loss Postponed

October 26, 2011 1/32	Esteghlal	5 – 1	Shirin Faraz	Tehran
18:00 UTC+03:30	Meydavoudi 33' 53'; Yousefi 62' 68'; Sharifat 76'	Report	Khosravi 88'	Stadium: Azadi Stadium; Attendance: 2,000; Referee: Shahin Hajbabaei

November 28, 2011 1/16	Esteghlal	1 – 0 (a.e.t.)	Mehr Karaj	Tehran
16:15 UTC+03:30	Ali Ahmadi 105' (o.g.)	Report		Stadium: Azadi Stadium; Attendance: 400; Referee: Yadollah Jahanbazi

December 9, 2011 Quarterfinal	Persepolis	0 – 3 (a.e.t.)	Esteghlal	Tehran
16:15 UTC+03:30		Report	Jabbari 95' 99'; Sharifat 107'	Stadium: Azadi Stadium; Attendance: 80,000; Referee: Hedayat Mombeini; Man of the Match: Jabari

December 30, 2011 Semifinal	Esteghlal	1 – 0	Shahrdari Yasuj	Tehran
16:30 UTC+03:30	Omranzadeh 57'	Report		Stadium: Azadi Stadium; Attendance: 15,000; Referee: Yadollah Jahanbazi

March 15, 2012 Final	Esteghlal	0 – 0 (a.e.t.) (4-1 p)	Shahin Bushehr	Shiraz
15:00 UTC+03:30		Report		Stadium: Hafezieh Stadium; Attendance: 16,369; Referee: Alireza Faghani
	Penalties
	Yousefi (penalty scored); Zandi (penalty scored); Samuel (penalty scored); Jerković (penalty scored)		Noori (penalty missed); Shokouhmagham (penalty missed); Ansarian (penalty scored)

==== Bracket ====
Round of 32
H	Persepolis	2
A	Mes Rafsanjan	1
H	Zob Ahan	2
A	Gostaresh Foolad Tabriz	1
A	Rah Ahan	1
H	Mehr Karaj	3
H	Esteghlal	5
A	Shirin Faraz Kermanshah	1
H	Foolad	2
A	Sepahan	0
H	Sanat Naft Abadan	3
A	Gahar Zagros	1
H	Saipa	0
A	Siah Jamegan Khorasan	1
A	Tractor Sazi	0(3)
H	Shahrdari Yasuj	0(4)
H	Moghavemat Sepasi	1
A	Etka Gorgan	0
H	Sanat Mes Kerman	(w/o)
A	Esteghlal Khuzestan	-
H	Saba	2
A	Payam Mokhaberat	1
A	Mes Sarcheshme	1
H	Shahrdari Arak	0
H	Damash Gilan	1(5)
A	Naft Tehran	1(4)
H	Shahrdari Tabriz	1
A	Machine Sazi Tabriz	2
A	Malavan	2
H	Aboomoslem Khorasan	3
H	Shahin Bushehr	3
A	Nirooye Zamini	1

Round of 16
A	Persepolis	3
H	Zob Ahan	2
A	Mehr Karaj	0
H	Esteghlal	1
A	Foolad	1
H	Sanat Naft	0
H	Siah Jamegan Khorasan	1
A	Shahrdari Yasuj	2
A	Moghavemat Sepasi	0
H	Sanat Mes Kerman	3
A	Saba Qom	0(5)
H	Mes Sarcheshme	0(4)
A	Damash Gilan	2
H	Machine Sazi Tabriz	1
H	Aboomoslem Khorasan	0
A	Shahin Bushehr	1

Quarter-Final
H	Persepolis	0
A	Esteghlal	3
A	Foolad	1(2)
H	Shahrdari Yasuj	1(4)
A	Sanat Mes Kerman	1(5)
H	Saba Qom	1(4)
H	Damash Gilan	1
A	Shahin Bushehr	2

Semi-Final
H	Esteghlal	1
A	Shahrdari Yasuj	0
A	Mes Kerman	0
H	Shahin Bushehr	2

Final
-	Esteghlal	0(4)
-	Shahin Bushehr	0(1)

Note: H: Home team, A: Away team

=== Friendly Matches ===
Win Draw Loss Postponed

July 21, 2011	Esteghlal	1 - 1	Esteghlal Jonub	Tehran
18:00 UTC+04:30	Borhani 57'	Goal report Farsnews report	Doroudian 43'	Stadium: Azadi Stadium; Attendance: 500

July 24, 2011	Esteghlal	1 - 3	Saba Qom	Tehran
18:15 UTC+04:30	Yousefi 40'	Farsnews report ILNA report	Enayati 1', 6'; Eslami 36'	Stadium: Azadi Stadium; Attendance: 2,000

July 27, 2011	Esteghlal	3 - 2	Gol Gohar	Tehran
18:20 UTC+04:30	Zandi 30'; Borhani 50' (pen.); Yousefi 60'	Farsnews Half-time report Farsnews report Goal report	20'; 35'	Stadium: Shahid Dastgerdi Stadium; Attendance: 200

September 3, 2011	Esteghlal	3 - 2	Esteghlal Ahvaz	Tehran
18:45 UTC+04:30	Meydavoudi 55'; Azizzadeh 74'; Sharifat 90+1'	Farsnews Half-time report Farsnews report EsteghlalTehranFC report	Rafiei 59'; Kiani 72'	Stadium: Shahid Dastgerdi Stadium; Attendance: 50; Referee: Morteza Kamrani

==== Velayat Cup ====
Team	Pld	W	D	L	GF	GA	GD	Pts
(Iran) Persepolis	2	1	1	0	3	2	+1	4
(Paraguay) Nacional	2	1	0	1	1	1	0	3
(Iran) Esteghlal	2	0	1	1	2	3	−1	1

Win Draw Loss

November 5, 2011 1	Esteghlal (Iran)	0 - 1	(Paraguay) Nacional	Tehran, Iran
16:30 UTC+03:30	Amirabadi (yellow card)	FarsNews Report; Report	Teixeira 65'	Stadium: Azadi Stadium; Attendance: 200; Referee: Alireza Faghani; Man of the Match: Don

November 7, 2011 2	Persepolis (Iran)	2 - 2	(Iran) Esteghlal	Tehran, Iran
16:30 UTC+03:30	Norouzi 6' (pen.) 46'; Memarzadeh (yellow card); Mamadou Tall (yellow card); Mohammad (yellow card) 80' (yellow-red card)	FarsNews Report; Report	Borhani 33'; Omranzadeh 70'; Shirzad (yellow card); Zandi (yellow card)	Stadium: Azadi Stadium; Attendance: 20,000; Referee: Saeid Mozaffari Zadeh; Man of the Match: Norouzi

== Statistics ==
=== Appearances ===
No.	Pos	Nat	Player	Total		Iran Pro League		AFC Champions League		Hazfi Cup	
No.	Pos	Nat	Player	Apps	Goals	Apps	Goals	Apps	Goals	Apps	Goals
1	GK	(Iran) IRI	Mehdi Rahmati	18	0	15+0	0	0+0	0	3+0	0
2	MF	(Iran) IRI	Khosro Heydari	11	0	11+0	0	0+0	0	0+0	0
3	DF	(Iran) IRI	Mehdi Amirabadi	9	0	6+3	0	0+0	0	0+0	0
4	DF	(Iran) IRI	Hamid Azizzadeh	3	0	1+2	0	0+0	0	0+0	0
5	DF	(Iran) IRI	Hanif Omranzadeh	14	0	14+0	0	0+0	0	0+0	0
6	MF	(Iran) IRI	Kianoosh Rahmati	14	0	13+1	0	0+0	0	0+0	0
7	FW	(Iran) IRI	Farhad Majidi	14	7	13+1	7	0+0	0	0+0	0
8	MF	(Iran) IRI	Mojtaba Jabari	13	1	11+2	1	0+0	0	0+0	0
9	FW	(Iran) IRI	Arash Borhani	12	1	9+3	1	0+0	0	0+0	0
10	FW	(Iran) IRI	Milad Meydavoudi	12	0	6+6	0	0+0	0	0+0	0
11	MF	(Iran) IRI	Mohsen Yousefi	8	0	2+6	0	0+0	0	0+0	0
13	MF	(Iraq) IRQ	Karrar Jassim	9	0	6+1	0	0+0	0	2+0	0
14	MF	(Iran) IRI	Andranik Teymourian	13	1	13+0	1	0+0	0	0+0	0
15	MF	(Kuwait) KUW	Waleed Ali	2	1	1+1	1	0+0	0	0+0	0
16	DF	(Iran) IRI	Meysam Hosseini	13	0	10+3	0	0+0	0	0+0	0
21	GK	(Iran) IRI	Mehrdad Hosseini	0	0	0+0	0	0+0	0	0+0	0
22	GK	(Iran) IRI	Hadi Zarrin-Saed	1	0	0+1	0	0+0	0	0+0	0
28	MF	(Iran) IRI	Tohid Gholami	1	0	0+1	0	0+0	0	0+0	0
31	DF	(Iran) IRI	Javad Shirzad	6	0	5+1	0	0+0	0	0+0	0
32	MF	(Iran) IRI	Ferydoon Zandi	5	0	3+2	0	0+0	0	0+0	0
33	DF	(Iran) IRI	Pejman Montazeri	10	0	10+0	0	0+0	0	0+0	0
37	FW	(Iran) IRI	Esmaeil Sharifat	11	1	5+6	1	0+0	0	0+0	0
40	MF	(Iran) IRI	Ali Hamoudi	10	0	9+1	0	0+0	0	0+0	0

=== Top scorers ===
Includes all competitive matches. The list is sorted by scored goals in Pro League when total goals are equal.

Last updated on 20 May 2012

Ranking	Position	Nation	Name	Pro League	Champions League	Hazfi Cup	Total
1	MF	(Iran)	Mojtaba Jabbari	10	1	2	13
1	FW	(Iran)	Arash Borhani	8	5	0	13
3	FW	(Iran)	Farhad Majidi	9	0	0	9
3	FW	(France)	Goran Jerković	6	3	0	9
5	FW	(Iran)	Milad Meydavoudi	6	0	2	8
6	MF	(Iran)	Ferydoon Zandi	4	1	0	5
6	FW	(Iran)	Esmaeil Sharifat	2	1	2	5
8	MF	(Iran)	Mohsen Yousefi	2	0	2	4
TOTALS				47	11	8	66

Friendlies and Pre-season goals are not recognized as competitive match goals.

=== Top assistors ===
Includes all competitive matches. The list is sorted by shirt number when total assistors are equal.

Last updated on 22 October 2011

Number	Nation	Position	Name	Iran Pro League	Champions League	Hazfi Cup	Total
1	MF	(Iran)	Mojtaba Jabbari	6	0	4	10
2	FW	(Iran)	Farhad Majidi	7	0	0	7
TOTALS				13	0	4	16

Friendlies and Pre-season goals are not recognized as competitive match assists.

=== Disciplinary record ===
Includes all competitive matches. Players with 1 card or more included only.

Last updated on 22 October 2011

No.	Nat.	Position	Name	Iran Pro League			AFC Champions League			Hazfi Cup			Total		
No.	Nat.	Position	Name	Yellow card	(yellow card) (yellow-red card)	Red card	Yellow card	(yellow card) (yellow-red card)	Red card	Yellow card	(yellow card) (yellow-red card)	Red card	Yellow card	(yellow card) (yellow-red card)	Red card
14	(Iran)	MF	Andranik Teymourian	5	0	1	0	0	0	0	0	0	5	1	0
37	(Iran)	MF	Esmaeil Sharifat	2	1	0	0	0	0	0	0	0	2	1	0
6	(Iran)	MF	Kianoush Rahmati	5	0	0	0	0	0	0	0	0	5	0	0
7	(Iran)	FW	Farhad Majidi	4	0	0	0	0	0	0	0	0	4	0	0
9	(Iran)	FW	Arash Borhani	2	0	0	0	0	0	0	0	0	2	0	0
2	(Iran)	DF	Khosro Heydari	3	0	0	0	0	0	0	0	0	3	0	0
32	(Iran)	MF	Fereydoon Zandi	1	0	0	0	0	0	0	0	0	1	0	0
TOTALS				11	1	0	0	0	0	0	0	0	11	2	0

Last updated: 22 October 2011
Source: Competitive matches and IPLStats.com
Ordered by (red card) , (second yellow card) and (yellow card)
(yellow card) = Number of bookings; (second yellow card) = Number of sending offs after a second yellow card; (red card) = Number of sending offs by a direct red card.

=== Goals conceded ===
- Updated on 20 May 2012

Number	Nation	Position	Name	Pro League	Champions League	Hazfi Cup	Total	Minutes per goal
1	(Iran)	GK	Mehdi Rahmati	34	4	0	38	111.18421 min
21	(Iran)	GK	Mehrdad Hosseini	0	0	0	0	0 min
22	(Iran)	GK	Hadi Zarrin-Saed	0	0	1	1	10 min
TOTALS				34	4	1	39	108.46154 min

=== Own goals ===
- Updated on 20 May 2012

Number	Nation	Position	Name	Pro League	Champions League	Hazfi Cup	Total
TOTALS				0	0	0	0

=== Overall statistics ===
	Total	Home	Away	Neutral
Games played	48	25	22	1
Games won	29	15	13	1
Games drawn	11	5	6	0
Games lost	8	5	3	0
Biggest win	5-1	5-1	4-1	4-1(Pen)
Biggest loss	2-4	2-3	2-4	N/A
Biggest win (League)	4-1	3-0	4-1	N/A
Biggest win (Cup)	5-1	5-1	3-0	N/A
Biggest win (Asia)	N/A	3-0	2-0	N/A
Biggest loss (League)	2-4	2-3	2-4	N/A
Biggest loss (Cup)	N/A	N/A	N/A	N/A
Biggest loss (Asia)	0-2	1-2	0-2	N/A
Clean sheets	22	13	8	1
Goals scored	81	42	39	0
Goals conceded	41	20	21	0
Goal difference	+40	+22	+18	0
Average GF per game	1.7	1.7	1.8	0
Average GA per game	0.9	0.8	1	0
Points (League)	66/102 (64.71%)	31/51 (60.78%)	35/51 (68.63%)	N/A
Winning rate	60.42%	60%	59.09%	100%
Most appearances	47	(Iran) Mehdi Rahmati		
Most minutes played	4225	(Iran) Mehdi Rahmati		
Top scorer	12	(Iran) Mojtaba Jabari		
Top assister	13	(Iran) Mojtaba Jabari		

Last updated: 20 May 2012
Source: Competitive matches

== See also ==
- 2011–12 Persian Gulf Cup
- 2011–12 Hazfi Cup
- 2012 AFC Champions League
