= 2012 Hazfi Cup final =

- Event: 2011-12 Hazfi Cup
| Esteghlal | Shahin Bushehr |
| 0 | 0 |
- Esteghlal won 4–1 on penalties
- Date: March 15, 2012
- Venue: Hafezieh, Shiraz
- Man of the Match: Mehdi Rahmati (Esteghlal)
- Fans' Man of the Match: Jlloyd Samuel (Esteghlal)
- Referee: Alireza Faghani
- Attendance: 16,369
- Weather: Fine; 8 °C (46 °F); 60% humidity

The 2012 Hazfi Cup final was the 25th edition of the Hazfi Cup since 1975. The match between Esteghlal and Shahin Bushehr took place on 15 March 2012 at the Hafezieh Stadium. Esteghlal beat Shahin Bushehr 4–1 on penalties and qualified for the 2013 AFC Champions League.

== Format ==
The rules for the final was exactly the different as the one for the previous knockout rounds. The tie was contested over one legs. If the teams could still not be separated, then extra time would have been played with a penalty shootout (taking place if the teams were still level after that). Both teams have agreed Hafezieh Stadium in Shiraz as the final venue but it was announced that because of Hafezieh's ground qualify in winter, the final match will be transferred to the newly established Ghadir Stadium in Ahvaz. It was later denied.

== Road to the finals ==
| Esteghlal | | | | Round | Shahin Bushehr |
|---|---|---|---|---|---|---|---|---|
| Opponent | Result | H/A | Esteghlal goalscorers | Second stage | Opponent | Result | H/A | Shahin Bushehr goalscorers |
| Shirin Faraz Kermanshah | 5–1 | H | Milad Meydavoudi(2), Mohsen Yousefi(2), Esmaeil Sharifat | 1/16 Final | Nirooye Zamini | 3–1 | H | Ivan Petrovic, Abbas Pourkhosravani |
| Mehr Karaj | 1–0 | H | Ali Ahmadi (OG) | 1/8 Final | Aboomoslem Khorasan | 1–0 | A | Mehdi Noori |
| Persepolis | 3–0 | A | Mojtaba Jabbari(2), Esmaeil Sharifat | Quarter-Final | Damash Gilan | 2–1 | A | Mehdi Noori, Morteza Aziz-Mohammadi |
| Shahrdari Yasuj | 1–0 | H | Hanif Omranzadeh | Semi-Final | Mes Kerman | 2–0 | H | Mehdi Noori, Ivan Petrovic |

== Match ==
Match statistics
| | Esteghlal | Shahin Bushehr |
|---|---|---|
| Goals scored | 0 | 0 |
| Total shots | 15 | 19 |
| Shots on target | 9 | 17 |
| Ball possession | 49% | 51% |
| Corner kicks | 3 | 6 |
| Fouls committed | 4 | 6 |
| Yellow cards | 0 | 1 |
| Red cards | 0 | 0 |

Shahin was qualified for the first time to the final but it was Esteghlal's 9th final performance. The match was scoreless after 120 minutes but there had been numerous scoring chances on both sides. Mehdi Noori had a good chance in the first half and shot for the goal but was hit to the goalpostwas. In the second half, Fereydoun Zandi, Arash Borhani and Jlloyd Samuel had many chances but all of them was kept out with a one-handed save by Shahin goalkeeper Vahid Talebloo, a former Esteghlal player. Ali Ansarian's shot was forced saves by Esteghlal goalkeeper Mehdi Rahmati. The game was end 0-0 and was advanced to the extra times.

In the extra times, both team tried to have an aggressive play in order to scoring the winning goal. In 112, Milad Meydavoudi hit a free kick but was saved by defensive wall. Goran Jerković also had a chance but was out of the gate.

The Blues proved to be the superior side with all four of their penalty takers converting from the spot, while only one of the three Shahin players stepping behind the ball withstood the pressure and summoned the necessary composure to score. In the penalties, Mohsen Yousefi, a left foot Midfielder scored Esteghlal's first goal. After that Mehdi Noori's shoot was out of target. Then, Fereydoun Zandi, a German-Iranian footballer, scored the second goal for Esteghlal. Shokouhmagham was behind the wall but his shoot was saved by Mehdi Rahmati. Jlloyd Samuel scored Esteghlal's third goal. Ali Ansarian scored for Shahin the first goal but Goran Jerković converted the winning penalty and Esteghlal won the trophy 4–1.

== Match details ==
March 15, 2012
15:00 (UTC+3:30)

| Esteghlal | 0 – 0 (a.e.t.) | Shahin Bushehr |
|---|---|---|
| | Report (in Persian) |
Penalties
| Yousefi (penalty scored); Zandi (penalty scored); Samuel (penalty scored); Jerković (penalty scored) | 4 - 1 | Noori (penalty missed); Shokouh Magham (penalty missed); Ansarian (penalty scored) |

Hafezieh Stadium, Shiraz
Attendance: 16,369
Referee: Alireza Faghani

| Esteghlal | Shahin Bushehr |

Esteghlal:
| GK | 1 | (Iran) Mehdi Rahmati |
| CB | 33 | (Iran) Pejman Montazeri |
| CB | 5 | (Iran) Hanif Omranzadeh |
| LB | 3 | (Iran) Mehdi Amirabadi (c) |
| RB | 40 | (Iran) Ali Hamoudi (substituted off) 112' |
| DM | 16 | (Iran) Meysam Hosseini (substituted off) 91' |
| CM | 12 | (Trinidad and Tobago) Jlloyd Samuel |
| CM | 32 | (Iran) Ferydoon Zandi |
| LM | 37 | (Iran) Esmaeil Sharifat (substituted off) 91' |
| RM | 2 | (Iran) Khosro Heydari |
| CF | 9 | (Iran) Arash Borhani |
Substitutes:
| GK | 22 | (Iran) Hadi Zarrin Saed |
| DF | 4 | (Iran) Hamid Azizzadeh |
| MF | 29 | (Iran) Tohid Gholami |
| MF | 11 | (Iran) Mohsen Yousefi (substituted in) 91' |
| DF | 31 | (Iran) Javad Shirzad |
| FW | 20 | (France) Goran Jerković (substituted in) 112' |
| FW | 10 | (Iran) Milad Meydavoudi (substituted in) 91' |
Manager:
(Iran) Parviz Mazloomi

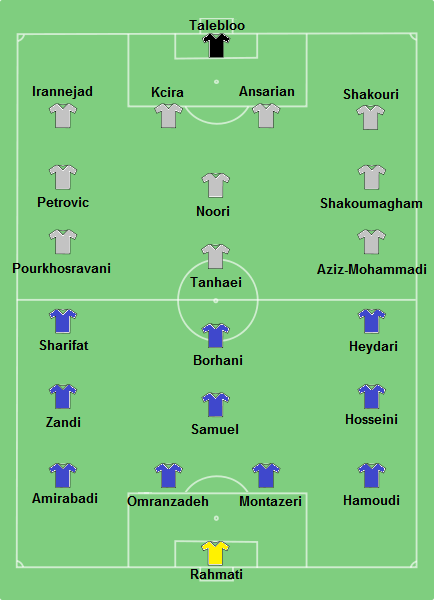

Shahin Bushehr:
| GK | 30 | (Iran) Vahid Talebloo (c) |
| CB | 16 | (Croatia) Lek Kcira |
| CB | 8 | (Iran) Ali Ansarian |
| LB | 11 | (Iran) Mohsen Irannejad |
| RB | 3 | (Iran) Hadi Shakouri (substituted off) 95' |
| CM | 6 | (Iran) Mehdi Noori |
| CM | 18 | (Iran) Amjad Shokouh Magham |
| LM | 10 | (Iran) Abbas Pourkhosravani |
| AM | 21 | (Serbia) Ivan Petrovic (yellow card) 119' |
| RM | 33 | (Iran) Morteza Aziz-Mohammadi (substituted off) 82' |
| CF | 27 | (Iran) Mansour Tanhaei (substituted off) 103' |
Substitutes:
| GK | 22 | (Iran) Majid Gholami |
| MF | 31 | (Iran) Saeid Bayat |
| DF | 24 | (Iran) Babak Latifi (substituted in) 103' |
| MF | 18 | (Iran) Mehrzad Rezaee (substituted in) 82' |
| MF | 23 | (Iran) Mehdi Kiani (substituted in) 95' |
| MF | 14 | (Iran) Hamid Reza Soleimani |
| DF | 29 | (Iran) Bahman Shirvani |
Manager:
(Iran) Hamid Derakhshan

Assistant referees:
Hassan Kamranifar
Rasoul Foroughi
Fourth official:
Hossein Asghari

Match rules:

- 90 minutes
- 30 minutes of extra-time if necessary
- Penalty shoot-out if scores still level
- Seven named substitutes
- Maximum of three substitutions

== Champions ==
Champions 2011–12 Hazfi Cup
Esteghlal Tehran
Sixth title

== See also ==
- 2011–12 Iran Pro League
- 2011–12 Azadegan League
- 2011–12 Iran Football's 2nd Division
- 2011–12 Iran Football's 3rd Division
- 2011–12 Hazfi Cup
- Super Cup 2012
- 2011–12 Iranian Futsal Super League
