= Parviz Mazloumi =

Iranian footballer and manager

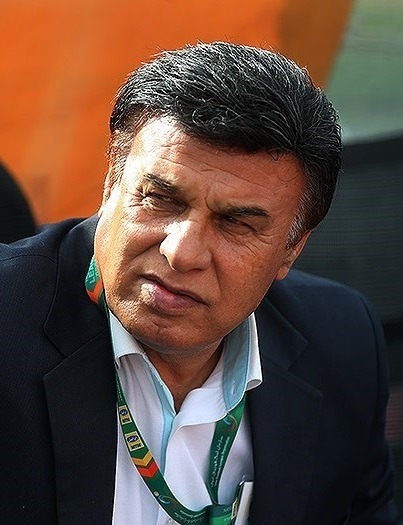
- Mazloumi in 2016

Personal information
- Full name: Parviz Mazloumi Tangestani
- Date of birth: September 16, 1954 (age 72)
- Place of birth: Abadan, Iran
- Position: Striker

Senior career*
Years	Team	Apps	(Gls)
1973–1975	Taj		
1975–1978	Tractor Sazi		
1978–1988	Esteghlal		

Managerial career
- 1992–1994: Poora
- 2003–2004: Saba Battery
- 2005–2006: Sanat Naft
- 2007: Iran B
- 2007–2008: Aboumoslem
- 2008–2010: Mes Kerman
- 2010: Aboumoslem
- 2010–2012: Esteghlal
- 2013: Aluminium
- 2013–2014: Mes Kerman
- 2015–2016: Esteghlal
- 2020: Iran U-20
- * Club domestic league appearances and goals

Parviz Mazloomi (Persian: پرویز مظلومی, born 16 September 1954) is a former Iranian footballer who is the team manager of the Esteghlal. He played for Esteghlal and Tractor Sazi in the 1970s and 1980s. He also managed many clubs such as Saba Battery, Sanat Naft, Aboumoslem, Mes Kerman and Esteghlal. He was also head coach of Iran B team in 2007 West Asian Football Federation Championship which won the title.

== Early life ==
Parviz Mazloumi was born on 16 September 1954 in Abadan, Iran. He had an older brother, Gholam Hossein Mazloumi who also was a well-known football player and played for both Esteghlal and Iran national football team. Gholam Hossein was also Esteghlal's head coach between 1988 and 1989.

== Playing career ==
As a player, he started his career playing at Tractor Sazi in 1975 where he scored nine goals during Takht Jamshid Cup. He left the club behind later in 1978 signing Esteghlal where he stayed until his retirement in 1989. He scored 72 goals for Esteghlal during those years. Among his most notable goals, was the one scored against Persepolis in Tehran derby in 1983 which led Esteghlal to a 1–0 victory.

== Managerial career ==
=== Early years ===
In June 2000, he started his career as a coach going to Poora. However, a year later, he moved back to home club, Esteghlal, to take over a position as an assissatnt manager working under Mansour Pourheidari, a job they both resigned from in less than a year time.

=== Saba and Sanat Naft ===
On 1 June 2002, Parviz Mazloumi became the head coach for the newly established Saba Battery where he managed to promote his team from 2nd Division to the Azadegan League becoming second at the end of the season, the job he was sacked from in May 2004. In July 2005, Mazloumi received an offer heading to Sanat Naft Abadan. He resigned on 19 July 2006.

=== Iran B Team ===
On 15 June 2007, he was appointed as head coach of Iran B national football team after team Iran refused to participate in 2007 West Asian Football Federation Championship and guided the team through to the title for the 3rd time in a row. The team was disbanded after the tournament.

=== Aboumoslem ===
After management of B team, he coached Aboumoslem where he was appointed as the coach midway through the season and saved the club from relegation at the time and finished the season in mid table.

=== Mes Kerman ===
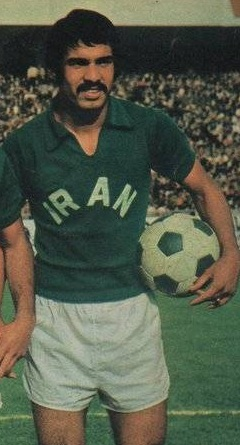
Mazloomi in 1975

He was appointed as the head coach of Mes on 9 June 2008 replacing with Amir Ghalenoei and was promoted to ACL for the first time in club history and finished third in the league. He was sacked after 17 weeks on 2 November 2009 because of the poor results in the league.

=== Esteghlal ===
==== 2010–11 season ====
He was appointed as head coach of Esteghlal on 13 June 2010 after the resignation of Samad Marfavi two weeks previously. He signed a two years contract with the club and was unveiled as the new manager on 15 June 2010 by Ali Fathollahzadeh, who returns to the club recently. By the end of the transfer window, after the 2010 FIFA World Cup, he had brought eight new players to is new side: Javad Shirzad from Foolad, Farzad Ashoubi from Mes Kerman, Iman Mobali from Al-Nasr, Esmaeil Sharifat and Milad Meydavoudi from Esteghlal Ahvaz and three Brazilian player such as Anderson from FC Seoul. Khosro Heydari and Fábio Januário was sold to Sepahan and Siavash Akbarpour was released.

His first game in charge was against Shahrdari Tabriz; Esteghlal won the match 3–2 with goals from Arash Borhani and Meydavoudi (2 goals). Esteghlal defeated Foolad five days later in the first Mazloomi home game. The following league games confirmed Mazloomi's statement, not losing in 12 weeks and defeated Sepahan and Persepolis. Mazloomi's side defeated Persepolis another time in Tehran derby 1–0 with a goal from Arash Borhani. These two wins helped Mazloumi to prove himself with Esteghlal's fans.

Esteghlal was eliminated in the group stage of 2011 AFC Champions League due to goal difference with group's runner up but was ended the season in the second place, three points behind of champions Sepahan. They also eliminated in Semifinal of Hazfi Cup by Malavan.

==== 2011–12 season ====
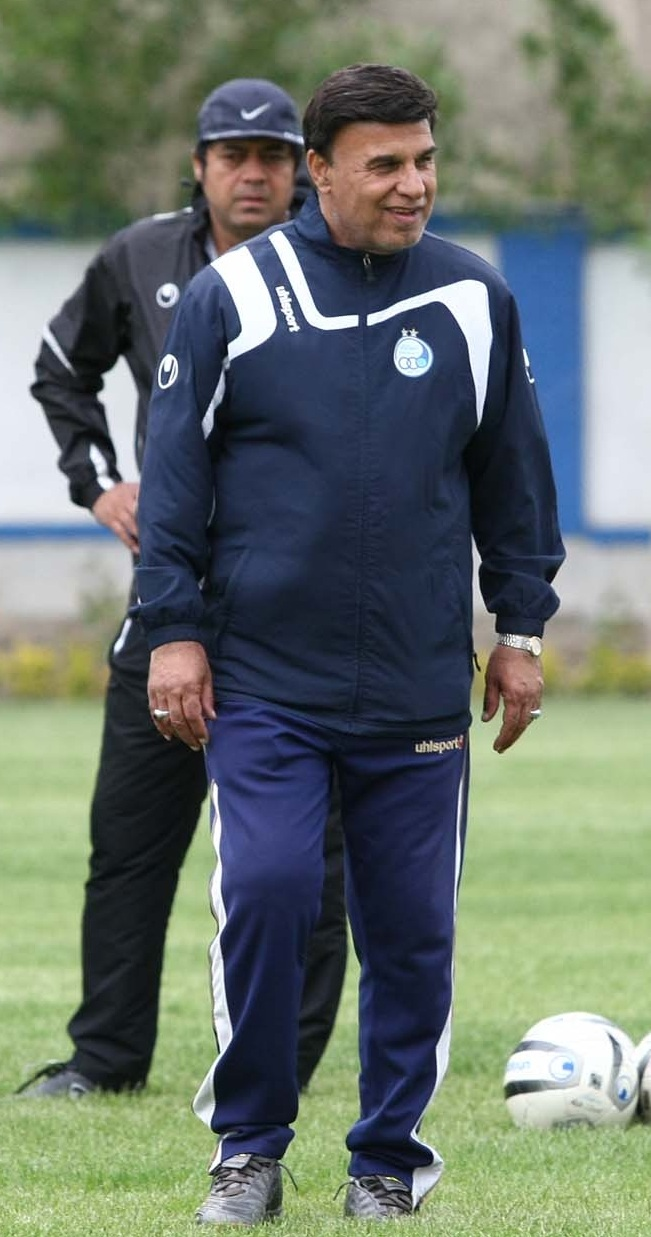
Mazloumi in Esteghlal's training

In the pre-season transfer break, some Iranian stars joins Esteghlal to help the team winning a treble. Mehdi Rahmati and Andranik Teymourian which was the league's expensive moves, Ferydoon Zandi, Karrar Jassim and Khosro Heydari. Arash Borhani and Mojtaba Jabbari also extended their contract to be part of Mazloumi's "dream team".

They began the league with a 1–1 draw with defending champions Sepahan in their home, not defeated until week 6 against Tractor Sazi.

Esteghlal defeated their rivals, Persepolis for the third time in a row under Mazloumi with goals from Farhad Majidi and Jabbari. This was also the first derby with more than a one-goal margin in over 10 years. They also defeated Persepolis in Hazfi Cup 3-0 which Mazloumi brokes Mansour Pourheidari's record in winning derbies. Match was tied 0–0 at the end of regulation time leading to overtime. In over time Esteghlal dominated the game scoring three goals claiming their 24th win in the Derby and their fourth consecutive competitive win for Esteghlal over their city rivals. This derby was the largest goal margin in 14 years and the largest Esteghlal win in over 30 years. Over 2 months later, it was announced that two of the Esteghlal players, Mehdi Amirabadi and Meysam Hosseini were tested positive for doping. There have been many rumours about the match being replayed or awarded to Persepolis, but the players were only given a warning. They won the Hazfi Cup final in a match against Shahin Bushehr, as Mazloomi's first glory in Esteghlal. Esteghlal finished the league in third place, one point behind the winner, Sepahan and goal-difference with runner up Tractor Sazi. After a 2-0 loss to Sepahan during ACL Round of 16, it was announced that Mazloumi's contract will not be renewed. He was officially sacked by the club on 29 May 2012 and was replaced with Amir Ghalenoei.

=== Gahar Zagros ===
On 9 October 2012, Parviz Mazloumi was appointed as the head coach of Gahar Zagros which has been without a head coach since former head coach Mehdi Tartar left the team. However, before getting a chance to lead his team in a match, Mazloumi resigned from his position on October 14, 2012 due to disputes over the ownership of the team as well as the financial problems Gahar was facing with.

=== Aluminium Hormozgan ===
On 11 February 2013, Mazloumi was appointed as the head coach of Aluminium Hormozgan, replacing former manager Akbar Misaghian who was sacked on the same day. His first match in charge of Aluminium came on 15 February 2013, a 2–2 draw away to Sanat Naft, the club that Mazloomi coached from 2005 to 2006. Mazloumi earned his first win as Aluminium's manager, on 5 April 2013, defeating Malavan 3–2 at their home.

On 10 May 2013, in a 2–2 draw with Sepahan on the last day of the matches, Aluminium was relegated to the lower division. On 1 July 2013, Mazloumi renewed his contract with Aluminium for another season to lead the club in Azadegan League.

=== Mes Kerman ===
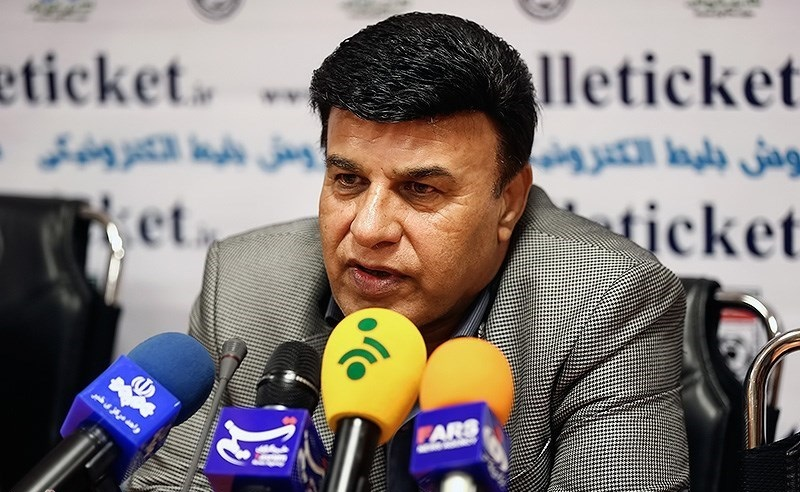
Mazloumi in press conference as Mes Kerman head coach

Mazloumi returns to Mes Kerman on 18 September 2013, signed a one-year contract. After he failed to rescue team from the bottom of the league, he resigned on 22 January 2014.

=== Return to Esteghlal ===
On 20 June 2015, Mazloumi was named as new manager of Esteghlal, with signing a two-year contract. Unless a good start with the team, Esteghlal finished the season in third position and missed direct qualification to the AFC Champions League. They lost their chances after two heavy defeats to their rivals, first a 4–2 defeated to Persepolis in Tehran derby and the second a 3–2 defeat to Tractor Sazi, which was managed by former Esteghlal coach Amir Ghalenoei. His side also missed Hazfi Cup title after lost to Zob Ahan in final. Three days after the match, Mazloumi was officially sacked by the club and replaced with Alireza Mansourian.

=== Statistics ===
As of 29 May 2016

Team	From	To	Record							
Team	From	To	G	W	D	L	GF	GA	+/-	Win %
Saba Battery	1 June 2002	19 May 2004	60	29	20	11	86	53	+33	48.33
Sanat Naft	2 July 2005	19 July 2006	22	11	5	6	27	14	+13	50.00
Iran B	15 June 2007	15 July 2007	4	3	1	0	5	1	+4	75.00
Aboomoslem	1 July 2007	3 February 2008	24	8	8	8	18	17	+1	33.33
Mes	1 July 2008	30 November 2009	51	22	14	15	81	69	+12	43.14
Esteghlal	13 June 2010	1 June 2012	95	51	27	17	163	99	+64	53.68
Aluminium	12 February 2013	18 September 2013	9	2	4	3	10	16	−6	22.22
Mes	18 September 2013	22 January 2014	17	4	8	5	23	26	−3	23.53
Esteghlal	20 June 2015	1 June 2016	34	17	13	4	64	32	+32	50.00
Total			317	147	101	69	479	323	+156	46.37

== Honours ==
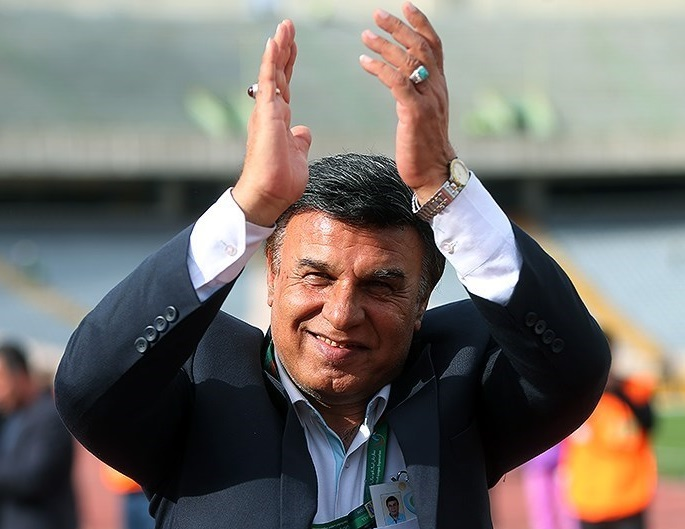

=== As a player ===
Tractor Sazi

- Hazfi Cup Runner up (1): 1975–76

Esteghlal

- Iran Pro League (1): 1982–83

=== As a manager ===
Saba

- Azadegan League (1): 2003–04

Iran B

- WAFF Championship (1): 2007

Esteghlal

- Hazfi Cup (1): 2011–12, Runner-up 2015–16
- Iran Pro League Runner up (1): 2010–11

=== Individual ===
- IFCA Manager of the Month: September 2015
