= Bahman Shirvani =

Iranian footballer

Personal information
- Full name: Bahman Shirvani
- Date of birth: 28 January 1989 (age 37)
- Place of birth: Sanandaj, Iran
- Position: Defender

Team information
- Current team: Shahin Bushehr

Youth career
- Bargh Shiraz

Senior career*
Years	Team	Apps	(Gls)
2008–2010	Bargh Shiraz	18	(0)
2010–2011	Shahin Bushehr	2	(0)
- * Club domestic league appearances and goals as of 13 August 2011

Bahman Shirvani (Persian: بهمن شیروانی; born January 28, 1989) is an Iranian footballer who plays for Shahin Bushehr F.C. in the Azadegan League.

== Club career ==
Shirvani joined Shahin Bushehr F.C. in 2010 after spending the previous two seasons at Bargh Shiraz F.C.

=== Club Career Statistics ===
Club performance			League		Cup		Continental		Total	
Season	Club	League	Apps	Goals	Apps	Goals	Apps	Goals	Apps	Goals
Iran			League		Hazfi Cup		Asia		Total	
2008–09	Bargh Shiraz	Iran Pro League	15	0			-	-		
2009–10	Bargh Shiraz	Azadegan League	25	0			-	-		
2010–11	Shahin	Iran Pro League	3	0			-	-		
Total	Iran		43	0			0	0		
Career total			43	0			0	0		

== Honours ==
=== Club ===
- Hazfi Cup
  - Runner up:1
    - 2011–12 with Shahin Bushehr
