= Goran Jerković (footballer, born 1986) =

French footballer (born 1986)

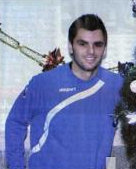
- Jerković in 2011

Personal information
- Date of birth: 10 November 1986 (age 40)
- Place of birth: Lyon, France
- Height: 1.87 m (6 ft 1 1/2 in)
- Position: Forward

Youth career
- 1996–2002: FC Menival
- 2001–2005: AS Cannes

Senior career*
Years	Team	Apps	(Gls)
2005–2008	Lyon Duchère	0	(0)
2008–2010	Charleroi-Marchienne	20	(6)
2010–2011	Žalgiris	9	(1)
2011–2012	Tauras Tauragė	17	(17)
2012	Esteghlal	15	(6)
2012–2013	Buriram United	11	(13)
2013	→ Bangkok Glass (loan)	10	(4)
2014–2015	Army United	20	(8)
2015	Jagodina	9	(0)
2016	Iskra Danilovgrad	8	(1)
2016–2017	Negeri Sembilan	15	(7)
2017	Siah Jamegan	18	(5)
2018	Nongbua Pitchaya	17	(13)
2019	East Riffa	8	(5)
2020	Lao Toyota	3	(1)
2021	FC Chitwan	6	(0)
Total		186	(87)
- * Club domestic league appearances and goals

Goran Jerković (born 10 November 1986) is a French former professional footballer who played as a forward. He ended his career in 2021.

== Club career ==
Jerković played in the French and Belgian lower divisions before signing a contract with Lithuainian club Žalgiris. In June 2010, during a league game against Šiauliai, he suffered serious injuries to his cruciate ligament and meniscus that put him out of action for half a year. He recovered from an injury in the 2011 season and extended his contract with Žalgiris, but soon afterwards the contract was terminated by mutual agreement.

During the off-season, he moved to rival A Lyga club Tauras Tauragė.

On 24 December 2011, he joined Esteghlal. He made his debut for Esteghlal against Shahrdari Yasuj in the Hazfi Cup. On 10 January 2012, he score his first goal for Esteghlal in his first start against Damash. His 91st-minute goal against Al-Rayyan in AFC Champions League helped Esteghlal earn a vital away victory. He also converted the winning penalty in 2012 Hazfi Cup Final.

In the summer of 2015, following spells with Thai clubs Buriram United, Bangkok Glass (loan) and Army United, he moved to Serbia and signed with Jagodina. He made only nine appearances before he was on the move again with brief stays at a number of clubs before signing for East Riffa of the Bahraini Premier League in January 2019.

On 12 November 2019 he signed with Italian club Calcio Foggia 1920 S.S.D. However, for administrative reasons, he was not qualified to play until 1 January 2020 so, instead, he joined Laotian side Lao Toyota FC without having made an official appearance for Foggia.

== Statistics ==
Last Update 20 November 2017

Club performance			League		Cup		Continental		Total	
Season	Club	League	Apps	Goals	Apps	Goals	Apps	Goals	Apps	Goals
Iran			League		Hazfi Cup		Asia		Total	
2011–12	Esteghlal	Iran Pro League	15	6	2	0	8	3	25	9
2016–17	Siah Jamegan	Iran Pro League	11	4	1	0	0	0	12	4
2017–18	Siah Jamegan	Iran Pro League	7	1	0	0	0	0	7	1
Total	Iran		33	11	3	0	8	3	44	14
Total	Country		33	11	3	0	8	3	44	14

== Honours ==
Esteghlal

- Hazfi Cup (1) : 2011–12

Buriram United

- Thai FA Cup (1) : 2012
- Thai League Cup (1): 2012
- Thai FA Cup (1) : 2012 top score

East Riffa Club

- Federation Cup (1) : 2019
