= Amjad Shokouh Magham =

Iranian footballer

Personal information
- Full name: Amjad Shokouh Magham
- Date of birth: September 22, 1983 (age 43)
- Place of birth: Sanandaj, Iran
- Position: Midfielder

Senior career*
Years	Team	Apps	(Gls)
2004–2006	Sanat Naft		
2006–2008	Saba Qom	33	(1)
2008–2010	Aboomoslem	49	(1)
2010–2012	Shahin	56	(3)
2012–2013	Aluminium	27	(1)
2013–2014	Padideh	16	(1)
- * Club domestic league appearances and goals as of 10 May 2013

Amjad Shokouh Maghahm (Persian: امجد شکوه مقام; born September 22, 1983) is an Iranian football midfielder.

== Career ==
Shokouh Magham joined Aluminium in summer 2012.

=== Club career statistics ===
As of 10 May 2014

Club	Division	Season	League		Hazfi Cup		Asia		Total	
Club	Division	Season	Apps	Goals	Apps	Goals	Apps	Goals	Apps	Goals
Saba Qom	Pro League	2006–07	12	0			–	–		
Saba Qom	Pro League	2007–08	21	1			–	–		
Aboomoslem	Pro League	2008–09	24	1			–	–		
Aboomoslem	Pro League	2009–10	25	0			–	–		
Shahin	Pro League	2010–11	30	2			–	–		
Shahin	Pro League	2011–12	26	1			–	–		
Aluminium	Pro League	2012–13	27	1	0	0	–	–	27	1
Padideh	Division 1	2013–14	16	1	2	0	–	–	18	1
Career total			171	7			0	0		
