= Hafezieh Stadium =

Stadium in Shiraz, Iran

Hafeziyeh Stadium (official name)
- Hafeziyeh Sport Complex
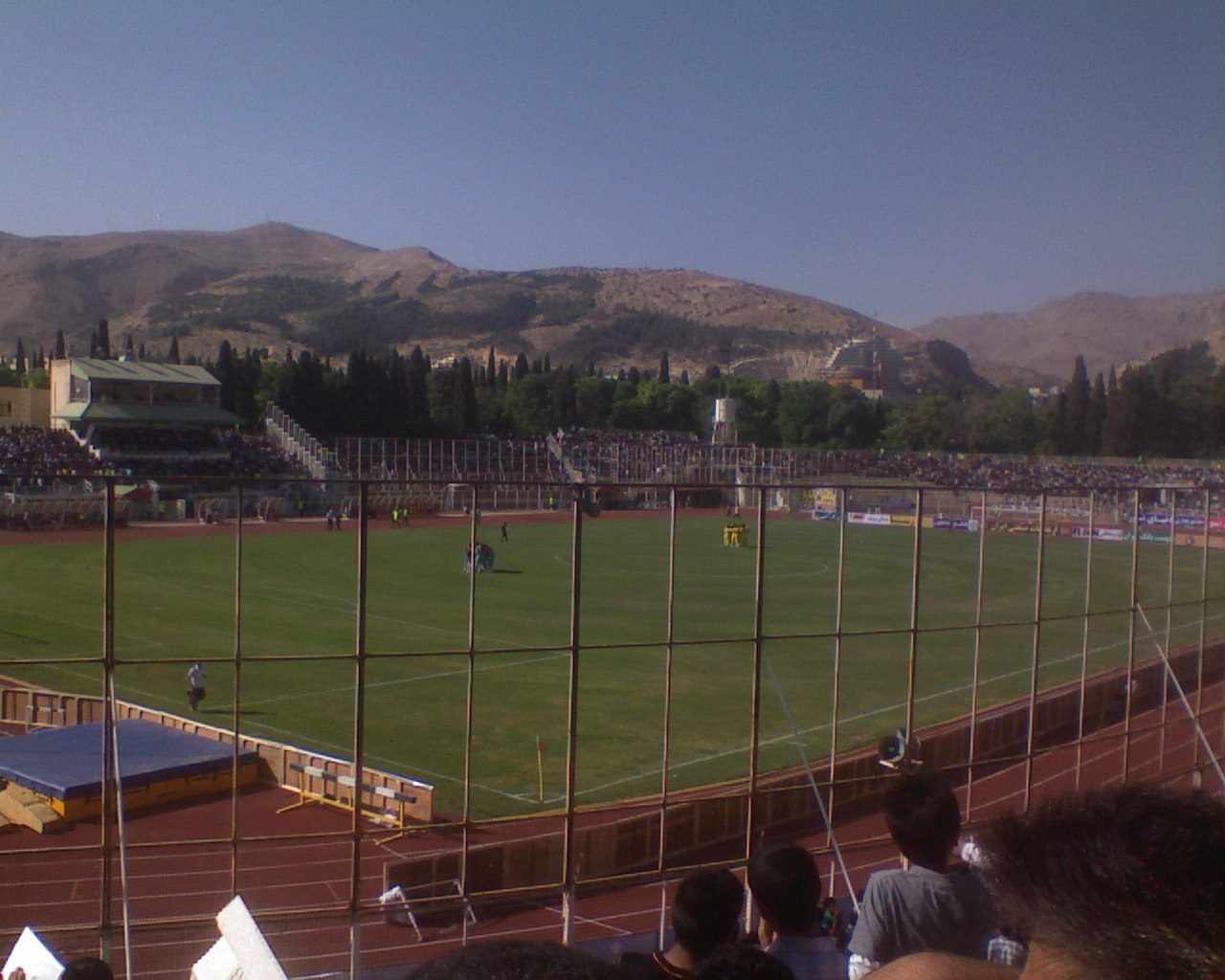
- Interactive map of Hafeziyeh Stadium (official name)
- Full name: Hafezieh Stadium
- Location: Shiraz, Iran
- Coordinates: 29°37′26″N 52°33′22″E
- Owner: Ministry of Sport and Youth (Iran)
- Capacity: 20,000
- Surface: Grass
- Scoreboard: 104m² Jumbotron
- Field size: 105 m × 75 m (344 ft × 246 ft)

Construction
- Built: 1 March 1945
- Opened: 2 January 1946
- Renovated: 1972, 2009, 2012
- Architect: Reza Mahabadi

Tenants
- Fajr Sepasi (1988–2012, 2013– ) Bargh Shiraz (1946–1985, 2008–2012)

The Hafeziyeh Stadium (Persian: ورزشگاه حافظیه) is a multi-purpose stadium in Shiraz, Iran. It is currently used mostly for football matches and is the home stadium of Persian Gulf League side, Fajr Sepasi F.C. The stadium also is used for some matches of Bargh Shiraz F.C. in Azadegan League. The stadium holds 20,000 people and is all-seater. The stadium was the host venue of 2012 Hazfi Cup Final.

== Background ==
In 1940, Iran's then Prime Minister Mohammad-Ali Foroughi visited Shiraz and proposed a project for Shiraz to make a bid for holding the 1976 AFC Asian Cup with Shiraz as second host city. The operation of the venue was officially begun on 1 March 1945 and after near ten months, the stadium was opened in January 1946.

Hafezieh stadium has been renovated twice, firstly in 1972 to make venue ready for the Asian Cup, which later was cancelled when Tabriz's Bagh Shomal Stadium was made second host because of its greater capacity. The second renovation began in 2009 and the capacity of the venue was upgraded from 20,000 to 22,000 seated.

== Notable matches ==
The match between Fajr Sepasi and Bargh Shiraz in 2001–02 Iran Pro League was named the Shiraz's most attendance match with a 20,984 fans watching the match. The stadium also held four Hazfi Cup finals. The first was during 2000–01 Hazfi Cup. Fajr faced Zob Ahan and won the first leg 1-0 in Isfahan. The second leg was held in Hafezieh and Fajr won 2-1, leading to winning the title for the first time. Fajr was also a finalist in the 2001–02 Hazfi Cup, faced Esteghlal in first leg in Shiraz. It ended with a 2-1 win for Esteghlal which helped them win the title with a 2-2 draw in second leg. Fajr also qualified to the final of 2002–03 Hazfi Cup, another final with Zob Ahan but it was a loss for Fajr. The first leg held in Isfahan & they draw(2-2). The second leg was in hafezie stadium & again they draw(2-2) but one of them should win that match so in penalties Zob Ahan won(6-5). The final of the 2011–12 Hazfi Cup was also held at this stadium but Fajr wasn't a finalist. Esteghlal beat Shahin Bushehr 4-1 on penalties on 15 March 2012 in a single match.

== Balloon Festival ==
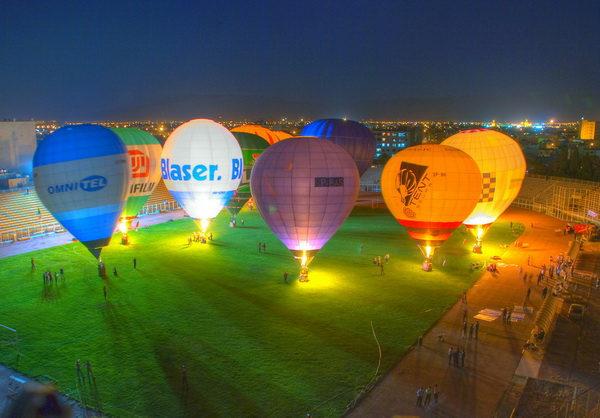
Shiraz's Ballon Festival, 2010

On the occasion of the Shiraz week, 12 hot air balloon flew at the same time across the city for the first time in Shiraz.

== Renovation ==
After the criticisms about 2012 Hazfi Cup finals held in Hafezieh because of bad grass at winter, the grass of the stadium was improved for the start of the 2012 Iran Pro League season.

== See also ==
- List of association football stadia by capacity
- Football in Iran
- Azadi Stadium
- Shiraz Stadium
