= Mehrdad Hosseini =

Iranian footballer

Personal information
- Full name: Mehrdad Mohammad Hosseini
- Date of birth: 8 February 1989 (age 37)
- Place of birth: Tehran, Iran
- Height: 1.84 m (6 ft 0 in)
- Position: Goalkeeper

Youth career
- 2005–2008: Sanat Naft
- 2008–2009: Paykan
- 2009–2010: Persepolis
- 2011–2012: Esteghlal

Senior career*
Years	Team	Apps	(Gls)
2009–2011	Persepolis	0	(0)
2010–2011	→ Fajr Sepasi (loan)	2	(0)
2011–2014	Esteghlal	0	(0)
2012–2014	Esteghlal II	15	(1)
- * Club domestic league appearances and goals

Mehrdad Mohammad Hosseini (Persian: مهرداد محمد حسینی; born 8 February 1989) is an Iranian former football goalkeeper.

== Honours ==
=== Club ===
Esteghlal

- Iran Pro League (1): 2012–13
  - Runner up (1): 2010–11
- Hazfi Cup (1): 2011–12
