= Mehdi Eslami (footballer, born 1985) =

Iranian football goalkeeper

Personal information
- Full name: Seyed Mehdi Eslami Shahrbabaki
- Date of birth: 5 May 1985 (age 41)
- Place of birth: Tehran, Iran
- Height: 1.94 m (6 ft 4 1/2 in)
- Position: Goalkeeper

Youth career
- 2006–2008: Esteghlal

Senior career*
| Years | Team | Apps | (Gls) |
| 2008–2011 | Pas Hamedan | 13 | (0) |
| 2011–2012 | Shahrdari Bandar Abbas | 8 | (0) |
| 2012 | Esteghlal | 0 | (0) |
| 2012–2015 | Gostaresh | 30 | (0) |
| 2015 | Aluminium Arak | 18 | (0) |
| 2015–2017 | Machine Sazi | 30 | (0) |
| 2017–2018 | Baadraan | 32 | (0) |
| 2018–2019 | Mes Kerman | 15 | (0) |
| 2019–2020 | Sepidrood | 8 | (0) |
| 2020 | Navad Urmia | 2 | (0) |
| 2020–2021 | Machine Sazi | 4 | (0) |
| 2021–2022 | Shahrdari Astara | 0 | (0) |
| Total | | 160 | (0) |
- * Club domestic league appearances and goals as of 26 July 2022

Seyed Mehdi Eslami (Persian: مهدی اسلامی, born May 5, 1985, in Iran) is an Iranian former footballer.

== Club career ==
=== Club career statistics ===
As of 29 August 2014

| Club performance | | | League | | Cup | | Continental | | Total | |
| Season | Club | League | Apps | Goals | Apps | Goals | Apps | Goals | Apps | Goals |
| Iran | | | League | | Hazfi Cup | | Asia | | Total | |
|---|---|---|---|---|---|---|---|---|---|---|
| 2008–09 | Pas Hamedan | Pro League | 0 | 0 | 0 | 0 | – | – | 0 | 0 |
| 2009–10 | Pas Hamedan | Pro League | 4 | 0 | 0 | 0 | – | – | 4 | 0 |
| 2010–11 | Pas Hamedan | Pro League | 9 | 0 | 0 | 0 | – | – | 9 | 0 |
| 2011–12 | Sh. Bandar Abbas | Division 1 | 8 | 0 | 0 | 0 | – | – | 8 | 0 |
| 2011–12 | Esteghlal | Pro League | 0 | 0 | 0 | 0 | 0 | 0 | 0 | 0 |
| 2012–13 | Gostaresh | Pro League | 19 | 0 | 2 | 0 | – | – | 21 | 0 |
| 2013–14 | Gostaresh | Pro League | 5 | 0 | 1 | 0 | – | – | 6 | 0 |
| 2014–15 | Gostaresh | Pro League | 6 | 0 | 0 | 0 | – | – | 6 | 0 |
| Career total | | | 56 | 0 | 3 | 0 | 0 | 0 | 59 | 0 |

== Honours ==
=== Club ===
Esteghlal

- Hazfi Cup (1): 2011–12
