= Hossein Alavi =

Iranian footballer

Personal information
- Full name: Seyed Hossein Alavi-Moghaddam
- Date of birth: 25 February 1989 (age 37)
- Place of birth: Mashhad, Iran
- Position: Forward

Youth career
- Aboumoslem

Senior career*
Years	Team	Apps	(Gls)
2009–2010	Aboumoslem	0	(0)
2010–2011	Payam Mashhad	0	(0)
2011–2012	Tarbiat Yazd	1	(0)
2012	Esteghlal	0	(0)
- * Club domestic league appearances and goals

Hossein Alavi (Persian: حسین علوی) is an Iranian football player He has just played 13 minutes in his entire career before joining Esteghlal which made his signing heavily criticised by media. It has been reported that a member of The Iranian Parliament had pressured Ali Fathollahzadeh to sign Alavi, which he rejects.
