= Jacques Elong Elong =

Cameroonian footballer (1985–2025)

Personal information
- Full name: Jacques Aurelien Elong Elong
- Date of birth: 20 February 1985
- Place of birth: Douala, Cameroon
- Date of death: 31 March 2025 (aged 40)
- Height: 1.78 m (5 ft 10 in)
- Position: Defensive midfielder

Youth career
- 2000–2001: Caïman de Douala
- 2006: Persepolis

Senior career*
| Years | Team | Apps | (Gls) |
| 2001–2003 | Caïman de Douala | | |
| 2003–2005 | Mount Cameroon | | |
| 2005–2008 | Persepolis | 29 | (0) |
| 2008–2009 | Sepahan | 5 | (0) |
| 2009–2011 | DAC Dunajská Streda | 12 | (0) |
| 2010–2011 | → Paykan (loan) | 14 | (2) |
| 2012 | Esteghlal | 5 | (0) |
| 2012–2014 | Natf Maysan | 34 | (6) |

International career
| 2006 | Cameroon | 1 | (0) |
- * Club domestic league appearances and goals

Jacques Aurelien Elong Elong (20 February 1985 – 31 March 2025) was a Cameroonian professional football player who played as a defensive midfielder.

== Club career ==
Elong Elong was a versatile player, able to serve in defence but also assist in goal scoring. His brilliant passing abilities made him a regular in Persepolis, playing in the defensive midfield position. He also shot well, especially from outside the penalty spot, though he never scored for Persepolis.

In 2006 Elong received an offer from Qatari club Al-Sadd, but he rejected it since he had just got a permanent place on the Persepolis team and was enjoying his life in Iran. Afshin Ghotbi, then manager of the club, also confirmed that none of his players were for sale.

Despite rumours of Elong leaving for either Spartak Moscow or Esteghlal in the summer of 2007 Elong remained at Persepolis for the 2007–08 season and emerged as a crucial player for the team and told IRIB television that he has no willingness to play abroad. His speech saying "I am loving Tehran, and I can not see myself anywhere else within the next six years at least."

Elong Elong joined Esteghlal in 2012.

== International career ==
Elong Elong debuted for the Cameroon national team in an African Nations Cup qualifier against Equatorial Guinea on 7 October in Yaoundé, he appeared as a substitute replacing AS Nancy's Landry N'Guémo in the 90th minute in the 3–0 victory. Arie Haan, his former coach at Persepolis F.C., gave him a spot in the national team. He was capped once for Cameroon national football team.

== Personal life and death ==
Elong Elong was born on 20 February 1985. He died as the result of a traffic collision on 31 March 2025, at the age of 40.

== Career statistics ==
Appearances and goals by club, season and competition
| Club | Season | League | | | Cup (Note: Includes Hazfi Cup, Slovak Cup.) | | Continental | | Total | |
| Club | Season | Division | Apps | Goals | Apps | Goals | Apps | Goals | Apps | Goals |
|---|---|---|---|---|---|---|---|---|---|---|
| Persepolis | 2005–06 | Persian Gulf Cup | 2 | 0 | 5 | 0 | – | | 7 | 0 |
| Persepolis | 2006–07 | Persian Gulf Cup | 18 | 0 | 2 | 0 | – | | 20 | 0 |
| Persepolis | 2007–08 | Persian Gulf Cup | 9 | 0 | 1 | 0 | – | | 10 | 0 |
| Persepolis | 2008–09 | Persian Gulf Cup | 0 | 0 | 0 | 0 | 0 | 0 | 0 | 0 |
| Persepolis | Total | | 29 | 0 | 8 | 0 | 0 | 0 | 37 | 0 |
| Sepahan | 2008–09 | Persian Gulf Cup | 5 | 0 | 0 | 0 | 2 | 0 | 7 | 0 |
| Dunajská Streda | 2009–10 | Slovak Superliga | 12 | 0 | | | – | | | |
| Dunajská Streda | 2010–11 | Slovak Superliga | 0 | 0 | | | – | | | |
| Dunajská Streda | Total | | 12 | 0 | | | 0 | 0 | | |
| Paykan | 2010–11 | Persian Gulf Cup | 13 | 2 | 0 | 0 | – | | 13 | 2 |
| Esteghlal | 2011–12 | Persian Gulf Cup | 5 | 0 | 0 | 0 | 0 | 0 | 5 | 0 |
| Career total | | | | | | | | | | |

== Honours ==
Persepolis

- Iran's Premier Football League: 2007–08

Esteghlal

- Hazfi Cup: 2011–12
