= Mostafa Seifi =

Iranian footballer

Personal information
- Full name: Mostafa Seifi
- Date of birth: 22 October 1985 (age 41)
- Place of birth: Qazvin, Iran
- Position: Midfielder

Youth career
- 1999–2005: Rah Ahan

Senior career*
Years	Team	Apps	(Gls)
2005–2006	Rah Ahan	3	(0)
2007–2008	Esteghlal Ahvaz	29	(1)
2008–2012	Mes Kerman	83	(3)
2012–2013	Naft Tehran	2	(0)
- * Club domestic league appearances and goals as of 6 August 2012

Mostafa Seifi (born October 22, 1985) is an Iranian footballer who most recently plays for Naft Tehran in the IPL.

== Club career ==
Seifi joined Mes Kerman F.C. in 2008 from Esteghlal Ahvaz F.C.

Club performance			League		Cup		Continental		Total	
Season	Club	League	Apps	Goals	Apps	Goals	Apps	Goals	Apps	Goals
Iran			League		Hazfi Cup		Asia		Total	
2005–06	Rah Ahan	Pro League	3	0			-	-		
2007–08	Esteghlal Ahvaz	Pro League	29	1			-	-		
2008–09	Mes Kerman	Pro League	17	0			-	-		
2009–10	Mes Kerman	Pro League	16	0			6	1		
2010–11	Mes Kerman	Pro League	24	1	0	0	-	-	24	1
2011–12	Mes Kerman	Pro League	26	2	0	0	-	-	26	2
2012–13	Naft Tehran	Pro League	2	0	0	0	-	-	2	0
Career total			117	4			6	1		

- Assist Goals

Season	Team	Assists
09–10	Mes Kerman	2
10–11	Mes Kerman	2
