= Ali Hamoudi =

Iranian footballer

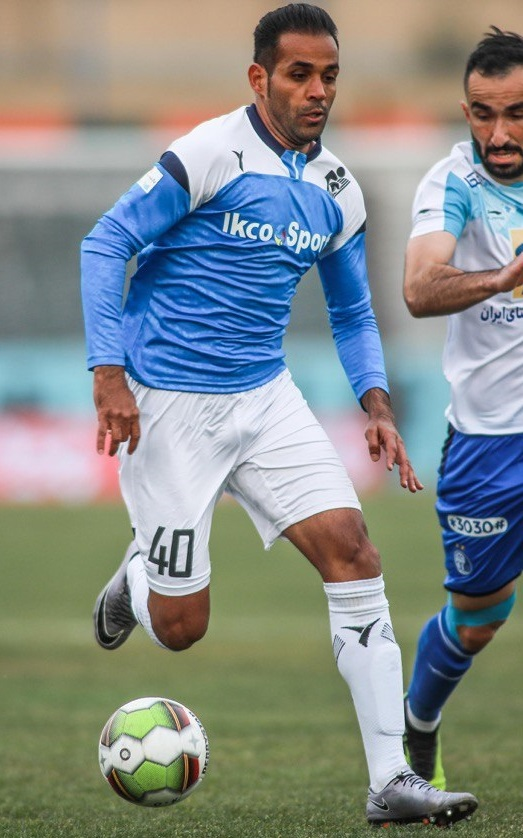

Personal information
- Date of birth: 21 March 1986 (age 40)
- Place of birth: Ahvaz, Iran
- Height: 1.80 m (5 ft 11 in)
- Position: Right back

Youth career
- Esteghlal Ahvaz

Senior career*
Years	Team	Apps	(Gls)
2005–2008	Esteghlal Ahvaz	70	(3)
2008–2009	Mes Kerman	31	(0)
2009–2011	Foolad	67	(1)
2011–2013	Esteghlal	57	(1)
2013–2016	Sepahan	32	(1)
2015–2016	→ Tractor (loan)	16	(1)
2016–2020	Paykan	75	(1)
2020–2021	Shahin Bushehr	28	(0)
2021–2022	Esteghlal Khuzestan	18	(1)
2022–2024	Esteghlal Mollasani	57	(0)

International career
2007	Iran U23	6	(0)
2008–2010	Iran	2	(0)
- * Club domestic league appearances and goals

Ali Hamoudi (Persian: على حمودى; born 21 March 1986) is an Iranian former football defender.

== Club career ==
=== Club career statistics ===
As of 19 August 2014

Club performance			League		Cup		Continental		Total	
Season	Club	League	Apps	Goals	Apps	Goals	Apps	Goals	Apps	Goals
Iran			League		Hazfi Cup		Asia		Total	
2005–06	Esteghlal; Ahvaz	Pro League	13	1			-	-		
2006–07	Esteghlal; Ahvaz	Pro League	23	0			-	-		
2007–08	Esteghlal; Ahvaz	Pro League	34	2			-	-		
2008–09	Mes	Pro League	31	0			-	-		
2009–10	Foolad	Pro League	33	0	1	0	-	-	34	0
2010–11	Foolad	Pro League	34	1	3	0	-	-	37	1
2011–12	Esteghlal	Pro League	26	1	3	0	3	0	32	1
2012–13	Esteghlal	Pro League	31	0	4	0	7	0	42	0
2013–14	Sepahan	Pro League	28	1	1	0	6	0	35	1
2014–15	Sepahan	Pro League	4	0	0	0	0	0	4	0
2015–16	Tractor	Pro League	10	1	0	0	0	0	10	1
2015–16	Sepahan	Pro League	0	0	0	0	0	0	0	0
Total	Iran		198	5			4	0		
Career total			198	5			4	0		

- Assist Goals

Season	Team	Assists
05–06	Esteghlal Ahvaz	1
07–08	Esteghlal Ahvaz	4
08–09	Mes	5
10–11	Foolad	1
11–12	Esteghlal	2
12–13	Esteghlal	4
13–14	Sepahan	0
14–15	Sepahan	0

== Honours ==
=== Country ===
- WAFF Championship Winner: 1
  - 2008

=== Club ===
- Iran's Premier Football League
  - Winner: 1
    - 2012–13 with Esteghlal
  - Runner up: 1
    - 2006–07 with Esteghlal Ahvaz
- Hazfi Cup
  - Winner: 1
    - 2011–12 with Esteghlal
