= Milad Meydavoudi =

Iranian football player

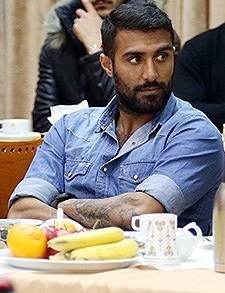
- Meydavoudi in 2017

Personal information
- Full name: Milad Meydavoudi
- Date of birth: 20 January 1985 (age 41)
- Place of birth: Masjed Soleyman, Iran
- Height: 1.78 m (5 ft 10 in)
- Positions: Striker; winger

Team information
- Current team: Esteghlal (assistant)

Youth career
- 2000–2004: Esteghlal Ahvaz
- 2005: Pas

Senior career*
Years	Team	Apps	(Gls)
2004–2010	Esteghlal Ahvaz	83	(25)
2005–2006	→ Pas (loan)	23	(5)
2007–2008	→ Al-Ahli (loan)	15	(4)
2008–2009	→ Al-Ahli (loan)	17	(4)
2010–2013	Esteghlal	58	(17)
2013	Aluminium	17	(4)
2013–2014	Esteghlal Khuzestan	29	(5)
2014–2016	Saipa	41	(10)
2016–2017	Rah Ahan	9	(2)
2017	Siah Jamegan	6	(0)
2017–2019	Naft Masjed Soleyman	47	(9)
Total		325	(83)

International career^{‡}
2004	Iran U20	3	(1)
2007	Iran U23	7	(1)
2007–2011	Iran	29	(7)

Managerial career
- 2019: Shahrdari Bam (assistant)
- 2020: Khosheh Talaei (assistant)
- 2021–2022: Esteghlal Khuzestan (assistant)
- 2022–2024: Ettehad Kohgiloyeh
- 2024–2025: Naft Masjed Soleyman (assistant)
- 2025: Be'sat Kermanshah (assistant)
- 2025: Navad Urmia (assistant)
- 2025: Be'sat Kermanshah (assistant)
- 2025–2026: Be'sat Kermanshah
- 2026–: Esteghlal (assistant)
- * Club domestic league appearances and goals as of 12 February 2016 ‡ National team caps and goals as of 20 December 2011

Milad Meydavoudi (Persian: میلاد میداوودی; born 20 January 1985) is an Iranian football coach and former player who played as a striker and winger. He is currently an assistant coach at Esteghlal.

Meydavoudi began his professional playing career with Esteghlal Ahvaz in 2004. He later played for Pas, Al-Ahli, Esteghlal, Aluminium, Esteghlal Khuzestan, Saipa, Rah Ahan, Siah Jamegan, and Naft Masjed Soleyman. At international level, he represented Iran from 2007 to 2011, making 29 appearances and scoring seven goals.

== Club career ==
Meydavoudi started his career at Esteghlal Ahvaz with whom he made his professional debut in 2004. He was brought to Esteghlal Ahvaz by Nasser Hejazi from youth team. In the next season he played for Pas Tehran because of army services and quickly emerged as a promising youngster, before moving back to Esteghlal Ahvaz for the 2006–07 season.

On 1 February 2008 Meydavoudi signed a 4-month loan contract with UAE League side Al-Ahli for a transfer fee of $600,000.

On 8 February 2008 Meydavoudi signed a 2.5-year contract extension with Esteghlal Ahvaz which kept him at the Takhti Stadium until 2010. But on 22 September 2008 he signed a 1-year contract with Al-Ahli for a transfer fee of $1,000,000. In 2010, he joined Esteghlal where he scored two goals in his debut. In November 2010, Meydavoudi was injured possibly for the remainder of the 2010–11 season. In winter 2013, Meydavoudi joined Aluminium returning with his former coach Parviz Mazloomi. After Aluminium's relegation to the Azadegan League, he joined Esteghlal Khuzestan. On 1 June 2014 he joined Saipa, signing a two-year contract on 19 June 2014.

=== Club career statistics ===
As of 15 May 2015

Club performance			League		Cup		Continental		Total	
Season	Club	League	Apps	Goals	Apps	Goals	Apps	Goals	Apps	Goals
Iran			League		Hazfi Cup		Asia		Total	
2003–04	Esteghlal Ahvaz	Pro League	5	1			–	–		
2004–05	Esteghlal Ahvaz	Pro League	2	1			–	–		
2005–06	Pas Tehran	Pro League	23	5				0		
2006–07	Esteghlal Ahvaz	Pro League	26	4			–	–		
2007–08	Esteghlal Ahvaz	Pro League	18	10			–	–		
United Arab Emirates			League		President's Cup		Asia		Total	
2007–08	Al Ahli	Pro League	15	4			–	–		
Iran			League		Hazfi Cup		Asia		Total	
2008–09	Esteghlal Ahvaz	Pro League	5	0	0	0	–	–	5	0
United Arab Emirates			League		President's Cup		Asia		Total	
2008–09	Al Ahli	Pro League	17	4	?	1	6	1	?	6
Iran			League		Hazfi Cup		Asia		Total	
2009–10	Esteghlal Ahvaz	Pro League	27	9	0	0	–	–	27	9
2010–11	Esteghlal	Pro League	14	8	2	0	0	0	16	8
2011–12	Esteghlal	Pro League	17	6	4	2	3	0	25	8
2012–13	Esteghlal	Pro League	7	1	0	0	0	0	7	1
2012–13	Aluminium	Pro League	17	4	0	0	–	–	17	4
2013–14	Esteghlal Khuzestan	Pro League	22	5	0	0	–	–	22	5
2014–15	Saipa	Pro League	28	5	1	0	–	–	29	5
2015–16	Saipa	Pro League	12	4	0	0	–	–	12	4
Total	Iran		184	63				0		
Total	United Arab Emirates		32	8			6	1		
Career total			216	71				1		

- Assist Goals

Season	Team	Assists
05–06	Pas	6
06–07	Esteghlal Ahvaz	5
07–08	Esteghlal Ahvaz	4
08–09	Esteghlal Ahvaz	1
09–10	Esteghlal Ahvaz	7
10–11	Esteghlal	1
11–12	Esteghlal	2
12–13	Esteghlal	1
12–13	Aluminium	6
13–14	Esteghlal Khuzestan	2
14–15	Saipa	0

== International career ==
He was a member of Iran national under-20 football team at the 2004 AFC Youth Championship. He was called up to the Iran national football team in June 2007 for the West Asian Football Federation Championship 2007. He made his debut for Team Melli in Iran's first match against Iraq. He scored his first national goal in Iran's second match against Palestine.

=== International goals ===
Scores and results list Iran's goal tally first.

#	Date	Venue	Opponent	Score	Result	Competition
1	20 June 2007	Amman International Stadium, Jordan	Palestine	1–0	2–0	2007 WAFF
2	11 August 2008	Takhti Stadium, Tehran	Qatar	1–0	6–1	2008 WAFF
3	11 August 2008	Takhti Stadium, Tehran	Qatar	6–1	6–1	2008 WAFF
4	28 December 2009	Jassim Bin Hamad Stadium, Doha	Qatar	1–2	2–3	Qatar Friendship Cup
5	28 September 2010	Amman International Stadium, Jordan	Oman	1–0	2–2	2010 WAFF
6	3 October 2010	Amman International Stadium, Jordan	Kuwait	1–2	1–2	2010 WAFF
7	15 November 2011	Gelora Bung Karno Stadium, Indonesia	Indonesia	1–0	4–1	2014 WCQ

== Honours ==
=== Club ===
Pas Tehran

- Iran Pro League Runner-up: 2005–06

Esteghlal Ahvaz

- Iran Pro League Runner-up: 2006–07

Al-Ahli

- UAE Pro League: 2008–09

Esteghlal

- Iran Pro League Runner-up: 2010–011
- Hazfi Cup: 2011–12

=== Country ===
Iran

- WAFF Championship: 2007
- WAFF Championship: 2008
