= Mohsen Yousefi (footballer, born 1984) =

Iranian footballer

Personal information
- Date of birth: 26 May 1984 (age 42)
- Place of birth: Amol, Iran
- Height: 1.80 m (5 ft 11 in)
- Position: Midfielder

Senior career*
Years	Team	Apps	(Gls)
2005–2006	Shamoushak	23	(2)
2006–2008	Esteghlal	38	(3)
2008–2009	Saba Qom	32	(3)
2009−2012	Esteghlal	34	(2)
2012	Saipa	7	(0)
2012–2013	Naft Tehran	12	(1)
2013–2015	Malavan	54	(7)
2015–2018	Padideh	54	(12)
2018–2019	Machine Sazi	19	(2)

International career
2007	Iran	1	(0)
- * Club domestic league appearances and goals

Mohsen Yousefi (Persian: محسن یوسفی, born 26 May 1984) is an Iranian former footballer.

== Club career ==
Yousefi has played with Esteghlal from 2009 until 2012.

=== Club career statistics ===
Club performance			League		Cup		Continental		Total	
Season	Club	League	Apps	Goals	Apps	Goals	Apps	Goals	Apps	Goals
Iran			League		Hazfi Cup		Asia		Total	
2004–05	Shamoushak	Pro League	0	0			-	-		
2005–06	Shamoushak	Pro League	23	2			-	-		
2006–07	Esteghlal	Pro League	23	2			-	-		
2007–08	Esteghlal	Pro League	15	1	2	1	-	-	17	2
2008–09	Saba Qom	Pro League	32	3			4	1		
2009–10	Esteghlal	Pro League	13	0			5	0		
2010–11	Esteghlal	Pro League	7	0	2	0	0	0	9	0
2011–12	Esteghlal	Pro League	14	2	3	2	4	0	21	4
2012–13	Saipa	Pro League	7	0	0	0	-	-	7	0
2012–13	Naft	Pro League	12	1	0	0	-	-	12	1
2013–14	Malavan	Pro League	27	1	0	0	-	-	27	1
2014–15	Malavan	Pro League	27	6	1	0			28	6
Career total			200	18			14	0		

== Honours ==
=== Club ===
- Iran's Premier Football League
  - Runner up: 1
    - 2010/11 with Esteghlal
- Hazfi Cup
  - Winner: 1
    - 2011/12 with Esteghlal
