= Tohid Gholami =

Iranian footballer

Personal information
- Date of birth: December 22, 1991 (age 34)
- Place of birth: Tehran, Iran
- Height: 1.82 m (6 ft 0 in)
- Position: Midfielder

Youth career
- 2004–2010: Esteghlal

Senior career*
Years	Team	Apps	(Gls)
2010–2012	Esteghlal	10	(59)
2012–2013	Parseh	17	(4)
2013–2014	Shahrdari Bandar Abbas	22	(3)
2014–2016	Niroo Zamini	10	(0)
2016–2017	Naft Tehran	10	(1)
2017–2018	Sepidrood	23	(1)
2018–2019	Machine Sazi	11	(0)
- * Club domestic league appearances and goals as of 5 September 2018

Tohid Gholami (Persian: توحید غلامی, December 22, 1991) is an Iranian football midfielder, who plays for Sepidrood Rasht S.C. in Iran's Premier League football.

== Club career ==
He played for Esteghlal in the 2010–11 season.

== Career statistics ==
As of 21 July 2014

Club performance			League		Cup		Continental		Total	
Season	Club	League	Apps	Goals	Apps	Goals	Apps	Goals	Apps	Goals
Iran			League		Hazfi Cup		Asia		Total	
2010–11	Esteghlal	Pro League	3	0	0	0	0	0	1	0
2011–12	Esteghlal	Pro League	10	0	0	0	0	0	6	0
2012–13	Parseh Tehran	Azadegan; League	17	4	1	0	–	–	18	4
2013–14	Shahrdari Bandar Abbas	Azadegan; League	22	3	0	0	–	–	22	3
Career total			41	7	1	0	0	0	42	7

== Honours ==
- Iran's Premier Football League
  - Runner up: 1
    - 2010–11 with Esteghlal
- Hazfi Cup
  - Winner: 1
    - 2011–12 with Esteghlal
- Hazfi Cup
  - Winner: 1

2016–17 with Naft Tehran
