= Meysam Hosseini =

Iranian footballer

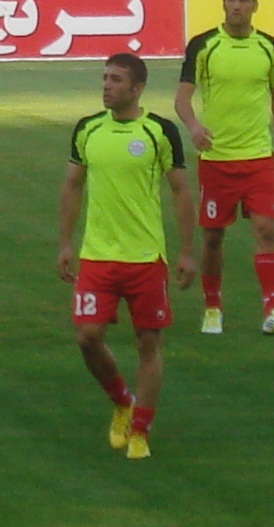

Personal information
- Full name: Seyed Meysam Hosseini Kandeskalaei
- Date of birth: 7 June 1987 (age 39)
- Place of birth: Nowshahr, Iran
- Height: 1.78 m (5 ft 10 in)
- Position: Left back

Youth career
- 2001–2006: Shamoushak

Senior career*
Years	Team	Apps	(Gls)
2006–2009	Shamoushak		
2009–2011	Gostaresh Foulad	42	(0)
2011–2012	Esteghlal	38	(2)
2012–2013	Naft Tehran	15	(0)
2013–2015	Persepolis	40	(0)
2015–2017	Siah Jamegan	49	(2)
2019–2021	Shahrdari Noshahr		
2021–2022	Shahrvand Ramsar		
2022–2023	Nika Pars Chaloos		
- * Club domestic league appearances and goals

Meysam Hosseini (Persian: میثم حسینی; born 7 June 1987) is an Iranian former professional footballer who played as a defender. He usually played as a left back.

Hosseini was born in the city of Nowshahr and played youth football with local club Shamoushak before moving to Gostaresh in 2009. He moved to Tehran-based club Esteghlal in 2011, where he won the Hazfi Cup, until joining Naft Tehran. Hosseini joined Persepolis on a two-year contract in 2013 and signed for Siah Jamegan Khorasan F.C. in 2015 after his contract expired.

== Club career ==
=== Shamoushak ===
In 2006, Hosseini started his career with Shamoushak at youth levels.

=== Gostaresh ===
After three seasons with Shamoushak, he joined Gostaresh in summer 2009. He helped Gostaresh reach the 2010 Hazfi Cup Final.

=== Esteghlal ===
After good performances in the Azadegan League and Hazfi Cup matches, he joined Persian Gulf League side Esteghlal with a two-year contract. He helped the club win the Hazfi Cup during his first season. In his second season, he was mostly benched and moved to Naft Tehran during the winter transfer window.

=== Naft Tehran ===
On 29 December 2012, he moved to Naft Tehran as part of Iman Mousavi deal. He played in 15 matches and received two yellow cards.

=== Persepolis ===
He signed a two-years contract with Persepolis on 3 June 2013.

=== Siah Jamegan ===
Following the expiration of his contract, Hosseini joined recently promoted club Siah Jamegan in 2015.

=== Club career statistics ===
As of 11 December 2014

Club	Division	Season	League		Hazfi Cup		Asia		Total	
Club	Division	Season	Apps	Goals	Apps	Goals	Apps	Goals	Apps	Goals
2009–10	Gostaresh	Division 1	22	0	8	0	–	–	30	0
2010–11	Gostaresh	Division 1	20	0	2	0	–	–	22	0
2011–12	Esteghlal	Pro League	28	2	3	0	1	0	32	2
2012–13	Esteghlal	Pro League	10	0	0	0	0	0	10	0
2012–13	Naft Tehran	Pro League	15	0	0	0	–	–	15	0
2013–14	Persepolis	Pro League	24	0	2	0	–	–	26	0
2014–15	Persepolis	Pro League	14	0	3	0	0	0	17	0
Career Total			133	2	18	0	1	0	151	2

- Assist Goals

Season	Team	Assists
12–13	Esteghlal	2
12–13	Naft Tehran	1
13–14	Persepolis	0
14–15	Persepolis	0

== Honours ==
=== Club ===
Gostaresh Foolad

- Hazfi Cup runner-up: 2009–10

Esteghlal

- Hazfi Cup: 2011–12

Persepolis

- Iran Pro League runner-up: 2013–14
