= Mehdi Nouri =

Iranian retired footballer (born 1980)

Mehdi Noori
Personal information
- Full name: Mehdi Noori
- Date of birth: 14 February 1980 (age 46)
- Place of birth: Tabriz, Iran
- Position: Midfielder

Youth career
- 1996–1999: Tractor

Senior career*
| Years | Team | Apps | (Gls) |
| 1999–2001 | Fajr Sepah (Conscription) | | |
| 2001–2002 | Bargh Tehran | | |
| 2002–2003 | Naft Abadan | | |
| 2003–2007 | Paykan | 21 | (1) |
| 2007–2008 | Pegah Gilan | 31 | (0) |
| 2008–2009 | Damash Gilan | 32 | (2) |
| 2009–2012 | Shahin Bushehr | 86 | (8) |
| 2012–2014 | Foolad | 40 | (8) |
- * Club domestic league appearances and goals as of 11 April 2014

Mehdi Noori (Persian: مهدی نوری; born February 18, 1980) is an Iranian retired footballer who plays for Foolad in the Iran's Premier Football League.

== Club career ==
Noori joined Shahin Bushehr in 2009 after spending the previous season at Damash Gilan.

=== Club career statistics ===
As of 11 April 2014

| Club performance | | | League | | Cup | | Continental | | Total | |
| Season | Club | League | Apps | Goals | Apps | Goals | Apps | Goals | Apps | Goals |
| Iran | | | League | | Hazfi Cup | | Asia | | Total | |
|---|---|---|---|---|---|---|---|---|---|---|
| 2006–07 | Paykan | Pro League | 21 | 1 | 4 | 0 | - | - | 25 | 1 |
| 2007–08 | Pegah | Pro League | 31 | 0 | 6 | 1 | - | - | 37 | 1 |
| 2008–09 | Damash | Pro League | 32 | 2 | 0 | 0 | - | - | 32 | 2 |
| 2009–10 | Shahin | Pro League | 30 | 1 | | | - | - | | |
| 2010–11 | Shahin | Pro League | 26 | 2 | 1 | 0 | - | - | 27 | 2 |
| 2011–12 | Shahin | Pro League | 30 | 5 | 5 | 3 | - | - | 35 | 8 |
| 2012–13 | Foolad | Pro League | 31 | 7 | 1 | 0 | - | - | 32 | 7 |
| 2013–14 | Foolad | Pro League | 9 | 1 | 2 | 0 | 1 | 0 | 12 | 1 |
| Career total | | | 210 | 19 | | | 1 | 0 | | |

== Honours ==
=== Club ===
Pegah Gilan

- Hazfi Cup Runner-up: 2007–08

Shahin Bushehr

- Hazfi Cup Runner-up: 2011–12

Foolad

- Iran Pro League (1): 2013–14
