= Hamid Azizzadeh =

Iranian football defender

Hamid Azizadeh
Personal information
- Full name: Hamid Azizadeh Toroghi
- Date of birth: June 6, 1981 (age 45)
- Place of birth: Esfahan, Iran
- Height: 1.91 m (6 ft 3 in)
- Position: Defender

Youth career
- –2001: Zob Ahan

Senior career*
Years	Team	Apps	(Gls)
2001–2006	Zob Ahan		(8)
2006–2010	Sepahan	68	(2)
2009–2010	→ Mes (loan)	13	(2)
2010–2011	Aluminium	5	(1)
2011–2012	Esteghlal	1	(0)

International career^{‡}
2002	Iran U23		
Medal record
Representing Iran
Asian Games
Gold medal – first place	2002 Busan	Team competition
- * Club domestic league appearances and goals as of 3 May 2010 ‡ National team caps and goals as of August 28, 2008

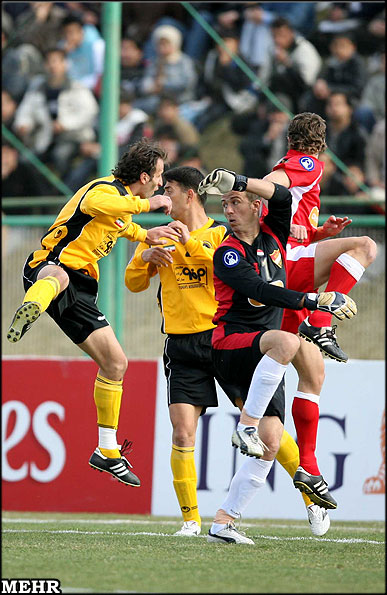
AFC Champions League 2007 Match

Hamid Azizadeh Toroghi (Persian: حمید عزیززاده طرقی, born June 6, 1981) is an Iranian football defender. He currently plays for Esteghlal in the Iran Pro League.

== Club career ==
He started his club career in Zob Ahan where he moved to Sepahan in 2006 and even played in 2007 FIFA Club World Cup for Sepahan. He has been mostly the reserve for Mohsen Bengar and Hadi Aghili.

=== Club career statistics ===
Last Update 24 May 2010

Club performance			League		Cup		Continental		Total	
Season	Club	League	Apps	Goals	Apps	Goals	Apps	Goals	Apps	Goals
Iran			League		Hazfi Cup		Asia		Total	
2001–02	Zob Ahan	Persian Gulf Cup		3			-	-		
2002–03	Zob Ahan	Persian Gulf Cup		2			-	-		
2003–04	Zob Ahan	Persian Gulf Cup		2			5	1		
2004–05	Zob Ahan	Persian Gulf Cup		0			-	-		
2005–06	Zob Ahan	Persian Gulf Cup	15	1			-	-		
2006–07	Sepahan	Persian Gulf Cup	18	2				0		
2007–08	Sepahan	Persian Gulf Cup	20	0		0	4	0		0
2008–09	Sepahan	Persian Gulf Cup	27	0		0	4	1		1
2009–10	Sepahan	Persian Gulf Cup	3	0	0	0	0	0	3	0
2009–10	Mes	Persian Gulf Cup	13	2			2	0		
2010–11	Aluminium Hormozgan	Azadegan	5	0			-	-		
2011–12	Esteghlal	Persian Gulf Cup	1	0	0	0	0	0	1	0
Total	Iran			12				1		
Career total				12				1		

- Assist Goals

Season	Team	Assists
09–10	Mes Kerman	1

== Honours ==
=== Club ===
- Hazfi Cup
  - Winner: 4
    - 2002/03 with Zob Ahan
    - 2006 Final with Sepahan
    - 2006/07 with Sepahan
    - 2011/12 with Esteghlal
