= Hadi Zarrin-Saed =

Iranian footballer

Personal information
- Full name: Hadi Zarrin-Saed
- Date of birth: 25 July 1979 (age 47)
- Place of birth: Tehran, Iran
- Position: Goalkeeper

Team information
- Current team: Badran Tehran

Youth career
- 2005: Persepolis

Senior career*
Years	Team	Apps	(Gls)
2005–2007	Shirin Faraz		
2007–2009	Homa		
2009–2010	Tractor Sazi	1	(0)
2010–2011	Machine Sazi	24	(0)
2011–2012	Esteghlal	1	(0)
2012–2014	Alvand Hamedan	37	(0)
- * Club domestic league appearances and goals as of 24 October 2013

Hadi Zarrin-Saed (Persian: هادی زرین ساعد, July 25, 1979) is an Iranian football goalkeeper, who currently plays for Naft Iranian F.C. in Azadegan League.

== Club career ==
He currently plays for Naft va Gaz Gachsaran F.C. in 2nd division formerly played for Baadran Tehran F.C.

=== Club Career Statistics ===
- Last Update: 25 January 2011

Club performance			League		Cup		Continental		Total	
Season	Club	League	Apps	Goals	Apps	Goals	Apps	Goals	Apps	Goals
Iran			League		Hazfi Cup		Asia		Total	
2009–10	Tractor Sazi	Iran Pro League	1	0	0	0	–	–	1	0
2010–11	Machine Sazi	Azadegan League	24	0	3	0	–	–	27	0
2011–12	Esteghlal	Iran Pro League	1	0	1	0	0	0	2	0
Total	Iran		26	0	4	0	0	0	30	0
Total	Career total		26	0	4	0	0	0	30	0

== Honours ==
=== Club ===
Esteghlal

- Hazfi Cup (1): 2011–12
