= Esmaeil Sharifat =

Iranian footballer (born 1988)

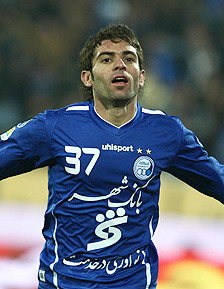
- Sharifat with Esteghlal in 2011

Personal information
- Date of birth: 7 September 1988 (age 38)
- Place of birth: Ramshir, Iran
- Height: 1.66 m (5 ft 5 1/2 in)
- Positions: Forward; winger

Youth career
- 2006–2008: Foolad

Senior career*
Years	Team	Apps	(Gls)
2007–2009	Foolad	30	(1)
2009–2010	Esteghlal Ahvaz	27	(7)
2010–2012	Esteghlal	49	(3)
2012–2017	Foolad	135	(17)
2017–2018	Zob Ahan	12	(1)
2018	Esteghlal Khuzestan	8	(1)
2018–2019	Naft Masjed Soleyman	27	(2)
2019	Paykan	11	(0)
2020	Shahin Bushehr	14	(2)
2020–2024	Aluminium Arak	82	(3)
- * Club domestic league appearances and goals as of 1 June 2024

Esmaeil Sharifat (Persian: اسماعیل شریفات, born 7 September 1988) is an Iranian football player.

== Club career ==
Sharifat began his career with Foolad before joining Esteghlal Ahvaz. He then transferred to Esteghlal. In summer 2012, Sharifat returned to Foolad with signing a three-year contract. On 22 February 2014, he signed a new contract with Foolad until 2018.

=== Club career statistics ===
Last update 15 May 2015

Club performance			League		Cup		Continental		Total	
Season	Club	League	Apps	Goals	Apps	Goals	Apps	Goals	Apps	Goals
Iran			League		Hazfi Cup		Asia		Total	
2007–08	Foolad	Division 1	15	1	4	1	–		19	2
2008–09	Foolad	Pro League	16	0	3	1	–		19	1
2009–10	Esteghlal Ahvaz	Pro League	27	7	1	0	–		28	7
2010–11	Esteghlal	Pro League	20	1	4	1	5	0	29	2
2011–12	Esteghlal	Pro League	15	2	4	2	4	1	23	5
2012–13	Foolad	Pro League	31	5	1	0	–		32	5
2013–14	Foolad	Pro League	27	6	2	1	7	1	36	8
2014–15	Foolad	Pro League	29	3	1	0	6	0	36	3
2015–16	Foolad	Pro League	20	1	1	1	-	-	21	2
2016–17	Foolad	Pro League	26	2	3	1	-	-	28	3
2017-18	Zob Ahan	Pro League	10	1	1	0	-	-	11	1
Career total			186	29	26	8	22	2	255	39

- Assist goals

Season	Team	Assists
08–09	Foolad	2
09–10	Esteghlal Ahvaz	5
10–11	Esteghlal	3
11–12	Esteghlal	3
12–13	Foolad	4
13–14	Foolad	5
14–15	Foolad	7
15–16	Foolad	2
16–17	Foolad	3

== Honours ==
Esteghlal

- Iran Pro League runner-up: 2010–11
- Hazfi Cup: 2011–12

Foolad

- Iran Pro League: 2013–14
