= Ferydoon Zandi =

Iranian footballer

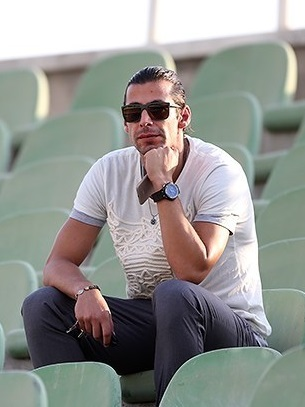
- Zandi in Saipa training in 2015

Personal information
- Full name: Fereydon Zandi
- Date of birth: 26 April 1979 (age 47)
- Place of birth: Emden, West Germany
- Height: 1.85 m (6 ft 1 in)
- Position: Attacking midfielder

Youth career
- 1985–1988: Blau-Weiß Borssum
- 1988–1992: SV Meppen
- 1992–1993: Werder Bremen
- 1993–1995: TuS Esens
- 1995–1998: SV Meppen

Senior career*
Years	Team	Apps	(Gls)
1998–2000	SV Meppen	60	(15)
2000–2001	SC Freiburg II	25	(7)
2000–2002	SC Freiburg	10	(0)
2002–2004	VfB Lübeck	54	(20)
2004–2006	1. FC Kaiserslautern	45	(6)
2006	TuS Koblenz	8	(0)
2007	Apollon Limassol	10	(2)
2008	Olympiakos Nicosia	10	(4)
2008–2009	Alki Larnaca	23	(12)
2009–2011	Steel Azin	41	(2)
2011–2012	Esteghlal	29	(4)
2012–2014	Al Ahli	3	(0)
Total		318	(72)

International career
2001	Germany U21	5	(0)
2005–2009	Iran	29	(5)

Managerial career
- 2016–2020: St. Pauli II (assistant)
- 2020–2022: Dynamo Dresden (assistant)
- * Club domestic league appearances and goals

Ferydoon Zandi (born 26 April 1979) is an Iranian retired professional footballer.

== Early life ==
Zandi was born in the city of Emden, in northern Germany, to an Iranian father and a German mother. He speaks German and Persian. He started playing football at an early age when his talent shone through his playing for a number of youth clubs in and near his hometown.

== Club career ==
=== Germany ===
Zandi was called up for the Germany under-17 national football team and played for SV Meppen before being signed by SC Freiburg. There, he failed to establish himself as a starter and was traded to the 2. Bundesliga club VfB Lübeck. After struggling again initially, Zandi broke through and established himself as one of the most dangerous and versatile attackers of the league. He regularly was one of the top scorers and assist givers.

After enjoying two successful seasons in Lübeck, he was signed by 1. FC Kaiserslautern in 2004 and given the number 10.

In the 2005–06 season, in which 1. FCK fell to the end of the table, he lost his position as a starting playmaker, was benched for a longer period of time, and had periods when he failed to be nominated as a bench player at all. Trainer Wolfgang Wolf refused to play him in the second half of the season, and after the relegation of the club, Zandi was confirmed to be cut from the squad. Also, Amir Ghalenoei, the new manager of Iran national team, did not invite Ferydoon to the Iranian squad for the AFC Asian Cup qualification games.

In September 2006, he signed a one-year contract with 2. Bundesliga club TuS Koblenz, which he left in January 2007 due to the limited number of appearance he made.

=== Cyprus ===
On 2 January 2007, Zandi signed a contract till the end of the 2006–07 season with Apollon Limassol of Cyprus.

After his return from the 2007 AFC Asian Cup he was linked with moves to Steaua București, Rapid București and Birmingham City.

On 18 January 2008, he joined Olympiakos Nicosia.

On 24 March 2009, Zandi signed Alki Larnaca for a one-year contract where he became the top scorer.

=== Iran ===
Zandi joined the Iranian side Steel Azin in 2009 and stayed there for two seasons. After the relegation of Steel Azin he left the club and in August 2011 he joined to Esteghlal but he started season with an injury. On 22 October 2011, he made his debut for Esteghlal and made an assist against Zob Ahan Esfahan F.C. He won the Hazfi Cup in his first season.

Having been released by Esteghlal on 29 September 2012 Zandi joined the Qatari side Al Ahli. On 5 November 2015, he announced his retirement.

== International career ==
Raised in Germany, Zandi did not initially have the permission to play for his ancestral Iran as he did not have Iranian citizenship. However, the Iranian Football Federation obtained permission for him to play for them, and Zandi began to compete on the Iran national team in the second round of 2006 FIFA World Cup qualification against Bahrain. After the qualifications he did not compete again on the team until being invited again for the 2007 AFC Asian Cup.

He was recalled to the national squad in March 2007 for a friendly against Qatar, included in the Asian Cup squad, and was featured for Iran in the friendly match against Mexico in June 2007. On 15 July 2007, Zandi scored from a free kick for Iran in their 2–2 draw versus China in the Asian Cup.

Zandi also played for Iran in the 2010 FIFA World Cup qualification where after the departure of Ali Daei he was not invited for around a year and was invited again by Afshin Ghotbi for a couple of performances but was dropped again. He was invited again after around 18 months by Carlos Queiroz for a friendly in May 2012 against Albania where before the match On 28 May 2012, Zandi announced his retirement from International football.

== Coaching career ==
=== Dynamo Dresden ===
After signing as assistant coach of 2. Bundesliga club Dynamo Dresden in 2020, he was named head coach in March 2022 after Alexander Schmidt was sacked, but was replaced just two days later without managing a match.

== Traffic accident ==
In 2005, Zandi was victim of a heavy traffic accident on a highway. When another car swerved to the left directly in front of him, Zandi had to evade and crashed into a lorry of the United States Air Force. The lorry took heavy damage, and Zandi's car was utterly wrecked. Zandi made it out with minor injuries only.

== Career statistics ==
=== Club ===
Appearances and goals by club, season and competition
Club	Season	League			Cup		Continental		Total		Ref.
Club	Season	Division	Apps	Goals	Apps	Goals	Apps	Goals	Apps	Goals	Ref.
SV Meppen	1998–99	Regionalliga	29	5	0	0	–		29	5	
SV Meppen	1999–00	Regionalliga	31	10	2	0	–		33	10	
SV Meppen	Total		60	15	2	0	–		62	15	–
SC Freiburg II	2000–01	Oberliga	19	7	0	0	–		19	7	
SC Freiburg II	2001–02	Oberliga	6	0	0	0	–		6	0	
SC Freiburg II	Total		25	7	0	0	–		25	7	–
SC Freiburg	2000–01	Bundesliga	7	0	2	0	–		9	0	
SC Freiburg	2001–02	Bundesliga	3	0	1	0	–		4	0	
SC Freiburg	Total		10	0	3	0	–		13	0	–
VfB Lübeck	2002–03	2. Bundesliga	25	6	1	0	–		26	6	
VfB Lübeck	2003–04	2. Bundesliga	29	14	5	3	–		34	17	
VfB Lübeck	Total		54	20	6	3	–		60	23	–
1. FC Kaiserslautern	2004–05	Bundesliga	26	6	2	3	–		28	9	
1. FC Kaiserslautern	2005–06	Bundesliga	19	0	3	1	–		22	1	
1. FC Kaiserslautern	Total		45	6	5	4	–		50	10	–
TuS Koblenz	2006–07	2. Bundesliga	8	0	0	0	–		8	0	
Apollon Limassol	2006–07	Cypriot First Division	10	2			–		10	2	
Olympiakos Nicosia	2007–08	Cypriot First Division	10	4			–		10	4	
Alki Larnaca	2008–09	Cypriot First Division	23	12			–		23	12	
Steel Azin	2009–10	Persian Gulf Pro League	19	1	1	0	–		20	1	
Steel Azin	2010–11	Persian Gulf Pro League	22	1	3	1	–		25	2	
Steel Azin	Total		41	2	4	1	–		45	3	–
Esteghlal	2011–12	Persian Gulf Pro League	21	4	4	0	8	1	33	5	
Esteghlal	2012–13	Persian Gulf Pro League	8	0	0	0	0	0	8	0	
Esteghlal	Total		29	4	4	0	8	1	42	5	–
Al Ahli	2012–13	Second Division	0	0	0	0	–		0	0	
Al Ahli	2013–14	Stars League	3	0	0	0	–		3	0	
Al Ahli	Total		3	0	0	0	–		3	0	–
Career total			318	72	24	8	8	1	350	81	–

=== International ===
Scores and results list Iran's goal tally first, score column indicates score after each Zandi goal.

List of international goals scored by Ferydoon Zandi
No.	Date	Venue	Opponent	Score	Result	Competition
1	28 May 2005	Azadi Stadium, Tehran, Iran	Azerbaijan	1–0	2–1	Friendly
2	15 July 2007	Bukit Jalil Stadium, Kuala Lumpur, Malaysia	China	1–2	2–2	2007 AFC Asian Cup
3	7 June 2008	Khalifa Bin Zayed Stadium, Al Ain, United Arab Emirates	United Arab Emirates	1–0	1–0	2010 FIFA World Cup qualification
4	31 August 2009	Bahrain National Stadium, Riffa, Bahrain	Bahrain	1–2	2–4	Friendly
5	31 August 2009	Bahrain National Stadium, Riffa, Bahrain	Bahrain	2–3	2–4	Friendly

== Honours ==
Esteghlal

- Hazfi Cup: 2011–12
