= Javad Shirzad =

Iranian footballer (born 1982)

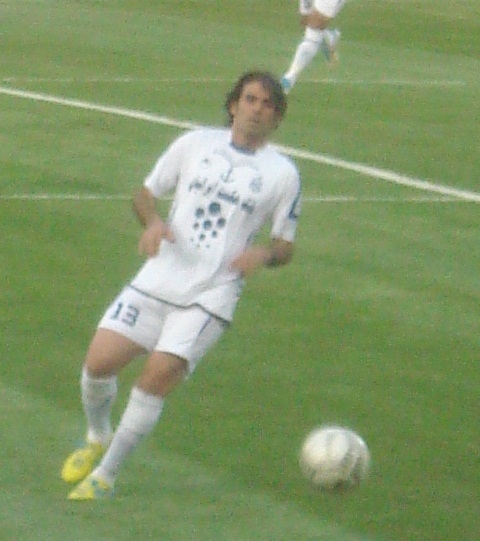
- Shirzad in 2013

Personal information
- Full name: Javad Shirzad
- Date of birth: 20 September 1982 (age 44)
- Place of birth: Bandar Anzali, Iran
- Position: Left back

Team information
- Current team: Malavan
- Number: 13

Senior career*
Years	Team	Apps	(Gls)
2004–2005	Malavan	27	(2)
2005–2007	Pas Tehran	40	(4)
2007–2009	PAS Hamedan	58	(2)
2009–2010	Foolad	31	(3)
2010–2012	Esteghlal	27	(2)
2012–2013	Malavan	30	(0)
2014–2015	Naft Gachsaran	11	

International career
2006–2010	Iran	3	(0)
- * Club domestic league appearances and goals as of 30 April 2013

Javad Shirzad (Persian: جواد شيرزاد, born September 20, 1982) is an Iranian football player. He plays for Malavan. He usually plays in the defender position.

== Club career ==
=== Club Career Statistics ===
Last Update 30 April 2013

Club performance			League		Cup		Continental		Total	
Season	Club	League	Apps	Goals	Apps	Goals	Apps	Goals	Apps	Goals
Iran			League		Hazfi Cup		Asia		Total	
2004–05	Malavan	Pro League	27	2			-	-		
2005–06	Pas Tehran	Pro League	26	4				0		
2006–07	Pas Tehran	Pro League	14	0	1	0	-	-	15	0
2007–08	Pas Hamedan	Pro League	26	0	2	0	-	-	28	0
2008–09	Pas Hamedan	Pro League	32	2	4	1	-	-	36	3
2009–10	Foolad	Pro League	31	3	1	0	-	-	32	3
2010–11	Esteghlal	Pro League	20	0	2	0	5	0	27	0
2011–12	Esteghlal	Pro League	7	1	2	0	0	0	9	1
2012–13	Malavan	Pro League	30	0	1	0	–		31	0
Career total			209	12				0		

- Assist Goals

Season	Team	Assists
06–07	Pas Tehran	1
07–08	Pas Hamedan	2
08–09	Pas Hamedan	7
09–10	Foolad	1
10–11	Esteghlal	1
11–12	Esteghlal	2
12–13	Malavan	3

== Honours ==
=== Club ===
- Iran's Premier Football League
  - Runner up: 1
    - 2010/11 with Esteghlal
- Hazfi Cup
  - Winner: 1
    - 2011/12 with Esteghlal
