= Khosro Heydari =

Iranian footballer (born 1983)

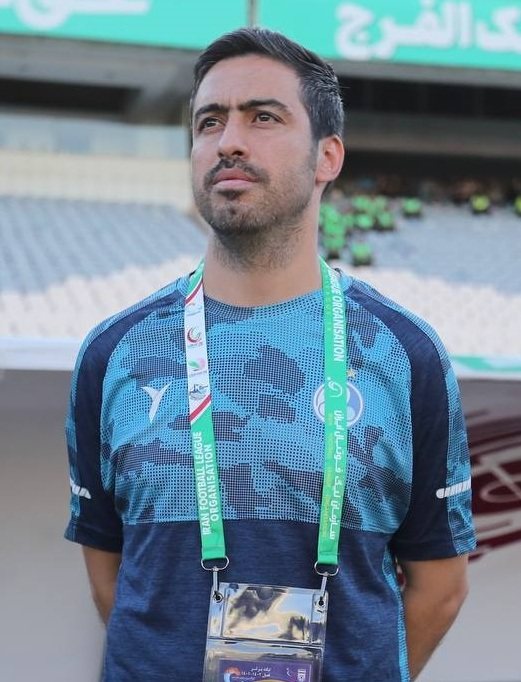
- Khosro Heydari in 2022

Personal information
- Full name: Khosro Heydari
- Date of birth: September 14, 1983 (age 43)
- Place of birth: Tehran, Iran
- Height: 1.74 m (5 ft 9 in)
- Positions: Right back; right midfielder; right winger

Youth career
- 1998–1999: Persepolis
- 1999–2002: Esteghlal

Senior career*
Years	Team	Apps	(Gls)
2002–2004	Aboomoslem	41	(0)
2004–2005	Paykan	29	(1)
2005–2008	Pas	80	(1)
2008–2010	Esteghlal	65	(1)
2010–2011	Sepahan	31	(1)
2011–2019	Esteghlal	162	(2)
Total		408	(6)

International career^{‡}
2006	Iran U23	5	(0)
2007–2015	Iran	60	(0)

Managerial career
- 2022–2023: Esteghlal (assistant)
Medal record
Representing Iran
Asian Games
Bronze medal – third place	2006 Qatar	Team competition
- * Club domestic league appearances and goals as of 12 January 2016 ‡ National team caps and goals as of 9 October 2026

Khosro Heydari (Persian: خسرو حیدری, born September 14, 1983) is a retired Iranian football player who mostly played as a defender for Esteghlal.

== Club career ==
After his excellent performances for Pas he finally accepted the offer from Esteghlal F.C. and was one of the key players in 2008–09 for Esteghlal F.C. to win the league. He continued his excellent performances the season after and was the most influential player of the team. He left Esteghlal F.C. in 2010, joining Sepahan with a 2-year contract. He won the league with Sepahan and was transferred back to Esteghlal F.C. on 23 July 2011 on a two-year deal and won the Hazfi Cup in his first season and Iran Pro League next season. He extended his contract with Esteghlal on 13 July 2013, keeping him at the club until 2016. On 19 June 2016, he signed another three-year contract extension, keeping him at the club through 2019. He announced he will be retired from football at the end of the 2018–19 season. He played his last game for Esteghlal in a 2–1 win against Sepidrood on 16 May 2019.

=== Club career statistics ===
As of 16 ِMay 2019

Club performance			League		Cup		Continental		Total	
Season	Club	League	Apps	Goals	Apps	Goals	Apps	Goals	Apps	Goals
Iran			League		Hazfi Cup		Asia		Total	
2002–03	Aboomoslem	Iran Pro League	7	0	0	0	–	–	7	0
2003–04	Aboomoslem	Iran Pro League	6	0	0	0	–	–	6	0
2004–05	Paykan	Iran Pro League	29	1	1	1	–	–	29^{1}	1^{1}
2005–06	Pas Tehran	Iran Pro League	22	1	1	1	–	–	22^{1}	1^{1}
2006–07	Pas Tehran	Iran Pro League	25	0	2	1	–	–	27	1
2007–08	Pas Hamedan	Iran Pro League	31	0	3	0	–	–	34	0
2008–09	Esteghlal	Iran Pro League	33	1	1	0	6	0	40	1
2009–10	Esteghlal	Iran Pro League	32	0	1	0	7	0	40	0
2010–11	Sepahan	Iran Pro League	31	1	2	0	7	0	40	1
2011–12	Esteghlal	Iran Pro League	26	0	1	0	5	2	32	2
2012–13	Esteghlal	Iran Pro League	30	1	4	0	7	1	41	2
2013–14	Esteghlal	Iran Pro League	18	0	2	0	8	1	28	1
2014–15	Esteghlal	Iran Pro League	24	1	3	0	–	–	27	1
2015–16	Esteghlal	Iran Pro League	18	0	3	0	–	–	21	0
2016–17	Esteghlal	Iran Pro League	17	0	2	0	7	0	26	0
2017–18	Esteghlal	Iran Pro League	15	0	4	1	6	0	25	1
2018–19	Esteghlal	Iran Pro League	6	0	0	0	3	0	9	0
Career total			370	6	30	4	56	4	456	14

^{1} Statistics Incomplete.

- Assist goals

Season	Team	Assists
05–06	Pas Tehran	3
06–07	Pas Tehran	2
07–08	Pas Hamedan	7
08–09	Esteghlal	7
09–10	Esteghlal	13
10–11	Sepahan	5
11–12	Esteghlal	2
12–13	Esteghlal	4
13–14	Esteghlal	5
14–15	Esteghlal	4
15–16	Esteghlal	6
16–17	Esteghlal	2

== International career ==
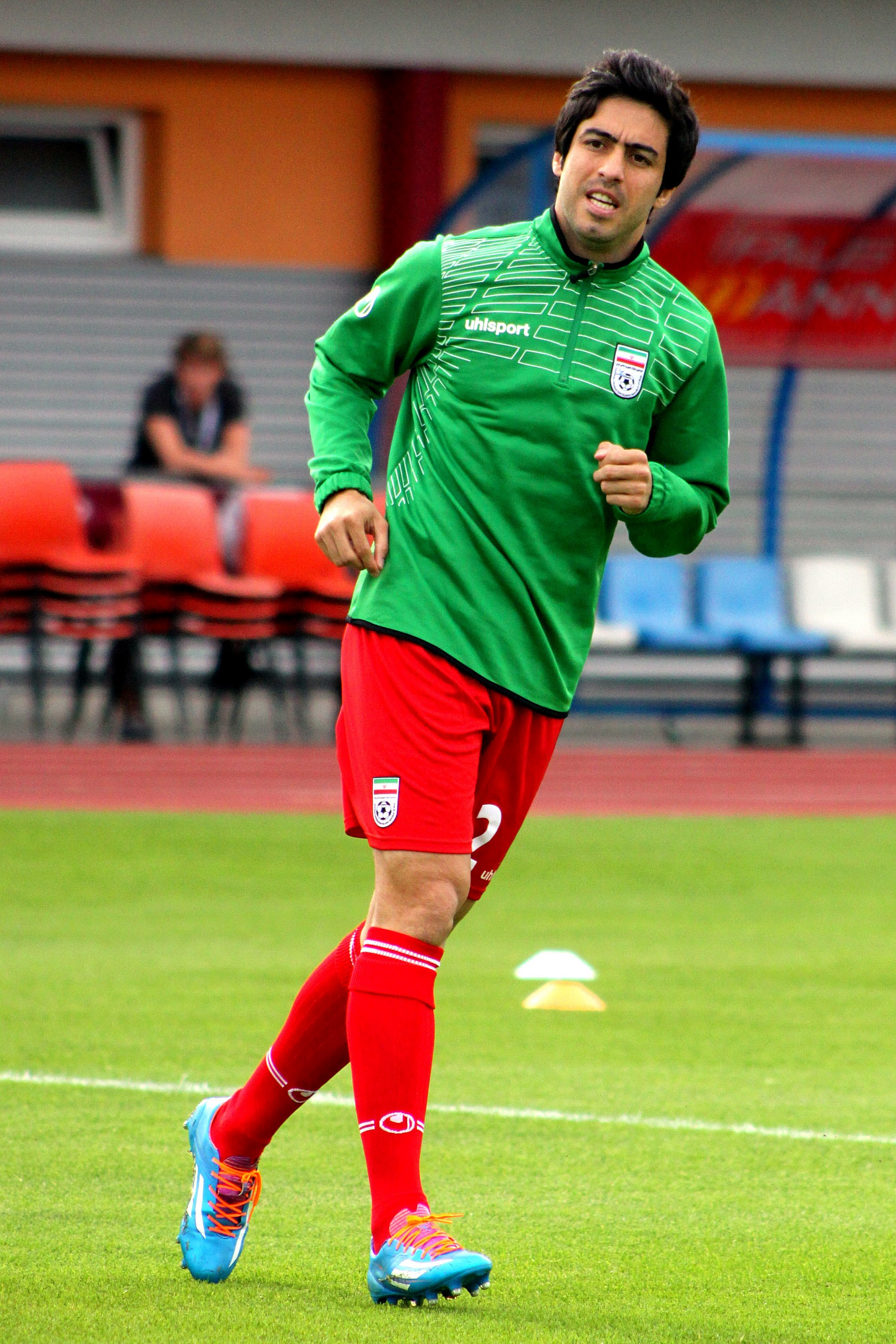
Heydari in a pre-World Cup warmup match

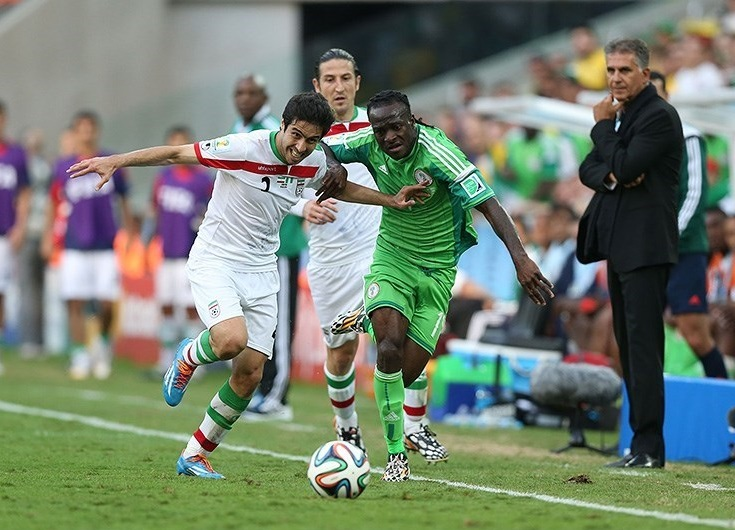
Heydari playing for Iran against Nigeria in 2014 World Cup

Khosro Heydari was a member of Iran national under-23 football team, participating in the 2006 Asian Games. He was called up to the senior squad in June 2007 for the West Asian Football Federation Championship 2007. He made his debut for Iran in a match vs Palestine. He played in 2010 FIFA World Cup qualification and 2014 FIFA World Cup qualification for Team Melli. He also featured in 2011 AFC Asian Cup qualification and 2015 AFC Asian Cup qualification. He performed for Team Melli in West Asian Football Federation Championship 2010, 2011 Asian Cup, 2014 World Cup and 2015 Asian Cup.

=== International caps ===
Iran
Year	Apps	Goals
2007	1	0
2009	10	0
2010	11	0
2011	11	0
2012	7	0
2013	5	0
2014	8	0
2015	6	0
Total	59	0

== Honours ==
=== Club ===
Pas

- Iran Pro League: 2005–06 (Runner-up)

Esteghlal

- Iran Pro League: 2008–09, 2012–13
- Hazfi Cup: 2011–12, 2017–18

Sepahan

- Iran Pro League: 2010–11
