= 2016–17 Esteghlal F.C. season =

Esteghlal F.C.
2016–17 season
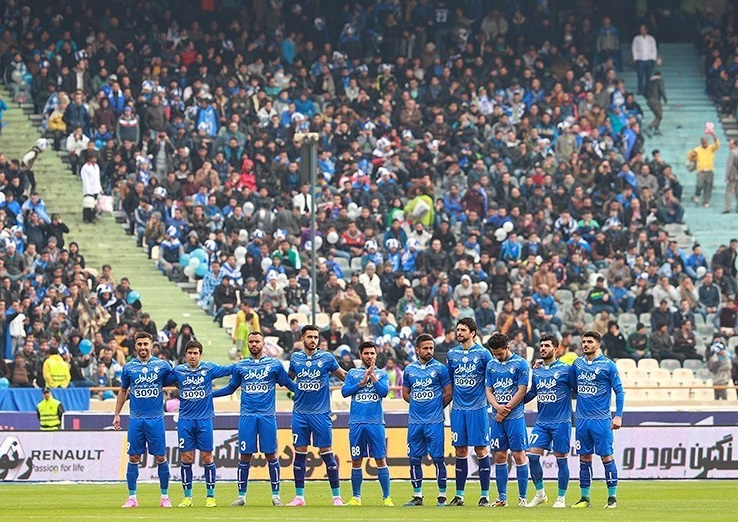
- President: Reza Eftekhari
- Head coach: Ali Reza Mansourian
- Stadium: Azadi Stadium
- Iran Pro League: 2nd
- Hazfi Cup: Quarter-finals
- AFC Champions League: Round of 16
- Top goalscorer: League: Kaveh Rezaei (7 goals); All: Kaveh Rezaei (13 goals)
- Highest home attendance: 77,560 v Persepolis (12 February 2017)
- Lowest home attendance: 0 v Naft Tehran (25 July 2016) (spectator ban)
- Average home league attendance: 32,500
Home colours	Away colours

The 2016–17 season is the Esteghlal Football Club's 16th season in the Persian Gulf Pro League, their 23rd consecutive season in the top division of Iranian football, and 71st year in existence as a football club. They also compete in the Hazfi Cup and AFC Champions League.

== Club ==
=== Coaching staff ===
Position	Staff
Head coach	(Iran) Alireza Mansourian
Assistant coach	(Iran) Ali Chini
Assistant coach	(Iran) Mohammad Khorramgah
Assistant coach	(Iran) Saleh Mostafavi
Goalkeeper coach	(Iran) Hamid Babazadeh
Fitness coach	(England) Steven Jones
Physiotherapist	(Iran) Amin Noroozi
Doctor	(Iran) Kaveh Sotoudeh
Analyst	(Iran) Kianoush Forouzesh
Team Manager	(Iran) Mansour Pourheidari

Source: Jam News

=== Other information ===
Chairman	Reza Eftekhari
Deputy Chairman	
Media Officer	Mohammad hossein Zarandi
Director of Football	
Ground (capacity and dimensions)	Azadi Stadium (78,116 / 110x75m)
Training ground	Nasser Hejazi Training Camp

== Kit ==
Kit manufacturer	Sponsor(s)	
Li-Ning (China)	Major Sponsor	Hamrah Avval
Li-Ning (China)	Sleeve	Bimeh Iran
Li-Ning (China)	Back of Shirt	Kosar Credit Institution, Bimeh Iran

Home	Away

== First team squad ==
Last updated: 22 May 2017

No.	Name	Nationality	Position(s)	Since	Date of Birth (Age)	Signed from	Ends	Games	Goals
Goalkeepers
1	Mehdi Rahmati	(Iran)	GK	2015	2 February 1983 (aged 33)	(Iran) Paykan	2019	223	0
19	Arshia Babazadeh	(Iran)	GK	2016	5 November 1995 (aged 21)	(United States) De Anza Force	2017	0	0
22	Hossein Hosseini	(Iran)	GK	2012	30 June 1992 (aged 24)	Youth system	2019	10	0
Defenders
2	Khosro Heydari	(Iran)	RB, RM	2011	14 September 1983 (aged 33)	(Iran) Sepahan	2019	265	7
3	Róbson Januário de Paula	(Brazil)	CB	2016	14 February 1994 (aged 22)	(Brazil) Bahia	2017	35	0
8	Yaghoub Karimi	(Iran)	LM, LB	2014	31 August 1991 (aged 25)	(Iran) Sepahan	2017	60	1
15	Hrayr Mkoyan	(Armenia)	CB, RB, LB	2014	2 September 1986 (aged 30)	(Armenia) FC Shirak	2018	75	0
18	Milad Zakipour	(Iran)	LB	2016	23 November 1995 (aged 21)	(Iran) Naft Tehran	2019	23	0
21	Vouria Ghafouri	(Iran)	RB, RM	2016	20 September 1987 (aged 29)	(Iran) Sepahan	2017	22	0
33	Majid Hosseini	(Iran)	CB, RB, DM	2014	20 June 1996 (aged 20)	Youth system	2017	24	1
90	Leandro Padovani Celin	(Brazil)	CB	2016	21 December 1983 (aged 33)	(Iran) Sepahan	2017	32	2
Midfielders
6	Omid Ebrahimi	(Iran)	DM, CM	2014	16 September 1987 (aged 29)	(Iran) Sepahan	2017	100	28
11	Jaber Ansari	(Iran)	AM, LM, RM	2015	10 January 1987 (aged 29)	(Iran) Gostaresh Foulad	2017	64	16
13	Miad Yazdani	(Iran)	RM, LM	2016	26 August 1992 (aged 24)	(Iran) Sepidrood Rasht	2019	6	0
14	Farshid Bagheri	(Iran)	DM	2016	5 June 1992 (aged 24)	(Iran) Saba Qom	2018	26	2
24	Omid Noorafkan	(Iran)	DM, CM, LB	2015	9 April 1997 (aged 19)	Youth system	2017	30	3
28	Mohsen Karimi	(Iran)	LW, RW	2014	20 September 1994 (aged 22)	Youth system	2018	52	10
74	Mojtaba Haghdoust	(Iran)	AM, LM, RM	2016	22 January 1996 (aged 20)	(Iran) Naft Tehran	2017	23	2
77	Behnam Barzay	(Iran)	RW, LW	2015	11 February 1993 (aged 23)	(Iran) Rah Ahan	2017	50	7
88	Farshid Esmaeili	(Iran)	AM, CM, RM	2015	23 February 1994 (aged 22)	(Iran) Fajr Sepasi	2018	58	4
Forwards
9	Kaveh Rezaei	(Iran)	CF	2016	5 April 1992 (aged 24)	(Iran) Zob Ahan	2017	39	12
17	Ali Ghorbani	(Iran)	CF, RW, LW	2016	18 September 1990 (aged 26)	(Iran) Naft Tehran	2018	39	8
Players transferred during the season
7	Bakhtiar Rahmani	(Iran)	AM, CF, RW, LW	2016	23 September 1991 (aged 25)	(Iran) Naft Tehran	2018	16	1
16	Arash Afshin	(Iran)	CF, RW, LW	2016	21 January 1989 (aged 27)	(Iran) Naft Tehran	2018	6	0
20	Meysam Majidi	(Iran)	LB, LM	2015	25 October 1986 (aged 30)	(Iran) Esteghlal Khuzestan	2017	31	3
55	Mohammad Amin Hajmohammadi	(Iran)	CB	2015	14 February 1991 (aged 25)	(Iran) Naft Tehran	2017	18	1

=== Persian Gulf Pro League squad ===
Note: Flags indicate national team as defined under FIFA eligibility rules; some limited exceptions apply. Players may hold more than one non-FIFA nationality.

No.	Pos.	Nation	Player
1	GK	IRN	Mehdi Rahmati (Captain)
2	DF	IRN	Khosro Heydari (Vice-captain)
3	DF	BRA	Róbson Januário ^{U23}
5	DF	IRN	Hossein Kanaanizadegan ^{U23}
6	MF	IRN	Omid Ebrahimi
8	MF	IRN	Yaghoub Karimi
9	FW	IRN	Kaveh Rezaei
11	MF	IRN	Jaber Ansari
13	MF	IRN	Miad Yazdani
14	MF	IRN	Farshid Bagheri
15	DF	ARM	Hrayr Mkoyan
17	FW	IRN	Ali Ghorbani
18	DF	IRN	Milad Zakipour ^{U23}

No.	Pos.	Nation	Player
19	GK	IRN	Arshia Babazadeh ^{U23}
21	DF	IRN	Vouria Ghafouri
22	GK	IRN	Hossein Hosseini
24	MF	IRN	Omid Noorafkan ^{U21}
28	MF	IRN	Mohsen Karimi ^{U23}
30	DF	IRN	Azim Gök ^{U21}
33	DF	IRN	Majid Hosseini ^{U21}
74	MF	IRN	Mojtaba Haghdoust ^{U21}
77	FW	IRN	Behnam Barzay
88	MF	IRN	Farshid Esmaeili ^{U23}
90	DF	BRA	Leandro Padovani
99	MF	IRN	Alireza Sayyar ^{U23}

- List of Esteghlal squad in Iran league Organization
- [U19 = Under 19 Player | U21 = Under 21 Player | U23 = Under 23 Player]

== New contracts ==
No.	Pos	Name	Age	Contract length	Ends	Date	Source
2	RB	(Iran) Khosro Heydari	32	3 years	2019	19 June 2016	
4	DM	(Iran) Roozbeh Cheshmi	22	3 years	2019	29 June 2016	
6	DM	(Iran) Omid Ebrahimi	28	1 year	2017	3 July 2016	
15	CB	(Armenia) Hrayr Mkoyan	29	2 years	2018	4 July 2016	
22	GK	(Iran) Hossein Hosseini	24	3 years	2019	19 July 2016	

== Transfers ==
=== In ===
==== Summer ====
No.	Pos	Nat.	Name	Age	Moving From	Type	Ends	Date	Source
7	CM	(Iran)	Bakhtiar Rahmani	26	Tractor Sazi	Free transfer	2018	3 June 2016	
14	DM	(Iran)	Farshid Bagheri	24	Saba Qom	Free transfer	2018	4 June 2016	
21	RB	(Iran)	Vouria Ghafouri	28	Sepahan	Free transfer	2017	5 June 2016	
22	GK	(Iran)	Hossein Hosseini	23	Malavan	Loan return	2017	7 June 2016	
19	LB	(Iran)	Milad Zakipour	20	Naft Tehran	Free transfer	2019	8 June 2016	
17	CF	(Iran)	Ali Ghorbani	25	Naft Tehran	Free transfer	2018	9 June 2016	
5	CB	(Iran)	Hossein Kanaanizadegan	22	Persepolis	Free transfer	2018	14 June 2016	
23	CB	(Iran)	Majid Hosseini	19	Rah Ahan	Loan return	2017	16 June 2016	
12	GK	(Iran)	Arshia Babazadeh	21	(United States) De Anza Force	Free transfer		17 June 2016	
9	CF	(Iran)	Kaveh Rezaei	24	Zob Ahan	Free transfer	2017	19 June 2016	
16	CF	(Iran)	Arash Afshin	27	Malavan	Free transfer	2018	20 June 2016	
13	RM	(Iran)	Mi'ad Yazdani	24	Sepidrood Rasht	Free transfer	2019	31 July 2016	
30	CB	(Iran)	Alireza Sayyar	21	Gol Gohar	Free transfer		5 September 2016	
90	CB	(Brazil)	Leandro Padovani	32	Sepahan	Free transfer	2017	6 September 2016	

==== Winter ====
No.	Pos	Nat.	Name	Age	Moving From	Type	Ends	Date	Source
44	AM	(Uzbekistan)	Server Djeparov	34	(Uzbekistan) Lokomotiv Tashkent	Free transfer	2018	15 January 2017	

=== Out ===
==== Summer ====
No.	Pos	Nat.	Name	Age	Moving To	Type	Date	Source
1	GK	(Iran)	Vahid Talebloo	34	Foolad	Released	8 June 2016	
16	AM	(Iran)	Mehdi Momeni	30	Esteghlal Khuzestan	Released	8 June 2016	
14	CF	(Croatia)	Pero Pejić	33	(Albania) FK Kukësi	Released	8 June 2016	
3	DM	(Iran)	Mohammad Reza Khorsandnia	28	Padideh	Released	8 June 2016	
34	RB	(Iran)	Milad Fakhreddini	26	Naft Tehran	End of Contract	8 June 2016	
5	CB	(Iran)	Hanif Omranzadeh	31	Khooneh Be Khooneh	End of Contract	8 June 2016	
9	CF	(Iran)	Arash Borhani	32	Paykan	End of Contract	8 June 2016	
99	RM	(Morocco)	Adil Chihi	28	(Germany) FSV Frankfurt	End of Contract	8 June 2016	
33	GK	(Iran)	Amir Hossein Najafi	19	Sardar Bukan	Released	17 June 2016	
37	CM	(Iran)	Mohammad Mehdi Rajabifar	18	Moghavemat Tehran	Free transfer	21 June 2016	
17	CM	(Iran)	Milad Shabanloo	21	Sanat Naft	Released	23 June 2016	
19	RM	(Iran)	Alireza Ramezani	23	Tractor Sazi	Free transfer	26 June 2016	
10	CF	(Iran)	Sajjad Shahbazzadeh	26	(Turkey) Alanyaspor	Transfer	20 July 2016	
26	RB	(Iran)	Iman Abbaszadeh	20	Nassaji	Free transfer	15 August 2016	

==== Winter ====
No.	Pos	Nat.	Name	Age	Moving To	Type	Date	Source
16	CF	(Iran)	Arash Afshin	27	Esteghlal Khuzestan	Released	5 January 2017	
7	CM	(Iran)	Bakhtiar Rahmani	25	Foolad	Released	17 January 2017	
55	CB	(Iran)	Mohammad Amin Hajmohammadi	26	Machine Sazi	Released	21 January 2017	
20	LM	(Iran)	Meysam Majidi	30	Saba Qom	Released	25 January 2017	

=== Loan in ===
==== Summer ====
No.	Pos	Nat.	Name	Age	Loaned From	Start	End	Source
3	CB	(Brazil)	Róbson Januário	22	(Brazil) Bahia	24 June 2016	30 June 2017	
74	AM	(Iran)	Mojtaba Haghdoost	20	Naft Tehran	31 August 2016	June 2017	

=== Loan out ===
==== Winter ====
No.	Pos	Nat.	Name	Age	Loaned To	Start	End	Source
44	AM	(Uzbekistan)	Server Djeparov	34	Sepahan	2 February 2017	1 June 2017	
4	DM	(Iran)	Roozbeh Cheshmi	23	Saba Qom	15 February 2017	1 June 2017	

== Friendly Matches ==
=== Pre-season ===
2 July 2016 1	Esteghlal	5–0	Esteghlal B	Tehran, Iran
17:45 (UTC+03:30)	V. Ghafouri 20'; K. Rezaei 35', 38'; F. Bagheri 45'; M. Majidi	report		Stadium: Nasser Hejazi Camp; Attendance: 2,000

8 July 2016 2	Ararat (Armenia)	1–0	(Iran) Esteghlal	Yerevan, Armenia
18:30 (UTC+04:00)	65'	report		Stadium: Yerevan Football Academy; Attendance: 200

14 July 2016 3	Gandzasar Kapan (Armenia)	1–4	(Iran) Esteghlal	Armenia
19:00 (UTC+04:00)	Goal	report	J. Ansari 34', 44', 45'; Y. Karimi 70' (pen.)	Attendance: 50

18 July 2016 4	Esteghlal	3–1	Khooneh Be Khooneh	Tehran, Iran
19:00 (UTC+03:30)	K. Rezaei 18'; J. Ansari; O. Ebrahimi p'	report	R. Bagheri	Stadium: Azadi Football Training Pitches; Attendance: 2,000

=== Mid-season ===
19 August 2016 1	Esteghlal	0–1	PAS Hamedan	Tehran, Iran
18:00 (UTC+03:30)		report	S. Kowsari 19'	Stadium: Azadi Stadium

21 August 2016 2	Esteghlal	1–1	Shahrdari Fouman	Tehran, Iran
18:15 (UTC+03:30)	A. Ghorbani 10'	report	S. Delavar	Stadium: Azadi Stadium

28 August 2016 3	Esteghlal	2–1	Rah Ahan	Tehran, Iran
17:45 (UTC+03:30)	J. Ansari 36'; A. Ghorbani 78'	report	M. Jamshidi 76'	Stadium: Azadi Stadium

4 September 2016 4	Esteghlal	2–0	Saba Qom	Tehran, Iran
17:15 (UTC+03:30)	M. Hosseini 65'; A. Ghorbani 80'	report		Stadium: Azadi Stadium

== Competitions ==
=== Overview ===
Competition	First match	Last match	Starting round	Final position	Record							
Competition	First match	Last match	Starting round	Final position	Pld	W	D	L	GF	GA	GD	Win %
Pro League	25 July 2016	4 May 2017	—	Runners-up	30	16	9	5	45	27	+18	53.33
Hazfi Cup	1 October 2016	20 December 2016	Round of 32	Quarter-Final	4	3	0	1	5	3	+2	75.00
AFC Champions League	7 February 2017	29 May 2017	qualifying play-off	Round of 16	9	5	2	2	12	11	+1	55.56
Total					43	24	11	8	62	41	+21	55.81

Last updated: 12 June 2017.
Source: Competitions

=== Persian Gulf Pro League ===
==== Standings ====
Pos	Team	Pld	W	D	L	GF	GA	GD	Pts	Qualification or relegation
1	Persepolis (C)	30	20	6	4	46	14	+32	66	Qualification for the 2018 AFC Champions League group stage
2	Esteghlal	30	16	9	5	45	27	+18	57	Qualification for the 2018 AFC Champions League group stage
3	Tractor Sazi	30	15	11	4	38	24	+14	56	Qualification for the 2018 AFC Champions League group stage
4	Zob Ahan	30	12	10	8	39	30	+9	46	Qualification for the 2018 AFC Champions League qualifying play-offs
5	Sepahan	30	12	9	9	38	34	+4	45	

Updated to match(es) played on 4 May 2017. Source: IPL Stats, Soccerway
Rules for classification: 1) Points; 2) Goal difference; 3) Goals scored.
(C) Champions

==== Results summary ====
Overall								Home						Away					
Pld	W	D	L	GF	GA	GD	Pts	W	D	L	GF	GA	GD	W	D	L	GF	GA	GD
26	13	9	4	39	23	+16	48	6	4	3	20	16	+4	7	5	1	19	7	+12

Last updated: 7 April 2017.
Source: Ipl Stats

==== Results by round ====
Round	1	2	3	4	5	6	7	8	9	10	11	12	13	14	15	16	17	18	19	20	21	22	23	24	25	26	27	28	29	30
Ground	H	A	H	A	H	A	H	A	H	A	H	A	H	H	A	A	H	A	H	A	H	A	H	A	H	A	H	A	A	H
Result	D	L	L	D	D	D	W	W	W	D	D	W	L	W	D	W	L	W	W	W	W	W	D	W	W	D	W	L	W	W
Position	7	12	15	15	14	15	10	7	5	5	6	5	7	7	7	5	6	4	4	3	3	3	3	3	2	2	2	3	2	2

Updated to match(es) played on 7 April 2017. Source: "Ipl".
A = Away; H = Home; W = Win; D = Draw; L = Loss

==== Matches ====
Win Draw Loss Postponed

25 July 2016 1	Esteghlal	1–1	Naft Tehran	Tehran
20:45 IRDT (UTC+04:30)	J. Ansari 31'	report	A. Motahari 68'; R. Aliyari (yellow card) 90'	Stadium: Azadi Stadium; Attendance: 0 (spectator ban); Referee: Hossein Zargar

31 July 2016 2	Esteghlal Khuzestan	2–1	Esteghlal	Ahvaz
20:45 IRDT (UTC+04:30)	H. Beyt Saeed 25', 84'	report	K. Rezaei 77'	Stadium: Ghadir Stadium; Attendance: 10,000; Referee: Mouood Bonyadifar

5 August 2016 3	Esteghlal	1–2	Sanat Naft	Tehran
20:30 IRDT (UTC+04:30)	A. Ghorbani 66'	report	H. Baghlani (yellow card) 58' (goal) 90+3' (pen.); K. Gwi-hyeon (yellow card) 66'; R. Norouzi 86'	Stadium: Azadi Stadium; Attendance: 55,000; Referee: MohammadReza Akbarian

11 August 2016 4	Paykan	1–1	Esteghlal	Shahr-e Qods
18:15 IRDT (UTC+04:30)	A. Sadeghi (yellow card) 7'; S. Nemati (yellow card) 33'; M. Aghakhan 40' (yellow card) 40'; M. Shiri (yellow card) 88'	report	B. Rahmani (yellow card) 36'; R. Januário (yellow card) 42'; B. Barzay 82'; H. Mkoyan (yellow card) 83'	Stadium: Shahr-e Qods Stadium; Attendance: 8,360; Referee: Reza Kermanshahi

11 September 2016 5	Esteghlal	1–1	Machine Sazi	Tehran
18:45 IRDT (UTC+04:30)	K. Rezaei 7'	report	S. Narimanjahan 52'; A. Amir Kamdar (yellow card) 81'	Stadium: Azadi Stadium; Attendance: 15,000

16 September 2016 6	Persepolis	0–0	Esteghlal	Tehran
17:00 IRDT (UTC+04:30)	A. Alipour (yellow card) 21'	report	O. Ebrahimi (yellow card) 13'; F. Bagheri (yellow card) 69'; K. Heydari (yellow card) 89'	Stadium: Azadi Stadium; Attendance: 75,000; Referee: Alireza Faghani

20 September 2016 7	Esteghlal	2–1	Zob Ahan	Tehran
19:30 IRDT (UTC+04:30)	K. Rezaei (yellow card) 37'; O. Ebrahimi 43' (pen.); A. Ghorbani 48'	report	M. Tabrizi 64'; M. Hosseini (yellow card) 78'	Stadium: Azadi Stadium; Attendance: 35,000; Referee: Hamid Haj Malek

15 October 2016 8	Siah Jamegan	0–1	Esteghlal	Mashhad
15:30 IRST (UTC+03:30)	M. Khanzadeh (yellow card) 66'; A. Kalantari (yellow card) 90+1'	report	K. Rezaei 27'; O. Khaledi (yellow card) 88'	Stadium: Samen Stadium; Attendance: 15,700; Referee: Seyed Reza Mahdavi

21 October 2016 9	Esteghlal	2–0	Saipa	Tehran
16:45 IRST (UTC+03:30)	M. Karimi 76'; J. Ansari 82'; L. Padovani (yellow card) 88'	report	O. Khaledi (yellow card) 32'	Stadium: Azadi Stadium; Attendance: 25,000; Referee: Mouood Bonyadifar

27 October 2016 10	Foolad	1–1	Esteghlal	Ahvaz
16:40 IRST (UTC+03:30)	J. Ansari 35'; F. Esmaeili (yellow card) 44'; L. Padovani (yellow card) 69'	report	A. Nasseri (yellow card) 64'; S. Ansari 77'; Y. Vakia (yellow card) 83'	Stadium: Ghadir Stadium; Attendance: 25,000; Referee: Mohsen Torky

25 November 2016 11	Esteghlal	2–2	Gostaresh	Tehran
16:20 IRST (UTC+03:30)	M. Hosseini 14' (o.g.); M. Karimi 23'	report	L. Pereira 43'; F. de Jesus (red card) 74'; A. Naghizadeh 80'	Stadium: Azadi Stadium; Attendance: 10,000; Referee: Mohammad Hossein Zahedifar

1 December 2016 12	Saba Qom	0–2	Esteghlal	Qom
16:20 IRST (UTC+03:30)	R. Enayati (yellow card) 8' (yellow-red card) 40'; H. Divsalar (red card) 55'; G. Dehnavi (yellow card) 76'; M. Haghjou (yellow card) 86'	report	K. Rezaei 18'; A. Ghorbani 68'; B. Rahmani (yellow card) 80'; Y. Karimi (yellow card) 86'	Stadium: Yadegar-e Emam Stadium; Attendance: 7,000; Referee: Mehdi Seyedali

9 December 2016 13	Esteghlal	1–2	Tractor Sazi	Tehran
15:00 IRST (UTC+03:30)	K. Rezaei 7' (yellow card) 90+3'; O. Ebrahimi (yellow card) 29'; Y. Karimi (yellow card) 83'	report	F. Hatami 56', 68' (yellow card) 77'	Stadium: Azadi Stadium; Attendance: 55,000; Referee: Bijan Heydari

15 December 2016 14	Esteghlal	1–0	Padideh	Tehran
16:20 IRST (UTC+03:30)	J. Ansari 69'	report	M. Kafshgari (yellow card) 54'; A. Jafari (yellow card) 63'	Stadium: Azadi Stadium; Attendance: 6,000; Referee: Vahid Kazemi

25 December 2016 15	Sepahan	1–1	Esteghlal	Isfahan
16:25 IRST (UTC+03:30)	J. Alimohammadi 69'	report	F. Esmaeili (yellow card) 21'; H. Mkoyan (yellow card) 56'; B. Barzay 90+2'	Stadium: Naghsh-e Jahan Stadium; Attendance: 35,000; Referee: Alireza Faghani

12 January 2017 16	Naft Tehran	0–1	Esteghlal	Tehran
16:35 IRST (UTC+03:30)	R. Asadi (yellow card) 12'; V. Hamdinejad (yellow card) 13'; I. Alekasir (yellow card) 22'; M. Farahani (yellow card) 90+3'	report	M. Hosseini (yellow card) 7'; O. Ebrahimi (yellow card) 16' (goal) 59'; H. Hosseini (yellow card) 71'	Stadium: Takhti Stadium; Attendance: 6,854; Referee: Tooraj Haghverdi; Man of the Match: Omid Ebrahimi

17 January 2017 17	Esteghlal	1–2	Esteghlal Khuzestan	Tehran
16:40 IRST (UTC+03:30)	L. Padovani (yellow card) 49'; M. Hosseini (yellow card) 66'; K. Rezaei 88'	report	S. Bahrani (yellow card) 58'; H. Beyt Saeed 68'; A. Alaei (yellow card) 79'; A. Ashouri 83'; M. Tayyebi (yellow card) 90' (yellow-red card) 90+1'	Stadium: Azadi Stadium; Attendance: 0 Referee: Payam Heydari

22 January 2017 18	Sanat Naft	0–3	Esteghlal	Abadan
16:45 IRST (UTC+03:30)	M. Mamashli (yellow card) 82'	report	V. Ghafouri (yellow card) 15'; M. Haghdoust 28'; B. Barzay 56'; M. Hosseini 62'; M. Yazdani (yellow card) 90'	Stadium: Takhti Stadium (Abadan); Attendance: 15,000; Referee: Ashkan Khorshidi; Man of the Match: Omid Ebrahimi

27 January 2017 19	Esteghlal	3–2	Paykan	Tehran
16:45 IRST (UTC+03:30)	O. Ebrahimi 13'; O. Noorafkan 61'; A. Ghorbani 80'; M. Hosseini (yellow card) 85'; F. Esmaeili (yellow card) 90+3'	report	S. Yazdani (red card) 11'; S. Nemati 21' (yellow card) 90+2'; M. Aghakhan (yellow card) 35' (goal) 87.pen'	Stadium: Azadi Stadium; Attendance: 7,000; Referee: Mouood Bonyadifar; Man of the Match: Ali Ghorbani

1 February 2017 20	Machine Sazi	0–3	Esteghlal	Tabriz
17:00 IRST (UTC+03:30)	A. Amir Kamdar (yellow card) 60'; F. Abedini (yellow card) 72'; H. Gordani (yellow card) 80'; M. Hajmohammadi (yellow card) 90+2'	report	L. Padovani (yellow card) 32'; A. Ghorbani 42'; M. Haghdoust 77'; O. Noorafkan 90+2'	Stadium: Yadegar-e Emam Stadium (Tabriz); Attendance: 1,000; Referee: Mohammad Hossein Zahedifar; Man of the Match: Omid Noorafkan

12 February 2017 21	Esteghlal	3–2	Persepolis	Tehran
15:00 IRST (UTC+03:30)	F. Esmaeili 18' (yellow card) 74'; A. Ghorbani 20'; O. Ebrahimi (yellow card) 23'; Róbson (yellow card) 27'; K. Rezaei 44'; M. Rahmati (yellow card) 90+2' (yellow-red card) 90+3'; O. Noorafkan (yellow card) 90+5'; B. Barzay (yellow card) 90+5'	report	S. Rafiei 5'; H. Mahini (yellow card) 39'; J. Hosseini (yellow card) 90+2' (goal) 90+3'; F. Ahmadzadeh (yellow card) 90+5'	Stadium: Azadi Stadium; Attendance: 80,000; Referee: Alireza Faghani

16 February 2017 22	Zob Ahan	0–2	Esteghlal	Isfahan
15:00 IRST (UTC+03:30)	M. Tabrizi (yellow card) 10'; M. Hosseini (yellow card) 80'	report	F. Esmaeili 24'; L. Padovani (yellow card) 29'; B. Barzay 78'; M. Zakipour (yellow card) 88'	Stadium: Foolad Shahr Stadium; Attendance: 15,000; Referee: Mouood Bonyadifar; Man of the Match: F. Esmaeili

5 March 2017 23	Esteghlal	1–1	Siah Jamegan	Tehran
17:25 IRST (UTC+03:30)	O. Ebrahimi 65'; Y. Karimi (yellow card) 66'	Report	G. Jerković 44'; A. Jalali (yellow card) 71'	Stadium: Azadi Stadium; Attendance: 2,000; Referee: Mohammad Hossein Zahedifar; Man of the Match: Mohammad Nasseri

10 March 2017 24	Saipa	1–2	Esteghlal	Tehran
17:30 IRST (UTC+03:30)	E. Pourghaz (yellow card) 81' (goal) 89'; A. Kalantari (yellow card) 88' (yellow-red card) 90+6'	report	M. Hosseini (yellow card) 34'; F. Bagheri 41'; L. Padovani 90+4'	Stadium: Takhti Stadium; Attendance: 5,000; Referee: Mohammad Reza Faghani

31 March 2017 25	Esteghlal	1–0	Foolad	Tehran
IRDT (UTC+04:30)	K.Rezaei (yellow card) 60'; M.Karimi 71'	Report		Stadium: Azadi Stadium; Attendance: 25,000; Referee: Hossein Zargar; Man of the Match: M.Karimi

7 April 2017 26	Gostaresh	1–1	Esteghlal	Tabriz
IRDT (UTC+04:30)	M.Naghizadeh 74'	Report	O. Ebrahimi 80'	Stadium: Bonyan Diesel Stadium; Attendance: 5,000; Referee: Reza Kermanshahi; Man of the Match: Omid Ebrahimi

14 April 2017 27	Esteghlal	2–1	Saba Qom	Tehran
IRDT (UTC+04:30)	O. Ebrahimi 18'; 87'	Report	Keyvan Amraei 28'	Stadium: Azadi Stadium; Attendance: 15,000; Referee: Hamid Hajmalek; Man of the Match: O. Ebrahimi

20 April 2017 28	Tractor Sazi	1–0	Esteghlal	Tabriz
IRDT (UTC+04:30)	Mohammad Ebrahimi 87'	Report	Róbson Januário (yellow card); Omid Ebrahimi (yellow card)	Stadium: Yadegar-e Emam Stadium; Attendance: 45,000; Referee: Ashkan Khorshidi

29 April 2017 29	Padideh	1–2	Esteghlal	Mashhad
IRDT (UTC+04:30)	Moein Abbasian 33'	Report	Omid Noorafkan 57'; Yaghoub Karimi (yellow card) 72'; Jaber Ansari 81'; Ali Ghorbani (yellow card) 89'; Hrayr Mkoyan (yellow card) (red card)	Stadium: Samen Stadium; Attendance: 8,000; Referee: Payam Heydari; Man of the Match: Jaber Ansari

4 May 2017 30	Esteghlal	2–1	Sepahan	Tehran
IRDT (UTC+04:30)	Jaber Ansari 59'; Farshid Bagheri 84'	Report	Mehrdad Mohammadi 39'	Stadium: Azadi Stadium; Attendance: 25000; Referee: Zahedi Fard; Man of the Match: Jaber Ansari

=== Hazfi Cup ===
Win Draw Loss Postponed

1 October 2016 First round	Malavan Novin	0–2	Esteghlal	Bandar-e Anzali
16:10 IRST (UTC+03:30)	Moaf (yellow card) 16'; A. Rahnavard (yellow card) 21'	report	A. Ghorbani 8'; B. Rahmani 27'; Róbson (yellow card) 35'	Stadium: Takhti Stadium; Attendance: 100; Referee: Ali Safaei; Man of the Match: Kaveh Rezaei

31 October 2016 Second round	Esteghlal	1–0	Mes Kerman	Tehran
16:35 IRST (UTC+03:30)	Y. Karimi (yellow card) 107'; M. Karimi 113'	report	M. Ayoubi (yellow card) 28'; Z. Kheiri (yellow card) 87'; F. Hosseinkhani (yellow card) 92'	Stadium: Azadi Stadium; Attendance: 10,000; Referee: Mohammad Reza Faghani

18 November 2016 Round of 16	Esteghlal	0–0 (a.e.t.) (5–3 p)	Saba Qom	Tehran
16:20 IRST (UTC+03:30)	F. Esmaeili (yellow card) 80'; Y. Karimi (yellow card) 97'	report	G. Dehnavi (yellow card) 31'; V. Aliabadi (yellow card) 43'; H. Lak (yellow card) 119'	Stadium: Azadi Stadium; Attendance: 25,000; Referee: Ahmad Salehi
	Penalties
	H. Mkoyan (penalty scored); O. Ebrahimi (penalty scored); A. Ghorbani (penalty scored); Y. Karimi (penalty scored); F. Esmaeili (penalty scored)		K. Amraei (penalty missed); M. Haghjou (penalty scored); G. Dehnavi (penalty scored); M. Abtahi (penalty scored)

20 December 2016 Quarter-finals	Naft Tehran	3–2 (a.e.t.)	Esteghlal	Tehran
16:20 IRST (UTC+03:30)	M. Ghazi 2.pen' 108'; A. Motahari (yellow card) 22'; A. Sadeghi (yellow card) 37'; M. Fakhreddini (yellow card) 90'; I. Mobali (yellow card) 90'; M. Daneshgar (yellow card) 105'; I. Alekasir 106' (yellow card) 106'	report	R. Januário (yellow card) 2'; K. Rezaei (yellow card) 40'; J. Ansari 68'; B. Barzay 92' (yellow card) 96'; M. Zakipour (yellow card) 119'	Stadium: Takhti Stadium (Tehran); Attendance: 3,000; Referee: Ashkan Khorshidi

=== AFC Champions League ===
==== Qualifying play-off ====
Win Draw Loss Postponed

7 February 2017 qualifying play-off	Esteghlal (Iran)	0–0 (a.e.t.) (4–3 p)	(Qatar) Al-Sadd	Tehran
19:00 UTC+3:30	B. Barzay (yellow card) 52'; M. Karimi (yellow card) 106'	report	H. Ismail (yellow card) 45+1'; J. Hamroun (yellow card) 63'	Stadium: Azadi Stadium; Attendance: 74,560; Referee: Ahmed Al-Kaf (Oman)
	Penalties
	K. Rezaei (penalty scored); O. Ebrahimi (penalty missed); A. Ghorbani (penalty scored); F. Esmaeili (penalty scored); K. Heydari (penalty scored)		H. Al-Haidos (penalty scored); Xavi (penalty scored); I. Majid (penalty missed); M. Kasola (penalty missed); B. Bounedjah (penalty scored)

==== Group stage ====
Pos	Team	Pld	W	D	L	GF	GA	GD	Pts	Qualification
1	(United Arab Emirates) Al-Ahli	6	3	2	1	10	5	+5	11 (Note: Head-to-head results: Al-Ahli 2–1 Esteghlal, Esteghlal 1–1 Al-Ahli.)	Advance to knockout stage
2	(Iran) Esteghlal	6	3	2	1	10	5	+5	11	Advance to knockout stage
3	(Saudi Arabia) Al-Taawoun	6	1	2	3	7	12	−5	5 (Note: Head-to-head results: Al-Taawoun 1–0 Lokomotiv Tashkent, Lokomotiv Tashkent 4–4 Al-Taawoun.)	
4	(Uzbekistan) Lokomotiv Tashkent	6	1	2	3	7	12	−5	5	

Source: AFC
Rules for classification: Group stage tiebreakers
Notes:

20 February 2017 1	Al-Ahli (United Arab Emirates)	2–1	(Iran) Esteghlal	Dubai, United Arab Emirates
20:15 UAEST (UTC+04:00)	Majed H. (yellow card) 41'; M. Diop 45+1', 90'; H. Al-Fardan (yellow card) 55'	summary	B. Barzay (yellow card) 10'; Róbson (yellow card) 20'; K. Heydari (yellow card) 57'; O. Ebrahimi 74'; M. Zakipour (yellow card) 85'	Stadium: Al-Rashid Stadium; Attendance: 5,300; Referee: Peter Green (Australia)

27 February 2017 2	Esteghlal (Iran)	3–0	(Saudi Arabia) Al-Taawoun	Muscat, Oman
19:30 UTC+4	K.Rezaei 1'; J.Ansari (yellow card) 55'; M.Karimi 70'; L.Padovani 89'	summary	M.Muaaz (yellow card) 88'; L.Sânmărtean (yellow card) 90+4'	Stadium: Sultan Qaboos Sports Complex; Attendance: 1,050; Referee: Hiroyuki Kimura (Japan)

13 March 2017 3	Esteghlal (Iran)	2–0	(Uzbekistan) Lokomotiv Tashkent	Tehran, Iran
19:00 IRST (UTC+03:30)	Esmaeili 37'; Ghorbani 84'	summary		Stadium: Azadi Stadium; Attendance: 42,369; Referee: Kim Jong-hyeok (South Korea)

11 April 2017 4	Lokomotiv Tashkent (Uzbekistan)	1–1	(Iran) Esteghlal	Tashkent, Uzbekistan
16:00 UST (UTC+05:00)		summary	K.Rezaei 88'	Stadium: Lokomotiv Stadium

25 April 2017 5	Esteghlal (Iran)	1–1	(United Arab Emirates) Al-Ahli	Tehran, Iran
20:15 IRDT (UTC+04:30)	Rezaei 58'	summary	Sanqour 17'	Stadium: Azadi Stadium; Attendance: 76,428; Referee: Jumpei Iida (Japan)

9 May 2017 6	Al-Taawoun (Saudi Arabia)	1–2	(Iran) Esteghlal	Doha, Qatar
18:50 AST (UTC+03:00)	Al-Saiari 36'	summary	Ansari 19'; Rezaei 76'	Stadium: Hamad bin Khalifa Stadium; Attendance: 375; Referee: Hettikamkanamge Perera (Sri Lanka)

==== Knockout stage ====
===== Round of 16 =====
22 May 2017 First leg	Esteghlal (Iran)	1–0	(United Arab Emirates) Al-Ain	Tehran, Iran
20:45 IRDT (UTC+04:30)	Rezaei 90+2' (pen.)	summary		Stadium: Azadi Stadium; Attendance: 67,202; Referee: Fu Ming (China)

29 May 2017 Second leg	Al-Ain (United Arab Emirates)	6–1 (6–2 agg.)	(Iran) Esteghlal	Al Ain, UAE
22:45 UAE (UTC+04:00)	Caio 27', 33'; O. Abdulrahman 49', 60'; Lee Myung-joo 56'; Al-Shamrani 75'	summary	Rezaei 83'	Stadium: Hazza Bin Zayed Stadium; Attendance: 19,006; Referee: Ryuji Sato (Japan)

== Statistics ==
=== Appearances and goals ===
				Pro League						Hazfi Cup						ACL						Total					
No	P	N	Name	S	P			GP	M	S	P			GP	M	S	P			GP	M	S	P			GP	M
1	GK	(Iran)	Mehdi Rahmati	22	22	−21	0	−0.9	1980	4	4	−3	0	−0.6	420	9	9	−11	0	−1.2	840	35	35	−35	0	−1.0	3240
2	RM	(Iran)	Khosro Heydari	17	19	0	3	0.0	1038	2	2	0	0	0.0	140	7	9	0	2	0.0	719	20	22	0	5	0.0	1178
3	CB	(Brazil)	Róbson Januário	19	19	0	0	0.0	1350	3	3	0	0	0.0	330	9	9	0	0	0.0	840	22	22	0	0	0.0	1680
5	CB	(Iran)	Kanaanizadegan	2	2	0	0	0.0	180	0	0	0	0	0.0	0	0	0	0	0	0.0	0	2	2	0	0	0.0	180
6	CM	(Iran)	Omid Ebrahimi	24	24	7	5	0.1	1710	1	2	0	0	0.0	210	7	7	1	1	0.1	624	25	26	8	6	0.1	1920
7	AM	(Iran)	Rahmani	12	13	0	1	0.0	1003	3	3	1	0	0.4	240	0	0	0	0	0.0	0	15	16	1	1	0.1	1243
8	LB	(Iran)	Yaghoub Karimi	11	16	0	0	0.0	1008	2	2	0	0	0.0	240	1	2	0	0	0.0	90	13	15	0	0	0.0	1227
9	CF	(Iran)	Kaveh Rezaei	22	22	7	9	0.3	1607	3	3	0	3	0.0	322	9	9	6	1	0.6	840	27	27	13	13	0.3	1929
11	LW	(Iran)	Jaber Ansari	13	17	6	2	0.3	1127	3	3	1	1	0.3	330	6	2	1	1	0.4	233	17	19	5	4	0.3	1457
13	LW	(Iran)	Mi'ad Yazdani	0	4	0	0	0.0	32	0	1	0	0	0.0	12	0	1	0	0	0.0	2	0	5	0	0	0.0	44
14	DM	(Iran)	Farshid Bagheri	7	15	2	0	0.0	503	3	4	0	0	0.0	360	3	6	0	1	0.4	252	9	19	2	1	0.0	890
15	CB	(Armenia)	Hrayr Mkoyan	12	12	0	2	0.0	1070	3	4	0	0	0.0	380	3	4	0	0	0.0	268	13	14	0	2	0.0	1450
16	CF	(Iran)	Arash Afshin	0	3	0	0	0.0	35	1	3	0	0	0.0	138	0	0	0	0	0.0	0	1	6	0	0	0.0	173
17	CF	(Iran)	Ali Ghorbani	13	21	6	3	0.6	776	2	4	1	1	0.2	368	6	8	1	0	0.2	552	15	26	8	4	0.5	1246
18	LB	(Iran)	Milad Zakipour	9	10	0	1	0.0	449	1	1	0	0	0.0	120	7	8	0	2	0.0	646	11	12	0	2	0.0	569
20	LB	(Iran)	Meysam Majidi	0	1	0	0	0.0	9	1	1	0	0	0.0	90	0	0	0	0	0.0	0	1	2	0	0	0.0	99
21	RB	(Iran)	Vouria Ghafouri	13	14	0	2	0.0	1122	0	0	0	0	0.0	0	5	6	0	0	0.0	344	14	16	0	2	0.0	1122
22	GK	(Iran)	Hossein Hosseini	6	6	−5	0	−1.0	360	0	0	0	0	0.0	0	0	0	0	0	0.0	0	5	5	−4	0	−1.0	360
24	CM	(Iran)	Omid Noorafkan	8	8	2	2	0.3	532	0	0	0	0	0.0	0	6	6	0	0	0.0	570	10	10	2	2	0.3	532
25	CB	(Iran)	Azim Gök	0	1	0	0	0.0	3	0	0	0	0	0.0	0	0	0	0	0	0.0	0	0	1	0	0	0.0	3
28	LM	(Iran)	Mohsen Karimi	5	10	4	0	0.8	327	2	2	1	0	0.4	240	3	7	1	0	0.0	346	6	12	5	0	0.6	567
33	CB	(Iran)	Majid Hosseini	12	13	1	0	0.1	811	2	2	0	0	0.0	210	2	3	0	0	0.0	181	12	14	1	0	0.1	1021
74	AM	(Iran)	Haghdoust	7	13	2	0	0.4	481	3	3	0	0	0.0	228	2	4	0	0	0.0	201	9	15	2	0	0.3	709
77	RW	(Iran)	Behnam Barzay	8	10	4	0	0.6	568	1	3	1	0	0.0	120	3	6	0	0	0.0	283	10	15	5	0	0.6	688
88	AM	(Iran)	Farshid Esmaeili	13	20	2	2	0.0	1039	1	3	0	0	0.0	217	6	8	1	1	0.2	564	15	24	3	3	0.0	1256
90	CB	(Brazil)	Padovani	14	16	1	1	0.0	1023	3	3	0	0	0.0	360	9	9	1	0	0.1	840	19	21	2	0	0.0	1383
Last updated: 1 February 2017

=== Disciplinary record ===
Includes all competitive matches. Players with 1 card or more are included only.

No.	Nat.	Position	Name	Pro League			Hazfi Cup			ACL			Total		
No.	Nat.	Position	Name	Booked	(yellow card) (yellow-red card)	Sent off (straight red)	Booked	(yellow card) (yellow-red card)	Sent off (straight red)	Booked	(yellow card) (yellow-red card)	Sent off (straight red)	Booked	(yellow card) (yellow-red card)	Sent off (straight red)
7	(Iran)	MF	Bakhtiar Rahmani	1	0	0	0	0	0	0	0	0	1	0	0
8	(Iran)	MF	Yaghoub Karimi	1	0	0	0	0	0	0	0	0	1	0	0
15	(Armenia)	DF	Hrayr Mkoyan	1	0	0	0	0	0	0	0	0	1	0	0
TOTALS				3	0	0	0	0	0	0	0	0	3	0	0

Last updated: 11 August 2016.
Source: Competitive matches

=== Top scorers ===
The list is sorted by shirt number when total goals are equal.

Rnk	Pos	No.	Player	Pro League	Hazfi Cup	ACL	Total
1	FW	9	(Iran) Kaveh Rezaei	7	0	6	13
2	MF	6	(Iran) Omid Ebrahimi	7	0	1	8
2	FW	17	(Iran) Ali Ghorbani	6	1	1	8
2	MF	11	(Iran) Jaber Ansari	6	1	1	8
3	FW	28	(Iran) Mohsen Karimi	4	1	1	6
4	FW	77	(Iran) Behnam Barzay	4	1	0	5
5	MF	24	(Iran) Omid Noorafkan	3	0	0	3
5	MF	88	(Iran) Farshid Esmaeili	2	0	1	3
6	MF	74	(Iran) Mojtaba Haghdoust	2	0	0	2
6	MF	14	(Iran) Farshid Bagheri	2	0	0	2
6	DF	90	(Brazil) Leandro Padovani	1	0	1	2
7	DF	33	(Iran) Majid Hosseini	1	0	0	1
7	MF	7	(Iran) Bakhtiar Rahmani	0	1	0	1
Own goals				0	0	0	0
TOTALS				45	5	12	62

Last updated: 3 June 2017.
Source: Competitive matches

=== Clean sheets ===
The list is sorted by shirt number when total clean sheets are equal.

Rnk	No.	Player	Pro League	Hazfi Cup	ACL	Total
1	1	Mehdi Rahmati	8	3	4	15
2	22	Hossein Hosseini	3	0	0	3
TOTALS			11	3	4	18

Last updated: 3 June 2016.
Source: Competitive matches

=== Goals conceded ===
The list is sorted by shirt number when total 'minutes played' are equal.

Rnk	No.	Player	Pro League	Hazfi Cup	ACL	Total	Minutes Played
1	1	(Iran) Mehdi Rahmati	21	3	11	35	92.6 min
2	22	(Iran) Hossein Hosseini	6	0	0	6	120 min
TOTALS			27	3	11	41	96.6 min

Last updated: 3 June 2017.
Source: Competitive matches

== See also ==
- 2016–17 Persian Gulf Pro League
- 2016–17 Hazfi Cup
- 2017 AFC Champions League
