= Mohammad Gholamin =

Iranian footballer

Personal information
- Full name: Mohammad Gholamin Noveirsari
- Date of birth: February 11, 1986 (age 40)
- Place of birth: Bandar-e Anzali, Iran
- Position: Striker

Youth career
- Malavan

Senior career*
Years	Team	Apps	(Gls)
2004–2006	Malavan	50	(13)
2006–2007	Paykan	17	(0)
2007–2008	Steel Azin	10	(2)
2008–2009	Sanat Naft	12	(3)
2009–2010	Payam	14	(6)
2010–2011	Aboomoslem	23	(3)
2011–2012	Gohar Zagros	23	(3)
2012–2013	Iranjavan	7	(1)
2013–2014	Shalamcheh	9	(1)
2014–2015	Malavan	11	(1)

International career
2006	Iran U23	8	(0)
- * Club domestic league appearances and goals as of 10 May 2014

Mohammad Gholamin Noveirsari (Persian: محمد غلامین, born 11 February 1986 in Bandar-e Anzali, Iran) is an Iranian football player.

He was also a member of Iran national under-23 football team.

== Club statistics ==
As of 28 September 2010

Club performance			League	
Season	Club	League	Apps	Goals
Iran			League	
2004–05	Malavan	Pro League	25	5
2005–06	Malavan	Pro League	25	8
2006–07	Paykan	Pro League	17	0
2007–08	Steel Azin	1st Division		0
2008–09	Sanat Naft	1st Division		0
2009–10	Payam	1st Division		6
2010–11	Aboomoslem	1st Division	23	3
2011–12	Gohar Zagros	1st Division	23	3
2012–13	Iranjavan	1st Division	7	1
2012–13	Shalamcheh	1st Division	9	1
2014–15	Malavan	Pro League	0	0
Country	Iran			27
Total				27

- Assist Goals

Season	Team	Assists
05–06	Malavan	1
06–07	Paykan	2
