= 2011–12 Azadegan League =

21st season of Azadegan League

Azadegan League
- Season: 2011–12
- Champions: Paykan; 1st Azadegan League title
- Promoted: Paykan; Aluminium Hormozgan; Gahar Zagros
- Relegated: Sanat Sari; Payam Mokhaberat; Sanati Kaveh; Bargh Shiraz
- Matches: 364
- Goals: 689 (1.89 per match)
- Top goalscorer: Bahman Tahmasebi (13 goals)
- Biggest home win: Iranjavan 4–0 Mes Rafsanjan (10 November 2011)
- Biggest away win: Payam Mokhaberat 1–7 Paykan (3 November 2011)
- Highest scoring: Payam Mokhaberat 1–7 Paykan (3 November 2011)
- Highest attendance: 15,000; Nassaji – Naft MIS (5 April 2012)
- Lowest attendance: 0 (spectator ban); Aluminium Hormozgan – Gol Gohar (15 September 2011); Sanat Sari – Saipa Shomal (15 September 2011); Parseh Tehran – Sh. Arak (14 October 2011); Shirin Faraz – Nassaji (27 December 2011); Naft MIS – Sh. Yasouj (27 January 2012); Aboumoslem – Paykan (16 February 2012); Nassaji – Tarbiat Yazd (8 March 2012); Aluminium Hormozgan – Tarbiat Yazd (6 April 2012); Est. Khuzestan – Nassaji (10 April 2012); Naft MIS – Bargh Shiraz (13 April 2012)
- Total attendance: 831,800
- Average attendance: 2,350

The 2011–12 Azadegan League was the 21st season of the Azadegan League and 11th as the second highest division since its establishment in 1991. The season featured 21 teams from the 2010–11 Azadegan League, three new teams relegated from the 2010–11 Persian Gulf Cup: PAS Hamedan, Paykan and Steel Azin and three new teams promoted from the 2010–11 2nd Division: Saipa Shomal as champions, Niroye Zamini and Parseh Tehran. Esteghlal Khuzestan replaced Esteghlal Jonoub Tehran. Damash Lorestan changed their name into Gahar Zagros while Hamyari Arak changed their name into Shahrdari Arak. The league started on 14 September 2011 and ended on 19 April 2012. Paykan won the Azadegan League title for the first time in their history. Paykan, Aluminium Hormozgan and Gahar Zagros promoted to the Persian Gulf Cup.

== Teams ==
The league featured three clubs relegated from Iran Pro League: Steel Azin and Paykan both returned to the Azadegan League after two seasons in the top division. The third team Pas Hamedan, were relegated for the first time in that club's history to a lower league.

Locations of clubs in 2010–11 Azadegan League

=== Group A ===
Team	City	Venue	Capacity	Head Coach	Note
Aboomoslem	Mashhad	Samen	35,000	(Iran) Khodadad Azizi	
Parseh Tehran	Tehran	Kargaran	5,000	(Iran) Mehdi Dinvarzadeh	Changed name from Damash
Etka	Gorgan	Karim Abad	15,000	(Iran) Hamid Kolalifard	
Foolad Yazd	Yazd	Nassiri	6,000	(North Macedonia) Zoran Smilevski	
Iranjavan	Bushehr	Shahid Beheshti	15,000	(Iran) Abdolrahim Kharazmi	
Gostaresh Foolad	Tabriz	Bagh Shomal	20,000	(Iran) Mohammad H Ziaei	
Mes Rafsanjan	Rafsanjan	Noushabad	10,000	(Iran) Akbar Zabardast	
Payam Mokhaberat	Shiraz	Hafezieh	20,000	(Iran) Asghar Akbari	
Paykan	Tehran	Iran Khodro	5,000	(Iran) Farhad Kazemi	
Saipa Shomal	Qa'em-Shahr	Vatani	15,000	(Armenia) Samvel Darbinyan	
Sanat Sari	Sari	Shohada Stadium	15,000	(Iran) Nader Dastneshan	
Shahrdari Arak	Arak	Imam Khomeini	15,000	(Iran) Hamid Kolalifard	Replaced for Hamyari Arak
Shahrdari Bandar Abbas	Bandar Abbas	Takhti	10,000	(Portugal) Acácio Casimiro	
Steel Azin	Semnan	Takhti	10,000	(Iran) Faraz Kamalvand	

=== Group B ===
Team	City	Venue	Capacity	Head Coach	Note
Aluminium Hormozgan	Bandar Abbas	Takhti	10,000	(Iran) Akbar Misaghian	
Bargh Shiraz	Shiraz	Hafezieh	20,000	(Iran) Mehrdad Shekari	
Esteghlal Khuzestan	Ahvaz	Takhti Ahvaz	30,000	(Iran) Majid Bagherinia	Replaced for Esteghlal Jonub
Gahar Zagros	Dorood	Takhti	10,000	(Iran) Davoud Mahabadi	
Gol Gohar	Sirjan	Imam Ali	2,000	(Iran) Mehdi Mohammadi	
Machine Sazi	Tabriz	Bagh Shomal	20,000	(Iran) Rasoul Khatibi	
Naft Masjed Soleyman	Masjed Soleyman	Takhti Ahvaz	30,000	(Iran) Siavash Bakhtiarizade	
Nassaji	Qa'em-Shahr	Vatani	15,000	(Iran) Davoud Mahabadi	
Nirooye Zamini	Tehran	Jey Stadium		(Iran) Ali Rouzbahani	
PAS Hamedan	Hamedan	Shahid Mofatteh	10,000	(Croatia) Vinko Begović	
Sanati Kaveh	Tehran	Aliaf Stadium	5,000	(Iran) Majid Namjoo-Motlagh	
Shahrdari Yasuj	Yasuj	Takhti Yasuj	5,000	(Iran) Abdollah Chamanian	
Shirin Faraz	Kermanshah	Azadi Stadium	7,000	(Iran) Majid Aghajari	
Tarbiat Yazd	Yazd	Nassiri	6,000	(Iran) Hadi Bargizar	

== Managerial changes ==
Team	Outgoing manager	Manner of departure	Date of vacancy	Position in table	Replaced by	Date of appointment
Aboomoslem	(Iran) Ali Hanteh	Resigned	2011		(Iran) Kazem Ghiasian	2011
Sanati Kaveh	(Iran) Saket Elhami	Resigned	20 October 2011	14	(Iran) Ahmad Sanjari	29 October 2011
Aboomoslem	(Iran) Kazem Ghiasian	Sacked	19 November 2011	8	(Iran) Khodadad Azizi	19 November 2011
Sanati Kaveh	(Iran) Ahmad Sanjari	Resigned	November 2011	14	(Iran) Morteza Yekeh	Nov 2011
Sanati Kaveh	(Iran) Morteza Yekeh		17 November 2011	14	(Iran) Mehdi Dinvarzadeh	Nov 2011
Sanati Kaveh	(Iran) Mehdi Dinvarzadeh	Resigned	1 December 2011	14	(Iran) Ali Nazarzadeh	1 December 2012
Sanati Kaveh	(Iran) Ali Nazarzadeh	End of caretaker spell	2 December 2011	14	(Iran) Majid Namjoo-Motlagh	3 December 2011
Pas Hamedan	(Iran) Faraz Kamalvand	Resigned	12 January 2012	5	(Iran) Jalal Cheraghpour	12 January 2012
Parseh	(Iran) Hossein Peyrovani	Resigned	19 January 2012		(Iran) Edmond Yunanpour	25 January 2012
Pas Hamedan	(Iran) Jalal Cheraghpour	End of caretaker spell	22 January 2012		(Croatia) Vinko Begović	22 January 2012
Gostaresh	(Iran) Hossein Ziaei	Sacked	31 January 2012	12	(Iran) Hadi Bargizar	31 January 2012
Parseh	(Iran) Edmond Yunanpour		Feb 2012		(Iran) Mehdi Dinvarzadeh	5 February 2012
Steel Azin	(Iran) Human Afazeli	Resigned	18 February 2012	11	(Iran) Faraz Kamalvand	18 February 2012
Sanat Sari	(Iran) Reza Taghavi	Sacked	18 February 2012	14	(Iran) Farshad Pious	19 February 2012
Shahrdari Arak	(Iran) Nader Dastneshan	Sacked	27 February 2012	7	(Iran) Ali Hanteh	27 February 2012

== Standings ==
=== Group A ===
Pos	Team	Pld	W	D	L	GF	GA	GD	Pts	Promotion or relegation
1	Paykan (P)	26	14	8	4	44	26	+18	50	Promotion to 2012–13 Persian Gulf Cup
2	Iranjavan (Q)	26	13	9	4	31	16	+15	48	Azadegan League 2011–12 Play Off
3	Sh. Bandar Abbas	26	10	8	8	26	27	−1	38	
4	Sh. Arak	26	9	10	7	19	17	+2	37	
5	Foolad Yazd	26	9	9	8	25	23	+2	36	
6	Aboumoslem	26	8	10	8	21	18	+3	34	
7	Etka Gorgan	26	9	7	10	21	20	+1	34	
8	Saipa Shomal	26	8	9	9	26	26	0	33	
9	Gostaresh	26	7	11	8	25	30	−5	32	
10	Steel Azin	26	10	10	6	29	22	+7	28 (Note: Steel Azin was docked 12 points by FIFA.)	
11	Parseh Tehran	26	8	4	14	20	29	−9	28	
12	Mes Rafsanjan	26	6	8	12	22	28	−6	26	
13	Sanat Sari (R)	26	7	5	14	20	34	−14	26	Relegation to 2012–13 Iran Football's 2nd Division
14	Payam Mokhaberat (R)	26	5	10	11	15	28	−13	25	Relegation to 2012–13 Iran Football's 2nd Division

Updated to match(es) played on 7 May 2012. Source: Foolad FC
Rules for classification: 1) points; 2) goal difference; 3) number of goals scored.
(P) Promoted; (Q) Qualified for the phase indicated; (R) Relegated

=== Group B ===
Pos	Team	Pld	W	D	L	GF	GA	GD	Pts	Promotion or relegation
1	Aluminium Hormozgan (P)	26	15	7	4	28	12	+16	52	Promotion to 2012–13 Persian Gulf Cup
2	Gahar Zagros (P, Q)	26	11	9	6	23	16	+7	42	Azadegan League 2011–12 Play Off
3	Machine Sazi	26	11	8	7	32	25	+7	41	
4	PAS Hamedan	26	10	9	7	29	25	+4	39	
5	Nassaji Mazandaran	26	10	7	9	26	26	0	37	
6	Est. Khuzestan	26	9	8	9	28	23	+5	35	
7	Sh. Yasouj	26	10	5	11	24	27	−3	35	
8	Naft Masjed Soleyman	26	8	10	8	25	26	−1	34	
9	Gol Gohar	26	9	6	11	28	28	0	33	
10	Niroye Zamini	26	7	11	8	23	24	−1	32	
11	Shirin Faraz	26	7	11	8	22	27	−5	32	
12	Tarbiat Yazd	26	7	9	10	21	26	−5	30	
13	Sanati Kaveh (R)	26	7	8	11	24	23	+1	29	Relegation to 2012–13 Iran Football's 2nd Division
14	Bargh Shiraz (R)	26	4	6	16	12	37	−25	18	Relegation to 2012–13 Iran Football's 2nd Division

Updated to match(es) played on 7 May 2012. Source: Foolad FC
Rules for classification: 1) points; 2) goal difference; 3) number of goals scored.
(P) Promoted; (Q) Qualified for the phase indicated; (R) Relegated

== Results table ==
=== Group A ===
Home \ Away	ABU	PAT	ETK	FOY	GOS	IRJ	MSR	PMS	PAY	SAI	SAN	SHA	SHB	STL
Aboumoslem		1–0	0–2	1–0	3–1	0–0	1–0	0–0	1–2	0–1	3–0	0–0	0–1	2–2
Parseh Tehran	0–0		0–0	3–0	2–1	0–0	1–0	0–0	1–2	2–1	1–4	0–1	1–2	1–2
Etka Gorgan	0–0	3–0		0–1	0–0	0–1	0–1	0–2	1–0	1–0	2–1	2–1	2–0	1–2
Foolad Yazd	2–1	2–1	2–0		0–0	2–2	1–0	2–1	1–1	0–0	2–0	0–0	1–0	0–0
Gostaresh	1–1	1–0	1–1	1–4		0–0	1–2	1–1	2–1	0–0	1–0	1–0	0–1	2–0
Iranjavan	1–0	0–2	2–1	2–1	2–0		4–0	3–1	1–0	2–0	1–0	0–0	2–0	0–2
Mes Rafsanjan	1–1	2–0	0–0	2–0	0–0	1–2		0–0	1–2	4–1	1–0	1–2	0–0	1–2
Payam Mokhaberat	0–1	1–2	2–1	1–1	1–1	0–0	0–0		1–7	0–0	1–0	0–1	0–0	1–0
Paykan	1–0	1–0	1–1	1–1	1–1	0–0	3–2	1–0		2–1	4–2	0–0	4–1	2–1
Saipa Shomal	0–1	2–0	1–0	2–1	0–1	1–1	1–1	2–0	2–1		2–2	2–1	1–1	1–2
Sanat Sari	1–1	1–0	1–2	1–0	1–2	1–3	2–1	1–0	0–1	0–3		1–0	0–0	1–0
Sh. Arak	1–0	2–1	0–1	1–0	1–1	2–1	1–0	0–1	2–2	1–1	0–0		0–1	0–0
Sh. Bandar Abbas	1–1	0–1	0–0	2–1	4–3	2–1	3–1	1–0	2–3	2–1	0–0	0–1		1–1
Steel Azin	0–2	0–1	1–0	0–0	4–2	0–0	0–0	3–1	1–1	0–0	3–0	1–1	2–1	

Updated to match(es) played on 18 April 2012. Source:
Legend: Blue = home team win; Yellow = draw; Red = away team win.

=== Group B ===
Home \ Away	ALH	BGH	ESK	GZA	GOL	MST	NFT	NSJ	NRO	PAS	KAV	SHY	SFZ	TAR
Aluminium Hormozgan		2–0	1–1	1–0	1–1	0–0				2–0	1–0	2–0	0–0	
Bargh Shiraz				0–1			0–0	2–1	1–1	0–0	0–3	1–2	1–0	0–1
Est. Khuzestan		1–1					2–0		1–1	0–0	1–0	0–2	3–1	1–1
Gahar Zagros	0–1	1–0	1–0			3–1	1–1	0–0			1–1		3–1	3–1
Gol Gohar	1–2	3–0	3–1	0–0		2–2	3–0				3–2	0–1		2–1
Machine Sazi		1–1	2–1	2–1	2–0		2–2				3–2	3–1	1–1	1–2
Naft Masjed Soleyman	1–1					1–0		2–3	1–1	1–2		1–0	1–1	1–0
Nassaji Mazandaran	0–1		1–0	1–0	1–0	1–3			0–0	2–1	1–1	1–0		
Niroye Zamini	1–0	1–1	1–0	0–1	1–0	1–1		1–0			1–0	2–2		
PAS Hamedan	1–1	2–1	1–2	1–2	2–1	0–1		2–1	2–1					1–1
Sanati Kaveh	1–2	0–1	0–0				0–1	2–1	1–1	1–1			2–0	1–1
Sh. Yasouj			2–0	0–0	1–2	0–1	1–0		1–3	2–0	1–0		2–2	
Shirin Faraz	1–1	1–0			0–0	1–0	1–1	2–0	2–1	1–1				1–0
Tarbiat Yazd	0–2			2–0	2–0		2–1	1–1	0–0	1–3		0–0	2–1	

Updated to match(es) played on 9 February 2012. Source:
Legend: Blue = home team win; Yellow = draw; Red = away team win.

== Play Off ==
First leg played on 1 May 2012; return leg to be played on 8 May 2012

Team 1	Agg.	Team 2	1st leg	2nd leg
Iranjavan	1–1	Gahar Zagros	1-1	0-0

Winner is promoted to the Persian Gulf Cup

== Final ==
The Final scheduled to play on 2 May 2012

Team 1	Score	Team 2	Notes
Paykan	(w/o)	Aluminum Hormozgan	

== Player statistics ==
=== Top scorers, Group A ===
Rank	Scorer	Club	Goals
1	(Iran) Hamid Kazemi	Steel Azin	9
	(Iran) Hossein Khosravi	Iranjavan	9
2	(Iran) Saber Mirghorbani	Shahrdari Arak	8
3	(Iran) Amir Khalifeasl	Shahrdari Bandar Abbas	7

=== Top scorers, Group B ===
Rank	Player	Club	Goals
1	(Iran) Bahman Tahmasebi	Aluminum H	13
2	(Iran) Rasoul Alizadeh	Mashin Sazi	8
	(Cameroon) Ambuno Achille	Shirin Faraz	8
3	(Iran) Meghdad Ghobakhlou	Shahrdari Yasuj	7
	(Iran) Mousa Shahbazi	Niroye Zamini	7

== Attendance ==
=== Average home attendance ===
Pos	Team	Total	High	Low	Average	Change
1	Naft MIS	100,000	10,000	0	9,091	+1.0%
2	Gahar Zagros	80,000	10,000	2,000	6,154	+79.7%
3	Nassaji	69,500	15,000	0	5,792	−54.6%
4	Aluminium Hormozgan	55,600	10,000	0	5,055	+66.4%
5	Sh. Yasouj	52,500	7,000	2,000	4,038	−27.1%
6	Sh. Arak	47,000	7,000	1,000	3,615	+151.4%
7	Machine Sazi	42,500	5,000	1,000	3,269	+312.8%
8	Sh. Bandar Abbas	41,200	7,000	200	3,169	+75.3%
9	Steel Azin	36,000	4,000	1,000	2,769	−29.7%
10	Mes Rafsanjan	30,500	3,000	500	2,346	−9.0%
11	Gol Gohar	27,500	3,000	1,500	2,115	−6.8%
12	Iranjavan	27,000	5,000	1,000	2,077	+7.0%
13	PAS Hamedan	25,500	3,000	1,000	1,962	−56.7%
14	Saipa Shomal	24,300	3,500	100	1,869	n/a
15	Shirin Faraz	22,500	3,000	0	1,875	−28.3%
16	Foolad Yazd	23,400	4,000	100	1,800	−33.1%
17	Sanat Sari	16,200	3,000	0	1,350	−67.5%
18	Etka Gorgan	17,000	2,300	100	1,308	+0.3%
19	Est. Khuzestan	15,500	2,000	0	1,292	n/a
20	Aboumoslem	11,150	2,500	0	929	−31.2%
21	Tarbiat Yazd	11,700	2,000	200	900	−78.8%
22	Paykan	11,650	3,000	100	896	−53.8%
23	Bargh Shiraz	11,000	2,000	100	846	−26.7%
24	Gostaresh	10,950	2,000	50	842	−83.1%
25	Niroye Zamini	7,800	3,000	100	600	n/a
25	Payam Mokhaberat	7,800	1,500	100	600	+29.9%
27	Parseh Tehran	3,450	1,000	0	288	n/a
28	Sanati Kaveh	2,600	1,000	100	200	+6.4%
	League total	831,800	15,000	0	2,350	−14.0%

Updated to games played on 19 April 2012
Source: iplstats.com
Notes:
Matches with spectator bans are not included in average attendances
PAS Hamedan, Paykan and Steel Azin played last season in Persian Gulf Cup
Niroye Zamini, Parseh Tehran and Saipa Shomal played last season in Iran 2nd Division
Esteghlal Khuzestan replaced Esteghlal Jonoub Tehran
Damash Lorestan changed their name into Gahar Zagros
Hamyari Arak changed their name into Shahrdari Arak

=== Highest attendance ===
Rank	Home team	Score	Away team	Attendance	Date	Week	Stadium
1	Nassaji	0–0	Naft MIS	15,000	5 April 2012	24	Vatani
2	Naft MIS	1–2	PAS Hamadan	10,000	17 November 2011	7	Behnam Mohammadi
2	Naft MIS	2–3	Nassaji	10,000	16 December 2011	11	Behnam Mohammadi
2	Naft MIS	1–1	Aluminium Hormozgan	10,000	27 December 2011	13	Behnam Mohammadi
2	Naft MIS	1–0	Tarbiat Yazd	10,000	12 January 2012	14	Behnam Mohammadi
2	Gahar Zagros	0–1	Aluminium Hormozgan	10,000	27 January 2012	16	Takhti Doroud
2	Naft MIS	0–0	Gol Gohar	10,000	3 February 2012	17	Behnam Mohammadi
2	Naft MIS	1–0	Gahar Zagros	10,000	16 February 2012	19	Behnam Mohammadi
2	Aluminium Hormozgan	1–0	Niroye Zamini	10,000	16 February 2012	19	Khalij-e Fars
2	Naft MIS	2–1	Sanati Kaveh	10,000	29 February 2012	21	Behnam Mohammadi

Notes:
Updated to games played on 19 April 2012. Source: iplstats.com

== See also ==
- 2011–12 Persian Gulf Cup
- 2011–12 Iran Football's 2nd Division
- 2011–12 Iran Football's 3rd Division
- 2011–12 Hazfi Cup
- Iranian Super Cup
- 2011–12 Iranian Futsal Super League
