= 2012–13 Azadegan League =

22nd season of Azadegan League

Azadegan League
- Season: 2012–13
- Champions: Gostaresh Foulad 1st Azadegan League title; Esteghlal Khuzestan 1st Azadegan League title
- Promoted: Gostaresh Foulad; Esteghlal Khuzestan
- Relegated: Etka Gorgan; Shahin Bushehr; Shahrdari Arak; Machine Sazi; Shahrdari Tabriz; Hafari Ahvaz; Bargh Shiraz; Yadavaran Shalamcheh
- Matches: 364
- Goals: 770 (2.12 per match)
- Top goalscorer: Mohammad Abbaszadeh (18 goals)
- Biggest home win: Nassaji 5–0 Sh. Arak (16 February 2013)
- Biggest away win: Yadavaran Shalamcheh 0–3 PAS Hamedan (15 November 2012); Parseh 2–5 Sang Ahan (28 December 2012)
- Highest scoring: Hafari Ahvaz 4–4 Bargh Shiraz (9 December 2012); Aboumoslem 4–4 Mes Sarcheshmeh (31 January 2013)

The 2012–13 Azadegan League was the 22nd season of the Azadegan League and 12th as the second highest division since its establishment in 1991. The season featured 19 teams from the 2011–12 Azadegan League, three new teams relegated from the 2011–12 Persian Gulf Cup (Shahin Bushehr, Shahrdari Tabriz and Mes Sarcheshmeh) and four new teams promoted from the 2011–12 2nd Division (Esteghlal Ahvaz as champions, Gostaresh Foulad and Hafari Ahvaz). Alvand Hamedan replaced PAS Novin Hamedan, Bargh Shiraz replaced Steel Azin and Sang Ahan replaced Tarbiat Yazd. The league started on 13 September 2012 and ended on 16 April 2013. Gostaresh Foulad and Esteghlal Khuzestan won the Azadegan League title for the first time in their history. Gostaresh Foulad and Esteghlal Khuzestan were promoted to the Persian Gulf Cup.

== Changes ==
Locations of clubs in 2012–13 Azadegan League
- At the end of 2011–12 Azadegan League season, Sanat Sari, Payam Mokhaberat, Kaveh, Bargh Shiraz were relegated to 2012–13 Iran Football's 2nd Division.
- The four relegated teams were replaced by four 2011–12 Iran Football's 2nd Division winners. Esteghlal Ahvaz made an immediate return to Azadegan League. Hafari Ahvaz also promoted to Azadegan League. The two other promoted teams, Pas Novin and Gostaresh Foolad Sahand, were reserve teams of PAS Hamedan, and Gostaresh Foolad.
- Kaveh Tehran bought Gostaresh Foolad Sahand and returned to the Azadegan League.
- Pas Novin have changed their name and sponsorship to Alvand Hamedan, so they can remain in Azadegan League.
- Steel Azin come back from Semnan to Tehran.
- Sang Ahan Company bought Tarbiat Yazd and changed the name to Sang Ahan Bafq.
- Bargh Shiraz bought Steel Azin and return to Azadegan League.
- Yadavaran Shalamcheh bought Kaveh Tehran and came to the Azadegan League.

== Match fixing scandal ==
After Shahrdari Tabriz promoted to the Iran Pro League, the former chairman of Niroye Zamini was announced that he was offered 100,000,000 tomans to fixing the match between two teams, a bid that he rejected. Two days later, one of the players of the Shahrdari Bandar Abbas was charged that he was purchased to score an own goal in match with Shahrdari Tabriz. IRIFF opened a case for the match-fixing scandal and excluded coaching staff and management of Shahrdari Tabriz temporarily. The play-off and championship matches was also postponed to another time until the final judgment. The final was announced on 13 May 2013. Shahrdari Tabriz's promotion was canceled and they will not be playing at Azadegan League next season too, Faraz Kamalvand (head coach of Shahrdari Tabriz) and his assistants were banned for two years from football careers. The team manager of Shahrdari Tabriz and chairman of the club were also banned for one year and six months. Yadavaran Shalamcheh (which relegated to the 2nd Division) was relegated to the 3rd Division. Nader Dastneshan (head coach of Saipa Shomal), Majid Bagherinia (head coach of Esteghlal Khuzestan) and chairman of the club.

== Teams ==
Team	City	Venue	Capacity	Head coach	Note
Aboomoslem	Mashhad	Samen Stadium	35,000	(Iran) Hadi Bargizar	
Alvand Hamedan	Hamedan	Qods Stadium	10,000	(Iran) Reza Talaeimanesh	
Bargh Shiraz	Shiraz	Dastgheib	5,000	(Iran) Mohammad Abbassi	
Esteghlal Ahvaz	Ahvaz	Takhti Ahvaz	30,000	(Iran) Adel Hardani	
Esteghlal Khuzestan	Ahvaz	Takhti Ahvaz	30,000	(Iran) Majid Bagherinia	
Etka	Gorgan	Karim Abad	15,000	(Iran) Saket Elhami	
Foolad Yazd	Yazd	Nassiri	6,000	(Iran) Ali Kalantari	
Gol Gohar	Sirjan	Imam Ali	2,000	(Iran) Ghasem Shahba	
Gostaresh Foolad	Tabriz	Bagh Shomal	20,000	(Iran) Rasoul Khatibi	
Hafari Ahvaz	Ahvaz	Takhti Ahvaz	30,000	(Iran) Nasser Motlagh	
Iranjavan	Bushehr	Shahid Beheshti	15,000	(Iran) Ahmad Sanjari	
Machine Sazi	Tabriz	Bagh Shomal	20,000	(Iran) Asghar E'tebari	
Mes Rafsanjan	Rafsanjan	Shohadaye Noushabad	10,000	(Iran) Bahman Foroutan	
Mes Sarcheshmeh	Sarcheshmeh	Shahid Bahonar	12,000	(Iran) Davoud Mahabadi	
Naft Masjed Soleyman	Masjed Soleyman	Takhti Ahvaz	30,000	(North Macedonia) Zoran Smilevski	
Nassaji	Qa'em Shahr	Vatani	15,000	(Iran) Esmaeil Esmaeili	
Niroye Zamini	Tehran	Takhti Tehran	30,000	(Iran) Bahman Khoda Karam	
PAS Hamedan	Hamedan	Qods Stadium	80,000	(Iran) Omid Tayyeri	
Parseh Tehran	Tehran	Kargaran Stadium	5,000	(Iran) Alireza Emamifar	
Saipa Shomal	Qa'em Shahr	Shahid Vatani	10,000	(Iran) Nader Dastneshan	
Sang Ahan Bafq	Bafq	Shohada	6,000	(Iran) Afshin Peyrovani	
Shahin Bushehr	Bushehr	Shahid Beheshti	14,000	(Iran) Ali Hanteh	
Shahrdari Arak	Arak	Imam Khomeini	15,000	(Iran) Mohammad Navazi	
Shahrdari Bandar Abbas	Bandar Abbas	Takhti	10,000	(Iran) Abdolrahim Khorramzi	
Shahrdari Tabriz	Tabriz	Yadegar Emam Tabriz	50,000	(Iran) Faraz Kamalvand	
Shahrdari Yasuj	Yasuj	Takhti	5,000	(Iran) Abbas Chamanyan	
Rahian Kermanshah	Kermanshah	Azadi	7,000	(Iran) Javad Zarincheh	
Yadavaran Shalamcheh	Khorramshahr	Jahan Ara	2,000	(Iran) Human Afazeli	

== Managerial changes ==
Team	Outgoing manager	Manner of departure	Date of vacancy	Replaced by	Date of appointment
Machine Sazi	(Iran) Alireza Akbarpour		November 2012	(Iran) Asghar Etebari	November 2012
Pas Hamedan	(Croatia) Vingo Begovic		January 2013	(Iran) Omid Teyri	January 2013

== Standings ==
=== Group A ===
Pos	Team	Pld	W	D	L	GF	GA	GD	Pts	Promotion or relegation
1	Gostaresh (P)	26	14	8	4	44	25	+19	50	Promotion to 2013–14 Iran Pro League
2	Mes Sarcheshmeh (Q)	26	12	11	3	29	15	+14	47	Azadegan League 2012–13 play-off
3	Naft Masjed Soleyman	26	13	6	7	41	31	+10	45	
4	Alvand Hamedan	26	12	7	7	33	23	+10	43	
5	Gol Gohar	26	11	8	7	29	25	+4	41	
6	Aboumoslem	26	10	8	8	39	34	+5	38	
7	Sang Ahan Bafgh	26	9	7	10	37	32	+5	34	
8	Nassaji Mazandaran	26	9	9	8	33	27	+6	33 (Note: Nassaji Mazandaran was docked 3 points.)	
9	Parseh Tehran	26	6	13	7	30	30	0	31	
10	Est. Ahvaz	26	7	9	10	25	34	−9	30	
11	Etka Gorgan (R)	26	7	9	10	15	24	−9	30	Relegation to 2013–14 Iran Football's 2nd Division
12	Shahin Bushehr (R)	26	6	8	12	18	30	−12	26	Relegation to 2013–14 Iran Football's 2nd Division
13	Sh. Arak (R)	26	6	7	13	16	30	−14	25	Relegation to 2013–14 Iran Football's 2nd Division
14	Machine Sazi (R)	26	3	4	19	18	47	−29	13	Relegation to 2013–14 Iran Football's 2nd Division

Updated to match(es) played on 15 April 2013. Source: Varzesh3.com
Rules for classification: 1) points; 2) goal difference; 3) number of goals scored.
(P) Promoted; (Q) Qualified for the phase indicated; (R) Relegated

=== Group B ===
Pos	Team	Pld	W	D	L	GF	GA	GD	Pts	Promotion or relegation
1	Sh. Tabriz (R)	26	13	8	5	33	20	+13	47	Relegation to 2nd Division (Note: Shahrdari Tabriz was relegated to the 2nd Division due to match-fixing scandal.)
2	Est. Khuzestan (P)	26	13	7	6	24	18	+6	46	Promotion to 2013–14 Iran Pro League
3	PAS Hamedan (Q)	26	14	3	9	25	18	+7	45	Azadegan League 2012–13 play-off
4	Sh. Yasouj	26	12	6	8	31	20	+11	42	
5	Rahian Kermanshah	26	10	11	5	27	19	+8	41	
6	Niroye Zamini	26	12	4	10	29	27	+2	40	
7	Iranjavan	26	8	13	5	27	20	+7	37	
8	Sh. Bandar Abbas	26	9	10	7	29	25	+4	37	
9	Saipa Shomal	26	11	4	11	22	28	−6	37	
10	Foolad Yazd	26	8	7	11	28	26	+2	31	
11	Mes Rafsanjan	26	7	9	10	14	21	−7	30	
12	Hafari Ahvaz (R)	26	6	8	12	40	42	−2	26	Relegation to 2nd Division
13	Bargh Shiraz (R)	26	4	7	15	22	44	−22	19	Relegation to 2nd Division
14	Yadavaran Shalamcheh (R)	26	3	7	16	12	35	−23	16	Relegation to 3rd Division (Note: Yadavaran Shalamcheh was relegated to the 3rd Division due to match-fixing scandal.)

Updated to match(es) played on 16 April 2013. Source: Varzesh3.com
Rules for classification: 1) points; 2) goal difference; 3) number of goals scored.
(P) Promoted; (Q) Qualified for the phase indicated; (R) Relegated

== Play-off ==
First leg was played on 28 May 2013; return leg on 30 May 2013

Team 1	Agg.	Team 2	1st leg	2nd leg
Pas Hamedan	3–2	Mes Sarcheshmeh	2–1	1–1

Pas Hamedan advanced to the Iran Pro League play-off against Zob Ahan.

== Final ==
The match was played on 31 May 2013

Team 1	Score	Team 2	Notes
Gostaresh	Cancelled	Esteghlal Khuzestan	

== Iran Pro League Playoff ==
The promotion/relegation playoff for 2013–14 Iran Pro League was held between Zob Ahan and Pas Hamedan.

The matches were played on 21 June 2013 and 26 June 2013

Team 1	Agg.	Team 2	1st leg	2nd leg
Zob Ahan	5–3	Pas Hamedan	4–2	1–1

Zob Ahan remained in Iran Pro League.

== Top scorers ==
=== Group A ===
Rank	Scorer	Club	Goals
1	(Iran) Mohammad Abbaszadeh	Nassaji	18
2	(Iran) Younes Shakeri	Aboomoslem	11
3	(Iran) Hossein Maleki	Naft Masjed Soleyman	8
3	(Iran) Farzad Mohammadi	Naft Masjed Soleyman	8
4	(Iran) Fakhrodin Shahroei	Mes Rafsanjan, Esteghlal Ahvaz	7
4	(Iran) Mokhtar Jomehzadeh	Gol Gohar	7
4	(Iran) Mostafa Chatrabgoon	Mashin Sazi	7

=== Group B ===
Rank	Player	Club	Goals
1	(Iran) Meghdad Ghobakhlou	Pas Hamedan	9
1	(Iran) Hassan Faraji-Moghadam	Bargh Shiraz	9
3	(Iran) Mehdi Chahkotahzadeh	Iranjavan	8
3	(Iran) Ahmad Davoodi	Hafari Ahvaz	8
5	(Cameroon) Ambuno Achille	Rahian Kermanshah	7
6	(Iran) Ali Yoonesi	Shahrdari Tabriz	6
