= Mahabadi =

Mahabadi (Persian: مهابادی; related either to Mahabad or Mahabad county in West Azerbaijan province, Iran, or to a variety of homonymous small settlements across the Islamic Republic of Iran) is a Persian language surname which is also to be found among the Iranian diaspora. Notable people with the surname include:

- Davoud Mahabadi (born 1973), Iranian football manager and former player
- Mohsen Fakhrizadeh-Mahabadi (1958–2020), Iranian physicist
