= Ebrahim Mirzapour =

Iranian footballer

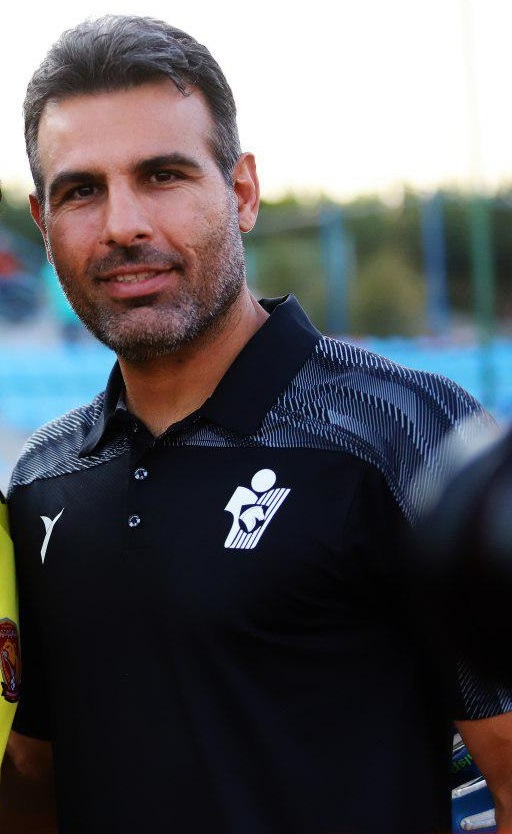
- Mirzapour in 2019

Personal information
- Full name: Ebrahim Mirzapour
- Date of birth: September 16, 1978 (age 48)
- Place of birth: Mamulan, Iran
- Height: 1.92 m (6 ft 4 in)
- Position: Goalkeeper

Team information
- Current team: Paykan (goalkeeping coach)

Youth career
- 1986–1997: Behzisti Mamoolan

Senior career*
Years	Team	Apps	(Gls)
1997–1998	Fajr Khorramabad		
1998–2006	Foolad	168	(1)
2006–2007	Esteghlal Ahvaz	4	(0)
2007–2008	Steel Azin	5	(0)
2008–2010	Saipa	38	(0)
2010–2011	Paykan	27	(0)
2011–2012	Shahrdari Tabriz	25	(0)
2012	Sang Ahan	16	(0)
Total		305	(1)

International career
2001–2011	Iran	70	(0)
2002-2009	Iran U–23 (Wild Card)	6	(0)
Medal record
Representing Iran
Asian Games
Gold medal – first place	2002 Busan	Team competition
- * Club domestic league appearances and goals

Ebrahim Mirzapour (Persian: ابراهیم میرزاپور; born 1978) is a retired Iranian football goalkeeper, who played most of his career for Foolad F.C .

== Club career ==
=== Foolad ===
He started his professional IPL career, playing for Foolad, and was a member of the team until August 2006. He also made it to the national team while playing for Foolad, immediately becoming the number one keeper for his country. One of his most memorable moments came when he scored a goal on rival goalkeeper Armenak Petrosyan, off a goal kick. He was the captain of the team which won the 2004–2005 IPL championship. He also played in AFC Champions League for Foolad. After World Cup 2006, despite rumors linking him to CD Nacional and Saipa, he signed a one-year contract with Foolad's rival, Esteghlal Ahvaz.

=== Esteghlal Ahvaz & Steel Azin ===
He was seriously injured after only four appearances for Esteghlal Ahvaz, an injury that kept him out of play for fourteen months. He made his first appearance for his new club Steel Azin in a Hazfi Cup match against Shirin Faraz in November 2007.

=== Saipa ===
Then, for the 2008–09 season he joined Saipa. He started the season with being a regular player but he could not keep this and only played in 16 matches. He mentioned that he wants to stay with Saipa. He second season was more successful where he was able to play more matches and was even called up to Team Melli.

=== Retirement ===
He joined Paykan in the summer of 2010 but after the club's relegation to the Azadegan League, he left the club and joined Shahrdari Tabriz for the next season but had a serious injury towards the end of the season and did not finish the season. He joined the first division team Sang Ahan for the next season and played 16 matches. Mirzapour retired from professional football in 2013.

== International career ==
Ebrahim Mirzapour's introduction to the Iranian football squad certainly raised a few eyebrows in Iran when the ex-national team coach, the Croat Miroslav Blazevic preferred him to some more experienced goal keepers. Although Mirzapour started nervously, his solid performance in friendly games and against the odds made Blazevic to have enough confidence in him and install him as the fixed starter in the World Cup 2002 qualification matches. Mirzapour did not disappoint either as his towering presence and agility against the best of the competition certainly increased his popularity and his fan base. Although he was faulted in one or two occasions during the qualifying rounds, he was also credited for many saves and for preventing defeats in matches, by his solid and strong performance. Iran eventually did not make it to the 2002 World Cup, due to their 2–1 aggregate loss to the Republic of Ireland in the playoffs.

Ebrahim Mirzapour was able to keep his starting position in the national team coached by Branko Ivankovic. He was the starting goalkeeper in Iran's successful run of victories, attaining a number of clean sheets throughout the 2006 World Cup qualifying matches. Iran together with Japan were the first nations to qualify for the 2006 World Cup, where Mirzapour played in all three of Iran's matches.

Although his outstanding reflexes and agility are noted, Mirzapour has a habit of suffering from lapses in concentration and is prone to make mistakes especially on goal kicks. He played a great game in Iran's second World Cup match vs. Portugal, although they lost 2–0.

=== Post World Cup ===
After the world cup and the criticism on him, he was invited to Team Melli again for the match against South Korea in 2007 AFC Asian Cup qualification match under the new coach Amir Ghalenoei. After about two years he was invited to Team Melli again in May 2008 under Ali Daei and played for Team Melli in West Asian Football Federation Championship 2008 after about 2 years and won this cup but he got injured in the match against Qatar. He featured in West Asian Football Federation Championship 2010 and was part of the squad in 2011 Asian Cup under Afshin Ghotbi.

== Career statistics ==
As of 10 May 2013

Club performance			League		Cup		Continental		Total	
Season	Club	League	Apps	Goals	Apps	Goals	Apps	Goals	Apps	Goals
Iran			League		Hazfi Cup		Asia		Total	
1998–99	Foolad	Azadegan League	19	0	0	0	–	–	19	0
1999–00	Foolad	Azadegan League	20	0	0	0	–	–	20	0
2000–01	Foolad	Azadegan League	22	0	0	0	–	–	22	0
2001–02	Foolad	Pro League	23	0	0	0	–	–	23	0
2002–03	Foolad	Pro League	23	0	1	0	–	–	24	0
2003–04	Foolad	Pro League	21	1	2	0	–	–	23	1
2004–05	Foolad	Pro League	22	0	1	0	–	–	23	0
2005–06	Foolad	Pro League	18	0	2	0	5	0	25	0
2006–07	Esteghlal Ahvaz	Pro League	4	0	0	0	–	–	4	0
2007–08	Steel Azin	Division 1	5	0	0	0	–	–	5	0
2008–09	Saipa	Pro League	16	0	0	0	0	0	16	0
2009–10	Saipa	Pro League	22	0	0	0	–	–	22	0
2010–11	Paykan	Pro League	27	0	0	0	–	–	27	0
2011–12	Shahrdari Tabriz	Pro League	25	0	1	0	–	–	26	0
2012–13	Sang Ahan	Division 1	16	0	0	0	–	–	16	0
Career total			283	1	7	0	5	0	295	1

== Honours ==
Foolad

- Iran Pro League (1): 2004–05

Iran

- Asian Games (1): 2002
- AFC/OFC Cup Challenge (1): 2003
- West Asian Football Federation Championship (1): 2008
