= Róbson (footballer, born 1994) =

Brazilian footballer

Robson
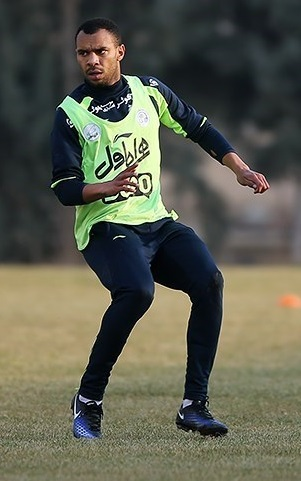

Personal information
- Full name: Róbson Januário de Paula
- Date of birth: February 14, 1994 (age 32)
- Place of birth: Itaguaçu, Brazil
- Height: 1.86 m (6 ft 1 in)
- Position: Centre back

Youth career
- 2009–2014: Bahia

Senior career*
Years	Team	Apps	(Gls)
2013–2017	Bahia	27	(0)
2013	→ Kawasaki Frontale (loan)	0	(0)
2016–2017	→ Esteghlal (loan)	24	(0)
2017–2019	Boavista	13	(0)
2018–2019	→ Baniyas (loan)	23	(2)
2019–2020	Khor Fakkan	12	(1)
2020	Botafogo-SP	34	(0)
2021	Novorizontino	0	(0)
2021–2023	Farense	54	(3)
2023–2024	Al-Jandal	14	(1)
2024	Dalian Yingbo	27	(1)
Total		228	(8)
- * Club domestic league appearances and goals

Róbson Januário de Paula (born February 14, 1994) is a Brazilian former professional footballer who played as a defender.

== Club career ==
=== Breakthrough and loan to Kawasaki Frontale ===
Róbson was a product of by Bahia's youth academy. In July 2013, he was loaned to Kawasaki Frontale. Due to the injuries of Kawasaki Frontale's centre backs, Yusuke Igawa, Hiroki Ito and Jun Sonoda, Róbson was signed to increase squad's depth. However he only made one appearance for the club which was in Emperor's Cup and returned to Bahia when his loan spell was expired.

==== Esteghlal (loan) ====
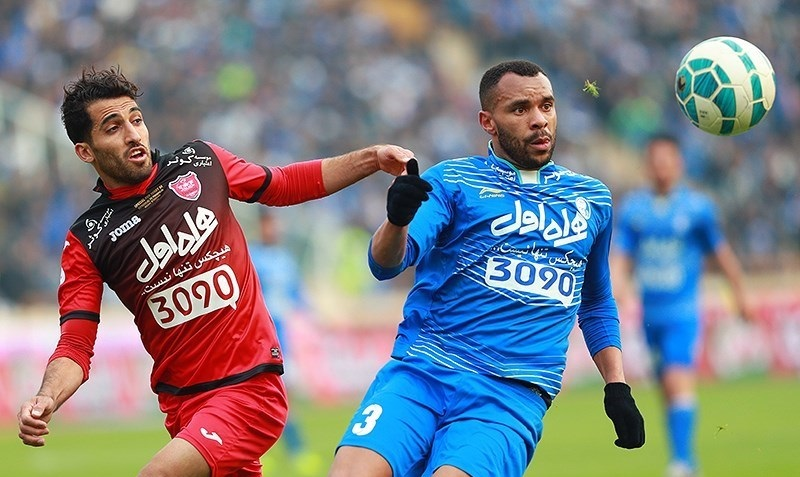
Róbson (right) in Tehran derby

On 17 July 2016, Róbson signed for Esteghlal F.C. on loan until the end of the 2016–17 season. He made his debut for the club on 31 July 2016 in a 2–1 loss against Esteghlal Khuzestan. After joining Esteghlal, he quickly established himself and became a regular starter in the team. During the season, he made a good partnership with compatriot Padovani in central defense. On 16 September he played his first Tehran derby against city rivals Persepolis which ended with a goalless draw. On 2 February 2017, he started the AFC Champions League qualifying play-off match facing Al Sadd SC which Esteghlal won in a 4–3 penalty shoot-out following a 0–0 draw following extra time. On 12 February he played the Second Tehran derby, which ended with a 3–2 victory for Esteghlal. After his stunning performance against Al-Ahli on 25 April 2017, he was included in 2017 AFC Champions League team of the week. He finished the season with 23 appearances as Esteghlal finished the season as runners-up in the league.

=== Boavista ===
In July 2017, Robson signed with Portuguese club Boavista signing a three-year deal. He made his debut in a 2–1 defeat against Portimonense S.C.

=== Botafogo-SP ===
On 13 February 2020, Robson returned to Brazil and signed with Botafogo-SP.

=== Al-Jandal ===
On 12 July 2023, Robson joined Saudi Arabian club Al-Jandal.

=== Dalian Yingbo ===
On 21 February 2024, Robson joined China League One club Dalian Yingbo as the first foreign player ever.

On 19 October 2025, Robson had his retirement ceremony at Dalian Suoyuwan Football Stadium before Dalian Yingbo's home game.

== Career statistics ==
=== Club ===
As of match played 3 November 2024

Appearances and goals by club, season and competition
Club	Season	League			State League		National Cup		League Cup		Continental		Other		Total	
Club	Season	Division	Apps	Goals	Apps	Goals	Apps	Goals	Apps	Goals	Apps	Goals	Apps	Goals	Apps	Goals
Bahia	2012	Série A	—		0	0	—		—		—		—		0	0
Bahia	2014	Série A	0	0	0	0	0	0	—		—		0	0	0	0
Bahia	2015	Série B	27	0	4	1	5	0	—		2	0	3	0	41	1
Bahia	2016	Série B	0	0	7	2	3	0	—		—		6	0	16	2
Bahia	Total		27	0	11	3	8	0	—		2	0	9	0	57	3
Kawasaki Frontale (loan)	2013	J1 League	0	0	—		0	0	1	0	—		—		1	0
Esteghlal (loan)	2016–17	Persian Gulf Pro League	24	0	—		3	0	—		9	0	—		36	0
Boavista	2017–18	Primeira Liga	13	0	—		0	0	0	0	—		—		13	0
Boavista	2018–19	Primeira Liga	—		—		0	0	—		—		—		0	0
Boavista	Total		13	0	—		0	0	0	0	—		—		13	0
Baniyas	2018–19	UAE Pro League	23	2	—		1	0	8	0	—		—		32	2
Khor Fakkan	2019–20	UAE Pro League	12	1	—		1	0	6	0	—		—		19	1
Botafogo-SP	2020	Série B	34	0	8	0	—		—		—		—		42	0
Novorizontino	2021	Série C	—		9	0	—		—		—		—		9	0
Farense	2021–22	Liga Portugal 2	27	2	—		2	0	—		—		—		29	2
Farense	2022–23	Liga Portugal 2	27	1	—		1	0	2	0	—		—		30	1
Farense	Total		54	3	—		3	0	2	0	—		—		59	3
Al-Jandal	2023–24	First Division League	14	1	—		—		—		—		—		14	1
Dalian Yingbo	2024	China League One	27	1	—		0	0	—		—		—		27	1
Career total			228	8	28	3	18	0	17	0	11	0	9	0	311	11
