= Bahman Tahmasebi =

Iranian footballer (born 1980)

Personal information
- Full name: Bahman Tahmasebi Jorshari
- Date of birth: July 28, 1980 (age 46)
- Place of birth: Noshahr, Iran
- Height: 1.90 m (6 ft 3 in)
- Position: Striker

Youth career
- Irsotter Noshahr

Senior career*
Years	Team	Apps	(Gls)
1999–2000	Irsotter Noshahr		
2000–2001	Esteghlal		
2001–2002	Fajr Sepasi		(4)
2002–2005	Paykan		(13)
2005–2006	Pegah		
2006–2008	Moghavemat Sepasi	59	(15)
2008–2010	Sepahan	39	(3)
2010–2011	Naft Tehran	19	(3)
2011–2012	Aluminium Hormozgan	26	(13)
2012–2013	Saba Qom	19	(0)
2013–2014	Padideh Shandiz	16	(4)
2014	Mes Kerman	8	(0)
2014–2015	Nassaji Mazandaran	7	(1)
2016–2017	Sardar Bukan		
- * Club domestic league appearances and goals as of 21 September 2017

Bahman Tahmasebi (Persian: بهمن طهماسبی, born July 28, 1980) is a retired Iranian footballer who played as a striker.

== Club career ==
Tahmasebi appeared in Irsotter where he moved to Esteghlal halfway through his first season, scoring few goals. He moved back to Fajr Sepasi and stayed for one season and moved to Paykan where he stayed for three seasons. He moved to Pegah and Fajr Sepasi, and later to Sepahan in summer 2008.

=== Club career statistics ===
Last Update 23 October 2013

Club performance			League		Cup		Continental		Total	
Season	Club	League	Apps	Goals	Apps	Goals	Apps	Goals	Apps	Goals
Iran			League		Hazfi Cup		Asia		Total	
1999–00	Esteghlal	Azadegan League(Iran's Time First Tier)		10			–	–		
2000-01	Esteghlal	Azadegan League(Iran's Time First Tier)		3			–	–		
2001–02	Fajr	Pro League		4			–	–		
2002–03	Paykan	Pro League		3			–	–		
2003–04	Paykan	Pro League		8			–	–		
2004–05	Paykan	Pro League	21	2			–	–		
2005–06	Pegah	Division 1					–	–		
2006–07	Fajr	Pro League	25	6			–	–		
2007–08	Fajr	Pro League	34	9			–	–		
2008–09	Sepahan	Pro League	24	4		0	2	0		4
2009–10	Sepahan	Pro League	15	0			0	0		
2010–11	Naft Tehran	Pro League	7	3	1	0	–	–	8	0
2011–12	Aluminium	Division 1	26	13	0	0	–	–	26	13
2012–13	Saba	Pro League	19	0	0	0	0	0	19	0
2013–14	Padideh	Division 1	16	4	1	1	–	–	17	5
Total	Iran						2	0		
Total	Career total						2	0		

- Assist Goals

Season	Team	Assists
06–07	Fajr	1
08–09	Sepahan	2
10–11	Naft Tehran	1

== Honours ==
=== Club ===
Sepahan

- Iran Pro League (1): 2009–10

Aluminium

- Azadegan League runner-up (1): 2011–12

=== Individual ===
- Azadegan League top scorer (1): 2011–12
