= F.C. Iranjavan Bushehr =

FC Iranjavan
- Full name: Football Club Iranjavan Bushehr
- Nickname: Red Devils of Bushehr
- Founded: 1948; 78 years ago
- Ground: Shahid Beheshti Stadium, Bushehr, Iran
- Capacity: 15,000
- Chairman: Ali Vaziri
- League: League 2
- 2017–18: Azadegan League, 16th (relegated)
Home colours	Away colours

Football Club Iranjavan Bushehr (Persian: باشگاه فوتبال ايران جوان بوشهر), commonly known as FC Iranjavan, is an Iranian football club based in Bushehr, Iran. They currently compete in the Azadegan League. The club was founded in 1948.

Iranjavan plays in a derby with fellow Bushehri side Shahin Bushehr, they also compete in a provincial derby against Pars Jonoubi Jam.

== History ==
Iranjavan Bushehr Football Club was founded in 1942 in Bushehr and is one of the oldest team in the province. The team competed in the provincial leagues for most of the 1990s. Iranjavan has never been promoted to the top level of Iranian football.

== Season-by-season ==
The table below chronicles the achievements of Iranjavan in various competitions since 1990.

Season	League	Position	Hazfi Cup	Notes
1990–91	Bushehr Province League	1st		Promoted
1991–92	2nd Division	6th
1992–93	2nd Division	6th		Relegated
1993–94	Bushehr Province League	1st
1994–95	2nd Division	5th
1995–96	Bushehr Province League	2nd
1996–97	Bushehr Province League	1st
1997–98	Bushehr Province League	6th
1998–99	Bushehr Province League	3rd
1999–00	Bushehr Province League	5th
2000–01	Bushehr Province League	3rd
2001–02	Bushehr Province League	2nd
2002–03	Bushehr Province League	5th
2003–04	Bushehr Province League	1st	Did not qualify	Promoted
2004–05	Azadegan League	10th	First Round
2005–06	Azadegan League	12th	First Round	Relegated
2006–07	2nd Division	5th	Did not qualify
2007–08	2nd Division	8th	Did not qualify
2008–09	2nd Division	3rd	First Round	Promoted
2009–10	Azadegan League	10th	1/16 Final
2010–11	Azadegan League	8th	1/16 Final
2011–12	Azadegan League	2nd	Third Round
2012–13	Azadegan League	7th	Did not qualify
2013–14	Azadegan League	4th	Third Round
2014–15	Azadegan League	8th	Third Round
2015–16	Azadegan League	13th	Did not participate
2016–17	Azadegan League	12th	Second Round
2017–18	Azadegan League	16th	Quarter Final	Relegated
2018–19	2nd Division	13th	Second Round
2019–20	2nd Division	12th	Did not participate
2020–21	2nd Division	7th	Did not participate
2021–22	2nd Division	14th	Did not participate	Relegated
2022–23	3rd Division - 2nd Stage		Did not qualify

== Club managers ==
- (Iran) Nasser Ebrahimi (Sep 2008–Oct 09)
- (Iran) Abdolrahim Khorazmi (Oct 2009–Jan 2010)
- (Iran) Asghar Sharafi (Jan 2010–Jan 2011)
- (Iran) Mohammad Abbasi (Jan 2011–Aug 2011)
- (Iran) Abdolrahim Kharazmi (Aug 2011–Jun 2012)
- (Iran) Ahmad Sanjari (Jun 2012–Jan 2013)
- (North Macedonia) Zoran Smilevski (Jan 2013–Jul 2013)
- (Iran) Gholamreza Delgarm (Jul 2013–Aug 2015 )
- (Iran) Saeed Moftakhar (Aug 2015– )

== Club chairmen ==
- (Iran) Ali vaziri
- (Iran) Reza Farahmandnia

== First-team squad ==
Note: Flags indicate national team as defined under FIFA eligibility rules; some limited exceptions apply. Players may hold more than one non-FIFA nationality.

No.	Pos.	Nation	Player
1	GK	IRN	Saeid Ebrahimpour
22	GK	IRN	Hamid Heidari
40	GK	IRN	Alireza Khajeh Monafred
80	DF	IRN	Gholamhossein Moji
5	DF	IRN	Amin Tahmoursi
33	DF	IRN	Mohammadreza Najafi
20	DF	IRN	Ali Momenzadeh
70	DF	IRN	Sajjad Mashayekh
2	DF	IRN	Ramin Dehghani
21	DF	IRN	Reza Boulivand
6	DF	IRN	Mehdi Taheri
—	MF	IRN	Alireza Zarei
—	MF	IRN	Amin Mashayekh
—	MF	IRN	Salman Bahrani

No.	Pos.	Nation	Player
—	MF	IRN	Abbas Chapi
—	MF	IRN	Mostafa Ahmadi
9	FW	IRN	Aslan Hosseini
—	MF	IRN	Ehsan Asadzadeh
—	MF	IRN	Pouya Khaleghpanah
—	MF	IRN	Saeid Ghani
—	MF	IRN	Saeid Kolati
—	MF	IRN	Gholam Ahmad Shahi
—	MF	IRN	Hossein Hejazipour
—	FW	IRN	Mohammad Taremi
—	FW	IRN	Sajjad Feizollahi
—	FW	IRN	Mehdi Almasi
—	FW	IRN	Ahmad Kia
