= 2013–14 Iran Football's 3rd Division =

Iran Football's 3rd Division
- Season: 2013–14

The article contains information about the 2013–14 Iran 3rd Division football season. This is the 4th rated football league in Iran after the Persian Gulf Cup, Azadegan League, and 2nd Division. The league started from September 2013.

In total and in the first round, 60 teams will compete in 5 different groups of 12. From the first round, 10 teams (2 from each group) go through the second round. In the second round 10 teams from 1st round and 14 temas from previous season (8 teams relegated from 2nd division + 1 team relegated from 1st division + 5 top teams from 3rd division) will be divided into 2 groups of 12, where the winner and runner-up of each group will be directly promoted to 2014–15 Iran Football's 2nd Division. The two group runner-up will go through play-off matches, where the play-off winner also will be promoted. Therefore, in total, five team will be promoted from this league to Iran Football's 2nd Division.

== Teams ==
The following 72 teams will compete in 2012–13 Iran Football's 3rd Division season.

- Alborz Shahrdari Zanjan
- Amir Kabir Shazand Arak
- Azar Kowsar Tabriz
- Bam Mashhad o Reza
- Bargh Urumia
- Bazargani Bahadori Kovar
- Caspian Chaloosh
- Daam & Toyour Ravansar
- Dorost Karan Moghan
- Ekbatan Kowsar Tehran
- Ettehad Andimeshk
- Esteghlal B Tehran
- Esteghlal Jonub Tehran
- Esteghlal Molasani
- Esteghlal Novin Qazvin
- Esteghlal Qaemshahr
- Farhang Ramhormoz
- Gahar Novin Dorud
- Grand Khorasan
- Helal Ahmar Gerash
- Helal Ahmar Ilam
- Hermas Tabriz
- Iranjavan Khoormooj Bushehr
- Khalkhal Dasht Ardebil
- Khazar Mahmoudabad
- Khoone Be Khooneh Amir Kala
- Mahtab Baft Shaft
- Mes Novin Kerman
- Novin Noforest Birjand
- Oghab Tehran
- Oghab Gonbad Kavoos
- Omran Karan Ardebil
- Panah Afarin Qom
- Pars Football Chaloos
- Patu Laleh Isfahan
- Perspolis Zahedan
- Piroozi Garmsar
- Piruzi Kamyaran
- Rahpooyan Rezvanshahr
- Sadat Dehdasht
- Salsal Lisar Talesh
- Shahed Firooz Abad
- Shahin Karaj
- Shahin Kuhrang Shahrekord
- Shahrdari Bam
- Shahrdari Baneh
- Shahrdari Hamedan
- Shahrdari Lahijan
- Shahrdari Mahshahr
- Shahrdari Naghadeh
- Shahrdari Nazarabad
- Shahrdari Novin Bandar Abbas
- Shahrdari Semnan
- Shohada Arteshe Isfahan
- Shohada Sari
- Tohid Bushehr
- Vahdat Khavaran Birjand
- Zagros Bamaei
- Zob Ahan Novin
- Zob Felezat Alvand Bahar Hamedan
- Ashian Gostaran Varamin
- Chooka Talesh
- Dartak Lorestan
- Datis Lorestan
- Mes Shahr-e Babak
- Moghavemat Tehran
- Naftoon Tehran
- Omid Hassanabad
- Sadra Neka
- Saipa Mehr Karaj
- Shahrdari Behshahr
- Yadavaran Shalamcheh

== First round (standings) ==
=== Group 1 ===
Pos	Team	Pld	W	D	L	GF	GA	GD	Pts	Qualification or relegation
1	Esteghlal Qaemshahr	11	7	4	0	22	6	+16	25	Promotion to the second round
2	Khoneh Be Khoneh	11	8	1	2	21	6	+15	25	Promotion to the second round
3	Shohada Sari	11	7	3	1	24	8	+16	24	
4	Esteghlal Jonub Tehran	10	6	3	1	22	9	+13	21	
5	Bam Mashhad o Reza	10	6	3	1	18	8	+10	21	Relegation to the Provincial Leagues
6	Caspian Chaloos	11	2	6	3	12	12	0	12	Relegation to the Provincial Leagues
7	Piroozi Garmsar	11	4	0	7	16	20	−4	12	Relegation to the Provincial Leagues
8	Ekbatan Kowsar Tehran	11	3	3	5	11	19	−8	12	Relegation to the Provincial Leagues
9	Oghab Gonbad Kavoos	11	2	3	6	8	18	−10	9	Relegation to the Provincial Leagues
10	Shahrdari Semnan	11	2	2	7	12	30	−18	8	Relegation to the Provincial Leagues
11	Gerand Khorasan Shomali	11	1	2	8	14	28	−14	5	Relegation to the Provincial Leagues
12	Panah Afarin Qom	11	1	2	8	16	28	−12	5	Relegation to the Provincial Leagues

Updated to match(es) played on 5 March 2013. Source:
Rules for classification: 1) points; 2) goal difference; 3) number of goals scored.

=== Group 2 ===
Pos	Team	Pld	W	D	L	GF	GA	GD	Pts	Qualification or relegation
1	Rahpooyan Rezvanshahr F.C.	11	8	3	0	19	7	+12	27	Promotion to the second round
2	Esteghlal Abi B Tehran	0	0	0	0	0	0	0	0	Promotion to the second round
3	-	0	0	0	0	0	0	0	0	
4	-	0	0	0	0	0	0	0	0	
5	-	0	0	0	0	0	0	0	0	Relegation to the Provincial Leagues
6	-	0	0	0	0	0	0	0	0	Relegation to the Provincial Leagues
7	-	0	0	0	0	0	0	0	0	Relegation to the Provincial Leagues
8	-	0	0	0	0	0	0	0	0	Relegation to the Provincial Leagues
9	-	0	0	0	0	0	0	0	0	Relegation to the Provincial Leagues
10	-	0	0	0	0	0	0	0	0	Relegation to the Provincial Leagues
11	-	0	0	0	0	0	0	0	0	Relegation to the Provincial Leagues
12	-	0	0	0	0	0	0	0	0	Relegation to the Provincial Leagues

Updated to match(es) played on 5 March 2013. Source:
Rules for classification: 1) points; 2) goal difference; 3) number of goals scored.

=== Group 3 ===
Pos	Team	Pld	W	D	L	GF	GA	GD	Pts	Qualification or relegation
1	Be'sat Kermanshah	11	8	1	2	20	8	+12	25	Promotion to the second round
2	-	0	0	0	0	0	0	0	0	Promotion to the second round
3	-	0	0	0	0	0	0	0	0	
4	-	0	0	0	0	0	0	0	0	
5	-	0	0	0	0	0	0	0	0	Relegation to the Provincial Leagues
6	-	0	0	0	0	0	0	0	0	Relegation to the Provincial Leagues
7	-	0	0	0	0	0	0	0	0	Relegation to the Provincial Leagues
8	-	0	0	0	0	0	0	0	0	Relegation to the Provincial Leagues
9	-	0	0	0	0	0	0	0	0	Relegation to the Provincial Leagues
10	-	0	0	0	0	0	0	0	0	Relegation to the Provincial Leagues
11	-	0	0	0	0	0	0	0	0	Relegation to the Provincial Leagues
12	-	0	0	0	0	0	0	0	0	Relegation to the Provincial Leagues

Updated to match(es) played on 5 March 2013. Source:
Rules for classification: 1) points; 2) goal difference; 3) number of goals scored.

=== Group 4 ===
Pos	Team	Pld	W	D	L	GF	GA	GD	Pts	Relegation
1	Iranjavan Khoormooj	11	8	1	2	25	8	+17	25	Promotion to the second round
2	-	0	0	0	0	0	0	0	0	Promotion to the second round
3	-	0	0	0	0	0	0	0	0	
4	-	0	0	0	0	0	0	0	0	
5	-	0	0	0	0	0	0	0	0	Relegation to the Provincial Leagues
6	-	0	0	0	0	0	0	0	0	Relegation to the Provincial Leagues
7	-	0	0	0	0	0	0	0	0	Relegation to the Provincial Leagues
8	-	0	0	0	0	0	0	0	0	Relegation to the Provincial Leagues
9	-	0	0	0	0	0	0	0	0	Relegation to the Provincial Leagues
10	-	0	0	0	0	0	0	0	0	Relegation to the Provincial Leagues
11	-	0	0	0	0	0	0	0	0	Relegation to the Provincial Leagues
12	-	0	0	0	0	0	0	0	0	Relegation to the Provincial Leagues

Updated to match(es) played on 5 March 2013. Source:
Rules for classification: 1) points; 2) goal difference; 3) number of goals scored.

=== Group 5 ===
Pos	Team	Pld	W	D	L	GF	GA	GD	Pts	Qualification or relegation
1	Zob Ahan Novin Isfahan	10	7	1	2	18	12	+6	22	Promotion to the second round
2	-	0	0	0	0	0	0	0	0	Promotion to the second round
3	-	0	0	0	0	0	0	0	0	
4	-	0	0	0	0	0	0	0	0	
5	-	0	0	0	0	0	0	0	0	Relegation to the Provincial Leagues
6	-	0	0	0	0	0	0	0	0	Relegation to the Provincial Leagues
7	-	0	0	0	0	0	0	0	0	Relegation to the Provincial Leagues
8	-	0	0	0	0	0	0	0	0	Relegation to the Provincial Leagues
9	-	0	0	0	0	0	0	0	0	Relegation to the Provincial Leagues
10	-	0	0	0	0	0	0	0	0	Relegation to the Provincial Leagues
11	-	0	0	0	0	0	0	0	0	Relegation to the Provincial Leagues
12	-	0	0	0	0	0	0	0	0	Relegation to the Provincial Leagues

Updated to match(es) played on 5 March 2012. Source:
Rules for classification: 1) points; 2) goal difference; 3) number of goals scored.

== Second round ==
=== Group A ===
Pos	Team	Pld	W	D	L	GF	GA	GD	Pts	Promotion or qualification
1	Esteghlal B Tehran	22	11	7	4	35	24	+11	40	Promotion to 2nd Division 2014–15
2	Khoneh Be Khoneh	22	10	8	4	30	12	+18	38	Promotion to 2nd Division 2014–15
3	Rahpouyan Rezvanshahr	22	10	6	6	28	19	+9	36	3rd Division 2014–15 Play Off
4	Chooka	22	10	6	6	33	21	+12	36	Second round - 3rd Division 2014-15
5	Moghavemat Tehran	22	9	7	6	22	27	−5	34	Second round - 3rd Division 2014-15
6	Omid Hasanabad	22	9	7	6	17	14	+3	34	First round - 3rd Division 2014-15
7	Est. Qaemshahr	22	9	4	9	22	22	0	31	First round - 3rd Division 2014-15
8	Sh. Behshahr	22	8	5	9	21	17	+4	29	First round - 3rd Division 2014-15
9	Naftoon Tehran	22	6	7	9	21	17	+4	25	First round - 3rd Division 2014-15
10	Sadra Neka	22	7	3	12	18	21	−3	24	First round - 3rd Division 2014-15
11	Khazar Mahmoudabad	22	3	6	13	12	26	−14	15	First round - 3rd Division 2014-15
12	Mehr Karaj	22	2	7	13	17	46	−29	13	First round - 3rd Division 2014-15

Updated to match(es) played on 16 February 2015. Source:
Rules for classification: 1) points; 2) goal difference; 3) number of goals scored.

=== Group B ===
Pos	Team	Pld	W	D	L	GF	GA	GD	Pts	Promotion or qualification
1	Zob Ahan Novin	20	11	6	3	38	15	+23	39	Promotion to 2nd Division 2015–16
2	Iranjavan Khoormooj	20	12	2	6	25	18	+7	38	Promotion to 2nd Division 2015–16
3	Be'sat Kermanshah	20	10	7	3	29	12	+17	37	3rd Division 2015–16 Play Off
4	Yadavaran Shalamcheh	20	11	4	5	18	11	+7	37	Second round - 3rd Division 2015-16
5	Farhang Ramhormoz	20	10	3	7	24	16	+8	33	Second round - 3rd Division 2015-16
6	Bazargani Bahadorani Kovar	6	2	2	2	3	5	−2	8	First round - 3rd Division 2015-16
7	Kheybar Khorramabad	6	2	2	2	3	6	−3	8	First round - 3rd Division 2015-16
8	Sh. Arak	6	2	1	3	6	6	0	7	First round - 3rd Division 2015-16
9	Pouyandegan Marvdasht	6	2	1	3	3	5	−2	7	First round - 3rd Division 2015-16
10	Persepolis Zahedan	6	1	3	2	7	6	+1	6	First round - 3rd Division 2015-16
11	Naftoon Masjed Soleyman	6	1	2	3	3	8	−5	5	First round - 3rd Division 2015-16
12	Minab Toyur	6	0	1	5	3	9	−6	1	First round - 3rd Division 2015-16

Updated to match(es) played on 7 February 2015. Source:
Rules for classification: 1) points; 2) goal difference; 3) number of goals scored.
