= Yazd Louleh F.C. =

Iranian football club

Yazd Louleh
- Full name: Yazd Louleh Football Club
- Founded: 2012
- Dissolved: 2014
- Ground: Nassiri Stadium; Yazd, Iran
- Capacity: 6,000
- Chairman: mostafa hosseini
- Manager: amir mehdi hosseini
- League: Azadegan League
- 2013–14: Azadegan League Group 2, 10th
| Home colours | Away colours |

Yazd Louleh Football Club is an Iranian football club based in Yazd, Iran.

== History ==
In June 2012, Sang Ahan Bafgh company bought the license of Tarbiat Yazd football club in order to participate in 2012–13 Azadegan League. The team was moved back to Yazd in 2013 after it was originally moved from Yazd in 2012. In October 2014, the club sold its license to Tarbiat Novin, and was dissolved due financial circumstances.

== Name history ==
- Sang Ahan Bafgh (2012–2013)
- Yazd Louleh (2013–2014)

== Players ==
As of November 23, 2012

=== First-team squad ===
Note: Flags indicate national team as defined under FIFA eligibility rules; some limited exceptions apply. Players may hold more than one non-FIFA nationality.

| No. | Pos. | Nation | Player |
|---|---|---|---|
| — | GK | IRN | Jalal Abdi |
| — | FW | IRN | Masoud Abtahi |
| — | MF | IRN | Abbas Aghaei |
| — | | IRN | Foad Aghaei |
| — | MF | IRN | Hossein Ahmadloo |
| — | | IRN | Ali AliPour |
| — | GK | IRN | Ahmad Arab Pour |
| — | DF | IRN | Morteza Aziz Mohammadi |
| — | | IRN | Hamed Basiri |
| — | MF | IRN | Saeed Bayat |
| — | DF | IRN | Mojtaba Ensafi |

| No. | Pos. | Nation | Player |
|---|---|---|---|
| — | FW | IRN | Mohammad Faal |
| — | DF | IRN | Abolfazl Ghorbani |
| — | MF | IRN | Morteza Ghorbanpour |
| — | MF | IRN | Amir Reza Khan Mohammadi |
| — | FW | IRN | Mehrzad Mir |
| — | GK | IRN | Ebrahim Mirzapour |
| — | MF | IRN | Mehrzad Rezaei |
| — | MF | IRN | Shahin Shafiei |
| — | | IRN | Milad Sharifat |
| — | GK | IRN | Hamid Sherkat o Abassi |

== Season-by-Season ==
The table below shows the achievements of the club in various competitions.

| Season | League | Position | Hazfi Cup | Notes |
|---|---|---|---|---|
| 2012–13 | Azadegan League | 7th | 1/16 Final |
| 2013–14 | Azadegan League | 10th | 1/16 Final |
| 2019–20 | 3rd Division - 1st Stage | 3rd (Group E) | Did not qualify | Promoted |
| 2019–20 | 3rd Division - 2nd Stage | 3rd (Group 3) | Did not qualify | Promoted to Play-Offs (1st Round) |
| 2020–21 | 3rd Division - 2nd Stage | 9th (Group 3) | Did not qualify | Relegated |
| 2021–22 | 3rd Division - 1st Stage | 1st (Group E) | Did not qualify | Promoted |
| 2021–22 | 3rd Division - 2nd Stage | 4th (Group 3) | Did not qualify |
| 2022–23 | 3rd Division - 2nd Stage | 8th (Group 3) | Did not qualify | Relegated |

== See also ==
- Hazfi Cup
