= Ahmad Amir Kamdar =

Iranian footballer

Personal information
- Full name: Ahmad Amir Kamdar
- Date of birth: 5 January 1989 (age 37)
- Place of birth: Tabriz, Iran
- Height: 1.84 m (6 ft 1/2 in)
- Position: Midfielder

Team information
- Current team: Naft Tehran
- Number: 7

Youth career
- 2008–2010: Mes Kerman

Senior career*
| Years | Team | Apps | (Gls) |
| 2008–2010 | Mes Kerman | 8 | (0) |
| 2010–2012 | Moghavemat Tehran | | |
| 2012–2014 | Gostaresh Foolad | 41 | (1) |
| 2014–2015 | Tractor Sazi | 26 | (11) |
| 2015 | Siah Jamegan | 11 | (1) |
| 2015–2016 | Zob Ahan | 7 | (1) |
| 2016–2017 | Machine Sazi | 16 | (1) |
| 2017–2018 | Naft Tehran | 19 | (0) |
| 2018 | Shahrdari Tabriz F.C. | | |

International career
| 2007–2008 | Iran U20 | | |
| 2009–2012 | Iran U23 | | |
- * Club domestic league appearances and goals as of 9 March 2017

Ahmad Amir Kamdar (Persian: احمد امیرکامدار, born 5 January 1989) is an Iranian footballer who currently plays for Naft Tehran in the Persian Gulf Pro League.

== Club career ==
=== Mes Kerman ===
Amir Kamdarhas became a part of Pas Academy in 2008. He was promoted to the first team in winter 2008 with a 2-year contract.

=== Moghavemat Tehran ===
In 2010–11 season, he joined Moghavemat Tehran for two seasons to end his conscription career.

=== Gostaresh Foolad ===
He joined Gostaresh in summer 2012. He made his debut for Zob Ahan in the first fixture of 2012–13 Azadegan League as a midfielder. He scored his first goal for the club in the 15th week in the 2013–14 Iran Pro League against Foolad.

=== Zob Ahan ===
In the winter of 2016 Ahmad signed an 18-month contract with Iran Pro League side Zob Ahan.

== Club career statistics ==
As of 1 January 2016.

| Club | Division | Season | League | | Hazfi Cup | | Asia | | Total | |
| Club | Division | Season | Apps | Goals | Apps | Goals | Apps | Goals | Apps | Goals |
|---|---|---|---|---|---|---|---|---|---|---|
| Gostaresh Foolad | Division 1 | 2012–13 | 25 | 0 | 0 | 0 | – | – | 25 | 0 |
| Gostaresh Foolad | Pro League | 2013–14 | 19 | 1 | 0 | 0 | – | – | 19 | 1 |
| Tractor Sazi | Pro League | 2014–15 | 26 | 0 | 0 | 0 | – | – | 26 | 0 |
| Siah Jamegan | Pro League | 2015–16 | 12 | 1 | 1 | 0 | – | – | 13 | 1 |
| Zob Ahan | Pro League | 2015–16 | 7 | 1 | 0 | 0 | 6 | 0 | 13 | 1 |
| Career Totals | | | 89 | 3 | 1 | 0 | 6 | 0 | 96 | 3 |

== Honours ==
=== Club ===
Tractor Sazi

- Iran Pro League Runner-up: 2014–15

Zob Ahan

- Hazfi Cup: 2015–16
