= Edmond Yunanpour =

Iranian footballer and manager

Personal information
- Full name: Edmond Yunanpour
- Date of birth: 1963 (age 62–63)
- Place of birth: Ahvaz, Iran

Team information
- Current team: Foolad Yazd

Managerial career
- Years: Team
- PAS Tehran
- Keshavarzi
- Saba Battery (youth squad)
- Bargh
- Rah Ahan
- Aboomoslem
- 2010: Damash Lorestan
- 2010: Shirin Faraz
- 2011: Foolad Yazd
- 2012: Parse F.C.
- ‡ National team caps and goals as of 25 September 2010

Edmond Yunanpour is a retired Iranian football player and manager.

== Managerial career ==
Through his career, Yunanpour has managed several teams, including PAS Tehran, Keshavarzi, Saba Battery, Bargh, Rah Ahan, and Aboomoslem. At the start of the 2009–10 Azadegan League season, he was appointed the head coach of Damash Lorestan. However, after a disappointing start, he was fired and replaced with Markar Aghajanyan. Later in the year, he took over for Mahmoud Fekri, who resigned from his post as coach of Shirin Faraz. After the Death of Foolad Yazd F.C.'s Manager Mohsen Aghazadeh, he took over in 2011.
