= Behnam Mohammadi Stadium =

Stadium in Iran

Masjed Soleyman Stadium
- Naft MIS Stadium
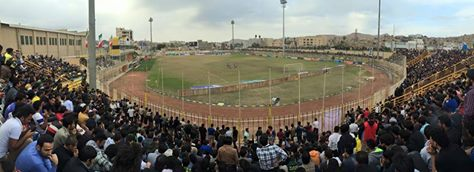
- Masjed Soleyman Stadium during a domestic match
- Interactive map of Masjed Soleyman Stadium
- Full name: Masjed Soleyman Stadium
- Location: Masjed Soleyman, Iran
- Coordinates: 31.934281°N 49.304006°E
- Owner: Naft Masjed Soleyman
- Capacity: 8,000
- Surface: Desso GrassMaster

Construction
- Built: 1908
- Opened: 1909
- Renovated: 2014
- Architect: John Merdak

Tenant
- Naft Masjed Soleyman

Masjed Soleyman Stadium (Persian: ورزشگاه مسجد سلیمان, Vârzeshgah-e Masjed Soleyman) is a multi-purpose stadium, located in Masjed Soleyman City, Khuzestan Province, Iran. It is used mostly for football matches. The stadium is the first modern venue in Iran, being built in 1908. It has a capacity of 8,000 people and is owned by Persian Gulf Pro League side Naft Masjed Soleyman.
