= Saleh Mostafavi =

Iranian football coach

Saleh mostafavi
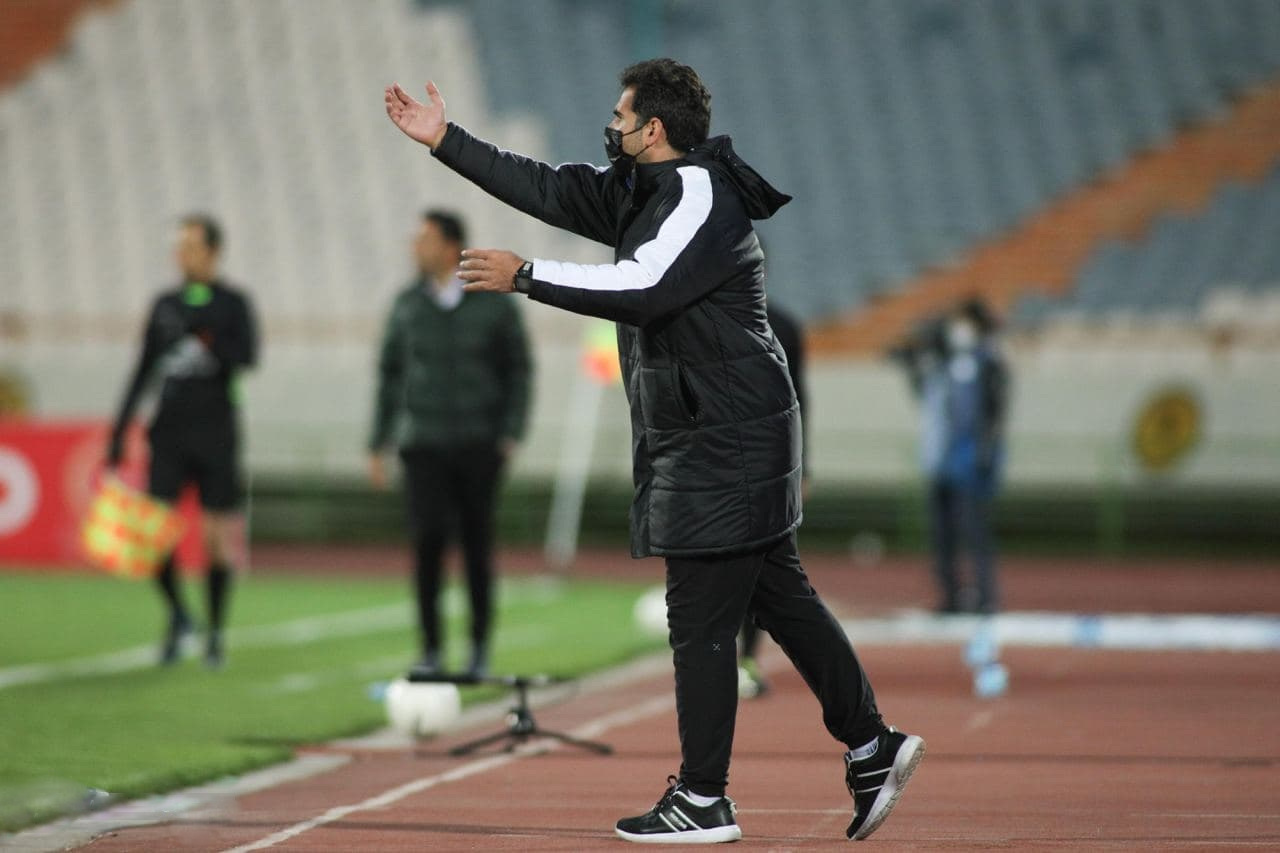

Personal information
- Full name: Seyedmohammadsaleh mostafavi
- Date of birth: 26 April 1983 (age 43)
- Place of birth: Mashhad, Iran
- Height: 1.80 m (5 ft 11 in)

Senior career*
Years	Team	Apps	(Gls)
2006–2007	Nirooye Zamini		

International career
2006	Iran		

Managerial career
- 2008–2009: Aboomoslem (Analyzer)
- 2010-2012: Iran U23 (Analyzer)
- 2012-2013: Al-Nasr (Dubai) (Analyzer)
- 2013-2014: Al Jazira (Analyzer)
- 2014-2016: Naft Tehran (Assistant Coach)
- 2016-2018: Esteghlal (Assistant Coach)
- 2018-2018: Iran (Analyzer)
- 2018-2022: Esteghlal (Assistant Coach & Interim Headcoach)
- 2022-2023: Al-Ittihad Kalba (Assistant Coach)
- * Club domestic league appearances and goals

Seyed Mohammad Saleh Mostafavi (Persian: صالح مصطفوی; born 26 April 1983), also known as Saleh Mostafavi, is an Iranian football coach and former player. He is currently working as an assistant coach at Al-Ittihad Kalba SC in UAE Pro League. Mostafavi in his career has the experience of playing in the Nirooye Zamini F.C. and also has the experience of playing in the Iran national beach soccer team. In the field of coaching, Mustafavi has the experience of working with figures such as Nasser Hejazi, Alireza Mansourian, Walter Zenga, Carlos Queiroz, Andrea Stramaccioni, Majid Namjoo-Motlagh and Farhad Majidi. He has an Asia A level coaching certificate and has gained championship experience as a coach with the Esteghlal F.C. in the 2021-22 season in Persian Gulf Pro League. He was also the temporary head coach of Esteghlal F.C. team for a short period.

== Career statistics ==
Team	Post	Coach	From	To	Achievement
Aboomoslem	Analyzer	Nasser Hejazi	2008	2009	-
Iran U23	Analyzer	Alireza Mansourian	2010	2012	Advance to the final stage of the AFC U-23 Asian Cup
Al-Nasr SC (Dubai)	Analyzer	Walter Zenga	2012	2013	Fourth place in the UAE Pro League Promotion to the group stage of the AFC Champions League
Al Jazira	Analyzer	Walter Zenga	2013	2014	The third place in the UAE Pro League Promotion to the round of 16 of the AFC Champions League
Naft Tehran	Assistant Coach	Alireza Mansourian	2014	2016	Third place in Persian Gulf Pro League Promotion to the quarter-finals of the AFC Champions League Advancing to the finals of Iranian Hazfi Cup
Esteghlal	Assistant Coach	Alireza Mansourian	2016	2018	Second place in the Persian Gulf Pro League Promotion to the round of 16 of the AFC Champions League
Iran	Analyzer	Carlos Queiroz	2018	2018	-
Esteghlal	Assistant Coach Interim Headcoach	Andrea StramaccioniMajid Namjoo-MotlaghFarhad Majidi	2018	2019	Second place in the Persian Gulf Pro League Promotion to the round of 16 of the AFC Champions League Advancing to the finals of Iranian Hazfi Cup
Esteghlal	Assistant Coach	Farhad Majidi	2019	2022	An unbeaten championship in Persian Gulf Pro League The record holder of the fewest goals against The record holder for the most wins The record holder of the most points in the history of the Persian Gulf Pro League Promotion to the round of 16 of the AFC Champions League
Al-Ittihad Kalba	Assistant Coach	Farhad Majidi	2022	2023	Obtaining the best ranking in the history of the club Two games as temporary head coach of the second team

== Honours ==
- 8 seasons in the AFC Champions League (as an assistant Coach)
- 6 rounds of promotion to the round of 16 of the AFC Champions League (as an assistant Coach)
- 1 promotion period to the quarter-finals of the AFC Champions League (as an assistant Coach)
- Advancing to the final stage of the AFC U-23 Asian Cup (as an assistant Coach)
