= Mojtaba Haghdoust =

Iranian football midfielder

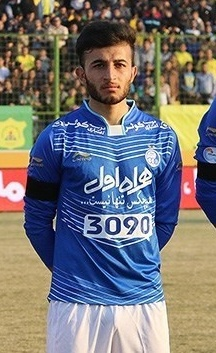

Personal information
- Date of birth: 22 January 1996 (age 30)
- Place of birth: Baghmalek, Iran
- Height: 1.70 m (5 ft 7 in)
- Position: Attacking midfielder

Team information
- Current team: Esteghlal Khuzestan
- Number: 40

Youth career
- –2015: Karun Khuzestan
- 2015–2016: Naft Tehran

Senior career*
Years	Team	Apps	(Gls)
2013–2015	Karun Khuzestan		
2015–2017	Naft Tehran	29	(1)
2016–2017	→ Esteghlal (loan)	17	(2)
2018	Foolad	9	(0)
2018–2021	Zob Ahan	34	(1)
2018–2019	→ Fajr Sepasi (loan)	19	(3)
2021–2025	Paykan	73	(7)
2025	Havadar	15	(2)
2025–2026	Fajr Sepasi	12	(0)
2026–	Esteghlal Khuzestan	3	(0)
- * Club domestic league appearances and goals as of 16 April 2025

Mojtaba Haghdoust (Persian: مجتبی حق‌دوست; born 22 January 1996) is an Iranian football midfielder who plays for Esteghlal Khuzestan in the Persian Gulf Pro League.

== Club career ==
=== Naft Tehran ===
Haghdoust joined Naft Tehran in summer 2015. He made his professional debut for Naft Tehran in fixture XI of 2015–16 Iran Pro League against Esteghlal Khuzestan as a substitute for Arash Rezavand while he made an appearance against Diana Baghershahr on October 9, 2015.

=== Club career statistics ===
As of 27 May 2018

Club	Division	Season	League		Hazfi Cup		Asia		Total	
Club	Division	Season	Apps	Goals	Apps	Goals	Apps	Goals	Apps	Goals
Naft Tehran	Pro League	2015–16	15	1	0	0	0	0	15	1
Naft Tehran	Pro League	2016–17	1	0	0	0	–	–	1	0
Esteghlal (loan)	Pro League	2016–17	17	2	3	0	4	0	24	2
Naft Tehran	Pro League	2017–18	13	0	0	0	–	–	13	0
Foolad	Pro League	2017–18	9	0	0	0	–	–	9	0
Career Total			55	3	3	0	4	0	62	3
