= Bushehr Province League =

Bushehr Province league
- Country: Iran
- Confederation: AFC
- Number of clubs: 10
- Level on pyramid: 5
- Promotion to: 3rd Division
- Relegation to: Bushehr Province league 2
- Domestic cup: Hazfi Cup
- Broadcaster(s): IRIB

Bushehr Provincial League is the premier football league of Bushehr Province and is 5th in the Iranian football pyramid after the 3rd Division.It is part of the Vision Asia program.
