= Miad Yazdani =

Iranian footballer

Personal information
- Full name: Miad Yazdani Bejarsari
- Date of birth: 26 August 1992 (age 34)
- Place of birth: Rasht, Iran
- Height: 1.76 m (5 ft 9 1/2 in)
- Position: Winger

Team information
- Current team: Sepidrood Rasht
- Number: 88

Youth career
- 2010–2012: Esteghlal
- 2012–2014: Naft Tehran

Senior career*
Years	Team	Apps	(Gls)
2014–2016	Sepidrood	38	(15)
2016–2018	Esteghlal	4	(0)
2017–2018	→ Sepidrood (loan)	24	(1)
2018–	Sepidrood	0	(0)
- * Club domestic league appearances and goals as of 28 September 2017

Miad Yazdani Bejarsari (Persian: میعاد یزدانی بجارسری; born 26 August 1992) is an Iranian football midfielder who currently plays for Sepidrood Rasht in the Iran Pro League.

== Club career ==
=== Sepidrood ===
Yazdani started his career with Sepidrood Rasht. He helped the club in promoting to 2016–17 Azadegan League.

=== Esteghlal ===
On 31 July 2016, Yazdani joined Iranian Pro League club Esteghlal on a three-year contract. He made his debut for Esteghlal in Hazfi Cup match in 2–0 win against Malavan Novin on October 1, 2016, as a substitute for Khosro Heydari.

== Club career statistics ==
As of 27 February 2017

Club performance			League		Cup		Continental		Total	
Season	Club	League	Apps	Goals	Apps	Goals	Apps	Goals	Apps	Goals
Iran			League		Hazfi Cup		Asia		Total	
2016-17	Esteghlal	Pro League	4	0	1	0	1	0	6	0
2017-18	Sepidrood	Pro League	7	0	1	0	–		8	0
Career total			11	0	2	0	1	0	14	0
