= Sanati Kaveh Tehran F.C. =

Iranian football club

- Full name: Sanati Kaveh Tehran Football Club
- Founded: 2008
- Dissolved: 2012
- Ground: Aliaf Stadium, Tehran, Iran
- Capacity: 5,000
- Manager: (Iran) Ali Nikbakht
- League: Azadegan League
- 2011–12: Azadegan League Group 2, 13th
Home colours	Away colours

Sanati Kaveh Tehran F.C. (Persian: کاوه تهران) was an Iranian football, club was based in Tehran, Iran. They mostly competed in the Iranian first division, and hold home games at Aliaf Stadium. In 2012 Yadavaran Shalamcheh Hamyari took over the license.

== Seasons ==
The table below chronicles the achievements of Sanati Kaveh in various competitions since 2008.

Year	Division	Position	Hazfi Cup
2008–09	2nd Division	1st	First round
2009–10	Azadegan League	9th	1/16 Final
2010–11	Azadegan League	12th	1/8 Round
2011–12	Azadegan League	13th	Second Round

== Head coaches ==
- (Iran) Ahmad Khodadad (2008 – Mar 10)
- (Iran) Hossein Faraki (Mar 2010 – July 10)
- (Iran) Javad Zarrincheh (July 10 – February 11)
- (Iran) Farhad Kazemi (February 11 – ?)
- (Iran) Ali Nikbakht (2011)
- (Iran) Saket Elhami (2011)
- (Iran) Majid Namjoo-Motlagh (December 2011 – 2012)
