= Ambuno Achille =

Cameroonian footballer

Personal information
- Full name: Ambuno Achille
- Date of birth: 2 November 1987 (age 38)
- Place of birth: Cameroon
- Height: 1.91 m (6 ft 3 in)
- Position: Forward

Team information
- Current team: without club
- Number: 9

Youth career
- 2006–2009: Kadji Sports Academy
- 2012: Rahian Kermanshah

Senior career*
Years	Team	Apps	(Gls)
2010–2011	Nassaji	12	(1)
2011–2012	Shirin Faraz	26	(8)
2012–2014	Rahian Kermanshah	43	(15)
2014–2015	Saba Qom	13	(2)
Total		93	(27)

International career^{‡}
2010–2013	Cameroon U23	4	(1)
- * Club domestic league appearances and goals as of 15 May 2015 ‡ National team caps and goals as of 22 November 2013

Ambuno Achille (born 2 November 1987) is a Cameroonian footballer who currently plays for Saba Qom in Iran Pro League.

== Club career ==
=== Rahian Kermanshah ===
Achille was part of Rahian Kermanshah's youth academy until 2012, when he was promoted to the first team squad by coach Javad Zarincheh. He played twenty games and scored five goals in his debut season for Rahian Kermanshah. At the next season, he was part of starting XI of Rahian Kermanshah, where he played twenty one games and scored ten goals.

=== Saba Qom ===
On 25 June 2014, Achille was signed by Saba Qom. He signed a contract until 2017 with the club and was given number 9 shirt. He played his first game for Saba in a 2–1 match against Zob Ahan where he scored the winning goal.

== Career statistics ==
As of 15 May 2015.

Club performance			League		Cup		Continental		Total	
Season	Club	League	Apps	Goals	Apps	Goals	Apps	Goals	Apps	Goals
Iran			League		Hazfi Cup		Asia		Total	
2012–13	Rahian; Kermanshah	Division 1	23	8	–	–	–	–	20	5
2013–14	Rahian; Kermanshah	Division 1	20	7	0	0	–	–	21	10
2014–15	Saba Qom	Pro League	13	2	0	0	–	–	13	2
Career total			56	17	1	0	0	0	57	17
