= Salman Bahrani =

Iranian Football Forward

Personal information
- Full name: Salman Bahrani
- Date of birth: September 29, 1989 (age 37)
- Place of birth: Bushehr, Iran
- Height: 1.82 m (6 ft 0 in)
- Position: Defensive midfielder

Team information
- Current team: Mes Rafsanjan
- Number: 66

Senior career*
Years	Team	Apps	(Gls)
2014–2016	Iranjavan	37	(3)
2016–2018	Esteghlal Khuzestan	19	(2)
2018	Fajr Sepasi	16	(2)
2018–	Mes Rafsanjan	10	(0)
2019-2020	Shahin Bushehr F.C.	24	(0)
2020-2021	Sanat Mes Kerman F.C.	12	(1)
2021	Khooshe Talaei Saveh F.C.		
- * Club domestic league appearances and goals as of 25 April 2017

Salman Bahrani is an Iranian football forward who currently plays for Iranian football club Mes Rafsanjan in the Azadegan League.
