= Davoud Mahabadi =

Iranian footballer and manager

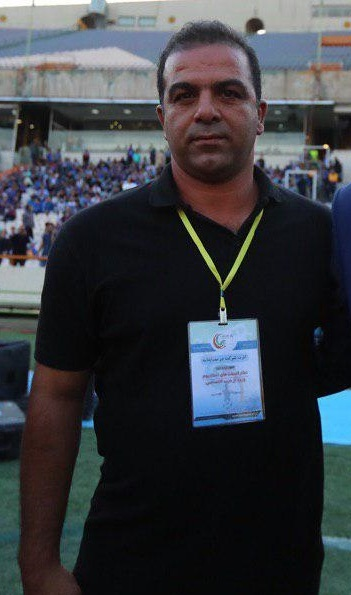

Personal information
- Full name: Davoud Mahabadi
- Date of birth: 21 August 1973 (age 53)
- Place of birth: Tehran, Iran
- Position: Defender

Senior career*
Years	Team	Apps	(Gls)
1995–1996	Esteghlal	12	(0)
1996–2002	Zob Ahan	80	(5)
2002–2004	Esteghlal Ahvaz	32	(0)
2004–2007	Rah Ahan	42	(0)

International career
1998	Iran	1	(0)

Managerial career
- 2008–2009: Rah Ahan
- 2009: Tarbiat Yazd
- 2009–2010: Moghavemat Sepasi
- 2010–2011: Payam Khorasan
- 2011–2012: Gohar Zagros
- 2012–2013: Mes Sarcheshmeh
- 2013–2014: Esteghlal Ahvaz
- 2014–2015: Pas Hamedan
- 2016–2017: Aluminium Arak
- 2017: New Bargh Fars
- 2017–2018: Nassaji Mazandaran
- 2018: Siah Jamegan
- 2018: Shahrdari Mahshahr
- 2018–2020: Fajr Sepasi
- 2020: Iran U20
- 2020–21: Shahin Bushehr
- 2021: Kooshe Talaei Saveh
- 2021–2022: Esteghlal Khuzestan
- 2024-: Mes Shahr-e Babak F.C.(assistant)
- * Club domestic league appearances and goals

Davoud Mahabadi (Persian: داوود مهابادی, born 21 August 1973 in Tehran) is an Iranian football manager and former player.

== Honours ==
=== Manager ===
Gahar Zagros

- Azadegan League (1): 2011–12
