= Yadavaran Shalamcheh F.C. =

Iranian football club

Yadavaran Shalamcheh
- Full name: Yadavaran Shalamcheh Football Club
- Founded: 2012
- Ground: Jahan Ara Stadium; Khorramshahr; Iran
- Manager: Hasan Salemi
- League: 3rd Division
- 2012–13: Azadegan League, 14th (Relegated)

Yadavaran Shalamcheh Football Club is an Iranian football club based in Khorramshahr, Iran. They currently compete in the Iran Football's 3rd Division. They competed last season in Azadegan League but was soon relegated to the 2nd Division. They relegation was increased to 3rd Division due to match-fixing scandal.

== History ==
In September 2012, they bought the license of Sanati Kaveh football club in order to participate in 2012–13 Azadegan League.

== Season-by-Season ==
The table below shows the achievements of the club in various competitions.

Season	League	Position	Hazfi Cup	Notes
2012–13	Azadegan League	14th		Relegated

== See also ==
- Hazfi Cup
- Sanati Kaveh
