= Ahmad Sanjari =

Iranian footballer

Personal information
- Full name: Ahmad Sanjari
- Date of birth: 23 September 1953 (age 73)
- Place of birth: Karaj, Iran
- Position: Defender

Senior career*
Years	Team	Apps	(Gls)
1978	Mohammedan S.C.		
1979–1988	Homa		

International career
1978–1984	Iran	16	(0)

Managerial career
- 2005–2007: Mes Sarcheshmeh (Youth)
- 2007–2009: Mes Sarcheshmeh (Assistant)
- 2009–2011: Mes Sarcheshmeh
- 2012–2013: Iranjavaan
- 2013: Rahian Kermanshah
- 2015: Baadraan Tehran
- * Club domestic league appearances and goals

Ahmad Sanjari (Persian: احمد سنجری; born 23 September 1953 in Tehran) is a retired Iranian professional footballer who represented Iran in the 1978 FIFA World Cup. He first played for Indian club Mohammedan S.C. during 1978 at the age of 18. He was the head coach of Mes Sarcheshmeh from 2009 to 2011 and promoted to the team to the Iran Pro League in 2011 but was fired after four weeks because of poor results in premier league.

== Personal life ==
Sanjari was born in 1960 in Karaj and came to India to study. He was a student of Aligarh Muslim University during the late 1970s.

== Club career ==
Sanjari began his professional career with Calcutta-giant Mohammedan Sporting in 1978. He played only a single season for the club in the Calcutta Football League and achieved local popularity.

After his stint with Mohammedan, Sanjari moved to Iran and played for Tehran Province League side Homa F.C. from 1979 to 1988.

== International career ==
Sanjari was a regular member of the Iran national football team from 1978 to 1984. He has also represented Iran in the 1984 AFC Asian Cup.

== Managerial career ==
Sanjari began his coaching career in India with National Football League side Dempo SC. He took charge of the Goan-side in 2000 when Dempo relegated to the 2nd division. He kept faith in youngsters and was the man who transformed Samir Naik from a striker to one of India's most enterprising full-back.

He became the assistant manager and later head-coach of Iranian side Mes Sarcheshmeh from 2007 to 2011. From 2012 to 2013, he was on charge of F.C. Iranjavan Bushehr and in 2013 of Rahian Kermanshah F.C.

== Managerial statistics ==
As of 24 August 2011

Team	From	To	Record						
Team	From	To	G	W	D	L	GF	GA	+/-
M. Sarcheshmeh	September 2009	August 2011	57	23	18	16	70	42	+28
Total			57	23	18	16	70	42	+28

== See also ==
- Iran men's international footballers
- List of 1984 AFC Asian Cup players
- Homa F.C. players
