= 2009–10 Foolad F.C. season =

Foolad F.C.
2009–10 season
- Chairman: Seifollah Dehkordi
- Manager: Majid Jalali
- Iran Pro League: 10th
- Hazfi Cup: -
- Top goalscorer: League: All: Gholamreza Rezaei

== First-team squad ==
Note: Flags indicate national team as defined under FIFA eligibility rules; some limited exceptions apply. Players may hold more than one non-FIFA nationality.

No.	Pos.	Nation	Player
1	GK	IRN	Khaled Shahetavi
2	MF	GEO	Jaba Mujiri
3	MF	IRN	Mehdi Chamanara
4	MF	IRN	Ayub Vali
5	DF	IRN	Jalal Kameli Mofrad
6	MF	IRQ	Abdul-Wahab Abu Al-Hail
7	MF	IRN	Saeed Ramezani
8	MF	IRN	Gholamreza Rezaei
9	FW	IRN	Sajjad Feizollahi
10	MF	IRN	Hojat Zadmahmoud
11	MF	IRN	Bakhtiar Rahmani
12	MF	IRN	Amir Afravi
13	MF	IRN	Javad Shirzad
14	MF	IRN	Karim Shaverdi
15	DF	IRN	Mohannad Alavi

No.	Pos.	Nation	Player
16	FW	IRN	Arash Afshin
18	FW	URU	Cristian Yeladian
19	MF	BIH	Mladen Bartolović
20	DF	IRN	Nader Ahmadi
21	MF	IRN	Amir Khodamoradi
22	GK	IRN	Abolfazl Bahadorani
23	FW	IRN	Siamak Sarlak
24	MF	IRN	Mehrdad Jamaati
25	MF	IRN	Payam Hajinajaf
27	DF	IRN	Masoud Armoun
28	FW	IRN	Lefteh Hamidi
30	GK	IRN	Hossein Ashena
33	GK	IRN	Saeed Moradi
40	MF	IRN	Ali Hamoudi

== Transfers ==
In: Note: Flags indicate national team as defined under FIFA eligibility rules; some limited exceptions apply. Players may hold more than one non-FIFA nationality.

No.	Pos.	Nation	Player
30	GK	IRN	Hossein Ashena (from Rah Ahan)
40	DF	IRN	Ali Hamoudi (from Mes Kerman)
13	MF	IRN	Javad Shirzad (from PAS Hamedan)
15	DF	IRN	Mohammad Alavi (from Persepolis)
2	DF	GEO	Jaba Mujiri (from FC Sioni Bolnisi)
19	MF	BIH	Mladen Bartolović (from Hajduk Split)
6	MF	IRQ	Abdul-Wahab Abu Al-Hail (from Sepahan)
--	FW	URU	Cristian Yeladian (from Juventud de Las Piedras)
8	MF	IRN	Gholamreza Rezaei (from Emirates Club)

Out: Note: Flags indicate national team as defined under FIFA eligibility rules; some limited exceptions apply. Players may hold more than one non-FIFA nationality.

No.	Pos.	Nation	Player
16	MF	IRN	Ali Obeidavi (to Foolad Novin F.C.)
18	FW	IRN	Mehdi Chajouei (to Foolad Novin F.C.)
32	GK	IRN	Amin Jahanmehr (to Foolad Novin F.C.)
21	DF	IRN	Amin Hejazi (to Foolad Novin F.C.)
3	DF	IRN	Ali Mardan Khalteh (to Foolad Novin F.C.)
23	DF	IRN	Reza Mardani (to Foolad Novin F.C.)
12	MF	IRN	Saeed Moradi (to Foolad Novin F.C.)
—	DF	IRN	Mohsen Rahimi (to Nassaji Mazandaran F.C.)
32	FW	IRN	Hojat Chaharmahali (to Sanat Naft Abadan F.C.)
--	FW	BRA	Sandro Gaúcho (to Sanat Naft Abadan F.C.)
27	MF	IRN	Mohammed Ghazi (to Zob Ahan)
11	MF	IRN	Esmaeil Sharifat (to Esteghlal Ahvaz)
14	MF	IRN	Ahmad Alenemeh (to Sepahan)
16	MF	IRN	Pejman Jamshidi (to Aboomoslem)
19	FW	BRA	Luciano Valente (to Shahin Bushehr)
33	GK	POR	Carlos Fernandes (to Rio Ave)
--	FW	IRN	Reza Taheri (to Damash Gilan)

== Matches ==
August 6, 2009	Rah Ahan F.C.	2–1	Foolad F.C.	Tehran, Iran
	Heydari 55'; Kamyabi 84'		Shirzad 54'	Stadium: Rah Ahan Stadium; Referee: Bakhshizadeh

August 14, 2009	Foolad F.C.	1–1	Paykan F.C.	Ahvaz, Khūzestān, Iran
	Mujiri 31'		Lotfi 73'	Stadium: Takhti Stadium; Referee: Jabari

August 21, 2009	Esteghlal F.C.	1–0	Foolad F.C.	Tehran, Tehran province, Iran
	Enayati 48'			Stadium: Azadi Stadium; Referee: Faghani

August 28, 2009	Foolad F.C.	1–1	Moghavemat Sepasi F.C.	Ahvaz, Khūzestān, Iran
	Shirzad 45'		Motevaselzadeh 44'	Stadium: Takhti Stadium; Referee: Daneshmehr

September 7, 2009	Foolad F.C.	0–0	Sepahan F.C.	Ahvaz, Khūzestān, Iran
				Stadium: Takhti Stadium; Referee: Mozafari

September 13, 2009	Malavan F.C.	1–0	Foolad F.C.	Bandar-e Anzali, Gilan, Iran
	Alves 70'			Stadium: Tahkti Stadium; Referee: Rafiei

September 20, 2009	Foolad F.C.	1–1	Saipa F.C.	Ahvaz, Khūzestān, Iran
	Alavi 55'		Ansarifard 12'	Stadium: Takhti Stadium; Referee: Nikozadeh

September 25, 2009	Tractor Sazi F.C.	1–0	Foolad F.C.	Tabriz, East Azarbaijan, Iran
	Ebrahimi 55'			Stadium: Yadegar-e Emam Stadium; Referee: Haghverdi

October 2, 2009	Foolad F.C.	0–1	Steel Azin F.C.	Ahvaz, Khūzestān, Iran
			Norouzi 40'	Stadium: Takhti Stadium; Referee: Salehi

October 2, 2009	F.C. Aboomoslem	1–1	Foolad F.C.	Mashhad, Razavi Khorasan, Iran
	Rajabzadeh 16'		Ramezani 45+1'	Stadium: Samen Stadium; Referee: Mehrpisheh

October 10, 2009	Foolad F.C.	0–0	Persepolis F.C.	Ahvaz, Khūzestān, Iran
				Stadium: Takhti Stadium; Referee: Ghahremani

October 16, 2009	Mes Kerman F.C.	2–0	Foolad F.C.	Kerman, Kermān Province, Iran
			Luciano 36'; Rajabzadeh 87'	Stadium: Shahid Bahonar Stadium; Referee: Jabari

October 23, 2009	Foolad F.C.	1–1	Esteghlal Ahvaz F.C.	Ahvaz, Khūzestān, Iran
	Rahmani 37'		Magholi 92'	Stadium: Takhti Stadium; Referee: Torki

October 27, 2009	Pas Hamedan F.C.	3–1	Foolad F.C.	Hamedan, Hamadān Province, Iran
	Shahalidoost 29'; Vali 42' o.g. Asghari 72'		Khodamoradi 86'	Stadium: Ghods Stadium; Referee: Afsharian

November 1, 2009	Foolad F.C.	2–1	Saba Qom F.C.	Ahvaz, Khūzestān, Iran
	Ahmadi 47'; Feizollahi 48'		Fazli 45'	Stadium: Takhti Stadium; Referee: Saedi

November 7, 2009	Zob Ahan F.C.	1–1	Foolad F.C.	Esfahan, Isfahan province, Iran
	Igor 78'			Stadium: Foolad Shahr Stadium; Referee: Rahbar Faam

November 27, 2009	Foolad F.C.	0–0	Shahin Bushehr F.C.	Ahvaz, Khūzestān, Iran
				Stadium: Takhti Stadium; Referee: Jahanbazi

December 4, 2009	Foolad F.C.	4–0	Rah Ahan F.C.	Ahvaz, Khūzestān, Iran
	Sarlak 10' 48'; Rezaei 47' 77'			Stadium: Takhti Stadium; Referee: Haghverdi

December 11, 2009	Paykan F.C.	1–1	Foolad F.C.	Qazvin, Qazvīn Province, Iran
	Luiz Carlos 25'		Ramezani 95'	Stadium: Shahid Rajaei Stadium; Referee: Bakhshizadeh

December 17, 2009	Foolad F.C.	1–1	Esteghlal F.C.	Ahvaz, Khūzestān, Iran
	Bartolovic 55'		Seyed Salehi 94'	Stadium: Takhti Stadium; Referee: Ghahremani

December 24, 2009	Moghavemat Sepasi F.C.	0–1	Foolad F.C.	Shiraz, Fars, Iran
			Afshin 68'	Stadium: Hafezieh Stadium; Referee: Mozafarizadeh

January 1, 2010	Sepahan F.C.	1–1	Foolad F.C.	Esfahan, Isfahan province, Iran
	Hosseini 31'		Sarlak 34'	Stadium: Foolad Shahr Stadium; Referee: Mehrpisheh

January 15, 2010	Foolad F.C.	0–0	Malavan F.C.	Ahvaz, Khūzestān, Iran
				Stadium: Takhti Stadium; Referee: Faghani

January 22, 2010	Saipa F.C.	1–2	Foolad F.C.	Karaj, Tehran province, Iran
	Ebrahimi 92'		Rezaei 38' 48'	Stadium: Enghelab Stadium; Referee: Daneshmehr

January 28, 2010	Foolad F.C.	1–1	Tractor Sazi F.C.	Ahvaz, Khūzestān, Iran
	Ahmadi 30'		Mohebi 14'	Stadium: Takhti Stadium; Referee: Ameri

February 2, 2010	Steel Azin F.C.	2–3	Foolad F.C.	Tehran, Tehran province, Iran
	Mohammadi 39'; Norouzi 53'		Rahmani 33'; Ramezani 45'; Rezaei 82'	Stadium: Tahkti Stadium; Referee: Bakhshizadeh

February 19, 2010	Foolad F.C.	1–0	F.C. Aboomoslem	Ahvaz, Khūzestān, Iran
	Ramezani 57'			Stadium: Takhti Stadium; Referee: Mozafarizadeh

March 5, 2010	Persepolis F.C.	1–0	Foolad F.C.	Tehran, Tehran province, Iran
	Khalili 77'			Stadium: Azadi Stadium; Referee: Rafiei

March 15, 2010	Foolad F.C.	0–4	Mes Kerman F.C.	Ahvaz, Khūzestān, Iran
			Ashoubi 25'; Samereh 60' 65'; Zaltron 83'	Stadium: Takhti Stadium; Referee: Torki

April 4, 2010	Esteghlal Ahvaz F.C.	0–1	Foolad F.C.	Ahvaz, Khūzestān, Iran
			Feizollahi 29'	Stadium: Tahkti Stadium; Referee: Jahanbazi

April 16, 2010	Foolad F.C.	3–2	Pas Hamedan F.C.	Ahvaz, Khūzestān, Iran
	Shirzad 45+2'; Ramezani 61'; Sarlak 81'		Kameli Mofrad 3'o.g. Yedigaryan 20'	Stadium: Tahkti Stadium; Referee: Moradi

May 2, 2010	Saba Qom F.C.	1–1	Foolad F.C.	Qom, Qom province, Iran
	Haghi 91'		Rahmani 03'	Stadium: Yadegar-e Emam Stadium; Referee: Mehrpisheh

May 6, 2010	Foolad F.C.	1–1	Zob Ahan F.C.	Ahvaz, Khūzestān, Iran
	Rezaei 32'		Talebi 79'	Stadium: Tahkti Stadium; Referee: Faghani

May 18, 2010	Shahin Bushehr F.C.	0–1	Foolad F.C.	Bushehr, Bushehr, Iran
			Gholamreza Rezaei 65'	Stadium: Shahid Beheshti Stadium

== Final standings ==
Pos	Team	Pld	W	D	L	GF	GA	GD	Pts
8	Saipa	34	12	10	12	48	53	−5	46
9	Mes	34	11	9	14	55	56	−1	42
10	Foolad	34	9	15	10	31	34	−3	42
11	Paykan	34	9	14	11	40	44	−4	41
12	Malavan	34	10	11	13	31	47	−16	41

Updated to match(es) played on 01 SEP 2018. Source: IPL Stats, Soccerway
Rules for classification: 1) Points; 2) Goal difference; 3) Goals scored.

== Goalscorers ==
7 Goals

- (Iran) Gholamreza Rezaei

5 Goals

- (Iran) Saeed Ramezani

4 Goals

- (Iran) Siamak Sarlak

3 Goals

- (Iran) Javad Shirzad
- (Iran) Bakhtiar Rahmani

2 Goals

- (Iran) Sajjad Feizollahi
- (Iran) Nader Ahmadi

1 Goal

- (Iran) Ayub Vali
- (Georgia (country)) Jaba Mujiri
- (Iran) Amir Khodamoradi
- (Iran) Jalal Kameli Mofrad
- (Bosnia and Herzegovina) Mladen Bartolovic
- (Iran) Mohammad Alavi
- (Iran) Arash Afshin
