= 2010–11 Foolad F.C. season =

Foolad F.C.
2010–11 season
- Chairman: (Iran) Seifollah Dehkordi
- Manager: (Iran) Majid Jalali
- Hazfi Cup: -

The 2010–11 Foolad F.C. season culminated in the Iranian association football team Foolad Khuzestan Football Club's 3rd consecutive season in the Persian Gulf Pro League, the top flight of Iranian football.

== Results ==
| Pos | Team | Pld | W | D | L | GF | GA | GD | Pts | Qualification or relegation |
|---|---|---|---|---|---|---|---|---|---|---|
| 4 | Persepolis | 34 | 17 | 7 | 10 | 50 | 36 | +14 | 58 | Qualification for 2012 AFC Champions League group stage (Note: Persepolis qualified to AFC Champions League group stage directly by winning the Hazfi Cup) |
| 5 | Tractor Sazi | 34 | 15 | 12 | 7 | 42 | 29 | +13 | 57 | |
| 6 | Foolad | 34 | 14 | 12 | 8 | 58 | 36 | +22 | 54 | |
| 7 | Mes | 34 | 13 | 13 | 8 | 41 | 30 | +11 | 52 | |
| 8 | Malavan | 34 | 13 | 9 | 12 | 33 | 32 | +1 | 48 | |

Updated to match(es) played on 1 SEP 2018. Source: IPL Stats, Soccerway
Rules for classification: 1) Points; 2) Goal difference; 3) Goals scored.

== Squad ==
Note: Flags indicate national team as defined under FIFA eligibility rules; some limited exceptions apply. Players may hold more than one non-FIFA nationality.

| No. | Pos. | Nation | Player |
|---|---|---|---|
| 1 | GK | IRN | Khaled Shahetavi |
| 2 | MF | GEO | Jaba Mujiri |
| 3 | MF | IRN | Mehdi Chamanara |
| 4 | DF | IRN | Ayub Vali |
| 5 | DF | IRN | Jalal Kameli Mofrad |
| 6 | DF | IRN | Meysam Khosravi |
| 7 | MF | IRN | Saeed Ramezani |
| 8 | MF | IRN | Reza Magholi |
| 10 | FW | IRN | Reza Norouzi |
| 11 | MF | IRN | Bakhtiar Rahmani |
| 13 | MF | BRA | Andrezinho |
| 14 | MF | IRN | Karim Shaverdi |

| No. | Pos. | Nation | Player |
|---|---|---|---|
| 15 | FW | MLI | Bakary Diakité |
| 16 | FW | IRN | Arash Afshin |
| 17 | FW | IRN | Mehdi Momeni |
| 18 | GK | IRN | Misagh Memarzadeh |
| 20 | DF | IRN | Omid Khouraj |
| 21 | FW | IRN | Saeed Ghadami |
| 22 | GK | IRN | Alireza Salimi |
| 23 | MF | IRN | Siamak Sarlak |
| 24 | MF | IRN | Mehrdad Jamaati |
| 28 | MF | IRN | Reza Ghiali |
| 29 | FW | IRN | Kaveh Rezaei |
| 40 | MF | IRN | Ali Hamoudi |

== Transfers ==
In: Note: Flags indicate national team as defined under FIFA eligibility rules; some limited exceptions apply. Players may hold more than one non-FIFA nationality.

| No. | Pos. | Nation | Player |
|---|---|---|---|
| 15 | FW | MLI | Bakary Diakité (from (Germany) FSV Frankfurt) |
| 1 | GK | IRN | Misagh Memarzadeh (from Persepolis) |
| — | DF | IRN | Omid Khouraj (from Pas Hamedan) |
| — | MF | IRN | Reza Magholi (from Esteghlal Ahvaz) |
| — | MF | IRN | Reza Norouzi (from Steel Azin) |
| — | MF | IRN | Meysam Khosravi (from Steel Azin) |
| — | FW | IRN | Ruhollah Bigdeli (from Mes) |
| — | MF | BRA | Andrezinho (from (Serbia) FK Borac Čačak) |

Out: Note: Flags indicate national team as defined under FIFA eligibility rules; some limited exceptions apply. Players may hold more than one non-FIFA nationality.

| No. | Pos. | Nation | Player |
|---|---|---|---|
| 9 | FW | IRN | Sajjad Feizollahi (Released, to Naft Tehran) |
| 12 | MF | IRN | Amir Afravi (Released) |
| 21 | MF | IRN | Amir Khodamoradi (Released) |
| 27 | DF | IRN | Masoud Armoun (Released) |
| 19 | MF | BIH | Mladen Bartolović (Released, to (Croatia) HNK Cibalia) |
| 33 | GK | IRN | Saeed Moradi (Released) |
| 22 | GK | IRN | Abolfazl Bahadorani (Released) |
| 25 | MF | IRN | Payam Hajinajaf (Released) |
| 10 | MF | IRN | Hojat Zadmahmoud (Released) |
| 28 | FW | IRN | Lefteh Hamidi (Released) |
| 15 | DF | IRN | Mohammad Alavi (Released) |
| 20 | DF | IRN | Nader Ahmadi (to Pas Hamedan) |
| 6 | MF | IRQ | Abdul-Wahab Abu Al-Hail (Released) |
| 13 | DF | IRN | Javad Shirzad (to Esteghlal) |
| 8 | FW | IRN | Gholamreza Rezaei (to Persepolis) |
| 18 | FW | URU | Cristian Yeladian (Released, to (Brazil) Juventude) |

== Matches ==
| July 26, 2010 | Foolad F.C. | 0-1 | Steel Azin F.C. | Ahvaz, Khūzestān, Iran |
| | | | Zeneyedpour 88' | Stadium: Takhti Stadium; Referee: Afsharian |

| July 31, 2010 | Esteghlal F.C. | 1-2 | Foolad F.C. | Tehran, Tehran Province, Iran |
| | Meydavoodi 10' | | Norouzi 63' 68' | Stadium: Azadi Stadium; Referee: Jahanbazi |

| August 6, 2010 | Foolad F.C. | 1-1 | Sepahan F.C. | Ahvaz, Khūzestān, Iran |
| | Rahmani 76' | | Aghily 32' | Stadium: Takhti Stadium; Referee: Faghani |

| August 13, 2010 | Naft Tehran F.C. | 0-3 | Foolad F.C. | Tehran, Tehran Province, Iran |
| | | | Norouzi 75' 79'; Sarlak 78' | Stadium: Aliaf Stadium; Referee: Vahedi |

| August 17, 2010 | Foolad F.C. | 0-0 | Saba Qom F.C. | Ahvaz, Khūzestān, Iran |
| | | | | Stadium: Takhti Stadium; Referee: Bakhshizadeh |

| August 22, 2010 | Mes Kerman F.C. | 1-0 | Foolad F.C. | Kerman, Kermān Province, Iran |
| | Mansouri 4' | | | Stadium: Shahid Bahonar Stadium |

| August 27, 2010 | Foolad F.C. | 1-1 | Persepolis F.C. | Ahvaz, Khūzestān, Iran |
| | Khouraj 45+3' | | Nouri 36' | Stadium: Takhti Stadium; Referee: Ghahremani |

| September 10, 2010 | Sanat Naft Abadan F.C. | 2-2 | Foolad F.C. | Abadan, Khūzestān, Iran |
| | Sharifinasab 20'; Mombeini 30' | | Norouzi 54' 65' | Stadium: Takhti Stadium; Referee: Torki |

| September 17, 2010 | Foolad F.C. | 6-0 | Paykan F.C. | Ahvaz, Khūzestān, Iran |
| | | | | Stadium: Takhti Stadium |

| October 15, 2010 | Rah Ahan F.C. | 1-0 | Foolad F.C. | Tehran, Iran |
| | | | | Stadium: Rah Ahan Stadium |

| October 22, 2010 | Foolad F.C. | 1-1 | Tractor Sazi F.C. | Ahvaz, Khūzestān, Iran |
| | | | | Stadium: Takhti Stadium |

| October 26, 2010 | Saipa F.C. | 5-5 | Foolad F.C. | Karaj, Tehran Province, Iran |
| | | | | Stadium: Enghelab Stadium |

| October 31, 2010 | Foolad F.C. | 1-0 | Shahin Bushehr F.C. | Ahvaz, Khūzestān, Iran |
| | | | | Stadium: Takhti Stadium |

| November 5, 2010 | Foolad F.C. | 1-0 | Malavan F.C. | Ahvaz, Khūzestān, Iran |
| | | | | Stadium: Takhti Stadium |

| November 9, 2010 | Foolad F.C. | 2-2 | Zob Ahan F.C. | Ahvaz, Khūzestān, Iran |
| | | | | Stadium: Tahkti Stadium |

| November 28, 2010 | Pas Hamedan F.C. | 0-0 | Foolad F.C. | Hamedan, Hamadān Province, Iran |
| | | | | Stadium: Ghods Stadium |

| December 3, 2010 | Shahrdari Tabriz F.C. | 0-2 | Foolad F.C. | Tabriz, East Azarbaijan, Iran |
| | | | | Stadium: Bagh Shomal Stadium |

| December 12, 2010 | Steel Azin F.C. | 2-1 | Foolad F.C. | Tehran, Tehran Province, Iran |
| | | | | Stadium: Tahkti Stadium |

| December 19, 2010 | Foolad F.C. | 4-1 | Esteghlal F.C. | Ahvaz, Khūzestān, Iran |
| | | | | Stadium: Takhti Stadium |

| December 24, 2010 | Sepahan F.C. | 3-2 | Foolad F.C. | Esfahan, Isfahan Province, Iran |
| | | | | Stadium: Foolad Shahr Stadium |

| January 31, 2011 | Foolad F.C. | 2-1 | Naft Tehran F.C. | Ahvaz, Khūzestān, Iran |
| | | | | Stadium: Takhti Stadium |

| February 6, 2011 | Saba Qom F.C. | 1-1 | Foolad F.C. | Qom, Qom Province, Iran |
| | | | | Stadium: Yadegar-e Emam Stadium |

| February 15, 2011 | Foolad F.C. | 1-0 | Mes Kerman F.C. | Ahvaz, Khūzestān, Iran |
| | | | | Stadium: Takhti Stadium |

| February 20, 2011 | Persepolis F.C. | 3-1 | Foolad F.C. | Tehran, Tehran Province, Iran |
| | | | | Stadium: Azadi Stadium |

| February 25, 2011 | Foolad F.C. | 4-1 | Sanat Naft Abadan F.C. | Ahvaz, Khūzestān, Iran |
| | | | | Stadium: Takhti Stadium |

| March 4, 2011 | Paykan F.C. | 0-2 | Foolad F.C. | Qazvin, Qazvīn Province, Iran |
| | | | | Stadium: Shahid Rajaei Stadium |

| March 11, 2011 | Foolad F.C. | 0-0 | Rah Ahan F.C. | Ahvaz, Khūzestān, Iran |
| | | | | Stadium: Takhti Stadium |

| March 18, 2011 | Tractor Sazi F.C. | 1-1 | Foolad F.C. | Tabriz, East Azarbaijan, Iran |
| | | | | Stadium: Yadegar-e Emam Stadium |

| April 8, 2011 | Foolad F.C. | 2-1 | Saipa F.C. | Ahvaz, Khūzestān, Iran |
| | | | | Stadium: Takhti Stadium |

| April 15, 2010 | Shahin Bushehr F.C. | 2-0 | Foolad F.C. | Bushehr, Bushehr, Iran |
| | | | | Stadium: Shahid Beheshti Stadium |

| April 22, 2011 | Malavan F.C. | 1-0 | Foolad F.C. | Bandar-e Anzali, Gilan, Iran |
| | | | | Stadium: Tahkti Stadium |

== See also ==
- Iran Premier League Statistics
- Persian League
