= List of Iranian football transfers winter 2011–12 =

This is a list of Iranian football transfers for the 2011–12 winter transfer window. Only moves featuring at least one Iran Pro League or Azadegan League club are listed.

== Iran Pro League ==
=== Damash Gilan ===
In: Note: Flags indicate national team as defined under FIFA eligibility rules; some limited exceptions apply. Players may hold more than one non-FIFA nationality.

No.	Pos.	Nation	Player
17	DF	IRN	Hossein Koushki (from Free agent)

Out: Note: Flags indicate national team as defined under FIFA eligibility rules; some limited exceptions apply. Players may hold more than one non-FIFA nationality.

No.	Pos.	Nation	Player
2	DF	IRN	Mehdi Mahdavikia (to Persepolis)
17	MF	IRN	Siamak Sarlak (to Tractor Sazi)

=== Esteghlal ===
In: Note: Flags indicate national team as defined under FIFA eligibility rules; some limited exceptions apply. Players may hold more than one non-FIFA nationality.

No.	Pos.	Nation	Player
20	FW	FRA	Goran Jerković (from (Lithuania) FK Tauras)
12	DF	TRI	Jlloyd Samuel (from (England) Bolton Wanderers)
17	MF	CMR	Jacques Elong Elong (from (Slovakia) Dunajská Streda)
34	MF	IRN	Hossein Alavi (from Tarbiat Yazd)
39	GK	IRN	Mehdi Eslami (from Pas Hamedan)

Out: Note: Flags indicate national team as defined under FIFA eligibility rules; some limited exceptions apply. Players may hold more than one non-FIFA nationality.

No.	Pos.	Nation	Player
25	FW	IRN	Mojtaba Mahboub Mojaz (on loan to Mes Sarcheshmeh)
7	FW	IRN	Farhad Majidi (on loan to (Qatar) Al-Gharafa)
15	MF	KUW	Waleed Ali (to Al Kuwait)
13	MF	IRQ	Karrar Jassim (to Shahin Bushehr)

=== Fajr Sepasi ===
In: Note: Flags indicate national team as defined under FIFA eligibility rules; some limited exceptions apply. Players may hold more than one non-FIFA nationality.

No.	Pos.	Nation	Player

Out: Note: Flags indicate national team as defined under FIFA eligibility rules; some limited exceptions apply. Players may hold more than one non-FIFA nationality.

No.	Pos.	Nation	Player
24	DF	IRN	Majid Heidari (to Saba Qom)

=== Foolad ===
In: Note: Flags indicate national team as defined under FIFA eligibility rules; some limited exceptions apply. Players may hold more than one non-FIFA nationality.

No.	Pos.	Nation	Player
34	MF	IRN	Amin Jahan Kohan (from Foolad U20)
35	MF	IRN	Ahmad Abdollah Zadeh (from Foolad U20)
36	DF	IRN	Yousef Vakiya (from Foolad U20)
37	MF	IRN	Taleb Reykani (from Sanat Naft)

Out: Note: Flags indicate national team as defined under FIFA eligibility rules; some limited exceptions apply. Players may hold more than one non-FIFA nationality.

No.	Pos.	Nation	Player

=== Malavan ===
In: Note: Flags indicate national team as defined under FIFA eligibility rules; some limited exceptions apply. Players may hold more than one non-FIFA nationality.

No.	Pos.	Nation	Player
3	DF	IRN	Mojtaba Ensafi (from Aboomoslem)
6	MF	IRN	Mohammad Hassan Rajabzadeh (from Sepahan)

Out: Note: Flags indicate national team as defined under FIFA eligibility rules; some limited exceptions apply. Players may hold more than one non-FIFA nationality.

No.	Pos.	Nation	Player
14	FW	MKD	Zoran Zlatkovski (Released)

=== Mes Kerman ===
In: Note: Flags indicate national team as defined under FIFA eligibility rules; some limited exceptions apply. Players may hold more than one non-FIFA nationality.

No.	Pos.	Nation	Player
28	FW	CRO	Aljoša Vojnović (from (Croatia) Slaven Belupo)
—	DF	IRN	Jalal Karami (from Gahar Zagros)
7	FW	IRN	Mohsen Khalili (from Free agent)
—	FW	IRN	Meghdad Ghobakhlou (from Shahrdari Yasuj)

Out: Note: Flags indicate national team as defined under FIFA eligibility rules; some limited exceptions apply. Players may hold more than one non-FIFA nationality.

No.	Pos.	Nation	Player
23	MF	IRN	Milad Fakhreddini (to Tractor Sazi)
14	MF	COL	Carlos Eduardo Salazar (to Deportivo Pereira)
32	DF	IRN	Bijan Koushki (Released)
20	FW	IRN	Mohsen Bayatinia (Released)
9	FW	SYR	George Mourad (to (Sweden) Syrianska FC)
27	FW	BRA	Leandrinho (to (United Arab Emirates) Al Nasr)
11	MF	IRN	Mehrdad Pooladi (to Persepolis)

=== Mes Sarcheshmeh ===
In: Note: Flags indicate national team as defined under FIFA eligibility rules; some limited exceptions apply. Players may hold more than one non-FIFA nationality.

No.	Pos.	Nation	Player
33	FW	IRN	Mojtaba Mahboub Mojaz (on loan from Esteghlal)
15	MF	NED	Collins John (from (Azerbaijan) Gabala)
—	DF	GEO	Georgi Krasovski (from (Armenia) Ulisses)
—	DF	UZB	Yaroslav Krushelnitskiy (from (Uzbekistan) Shurtan Guzar)
—	MF	IRN	Mohammad Mansouri (from Saipa)
—	DF	IRN	Majid Bajlan (from Rah Ahan)
—	DF	IRN	Ali Ebrahimi (from Persepolis U23)
—	FW	IRN	Ruhollah Bigdeli (from Foolad Natanz)
—	FW	IRN	Amir Rafaati (from Gol Gohar Sirjan)
—	MF	IRN	Mohammad Ghasemi Nejad (from Gahar Zagros)
—	FW	IRN	Saeid Hallafi (from Machine Sazi Tabriz)

Out: Note: Flags indicate national team as defined under FIFA eligibility rules; some limited exceptions apply. Players may hold more than one non-FIFA nationality.

No.	Pos.	Nation	Player
7	MF	IRN	Ali Molaei (to Saba Qom)
10	MF	IRN	Hamed Shirkhanlou (Released)
12	MF	MNE	Nenad Brnović (Released)
13	MF	IRN	Hossin Baghlani (to Nassaji Mazandaran)
14	MF	IRN	Hossein Ghanbari (Released)
22	GK	IRN	Asghar Karamollahi (to Shahrdari Yasuj)
26	DF	CRO	Ante Zurak (to Nassaji Mazandaran)
31	DF	IRN	Hossein Gohari (Released)

=== Naft Tehran ===
In: Note: Flags indicate national team as defined under FIFA eligibility rules; some limited exceptions apply. Players may hold more than one non-FIFA nationality.

No.	Pos.	Nation	Player
31	MF	IRN	Shahin Kheiri (from Free agent)
—	FW	POR	Marco Paixão (from (Scotland) Hamilton Academical F.C.)
—	MF	IRN	Mehdi Agha Mohammadi (from Aluminium Hormozgan)
—	MF	IRN	Rahim Mehdi Zahiri (from Shahrdari Bandar Abbas)

Out: Note: Flags indicate national team as defined under FIFA eligibility rules; some limited exceptions apply. Players may hold more than one non-FIFA nationality.

No.	Pos.	Nation	Player
36	FW	IRN	Sajjad Feizollahi (to Paykan)
14	MF	IRQ	Khaldoun Ibrahim (Released)
9	FW	IRN	Mohammad Reza Niknahal (to Pas Hamedan)

=== Persepolis ===
In: Note: Flags indicate national team as defined under FIFA eligibility rules; some limited exceptions apply. Players may hold more than one non-FIFA nationality.

No.	Pos.	Nation	Player
12	FW	LBY	Éamon Zayed (from (Republic of Ireland) Derry City)
32	MF	IRN	Saeid Ghadami (from Foolad)
19	DF	IRN	Mehdi Mahdavikia (from Damash Gilan)
38	GK	IRN	Hossein Hooshyar (from Shahrdari Yasuj)
35	DF	IRN	Hossein Kanaani (from Persepolis U23)
3	MF	IRN	Mehrdad Pooladi (on loan from Mes Kerman)
1	GK	BIH	Asmir Avdukić (on loan from (Bosnia and Herzegovina) FK Borac Banja)

Out: Note: Flags indicate national team as defined under FIFA eligibility rules; some limited exceptions apply. Players may hold more than one non-FIFA nationality.

No.	Pos.	Nation	Player
1	GK	IRN	Alireza Haghighi (to (Russia) Rubin Kazan)
16	MF	IRN	Mohammad Mansouri (to Zob Ahan)

=== Rah Ahan ===
In: Note: Flags indicate national team as defined under FIFA eligibility rules; some limited exceptions apply. Players may hold more than one non-FIFA nationality.

No.	Pos.	Nation	Player
—	MF	IRN	Mohammad Reza Mamani (from Free agent)
30	FW	IRN	Hossein Hejazipour (from Saba Qom)
15	DF	TUN	Mohamed Ali Gharzoul (from (Tunisia) Club Africain)

Out: Note: Flags indicate national team as defined under FIFA eligibility rules; some limited exceptions apply. Players may hold more than one non-FIFA nationality.

No.	Pos.	Nation	Player
99	DF	IRN	Majid Bajlan (to Mes Sarcheshmeh)
9	MF	IRN	Sattar Zare (to Shahin Bushehr)

=== Saba Qom ===
In: Note: Flags indicate national team as defined under FIFA eligibility rules; some limited exceptions apply. Players may hold more than one non-FIFA nationality.

No.	Pos.	Nation	Player
20	DF	IRN	Majid Heidari (from Fajr Sepasi)
7	MF	IRN	Ali Molaei (from Mes Sarcheshmeh)

Out: Note: Flags indicate national team as defined under FIFA eligibility rules; some limited exceptions apply. Players may hold more than one non-FIFA nationality.

No.	Pos.	Nation	Player
14	FW	IRN	Hossein Hejazipour (to Rah Ahan)

=== Saipa ===
In: Note: Flags indicate national team as defined under FIFA eligibility rules; some limited exceptions apply. Players may hold more than one non-FIFA nationality.

No.	Pos.	Nation	Player

Out: Note: Flags indicate national team as defined under FIFA eligibility rules; some limited exceptions apply. Players may hold more than one non-FIFA nationality.

No.	Pos.	Nation	Player
9	FW	IRN	Reza Khaleghifar (to Sanat Naft)
7	MF	IRN	Mohammad Mansouri (to Mes Sarcheshmeh)

=== Sanat Naft ===
In: Note: Flags indicate national team as defined under FIFA eligibility rules; some limited exceptions apply. Players may hold more than one non-FIFA nationality.

No.	Pos.	Nation	Player
25	MF	PLE	Imad Zatara (from (Sweden) Syrianska FC)
9	FW	IRN	Reza Khaleghifar (from Saipa)
40	GK	IRN	Abbas Mohammadi (from Tractor Sazi)

Out: Note: Flags indicate national team as defined under FIFA eligibility rules; some limited exceptions apply. Players may hold more than one non-FIFA nationality.

No.	Pos.	Nation	Player
9	FW	IRN	Hojat Chaharmahali (Released)
21	MF	IRN	Taleb Reykani (to Foolad)

=== Sepahan ===
In: Note: Flags indicate national team as defined under FIFA eligibility rules; some limited exceptions apply. Players may hold more than one non-FIFA nationality.

No.	Pos.	Nation	Player
19	FW	BRA	Bruno Correa (from (Armenia) Banants)
14	FW	ALB	Xhevahir Sukaj (from (Turkey) Gençlerbirliği)

Out: Note: Flags indicate national team as defined under FIFA eligibility rules; some limited exceptions apply. Players may hold more than one non-FIFA nationality.

No.	Pos.	Nation	Player
14	FW	IRN	Farzad Hatami (to Tractor Sazi)
3	MF	IRN	Mohammad Hassan Rajabzadeh (to Malavan)
29	FW	SRB	Milorad Janjuš (to Shahrdari Tabriz)

=== Shahin Bushehr ===
In: Note: Flags indicate national team as defined under FIFA eligibility rules; some limited exceptions apply. Players may hold more than one non-FIFA nationality.

No.	Pos.	Nation	Player
—	MF	IRN	Sattar Zare (from Rah Ahan)
13	MF	IRQ	Karrar Jassim (from Esteghlal)

Out: Note: Flags indicate national team as defined under FIFA eligibility rules; some limited exceptions apply. Players may hold more than one non-FIFA nationality.

No.	Pos.	Nation	Player
2	DF	IRN	Mohsen Hamidi (Released)
10	MF	IRN	Meysam Maniei (Released)

=== Shahrdari Tabriz ===
In: Note: Flags indicate national team as defined under FIFA eligibility rules; some limited exceptions apply. Players may hold more than one non-FIFA nationality.

No.	Pos.	Nation	Player
29	FW	SRB	Milorad Janjuš (from Sepahan)

Out: Note: Flags indicate national team as defined under FIFA eligibility rules; some limited exceptions apply. Players may hold more than one non-FIFA nationality.

No.	Pos.	Nation	Player
24	MF	SRB	Saša Krajnović (Released)
25	MF	SRB	Bojan Beljić (to (Serbia) Sloboda Užice)
10	FW	IRN	Ali Karimi (to Aluminium Hormozgan)

=== Tractor Sazi ===
In: Note: Flags indicate national team as defined under FIFA eligibility rules; some limited exceptions apply. Players may hold more than one non-FIFA nationality.

No.	Pos.	Nation	Player
23	MF	IRN	Ghasem Haddadifar (from Zob Ahan)
34	MF	IRN	Milad Fakhreddini (from Mes Kerman)
40	GK	IRN	Agil Etemadi (from (Netherlands) Groningen)
24	FW	IRN	Farzad Hatami (from Sepahan)
24	MF	IRN	Siamak Sarlak (from Damash Gilan)

Out: Note: Flags indicate national team as defined under FIFA eligibility rules; some limited exceptions apply. Players may hold more than one non-FIFA nationality.

No.	Pos.	Nation	Player
1	GK	IRN	Abbas Mohammadi (to Sanat Naft Abadan)
5	FW	GER	Shpejtim Arifi (to Aboomoslem)

=== Zob Ahan ===
In: Note: Flags indicate national team as defined under FIFA eligibility rules; some limited exceptions apply. Players may hold more than one non-FIFA nationality.

No.	Pos.	Nation	Player
14	MF	IRN	Mohammad Mansouri (from Persepolis)

Out: Note: Flags indicate national team as defined under FIFA eligibility rules; some limited exceptions apply. Players may hold more than one non-FIFA nationality.

No.	Pos.	Nation	Player
8	MF	IRN	Ghasem Haddadifar (to Tractor Sazi)
11	MF	IRQ	Hawar Mulla Mohammed (Released)

== Azadegan League ==
=== Aboomoslem ===
In: Note: Flags indicate national team as defined under FIFA eligibility rules; some limited exceptions apply. Players may hold more than one non-FIFA nationality.

No.	Pos.	Nation	Player
—	FW	GER	Shpejtim Arifi (from Tractor Sazi)
—	DF	IRN	Mehdi Hasheminasab (from Siah Jamegan)
—	MF	IRN	Hadi Asghari (from Gostaresh Foolad F.C.)
—	MF	IRN	Mehdi Hosseini (from Aboomoslem U-23)
—	GK	IRN	Omid Gholami (from Aboomoslem U-23)

Out: Note: Flags indicate national team as defined under FIFA eligibility rules; some limited exceptions apply. Players may hold more than one non-FIFA nationality.

No.	Pos.	Nation	Player
—	DF	IRN	Mojtaba Ensafi (to Malavan)

=== Aluminium Hormozgan ===
In: Note: Flags indicate national team as defined under FIFA eligibility rules; some limited exceptions apply. Players may hold more than one non-FIFA nationality.

No.	Pos.	Nation	Player
—	FW	IRN	Ali Karimi (from Shahrdari Tabriz)

Out: Note: Flags indicate national team as defined under FIFA eligibility rules; some limited exceptions apply. Players may hold more than one non-FIFA nationality.

No.	Pos.	Nation	Player
—	MF	IRN	Mehdi Agha Mohammadi (to Naft Tehran)

=== Bargh Shiraz ===
In: Note: Flags indicate national team as defined under FIFA eligibility rules; some limited exceptions apply. Players may hold more than one non-FIFA nationality.

No.	Pos.	Nation	Player

Out: Note: Flags indicate national team as defined under FIFA eligibility rules; some limited exceptions apply. Players may hold more than one non-FIFA nationality.

No.	Pos.	Nation	Player

=== Damash Tehran ===
In: Note: Flags indicate national team as defined under FIFA eligibility rules; some limited exceptions apply. Players may hold more than one non-FIFA nationality.

No.	Pos.	Nation	Player

Out: Note: Flags indicate national team as defined under FIFA eligibility rules; some limited exceptions apply. Players may hold more than one non-FIFA nationality.

No.	Pos.	Nation	Player

=== Esteghlal Jonub ===
In: Note: Flags indicate national team as defined under FIFA eligibility rules; some limited exceptions apply. Players may hold more than one non-FIFA nationality.

No.	Pos.	Nation	Player

Out: Note: Flags indicate national team as defined under FIFA eligibility rules; some limited exceptions apply. Players may hold more than one non-FIFA nationality.

No.	Pos.	Nation	Player

=== Etka ===
In: Note: Flags indicate national team as defined under FIFA eligibility rules; some limited exceptions apply. Players may hold more than one non-FIFA nationality.

No.	Pos.	Nation	Player

Out: Note: Flags indicate national team as defined under FIFA eligibility rules; some limited exceptions apply. Players may hold more than one non-FIFA nationality.

No.	Pos.	Nation	Player

=== Foolad Yazd ===
In: Note: Flags indicate national team as defined under FIFA eligibility rules; some limited exceptions apply. Players may hold more than one non-FIFA nationality.

No.	Pos.	Nation	Player

Out: Note: Flags indicate national team as defined under FIFA eligibility rules; some limited exceptions apply. Players may hold more than one non-FIFA nationality.

No.	Pos.	Nation	Player

=== Gahar Zagros ===
In: Note: Flags indicate national team as defined under FIFA eligibility rules; some limited exceptions apply. Players may hold more than one non-FIFA nationality.

No.	Pos.	Nation	Player

Out: Note: Flags indicate national team as defined under FIFA eligibility rules; some limited exceptions apply. Players may hold more than one non-FIFA nationality.

No.	Pos.	Nation	Player
—	DF	IRN	Jalal Karami (to Mes Kerman)
—	MF	IRN	Mohammad Ghasemi Nejad (to Mes Sarcheshmeh)

=== Gol Gohar ===
In: Note: Flags indicate national team as defined under FIFA eligibility rules; some limited exceptions apply. Players may hold more than one non-FIFA nationality.

No.	Pos.	Nation	Player

Out: Note: Flags indicate national team as defined under FIFA eligibility rules; some limited exceptions apply. Players may hold more than one non-FIFA nationality.

No.	Pos.	Nation	Player
—	FW	IRN	Amir Rafaati (to Mes Sarcheshmeh)

=== Gostaresh Foolad ===
In: Note: Flags indicate national team as defined under FIFA eligibility rules; some limited exceptions apply. Players may hold more than one non-FIFA nationality.

No.	Pos.	Nation	Player

Out: Note: Flags indicate national team as defined under FIFA eligibility rules; some limited exceptions apply. Players may hold more than one non-FIFA nationality.

No.	Pos.	Nation	Player

=== Hamyari Arak ===
In: Note: Flags indicate national team as defined under FIFA eligibility rules; some limited exceptions apply. Players may hold more than one non-FIFA nationality.

No.	Pos.	Nation	Player

Out: Note: Flags indicate national team as defined under FIFA eligibility rules; some limited exceptions apply. Players may hold more than one non-FIFA nationality.

No.	Pos.	Nation	Player

=== Iranjavan ===
In: Note: Flags indicate national team as defined under FIFA eligibility rules; some limited exceptions apply. Players may hold more than one non-FIFA nationality.

No.	Pos.	Nation	Player

Out: Note: Flags indicate national team as defined under FIFA eligibility rules; some limited exceptions apply. Players may hold more than one non-FIFA nationality.

No.	Pos.	Nation	Player

=== Machine Sazi ===
In: Note: Flags indicate national team as defined under FIFA eligibility rules; some limited exceptions apply. Players may hold more than one non-FIFA nationality.

No.	Pos.	Nation	Player

Out: Note: Flags indicate national team as defined under FIFA eligibility rules; some limited exceptions apply. Players may hold more than one non-FIFA nationality.

No.	Pos.	Nation	Player
—	FW	IRN	Saeid Hallafi (to Mes Sarcheshmeh)

=== Mes Rafsanjan ===
In: Note: Flags indicate national team as defined under FIFA eligibility rules; some limited exceptions apply. Players may hold more than one non-FIFA nationality.

No.	Pos.	Nation	Player

Out: Note: Flags indicate national team as defined under FIFA eligibility rules; some limited exceptions apply. Players may hold more than one non-FIFA nationality.

No.	Pos.	Nation	Player

=== Naft Masjed Soleyman ===
In: Note: Flags indicate national team as defined under FIFA eligibility rules; some limited exceptions apply. Players may hold more than one non-FIFA nationality.

No.	Pos.	Nation	Player

Out: Note: Flags indicate national team as defined under FIFA eligibility rules; some limited exceptions apply. Players may hold more than one non-FIFA nationality.

No.	Pos.	Nation	Player

=== Nassaji ===
In: Note: Flags indicate national team as defined under FIFA eligibility rules; some limited exceptions apply. Players may hold more than one non-FIFA nationality.

No.	Pos.	Nation	Player
13	MF	IRN	Hossin Baghlani (from Mes Sarcheshmeh)
26	DF	CRO	Ante Zurak (from Mes Sarcheshmeh)

Out: Note: Flags indicate national team as defined under FIFA eligibility rules; some limited exceptions apply. Players may hold more than one non-FIFA nationality.

No.	Pos.	Nation	Player

=== Nirooye Zamini ===
In: Note: Flags indicate national team as defined under FIFA eligibility rules; some limited exceptions apply. Players may hold more than one non-FIFA nationality.

No.	Pos.	Nation	Player

Out: Note: Flags indicate national team as defined under FIFA eligibility rules; some limited exceptions apply. Players may hold more than one non-FIFA nationality.

No.	Pos.	Nation	Player

=== Pas Hamadan ===
In: Note: Flags indicate national team as defined under FIFA eligibility rules; some limited exceptions apply. Players may hold more than one non-FIFA nationality.

No.	Pos.	Nation	Player
—	FW	IRN	Mohammad Reza Niknahal (from Naft Tehran)
—	FW	IRN	Amin Motevaselzadeh (from Foolad)

Out: Note: Flags indicate national team as defined under FIFA eligibility rules; some limited exceptions apply. Players may hold more than one non-FIFA nationality.

No.	Pos.	Nation	Player
—	GK	IRN	Mehdi Eslami (to Esteghlal)

=== Payam Mashhad ===
In: Note: Flags indicate national team as defined under FIFA eligibility rules; some limited exceptions apply. Players may hold more than one non-FIFA nationality.

No.	Pos.	Nation	Player

Out: Note: Flags indicate national team as defined under FIFA eligibility rules; some limited exceptions apply. Players may hold more than one non-FIFA nationality.

No.	Pos.	Nation	Player

=== Payam Mokhaberat ===
In: Note: Flags indicate national team as defined under FIFA eligibility rules; some limited exceptions apply. Players may hold more than one non-FIFA nationality.

No.	Pos.	Nation	Player

Out: Note: Flags indicate national team as defined under FIFA eligibility rules; some limited exceptions apply. Players may hold more than one non-FIFA nationality.

No.	Pos.	Nation	Player

=== Paykan ===
In: Note: Flags indicate national team as defined under FIFA eligibility rules; some limited exceptions apply. Players may hold more than one non-FIFA nationality.

No.	Pos.	Nation	Player
36	FW	IRN	Sajjad Feizollahi (from Naft Tehran)

Out: Note: Flags indicate national team as defined under FIFA eligibility rules; some limited exceptions apply. Players may hold more than one non-FIFA nationality.

No.	Pos.	Nation	Player

=== Saipa Shomal ===
In: Note: Flags indicate national team as defined under FIFA eligibility rules; some limited exceptions apply. Players may hold more than one non-FIFA nationality.

No.	Pos.	Nation	Player

Out: Note: Flags indicate national team as defined under FIFA eligibility rules; some limited exceptions apply. Players may hold more than one non-FIFA nationality.

No.	Pos.	Nation	Player

=== Sanati Kaveh ===
In: Note: Flags indicate national team as defined under FIFA eligibility rules; some limited exceptions apply. Players may hold more than one non-FIFA nationality.

No.	Pos.	Nation	Player

Out: Note: Flags indicate national team as defined under FIFA eligibility rules; some limited exceptions apply. Players may hold more than one non-FIFA nationality.

No.	Pos.	Nation	Player

=== Sanat Sari ===
In: Note: Flags indicate national team as defined under FIFA eligibility rules; some limited exceptions apply. Players may hold more than one non-FIFA nationality.

No.	Pos.	Nation	Player

Out: Note: Flags indicate national team as defined under FIFA eligibility rules; some limited exceptions apply. Players may hold more than one non-FIFA nationality.

No.	Pos.	Nation	Player

=== Shahrdari Bandar Abbas ===
In: Note: Flags indicate national team as defined under FIFA eligibility rules; some limited exceptions apply. Players may hold more than one non-FIFA nationality.

No.	Pos.	Nation	Player

Out: Note: Flags indicate national team as defined under FIFA eligibility rules; some limited exceptions apply. Players may hold more than one non-FIFA nationality.

No.	Pos.	Nation	Player
—	MF	IRN	Rahim Mehdi Zahiri (to Naft Tehran)

=== Shahrdari Yasuj ===
In: Note: Flags indicate national team as defined under FIFA eligibility rules; some limited exceptions apply. Players may hold more than one non-FIFA nationality.

No.	Pos.	Nation	Player
—	GK	IRN	Asghar Karamollahi (from Mes Sarcheshmeh)

Out: Note: Flags indicate national team as defined under FIFA eligibility rules; some limited exceptions apply. Players may hold more than one non-FIFA nationality.

No.	Pos.	Nation	Player
22	GK	IRN	Hossein Hooshyar (to Persepolis)
—	FW	IRN	Meghdad Ghobakhlou (to Mes Kerman)

=== Shirin Faraz ===
In: Note: Flags indicate national team as defined under FIFA eligibility rules; some limited exceptions apply. Players may hold more than one non-FIFA nationality.

No.	Pos.	Nation	Player

Out: Note: Flags indicate national team as defined under FIFA eligibility rules; some limited exceptions apply. Players may hold more than one non-FIFA nationality.

No.	Pos.	Nation	Player

=== Steel Azin ===
In: Note: Flags indicate national team as defined under FIFA eligibility rules; some limited exceptions apply. Players may hold more than one non-FIFA nationality.

No.	Pos.	Nation	Player

Out: Note: Flags indicate national team as defined under FIFA eligibility rules; some limited exceptions apply. Players may hold more than one non-FIFA nationality.

No.	Pos.	Nation	Player

=== Tarbiat Yazd ===
In: Note: Flags indicate national team as defined under FIFA eligibility rules; some limited exceptions apply. Players may hold more than one non-FIFA nationality.

No.	Pos.	Nation	Player

Out: Note: Flags indicate national team as defined under FIFA eligibility rules; some limited exceptions apply. Players may hold more than one non-FIFA nationality.

No.	Pos.	Nation	Player
