= Kaveh Rezaei =

Iranian footballer

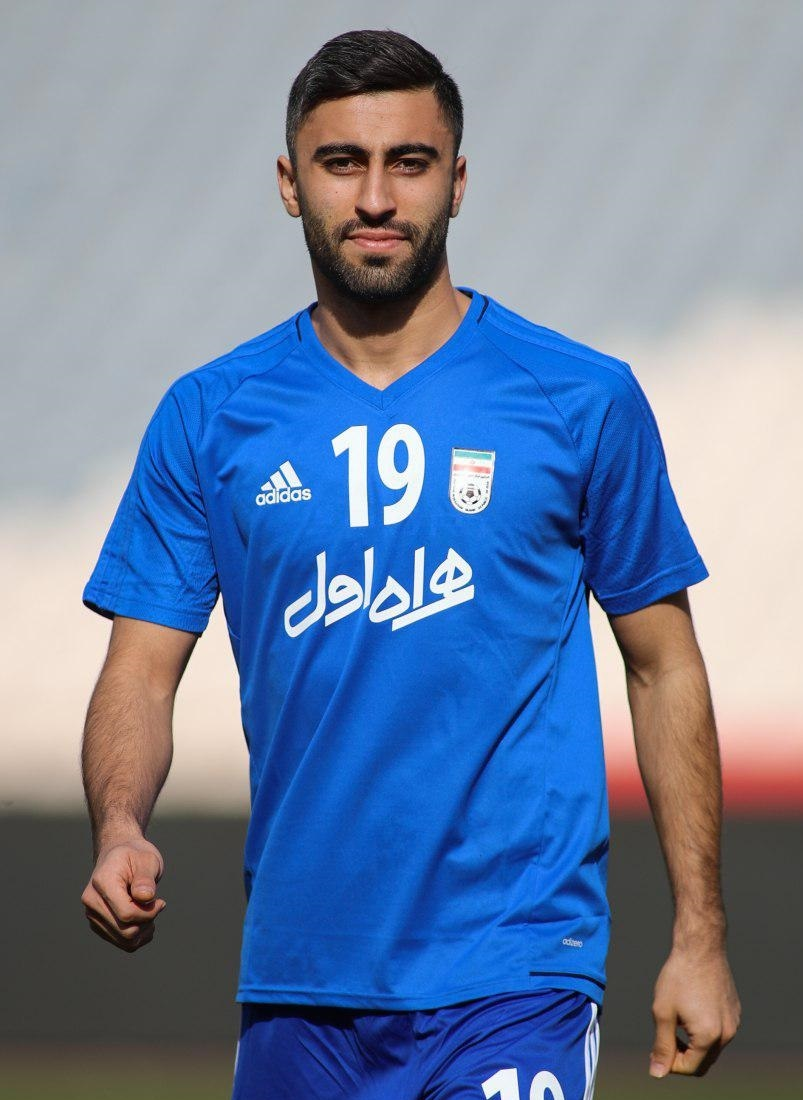

Personal information
- Full name: Kaveh Rezaei
- Date of birth: 5 April 1992 (age 34)
- Place of birth: Eslamabad Gharb, Iran
- Height: 1.85 m (6 ft 1 in)
- Position: Forward

Team information
- Current team: Sepahan
- Number: 9

Youth career
- 2005–2009: Foolad

Senior career*
Years	Team	Apps	(Gls)
2009–2012	Foolad	33	(1)
2012–2015	Saipa	69	(12)
2015–2016	Zob Ahan	34	(11)
2016–2017	Esteghlal	28	(7)
2017–2018	Royal Charleroi	39	(16)
2018–2021	Club Brugge	11	(1)
2019–2021	→ Royal Charleroi (loan)	46	(22)
2021–2022	Oud-Heverlee Leuven	13	(0)
2022–2023	Tractor	6	(2)
2023–	Sepahan	68	(13)

International career^{‡}
2007–2009	Iran U17	13	(10)
2009–2010	Iran U20	3	(5)
2012–2014	Iran U23	19	(11)
2015–2022	Iran	18	(4)
- * Club domestic league appearances and goals as of 24 December 2023 ‡ National team caps and goals as of 15 June 2021

Kaveh Rezaei (Persian: کاوه رضایی) is an Iranian professional footballer who plays as a striker for Sepahan and the Iran national team.

== Club career ==
=== Foolad ===
Rezaei started his career at Foolad. In the 2010–11 season, he scored one goal and provided two assists for his teammates in 16 games. During the next season, Rezaei played in 12 games starting in 4 and playing the whole 90 minutes in one of those games.

=== Saipa ===
Rezaei transferred to Saipa to gain more playing time in the 2012–13 season. Although he was not a regular starter, he managed to make 33 appearances, scoring 5 times against Saba, Paykan, Fajr Sepasi and Gahar. He also provided 2 assists during the season. During the 2014–15 season, Rezaei expressed that he does not intend to renew his contract with Saipa and the club transfer listed him in January to make money from his transfer.

=== Zob Ahan ===
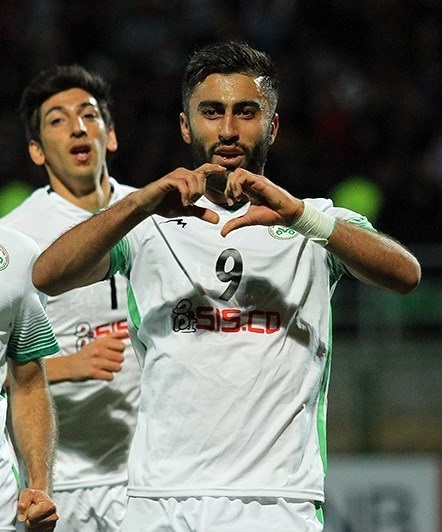
Rezaei celebrating his goal against Bunyodkor in 2016

On 28 December 2014, Rezaei joined Zob Ahan with an 18-month contract which would keep him until the end of 2015–16 season with the Isfahani side.

He made his debut for the club on 30 January 2015, in a 1–0 win against Persepolis in which he assisted Masoud Hassanzadeh's single goal of the game. The following week he scored his first goal for the club in a 3–0 away victory against Rah Ahan. On 16 April 2015, he scored a hat-trick in a 5–3 victory against Naft Tehran. He also featured in the 2015 Hazfi Cup Final where Zob Ahan beat Naft Tehran 3–1 to win the title in which Rezaei scored Zob Ahan's third goal.

Rezaei made his first appearance of the 2015–16 season against Malavan on the opening day of the Persian Gulf Pro League season. He scored his first goal of the season in 2–1 win against Persepolis. On 29 May 2016, Rezaei won the Hazfi Cup for the second consecutive time, playing 111 minutes in the final as Zob Ahan defeated Esteghlal 5–4 in penalties.

=== Esteghlal ===
On 16 June 2016, Rezaei refused to extend contract with Zob Ahan and signed a contract with Esteghlal. He later revealed that he had an offer from Persepolis before but rejected it for personal reasons. He was handed the number 9 jersey that was previously held by Esteghlal's legend Arash Borhani.

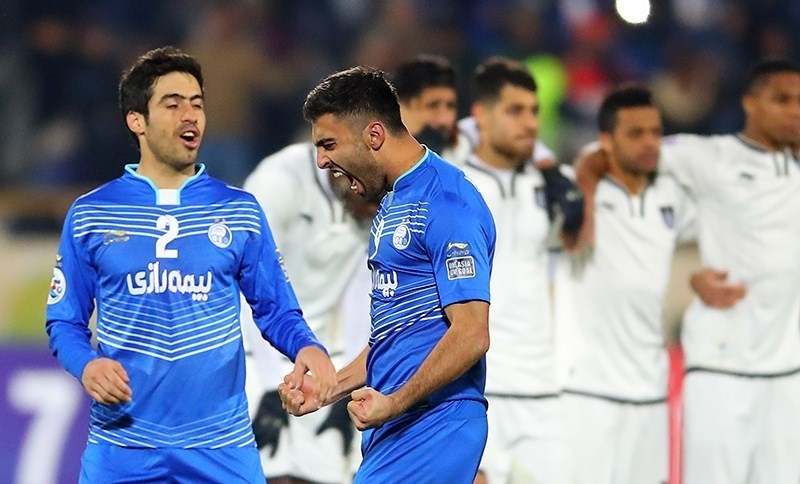
Rezaei celebrating after converting his penalty against Al Sadd along with Khosro Heydari.

Rezaei made his debut on 25 July 2016 in a 1–1 draw against Naft Tehran and he assisted Jaber Ansari's goal. In the next match on 31 July, he scored his first goal for Esteghlal in a 2–1 loss against Esteghlal Khuzestan. He scored a header in a 1–1 draw against Machine Sazi on 11 September. On 12 February 2017, Esteghlal defeated city rivals Persepolis 3–2, with Rezaei scoring the third goal. On 27 February 2017, in an AFC Champions League group-stage match against Al-Taawoun FC, he scored 53 seconds after kick-off; it was the fastest goal scored by an Iranian in an AFC Champions League match. On 11 April, he scored another champions league goal against Lokomotiv Tashkent to equalise the scoreline, as the game ended 1–1. In the following champions league game against Al-Ahli, the match finished at 1–1, where he scored another equaliser. On 4 May 2017, he assisted Jaber Ansari's goal in Esteghlal's 2–1 win against Sepahan. This assist made him the top provider in the league. He finished the season with 7 goals and 9 assists as Esteghlal finished the season as runners-up in the league. On 10 May, he scored and assisted in the champions league match against Al-Taawoun as Esteghlal beat their opponent 2–1 and qualified to the next round. On 22 May, he scored a late winning goal from the penalty spot against Al Ain the match finished 1–0.

=== Charleroi ===
On 14 June 2017, after rumours that he would sign a contract extension with Esteghlal, Rezaei signed a two-year contract, with an option to extend for another two years, with Belgian Pro League club Sporting Charleroi. He was assigned the shirt number 9.

==== 2017–18 season ====
Rezaei made his debut for the club in a 1–0 victory over Kortrijk on 29 June 2017, coming on as substitute for Chris Bedia. On 26 August, he scored his first goal for the club, against Zulte Waregem. Later in that match he scored his second goal to help win the match 3–2. After his stunning performance in September and scoring two goals in four games, Rezaei was voted as club's best player of the month by the fans. On 18 November, he scored a brace against KV Mechelen and dedicated his goals to his fellow citizens who suffered in earthquake.

==== 2018–19 season ====
Rezaei started the new season by scoring a brace in a 4–1 victory over Eupen.

=== Club Brugge ===
On 22 August 2018, Rezaei joined Club Brugge for a reported club-record fee of €5,000,000.

=== Return to Charleroi ===
On 27 August 2019, he rejoined Charleroi on loan.

On 31 July 2020, he joined Charleroi on another season-long loan.

=== Oud-Heverlee Leuven ===
On 4 August 2021, OH Leuven announced the signing of Rezaei for a one-year deal with an option of an extra year.

== International ==
=== Youth ===
==== U17 ====
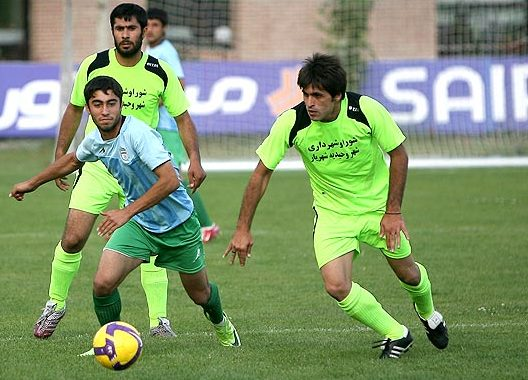
Rezaei with Iran national under-17 football team in a friendly match in 2009

Rezaei finished as the top scorer of the 2008 AFC U-16 Championship scoring in every single game he played in and finishing with 6 goals in 5 games. Iran won the championship winning the final game 2–0 against South Korea.

Rezaei featured for Iran in the 2009 FIFA U-17 World Cup scoring a goal against Gambia.

==== U19 ====
Rezaei also made the squad for the unsuccessful 2010 AFC U-19 Championship. Surprisingly his involvement was highly limited under the guidance of his former U17 manager, Ali Doustimehr. However, he started in Iran's last game of the group stages, scoring both goals in the game and helping to record Iran's only win of the tournament.

==== U23 ====
In 2012, he broke in to coach Ali Reza Mansourian's squad and has been regular feature ever since. He was called up for the 2013 AFC U-22 Championship, where he was the leading goalscorer after the group stage with 5 goals in 3 matches, including a hat trick in his last game. He named in Iran U23 final list for Incheon 2014.

=== Senior ===
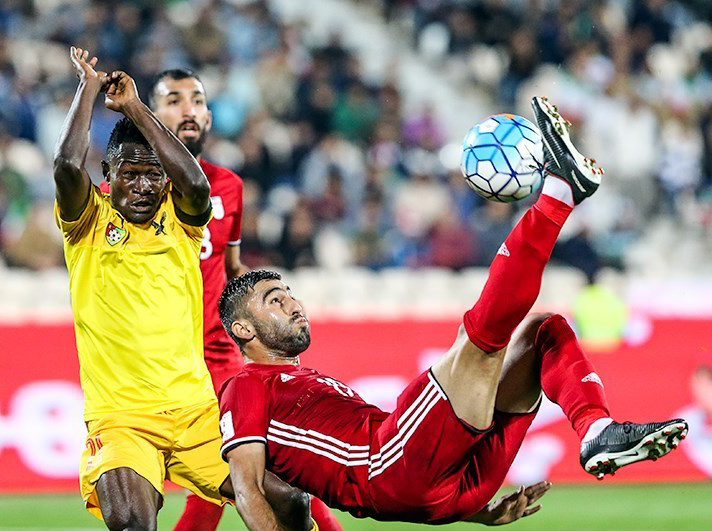
Rezaei attempting a bicycle kick in a friendly against Togo in 2017.

Rezaei received his first call-up to the senior side on 30 August 2015 replacing injured Alireza Jahanbakhsh. He made his debut against India during Iran's 2018 World Cup Qualification campaign on 8 September 2015. After a 2-year absence from the international side, Rezaei received another call-up on 1 October 2017 to play for Iran in friendlies against Togo and Russia. On 17 March 2018, he scored his first international goal in a 4–0 victory against Sierra Leone. In May 2018, he was named in Iran's preliminary squad for the 2018 World Cup in Russia but did not make the final 23.

== Style of play ==
Rezaei is a forward known for his aerial ability and finishing. Primarily a centre-forward, he has also been deployed on the wings during his career.

== Personal life ==
In May 2017, Rezaei married with Iran women's national volleyball team player Farnoosh Sheikhi. His father in law, Fereydoun Sheikhi was killed in a plane crash in January 2019.

His idol was Thierry Henry. He is a friend to Mehdi Rahmati, Bakhtiar Rahmani and Soroush Rafiei. He cites Navid Mohammadzadeh as his favourite actor. He can speak Persian and Kurdish fluently.

== Career statistics ==
=== Club ===
As of match played 24 December 2023

Appearances and goals by club, season and competition
Club	Season	League			Cup		Continental^{1}		Other^{2}		Total	
Club	Season	Division	Apps	Goals	Apps	Goals	Apps	Goals	Apps	Goals	Apps	Goals
Foolad	2009–10	Persian Gulf Pro League	7	0	1	0	—		—		8	0
Foolad	2010–11	Persian Gulf Pro League	14	1	1	0	—		—		15	1
Foolad	2011–12	Persian Gulf Pro League	12	0	0	0	—		—		12	0
Foolad	Total		33	1	2	0	—		—		35	1
Saipa	2012–13	Persian Gulf Pro League	33	5	0	0	—		—		33	5
Saipa	2013–14	Persian Gulf Pro League	25	6	1	0	—		—		26	6
Saipa	2014–15	Persian Gulf Pro League	11	1	2	1	—		—		13	2
Saipa	Total		69	12	3	1	—		—		72	13
Zob Ahan	2014–15	Persian Gulf Pro League	10	5	1	1	—		—		11	6
Zob Ahan	2015–16	Persian Gulf Pro League	24	6	3	0	7	2	0	0	34	8
Zob Ahan	Total		34	11	4	1	7	2	0	0	45	14
Esteghlal	2016–17	Persian Gulf Pro League	28	7	3	0	9	6	—		40	13
Charleroi	2017–18	Belgian First Division A	29	12	2	0	—		10	4	41	16
Charleroi	2018–19	Belgian First Division A	4	3	0	0	—		—		4	3
Charleroi	Total		33	15	2	0	—		10	4	45	19
Club Brugge	2018–19	Belgian First Division A	11	1	0	0	2	0	0	0	13	1
Club Brugge	2019–20	Belgian First Division A	0	0	0	0	1	0	0	0	1	0
Club Brugge	Total		11	1	0	0	3	0	0	0	14	1
Charleroi (loan)	2019–20	Belgian First Division A	22	12	3	2	—		—		25	14
Charleroi (loan)	2020–21	Belgian First Division A	5	5	0	0	0	0	—		5	5
Charleroi (loan)	Total		27	17	3	2	0	0	0	0	30	19
Oud-Heverlee Leuven	2021–22	Belgian Pro League	12	0	1	0	0	0	0	0	13	0
Tractor	2022–23	Persian Gulf Pro League	6	2	1	0	0	0	0	0	7	2
Sepahan	2023–24	Persian Gulf Pro League	9	2	0	0	2	0	0	0	11	2
Career total			262	68	19	4	21	8	10	4	312	84

^{1} Includes AFC Champions League matches.
^{2} Includes Iranian Super Cup and Belgian First Division A Championship Playoff.

=== International ===
As of 15 June 2021.

Iran
Year	Apps	Goals
2015	4	0
2017	3	0
2018	5	1
2019	1	0
2020	2	1
2021	3	2
Total	18	4

==== International goals ====
Scores and results list Iran's goal tally first.

No.	Date	Venue	Opponent	Score	Result	Competition
1.	17 March 2018	Azadi Stadium, Tehran, Iran	Sierra Leone	3–0	4–0	Friendly
2.	12 November 2020	Koševo City Stadium, Sarajevo, Bosnia and Herzegovina	Bosnia and Herzegovina	1–0	2–0	Friendly
3.	11 June 2021	Bahrain National Stadium, Riffa, Bahrain	Cambodia	8–0	10–0	2022 FIFA World Cup qualification
4.	11 June 2021	Bahrain National Stadium, Riffa, Bahrain	Cambodia	10–0	10–0	2022 FIFA World Cup qualification

== Honours ==
=== Club ===
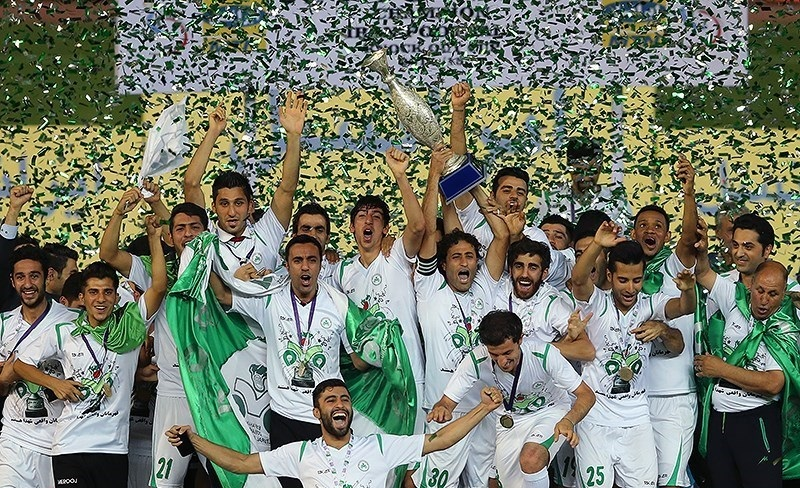
Rezaei (sitting in the middle) celebrating with Zob Ahan teammates after winning the 2015 Hazfi Shield Cup

Zob Ahan

- Hazfi Cup: 2014–15, 2015–16

Sepahan

- Hazfi Cup: 2023–24

=== International ===
Iran U-16

- AFC U-16 Championship: 2008

=== Individual ===
- AFC U-16 Championship Top Scorer: 2008
- AFC U-22 Championship Top Scorer: 2013
- Persian Gulf Pro League Most Assists: 2016–17
- Persian Gulf Pro League Team of the Year: 2016–17
