= Mehdi Chamanara =

Iranian footballer

Mehdi Chaman ara
Personal information
- Full name: Mehdi Chaman ara
- Position: Midfielder

Team information
- Current team: Foolad
- Number: 5

Senior career*
Years	Team	Apps	(Gls)
2005–2007	Foolad	22	(0)
2007–2009	Malavan	21	(0)
2009–2011	Foolad	31	(0)
- * Club domestic league appearances and goals as of 27 September 2010 ‡ National team caps and goals as of 23 February 2010

Mehdi Chaman ara soccer player who played for Foolad F.C.

== Club career ==
Chaman ara joined Foolad in 2009 after spending the previous two seasons at Malavan F.C.

=== Club career statistics ===
As of 19 October 2010

Club performance			League		Cup		Continental		Total	
Season	Club	League	Apps	Goals	Apps	Goals	Apps	Goals	Apps	Goals
Iran			League		Hazfi Cup		Asia		Total	
2005–06	Foolad	Persian Gulf Cup	0	0						
2006–07	Foolad	Persian Gulf Cup	22	0	2	0	-	-	24	0
2007–08	Malavan	Persian Gulf Cup	1	0	1	0	-	-	2	0
2008–09	Malavan	Persian Gulf Cup	20	0	1	0	-	-	21	0
2009–10	Foolad	Persian Gulf Cup	24	0	1	0	-	-	25	1
2010–11	Foolad	Persian Gulf Cup	7	0	1	0	-	-	8	0
Total	Iran		74	0			0	0		
Career total			74	0			0	0		

- Assist Goals

Season	Team	Assists
09–10	Foolad	1
10–11	Foolad	1
