= 2010–11 Persian Gulf Cup =

10th season of Persian Gulf Pro League

Persian Gulf Cup
- Season: 2010–11
- Champions: Sepahan; 3rd Pro League title 3rd Iranian title
- Relegated: PAS Hamedan; Paykan; Steel Azin
- Champions League: Sepahan; Esteghlal; Zob Ahan; Persepolis (Hazfi Cup champions)
- Matches: 306
- Goals: 742 (2.42 per match)
- Top goalscorer: Reza Norouzi (24 goals)
- Biggest home win: Foolad 6–0 Paykan (17 September 2010); Zob Ahan 6–0 Sanat Naft (18 February 2011)
- Biggest away win: Steel Azin 1–6 Shahrdari Tabriz (15 May 2011)
- Highest scoring: Saipa 5–5 Foolad (24 October 2010)
- Longest winning run: 4 matches Sepahan
- Longest unbeaten run: 21 matches Sepahan
- Longest winless run: 17 matches PAS Hamedan
- Longest losing run: 5 matches Paykan, Persepolis
- Highest attendance: 100,000; Esteghlal – Persepolis (15 October 2010)
- Lowest attendance: 0 (spectator ban); Tractor Sazi – Rah Ahan (1 August 2010); Sanat Naft – Saipa (1 August 2010); Shahrdari Tabriz – Tractor Sazi (5 August 2010); Persepolis – Saipa (6 August 2010); Tractor Sazi – PAS Hamedan (14 August 2010); Sanat Naft – Persepolis (15 August 2010)
- Total attendance: 2,815,000
- Average attendance: 9,383

The 2010–11 Persian Gulf Cup (also known as Iran Pro League) was the 28th season of Iran's Football League and tenth as Iran Pro League since its establishment in 2001. Sepahan were the defending champions. The season featured 15 teams from the 2009–10 Persian Gulf Cup and three new teams promoted from the 2009–10 Azadegan League: Shahrdari Tabriz and Naft Tehran both as champions and Sanat Naft. The league started on 26 July 2010 and ended on 20 May 2011. Sepahan won the Pro League title for the third time in their history (total third Iranian title). Foolad's Reza Norouzi was the top goalscorer with 24 goals.

== Teams ==
=== Stadia and locations ===
Locations of clubs in 2010–11 Persian Gulf Cup

Team	City	Venue	Capacity
Esteghlal	Tehran	Azadi	95,225
Foolad	Ahvaz	Takhti Ahvaz	20,000
Malavan	Anzali	Takhti Anzali	8,000
Mes Kerman	Kerman	Shahid Bahonar	12,000
Naft Tehran	Tehran	Rah Ahan	15,000
PAS Hamedan	Hamedan	Shahid Mofatteh	10,000
Paykan	Qazvin	Shahid Rajaei	5,000
Persepolis	Tehran	Azadi	95,225
Rah Ahan	Shahr-e-Rey	Rah Ahan	15,000
Saba Qom	Qom	Yadegar Emam Qom	12,000
Saipa	Karaj	Enghelab Karaj	14,000
Sanat Naft	Abadan	Takhti Abadan	15,000
Sepahan	Esfahan	Foolad Shahr	20,000
Shahin	Bushehr	Shahid Beheshti	14,000
Shahrdari Tabriz	Tabriz	Yadegar Emam Tabriz	70,000
Steel Azin	Tehran	Shahid Dastgerdi	12,000
Tractor Sazi	Tabriz	Yadegar Emam Tabriz	80,451
Zob Ahan	Esfahan	Foolad Shahr	20,000

=== Personnel and sponsoring ===
Team	Head coach	Team captain	Kit maker	Shirt sponsor	Past Season
Esteghlal	(Iran) Parviz Mazloomi	(Iran) Farhad Majidi	Uhlsport	Tehran Municipality & City Bank	3rd
Foolad	(Iran) Majid Jalali	(Iran) Saeed Ramezani	Daei Sport	Foolad Khuzestan Co.	10th
Malavan	(Iran) Farhad Pourgholami	(Iran) Pejman Nouri	Merooj	Anzali Free Zone	12th
Mes Kerman	(Iran) Samad Marfavi	(Iran) Farzad Hosseinkhani	Uhlsport	Gashte Gole Yas Travel Agency	9th
Naft Tehran	(Iran) Hossein Faraki	(Iran) Darius Mikaeili	Daei Sport	National Iranian Oil Company	Promoted
Pas Hamedan	(Iran) Ali Asghar Modir Roosta	(Iran) Saman Safa	JEJ	Unsponsored	14th
Paykan	(Iran) Hamid Alidousti	(Iran) Rahman Rezaei	Merooj	Iran Khodro	11th
Persepolis	(Iran) Ali Daei	(Iran) Karim Bagheri	Uhlsport	Tehran Municipality & City Bank	4th
Rah Ahan	(Iran) Rasoul Korbekandi	(Iran) Ebrahim Karimi	Aghili	RAJA	15th
Saba Qom	(Iran) Abdollah Veisi	(Iran) Sohrab Bakhtiarizadeh	Daei Sport	Varna	6th
Saipa	(Iran) Mohammad Mayeli Kohan	(Iran) Ebrahim Sadeghi	Nahangi	SAIPA	8th
Sanat Naft	(Iran) Gholam Hossein Peyrovani	(Iran) Hassan Houri	Daei Sport	National Iranian Oil Company	Promoted
Sepahan	(Iran) Amir Ghalenoei	(Iran) Moharram Navidkia	Lotto	Foolad Mobarakeh Complex	Champion
Shahin	(Iran) Hamid Estili	(Iran) Reza Baziari	Nahangi	Unsponsered	13th
Shahrdari Tabriz	(Iran) Hamid Derakhshan	(Iran) Ebrahim Abarghouei	Uhlsport	City Bank	Promoted
Steel Azin	(Iran) Mahmoud Yavari	(Iran) Mehdi Mahdavikia	Umbro	Steel Azin Company	5th
Tractor Sazi	(Iran) Faraz Kamalvand	(Iran) Mohammad Nosrati	Uhlsport	Hamrah Aval & Bank Sepah	7th
Zob Ahan	(Iran) Mansour Ebrahimzadeh	(Iran) Mohammad Salsali	Uhlsport	Zob Ahan Steel Co.	2nd

== Managerial changes ==
=== Before the start of the season ===
Team	Outgoing head coach	Manner of departure	Date of vacancy	Position in table	Incoming head coach	Date of appointment
Esteghlal	(Iran) Samad Marfavi	Resigned	22 May 2010	Pre-season	(Iran) Parviz Mazloomi	11 June 2010
Mes Kerman	(Croatia) Luka Bonačić	Contract expired	22 May 2010	Pre-season	(Iran) Samad Marfavi	26 May 2010
Saba Qom	(Iran) Rasoul Korbekandi	Contract expired	22 May 2010	Pre-season	(Iran) Mahmoud Yavari	14 June 2010
Shahin	(Iran) Mahmoud Yavari	Contract expired	22 May 2010	Pre-season	(Iran) Hamid Estili	16 June 2010
Rah Ahan	(Iran) Mehdi Tartar	Contract expired	22 May 2010	Pre-season	(Iran) Rasoul Korbekandi	16 June 2010
Paykan	(Iran) Hamid Derakhshan	Contract expired	22 May 2010	Pre-season	(Iran) Mohammad Ahmadzadeh	21 June 2010
Steel Azin	(Iran) Afshin Peyrovani	Contract expired	5 July 2010	Pre-season	(Serbia) Ljubiša Tumbaković	5 July 2010

=== In season ===
Team	Outgoing head coach	Manner of departure	Date of vacancy	Position in table	Incoming head coach	Date of appointment
Rah Ahan	(Iran) Rasoul Korbekandi	Sacked	7 Sep 2010	18	(Iran) Mehdi Tartar	8 Sep 2010
Paykan	(Iran) Mohammad Ahmadzadeh	Resigned	10 Oct 2010	18	(Iran) Hamid Alidousti	15 Oct 2010
Steel Azin	(Serbia) Ljubiša Tumbaković	Sacked	13 Oct 2010	13	(Iran) Afshin Peyrovani	14 Oct 2010
Shahrdari Tabriz	(Iran) Akbar Misaghian	Resigned	22 Oct 2010	17	(Iran) Hamid Derakhshan	26 Oct 2010
Saba Qom	(Iran) Mahmoud Yavari	Sacked	25 Oct 2010	8	(Iran) Abdollah Veysi	2 Nov 2010
Steel Azin	(Iran) Afshin Peyrovani	Resigned	23 Nov 2010	18	(Iran) Mohammad Khakpour	6 Dec 2010
PAS Hamedan	(Iran) Ali Asghar Modir Roosta	Resigned	8 Dec 2010	13	(Iran) Mahmoud Yavari	12 Dec 2010
Sanat Naft	(Portugal) Acácio Casimiro	Sacked	24 Feb 2011	9	(Iran) Gholam Hossein Peyrovani	7 Mar 2011
Steel Azin	(Iran) Mohammad Khakpour	Resigned	3 Mar 2011	18	(Iran) Mahmoud Yavari	14 Mar 2011
PAS Hamedan	(Iran) Mahmoud Yavari	Resigned	8 Mar 2011	18	(Iran) Ali Asghar Modir Roosta	10 Mar 2011
Shahin Bushehr	(Iran) Hamid Estili	Sacked	2 Apr 2011	16	(Iran) Akbar Misaghian	4 Apr 2011
Paykan	(Iran) Hamid Alidousti	Sacked	3 Apr 2011	17	(Iran) Mohammad Hossein Ziaei	5 Apr 2011

== League table ==
Pos	Team	Pld	W	D	L	GF	GA	GD	Pts	Qualification or relegation
1	Sepahan (C)	34	18	12	4	56	29	+27	66	Qualification for the 2012 AFC Champions League group stage
2	Esteghlal	34	18	11	5	55	34	+21	65	Qualification for the 2012 AFC Champions League Qualifying play-off
3	Zob Ahan	34	18	9	7	49	31	+18	63	Qualification for the 2012 AFC Champions League Qualifying play-off
4	Persepolis	34	17	7	10	50	36	+14	58	Qualification for 2012 AFC Champions League group stage (Note: Persepolis qualified to AFC Champions League group stage directly by winning the Hazfi Cup)
5	Tractor Sazi	34	15	12	7	42	29	+13	57	
6	Foolad	34	14	12	8	58	36	+22	54	
7	Mes	34	13	13	8	41	30	+11	52	
8	Malavan	34	13	9	12	33	32	+1	48	
9	Sanat Naft	34	13	3	18	36	54	−18	42	
10	Saba	34	9	14	11	39	40	−1	41	
11	Saipa	34	8	13	13	42	47	−5	37	
12	Shahrdari T.	34	8	13	13	45	53	−8	37	
13	Naft T.	34	7	15	12	38	44	−6	36	
14	Shahin B.	34	8	11	15	31	37	−6	35	
15	Rah Ahan	34	8	11	15	29	39	−10	35	
16	Pas H. (R)	34	8	11	15	30	48	−18	35	Relegation to the 2011–12 Azadegan League
17	Paykan (R)	34	9	6	19	38	60	−22	33	Relegation to the 2011–12 Azadegan League
18	Steel Azin (R)	34	6	10	18	30	63	−33	28	Relegation to the 2011–12 Azadegan League

Updated to match(es) played on 1 SEP 2018. Source: IPL Stats, Soccerway
Rules for classification: 1) Points; 2) Goal difference; 3) Goals scored.
(C) Champions; (R) Relegated

== Positions by round ==
Team ╲ Round	1	2	3	4	5	6	7	8	9	10	11	12	13	14	15	16	17	18	19	20	21	22	23	24	25	26	27	28	29	30	31	32	33	34
Sepahan	11	14	13	9	10	8	10	6	7	4	3	4	4	3	5	4	3	3	3	2	3	3	3	3	2	2	1	1	1	1	1	1	1	1
Esteghlal	1	6	9	10	6	6	3	3	3	3	2	2	2	4	3	2	2	2	2	5	2	2	2	2	3	3	3	3	3	3	2	2	2	2
Zob Ahan	3	2	3	1	1	2	1	1	1	1	1	1	1	1	1	1	1	1	1	1	1	1	1	1	1	1	2	2	2	2	3	3	3	3
Persepolis	4	7	4	3	2	1	2	2	2	2	4	3	3	2	2	5	5	7	7	6	6	6	6	5	4	5	5	5	5	5	5	4	4	4
Tractor Sazi	18	5	8	12	13	10	5	8	9	6	7	7	8	7	7	7	6	5	5	4	4	4	4	4	5	4	4	4	4	4	4	5	5	5
Foolad	15	8	10	7	8	9	8	10	5	9	10	11	7	10	10	10	8	8	8	8	7	7	7	7	7	6	6	7	6	7	6	6	6	6
Mes Kerman	16	16	17	14	15	11	12	12	13	10	5	6	5	5	4	3	4	4	4	3	5	5	5	6	6	7	7	8	7	8	7	7	7	7
Malavan	8	13	7	8	9	13	11	14	12	7	9	10	11	9	8	9	11	11	10	11	10	10	9	10	9	8	8	6	8	6	8	8	8	8
Sanat Naft	2	3	1	2	5	3	4	4	6	5	6	5	6	6	6	6	7	6	6	7	9	9	10	9	10	9	9	9	9	9	9	9	9	9
Saba Qom	17	9	11	6	7	5	7	5	8	11	11	8	9	11	11	11	9	9	9	9	8	8	8	8	8	10	10	10	10	10	10	10	10	10
Saipa	6	11	14	15	12	14	16	11	14	15	13	13	13	13	14	14	16	15	12	14	13	12	12	11	11	11	11	11	13	13	15	15	14	11
Sh. Tabriz	12	18	15	17	16	16	17	18	18	17	17	17	17	17	17	15	17	16	14	17	14	13	13	16	16	15	15	14	12	14	14	14	11	12
Naft Tehran	9	4	6	11	11	12	14	9	11	12	14	15	14	15	12	13	12	12	16	15	17	15	15	15	13	14	13	13	11	11	13	16	16	13
Shahin Bushehr	14	10	12	13	14	15	13	15	15	16	15	14	15	14	15	16	15	18	15	12	12	14	14	14	14	13	14	16	15	12	11	11	12	14
Rah Ahan	10	15	16	18	18	18	18	17	16	14	12	9	10	8	9	8	10	10	11	10	11	11	11	12	12	12	12	12	16	16	16	13	15	15
PAS Hamedan	5	12	5	4	3	4	6	7	4	8	8	12	12	12	13	12	13	13	13	16	15	16	17	17	18	18	17	15	14	15	12	12	13	16
Paykan	13	17	18	16	17	17	15	16	17	18	18	18	18	18	18	17	14	14	17	13	16	17	16	13	15	16	16	17	17	17	17	17	17	17
Steel Azin	7	1	2	5	4	7	9	13	10	13	16	16	16	16	16	18	18	17	18	18	18	18	18	18	17	17	18	18	18	18	18	18	18	18

Leader
2012 AFC Champions League Qualifying play-off
Relegation to 2011–12 Azadegan League

Source: Cups.ir (in Persian)

== Results ==
Home \ Away	SEP	EST	ZOB	PRS	TRK	FOL	MES	MLV	SNA	SAB	SAP	SHT	NAF	SHB	RAH	PAS	PAY	STL
Sepahan		1–1	2–0	0–0	1–0	3–2	1–1	0–0	2–0	0–0	4–1	1–0	2–0	1–0	2–2	2–1	3–2	5–0
Esteghlal	4–3		1–2	1–0	1–2	1–2	0–0	2–0	6–2	2–0	3–2	0–0	3–1	2–1	1–0	3–2	3–0	2–2
Zob Ahan	1–0	1–1		0–3	0–0	1–1	2–0	3–0	6–0	2–1	0–2	2–1	2–0	2–1	0–0	1–0	2–1	2–0
Persepolis	1–4	0–1	2–0		1–0	3–1	0–0	2–3	2–0	1–4	2–1	0–0	3–1	2–1	0–0	1–1	5–1	2–1
Tractor Sazi	1–3	1–1	1–2	1–0		1–1	1–0	2–0	3–1	1–2	2–2	1–0	3–1	2–1	3–1	0–1	2–1	3–0
Foolad	1–1	4–1	2–2	1–1	1–1		1–0	1–0	4–1	0–0	2–1	4–0	2–1	1–0	0–0	5–2	6–0	0–1
Mes Kerman	3–2	1–1	1–2	1–0	1–1	1–0		1–0	2–0	2–1	1–0	5–2	0–0	3–0	2–0	0–0	1–1	1–0
Malavan	0–0	0–1	1–0	2–1	2–0	1–0	2–1		2–1	2–0	2–3	0–0	1–1	3–2	1–0	3–0	2–0	0–1
Sanat Naft	0–1	2–0	2–1	0–1	1–3	2–2	1–0	2–1		3–1	1–0	1–1	1–0	1–0	0–1	2–0	2–1	2–0
Saba Qom	1–1	1–1	1–2	2–1	0–0	1–1	1–1	1–0	0–0		1–1	4–4	2–2	0–1	5–2	1–1	2–1	1–0
Saipa	2–1	0–0	0–2	0–1	1–1	5–5	2–4	1–1	1–0	1–0		0–1	0–0	2–1	0–1	2–1	1–1	2–2
Sh. Tabriz	1–2	2–3	1–1	1–1	1–1	0–2	2–1	2–1	3–2	0–1	2–2		1–0	2–2	1–0	2–2	2–4	3–0
Naft Tehran	0–0	0–0	1–2	1–5	1–1	0–3	1–1	0–0	5–1	0–0	0–0	3–1		2–2	1–0	4–1	4–1	2–2
Shahin Bushehr	0–0	0–0	1–1	1–2	0–0	2–0	1–1	0–1	1–2	0–0	1–0	1–1	0–1		2–0	0–1	2–1	1–1
Rah Ahan	1–1	0–1	2–2	2–3	0–1	1–0	2–2	2–0	0–2	0–2	0–0	0–1	1–0	1–1		2–1	0–0	3–0
PAS Hamedan	0–1	0–2	2–1	1–2	0–0	0–0	1–0	1–1	1–0	1–0	2–2	1–1	1–1	1–2	1–0		1–0	1–1
Paykan	2–4	1–3	0–0	3–0	1–2	0–2	1–2	1–1	1–0	3–2	1–0	1–0	1–3	0–1	1–0	3–1		3–1
Steel Azin	1–2	1–3	0–2	0–2	0–1	2–1	1–1	0–0	2–1	3–1	1–5	1–6	1–1	0–2	2–2	3–0	0–0	

Updated to match(es) played on 20 May 2011. Source: IPL Stats
Legend: Blue = home team win; Yellow = draw; Red = away team win.

== Clubs season-progress ==
Team ╲ Round	1	2	3	4	5	6	7	8	9	10	11	12	13	14	15	16	17	18	19	20	21	22	23	24	25	26	27	28	29	30	31	32	33	34
Sepahan	D	D	D	W	L	W	L	W	D	W	W	D	W	D	W	W	W	D	D	W	D	W	W	D	W	W	W	W	L	W	D	W	D	L
Esteghlal	W	L	D	D	W	D	W	D	W	D	W	D	W	L	W	W	W	D	L	L	W	W	W	D	D	D	W	W	L	W	W	D	W	W
Zob Ahan	W	W	D	W	W	L	W	W	D	D	W	L	D	W	D	W	W	D	W	W	L	L	W	W	D	D	W	L	L	W	L	D	W	W
Persepolis	W	L	W	W	W	W	D	D	D	L	L	W	W	W	L	L	L	L	L	W	W	D	W	W	W	D	L	L	W	W	W	D	D	W
Tractor Sazi	L	W	D	L	D	W	W	L	D	W	D	D	L	W	D	D	W	W	W	W	D	W	L	W	D	W	D	D	W	L	W	L	D	W
Foolad	L	W	D	W	D	L	D	D	W	L	D	D	W	L	D	D	W	L	W	L	W	D	W	L	W	W	D	D	W	L	W	D	W	W
Mes Kerman	L	L	L	W	D	W	D	D	D	W	W	D	W	W	W	D	W	D	L	W	L	W	L	D	D	L	D	L	W	D	W	D	W	D
Malavan	D	D	W	D	L	L	W	L	W	W	L	D	D	W	D	L	L	D	D	L	W	D	W	L	W	W	W	W	L	W	L	L	L	W
Sanat Naft	W	W	W	L	L	W	L	D	L	W	L	W	L	W	L	W	L	W	L	L	L	D	L	W	L	W	L	W	L	W	L	L	D	L
Saba Qom	L	W	D	W	D	D	L	W	L	D	D	W	L	D	D	L	W	D	W	L	W	D	W	L	L	D	L	D	L	D	D	W	D	L
Saipa	W	L	L	L	W	L	D	W	L	L	W	D	D	L	L	D	L	D	W	L	W	D	D	W	L	D	D	D	L	D	L	D	D	W
Sh. Tabriz	L	L	D	L	W	D	L	L	D	W	L	D	D	D	D	W	L	D	W	L	W	D	L	L	L	D	D	W	W	L	D	D	W	L
Naft Tehran	D	W	D	L	D	D	D	W	D	L	D	L	D	L	W	D	D	D	L	D	L	W	L	D	W	L	D	D	W	D	L	L	L	W
Shahin Bushehr	L	W	D	L	D	L	W	L	L	D	W	D	L	D	L	D	D	L	W	W	D	L	L	D	W	D	D	D	W	W	D	D	L	L
Rah Ahan	D	L	L	L	L	W	L	W	D	W	W	W	L	W	L	D	L	D	L	W	L	D	D	D	L	D	D	L	L	L	D	W	L	D
PAS Hamedan	W	L	W	W	D	L	D	D	W	L	L	L	D	L	D	D	L	D	D	L	D	L	L	L	L	D	W	W	W	L	W	D	L	L
Paykan	L	L	L	D	L	W	W	L	L	L	L	L	W	L	W	D	W	D	L	W	L	L	D	W	L	L	D	L	W	L	L	D	W	L
Steel Azin	W	W	D	D	D	L	L	L	W	L	L	D	L	L	D	L	L	W	D	D	L	L	D	L	W	L	L	D	L	L	D	W	L	L

Source: IPL Stats
W = Win; D = Draw; L = Lose

== Statistics ==
=== Top goalscorers ===
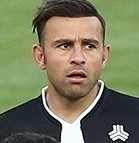
Reza Norouzi

Position	Player	Club	Goals
1	(Iran) Reza Norouzi	Foolad	24
2	(Brazil) Edinho	Mes Kerman	22
3	(Iran) Karim Ansarifard	Saipa	19
4	(Senegal) Ibrahima Touré	Sepahan	18
5	(Iran) Saeed Daghighi	Sh. Tabriz	14
5	(Iran) Arash Borhani	Esteghlal	14
5	(Iran) Mehrdad Oladi	Malavan	14
8	(Iran) Rouhollah Arab	Sanat Naft	13
8	(Iran) Seyed Mohammad Hosseini	Zob Ahan	13
10	(Iran) Arash Afshin	Foolad	11
11	(Brazil) Josiesley Ferreira Rosa	Naft Tehran	10
11	(Iran) Farhad Majidi	Esteghlal	10
13	(Iran) Siavash Akbarpour	Steel Azin	9
13	(Iran) Ali Alizadeh	Tractor Sazi	9
13	(Iran) Mohammad Gholami	Steel Azin	9
13	(Iran) Mohammad Nouri	Persepolis	9
17	9 players		8
26	4 players		7
30	4 players		6
34	19 players		5
53	19 players		4
72	18 players		3
90	41 players		2
131	83 players		1
_	11 players ^{1}		OG
_	technical loses of 3–0		0
Total goals (Including technical loses)			742
Total games			306
Average per game			2.42

^{1} Saeed Salarzadeh from Malavan 2 owne goals.
Last updated: 26 May 2011
Source: IPL Stats

=== Cards ===
Position	Player	Club	Yellow card	Yellow card Red card	Red card	Total
1	(Iran) Davoud Haghi	Saba Qom	10	0	2	12
1	(Iran) Milad Fakhreddini	Mes Kerman	11	1	0	12
3	(Iran) Mohammad Khalatbari	Zob Ahan	11	0	0	11
4	(Iran) Nader Ahmadi	PAS Hamedan	9	0	1	10
4	(Iran) Abdullah Karami	Shahin Bushehr	7	1	2	10
4	(Iran) Mehrdad Pouladi	Mes Kerman	9	0	1	10
4	(Iran) Amir Hossein Sadeghi	Esteghlal	10	0	0	10
8	(Iran) Alireza Abbasfard	Paykan	7	0	2	9
8	(Iran) Mohamad Ali Ahmadi	Zob Ahan	8	0	1	9
8	(Iran) Ghasem Dehnavi	Mes Kerman	7	1	1	9
8	(Iran) Ghasem Hadadifar	Zob Ahan	8	1	0	9
8	(Brazil) Márcio José	Naft Tehran	9	0	0	9
8	(Iran) Alireza Mirshafian	Saba Qom	8	1	0	9
14	9 player		-	-	-	8
23	18 player		-	-	-	7
41	17 player		-	-	-	6
68	36 player		-	-	-	5
104	40 player		-	-	-	4
144	62 player		-	-	-	3
206	67 player		-	-	-	2
273	90 player		-	-	-	1
Total Cards			1157	35	48	1240

Last updated: 25 May 2011
Source: IPL stats

=== Matches played ===
Position	Player	Club	Appearance
1	(Iran) Morteza Asadi	Tractor Sazi	34
1	(Iran) Hossein Ashena	Naft Tehran	34
1	(Iran) Ali Hamoudi	Foolad	34
4	(Iran) Pirouz Ghorbani	Mes Kerman	33
4	(Iran) Shahab Gordan	Zob Ahan	33
4	(Iran) Mohammad Nosrati	Tractor Sazi	33
7	(Iran) Pejman Montazeri	Esteghlal	32
7	(Iran) Pejman Noori	Malavan	32
7	(Iran) Mehdi Rahmati	Sepahan	32

Last updated: 25 May 2011
Source: IPL stats

== Attendances ==
=== Average home attendances ===
Pos	Team	Total	High	Low	Average	Change
1	Tractor Sazi	630,000	90,000	0	42,000	−27.1%
2	Esteghlal	427,000	100,000	2,000	25,118	−21.2%
3	Persepolis	376,000	70,000	0	23,500	−41.2%
4	Sanat Naft	212,000	15,000	0	14,133	n/a
5	Shahin Bushehr	205,000	20,000	3,000	12,059	−17.0%
6	Malavan	130,000	15,000	4,000	7,647	−27.8%
7	Sh. Tabriz	122,000	40,000	0	7,625	n/a
8	Foolad	92,000	12,000	1,000	5,412	+13.6%
8	Sepahan	92,000	15,000	3,000	5,412	−28.7%
10	Mes Kerman	89,000	15,000	2,000	5,235	−11.9%
11	PAS Hamedan	77,000	15,000	1,000	4,529	+16.7%
12	Steel Azin	67,000	35,000	1,000	3,941	−31.6%
13	Rah Ahan	62,000	40,000	1,000	3,647	−32.6%
14	Zob Ahan	58,000	10,000	1,000	3,412	−30.9%
15	Saipa	56,000	20,000	1,000	3,294	−39.8%
16	Naft Tehran	47,000	25,000	1,000	2,765	n/a
17	Saba Qom	40,000	10,000	1,000	2,353	−44.4%
18	Paykan	33,000	7,000	1,000	1,941	−16.1%
	League total	2,815,000	100,000	0	9,383	−23.7%

Updated to games played on 20 May 2011
Source: iplstats.com
Notes:
Matches with spectator bans are not included in average attendances
Naft Tehran, Sanat Naft and Shahrdari Tabriz played last season in Azadegan League

=== Highest attendances ===
Rank	Home team	Score	Away team	Attendance	Date	Week	Stadium
1	Esteghlal	1–0	Persepolis	100,000	15 October 2010	11	Azadi
2	Tractor Sazi	1–3	Sepahan	90,000	15 April 2011	30	Sahand
3	Esteghlal	4–3	Sepahan	70,000	27 August 2010	7	Azadi
3	Tractor Sazi	1–2	Zob Ahan	70,000	10 September 2010	8	Sahand
3	Tractor Sazi	1–1	Esteghlal	70,000	24 October 2010	12	Sahand
3	Persepolis	0–1	Esteghlal	70,000	25 March 2011	28	Azadi
7	Tractor Sazi	2–0	Malavan	60,000	23 August 2010	6	Sahand
7	Tractor Sazi	1–0	Persepolis	60,000	9 December 2010	18	Sahand
7	Tractor Sazi	1–1	Foolad	60,000	30 March 2011	28	Sahand
10	Tractor Sazi	3–0	Steel Azin	55,000	25 February 2011	24	Sahand

Notes:
Updated to games played on 20 May 2011. Source: iplstats.com

== See also ==
- 2010–11 Azadegan League
- 2010–11 Iran Football's 2nd Division
- 2010–11 Iran Football's 3rd Division
- 2010–11 Hazfi Cup
- Iranian Super Cup
- 2010–11 Iranian Futsal Super League

=== Team season articles ===
- 2010–11 Persepolis
- 2010–11 Foolad
