= Hossein Ashena =

Iranian footballer

Hossein Ashna
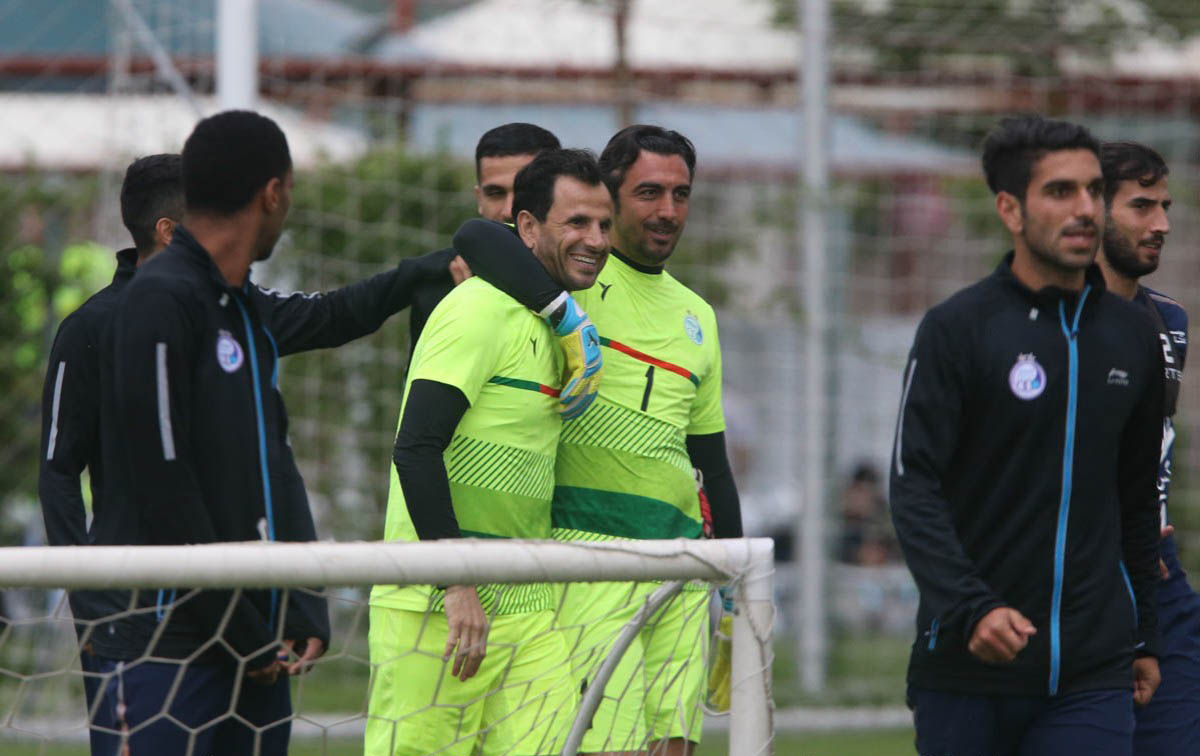

Personal information
- Full name: Hossein Ashna
- Date of birth: 8 August 1980 (age 46)
- Place of birth: Iran, Tehran
- Position: Goalkeeper

Youth career
- 2000–2004: Fajr Sepasi

Senior career*
| Years | Team | Apps | (Gls) |
| 2003–2006 | Fajr Sepasi | 65 | (0) |
| 2006–2008 | Paykan | 25 | (0) |
| 2008–2009 | Rah Ahan | 22 | (0) |
| 2009–2010 | Foolad | 31 | (0) |
| 2010–2011 | Naft Tehran | 34 | (0) |
| 2011–2012 | Saipa | 6 | (0) |
| 2013–2016 | Paykan | 25 | (0) |
| 2013–2014 | → Sanat Naft (loan) | 20 | (0) |
| 2016–2018 | Aluminium Hormozgan | 32 | (0) |
- * Club domestic league appearances and goals as of 10 May 2013

Hossein Ashna (born 8 August 1980) is an Iranian professional soccer player and coach

== Club career ==
Ashena joined Foolad in 2009 after spending the previous season at Rah Ahan.

=== Club career statistics ===
Last Update 10 May 2013

| Club performance | | | League | | Cup | | Continental | | Total | |
| Season | Club | League | Apps | Goals | Apps | Goals | Apps | Goals | Apps | Goals |
| Iran | | | League | | Hazfi Cup | | Asia | | Total | |
|---|---|---|---|---|---|---|---|---|---|---|
| 2003–04 | Fajr | Pro League | 13 | 0 | | 0 | - | - | | 0 |
| 2004–05 | Fajr | Pro League | 28 | 0 | | 0 | - | - | | 0 |
| 2005–06 | Fajr | Pro League | 24 | 0 | | 0 | - | - | | 0 |
| 2006–07 | Paykan | Pro League | 1 | 0 | | 0 | - | - | | 0 |
| 2007–08 | Paykan | Pro League | 24 | 0 | 1 | 0 | - | - | 25 | 0 |
| 2008–09 | Rah Ahan | Pro League | 22 | 0 | | 0 | - | - | | 0 |
| 2009–10 | Foolad | Pro League | 31 | 0 | 0 | 0 | - | - | 31 | 0 |
| 2010–11 | Naft Tehran | Pro League | 34 | 0 | | 0 | - | - | | 0 |
| 2011–12 | Saipa | Pro League | 6 | 0 | 0 | 0 | - | - | 6 | 0 |
| Career total | | | 183 | 0 | | 0 | 0 | 0 | | 0 |
