= Reza Ma'ghouli =

Iranian footballer

Personal information
- Date of birth: 23 September 1984 (age 42)
- Place of birth: Karaj, Iran
- Height: 1.87 m (6 ft 2 in)
- Position: Midfielder

Team information
- Current team: Sepidrood

Senior career*
Years	Team	Apps	(Gls)
2007–2008	Niroye Zamini	?	(1)
2008–2009	Rah Ahan	4	(0)
2009–2010	Esteghlal Ahvaz	31	(3)
2010–2011	Foolad	20	(2)
2011–2012	Naft Tehran	22	(3)
2012–2013	Paykan	22	(1)
2013–2014	Aluminium Hormozgan	17	(2)
2014–2015	Shahrdari Tabriz	19	(3)
2015–2016	Shahdari Ardabil		(4)
2016–2017	Aluminium Arak		(1)
2017	Rah Ahan		(1)
2017–2018	Khooneh be Khooneh		(1)
2018	Sepidrood	5	(0)
2018–	Aluminium Arak		
- * Club domestic league appearances and goals as of 4 September 2018

Reza Ma'ghouli (Persian: رضا معقولی, pronounced [ɾezɒː mæʔɢuːliː]; born 23 September 1984) is an Iranian footballer who plays for Naft Tehran in the Iran's Premier Football League.

== Club career ==
Ma'ghouli joined Esteghlal Ahvaz F.C. in 2009.

== Career statistics ==
As of 8 August 2011

Club performance			League		Cup		Continental		Total	
Season	Club	League	Apps	Goals	Apps	Goals	Apps	Goals	Apps	Goals
Iran			League		Hazfi Cup		Asia		Total	
2007–08	Niroye Zamini	Azadegan		1			-	-		
2008–09	Rah Ahan	Persian Gulf Cup	4	0			-	-		
2009–10	Esteghlal Ahvaz	Persian Gulf Cup	31	3		0	-	-		3
2010–11	Foolad	Persian Gulf Cup	9	0	0	0	-	-	9	0
2011–12	Naft Tehran	Persian Gulf Cup	22	1	0	0	-	-	22	1
Career total				4			0	0		
