= Jaba Mujiri =

Georgian footballer

Personal information
- Full name: Jaba Mujiri
- Date of birth: 7 June 1980 (age 46)
- Place of birth: Tbilisi, Georgia
- Height: 1.85 m (6 ft 1 in)
- Position: Defender

Youth career
- 1998–2000: Tbilisi State University

Senior career*
Years	Team	Apps	(Gls)
2000–2005	WIT Georgia	148	(8)
2005–2008	Sepahan	55	(1)
2008	Sioni Bolnisi		
2009–2012	Foolad	55	(1)

International career
	Georgia U-21	6	(0)
- * Club domestic league appearances and goals as of 14 March 2012

Jaba Mujiri (Georgian: ჯაბა მუჯირი; born 7 June 1980 in Tbilisi) is a Georgian football player who most recently plays for Foolad F.C. in the Iran Pro League before being fired from team. He usually plays in the defender position.

== Club career ==
He returned to Iran for 2009–10 season to play for Foolad and was one of the regular players of the team.

=== Club career statistics ===
Last Update 14 March 2012

Club performance			League		Cup		Continental		Total	
Season	Club	League	Apps	Goals	Apps	Goals	Apps	Goals	Apps	Goals
Iran			League		Hazfi Cup		Asia		Total	
2005–06	Sepahan	Pro League	22	1			-	-		
2006–07	Sepahan	Pro League	20	0				0		
2007–08	Sepahan	Pro League	13	0		0	1	0		0
2009–10	Foolad	Pro League	24	1	1	0	-	-	25	1
2010–11	Foolad	Pro League	24	0	2	0	-	-	26	0
2011–12	Foolad	Pro League	7	0	0	0	-	-	7	0
Career total			110	2				0		

- Assist Goals

Season	Team	Assists
07–08	Sepahan	1
10–11	Foolad	0
11-12	Foolad	0

== Awards and honours ==
- Georgian championship: 1
  - 2003/04, FC WIT Georgia
- Iranian Cup: 2
  - 2005/06, Sepahan
  - 2006/07, Sepahan
