= Mohammad Reza Niknahal =

Iranian footballer

Personal information
- Full name: Mohammad Reza Niknahal
- Date of birth: 23 June 1985 (age 41)
- Place of birth: Iran
- Position: Striker

Youth career
- Fajr

Senior career*
| Years | Team | Apps | (Gls) |
| 2006–2007 | Pegah Tehran | 18 | (7) |
| 2007–2008 | Bargh | 22 | (15) |
| 2008–2012 | Naft Tehran | 62 | (42) |
| 2012–2013 | Pas | 21 | (13) |
| 2013–2014 | Foolad | 22 | (11) |
| 2014–2015 | Payam | 19 | (15) |
| 2015–2016 | Oxin | 21 | (17) |
| 2016–2017 | Kheybar | 0 | (0) |
| 2017–2018 | Sanaye Talaei | 10 | (5) |
| 2018– | Rah Ahan | 15 | (8) |
- * Club domestic league appearances and goals as of 10 May 2013

Mohammad Reza Niknahal is an Iranian footballer who plays for Naft Tehran in the Iranian Premier League.
