= Abolfazl Bahadorani =

Iranian footballer

Personal information
- Full name: Abolfazl Bahadorani
- Date of birth: August 23, 1978 (age 48)
- Place of birth: Iran
- Height: 1.85 m (6 ft 1 in)
- Position: Goalkeeper

Team information
- Current team: Foolad Novin
- Number: 1

Senior career*
Years	Team	Apps	(Gls)
2009–2010	Foolad	2	(0)
2010–2014	Naft Masjed Soleyman	35	(0)
2014–	Foolad Novin	8	(0)
- * Club domestic league appearances and goals as of 3 January 2015

Abolfazl Bahadorani (Persian: ابوالفضل بهادرانی, born 23 August 1978, is an Iranian football goalkeeper who plays for Azadegan League club Foolad Novin. He was signed to Foolad F.C. starting in the season opener in August 2009 but had to leave injured during the first half. He was released by Foolad in July 2010, but has since returned to their reserve side Foolad Novin.
