= Amir Khodamoradi =

Iranian football player (born 1983)

Personal information
- Full name: Amir Khodamoradi
- Date of birth: September 21, 1983 (age 43)
- Place of birth: Sanandaj, Iran
- Position: Midfielder

Team information
- Current team: Mes Rafsanjan

Youth career
- Malavan

Senior career*
Years	Team	Apps	(Gls)
2004–2009	Malavan	113	(8)
2009–2010	Foolad	15	(1)
2010–2013	Shahrdari Bandar Abbas	65	(6)
2013–2014	Mes Rafsanjan	19	(1)
2014–2015	Naft Gachsaran	21	(4)
2015–	Mes Rafsanjan	1	(0)
- * Club domestic league appearances and goals as of 20 August 2015

Amir Khodamoradi (born September 21, 1982) is an Iranian football player, who currently plays for Shahrdari Bandar Abbas of the Azadegan League

== Club career ==
Khodamoradi joined Foolad in 2009 after spending the previous season at Malavan F.C.

=== Club career statistics ===
As of 19 Aug 2013

Club performance			League		Cup		Total	
Season	Club	League	Apps	Goals	Apps	Goals	Apps	Goals
Iran			League		Hazfi Cup		Total	
2004–05	Malavan	Pro League	13	0				
2005–06	Malavan	Pro League	14	0				
2006–07	Malavan	Pro League	29	5				
2007–08	Malavan	Pro League	32	3	1	0	33	3
2008–09	Malavan	Pro League	25	0				
2009–10	Foolad	Pro League	15	1				
2010–11	Bandar Abbas	Division 1	23	1				
2011–12	Bandar Abbas	Division 1	24	3	–	–	24	3
2012–13	Bandar Abbas	Division 1	18	2	–	–	18	2
Total	Iran		193	15				
Career total			186	15				

- Assist Goals

Season	Team	Assists
09–10	Foolad	0
