= Sajjad Feizollahi =

Iranian footballer

Sajad Feyzollahi
Personal information
- Full name: Sajad Feyzollahi
- Date of birth: 21 September 1987 (age 39)
- Place of birth: Ahvaz, Iran
- Position: Forward

Team information
- Current team: Iranjavan

Youth career
- 2002–2007: Foolad

Senior career*
Years	Team	Apps	(Gls)
2007–2010	Foolad	45	(11)
2010–2012	Naft Tehran	17	(2)
2012–2013	Paykan	33	(4)
2013–2014	Naft Masjed Soleyman	14	(1)
2015–	Daleron-Uroteppa		
2015–	Iranjavan		
- * Club domestic league appearances and goals as of 21 October 2015

Sajad Feyzollahi (Persian: سجاد فیض اللهی; born September 21, 1987) is an Iranian footballer who plays for Iranjavan in the Azadegan League.

== Club career ==
Feizollahi played with Foolad until 2010. In 2010, he joined Naft Tehran.

=== Club career statistics ===
Club performance			League		Cup		Continental		Total	
Season	Club	League	Apps	Goals	Apps	Goals	Apps	Goals	Apps	Goals
Iran			League		Hazfi Cup		Asia		Total	
2008–09	Foolad	Pro League	26	9			–	–		
2009–10	Foolad	Pro League	19	2		0	–	–		2
2010–11	Naft Tehran	Pro League	17	2			–	–		
2011–12	Naft Tehran	Pro League	0	0	0	0	–	–	0	0
2011–12	Paykan	Division 1	10	3	0	0	–	–	10	3
2012–13	Paykan	Pro League	23	1			–	–		
2013–14	Naft MIS	Division 1	14	1	0	0	–	–	14	1
Career total			61	11			0	0		

- Assist Goals

Season	Team	Assists
2010–11	Naft Tehran	0
