= Nader Ahmadi =

Iranian footballer

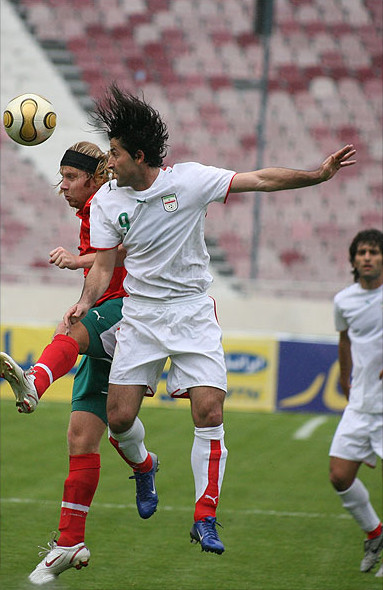

Personal information
- Full name: Nader Ahmadi
- Date of birth: September 12, 1986 (age 40)
- Place of birth: Iran
- Position: Midfielder

Youth career
- Foolad

Senior career*
Years	Team	Apps	(Gls)
2004–2012	Foolad	87	(10)
2006–2007	→ PAS Tehran (loan)	12	(0)
2010–2012	→ PAS Hamedan (loan)	5	(0)
2012–2013	Paykan	0	(0)
- * Club domestic league appearances and goals as of 3 September 2010

Nader Ahmadi (born September 12, 1986) is an Iranian footballer, who played for Paykan of the Iran's Premier Football League.

== Professional ==
Ahmadi joined Foolad in 2007 after spending the previous season at Pas Tehran F.C.

=== Club Career Statistics ===
Last Update 3 September 2010

Club performance			League		Cup		Continental		Total	
Season	Club	League	Apps	Goals	Apps	Goals	Apps	Goals	Apps	Goals
Iran			League		Hazfi Cup		Asia		Total	
2004–05	Foolad	Persian Gulf Cup	17	2			-	-		
2005–06	Foolad	Persian Gulf Cup	22	4				1		
2006–07	Pas	Persian Gulf Cup	12	0			-	-		
2007–08	Foolad	Azadegan League	20	2			-	-		
2008–09	Foolad	Persian Gulf Cup	24	2	2	0	-	-	26	2
2009–10	Foolad	Persian Gulf Cup	20	2		0	-	-		2
2010–11	Pas	Persian Gulf Cup	5	0	0	0	-	-	5	0
Total	Iran			10				1		
Career total				10				1		

- Assist Goals

Season	Team	Assists
09–10	Foolad	2
10–11	Pas	0
