= Siamak Sarlak =

Iranian footballer

Personal information
- Full name: Siamak Sarlak
- Date of birth: 8 September 1985 (age 41)
- Place of birth: Bandar Abbas, Iran
- Position: Midfielder

Team information
- Current team: Sanat Naft Abadan

Senior career*
Years	Team	Apps	(Gls)
2005–2011	Foolad		(12)
2011–2012	Damash	2	(0)
2012	Tractor Sazi	0	(0)
2012–2013	Gahar Zagros	0	(0)
2013–	Sanat Naft Abadan	0	(0)
- * Club domestic league appearances and goals as of 3 August 2011 ‡ National team caps and goals as of 09:49, 13 February 2010 (UTC)

Siamak Sarlak is an Iranian footballer who currently plays for Gahar Zagros in the Iran Pro League.

== Club career ==
Sarlak has been with Foolad F.C. since 2005. He played for Foolad in the 2006 AFC Champions League group stage.

=== Club career statistics ===
As of 3 August 2011

Club performance			League		Cup		Continental		Total	
Season	Club	League	Apps	Goals	Apps	Goals	Apps	Goals	Apps	Goals
Iran			League		Hazfi Cup		Asia		Total	
2005–06	Foolad	Pro League	23	0				0		
2006–07	Foolad	Pro League	18	0	1	0	-	-	19	0
2007–08	Foolad	Division 1	19				-	-		
2008–09	Foolad	Pro League	31	4	2	0	-	-	33	4
2009–10	Foolad	Pro League	30	4	1	0	-	-	31	4
2010–11	Foolad	Pro League	29	4	3	0	-	-	32	4
2011–12	Damash Gilan	Pro League	2	0	0	0	-	-	2	0
2011–12	Tractor Sazi	Pro League	0	0	0	0	-	-	0	0
Career total				12				0		

- Assist Goals

Season	Team	Assists
06–07	Foolad	1
08–09	Foolad	1
09–10	Foolad	3
10–11	Foolad	2
11-12	Damash Gilan	0
11-12	Tractor Sazi	0
