= Christian Yeladian =

Uruguayan footballer (born 1983)

Personal information
- Full name: Christian Apraham Yeladián Camejo
- Date of birth: 17 September 1983 (age 43)
- Place of birth: Montevideo, Uruguay
- Height: 1.75 m (5 ft 9 in)
- Position: Midfielder

Team information
- Current team: Bella Vista

Youth career
- Bella Vista

Senior career*
Years	Team	Apps	(Gls)
2004–2006	Bella Vista	3	(0)
2006	Técnico Universitario	1	(0)
2007	Bella Vista	23	(1)
2008	Montevideo Wanderers	5	(0)
2008–2009	Juventud	21	(4)
2009–2010	Foolad	4	(0)
2010–2011	Juventude	7	(0)
2011–2012	Danubio	17	(1)
2012–2013	Rentistas	23	(5)
2013–2014	Boston River	11	(4)
2014–2015	Alianza FC	33	(4)
2015–2016	Pérez Zeledón	23	(3)
2016	AD Carmelita	11	(1)
2017–2019	Cerrito	70	(16)
2020–2021	Albion	40	(4)
2022-	Bella Vista	0	(0)
- * Club domestic league appearances and goals as of 23:52, 25 April 2022 (UTC)

Christian Apraham Yeladián Camejo (born 17 September 1983) is a Uruguayan footballer of Armenian origins who plays as a midfielder for Bella Vista.

== Club career ==
Yeladian has played for C.A. Bella Vista, Montevideo Wanderers and Juventud in the Uruguayan Primera División.

In mid-2009 he was transferred to Iran Pro League side Foolad.

In August 2010, he signed a new deal with the Brazililian club Esporte Clube Juventude.

On 30 August 2011, he returned to his home land and signed a new contract with Danubio.

== Statistics ==
Club	Season	League	Domestic League		Domestic Cups		Continental Cups		Total	
Club	Season	League	Apps	Goals	Apps	Goals	Apps	Goals	Apps	Goals
Bella Vista	2005	Segunda División	3	0	-	-	-	-	3	0
Técnico Universitario	Clausura 2006	Ecuadorian Serie B	1	0	-	-	-	–	1	0
Bella Vista	Clausura 2007	Primera División	11	0	5	0	-	–	16	0
Bella Vista	Apertura 2007	Primera División	12	1	-	-	-	–	12	1
Montevideo Wanderers	Clausura 2008	Primera División	5	0	-	-	1	0	6	0
Juventud	2008-09	Primera División	21	4	-	-	-	-	21	4
Foolad	2009-10	Persian Gulf Cup	4	0	-	-	-	-	4	0
Juventude	2010-11	Série C	7	0	8	-	-	-	15	0
Danubio	2011-12	Primera División	6	0	-	-	-	-	6	0
Total	Career		70	5	13	0	1	0	84	5
