= Reza Norouzi =

Iranian footballer

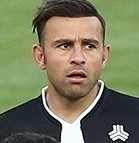

Personal information
- Full name: Reza Norouzi
- Date of birth: 21 September 1982 (age 44)
- Place of birth: Ahvaz, Iran
- Height: 1.88 m (6 ft 2 in)
- Position: Forward

College career
| Years | Team | Apps | (Gls) |
| 2006–2007 | Azad University | | |

Senior career*
| Years | Team | Apps | (Gls) |
| 2007–2008 | Bargh Shiraz | 10 | (2) |
| 2008–2010 | Steel Azin | 48 | (14) |
| 2010–2012 | Foolad | 50 | (36) |
| 2012–2014 | Naft Tehran | 35 | (13) |
| 2014–2015 | Persepolis | 4 | (1) |
| 2015 | Saipa | 11 | (1) |
| 2015–2016 | Paykan | 12 | (4) |
| 2016–2017 | Sanat Naft | 18 | (2) |

International career^{‡}
| 2010–2012 | Iran | 6 | (0) |
- * Club domestic league appearances and goals as of 16 September 2014 ‡ National team caps and goals as of 3 March 2014

Reza Norouzi (Persian: رضا نوروزی, born 21 September 1982) is a retired Iranian footballer.

== Club career ==
=== Early years ===
Norouzi started his career with Bargh Shiraz in Iran Pro League.

=== Steel Azin ===
Norouzi joined Steel Azin in 2008 after spending the previous year at Bargh Shiraz.

=== Foolad ===
He was transferred to Foolad on 2010 and became top goal scorer of 2010–11 season.

=== Naft Tehran ===
In October 2012, Norouzi signed with Naft Tehran effective from January 2013. He scored his first goal for Naft in his debut match against Malavan. In his second season with the club he finished the season with 11 goals, one of the most in the league.

=== Persepolis ===
After becoming the Pro League's third place with Naft Tehran that was the club's best season in its history, Norouzi had offers from many teams, however, he joined Persepolis in the summer of 2014 and signed a one-year contract until end of 2014–15 season. Persepolis fans nicknamed him as the Blue Killer, because he has scored nine goals against Esteghlal in three previous seasons. He played his first official game for Persepolis against his former team, Naft Tehran on 1 August 2014. He was substituted in 90+2 minutes with Mehdi Taremi.

=== Club career statistics ===
As of 20 August 2014

| Club | Division | Season | League | | Hazfi Cup | | Asia | | Total | |
| Club | Division | Season | Apps | Goals | Apps | Goals | Apps | Goals | Apps | Goals |
|---|---|---|---|---|---|---|---|---|---|---|
| Bargh | Pro League | 2007–08 | 10 | 2 | 0 | 0 | – | – | 10 | 2 |
| Steel Azin | Division 1 | 2008–09 | 21 | 8 | 0 | 0 | – | – | 21 | 8 |
| Steel Azin | Pro League | 2009–10 | 27 | 6 | 0 | 0 | – | – | 27 | 6 |
| Foolad | Pro League | 2010–11 | 29 | 24 | 3 | 1 | – | – | 32 | 25 |
| Foolad | Pro League | 2011–12 | 22 | 10 | 1 | 0 | – | – | 23 | 10 |
| Naft Tehran | Pro League | 2012–13 | 9 | 2 | 0 | 0 | – | – | 9 | 2 |
| Naft Tehran | Pro League | 2013–14 | 23 | 11 | 1 | 0 | – | – | 24 | 11 |
| Persepolis | Pro League | 2014–15 | 4 | 1 | 0 | 0 | 0 | 0 | 4 | 1 |
| Career total | | | 145 | 67 | 5 | 1 | 0 | 0 | 150 | 68 |

- Assist Goals

| Season | Team | Assists |
|---|---|---|
| 09–10 | Steel Azin | 2 |
| 10–11 | Foolad | 2 |
| 11–12 | Foolad | 3 |
| 12–13 | Naft Tehran | 4 |
| 13–14 | Naft Tehran | 2 |
| 14–15 | Persepolis | 0 |

== International career ==
He started his international career under Afshin Ghotbi in November 2010 against Nigeria. He also played for Iran in the 2011 AFC Asian Cup. He was selected in Iran's 30-man provisional squad for the 2014 FIFA World Cup by Carlos Queiroz.

== Honours ==
=== Individual ===
- Iranian Footballer of the Year: 2010
- Iran Pro League Top Goalscorer: 2010–11
