= Saeed Ramezani =

Iranian footballer

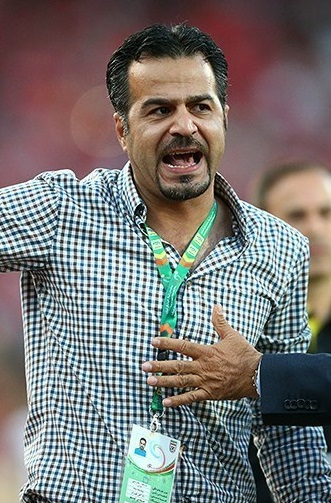

Personal information
- Full name: Saeid Ramezani
- Date of birth: August 16, 1976 (age 50)
- Place of birth: Kermanshah, Iran
- Position: Midfielder

Youth career
- 1999–2001: Zob Ahan

Senior career*
Years	Team	Apps	(Gls)
2001–2002	Zob Ahan	25	(1)
2002–2005	Sepahan	45	(5)
2005–2008	Esteghlal Ahvaz	55	(6)
2008–2012	Foolad	70	(12)

Managerial career
- 2015: Siah Jamegan (caretaker)
- 2015: Rah Ahan (manager)
- 2020: Esteghlal (manager)
- * Club domestic league appearances and goals

Saeid Ramezani (born August 16, 1976) is an Iranian retired football player. He is the son-in-law of Nasser Hejazi.

== Club career ==
Ramezani joined Foolad in 2008 after spending the previous three seasons at Esteghlal Ahvaz.

=== Club Career Statistics ===
Last Update 13 December 2012

Club performance			League		Cup		Continental		Total	
Season	Club	League	Apps	Goals	Apps	Goals	Apps	Goals	Apps	Goals
Iran			League		Hazfi Cup		Asia		Total	
2001–02	Zob Ahan	Persian Gulf Cup	25	1			-	-		
2002–03	Sepahan	Persian Gulf Cup	20	1			-	-		
2003–04	Sepahan	Persian Gulf Cup	15	2				0		
2004–05	Sepahan	Persian Gulf Cup	10	2				0		
2005–06	Esteghlal Ahvaz	Persian Gulf Cup	15	1			-	-		
2006–07	Esteghlal Ahvaz	Persian Gulf Cup	22	2			-	-		
2007–08	Esteghlal Ahvaz	Persian Gulf Cup	18	3			-	-		
2008–09	Foolad	Persian Gulf Cup	27	7			-	-		
2009–10	Foolad	Persian Gulf Cup	33	5	1	0	-	-	34	5
2010–11	Foolad	Persian Gulf Cup	10	0	1	0	-	-	11	0
2011–12	Foolad	Persian Gulf Cup	0	0	0	0	-	-	0	0
Total	Iran			24				0		
Career total				24				0		

- Assist Goals

Season	Team	Assists
09–10	Foolad	1
10–11	Foolad	0
