= Takhti Stadium (Ahvaz) =

Stadium in Ahvaz, Iran

Coordinates: 31°18′52″N 48°39′54″E

Takhti Stadium ورزشگاه تختی
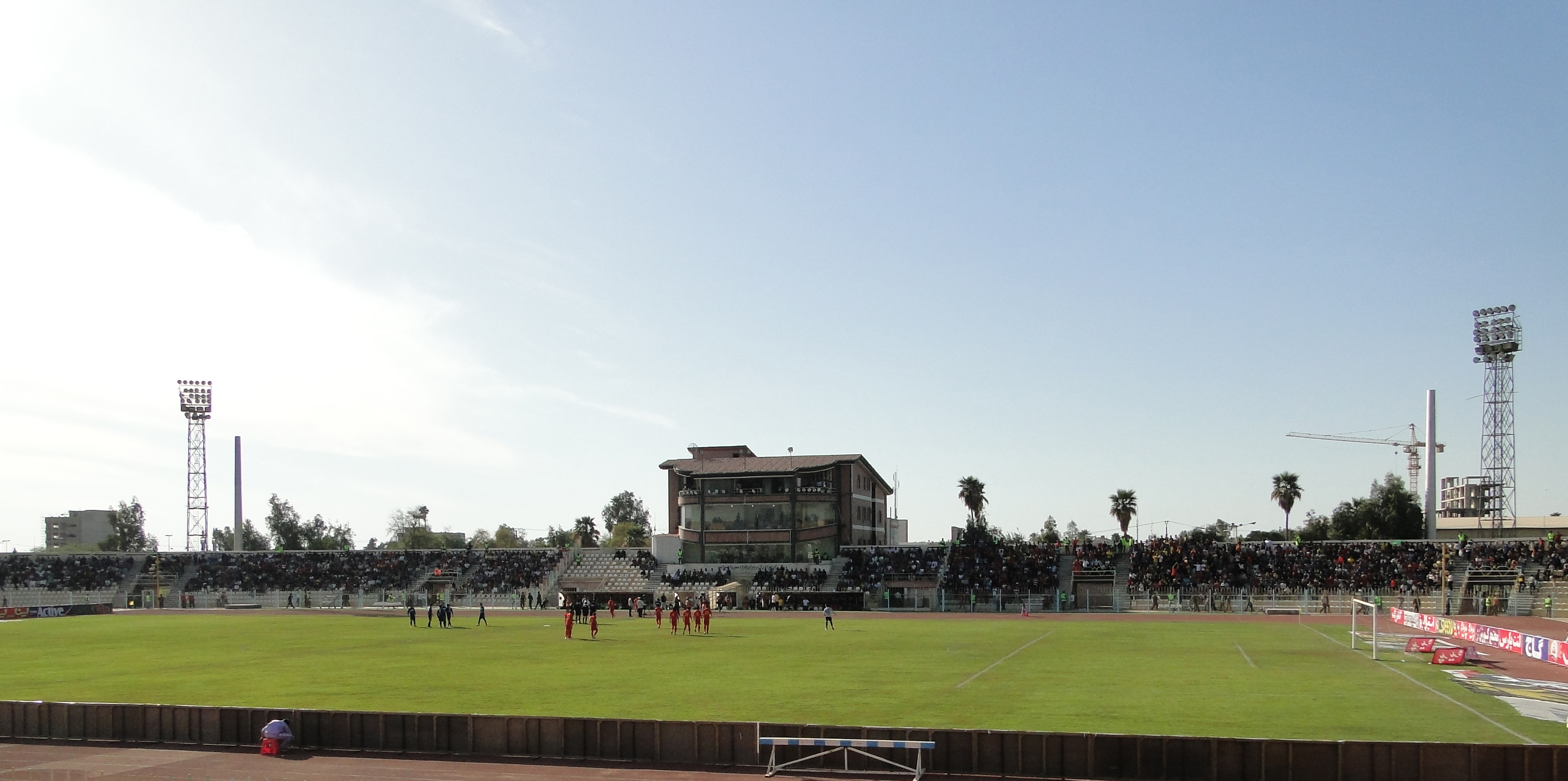
- Interactive map of Takhti Stadium ورزشگاه تختی
- Full name: Takhti Stadium of Ahvaz
- Location: Ahvaz, Iran
- Operator: Municipality of Ahvaz
- Capacity: 15,000
- Surface: Grass

Construction
- Built: 1978
- Opened: 1984
- Renovated: 2005, 2012

Tenants
- Foolad (2006–2012); Esteghlal Khuzestan (2012–2014); Esteghlal Ahvaz (1984–present)

The Takhti Stadium of Ahvaz (Persian: ورزشگاه تختی اهواز) is a multi-purpose stadium in Ahvaz, Iran. It is currently used mostly for football and rugby matches. The stadium is able to hold 15,000 people. It is currently home venue of Esteghlal Ahvaz.

== History ==
The stadium was built in 1978, there have been many disputes as to the name of Takhti Stadium.

The stadium had been the home of both Esteghlal Ahvaz and Foolad in past years. Foolad was relegated in 2007, they were as such not allowed to play all the matches in this stadium. In 2013 Foolad permanently moved to a much bigger Ghadir Stadium. The stadium was renovated in summer 2012 and then, Esteghlal Khuzestan purchased its rights with a contract until 2014.

== Location ==
The stadium is 6 km from the center of city of Ahvaz.
