= Shahid Beheshti Stadium =

Stadium in Bushehr, Iran

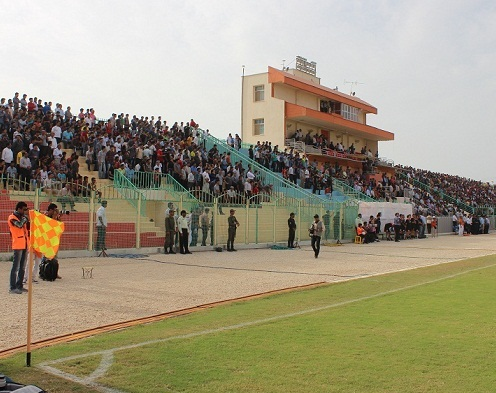
- Full name: Shahid Beheshti Stadium
- Location: Bushehr, Iran
- Owner: Municipality of Bushehr
- Operator: Iranjavan
- Capacity: 15,000 (Football)
- Surface: Grass

Tenant
- Iranjavan

Shahin Bushehr F.C. (Persian: ورزشگاه شهید بهشتی) is a multi-use stadium in Bushehr, Iran. It is currently used for football matches and is the home stadium of Iran Pro League team Iranjavan F.C. The stadium holds 15,000 people.
