= Shahid Rajai Stadium =

Multi-use stadium

Azadegan Qazvin Stadium
- Azadegan Qazvin Stadium
- Full name: Azadegan Qazvin Stadium
- Location: Qazvin, Iran
- Owner: Municipality of Qazvin
- Operator: Caspian Qazvin
- Capacity: 15,000 (Football)
- Surface: Grass

Tenant
- Caspian Qazvin

Shahid Rajai Stadium (Persian: ورزشگاه شهید رجائی) is a multi-use stadium in Qazvin, Iran. It is used for football matches and is home ground of Caspian Qazvin F.C. The stadium holds 15,000 people. It is named after Iran's second president, Mohammad-Ali Rajai, who was from Qazvin.
