= List of Iranian football transfers summer 2012 =

This is a list of Iranian football transfers for the 2012 summer transfer window. Only moves featuring at least one Iran Pro League or Azadegan League club are listed.

Players without a club may join one at any time, either during or in between transfer windows. Clubs can also sign players on loan at any point during the season. If need be, clubs may sign a goalkeeper on an emergency loan, if all others are unavailable.

== Rules and regulations ==
The Iranian Football Clubs who participate in 2012–13 Iran Pro League are allowed to have up to maximum 35 players (including up to maximum 4 non-Iranian players) in their player lists, which will be categorized in the following groups:

- Up to maximum 21 adult (over 23 years old) players
- Up to maximum 6 under-23 players (i.e. the player whose birth is after 21 March 1989).
- Up to maximum 5 under-21 players (i.e. the player whose birth is after 1 January 1992).
- Up to maximum 3 under-19 players (i.e. the player whose birth is after 1 January 1994).

According to Iran Football Federation rules for 2012-13 Football Season, each Football Club is allowed to take up to maximum 7 new Iranian player from the other clubs who already played in the 2011-12 Iran Pro League season. In addition to these seven new player, each club is allowed to take up to maximum 4 non-Iranian new players (at least one of them should be Asian) and up to 2 Iranian player from Free agent (who did not play in 2011-12 Iran Pro League season). In addition to these players, the clubs are also able to take some new under-23, under 21, and under-19 years old players, if they have some free place in these categories in their player lists.

== Iran Pro League ==
=== Aluminium Hormozgan ===
In: Note: Flags indicate national team as defined under FIFA eligibility rules; some limited exceptions apply. Players may hold more than one non-FIFA nationality.

No.	Pos.	Nation	Player
15	DF	SYR	Mohammed Estanbeli (from (Saudi Arabia) Al-Ansar (Medina))
9	MF	IRI	Reza Nasehi (from Sepahan)
2	MF	IRI	Mohsen Hamidi (from Shahin Bushehr)
7	MF	IRI	Amjad Shokuh Magham (from Shahin Bushehr)
13	MF	IRI	Behnam Dadashvand (from Shahrdari Tabriz)
21	MF	IRI	Mehdi Mohammadzadeh (from Shahrdari Tabriz)
24	FW	IRI	Jafar Bazri (from Shahrdari Tabriz)

Out: Note: Flags indicate national team as defined under FIFA eligibility rules; some limited exceptions apply. Players may hold more than one non-FIFA nationality.

No.	Pos.	Nation	Player
—	MF	IRI	Hadi Daghagheleh (to Fajr Sepasi F.C.)
—	FW	IRI	Ali Karimi (to Shahrdari Tabriz)
—	FW	IRI	Bahman Tahmasbi (to Saba Qom)
—	MF	IRI	Abolfazl Ebrahimi (to Saba Qom)
—	DF	IRI	Mohammad Aram Tab (to Saba Qom)
—	MF	IRI	Ahmad Taghavi (to Aboomoslem)

=== Damash Gilan ===
In: Note: Flags indicate national team as defined under FIFA eligibility rules; some limited exceptions apply. Players may hold more than one non-FIFA nationality.

No.	Pos.	Nation	Player
25	DF	IRI	Mojteh Rostami (from Shahrdari Langaroud)
2	DF	IRI	Mohammad Siah (from Free Agent)
6	DF	IRI	Morteza Ebrahimi (from Saipa)
9	MF	IRI	Hadi Sohrabi (from Nasaji)
5	DF	IRI	Masoud Zarei (from Paykan)
4	DF	IRI	Abolfazl Hajizadeh (from Shahrdari Tabriz)
22	MF	IRI	Mehdi Kiani (from Shahin Bushehr)
14	FW	IRI	Amin Motevaselzadeh (from Pas Hamedan)
18	FW	IRI	Reza Almaskhale (from Gahar Zagros)
23	GK	IRI	Hassan Roudbarian (from Rah Ahan)
16	MF	IRI	Rasoul Boroush (from Saba Qom)

Out: Note: Flags indicate national team as defined under FIFA eligibility rules; some limited exceptions apply. Players may hold more than one non-FIFA nationality.

No.	Pos.	Nation	Player
21	DF	IRI	Abouzar Rahimi (to Sanat Naft Abadan F.C.)
28	MF	IRI	Afshin Esmaeilzadeh (to Persepolis)
6	MF	IRI	Jahangir Asgari (to Rah Ahan)
7	MF	IRI	Milad Zeneyedpour (to Sepahan)
9	FW	IRI	Mohammad Gholami (to Sepahan)
22	GK	IRI	Mohammad Mohammadi (to Esteghlal)
14	MF	BRA	Magno (to Naft Tehran)
5	MF	BRA	Orestes Junior Alves (Released)
3	DF	IRI	Ali Hosseini (to Rah Ahan)
4	MF	IRI	Abbas Aghaei (Released)
19	FW	IRI	Farzad Mohammadi (Released)
25	DF	IRI	Milad Nosrati (Released)
—	MF	IRI	Mohammad Karimi (to Iranjavan)

=== Esteghlal ===
In: Note: Flags indicate national team as defined under FIFA eligibility rules; some limited exceptions apply. Players may hold more than one non-FIFA nationality.

No.	Pos.	Nation	Player
17	MF	IRI	Maysam Baou (from Shahrdari Tabriz)
18	DF	IRI	Hashem Beikzadeh (from Sepahan)
11	FW	IRI	Amin Manouchehri (from Saipa)
25	FW	IRI	Mojtaba Mojaz (from Mes Sarcheshme, Loan Return)
4	DF	IRI	Amir Hossein Sadeghi (from Tractor Sazi)
—	MF	IRI	Iman Mobali (from (United Arab Emirates) Al Sharjah)
20	FW	IRI	Siavash Akbarpour (from Tractor Sazi)
—	GK	IRI	Mohammad Mohammadi (from Damash Gilan)
30	MF	ITA	Rodrigo Tosi (from Tractor Sazi)
37	MF	BRA	Fabio Januario (from Sepahan)
22	GK	IRI	Hossein Hosseini (from Bargh Shiraz)
35	GK	IRI	Hadi Rishi Esfahani (from Sepahan)
28	MF	IRI	Mehran Ghasemi (from Steel Azin)
21	DF	IRI	Armen Tahmasian (from Free agent)
—	FW	IRI	Ali Alipour (from Nassaji Mazandaran)
6	MF	IRI	Javad Nekounam (from (Spain) CA Osasuna)
29	GK	AUS	Liam Reddy (from (Australia) Sydney FC)

Out: Note: Flags indicate national team as defined under FIFA eligibility rules; some limited exceptions apply. Players may hold more than one non-FIFA nationality.

No.	Pos.	Nation	Player
22	GK	IRI	Hadi Zarrin-Saed (Released)
4	DF	IRI	Hamid Azizzadeh (Released)
17	MF	CMR	Jacques Elong Elong (Released)
34	MF	IRI	Hossein Alavi (Released)
25	FW	IRI	Mojtaba Mojaz (Released)
3	DF	IRI	Mehdi Amirabadi (to Foolad)
14	MF	IRI	Andranik Teymourian (to (Qatar) Al-Kharitiyath)
31	DF	IRI	Javad Shirzad (to Malavan)
37	FW	IRI	Esmaeil Sharifat (to Foolad)
11	MF	IRI	Mohsen Yousefi (to Saipa)
20	GK	IRI	Mohammad Mohammadi (to Rah Ahan)
23	MF	IRI	Iman Mobali (to Paykan)
36	GK	IRI	Mehdi Eslami (to Gostaresh Foolad)
20	FW	SRB	Goran Jerković (to (Thailand) Buriram United)
29	MF	IRI	Tohid Gholami (to Machine Sazi)

=== Fajr Sepasi ===
In: Note: Flags indicate national team as defined under FIFA eligibility rules; some limited exceptions apply. Players may hold more than one non-FIFA nationality.

No.	Pos.	Nation	Player
20	MF	IRI	Farshid Esmaeili (from Iran U-20)
27	MF	IRI	Hadi Daghagheleh (from Aluminium Hormozgan F.C.)
25	DF	BRA	Diego Benedito Galvão Máximo (from Iranjavan)
32	MF	IRI	Mohammad Reza Jalali (from Gahar Zagros)
17	MF	IRI	Jalaleddin Alimohammadi (from Gostaresh Foolad)
33	DF	IRI	Mojtaba Tarshiz (from Mes Sarcheshmeh)
30	GK	IRI	Mohammad Khazaei (from Mes Sarcheshmeh)
7	FW	IRI	Abbas Mohammad Rezaei (from Saipa)
24	DF	IRI	Jaber Ansari (from Saipa)
8	FW	IRI	Ali Molaei (from Saba Qom)
12	FW	IRI	Babak Latifi (from Shahin)
16	MF	IRI	Ali Reza Latifi (to Saipa)

Out: Note: Flags indicate national team as defined under FIFA eligibility rules; some limited exceptions apply. Players may hold more than one non-FIFA nationality.

No.	Pos.	Nation	Player
30	MF	IRI	Mehdi Rajabzadeh (to Zob Ahan)
8	MF	IRI	Mehrdad Karimian (released, to Mes Kerman F.C.)
1	GK	IRI	Sirous Sangchouli (released)
22	FW	IRI	Younes Shakeri (to Aboomoslem)
20	DF	IRI	Ayoub Kalantari (released)
23	MF	IRI	Javad Zayghami (released)
27	MF	IRI	Vahid Nemati (released)
7	MF	IRI	Mohammed Reza Pourmohammad (released)
17	DF	IRI	Abbas Kazemian (released)

=== Foolad ===
In: Note: Flags indicate national team as defined under FIFA eligibility rules; some limited exceptions apply. Players may hold more than one non-FIFA nationality.

No.	Pos.	Nation	Player
14	FW	IRI	Shahab Karami (from Paykan Youth)
13	MF	ROU	Claudiu Mircea Ionescu (from (Moldova) FC Milsami)
37	FW	IRI	Abbas Pourkhosravani (from Shahin)
5	MF	IRI	Mehdi Noori (from Shahin)
29	FW	BRA	Chimba (from (Brazil) Clube Atlético Linense)
3	DF	IRI	Mehdi Amirabadi (from Esteghlal)
37	FW	IRI	Esmaeil Sharifat (from Esteghlal)
20	DF	BRA	Leandro Padovani Celin (from (Brazil) Volta Redonda)
31	GK	IRI	Ershad Yousefi (from Mes Kerman)

Out: Note: Flags indicate national team as defined under FIFA eligibility rules; some limited exceptions apply. Players may hold more than one non-FIFA nationality.

No.	Pos.	Nation	Player
—	MF	IRI	Omid Khouraj (to Sang Ahan Bafq)
5	DF	IRI	Jalal Kameli Mofrad (to Paykan)
19	FW	IRI	Kaveh Rezaei (to Saipa)
14	MF	IRI	Karim Shaverdi (to Iranjavan)
28	MF	IRI	Abdollah Mombeyni (to Esteghlal Ahvaz)
21	MF	IRI	Omid Khaledi (released)
30	GK	IRI	Saman Safa (Released)
7	MF	BRA	Andrezinho (Released)
29	DF	GEO	Jaba Mujiri (Released)
8	MF	IRI	Mehdi Momeni (to Saba Qom)
8	MF	IRI	Nader Ahmadi (released)
24	DF	IRI	Khalil Taleghani (released)

=== Gahar Zagros ===
In: Note: Flags indicate national team as defined under FIFA eligibility rules; some limited exceptions apply. Players may hold more than one non-FIFA nationality.

No.	Pos.	Nation	Player
7	MF	IRI	Majid Bajelan (from Mes Sarcheshmeh)
4	MF	SRB	Saša Kolunija (from Pas Hamedan)
2	DF	IRI	Alireza Mohammad (from Persepolis)
20	DF	IRI	Hamid Reza Fathi (from Naft Tehran)
17	MF	IRI	Amin Torkashvand (from Parseh Tehran)
1	GK	ARM	Grigor Meliksetyan (from Paykan)
40	MF	IRI	Alireza Nikbakht (from Paykan)
15	MF	ARM	Hamlet Mkhitaryan (from Parseh Tehran)
8	MF	IRI	Siamak Sarlak (from Tractor Sazi)
9	FW	IRI	Farid Abedi (from Nassaji)
16	DF	IRI	Arman Ghasemi (from Niroye Zamini)
11	FW	IRI	Mojtaba Zarei (from Naft Tehran)
3	FW	IRI	Hadi Rekabi (from Naft Tehran)
33	GK	IRI	Shahram Mehraban (from Paykan)
36	MF	IRI	Majid Khodabandelou (from Paykan)
14	MF	IRI	Mohammad Reza Khorsandnia (from Paykan)
13	FW	IRI	Taghi Nayebi (from Niroye Zamini)

Out: Note: Flags indicate national team as defined under FIFA eligibility rules; some limited exceptions apply. Players may hold more than one non-FIFA nationality.

No.	Pos.	Nation	Player
—	FW	IRI	Mohammad Gholamin (to Iranjavan)
—	MF	IRI	Mohammad Reza Jalali (to Fajr Sepasi F.C.)
—	DF	IRI	Hossein Babaei (to Naft Tehran)
—	DF	IRI	Ali Vagheb (to Naft Tehran)
—	MF	IRI	Ali Ghorbani (Released)
—	MF	IRI	Alireza Nikbakht (Released)

=== Malavan ===
In: Note: Flags indicate national team as defined under FIFA eligibility rules; some limited exceptions apply. Players may hold more than one non-FIFA nationality.

No.	Pos.	Nation	Player
5	DF	IRI	Siamak Kouroshi (from Naft Tehran)
22	GK	MDA	Serghei Paşcenco (from (Moldova) FC Olimpia)
8	MF	IRI	Pejman Nouri (from Free Agent)
13	DF	IRI	Javad Shirzad (from Esteghlal)
9	MF	IRI	Maziar Zare (from Persepolis)
7	MF	IRI	Hossein Badamaki (from Persepolis)

Out: Note: Flags indicate national team as defined under FIFA eligibility rules; some limited exceptions apply. Players may hold more than one non-FIFA nationality.

No.	Pos.	Nation	Player
11	MF	IRI	Mohsen Mosalman (to Zob Ahan)
2	DF	IRI	Ramin Khosravi (released)
24	DF	IRI	Arash Soosarian (released)
21	MF	IRI	Mohammad Rostami (released)
7	MF	IRI	Mohammad Hamrang (to Gahar)
25	MF	IRI	Mehdi Daghagheleh (to Sanat Naft Abadan F.C.)
3	DF	IRI	Mojtaba Ensafi (Released)
5	DF	IRI	Alireza Jarahkar (Released)
6	MF	IRI	Mohammad Hassan Rajabzadeh (to Rah Ahan)

=== Mes Kerman ===
In: Note: Flags indicate national team as defined under FIFA eligibility rules; some limited exceptions apply. Players may hold more than one non-FIFA nationality.

No.	Pos.	Nation	Player
21	MF	SRB	Ivan Petrovic (from Shahin Bushehr)
18	MF	IRI	Mehrdad Karimian (from Fajr Sepasi F.C.)
13	GK	MNE	Milan Mijatović (from (Montenegro) Rudar Pljevlja)
5	FW	IRI	Mehdi Mohammadi (from Steel Azin)
11	FW	IRI	Reza Enayati (from Saba Qom)
7	MF	IRI	Shahram Goudarzi (from Shahrdari Tabriz)
20	MF	IRI	Masoud Nazarzadeh (from Shahin Bushehr)
4	MF	IRI	Hossein Kazemi (from Rah Ahan)
15	MF	SRB	Stevan Bates (from (Azerbaijan) Khazar Lankaran)
14	MF	IRI	Hamid Kazemi (from Steel Azin)
16	DF	IRI	Pouria Seifpanahi (from Pas Hamedan)

Out: Note: Flags indicate national team as defined under FIFA eligibility rules; some limited exceptions apply. Players may hold more than one non-FIFA nationality.

No.	Pos.	Nation	Player
11	DF	IRI	Mehrdad Pooladi (to Persepolis)
—	MF	IRI	Mohsen Bayatinia (to Sang Ahan Bafq)
5	DF	IRI	Ghasem Dehnavi (to Tractor Sazi)
4	DF	IRI	Sepehr Heidari (to Zob Ahan)
7	FW	IRI	Mohsen Khalili (to Saba Qom)
40	MF	IRI	Adel Kolahkaj (to Sepahan)
17	MF	IRI	Mostafa Seifi (to Naft Tehran)
1	GK	IRI	Ershad Yousefi (to Foolad)
21	GK	IRI	Farshad Ghadiri (to Saba Qom)
9	FW	SYR	George Mourad (to (Sweden) Syrianska)

=== Naft Tehran ===
In: Note: Flags indicate national team as defined under FIFA eligibility rules; some limited exceptions apply. Players may hold more than one non-FIFA nationality.

No.	Pos.	Nation	Player
2	DF	IRI	Ahmad Alenemeh (from Tractor Sazi)
30	DF	IRI	Hossein Babaei (from Gahar Zagros)
17	MF	BRA	Magno (from Damash Gilan)
19	FW	IRI	Saman Nariman Jahan (from Mashin Sazi)
18	DF	IRI	Bahman Kamel (from Mashin Sazi)
29	FW	CRO	Goran Ljubojević (from (Romania) FCM Târgu)
3	DF	IRI	Hadi Shakouri (from Shahin Bushehr)
14	MF	IRI	Mehdi Kheiri (from Saipa)
13	MF	IRI	Vahid Hamdinejad (from Saba Qom)
21	MF	IRI	Vouria Ghafouri (from Shahrdari Tabriz)
27	DF	IRI	Ali Vagheb (from Gahar Zagros)
9	MF	IRI	Mostafa Seifi (from Mes Kerman)

Out: Note: Flags indicate national team as defined under FIFA eligibility rules; some limited exceptions apply. Players may hold more than one non-FIFA nationality.

No.	Pos.	Nation	Player
10	MF	IRI	Mehdi Rafiei (Released)
11	FW	IRI	Mojtaba Zarei (to Gahar)
27	FW	POR	Marco Paixão (Released)
19	MF	BRA	Ferreira (to Paykan)
20	DF	IRI	Hamid Reza Fathi (to Gahar Zagros)
25	DF	IRI	Siamak Kouroshi (to Malavan)
5	MF	BRA	Márcio Alemão (to Saipa)
8	MF	IRI	Reza Magholi (to Paykan)
12	MF	IRI	Mehdi Agha Mohammadi (Released)
16	DF	IRI	Meysam Khosravi (Released)
31	MF	IRI	Shahin Kheiri (Released)
35	MF	IRI	Amir Reza Khanmohammadi (Released)

=== Paykan ===
In: Note: Flags indicate national team as defined under FIFA eligibility rules; some limited exceptions apply. Players may hold more than one non-FIFA nationality.

No.	Pos.	Nation	Player
27	MF	IRI	Bahram Dabbagh (from Tractor Sazi)
5	DF	IRI	Jalal Kameli Mofrad (from Foolad)
19	FW	IRI	Reza Taheri (from Pas)
21	DF	IRI	Nader Ahmadi (from Pas)
20	DF	IRI	Alireza Mirshafian (from Pas)
1	GK	BRA	Fábio Carvalho (from Iranjavan)
23	MF	IRI	Iman Mobali (from Esteghlal)
19	MF	BRA	Ferreira (from Naft Tehran)
4	MF	IRI	Reza Magholi (from Naft Tehran)
2	DF	IRI	Hamidreza Divsalar (from Malavan)
22	FW	IRI	Issa Alekasir (from Esteghlal Ahvaz)

Out: Note: Flags indicate national team as defined under FIFA eligibility rules; some limited exceptions apply. Players may hold more than one non-FIFA nationality.

No.	Pos.	Nation	Player
28	FW	BRA	Junior (to Saipa)
10	MF	IRI	Alireza Nikbakht (to Gahar)
—	GK	ARM	Grigor Meliksetyan (to Gahar)
—	MF	IRI	Hasan Eslami (to Saipa)
—	MF	IRI	Mohammad Parvin (Released)
—	MF	IRI	Davoud Seyed Abbasi (Released)
—	MF	IRI	Behshad Yavarzadeh (to Rah Ahan)
—	DF	IRI	Mohsen Arzani (to Saipa)
—	FW	IRI	Iman Heydari (Released)
—	MF	IRI	Mohammad Reza Khorsand (to Gahar)
—	DF	IRI	Masoud Zarei (to Damash Gilan)
—	GK	IRI	Shahrah Mehraban (to Gahar)
—	MF	IRI	Majid Khodabandelou (to Gahar)
—	MF	IRI	Saber Mirghorbani (to Sang Ahan Bafq)

=== Persepolis ===
In: Note: Flags indicate national team as defined under FIFA eligibility rules; some limited exceptions apply. Players may hold more than one non-FIFA nationality.

No.	Pos.	Nation	Player
1	GK	IRI	Shahab Gordan (from Zob Ahan)
16	DF	IRI	Mehrdad Pooladi (from Mes Kerman)
4	DF	IRI	Jalal Hosseini (from Sepahan)
6	DF	IRI	Mohsen Bengar (from Sepahan)
11	FW	IRI	Mohammad Ghazi (from Zob Ahan)
13	DF	IRI	Hossein Mahini (from Zob Ahan)
30	DF	IRI	Mohammad Reza Khanzadeh (from Rah Ahan)
31	MF	IRI	Afshin Esmaeilzadeh (from Damash Gilan)
9	FW	IRI	Karim Ansarifard (from Saipa)
15	MF	BRA	Roberto Sousa (from (Portugal) C.S. Marítimo)
21	GK	IRI	Amir Abedzadeh (from (United States) Los Angeles Blues)
22	MF	IRI	Mehrzad Madanchi (from (United Arab Emirates) Al-Shaab)
40	GK	BRA	Nilson Corrêa (from (Portugal) Guimarães)
32	FW	IRI	Farshad Ahmadzadeh (from Parseh Tehran)

Out: Note: Flags indicate national team as defined under FIFA eligibility rules; some limited exceptions apply. Players may hold more than one non-FIFA nationality.

No.	Pos.	Nation	Player
1	GK	BIH	Asmir Avdukić (loan return to (Bosnia and Herzegovina) Borac Banja Luka)
22	GK	IRI	Misagh Memarzadeh (Released)
38	GK	IRI	Hossein Hooshyar (to Aboomoslem)
2	DF	IRI	Alireza Mohammad (to Gahar)
4	DF	IRI	Mojtaba Shiri (to Pas Hamedan)
6	DF	IRI	Mohammad Nosrati (to Tractor Sazi)
13	DF	IRI	Sheys Rezaei (to Shahrdari Tabriz)
18	DF	IRI	Ebrahim Shakouri (to Saipa)
30	DF	BFA	Mamadou Tall (Released)
9	MF	IRI	Maziar Zare (to Malavan)
11	MF	IRI	Hossein Badamaki (to Malavan)
40	MF	IRI	Mohammad Mehdi Elhaei (to Sanat Naft)
21	FW	IRI	Vahid Hashemian (Retired)
33	FW	IRI	Mehrdad Oladi (to Malavan)

=== Rah Ahan ===
In: Note: Flags indicate national team as defined under FIFA eligibility rules; some limited exceptions apply. Players may hold more than one non-FIFA nationality.

No.	Pos.	Nation	Player
16	MF	IRI	Jahangir Asgari (from Damash Gilan)
7	MF	IRI	Farzad Ashoubi (from Tractor Sazi)
20	DF	IRI	Pirouz Ghorbani (from Saipa)
22	GK	IRI	Mohammad Mohammadi (from Esteghlal)
3	DF	IRI	Ali Hosseini (from Damash Gilan)
19	DF	IRI	Nader Hooshyar (from Saipa)
23	MF	IRI	Mohammad Hassan Rajabzadeh (from Malavan)
12	MF	IRI	Behshad Yavarzadeh (from Paykan)

Out: Note: Flags indicate national team as defined under FIFA eligibility rules; some limited exceptions apply. Players may hold more than one non-FIFA nationality.

No.	Pos.	Nation	Player
3	DF	IRI	Mohammad Reza Khanzadeh (to Persepolis)
14	MF	IRI	Hossein Kazemi (to Mes Kerman)
23	GK	IRI	Hassan Roudbarian (to Damash Gilan)
15	MF	TUN	Mohamed Ali Gharzoul (Released)
19	MF	SYR	Mahmoud Amnah (Released)
20	MF	IRI	Saeid Chahjouei (Released)
30	FW	IRI	Hossein Hejazipour (Released)
25	MF	IRI	Mohammad Sadegh Barani (to Zob Ahan)

=== Saba Qom ===
In: Note: Flags indicate national team as defined under FIFA eligibility rules; some limited exceptions apply. Players may hold more than one non-FIFA nationality.

No.	Pos.	Nation	Player
14	DF	IRI	Saeed Lotfi (from Shahrdari Arak)
19	FW	IRI	Bahman Tahmasbi (from Aluminium Hormozgan)
17	MF	IRI	Abdolfazl Ebrahimi (from Aluminium Hormozgan)
10	FW	IRI	Mohsen Khalili (from Mes Kerman)
21	GK	IRI	Farshad Ghadiri (from Mes Kerman)
4	DF	IRI	Masoud Haghjou (from Shahrdari Arak)
22	GK	IRI	Mehrdad Tahmasbi (from Kaveh Tehran)
13	DF	IRI	Mohammad Aram Tab (from Aluminium Hormozgan)
30	MF	IRI	Mehdi Momeni (from Foolad)
16	MF	IRI	Farid Karimi (from Steel Azin)
12	MF	CMR	David Wirikom (from Shirin Faraz)

Out: Note: Flags indicate national team as defined under FIFA eligibility rules; some limited exceptions apply. Players may hold more than one non-FIFA nationality.

No.	Pos.	Nation	Player
16	MF	IRI	Vahid Hamdinejad (to Naft Tehran)
7	FW	IRI	Ali Molaei (to Fajr Sepasi)
10	FW	IRI	Reza Enayati (to Mes Kerman)
7	FW	IRI	Ali Molaei (to Fajr Sepasi)
1	GK	IRI	Ahmad Khormali (Released)
22	GK	IRI	Masoud Gholamalizad (Released)
4	DF	IRI	Sohrab Bakhtiarizadeh (Released)
15	MF	IRI	Masoud Keshvari Fard (Released)
21	MF	IRI	Morteza Hashemizadeh (to Iranjavan)
3	DF	IRI	Hamid Reza Farzaneh (Released)
23	FW	IRI	Ahmad Davoudi (Released)
—	MF	IRI	Hossein Gohari (Released)
—		IRI	Meysam Mohajer (Released)
—	DF	IRI	Rasoul Berosh (from Damash Gilan)

=== Saipa ===
In: Note: Flags indicate national team as defined under FIFA eligibility rules; some limited exceptions apply. Players may hold more than one non-FIFA nationality.

No.	Pos.	Nation	Player
17	MF	BRA	Márcio Alemão (from Naft Tehran)
28	FW	BRA	Junior (from Peykan)
1	GK	IRI	Rahman Ahmadi (from Sepahan)
2	MF	IRI	Saeed Norouzi (from Saipa Shomal)
24	MF	IRI	Vahid Barati (from Saipa Mehr Karaj)
11	MF	IRI	Mohsen Yousefi (from Esteghlal)
3	MF	IRI	Hassan Eslami (from Paykan)
14	FW	IRI	Kaveh Rezaei (from Foolad)
21	DF	IRI	Mohsen Arzani (from Paykan)
13	DF	IRI	Ebrahim Shakouri (from Persepolis)
27	FW	IRI	Mansour Tanhaei (from Shahin)
10	FW	IRI	Saeed Daghighi (from Shahrdari Tabriz)

Out: Note: Flags indicate national team as defined under FIFA eligibility rules; some limited exceptions apply. Players may hold more than one non-FIFA nationality.

No.	Pos.	Nation	Player
10	FW	IRI	Karim Ansarifard (to Persepolis)
11	FW	IRI	Amin Manouchehri (to Esteghlal)
30	GK	IRI	Hossein Ashena (Released)
21	FW	IRI	Abbas Mohammad Rezaei (to Fajr Sepasi)
3	DF	IRI	Jaber Ansari (to Fajr Sepasi)
20	DF	IRI	Pirouz Ghorbani (to Rah Ahan)
16	MF	IRI	Javad Ashtiani (Released)
33	MF	IRI	Omid Ravankhah (Released)
1	GK	IRI	Sajjad Biranvand (to Mes Sarcheshmeh)
17	MF	IRI	Ali Reza Latifi (to Fajr Sepasi)
27	DF	IRI	Nader Hooshyar (to Rah Ahan)

=== Sanat Naft ===
In: Note: Flags indicate national team as defined under FIFA eligibility rules; some limited exceptions apply. Players may hold more than one non-FIFA nationality.

No.	Pos.	Nation	Player
1	GK	CRO	Marko Šimić (from (Serbia) FK Jagodina)
2	MF	IRI	Abouzar Rahimi (from Damash Gilan)
32	MF	IRI	Mohammad Mehdi Elhaei (from Persepolis)
25	MF	IRI	Mehdi Daghagheleh (from Malavan)
17	MF	BRA	Diogo Melo (from (Portugal) Académica)
5	DF	IRI	Nabiollah Bagheriha (from Shahrdari Tabriz)
4	DF	IRI	Elyas Shahnavazipour (from Parseh Tehran)

Out: Note: Flags indicate national team as defined under FIFA eligibility rules; some limited exceptions apply. Players may hold more than one non-FIFA nationality.

No.	Pos.	Nation	Player
2	DF	IRI	Hedayat Shahriari (released)
12	MF	IRI	Hossein Salami (released)
11	FW	MLI	Founéké Sy (to (United Arab Emirates) Ajman Club)
7	MF	IRI	Omid Sharifinasab (retired)
40	GK	IRI	Abbas Mohammadi (released)
17	MF	IRI	Nabi Saki (released)
10	MF	ARM	Levon Pachajyan (released)
—	DF	IRI	Meysam Amiri (to Shahin Bushehr)
25	MF	PLE	Imad Zatara (released)
18	FW	IRI	Mehrdad Mir (released)
14	DF	IRI	Hadi Ramezani (to Damash)

=== Sepahan ===
In: Note: Flags indicate national team as defined under FIFA eligibility rules; some limited exceptions apply. Players may hold more than one non-FIFA nationality.

No.	Pos.	Nation	Player
1	GK	IRI	Mohammad Bagher Sadeghi (from Zob Ahan)
3	DF	IRI	Farshid Talebi (from Zob Ahan)
5	DF	IRI	Mohammad Ali Ahmadi (from Zob Ahan)
7	MF	IRI	Milad Zeneyedpour (from Damash Gilan)
8	FW	IRI	Mohammad Gholami (from Damash Gilan)
11	DF	IRI	Mohsen Irannejad (from Shahin Bushehr)
12	MF	IRI	Ali Karimi (from Sepahan Youth)
18	DF	IRI	Mohammad Hossein Moradmand (from Sepahan Youth)
21	FW	MNE	Radomir Đalović (from (Russia) Amkar Perm)
23	MF	IRI	Amin Jahan Alian (from Sepahan Youth)
25	FW	IRI	Mehdi Sharifi (from Sepahan Youth)
26	FW	IRI	Ali Choopani (from Sepahan Youth)
27	GK	IRI	Mehdi Amini (from Sepahan Youth)
33	FW	IRI	Mohammad Reza Khalatbari (from (United Arab Emirates) Al Wasl FC)
38	MF	ALB	Ervin Bulku (from (Azerbaijan) AZAL Baku)
40	MF	IRI	Adel Kolahkaj (from Mes Kerman)

Out: Note: Flags indicate national team as defined under FIFA eligibility rules; some limited exceptions apply. Players may hold more than one non-FIFA nationality.

No.	Pos.	Nation	Player
1	GK	IRI	Rahman Ahmadi (to Saipa)
6	DF	IRI	Jalal Hosseini (to Persepolis)
7	FW	IRQ	Emad Mohammed Ridha (Released)
8	DF	IRI	Mohsen Bengar (to Persepolis)
11	MF	IRI	Mehdi Karimian (to Tractor Sazi)
16	DF	IRI	Hashem Beikzadeh (to Esteghlal)
18	MF	IRI	Reza Nasehi (to Aluminium Hormozgan)
19	FW	BRA	Bruno Correa (to (United Arab Emirates) Al Nasr)
21	DF	IRI	Mehdi Nasiri (to Shahin Bushehr)
23	FW	IRI	Mehdi Seyed-Salehi (to Tractor Sazi)
25	DF	IRI	Iman Kiani (Released)
26	DF	IRI	Saeed Lotfi (Released)
27	GK	IRI	Hadi Rishesfahani (to Esteghlal)
31	FW	IRI	Sardar Azmoun (to (Russia) Rubin Kazan)
37	MF	BRA	Fabio Januario (to Esteghlal)

=== Tractor Sazi ===
In: Note: Flags indicate national team as defined under FIFA eligibility rules; some limited exceptions apply. Players may hold more than one non-FIFA nationality.

No.	Pos.	Nation	Player
18	MF	POR	João Vilela (from (Portugal) Gil Vicente)
9	FW	POR	Anselmo Cardoso (from (Portugal) Nacional)
2	MF	IRI	Mohammad Iranpourian (from Shahrdari Tabriz)
20	DF	IRI	Mohammad Nosrati (from Persepolis)
23	FW	IRI	Mehdi Seyed-Salehi (from Sepahan)
7	MF	IRI	Mehdi Karimian (from Sepahan)
26	DF	IRI	Mehdi Ghoreishi (from Foolad Yazd)
27	DF	IRI	Mohammad Ebadzadeh (from Steel Azin)
5	DF	IRI	Ghasem Dehnavi (from Mes Kerman)
17	DF	IRI	Alireza Jalili (from Gahar Zagros)

Out: Note: Flags indicate national team as defined under FIFA eligibility rules; some limited exceptions apply. Players may hold more than one non-FIFA nationality.

No.	Pos.	Nation	Player
23	MF	IRI	Ghasem Haddadifar (loan return to Zob Ahan)
20	MF	ITA	Rodrigo Tosi (to Esteghlal)
10	FW	IRI	Siavash Akbarpour (to Esteghlal)
2	DF	IRI	Amir Hossein Sadeghi (to Esteghlal)
27	MF	IRI	Bahram Dabbagh (to Paykan)
7	MF	IRI	Farzad Ashoubi (to Rah Ahan)
9	FW	IRI	Ali Alizadeh (Released)
21	MF	IRI	Siamak Sarlak (to Gahar)
4	DF	IRI	Ahmad Alenemeh (Released)

=== Zob Ahan ===
In: Note: Flags indicate national team as defined under FIFA eligibility rules; some limited exceptions apply. Players may hold more than one non-FIFA nationality.

No.	Pos.	Nation	Player
19	DF	IRI	Milad Mir Torabi (from Parseh Tehran)
16	MF	IRI	Farshad Bahadorani (from Gostaresh Foolad)
—	MF	IRI	Arash Barani (from Zob Ahan Novin)
20	DF	IRI	Saeed Abdollahpour (from Aboomoslem)
23	DF	IRI	Ahmad Mohammadpour (Loan return, from Aboomoslem)
12	GK	IRI	Masoud Homami (from Shahrdari Tabriz)
3	DF	IRI	Sepehr Heidari (from Mes Kerman)
11	MF	IRI	Mohsen Mosalman (from Malavan)
1	GK	MNE	Darko Božović (from (Serbia) Sloboda Užice)
8	MF	IRI	Ghasem Haddadifar (loan return from Tractor Sazi)
30	MF	IRI	Mehdi Rajabzadeh (from Fajr Sepasi)
13	DF	IRI	Ibrahim Mohammadi (from Shahrdari Bandar Abbas)
25	MF	IRI	Mohammad Sadegh Barani (from Rah Ahan)

Out: Note: Flags indicate national team as defined under FIFA eligibility rules; some limited exceptions apply. Players may hold more than one non-FIFA nationality.

No.	Pos.	Nation	Player
—	FW	IRI	Omid Abdolhassani (to Shahin Bushehr)
3	MF	BRA	Felipe Alves (released)
16	MF	POR	Hugo Machado (to Paykan)
5	DF	IRI	Mohammad-Ali Ahmadi (to Sepahan)
1	GK	IRI	Shahab Gordan (to Persepolis)
14	MF	IRI	Mohammad Mansouri (to Aboomoslem)
4	DF	IRI	Farshid Talebi (to Sepahan FC)
11	FW	IRI	Mohammad Ghazi (to Persepolis)
15	MF	BRA	Igor Castro (Released)
22	GK	IRI	Mohammad Bagher Sadeghi (to Sepahan)
20	DF	IRI	Hossein Mahini (to Persepolis)
—	MF	IRI	Davoud Haghi (to Sang Ahan Bafq)

== Azadegan League ==
=== Aboomoslem ===
In: Note: Flags indicate national team as defined under FIFA eligibility rules; some limited exceptions apply. Players may hold more than one non-FIFA nationality.

No.	Pos.	Nation	Player
1	GK	IRI	Hossein Hooshyar (from Persepolis)
10	FW	IRI	Younes Shakeri (from Fajr Sepasi)
2	DF	IRI	Mohsen Neysani (from Shahrdari Tabriz)
3	DF	IRI	Morteza Gholamalitabar (from Machinesazi)
—	DF	IRI	Mohammad Kouti (from Iranjavan)
7	MF	IRI	Mohammad Mansouri (from Zob Ahan)
—	MF	IRI	Ahmad Taghavi (from Aluminium)
8	MF	IRI	Majid Noormohammadi (from Aluminium Hormozgan F.C.)
12		IRI	Omid Gholami (from Mes Rafsanjan F.C.)
21	DF	IRI	Mohammad Rostami (from Malavan F.C.)
16		IRI	Morteza Falahati (from Shahrdari Arak F.C.)
—		IRI	Abdollah Tohidi (from Esteghlal Ahvaz F.C.)
33	MF	IRI	Meisam Rezapour (from Foolad Gostar F.C.)
18	MF	IRI	Ahmad Moqadasipour (from Free agent)
19	DF	IRI	Sajjad Ahmadi Hosseini (from Tarbiat Yazd F.C.)
—		IRI	Seyed Sajjad Seyed (from U23 team)
—		IRI	Seyed Ali Rigi (from U23 team)

Out: Note: Flags indicate national team as defined under FIFA eligibility rules; some limited exceptions apply. Players may hold more than one non-FIFA nationality.

No.	Pos.	Nation	Player
—	FW	GER	Shpejtim Arifi (Released)
—	FW	NGR	Daniel Olerum (Released)
—	GK	ARM	Mayis Azizyan (Released)
—	DF	IRI	Ahmad Mohammadpour (Released)
—	DF	IRI	Saeed Abdollahpour (Released)
—	GK	IRI	Amin Jalalian (Released)
—	GK	IRI	Nader Jalayi Ashkzari (Released)
—	DF	IRI	Mehdi Tajik (Released)
—	DF	IRI	Majid Ghadimi (Released)
—	MF	IRI	Mojtaba Ensafi (to Sang Ahan Bafq)
—	MF	IRI	Jafar Afhami (Released)
—	MF	IRI	Salman Zahmatkesh (Released)
—	MF	IRI	Mohammad Soleiman-Falah (Released)
—	MF	IRI	Behzad Shiri (Released)
—	MF	IRI	Nasser Abbasi (Released)
—	MF	IRI	Mehdi Hosseini (Released)
—	FW	IRI	Qader Pourhamzavi (Released)
—	MF	IRI	Ali Salmani (Released)
—	MF	IRI	Mohsen Azarbad (Released)
—	FW	IRI	Mohammad Pahlavanpour (Released)
—	DF	IRI	Ahmad Hanafi (Released)
—	FW	IRI	Iman Rezaei (Released)
—	MF	IRI	Afshin Daneshian (to Shahin Bushehr F.C.)

=== Alvand Hamedan ===
In: Note: Flags indicate national team as defined under FIFA eligibility rules; some limited exceptions apply. Players may hold more than one non-FIFA nationality.

No.	Pos.	Nation	Player
22	GK	IRI	Hadi Zarrin-Saed (from Esteghlal)
31	MF	IRI	Mostafa Mahdavikia (from Naft)
18	MF	IRI	Hadi Bolouri (from Pas Hamedan)

Out: Note: Flags indicate national team as defined under FIFA eligibility rules; some limited exceptions apply. Players may hold more than one non-FIFA nationality.

No.	Pos.	Nation	Player

=== Esteghlal Ahvaz ===
In: Note: Flags indicate national team as defined under FIFA eligibility rules; some limited exceptions apply. Players may hold more than one non-FIFA nationality.

No.	Pos.	Nation	Player
—	MF	IRI	Sajjad Kermani (from Shardari Arak)
12	MF	IRI	Abdollah Mombeyni (from Foolad)
7	MF	IRI	Ahmad Doostan Ashoori (from Esteghlal Melli Ahvaz)
—	MF	IRI	Fakhroddin Shahriari (from Naft Gachsaran)
17	MF	IRI	Ahmed Bouzar (from Foolad Novin)

Out: Note: Flags indicate national team as defined under FIFA eligibility rules; some limited exceptions apply. Players may hold more than one non-FIFA nationality.

No.	Pos.	Nation	Player
—	FW	IRI	Mohammad Shams (to Karoun Khuzestan)
—	FW	IRI	Issa Alekasir (to Peykan)

=== Esteghlal Sanati ===
In: Note: Flags indicate national team as defined under FIFA eligibility rules; some limited exceptions apply. Players may hold more than one non-FIFA nationality.

No.	Pos.	Nation	Player

Out: Note: Flags indicate national team as defined under FIFA eligibility rules; some limited exceptions apply. Players may hold more than one non-FIFA nationality.

No.	Pos.	Nation	Player

=== Etka ===
In: Note: Flags indicate national team as defined under FIFA eligibility rules; some limited exceptions apply. Players may hold more than one non-FIFA nationality.

No.	Pos.	Nation	Player

Out: Note: Flags indicate national team as defined under FIFA eligibility rules; some limited exceptions apply. Players may hold more than one non-FIFA nationality.

No.	Pos.	Nation	Player
—		IRI	Mohammad Vizbary (to Shahin Bushehr)
—	MF	IRI	Mohsen Ghaedpouri (to Shahin Bushehr)

=== Foolad Yazd ===
In: Note: Flags indicate national team as defined under FIFA eligibility rules; some limited exceptions apply. Players may hold more than one non-FIFA nationality.

No.	Pos.	Nation	Player

Out: Note: Flags indicate national team as defined under FIFA eligibility rules; some limited exceptions apply. Players may hold more than one non-FIFA nationality.

No.	Pos.	Nation	Player
—	MF	IRI	Mehdi Ghoreishi (to Tractor Sazi)

=== Gol Gohar ===
In: Note: Flags indicate national team as defined under FIFA eligibility rules; some limited exceptions apply. Players may hold more than one non-FIFA nationality.

No.	Pos.	Nation	Player
—	GK	IRI	Majid Gholami (from Shahin Bushehr)

Out: Note: Flags indicate national team as defined under FIFA eligibility rules; some limited exceptions apply. Players may hold more than one non-FIFA nationality.

No.	Pos.	Nation	Player

=== Gostaresh Foolad ===
In: Note: Flags indicate national team as defined under FIFA eligibility rules; some limited exceptions apply. Players may hold more than one non-FIFA nationality.

No.	Pos.	Nation	Player
33	MF	IRI	Shahriar Shirvand (from Mashin Sazi)
2	DF	IRI	Hedayat Shahryari (from Sanat Naft Abadan F.C.)
8	MF	IRI	Rasoul Alizadeh (from Machine Sazi)
1	GK	IRI	Mehdi Eslami (from Esteghlal)

Out: Note: Flags indicate national team as defined under FIFA eligibility rules; some limited exceptions apply. Players may hold more than one non-FIFA nationality.

No.	Pos.	Nation	Player

=== Gostaresh Foolad Sahand ===
In: Note: Flags indicate national team as defined under FIFA eligibility rules; some limited exceptions apply. Players may hold more than one non-FIFA nationality.

No.	Pos.	Nation	Player

Out: Note: Flags indicate national team as defined under FIFA eligibility rules; some limited exceptions apply. Players may hold more than one non-FIFA nationality.

No.	Pos.	Nation	Player

=== Hafari Ahvaz ===
In: Note: Flags indicate national team as defined under FIFA eligibility rules; some limited exceptions apply. Players may hold more than one non-FIFA nationality.

No.	Pos.	Nation	Player

Out: Note: Flags indicate national team as defined under FIFA eligibility rules; some limited exceptions apply. Players may hold more than one non-FIFA nationality.

No.	Pos.	Nation	Player

=== Iranjavan ===
In: Note: Flags indicate national team as defined under FIFA eligibility rules; some limited exceptions apply. Players may hold more than one non-FIFA nationality.

No.	Pos.	Nation	Player
18	FW	IRI	Amin Nasrollahzadeh (from Mes Rafsanjan)
9	FW	IRI	Mohammad Gholamin (from Gahar Zagros)
—	DF	IRI	Morteza Hashemizadeh (from Saba Qom)
—	MF	IRI	Karim Shaverdi (from Foolad)
—	MF	IRI	Mohammad Sanjari (from Parseh Tehran)
—	MF	IRI	Hamed Mazini Monfared (from Parseh Tehran)
—	MF	IRI	Mohammad Karimi (from Damash Gilan)
1	GK	IRI	Asghar Karamollahi (to Mes Sarcheshmeh)
5	DF	IRI	Reza Noorollahi (from Mes Sarcheshmeh)
6	DF	IRI	Ali Khaneki (from Mes Sarcheshmeh)

Out: Note: Flags indicate national team as defined under FIFA eligibility rules; some limited exceptions apply. Players may hold more than one non-FIFA nationality.

No.	Pos.	Nation	Player
—	GK	BRA	Fábio Carvalho (to Paykan)
—	DF	IRI	Mohammad Kouti (to Aboomoslem)

=== Machine Sazi ===
In: Note: Flags indicate national team as defined under FIFA eligibility rules; some limited exceptions apply. Players may hold more than one non-FIFA nationality.

No.	Pos.	Nation	Player

Out: Note: Flags indicate national team as defined under FIFA eligibility rules; some limited exceptions apply. Players may hold more than one non-FIFA nationality.

No.	Pos.	Nation	Player
—	DF	IRI	Morteza Gholamalitabar (to Aboomoslem)

=== Mes Rafsanjan ===
In: Note: Flags indicate national team as defined under FIFA eligibility rules; some limited exceptions apply. Players may hold more than one non-FIFA nationality.

No.	Pos.	Nation	Player

Out: Note: Flags indicate national team as defined under FIFA eligibility rules; some limited exceptions apply. Players may hold more than one non-FIFA nationality.

No.	Pos.	Nation	Player
—	FW	IRI	Amin Nasrollahzadeh (to Iranjavan)
—	GK	IRI	Amin Sanaei (to Shahin Bushehr)

=== Mes Sarcheshmeh ===
In: Note: Flags indicate national team as defined under FIFA eligibility rules; some limited exceptions apply. Players may hold more than one non-FIFA nationality.

No.	Pos.	Nation	Player
—	GK	IRI	Sajjad Biranvand (from Saipa)

Out: Note: Flags indicate national team as defined under FIFA eligibility rules; some limited exceptions apply. Players may hold more than one non-FIFA nationality.

No.	Pos.	Nation	Player
—	GK	IRI	Asgar Karamollahi (to Iranjavan)
—	DF	IRI	Reza Noorollahi (to Iranjavan)
—	DF	IRI	Ali Khaneki (to Iranjavan)
—	FW	UZB	Yaroslav Krushelnitskiy (to (Uzbekistan) Shurtan Guzar)
—	GK	IRI	Hassan Houri (to Shahin Bushehr)
—	MF	MNE	Nenad Brnović (to (Albania) Vllaznia Shkodër)
—	FW	IRI	Mojtaba Mahboub Mojaz (to Esteghlal F.C., Loan Return)
—	DF	GEO	Gorgi Krasovski (to (Armenia) Ulisses FC)
—	DF	IRI	Mojtaba Tarshiz (to Fajr Sepasi)
—	FW	NED	Collins John (to (Turkey) Bucaspor)
—	GK	IRI	Mohammad Khazaei (to Fajr Sepasi)
—	FW	IRI	Ali Samereh (Released)

=== Naft Masjed Soleyman ===
In: Note: Flags indicate national team as defined under FIFA eligibility rules; some limited exceptions apply. Players may hold more than one non-FIFA nationality.

No.	Pos.	Nation	Player

Out: Note: Flags indicate national team as defined under FIFA eligibility rules; some limited exceptions apply. Players may hold more than one non-FIFA nationality.

No.	Pos.	Nation	Player

=== Nassaji ===
In: Note: Flags indicate national team as defined under FIFA eligibility rules; some limited exceptions apply. Players may hold more than one non-FIFA nationality.

No.	Pos.	Nation	Player
1	GK	IRI	Ali Nazarmohammadi (from Pas Hamedan)
4	DF	IRI	Ali Ashourizad
11	FW	IRI	Farhad Kheirkhah (from Shahrdari Tabriz)
—		IRI	Shahriar Moradbeigi (from Niroye Zamini)

Out: Note: Flags indicate national team as defined under FIFA eligibility rules; some limited exceptions apply. Players may hold more than one non-FIFA nationality.

No.	Pos.	Nation	Player
—	MF	IRI	Hadi Sohrabi (to Damash Gilan)
—	FW	IRI	Farid Abedi (to Gahar)

=== Nirooye Zamini ===
In: Note: Flags indicate national team as defined under FIFA eligibility rules; some limited exceptions apply. Players may hold more than one non-FIFA nationality.

No.	Pos.	Nation	Player

Out: Note: Flags indicate national team as defined under FIFA eligibility rules; some limited exceptions apply. Players may hold more than one non-FIFA nationality.

No.	Pos.	Nation	Player
—	DF	IRI	Arman Ghasemi (to Gahar)
—		IRI	Shahriar Moradbeigi (to Nassaji)

=== Parseh Tehran ===
In: Note: Flags indicate national team as defined under FIFA eligibility rules; some limited exceptions apply. Players may hold more than one non-FIFA nationality.

No.	Pos.	Nation	Player

Out: Note: Flags indicate national team as defined under FIFA eligibility rules; some limited exceptions apply. Players may hold more than one non-FIFA nationality.

No.	Pos.	Nation	Player
—	MF	IRI	Mohammad Sanjari (to Iranjavan)
—	MF	IRI	Hamed Mazini Monfared (to Iranjavan)
—	DF	IRI	Milad Mirtorabi (to Zob Ahan)
—	MF	ARM	Hamlet Mkhitaryan (to Gahar)
—	MF	IRI	Amin Torkashvand (to Gahar)
—	DF	IRI	Elyas Shahnavazipour (to Sanat Naft Abadan F.C.)

=== PAS Hamadan ===
In: Note: Flags indicate national team as defined under FIFA eligibility rules; some limited exceptions apply. Players may hold more than one non-FIFA nationality.

No.	Pos.	Nation	Player
15	MF	IRI	Mohammad Alavi (from Machine Sazi Tabriz)
4	DF	IRI	Mojtaba Shiri (from Persepolis)
20	DF	IRI	Hamid Reza Fathi (from Naft Tehran)
9	FW	IRI	Meghdad Ghobakhlou (from Mes Kerman)
12	DF	IRI	Jalal Akbari (from Sepahan)
8	MF	IRI	Vahid Aliabadi (from Mes Sarcheshmeh)
40	FW	IRI	Lefteh Hamidi (from Shahrdari Arak)
22	GK	IRI	Masoud Gholamalizad (from Saba Qom)
7	DF	IRI	Oveis Kordjahan (from Mes Sarcheshmeh)
23	DF	IRI	Mohsen Pourhaji (from Nassaji Mazandaran)
3	DF	IRI	Abolghasem Pourasadollah (from Nassaji Mazandaran)
18	FW	IRI	Sajjad Khosravi (from Shirin Faraz)
21	FW	IRI	Amir Godari (from Niroye Zamini)
14	DF	IRI	Ahmad Jafari (from Sepahan)
11	DF	IRI	Abbas Kazemian (from Fajr Sepasi)
19	FW	IRI	Hossein Jodaki (from Datis Lorestan)
17	FW	IRI	Mehrdad Rezaei (from Foolad Novin)
38	FW	IRI	Ali Matouri (from Shahrdari Bandar Abbas)

Out: Note: Flags indicate national team as defined under FIFA eligibility rules; some limited exceptions apply. Players may hold more than one non-FIFA nationality.

No.	Pos.	Nation	Playerc
—	DF	IRI	Pouria Seifpanahi (to Mes Kerman)
—	MF	TJK	Akmal Kholmatov (Released)
—	MF	SRB	Saša Kolunija (Released, to Gahar Zagros)
—	FW	IRI	Amin Motevaselzadeh (to Damash)
—	DF	IRI	Nader Ahmadi (to Paykan)
—	DF	IRI	Alireza Mirshafian (to Paykan)
1	GK	IRI	Ali Nazarmohammadi (to Nassaji)

=== Saipa Shomal ===
In: Note: Flags indicate national team as defined under FIFA eligibility rules; some limited exceptions apply. Players may hold more than one non-FIFA nationality.

No.	Pos.	Nation	Player

Out: Note: Flags indicate national team as defined under FIFA eligibility rules; some limited exceptions apply. Players may hold more than one non-FIFA nationality.

No.	Pos.	Nation	Player

=== Sang Ahan Bafq Yazd ===
In: Note: Flags indicate national team as defined under FIFA eligibility rules; some limited exceptions apply. Players may hold more than one non-FIFA nationality.

No.	Pos.	Nation	Player
—	MF	IRI	Omid Khouraj (from Foolad)
20	MF	IRI	Saeid Bayat (from Shahin Bushehr)
6	MF	IRI	Mojtaba Ensafi (from F.C. Aboomoslem)
9	MF	IRI	Saber Mirghorbani (from Paykan)
1	GK	IRI	Ebrahim Mirzapour (from Shardari Tabriz)

Out: Note: Flags indicate national team as defined under FIFA eligibility rules; some limited exceptions apply. Players may hold more than one non-FIFA nationality.

No.	Pos.	Nation	Player
—	DF	IRI	Sajjad Ahmadi Hosseini (to Aboomoslem)

=== Shahin Bushehr ===
In: Note: Flags indicate national team as defined under FIFA eligibility rules; some limited exceptions apply. Players may hold more than one non-FIFA nationality.

No.	Pos.	Nation	Player
—	DF	IRI	Meysam Amiri (from Sanat Naft Abadan F.C.)
—	DF	IRI	Mehdi Nasiri (from Sepahan)
22	GK	IRI	Amin Sanaei (from Mes Rafsanjan)
—	FW	IRI	Behnam Beyranvand (from Shahrdari Tabriz)
—	FW	IRI	Omid Abolhassani (from Zob Ahan)
30		IRI	Mohammad Vizbary (from Etka Gorgan)
16	MF	IRI	Mohsen Ghaedpouri (from Etka Gorgan)
—	MF	IRI	Ali Abdolfathi (from Kaveh F.C.)
1	GK	IRI	Hassan Houri (from Mes Sarcheshmeh)
8	MF	IRI	Afshin Daneshian (from Aboomoslem)
6	MF	IRI	Saeed Khani (from Aboomoslem)

Out: Note: Flags indicate national team as defined under FIFA eligibility rules; some limited exceptions apply. Players may hold more than one non-FIFA nationality.

No.	Pos.	Nation	Player
—	MF	IRI	Saeid Bayat (to Sang Ahan Bafq)
21	MF	SRB	Ivan Petrovic (to Mes Kerman)
11	DF	IRI	Mohsen Irannejad (to Sepahan)
7	MF	IRI	Masoud Nazarzadeh (to Mes Kerman)
10	FW	IRI	Abbas Pourkhosravani (to Foolad)
2	MF	IRI	Mohsen Hamidi (to Aluminium Hormozgan)
16	MF	IRI	Mehdi Kiani (to Damash)
8	DF	IRI	Ali Ansarian (Released)
30	GK	IRI	Vahid Taleblou (Released)
18	MF	IRI	Amjad Shokuh Magham (to Aluminium Hormozgan)
3	DF	IRI	Hadi Shakouri (to Naft Tehran)
27	FW	IRI	Mansour Tanhaei (to Saipa)
1	GK	IRI	Majid Gholami (to Gol Gohar)

=== Shahrdari Arak ===
In: Note: Flags indicate national team as defined under FIFA eligibility rules; some limited exceptions apply. Players may hold more than one non-FIFA nationality.

No.	Pos.	Nation	Player
1	GK	IRI	Mohsen Eliasi (from Steel Azin)

Out: Note: Flags indicate national team as defined under FIFA eligibility rules; some limited exceptions apply. Players may hold more than one non-FIFA nationality.

No.	Pos.	Nation	Player
—	MF	IRI	Sajjad Kermani (to Esteghlal Ahvaz)
—	DF	IRI	Abdolfazl Gorbani (to Naft Tehran)
—	DF	IRI	Saeed Lotfi (to Saba Qom)

=== Shahrdari Bandar Abbas ===
In: Note: Flags indicate national team as defined under FIFA eligibility rules; some limited exceptions apply. Players may hold more than one non-FIFA nationality.

No.	Pos.	Nation	Player

Out: Note: Flags indicate national team as defined under FIFA eligibility rules; some limited exceptions apply. Players may hold more than one non-FIFA nationality.

No.	Pos.	Nation	Player
—	DF	IRI	Ibrahim Mohammadi (to Zob Ahan)

=== Shahrdari Tabriz ===
In: Note: Flags indicate national team as defined under FIFA eligibility rules; some limited exceptions apply. Players may hold more than one non-FIFA nationality.

No.	Pos.	Nation	Player
1	GK	IRI	Mehdi Vaezi
—	FW	IRI	Ali Karimi (from Aluminium Hormozgan)

Out: Note: Flags indicate national team as defined under FIFA eligibility rules; some limited exceptions apply. Players may hold more than one non-FIFA nationality.

No.	Pos.	Nation	Player
—	GK	IRI	Ebrahim Mirzapour (to Sang Ahan Bafq)
—	FW	IRI	Behnam Beyranvand (to Shahin Bushehr)
11	MF	IRI	Shahram Goudarzi (to Mes Kerman)
18	MF	IRI	Vouria Ghafouri (to Naft Tehran)
8	MF	IRI	Maysam Baou (to Esteghlal)
7	MF	IRI	Mohammad Iranpourian (to Tractor Sazi)
19	FW	IRI	Saeid Daghighi (to Saipa)
21	GK	IRI	Masoud Homami (to Zob Ahan)
5	DF	IRI	Nabiollah Bagheriha (to Sanat Naft Abadan F.C.)
6	DF	IRI	Abolfazl Hajizadeh (to Damash)
13	MF	IRI	Behnam Dadashvand (to Aluminium Hormozgan)
9	MF	IRI	Mehdi Mohammadzadeh (to Aluminium Hormozgan)
17	FW	IRI	Jafar Bazri (to Aluminium Hormozgan)
—	DF	IRI	Mohsen Neysani (to Aboomoslem)
—	FW	IRI	Farhad Kheirkhah (to Nassaji)

=== Shahrdari Yasuj ===
In: Note: Flags indicate national team as defined under FIFA eligibility rules; some limited exceptions apply. Players may hold more than one non-FIFA nationality.

No.	Pos.	Nation	Player

Out: Note: Flags indicate national team as defined under FIFA eligibility rules; some limited exceptions apply. Players may hold more than one non-FIFA nationality.

No.	Pos.	Nation	Player

=== Shirin Faraz ===
In: Note: Flags indicate national team as defined under FIFA eligibility rules; some limited exceptions apply. Players may hold more than one non-FIFA nationality.

No.	Pos.	Nation	Player

Out: Note: Flags indicate national team as defined under FIFA eligibility rules; some limited exceptions apply. Players may hold more than one non-FIFA nationality.

No.	Pos.	Nation	Player
—	MF	IRI	Sajjad Khosravi (to Pas Hamedan)
—	MF	CMR	David Wirikom (on loan to Saba Qom)

=== Steel Azin ===
In: Note: Flags indicate national team as defined under FIFA eligibility rules; some limited exceptions apply. Players may hold more than one non-FIFA nationality.

No.	Pos.	Nation	Player

Out: Note: Flags indicate national team as defined under FIFA eligibility rules; some limited exceptions apply. Players may hold more than one non-FIFA nationality.

No.	Pos.	Nation	Player
—	MF	LIE	Michele Polverino (to (Austria) Wolfsberger AC)
—	MF	IRI	Hamid Kazemi (to Mes Kerman)
30	MF	IRI	Mohammad Ebadzadeh (to Tractor Sazi)
—	MF	IRI	Farid Karimi (to Saba Qom)
—	GK	IRI	Mohsen Eliasi (Released)
—	MF	IRI	Mehran Ghasemi (to Esteghlal)
