= 2012–13 Esteghlal F.C. season =

Esteghlal F.C.
2012–13 season
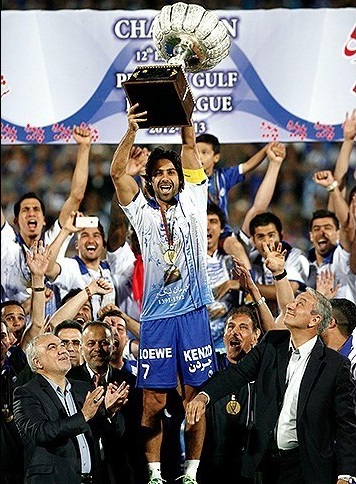
- President: (Iran) Ali Fathollahzadeh
- Head coach: (Iran) Amir Ghalenoei
- Stadium: Azadi Stadium
- IPL: 1st
- Hazfi Cup: Semi-Final
- Champions League: Semi-Final
- Top goalscorer: League: Arash Borhani (10 goals); All: Arash Borhani (15 goals)
- Highest home attendance: 100,000 v Persepolis (25 January 2013); 100,000 v Damash (10 May 2013)
- Lowest home attendance: 0 (spectator ban) v Gahar Zagros (12 April 2013)
- Average home league attendance: 32,235
Home colours	Away colours	Third colours

The 2012–13 season are the Esteghlal Football Club's 12th season in the Iran Pro League, and their 19th consecutive season in the top division of Iranian football. They are also competing in the Hazfi Cup and AFC Champions League, and 68th year in existence as a football club.

== Club ==
=== Kit ===
Supplier: (Germany) Uhlsport
Sponsor(s): (Iran) Refah Bank

Home kit	Away kit	Third kit

=== Coaching staff ===
Position	Staff
Head coach	(Iran) Amir Ghalenoei
Assistant coach	(Iran) Majid Saleh
First Team Coach	(Iran) Karim Bostani
First Team Coach	(Iran) Sattar Hamedani
Goalkeepers coach	(Iran) Hamid Babazadeh
Fitness coach	(Iran) Dr. Amir Haj-Ghasem
Analyzer	(Iran) Iman Alami
Analyzer	(Iran) Nima Rasouli
Analyzer	(Iran) Shahrokh Bayani
Analyzer	(Iran) Reza Rajabi
Physiotherapist	(Iran) Dr. Amin Norouzi
Doctor	(Iran) Dr. Kaveh Sotoudeh
Psychologist	(Iran) Dr. Abbas Montazeri
Technical Manager	(Iran) Mansour Pourheidari
Academy Manager	(Iran) Asghar Hajiloo
Director	(Iran) Mirshad Majedi

=== Other information ===
Chairman	(Iran) Ali Fathollahzadeh
Deputy Chairman	(Iran) Ali Nazari Juybari
Media Officer	(Iran) Hamed Afzali

=== Grounds ===
Ground (capacity and dimensions)	Azadi Stadium (100,000 / 110x75m)
Training ground	Hejazi Camp

== Player ==
=== First team squad ===
Last updated: 5 January 2012

Out for Injuries	Released – ride

No.	Name	Nationality	Position(s)	Date of birth (age)	Signed from
Goalkeepers
1	Mehdi Rahmati	(Iran)	GK	2 February 1983 (aged 29)	(Iran) Sepahan
35	Hadi Rishi Esfahani	(Iran)	GK	19 February 1992 (aged 20)	(Iran) Sepahan
~~29~~	~~Liam Reddy~~	(Australia)	~~GK~~	~~8 August 1981 (aged 30)~~	(Australia) Sydney FC
Defenders
2	Khosro Heydari	(Iran)	RM, RB	14 September 1983 (aged 28)	(Iran) Sepahan
4	Amir Hossein Sadeghi	(Iran)	CB, SW	6 September 1981 (aged 30)	(Iran) Tractor Sazi
5	Hanif Omranzadeh	(Iran)	CB, SW	30 April 1985 (aged 27)	(Iran) PAS Hamedan
12	Hassan Ashjari	(Iran)	LB, LWB	1 August 1979 (aged 32)	(Iran) Sepahan
18	Hashem Beikzadeh	(Iran)	LB, LM	22 January 1984 (aged 28)	(Iran) Sepahan
21	Armen Tahmasian	(Iran)	DF	5 June 1990 (aged 22)	(Iran) PAS Hamedan
25	Hojjat Chaharmahali	(Iran)	DF	25 March 1989 (aged 23)	(Iran) Sanat Naft
33	Pejman Montazeri	(Iran)	CB, SW	6 September 1983 (aged 28)	(Iran) Foolad
40	Ali Hamoudi	(Iran)	RB, RM	21 March 1986 (aged 26)	(Iran) Foolad
~~15~~	~~Mohammad Ansari~~	(Iran)	~~CB, SW~~		(Youth system)
~~16~~	~~Meisam Hosseini~~	(Iran)	~~LB, CB~~	~~7 June 1987 (aged 25)~~	(Iran) Gostaresh Foulad
Midfielders
3	Jlloyd Samuel	(Trinidad and Tobago)	DM, CM, LB	29 March 1981 (aged 31)	(England) Bolton
6	Javad Nekounam	(Iran)	DM, CM	7 September 1980 (aged 31)	(Spain) CA Osasuna
8	Mojtaba Jabari(captain)	(Iran)	CM, AM	16 June 1983 (aged 29)	(Iran) Aboumoslem
11	Saeed Lamei	(Iran)	MF	10 May 1987 (aged 25)	(Iran) Sanati Kaveh
14	Kianoush Rahmati	(Iran)	DM, CM	18 September 1978 (aged 33)	(Iran) Saipa
17	Maysam Baou	(Iran)	AM, CM	19 September 1983 (aged 28)	(Iran) Shahrdari Tabriz
19	Abbas Mohammadrezaei	(Iran)	LM, LW	9 September 1982 (aged 29)	(Iran) Fajr Sepasi
28	Mehran Ghasemi	(Iran)	MF	11 November 1991 (aged 20)	(Iran) Steel Azin
38	Vicente	(Bolivia)	AM, LM	22 November 1985 (age 40)	(Belgium) Charleroi
~~30~~	~~Rodrigo Tosi~~	(Brazil)	~~CM, AM~~	~~6 January 1983 (aged 29)~~	(Iran) Tractor Sazi
~~32~~	~~Ferydoon Zandi~~	(Iran)	~~AM, LM~~	~~26 April 1979 (aged 33)~~	(Iran) Steel Azin
~~37~~	~~Januário~~	(Brazil)	~~AM, CM~~	~~3 September 1979 (aged 32)~~	(Iran) Sepahan
Forwards
7	Farhad Majidi	(Iran)	ST	3 June 1976 (aged 36)	(United Arab Emirates) Al-Ahli
9	Arash Borhani	(Iran)	ST	14 September 1983 (aged 28)	(Iran) PAS Tehran
20	Siavash Akbarpour	(Iran)	AM, SS	21 January 1985 (aged 27)	(Iran) Tractor Sazi
24	Farzad Hatami	(Iran)	ST	3 January 1986 (aged 26)	(Iran) Tractor Sazi
36	Iman Mousavi	(Iran)	ST	5 February 1989 (age 37)	(Iran) Naft Tehran
~~10~~	~~Milad Meydavoudi~~	(Iran)	~~RW, ST~~	~~20 January 1985 (aged 27)~~	(Iran) Esteghlal Ahvaz
~~11~~	~~Amin Manouchehri~~	(Iran)	~~ST~~	~~6 February 1986 (aged 26)~~	(Iran) Saipa

=== Iran Pro League squad ===
As of 31 January 2013. Esteghlal F.C. Iran Pro League Squad 2011–12

Note: Flags indicate national team as defined under FIFA eligibility rules; some limited exceptions apply. Players may hold more than one non-FIFA nationality.

No.	Pos.	Nation	Player
1	GK	IRI	Mehdi Rahmati (3rd Captain)
2	DF	IRI	Khosro Heydari
3	DF	TTO	Jlloyd Samuel
4	DF	IRI	Amir Hossein Sadeghi
5	DF	IRI	Hanif Omranzadeh
6	MF	IRI	Javad Nekounam
7	FW	IRI	Farhad Majidi (Captain)
8	MF	IRI	Mojtaba Jabbari (Vice Captain)
9	FW	IRI	Arash Borhani
10	FW	IRI	Milad Meydavoudi
11	FW	IRI	Amin Manouchehri
12	DF	IRI	Hassan Ashjari
14	MF	IRI	Kianoush Rahmati
15	DF	IRI	Mohammad Ansari
16	DF	IRI	Meysam Hosseini
17	MF	IRI	Maysam Baou
18	DF	IRI	Hashem Beikzadeh

No.	Pos.	Nation	Player
19	MF	IRI	Abbas Mohammadrezaei
20	FW	IRI	Siavash Akbarpour
21	DF	IRI	Armen Tahmasian
22	GK	IRI	Hossein Hosseini
24	FW	IRI	Farzad Hatemi
25	DF	IRI	Hojjat Chaharmahali
26	DF	IRI	Mehdi Eslami
28	MF	IRI	Mehran Ghasemi
29	GK	AUS	Liam Reddy
30	MF	BRA	Rodrigo Tosi
32	MF	IRI	Ferydoon Zandi
33	DF	IRI	Pejman Montazeri (4th Captain)
35	GK	IRI	Hadi Rishi Esfahani
36	FW	IRI	Iman Mousavi
37	MF	BRA	Fabio Januario
38	MF	BOL	Vicente Arze
40	DF	IRI	Ali Hamoudi

=== AFC Champions League squad ===
As of 23 June 2013. Esteghlal F.C. Champions League Squad 2012–13

Note: Flags indicate national team as defined under FIFA eligibility rules; some limited exceptions apply. Players may hold more than one non-FIFA nationality.

No.	Pos.	Nation	Player
1	GK	IRI	Mehdi Rahmati (3rd Captain)
2	DF	IRI	Khosro Heydari
3	MF	TTO	Jlloyd Samuel
4	DF	IRI	Amir Hossein Sadeghi
5	DF	IRI	Hanif Omranzadeh
6	MF	IRI	Javad Nekounam
7	FW	IRI	Farhad Majidi (Captain)
8	MF	IRI	Mojtaba Jabbari (Vice Captain)
9	FW	IRI	Arash Borhani
10	MF	IRI	Siavash Akbarpour
11	MF	IRI	Saeed Lamei
12	DF	IRI	Hassan Ashjari
13	GK	IRI	Mehrdad Hosseini
14	MF	IRI	Kianoush Rahmati

No.	Pos.	Nation	Player
16	DF	IRI	Hashem Beikzadeh
17	MF	IRI	Maysam Baou
19	MF	IRI	Abbas Mohammadrezaei
21	MF	IRI	Armen Tahmasian
22	GK	IRI	Hossein Hosseini
24	FW	IRI	Farzad Hatemi
25	DF	IRI	Hojjat Chaharmahali
28	MF	IRI	Mehran Ghasemi
33	DF	IRI	Pejman Montazeri (4th Captain)
35	GK	IRI	Hadi Rishi Esfahani
36	FW	IRI	Iman Mousavi
38	MF	BOL	Vicente Arze
40	DF	IRI	Ali Hamoudi

== Transfers ==
Confirmed transfers 2012–13

=== Summer ===
In: Note: Flags indicate national team as defined under FIFA eligibility rules; some limited exceptions apply. Players may hold more than one non-FIFA nationality.

No.	Pos.	Nation	Player
17	MF	IRI	Maysam Baou (from Shahrdari Tabriz)
18	DF	IRI	Hashem Beikzadeh (from Sepahan)
11	FW	IRI	Amin Manouchehri (from Saipa)
25	FW	IRI	Mojtaba Mojaz (from Mes Sarcheshme, Loan Return)
22	DF	IRI	Amir Hossein Sadeghi (from Tractor Sazi)
23	MF	IRI	Iman Mobali (from (United Arab Emirates) Al Sharjah)
20	FW	IRI	Siavash Akbarpour (from Tractor Sazi)
20	GK	IRI	Mohammad Mohammadi (from Damash Gilan)
30	MF	BRA	Rodrigo Tosi (from Tractor Sazi)
37	MF	BRA	Fabio Januario (from Sepahan)
22	GK	IRI	Hossein Hosseini (from Bargh Shiraz)
35	GK	IRI	Hadi Rishi Esfahani (from Sepahan)
28	MF	IRI	Mehran Ghasemi (from Steel Azin)
21	DF	IRI	Armen Tahmasian (from Free agent)
6	MF	IRI	Javad Nekounam (from (Spain) CA Osasuna)
29	GK	AUS	Liam Reddy (from (Australia) Sydney FC)

Out: Note: Flags indicate national team as defined under FIFA eligibility rules; some limited exceptions apply. Players may hold more than one non-FIFA nationality.

No.	Pos.	Nation	Player
22	GK	IRI	Hadi Zarrin-Saed (to Alvand Hamedan)
4	DF	IRI	Hamid Azizzadeh (Released)
17	MF	CMR	Jacques Elong Elong (Released, to Naft Maysan)
34	MF	IRI	Hossein Alavi (Released)
25	FW	IRI	Mojtaba Mojaz (Released, to Parseh Tehran)
3	DF	IRI	Mehdi Amirabadi (to Foolad)
14	MF	IRI	Andranik Teymourian (to (Qatar) Al-Kharitiyath)
31	DF	IRI	Javad Shirzad (to Malavan)
37	FW	IRI	Esmaeil Sharifat (to Foolad)
11	MF	IRI	Mohsen Yousefi (to Saipa)
20	GK	IRI	Mohammad Mohammadi (to Rah Ahan)
23	MF	IRI	Iman Mobali (to Paykan)
36	GK	IRI	Mehdi Eslami (to Gostaresh Foulad)
20	FW	SRB	Goran Jerković (to (Thailand) Buriram United)
29	MF	IRI	Tohid Gholami (to Parseh Tehran)

=== Winter ===
In: Note: Flags indicate national team as defined under FIFA eligibility rules; some limited exceptions apply. Players may hold more than one non-FIFA nationality.

No.	Pos.	Nation	Player
19	MF	IRI	Abbas Mohammad Rezaei (from Fajr Sepasi)
12	DF	IRI	Hassan Ashjari (from Sepahan)
24	FW	IRI	Farzad Hatami (from Tractor Sazi)
25	DF	IRI	Hojjat Chaharmahali (Free Agent)
38	MF	BOL	Vicente Arze (from (Belgium) Charleroi)
11	FW	IRI	Iman Mousavi (from Naft Tehran)
7	FW	IRI	Farhad Majidi (Loan back from (Qatar) Al-Gharafa)

Out: Note: Flags indicate national team as defined under FIFA eligibility rules; some limited exceptions apply. Players may hold more than one non-FIFA nationality.

No.	Pos.	Nation	Player
32	MF	IRI	Ferydoon Zandi (to (Qatar) Al Ahli)
37	MF	BRA	Fabio Januario (Retired)
15	DF	IRI	Mohammad Ansari (to Fajr Sepasi)
16	DF	IRI	Meysam Hosseini (to Naft Tehran)
11	FW	IRI	Amin Manouchehri (to Naft Tehran)
10	FW	IRI	Milad Meydavoudi (to Aluminium Hormozgan)
30	MF	BRA	Rodrigo Tosi (to Brunei DPRMM)
29	GK	AUS	Liam Reddy (to (Australia) Sydney United)

== Competitions ==
=== Overview ===
Competition	Started round	Current position / round	Final position / round	First match	Last match
2012–13 Persian Gulf Cup	—	—	Winner	20 July 2012	10 May 2013
2012–13 Hazfi Cup	Round of 32	—	Semi-Final	14 December 2012	30 March 2013
AFC Champions League	Group stage	Round of 16		27 February 2013	

Source: Competitions

=== Competition record ===
Competition	Record							
Competition	G	W	D	L	GF	GA	GD	Win %
Iran Pro League	34	19	10	5	42	18	+24	55.88
Hazfi Cup	5	4	0	1	11	1	+10	80.00
2013 AFC Champions League	8	5	2	1	15	7	+8	62.50
Total	47	28	12	7	68	26	+42	59.57

=== Iran Pro League ===
==== Standings ====
Pos	Team	Pld	W	D	L	GF	GA	GD	Pts	Qualification or relegation
1	Esteghlal (C)	34	19	10	5	42	18	+24	67	Qualification for the 2014 AFC Champions League group stage
2	Tractor Sazi	34	18	11	5	55	32	+23	65	Qualification for the 2014 AFC Champions League group stage
3	Sepahan	34	19	7	8	64	33	+31	64	Qualification for the 2014 AFC Champions League group stage
4	Foolad	34	14	14	6	52	35	+17	56	Qualification for the 2014 AFC Champions League group stage
5	Naft Tehran	34	14	13	7	42	29	+13	55	

Updated to match(es) played on 10 May 2013. Source: IPL stats.com
Rules for classification: 1) points; 2) goal difference; 3) number of goals scored.
(C) Champions

==== Results summary ====
Overall								Home						Away					
Pld	W	D	L	GF	GA	GD	Pts	W	D	L	GF	GA	GD	W	D	L	GF	GA	GD
32	18	10	4	40	16	+24	64	11	4	1	20	8	+12	7	6	3	20	8	+12

Last updated: 15 April 2013.
Source: Ipl Stats

==== Results by round ====
Round	1	2	3	4	5	6	8	9	10	11	12	13	14	15	7	16	17	18	19	20	21	22	23	24	25	26	27	28	29	30	31	32	33	34
Ground	H	A	H	A	H	A	H	A	H	A	H	A	H	A	A	H	A	A	H	A	H	A	H	A	H	A	H	A	H	A	H	H	A	H
Result	W	L	W	D	D	D	W	D	W	W	L	W	W	W	W	L	L	W	W	D	W	D	D	W	W	W	W	D	W	D	W	D	W	L
Position	4	9	5	8	9	10	10	9	8	6	4	5	2	1	1	1	2	1	1	1	1	1	1	1	1	1	1	1	1	1	1	1	1	1

Updated to match(es) played on 22 November 2012. Source: "Ipl".
A = Away; H = Home; W = Win; D = Draw; L = Loss

==== Matches ====
Win Draw Loss Postponed

20 July 2012 1	Esteghlal	1–0	Aluminium	Tehran
22:15 UTC+04:30	Januario 56'; Omranzadeh (yellow card) 64'	IPLStats Report; Goal Report	Asgari (yellow card) 48'; Shokouh Magham (yellow card) 51'; Daneshdoost (yellow card) 62'	Stadium: Azadi Stadium; Attendance: 50,000; Referee: Ahmad Salehi

25 July 2012 2	Saipa	2–1	Esteghlal	Tehran
22:30 UTC+04:30	Sobhani 63'; Daghighi 82'	IPLStats Report; Goal Report	Akbarpour 81'	Stadium: Azadi Stadium; Attendance: 40,000; Referee: Alireza Faghani

31 July 2012 3	Esteghlal	1–0	Zob Ahan	Tehran
22:30 UTC+04:30	Akbarpour (yellow card) 13'; Manouchehri (yellow card) (goal) 83'	IPLStats Report; Goal Report	Ashouri (yellow card) 47'	Stadium: Azadi Stadium; Attendance: 35,000; Referee: Mohsen Torky

6 August 2012 4	Mes Kerman	0–0	Esteghlal	Kerman
22:30 UTC+04:30	Enayati (yellow card) 36'; Esmaeili Beigi (yellow card) 68'; Jahani (yellow card) 89'; Kazemi (yellow card)	IPLStats Report; Goal Report	Omranzadeh (yellow card) 80'; Borhani (yellow card)	Stadium: Shahid Bahonar Stadium; Attendance: 15,000; Referee: Ahmad Salehi

17 August 2012 5	Esteghlal	1–1	Malavan	Tehran
22:00 UTC+04:30	Beikzadeh (yellow card) 7'; Zandi (yellow card) 55'; Borhani (yellow card) 65' (goal) 73'	IPLStats Report; Goal Report	Nozhati 25'; Paşcenco (yellow card) 85'; Hajmohammadi (yellow card) 90+4'	Stadium: Azadi Stadium; Attendance: 30,000; Referee: Touraj Haghverdi

24 August 2012 6	Persepolis	0–0	Esteghlal	Tehran
18:10 UTC+04:30	Pouladi (yellow card) 15'; Feshangchi (yellow card) 90+5'	IPLStats Report; Goal Report	Akbarpour (yellow card) 24'; Omranzadeh (yellow card) 37'	Stadium: Azadi Stadium; Attendance: 100,000; Referee: Mohsen Torky

22 November 2012 7	Esteghlal	2–0	Paykan	Tehran
17:30 UTC+03:30	Akbarpour 59'; Omranzadeh (yellow card); Heydari (yellow card); Meydavoudi 90'	IPLStats Report; Summary	Dabbagh (yellow card)	Stadium: Azadi Stadium; Attendance: 3,000; Referee: Saeid Bakhshizadeh

15 September 2012 8	Rah Ahan	0–2	Esteghlal	Tehran
19:45 UTC+04:30	Ashoubi (yellow card); Mamani (yellow card)	IPLStats Report; Goal Report	Borhani 10'; Baou 82'; Zandi (yellow card)	Stadium: Azadi Stadium; Attendance: 10,000; Referee: Ashkan Khorshidi

21 September 2012 9	Esteghlal	0–0	Fajr Sepasi	Tehran
18:30 UTC+03:30		IPLStats Report; Goal Report		Stadium: Azadi Stadium; Attendance: 40,000; Referee: Mohsen Ghahremani

26 September 2012 10	Sanat Naft	1–2	Esteghlal	Abadan
18:30 UTC+03:30	Navidkia 2'	IPLStats Report	Nekounam (yellow card) 11'; Tosi 35'; Januário 58'	Stadium: Takhti Stadium; Attendance: 12,000; Referee: Mohsen Torky

1 October 2012 11	Esteghlal	1–0	Saba Qom	Tehran
18:15 UTC+03:30	Borhani 1'; Sadeghi (yellow card)	IPLStats Report; Summary	Lotfi (yellow card); Heidari (yellow card); Rezaeian (yellow card); Noori (yellow card)	Stadium: Azadi Stadium; Attendance: 10,000; Referee: Ahmad Salehi

20 October 2012 12	Tractor Sazi	2–0	Esteghlal	Tabriz
16:00 UTC+03:30	Paixão 39'; Fakhreddini 90+1'; Nosrati (yellow card); Kiani (yellow card)	IPLStats Report; Summary	Omranzadeh (yellow card)	Stadium: Yadegar-e Emam Stadium; Attendance: 50,000; Referee: Saeid Mozaffarizadeh

25 October 2012 13	Esteghlal	2–1	Naft Tehran	Tehran
19:00 UTC+03:30	Samuel 23'; Borhani 52'; Beikzadeh (yellow card); Akbarpour (yellow card); Baou (yellow card)	IPLStats Report; Summary	Karimi 16' (red card) 79'; Mousavi (yellow card); Ghafouri (red card) 79'	Stadium: Azadi Stadium; Attendance: 10,000; Referee: Mohsen Ghahremani

29 October 2012 14	Gahar Zagros	0–2	Esteghlal	Dorood
17:45 UTC+03:30		IPLStats Report; Summary	Borhani 17'; Samuel 20'; Manouchehri (yellow card)	Stadium: Dorood Stadium; Attendance: 5,400; Referee: Touraj Haghverdi

18 November 2012 15	Sepahan	0–1	Esteghlal	Isfahan
15:15 UTC+03:30	Khalatbari (yellow card) 92'; Navidkia (yellow card) 93'; Ahmadi (yellow card) 95'	IPLStats Report	Heydari 15'; Sadeghi (yellow card); Borhani (yellow card); Nekounam (red card) 93'	Stadium: Foolad Shahr Stadium; Attendance: 12,000; Referee: Saeid Mozaffarizadeh

27 November 2012 16	Esteghlal	2–3	Foolad	Tehran
17:30 UTC+03:30	Nekounam 63'; Borhani 74'	IPLStats Report; Summary	Karami 62'; Afshin 72'; Jama'ati 87'	Stadium: Azadi Stadium; Attendance: 5,000; Referee: Mohsen Ghahremani

4 December 2012 17	Damash Gilan	1–0	Esteghlal	Rasht
15:15 UTC+03:30	Kébé 85'; Hajati (yellow card)	IPLStats Report; Summary	Samuel (yellow card) 25' (yellow-red card) 39'; Manouchehri (yellow card); Heydari (yellow card); Nekounam (yellow card)	Stadium: Shahid Azodi Stadium; Attendance: 15,000; Referee: Mohsen Torky

26 December 2012 18	Aluminmium	0–2	Esteghlal	Bandar Abbas
15:15 UTC+03:30	Tighnavard (red card) 52'	IPLStats Report; Goal.com	Mousavi 14' (yellow card); Hatami 86'	Stadium: Takhti Stadium; Attendance: 20,000; Referee: Alireza Faghani

31 December 2012 19	Esteghlal	1–0	Saipa	Tehran
17:30 UTC+03:30	Hatami 54' (yellow card) 86'; Samuel (yellow card) 16'	IPLStats Report; Goal.com	Shiri (yellow card) 88'	Stadium: Azadi Stadium; Attendance: 10,000; Referee: Ahmad Salehi

5 January 2013 20	Zob Ahan	0–0	Esteghlal	Isfahan
17:30 UTC+03:30	Fofana (yellow card); Bayatinia (yellow card); Jarahkar (yellow card)	IPLStats Report; Goal.com	Omranzadeh (yellow card)	Stadium: Foolad Shahr; Attendance: 5,000; Referee: Touraj Haghverdi

14 January 2013 21	Esteghlal	2–1	Mes Kerman	Tehran
15:00 UTC+03:30	Borhani 25', 57'; Nekounam (yellow card); Majidi (yellow card)	IPLStats Report; Goal.com	Shojaei 55'; Bates (yellow card)	Stadium: Azadi Stadium; Attendance: 10,000; Referee: Mohsen Torki

19 January 2013 22	Malavan	0–0	Esteghlal	Anzali
15:30 UTC+03:30	Ezzatollahi (yellow card); Rafkhaei (yellow card)	IPLStats Report; Goal.com	Samuel (yellow card); Hatami (yellow card); Akbarpour (yellow card)	Stadium: Takhti Stadium; Attendance: 13,000; Referee: Yadollah Jahanbazi

25 January 2013 23	Esteghlal	0–0	Persepolis	Tehran
15:00 UTC+03:30		IPLStats Report; Goal.com; Fars	Haghighi (yellow card) 45'	Stadium: Azadi Stadium; Attendance: 100,000; Referee: Mohsen Ghahremani

29 January 2013 24	Paykan	0–3	Esteghlal	Tehran
16:50 UTC+03:30		IPLStats Report; Goal.com	Vicente 20'; Hatami 61'; Majidi 78' (yellow card) 79'	Stadium: Azadi Stadium; Attendance: 8,000; Referee: Touraj Haghverdi

8 February 2013 25	Esteghlal	1–0	Rah Ahan	Tehran
17:00 UTC+03:30	Majidi 71' (yellow card) 90'	IPLStats Report; Goal.com	Abdi (yellow card) 90+4'	Stadium: Azadi Stadium; Attendance: 18,000; Referee: Mohsen Torki

15 February 2013 26	Fajr Sepasi	0–5	Esteghlal	Shiraz
14:30 UTC+03:30	Khalil Azad (yellow card)	IPLStats Report; Goal.com; Fars	Nekounam 38' (pen.); Hatami 49', 70'; Akbarpour 64'; Borhani 90+1'; Samuel (yellow card)	Stadium: Hafezieh Stadium; Attendance: 15,000; Referee: Saeid Mozaffarizadeh

21 February 2013 27	Esteghlal	2–1	Sanat Naft	Tehran
19:00 UTC+03:30	Ashjari (yellow card); Nekounam (yellow card); Hatami (red card) 35'; Montazeri (yellow card) 71' (goal) 75'; Akbarpour (yellow card) 77'; Majidi 87'	IPLStats Report; Goal.com varzesh3.com	Baghlani (yellow card) 50'; Kaebi (yellow card) 64'; Moshkelpour 64' (yellow card) 87'; Dehghani (yellow card) 84'	Stadium: Azadi Stadium; Attendance: 10,000; Referee: Alireza Faghani

4 March 2013 28	Saba Qom	1–1	Esteghlal	Qom
17:25 UTC+03:30	Razaghirad 29'; Lak (yellow card); Nouri (yellow card); Rezaïan (yellow card); Bakhtiarzadeh (red card)	IPLStats Report; FARS	Borhani 90+1' (pen.); Samuel (yellow card)	Stadium: Yadegar Emam Stadium; Attendance: 10,000; Referee: Yadollah Jahanbazi

8 March 2013 29	Esteghlal	1–0	Tractor Sazi	Tehran
17:30 UTC+03:30	Nekounam 31'; Borhani (red card); Akbarpour (yellow card); Omranzadeh (yellow card)	IPLStats Report	Dehnavi (yellow card)	Stadium: Azadi Stadium; Attendance: 65,000; Referee: Saeid Mozaffarizadeh

18 March 2013 30	Naft Tehran	1–1	Esteghlal	Tehran
15:30 UTC+03:30	Norouzi 63'	IPLStats Report	Hatami 15'; Samuel (yellow card)	Stadium: Shahid Dastgerdi Stadium; Attendance: 5,000; Referee: Toraj Haghverdi

12 April 2013 31	Esteghlal	2–0	Gahar Zagros	Tehran
19:00 UTC+03:30	Nekounam 28'; Arze 44'; Beikzadeh (yellow card)	IPLStats Report	Ghasemi (yellow card); Kardoust (yellow card)	Stadium: Azadi Stadium; Attendance: – Referee: Zargar

15 April 2013 32	Esteghlal	1–1	Sepahan	Tehran
19:00 UTC+03:30	Irannejad 90+4' (o.g.); Sadeghi (yellow card); Mousavi (red card)	IPLStats Report	Navidkia 66'; Khalatbari (yellow card); Talebi (red card)	Stadium: Azadi Stadium; Attendance: 70,000; Referee: Saeid Mozaffarizadeh

5 May 2013 33	Foolad	0–1	Esteghlal	Ahvaz
17:45 UTC+03:30		IPLStats Report	Nekounam 19' (pen.)	Stadium: Takhti Ahvaz; Attendance: 20,000; Referee: Mohsen Torki

10 May 2013 34	Esteghlal	1–2	Damash	Tehran
17:45 UTC+03:30	Ashjari 31'	IPLStats Report	Mahdavi 67'; Ebrahimi 80'	Stadium: Azadi Stadium; Attendance: 100,000; Referee: Alireza Khorshidi

=== AFC Champions League ===
==== Group stage ====
===== Group D =====
Pos	Team	Pld	W	D	L	GF	GA	GD	Pts	Qualification
1	(Iran) Esteghlal	6	4	1	1	11	5	+6	13	Advance to knockout stage
2	(Saudi Arabia) Al-Hilal	6	4	0	2	10	6	+4	12	Advance to knockout stage
3	(United Arab Emirates) Al-Ain	6	2	0	4	6	9	−3	6	
4	(Qatar) Al-Rayyan	6	1	1	4	7	14	−7	4	

Source: ScoresPro

Win Draw Loss Postponed

27 February 2013 1	Al-Rayyan (Qatar)	3–3	(Iran) Esteghlal	Al Rayyan
18:20 UTC+3	Tabata 34' (pen.); Haroon 60'; Nilmar 87'	report	Samuel 27'; Borhani 45+1'; Nekounam 85' (pen.); Akbarpour (yellow card)	Stadium: Ahmed bin Ali Stadium; Attendance: 2,000; Referee: Ben Williams

13 March 2013 2	Esteghlal (Iran)	2–0	(United Arab Emirates) Al-Ain	Tehran
19:00 UTC+3:30	Samuel 65'; Majidi 73'; Sadeghi (yellow card)	report		Stadium: Azadi Stadium; Attendance: 21,000; Referee: Valentin Kovalenko

3 April 2013 3	Al-Hilal (Saudi Arabia)	1–2	(Iran) Esteghlal	Riyadh
20:40 UTC+3	Al-Dossari 67'	report	Montazeri 80'; Borhani 85'	Stadium: Prince Faisal bin Fahd Stadium; Attendance: 11,000; Referee: Nawaf Shukralla

9 April 2013 4	Esteghlal (Iran)	0–1	(Saudi Arabia) Al-Hilal	Tehran
21:00 UTC+4:30		report	Al Abed 35'	Stadium: Azadi Stadium; Attendance: 80,300; Referee: Abdul Malik Abdul Bashir

23 April 2013 5	Esteghlal (Iran)	3–0	(Qatar) Al-Rayyan	Tehran
21:00 UTC+4:30	Majidi 45'; Beikzadeh 73'; Borhani 90'	report	Goma (red card) 75'	Stadium: Azadi Stadium; Attendance: 28,330; Referee: Andre El Haddad

30 April 2013 6	Al-Ain (United Arab Emirates)	0–1	(Iran) Esteghlal	Al Ain
19:40 UTC+4		report	Nekounam 80' (pen.)	Stadium: Tahnoun bin Mohammed Stadium; Attendance: 4,173; Referee: Masaaki Toma

==== Knockout stage ====
15 May 2013 First leg	Al Shabab Al Arabi (United Arab Emirates)	2–4	(Iran) Esteghlal	Dubai
20:40 UTC+4	Henrique 45+1'; Edgar 83'	report	Samuel 51'; Nekounam 72'; Majidi 80'; Heydari 89'	Stadium: Maktoum Bin Rashid Al Maktoum Stadium; Attendance: Yuichi Nishimura; Referee: 6,375

22 May 2013 Second leg	Esteghlal (Iran)	0–0	(United Arab Emirates) Al Shabab Al Arabi	Tehran
		report		Stadium: Azadi Stadium

=== Hazfi Cup ===
==== Matches ====
Win Draw Loss Postponed

14 December 2012 1/16	Esteghlal	4–0	Saipa	Tehran
16:15 UTC+03:30	Hatami (yellow card) 34' (goal) 63'; Borhani 46', 65'; Camacho 90+2'	Report; Varzesh3.com	Rezaei (yellow card) 21' (yellow-red card) 42'; Gholamnejad (yellow card) 26'; Márcio (yellow card) 32'; Sadeghi (yellow card) 75'	Stadium: Azadi Stadium; Attendance: 5,000; Referee: Toraj Haghverdi

22 December 2012 1/8	Gahar Dorud	0–1	Esteghlal	Dorud
13:30 UTC+03:30		Report; Varzesh3.com	Mousavi 66'; Heydari (yellow card) 73'	Stadium: Takhti Stadium; Attendance: 3,000; Referee: Yadollah Jahanbazi

9 January 2013 1/4	Esteghlal	5–0	Aboumoslem	Tehran
16:30 UTC+03:30	Samuel 25'; Hatami 46', 65'; Nekounam 63'; Montazeri 76'; Arze (yellow card); Sadeghi (yellow card)	farsnews.com		Stadium: Azadi Stadium; Attendance: 10,000; Referee: Alborz HajiPoor

30 March 2013 1/2	Esteghlal	1–1 (a.e.t.) (4–5 p)	Sepahan	Tehran
17:00 UTC+03:30	Hatami 63'	report	Khalatbari 42'	Stadium: Azadi Stadium; Attendance: 60,000; Referee: Alireza Faghani
	Penalties
	(penalty scored) Jabbari; (penalty scored) Samuel; (penalty scored) Mohammadrezaei; (penalty missed) Sadeghi; (penalty scored) Nekounam; (penalty missed) Rahmati; (penalty missed) Hatami		(penalty scored) Bulku; (penalty scored) Ebrahimi; (penalty scored) Khalatbari; (penalty scored) Hajsafi; (penalty missed) Jamshidian; (penalty missed) Irannejad; (penalty scored) Susak

=== Friendly Matches ===
Win Draw Loss Postponed

4 July 2012	Esteghlal (Iran)	7–0	(Cameroon) Ruero Nif	Istanbul
17:30 UTC+03:00	Borhani; Borhani; Borhani; Borhani; Baou; Omranzadeh; Manouchehri			Stadium: Green Park Camp Stadium

7 July 2012	Paykan (Iran)	2–0	(Iran) Esteghlal	Istanbul
	Alekasir 50'; Gashni 60'

10 July 2012	Elazığspor (Turkey)	2–4	(Iran) Esteghlal	Istanbul
17:30 UTC+03:00			Meidavoudi; Meidavoudi; Borhani; Heydari

28 August 2012	Esteghlal (Iran)	2–2	(Iran) Parseh	Tehran
17:30 UTC+04:30	Tosi 13'; Borhani 65'	Goal report farsnews report Aftabnews report	Ipakchi 10'; Khorsandi 79'	Stadium: Hejazi Camp; Attendance: 300

3 September 2012	Aboumoslem (Iran)	1–2	(Iran) Esteghlal	Mashhad
17:00 UTC+04:30	Rezapour 69'		Tosi 1'; Borhani 63'	Stadium: Samen Stadium; Attendance: 8,000; Referee: Mohsen Ghahremani
Note: Charity match

9 September 2012	Esteghlal (Iran)	1–1	(Iran) Damash Gilan	Tehran
17:30 UTC+04:30	Manouchehri 18'		Chavoshi 70'	Stadium: Hejazi Camp; Attendance: 600

6 October 2012	Esteghlal (Iran)	7–0	(Iran) Honarmandan	Tehran
16:00 UTC+04:30	Manouchehri; Manouchehri; Borhani; Meydavoudi; Sadeghi; Lamali; Sadeghian			Stadium: Ararat Stadium
Note: Charity match

4 February 2013	Esteghlal (Iran)	3–0	(Iran) Paykan	Tehran
15:15 UTC+03:30	Mousavi 6', 42'; Mohammadrezaei 11'	Varzesh3.ir; Shafaf.ir		Stadium: Hejazi Camp; Attendance: 100

== Statistics ==
=== Appearances ===
As of 22 May 2013

No.	Pos	Nat	Player	Total		Iran Pro League		AFC Champions League		Hazfi Cup	
No.	Pos	Nat	Player	Apps	Goals	Apps	Goals	Apps	Goals	Apps	Goals
1	GK	(Iran) IRI	Mehdi Rahmati	46	0	34+0	0	8+0	0	4+0	0
2	DF	(Iran) IRI	Khosro Heydari	41	2	29+1	1	7+0	1	4+0	0
3	DF	(Trinidad and Tobago) TTO	Jlloyd Samuel	35	6	19+6	2	7+0	3	3+0	1
4	DF	(Iran) IRI	Amir Hossein Sadeghi	44	0	31+2	0	6+1	0	4+0	0
5	DF	(Iran) IRI	Hanif Omranzadeh	34	0	17+8	0	6+1	0	1+1	0
6	MF	(Iran) IRI	Javad Nekounam	39	9	26+1	5	8+0	3	4+0	1
7	FW	(Iran) IRI	Farhad Majidi	18	6	4+7	3	3+3	3	0+1	0
8	MF	(Iran) IRI	Mojtaba Jabari	28	0	10+6	0	8+0	0	1+3	0
9	FW	(Iran) IRI	Arash Borhani	38	15	22+5	10	3+4	3	2+2	2
12	DF	(Iran) IRI	Hassan Ashjari	15	1	9+2	1	1+0	0	3+0	0
14	MF	(Iran) IRI	Kianoush Rahmati	2	0	0+1	0	0+1	0	0+0	0
17	MF	(Iran) IRI	Maysam Baou	20	1	10+9	1	0+0	0	1+0	0
18	DF	(Iran) IRI	Hashem Beikzadeh	29	1	20+1	0	6+1	1	1+0	0
19	MF	(Iran) IRI	Abbas Mohammad Rezaei	16	0	10+2	0	0+0	0	3+1	0
20	FW	(Iran) IRI	Siavash Akbarpour	35	3	21+6	3	3+4	0	1+0	0
24	FW	(Iran) IRI	Farzad Hatami	26	10	12+3	6	3+4	0	3+1	4
28	DF	(Iran) IRI	Mehran Ghasemi	1	0	0+0	0	0+0	0	0+1	0
33	DF	(Iran) IRI	Pejman Montazeri	40	3	29+0	1	8+0	1	3+0	1
36	FW	(Iran) IRI	Iman Mousavi	16	2	7+4	1	3+1	0	1+0	1
38	MF	(Bolivia) BOL	Vicente Arze	11	3	6+1	2	2+0	0	0+2	1
40	MF	(Iran) IRI	Ali Hamoudi	42	0	27+4	0	5+2	0	4+0	0
Players sold or loaned out after the start of the season:
10	FW	(Iran) IRI	Milad Meidavoudi	7	1	4+3	1	0+0	0	0+0	0
11	FW	(Iran) IRI	Amin Manouchehri	16	1	6+9	1	0+0	0	1+0	0
16	DF	(Iran) IRI	Meysam Hosseini	10	0	4+6	0	0+0	0	0+0	0
30	MF	(Brazil) BRA	Rodrigo Tosi	9	1	4+5	1	0+0	0	0+0	0
32	MF	(Iran) IRI	Ferydoon Zandi	8	0	5+3	0	0+0	0	0+0	0
37	MF	(Brazil) BRA	Fabio Januario	10	2	8+2	2	0+0	0	0+0	0

=== Top scorers ===
Includes all competitive matches. The list is sorted by shirt number when total goals are equal.

Last updated on 23 March 2013

Ranking	Position	Nation	Name	Pro League	Champions League	Hazfi Cup	Total
1	FW	(Iran)	Arash Borhani	10	3	2	15
2	FW	(Iran)	Farzad Hatami	6	0	4	10
3	MF	(Iran)	Javad Nekounam	5	3	1	9
3	MF	(Trinidad and Tobago)	Jlloyd Samuel	2	3	1	6
3	FW	(Iran)	Farhad Majidi	3	3	0	6
5	FW	(Iran)	Siavash Akbarpour	3	0	0	3
5	DF	(Iran)	Pejman Montazeri	1	1	1	3
5	MF	(Bolivia)	Vicente Arze	2	0	1	3
6	MF	(Brazil)	Januário	2	0	0	2
6	FW	(Iran)	Iman Mousavi	1	0	1	2
6	DF	(Iran)	Khosro Heydari	1	1	0	2
7	DF	(Iran)	Hashem Beikzadeh	0	1	0	1
7	MF	(Iran)	Maysam Baou	1	0	0	1
7	MF	(Brazil)	Rodrigo Tosi	1	0	0	1
Own goal				0	0	0	0
TOTALS				42	15	11	68

Friendlies and Pre season goals are not recognized as competitive match goals.

=== Disciplinary record ===
Includes all competitive matches. Players with 1 card or more included only.

Last updated on 23 March 2013

No.	Nat.	Position	Name	Iran Pro League			AFC Champions League			Hazfi Cup			Total		
No.	Nat.	Position	Name	Yellow card	(yellow card) (yellow-red card)	Red card	Yellow card	(yellow card) (yellow-red card)	Red card	Yellow card	(yellow card) (yellow-red card)	Red card	Yellow card	(yellow card) (yellow-red card)	Red card
5	(Iran)	DF	Hanif Omranzadeh	7	0	0	0	0	0	0	0	0	7	0	0
3	(Trinidad and Tobago)	MF	Jlloyd Samuel	7	1	1	0	0	0	0	0	0	7	1	1
6	(Iran)	MF	Javad Nekounam	3	0	1	0	0	0	1	0	0	4	0	1
20	(Iran)	FW	Siavash Akbarpour	7	0	0	1	0	0	0	0	0	8	0	0
9	(Iran)	FW	Arash Borhani	3	0	1	0	0	0	1	0	0	4	0	1
TOTALS				5	0	0	0	0	0	0	0	0	5	0	0

=== Goals conceded ===
- 4 April 2013

Position	Nation	Number	Name	Pro League	Champions League	Hazfi Cup	Total	Minutes per goal
GK	(Iran)	1	Mehdi Rahmati	18	7	1	26	159.2 min
TOTALS				18	7	1	26	159.2 min

=== Overall statistics ===
	Total	Home	Away	Neutral
Games played	45	26	19	0
Games won	28	16	12	0
Games drawn	11	4	7	0
Games lost	7	4	3	0
Biggest win	5 – 0 Fajr Sepasi; 5 – 0 Aboumoslem	5 – 0 Aboumoslem	5 – 0 Fajr Sepasi	N/A
Biggest loss	0 – 2 Tractor Sazi	2 – 3 Foolad	2 – 0 Tractor Sazi	N/A
Biggest win (League)	5 – 0 Fajr Sepasi	2 – 0 Paykan	5 – 0 Fajr Sepasi	N/A
Biggest win (Cup)	5 – 0 Aboumoslem	5 – 0 Aboumoslem	1 – 0 Gahar Zagros	N/A
Biggest win (Asia)	3 – 0 Al-Rayyan SC	3 – 0 Al-Rayyan SC	N/A	N/A
Biggest loss (League)	0 – 2 Tractor Sazi	2 – 3 Foolad	0 – 2 Tractor Sazi	N/A
Biggest loss (Cup)	N/A	N/A	N/A	N/A
Biggest loss (Asia)	N/A	N/A	N/A	N/A
Clean sheets	28	16	12	0
Goals scored	68	36	32	0
Goals conceded	26	12	14	0
Goal difference	42	24	18	0
Average GF per game	1.5	1.6	1	0
Average GA per game	0.5	0.4	0.4	0
Points	66	36	30	0
Winning rate	62%	66%	57%	N/A
Most appearances	Mehdi Rahmati 45 appearances			
Most minutes played	Mehdi Rahmati 4050 minutes			
Top scorer	Arash Borhani 15 goals			
Top assister	Mojtaba Jabari 11 assists			

Last updated: 24 April 2013
Source: Competitive matches

== Awards ==
=== Team ===
Award	Month	Source
Iran Football Team of the year	June	

=== Player ===
No.	Player	Award	Month	Source
1	(Iran) Mehdi Rahmati	Persian Gulf Pro League Goalkeeper of the year	June	
33	(Iran) Pejman Montazeri	Persian Gulf Pro League Defender of the year	June	
3	(Trinidad and Tobago) Jlloyd Samuel	Persian Gulf Pro League Foreign player of the year	June	

=== Manager ===
Name	Award	Month	Source
(Iran) Amir Ghalenoei	Persian Gulf Pro League Manager of the year	June	

== See also ==
- 2012–13 Persian Gulf Cup
- 2012–13 Hazfi Cup
- 2013 AFC Champions League
