= Mohsen Ghaedpouri =

Iranian footballer

Personal information
- Full name: Mohsen Ghaedpouri
- Date of birth: 21 September 1982 (age 44)
- Place of birth: Iran
- Position: Midfielder

Team information
- Current team: Iranjavan
- Number: 11

Senior career*
Years	Team	Apps	(Gls)
2007–2008	Gol Gohar	?	(2)
2008–2009	Bargh Shiraz	15	(0)
2009–	Iranjavan	21	(3)
- * Club domestic league appearances and goals as of 12 May 2010 (UTC) ‡ National team caps and goals as of 10 May 2010

Mohsen Ghaedpouri (born September 21, 1982) is an Iranian footballer who plays for Iranjavan F.C. in the IPL.

== Club career ==
Ghaedpouri joined Iranjavan F.C. in 2009 after spending the previous season at Bargh Shiraz F.C.

Season	Team	Country	Division	Apps	Goals	Assists
07/08	Gol Gohar	Iran	2	?	2	0
08/09	Bargh Shiraz	Iran	1	15	0	0
09/10	Iranjavan	Iran	2	21	3	0
