= Mojtaba Ensafi =

Iranian football defender

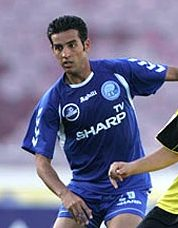
- Mojtaba Ensafi in 2005

Personal information
- Full name: Mojtaba Ensafi
- Date of birth: June 6, 1982 (age 44)
- Place of birth: Iran
- Position: Defender

Senior career*
Years	Team	Apps	(Gls)
2003–2006	Esteghlal		
2005–2006	→ Shahid Ghandi (loan)	25	(0)
2006–2007	Bargh Shiraz	16	(0)
2007–2008	Shirin Faraz	15	(1)
2008–2010	Mes Kerman	16	(2)
2010–2012	Aboomoslem	32	(0)
2012	Malavan	8	(0)
2012–2014	Yazd Louleh	11	(1)
- * Club domestic league appearances and goals as of 17 December 2011 ‡ National team caps and goals as of 30 December 2009

Mojtaba Ensafi (Persian: مجتبی انصافی, June 6, 1982) is an Iranian football defender.
