= Hojjat Chaharmahali =

Iranian football player

Personal information
- Date of birth: March 25, 1989 (age 37)
- Place of birth: Shoushtar, Khuzestan, Iran
- Height: 1.70 m (5 ft 7 in)
- Position: Midfielder

Youth career
- Keshto Sanat Shoushtar
- 2004–2005: Foolad

Senior career*
Years	Team	Apps	(Gls)
2005–2009	Foolad	41	(4)
2009–2012	Sanat Naft	20	(2)
2012–2013	Esteghlal	0	(0)
2013–2014	Shahrdari Yasuj	8	(3)
2014–2015	Esteghlal Khuzestan	7	(0)
2016–2023	Foolad B	38	(10)
2018	→ Shahrdari Fouman (loan)		

International career
2006–2007	Iran U20	2	(4)
- * Club domestic league appearances and goals

Hojat Chaharmahali (Persian: حجت چهارمحالی, born 25 March 1989) is an Iranian former football player.

== Club career ==
Chaharmahali started his career at Foolad in 2005. Chaharmahali played for Foolad in the 2006 AFC Champions League group stage.

On 14 November 2006, Radio Farda reported that Olympiacos were to sign Chaharmahali on a 5-year deal, although the deal did not go through.

=== Club career statistics ===
As of 13 June 2012

Club performance			League		Cup		Continental		Total	
Season	Club	League	Apps	Goals	Apps	Goals	Apps	Goals	Apps	Goals
Iran			League		Hazfi Cup		Asia		Total	
2005–06	Foolad	Persian Gulf Cup	17	3	2	1	0	0	19	4
2006–07	Foolad	Persian Gulf Cup	22	2	2	1	-	-	24	3
2007–08	Foolad	Persian Gulf Cup	11	2	1	1	-	-	12	3
2008–09	Foolad	Persian Gulf Cup	2	0	0	0	-	-	2	0
2009–10	Sanat Naft	Azadegan League	4	2	0	0	-	-	4	2
2010–11	Sanat Naft	Persian Gulf Cup	12	0	0	0	-	-	12	0
2011–12	Sanat Naft	Persian Gulf Cup	4	0	0	0	-	-	4	0
2012–13	Sanat Naft	Persian Gulf Cup	4	0	0	0	0	0	4	0
2012–13	Esteghlal	Persian Gulf Cup	0	0	0	0	0	0	0	0
Total	Iran		76	6	0	0	0	0	81	12
Career total			76	6	0	0	0	0	81	12

== International career ==
He plays for Iran national under-20 football team and Iran national under-23 football team.

== Honours ==
Esteghlal

- Iran Pro League (1): 2012–13
