= Mohammad Sadegh Barani =

Iranian football player

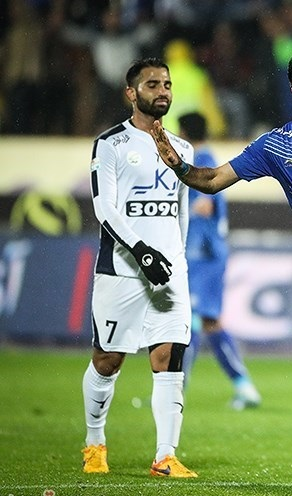

Personal information
- Full name: Mohammad Sadegh Barani
- Date of birth: December 9, 1991 (age 34)
- Place of birth: Tehran, Iran
- Position: Midfielder

Team information
- Current team: Saipa
- Number: 77

Youth career
- Esteghlal

Senior career*
Years	Team	Apps	(Gls)
2010–2012	Rah Ahan	2	(0)
2012–2013	Zob Ahan	4	(0)
2013–2018	Paykan	128	(10)
2018	Nassaji	1	(0)
2018–2019	Saipa	10	(2)
2019	Shahin Bushehr	7	(0)
2020–2021	Saipa	33	(1)
2021–	Malavan F.C.	18	(6)
- * Club domestic league appearances and goals as of 14 February 2017

Mohammad Sadegh Barani (Persian: محمدصادق بارانی, December 9, 1991) is an Iranian football midfielder who plays for Saipa in the Persian Gulf Pro League.

== Club career ==
He joined Rah Ahan in 2010–11 season and just played 3 times as a substitute. In June 2012 he joined Isfahani side, Zob Ahan, with a three-years contract which keeping him in the club until end of 2014–15 season.

=== Paykan ===
Barani joined Paykan in the summer of 2013 and he was named club captain in 2015. He helped Paykan promote back to the Persian Gulf Pro League in 2016.

=== Club Career Statistics ===
- Last Update: 27 May 2018

Club performance			League		Cup		Continental		Total	
Season	Club	League	Apps	Goals	Apps	Goals	Apps	Goals	Apps	Goals
Iran			League		Hazfi Cup		Asia		Total	
2010–11	Rah Ahan	Pro League	0	0	0	0	–	–	0	0
2011–12	Rah Ahan	Pro League	2	0	0	0	–	–	2	0
2012–13	Zob Ahan	Persian Gulf Pro League	4	0	0	0	–	–	4	0
2013–14	Paykan	Division 1	25	1	1	0	–	–	26	1
2014–15	Paykan	Persian Gulf Pro League	17	0	0	0	–	–	17	0
2015-16	Paykan	Persian Gulf Pro League	35	3	1	0	–	–	36	3
2016-17	Paykan	Persian Gulf Pro League	26	2	1	1	–	–	27	3
2017-18	Paykan	Persian Gulf Pro League	25	4	1	0	–	–	26	4
Total			128	10	4	1	0	0	132	11
2018-19	Nassaji	Persian Gulf Pro League	1	0	0	0	0	0	1	0
2018-19	Saipa	Persian Gulf Pro League	11	1	2	1	0	0	13	2
2019-20	Shahin	Persian Gulf Pro League	15	0	2	0	0	0	17	0
2019-20	Saipa	Persian Gulf Pro League	13	0	0	0	0	0	13	0
2020-21	Saipa	Persian Gulf Pro League	30	1	0	0	0	0	30	1
Total			43	1	0	0	0	0	43	1
2021-22	Malavan	Azadegan League	28	6	1	0	0	0	29	6
2022-23	Malavan	Persian Gulf Pro League	27	0	2	0	0	0	29	0
Total			55	6	3	0	0	0	58	6
2023-24	Mes	Azadegan League	7	0	0	0	0	0	7	0
2023-24	Sanat	Persian Gulf Pro League	5	0	0	0	0	0	5	0
Career total			271	18	11	2	–	–	282	20

- Assist Goals

Season	Team	Assists
2011–12	Rah Ahan	0
