= Hadi Bolouri =

Iranian footballer (born 1986)

Personal information
- Full name: Hadi Bolouri Novin
- Date of birth: 21 September 1986 (age 40)
- Place of birth: Iran
- Position: Midfielder

Team information
- Current team: Pas Hamedan
- Number: 12

Youth career
- Pas Hamedan

Senior career*
Years	Team	Apps	(Gls)
2009–2011	Pas Hamedan	15	(1)
2012–	Alvand Hamedan		
- * Club domestic league appearances and goals as of 11 August 2010

Hadi Bolouri (born 21 September 1986) is an Iranian footballer. He currently plays for Alvand Hamedan in the Azadegan League.

== Club career ==
Bolouri has been with Pas Hamedan F.C. since 2009.

Club performance			League		Cup		Continental		Total	
Season	Club	League	Apps	Goals	Apps	Goals	Apps	Goals	Apps	Goals
Iran			League		Hazfi Cup		Asia		Total	
2009–10	Pas	Persian Gulf Cup	15	1			-	-		
2010–11	Pas	Persian Gulf Cup	0	0	0	0	-	-	0	0
Total	Iran		15	1			0	0		
Career total			15	1			0	0		

- Assist Goals

Season	Team	Assists
10–11	Pas	0
