= Mehran Ghasemi =

Iranian football midfielder (born 1991)

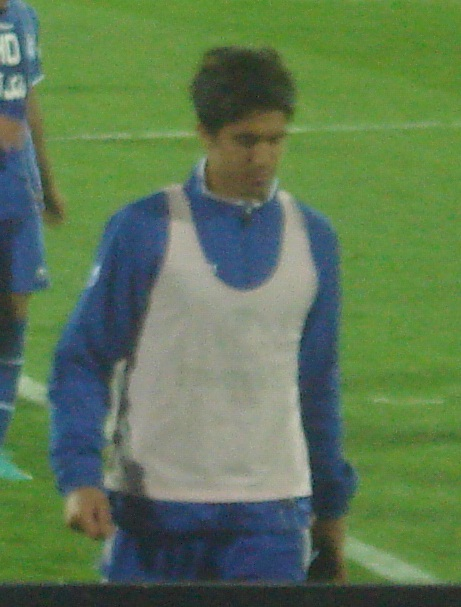

Personal information
- Full name: Mehran Ghasemi
- Date of birth: November 11, 1991 (age 35)
- Place of birth: Tehran, Iran
- Height: 1.80 m (5 ft 11 in)
- Position: Midfielder

Team information
- Current team: Rah Ahan Crystal F.C.
- Number: 16

Youth career
- 2008–2010: Steel Azin

Senior career*
Years	Team	Apps	(Gls)
2010–2012	Steel Azin	10	(0)
2012–2014	Esteghlal	2	(0)
2013–2014	Esteghlal II	9	(4)
2014	Zob Ahan	2	(0)
2014–2015	Giti Pasand	0	(0)
2015–	Rah Ahan FC		
- * Club domestic league appearances and goals as of 5 September 2013 ‡ National team caps and goals as of 30 June 2012

Mehran Ghasemi (Persian: مهران قاسمی, born November 11, 1991, in Tehran, Iran) is an Iranian football midfielder, who currently plays for Rah Ahan FC in Persian Gulf Pro League.

== Club career statistics ==
Last updated 10 October 2014

Club performance			League		Cup		Continental		Total	
Season	Club	League	Apps	Goals	Apps	Goals	Apps	Goals	Apps	Goals
Iran			League		Hazfi Cup		Asia		Total	
2012–13	Esteghlal	Pro League	0	0	1	0	0	0	1	0
2013–14	Esteghlal	Pro League	2	0	0	0	0	0	2	0
2013–14	Zob Ahan	Pro League	0	0	0	0	-	-	0	0
2014–15	Giti Pasand	Azadegan League	0	0	1	1	-	-	0	0
Total	Iran		1	0	2	1	0	0	2	0
Career total			1	0	2	1	0	0	2	0

== Honours ==
Esteghlal

- Iran Pro League (1): 2012–13

Zob Ahan

- Iran Pro League (1): 2013–14

Giti Pasand

- Azadegan League (1): 2014–15

Rah Ahan FC

- Iran Pro League (1): 2015–16
