= Amin Manouchehri =

Iranian footballer (born 1986)

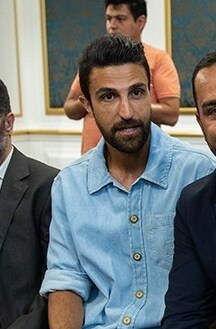

Personal information
- Full name: Seyyed Amin Manouchehri masooleh
- Date of birth: 6 February 1986 (age 40)
- Place of birth: Tehran, Iran
- Height: 1.97 m (6 ft 5 1/2 in)
- Position: Forward

Team information
- Current team: Saipa

Youth career
- 2003–2006: Shahab Zanjan
- 2006–2007: Saipa

College career
Years	Team	Apps	(Gls)
–2006	Islamic Azad University		

Senior career*
Years	Team	Apps	(Gls)
2006–2012	Saipa	107	(38)
2012–2013	Esteghlal	17	(4)
2013	→ Naft Tehran (loan)	16	(6)
2013–2016	Rah Ahan	64	(17)
2016	Sepahan	11	(3)
2016–2017	Baadraan Tehran	11	(2)
2017	Nassaji	11	(3)
2017–2018	Naft Tehran	24	(4)
2018	Sepidrood	12	(0)
2019	Saipa	0	(0)

Managerial career
- 2022–: Esteghlal(U14)
- * Club domestic league appearances and goals as of 25 January 2018

Amin Manouchehri (born February 6, 1986) is an Iranian footballer who last played for Saipa in the Persian Gulf Pro League.

== Club career ==
Manouchehri started his professional playing career with Saipa. After several good seasons at Saipa he caught the eye of Tehran Giants, Esteghlal. On June 6, 2012, he joined the Persian Gulf Pro League giants Esteghlal on a two-year contract, but he was released at the winter transfer window. He then joined Naft Tehran and played until the end of the season for the club. He joined to Rah Ahan for the 2013–14 season on loan from Naft Tehran. Before the start of 2015–15 season, Manouchehri has accepted the permanent move to Rah Ahan by signing a three-year contract with the club.

=== Sepahan ===
Manouchehri joined Sepahan midway through the 2015–16 season. On 28 April 2016 Manouchehri scored in a 2–1 victory over Gostaresh Foolad.

=== Club career statistics ===
As of 19 August 2014

Club performance			League		Cup		Continental		Total	
Season	Club	League	Apps	Goals	Apps	Goals	Apps	Goals	Apps	Goals
Iran			League		Hazfi Cup		Asia		Total	
2006–07	Saipa	Pro League	3	0	1	0	–		4	0
2007–08	Saipa	Pro League	6	0	1	0	0	0	7	0
2008–09	Saipa	Pro League	18	4	0	0	–		18	4
2009–10	Saipa	Pro League	29	12	1	0	–		30	12
2010–11	Saipa	Pro League	27	3	1	0	–		28	3
2011–12	Saipa	Pro League	21	5	1	0	–		22	5
2012–13	Esteghlal	Pro League	8	1	0	0	0	0	8	1
2012–13	Naft Tehran	Pro League	16	5	1	1	–		17	6
2013–14	Rah Ahan	Pro League	27	3	3	0	–		30	3
2014–15	Rah Ahan	Pro League	29	4	0	0	–		29	4
2015–16	Rah Ahan	Pro League	12	2	0	0	–		12	2

- Assist Goals

Season	Team	Assists
09–10	Saipa	5
10–11	Saipa	1
11–12	Saipa	0
12–13	Naft Tehran	2
13–14	Rah Ahan	1
14–15	Rah Ahan	0
15–16	Rah Ahan	3
15–16	Sepahan	0

== Honours ==
Saipa

- Iran Pro League (1): 2006–07
